= 2005 24 Hours of Daytona =

Previous: 2004	Next: 2006
Index: Races | Winners

Track map of Daytona International Speedway

The 2005 Rolex 24 at Daytona was a Grand-Am Rolex Sports Car Series 24-hour endurance sports car race held on February 5–6, 2005 at the Daytona International Speedway road course. The race served as the first round of the 2005 Rolex Sports Car Series. For the first time, all cars used a standard tire; as the series mandated, all cars use Hoosier tires. The overall winner of the race was the No. 10 SunTrust Racing Riley Mk XI driven by Max Angelelli, Wayne Taylor, and Emmanuel Collard. The GT class was won by the No. 71 Farnbacher Racing USA Porsche 996 GT3 Cup driven by Wolf Henzler, Dominik Farnbacher, Perre Ehret, and Shawn Price.

== Race results ==
Class winners in bold.

Pos	Class	No	Team	Drivers	Chassis	Laps
Pos	Class	No	Team	Drivers	Engine	Laps
1	**DP**	**10**	**(United States) SunTrust Racing**	**(Italy) Max Angelelli (South Africa) Wayne Taylor (France) Emmanuel Collard**	**Riley Mk XI**	**710**
1	**DP**	**10**	**(United States) SunTrust Racing**	**(Italy) Max Angelelli (South Africa) Wayne Taylor (France) Emmanuel Collard**	**Pontiac 5.0 L V8**	**710**
2	DP	4	(United States) Howard-Boss Motorsports	(United States) Butch Leitzinger (United States) Elliott Forbes-Robinson (United States) Jimmie Johnson	Crawford DP03	699
2	DP	4	(United States) Howard-Boss Motorsports	(United States) Butch Leitzinger (United States) Elliott Forbes-Robinson (United States) Jimmie Johnson	Pontiac 5.0 L V8	699
3	DP	20	(United States) Howard-Boss Motorsports	(United Kingdom) Andy Wallace (Netherlands) Jan Lammers (United States) Tony Stewart	Crawford DP03	699
3	DP	20	(United States) Howard-Boss Motorsports	(United Kingdom) Andy Wallace (Netherlands) Jan Lammers (United States) Tony Stewart	Pontiac 5.0 L V8	699
4	DP	02	(United States) New Century Mortgage Chip Ganassi Racing with Felix Sabates	(Sweden) Stefan Johansson (United States) Cort Wagner (United States) Jamie McMurray	Riley Mk XI	698
4	DP	02	(United States) New Century Mortgage Chip Ganassi Racing with Felix Sabates	(Sweden) Stefan Johansson (United States) Cort Wagner (United States) Jamie McMurray	Lexus 4.3 L V8	698
5	DP	77	(United States) Doran Racing	(Italy) Fabrizio Gollin (Italy) Matteo Bobbi (Belgium) Didier Theys	Doran JE4	697
5	DP	77	(United States) Doran Racing	(Italy) Fabrizio Gollin (Italy) Matteo Bobbi (Belgium) Didier Theys	Lexus 4.3 L V8	697
6	DP	03	(United States) Target Chip Ganassi Racing with Felix Sabates	(New Zealand) Scott Dixon (United States) Casey Mears (United Kingdom) Darren Manning	Riley Mk XI	694
6	DP	03	(United States) Target Chip Ganassi Racing with Felix Sabates	(New Zealand) Scott Dixon (United States) Casey Mears (United Kingdom) Darren Manning	Lexus 4.3 L V8	694
7	DP	01	(United States) CompUSA Chip Ganassi Racing with Felix Sabates	(United States) Scott Pruett (Mexico) Luis Díaz (Australia) Ryan Briscoe	Riley Mk XI	688
7	DP	01	(United States) CompUSA Chip Ganassi Racing with Felix Sabates	(United States) Scott Pruett (Mexico) Luis Díaz (Australia) Ryan Briscoe	Lexus 4.3 L V8	688
8	DP	58	(United States) Brumos Racing	(United States) David Donohue (United States) Darren Law (Germany) Lucas Luhr (Germany) Sascha Maassen	Fabcar FDSC/03	680
8	DP	58	(United States) Brumos Racing	(United States) David Donohue (United States) Darren Law (Germany) Lucas Luhr (Germany) Sascha Maassen	Porsche 3.6 L Flat-6	680
9 DNF	DP	44	(United States) Doran Racing	(Denmark) Jan Magnussen (United States) Terry Labonte (United States) Bobby Labonte (United States) Bryan Herta	Doran JE4	675
9 DNF	DP	44	(United States) Doran Racing	(Denmark) Jan Magnussen (United States) Terry Labonte (United States) Bobby Labonte (United States) Bryan Herta	Pontiac 5.0 L V8	675
10	**GT**	**71**	**(United States) Farnbacher Racing USA**	**(Germany) Wolf Henzler (Germany) Dominik Farnbacher (Germany) Pierre Ehret (United States) Shawn Price**	**Porsche 996 GT3 Cup**	**664**
10	**GT**	**71**	**(United States) Farnbacher Racing USA**	**(Germany) Wolf Henzler (Germany) Dominik Farnbacher (Germany) Pierre Ehret (United States) Shawn Price**	**Porsche 3.6 L Flat-6**	**664**
11	GT	37	(United States) TPC Racing	(United States) Mike Fitzgerald (Puerto Rico) Manuel Matos (United States) Emil Assentato (United States) Nick Longhi	Porsche 996 GT3 Cup	661
11	GT	37	(United States) TPC Racing	(United States) Mike Fitzgerald (Puerto Rico) Manuel Matos (United States) Emil Assentato (United States) Nick Longhi	Porsche 3.6 L Flat-6	661
12	GT	61	(United States) The Racer's Group	(United Kingdom) Robert Nearn (Canada) Mark Wilkins (Canada) Dave Lacey (Canada) David Shep (Canada) Greg Wilkins	Porsche 996 GT3 Cup	659
12	GT	61	(United States) The Racer's Group	(United Kingdom) Robert Nearn (Canada) Mark Wilkins (Canada) Dave Lacey (Canada) David Shep (Canada) Greg Wilkins	Porsche 3.6 L Flat-6	659
13	GT	73	(United States) Baldwin-Tafel Racing	(United Kingdom) Robin Liddell (United States) Jack Baldwin (United States) Craig Stanton (United States) Jim Tafel (United States) Andrew Davis	Porsche 996 GT3 Cup	659
13	GT	73	(United States) Baldwin-Tafel Racing	(United Kingdom) Robin Liddell (United States) Jack Baldwin (United States) Craig Stanton (United States) Jim Tafel (United States) Andrew Davis	Porsche 3.6 L Flat-6	659
14	GT	65	(United States) The Racer's Group	(United States) Andy Lally (United States) Marc Bunting (United States) Hugh Plumb (United States) Carlos de Quesada (United States) Kevin Buckler	Porsche 996 GT3 Cup	656
14	GT	65	(United States) The Racer's Group	(United States) Andy Lally (United States) Marc Bunting (United States) Hugh Plumb (United States) Carlos de Quesada (United States) Kevin Buckler	Porsche 3.6 L Flat-6	656
15	GT	14	(United States) Autometrics Motorsports	(United States) Leh Keen (United States) Cory Friedman (United States) Al Bacon (United States) Steve Johnson	Porsche 996 GT3 Cup	654
15	GT	14	(United States) Autometrics Motorsports	(United States) Leh Keen (United States) Cory Friedman (United States) Al Bacon (United States) Steve Johnson	Porsche 3.6 L Flat-6	654
16	DP	66	(United States) Krohn Racing/The Racer's Group	(Italy) Max Papis (Germany) Jörg Bergmeister (United Kingdom) Oliver Gavin	Riley Mk XI	653
16	DP	66	(United States) Krohn Racing/The Racer's Group	(Italy) Max Papis (Germany) Jörg Bergmeister (United Kingdom) Oliver Gavin	Pontiac 5.0 L V8	653
17	GT	16	(United States) The Racer's Group	(Canada) Ross Bentley (United States) Colin Braun (United States) Adrian Carrio (United States) Brad Coleman (United States) Kevin Buckler	Porsche 996 GT3 Cup	650
17	GT	16	(United States) The Racer's Group	(Canada) Ross Bentley (United States) Colin Braun (United States) Adrian Carrio (United States) Brad Coleman (United States) Kevin Buckler	Porsche 3.6 L Flat-6	650
18 DNF	DP	67	(United States) Krohn Racing/The Racer's Group	(Sweden) Niclas Jönsson (United States) Tracy Krohn (United States) Buddy Rice (United States) Boris Said (Mexico) Jimmy Morales	Riley Mk XI	642
18 DNF	DP	67	(United States) Krohn Racing/The Racer's Group	(Sweden) Niclas Jönsson (United States) Tracy Krohn (United States) Buddy Rice (United States) Boris Said (Mexico) Jimmy Morales	Pontiac 5.0 L V8	642
19	DP	74	(United States) Robinson Racing	(United States) Wally Dallenbach Jr. (United States) Paul Dallenbach (United States) George Robinson (United States) Johnny Unser	Riley Mk XI	641
19	DP	74	(United States) Robinson Racing	(United States) Wally Dallenbach Jr. (United States) Paul Dallenbach (United States) George Robinson (United States) Johnny Unser	Lexus 4.3 L V8	641
20	GT	63	(United States) The Racer's Group	(United States) Dave Master (United States) Patrick Flanagan (Belgium) Marc Sluszny (United States) Derek Clark	Porsche 996 GT3 Cup	639
20	GT	63	(United States) The Racer's Group	(United States) Dave Master (United States) Patrick Flanagan (Belgium) Marc Sluszny (United States) Derek Clark	Porsche 3.6 L Flat-6	639
21	GT	43	(United States) Team Sahlen	(United States) Ronald Zitza (United States) Bradley Blum (United States) Eric Lux (United States) Wes Allen (Puerto Rico) Victor Gonzalez Jr.	Porsche 996 GT3 Cup	637
21	GT	43	(United States) Team Sahlen	(United States) Ronald Zitza (United States) Bradley Blum (United States) Eric Lux (United States) Wes Allen (Puerto Rico) Victor Gonzalez Jr.	Porsche3.6 L Flat-6	637
22	DP	5	(United States) Essex Racing	(United States) Chris Dyson (United States) Harrison Brix (United States) Rob Dyson (United States) James Gue	Crawford DP03	630
22	DP	5	(United States) Essex Racing	(United States) Chris Dyson (United States) Harrison Brix (United States) Rob Dyson (United States) James Gue	Ford 5.0 L V8	630
23	DP	3	(United States) Cegwa Sport/Southard Motorsports	(Poland) Darius Grala (United States) Mark Patterson (United States) Quentin Wahl (United States) Bohdan Kroczek (United States) Shane Lewis	Fabcar FDSC/03	630
23	DP	3	(United States) Cegwa Sport/Southard Motorsports	(Poland) Darius Grala (United States) Mark Patterson (United States) Quentin Wahl (United States) Bohdan Kroczek (United States) Shane Lewis	Lexus 4.3 L V8	630
24	GT	52	(Italy) Mastercar	(Italy) Luca Drudi (Italy) Gabrio Rosa (Spain) Luis Monzón (Spain) María de Villota	Ferrari 360 Modena Challenge	627
24	GT	52	(Italy) Mastercar	(Italy) Luca Drudi (Italy) Gabrio Rosa (Spain) Luis Monzón (Spain) María de Villota	Ferrari 3.6 L V8	627
25	GT	11	(United States) JMB Racing	(United States) Matt Plumb (United Kingdom) David Gooding (United States) Peter Boss (United States) Jim Michaelian	Ferrari 360 Modena Challenge	623
25	GT	11	(United States) JMB Racing	(United States) Matt Plumb (United Kingdom) David Gooding (United States) Peter Boss (United States) Jim Michaelian	Ferrari 3.6 L V8	623
26	GT	04	(United States) Sigalsport	(United States) Gene Sigal (Slovakia) Miro Konôpka (United States) Troy Hanson (Greece) Nikolas Konstant (United States) Jay Wilton	Porsche 996 GT3 Cup	599
26	GT	04	(United States) Sigalsport	(United States) Gene Sigal (Slovakia) Miro Konôpka (United States) Troy Hanson (Greece) Nikolas Konstant (United States) Jay Wilton	Porsche 3.6 L Flat-6	599
27 DNF	DP	49	(United States) Multimatic Motorsports	(Canada) Scott Maxwell (United States) Kurt Busch (United States) Matt Kenseth (United States) Greg Biffle	Multimatic MDP1	588
27 DNF	DP	49	(United States) Multimatic Motorsports	(Canada) Scott Maxwell (United States) Kurt Busch (United States) Matt Kenseth (United States) Greg Biffle	Ford 5.0 L V8	588
28	GT	75	(United States) Flying Lizard Motorsports	(United States) Lonnie Pechnik (United States) Seth Neiman (United States) Johannes van Overbeek (United States) Patrick Long (United States) Jon Fogarty	Porsche 996 GT3 Cup	582
28	GT	75	(United States) Flying Lizard Motorsports	(United States) Lonnie Pechnik (United States) Seth Neiman (United States) Johannes van Overbeek (United States) Patrick Long (United States) Jon Fogarty	Porsche 3.6 L Flat-6	582
29	GT	80	(United States) Team Seattle/Synergy Racing	(United States) Don Kitch Jr. (United States) Don Gagne (United States) Don Pickering (United States) Chris Pallis	Porsche 996 GT3 Cup	582
29	GT	80	(United States) Team Seattle/Synergy Racing	(United States) Don Kitch Jr. (United States) Don Gagne (United States) Don Pickering (United States) Chris Pallis	Porsche 3.6 L Flat-6	582
30	GT	78	(United States) Farnbacher Racing USA	(United States) Paul Bonham (United States) Bruce Phillips (United States) Paul Orwicz (United States) Ray Williams (United States) Paul Fairchild	Porsche 996 GT3 Cup	581
30	GT	78	(United States) Farnbacher Racing USA	(United States) Paul Bonham (United States) Bruce Phillips (United States) Paul Orwicz (United States) Ray Williams (United States) Paul Fairchild	Porsche 3.6 L Flat-6	581
31	GT	53	(Italy) Mastercar	(Italy) Roberto Ragazzi (Spain) Jesús Diez de Villarroel (Italy) Giuseppe Chiminelli (Italy) Constantino Bertuzzi	Ferrari 360 Modena Challenge	553
31	GT	53	(Italy) Mastercar	(Italy) Roberto Ragazzi (Spain) Jesús Diez de Villarroel (Italy) Giuseppe Chiminelli (Italy) Constantino Bertuzzi	Ferrari 3.6 L V8	553
32	GT	41	(United States) Team Sahlen	(United States) Wayne Nonnamaker (United States) Joe Nonnamaker (United States) Will Nonnamaker (United Kingdom) James Jakes	Porsche 996 GT3 Cup	544
32	GT	41	(United States) Team Sahlen	(United States) Wayne Nonnamaker (United States) Joe Nonnamaker (United States) Will Nonnamaker (United Kingdom) James Jakes	Porsche 3.6 L Flat-6	544
33 DNF	DP	2	(United States) Howard-Boss Motorsports	(United Kingdom) Dario Franchitti (Venezuela) Milka Duno (United Kingdom) Marino Franchitti (United Kingdom) Dan Wheldon	Crawford DP03	528
33 DNF	DP	2	(United States) Howard-Boss Motorsports	(United Kingdom) Dario Franchitti (Venezuela) Milka Duno (United Kingdom) Marino Franchitti (United Kingdom) Dan Wheldon	Pontiac 5.0 L V8	528
34 DNF	DP	8	(United States) Synergy Racing	(United States) Brian Frisselle (Brazil) Thomas Erdos (United States) Burt Frisselle (United Kingdom) Mike Newton	Doran JE4	523
34 DNF	DP	8	(United States) Synergy Racing	(United States) Brian Frisselle (Brazil) Thomas Erdos (United States) Burt Frisselle (United Kingdom) Mike Newton	BMW 4.3 L V8	523
35	GT	55	(United States) ASC Motorsports	(United States) Zach Arnold (United States) Kurt Thiel (United States) John Stevenson (Canada) Ken MacAlpine (United States) Scott Turner	Chevrolet Corvette	507
35	GT	55	(United States) ASC Motorsports	(United States) Zach Arnold (United States) Kurt Thiel (United States) John Stevenson (Canada) Ken MacAlpine (United States) Scott Turner	Chevrolet 5.7 L V8	507
36 DNF	GT	36	(United States) TPC Racing	(United States) Randy Pobst (United States) Spencer Pumpelly (Canada) Jean-François Dumoulin (United States) Michael Levitas (United States) John Littlechild	Porsche 996 GT3 Cup	495
36 DNF	GT	36	(United States) TPC Racing	(United States) Randy Pobst (United States) Spencer Pumpelly (Canada) Jean-François Dumoulin (United States) Michael Levitas (United States) John Littlechild	Porsche 3.6 L Flat-6	495
37	DP	9	(United States) Hyper Sport	(United States) B. J. Zacharias (United States) David Donner (United States) Joe Foster (United States) Rick Skelton (United States) Blake Rosser	Doran JE4	493
37	DP	9	(United States) Hyper Sport	(United States) B. J. Zacharias (United States) David Donner (United States) Joe Foster (United States) Rick Skelton (United States) Blake Rosser	Infiniti 4.3 L V8	493
38 DNF	GT	06	(United States) Bernheim Porsche Racing	(United States) Dwain Derment (United States) Jack Lewis (United States) Anders Hainer (United States) Kevin Roush (United States) Steven Bernheim	Porsche 996 GT3 Cup	488
38 DNF	GT	06	(United States) Bernheim Porsche Racing	(United States) Dwain Derment (United States) Jack Lewis (United States) Anders Hainer (United States) Kevin Roush (United States) Steven Bernheim	Porsche 3.6 L Flat-6	488
39	GT	81	(United States) Team Seattle/Synergy Racing	(United States) Dave Gaylord (United States) Mae Van Wijk (United States) David Murry (United States) Rod Emory	Porsche 996 GT3 Cup	477
39	GT	81	(United States) Team Seattle/Synergy Racing	(United States) Dave Gaylord (United States) Mae Van Wijk (United States) David Murry (United States) Rod Emory	Porsche 3.6 L Flat-6	477
40	GT	23	(United States) Horizon Motorsports LLC	(United States) Charles Espenlaub (United States) Kris Szekeres (United States) Todd Hanson (United States) Al Villamil (United States) Frank Del Vecchio	Pontiac GTO	476
40	GT	23	(United States) Horizon Motorsports LLC	(United States) Charles Espenlaub (United States) Kris Szekeres (United States) Todd Hanson (United States) Al Villamil (United States) Frank Del Vecchio	Pontiac 5.7 L V8	476
41	GT	62	(United States) The Racer's Group	(Japan) Takashi Inoue (Japan) Akria Fujita (Japan) Hiroshi Wada (Japan) Akira Hirakawa (Japan) Kiichi Takahashi	Porsche 996 GT3 Cup	468
41	GT	62	(United States) The Racer's Group	(Japan) Takashi Inoue (Japan) Akria Fujita (Japan) Hiroshi Wada (Japan) Akira Hirakawa (Japan) Kiichi Takahashi	Porsche 3.6 L Flat-6	468
42	DP	19	(United States) Ten Motorsports	(United States) Memo Gidley (United States) Michael McDowell (Canada) Michael Valiante (United States) Jonathan Bomarito	Riley Mk XI	465
42	DP	19	(United States) Ten Motorsports	(United States) Memo Gidley (United States) Michael McDowell (Canada) Michael Valiante (United States) Jonathan Bomarito	BMW 5.0 L V8	465
43 DNF	DP	29	(United States) Brumos Racing	(United States) Josh Vargo (United States) Jake Vargo (United States) Tim Vargo (United States) Brady Refenning	Fabcar FDSC/03	463
43 DNF	DP	29	(United States) Brumos Racing	(United States) Josh Vargo (United States) Jake Vargo (United States) Tim Vargo (United States) Brady Refenning	Porsche 3.6 L Flat-6	463
44 DNF	DP	59	(United States) Brumos Racing	(United States) J. C. France (United States) Hurley Haywood (Germany) Timo Bernhard (Germany) Mike Rockenfeller; Romain Dumas	Fabcar FDSC/03	432
44 DNF	DP	59	(United States) Brumos Racing	(United States) J. C. France (United States) Hurley Haywood (Germany) Timo Bernhard (Germany) Mike Rockenfeller; Romain Dumas	Porsche 3.6 L Flat-6	432
45 DNF	GT	51	(Italy) Red Bull Ebimotors	(Austria) Karl Wendlinger (Austria) Dieter Quester (United Kingdom) Johnny Mowlem (Belgium) Vincent Vosse	Porsche 996 GT3 Cup	409
45 DNF	GT	51	(Italy) Red Bull Ebimotors	(Austria) Karl Wendlinger (Austria) Dieter Quester (United Kingdom) Johnny Mowlem (Belgium) Vincent Vosse	Porsche 3.6 L Flat-6	409
46 DNF	DP	6	(United States) Michael Shank Racing	(United States) Mike Borkowski (United States) Paul Mears Jr. (United States) Larry Connor (United States) Duncan Dayton	Riley Mk XI	399
46 DNF	DP	6	(United States) Michael Shank Racing	(United States) Mike Borkowski (United States) Paul Mears Jr. (United States) Larry Connor (United States) Duncan Dayton	Pontiac 5.0 L V8	399
47	GT	85	(United States) Condor Motorsports	(United States) Grant Phipps (United States) Mike Hardage (United States) Eddie Nahir (United States) Don Mayer (Italy) Armando Trentini	Porsche 996 GT3 Cup	355
47	GT	85	(United States) Condor Motorsports	(United States) Grant Phipps (United States) Mike Hardage (United States) Eddie Nahir (United States) Don Mayer (Italy) Armando Trentini	Porsche 3.6 L Flat-6	355
48	GT	08	(United States) Goldin Brothers Racing	(United States) Keith Goldin (United States) Scott Finlay (United States) Steve Goldin (United States) Martin Shuster	Mazda RX-8	336
48	GT	08	(United States) Goldin Brothers Racing	(United States) Keith Goldin (United States) Scott Finlay (United States) Steve Goldin (United States) Martin Shuster	Mazda 1.3 L 3-Rotar RENESIS	336
49 DNF	DP	54	(United States) Kodak-Bell Motorsports	(Brazil) Christian Fittipaldi (Canada) Paul Tracy (United States) Terry Borcheller (Germany) Ralf Kelleners (United States) Forest Barber	Doran JE4	328
49 DNF	DP	54	(United States) Kodak-Bell Motorsports	(Brazil) Christian Fittipaldi (Canada) Paul Tracy (United States) Terry Borcheller (Germany) Ralf Kelleners (United States) Forest Barber	Pontiac 5.0 L V8	328
50 DNF	DP	18	(United States) Chase Competition Engineering/CB Motorsports	(United States) John Miller (United States) Chris Bingham (United States) Steven Ivankovich (Canada) Tony Burgess (United States) Vic Rice	Chase CCE-001	297
50 DNF	DP	18	(United States) Chase Competition Engineering/CB Motorsports	(United States) John Miller (United States) Chris Bingham (United States) Steven Ivankovich (Canada) Tony Burgess (United States) Vic Rice	Pontiac 5.0 L V8	297
51 DNF	DP	79	(United States) Newman/Haas Racing/Silverstone Racing	(Brazil) Cristiano da Matta (France) Sébastien Bourdais (United States) Paul Newman (United States) Mike Brockman	Crawford DP03	290
51 DNF	DP	79	(United States) Newman/Haas Racing/Silverstone Racing	(Brazil) Cristiano da Matta (France) Sébastien Bourdais (United States) Paul Newman (United States) Mike Brockman	Ford 5.0 L V8	290
52 DNF	GT	64	(United States) The Racer's Group	(Portugal) Pedro Courceiro (France) Cyrille Sauvage (Portugal) Miguel Amaral (United States) Joe Policastro (United States) Joe Policastro Jr.	Porsche 996 GT3 Cup	276
52 DNF	GT	64	(United States) The Racer's Group	(Portugal) Pedro Courceiro (France) Cyrille Sauvage (Portugal) Miguel Amaral (United States) Joe Policastro (United States) Joe Policastro Jr.	Porsche 3.6 L Flat-6	276
53 DNF	GT	00	(Australia) Aussie Assault	(New Zealand) Craig Baird (Australia) Paul Morris (Australia) Marcos Ambrose (Australia) John Teulan	Porsche 996 GT3 Cup	271
53 DNF	GT	00	(Australia) Aussie Assault	(New Zealand) Craig Baird (Australia) Paul Morris (Australia) Marcos Ambrose (Australia) John Teulan	Porsche 3.6 L Flat-6	271
54 DNF	DP	39	(United States) Orbit Racing	(Belgium) Marc Goossens (United Kingdom) Guy Smith (United States) Scott Sharp (United States) Jim Matthews	Riley Mk XI	239
54 DNF	DP	39	(United States) Orbit Racing	(Belgium) Marc Goossens (United Kingdom) Guy Smith (United States) Scott Sharp (United States) Jim Matthews	Pontiac 5.0 L V8	239
55 DNF	DP	50	(United States) Blackforest Motorsports	(United States) Jeff Bucknum (United States) Tom Nastasi (United States) Henry Zogaib (United States) Doug Peterson (United States) Travis Duder	Multimatic MDP1	223
55 DNF	DP	50	(United States) Blackforest Motorsports	(United States) Jeff Bucknum (United States) Tom Nastasi (United States) Henry Zogaib (United States) Doug Peterson (United States) Travis Duder	Ford 5.0 L V8	223
56 DNF	GT	48	(United States) Xtreme Racing Group	(Switzerland) Toni Seiler (Switzerland) Hans Hauser (United States) Anthony Puelo (Switzerland) Robert Dubler	Chevrolet Corvette	218
56 DNF	GT	48	(United States) Xtreme Racing Group	(Switzerland) Toni Seiler (Switzerland) Hans Hauser (United States) Anthony Puelo (Switzerland) Robert Dubler	Chevrolet 5.7 L V8	218
57 DNF	GT	21	(United States) Prototype Technology Group, Inc.	(United States) Bill Auberlen (United States) Joey Hand (United Kingdom) Ian James (United States) Chris Gleason	BMW M3 E46	199
57 DNF	GT	21	(United States) Prototype Technology Group, Inc.	(United States) Bill Auberlen (United States) Joey Hand (United Kingdom) Ian James (United States) Chris Gleason	BMW 3.2 L I6	199
58 DNF	DP	09	(United States) Spirit of Daytona Racing	(United States) Doug Goad (France) Stéphane Grégoire (Brazil) Roberto Moreno (United States) Bob Ward	Crawford DP03	194
58 DNF	DP	09	(United States) Spirit of Daytona Racing	(United States) Doug Goad (France) Stéphane Grégoire (Brazil) Roberto Moreno (United States) Bob Ward	Pontiac 5.0 L V8	194
59 DNF	GT	22	(United States) Prototype Technology Group, Inc.	(United States) Justin Marks (United States) Tommy Milner (United States) Kelly Collins (United States) R. J. Valentine	BMW M3 E46	168
59 DNF	GT	22	(United States) Prototype Technology Group, Inc.	(United States) Justin Marks (United States) Tommy Milner (United States) Kelly Collins (United States) R. J. Valentine	BMW 3.2 L I6	168
60 DNF	DP	86	(United States) Synergy Racing	(United States) Peyton Sellers (United States) Arthur Urciuoli (United States) Jason Workman (United States) Steve Marshall	Picchio DP2	134
60 DNF	DP	86	(United States) Synergy Racing	(United States) Peyton Sellers (United States) Arthur Urciuoli (United States) Jason Workman (United States) Steve Marshall	BMW 5.0 L V8	134
61 DNF	GT	93	(United States) TPC Racing	(United States) Guy Cosmo (United States) Dave Stewart (United States) Rob Stewart (United States) Gary Stewart (United States) Bob Gilbert	Porsche 996 GT3 Cup	85
61 DNF	GT	93	(United States) TPC Racing	(United States) Guy Cosmo (United States) Dave Stewart (United States) Rob Stewart (United States) Gary Stewart (United States) Bob Gilbert	Porsche 3.6 L Flat-6	85
62 DNF	GT	46	(United States) Michael Baughman Racing	(United States) Michael Baughman (United States) Mike Yeakle	Chevrolet Corvette	20
62 DNF	GT	46	(United States) Michael Baughman Racing	(United States) Michael Baughman (United States) Mike Yeakle	Chevrolet 5.7 L V8	20
