= 2007 Rolex Sports Car Series =

8th season of the racing series organized by Grand-Am

Seasons
- ← 2006 2008 →

The 2007 Rolex Sports Car Series season was the eighth season of the Grand-Am Rolex Sports Car Series presented by Crown Royal Special Reserve. The 15-race championship for Daytona Prototypes and GT cars began January 27, 2007 and concluded on September 15, 2007. Alex Gurney and Jon Fogarty shared the Daytona Prototype title, while Dirk Werner won the GT title.

== Schedule ==
2007 marked the first time the Sonoma race did not feature the GT class. Phoenix was dropped in favor of Iowa Speedway, and Long Beach was dropped for Circuit Gilles Villeneuve.

Rnd	Race	Circuit	Class	Distance/Duration	Date
1	(United States) Rolex 24 At Daytona	Daytona International Speedway	Both	24 hours	January 27; January 28
2	Mexico City 400k	Autódromo Hermanos Rodríguez	Both	400 km (250 mi)	March 3
3	(United States) Linder Industrial Komatsu Grand Prix of Miami	Homestead-Miami Speedway	Both	2 hours, 30 minutes	March 24
4	(United States) VIR 400	Virginia International Raceway	Both (split races)	250 mi (400 km)	April 29
5	(United States) U.S. Sports Car Invitational	Mazda Raceway Laguna Seca	Both (split races)	2 hours, 30 minutes	May 20
6	(United States) Rolex GT Series Challenge	Lime Rock Park	GT	2 hours, 30 minutes	May 28
7	(United States) Sahlen's Six Hours of the Glen	Watkins Glen International	Both	6 hours	June 9
8	(United States) EMCO Gears Classic	Mid-Ohio Sports Car Course	Both (split races)	250 mi (400 km)	June 24
9	(United States) Brumos Porsche 250	Daytona International Speedway	Both	250 mi (400 km)	July 5
10	(United States) Iowa 400k	Iowa Speedway	Both (split races)	250 mi (400 km)	July 14
11	(United States) Porsche 250 presented by Bradley Arant	Barber Motorsports Park	Both (split races)	2 hours, 30 minutes	July 22
12	(Canada) Montreal 400k	Circuit Gilles Villeneuve	Both	2 hours, 30 minutes	August 3
13	(United States) Crown Royal 200 at the Glen	Watkins Glen International	DP	200 mi (320 km)	August 10
14	(United States) Armed Forces Grand-Am 250	Infineon Raceway	DP	2 hours, 30 minutes	August 25
15	(United States) Sunchaser 1000k	Miller Motorsports Park	Both	1,000 km (620 mi)	September 15

== Entries ==
=== Daytona Prototype (DP) ===
Team	Chassis	Engine	No.	Drivers	Rounds
(United States) Southard Motorsports	Riley MkXI	BMW	3	(United States) Shane Lewis	All
(United States) Southard Motorsports	Riley MkXI	BMW	3	(United States) Randy Ruhlman	1–5, 7–10, 12–14
(United States) Southard Motorsports	Riley MkXI	BMW	3	(United States) Graham Rahal	1
(United States) Southard Motorsports	Riley MkXI	BMW	3	(United States) Elliott Forbes-Robinson	1
(United States) Southard Motorsports	Riley MkXI	BMW	3	(United States) Mark Martin	10
(United States) Southard Motorsports	Riley MkXI	BMW	3	(United States) Guy Cosmo	11
(United States) Southard Motorsports	Riley MkXI	BMW	3	(United States) Eric Lux	15
(United States) Michael Shank Racing	Riley MkXI	Lexus	6	(United Kingdom) Ian James	All
(United States) Michael Shank Racing	Riley MkXI	Lexus	6	(United States) John Pew	5, 7–15
(United States) Michael Shank Racing	Riley MkXI	Lexus	6	(United States) Henri Zogaib	1–3, 15
(United States) Michael Shank Racing	Riley MkXI	Lexus	6	(Canada) Paul Tracy	1
(United States) Michael Shank Racing	Riley MkXI	Lexus	6	(United States) A. J. Allmendinger	1
(United States) Michael Shank Racing	Riley MkXI	Lexus	6	(United States) Burt Frisselle	4
(United States) Michael Shank Racing	Riley MkXI	Lexus	60	(Brazil) Oswaldo Negri Jr.	All
(United States) Michael Shank Racing	Riley MkXI	Lexus	60	(South Africa) Mark Patterson	All
(United States) Michael Shank Racing	Riley MkXI	Lexus	60	(Brazil) Hélio Castroneves	1
(United States) Michael Shank Racing	Riley MkXI	Lexus	60	(United States) Sam Hornish Jr.	1
(United States) Michael Shank Racing	Riley MkXI	Lexus	60	(United Kingdom) Justin Wilson	15
(United States) SAMAX Motorsport	Riley MkXI	Pontiac	7	(Czech Republic) Tomáš Enge	1
(United States) SAMAX Motorsport	Riley MkXI	Pontiac	7	(United States) Chris Festa	1
(United States) SAMAX Motorsport	Riley MkXI	Pontiac	7	(San Marino) Christian Montanari	1
(United States) SAMAX Motorsport	Riley MkXI	Pontiac	7	(United States) Kris Szekeres	1
(United States) SAMAX Motorsport	Riley MkXI	Pontiac	7	(United States) Roger Yasukawa	1
(United States) SAMAX Motorsport	Riley MkXI	Pontiac	11	(Canada) Patrick Carpentier	1–3, 5, 7–12
(United States) SAMAX Motorsport	Riley MkXI	Pontiac	11	(United States) Kris Szekeres	8–13, 15
(United States) SAMAX Motorsport	Riley MkXI	Pontiac	11	(United Kingdom) Ryan Dalziel	1, 4–5, 15
(United States) SAMAX Motorsport	Riley MkXI	Pontiac	11	(Czech Republic) Tomáš Enge	7, 13–15
(United States) SAMAX Motorsport	Riley MkXI	Pontiac	11	(Venezuela) Milka Duno	1–3
(United States) SAMAX Motorsport	Riley MkXI	Pontiac	11	(United Kingdom) Darren Manning	1
(United States) SAMAX Motorsport	Riley MkXI	Pontiac	11	(Canada) Jean-François Dumoulin	4
(United States) SAMAX Motorsport	Riley MkXI	Pontiac	11	(Canada) Antoine Bessette	7
(United States) SAMAX Motorsport	Riley MkXI	Pontiac	11	(United States) Roger Yasukawa	14
(United States) Tuttle Team Racing	Riley MkXI	Pontiac	7	(United States) Brian Tuttle	13
(United States) Tuttle Team Racing	Riley MkXI	Pontiac	7	(France) Jonathan Cochet	13
(United States) Synergy Racing	Doran JE4	Porsche	8	(United States) Rick Knoop	13–14
(United States) Synergy Racing	Doran JE4	Porsche	8	(United States) David Murry	13–14
(United States) SunTrust Racing	Riley MkXI	Pontiac	10	(Italy) Max Angelelli	All
(United States) SunTrust Racing	Riley MkXI	Pontiac	10	(Denmark) Jan Magnussen	1–5, 10, 12, 15
(United States) SunTrust Racing	Riley MkXI	Pontiac	10	(France) Jonathan Cochet	7–9
(United States) SunTrust Racing	Riley MkXI	Pontiac	10	(United States) Memo Gidley	11, 13–14
(United States) SunTrust Racing	Riley MkXI	Pontiac	10	(South Africa) Wayne Taylor	1, 7
(United States) SunTrust Racing	Riley MkXI	Pontiac	10	(United States) Jeff Gordon	1
(United States) RVO Motorsports	Riley MkXI	Pontiac	12	(United States) Roger Schramm	1, 3–5, 7–8, 15
(United States) RVO Motorsports	Riley MkXI	Pontiac	12	(United Kingdom) Justin Bell	1, 4–5, 7–8, 15
(United States) RVO Motorsports	Riley MkXI	Pontiac	12	(United States) Bill Lester	1, 3, 15
(United States) RVO Motorsports	Riley MkXI	Pontiac	12	(United States) Jack Baldwin	1
(United States) RVO Motorsports	Riley MkXI	Pontiac	12	(United States) John Heinricy	1
(United States) Howard Motorsports	Crawford DP03	Porsche	16	(United States) Chris Dyson	1, 3–4, 7, 9
(United States) Howard Motorsports	Crawford DP03	Porsche	16	(United States) Rob Dyson	1, 4, 7, 9, 13
(United States) Howard Motorsports	Crawford DP03	Porsche	16	(United Kingdom) Oliver Gavin	1
(United States) Howard Motorsports	Crawford DP03	Porsche	16	(United Kingdom) Guy Smith	1
(United States) Howard Motorsports	Crawford DP03	Porsche	16	(United Kingdom) Andy Wallace	3
(United States) Howard Motorsports	Crawford DP03	Porsche	16	(United States) Butch Leitzinger	7
(United States) Howard Motorsports	Crawford DP03	Porsche	16	(United States) Andy Lally	13
(United States) Howard Motorsports	Crawford DP03	Porsche	20	(United States) Butch Leitzinger	1
(United States) Howard Motorsports	Crawford DP03	Porsche	20	(United States) Tony Stewart	1
(United States) Howard Motorsports	Crawford DP03	Porsche	20	(United Kingdom) Andy Wallace	1
(Germany) VICI Racing	Fabcar FDSC/03	Porsche	18	(Germany) Uwe Alzen	1
(Germany) VICI Racing	Fabcar FDSC/03	Porsche	18	(United States) Terry Borcheller	1
(Germany) VICI Racing	Fabcar FDSC/03	Porsche	18	(Argentina) Gastón Mazzacane	1
(Germany) VICI Racing	Fabcar FDSC/03	Porsche	18	(Germany) Robert Renauer	1
(United States) Finlay Motorsports	Crawford DP03	Ford	19	(United States) Rob Finlay	1–3
(United States) Finlay Motorsports	Crawford DP03	Ford	19	(Canada) Michael Valiante	1–3
(United States) Finlay Motorsports	Crawford DP03	Ford	19	(United States) Bobby Labonte	1
(United States) Finlay Motorsports	Crawford DP03	Ford	19	(United States) Michael McDowell	1
(United States) Chip Ganassi with Felix Sabates	Riley MkXI	Lexus	19	(Canada) Michael Valiante	4–5, 7–15
(United States) Chip Ganassi with Felix Sabates	Riley MkXI	Lexus	19	(United States) Rob Finlay	4–5, 7–13
(United States) Chip Ganassi with Felix Sabates	Riley MkXI	Lexus	19	(United Kingdom) Alex Lloyd	14
(United States) Chip Ganassi with Felix Sabates	Riley MkXI	Lexus	19	(United States) Dane Cameron	15
(United States) TELMEX Chip Ganassi with Felix Sabates	Riley MkXI	Lexus	01	(United States) Scott Pruett	All
(United States) TELMEX Chip Ganassi with Felix Sabates	Riley MkXI	Lexus	01	(Mexico) Salvador Durán	1, 15
(United States) TELMEX Chip Ganassi with Felix Sabates	Riley MkXI	Lexus	01	(Colombia) Juan Pablo Montoya	1
(United States) TELMEX Chip Ganassi with Felix Sabates	Riley MkXI	Lexus	01	(Mexico) Memo Rojas	2–5, 7–15
(United States) Target Chip Ganassi with Felix Sabates	Riley MkXI	Lexus	02	(Mexico) Memo Rojas	1
(United States) Target Chip Ganassi with Felix Sabates	Riley MkXI	Lexus	02	(New Zealand) Scott Dixon	1
(United States) Target Chip Ganassi with Felix Sabates	Riley MkXI	Lexus	02	(United Kingdom) Dan Wheldon	1
(United States) Alex Job Racing (United States) Ruby Tuesday Championship Racing	Crawford DP03	Porsche	23	(United States) Patrick Long	All
(United States) Alex Job Racing (United States) Ruby Tuesday Championship Racing	Crawford DP03	Porsche	23	(Germany) Jörg Bergmeister	1–5, 7–12, 15
(United States) Alex Job Racing (United States) Ruby Tuesday Championship Racing	Crawford DP03	Porsche	23	(France) Romain Dumas	1
(United States) Alex Job Racing (United States) Ruby Tuesday Championship Racing	Crawford DP03	Porsche	23	(France) Emmanuel Collard	13
(United States) Alex Job Racing (United States) Ruby Tuesday Championship Racing	Crawford DP03	Porsche	23	(United States) Terry Borcheller	14
(United States) Alex Job Racing (United States) Ruby Tuesday Championship Racing	Crawford DP03	Porsche	23	(Germany) Mike Rockenfeller	15
(United States) Matt Connolly Motorsports	Chase CCE-01	Pontiac	31	(United States) Matt Connolly	13
(United States) Matt Connolly Motorsports	Chase CCE-01	Pontiac	31	(United States) Mike Halpin	13
(United States) Matt Connolly Motorsports	Chase CCE-01	Pontiac	31	(United States) Ted Ballou	15
(United States) Matt Connolly Motorsports	Chase CCE-01	Pontiac	31	(United States) Seth Ingram	15
(United States) Matt Connolly Motorsports	Chase CCE-01	Pontiac	31	(United States) Keith Rossberg	15
(United States) Cheever Racing	Crawford DP03 (r1) Fabcar FDSC/03	Porsche	39	(Brazil) Christian Fittipaldi	All
(United States) Cheever Racing	Crawford DP03 (r1) Fabcar FDSC/03	Porsche	39	(United States) Harrison Brix	2–5, 7–11, 14–15
(United States) Cheever Racing	Crawford DP03 (r1) Fabcar FDSC/03	Porsche	39	(Spain) Antonio García	7, 12–13
(United States) Cheever Racing	Crawford DP03 (r1) Fabcar FDSC/03	Porsche	39	(France) Emmanuel Collard	1
(United States) Cheever Racing	Crawford DP03 (r1) Fabcar FDSC/03	Porsche	39	(Germany) Sascha Maassen	1
(United States) Cheever Racing	Crawford DP03 (r1) Fabcar FDSC/03	Porsche	39	(United States) Richard Antinucci	15
(United States) Cheever Racing	Fabcar FDSC/03	Porsche	51	(United States) Harrison Brix	1
(United States) Cheever Racing	Fabcar FDSC/03	Porsche	51	(United States) Eddie Cheever	1
(United States) Cheever Racing	Fabcar FDSC/03	Porsche	51	(Brazil) Thomas Erdos	1
(United States) Cheever Racing	Fabcar FDSC/03	Porsche	51	(United Kingdom) Mike Newton	1
(United States) TruSpeed Motorsports	Riley MkXI	Porsche	47	(Germany) Timo Bernhard	1
(United States) TruSpeed Motorsports	Riley MkXI	Porsche	47	(United States) Charles Morgan	1
(United States) TruSpeed Motorsports	Riley MkXI	Porsche	47	(United States) Rob Morgan	1
(United States) TruSpeed Motorsports	Riley MkXI	Porsche	47	(United States) B. J. Zacharias	1
(United States) Playboy Racing / Unitech	Riley MkXI	Pontiac	53	(United States) Mike Borkowski	4
(United States) Playboy Racing / Unitech	Riley MkXI	Pontiac	53	(United States) Tommy Constantine	4
(United States) Multimatic Motorsports	Multimatic MDP1	Ford	55	(United States) Gunnar Jeannette	12
(United States) Multimatic Motorsports	Multimatic MDP1	Ford	55	(Canada) Scott Maxwell	12
(United States) Red Bull/Brumos Porsche	Riley MkXI	Porsche	58	(United States) David Donohue	All
(United States) Red Bull/Brumos Porsche	Riley MkXI	Porsche	58	(United States) Darren Law	All
(United States) Red Bull/Brumos Porsche	Riley MkXI	Porsche	58	(United States) Buddy Rice	1, 15
(United States) Red Bull/Brumos Porsche	Riley MkXI	Porsche	58	(United States) Scott Sharp	1
(United States) Brumos Porsche/Kendall	Riley MkXI	Porsche	59	(United States) Hurley Haywood	All
(United States) Brumos Porsche/Kendall	Riley MkXI	Porsche	59	(United States) J. C. France	1–5, 7–9, 11–15
(United States) Brumos Porsche/Kendall	Riley MkXI	Porsche	59	(Portugal) João Barbosa	1, 7
(United States) Brumos Porsche/Kendall	Riley MkXI	Porsche	59	(Brazil) Roberto Moreno	1
(United States) Brumos Porsche/Kendall	Riley MkXI	Porsche	59	(United States) Guy Cosmo	10
(United States) Brumos Porsche/Kendall	Riley MkXI	Porsche	59	(United States) Terry Borcheller	15
(Canada) Exchange Traded Gold AIM Autosport	Riley MkXI	Lexus	61	(Canada) Mark Wilkins	All
(Canada) Exchange Traded Gold AIM Autosport	Riley MkXI	Lexus	61	(United States) Brian Frisselle	1–2, 4, 7–8, 10, 12, 14–15
(Canada) Exchange Traded Gold AIM Autosport	Riley MkXI	Lexus	61	(United States) Burt Frisselle	1, 3, 5, 7, 9, 11, 13, 15
(Canada) Exchange Traded Gold AIM Autosport	Riley MkXI	Lexus	61	(Canada) David Empringham	1
(United States) Krohn Racing	Riley MkXI	Pontiac	75	(United States) Colin Braun	1–5, 7–13, 15
(United States) Krohn Racing	Riley MkXI	Pontiac	75	(Italy) Max Papis	1–5, 7–10
(United States) Krohn Racing	Riley MkXI	Pontiac	75	(Sweden) Niclas Jönsson	11–15
(United States) Krohn Racing	Riley MkXI	Pontiac	75	(Finland) J. J. Lehto	1
(United States) Krohn Racing	Riley MkXI	Pontiac	75	(Brazil) Ricardo Zonta	14
(United States) Krohn Racing	Riley MkXI	Pontiac	76	(United States) Tracy Krohn	All
(United States) Krohn Racing	Riley MkXI	Pontiac	76	(Sweden) Niclas Jönsson	1–5, 7–10
(United States) Krohn Racing	Riley MkXI	Pontiac	76	(Italy) Max Papis	11–15
(United States) Krohn Racing	Riley MkXI	Pontiac	76	(United States) Boris Said	1
(United States) Feeds The Need/Doran Racing	Doran JE4	Ford	77	(United States) Memo Gidley	1–5, 7–8, 15
(United States) Feeds The Need/Doran Racing	Doran JE4	Ford	77	(Mexico) Jorge Goeters	2–4
(United States) Feeds The Need/Doran Racing	Doran JE4	Ford	77	(United States) Guy Cosmo	5, 7–8
(United States) Feeds The Need/Doran Racing	Doran JE4	Ford	77	(Italy) Fabrizio Gollin	1
(United States) Feeds The Need/Doran Racing	Doran JE4	Ford	77	(Mexico) Michel Jourdain Jr.	1
(United States) Feeds The Need/Doran Racing	Doran JE4	Ford	77	(Spain) Oriol Servià	1
(United States) Feeds The Need/Doran Racing	Doran JE4	Ford	77	(United States) Brad Jaeger	15
(United States) Robinson Racing	Riley MkXI	Pontiac	84	(United States) Paul Dallenbach	1
(United States) Robinson Racing	Riley MkXI	Pontiac	84	(United States) Wally Dallenbach Jr.	1
(United States) Robinson Racing	Riley MkXI	Pontiac	84	(United Kingdom) Katherine Legge	1
(United States) Robinson Racing	Riley MkXI	Pontiac	84	(United States) George Robinson	1
(United States) Lowe's Riley-Matthews Motorsports	Riley MkXI	Pontiac	91	(United States) Jim Matthews	1–5, 7–8, 10–15
(United States) Lowe's Riley-Matthews Motorsports	Riley MkXI	Pontiac	91	(Belgium) Marc Goossens	1–5, 7, 9–15
(United States) Lowe's Riley-Matthews Motorsports	Riley MkXI	Pontiac	91	(United States) Ryan Hunter-Reay	1, 7–8, 15
(United States) Lowe's Riley-Matthews Motorsports	Riley MkXI	Pontiac	91	(United States) Jimmie Johnson	1, 9
(United States) GAINSCO/Bob Stallings Racing	Riley MkXI	Pontiac	99	(United States) Jon Fogarty	All
(United States) GAINSCO/Bob Stallings Racing	Riley MkXI	Pontiac	99	(United States) Alex Gurney	All
(United States) GAINSCO/Bob Stallings Racing	Riley MkXI	Pontiac	99	(United States) Jimmy Vasser	1, 15
(United States) Vision Racing	Crawford DP03	Porsche	00	(United States) Ed Carpenter	1
(United States) Vision Racing	Crawford DP03	Porsche	00	(United States) A. J. Foyt IV	1
(United States) Vision Racing	Crawford DP03	Porsche	00	(United States) Tony George	1
(United States) Vision Racing	Crawford DP03	Porsche	00	(France) Stéphan Grégoire	1
(United States) Vision Racing	Crawford DP03	Porsche	00	(South Africa) Tomas Scheckter	1
(United States) Sigalsport BMW	Riley MkXI	BMW	05	(United States) Matthew Alhadeff	All
(United States) Sigalsport BMW	Riley MkXI	BMW	05	(United States) Bill Auberlen	All
(United States) Sigalsport BMW	Riley MkXI	BMW	05	(United States) Joey Hand	7, 15
(United States) Sigalsport BMW	Riley MkXI	BMW	05	(United States) Gene Sigal	1
(United States) Sigalsport BMW	Riley MkXI	BMW	05	(Austria) Karl Wendlinger	1
(United States) Spirit of Daytona Racing	Fabcar FDSC/03	Porsche	09	(Canada) Marc-Antoine Camirand	15
(United States) Spirit of Daytona Racing	Fabcar FDSC/03	Porsche	09	(United States) Guy Cosmo	15
(United States) Spirit of Daytona Racing	Fabcar FDSC/03	Porsche	09	(United States) Doug Goad	15

== Confirmed entrants ==
No	Team	Drivers	Engine
No	Team	Drivers	Chassis
Daytona Prototype
00	(United States) Vision Racing	(United States) Ed Carpenter (South Africa) Tomas Scheckter (United States) Tony George (United States) A. J. Foyt IV	Porsche 3.99L GT3R F6
00	(United States) Vision Racing	(United States) Ed Carpenter (South Africa) Tomas Scheckter (United States) Tony George (United States) A. J. Foyt IV	Riley Technologies MkXI
01	(United States) TELMEX Chip Ganassi Racing with Felix Sabates	(United States) Scott Pruett (Mexico) Salvador Durán (Colombia) Juan Pablo Montoya	Lexus 5.0L V8
01	(United States) TELMEX Chip Ganassi Racing with Felix Sabates	(United States) Scott Pruett (Mexico) Salvador Durán (Colombia) Juan Pablo Montoya	Riley Technologies MkXI
02	(United States) Target Chip Ganassi Racing	(New Zealand) Scott Dixon (United Kingdom) Dan Wheldon (Mexico) Memo Rojas	Lexus 5.0L V8
02	(United States) Target Chip Ganassi Racing	(New Zealand) Scott Dixon (United Kingdom) Dan Wheldon (Mexico) Memo Rojas	Riley Technologies MkXI
3	(United States) Southard Motorsports	(United States) Shane Lewis (United States) Randy Ruhlman (United States) Graham Rahal	Lexus 5.0L V8
3	(United States) Southard Motorsports	(United States) Shane Lewis (United States) Randy Ruhlman (United States) Graham Rahal	Riley Technologies MkXI
05	(United States) Sigalsport BMW	(United States) Bill Auberlen (United States) Matthew Alhadeff (Austria) Karl Wendlinger (United States) Gene Sigal	BMW S62-B50 5.0L V8
05	(United States) Sigalsport BMW	(United States) Bill Auberlen (United States) Matthew Alhadeff (Austria) Karl Wendlinger (United States) Gene Sigal	Riley Technologies MkXI
6	(United States) Michael Shank Racing	(United States) Henri Zogaib (United Kingdom) Ian James (Canada) Paul Tracy (United States) A. J. Allmendinger	Lexus 5.0L V8
6	(United States) Michael Shank Racing	(United States) Henri Zogaib (United Kingdom) Ian James (Canada) Paul Tracy (United States) A. J. Allmendinger	Riley Technologies MkXI
7	(United States) SAMAX	(United Kingdom) Tom Kimber-Smith (Czech Republic) Tomáš Enge (United States) Jeff Bucknum	Pontiac 5.0L V8
7	(United States) SAMAX	(United Kingdom) Tom Kimber-Smith (Czech Republic) Tomáš Enge (United States) Jeff Bucknum	Riley Technologies MkXI
10	(United States) SunTrust Racing	(South Africa) Wayne Taylor (Italy) Max Angelelli (United States) Jeff Gordon (Denmark) Jan Magnussen	Pontiac 5.0L V8
10	(United States) SunTrust Racing	(South Africa) Wayne Taylor (Italy) Max Angelelli (United States) Jeff Gordon (Denmark) Jan Magnussen	Riley Technologies MkXI
11	(United States) Citgo SAMAX	(United Kingdom) Darren Manning (Venezuela) Milka Duno (United Kingdom) Ryan Dalziel (Canada) Patrick Carpentier	Pontiac 5.0L V8
11	(United States) Citgo SAMAX	(United Kingdom) Darren Manning (Venezuela) Milka Duno (United Kingdom) Ryan Dalziel (Canada) Patrick Carpentier	Riley Technologies MkXI
16	(United States) Howard Motorsports	(United States) Chris Dyson (United States) Rob Dyson (United Kingdom) Guy Smith (United Kingdom) Oliver Gavin	Porsche 3.99L GT3R F6
16	(United States) Howard Motorsports	(United States) Chris Dyson (United States) Rob Dyson (United Kingdom) Guy Smith (United Kingdom) Oliver Gavin	Crawford DP03
18	(Germany) VICI Racing	(Germany) Uwe Alzen (Germany) Robert Renauer (United States) Terry Borcheller (Argentina) Gastón Mazzacane	Porsche 3.99L GT3R F6
18	(Germany) VICI Racing	(Germany) Uwe Alzen (Germany) Robert Renauer (United States) Terry Borcheller (Argentina) Gastón Mazzacane	Fabcar FDSC03
19	(United States) Finlay Motorsports	(United States) Rob Finlay (Canada) Michael Valiante (United States) Bobby Labonte (United States) Michael McDowell	Ford 5.0L V8
19	(United States) Finlay Motorsports	(United States) Rob Finlay (Canada) Michael Valiante (United States) Bobby Labonte (United States) Michael McDowell	Crawford DP03
20	(United States) Howard Motorsports	(United Kingdom) Andy Wallace (United States) Butch Leitzinger (United States) Tony Stewart	Pontiac 5.0L V8
20	(United States) Howard Motorsports	(United Kingdom) Andy Wallace (United States) Butch Leitzinger (United States) Tony Stewart	Crawford DP03
23	(United States) Ruby Tuesday Championship Racing	(United States) Patrick Long (Germany) Jörg Bergmeister (France) Romain Dumas	Porsche 3.99L GT3R F6
23	(United States) Ruby Tuesday Championship Racing	(United States) Patrick Long (Germany) Jörg Bergmeister (France) Romain Dumas	Crawford DP03
39	(United States) Cheever Racing	(Brazil) Christian Fittipaldi (United States) Eddie Cheever (France) Emmanuel Collard (Germany) Sascha Maassen	Porsche 3.99L GT3R F6
39	(United States) Cheever Racing	(Brazil) Christian Fittipaldi (United States) Eddie Cheever (France) Emmanuel Collard (Germany) Sascha Maassen	Crawford DP03
47	(United States) TruSpeed Motorsports	(United States) Charles Morgan (United States) Rob Morgan (Germany) Timo Bernhard (United States) B. J. Zacharias	Porsche 3.99L GT3R F6
47	(United States) TruSpeed Motorsports	(United States) Charles Morgan (United States) Rob Morgan (Germany) Timo Bernhard (United States) B. J. Zacharias	Riley Technologies MkXI
51	(United States) Cheever Racing	(United Kingdom) Mike Newton (Brazil) Tommy Erdos (United States) Harrison Brix	Porsche 3.99L GT3R F6
51	(United States) Cheever Racing	(United Kingdom) Mike Newton (Brazil) Tommy Erdos (United States) Harrison Brix	Fabcar FDSC03
58	(United States) Brumos Racing	(United States) David Donohue (United States) Darren Law (United States) Buddy Rice (United States) Scott Sharp	Porsche 3.99L GT3R F6
58	(United States) Brumos Racing	(United States) David Donohue (United States) Darren Law (United States) Buddy Rice (United States) Scott Sharp	Riley Technologies MkXI
59	(United States) Brumos Porsche	(United States) Hurley Haywood (United States) J. C. France (Brazil) Roberto Moreno (Portugal) João Barbosa	Porsche 3.99L GT3R F6
59	(United States) Brumos Porsche	(United States) Hurley Haywood (United States) J. C. France (Brazil) Roberto Moreno (Portugal) João Barbosa	Riley Technologies MkXI
60	(United States) Michael Shank Racing	(South Africa) Mark Patterson (Brazil) Oswaldo Negri Jr. (Brazil) Hélio Castroneves (United States) Sam Hornish Jr.	Lexus 5.0L V8
60	(United States) Michael Shank Racing	(South Africa) Mark Patterson (Brazil) Oswaldo Negri Jr. (Brazil) Hélio Castroneves (United States) Sam Hornish Jr.	Riley Technologies MkXI
75	(United States) Krohn Racing	(United States) Colin Braun (Italy) Max Papis (Finland) JJ Lehto	Pontiac 5.0L V8
75	(United States) Krohn Racing	(United States) Colin Braun (Italy) Max Papis (Finland) JJ Lehto	Riley Technologies MkXI
76	(United States) Krohn Racing	(United States) Tracy Krohn (Sweden) Nic Jönsson (United States) Boris Said	Pontiac 5.0L V8
76	(United States) Krohn Racing	(United States) Tracy Krohn (Sweden) Nic Jönsson (United States) Boris Said	Riley Technologies MkXI
91	(United States) Riley-Matthews Motorsports	(United States) Jim Matthews (Belgium) Marc Goossens (United States) Jimmie Johnson (United States) Ryan Hunter-Reay	Pontiac 5.0L V8
91	(United States) Riley-Matthews Motorsports	(United States) Jim Matthews (Belgium) Marc Goossens (United States) Jimmie Johnson (United States) Ryan Hunter-Reay	Riley Technologies MkXI
99	(United States) GAINSCO/Bob Stallings Racing	(United States) Alex Gurney (United States) Jon Fogarty (United States) Jimmy Vasser (United States) Bob Stallings	Pontiac 5.0L V8
99	(United States) GAINSCO/Bob Stallings Racing	(United States) Alex Gurney (United States) Jon Fogarty (United States) Jimmy Vasser (United States) Bob Stallings	Riley Technologies MkXI
Grand Touring
65	(United States) The Racer's Group	(United States) (United States)	Porsche 3.6L F6
65	(United States) The Racer's Group	(United States) (United States)	Porsche 997 GT3 Cup
66	(United States) The Racer's Group	(United States) Andy Lally (United States) R. J. Valentine	Porsche 3.6L F6
66	(United States) The Racer's Group	(United States) Andy Lally (United States) R. J. Valentine	Porsche 997 GT3 Cup
72	(United States) Tafel Racing	(United States) Andrew Davis (United Kingdom) Robin Liddell (United States) Jim Tafel	Porsche 3.6L F6
72	(United States) Tafel Racing	(United States) Andrew Davis (United Kingdom) Robin Liddell (United States) Jim Tafel	Porsche 997 GT3 Cup

== Season Results ==
Rnd	Circuit	DP Winning Team	GT Winning Team	Results
Rnd	Circuit	DP Winning Drivers	GT Winning Drivers	Results
1	Daytona	(United States) #01 Chip Ganassi Racing	(United States) #22 Alegra Motorsports	Results
1	Daytona	(United States) Scott Pruett (Mexico) Salvador Durán (Colombia) Juan Pablo Montoya	(Canada) Jean-François Dumoulin (United States) Carlos de Quesada (United States) Scooter Gabel (Germany) Marc Basseng	Results
2	Hermanos Rodriguez	(United States) #99 GAINSCO/Bob Stallings Racing	(United States) #70 SpeedSource	Results
2	Hermanos Rodriguez	(United States) Alex Gurney (United States) Jon Fogarty	(Canada) Sylvain Tremblay (United Kingdom) Nick Ham	Results
3	Homestead	(United States) #05 Sigalsport BMW	(United States) #70 SpeedSource	Results
3	Homestead	(United States) Bill Auberlen (United States) Matthew Alhadeff	(Canada) Sylvain Tremblay (United Kingdom) Nick Ham	Results
4	Virginia	(United States) #10 SunTrust Racing	(Germany) #87 Farnbacher-Loles Racing	Results
4	Virginia	(Italy) Max Angelelli (Denmark) Jan Magnussen	(Germany) Dirk Werner (United States) Bryce Miller	Results
5	Laguna Seca	(United States) #23 Alex Job Racing	(United States) #66 The Racer's Group	Results
5	Laguna Seca	(United States) Patrick Long (Germany) Jörg Bergmeister	(United States) Andy Lally (United States) R. J. Valentine	Results
6	Lime Rock	Did not compete	(United States) #06 Banner Racing	Results
6	Lime Rock	Did not compete	(United States) Leighton Reese (United States) Tim Lewis Jr.	Results
7	Watkins Glen	(United States) #99 GAINSCO/Bob Stallings Racing	(United States) #66 The Racer's Group	Results
7	Watkins Glen	(United States) Alex Gurney (United States) Jon Fogarty	(United States) Andy Lally (United States) Spencer Pumpelly (United States) R. J. Valentine	Results
8	Mid-Ohio	(United States) #99 GAINSCO/Bob Stallings Racing	(United States) #66 The Racer's Group	Results
8	Mid-Ohio	(United States) Alex Gurney (United States) Jon Fogarty	(United States) Andy Lally (United States) R. J. Valentine	Results
9	Daytona	(United States) #99 GAINSCO/Bob Stallings Racing	(United States) #70 SpeedSource	Results
9	Daytona	(United States) Alex Gurney (United States) Jon Fogarty	(Canada) Sylvain Tremblay (United Kingdom) Nick Ham	Results
10	Iowa	(United States) #01 Chip Ganassi Racing	(United States) #66 The Racer's Group	Results
10	Iowa	(United States) Scott Pruett (Mexico) Memo Rojas	(United States) Andy Lally (United States) R. J. Valentine	Results
11	Barber	(United States) #99 GAINSCO/Bob Stallings Racing	(United States) #07 Banner Racing	Results
11	Barber	(United States) Alex Gurney (United States) Jon Fogarty	(United States) Paul Edwards (United States) Kelly Collins	Results
12	Gilles Villeneuve	(United States) #10 SunTrust Racing	(United States) #66 The Racer's Group	Results
12	Gilles Villeneuve	(Italy) Max Angelelli (Denmark) Jan Magnussen	(United States) Andy Lally (United States) R. J. Valentine	Results
13	Watkins Glen	(United States) #99 GAINSCO/Bob Stallings Racing	Did not compete	Results
13	Watkins Glen	(United States) Alex Gurney (United States) Jon Fogarty	Did not compete	Results
14	Infineon	(United States) #99 GAINSCO/Bob Stallings Racing	Did not compete	Results
14	Infineon	(United States) Alex Gurney (United States) Jon Fogarty	Did not compete	Results
15	Miller	(United States) #91 Riley-Matthews Motorsports	(United States) #07 Banner Racing	Results
15	Miller	(Belgium) Marc Goossens (United States) Ryan Hunter-Reay (United States) Jim Matthews	(United States) Paul Edwards (United States) Kelly Collins (United Kingdom) Andy Pilgrim	Results

== Standings ==
=== DP ===
Pos	Driver	R24 (United States)	MEX (Mexico)	HOM (United States)	VIR (United States)	LGA (United States)	S6H (United States)	MOH (United States)	DAY (United States)	IOW (United States)	BAR (United States)	MON (Canada)	WGL (United States)	SON (United States)	SLK (United States)	Pts
1	(United States) Alex Gurney	22	1	11	5	6	1	1	1	3	1	3	1	1	8	408
1	(United States) Jon Fogarty	22	1	11	5	6	1	1	1	3	1	3	1	1	8	408
2	(United States) Scott Pruett	1	4	3	8	2	2	2	6	1	5	5	3	3	9	406
3	(Italy) Max Angelelli	3	3	2	1	15	3	4	2	7	3	1	2	4	18	395
4	(Mexico) Memo Rojas	21	4	3	8	2	2	2	6	1	5	5	3	3	9	381
5	(United States) Colin Braun	11	2	8	2	8	12	3	3	4	2	12	11	EX	3	338
6	(United States) Darren Law	20	6	6	3	4	9	5	5	6	4	8	5	2	20	338
6	(United States) David Donohue	20	6	6	3	4	9	5	5	6	4	8	5	2	20	338
7	(United States) Patrick Long	12	5	9	9	1	8	6	14	10	8	17	9	7	5	319
8	(South Africa) Mark Patterson	9	9	15	11	3	11	9	7	5	6	6	8	8	10	319
8	(Brazil) Oswaldo Negri Jr.	9	9	15	11	3	11	9	7	5	6	6	8	8	10	319
9	(Italy) Max Papis	11	2	8	2	8	12	3	3	4	9	14	19	DNS	12	307
10	(United Kingdom) Ian James	16	10	12	6	7	4	10	4	9	7	11	16	10	7	307
Pos	Driver	R24 (United States)	MEX (Mexico)	HOM (United States)	VIR (United States)	LGA (United States)	S6H (United States)	MOH (United States)	DAY (United States)	IOW (United States)	BAR (United States)	MON (Canada)	WGL (United States)	SON (United States)	SLK (United States)	Pts

Colour	Result
Gold	Winner
Silver	2nd place
Bronze	3rd place
Green	Finished
Red	Did not finish
Black	Disqualified (DSQ)
White	Did not start (DNS)
Blank	Did not participate
Blank	Injured (INJ)
Blank	Excluded (EX)

† Colin Braun was suspended for the race in Sonoma by the GARRA for an incident during the race at Watkins Glen while on probation.

=== GT ===
Pos	Driver	Pts	DAY	MEX	HOM	VIR	MTY	LRP	WGL	MOH	DAY	IOW	BAR	MON	MIL
1	(Germany) Dirk Werner	375	14	4	3	1	3	2	2	12	3	3	3	2	3
2	(United States) Kelly Collins (United States) Paul Edwards	365	2	10	7	3	4	4	3	3	2	14	1	8	1
3	(United States) Bryce Miller	363	26	4	3	1	3	2	2	12	3	3	3	2	3
4	(United States) Andy Lally (United States) R. J. Valentine	348	17	8	2	10	1	10	1	1	9	1	2	1	23
5	(United States) Leighton Reese (United States) Tim Lewis, Jr.	316	4	14	10	12	10	1	7	6	6	2	4	5	16
6	(Canada) Sylvain Tremblay	314	5	1	1	2	7	11	22	2	1	13	5	9	†
7	(United Kingdom) Nick Ham	305	5	1	1	2	7	11	DNS	2	1	13	5	9	†
8	(United States) Carlos de Quesada	289	1	12	6	6	8	12	5	11	7	DNS	11	4	6
9	(Canada) Jean-François Dumoulin	281	1	12	6	6	8	12	5	11	7	DNS	11	4	14
10	(United States) Emil Assentato	275	7	3	16	11	9	19	8	19	8	5	10	12	4
Pos	Driver	Pts	DAY	MEX	HOM	VIR	MTY	LRP	WGL	MOH	DAY	IOW	BAR	MON	MIL

Colour	Result
Gold	Winner
Silver	2nd place
Bronze	3rd place
Green	Finished
Red	Did not finish
Black	Disqualified (DSQ)
White	Did not start (DNS)
Blank	Did not participate
Blank	Injured (INJ)
Blank	Excluded (EX)

† Not classified due to failure to complete a green-flag lap.
