= Crawford DP08 =

Crawford DP03
- Category: Daytona Prototype
- Constructor: Crawford
- Designer: Andy Scriven
- Production: 2008-2009
- Predecessor: Crawford DP03

Technical specifications
- Chassis: Carbon fiber monocoque
- Suspension (front): Unequal A-Arms w/Pull-Rod Activated Ohlins Shock Absorbers & Springs
- Suspension (rear): Unequal A-Arms w/Pull-Rod Activated Ohlins Shock Absorbers & Springs
- Length: 4,445 mm (175.0 in)
- Width: 2,007 mm (79.0 in)
- Height: 1,222 mm (48.1 in)
- Wheelbase: 2,845 mm (112.0 in)
- Engine: Porsche / Chevrolet / Pontiac 4,000–5,000 cc (4.0–5.0 L; 244.1–305.1 cu in) 24-valve to 32-valve, OHC/DOHC B6/V8, naturally-aspirated, mid-mounted
- Transmission: Emco 6-speed sequential
- Weight: 2,250 lb (1,020.6 kg)

Competition history
- Debut: 2008

The Crawford DP08 is a second-generation Daytona Prototype sports racing car, designed, developed and built by American manufacturer Crawford Composites, in 2008.
