= Dallara DP01 =

Sports prototype racecar

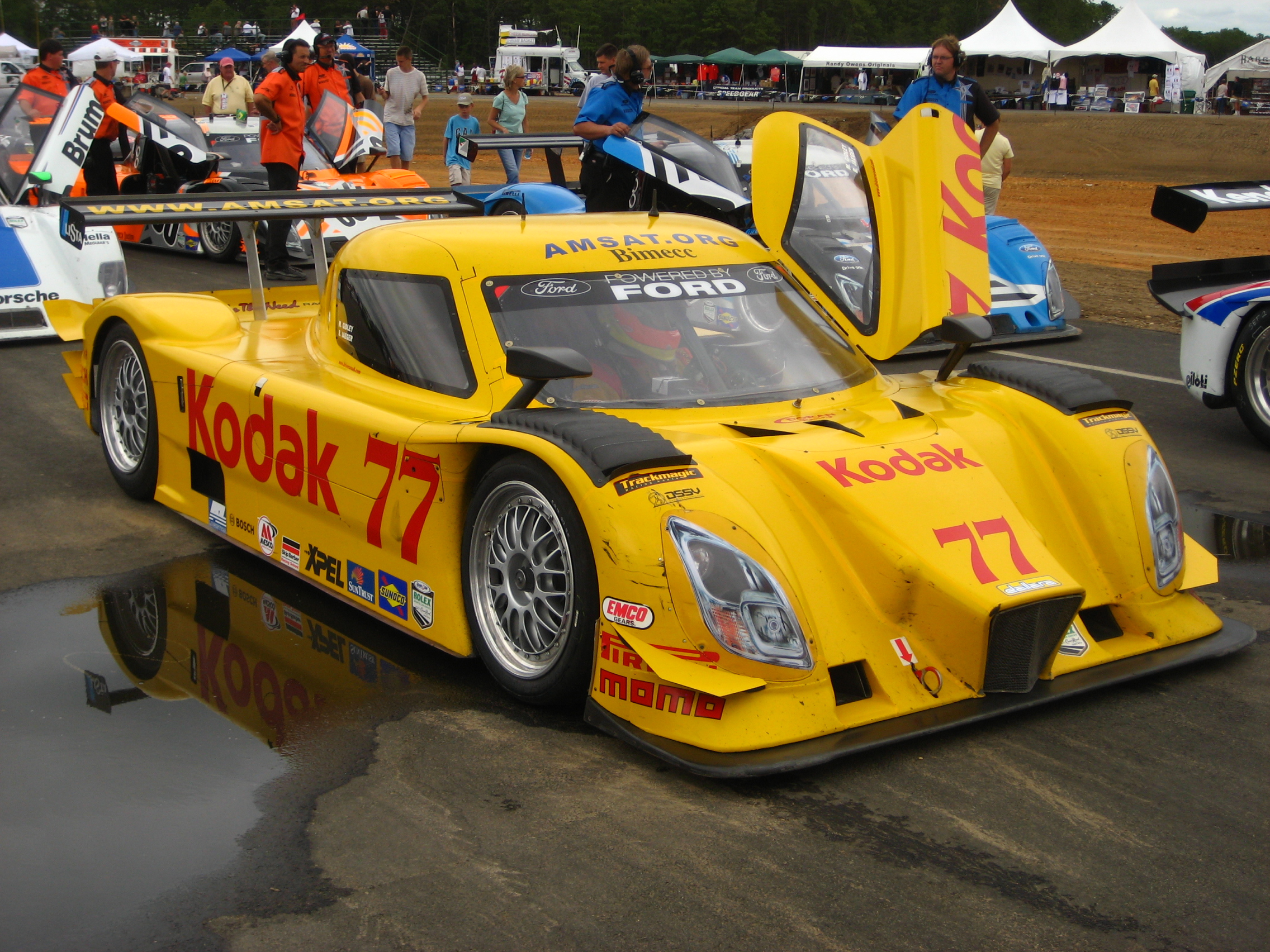
- Category: Daytona Prototype
- Constructor: Dallara

Technical specifications
- Chassis: Hybrid aluminum honeycomb & aluminum sheet over steel tube monocoque
- Suspension (front): Unequal A-arms w/pull-rod activated Ohlins shock absorbers & springs
- Suspension (rear): Unequal A-arms w/pull-rod activated Ohlins shock absorbers & springs
- Length: 4,445 mm (175.0 in)
- Width: 2,007 mm (79.0 in)
- Height: 1,222 mm (48.1 in)
- Wheelbase: 2,845 mm (112.0 in)
- Engine: Chevrolet / Ford / Pontiac / Ford 3,500–5,000 cc (3.5–5.0 L; 213.6–305.1 cu in) 24-valve to 32-valve, OHV/OHC/DOHC V6/V8, naturally-aspirated, mid-mounted
- Transmission: Emco 6-speed sequential
- Weight: 1,032 kg (2,275.2 lb)

Competition history
Races	Wins	Podiums	Poles
131	7	24	11

The Dallara DP01 is a second-generation Daytona Prototype race car, designed, developed and built by Italian manufacturer Dallara, for the Grand-Am Rolex Sports Car Series, in 2008. It was powered by a number of different engines, including Pontiac, Chevrolet, and Ford V8 engines, and even a Ford EcoBoost V6 engine.

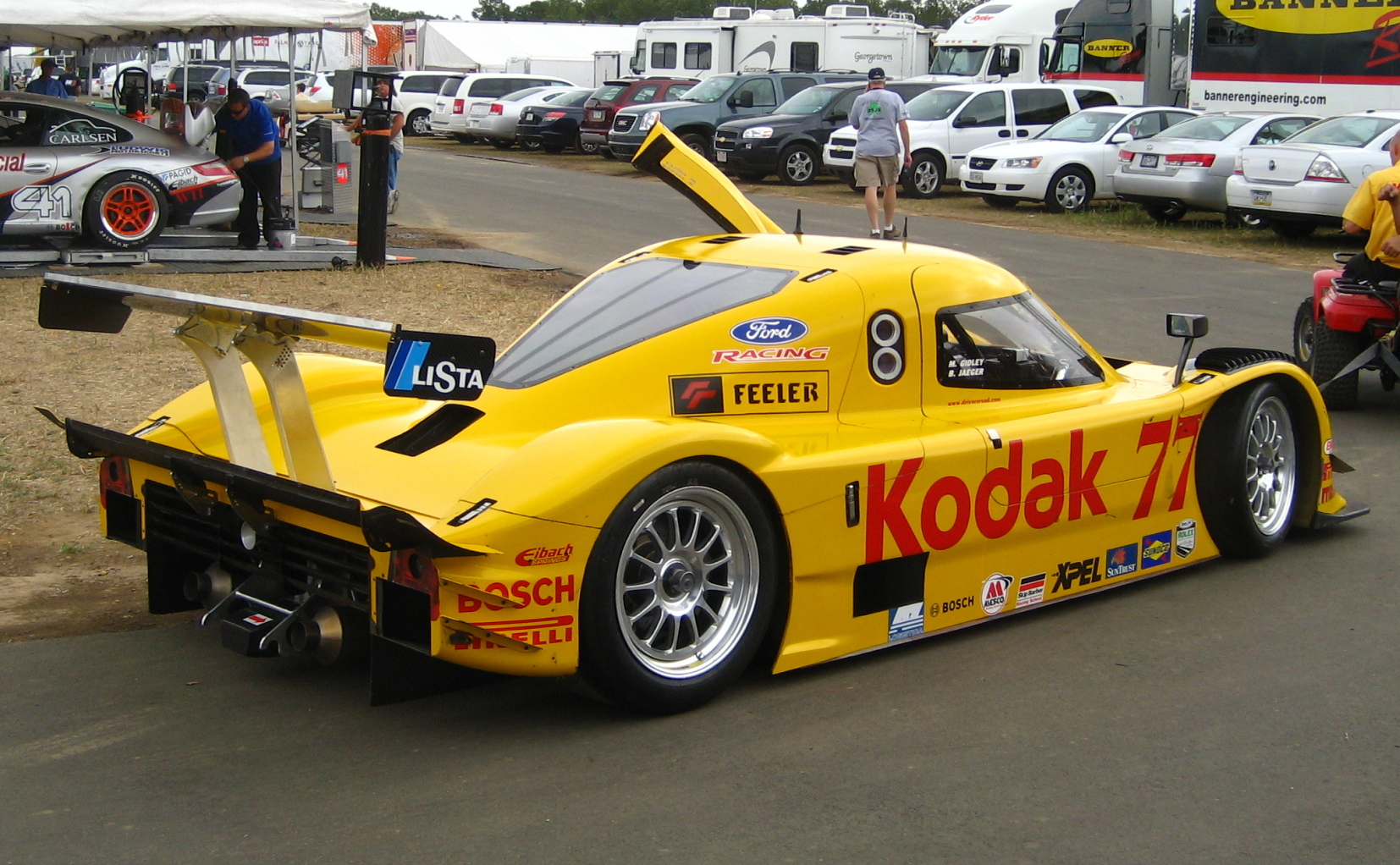
Dallara DP01 rear

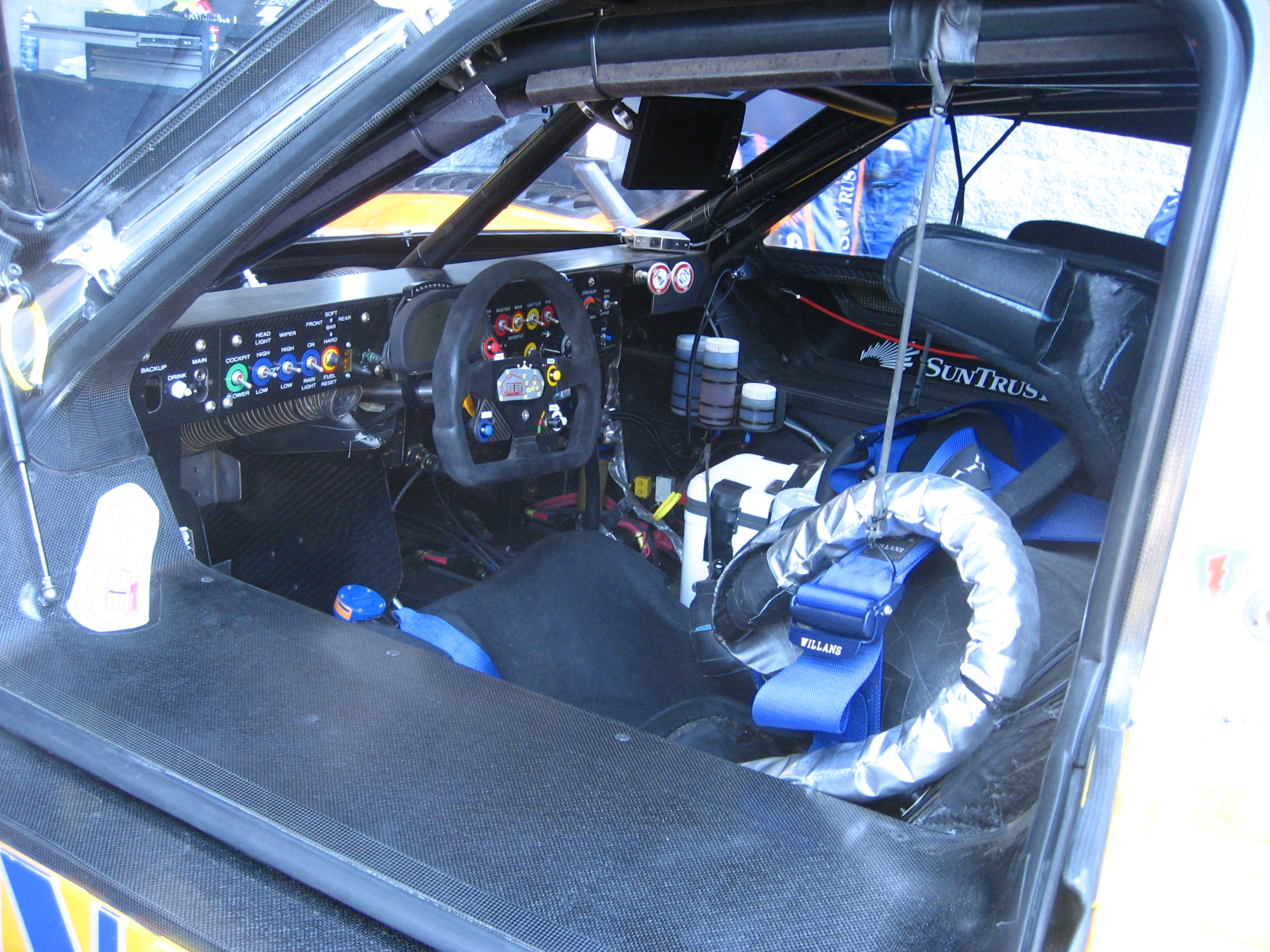
Cockpit of the DP01
