= Crawford Composites =

American manufacturer

- Trade name: Crawford Composites
- Company type: LLC
- Industry: Automotive industry Aerospace industry
- Predecessor: Max Crawford Motors, Ltd. (1972); Max Crawford Composites (1988); Crawford & Crawford Composites, Inc. (1996)
- Founded: 1998
- Founder: Max Crawford; Jan Crawford
- Headquarters: Denver, North Carolina, United States of America
- Number of employees: 30 (2018)
- Website: crawfordcomposites.com

Crawford Composites is an American manufacturer of carbon fiber and composite parts company based in Denver, North Carolina. Crawford designs and manufacture structural and non-structural composite components in industries such as aerospace, aviation, motor sports, health care, defense and structural construction.

== History ==
=== Max Crawford ===
Crawford Composites founder Max Crawford started as a racing driver and mechanic in the New Zealand Open Saloon Car Association racing series in his home country in 1966. Crawford moved to the USA to join Dick Barbour Racing as a mechanic in the IMSA GT Championship. After the disbandment of Dick Barbour Racing the New Zealander joined John Fitzpatrick Racing as a crew chief. After successes in Can-Am, Group C and a third place in the 1984 24 Hours of Le Mans, Crawford moved to North Carolina in 1987.

=== Mazda RX-792P ===
In 1991 Crawford was contracted by Mazda Motorsports to construct the chassis for the Mazda RX-792P. Lee Dykstra designed the car as Crawford Composites was contracted to manufacture the car. The car was designed to incorporate many style elements of the new Mazda RX-7. The chassis was a honeycomb aluminium monocoque. The GTP sports car was powered by a Mazda R26B Wankel engine. Two cars were built for Mazda Motorsports. The car encountered several problems in the IMSA GT Championship. During practice of the 1992 Grand Prix of Miami the #001 chassis caught fire. The fire was caused by the exhaust setting the bodywork on fire. Drivers Price Cobb and Pete Halsmer were unable to take part in the race. During the 1992 12 Hours of Sebring the car caught fire again. The two cars competed a total of 22 races in the 1992 IMSA GT Championship season. The cars scored two podium finishes, a third place at Lime Rock Park and a second place at Watkins Glen International Raceway. After a number of technical failures to finish the cars were retired after the season.

=== IRL ===
Crawford Composites was contracted by Riley & Scott to construct the chassis for their Indy Racing League program. The Crawford Composites constructed Riley & Scott Mk. V made its racing debut during the 1998 Indy 200 at Walt Disney World Speedway. Eliseo Salazar finished twelfth in the race. The best result was a sixth place achieved by Salazar at New Hampshire Motor Speedway. A total of eight Mk. V chassis were constructed.

=== Sport prototypes ===
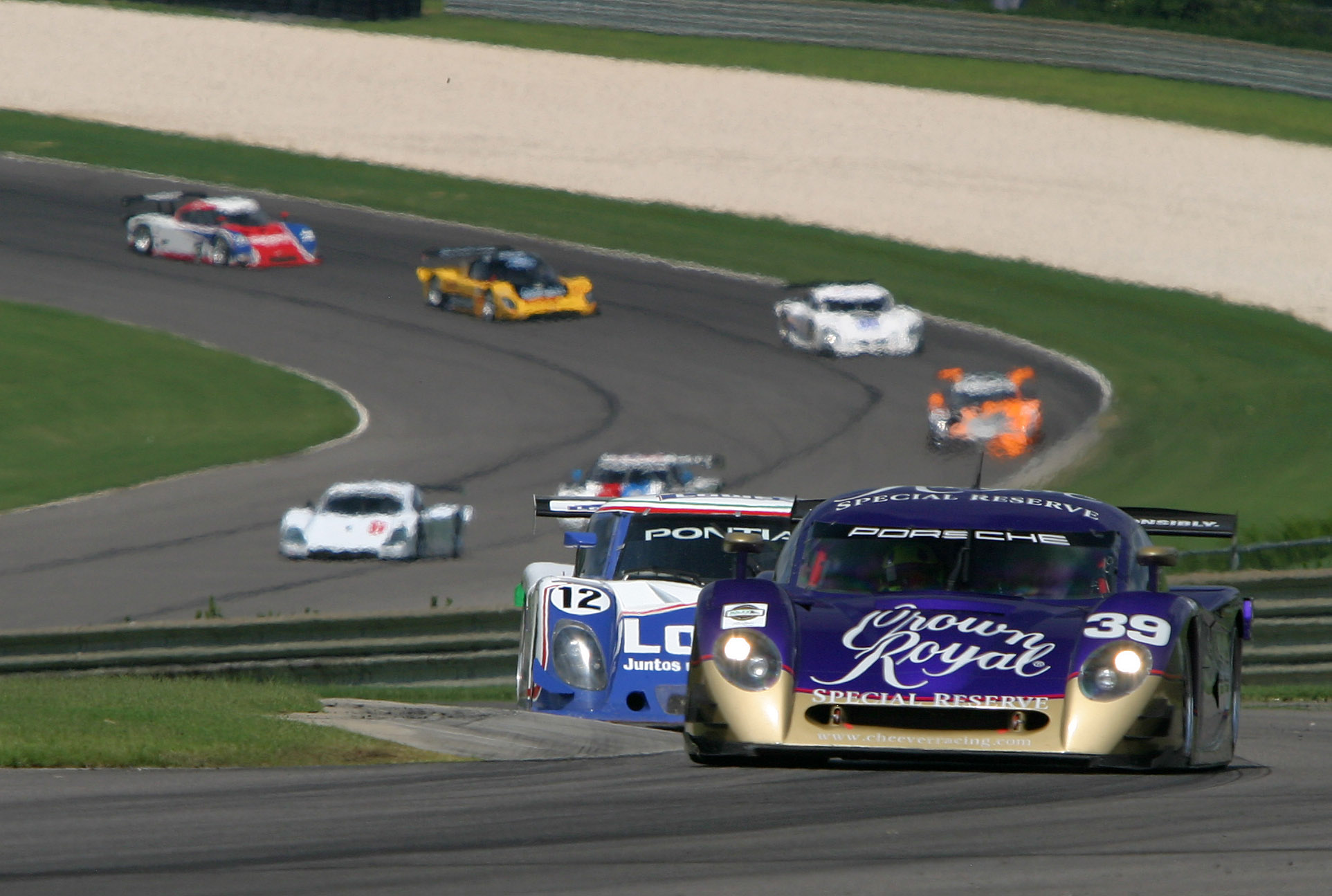

For the 2001 Grand American Road Racing Championship season Crawford designed and built the Crawford SSC2K. The car was designed by Andy Scriven who joined Crawford in April 1999 after leaving Lola. The GTP sports car was powered by a Judd V10 engine. The car was built for Kevin Doran's racing team, Doran Racing. During the two years the car was contested the car was fitted with various different front end designs. The blunt nose suffered similar issues as experienced by the Reynard 2KQ, the airflow towards the rear end was disrupted. By 2002 the Crawford followed Lola B2K/10's example with regard to the aerodynamic design. In the cars second season the car scored its first win. At Virginia International Raceway Andy Wallace and Chris Dyson won the 500 km race.

In 2003 the Rolex Sports Car Series introduced the Daytona Prototype class. Crawford was one of seven original Daytona Prototype constructors. The Crawford DP03 debuted in the 2004 Rolex Sports Car Series season. Three DP03's entered pre-season testing at Daytona International Speedway. The Howard-Boss Motorsports entry driven by Dale Earnhardt Jr., Tony Stewart and Andy Wallace was the fastest Crawford fourth overall. The team finished fifth in the 2004 24 Hours of Daytona. The DP03's won three races during the season. The DP03 won eleven races between 2003 and 2008. A total of eleven DP03's were built. After the 2008 season the second generation of Daytona Prototypes was presented. The DP08 was less successful than its predecessor. The cars best finish was an eighth place at the 2009 24 Hours of Daytona. Crawford did not design a third generation Daytona Prototype.

=== Grand-Am GT ===
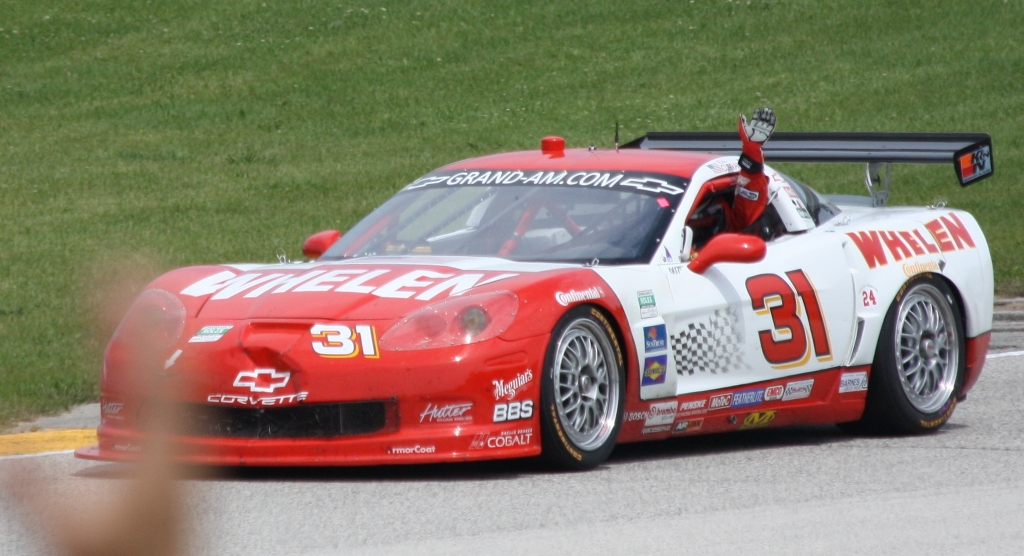

Chief designer Andy Scriven designed the Crawford GT06 chassis to compete in the Rolex Sports Car Series GT category. The GT06 project originally began after Crawford was approached to build a Ford Mustang GT for Blackforest Motorsports. The chassis was designed to accommodate a wide range of wheelbases and drivetrains for various manufacturers. The GT06 chassis made its debut in the 2007 Rolex Sports Car Series season. The GT06 had a tough opening season with Porsche's dominating the season. With Pontiac joining the title fight the Crawford struggled. Due to a lack of results more teams switched to the more successful marques.

=== Formula racecars ===
Crawford Composites first attempt at formula racing came in 2014. In conjunction with High Performance Group, the constructed announced the creation of the Formula Lites. The series is planned to run a full schedule in 2015 sanctioned by SCCA Pro Racing. The Crawford FL15 has a carbon fiber monocoque chassis built according to FIA F3 technical regulations. The car would initially be powered by a 2L Volkswagen engine. Later it was announced the car will feature a Honda power plant. The 2.4 L Honda K24 engine will be built by Honda Performance Development. The racing class was announced with the unveiling of the car at the North American Motorsports Expo. The FL15 made its debut at Virginia International Raceway with Dane Cameron behind the wheel. Cameron ran two exhibition sessions during the 2014 Ultimate Track Car Challenge.

In 2016, the Crawford F4 was launched for the Formula 4 United States Championship. It features a 2000cc Honda K20C naturally aspirated engine, detuned to 160 hp.

In 2018, the Ligier Crawford JS F3 will debut at Formula 3 Americas Championship. It will have a 270 hp turbocharged version of the Honda K20C engine.

== Cars ==
Year	Car	Class	Notes
1992	Mazda RX-792P	IMSA GT GTP	
1998	Riley & Scott Mk. V	IndyCar Series	Chassis construction only
2000	Crawford SSC2K	Sports Racing Prototype	
2004	Crawford DP03	Daytona Prototype	
2006	Crawford GT06	Grand-Am GT	Chassis for Infiniti G35, Corvette Z06, Ford Mustang GT and the Ferrari F430
2008	Crawford DP08	Daytona Prototype	
2010	Star Pro	Star Mazda	
2014	Crawford FL15	Formula Lites	
2016	Crawford F4-16	United States Formula 4 Championship	
2018	Ligier JS F3	FR Americas	
