= Daytona Prototype =

Prototype racing car

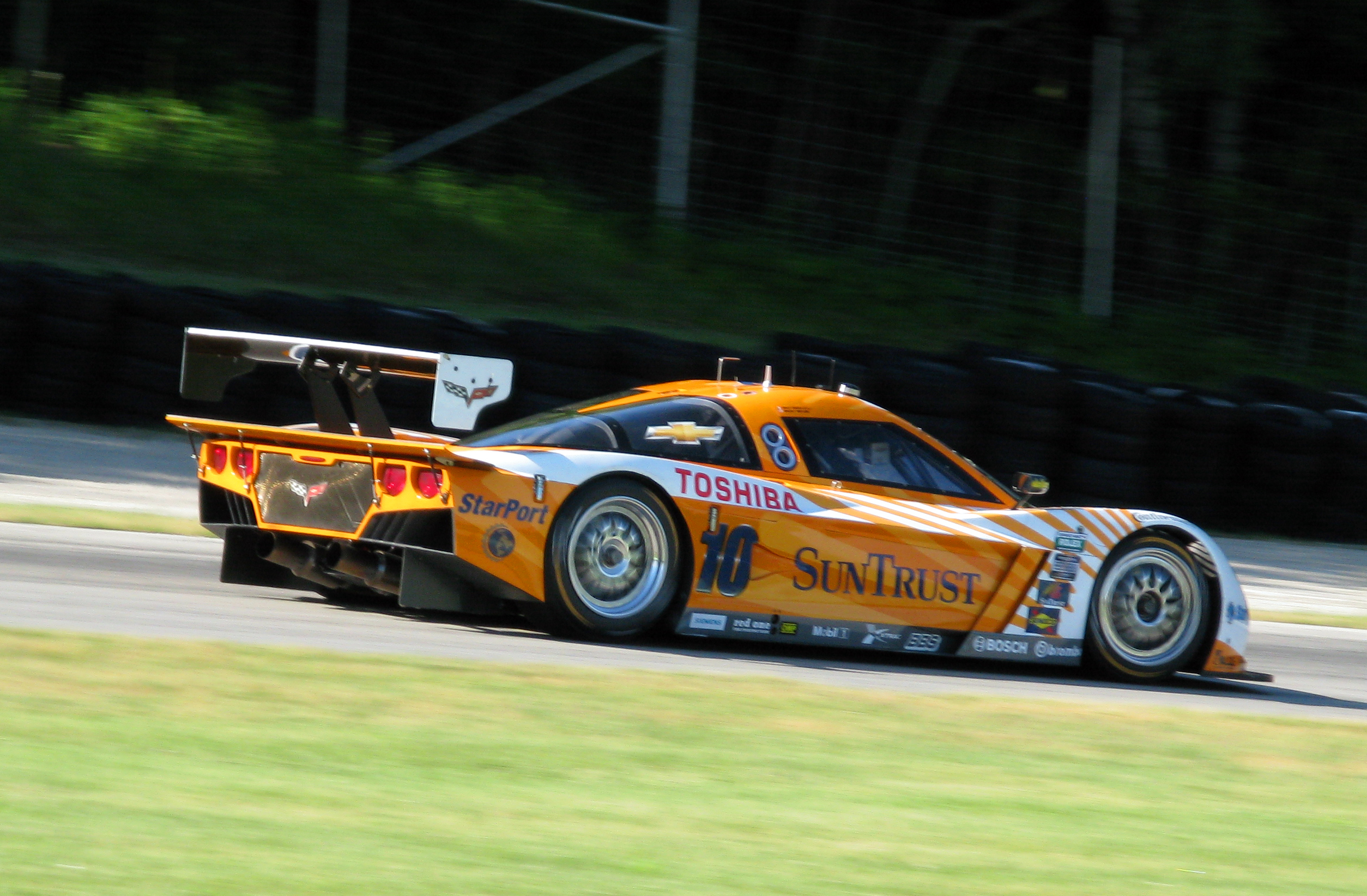
A Daytona Prototype from 2012

A Daytona Prototype was a type of sports prototype racing car developed specifically for the Grand American Road Racing Association's Rolex Sports Car Series as their top class of car, which replaced their main prototype racing class, specifically Le Mans Prototypes (LMPs). The cars later competed in the merged series of the IMSA SportsCar Championship, from 2014 to 2016, before being phased out and replaced by the Daytona Prototype International class in 2017. They are named after the main series event, the Rolex 24 at Daytona.

== Development ==
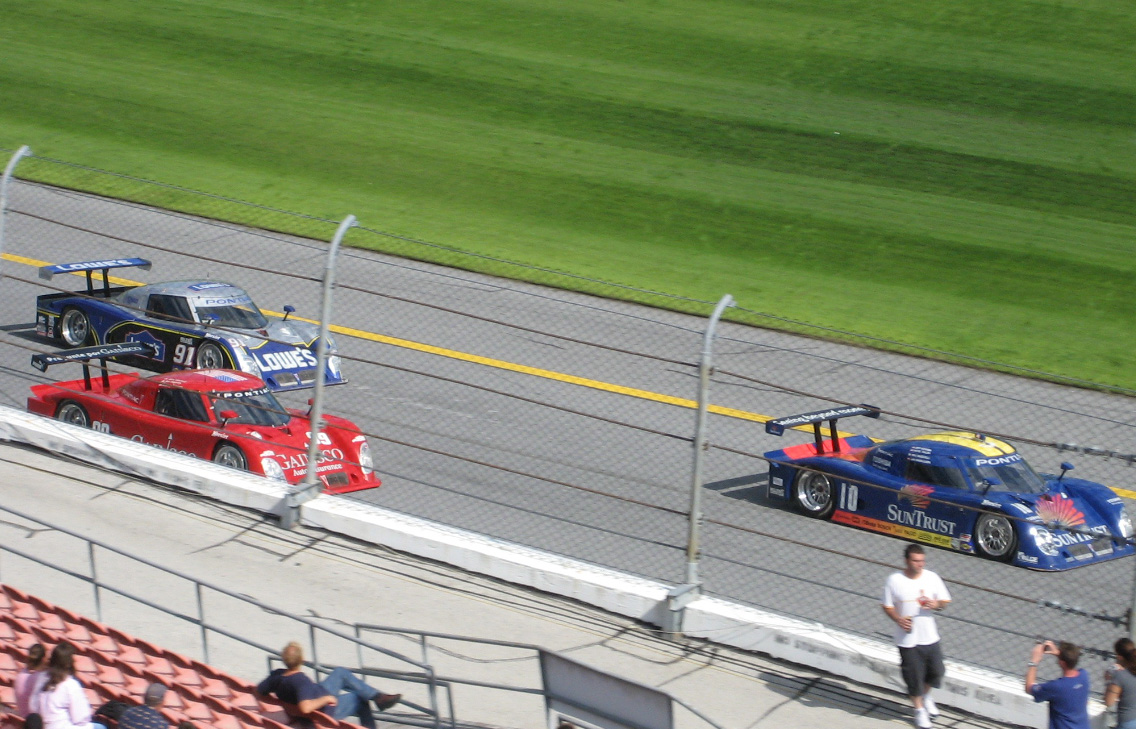
Daytona Prototypes competing at the 2007 24 Hours of Daytona

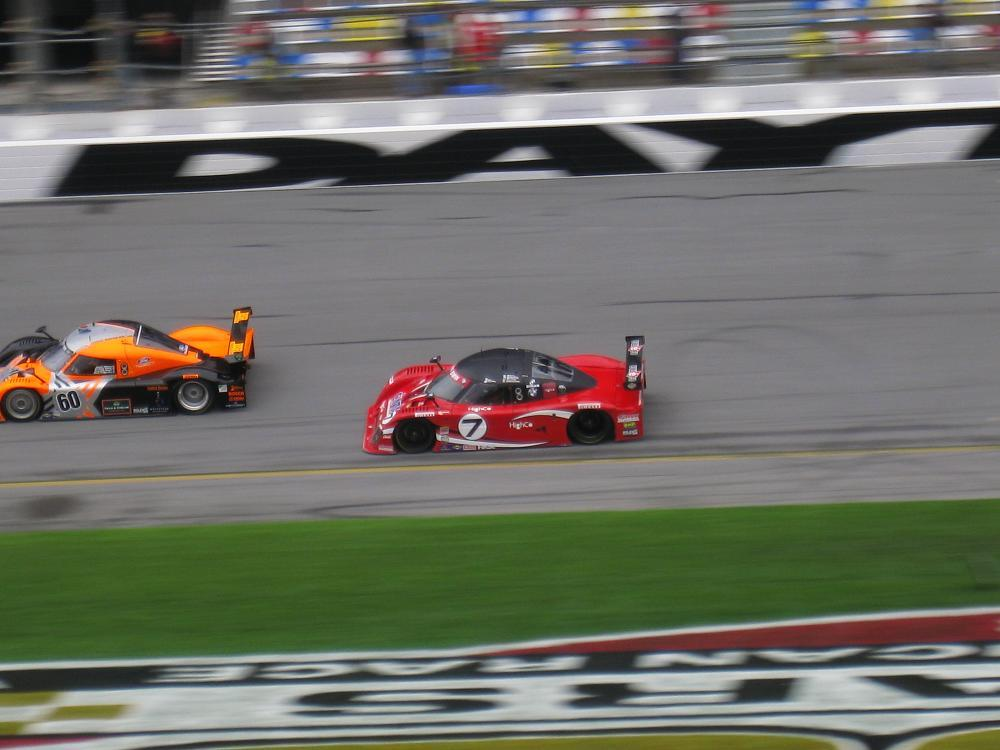
Daytona Prototypes competing at the 2008 24 Hours of Daytona

For the 2003 Rolex Sports Car Series season, the Grand American Road Racing Association (GARRA) announced that they would stop support of their two premier open cockpit classes, known as SRP-I and SRP-II. These cars, mostly modified from Le Mans Prototypes, were technologically advanced and could reach high speeds, specifically on the Mulsanne Straight at the 24 Hours of Le Mans. However, these same speeds were found to be extremely dangerous at GARRA's premier track, the Daytona International Speedway. The concrete walls of the oval section of the road course that the series runs were dangerous enough on their own, but were also on the parts of the track where cars reached their highest speed. Therefore, GARRA decided that they would need to slow down their competitors in order to make their racing series safer.

At the same time, due to the technological advancement of Le Mans Prototypes, GARRA decided that they would also lower the overall cost of their prototypes. To do this, they would use closed cockpit chassis made of tube frames, instead of high cost carbon fiber composites. They would also standardize the amount of technology that could go into a car, as well as not allowing teams to develop their cars over a season, instead being forced to stay with the same basic car. This would stop teams from having to spend money on aerodynamic tweaks and technological experimentation, as well as private track testing. To further restrict cost, the series would regulate who could provide chassis and who could provide engines, thus preventing teams from trying a unique chassis or engine that may end up being a failure. Engines specifically would have to be based on a road-legal production unit from a major manufacturer. At the same time, major manufacturers would not be allowed to run Daytona Prototype teams, in order to help keep competition level and costs down.

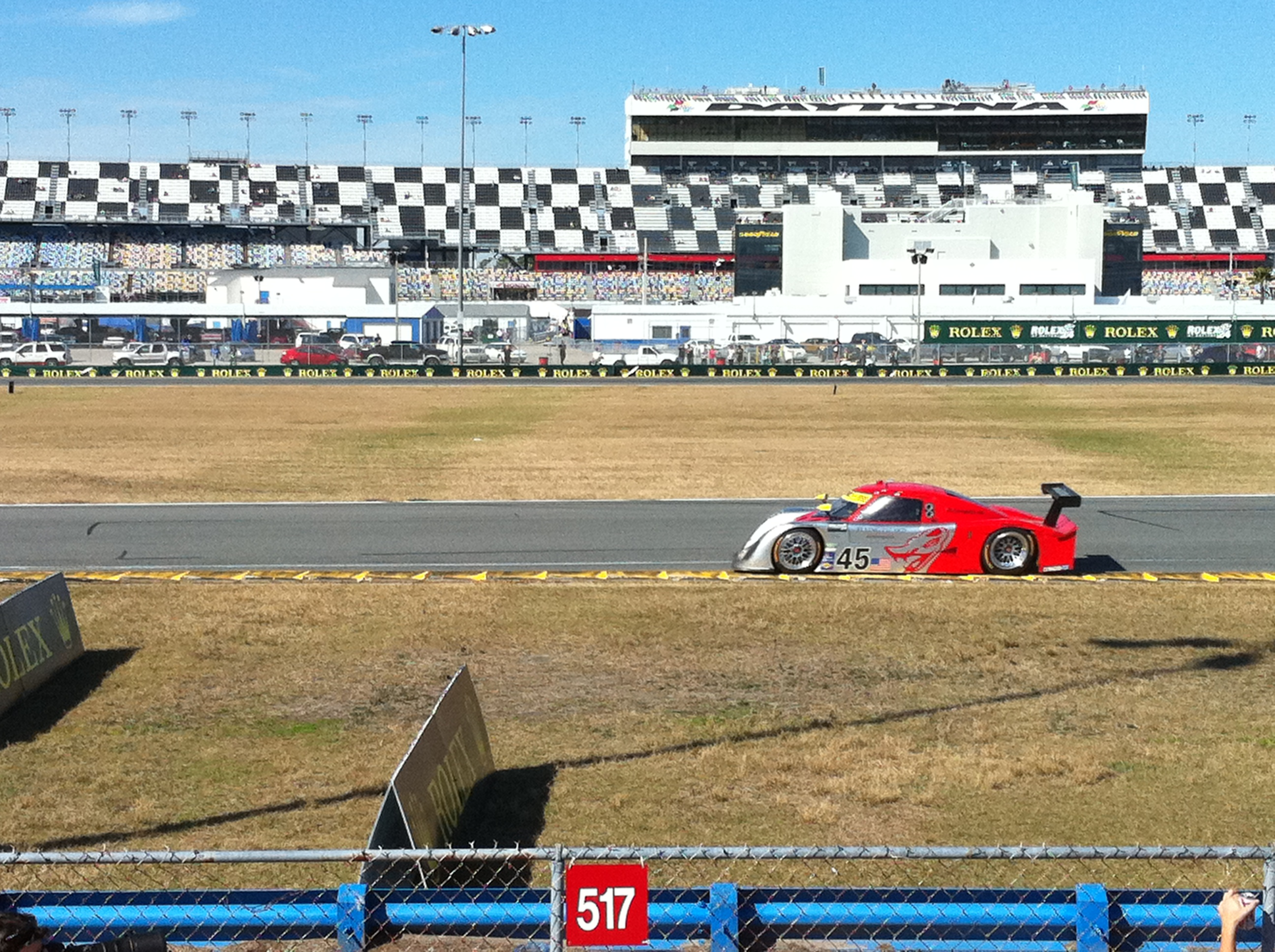
Flying Lizard Motorsports Daytona Prototype at the 2011 24 Hours of Daytona

Combining the low cost elements with the speed and safety elements, the designs for Daytona Prototypes were laid down, with constructors having freedom to develop a car however they wished so long as it fit within the smaller dimensions of a Daytona Prototype over a Le Mans Prototype. These smaller dimensions, especially in length, helped to create a more blunt front end to the car that would slow the cars down, regardless of how much a constructor put into sculpting the design.

== Chassis ==
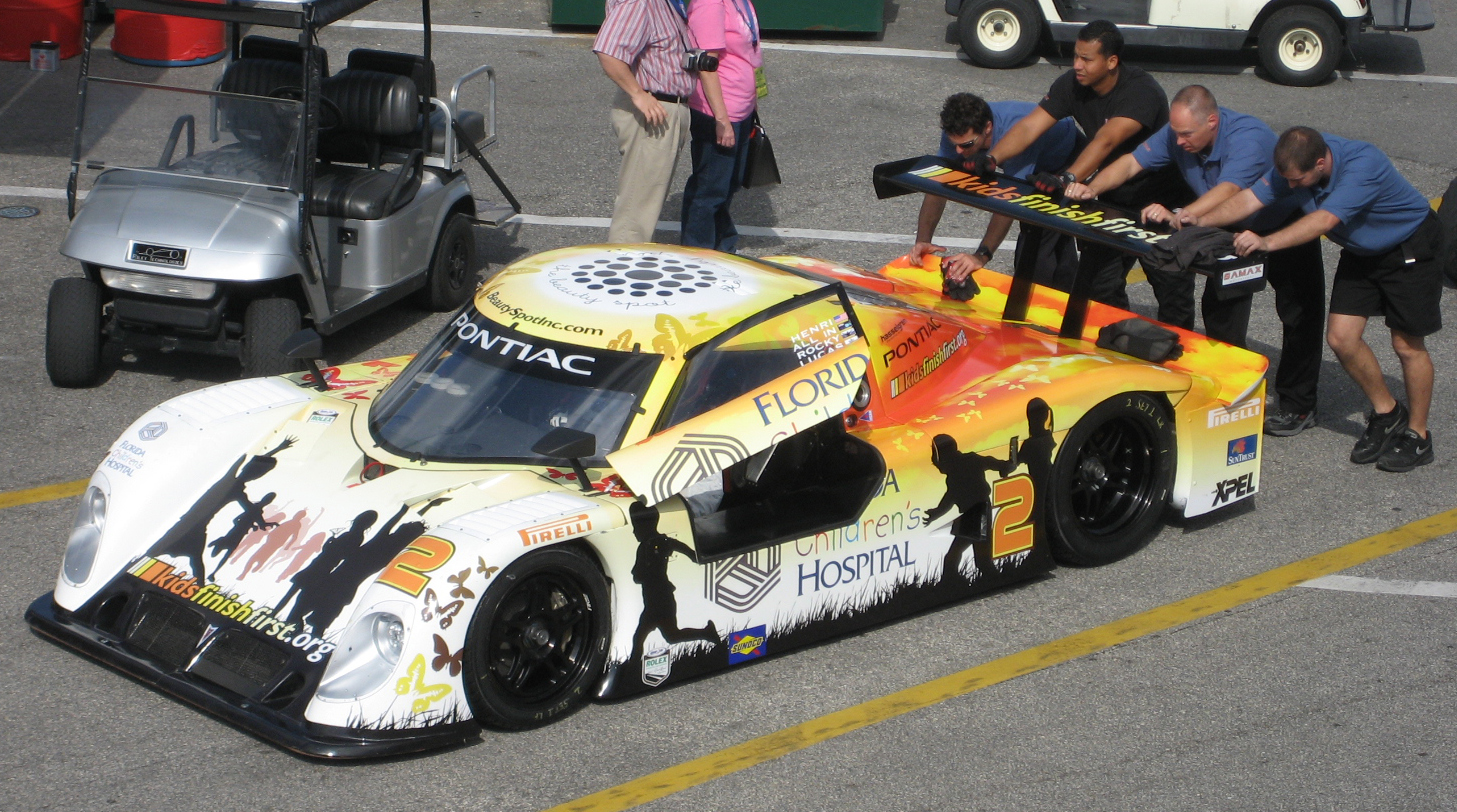
A Riley MkXI run by Samax Motorsport

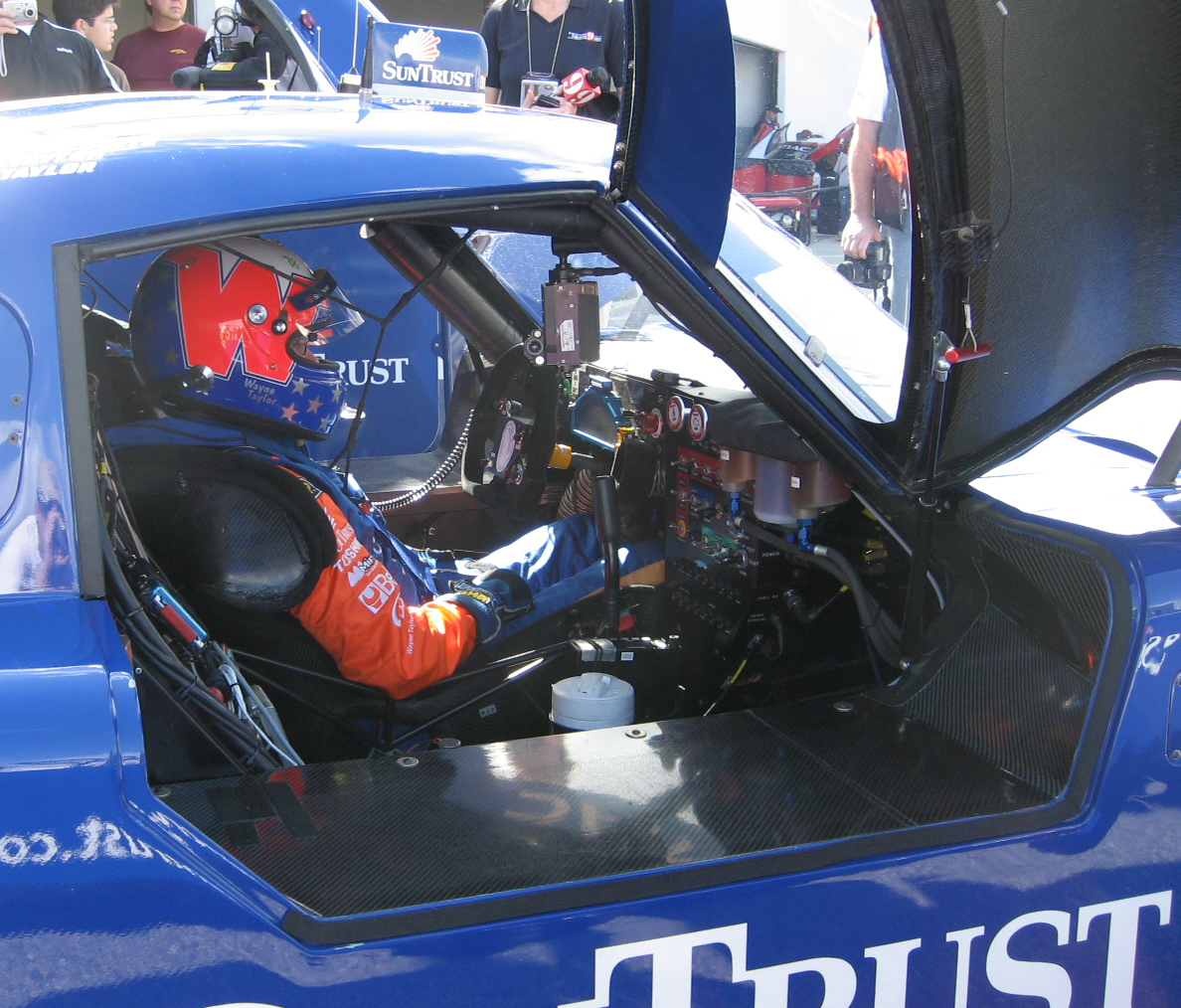
Driver Wayne Taylor sitting in the cockpit of his Daytona Prototype

In order to help regulate the field and to help keep it level, GARRA only allows a certain number of chassis to be used. At the same time, each approved chassis is allowed to participate for a period of five years before GARRA reselects their approved chassis. Each chassis fits within GARRA's regulations in regards to dimension, but each approved chassis is uniquely different in design.

=== DP Gen1 (2003) ===
From 2003 to 2007 seven manufacturers had their chassis approved by GARRA:

- Chase CCE
- Crawford DP03
- Doran JE4
- Fabcar FDSC/03
- Multimatic MDP1 (sometimes badged as the Multimatic Ford Focus)
- Picchio DP2
- Riley MkXI

=== DP Gen2 (2008) ===
For 2008, new chassis designs were allowed to be submitted, with several companies purchasing the rights from existing entries. Lola Racing Cars, in association with Krohn Racing, purchased Multimatic's entry for the construction of a new prototype under the name Proto-Auto. Dallara later purchased Doran's entry as well, with assistance from SunTrust Racing.. Cheever Racing purchased Fabcar's license and developed under the Coyote name, with assistance from former manufacturer Picchio.

The new chassis available from 2008 onward were:

- Crawford DP08
- Coyote CC/08
- Dallara DP01
- Fabcar Spirit of Daytona Prototype
- Proto-Auto Lola B08/70
- Riley MkXX
- Sabre RD1 (unraced)

GARRA allows for modifications to the bodywork of each Daytona Prototype only in certain areas, most specifically to the rear wing and Gurney flap as well as front dive planes.

=== DP Gen3 (2012) ===
Various changes have been made to the Daytona Prototypes for the 2012 season:

- The greenhouse (cockpit) area became nearly identical for all newly constructed cars, but featuring a one-inch zone throughout the greenhouse surface to allow for individual styling cues, including windshield implementation and window outlines.
- New minimum body cross-section provisions gave the new DPs a more upright front fascia and nose, rather than the more sloped layout of previous generations cars. This allowed manufacturers to add more design character to their cars, making them closer to their production cars while still offering the dramatic message embodied by a prototype
- Flexibility has also been introduced into the rules for side bodywork, including production-derived sidepods and open vents behind the front wheels that enable styling elements from street cars to be functional on the race cars.

These changes notwithstanding, the basic chassis structure below the greenhouse remains the same, including suspension details, engine installation, bellhousing, gearbox, electronics, fueling and safety systems.

Gen2 cars could be updated to Gen3 specifications.

The Gen3 cars are:

- Riley MkXXVI
- Corvette DP (Corvette bodykit applied either to Riley, Coyote or Dallara chassis)

=== List of Daytona Prototypes ===
Manufacturer	Chassis	Image	Debut	Applications
Chevrolet	Corvette DP		2012	3rd Generation
Coyote	CC/08		2008	2nd Generation
Coyote	CC/09		2009	2nd Generation
Crawford	DP03		2003	1st Generation
Crawford	DP08		2008	2nd Generation
Dallara	DP01		2008	2nd Generation
Doran	JE4		2003	1st Generation
Fabcar	FDSC/03		2003	1st Generation
Fabcar	Spirit of Daytona Prototype		2008	2nd Generation
Lola	B08/70		2008	2nd Generation
Multimatic	MDP1		2003	1st Generation
Picchio	DP2		2003	1st Generation
Riley	Mk XI		2003	1st Generation
Riley	Mk XX		2008	2nd Generation
Riley	Mk XXVI		2012	3rd Generation

== Engine ==
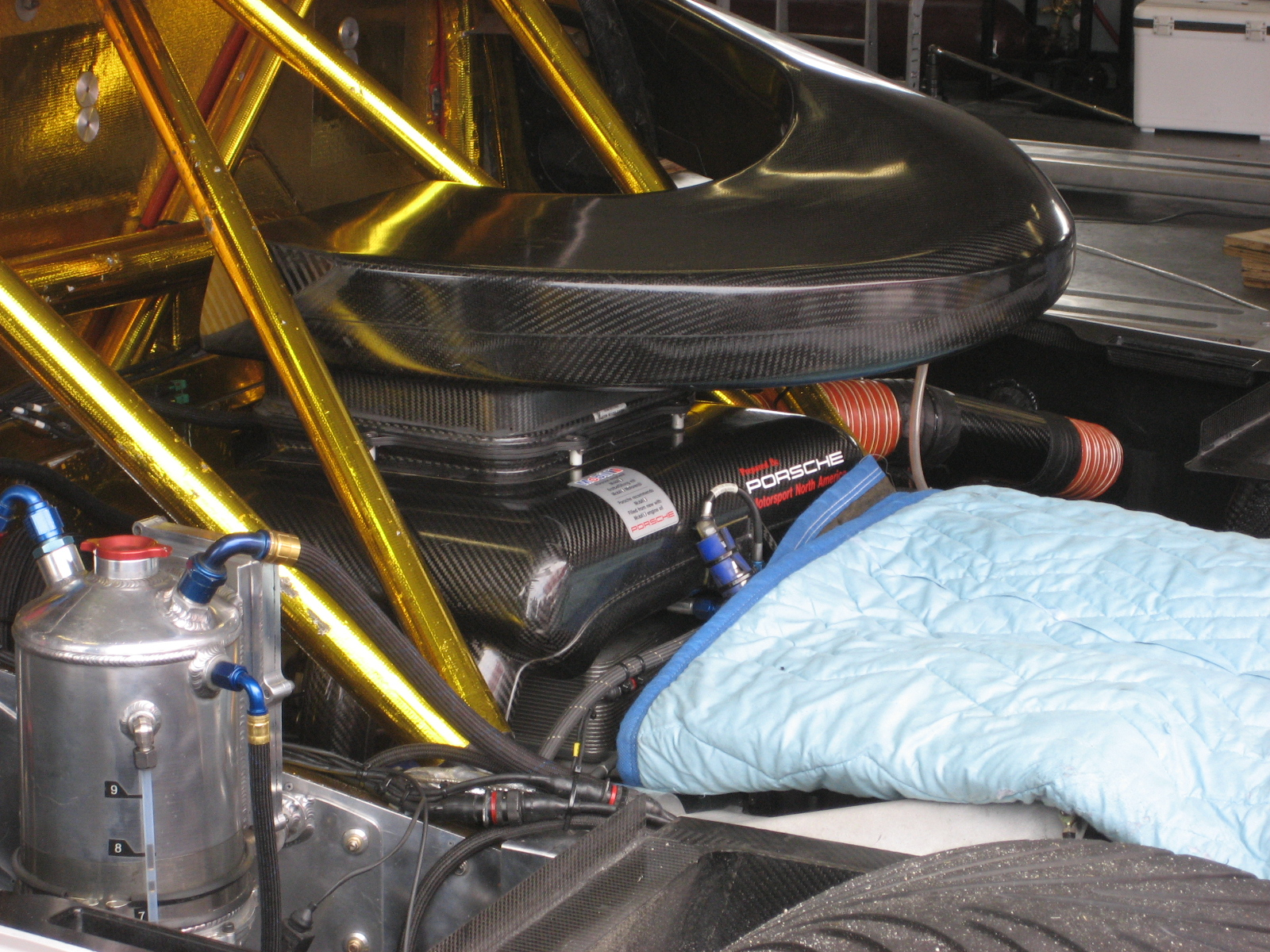
A Porsche engine installed in a Daytona Prototype

As well as the chassis, the engines used are also standardized and regulated. Unlike chassis, engines must come from a major production car manufacturer, using the block from an engine used on a production car. However, these engines can have their displacements modified in order to equalize the field. For 2007, all engines will also be required to use standardized ECUs in order to better regulate engine performance.

The following engines are currently approved by GARRA:

- BMW 5.0 L V8
- BMW 4.5 L V8
- Ford 5.0 L V8
- Ford 3.5 L Twin Turbo V6
- Infiniti 4.35 L V8
- Lexus 5.0 L V8 (can also be branded as Toyota)
- Porsche 3.99 L Flat-6
- Porsche 5.0 L V8 (approved in late 2007)
- Pontiac 5.0 L V8 (can also be branded as Chevrolet or Cadillac)
- Honda 3.9 L V6
- Honda 3.5 L V6

Each engine also has specific restrictions on what can be modified beyond stock parts, as well as restrictions on intake and exhaust dimensions, RPM, and various technical details.

During the 2007 season, a second Porsche engine was approved by Grand Am. The 5.0L V8 unit is not actually constructed by Porsche, but is based on the V8 engine used in the Porsche Cayenne, built by Lozano Bros. Porting.

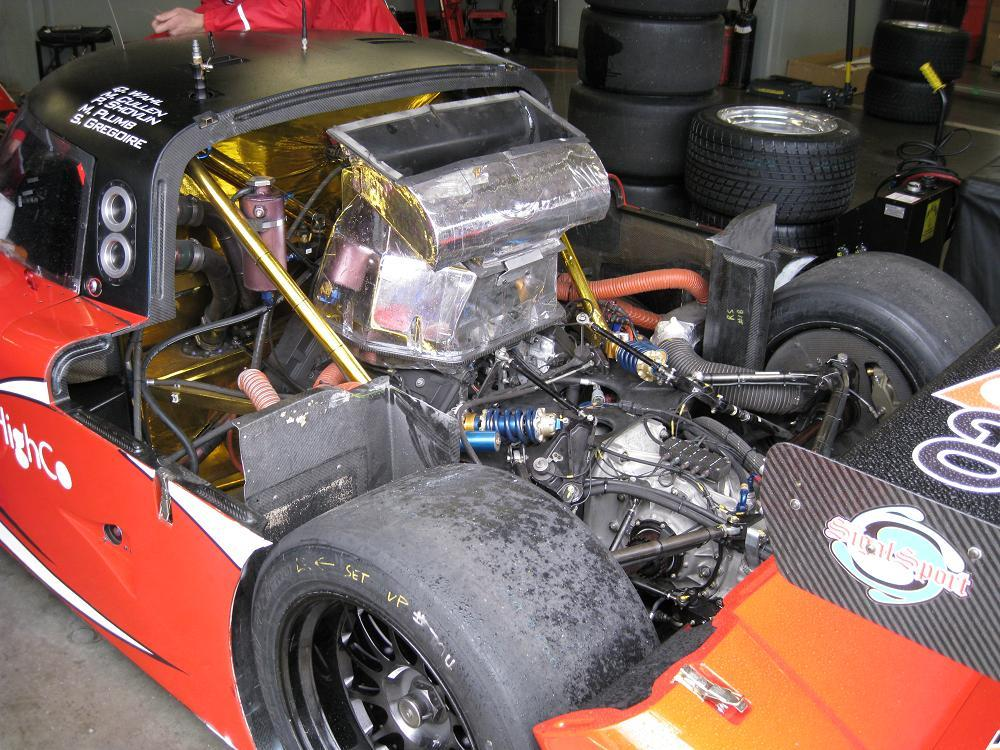
A Dinan-prepared BMW V8.

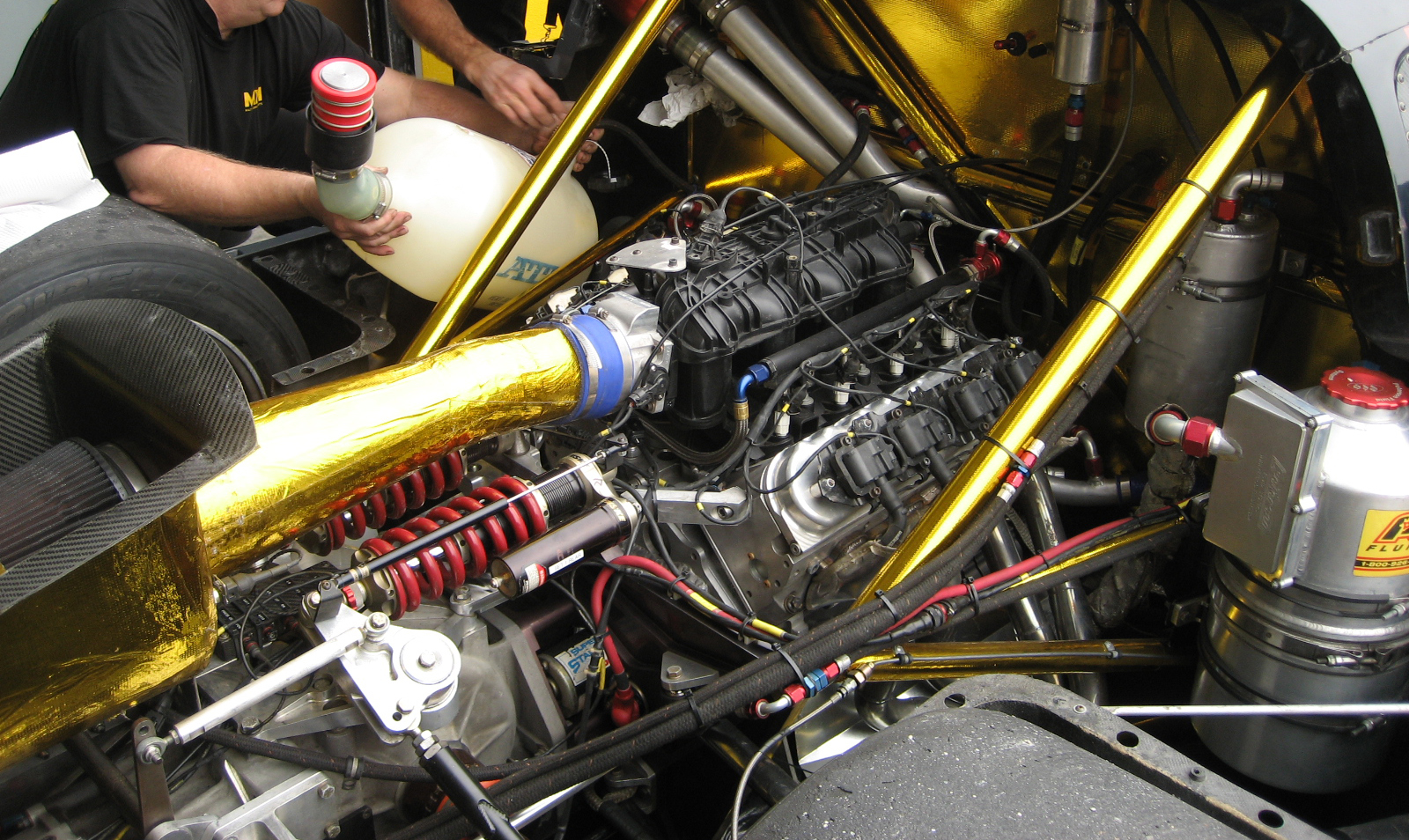
A Pontiac V8.

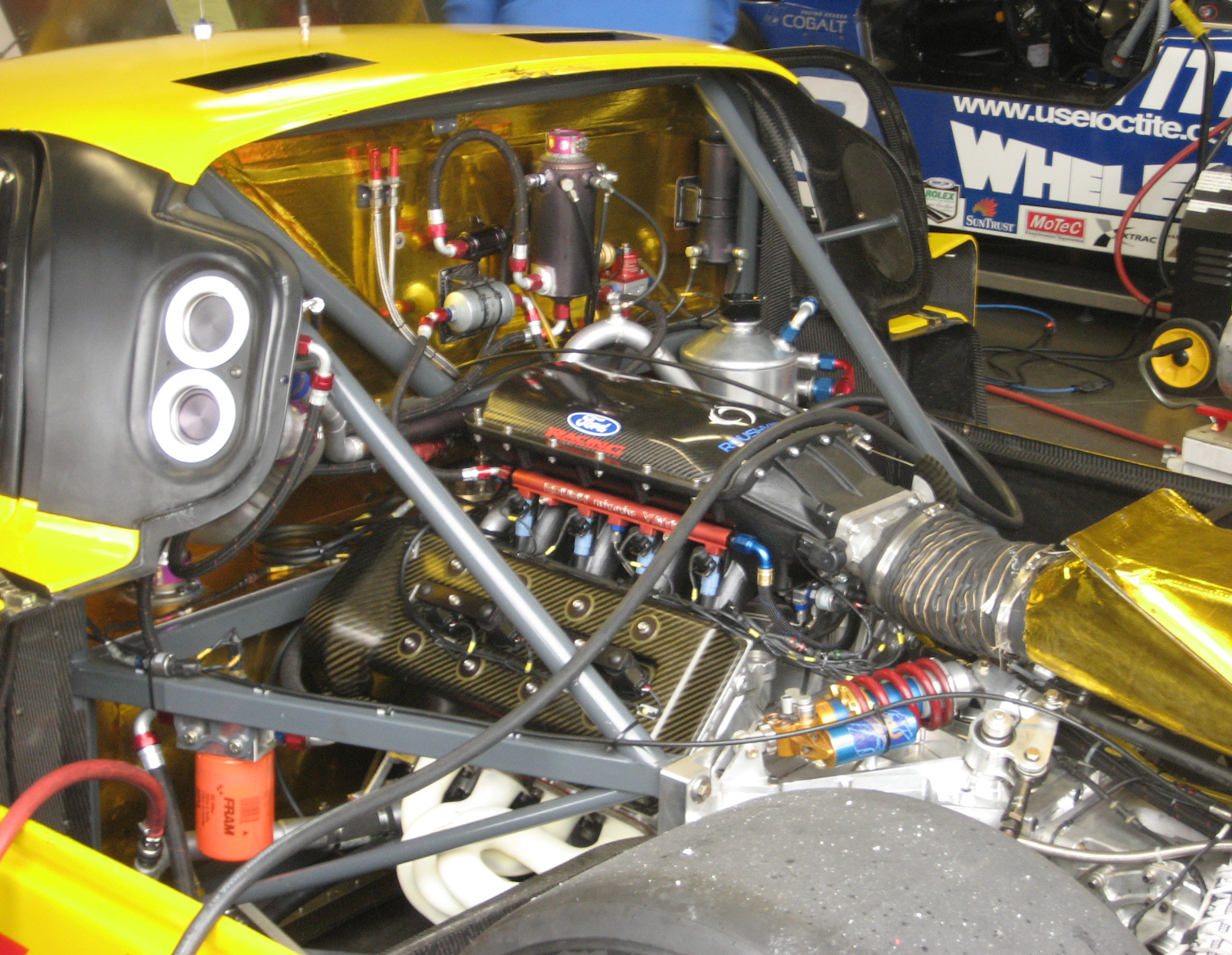
A Roush/Yates-prepared Ford V8.

== Specifications ==
(as of 2014 IMSA TUDOR United SportsCar Championship rules for DP-based prototypes)

- Engine displacement: 5.5 L Maximum for Normally aspirated, 3.5 for forced induction, 2.5 liters for diesel engines
- Transmission: 2014 and later: 6 speed sequential manual transmission - 2013 and earlier: Above 4.5 L (275 in^{3}) - 5 forward gears (maximum)
  4.5 L (275 in^{3}) displacement and below - 6 forward gears (maximum) manual or sequential manual transmission paddle shift allowed
- Weight: 4.0 L (244 in^{3}) displacement and above-2,275 lb (1,032 kg)
  Below 4.0 L (244 in^{3})-2,225 lb (1,010 kg)
- Power Output: 2014 and later 550–600 hp - 2013 and earlier: 500 hp (370kW)
- Fuel: 100 octane unleaded gasoline
- Fuel capacity: 24 U.S. gallons (91 liters)
- Fuel delivery: Fuel injection
- Aspiration: Naturally aspirated or Turbo charged engine
- Steering: Power, rack and pinion

== History ==
Debuting in the 2003 season, specifically at the Rolex 24 at Daytona, six Daytona Prototypes initially ran: A Fabcar-Toyota, a Picchio-BMW, a Doran-Chevrolet, two Fabcar-Porsches, and a Multimatic-Ford. A second Multimatic-Ford was planned to race, but it never appeared. In qualifying, a Chevrolet Corvette and a Ford Mustang, both from the GTS class, set the fastest two lap times, while the leading Daytona Prototype was the Multimatic-Ford. Grand-Am however reserved "the first three rows of the grid for the Daytona Prototypes, regardless of their qualifying times," to ensure the Daytona Prototypes started at the front of the field. The Daytona Prototypes also failed to even take the overall pole position from heavily restricted SRP prototypes. In the race itself, only two DPs managed to finish, far behind a much lower Grand Touring class car. However, after the teething problems were worked out, the cars began to take overall victories as the season progressed.

For 2004, the SRP cars were finally banned, and the number of DPs grew, with 17 appearing at the season opener at Daytona where they managed to take the overall win. By 2006, thanks to the low cost of the design, the number of DPs at some races grew to above thirty entrants, allowing for full fields and close racing. GARRA planned to continue using the Daytona Prototype in the foreseeable future, with new chassis designs being allowed into the series in 2008.

Between 2006 and 2012, DP cars were permitted to compete in Japan's Super GT in the secondary GT300 class with outstanding results, one entrant, the Mooncraft Shiden lost out to an RE Amemiya RX-7 (although tied for points) in the drivers' title and again to a MR-S, but took the team title in 2007.

In 2012, Grand-Am released the next generation Daytona Prototypes. Some of these include the new Corvette Daytona Prototype which also marks Chevrolet's return to the DP class and other manufacturers already in the series changed to multiple chassis designs from the chassis producers.

Since 2014, when the Rolex Sports Car Series merged with the American Le Mans Series, Daytona Prototypes were being raced alongside the LMP2 prototypes from the ALMS as the main prototype class until 2016. During these years DP had performance comparable to LMP2 in some venues. At the 2014 Indianapolis Motor Speedway Grand Prix Circuit they lapped under 1.20 with Chevrolet and Ford engines.

=== Daytona Prototype International ===
From 2017 forward, a new generation of Daytona Prototypes, branded Daytona Prototype International (DPi), has been replacing the original tube-framed Daytona Prototypes. These new prototypes will be based on the four ACO homologated LMP2 chassis made by Dallara, Onroak (Ligier), Oreca, and Riley-Multimatic, with brand specific bodywork and homologated engines. Manufacturers are asked to partner with a privateer team, and each car will sport manufacturer bodywork, corresponding to their brand-identity. These rules are made to both control costs and attract manufacturers to the series.

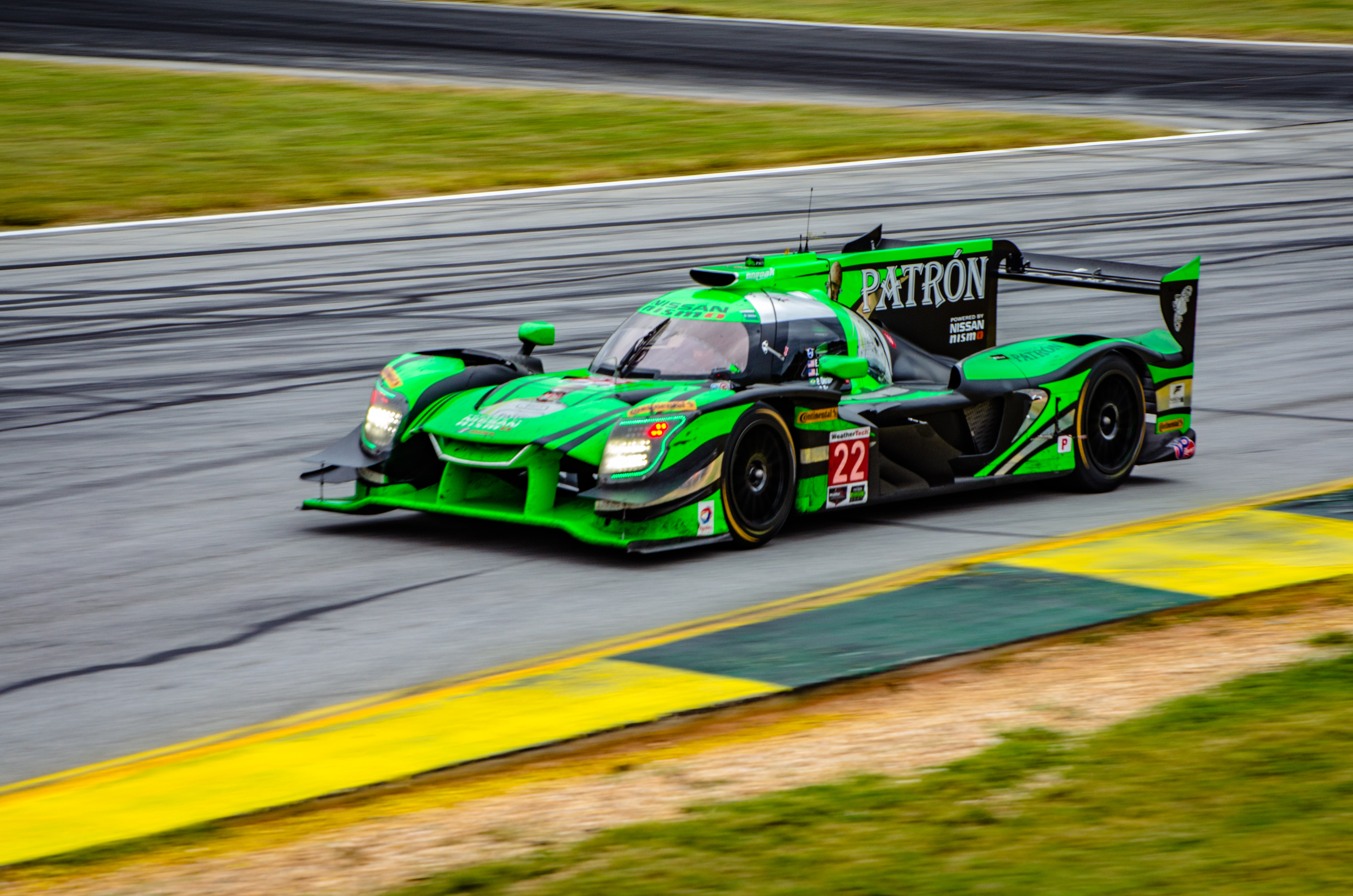
Nissan Onroak DPi at Petit Le Mans.

These cars compete in the Prototype class, along with ACO-FIA spec LMP2 cars, which feature chassis from the same four manufacturers and a spec Gibson V8 engine. Originally, the hope was for DPi cars to be Le Mans eligible in the LMP2 class, but disagreements between the ACO and IMSA did not allow this to come to fruition.
