= Fabcar FDSC/03 =

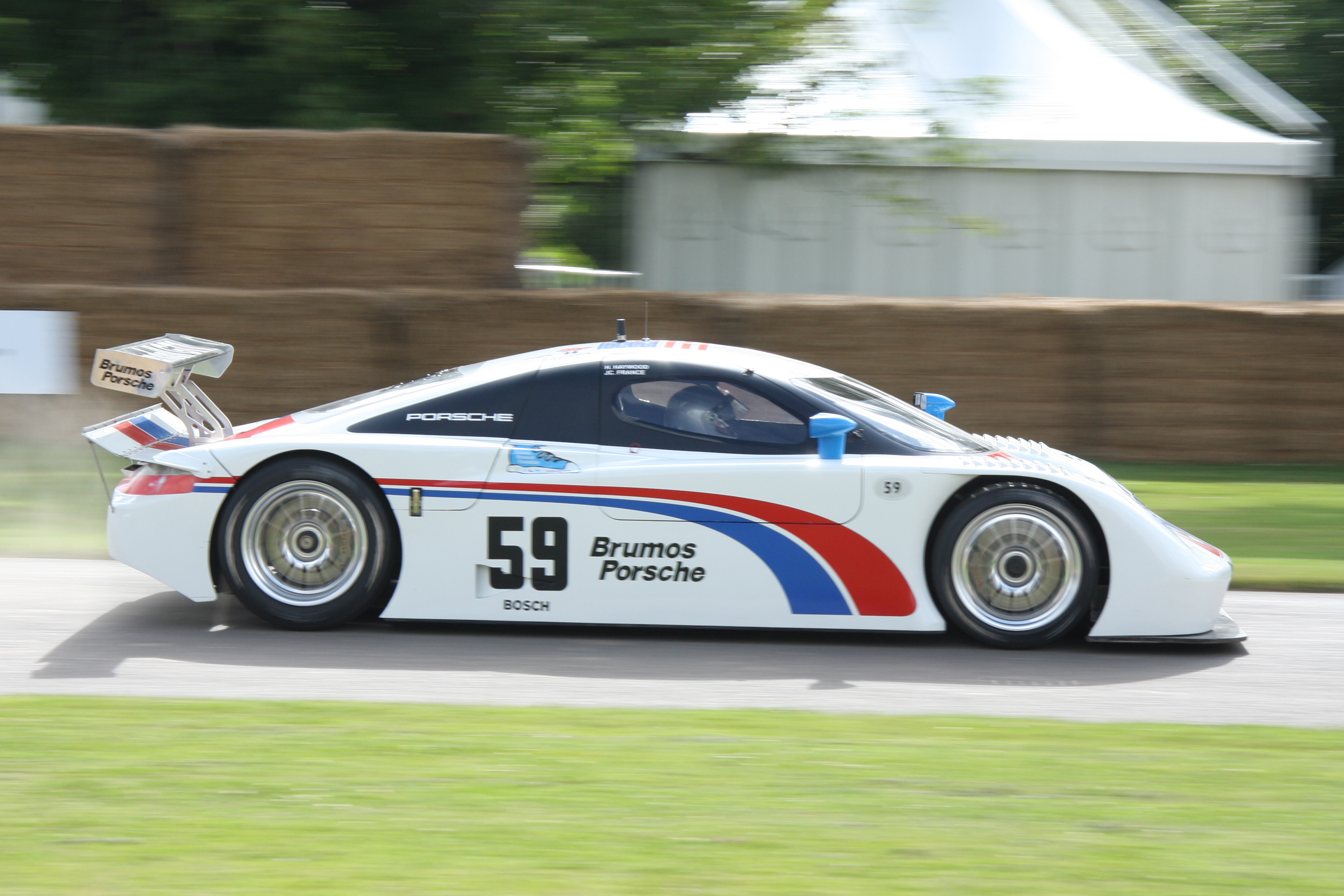
- The No. 59 FDSC/03 of Brumos Racing in 2008
- Category: Daytona Prototype
- Constructor: Fabcar
- Production: 2003

Technical specifications
- Chassis: Carbon fiber monocoque
- Suspension: Double wishbones, push-rod actuated coil springs over shock absorbers, anti-roll bar
- Length: 4,572 mm (180.0 in)
- Width: 1,994 mm (78.5 in)
- Height: 1,067 mm (42.0 in)
- Wheelbase: 2,794 mm (110.0 in)
- Engine: Porsche / Lexus/Toyota / BMW 3,600–5,000 cc (3.6–5.0 L; 219.7–305.1 cu in) 24-valve to 32-valve, OHC/DOHC B6/V8, naturally-aspirated, mid-mounted
- Transmission: Emco 6-speed sequential
- Weight: 2,000 lb (907.2 kg)

Competition history
- Notable entrants: Brumos Racing
- Debut: 2003 24 Hours of Daytona
- First win: 2003 Nextel Grand Prix of Miami
- Last win: 2003 6 Hours of Mont-Tremblant
- Last event: 2008 24 Hours of Daytona
Races	Wins	Podiums	Poles
169	5	11	6
- Teams' Championships: 0
- Constructors' Championships: 1 (2003 Rolex Sports Car Series)
- Drivers' Championships: 0

The Fabcar FDSC/03, and its evolution, the Fabcar FDSC/03 Evo, are first-generation Daytona Prototype, designed, developed and built by American manufacturing company, Fabcar Engineering, for the Grand-Am Rolex Sports Car Series, in 2003.
