= Doran JE4 =

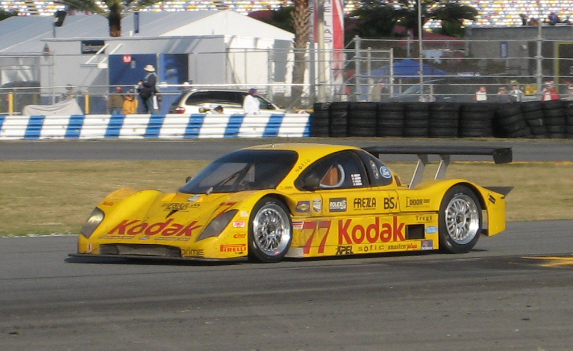
- Category: Daytona Prototype
- Constructor: Doran Racing

Technical specifications
- Chassis: Hybrid Aluminum Honeycomb & Aluminum Sheet over Steel Tube Monocoque Chassis
- Suspension (front): Unequal A-Arms w/Pull-Rod Activated Ohlins Shock Absorbers & Springs
- Suspension (rear): Unequal A-Arms w/Pull-Rod Activated Ohlins Shock Absorbers & Springs
- Length: 4,445 mm (175.0 in)
- Width: 2,007 mm (79.0 in)
- Height: 1,222 mm (48.1 in)
- Wheelbase: 2,845 mm (112.0 in)
- Engine: Chevrolet / Ford / Lexus / Pontiac 4,350–5,000 cc (4.4–5.0 L; 265.5–305.1 cu in) 32-valve, DOHC V8, naturally-aspirated, mid-mounted
- Transmission: Emco 6-speed sequential
- Weight: 968 kg (2,134.1 lb)

Competition history
Races	Wins	Podiums	Poles
72	8	14	6

The Doran JE4 is a first-generation Daytona Prototype race car chassis made by Doran Racing, that debuted in the 2003 Grand-American Rolex Sports Car Series. The car was powered by a number of engine manufacturers, including Chevrolet, Ford, Lexus, and Pontiac.
