= Sylvain Tremblay =

Canadian racing driver (born 1965)

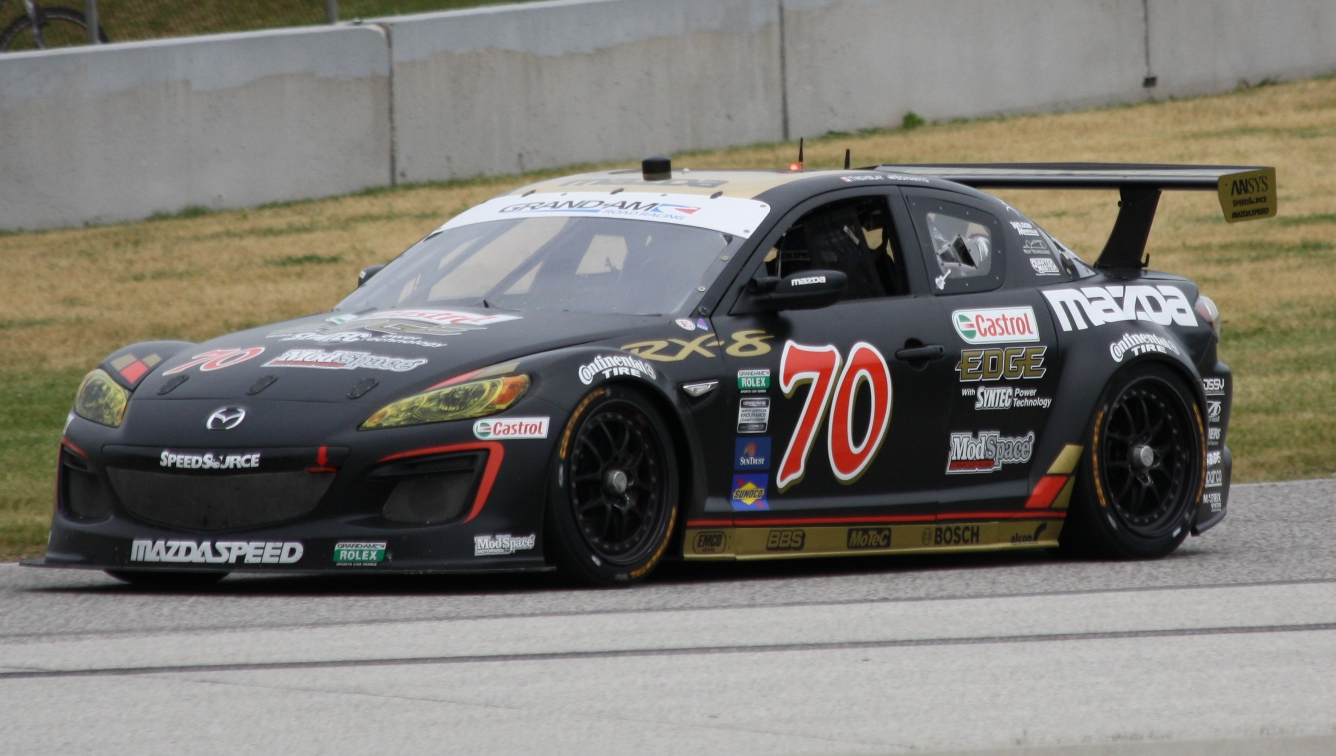
- Tremblay in 2012
- Nationality: (Canada) Canadian
- Born: 9 August 1965 (age 61) Montreal, Canada
- Categorisation: FIA Gold (until 2015); FIA Silver (2016–)

Championship titles
- 2004 2001: Grand-Am Cup – ST; Grand-Am Cup – GS

Sylvain Tremblay (born 9 August 1965) is a Canadian racing driver and team owner who last competed in the United SportsCar Championship for SpeedSource. He founded the team in 1995, and primarily raced Mazda machinery in the Rolex Sports Car Series before running the factory Mazda Prototype from 2014 to 2017.

== Career ==
Born in Montreal, Tremblay began his racing career at the age of 16, primarily racing in SCCA-organized events in his early career. In 1995, Tremblay founded SpeedSource Race Engineering in South Florida to primarily field Mazda machinery in SCCA competitions and the Speedvision Cup. After finishing third in the GS class of the 1997 IMSA Speedvision Cup, Tremblay was third in the GT3 class of the 1999 24 Hours of Daytona for G & W Motorsports, as well as also finishing third in the GT class of the 12 Hours of Sebring for the same team later that year.

Following a part-time campaign in the BMG Motorola Cup the following year, Tremblay returned to the series full-time for 2001, racing for his SpeedSource team aboard a Porsche 911 GT3. In his first full season in the series, Tremblay won seven of the season's ten races to secure the GS title. Two more seasons in the series then ensued, in which he dabbled across three classes, before a title-winninig campaign in the ST class in 2004, driving a Mazda RX-8. During 2004, Tremblay also raced part-time in the Rolex Sports Car Series for his own team, fielding a Multimatic MDP1.

Remaining in the Grand-Am Cup to defend his title the following year, Tremblay scored five wins as he ended the year runner-up in points. Another season in the Grand-Am Cup then ensued, in which he finished fifth in points with two podiums to his name, a year in which he also returned to the Rolex Sports Car Series, scoring a GT class podium at Miami in his RX-8. Switching to the latter full-time for 2007, Tremblay won in Mexico, Miami and the second Daytona enduro to end the year sixth in the GT standings. Continuing in the series for 2008, Tremblay scored class wins at both Daytona enduros and Barber en route to a third-place points finish. A third full-time season in the series then ensued, in which Tremblay scored a lone win at Laguna Seca, a repeat pole at Daytona and three other podiums to take fifth in the GT standings.

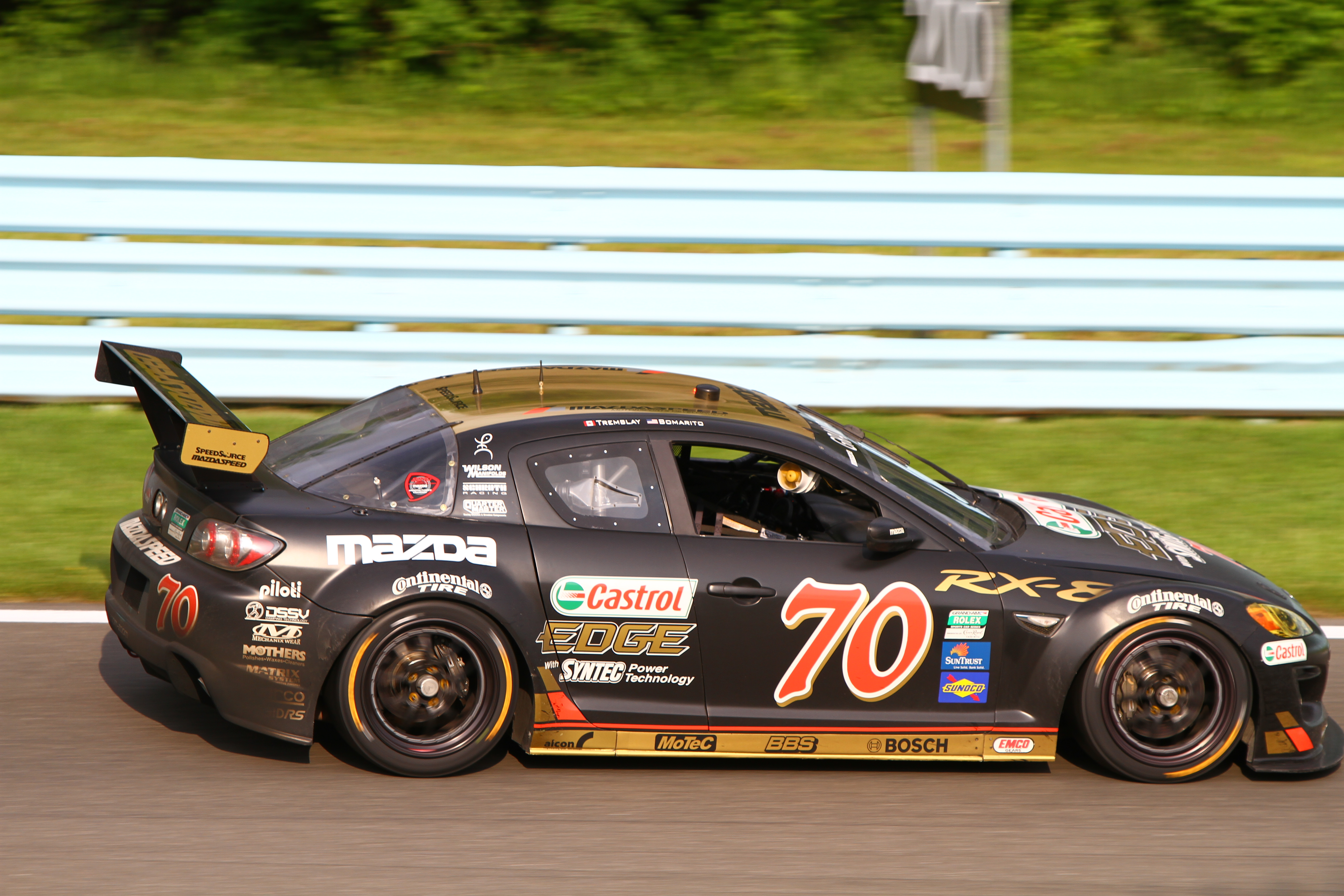
Tremblay's SpeedSource Mazda RX-8 at Watkins Glen in 2011.

In 2010, Tremblay had his most successful year in the series, as he won the 24 Hours of Daytona, the New Jersey enduro and took three other podiums to secure runner-up honors in the GT class. The following year, Tremblay scored a lone win in New Jersey and three other podiums to take third in points, and then following that up with a win at Barber and three podiums in 2012 to finish fourth in points. With the addition of the GX class in 2013, Tremblay and SpeedSource moved to the class, fielding a diesel-powered Mazda6, scoring four wins and standing on the podium in all but one race en route to a third-place points finish as Mazda clinched the Manufacturers' title.

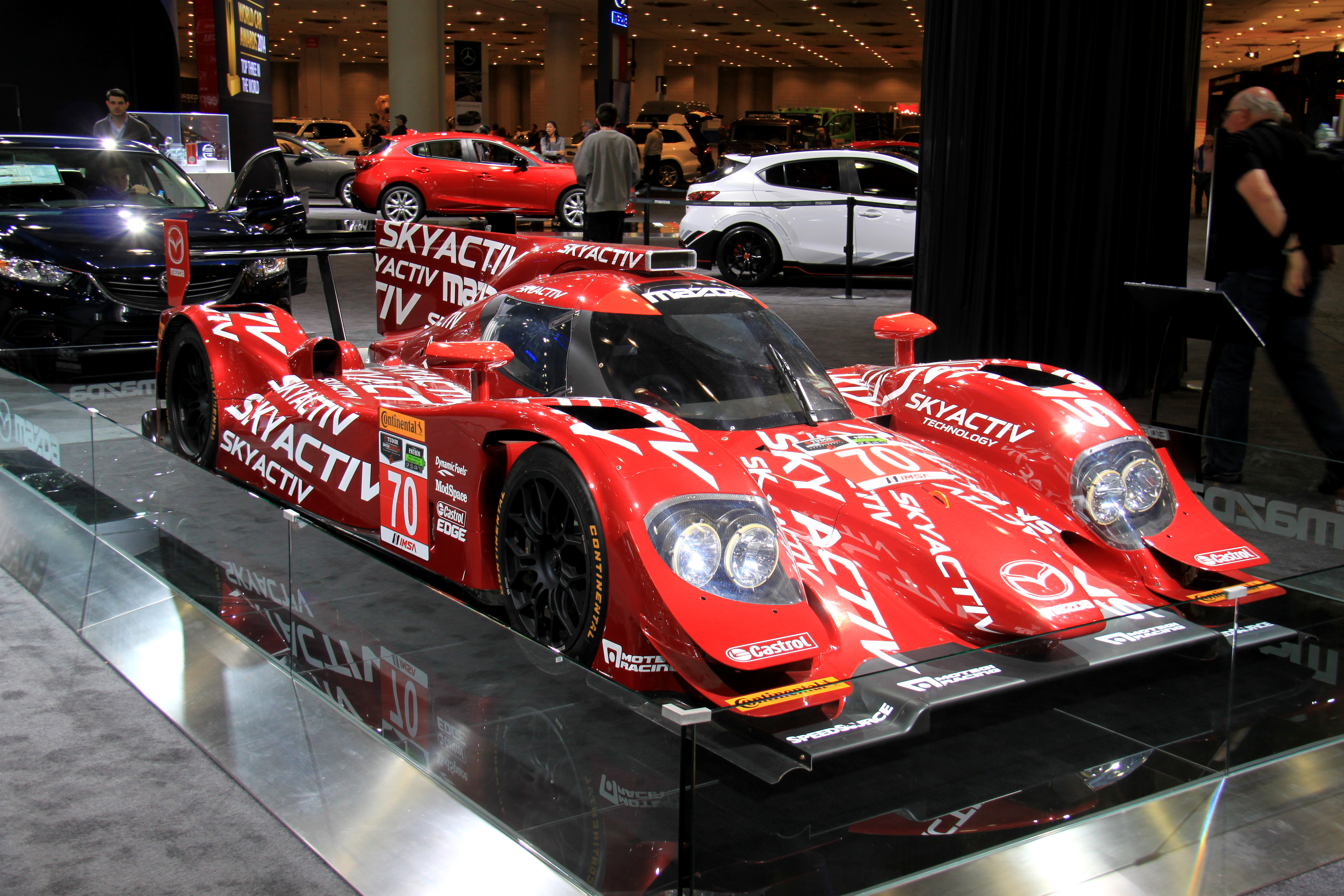
The Skyactiv Mazda Prototype, as raced by Tremblay in 2014.

Following the demise of the GX class and the merger between the Rolex Sports Car Series and the American Le Mans Series in 2014, SpeedSource joined the newly-created United SportsCar Championship, running a pair of works Mazda SKYACTIV-D LMP2 cars in the premier Prototype class. After a full season yielded 12th in points and a best result of seventh at Laguna Seca, Tremblay only drove the endurance rounds in 2015, with non-finishes at Daytona, Sebring and Petit Le Mans. Tremblay then primarily focused on the management of his team, which continued being Mazda's factory team in its DPi endeavours until mid-2017, when the program was stopped with immediate effect after Joest Racing was announced to be taking over for the following year. In December of that year, SpeedSource ceased operations and sold all of its equipment.

== Racing record ==
=== Racing career summary ===
Season	Series	Team	Races	Wins	Poles	F/Laps	Podiums	Points	Position
1984	12 Hours of Sebring – GTU	Cameron Worth	0	0	0	0	0	—N/a	DNA
1994	24 Hours of Daytona – GT3	Pettit Racing	0	0	0	0	0	—N/a	WD
1994	SCCA World Challenge – TC	Pettit Racing	2	0	0	0	0	32	21st
1996	IMSA GT Championship – GTS-2	Mattco Racing	0	0	0	0	0	0	NC
1997	IMSA GT Championship – GTS-3	Mattco Racing	1	0	0	0	0	0	NC
1997	IMSA GT Championship – WSC	Team South Carolina	1	0	0	0	0	17	61st
1997	IMSA Speedvision Cup – GS	SpeedSource							**3rd**
1998	IMSA GT Championship – GT2	Rohr	1	0	0	0	0	0	NC
1998	IMSA GT Championship – GT3	G & W Motorsports	2	0	0	0	0	0	NC
1999	24 Hours of Daytona – GT3	G & W Motorsports	1	0	0	0	1	—N/a	**3rd**
1999	American Le Mans Series – GT	G & W Motorsports	1	0	0	0	1	20	43rd
1999	BMG Motorola Cup – GS	Theetge Motorsports	1	0	0	0	0		
2000	BMG Motorola Cup – GS	Theetge Motorsports	3	2	1	1	2	76	23rd
2001	Grand-Am Cup – GS	SpeedSource	10	7	?	?	8	333	**1st**
2001	Grand-Am Cup – SGS	SpeedSource	4	1	?	?	1		
2001	Grand American Road Racing Championship – GT	Orbit Racing	1	0	0	0	0	22	58th
2001	Grand American Road Racing Championship – GT	SpeedSource	0	0	0	0	0	22	58th
2002	Rolex Sports Car Series – GT	Orbit Racing	1	0	0	0	1	58	28th
2002	Rolex Sports Car Series – GT	SpeedSource	1	0	0	0	0	58	28th
2002	American Le Mans Series – GT	SpeedSource	0	0	0	0	0	0	NC
2002	Grand-Am Cup – GS I	SpeedSource	9	0	?	?	2		
2002	Grand-Am Cup – GS II	SpeedSource	7	1	?	?	2		
2002	Grand-Am Cup – ST I	SpeedSource	2	0	?	?	0		
2002	Spa 24 Hours – 1M	Banking Compétition	1	0	0	0	0	—N/a	7th
2003	Rolex Sports Car Series – GT	Scuderia Ferrari of Washington	1	0	0	0	0	18	36th
2003	Rolex Sports Car Series – GT	SpeedSource	1	0	0	0	0	18	36th
2003	Rolex Sports Car Series – DP	SpeedSource	4	0	0	0	0	97	14th
2003	Grand-Am Cup – GS I	SpeedSource	7	0	?	?	0		
2003	Grand-Am Cup – ST I	SpeedSource	8	2	?	?	3		
2003	Grand-Am Cup – GS II	SpeedSource	2	0	?	?	0		
2004	Grand-Am Cup – ST	SpeedSource	10	4	?	?	6	288	**1st**
2004	Rolex Sports Car Series – Prototype	SpeedSource	3	0	0	0	0	59	36th
2005	Grand-Am Cup – ST	SpeedSource	9	5	?	?	6	287	**2nd**
2006	Rolex Sports Car Series – GT	SpeedSource	4	0	0	0	1	95	38th
2006	Grand-Am Koni Challenge – ST	SpeedSource	10	0	?	?	2	229	5th
2007	Rolex Sports Car Series – GT	SpeedSource	13	3	0	0	5	314	6th
2007	Grand-Am Koni Challenge – ST	SpeedSource	2	0	?	?	0	13	92nd
2008	Rolex Sports Car Series – GT	SpeedSource	13	3	4	0	6	351	**3rd**
2009	Rolex Sports Car Series – GT	SpeedSource	12	1	1	1	4	301	5th
2010	Rolex Sports Car Series – GT	SpeedSource	12	2	2	0	5	338	**2nd**
2011	Rolex Sports Car Series – GT	SpeedSource	12	1	0	0	4	315	**3rd**
2012	Rolex Sports Car Series – GT	SpeedSource	13	1	0	1	4	336	4th
2012	Continental Tire Sports Car Challenge – ST	Freedom Autosport	1	0	1	0	0	15	78th
2013	Rolex Sports Car Series – GX	SpeedSource	12	4	1	6	11	380	**3rd**
2014	United SportsCar Championship – Prototype	SpeedSource	10	0	0	0	0	179	12th
2015	United SportsCar Championship – Prototype	SpeedSource	3	0	0	0	0	67	16th

=== Complete American Le Mans Series results ===
(key) (Races in bold indicate pole position)

Year	Team	Class	Make	Engine	1	2	3	4	5	6	7	8	9	10	Rank	Points	Ref
1999	G & W Motorsports	GT	Porsche 911 GT2 Evo	Porsche 3.8 L Turbo Flat-6	SEB; 3	ATL	MOS	SON	POR	PET	LGA	LVS			43rd	20	
2002	Speedsource	GT	Porsche 996 GT3-R	Porsche 3.6 L Flat-6	SEB	SON	MOH	ELK	WAS; WD	TRO	MOS	LGA	MIA	PET	NC	0	

=== Complete Michelin Pilot Challenge results ===
(key) (Races in bold indicate pole position) (Races in italics indicate fastest lap)

Year	Entrant	Class	Make	1	2	3	4	5	6	7	8	9	10	11	12	Rank	Points
1999	Theetge Motorsports	GS	Mazda RX-7 Turbo	SEB	ATL	MOS1	MOS2	TOR	TRO	ATL	WGL	SEB	DAY; 11			?	?
2000	Theetge Motorsports	GS	Acura NSX	DAY	SEB	PHX	HMS	MOH	ELK; 1	TOR; 11	MOS	WGL	VIR; 1			23rd	76
2001	SpeedSource	GS	Porsche 911	DAY; 25	HMS; 1	PHX; 1	WGL; 2	MOH; 1	MOS; 1	VIR; 1	ELK; 1	TRO; 1	DAY; 5			1st	333
2001	SpeedSource	SGS	Porsche 911 Supercup			PHX; 5	WGL; 6	MOH; 6					DAY; 1			?	?
2002	SpeedSource	GS II	Porsche 911	DAY; 3	CAL; 4	PHX; 4	WGL; 5	VIR1; 4	MOH; 6				DAY; 1			?	?
2002	SpeedSource	GS I	Porsche 996 GT3 Cup	DAY; 6	CAL; 3	PHX; 13	WGL; 8	VIR1; 4	MOH; 5	VIR2; 9	MTT; 7		DAY; 2			?	?
2002	SpeedSource	ST I	Porsche Boxster							VIR2; 9		MOS; 8				?	?
2003	SpeedSource	GS I	Porsche 996 GT3 Cup	DAY; 4	HMS; 4	PHX; 6	BAR; 5	CAL; 11	WGL; 6	MOH; 5						?	?
2003	SpeedSource	ST I	Porsche Boxster			PHX; 10	BAR; 1		WGL; 3	MOH; 6	MOS; 4	MTT; 5	VIR; 4	DAY; 1		?	?
2003	SpeedSource	GS II	Porsche 911						WGL; 12	MOH; 6						?	?
2004	SpeedSource	Street Tuner	Mazda RX-8	DAY; 24	HMS; 6	PHX; 1	MTT; 5	WGL; 5	MOH; 1	HMS; 1	VIR; 2	BAR; 1	CAL; 2			1st	288
2005	SpeedSource	Street Tuner	Mazda RX-8	DAY; 4	CAL; 1	LGA; 1	WGL; 29	MOS; 2	BAR; 1	TRO; 1	MOH; 5	PHX; 1	VIR; 5			2nd	287
2006	SpeedSource	Street Tuner	Mazda RX-8	DAY; 7	VIR; 12	LGA; 12	PHX; 5	LIM; 5	MOH; 2	BAR; 5	TRO; 6	UTA; 2	VIR; 33			5th	229
2007	SpeedSource	Street Tuner	Mazda RX-8	DAY; 34	HMS	IOW	LGA	LIM	MOS	MOH	WGL	BAR	TRO	UTA	VIR; 18	92nd	13
2012	Freedom Autosport	Street Tuner	Mazda MX-5	DAY	BAR	HMS	NJMP	MOH	ELK	**WGL**; 16	IMS	LGA	LIM			78th	15

=== Complete Grand-Am Rolex Sports Car Series results ===
(key) (Races in bold indicate pole position; results in italics indicate fastest lap)

Year	Team	Class	Make	Engine	1	2	3	4	5	6	7	8	9	10	11	12	13	Rank	Points	Ref
2001	Orbit Racing	GT	Porsche 996 GT3-RS	Porsche 3.6 L Flat-6	DAY	MIA	PHX	WGL	LIM	MOH; 12	ELK							58th	22	
2001	SpeedSource	GT	Porsche 996 GT3 Cup	Porsche 3.6 L Flat-6								TRO; WD	WGL	DAY				58th	22	
2002	Orbit Racing	GT	Porsche 996 GT3-RS	Porsche 3.6 L Flat-6	DAY; 2													28th	58	
2002	SpeedSource	GT	Porsche 996 GT3-R	Porsche 3.6 L Flat-6		MIA; 5	CAL	PHX	WGL	DAY	WGL	VIR	MTT	DAY				28th	58	
2003	Scuderia Ferrari of Washington	GT	Ferrari 360 Modena GT	Ferrari 3.6 L V8	DAY; 13	MIA												36th	18	
2003	SpeedSource	GT	Porsche 996 GT3 Cup	Porsche 3.6 L Flat-6			PHX; 20	BAR	CAL	WGL	MOH	DAY						36th	18	
2003	SpeedSource	DP	Multimatic MDP1	Ford 5.0 L V8									WGL; 7	MTT; 6	VIR; 6	DAY; 8		14th	97	
2004	SpeedSource	P	Multimatic MDP1	Ford 5.0 L V8	DAY; 13	MIA; 12	PHX; 17	MTT	WGL; 13	DAY; 9	MOH	WGL; WD	MIA	VIR	BAR	CAL		36th	59	
2006	SpeedSource	GT	Mazda RX-8	Mazda 1.3L Renesis	DAY; 24	MEX	MIA; 2	VIR; 14	LAG	PHX; DNA	LIM	WGL	MOH	DAY; 18	BAR	SON	MIL	38th	95	
2007	SpeedSource	GT	Mazda RX-8	Mazda 1.3L 3-Rotor	DAY; 5	MEX; 1	MIA; 1	VIR; 2	LAG; 7	LIM; 11	WGL; 22	MOH; 2	DAY; 1	IOW; 13	BAR; 5	CGV; 9	MIL; 24	6th	314	
2008	SpeedSource	GT	Mazda RX-8	Mazda 2.0L 3-Rotor	**DAY**; 1	MIA; 5	MEX; 13	VIR; 11	**LAG**; 3	LIM; 2	WGL; 8	MOH; 7	**DAY**; 1	**BAR**; 1	CGV; 2	NJMP; 16	MIL; 5	3rd	351	
2009	SpeedSource	GT	Mazda RX-8	Mazda 2.0L 3-Rotor	**DAY**; 17	VIR; 3	NJMP; 11	LAG; 1	WGL; 4	MOH; 11	DAY; 2	BAR; 2	WGL; 8	CGV; 4	MIL; 9	MIA; 5		5th	301	
2010	SpeedSource	GT	Mazda RX-8	Mazda 2.0L 3-Rotor	DAY; 1	MIA; 4	BAR; 3	VIR; 9	LIM; 4	WGL; 2	MOH; 12†	**DAY**; 6	NJMP; 1	**WGL**; 2	CGV; 7	MIL; 4		2nd	338	
2011	SpeedSource	GT	Mazda RX-8	Mazda 2.0L 3-Rotor	DAY; 6	MIA; 4	BAR; 3	VIR; 14	LIM; 12	WGL; 10	ELK; 7	LAG; 3	NJMP; 1	WGL; 4	CGV; 2	MOH; 5		3rd	315	
2012	SpeedSource	GT	Mazda RX-8	Mazda 2.0L 3-Rotor	DAY; 6	BAR; 1	MIA; 12	NJMP; 7	BEL; 2	MOH; 4	ELK; 3	WGL; 7	IMS; 2	WGL; 12	CGV; 5	LAG; 9	LIM; 11	4th	336	
2013	SpeedSource	GX	Mazda6 GX	Mazda 2.2L I4 Diesel	DAY; 4	COA; 2	BAR; 3	ATL; 3	BEL; 3	MOH; 1	**WGL**; 3	IMS; 1	ELK; 3	KNS; 3	LAG; 1	LIM; 1		3rd	380	

=== Complete IMSA SportsCar Championship results ===
(key) (Races in bold indicate pole position; results in italics indicate fastest lap)

Year	Team	Class	Make	Engine	1	2	3	4	5	6	7	8	9	10	11	Pos.	Points	Ref
2014	SpeedSource	P	Mazda Prototype	Mazda 2.2 L SKYACTIV-D (SH-VPTS) I4 Turbo (diesel)	DAY; 14	SEB; 11	LBH; 11†	LGA; 7	DET; 9	WGL; 13†	MOS; 10	IND; 10	ELK; DNS	COA; 10	PET; 8	12th	179	
2015	SpeedSource	P	Mazda Prototype	Mazda 2.2 L SKYACTIV-D (SH-VPTS) I4 Turbo (diesel)	DAY; 12	SEB; 10	LBH	LGA	DET	WGL	MOS	ELK	COA	PET; 7		16th	67	
