= 2010 Rolex Sports Car Series =

11th season of the racing series organized by Grand-Am

Seasons
- ← 2009 2011 →

The 2010 Rolex Sports Car Series season was the 11th season of the Grand-Am Rolex Sports Car Series presented by Crown Royal Cask No. 16. It began on January 30 with the Rolex 24 at Daytona and concluded on September 12 at Miller Motorsports Park.

This was Pirelli's final season as the sole tire partner and supplier in Rolex Sports Car Series as the company announced that it would not renew its contract at the end of the season and thus coinciding with its entry into FIA Formula 1 World Championship, GP2 Series and GP2 Asia Series in 2011, and its discontinuation of its Grand-Am program. Continental would take over as official Rolex Sports Car Series tire partner beginning from 2011 season.

== Schedule ==
Late in the 2009 season, the series tested at Indianapolis Motor Speedway as a proposed addition to the schedule, however this failed to materialize for 2010.

The final schedule featured many changes and realignments from 2009. Laguna Seca has been removed, leaving Miller as the only race in the Western United States. The race at Lime Rock on Memorial Day returned after being absent in 2009, this time with the DP class in addition to the GT class. Meanwhile, the race at Barber Motorsports Park was held jointly with the IndyCar Series' Indy Grand Prix of Alabama.

Rnd	Race	Length/Duration	Circuit	Location	Date
1	Rolex 24 At Daytona	24 hours	Daytona International Speedway	Daytona Beach, Florida	January 30–31
2	Grand Prix of Miami	2 hours 45 minutes	Homestead-Miami Speedway	Homestead, Florida	March 6
3	Porsche 250	250 miles	Barber Motorsports Park	Birmingham, Alabama	April 10
4	Bosch Engineering 250	250 miles	Virginia International Raceway	Danville, Virginia	April 24
5	Memorial Day Classic	2 hours 45 minutes	Lime Rock Park	Lime Rock, Connecticut	May 31
6	Sahlen's Six Hours of The Glen	6 hours	Watkins Glen International	Watkins Glen, New York	June 5
7	EMCO Gears Classic Presented by KeyBank	2 hours 45 minutes	Mid-Ohio Sports Car Course	Lexington, Ohio	June 19
8	Brumos Porsche 250	250 miles	Daytona International Speedway	Daytona Beach, Florida	July 3
9	NJMP 250 presented by Crown Royal	2 hours 45 minutes	New Jersey Motorsports Park	Millville, New Jersey	July 18
10	Crown Royal 200 at The Glen	200 miles	Watkins Glen short	Watkins Glen, New York	August 7
11	Montreal 200	2 hours or 200 miles	Circuit Gilles Villeneuve	Montreal, Quebec	August 28
12	Utah 250	2 hours 45 minutes or 250 miles	Miller Motorsports Park	Tooele, Utah	September 11

== Entry list ==
Team	No	Drivers	Chassis Engine	Sponsor	Class	Rounds
Chip Ganassi Racing with Felix Sabates	01	(United States) Scott Pruett	Riley Mk. XX; BMW 5.0L V8	Telmex; Target	DP	All
Chip Ganassi Racing with Felix Sabates	01	(Mexico) Memo Rojas	Riley Mk. XX; BMW 5.0L V8	Telmex; Target	DP	All
Chip Ganassi Racing with Felix Sabates	01	(Italy) Max Papis	Riley Mk. XX; BMW 5.0L V8	Telmex; Target	DP	1
Chip Ganassi Racing with Felix Sabates	01	(United Kingdom) Justin Wilson	Riley Mk. XX; BMW 5.0L V8	Telmex; Target	DP	1
Chip Ganassi Racing with Felix Sabates	02	(New Zealand) Scott Dixon	Riley Mk. XX; BMW 5.0L V8	Target; Telmex	DP	1
Chip Ganassi Racing with Felix Sabates	02	(United Kingdom) Dario Franchitti	Riley Mk. XX; BMW 5.0L V8	Target; Telmex	DP	1
Chip Ganassi Racing with Felix Sabates	02	(United States) Jamie McMurray	Riley Mk. XX; BMW 5.0L V8	Target; Telmex	DP	1
Chip Ganassi Racing with Felix Sabates	02	(Colombia) Juan Pablo Montoya	Riley Mk. XX; BMW 5.0L V8	Target; Telmex	DP	1
Beyer Racing	2	(Germany) Jan-Dirk Lueders	Crawford DP08; Chevrolet 5.0L V8		DP	1
Beyer Racing	2	(United States) Jared Beyer	Crawford DP08; Chevrolet 5.0L V8		DP	1
Beyer Racing	2	(United States) Dane Cameron	Crawford DP08; Chevrolet 5.0L V8		DP	1
Beyer Racing	2	(United States) Romeo Kapudija	Crawford DP08; Chevrolet 5.0L V8		DP	1
Beyer Racing	2	(United States) Cort Wagner	Crawford DP08; Chevrolet 5.0L V8		DP	1
Michael Shank Racing	6	(United States) Brian Frisselle	Riley Mk. XX; Ford 5.0L V8 / Dallara DP08; Ford 5.0L V8	"The Pit Stop" on Norris Lake	DP	All
Michael Shank Racing	6	(Canada) Michael Valiante	Riley Mk. XX; Ford 5.0L V8 / Dallara DP08; Ford 5.0L V8	"The Pit Stop" on Norris Lake	DP	All
Michael Shank Racing	6	(South Africa) Mark Patterson	Riley Mk. XX; Ford 5.0L V8 / Dallara DP08; Ford 5.0L V8	"The Pit Stop" on Norris Lake	DP	1, 6
Michael Shank Racing	6	(United States) A. J. Allmendinger	Riley Mk. XX; Ford 5.0L V8 / Dallara DP08; Ford 5.0L V8	"The Pit Stop" on Norris Lake	DP	1
Michael Shank Racing	60	(United States) John Pew	Riley Mk. XX; Ford 5.0L V8	Crown Royal	DP	All
Michael Shank Racing	60	(Brazil) Oswaldo Negri	Riley Mk. XX; Ford 5.0L V8	Crown Royal	DP	All
Michael Shank Racing	60	(United States) Burt Frisselle	Riley Mk. XX; Ford 5.0L V8	Crown Royal	DP	1
Michael Shank Racing	60	(Canada) Mark Wilkins	Riley Mk. XX; Ford 5.0L V8	Crown Royal	DP	1
Banner Racing	07	(United States) Paul Edwards	Chevrolet Corvette C6; Chevrolet 5.7L V8	Texas Heart Institute; Fisk Electric; Mobil 1 Las Vegas Bikefest; Airjax.com	GT	All
Banner Racing	07	(United States) Scott Russell	Chevrolet Corvette C6; Chevrolet 5.7L V8	Texas Heart Institute; Fisk Electric; Mobil 1 Las Vegas Bikefest; Airjax.com	GT	1–4, 6–12
Banner Racing	07	(United States) Leighton Reese	Chevrolet Corvette C6; Chevrolet 5.7L V8	Texas Heart Institute; Fisk Electric; Mobil 1 Las Vegas Bikefest; Airjax.com	GT	1–2, 6
Banner Racing	07	(United States) Andy Lally	Chevrolet Corvette C6; Chevrolet 5.7L V8	Texas Heart Institute; Fisk Electric; Mobil 1 Las Vegas Bikefest; Airjax.com	GT	5
Banner Racing	07	(United States) Davy Jones	Chevrolet Corvette C6; Chevrolet 5.7L V8	Texas Heart Institute; Fisk Electric; Mobil 1 Las Vegas Bikefest; Airjax.com	GT	1
Banner Racing	07	(United States) John McCutchen	Chevrolet Corvette C6; Chevrolet 5.7L V8	Texas Heart Institute; Fisk Electric; Mobil 1 Las Vegas Bikefest; Airjax.com	GT	1
Starworks Motorsport	7	(United States) Bill Lester	Riley Mk. XX; BMW 5.0L V8	IPO Solutions; Xtreme Indoor Karting; Flex-Box	DP	1–10
Starworks Motorsport	7	(United Kingdom) Ian James	Riley Mk. XX; BMW 5.0L V8	IPO Solutions; Xtreme Indoor Karting; Flex-Box	DP	1–2
Starworks Motorsport	7	(South Africa) Dion von Moltke	Riley Mk. XX; BMW 5.0L V8	IPO Solutions; Xtreme Indoor Karting; Flex-Box	DP	1
Starworks Motorsport	7	(Canada) Mike Forest	Riley Mk. XX; BMW 5.0L V8	IPO Solutions; Xtreme Indoor Karting; Flex-Box	DP	1
Starworks Motorsport	7	(Denmark) Kasper Andersen	Riley Mk. XX; BMW 5.0L V8	IPO Solutions; Xtreme Indoor Karting; Flex-Box	DP	3, 5–6
Starworks Motorsport	7	(United States) Joey Hand	Riley Mk. XX; BMW 5.0L V8	IPO Solutions; Xtreme Indoor Karting; Flex-Box	DP	4
Starworks Motorsport	7	(France) Nelson Philippe	Riley Mk. XX; BMW 5.0L V8	IPO Solutions; Xtreme Indoor Karting; Flex-Box	DP	6–8
Starworks Motorsport	7	(United States) Dane Cameron	Riley Mk. XX; BMW 5.0L V8	IPO Solutions; Xtreme Indoor Karting; Flex-Box	DP	9
Starworks Motorsport	7	(Australia) James Davison	Riley Mk. XX; BMW 5.0L V8	IPO Solutions; Xtreme Indoor Karting; Flex-Box	DP	10
Starworks Motorsport	8	(United Kingdom) Ryan Dalziel	Riley Mk. XX; BMW 5.0L V8	Corsa Car Care Products; Xtreme Indoor Karting	DP	2–12
Starworks Motorsport	8	(Canada) Mike Forest	Riley Mk. XX; BMW 5.0L V8	Corsa Car Care Products; Xtreme Indoor Karting	DP	2–12
Starworks Motorsport	8	(Australia) James Davison	Riley Mk. XX; BMW 5.0L V8	Corsa Car Care Products; Xtreme Indoor Karting	DP	6
Action Express Racing	9	(Portugal) João Barbosa	Riley Mk. XX; Porsche 5.0L V8		DP	All
Action Express Racing	9	(United States) Terry Borcheller	Riley Mk. XX; Porsche 5.0L V8		DP	All
Action Express Racing	9	(United Kingdom) Ryan Dalziel	Riley Mk. XX; Porsche 5.0L V8		DP	1
Action Express Racing	9	(Germany) Mike Rockenfeller	Riley Mk. XX; Porsche 5.0L V8		DP	1
Action Express Racing	9	(United States) J. C. France	Riley Mk. XX; Porsche 5.0L V8		DP	4–7, 9–12
SunTrust Racing	10	(Italy) Max Angelelli	Dallara DP08; Ford 5.0L V8	SunTrust	DP	All
SunTrust Racing	10	(United States) Ricky Taylor	Dallara DP08; Ford 5.0L V8	SunTrust	DP	All
SunTrust Racing	10	(Portugal) Pedro Lamy	Dallara DP08; Ford 5.0L V8	SunTrust	DP	1
SunTrust Racing	10	(South Africa) Wayne Taylor	Dallara DP08; Ford 5.0L V8	SunTrust	DP	1, 6
Autometric Motorsports	14	(United States) Daniel Graeff	Porsche 997 GT3 Cup; Porsche 3.6L Flat-6		GT	1
Autometric Motorsports	14	(United States) Glen Gatlin	Porsche 997 GT3 Cup; Porsche 3.6L Flat-6		GT	1
Autometric Motorsports	14	(United States) Cory Friedman	Porsche 997 GT3 Cup; Porsche 3.6L Flat-6		GT	1
Autometric Motorsports	14	(United States) Seth Thomas	Porsche 997 GT3 Cup; Porsche 3.6L Flat-6		GT	1
Autometric Motorsports	14	(United States) Ron Yarab Jr.	Porsche 997 GT3 Cup; Porsche 3.6L Flat-6		GT	1
Dyson Racing	16	(United States) Davy Jones	Lola B08/70; Ford 5.0L V8	Godstone Ranch	DP	12
Dyson Racing	16	(United States) John McCutchen	Lola B08/70; Ford 5.0L V8	Godstone Ranch	DP	12
The Racer's Group; Guardian Angel Motorsports	18	(United States) Bob Doyle	Porsche 997 GT3 Cup; Porsche 3.6L Flat-6	Love146.org; Matthew R. Greer Children's Foundation; Victorylanewealth.com; HWI Motorsports; ConvergEx	GT	1
The Racer's Group; Guardian Angel Motorsports	18	(United States) Bruce Ledoux	Porsche 997 GT3 Cup; Porsche 3.6L Flat-6	Love146.org; Matthew R. Greer Children's Foundation; Victorylanewealth.com; HWI Motorsports; ConvergEx	GT	1
The Racer's Group; Guardian Angel Motorsports	18	(United States) David Quinlan	Porsche 997 GT3 Cup; Porsche 3.6L Flat-6	Love146.org; Matthew R. Greer Children's Foundation; Victorylanewealth.com; HWI Motorsports; ConvergEx	GT	1
The Racer's Group; Guardian Angel Motorsports	18	(United States) Dan Watkins	Porsche 997 GT3 Cup; Porsche 3.6L Flat-6	Love146.org; Matthew R. Greer Children's Foundation; Victorylanewealth.com; HWI Motorsports; ConvergEx	GT	1
The Racer's Group; Guardian Angel Motorsports	18	(United States) Tom Sheehan	Porsche 997 GT3 Cup; Porsche 3.6L Flat-6	Love146.org; Matthew R. Greer Children's Foundation; Victorylanewealth.com; HWI Motorsports; ConvergEx	GT	1
Matt Connolly Motorsports; Black Flag Racing	19	(Republic of Ireland) Sean Breslin	Chevrolet Corvette C6; Chevrolet 5.7L V8	Mitra; P1Groupe.com; AIS Media; ADROC; Cattier Champagne; Gruppo Sipro; A2ZRacegear.com; Maxwell Paper Products	GT	1
Matt Connolly Motorsports; Black Flag Racing	19	(Republic of Ireland) Sean Paul Breslin	Chevrolet Corvette C6; Chevrolet 5.7L V8	Mitra; P1Groupe.com; AIS Media; ADROC; Cattier Champagne; Gruppo Sipro; A2ZRacegear.com; Maxwell Paper Products	GT	1
Matt Connolly Motorsports; Black Flag Racing	19	(Italy) Ricardo Romagnoli	Chevrolet Corvette C6; Chevrolet 5.7L V8	Mitra; P1Groupe.com; AIS Media; ADROC; Cattier Champagne; Gruppo Sipro; A2ZRacegear.com; Maxwell Paper Products	GT	1
Matt Connolly Motorsports; Black Flag Racing	19	(Italy) Diego Romanini	Chevrolet Corvette C6; Chevrolet 5.7L V8	Mitra; P1Groupe.com; AIS Media; ADROC; Cattier Champagne; Gruppo Sipro; A2ZRacegear.com; Maxwell Paper Products	GT	1
Matt Connolly Motorsports; Black Flag Racing	19	(United States) Jason Vinkemulder	Chevrolet Corvette C6; Chevrolet 5.7L V8	Mitra; P1Groupe.com; AIS Media; ADROC; Cattier Champagne; Gruppo Sipro; A2ZRacegear.com; Maxwell Paper Products	GT	1
Matt Connolly Motorsports; Black Flag Racing	19	(United States) Andy Lally	Chevrolet Corvette C6; Chevrolet 5.7L V8	Mitra; P1Groupe.com; AIS Media; ADROC; Cattier Champagne; Gruppo Sipro; A2ZRacegear.com; Maxwell Paper Products	GT	3
Matt Connolly Motorsports; Black Flag Racing	19	(United States) Ross Smith	Chevrolet Corvette C6; Chevrolet 5.7L V8	Mitra; P1Groupe.com; AIS Media; ADROC; Cattier Champagne; Gruppo Sipro; A2ZRacegear.com; Maxwell Paper Products	GT	3
Matt Connolly Motorsports; Black Flag Racing	19	(Colombia) Tomas Steuer	Chevrolet Corvette C6; Chevrolet 5.7L V8	Mitra; P1Groupe.com; AIS Media; ADROC; Cattier Champagne; Gruppo Sipro; A2ZRacegear.com; Maxwell Paper Products	GT	6
Matt Connolly Motorsports; Black Flag Racing	19	(United States) Spencer Trenery	Chevrolet Corvette C6; Chevrolet 5.7L V8	Mitra; P1Groupe.com; AIS Media; ADROC; Cattier Champagne; Gruppo Sipro; A2ZRacegear.com; Maxwell Paper Products	GT	6
Matt Connolly Motorsports; Black Flag Racing	19	(United States) John Weisberg	Chevrolet Corvette C6; Chevrolet 5.7L V8	Mitra; P1Groupe.com; AIS Media; ADROC; Cattier Champagne; Gruppo Sipro; A2ZRacegear.com; Maxwell Paper Products	GT	6
Matt Connolly Motorsports	20	(France) Christophe Lapierre	Porsche 997 GT3 Cup; Porsche 3.6L Flat-6	OFI Asset Management; Bischoff & Scheck Service; AVRA Towage; Voskamp Group; North Sea Petroleum	GT	1
Matt Connolly Motorsports	20	(Netherlands) Jos Menten	Porsche 997 GT3 Cup; Porsche 3.6L Flat-6	OFI Asset Management; Bischoff & Scheck Service; AVRA Towage; Voskamp Group; North Sea Petroleum	GT	1
Matt Connolly Motorsports	20	(Finland) Markus Palttala	Porsche 997 GT3 Cup; Porsche 3.6L Flat-6	OFI Asset Management; Bischoff & Scheck Service; AVRA Towage; Voskamp Group; North Sea Petroleum	GT	1
Matt Connolly Motorsports	20	(Netherlands) Oskar Slingerland	Porsche 997 GT3 Cup; Porsche 3.6L Flat-6	OFI Asset Management; Bischoff & Scheck Service; AVRA Towage; Voskamp Group; North Sea Petroleum	GT	1
Matt Connolly Motorsports	21	(United States) Jim Briody	Pontiac GTO.R; Pontiac 6.0L V8	ROFINCO; P1Groupe.com; AIS Media; A2Z Race Gear	GT	1
Matt Connolly Motorsports	21	(United States) Toto Lassally	Pontiac GTO.R; Pontiac 6.0L V8	ROFINCO; P1Groupe.com; AIS Media; A2Z Race Gear	GT	1
Matt Connolly Motorsports	21	(Italy) Gabrio Rosa	Pontiac GTO.R; Pontiac 6.0L V8	ROFINCO; P1Groupe.com; AIS Media; A2Z Race Gear	GT	1
Matt Connolly Motorsports	21	(Colombia) Tomas Steuer	Pontiac GTO.R; Pontiac 6.0L V8	ROFINCO; P1Groupe.com; AIS Media; A2Z Race Gear	GT	1, 6
Matt Connolly Motorsports	21	(United States) Spencer Trenery	Pontiac GTO.R; Pontiac 6.0L V8	ROFINCO; P1Groupe.com; AIS Media; A2Z Race Gear	GT	1, 6
Matt Connolly Motorsports	21	(Canada) Lee Carpentier	Pontiac GTO.R; Pontiac 6.0L V8	ROFINCO; P1Groupe.com; AIS Media; A2Z Race Gear	GT	12
Matt Connolly Motorsports	21	(United States) Dean Martin	Pontiac GTO.R; Pontiac 6.0L V8	ROFINCO; P1Groupe.com; AIS Media; A2Z Race Gear	GT	12
Bullet Racing	22	(Canada) Ross Bentley	Porsche 997 GT3 Cup; Porsche 3.6L Flat-6		GT	1
Bullet Racing	22	(Canada) Sean McIntosh	Porsche 997 GT3 Cup; Porsche 3.6L Flat-6		GT	1
Bullet Racing	22	(Netherlands) Kees Nierop	Porsche 997 GT3 Cup; Porsche 3.6L Flat-6		GT	1
Bullet Racing	22	(Hong Kong) Darryl O'Young	Porsche 997 GT3 Cup; Porsche 3.6L Flat-6		GT	1
Bullet Racing	22	(Canada) Steve Paquette	Porsche 997 GT3 Cup; Porsche 3.6L Flat-6		GT	1
Alex Job Racing	23	(United States) Jack Baldwin	Porsche 997 GT3 Cup; Porsche 3.6L Flat-6	Foametix; Battery Tender; Uberwurx; The Chicago Boys Porsche	GT	1
Alex Job Racing	23	(Argentina) Claudio Burtin	Porsche 997 GT3 Cup; Porsche 3.6L Flat-6	Foametix; Battery Tender; Uberwurx; The Chicago Boys Porsche	GT	1
Alex Job Racing	23	(Germany) Dominik Farnbacher	Porsche 997 GT3 Cup; Porsche 3.6L Flat-6	Foametix; Battery Tender; Uberwurx; The Chicago Boys Porsche	GT	1
Alex Job Racing	23	(United States) Mitch Pagerey	Porsche 997 GT3 Cup; Porsche 3.6L Flat-6	Foametix; Battery Tender; Uberwurx; The Chicago Boys Porsche	GT	1
Alex Job Racing	23	(Austria) Martin Ragginger	Porsche 997 GT3 Cup; Porsche 3.6L Flat-6	Foametix; Battery Tender; Uberwurx; The Chicago Boys Porsche	GT	1
LG Motorsports	28	(United States) Kelly Collins	Chevrolet Corvette C6; Chevrolet 5.7L V8	LG Motorsports; Wheel Enhancements	GT	2–10
LG Motorsports	28	(United States) Eric Lux	Chevrolet Corvette C6; Chevrolet 5.7L V8	LG Motorsports; Wheel Enhancements	GT	2–10
LG Motorsports	28	(United States) Lou Gigliotti	Chevrolet Corvette C6; Chevrolet 5.7L V8	LG Motorsports; Wheel Enhancements	GT	5–8
Racers Edge Motorsports	30	(United States) Todd Lamb	Mazda RX-8 GT; Mazda 2.0L 3-Rotor	Cobalt Friction; IDEMITSU; Mazda; 3-Dimensional.com	GT	1–6, 8
Racers Edge Motorsports	30	(United States) Jordan Taylor	Mazda RX-8 GT; Mazda 2.0L 3-Rotor	Cobalt Friction; IDEMITSU; Mazda; 3-Dimensional.com	GT	1–11
Racers Edge Motorsports	30	(United States) Jade Buford	Mazda RX-8 GT; Mazda 2.0L 3-Rotor	Cobalt Friction; IDEMITSU; Mazda; 3-Dimensional.com	GT	1, 6–7, 12
Racers Edge Motorsports	30	(United States) John Edwards	Mazda RX-8 GT; Mazda 2.0L 3-Rotor	Cobalt Friction; IDEMITSU; Mazda; 3-Dimensional.com	GT	1
Racers Edge Motorsports	30	(United States) Glenn Bocchino	Mazda RX-8 GT; Mazda 2.0L 3-Rotor	Cobalt Friction; IDEMITSU; Mazda; 3-Dimensional.com	GT	1
Racers Edge Motorsports	30	(Canada) Dave Lacey	Mazda RX-8 GT; Mazda 2.0L 3-Rotor	Cobalt Friction; IDEMITSU; Mazda; 3-Dimensional.com	GT	9–11
Racers Edge Motorsports	30	(United States) Andy Lally	Mazda RX-8 GT; Mazda 2.0L 3-Rotor	Cobalt Friction; IDEMITSU; Mazda; 3-Dimensional.com	GT	12
Marsh Racing	31	(United States) Eric Curran	Chevrolet Corvette C6; Chevrolet 5.7L V8	Whelen Engineering Company	GT	3–12
Marsh Racing	31	(United States) Sonny Whelen	Chevrolet Corvette C6; Chevrolet 5.7L V8	Whelen Engineering Company	GT	3–4, 9
Marsh Racing	31	(United States) Brandon Davis	Chevrolet Corvette C6; Chevrolet 5.7L V8	Whelen Engineering Company	GT	5–6
Marsh Racing	31	(United States) Ken Wilden	Chevrolet Corvette C6; Chevrolet 5.7L V8	Whelen Engineering Company	GT	6–7
Marsh Racing	31	(United States) Boris Said	Chevrolet Corvette C6; Chevrolet 5.7L V8	Whelen Engineering Company	GT	8–12
Corsa Team PR1	32	(United States) Rob Finlay	BMW M6; BMW 5.0L V8	Corsa Car Care Products	GT	1
Corsa Team PR1	32	(United States) Max Hyatt	BMW M6; BMW 5.0L V8	Corsa Car Care Products	GT	1
Corsa Team PR1	32	(United States) Thomas Merrill	BMW M6; BMW 5.0L V8	Corsa Car Care Products	GT	1
Corsa Team PR1	32	(United States) Jeff Westphal	BMW M6; BMW 5.0L V8	Corsa Car Care Products	GT	1
Dempsey Racing	40	(United States) Joe Foster	Mazda RX-8 GT; Mazda 2.0L 3-Rotor	Mazda USA	GT	All
Dempsey Racing	40	(United States) Patrick Dempsey	Mazda RX-8 GT; Mazda 2.0L 3-Rotor	Mazda USA	GT	1–4
Dempsey Racing	40	(United States) Charles Espenlaub	Mazda RX-8 GT; Mazda 2.0L 3-Rotor	Mazda USA	GT	1, 4–12
Dempsey Racing	40	(Canada) Scott Maxwell	Mazda RX-8 GT; Mazda 2.0L 3-Rotor	Mazda USA	GT	1
Dempsey Racing; Team Seattle	41	(United States) Leh Keen	Mazda RX-8 GT; Mazda 2.0L 3-Rotor	Global Diving & Salvage	GT	All
Dempsey Racing; Team Seattle	41	(United States) James Gue	Mazda RX-8 GT; Mazda 2.0L 3-Rotor	Global Diving & Salvage	GT	All
Dempsey Racing; Team Seattle	41	(United States) Don Kitch Jr.	Mazda RX-8 GT; Mazda 2.0L 3-Rotor	Global Diving & Salvage	GT	1
Dempsey Racing; Team Seattle	41	(Canada) Dave Lacey	Mazda RX-8 GT; Mazda 2.0L 3-Rotor	Global Diving & Salvage	GT	1
Team Sahlen	42	(United States) Will Nonnamaker	Mazda RX-8 GT; Mazda 2.0L 3-Rotor	Theracesite.com	GT	1–4, 6–10
Team Sahlen	42	(United States) Joe Sahlen	Mazda RX-8 GT; Mazda 2.0L 3-Rotor	Theracesite.com	GT	1–4, 6, 9–10
Team Sahlen	42	(United States) Wayne Nonnamaker	Mazda RX-8 GT; Mazda 2.0L 3-Rotor	Theracesite.com	GT	1, 6, 12
Team Sahlen	42	(United States) Joe Nonnamaker	Mazda RX-8 GT; Mazda 2.0L 3-Rotor	Theracesite.com	GT	1, 6, 9–10, 12
Team Sahlen	42	(United States) Andy Lally	Mazda RX-8 GT; Mazda 2.0L 3-Rotor	Theracesite.com	GT	7
Team Sahlen	42	(United Kingdom) Andy Wallace	Mazda RX-8 GT; Mazda 2.0L 3-Rotor	Theracesite.com	GT	8
Team Sahlen	43	(United States) Wayne Nonnamaker	Mazda RX-8 GT; Mazda 2.0L 3-Rotor	Theracesite.com	GT	1–4, 6–10, 12
Team Sahlen	43	(United States) Joe Nonnamaker	Mazda RX-8 GT; Mazda 2.0L 3-Rotor	Theracesite.com	GT	1–4, 7–8, 12
Team Sahlen	43	(United States) Will Nonnamaker	Mazda RX-8 GT; Mazda 2.0L 3-Rotor	Theracesite.com	GT	1
Team Sahlen	43	(United States) Joe Sahlen	Mazda RX-8 GT; Mazda 2.0L 3-Rotor	Theracesite.com	GT	1
Team Sahlen	43	(United States) Nick Ham	Mazda RX-8 GT; Mazda 2.0L 3-Rotor	Theracesite.com	GT	6
Team Sahlen	43	(United Kingdom) Andy Wallace	Mazda RX-8 GT; Mazda 2.0L 3-Rotor	Theracesite.com	GT	9
Team Sahlen	43	(United States) Memo Gidley	Mazda RX-8 GT; Mazda 2.0L 3-Rotor	Theracesite.com	GT	10, 12
Magnus Racing	44	(United States) Craig Stanton	Porsche 997 GT3 Cup; Porsche 3.6L Flat-6		GT	All
Magnus Racing	44	(United States) John Potter	Porsche 997 GT3 Cup; Porsche 3.6L Flat-6		GT	All
Magnus Racing	44	(Netherlands) Jeroen Bleekemolen	Porsche 997 GT3 Cup; Porsche 3.6L Flat-6		GT	1, 6
Magnus Racing	44	(Austria) Richard Lietz	Porsche 997 GT3 Cup; Porsche 3.6L Flat-6		GT	1
Autohaus Motorsports	46	(United States) Shane Lewis	Pontiac GXP.R; Pontiac 6.0L V8 / Porsche 997 GT3 Cup; Porsche 3.6L Flat-6 / Chevrolet Camaro GT.R; GM LS3 6.0L V8	Autohaus Motorsports; ZMG Construction; Rincent BTP; Forge Capital Partners; Bank of America	GT	1–4
Autohaus Motorsports	46	(United States) Richard Zahn	Pontiac GXP.R; Pontiac 6.0L V8 / Porsche 997 GT3 Cup; Porsche 3.6L Flat-6 / Chevrolet Camaro GT.R; GM LS3 6.0L V8	Autohaus Motorsports; ZMG Construction; Rincent BTP; Forge Capital Partners; Bank of America	GT	1–3
Autohaus Motorsports	46	(France) Romain Iannetta	Pontiac GXP.R; Pontiac 6.0L V8 / Porsche 997 GT3 Cup; Porsche 3.6L Flat-6 / Chevrolet Camaro GT.R; GM LS3 6.0L V8	Autohaus Motorsports; ZMG Construction; Rincent BTP; Forge Capital Partners; Bank of America	GT	1
Autohaus Motorsports	46	(United States) Peter Collins	Pontiac GXP.R; Pontiac 6.0L V8 / Porsche 997 GT3 Cup; Porsche 3.6L Flat-6 / Chevrolet Camaro GT.R; GM LS3 6.0L V8	Autohaus Motorsports; ZMG Construction; Rincent BTP; Forge Capital Partners; Bank of America	GT	1
Autohaus Motorsports	46	(United States) Andy Pilgrim	Pontiac GXP.R; Pontiac 6.0L V8 / Porsche 997 GT3 Cup; Porsche 3.6L Flat-6 / Chevrolet Camaro GT.R; GM LS3 6.0L V8	Autohaus Motorsports; ZMG Construction; Rincent BTP; Forge Capital Partners; Bank of America	GT	4
Autohaus Motorsports	46	(United States) Lawson Aschenbach	Pontiac GXP.R; Pontiac 6.0L V8 / Porsche 997 GT3 Cup; Porsche 3.6L Flat-6 / Chevrolet Camaro GT.R; GM LS3 6.0L V8	Autohaus Motorsports; ZMG Construction; Rincent BTP; Forge Capital Partners; Bank of America	GT	9
Autohaus Motorsports	46	(United States) Johnny O'Connell	Pontiac GXP.R; Pontiac 6.0L V8 / Porsche 997 GT3 Cup; Porsche 3.6L Flat-6 / Chevrolet Camaro GT.R; GM LS3 6.0L V8	Autohaus Motorsports; ZMG Construction; Rincent BTP; Forge Capital Partners; Bank of America	GT	9, 12
Autohaus Motorsports	46	(United States) Jordan Taylor	Pontiac GXP.R; Pontiac 6.0L V8 / Porsche 997 GT3 Cup; Porsche 3.6L Flat-6 / Chevrolet Camaro GT.R; GM LS3 6.0L V8	Autohaus Motorsports; ZMG Construction; Rincent BTP; Forge Capital Partners; Bank of America	GT	12
Miller Barrett Racing	48	(United Kingdom) Luke Hines	Porsche 997 GT3 Cup; Porsche 3.6L Flat-6	Marquis Jet; Dietz & Watson Meats; Grand Prix Racewear; JSI; IPC; TOTAL; Wheel Enhancement	GT	1–2, 6
Miller Barrett Racing	48	(United States) Bryce Miller	Porsche 997 GT3 Cup; Porsche 3.6L Flat-6	Marquis Jet; Dietz & Watson Meats; Grand Prix Racewear; JSI; IPC; TOTAL; Wheel Enhancement	GT	1–2, 6
Miller Barrett Racing	48	(United States) Peter Ludwig	Porsche 997 GT3 Cup; Porsche 3.6L Flat-6	Marquis Jet; Dietz & Watson Meats; Grand Prix Racewear; JSI; IPC; TOTAL; Wheel Enhancement	GT	2
Miller Barrett Racing	48	(United States) Kevin Roush	Porsche 997 GT3 Cup; Porsche 3.6L Flat-6	Marquis Jet; Dietz & Watson Meats; Grand Prix Racewear; JSI; IPC; TOTAL; Wheel Enhancement	GT	2
Wil Mar Racing	52	(Italy) Giuseppe Castellano	Ferrari F430 Challenge; Ferrari 4.3L V8	Wilton Partners; XLawX; Bizrate.com; P1Groupe.com; Dorsal Friends; Ecotech Roofing; Stoll Law	GT	1
Wil Mar Racing	52	(United States) Max Schmidt	Ferrari F430 Challenge; Ferrari 4.3L V8	Wilton Partners; XLawX; Bizrate.com; P1Groupe.com; Dorsal Friends; Ecotech Roofing; Stoll Law	GT	1
Wil Mar Racing	52	(United States) Nathan Swartzbaugh	Ferrari F430 Challenge; Ferrari 4.3L V8	Wilton Partners; XLawX; Bizrate.com; P1Groupe.com; Dorsal Friends; Ecotech Roofing; Stoll Law	GT	1
Wil Mar Racing	52	(United States) Bob Michaelian	Ferrari F430 Challenge; Ferrari 4.3L V8	Wilton Partners; XLawX; Bizrate.com; P1Groupe.com; Dorsal Friends; Ecotech Roofing; Stoll Law	GT	1
Wil Mar Racing	52	(United States) Jim Michaelian	Ferrari F430 Challenge; Ferrari 4.3L V8	Wilton Partners; XLawX; Bizrate.com; P1Groupe.com; Dorsal Friends; Ecotech Roofing; Stoll Law	GT	1
NPN Racing; Level 5 Motorsports	55	(France) Christophe Bouchut	Riley Mk. XX; BMW 5.0L V8	Crown Royal Cask 16; US Bank; Spirit Jets; Drive Digital Media; SuperCar Life	DP	1–2
NPN Racing; Level 5 Motorsports	55	(United States) Scott Tucker	Riley Mk. XX; BMW 5.0L V8	Crown Royal Cask 16; US Bank; Spirit Jets; Drive Digital Media; SuperCar Life	DP	1–2
NPN Racing; Level 5 Motorsports	55	(France) Sébastien Bourdais	Riley Mk. XX; BMW 5.0L V8	Crown Royal Cask 16; US Bank; Spirit Jets; Drive Digital Media; SuperCar Life	DP	1
NPN Racing; Level 5 Motorsports	55	(France) Emmanuel Collard	Riley Mk. XX; BMW 5.0L V8	Crown Royal Cask 16; US Bank; Spirit Jets; Drive Digital Media; SuperCar Life	DP	1
NPN Racing; Level 5 Motorsports	55	(Germany) Sascha Maassen	Riley Mk. XX; BMW 5.0L V8	Crown Royal Cask 16; US Bank; Spirit Jets; Drive Digital Media; SuperCar Life	DP	1
NPN Racing; Level 5 Motorsports	95	(United States) Ryan Hunter-Reay	Riley Mk. XX; BMW 5.0L V8	Crown Royal Cask 16; US Bank; Spirit Jets; Drive Digital Media; SuperCar Life	DP	1–2
NPN Racing; Level 5 Motorsports	95	(United States) Scott Tucker	Riley Mk. XX; BMW 5.0L V8	Crown Royal Cask 16; US Bank; Spirit Jets; Drive Digital Media; SuperCar Life	DP	1–2
NPN Racing; Level 5 Motorsports	95	(France) Christophe Bouchut	Riley Mk. XX; BMW 5.0L V8	Crown Royal Cask 16; US Bank; Spirit Jets; Drive Digital Media; SuperCar Life	DP	1
NPN Racing; Level 5 Motorsports	95	(Germany) Lucas Luhr	Riley Mk. XX; BMW 5.0L V8	Crown Royal Cask 16; US Bank; Spirit Jets; Drive Digital Media; SuperCar Life	DP	1
NPN Racing; Level 5 Motorsports	95	(United Kingdom) Richard Westbrook	Riley Mk. XX; BMW 5.0L V8	Crown Royal Cask 16; US Bank; Spirit Jets; Drive Digital Media; SuperCar Life	DP	1
Bennett Racing	56	(United States) Skip Bennett	Ferrari F430 Challenge; Ferrari 4.3L V8	South River Marina & Mercruiser	GT	4
Bennett Racing	56	(United States) Mike Skeen	Ferrari F430 Challenge; Ferrari 4.3L V8	South River Marina & Mercruiser	GT	4
Stevenson Motorsports	57	(United Kingdom) Robin Liddell	Chevrolet Camaro GT.R; GM LS3 6.0L V8	Stevenson Auto; Vin Solutions; Bryan Mark Financial	GT	All
Stevenson Motorsports	57	(United States) Andrew Davis	Chevrolet Camaro GT.R; GM LS3 6.0L V8	Stevenson Auto; Vin Solutions; Bryan Mark Financial	GT	All
Stevenson Motorsports	57	(Denmark) Jan Magnussen	Chevrolet Camaro GT.R; GM LS3 6.0L V8	Stevenson Auto; Vin Solutions; Bryan Mark Financial	GT	1
Stevenson Motorsports	97	(Denmark) Jan Magnussen	Chevrolet Camaro GT.R; GM LS3 6.0L V8	Stevenson Auto; LaLa Motorsports; Bryan Mark Financial	GT	2–3, 8–9, 12
Stevenson Motorsports	97	(United States) Gunter Schaldach	Chevrolet Camaro GT.R; GM LS3 6.0L V8	Stevenson Auto; LaLa Motorsports; Bryan Mark Financial	GT	All
Stevenson Motorsports	97	(Denmark) Ronnie Bremer	Chevrolet Camaro GT.R; GM LS3 6.0L V8	Stevenson Auto; LaLa Motorsports; Bryan Mark Financial	GT	5–7, 10–11
Stevenson Motorsports	97	(United States) Matt Bell	Chevrolet Camaro GT.R; GM LS3 6.0L V8	Stevenson Auto; LaLa Motorsports; Bryan Mark Financial	GT	1
Stevenson Motorsports	97	(United States) Mike Borkowski	Chevrolet Camaro GT.R; GM LS3 6.0L V8	Stevenson Auto; LaLa Motorsports; Bryan Mark Financial	GT	1
Stevenson Motorsports	97	(United States) Joey Hand	Chevrolet Camaro GT.R; GM LS3 6.0L V8	Stevenson Auto; LaLa Motorsports; Bryan Mark Financial	GT	1
Stevenson Motorsports	97	(United States) Brady Refenning	Chevrolet Camaro GT.R; GM LS3 6.0L V8	Stevenson Auto; LaLa Motorsports; Bryan Mark Financial	GT	1
Stevenson Motorsports	97	(United States) Spencer Pumpelly	Chevrolet Camaro GT.R; GM LS3 6.0L V8	Stevenson Auto; LaLa Motorsports; Bryan Mark Financial	GT	4
Brumos Racing	59	(United States) Darren Law	Riley Mk. XI; Porsche 3.99L Flat-6	Brumos	DP	All
Brumos Racing	59	(United States) David Donohue	Riley Mk. XI; Porsche 3.99L Flat-6	Brumos	DP	All
Brumos Racing	59	(United States) Butch Leitzinger	Riley Mk. XI; Porsche 3.99L Flat-6	Brumos	DP	1, 6
Brumos Racing	59	(United States) Hurley Haywood	Riley Mk. XI; Porsche 3.99L Flat-6	Brumos	DP	1
Brumos Racing	59	(Brazil) Raphael Matos	Riley Mk. XI; Porsche 3.99L Flat-6	Brumos	DP	1
AIM Autosport	61	(United States) Burt Frisselle	Riley Mk. XI; Ford 5.0L V8	Pacific Mobile; BioSign	DP	2–12
AIM Autosport	61	(Canada) Mark Wilkins	Riley Mk. XI; Ford 5.0L V8	Pacific Mobile; BioSign	DP	2–12
The Racer's Group	63	(United States) Zak Brown	Porsche 997 GT3 Cup; Porsche 3.6L Flat-6	Future Electronics; Remington; Team Polizei; M3LRacing.com; Freescale Semiconductors	GT	1
The Racer's Group	63	(United Kingdom) Richard Dean	Porsche 997 GT3 Cup; Porsche 3.6L Flat-6	Future Electronics; Remington; Team Polizei; M3LRacing.com; Freescale Semiconductors	GT	1
The Racer's Group	63	(United States) Henri Richard	Porsche 997 GT3 Cup; Porsche 3.6L Flat-6	Future Electronics; Remington; Team Polizei; M3LRacing.com; Freescale Semiconductors	GT	1
The Racer's Group	63	(United Kingdom) Mark Thomas	Porsche 997 GT3 Cup; Porsche 3.6L Flat-6	Future Electronics; Remington; Team Polizei; M3LRacing.com; Freescale Semiconductors	GT	1
The Racer's Group	63	(United States) Rene Villeneuve	Porsche 997 GT3 Cup; Porsche 3.6L Flat-6	Future Electronics; Remington; Team Polizei; M3LRacing.com; Freescale Semiconductors	GT	1
The Racer's Group	66	(United States) Andy Lally	Porsche 997 GT3 Cup; Porsche 3.6L Flat-6	AXA	GT	1–2, 4, 6, 8–10
The Racer's Group	66	(United States) Ted Ballou	Porsche 997 GT3 Cup; Porsche 3.6L Flat-6	AXA	GT	1–2, 4
The Racer's Group	66	(United States) Patrick Flanagan	Porsche 997 GT3 Cup; Porsche 3.6L Flat-6	AXA	GT	1
The Racer's Group	66	(Germany) Wolf Henzler	Porsche 997 GT3 Cup; Porsche 3.6L Flat-6	AXA	GT	1
The Racer's Group	66	(United States) Kelly Collins	Porsche 997 GT3 Cup; Porsche 3.6L Flat-6	AXA	GT	1
The Racer's Group	66	(United States) R. J. Valentine	Porsche 997 GT3 Cup; Porsche 3.6L Flat-6	AXA	GT	8–9
The Racer's Group	66	(United States) Steven Bertheau	Porsche 997 GT3 Cup; Porsche 3.6L Flat-6	AXA	GT	10, 12
The Racer's Group	66	(United States) Spencer Pumpelly	Porsche 997 GT3 Cup; Porsche 3.6L Flat-6	AXA	GT	6, 12
The Racer's Group	71	(United States) Spencer Pumpelly	Porsche 997 GT3 Cup; Porsche 3.6L Flat-6		GT	1
The Racer's Group	71	(Germany) Timo Bernhard	Porsche 997 GT3 Cup; Porsche 3.6L Flat-6		GT	1
The Racer's Group	71	(France) Romain Dumas	Porsche 997 GT3 Cup; Porsche 3.6L Flat-6		GT	1
The Racer's Group	71	(United States) Tim George Jr.	Porsche 997 GT3 Cup; Porsche 3.6L Flat-6		GT	1
The Racer's Group	71	(United States) Bobby Labonte	Porsche 997 GT3 Cup; Porsche 3.6L Flat-6		GT	1
JLowe Racing	64	(United States) Jim Lowe	Porsche 997 GT3 Cup; Porsche 3.6L Flat-6	Siemens Gigaset	GT	1, 9
JLowe Racing	64	(United Kingdom) Tim Sugden	Porsche 997 GT3 Cup; Porsche 3.6L Flat-6	Siemens Gigaset	GT	1
JLowe Racing	64	(United States) Eric Lux	Porsche 997 GT3 Cup; Porsche 3.6L Flat-6	Siemens Gigaset	GT	1
JLowe Racing	64	(United Kingdom) James Walker	Porsche 997 GT3 Cup; Porsche 3.6L Flat-6	Siemens Gigaset	GT	1
JLowe Racing	64	(United States) Jim Pace	Porsche 997 GT3 Cup; Porsche 3.6L Flat-6	Siemens Gigaset	GT	1
JLowe Racing	64	(United States) Johannes van Overbeek	Porsche 997 GT3 Cup; Porsche 3.6L Flat-6	Siemens Gigaset	GT	9
SpeedSource	65	(Colombia) Julian Martinez	Mazda RX-8 GT; Mazda 2.0L 3-Rotor	M2 Autosport	GT	8
SpeedSource	65	(Colombia) Sebastian Martinez	Mazda RX-8 GT; Mazda 2.0L 3-Rotor	M2 Autosport	GT	8
The Racer's Group; Flying Lizard Motorsports	67	(Germany) Jörg Bergmeister	Porsche 997 GT3 Cup; Porsche 3.6L Flat-6	ShoreTel	GT	1
The Racer's Group; Flying Lizard Motorsports	67	(United States) Patrick Long	Porsche 997 GT3 Cup; Porsche 3.6L Flat-6	ShoreTel	GT	1
The Racer's Group; Flying Lizard Motorsports	67	(United States) Seth Neiman	Porsche 997 GT3 Cup; Porsche 3.6L Flat-6	ShoreTel	GT	1
The Racer's Group; Flying Lizard Motorsports	67	(United States) Johannes van Overbeek	Porsche 997 GT3 Cup; Porsche 3.6L Flat-6	ShoreTel	GT	1
The Racer's Group	67	(United States) Spencer Pumpelly	Porsche 997 GT3 Cup; Porsche 3.6L Flat-6	Fisher Industrial	GT	2, 8–9
The Racer's Group	67	(Guatemala) Enrique Saravia	Porsche 997 GT3 Cup; Porsche 3.6L Flat-6	Fisher Industrial	GT	2
The Racer's Group	67	(United States) Peter Bassett	Porsche 997 GT3 Cup; Porsche 3.6L Flat-6	Fisher Industrial	GT	8
The Racer's Group	67	(United States) Steven Bertheau	Porsche 997 GT3 Cup; Porsche 3.6L Flat-6	Fisher Industrial	GT	9
SpeedSource; Newman Wachs Racing	68	(United States) John Edwards	Mazda RX-8 GT; Mazda 2.0L 3-Rotor	Entergy; Nuclear Energy Industry; Mazdaspeed Motorsports Development	GT	2–12
SpeedSource; Newman Wachs Racing	68	(United Kingdom) Adam Christodoulou	Mazda RX-8 GT; Mazda 2.0L 3-Rotor	Entergy; Nuclear Energy Industry; Mazdaspeed Motorsports Development	GT	2–12
SpeedSource; Newman Wachs Racing	68	(United States) Tom Long	Mazda RX-8 GT; Mazda 2.0L 3-Rotor	Entergy; Nuclear Energy Industry; Mazdaspeed Motorsports Development	GT	6
SpeedSource	69	(United States) Emil Assentato	Mazda RX-8 GT; Mazda 2.0L 3-Rotor	FXDD; Mazda	GT	All
SpeedSource	69	(United States) Jeff Segal	Mazda RX-8 GT; Mazda 2.0L 3-Rotor	FXDD; Mazda	GT	All
SpeedSource	69	(United States) Nick Longhi	Mazda RX-8 GT; Mazda 2.0L 3-Rotor	FXDD; Mazda	GT	1, 6, 9
SpeedSource	69	(United States) Anthony Lazzaro	Mazda RX-8 GT; Mazda 2.0L 3-Rotor	FXDD; Mazda	GT	1, 6
SpeedSource	70	(Canada) Sylvain Tremblay	Mazda RX-8 GT; Mazda 2.0L 3-Rotor	Castrol Syntec; Mazda	GT	All
SpeedSource	70	(United States) Jonathan Bomarito	Mazda RX-8 GT; Mazda 2.0L 3-Rotor	Castrol Syntec; Mazda	GT	All
SpeedSource	70	(United Kingdom) Nick Ham	Mazda RX-8 GT; Mazda 2.0L 3-Rotor	Castrol Syntec; Mazda	GT	1
SpeedSource	70	(United States) David Haskell	Mazda RX-8 GT; Mazda 2.0L 3-Rotor	Castrol Syntec; Mazda	GT	1
Grant Racing	72	(United States) Carey Grant	Porsche 997 GT3 Cup; Porsche 3.6L Flat-6		GT	2
Grant Racing	72	(United States) Kevin Grant	Porsche 997 GT3 Cup; Porsche 3.6L Flat-6		GT	2
Grant Racing	72	(United States) Milton Grant	Porsche 997 GT3 Cup; Porsche 3.6L Flat-6		GT	2
Krohn Racing	75	(United States) Tracy Krohn	Proto-Auto Lola B08/70; Ford 5.0L V8		DP	All
Krohn Racing	75	(Sweden) Niclas Jönsson	Proto-Auto Lola B08/70; Ford 5.0L V8		DP	All
Krohn Racing	75	(Brazil) Ricardo Zonta	Proto-Auto Lola B08/70; Ford 5.0L V8		DP	1
Krohn Racing	75	(United States) Colin Braun	Proto-Auto Lola B08/70; Ford 5.0L V8		DP	1
Doran Racing	77	(South Africa) Dion von Moltke	Dallara DP01; Ford 5.0L V8	McDonald's; South African Airways; PR Newswire	DP	2–12
Doran Racing	77	(United States) Memo Gidley	Dallara DP01; Ford 5.0L V8	McDonald's; South African Airways; PR Newswire	DP	1–8
Doran Racing	77	(United States) Brad Jaeger	Dallara DP01; Ford 5.0L V8	McDonald's; South African Airways; PR Newswire	DP	1
Doran Racing	77	(Italy) Fabrizio Gollin	Dallara DP01; Ford 5.0L V8	McDonald's; South African Airways; PR Newswire	DP	1
Doran Racing	77	(United Kingdom) Derek Johnston	Dallara DP01; Ford 5.0L V8	McDonald's; South African Airways; PR Newswire	DP	1
Doran Racing	77	(United States) Matt Bell	Dallara DP01; Ford 5.0L V8	McDonald's; South African Airways; PR Newswire	DP	9, 12
Doran Racing	77	(South Africa) Mark Patterson	Dallara DP01; Ford 5.0L V8	McDonald's; South African Airways; PR Newswire	DP	10–11
Synergy Racing	81	(Netherlands) Patrick Huisman	Porsche 997 GT3 Cup; Porsche 3.6L Flat-6	Everdrive; Reynolds Development; Page Auto Group; Oil Heat; Concours Detailing	GT	4
Synergy Racing	81	(United States) David Murry	Porsche 997 GT3 Cup; Porsche 3.6L Flat-6	Everdrive; Reynolds Development; Page Auto Group; Oil Heat; Concours Detailing	GT	4
Orbit Racing	88	(United States) Guy Cosmo	Porsche 997 GT3 Cup; Porsche 3.6L Flat-6		GT	1
Orbit Racing	88	(United Kingdom) Johnny Mowlem	Porsche 997 GT3 Cup; Porsche 3.6L Flat-6		GT	1
Orbit Racing	88	(United States) John Baker	Porsche 997 GT3 Cup; Porsche 3.6L Flat-6		GT	1
Orbit Racing	88	(United States) Tom Papadopoulos	Porsche 997 GT3 Cup; Porsche 3.6L Flat-6		GT	1
Orbit Racing	88	(United States) Lance Willsey	Porsche 997 GT3 Cup; Porsche 3.6L Flat-6		GT	1
Spirit of Daytona Racing	90	(Spain) Antonio García	Coyote CC/08; Porsche 5.0L V8	Menards	DP	All
Spirit of Daytona Racing	90	(United States) Buddy Rice	Coyote CC/08; Porsche 5.0L V8	Menards	DP	All
Spirit of Daytona Racing	90	(United Kingdom) Darren Manning	Coyote CC/08; Porsche 5.0L V8	Menards	DP	1
Spirit of Daytona Racing	90	(United States) Paul Menard	Coyote CC/08; Porsche 5.0L V8	Menards	DP	1
Turner Motorsport	94	(United States) Bill Auberlen	BMW M6; BMW 5.0L V8	Turner Motorsport/Northwest	GT	1–9, 12
Turner Motorsport	94	(United States) Joey Hand	BMW M6; BMW 5.0L V8	Turner Motorsport/Northwest	GT	1–9, 12
Turner Motorsport	94	(Canada) Paul Dalla Lana	BMW M6; BMW 5.0L V8	Turner Motorsport/Northwest	GT	1–6, 8, 12
Turner Motorsport	94	(United States) Boris Said	BMW M6; BMW 5.0L V8	Turner Motorsport/Northwest	GT	2
GAINSCO/Bob Stallings Racing	99	(United States) Alex Gurney	Riley Mk. XX; Chevrolet 5.0L V8	GAINSCO	DP	All
GAINSCO/Bob Stallings Racing	99	(United States) Jon Fogarty	Riley Mk. XX; Chevrolet 5.0L V8	GAINSCO	DP	All
GAINSCO/Bob Stallings Racing	99	(United States) Jimmie Johnson	Riley Mk. XX; Chevrolet 5.0L V8	GAINSCO	DP	1, 6
GAINSCO/Bob Stallings Racing	99	(United States) Jimmy Vasser	Riley Mk. XX; Chevrolet 5.0L V8	GAINSCO	DP	1

Icon	Class
DP	Daytona Prototype
GT	Grand Touring

=== Team and driver changes ===
- Supercar Life Racing Team are developing a new BMW-Riley Daytona Prototype that will debut in the 2010 season.
- After five season with Lexus-badged Toyota engines, Chip Ganassi Racing DP team switched to BMW engines from 2010 season onwards until 2013.
- Pratt & Miller are developing some Chevrolet Camaros to replace the Pontiac GXP.Rs.
- Team Sahlen announced in September 2009, that they will be using Mazda RX-8s in the 2010 season.
- Bryce Miller and Eric Barrett have created the Miller Barrett Racing team for the 2010 season. They will be entering a Porsche 911 GT3.
- J. C. France of Brumos Racing has been suspended indefinitely after being arrested for driving under the influence of cocaine.
- Porsche is scaling back their involvement in the prototype class. Brumos Racing have confirmed they will be running only one Riley-Porsche this season, down from two last year. In addition, Penske Racing have announced they will not be returning at all in 2010, as Porsche has discontinued their support of the team, and they are expanding their IndyCar operation from two cars to three.
- Jimmie Johnson has announced he will again join the #99 GAINSCO/Bob Stallings Racing team for the Rolex 24 at Daytona. Johnson also ran in the other endurance race, the Sahlen's Six Hours at the Glen. The team began using Earnhardt Childress Racing Technologies Chevrolet engines midway during the year.
- Stevenson Motorsports have entered two Camaros for the 2010 season.

== Calendar ==
Rd	Circuit	Pole position	Fastest lap	Winner
1	Daytona International Speedway	#10 SunTrust Racing	#10 SunTrust Racing	#9 Action Express Racing
1	Daytona International Speedway	(Italy) Max Angelelli (Portugal) Pedro Lamy (United States) Ricky Taylor (South Africa) Wayne Taylor	(Italy) Max Angelelli (Portugal) Pedro Lamy (United States) Ricky Taylor (South Africa) Wayne Taylor	(Portugal) João Barbosa (United States) Terry Borcheller (United Kingdom) Ryan Dalziel (Germany) Mike Rockenfeller
1	Daytona International Speedway	#69 SpeedSource	#67 The Racer's Group/Flying Lizard Motorsports	#70 SpeedSource
1	Daytona International Speedway	(United States) Jeff Segal (United States) Emil Assentato (United States) Anthony Lazzaro (United States) Nick Longhi	(Germany) Jörg Bergmeister (United States) Patrick Long (United States) Seth Neiman (United States) Johannes van Overbeek	(United States) Jonathan Bomarito (United Kingdom) Nick Ham (United States) David Haskell (Canada) Sylvain Tremblay
2	Homestead-Miami Speedway	#59 Brumos Racing	#9 Action Express Racing	#01 Chip Ganassi Racing with Felix Sabates
2	Homestead-Miami Speedway	(United States) Darren Law (United States) David Donohue	(Portugal) João Barbosa (United States) Terry Borcheller	(United States) Scott Pruett (Mexico) Memo Rojas
2	Homestead-Miami Speedway	#07 Banner Racing	#94 Turner Motorsport	#69 SpeedSource
2	Homestead-Miami Speedway	(United States) Paul Edwards (United States) Leighton Reese (United States) Scott Russell	(United States) Bill Auberlen (Canada) Paul Dalla Lana (United States) Joey Hand	(United States) Emil Assentato (United States) Jeff Segal
3	Barber Motorsports Park	#10 SunTrust Racing	#10 SunTrust Racing	#01 Chip Ganassi Racing with Felix Sabates
3	Barber Motorsports Park	(United States) Ricky Taylor (Italy) Max Angelelli	(Italy) Max Angelelli (United States) Ricky Taylor	(United States) Scott Pruett (Mexico) Memo Rojas
3	Barber Motorsports Park	#70 SpeedSource	#70 SpeedSource	#69 SpeedSource
3	Barber Motorsports Park	(United States) Jonathan Bomarito (Canada) Sylvain Tremblay	(United States) Jonathan Bomarito (Canada) Sylvain Tremblay	(United States) Emil Assentato (United States) Jeff Segal
4	Virginia International Raceway	#01 Chip Ganassi Racing with Felix Sabates	#01 Chip Ganassi Racing with Felix Sabates	#01 Chip Ganassi Racing with Felix Sabates
4	Virginia International Raceway	(Mexico) Memo Rojas (United States) Scott Pruett	(United States) Scott Pruett (Mexico) Memo Rojas	(United States) Scott Pruett (Mexico) Memo Rojas
4	Virginia International Raceway	#30 Racers Edge Motorsports	#94 Turner Motorsport	#66 The Racer's Group
4	Virginia International Raceway	(United States) Jordan Taylor (United States) Todd Lamb	(United States) Bill Auberlen (Canada) Paul Dalla Lana (United States) Joey Hand	(United States) Andy Lally (United States) Ted Ballou
5	Lime Rock Park	#75 Krohn Racing	#10 SunTrust Racing	#10 SunTrust Racing
5	Lime Rock Park	(United States) Tracy Krohn (Sweden) Nic Jonsson	(Italy) Max Angelelli (United States) Ricky Taylor	(Italy) Max Angelelli (United States) Ricky Taylor
5	Lime Rock Park	#30 Racers Edge Motorsports	#30 Racers Edge Motorsports	#68 SpeedSource
5	Lime Rock Park	(United States) Jordan Taylor (United States) Todd Lamb	(United States) Jordan Taylor (United States) Todd Lamb	(United Kingdom) Adam Christodoulou (United States) John Edwards
6	Watkins Glen Long	#01 Chip Ganassi Racing with Felix Sabates	#01 Chip Ganassi Racing with Felix Sabates	#01 Chip Ganassi Racing with Felix Sabates
6	Watkins Glen Long	(United States) Scott Pruett (Mexico) Memo Rojas	(United States) Scott Pruett (Mexico) Memo Rojas	(United States) Scott Pruett (Mexico) Memo Rojas
6	Watkins Glen Long	#44 Magnus Racing	#41 Dempsey Racing	#66 The Racer's Group
6	Watkins Glen Long	(Netherlands) Jeroen Bleekemolen (United States) John Potter (United States) Craig Stanton	(United States) James Gue (United States) Leh Keen	(United States) Andy Lally (United States) Spencer Pumpelly
7	Mid-Ohio	#01 Chip Ganassi Racing with Felix Sabates	#8 Starworks Motorsport	#01 Chip Ganassi Racing with Felix Sabates
7	Mid-Ohio	(United States) Scott Pruett (Mexico) Memo Rojas	(United Kingdom) Ryan Dalziel (Canada) Mike Forest	(United States) Scott Pruett (Mexico) Memo Rojas
7	Mid-Ohio	#30 Racers Edge Motorsports	#07 Banner Racing	#94 Turner Motorsport
7	Mid-Ohio	(United States) Jordan Taylor (United States) Jade Buford	(United States) Paul Edwards (United States) Scott Russell	(United States) Joey Hand (United States) Bill Auberlen
8	Daytona International Speedway	#10 SunTrust Racing	#99 GAINSCO/Bob Stallings Racing	#01 Chip Ganassi Racing with Felix Sabates
8	Daytona International Speedway	(United States) Ricky Taylor (Italy) Max Angelelli	(United States) Alex Gurney (United States) Jon Fogarty	(United States) Scott Pruett (Mexico) Memo Rojas
8	Daytona International Speedway	#70 SpeedSource	#66 The Racer's Group	#66 The Racer's Group
8	Daytona International Speedway	(United States) Jonathan Bomarito (Canada) Sylvain Tremblay	(United States) Andy Lally (United States) R. J. Valentine	(United States) Andy Lally (United States) R. J. Valentine
9	New Jersey Motorsports Park	#99 GAINSCO/Bob Stallings Racing	#01 Chip Ganassi Racing with Felix Sabates	#99 GAINSCO/Bob Stallings Racing
9	New Jersey Motorsports Park	(United States) Alex Gurney (United States) Jon Fogarty	(United States) Scott Pruett (Mexico) Memo Rojas	(United States) Alex Gurney (United States) Jon Fogarty
9	New Jersey Motorsports Park	#07 Banner Racing	#57 Stevenson Motorsports	#70 SpeedSource
9	New Jersey Motorsports Park	(United States) Paul Edwards (United States) Scott Russell	(United States) Andrew Davis (United Kingdom) Robin Liddell	(United States) Jonathan Bomarito (Canada) Sylvain Tremblay
10	Watkins Glen Short	#01 Chip Ganassi Racing with Felix Sabates	#01 Chip Ganassi Racing with Felix Sabates	#01 Chip Ganassi Racing with Felix Sabates
10	Watkins Glen Short	(Mexico) Memo Rojas (United States) Scott Pruett	(United States) Scott Pruett (Mexico) Memo Rojas	(United States) Scott Pruett (Mexico) Memo Rojas
10	Watkins Glen Short	#70 SpeedSource	#07 Banner Racing	#41 Dempsey Racing
10	Watkins Glen Short	(Canada) Sylvain Tremblay (United States) Jonathan Bomarito	(United States) Paul Edwards (United States) Scott Russell	(United States) James Gue (United States) Leh Keen
11	Circuit Gilles Villeneuve	#99 GAINSCO/Bob Stallings Racing	#01 Chip Ganassi Racing with Felix Sabates	#01 Chip Ganassi Racing with Felix Sabates
11	Circuit Gilles Villeneuve	(United States) Jon Fogarty (United States) Alex Gurney	(United States) Scott Pruett (Mexico) Memo Rojas	(United States) Scott Pruett (Mexico) Memo Rojas
11	Circuit Gilles Villeneuve	#31 Marsh Racing	#07 Banner Racing	#07 Banner Racing
11	Circuit Gilles Villeneuve	(United States) Boris Said (United States) Eric Curran	(United States) Paul Edwards (United States) Scott Russell	(United States) Paul Edwards (United States) Scott Russell
12	Miller Motorsports Park	#01 Chip Ganassi Racing with Felix Sabates	#01 Chip Ganassi Racing with Felix Sabates	#01 Chip Ganassi Racing with Felix Sabates
12	Miller Motorsports Park	(Mexico) Memo Rojas (United States) Scott Pruett	(United States) Scott Pruett (Mexico) Memo Rojas	(United States) Scott Pruett (Mexico) Memo Rojas
12	Miller Motorsports Park	#31 Marsh Racing	#07 Banner Racing	#57 Stevenson Motorsports
12	Miller Motorsports Park	(United States) Eric Curran (United States) Boris Said	(United States) Paul Edwards (United States) Scott Russell	(United States) Andrew Davis (United Kingdom) Robin Liddell

== Championship standings ==
=== Daytona Prototypes ===
==== Drivers (Top 16) ====
Pos	Driver	R24	HOM	BIR	VIR	LRP	S6H	LEX	DAY	NJ	WAT	MON	SLK	Points
1	(United States) Scott Pruett	2	1	1	1	13	**1**	1	1	2	1	1	1	372
1	(Mexico) Memo Rojas	2	1	1	**1**	13	1	**1**	1	2	**1**	1	**1**	372
2	(Italy) Max Angelelli	**6**	6	12	3	1	2	9	9	3	2	3	3	332
2	(United States) Ricky Taylor	6	6	**12**	3	1	2	9	**9**	3	2	3	3	332
3	(United States) Jon Fogarty	8	3	13	5	6	6	6	7	**1**	3	**2**	2	325
4	(United States) Alex Gurney	8	3	13†	5	6	6	6	7	1	3	2	2	307
5	(United Kingdom) Ryan Dalziel	1	5	3	6	2	7	13	2	5	4	11†	5	302
6	(United States) David Donohue	11	2	5	4	10	5	8	4	9	8	4	9	299
6	(United Kingdom) Darren Law	11	**2**	5	4	10	5	8	4	9	8	4	9	299
7	(Brazil) Oswaldo Negri	5	8	2	13	7	8	2	3	8	7	8	11	298
7	(United States) John Pew	5	8	2	13	7	8	2	3	8	7	8	11	298
8	(United States) Burt Frisselle	5	4	8	2	5	4	3	11	4	11	12†	4	289
8	(Canada) Mark Wilkins	5	4	8	2	5	4	3	11	4	11	12†	4	289
9	(United States) Brian Frisselle	7	10	7	7	3	13	4	12	7	6	6	6	287
9	(Canada) Michael Valiante	7	10	7	7	3	13	4	12	7	6	6	6	287
10	(Canada) Mike Forest	12	5	3	6	2	7	13	2	5	4	11†	5	286
11	(Spain) Antonio García	13	7	6	10	8	3	5	8	10	5	5	8	286
11	(United States) Buddy Rice	13	7	6	10	8	3	5	8	10	5	5	8	286
12	(South Africa) Dion von Moltke	12	9	4	8	11	9	7	5	6	9	9	7	277
13	(Portugal) João Barbosa	1	15	10	12	4	10	10	10	11	10	10	12	260
13	(United States) Terry Borcheller	1	15	10	12	4	10	10	10	11	10	10	12	260
14	(Sweden) Niclas Jönsson	4	13	11	11	**9**	11	12	6	13	12	7	10	254
15	(United States) Tracy Krohn	4	13	11	11	9	11	12	6	13†	12	7	10	236
16	(United States) Memo Gidley	10	9	4	8	11	9	7	5					186

Colour	Result
Gold	Winner
Silver	Second place
Bronze	Third place
Green	Points classification
Blue	Non-points classification
Blue	Non-classified finish (NC)
Purple	Retired, not classified (Ret)
Red	Did not qualify (DNQ)
Red	Did not pre-qualify (DNPQ)
Black	Disqualified (DSQ)
White	Did not start (DNS)
White	Withdrew (WD)
White	Race cancelled (C)
Blank	Did not practice (DNP)
Blank	Did not arrive (DNA)
Blank	Excluded (EX)

**Bold** - Pole position
Italics - Fastest lap

===== Notes =====
- Drivers denoted by † did not complete sufficient laps in order to score points.

==== Chassis ====
Pos	Chassis	R24	HOM	BIR	VIR	LIM	S6H	LEX	DAY	NJ	WAT	MON	LEX	Points
1	(United States) Riley	1	1	1	1	2	1	1	1	1	1	1	1	392
2	(Italy) Dallara	6	6	4	3	1	2	4	5	3	2	3	3	351
3	(United States) Coyote	13	7	6	10	8	3	5	8	10	5	5	8	286
4	(United Kingdom) Lola	4	13	11	11	9	11	12	6	13	12	7	10	254
5	(United States) Crawford	14												17
Pos	Chassis	R24	HOM	BIR	VIR	LIM	S6H	LEX	DAY	NJ	WAT	MON	LEX	Points

==== Engine ====
Pos	Engine	R24	HOM	BIR	VIR	LIM	S6H	LEX	DAY	NJ	WAT	MON	LEX	Points
1	(Germany) BMW	2	1	1	1	2	1	1	1	2	1	1	1	386
2	(United States) Ford	4	4	2	2	1	2	2	3	3	2	3	3	371
3	(Germany) Porsche	1	2	5	4	4	3	5	4	9	5	4	8	329
4	(United States) Chevrolet	8	3	13	5	6	6	6	7	1	3	2	2	325
Pos	Engine	R24	HOM	BIR	VIR	LIM	S6H	LEX	DAY	NJ	WAT	MON	LEX	Points

=== Grand Touring ===
==== Drivers (Top 16) ====
Pos	Driver	R24	HOM	BIR	VIR	LRP	S6H	LEX	DAY	NJ	WAT	MON	SLK	Points
1	(United States) Emil Assentato	16	1	1	2	3	4	4	4	3	4	4	6	343
1	(United States) Jeff Segal	**16**	1	1	2	3	4	4	4	3	4	4	6	343
2	(Canada) Sylvain Tremblay	1	4	3	9	4	2	12	**6**	1	**2**	7	4	338
3	(United States) Jonathan Bomarito	1	4	**3**	9	4	2	12†	6	1	2	7	4	319
4	(United States) Andrew Davis	4	2	4	7	12	9	5	3	7	14	3	1	315
4	(United Kingdom) Robin Liddell	4	2	4	7	12	9	5	3	7	14	3	1	315
5	(United States) James Gue	14	3	7	5	2	3	10	7	4	1	6	9	311
5	(United States) Leh Keen	14	3	7	5	2	3	10	7	4	1	6	9	311
6	(United Kingdom) Adam Christodoulou		9	5	11	1	5	2	5	2	6	8	3	297
6	(United States) John Edwards		9	5	11	1	5	2	5	2	6	8	3	297
7	(United States) Andy Lally	3	8	15	1	5	1	8	1	10	9		16	281
8	(United States) Gunter Schaldach	10	15	8	10	6	8	9	9	17	5	2	2	277
9	(United States) Paul Edwards	23	**6**	14	3	5	13	7	17	**8**	3	1	14	275
10	(United States) Joe Foster	6	7	10	12	9	7	6	14	12	7	10	10	262
11	(United States) Jordan Taylor	28	17	2	**6**	**11**	6	**3**	8	9	10		11	248
12	(United States) Craig Stanton	5	14	11	4	7	**11**	14†	16	6	15	5	8	240
12	(United States) John Potter	5	14	11	4	7	11	14†	16	6	15	5	8	240
13	(United States) Bill Auberlen	8	5	6	8	8		1	2	5			5	239
14	(United States) Wayne Nonnamaker	7	10	9	13		10	11	10	13	8		7	212
15	(United States) Charles Espenlaub	6				9	7	6	14	12	7	10	10	198
16	(United States) Joey Hand	8	5			8		1	2	5			5	191

Colour	Result
Gold	Winner
Silver	Second place
Bronze	Third place
Green	Points classification
Blue	Non-points classification
Blue	Non-classified finish (NC)
Purple	Retired, not classified (Ret)
Red	Did not qualify (DNQ)
Red	Did not pre-qualify (DNPQ)
Black	Disqualified (DSQ)
White	Did not start (DNS)
White	Withdrew (WD)
White	Race cancelled (C)
Blank	Did not practice (DNP)
Blank	Did not arrive (DNA)
Blank	Excluded (EX)

**Bold** - Pole position
Italics - Fastest lap

=== Notes ===
- Drivers denoted by † did not complete sufficient laps in order to score points.

==== Engine ====
Pos	Engine	R24	HOM	BIR	VIR	LIM	S6H	LEX	DAY	NJ	WAT	MON	LEX	Points
1	(Japan) Mazda	1	1	1	2	1	2	2	4	1	1	4	3	392
2	(United States) Chevrolet	4	2	4	3	5	8	5	3	7	3	1	1	347
3	(Germany) Porsche	2	8	11	1	7	1	14	1	6	9	5	8	317
4	(Germany) BMW	8	5	6	8	8		1	2	5			5	239
5	(United States) Pontiac	24											15	32
6	(Italy) Ferrari	26			15									32
Pos	Engine	R24	HOM	BIR	VIR	LIM	S6H	LEX	DAY	NJ	WAT	MON	LEX	Points
