= Vocus =

Vocus may refer to:

- Vocus Group, an Australian communications company
- Vocus (software), a software company based in Maryland, United States
