= David Steinberg (disambiguation) =

David Steinberg (born 1942), Canadian comedian, actor, writer, director, and author

David Steinberg may also refer to:

- David Steinberg (crossword editor) (born 1996), crossword constructor and editor
- David Steinberg (journalist) (1932–2017), American journalist and president of PR Newswire
- David A. Steinberg (born 1970), American businessman
- David H. Steinberg, American writer, director, and producer for film and television
- David I. Steinberg (1928–2024), American historian
- David J. Steinberg (1965–2010), American actor
