= Cision =

American media company founded in 1867

Cision Ltd.
- Trade name: Cision
- Type: Private
- Industry: Technology
- Predecessor: Cision AB; Vocus
- Founded: 1867; 159 years ago
- Headquarters: Chicago, Illinois, United States
- Area served: Worldwide
- Key people: Guy Abramo (CEO)
- Products: Marketing and public relations software & services
- Services: Public Relations Services; PR Software; Marketing Resources; Media Contacts Database; Press Release Distribution
- Number of employees: 4,927 (2025)
- Parent: Platinum Equity
- Subsidiaries: CisionOne; PR Newswire; Brandwatch
- Website: cision.com

Cision Ltd. is a public relations and earned media software company and services provider. The company is incorporated in the Cayman Islands and headquartered in Chicago, Illinois. Cision offers a portfolio of services, including PRNewswire, PRWeb, Brandwatch, and Canada Newswire.

== Products and services ==
Cision provides public relations services to businesses. The company offers social media monitoring and engagement and media publicity services.

Cision's software is distributed in seven languages. As of June 2014, it was used by more than 16,000 annual subscribers worldwide, including commercial businesses and governmental, educational and non-profit organizations.

=== Software ===
The company offers three web-based packages: the "CisionMarketing Suite", the "Public Relations Suite" and the "Government Relations and Political Action Committee Suite". The Cision "Public Relations Suite" allows users to distribute press releases, access a database of bloggers and journalists (with no option to opt out), and monitor and analyse news and social media sites. The company's "Government Relations Suite" manages government contacts, analyses lobbying activity, facilitates communication with elected officials and provides PAC compliance software for filing reports to the FEC and state elections commissions.

=== Services ===
Through a series of acquisitions, the company provides services in PRWeb, HARO, North Social, Eureka, Vocus, and Media Insight Suite which Cision has continued to operate under the existing brand names.

PRWeb is an online press release service. PRWeb services are available through the "Vocus Marketing Suite", the "Vocus PR Suite" or as a separate service.

== History ==
Vocus was founded in 1992 by Rick Rudman and Bob Lentz in Maryland. Originally developing software to help political organizations manage donors and contacts, the company expanded into public relations software in 1997 and shifted from packaged products to internet-delivered software in 1999.

In 2005, Vocus raised $45 million through an initial public offering.

In 2011, Cision AB sold its Finnish subsidiary Oy Cision Finland AB to M-Brain Group.

In April 2014, following a net loss of $21.8 million in 2013, Vocus agreed to be acquired by private equity firm GTCR for $446.5 million. The acquisition was completed in May, and GTCR planned to combine Vocus with Cision AB.

On October 14, 2014, Cision AB and Vocus announced a "friendly merger" of the two public relations companies. Cision based in Sweden will relocate its headquarters to Chicago and so will Vocus based in Maryland, United States. The company will be based in Chicago and the combined entity will be known as Cision.

In 2015, the UK's Competition and Markets Authority raised concerns that the acquisition of Gorkana could reduce competition in the market for media contact databases. To address the concerns, the UK operations of Cision and Vocus were sold to Access Intelligence's Vuelio business in June 2015.

In 2016, Cision's acquisition of PR Newswire faced antitrust scrutiny over competition in media contact databases. As part of the approval process, PR Newswire's Agility media intelligence business was divested to Innodata subsidiary MediaMiser in July 2016.

On June 29, 2017, Cision went public via its reverse merger with special purpose acquisition company Capitol Acquisition Corporation III.

In September 2020, Cision named Abel Clark as CEO, replacing interim chief Brandon Crawley. Prior to the appointment, Clark was CEO of TruSight.

Brandon Crawley returned as interim CEO in February 2022.

In January 2023, Cali Tran joined as CEO. In June 2023, Cision launched CisionOne, an AI powered platform.

In July 2024, Dow Jones & Co. filed a lawsuit against Cision for a breach of contract. In September 2025, the companies announced that they had settled the lawsuit on confidential terms.

Guy Abramo was named CEO on January 15, 2025, replacing Cali Tran.

In January 2025, Bloomberg News reported that negotiations between Cision and a group of lenders over a debt restructuring had broken down after disagreements over proposed debt-exchange terms. In April, a Cision affiliate arranged a $250 million lifeline.

== Acquisitions ==
Date	Company	Details
August 2006	PRWeb	Vocus acquired the online press release distribution service for $28 million in cash and stock.
June 2010	Help a Reporter Out (HARO)	Vocus acquired the service connecting journalists with potential sources.
February 2011	Engine 140	Vocus acquired the developer of Twitter marketing software.
February 2011	North Social	Vocus acquired the Facebook marketing application developer for $7 million in cash, with potential additional earnout payments.
February 2012	iContact	Vocus acquired the email marketing software company for $169 million in cash and stock.
15 September 2014	Visible Technologies	Social media analytics company; Cision announced its acquisition.
2015	Gorkana	UK company offering media monitoring, journalist databases and analysis services.
March 2015	Viralheat	Social media monitoring and sentiment analysis software introduced in 2009. The developer raised $4.25 million in venture capital in 2011. A 2013 review by Network World praised its low cost and ease of use but found its reporting and analytics limited. Cision acquired the 25-person company to expand its social media offerings.
15 December 2015	PRNewswire	Cision agreed to acquire the company from UBM plc for $841 million (approximately £575 million).
2017–2018	PRIME Research	Cision agreed to acquire the company on 26 December 2017 and completed the acquisition on 24 January 2018.
31 January 2020	Cision Ltd.	Acquired by Platinum Equity for $2.7 billion, returning Cision to private ownership.
February 2021	Brandwatch	Cision announced the acquisition for $450 million.
April 2022	Streem	Australia-based real-time media monitoring company.
November 2022	Factmata	Media monitoring and analytics technology company.
