= David Steinberg (journalist) =

American journalist

- Born: 1932; The Bronx, New York, U.S.
- Died: March 8, 2017 (aged 85)
- Education: New York City College
- Occupation: Journalist
- Employers: New York Herald Tribune; PR Newswire
- Relatives: Aaron Schroeder (brother-in-law)
- Awards: Gerald Loeb Award; 1958

David Steinberg (1932 – March 8, 2017) was a journalist for the New York Herald Tribune and president of PR Newswire. He received the first distinguished business journalism award for newspapers in 1958.

== Early life ==
Steinberg was born to Rosalie and Harry Steinberg in the Bronx, New York, in 1932. He had a sister named Abby. Steinberg attended DeWitt Clinton High School in the Bronx and graduated from the City College of New York (CCNY) in 1953.

== Career ==
=== New York Herald Tribune ===
Steinberg started working for the New York Herald Tribune in junior high school as a messenger collecting hand-written stock quotes for the newspaper's financial statisticians. In college, he was the Tribune's college correspondent for CCNY. He became a copy editor in the business and financial news department before graduating. He was the newspaper's business editor by 1956.

Writing for the Tribune, Steinberg traveled extensively and interviewed heads of state, including Fidel Castro.

In 1958, Steinberg was honored with one of the first two Gerald Loeb Awards, the first awards for distinguished business and financial journalism.

=== New York Report ===
During the 1962–1963 New York City newspaper strike, Steinberg took a temporary job as the financial editor for the New York Report, a newspaper published during the strike by the owners of Il Progresso Italo-Americano, an Italian-language newspaper. Steinberg convinced PR Newswire to provide their newswire receiver so that he could report financial news without reporters.

=== PR Newswire ===
PR Newswire founder Herb Muschel, impressed by Steinberg's use of his service during the strike, recruited Steinberg for a management position. He joined the company after the strike.

Steinberg continued as the vice president and chief of operations after the company was acquired by Western Union in 1970. He became president of the company in 1976.

His contributions to the company included being a major architect of the company's international network. During his tenure as president, the service became a state-of-the-art communications network with 700 employees.

Steinberg retired in 1992. He continued as vice chairman of the company. He served as chairman of Canada Newswire until 2002.

== Personal life ==
Steinberg and his wife Anne had two sons, Howard and Michael.

His sister, Abby, was a record company representative who married songwriter and music publisher Aaron Schroeder on October 31, 1967.

Rosalie, Steinberg's mother, died in 1979.

Steinberg died on March 8, 2017, from surgery complications.

== Awards ==
- 1958: Gerald Loeb Award for Newspapers

== Professional affiliations ==
- Governor of the New York Financial Writers Association
- President of the World Trade Writers Association
- Member of the Deadline Chapter of Sigma Delta Chi
- Member of the Society of Professional Journalists
- Member of The Silurians Press Club
