= CNW Group =

Commercial press release service, founded 1960

CNW Group Ltd.
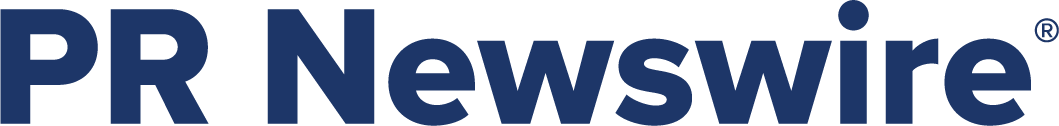
- Industry: Communication
- Founded: 1960 (as Canada News Wire)
- Founder: Joseph Adair Porter Clark
- Fate: Acquired by PR Newswire in 2013
- Headquarters: Toronto, Ontario, Canada
- Products: Press release services
- Parent: Cision
- Website: www.newswire.ca

Canada Newswire (CNW), is a commercial press release service. Founded in Canada in 1960, it expanded into CNW Group Ltd., which was acquired by American company PR Newswire in 2013, continuing operations as its Canada Newswire subsidiary. PR Newswire which purchased by American company Cision in 2016 and operated as a subsidiary; since 2021, when PR Newswire was merged into Cision, that company markets its press release services in Canada billed as being "powered by Canada Newswire". The CNW service is offered stand-alone or as part Cision Communications Cloud platform for PR professionals.

== History ==
CNW was founded in 1960 as Canada News Wire, by Joseph Adair Porter Clark (1921–2013) who became CEO and President of the news service. Clark is the father of television journalist Tom Clark.

CNW originally delivered text news releases to news media outlets on behalf of paying clients. This model expanded over time to include the provision of ancillary services required by investor relations and public relations professionals, including translation, photography, webcasts, media databases and media monitoring.

Canada Newswire distribution switched to using XHTML instead of ANPA-1312, allowing for more formatting of releases. In 2003, CNW entered into a commercial endorsed deal with TSX for its newswire and webcast services through a paid sponsorship agreement.

CNW was acquired by US-based PR Newswire in 2013. PR Newswire was subsequently acquired by Cision in 2016. Cision was most recently acquired by Platinum Equity, announced October 22, 2019.

On March 19, 2021, Business Insider reported Cision may be looking to spin off its Newswire unit.
