= 2010 24 Hours of Daytona =

| Previous: 2009 | Next: 2011 |
Index: Races | Winners

Track map of Daytona International Speedway

The 2010 Rolex 24 at Daytona was the 48th running of the Rolex 24 at Daytona and was the first round of the 2010 Rolex Sports Car Series season. It took place between January 30–31, 2010.

== Rule changes ==
- With the increased field size for the 24 Hours of Daytona as compared to other events in the season, some full-time teams had expressed concern that a poor finish in the race could be a serious detriment in their pursuit of the points championship. In response, the sanctioning body decided to place a minimum on the points a driver/team will receive in the race. Thus, any driver/team finishing 15th or worse in class will receive 15th place points (16 points).

== Results ==
- The Daytona Prototype Action Express Racing Riley-Porsche took the overall win with drivers João Barbosa, Terry Borcheller, Mike Rockenfeller, and Ryan Dalziel. This was unusual since the Riley-Porsche was powered by a Porsche Cayenne SUV based 5.0 liter V8. Porsche refused to develop the V8 for Grand-Am competition and was, instead, built by the Texas-based Lozano Brothers. Since it was not officially sanctioned by Porsche, the company will not technically claim the win.
- Second place in the prototype class was one of the two Chip Ganassi Racing cars. Level 5 Racing's Riley-BMW's finished third overall while the SpeedSource Castrol Mazda RX-8 placed first in the GT class for their 2 win in 3 years for the S. Florida based team, with drivers Sylvain Tremblay, David Haskell, Nick Ham, and Jonathan Bomarito.
- Rockenfeller eventually became the first driver since 1988 to win both the 24 Hours of Daytona and the 24 Hours of Le Mans in the same season, with his win aboard an Audi R15 TDI plus (#9 with Timo Bernhard and Romain Dumas) setting a new Le Mans distance record (race report); the Dutch Jan Lammers and the British Andy Wallace of Tom Walkinshaw Racing were the last two drivers to do the same feat.

== Race results ==
Class winners in bold.

| Pos | Class | No | Team | Drivers | Chassis | Laps |
| Pos | Class | No | Team | Drivers | Engine | Laps |
|---|---|---|---|---|---|---|
| 1 | **DP** | **9** | **(United States) Action Express Racing** | **(Portugal) João Barbosa (United States) Terry Borcheller (United Kingdom) Ryan Dalziel (Germany) Mike Rockenfeller** | **Riley Mk. XI** | **755** |
| 1 | **DP** | **9** | **(United States) Action Express Racing** | **(Portugal) João Barbosa (United States) Terry Borcheller (United Kingdom) Ryan Dalziel (Germany) Mike Rockenfeller** | Porsche 5.0L V8 | **755** |
| 2 | DP | 01 | (United States) Chip Ganassi Racing with Felix Sabates | (Italy) Max Papis (United States) Scott Pruett (Mexico) Memo Rojas (United Kingdom) Justin Wilson | Riley Mk. XI | 755 |
| 2 | DP | 01 | (United States) Chip Ganassi Racing with Felix Sabates | (Italy) Max Papis (United States) Scott Pruett (Mexico) Memo Rojas (United Kingdom) Justin Wilson | BMW 5.0L V8 | 755 |
| 3 | DP | 95 | (United States) Level 5 Motorsports | (France) Christophe Bouchut (United States) Ryan Hunter-Reay (Germany) Lucas Luhr (United States) Scott Tucker (United Kingdom) Richard Westbrook | Riley Mk. XI | 751 |
| 3 | DP | 95 | (United States) Level 5 Motorsports | (France) Christophe Bouchut (United States) Ryan Hunter-Reay (Germany) Lucas Luhr (United States) Scott Tucker (United Kingdom) Richard Westbrook | BMW 5.0L V8 | 751 |
| 4 | DP | 75 | (United States) Krohn Racing | (United States) Colin Braun (Sweden) Niclas Jönsson (United States) Tracy Krohn (Brazil) Ricardo Zonta | Proto-Auto Lola B08/70 | 735 |
| 4 | DP | 75 | (United States) Krohn Racing | (United States) Colin Braun (Sweden) Niclas Jönsson (United States) Tracy Krohn (Brazil) Ricardo Zonta | Ford 5.0L V8 | 735 |
| 5 | DP | 60 | (United States) Michael Shank Racing | (United States) Burt Frisselle (Brazil) Oswaldo Negri Jr. (United States) John Pew (Canada) Mark Wilkins | Riley Mk. XI | 726 |
| 5 | DP | 60 | (United States) Michael Shank Racing | (United States) Burt Frisselle (Brazil) Oswaldo Negri Jr. (United States) John Pew (Canada) Mark Wilkins | Ford 5.0L V8 | 726 |
| 6 | DP | 10 | (United States) SunTrust Racing | (Italy) Max Angelelli (Portugal) Pedro Lamy (United States) Ricky Taylor (South Africa) Wayne Taylor | Dallara DP01 | 711 |
| 6 | DP | 10 | (United States) SunTrust Racing | (Italy) Max Angelelli (Portugal) Pedro Lamy (United States) Ricky Taylor (South Africa) Wayne Taylor | Ford 5.0L V8 | 711 |
| 7 DNF | DP | 6 | (United States) Michael Shank Racing | (United States) A. J. Allmendinger (United States) Brian Frisselle (United States) Mark Patterson (Canada) Michael Valiante | Riley Mk. XI | 707 |
| 7 DNF | DP | 6 | (United States) Michael Shank Racing | (United States) A. J. Allmendinger (United States) Brian Frisselle (United States) Mark Patterson (Canada) Michael Valiante | Ford 5.0L V8 | 707 |
| 8 | **GT** | **70** | **(United States) SpeedSource** | **(United States) Jonathan Bomarito (United States) Nick Ham (United States) David Haskell (Canada) Sylvain Tremblay** | **Mazda RX-8** | **707** |
| 8 | **GT** | **70** | **(United States) SpeedSource** | **(United States) Jonathan Bomarito (United States) Nick Ham (United States) David Haskell (Canada) Sylvain Tremblay** | Mazda 2.0L 3-Rotor | **707** |
| 9 | GT | 67 | (United States) The Racer's Group/Flying Lizard Motorsports | (Germany) Jörg Bergmeister (United States) Patrick Long (United States) Seth Neiman (United States) Johannes van Overbeek | Porsche 997 GT3 Cup | 703 |
| 9 | GT | 67 | (United States) The Racer's Group/Flying Lizard Motorsports | (Germany) Jörg Bergmeister (United States) Patrick Long (United States) Seth Neiman (United States) Johannes van Overbeek | Porsche 3.6L Flat-6 | 703 |
| 10 | GT | 66 | (United States) The Racer's Group | (United States) Ted Ballou (United States) Kelly Collins (United States) Patrick Flanagan (Germany) Wolf Henzler (United States) Andy Lally | Porsche 997 GT3 Cup | 691 |
| 10 | GT | 66 | (United States) The Racer's Group | (United States) Ted Ballou (United States) Kelly Collins (United States) Patrick Flanagan (Germany) Wolf Henzler (United States) Andy Lally | Porsche 3.6L Flat-6 | 691 |
| 11 | GT | 57 | (United States) Stevenson Motorsports | (United States) Andrew Davis (United Kingdom) Robin Liddell (Denmark) Jan Magnussen | Chevrolet Camaro GT.R | 683 |
| 11 | GT | 57 | (United States) Stevenson Motorsports | (United States) Andrew Davis (United Kingdom) Robin Liddell (Denmark) Jan Magnussen | GM 6.0L V8 | 683 |
| 12 | GT | 44 | (United States) Magnus Racing | (Netherlands) Jeroen Bleekemolen (Austria) Richard Lietz (United States) John Potter (United States) Craig Stanton | Porsche 997 GT3 Cup | 683 |
| 12 | GT | 44 | (United States) Magnus Racing | (Netherlands) Jeroen Bleekemolen (Austria) Richard Lietz (United States) John Potter (United States) Craig Stanton | Porsche 3.6L Flat-6 | 683 |
| 13 | GT | 40 | (United States) Dempsey Racing | (United States) Patrick Dempsey (United States) Charles Espenlaub (United States) Joe Foster (Canada) Scott Maxwell | Mazda RX-8 | 682 |
| 13 | GT | 40 | (United States) Dempsey Racing | (United States) Patrick Dempsey (United States) Charles Espenlaub (United States) Joe Foster (Canada) Scott Maxwell | Mazda 2.0L 3-Rotor | 682 |
| 14 | GT | 43 | (United States) Team Sahlen | (United States) Joe Nonnamaker (United States) Wayne Nonnamaker (United States) Will Nonnamaker (United States) Joe Sahlen | Mazda RX-8 | 682 |
| 14 | GT | 43 | (United States) Team Sahlen | (United States) Joe Nonnamaker (United States) Wayne Nonnamaker (United States) Will Nonnamaker (United States) Joe Sahlen | Mazda 2.0L 3-Rotor | 682 |
| 15 | GT | 94 | (United States) Turner Motorsport | (United States) Bill Auberlen (Canada) Paul Dalla Lana (United States) Joey Hand (United States) Boris Said | BMW M6 | 675 |
| 15 | GT | 94 | (United States) Turner Motorsport | (United States) Bill Auberlen (Canada) Paul Dalla Lana (United States) Joey Hand (United States) Boris Said | BMW 5.0L V10 | 675 |
| 16 | GT | 71 | (United States) The Racer's Group | (Germany) Timo Bernhard (France) Romain Dumas (United States) Tim George Jr. (United States) Bobby Labonte (United States) Spencer Pumpelly | Porsche 997 GT3 Cup | 668 |
| 16 | GT | 71 | (United States) The Racer's Group | (Germany) Timo Bernhard (France) Romain Dumas (United States) Tim George Jr. (United States) Bobby Labonte (United States) Spencer Pumpelly | Porsche 3.6L Flat-6 | 668 |
| 17 | GT | 97 | (United States) Stevenson Motorsports | (United States) Matt Bell (United States) Mike Borkowski (United States) Brady Refenning (United States) Gunter Schaldach | Chevrolet Camaro GT.R | 661 |
| 17 | GT | 97 | (United States) Stevenson Motorsports | (United States) Matt Bell (United States) Mike Borkowski (United States) Brady Refenning (United States) Gunter Schaldach | GM 6.0L V8 | 661 |
| 18 | GT | 32 | (United States) Corsa Team PR1 | (United States) Rob Finlay (United States) Max Hyatt (United States) Thomas Merrill (United States) Jeff Westphal | BMW M6 | 657 |
| 18 | GT | 32 | (United States) Corsa Team PR1 | (United States) Rob Finlay (United States) Max Hyatt (United States) Thomas Merrill (United States) Jeff Westphal | BMW 5.0L V10 | 657 |
| 19 | GT | 23 | (United States) Alex Job Racing | (United States) Jack Baldwin (Argentina) Claudio Burtin (Germany) Dominik Farnbacher (United States) Mitch Pagerey (Austria) Martin Ragginger | Porsche 997 GT3 Cup | 656 |
| 19 | GT | 23 | (United States) Alex Job Racing | (United States) Jack Baldwin (Argentina) Claudio Burtin (Germany) Dominik Farnbacher (United States) Mitch Pagerey (Austria) Martin Ragginger | Porsche 3.6L Flat-6 | 656 |
| 20 | GT | 22 | (United States) Bullet Racing | (Canada) Ross Bentley (Canada) Sean McIntosh (Canada) Kees Nierop (Hong Kong) Darryl O'Young | Porsche 997 GT3 Cup | 632 |
| 20 | GT | 22 | (United States) Bullet Racing | (Canada) Ross Bentley (Canada) Sean McIntosh (Canada) Kees Nierop (Hong Kong) Darryl O'Young | Porsche 3.6L Flat-6 | 632 |
| 21 DNF | DP | 99 | (United States) GAINSCO/Bob Stallings Racing | (United States) Jon Fogarty (United States) Alex Gurney (United States) Jimmie Johnson (United States) Jimmy Vasser | Riley Mk. XI | 630 |
| 21 DNF | DP | 99 | (United States) GAINSCO/Bob Stallings Racing | (United States) Jon Fogarty (United States) Alex Gurney (United States) Jimmie Johnson (United States) Jimmy Vasser | Chevrolet 5.0L V8 | 630 |
| 22 | GT | 41 | (United States) Dempsey Racing/Team Seattle | (United States) James Gue (United States) Leh Keen (United States) Don Kitch Jr. (Canada) Dave Lacey | Mazda RX-8 | 620 |
| 22 | GT | 41 | (United States) Dempsey Racing/Team Seattle | (United States) James Gue (United States) Leh Keen (United States) Don Kitch Jr. (Canada) Dave Lacey | Mazda 2.0L 3-Rotor | 620 |
| 23 DNF | DP | 55 | (Canada) Crown Royal/NPN Racing | (France) Christophe Bouchut (France) Sébastien Bourdais (France) Emmanuel Collard (Germany) Sascha Maassen (United States) Scott Tucker | Riley Mk. XI | 619 |
| 23 DNF | DP | 55 | (Canada) Crown Royal/NPN Racing | (France) Christophe Bouchut (France) Sébastien Bourdais (France) Emmanuel Collard (Germany) Sascha Maassen (United States) Scott Tucker | BMW 5.0L V8 | 619 |
| 24 | DP | 77 | (United States) Doran Racing | (United States) Memo Gidley (Italy) Fabrizio Gollin (United States) Brad Jaeger (United Kingdom) Derek Johnston | Dallara DP01 | 612 |
| 24 | DP | 77 | (United States) Doran Racing | (United States) Memo Gidley (Italy) Fabrizio Gollin (United States) Brad Jaeger (United Kingdom) Derek Johnston | Ford 5.0L V8 | 612 |
| 25 | GT | 14 | (United States) Autometrics Motorsports | (United States) Cory Friedman (United States) Glen Gatlin (United States) Daniel Graeff (United States) Seth Thomas (United States) Ron Yarab Jr. | Porsche 997 GT3 Cup | 611 |
| 25 | GT | 14 | (United States) Autometrics Motorsports | (United States) Cory Friedman (United States) Glen Gatlin (United States) Daniel Graeff (United States) Seth Thomas (United States) Ron Yarab Jr. | Porsche 3.6L Flat-6 | 611 |
| 26 DNF | DP | 59 | (United States) Brumos Racing | (United States) David Donohue (United States) Hurley Haywood (United States) Darren Law (United States) Butch Leitzinger (Brazil) Raphael Matos | Riley Mk. XI | 582 |
| 26 DNF | DP | 59 | (United States) Brumos Racing | (United States) David Donohue (United States) Hurley Haywood (United States) Darren Law (United States) Butch Leitzinger (Brazil) Raphael Matos | Porsche 4.0L Flat-6 | 582 |
| 27 DNF | DP | 7 | (United States) Starworks Motorsport | (Canada) Mike Forest (United Kingdom) Ian James (United States) Bill Lester (South Africa) Dion von Moltke | Riley Mk. XI | 549 |
| 27 DNF | DP | 7 | (United States) Starworks Motorsport | (Canada) Mike Forest (United Kingdom) Ian James (United States) Bill Lester (South Africa) Dion von Moltke | BMW 5.0L V8 | 549 |
| 28 DNF | GT | 69 | (United States) SpeedSource | (United States) Emil Assentato (United States) Anthony Lazzaro (United States) Nick Longhi (United States) Jeff Segal | Mazda RX-8 | 488 |
| 28 DNF | GT | 69 | (United States) SpeedSource | (United States) Emil Assentato (United States) Anthony Lazzaro (United States) Nick Longhi (United States) Jeff Segal | Mazda 2.0L 3-Rotor | 488 |
| 29 DNF | GT | 88 | (United States) Orbit Racing | (United States) John Baker (United States) Guy Cosmo (United Kingdom) Johnny Mowlem (United States) Tom Papadopoulos (United States) Lance Willsey | Porsche 997 GT3 Cup | 444 |
| 29 DNF | GT | 88 | (United States) Orbit Racing | (United States) John Baker (United States) Guy Cosmo (United Kingdom) Johnny Mowlem (United States) Tom Papadopoulos (United States) Lance Willsey | Porsche 3.6L Flat-6 | 444 |
| 30 DNF | GT | 48 | (United States) Miller Barrett Racing | (United Kingdom) Luke Hines (United States) Peter Ludwig (United States) Bryce Miller (United States) Kevin Roush | Porsche 997 GT3 Cup | 411 |
| 30 DNF | GT | 48 | (United States) Miller Barrett Racing | (United Kingdom) Luke Hines (United States) Peter Ludwig (United States) Bryce Miller (United States) Kevin Roush | Porsche 3.6L Flat-6 | 411 |
| 31 DNF | GT | 18 | (United States) The Racer's Group/Guardian Angel | (United States) Bob Doyle (United States) Bruce Ledoux (United States) David Quinlan (United States) Tom Sheehan (United States) Dan Watkins | Porsche 997 GT3 Cup | 386 |
| 31 DNF | GT | 18 | (United States) The Racer's Group/Guardian Angel | (United States) Bob Doyle (United States) Bruce Ledoux (United States) David Quinlan (United States) Tom Sheehan (United States) Dan Watkins | Porsche 3.6L Flat-6 | 386 |
| 32 DNF | DP | 90 | (United States) Spirit of Daytona Racing | (Spain) Antonio García (United Kingdom) Darren Manning (United States) Paul Menard (United States) Buddy Rice | Coyote CC/09 | 346 |
| 32 DNF | DP | 90 | (United States) Spirit of Daytona Racing | (Spain) Antonio García (United Kingdom) Darren Manning (United States) Paul Menard (United States) Buddy Rice | Porsche 5.0L V8 | 346 |
| 33 | GT | 63 | (United States) The Racer's Group | (United States) Zak Brown (United Kingdom) Richard Dean (United States) Henri Richard (Canada) Mark Thomas (United States) Rene Villeneuve | Porsche 997 GT3 Cup | 335 |
| 33 | GT | 63 | (United States) The Racer's Group | (United States) Zak Brown (United Kingdom) Richard Dean (United States) Henri Richard (Canada) Mark Thomas (United States) Rene Villeneuve | Porsche 3.6L Flat-6 | 335 |
| 34 DNF | DP | 2 | (United States) Beyer Racing | (United States) Jared Beyer (United States) Dane Cameron (United States) Romeo Kapudija (Germany) Jan-Dirk Lueders (United States) Cort Wagner | Crawford DP08 | 319 |
| 34 DNF | DP | 2 | (United States) Beyer Racing | (United States) Jared Beyer (United States) Dane Cameron (United States) Romeo Kapudija (Germany) Jan-Dirk Lueders (United States) Cort Wagner | Chevrolet 5.0L V8 | 319 |
| 35 DNF | GT | 19 | (United States) MCM/Black Flag Racing | (Republic of Ireland) Sean Paul Breslin (Italy) Riccardo Romagnoli (Italy) Diego Romanini (United States) Jason Vinkemulder | Chevrolet Corvette C6 | 316 |
| 35 DNF | GT | 19 | (United States) MCM/Black Flag Racing | (Republic of Ireland) Sean Paul Breslin (Italy) Riccardo Romagnoli (Italy) Diego Romanini (United States) Jason Vinkemulder | GM 6.0L V8 | 316 |
| 36 DNF | GT | 20 | (United States) Matt Connolly Motorsports | (France) Christophe Lapierre (Netherlands) Jos Menten (Finland) Markus Palttala (Netherlands) Oskar Slingerland | Porsche 997 GT3 Cup | 276 |
| 36 DNF | GT | 20 | (United States) Matt Connolly Motorsports | (France) Christophe Lapierre (Netherlands) Jos Menten (Finland) Markus Palttala (Netherlands) Oskar Slingerland | Porsche 3.6L Flat-6 | 276 |
| 37 DNF | DP | 02 | (United States) Chip Ganassi Racing with Felix Sabates | (New Zealand) Scott Dixon (United Kingdom) Dario Franchitti (United States) Jamie McMurray (Colombia) Juan Pablo Montoya | Riley Mk. XI | 249 |
| 37 DNF | DP | 02 | (United States) Chip Ganassi Racing with Felix Sabates | (New Zealand) Scott Dixon (United Kingdom) Dario Franchitti (United States) Jamie McMurray (Colombia) Juan Pablo Montoya | BMW 5.0L V8 | 249 |
| 38 DNF | GT | 07 | (United States) Godstone Ranch Motorsports | (United States) Paul Edwards (United States) Davy Jones (United States) John McCutchen (United States) Leighton Reese (United States) Scott Russell | Chevrolet Corvette C6 | 201 |
| 38 DNF | GT | 07 | (United States) Godstone Ranch Motorsports | (United States) Paul Edwards (United States) Davy Jones (United States) John McCutchen (United States) Leighton Reese (United States) Scott Russell | GM 6.0L V8 | 201 |
| 39 | GT | 21 | (United States) Matt Connolly Motorsports | (United States) Jim Briody (El Salvador) Toto Lassally (Italy) Gabrio Rosa (Colombia) Tomas Steuer (United States) Spencer Trenery | Pontiac GTO.R | 153 |
| 39 | GT | 21 | (United States) Matt Connolly Motorsports | (United States) Jim Briody (El Salvador) Toto Lassally (Italy) Gabrio Rosa (Colombia) Tomas Steuer (United States) Spencer Trenery | GM 6.0L V8 | 153 |
| 40 DNF | GT | 46 | (United States) Autohaus Motorsports | (United States) Peter Collins (France) Romain Iannetta (United States) Shane Lewis (United States) Richard Zahn | Pontiac GXP.R | 125 |
| 40 DNF | GT | 46 | (United States) Autohaus Motorsports | (United States) Peter Collins (France) Romain Iannetta (United States) Shane Lewis (United States) Richard Zahn | GM 6.0L V8 | 125 |
| 41 DNF | GT | 52 | (United States) Wil Mar Racing | (Italy) Joe Castellano (United States) Bob Michaelian (United States) Jim Michaelian (United States) Jay Wilton (Italy) Filippo Marchino (United States) Nathan Swatzbaugh | Ferrari 430 Challenge | 112 |
| 41 DNF | GT | 52 | (United States) Wil Mar Racing | (Italy) Joe Castellano (United States) Bob Michaelian (United States) Jim Michaelian (United States) Jay Wilton (Italy) Filippo Marchino (United States) Nathan Swatzbaugh | Ferrari 4.3L V8 | 112 |
| 42 DNF | GT | 64 | (United States) JLowe Racing | (United States) Jim Lowe (United States) Eric Lux (United States) Jim Pace (United Kingdom) Tim Sugden (United Kingdom) James Walker | Porsche 997 GT3 Cup | 100 |
| 42 DNF | GT | 64 | (United States) JLowe Racing | (United States) Jim Lowe (United States) Eric Lux (United States) Jim Pace (United Kingdom) Tim Sugden (United Kingdom) James Walker | Porsche 3.6L Flat-6 | 100 |
| 43 DNF | GT | 30 | (United States) Racer's Edge Motorsports | (United States) Glenn Bocchino (United States) Jade Buford (United States) John Edwards (United States) Todd Lamb (United States) Jordan Taylor | Mazda RX-8 | 69 |
| 43 DNF | GT | 30 | (United States) Racer's Edge Motorsports | (United States) Glenn Bocchino (United States) Jade Buford (United States) John Edwards (United States) Todd Lamb (United States) Jordan Taylor | Mazda 2.0L 3-Rotor | 69 |
| 44 DNF | GT | 42 | (United States) Team Sahlen | (United States) Joe Nonnamaker (United States) Wayne Nonnamaker (United States) Will Nonnamaker (United States) Joe Sahlen | Mazda RX-8 | 27 |
| 44 DNF | GT | 42 | (United States) Team Sahlen | (United States) Joe Nonnamaker (United States) Wayne Nonnamaker (United States) Will Nonnamaker (United States) Joe Sahlen | Mazda 2.0L 3-Rotor | 27 |
| DNS | GT | 08 | (United States) Sigalsport | (United States) Fred Poordad (United States) Gene Sigal (United States) Rusty West (United States) Roger Yasukawa | Ferrari F430 Challenge | - |
| DNS | GT | 08 | (United States) Sigalsport | (United States) Fred Poordad (United States) Gene Sigal (United States) Rusty West (United States) Roger Yasukawa | Ferrari 4.3L V8 | - |

Rolex Sports Car Series
| Previous race: None | 2010 season | Next race: Grand Prix of Miami |
