= Herb Muschel =

American publisher

- Born: Herbert Muschel; Lower East Side, Manhattan, U.S
- Died: November 1, 2003 (aged 85); New York City, New York, U.S
- Education: New York University
- Known for: Founding PR Newswire

Herbert Muschel (died November 1, 2003) was an American businessman and publisher who founded the newspaper PR Newswire.

== Early life and education ==
Muschel was born in the Lower East Side in Manhattan. He graduated at New York University with a degree in journalism.

== Career ==
In 1954, he founded PR Newswire, which was a cutting edge service that once distributed corporate financial news at a time when the Federal Communications Commission allowed only AT&T and Western Union to send printed messages to a third person. In 1971, Muschel sold PR Newswire to Western Union.

He died on November 1, 2003, at 85 in New York City.
