= Peter Basset =

English biographer of Henry V

Peter Basset (fl. 1415–1437), also known as Petrus Bassetus, was an English soldier, historian, biographer of Henry V of England, and co-author of an incomplete account in French of English activities in France between the capture of Harfleur in September 1415, and the raising of the siege of Orléans in May 1429. Several lost historic works and biographies have been attributed to him, but none of his manuscripts appear to have survived into the modern era.

== Background ==
Basset is described in William Worcester's preface to the chronicle in College of Arms, MS 9, as an esquire of the English nation who had served in arms in France for 35 years under Henry V, John of Lancaster, and several other royal lieutenants.

Several Peter Bassets occur in the records of English armies in France in the years after 1415. Given the link with John Fastolf, it seems highly likely that the historian was the Peter Basset who stood bail in 1426 for the procureur of Pirmil, when the latter had been flung into prison by the captain of Isle-sous-Brûlon in Maine, which lay near to Christopher Hanson's garrison of Sainte-Suzanne, and who was one of the men sent to reinforce Fastolf's garrison of Alençon in October 1429.

He is later found among reinforcements at Essay in March 1431, and served at the siege of Saint-Célerin in 1432, rejoining the garrison of Alençon in January 1434, and remaining there until at least December 1437. No record has been found of his service in Fastolf's English administration.

== Literary works ==
Basset is stated by John Bale to have been the chamberlain and intimate friend of Henry V, and to have written in English a detailed and interesting life of his patron under the title of Acta Regis Henrici Quinti. Thomas Tanner ascribes to Basset another historical work, called De Actis Armorum et Conquestus Regni Franciæ ducatus Normanniæ, ducatus Alenconiæ, ducatus Andegaviæ et Cenomanniæ, etc. Ad nobilem virum Johannem Falstolf, baronem de Cyllyequotem.

Edward Hall, the chronicler of the Wars of the Roses, writing before 1542, mentions "Ihon Basset" among the English writers whose works he had consulted, and this reference almost certainly applies to Peter Basset, whom John Pitts likewise miscalls "John". Hall quotes "Peter Basset, esquire, which at the time of his death was his chamberlain," as his authority for the statement that Henry V "died of a plurisis." Thomas Hearne, in the preface to his edition of Thomas Elmham's Vita et Gesta Henrici V, describes, among the extant accounts of Henry V's actions in France, a work in manuscript entitled Petri Basseti et Christophori Hansoni adversaria.

=== Manuscripts location ===
Both Tanner and Hearne speak of Basset's historical works as lying in manuscript at the College of Arms, but no distinct mention of them is made in W. H. Black's catalogue of the chief historical manuscripts which are now preserved there. William Dunn Macray is of opinion that an incomplete history of Henry V's wars in France, written in French, which is now in the College of Arms, may possibly prove to be one of Basset's compilations.

Both Bale and Tanner distinctly state, however, that Basset's history of Henry V was written in English. It is probable that Hall, who was obviously acquainted with Basset's work, made liberal use of it in his well-known chronicle.

== See also ==
- Einhard, 9th-century historian and author of Vita Karoli Magni, a biography of Charlemagne
