= M-Brain Group =

- Company type: Limited Company
- Industry: Market Intelligence & Competitive Intelligence
- Founded: 1999
- Founder: Marjukka Nyberg and Kim Nyberg
- Headquarters: Helsinki, Finland
- Area served: Worldwide
- Key people: Kimmo Havu (CEO), Joakim Nyberg (CGO), Stuart Reynish (CPO), Eetu Laaksonen (CTO), Henna Pellonmaa (CFO), Kati Tammisto (CMO)
- Products: Market & Competitive Intelligence, Intelligence Software, Research and Advisory
- Services: Market and Competitor Monitoring, Market & Competitor Analysis Market Intelligence, Market Analysis, Competitive Intelligence, Research, Strategic Analysis & Advisory
- Revenue: €19.4 million (in 2021)
- Number of employees: 190
- Website: www.m-brain.com

M-Brain Group is a Finland-based competitive and market intelligence SaaS company. M-Brain’s services are based on a combination of proprietary technology and human intelligence, providing market and competitor monitoring, market analysis, research & advisory services as well as technology and software solutions to support decision-making and strategic planning.

Since 2011, M-Brain has expanded and internationalised its operations through acquisitions. M-Brain is the biggest company in its field in the Nordic countries and among the six largest firms in Europe. M-Brain has offices in 7 countries/territories: Finland, Canada, the United Kingdom, Germany, France, Singapore and Malaysia.

M-Brain is owned by Swedish software investment company Monterro.

== History ==
The company's long-time CEO Marjukka Nyberg founded M-Brain in 1999. Initially, the company focused on print media analysis and measurement services, but the service offering was expanded to cover social and editorial online media, as well as the monitoring and analysis of television and radio broadcasts.

By 2001, M-Brain launched its first digital media monitoring service, which allowed the company to start offering multilingual online monitoring services. M-Brain secured its first outside investor in 2006, when the state-owned venture capital investment firm Veraventure Oy acquired a minority interest in the company.

=== Key developments ===
2007: Kimmo Valtonen was appointed M-Brain's CTO. His responsibilities include R&D.

2011: During 2011, M-Brain attracted new investors, as Veritas Pension Insurance and Oy Ingman Finance Ab invested in the company. This enabled M-Brain to acquire its Swedish competitor Cision AB's Finnish subsidiary Oy Cision Finland Ab. Through this acquisition, M-Brain more than doubled its revenue and number of employees.

2012: In 2012, M-Brain made another acquisition by buying Esmerk, which provides business intelligence management services. Through this acquisition, M-Brain became the biggest company in its field in the Nordic countries and among the six largest firms in Europe. In December 2012, M-Brain launched a new SaaS tool, M-Adaptive, which enables the monitoring and analysis of the impact and results of media and marketing campaigns in digital, social and print media.

2013: Previously M-Brain operated under the Esmerk brand outside of Finland. As of 1 January 2013, the company has operated under the M-Brain brand in all countries. In July 2013, M-Brain made the acquisition of Whitevector, a social media monitoring company in Finland.

2014: On September 4, 2014 M-Brain Oy signed an agreement to purchase the entire share capital of GIA (Global Intelligence Alliance) Group. The combined group offers market intelligence and consulting services bringing GIA's strategic analysis and advisory, market intelligence and related software solutions together with M-Brain's content production and SaaS solutions. Together, the companies have offices in 12 countries. The combined staff amounted to ~450 employees globally.

2016: On April 6, 2016 M-Brain expanded its operations through the acquisition of Norwegian media monitoring and analysis company Opoint Holding. The acquisition included Opoint's three subsidiaries in Norway, Sweden and Estonia. The transaction supports M-Brains strategic goal to further strengthen the company's position in the industry and become the leading company in its field in the Nordic and Baltic countries. The media material handling technology developed by Opoint complements M-Brain's technology.

2018-2021: During this time-period M-Brain gradually divested its legacy media monitoring business in the Nordics while shifting more focus towards its Competitive and Market Intelligence offering.

2022: On June 17, 2022 Leading Nordic software growth investor, Monterro, acquired a majority stake of M-Brain. Monterro also adds expansion capital that will accelerate M-Brain’s growth by further developing its offering and organization.

== Services ==
Market Monitoring and Analysis Customized alerts, monitoring and tracking of clients' markets, customers and competitors. Market and competitor analysis.

Intelligence Plaza Competitive intelligence platform, tailored to help companies manage and benchmark their market and strategic intelligence.

Research, Strategic Analysis & Advisory Strategic analysis, research and advisory services including: Growth Consulting; Market Attractiveness & Entry Analysis; M&A Target Screening & Evaluation; Market Sizing, Segmentation & Forecasting; Value Chain Analysis; Competitor Market Share Analysis; Competitive Benchmarking; Customer Behavior & Perceptions Analysis; etc.

== Technology ==
M-Brain's services are based on in-house R&D and proprietary technology.

== Problems and controversy ==
=== CEO turnover ===
During the 2012 to 2016 period, M-Brain has experienced problematic turnover with two CEOs either resigning or being removed from the company due to various internal issues. In the case of Sirpa Ojala, who joined the company as CEO on March 16, 2015, the company announced on October 6, 2015 (7 months after she joined) that it was "mutually agreed" that she should leave the company.

On December 4, 2019 M-Brain Group announced that Christian Cedercreutz, who had been the CEO for sixteen months, was leaving. His replacement is Mikael Makkonen, who was the M-Brain group COO.

=== CFO turnover ===
During the 2012 to 2016 period, M-Brain has experienced problematic turnover with 2 CFOs either resigning or being removed from the company due to various internal issues and conflicts. In the case of Janne Kärkkäinen, who was appointed as CFO on January 1, 2015 and resigned from M-brain to assume a CFO role at Nixu Corporation in January 2016. The Nixu Corporation press release was issued on December 2, 2015, indicating Mr. Kärkkäinen resigned earlier in 2015.

=== Staff turnover ===
The company has experienced heavy turnover of staff in recent years. On June 20, 2016 the company announced that 24 employees were being terminated. The company also stated in the press release that further terminations were expected in late 2016.
