= Media contacts database =

In public relations (PR) and marketing, a media contacts database is a resource which catalogs the names, contact information, and other details about people who work in various media professions. These include journalists, reporters, editors, publishers, contributors, freelance journalists, opinion writers, social media personalities/ influencers, TV show anchors, radio show hosts, DJs, and others.

A media contacts database usually contains the following information:

- Full name of the media contact,
- The publication or channel they work for
- Designations (past and present)
- Topics they cover, or their beat
- Contact information found in public domains
- Online presence like blogs and other social networking sites
- Education Information

== Overview ==
A media contacts database is a public relations tool that is maintained and used by PR professionals to pitch stories on a particular topic, product, or company to a specific group of journalists. These journalists would then write or speak about the particular topic in a relevant issue or episode of their shows.

A media contacts database allows a PR professional to gain easy access to hundreds of journalists within a short span of time. Media contacts databases are created and sold by many media research companies that offer such PR software for professionals.
