= PR Newswire =

American distributor of press releases (company)

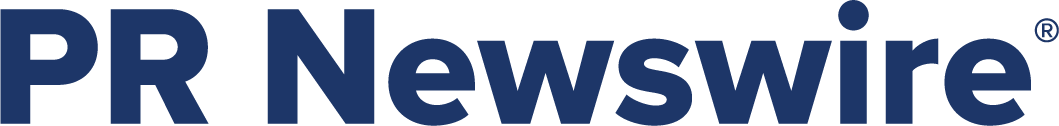
- Type: Subsidiary
- Industry: Communications
- Founded: August 3, 1954; 72 years ago
- Founder: Herbert Muschel
- Headquarters: 300 S Riverside Plaza, Chicago, Illinois, United States
- Area served: Worldwide
- Key people: Guy Abramo (CEO); Matt Brown (President)
- Services: Newswire distribution
- Parent: Western Union (1971–1982); United Newspapers (1982–2015); Cision (2016–present)
- Website: prnewswire.com

PR Newswire is a distributor of press releases headquartered in Chicago. The service was created in 1954 to allow companies to electronically send press releases to news organizations, using teleprinters at first. The founder, Herbert Muschel, operated the service from his house in Manhattan for approximately 15 years. The business was eventually sold to Western Union and then United Newspapers of London. In December 2015, Cision Inc. announced it would acquire the company. On January 1, 2021, Cision formally merged PR Newswire into the company.

== History ==
PR Newswire was founded in March 1954 by Herbert Muschel, who ran the business from his town house in New York City for the first 15 years of its operation. The company used telecommunications lines and teleprinters owned by Western Union to distribute content to a dozen news organizations in New York. Its first customer was Trans World Airlines.

In 1963, Muschel recruited David Steinberg of the New York Herald Tribune to take a management position with the company after the 1962–1963 New York City newspaper strike. Muschel had been impressed by Steinberg's use of the service to report financial news during the strike without using reporters.

Muschel sold 81% of the company to Western Union in 1970 for over 60 thousand shares of letter stock, with Muschel and Steinberg continuing to manage the company after the acquisition. Steinberg served as vice president and chief of operations, and became president of the company in 1976.

In 1977, PR Newswire began using electronic terminals for copy editing.

By 1978, PR Newswire distributed content to approximately 250 news points and financial institutions in 75 cities using 12,000 miles of private transmission lines. In addition to its New York headquarters, the service also sent content from offices in Boston, Miami, Los Angeles, and San Francisco at a rate of 150 words per minute.

In 1982, the company was sold to United Newspapers of London for $9.5 million. PR Newswire acquired Mediawire in 1983, expanding the company's reach into over 125 newsrooms in Pennsylvania, Delaware, New Jersey, Maryland, and West Virginia. The company acquired Intermedia Group in 1985, incorporating its regional news wires in Washington, D.C., Michigan, Ohio, and Georgia.

ABC-TV and Indesys partnered with PR Newswire in 1989 to provide news feeds to television and entertainment editors and writers in the U.S. and Canada. Program changes, production schedules, and news from entertainment sources were transmitted over a satellite distribution network and an FM subcarrier.

Steinberg retired in 1992, but continued as vice chairman until 2002. During his tenure, the service became a state-of-the-art communications network with 700 employees.

In 2000 the company acquired eWatch, founded in 1995 as an automated service to monitor websites, chat rooms, Usenet groups, web publications, online service forums and investor message boards for mentions of a specific organization, issue, product or service. In 2001, PR Newswire issued a multimedia news release for Touchstone Pictures promoting the film Pearl Harbor, which included b-roll, soundbites, high resolution images, and film trailer. On April 17, 2007, PR Newswire acquired Vintage Filings.

In December 2008, PR Newswire moved its New York City corporate headquarters from Midtown Manhattan to Lower Manhattan, at 350 Hudson Street. In mid-2009, PR Newswire acquired The Fuel Team. As of 2026, the largest competitor to PR Newswire is Business Wire. On December 15, 2015, PR Newswire was sold to global media intelligence company, Cision, for $841 million. The transaction, which required approval by the shareholders of UBM plc as well as regulatory approvals, was expected to close late in the first quarter of 2016. As of June 2016 (closing date of the deal) it became a subsidiary of Cision.

In October 2013, PR Newswire confirmed that a database containing customer login credentials and business contact information had been compromised. The database contained approximately 10,000 records, although the company said the number of affected customers was lower because some customers maintained multiple accounts. PR Newswire notified affected customers and required password resets. The company said its preliminary review indicated that customer payment information had not been compromised.

In the 2010s, PR Newswire and its competitor Business Wire were the target of extensive successful attacks by Ukrainian hackers, who accessed not yet published press releases to enable insider trading. According to the FBI, the case was then the world's largest known computer hacking and securities fraud, with profits exceeding $100 million in trades that were made public by the SEC, but believed to be vastly higher than that by the authorities. Fewer than half of over 100 suspects involved had been arrested as of 2018.

On November 5, 2021, a fraudulent press release distributed through PR Newswire claimed that Kroger would begin accepting Bitcoin Cash as payment. The release also appeared on Kroger's investor relations website, which automatically received announcements from the service. Kroger denied the announcement, and PR Newswire removed the release and said it was investigating the incident, including possible criminal activity.

In 2023, PR Newswire introduced SocialBoost, a social-sharing tool developed with SoSha. In 2025, it launched Amplify, an AI-powered platform for public relations and communications professionals.

== ProfNet ==
ProfNet is an online community of communications professionals made to provide reporters access to expert sources and a subsidiary of PR Newswire. ProfNet was founded in 1992 by Dan Forbush, then an administrator at SUNY Stony Brook. The original pilot program operated on CompuServe. After the university changed administrations in 1994, Forbush was unable to convince them to continue running the service. Forbush privatized ProfNet in 1995 and sold it to PR Newswire in March 1996. As a commercial service, ProfNet began charging institutions to participate. By the end of the following year, the distribution list included 2,800 contacts, mostly affiliated with colleges and universities. Other contacts worked at industrial laboratories like Bell Labs and societies like the American Association for the Advancement of Science. Many contacts were spokespeople for their institutions, rather than subject-matter experts themselves.

== See also ==
- List of press release agencies
- Public relations
