= 2003 24 Hours of Daytona =

Previous: 2002	Next: 2004
Index: Races | Winners

Track map of Daytona International Speedway

The 2003 Rolex 24 at Daytona was a Grand-Am Rolex Sports Car Series 24-hour endurance sports car race held on February 1–2, 2003 at the Daytona International Speedway road course. The race served as the first round of the 2003 Rolex Sports Car Series. The race saw the debut of the Daytona Prototype as the new top class of the series. However, the new cars proved only marginally faster than the lower classes and suffered frequent mechanical failures during the race, allowing a car from the GT class to take overall victory. Overall victory and victory in the GT class went to the No. 66 Porsche 996 GT3-RS from The Racer's Group, driven by Kevin Buckler, Michael Schrom, Jörg Bergmeister, and Timo Bernhard. The Daytona Prototype class was won by the No. 88 Multimatic MDP1 from Multimatic driven by Scott Maxwell, David Brabham, and David Empringham. The SRP II class was won by the No. 5 Lola-Nissan from Team Seattle/Essex Racing, driven by Ross Bentley, Don Kitch Jr., Joe Pruskowski, and Justin Pruskowski. Finally, the GTS class was won by the No. 24 Mosler MT900 from Perspective Racing, driven by Jérôme Policand, Michel Neugarten, João Barbosa, and Andy Wallace.

== Race results ==
Class winners in bold.

Pos	Class	No	Team	Drivers	Chassis	Tire	Laps
Pos	Class	No	Team	Drivers	Engine	Tire	Laps
1	**GT**	**66**	**(United States) The Racer's Group**	**(United States) Kevin Buckler (United States) Michael Schrom (Germany) Timo Bernhard (Germany) Jörg Bergmeister**	**Porsche 996 GT3-RS**	D	**695**
1	**GT**	**66**	**(United States) The Racer's Group**	**(United States) Kevin Buckler (United States) Michael Schrom (Germany) Timo Bernhard (Germany) Jörg Bergmeister**	**Porsche 3.6 L Flat-6**	D	**695**
2	GT	35	(United States) Risi Competizione	(Germany) Ralf Kelleners (United States) Anthony Lazzaro (United Kingdom) Johnny Mowlem	Ferrari 360 Modena GT	D	686
2	GT	35	(United States) Risi Competizione	(Germany) Ralf Kelleners (United States) Anthony Lazzaro (United Kingdom) Johnny Mowlem	Ferrari 3.6 L V8	D	686
3	GT	83	(United States) Rennwerks Motorsports	(United States) David Murry (United States) Dave Standridge (United States) Johannes van Overbeek (United States) Richard Steranka	Porsche 996 GT3-R	D	684
3	GT	83	(United States) Rennwerks Motorsports	(United States) David Murry (United States) Dave Standridge (United States) Johannes van Overbeek (United States) Richard Steranka	Porsche 3.6 L Flat-6	D	684
4	**DP**	**88**	**(Canada) Multimatic**	**(Canada) Scott Maxwell (Australia) David Brabham (Canada) David Empringham**	**Multimatic MDP1**	G	**679**
4	**DP**	**88**	**(Canada) Multimatic**	**(Canada) Scott Maxwell (Australia) David Brabham (Canada) David Empringham**	**Ford 5.0 L V8**	G	**679**
5	DP	59	(United States) Brumos Racing	(United States) J. C. France (United States) Hurley Haywood (Canada) Scott Goodyear (United States) Scott Sharp	Fabcar FDSC/03	G	661
5	DP	59	(United States) Brumos Racing	(United States) J. C. France (United States) Hurley Haywood (Canada) Scott Goodyear (United States) Scott Sharp	Porsche 3.6 L Flat-6	G	661
6	GT	43	(United States) Orbit Racing	(United States) Peter Baron (United States) Leo Hindery (Germany) Marc Lieb (United States) Kyle Petty	Porsche 996 GT3-RS	D	656
6	GT	43	(United States) Orbit Racing	(United States) Peter Baron (United States) Leo Hindery (Germany) Marc Lieb (United States) Kyle Petty	Porsche 3.6 L Flat-6	D	656
7	**SRP II**	**5**	**(United States) Team Seattle/Essex Racing**	**(Canada) Ross Bentley (United States) Don Kitch Jr. (United States) Joe Pruskowski (United States) Justin Pruskowski**	**Lola B2K/40**	D	**652**
7	**SRP II**	**5**	**(United States) Team Seattle/Essex Racing**	**(Canada) Ross Bentley (United States) Don Kitch Jr. (United States) Joe Pruskowski (United States) Justin Pruskowski**	**Nissan 3.0 L V6**	D	**652**
8	SRP II	15	(United States) Team Seattle/Essex Racing	(United States) Wade Gaughran (United States) Steve Gorriaran (United States) Peter MacLeod (United States) Dave Gaylord	Lola B2K/40	D	648
8	SRP II	15	(United States) Team Seattle/Essex Racing	(United States) Wade Gaughran (United States) Steve Gorriaran (United States) Peter MacLeod (United States) Dave Gaylord	Nissan 3.0 L V6	D	648
9	**GTS**	**24**	**(France) Perspective Racing**	**(France) Jérôme Policand (Portugal) João Barbosa (Belgium) Michel Neugarten (United Kingdom) Andy Wallace**	**Mosler MT900 R**	G	**641**
9	**GTS**	**24**	**(France) Perspective Racing**	**(France) Jérôme Policand (Portugal) João Barbosa (Belgium) Michel Neugarten (United Kingdom) Andy Wallace**	**Chevrolet 5.7 L V8**	G	**641**
10	GTS	46	(United States) Morgan-Dollar Motorsports	(United States) Charles Morgan (United States) Lance Norick (United States) Jim Pace (United States) Rob Morgan	Chevrolet Corvette	G	639
10	GTS	46	(United States) Morgan-Dollar Motorsports	(United States) Charles Morgan (United States) Lance Norick (United States) Jim Pace (United States) Rob Morgan	Chevrolet 5.5 L V8	G	639
11	GT	34	(Canada) Ferri Competizione	(Italy) Mauro Baldi (United Kingdom) Justin Keen (Belgium) Eric van de Poele (United States) Ryan Hampton	Ferrari 360 Modena GT	D	638
11	GT	34	(Canada) Ferri Competizione	(Italy) Mauro Baldi (United Kingdom) Justin Keen (Belgium) Eric van de Poele (United States) Ryan Hampton	Ferrari 3.6 L V8	D	638
12	GTS	31	(United Kingdom) Rollcentre Racing	(United Kingdom) Richard Stanton (United Kingdom) Rob Barff (United Kingdom) Andy Britnell (United States) Rick Sutherland	Mosler MT900 R	G	635
12	GTS	31	(United Kingdom) Rollcentre Racing	(United Kingdom) Richard Stanton (United Kingdom) Rob Barff (United Kingdom) Andy Britnell (United States) Rick Sutherland	Chevrolet 5.7 L V8	G	635
13	GT	69	(United States) Marcus Racing	(United States) Brian Cunningham (United States) Hugh Plumb (United States) Cory Friedman (United States) Craig Stanton	BMW M3	D	633
13	GT	69	(United States) Marcus Racing	(United States) Brian Cunningham (United States) Hugh Plumb (United States) Cory Friedman (United States) Craig Stanton	BMW 3.2 L I6	D	633
14	GT	20	(United States) JMB Racing	(Brazil) Augusto Farfus (France) Emmanuel Collard (Italy) Max Papis (Italy) Andrea Garbagnati	Ferrari 360 Modena	D	621
14	GT	20	(United States) JMB Racing	(Brazil) Augusto Farfus (France) Emmanuel Collard (Italy) Max Papis (Italy) Andrea Garbagnati	Ferrari 3.6 L V8	D	621
15	GTS	30	(United Kingdom) Rollcentre Racing	(United Kingdom) Martin Short (United Kingdom) Tom Herridge (United Kingdom) John Burton (Canada) David Shep	Mosler MT900 R	G	601
15	GTS	30	(United Kingdom) Rollcentre Racing	(United Kingdom) Martin Short (United Kingdom) Tom Herridge (United Kingdom) John Burton (Canada) David Shep	Chevrolet 5.7 L V8	G	601
16	GTS	7	(Germany) Konrad Motorsport	(Austria) Franz Konrad (Switzerland) Toni Seiler (Brazil) Airton Daré (France) Jean-François Yvon	Saleen S7-R	G	600
16	GTS	7	(Germany) Konrad Motorsport	(Austria) Franz Konrad (Switzerland) Toni Seiler (Brazil) Airton Daré (France) Jean-François Yvon	Ford 6.0 L V8	G	600
17	GT	49	(Italy) Pit Bull/MAC Racing	(Italy) Bepo Orlandi (Italy) Michele Merendino (United States) Derek Clark (United States) Ron Atapattu	Porsche 996 GT3-RS	D	595
17	GT	49	(Italy) Pit Bull/MAC Racing	(Italy) Bepo Orlandi (Italy) Michele Merendino (United States) Derek Clark (United States) Ron Atapattu	Porsche 3.6 L Flat-6	D	595
18 DNF	SRP II	21	(United States) Archangel Motorsport Services	(United States) Larry Oberto (United States) Chris Bingham (United States) Derrike Cope (United States) Brian DeVries	Lola B2K/40	D	589
18 DNF	SRP II	21	(United States) Archangel Motorsport Services	(United States) Larry Oberto (United States) Chris Bingham (United States) Derrike Cope (United States) Brian DeVries	Nissan 3.0 L V6	D	589
19	GT	44	(United States) Orbit Racing	(United States) Mike Fitzgerald (Puerto Rico) Manuel Matos (United States) Joe Policastro (United States) Joe Policastro Jr.	Porsche 996 GT3-RS	D	566
19	GT	44	(United States) Orbit Racing	(United States) Mike Fitzgerald (Puerto Rico) Manuel Matos (United States) Joe Policastro (United States) Joe Policastro Jr.	Porsche 3.6 L Flat-6	D	566
20 DNF	SRP II	97	(Italy) Lucchini Engineering	(Italy) Mirko Savoldi (Italy) Piergiuseppe Peroni (Italy) Filippo Francioni	Lucchini SR2002	D	548
20 DNF	SRP II	97	(Italy) Lucchini Engineering	(Italy) Mirko Savoldi (Italy) Piergiuseppe Peroni (Italy) Filippo Francioni	Nissan 3.0 L V6	D	548
21	GTS	09	(United States) Flis Motorsports	(United States) Doug Goad (United States) Paul Menard (United States) Paul Mears Jr. (United States) Jim Briody	Chevrolet Corvette	G	542
21	GTS	09	(United States) Flis Motorsports	(United States) Doug Goad (United States) Paul Menard (United States) Paul Mears Jr. (United States) Jim Briody	Chevrolet 6.2 L V8	G	542
22 DNF	GT	68	(United States) The Racer's Group	(United States) Jim Michaelian (United States) R. J. Valentine (United States) Tom Hessert Jr. (United States) Tom Hessert III	Porsche 996 GT3-R	D	501
22 DNF	GT	68	(United States) The Racer's Group	(United States) Jim Michaelian (United States) R. J. Valentine (United States) Tom Hessert Jr. (United States) Tom Hessert III	Porsche 3.6 L Flat-6	D	501
23 DNF	GT	03	(United States) Marcos USA	(Netherlands) Cor Euser (Netherlands) Rob Knook (Netherlands) Donny Crevels (Netherlands) Peter van der Kolk	Marcos Mantis Plus	D	465
23 DNF	GT	03	(United States) Marcos USA	(Netherlands) Cor Euser (Netherlands) Rob Knook (Netherlands) Donny Crevels (Netherlands) Peter van der Kolk	Ford 4.6 L V8	D	465
24	DP	8	(United States) G&W Motorsports	(Austria) Dieter Quester (United States) Boris Said (United States) Darren Law (Italy) Luca Riccitelli	Picchio DP2	G	451
24	DP	8	(United States) G&W Motorsports	(Austria) Dieter Quester (United States) Boris Said (United States) Darren Law (Italy) Luca Riccitelli	BMW 4.9 L V8	G	451
25 DNF	DP	3	(United States) Cegwa Sport	(Poland) Darius Grala (Brazil) Oswaldo Negri Jr. (United States) Josh Rehm (United States) Guy Cosmo	Fabcar FDSC/03	G	403
25 DNF	DP	3	(United States) Cegwa Sport	(Poland) Darius Grala (Brazil) Oswaldo Negri Jr. (United States) Josh Rehm (United States) Guy Cosmo	Toyota 4.3 L V8	G	403
26 DNF	GTS	19	(United States) ACP Motorsports	(United States) Anthony Puleo (United States) Kerry Hitt (Switzerland) Robert Dubler (United States) Mark Kennedy	Chevrolet Corvette	G	391
26 DNF	GTS	19	(United States) ACP Motorsports	(United States) Anthony Puleo (United States) Kerry Hitt (Switzerland) Robert Dubler (United States) Mark Kennedy	Chevrolet 6.1 L V8	G	391
27 DNF	GTS	05	(United States) RE/MAX Racing	(United States) Craig Conway (United States) John Metcalf (United States) Rick Carelli (United States) Dave Linger	Chevrolet Corvette	G	378
27 DNF	GTS	05	(United States) RE/MAX Racing	(United States) Craig Conway (United States) John Metcalf (United States) Rick Carelli (United States) Dave Linger	Chevrolet 6.2 L V8	G	378
28 DNF	GTS	77	(Germany) RWS Motorsport	(Russia) Alexey Vasilyev (Japan) Tetsuya Tanaka (Russia) Nikolai Fomenko (Austria) Walter Lechner Jr.	Porsche 996 GT3-R	G	361
28 DNF	GTS	77	(Germany) RWS Motorsport	(Russia) Alexey Vasilyev (Japan) Tetsuya Tanaka (Russia) Nikolai Fomenko (Austria) Walter Lechner Jr.	Porsche 3.6 L Flat-6	G	361
29 DNF	GT	99	(United States) NETTTS Racing	(United States) Jim Hamblin (United States) Barry Brensinger (United States) James Nelson (United States) Mark Greenberg	Porsche 996 GT3-RS	D	316
29 DNF	GT	99	(United States) NETTTS Racing	(United States) Jim Hamblin (United States) Barry Brensinger (United States) James Nelson (United States) Mark Greenberg	Porsche 3.6 L Flat-6	D	316
30 DNF	GTS	40	(United States) Derhaag Motorsports	(United Kingdom) Justin Bell (United Kingdom) Derek Bell (Canada) Ken Wilden (United States) Simon Gregg	Chevrolet Corvette	G	260
30 DNF	GTS	40	(United States) Derhaag Motorsports	(United Kingdom) Justin Bell (United Kingdom) Derek Bell (Canada) Ken Wilden (United States) Simon Gregg	Chevrolet 6.1 L V8	G	260
31 DNF	GT	33	(United States) Scuderia Ferrari of Washington	(United States) Cort Wagner (United States) Brent Martini (Canada) Sylvain Tremblay (United States) Selby Wellman	Ferrari 360 Modena GT	D	214
31 DNF	GT	33	(United States) Scuderia Ferrari of Washington	(United States) Cort Wagner (United States) Brent Martini (Canada) Sylvain Tremblay (United States) Selby Wellman	Ferrari 3.6 L V8	D	214
32 DNF	GT	73	(United Kingdom) Graham Nash Motorsport	(New Zealand) Rob Wilson (United Kingdom) Mike Newton (United Kingdom) David Gooding (United Kingdom) Martyn Konig	Porsche 996 GT3-R	D	211
32 DNF	GT	73	(United Kingdom) Graham Nash Motorsport	(New Zealand) Rob Wilson (United Kingdom) Mike Newton (United Kingdom) David Gooding (United Kingdom) Martyn Konig	Porsche 3.6 L Flat-6	D	211
33 DNF	GT	10	(Italy) MAC Racing	(France) David Terrien (Italy) Gianluca de Lorenzi (France) Didier Moinel Delalande (France) Marco Saviozzi	Porsche 996 GT3-R	D	206
33 DNF	GT	10	(Italy) MAC Racing	(France) David Terrien (Italy) Gianluca de Lorenzi (France) Didier Moinel Delalande (France) Marco Saviozzi	Porsche 3.6 L Flat-6	D	206
34 DNF	DP	58	(United States) Brumos Racing	(United States) David Donohue (United States) Mike Borkowski (United States) Randy Pobst (Canada) Chris Bye	Fabcar FDSC/03	G	160
34 DNF	DP	58	(United States) Brumos Racing	(United States) David Donohue (United States) Mike Borkowski (United States) Randy Pobst (Canada) Chris Bye	Porsche 3.6 L Flat-6	G	160
35 DNF	GT	67	(United States) The Racer's Group	(United States) Andrew Davis (Canada) Robert Julian (United States) Tom Nastasi (Canada) Dave Lacey	Porsche 996 GT3-RS	D	151
35 DNF	GT	67	(United States) The Racer's Group	(United States) Andrew Davis (Canada) Robert Julian (United States) Tom Nastasi (Canada) Dave Lacey	Porsche 3.6 L Flat-6	D	151
36 DNF	GT	98	(United States) Schumacher Racing	(Germany) Sascha Maassen (United States) Martin Snow (Germany) Lucas Luhr (United States) Larry Schumacher	Porsche 996 GT3-RS	D	135
36 DNF	GT	98	(United States) Schumacher Racing	(Germany) Sascha Maassen (United States) Martin Snow (Germany) Lucas Luhr (United States) Larry Schumacher	Porsche 3.6 L Flat-6	D	135
37 DNF	SRP II	80	(United States) G&W Motorsports	(United States) Shawn Bayliff (United States) Steve Marshall (United States) Robert Prilika (United States) Andy Lally	Picchio D-USA	D	121
37 DNF	SRP II	80	(United States) G&W Motorsports	(United States) Shawn Bayliff (United States) Steve Marshall (United States) Robert Prilika (United States) Andy Lally	BMW 3.0 L I6	D	121
38 DNF	GT	57	(Germany) Seikel Motorsport	(Italy) Alex Caffi (Italy) Gabrio Rosa (Italy) Fabio Rosa (Switzerland) Andrea Chiesa	Porsche 996 GT3-RS	D	101
38 DNF	GT	57	(Germany) Seikel Motorsport	(Italy) Alex Caffi (Italy) Gabrio Rosa (Italy) Fabio Rosa (Switzerland) Andrea Chiesa	Porsche 3.6 L Flat-6	D	101
39 DNF	DP	54	(United States) Bell Motorsports	(Belgium) Didier Theys (United States) Forest Barber (United States) Terry Borcheller (Brazil) Christian Fittipaldi	Doran JE4	G	67
39 DNF	DP	54	(United States) Bell Motorsports	(Belgium) Didier Theys (United States) Forest Barber (United States) Terry Borcheller (Brazil) Christian Fittipaldi	Chevrolet 5.5 L V8	G	67
40 DNF	GT	22	(United States) JMB Racing	(United States) Stephen Earle (United States) Philip Shearer (France) Stéphane Grégoire (Italy) Ludovico Manfredi	Ferrari 360 Modena	D	54
40 DNF	GT	22	(United States) JMB Racing	(United States) Stephen Earle (United States) Philip Shearer (France) Stéphane Grégoire (Italy) Ludovico Manfredi	Ferrari 3.6 L V8	D	54
41 DNF	GTS	48	(United States) Heritage Motorsports	(United States) Tommy Riggins (United States) David Machavern (United States) Kevin Lepage (United States) Scott Lagasse	Ford Mustang	G	49
41 DNF	GTS	48	(United States) Heritage Motorsports	(United States) Tommy Riggins (United States) David Machavern (United States) Kevin Lepage (United States) Scott Lagasse	Ford 5.9 L V8	G	49
42 DNF	GTS	18	(United States) Boston Motorsports Group	(United States) Ken Stiver (United States) Scott Deware (United States) Don Bell (United States) Jeff Kline	Mosler MT900 R	G	14
42 DNF	GTS	18	(United States) Boston Motorsports Group	(United States) Ken Stiver (United States) Scott Deware (United States) Don Bell (United States) Jeff Kline	Chevrolet 5.7 L V8	G	14
43 DNF	GTS	6	(United States) Gunnar Racing	(United States) Gunnar Jeannette (United States) Duncan Dayton (United States) Peter Kitchak (United States) Ronald Zitza	Porsche 911 GT1	G	9
43 DNF	GTS	6	(United States) Gunnar Racing	(United States) Gunnar Jeannette (United States) Duncan Dayton (United States) Peter Kitchak (United States) Ronald Zitza	Porsche 3.6 L Flat-6	G	9
44 DNF	GTS	51	(Germany) Proton Competition	(Italy) Mauro Casadei (Germany) Christian Ried (Germany) Gerold Reid (Austria) Manfred Jurasz	Porsche 911 GT2	G	2
44 DNF	GTS	51	(Germany) Proton Competition	(Italy) Mauro Casadei (Germany) Christian Ried (Germany) Gerold Reid (Austria) Manfred Jurasz	Porsche 3.6 L Turbo Flat-6	G	2
DNS	GT	61	(Netherlands) System Force Motorsports	(Netherlands) Peter van Merksteijn Sr. (Netherlands) Charles Brugman (Netherlands) Frans Munsterhuis (United States) Cougar Jacobsen	Porsche 996 GT3-RS	D	-
DNS	GT	61	(Netherlands) System Force Motorsports	(Netherlands) Peter van Merksteijn Sr. (Netherlands) Charles Brugman (Netherlands) Frans Munsterhuis (United States) Cougar Jacobsen	Porsche 3.6 L Flat-6	D	-
