= Multimatic MDP1 =

Prototype racing car

Multimatic MDP1 Multimatic Ford Focus
- Category: Daytona Prototype
- Constructor: Multimatic
- Successor: Proto-Auto Lola B08/70

Technical specifications
- Chassis: Carbon Composite Chassis
- Suspension (front): Inboard Adj Spring/Damper Units, Blade-Type Anti-Roll Bar
- Suspension (rear): Inboard Adj Spring/Damper Units, Blade-Type Anti-Roll Bar
- Axle track: Front: 65.2 in (1,657 mm); Rear: 65.1 in (1,653 mm)
- Wheelbase: 110 in (2,790 mm)
- Engine: Roush-Yates Racing Ford MOD 5.0 L; 305.1 cu in (5,000 cc) 32-valve, DOHC V8, w/Variable Inlet Geometry naturally-aspirated, mid-mounted
- Torque: 400 lb⋅ft (542.33 N⋅m)
- Transmission: EMCO GA45 5 speed sequential
- Power: 500 hp (507 PS; 373 kW)
- Weight: 2,158.3 lb (979 kg)
- Brakes: AP Racing CP6060 Discs w/CP4260 Calipers
- Tyres: Goodyear

Competition history
- Notable entrants: (Canada) Multimatic Motorsports (United States) SpeedSource (United States) Essex Racing
- Notable drivers: (Canada) Scott Maxwell (Australia) David Brabham (Canada) David Empringham (Canada) Ross Bentley (United States) Mike Borkowski (Netherlands) Arie Luyendyk Jr. (United Kingdom) Justin Bell (United States) Tom Hessert III (Canada) Sylvain Tremblay (United States) Gunnar Jeannette (United States) Kurt Busch (United States) Matt Kenseth (United States) Greg Biffle (United States) Jeff Bucknum
- Debut: 2003 24 Hours of Daytona
- Last event: 2007 Montreal 400k
Races	Wins	Podiums	Poles	F/Laps
15	0 overall 1 class win	0	1	0
- Teams' Championships: 0
- Constructors' Championships: 0
- Drivers' Championships: 0

The Multimatic MDP1 (also referred to as the Multimatic Ford Focus) is a first-generation Daytona Prototype race car, designed, developed and built by Canadian manufacturer Multimatic, for the Grand-Am Rolex Sports Car Series, in 2003. It was powered by a Robert-Yates Racing Ford V8 engine. A total of four cars were built.

The chassis would form the basis of the second-generation Daytona Prototype, Proto-Auto Lola B08/70.

== Competition history ==
=== 2003 ===
The car made its debut in the hands of the factory team, Multimatic Motorsports, and achieved a class win at the 24 Hours of Daytona, albeit fourth overall. This would be the highest result for the car throughout its career. SpeedSource would campaign a car for the final four rounds of the season with a best finish of seventh overall at the VIR 400. Essex Racing, who also ordered a car, finished 29th overall at the final race of the season.

=== 2004 ===
At the opening race at Daytona, four chassis were entered with two each from SpeedSource and Essex Racing. All four cars would run into mechanical issues and eventually retired from the race. They would continue to run the car and found modest success. Essex Racing finished in the overall top ten a total of three times while SpeedSource had its highest finish of 11th at the first race at Homestead.

=== 2005–2007 ===
A factory run entry by Multimatic at the 2005 24 Hours of Daytona saw the #49 driven by NASCAR drivers Kurt Busch, Matt Kenseth and Greg Biffle. The car would run into mechanical problems for a second year in a row at Daytona when Biffle stopped on track with less than an hour to go. Blackforest Motorsports also retired from the race due to damage from an accident.

The car did not appear in any other races for 2005, with the chassis at a significant aero disadvantage especially when compared to the dominant Riley MKXI. Grand-Am allowed Multimatic to make changes to make the chassis more competitive. Despite this, no team would run the MDP1 in 2006.

In 2007, Multimatic would run the car in its final race at the Montreal 400k with drivers Scott Maxwell and Gunnar Jeanette. They would be classified 35th but, retired from the race. The reason for the entry was due to Grand-Am rules where Proto-Auto (association between Lola and Krohn Racing) bought the constructor's license from Multimatic. That partnership led to the Proto-Auto Lola B08/70.
