= 2004 24 Hours of Daytona =

Previous: 2003	Next: 2005
Index: Races | Winners

Track map of Daytona International Speedway

The 2004 Rolex 24 at Daytona was a Grand-Am Rolex Sports Car Series 24-hour endurance sports car race held on January 31–February 1, 2004 at the Daytona International Speedway road course. The race served as the first round of the 2004 Rolex Sports Car Series. The race was won by the No. 54 Doran JE4-Pontiac entered by Bell Motorsports and driven by Terry Borcheller, Forest Barber, Andy Pilgrim, and Christian Fittipaldi, marking the first time that the Daytona Prototype class won the race overall. The GT class was won by the No. 44 Porsche 996 GT3-RS entered by Orbit Racing and driven by Mike Fitzgerald, Robin Liddell, Johnny Mowlem, Joe Policastro, and Joe Policastro Jr. The SGS class was won by the No. 93 Porsche 996 GT3 Cup entered by Doncaster Racing and driven by Jean-François Dumoulin, Marc Lieb, Robert Julien, and Greg Pootmans.

== Race results ==
Class winners in bold.

Pos	Class	No	Team	Drivers	Chassis	Tire	Laps
Pos	Class	No	Team	Drivers	Engine	Tire	Laps
1	**DP**	**54**	**(United States) Bell Motorsports**	**(United States) Andy Pilgrim (United States) Terry Borcheller (Brazil) Christian Fittipaldi (United States) Forest Barber**	**Doran JE4**	G	**526**
1	**DP**	**54**	**(United States) Bell Motorsports**	**(United States) Andy Pilgrim (United States) Terry Borcheller (Brazil) Christian Fittipaldi (United States) Forest Barber**	**Pontiac LS6 5.5 L V8**	G	**526**
2	**GT**	**44**	**(United States) Orbit Racing**	**(United States) Mike Fitzgerald (United Kingdom) Robin Liddell (United Kingdom) Johnny Mowlem (United States) Joe Policastro (United States) Joe Policastro Jr.**	**Porsche 996 GT3-RS**	D	**523**
2	**GT**	**44**	**(United States) Orbit Racing**	**(United States) Mike Fitzgerald (United Kingdom) Robin Liddell (United Kingdom) Johnny Mowlem (United States) Joe Policastro (United States) Joe Policastro Jr.**	**Porsche 3.6 L Flat-6**	D	**523**
3	GT	74	(United States) Flying Lizard Motorsports	(United States) Lonnie Pechnik (United States) Seth Neiman (United States) Johannes van Overbeek (United States) Peter Cunningham (Germany) Mike Rockenfeller	Porsche 996 GT3 Cup	D	523
3	GT	74	(United States) Flying Lizard Motorsports	(United States) Lonnie Pechnik (United States) Seth Neiman (United States) Johannes van Overbeek (United States) Peter Cunningham (Germany) Mike Rockenfeller	Porsche 3.6 L Flat-6	D	523
4	DP	27	(United States) Doran Lista Racing	(Belgium) Didier Theys (Belgium) Marc Goossens (Netherlands) Jan Lammers (Switzerland) Fredy Lienhard	Doran JE4	G	521
4	DP	27	(United States) Doran Lista Racing	(Belgium) Didier Theys (Belgium) Marc Goossens (Netherlands) Jan Lammers (Switzerland) Fredy Lienhard	Lexus 4.3 L V8	G	521
5 DNF	DP	2	(United States) Howard-Boss Motorsports	(United Kingdom) Andy Wallace (United States) Dale Earnhardt Jr. (United States) Tony Stewart	Crawford DP03	G	519
5 DNF	DP	2	(United States) Howard-Boss Motorsports	(United Kingdom) Andy Wallace (United States) Dale Earnhardt Jr. (United States) Tony Stewart	Chevrolet LS6 5.5 L V8	G	519
6	GT	73	(Austria) Red Bull BE Racing	(Austria) Philipp Peter (Austria) Dieter Quester (Italy) Andrea Montermini (Austria) Klaus Engelhorn	Ferrari 360 Modena	D	511
6	GT	73	(Austria) Red Bull BE Racing	(Austria) Philipp Peter (Austria) Dieter Quester (Italy) Andrea Montermini (Austria) Klaus Engelhorn	Ferrari 3.6 L V8	D	511
7	DP	6	(United States) Michael Shank Racing	(United States) Kelly Collins (Brazil) Thomas Erdos (United States) Cort Wagner (United Kingdom) Mike Newton (United States) Brent Martini	Doran JE4	G	509
7	DP	6	(United States) Michael Shank Racing	(United States) Kelly Collins (Brazil) Thomas Erdos (United States) Cort Wagner (United Kingdom) Mike Newton (United States) Brent Martini	Lexus 4.3 L V8	G	509
8 DNF	DP	10	(United States) SunTrust Racing	(Italy) Max Angelelli (South Africa) Wayne Taylor (France) Emmanuel Collard	Riley Mk XI	G	508
8 DNF	DP	10	(United States) SunTrust Racing	(Italy) Max Angelelli (South Africa) Wayne Taylor (France) Emmanuel Collard	Pontiac LS6 5.5 L V8	G	508
9	**SGS**	**91**	**(Canada) Doncaster Racing**	**(Canada) Jean-François Dumoulin (Germany) Marc Lieb (Canada) Robert Julien (Canada) Greg Pootmans**	**Porsche 996 GT3 Cup**	H	**504**
9	**SGS**	**91**	**(Canada) Doncaster Racing**	**(Canada) Jean-François Dumoulin (Germany) Marc Lieb (Canada) Robert Julien (Canada) Greg Pootmans**	**Porsche 3.6 L Flat-6**	H	**504**
10	DP	01	(United States) Chip Ganassi Racing	(United States) Scott Pruett (Italy) Max Papis (New Zealand) Scott Dixon (Mexico) Jimmy Morales	Riley Mk XI	G	502
10	DP	01	(United States) Chip Ganassi Racing	(United States) Scott Pruett (Italy) Max Papis (New Zealand) Scott Dixon (Mexico) Jimmy Morales	Lexus 4.3 L V8	G	502
11	GT	56	(Germany) Seikel Motorsport	(Canada) Tony Burgess (United States) Philip Collin (Netherlands) Peter van Merksteijn Sr. (Italy) Gabrio Rosa (Italy) Fabio Rosa	Porsche 996 GT3-RS	D	501
11	GT	56	(Germany) Seikel Motorsport	(Canada) Tony Burgess (United States) Philip Collin (Netherlands) Peter van Merksteijn Sr. (Italy) Gabrio Rosa (Italy) Fabio Rosa	Porsche 3.6 L Flat-6	D	501
12	SGS	38	(United States) TPC Racing	(United States) Randy Pobst (United States) Andy Lally (United States) John Littlechild (United States) Marc Bunting (United States) Michael Levitas	Porsche 996 GT3 Cup	H	501
12	SGS	38	(United States) TPC Racing	(United States) Randy Pobst (United States) Andy Lally (United States) John Littlechild (United States) Marc Bunting (United States) Michael Levitas	Porsche 3.6 L Flat-6	H	501
13	SGS	71	(Canada) Doncaster Racing	(Canada) Dave Lacey (Canada) Greg Wilkins (United States) Tom Nastasi (Canada) Mark Wilkins (Canada) Ken Wilden	Porsche 996 GT3 Cup	H	494
13	SGS	71	(Canada) Doncaster Racing	(Canada) Dave Lacey (Canada) Greg Wilkins (United States) Tom Nastasi (Canada) Mark Wilkins (Canada) Ken Wilden	Porsche 3.6 L Flat-6	H	494
14	GT	66	(United States) The Racer's Group/Monster Cable	(United States) Kevin Buckler (Germany) Timo Bernhard (United States) Patrick Long (Germany) Jörg Bergmeister	Porsche 996 GT3-RS	D	494
14	GT	66	(United States) The Racer's Group/Monster Cable	(United States) Kevin Buckler (Germany) Timo Bernhard (United States) Patrick Long (Germany) Jörg Bergmeister	Porsche 3.6 L Flat-6	D	494
15	SGS	41	(United States) Orison-Planet Earth Motorsports	(United States) Joe Nonnamaker (United States) Will Nonnamaker (United States) Wayne Nonnamaker (United States) Paul Menard (United States) Charlie Menard	Porsche 996 GT3 Cup	H	493
15	SGS	41	(United States) Orison-Planet Earth Motorsports	(United States) Joe Nonnamaker (United States) Will Nonnamaker (United States) Wayne Nonnamaker (United States) Paul Menard (United States) Charlie Menard	Porsche 3.6 L Flat-6	H	493
16	GT	72	(United States) Jack Lewis Enterprises Ltd.	(United States) Jack Lewis (United States) Tom McGlynn (Puerto Rico) Manuel Matos (Puerto Rico) Edison Lluch	Porsche 996 GT3 Cup	D	492
16	GT	72	(United States) Jack Lewis Enterprises Ltd.	(United States) Jack Lewis (United States) Tom McGlynn (Puerto Rico) Manuel Matos (Puerto Rico) Edison Lluch	Porsche 3.6 L Flat-6	D	492
17	GT	67	(United States) The Racer's Group/Monster Cable	(United Kingdom) Robert Nearn (Germany) Pierre Ehret (United States) Jim Matthews (Denmark) Lars Nielsen (France) Cyrille Sauvage	Porsche 996 GT3-RS	D	492
17	GT	67	(United States) The Racer's Group/Monster Cable	(United Kingdom) Robert Nearn (Germany) Pierre Ehret (United States) Jim Matthews (Denmark) Lars Nielsen (France) Cyrille Sauvage	Porsche 3.6 L Flat-6	D	492
18	GT	83	(United Kingdom) Cirtek Motorsport	(New Zealand) Rob Wilson (United Kingdom) Frank Mountain (United Kingdom) Martyn Konig	Porsche 996 GT3-RS	D	491
18	GT	83	(United Kingdom) Cirtek Motorsport	(New Zealand) Rob Wilson (United Kingdom) Frank Mountain (United Kingdom) Martyn Konig	Porsche 3.6 L Flat-6	D	491
19	SGS	13	(United States) Foxhill Racing	(United States) Andrew Davis (United States) Michael Cawley (United States) Charles Espenlaub (United States) Joe Foster	Porsche 996 GT3 Cup	H	491
19	SGS	13	(United States) Foxhill Racing	(United States) Andrew Davis (United States) Michael Cawley (United States) Charles Espenlaub (United States) Joe Foster	Porsche 3.6 L Flat-6	H	491
20	SGS	16	(United States) AASCO Motorsports	(United States) Craig Stanton (United States) David Murry (United Kingdom) Tim Sugden	Porsche 996 GT3 Cup	H	487
20	SGS	16	(United States) AASCO Motorsports	(United States) Craig Stanton (United States) David Murry (United Kingdom) Tim Sugden	Porsche 3.6 L Flat-6	H	487
21	GT	68	(United States) The Racer's Group/Monster Cable	(United Kingdom) Ian James (United States) Chris Gleason (United States) R. J. Valentine (United States) Bohdan Kroczek (United States) Abraham Zimroth	Porsche 996 GT3-RS	D	487
21	GT	68	(United States) The Racer's Group/Monster Cable	(United Kingdom) Ian James (United States) Chris Gleason (United States) R. J. Valentine (United States) Bohdan Kroczek (United States) Abraham Zimroth	Porsche 3.6 L Flat-6	D	487
22	SGS	63	(United States) Glenn Yee Motorsports	(United States) Hugh Plumb (United States) Michael Lewis (United States) Kim Wolfkill (United States) Geoff Escalette	Porsche 996 GT3 Cup	H	482
22	SGS	63	(United States) Glenn Yee Motorsports	(United States) Hugh Plumb (United States) Michael Lewis (United States) Kim Wolfkill (United States) Geoff Escalette	Porsche 3.6 L Flat-6	H	482
23	SGS	47	(United States) Michael Baughman Racing	(United States) Michael Baughman (United States) Bob Ward (United States) Brad Jaeger (United States) Frank Del Vecchio	Porsche 996 GT3 Cup	H	482
23	SGS	47	(United States) Michael Baughman Racing	(United States) Michael Baughman (United States) Bob Ward (United States) Brad Jaeger (United States) Frank Del Vecchio	Porsche 3.6 L Flat-6	H	482
24	GT	98	(United States) GT Technologies	(United States) Ronald Zitza (United States) Bill Riddell (United States) Hartmut Von Seelen (United States) Carlos de Quesada (United States) Marc Feinstein	Porsche 996 GT3 Cup	D	481
24	GT	98	(United States) GT Technologies	(United States) Ronald Zitza (United States) Bill Riddell (United States) Hartmut Von Seelen (United States) Carlos de Quesada (United States) Marc Feinstein	Porsche 3.6 L Flat-6	D	481
25	DP	80	(United States) G&W Motorsports	(Canada) Hugo Guenette (United States) Jason Workman (United States) Steve Marshall (United States) Danny Marshall (Italy) Fabio Spatafora	Picchio DP2	G	466
25	DP	80	(United States) G&W Motorsports	(Canada) Hugo Guenette (United States) Jason Workman (United States) Steve Marshall (United States) Danny Marshall (Italy) Fabio Spatafora	BMW 4.9 L V8	G	466
26	GT	30	(United States) Risi Competizione	(United States) Anthony Lazzaro (Germany) Ralf Kelleners (Italy) Matteo Bobbi	Maserati Trofeo Light	D	462
26	GT	30	(United States) Risi Competizione	(United States) Anthony Lazzaro (Germany) Ralf Kelleners (Italy) Matteo Bobbi	Maserati 4.2 L V8	D	462
27	SGS	82	(United States) dds Racing	(United States) Steven Lynn (United States) Jack Henricks (United States) Jim Brillhart (United States) Terry Heath	Porsche 996 GT3 Cup	H	461
27	SGS	82	(United States) dds Racing	(United States) Steven Lynn (United States) Jack Henricks (United States) Jim Brillhart (United States) Terry Heath	Porsche 3.6 L Flat-6	H	461
28 DNF	DP	4	(United States) Howard-Boss Motorsports	(United States) Butch Leitzinger (United States) Elliott Forbes-Robinson (United States) Jimmie Johnson (United States) David Brule	Crawford DP03	G	456
28 DNF	DP	4	(United States) Howard-Boss Motorsports	(United States) Butch Leitzinger (United States) Elliott Forbes-Robinson (United States) Jimmie Johnson (United States) David Brule	Chevrolet LS6 5.5 L V8	G	456
29	SGS	00	(United States) Team Vision	(United States) Dwain Derment (United States) Dough Baron (United States) Dennis Puddester (United States) Steven Bernheim	Porsche 996 GT3 Cup	H	454
29	SGS	00	(United States) Team Vision	(United States) Dwain Derment (United States) Dough Baron (United States) Dennis Puddester (United States) Steven Bernheim	Porsche 3.6 L Flat-6	H	454
30	SGS	14	(United States) Autometrics Motorsports	(United States) Cory Friedman (United States) Lynn Wilson (United States) Bransen Patch (United States) Adam Merzon (United States) Mike Smith	Porsche 996 GT3 Cup	H	449
30	SGS	14	(United States) Autometrics Motorsports	(United States) Cory Friedman (United States) Lynn Wilson (United States) Bransen Patch (United States) Adam Merzon (United States) Mike Smith	Porsche 3.6 L Flat-6	H	449
31	SGS	86	(United States) G&W Motorsports	(United States) Tracy Krohn (United States) Ron Forristall (United States) Mae Van Wijk (United States) Andres van der Dys (Italy) Armando Trentini	Porsche 996 GT3 Cup	H	443
31	SGS	86	(United States) G&W Motorsports	(United States) Tracy Krohn (United States) Ron Forristall (United States) Mae Van Wijk (United States) Andres van der Dys (Italy) Armando Trentini	Porsche 3.6 L Flat-6	H	443
32	GT	94	(Italy) Mastercar	(Italy) Mauro Casadei (Switzerland) François Labhardt (Austria) Manfred Jurasz (United States) Jim Michaelian	Ferrari 360 Modena	D	439
32	GT	94	(Italy) Mastercar	(Italy) Mauro Casadei (Switzerland) François Labhardt (Austria) Manfred Jurasz (United States) Jim Michaelian	Ferrari 3.6 L V8	D	439
33	GT	57	(United States) Stevenson Motorsports/Auto Assets	(United States) Chip Vance (United Kingdom) Piers Masarati (United States) John Stevenson (United States) John Buttermore	Porsche 996 GT3-RS	D	428
33	GT	57	(United States) Stevenson Motorsports/Auto Assets	(United States) Chip Vance (United Kingdom) Piers Masarati (United States) John Stevenson (United States) John Buttermore	Porsche 3.6 L Flat-6	D	428
34	GT	24	(United States) Specter Werkes/Sports	(United States) Tom Bambard (United States) Pete Halsmer (United States) John Heinricy (United States) Jeff Nowicki	Chevrolet Corvette C5	D	407
34	GT	24	(United States) Specter Werkes/Sports	(United States) Tom Bambard (United States) Pete Halsmer (United States) John Heinricy (United States) Jeff Nowicki	Chevrolet LS6 5.7 L V8	D	407
35	DP	09	(United States) Spirit of Daytona Racing	(United States) Doug Goad (United States) Robby Gordon (Venezuela) Milka Duno (France) Stéphane Grégoire	Crawford DP03	G	401
35	DP	09	(United States) Spirit of Daytona Racing	(United States) Doug Goad (United States) Robby Gordon (Venezuela) Milka Duno (France) Stéphane Grégoire	Pontiac LS6 5.5 L V8	G	401
36 DNF	GT	93	(Italy) Mastercar	(Italy) Luca Drudi (Italy) Ferdinando Monfardini (Italy) Matteo Meneghello (United States) Joe Colasacco (United States) Ross Fonferko	Ferrari 360 Modena Challenge	D	388
36 DNF	GT	93	(Italy) Mastercar	(Italy) Luca Drudi (Italy) Ferdinando Monfardini (Italy) Matteo Meneghello (United States) Joe Colasacco (United States) Ross Fonferko	Ferrari 3.6 L V8	D	388
37 DNF	GT	33	(United States) Scuderia Ferrari of Washington	(Italy) Fabrizio de Simone (United States) Stephen Earle (United States) Emil Assentato (United States) Nick Longhi	Maserati Trofeo Light	D	384
37 DNF	GT	33	(United States) Scuderia Ferrari of Washington	(Italy) Fabrizio de Simone (United States) Stephen Earle (United States) Emil Assentato (United States) Nick Longhi	Maserati 4.2 L V8	D	384
38	SGS	46	(United States) Michael Baughman Racing	(United States) Peter Argetsinger (United States) Mark Patterson (United States) John Pew (United States) Jim Victor (United States) Dario Cioti	Chevrolet Corvette Z06	H	369
38	SGS	46	(United States) Michael Baughman Racing	(United States) Peter Argetsinger (United States) Mark Patterson (United States) John Pew (United States) Jim Victor (United States) Dario Cioti	Chevrolet 5.7 L V8	H	369
39	SGS	17	(United States) AASCO Motorsports	(United States) Joe Kunz (United States) Derek Clark (United States) Gary Becker (United States) Patrick Flanagan (United States) Mark Webber	Porsche 996 GT3 Cup	H	366
39	SGS	17	(United States) AASCO Motorsports	(United States) Joe Kunz (United States) Derek Clark (United States) Gary Becker (United States) Patrick Flanagan (United States) Mark Webber	Porsche 3.6 L Flat-6	H	366
40 DNF	DP	7	(United States) Southard Motorsports	(United States) Shane Lewis (United States) George Robinson (United States) Jack Baldwin (United States) Vic Rice (United States) Stephen Southard	Fabcar FDSC/03	G	359
40 DNF	DP	7	(United States) Southard Motorsports	(United States) Shane Lewis (United States) George Robinson (United States) Jack Baldwin (United States) Vic Rice (United States) Stephen Southard	BMW 4.9 L V8	G	359
41 DNF	DP	59	(United States) Brumos Racing	(United States) J. C. France (United States) Hurley Haywood (United States) Scott Sharp (United States) Tommy Riggins	Fabcar FDSC/03	G	343
41 DNF	DP	59	(United States) Brumos Racing	(United States) J. C. France (United States) Hurley Haywood (United States) Scott Sharp (United States) Tommy Riggins	Porsche 3.6 L Flat-6	G	343
42 DNF	DP	5	(United States) Essex Racing	(Canada) Scott Maxwell (United States) Joe Pruskowski (United States) Justin Pruskowski (Canada) Ross Bentley	Multimatic MDP1	G	335
42 DNF	DP	5	(United States) Essex Racing	(Canada) Scott Maxwell (United States) Joe Pruskowski (United States) Justin Pruskowski (Canada) Ross Bentley	Ford 5.0 L V8	G	335
43 DNF	DP	70	(United States) SpeedSource	(Canada) Sylvain Tremblay (United States) Selby Wellman (United Kingdom) Chris Hall (United States) Larry Huang	Multimatic MDP1	G	304
43 DNF	DP	70	(United States) SpeedSource	(Canada) Sylvain Tremblay (United States) Selby Wellman (United Kingdom) Chris Hall (United States) Larry Huang	Ford 5.0 L V8	G	304
44 DNF	DP	9	(United States) Mears Motorcoach/SpeedSource	(United States) Mike Borkowski (United States) Paul Mears Jr. (Netherlands) Arie Luyendyk Jr. (United States) Nick Ham (United Kingdom) Justin Bell	Multimatic MDP1	G	289
44 DNF	DP	9	(United States) Mears Motorcoach/SpeedSource	(United States) Mike Borkowski (United States) Paul Mears Jr. (Netherlands) Arie Luyendyk Jr. (United States) Nick Ham (United Kingdom) Justin Bell	Ford 5.0 L V8	G	289
45 DNF	GT	22	(United States) Prototype Technology Group, Inc.	(Sweden) Niclas Jönsson (United States) Boris Said (United States) Joey Hand (United States) Justin Marks (United States) Bill Auberlen	BMW M3 E46	D	267
45 DNF	GT	22	(United States) Prototype Technology Group, Inc.	(Sweden) Niclas Jönsson (United States) Boris Said (United States) Joey Hand (United States) Justin Marks (United States) Bill Auberlen	BMW 3.2 L I6	D	267
46 DNF	GT	97	(United Kingdom) Graham Nash Motorsports	(United States) Robert Orcutt (United States) Kurt Thiel (United States) Ken Dobson (United States) Paul Jenkins	Porsche 996 GT3-RS	D	261
46 DNF	GT	97	(United Kingdom) Graham Nash Motorsports	(United States) Robert Orcutt (United States) Kurt Thiel (United States) Ken Dobson (United States) Paul Jenkins	Porsche 3.6 L Flat-6	D	261
47	GT	60	(United States) Xtreme Racing Group	(United States) Anthony Puleo (Switzerland) Robert Dubler (United States) Squeak Kennedy (United States) Joe Evans	Chevrolet Corvette	D	193
47	GT	60	(United States) Xtreme Racing Group	(United States) Anthony Puleo (Switzerland) Robert Dubler (United States) Squeak Kennedy (United States) Joe Evans	Chevrolet 6.1 L V8	D	193
48 DNF	DP	45	(United States) Gunnar Racing	(United States) Gunnar Jeannette (United States) Mike Brockman (United States) Paul Newman (United States) Kyle Petty	Fabcar FDSC/03	G	185
48 DNF	DP	45	(United States) Gunnar Racing	(United States) Gunnar Jeannette (United States) Mike Brockman (United States) Paul Newman (United States) Kyle Petty	Porsche 3.6 L Flat-6	G	185
49 DNF	GT	21	(United States) Prototype Technology Group, Inc.	(Sweden) Niclas Jönsson (United States) Boris Said (United States) Joey Hand (United States) Justin Marks (United States) Bill Auberlen	BMW M3 E46	D	162
49 DNF	GT	21	(United States) Prototype Technology Group, Inc.	(Sweden) Niclas Jönsson (United States) Boris Said (United States) Joey Hand (United States) Justin Marks (United States) Bill Auberlen	BMW 3.2 L I6	D	162
50 DNF	DP	58	(United States) Brumos Racing	(United States) David Donohue (United States) Darren Law (Germany) Lucas Luhr (Germany) Sascha Maassen	Fabcar FDSC/03	G	150
50 DNF	DP	58	(United States) Brumos Racing	(United States) David Donohue (United States) Darren Law (Germany) Lucas Luhr (Germany) Sascha Maassen	Porsche 3.6 L Flat-6	G	150
51 DNF	DP	15	(United States) Essex Racing	(United States) Dave Gaylord (United States) Don Kitch Jr. (United States) John Olsen (United States) Tom Hessert Jr. (United States) Tom Hessert III	Multimatic MDP1	G	149
51 DNF	DP	15	(United States) Essex Racing	(United States) Dave Gaylord (United States) Don Kitch Jr. (United States) John Olsen (United States) Tom Hessert Jr. (United States) Tom Hessert III	Ford 5.0 L V8	G	149
52 DNF	GT	11	(United States) JMB Racing	(Switzerland) Iradj Alexander (Italy) Diego Alessi (Italy) Edy Gay (Italy) Maurizio Mediani (United States) Paul Dana	Ferrari 360 Modena	D	98
52 DNF	GT	11	(United States) JMB Racing	(Switzerland) Iradj Alexander (Italy) Diego Alessi (Italy) Edy Gay (Italy) Maurizio Mediani (United States) Paul Dana	Ferrari 3.6 L V8	D	98
53 DNF	GT	88	(Portugal) ASM Team	(Portugal) Pedro Couceiro (Portugal) Miguel Amaral (Portugal) Manuel Gião (Portugal) Carlos Barbot	Porsche 996 GT3-RS	D	65
53 DNF	GT	88	(Portugal) ASM Team	(Portugal) Pedro Couceiro (Portugal) Miguel Amaral (Portugal) Manuel Gião (Portugal) Carlos Barbot	Porsche 3.6 L Flat-6	D	65
