= John Graham (racing driver) =

Canadian racing driver (1955–2025)

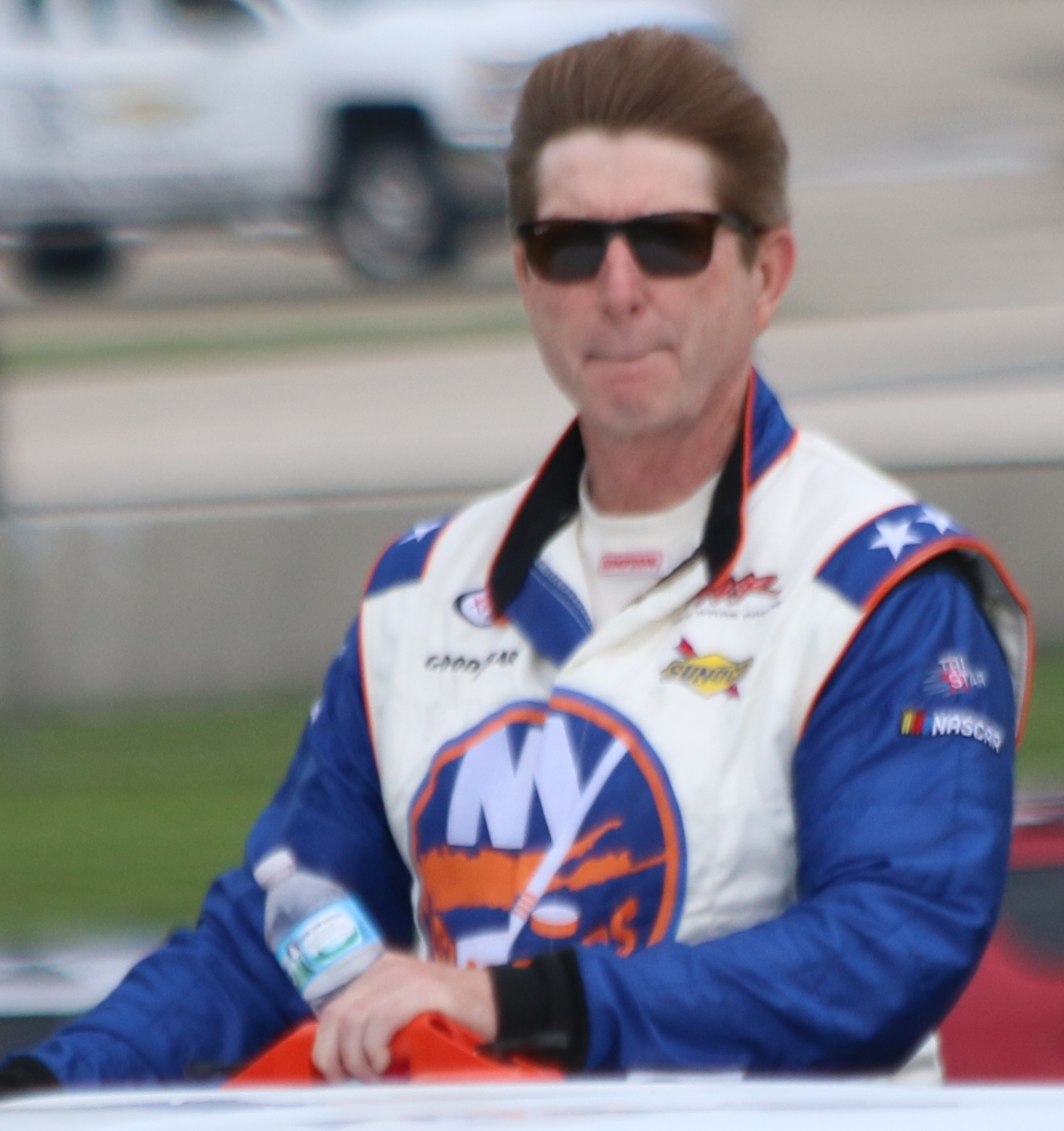
- Graham at Road America in 2017
- Born: John Samuel Graham; 22 October 1955; Belfast, Northern Ireland
- Died: 12 October 2025 (aged 69); Newmarket, Ontario, Canada

NASCAR O'Reilly Auto Parts Series career
- 14 races run over 3 years
- 2017 position: 65th
- Best finish: 65th (2017)
- First race: 2004 Kroger 200 (IRP)
- Last race: 2017 Ford EcoBoost 300 (Homestead)
Wins	Top tens	Poles
0	0	0
- Statistics up to date as of June 16, 2020.

John Samuel Graham (22 October 1955 – 12 October 2025) was a Canadian professional racing driver. He drove in numerous road racing series such as IMSA. He also had experience in NASCAR.

== Racing career ==
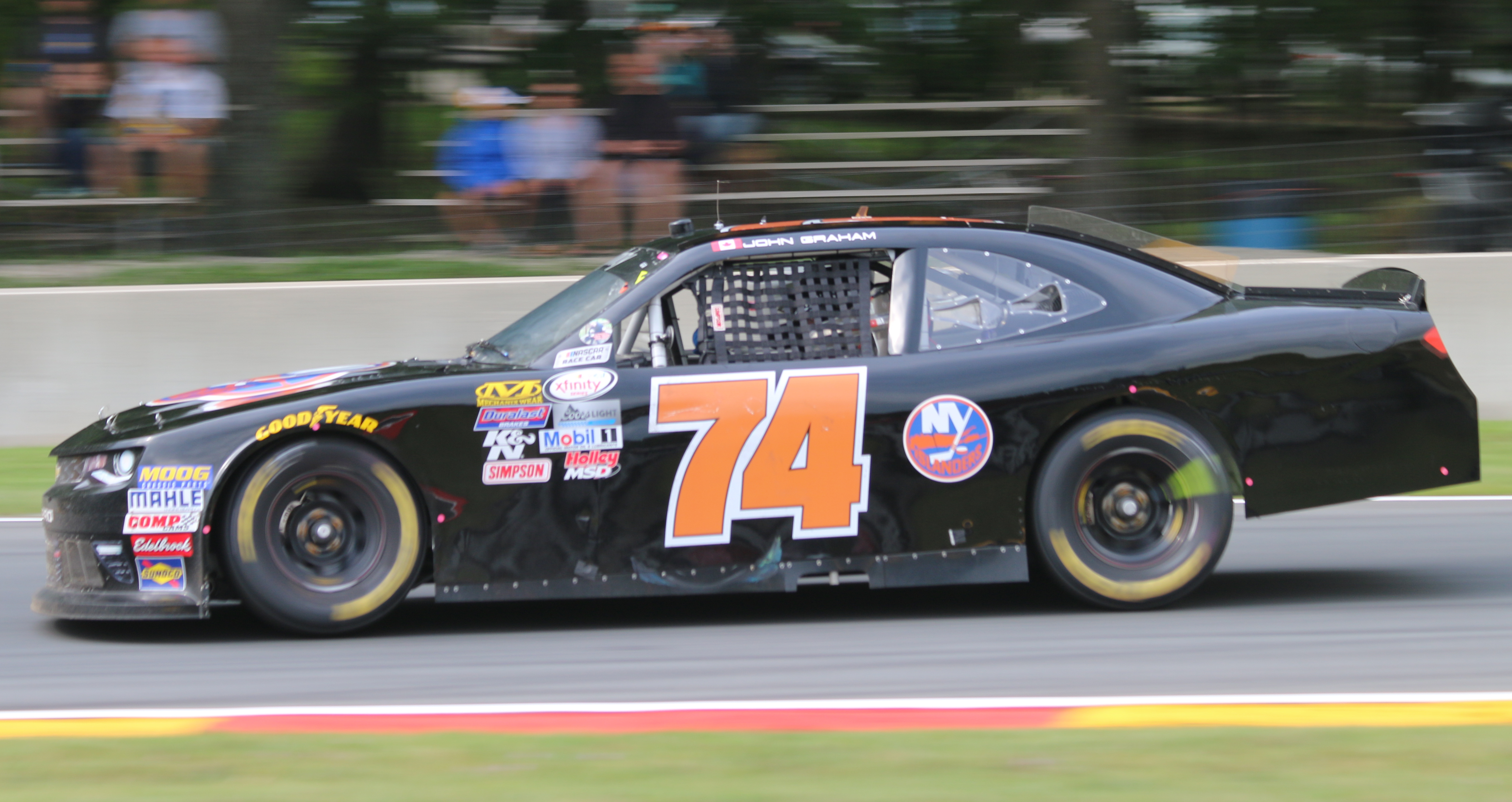
Graham's No. 74 in the Road America Xfinity Series race in 2017

In 1981, Graham began his career in the Can-Am series' U2 (under 2-litre) class. In 1982, he joined Gordon Lightfoot driving the Lightfoot Racing March 811 Cosworth. In 1983, he joined Aston Martin driving the "Nimrod" at the 24 hours of Daytona. Over his career, he has driven IMSA, WSC, Indy Lights, F2, ALMS, Grand-Am, ARCA, NASCAR Nationwide Series as well as in the Paris-Dakar Rally Raid. He had nine starts at the 24 Hours of Le Mans, with an LMP675 class win in 2000 with Canadian team Multimatic Motorsports. His podium finishes include the 24 Hours of Daytona, 12 Hours of Sebring, and Petit Le Mans.

== Later life and death ==
Graham was inducted into the Canadian Motorsport Hall of Fame in 2021.

Graham died from lung cancer at a hospice in Newmarket, Ontario on 12 October 2025, at the age of 69.

== Motorsports career results ==
=== 24 Hours of Le Mans results ===
Year	Team	Co-Drivers	Car	Class	Laps	Pos.	Class Pos.
1984	(Germany) Obermaier Racing	(Germany) Jürgen Lässig (South Africa) George Fouché	Porsche 956	C1	147	DNF	DNF
1985	(Germany) Team Labatt (Germany) Gebhardt Engineering	(Germany) Frank Jelinski (United Kingdom) Nick Adams	Gebhardt JC853	C2	224	NC	NC
1988	(United Kingdom) PC Automotive	(United States) Olindo Iacobelli (France) Alain Ianette	Argo JM19C	C2	130	DNF	DNF
1998	(Canada) CJ Motorsport	(United States) John Morton (Germany) Harald Grohs	Porsche 911 GT2	LMGT2	164	DNF	DNF
2000	(Canada) Multimatic Motorsports	(Canada) Scott Maxwell (Canada) Greg Wilkins	Lola B2K/40	LMP675	274	25th	**1st**
2001	(United States) Dick Barbour Racing	(Venezuela) Milka Duno (United States) David Murry	Reynard 01Q	LMP675	4	DNF	DNF
2002	(United States) MBD Sportscar Team	(Belgium) Didier de Radiguès (Venezuela) Milka Duno	Panoz LMP07	LMP900	259	DNF	DNF

=== NASCAR ===
(key) (Bold – Pole position awarded by qualifying time. Italics – Pole position earned by points standings or practice time. * – Most laps led.)

==== Xfinity Series ====
NASCAR Xfinity Series results
Year	Team	No.	Make	1	2	3	4	5	6	7	8	9	10	11	12	13	14	15	16	17	18	19	20	21	22	23	24	25	26	27	28	29	30	31	32	33	34	35	NXSC	Pts	Ref
2004	MacDonald Motorsports	72	Chevy	DAY	CAR	LVS	DAR	BRI	TEX	NSH	TAL	CAL	GTY	RCH	NZH	CLT	DOV	NSH	KEN	MLW	DAY	CHI	NHA	PPR	IRP; 31	MCH	BRI	CAL	RCH; 29	DOV	KAN	CLT	MEM; 28	ATL	PHO; 38	DAR	HOM		81st	274	
2007	Braun Racing	10	Toyota	DAY	CAL	MXC	LVS	ATL	BRI	NSH	TEX	PHO	TAL	RCH	DAR	CLT	DOV	NSH	KEN	MLW	NHA	DAY	CHI	GTY	IRP	CGV; 23	GLN; 31	MCH	BRI	CAL									77th	441	
2007	Baker Curb Racing	37	Ford																												RCH; 41	DOV	KAN	CLT	MEM; 27	TEX	PHO; 26	HOM; 31	77th	441	
2017	Rick Ware Racing	74	Chevy	DAY	ATL	LVS	PHO	CAL	TEX	BRI	RCH	TAL	CLT	DOV	POC	MCH	IOW	DAY	KEN	NHA	IND	IOW	GLN	MOH	BRI	ROA; 30	DAR												65th	15	
2017	B. J. McLeod Motorsports	78	Chevy																									RCH; 37	CHI	KEN	DOV	CLT	KAN	TEX	PHO; 31				65th	15	
2017	Mike Harmon Racing	74	Dodge																																	HOM; 38			65th	15	

=== ARCA Re/Max Series ===
(key) (Bold – Pole position awarded by qualifying time. Italics – Pole position earned by points standings or practice time. * – Most laps led.)

ARCA Re/Max Series results
Year	Team	No.	Make	1	2	3	4	5	6	7	8	9	10	11	12	13	14	15	16	17	18	19	20	21	22	23	ARSC	Pts	Ref
2007	Hover Motorsports	72	Ford	DAY	USA	NSH; DNQ	SLM																				57th	475	
2007	Andy Belmont Racing	62	Ford					KAN; 37	WIN; 16	KEN; 27	TOL	IOW	POC	MCH	BLN	KEN; DNQ	POC	NSH; DNQ	ISF	MIL; 24	GTW	DSF	CHI	SLM	TAL; DNQ	TOL	57th	475	
2008	Andy Belmont Racing	14	Ford	DAY	SLM	IOW	KAN	CAR	KEN	TOL	POC; 23	MCH; 41	CAY	KEN	BLN	POC	NSH	ISF	DSF	CHI	SLM	NJE	TAL	TOL			115th	145	
