= Picchio DP2 =

Prototype racing car

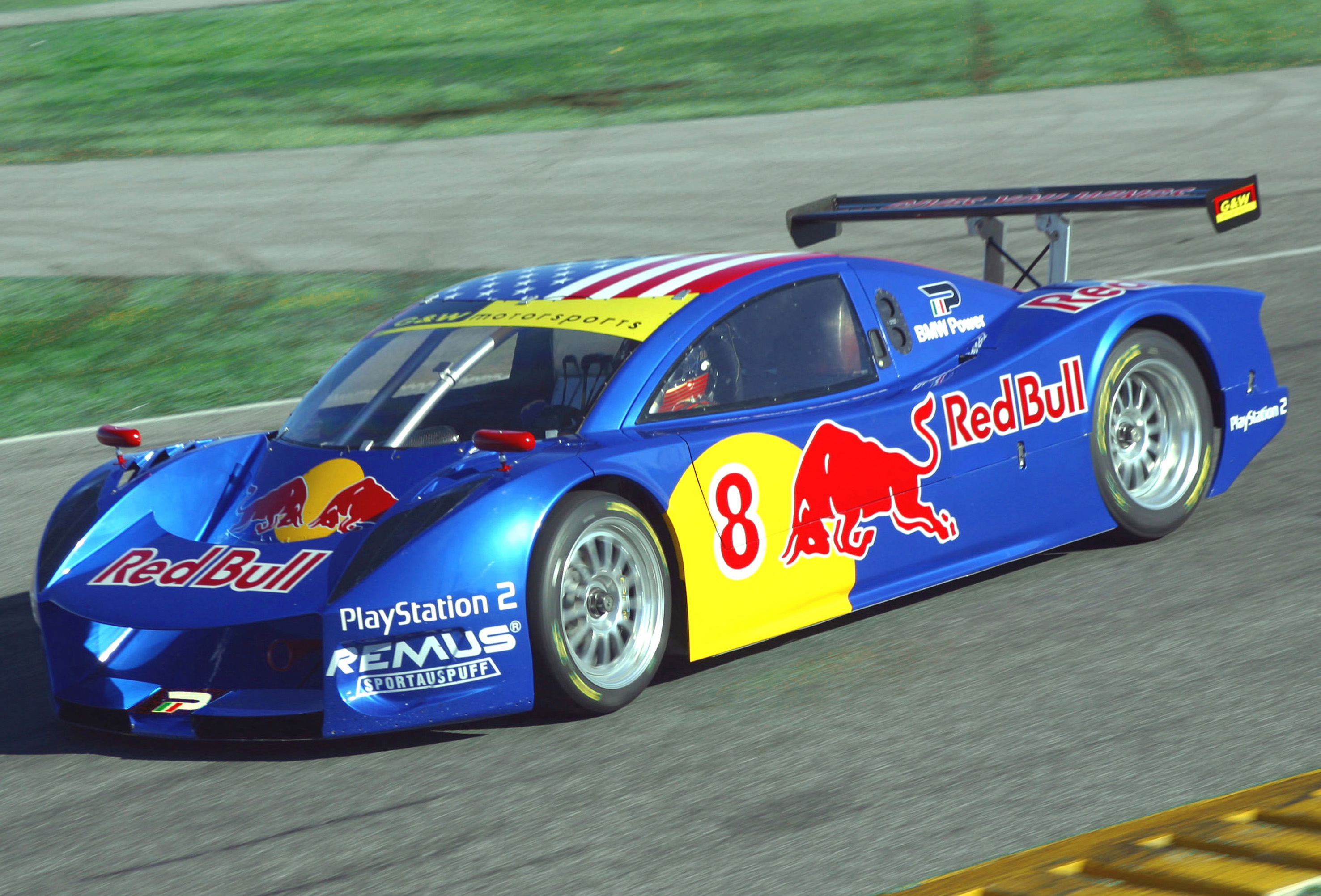
- Category: Daytona Prototype
- Constructor: Picchio Racing Cars

Technical specifications
- Chassis: Hybrid Aluminum Honeycomb & Aluminum Sheet over Steel Tube Monocoque Chassis
- Suspension (front): Unequal A-Arms w/Pull-Rod Activated Ohlins Shock Absorbers & Springs
- Suspension (rear): Unequal A-Arms w/Pull-Rod Activated Ohlins Shock Absorbers & Springs
- Length: 4,480 mm (176.4 in)
- Width: 1,995 mm (78.5 in)
- Height: 1,110 mm (43.7 in)
- Engine: BMW M62 4,941 cc (4.9 L; 301.5 cu in) 32-valve, DOHC V8, naturally-aspirated, mid-mounted
- Transmission: Hewland NLT 6-speed sequential
- Power: 410 kW (557 PS; 550 hp)
- Weight: 900 kg (1,984.2 lb)
- Brakes: Vented Discs w/4-Pot Caliper
- Tyres: Goodyear

Competition history
- Notable entrants: (United States) G&W Motorsports (United States) Synergy Racing (United States) ADI Motorsports
- Notable drivers: (United States) Darren Law (United States) Boris Said (Austria) Dieter Quester (United States) Andy Lally (United States) Geoff Bodine (United States) Guy Cosmo (United States) Peyton Sellers (United States) Derek Hill
- Debut: 2003 24 Hours of Daytona
- Last event: 2006 VIRginia 400km
Races	Wins	Podiums	Poles
23	0	1	0
- Teams' Championships: 0
- Constructors' Championships: 0
- Drivers' Championships: 0

The Picchio DP2 is a first-generation Daytona Prototype race car, designed, developed and built by Italian manufacturer Picchio, for the Grand-Am Rolex Sports Car Series, in 2003. It was powered by a BMW V8 engine. A total of three cars were built.

An evolution to this car named the DP3, entered development in 2005, with the aim to enter the 2005 Le Mans Series. Upgrades to the suspension, gearbox and overall durability were planned however, this never came to fruition and the car never raced.

== Competition history ==
=== 2003 ===
G&W Motorsports would be the first team to campaign the car in the new rule set. In its debut race at the 2003 24 Hours of Daytona, the car would suffer mechanical gremlins and would finish third in class and 24th overall. It would continue to produce modest results throughout the season but would achieve its highest finish of its racing career at the VIR 400 with third-place finish in class and overall. Darren Law was the highest points finisher for the DP2 with a final position of sixth in the drivers standings. In the chassis championship, the car finished third out of four constructors but was last of the full-time runners. G&W Motorsports finished fourth in the teams standings, also last of full-time entrants.

=== 2004–2006 ===
G&W Motorsports would again run the car in the 2004 Rolex Sports Car Series but would only appear in four races with a best finish of seventh in class and 25th overall at the 2004 24 Hours of Daytona.

In 2005, G&W Motorpsorts rebranded their team to become Synergy Racing and ran the car at the 24 Hours of Daytona but ran into gearbox problems and finished 60th overall. The car was on the entry lists for four more races but did not appear in any sessions. It would contend in one final race at the penultimate round of the 2005 Rolex Sports Car Series at VIR in the hands of ADI Motorsports finishing 40th overall.

In 2006, there were plans for at least one car to be on the grid for the first race of the season at Daytona but, the team withdrew before the race. ADI Motorsports continued to run the car in 2006 and contested in three races. In those three races they compiled a best finish of 37th and two retirements. After the VIR round the car did not appear in any more races.
