= Grandam =

Grandam may refer to:

- grandparent
- Grand-Am, an auto racing sanctioning body established in 1999 to organize road racing competitions in North America
- Grande dame, a stock character, usually an elderly high-society socialite
