= Proto-Auto Lola B08/70 =

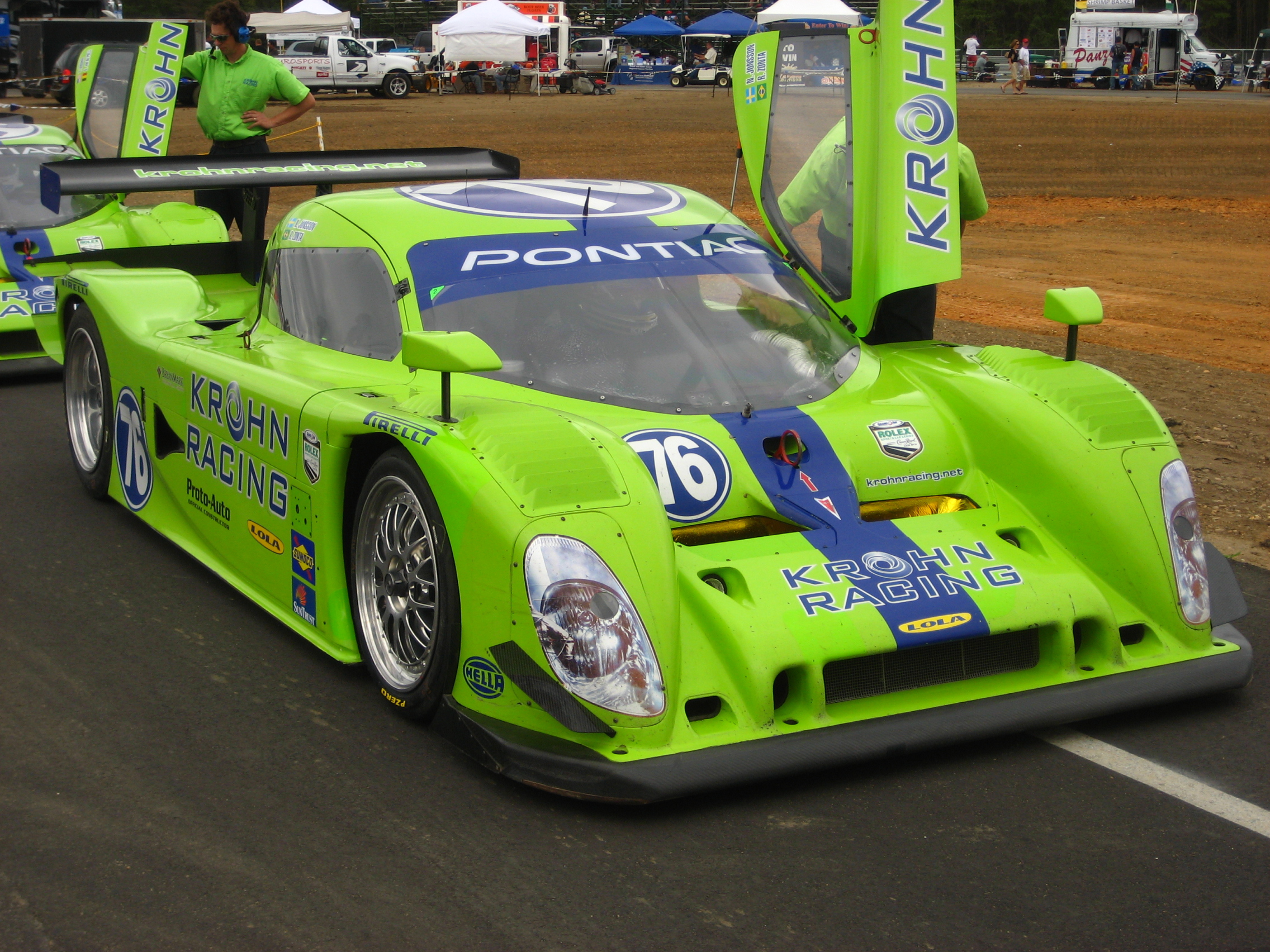
- Category: Daytona Prototype
- Constructor: Lola Cars International
- Designer: Julian Sole
- Predecessor: Multimatic MDP1

Technical specifications
- Chassis: Carbon fibre monocoque
- Suspension (front): Double wishbone, push-rod actuated coil springs over dampers
- Suspension (rear): Double wishbone, push-rod actuated coil springs over dampers
- Axle track: 65.25 in (1,657.3 mm) (Front); 64.75 in (1,644.6 mm) (Rear)
- Wheelbase: 109.8 in (2,788.9 mm)
- Engine: Pontiac/Ford 5.0 litre V8 naturally aspirated, mid-engined, longitudinally mounted
- Transmission: X-Trac 5-speed or 6-speed sequential manual
- Weight: Appr. 900 kg (2,000 lb)
- Fuel: Sunoco
- Tyres: Pirelli

Competition history
- Notable entrants: (United States) Krohn Racing (United States) Dyson Racing
- Notable drivers: (United States) Tracy Krohn; (Belgium) Eric van de Poele; (Sweden) Nic Jönsson; (Brazil) Ricardo Zonta; (United Kingdom) Oliver Gavin; (United Kingdom) Darren Turner
- Debut: 2008 GAINSCO Grand Prix of Miami
- First win: 2009 Verizon Wireless 250
- Last win: 2009 Crown Royal 200 at the Glen
- Last event: 2013 Grand-Am of The Americas
Races	Wins	Podiums	Poles	F/Laps
39	2	5	2	1
- Constructors' Championships: 0
- Drivers' Championships: 0

The Proto-Auto Lola B08/70 is a Daytona Prototype sports car built in 2008 by Lola Cars and sold by Proto-Auto LLC.

It was débuted by Krohn Racing at the GAINSCO Grand Prix of Miami, the second round of the 2008 Rolex Sports Car Series season, after Krohn Racing has used the previous year's Riley at the 24 Hours of Daytona. Originally powered by a Pontiac 5.0 litre V8 engine, it received a new Ford "Cammer" for 2009, producing 500 hp (370 kW).

The car scored its first win at the 2009 Verizon Wireless 250 at the Thunderbolt Raceway, with Niclas Jönsson and Ricardo Zonta at the wheel.
