= Picchio Racing Cars =

Coordinates: 42.8519509°N 13.729149°E

- Company type: Auto racing design and production
- Founded: 1989
- Founder: Giotto Bizzarrini
- Headquarters: Ancarano, Teramo, Italy
- Key people: Francesco Di Pietrantonio (president); Armando Trentini (North American distributor)
- Total assets: €1,434,510.96
- Website: picchio.com/en

Picchio Racing Cars is a small Italian racing and road automobile manufacturer, based in the town of Ancarano, Teramo.

== History ==
Founded in 1989 by Giotto Bizzarrini, Picchio built their first car, the SR2, in 1998. Also known as the A001 or the MB1, the SR2 used a 3-litre BMW straight-6 engine, and made its debut at the Misano round of the International Sports Racing Series in July 1998. In 2002, the firm gave Armando Trentini the exclusivity to introduced the D-USA which, with the collaboration of G&W Motorsports (now Synergy Racing), was used in the SRPII category of the Rolex Sports Car Series; Darren Law took second in the SRPII championship that year whilst driving a D-USA. the team also had one victory at the six hours of Mont Trembland Canada (drivers Daren Law, Andy Lally, Armando Trentini). In 2003, Trentini and G&W Motorsports introduced the DP2, which was built for the new Daytona Prototype class of Grand-Am. On its debut, the DP2 finished 24th in the 24 Hours of Daytona. Darren Law was the most successful DP2 driver, and he took sixth in the Daytona Prototype championship; whilst Steve Marshall won the SRPII championship in a D-USA, and helped give Picchio the SRPII Constructor's championship. A new Daytona Prototype entered development in 2003, but the car, known as the DP3, never actually raced, although Andrea Montermini did test a version of the car. The DP3 would later morph into an Alfa Romeo 8C-based Daytona Prototype, but this too would not materialize.

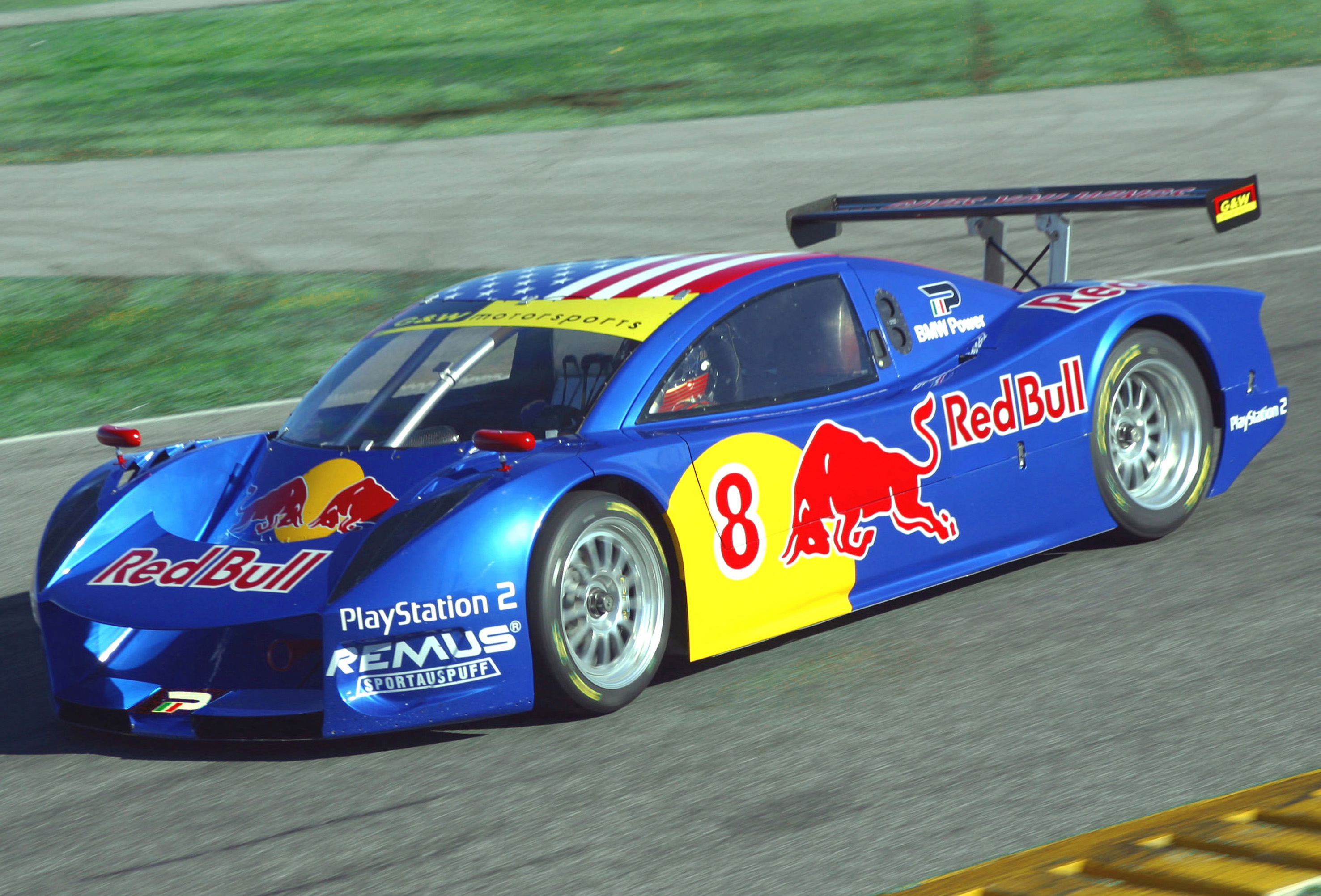
G&W Motorsports' Picchio DP2

In 2004, Picchio introduced a new series of prototypes for hillclimbing; the Light Series. In 2010, Picchio introduced their second hillclimb series, the P4/E2, which used a 1750 cc turbocharged engine. Christian Merliin was selected as the official P4/E2 driver, and he took six wins from seven races. The same year, they introduced the Picchio DANY road car, which was the firm's first entry into the electric city car market, and began life as the Belumbury project in 2008. In 2011, Nicola Guida designed a carbon-fibre bicycle for Picchio.

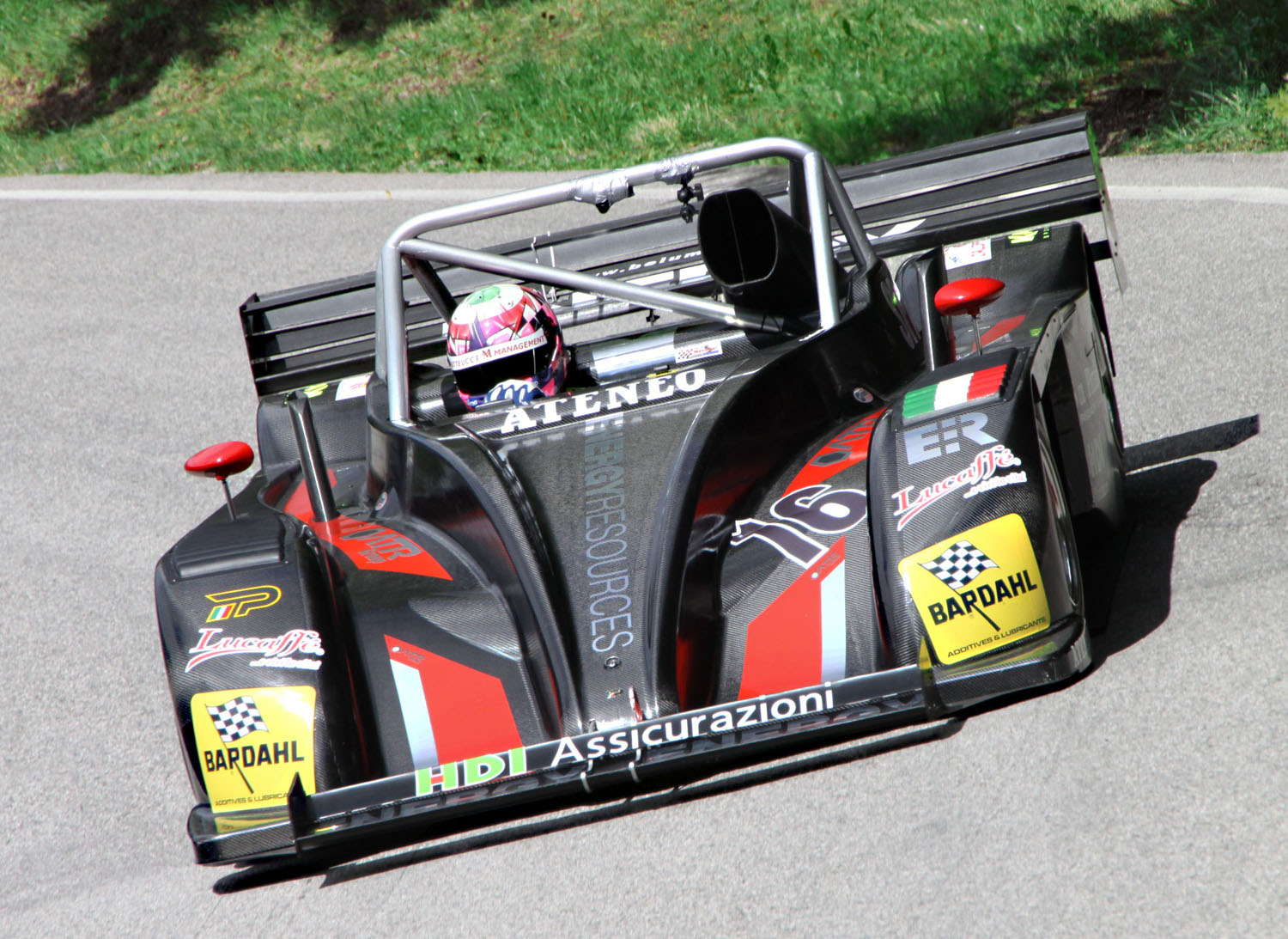
Picchio P4 at Nevegal

== Models ==
- Picchio SR2 (1998)
- Picchio D-USA (2002)
- Picchio DP2 (2003)
- Picchio CN2 Light (2004)
- Picchio DANY (2010)
- Picchio P4/E2 (2010)
- Picchio Evolution GT (2011)
