= Riley Technologies =

American auto racing constructor and team

(United States) Riley Technologies
- Founded: 2001
- Founder(s): Bob Riley; Bill Riley
- Base: Mooresville, North Carolina, United States
- Team principal(s): Bill Riley
- Current series: IMSA SportsCar Championship
- Current drivers: IMSA SportsCar Championship: 63. (Italy) Mirko Bortolotti (France) Romain Grosjean; Daniil Kvyat (Switzerland) Edoardo Mortara; 74. (Brazil) Felipe Fraga (United States) Gar Robinson (Australia) Josh Burdon (Brazil) Felipe Massa
- Website: https://www.rileytech.com/

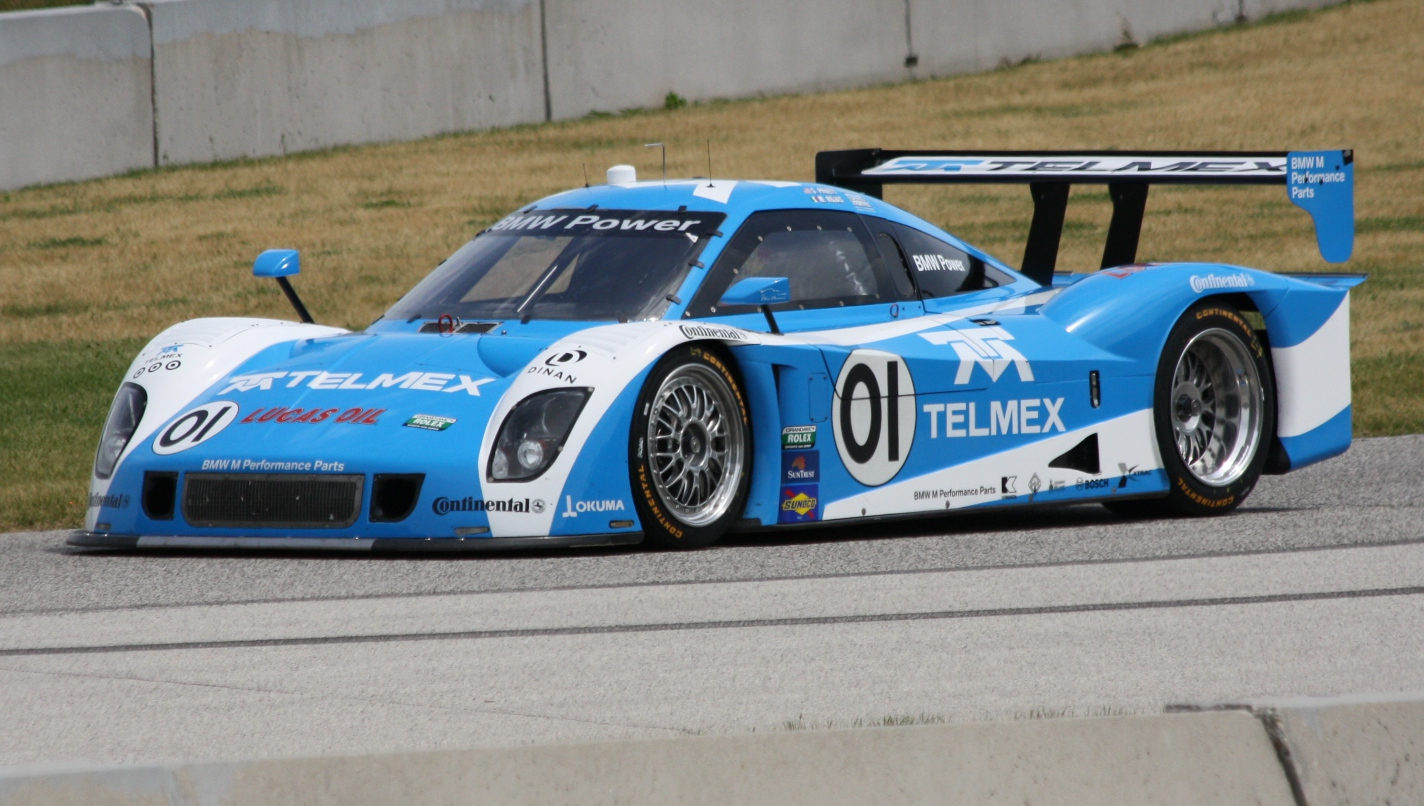
Riley Mk. XXVI of Chip Ganassi Racing in 2012 Rolex Sports Car Series

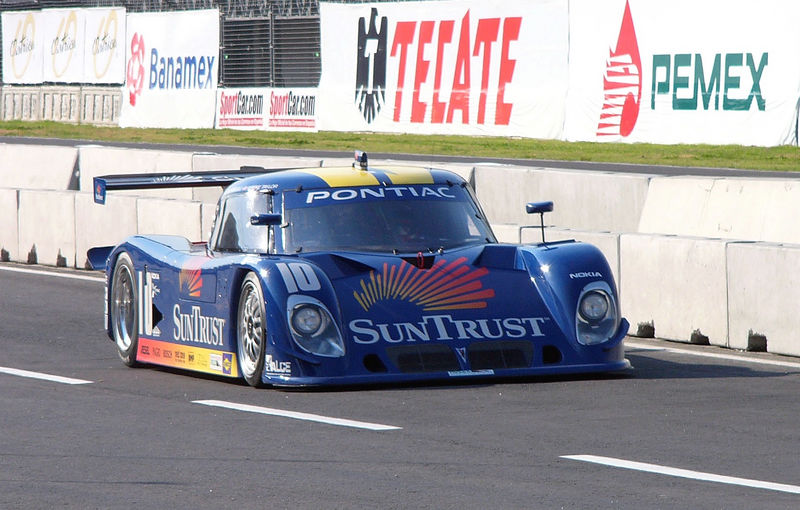
The SunTrust Racing Riley-Pontiac Daytona Prototype seen at the Autódromo Hermanos Rodriguez in 2005

Riley Technologies LLC is an American auto racing constructor and team specializing in the design and manufacture of complete race cars, as well as prototype development for racing and manufacturing applications.

The team currently fields the No. 63 Lamborghini SC63 in the GTP category and the No. 74 Oreca 07 in the LMP2 category of the IMSA SportsCar Championship.

In 2001, Bob Riley and son Bill, formerly of Riley & Scott, formed Riley Technologies. The company moved their headquarters to Mooresville, North Carolina in late 2006.

== Daytona Prototypes ==
Riley Technologies was the leading constructor of the Daytona Prototype chassis for the Grand-Am Rolex Sports Car Series. The Riley chassis was dominant in terms of both numbers of cars on the grid and results.

Riley chassis have won seven 24 Hours of Daytona races with different engines, the 2005 race was won by the SunTrust Racing Pontiac-Riley and 2006, 2007, and 2008 victories went to Chip Ganassi Racing Lexus-powered Rileys. The 2009 race was won by a Brumos Racing Porsche-powered Riley. In the 2010 race, another Porsche-powered Mark XI from Action Express Racing won. The 2011 race was again won by Chip Ganassi Racing, this time with a BMW engine, and in 2015 after the United SportsCar Championship creation, with a Ford engine.

When the United SportsCar Championship was created in 2014, Riley continued as Daytona Prototype supplier, with Gen3 rules adopted to make the cars competitive versus the former ALMS LMP2 cars. The company supplied the Ganassi, GAINSCO/Bob Stallings, Shank and Starworks teams. Ganassi became the only full-time team in 2015, and no full-time entry used Riley chassis in 2016.

In 2017, Riley became one of the four LMP2 and DPi chassis manufacturers with the Riley-Multimatic MkXXX. The car was developed in partnership with Multimatic. Multimatic would take charge over the carbon fiber tub, vehicular bodywork and aerodynamic aspects of the car, whilst Riley would design and manufacture the majority of the mechanical components on the Mk30, including the suspension and assembly of the car.

On 15 June 2017, Multimatic revealed that it had taken the lead role in the Riley-Multimatic LMP2 programme, a departure from the initial shared lead, that had Riley leading the commercial aspects of the LMP2 programme, and Multimatic focusing on the DPi aspect of the programme.

== GTLM and GT3 ==
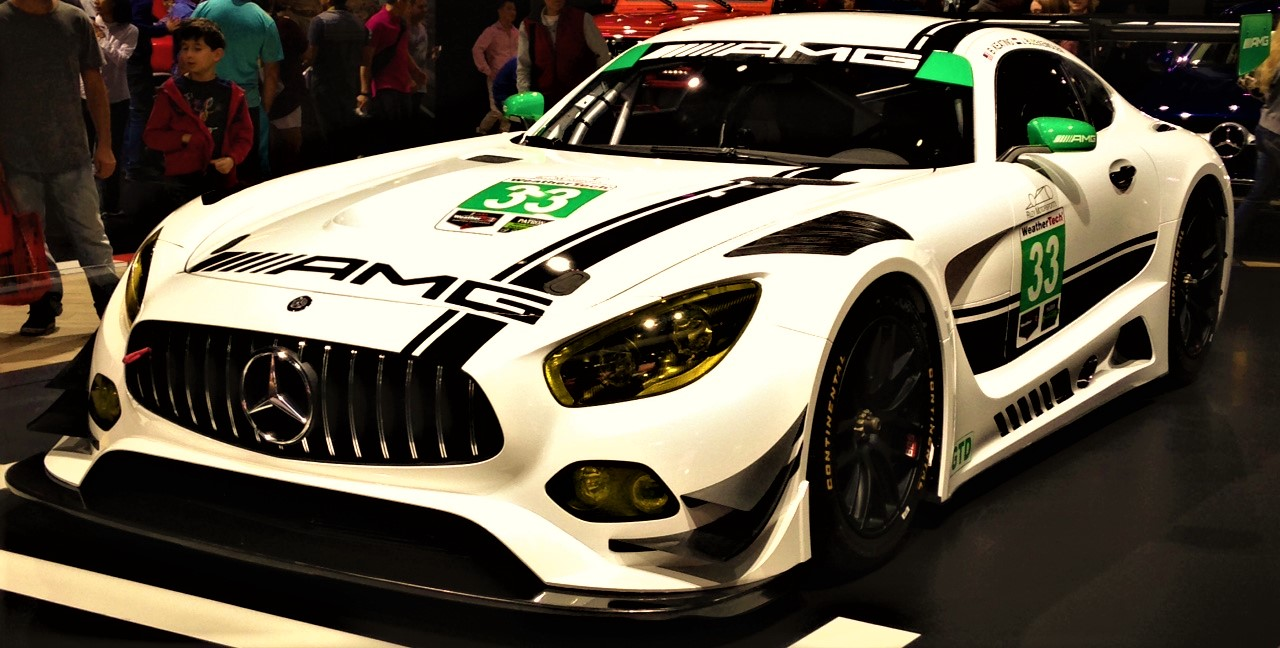
2017 Riley Motorsports Mercedes-AMG GT3 that races in IMSA GT Daytona

Riley developed the Mazda RX-8 chassis for SpeedSource, that won the GT class in the 2008 race. Also unveiled in 2008 was the BMW M6 GT race car, and the GT2-class Chevrolet Corvette Riley built and raced in the 2008 American Le Mans Series. The car also raced at the 2009 Petit Le Mans, where it beat both Corvette Racing factory cars in qualifying.

In 2012, the SRT Viper debuted at the American Le Mans Series GT class, with drivers Dominik Farnbacher, Marc Goossens, Ryan Hunter-Reay, Tommy Kendall, Jonathan Bomarito and Kuno Wittmer. In the 2013 ALMS, the team finished 3rd in the GT class championship. The car made its debut at the Le Mans 24 Hours in 2013, where it finished eighth in class and 24th overall. In 2014, the team entered the IMSA SportsCar Championship GTLM class, winning the teams championship and driver's championship by Kuno Wittmer. Following the end of the 2014 season, Chrysler discontinued the factory program by SRT Motorsports.

The Viper GT3-R was also jointly developed by SRT Motorsports and Riley Technologies. It competed in the IMSA GTD class, the Pirelli World Challenge GT class, and Dutch Supercar Challenge Super GT class.

In 2017, Riley competed in the IMSA GTD class with two customer Mercedes-AMG GT GT3s. The #33 of Ben Keating and Jeroen Bleekemolen was runner-up in the teams championship, whereas the #50 of Cooper MacNeil and Gunnar Jeannette was 9th. In 2018, Keating and Bleekemolen drove a single Mercedes-AMG GT for Riley, placing third in points. In 2019, the duo finished 7th in the overall championship, and won the Endurance Cup.

Riley had Lawson Aschenbach and Gar Robinson as drivers of their single Mercedes-AMG GT for the 2020 IMSA WeatherTech Championship, resulting 7th in the GTD class overall standings.

== Grand Touring Prototype (GTP) ==
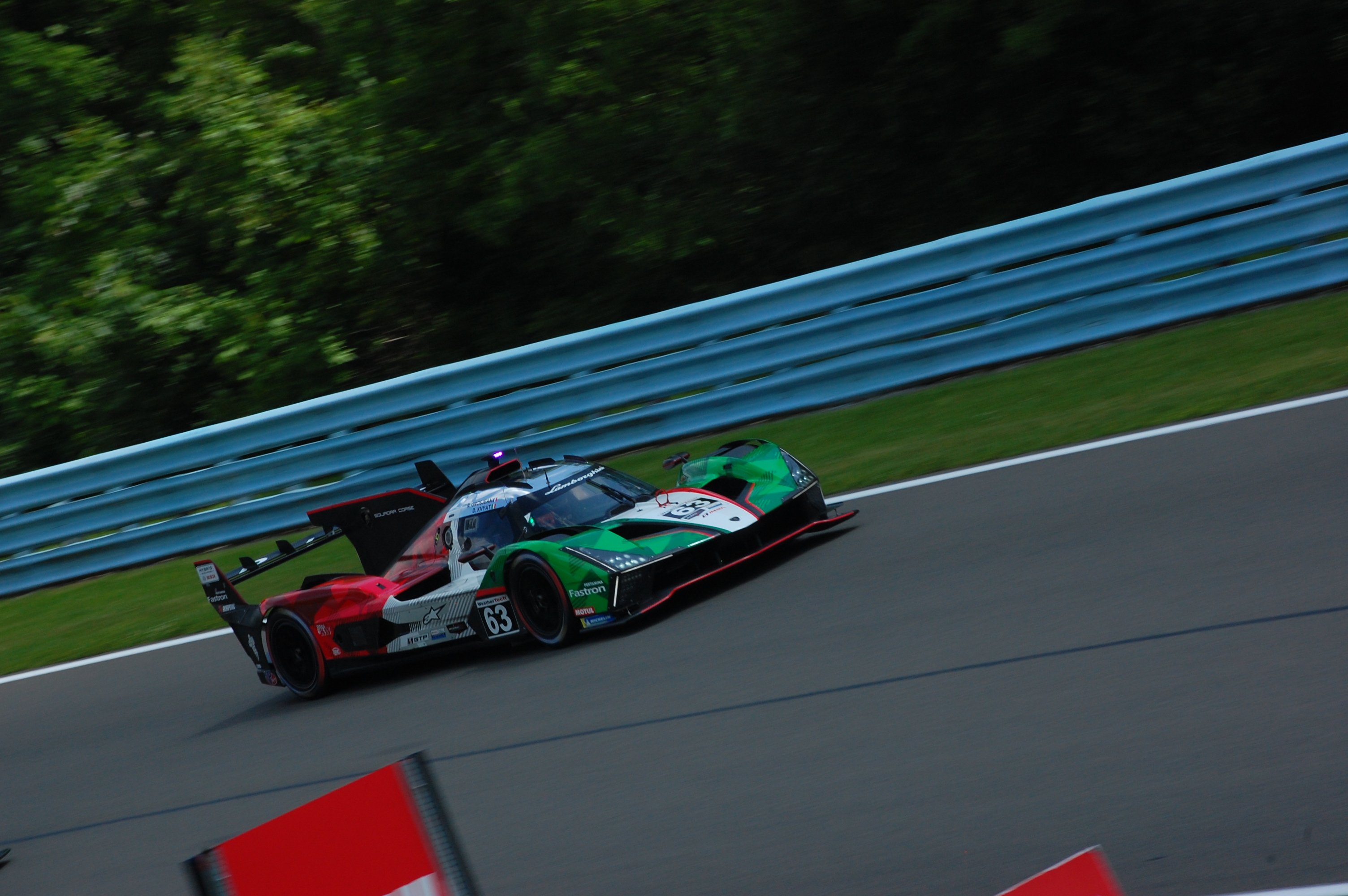
Riley's Lamborghini SC63 at the 2025 Sahlen's Six Hours of the Glen

In 2025, Riley expanded to two entries in the 2025 IMSA SportsCar Championship. In addition to fielding their No. 74 Oreca 07 in the LMP2 class, the team entered the GTP class as the service provider for Lamborghini and their Lamborghini SC63. The team took over the program from Iron Lynx following disputes between the Italian team and Lamborghini. Riley would run the No. 63 Lamborghini SC63 under the Automobili Lamborghini Squadra Corse banner with Lamborghini factory drivers Mirko Bortolotti, Romain Grosjean, Daniil Kvyat, and Edoardo Mortara.

== Other racing ==
A derivative of the Riley Daytona Prototype chassis is also raced in the GT300 class of SuperGT as the Mooncraft Shiden.

In April 2008 Riley Technologies announced plans to build a track day car to meet the growing demand for high-performance vehicles for use at private track facilities. The newest Riley will utilize a mid-engine crate motor with over 500 horsepower (370 kW) and is designed to minimize operating costs normally associated with operating a race car.

Riley Technologies built the Chevrolet Camaro GS.R that competed in the Continental Tire Sports Car Challenge in the early 2010s.

In 2019, Riley entered the IMSA Michelin Pilot Challenge with a Mercedes-AMG GT4 with drivers Jim Cox and Dylan Murry, finishing 6th in points. The duo won the Daytona season opener with Jeroen Bleekemolen as third driver.

Cox and Murry will continue with Riley in 2021, but switching to the LMP3 class of the IMSA WeatherTech Championship.

Riley Technologies, through its associated team entries, has participated in other major endurance events such as the Rolex 24 at Daytona. In the 2026 edition, a Riley‑linked entry under the Myers Riley Motorsports name competed with a four-driver lineup which included Felipe Fraga, Jenson Altzman, Sheena Monk and former Formula One driver Romain Grosjean. The team drove a Ford Mustang GT3, but had to retire early due to severe damage sustained from contact with the Mercedes-AMG GT3 of team 75 Express, which impacted the steering of the car.

== Racing record ==
=== 24 Hours of Le Mans results ===
Year	Entrant	No.	Car	Drivers	Class	Laps	Pos.	Class Pos.
2013	(United States) SRT Motorsports	53	SRT Viper GTS-R	(United Kingdom) Ryan Dalziel (Germany) Dominik Farnbacher (Belgium) Marc Goossens	LMGTE Pro	306	24th	8th
2013	(United States) SRT Motorsports	93	SRT Viper GTS-R	(United States) Jonathan Bomarito (United States) Tommy Kendall (Canada) Kuno Wittmer	LMGTE Pro	301	31st	9th
2015	(United States) Riley Motorsports-TI Auto	53	SRT Viper GTS-R	(Netherlands) Jeroen Bleekemolen (United States) Ben Keating (United States) Marc Miller	LMGTE Am	304	DNF	DNF
2017	(United States) Keating Motorsports	43	Riley Mk.30	(Netherlands) Jeroen Bleekemolen (United States) Ben Keating (United States) Ricky Taylor	LMP2	312	47th	20th
2019	(United States) Keating Motorsports	85	Ford GT	(Netherlands) Jeroen Bleekemolen (Brazil) Felipe Fraga (United States) Ben Keating	LMGTE Am	334	DSQ	DSQ
2022	(United States) Riley Motorsports	74	Ferrari 488 GTE Evo	(United Kingdom) Sam Bird (Brazil) Felipe Fraga (New Zealand) Shane van Gisbergen	LMGTE Pro	347	32nd	5th
