= Multimatic Motorsports =

Canadian Racing Team

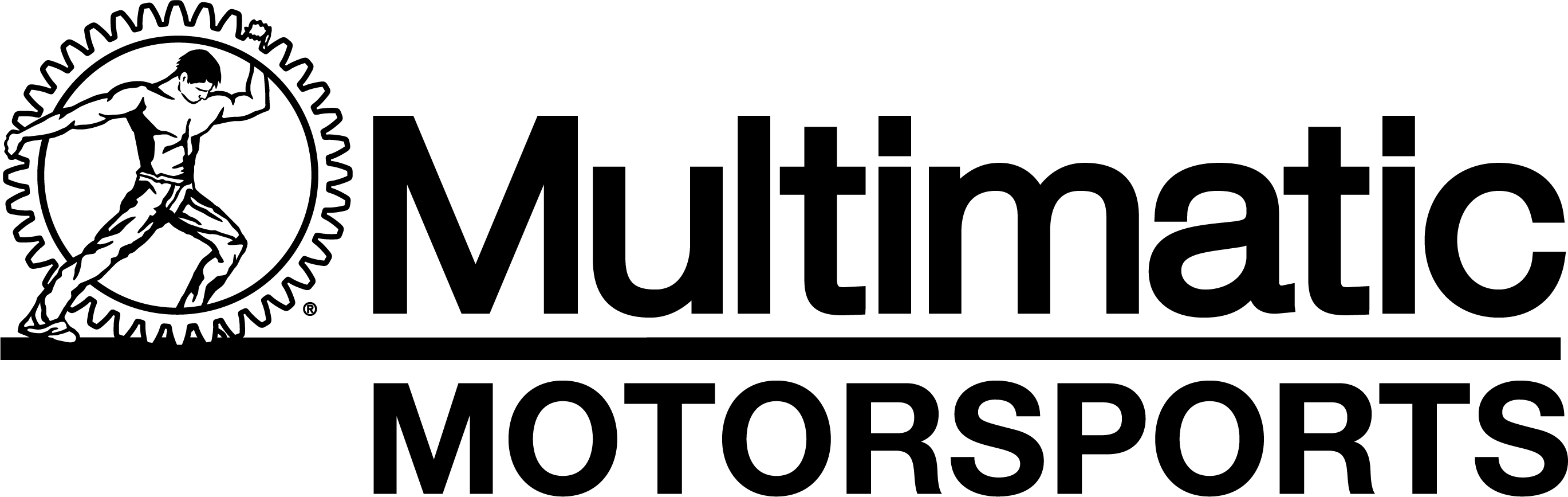
- Company type: Private
- Industry: Motorsport
- Founded: 1992
- Headquarters: Markham, Ontario; Canada
- Key people: Larry Holt, Team Principal; Sean Mason, Team Manager
- Website: http://www.multimaticmotorsports.com

Multimatic Motorsports is the competition arm of Multimatic's Special Vehicle Operations division. Founded in 1992, the team has competed in numerous sports car racing series, including the Michelin Pilot Challenge, IMSA SportsCar Championship, and FIA World Endurance Championship, as well as starts in the 24 Hours of Le Mans, most notably winning in 2016 with Ford Chip Ganassi Racing in the Ford GT LM GTE.

In late 2015, the organization set up Multimatic Motorsports Europe in Greatworth Park, United Kingdom, as a stand-alone base for its FIA World Endurance Championship LMGTE Pro effort, campaigning Ford GTs on behalf of Ford Chip Ganassi Racing.

== Car development ==
Having developed the Ford Mustang GT4 with support from its parent division Multimatic Engineering, Multimatic Motorsports currently constructs, sells and provides support for the globally homologated Mustang GT4 for Ford Performance from Multimatic Technical Centre in Markham, Ontario.

In 2017, the LMP2 prototype class saw a new set regulations, and Multimatic, in a joint venture with Riley Technologies, was selected as one of the four chassis manufacturers. Riley and Multimatic unveiled the Riley-Multimatic MkXXX as their car for the new set of LMP2 regulations. Together, they would work on the car's bodywork and aero, and Multimatic would be responsible for the development of the chassis as well as its design, whereas Riley were in charge of the car's mechanical components. The Mazda RT24-P was also born out of the project to compete in the new DPi regulations that were unveiled in the same year.

Their chassis was evolved for 2023, as Multimatic was selected as one of the four chassis suppliers for the new LMDh ruleset, one of two categories that would replace the outgoing LMP1 regulations, as well as DPi in North America. Currently, Porsche is supplied the chassis by Multimatic, which has seen considerable success thanks to Porsche's 963, having accumulated multiple wins and a championship since the car's debut at the 2023 24 Hours of Daytona. Audi was also set to compete with a Multimatic chassis, but this was stopped after Audi scrapped their LMDh project only weeks away from completing internal testing in favor of committing to their Formula One efforts.

Multimatic Motorsports has signed a number of different professional drivers over the years across a range of disciplines, including sports car racing, stock car racing, and rallying. As of 2025, they have twelve drivers, consisting of drivers such as Harry Tincknell, Mike Rockenfeller, and Christopher Mies.

== Racing results ==
1992 – Won the Sports Class of the Canadian Firestone Firehawk Championship in the team's first year of competition. Scott Maxwell joined the team as primary driver of a factory supported Ford Taurus SHO. Maxwell won the Driver's Championship by a 600-point margin.

1993 – Won the Sports Class of the Canadian Endurance Road Racing Championship. Scott Maxwell won a second straight National Driver's Championship.

1995 – Engineered, developed and built an IMSA GTS class Mustang tube frame car which finished on the podium in its first outing at Lime Rock Park. Also won the four-door sedan class of the Car & Driver One Lap of America with a Ford Aluminum Intensive Vehicle (AIV).

1999 – Won Ford its first ever Manufacturer's Championship in showroom stock racing while campaigning three Ford Mustang Cobras in the Motorola Cup North American Street Stock Championship.

2000 – Entered the 2000 24 Hours of Le Mans with a Lola B2K/40 using a Multimatic designed and built chassis. Multimatic Motorsports and drivers Scott Maxwell, David Empringham and Greg Wilkins won the LMP675 class. This is the only time a Canadian motorsports organization has won at the French endurance classic.

2002 – Won the Grand Am Cup Championship campaigning two Porsche GT3 Cup cars on behalf of Doncaster Racing. Scott Maxwell won the Driver's Championship.

2003 – Inaugural Daytona Prototype class winner at the 24 Hours of Daytona with the Ford Focus Daytona Prototype race car – designed, engineered and built by Multimatic.

2005 – Won the Grand Am Cup Championship campaigning the Multimatic designed, built and developed Ford Mustang FR500C. Multimatic driver David Empringham won the Driver's Championship.

2006 – GT2 class winner at the 2006 12 Hours of Sebring competing as Multimatic Motorsports Team Panoz with a Panoz Esperante GTLM.

2008 – Won the KONI Sports Car Challenge GS title campaigning two Ford Mustang FR500C cars on behalf of Hyper Sport Racing. Scott Maxwell won the Driver's Championship with Joe Foster.

2010 – Tasked by Ford Racing to engineer and build the new Mustang Boss 302R race car. Campaigned a two-car entry in the Grand-Am Continental Tire Sports Car Challenge GS class for drivers Scott Maxwell, Joe Foster, Frank Montecalvo and Gunnar Jeannette. The duo of Maxwell and Foster posted three poles during the season (Barber, VIR and Trois-Rivieres), but race results were hampered by reliability issues with the new car.

2011 – Multimatic Motorsports returned to the Grand-Am Continental Tire Sports Car Challenge with the #15 Mustang Boss 302R race car. Off season development by the team and Ford Racing made the car competitive in the GS class – Foster and Maxwell won at Barber and finished second at Daytona.

2012 – Multimatic Motorsports celebrated its 20th anniversary by launching the largest racing program in its history; campaigning four cars in the Grand-Am Continental Tire Sports Car Challenge. Multimatic Motorsports became an official partner to Aston Martin Racing, and debuted the Aston Martin Vantage V8 Grand-Am race car in the GS class. Notably Scott Maxwell and Joe Foster finished second at Barber Motorsports Park and third at Lime Rock Park. Tonis Kasemets and Jade Buford earned a third at Mazda Raceway Laguna Seca. All told, the Aston Martins earned five top ten finishes during the year.

Also during 2012, Multimatic Motorsports debuted the turn-key Ford Racing Focus ST-R in the ST class, which is a racing version of the Ford Focus ST road car. The ST-R was under development during the year, and secured a respectable 5 top ten positions.

2013 – Multimatic Motorsports continued its Grand-Am Continental Tire Sports Car Challenge with three Aston Martin Vantage V8 Grand-Am race cars. The cars competed in the GS class.

2014 – Multimatic Motorsports reverted to its previously campaigned Ford Mustang Boss 302Rs for the Continental Tire Sports Car Challenge. The two cars (No. 15 for Scott Maxwell and Jade Buford, and No. 158 for Billy Johnson and Ian James) competed in the GS class in the colors of team partners Miller Racing. Maxwell and Buford finished the season tied 4th in points.

2015 – Multimatic Motorsports continued with Ford Mustang Boss 302Rs for the first three rounds of the Continental Tire Sports Car Challenge before debuting the new Ford Performance Shelby GT350 R-C at Lime Rock Park. The car exhibited competitive pace almost immediately, scoring three wins in its debut season.

2016 – Multimatic Motorsports won the 2016 Continental Tire SportsCar Challenge team championship with the Ford Performance Shelby GT350R-C. Multimatic drivers Billy Johnson and Scott Maxwell also won the drivers championship. Multimatic also set up a UK motorsport base, Multimatic Motorsports Europe, to operate Ford Chip Ganassi Racing's FIA WEC LMGTE Pro effort. The operation netted its first win with a 1–2 finish in round 7 at Fuji Speedway in Japan.

2017 – Multimatic Motorsports did not contest the 2017 IMSA Continental Tire SportsCar Challenge. Instead, the company focused on homologating and constructing the new-for-2017 Mustang GT4 for use by customer teams in worldwide GT4 competition. Multimatic Motorsports Europe continued to field a two-car Ford GT team under the Ford Chip Ganassi Racing banner in FIA World Endurance Championship (WEC) competition, delivering two wins and a 2nd-place finish at Le Mans.

2018 – Multimatic Motorsports continued to supply Mustang GT4 cars to teams competing globally in the GT4-class while Multimatic Motorsports Europe again fielded a two-car Ford GT team under the Ford Chip Ganassi Racing banner in FIA World Endurance Championship (WEC) competition.

2019 – Multimatic Motorsports made a double car entry in the GT4 class for the 2019 British GT Championship with Canadian driver Scott Maxwell and Sebastian Priaulx, son of 3-time WTCC Andy. The second car was to be driven by the American duo of former NASCAR driver Chad McCumbee and Jade Buford. Maxwell and Priaulx started the first two races by claiming both pole positions and the win in race 2 while McCumbee and Buford finished 4th and 8th respectively. The team later had Harrison Newey, son of Formula One engineer Adrian Newey, Olympic cyclist champion Chris Hoy, Jack Roush Jr., son of NASCAR team owner and hall of frame inductee Jack Roush and 3-time World Touring Car champion Andy Priaulx.

Maxwell and Priaulx were in contention for the GT4 title, going into the final round at Donington Park, against TF Sport's Tom Canning and Ashley Hand. The sister car of Ashley Davies and Marco Signoretti retired after a collision on the formation lap. The number 15 car managed to get into 2nd place in GT4 but it wasn't enough to seal the title and they finished 2nd 8.5 points behind. Throughout the season, Chris Hoy, Billy Johnson, Chad McCumbee, Jade Buford, Richard Meaden and Jack Roush Jr. all scored points for the team but Multimatic Motorsports only just clinched 3rd in the teams' standings tied on points with HHC Motorsport.

== Racecar chassis ==
Not the team Multimatic Motorsports, but the constructor Multimatic, supplied race car chassis:

| Year | Car | Category |
|---|---|---|
| 2003 | Multimatic MDP1 | DP |
| 2017 | Mazda RT24-P | DPi |
| 2017 | Riley-Multimatic MkXXX | LMP2 |
| 2023 | Porsche 963 | LMDh |

=== WeatherTech SportsCar Championship wins ===
| # | Season | Date | Classes | Track / Race | No. | Winning drivers | Chassis | Engine |
|---|---|---|---|---|---|---|---|---|
| 1 | 2020 | July 4 | (DPi) | Daytona | 55 | (United States) Jonathan Bomarito / (United Kingdom) Harry Tincknell | Mazda RT24-P | Mazda MZ-2.0T 2.0 L Turbo I4 |
| 2 | 2020 | November 14 | (DPi) | Sebring | 55 | (United States) Jonathan Bomarito / (United States) Ryan Hunter-Reay / (United Kingdom) Harry Tincknell | Mazda RT24-P | Mazda MZ-2.0T 2.0 L Turbo I4 |
| 3 | 2021 | June 27 | (DPi) | Watkins Glen | 55 | (United States) Jonathan Bomarito / (United Kingdom) Oliver Jarvis / (United Kingdom) Harry Tincknell | Mazda RT24-P | Mazda MZ-2.0T 2.0 L Turbo I4 |
| 4 | 2021 | November 13 | (DPi) | Road Atlanta | 55 | (United States) Jonathan Bomarito / (United Kingdom) Oliver Jarvis / (United Kingdom) Harry Tincknell | Mazda RT24-P | Mazda MZ-2.0T 2.0 L Turbo I4 |
| 5 | 2023 | April 15 | (LMDh) | Long Beach | 6 | (France) Mathieu Jaminet / (United Kingdom) Nick Tandy | Porsche 963 | Porsche 9RD 4.6 L Twin Turbo V8 |
| 6 | 2023 | August 6 | (LMDh) | Road America | 7 | (Australia) Matt Campbell / (Brazil) Felipe Nasr | Porsche 963 | Porsche 9RD 4.6 L Twin Turbo V8 |
| 7 | 2023 | September 17 | (LMDh) | Indianapolis | 6 | (France) Mathieu Jaminet / (United Kingdom) Nick Tandy | Porsche 963 | Porsche 9RD 4.6 L Twin Turbo V8 |
| 8 | 2024 | January 27–28 | (LMDh) | Daytona | 7 | (United States) Dane Cameron / (Australia) Matt Campbell / (Brazil) Felipe Nasr / (United States) Josef Newgarden | Porsche 963 | Porsche 9RD 4.6 L Twin Turbo V8 |
| 9 | 2024 | May 12 | (LMDh) | Laguna Seca | 6 | (France) Mathieu Jaminet / (United Kingdom) Nick Tandy | Porsche 963 | Porsche 9RD 4.6 L Twin Turbo V8 |
| 10 | 2024 | June 23 | (LMDh) | Watkins Glen | 7 | (United States) Dane Cameron / (Brazil) Felipe Nasr | Porsche 963 | Porsche 9RD 4.6 L Twin Turbo V8 |
| 11 | 2024 | August 4 | (LMDh) | Road America | 6 | (France) Mathieu Jaminet / (United Kingdom) Nick Tandy | Porsche 963 | Porsche 9RD 4.6 L Twin Turbo V8 |
