= Scott Maxwell =

Canadian sports car racing driver

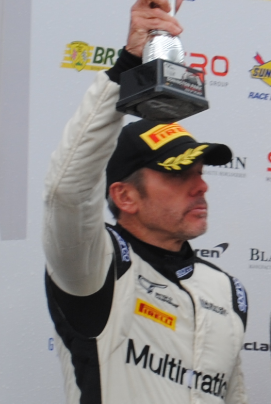
- Maxwell on the podium at Donington Park
- Nationality: (Canada) Canadian
- Born: January 20, 1964 (age 62) Toronto, Ontario, Canada
- Categorisation: FIA Silver (until 2019); FIA Bronze (2020–)

24 Hours of Le Mans career
- Years: 2000–2001, 2003, 2005–2006
- Teams: Multimatic Motorsports; Team Ascari; Team Panoz
- Best finish: 25th
- Class wins: 1

Scott Maxwell (born January 20, 1964) is a Canadian auto racing driver.

Maxwell has competed and won titles in Formula Vee (1984), Formula Ford 1600 (1985 and 1986), Canadian National Showroom Stock (1992 and 1993) and Grand-Am/Continental Tire SportsCar Challenge GS (2002 and 2008, 2016). He also contested the Canadian GM Challenge, Porsche Carrera Cup and Pro Formula Ford 2000 series from 1986 through 1990. He made a single Indy Lights start in 1992.

One of the highlights of Maxwell's career came in 2000 at the 24 Hours of Le Mans when he won the LMP 675 class for Multimatic Motorsports aboard a Nissan-powered Lola with fellow Canadians John Graham and Greg Wilkins.

In 2003, Maxwelll along with David Empringham and David Brabham, won the first ever Daytona Prototype race at the Rolex 24 Hours of Daytona. However, The Racer's Group GT-class Porsche 911 won overall honors in that race. He also contested the American Le Mans Series with Panoz in 2003 and Krohn-Barbour Racing (Lamborghini) in 2004 as well as contesting several Rolex Sports Car Series events for Multimatic Daytona Prototype customers. 2003 was to also see Maxwell attempting make his NASCAR Winston Cup Series debut, but he failed to qualify the No. 43 car for Petty Enterprises at Watkins Glen International.

Maxwell co-drove with Grand Am Cup Champion David Empringham in 2005 aboard a Multimatic Motorsports entered factory Ford Mustang FR500C. Maxwell missed out on sharing the title because he skipped one race to compete at Le Mans for Panoz Motor Sports.

In 2006, Maxwell clinched another milestone victory for Multimatic Motorsports when he teamed with David Brabham and Sébastien Bourdais to win the GT2 class at the 2006 12 Hours of Sebring. In 2008, Maxwell won the Grand American Road Racing KONI Sports Car Challenge driver's championship with partner Joe Foster aboard the Hypersports Mustang FR500C run in cooperation with Multimatic Motorsports. Maxwell clinched the 2016 Continental Tire SportsCar Challenge GS championship co-driving with Billy Johnson in the Ford Performance Shelby GT350R-C.

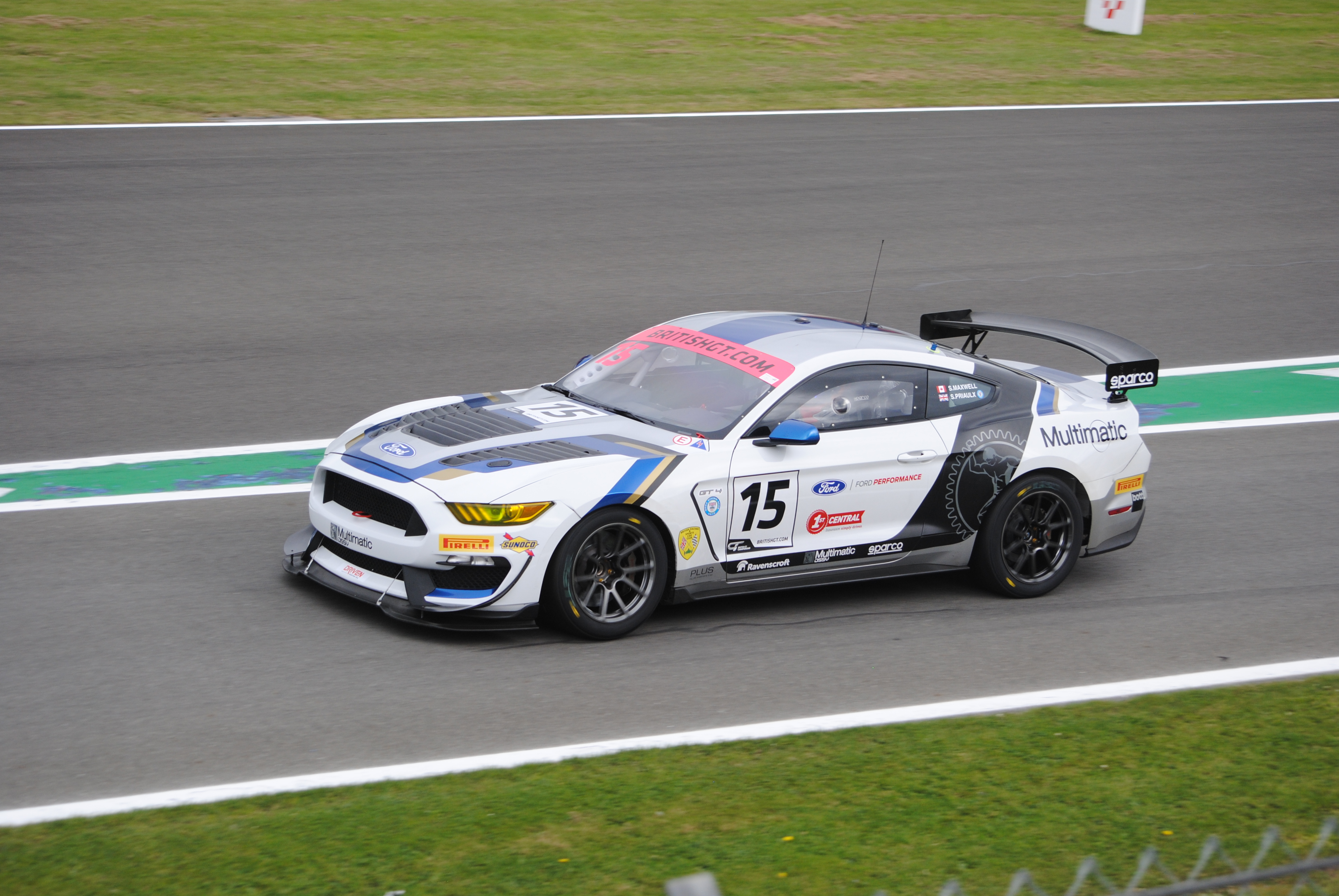
Maxwell and Priaulx's Multimatic Motorsports Ford Mustang at Donington Park

Maxwell drove for Multimatic Motorsports with Sebastian Priaulx in a Ford Mustang in the GT4 class in the 2019 British GT Championship. They were in contention for the class title but missed out by just 8.5 points from Tom Canning and Ash Hand, despite finishing ahead of their rivals in the finale.

== Motorsports career results ==
=== NASCAR ===
(key) (Bold - Pole position awarded by qualifying time. Italics - Pole position earned by points standings or practice time. * – Most laps led.)

==== Winston Cup Series ====
NASCAR Winston Cup Series results
Year	Team	No.	Make	1	2	3	4	5	6	7	8	9	10	11	12	13	14	15	16	17	18	19	20	21	22	23	24	25	26	27	28	29	30	31	32	33	34	35	36	NWCC	Pts	Ref
2003	Petty Enterprises	43	Dodge	DAY	CAR	LVS	ATL	DAR	BRI	TEX	TAL	MAR	CAL	RCH	CLT	DOV	POC	MCH	SON	DAY	CHI	NHA	POC	IND	GLN; DNQ	MCH	BRI	DAR	RCH	NHA	DOV	TAL	KAN	CLT	MAR	ATL	PHO	CAR	HOM	NA	0	

=== 24 Hours of Le Mans results ===
Year	Team	Co-Drivers	Car	Class	Laps	Pos.	Class Pos.
2000	(Canada) Multimatic Motorsports	(Canada) John Graham (Canada) Greg Wilkins	Lola B2K/40-Nissan	LMP675	274	25th	**1st**
2001	(United Kingdom) Team Ascari	(Netherlands) Klaas Zwart (France) Xavier Pompidou	Ascari A410-Judd	LMP900	66	DNF	DNF
2003	(United States) JML Team Panoz	(Switzerland) Benjamin Leuenberger (Belgium) David Saelens	Panoz LMP01 Evo-Élan	LMP900	233	DNF	DNF
2005	(United States) Panoz Motor Sports	(United States) Bill Auberlen (United Kingdom) Robin Liddell	Panoz Esperante GT-LM	GT2	27	DNF	DNF
2006	(Canada) Multimatic Motorsport Team Panoz	(United States) Gunnar Jeannette (United States) Tommy Milner	Panoz Esperante GT-LM	GT2	34	DNF	DNF

=== Complete British GT Championship results ===
(key) (Races in bold indicate pole position) (Races in italics indicate fastest lap)

Year	Team	Car	Class	1	2	3	4	5	6	7	8	9	DC	Points
2019	Multimatic Motorsports	Ford Mustang GT4	GT4	**OUL**; **1**; 29	**OUL**; **2**; 10	**SNE**; **1**; 24	SNE; 2; 18	SIL; 16	**DON**; 15	SPA; 19	BRH; 21	DON; 13	2nd	132.5
