= Grand-Am Road Racing =

North American auto racing series

- Sport: Sports car racing, Touring car racing
- Jurisdiction: United States; Canada
- Abbreviation: Grand-Am
- Founded: 2000
- Owner: NASCAR
- Headquarters: Daytona Beach, Florida
- President: Ed Bennett
- Closure date: 2013
- Fate: Merged with the American Le Mans Series

Grand-Am Road Racing or Grand-Am was an auto racing sanctioning body that was established in 1999 to organize road racing competitions in North America. Its primary focus was the Rolex Sports Car Series, an endurance racing championship series. It sanctioned five auto racing series. The series announced in September 2012 that it would be merging with the American Le Mans Series, which had been Grand-Am's main US competitor since its inception. The two series fully merged in 2014 under the banner of the TUDOR United SportsCar Championship, with the International Motor Sports Association.

== Overview ==
The Grand American Road Racing Association was established in 1999 and was located in Daytona Beach, Florida, near the homes of NASCAR, International Speedway Corporation (ISC), and Daytona International Speedway. Although originated by some members of the NASCAR community, Grand-Am centers on different styles of racing including sports car racing and touring car racing on road racing circuits throughout North America.

On September 4, 2008, NASCAR Holdings announced their buyout of the Grand American Road Racing Association in an attempt to merge communications, research, and marketing resources into a single entity, while allowing each organization to continue to control their own racing series.

On September 5, 2012, the series announced that they would be merging with the Braselton, Georgia-based American Le Mans Series. Both series stayed current in 2013 and began a combined series in 2014.

== Rolex Sports Car Series ==
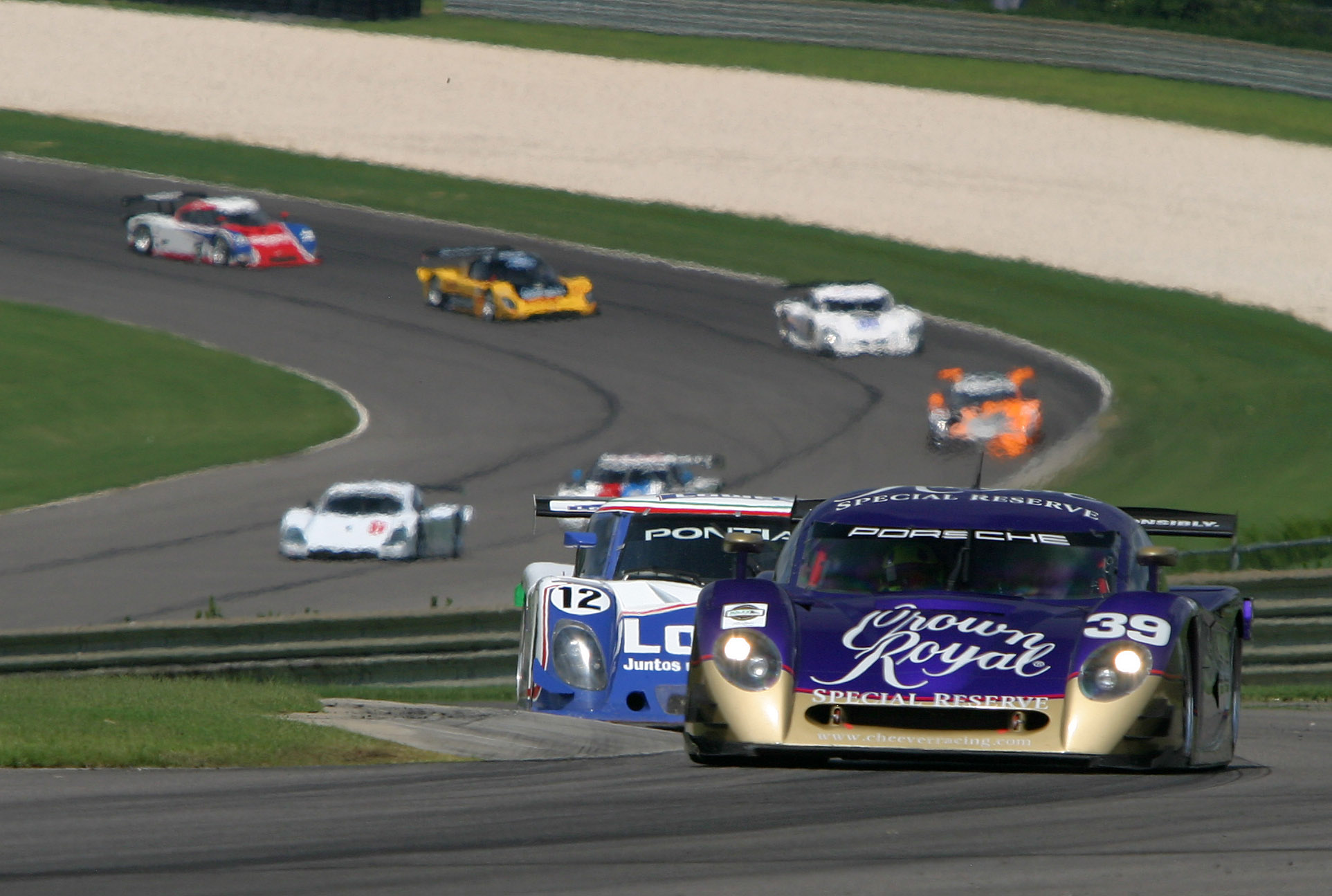
A field of Daytona Prototypes in Grand-Am's premier championship, the Rolex Sports Car Series

The premiere series of Grand-Am was the Rolex Sports Car Series which originated in 2000 as a successor to the defunct United States Road Racing Championship. Combining classes of Sports Racing Prototypes and Grand Touring-style production-based cars, the series was centered on the Rolex 24 At Daytona but included a wide variety of American, Canadian, and Mexican tracks.

In 2003, the series replaced its Sports Racing Prototypes with new Daytona Prototypes, a custom-built class built specifically for the Rolex Series. These cost-effective race cars offer a relatively economical racing environment in which technology is carefully controlled to ensure close racing and approximate parity between different chassis and engines. For the 2012 season, the Rolex series rolled out Gen-III prototypes with new bodies, engines and chassis. These new chassis were designed to keep costs low while also creating body shapes with more brand characteristics. The new chassis were headlined by Corvette and new Ford prototypes.

The GT classes were also simplified over the years, allowing for a variety of American, European, and Japanese manufacturers to participate including Audi, Chevrolet, Ferrari, BMW, Porsche, Ford and Mazda. Rules allowed tuned production cars or custom tube frame chassis to be used, letting participants save cost if necessary.

In 2013 the GX class were introduced running with alternative fuel and new technology that was not already in use in GT cars. The contending manufacturers were Mazda, Porsche, and Lotus.

Daytona Prototypes and GTs usually shared the track although do occasionally race separately, typically at shorter circuits.

=== Continental Tire Sports Car Challenge Series ===
Originally based on a Canadian series before being acquired by Grand-Am, the Continental Tire Sports Car Challenge (originally known as Grand-Am Cup) is a production-based touring car series. The series is split into two classes known as Grand Sport (GS), intended for large capacity GT-style cars, and Street Tuner (ST), consisting of smaller sedans and coupes, some of which are front-wheel drive. The Continental Tire Sports Car Challenge until 2013 supported some Rolex Series races but also headlined some of its own dates. This series continues with the TUDOR United SportsCar Championship The series is somewhat comparable to the old Trans Am Series.

=== Ferrari Challenge ===
Grand-Am was the sanctioning body behind the North American arm of the international Ferrari Challenge series. Using identical race-tuned Ferraris, the series originally ran the F355 then switched to the 360 Modenas before switching to new F430s in 2006 and the 458 Italia in 2010.

=== Shell Historic Challenge ===
Tied together with the Ferrari Challenge series, the Shell Historic Challenge is a series consisting of older Ferrari, Maserati, and Scuderia Ferrari-run Alfa Romeo models. Although a racing series, the competition is more of an exhibition of the classic machinery than a true race.

=== Grand-Am iRacing.com Online Sports Car Series ===
Grand-Am also sanctioned an online racing series through the racing simulator iRacing.com. This series raced digital versions of a Riley Daytona Prototype and the McLaren MP4-12C, mirroring the Rolex series.

== Series defunct before the merger ==
=== Formula Renault 2000 ===
Grand-Am initially sanctioned the North American arm of the Formula Renault series under the 2.0 Litre formula. However the series was later reorganized and came under the control of the National Auto Sport Association (NASA) where it currently runs under the Formula TR name.

=== Ford Racing Mustang Challenge ===
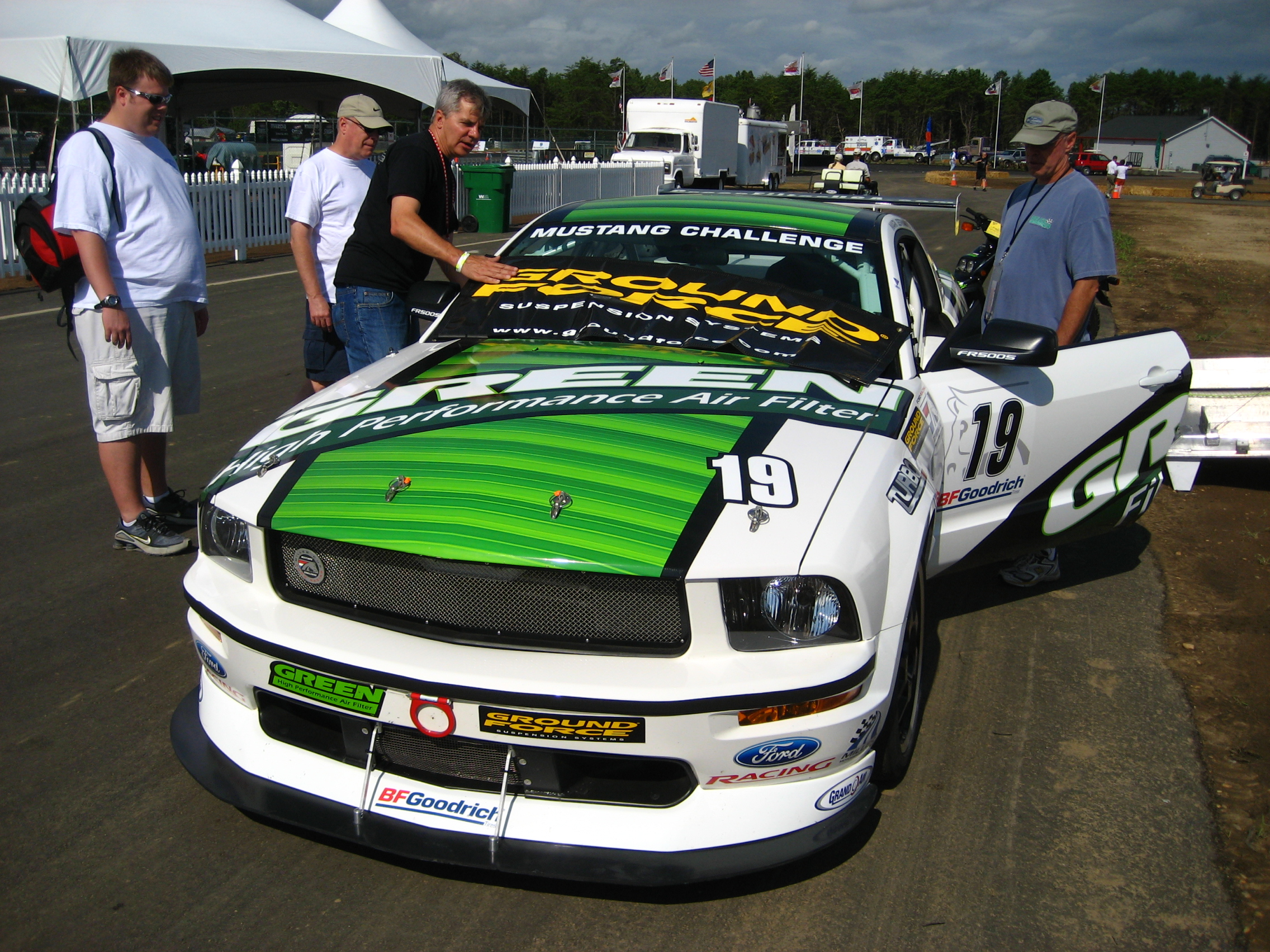
A Ford Mustang FR500S which competes in the Mustang Challenge

The Ford Racing Mustang Challenge for the Miller Cup was a series which started in 2008. A one-make series similar to the Ferrari Challenge, this series used identical Ford Mustang FR500S cars co-developed by Ford Racing and Larry H. Miller, owner of Miller Motorsports Park. The series featured amateur drivers in 45 minute sprint events.

The series held its final event September 12, 2010 at Miller Motorsports Park. In the announcement, the series predicted that the FR500S Mustang "will continue to be eligible for competition in a variety of series." The FR500S chassis are now eligible for competition in the GTS class of the SCCA Pro Racing World Challenge, with several modifications to bring their level of performance equal with the other cars in the class. Six Mustang Challenge competitors entered their first event as GTS cars at the Mid Ohio race August 7 and August 8, 2010.

=== SunTrust Moto-ST Series ===
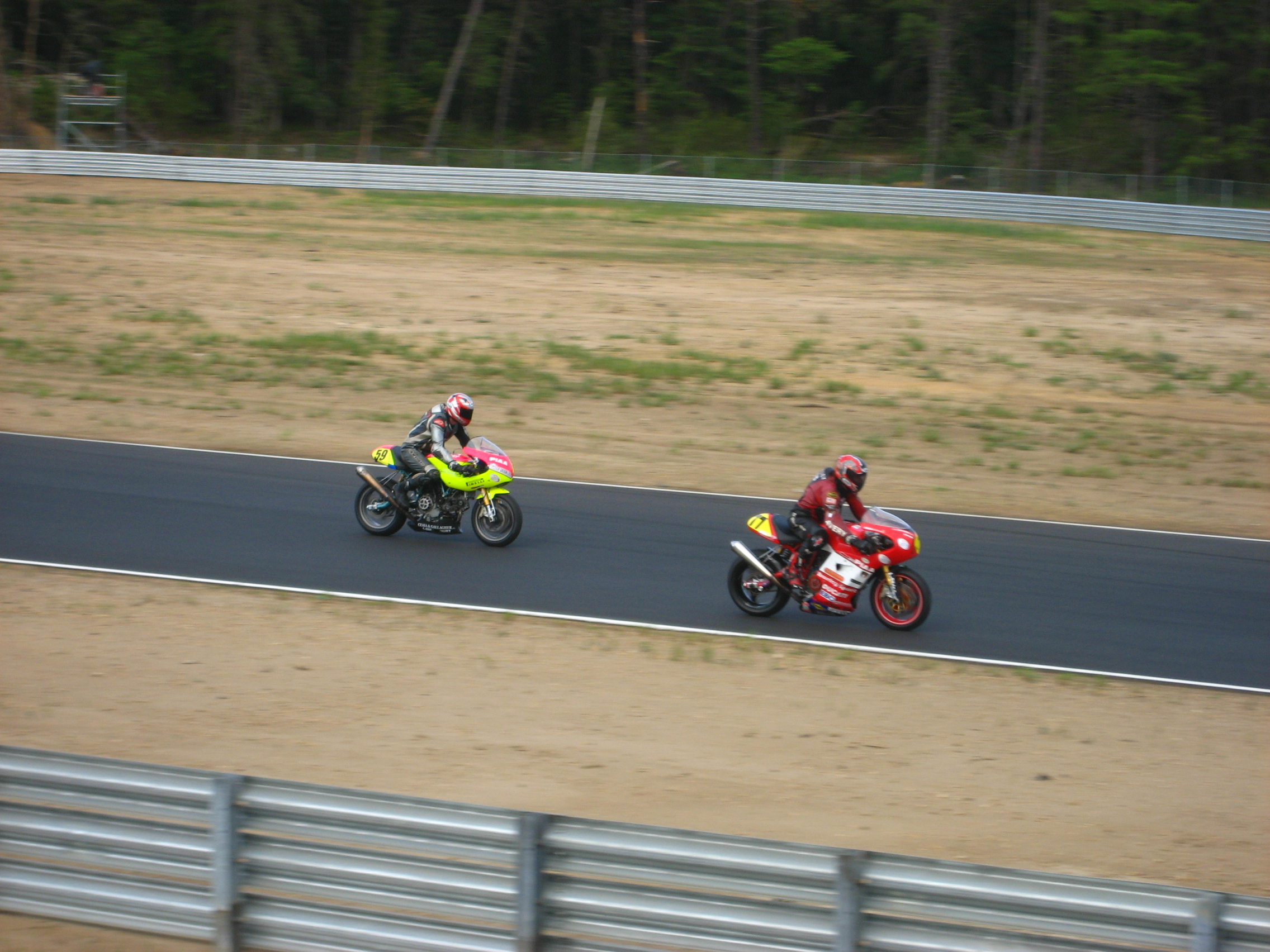
Two classes of bikes used in the SunTrust Moto-ST Series

The only motorcycle series run by Grand-Am, the SunTrust Moto-ST Series was an endurance racing series launched in 2007 for production-based motorcycles. Races ranged from three hours to eight hours. Motorcycles were four-stroke, two cylinder models and broken into classes depending on power and weight. Teams of riders were used to run an endurance event. From 2009 the series was sanctioned by the American Motorcyclist Association.
