= Multimatic =

Canadian automotive component manufacturer

Multimatic Inc.
- Type: Private company
- Industry: Automotive manufacturing and engineering
- Founded: 1984
- Headquarters: Markham, Ontario; Canada
- Divisions: Multimatic Motorsports
- Website: www.multimatic.com

Multimatic Inc. is a privately held Canadian corporation that supplies components, systems, and engineering services to the global automotive industry. Headquartered in Markham, Ontario, Multimatic has manufacturing divisions and engineering facilities in North America, Europe and Asia. Multimatic was ranked 93 on the Automotive News 2019 Top 100 Global OEM Parts Suppliers list and 56 in their list of the largest suppliers to North America, ranked by sales of original equipment parts in 2018.

Multimatic engineered and constructed the carbon chassis and suspension systems for the RUF CTR3, and Aston Martin One-77, and was Ford's build partner for the third-generation Ford GT. Multimatic also manufactures the lightweight carbon-fibre Monocoque for the Aston Martin Valkyrie. The company has also provided input on the Aston Martin V12 Zagato, Aston Martin CC100, and Aston Martin Vulcan models.

== Organization ==
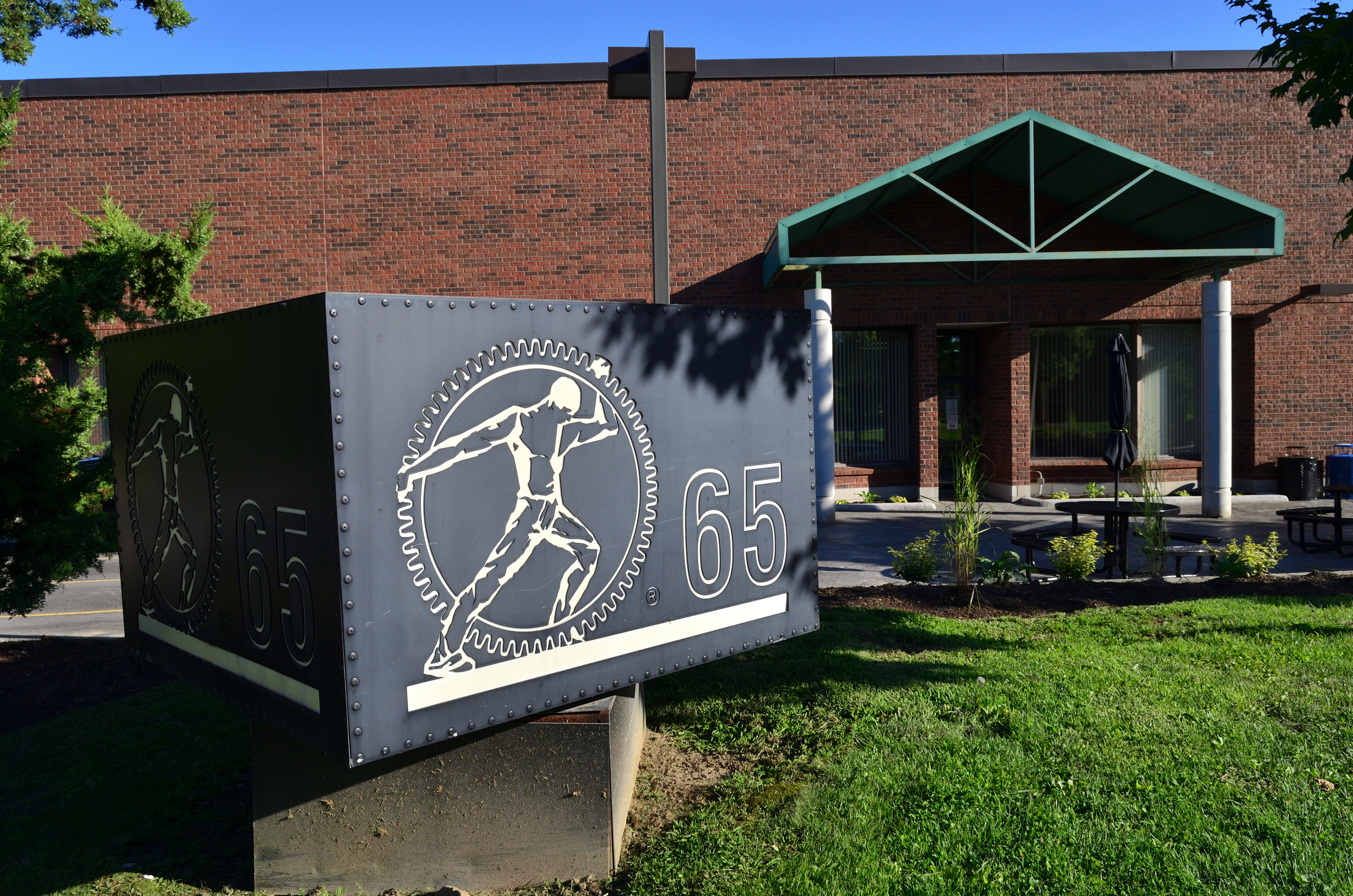
Multimatic Technical Centre in Markham, Ontario.

Multimatic Inc. is organized into five operating groups that make up the structure of the corporation.

- Multimatic Engineering supports the manufacturing duties within the company.
- Multimatic Mechanisms produces systems including aerodynamics, complex mechanisms, and hinges.
- Multimatic Niche Vehicles is responsible for the production of low volume sports cars. Cars such as the second-generation Ford GT have come from this division.
- Multimatic Special Vehicle Operations assists in the assembly and engineering of full-scale vehicles. This division also supports Multimatic Niche Vehicles and the company's motorsport arm, Multimatic Motorsports.
- Multimatic Structures & Suspension produces automotive structural components and vehicle dynamics.

== In racing ==
Multimatic also has a motorsport arm, Multimatic Motorsports, where they help engineer and develop for different racing teams and manufacturers. Currently, they provide engineering assistance to Aston Martin for their Valkyrie AMR-LMH project, and development assistance for both Ford with their Ford Mustang GT3 and Ford Mustang GT4 sports cars. In the past, Multimatic also assisted Ford with the development of the Ford GT LM GTE. Multimatic have also manufactured a sports car of their own with the Multimatic MDP1, a Daytona Prototype that they won in class with at the 2003 24 Hours of Daytona.

In 2017, the LMP2 prototype class saw a new set of regulations, and Multimatic, in a joint venture with Riley Technologies, was selected as one of four chassis manufacturers. Riley and Multimatic unveiled the Riley-Multimatic MkXXX as their car for the new set of LMP2 regulations. The Mazda RT24-P was also born out of the project to compete in the new DPi regulations that were unveiled in the same year.

Their chassis was evolved for 2023, as Multimatic was selected as one of the four chassis suppliers for the new LMDh ruleset, one of two categories that would replace the outgoing LMP1 regulations, as well as DPi in North America. Multimatic's LMDh chassis has seen considerable success thanks to Porsche's 963, having accumulated multiple wins and a championship since the car's debut at the 2023 24 Hours of Daytona.
