= Mazda RT24-P =

Race car

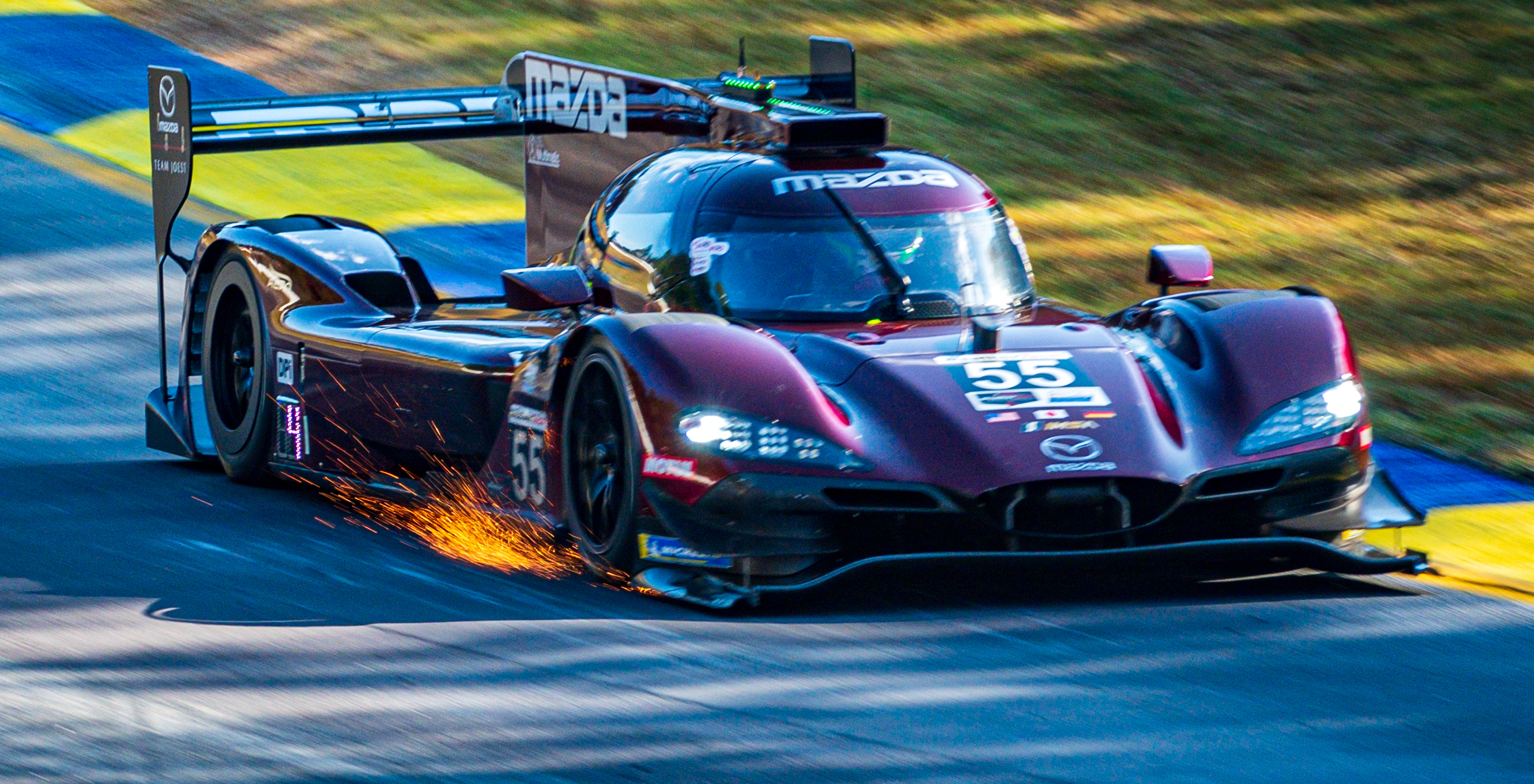
- The #55 RT24-P at the 2019 Petit Le Mans
- Category: Daytona Prototype International
- Constructor: Mazda (Riley/Multimatic)
- Designers: Mark Handford; Bob Riley; Bill Riley; Jacques Flynn
- Predecessor: Lola B12/80 Mazda

Technical specifications
- Chassis: Carbon fiber monocoque
- Suspension (front): Independent double-wishbone with Multimatic DSSV dampers
- Suspension (rear): Same as front
- Length: 4,750 mm (187 in)
- Width: 1,900 mm (75 in)
- Wheelbase: 3,022 mm (119.0 in)
- Engine: Mazda MZ-2.0T 2.0 L (122.0 cu in) DOHC 16-valve I4, turbocharged, mid-mounted
- Weight: 2,050 lb (930 kg) including driver
- Fuel: VP Racing Fuels MS100 RON unleaded 80% + E20 American Ethanol 20%
- Lubricants: Total
- Brakes: Brembo Calliper, Hitco Carbon Disc and Pads
- Tyres: Continental, Michelin

Competition history
- Notable entrants: (United States) SpeedSource (Germany) Joest Racing (Canada) Multimatic Motorsports
- Notable drivers: (United Kingdom) Oliver Jarvis (United States) Tristan Nunez (United States) Jonathan Bomarito (Germany) Rene Rast (United States) Spencer Pigot (Germany) Timo Bernhard (France) Oliver Pla (United Kingdom) Harry Tincknell (United States) Ryan Hunter-Reay (United States) Tom Long (United States) Joel Miller (Canada) James Hinchcliffe (United Kingdom) Marino Franchitti (Brazil) Lucas di Grassi
- Debut: 2017 Rolex 24 at Daytona
- First win: 2019 6 Hours of The Glen
- Last win: 2021 Petit Le Mans
- Last event: 2021 Petit Le Mans
| Races | Wins | Podiums |
|---|---|---|
| 47 | 7 | 25 |
- Teams' Championships: 0
- Constructors' Championships: 0
- Drivers' Championships: 0

The Mazda RT24-P, also known as the Mazda Road to 24 – Prototype, is a Daytona Prototype International (DPi) racing car built to the 2017 IMSA DPi regulations. The car is designed and built by Mazda Motorsports in collaboration with Multimatic Motorsports, and is based on the Riley-Multimatic MkXXX LMP2 chassis.

The RT24-P was eligible for competition in the DPi class of the IMSA SportsCar Championship. It made its racing debut at the 2017 24 Hours of Daytona with the SpeedSource Race Engineering team running under the Mazda Motorsports banner.

== Development ==
=== Initial development ===
On the 16th of November 2016, Mazda unveiled the car at the 2016 LA Auto Show. Aerodynamic development of the car was done by Multimatic using computational fluid dynamics, with the car undergoing a number of bodywork changes compared to the MkXXX it was based on. Nearly the entire front section of the car underwent a redesign, with the most notable changes being made to the wheel pods, as well as revised positions for the brake ducts and mirrors. At the rear, the wheel pods were also redesigned with a sharp taper at the ends, resulting in the car's rear wing supports extending to the bottom.

Early on in testing, both cars initially featured a side-exit exhaust, although during Roar Before the 24 pre-season tests, one car was subsequently altered to run with a periscope exhaust to evaluate its effectiveness. Following the Roar, both cars were altered to run with periscope exhausts after the configuration was found to boost power. The RT24-P would receive a mid-season cooling update on the #70 car at the 6 Hours of Watkins Glen.

=== Post-2017 upgrades ===
It was later announced by Mazda in July 2017, following the round at the Canadian Tire Motorsport Park, that its 2017 program with Speedsource was to be terminated immediately in light of early preparation for the next season's campaign with Joest Racing. Joest Racing said it would be conducting testing and evaluation of the car in 2 stages (each held in North America and Europe respectively), with the team focusing on the initial car before shifting to a newer upgraded chassis. The European phase of testing began with a shakedown of the car at the Hockenheimring short course in Germany. It was subsequently revealed by Multimatic that the upgrades intended for the RT24-P, focusing on aero and mechanicals, were to cost a million dollars.

The initial shakedown of the heavily revised RT24-P took place at Donington Park in the United Kingdom. The American testing program then began on the 1st of November at Daytona. Additional testing was also subsequently carried out at Sebring. The new heavily upgraded car was then formally unveiled to the public at the 2017 LA Auto Show in a new livery.

Ahead of the 2019 season, the car once again underwent a series of upgrades aimed at improving engine reliability and power output.

== Racing history ==
=== 2017 IMSA WeatherTech Sportscar Championship ===
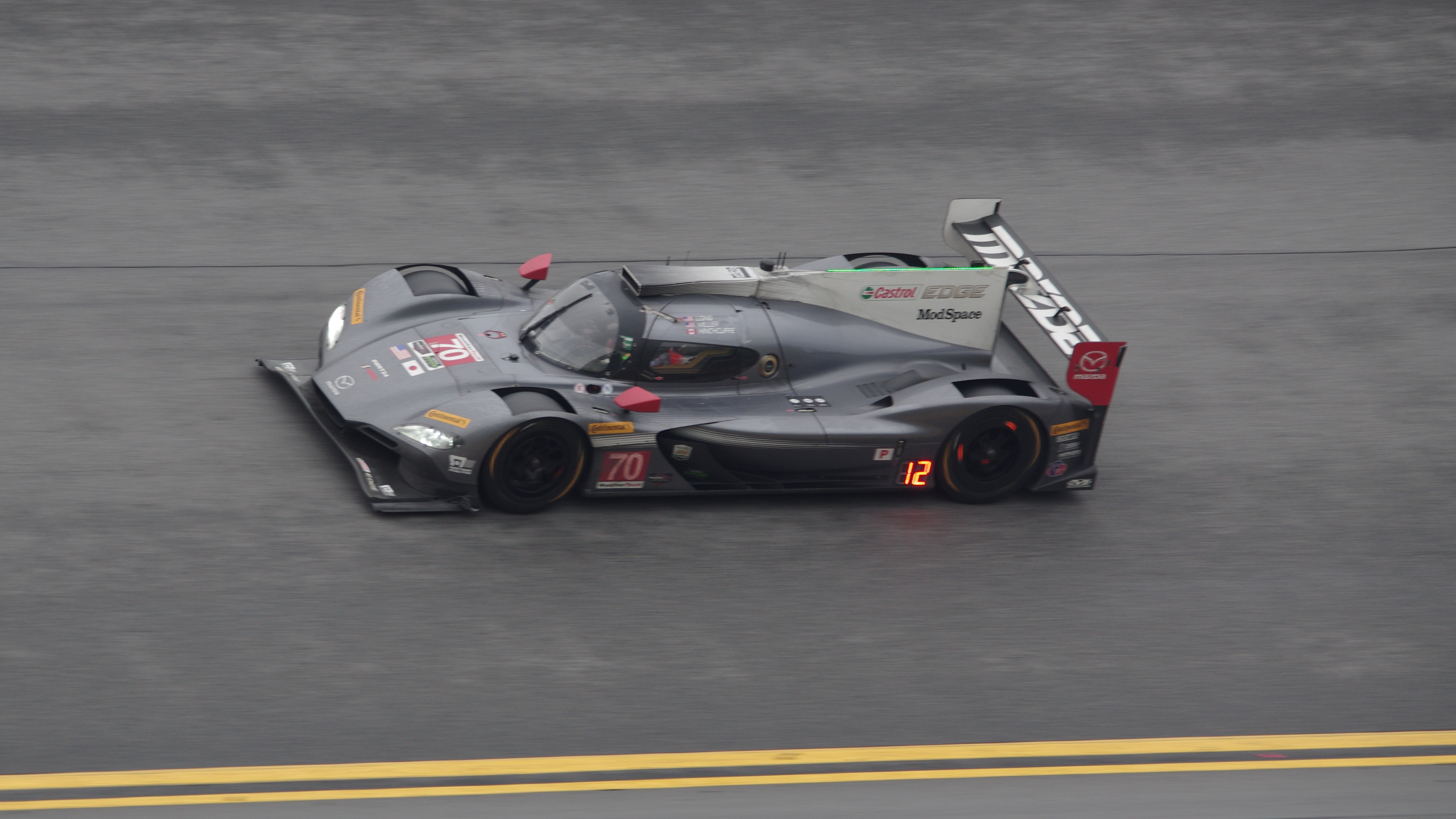
The #70 Mazda Motorsports Mazda RT24-P at the 2017 24 Hours of Daytona

At the season-opening 2017 24 Hours of Daytona, the 2 RT24-Ps struggled during qualifying, placing 9th and 10th and trailing the pole-sitting Cadillac DPi-V.R by 3 seconds, the #55 finishing ahead of the #70. The race itself would also prove challenging for Mazda; the crew of the #55 had clawed their way up to 5th place overall before the car became engulfed in flames in the pit lane due to an oil fire, forcing a retirement just 4 hours from the finish. The sister #70 was forced to pit on the second lap due to a piece of plastic lodged in the air intake, while later on, a penalty combined with a collision with the #10 Cadillac necessitated another unscheduled pit to repair the rear wing assembly, before the car became beset with clutch and transmission issues in the 6th hour of the race. It finished 197 laps down from the leader.

At the second race of the season, the 2017 12 Hours of Sebring, the #55 and #70 placed 8th and 10th during qualifying, with the #55 1.7 seconds behind pole in a much improved showing compared to Daytona. The #55 finished 5th in the Prototype class and 29th overall, 29 laps down on the leader, while the #70 was involved in an incident on the entry to the final corner and consequently lost time due to repairs, finishing 40th overall.

At the third race of the season, the 2017 BUBBA Burger Sports Car Grand Prix held at the Long Beach Circuit, the cars saw an upturn in pace, with the #55 car qualifying in 3rd, just 6 tenths off the pole-sitting #10 Wayne Taylor Racing Cadillac, while the sister #70 car qualified in 7th, 1.4 seconds behind pole. The race saw the #55 score the first podium for the RT24-P, with the pairing of Tristan Nunez and Jonathan Bomarito coming in 3rd (15 seconds behind the leader) due to a yellow flag, while the #70 finished a lap down, 21st overall and 7th in class.

At the fourth race of the season, the Advance Auto Parts Sportscar Showdown held at the Circuit of the Americas, the cars fell back pace-wise in qualifying, with the #55 ending the session 7th, 2.4 seconds slower than the pole sitter, and the #70 qualifying behind in 10th, 3.1 seconds away from pole. During the race, both cars would suffer from electrical issues, with the #55 retiring and the #70 finishing in 33rd overall.

For the fifth race of the season, the Chevrolet Detroit Grand Prix held at the Detroit Street Circuit, it initially appeared that the #55 of Bomarito would start in 2nd place, having been beaten to pole by Renger van der Zande in the #90 VisitFlorida Racing Riley-Multimatic MkXXX during the qualifying session. However, this result was later nullified after Ricky Taylor set the fastest lap only to crash moments later, resulting in a session-ending red flag a mere 5 minutes after qualifying started. As a result, the starting order was determined by championship standings. During the race, the #70 would score the car's second podium (and the first for the #70 crew of Tom Long and Joel Miller), with the #70 finishing 34.502 seconds behind the race leader. In the sister #55 car, Nunez had originally looked set to come home 6th, but took advantage of a late-race spin by Stephen Simpson in the JDC-Miller Oreca to finish 5th.

At the sixth round of the season, the Sahlen's Six Hours of the Glen, the #55 and #70 qualified in 9th and 10th, 2.5 and 2.6 seconds adrift of the polesitting #2 Tequila Patrón ESM Ligier Nissan DPi respectively. During the race, after Bomarito successfully held off Olivier Pla in the #52 Ligier JS P217 of PR1/Mathiasen Motorsports, the #55 finished the race in 3rd, 7.363 seconds behind the winners, serving as the second consecutive podium for the RT24-P and the second podium of the season for the #55 team. However, the sister #70 car did not enjoy the same level of success, incurring a penalty at the start for changing tires on the grid and later being struck by a mechanical failure which hampered the turbocharger, leading to a loss of power and eventual retirement.

At the seventh round of the season, the Mobil 1 SportsCar Grand Prix held at the Canadian Tire Motorsport Park, the two cars had a mixed session, with the #55 coming in 5th, clocking in a 1:08.959 (just 5 tenths away from pole), while the #70 placed 10th, rounding out the Prototype class and finishing 1.5 seconds behind the pole-sitting #10 Cadillac. The two cars finished the race in 4th and 5th, the #55 leading the #70 home. The #55 was in the top 3 at one point, pitting during a heavy shower but eventually falling back as the track dried up following the downpour; this allowed the slick-shod runners to slice their way up their field while the #55 was forced into the pits for a change to slicks.

The Mobil 1 SportsCar Grand Prix would ultimately be the last time the car would be campaigned in the 2017 season, with Mazda announcing nine days later, on the 18th of July 2017, that it would dissolve its partnership with the SpeedSource Race Engineering team with immediate effect. This was to prepare for the 2018 season with Joest Racing, who would campaign the cars under the Mazda Team Joest banner. It was also announced that the team's full-season drivers would be involved in testing for the updated prototype with Joest. This would also mark the final race for the SpeedSource outfit, with the team closing its doors and putting up all its equipment for auction at the end of the year.

=== 2018 WeatherTech Sportscar Championship ===
At the season-opening 2018 24 Hours of Daytona, qualifying results were mixed; the #55 came 9th in the Prototype field, 5 tenths off the pole-sitting #10 Wayne Taylor Racing Cadillac DPi-V.R, while the #77 did not set a lap after the Joest Racing team observed an oddity in the telemetry. The race was no better for the team, with both cars encountering trouble early and being unable to recover (the #55 again retiring after a major fire, and the #77 suffering gearbox issues amongst other things). Both cars failed to finish, which left the team with a much-reduced mileage compared to their class rivals.

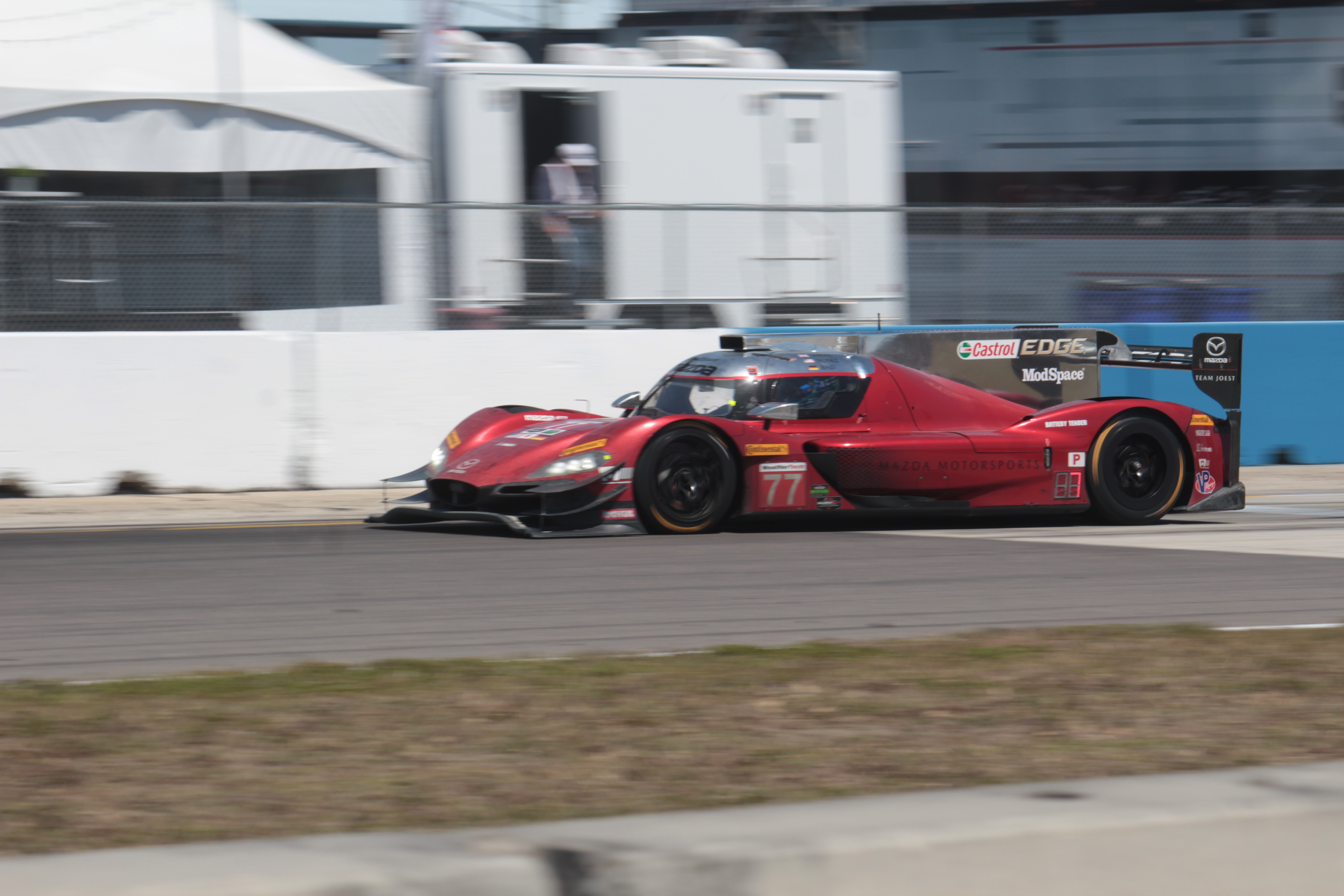
The No. 77 RT24-P at the 2018 12 Hours of Sebring

At the second race of the season, the 2018 12 Hours of Sebring, both cars fell back against the competition during the qualifying session, with the #77 coming in 7th, 8 tenths behind the leading #90 Cadillac of Spirit of Daytona Racing, while the #55 came in 9th, half a tenth behind the sister car. The first 3 hours of the race were smooth and uneventful, with both cars on the lead lap, running sixth and seventh (with the #55 leading the #77), and within 30 seconds of the leading car, the #31 Cadillac DPi-V.R. Owing to better fuel consumption than the competition, the cars were able to take the lead periodically, although it was by the fourth hour that issues surfaced. The #77 ran into issues with its rear brakes, with the time spent rectifying the issue costing it 24 minutes of track time, falling over 5 laps behind the leaders. The #55 surged ahead, taking third at the start of the sixth hour. By the 11th hour of the race, the #55 was now leading the race, although it was later forced to cede the lead to the #22 ESM Nissan DPi due to faulty headlamps, requiring an additional unscheduled pit stop. However, the crew of the #55 would see their effort come to naught at the final hour, as in the final pit stop, the #55 suffered from an engine ignition issue, losing 1 lap in the process and demoting the car to a 6th-place finish.

At the third round of the season, the BUBBA Burger Sports Car Grand Prix at Long Beach, the #55 came in third during qualifying; both cars finished the race 4th and 9th, the #77 leading the #55 home.

At the fourth round, held at the Mid-Ohio Sports Car Course, both the #55 and the #77 challenged throughout the first half of the race, but the #55 retired just after the halfway mark following suspension damage after contact with a GT car. The #77 finished third.

The fifth round of the season, held at the Detroit Street Circuit, saw both cars fail to reach the chequered flag after qualifying 8th and 9th, the #77 running out of fuel with four corners to go, and the #55 retiring after a driveshaft failure within the first five laps.

== Complete IMSA SportsCar Championship results ==
Results in bold indicate pole position. Results in italics indicate fastest lap.

| Year | Entrant | Class | Drivers | No. | 1 | 2 | 3 | 4 | 5 | 6 | 7 | 8 | 9 | 10 | 11 | Points | Pos |
|---|---|---|---|---|---|---|---|---|---|---|---|---|---|---|---|---|---|
| Year | Entrant | Class | Drivers | No. | **DAY** | **SEB** | **LBH** | **AUS** | **BEL** | **WGL** | **MOS** | **ELK** | **LGA** | **ATL** | | Points | Pos |
| **2017** | (United States) Mazda Motorsports | Daytona Prototype International | (United States) Jonathan Bomarito | 55 | 11 | 5 | 3 | 10 | 5 | 3 | 4 | | | | | **181** | **9th** |
| **2017** | (United States) Mazda Motorsports | Daytona Prototype International | (United States) Tristan Nunez | 55 | 11 | 5 | 3 | 10 | 5 | 3 | 4 | | | | | **181** | **9th** |
| **2017** | (United States) Mazda Motorsports | Daytona Prototype International | (United States) Spencer Pigot | 55 | 11 | 5 | | | | 3 | | | | | | **181** | **9th** |
| **2017** | (United States) Mazda Motorsports | Daytona Prototype International | (United States) Tom Long | 70 | 12 | 8 | 6 | 8 | 3 | 9 | 5 | | | | | **168** | **10th** |
| **2017** | (United States) Mazda Motorsports | Daytona Prototype International | (United States) Joel Miller | 70 | 12 | 8 | 6 | 8 | 3 | 9 | 5 | | | | | **168** | **10th** |
| **2017** | (United States) Mazda Motorsports | Daytona Prototype International | (Canada) James Hinchcliffe | 70 | 12 | | | | | | | | | | | **168** | **10th** |
| **2017** | (United States) Mazda Motorsports | Daytona Prototype International | (United Kingdom) Marino Franchitti | 70 | | 8 | | | | 9 | | | | | | **168** | **10th** |
| | | | | | **DAY** | **SEB** | **LBH** | **MOH** | **BEL** | **WGL** | **MOS** | **ELK** | **LGA** | **ATL** | | Points | Pos |
| **2018** | (Germany) Mazda Team Joest | Daytona Prototype International | (United States) Jonathan Bomarito | 55 | 16 | 6 | 9 | 14 | 14 | 10 | 11 | 8 | 4 | 3 | | **218** | **10th** |
| **2018** | (Germany) Mazda Team Joest | Daytona Prototype International | (United Kingdom) Harry Tincknell | 55 | 16 | 6 | 9 | | 14 | 10 | 11 | 8 | 4 | | | **218** | **10th** |
| **2018** | (Germany) Mazda Team Joest | Daytona Prototype International | (United States) Spencer Pigot | 55 | 16 | 6 | | 14 | | 10 | | | | 3 | | **218** | **10th** |
| **2018** | (Germany) Mazda Team Joest | Daytona Prototype International | (United Kingdom) Marino Franchitti | 55 | | | | | | | | | | 3 | | **218** | **10th** |
| **2018** | (Germany) Mazda Team Joest | Daytona Prototype International | (United Kingdom) Oliver Jarvis | 77 | 17 | 8 | 4 | 3 | 9 | 13 | 6 | 11 | 9 | 2 | | **234** | **8th** |
| **2018** | (Germany) Mazda Team Joest | Daytona Prototype International | (United States) Tristan Nunez | 77 | 17 | 8 | 4 | 3 | 9 | 13 | 6 | 11 | 9 | 2 | | **234** | **8th** |
| **2018** | (Germany) Mazda Team Joest | Daytona Prototype International | (Germany) René Rast | 77 | 17 | 8 | | | | 13 | | | | | | **234** | **8th** |
| **2018** | (Germany) Mazda Team Joest | Daytona Prototype International | (Brazil) Lucas di Grassi | 77 | | | | | | | | | | 2 | | **234** | **8th** |
| | | | | | **DAY** | **SEB** | **LBH** | **MOH** | **BEL** | **WGL** | **MOS** | **ELK** | **LGA** | **ATL** | | Points | Pos |
| **2019** | (Germany) Mazda Team Joest | Daytona Prototype International | (United States) Jonathan Bomarito | 55 | 9 | 6 | 8 | 3 | 11 | 1 | 2 | 1 | 10 | 11 | | **263** | **6th** |
| **2019** | (Germany) Mazda Team Joest | Daytona Prototype International | (United Kingdom) Harry Tincknell | 55 | 9 | 6 | 8 | | 11 | 1 | 2 | 1 | 10 | 11 | | **263** | **6th** |
| **2019** | (Germany) Mazda Team Joest | Daytona Prototype International | (France) Olivier Pla | 55 | 9 | 6 | | | | 1 | | | | 11 | | **263** | **6th** |
| **2019** | (Germany) Mazda Team Joest | Daytona Prototype International | (United States) Ryan Hunter-Reay | 55 | | | | 3 | | | | | | | | **263** | **6th** |
| **2019** | (Germany) Mazda Team Joest | Daytona Prototype International | (United Kingdom) Oliver Jarvis | 77 | **11** | 11 | 4 | **2** | 10 | **2** | 1 | 3 | 6 | 6 | | **268** | **5th** |
| **2019** | (Germany) Mazda Team Joest | Daytona Prototype International | (United States) Tristan Nunez | 77 | **11** | 11 | 4 | **2** | 10 | **2** | 1 | 3 | 6 | 6 | | **268** | **5th** |
| **2019** | (Germany) Mazda Team Joest | Daytona Prototype International | (Germany) Timo Bernhard | 77 | **11** | 11 | | | | **2** | | | | 6 | | **268** | **5th** |
| **2019** | (Germany) Mazda Team Joest | Daytona Prototype International | (Germany) René Rast | 77 | **11** | | | | | | | | | | | **268** | **5th** |
| | | | | | **DAY1** | **DAY2** | **SEB1** | **ELK** | **ATL1** | **MOH** | **ATL2** | **LGA** | **SEB2** | | | Points | Pos |
| **2020** | (Germany) Mazda Team Joest (Canada) Mazda Motorsports | Daytona Prototype International | (United States) Jonathan Bomarito | 55 | 6 | 1 | 5 | 5 | 2 | 4 | 6 | 4 | 1 | | | 260 | 3rd |
| **2020** | (Germany) Mazda Team Joest (Canada) Mazda Motorsports | Daytona Prototype International | (United Kingdom) Harry Tincknell | 55 | 6 | 1 | 5 | 5 | 2 | 4 | 6 | 4 | 1 | | | 260 | 3rd |
| **2020** | (Germany) Mazda Team Joest (Canada) Mazda Motorsports | Daytona Prototype International | (United States) Ryan Hunter-Reay | 55 | 6 | | | | 2 | | 6 | | 1 | | | 260 | 3rd |
| **2020** | (Germany) Mazda Team Joest (Canada) Mazda Motorsports | Daytona Prototype International | (United Kingdom) Oliver Jarvis | 77 | **2** | 2 | 4 | 6 | 7 | 5 | 7 | 5 | 3 | | | **247** | **7th** |
| **2020** | (Germany) Mazda Team Joest (Canada) Mazda Motorsports | Daytona Prototype International | (United States) Tristan Nunez | 77 | **2** | 2 | 4 | 6 | 7 | 5 | 7 | 5 | 3 | | | **247** | **7th** |
| **2020** | (Germany) Mazda Team Joest (Canada) Mazda Motorsports | Daytona Prototype International | (France) Olivier Pla | 77 | **2** | | | | 7 | | 7 | | 3 | | | **247** | **7th** |
| | | | | | **DAY** **Q** | **DAY** **R** | **SEB** | **MOH** | **BEL** | **WGL1** | **WGL2** | **ELK** | **LGA** | **LBH** | **ATL** | Points | Pos |
| **2021** | (Canada) Mazda Motorsports | Daytona Prototype International | (United Kingdom) Oliver Jarvis | 55 | 2 | 3 | 2 | **3** | 4 | 1 | 5 | 2 | 5 | 5 | 1 | 3264 | 3rd |
| **2021** | (Canada) Mazda Motorsports | Daytona Prototype International | (United Kingdom) Harry Tincknell | 55 | 2 | 3 | 2 | **3** | 4 | 1 | 5 | 2 | 5 | 5 | 1 | 3264 | 3rd |
| **2021** | (Canada) Mazda Motorsports | Daytona Prototype International | (United States) Jonathan Bomarito | 55 | | 3 | 2 | 3 | | 1 | | | | | 1 | 3264 | 3rd |
