= Porsche 963 =

Sports prototype racing car

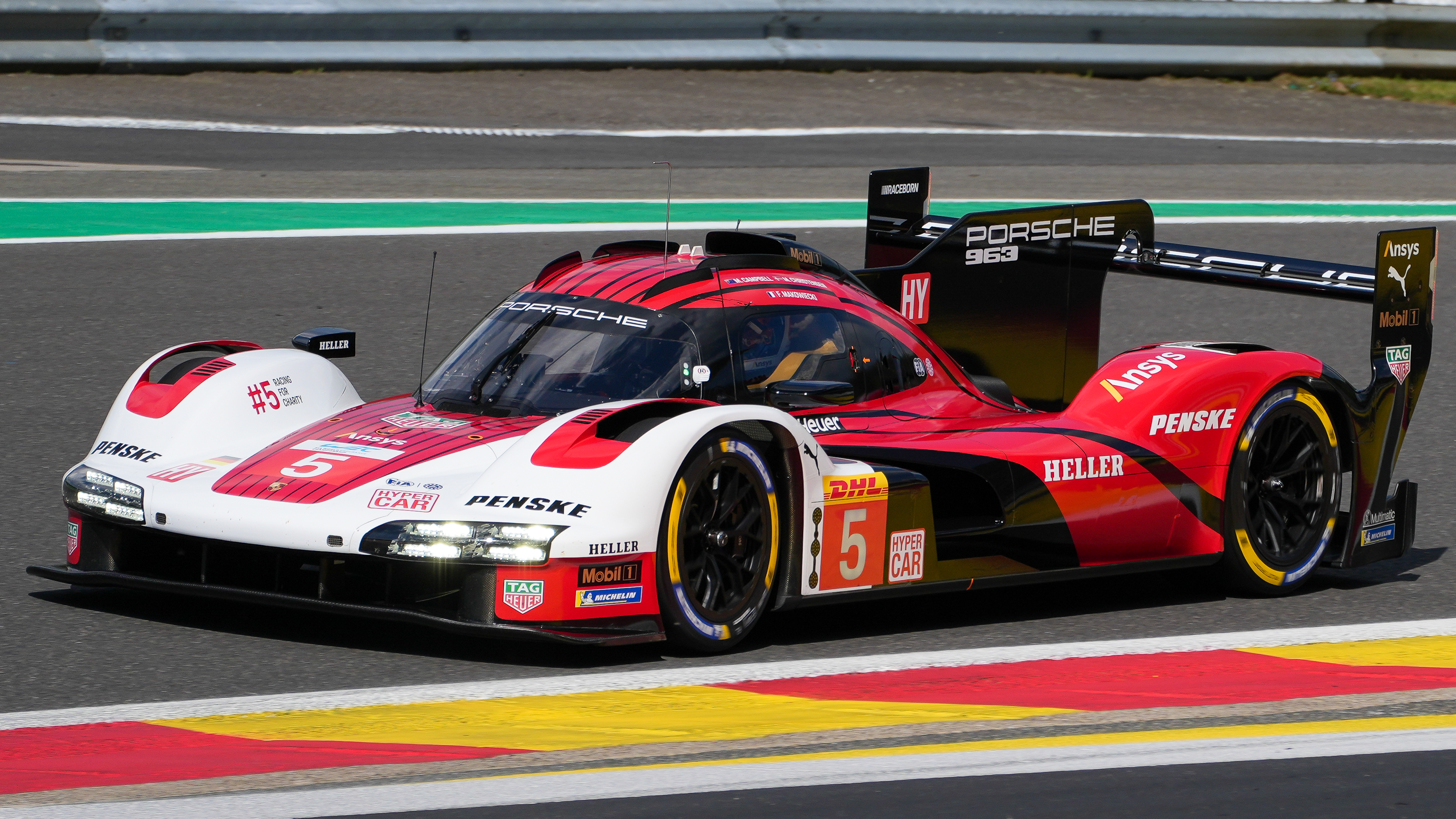
- The No. 5 963 at the 2024 6 Hours of Spa-Francorchamps
- Category: LMDh
- Constructor: Porsche (Multimatic)
- Designers: Grant Larson (Director of Special Projects, Style Porsche); Stéphane Lenglin (Exterior Designer); Christian Eifrig (Technical Project Manager); Stefan Moser (Head Engineer, Powertrain)
- Predecessor: Porsche 919 Hybrid (LMP1); Porsche RS Spyder (LMP2)

Technical specifications
- Chassis: LMP2-based carbon-fibre monocoque with aluminium honeycomb core
- Suspension (front): Double wishbones, pushrods with power steering
- Suspension (rear): Double wishbones, pushrods
- Length: 5,100 mm (200.8 in)
- Width: 2,000 mm (78.7 in)
- Height: 1,060 mm (41.7 in)
- Wheelbase: 3,148 mm (123.9 in)
- Engine: Porsche 9RD 4,593 cc (280.3 cu in) 90° V8 twin-turbocharged, 32-valve, DOHC mid-engine, longitudinally-mounted
- Electric motor: Rear-mounted 50 kW (68 PS; 67 hp) spec MGU supplied by Bosch
- Transmission: Xtrac P1359 7-speed sequential manual
- Power: 500 kW (680 PS; 671 hp)
- Weight: 1,030 kg (2,270.8 lb)
- Fuel: TotalEnergies (WEC); VP Racing Fuels (IMSA)
- Lubricants: Mobil 1 (Porsche Penske Motorsports & Hertz Team Jota); Motul (JDC–Miller MotorSports & Proton Competition)
- Brakes: AP Racing carbon 380/365mm with AP Monobloc 6-piston calipers
- Tyres: Michelin slicks with BBS one-piece forged alloys, 29/71-18 front and 34/71-18 rear

Competition history
- Competition: FIA World Endurance Championship, IMSA SportsCar Championship
- Notable entrants: (Germany) Porsche Penske Motorsport; (United Kingdom) Hertz Team Jota; (United States) JDC–Miller MotorSports; (Germany) Proton Competition
- Notable drivers: (France) Kévin Estre; (Germany) André Lotterer; (Denmark) Michael Christensen; (United States) Dane Cameron; (Brazil) Felipe Nasr; (Australia) Matt Campbell; (France) Mathieu Jaminet; (Belgium) Laurens Vanthoor; (United Kingdom) Nick Tandy; (France) Frederic Makowiecki; (United States) Josef Newgarden; (China) Yifei Ye; (Portugal) António Félix da Costa; (United Kingdom) Will Stevens; (Germany) Mike Rockenfeller; (Netherlands) Tijmen van der Helm; (United Kingdom) Jenson Button; (Italy) Gianmaria Bruni; (United Kingdom) Harry Tincknell; (Switzerland) Neel Jani
- Debut: 2023 24 Hours of Daytona
- First win: 2023 Grand Prix of Long Beach
- Last win: 2026 Petit Le Mans
- Last event: 2026 Petit Le Mans
Races	Wins	Podiums	Poles	F/Laps
40	10	27	7	2
- Teams' Championships: 4 (2023 FIA WEC (FIA Hypercar World Cup), 2024 FIA WEC (FIA Hypercar World Cup), 2024 IMSA SCC, 2025 IMSA SCC)
- Constructors' Championships: 2 (2024 IMSA SCC, 2025 IMSA SCC)
- Drivers' Championships: 3 (2024 IMSA SCC, 2024 FIA WEC, 2025 IMSA SCC)

The Porsche 963 (Type 9R0) is an LMDh sports prototype racing car designed by Porsche and built by Multimatic, to compete in the Hypercar and GTP (Grand Touring Prototype) classes in the FIA World Endurance Championship and IMSA SportsCar Championship, respectively. The 963 name draws inspiration from the Porsche 956 and Porsche 962 that raced in the 1980s, which also competed in American and European racing series. The car was revealed at the 2022 Goodwood Festival of Speed, with a traditional red, white, and black livery.

The official race debut of the 963 was at the 2023 24 Hours of Daytona, the season-opening round of the 2023 IMSA SportsCar Championship. The car was originally slated for a non-competitive dress rehearsal at the 2022 8 Hours of Bahrain, however, Porsche decided later that they would not race at Bahrain in favour of more private testing time. Porsche later announced that the first customer 963s would not be delivered until April 2023 due to delays caused by supply chain disruptions, forcing customer teams to miss the opening races of the IMSA SportsCar Championship and WEC, something that the teams understood when engaging in talks with Porsche to take delivery.

== Background ==
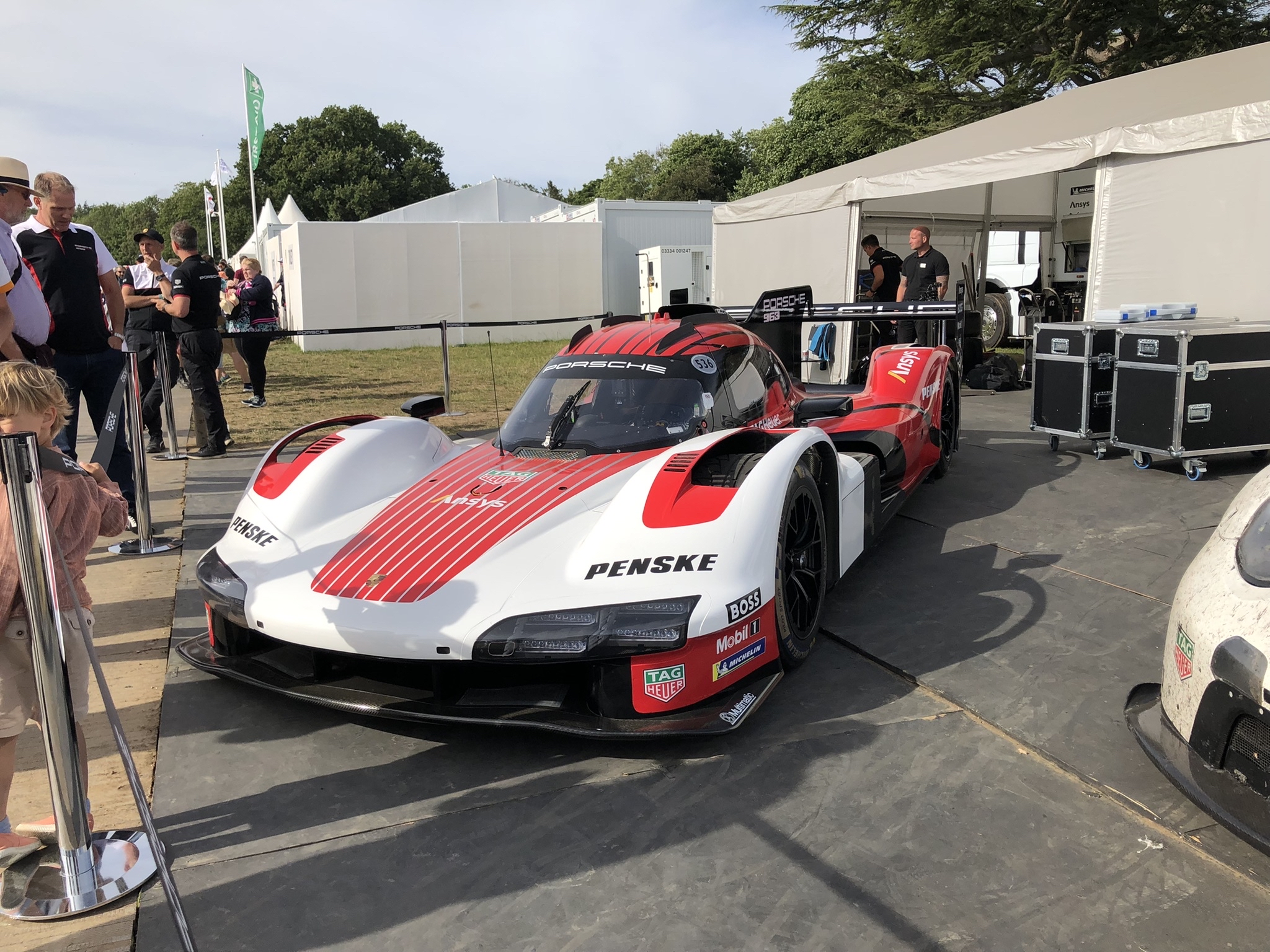
Launch of the 963 at the 2022 Goodwood Festival of Speed

Porsche last competed in the FIA World Endurance Championship's top class, LMP1, back in 2017 with the Porsche 919 Hybrid, and in the IMSA SportsCar Championship with the Porsche RS Spyder in the LMP2 class, with the 919 taking outright championship victory in its final year of competition, and the RS Spyder taking outright championship victory in the American Le Mans Series and class championship victory in the European Le Mans Series. Following the withdrawal of Porsche's factory LMP1 and LMP2 teams from the World Endurance Championship and American Le Mans Series, Porsche maintained a presence in the lower classes with continued factory support for the 911 RSR in the American Le Mans Series' GT2 (later GTLM) class, and in the World Endurance Championship's GTE class. The Automobile Club de l'Ouest, the organiser of the 24 Hours of Le Mans, issued a statement regarding the matter, saying that the club "regrets this precipitous departure, as it does the abruptness of the decision from one of endurance racing's most successful and lauded manufacturers".

As part of the LMDh regulations, interested parties can choose four constructors to partner with to construct the chassis upon to which design the car, those four constructors being Oreca, Ligier, Multimatic and Dallara. Head of Porsche Motorsport Pascal Zurlinden announced in March 2020 that Porsche would be evaluating an entry into LMDh, saying "Porsche is seriously looking into it, but there is no decision yet". This was followed up with an announcement in December that year that development of a LMDh project would commence, meaning Porsche would be the first manufacturer to commit to the LMDh class.

A multi-year partnership with Team Penske to run the factory team under the banner of Porsche Penske Motorsport was announced in May 2021. The announcement marked the commencement of third major collaboration with between Porsche and Team Penske, continuing a decades-old relationship that began with the Porsche 917/30 in Can-Am and blossomed again with the Porsche RS Spyder in LMP2 class of the ALMS. The collaboration aimed to debut with two entries each in the top classes of the 2023 FIA World Endurance Championship and 2023 IMSA SportsCar Championship.

Vice President of Porsche Motorsport Fritz Enzinger commented that "Porsche and Penske shared a proven track record of success" and that "In the long list of victories to date, however, the name Le Mans has been missing. I hope that we will finally be able to chalk up this success as of 2023 with Porsche Penske Motorsport. This would then mark Porsche's 20th overall victory at the Sarthe - a dream come true."

In the same month, Multimatic was revealed to be the constructor that would supply the chassis for which Porsche would design bodywork, with Enzinger saying that "Multimatic is the most obvious and logical solution for us", and that "We have known this highly respected company and its team of experienced professionals for many years and are absolutely convinced of the quality of their work".

Testing commenced at the beginning of 2022, with the first tests being at Porsche's test track at Weissach, where the car's engine choice was also revealed, that being a twin-turbocharged V8, which is developed from the engine found in the Porsche 918 which in turn was developed from the 3,397 cc (207.3 cu in) V8 found in the Porsche RS Spyder, paired with the standardised hybrid parts provided by Williams Advanced Engineering, Bosch and Xtrac. This was followed by an extensive testing program at the Circuit de Barcelona-Catalunya and the Circuit de Spa-Francorchamps, where the car covered over 6,000 km (3,728 mi).

Porsche also announced in May 2022 that four 963s would be allocated to customers for 2023, at the cost of $2.9 million per car, with full factory support. JDC–Miller Motorsports and JOTA Sport both announced on 25 June that they would take delivery of one car each, with JDC MotorSport campaigning the 963 in the IMSA SportsCar Championship and JOTA fielding the car in the FIA World Endurance Championship. In November 2022, Proton Competition was revealed to have purchased the remaining 2 customer entries, fielding a single entry in each in the WEC and IMSA in 2023.

== Racing history ==
=== 2023 ===
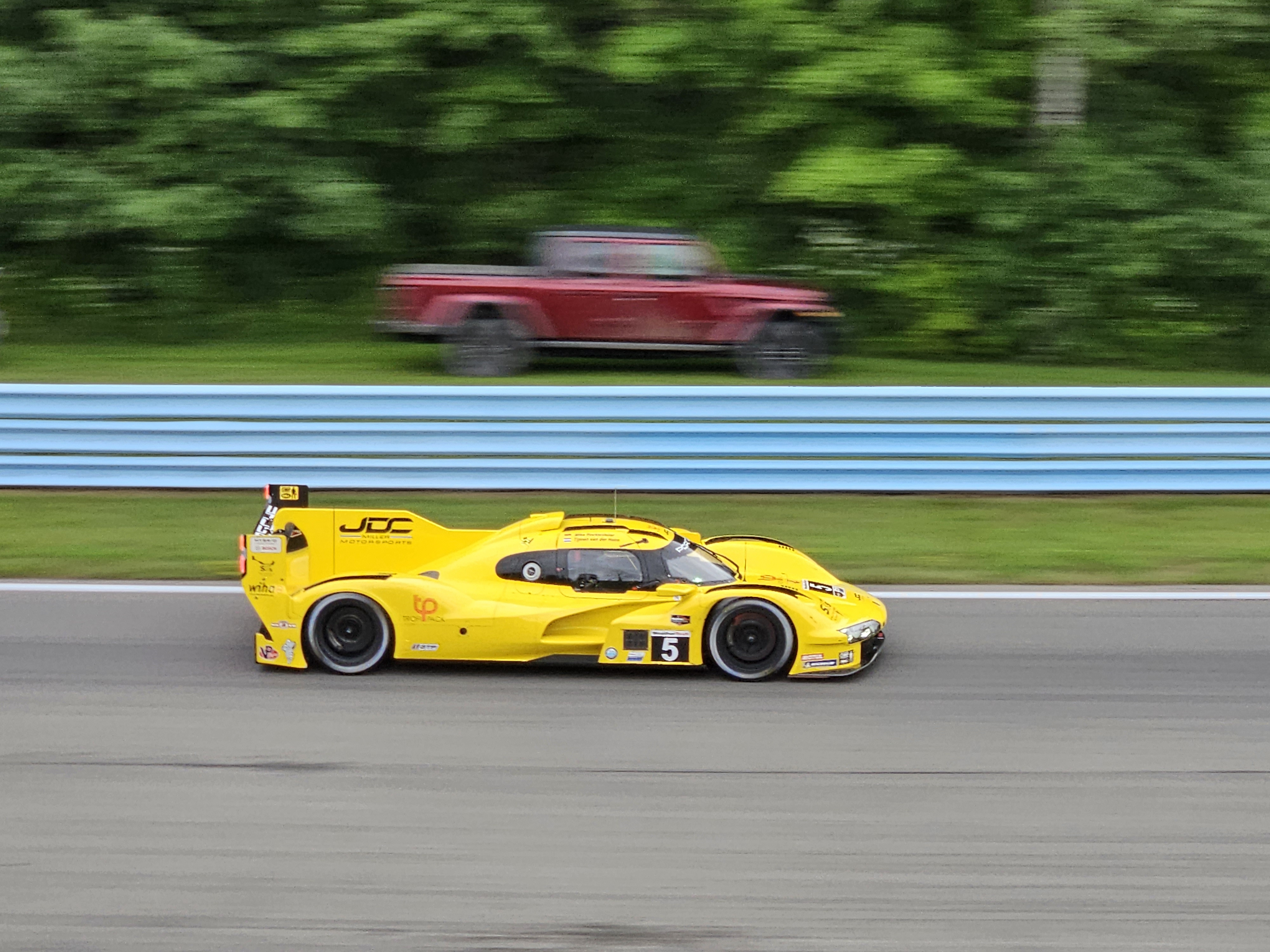
The No. 5 963 at the 2023 Sahlen's Six Hours of The Glen.

Due to supply-chain constraints, Porsche Penske Motorsport, the factory team, was the only team that could field the 963 at its debut at the 2023 24 Hours of Daytona.

The 963 made its first appearance in the practice sessions of the 2023 24 Hours of Daytona alongside the other new GTP cars., the BMW M Hybrid V8, the Acura ARX-06, and the Cadillac V-LMDh. The 963 was often right behind the ARX-06s of Meyer Shank Racing and Wayne Taylor Racing, with the former leading all five practice sessions, bar the last one. During the race, both Porsches were beset by reliability issues, with significant time spent in the garages: No. 7 was the first to come in, losing 35 laps to replace a faulty battery, and Tandy – in No. 6 – had been running in contention for overall victory in the morning until a gearbox failure ended his race.

The Porsche 963 took its first victory in IMSA competition on the Streets of Long Beach with Mathieu Jaminet and Nick Tandy driving. In the season's fourth round, the Motul Course de Monterey, Matt Campbell took the car's first pole position while Tandy's No. 6 started second and van der Helm's No. 5 JDC–Miller Motorsports car qualified ninth. The No. 6 car recovered to second after a slow start. Campbell hit the No. 94 Andretti Autosport Aston Martin Vantage AMR GT3, losing time as he served a drive-through penalty. A crash at turn 10 after Nasr relieved Campbell relegated the No. 7 car to ninth. Tijmen van der Helm and Mike Rockenfeller finished seventh in JDC–Miller Motorsports first race with the car. At Watkins Glen, Tandy and Jaminet started from pole position after qualifying was cancelled. Porsche Penske Motorsport's No. 6 car battled for the win. Through a better pit-stop strategy, the No. 6 Porsche overtook the No. 31 Cadillac and the No. 60 Acura and rejoined in second with 40 minutes remaining. Jaminet overtook Connor De Phillippi in the final minutes before the race ended behind the safety car. The No. 7 car was in contention until Nasr sustained an issue with the hybrid system and spent 2 hours replacing the battery, gearbox and rear axle. It later emerged onto the track and finished 52nd overall. Later, the No. 6 Porsche was disqualified for illegal skid block wear.

=== 2024 ===
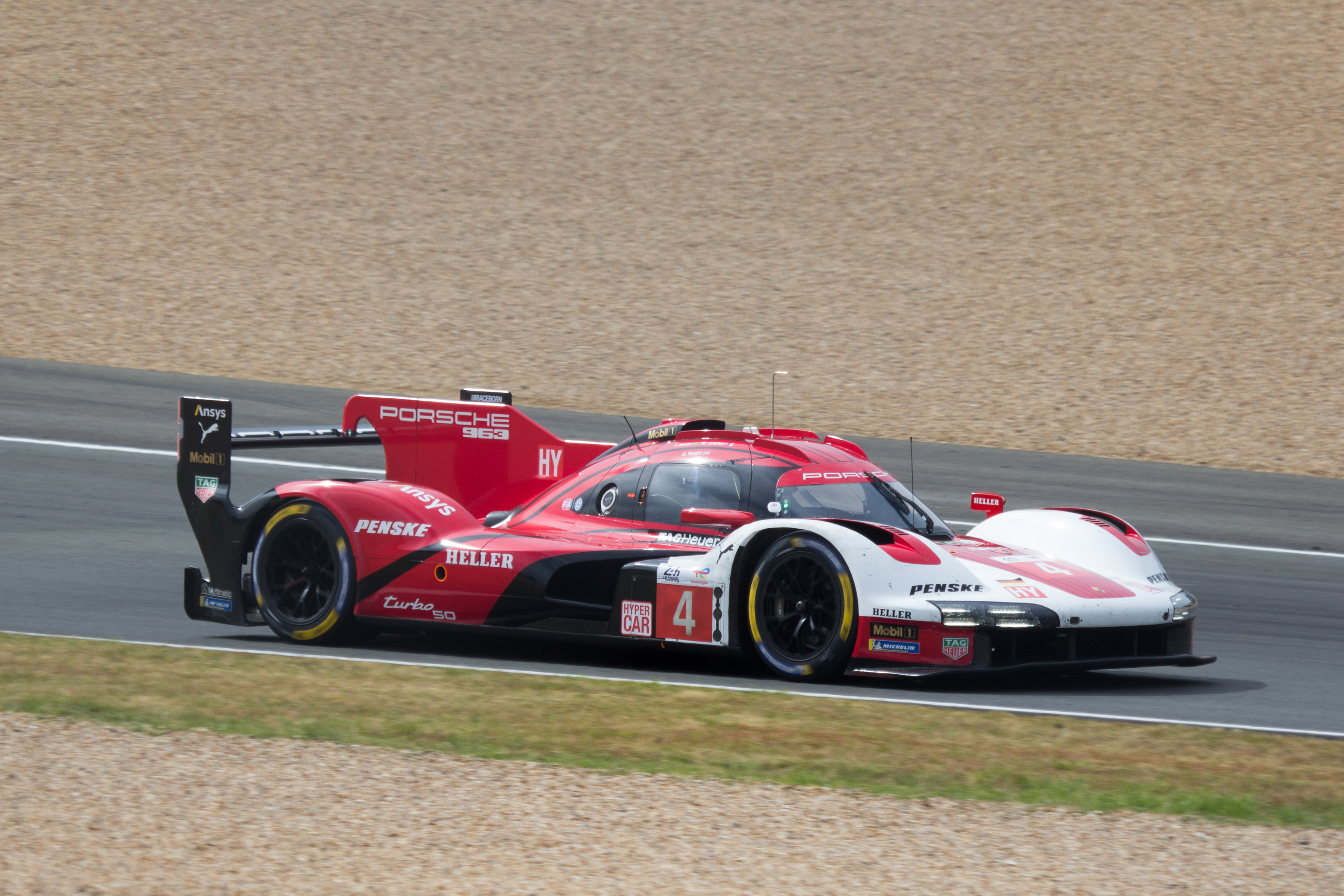
The No. 4 963 at the 2024 24 Hours of Le Mans.

The 963 was highly competitive in both the 2024 FIA World Endurance Championship and the 2024 IMSA SportsCar Championship. The 963 took its first major endurance race victory with a win in the 24 Hours of Daytona, with Porsche Penske Motorsport winning with drivers Dane Cameron, Matt Campbell, Felipe Nasr, and Josef Newgarden. Porsche also later achieved their first victory in the FIA WEC since 2017 at the 2024 Qatar 1812 km, taking home 1st and 3rd, with Hertz Team Jota's customer No. 12 entry in 2nd, completing a podium sweep for the 963, the first Hypercar to do so since the Le Mans Hypercar regulations were introduced in 2021.

The factory Porsche Penskes managed to secure a 1-2 finish in the IMSA GTP Drivers' Championship and the IMSA Michelin Endurance Cup. The No. 7 driven by Dane Cameron and Felipe Nasr won the overall drivers' title, scoring a podium in all but two races. JDC–Miller MotorSports' No. 85 customer entry also scored a podium in the 2024 IMSA Battle on the Bricks after the No. 6 factory Porsche Penske was penalized when a modification of the homologated wiring harness was discovered.

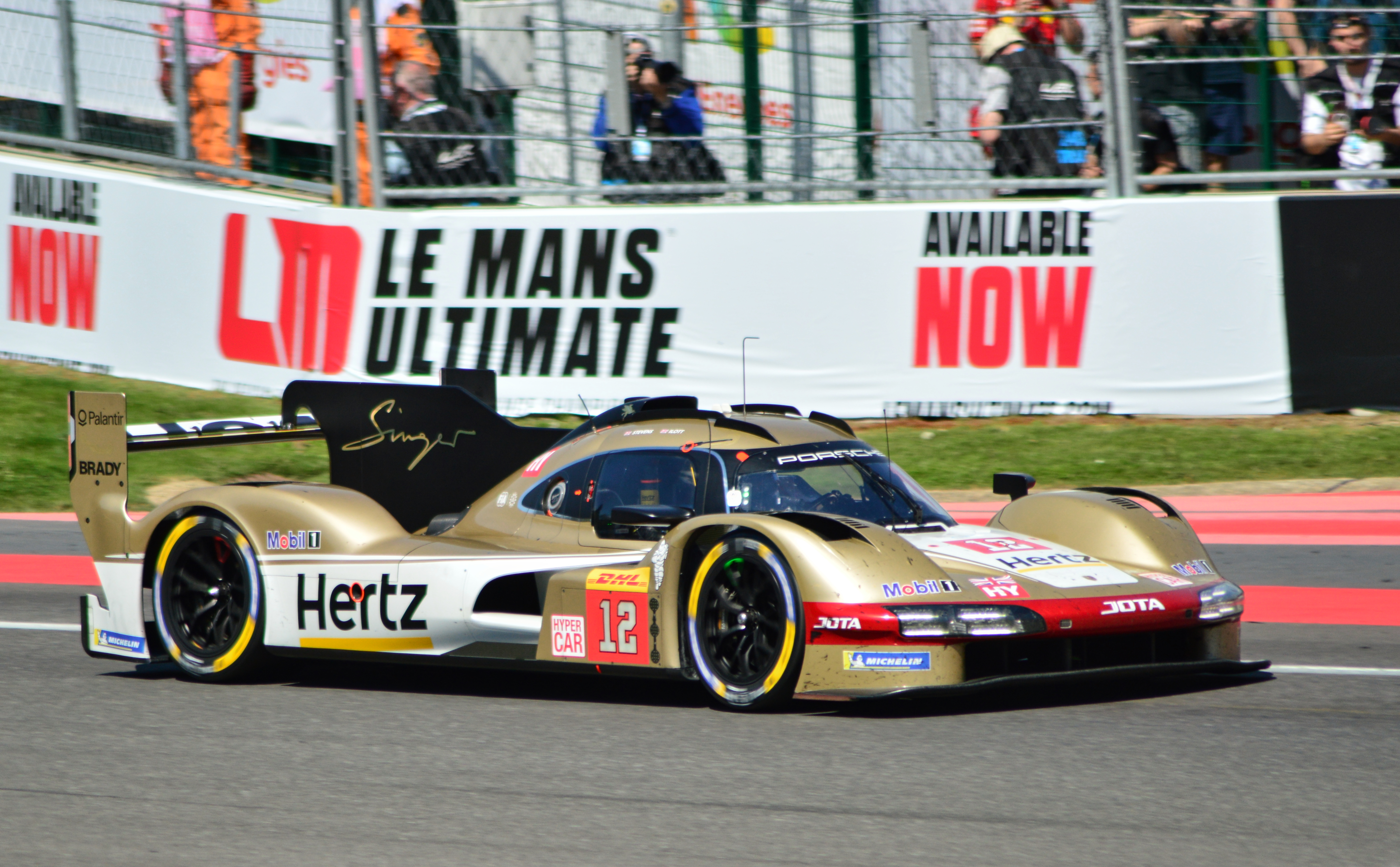
The No. 12 963 (pictured in the 2024 6 Hours of Spa-Francorchamps) ran by Jota won the 2024 FIA World Cup for Hypercar Teams.

The 963 saw two additional wins in the 2024 FIA WEC season after Qatar, including one from Hertz Team Jota, where their No. 12 car piloted by Callum Ilott and Will Stevens won the 2024 6 Hours of Spa-Francorchamps, making them the first customer entry to win a race overall in the series since the introduction of the Hypercar regulations, and the first privateer to do so since Rebellion Racing at the 2020 Lone Star Le Mans. The Spa round was also Proton Competition's most competitive race that year, as their No. 99 car with Julien Andlauer and Neel Jani were towards the front fighting for the race lead, ultimately finishing in 5th. Andlauer also secured the fastest lap of the race. The factory Porsche Penske cars' consistency and reliability would allow them to podium in all but two races that year, and particularly for the No. 6, its performance throughout the season meant they would beat Ferrari and Toyota to the Drivers' Championship, however they would fall short of the Manufacturers' Championship, finishing two points behind Toyota. Hertz Team Jota won the 2024 FIA World Cup for Hypercar Teams as the highest scoring customer team that season.

=== 2025 ===
Porsche saw a dominant start to their IMSA campaign with the 963, winning the first four races of the season at Daytona, Sebring, Long Beach, and Laguna Seca. Their start at WEC was not as fruitful, struggling to keep up with the front runners with a best finish of 8th in its first three races of the season.

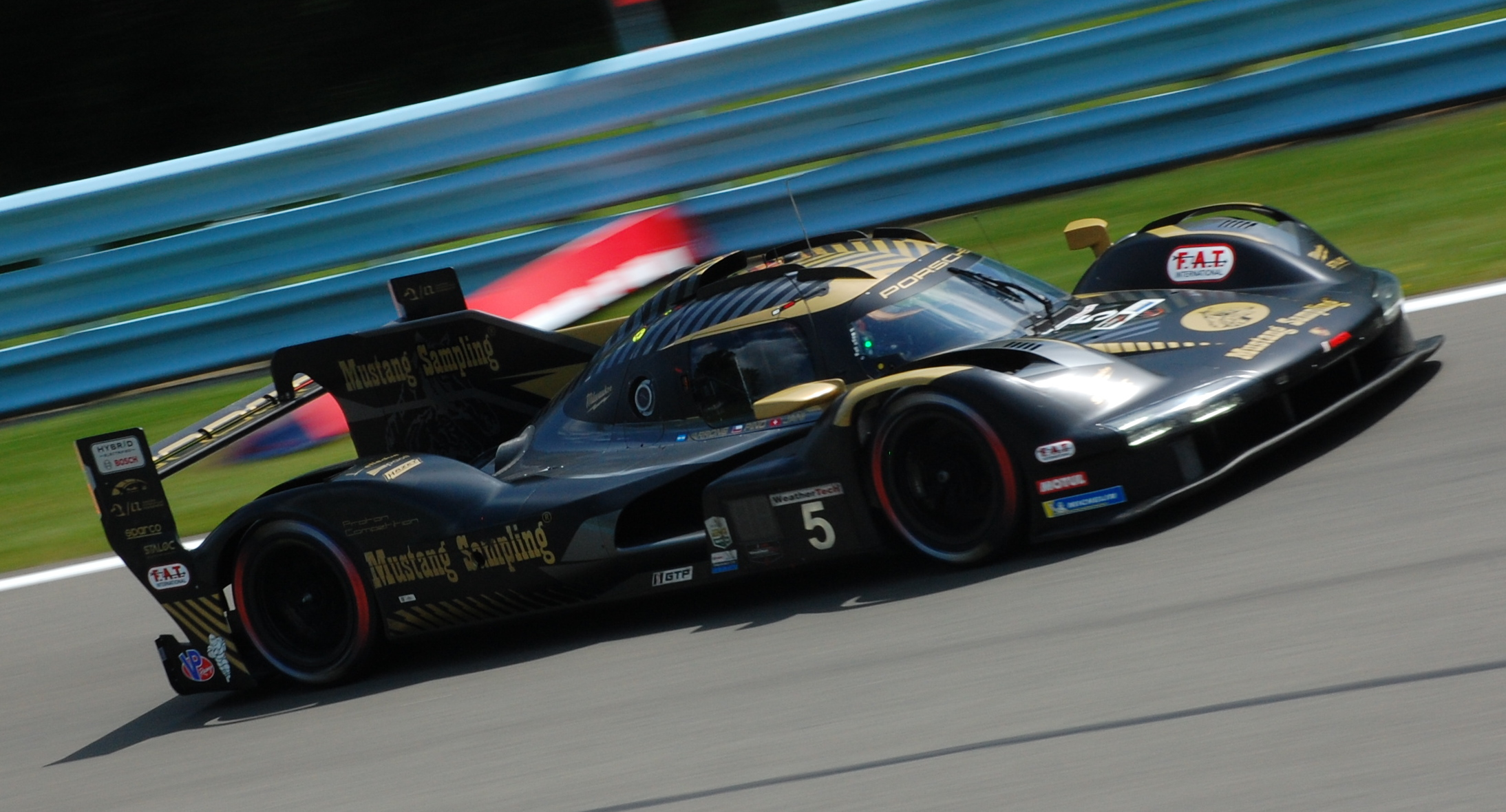
Proton Competition's No. 5 963 during the 2025 Sahlen's Six Hours of The Glen

At the 2025 24 Hours of Le Mans, the 963 saw its best result in the endurance race, the #6 car finishing 2nd overall, 14 seconds behind the race winning #83 Ferrari 499P from AF Corse. The #6 had started the race from the back of the grid in its class, after suffering a disqualification due to a weight infraction. Had it won, it would have been the lowest starting position before a race win in the history of the event.

On 7 October, Porsche announced that they would end their factory programme in the FIA World Endurance Championship after 2025 following financial losses. The Penske IMSA program would continue for 2026.

=== 2026 ===
Racing only in the IMSA series this year, the 963 made a dominant start to the season, with the #7 car winning the 2026 24 Hours of Daytona and taking the checkered flag in a 1-2 finish for the two Porsche Penske cars at the 2026 12 Hours of Sebring. Adjustments to the balance of performance made in response to the car's early success heavily restricted the 963 in the latter portion of the season; the only win the car had until the Petit Le Mans was taken by customer team JDC–Miller at Laguna Seca, with the best performance for a factory car after Sebring being a third-place finish for the #6 at Long Beach. The #6 car would end the 963's winless run at the 2026 Petit Le Mans, allowing the 963 to sweep the major endurance races on the IMSA calendar.

The No. 7 963 of Porsche Penske Motorsport during the 2026 Sahlen's Six Hours of The Glen

As part of Team Penske's 60th anniversary celebrations, both Porsche Penske factory cars used vintage-inspired liveries for the SportsCar Grand Prix at Road America. The #6 car sported a "Sunoco" livery similar to the Porsche 917/30 which dominated the Can-Am series, while the #7 entry was painted in a "DHL" tribute scheme as a Porsche RS Spyder homage, which won the American Le Mans Series on three occasions and marked Porsche's return to prototype racing.

== Racing results ==
=== Complete IMSA SportsCar Championship results ===
(key) Races in bold indicates pole position. Races in italics indicate fastest lap.

Year	Entrants	Class	Drivers	No.	1	2	3	4	5	6	7	8	9	Pts.	Pos.
2023					DAY	SEB	LBH	LAG	WGL	MOS	ELK	IMS	PET		
2023	Porsche Penske Motorsport	GTP	(France) Mathieu Jaminet	6	Ret	Ret	1	2	**9**	5	7	1	Ret	2691	4th
2023	Porsche Penske Motorsport	GTP	(United Kingdom) Nick Tandy	6	Ret	Ret	1	2	**9**	5	7	1	Ret	2691	4th
2023	Porsche Penske Motorsport	GTP	(United States) Dane Cameron	6	Ret	Ret								2691	4th
2023	Porsche Penske Motorsport	GTP	(Belgium) Laurens Vanthoor	6									Ret	2691	4th
2023	Porsche Penske Motorsport	GTP	(Australia) Matt Campbell	7	7	Ret	3	**9**	7	6	1	**2**	4	2691	5th
2023	Porsche Penske Motorsport	GTP	(Brazil) Felipe Nasr	7	7	Ret	3	**9**	7	6	1	**2**	4	2691	5th
2023	Porsche Penske Motorsport	GTP	(Denmark) Michael Christensen	7	7	Ret								2691	5th
2023	Porsche Penske Motorsport	GTP	(United States) Josef Newgarden	7									4	2691	5th
2023	JDC-Miller MotorSports	GTP	(Germany) Mike Rockenfeller	5				7	4	4	5	8	5	1660	9th
2023	JDC-Miller MotorSports	GTP	(Netherlands) Tijmen van der Helm	5				7	4	4	5	8	5	1660	9th
2023	JDC-Miller MotorSports	GTP	(United Kingdom) Jenson Button	5									5	1660	9th
2023	Proton Competition	GTP	(Italy) Gianmaria Bruni	59							8	9	3	814	15th
2023	Proton Competition	GTP	(United Kingdom) Harry Tincknell	59							8	9	3	814	15th
2023	Proton Competition	GTP	(Switzerland) Neel Jani	59									3	814	15th
2024					DAY	SEB	LBH	LGA	DET	WGL	ELK	IMS	ATL		
2024	Proton Competition	GTP	(Italy) Gianmaria Bruni	5	5	8	5	10	Ret	7	5	5	6	2372	9th
2024	Proton Competition	GTP	(Belgium) Alessio Picariello	5	5	8						5	6	2372	9th
2024	Proton Competition	GTP	(France) Romain Dumas	5	5									2372	9th
2024	Proton Competition	GTP	(Switzerland) Neel Jani	5	5									2372	9th
2024	Proton Competition	GTP	(France) Julien Andlauer	5		8								2372	9th
2024	Proton Competition	GTP	(Germany) Mike Rockenfeller	5			5							2372	9th
2024	Proton Competition	GTP	(Netherlands) Bent Viscaal	5				10	Ret	7	5	5	6	2372	9th
2024	Porsche Penske Motorsport	GTP	(France) Mathieu Jaminet	6	4	9	4	1	**2**	3	1	Ret	2	2869	2nd
2024	Porsche Penske Motorsport	GTP	(United Kingdom) Nick Tandy	6	4	9	4	1	**2**	3	1	Ret	2	2869	2nd
2024	Porsche Penske Motorsport	GTP	(France) Kévin Estre	6	4								2	2869	2nd
2024	Porsche Penske Motorsport	GTP	(Belgium) Laurens Vanthoor	6	4									2869	2nd
2024	Porsche Penske Motorsport	GTP	(France) Frédéric Makowiecki	6		9								2869	2nd
2024	Porsche Penske Motorsport	GTP	(United States) Dane Cameron	7	1	3	3	3	4	1	2	Ret	3	2982	1st
2024	Porsche Penske Motorsport	GTP	(Brazil) Felipe Nasr	7	1	3	3	3	4	1	2	Ret	3	2982	1st
2024	Porsche Penske Motorsport	GTP	(Australia) Matt Campbell	7	1	3							3	2982	1st
2024	Porsche Penske Motorsport	GTP	(United States) Josef Newgarden	7	1									2982	1st
2024	JDC-Miller MotorSports	GTP	(United Kingdom) Richard Westbrook	85	6	Ret	7	8	8	Ret	6	3	Ret	2331	10th
2024	JDC-Miller MotorSports	GTP	(Netherlands) Tijmen van der Helm	85	6	Ret	7	8	8	Ret	6	3	Ret	2331	10th
2024	JDC-Miller MotorSports	GTP	(United Kingdom) Philip Hanson	85	6	Ret				Ret		3	Ret	2331	10th
2024	JDC-Miller MotorSports	GTP	(United States) Ben Keating	85	6									2331	10th
2025					DAY	SEB	LBH	LGA	DET	WGL	ELK	IMS	ATL		
2025	Proton Competition	GTP	(France) Julien Andlauer	5	Ret									705	13th
2025	Proton Competition	GTP	(Switzerland) Neel Jani	5	Ret	6				Ret				705	13th
2025	Proton Competition	GTP	(Chile) Nico Pino	5	Ret	6				Ret				705	13th
2025	Proton Competition	GTP	(France) Tristan Vautier	5	Ret	6								705	13th
2025	Proton Competition	GTP	(Argentina) Nicolás Varrone	5						Ret				705	13th
2025	Porsche Penske Motorsport	GTP	(Australia) Matt Campbell	6	3	2	2	1	3	4	5	7	3	2907	1st
2025	Porsche Penske Motorsport	GTP	(France) Kévin Estre	6	3	2							3	2907	1st
2025	Porsche Penske Motorsport	GTP	(France) Mathieu Jaminet	6	3	2	2	1	3	4	5	7	3	2907	1st
2025	Porsche Penske Motorsport	GTP	(Brazil) Felipe Nasr	7	1	1	1	2	4	Ret	11	12	10	2689	3rd
2025	Porsche Penske Motorsport	GTP	(United Kingdom) Nick Tandy	7	1	1	1	2	4	Ret	11	12	10	2689	3rd
2025	Porsche Penske Motorsport	GTP	(Belgium) Laurens Vanthoor	7	1	1							10	2689	3rd
2025	JDC–Miller MotorSports	GTP	(United States) Bryce Aron	85	6									2139	10th
2025	JDC–Miller MotorSports	GTP	(Italy) Gianmaria Bruni	85	6	8	10	9	Ret	Ret	10			2139	10th
2025	JDC–Miller MotorSports	GTP	(Netherlands) Tijmen van der Helm	85	6	8	10	9	Ret	Ret	10	8	12	2139	10th
2025	JDC–Miller MotorSports	GTP	(Germany) Pascal Wehrlein	85	6									2139	10th
2025	JDC–Miller MotorSports	GTP	(Switzerland) Nico Müller	85		8						8		2139	10th
2025	JDC–Miller MotorSports	GTP	(United States) Max Esterson	85									12	2139	10th
2025	JDC–Miller MotorSports	GTP	(Switzerland) Neel Jani	85									12	2139	10th
2026*					DAY	SEB	LBH	LGA	DET	WGL	ELK	IMS	ATL		
2026*	Porsche Penske Motorsport	GTP	(France) Kévin Estre	6	4	2	3	6	8	6	Ret			2010	5th
2026*	Porsche Penske Motorsport	GTP	(Belgium) Laurens Vanthoor	6	4	2	3	6	8	6	Ret			2010	5th
2026*	Porsche Penske Motorsport	GTP	(Australia) Matt Campbell	6	4	2								2010	5th
2026*	Porsche Penske Motorsport	GTP	(France) Julien Andlauer	7	1	1	4	7	5	5	6			2159	3rd
2026*	Porsche Penske Motorsport	GTP	(Brazil) Felipe Nasr	7	1	1	4	7	5	5	6			2159	3rd
2026*	Porsche Penske Motorsport	GTP	(Germany) Laurin Heinrich	7	1	1								2159	3rd
2026*	JDC-Miller MotorSports	GTP	(Netherlands) Tijmen van der Helm	5	7	8	6	1	11	3	2			2045	4th
2026*	JDC-Miller MotorSports	GTP	(Chile) Nico Pino	5	7	8								2045	4th
2026*	JDC-Miller MotorSports	GTP	(United States) Kaylen Frederick	5	7	8				3	2			2045	4th
2026*	JDC-Miller MotorSports	GTP	(Germany) Laurin Heinrich	5			6	1	11	3	2			2045	4th

=== Complete IMSA Michelin Endurance Cup results ===
(key) Races in bold indicates pole position. Races in italics indicates fastest lap.

Year	Entrants	Class	Drivers	No.	1	2	3	4	5	Pts.	Pos.
2023					DAY	SEB	WGL	PET			
2023	Porsche Penske Motorsport	GTP	(France) Mathieu Jaminet	6	Ret	Ret	**9**	Ret		27	6th
2023	Porsche Penske Motorsport	GTP	(United Kingdom) Nick Tandy	6	Ret	Ret	**9**	Ret		27	6th
2023	Porsche Penske Motorsport	GTP	(United States) Dane Cameron	6	Ret	Ret				27	6th
2023	Porsche Penske Motorsport	GTP	(Belgium) Laurens Vanthoor	6				Ret		27	6th
2023	Porsche Penske Motorsport	GTP	(Australia) Matt Campbell	7	7	Ret	7	4		30	4th
2023	Porsche Penske Motorsport	GTP	(Brazil) Felipe Nasr	7	7	Ret	7	4		30	4th
2023	Porsche Penske Motorsport	GTP	(Denmark) Michael Christensen	7	7	Ret				30	4th
2023	Porsche Penske Motorsport	GTP	(United States) Josef Newgarden	7				4		30	4th
2023	JDC-Miller MotorSports	GTP	(Germany) Mike Rockenfeller	5			4	5		10	9th
2023	JDC-Miller MotorSports	GTP	(Netherlands) Tijmen van der Helm	5			4	5		10	9th
2023	JDC-Miller MotorSports	GTP	(United Kingdom) Jenson Button	5				5		10	9th
2023	Proton Competition	GTP	(Italy) Gianmaria Bruni	59				3		7	11th
2023	Proton Competition	GTP	(United Kingdom) Harry Tincknell	59				3		7	11th
2023	Proton Competition	GTP	(Switzerland) Neel Jani	59				3		7	11th
2024					DAY	SEB	WGL	IMS	ATL		
2024	Proton Competition	GTP	(Italy) Gianmaria Bruni	5	5	8	7	5	6	28	9th
2024	Proton Competition	GTP	(Belgium) Alessio Picariello	5	5	8		5	6	28	9th
2024	Proton Competition	GTP	(France) Romain Dumas	5	5					28	9th
2024	Proton Competition	GTP	(Switzerland) Neel Jani	5	5					28	9th
2024	Proton Competition	GTP	(France) Julien Andlauer	5		8				28	9th
2024	Proton Competition	GTP	(Netherlands) Bent Viscaal	5			7	5	6	28	9th
2024	Porsche Penske Motorsport	GTP	(France) Mathieu Jaminet	6	4	9	3	Ret	2	42	3rd
2024	Porsche Penske Motorsport	GTP	(United Kingdom) Nick Tandy	6	4	9	3	Ret	2	42	3rd
2024	Porsche Penske Motorsport	GTP	(France) Kévin Estre	6	4				2	42	3rd
2024	Porsche Penske Motorsport	GTP	(Belgium) Laurens Vanthoor	6	4					42	3rd
2024	Porsche Penske Motorsport	GTP	(France) Frédéric Makowiecki	6		9				42	3rd
2024	Porsche Penske Motorsport	GTP	(United States) Dane Cameron	7	1	3	1	Ret	3	50	1st
2024	Porsche Penske Motorsport	GTP	(Brazil) Felipe Nasr	7	1	3	1	Ret	3	50	1st
2024	Porsche Penske Motorsport	GTP	(Australia) Matt Campbell	7	1	3			3	50	1st
2024	Porsche Penske Motorsport	GTP	(United States) Josef Newgarden	7	1					50	1st
2024	JDC-Miller MotorSports	GTP	(United Kingdom) Richard Westbrook	85	6	Ret	9	3	Ret	32	6th
2024	JDC-Miller MotorSports	GTP	(Netherlands) Tijmen van der Helm	85	6	Ret	9	3	Ret	32	6th
2024	JDC-Miller MotorSports	GTP	(United Kingdom) Philip Hanson	85	6	Ret	9	3	Ret	32	6th
2024	JDC-Miller MotorSports	GTP	(United States) Ben Keating	85	6	Ret				32	6th
2025					DAY	SEB	WGL	IMS	ATL		
2025	Proton Competition	GTP	(France) Julien Andlauer	5	Ret					18	13th
2025	Proton Competition	GTP	(Switzerland) Neel Jani	5	Ret	6	Ret			18	13th
2025	Proton Competition	GTP	(Chile) Nico Pino	5	Ret	6	Ret			18	13th
2025	Proton Competition	GTP	(France) Tristan Vautier	5	Ret	6				18	13th
2025	Proton Competition	GTP	(Argentina) Nicolás Varrone	5			Ret			18	13th
2025	Porsche Penske Motorsport	GTP	(Australia) Matt Campbell	6	3	2	4	7	3	44	3rd
2025	Porsche Penske Motorsport	GTP	(France) Kévin Estre	6	3	2			3	44	3rd
2025	Porsche Penske Motorsport	GTP	(France) Mathieu Jaminet	6	3	2	4	7	3	44	3rd
2025	Porsche Penske Motorsport	GTP	(Brazil) Felipe Nasr	7	1	1	Ret	12	10	46	1st
2025	Porsche Penske Motorsport	GTP	(United Kingdom) Nick Tandy	7	1	1	Ret	12	10	46	1st
2025	Porsche Penske Motorsport	GTP	(Belgium) Laurens Vanthoor	7	1	1			10	46	1st
2025	JDC–Miller MotorSports	GTP	(United States) Bryce Aron	85	6					28	9th
2025	JDC–Miller MotorSports	GTP	(Italy) Gianmaria Bruni	85	6	8	Ret			28	9th
2025	JDC–Miller MotorSports	GTP	(Netherlands) Tijmen van der Helm	85	6	8	Ret	8	12	28	9th
2025	JDC–Miller MotorSports	GTP	(Germany) Pascal Wehrlein	85	6					28	9th
2025	JDC–Miller MotorSports	GTP	(Switzerland) Nico Müller	85		8		8		28	9th
2025	JDC–Miller MotorSports	GTP	(United States) Max Esterson	85					12	28	9th
2025	JDC–Miller MotorSports	GTP	(Switzerland) Neel Jani	85					12	28	9th
2026*					DAY	SEB	WGL	ELK	ATL		
2026*	Porsche Penske Motorsport	GTP	(France) Kévin Estre	6	4	2	6	Ret		33	3rd
2026*	Porsche Penske Motorsport	GTP	(Belgium) Laurens Vanthoor	6	4	2	6	Ret		33	3rd
2026*	Porsche Penske Motorsport	GTP	(Australia) Matt Campbell	6	4	2				33	3rd
2026*	Porsche Penske Motorsport	GTP	(France) Julien Andlauer	7	1	1	5	6		46	1st
2026*	Porsche Penske Motorsport	GTP	(Brazil) Felipe Nasr	7	1	1	5	6		46	1st
2026*	Porsche Penske Motorsport	GTP	(Germany) Laurin Heinrich	7	1	1				46	1st
2026*	JDC-Miller MotorSports	GTP	(Netherlands) Tijmen van der Helm	5	7	8	3	2		25	6th
2026*	JDC-Miller MotorSports	GTP	(Chile) Nico Pino	5	7	8				25	6th
2026*	JDC-Miller MotorSports	GTP	(United States) Kaylen Frederick	5	7	8	3	2		25	6th
2026*	JDC-Miller MotorSports	GTP	(Germany) Laurin Heinrich	5			3	2		25	6th

=== Complete FIA World Endurance Championship results ===
(key) Races in bold indicates pole position. Races in italics indicates fastest lap.

Year	Entrants	Class	Drivers	No.	1	2	3	4	5	6	7	8	Points	Pos
2023					SEB	POR	SPA	LMN	MON	FUJ	BHR			
2023	Porsche Penske Motorsport	Hypercar	(United States) Dane Cameron	5	5	10	4	9	4	12	7		99	3rd
2023	Porsche Penske Motorsport	Hypercar	(Denmark) Michael Christensen	5	5	10	4	9	4	12	7		99	3rd
2023	Porsche Penske Motorsport	Hypercar	(France) Frédéric Makowiecki	5	5	10	4	9	4	12	7		99	3rd
2023	Porsche Penske Motorsport	Hypercar	(France) Kévin Estre	6	6	3	Ret	11	7	3	5		99	3rd
2023	Porsche Penske Motorsport	Hypercar	(Germany) André Lotterer	6	6	3	Ret	11	7	3	5		99	3rd
2023	Porsche Penske Motorsport	Hypercar	(Belgium) Laurens Vanthoor	6	6	3	Ret	11	7	3	5		99	3rd
2023	Porsche Penske Motorsport	Hypercar	(France) Mathieu Jaminet	75				Ret					99	3rd
2023	Porsche Penske Motorsport	Hypercar	(Brazil) Felipe Nasr	75				Ret					99	3rd
2023	Porsche Penske Motorsport	Hypercar	(United Kingdom) Nick Tandy	75				Ret					99	3rd
2023	Hertz Team Jota***	Hypercar	(Portugal) António Félix da Costa	38			6	13	9	6	4		163	1st
2023	Hertz Team Jota***	Hypercar	(United Kingdom) Will Stevens	38			6	13	9	6	4		163	1st
2023	Hertz Team Jota***	Hypercar	(China) Yifei Ye	38			6	13	9	6	4		163	1st
2023	Proton Competition***	Hypercar	(Italy) Gianmaria Bruni	99					Ret	9	10		45	2nd
2023	Proton Competition***	Hypercar	(United Kingdom) Harry Tincknell	99					Ret	9	10		45	2nd
2023	Proton Competition***	Hypercar	(Switzerland) Neel Jani	99					Ret	9	10		45	2nd
2024					QAT	IMO	SPA	LMN	SAP	COA	FUJ	BHR		
2024	Porsche Penske Motorsport	Hypercar	(Australia) Matt Campbell	5	**3**	3	**Ret**	6	3	7	Ret	2	188	2nd
2024	Porsche Penske Motorsport	Hypercar	(Denmark) Michael Christensen	5	**3**	3	**Ret**	6	3	7	Ret	2	188	2nd
2024	Porsche Penske Motorsport	Hypercar	(France) Frédéric Makowiecki	5	**3**	3	**Ret**	6	3	7	Ret	2	188	2nd
2024	Porsche Penske Motorsport	Hypercar	(France) Kévin Estre	6	1	2	2	**4**	2	6	1	10	188	2nd
2024	Porsche Penske Motorsport	Hypercar	(Germany) André Lotterer	6	1	2	2	**4**	2	6	1	10	188	2nd
2024	Porsche Penske Motorsport	Hypercar	(Belgium) Laurens Vanthoor	6	1	2	2	**4**	2	6	1	10	188	2nd
2024	Porsche Penske Motorsport	Hypercar	(France) Mathieu Jaminet	4				Ret					188	2nd
2024	Porsche Penske Motorsport	Hypercar	(Brazil) Felipe Nasr	4				Ret					188	2nd
2024	Porsche Penske Motorsport	Hypercar	(United Kingdom) Nick Tandy	4				Ret					188	2nd
2024	Hertz Team Jota***	Hypercar	(United Kingdom) Callum Ilott	12	2	14	1	8	18	NC	5	13	183	1st
2024	Hertz Team Jota***	Hypercar	(United Kingdom) Will Stevens	12	2	14	1	8	18	NC	5	13	183	1st
2024	Hertz Team Jota***	Hypercar	(France) Norman Nato	12	2	14		8	18	NC	5	13	183	1st
2024	Hertz Team Jota***	Hypercar	(United Kingdom) Jenson Button	38	NC	11	Ret	9	7	10	6	7	153	2nd
2024	Hertz Team Jota***	Hypercar	(United Kingdom) Philip Hanson	38	NC	11	Ret	9	7	10	6	7	153	2nd
2024	Hertz Team Jota***	Hypercar	(Denmark) Oliver Rasmussen	38	NC	11	Ret	9	7	10	6	7	153	2nd
2024	Proton Competition***	Hypercar	(France) Julien Andlauer	99	10	NC	5	14	15	11	11	12	139	4th
2024	Proton Competition***	Hypercar	(Switzerland) Neel Jani	99	10	NC	5	14	15	11	11	12	139	4th
2024	Proton Competition***	Hypercar	(United Kingdom) Harry Tincknell	99	10	NC		14		11	11	12	139	4th
2025					QAT	IMO	SPA	LMN	SAO	COA	FUJ	BHR		
2025	Porsche Penske Motorsport	Hypercar	(France) Julien Andlauer	5	10	11	12	6	3	10	4	14	165	3rd
2025	Porsche Penske Motorsport	Hypercar	(Denmark) Michael Christensen	5	10	11	12	6	3	10	4		165	3rd
2025	Porsche Penske Motorsport	Hypercar	(France) Mathieu Jaminet	5	10	11		6		10	4	14	165	3rd
2025	Porsche Penske Motorsport	Hypercar	(Switzerland) Nico Müller	5			12						165	3rd
2025	Porsche Penske Motorsport	Hypercar	(Germany) Laurin Heinrich	5								14	165	3rd
2025	Porsche Penske Motorsport	Hypercar	(Australia) Matt Campbell	6	11	8		2		1		13	165	3rd
2025	Porsche Penske Motorsport	Hypercar	(France) Kévin Estre	6	11	8	9	2	4	1	3	13	165	3rd
2025	Porsche Penske Motorsport	Hypercar	(Belgium) Laurens Vanthoor	6	11	8	9	2	4	1	3	13	165	3rd
2025	Porsche Penske Motorsport	Hypercar	(Germany) Pascal Wehrlein	6			9						165	3rd
2025	Porsche Penske Motorsport	Hypercar	(Brazil) Felipe Nasr	4				8					165	3rd
2025	Porsche Penske Motorsport	Hypercar	(United Kingdom) Nick Tandy	4				8					165	3rd
2025	Porsche Penske Motorsport	Hypercar	(Germany) Pascal Wehrlein	4				8					165	3rd
2025	Proton Competition***	Hypercar	(Switzerland) Neel Jani	99	15	14	Ret	12	10	13	11	17	162	2nd
2025	Proton Competition***	Hypercar	(Chile) Nico Pino	99	15	14	Ret	12	10	13	11	17	162	2nd
2025	Proton Competition***	Hypercar	(Argentina) Nicolás Varrone	99	15	14	Ret	12	10	13	11	17	162	2nd

* Season still in progress.
** Not eligible for championship points.
*** Points for 2023–2025 for the FIA World Cup for Hypercar Teams.

== 24 Hours of Le Mans results ==
Year	Team	Drivers	Car #	Class	Laps	Pos.	Class Pos.
2023	(Germany) Porsche Penske Motorsport	(United States) Dane Cameron (Denmark) Michael Christensen (France) Frédéric Makowiecki	5	Hypercar	325	16th	9th
2023	(Germany) Porsche Penske Motorsport	(France) Kevin Estre (Germany) Andre Lotterer (Belgium) Laurens Vanthoor	6	Hypercar	320	22nd	11th
2023	(Germany) Porsche Penske Motorsport	(France) Mathieu Jaminet (Brazil) Felipe Nasr (United Kingdom) Nick Tandy	75	Hypercar	84	DNF	DNF
2023	(United Kingdom) Hertz Team Jota	(Portugal) António Félix da Costa (United Kingdom) Will Stevens (China) Yifei Ye	38	Hypercar	244	40th	13th
2024	(Germany) Porsche Penske Motorsport	(France) Mathieu Jaminet (Brazil) Felipe Nasr (United Kingdom) Nick Tandy	4	Hypercar	211	DNF	DNF
2024	(Germany) Porsche Penske Motorsport	(Australia) Matt Campbell (Denmark) Michael Christensen (France) Frédéric Makowiecki	5	Hypercar	311	6th	6th
2024	(Germany) Porsche Penske Motorsport	(France) Kevin Estre (Germany) Andre Lotterer (Belgium) Laurens Vanthoor	6	Hypercar	311	4th	4th
2024	(United Kingdom) Hertz Team Jota	(United Kingdom) Callum Ilott (United Kingdom) Will Stevens (France) Norman Nato	12	Hypercar	311	8th	8th
2024	(United Kingdom) Hertz Team Jota	(United Kingdom) Jenson Button (United Kingdom) Phil Hanson (Denmark) Oliver Rasmussen	38	Hypercar	311	9th	9th
2024	(Germany) Proton Competition	(France) Julien Andlauer (Switzerland) Neel Jani (United Kingdom) Harry Tincknell	99	Hypercar	251	45th	14th
2025	(Germany) Porsche Penske Motorsport	(Brazil) Felipe Nasr (United Kingdom) Nick Tandy (Germany) Pascal Wehrlein	4	Hypercar	386	8th	8th
2025	(Germany) Porsche Penske Motorsport	(France) Julien Andlauer (Denmark) Michael Christensen (France) Mathieu Jaminet	5	Hypercar	386	6th	6th
2025	(Germany) Porsche Penske Motorsport	(Australia) Matt Campbell (France) Kevin Estre (Belgium) Laurens Vanthoor	6	Hypercar	387	2nd	2nd
2025	(Germany) Proton Competition	(Switzerland) Neel Jani (Chile) Nico Pino (Argentina) Nicolás Varrone	99	Hypercar	383	13th	13th

=== Race Victories ===
Year	Series	Race	Track	Car #	Team	Category
2023	IMSA	Grand Prix of Long Beach	(United States) Long Beach Street Circuit	6	(Germany) Porsche Penske Motorsport	GTP
2023	IMSA	IMSA SportsCar Weekend	(United States) Road America	7	(Germany) Porsche Penske Motorsport	GTP
2023	IMSA	IMSA Battle on the Bricks	(United States) Indianapolis Motor Speedway	6	(Germany) Porsche Penske Motorsport	GTP
2024	IMSA	24 Hours of Daytona	(United States) Daytona International Speedway	7	(Germany) Porsche Penske Motorsport	GTP
2024	WEC	Qatar 1812 km	(Qatar) Lusail International Circuit	6	(Germany) Porsche Penske Motorsport	Hypercar
2024	WEC	6 Hours of Spa-Francorchamps	(Belgium) Circuit de Spa-Francorchamps	12	(United Kingdom) Hertz Team Jota	Hypercar
2024	IMSA	Motul Course de Monterey	(United States) WeatherTech Raceway Laguna Seca	6	(Germany) Porsche Penske Motorsport	GTP
2024	WEC	6 Hours of Fuji	(Japan) Fuji Speedway	6	(Germany) Porsche Penske Motorsport	Hypercar
2025	IMSA	24 Hours of Daytona	(United States) Daytona International Speedway	7	(Germany) Porsche Penske Motorsport	GTP
2025	IMSA	12 Hours of Sebring	(United States) Sebring International Raceway	7	(Germany) Porsche Penske Motorsport	GTP
2025	IMSA	Grand Prix of Long Beach	(United States) Long Beach Street Circuit	7	(Germany) Porsche Penske Motorsport	GTP
2025	IMSA	Monterey SportsCar Championship	(United States) WeatherTech Raceway Laguna Seca	6	(Germany) Porsche Penske Motorsport	GTP
2025	WEC	Lone Star Le Mans	(United States) Circuit of the Americas	6	(Germany) Porsche Penske Motorsport	Hypercar
2026	IMSA	24 Hours of Daytona	(United States) Daytona International Speedway	7	(Germany) Porsche Penske Motorsport	GTP
2026	IMSA	12 Hours of Sebring	(United States) Sebring International Raceway	7	(Germany) Porsche Penske Motorsport	GTP
2026	IMSA	Monterey SportsCar Championship	(United States) WeatherTech Raceway Laguna Seca	5	(United States) JDC–Miller MotorSports	GTP
2026	IMSA	Petit Le Mans	(United States) Road Atlanta	6	(Germany) Porsche Penske Motorsport	GTP

* Season still in progress.

== Street-legal version ==
Porsche 963 RSP
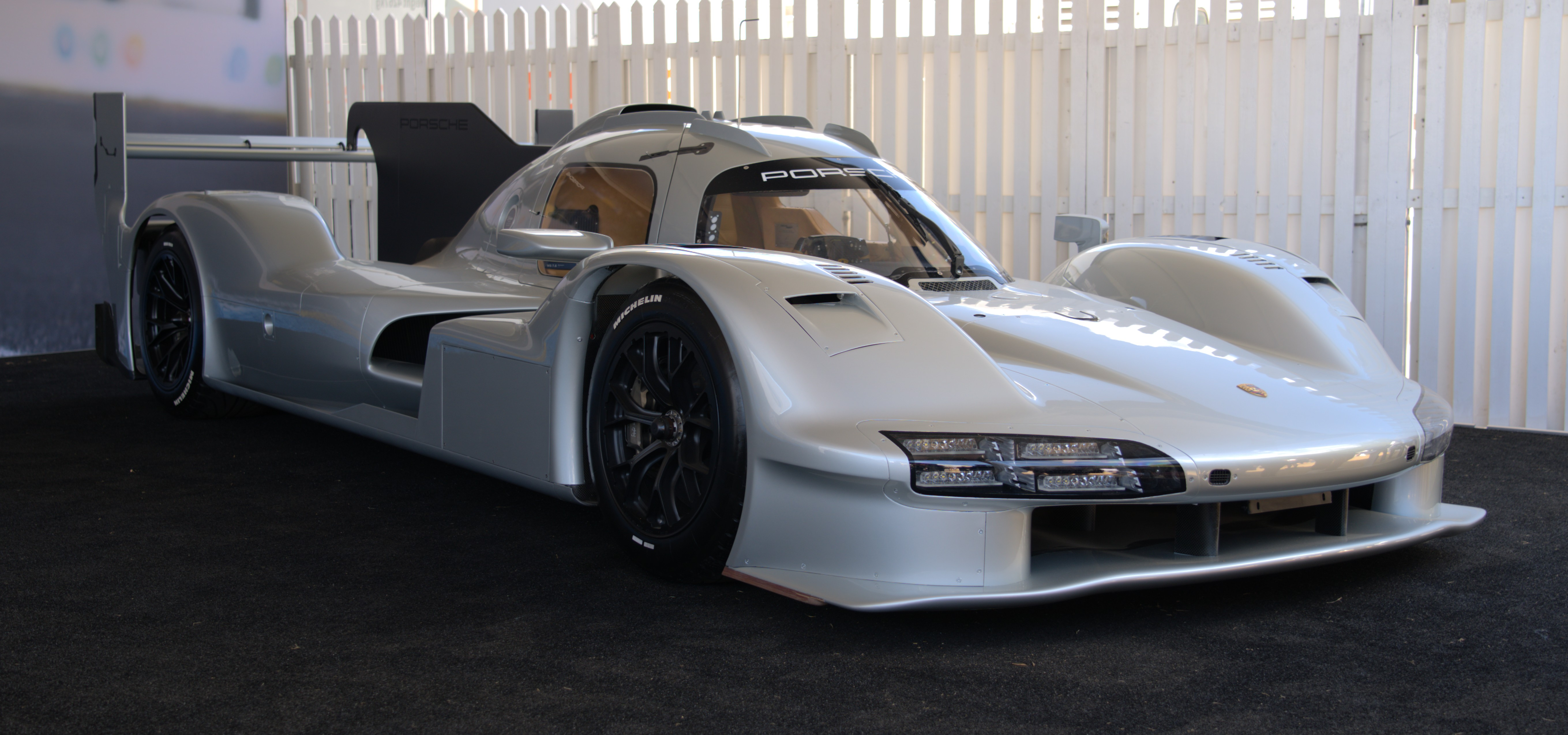
- The Porsche 963 RSP at the 2025 Goodwood Festival of Speed

Overview
- Manufacturer: Porsche
- Production: 2025 (1 unit)
- Assembly: Stuttgart, Germany
- Designer: Grant Larson

Body and chassis
- Body style: 2-door coupé
- Layout: Rear mid-engine, rear-wheel-drive

Powertrain
- Engine: Porsche 9RD 4,593 cc (280.3 cu in) 90° V8 twin-turbocharged, 32-valve, DOHC mid-engine, longitudinally-mounted
- Transmission: sequential manual
- Propulsion: Hybrid electric (rear-axle motor generator unit)

Dimensions
- Wheelbase: 3,148 mm (123.9 in)
- Length: 5,100 mm (200.8 in)
- Width: 2,000 mm (78.7 in)

Porsche released a street-legal version of the 963 in June 2025. Its name, 963 RSP, is derived from the initials of the owner of Porsche's motorsport partner Team Penske, Roger Searle Penske. It is built as a one-off commission for Penske and costs in the range of €5 million.

Compared to the standard 963 race car, the RSP features a number of modifications to comply with road regulations. The car now features turn signals, brake lights, a horn and cup holders alongside revised bodywork and increased ride height. The car was extensively reworked by Porsche's sonderwunsch (special wish) division, incorporating a silver finish on the exterior and a custom tan leather and Alcantara interior both inspired by the Porsche 917.

The hybrid V8 powertrain and seven-speed sequential gearbox from Xtrac were carried over directly from the race car, though not without a few essential tweaks. The rear-mounted electric motor and generator were remapped for smoother power delivery, while the mid-mounted, twin-turbo 4.6-liter V8, which is good for around 671 hp (500 kW / 680 PS), was reconfigured to run on standard pump gas.

Despite these changes, the 963 RSP is not fully homologated for general road use. It has special permission from French authorities to be driven on public roads and is instead only allowed on the street "under special circumstances and in accordance with local requirements."
