= LMDh =

Type of sports prototype race car

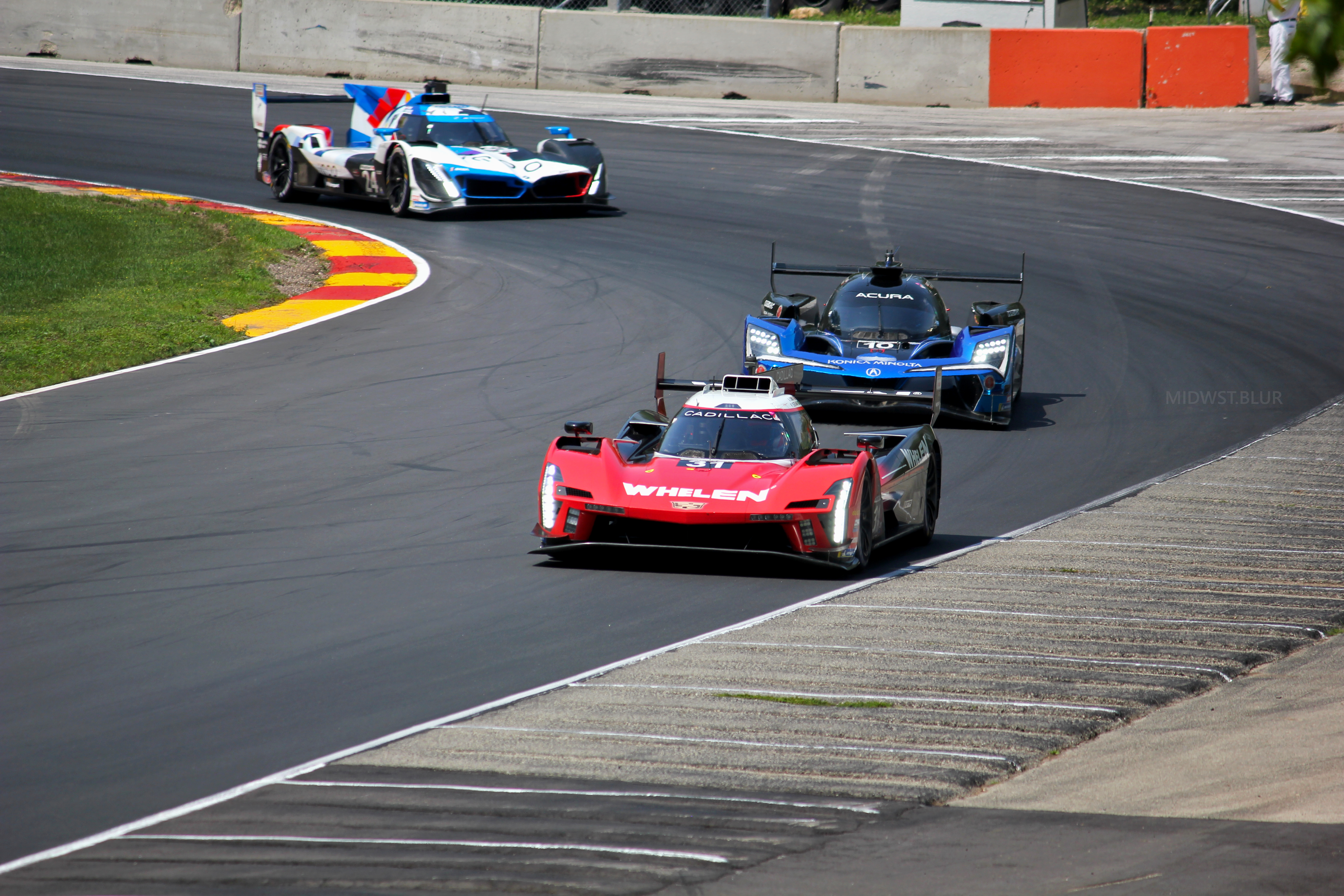
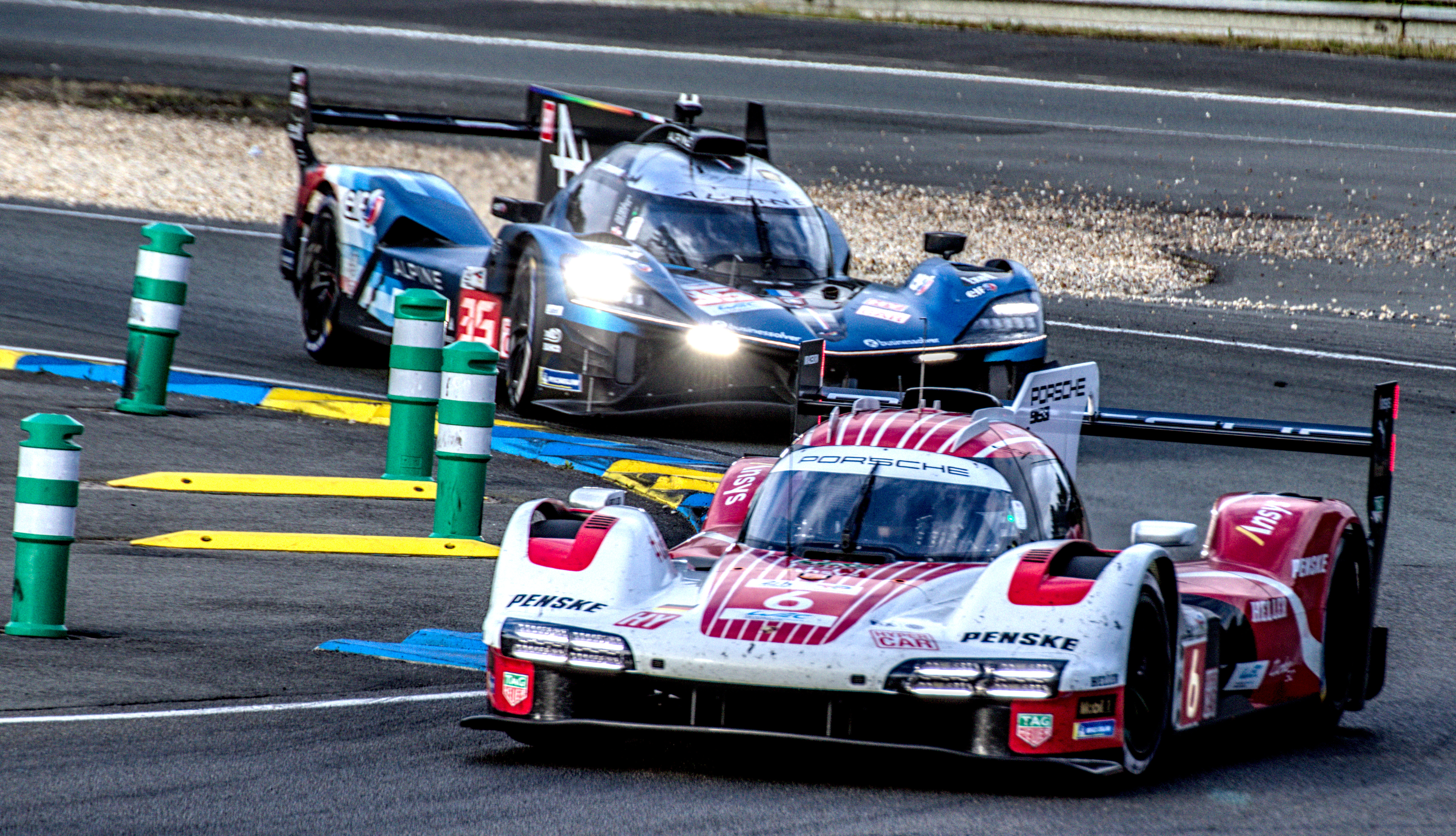
A group of cars at Road America and Le Mans respectively, featuring five LMDh manufacturers

LMDh (Le Mans Daytona h) is a set of sports prototype regulations used alongside Le Mans Hypercar (LMH) in both the Grand Touring Prototype (GTP) class of the IMSA SportsCar Championship and the Hypercar class of the FIA World Endurance Championship.

The LMDh ruleset was created jointly by the International Motor Sports Association (IMSA) and the Automobile Club de l'Ouest (ACO). The cars serve as the successor to the Daytona Prototype International class, converging regulations that were planned to become the next-generation Daytona Prototype International ruleset with the Le Mans Hypercar ruleset.

The FIA World Motor Sport Council had allowed LMDh cars to participate in the 2022 WEC season on a race-by-race basis, "to ensure the seamless introduction" in 2023; however, no LMDh cars would end up participating at any of the 2022 season races, and they would instead make their debut in the 2023 season.

== History ==
=== DPi 2.0 ===
Following the FIA World Endurance Championship's transition to a winter calendar in 2018, IMSA announced in January 2018, that it would extend the homologation periods for LMP2, DPi and GTE-spec machinery in the WeatherTech SportsCar Championship by an additional year. This would delay the homologation periods in the championship by roughly six months, which necessitated the homologation extension from IMSA. As such, the DPi and LMP2 cars, which were originally confirmed for a four-year period through 2020, would now be eligible for competition until at least the end of the 2021 season. Despite calls from manufacturers to retain the DPi platform and regulations for the 2022 season, then-IMSA President Scott Atherton announced that IMSA was looking at other options beyond a further extension to the life of the DPi platform.

On May 6, 2019, IMSA announced that the next generation DPi ruleset, known as DPi 2.0 would be an evolution based on the current LMP2-based platform, featuring hybrid technology from a single supplier, with supply voltage being unconfirmed. A few days later, IMSA's VP of Competition Simon Hodgson stated that the next-generation DPi regulations would be expected to feature increased styling measures, by opening up more areas where manufacturers were able to add styling cues. Hodgson also indicated that the enlarged scope for styling cues may also come alongside regulations that dictated minimum level of styling required from each manufacturer.

On June 24, 2019, it was revealed that IMSA had held discussions with manufacturers regarding the incorporation of hybrid technology in the next-generation DPi ruleset, with manufacturers on the DPi 2.0 steering committee divided over the level electrification in the hybrid systems. Electrification concepts proposed included high and low-voltage systems of varying costs. A further meeting held in late June saw a 400-volt system, providing in the range of 70-90 kW (90-120 hp) of electric power emerge as the leading electrification option. However, despite 400-volt systems having emerged as the leading option in June, it was revealed in September that discussions had yet to reach any form of consensus, although it was agreed that manufacturers could build their own hybrid systems.

=== DPi 2.0 and LMH convergence ===
Following the 2019 "Super Sebring" weekend which saw the 2019 12 Hours of Sebring held on the same weekend as the inaugural 1000 Miles of Sebring, WEC CEO Gerard Neveu revealed the possibility of DPi becoming included as part of the "Hypercar" regulations, with the integration of DPis depending on the performance levels of both platforms. On July 31, 2019, FIA World Endurance Championship CEO Gerard Neveu revealed that an active effort was underway between the ACO and IMSA technical departments to seek similar performance targets between Hypercar and DPi 2.0, which would allow for both platforms to eventually crossover and compete head to head.

On November 11, 2019, WEC's sole LMP1 manufacturer Toyota stated it would be open for DPi integration into the FIA World Endurance Championship's top class, on the condition it would not hinder the Japanese manufacturer from displaying its hybrid technology. Shortly after the release of the LMH Technical regulations, McLaren announced it would not be considering a LMH programme, and instead called for DPi to be brought into the WEC, with McLaren Racing CEO Zak Brown stating that a LMH programme was unviable for the British manufacturer, calling for steep reduction in costs. Ford and Porsche expressed similar sentiments, calling for convergence between LMH and DPi.

On 15 January 2020, Toyota Racing Development president and general manager David Wilson expressed support for convergence between both platforms, stating that convergence of the two platforms would serve as a compelling reason for Lexus to launch a DPi programme.

=== LMDh ===
On 24 January 2020, ahead of the 2020 24 Hours of Daytona, a joint ACO and IMSA press conference was held at the Daytona International Speedway, to announced Le Mans Daytona h (LMDh), a set of regulations intended to supersede the existing Daytona Prototype International (DPi) cars ran at the time as the top class in the IMSA Sportscar Championship. It was also announced that LMDh was to be converged with the incoming Le Mans Hypercar regulations allowing both LMH and LMDh entries to compete in the top class in both the WEC and IMSA's premier series. It was planned to first be introduced in Europe starting from September 2021, before having its North American debut in 2022 at the 2022 Rolex 24 at Daytona.

Despite initial plans to allow manufacturers to build their own hybrid systems, this was scrapped in the draft LMDh regulations released in May, in favour of a spec 50 kW (67 hp) hybrid system. The draft regulations stated that a car weight of 1,030 kg (2,270 lb), 500 kW (670 hp) peak of combined power from engine and hybrid system, a single bodywork package, a single tyre supplier, alongside a global Balance of Performance system to balance out LMDh and LMH cars. The gearbox hybrid system will be supplied by Xtrac with an integrated motor generator unit supplied by Bosch and batteries from Williams Advanced Engineering. The chassis suppliers will be Dallara, Ligier, Multimatic, and Oreca.

In January 2022, IMSA confirmed the name for the class would be GTP, in reference to the 1980s category of the same name. The class debuted in IMSA at the 2023 24 Hours of Daytona with four different manufacturers entering a total of nine cars. LMDh entries comprised the entirety of the class in 2023 and 2024, only racing alongside an LMH entry for the first time with the introduction of the Aston Martin Valkyrie AMR-LMH for the 12 Hours of Sebring in 2025.

While the World Endurance Championship introduced their equivalent to GTP in 2021, with the class known simply as Hypercar, LMDh cars wouldn't compete in the series for the first time until 2023, with the class containing LMH cars from Toyota, Glickenhaus and latterly Peugeot alongside and an Oreca-built LMP1 car operated by Alpine in its first two seasons.

In 2025, it was announced that the Hypercar class would be allowed to participate in the Asian Le Mans Series with customer teams and Pro/Am lineups. This also meant that LMDh vehicles would be eligible to compete in the AsLMS starting from the 2026/27 season.

== Manufacturers ==
| Manufacturer | Model | Picture | Chassis | Debut | Source |
|---|---|---|---|---|---|
| Acura | ARX-06 | | Oreca | 2023 24 Hours of Daytona | |
| BMW | M Hybrid V8 | | Dallara | 2023 24 Hours of Daytona | |
| Cadillac | V-Series.R | | Dallara | 2023 24 Hours of Daytona | |
| Porsche | 963 | | Multimatic | 2023 24 Hours of Daytona | |
| Alpine | A424 | | Oreca | 2024 Qatar 1812 km | |
| Lamborghini | SC63 | | Ligier | 2024 Qatar 1812 km | |
| Genesis | GMR-001 | | Oreca | 2026 6 Hours of Imola | |
| Ford | TBA | | Oreca | 2027 | |
| McLaren | MCL-HY | | Dallara | 2027 | |

== See also ==
- Group 5
- Group 6
- Group C
- IMSA GTP
- Daytona Prototype
- Le Mans Prototype
