= Riley-Multimatic MkXXX =

Le Mans race car

Riley-Multimatic Mk30
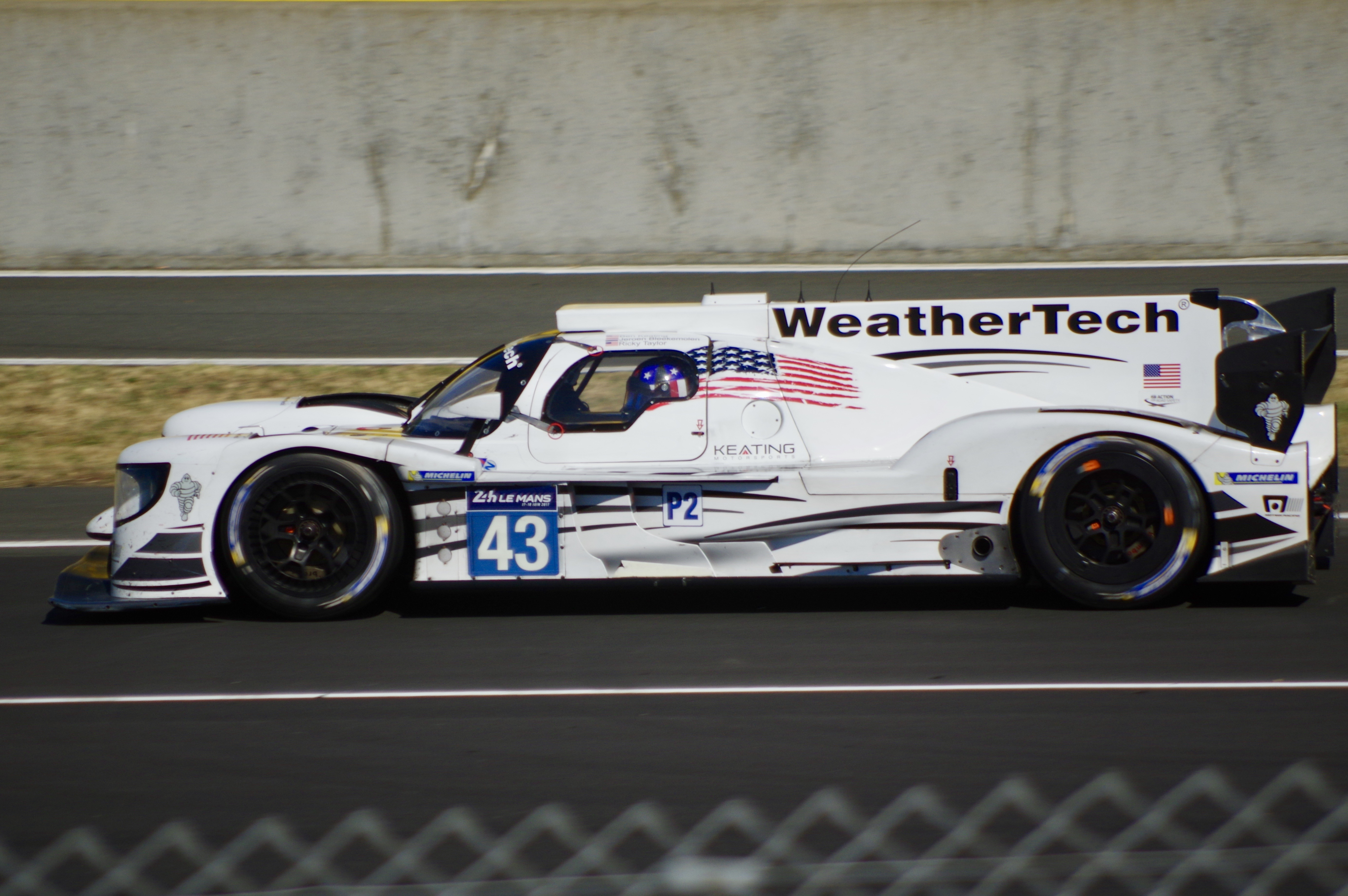
- #43 Riley-Gibson at the 2017 24 Hours of Le Mans
- Category: Le Mans Prototype 2
- Constructor: Riley Technologies/Multimatic Motorsports
- Designers: Mark Handford, Bob & Bill Riley

Technical specifications
- Chassis: Carbon Fibre Monocoque
- Suspension (front): Independent Double A Arms
- Engine: Riley-Multimatic Mk30: Gibson GK428 4.2 L V8 Mazda RT24-P: Mazda MZ-2.0T 2.0 L Turbocharged Inline-4
- Weight: 2,050 lb (930 kg) including driver
- Fuel: VP Racing Fuels MS100 RON unleaded 80% + E20 American Ethanol 20%
- Lubricants: Total
- Brakes: Brembo Calliper, Hitco Carbon Disc and Pads
- Tyres: Continental, Michelin

Competition history
- Notable entrants: Riley-Multimatic Mk30: (United States) Spirit of Daytona Racing (United States) Keating Motorsports (United States) BAR1 Motorsports (United States) Rick Ware Racing Mazda RT24-P: (United States) Mazda Motorsports (Germany) Mazda Team Joest
- Debut: 2017 Rolex 24 at Daytona
Races	Wins	Podiums
56	7	19

The Riley-Multimatic MkXXX, also known as the Riley-Multimatic Mk.30, or simply the Riley Mk.30, is a Le Mans Prototype 2 built to the 2017 FIA/ACO regulations. This car can be raced globally in the European Le Mans Series, Asian Le Mans Series, the FIA World Endurance Championship, and the IMSA sanctioned WeatherTech Sportscar Championship. It made its racing debut at the 2017 Rolex 24 at Daytona, scoring a podium finish, with Spirit of Daytona Racing.

== Development ==
On 22 August 2014, Riley Technologies first laid out plans for building a next-generation prototype for the new-for-2017 global LMP2 regulations, with the project being the first non-Daytona Prototype sportscar racing prototype design to be developed by the company, since the aborted Riley MkXXV from 2011.

On 9 July 2015, the Automobile Club de l'Ouest announced that the Riley-Multimatic partnership had been selected as 1 of the 4 chassis manufacturers for the new for 2017 regulations.

The car is a result of the joint bid between Riley Technologies and Multimatic Motorsports, for one of the four licenses to build the new for 2017 Le Mans Prototype 2 cars. Multimatic would take charge over the carbon fiber tub, vehicular bodywork and aerodynamic aspects of the car, whilst Riley would design and manufacture the majority of the mechanical components on the Mk30, including the suspension and assembly of the car. The car was shaken down in December 2016, by customer Spirit Of Daytona Racing, at Carolina Motorsports Park.

On 15 June 2017, Multimatic Motorsports revealed that it had taken the lead role in the Riley-Multimatic LMP2 programme, a departure from the initial shared lead, that had Riley Technologies leading the commercial aspects of the LMP2 programme, and Multimatic focusing on the DPi aspect of the programme.

The car has been known to be extremely draggy, even in low drag configuration at Le Mans.

== Mazda RT24-P ==
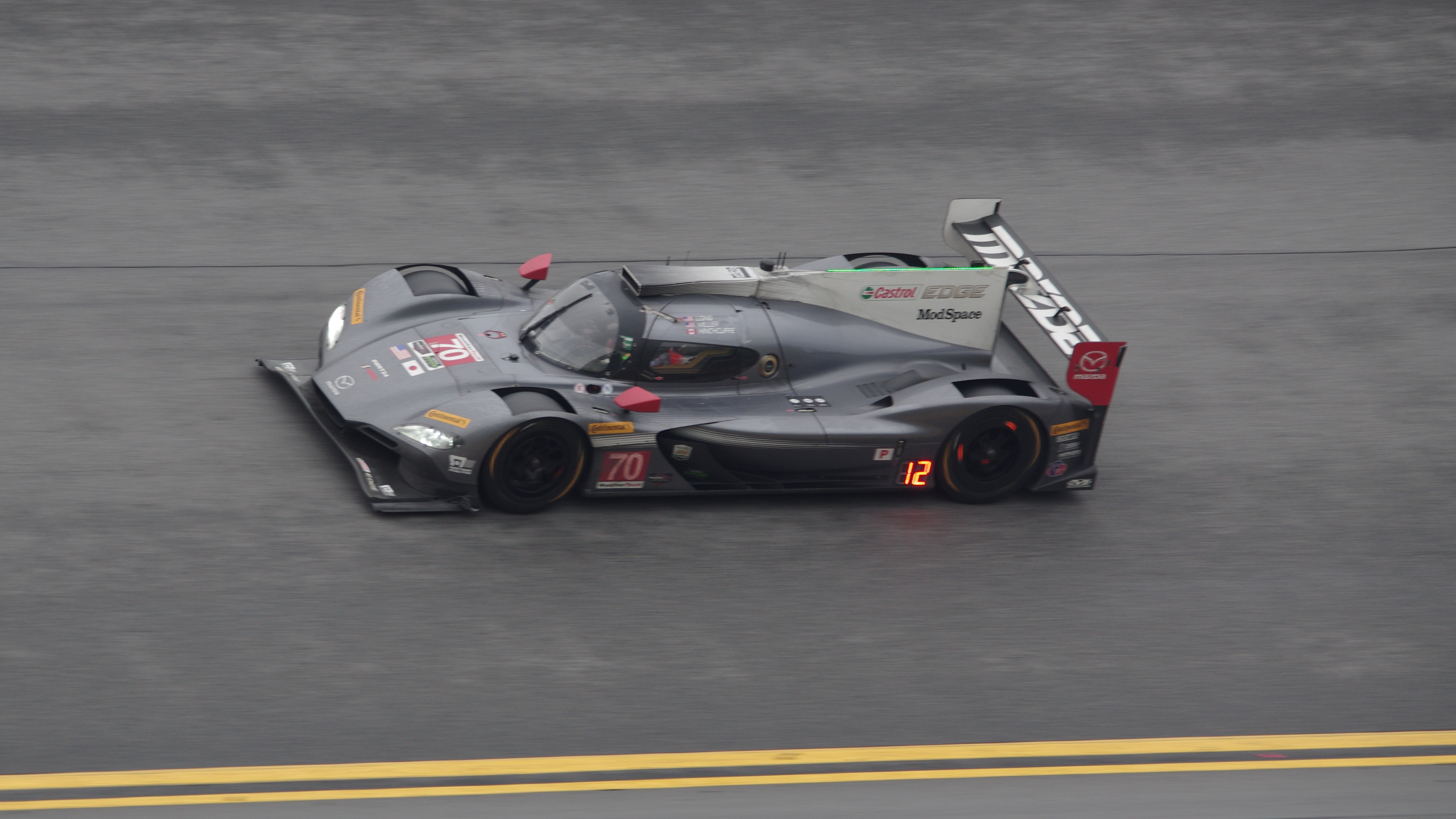
#70 Mazda Prototype Team Mazda RT-24P

A variation of the prototype, the Mazda RT24-P, was created for the IMSA's WeatherTech SportsCar Championship Prototype class under the DPi regulations. The car was developed in partnership with Mazda Motorsports, and initially SpeedSource Race Engineering, as well as Multimatic. In place of a Gibson V8, a Mazda MZ-2.0T 2.0 L Turbo I4 sits in its place. Other alterations from the Mk30 include a revised sidepod, as well as nose. The cars made their debut at the 2017 Rolex 24 Hours with the SpeedSource Team, before the cars were withdrawn from competition for redevelopment following the Mobil1 Sportscar Grand Prix, held at the Canadian Tire Motorsports Park. One prototype ran in the WeatherTech SportsCar Championship, with Multimatic Motorsports.
