= Daytona Prototype International =

Type of sports prototype race car

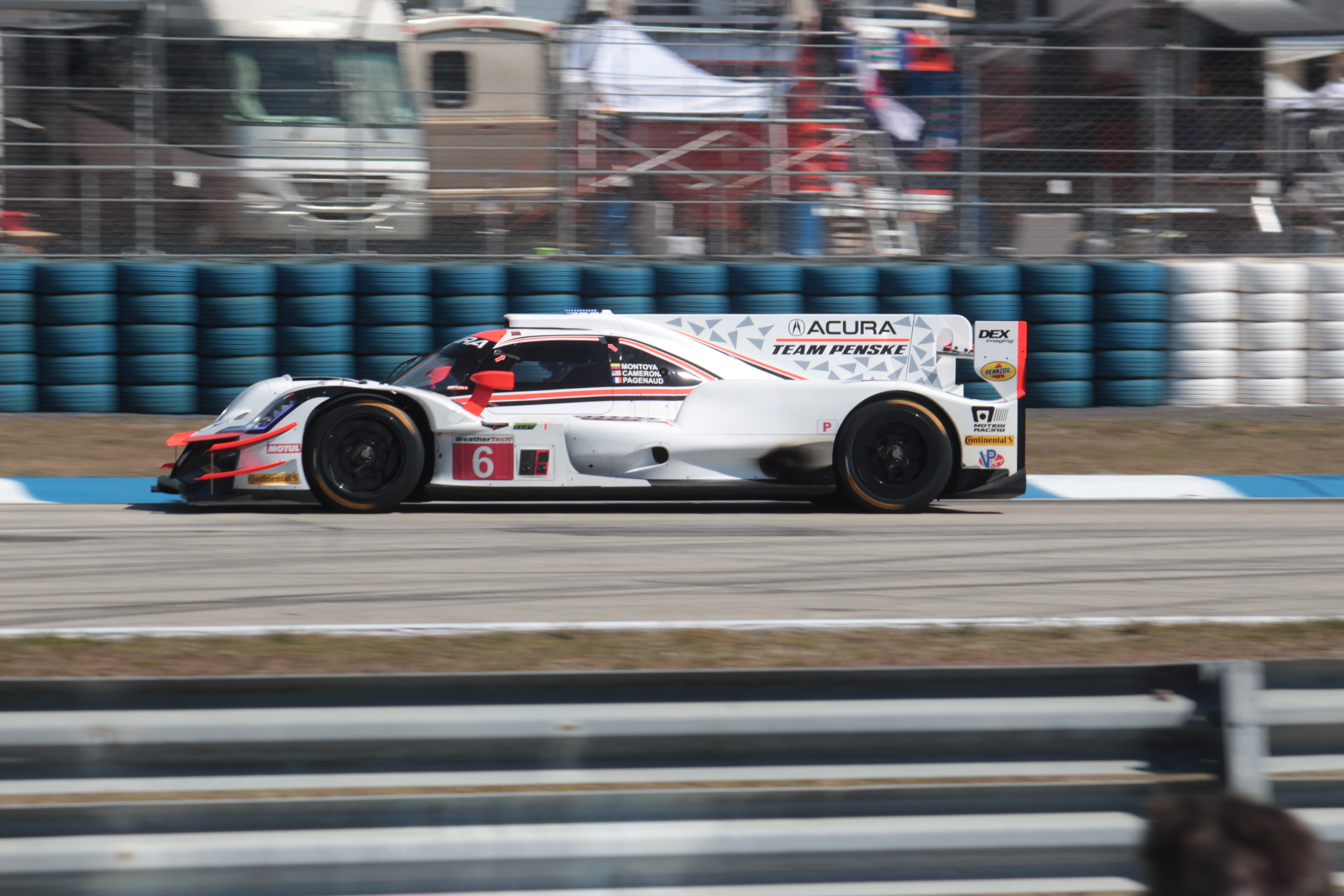
A 2018 DPi class competitor, the Acura ARX-05

A Daytona Prototype International (DPi) was a type of sports prototype racing car developed specifically for the International Motor Sports Association's WeatherTech SportsCar Championship, as their top class of car, acting as a direct replacement, and spiritual successor of the Daytona Prototypes. They are named after the main series event, the Rolex 24 at Daytona. The class made its racing debut at the 2017 24 Hours of Daytona.

The Daytona Prototype International was replaced by a joint IMSA-ACO class known as Le Mans Daytona h (LMDh) for the IMSA WeatherTech SportsCar Championship in 2023. Additionally, the LMDh class is also able to compete in the 24 Hours of Le Mans and the FIA World Endurance Championship in 2023.

== Developmental History ==
On 2 July 2015, IMSA announced the base regulations for its then unnamed new for 2017 Prototype class of the WeatherTech Sportscar Championship, which would succeed and replace the Gen 3 Daytona Prototypes, and Le Mans Prototype LMP2 class cars, which would become obsolete due to new global regulations on the LMP2 category. These base regulations would spell out the restricted areas, where custom manufacturer bodywork was disallowed, and the base prototype's parts would be needed to be used. The main restricted areas would be the rear wing, rear wing mount(s), and engine cover fin, in addition to the bottom the car, the splitter, floor, and diffuser. In addition, a control zone for the splitter was defined, to prevent splitter modifications behind the approximate front axle centerline. Restrictions at the front of the bodywork would also prohibit manufacturers from styling the outer regions of the nose, the area traditionally reserved for dive planes on a prototype. Additional restrictions also bar development in the region directly behind the front tyres of the car, while the diffuser section located aft of the rear tire was also prohibited to be developed. In opened areas for development, the creation of Wing Profiles was also prohibited.

Production-based engines would be utilised in the class, with the targeted engine weights and maximum engine displacements being released. Turbocharging would be available for 4 and 6-cylinder engines. Sonic air restrictors would be used for Naturally Aspirated engines, but turbocharged engines would operate without restrictors, with boost levels being RPM-based to balance the acceleration advantages of turbocharged engines compared to Naturally Aspirated engines.

On 1 October 2015, IMSA confirmed the release of engine and bodywork guidelines, and announced the name of the then unnamed class - Daytona Prototype International. It was also announced that DPi would be homologated for a minimum of four years, from 2017 through 2020, with the aim of allowing competitors to maximise their investments. To achieve performance parity in the top Prototype class of the championship, IMSA also announced a Balance of Performance (BoP) for both DPi and LMP2 specifications.

On 11 January 2016, IMSA Director of Racing Platforms, Mark Raffauf confirmed that each manufacturer would be required to commit to both an engine and bodywork package, and would be locked into an alliance with the selected chassis manufacturer, unlike the previous DP formula, which had allowed bodywork such as the Corvette DP outfitted on multiple chassis, and various chassis options for the same engine. Raffauf also stated that manufacturers would be allowed to make changes to the appearance of the bodywork or even debut new engines and/or branding over that period, subjected to approval and homologation by IMSA. Subsequently, Raffauf also confirmed that factory teams would be allowed, and that manufacturers would not be required to sell any chassis to customers.

On January 24, 2018, IMSA extended the homologation periods for LMP2, DPi and GTE-spec machinery in the WeatherTech SportsCar Championship by an additional year, due to the FIA World Endurance Championship's transition to a winter calendar, which would delay the homologation periods in the championship by roughly six months. As such, DPi and LMP2 cars, which had been originally confirmed for a four-year period through 2020, would now be eligible for competition, until at least the end of the 2021 season. In 2020 it was announced that DPi cars would be eligible until the end of 2022, due to the COVID pandemic and LMDh cars not being ready in time for the 2022 season.

== Competition at Le Mans ==
Initially, it was planned that the DPi cars, outfitted with the standard LMP2 bodywork, would be eligible for Le Mans in LMP2, via ACO's Balance of Performance process, to be controlled via the ECU. However, following changes to the regulations by IMSA, which saw the spec Cosworth ECU, as well as other data logging systems removed, the ACO President Pierre Fillon voiced his displeasure on the DPi platform, which eventually led to the cars becoming ineligible in LMP2 at Le Mans. The discussions eventually drifted to placing the cars in the LMP1 Privateer class, but did not bear fruit, with the cars being unable to compete at the race.

== Cars ==
Manufacturer	Image	Model	Chassis
Acura		Acura ARX-05	Oreca 07
Cadillac		Cadillac DPi-V.R	Dallara P217
Mazda		Mazda RT24-P	Riley-Multimatic MkXXX
Nissan		Ligier Nissan DPi	Ligier JS P217

== See also ==
- Le Mans Prototype
- LMDh
- Le Mans Hypercar
