= Mazda MZ-2.0T engine =

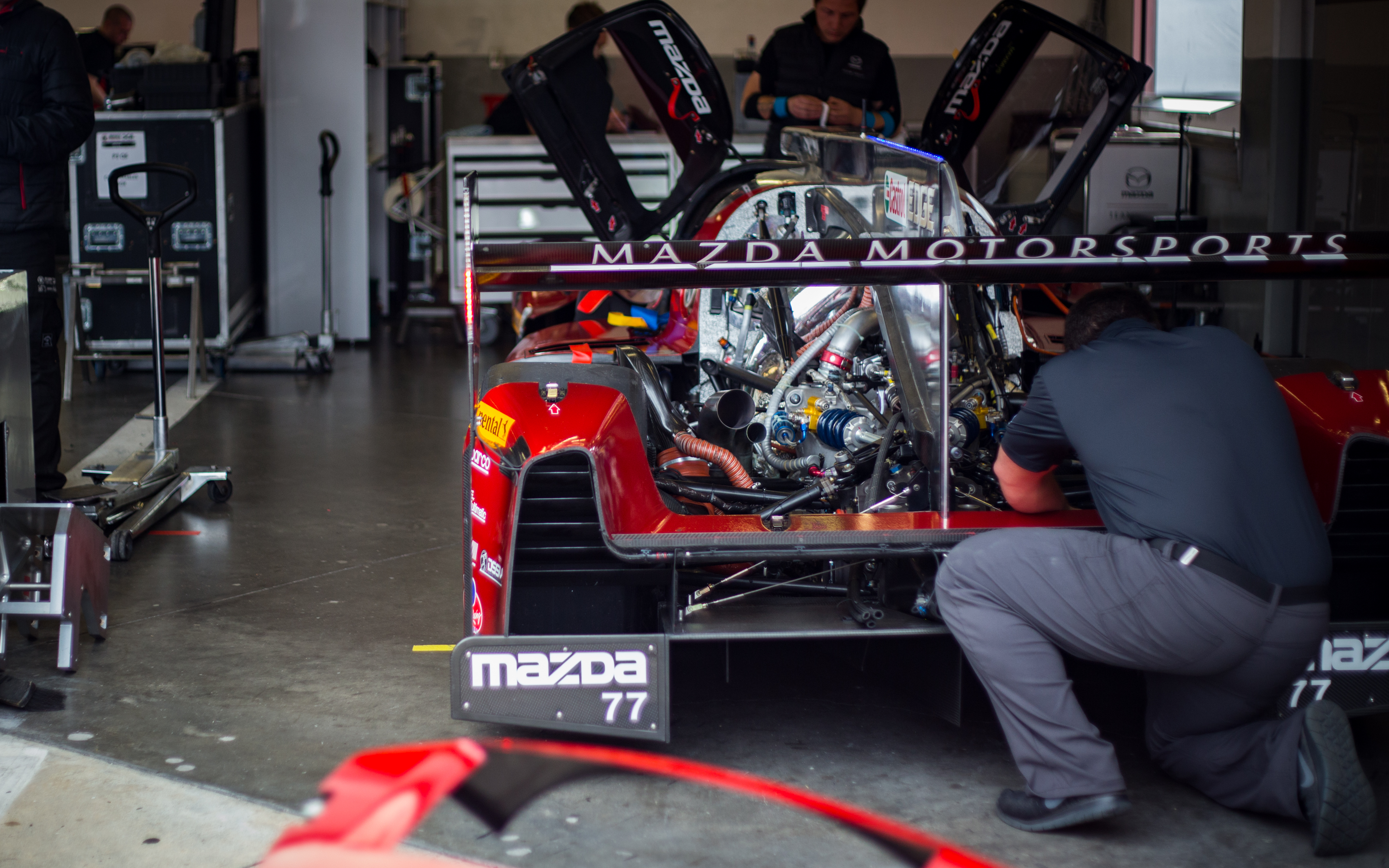
- MZ-2.0T in the back of the Mazda RT24-P

Overview
- Manufacturer: Advanced Engine Research
- Production: 2016–2021

Layout
- Configuration: I4, turbocharged
- Displacement: 2.0 L (1,998 cc)
- Cylinder bore: 90 mm (3.54 in)
- Piston stroke: 78.5 mm (3.09 in)
- Cylinder block material: Aluminium
- Cylinder head material: Aluminium
- Valvetrain: 16-valve (four-valves per cylinder), DOHC
- Valvetrain drive system: Chain
- Compression ratio: 13.5:1

RPM range
- Max. engine speed: 8,500–9,000 rpm

Combustion
- Turbocharger: Garrett TR30R turbo
- Fuel system: Gasoline direct injection
- Management: LIFE engine management ECU
- Fuel type: VP Racing Fuels MS100 RON unleaded 80% + E20 American Ethanol 20% (IMSA)
- Oil system: Dry sump

Output
- Power output: 570 hp (425 kW; 578 PS)–600 hp (447 kW; 608 PS)

The Mazda MZ-2.0T engine is a turbocharged, four-stroke, 2.0-liter, I4 racing engine, designed in partnership with Advanced Engine Research (AER) and Mazda for use in the Mazda Prototype and Mazda RT24-P race cars, from 2016 to 2021.

== Overview ==
The MZ-2.0T was developed by Mazda and Advanced Engine Research (AER) for the Mazda Prototype, after rule changes banned the previous Skyactiv-D diesel engine, and later used for the Mazda RT24-P. The engine is an iteration of the MZR-R, which has been used in sports car racing and is currently in use in all Indy NXT cars. The 2.0-liter, inline-4 engine features a single Garrett TR30R turbo outputting 570 horsepower (425 kilowatts; 578 metric horsepower) to 600 horsepower (447 kilowatts; 608 metric horsepower) with a redline of 8,500 to 9,000 rpm.

== Applications ==
- Mazda Prototype
- Mazda RT24-P
