= Krohn Racing =

Sports car racing team

(United States) Krohn Racing
- Founded: 2005
- Founder(s): Tracy Krohn
- Base: Houston, Texas, USA
- Team principal(s): Tracy Krohn
- Current series: European Le Mans Series; USCC
- Former series: FIA WEC; American Le Mans Series; Rolex Sports Car Series; Intercontinental Le Mans Cup
- Current drivers: (United States) Tracy Krohn (Sweden) Nic Jonsson (Brazil) Oswaldo Negri Jr. (Portugal) Joao Barbosa
- Drivers' Championships: 2006 Rolex Sports Car Series (Bergmeister)
- Website: krohnracing.com

Krohn Racing is a professional sports car racing team based in Houston, Texas. The team competes in the IMSA TUDOR United SportsCar Championship Prototype class, and has competed in the FIA World Endurance Championship, Intercontinental Le Mans Cup GTE-Amateur class; the American Le Mans Series GT2 class; and the Rolex Sports Car Series Daytona Prototype class.

The Krohn Racing team was formed by Tracy W. Krohn in late 2005. Their inaugural race was the Rolex 24 At Daytona in January 2006 with a single car, which finished in the Top Five. Krohn Racing won the 2006 Grand-Am Driver’s Championship and was second in the Team Championship. Krohn has continued to compete in Grand-Am every year since, collecting five victories, 15 podium finishes and four poles. Krohn Racing has two podiums (2nd & 3rd) at Le Mans in association with Risi Competizione, and a 3rd place at Sebring in ALMS. In 2011 Krohn Racing won the inaugural ILMC race at the 12 Hours of Sebring and the Petit Le Mans in the GTE-Am class. Krohn serves as owner and driver alongside co-driver Nic Jönsson of Sweden and Italian Michele Rugolo. The team finished second in the ILMC GTE-Am championship in 2011 and will compete in the entire 2012 FIA World Endurance Championship.

== History ==
=== 2006 ===
The team was formed in 2006 by businessman Tracy Krohn. The team's inaugural race was the Rolex 24 At Daytona in January 2006 with a single car, finishing 5th overall. During 2006, Krohn Racing collected three victories, six podium finishes, one pole position, and 14 top ten finishes, giving Jörg Bergmeister the Daytona Prototype Drivers' Championship. They also finished second in the Daytona Prototype Team Championship. Drivers for 2006 were Krohn, Nic Jönsson, Colin Braun, and Bergmeister. Additionally, Krohn combined with Petersen/White Lightning Racing to run a Porsche 911 GT3-RSR at the 24 Hours of Le Mans.

=== 2007 ===
In 2007, Krohn Racing fielded two Riley-Pontiacs and finished fourth in the Grand-Am Prototype Team Championship after collecting six podiums and 15 top ten finishes, as well as two pole positions. Drivers for the team included Colin Braun and past Grand-Am champion Max Papis, along with Krohn and Jönsson. Additionally, Krohn partnered with Houston-based Risi Competizione in a Ferrari F430 GT for four American Le Mans Series races and the 2007 24 Hours of Le Mans, where they finished second in the GT2 class.

=== 2008 ===
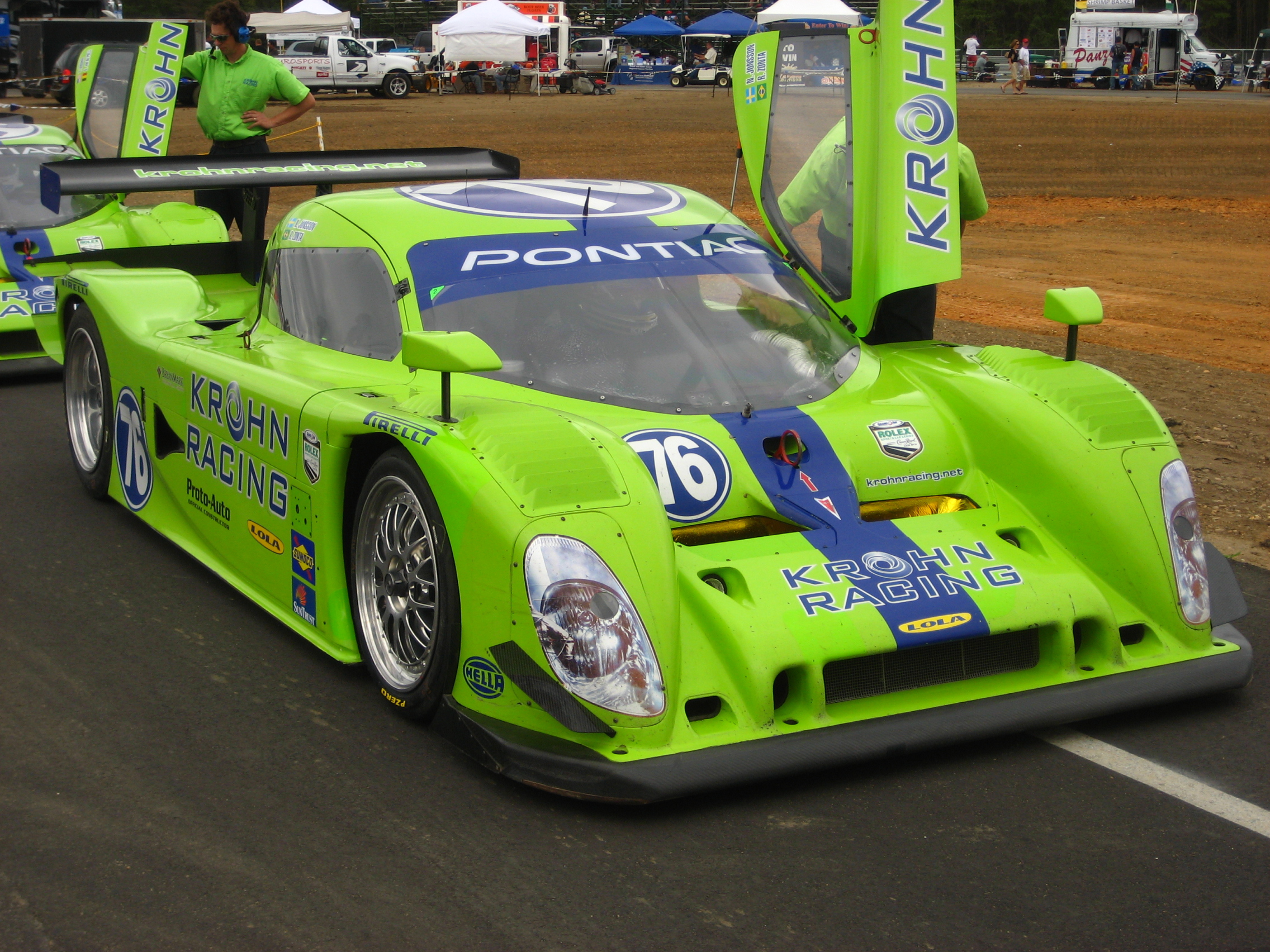
The Proto-Auto Lola at the 2008 Grand-Am round at New Jersey Motorsports Park

In March 2007 Krohn Racing and Lola Cars purchased a chassis design and DP constructors license from Multimatic Motorsports. The company they created, Proto-Auto LLC, built a new Daytona Prototype chassis, badged with a Lola nameplate, for the 2008 Grand-Am season. Krohn Racing competed in 2008 with two of the new cars with Pontiac engines. Drivers in 2008 were team owner/driver Tracy Krohn and Belgian Eric van de Poele in the No. 75 entry and Nic Jönsson and former Formula One driver Ricardo Zonta in the No. 76 entry.

=== 2009 ===
In 2009, Krohn Racing competed in two Roush-Yates Ford-powered Proto-Auto Lolas for the Rolex 24 At Daytona with Krohn, van de Poele and Oliver Gavin in the No. 75 entry; and Nic Jönsson, Ricardo Zonta and Darren Turner in the No. 76. Both cars failed to finish due to a faulty engine supplier component. Jönsson and Zonta competed in an additional eight races and captured two victories (at New Jersey Motorsports Park and Watkins Glen International) and a podium at Mid-Ohio. Krohn only competed in one additional race due to scheduling conflicts with his daily business. He and van de Poele raced at the Daytona sprint race in July, finishing 9th. Krohn, Jönsson and van de Poele finished third in the Risi-Krohn Ferrari 430 GT at the 24 Hours of Le Mans and sixth at the 12 Hours of Sebring.

=== 2010 ===
In 2010 Krohn Racing ran a single entry, the No. 75 Proto-Auto Lola-Ford, with Krohn and Jönsson paired for a 12-race Grand-Am Rolex Series schedule. They collected five top 10 finishes including a fourth place at the Rolex 24 At Daytona with Ricardo Zonta and Colin Braun joining the regular duo. Jönsson captured his first Grand-Am Rolex pole position at Lime Rock Park in May. Krohn won the "Jim Trueman Award" for top Pro-Am driver of the race at the Rolex 24 and Montreal 200. Krohn, Jönsson, and van de Poele also competed in two American Le Mans Series races (7th in class at the 12 Hours of Sebring and 9th in class at Laguna Seca), as well as a DNF at the 24 Hours of Le Mans, with the Risi-Krohn Ferrari 430 GT.

=== 2011 ===
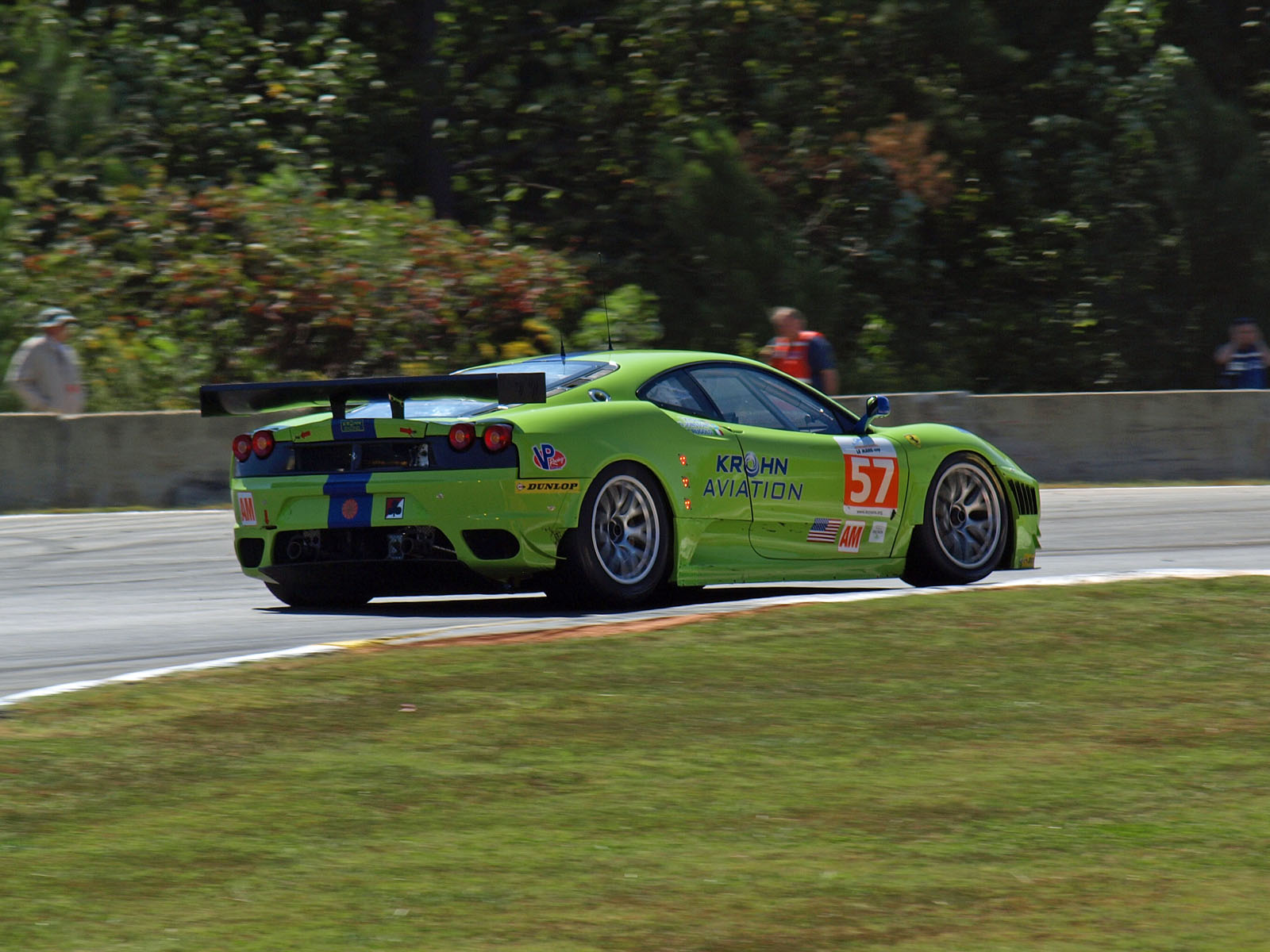
Krohn's Ferrari F430 at the 2011 Petit Le Mans

For 2011, Krohn Racing drivers Tracy Krohn, Nic Jönsson, Ricardo Zonta, and Nicolas Minassian and finished sixth overall in the Rolex 24 At Daytona in the No. 76 Krohn Racing Proto-Auto Lola-Ford. Additionally, Krohn Racing competed in the 2011 Intercontinental Le Mans Cup, winning the GT-Am class at Sebring and Petit Le Mans.

=== 2012 ===
In 2012, Krohn Racing drivers Tracy Krohn, Nic Jönsson, Ricardo Zonta and Colin Braun finished 19th overall in the 2012 24 Hours of Daytona in the No. 75 Proto-Auto Lola-Ford. On February 2, 2012, the team was confirmed an entry for the FIA World Endurance Championship in the GTE-Am category with a Ferrari F458 Italia. Tracy Krohn, Nic Jönsson and Michele Rugolo are listed as drivers.

=== 2013 ===
Grand -Am Krohn Racing competes in 2013 FIA World Endurance Championship in the GTE-Am class. Fifth place finish at the 6 Hours of São Paulo, sixth-place finish in GTE-Am class at the 6 Hours of Silverstone, seventh place at the 6 Hours of Spa and DNF at the 24 Hours of Le Mans. Krohn Racing also competed at the Circuit of the Americas Grand-Am with the No. 76 Krohn Racing DP Ford with team owner/driver Tracy W. Krohn and Nic Jönsson, finishing a respectable sixth in a two-year-old DP car. Tracy, Nic, Emanuel Collard and Romain Dumas competed in a Porsche GT at the Rolex 24 at Daytona but had a DNF due to mechanical issues.

FIA World Endurance Championship The No. 57 Ferrari F458 will compete in the entire 2013 WEC season with Krohn, Jönsson and Maurizio Mediani. Sixth place finish at the 6 Hours of Silverstone and seventh place at the 6 Hours of Spa.

=== 2014 ===
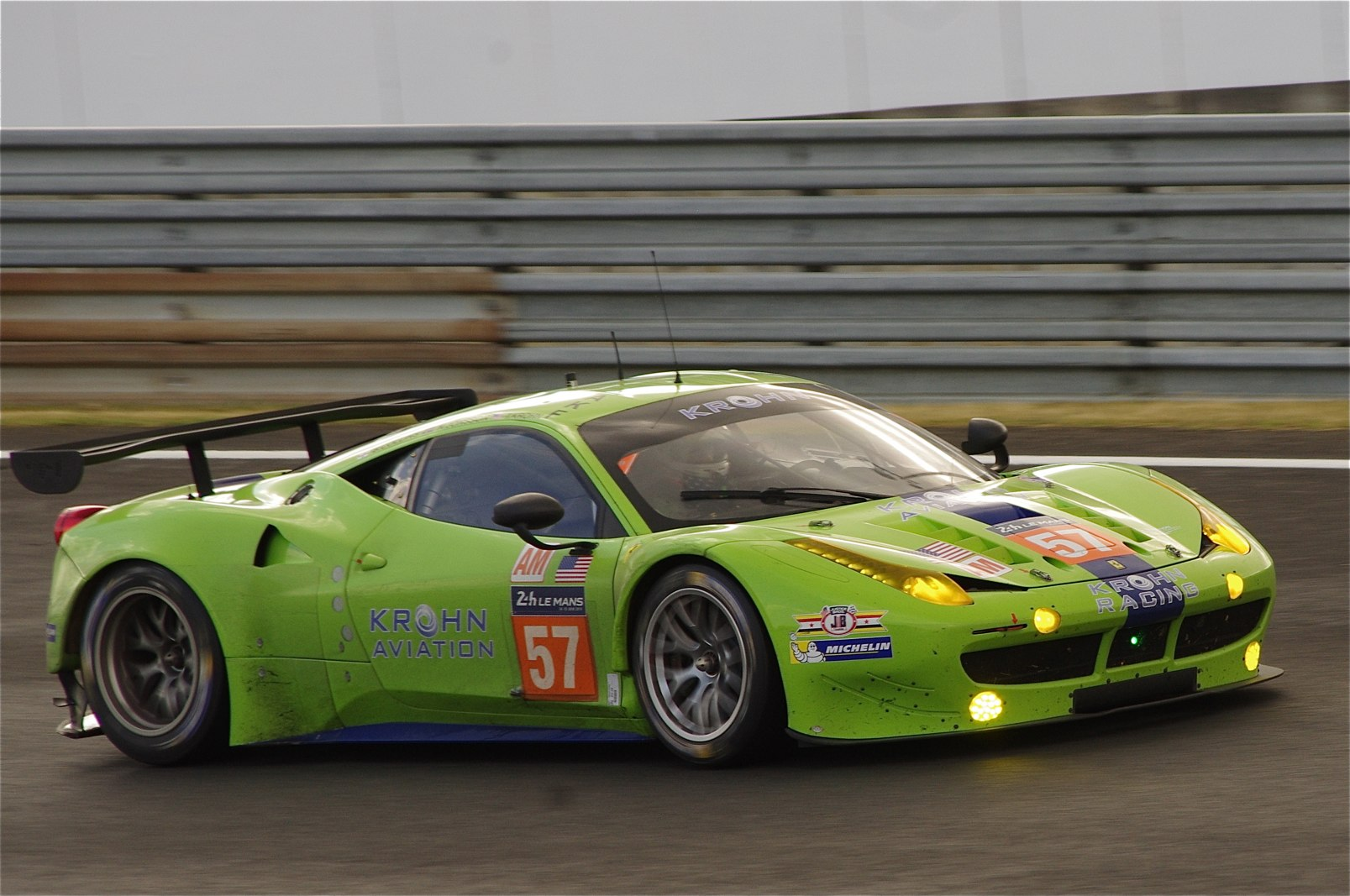
The Krohn Racing Ferrari 458 Italia GT2 at 24 Hours of Le Mans

IMSA TUDOR United SportsCar Championship

Krohn Racing competed in a partial IMSA TUDOR schedule with full-time drivers Tracy Krohn and Nic Jönsson, including the four North American Endurance Challenge events within the IMSA schedule, and also the 24 Hours of Le Mans and the 6 Hours of COTA with the WEC.

The team finished seventh at the Rolex 24 Hours of Daytona, fourth at the Mobil 1 12 Hours of Sebring, eleventh at the Continental Tire Sports Car Festival at Mazda Raceway Laguna Seca and eleventh at the Sahlen’s Six Hours of the Glen at Watkins Glen, and ninth at Petit Le Mans, all in the GTE-LM class. Andrea Bertolini and Peter Dumbreck co-drove at the 24 Hours at Daytona, and Bertolini joined Krohn and Jönsson for the 12 Hours of Sebring and Petit Le Mans.

ACO/FIA World Endurance Championship

Krohn Racing finished 10th in the 24 Hours of Le Mans race in France with ex-Stig Ben Collins co-driving with Tracy Krohn and Nic Jonsson in the GTE-Am class. Collins joined the team again at COTA for a sixth-place finish in GTE-Am of the FIA WEC Six Hours of COTA.

=== 2015 ===
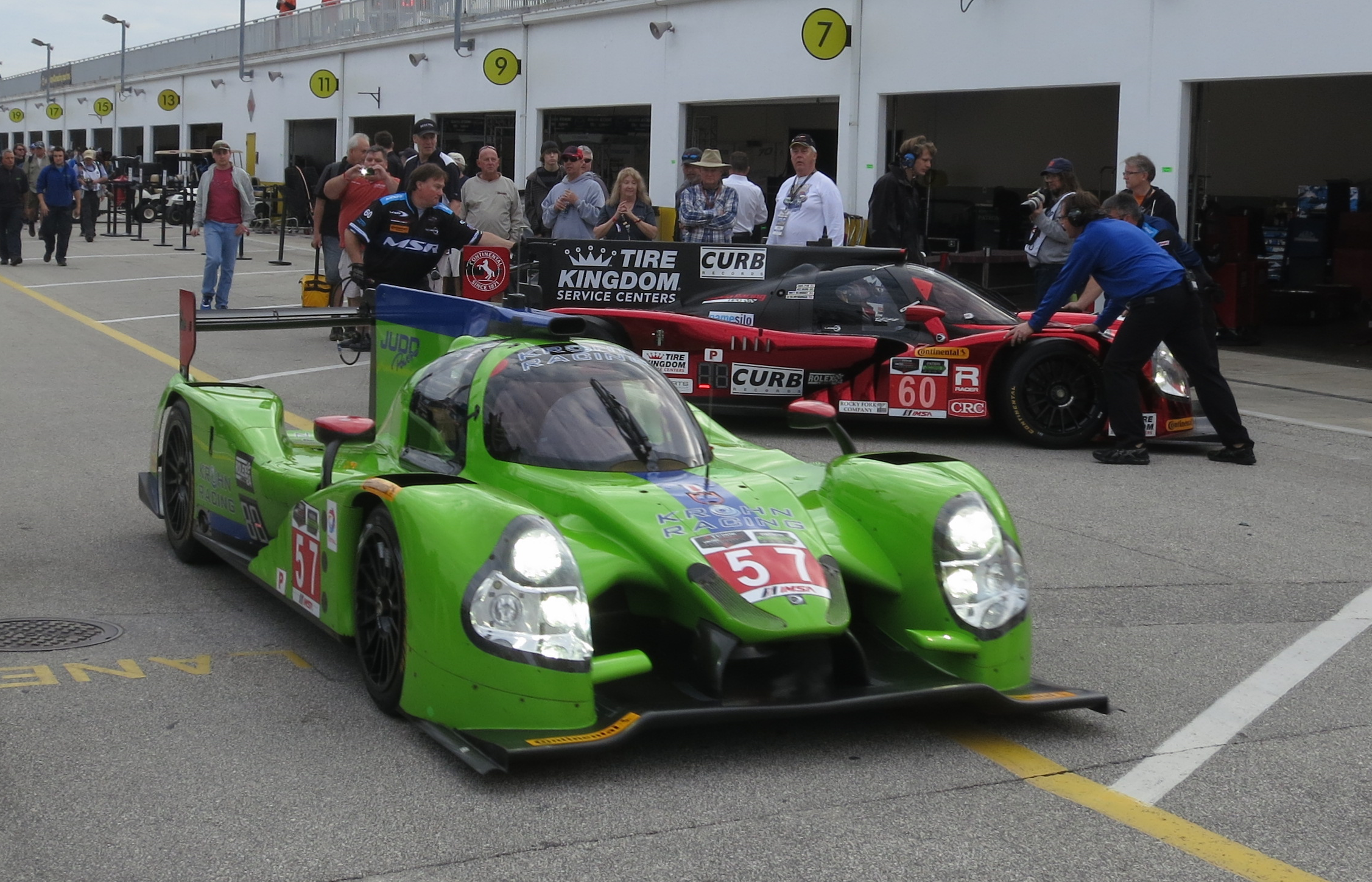
The Krohn Racing Ligier JS P2 at Rolex 24 Hours of Daytona

Krohn Racing competes for the first time in the Ligier JS P2 powered by Judd engine and has chosen to race in selected IMSA races (P class), in the full season of European Le mans Series (LMP2 class) and was accepted to run in the 24 Hours of Le Mans (LMP2 class).

IMSA TUDOR United SportsCar Championship - Krohn Racing is competing in a partial IMSA TUDOR schedule with full-time drivers Tracy Krohn and Nic Jonsson, including several races of the North American Endurance Challenge events—The No. 57 Ligier JS P2 Judd competed in P class at Rolex 24 At Daytona (DNF) with drivers Tracy Krohn, Nic Jonsson, Alex Brundle, and Olivier Pla and the 12 Hours of Sebring (Started 1st, finished 8th) with drivers Krohn, Jonsson and Pla.

FIA European Le Mans Series (ELMS) - Krohn Racing was awarded an LMP2 entry for the 2015 ELMS season. IMSA driver Oswaldo (Ozz) Negri, Jr. is the third co-driver for four of the five ELMS events with Krohn and Jonsson. Julien Canal joined Krohn and Jonsson for the 4 Hours of Red Bull Ring, Austria, July 11–12 where they finished 5th. The No. 40 Ligier JS P2 Judd finished 4th at the 4 Hours of Silverstone, April 11 and 5th at Imola, Italy, May 17, xx at Paul Ricard, France, September 5–6; and xx at Estoril, Portugal, October 17–18.

ACO 24 Hours of Le Mans - Krohn Racing, with the new Ligier-Judd, was awarded an LMP2 entry for the 83rd running of the 24 Hours of Le Mans, June 13–14. The team started 17th and finished 12th with drivers Krohn, Jonsson and João Barbosa.

(Update as of Sept. 3, 2015)

== Racing record ==
=== 24 Hours of Le Mans results ===
Year	Entrant	No	Car	Drivers	Class	Laps	Pos.	Class Pos.
2006	(United States) White Lightning Racing (United States) Krohn Racing	90	Porsche 911 GT3-RSR	(Germany) Jörg Bergmeister (Sweden) Niclas Jönsson (United States) Tracy Krohn	LMGT2	148	DNF	DNF
2007	(United States) Risi Competizione (United States) Krohn Racing	99	Ferrari F430 GT2	(United States) Colin Braun (Sweden) Niclas Jönsson (United States) Tracy Krohn	LMGT2	314	19th	2nd
2008	(United States) Risi Competizione (United States) Krohn Racing	83	Ferrari F430 GT2	(Sweden) Niclas Jönsson (United States) Tracy Krohn (Belgium) Eric van de Poele	LMGT2	12	DNF	DNF
2009	(United States) Risi Competizione (United States) Krohn Racing	83	Ferrari F430 GT2	(Sweden) Niclas Jönsson (United States) Tracy Krohn (Belgium) Eric van de Poele	LMGT2	323	22nd	3rd
2010	(United States) Risi Competizione (United States) Krohn Racing	83	Ferrari F430 GT2	(Sweden) Niclas Jönsson (United States) Tracy Krohn (Belgium) Eric van de Poele	LMGT2	197	DNF	DNF
2011	(United States) Krohn Racing	57	Ferrari F430 GTE	(Sweden) Niclas Jönsson (United States) Tracy Krohn (Italy) Michele Rugolo	LMGTE Am	123	DNF	DNF
2012	(United States) Krohn Racing	57	Ferrari 458 Italia GT2	(Sweden) Niclas Jönsson (United States) Tracy Krohn (Italy) Michele Rugolo	LMGTE Am	323	25th	3rd
2013	(United States) Krohn Racing	57	Ferrari 458 Italia GT2	(Sweden) Niclas Jönsson (United States) Tracy Krohn (Italy) Maurizio Mediani	LMGTE Am	111	DNF	DNF
2014	(United States) Krohn Racing	57	Ferrari 458 Italia GT2	(United Kingdom) Ben Collins (Sweden) Niclas Jönsson (United States) Tracy Krohn	LMGTE Am	324	30th	10th
2015	(United States) Krohn Racing	40	Ligier JS P2-Judd	(Portugal) João Barbosa (Sweden) Niclas Jönsson (United States) Tracy Krohn	LMP2	323	32nd	12th
2016	(United States) Krohn Racing	40	Ligier JS P2-Nissan	(Portugal) João Barbosa (Sweden) Niclas Jönsson (United States) Tracy Krohn	LMP2	338	22nd	13th
2017	(Hong Kong) DH Racing	83	Ferrari 488 GTE	(Italy) Andrea Bertolini (Sweden) Niclas Jönsson (United States) Tracy Krohn	LMGTE Am	320	42nd	13th
2018	(Philippines) Eurasia Motorsport	44	Ligier JS P217-Gibson	(Italy) Andrea Bertolini (Sweden) Niclas Jönsson (United States) Tracy Krohn	LMP2	334	NC	NC
2019	(Germany) Dempsey-Proton Racing	99	Porsche 911 RSR	(Sweden) Niclas Jönsson (United States) Tracy Krohn (United States) Patrick Long	LMGTE Am	0	WD	WD
