= 2007 24 Hours of Le Mans =

75th 24 Hours of Le Mans endurance race

Previous: 2006	Next: 2008
Index: Races | Winners

Circuit de la Sarthe track

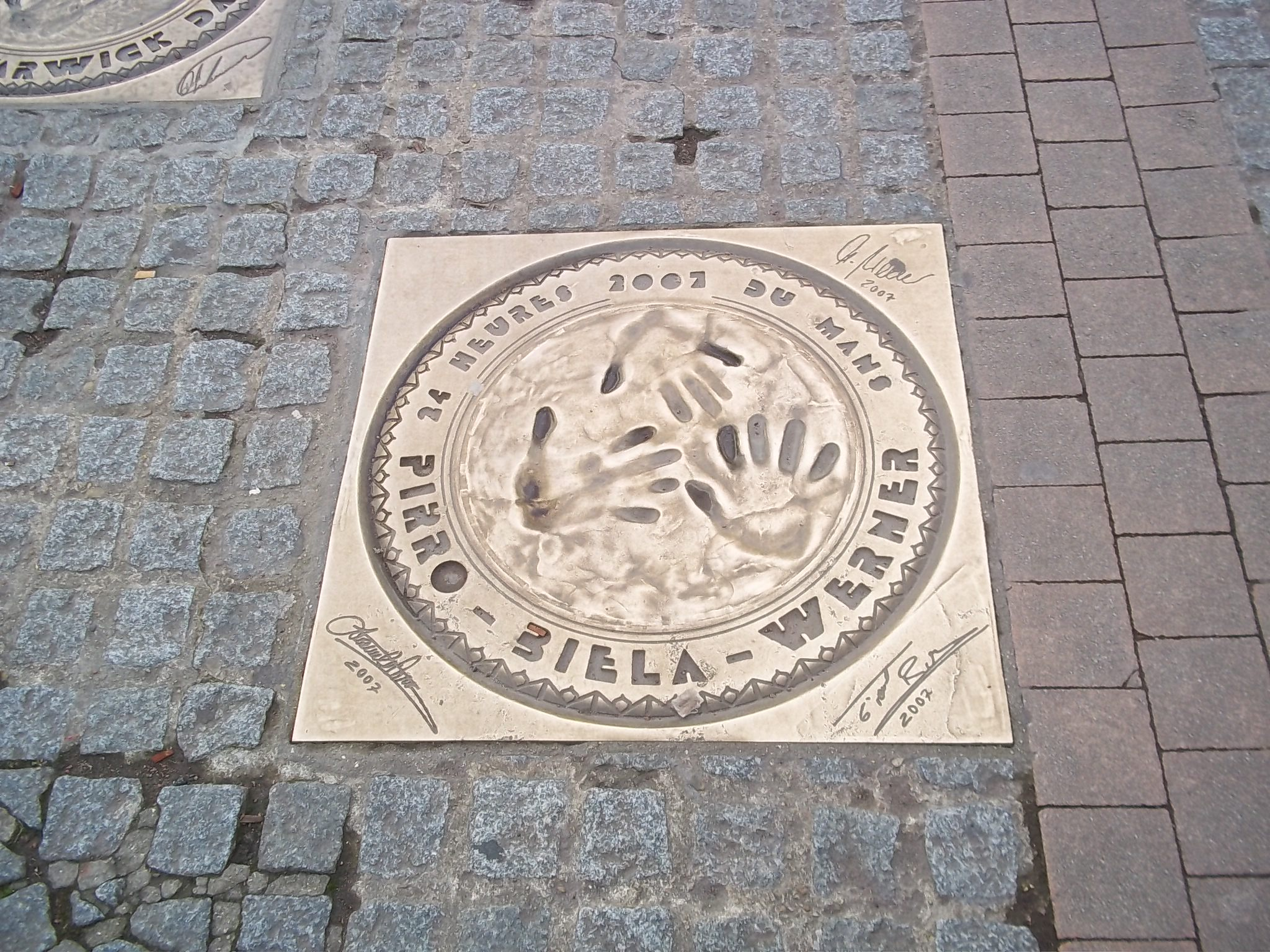
Handprint's winners 2007 edition in the Walk of fame of Le Mans

The 75th 24 Hours of Le Mans (French: 75^{e} 24 Heures du Mans) was a 24-hour automobile endurance race for Le Mans Prototype and Grand Touring cars, which took place at the Circuit de la Sarthe, near Le Mans, France, from 16 to 17 June 2007. It was the 75th edition of the event, as organised by the automotive group, the Automobile Club de l'Ouest (ACO) since 1923. Unlike other events, it was not a part of any endurance motor racing championship. A test day was held two weeks prior to the race on 3 June. The event was attended by 250,952 spectators.

The LMP1 class saw the first competition between the new diesel engined Peugeot 908 HDi FAP prototype and the diesel Audi R10 TDI, the 2006 Le Mans winner; the Audi once again achieved an overall victory. There was heavy attrition in the LMP2 class, in which only two competitors finished the race. In the GT1 class, Aston Martin achieved its first win over the Corvette since returning to the event in 2005. The GT2 class was a battle between Ferrari and Porsche, won by Porsche.

== Background ==
The dates for the 2007 24 Hours of Le Mans were confirmed by the Automobile Club de l'Ouest (ACO) in September 2006. It was the 75th edition of the race and occurred at the 13.629 km (8.469 mi) Circuit de la Sarthe road racing track close to Le Mans, France, from 16 to 17 June 2007. The race was first held in 1923 after the automotive journalist Charles Faroux, the Automobile Club de l'Ouest (ACO) general secretary Georges Durand and the industrialist Emile Coquile agreed to hold a test of vehicle reliability and durability. It is considered the world's most prestigious sports car race and is part of the Triple Crown of Motorsport.

== Track changes ==
Between the 2006 and 2007 races, the Circuit de la Sarthe was upgraded, most obviously by the reprofiling of the Tertre Rouge corner. The new corner was moved inward, to create a long flowing curve instead of the single point apex it had been previously, shortening the lap distance by 21 meters to a revised 13.629 km.

Nine new garages were built at the end of the pit lane, replacing the four temporary garages that had been built a few years earlier. The additional garages allowed the ACO to increase the number of entries it could grant from 50 to 55. The paddock behind the garages was also re-organized with more facilities added for spectators, including more shops, new landscaping, and the Audi Tower monument.

The public roads from the Indianapolis corner to the Porsche Curves were re-surfaced. Run-off areas at the Dunlop Chicane, Tertre Rouge, Indianapolis, and Ford Chicanes were also partially asphalted in order to avoid gravel being brought back onto the circuit by cars which had gone off course. This also increased safety by allowing the cars to slow themselves more efficiently using their brakes and tyres on tarmac.

== Regulation changes ==
Rule changes were announced by the ACO for all Le Mans-based series such as the American Le Mans Series, the Le Mans Series, and Japan Le Mans Challenge effective in 2007 for all four classes in October 2006 following close coordination with engineers, fuel companies and manufacturers. Diesel engined LMP1 cars had their fuel tank capacity decreased from 90 L (20 imp gal; 24 US gal) to 81 L (18 imp gal; 21 US gal) and with petrol engines retained their 90 L (20 imp gal; 24 US gal) tanks. LMP2, GT1, and GT2 class vehicles had to be fitted with 5 per cent smaller air restrictors than they had run in 2006, in order to decrease power. Each of the GT1 and GT2 classes were allowed to run ethanol and other alternative fuels if approved by the ACO.

The ACO also imposed Le Mans specific rule changes. All entries had to run Shell fuel in either diesel or petrol form. The temperature inside closed-cockpit cars was not to exceed 32 °C (90 °F) in cars with air conditioning or 10 °C (50 °F) above the ambient air temperature in cars without. The ACO would monitor cockpit temperature, and stop any car in which those limits were exceeded. Noise level regulation was revised: the noise emitted from the car had to be less than 113 dB with measurement taken at 15 m (49 ft) from the edge of the track. Newer but not older LMP900 and LMP675 class prototypes were allowed to be entered for the event.

It was also decided to begin the event at 3:00 pm local time, one hour earlier than the normal 4:00 pm, to provide French spectators more time to vote in the 17 June French legislative election.

== Entries ==
The ACO's Selection Committee received 76 race entry applications by the 24 January deadline. It reviewed every application and granted 55 invitations to the 24 Hours of Le Mans with entries divided between the LMP1, LMP2, LMGT1 and LMGT2 categories.

=== Automatic invitations ===
Automatic entries were earned by teams which won their category in the 2006 24 Hours of Le Mans. Teams which won Le Mans-based series and events such as the 2006 Petit Le Mans, the 2006 Le Mans Series and the 2006 American Le Mans Series were also invited. Some second-place finishers were also granted automatic entries in certain series as well as the third-place LMGT1 finisher of the 2006 Petit Le Mans. Additionally, entries were also granted to the winners and runners-up of the LMGT1 and LMGT2 categories of the 2006 FIA GT Championship under an agreement with the ACO president Claude Plassart, and Stéphane Ratel, the president of the FIA GT Championship organising body, the Stephane Ratel Organisation. As entries were pre-selected to teams, they were restricted to a maximum of two cars and were not allowed to change their vehicles from the previous year to the next. Entries were permitted to change category provided that they did not change the make of car and the ACO granted official permission for the switch.

On 19 January 2007, the ACO announced that 24 of the 28 teams had accepted their automatic entries before the deadline. Penske Racing turned down both of its invitations, and Ray Mallock Ltd. rejected its second entry due to a lack of funding. Vitaphone Racing Team rejected its invitation because its Maserati MC12 did not comply with the ACO's GT1 rules, although the team later attempted to gain entry in another class through application.

==== List of automatic entries ====
Automatic entries for the 2007 24 Hours of Le Mans
Reason Entered	LMP1	LMP2	GT1	GT2
1st in the 24 Hours of Le Mans	(Germany) Audi Sport Team Joest	(United Kingdom) RML	(United States) Corvette Racing	(United Kingdom) Team LNT
2nd in the 24 Hours of Le Mans	(France) Pescarolo Sport	(United States) Binnie Motorsports	(United Kingdom) Aston Martin Racing	(Germany) Seikel Motorsport
1st in the 2006 Le Mans Series	(France) Pescarolo Sport	(France) Barazi-Epsilon	(France) Aston Martin Racing Larbre	(Italy) Autorlando Sport
2nd in the 2006 Le Mans Series	(United Kingdom) Creation Autosportif	(United Kingdom) RML^{1}	(Czech Republic) Convers MenX Team	(United Kingdom) Team LNT
1st in the 2006 Petit Le Mans	(United States) Audi Sport North America	(United States) Penske Racing^{1}		
2nd in the 2006 Petit Le Mans				(United States) Risi Competizione^{4}
3rd in the 2006 Petit Le Mans			(United States) Corvette Racing^{2}	
1st in the 2006 American Le Mans Series	(United States) Audi Sport North America	(United States) Penske Racing^{1}		(United States) Risi Competizione
2nd in the 2006 American Le Mans Series			(United Kingdom) Aston Martin Racing^{3}	
1st in the 2006 FIA GT Championship			(Germany) Vitaphone Racing Team^{1}	(Italy) AF Corse
2nd in the 2006 FIA GT Championship			(Italy) Aston Martin Racing BMS	(United Kingdom) Scuderia Ecosse
Sources:

1. – Team declined their automatic invitations.
2. – Due to IMSA allowing Aston Martin to run Petit Le Mans below the ACO's minimum weight, their first and second place finishes were not allowed, and automatic entry given to Corvette Racing.
3. – Corvette Racing had already won two automatic entries, thus the entry was given to Aston Martin.
4. – Petersen/White Lightning was allowed to participate in Petit Le Mans on a technical waiver. Thus their win was not allowed by the ACO, and automatic entry was given to Risi Competizione.

=== Official entry list ===
The ACO published the official entry list on 27 February 2007, which included the full 55 entries and 8 reserves, the largest field since the 1989 edition. Although drivers were not listed, Tom Kristensen's injury in the opening round of the 2007 Deutsche Tourenwagen Masters season made his participation in the race questionable. As the driver with the most wins at Le Mans, he was intended to be part of Audi's factory team. Fellow Audi DTM driver Mattias Ekström was nominated as his possible replacement by Audi. However, on 11 June 2007 Kristensen was cleared by doctors to race, leaving Ekström's services unneeded.

==== Reserve entries ====
A total of eight reserve entries were listed by the ACO in its initial published list. Reserves were added to the entry list when a competitor already on the list withdrew. The ACO determined the order in which reserve entries were considered for addition to the entry list.

Two cars officially withdrew from the entry list in April, with their places taken by the following reserve entries. Rollcentre Racing withdrew its LMP2 Radical-Judd entry due to the car being purchased by Embassy Racing on 3 April. The PSI Experience Chevrolet Corvette C6.R was promoted to the race entry as a result. Eight days later, Petersen/White Lightning withdrew its GT2 Ferrari entry had as a consequence of financial strain to the team, leaving it to concentrate solely on the American Le Mans Series. The GPC Sport Ferrari F430 GT2 took its place on the entry list.

JMB Racing also withdrew its entry from the reserve list due to its drivers reaching an agreement with AF Corse to run in its entry instead.

== Test session ==
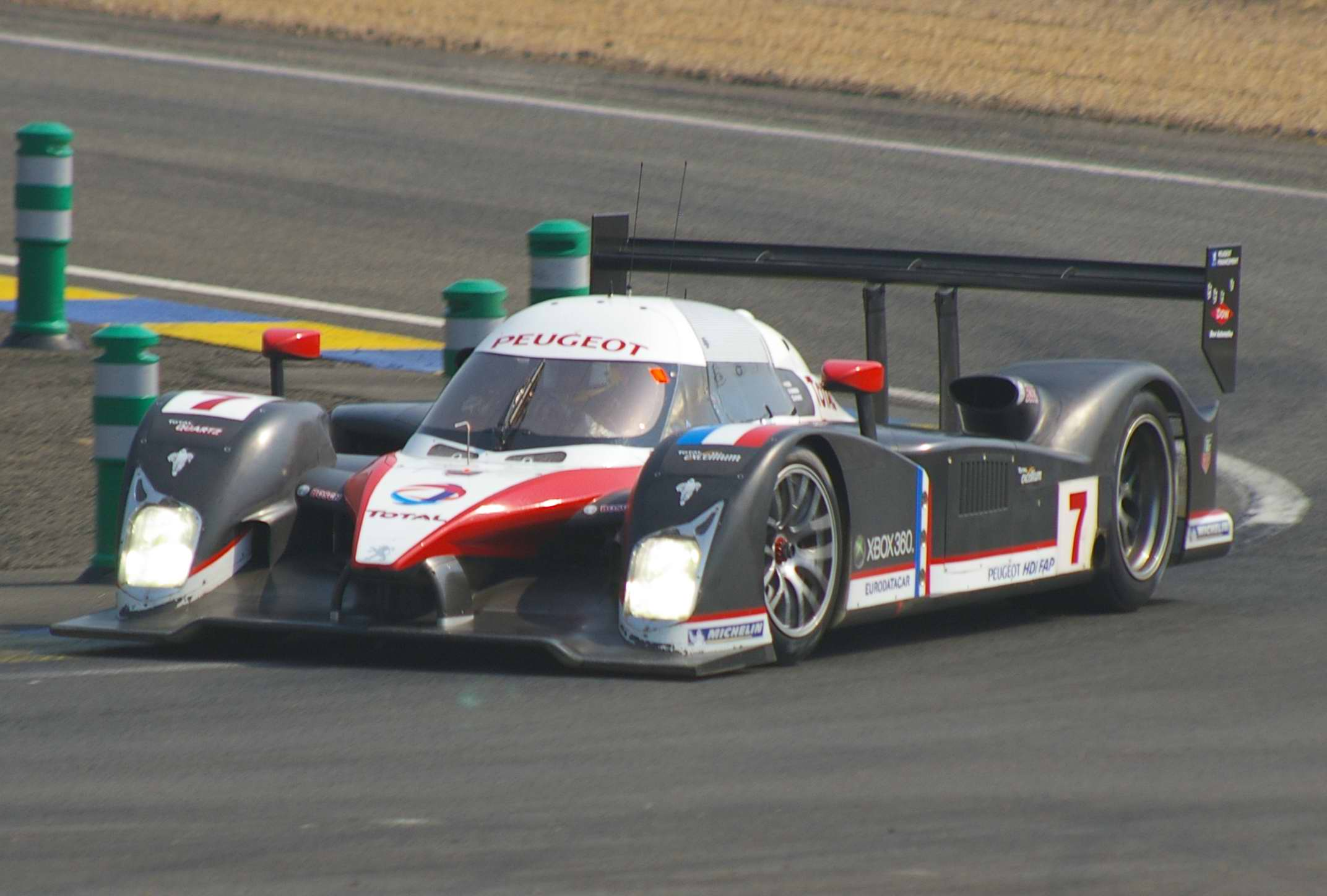
Jacques Villeneuve driving the new Peugeot 908 HDi FAP during the test session.

The official test session for Le Mans was held on 3 June, and was the only practice session that was not part of qualifying timing. A total of eight hours of track time was allowed for teams to find their set-ups and for rookie drivers to get in their required ten laps to learn the circuit. Peugeot set the day's pace with a 3:26.707 from Sébastien Bourdais in the No. 8 Peugeot 908 HDi FAP with 22 minutes of testing to go. He was one-and-a-half seconds faster than the No. 1 Audi R10 TDI of Frank Biela who was the highest-placed Audi driver in second. Biela was followed by Allan McNish in the sister No. 2 Audi in third who was ahead of Jean-Christophe Boullion's fourth-placed No. 16 Pescarolo 01 car. Jacques Villeneuve put the No. 7 Peugeot in fifth to be the fastest rookie driver over the course of the two sessions.

Michael Vergers' No. 32 Barazi Epsilon car and his teammate Adrián Fernández in the No. 33 entry set identical lap times of 3:39.016 to lead the LMP2 category. The third-fastest class time was set by Warren Hughes' No. 40 Quifel ASM Team Racing for Portugal Lola car that had a misfire. In GT1, the No. 63 Corvette driven by Jan Magnussen recorded the fastest time of 3:49.207, followed by the No. 007 Aston Martin of Tomáš Enge and the second factory No. 64 Corvette. Porsche and its new 997s set the first three fastest-laps in the GT2 class. IMSA Performance Matmut's Patrick Long led with a 4:01.598 lap, while Autorlando's Allan Simonsen and Johannes van Overbeek of the Flying Lizard team followed behind in second and third positions. The Risi Competizione entry was the fastest Ferrari in fourth place.

Although there were various small incidents, three major accidents led to a red flag for the session. The No. 13 Courage Compétition entry, driven by Guillaume Moreau, went off at the Porsche Curves during the second hour. The car could not return to the test session due a bent chassis caused by the heavy impact. The second red flag involved the No. 24 Noël del Bello entry going off the track at the same location in the hands of Vitaly Petrov, becoming briefly airborne after contact with the concrete wall. In the final incident, almost in the last hour of the session, the No. 10 Arena Motorsports Zytek also went off at the Porsche Curves, and briefly caught fire.

The damage to the Arena Zytek led to the car being withdrawn during scrutineering a week and a half later, just before the actual race. The team decided that it was not able to repair the damage in time for the car to pass scrutineering.

== Qualifying ==
Qualifying was held on 13–14 June, with two two-hour sessions each night; one run at dusk, the other in darkness. New drivers were again required to run a set number of laps to learn the circuit and be allowed to race: three in daylight and three at night. The best overall time from all four sessions determined the starting grid.

=== Wednesday ===
The first qualifying session began under the threat of rain, so most of the teams tried to set a good lap time before the conditions deteriorated. The Audis and Peugeots swapped the overall pole position several times, and at the end of the session the No. 1 Audi was fastest overall with a time of 3.28.301. The No. 33 Barazi-Epsilon Zytek led LMP2, after an earlier misfiring problem had been repaired. Oreca's Saleens were the fastest two GT1 cars, while Ferrari and Porsche were close to one another in GT2. The session was red flagged about halfway through because of an accident in which the No. 53 JLOC Lamborghini Murciélago, driven by Marco Apicella, hit the wall at the first Mulsanne chicane. The No. 25 Ray Mallock Ltd. Lola and No. 81 LNT Panoz were the only cars not to set a lap time before the session briefly returned to green as rain began. The ACO extended the session by 15 minutes to compensate for the earlier red flag.

The second session started several minutes late due to the damp conditions from the earlier rain. A red flag briefly came out for the No. 5 Swiss Spirit Lola a few minutes after the session began due to the car being stopped at the side of the track. Although the track was drying, it was not until the last half hour that teams were able to improve on their first session times. The No. 2 Audi and No. 8 Peugeot swapped the pole position multiple times before the session ended with the No. 8 Peugeot claiming the top position on the final lap of the session with a time of 3:26.344. In GT1 the No. 008 Larbre Aston Martin took the class lead on the final lap with a 3:50.761. The LMP2 and GT2 classes saw very little improvement; the class leading teams remained the same.

It was later announced by the ACO that JLOC Isao Noritake would be allowed to use another Lamborghini Murciélago R-GT chassis, borrowed from the French DAMS team, but Marco Apicella was not allowed to drive in the race due to the head injuries he sustained in his accident during qualifying, leaving the team with two drivers.

=== Thursday ===
The first session on Thursday began in heavy rain. Although some cars attempted to carry out wet weather testing, the conditions forced all the teams back to their garages. Once the rain began to slacken off cars returned to the track, but the rain continued throughout the entire session. No one was able to improve on their qualifying times from the previous day.

The rain continued throughout the second session, so most teams concentrated on their wet weather setups in preparation for a wet race. About halfway through the session the No. 7 Peugeot in the hands of Marc Gené missed the turn at Arnage and hit a tire barrier. The car was unable to return to the pits and was taken behind the wall by the marshals. This was soon followed by the No. 73 Luc Alphand Corvette missing the same turn as well, but it continued on without significant damage. The No. 70 PSI Corvette had a minor accident in the last five minutes of the session, bringing out the only red flag of the day and ending all of qualifying.

Audi led the wet sessions with a 4:01.257 time for the No. 1 car, followed by the No. 3 Audi and No. 8 Peugeot within a second. No. 33 Barazi-Epsilon again led the times for the second day in LMP2, while the No. 54 Oreca Saleen continued to show strong pace with the fastest time in GT1. The No. 93 Autorlando Sport Porsche was the fastest GT2 class entry in the rain.

=== Qualifying times ===
Class leaders and the fastest lap time on each day are in bold. No cars set a faster time on the second day.

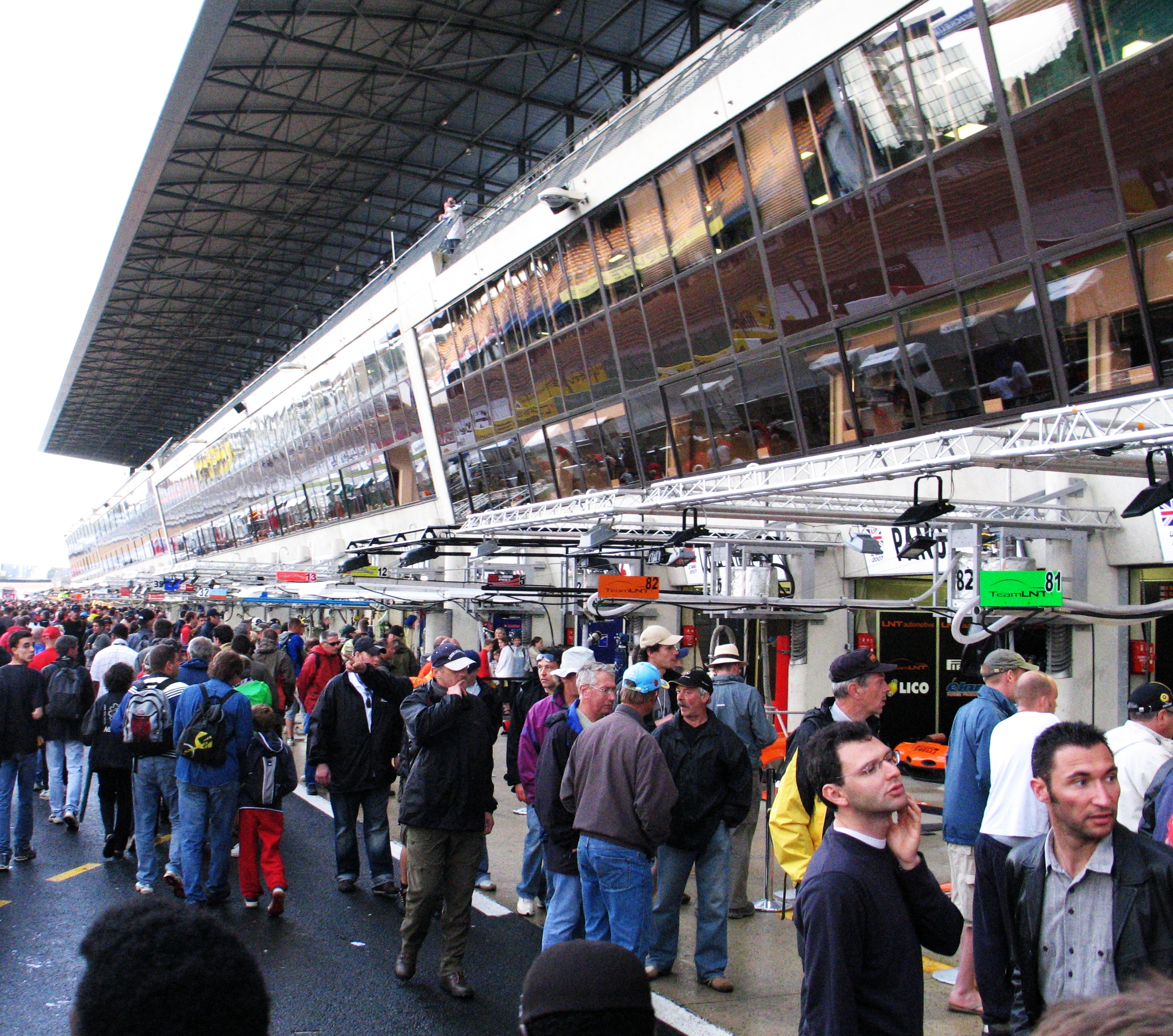
The crowd on the pit apron a few hours before the start of the race.

Pos	No.	Team	Car	Class	Day 1	Day 2	Gap
1	8	(France) **Team Peugeot Total**	Peugeot 908 HDi FAP	LMP1	**3:26.344**	4:01.928	**Leader**
2	2	(Germany) Audi Sport North America	Audi R10 TDI	LMP1	3:26.916	**4:01.257**	+0.572
3	7	(France) Team Peugeot Total	Peugeot 908 HDi FAP	LMP1	3:27.724	4:06.205	+1.380
4	1	(Germany) Audi Sport North America	Audi R10 TDI	LMP1	3:28.301	4:04.386	+1.957
5	3	(Germany) Audi Sport Team Joest	Audi R10 TDI	LMP1	3:29.736	4:01.629	+3.392
6	16	(France) Pescarolo Sport	Pescarolo 01-Judd	LMP1	3:33.590	4:11.511	+7.246
7	13	(France) Courage Compétition	Courage LC70-AER	LMP1	3:35.171	4:23.905	+8.827
8	18	(United Kingdom) Rollcentre Racing	Pescarolo 01-Judd	LMP1	3:35.559	4:26.442	+9.215
9	14	(Netherlands) Racing for Holland	Dome S101.5-Judd	LMP1	3:35.660	4:16.675	+9.316
10	9	(United Kingdom) Creation Autosportif	Creation CA07-Judd	LMP1	3:36.279	4:18.797	+9.935
11	15	(Czech Republic) Charouz Racing System	Lola B07/17-Judd	LMP1	3:37.737	4:12.490	+11.393
12	12	(France) Courage Compétition	Courage LC70-AER	LMP1	3:38.371	4:36.646	+12.027
13	17	(France) Pescarolo Sport	Pescarolo 01-Judd	LMP1	3:38.753	4:11.611	+12.409
14	5	(Switzerland) Swiss Spirit	Lola B07/18-Audi	LMP1	3:42.626	4:21.415	+16.282
15	33	(France) **Barazi-Epsilon**	Zytek 07S/2	LMP2	**3:44.158**	**4:11.296**	+17.814
16	19	(United Kingdom) Chamberlain-Synergy Motorsport	Lola B06/10-AER	LMP1	3:44.721	6:37.797	+18.377
17	40	(Portugal) Quifel ASM Team	Lola B05/40-AER	LMP2	3:45.838	4:47.127	+19.494
18	31	(United States) Binnie Motorsports	Lola B05/42-Zytek	LMP2	3:48.173	4:48.025	+21.829
19	21	(United Kingdom) Team Bruichladdich Radical	Radical SR9-AER	LMP2	3:48.332	4:37.507	+21.988
20	32	(France) Barazi-Epsilon	Zytek 07S/2	LMP2	3:48.935	4:14.508	+22.591
21	25	(United Kingdom) Ray Mallock Ltd.	MG-Lola EX264-AER	LMP2	3:49.217	4:17.297	+22.873
22	35	(Spain) Saulnier Racing	Courage LC70-AER	LMP2	3:49.621	4:32.963	+23.619
23	008	(France) **Aston Martin Racing Larbre**	Aston Martin DBR9	GT1	**3:50.761**	4:32.633	+24.417
24	55	(France) Team Oreca	Saleen S7-R	GT1	3:51.240	4:32.860	+24.896
25	20	(France) Pir Competition	Pilbeam MP93-Judd	LMP2	3:51.342	4:39.787	+24.998
26	64	(United States) Corvette Racing	Chevrolet Corvette C6.R	GT1	3:52.130	4:35.281	+25.686
27	009	(United Kingdom) Aston Martin Racing	Aston Martin DBR9	GT1	3:52.471	4:29.918	+26.127
28	44	(Germany) Kruse Motorsport	Pescarolo 01-Judd	LMP2	3:52.552	5:00.117	+26.208
29	63	(United States) Corvette Racing	Chevrolet Corvette C6.R	GT1	3:52.657	4:36.285	+26.313
30	59	(United Kingdom) Team Modena	Aston Martin DBR9	GT1	3:53.727	4:28.580	+27.383
31	54	(France) Team Oreca	Saleen S7-R	GT1	3:54.718	**4:26.955**	+28.374
32	100	(Italy) Aston Martin Racing BMS	Aston Martin DBR9	GT1	3:55.141	4:28.906	+28.798
33	72	(France) Luc Alphand Aventures	Chevrolet Corvette C6.R	GT1	3:55.668	4:39.531	+29.324
34	007	(United Kingdom) Aston Martin Racing	Aston Martin DBR9	GT1	3:55.714	4:28.604	+29.370
35	70	(Belgium) PSI Experience	Chevrolet Corvette C6.R	GT1	3:56.922	4:30.723	+30.578
36	24	(France) Noël del Bello Racing	Courage LC75-AER	LMP2	3:57.566	4:24.793	+31.222
37	73	(France) Luc Alphand Aventures	Chevrolet Corvette C5-R	GT1	3:59.068	4:52.166	+32.724
38	006	(France) Aston Martin Racing Larbre	Aston Martin DBR9	GT1	4:01.674	4:53.664	+35.330
39	87	(United Kingdom) **Scuderia Ecosse**	Ferrari F430 GT2	GT2	**4:04.185**	4:47.877	+37.841
40	76	(France) IMSA Performance Matmut	Porsche 997 GT3-RSR	GT2	4:04.622	4:38.386	+38.278
41	97	(United States) Risi Competizione	Ferrari F430 GT2	GT2	4:05.358	4:39.564	+39.012
42	80	(United States) Flying Lizard Motorsports	Porsche 997 GT3-RSR	GT2	4:05.588	4:41.736	+39.244
43	53	(Japan) JLOC Isao Noritake	Lamborghini Murciélago R-GT	GT1	4:06.223	–	+39.779
44	93	(Italy) Autorlando Sport	Porsche 997 GT3-RSR	GT2	4:08.211	**4:36.386**	+41.767
45	99	(United States) Risi Competizione	Ferrari F430 GT2	GT2	4:09.065	5:10.785	+42.721
46	67	(Czech Republic) Convers MenX Racing	Ferrari 550-GTS Maranello	GT1	4:09.088	4:39.343	+42.744
47	85	(Netherlands) Spyker Squadron	Spyker C8 Spyder GT2-R-Audi	GT2	4:10.719	4:48.139	+44.375
48	81	(United Kingdom) Team LNT	Panoz Esperante GT-LM-Ford	GT2	4:11.025	4:41.334	+44.681
49	86	(Netherlands) Spyker Squadron	Spyker C8 Spyder GT2-R-Audi	GT2	4:11:598	4:44.373	+45.254
50	82	(United Kingdom) Team LNT	Panoz Esperante GT-LM-Ford	GT2	4:13.049	4:46.961	+46.705
51	83	(Italy) GPC Sport	Ferrari F430 GT2	GT2	4:15.669	5:04.447	+49.325
52	71	(Germany) Seikel Motorsport	Porsche 997 GT3-RSR	GT2	4:17.750	5:03.369	+51.406
53	78	(Italy) AF Corse	Ferrari F430 GT2	GT2	4:21.714	4:53.812	+55.370
54	29	(Japan) T2M Motorsport	Dome S101.5-Mader	LMP2	4:53.983	4:54.729	+87.639

== Warm-up ==
The drivers took to the track at 09:00 Central European Summer Time (UTC+02:00) for a 45-minute warm-up session, which was used to check car functionality and components on a circuit dampened by overnight rainfall. The No. 8 Peugeot of Bourdais lapped fastest at 4:00.830, ahead of Allan McNish's No. 2 Audi in second and the other Audi of Marco Werner in third. Emmanuel Collard was the highest-placed Pescarolo entry in fourth. The fastest LMP2 time was a 4:17.127 from the Barazi Epsilon car driven by Vergers, who was four seconds quicker than RML's No. 25 Lola car used by Thomas Erdos. Oliver Gavin aboard the No. 64 Corvette topped the LMGT1 time sheets from the No. 007 Aston Martin of Enge as Patrick Long's No. 76 IMSA Porsche was fastest in LMGT2.

== Race ==
=== Start ===
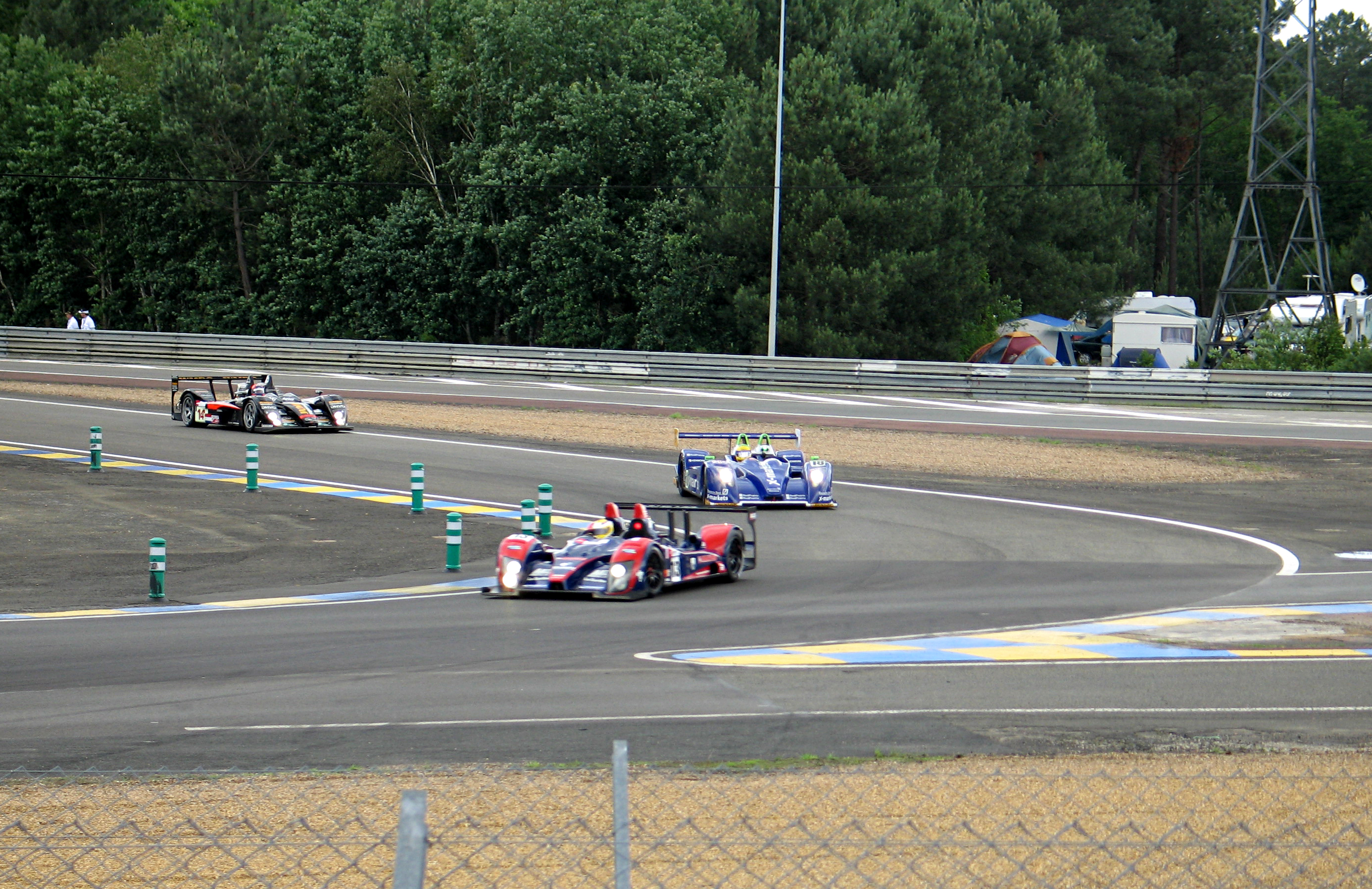
A group of Le Mans Prototypes at Mulsanne Corner during the early laps.

The race began at 3:00 pm local time (GMT+2), with the track still damp following a wet morning warm-up. It was spectated by 250,952 people. Sébastien Bourdais's Peugeot 908 HDi FAP led the field into the Dunlop Chicane, which he overshot, handing the lead to the No. 2 Audi R10 TDI. The three Audis took over the lead during the opening hour, before pit stops began.

The rebuilt Lamborghini of JLOC Isao Noritake was the first retirement of the race when the gearbox failed on the Mulsanne during its second lap of the race. Shortly after the first hour of the race had been completed, heavy rain resulted in the safety car being brought out again.

Soon after the field was released, the safety car was once again required after an accident in which Mike Rockenfeller spun his No. 3 Audi R10 TDI on the exit from Tertre Rouge, hitting the safety barriers on the Mulsannes Straight backwards. While crews fixed the barrier, Rockenfeller attempted to repair his Audi, but he was finally forced to retire. This caution period also saw an early retirement for the No. 64 Corvette when a part of its drivetrain broke while following the safety car. Gavin attempted to return to the pits using battery power but was stopped by the marshals, forcing him to abandon the car. The race eventually continued after nearly an hour under caution.

=== Night ===
As dusk began to fall on the drying track, the No. 8 Peugeot suffered from rear wheel hub failures which required two lengthy visits to the garage.

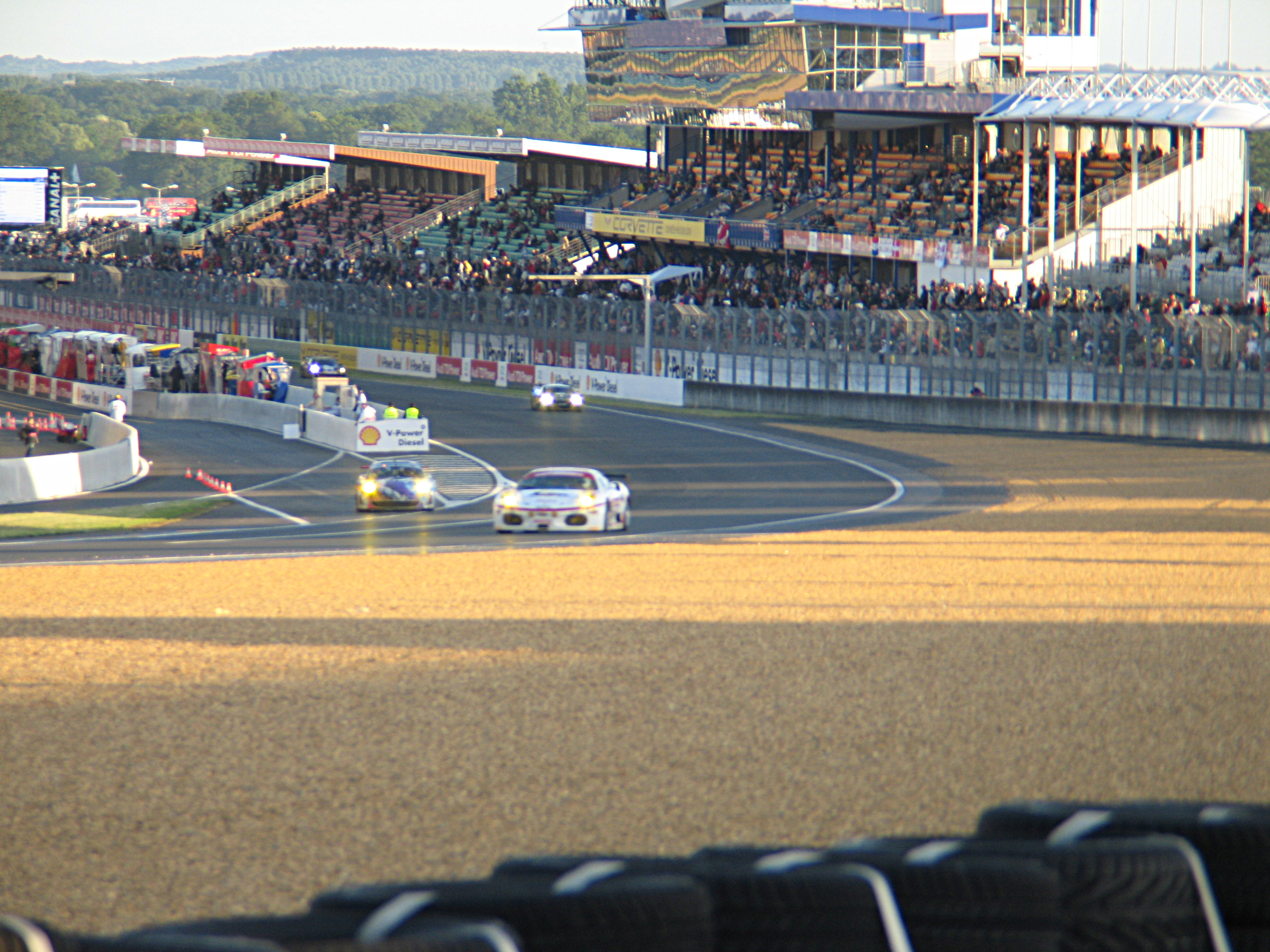
The start/finish complex and pit exit as the sun sets.

This allowed the No. 1 Audi to take over second place. Jacques Villeneuve's No. 7 Peugeot also lost time, which dropped it to two laps behind the No. 2 Audi. The No. 1 Audi had its own brief moment when the No. 63 Corvette clipped the Audi's rear end. The Corvette was forced to take evasive action through the Dunlop Chicane's gravel trap, and the Audi required replacement rear bodywork on its next pit stop.

A third safety car period was caused by the Creation Autosportif entry, which ran into the tire barriers at the Porsche Curves and needed to be extracted. The Creation returned to the pits but eventually retired. The Kruse Motorsport entry also suffered problems when it briefly stopped at the pit entrance during the caution period, blocking other cars attempting to make their own pit stops. The Kruse entry eventually succeeded in getting to its garage.

As the night continued and the race neared its halfway point, many cars suffered mechanical failures, putting them out of the race. They included a large number of the LMP2 class cars such as Team ASM and Ray Mallock Ltd., both of which had led the class at one point. In GT1, the two factory Aston Martins led the lone remaining factory Corvette by one lap, while the No. 97 Risi Competizione Ferrari had a two-lap lead in the GT2 class.

=== Morning ===
In the early hours, fluids were spilled on the track by the leader in GT2, the Risi Competizione Ferrari. This caused numerous competitors to spin, and required the Ferrari to undergo major front-end repairs, resulting in the car falling several laps behind.

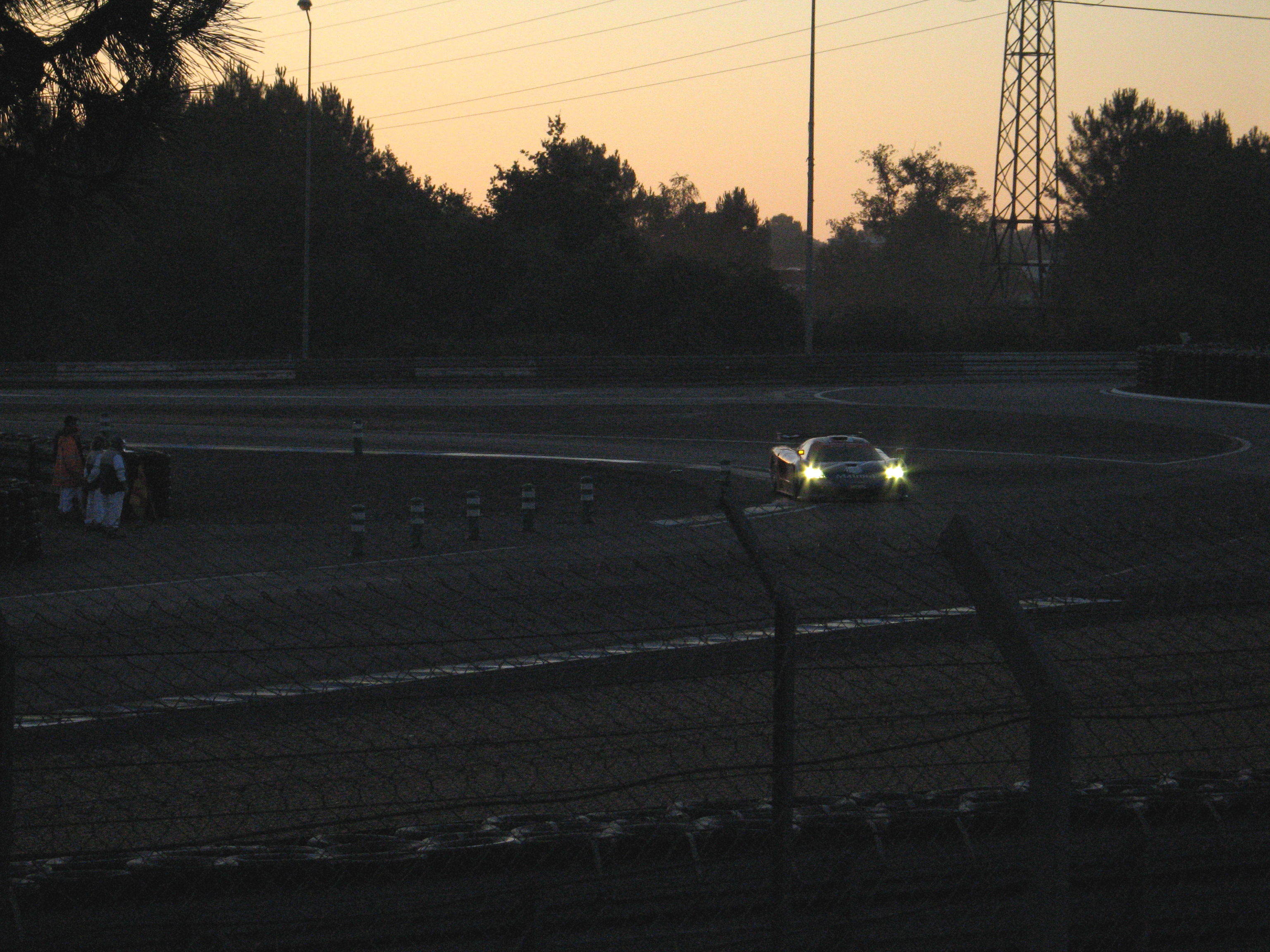
Early dawn at Mulsanne Corner.

The biggest problem of the morning though occurred shortly before the completion of the 17th hour, when the race-leading No. 2 Audi of Rinaldo Capello lost the left rear wheel at high speed at the Indianapolis corner. Unable to control the car he went straight on into a tire barrier. Although Capello attempted to get the car back to the pits, it was too badly damaged to be drivable. Television footage had recorded the No. 2 Audi being dropped off its airjacks before the left rear wheel was attached on the prior pit stop, but Audi claimed that this was likely not the cause of the wheel coming off at speed.

With two Audis out, this left the lone No. 1 Audi to take over the race lead, with the two Peugeots four and six laps behind respectively. Just before to the No. 2 Audi's accident, the GT1-leading Aston Martin had also come off the track, damaging its front splitter. The necessary repairs led to the car spending eight minutes in the garage, dropping it to fourth in class. The lone factory Corvette gained a place to take over second in class. Scuderia Ecosse's Ferrari briefly took over the GT2 lead after Risi's problems, but it too broke down on the track, handing the lead to the IMSA Performance Matmut Porsche. Binnie Motorsport's entry had a sizable lead in its class, having not suffered the many problems its LMP2 competitors had.

=== Finish ===
After having held off for most of the race, the rain began to fall once more during the final three hours. This caused numerous incidents, including the No. 93 Autorlando Porsche missing a Mulsanne chicane and plowing through a temporary tire barrier. The No. 7 Peugeot made an unscheduled garage stop and retired one lap after re-entering the race, claiming oil pressure problems.

The rain eventually became heavier, making the conditions treacherous and bringing the safety car back out. This put a temporary stop to the battle between Aston Martin and Corvette for first and second place in the GT1 class. The second place Corvette had been quicker in the wet conditions, but it was not allowed to further close on the Aston Martin during the safety period. After problems for both of the Barazi-Epsilon LMP2s, Binnie Motorsports brought its class leading LMP2 car to the garage to ensure that the car was prepared for the weather and could hold on to the lead until the finish.

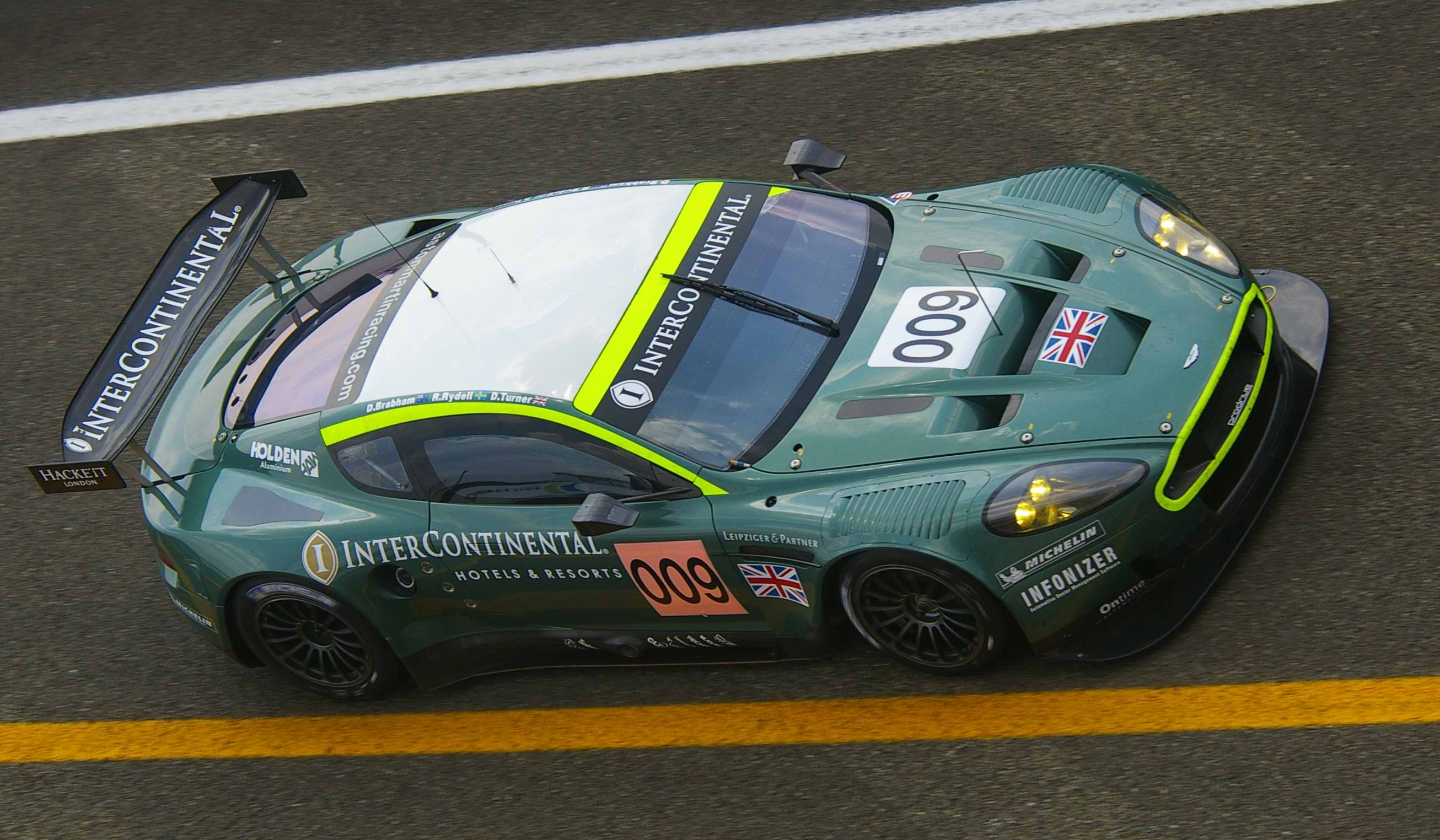
The No. 009 Aston Martin DBR9, winner of the GT1 class.

After over an hour behind the safety car, the field was released to race one last time with only twelve minutes remaining. With no close contests between the competitors, the field continued to run at less than racing pace, in preparation for the finish. The No. 8 Peugeot of Sébastien Bourdais briefly went into the pits, before returning to the track. To ensure that the Peugeot finished the race, and did not break down before crossing the finishing line behind the winner, Bourdais stopped at the Ford Chicanes on the final lap. Once the No. 1 Audi had gone past to take the checkered flag, Bourdais restarted the Peugeot and finished as well. The No. 16 Pescarolo finished the race in third, the highest placed petrol car.

The No. 009 Aston Martin took the GT1 class win by a single lap over the Corvette, earning Aston Martin its first victory since its overall win in 1959. The No. 76 IMSA Performance Matmut Porsche was the GT2 winner, with a six lap margin of victory. Only two cars finished in the LMP2 class. The No. 31 Binnie Motorsports Lola took the victory in spite of finishing 18th overall. Of the 54 starters, only 29 cars finished the race. The GT1 class cars proved themselves to be the most reliable, losing only two competitors over the 24 hours.

== Official results ==
Class winners are marked in bold. Cars finishing the race but not completing 75 per cent of the winner's distance are listed as Not Classified (NC).

Final race results
Pos	Class	No.	Team	Drivers	Chassis	Tyre	Laps	Time/Reason
Pos	Class	No.	Team	Drivers	Engine	Tyre	Laps	Time/Reason
1	**LMP1**	**1**	**(Germany) Audi Sport North America**	**(Germany) Marco Werner (Italy) Emanuele Pirro (Germany) Frank Biela**	**Audi R10 TDI**	MI	**369**	**24:02:42.628**
1	**LMP1**	**1**	**(Germany) Audi Sport North America**	**(Germany) Marco Werner (Italy) Emanuele Pirro (Germany) Frank Biela**	**Audi TDI 5.5L Turbo V12 (Diesel)**	MI	**369**	**24:02:42.628**
2	LMP1	8	(France) Team Peugeot Total	(France) Stéphane Sarrazin (Portugal) Pedro Lamy (France) Sébastien Bourdais	Peugeot 908 HDi FAP	MI	359	+10 Laps
2	LMP1	8	(France) Team Peugeot Total	(France) Stéphane Sarrazin (Portugal) Pedro Lamy (France) Sébastien Bourdais	Peugeot HDi 5.5L Turbo V12 (Diesel)	MI	359	+10 Laps
3	LMP1	16	(France) Pescarolo Sport	(France) Emmanuel Collard (France) Jean-Christophe Boullion (France) Romain Dumas	Pescarolo 01	MI	358	+11 Laps
3	LMP1	16	(France) Pescarolo Sport	(France) Emmanuel Collard (France) Jean-Christophe Boullion (France) Romain Dumas	Judd GV5.5 S2 5.5L V10	MI	358	+11 Laps
4	LMP1	18	(United Kingdom) Rollcentre Racing	(United Kingdom) Stuart Hall (Portugal) João Barbosa (United Kingdom) Martin Short	Pescarolo 01	D	347	+22 Laps
4	LMP1	18	(United Kingdom) Rollcentre Racing	(United Kingdom) Stuart Hall (Portugal) João Barbosa (United Kingdom) Martin Short	Judd GV5.5 S2 5.5L V10	D	347	+22 Laps
5	**GT1**	**009**	**(United Kingdom) Aston Martin Racing**	**(Australia) David Brabham (United Kingdom) Darren Turner (Sweden) Rickard Rydell**	**Aston Martin DBR9**	MI	**343**	**+26 Laps**
5	**GT1**	**009**	**(United Kingdom) Aston Martin Racing**	**(Australia) David Brabham (United Kingdom) Darren Turner (Sweden) Rickard Rydell**	**Aston Martin 6.0L V12**	MI	**343**	**+26 Laps**
6	GT1	63	(United States) Corvette Racing	(United States) Johnny O'Connell (Denmark) Jan Magnussen (Canada) Ron Fellows	Chevrolet Corvette C6.R	MI	342	+27 Laps
6	GT1	63	(United States) Corvette Racing	(United States) Johnny O'Connell (Denmark) Jan Magnussen (Canada) Ron Fellows	Chevrolet LS7-R 7.0L V8	MI	342	+27 Laps
7	GT1	008	(France) Aston Martin Racing Larbre	(France) Christophe Bouchut (Italy) Fabrizio Gollin (Denmark) Casper Elgaard	Aston Martin DBR9	MI	341	+28 Laps
7	GT1	008	(France) Aston Martin Racing Larbre	(France) Christophe Bouchut (Italy) Fabrizio Gollin (Denmark) Casper Elgaard	Aston Martin 6.0L V12	MI	341	+28 Laps
8	LMP1	15	(Czech Republic) Charouz Racing System	(Czech Republic) Jan Charouz (Germany) Stefan Mücke (Malaysia) Alex Yoong	Lola B07/17	MI	338	+31 Laps
8	LMP1	15	(Czech Republic) Charouz Racing System	(Czech Republic) Jan Charouz (Germany) Stefan Mücke (Malaysia) Alex Yoong	Judd GV5.5 S2 5.5L V10	MI	338	+31 Laps
9	GT1	007	(United Kingdom) Aston Martin Racing	(United Kingdom) Johnny Herbert (Netherlands) Peter Kox (Czech Republic) Tomáš Enge	Aston Martin DBR9	MI	337	+32 Laps
9	GT1	007	(United Kingdom) Aston Martin Racing	(United Kingdom) Johnny Herbert (Netherlands) Peter Kox (Czech Republic) Tomáš Enge	Aston Martin 6.0L V12	MI	337	+32 Laps
10	GT1	54	(France) Team Oreca	(France) Laurent Groppi (France) Nicolas Prost (France) Jean-Philippe Belloc	Saleen S7-R	MI	337	+32 Laps
10	GT1	54	(France) Team Oreca	(France) Laurent Groppi (France) Nicolas Prost (France) Jean-Philippe Belloc	Ford 7.0L V8	MI	337	+32 Laps
11	GT1	100	(Italy) Aston Martin Racing BMS	(Italy) Fabio Babini (United Kingdom) Jamie Davies (Italy) Matteo Malucelli	Aston Martin DBR9	P	336	+33 Laps
11	GT1	100	(Italy) Aston Martin Racing BMS	(Italy) Fabio Babini (United Kingdom) Jamie Davies (Italy) Matteo Malucelli	Aston Martin 6.0L V12	P	336	+33 Laps
12	GT1	72	(France) Luc Alphand Aventures	(France) Luc Alphand (France) Jérôme Policand (France) Patrice Goueslard	Chevrolet Corvette C6.R	MI	327	+42 Laps
12	GT1	72	(France) Luc Alphand Aventures	(France) Luc Alphand (France) Jérôme Policand (France) Patrice Goueslard	Chevrolet LS7-R 7.0L V8	MI	327	+42 Laps
13	LMP1	17	(France) Pescarolo Sport	(Switzerland) Harold Primat (France) Christophe Tinseau (France) Benoît Tréluyer	Pescarolo 01	MI	325	+44 Laps
13	LMP1	17	(France) Pescarolo Sport	(Switzerland) Harold Primat (France) Christophe Tinseau (France) Benoît Tréluyer	Judd GV5.5 S2 5.5L V10	MI	325	+44 Laps
14	GT1	67	(Czech Republic) Convers MenX Racing	(Russia) Alexey Vasilyev (Czech Republic) Tomáš Kostka (Czech Republic) Robert Pergl	Ferrari 550-GTS Maranello	P	322	+47 Laps
14	GT1	67	(Czech Republic) Convers MenX Racing	(Russia) Alexey Vasilyev (Czech Republic) Tomáš Kostka (Czech Republic) Robert Pergl	Ferrari F133 5.9L V12	P	322	+47 Laps
15	**GT2**	**76**	**(France) IMSA Performance Matmut**	**(France) Raymond Narac (Austria) Richard Lietz (United States) Patrick Long**	**Porsche 997 GT3-RSR**	MI	**320**	**+49 Laps**
15	**GT2**	**76**	**(France) IMSA Performance Matmut**	**(France) Raymond Narac (Austria) Richard Lietz (United States) Patrick Long**	**Porsche 3.8L Flat-6**	MI	**320**	**+49 Laps**
16	GT1	55	(France) Team Oreca	(Monaco) Stéphane Ortelli (France) Soheil Ayari (France) Nicolas Lapierre	Saleen S7-R	MI	318	+51 Laps
16	GT1	55	(France) Team Oreca	(Monaco) Stéphane Ortelli (France) Soheil Ayari (France) Nicolas Lapierre	Ford 7.0L V8	MI	318	+51 Laps
17	GT1	59	(United Kingdom) Team Modena	(Spain) Antonio García (Netherlands) Jos Menten (Brazil) Christian Fittipaldi	Aston Martin DBR9	MI	318	+51 Laps
17	GT1	59	(United Kingdom) Team Modena	(Spain) Antonio García (Netherlands) Jos Menten (Brazil) Christian Fittipaldi	Aston Martin 6.0L V12	MI	318	+51 Laps
18	**LMP2**	**31**	**(United States) Binnie Motorsports**	**(United States) William Binnie (United Kingdom) Allen Timpany (United Kingdom) Chris Buncombe**	**Lola B05/42**	KU	**318**	**+51 Laps**
18	**LMP2**	**31**	**(United States) Binnie Motorsports**	**(United States) William Binnie (United Kingdom) Allen Timpany (United Kingdom) Chris Buncombe**	**Zytek ZG348 3.4L V8**	KU	**318**	**+51 Laps**
19	GT2	99	(United States) Risi Competizione (United States) Krohn Racing	(United States) Tracy Krohn (Sweden) Niclas Jönsson (United States) Colin Braun	Ferrari F430 GT2	MI	314	+55 Laps
19	GT2	99	(United States) Risi Competizione (United States) Krohn Racing	(United States) Tracy Krohn (Sweden) Niclas Jönsson (United States) Colin Braun	Ferrari F136 4.0L V8	MI	314	+55 Laps
20	LMP1	19	(United Kingdom) Chamberlain-Synergy Motorsport	(United Kingdom) Gareth Evans (United Kingdom) Bob Berridge (United Kingdom) Peter Owen	Lola B06/10	MI	310	+59 Laps
20	LMP1	19	(United Kingdom) Chamberlain-Synergy Motorsport	(United Kingdom) Gareth Evans (United Kingdom) Bob Berridge (United Kingdom) Peter Owen	AER P32T 4.0L Turbo V8	MI	310	+59 Laps
21	GT2	93	(Italy) Autorlando Sport (Germany) Farnbacher Racing	(Germany) Pierre Ehret (Denmark) Lars-Erik Nielsen (Denmark) Allan Simonsen	Porsche 997 GT3-RSR	P	309	+60 Laps
21	GT2	93	(Italy) Autorlando Sport (Germany) Farnbacher Racing	(Germany) Pierre Ehret (Denmark) Lars-Erik Nielsen (Denmark) Allan Simonsen	Porsche 3.8L Flat-6	P	309	+60 Laps
22	GT2	78	(Italy) AF Corse (United Kingdom) Aucott Racing	(United Kingdom) Joe Macari (United Kingdom) Ben Aucott (United Kingdom) Adrian Newey	Ferrari F430 GT2	MI	308	+61 Laps
22	GT2	78	(Italy) AF Corse (United Kingdom) Aucott Racing	(United Kingdom) Joe Macari (United Kingdom) Ben Aucott (United Kingdom) Adrian Newey	Ferrari F136 4.0L V8	MI	308	+61 Laps
23	GT2	82	(United Kingdom) Team LNT	(United Kingdom) Lawrence Tomlinson (United Kingdom) Richard Dean (United Kingdom) Rob Bell	Panoz Esperante GT-LM	P	308	+61 Laps
23	GT2	82	(United Kingdom) Team LNT	(United Kingdom) Lawrence Tomlinson (United Kingdom) Richard Dean (United Kingdom) Rob Bell	Ford (Élan) 5.0L V8	P	308	+61 Laps
24	GT1	73	(France) Luc Alphand Aventures	(France) Jean-Luc Blanchemain (France) Didier André (Belgium) Vincent Vosse	Chevrolet Corvette C5-R	MI	306	+63 Laps
24	GT1	73	(France) Luc Alphand Aventures	(France) Jean-Luc Blanchemain (France) Didier André (Belgium) Vincent Vosse	Chevrolet LS7-R 7.0L V8	MI	306	+63 Laps
25	LMP1	14	(Netherlands) Racing for Holland b.v.	(Netherlands) Jan Lammers (Netherlands) Jeroen Bleekemolen (Netherlands) David Hart	Dome S101.5	MI	305	+64 Laps
25	LMP1	14	(Netherlands) Racing for Holland b.v.	(Netherlands) Jan Lammers (Netherlands) Jeroen Bleekemolen (Netherlands) David Hart	Judd GV5.5 S2 5.5L V10	MI	305	+64 Laps
26	LMP1	12	(France) Courage Compétition	(Switzerland) Alexander Frei (France) Jonathan Cochet (France) Bruno Besson	Courage LC70	MI	304	+65 Laps
26	LMP1	12	(France) Courage Compétition	(Switzerland) Alexander Frei (France) Jonathan Cochet (France) Bruno Besson	AER P32T 3.6L Turbo V8	MI	304	+65 Laps
27	LMP2	33	(France) Barazi-Epsilon (United Kingdom) Zytek Engineering	(Mexico) Adrian Fernández (Japan) Haruki Kurosawa (United Kingdom) Robbie Kerr	Zytek 07S/2	MI	301	+68 Laps
27	LMP2	33	(France) Barazi-Epsilon (United Kingdom) Zytek Engineering	(Mexico) Adrian Fernández (Japan) Haruki Kurosawa (United Kingdom) Robbie Kerr	Zytek ZG348 3.4L V8	MI	301	+68 Laps
28	GT1	70	(Belgium) PSI Experience	(France) Claude-Yves Gosselin (France) David Hallyday (Austria) Philipp Peter	Chevrolet Corvette C6.R	P	289	+70 Laps
28	GT1	70	(Belgium) PSI Experience	(France) Claude-Yves Gosselin (France) David Hallyday (Austria) Philipp Peter	Chevrolet LS7-R 7.0L V8	P	289	+70 Laps
29	GT1	006	(France) Aston Martin Racing Larbre	(France) Patrick Bornhauser (France) Roland Bervillé (United Kingdom) Gregor Fisken	Aston Martin DBR9	MI	272	+89 Laps
29	GT1	006	(France) Aston Martin Racing Larbre	(France) Patrick Bornhauser (France) Roland Bervillé (United Kingdom) Gregor Fisken	Aston Martin 6.0L V12	MI	272	+89 Laps
30 DNF	LMP1	7	(France) Team Peugeot Total	(France) Nicolas Minassian (Canada) Jacques Villeneuve (Spain) Marc Gené	Peugeot 908 HDi FAP	MI	338	Fuel injection
30 DNF	LMP1	7	(France) Team Peugeot Total	(France) Nicolas Minassian (Canada) Jacques Villeneuve (Spain) Marc Gené	Peugeot HDi 5.5L Turbo V12 (Diesel)	MI	338	Fuel injection
31 DNF	LMP1	2	(Germany) Audi Sport North America	(Denmark) Tom Kristensen (United Kingdom) Allan McNish (Italy) Rinaldo Capello	Audi R10 TDI	MI	262	Crash
31 DNF	LMP1	2	(Germany) Audi Sport North America	(Denmark) Tom Kristensen (United Kingdom) Allan McNish (Italy) Rinaldo Capello	Audi TDI 5.5L Turbo V12 (Diesel)	MI	262	Crash
32 DNF	LMP2	32	(France) Barazi-Epsilon	(Denmark) Juan Barazi (Netherlands) Michael Vergers (Saudi Arabia) Karim Ojjeh	Zytek 07S/2	MI	252	Crash
32 DNF	LMP2	32	(France) Barazi-Epsilon	(Denmark) Juan Barazi (Netherlands) Michael Vergers (Saudi Arabia) Karim Ojjeh	Zytek ZG348 3.4L V8	MI	252	Crash
33 DNF	GT2	83	(Italy) GPC Sport	(Hong Kong) Matthew Marsh (Sweden) Carl Rosenblad (Spain) Jesús Diez Villarroel	Ferrari F430 GT2	P	252	Mechanical
33 DNF	GT2	83	(Italy) GPC Sport	(Hong Kong) Matthew Marsh (Sweden) Carl Rosenblad (Spain) Jesús Diez Villarroel	Ferrari F136 4.0L V8	P	252	Mechanical
34 DNF	LMP2	25	(United Kingdom) Ray Mallock Ltd. (RML)	(United Kingdom) Mike Newton (United Kingdom) Andy Wallace (Brazil) Thomas Erdos	MG-Lola EX264	MI	251	Piston
34 DNF	LMP2	25	(United Kingdom) Ray Mallock Ltd. (RML)	(United Kingdom) Mike Newton (United Kingdom) Andy Wallace (Brazil) Thomas Erdos	AER P07 2.0L Turbo I4	MI	251	Piston
35 DNF	GT2	87	(United Kingdom) Scuderia Ecosse	(Canada) Chris Niarchos (United Kingdom) Tim Mullen (United Kingdom) Andrew Kirkaldy	Ferrari F430 GT2	P	241	Transmission
35 DNF	GT2	87	(United Kingdom) Scuderia Ecosse	(Canada) Chris Niarchos (United Kingdom) Tim Mullen (United Kingdom) Andrew Kirkaldy	Ferrari F136 4.0L V8	P	241	Transmission
36 DNF	LMP2	35	(Spain) Saulnier Racing	(France) Jacques Nicolet (France) Alain Filhol (France) Bruce Jouanny	Courage LC75	MI	224	Engine
36 DNF	LMP2	35	(Spain) Saulnier Racing	(France) Jacques Nicolet (France) Alain Filhol (France) Bruce Jouanny	AER P07 2.0L Turbo I4	MI	224	Engine
37 DNF	GT2	97	(United States) Risi Competizione	(Finland) Mika Salo (United Kingdom) Johnny Mowlem (Brazil) Jaime Melo	Ferrari F430 GT2	MI	223	Water pump
37 DNF	GT2	97	(United States) Risi Competizione	(Finland) Mika Salo (United Kingdom) Johnny Mowlem (Brazil) Jaime Melo	Ferrari F136 4.0L V8	MI	223	Water pump
38 DNF	LMP2	24	(France) Noël del Bello Racing	(Russia) Vitaly Petrov (France) Romain Ianetta (United States) Liz Halliday	Courage LC75	MI	198	Gearshift
38 DNF	LMP2	24	(France) Noël del Bello Racing	(Russia) Vitaly Petrov (France) Romain Ianetta (United States) Liz Halliday	AER P07 2.0L Turbo I4	MI	198	Gearshift
39 DNF	LMP1	13	(France) Courage Compétition	(France) Jean-Marc Gounon (France) Guillaume Moreau (Sweden) Stefan Johansson	Courage LC70	MI	175	Engine
39 DNF	LMP1	13	(France) Courage Compétition	(France) Jean-Marc Gounon (France) Guillaume Moreau (Sweden) Stefan Johansson	AER P32T 3.6L Turbo V8	MI	175	Engine
40 DNF	GT2	85	(Netherlands) Spyker Squadron b.v.	(Italy) Andrea Belicchi (Switzerland) Andrea Chiesa (Italy) Alex Caffi	Spyker C8 Spyder GT2-R	MI	145	Transmission
40 DNF	GT2	85	(Netherlands) Spyker Squadron b.v.	(Italy) Andrea Belicchi (Switzerland) Andrea Chiesa (Italy) Alex Caffi	Audi 3.8L V8	MI	145	Transmission
41 DNF	LMP2	40	Quifel ASM Team Racing for Portugal	(Portugal) Miguel Amaral (United Kingdom) Warren Hughes (Spain) Miguel Angel de Castro	Lola B05/40	D	137	Crash
41 DNF	LMP2	40	Quifel ASM Team Racing for Portugal	(Portugal) Miguel Amaral (United Kingdom) Warren Hughes (Spain) Miguel Angel de Castro	AER P07 2.0L Turbo I4	D	137	Crash
42 DNF	LMP2	20	(France) Pir Compétition	(France) Marc Rostan (United States) Chris MacAllister (United Kingdom) Gavin Pickering	Pilbeam MP93	MI	126	Spin
42 DNF	LMP2	20	(France) Pir Compétition	(France) Marc Rostan (United States) Chris MacAllister (United Kingdom) Gavin Pickering	Judd XV675 3.4L V8	MI	126	Spin
43 DNF	GT2	80	(United States) Flying Lizard Motorsports	(United States) Johannes van Overbeek (United States) Seth Neiman (Germany) Jörg Bergmeister	Porsche 997 GT3-RSR	MI	124	Gearbox
43 DNF	GT2	80	(United States) Flying Lizard Motorsports	(United States) Johannes van Overbeek (United States) Seth Neiman (Germany) Jörg Bergmeister	Porsche 3.8L Flat-6	MI	124	Gearbox
44 DNF	LMP2	44	(Germany) Kruse Motorsport	(Canada) Tony Burgess (France) Jean de Pourtales (Austria) Norbert Siedler	Pescarolo 01	KU	98	Engine
44 DNF	LMP2	44	(Germany) Kruse Motorsport	(Canada) Tony Burgess (France) Jean de Pourtales (Austria) Norbert Siedler	Judd XV675 3.4L V8	KU	98	Engine
45 DNF	GT2	86	(Netherlands) Spyker Squadron b.v.	(Czech Republic) Jaroslav Janiš (Netherlands) Mike Hezemans (United Kingdom) Jonny Kane	Spyker C8 Spyder GT2-R	MI	70	Engine
45 DNF	GT2	86	(Netherlands) Spyker Squadron b.v.	(Czech Republic) Jaroslav Janiš (Netherlands) Mike Hezemans (United Kingdom) Jonny Kane	Audi 3.8L V8	MI	70	Engine
46 DNF	GT2	71	(Germany) Seikel Motorsport (Germany) Team Felbermayr-Proton	(Austria) Horst Felbermayr (Austria) Horst Felbermayr Jr. (United States) Philip Collin	Porsche 997 GT3-RSR	Y	68	Electrical
46 DNF	GT2	71	(Germany) Seikel Motorsport (Germany) Team Felbermayr-Proton	(Austria) Horst Felbermayr (Austria) Horst Felbermayr Jr. (United States) Philip Collin	Porsche 3.8L Flat-6	Y	68	Electrical
47 DNF	LMP1	5	(Switzerland) Swiss Spirit	(Switzerland) Marcel Fässler (Switzerland) Jean-Denis Délétraz (Switzerland) Iradj Alexander	Lola B07/18	MI	62	Electrical
47 DNF	LMP1	5	(Switzerland) Swiss Spirit	(Switzerland) Marcel Fässler (Switzerland) Jean-Denis Délétraz (Switzerland) Iradj Alexander	Audi 3.6L Turbo V8	MI	62	Electrical
48 DNF	GT2	81	(United Kingdom) Team LNT	(United Kingdom) Tom Kimber-Smith (United Kingdom) Danny Watts (United States) Tom Milner Jr.	Panoz Esperante GT-LM	P	60	Gearbox
48 DNF	GT2	81	(United Kingdom) Team LNT	(United Kingdom) Tom Kimber-Smith (United Kingdom) Danny Watts (United States) Tom Milner Jr.	Ford (Élan) 5.0L V8	P	60	Gearbox
49 DNF	LMP2	29	(Japan) T2M Motorsport	(France) Robin Longechal (Japan) Yutaka Yamagishi (Japan) Yojiro Terada	Dome S101.5	MI	56	Overheating
49 DNF	LMP2	29	(Japan) T2M Motorsport	(France) Robin Longechal (Japan) Yutaka Yamagishi (Japan) Yojiro Terada	Mader 3.4L V8	MI	56	Overheating
50 DNF	LMP1	9	(United Kingdom) Creation Autosportif Ltd.	(United Kingdom) Jamie Campbell-Walter (Japan) Shinji Nakano (Bolivia) Felipe Ortiz	Creation CA07	D	55	Overheating
50 DNF	LMP1	9	(United Kingdom) Creation Autosportif Ltd.	(United Kingdom) Jamie Campbell-Walter (Japan) Shinji Nakano (Bolivia) Felipe Ortiz	Judd GV5.5 S2 5.5L V10	D	55	Overheating
51 DNF	LMP1	3	(Germany) Audi Sport Team Joest	(Germany) Lucas Luhr (Germany) Mike Rockenfeller (France) Alexandre Prémat	Audi R10 TDI	MI	23	Crash
51 DNF	LMP1	3	(Germany) Audi Sport Team Joest	(Germany) Lucas Luhr (Germany) Mike Rockenfeller (France) Alexandre Prémat	Audi TDI 5.5L Turbo V12 (Diesel)	MI	23	Crash
52 DNF	GT1	64	(United States) Corvette Racing	(United Kingdom) Oliver Gavin (Monaco) Olivier Beretta (Italy) Max Papis	Chevrolet Corvette C6.R	MI	22	Propshaft
52 DNF	GT1	64	(United States) Corvette Racing	(United Kingdom) Oliver Gavin (Monaco) Olivier Beretta (Italy) Max Papis	Chevrolet LS7-R 7.0L V8	MI	22	Propshaft
53 DNF	LMP2	21	(United Kingdom) Team Bruichladdich Radical	(United Kingdom) Tim Greaves (United Kingdom) Stuart Moseley (United Kingdom) Robin Liddell	Radical SR9	D	16	Crash
53 DNF	LMP2	21	(United Kingdom) Team Bruichladdich Radical	(United Kingdom) Tim Greaves (United Kingdom) Stuart Moseley (United Kingdom) Robin Liddell	AER P07 2.0L Turbo I4	D	16	Crash
54 DNF	GT1	53	(Japan) JLOC Isao Noritake	(Japan) Koji Yamanishi (Japan) Atsushi Yogo (Italy) Marco Apicella	Lamborghini Murciélago R-GT	Y	1	Driveshaft
54 DNF	GT1	53	(Japan) JLOC Isao Noritake	(Japan) Koji Yamanishi (Japan) Atsushi Yogo (Italy) Marco Apicella	Lamborghini L535 6.0L V12	Y	1	Driveshaft
DNQ	LMP1	10	(United Kingdom) Arena Motorsports International	(Sweden) Stefan Johansson (Japan) Hayanari Shimoda (United Kingdom) Tom Chilton	Zytek 07S	MI	–	Did not qualify
DNQ	LMP1	10	(United Kingdom) Arena Motorsports International	(Sweden) Stefan Johansson (Japan) Hayanari Shimoda (United Kingdom) Tom Chilton	Zytek 2ZG408 4.0L V8	MI	–	Did not qualify

Tyre manufacturers
Key
Symbol	Tyre manufacturer
**D**	Dunlop
**KU**	Kumho
**MI**	Michelin
**P**	Pirelli
**Y**	Yokohama
