= Michele Rugolo =

Italian racing driver (born 1982)

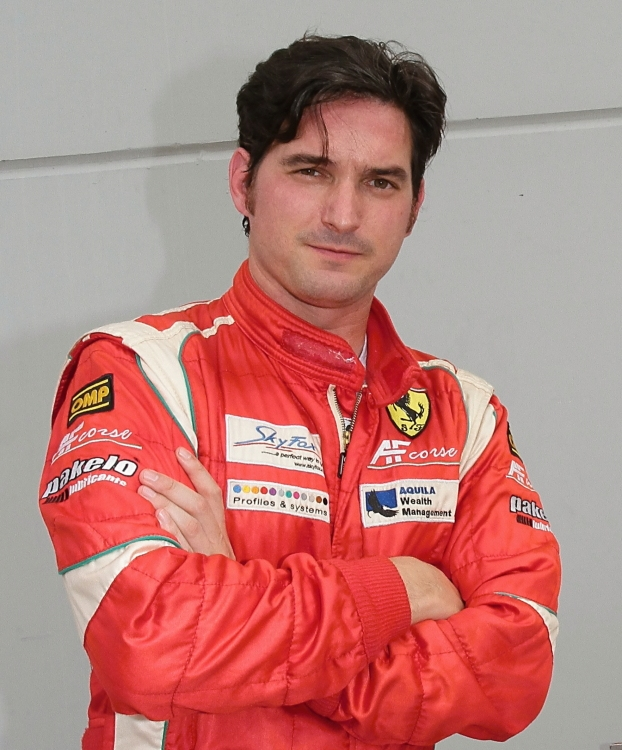
- Nationality: (Italy) Italian
- Born: August 31, 1982 (age 44) Montebelluna, Italy
- Categorisation: FIA Silver (until 2012, 2014, 2016, 2022–); FIA Gold (2013, 2015, 2017–2021)

24 Hours of Le Mans career
- Years: 2003, 2011 – 2012, 2014, 2017
- Teams: Automotive Durango SRL; Krohn Racing; AF Corse
- Best finish: 24th (2003)
- Class wins: 0

Michele Rugolo (born 31 August 1982 in Montebelluna) is an Italian racing driver.

== Career ==
=== Formula Renault ===
After competing in karting championships from 1992 to 1999, Rugolo competed in the Formula Renault 2000 Italy from 2000 to 2002, and then switched to Formula Nissan part-way through 2002.

=== Sports Cars ===
Rugolo competed in the 24 Hours of Le Mans in 2003, finishing 11th overall in a Durango-Judd. In 2005, he competed in the American Le Mans Series, driving a Dodge Viper GTS-R. For 2007, he competed in the GT2 class of the FIA GT Championship, and moved into the International GT Open championship the following year.

Rugolo joined Krohn Racing in 2011 for its Intercontinental Le Mans Cup GTE-Am class effort, which saw class wins at the Twelve Hours of Sebring and Petit Le Mans. Rugolo, Tracy Krohn and Nic Jonsson helped take the team to a second-place finish in the class championship.

In 2012, Rugolo would return to Krohn Racing in the FIA World Endurance Championship.

On Wednesday before the 2017 24 Hours of Le Mans, Lucas di Grassi wasn't able to get fast enough out of the car due to an ankle injury. Rugolo was asked to step in at the last moment, to replace di Grassi.

=== Formula Three ===
Rugolo has also competed in single seaters, coming fourth in Italian Formula Three in both 2004 and 2006.

=== Formula 3000 ===
Rugolo's success in F3 and connections with Durango, who also ran a Formula 3000 team, saw him called up to the series for the final race of the 2004 season; his home race at Monza. He retired from the race.

=== A1 Grand Prix ===
Rugolo was also one of A1 Team Italy's drivers for the 2006–07 season, although he did not compete in a race in favour of Enrico Toccacelo or Alessandro Pier Guidi.

== Racing record ==
=== Complete International Formula 3000 results ===
(key) (Races in bold indicate pole position; races in italics indicate fastest lap.)

Year	Entrant	1	2	3	4	5	6	7	8	9	10	DC	Points
2004	Durango Corse	IMO	CAT	MON	NUR	MAG	SIL	HOC	HUN	SPA	MNZ; Ret	–	0

=== 24 Hours of Le Mans results ===
Year	Team	Co-Drivers	Car	Class	Laps	Pos.	Class Pos.
2003	(Italy) Automotive Durango SRL	(France) Sylvain Boulay (France) Jean-Bernard Bouvet	Durango LMP1-Judd	LMP900	277	24th	9th
2011	(United States) Krohn Racing	(United States) Tracy Krohn (Sweden) Niclas Jönsson	Ferrari F430 GTC	GTE; Am	123	DNF	DNF
2012	(United States) Krohn Racing	(United States) Tracy Krohn (Sweden) Niclas Jönsson	Ferrari 458 Italia GT2	GTE; Am	323	25th	**3rd**
2014	(Italy) AF Corse	(Australia) Stephen Wyatt (United Kingdom) Sam Bird	Ferrari 458 Italia GT2	GTE; Am	22	DNF	DNF
2017	(Italy) AF Corse	(United Kingdom) James Calado (Italy) Alessandro Pier Guidi	Ferrari 488 GTE	GTE; Pro	312	46th	11th

=== Complete FIA World Endurance Championship results ===
(key) (Races in bold indicate pole position) (Races in italics indicate fastest lap)

Year	Entrant	Class	Chassis	Engine	1	2	3	4	5	6	7	8	9	Rank	Points
2012	Krohn Racing	LMGTE Am	Ferrari 458 Italia GT2	Ferrari F142 4.5 V8	SEB; 5	SPA; 5	LMS; 2	SIL; 3	SÃO; Ret	BHR; 3	FUJ; 2	SHA; 3		57th	3.5
2014	AF Corse	LMGTE Am	Ferrari 458 Italia GT2	Ferrari F142 4.5 V8	**SIL**; **3**	SPA; 5	**LMS**; **Ret**	COA; 6	FUJ; Ret	SHA	BHR; 2	SÃO; 3		7th	68
2017	AF Corse	LMGTE Pro	Ferrari 488 GTE	Ferrari F154CB 3.9 L Turbo V8	SIL	SPA	LMS; 14	NÜR	MEX	COA	FUJ	SHA	BHR	24th	1

=== Complete IMSA SportsCar Championship results ===
(key) (Races in bold indicate pole position) (Races in italics indicate fastest lap)

Year	Entrant	Class	Make	Engine	1	2	3	4	5	6	7	8	9	10	11	Pos.	Points
2014	Spirit of Race	GTD	Ferrari 458 Italia GT3	Ferrari 4.5L V8	DAY; 17	SEB; 13	LGA	DET	WGL; 19	MOS	IND	ELK	VIR	COA	COA; 6	37th	63
2015	AF Corse	GTD	Ferrari 458 Italia GT3	Ferrari 4.5L V8	DAY; 4	SEB	LGA	BEL	WGL	LIM	ELK	VIR	AUS	ATL		35th	29
