= Tracy Krohn =

American racing driver

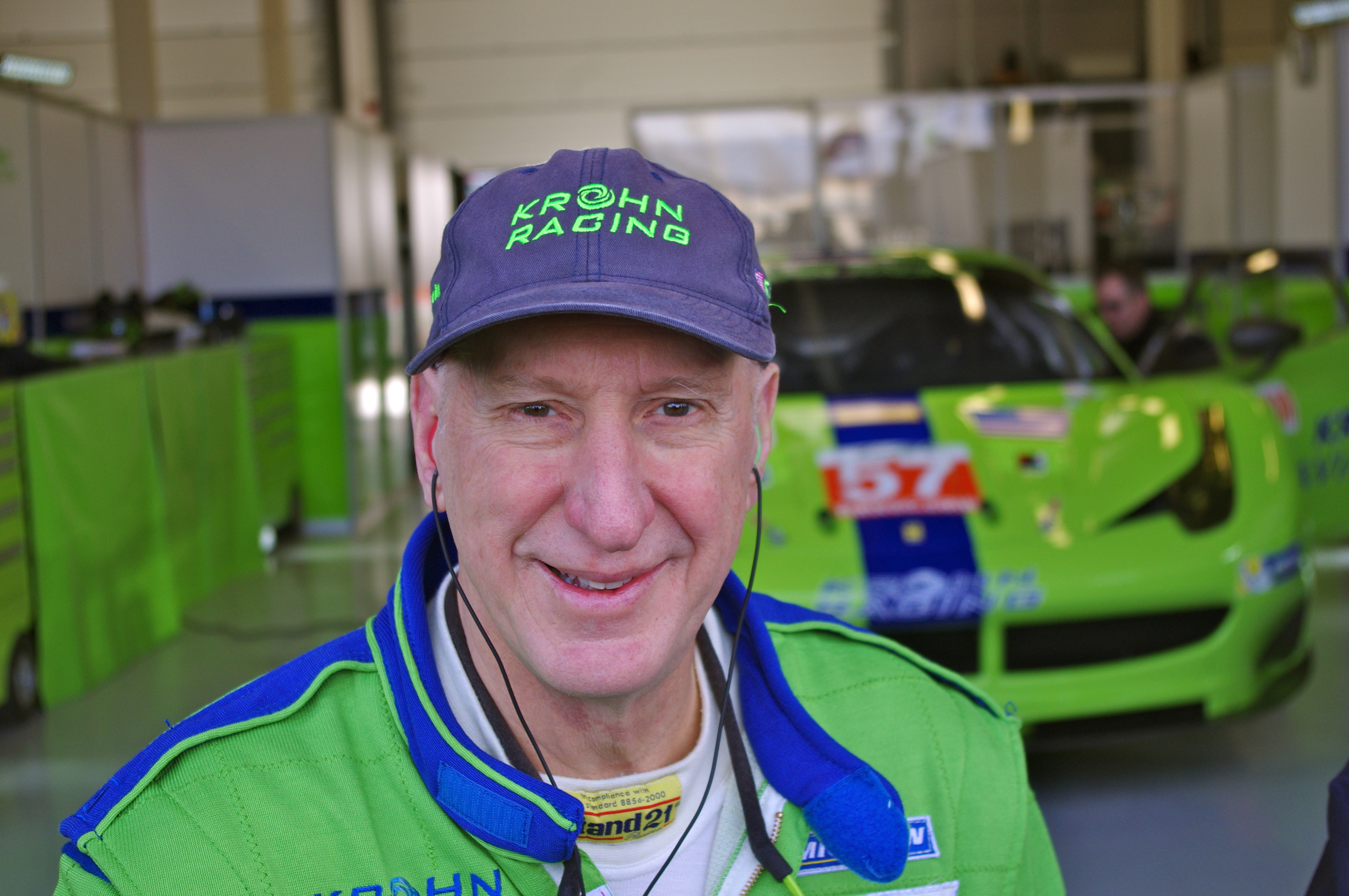
- Krohn at the 2013 6 Hours of Silverstone
- Nationality: (United States) American
- Born: 26 August 1954 (age 72) Houston, Texas, U.S.
- Categorisation: FIA Silver (until 2013); FIA Bronze (2014–)

24 Hours of Le Mans career
- Years: 2006 –
- Teams: White Lightning Racing, Krohn Racing
- Best finish: 19th (2007)
- Class wins: 0

Tracy William Krohn (born August 26, 1954, in Houston, Texas) is an entrepreneur and auto racing enthusiast who was a new addition to the 2006 Forbes 400 list of the wealthiest Americans, at #320.

== Biography ==
Krohn has a petroleum engineering degree from Louisiana State University and has worked as an engineer and drilling supervisor for Mobil Oil. Krohn founded W&T Offshore with $12,000 in 1983. He resides in Houston.

Krohn's racing team, Krohn Racing currently competes in the European Le Mans Series.In March 2007, he and Lola Racing Cars created Proto-Auto LLC and purchased a chassis design and Grand American Daytona Prototype Constructors Licence from Multimatic Motorsports, a racing car constructor, to build a Lola chassis for Grand-Am Daytona Prototype competition in 2008 and beyond.

Krohn entered the Intercontinental Le Mans Cup in 2011, finishing second in the GTE-Am class standings. Since 2012, the team competes in the FIA World Endurance Championship. They started off with a Ferrari F458 Italia in GTE-Am, but since 2015, they compete in the LMP2 class with a Ligier JS P2 powered by Judd.

== Racing record ==
=== 24 Hours of Le Mans results ===
| Year | Team | Co-Drivers | Car | Class | Laps | Pos. | Class Pos. |
|---|---|---|---|---|---|---|---|
| 2006 | (United States) White Lightning Racing (United States) Krohn Racing | (Germany) Jörg Bergmeister (Sweden) Niclas Jönsson | Porsche 911 GT3-RSR | GT2 | 148 | DNF | DNF |
| 2007 | (United States) Risi Competizione (United States) Krohn Racing | (Sweden) Niclas Jönsson (United States) Colin Braun | Ferrari F430 GT2 | GT2 | 314 | 19th | **2nd** |
| 2008 | (United States) Risi Competizione (United States) Krohn Racing | (Sweden) Niclas Jönsson (Belgium) Eric van de Poele | Ferrari F430 GT2 | GT2 | 12 | DNF | DNF |
| 2009 | (United States) Risi Competizione (United States) Krohn Racing | (Sweden) Niclas Jönsson (Belgium) Eric van de Poele | Ferrari F430 GT2 | GT2 | 323 | 22nd | **3rd** |
| 2010 | (United States) Risi Competizione (United States) Krohn Racing | (Sweden) Niclas Jönsson (Belgium) Eric van de Poele | Ferrari F430 GT2 | GT2 | 197 | DNF | DNF |
| 2011 | (United States) Krohn Racing | (Sweden) Niclas Jönsson (Italy) Michele Rugolo | Ferrari F430 GT2 | GTE; Am | 123 | DNF | DNF |
| 2012 | (United States) Krohn Racing | (Sweden) Niclas Jönsson (Italy) Michele Rugolo | Ferrari 458 Italia GT2 | GTE; Am | 323 | 25th | **3rd** |
| 2013 | (United States) Krohn Racing | (Sweden) Niclas Jönsson (Italy) Maurizio Mediani | Ferrari 458 Italia GT2 | GTE; Am | 111 | DNF | DNF |
| 2014 | (United States) Krohn Racing | (Sweden) Niclas Jönsson (United Kingdom) Ben Collins | Ferrari 458 Italia GT2 | GTE; Am | 325 | 30th | 10th |
| 2015 | (United States) Krohn Racing | (Portugal) João Barbosa (Sweden) Niclas Jönsson | Ligier JS P2-Judd | LMP2 | 323 | 32nd | 12th |
| 2016 | (United States) Krohn Racing | (Portugal) João Barbosa (Sweden) Niclas Jönsson | Ligier JS P2-Nissan | LMP2 | 338 | 22nd | 13th |
| 2017 | (Hong Kong) DH Racing | (Sweden) Niclas Jönsson (Italy) Andrea Bertolini | Ferrari 488 GTE | GTE; Am | 320 | 42nd | 13th |
| 2018 | (Philippines) Eurasia Motorsport | (Sweden) Niclas Jönsson (Italy) Andrea Bertolini | Ligier JS P217-Gibson | LMP2 | 334 | NC | NC |
| 2019 | (Germany) Dempsey-Proton Racing | (Sweden) Niclas Jönsson (United States) Patrick Long | Porsche 911 RSR | GTE; Am | - | WD | WD |

=== Complete European Le Mans Series results ===
(key) (Races in bold indicate pole position; races in italics indicate fastest lap)

| Year | Entrant | Class | Car | Engine | 1 | 2 | 3 | 4 | 5 | 6 | Pos. | Pts |
|---|---|---|---|---|---|---|---|---|---|---|---|---|
| 2011 | Krohn Racing | LMGTE Am | Ferrari F430 GTE | Ferrari 4.0 V8 | LEC | SPA; 8 | IMO; 6 | SIL; 7 | EST | | NC | 0 |
| 2015 | Krohn Racing | LMP2 | Ligier JS P2 | Judd HK 3.6 L V8 | SIL; 4 | IMO; 5 | RBR; 5 | LEC; 5 | EST; 8 | | 6th | 46 |
| 2016 | Krohn Racing | LMP2 | Ligier JS P2 | Nissan VK45DE 4.5 L V8 | SIL; 4 | IMO | RBR; 9 | LEC; 8 | SPA; 10 | EST | 18th | 19 |
| 2018 | Krohn Racing | LMGTE | Ferrari 488 GTE | Ferrari F154CB 3.9 L Turbo V8 | LEC; 4 | MNZ; 6 | RBR; 5 | SIL; 6 | SPA; Ret | ALG; 5 | 8th | 48 |

=== Complete FIA World Endurance Championship results ===
(key) (Races in bold indicate pole position; races in italics indicate fastest lap)

| Year | Entrant | Class | Car | Engine | 1 | 2 | 3 | 4 | 5 | 6 | 7 | 8 | Pos. | Pts |
|---|---|---|---|---|---|---|---|---|---|---|---|---|---|---|
| 2012 | Krohn Racing | LMGTE Am | Ferrari 458 Italia GT2 | Ferrari F142 4.5 V8 | SEB; 5 | SPA; 5 | LMS; 2 | SIL; 3 | SÃO; Ret | BHR; 3 | FUJ; 2 | SHA; 3 | 57th | 3.5 |
| 2013 | Krohn Racing | LMGTE Am | Ferrari 458 Italia GT2 | Ferrari F142 4.5 V8 | SIL; 6 | SPA; 7 | LMS; Ret | SÃO; 5 | COA; 8 | FUJ; 6 | SHA; Ret | BHR; Ret | 17th | 32 |

=== Complete WeatherTech SportsCar Championship results ===
(key) (Races in bold indicate pole position; results in italics indicate fastest lap)

| Year | Team | Class | Make | Engine | 1 | 2 | 3 | 4 | 5 | 6 | 7 | 8 | 9 | 10 | 11 | Pos. | Pts | Ref |
|---|---|---|---|---|---|---|---|---|---|---|---|---|---|---|---|---|---|---|
| 2014 | Krohn Racing | GTLM | Ferrari 458 Italia GT2 | Ferrari F142 4.5 V8 | DAY; 7 | SEB; 4 | LBH | LGA; 11 | WGL; 11 | MOS | IMS | ELK | VIR | COA | PET; 9 | 17th | 119 | |
| 2015 | Krohn Racing | P | Ligier JS P2 | Judd HK 3.6 L V8 | DAY; 13 | SEB; 6 | LBH | LGA | DET | WGL | MOS | ELK | COA | PET | | 20th | 45 | |
| 2016 | Flying Lizard Motorsports | GTD | Audi R8 LMS ultra | Audi 5.2 V10 | DAY; 19 | SEB; 15 | LAG | DET | WGL | MOS | LIM | ROA | VIR | COA | PET | 40th | 30 | |

== See also ==
- Krohn Racing
