= Niclas Jönsson =

Swedish racing driver

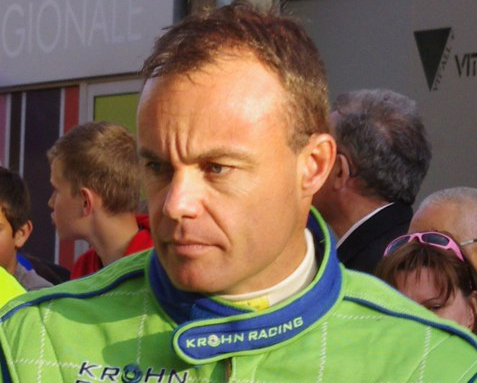
- Jönsson at the 2011 24 Hours of Le Mans driver parade
- Nationality: Swedish
- Born: Niclas Lennart Jönsson; 4 August 1967 (age 59) Jönköping, Sweden
- Current team: Krohn Racing
- Categorisation: FIA Gold (until 2015); FIA Silver (2016–2022); FIA Bronze (2023–)

24 Hours of Le Mans career
- Years: 2006–2019
- Teams: White Lightning Racing, Risi Competizione/Krohn Racing
- Best finish: 19th (2007)

NASCAR O'Reilly Auto Parts Series career
- 1 race run over 1 year
- Best finish: 121st (2007)
- First race: 2007 NAPA Auto Parts 200 (Montreal)
| Wins | Top tens | Poles |
|---|---|---|
| 0 | 0 | 0 |

IndyCar Series career
- 3 races run over 2 years
- Best finish: 31st (2000)
- First race: 1999 Vegas.com 500 (Las Vegas)
- Last race: 2000 MCI WorldCom Indy 200 (Phoenix)
| Wins | Podiums | Poles |
|---|---|---|
| 0 | 0 | 0 |

Niclas Lennart "Nic" Jönsson (born 4 August 1967) is a Swedish racing driver who most recently competed in the FIA World Endurance Championship. He drove in the Indy Racing League in the 1999 and 2000 seasons with four career starts. His best career IRL finish was in 12th position in the 2000 Delphi Indy 200 held at Walt Disney World Speedway.

Jönsson made one NASCAR Busch Series (now O'Reilly Auto Parts Series) start at Montreal in August 2007, he started eighth, led five laps, and finished twelfth in the No. 28 car for Jay Robinson Racing.

In 2009, Jönsson was hired by US F1 Team owner Ken Anderson as a test driver for the fledgling American Formula 1 team.

== Racing record ==
=== Complete American Open-Wheel racing results ===
(key)

=== American open–wheel racing results ===
(key) (Races in bold indicate pole position) (Races in italics indicate fastest lap)

==== Indy Lights ====
| Year | Team | 1 | 2 | 3 | 4 | 5 | 6 | 7 | 8 | 9 | 10 | 11 | 12 | Rank | Points | Ref |
|---|---|---|---|---|---|---|---|---|---|---|---|---|---|---|---|---|
| 1994 | McCormack Racing | PHX | LBH | MIL | DET | POR | CLE | TOR | MDO | NHA | VAN | NAZ | LAG; 9 | **26th** | **4** | |
| 1996 | Dorricott Racing | MIA | LBH; 17 | NAZ | MIS | MIL | DET | POR | CLE | TOR | TRO | VAN | LS | **35th** | **0** | |

==== Indy Racing League ====
(key) (Races in bold indicate pole position)

| Year | Team | No. | Chassis | Engine | 1 | 2 | 3 | 4 | 5 | 6 | 7 | 8 | 9 | 10 | 11 | Rank | Points | Ref |
|---|---|---|---|---|---|---|---|---|---|---|---|---|---|---|---|---|---|---|
| 1999 | Blueprint-Immke Racing | 27 | G-Force | Oldsmobile Aurora V8 | WDW | PHX | CLT | INDY | TXS | PPR | ATL | DOV | PPR | LVS; 24 | TXS; DNS | **43rd** | **9** | |
| 2000 | Blueprint Racing | 27 | G-Force | Oldsmobile Aurora V8 | WDW; 12 | | | | | | | | | | | **31st** | **27** | |
| 2000 | Nienhouse Motorsports | 17 | G-Force | Oldsmobile Aurora V8 | | PHX; 21 | LVS | INDY | TXS | PPR | ATL | KTY | TXS | | | **31st** | **27** | |

=== 24 Hours of Le Mans results ===
| Year | Team | Co-Drivers | Car | Class | Laps | Pos. | Class Pos. |
|---|---|---|---|---|---|---|---|
| 2006 | (United States) White Lightning Racing (United States) Krohn Racing | (United States) Tracy Krohn (Germany) Jörg Bergmeister | Porsche 911 GT3-RSR | GT2 | 148 | DNF | DNF |
| 2007 | (United States) Risi Competizione (United States) Krohn Racing | (United States) Tracy Krohn (United States) Colin Braun | Ferrari F430 GT2 | GT2 | 314 | 19th | **2nd** |
| 2008 | (United States) Risi Competizione (United States) Krohn Racing | (United States) Tracy Krohn (Belgium) Eric van de Poele | Ferrari F430 GT2 | GT2 | 12 | DNF | DNF |
| 2009 | (United States) Risi Competizione (United States) Krohn Racing | (United States) Tracy Krohn (Belgium) Eric van de Poele | Ferrari F430 GT2 | GT2 | 323 | 22nd | **3rd** |
| 2010 | (United States) Risi Competizione (United States) Krohn Racing | (United States) Tracy Krohn (Belgium) Eric van de Poele | Ferrari F430 GT2 | GT2 | 197 | DNF | DNF |
| 2011 | (United States) Krohn Racing | (United States) Tracy Krohn (Italy) Michele Rugolo | Ferrari F430 GT2 | GTE; Am | 123 | DNF | DNF |
| 2012 | (United States) Krohn Racing | (United States) Tracy Krohn (Italy) Michele Rugolo | Ferrari 458 Italia GT2 | GTE; Am | 323 | 25th | **3rd** |
| 2013 | (United States) Krohn Racing | (United States) Tracy Krohn (Italy) Maurizio Mediani | Ferrari 458 Italia GT2 | GTE; Am | 111 | DNF | DNF |
| 2014 | (United States) Krohn Racing | (United States) Tracy Krohn (United Kingdom) Ben Collins | Ferrari 458 Italia GT2 | GTE; Am | 325 | 30th | 10th |
| 2015 | (United States) Krohn Racing | (Portugal) João Barbosa (United States) Tracy Krohn | Ligier JS P2-Judd | LMP2 | 323 | 32nd | 12th |
| 2016 | (United States) Krohn Racing | (Portugal) João Barbosa (United States) Tracy Krohn | Ligier JS P2-Nissan | LMP2 | 338 | 22nd | 13th |
| 2017 | (Hong Kong) DH Racing | (United States) Tracy Krohn (Italy) Andrea Bertolini | Ferrari 488 GTE | GTE; Am | 320 | 42nd | 13th |
| 2018 | (Philippines) Eurasia Motorsport | (Italy) Andrea Bertolini (United States) Tracy Krohn | Ligier JS P217-Gibson | LMP2 | 334 | NC | NC |
| 2019 | (Germany) Dempsey-Proton Racing | (United States) Tracy Krohn (United States) Patrick Long | Porsche 911 RSR | GTE; Am | - | WD | WD |

=== NASCAR ===
(key) (Bold – Pole position awarded by qualifying time. Italics – Pole position earned by points standings or practice time. * – Most laps led.)

==== Busch Series ====
NASCAR Busch Series results
| Year | Team | No. | Make | 1 | 2 | 3 | 4 | 5 | 6 | 7 | 8 | 9 | 10 | 11 | 12 | 13 | 14 | 15 | 16 | 17 | 18 | 19 | 20 | 21 | 22 | 23 | 24 | 25 | 26 | 27 | 28 | 29 | 30 | 31 | 32 | 33 | 34 | 35 | NBSC | Pts | Ref |
|---|---|---|---|---|---|---|---|---|---|---|---|---|---|---|---|---|---|---|---|---|---|---|---|---|---|---|---|---|---|---|---|---|---|---|---|---|---|---|---|---|---|
| 2007 | Jay Robinson Racing | 28 | Chevy | DAY | CAL | MXC | LVS | ATL | BRI | NSH | TEX | PHO | TAL | RCH | DAR | CLT | DOV | NSH | KEN | MLW | NHA | DAY | CHI | GTY | IRP | CGV; 12 | GLN | MCH | BRI | CAL | RCH | DOV | KAN | CLT | MEM | TEX | PHO | HOM | 121st | 132 | |

=== Complete European Le Mans Series results ===
(key) (Races in bold indicate pole position; races in italics indicate fastest lap)

| Year | Entrant | Class | Car | Engine | 1 | 2 | 3 | 4 | 5 | 6 | Pos. | Pts |
|---|---|---|---|---|---|---|---|---|---|---|---|---|
| 2011 | Krohn Racing | LMGTE Am | Ferrari F430 GTE | Ferrari 4.0 V8 | LEC | SPA; 8 | IMO; 6 | SIL; 7 | EST | | NC | 0 |
| 2015 | Krohn Racing | LMP2 | Ligier JS P2 | Judd HK 3.6 L V8 | SIL; 4 | IMO; 5 | RBR; 5 | LEC; 5 | EST; 8 | | 6th | 46 |
| 2016 | Krohn Racing | LMP2 | Ligier JS P2 | Nissan VK45DE 4.5 L V8 | SIL; 4 | IMO; 6 | RBR; 9 | LEC; 8 | SPA; 10 | EST; 4 | 9th | 39 |
| 2018 | Krohn Racing | LMGTE | Ferrari 488 GTE | Ferrari F154CB 3.9 L Turbo V8 | LEC; 4 | MNZ; 6 | RBR; 5 | SIL; 6 | SPA; Ret | ALG; 5 | 8th | 48 |

=== Complete FIA World Endurance Championship results ===
(key) (Races in bold indicate pole position; races in italics indicate fastest lap)

| Year | Entrant | Class | Car | Engine | 1 | 2 | 3 | 4 | 5 | 6 | 7 | 8 | Pos. | Pts |
|---|---|---|---|---|---|---|---|---|---|---|---|---|---|---|
| 2012 | Krohn Racing | LMGTE Am | Ferrari 458 Italia GT2 | Ferrari F142 4.5 V8 | SEB; 5 | SPA; 5 | LMS; 2 | SIL; 3 | SÃO; Ret | BHR; 3 | FUJ; 2 | SHA; 3 | 57th | 3.5 |
| 2013 | Krohn Racing | LMGTE Am | Ferrari 458 Italia GT2 | Ferrari F142 4.5 V8 | SIL; 6 | SPA; 7 | LMS; Ret | SÃO; 5 | COA; 8 | FUJ; 6 | SHA; Ret | BHR; Ret | 17th | 32 |

=== Complete WeatherTech SportsCar Championship results ===
(key) (Races in bold indicate pole position; results in italics indicate fastest lap)

| Year | Team | Class | Make | Engine | 1 | 2 | 3 | 4 | 5 | 6 | 7 | 8 | 9 | 10 | 11 | 12 | Pos. | Pts | Ref |
|---|---|---|---|---|---|---|---|---|---|---|---|---|---|---|---|---|---|---|---|
| 2014 | Krohn Racing | GTLM | Ferrari 458 Italia GT2 | Ferrari F142 4.5 V8 | DAY; 7 | SEB; 4 | LBH | LGA; 11 | WGL; 11 | MOS | IMS | ELK | VIR | COA | PET; 9 | | 17th | 119 | |
| 2015 | Krohn Racing | P | Ligier JS P2 | Judd HK 3.6 L V8 | DAY; 13 | SEB; 6 | LBH | LGA | DET | WGL | MOS | ELK | COA | PET | | | 20th | 45 | |
| 2016 | Flying Lizard Motorsports | GTD | Audi R8 LMS ultra | Audi 5.2 V10 | DAY; 19† | SEB; 15 | LAG | DET | WGL | MOS | LIM | ROA | VIR | COA | PET | | 57th | 18 | |
| 2017 | CORE Autosport | GTD | Porsche 911 GT3 R | Porsche 4.0 Flat-6 | DAY; 22 | SEB; 16 | LBH | COA | DET | WGL; 13 | MOS | LIM | ROA | VIR | LAG | PET; 5 | 39th | 68 | |
| 2022 | CORE Autosport | LMP3 | Ligier JS P320 | Nissan VK56DE 5.6 L V8 | DAY; 3 | SEB | MDO | WGL | MOS | ELK | PET | | | | | | NC† | 0† | |

^{†} Jönsson did not complete sufficient laps in order to score full points.

^{†} Points only counted towards the Michelin Endurance Cup, and not the overall LMP3 Championship.

== Sources ==
- Svenske Niclas Jönsson letar efter amerikanen som kan vinna Formel 1
- Rydell femma i Le Mans
- Tuff kamp väntar på Le Mans
- Hemmaseger på Le Mans
- Ekström satsar på amerikansk legend

Sporting positions
| Preceded by Jan Nilsson | Swedish Formula Three Champion; 1990–1991 | Succeeded by Peter Åslund |
