= 2006 Rolex Sports Car Series =

7th season of the racing series organized by Grand-Am

Seasons
- ← 2005 2007 →

The 2006 Rolex Sports Car Series season was the seventh season of the Grand-Am Rolex Sports Car Series, and the fifth season under the sponsorship of Rolex.

It began on January 28 with the 24 Hours of Daytona, and ended on September 2 with the Discount Tire Sunchaser at Miller Motorsports Park. The championship was competed with Daytona Prototypes (DP) and Grand Touring (GT) class cars only, for the second successive season.

Starting with the VIR 400, this season saw the introduction of qualifying races to set the field for the main race. Controversially, these races awarded the same points as a main race, despite being set at just 30 minutes (or 50 miles) in length. With no qualifying session, starting positions for a qualifying race were determined by speeds during a previously designated practice session. After just three unsuccessful runnings, the format was discontinued in the aftermath of a major five-car crash at Phoenix International Raceway.

== Schedule ==
The schedule was expanded again to 15 races, although both classes did not compete at every event, with the Daytona Prototypes class remaining at 14 races and the Grand Touring class down to 13 races. The events at California Speedway and Circuit Mont-Tremblant, both on the calendar since 2002, were replaced by a first-time visit to the Long Beach Street Circuit, which hadn't held a major sportscar race since 1991, and the returning Lime Rock Park, which had itself been previously replaced by California Speedway. As a support race for IndyCar, the Long Beach event was exclusive for DP cars and limited to 90 minutes, while the Lime Rock race was exclusive to the GT class.

The second race at Watkins Glen was also limited to the DP class, while the third race was discontinued after just one season, as the IndyCar event it supported was moved to the weekend of the Six Hours event. This race was replaced by Infineon Raceway, which switched from the American Le Mans Series. With the Autódromo Hermanos Rodríguez race moved from its November date to an early March spot, the season finale was held as a 9-hour endurance event at the newly built Miller Motorsports Park. The races at Mid-Ohio, Phoenix and Virginia were also moved from their late-summer and early autumn dates to a very hectic spring portion, with nine events in a span of just 15 weeks.

Rnd		Race	Length	Classes	Circuit	Location	Date
1		(United States) Rolex 24 at Daytona	24 hours	All	Daytona International Speedway	Daytona Beach, Florida	January 28–29
2		Mexico City 250	250 miles	All	Autódromo Hermanos Rodríguez	Mexico City, Mexico	March 4
3		(United States) Linder Komatsu Grand Prix of Miami	250 miles	All	Homestead-Miami Speedway	Homestead, Florida	March 25
4		(United States) Crown Royal Grand American Challenge	90 minutes	DP	Streets of Long Beach	Long Beach, California	April 8
5	QR	(United States) VIR 400	30 minutes	All	Virginia International Raceway	Alton, Virginia	April 22
5	R	(United States) VIR 400	400 km	All	Virginia International Raceway	Alton, Virginia	April 23
6	QR	(United States) U.S. Sportscar Invitational	30 minutes	All	Mazda Raceway Laguna Seca	Monterey, California	May 6
6	R	(United States) U.S. Sportscar Invitational	250 miles	All	Mazda Raceway Laguna Seca	Monterey, California	May 7
7	QR	(United States) GAINSCO Grand Prix	30 minutes	All	Phoenix International Raceway	Avondale, Arizona	May 12
7	R	(United States) GAINSCO Grand Prix	250 miles	All	Phoenix International Raceway	Avondale, Arizona	May 13
8		(United States) Rolex GT Series Challenge	200 miles	GT	Lime Rock Park	Lakeville, Connecticut	May 29
9		(United States) Sahlen's Six Hours of The Glen	6 hours	All	Watkins Glen International	Watkins Glen, New York	June 3
10		(United States) EMCO Gears Classic	250 miles	All	Mid-Ohio Sports Car Course	Lexington, Ohio	June 24
11		(United States) Brumos Porsche 250	250 miles	All	Daytona International Speedway	Daytona Beach, Florida	June 29
12		(United States) Porsche 250	250 miles	All	Barber Motorsports Park	Birmingham, Alabama	July 30
13		(United States) Crown Royal 200 at The Glen	200 miles	DP	Watkins Glen International	Watkins Glen, New York	August 11
14		(United States) Sonoma 250	250 miles	All	Infineon Raceway	Sonoma, California	August 26
15		(United States) Discount Tire Sunchaser	9 hours	All	Miller Motorsports Park	Grantsville, Utah	September 2

== Entries ==
=== Daytona Prototype (DP) ===
Team	Chassis	Engine	No.	Drivers	Rounds
(United States) Howard-Boss Motorsports	Crawford DP03	Pontiac	2	(Netherlands) Jan Lammers	1
(United States) Howard-Boss Motorsports	Crawford DP03	Pontiac	2	(United Kingdom) Allan McNish	1
(United States) Howard-Boss Motorsports	Crawford DP03	Pontiac	2	(United States) Danica Patrick	1
(United States) Howard-Boss Motorsports	Crawford DP03	Pontiac	2	(United States) Rusty Wallace	1
(United States) Howard-Boss Motorsports	Crawford DP03	Pontiac	4	(United States) Butch Leitzinger	All
(United States) Howard-Boss Motorsports	Crawford DP03	Pontiac	4	(United Kingdom) Andy Wallace	All
(United States) Howard-Boss Motorsports	Crawford DP03	Pontiac	4	(United States) Tony Stewart	1
(United States) Howard-Boss Motorsports	Crawford DP03	Pontiac	16	(United States) Chris Dyson	1, 3, 5, 9, 11, 13
(United States) Howard-Boss Motorsports	Crawford DP03	Pontiac	16	(United Kingdom) Guy Smith	1, 3, 5, 9, 11
(United States) Howard-Boss Motorsports	Crawford DP03	Pontiac	16	(United States) Rob Dyson	1, 9, 13
(United States) Howard-Boss Motorsports	Crawford DP03	Pontiac	16	(United Kingdom) Oliver Gavin	1
(United States) Southard Motorsports	Riley MkXI	BMW	3	(United States) Shane Lewis	All
(United States) Southard Motorsports	Riley MkXI	BMW	3	(United States) Craig Stanton	5–7, 9–15
(United States) Southard Motorsports	Riley MkXI	BMW	3	(United States) Randy LaJoie	1–2
(United States) Southard Motorsports	Riley MkXI	BMW	3	(Canada) Tony Burgess	1
(United States) Southard Motorsports	Riley MkXI	BMW	3	(United States) Kris Szekeres	1
(United States) Southard Motorsports	Riley MkXI	BMW	3	(United States) John Pew	3
(United States) Southard Motorsports	Riley MkXI	BMW	3	(United States) Bill Auberlen	4
(United States) Essex Racing	Crawford DP03	Ford	5	(United States) James Gue	1–2
(United States) Essex Racing	Crawford DP03	Ford	5	(United States) Duncan Dayton	1
(United States) Essex Racing	Crawford DP03	Ford	5	(United States) Brian DeVries	1
(United States) Essex Racing	Crawford DP03	Ford	5	(United States) Rick Knoop	1
(United States) Essex Racing	Crawford DP03	Ford	5	(United States) Jim Matthews	1
(United States) Essex Racing	Crawford DP03	Ford	5	(Canada) Scott Maxwell	2
(United States) Finlay Motorsports (United States) Essex/Finlay Motorsports	Crawford DP03	Ford	5	(United States) Rob Finlay	All
(United States) Finlay Motorsports (United States) Essex/Finlay Motorsports	Crawford DP03	Ford	5	(Canada) Michael Valiante	All
(United States) Finlay Motorsports (United States) Essex/Finlay Motorsports	Crawford DP03	Ford	5	(United States) Bryan Herta	1
(United States) Finlay Motorsports (United States) Essex/Finlay Motorsports	Crawford DP03	Ford	5	(United States) Buddy Rice	1
(United States) Finlay Motorsports (United States) Essex/Finlay Motorsports	Crawford DP03	Ford	5	(United States) Guy Cosmo	9
(United States) Finlay Motorsports (United States) Essex/Finlay Motorsports	Crawford DP03	Ford	5	(United States) Dane Cameron	15
(United States) Playboy/Uniden Racing	Crawford DP03	Ford	19	(United States) Michael McDowell	1–7, 9–13, 15
(United States) Playboy/Uniden Racing	Crawford DP03	Ford	19	(United States) Memo Gidley	1–4, 9–15
(United States) Playboy/Uniden Racing	Crawford DP03	Ford	19	(United States) Guy Cosmo	5–7, 14–15
(United States) Playboy/Uniden Racing	Crawford DP03	Ford	19	(United States) Alex Barron	1, 4
(United States) Graydon Elliott Fusion Racing w/ Shank (United States) Michael Shank Racing/Mears Motor Coach (United States) Playboy Racing/Mears-Lexus/Riley	Riley MkXI	Lexus	6	(United States) Mike Borkowski	All
(United States) Graydon Elliott Fusion Racing w/ Shank (United States) Michael Shank Racing/Mears Motor Coach (United States) Playboy Racing/Mears-Lexus/Riley	Riley MkXI	Lexus	6	(Canada) Paul Tracy	1–2, 11
(United States) Graydon Elliott Fusion Racing w/ Shank (United States) Michael Shank Racing/Mears Motor Coach (United States) Playboy Racing/Mears-Lexus/Riley	Riley MkXI	Lexus	6	(United States) Paul Mears Jr.	1, 5, 9
(United States) Graydon Elliott Fusion Racing w/ Shank (United States) Michael Shank Racing/Mears Motor Coach (United States) Playboy Racing/Mears-Lexus/Riley	Riley MkXI	Lexus	6	(United States) Tommy Constantine	9–10, 12
(United States) Graydon Elliott Fusion Racing w/ Shank (United States) Michael Shank Racing/Mears Motor Coach (United States) Playboy Racing/Mears-Lexus/Riley	Riley MkXI	Lexus	6	(Canada) Kenny Wilden	1, 3
(United States) Graydon Elliott Fusion Racing w/ Shank (United States) Michael Shank Racing/Mears Motor Coach (United States) Playboy Racing/Mears-Lexus/Riley	Riley MkXI	Lexus	6	(Canada) Antoine Bessette	6–7
(United States) Graydon Elliott Fusion Racing w/ Shank (United States) Michael Shank Racing/Mears Motor Coach (United States) Playboy Racing/Mears-Lexus/Riley	Riley MkXI	Lexus	6	(United States) Burt Frisselle	13, 15
(United States) Graydon Elliott Fusion Racing w/ Shank (United States) Michael Shank Racing/Mears Motor Coach (United States) Playboy Racing/Mears-Lexus/Riley	Riley MkXI	Lexus	6	(United States) Brian Frisselle	14–15
(United States) Graydon Elliott Fusion Racing w/ Shank (United States) Michael Shank Racing/Mears Motor Coach (United States) Playboy Racing/Mears-Lexus/Riley	Riley MkXI	Lexus	6	(United States) Cort Wagner	4
(United States) Michael Shank Racing	Riley MkXI	Lexus Pontiac (round 2)	60	(Brazil) Oswaldo Negri Jr.	All
(United States) Michael Shank Racing	Riley MkXI	Lexus Pontiac (round 2)	60	(South Africa) Mark Patterson	All
(United States) Michael Shank Racing	Riley MkXI	Lexus Pontiac (round 2)	60	(United States) A. J. Allmendinger	1
(United States) Michael Shank Racing	Riley MkXI	Lexus Pontiac (round 2)	60	(United Kingdom) Justin Wilson	1
(United States) Michael Shank Racing	Riley MkXI	Lexus Pontiac (round 2)	60	(United Kingdom) Rod MacLeod	7
(United States) Tuttle Team Racing / SAMAX (United States) Tuttle Team Racing with BAM (United States) Tuttle Team Racing	Riley MkXI	BMW (1–3, 5–6); Pontiac	7	(United States) Brian Tuttle	All
(United States) Tuttle Team Racing / SAMAX (United States) Tuttle Team Racing with BAM (United States) Tuttle Team Racing	Riley MkXI	BMW (1–3, 5–6); Pontiac	7	(France) Jonathan Cochet	2–7, 10, 13–15
(United States) Tuttle Team Racing / SAMAX (United States) Tuttle Team Racing with BAM (United States) Tuttle Team Racing	Riley MkXI	BMW (1–3, 5–6); Pontiac	7	(United Kingdom) Rod MacLeod	9, 11, 15
(United States) Tuttle Team Racing / SAMAX (United States) Tuttle Team Racing with BAM (United States) Tuttle Team Racing	Riley MkXI	BMW (1–3, 5–6); Pontiac	7	(United States) Kyle Petty	1
(United States) Tuttle Team Racing / SAMAX (United States) Tuttle Team Racing with BAM (United States) Tuttle Team Racing	Riley MkXI	BMW (1–3, 5–6); Pontiac	7	(United States) Boris Said	1
(United States) CITGO Racing by SAMAX	Riley MkXI	Pontiac	11	(Venezuela) Milka Duno	All
(United States) CITGO Racing by SAMAX	Riley MkXI	Pontiac	11	(United Kingdom) Marino Franchitti	1–5
(United States) CITGO Racing by SAMAX	Riley MkXI	Pontiac	11	(Belgium) Marc Goossens	6, 9, 15
(United States) CITGO Racing by SAMAX	Riley MkXI	Pontiac	11	(Monaco) Olivier Beretta	7, 10, 12
(United States) CITGO Racing by SAMAX	Riley MkXI	Pontiac	11	(Sweden) Stefan Johansson	9, 11, 15
(United States) CITGO Racing by SAMAX	Riley MkXI	Pontiac	11	(United Kingdom) Dario Franchitti	1
(United States) CITGO Racing by SAMAX	Riley MkXI	Pontiac	11	(United Kingdom) Kevin McGarrity	1
(United States) CITGO Racing by SAMAX	Riley MkXI	Pontiac	11	(United Kingdom) Ian James	7
(United States) CITGO Racing by SAMAX	Riley MkXI	Pontiac	11	(Portugal) João Barbosa	13
(United States) CITGO Racing by SAMAX	Riley MkXI	Pontiac	11	(Canada) Patrick Carpentier	14
(United States) Synergy Racing	Doran JE4	Porsche	8	(United States) Brian Frisselle	1–7, 9–10
(United States) Synergy Racing	Doran JE4	Porsche	8	(United States) Burt Frisselle	1–7, 9–10
(United States) Synergy Racing	Doran JE4	Porsche	8	(Netherlands) Patrick Huisman	1, 13–15
(United States) Synergy Racing	Doran JE4	Porsche	8	(United States) Boris Said	12–13
(United States) Synergy Racing	Doran JE4	Porsche	8	(United States) Clint Field	1
(United States) Synergy Racing	Doran JE4	Porsche	8	(United States) Al Unser Jr.	9
(United States) Synergy Racing	Doran JE4	Porsche	8	(United States) Brian Cunningham	12
(United States) Synergy Racing	Doran JE4	Porsche	8	(United States) Spencer Pumpelly	14
(United States) Synergy Racing	Doran JE4	Porsche	8	(United States) David Russell	15
(United States) Suntrust Racing	Riley MkXI	Pontiac	10	(Italy) Max Angelelli	All
(United States) Suntrust Racing	Riley MkXI	Pontiac	10	(South Africa) Wayne Taylor	1–3, 5, 9–11, 15
(United States) Suntrust Racing	Riley MkXI	Pontiac	10	(Denmark) Jan Magnussen	4, 6–7, 10, 12, 14
(United States) Suntrust Racing	Riley MkXI	Pontiac	10	(Australia) Ryan Briscoe	1, 9, 13
(United States) Suntrust Racing	Riley MkXI	Pontiac	10	(France) Emmanuel Collard	1
(United States) Suntrust Racing	Riley MkXI	Pontiac	10	(United States) Ryan Hunter-Reay	15
(Mexico) Lowe's Fernández Racing	Riley MkXI	Pontiac	12	(Mexico) Adrián Fernández	All
(Mexico) Lowe's Fernández Racing	Riley MkXI	Pontiac	12	(Brazil) Mário Haberfeld	All
(Mexico) Lowe's Fernández Racing	Riley MkXI	Pontiac	12	(United States) Scott Sharp	1
(Mexico) Lowe's Fernández Racing	Riley MkXI	Pontiac	12	(Brazil) Vítor Meira	15
(United States) Alex Job Racing/Emory Motorsports	Crawford DP03	Porsche	23	(Germany) Mike Rockenfeller	1, 3–7, 9–15
(United States) Alex Job Racing/Emory Motorsports	Crawford DP03	Porsche	23	(United States) Patrick Long	1, 3–7, 9–14
(United States) Alex Job Racing/Emory Motorsports	Crawford DP03	Porsche	23	(Germany) Lucas Luhr	1
(United States) Alex Job Racing/Emory Motorsports	Crawford DP03	Porsche	23	(Germany) Marcel Tiemann	7
(United States) Alex Job Racing/Emory Motorsports	Crawford DP03	Porsche	23	(United States) Terry Borcheller	15
(United States) Alex Job Racing/Emory Motorsports	Crawford DP03	Porsche	23	(Germany) Ralf Kelleners	15
(United States) Sigalsport BMW	Riley MkXI	BMW	30	(United States) Matthew Alhadeff	10–15
(United States) Sigalsport BMW	Riley MkXI	BMW	30	(United States) Bill Auberlen	10–15
(United States) Sigalsport BMW	Riley MkXI	BMW	30	(United States) Rocky Moran Jr.	15
(United States) Team Cytosport	Riley MkXI	Pontiac	31	(United States) Greg Pickett	6, 14
(United States) Team Cytosport	Riley MkXI	Pontiac	31	(United States) Scott Sharp	6, 14
(United States) ADI Motorsports	Picchio DP2	BMW	33	(United States) Shawn Bayliff	3–5
(United States) ADI Motorsports	Picchio DP2	BMW	33	(United States) Tim Hubman	3–4
(United States) ADI Motorsports	Picchio DP2	BMW	33	(United States) Peter Argetsinger	5
(United States) Cheever Racing (United States) Crown Royal Special Reserve/Cheever	Crawford DP03	Lexus (round 1); Porsche	39	(Brazil) Christian Fittipaldi	All
(United States) Cheever Racing (United States) Crown Royal Special Reserve/Cheever	Crawford DP03	Lexus (round 1); Porsche	39	(United States) Eddie Cheever	1–2, 4–6, 11, 15
(United States) Cheever Racing (United States) Crown Royal Special Reserve/Cheever	Crawford DP03	Lexus (round 1); Porsche	39	(Brazil) Hoover Orsi	9–10, 14–15
(United States) Cheever Racing (United States) Crown Royal Special Reserve/Cheever	Crawford DP03	Lexus (round 1); Porsche	39	(Canada) Patrick Carpentier	1
(United States) Cheever Racing (United States) Crown Royal Special Reserve/Cheever	Crawford DP03	Lexus (round 1); Porsche	39	(Germany) Lucas Luhr	3
(United States) Cheever Racing (United States) Crown Royal Special Reserve/Cheever	Crawford DP03	Lexus (round 1); Porsche	39	(Sweden) Stefan Johansson	7
(United States) Cheever Racing (United States) Crown Royal Special Reserve/Cheever	Crawford DP03	Lexus (round 1); Porsche	39	(Italy) Max Papis	12
(United States) Cheever Racing (United States) Crown Royal Special Reserve/Cheever	Crawford DP03	Lexus (round 1); Porsche	39	(Brazil) Thomas Erdos	13
(United States) Cheever Racing (United States) Crown Royal Special Reserve/Cheever	Crawford DP03	Lexus	51	(Brazil) Thomas Erdos	1
(United States) Cheever Racing (United States) Crown Royal Special Reserve/Cheever	Crawford DP03	Lexus	51	(United Kingdom) Warren Hughes	1
(United States) Cheever Racing (United States) Crown Royal Special Reserve/Cheever	Crawford DP03	Lexus	51	(Sweden) Stefan Johansson	1
(United States) Derhaag Motorsports	Riley MkXI	Pontiac	40	(United States) Randy Ruhlman	All
(United States) Derhaag Motorsports	Riley MkXI	Pontiac	40	(United States) Chris Bingham	1–2, 4–7, 10–11
(United States) Derhaag Motorsports	Riley MkXI	Pontiac	40	(United Kingdom) Justin Bell	1, 3, 15
(United States) Derhaag Motorsports	Riley MkXI	Pontiac	40	(Canada) Ron Fellows	1, 14
(United States) Derhaag Motorsports	Riley MkXI	Pontiac	40	(United States) Paul Dallenbach	13, 15
(United States) Derhaag Motorsports	Riley MkXI	Pontiac	40	(Canada) Hugo Guenette	9
(United States) Derhaag Motorsports	Riley MkXI	Pontiac	40	(France) Jonathan Cochet	12
(United States) TruSpeed Motorsports	Riley MkXI	Porsche	47	(United States) Rob Morgan	3–4, 6, 10, 12, 15
(United States) TruSpeed Motorsports	Riley MkXI	Porsche	47	(United States) Charles Morgan	3–4, 6, 10, 15
(United States) TruSpeed Motorsports	Riley MkXI	Porsche	47	(United States) B. J. Zacharias	12, 15
(United States) Blackforest Motorsports	Crawford DP03	Ford	50	(United States) Chris Gleason	1
(United States) Blackforest Motorsports	Crawford DP03	Ford	50	(United Kingdom) Ian James	1
(United States) Blackforest Motorsports	Crawford DP03	Ford	50	(United States) Tom Nastasi	1
(United States) Blackforest Motorsports	Crawford DP03	Ford	50	(United States) Henri Zogaib	1
(United States) Rocketsports Racing	Crawford DP03	Ford	50	(United States) Tomy Drissi	2–4, 6, 10, 13–14
(United States) Rocketsports Racing	Crawford DP03	Ford	50	(United States) Paul Gentilozzi	2–4, 6, 10
(United States) Rocketsports Racing	Crawford DP03	Ford	50	(Estonia) Tõnis Kasemets	13–14
(United States) Red Bull/Brumos Porsche	Fabcar FDSC/03; Riley MkXI (12–15)	Porsche	58	(United States) David Donohue	All
(United States) Red Bull/Brumos Porsche	Fabcar FDSC/03; Riley MkXI (12–15)	Porsche	58	(United States) Darren Law	All
(United States) Red Bull/Brumos Porsche	Fabcar FDSC/03; Riley MkXI (12–15)	Porsche	58	(Germany) Sascha Maassen	1
(United States) Red Bull/Brumos Porsche	Fabcar FDSC/03; Riley MkXI (12–15)	Porsche	58	(United States) Buddy Rice	15
(United States) Brumos Racing	Fabcar FDSC/03	Porsche	59	(United States) Hurley Haywood	All
(United States) Brumos Racing	Fabcar FDSC/03	Porsche	59	(United States) J. C. France	1–2, 4–7, 9–15
(United States) Brumos Racing	Fabcar FDSC/03	Porsche	59	(United States) Ted Christopher	1, 9
(United States) Brumos Racing	Fabcar FDSC/03	Porsche	59	(Brazil) Roberto Moreno	3, 15
(United States) Brumos Racing	Fabcar FDSC/03	Porsche	59	(Portugal) João Barbosa	1
(Canada) AIM Autosport	Riley MkXI	Lexus	61	(Canada) James Hinchcliffe	11
(Canada) AIM Autosport	Riley MkXI	Lexus	61	(Canada) Mark Wilkins	11
(United States) Krohn Racing	Riley MkXI	Pontiac (round 1); Ford	75	(United States) Tracy Krohn	All
(United States) Krohn Racing	Riley MkXI	Pontiac (round 1); Ford	75	(Sweden) Niclas Jönsson	1–7, 9–13
(United States) Krohn Racing	Riley MkXI	Pontiac (round 1); Ford	75	(United States) Boris Said	14–15
(United States) Krohn Racing	Riley MkXI	Pontiac (round 1); Ford	75	(Germany) Jörg Bergmeister	1
(United States) Krohn Racing	Riley MkXI	Pontiac (round 1); Ford	75	(United States) Colin Braun	1
(United States) Krohn Racing	Riley MkXI	Pontiac (round 1); Ford	75	(Italy) Max Papis	15
(United States) Krohn Racing	Riley MkXI	Ford	76	(Germany) Jörg Bergmeister	2–7, 9–15
(United States) Krohn Racing	Riley MkXI	Ford	76	(United States) Colin Braun	2, 4–7, 10–13, 15
(United States) Krohn Racing	Riley MkXI	Ford	76	(Sweden) Niclas Jönsson	14–15
(United States) Krohn Racing	Riley MkXI	Ford	76	(Italy) Max Papis	3
(United States) Krohn Racing	Riley MkXI	Ford	76	(United States) Boris Said	9
(United States) Feeds The Need/Doran Racing	Doran JE4	Ford	77	(United States) Harrison Brix	All
(United States) Feeds The Need/Doran Racing	Doran JE4	Ford	77	(United States) Terry Borcheller	1–7, 9–13
(United States) Feeds The Need/Doran Racing	Doran JE4	Ford	77	(Mexico) Michel Jourdain Jr.	1, 14–15
(United States) Feeds The Need/Doran Racing	Doran JE4	Ford	77	(United States) Forest Barber	1
(United States) Feeds The Need/Doran Racing	Doran JE4	Ford	77	(Spain) Oriol Servià	15
(United States) Doran Racing (United States) Doran/Pegasus Racing	Doran JE4	Ford	78	(United States) B. J. Zacharias	1, 9
(United States) Doran Racing (United States) Doran/Pegasus Racing	Doran JE4	Ford	78	(Germany) Oliver Kuttner	9, 15
(United States) Doran Racing (United States) Doran/Pegasus Racing	Doran JE4	Ford	78	(Brazil) Raul Boesel	1
(United States) Doran Racing (United States) Doran/Pegasus Racing	Doran JE4	Ford	78	(France) Sébastien Bourdais	1
(United States) Doran Racing (United States) Doran/Pegasus Racing	Doran JE4	Ford	78	(United States) Tony Ave	15
(United States) Doran Racing (United States) Doran/Pegasus Racing	Doran JE4	Ford	78	(United States) James Gue	15
(United States) Robinson Racing	Riley MkXI	Pontiac	84	(United States) Darin Brassfield	1
(United States) Robinson Racing	Riley MkXI	Pontiac	84	(United States) Paul Dallenbach	1
(United States) Robinson Racing	Riley MkXI	Pontiac	84	(United States) Wally Dallenbach Jr.	1
(United States) Robinson Racing	Riley MkXI	Pontiac	84	(United States) George Robinson	1
(United States) Pacific Coast Motorsports	Riley MkXI	Pontiac	89	(United Kingdom) Ryan Dalziel	All
(United States) Pacific Coast Motorsports	Riley MkXI	Pontiac	89	(United States) Alex Figge	All
(United States) Pacific Coast Motorsports	Riley MkXI	Pontiac	89	(Canada) David Empringham	1, 15
(United States) Pacific Coast Motorsports	Riley MkXI	Pontiac	89	(United States) Jon Fogarty	1
(United States) CyberSpeed Racing	Riley MkXI	Pontiac	97	(United States) Tony Ave	3, 5–6, 10–12
(United States) CyberSpeed Racing	Riley MkXI	Pontiac	97	(United States) Skip Cummins	3, 5–6, 10–12
(United States) Gainsco/Blackhawk Racing	Riley MkXI	Pontiac	99	(United States) Alex Gurney	All
(United States) Gainsco/Blackhawk Racing	Riley MkXI	Pontiac	99	(United States) Jon Fogarty	5–7, 9–15
(United States) Gainsco/Blackhawk Racing	Riley MkXI	Pontiac	99	(United States) Jimmy Vasser	1, 3, 15
(United States) Gainsco/Blackhawk Racing	Riley MkXI	Pontiac	99	(United States) Bob Stallings	1–2
(United States) Gainsco/Blackhawk Racing	Riley MkXI	Pontiac	99	(United States) Rocky Moran Jr.	1, 4
(United States) CompUSA Chip Ganassi with Felix Sabates	Riley MkXI	Lexus	01	(Mexico) Luis Díaz	All
(United States) CompUSA Chip Ganassi with Felix Sabates	Riley MkXI	Lexus	01	(United States) Scott Pruett	All
(United States) CompUSA Chip Ganassi with Felix Sabates	Riley MkXI	Lexus	01	(Italy) Max Papis	1
(United States) CompUSA Chip Ganassi with Felix Sabates	Riley MkXI	Lexus	01	(New Zealand) Scott Dixon	15
(United States) Target Chip Ganassi with Felix Sabates	Riley MkXI	Lexus	02	(New Zealand) Scott Dixon	1
(United States) Target Chip Ganassi with Felix Sabates	Riley MkXI	Lexus	02	(United States) Casey Mears	1
(United States) Target Chip Ganassi with Felix Sabates	Riley MkXI	Lexus	02	(United Kingdom) Dan Wheldon	1
(United States) Spirit of Daytona Racing	Crawford DP03	Pontiac	07	(United States) Guy Cosmo	11
(United States) Spirit of Daytona Racing	Crawford DP03	Pontiac	07	(United States) Bobby Labonte	11
(United States) Spirit of Daytona Racing	Crawford DP03	Pontiac	09	(United States) Doug Goad	1–7, 9–11, 15
(United States) Spirit of Daytona Racing	Crawford DP03	Pontiac	09	(United States) Larry Oberto	1–7
(United States) Spirit of Daytona Racing	Crawford DP03	Pontiac	09	(United States) Bobby Labonte	1, 12–13
(United States) Spirit of Daytona Racing	Crawford DP03	Pontiac	09	(Canada) Marc-Antoine Camirand	10–11, 15
(United States) Spirit of Daytona Racing	Crawford DP03	Pontiac	09	(France) Stéphan Grégoire	9, 15
(United States) Spirit of Daytona Racing	Crawford DP03	Pontiac	09	(United States) Guy Cosmo	12–13
(United States) Spirit of Daytona Racing	Crawford DP03	Pontiac	09	(Switzerland) Harold Primat	1

== Race results ==
Overall winners in bold.

Rnd	Circuit	DP Winning Team	GT Winning Team	Results
Rnd	Circuit	DP Winning Drivers	GT Winning Drivers	Results
1	Daytona	**(United States) #02 Target Chip Ganassi with Felix Sabates**	(United States) #36 TPC Racing	Results
1	Daytona	(United States) Casey Mears (United Kingdom) Dan Wheldon (New Zealand) Scott Dixon	(United States) Randy Pobst (United States) Ian Baas (United States) Spencer Pumpelly (United States) Michael Levitas	Results
2	Mexico City	**(United States) #01 CompUSA Chip Ganassi with Felix Sabates**	(United States) #64 The Racer's Group	Results
2	Mexico City	(United States) Scott Pruett (Mexico) Luis Diaz	(United States) Kelly Collins (United States) Paul Edwards	Results
3	Homestead	**(United States) #23 Alex Job Racing/Emory Motorsports**	(United States) #64 The Racer's Group	Results
3	Homestead	(Germany) Mike Rockenfeller (United States) Patrick Long	(United States) Kelly Collins (United States) Paul Edwards	Results
4	Long Beach	**(United States) #01 CompUSA Chip Ganassi with Felix Sabates**	did not participate	Results
4	Long Beach	(United States) Scott Pruett (Mexico) Luis Diaz	did not participate	Results
5	Virginia	**(United States) #23 Alex Job Racing/Emory Motorsports**	(United States) #65 The Racer's Group	Results
5	Virginia	(Germany) Mike Rockenfeller (United States) Patrick Long	(United States) Andy Lally (United States) R.J. Valentine (United States) Marc Bunting	Results
6	Laguna Seca	(United States) #10 SunTrust Racing	(United States) #72 Tafel Racing	Results
6	Laguna Seca	(Italy) Max Angelelli (Denmark) Jan Magnussen	(Germany) Wolf Henzler (United Kingdom) Robin Liddell	Results
7	Phoenix	**(United States) #01 CompUSA Chip Ganassi with Felix Sabates**	(United States) #64 The Racer's Group	Results
7	Phoenix	(United States) Scott Pruett (Mexico) Luis Diaz	(United States) Kelly Collins (United States) Paul Edwards	Results
8	Lime Rock	did not participate	(United States) #65 The Racer's Group	Results
8	Lime Rock	did not participate	(United States) Andy Lally (United States) R.J. Valentine (United States) Marc Bunting	Results
9	Watkins Glen	**(United States) #76 Krohn Racing**	(United States) #72 Tafel Racing	Results
9	Watkins Glen	(United States) Boris Said (Germany) Jörg Bergmeister	(Germany) Wolf Henzler (United Kingdom) Robin Liddell	Results
10	Mid-Ohio	**(Mexico) #12 Lowe's Fernández Racing**	(United States) #72 Tafel Racing	Results
10	Mid-Ohio	(Mexico) Adrian Fernández (Brazil) Mário Haberfeld	(Germany) Wolf Henzler (United Kingdom) Robin Liddell	Results
11	Daytona	**(United States) #76 Krohn Racing**	(United States) #65 The Racer's Group	Results
11	Daytona	(Germany) Jörg Bergmeister (United States) Colin Braun	(United States) Andy Lally (United States) R.J. Valentine (United States) Marc Bunting	Results
12	Barber	**(United States) #76 Krohn Racing**	(United States) #65 The Racer's Group	Results
12	Barber	(Germany) Jörg Bergmeister (United States) Colin Braun	(United States) Andy Lally (United States) R.J. Valentine (United States) Marc Bunting	Results
13	Watkins Glen	**(United States) #01 CompUSA Chip Ganassi with Felix Sabates**	did not participate	Results
13	Watkins Glen	(United States) Scott Pruett (Mexico) Luis Diaz	did not participate	Results
14	Infineon	**(United States) #01 CompUSA Chip Ganassi with Felix Sabates**	(United States) #72 Tafel Racing	Results
14	Infineon	(United States) Scott Pruett (Mexico) Luis Diaz	(Germany) Wolf Henzler (United Kingdom) Robin Liddell	Results
15	Miller	**(United States) #60 Michael Shank Racing**	(United States) #65 The Racer's Group	Results
15	Miller	(South Africa) Mark Patterson (Brazil) Oswaldo Negri	(United States) Andy Lally (United States) Marc Bunting (United States) Spencer Pumpelly (United States) Paul Edwards	Results

== Championship standings ==
Championship points are awarded in each class at the finish of each event, including the qualifying races. Points are awarded based on finishing positions in the race as shown in the chart below.

Position	1	2	3	4	5	6	7	8	9	10	11	12	13	14	15	16	17	18	19	20	21	22	23	24	25	26	27	28	29	30+
Points	35	32	30	28	26	25	24	23	22	21	20	19	18	17	16	15	14	13	12	11	10	9	8	7	6	5	4	3	2	1

=== Drivers' Championship ===
==== Standings: Daytona Prototypes (DP) ====
Pos.	Drivers	DAY	MEX	HMS	LBH	VIR		LGA		PHX		WGL	MDO	DAY	BAR	WGL	SON	UTA	Points
Pos.	Drivers	DAY	MEX	HMS	LBH	QR	R	QR	R	QR	R	WGL	MDO	DAY	BAR	WGL	SON	UTA	Points
1	(Germany) Jörg Bergmeister	5	2	8	7	4	5	12	3	7	7	1	2	1	1	9	9	6	462
2	(United States) Scott Pruett (Mexico) Luis Díaz	20	1	3	1	22	3	6	10	2	1	7	21	3	10	1	1	4	446
3	(Italy) Max Angelelli	29	9	11	8	11	2	5	1	4	4	3	4	4	2	2	4	14	431
4	(United States) Colin Braun	5	2		7	4	5	12	3	7	7		2	1	1	9		6	382
5	(Germany) Mike Rockenfeller	3		1	2	2	1	1	24	19	20	15	20	2	3	3	20	10	380
6	(South Africa) Mark Patterson	2	19	22	5	6	13	2	11	17	16	4	7	10	9	4	13	1	379
7	(United States) Michael McDowell	6	8	4	21	1	4	4	4	6	6	6	24	8	6	21		2	377
8	(Brazil) Oswaldo Negri Jr.	2	19	22	5	6	13	2	11	17	EX	4	7	10	9	4	13	1	364
9	(United States) Rob Finlay (Canada) Michael Valiante	9	17	5	6	3	9	8	8	8	9	12	10	7	22	5	6	23	362
10	(United States) Patrick Long	3		1	2	2	1	1	24	19	20	15	20	2	3	3	20		359
11	(United States) Alex Gurney	13	13	6	(25)	19	14	7	2	3	8	2	3	5	4	13	(25)	9	355
12	(United States) Butch Leitzinger (United Kingdom) Andy Wallace	15	4	24	4	9	6	9	6	21	15	5	5	24	23	18	2	3	341
13	(Brazil) Mário Haberfeld	26	7	14	11	13	8	13	15	1	5	22	1	17	5	25	3	21	332
14	(United States) Darren Law (United States) David Donohue	4	15	10	15	8	12	22	5	22	12	17	8	12	13	6	8	7	332
15	(Mexico) Adrián Fernández	26	7	14	11	13	8	13	15	1	5	22	1	17	5	(25)	3	21	326
16	(United Kingdom) Ryan Dalziel (United States) Alex Figge	23	11	13	16	12	24	3	16	10	2	10	6	16	20	8	5	13	324
17	(United States) Mike Borkowski	27	3	18	9	10	23	10	13	5	(23)	14	9	6	7	10	11	5	318
18	(Brazil) Christian Fittipaldi	11	6	2	24	5	7	26	27	20	10	13	19	9	8	7	12	11	313
19	(United States) Jon Fogarty	23				19	14	7	2	3	8	2	3	5	4	13	25	9	308
20	(United States) Harrison Brix	7	5	19	22	7	19	14	9	9	21	8	13	25	15	23	16	8	287
21	(United States) Guy Cosmo					1	4	4	4	6	6	12		15	21	17	10	2	281
22	(Sweden) Niclas Jönsson	5	14	16	12	23	17	15	22	16	14	16	15	23	12	12	9	6	280
23	(Venezuela) Milka Duno	8	16	23	18	20	11	11	7	12	11	11	18	26	17	19	7	16	276
24	(United States) Terry Borcheller	7	5	19	22	7	19	14	9	9	21	8	13	25	15	23		10	270
25	(United States) Tracy Krohn	5	14	16	12	23	17	15	22	16	14	16	15	23	12	12	18	12	265
26	(United States) Shane Lewis	(19)	24	21	3	24	15	17	12	13	3	21	17	11	11	11	22	18	257
27	(United States) Hurley Haywood	18	22	12	14	18	16	18	18	15	18	23	11	19	16	15	19	22	233
28	(Denmark) Jan Magnussen				8			5	1	4	4		4		2		4		228
29	(United States) Randy Ruhlman	14	23	17	10	15	18	19	19	23	13	18	12	14	(25)	16	14	(25)	220
30	(United States) Memo Gidley	6	8	4	Wth							6	24	8	6	21	10	2	219
31	(United States) J. C. France	18	22		14	18	16	18	18	15	18	23	11	19	16	15	19	22	214
32	(United States) Craig Stanton					24	15	17	12	13	3	21	17	11	11	11	22	18	210
33	(South Africa) Wayne Taylor	29	9	11		11	2					3	4	4				14	199
34	(United States) Brian Frisselle	25	10	27	26	14	25	27	17	18	22	9	22				11	5	176
35	(United States) Brian Tuttle	21	21	26	17	21	21	16	26	11	19	19	27	22	19	26	21	20	174
36	(United States) Burt Frisselle	25	10	27	26	14	25	27	17	18	22	9	22			10		5	171
37	(United States) Doug Goad	17	18	20	19	16	22	24	14	14	17	24	25	18				17	169
38	(United States) Chris Bingham	14	23		10	15	18	19	19	23	13		12	14					161
39	(United States) Eddie Cheever	11	6		24	5	7	26	27					9				11	153
40	(United States) Larry Oberto	17	18	20	19	16	22	24	14	14	17								129
41	(France) Jonathan Cochet		21	26	17	21	(21)	16	(26)	11	19		(27)		25	(26)	21	20	113
42	(United States) Rob Morgan			9	13			21	20				16		18			15	105
43	(United States) Chris Dyson	10		7		DNS	10					(25)		13		20			95
44	(United States) Boris Said	21										1			24	22	18	12	93
45	(United States) Charles Morgan			9	13			21	20				16					15	92
46	(United Kingdom) Marino Franchitti	8	16	23	18	20	11												90
47	(United States) Bill Auberlen				3								23	(27)	14	14	24	24	86
48	(Sweden) Stefan Johansson	12								20	10	11		(26)				16	86
49	(United Kingdom) Guy Smith	10		7		DNS	10					(25)		13					84
50	(Belgium) Marc Goossens							11	7			11						16	79
51	(Italy) Max Papis	20		8											8			12	76
52	(United States) Tony Ave			15		17	(26)	23	23				26	20	DNS			19	74
53	(Canada) Antoine Bessette							10	13	5	23								73
54	(United States) Skip Cummins			15		17	26	23	23				26	20	DNS				67
55	(Monaco) Olivier Beretta									12	11		18		17				66
56	(United States) Jimmy Vasser	13		6														9	65
57	(United States) Tomy Drissi		20	25	20			25	25				14			(24)	23		65
58	(New Zealand) Scott Dixon	1																4	63
59	(United States) Tommy Constantine											14	9		7				63
60	(Germany) Lucas Luhr	3		2															62
61	(Australia) Ryan Briscoe	(29)										3				2			62
62	(Mexico) Michel Jourdain Jr.	7															16	8	62
63	(Canada) Paul Tracy	27	3											6					59
64	(United States) Paul Gentilozzi		20	25	20			25	25				14						57
65	(United States) Bobby Labonte	17												15	21	17			54
66	(United States) Matthew Alhadeff												23	27	14	14	24	(24)	53
67	(United States) Paul Mears Jr.	27				10	23					14							50
68	(Brazil) Hoover Orsi											13	19				(12)	11	50
69	(United Kingdom) Rod MacLeod										16	19		22				20	47
70	(United States) Buddy Rice	9																7	46
71	(Canada) Patrick Carpentier	11															7		44
72	(Brazil) Thomas Erdos	12														7			43
73	(United States) B. J. Zacharias	28										20			18			15	43
74	(United States) Scott Sharp	26						20	21								17		40
75	(United States) Rob Dyson	10										25				20			38
76	(United States) Bob Stallings	13	13																36
77	(United Kingdom) Dan Wheldon (United States) Casey Mears	1																	35
78	(United States) Alex Barron	6			21														35
79	(United States) Greg Pickett							20	21								17		35
80	(Canada) Ron Fellows	14															14		34
81	(Canada) Marc-Antoine Camirand												25	18				17	33
82	(United Kingdom) Justin Wilson (United States) A. J. Allmendinger	2																	32
83	(United States) James Gue	PO	12															19	32
=	(United Kingdom) Justin Bell	14		17														(25)	31
=	(Netherlands) Patrick Huisman	25														22	15	(26)	31
84	(United States) Paul Dallenbach	22														16		25	30
85	(Germany) Sascha Maassen	4																	28
86	(Brazil) Roberto Moreno			12														22	28
87	(Canada) David Empringham	23																13	26
88	(Portugal) João Barbosa	18														19			25
89	(United States) Forest Barber	7																	24
90	(United States) Rocky Moran Jr.	13			25													(24)	24
91	(United Kingdom) Dario Franchitti (United Kingdom) Kevin McGarrity	8																	23
=	(Spain) Oriol Servià																	8	23
92	(Germany) Oliver Kuttner											20						19	23
93	(United States) Bryan Herta	9																	22
=	(United States) Cort Wagner				9														22
=	(United States) Al Unser Jr.											9							22
94	(United Kingdom) Oliver Gavin	10																	21
=	(Germany) Ralf Kelleners																	10	21
95	(United Kingdom) Ian James	30								12									20
96	(United Kingdom) Warren Hughes (United Kingdom) Mike Newton	12																	19
=	(Canada) Scott Maxwell		12																19
97	(United States) Ryan Hunter-Reay																	14	17
=	(Canada) Kenny Wilden	27		18															17
=	(United States) Shawn Bayliff			(28)	(23)	25	20												17
=	(United States) Peter Argetsinger					25	20												17
98	(United States) Tony Stewart	15																	16
=	(United States) Spencer Pumpelly																15		16
99	(United States) Rick Knoop (United States) Duncan Dayton (United States) Brian DeVries (United States) Jim Matthews	16																	15
=	(Estonia) Tõnis Kasemets															24	23		15
100	(Switzerland) Harold Primat	17																	14
=	(France) Stéphan Grégoire											(24)						17	14
101	(United States) Ted Christopher	18																	13
=	(Canada) Hugo Guenette											18							13
102	(Germany) Marcel Tiemann									19									12
103	(United States) Tim Hubman			28	23														11
104	(United States) Kyle Petty	21																	10
=	(United States) John Pew			21															10
=	(Canada) James Hinchcliffe (Canada) Mark Wilkins													21					10
=	(Brazil) Vítor Meira																	21	10
105	(United States) Wally Dallenbach Jr. (United States) Darin Brassfield (United States) George Robinson	22																	9
106	(United States) Rusty Wallace (United States) Danica Patrick (United Kingdom) Allan McNish (Netherlands) Jan Lammers	24																	7
=	(United States) Brian Cunningham														24				7
107	(United States) David Russell																	26	5
108	(Brazil) Raul Boesel (France) Sébastien Bourdais	28																	3
109	(France) Emmanuel Collard	29																	2
Pos.	Drivers	DAY	MEX	HMS	LBH	VIR		LGA		PHX		WGL	MDO	DAY	BAR	WGL	SON	UTA	Points
Pos.	Drivers	DAY	MEX	HMS	LBH	QR	R	QR	R	QR	R	WGL	MDO	DAY	BAR	WGL	SON	UTA	Points

Colour	Result
Gold	Winner
Silver	Second place
Bronze	Third place
Green	Points classification
Blue	Non-points classification
Blue	Non-classified finish (NC)
Purple	Retired, not classified (Ret)
Red	Did not qualify (DNQ)
Red	Did not pre-qualify (DNPQ)
Black	Disqualified (DSQ)
White	Did not start (DNS)
White	Withdrew (WD)
White	Race cancelled (C)
Blank	Did not practice (DNP)
Blank	Did not arrive (DNA)
Blank	Excluded (EX)

**Bold** - Pole position

Italics - Fastest lap

==== Standings: Grand Touring (GT) - Top 10 ====
Pos	Driver	Points
1	(United States) Andy Lally	509
1	(United States) Marc Bunting	509
2	(Germany) Wolf Henzler	498
2	(United Kingdom) Robin Liddell	498
3	(United States) Paul Edwards	451
3	(United States) Kelly Collins	451
4	(United States) Eric Lux	365
5	(United States) Leh Keen	363
5	(United States) David Murry	363
6	(United States) Andrew Davis	351
7	(United Kingdom) Robert Nearn	335
7	(United States) Steve Johnson	335
8	(United States) Jim Tafel	332
9	(United States) Peter MacLeod	296
9	(United States) Gene Sigal	296
10	(United Kingdom) Ian James	295

=== Teams' Championship ===
==== Standings: Daytona Prototypes (DP) ====
Pos.	Drivers	DAY	MEX	HMS	LBH	VIR		LGA		PHX		WGL	MDO	DAY	BAR	WGL	SON	UTA	Points
Pos.	Drivers	DAY	MEX	HMS	LBH	QR	R	QR	R	QR	R	WGL	MDO	DAY	BAR	WGL	SON	UTA	Points
1	(United States) #01 CompUSA Chip Ganassi with Felix Sabates	20	1	3	1	22	3	6	10	2	1	7	21	3	10	1	1	4	446
2	(United States) #76 Krohn Racing		2	8	7	4	5	12	3	7	7	1	2	1	1	9	9	6	436
3	(United States) #10 Suntrust Racing	29	9	11	8	11	2	5	1	4	4	3	4	4	2	2	4	14	431
4	(United States) #19 Playboy/Uniden Racing	6	8	4	21	1	4	4	4	6	6	6	24	8	6	21	10	2	398
5	(United States) #23 Alex Job Racing/Emory Motorsports	3		1	2	2	1	1	24	19	20	15	20	2	3	3	20	10	380
6	(United States) #99 Gainsco/Blackhawk Racing	13	13	6	25	19	14	7	2	3	8	2	3	5	4	13	25	9	367
7	(United States) #5 Essex/Finlay Motorsports	16	12	5	6	3	9	8	8	8	9	12	10	7	22	5	6	23	360
8	(United States) #60 Michael Shank Racing	2	19	22	5	6	13	2	11	17	16	4	7	10	9	4	13	(1)	344
9	(United States) #4 Howard-Boss Motorsports	15	4	24	4	9	6	9	6	21	15	5	5	24	23	18	2	3	341
10	(Mexico) #12 Lowe's Fernández Racing	26	7	14	11	13	8	13	15	1	5	22	1	17	5	25	3	21	332
11	(United States) #58 Red Bull/Brumos Porsche	4	15	10	15	8	12	22	5	22	12	17	8	12	13	6	8	7	332
12	(United States) #6 Playboy Racing/Mears-Lexus/Riley	27	3	18	9	10	23	10	13	5	23	14	9	6	7	10	11	5	326
13	(United States) #89 Pacific Coast Motorsports	23	11	13	16	12	24	3	16	10	2	10	6	16	20	8	5	13	324
14	(United States) #39 Crown Royal Special Reserve/Cheever	11	6	2	24	5	7	26	27	20	10	13	19	9	8	7	12	11	313
15	(United States) #77 Feeds The Need/Doran Racing	7	5	19	22	7	19	14	9	9	21	8	13	25	15	23	16	8	287
16	(United States) #11 CITGO Racing by SAMAX	8	16	23	18	20	11	11	7	12	11	11	18	26	17	19	7	16	276
17	(United States) #75 Krohn Racing	5	14	16	12	23	17	15	22	16	14	16	15	23	12	12	18	12	265
18	(United States) #3 Southard Motorsports	(19)	24	21	3	24	15	17	12	13	3	21	17	11	11	11	22	18	257
19	(United States) #59 Brumos Racing	18	22	12	14	18	16	18	18	15	18	23	11	19	16	15	19	22	233
20	(United States) #40 Derhaag Motorsports	14	23	17	10	15	18	19	19	23	13	18	12	14	25	16	14	25	232
21	(United States) #09 Spirit of Daytona Racing	17	18	20	19	16	22	24	14	14	17	24	25	18	21	17		17	193
22	(United States) #8 Synergy Racing	25	10	27	26	14	25	27	17	18	22	9	22		24	22	15	26	167
23	(United States) #7 Tuttle Team Racing	21	21	26	17	21	21			11	19	19	27	22	19	26	21	20	154
Pos.	Drivers	DAY	MEX	HMS	LBH	VIR		LGA		PHX		WGL	MDO	DAY	BAR	WGL	SON	UTA	Points
Pos.	Drivers	DAY	MEX	HMS	LBH	QR	R	QR	R	QR	R	WGL	MDO	DAY	BAR	WGL	SON	UTA	Points
