= 2006 24 Hours of Daytona =

Previous: 2005	Next: 2007
Index: Races | Winners

Track map of Daytona International Speedway

The 2006 Rolex 24 at Daytona was a Grand-Am Rolex Sports Car Series 24-hour endurance sports car race held on January 28–29, 2006 at the Daytona International Speedway road course. The race served as the first round of the 2006 Rolex Sports Car Series. The overall winner of the race was the No. 02 Chip Ganassi/Felix Sabates owned Lexus-Riley Mk XI driven by Scott Dixon, Dan Wheldon, and Casey Mears. The GT class was won by No. 36 Porsche 996 GT3 Cup from TPC Racing, driven by Randy Pobst, Spencer Pumpelly, Michael Levitas, and Ian Baas.

== Race results ==
Class winners in bold.

Pos	Class	No	Team	Drivers	Chassis	Laps
Pos	Class	No	Team	Drivers	Engine	Laps
1	**DP**	**02**	**(United States) Target Chip Ganassi Racing with Felix Sabates**	**(New Zealand) Scott Dixon (United Kingdom) Dan Wheldon (United States) Casey Mears**	**Riley Mk XI**	**734**
1	**DP**	**02**	**(United States) Target Chip Ganassi Racing with Felix Sabates**	**(New Zealand) Scott Dixon (United Kingdom) Dan Wheldon (United States) Casey Mears**	**Lexus 5.0 L V8**	**734**
2	DP	60	(United States) Michael Shank Racing	(Brazil) Oswaldo Negri Jr. (United States) Mark Patterson (United States) A. J. Allmendinger (United Kingdom) Justin Wilson	Riley Mk XI	733
2	DP	60	(United States) Michael Shank Racing	(Brazil) Oswaldo Negri Jr. (United States) Mark Patterson (United States) A. J. Allmendinger (United Kingdom) Justin Wilson	Lexus 5.0 L V8	733
3	DP	23	(United States) Alex Job Racing/Emory Motorsports	(United States) Patrick Long (Germany) Mike Rockenfeller (Germany) Lucas Luhr	Crawford DP03	731
3	DP	23	(United States) Alex Job Racing/Emory Motorsports	(United States) Patrick Long (Germany) Mike Rockenfeller (Germany) Lucas Luhr	Porsche 3.9 L Flat-6	731
4	DP	58	(United States) Brumos Racing	(United States) David Donohue (United States) Darren Law (Germany) Sascha Maassen	Fabcar FDSC/03	730
4	DP	58	(United States) Brumos Racing	(United States) David Donohue (United States) Darren Law (Germany) Sascha Maassen	Porsche 3.9 L Flat-6	730
5	DP	75	(United States) Krohn Racing	(United States) Tracy Krohn (Sweden) Niclas Jönsson (Germany) Jörg Bergmeister (United States) Colin Braun	Riley Mk XI	717
5	DP	75	(United States) Krohn Racing	(United States) Tracy Krohn (Sweden) Niclas Jönsson (Germany) Jörg Bergmeister (United States) Colin Braun	Pontiac 5.0 L V8	717
6	DP	19	(United States) Playboy/Uniden Racing	(United States) Memo Gidley (United States) Michael McDowell (United States) Alex Barron	Crawford DP03	716
6	DP	19	(United States) Playboy/Uniden Racing	(United States) Memo Gidley (United States) Michael McDowell (United States) Alex Barron	Ford 5.0 L V8	716
7	DP	77	(United States) Feeds The Need/Doran Racing	(United States) Forest Barber (United States) Terry Borcheller (Mexico) Michel Jourdain Jr. (United States) Harrison Brix	Doran JE4	703
7	DP	77	(United States) Feeds The Need/Doran Racing	(United States) Forest Barber (United States) Terry Borcheller (Mexico) Michel Jourdain Jr. (United States) Harrison Brix	Ford 5.0 L V8	703
8	DP	7	(United States) CITGO Racing/SAMAX Motorsport	(United Kingdom) Dario Franchitti (Venezuela) Milka Duno (United Kingdom) Marino Franchitti (United Kingdom) Kevin McGarrity	Riley Mk XI	695
8	DP	7	(United States) CITGO Racing/SAMAX Motorsport	(United Kingdom) Dario Franchitti (Venezuela) Milka Duno (United Kingdom) Marino Franchitti (United Kingdom) Kevin McGarrity	Pontiac 5.0 L V8	695
9	**GT**	**36**	**(United States) TPC Racing**	**(United States) Randy Pobst (United States) Spencer Pumpelly (United States) Michael Levitas (United States) Ian Baas**	**Porsche 996 GT3 Cup**	**691**
9	**GT**	**36**	**(United States) TPC Racing**	**(United States) Randy Pobst (United States) Spencer Pumpelly (United States) Michael Levitas (United States) Ian Baas**	**Porsche 3.6 L Flat-6**	**691**
10	GT	65	(United States) The Racer's Group	(United States) Andy Lally (United States) Marc Bunting (United States) R. J. Valentine (United States) Johnny O'Connell	Pontiac GTO.R	688
10	GT	65	(United States) The Racer's Group	(United States) Andy Lally (United States) Marc Bunting (United States) R. J. Valentine (United States) Johnny O'Connell	Pontiac LS2 6.0 L V8	688
11	DP	28	(United States) Finlay Motorsports	(United States) Michael Valiante (United States) Rob Finlay (United States) Bryan Herta (United States) Buddy Rice	Crawford DP03	684
11	DP	28	(United States) Finlay Motorsports	(United States) Michael Valiante (United States) Rob Finlay (United States) Bryan Herta (United States) Buddy Rice	Ford 5.0 L V8	684
12	GT	82	(United States) Farnbacher Loles Racing	(Germany) Dirk Werner (Austria) Dieter Quester (Austria) Philipp Peter (Italy) Luca Riccitelli	Porsche 997 GT3 Cup	683
12	GT	82	(United States) Farnbacher Loles Racing	(Germany) Dirk Werner (Austria) Dieter Quester (Austria) Philipp Peter (Italy) Luca Riccitelli	Porsche 3.6 L Flat-6	683
13	GT	66	(United States) The Racer's Group	(Monaco) Stéphane Ortelli (United Kingdom) Robert Nearn (France) Cyrille Sauvage (United States) Steve Johnson	Porsche 997 GT3 Cup	678
13	GT	66	(United States) The Racer's Group	(Monaco) Stéphane Ortelli (United Kingdom) Robert Nearn (France) Cyrille Sauvage (United States) Steve Johnson	Porsche 3.6 L Flat-6	678
14	DP	16	(United States) Howard-Boss Motorsports	(United States) Chris Dyson (United States) Rob Dyson (United Kingdom) Oliver Gavin (United Kingdom) Guy Smith	Crawford DP03	675
14	DP	16	(United States) Howard-Boss Motorsports	(United States) Chris Dyson (United States) Rob Dyson (United Kingdom) Oliver Gavin (United Kingdom) Guy Smith	Pontiac 5.0 L V8	675
15	GT	83	(United States) Farnbacher Loles Racing	(Germany) Dominik Farnbacher (United States) Mike Fitzgerald (Germany) Pierre Ehret (Germany) Marc Basseng	Porsche 997 GT3 Cup	671
15	GT	83	(United States) Farnbacher Loles Racing	(Germany) Dominik Farnbacher (United States) Mike Fitzgerald (Germany) Pierre Ehret (Germany) Marc Basseng	Porsche 3.6 L Flat-6	671
16	GT	72	(United States) Tafel Racing	(Germany) Wolf Henzler (United Kingdom) Robin Liddell (United States) Johannes van Overbeek (United States) Graham Rahal	Porsche 997 GT3 Cup	670
16	GT	72	(United States) Tafel Racing	(Germany) Wolf Henzler (United Kingdom) Robin Liddell (United States) Johannes van Overbeek (United States) Graham Rahal	Porsche 3.6 L Flat-6	670
17 DNF	DP	39	(United States) Cheever Racing	(Brazil) Christian Fittipaldi (United States) Eddie Cheever (Canada) Patrick Carpentier	Crawford DP03	669
17 DNF	DP	39	(United States) Cheever Racing	(Brazil) Christian Fittipaldi (United States) Eddie Cheever (Canada) Patrick Carpentier	Lexus 5.0 L V8	669
18	GT	17	(United States) SAMAX Motorsport	(United Kingdom) Johnny Mowlem (Germany) Lance David Arnold (United States) Bryan Sellers (Canada) David Shep (Germany) Jan Seyffarth	Porsche 997 GT3 Cup	663
18	GT	17	(United States) SAMAX Motorsport	(United Kingdom) Johnny Mowlem (Germany) Lance David Arnold (United States) Bryan Sellers (Canada) David Shep (Germany) Jan Seyffarth	Porsche 3.6 L Flat-6	663
19	GT	00	(United States) TZ Motorsports	(United States) Ronald Zitza (United States) James Thomason Jr. (United States) Tim Lewis Jr. (United States) Kevin Wheeler	Porsche 996 GT3 Cup	655
19	GT	00	(United States) TZ Motorsports	(United States) Ronald Zitza (United States) James Thomason Jr. (United States) Tim Lewis Jr. (United States) Kevin Wheeler	Porsche 3.6 L Flat-6	655
20	GT	41	(United States) Team Sahlen	(United States) Wayne Nonnamaker (United States) Joe Nonnamaker (United States) Will Nonnamaker (Puerto Rico) Victor Gonzalez Jr.	Porsche 996 GT3 Cup	653
20	GT	41	(United States) Team Sahlen	(United States) Wayne Nonnamaker (United States) Joe Nonnamaker (United States) Will Nonnamaker (Puerto Rico) Victor Gonzalez Jr.	Porsche 3.6 L Flat-6	653
21	GT	22	(Italy) Fiorano Racing	(Canada) Jean-François Dumoulin (United States) Nick Longhi (United States) Emil Assentato (United States) Lonnie Pechnik (United States) Jep Thornton	Porsche 996 GT3 Cup	651
21	GT	22	(Italy) Fiorano Racing	(Canada) Jean-François Dumoulin (United States) Nick Longhi (United States) Emil Assentato (United States) Lonnie Pechnik (United States) Jep Thornton	Porsche 3.6 L Flat-6	651
22	DP	51	(United States) Cheever Racing	(Sweden) Stefan Johansson (United Kingdom) Warren Hughes (Brazil) Thomas Erdos (United Kingdom) Mike Newton	Crawford DP03	645
22	DP	51	(United States) Cheever Racing	(Sweden) Stefan Johansson (United Kingdom) Warren Hughes (Brazil) Thomas Erdos (United Kingdom) Mike Newton	Lexus 5.0 L V8	645
23	GT	93	(United States) TPC Racing	(United States) Tony Ave (United States) Rob Stewart (United States) Dave Stewart (United States) Bob Gilbert (United States) Gary Stewart	Porsche 996 GT3 Cup	636
23	GT	93	(United States) TPC Racing	(United States) Tony Ave (United States) Rob Stewart (United States) Dave Stewart (United States) Bob Gilbert (United States) Gary Stewart	Porsche 3.6 L Flat-6	636
24	DP	99	(United States) GAINSCO/Blackhawk Racing	(United States) Alex Gurney (United States) Bob Stallings (United States) Jimmy Vasser (United States) Rocky Moran Jr.	Riley Mk XI	635
24	DP	99	(United States) GAINSCO/Blackhawk Racing	(United States) Alex Gurney (United States) Bob Stallings (United States) Jimmy Vasser (United States) Rocky Moran Jr.	Pontiac 5.0 L V8	635
25	GT	74	(United States) Tafel Racing	(United States) Andrew Davis (United States) Charles Espenlaub (United States) Eric Lux (United States) Jim Tafel (United States) Michael Cawley	Porsche 997 GT3 Cup	634
25	GT	74	(United States) Tafel Racing	(United States) Andrew Davis (United States) Charles Espenlaub (United States) Eric Lux (United States) Jim Tafel (United States) Michael Cawley	Porsche 3.6 L Flat-6	634
26	GT	64	(United States) The Racer's Group	(United States) Paul Edwards (United States) Kelly Collins (United States) Andy Pilgrim (Denmark) Jan Magnussen	Pontiac GTO.R	633
26	GT	64	(United States) The Racer's Group	(United States) Paul Edwards (United States) Kelly Collins (United States) Andy Pilgrim (Denmark) Jan Magnussen	Pontiac LS2 6.0 L V8	633
27	GT	67	(United States) The Racer's Group	(United States) Patrick Flanagan (United States) Bohdan Kroczek (United States) Bill Keith (United States) Marc Bullock	Porsche 996 GT3 Cup	625
27	GT	67	(United States) The Racer's Group	(United States) Patrick Flanagan (United States) Bohdan Kroczek (United States) Bill Keith (United States) Marc Bullock	Porsche 3.6 L Flat-6	625
28	GT	46	(United States) Michael Baughman Racing	(United States) Ray Mason (United States) Michael Baughman (United States) John Connolly (United States) Frank Del Vecchio (United States) Bryan Collyer	Chevrolet Corvette C5	623
28	GT	46	(United States) Michael Baughman Racing	(United States) Ray Mason (United States) Michael Baughman (United States) John Connolly (United States) Frank Del Vecchio (United States) Bryan Collyer	Chevrolet 7.0 L V8	623
29	DP	40	(United States) Derhaag Motorsports	(Canada) Ron Fellows (United States) Randy Ruhlman (United States) Chris Bingham (United Kingdom) Justin Bell	Riley Mk XI	620
29	DP	40	(United States) Derhaag Motorsports	(Canada) Ron Fellows (United States) Randy Ruhlman (United States) Chris Bingham (United Kingdom) Justin Bell	Pontiac 5.0 L V8	620
30	DP	4	(United States) Howard-Boss Motorsports	(United Kingdom) Andy Wallace (United States) Butch Leitzinger (United States) Tony Stewart	Crawford DP03	593
30	DP	4	(United States) Howard-Boss Motorsports	(United Kingdom) Andy Wallace (United States) Butch Leitzinger (United States) Tony Stewart	Pontiac 5.0 L V8	593
31	GT	05	(United States) Sigalsport BMW	(United States) Bill Auberlen (United States) Matthew Alhadeff (United States) Tommy Milner (United States) Justin Marks (United States) Gene Sigal	BMW M3 E46	592
31	GT	05	(United States) Sigalsport BMW	(United States) Bill Auberlen (United States) Matthew Alhadeff (United States) Tommy Milner (United States) Justin Marks (United States) Gene Sigal	BMW 3.2 L I6	592
32	GT	81	(United States) Synergy Racing	(United States) John Pew (United States) Steve Marshall (United States) Hal Prewitt (United States) Danny Marshall (United States) Ben McCrackin	Porsche 996 GT3 Cup	589
32	GT	81	(United States) Synergy Racing	(United States) John Pew (United States) Steve Marshall (United States) Hal Prewitt (United States) Danny Marshall (United States) Ben McCrackin	Porsche 3.6 L Flat-6	589
33	GT	06	(United States) Banner Racing	(United States) Tommy Archer (United States) Leighton Reese (United States) Russ Oasis (United States) Dino Crescentini	Chevrolet Corvette C6	589
33	GT	06	(United States) Banner Racing	(United States) Tommy Archer (United States) Leighton Reese (United States) Russ Oasis (United States) Dino Crescentini	Chevrolet 7.0 L V8	589
34 DNF	DP	5	(United States) Essex Racing	(United States) Duncan Dayton (United States) Rick Knoop (United States) Brian DeVries (United States) Jim Matthews (United States) James Gue	Crawford DP03	585
34 DNF	DP	5	(United States) Essex Racing	(United States) Duncan Dayton (United States) Rick Knoop (United States) Brian DeVries (United States) Jim Matthews (United States) James Gue	Ford 5.0 L V8	585
35 DNF	DP	09	(United States) Spirit of Daytona Racing	(United States) Bobby Labonte (United States) Doug Goad (Switzerland) Harold Primat (United States) Larry Oberto	Crawford DP03	572
35 DNF	DP	09	(United States) Spirit of Daytona Racing	(United States) Bobby Labonte (United States) Doug Goad (Switzerland) Harold Primat (United States) Larry Oberto	Pontiac 5.0 L V8	572
36 DNF	DP	59	(United States) Brumos Racing	(United States) J. C. France (Portugal) João Barbosa (United States) Ted Christopher (United States) Hurley Haywood	Fabcar FDSC/03	559
36 DNF	DP	59	(United States) Brumos Racing	(United States) J. C. France (Portugal) João Barbosa (United States) Ted Christopher (United States) Hurley Haywood	Porsche 3.9 L Flat-6	559
37	GT	68	(United States) The Racer's Group	(United States) Jim Lowe (United States) Revere Greist (United States) Jim Pace	Porsche 996 GT3 Cup	555
37	GT	68	(United States) The Racer's Group	(United States) Jim Lowe (United States) Revere Greist (United States) Jim Pace	Porsche 3.6 L Flat-6	555
38	DP	3	(United States) Southard Motorsports	(United States) Shane Lewis (United States) Kris Szekeres (United States) Randy LaJoie (Canada) Tony Burgess	Riley Mk XI	548
38	DP	3	(United States) Southard Motorsports	(United States) Shane Lewis (United States) Kris Szekeres (United States) Randy LaJoie (Canada) Tony Burgess	BMW 5.0 L V8	548
39 DNF	DP	01	(United States) CompUSA Chip Ganassi Racing with Felix Sabates	(United States) Scott Pruett (Mexico) Luis Díaz (Italy) Max Papis	Riley Mk XI	510
39 DNF	DP	01	(United States) CompUSA Chip Ganassi Racing with Felix Sabates	(United States) Scott Pruett (Mexico) Luis Díaz (Italy) Max Papis	Lexus 5.0 L V8	510
40	GT	87	(United States) Synergy Racing	(United States) Dave Gaylord (United States) Wes Hill (United States) Ken Hill (United States) Will Diefenbach	Porsche 997 GT3 Cup	503
40	GT	87	(United States) Synergy Racing	(United States) Dave Gaylord (United States) Wes Hill (United States) Ken Hill (United States) Will Diefenbach	Porsche 3.6 L Flat-6	503
41	GT	43	(United States) Team Sahlen	(United States) Wes Allen (United States) Eddie Hennessy (United States) Jim Michaelian (Puerto Rico) Manuel Matos (United States) Wayne Nonnamaker	Porsche 996 GT3 Cup	435
41	GT	43	(United States) Team Sahlen	(United States) Wes Allen (United States) Eddie Hennessy (United States) Jim Michaelian (Puerto Rico) Manuel Matos (United States) Wayne Nonnamaker	Porsche 3.6 L Flat-6	435
42 DNF	DP	11	(United States) Tuttle Team Racing	(United States) Brian Tuttle (United States) Kyle Petty (United States) Boris Said	Riley Mk XI	415
42 DNF	DP	11	(United States) Tuttle Team Racing	(United States) Brian Tuttle (United States) Kyle Petty (United States) Boris Said	BMW 5.0 L V8	415
43 DNF	DP	84	(United States) Robinson Racing	(United States) Wally Dallenbach Jr. (United States) George Robinson (United States) Paul Dallenbach (United States) Darin Brassfield	Riley Mk XI	413
43 DNF	DP	84	(United States) Robinson Racing	(United States) Wally Dallenbach Jr. (United States) George Robinson (United States) Paul Dallenbach (United States) Darin Brassfield	Pontiac 5.0 L V8	413
44 DNF	DP	89	(United States) Pacific Coast Motorsports	(United Kingdom) Ryan Dalziel (United States) Jon Fogarty (United States) Alex Figge (Canada) David Empringham	Riley Mk XI	301
44 DNF	DP	89	(United States) Pacific Coast Motorsports	(United Kingdom) Ryan Dalziel (United States) Jon Fogarty (United States) Alex Figge (Canada) David Empringham	Pontiac 5.0 L V8	301
45	GT	80	(United States) Synergy Racing	(United States) David Murry (United States) Leh Keen (United States) Craig Stanton (France) Xavier Pompidou	Porsche 996 GT3 Cup	299
45	GT	80	(United States) Synergy Racing	(United States) David Murry (United States) Leh Keen (United States) Craig Stanton (France) Xavier Pompidou	Porsche 3.6 L Flat-6	299
46 DNF	GT	69	(United States) The Racer's Group	(United States) Josh Vargo (United States) Jake Vargo (United States) Mark Herrington (United States) Brady Refenning	Porsche 996 GT3 Cup	287
46 DNF	GT	69	(United States) The Racer's Group	(United States) Josh Vargo (United States) Jake Vargo (United States) Mark Herrington (United States) Brady Refenning	Porsche 3.6 L Flat-6	287
47 DNF	GT	70	(United States) Speedsource	(Canada) Sylvain Tremblay (United States) David Haskell (United States) Jeff Altenburg (United States) Nick Ham	Mazda RX-8	284
47 DNF	GT	70	(United States) Speedsource	(Canada) Sylvain Tremblay (United States) David Haskell (United States) Jeff Altenburg (United States) Nick Ham	Mazda 1.3 L RENESIS	284
48 DNF	GT	71	(United States) SAMAX Motorsport/Doncaster Racing	(Canada) Dave Lacey (United States) Brent Martini (Canada) Greg Wilkins (Canada) Mark Wilkins (United Kingdom) Johnny Mowlem	Porsche 997 GT3 Cup	278
48 DNF	GT	71	(United States) SAMAX Motorsport/Doncaster Racing	(Canada) Dave Lacey (United States) Brent Martini (Canada) Greg Wilkins (Canada) Mark Wilkins (United Kingdom) Johnny Mowlem	Porsche 3.6 L Flat-6	278
49 DNF	GT	57	(United States) Stevenson Motorsports	(United States) Vic Rice (United States) Tommy Riggins (United States) John Stevenson (United States) Spencer Trenery (United States) Dominic Cicero II	Chevrolet Corvette C6	278
49 DNF	GT	57	(United States) Stevenson Motorsports	(United States) Vic Rice (United States) Tommy Riggins (United States) John Stevenson (United States) Spencer Trenery (United States) Dominic Cicero II	Chevrolet 7.0 L V8	278
50 DNF	DP	2	(United States) Howard-Boss Motorsports	(Netherlands) Jan Lammers (United States) Danica Patrick (United Kingdom) Allan McNish (United States) Rusty Wallace	Crawford DP03	273
50 DNF	DP	2	(United States) Howard-Boss Motorsports	(Netherlands) Jan Lammers (United States) Danica Patrick (United Kingdom) Allan McNish (United States) Rusty Wallace	Pontiac 5.0 L V8	273
51 DNF	DP	8	(United States) Synergy Racing	(United States) Brian Frisselle (United States) Burt Frisselle (United States) Clint Field (Netherlands) Patrick Huisman	Doran JE4	206
51 DNF	DP	8	(United States) Synergy Racing	(United States) Brian Frisselle (United States) Burt Frisselle (United States) Clint Field (Netherlands) Patrick Huisman	Porsche 3.9 L Flat-6	206
52 DNF	DP	12	(Mexico) Lowe's Fernández Racing	(Mexico) Adrián Fernández (Brazil) Mário Haberfeld (United States) Scott Sharp	Riley Mk XI	187
52 DNF	DP	12	(Mexico) Lowe's Fernández Racing	(Mexico) Adrián Fernández (Brazil) Mário Haberfeld (United States) Scott Sharp	Pontiac 5.0 L V8	187
53 DNF	GT	48	(Switzerland) WTF Engineering	(Switzerland) Toni Seiler (Switzerland) Robert Dubler (Switzerland) Hans Hauser (United States) Michael DeFontes (United States) Kurt Thiel	Chevrolet Corvette C5	174
53 DNF	GT	48	(Switzerland) WTF Engineering	(Switzerland) Toni Seiler (Switzerland) Robert Dubler (Switzerland) Hans Hauser (United States) Michael DeFontes (United States) Kurt Thiel	Chevrolet 7.0 L V8	174
54 DNF	DP	6	(United States) Graydon Elliott Fusion Racing with Michael Shank Racing	(Canada) Paul Tracy (United States) Paul Mears Jr. (United States) Mike Borkowski (Canada) Ken Wilden	Riley Mk XI	168
54 DNF	DP	6	(United States) Graydon Elliott Fusion Racing with Michael Shank Racing	(Canada) Paul Tracy (United States) Paul Mears Jr. (United States) Mike Borkowski (Canada) Ken Wilden	Lexus 5.0 L V8	168
55 DNF	GT	21	(United States) Matt Connolly Motorsports	(United States) Gerald Van Uitert (United States) Matt Connolly (United States) Carlos de Quesada (United States) Rick Sutherland (United States) Tom Sutherland	BMW M3 E46	159
55 DNF	GT	21	(United States) Matt Connolly Motorsports	(United States) Gerald Van Uitert (United States) Matt Connolly (United States) Carlos de Quesada (United States) Rick Sutherland (United States) Tom Sutherland	BMW 3.2 L I6	159
56 DNF	DP	78	(United States) Doran Racing	(United States) B. J. Zacharias (France) Sébastien Bourdais (Brazil) Raul Boesel	Doran JE4	156
56 DNF	DP	78	(United States) Doran Racing	(United States) B. J. Zacharias (France) Sébastien Bourdais (Brazil) Raul Boesel	Ford 5.0 L V8	156
57 DNF	DP	10	(United States) SunTrust Racing	(South Africa) Wayne Taylor (France) Emmanuel Collard (Italy) Max Angelelli (Australia) Ryan Briscoe	Riley Mk XI	123
57 DNF	DP	10	(United States) SunTrust Racing	(South Africa) Wayne Taylor (France) Emmanuel Collard (Italy) Max Angelelli (Australia) Ryan Briscoe	Pontiac 5.0 L V8	123
58 DNF	GT	52	(Italy) Mastercar	(Italy) Constantino Bertuzzi (Spain) Luis Monzón (United Kingdom) Bo McCormick (Austria) Philipp Baron	Ferrari 360 Modena Challenge	118
58 DNF	GT	52	(Italy) Mastercar	(Italy) Constantino Bertuzzi (Spain) Luis Monzón (United Kingdom) Bo McCormick (Austria) Philipp Baron	Ferrari 3.6 L V8	118
59 DNF	GT	15	(United States) Autometrics Motorsports	(United States) Cory Friedman (United States) Patrick Small (United States) Mac McGehee (United States) Bill Martin (United States) Tony Herring	Porsche 996 GT3 Cup	104
59 DNF	GT	15	(United States) Autometrics Motorsports	(United States) Cory Friedman (United States) Patrick Small (United States) Mac McGehee (United States) Bill Martin (United States) Tony Herring	Porsche 3.6 L Flat-6	104
60 DNF	GT	55	(United States) ASC Motorsports	(United States) Zach Arnold (United States) John Miller (United States) Eric Koselke (United States) Jay Poscente (United States) Mark Montgomery	Chevrolet Corvette C6	103
60 DNF	GT	55	(United States) ASC Motorsports	(United States) Zach Arnold (United States) John Miller (United States) Eric Koselke (United States) Jay Poscente (United States) Mark Montgomery	Chevrolet 7.0 L V8	103
61 DNF	GT	24	(United States) Matt Connolly Motorsports	(United States) Brian O'Shaughnessy (United States) Bill Cotter (United States) Tom Malloy (United States) Jacob Shalit (United States) Billy Johnson	BMW M3 E46	101
61 DNF	GT	24	(United States) Matt Connolly Motorsports	(United States) Brian O'Shaughnessy (United States) Bill Cotter (United States) Tom Malloy (United States) Jacob Shalit (United States) Billy Johnson	BMW 3.2 L I6	101
62 DNF	GT	63	(United States) Team Spencer Motorsports	(United States) Dennis Spencer (United States) Scott Spencer (United States) Roger Mandeville (United States) Rich Grupp (United States) Gary Drummond	Mazda RX-8	101
62 DNF	GT	63	(United States) Team Spencer Motorsports	(United States) Dennis Spencer (United States) Scott Spencer (United States) Roger Mandeville (United States) Rich Grupp (United States) Gary Drummond	Mazda 1.3 L RENESIS	101
63 DNF	GT	08	(United States) Goldin Brothers Racing	(United States) Steve Goldin (United States) Keith Goldin (United States) Scott Finlay (United States) Scott Richards (United States) Kurt Thiel	Mazda RX-8	48
63 DNF	GT	08	(United States) Goldin Brothers Racing	(United States) Steve Goldin (United States) Keith Goldin (United States) Scott Finlay (United States) Scott Richards (United States) Kurt Thiel	Mazda 1.3 L RENESIS	48
64 DNF	GT	04	(United States) Sigalsport BMW	(United States) Gene Sigal (United States) Peter MacLeod (Slovakia) Miroslav Konôpka (United States) Blake Rosser	BMW M3 E46	34
64 DNF	GT	04	(United States) Sigalsport BMW	(United States) Gene Sigal (United States) Peter MacLeod (Slovakia) Miroslav Konôpka (United States) Blake Rosser	BMW 3.2 L I6	34
65 DNF	GT	86	(United States) Synergy Racing	(United States) Don Kitch Jr. (United States) Chris Pennington (United States) Don Gagne (United States) Chris Pallis	Porsche 997 GT3 Cup	17
65 DNF	GT	86	(United States) Synergy Racing	(United States) Don Kitch Jr. (United States) Chris Pennington (United States) Don Gagne (United States) Chris Pallis	Porsche 3.6 L Flat-6	17
66 DNF	DP	50	(United States) Blackforest Motorsports	(United States) Henry Zogaib (United Kingdom) Ian James (United States) Tom Nastasi (United States) Chris Gleason	Crawford DP03	5
66 DNF	DP	50	(United States) Blackforest Motorsports	(United States) Henry Zogaib (United Kingdom) Ian James (United States) Tom Nastasi (United States) Chris Gleason	Ford 5.0 L V8	5
