= Patrick Long =

American racing driver (born 1981)

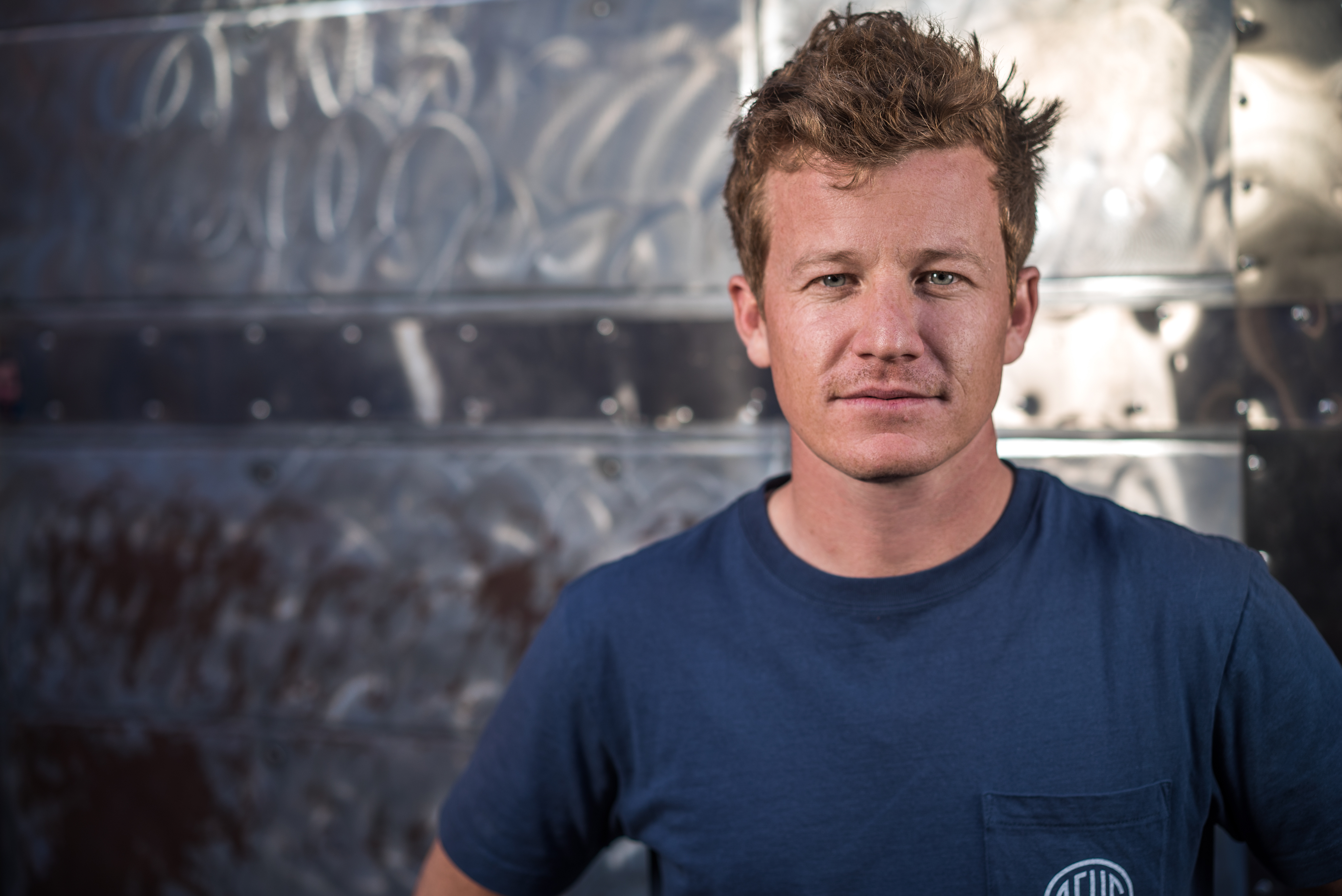
- Long in 2015
- Nationality: (United States) American
- Born: Patrick Brian Long; July 28, 1981 (age 45) Thousand Oaks, California, U.S.

Pirelli World Challenge, FIA World Endurance Championship career
- Debut season: 2016
- Current team: Wright Motorsports (PWC), Abu Dhabi-Proton Racing (WEC)
- Categorisation: FIA Platinum
- Car number: 58 (PWC), 88 (WEC)

Championship titles
- ALMS GT2 Class Champion ('05, '09, '10), Pirelli World Challenge ('11, '17)

24 Hours of Le Mans career
- Years: 2004–2019
- Teams: White Lightning Racing, Petersen Motorsports, Flying Lizard Motorsports, IMSA Performance, Dempsey-Del Piero Racing, Dempsey Proton Racing, Abu Dhabi-Proton Racing
- Best finish: 10th
- Class wins: 2 (2004, 2007)

NASCAR Cup Series career
- 1 race run over 1 year
- Best finish: 58th (2012)
- First race: 2012 Finger Lakes 355 (Watkins Glen)
Wins	Top tens	Poles
0	0	0

NASCAR O'Reilly Auto Parts Series career
- 1 race run over 1 year
- Best finish: 104th (2010)
- First race: 2010 Bucyrus 200 (Road America)
Wins	Top tens	Poles
0	0	0
- Statistics up to date as of August 12, 2012.

Patrick Brian Long (born July 28, 1981) is an American professional racing driver. He has competed in Pirelli World Challenge and the FIA World Endurance Championship, as well as the NASCAR Sprint Cup Series, NASCAR Nationwide Series, NASCAR K&N Pro Series East, and NASCAR K&N Pro Series West.

Long is one of eighteen Porsche factory racing drivers, and the only American to hold that distinction.

== Racing career ==
=== Sports car racing ===
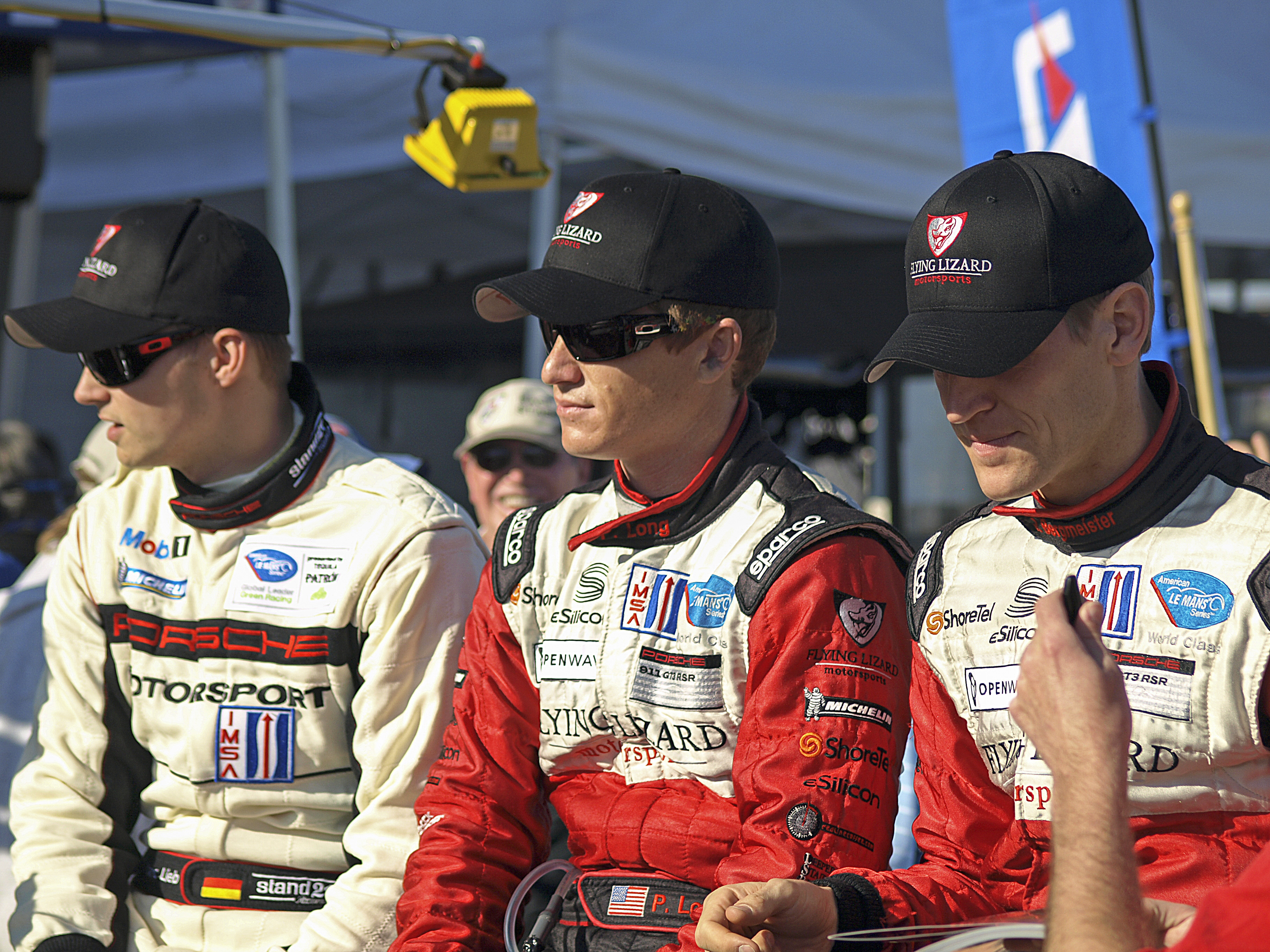
Long and his Flying Lizard Motorsports teammates in 2010

Following a successful career in karts and the open wheel ladder system, Thousand Oaks-born Long caught the eye of Red Bull, and was included in the inaugural Red Bull Formula 1 Driver Search. During that test, he came to the attention of Porsche, for whom he has driven — first as a Junior driver, then as a Factory driver, since 2003. Long has had notable success racing for Porsche, including class wins at all four sportscar "classics" - the 24 Hours of Le Mans (2005, 2007), the Rolex 24 At Daytona (2009), Petit Le Mans (2005, 2006, 2007) and the Mobil One 12 Hours of Sebring (2005).

Long is a three-time American Le Mans Series driver's champion, winning the GT2/GT class in 2005, 2009 and 2010, and won the Pirelli World Challenge Driver's Championship in 2011 and 2017. Additionally, he was part of the driving trio that claimed the first international competition victory for the innovative Porsche 911 GT3 R Hybrid, in the 2010 1000 km of Zhuhai, China. From 2006 to 2008, Long drove for Penske Racing in a Porsche RS Spyder, culminating in an LMP2 class victory and second place overall at the 2008 Petit Le Mans.

In 2015, Long led the Dempsey-Proton team to success in the FIA World Endurance Championship, co-driving with Marco Seefried and Patrick Dempsey, notably scoring a second place finish at the 24 Hours of Le Mans and helping secure Dempsey's first professional racing victory in the GTE-AM class at Fuji, in Japan.

For 2016, Long raced twin programs: again in the FIA WEC in No. 88 Abu Dhabi-Proton Racing Porsche 911 RSR with Khaled Al Qubaisi and David Heinemeier Hansson, as well as a full-season attack on the Pirelli World Challenge with Wright Motorsports.

Long has also made two starts in the Australian V8 Supercar Series — in 2010 for Garry Rogers Motorsport Fujitsu Racing where he finished fourth and eleventh in the dual races at the Gold Coast, and in 2011 for Walkinshaw Bundaberg Racing where he finished fifth and seventeenth in dual races.

=== NASCAR ===
Patrick has made starts in various NASCAR racing series, including one start in the Sprint Cup (Watkins Glen, 2012) where he finished 42nd due to brake issues, and one in Nationwide Series (2010, Road America) where he finished fourteenth after starting sixth leading two laps in a D'Hondt Humphrey Motorsports Toyota. Long also competed five races in K&N Pro Series East between 2009 and 2010, four races in ovals, where his best finish was fifth at Tri-County Motor Speedway but his most successful start came at road course: on June 6, 2009, Long was leading the K&N Pro Series' race at Watkins Glen on the last lap before being passed in the final turn. He also competed in NASCAR K&N Pro Series West just two weeks later, Long was in second place on the last lap of the K&N Pro Series West race at Infineon Raceway when he made contact with the leader (Joey Logano) who spun out. Although Long took the checkered flag first, he was stripped of the win by NASCAR due to contact and placed at the tail end of the lead lap. After the penalty, Long finished 23rd after having started on the pole. Later that season, he took a convincing first victory at Utah Motorsports Campus, in Salt Lake City. In 2010, Long won the NASCAR West event at Portland. He also was leading once again at Utah when a flat tire ended his day with three laps remaining. Long also competed in ovals, like Irwindale Speedway, Iowa Speedway and Phoenix in the West Series, between 2009 and 2010, but he finished fourth, fifteenth and eighteenth respectively. Long also attempted the 2012 race of K&N Pro Series West at Utah Motorsports Campus, but due to engine issues, he withdrew. Long also has one ARCA Racing Series start in 2009, where he took pole position and victory after led 46 of 67 laps at NJMP after a race long scrap with Parker Kligerman.

== Personal life ==
Long's younger brother, Kevin "Spanky" Long, is a professional skateboarder.

== Motorsports career results ==
=== 24 Hours of Le Mans results ===
Year	Team	Co-drivers	Car	Class	Laps	Pos.	Class pos.
2004	(United States) White Lightning Racing	(Germany) Jörg Bergmeister (Germany) Sascha Maassen	Porsche 911 GT3-RS	GT	327	10th	**1st**
2005	(United States) Petersen Motorsports (United States) White Lightning Racing	(Germany) Jörg Bergmeister (Germany) Timo Bernhard	Porsche 911 GT3-RSR	GT2	331	11th	**2nd**
2006	(United States) Flying Lizard Motorsports	(United States) Johannes van Overbeek (United States) Seth Neiman	Porsche 911 GT3-RSR	GT2	309	18th	4th
2007	(France) IMSA Performance Matmut	(France) Raymond Narac (Austria) Richard Lietz	Porsche 911 GT3 RSR	GT2	320	15th	**1st**
2008	(France) IMSA Performance Matmut	(France) Raymond Narac (Austria) Richard Lietz	Porsche 911 GT3 RSR	GT2	26	DNF	DNF
2009	(France) IMSA Performance Matmut	(France) Raymond Narac (France) Patrick Pilet	Porsche 911 GT3 RSR	GT2	265	DNF	DNF
2010	(France) IMSA Performance Matmut	(France) Raymond Narac (France) Patrick Pilet	Porsche 911 GT3 RSR	GT2	321	17th	5th
2011	(United States) Flying Lizard Motorsports	(Germany) Jörg Bergmeister (Germany) Lucas Luhr	Porsche 911 GT3 RSR	GTE; Pro	310	18th	6th
2012	(United States) Flying Lizard Motorsports	(Germany) Jörg Bergmeister (Germany) Marco Holzer	Porsche 911 GT3 RSR	GTE; Pro	114	DNF	DNF
2013	(United States) Dempsey Del Piero-Proton	(United States) Patrick Dempsey (United States) Joe Foster	Porsche 911 GT3 RSR	GTE; Am	305	28th	4th
2014	(United States) Dempsey Racing-Proton	(United States) Patrick Dempsey (United States) Joe Foster	Porsche 911 RSR	GTE; Am	329	24th	5th
2015	(Germany) Dempsey-Proton Racing	(United States) Patrick Dempsey (Germany) Marco Seefried	Porsche 911 RSR	GTE; Am	330	22nd	**2nd**
2016	(United Arab Emirates) Abu Dhabi-Proton Racing	(United Arab Emirates) Khaled Al Qubaisi (Denmark) David Heinemeier Hansson	Porsche 911 RSR	GTE; Am	330	28th	**3rd**
2017	(Germany) Proton Competition	(United States) Mike Hedlund (Saudi Arabia) Abdulaziz Al Faisal	Porsche 911 RSR	GTE; Am	329	37th	9th
2018	(Germany) Proton Competition	(United States) Tim Pappas (United States) Spencer Pumpelly	Porsche 911 RSR	GTE; Am	334	29th	4th
2019	(Germany) Dempsey-Proton Racing	(United States) Tracy Krohn (Sweden) Niclas Jönsson	Porsche 911 RSR	GTE; Am	-	WD	WD

=== Complete FIA World Endurance Championship results ===
Year	Entrant	Class	Car	Engine	1	2	3	4	5	6	7	8	9	Rank	Points
2015	Dempsey Racing-Proton	LMGTE Am	Porsche 911 RSR	Porsche 4.0 L Flat-6	SIL; 6	SPA; 5	LMS; 2	NÜR; 4	**COA**; 4	FUJ; 1	SHA; 4	BHR; 3		5th	131
2016	Abu Dhabi-Proton Racing	LMGTE Am	Porsche 911 RSR	Porsche 4.0 L Flat-6	SIL	SPA; 6	LMS; 2	NÜR; 4	MEX; 1	COA	FUJ; 5	SHA; 4	BHR; 1	4th	130

=== Rolex Sports Car Series results ===
(key)

Year	Team	Car	Engine	Class	1	2	3	4	5	6	7	8	9	10	11	12	13	14	15	Rank	Points	Ref
2004	The Racer's Group/Monster Cable	Porsche 911 GT3 RS	Porsche 3.6 L Flat-6	GT	DAY; 5	MIA	PHX															
2004	Doncaster Racing	Porsche 911 GT3 Cup	Porsche 3.6 L Flat-6	SGS				MTT; DNF	S6H	DAY	MOH	WGI	MIA	VIR	ALA	FON						
2005	Flying Lizard Motorsports	Porsche 911 GT3 Cup	Porsche 3.6 L Flat-6	GT	DAY; 13																	
2005	Aasco Motorsports	Porsche 911 GT3 Cup	Porsche 3.6 L Flat-6	GT		MIA	FON; 4	LAG; DNF	MTT	S6H	DAY; 12	ALA	WGI; 10	MOH	PHX; 6		VIR; DNF	MEX				
2005	Essex Racing	Crawford DP03	Ford 5.0 L V8	DP												WGI; 9						
2006	Alex Job Racing	Crawford DP03	Porsche 3.9 L Flat-6	DP	DAY; 3	MEX	MIA; 1	LBH; 2	VIR; 1	LAG; 24	PHX; 20	LRP	S6H; 15	MOH; 20	DAY; 2	ALA; 3	WGI; 3	SON; 20	UTA	10th	359	
2007	Alex Job Racing	Crawford DP03	Porsche 3.9 L Flat-6	DP	DAY; 12	MEX; 5	MIA; 9	VIR; 9	LAG; 1		S6H; 8	MOH; 6	DAY; 14	IOW; 10	ALA; 8	MON; DNF	WGI; 9	SON; 7	UTA; 5	7th	319	
2007	Synergy Racing	Porsche 911 GT3 Cup	Porsche 3.6 L Flat-6	GT						LRP; 8												
2008	Alex Job Racing	Crawford DP03	Porsche 3.9 L Flat-6	DP	DAY; DNF																	
2008	Farnbacher Loles Racing	Porsche 911 GT3 Cup	Porsche 3.6 L Flat-6	GT		MIA; 18	MEX															
2008	Synergy Racing	Porsche 911 GT3 Cup	Porsche 3.6 L Flat-6	GT				VIR; 14	LAG	LRP	S6H	MOH	DAY	ALA	MON	WGI	SON	NJY				
2008	The Racer's Group	Porsche 911 GT3 Cup	Porsche 3.6 L Flat-6	GT															UTA; 3			
2009	The Racer's Group	Porsche 911 GT3 Cup	Porsche 3.6 L Flat-6	GT	DAY; 1	VIR	NJY	LAG	S6H	MOH	DAY	ALA	WGI	MON	UTA	MIA				50th	35	
2010	The Racer's Group	Porsche 911 GT3 Cup	Porsche 3.6 L Flat-6	GT	DAY; 2	MIA	ALA	VIR	LRP	S6H	MOH	DAY	NJY	WGI	MON	UTA						
2011	Flying Lizard Motorsports	Riley Mk. XI	Porsche 4.0L Flat-6	DP	DAY; DNF	MIA	ALA	VIR	LRP	S6H	ELK	LAG	NJY	WGI	MON	MOH						
2012	Flying Lizard Motorsports	Porsche 911 GT3 Cup	Porsche 3.8 L Flat-6	GT	DAY; 15	ALA	MIA	NJY	DET	MOH	ELK											
2012	Magnus Racing	Porsche 911 GT3 Cup	Porsche 3.8 L Flat-6	GT								S6H; DNF	IMS	WGI	MON	LAG	LRP					
2013	Park Place Motorsports	Porsche 911 GT3 Cup	Porsche 4.0 L Flat-6	GT	DAY; 16	COA; 4	ALA; 8	ATL; 2	DET; 6	MOH; 5	WGI; 8	IMS; DNF	ELK; 2	KAN; 2	LAG; 4	LRP; 9				5th	303	

=== American Le Mans Series results ===
(key)

Year	Team	Car	Engine	Class	1	2	3	4	5	6	7	8	9	10	11	12	Rank	Points	Ref
2003	The Racer's Group	Porsche 911 GT3 RS	Porsche 3.6 L Flat-6	GT	SEB	ATL	SON	TRO	MOS	ELK	LAG	MIA	PET; 4						
2004	The Racer's Group	Porsche 911 GT3 RSR	Porsche 3.6 L Flat-6	GT	SEB; 8	MOH; 4	LRP; 6	SON; 5	POR; 5	MOS; 5	ELK; 4	PET; 7	LAG; 5						
2005	Petersen Motorsports White Lightning Racing	Porsche 911 GT3 RSR	Porsche 3.6 L Flat-6	GT2	SEB; 1	ATL; 3	MOH; 2	LRP; 2	SON; 2	POR; 8	ELK; 1	MOS; 1	PET; 1	LAG; 1					
2006	Penske Racing	Porsche RS Spyder	Porsche MR6 3.4L V8	LMP2	SEB; DNF												NC	0	
2006	Petersen Motorsports White Lightning Racing	Porsche 911 GT3 RSR	Porsche 3.6 L Flat-6	GT2		HOU; 4	MOH; 7	LRP; 1	UTA; 2	POR; 2	ELK; 1	MOS; 6	PET; 1	LAG; 2			3rd	137	
2007	Tafel Racing	Porsche 911 GT3 RSR	Porsche 3.6 L Flat-6	GT2	SEB; 3												17th	51	
2007	Flying Lizard Motorsports	Porsche 911 GT3 RSR	Porsche 3.6 L Flat-6	GT2		STP	LBH; 2	HOU	UTA	LRP	MOH	ELK	MOS	DET; 2			17th	51	
2007	Penske Racing	Porsche RS Spyder	Porsche MR6 3.4L V8	LMP2											PET; 1	LAG	20th	26	
2008	Penske Racing	Porsche RS Spyder	Porsche MR6 3.4L V8	LMP2	SEB; DNF	STP; 3	LBH; 3	UTA; 2	LRP; 3	MOH; 4	ELK; 4	MOS; 3	DET; 5	PET; 3	LAG; 8		5th	129	
2009	Flying Lizard Motorsports	Porsche 911 GT3 RSR	Porsche 4.0 L Flat-6	GT2	SEB; 4	STP; 1	LBH; 1	UTA; 1	LRP; 1	MOH; 1	ELK; 4	MOS; 5	PET; 5	LAG; 1			1st	181	
2010	Flying Lizard Motorsports	Porsche 911 GT3 RSR	Porsche 4.0 L Flat-6	GT	SEB; 4	LBH; 1	LAG; 1	UTA; 5	LRP; 1	MOH; 4	ELK; 2	MOS; 1	PET; 5				1st	157	
2011	Flying Lizard Motorsports	Porsche 911 GT3 RSR	Porsche 4.0 L Flat-6	GT	SEB; 6	LBH; DNF	LRP; 2	MOS; 13	MOH; 9	ELK; 4	BAL; 11	LAG; 1	PET; 2				4th	106	
2012	Flying Lizard Motorsports	Porsche 911 GT3 RSR	Porsche 4.0 L Flat-6	GT	SEB; 10	LBH; 7	LAG; 6	LRP; 1	MOS; DSQ	MOH; 2	ELK; 2	BAL; 5	VIR; 2	PET; 5			5th	111	
2013	CORE Autosport	Porsche 911 GT3 RSR	Porsche 4.0 L Flat-6	GT	SEB	LBH	LAG; 7	LRP; 4	MOS; 8	ELK; 5	BAL; DNF	COA; DNF	VIR; 2	PET; 8			11th	55	

=== IMSA SportsCar Championship results ===
(key) (Races in bold indicate pole position) (Races in italics indicate fastest lap)

Year	Team	Car	Engine	Class	1	2	3	4	5	6	7	8	9	10	11	12	Rank	Points	Ref
2014	Porsche North America	Porsche 911 RSR	Porsche 4.0 L Flat-6	GTLM	DAY; 9	SEB; 1	LBH; 5	LAG; 8	WGI; 8	MOS; 9	IMS; 3	ELK; 5	VIR; 8	COA; 3	PET; 2		6th	303	
2015	Team Falken Tire	Porsche 911 RSR	Porsche 4.0 L Flat-6	GTLM	DAY; 8	SEB; 3	LGA	LGA	WGL	MOS	ELK	VIR	AUS	PET; 7			16th	80	
2016	Black Swan Racing	Porsche 911 GT3 R	Porsche 4.0 L Flat-6	GTD	DAY; 2	SEB; 13	LBH	LGA	WGL	MOS	LIM	ELK	VIR	AUS	PET		26th	52	
2017	CORE Autosport	Porsche 911 GT3 R	Porsche 4.0 L Flat-6	GTD	DAY; 22	SEB	LBH	AUS	BEL	WGL	MOS						29th	90	
2017	Alegra Motorsports	Porsche 911 GT3 R	Porsche 4.0 L Flat-6	GTD								LIM; 3	ELK	VIR; 9	LAG; 16		29th	90	
2017	Riley Motorsports - WeatherTech Racing	Porsche 911 GT3 R	Porsche 4.0 L Flat-6	GTD												PET; 17	29th	90	
2018	Wright Motorsports	Porsche 911 GT3 R	Porsche 4.0 L Flat-6	GTD	DAY; 19	SEB; 6	MOH; 7	DET; 11	WGI; 9	MOS; 9	LRP; 8	ELK; 1	VIR; 2	LAG; 11	PET; 4		7th	263	
2019	Park Place Motorsports	Porsche 911 GT3 R	Porsche 4.0 L Flat-6	GTD	DAY; 7	SEB; 6	MOH; 4	DET; 2	WGL; 13	MOS; 4	LIM; 4	ELK; 15	VIR; 5	LAG; DNS	PET		11th	193	
2020	Wright Motorsports	Porsche 911 GT3 R	Porsche 4.0 L Flat-6	GTD	DAY; 4	DAY; 7	SEB; 9†	ELK; 5	VIR; 5	ATL; 3	MOH; 3	CLT; 2	PET; 4	LGA; 6	**SEB**; **1**		2nd	284	
2021	Wright Motorsports	Porsche 911 GT3 R	Porsche 4.0 L Flat-6	GTD	DAY; 4	**SEB**; 2	MOH; 12	DET	WGL; 8	WGL	LIM; 8	ELK; 3	LGA; 3	LBH; 3	VIR; 4	PET; 5	4th	2943	

^{†} Points only counted towards the WeatherTech Sprint Cup and not the overall GTD Championship.

=== Blancpain GT World Challenge America results ===
(key)

Year	Team	Car	Engine	Class	1	2	3	4	5	6	7	8	9	10	11	12	13	14	15	16	17	18	19	20	Rank	Points
2016	EFFORT Racing	Porsche 911 GT3 R		GT	COA1; 1	COA2; DNF	STP1; 7	STP2; 4	LBH; 3	BAR1; 5	BAR2; 4														2nd	1629
2016	Wright Motorsports	Porsche 911 GT3 R		GT								MOS1; 1	MOS2; 1	LRP1; 7	LRP2; 2	ELK1; 4	ELK2; 5	MOH1; 12	MOH2; 9	UTA1; 3	UTA2; 3	SON1; 8	SON2; 4	LAG; 4	2nd	1629
2017	Wright Motorsports	Porsche 911 GT3 R		GT	STP1; 3	STP2; 1	LBH; 2	VIR1; 6	VIR2; DNF	MOS; 2	LRP1; 1	LRP2; DNF	ELK1; 2	ELK2; 1	MOH1; 5	MOH2; 2	UTA1; 3	UTA2; 6	COA1; 1	COA2; 8	COA3; 2	SON1; 3	SON2; 2		1st	365
2019	Wright Motorsports	Porsche 911 GT3 R		GT	COA1; 3	COA2; 3	VIR1; 13	VIR2; 2	MOS1; 6	MOS2; 4	SON1; 6	SON2; 1	WGI1	WGI2	ELK1	ELK2	LVS1	LVS2							4th*	101*

* Season is still in progress.

=== V8 Supercar results ===
Year	Team	1	2	3	4	5	6	7	8	9	10	11	12	13	14	15	16	17	18	19	20	21	22	23	24	25	26	27	28	Final pos	Points
2010	Garry Rogers Motorsport	YMC; R1	YMC; R2	BHR; R3	BHR; R4	ADE; R5	ADE; R6	HAM; R7	HAM; R8	QLD; R9	QLD; R10	WIN; R11	WIN; R12	HDV; R13	HDV; R14	TOW; R15	TOW; R16	PHI; R17	BAT; R18	SUR; R19; 4	SUR; R20; 11	SYM; R21	SYM; R22	SAN; R23	SAN; R24	SYD; R25	SYD; R26			NC	0 +
2011	Walkinshaw Racing	YMC; R1	YMC; R2	ADE; R3	ADE; R4	HAM; R5	HAM; R6	PER; R7	PER; R8	PER; R9	WIN; R10	WIN; R11	HDV; R12	HDV; R13	TOW; R14	TOW; R15	QLD; R16	QLD; R17	QLD; R18	PHI; R19	BAT; R20	SUR; R21; 5	SUR; R22; 15	SYM; R23	SYM; R24	SAN; R25	SAN; R26	SYD; R27	SYD; R28	58th	171

+ Not Eligible for points

=== 24 Hours Nürburgring results ===
Year	Team	Co-drivers	Car	Class	Laps	Pos.	Class pos.
2011	(Germany) Porsche Team Manthey	(Germany) Jörg Bergmeister (Austria) Richard Lietz (Germany) Marco Holzer	Porsche 911 GT3 R Hybrid	E1-XP Hybrid	139	27th	1st

=== Bathurst 12 Hour results ===
Year	Team	Co-drivers	Car	Class	Laps	Pos.	Class pos.
2014	(Australia) Competition Motorsports	(Australia) David Calvert-Jones (Australia) Alex Davison	Porsche 997 GT3 Cup	B	284	9th	2nd
2015	(Australia) Ice Break Racing	(Australia) David Calvert-Jones (New Zealand) Chris Pither	Porsche 997 GT3-R	AP	267	11th	8th
2017	(Australia) Competition Motorsports	(Australia) David Calvert-Jones (Germany) Marc Lieb (Australia) Matt Campbell	Porsche 911 GT3 R	APA	289	2nd	1st
2018	(United States) Competition Motorsports	(Australia) David Calvert-Jones (Australia) Alex Davison (Australia) Matt Campbell	Porsche 911 GT3 R	APA	271	4th	2nd

=== NASCAR ===
(key) (Bold – Pole position awarded by qualifying time. Italics – Pole position earned by points standings or practice time. * – Most laps led.)

==== Sprint Cup Series ====
NASCAR Sprint Cup Series results
Year	Team	No.	Make	1	2	3	4	5	6	7	8	9	10	11	12	13	14	15	16	17	18	19	20	21	22	23	24	25	26	27	28	29	30	31	32	33	34	35	36	NSCC	Pts	Ref
2012	Inception Motorsports	30	Toyota	DAY	PHO	LVS	BRI	CAL	MAR	TEX	KAN	RCH	TAL	DAR	CLT	DOV	POC	MCH	SON	KEN	DAY	NHA	IND	POC	GLN; 42	MCH	BRI	ATL	RCH	CHI	NHA	DOV	TAL	CLT	KAN	MAR	TEX	PHO	HOM	58th	2	

==== Nationwide Series ====
NASCAR Nationwide Series results
Year	Team	No.	Make	1	2	3	4	5	6	7	8	9	10	11	12	13	14	15	16	17	18	19	20	21	22	23	24	25	26	27	28	29	30	31	32	33	34	35	NNSC	Pts	Ref
2010	D'Hondt Humphrey Motorsports	90	Toyota	DAY	CAL	LVS	BRI	NSH	PHO	TEX	TAL	RCH	DAR	DOV	CLT	NSH	KEN	ROA; 14	NHA	DAY	CHI	GTY	IRP	IOW	GLN	MCH	BRI	CGV	ATL	RCH	DOV	KAN	CAL	CLT	GTY	TEX	PHO	HOM	104th	126	

==== K&N Pro Series East ====
NASCAR K&N Pro Series East results
Year	Team	No.	Make	1	2	3	4	5	6	7	8	9	10	11	NKNPSEC	Pts	Ref
2009	Dave Davis Motorsports	03	Chevy	GRE; 6	TRI; 5	IOW	SBO	GLN; 4*	NHA; 9	TMP	ADI	LRP	NHA	DOV	20th	613	
2010	Dave Davis Motorsports	03	Chevy	GRE; 7	SBO	IOW	MAR	NHA	LRP	LEE	JFC	NHA	DOV		46th	146	

==== K&N Pro Series West ====
K&N Pro Series West results
Year	Team	No.	Make	1	2	3	4	5	6	7	8	9	10	11	12	13	14	15	NKNPSWC	Pts	Ref
2009	Sunrise Ford Racing	9	Ford	CTS	AAS	PHO	MAD	IOW	DCS	**SON**; 23	IRW; 4	PIR	**MMP**; 1*	CNS					22nd	567	
2009	Dave Davis Motorsports	03	Dodge												IOW; 15	AAS			22nd	567	
2010	Speed Wong Racing	45	Dodge	AAS	PHO	IOW	DCS	SON	IRW	PIR; 1*	MRP	CNS							30th	411	
2010	Sunrise Ford Racing	9	Ford										**MMP**; 22*	AAS	PHO; 18				30th	411	
2012	NDS Motorsports	53	Dodge	PHO	LHC	MMP; DNQ	S99	IOW	BIR	LVS	SON	EVG	CNS	IOW	PIR	SMP	AAS	PHO	85th	16	
