= Crown Royal 200 at the Glen =

WeatherTech 240 at The Glen

IMSA WeatherTech SportsCar Championship
- Venue: Watkins Glen International
- Corporate sponsor: WeatherTech
- First race: 1984
- First IMSA race: 2021
- Duration: 2 Hours 40 Minutes
- Previous names: Crown Royal 200 at the Glen
- Most wins (driver): Max Angelelli (3)
- Most wins (team): All American Racers, SunTrust Racing (3)
- Most wins (manufacturer): Riley (9)

The Crown Royal 200 at the Glen was a Rolex Sports Car Series race held at Watkins Glen International. The race was first run in 1984 by the IMSA GT Championship. The "New York 500" initially was a second Watkins Glen round running for a shorter 500-kilometre (310 mi) distance compared to the Continental, using both classes of competitors. However, in 1986, the race was split into two events, the prototypes retaining the 500 km event, and GT cars given a shorter 300 km (190 mi) race. In 1987 prototypes were dropped entirely, and the race served as a 500 km GT event until 1991. Grand-Am revived the race in 2001, running the event on the same weekend as the NASCAR Sprint Cup series' Finger Lakes 355 at The Glen, and using Watkins Glen's short course.

On April 7, 2021, IMSA announced the cancellation of the event at Canadian Tire Motorsport Park because of Canadian quarantine restrictions, replacing it with a standard-distance (three hour race, 2 hours, 40 minutes of racing format) at Watkins Glen International on Friday, July 2, dubbed the "WeatherTech 240 at The Glen." The race used the format intended for Mosport, with all classes competing; however the GTD class only scored points towards the WeatherTech Sprint Cup.

== Winners ==
Year	Drivers	Team	Car	Distance/Duration	Race title	Report
IMSA GT Championship
1984^{A}	(United States) Dale Whittington (United States) Randy Lanier	(United States) Blue Thunder Racing Team	March 83G-Chevrolet	500 km (310 mi)	New York 500	report
1985^{A}	(United States) Al Holbert (United Kingdom) Derek Bell	(United States) Holbert Racing	Porsche 962	500 km (310 mi)	Serengeti Drivers New York 500	report
1986^{B}	(United States) Davy Jones (United States) John Andretti	(United States) BMW North America	BMW GTP	500 km (310 mi)	Kodak Copier 500	report
1986^{B}	(United States) Dennis Aase	(United States) All American Racers	Toyota Celica Turbo	300 km (190 mi)	Kodak Copier 500	report
1987	(United States) Willy T. Ribbs	(United States) All American Racers	Toyota Celica Turbo	500 km (310 mi)	Kodak Copier 500	report
1988	(United States) Dennis Aase (United States) Chris Cord	(United States) All American Racers	Toyota Celica Turbo	500 km (310 mi)	Kodak Copier 500	report
1989	(West Germany) Hans-Joachim Stuck (West Germany) Walter Röhrl	(United States) Audi of America	Audi 90 quattro	500 km (310 mi)	Kodak Copier 500	report
1990	(United States) Dorsey Schroeder	(United States) Whistler Radar	Mercury Cougar XR-7	500 km (310 mi)	New York 500	report
1991	(New Zealand) Steve Millen (Canada) Jeremy Dale	(United States) Cunningham Racing	Nissan 300ZX	500 km (310 mi)	New York 500	report
1992 – 2000	Not held					
Grand-Am
2001	(United Kingdom) James Weaver (United States) Butch Leitzinger	(United States) Dyson Racing	Riley & Scott Mk III-Ford	250 mi (400 km)	Bully Hill Vineyards 250	report
2002	(United States) Butch Leitzinger (United States) Rob Dyson	(United States) Dyson Racing	Riley & Scott Mk III-Ford	250 mi (400 km)	Bully Hill Vineyards 250	report
2003	(United States) Forest Barber (United States) Terry Borcheller	(United States) Bell Motorsports	Doran JE4-Chevrolet	250 mi (400 km)	Bully Hill Vineyards 250	report
2004	(Belgium) Didier Theys (Denmark) Jan Magnussen	(United States) Doran Lista Racing	Doran JE4-Lexus	200 mi (320 km)	Sahlen's 200 at the Glen	report
2005 (August)	(South Africa) Wayne Taylor (Italy) Max Angelelli	(United States) SunTrust Racing	Riley Mk XI-Pontiac	200 mi (320 km)	CompUSA 200 at the Glen	report
2005 (Sept)	(South Africa) Wayne Taylor (Italy) Max Angelelli	(United States) SunTrust Racing	Riley Mk XI-Pontiac	200 mi (320 km)	Crown Royal 200 at the Glen	report
2006^{C}	(United States) Scott Pruett (Mexico) Luis Díaz	(United States) Chip Ganassi Racing	Riley Mk XI-Lexus	200 mi (320 km)	Crown Royal 200 at the Glen	report
2007^{C}	(United States) Alex Gurney (United States) Jon Fogarty	(United States) GAINSCO/Bob Stallings Racing	Riley Mk XI-Pontiac	200 mi (320 km)	Crown Royal 200 at the Glen	report
2008^{C}	(United States) Brian Frisselle (Canada) Mark Wilkins	(Canada) AIM Autosport	Riley Mk XX-Ford	200 mi (320 km)	Crown Royal 200 at the Glen	report
2009	(Sweden) Nic Jönsson (Brazil) Ricardo Zonta	(United States) Krohn Racing	Lola B08/70-Ford	200 mi (320 km)	Crown Royal 200 at the Glen	report
2010	(United States) Scott Pruett (Mexico) Memo Rojas	(United States) Chip Ganassi Racing with Felix Sabates	Riley Mk XX-BMW	200 mi (320 km)	Crown Royal 200 at the Glen	report
2011	(Italy) Max Angelelli (United States) Ricky Taylor	(United States) SunTrust Racing	Dallara DP08-Chevrolet	200 mi (320 km)	Canadian Tire 200 at the Glen	report
2012	(United States) Ryan Dalziel (Germany) Lucas Luhr	(United States) Starworks Motorsport	Riley Mk XX-Ford	200 mi (320 km)	Continental Tire 200	report
2013 – 2020	Not held					
IMSA SportsCar Championship
2021	(Brazil) Pipo Derani (Brazil) Felipe Nasr	(United States) Whelen Engineering Racing	Cadillac DPi-V.R	2 Hours, 40 Minutes	WeatherTech 240 at the Glen	report

^A Combined Prototype/GT field
^B Separate Prototype & GT races
^C Daytona Prototypes only
