= Derhaag Motorsports =

Sports car racing team

#40 Riley Pontiac competing in the 2006 Rolex 24 At Daytona

Derhaag Motorsports is a professional sports car racing team. Founded by former driver Jim Derhaag, the team currently competes in the Trans-Am Series.

The team formerly competed in the Grand-Am Rolex Sports Car Series, using Pontiac engines and chassis from Riley Technologies. It is sponsored by Preformed Line Products.

== Drivers ==
- (United States) Randy Ruhlman
- (Canada) Ron Fellows
- (United Kingdom) Justin Bell
- (United States) Paul Dallenbach
- (United States) Chris Bingham
