= Chris Bingham =

American racing driver

- Born: Christopher Bingham; December 15, 1971 (age 54); Kirkland, Washington, U.S.

NASCAR O'Reilly Auto Parts Series career
- 11 races run over 1 year
- Best finish: 55th (2003)
- First race: 2003 Rockingham 200 (Rockingham)
- Last race: 2003 Carquest Auto Parts 300 (Charlotte)
Wins	Top tens	Poles
0	0	0
- Statistics up to date as of May 13, 2020.

Christopher Bingham (born December 15, 1971) is an American professional racing driver from Kirkland, Washington. He is a noted sports car driver but also competed in stock cars, with eleven Busch Series starts and one ARCA start in his career.

== Racing career ==
=== Early career ===
Bingham started in motocross at the age of ten, and ventured into car racing after completing an advance driving course at the Jim Russell Racing School in 1991. He began his professional racing career in 1994 at the last round of the IMSA championship, finishing 15th at the 2 hours of Phoenix driving a Tiga DBIV for Bobby Brown Racing. In 1997, Bingham participated in the 24 Hours of Daytona in a GT3-class Porsche and made four Indy Lights starts, with a best finish of 11th at Nazareth Speedway. He returned to Daytona and made his 12 Hours of Sebring debut in 1998. In 1999 and 2000 Bingham was the #2 driver for the Hybrid R&D Riley & Scott-Ford Le Mans Prototype team in the American Le Mans Series. He also passed his Indy Racing League rookie test with Mid-America Motorsports but decided not to pursue an entry into the IRL. In 2001 and 2002, Bingham drove the works Saleen S7R in the Grand-Am Series' GTS class to back to back championships, including 11 class victories.

=== NASCAR Busch Series ===
Bingham decided to foray into NASCAR in 2003, when Bingham signed a deal to drive for Jay Robinson Racing in the Busch Series. He made his debut at North Carolina, starting 38th and finishing 34th after transmission issues. DNFs would plague his season, as Bingham fell out of seven of his eleven starts. Even when he did not fall out, Bingham struggled, earning just a career-best finish of 26th at Darlington and Texas. After his inconsistency, Bingham was released following a 33rd at Charlotte.

=== Return to sports cars ===
Bingham returned to the Grand Am Series' Daytona Prototype class in 2004 and began fielding his own entry in 2005. In 2006, he drove Derhaag Motorsports' Daytona Prototype but resigned from the team in August after poor finishes. Earlier that season, he was involved in a fistfight with competitor J. C. France after the two collided at Autodromo Hermanos Rodriguez in Mexico City and was suspended for one race and placed on probation. He did not make any appearances in the series in 2007.

== Motorsports career results ==
=== Complete American Open Wheel racing results ===
(key)

==== Indy Lights ====
Year	Team	1	2	3	4	5	6	7	8	9	10	11	12	13	Rank	Points
1997	Leading Edge Motorsports	MIA; 15	LBH; 13	NAZ; 11	SAV	STL	MIL	DET	POR; 21	TOR	TRO	VAN	LAG	FON	**29th**	**2**

=== NASCAR ===
(key) (Bold – Pole position awarded by qualifying time. Italics – Pole position earned by points standings or practice time. * – Most laps led.)

==== Busch Series ====
NASCAR Busch Series results
Year	Team	No.	Make	1	2	3	4	5	6	7	8	9	10	11	12	13	14	15	16	17	18	19	20	21	22	23	24	25	26	27	28	29	30	31	32	33	34	NBSC	Pts	Ref
2003	Jay Robinson Racing	49	Ford	DAY	CAR; 34	LVS; 37	DAR; 26	BRI; 37	TEX; 26	TAL	NSH; 42		RCH; 34			CLT; 33	DOV	NSH	KEN	MLW	DAY	CHI	NHA	PPR	IRP	MCH	BRI	DAR	RCH	DOV	KAN	CLT	MEM	ATL	PHO	CAR	HOM	55th	680	
2003	Jay Robinson Racing	39	Ford									CAL; 38		GTY; 34	NZH; 30																							55th	680	

=== ARCA Re/Max Series ===
(key) (Bold – Pole position awarded by qualifying time. Italics – Pole position earned by points standings or practice time. * – Most laps led.)

ARCA Re/Max Series results
Year	Team	No.	Make	1	2	3	4	5	6	7	8	9	10	11	12	13	14	15	16	17	18	19	20	21	22	ARMC	Pts	Ref
2003	Capital City Motorsports	83	Pontiac	DAY; 27	ATL	NSH	SLM	TOL	KEN	CLT	BLN	KAN	MCH	LER	POC	POC	NSH	ISF	WIN	DSF	CHI	SLM	TAL	CLT	SBO	163rd	95	
