= Riley MkXI =

Riley MkXI Riley MkXX Riley MkXXII Riley MkXXVI
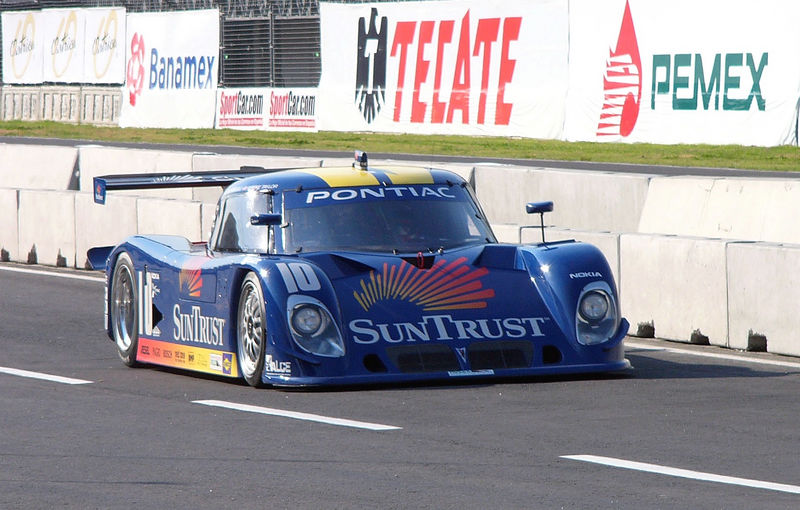
- Category: Daytona Prototype
- Constructor: Riley Technologies
- Designers: Bob Riley; Bill Riley
- Successor: Riley-Multimatic MkXXX

Technical specifications
- Chassis: Hybrid Aluminum Honeycomb / Carbon fiber body panels on steel spaceframe
- Suspension: Double wishbone, push-rod-actuated coil springs over shock absorbers
- Length: ~ 4,509 mm (177.5 in)
- Width: ~ 1,996 mm (78.6 in)
- Height: ~ 1,095 mm (43.1 in)
- Wheelbase: 2,794 mm (110.0 in)
- Engine: Ford / Lexus / Pontiac / BMW / Porsche / Chevrolet 4,000–5,000 cc (4.0–5.0 L; 244.1–305.1 cu in) 24-valve to 32-valve, OHC/DOHC V8, naturally-aspirated, mid-mounted
- Transmission: Xtrac/Emco 5-speed or 6-speed sequential
- Weight: 900–1,021 kg (1,984.2–2,250.9 lb)

Competition history
- Debut: 2004 24 Hours of Daytona
- First win: 2004 Phoenix 250
- Last win: 2015 Lone Star Le Mans
- Last event: 2016 6 Hours of The Glen
Wins	Podiums	Poles
84	120	85

The Riley MkXI, and its evolutions and derivatives, the Riley MkXX, the Riley MkXXII, and the Riley MkXXVI, are a series of Daytona Prototype race cars, designed, developed and built by Riley Technologies, between 2003 and 2016. Between 2003 and 2016, the cars scored a combined total of 84 race wins, achieved 106 podium finishes, and clinched 85 pole positions.

== List of engines used ==
Riley MkXI
Manufacturer	Name	Size	Type	Configuration
BMW		4.3 L (4,300 cc)	Naturally aspirated	V8
Dinan (BMW)	S62B50	4.9 L (4,939 cc)	Naturally aspirated	V8
Ford		5.0 L (4,950 cc)	Naturally aspirated	V8
GM (Pontiac)	LS6	5.5 L (5,500 cc)	Naturally aspirated	V8
GM (Pontiac)	LS6	5.0 L (4,988 cc)	Naturally aspirated	V8
Honda			Naturally aspirated	
Lexus (Toyota)	3UZ-FE	4.3 L (4,292 cc)	Naturally aspirated	V8
Lexus		5.0 L (4,987 cc)	Naturally aspirated	V8
Lozano Brothers Porting (Porsche)	M48	5.0 L (4,950 cc)	Naturally aspirated	V8
Porsche		4.0 L (3,990 cc)	Naturally aspirated	Flat-6

Riley MkXX
Manufacturer	Name	Size	Type	Configuration
Dinan (BMW)	S62B50	4.9 L (4,939 cc)	Naturally aspirated	V8
Ford		5.0 L (4,950 cc)	Naturally aspirated	V8
GM (Pontiac)	LS6	5.0 L (4,988 cc)	Naturally aspirated	V8
Lexus		5.0 L (4,987 cc)	Naturally aspirated	V8
Lozano Brothers Porting (Porsche)	M48	5.0 L (4,950 cc)	Naturally aspirated	V8

Riley MkXXVI
Manufacturer	Name	Size	Type	Configuration
Dinan (BMW)	S62B50	4.9 L (4,939 cc)	Naturally aspirated	V8
Ford		5.0 L (4,950 cc)	Naturally aspirated	V8
Ford	Ecoboost	3.5 L (3,496 cc)	Turbocharged	V6
Honda	HR35TT	3.5 L (3,500 cc)	Turbocharged	V6
