= 2005 Rolex Sports Car Series =

6th season of the racing series organized by Grand-Am

Seasons
- ← 2004 2006 →

The 2005 Rolex Sports Car Series season was the sixth season of the Rolex Sports Car Series run by the Grand American Road Racing Association, and the fourth season under the sponsorship of Rolex. It began on February 5 with the 24 Hours of Daytona, and ended on November 5 with the Mexico City 250.

The 2005 season saw another reduction of classes for the fourth year in a row with the suppression of the Super Grand Sport (SGS) class after just one season. The format was thus reduced to two classes, Daytona Prototypes (DP) and Grand Touring (GT).

== Schedule ==
The schedule was expanded to 14 races with the addition of new events at Mazda Raceway Laguna Seca and the Autódromo Hermanos Rodríguez, for the series' first venture outside of the United States and Canada. Held in support of Champ Car's Gran Premio Telmex-Tecate, it held the season finale, which changed for the second year in a row.

As a result, the race at California Speedway was moved to April, and the Phoenix 250 to September, with this event being split into separate races for the DP and the GT classes. The second race at Homestead–Miami Speedway was discontinued after one year, and replaced by a third visit to Watkins Glen International, as a support event for the return of the Watkins Glen Indy Grand Prix.

Rnd	Race	Length	Circuit	Location	Date
1	(United States) Rolex 24 at Daytona	24 hours	Daytona International Speedway	Daytona Beach, Florida	February 5–6
2	(United States) Grand Prix of Miami	250 miles	Homestead–Miami Speedway	Homestead, Florida	March 5
3	(United States) Ferrari Maserati 400	400 km	California Speedway	Fontana, California	April 3
4	(United States) Road & Track 250	250 miles	Mazda Raceway Laguna Seca	Monterey, California	May 1
5	(Canada) 6 Hours of Mont-Tremblant	6 hours	Circuit Mont-Tremblant	Mont-Tremblant, Quebec	May 21
6	(United States) Sahlen's Six Hours of the Glen	6 hours	Watkins Glen International	Watkins Glen, New York	June 12
7	(United States) Brumos Porsche 250	250 miles	Daytona International Speedway	Daytona Beach, Florida	June 30
8	(United States) Porsche 250	250 miles	Barber Motorsports Park	Birmingham, Alabama	July 31
9	(United States) CompUSA 200 at the Glen	200 miles	Watkins Glen International	Watkins Glen, New York	August 12
10	(United States) EMCO Gears Classic	250 miles	Mid-Ohio Sports Car Course	Lexington, Ohio	August 27
11	(United States) Phoenix 250^{†}	250 miles	Phoenix International Raceway	Avondale, Arizona	September 9 (GT); September 10 (DP)
12	(United States) Crown Royal 250 at the Glen	250 miles	Watkins Glen International	Watkins Glen, New York	September 24
13	(United States) VIR 400	400 km	Virginia International Raceway	Alton, Virginia	October 9
14	Mexico City 250	250 miles	Autódromo Hermanos Rodríguez	Mexico City, Mexico	November 5

† - The DP and GT classes ran separate, individual races at Phoenix.

== Entries ==
=== Daytona Prototype (DP) ===
Team	Chassis	Engine	No.	Drivers	Rounds
(United States) CITGO - Howard-Boss Motorsports (United States) Howard-Boss Motorsports	Crawford DP03	Pontiac	2	(Venezuela) Milka Duno	All
(United States) CITGO - Howard-Boss Motorsports (United States) Howard-Boss Motorsports	Crawford DP03	Pontiac	2	(United Kingdom) Andy Wallace	2–6, 8, 10–14
(United States) CITGO - Howard-Boss Motorsports (United States) Howard-Boss Motorsports	Crawford DP03	Pontiac	2	(Netherlands) Jan Lammers	5–7, 9
(United States) CITGO - Howard-Boss Motorsports (United States) Howard-Boss Motorsports	Crawford DP03	Pontiac	2	(United Kingdom) Dario Franchitti	1
(United States) CITGO - Howard-Boss Motorsports (United States) Howard-Boss Motorsports	Crawford DP03	Pontiac	2	(United Kingdom) Marino Franchitti	1
(United States) CITGO - Howard-Boss Motorsports (United States) Howard-Boss Motorsports	Crawford DP03	Pontiac	2	(United Kingdom) Dan Wheldon	1
(United States) CITGO - Howard-Boss Motorsports (United States) Howard-Boss Motorsports	Crawford DP03	Pontiac	4	(United States) Elliott Forbes-Robinson	All
(United States) CITGO - Howard-Boss Motorsports (United States) Howard-Boss Motorsports	Crawford DP03	Pontiac	4	(United States) Butch Leitzinger	All
(United States) CITGO - Howard-Boss Motorsports (United States) Howard-Boss Motorsports	Crawford DP03	Pontiac	4	(United States) Jimmie Johnson	1
(United States) CITGO - Howard-Boss Motorsports (United States) Howard-Boss Motorsports	Crawford DP03	Pontiac	20	(United States) Tony Stewart	1, 7, 9
(United States) CITGO - Howard-Boss Motorsports (United States) Howard-Boss Motorsports	Crawford DP03	Pontiac	20	(United Kingdom) Andy Wallace	1, 7, 9
(United States) CITGO - Howard-Boss Motorsports (United States) Howard-Boss Motorsports	Crawford DP03	Pontiac	20	(Netherlands) Jan Lammers	1
(United States) CITGO - Howard-Boss Motorsports (United States) Howard-Boss Motorsports	Crawford DP03	Pontiac	20	(United States) Paul Edwards	3
(United States) CITGO - Howard-Boss Motorsports (United States) Howard-Boss Motorsports	Crawford DP03	Pontiac	20	(United States) Chris Dyson	3
(United States) CITGO - Howard-Boss Motorsports (United States) Howard-Boss Motorsports	Crawford DP03	Pontiac	06	(United States) Chris Dyson	6, 9, 12–13
(United States) CITGO - Howard-Boss Motorsports (United States) Howard-Boss Motorsports	Crawford DP03	Pontiac	06	(United States) Harrison Brix	6–7, 9, 12–13
(United States) CITGO - Howard-Boss Motorsports (United States) Howard-Boss Motorsports	Crawford DP03	Pontiac	06	(United States) Rob Dyson	6–7, 12
(United States) Cegwa Sports / Southard Motorsports (United States) Southard Motorsports	Fabcar FDSC/03 (round 1); Riley MkXI	Lexus (round 1); BMW	3	(United States) Darius Grala	All
(United States) Cegwa Sports / Southard Motorsports (United States) Southard Motorsports	Fabcar FDSC/03 (round 1); Riley MkXI	Lexus (round 1); BMW	3	(United States) Shane Lewis	All
(United States) Cegwa Sports / Southard Motorsports (United States) Southard Motorsports	Fabcar FDSC/03 (round 1); Riley MkXI	Lexus (round 1); BMW	3	(United States) Bohdan Kroczek	1
(United States) Cegwa Sports / Southard Motorsports (United States) Southard Motorsports	Fabcar FDSC/03 (round 1); Riley MkXI	Lexus (round 1); BMW	3	(South Africa) Mark Patterson	1
(United States) Cegwa Sports / Southard Motorsports (United States) Southard Motorsports	Fabcar FDSC/03 (round 1); Riley MkXI	Lexus (round 1); BMW	3	(United States) Quentin Wahl	1
(United States) Essex Racing	Crawford DP03	Ford	5	(United States) James Gue	1, 7, 11
(United States) Essex Racing	Crawford DP03	Ford	5	(United States) Harrison Brix	1
(United States) Essex Racing	Crawford DP03	Ford	5	(United States) Chris Dyson	1
(United States) Essex Racing	Crawford DP03	Ford	5	(United States) Rob Dyson	1
(United States) Essex Racing	Crawford DP03	Ford	5	(United States) Joe Pruskowski	2–5
(United States) Essex Racing	Crawford DP03	Ford	5	(United States) Justin Pruskowski	2–5
(United States) Essex Racing	Crawford DP03	Ford	5	(Canada) Ross Bentley	5
(United States) Essex Racing	Crawford DP03	Ford	5	(United States) Dominic Cicero	6–7
(United States) Essex Racing	Crawford DP03	Ford	5	(Mexico) Jorge Goeters	6, 9
(United States) Essex Racing	Crawford DP03	Ford	5	(United States) Tom Nastasi	6
(United States) Essex Racing	Crawford DP03	Ford	5	(United States) Colin Braun	8, 13
(United States) Essex Racing	Crawford DP03	Ford	5	(United States) Brad Coleman	8, 13
(United States) Essex Racing	Crawford DP03	Ford	5	(Mexico) Eduardo Goeters	9
(United States) Essex Racing	Crawford DP03	Ford	5	(United States) Rob Morgan	10–11
(United States) Essex Racing	Crawford DP03	Ford	5	(United States) Charles Morgan	10
(United States) Essex Racing	Crawford DP03	Ford	5	(United States) Patrick Flanagan	12
(United States) Essex Racing	Crawford DP03	Ford	5	(United States) Patrick Long	12
(United States) Essex Racing	Crawford DP03	Ford	5	(United States) Rob Finlay	14
(United States) Essex Racing	Crawford DP03	Ford	5	(Canada) Michael Valiante	14
(United States) Michael Shank Racing	Riley MkXI	Pontiac	6	(United States) Mike Borkowski	All
(United States) Michael Shank Racing	Riley MkXI	Pontiac	6	(United States) Paul Mears Jr.	1–3, 6–7, 10, 12–13
(United States) Michael Shank Racing	Riley MkXI	Pontiac	6	(Canada) Ken Wilden	4–5, 8–9, 14
(United States) Michael Shank Racing	Riley MkXI	Pontiac	6	(United States) Duncan Dayton	1, 5–6
(United States) Michael Shank Racing	Riley MkXI	Pontiac	6	(United States) Larry Connor	1
(United States) Michael Shank Racing	Riley MkXI	Pontiac	6	(Brazil) Oswaldo Negri Jr.	11
(United States) Michael Shank Racing	Riley MkXI	Lexus	60	(Brazil) Oswaldo Negri Jr.	4, 10, 12–14
(United States) Michael Shank Racing	Riley MkXI	Lexus	60	(South Africa) Mark Patterson	4, 10, 12–14
(United States) Tuttle Team Racing / SAMAX	Riley MkXI	Pontiac	7	(United States) Brian Tuttle	7–10, 12–14
(United States) Tuttle Team Racing / SAMAX	Riley MkXI	Pontiac	7	(United States) Kyle Petty	7, 9
(United States) Tuttle Team Racing / SAMAX	Riley MkXI	Pontiac	7	(United States) Tony Ave	7
(United States) Tuttle Team Racing / SAMAX	Riley MkXI	Pontiac	7	(France) Jonathan Cochet	8, 10
(United States) Tuttle Team Racing / SAMAX	Riley MkXI	Pontiac	7	(Belgium) Bas Leinders	12
(United States) Tuttle Team Racing / SAMAX	Riley MkXI	Pontiac	7	(United States) Bryan Sellers	13
(United States) Tuttle Team Racing / SAMAX	Riley MkXI	Pontiac	7	(Brazil) Mário Haberfeld	14
(United States) Synergy Racing	Doran JE4	BMW	8	(United States) Brian Frisselle	All
(United States) Synergy Racing	Doran JE4	BMW	8	(United States) Burt Frisselle	All
(United States) Synergy Racing	Doran JE4	BMW	8	(Brazil) Thomas Erdos	1
(United States) Synergy Racing	Doran JE4	BMW	8	(United Kingdom) Mike Newton	1
(United States) Synergy Racing	Picchio DP2	BMW	86	(United States) Steve Marshall	1
(United States) Synergy Racing	Picchio DP2	BMW	86	(United States) Peyton Sellers	1
(United States) Synergy Racing	Picchio DP2	BMW	86	(United States) Arthur Urciuoli	1
(United States) Synergy Racing	Picchio DP2	BMW	86	(United States) Jason Workman	1
(United States) Hyper Sport	Doran JE4	Infiniti	9	(United States) Joe Foster	1–2, 4
(United States) Hyper Sport	Doran JE4	Infiniti	9	(United States) Rick Skelton	1–2, 4
(United States) Hyper Sport	Doran JE4	Infiniti	9	(United States) David Donner	1
(United States) Hyper Sport	Doran JE4	Infiniti	9	(United States) Blake Rosser	1
(United States) Hyper Sport	Doran JE4	Infiniti	9	(United States) B. J. Zacharias	1
(United States) Suntrust Racing	Riley MkXI	Pontiac	10	(Italy) Max Angelelli	All
(United States) Suntrust Racing	Riley MkXI	Pontiac	10	(South Africa) Wayne Taylor	All
(United States) Suntrust Racing	Riley MkXI	Pontiac	10	(France) Emmanuel Collard	1
(United States) Chase Competition Engineering/CB Motorsports (United States) CB Motorsports	Riley MkXI	Lexus (rounds 3–7); Pontiac	15	(Canada) Hugo Guenette	3–7, 9–13
(United States) Chase Competition Engineering/CB Motorsports (United States) CB Motorsports	Riley MkXI	Lexus (rounds 3–7); Pontiac	15	(United States) Chris Bingham	3–7, 9–11, 13
(United States) Chase Competition Engineering/CB Motorsports (United States) CB Motorsports	Riley MkXI	Lexus (rounds 3–7); Pontiac	15	(Canada) Jacques Guenette	5–6
(United States) Chase Competition Engineering/CB Motorsports (United States) CB Motorsports	Riley MkXI	Pontiac	15	(United States) Terry Borcheller	12–13
(United States) Chase Competition Engineering/CB Motorsports (United States) CB Motorsports	Chase CCE-001	Pontiac	18	(United States) Chris Bingham	1–2
(United States) Chase Competition Engineering/CB Motorsports (United States) CB Motorsports	Chase CCE-001	Pontiac	18	(United States) Johnny Miller	1, 13
(United States) Chase Competition Engineering/CB Motorsports (United States) CB Motorsports	Chase CCE-001	Pontiac	18	(Canada) Tony Burgess	1
(United States) Chase Competition Engineering/CB Motorsports (United States) CB Motorsports	Chase CCE-001	Pontiac	18	(United States) Steven Ivankovich	1
(United States) Chase Competition Engineering/CB Motorsports (United States) CB Motorsports	Chase CCE-001	Pontiac	18	(United States) Vic Rice	1
(United States) Chase Competition Engineering/CB Motorsports (United States) CB Motorsports	Chase CCE-001	Pontiac	18	(Canada) Hugo Guenette	2
(United States) Chase Competition Engineering/CB Motorsports (United States) CB Motorsports	Chase CCE-001	Pontiac	18	(United States) Zach Arnold	13
(United States) Ten Motorsports (United States) Finlay Motorsports	Riley MkXI	BMW	19	(United States) Michael McDowell	1–11, 13–14
(United States) Ten Motorsports (United States) Finlay Motorsports	Riley MkXI	BMW	19	(United States) Memo Gidley	1–2, 4–14
(United States) Ten Motorsports (United States) Finlay Motorsports	Riley MkXI	BMW	19	(Canada) Michael Valiante	1, 3, 12
(United States) Ten Motorsports (United States) Finlay Motorsports	Riley MkXI	BMW	19	(United States) Jonathan Bomarito	1
(United States) Westernesse Racing	Crawford DP03	Ford	25	(United States) Dominic Cicero	2–4
(United States) Westernesse Racing	Crawford DP03	Ford	25	(United States) Chad McQueen	2–4
(United States) Brumos Racing (United States) Red Bull Brumos Racing	Fabcar FDSC/03	Porsche	29	(United States) Brady Refenning	1
(United States) Brumos Racing (United States) Red Bull Brumos Racing	Fabcar FDSC/03	Porsche	29	(United States) Jake Vargo	1
(United States) Brumos Racing (United States) Red Bull Brumos Racing	Fabcar FDSC/03	Porsche	29	(United States) Josh Vargo	1
(United States) Brumos Racing (United States) Red Bull Brumos Racing	Fabcar FDSC/03	Porsche	29	(United States) Tim Vargo	1
(United States) Brumos Racing (United States) Red Bull Brumos Racing	Fabcar FDSC/03	Porsche	58	(United States) David Donohue	All
(United States) Brumos Racing (United States) Red Bull Brumos Racing	Fabcar FDSC/03	Porsche	58	(United States) Darren Law	All
(United States) Brumos Racing (United States) Red Bull Brumos Racing	Fabcar FDSC/03	Porsche	58	(Germany) Sascha Maassen	1, 5
(United States) Brumos Racing (United States) Red Bull Brumos Racing	Fabcar FDSC/03	Porsche	58	(Germany) Lucas Luhr	1, 6
(United States) Brumos Racing (United States) Red Bull Brumos Racing	Fabcar FDSC/03	Porsche	59	(Germany) Lucas Luhr	5
(United States) Brumos Racing (United States) Red Bull Brumos Racing	Fabcar FDSC/03	Porsche	59	(United States) J. C. France	All
(United States) Brumos Racing (United States) Red Bull Brumos Racing	Fabcar FDSC/03	Porsche	59	(United States) Hurley Haywood	All
(United States) Brumos Racing (United States) Red Bull Brumos Racing	Fabcar FDSC/03	Porsche	59	(Germany) Timo Bernhard	1, 6
(United States) Brumos Racing (United States) Red Bull Brumos Racing	Fabcar FDSC/03	Porsche	59	(France) Romain Dumas	1
(United States) Brumos Racing (United States) Red Bull Brumos Racing	Fabcar FDSC/03	Porsche	59	(Germany) Mike Rockenfeller	1
(United States) Margraf Racing	Riley MkXI	Pontiac	31	(United States) Charles Morgan	4
(United States) Margraf Racing	Riley MkXI	Pontiac	31	(United States) Rob Morgan	4
(United States) Margraf Racing	Riley MkXI	Pontiac	31	(United States) Tony Ave	13
(United States) Margraf Racing	Riley MkXI	Pontiac	31	(United States) Skip Cummins	13
(United States) Orbit Racing	Riley MkXI	Pontiac	39	(United Kingdom) Guy Smith	1–7
(United States) Orbit Racing	Riley MkXI	Pontiac	39	(United States) Jim Matthews	1–5, 7
(United States) Orbit Racing	Riley MkXI	Pontiac	39	(Germany) Marcel Tiemann	5–6
(United States) Orbit Racing	Riley MkXI	Pontiac	39	(Belgium) Marc Goossens	1
(United States) Orbit Racing	Riley MkXI	Pontiac	39	(United States) Scott Sharp	1
(United States) ADI Motorsports	Picchio DP2	BMW	40	(United States) Shawn Bayliff	13
(United States) ADI Motorsports	Picchio DP2	BMW	40	(United States) Derek Hill	13
(United States) Doran Racing (United States) Doran Labonte Racing	Doran JE4	Pontiac	44	(United States) Bobby Labonte	1, 7–9
(United States) Doran Racing (United States) Doran Labonte Racing	Doran JE4	Pontiac	44	(United States) Terry Labonte	1, 7, 9
(United States) Doran Racing (United States) Doran Labonte Racing	Doran JE4	Pontiac	44	(United States) Bryan Herta	1
(United States) Doran Racing (United States) Doran Labonte Racing	Doran JE4	Pontiac	44	(Denmark) Jan Magnussen	1
(United States) Doran Racing (United States) Doran Labonte Racing	Doran JE4	Pontiac	44	(Brazil) Roberto Moreno	8
(United States) Doran Racing (United States) Doran Labonte Racing	Doran JE4	Lexus (rounds 1–7); Ford	77	(Italy) Matteo Bobbi	All
(United States) Doran Racing (United States) Doran Labonte Racing	Doran JE4	Lexus (rounds 1–7); Ford	77	(Italy) Fabrizio Gollin	All
(United States) Doran Racing (United States) Doran Labonte Racing	Doran JE4	Lexus (rounds 1–7); Ford	77	(Belgium) Didier Theys	1
(Canada) Multimatic Motorsports	Multimatic MDP1	Ford	49	(United States) Greg Biffle	1
(Canada) Multimatic Motorsports	Multimatic MDP1	Ford	49	(United States) Kurt Busch	1
(Canada) Multimatic Motorsports	Multimatic MDP1	Ford	49	(United States) Matt Kenseth	1
(Canada) Multimatic Motorsports	Multimatic MDP1	Ford	49	(Canada) Scott Maxwell	1
(United States) Blackforest Motorsports	Multimatic MDP1	Ford	50	(United States) Jeff Bucknum	1
(United States) Blackforest Motorsports	Multimatic MDP1	Ford	50	(United States) Travis Duder	1
(United States) Blackforest Motorsports	Multimatic MDP1	Ford	50	(United States) Tom Nastasi	1
(United States) Blackforest Motorsports	Multimatic MDP1	Ford	50	(United States) Doug Peterson	1
(United States) Blackforest Motorsports	Multimatic MDP1	Ford	50	(United States) Henri Zogaib	1
(United States) Kodak-Bell Motorsports	Doran JE4	Pontiac	54	(United States) Terry Borcheller	1–11
(United States) Kodak-Bell Motorsports	Doran JE4	Pontiac	54	(Germany) Ralf Kelleners	1, 3–11
(United States) Kodak-Bell Motorsports	Doran JE4	Pontiac	54	(Brazil) Christian Fittipaldi	1–2
(United States) Kodak-Bell Motorsports	Doran JE4	Pontiac	54	(United States) Forest Barber	1, 6
(United States) Kodak-Bell Motorsports	Doran JE4	Pontiac	54	(Canada) Paul Tracy	1
(United States) Krohn Racing/TRG	Riley MkXI	Pontiac	66	(Germany) Jörg Bergmeister	All
(United States) Krohn Racing/TRG	Riley MkXI	Pontiac	66	(Italy) Max Papis	1–2, 4, 7, 10, 12–14
(United States) Krohn Racing/TRG	Riley MkXI	Pontiac	66	(Brazil) Christian Fittipaldi	3, 5–6, 8–9, 11
(United States) Krohn Racing/TRG	Riley MkXI	Pontiac	66	(United Kingdom) Oliver Gavin	1
(United States) Krohn Racing/TRG	Riley MkXI	Pontiac	67	(Sweden) Niclas Jönsson	All
(United States) Krohn Racing/TRG	Riley MkXI	Pontiac	67	(United States) Tracy Krohn	1–10, 12–14
(United States) Krohn Racing/TRG	Riley MkXI	Pontiac	67	(Mexico) Jimmy Morales	1
(United States) Krohn Racing/TRG	Riley MkXI	Pontiac	67	(United States) Buddy Rice	1
(United States) Krohn Racing/TRG	Riley MkXI	Pontiac	67	(United States) Boris Said	1
(United States) Krohn Racing/TRG	Riley MkXI	Pontiac	67	(Italy) Max Papis	11
(United States) Robinson Racing	Riley MkXI	Lexus	74	(United States) Wally Dallenbach Jr.	1
(United States) Robinson Racing	Riley MkXI	Lexus	74	(United States) Paul Dallenbach	1
(United States) Robinson Racing	Riley MkXI	Lexus	74	(United States) George Robinson	1
(United States) Robinson Racing	Riley MkXI	Lexus	74	(United States) Johnny Unser	1
(United States) Newman/Haas Racing / Silverstone Racing	Crawford DP03	Ford	79	(United States) Mike Brockman	1
(United States) Newman/Haas Racing / Silverstone Racing	Crawford DP03	Ford	79	(France) Sébastien Bourdais	1
(United States) Newman/Haas Racing / Silverstone Racing	Crawford DP03	Ford	79	(Brazil) Cristiano da Matta	1
(United States) Newman/Haas Racing / Silverstone Racing	Crawford DP03	Ford	79	(United States) Paul Newman	1
(United States) Pacific Coast Motorsports	Riley MkXI	Pontiac	89	(United Kingdom) Ryan Dalziel	14
(United States) Pacific Coast Motorsports	Riley MkXI	Pontiac	89	(United States) Alex Figge	14
(United States) Gainsco/Blackhawk Racing	Riley MkXI	Pontiac	99	(United States) Alex Gurney	4, 7–14
(United States) Gainsco/Blackhawk Racing	Riley MkXI	Pontiac	99	(United States) Bob Stallings	4, 7–14
(United States) CompUSA Chip Ganassi with Felix Sabates	Riley MkXI	Lexus	01	(Mexico) Luis Díaz	All
(United States) CompUSA Chip Ganassi with Felix Sabates	Riley MkXI	Lexus	01	(United States) Scott Pruett	All
(United States) CompUSA Chip Ganassi with Felix Sabates	Riley MkXI	Lexus	01	(Australia) Ryan Briscoe	1
(United States) New Century Mtg / Chip Ganassi with Sabates	Riley MkXI	Lexus	02	(Sweden) Stefan Johansson	All
(United States) New Century Mtg / Chip Ganassi with Sabates	Riley MkXI	Lexus	02	(United States) Cort Wagner	All
(United States) New Century Mtg / Chip Ganassi with Sabates	Riley MkXI	Lexus	02	(United States) Jamie McMurray	1
(United States) Target Chip Ganassi with Felix Sabates	Riley MkXI	Lexus	03	(New Zealand) Scott Dixon	1
(United States) Target Chip Ganassi with Felix Sabates	Riley MkXI	Lexus	03	(United Kingdom) Darren Manning	1
(United States) Target Chip Ganassi with Felix Sabates	Riley MkXI	Lexus	03	(United States) Casey Mears	1
(United States) Spirit of Daytona Racing	Crawford DP03	Pontiac	07	(Brazil) Roberto Moreno	2, 5–7, 11
(United States) Spirit of Daytona Racing	Crawford DP03	Pontiac	07	(United States) Bob Ward	2, 5–7, 11
(United States) Spirit of Daytona Racing	Crawford DP03	Pontiac	07	(United States) Henri Zogaib	5–6
(United States) Spirit of Daytona Racing	Crawford DP03	Pontiac	09	(United States) Doug Goad	All
(United States) Spirit of Daytona Racing	Crawford DP03	Pontiac	09	(France) Stéphan Grégoire	1–8
(United States) Spirit of Daytona Racing	Crawford DP03	Pontiac	09	(Canada) Marc-Antoine Camirand	5, 9–14
(United States) Spirit of Daytona Racing	Crawford DP03	Pontiac	09	(Brazil) Roberto Moreno	1
(United States) Spirit of Daytona Racing	Crawford DP03	Pontiac	09	(United States) Bob Ward	1

== Results ==
Overall winners in bold.

Rnd	Circuit	DP Winning Teams	GT Winning Teams
Rnd	Circuit	DP Winning Drivers	GT Winning Drivers
1	Daytona	**(United States) #10 SunTrust Racing**	(United States) #71 Farnbacher Racing USA
1	Daytona	**(Italy) Max Angelelli** **(South Africa) Wayne Taylor** **(France) Emmanuel Collard**	(Germany) Wolf Henzler (Germany) Dominik Farnbacher (Germany) Pierre Ehret (United States) Shawn Price
2	Homestead	**(United States) #10 SunTrust Racing**	(United States) #65 Auto Gallery/TRG
2	Homestead	**(Italy) Max Angelelli** **(South Africa) Wayne Taylor**	(United States) Marc Bunting (United States) Andy Lally
3	California	**(United States) #01 CompUSA Chip Ganassi with Felix Sabates**	(United States) #21 Prototype Technology Group
3	California	**(Mexico) Luis Díaz** **(United States) Scott Pruett**	(United States) Bill Auberlen (United States) Joey Hand
4	Laguna Seca	**(United States) #01 CompUSA Chip Ganassi with Felix Sabates**	(United States) #16 Prototype Technology Group
4	Laguna Seca	**(Mexico) Luis Díaz** **(United States) Scott Pruett**	(United States) Bill Auberlen (United States) Tom Milner (United States) Justin Marks
5	Mont-Tremblant	**(United States) #2 CITGO Howard-Boss Motorsports**	(United States) #22 Prototype Technology Group
5	Mont-Tremblant	**(Venezuela) Milka Duno** **(United Kingdom) Andy Wallace** **(Netherlands) Jan Lammers**	(United States) Ian James (United States) Joey Hand
6	Watkins Glen	**(United States) #67 Krohn Racing/TRG**	(United States) #14 Autometrics Motorsports
6	Watkins Glen	**(United States) Tracy Krohn** **(Sweden) Niclas Jönsson**	(Germany) Wolf Henzler (United States) Leh Keen (United States) Cory Friedman
7	Daytona	**(United States) #4 Howard-Boss Motorsports**	(United States) #16 Prototype Technology Group
7	Daytona	**(United States) Elliot Forbes-Robinson** **(United States) Butch Leitzinger**	(United States) Bill Auberlen (United States) Justin Marks
8	Barber	**(United States) #10 SunTrust Racing**	(United States) #16 Prototype Technology Group
8	Barber	**(Italy) Max Angelelli** **(South Africa) Wayne Taylor**	(United States) Bill Auberlen (United States) Justin Marks
9	Watkins Glen	**(United States) #10 SunTrust Racing**	(United States) #64 TRG
9	Watkins Glen	**(Italy) Max Angelelli** **(South Africa) Wayne Taylor**	(United States) Paul Edwards (Denmark) Jan Magnussen
10	Mid-Ohio	**(United States) #4 Howard-Boss Motorsports**	(United States) #21 Prototype Technology Group
10	Mid-Ohio	**(United States) Elliot Forbes-Robinson** **(United States) Butch Leitzinger**	(United States) Kelly Collins (United States) Tom Milner
11^{†}	Phoenix	**(United States)** #66 Krohn Racing/TRG	(United States) #64 TRG
11^{†}	Phoenix	(Germany) Jörg Bergmeister (Brazil) Christian Fittipaldi	(United States) Paul Edwards (Denmark) Jan Magnussen
12	Watkins Glen	**(United States) #10 SunTrust Racing**	(United States) #65 TRG
12	Watkins Glen	**(Italy) Max Angelelli** **(South Africa) Wayne Taylor**	(United States) Marc Bunting (United States) Andy Lally
13	Virginia	**(United States) #01 CompUSA Chip Ganassi with Felix Sabates**	(United States) #21 Prototype Technology Group
13	Virginia	**(Mexico) Luis Díaz** **(United States) Scott Pruett**	(United States) Bill Auberlen (United States) Tom Milner
14	Mexico City	**(United States) #19 Finlay Motorsports**	(United States) #64 TRG
14	Mexico City	**(United States) Michael McDowell** **(United States) Memo Gidley**	(United States) Paul Edwards (Denmark) Jan Magnussen

† - The DP and GT classes ran separate, individual races for DP and GT.

== Championship standings ==
Championship points are awarded in each class at the finish of each event. Points are awarded based on finishing positions in the race as shown in the chart below.

Position	1	2	3	4	5	6	7	8	9	10	11	12	13	14	15	16	17	18	19	20	21	22	23	24	25	26	27	28	29	30+
Points	35	32	30	28	26	25	24	23	22	21	20	19	18	17	16	15	14	13	12	11	10	9	8	7	6	5	4	3	2	1

=== Drivers' Championships ===
==== Standings: Daytona Prototypes (DP) ====
Pos.	Drivers	DAY	HMS	FON	LGA	MTR	WGL	DAY	BAR	WGL	MDO	PHX	WGL	VIR	MEX	Points
1	(Italy) Max Angelelli (South Africa) Wayne Taylor	1	1	2	4	6	**6**	**2**	1	1	3	2	1	**4**	2	439
2	(United States) Scott Pruett (Mexico) Luis Díaz	**7**	5	**1**	1	**3**	3	6	4	4	2	16	**2**	1	3	405
3	(United States) Butch Leitzinger (United States) Elliott Forbes-Robinson	2	2	16	2	11	7	1	11	5	1	3	15	14	5	360
4	(Germany) Jorg Bergmeister	10	3	10	10	5	2	3	9	3	5	1	17	11	9	350
5	(Sweden) Stefan Johansson (United States) Cort Wagner	4	7	6	17	2	5	13	7	7	13	4	6	5	4	340
6	(United States) Memo Gidley	19	10		7	4	4	4	2	20	4	6	5	20	**1**	309
7	(United States) Michael McDowell	19	10	7	7	4	4	4	2	20	4	6		20	**1**	307
8	(Venezuela) Milka Duno	16	9	4	13	1	12	5	20	6	20	9	21	2	20	285
9	(Sweden) Niclas Jönsson	11	4	5	16	18	1	8	19	23	6	19	10	21	7	272
10	(United States) Mike Borkowski	22	13	3	5	13	19	16	3	9	21	5	7	16	8	268
11	(Italy) Matteo Bobbi (Italy) Fabrizio Gollin	5	11	14	11	17	14	22	10	**10**	8	14	19	3	10	268
12	(United States) David Donohue (United States) Darren Law	8	**8**	9	14	7	21	7	6	8	19	8	18	18	16	267
13	(United Kingdom) Andy Wallace	3	9	4	13	1	12	18	20	21	20	9	21	2	20	261
14	(United States) Darius Grala (United States) Shane Lewis	14	12	11	8	15	11	14	17	22	10	11	13	6	14	256
15	(United States) Tracy Krohn	11	4	5	16	18	1	8	19	23	6		10	21	7	247
16	(United States) Terry Borcheller	23	6	8	3	10	17	25	5	12	12	**15**	4	23		243
17	(United States) Brian Frisselle (United States) Burt Frisselle	17	15	18	23	9	9	19	16	11	7	17	14	19	13	227
18	(United States) Hurley Haywood (United States) J. C. France	21	14	15	21	12	16	11	15	15	15	10	12	17	17	223
19	(United States) Doug Goad	28	19	19	19	8	15	10	18	13	16	13	16	15	18	207
20	(Brazil) Christian Fittipaldi	23	6	10		5	2		9	3		1				199
21	(Italy) Max Papis	10	3		10			3			5	19	17	11	9	196
22	(United States) Bob Stallings				6			9	**8**	2	**11**	18	11	24	8	182
23	(Germany) Ralf Kelleners	23		8	3	10	17	25	5	12	12	**15**				176
24	(United States) Alex Gurney				6			9	**8**	2	**11**	18	11	24	8	175
25	(Canada) Hugo Guenette		16	13	20	14	18	20		16	18	7	4	23		173
26	(United States) Chris Bingham	24	16	13	20	14	18	20		16	18	7		23		144
27	(Netherlands) Jan Lammers	3				1	12	5		6						135
28	(United States) Paul Mears Jr.	22	13	3			19	16			21		7	16		133
29	(Brazil) Oswaldo Negri Jr.				**9**						17	5	3	10	19	125
30	(United States) Brian Tuttle							17	12	19	9		8	12	15	125
31	(Canada) Marc-Antoine Camirand					8				13	16	13	16	15	18	118
32	(South Africa) Mark Patterson	14			**9**						17		3	10	19	116
33	(France) Stéphan Grégoire	28	19	19	19	8	15	10	18							112
34	(United States) Harrison Brix	13					13	21		17			20	7		95
35	(Canada) Ken Wilden				5	13			3	9					8	89
36	(United Kingdom) Guy Smith	26	20	20	12	19	8	23								89
37	(United States) Chris Dyson	13		21			13			17			20	7		84
38	(Canada) Michael Valiante	19		7									5		12	81
39	(Brazil) Roberto Moreno	28	18			16	10	24	14			28				80
40	(United States) Bobby Labonte	9						15	14	14						72
41	(United States) Dominic Cicero		17	12	22		20	12								72
42	(United States) Bob Ward	28	18			16	10	24				28				70
43	(United States) Rob Dyson	13					13	21					20			57
44	(United States) James Gue	13						12				12				56
45	(United States) Terry Labonte	9						15		14						55
46	(United States) Jim Matthews	26	20	20	12	19		23								54
47	(United States) Tony Stewart	3						18		21						53
48	(Germany) Lucas Luhr	8				12	21									52
49	(United States) Rob Morgan				15						14	12				52
50	(Germany) Sascha Maassen	8				7										47
51	(United States) Chad McQueen		17	12	22											42
52	(France) Jonathan Cochet								12		9					41
53	(United States) Colin Braun (United States) Brad Coleman								13					9		40
54	(United States) Henri Zogaib	27				16	10									40
55	(United States) Duncan Dayton	22				13	19									39
56	(United States) Joe Pruskowski (United States) Justin Pruskowski		22	17	18	DNS										36
57	(France) Emmanuel Collard	1														35
58	(United States) Charles Morgan				15						14					33
59	(United States) Jimmie Johnson	2														32
60	(United States) Tony Ave							17						13		32
61	(United States) Johnny Miller	24												8		30
62	(Canada) Jacques Guenette					14	18									30
63	(United States) Jamie McMurray	4														28
64	(Belgium) Didier Theys	5														26
65	(United States) Kyle Petty							17		19						26
66	(New Zealand) Scott Dixon (United Kingdom) Darren Manning (United States) Casey Mears	6														25
=	(United Kingdom) Ryan Dalziel (United States) Alex Figge														6	25
67	(Germany) Timo Bernhard	21					16									25
68	(Australia) Ryan Briscoe	**7**														24
69	(Mexico) Jorge Goeters						20			18						24
70	(Germany) Marcel Tiemann						8									23
=	(Belgium) Bas Leinders												8			23
=	(United States) Zach Arnold													8		23
71	(United States) Joe Foster (United States) Rick Skelton	18	21		DNS											23
72	(United States) Bryan Herta (Denmark) Jan Magnussen	9														22
=	(United States) Patrick Flanagan (United States) Patrick Long												9			22
73	(United Kingdom) Oliver Gavin	10														21
74	(Mexico) Jimmy Morales (United States) Buddy Rice (United States) Boris Said	11														20
75	(United States) Wally Dallenbach Jr. (United States) Paul Dallenbach (United States) George Robinson (United States) Johnny Unser	12														19
=	(United States) Bryan Sellers													12		19
=	(United States) Rob Finlay														12	19
76	(United States) Skip Cummins													13		18
77	(United States) Bohdan Kroczek (United States) Quentin Wahl	14														17
78	(United States) Greg Biffle (United States) Kurt Busch (United States) Matt Kenseth (Canada) Scott Maxwell	15														16
=	(Brazil) Mário Haberfeld														15	16
79	(United Kingdom) Dario Franchitti (United Kingdom) Marino Franchitti (United Kingdom) Dan Wheldon	16														15
80	(United States) Tom Nastasi	27					20									15
81	(Brazil) Thomas Erdos (United Kingdom) Mike Newton	17														14
82	(United States) David Donner (United States) Blake Rosser (United States) B. J. Zacharias	18														13
=	(Mexico) Eduardo Goeters									18						13
83	(United States) Jonathan Bomarito	19														12
84	(United States) Brady Refenning (United States) Jake Vargo (United States) Josh Vargo (United States) Tim Vargo	20														11
85	(France) Romain Dumas (Germany) Mike Rockenfeller	21														10
=	(United States) Paul Edwards			21												10
86	(United States) Larry Connor	22														9
=	(United States) Shawn Bayliff (United States) Derek Hill													22		9
87	(United States) Forest Barber	23					17									8
=	(Canada) Paul Tracy	23														8
88	(Canada) Tony Burgess (United States) Steven Ivankovich (United States) Vic Rice	24														7
89	(United States) Mike Brockman (France) Sébastien Bourdais (Brazil) Cristiano da Matta (United States) Paul Newman	25														6
90	(Belgium) Marc Goossens (United States) Scott Sharp	26														5
91	(United States) Jeff Bucknum (United States) Travis Duder (United States) Doug Peterson	27														4
92	(United States) Steve Marshall (United States) Peyton Sellers (United States) Arthur Urciuoli (United States) Jason Workman	29														2
Pos.	Drivers	DAY	HMS	FON	LGA	MTR	WGL	DAY	BAR	WGL	MDO	PHX	WGL	VIR	MEX	Points

Colour	Result
Gold	Winner
Silver	Second place
Bronze	Third place
Green	Points classification
Blue	Non-points classification
Blue	Non-classified finish (NC)
Purple	Retired, not classified (Ret)
Red	Did not qualify (DNQ)
Red	Did not pre-qualify (DNPQ)
Black	Disqualified (DSQ)
White	Did not start (DNS)
White	Withdrew (WD)
White	Race cancelled (C)
Blank	Did not practice (DNP)
Blank	Did not arrive (DNA)
Blank	Excluded (EX)

**Bold** - Pole position

Italics - Fastest lap

==== Standings: Grand Touring (GT) - Top 10 ====
Pos	Driver	Points
1	(United States) Craig Stanton	377
2	(United States) Marc Bunting	376
2	(United States) Andy Lally	376
3	(United States) David Murry	359
4	(United States) Joey Hand	337
8	(United States) Leh Keen	333
8	(United States) Cory Friedman	333
6	(United States) Tommy Milner	323
7	(United States) Justin Marks	323
8	(United States) Bill Auberlen	321
9	(United States) Jim Tafel Jr.	307
9	(United States) Andrew Davis	307
10	(United States) Ian James	282
