= Grand Sport =

Grand Sport may refer to:

- Grand Sport Records, a Norwegian record label
- Grand Sport Group, a sports equipment company based in Thailand
- Grand Sport, models of Chevrolet Corvette
  - A 1963 model of Chevrolet Corvette (C2)
  - A 1996 model of Chevrolet Corvette (C4)
  - A 2010 model of Chevrolet Corvette (C6)
  - A 2017 model of Chevrolet Corvette (C7)
  - A 2027 model of Chevrolet Corvette (C8)
- Grand Sport, a model of Bugatti Veyron
- Grand Sport (class), a former race car class, sanctioned by the SCCA, Grand-Am, and IMSA

== See also ==
- Buick Gran Sport, a car
