= Henri Zogaib =

Henri Zogaib (5 July 1973 - 20 October 2024 Beirut, Lebanon) was a Lebanese-born American racing driver and convicted scam artist. Zogaib primarily ran in the Rolex Sports Car Series.

== Racing career ==
After graduating from the Skip Barber Racing School, Zogaib's first appearance in professional auto racing came at California Speedway in the Grand-Am Cup. The Daytona Beach, Florida resident joined Schuitemaker Motorsports in the GS class. With teammate J. C. France the duo finished their Nissan 350Z thirteenth overall, twelfth in class. The Lebanese born driver again joined the team during the 2005 race at Watkins Glen International. This time, Zogaib was joined by Murray Marden to score a 43rd-place finish, 34th in class.

In 2005, Zogaib also competed in the Rolex Sports Car Series for Blackforest Motorsports. A crash ended his debut in the 24 Hours of Daytona early. At Watkins Glen International Zogaib scored a tenth-place finish in the Spirit of Daytona Racing Crawford DP03. For 2007, Zogaib joined Michael Shank Racing for a partial season in the Rolex Sports Car Series. The driver ran four races in one of their Lexus powered Riley Mk. XI chassis. A seventh place at Miller Motorsports Park was Zogaib's best result.

For 2008, Zogaib joined SAMAX Motorsport for a full-time season with seasoned veteran Ryan Dalziel. The team, headed by Peter Baron, was flying high with a second place at Virginia International Raceway and a win at Mazda Raceway Laguna Seca.

== Ponzi scheme ==
In 2009, a Ponzi scheme involving Zogaib and business associate Paul Bellanca was uncovered.

Zogaib and Bellanca promised prospective investors a return of up to 40% on their investment. The duo set up front companies such as Executive Investment Group LLC and Diversified Equity Investment Group LLC.

Many racing drivers were victims of the scam: teammate Ryan Dalziel and his family lost approximately $550,000. Another victim, A. J. Allmendinger, invested a sum of money but he got his money back. SAMAX Motorsport boss Peter Baron lost approximately $400,000 to Zogaib. In total, $5,400,000 was lost by 33 investors.

Zogaib was arrested in 2010, and in 2014 was sentenced to 15 years in prison. He was detained at Tomoka Correctional Institution-Work Camp.
