= Auto Club Speedway =

Motorsport track in the United States

- D-shaped oval (1997–2023)
- Location: 9300 Cherry Avenue; Fontana, California, United States
- Coordinates: 34°05′19″N 117°30′00″W
- Capacity: 122,000 (total)
- Owner: NASCAR (2019–2023); International Speedway Corporation (1999–2019)
- Operator: NASCAR (1999–2023)
- Broke ground: November 22, 1995; 30 years ago
- Opened: June 20, 1997; 29 years ago
- Closed: February 27, 2023; 3 years ago
- Construction cost: US$100 million
- Architect: Paxton Waters Architecture; Penske Motorsports, Inc.
- Former names: California Speedway (November 1995–February 2008); Auto Club Speedway (February 2008–March 2023)
- Major events: Former: NASCAR Cup Series; Pala Casino 400 (1997–2020, 2022–2023); Pepsi Max 400 (2004–2010); NASCAR Xfinity Series; Production Alliance Group 300 (1997–2020, 2022–2023); NASCAR Camping World Truck Series; San Bernardino County 200 (1997–2009); IndyCar Series; MAVTV 500 (1997–2005, 2012–2015); AMA Superbike Championship (2002–2010); Rolex Sports Car Series (2002–2005)
- Website: autoclubspeedway.com

D-shaped oval (1997–2023)
- Surface: Asphalt
- Length: 2.000 mi (3.219 km)
- Turns: 4
- Banking: Turns: 14° Frontstretch: 11° Backstretch: 3°
- Race lap record: 0:30.900 (380.431 km/h (236.389 mph)) ( (Canada) Greg Moore, Reynard 97I, 1997, CART)

Interior Road Course (2001–2023)
- Surface: Asphalt
- Length: 1.550 mi (2.494 km)
- Turns: 17
- Race lap record: 0:53.784 ( (Germany) André Lotterer, Honda NSX-GT, 2004, Super GT (GT500))

Sports Car Course (2001–2023)
- Surface: Asphalt
- Length: 2.880 mi (4.635 km)
- Turns: 18
- Race lap record: 1:29.322 ( (Belgium) Didier Theys, Dallara SP1, 2002, LMP900)

Motorcycle Course (2001–2023)
- Surface: Asphalt
- Length: 2.360 mi (3.798 km)
- Turns: 20
- Race lap record: 1:24.287 ( (France) Benoît Tréluyer, Nissan Fairlady Z (Z33), 2004, Super GT (GT500))

Auto Club Speedway (known as California Speedway before and after the 2008–2023 corporate sponsorship by the Automobile Club of Southern California) was a 2.000 mi (3.219 km), D-shaped oval superspeedway in unincorporated San Bernardino County, California, United States, near Fontana. It hosted National Association for Stock Car Auto Racing (NASCAR) racing annually from 1997 until 2023. It was also previously used for open wheel racing events. The racetrack was located 47 mi (76 km) east of Los Angeles and was near the former locations of Ontario Motor Speedway and Riverside International Raceway. The track was last owned and operated by NASCAR. The speedway was served by the nearby Interstates 10 and 15 as well as a Metrolink station located behind the backstretch.

Construction of the track, on the site of the former Kaiser Steel Mill, began in 1995 and was completed in late 1996. The speedway's main grandstand had a capacity of 68,000. Additionally it featured 28 skyboxes and had a total capacity of 122,000. In 2006, a fanzone was added behind the main grandstand. Lights were added to the speedway in 2004 with the addition of a second annual NASCAR weekend. From 2011 to 2023, the track hosted only one NASCAR weekend each year.

A 500-mile American open-wheel car race was held under Championship Auto Racing Teams sanctioning from 1997 to 2002. The current IndyCar sanctioning body ran a 400-mile race from 2002 to 2005 and a 500-mile race from 2012 to 2015, which was usually the season finale. Its last IndyCar race was the 2015 MAVTV 500.

In 2023, the track was closed for reconstruction as part of the Next Gen California project and demolition started in October 2023. However, high costs and other priorities have prevented the project from beginning. NASCAR has since held races in Southern California at Los Angeles Memorial Coliseum with the Busch Clash from 2022 to 2024, and held a street race at Naval Base Coronado in June 2026.

== Track history ==
=== Early history and construction ===
On April 20, 1994, Roger Penske and Kaiser Steel announced the construction of a racetrack on the site of the abandoned Kaiser Steel Mill in Fontana, California. A day after the announcement, Championship Auto Racing Teams (CART) announced it would hold an annual race at the speedway. Three months later NASCAR president Bill France Jr. agreed to sanction NASCAR Cup Series races at the speedway upon completion, marking the first time NASCAR made a commitment to run a race at a track that had yet to be built. Community meetings were held to discuss issues related to the construction of the track and the local effects of events held. The local community largely supported construction of the speedway citing potentially increased land values and rejuvenation of the community. In April 1995, after having toured the sister track Michigan International Speedway, the San Bernardino County Board of Supervisors unanimously approved the project. The California Environmental Protection Agency gave Penske permission to begin construction after Kaiser agreed to pay US$6 million to remove hazardous waste from the site. Construction on the site began on November 22, 1995, with the demolition of the Kaiser Steel Mill. The 100-foot (30 m) water tower, a landmark of the Kaiser property, was preserved in the center of the track to be used as a scoreboard. 3,000 cubic yards (2,300 m^{3}) of contaminated dirt was removed and transported to a toxic waste landfill. To prevent remaining impurities from rising to the surface, a cap of non-porous polyethylene was put down and covered with 2 feet (0.61 m) of clean soil. Construction of the track was completed in late 1996.

On January 10, 1997, Marlboro Team Penske's driver Paul Tracy became the first driver to test on the new speedway. NASCAR held its first open test session on at the track from May 5–7. The official opening and ribbon cutting ceremony was held on June 20, 1997, with the first race, a NASCAR West Series race, being held the next day.

=== Auto Club Speedway ===
The track was named the California Speedway from the time it was built through February 21, 2008, when the Automobile Club of Southern California purchased the naming rights in a 10-year deal; thus the track became Auto Club Speedway and has remained as of 2023, as the deal was renewed. The sponsorship was discontinued after March 2023.

=== Expansion and additions ===
With early success following the opening of the track, the speedway began to expand reserved grandstand seating along the front stretch with an additional 15,777 seats. In May 1999, an additional 28 skyboxes were added to the top of the main grandstand. In 2001 the Auto Club Dragway, a 0.250 mi (0.402 km) dragstrip, was built outside of the backstretch of the main speedway. That same year, the infield of the speedway was reconfigured to hold a multipurpose road course. On April 24, 2003, The San Bernardino County Planning Commission approved the changing of the speedway's conditional use permit to allow the installation of lights around the track. Later that year NASCAR announced a second annual NASCAR Cup Series race at the track for the 2004 season, with the second race being run "under the lights". NASCAR ran two weekends of racing annually until the 2011 season, when the track returned to a single annual race weekend.

In 2006, the speedway's midway, located behind the main grandstand, was overhauled. The new midway, called the "Discover IE FanZone", included the addition of Apex (a Wolfgang Puck restaurant), additional shade and lounge areas, a retail store and an entertainment stage.

In March 2014, the Las Vegas-based company Exotics Racing expanded to California by opening a new 1.2-mile (1.9 km) road course at the Auto Club Speedway.

=== Configurations ===
Speedway oval

Sports car course

Motorcycle course

Interior test circuit

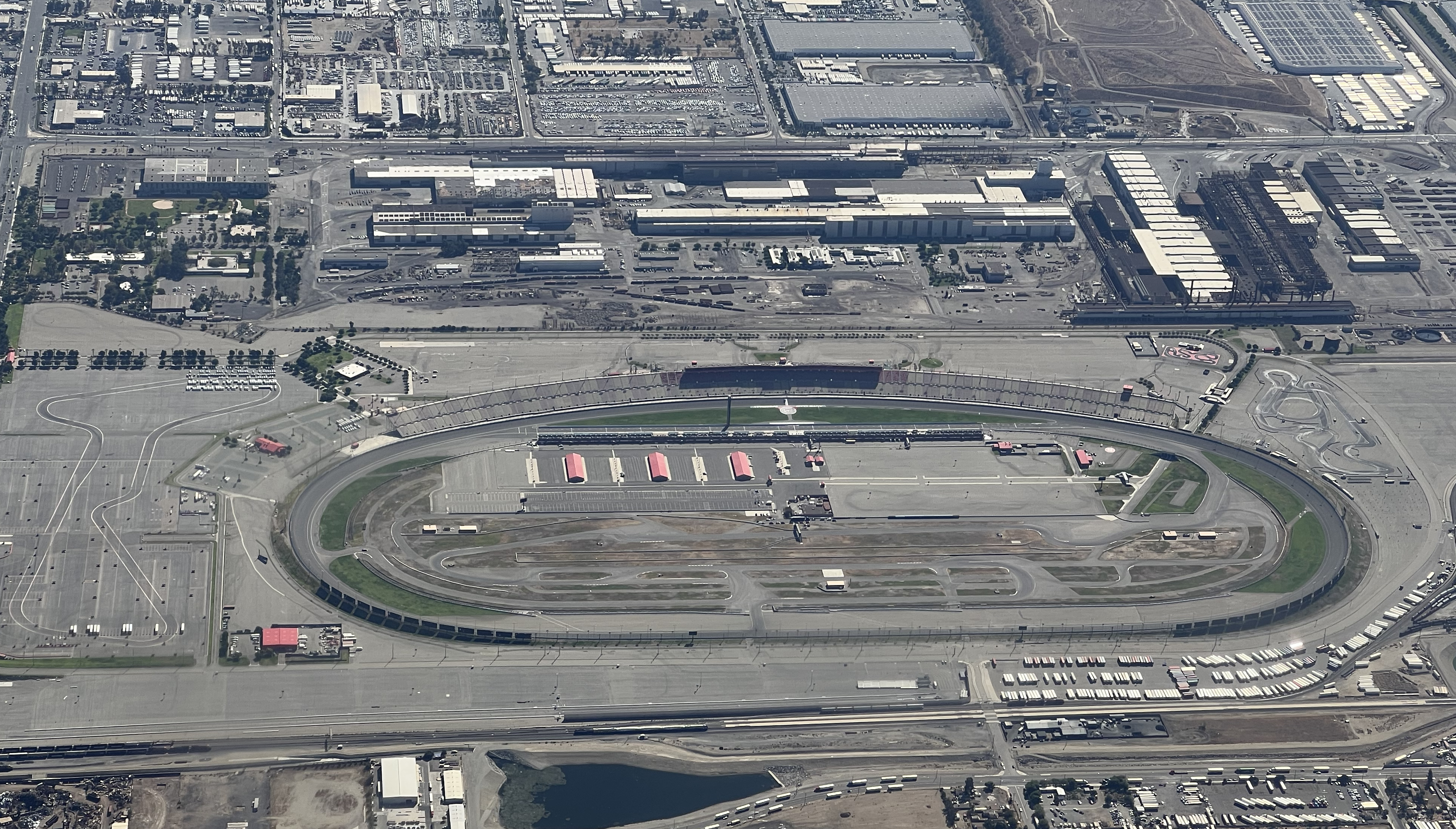
Overview of facility looking south

=== Attendance problems ===
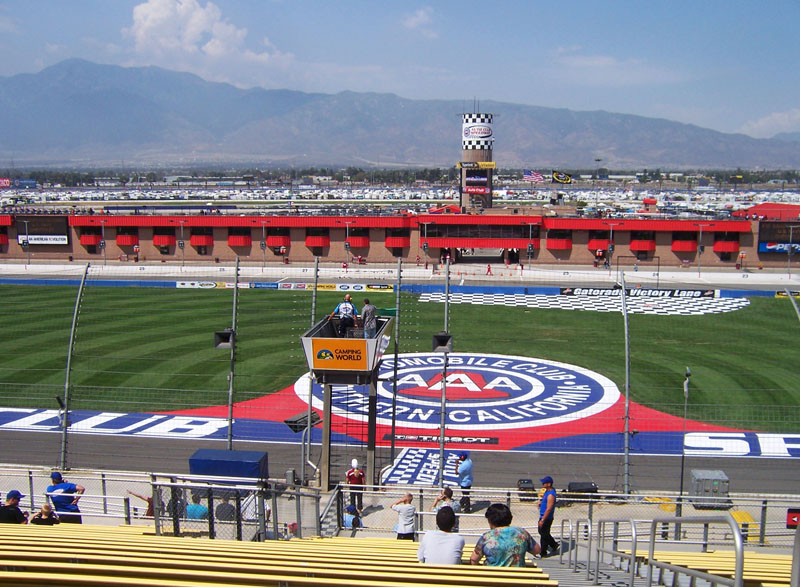
Auto Club Speedway view from grandstand center

Upon the addition of a second NASCAR weekend at the track in 2004, attendance at the races dropped off dramatically, by as much as 20,000. With such a large attendance swing, drivers and media began to doubt if the track deserved two dates, even if the track was near Los Angeles, the nation's second-largest media market. Weather also became a concern with either extremely hot days or with rain threatening the races. All of this factored into NASCAR's decision to remove a second race from the track with the realignment of the 2011 NASCAR schedule. Former track owner Roger Penske said the track may be located in a one-race market. Track president Gillian Zucker cited bad weather windows and fans having other entertainment options as reasons for the attendance decline.

Effective in the 2014 racing season, the grandstand capacity was reduced from 92,000 to 68,000. This was accomplished by removing approximately 12,000 seats near turn 1 and installing a hospitality area and a digital display showing speeds along the straightaway. In addition, seats were further reduced as a result of modifying average seat width from 18 inches to 23 inches. The capacity quoted does not include luxury boxes and infield seating, which when added reaches a capacity of approximately 100,000.

=== Name change ===
On February 21, 2008, the Automobile Club of Southern California (ACSC) became the title sponsor of the raceway, making Auto Club Speedway the track's official name. The naming rights deal was for ten years and is worth an estimated $50 to $75 million. In addition to naming rights, the ACSC was to have use of the facility for road tests for Westways magazine and other consumer tests. The money was used for capital improvements to the track.

=== In popular culture ===
The track was often used for filming television shows, commercials and films. In 2000, portions of Charlie's Angels were filmed at the speedway, and in 2005, portions of Herbie: Fully Loaded were filmed there. In 2007, The Bucket List saw Jack Nicholson and Morgan Freeman drive a vintage Shelby Mustang and Dodge Challenger around the 2.000 mi (3.219 km) speedway. The track was used as Daytona International Speedway in the 2019 film Ford v Ferrari.

A parody of the track was used in the 2006 Disney/Pixar animated film Cars in the end of the film. It is the venue for the Piston Cup tiebreaker race between the movie's main character Lightning McQueen (voiced by Owen Wilson), retiring veteran Strip "The King" Weathers (voiced by Richard Petty) and perennial runner-up Chick Hicks (voiced by Michael Keaton). The race is held at the Los Angeles International Speedway, which is a conglomeration of the Los Angeles Memorial Coliseum, the Arroyo Seco in Pasadena where the Rose Bowl is located, as well as the Auto Club Speedway.

=== Fatalities ===
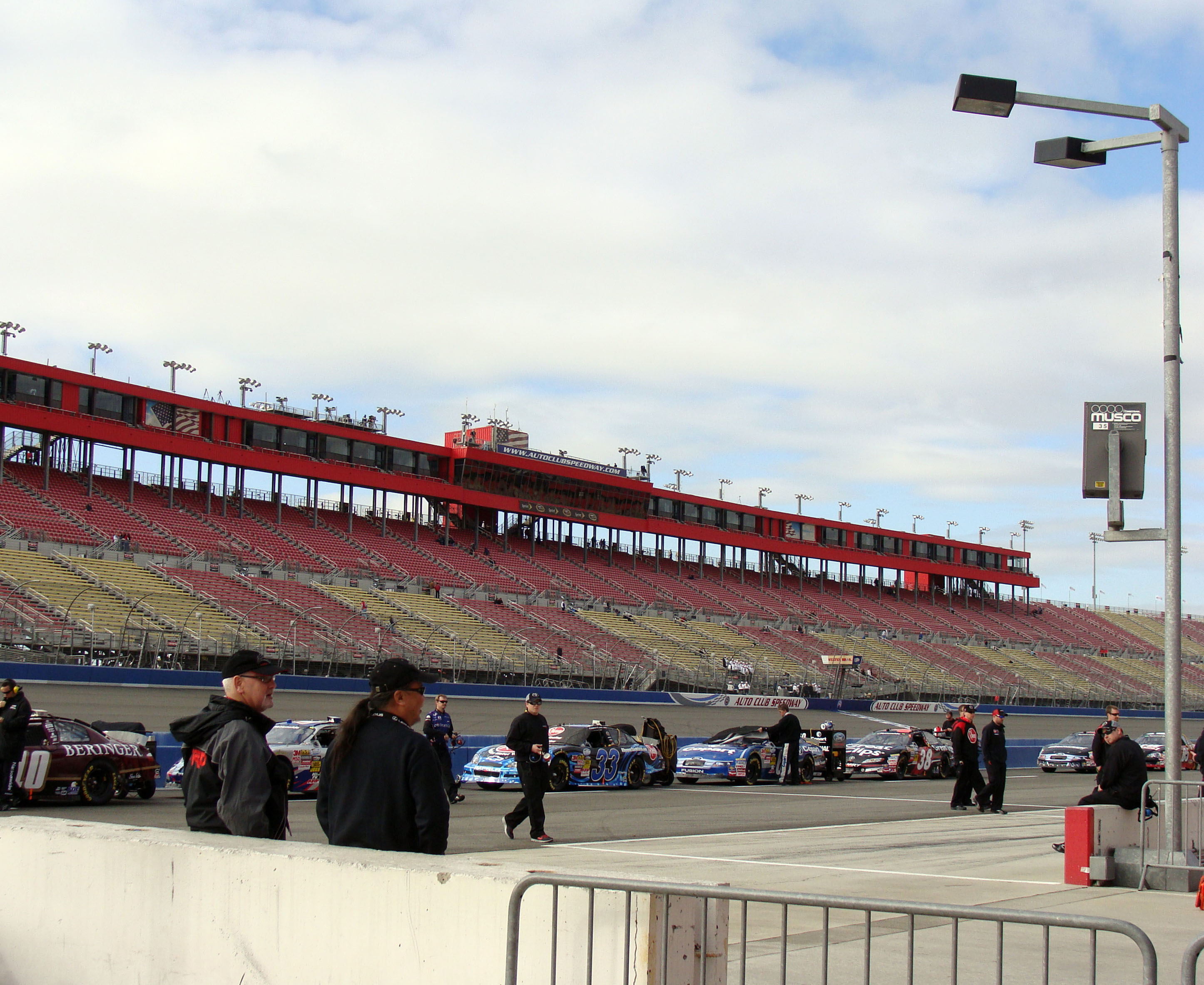
Main grandstand from pit road at Auto Club Speedway

During the 1999 Marlboro 500 CART race, Canadian driver Greg Moore died in a crash along the backstretch of the track. It was determined that after sliding along the infield grass, Moore's car hit the edge of oncoming pavement, which caused the car to flip into a concrete retaining wall. The incident prompted the track owners, ISC, to pave the backstretch of both Auto Club Speedway and its sister track Michigan International Speedway in an attempt to prevent a similar accident. Shortly after the crash, CART mandated the use of a head-and-neck restraint system on all ovals. The rule eventually became mandatory on all tracks.

On April 5, 2002, Ricky Lundgren was killed in a qualifying session for a motorcycle race.

On August 7, 2004, a police officer from San Diego, John Barr, died during an open track event after coming off his motorcycle.

On June 2, 2005, two men died while participating in an event sponsored by the San Diego Chapter of the Ferrari Club of America.

On October 15, 2010, a 24-year-old woman died while participating in a driving school at the track. The woman was driving a replica Indycar as part of the Mario Andretti Racing Experience when she lost control and hit the inside wall of the track.

=== Planned reconstruction ===
On September 8, 2020, it was revealed that documents for the reconstruction of the facility as a half-mile high banked oval had been filed with San Bernardino County. As first reported by The Insider, the new short track layout would feature long straightaways like Martinsville Speedway and high banked turns like those featured at Bristol Motor Speedway. According to the published preliminary site plan, the new layout would fit inside the footprint of the current layout's trioval, and utilize much of the existing infrastructure such as the garages (which would be outside the new track), main grandstand and pit road suites (which would overlook the relocated backstretch). The work was scheduled to start after the 2021 Auto Club 400, and to be completed in time for the 2022 season.

In December 2020, it was announced that the 2021 race weekend had been canceled due to complications surrounding the COVID-19 pandemic. On February 27, 2022, Auto Club Speedway president Dave Allen announced on SiriusXM NASCAR Radio that plans to convert the speedway had been put on hold. With the Busch Light Clash now being held at the Los Angeles Memorial Coliseum beginning in 2022, there was now no official commitment from NASCAR to follow through with plans to convert the speedway. In early 2023, following the Busch Light Clash at The Coliseum, NASCAR chief operating officer Steve O'Donnell made mention that NASCAR was, "evaluating the market as a whole and what's the best place for us to race within the totality of 2024 and beyond."

In 2023, the track was closed for reconstruction as part of the Next Gen California racing project. Demolition began in October 2023. By 2025, 433 of the 522 acres of land used for the speedway had been sold to build warehouses and an industrial park. NASCAR hoped to use the remaining area under their control to build the new track, though commissioner Steve Phelps said in April 2025 that the project was on hold due to high construction expenses and more pressing matters to address.

== Transportation ==
The Auto Club Speedway was served by a special Metrolink station, opened only on race days.

Preceding station	Metrolink	Following station
Rancho Cucamonga toward L.A. Union Station	San Bernardino Line (race days)	Fontana toward San Bernardino or Redlands

== Racing events ==
- All Japan Grand Touring Car Championship (2004, exhibition race)
- Champ Car
  - Marlboro 500 (1997–2002)
- IndyCar Series
  - MAVTV 500 (2002–2005, 2012–2015)
- IROC (1997–1998, 2002)
- NASCAR Camping World Truck Series
  - San Bernardino County 200 (1997–2009)
- NASCAR Cup Series
  - Pala Casino 400 (1997–2020, 2022–2023)
  - Pepsi Max 400 (2004–2010)
- NASCAR West Series (1997–2006)
- NASCAR Xfinity Series
  - Production Alliance Group 300 (1997–2020, 2022–2023)
- Rolex Sports Car Series
  - Grand American 400 (2002–2005)

== Other events ==
- Red, White and Cruise — A July 4 festival consisting of a car show, various family-friendly entertainment and a fireworks show.
- Epicenter 2010 at the speedway's midway
- Cardenas Festival — The annual Cardenas Festival is held in the parking lot. This is a festival where all the companies that sell food at the Cardenas supermarket chain give out free samples of new or upcoming food. There are also performances from many artists.
- Hard (music festival) was held in 2016, 2018, and 2019 in the midway and parking lot of the speedway.

== Track length of paved oval ==
The original track length was disputed by CART and NASCAR that ran at Auto Club Speedway. The NASCAR timing and scoring previously used a length of exactly 2.000 mi (3.219 km). The IRL timing and scoring also used a length of exactly 2.000 mi (3.219 km). CART measured the track as 2.029 mi (3.265 km) and used this length for timing and scoring between 1997 and 2002.

== Track records ==
The closed-course practice and qualifying lap records Arie Luyendyk had set in the run-up to the 1996 Indy 500 at 239.260 mph (385.052 km/h) and 237.498 mph (382.216 km/h) respectively were improved by Maurício Gugelmin at the 1997 Marlboro 500. He was clocked at 242.333 mph (389.997 km/h) and 240.942 mph (387.759 km/h) respectively, based on a CART-recognized track length of 2.029 mi (3.265 km).

After Juan Pablo Montoya had narrowly missed Gugelmin's practice record, Gil de Ferran set a new one-lap qualifying record of 241.428 mph (388.541 km/h) at the 2000 Marlboro 500, a CART event. As of August 2023, this is the fastest qualifying lap speed ever recorded at an official race meeting.

The 2003 Toyota Indy 400 was the fastest circuit race ever in motorsport history, with an average speed of 207.151 mph (333.377 km/h) over 400 mi (640 km), based on an IndyCar-recognized track length of 2.000 mi (3.219 km), topping the previous record average of 197.995 mph (318.642 km/h) over 507.25 miles (816.34 km) the 2002 CART race had produced.

=== Race lap records ===
The fastest official race lap records at Auto Club Speedway (formerly California Speedway) are listed as:

Category	Time	Driver	Vehicle	Event
Next-Gen Oval (under construction): 0.500 mi (0.805 km)
NASCAR Cup	N/A	N/A	N/A	N/A
D-shaped Oval (1997–2024): 2.000 mi (3.219 km)
CART	0:30.900	Greg Moore	Reynard 97I	1997 Marlboro 500
IndyCar	0:32.1208	Scott Dixon	G-Force GF09A	2003 Toyota Indy 400
Indy Lights	0:37.4702	Jeff Simmons	Dallara IPS	2005 California 100
NASCAR Cup	0:38.760	Kyle Larson	Chevrolet SS	2017 Auto Club 400
NASCAR Xfinity	0:40.247	Joey Logano	Ford Mustang	2018 Roseanne 300
Sports Car Road Course (2001–2024): 2.880 mi (4.635 km)
LMP900	1:29.322	Didier Theys	Dallara SP1	2002 Grand American 400
DP	1:31.790	Max Angelelli	Riley MkXI	2004 Grand American 400
LMP675	1:33.448	Terry Borcheller	Lola B2K/40	2002 Grand American 400
GTS	1:33.944	Boris Said	Ford Mustang	2003 Grand American 400
GT1 (GTS)	1:35.682	Chris Bingham	Saleen S7-R	2002 Grand American 400
American GT	1:37.788	Andrew Richards	Chevrolet Corvette	2002 Grand American 400
GT	1:38.366	Tommy Milner	BMW M3 (E46)	2004 Grand American 400
SGS	1:42.065	Randy Pobst	Porsche 911 (996) GT3 Cup	2004 Grand American 400
Motorcycle Road Course (2001–2024): 2.360 mi (3.798 km)
Super GT (GT500)	1:24.287	Benoît Tréluyer	Nissan Fairlady Z (Z33)	2004 Fontana All-Stars JGTC round
Interior Test Circuit (2001–2024): 1.550 mi (2.494 km)
Super GT (GT500)	0:53.784	André Lotterer	Honda NSX-GT	2004 Fontana All Stars JGTC round
Super GT (GT300)	0:57.740	Shinichi Takagi	ASL Garaiya	2004 Fontana All Stars JGTC round

Record	Year	Date	Driver	Time	Speed/avg. speed
NASCAR Cup Series
Qualifying (one lap)	2018	March 16	Kevin Harvick	0:38.147	188.744 mph (303.754 km/h)
Race (500 miles)	1997	June 27	Jeff Gordon	3:13:32	155.012 mph (249.468 km/h)
Race (400 miles)*	2012	March 25	Tony Stewart	2:39:06	160.166 mph (257.762 km/h): Race was shortened from 200 to 129 laps due to rain
Race (400 miles, not rain-shortened)	2020	March 1	Alex Bowman	2:37:07	152.753 mph (245.832 km/h)
NASCAR Xfinity Series
Qualifying (one lap)	2005	September 3	Tony Stewart	0:38.722	185.941 mph (299.243 km/h)
Race (300 miles)	2001	April 28	Hank Parker Jr.	1:55:25	155.957 mph (250.988 km/h)
NASCAR Camping World Truck Series
Qualifying (one lap)	2006	February 24	David Reutimann	0:40.228	178.980 mph (288.040 km/h)
Race (200 miles)	2003	September 20	Ted Musgrave	1:22:14	145.926 mph (234.845 km/h)
NASCAR West Series
Qualifying (one lap)	2001	April 28	Mark Reed	0:39.649	181.593 mph (292.246 km/h)
Race (200 miles)	2001	April 28	Brendan Gaughan	1:28:47	152.316 mph (245.129 km/h)
CART
Qualifying (one lap - 2.029 miles)	2000	October 28	Gil de Ferran	0:30.255	241.428 mph (388.541 km/h)
Race (507.25 miles)	2002	November 3	Jimmy Vasser	2:33:42	197.995 mph (318.642 km/h)
INDYCAR
Qualifying (one lap)	2003	September 20	Hélio Castroneves	0:31.752	226.757 mph (364.930 km/h)
Race (400 miles)	2003	September 21	Sam Hornish Jr.	1:55:51	207.151 mph (333.377 km/h)
Race (500 miles)	2014	August 30	Tony Kanaan	2:32:58	196.111 mph (315.610 km/h)

== NASCAR Cup Series stats ==
(As of 3/1/20)

Most wins	6	Jimmie Johnson
Most top 5s	13	Jimmie Johnson
Most top 10s	18	Jimmie Johnson
Starts	27	Kurt Busch, Kevin Harvick (tie)
Poles	4	Kurt Busch
Most laps completed	5,906	Jimmie Johnson
Most laps led	990	Jimmie Johnson
Avg. start*	9.8	Austin Dillon
Avg. finish*	7.6	Jimmie Johnson

* from minimum 5 starts

=== NASCAR Cup Series race winners ===
Season	Date	Official race name	Winning driver	Car No.	Make	Distance	Avg speed	Margin of victory
1997	June 22	California 500	Jeff Gordon	24	Chevrolet Monte Carlo	500 mi (800 km)	155.012 mph (249.468 km/h)	1.074 sec
1998	May 3	California 500 presented by NAPA	Mark Martin	6	Ford Taurus	500 mi (800 km)	140.22 mph (225.662 km/h)	1.287 sec
1999	May 2	California 500 presented by NAPA	Jeff Gordon	24	Chevrolet Monte Carlo	500 mi (800 km)	150.276 mph (241.846 km/h)	4.492 sec
2000	April 30	NAPA Auto Parts 500	Jeremy Mayfield	12	Ford Taurus	500 mi (800 km)	149.378 mph (240.401 km/h)	0.300 sec
2001	April 29	NAPA Auto Parts 500	Rusty Wallace	2	Ford Taurus	500 mi (800 km)	143.118 mph (230.326 km/h)	0.27 sec
2002	April 28	NAPA Auto Parts 500	Jimmie Johnson	48	Chevrolet Monte Carlo	500 mi (800 km)	150.088 mph (241.543 km/h)	0.620 sec
2003	April 27	Auto Club 500	Kurt Busch	97	Ford Taurus	500 mi (800 km)	140.111 mph (225.487 km/h)	2.294 sec
2004	May 2	Auto Club 500	Jeff Gordon	24	Chevrolet Monte Carlo	500 mi (800 km)	137.268 mph (220.911 km/h)	12.871 sec
2004	September 5	Pop Secret 500	Elliott Sadler	38	Ford Taurus	500 mi (800 km)	128.324 mph (206.517 km/h)	0.263 sec
2005	February 27	Auto Club 500	Greg Biffle	16	Ford Taurus	500 mi (800 km)	139.697 mph (224.821 km/h)	0.231 sec
2005	September 4	Sony HD 500	Kyle Busch	5	Chevrolet Monte Carlo	508 mi (818 km) *	136.356 mph (219.444 km/h)	0.554 sec
2006	February 26	Auto Club 500	Matt Kenseth	17	Ford Fusion	502 mi (808 km) *	147.852 mph (237.945 km/h)	0.338 sec
2006	September 3	Sony HD 500	Kasey Kahne	9	Dodge Charger	500 mi (800 km)	144.462 mph (232.489 km/h)	3.427 sec
2007	February 25	Auto Club 500	Matt Kenseth	17	Ford Fusion	500 mi (800 km)	138.451 mph (222.815 km/h)	0.679 sec
2007	September 2	Sharp AQUOS 500	Jimmie Johnson	48	Chevrolet Monte Carlo SS	500 mi (800 km)	131.502 mph (211.632 km/h)	1.868 sec
2008	February 25	Auto Club 500	Carl Edwards	99	Ford Fusion	500 mi (800 km)	132.704 mph (213.566 km/h)	UC
2008	August 31	Pepsi 500	Jimmie Johnson	48	Chevrolet Impala	500 mi (800 km)	138.857 mph (223.469 km/h)	2.076 sec
2009	February 22	Auto Club 500	Matt Kenseth	17	Ford Fusion	500 mi (800 km)	135.839 mph (218.612 km/h)	1.463 sec
2009	October 11	Pepsi 500	Jimmie Johnson	48	Chevrolet Impala	500 mi (800 km)	143.908 mph (231.597 km/h)	1.603 sec
2010	February 21	Auto Club 500	Jimmie Johnson	48	Chevrolet Impala	500 mi (800 km)	141.911 mph (228.384 km/h)	1.523
2010	October 10	Pepsi Max 400	Tony Stewart	14	Chevrolet Impala	400 mi (640 km)	131.953 mph (212.358 km/h)	0.466 sec
2011	March 27	Auto Club 400	Kevin Harvick	29	Chevrolet Impala	400 mi (640 km)	150.849 mph (242.768 km/h)	0.144 sec
2012	March 25	Auto Club 400	Tony Stewart	14	Chevrolet Impala	258 mi (415 km) **	160.166 mph (257.762 km/h)	UC
2013	March 24	Auto Club 400	Kyle Busch	18	Toyota Camry	400 mi (640 km)	135.351 mph (217.826 km/h)	UC
2014	March 23	Auto Club 400	Kyle Busch	18	Toyota Camry	412 mi (663 km) *	132.987 mph (214.022 km/h)	0.214 sec
2015	March 22	Auto Club 400	Brad Keselowski	2	Ford Fusion	418 mi (673 km) *	140.662 mph (226.374 km/h)	0.710 sec
2016	March 20	Auto Club 400	Jimmie Johnson	48	Chevrolet SS	410 mi (660 km) *	137.213 mph (220.823 km/h)	0.772 sec
2017	March 26	Auto Club 400	Kyle Larson	42	Chevrolet SS	404 mi (650 km) *	136.359 mph (219.449 km/h)	0.779 sec
2018	March 18	Auto Club 400	Martin Truex Jr.	78	Toyota Camry	400 mi (640 km)	147.526 mph (237.420 km/h)	11.685 sec
2019	March 17	Auto Club 400	Kyle Busch	18	Toyota Camry	400 mi (640 km)	143.113 mph (230.318 km/h)	2.354 sec
2020	March 1	Auto Club 400	Alex Bowman	88	Chevrolet Camaro ZL1 1LE	400 mi (640 km)	152.753 mph (245.832 km/h)	8.904 sec
2021	Cancelled due to the state of California COVID-19 restrictions							
2022	February 27	WISE POWER 400	Kyle Larson	5	Chevrolet Camaro	400 mi (640 km)	114.222 mph (183.822 km/h)	0.195 sec
2023	February 26	Pala Casino 400	Kyle Busch	8	Chevrolet Camaro	400 mi (640 km)	127.603 mph (205.357 km/h)	2.998 sec

*– Race extended due to green-white-checker finish **– Race shortened due to rain

== Open wheel race winners ==
Season	Date	Race name	Winning driver	Winning team
CART
1997	September 28	Marlboro 500	(United Kingdom) Mark Blundell	PacWest
1998	November 1	Marlboro 500 Presented by Toyota	(United States) Jimmy Vasser	Chip Ganassi Racing
1999	October 31	Marlboro 500 Presented by Toyota	(Mexico) Adrián Fernández	Patrick Racing
2000	October 30	Marlboro 500	(Brazil) Christian Fittipaldi	Newman-Haas Racing
2001	November 14	The 500 by Toyota	(Brazil) Cristiano da Matta	Newman-Haas Racing
2002	November 3	The 500	(United States) Jimmy Vasser	Team Rahal
2003	November 9	King Taco 500	Canceled due to wildfires in the San Bernardino mountains	
IndyCar Series
2002	March 24	Yamaha Indy 400	(United States) Sam Hornish Jr.	Panther Racing
2003	September 21	Toyota Indy 400	(United States) Sam Hornish Jr.	Panther Racing
2004	October 3	Toyota Indy 400	(Mexico) Adrian Fernández	Aguri-Fernández Racing
2005	October 16	Toyota Indy 400	(United Kingdom) Dario Franchitti	Andretti Green Racing
2006 to 2011, Not held
2012	September 15	MAVTV 500	(United States) Ed Carpenter	Ed Carpenter Racing
2013	October 19	MAVTV 500	(Australia) Will Power	Team Penske
2014	August 30	MAVTV 500	(Brazil) Tony Kanaan	Chip Ganassi Racing
2015	June 27	MAVTV 500	(United States) Graham Rahal	Rahal Letterman Lanigan Racing
