= Archie Urciuoli =

American racing driver

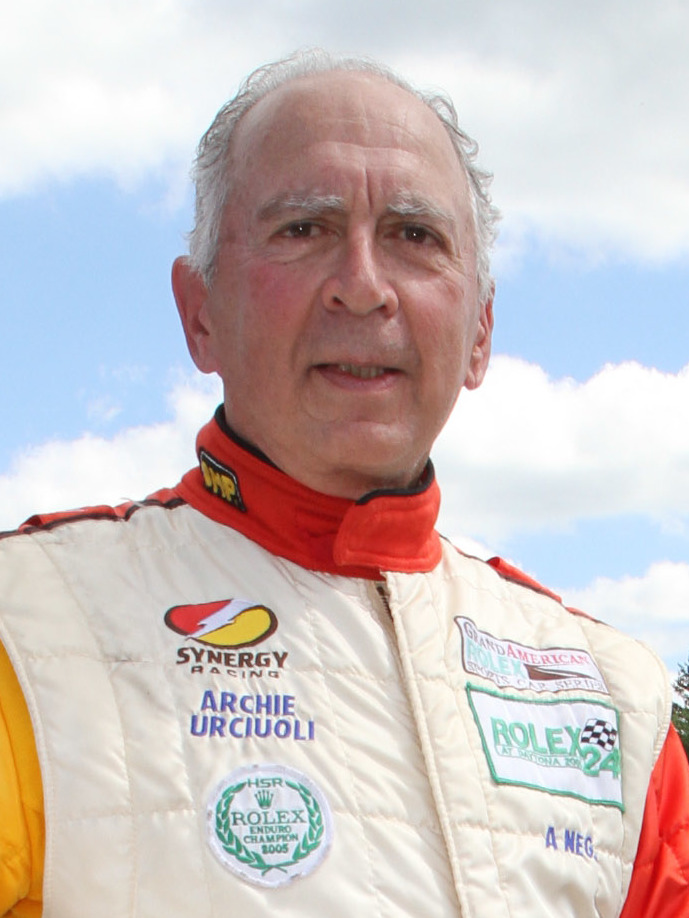
Urciuoli in 2010

J. Arthur "Archie" Urciuoli is a business executive, attorney, author, and a veteran racing driver, whose racing career spans five decades.

== Biography ==
Urciuoli, a native of Syracuse, NY, graduated from St. Lawrence University and Georgetown Law, and completed the Harvard Business School AMP program. He is a former U.S. Marine Corps Captain. During his 35 years on Wall Street, he was a leading financier of Japanese companies in the international capital markets. He was Chairman of Merrill Lynch's banks in London, Geneva and Panama. He was later appointed Director of Marketing for all products and services sold via Merrill branch offices. He retired in 1999 from the position of Chairman of Merrill Lynch International.

In his "retirement", Urciuoli is now Chairman of ArcherGroup Investments, Ltd, a private investment and consulting firm. He is a former director of Biodel Inc., and of the Kroll Bond Rating Agency, and also has served on the boards of several corporations and charities, and is the author of numerous business publications.

Under the pseudonym “Grumpy”, Urciuoli is the author of the popular “Muttmulligans” children’s books.

Urciuoli was a member of the Governing Council of the International Motor Racing Research Center in Watkins Glen, New York. He was also a board member of the exclusive Road Racing Drivers Club (RRDC).

Urciuoli's racing career began in the late 1950s, when he first competed in Jaguar XK-140 MC & E-types in New England SCCA regional events and continued until the late '60s.

Urciuoli returned to sports car racing in 1988, competing in the Barber Formula Ford, and VSCCA, SVRA and HSR vintage classes. From 1990-1996 he campaigned a Jaguar D-Type, Ford GT Mk IV and Ralt Formula 2 at tracks across the United States, with a number of podium finishes, winning the Skip Barber Racing Cup in 1994. He continued to compete in SVRA and HSR vintage GTP and FIA classes with Chevron B-36, Porsche 956, Ford GT40 and Lola T70 Spyder from 1999 to 2015, with many podium finishes.

=== Notable racing accomplishments ===
- In 1994, Urciuoli ran a Ford GT Mk IV at the Bonneville speed week, attaining a top speed of 226 and one-mile average of 187 mph.
- Won the Monterey Historics Award in 1997.
- Co-drove a Porsche GT3 in the Rolex 24 At Daytona, in 1998 and 1999.
- Winner of GTP 2 in 2003 HSR GTP / Group C Series Championship.
- Co-drove a Daytona Prototype in the 2005 Rolex Daytona 24.
- Overall winner of 2005 HSR GTP / Group C Series Championship.
- Winner of FIA class Rolex award, 2009 Monterey Historic Races.
- Was named the 2017 recipient of the prestigious Road Racing Drivers Club Bob Akin Memorial Motorsports Award.
