= 2004 Rolex Sports Car Series =

5th season of the racing series organized by Grand-Am

Seasons
- ← 2003 2005 →

The 2004 Rolex Sports Car Series season was the fifth season of the Rolex Sports Car Series run by the Grand American Road Racing Association. The season involved three classes, Daytona Prototypes (DP), Grand Touring (GT), and Super Grand Sport (SGS). Twelve races were run from January 31, 2004, to October 31, 2004.

== Schedule ==
Rnd	Race	Length/Duration	Circuit	Date
1	Rolex 24 at Daytona	24 Hours	Daytona International Speedway	January 31; February 1
2	Grand Prix of Miami	250 Miles	Homestead-Miami Speedway	February 28
3	Phoenix 250	250 Miles	Phoenix International Raceway	April 10
4	6 Hours of Mont-Tremblant	6 Hours	Circuit Mont-Tremblant	May 23
5	Sahlen's Six Hours of the Glen	6 Hours	Watkins Glen International	June 20
6	Paul Revere 250	250 Miles	Daytona International Speedway	July 1
7	EMCO Gears Mid-Ohio Road Racing Classic	250 Miles	Mid-Ohio Sports Car Course	August 7
8	Sahlen's 200 at the Glen	200 Miles	Watkins Glen International	August 13
9	Homestead-Miami 250	250 Miles	Homestead-Miami Speedway	September 19
10	VIR 400	400 km	Virginia International Raceway	October 3
11	Porsche 250	250 Miles	Barber Motorsports Park	October 10
12	Lexus Grand American 400	400 km	California Speedway	October 31

== Results ==
Overall winners in bold.

Rnd	Circuit	DP Winning Teams	GT Winning Teams	SGS Winning Teams
Rnd	Circuit	DP Winning Drivers	GT Winning Drivers	SGS Winning Drivers
1	Daytona	**(United States) #54 Bell Motorsports**	(United States) #44 Orbit Racing	(Canada) #91 Doncaster Racing
1	Daytona	**(United States) Andy Pilgrim** **(United States) Terry Borcheller** **(Brazil) Christian Fittipaldi** **(United States) Forest Barber**	(United States) Mike Fitzgerald (United Kingdom) Robin Liddell (United Kingdom) Johnny Mowlem (United States) Joe Policastro (United States) Joe Policastro, Jr.	(Canada) Jean-François Dumoulin (Germany) Marc Lieb (Canada) Robert Julien (Canada) Greg Pootmans
2	Homestead	**(United States) #2 Howard-Boss Motorsports**	(United States) #21 Prototype Technology Group	(United States) #16 AASCO Motorsports
2	Homestead	(Venezuela) **Milka Duno** (United Kingdom) **Andy Wallace**	(United States) Boris Said (United States) Bill Auberlen	(United States) David Murry (United States) Craig Stanton
3	Phoenix	**(United States) #10 SunTrust Racing**	(United States) #21 Prototype Technology Group	(United States) #36 TPC Racing
3	Phoenix	**(South Africa) Wayne Taylor** **(Italy) Max Angelelli**	(United States) Boris Said (United States) Bill Auberlen	(United States) Michael Levitas (United States) Randy Pobst
4	Mont-Tremblant	**(United States) #01 CompUSA Chip Ganassi Racing with Felix Sabates**	(United States) #21 Prototype Technology Group	(United States) #36 TPC Racing
4	Mont-Tremblant	**(United States) Scott Pruett** **(Italy) Max Papis**	(United States) Boris Said (United States) Bill Auberlen	(United States) Michael Levitas (United States) Randy Pobst
5	Watkins Glen	**(United States) #01 CompUSA Chip Ganassi Racing with Felix Sabates**	(United States) #21 Prototype Technology Group	(United States) #38 TPC Racing
5	Watkins Glen	**(United States) Scott Pruett** **(Italy) Max Papis**	(United States) Boris Said (United States) Bill Auberlen	(United States) Andy Lally (United States) Marc Bunting
6	Daytona	**(United States) #10 SunTrust Racing**	(United States) #21 Prototype Technology Group	(United States) #41 Orison-Planet Earth Motorsports
6	Daytona	**(South Africa) Wayne Taylor** **(Italy) Max Angelelli**	(United States) Justin Marks (United States) Bill Auberlen	(United States) Wayne Nonnamaker
7	Mid-Ohio	**(United States) #01 CompUSA Chip Ganassi Racing with Felix Sabates**	(United States) #21 Prototype Technology Group	(United States) #41 Orison-Planet Earth Motorsports
7	Mid-Ohio	**(United States) Scott Pruett** **(Italy) Max Papis**	(United States) Justin Marks (United States) Bill Auberlen	(United States) Wayne Nonnamaker
8	Watkins Glen	**(United States) #27 Doran Lista Racing**	(United States) #22 Prototype Technology Group	(United States) #37 TPC Racing
8	Watkins Glen	**(Belgium) Didier Theys** **(Denmark) Jan Magnussen**	(United States) Boris Said (United States) Joey Hand	(United States) John Littlechild (United States) Spencer Pumpelly
9	Homestead	**(United States) #2 Howard-Boss Motorsports**	(United States) #67 The Racers Group	(United States) #36 TPC Racing
9	Homestead	**(Venezuela) Milka Duno** **(United Kingdom) Andy Wallace**	(United States) Kevin Buckler (United States) Tom Nastasi	(United States) Michael Levitas (United States) Randy Pobst
10	Virginia	**(United States) #10 SunTrust Racing**	(United States) #21 Prototype Technology Group	(United States) #36 TPC Racing
10	Virginia	**(South Africa) Wayne Taylor** **(Italy) Max Angelelli**	(United States) Justin Marks (United States) Bill Auberlen	(United States) Michael Levitas (United States) Randy Pobst
11	Barber	**(United States) #4 Howard-Boss Motorsports**	(United States) #21 Prototype Technology Group	(United States) #38 TPC Racing
11	Barber	**(United States) Elliott Forbes-Robinson** **(United States) Butch Leitzinger**	(United States) Justin Marks (United States) Bill Auberlen	(United States) Andy Lally (United States) Marc Bunting
12	California	**(United States) #01 CompUSA Chip Ganassi Racing with Felix Sabates**	(United States) #16 Prototype Technology Group	(United States) #04 Grease Monkey Racing
12	California	**(United States) Scott Pruett** **(Italy) Max Papis**	(United States) Tom Milner (United States) Kelly Collins	(United States) Harrison Brix (United States) Gene Sigal

== Championship standings ==
=== Daytona Prototypes ===
==== Drivers (Top 20) ====
Pos	Driver	Points
1	(United States) Scott Pruett	362
1	(Italy) Max Papis	362
2	(South Africa) Wayne Taylor	352
3	(United Kingdom) Andy Wallace	331
4	(Italy) Max Angelelli	329
5	(Venezuela) Milka Duno	314
6	(Mexico) Jimmy Morales	302
7	(United States) Elliott Forbes-Robinson	295
7	(United States) Butch Leitzinger	295
8	(Belgium) Didier Theys	294
9	(United States) Terry Borcheller	277
10	(Mexico) Luis Diaz	277
11	(United States) Cort Wagner	273
12	(United States) Burt Frisselle	261
12	(Brazil) Oswaldo Negri	261
13	(United States) J. C. France	250
13	(United States) Hurley Haywood	250
14	(United States) Darren Law	249
14	(United States) David Donohue	249

=== Grand Touring ===
==== Drivers (Top 10) ====
Pos	Driver	Points
1	(United States) Bill Auberlen	373
2	(United States) Boris Said	373
3	(United States) Justin Marks	340
4	(United States) R. J. Valentine	328
4	(United States) Ian James	328
4	(United States) Chris Gleason	328
5	(United States) Kevin Buckler	319
6	(United States) Joey Hand	316
7	(United States) Stephen Earle	297
7	(United States) Emil Assentato	297

=== Super Grand Sport ===
==== Drivers (Top 5) ====
Pos	Driver	Points
1	(United States) Andy Lally	377
1	(United States) Marc Bunting	377
2	(United States) Michael Levitas	359
3	(United States) John Littlechild	329
4	(United States) Joe Nonnamaker	307
5	(United States) Randy Pobst	306
