= Vintage Sports Car Club of America =

The Vintage Sports Car Club of America (VSCCA) is an American auto racing club and sanctioning body focused on competition and sports cars made before 1959. Founded in 1958, it currently runs a year-round schedule of track, hillclimb, rally, and social events primarily on the East Coast.

In 2011, the club was due to present the Springfield Vintage Grand Prix, together with the city of Springfield but it was cancelled due to legal and logistical issues.
