= Super Grand Sport =

Motorsport Class

Super Grand Sport is the name of a former classification designated by Grand-Am for the 2004 Rolex Sports Car Series sports car racing championship. The class competed for a single season in 2004, and was an evolution of the former Grand Sport class. These cars were production-based, and moved up from the Grand-Am Cup series. Examples of cars that were eligible to compete included the Ferrari 360, Chevrolet Corvette, and Porsche 911 GT3.
