= Sport Touring (class) =

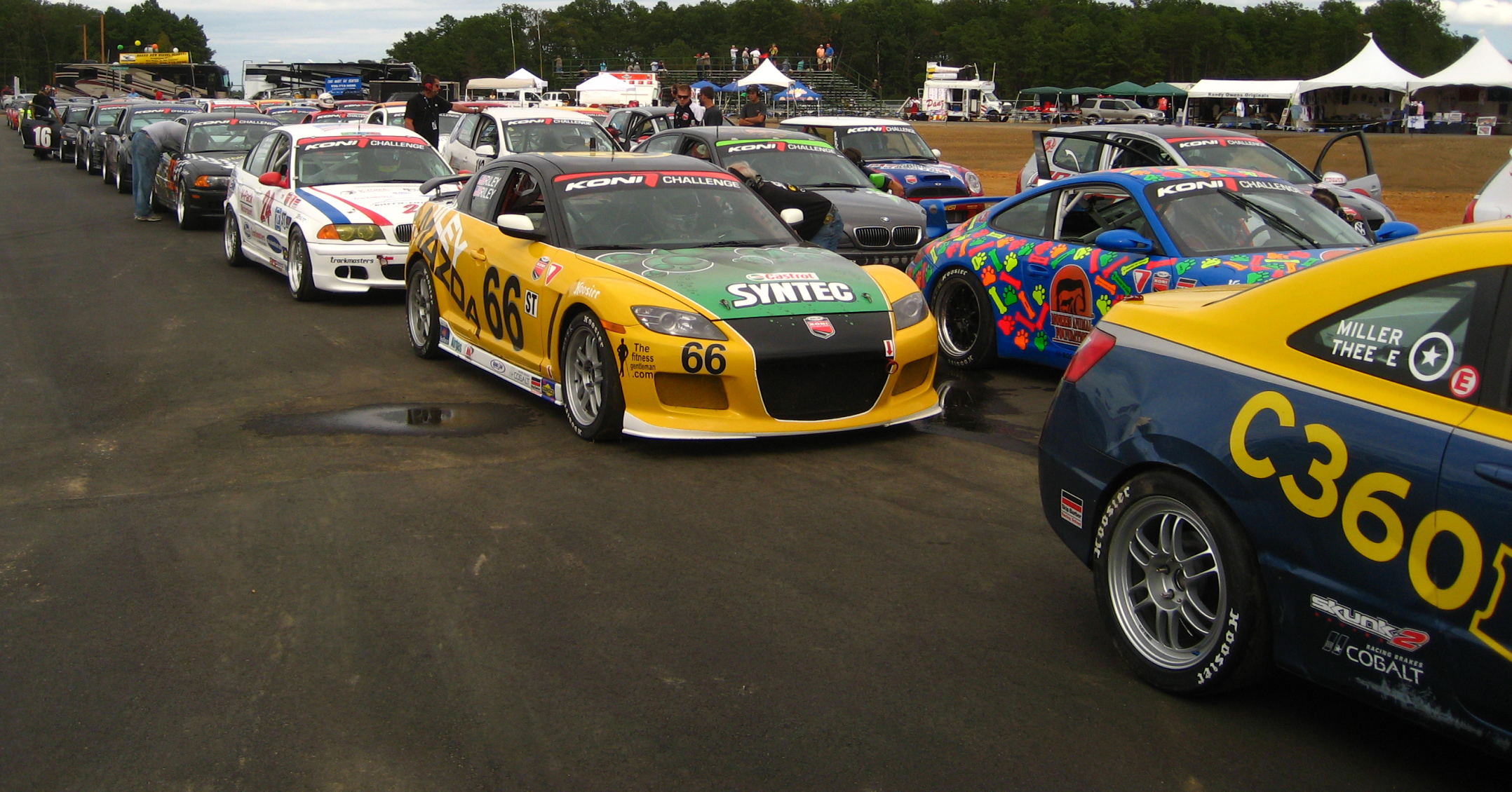
Competitors in the KONI Challenge on a pre-grid at New Jersey Motorsports Park in 2008

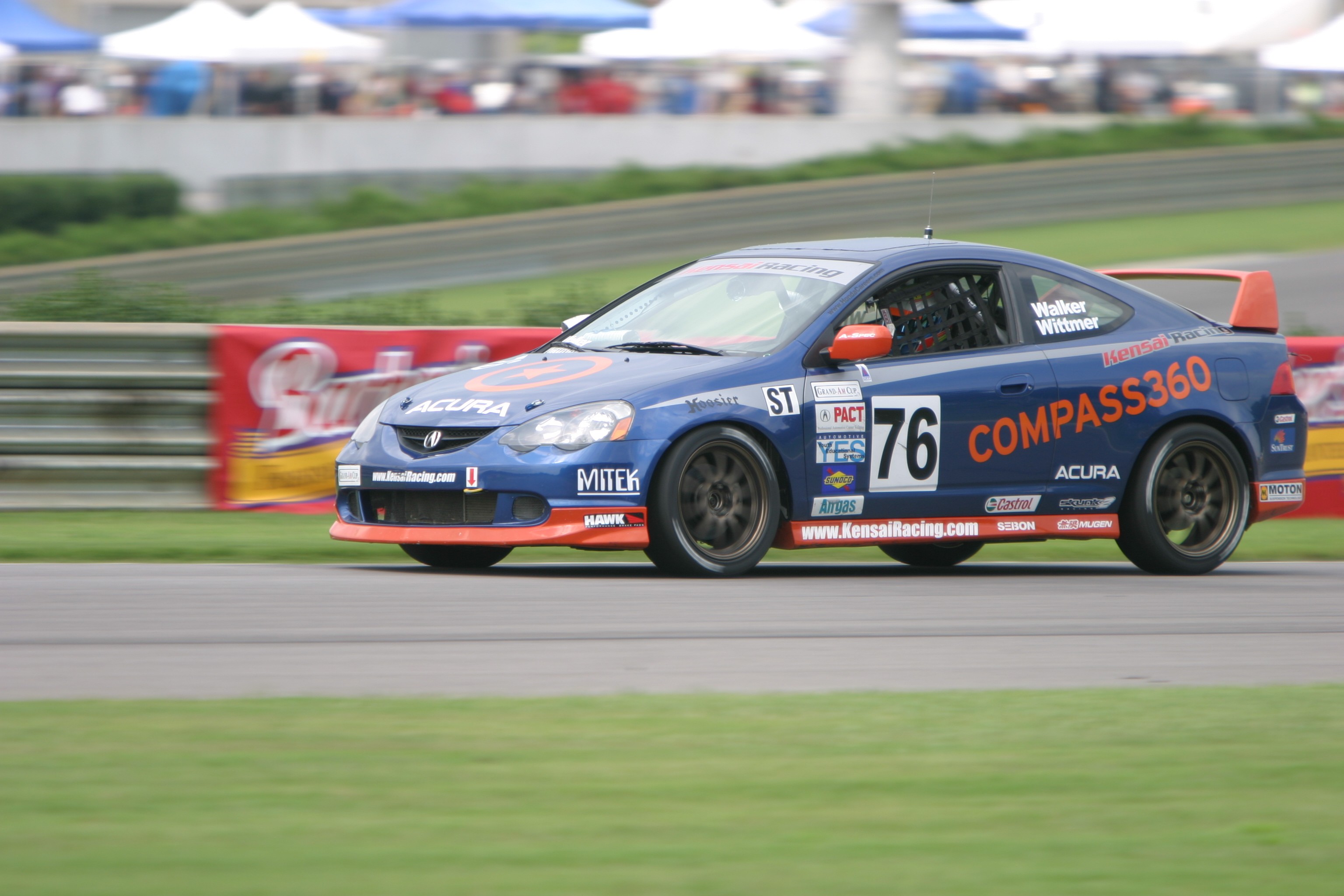
Acura RSX

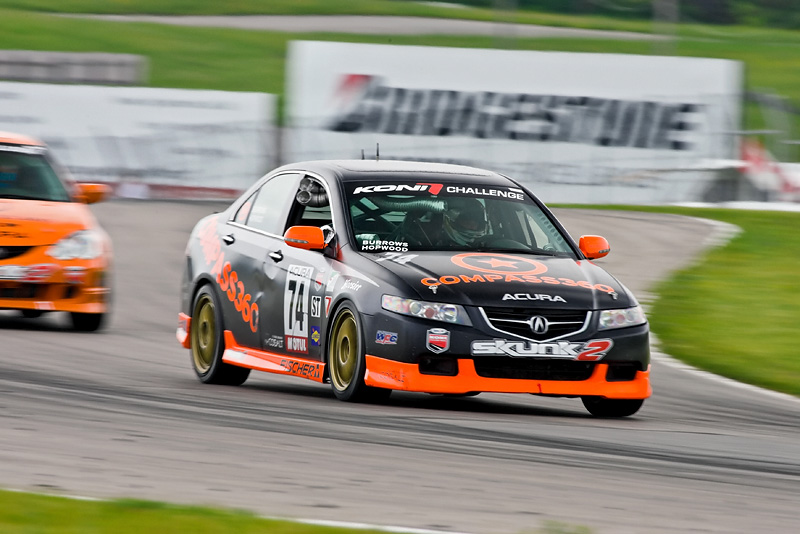
Acura TSX

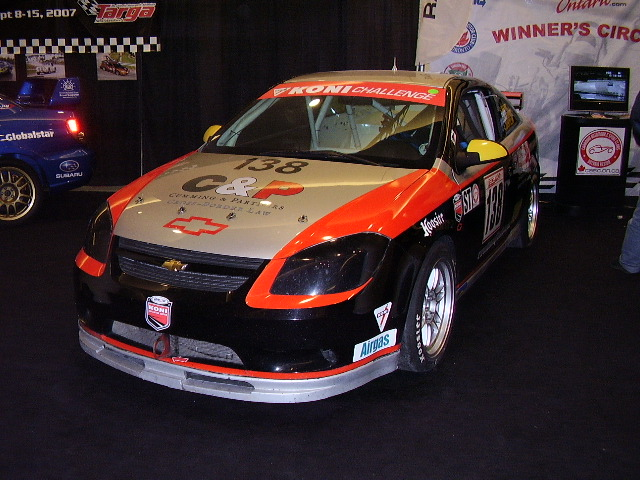
Chevy Cobalt

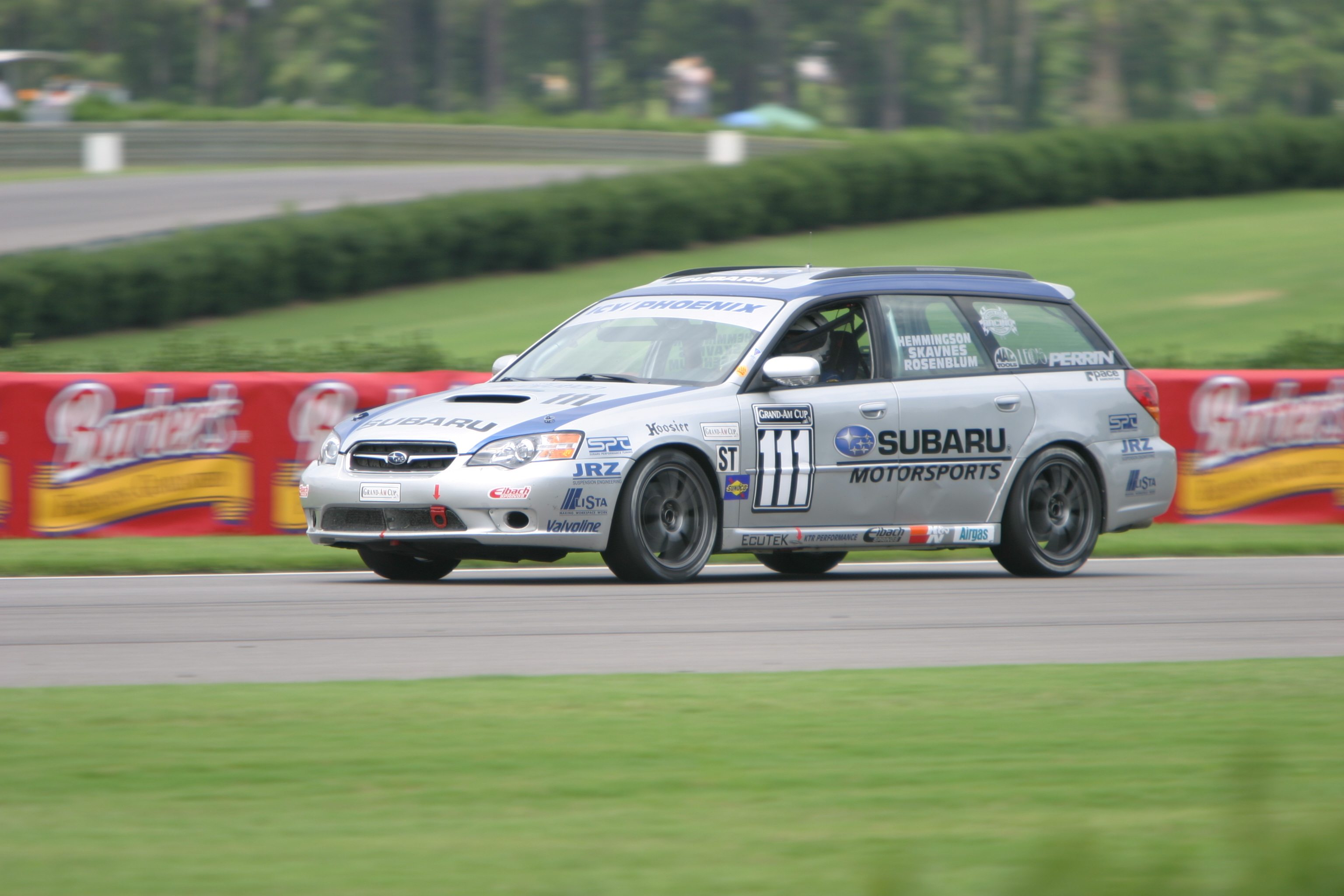
Subaru Legacy

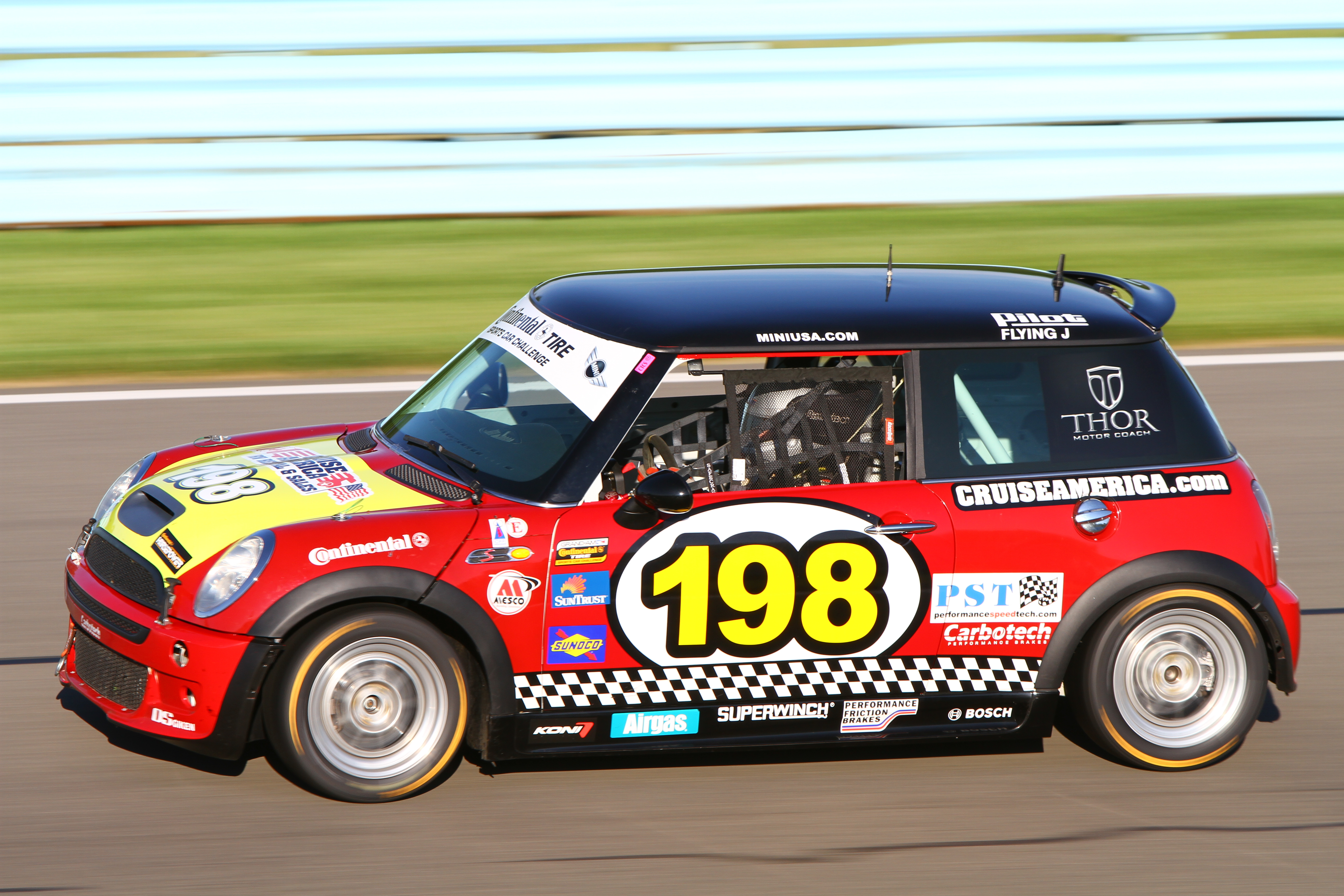
Mini Cooper S

Sport Touring (ST), also known as Street Tuner, is a former set of regulations for production-based race cars, originally by the SCCA, and later by Grand-Am and IMSA, for the Canadian Motorola Cup (later known as the Grand-Am Cup, KONI Sports Car Challenge/Challenge Series, and finally the Michelin Pilot Challenge), between 1997 and 2018. Class rules dictated these cars have smaller displacement engines, with 4, 5 or 6 cylinders, typically producing around 170 hp (130 kW) to 240 hp (180 kW), typically consisting of smaller sedans, hatchbacks, coupes, and convertibles. Examples of cars competing in this class included the Acura RSX, Acura TSX, Chevrolet Cobalt, Lexus IS300, Mazda RX-8, BMW Z3, BMW 330i, Acura Integra Type R Mini Cooper S, and the Subaru Legacy.
