= Grand Sport (class) =

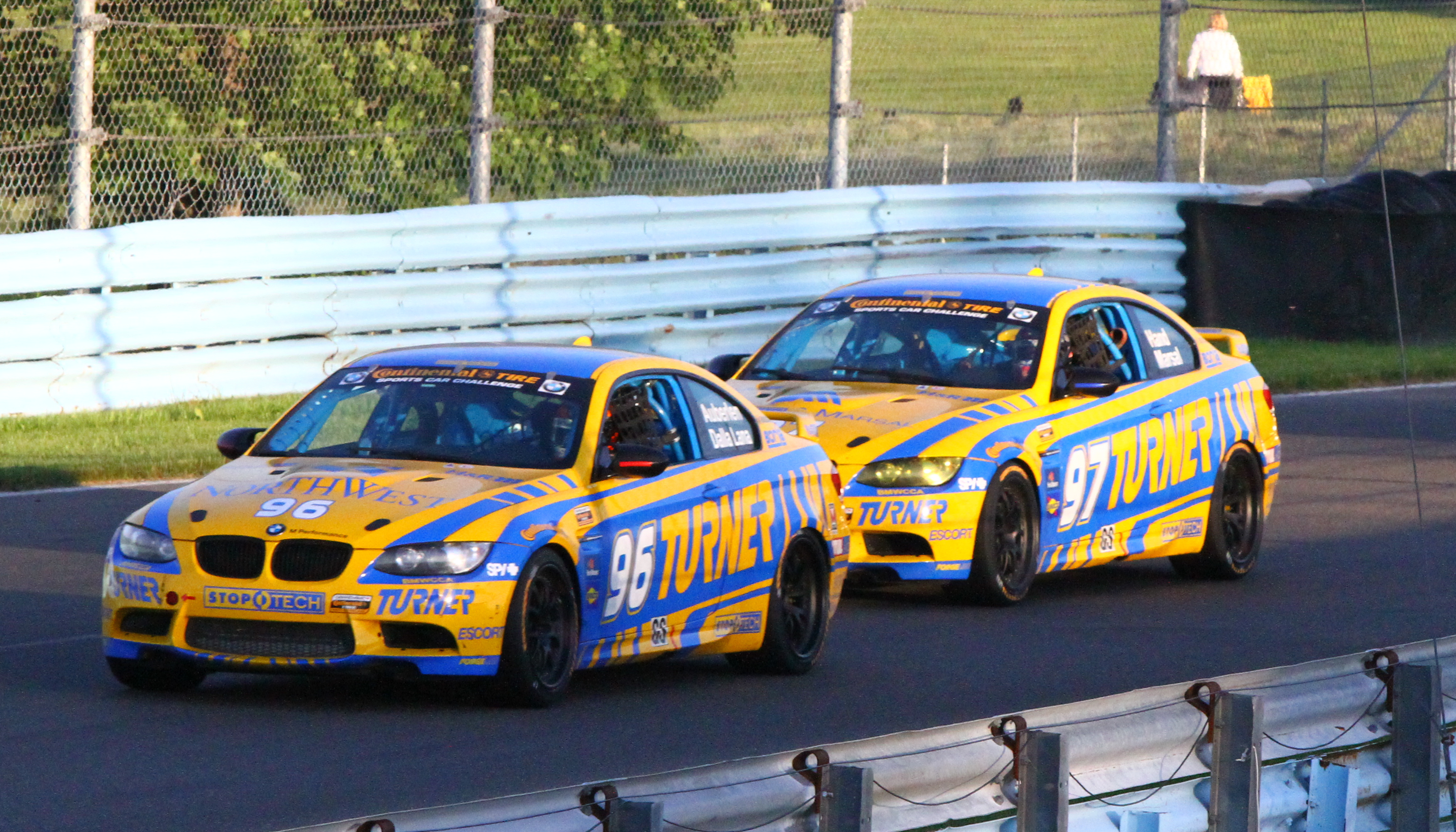
BMW M3 Coupe

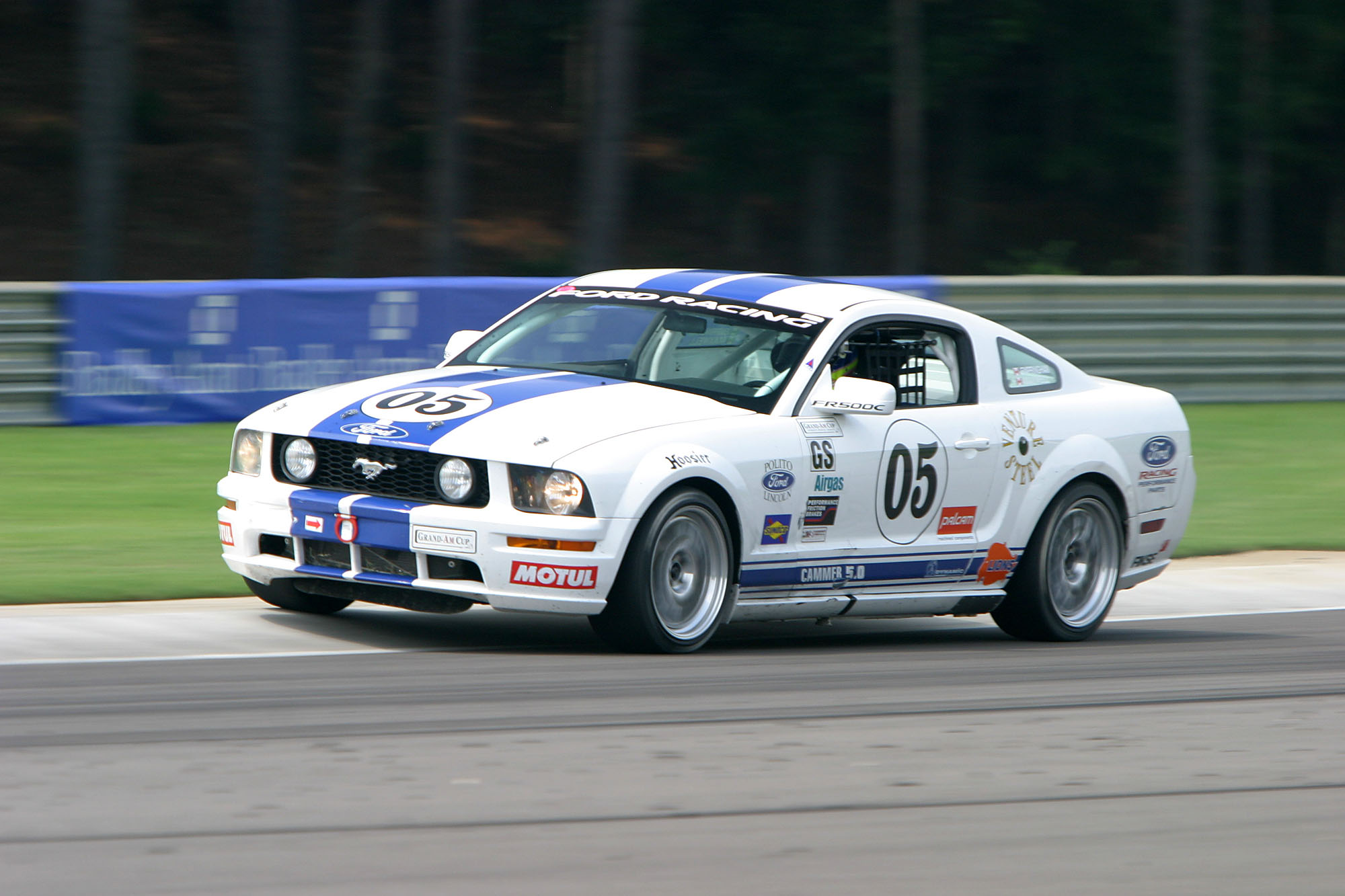
Ford Mustang GT

Grand Sport (GS) is a former set of regulations for grand touring race cars, originally by the SCCA for the Canadian Motorola Cup in 1997, then formerly by Grand-Am, and then finally by IMSA, in the Michelin Pilot Challenge (formerly known as the Grand-Am Cup), between 1997 and 2017. It was the quicker of the two classes at the time; the other being the Sport Touring class. Class rules dictated that the cars weigh between 2,900 lb (1,300 kg) and 3,300 lb (1,500 kg), depending on engine displacement, and featured large displacement motors, or smaller motors with forced induction systems. Power output for the class was between about 350 hp (260 kW) and 405 hp (302 kW). The class was later superseded and replaced by more modern FIA GT4 machinery in 2018. Examples of cars that formerly competed in this class include the BMW M3, Pontiac Firebird, Ford Mustang/Mustang SVT Cobra, Nissan 350Z, and the Porsche 996.
