= Christian Fittipaldi =

Brazilian racing driver (born 1971)

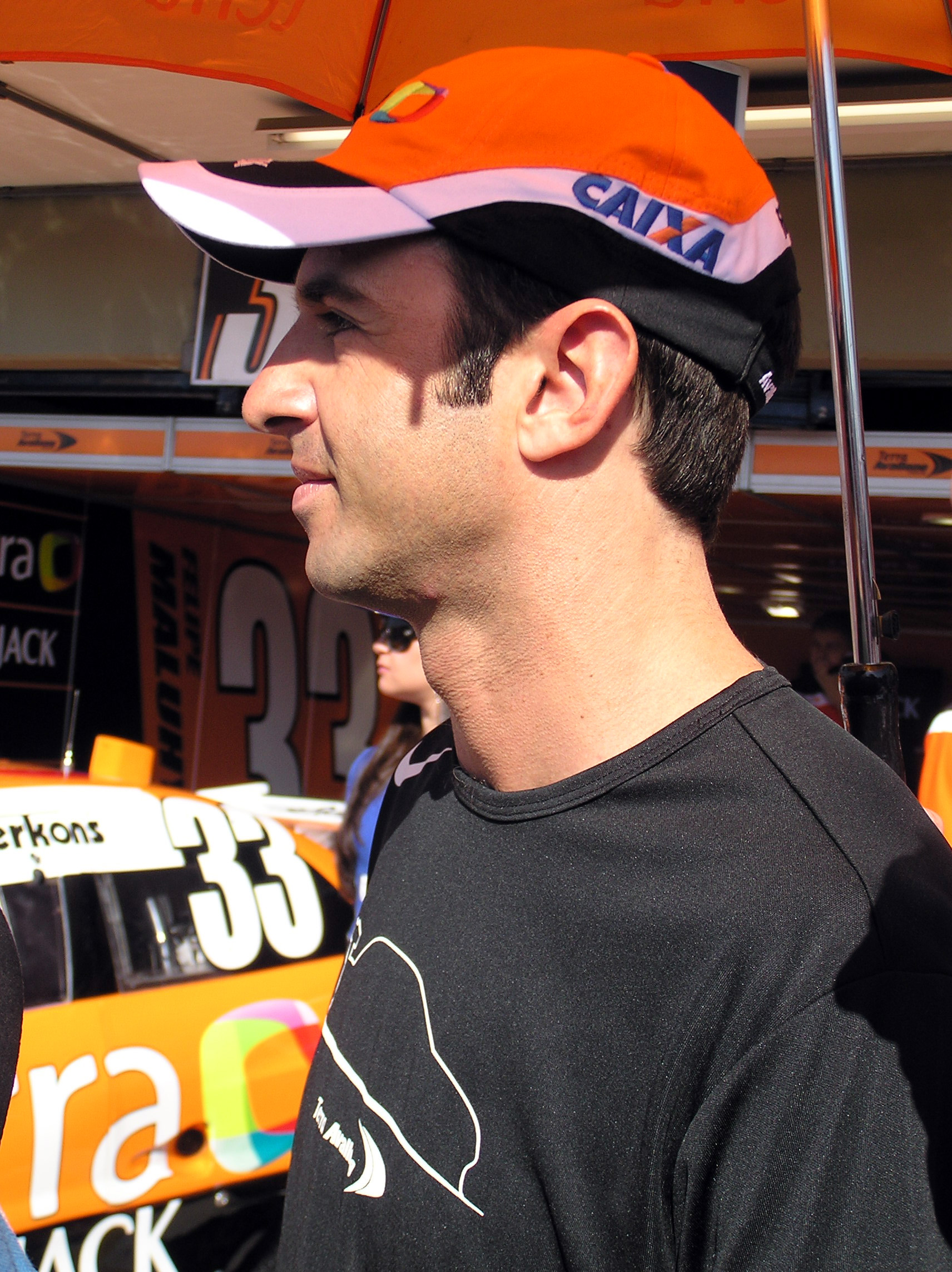
- Fittipaldi in 2006 as a Stock Car Brasil driver
- Nationality: (Brazil) Brazilian
- Born: 18 January 1971 (age 55) São Paulo, Brazil
- Relatives: Wilson Fittipaldi (father); Emerson Fittipaldi (uncle); Pietro Fittipaldi (first cousin once-removed); Enzo Fittipaldi (first cousin once-removed); Emerson Fittipaldi Jr. (cousin); Max Papis (cousin-in-law)

WeatherTech SportsCar Championship career
- Debut season: 2014
- Current team: Action Express Racing
- Categorisation: FIA Platinum (until 2018); FIA Gold (2019–)
- Car number: 5
- Engine: Chevrolet 5.5L V8
- Co-driver: (Portugal) João Barbosa (France) Sébastien Bourdais
- Starts: 47
- Championships: 2
- Wins: 7
- Poles: 6
- Best finish: 1st in 2014, 2015
- Finished last season: 3rd (2017)

Previous series
- 2008 2003–2013 2005–06 2002–2003 2003 2002 1995–2002 1992–1994 1991: American Le Mans; Rolex Sports Car Series; A1 Grand Prix; NASCAR Winston Cup Series; ARCA Re/Max Series; NASCAR Busch Series; CART; Formula One; Formula 3000

Championship titles
- 1991: Formula 3000

Awards
- 1995: Indianapolis 500 Rookie of the Year

Formula One World Championship career
- Active years: 1992–1994
- Team(s): Minardi, Footwork
- Entries: 43 (40 starts)
- Championships: 0
- Wins: 0
- Podiums: 0
- Career points: 12
- Pole positions: 0
- Fastest laps: 0
- First entry: 1992 South African Grand Prix
- Last entry: 1994 Australian Grand Prix

Champ Car career
- 135 races run over 8 years
- Years active: 1995–2002
- Teams: Walker Racing; Newman/Haas Racing
- Best finish: 5th (1996, 2002)
- First race: 1995 Grand Prix of Miami (Bicentennial Park)
- Last race: 2002 Gran Premio Telmex-Gigante (Mexico City)
- First win: 1999 Champ Car Grand Prix of Road America (Road America)
- Last win: 2000 Marlboro 500 (Fontana)
| Wins | Podiums | Poles |
|---|---|---|
| 2 | 20 | 1 |

NASCAR Cup Series career
- 16 races run over 2 years
- Best finish: 44th (2003)
- First race: 2002 Checker Auto Parts 500 Presented by Pennzoil (Phoenix)
- Last race: 2003 UAW-GM Quality 500 (Charlotte)
| Wins | Top tens | Poles |
|---|---|---|
| 0 | 0 | 0 |

NASCAR O'Reilly Auto Parts Series career
- 3 races run over 2 years
- Best finish: 102nd (2002)
- First race: 2001 GNC Live Well 300 (Homestead)
- Last race: 2002 Mr. Goodcents 300 (Kansas)
| Wins | Top tens | Poles |
|---|---|---|
| 0 | 0 | 0 |

Christian Fittipaldi (born 18 January 1971) is a Brazilian former racing driver who has competed in various forms of motorsport including Formula One, Champ Car, and NASCAR. He was a highly rated young racing driver in the early 1990s, and participated in 43 Formula One Grands Prix for Minardi and Footwork between 1992 and 1994.

Fittipaldi was fifth in the CART series in both 1996 and 2002, earning two wins and a second place in the 1995 Indianapolis 500. He has also had success racing sports prototypes, winning the 24 Hours of Daytona of 2004, 2014 and 2018, the 12 Hours of Sebring of 2015, the 6 Hours of Watkins Glen of 2013, 2016 and 2017, and has captured two IMSA SportsCar Championships with Action Express Racing during the 2014 and 2015 seasons.

A member of the Fittipaldi racing family, he is the son of former Formula One driver and team owner Wilson Fittipaldi, the nephew of two-time Formula One World Champion and Indianapolis 500 winner Emerson Fittipaldi, and the cousin of racing driver Emerson Fittipaldi Jr.. He is also the first cousin once-removed of Pietro and Enzo Fittipaldi, who are the grandsons of Emerson Fittipaldi.

== Early years ==
Fittipaldi was born in São Paulo. He is named after Christian Heins, a Brazilian racing driver who was killed in a wreck during the 1963 24 Hours of Le Mans. Fittipaldi was second in the Brazilian Formula Ford in 1988. After finishing third in the South American Formula 3 in 1989, in 1990, he won the title in the Formula 3 Sudamericana and the fourth place in the British Formula 3.

In 1991, Fittipaldi was installed in Europe to compete in the Formula 3000, where he captured two wins and seven podiums in ten races to obtain the championship against Alessandro Zanardi. Later, he was third in the Macau Grand Prix of Formula 3.

== Formula One ==
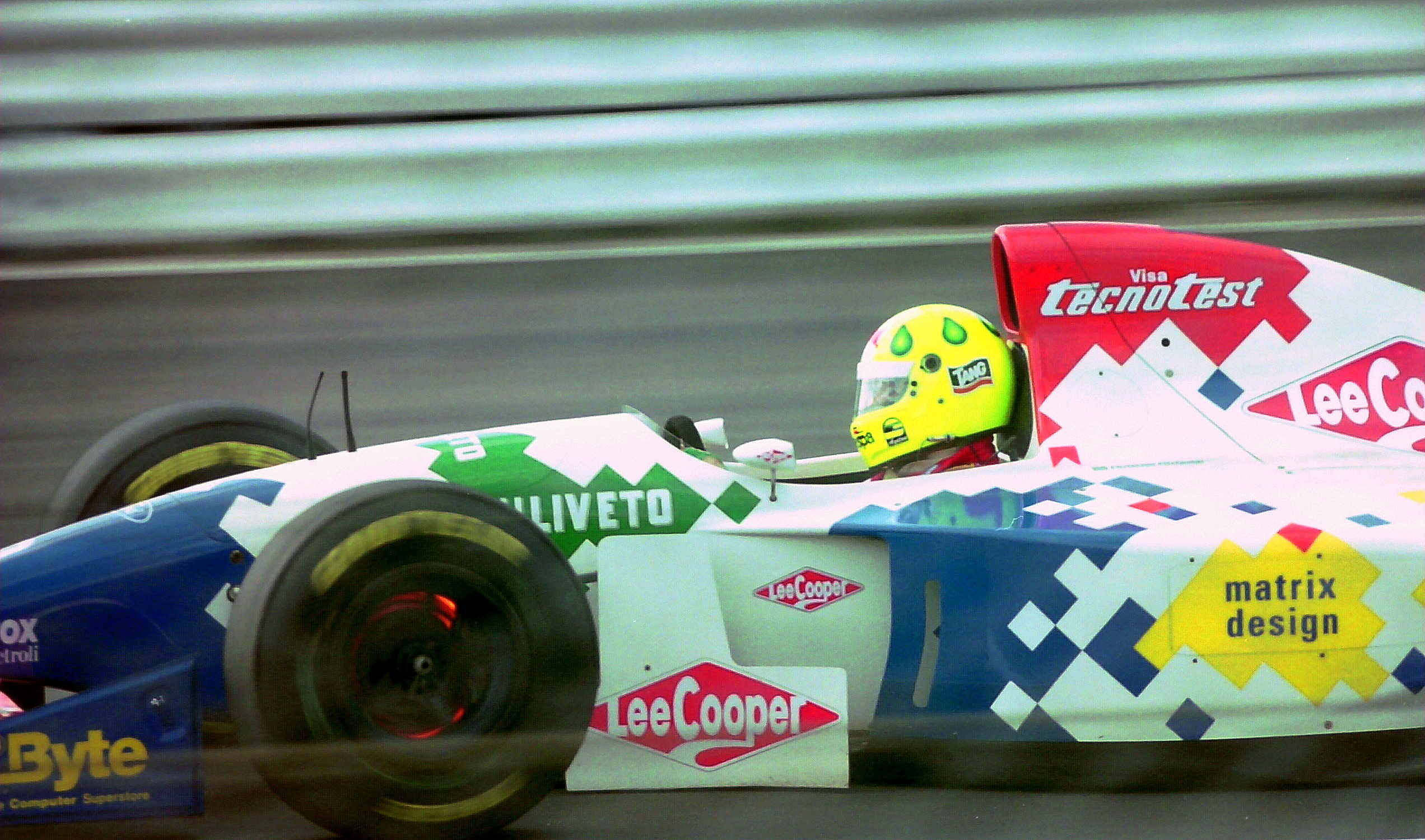
Fittipaldi driving for Footwork at the 1994 British Grand Prix.

Fittipaldi's jump into Formula 1 happened in 1992 with Minardi, scoring a single point. For 1993, he would score 5 points in the Drivers' Championship, but the team dropped him with two rounds to go. The following season, he competed in the Footwork team and earned two fourth places, finishing the season with 6 points. At the end of the 1994 season, Fittipaldi would retire from Formula One and move to CART.

In 2016, in an academic paper that reported a mathematical modeling study that assessed the relative influence of driver and machine, Fittipaldi was ranked the 11th best Formula One driver of all time.

== CART ==
Competing mainly in CART, Fittipaldi was a slow starter, noted for his consistency rather than his outright pace, although by the time he won his first CART event at Road America in 1999, he was a championship contender due to his consistent finishing, among which was a second place in the 1995 Indianapolis 500, which earned him Rookie of the Year honors in the race. However, just as Fittipaldi's American career looked to be taking off, he broke his leg for the first time (out of the two total he suffered while racing in CART) at the Surfer's Paradise race in 1997. Although he was able to return both times and win two races, he never won a CART championship. He made a cameo appearance in Driven, which utilizes CART.

== NASCAR ==
With his Champ Car career on hold, Fittipaldi shifted his focus to NASCAR. He made three appearances in the Busch Series during the 2001 and 2002 seasons. Although he was not impressive in those races, he was signed to Petty Enterprises near late-2002 and made his Winston Cup debut at Phoenix after he caught the eye of Richard Petty. In 2003, he made his first (and only) Daytona 500 start in a one-race deal with Andy Petree and then made a handful of appearances for Petty in ARCA. In the summer of that year, Fittipaldi became the driver of the illustrious No. 43 car after John Andretti (cousin of Fittipaldi's former CART teammate Michael Andretti) was let go. He struggled and was reassigned shortly after the start of autumn, but remained with the team, driving the No. 44 car.

== Sports cars racing ==
In parallel to his activity in Formula 1, Fittipaldi was the winner of the 1993 24 Hours of Spa and 1994 Brazilian 1000 Miles.

Fittipaldi debuted at the 24 Hours of Daytona in 2003 with the Bell team, resulting sixth with a Doran-Chevrolet of the class Daytona Prototype. It was one of the pilots that won the 2004 24 Hours of Daytona, in this case with a Doran-Pontiac. Then participated in four other rounds from the Grand-Am Rolex Sports Car Series with Bell, earning seventh in Virginia.

Fittipaldi contested the first two races of the 2006 Grand-Am series with Bell, earning a sixth place at Homestead. Then ran six rounds with Riley-Pontiac of The Racer's Group, earning a victory in Phoenix, a second place in the 6 Hours of Watkins Glen and third in the 200 Miles at Watkins Glen.

In 2006, Fittipaldi disputed fully the Grand-Am series with the team of Eddie Cheever. Obtained a second place and a sixth, to be located in the 23rd position in the drivers' championship of DP class. That same year, he participated in the 24 Hours of Le Mans with a Saleen S7, where he finished in sixth place in the GT1 class, a total of eleven participants.

Continuing with Cheever, Fittipaldi achieved a fourth, seventh and eighth in 2007 and resulting twentieth in the overall table of the DP class of the Grand Am Series. Also, it came tenth in the GT1 class of the 24 Hours of Le Mans, at the wheel of an Aston Martin DB9 of team Modena alongside Antonio Garcia and amateur.

Fittipaldi disputed the first four rounds of the 2008 American Le Mans Series with Andretti Green. Piloting an Acura LMP2 with Bryan Herta, earned a fourth place, a fifth, a sixth and a seventh. Then again disputed the 24 Hours of Le Mans with Aston Martin DB9 of Modena, reaching delayed in the thirtieth overall position. He then ran in the final five rounds of the Grand-Am series with a Coyote-Pontiac of Cheever's team, earning a second place and a sixth.

Fittipaldi was invited to run the 2011 24 Hours of Daytona with a Porsche-Riley of Action Express Racing, resulting third overall with Max Papis and João Barbosa among others. In 2012, he participated again in this race with Action Express, in this case at the wheel of a Chevrolet Corvette DP, with which finished fifth.

Fittipaldi became in regular driver of Action Express for the 2013 Rolex Sports Car Series season. He achieved two wins at Mid-Ohio and the 6 Hours of Watkins Glen, two second places, a fourth and a fifth, mostly with Barbosa. Thus, he was seventh in the drivers' championship in the Daytona Prototypes class.

Fittipaldi won the Rolex 24 at Daytona in 2014 in the Action Express Corvette DP with João Barbosa and Sébastien Bourdais.

== Motorsports career results ==
=== Complete British Formula Three Championship results ===
(key) (Races in bold indicate pole position)

| Year | Entrant | Chassis | Engine | Class | 1 | 2 | 3 | 4 | 5 | 6 | 7 | 8 | 9 | 10 | 11 | 12 | 13 | 14 | 15 | 16 | 17 | DC | Points |
|---|---|---|---|---|---|---|---|---|---|---|---|---|---|---|---|---|---|---|---|---|---|---|---|
| 1990 | West Surrey Racing | Ralt RT34 | Mugen-Honda | A | DON; 4 | SIL; 14 | THR; 5 | BRH; 6 | SIL; 7 | BRH; 6 | THR; 4 | SIL; 8 | **DON**; 1 | SIL; 6 | SNE; 3 | OUL; Ret | SIL; DSQ | BRH; 5 | DON; Ret | THR; 4 | SIL; 2 | 4th | 36 |

=== Complete International Formula 3000 results ===
(key) (Races in bold indicate pole position) (Races in italics indicate fastest lap)

| Year | Entrant | Chassis | Engine | 1 | 2 | 3 | 4 | 5 | 6 | 7 | 8 | 9 | 10 | DC | Points |
|---|---|---|---|---|---|---|---|---|---|---|---|---|---|---|---|
| 1991 | Pacific Racing | Reynard 91D | Mugen Honda | **VAL**; 2 | PAU; 2 | **JER**; 1 | MUG; 3 | PER; Ret | HOC; 4 | BRH; 3 | SPA; Ret | **BUG**; 2 | **NOG**; 1 | **1st** | **47** |

=== Complete Formula One results ===
(key) (Races in bold indicate pole position)

| Year | Entrant | Chassis | Engine | 1 | 2 | 3 | 4 | 5 | 6 | 7 | 8 | 9 | 10 | 11 | 12 | 13 | 14 | 15 | 16 | WDC | Points |
|---|---|---|---|---|---|---|---|---|---|---|---|---|---|---|---|---|---|---|---|---|---|
| 1992 | Minardi Team | Minardi M191 | Lamborghini 3.5 L V12 | RSA; Ret | MEX; Ret | BRA; Ret | ESP; 11 | | | | | | | | | | | | | 18th | 1 |
| 1992 | Minardi Team | Minardi M192 | Lamborghini 3.5 L V12 | | | | | SMR; Ret | MON; 8 | CAN; 13 | FRA; DNQ | GBR | GER | HUN | BEL; DNQ | ITA; DNQ | POR; 12 | JPN; 6 | AUS; 9 | 18th | 1 |
| 1993 | Minardi Team | Minardi M193 | Ford HB 3.5 L V8 | RSA; 4 | BRA; Ret | EUR; 7 | SMR; Ret | ESP; 8 | MON; 5 | CAN; 9 | FRA; 8 | GBR; 12 | GER; 11 | HUN; Ret | BEL; Ret | ITA; 8 | POR; 9 | JPN | AUS | 13th | 5 |
| 1994 | Footwork Ford | Footwork FA15 | Ford HB 3.5 L V8 | BRA; Ret | PAC; 4 | SMR; 13 | MON; Ret | ESP; Ret | CAN; DSQ | FRA; 8 | GBR; 9 | GER; 4 | HUN; 14 | BEL; Ret | ITA; Ret | POR; 8 | EUR; 17 | JPN; 8 | AUS; 8 | 15th | 6 |

=== Complete CART results ===
(key)

| Year | Team | No. | Chassis | Engine | 1 | 2 | 3 | 4 | 5 | 6 | 7 | 8 | 9 | 10 | 11 | 12 | 13 | 14 | 15 | 16 | 17 | 18 | 19 | 20 | 21 | Rank | Points | Ref |
|---|---|---|---|---|---|---|---|---|---|---|---|---|---|---|---|---|---|---|---|---|---|---|---|---|---|---|---|---|
| 1995 | Walker Racing | 15 | Reynard 95i | Ford XB V8t | MIA; 5 | SRF; 25 | PHX; 10 | LBH; 14 | NZR; 20 | INDY; 2 | MIL; 7 | DET; 17 | POR; 12 | ROA; 8 | TOR; 9 | CLE; 24 | MIS; 9 | MDO; 25 | NHM; 8 | VAN; 24 | LS; 24 | | | | | 15th | 54 | |
| 1996 | Newman/Haas Racing | 11 | Lola T96/00 | Ford XD V8t | MIA; 6 | RIO; 5 | SRF; 5 | LBH; 21 | NZR; 9 | 500; 12 | MIL; 6 | DET; 2* | POR; 3 | CLE; 7 | TOR; 7 | MIS; 10 | MDO; 7 | ROA; 16 | VAN; 3 | LS; 10 | | | | | | 5th | 110 | |
| 1997 | Newman/Haas Racing | 11 | Swift 007.i | Ford XD V8t | MIA; 26 | SRF; 28 | LBH; Inj | NZR; Inj | RIO; Inj | STL; Inj | MIL; Inj | DET; Inj | POR; 4 | CLE; 6 | TOR; 11 | MIS; 16 | MDO; 21 | ROA; 4 | VAN; 9 | LS; 21 | FON; 9 | | | | | 15th | 42 | |
| 1998 | Newman/Haas Racing | 11 | Swift 009.c | Ford XD V8t | MIA; 4 | MOT; 25 | LBH; 26 | NZR; 11 | RIO; 21 | STL; 11 | MIL; DNS | DET; 17 | POR; 26 | CLE; 11 | TOR; 16 | MIS; 25 | MDO; 13 | ROA; 3 | VAN; 14 | LS; 9 | HOU; 27 | SRF; 3 | FON; 7 | | | 14th | 56 | |
| 1999 | Newman/Haas Racing | 11 | Swift 010.c | Ford XD V8t | MIA; 9 | MOT; 3 | LBH; 5 | NZR; 7 | **RIO**; 3 | STL; 9 | MIL; 6 | POR; 14 | CLE; 12 | ROA; 1 | TOR; 3 | MIS; 8 | DET; Inj | MDO; Inj | CHI; Inj | VAN; Inj | LS; Inj | HOU; 7 | SRF; 25 | FON; 3 | | 7th | 121 | |
| 2000 | Newman/Haas Racing | 11 | Lola B2K/00 | Ford XF V8t | MIA; 7 | LBH; 18 | RIO; 5 | MOT; 11 | NZR; 11 | MIL; 9 | DET; 19 | POR; 3 | CLE; 17 | TOR; 17 | MIS; 14 | CHI; DNS | MDO; 3 | ROA; 15 | VAN; 4 | LS; 10 | STL; 12 | HOU; 6 | SRF; 15 | FON; 1 | | 12th | 96 | |
| 2001 | Newman/Haas Racing | 11 | Lola B01/00 | Toyota RV8F V8t | MTY; 20 | LBH; 24 | TXS; NH | NZR; 5 | MOT; 4 | MIL; 18 | DET; 5 | POR; 3 | CLE; 11 | TOR; 12 | MIS; 18 | CHI; 25 | MDO; 8 | ROA; 18 | VAN; 11 | LAU; 19 | ROC; 24 | HOU; 8 | LS; 9 | SRF; 8 | FON; 13 | 15th | 70 | |
| 2002 | Newman/Haas Racing | 11 | Lola B02/00 | Toyota RV8F V8t | MTY; 3 | LBH; 13 | MOT; 12 | MIL; 4 | LS; 2 | POR; 13 | CHI; 14 | TOR; 3 | CLE; 12 | VAN; 13 | MDO; 2 | ROA; 6 | MTL; 7 | DEN; 5 | ROC; 17 | MIA; 2 | SRF; 11 | FON; 7 | MXC; 15 | | | 5th | 122 | |

==== Indianapolis 500 ====
| Year | Chassis | Engine | Start | Finish | Team |
|---|---|---|---|---|---|
| 1995 | Reynard | Ford-Cosworth | 27 | 2 | Walker Racing |

=== Complete A1 Grand Prix results ===
(key) (Races in bold indicate pole position) (Races in italics indicate fastest lap)

| Year | Entrant | 1 | 2 | 3 | 4 | 5 | 6 | 7 | 8 | 9 | 10 | 11 | 12 | 13 | 14 | 15 | 16 | 17 | 18 | 19 | 20 | 21 | 22 | DC | Points |
|---|---|---|---|---|---|---|---|---|---|---|---|---|---|---|---|---|---|---|---|---|---|---|---|---|---|
| 2005–06 | Brazil | GBR; SPR | GBR; FEA | GER; SPR | GER; FEA | POR; SPR | POR; FEA | AUS; SPR | AUS; FEA | MYS; SPR | MYS; FEA | UAE; SPR | UAE; FEA | RSA; SPR | RSA; FEA | IDN; SPR; 20 | IDN; FEA; 4 | MEX; SPR; 14 | MEX; FEA; 12 | USA; SPR; 13 | USA; FEA; Ret | CHN; SPR; 10 | CHN; FEA; Ret | 6th | 71 |

=== Complete Stock Car Brasil results ===
(key) (Races in bold indicate pole position) (Races in italics indicate fastest lap)

| Year | Team | Car | 1 | 2 | 3 | 4 | 5 | 6 | 7 | 8 | 9 | 10 | 11 | 12 | Pos | Points |
|---|---|---|---|---|---|---|---|---|---|---|---|---|---|---|---|---|
| 2005 | Terra-Avallone | Mitsubishi Lancer | INT; 18 | CTB; 10 | RIO; Ret | INT; 9 | CTB; 24 | LON; 16 | BSB; 7 | SCZ; Ret | TAR; 6 | ARG; Ret | RIO; Ret | INT; 7 | 23rd | 32 |
| 2006 | Terra-Avallone | Mitsubishi Lancer | INT | CTB; Ret | CGD; 26 | INT; Ret | LON; 15 | CTB | SCZ | | | | | | 27th | 9 |
| 2006 | RC3 Bassani | Chevrolet Astra | | | | | | | | BSB; 21 | TAR; 23 | ARG; 18 | RIO; 8 | INT; 24 | 27th | 9 |
| 2010 | Gramacho Competições | Chevrolet Vectra | INT; 19 | CTB; 21 | VEL; 17 | RIO; 18 | RBP; 16 | SAL; 23 | INT; Ret | CGD; 15 | LON; Ret | SCZ; Ret | BSB; Ret | CTB; Ret | 34th | 1 |

=== 24 Hours of Daytona results ===
| Year | Team | Co-drivers | Car | Class | Laps | Pos. | Class Pos. |
|---|---|---|---|---|---|---|---|
| 2003 | (United States) Bell Motorsports | (Belgium) Didier Theys (United States) Forest Barber (United States) Terry Borcheller | Doran JE4-Chevrolet | DP | 67 | DNF | DNF |
| 2004 | (United States) Bell Motorsports | (United Kingdom) Andy Pilgrim (United States) Forest Barber (United States) Terry Borcheller | Doran JE4-Pontiac | DP | 526 | **1st** | **1st** |
| 2005 | (United States) Kodak-Bell Motorsports | (Canada) Paul Tracy (United States) Terry Borcheller (Germany) Ralf Kelleners | Doran JE4-Pontiac | DP | 328 | DNF | DNF |
| 2006 | (United States) Cheever Racing | (United States) Eddie Cheever, Jr. (Canada) Patrick Carpentier | Crawford DP03-Lexus | DP | 669 | DNF | DNF |
| 2007 | (United States) Cheever Racing | (United States) Eddie Cheever, Jr. (France) Emmanuel Collard (Germany) Sascha Maassen | Crawford DP03-Porsche | DP | 601 | 24th | 14th |
| 2011 | (United States) Action Express Racing | (United States) Terry Borcheller (United States) J. C. France (Portugal) João Barbosa (Italy) Max Papis | Riley Mk. XI-Porsche | DP | 721 | **3rd** | **3rd** |
| 2012 | (United States) Action Express Racing | (United States) David Donohue (United States) Darren Law | Coyote Corvette DP | DP | 758 | 5th | 5th |
| 2013 | (United States) Action Express Racing | (Portugal) João Barbosa (United States) Burt Frisselle (Germany) Mike Rockenfeller | Coyote Corvette DP | DP | 708 | 4th | 4th |
| 2014 | (United States) Action Express Racing | (Portugal) João Barbosa (France) Sébastien Bourdais | Coyote Corvette DP | P | 695 | **1st** | **1st** |
| 2015 | (United States) Action Express Racing | (Portugal) João Barbosa (France) Sébastien Bourdais | Coyote Corvette DP | P | 740 | **2nd** | **2nd** |
| 2016 | (United States) Action Express Racing | (Portugal) João Barbosa (Portugal) Filipe Albuquerque (United States) Scott Pruett | Coyote Corvette DP | P | 731 | 4th | 4th |
| 2017 | (United States) Mustang Sampling Racing | (Portugal) João Barbosa (Portugal) Filipe Albuquerque | Cadillac DPi-V.R | P | 659 | **2nd** | **2nd** |
| 2018 | (United States) Mustang Sampling Racing | (Portugal) João Barbosa (Portugal) Filipe Albuquerque | Cadillac DPi-V.R | P | 808 | **1st** | **1st** |
| 2019 | (United States) Mustang Sampling Racing | (Portugal) João Barbosa (Portugal) Filipe Albuquerque | Cadillac DPi-V.R | DPi | 573 | 9th | 7th |

=== 24 Hours of Le Mans results ===
| Year | Team | Co-Drivers | Car | Class | Laps | Pos. | Class Pos. |
|---|---|---|---|---|---|---|---|
| 2006 | (United States) ACEMCO Motorsports | (United Kingdom) Johnny Mowlem (United States) Terry Borcheller | Saleen S7-R | GT1 | 337 | 12th | 7th |
| 2007 | (United Kingdom) Team Modena | (Spain) Antonio García (Netherlands) Jos Menten | Aston Martin DBR9 | GT1 | 318 | 17th | 10th |
| 2008 | (United Kingdom) Team Modena | (United States) Terry Borcheller (Netherlands) Jos Menten | Aston Martin DBR9 | GT1 | 302 | 30th | 8th |

=== Complete American Le Mans Series results ===
| Year | Entrant | Class | Chassis | Engine | 1 | 2 | 3 | 4 | 5 | 6 | 7 | 8 | 9 | 10 | 11 | Rank | Points |
|---|---|---|---|---|---|---|---|---|---|---|---|---|---|---|---|---|---|
| 2008 | Andretti Green Racing | LMP2 | Acura ARX-01b | Acura 3.4L V8 | SEB; 6 | STP; 5 | LBH; 4 | UTA; 7 | LIM | MID | AME | MOS | DET | PET | MON | 24th | 38 |

=== Complete IMSA SportsCar Championship results ===
(key)(Races in bold indicate pole position, Results are overall/class)

| Year | Team | Class | Make | Engine | 1 | 2 | 3 | 4 | 5 | 6 | 7 | 8 | 9 | 10 | 11 | Rank | Points |
|---|---|---|---|---|---|---|---|---|---|---|---|---|---|---|---|---|---|
| 2014 | Action Express Racing | P | Coyote Corvette DP | Chevrolet 5.5L V8 | DAY; 1 | SEB; 3 | LBH; 3 | LGA; 4 | DET; 6 | WGL; 3 | MOS; 4 | IMS; 1 | ELK; 1 | COA; 3 | PET; 2 | 1st | 349 |
| 2015 | Action Express Racing | P | Coyote Corvette DP | Chevrolet 5.5L V8 | DAY; 2 | SEB; 1 | LBH; 5 | LGA; 4 | **DET**; 3 | **WGL**; 3 | MOS; 5 | ELK; 2 | COA; 6 | PET; 1 | | 1st | 309 |
| 2016 | Action Express Racing | P | Coyote Corvette DP | Chevrolet 5.5L V8 | DAY; 4 | SEB; 3 | **LBH**; 2 | LGA; 7 | **DET**; 2 | WGL; 1 | MOS; 2 | ELK; 2 | COA; 3 | PET; 5 | | 2nd | 311 |
| 2017 | Mustang Sampling Racing | P | Cadillac DPi-V.R | Cadillac 6.2 L V8 | **DAY**; 2 | SEB; 2 | LBH; 7 | COA; 3 | **DET**; 4 | WGL; 1 | MOS; 6 | ELK; 6 | LGA; 5 | PET; 5 | | 3rd | 284 |
| 2018 | Mustang Sampling Racing | P | Cadillac DPi-V.R | Cadillac 5.5 L V8 | DAY; 1 | SEB; 10 | LBH | MDO | DET | WGL; 6 | MOS; 4 | ELK | LGA | PET; 4 | | 19th | 137 |
| 2019 | Mustang Sampling Racing | DPi | Cadillac DPi-V.R | Cadillac 5.5 L V8 | DAY; 7 | SEB | LBH | MDO | DET | WGL | MOS | ELK | LGA | PET | | 33rd | 24 |

=== NASCAR ===
(key) (Bold – Pole position awarded by qualifying time. Italics – Pole position earned by points standings or practice time. * – Most laps led.)

==== Winston Cup Series ====
NASCAR Winston Cup Series results
| Year | Team | No. | Make | 1 | 2 | 3 | 4 | 5 | 6 | 7 | 8 | 9 | 10 | 11 | 12 | 13 | 14 | 15 | 16 | 17 | 18 | 19 | 20 | 21 | 22 | 23 | 24 | 25 | 26 | 27 | 28 | 29 | 30 | 31 | 32 | 33 | 34 | 35 | 36 | NWCC | Pts | Ref |
|---|---|---|---|---|---|---|---|---|---|---|---|---|---|---|---|---|---|---|---|---|---|---|---|---|---|---|---|---|---|---|---|---|---|---|---|---|---|---|---|---|---|---|
| 2002 | Petty Enterprises | 44 | Dodge | DAY | CAR | LVS | ATL | DAR | BRI | TEX | MAR | TAL | CAL | RCH | CLT | DOV | POC | MCH | SON | DAY | CHI | NHA | POC | IND | GLN | MCH | BRI | DAR | RCH | NHA | DOV | KAN | TAL | CLT | MAR | ATL | CAR | PHO; 41 | HOM | 81st | 40 | |
| 2003 | Andy Petree Racing | 33 | Chevy | DAY; 35 | CAR | LVS | ATL | DAR | BRI | | | | | | | | | | | | | | | | | | | | | | | | | | | | | | | 44th | 857 | |
| 2003 | Petty Enterprises | 45 | Dodge | | | | | | | TEX; 38 | TAL | MAR | CAL | RCH | CLT | DOV | POC | | | | | | | | | | | | | | | | | | | | | | | 44th | 857 | |
| 2003 | Petty Enterprises | 43 | Dodge | | | | | | | | | | | | | | | MCH; 35 | SON; 40 | | CHI; 29 | NHA; 37 | POC; 24 | IND; DNQ | | MCH; 33 | BRI; 41 | DAR; 43 | RCH; 43 | NHA; 31 | | | | | | | | | | 44th | 857 | |
| 2003 | Petty Enterprises | 44 | Dodge | | | | | | | | | | | | | | | | | DAY; DNQ | | | | | GLN; 40 | | | | | | DOV; DNQ | TAL; 28 | KAN | CLT; 34 | MAR | ATL | PHO | CAR | HOM | 44th | 857 | |

===== Daytona 500 =====
| Year | Team | Manufacturer | Start | Finish |
|---|---|---|---|---|
| 2003 | Andy Petree Racing | Chevrolet | 34 | 35 |

==== Busch Series ====
NASCAR Busch Series results
| Year | Team | No. | Make | 1 | 2 | 3 | 4 | 5 | 6 | 7 | 8 | 9 | 10 | 11 | 12 | 13 | 14 | 15 | 16 | 17 | 18 | 19 | 20 | 21 | 22 | 23 | 24 | 25 | 26 | 27 | 28 | 29 | 30 | 31 | 32 | 33 | 34 | NBSC | Pts | Ref |
|---|---|---|---|---|---|---|---|---|---|---|---|---|---|---|---|---|---|---|---|---|---|---|---|---|---|---|---|---|---|---|---|---|---|---|---|---|---|---|---|---|
| 2001 | SKI Motorsports | 30 | Chevy | DAY | CAR | LVS | ATL | DAR | BRI | TEX | NSH | TAL | CAL | RCH | NHA | NZH | CLT | DOV | KEN | MLW | GLN | CHI | GTY | PPR | IRP | MCH | BRI | DAR | RCH | DOV | KAN | CLT | MEM | PHO | CAR | HOM; 39 | | 141st | 56 | |
| 2002 | SKI Motorsports | 30 | Chevy | DAY | CAR | LVS | DAR | BRI | TEX | NSH | TAL | CAL | RCH; DNQ | NHA | NZH | CLT; DNQ | DOV | NSH | KEN | MLW | DAY | CHI | GTY; 35 | PPR | IRP | MCH | BRI | DAR | RCH | DOV | KAN; 43 | CLT | MEM; QL^{†} | ATL | CAR | PHO | HOM | 102nd | 92 | |
^{†} – Qualified but replaced by Chad Chaffin

=== ARCA Re/Max Series ===
(key) (Bold – Pole position awarded by qualifying time. Italics – Pole position earned by points standings or practice time. * – Most laps led.)

ARCA Re/Max Series results
| Year | Team | No. | Make | 1 | 2 | 3 | 4 | 5 | 6 | 7 | 8 | 9 | 10 | 11 | 12 | 13 | 14 | 15 | 16 | 17 | 18 | 19 | 20 | 21 | 22 | ARSC | Pts | Ref |
|---|---|---|---|---|---|---|---|---|---|---|---|---|---|---|---|---|---|---|---|---|---|---|---|---|---|---|---|---|
| 2003 | Petty Enterprises | 43 | Dodge | DAY; 10 | ATL | NSH | SLM | TOL | KEN | CLT | BLN | KAN | MCH | LER | POC | POC; 31 | NSH | ISF | WIN | DSF | CHI | SLM | TAL | CLT | SBO | 101st | 255 | |

Sporting positions
| Preceded by Inaugural | Brazilian Formula Three Championship; Champion; 1989 | Succeeded by Oswaldo Negri |
| Preceded by Gabriel Furlán | Formula Three Sudamericana; Champion; 1990 | Succeeded by Affonso Giaffone |
| Preceded by Érik Comas | International Formula 3000; Champion; 1991 | Succeeded by Luca Badoer |
| Preceded by Inaugural | WeatherTech SportsCar Championship; 2014 - 2015; With: João Barbosa | Succeeded by Dane Cameron; Eric Curran |
Achievements
| Preceded by Jacques Villeneuve | Indianapolis 500 Rookie of the Year; 1995 | Succeeded by Tony Stewart |
