= ReadyLink =

VoIP phone service

ReadyLink was a "walkie-talkie" service, which used Session Initiation Protocol (SIP), offered by the Sprint Nextel Corporation, in an effort to compete with then-separate Nextel Communications. It was necessary to have a Sanyo or a Samsung ReadyLink capable phone and a matching service-plan in order to use this feature. ReadyLink sought to mimic the forerunning "MOTO Talk"/Nextel walkie-talkie service, except that ReadyLink was created to operate on the Sprint CDMA network. It was discontinued shortly after the Sprint PCS acquisition of Nextel Communications.

Sprint has replaced Readylink with Qualcomm's QChat. This technology will run over the Sprint high-speed EV-DO data network, giving it the closest comparable speeds to Motorola's iDEN Direct-Connect in the push-to-talk industry.

In Canada, the Bell Mobility network (including Aliant and SaskTel Mobility) implements similar technology with their 10-4 service. Some of the same phones are available, and Bell subscribers can roam with the service on Sprint's network.

Phones with ReadyLink:

- Samsung
  - Samsung SPH-A640
  - Samsung SPH-A760
  - Samsung SPH-A820
- Sanyo
  - Sanyo M1
  - Sanyo MM-5600
  - Sanyo MM-5660
  - Sanyo MM-7400
  - Sanyo MM-7500
  - Sanyo MM-8300
  - Sanyo MM-9000
  - Sanyo PM-8200
  - Sanyo RL-2000
  - Sanyo RL-2500
  - Sanyo RL-4920
  - Sanyo RL-4930
  - Sanyo RL-7300
  - Sanyo SCP-2400
  - Sanyo SCP-3100
  - Sanyo SCP-3200
  - Sanyo SCP-7000
  - Sanyo SCP-7300
  - Sanyo SCP-8400
  - Sanyo VI-2300
  - Sanyo VM-4500
