= 2003 Rolex Sports Car Series =

4th season of the racing series organized by Grand-Am

Seasons
- ← 2002 2004 →

The 2003 Rolex Sports Car Series season was the fourth season of the Rolex Sports Car Series run by the Grand American Road Racing Association. The season involved four classes, Daytona Prototypes (DP), Sports Racing Prototype II (SRPII), Grand Touring Sport (GTS), and Grand Touring (GT). 12 races were run from February 1, 2003 to November 2, 2003. Barber Motorsports Park was added.

== Schedule ==
Rnd	Race	Length/Duration	Circuit	Date
1	Rolex 24 at Daytona	24 Hours	Daytona International Speedway	February 1 February 2
2	Nextel Grand Prix of Miami	250 Miles	Homestead-Miami Speedway	March 1
3	AJ's Fine Foods 250	250 Miles	Phoenix International Raceway	May 3
4	Barber 250	250 Miles	Barber Motorsports Park	May 18
5	Grand American 400	400 km	California Speedway	June 8
6	Sahlen's Six Hours of the Glen	6 Hours	Watkins Glen International	June 22
7	Mid-Ohio Road Racing Classic	400 km	Mid-Ohio Sports Car Course	June 28
8	Paul Revere 250	250 Miles	Daytona International Speedway	July 3
9	Bully Hill Vineyards 250	250 Miles	Watkins Glen International	August 8
10	6 Hours of Mont-Tremblant	6 Hours	Circuit Mont-Tremblant	September 21
11	VIR 400	400 km	Virginia International Raceway	October 5
12	Grand American Champions Weekend	3 Hours	Daytona International Speedway	November 2

== Results ==
Overall winners in bold.

Rnd	Circuit	DP Winning Teams	SRPII Winning Teams	GTS Winning Teams	GT Winning Teams
Rnd	Circuit	DP Winning Drivers	SRPII Winning Drivers	GTS Winning Drivers	GT Winning Drivers
1	Daytona	(Canada) #88 Multimatic Motorsports	(United States) #5 Team Seattle/Essex Racing	(France) #24 Perspective Racing	**(United States) #66 The Racers Group**
1	Daytona	(Canada) Scott Maxwell (Australia) David Brabham (Canada) David Empringham	(Canada) Ross Bentley (United States) Don Kitch (United States) Joe Pruskowski (United States) Justin Pruskowski	(France) Jérôme Policand (Portugal) João Barbosa (Belgium) Michel Neugarten (United Kingdom) Andy Wallace	**(United States) Kevin Buckler** **(United States) Michael Schrom** **(Germany) Jörg Bergmeister** **(Germany) Timo Bernhard**
2	Homestead	**(United States) #59 Brumos Racing**	(United States) #80 G&W Motorsports	(United States) #18 Murray's Speed & Custom	(United States) #33 Scuderia Ferrari of Washington
2	Homestead	**(United States) J. C. France** **(United States) Hurley Haywood**	(United States) Steve Marshall (United States) Danny Marshall (United States) Shawn Bayliff	(United States) Jon Leavy (United States) Ken Bupp	(United States) Cort Wagner (United States) Brent Martini
3	Phoenix	**(United States) #59 Brumos Racing**	(United States) #80 G&W Motorsports^{1}	(United States) #48 Heritage Motorsports	(United States) #33 Scuderia Ferrari of Washington
3	Phoenix	**(United States) J. C. France** **(United States) Hurley Haywood**	(United States) Steve Marshall (United States) Danny Marshall (United States) Shawn Bayliff	(United States) Tommy Riggins (United States) David Machavern	(United States) Cort Wagner (United States) Brent Martini
4	Barber	**(United States) #54 Bell Motorsports**	No Entries	(United States) #31 Mosler Automotive	(United States) #69 Marcus Motorsports
4	Barber	**(United States) Forest Barber** **(United States) Terry Borcheller**	No Entries	(Portugal) João Barbosa (United Kingdom) Justin Bell	(United States) Brian Cunningham (United States) Hugh Plumb
5	California	**(United States) #58 Brumos Racing**	No Entries	(United States) #48 Heritage Motorsports	(United States) #33 Scuderia Ferrari of Washington
5	California	**(United States) David Donohue** **(United States) Mike Borkowski**	No Entries	(United States) Tommy Riggins (United States) David Machavern	(United States) Cort Wagner (United States) Brent Martini
6	Watkins Glen	**(United States) #58 Brumos Racing**	(United States) #80 G&W Motorsports	(United States) #48 Heritage Motorsports	(United States) #83 Rennwerks Motorsports
6	Watkins Glen	**(United States) David Donohue** **(United States) Mike Borkowski** **(Canada) Scott Goodyear**	(United States) Steve Marshall (United States) Robert Prilika (United States) Shawn Bayliff	(United States) Tommy Riggins (United States) David Machavern (United States) Scott Lagasse	(United States) Seth Neiman (United States) Johannes van Overbeek (United States) Lonnie Pechnik
7	Mid-Ohio	**(United States) #54 Bell Motorsports**	(United States) #80 G&W Motorsports^{1}	(United States) #48 Heritage Motorsports	(United States) #98 Schumacher Racing
7	Mid-Ohio	**(United States) Forest Barber** **(United States) Terry Borcheller**	(United States) Steve Marshall (United States) Danny Marshall (United States) Shawn Bayliff	(United States) Tommy Riggins (United States) David Machavern	(United States) Larry Schumacher (United States) B. J. Zacharias
8	Daytona	**(United States) #54 Bell Motorsports**	(United States) #80 G&W Motorsports^{1}	(United States) #48 Heritage Motorsports	(United States) #33 Scuderia Ferrari of Washington
8	Daytona	**(United States) Forest Barber** **(United States) Terry Borcheller**	(United States) Steve Marshall (United States) Robert Prilika (United States) Shawn Bayliff	(United States) Tommy Riggins (United States) David Machavern	(United States) Cort Wagner (United States) Brent Martini
9	Watkins Glen	**(United States) #54 Bell Motorsports**	No Entries	(United States) #05 Team Re/Max Racing	(United States) #33 Scuderia Ferrari of Washington
9	Watkins Glen	**(United States) Forest Barber** **(United States) Terry Borcheller**	No Entries	(United States) Rick Carelli (United States) John Metcalf (United States) David Liniger	(United States) Cort Wagner (United States) Brent Martini
10	Mont-Tremblant	**(United States) #58 Brumos Racing**	No Entries	(United States) #48 Heritage Motorsports	(United States) #33 Scuderia Ferrari of Washington
10	Mont-Tremblant	**(United States) David Donohue** **(United States) Mike Borkowski** **(Germany) Sascha Maassen**	No Entries	(United States) Tommy Riggins (Portugal) João Barbosa (United States) David Machavern	(United States) Cort Wagner (United States) Brent Martini
11	Virginia	**(United States) #54 Bell Motorsports**	(United States) #12 G&W Motorsports	(United States) #06 ICY/SL Motorsports	(United States) #33 Scuderia Ferrari of Washington
11	Virginia	**(United States) Forest Barber** **(United States) Andy Pilgrim** **(United States) Terry Borcheller**	(United States) Davy Jones (United States) Robert Prilika (United States) Danny Marshall	(United States) Paul Alderman (United States) Dave Rosenblum (United States) Steve Lisa	(United States) Cort Wagner (United States) Brent Martini
12	Daytona	**(United States) #54 Bell Motorsports**	(United States) #80 G&W Motorsports^{1}	(United States) #40 Derhaag Motorsports	(United States) #33 Scuderia Ferrari of Washington
12	Daytona	**(United States) Forest Barber** **(United States) Terry Borcheller**	(United States) Davy Jones (United States) Robert Prilika (United States) Joe Masessa	(United States) Simon Gregg (United Kingdom) Justin Bell	(United States) Cort Wagner (United States) Brent Martini

^{1} - did not finish the race.
