= Terry Borcheller =

American racing driver (born 1966)

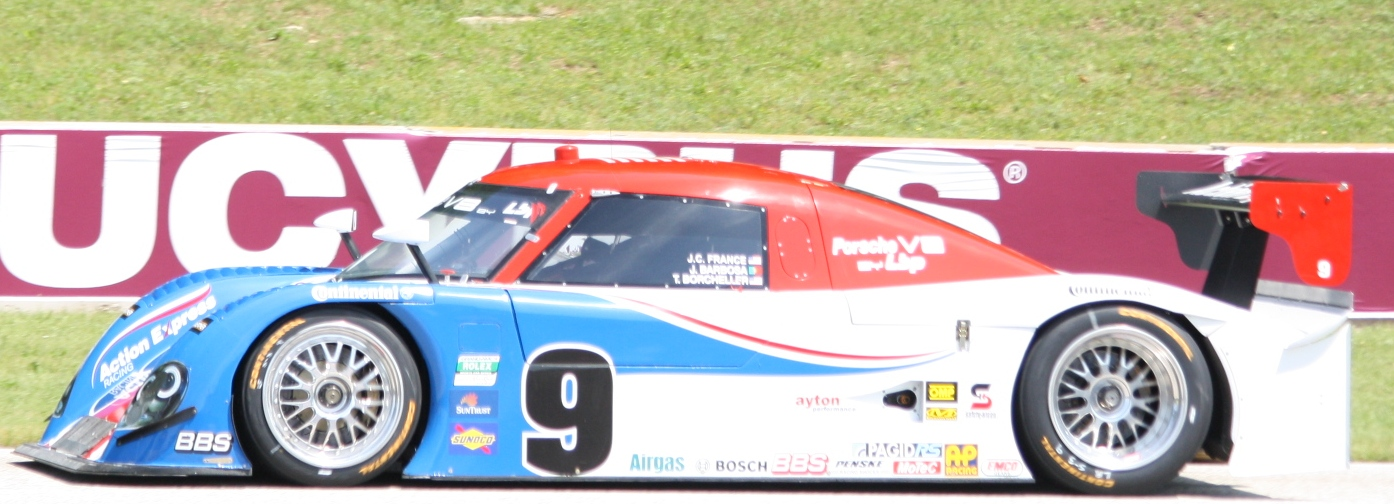
- Borcheller's Action Express Riley in 2011
- Nationality: (United States) American
- Born: Terry Joe Borcheller; March 22, 1966 (age 60) Hialeah, Florida, United States
- Categorisation: FIA Gold (until 2015); FIA Silver (2016–2021); FIA Bronze (2022–)

Terry Joe Borcheller (born March 22, 1966, in Hialeah, Florida) is an American professional racing driver who races in the Grand American Road Racing Association Rolex Sports Car Series and American Le Mans Series.

As a teenager, Borcheller was the World Karting Association national champion in 1983. He began his professional career in the Barber Saab Pro Series in 1991. In 1998, he won the IMSA Speedvision cup in the GS class and the SPEED World Challenge T-1 class championship in a Saleen Mustang. In 2000, he captured the Rolex Sports Car Series GTO class championship in a Saleen Mustang. The following year, he drove a Saleen S7-R in the American Le Mans Series and won the GTS class championship. The following year, he returned to the Rolex series and captured SRP II class honors in a Lola-Nissan. Following the realignment of that series class structure the following year, Borcheller was the champion of that series top class, Daytona Prototype in a Chevrolet powered Doran. The following year, he won the 24 Hours of Daytona with teammates Christian Fittipaldi, Forest Barber, and Andy Pilgrim in a Pontiac powered Doran and finished ninth in the championship. He stayed with the Doran team through the 2006 season as the team began to fall behind the teams using the more heavily developed and popular Riley and Crawford chassis.

In 2007, Borcheller competed in a handful of races in various levels of Grand Am competition including DP, GT, and Koni Challenge as well as returning to ALMS to race for Team Trans Sport in 11 races in their GT2 class Porsche 911. In 2008, he drove in the 24 Hours of Daytona in the Brumos Porsche then raced full-time in the ALMS in the Bell Motorsports GT1 class Aston Martin DBR9 as well as racing in the 24 Hours of Le Mans in the Team Modena DBR9. He also finished out the Rolex Sports Car Series season in the Autohaus Motorsports GT class Pontiac GXP.R

Borcheller has raced at Le Mans five times with a best finish of third in class in 2001 with the Saleen S7-R.

Borcheller is an avid participant in Christian motorsports ministries such as Racin' for Jesus. He and his family currently reside in Vero Beach, Florida.

== Racing record ==
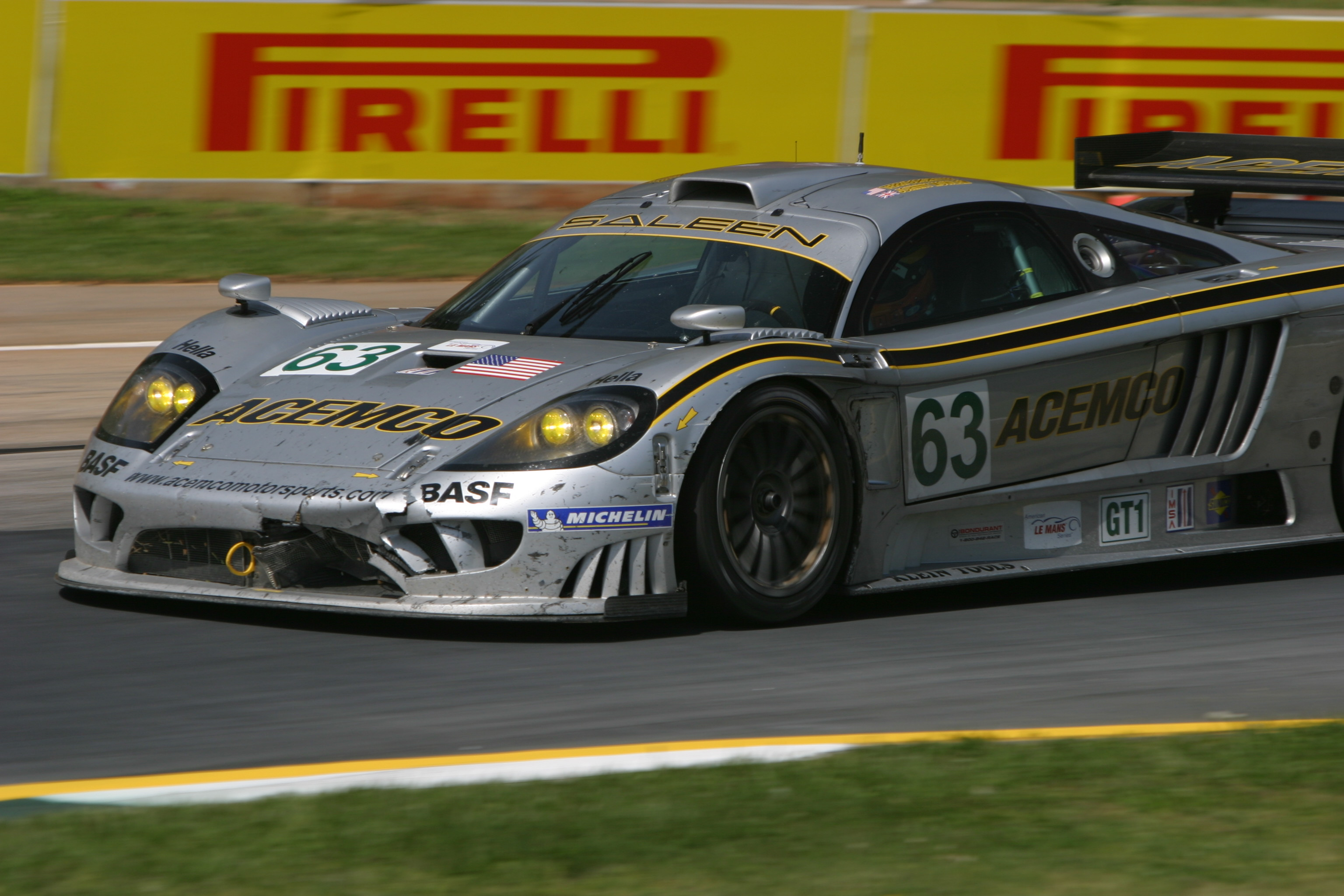
Borcheller racing a Saleen S7R in 2004.

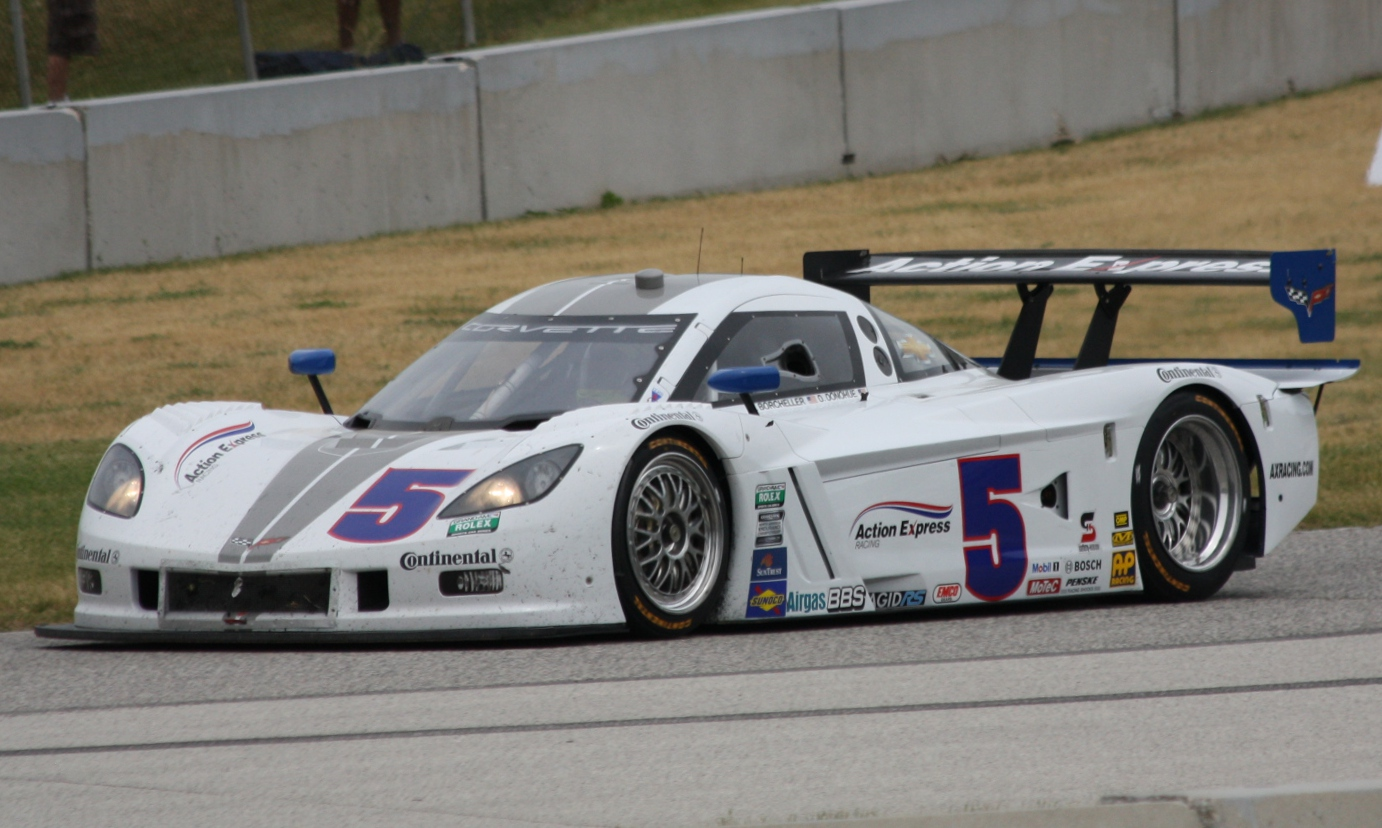
Borcheller's Corvette DP in 2012, his last season in Grand-Am.

=== SCCA National Championship Runoffs ===
Year	Track	Car	Engine	Class	Finish	Start	Status
1991	Road Atlanta	Ford Mustang	Ford	Showroom Stock GT	13	24	Running

=== 24 Hours of Le Mans results ===
Year	Team	Co-Drivers	Car	Class	Laps	Pos.	Class Pos.
2001	(United States) Saleen-Allen Speedlab	(Austria) Franz Konrad (United Kingdom) Oliver Gavin	Saleen S7-R	GTS	246	18th	3rd
2002	(Germany) Konrad Motorsport	(Switzerland) Toni Seiler (Austria) Franz Konrad	Saleen S7-R	GTS	266	26th	7th
2003	(United States) Risi Competizione	(United States) Anthony Lazzaro (Germany) Ralf Kelleners	Ferrari 360 Modena GT	GT	269	26th	8th
2006	(United States) ACEMCO Motorsports	(United Kingdom) Johnny Mowlem (Brazil) Christian Fittipaldi	Saleen S7-R	GT1	337	12th	7th
2008	(United Kingdom) Team Modena	(Brazil) Christian Fittipaldi (Netherlands) Jos Menten	Aston Martin DBR9	GT1	302	30th	8th

Sporting positions
Preceded by Olivier Beretta	American Le Mans Series GTS Champion; 2001	Succeeded by Ron Fellows
Preceded by First	Rolex Sports Car Series DP Champion; 2003	Succeeded by Max Papis; Scott Pruett
