= Brian McAuley =

American entrepreneur

Brian McAuley (born 1941) is an American entrepreneur and co-founder of Nextel Communications.

In 1987, McAuley was a cellular executive when he and lawyer Morgan O'Brien founded Fleet Call, a telecom company, in New Jersey. It was renamed Nextel Communications in 1993, and grew rapidly with the support of Motorola, before merging with Sprint Corporation in 2005 for $35 billion. The new company became the third-largest wireless network operator in the United States. McAuley previously served as president and CEO of Nextel Communications for seven years. He also founded Boston-based mobile radio systems operator NeoWorld Communications in 1999, and served as its president and CEO. It was acquired by Nextel for $276 million in 2003.

He was chairman of NASDAQ-listed Pacific DataVision, Inc., provider of mobile workforce management solutions. He is also a director for NYSE-listed United Rentals, Inc. and sits on the board for many non-profits.

Brian McAuley holds a bachelor's degree in Business Administration from Adelphi University. He was inducted into the Wireless Hall of Fame in 2015, and resides in Franklin Lakes, New Jersey.

== See also ==
- Nextel Communications
