= A640 =

A640 may refer to:

- A640 road (England)
- Canon PowerShot A640, a camera
- Quebec Autoroute 640, a road in Canada
- Samsung SPH-A640, a mobile phone
