= Morgan E. O'Brien =

Morgan Edward O'Brien (born 1944), chairman of Cyren Call Communications, is a pioneer in U.S. wireless telecommunications who helped shape the wireless industry throughout his career.

As the co-founder and chairman of Nextel Communications, Inc. (now part of Sprint Nextel Corp.), O'Brien led the creation of the first all-digital nationwide wireless network (the Nextel National Network using iDEN technology developed by Motorola for Nextel) and brought push-to-talk (PTT) communication to the mass business and consumer market. In 2001 O'Brien was inducted into the Wireless Hall of Fame for his role in the cellular industry.
