= Motorola i870 =

Cellular telephone

The Motorola i870 is a clam-style cellular telephone designed for use with iDEN Networks. It was released for SouthernLINC networks in mid-October 2005, and for Nextel on October 31, 2005 as a replacement for the i860. A variation of this phone, the i875, was released for Boost Mobile as a replacement for the i860 Tattoo.

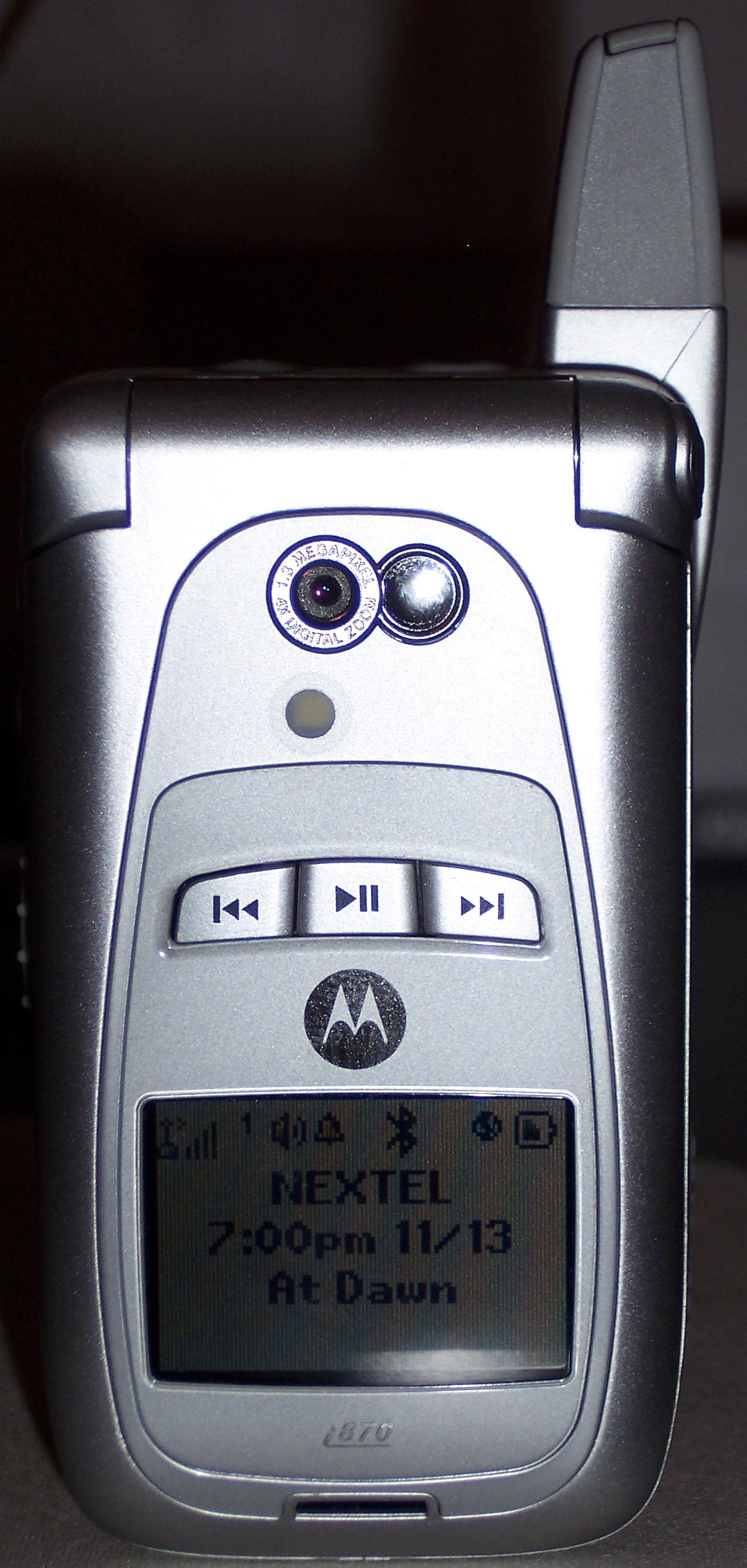
Motorola i870, unopened.

== Background ==
Like the Motorola i850, i760, and even the i920/i930, the i870 sports WiDEN compliance with band support for both iDEN 800 and 900. The iDEN 900 band is also supported, helping relieve 800 MHz spectrum pressures during Sprint's 800 MHz rebanding effort, moving iDEN up to 862-869 MHz while public safety radios utilize spectrum from 851-860 MHz.

Unlike the i930, the i870 does not operate under Windows Mobile 2003. While this is the case, it utilizes Bluetooth support with OBEX and hands-free earpiece compliance first found on the i605 (the i605 was not well-received due to its monolith form-factor).

The i870 sports the same display properties as with the i860 (96x64 12-bit LCD STN external, 176x220 18-bit LCD TFT/TFD internal, both color displays).

The i870 adds selective dynamic group call, MP3 support from 8-192 kbit/s (up to 320 kbit/s with a firmware update), external music controls, MIDI/WAV support, and TransFlash/Micro SD support for cards up to 2 GB-to-date. The i870 also features an improved camera found on the i850, but the resolution has been increased to 1.3 megapixels, and the video recording up to 30 seconds is limited only to the size of memory. Other than the added features new for the i870, the phone retains all the features that made the i860 one of Motorola's hot-selling iDEN phones.

The i870 is the first phone to feature AgION anti-microbial housing, which is said to negate product erosion due to germ contact. An updated version of the i870, the Motorola i880, also sports this feature.

== Regulatory information ==
The phone was approved by the FCC with the ID of AZ489FT5846 on August 26, 2005. A Class II Permissive Change was issued on September 30, 2005 for Hearing Aid compatibility purposes.

== See also ==
- Motorola iDEN phone models
- Sprint Nextel
- Telus
