= NII Holdings =

American holding company

NII Holdings, Inc.
- Formerly: McCaw International (1995-1997); Nextel International (1997-2001)
- Type: Public
- Traded as: Nasdaq: NIHD (2003-2020)
- Industry: Wireless Services
- Predecessor: Nextel
- Founded: 1995
- Defunct: January 13, 2020
- Fate: Dissolved
- Headquarters: Reston, Virginia, United States
- Area served: Latin America
- Key people: Roberto Rittes (CEO)
- Products: High-speed networks, Two way messaging, Push to Talk
- Revenue: $870 million (2018)
- Number of employees: 16,089
- Website: www.nii.com

NII Holdings, Inc. (formerly Nextel International) was an American holding company that, through its subsidiary Nextel Telecomunicações Ltda., provided mobile communications services under the Nextel brand in Latin America. NII last operated 3G UMTS/HSDPA and 4G LTE networks in Brazil, and also operated an iDEN network there until its shutdown in 2018.

On December 18, 2019, NII Holdings completed the sale of its Brazilian operation, its last remaining subsidiary, to América Móvil. On January 13, 2021 the company filed a Certificate of Dissolution (liquidation) with the State of Delaware.

In 2012, for the third consecutive year, NII Holdings ranked in the Fortune 500 and Barron's 500 lists. NII also has been named one of the best places to work among multinationals in Latin America by the Great Place to Work Institute.

NII went through bankruptcy in 2014 and 2015.

== History ==
NII originally launched as the international business unit of Nextel Communications as McCaw International in 1995. Later Nextel changes its name to Nextel international in 1997.

Nextel Mexico and Nextel Peru began operating in 1998, and Nextel Chile in 2000.

Nextel International changed its name to NII Holdings in 2001.

=== Divestiture of minority interests ===
NII Holdings sold its 12% minority interest in Shanghai CCT-McCaw Telecommunications Systems Co., Ltd in March 2000, after it was informed by China Unicom that its financing structure was no longer permitted by Chinese regulations. Due to unfavorable market conditions, NII Holdings sold their 21% minority interest of NEXNET Co (Nextel Japan) to Motorola for 10 million in exchange for forgiveness of debt owed to Motorola in 2001. NII Holdings also sold their fourteen percent minority interest in Telus for 196 million dollars also in the year 2001.

=== First bankruptcy and reorganization ===
NII Holdings' Nextel Argentina operating company failed to make a principal payment of $108 million in December 2001. In February 2002, NII Holdings failed to make a 41 million dollar interest payment on a 650 million dollar bond as well, seeking to preserve cash while it restructured its debts and implemented a revised business plan. NII Holdings filed its first chapter 11 bankruptcy in May and exited from bankruptcy on November 12, 2002, with Nextel owning 36% of the restructured company. Following its bankruptcy restructuring, NII Holdings began trading a NII on NASDAQ as NIHD in 2003.

==== Discontinuation and divestiture of Nextel Philippines ====
Nextel Philippines started operations in 1995. But due to poor operating performance, being in violation of Philippine ownership laws, as well as an attempt to save cash, NII Holdings decided to stop funding its Nextel Communications Philippines, Inc operations at the end of fiscal year 2001. By the end of the fourth quarter of the fiscal year 2002, NII Holdings sold its 59.1% share in Nextel Philippines with its 53,80 subscribers for $23.5 million to the Velarde group Next Mobile.

=== Quarterly report amendments ===
On October 27, 2004, NII amended its 2003 annual report on Form 10-K and its quarterly reports on Form 10-Q for the first and second quarters of 2004, correcting errors. On March 7, 2005, the company said it would restate financial statements for the entirety of 2003 and the first nine months of 2004 after finding accounting errors.

=== Agreement with Televisa ===
In February 2010, NII Holdings and Grupo Televisa signed a definitive agreement under which Televisa would have acquired an equity stake in Nextel Mexico. Under the agreement, Televisa would have invested $1.44 billion in cash for an initial 30% equity stake in Nextel Mexico, which implies Nextel Mexico's pre-investment value at $4.3 billion. On October 19, 2010, however, vice president and COO in Mexico Gustavo Cantu announced the partnership had been terminated by mutual agreement. More recently Cantu spoke about the future of content and telecommunications in Mexico.

=== Divestiture of Nextel Peru and Chile ===
In August 2013, NII Holdings completed the sale of Nextel Peru to Entel for 400 million dollars.

In August 2014, NII Holdings sold Nextel Chile to Fucata, S.A Fucata was subsequently acquired by the British investment firm Novator Partners in 2015, and the Nextel Chile network was rebranded as WOM (es) in July that same year.

=== Second bankruptcy and reorganization ===
On January 26, 2015, it was announced that AT&T had entered into an agreement with NII Holdings, Inc. to acquire its wireless business in Mexico for US$1.875 billion, less the outstanding net debt of the business at closing, in a transaction pursuant to Section 363 of the U.S. Bankruptcy Code.

==== Decline and mismanagement ====
In a 2014 article on problems leading to Nextel Mexico's bankruptcy, CNN interviewed employees noting a lack of corporate accessibility. President Peter Foyo had moved to Cancun around 2010, for example, where Nextel had no corporate presence, and some of the company's other management later followed suit. In a restructuring, in 2013 Foyo was appointed vice president of business development out of the United States, with his successor John McMahon becoming interim president. Gustavo Cantu remained COO, leaving the following year.

According to CNN, Nextel Mexico also reacted too slowly to Sprint's announcement of that it was shutting down its iDEN network in 2012. Sprint's iDEN shutdown eliminated Nextel Mexico's main competitive advantage, which was free calls to the United States. After Sprint shut down the network, many regions of Northern Mexico lost coverage that was provided by Sprint via roaming agreements. This resulted in a loss of one million subscribers in the following quarter, leaving Nextel Mexico with 2.93 million subscribers. After Nextel Mexico coverage degraded due to Sprint's iDEN Shutdown, Nextel Mexico also delayed the deployment of the 30Mhz of Spectrum that it acquired in the 1.7 and 2.1 GHz bands in 2010 resulting in additional subscriber losses in Mexico.

==== Defaulting on bonds ====
Due to falling subscriber count in Mexico and mounting debt of US$5.8 billion, NII Holdings opted to not pay $118.8 million in interest obligations on senior notes that were due on August 15, 2014. On September 15, 2014 NII filed for bankruptcy protection after losing 77 thousand subscribers and $629 million in the previous quarter.

==== Divestiture of Mexican assets ====
On April 30, 2015, NII Holdings finalized the sale of Nextel Mexico, of which it held control for 18 years, for $1.875 billion. NII Holdings ended up with $1.448 billion in net proceeds after paying off a defaulted debt balance of $350.5 million, seeking to repay in full the outstanding principal and accrued interest due under its debtor-in-possession loan that it borrowed in March 2015.

== Post-bankruptcy and Nextel Argentina sale ==
NII Holdings exited bankruptcy with court approval on June 29, 2015, offering 100 million shares of new common stock and $745 million in cash to its debt holders under its old stock ticker NIHD. In September of the same year, NII Holdings announced that they sold 49% percent of Nextel Argentina to Grupo Clarin, further reducing its operations in the Argentinian market in favor of growing Brazilian operations. On January 29, 2016, NII Holdings completed selling its remaining shares of Nextel Argentina to Clarín Group.

== Wireless operations ==
Currently NII Holdings operates Nextel Brazil offering post paid wireless voice and data services. Nextel Brazil operates the following networks:

| Radio frequency range | Band number | Generation | Radio Interface | Status |
|---|---|---|---|---|
| 2100 MHz | 1 | 3G | UMTS | Active |
| 800 MHz | 27 | 4G | LTE | Planned |
| 1800 MHz | 3 | 4G | LTE | Currently Deploying |
