= Avallone Motorsport =

Brazilian motorsport team, 1996–2009

(Brazil) Avallone Motorsport
- Founded: 1996
- Folded: 2009
- Team principal(s): José Avallone Neto; Antônio Carlos Avallone.

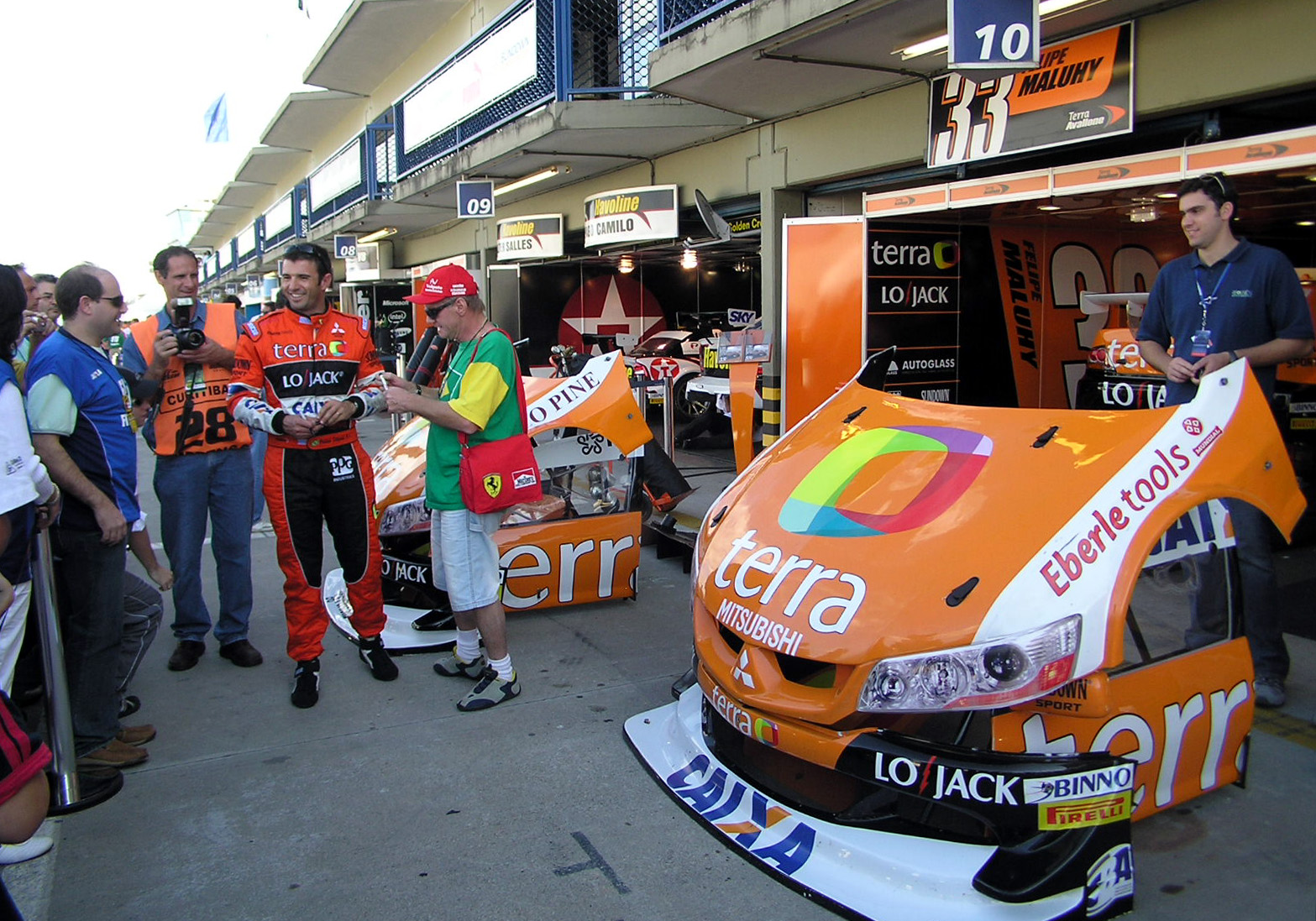
Stock Car V8 Brasil 2006 Terra-Avallone

Avallone Motorsport was a traditional Brazilian motorsport team owned by Avallone family created in 1996 in São Paulo, Brazil.
