= MOTO Talk =

Cell phone feature

MOTO Talk is a feature on some Motorola iDEN cellular phone handsets which allows users to make short-range 'push-to-talk' calls to other such handsets without being on the iDEN network. This feature goes by different names on iDEN service providers. In the US, Nextel called it 'DirectTalk' and included it as a free service on most new models of Motorola handsets. Boost Mobile disabled the function via handset software settings. SouthernLINC calls it LINCaround and ships handsets with the feature disabled. It can be enabled after paying an activation fee of $20. In Canada, TELUS calls it "Mike's Talk-Around."

It is the same system as used with Motorola's stand-alone DTR-series walkie-talkies, but DTR handsets and iDEN handsets set to MOTO Talk are not able to communicate with each other due to software settings. Motorola Solutions Inc sells DTR series two-ways radios that carry this peer to peer protocol. It can be used for voice communication, as well as SMS (short message services) between devices over more than 8 miles in flat terrain conditions.

MOTO Talk is not the same as the on-network 'DirectConnect' push-to-talk service. Signals are sent directly from one handset to another, rather than using the cellular network as DirectConnect does. MOTO Talk uses the 900 MHz ISM band rather than the frequencies allocated for iDEN cellular phone service, usually in the 800 MHz cellular band in the US and Canada.

There are ten "channels" or "hop sets" or "frequency hop groups" available in MOTO Talk, and fifteen privacy codes per channel. In addition, "private calls" can be placed using the phone number assigned to the handset being called.

The effective range can be in excess of 8 miles in flat terrain, but the frequencies used are line-of-sight and are blocked by structures and vegetation. Practical ranges are usually 1 to 2 miles.

The MOTO Talk service is slightly similar to FRS (Family Radio Service) walkie-talkies but uses digital rather than analog signals, operates on the 900 MHz ISM band rather than the 462 MHz frequencies allocated to FRS, and uses frequency-hopping spread spectrum technology rather than single fixed frequencies for each channel.

On each phone the MOTO Talk entry varies between 'MotoTalk' and 'DirecTalk' depending on the age of the phone and the branded carrier (Boost Mobile or Nextel). Otherwise, they are the identical function with a different name. Boost Mobile phones are not enabled for MOTO Talk use by default but can enabled by modifying the codeplug of the device (The Motorola i415 has the codeplug entry but not the needed transceiver hardware. As of 2011, it is the only device from Boost on the iDEN network that cannot use MOTO Talk.)

The off network feature on the iDEN phones work for up to a six-mile radius and will communicate with all other iDEN phones in the area on the same channel and code access number.

The off network walkie talkie feature has a total of 10 channels on newer phones and within those 10 channels, the phones can handle 15 separate group codes. This means there can be 15 conversations operating on each of the 10 channels within any single 6 miles radius. As with FRS and GMRS radios, the 15 group codes work to block calls that are not on the same code. The group codes do not secure your conversation. Only one person can talk on a code at a time. The phone can listen to all activity on a channel, but cannot transmit when in this "receive-all" mode. It uses FHSS technology on the 900 MHz ISM band as an unlicensed transmitter.

They use similar commercial radio transmission systems for DTR Digital series businesses but they are not compatible with each other, because they are configured differently by software. (Deliberately made by Motorola) In the DTMT Mode they transmit with 600mW and in the band ISM of 900 MHz (902–907, 915–928) they use the type of digital modulation 8-level FSK 900 MHz ISM FHSS.

In 10 channels and 15 codes (can be made safer using the radio's own ID) Frequency Hopping Spread Spectrum is a spread spectrum modulation technique in which the signal is emitted Over a series of seemingly random radio frequencies, jumping from frequency to frequency synchronously with the transmitter. Unauthorized receivers will hear an unintelligible signal. If you try to intercept the signal, you would only get it for a few moments and hear data. A broad spectrum transmission offers three main advantages:

1. Signals in spread spectrum are highly resistant to noise and interference.
2. Signals in spread spectrum are difficult to intercept. A transmission of this type sounds as a short-lived noise, or as an increase in noise at any receiver, except for the one using the sequence that was used by the transmitter. Broadcast spectrum transmissions can share a frequency band with many types of conventional transmissions with minimal interference.
3. The signals can not be interfered in a conventional manner (blocking the TX/RX frequency). More sophisticated equipment such as jamming equipment that interferes with the entire frequency band must be used.

== iDEN model compatibility ==
MOTO Talk is available on these iDEN models:

Model	Battery Capacity	Weight Grams	Phone Type
i680	1750mAh	158.7g	Flip
ic902	1100mAh	134.9g	Flip
i880	910mAh	123.0g	Flip
i870/i875	1010mAh	128.0g	Flip
i850	910mAh	120.0g	Classic
i760	910mAh	133.0g	Classic
i670	910mAh	155.0g	Flip
i580	1170mAh	139.0g	Classic
i560	750mAh	130.0g	Flip Rugged
ic502	750mAh	115.0g	Flip
ic402	1100mAh	126.0g	Flip
i315	1450mAh	197.0g	Bar Rugged B.W.
i355	1450mAh	199.0g	Bar Rugged Color
i365	1450mAh	190.0g	Bar Rugged Color
i325is	750mAh	199.0g	Bar Rugged Color
i275	750mAh	130.0g	Bar Color
i9	930mAh	133.0g	Flip
M710	Direct DC	250.0g	Car Phone 3w
i425	800mAh	111.0g	Bar Color
i576	1800mAh	119.0g	Flip
r765/r765is	800mAh	111.0g	Bar Color (1.0w/0.6w)
i570	850mAh	130.0g	Flip
i786	1130mAh	115.0g	Flip
i776	910mAh	101.0g	Flip
i296	910mAh	84.0g	Bar Color
i335	1000mAh	99.0g	Bar Color
i856	1140mAh	85.0g	Slider Color
i886	1380mAh	141.0g	Qwerty Slider Color

== See also ==
- Sprint Nextel
- Direct Connect
- SouthernLINC Wireless
- Mike (cellular network)
- Push to Talk over Cellular
- Walkie talkie
