= Samsung SPH-A640 =

Mobile phone model

- Manufacturer: Samsung Electronics
- Availability by region: 2006
- Compatible networks: PCS, PTT
- Dimensions: 3.6 x 1.8 x 0.91 in (91 x 46 x 23 mm)
- Weight: 3.2 oz (91 g)
- Memory: 4 MB
- Battery: 800 mAh Li-Ion
- Rear camera: VGA camera
- Display: 128 x 160 pixel TFT LCD
- External display: Organic LED display
- Connectivity: Bluetooth

The Samsung SPH-A640 (also A640) is a tri-mode dual band cellular telephone developed for PCS carriers like Sprint Nextel in the United States and Virgin Mobile in Canada. It was released in mid to late 2006 in most areas in the United States and other countries such as Canada.

== Specifications ==
The A640 has features that include SMS messaging and Push to talk walkie-talkie technology, VGA rear camera, voice recognition and Bluetooth technology, depending on the carrier. It contains an internal antenna, but removing a protector behind the battery slot reveals an external antenna slot.

The A640 has a 1.75 inch internal 65k ufb TFT LCD and 1.82 inch display with external Organic LED monochrome external display. The external display shows the date, time, battery life, signal strength and caller ID (if available).

The rear camera of A640 does not have LED flash. The camera has self timer, cropping (Fun Frame), color tone options and, brightness and white balance controls. Also, the camera has three resolution options that are high (640x480 pixels), medium (320x240 pixels) and low (224x168 pixels), respectively. It lacks MP3 or video recording capabilities.

With dimensions of 3.6 x 1.8 x 0.09 inches and weighing 3.2 ounces, the Samsung SPH-A640 comes with a Standard 800 mAh Li-Ion Battery, Travel Charger, and User Manual.

There is no way to unlock this device for use on other networks besides the specific CDMA network for which the phone was built.

== Reception ==
Kent German from CNET reviewed the Sprint model of Samsung SPH-A640 and gave it 6.6 out of 10 points. He praised the clear call quality, and considered the VGA camera, Bluetooth and speakerphone as the pros of the device. However, he criticized the design and noted that it was difficult to hear the speakerphone calls in loud environments. He concluded that Samsung SPH-A640 was a "functional and well-performing cell phone for midrange users".
