= Forest Barber =

American racing driver (born 1952)

Forest Barber (born October 3, 1952) is an American racing driver from Fort Worth, Texas.

Barber began his racing career on a motorcycle, participating in motocross and enduro riding. He later won five national and world championships in offshore powerboat racing from 1997 to 1999. He moved to sports car racing shortly thereafter and was a winning car owner and co-driver of the Bell Motorsports Doran-Chevrolet in the 2004 24 Hours of Daytona. He began racing part-time in 2005 and 2006 and has since retired from racing.
