= IDEN =

Mobile telecommunications technology

Integrated Digital Enhanced Network (iDEN) is a mobile telecommunications technology, developed by Motorola, which provides its users the benefits of a trunked radio and a cellular telephone. It was called the first mobile social network by many technology industry analysts. iDEN places more users in a given spectral space, compared to analog cellular and two-way radio systems, by using speech compression and time-division multiple access (TDMA).

== History ==
The iDEN project originally began as MIRS (Motorola Integrated Radio System) in early 1991. The project was a software lab experiment focused on the utilization of discontiguous spectrum for GSM wireless. GSM systems typically require 24 contiguous voice channels, but the original MIRS software platform dynamically selected fragmented channels in the radio frequency (RF) spectrum in such a way that a GSM telecom switch could commence a phone call the same as it would in the contiguous channel scenario.

== Operating frequencies ==
iDEN is designed and licensed to operate on individual frequencies that may not be contiguous. iDEN operates on 25 kHz channels, but only occupies 20 kHz in order to provide interference protection via guard bands. By comparison, TDMA Cellular (Digital AMPS) is licensed in blocks of 30 kHz channels, but each emission occupies 40 kHz, and is capable of serving the same number of subscribers per channel as iDEN. iDEN uses frequency-division duplexing to transmit and receive signals separately, with transmit and receive bands separated by 39 MHz, 45 MHz, or 48 MHz depending on the frequency band being used.

iDEN supports either three or six interconnect users (phone users) per channel, and six dispatch users (push-to-talk users) per channel, using time-division multiple access. The transmit and receive time slots assigned to each user are deliberately offset in time so that a single user never needs to transmit and receive at the same time. This eliminates the need for a duplexer at the mobile end, since time-division duplexing of RF section usage can be performed.

== Hardware ==
The first commercial iDEN handset was Motorola's L3000, which was released in 1994. Lingo, which stands for Link People on the Go, was used as a logo for its earlier handsets. Most modern iDEN handsets use SIM cards, similar to, but incompatible with GSM handsets' SIM cards. Early iDEN models such as the i1000plus stored all subscriber information inside the handset itself, requiring the data to be downloaded and transferred should the subscriber want to switch handsets. Newer handsets using SIM technology make upgrading or changing handsets as easy as swapping the SIM card. Four different sized SIM cards exist, "Endeavor" SIMs are used only with the i2000 without data, "Condor" SIMs are used with the two-digit models (i95cl, for example) using a SIM with less memory than the three-digit models (i730, i860), "Falcon" SIMs are used in the three-digit phones, (i530, i710) and will read the smaller SIM for backward compatibility, but some advanced features such as extra contact information is not supported by the older SIM cards. There is also the "Falcon 128" SIM, which is the same as the original "Falcon", but doubled in memory size, which is used on new 3 digit phones (i560, i930).

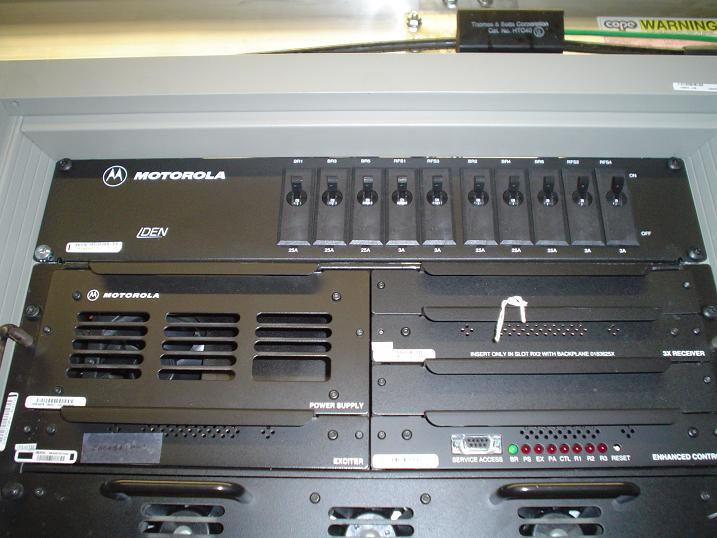
iDEN base radio at a cell site

The interconnect-side of the iDEN network uses GSM signalling for call set-up and mobility management, with the Abis protocol stack modified to support iDEN's additional features. Motorola has named this modified stack 'Mobis'.

Each base site requires precise timing and location information to synchronize data across the network. To obtain and maintain this information each base site uses GPS satellites to receive a precise timing reference.

== WiDEN ==
Wideband Integrated Digital Enhanced Network, or WiDEN, is a software upgrade developed by Motorola and partners for its iDEN enhanced specialized mobile radio (or ESMR) wireless telephony protocol. WiDEN allows compatible subscriber units to communicate across four 25 kHz channels combined, for up to 100 kbit/s of bandwidth. The protocol is generally considered a 2.5G wireless cellular technology.

=== History ===
iDEN, the platform which WiDEN upgrades, and the protocol on which it is based, was originally introduced by Motorola in 1993, and launched as a commercial network by Nextel in the United States in September 1996.

WiDEN was originally anticipated to be a major stepping stone for United States wireless telephone provider Nextel Communications and its affiliate, Nextel Partners. However, beginning with the December 2004 announcement of the Sprint Nextel merger, Nextel's iDEN network was abandoned in favor of Sprint's CDMA network. WiDEN was deactivated on the NEXTEL National Network in October 2005 when rebanding efforts in the 800 MHz band began in an effort to utilize those data channels as a way to handle more cellular phone call traffic on the NEXTEL iDEN network. The original Nextel iDEN network was finally decommissioned by Sprint on June 30, 2013 and the spectrum refarmed for use in the Sprint LTE network.

=== Subscriber Units ===
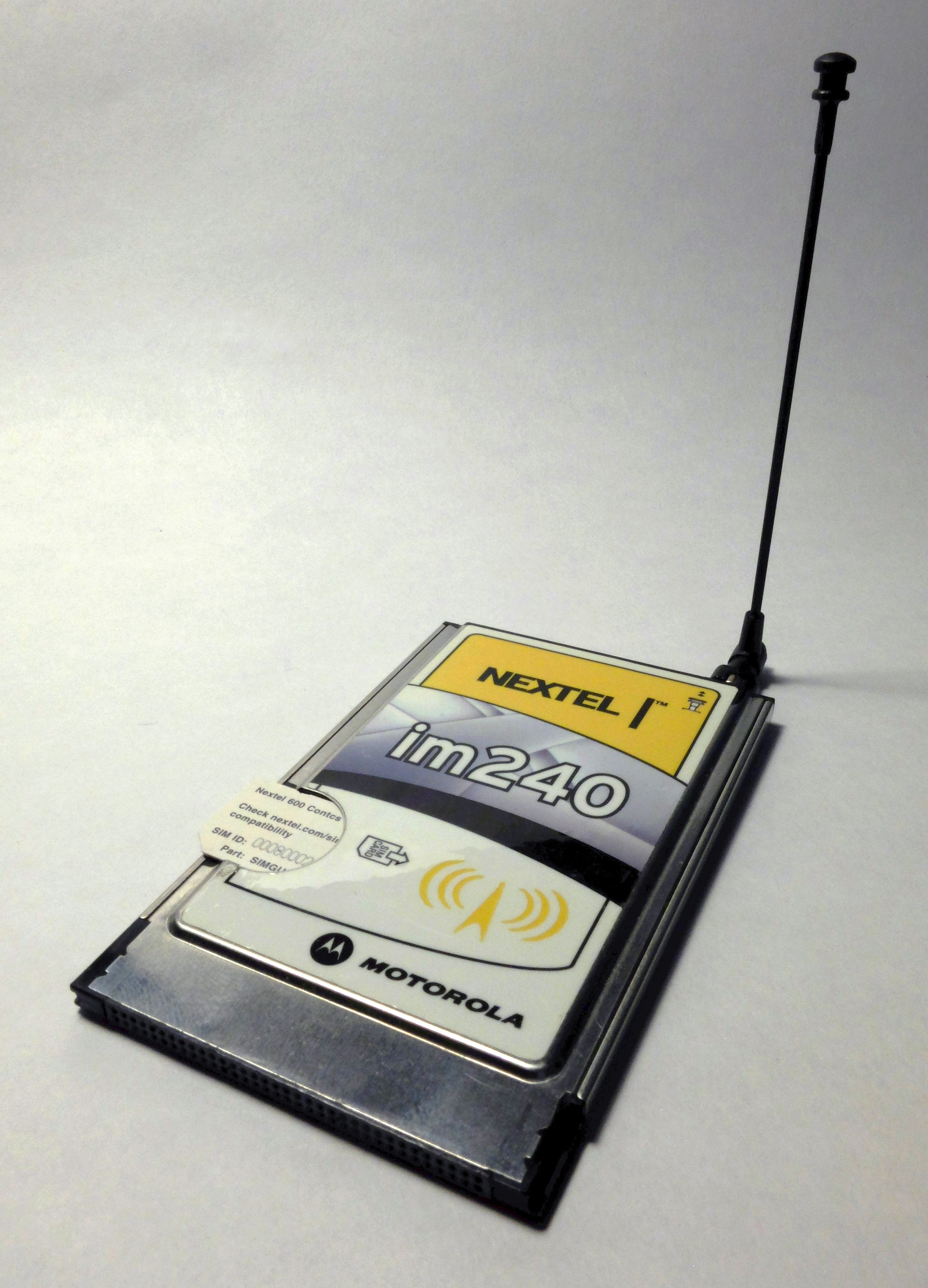
Motorola iM240 WiDEN PC Card

The first WiDEN-compatible device to be released was the Motorola iM240 PC card which allows raw data speeds up to 60 kbit/s. The first WiDEN-compatible telephones are the Motorola i850 and i760, which were released mid-summer 2005. The recent i850/i760 Software Upgrade enables WiDEN on both of these phones. The commercial launch of WiDEN came with the release of the Motorola i870 on 31 October 2005, however, most people never got to experience the WiDEN capability in their handsets. WiDEN is also offered in the i930/i920 Smartphone, however, Sprint shipped these units with WiDEN service disabled. Many in the cellular forum communities have found ways using Motorola's own RSS software to activate it. WiDEN was available in most places on Nextel's National Network. As stated above, it no longer is enabled on the Sprint-controlled towers. Since the Sprint Nextel merger the company determined that because Sprint's CDMA network was already 3G and going to EVDO (broadband speeds), and then EVDO Rev A, it would be redundant to keep upgrading the iDEN data network. WiDEN is considered a 2.5G technology.

== Operators ==
Countries which had iDEN networks included United States of America, Canada, Mexico, Brazil, Colombia, Argentina, Peru, Chile, Puerto Rico, Costa Rica, India, Korea, Jordan, Guam, China, Philippines, Thailand, Israel, Singapore, Saudi Arabia, El Salvador, and Guatemala.

- Sprint Nextel provided iDEN service across the United States until its iDEN network was decommissioned for additional LTE network capacity on 30 June 2013.
- SouthernLINC Wireless provided iDEN service across the United States until its iDEN network was decommissioned for additional LTE network capacity on 1 April 2019.
- Telus provided iDEN service under the Mike brand across most of Canada until its iDEN network was decommissioned on 29 January 2016.
- Nextel Brazil provided iDEN service in Brazil until its iDEN network was decommissioned on 31 March 2018.
- Nextel Argentina also provided iDEN service until decommissioning on 30 June 2019.
- Colombian Avantel deactivated its iDEN service at the end of 2021.
- Nextel Mexico provided iDEN service in Mexico until its iDEN network was decommissioned in 2017. The Mexican Nextel assets were purchased by AT&T in 2015 along with Iusacell the same year to form the nucleus and the revival of AT&T Mexico. AT&T gradually transitioned users from the previous CDMA and iDEN networks to AWS 3G and 4G LTE networks beginning in 2017.

Network operator	Country	Frequency (MHz)	Service branding
Con Edison	United States	800	Private network

== Capitalization and pronunciation ==
Motorola originally referred to the platform as wiDEN, choosing to capitalize only the letters representing "Digital Enhanced Network," as it had with iDEN. However, subsequent promotion from Motorola and Nextel has indicated that the preferred capitalization is WiDEN.

The term has been pronounced, commonly, as a close combination to the words "why" and "den", or simply as the word "widen". The former is closer to the original pronunciation of iDEN, as "eye" and "den".

== See also ==
- List of device bandwidths
- Motorola iDEN phone models
- Push to Talk over Cellular
- Radio Service Software
- Trunked radio system
