= 2025 12 Hours of Mugello =

The layout of Mugello Circuit, where the race was held

The 2025 12 Hours of Mugello (known as the 2025 Michelin 12 Hours of Mugello for sponsorship reasons) was a pair of endurance sportscar races held on the 22 and 23 March 2025, in Tuscany, Italy, as the first of five rounds of the 2025 24H Series. It was the eleventh running of the event, and the tenth running of the event as part of the 24H Series. Part 1 of the race was held on 22 March over a seven-hour distance. Part 2 on 23 March saw the race restarted where the previous race finished and ran for a further five-hours to make up a 12 hour total time. Part 1 was won by the Ebimotors Porsche team of Fabrizio Broggi, Sabino de Castro and Sergiu Nicolae. Best performer in Part 2 was the Era Motorsport Ferrari of Ryan Dalziel, Jake Hill, Dwight Merriman and Kyle Tilley. The Ebimotors Porsche team were the overall winners ahead of the Heart of Racing Mercedes-AMG team of Hannah Grisham, Ian James and Gray Newell. Third was the Era Motorsport Ferrari.

== Background ==
The event was announced on 24 September 2024 along with the rest of the 2025 24H Series calendar.

== Entry list ==
The entry list was announced on 14 March 2025, and features 32 entries over 4 classes – 15 in GT3, 3 in GTX, 11 in 992, and 3 in GT4.

No.	Entrant	Car	Class	Driver 1	Driver 2	Driver 3	Driver 4
GT3 (15 entries)
8	(Switzerland) CCC Kessel Racing	Ferrari 296 GT3	PA	(Italy) Alessandro Cutrera	(Italy) Leonardo-Maria del Vecchio	(Italy) Marco Frezza	(Italy) David Fumanelli
11	(Switzerland) Hofor Racing	Mercedes-AMG GT3 Evo	Am	(Switzerland) Michael Kroll	(Germany) Maximilian Partl	(Germany) Alexander Prinz	(Switzerland) Chantal Prinz
23	(Italy) Pellin Racing	Ferrari 488 GT3 Evo 2020	P	(United States) Thor Haugen	(Italy) Paolo Ruberti		
27	(United States) Heart of Racing by SPS	Mercedes-AMG GT3 Evo	Am	(United States) Hannah Grisham	(United Kingdom) Ian James	(United States) Gray Newell	
29	(Italy) Pellin Racing	Ferrari 296 GT3	P	(United States) Lisa Clark	(Canada) Kyle Marcelli		
44	(Slovakia) ARC Bratislava	Lamborghini Huracán GT3 Evo	Am	(Slovakia) Miro Konôpka	(China) Liang Jiatong	(Slovakia) Zdeno Mikulasko	(Austria) Gerhard Tweraser
56	(Czech Republic) Scuderia Praha	Ferrari 296 GT3	PA	(Czech Republic) Josef Král	(Czech Republic) Matúš Výboh	(Czech Republic) Miroslav Výboh	
58	(Italy) MP Racing	Mercedes-AMG GT3 Evo	Am	(Italy) Corinna Gostner	(Italy) David Gostner	(Italy) Manuela Gostner	(Italy) Thomas Gostner
69	(United Kingdom) Continental Racing by Simpson Motorsport	Audi R8 LMS Evo II	Am	David Pogosyan	(Kyrgyzstan) Andrey Solukovtsev	(Cyprus) Vasily Vladykin	
71	(Lithuania) Juta Racing	Audi R8 LMS Evo II	Am	(Lithuania) Arunas Geciauskas	(Italy) Nicola Michelon	(Switzerland) Tim Müller	
73	(Germany) Proton Huber Competition	Porsche 911 GT3 R (992)	PA	(Austria) Klaus Bachler	(Germany) Jörg Dreisow	(Germany) Manuel Lauck	
81	(United States) Era Motorsport	Ferrari 296 GT3	PA	(United Kingdom) Jake Hill	(United States) Dwight Merriman	(United States) Kyle Tilley	(United States) Ryan Dalziel
90	(Spain) E2P Racing	Aston Martin Vantage AMR GT3 Evo	Am	(Spain) Pablo Burguera	(Spain) Olievr Campos	(Spain) Antonio Sainero	
93	(Belgium) Red Ant Racing	Mercedes-AMG GT3 Evo	P	(Belgium) Kobe de Breucker	(Germany) Kenneth Heyer	(Belgium) Ayrton Redant	(Belgium) Yannick Redant
95	(Italy) Manamauri Energy by Ebimotors	Porsche 911 GT3 R (992)	PA	(Italy) Fabrizio Broggi	(Italy) Sabino de Castro	(Belgium) Sergiu Nicolae	
GTX (3 entries)
111	(Australia) 111 Racing	IRC GT		(Australia) Darren Currie	(Australia) Grant Donaldson		
701	(France) Vortex V8	Vortex 2.0		(France) Lionel Amrouche	(France) Philippe Bonnel	(France) Cyril Calmon	
702	(France) Vortex V8	Vortex 2.0		(France) Arnaud Gomez	(France) Olivier Gomez		
992 (11 entries)
888	(France) SebLajoux Racing	Porsche 992 GT3 Cup	Am	(Belgium) Nigel Bailly	(France) Sebastien Lajoux	(Netherlands) Paul Meijer	(France) Stephane Perrin
901	(India) Ajith Kumar Racing by BKR	Porsche 992 GT3 Cup	Am	(Belgium) Mathieu Detry	(Belgium) Fabian Duffieux	(India) Ajith Kumar	
902	(Denmark) Holmgaard Motorsport	Porsche 992 GT3 Cup	P	(Denmark) Jonas Holmgaard	(Denmark) Magnus Holmgaard	(Denmark) Martin Mortensen	(Denmark) Patrick Rasmussen
907	(Germany) RPM Racing	Porsche 992 GT3 Cup	Am	(Germany) Philip Hamprecht	(Sweden) Niclas Jönsson	(United States) Tracy Krohn	
909	(Netherlands) Red Camel-Jordans.nl	Porsche 992 GT3 Cup	P	(Netherlands) Luc Breukers	(Netherlands) Rik Breukers	(Switzerland) Fabian Denz	
921	(Belgium) Mühlner Motorsport	Porsche 992 GT3 Cup	P	(Estonia) Martin Rump	(Latvia) Valters Zviedris	(Germany) Julian Hanses	
928	(Germany) HRT Performance	Porsche 992 GT3 Cup	P	Alexey Denisov	Sergey Titarenko	Victor Titarenko	
949	(Spain) Escuderia Faraon	Porsche 992 GT3 Cup	Am	(Spain) Pablo Bras Silvero	(Spain) Pedro Miguel Lourinho Bras	(Spain) Fernando Gonzalez Gonzalez	
965	(Netherlands) MDM Motorsport	Porsche 992 GT3 Cup	P	(Netherlands) Tom Coronel	(Netherlands) Hjelte Hoffner	(Netherlands) Jan Jaap van Roon	
973	(Italy) Ebimotors	Porsche 992 GT3 Cup	Am	(Italy) Paolo Gnemmi	(Italy) Riccardo Pera	(Italy) Davide Roda	(Italy) Paolo Venerosi
992	(Lithuania) Porsche Baltic	Porsche 992 GT3 Cup	Am	(Lithuania) Robertas Kupcikas	(Lithuania) Audrius Piktys	(Lithuania) Tautvydas Rudokas	
GT4 (3 entries)
410	(Germany) CCS Racing	Porsche 718 Cayman GT4 RS Clubsport		(Germany) Jim Gebhardt	(Germany) Nikolas Gebhardt		
421	(United Kingdom) Venture Engineering	Mercedes-AMG GT4		(United Kingdom) Matthew George	(United Kingdom) Matthew Higgins	(United Kingdom) Christopher Jones	(United Kingdom) Neville Jones
426	(Italy) Lotus PB Racing	Lotus Emira GT4		(Italy) Stefano d'Aste	(Italy) Massimo Abbati	(Italy) Alberto Naska	(Italy) Massimiliano Schiavone

GT3 entries
Icon	Class
P	GT3-Pro
PA	GT3-Pro/Am
Am	GT3-Am
992 entries
Icon	Class
P	992-Pro
Am	992-Am

== Schedule ==
Date	Time (local: CET)	Event	Duration
Friday, 21 March	11:30 - 13:00	Free practice	90 minutes
Friday, 21 March	15:00 - 15:55	Qualifying - TCE, GT4 & GTX	3x15 minutes
Friday, 21 March	16:00 - 16:55	Qualifying - 992	3x15 minutes
Friday, 21 March	17:05 - 18:00	Qualifying - GT3	3x15 minutes
Saturday, 22 March	11:00 - 18:00	Race - Part 1	7 hours
Sunday, 23 March	09:30 - 14:30	Race - Part 2	5 hours

== Free Practice ==
Class	No.	Entrant	Driver	Time
GT3	73	(Germany) Proton Huber Competition	(Germany) Manuel Lauck	1:46.787
GTX	702	(France) Vortex V8	(France) Olivier Gomez	1:50.615
992	973	(Italy) Ebimotors	(Italy) Riccardo Pera	1:50.776
GT4	410	(Germany) CCS Racing	(Germany) Nikolas Gebhardt	1:57.901

- Note: Only the fastest car in each class is shown.

== Qualifying ==
Qualifying was split into three parts for all groups. The average of the best times per qualifying session determined the starting order. CCC Kessel Racing secured pole position with a combined average time of 1:47.092.

=== Qualifying results ===
Pole position winners in each class are marked in bold.

==== TCE, GT4 & GTX ====
Pos.	Class	No.	Team	Avg
1	**GTX**	**702**	**(France) Vortex V8**	**1:49.598**
2	GTX	111	(Australia) 111 Racing	1:52.142
3	GTX	701	(France) Vortex V8	1:54.876
4	**GT4**	**410**	**(Germany) CCS Racing**	**1:57.905**
5	GT4	426	(Italy) Lotus PB Racing	1:58.070
6	GT4	421	(United Kingdom) Venture Engineering	2:02.385

==== 992 ====
Pos.	Class	No.	Team	Avg
1	**992 Pro**	**909**	**(Netherlands) Red Camel-Jordans.nl**	**1:51.171**
2	992 Pro	921	(Belgium) Mühlner Motorsport	1:51.273
3	**992 Am**	**888**	**(France) SebLajoux Racing**	**1:52.444**
4	992 Pro	965	(Netherlands) MDM Motorsport	1:52.456
5	992 Am	907	(Germany) RPM Racing	1:52.988
6	992 Am	973	(Italy) Ebimotors	1:53.437
7	992 Am	901	(India) Ajith Kumar Racing by BKR	1:54.217
8	992 Am	928	(Germany) HRT Performance	1:54.568
9	992 Am	949	(Spain) Escuderia Faraon	1:54.759
10	992 Am	992	(Lithuania) Porsche Baltic	1:55.493
–	992 Pro	902	(Denmark) Holmgaard Motorsport	No time

==== GT3 ====
Pos.	Class	No.	Team	Avg
1	**GT3 Pro/Am**	**8**	**(Switzerland) CCC Kessel Racing**	**1:47.092**
2	**GT3 Am**	**27**	**(United States) Heart of Racing by SPS**	**1:47.661**
3	**GT3 Pro**	**93**	**(Belgium) Red Ant Racing**	**1:47.783**
4	GT3 Pro/Am	81	(United States) Era Motorsport	1:47.951
5	GT3 Pro/Am	73	(Germany) Proton Huber Competition	1:48.246
6	GT3 Am	69	(United Arab Emirates) Continental Racing by Simpson Motorsport	1:48.365
7	GT3 Am	44	(Slovakia) ARC Bratislava	1:48.405
8	GT3 Am	71	(Lithuania) Juta Racing	1:48.580
9	GT3 Pro/Am	95	(United Arab Emirates) Manamauri Energy by Ebimotors	1:48.795
10	GT3 Pro	29	(Italy) Pellin Racing	1:49.417
11	GT3 Am	90	(Spain) E2P Racing	1:49.500
12	GT3 Am	11	(Switzerland) Hofor Racing	1:49.608
13	GT3 Pro/Am	56	(Czech Republic) Scuderia Praha	1:49.689
14	GT3 Pro	23	(Italy) Pellin Racing	1:49.980
15	GT3 Am	58	(Italy) MP Racing	1:50.375

== Race ==
The race was won overall by the No. 95 Manamauri Energy by Ebimotors Porsche 911 GT3 R (992) followed by the No. 27 Heart of Racing by SPS Mercedes-AMG GT3 Evo in second and the No. 81 Era Motorsport Ferrari 296 GT3 in third. The No. 8 CCC Kessel Racing Ferrari 296 GT3 crossed the finish line first but received a post race four-lap penalty due to a drive time infraction.

=== Race results ===
==== Part 1 ====
Class winners are in bold.

Pos	Class	No.	Team	Drivers	Car	Laps	Time/Retired
Pos	Class	No.	Team	Drivers	Engine	Laps	Time/Retired
1	**GT3 Pro/Am**	**95**	**(United Arab Emirates) Manamauri Energy by Ebimotors**	**(Italy) Fabrizio Broggi** **(Italy) Sabino de Castro** **(Belgium) Sergiu Nicolae**	**Porsche 911 GT3 R (992)**	**161**	**7:00:18.622**
1	**GT3 Pro/Am**	**95**	**(United Arab Emirates) Manamauri Energy by Ebimotors**	**(Italy) Fabrizio Broggi** **(Italy) Sabino de Castro** **(Belgium) Sergiu Nicolae**	**Porsche M97/80 4.2 L Flat-6**	**161**	**7:00:18.622**
2	GT3 Pro/Am	8	(Switzerland) CCC Kessel Racing	(Italy) Alessandro Cutrera (Italy) Leonardo-Maria del Vecchio (Italy) Marco Frezza (Italy) David Fumanelli	Ferrari 296 GT3	161	+2:29.010
2	GT3 Pro/Am	8	(Switzerland) CCC Kessel Racing	(Italy) Alessandro Cutrera (Italy) Leonardo-Maria del Vecchio (Italy) Marco Frezza (Italy) David Fumanelli	Ferrari F163CE 3.0 L Turbo V6	161	+2:29.010
3	**GT3 Am**	**27**	**(United States) Heart of Racing by SPS**	**(United States) Hannah Grisham** **(United Kingdom) Ian James** **(United States) Gray Newell**	**Mercedes-AMG GT3 Evo**	**161**	**+3:59.058**
3	**GT3 Am**	**27**	**(United States) Heart of Racing by SPS**	**(United States) Hannah Grisham** **(United Kingdom) Ian James** **(United States) Gray Newell**	**Mercedes-AMG M159 6.2 L V8**	**161**	**+3:59.058**
4	GT3 Am	69	(United Arab Emirates) Continental Racing by Simpson Motorsport	David Pogosyan (Kyrgyzstan) Andrey Solukovtsev (Cyprus) Vasily Vladykin	Audi R8 LMS Evo II	160	+1 Lap
4	GT3 Am	69	(United Arab Emirates) Continental Racing by Simpson Motorsport	David Pogosyan (Kyrgyzstan) Andrey Solukovtsev (Cyprus) Vasily Vladykin	Audi DAR 5.2 L V10	160	+1 Lap
5	GT3 Pro/Am	81	(United States) Era Motorsport	(United Kingdom) Jake Hill (United States) Dwight Merriman (United States) Kyle Tilley (United States) Ryan Dalziel	Ferrari 296 GT3	159	+2 Laps
5	GT3 Pro/Am	81	(United States) Era Motorsport	(United Kingdom) Jake Hill (United States) Dwight Merriman (United States) Kyle Tilley (United States) Ryan Dalziel	Ferrari F163CE 3.0 L Turbo V6	159	+2 Laps
6	**992 Pro**	**921**	**(Belgium) Mühlner Motorsport**	**(Estonia) Martin Rump** **(Latvia) Valters Zviedris** **(Germany) Julian Hanses**	**Porsche 992 GT3 Cup**	**158**	**+3 Laps**
6	**992 Pro**	**921**	**(Belgium) Mühlner Motorsport**	**(Estonia) Martin Rump** **(Latvia) Valters Zviedris** **(Germany) Julian Hanses**	**Porsche 4.0 L Flat-6**	**158**	**+3 Laps**
7	GT3 Am	11	(Switzerland) Hofor Racing	(Switzerland) Michael Kroll (Germany) Maximilian Partl (Germany) Alexander Prinz (Switzerland) Chantal Prinz	Mercedes-AMG GT3 Evo	158	+3 Laps
7	GT3 Am	11	(Switzerland) Hofor Racing	(Switzerland) Michael Kroll (Germany) Maximilian Partl (Germany) Alexander Prinz (Switzerland) Chantal Prinz	Mercedes-AMG M159 6.2 L V8	158	+3 Laps
8	GT3 Am	71	(Lithuania) Juta Racing	(Lithuania) Arunas Geciauskas (Italy) Nicola Michelon (Switzerland) Tim Müller	Audi R8 LMS Evo II	158	+3 Laps
8	GT3 Am	71	(Lithuania) Juta Racing	(Lithuania) Arunas Geciauskas (Italy) Nicola Michelon (Switzerland) Tim Müller	Audi DAR 5.2 L V10	158	+3 Laps
9	**GT3 Pro**	**93**	**(Belgium) Red Ant Racing**	**(Belgium) Kobe de Breucker** **(Germany) Kenneth Heyer** **(Belgium) Ayrton Redant** **(Belgium) Yannick Redant**	**Mercedes-AMG GT3 Evo**	**158**	**+3 Laps**
9	**GT3 Pro**	**93**	**(Belgium) Red Ant Racing**	**(Belgium) Kobe de Breucker** **(Germany) Kenneth Heyer** **(Belgium) Ayrton Redant** **(Belgium) Yannick Redant**	**Mercedes-AMG M159 6.2 L V8**	**158**	**+3 Laps**
10	992 Pro	909	(Netherlands) Red Camel-Jordans.nl	(Netherlands) Luc Breukers (Netherlands) Rik Breukers (Switzerland) Fabian Denz	Porsche 992 GT3 Cup	157	+4 Laps
10	992 Pro	909	(Netherlands) Red Camel-Jordans.nl	(Netherlands) Luc Breukers (Netherlands) Rik Breukers (Switzerland) Fabian Denz	Porsche 4.0 L Flat-6	157	+4 Laps
11	GT3 Am	44	(Slovakia) ARC Bratislava	(Slovakia) Miro Konôpka (China) Liang Jiatong (Slovakia) Zdeno Mikulasko (Austria) Gerhard Tweraser	Lamborghini Huracán GT3 Evo	157	+4 Laps
11	GT3 Am	44	(Slovakia) ARC Bratislava	(Slovakia) Miro Konôpka (China) Liang Jiatong (Slovakia) Zdeno Mikulasko (Austria) Gerhard Tweraser	Lamborghini DGF 5.2 L V10	157	+4 Laps
12	GT3 Pro/Am	56	(Czech Republic) Scuderia Praha	(Czech Republic) Josef Král (Czech Republic) Matúš Výboh (Czech Republic) Miroslav Výboh	Ferrari 296 GT3	156	+5 Laps
12	GT3 Pro/Am	56	(Czech Republic) Scuderia Praha	(Czech Republic) Josef Král (Czech Republic) Matúš Výboh (Czech Republic) Miroslav Výboh	Ferrari F163CE 3.0 L Turbo V6	156	+5 Laps
13	GT3 Pro	29	(Italy) Pellin Racing	(United States) Lisa Clark (Canada) Kyle Marcelli	Ferrari 296 GT3	155	+6 Laps
13	GT3 Pro	29	(Italy) Pellin Racing	(United States) Lisa Clark (Canada) Kyle Marcelli	Ferrari F163CE 3.0 L Turbo V6	155	+6 Laps
14	**GTX**	**702**	**(France) Vortex V8**	**(France) Arnaud Gomez** **(France) Olivier Gomez**	**Vortex 2.0**	**155**	**+6 Laps**
14	**GTX**	**702**	**(France) Vortex V8**	**(France) Arnaud Gomez** **(France) Olivier Gomez**	**Chevrolet LS3 6.2 L V8**	**155**	**+6 Laps**
15	**992 Am**	**888**	**(France) SebLajoux Racing**	**(Belgium) Nigel Bailly** **(France) Sebastien Lajoux** **(Netherlands) Paul Meijer** **(France) Stephane Perrin**	**Porsche 992 GT3 Cup**	**154**	**+7 Laps**
15	**992 Am**	**888**	**(France) SebLajoux Racing**	**(Belgium) Nigel Bailly** **(France) Sebastien Lajoux** **(Netherlands) Paul Meijer** **(France) Stephane Perrin**	**Porsche 4.0 L Flat-6**	**154**	**+7 Laps**
16	GT3 Am	58	(Italy) MP Racing	(Italy) Corinna Gostner (Italy) David Gostner (Italy) Manuela Gostner (Italy) Thomas Gostner	Mercedes-AMG GT3 Evo	154	+7 Laps
16	GT3 Am	58	(Italy) MP Racing	(Italy) Corinna Gostner (Italy) David Gostner (Italy) Manuela Gostner (Italy) Thomas Gostner	Mercedes-AMG M159 6.2 L V8	154	+7 Laps
17	992 Am	907	(Germany) RPM Racing	(Germany) Philip Hamprecht (Sweden) Niclas Jönsson (United States) Tracy Krohn	Porsche 992 GT3 Cup	153	+8 Laps
17	992 Am	907	(Germany) RPM Racing	(Germany) Philip Hamprecht (Sweden) Niclas Jönsson (United States) Tracy Krohn	Porsche 4.0 L Flat-6	153	+8 Laps
18	992 Pro	902	(Denmark) Holmgaard Motorsport	(Denmark) Jonas Holmgaard (Denmark) Magnus Holmgaard (Denmark) Martin Mortensen (Denmark) Patrick Rasmussen	Porsche 992 GT3 Cup	153	+8 Laps
18	992 Pro	902	(Denmark) Holmgaard Motorsport	(Denmark) Jonas Holmgaard (Denmark) Magnus Holmgaard (Denmark) Martin Mortensen (Denmark) Patrick Rasmussen	Porsche 4.0 L Flat-6	153	+8 Laps
19	992 Am	901	(India) Ajith Kumar Racing by BKR	(Belgium) Mathieu Detry (Belgium) Fabian Duffieux (India) Ajith Kumar	Porsche 992 GT3 Cup	153	+8 Laps
19	992 Am	901	(India) Ajith Kumar Racing by BKR	(Belgium) Mathieu Detry (Belgium) Fabian Duffieux (India) Ajith Kumar	Porsche 4.0 L Flat-6	153	+8 Laps
20	992 Am	973	(Italy) Ebimotors	(Italy) Paolo Gnemmi (Italy) Riccardo Pera (Italy) Davide Roda (Italy) Paolo Venerosi	Porsche 992 GT3 Cup	153	+8 Laps
20	992 Am	973	(Italy) Ebimotors	(Italy) Paolo Gnemmi (Italy) Riccardo Pera (Italy) Davide Roda (Italy) Paolo Venerosi	Porsche 4.0 L Flat-6	153	+8 Laps
21	992 Am	949	(Spain) Escuderia Faraon	(Spain) Pablo Bras Silvero (Spain) Pedro Miguel Lourinho Bras (Spain) Fernando Gonzalez Gonzalez	Porsche 992 GT3 Cup	151	+10 Laps
21	992 Am	949	(Spain) Escuderia Faraon	(Spain) Pablo Bras Silvero (Spain) Pedro Miguel Lourinho Bras (Spain) Fernando Gonzalez Gonzalez	Porsche 4.0 L Flat-6	151	+10 Laps
22	992 Am	992	(Lithuania) Porsche Baltic	(Lithuania) Robertas Kupcikas (Lithuania) Audrius Piktys (Lithuania) Tautvydas Rudokas	Porsche 992 GT3 Cup	151	+10 Laps
22	992 Am	992	(Lithuania) Porsche Baltic	(Lithuania) Robertas Kupcikas (Lithuania) Audrius Piktys (Lithuania) Tautvydas Rudokas	Porsche 4.0 L Flat-6	151	+10 Laps
23	**GT4**	**421**	**(United Kingdom) Venture Engineering**	**(United Kingdom) Matthew George** **(United Kingdom) Matthew Higgins** **(United Kingdom) Christopher Jones** **(United Kingdom) Neville Jones**	**Mercedes-AMG GT4**	**151**	**+10 Laps**
23	**GT4**	**421**	**(United Kingdom) Venture Engineering**	**(United Kingdom) Matthew George** **(United Kingdom) Matthew Higgins** **(United Kingdom) Christopher Jones** **(United Kingdom) Neville Jones**	**Mercedes-AMG M178 4.0 L V8**	**151**	**+10 Laps**
24	GT4	410	(Germany) CCS Racing	(Germany) Jim Gebhardt (Germany) Nikolas Gebhardt	Porsche 718 Cayman GT4 RS Clubsport	149	+12 Laps
24	GT4	410	(Germany) CCS Racing	(Germany) Jim Gebhardt (Germany) Nikolas Gebhardt	Porsche MDG 4.0 L Flat-6	149	+12 Laps
25	992 Pro	965	(Netherlands) MDM Motorsport	(Netherlands) Tom Coronel (Netherlands) Hjelte Hoffner (Netherlands) Jan Jaap van Roon	Porsche 992 GT3 Cup	144	+17 Laps
25	992 Pro	965	(Netherlands) MDM Motorsport	(Netherlands) Tom Coronel (Netherlands) Hjelte Hoffner (Netherlands) Jan Jaap van Roon	Porsche 4.0 L Flat-6	144	+17 Laps
26	GTX	701	(France) Vortex V8	(France) Lionel Amrouche (France) Philippe Bonnel (France) Cyril Calmon	Vortex 2.0	144	+17 Laps
26	GTX	701	(France) Vortex V8	(France) Lionel Amrouche (France) Philippe Bonnel (France) Cyril Calmon	Chevrolet LS3 6.2 L V8	144	+17 Laps
27	992 Am	928	(Germany) HRT Performance	Alexey Denisov; Sergey Titarenko; Victor Titarenko	Porsche 992 GT3 Cup	138	+23 Laps
27	992 Am	928	(Germany) HRT Performance	Alexey Denisov; Sergey Titarenko; Victor Titarenko	Porsche 4.0 L Flat-6	138	+23 Laps
28	GT4	426	(Italy) Lotus PB Racing	(Italy) Stefano d'Aste (Italy) Massimo Abbati (Italy) Alberto Naska (Italy) Massimiliano Schiavone	Lotus Emira GT4	128	+33 Laps
28	GT4	426	(Italy) Lotus PB Racing	(Italy) Stefano d'Aste (Italy) Massimo Abbati (Italy) Alberto Naska (Italy) Massimiliano Schiavone	Lotus 2GR-FE 3.6 L V6	128	+33 Laps
29	GT3 Pro/Am	73	(Germany) Proton Huber Competition	(Austria) Klaus Bachler (Germany) Jörg Dreisow (Germany) Manuel Lauck	Porsche 911 GT3 R (992)	128	+33 Laps
29	GT3 Pro/Am	73	(Germany) Proton Huber Competition	(Austria) Klaus Bachler (Germany) Jörg Dreisow (Germany) Manuel Lauck	Porsche M97/80 4.2 L Flat-6	128	+33 Laps
30	GTX	111	(Australia) 111 Racing	(Australia) Darren Currie (Australia) Grant Donaldson	IRC GT	120	+41 Laps
30	GTX	111	(Australia) 111 Racing	(Australia) Darren Currie (Australia) Grant Donaldson	GM LS3 6.2 L V8	120	+41 Laps
31 DNF	GT3 Am	90	(Spain) E2P Racing	(Spain) Pablo Burguera (Spain) Olievr Campos (Spain) Antonio Sainero	Aston Martin Vantage AMR GT3 Evo	58	+103 Laps
31 DNF	GT3 Am	90	(Spain) E2P Racing	(Spain) Pablo Burguera (Spain) Olievr Campos (Spain) Antonio Sainero	Aston Martin M177 4.0 L Twin-Turbo V8	58	+103 Laps
DNS	GT3 Pro	23	(Italy) Pellin Racing	(United States) Thor Haugen (Italy) Paolo Ruberti	Ferrari 488 GT3 Evo 2020	0	Did not start
DNS	GT3 Pro	23	(Italy) Pellin Racing	(United States) Thor Haugen (Italy) Paolo Ruberti	Ferrari F154CB 3.9 L Turbo V8	0	Did not start

==== Part 2 ====
Class winners are in bold.

Pos	Class	No.	Team	Drivers	Car	Laps	Time/Retired
Pos	Class	No.	Team	Drivers	Engine	Laps	Time/Retired
1	**GT3 Pro/Am**	**95**	**(United Arab Emirates) Manamauri Energy by Ebimotors**	**(Italy) Fabrizio Broggi** **(Italy) Sabino de Castro** **(Belgium) Sergiu Nicolae**	**Porsche 911 GT3 R (992)**	**305**	**5:02:26.727**
1	**GT3 Pro/Am**	**95**	**(United Arab Emirates) Manamauri Energy by Ebimotors**	**(Italy) Fabrizio Broggi** **(Italy) Sabino de Castro** **(Belgium) Sergiu Nicolae**	**Porsche M97/80 4.2 L Flat-6**	**305**	**5:02:26.727**
2	**GT3 Am**	**27**	**(United States) Heart of Racing by SPS**	**(United States) Hannah Grisham** **(United Kingdom) Ian James** **(United States) Gray Newell**	**Mercedes-AMG GT3 Evo**	**304**	**+1 Lap**
2	**GT3 Am**	**27**	**(United States) Heart of Racing by SPS**	**(United States) Hannah Grisham** **(United Kingdom) Ian James** **(United States) Gray Newell**	**Mercedes-AMG M159 6.2 L V8**	**304**	**+1 Lap**
3	GT3 Pro/Am	81	(United States) Era Motorsport	(United Kingdom) Jake Hill (United States) Dwight Merriman (United States) Kyle Tilley (United States) Ryan Dalziel	Ferrari 296 GT3	304	+1 Lap
3	GT3 Pro/Am	81	(United States) Era Motorsport	(United Kingdom) Jake Hill (United States) Dwight Merriman (United States) Kyle Tilley (United States) Ryan Dalziel	Ferrari F163CE 3.0 L Turbo V6	304	+1 Lap
4	GT3 Pro/Am	8	(Switzerland) CCC Kessel Racing	(Italy) Alessandro Cutrera (Italy) Leonardo-Maria del Vecchio (Italy) Marco Frezza (Italy) David Fumanelli	Ferrari 296 GT3	302	+3 Laps
4	GT3 Pro/Am	8	(Switzerland) CCC Kessel Racing	(Italy) Alessandro Cutrera (Italy) Leonardo-Maria del Vecchio (Italy) Marco Frezza (Italy) David Fumanelli	Ferrari F163CE 3.0 L Turbo V6	302	+3 Laps
5	**GT3 Pro**	**93**	**(Belgium) Red Ant Racing**	**(Belgium) Kobe de Breucker** **(Germany) Kenneth Heyer** **(Belgium) Ayrton Redant** **(Belgium) Yannick Redant**	**Mercedes-AMG GT3 Evo**	**302**	**+3 Laps**
5	**GT3 Pro**	**93**	**(Belgium) Red Ant Racing**	**(Belgium) Kobe de Breucker** **(Germany) Kenneth Heyer** **(Belgium) Ayrton Redant** **(Belgium) Yannick Redant**	**Mercedes-AMG M159 6.2 L V8**	**302**	**+3 Laps**
6	GT3 Am	44	(Slovakia) ARC Bratislava	(Slovakia) Miro Konôpka (China) Liang Jiatong (Slovakia) Zdeno Mikulasko (Austria) Gerhard Tweraser	Lamborghini Huracán GT3 Evo	301	+4 Laps
6	GT3 Am	44	(Slovakia) ARC Bratislava	(Slovakia) Miro Konôpka (China) Liang Jiatong (Slovakia) Zdeno Mikulasko (Austria) Gerhard Tweraser	Lamborghini DGF 5.2 L V10	301	+4 Laps
7	GT3 Am	69	(United Arab Emirates) Continental Racing by Simpson Motorsport	David Pogosyan (Kyrgyzstan) Andrey Solukovtsev (Cyprus) Vasily Vladykin	Audi R8 LMS Evo II	299	+6 Laps
7	GT3 Am	69	(United Arab Emirates) Continental Racing by Simpson Motorsport	David Pogosyan (Kyrgyzstan) Andrey Solukovtsev (Cyprus) Vasily Vladykin	Audi DAR 5.2 L V10	299	+6 Laps
8	**992 Pro**	**909**	**(Netherlands) Red Camel-Jordans.nl**	**(Netherlands) Luc Breukers** **(Netherlands) Rik Breukers** **(Switzerland) Fabian Denz**	**Porsche 992 GT3 Cup**	**299**	**+6 Laps**
8	**992 Pro**	**909**	**(Netherlands) Red Camel-Jordans.nl**	**(Netherlands) Luc Breukers** **(Netherlands) Rik Breukers** **(Switzerland) Fabian Denz**	**Porsche 4.0 L Flat-6**	**299**	**+6 Laps**
9	GT3 Am	71	(Lithuania) Juta Racing	(Lithuania) Arunas Geciauskas (Italy) Nicola Michelon (Switzerland) Tim Müller	Audi R8 LMS Evo II	298	+7 Laps
9	GT3 Am	71	(Lithuania) Juta Racing	(Lithuania) Arunas Geciauskas (Italy) Nicola Michelon (Switzerland) Tim Müller	Audi DAR 5.2 L V10	298	+7 Laps
10	GT3 Pro/Am	56	(Czech Republic) Scuderia Praha	(Czech Republic) Josef Král (Czech Republic) Matúš Výboh (Czech Republic) Miroslav Výboh	Ferrari 296 GT3	297	+8 Laps
10	GT3 Pro/Am	56	(Czech Republic) Scuderia Praha	(Czech Republic) Josef Král (Czech Republic) Matúš Výboh (Czech Republic) Miroslav Výboh	Ferrari F163CE 3.0 L Turbo V6	297	+8 Laps
11	**GTX**	**702**	**(France) Vortex V8**	**(France) Arnaud Gomez** **(France) Olivier Gomez**	**Vortex 2.0**	**295**	**+10 Laps**
11	**GTX**	**702**	**(France) Vortex V8**	**(France) Arnaud Gomez** **(France) Olivier Gomez**	**Chevrolet LS3 6.2 L V8**	**295**	**+10 Laps**
12	GT3 Am	58	(Italy) MP Racing	(Italy) Corinna Gostner (Italy) David Gostner (Italy) Manuela Gostner (Italy) Thomas Gostner	Mercedes-AMG GT3 Evo	294	+11 Laps
12	GT3 Am	58	(Italy) MP Racing	(Italy) Corinna Gostner (Italy) David Gostner (Italy) Manuela Gostner (Italy) Thomas Gostner	Mercedes-AMG M159 6.2 L V8	294	+11 Laps
13	**992 Am**	**907**	**(Germany) RPM Racing**	**(Germany) Philip Hamprecht** **(Sweden) Niclas Jönsson** **(United States) Tracy Krohn**	**Porsche 992 GT3 Cup**	**294**	**+11 Laps**
13	**992 Am**	**907**	**(Germany) RPM Racing**	**(Germany) Philip Hamprecht** **(Sweden) Niclas Jönsson** **(United States) Tracy Krohn**	**Porsche 4.0 L Flat-6**	**294**	**+11 Laps**
14	992 Am	888	(France) SebLajoux Racing	(Belgium) Nigel Bailly (France) Sebastien Lajoux (Netherlands) Paul Meijer (France) Stephane Perrin	Porsche 992 GT3 Cup	293	+12 Laps
14	992 Am	888	(France) SebLajoux Racing	(Belgium) Nigel Bailly (France) Sebastien Lajoux (Netherlands) Paul Meijer (France) Stephane Perrin	Porsche 4.0 L Flat-6	293	+12 Laps
15	992 Am	901	(India) Ajith Kumar Racing by BKR	(Belgium) Mathieu Detry (Belgium) Fabian Duffieux (India) Ajith Kumar	Porsche 992 GT3 Cup	293	+12 Laps
15	992 Am	901	(India) Ajith Kumar Racing by BKR	(Belgium) Mathieu Detry (Belgium) Fabian Duffieux (India) Ajith Kumar	Porsche 4.0 L Flat-6	293	+12 Laps
16	992 Am	973	(Italy) Ebimotors	(Italy) Paolo Gnemmi (Italy) Riccardo Pera (Italy) Davide Roda (Italy) Paolo Venerosi	Porsche 992 GT3 Cup	293	+12 Laps
16	992 Am	973	(Italy) Ebimotors	(Italy) Paolo Gnemmi (Italy) Riccardo Pera (Italy) Davide Roda (Italy) Paolo Venerosi	Porsche 4.0 L Flat-6	293	+12 Laps
17	992 Pro	902	(Denmark) Holmgaard Motorsport	(Denmark) Jonas Holmgaard (Denmark) Magnus Holmgaard (Denmark) Martin Mortensen (Denmark) Patrick Rasmussen	Porsche 992 GT3 Cup	293	+12 Laps
17	992 Pro	902	(Denmark) Holmgaard Motorsport	(Denmark) Jonas Holmgaard (Denmark) Magnus Holmgaard (Denmark) Martin Mortensen (Denmark) Patrick Rasmussen	Porsche 4.0 L Flat-6	293	+12 Laps
18	GT3 Am	11	(Switzerland) Hofor Racing	(Switzerland) Michael Kroll (Germany) Maximilian Partl (Germany) Alexander Prinz (Switzerland) Chantal Prinz	Mercedes-AMG GT3 Evo	292	+13 Laps
18	GT3 Am	11	(Switzerland) Hofor Racing	(Switzerland) Michael Kroll (Germany) Maximilian Partl (Germany) Alexander Prinz (Switzerland) Chantal Prinz	Mercedes-AMG M159 6.2 L V8	292	+13 Laps
19	992 Am	949	(Spain) Escuderia Faraon	(Spain) Pablo Bras Silvero (Spain) Pedro Miguel Lourinho Bras (Spain) Fernando Gonzalez Gonzalez	Porsche 992 GT3 Cup	287	+18 Laps
19	992 Am	949	(Spain) Escuderia Faraon	(Spain) Pablo Bras Silvero (Spain) Pedro Miguel Lourinho Bras (Spain) Fernando Gonzalez Gonzalez	Porsche 4.0 L Flat-6	287	+18 Laps
20	992 Am	992	(Lithuania) Porsche Baltic	(Lithuania) Robertas Kupcikas (Lithuania) Audrius Piktys (Lithuania) Tautvydas Rudokas	Porsche 992 GT3 Cup	284	+21 Laps
20	992 Am	992	(Lithuania) Porsche Baltic	(Lithuania) Robertas Kupcikas (Lithuania) Audrius Piktys (Lithuania) Tautvydas Rudokas	Porsche 4.0 L Flat-6	284	+21 Laps
21	992 Pro	965	(Netherlands) MDM Motorsport	(Netherlands) Tom Coronel (Netherlands) Hjelte Hoffner (Netherlands) Jan Jaap van Roon	Porsche 992 GT3 Cup	281	+24 Laps
21	992 Pro	965	(Netherlands) MDM Motorsport	(Netherlands) Tom Coronel (Netherlands) Hjelte Hoffner (Netherlands) Jan Jaap van Roon	Porsche 4.0 L Flat-6	281	+24 Laps
22	**GT4**	**421**	**(United Kingdom) Venture Engineering**	**(United Kingdom) Matthew George** **(United Kingdom) Matthew Higgins** **(United Kingdom) Christopher Jones** **(United Kingdom) Neville Jones**	**Mercedes-AMG GT4**	**281**	**+24 Laps**
22	**GT4**	**421**	**(United Kingdom) Venture Engineering**	**(United Kingdom) Matthew George** **(United Kingdom) Matthew Higgins** **(United Kingdom) Christopher Jones** **(United Kingdom) Neville Jones**	**Mercedes-AMG M178 4.0 L V8**	**281**	**+24 Laps**
23 DNF	992 Pro	921	(Belgium) Mühlner Motorsport	(Estonia) Martin Rump (Latvia) Valters Zviedris (Germany) Julian Hanses	Porsche 992 GT3 Cup	279	Driveshaft
23 DNF	992 Pro	921	(Belgium) Mühlner Motorsport	(Estonia) Martin Rump (Latvia) Valters Zviedris (Germany) Julian Hanses	Porsche 4.0 L Flat-6	279	Driveshaft
24	GT4	410	(Germany) CCS Racing	(Germany) Jim Gebhardt (Germany) Nikolas Gebhardt	Porsche 718 Cayman GT4 RS Clubsport	279	+26 Laps
24	GT4	410	(Germany) CCS Racing	(Germany) Jim Gebhardt (Germany) Nikolas Gebhardt	Porsche MDG 4.0 L Flat-6	279	+26 Laps
25	GT3 Pro	29	(Italy) Pellin Racing	(United States) Lisa Clark (Canada) Kyle Marcelli	Ferrari 296 GT3	279	+26 Laps
25	GT3 Pro	29	(Italy) Pellin Racing	(United States) Lisa Clark (Canada) Kyle Marcelli	Ferrari F163CE 3.0 L Turbo V6	279	+26 Laps
26	992 Am	928	(Germany) HRT Performance	Alexey Denisov; Sergey Titarenko; Victor Titarenko	Porsche 992 GT3 Cup	276	+29 Laps
26	992 Am	928	(Germany) HRT Performance	Alexey Denisov; Sergey Titarenko; Victor Titarenko	Porsche 4.0 L Flat-6	276	+29 Laps
27	GT3 Pro/Am	73	(Germany) Proton Huber Competition	(Austria) Klaus Bachler (Germany) Jörg Dreisow (Germany) Manuel Lauck	Porsche 911 GT3 R (992)	271	+34 Laps
27	GT3 Pro/Am	73	(Germany) Proton Huber Competition	(Austria) Klaus Bachler (Germany) Jörg Dreisow (Germany) Manuel Lauck	Porsche M97/80 4.2 L Flat-6	271	+34 Laps
28	GTX	701	(France) Vortex V8	(France) Lionel Amrouche (France) Philippe Bonnel (France) Cyril Calmon	Vortex 2.0	239	+66 Laps
28	GTX	701	(France) Vortex V8	(France) Lionel Amrouche (France) Philippe Bonnel (France) Cyril Calmon	Chevrolet LS3 6.2 L V8	239	+66 Laps
29	GTX	111	(Australia) 111 Racing	(Australia) Darren Currie (Australia) Grant Donaldson	IRC GT	238	+67 Laps
29	GTX	111	(Australia) 111 Racing	(Australia) Darren Currie (Australia) Grant Donaldson	GM LS3 6.2 L V8	238	+67 Laps
30	GT4	426	(Italy) Lotus PB Racing	(Italy) Stefano d'Aste (Italy) Massimo Abbati (Italy) Alberto Naska (Italy) Massimiliano Schiavone	Lotus Emira GT4	237	+68 Laps
30	GT4	426	(Italy) Lotus PB Racing	(Italy) Stefano d'Aste (Italy) Massimo Abbati (Italy) Alberto Naska (Italy) Massimiliano Schiavone	Lotus 2GR-FE 3.6 L V6	237	+68 Laps
DNF	GT3 Am	90	(Spain) E2P Racing	(Spain) Pablo Burguera (Spain) Olievr Campos (Spain) Antonio Sainero	Aston Martin Vantage AMR GT3 Evo	83	+222 Laps
DNF	GT3 Am	90	(Spain) E2P Racing	(Spain) Pablo Burguera (Spain) Olievr Campos (Spain) Antonio Sainero	Aston Martin M177 4.0 L Twin-Turbo V8	83	+222 Laps
DNS	GT3 Pro	23	(Italy) Pellin Racing	(United States) Thor Haugen (Italy) Paolo Ruberti	Ferrari 488 GT3 Evo 2020	0	Did not start
DNS	GT3 Pro	23	(Italy) Pellin Racing	(United States) Thor Haugen (Italy) Paolo Ruberti	Ferrari F154CB 3.9 L Turbo V8	0	Did not start

==== Fastest lap ====
Class	No.	Entrant	Driver	Time
GT3	8	(Switzerland) CCC Kessel Racing	(Italy) David Fumanelli	1:46.060
GTX	702	(France) Vortex V8	(France) Arnaud Gomez	1:53.465
992	973	(Italy) Ebimotors	(Italy) Riccardo Pera	1:50.426
GT4	410	(Germany) CCS Racing	(Germany) Nikolas Gebhardt	1:57.799

24H Series
Previous race: None	2025 season	Next race: 12 Hours of Spa-Francorchamps
