= 2025 12 Hours of Spa-Francorchamps =

Endurance racing

The layout of Circuit de Spa-Francorchamps, where the race was held

The 2025 12 Hours of Spa-Francorchamps (known as the 2025 Michelin 12 Hours of Spa-Francorchamps for sponsorship reasons) was an endurance sportscar race held between 18 and 20 April 2025, in Stavelot, Belgium, as the second of five rounds of the 2025 24H Series. It was the seventh running of the event, and the fourth running of the event as part of the 24H Series.

== Background ==
The event was announced on 24 September 2024 along with the rest of the 2025 24H Series calendar.

== Entry list ==
The entry list was announced on 15 April 2025, and features 37 entries over 6 classes – 16 in GT3, 3 in GTX, 10 in 992, 4 in GT4, 2 in SP4, and 2 in TCE.

| No. | Entrant | Car | Class | Driver 1 | Driver 2 | Driver 3 | Driver 4 |
GT3 (16 entries)
| 2 | (Antigua and Barbuda) HAAS RT | Audi R8 LMS Evo II | Am | (United Kingdom) Tom Jackson | (Zimbabwe) Ameerh Naran | | |
| 8 | (Switzerland) Kessel Racing | Ferrari 296 GT3 | PA | (United Kingdom) Matt Bell | (United States) Dustin Blattner | (Germany) Constantin Dressler | (United States) Blake McDonald |
| 11 | (Switzerland) Hofor Racing | Mercedes-AMG GT3 Evo | Am | (Switzerland) Michael Kroll | (Germany) Torsten Kratz | (Germany) Alexander Prinz | (Switzerland) Chantal Prinz |
| 21 | (Antigua and Barbuda) HAAS RT | Audi R8 LMS Evo II | Am | (Belgium) Olivier Bertels | (Belgium) Xavier Knauf | (Belgium) Gregory Servais | |
| 23 | (Italy) Pellin Racing | Ferrari 488 GT3 Evo 2020 | P | (United States) Thor Haugen | (Italy) Paolo Ruberti | | |
| 29 | (Italy) Pellin Racing | Ferrari 296 GT3 | P | (United States) Lisa Clark | (Canada) Kyle Marcelli | (Italy) Felice Jelmini | |
| 44 | (Slovakia) ARC Bratislava | Lamborghini Huracán GT3 Evo 2 | Am | (Slovakia) Miro Konôpka | (China) Liang Jiatong | (Slovakia) Adam Konôpka | (Poland) Andrzej Lewandowski |
| 56 | (Czech Republic) Scuderia Praha | Ferrari 296 GT3 | PA | (Czech Republic) Josef Král | (Czech Republic) Matúš Výboh | (Czech Republic) Miroslav Výboh | (Czech Republic) Dennis Waszek |
| 65 | (Malaysia) Viper Niza Racing | Mercedes-AMG GT3 Evo | Am | (Malaysia) Dominic Ang | (Malaysia) Douglas Khoo | (Malaysia) Melvin Moh | |
| 69 | (United Kingdom) Continental Racing by Simpson Motorsport | Audi R8 LMS Evo II | Am | David Pogosyan | (Kyrgyzstan) Andrey Solukovtsev | (Cyprus) Vasily Vladykin | |
| 71 | (Lithuania) Juta Racing | Audi R8 LMS Evo II | Am | (Lithuania) Arunas Geciauskas | (Italy) Nicola Michelon | (Switzerland) Tim Müller | |
| 73 | (Germany) Proton Huber Competition | Porsche 911 GT3 R (992) | PA | (Austria) Klaus Bachler | (Germany) Jörg Dreisow | (Germany) Manuel Lauck | (Germany) Constantin Dressler |
| 81 | (United States) Era Motorsport | Ferrari 296 GT3 | PA | (United Kingdom) Jake Hill | (United States) Dwight Merriman | (United States) Kyle Tilley | (United States) Ryan Dalziel |
| 90 | (Spain) E2P Racing | Aston Martin Vantage AMR GT3 Evo | Am | (Spain) Pablo Burguera | (Spain) Olievr Campos | (Spain) Antonio Sainero | |
| 93 | (Belgium) Red Ant Racing | Mercedes-AMG GT3 Evo | P | (Belgium) Kobe de Breucker | (Germany) Kenneth Heyer | (Belgium) Ayrton Redant | (Belgium) Yannick Redant |
| 193 | (Germany) Ziggo Sport - Tempesta Racing | Porsche 911 GT3 R (992) | P | (Hong Kong) Jonathan Hui | (United Kingdom) Chris Froggatt | (Netherlands) Loek Hartog | |
SP4 (2 entries)
| 4 | (Slovakia) ARC Bratislava | Lamborghini Huracán GT3 Evo | | (Slovakia) Miro Konôpka | (China) Liang Jiatong | (Slovakia) Adam Konôpka | (Poland) Andrzej Lewandowski |
| 91 | (Germany) Herberth Motorsport | Porsche 911 GT3 R Evo (992) | | (Germany) Ralf Bohn | (Germany) Laurin Heinrich | (Germany) Alfred Renauer | (Germany) Robert Renauer |
GTX (3 entries)
| 111 | (Australia) 111 Racing | IRC GT | | (Australia) Darren Currie | (Australia) Geoffrey Emery | (Australia) Daniel Studdard | |
| 701 | (France) Vortex V8 | Vortex 2.0 | | (France) Lionel Amrouche | (France) Philippe Bonnel | (France) Cyril Calmon | |
| 702 | (France) Vortex V8 | Vortex 2.0 | | (France) Lionel Amrouche | (France) Julien Boillot | (France) Alexandre De Bernardinis | |
992 (10 entries)
| 888 | (France) SebLajoux Racing | Porsche 992 GT3 Cup | Am | (Germany) Marlon Menden | (France) Sebastien Lajoux | (Netherlands) Paul Meijer | (France) Stephane Perrin |
| 901 | (India) Ajith Kumar Racing by Red Ant | Porsche 992 GT3 Cup | Am | (Belgium) Mathieu Detry | (Belgium) Fabian Duffieux | (India) Ajith Kumar | |
| 902 | (Denmark) Holmgaard Motorsport | Porsche 992 GT3 Cup | P | (Denmark) Jonas Holmgaard | (Denmark) Magnus Holmgaard | (Denmark) Martin Mortensen | (Denmark) Patrick Rasmussen |
| 907 | (Germany) RPM Racing | Porsche 992 GT3 Cup | Am | (Germany) Philip Hamprecht | (Sweden) Niclas Jönsson | (United States) Tracy Krohn | |
| 909 | (Netherlands) Red Camel-Jordans.nl | Porsche 992 GT3 Cup | P | (Netherlands) Luc Breukers | (Netherlands) Rik Breukers | (Switzerland) Fabian Denz | (Netherlands) Ivo Breukers |
| 911 | (Germany) 9und11 Racing | Porsche 992 GT3 Cup | Am | (Germany) Georg Goder | (Germany) Ralf Oehme | (Germany) Martin Schlüter | (Germany) Tim Scheerbarth |
| 918 | (Belgium) Mühlner Motorsport | Porsche 992 GT3 Cup | P | (Germany) Felipe Fernández Laser | (Germany) David Jahn | (Germany) Nick Salewsky | |
| 921 | (Belgium) Mühlner Motorsport | Porsche 992 GT3 Cup | P | (Estonia) Martin Rump | (Latvia) Valters Zviedris | (Germany) Julian Hanses | |
| 925 | (Netherlands) Van Berlo Motorsport by Bas Koeten Racing | Porsche 992 GT3 Cup | Am | (Netherlands) Glenn van Berlo | (Netherlands) Marcel van Berlo | (Netherlands) Bart van Helden | |
| 949 | (Spain) Escuderia Faraon | Porsche 992 GT3 Cup | Am | (Spain) Pablo Bras Silvero | (Spain) Pedro Miguel Lourinho Bras | (Spain) Agustin Sanabria Crespo | |
GT4 (4 entries)
| 419 | (Belgium) Hamofa Motorsport | BMW M4 GT4 Evo (G82) | | (Belgium) Kris Verhoeven | (Belgium) Mark Verhoeven | (Belgium) Rob Verhoeven | |
| 421 | (United Kingdom) Venture Engineering | Mercedes-AMG GT4 | | (United Kingdom) Matthew George | (United Kingdom) Matthew Higgins | (United Kingdom) Christopher Jones | (United Kingdom) Neville Jones |
| 427 | (Germany) SRS Team Sorg Rennsport | Porsche 718 Cayman GT4 RS Clubsport | | (France) Thierry Chkondali | (France) Marc Girard | (Canada) Michel Sallenbach | |
| 452 | (Germany) SRS Team Sorg Rennsport | Porsche 718 Cayman GT4 RS Clubsport | | (United Kingdom) Harley Haughton | (Germany) Maximilian Hill | (New Zealand) Guy Stewart | (Mexico) Benito Tagle |
TCE (2 entries)
| 102 | (Germany) asBest Racing | Cupra TCR DSG | | (Germany) Christian Ladurner | (Germany) Pia Ohlsson | (Japan) Junichi Umemoto | |
| 133 | (United Kingdom) J-Mec Engineering | BMW M3 E46 | | (United Kingdom) Kevin Clarke | (United Kingdom) James Collins | | |

GT3 entries
| Icon | Class |
|---|---|
| P | GT3-Pro |
| PA | GT3-Pro/Am |
| Am | GT3-Am |
992 entries
| Icon | Class |
| P | 992-Pro |
| Am | 992-Am |

== Schedule ==
| Date | Time (local: CET) | Event | Duration |
|---|---|---|---|
| Friday, 18 April | 12:15 - 13:45 | Free practice | 90 minutes |
| Friday, 18 April | 15:30 - 15:45 | Qualifying Session 1 - All Classes | 3x15 minutes |
| Friday, 18 April | 15:52 - 16:07 | Qualifying Session 2 - All Classes | 3x15 minutes |
| Friday, 18 April | 16:14 - 16:29 | Qualifying Session 3 - All Classes | 3x15 minutes |
| Saturday, 19 April | 12:50 - 17:50 | Race - Part 1 | 5 hours |
| Sunday, 20 April | 10:50 - 17:50 | Race - Part 2 | 7 hours |

== Free Practice ==
| Class | No. | Entrant | Driver | Time |
|---|---|---|---|---|
| GT3 | 23 | (Italy) Pellin Racing | (Italy) Paolo Ruberti | 2:16.310 |
| SP4 | 91 | (Germany) Herberth Motorsport | (Germany) Alfred Renauer | 2:18.763 |
| GTX | 111 | (Australia) 111 Racing | (Australia) Darren Currie | 2:28.003 |
| 992 | 921 | (Belgium) Mühlner Motorsport | (Germany) Julian Hanses | 2:22.095 |
| GT4 | 452 | (Germany) SRS Team Sorg Rennsport | (United Kingdom) Harley Haughton | 2:30.028 |
| TCE | 133 | (United Kingdom) J-Mec Engineering | (United Kingdom) James Collins | 2:36.301 |

- Note: Only the fastest car in each class is shown.

== Qualifying ==
Qualifying was split into three parts. The average of the best times per qualifying session determined the starting order. Hofor Racing secured pole position with a combined average time of 2:17.826.

=== Qualifying results ===
Pole position winners in each class are marked in bold.

| Pos. | Class | No. | Team | Avg |
|---|---|---|---|---|
| 1 | **GT3 Am** | **11** | **(Switzerland) Hofor Racing** | **2:17.826** |
| 2 | **GT3 Pro** | **93** | **(Belgium) Red Ant Racing** | **2:18.631** |
| 3 | GT3 Am | 90 | (Spain) E2P Racing | 2:18.897 |
| 4 | **SP4** | **91** | **(Germany) Herberth Motorsport** | **2:19.251** |
| 5 | GT3 Pro | 193 | (Germany) Ziggo Sport - Tempesta Racing | 2:19.698 |
| 6 | **GT3 Pro/Am** | **56** | **(Czech Republic) Scuderia Praha** | **2:19.894** |
| 7 | GT3 Pro/Am | 8 | (Switzerland) Kessel Racing | 2:20.792 |
| 8 | GT3 Pro/Am | 73 | (Germany) Proton Huber Competition | 2:20.944 |
| 9 | **992 Pro** | **921** | **(Belgium) Mühlner Motorsport** | **2:21.109** |
| 10 | 992 Pro | 909 | (Netherlands) Red Camel-Jordans.nl | 2:21.226 |
| 11 | GT3 Am | 71 | (Lithuania) Juta Racing | 2:21.324 |
| 12 | GT3 Pro | 23 | (Italy) Pellin Racing | 2:21.690 |
| 13 | GT3 Am | 21 | (Antigua and Barbuda) HAAS RT | 2:21.956 |
| 14 | 992 Pro | 918 | (Belgium) Mühlner Motorsport | 2:22.104 |
| 15 | **992 Am** | **888** | **(France) SebLajoux Racing** | **2:22.569** |
| 16 | GT3 Pro/Am | 81 | (United States) Era Motorsport | 2:22.727 |
| 17 | GT3 Am | 2 | (Antigua and Barbuda) HAAS RT | 2:23.263 |
| 18 | 992 Am | 907 | (Germany) RPM Racing | 2:24.009 |
| 19 | 992 Am | 901 | (India) Ajith Kumar Racing by Red Ant | 2:24.448 |
| 20 | 992 Pro | 902 | (Denmark) Holmgaard Motorsport | 2:24.578 |
| 21 | GT3 Pro | 29 | (Italy) Pellin Racing | 2:25.488 |
| 22 | **GTX** | **111** | **(Australia) 111 Racing** | **2:26.064** |
| 23 | 992 Am | 925 | (Netherlands) Van Berlo Motorsport by Bas Koeten Racing | 2:26.764 |
| 24 | GT3 Am | 65 | (Malaysia) Viper Niza Racing | 2:27.121 |
| 25 | 992 Am | 911 | (Germany) 9und11 Racing | 2:28.283 |
| 26 | 992 Am | 949 | (Spain) Escuderia Faraon | 2:29.369 |
| 27 | GTX | 701 | (France) Vortex V8 | 2:30.796 |
| 28 | **GT4** | **419** | **(Belgium) Hamofa Motorsport** | **2:32.547** |
| 29 | GT4 | 452 | (Germany) SRS Team Sorg Rennsport | 2:33.338 |
| 30 | **TCE** | **133** | **(United Kingdom) J-Mec Engineering** | **2:35.983** |
| 31 | GT3 Am | 44 | (Slovakia) ARC Bratislava | 2:36.641 |
| 32 | GTX | 702 | (France) Vortex V8 | 2:38.130 |
| 33 | GT4 | 421 | (United Kingdom) Venture Engineering | 2:38.844 |
| 34 | GT4 | 427 | (Germany) SRS Team Sorg Rennsport | 2:40.478 |
| 35 | TCE | 102 | (Germany) asBest Racing | 2:41.605 |
| – | GT3 Am | 69 | (United Arab Emirates) Continental Racing by Simpson Motorsport | No time |

== Race ==
The race was won overall by the No. 193 Ziggo Sport - Tempesta Racing Porsche 911 GT3 R (992) followed by the No. 91 Herberth Motorsport Porsche 911 GT3 R Evo (992) in second and the No. 11 Hofor Racing Mercedes-AMG GT3 Evo in third.

=== Race results ===
==== Part 1 ====
Class winners are in bold.

| Pos | Class | No. | Team | Drivers | Car | Laps | Time/Retired |
| Pos | Class | No. | Team | Drivers | Engine | Laps | Time/Retired |
|---|---|---|---|---|---|---|---|
| 1 | **GT3 Pro** | **193** | **(Germany) Ziggo Sport - Tempesta Racing** | **(United Kingdom) Chris Froggatt** **(Netherlands) Loek Hartog** **(Hong Kong) Jonathan Hui** | **Porsche 911 GT3 R (992)** | **111** | **5:01:34.182** |
| 1 | **GT3 Pro** | **193** | **(Germany) Ziggo Sport - Tempesta Racing** | **(United Kingdom) Chris Froggatt** **(Netherlands) Loek Hartog** **(Hong Kong) Jonathan Hui** | **Porsche M97/80 4.2 L Flat-6** | **111** | **5:01:34.182** |
| 2 | **SP4** | **91** | **(Germany) Herberth Motorsport** | **(Germany) Ralf Bohn** **(Germany) Laurin Heinrich** **(Germany) Alfred Renauer** **(Germany) Robert Renauer** | **Porsche 911 GT3 R Evo (992)** | **111** | **+34.543** |
| 2 | **SP4** | **91** | **(Germany) Herberth Motorsport** | **(Germany) Ralf Bohn** **(Germany) Laurin Heinrich** **(Germany) Alfred Renauer** **(Germany) Robert Renauer** | **Porsche M97/80 4.2 L Flat-6** | **111** | **+34.543** |
| 3 | **GT3 Am** | **11** | **(Switzerland) Hofor Racing** | **(Switzerland) Michael Kroll** **(Germany) Torsten Kratz** **(Germany) Alexander Prinz** **(Switzerland) Chantal Prinz** | **Mercedes-AMG GT3 Evo** | **108** | **+3 Laps** |
| 3 | **GT3 Am** | **11** | **(Switzerland) Hofor Racing** | **(Switzerland) Michael Kroll** **(Germany) Torsten Kratz** **(Germany) Alexander Prinz** **(Switzerland) Chantal Prinz** | **Mercedes-AMG M159 6.2 L V8** | **108** | **+3 Laps** |
| 4 | **GT3 Pro/Am** | **56** | **(Czech Republic) Scuderia Praha** | **(Czech Republic) Josef Král** **(Czech Republic) Matúš Výboh** **(Czech Republic) Miroslav Výboh** **(Czech Republic) Dennis Waszek** | **Ferrari 296 GT3** | **108** | **+3 Laps** |
| 4 | **GT3 Pro/Am** | **56** | **(Czech Republic) Scuderia Praha** | **(Czech Republic) Josef Král** **(Czech Republic) Matúš Výboh** **(Czech Republic) Miroslav Výboh** **(Czech Republic) Dennis Waszek** | **Ferrari F163CE 3.0 L Turbo V6** | **108** | **+3 Laps** |
| 5 | **992 Am** | **925** | **(Netherlands) Van Berlo Motorsport by Bas Koeten Racing** | **(Netherlands) Glenn van Berlo** **(Netherlands) Marcel van Berlo** **(Netherlands) Bart van Helden** | **Porsche 992 GT3 Cup** | **107** | **+4 Laps** |
| 5 | **992 Am** | **925** | **(Netherlands) Van Berlo Motorsport by Bas Koeten Racing** | **(Netherlands) Glenn van Berlo** **(Netherlands) Marcel van Berlo** **(Netherlands) Bart van Helden** | **Porsche 4.0 L Flat-6** | **107** | **+4 Laps** |
| 6 | **992 Pro** | **902** | **(Denmark) Holmgaard Motorsport** | **(Denmark) Jonas Holmgaard** **(Denmark) Magnus Holmgaard** **(Denmark) Martin Mortensen** **(Denmark) Patrick Rasmussen** | **Porsche 992 GT3 Cup** | **107** | **+4 Laps** |
| 6 | **992 Pro** | **902** | **(Denmark) Holmgaard Motorsport** | **(Denmark) Jonas Holmgaard** **(Denmark) Magnus Holmgaard** **(Denmark) Martin Mortensen** **(Denmark) Patrick Rasmussen** | **Porsche 4.0 L Flat-6** | **107** | **+4 Laps** |
| 7 | 992 Pro | 909 | (Netherlands) Red Camel-Jordans.nl | (Netherlands) Luc Breukers (Netherlands) Rik Breukers (Switzerland) Fabian Denz (Netherlands) Ivo Breukers | Porsche 992 GT3 Cup | 107 | +4 Laps |
| 7 | 992 Pro | 909 | (Netherlands) Red Camel-Jordans.nl | (Netherlands) Luc Breukers (Netherlands) Rik Breukers (Switzerland) Fabian Denz (Netherlands) Ivo Breukers | Porsche 4.0 L Flat-6 | 107 | +4 Laps |
| 8 | 992 Am | 888 | (France) SebLajoux Racing | (Germany) Marlon Menden (France) Sebastien Lajoux (Netherlands) Paul Meijer (France) Stephane Perrin | Porsche 992 GT3 Cup | 106 | +5 Laps |
| 8 | 992 Am | 888 | (France) SebLajoux Racing | (Germany) Marlon Menden (France) Sebastien Lajoux (Netherlands) Paul Meijer (France) Stephane Perrin | Porsche 4.0 L Flat-6 | 106 | +5 Laps |
| 9 | GT3 Am | 65 | (Malaysia) Viper Niza Racing | (Malaysia) Dominic Ang (Malaysia) Douglas Khoo (Malaysia) Melvin Moh | Mercedes-AMG GT3 Evo | 106 | +5 Laps |
| 9 | GT3 Am | 65 | (Malaysia) Viper Niza Racing | (Malaysia) Dominic Ang (Malaysia) Douglas Khoo (Malaysia) Melvin Moh | Mercedes-AMG M159 6.2 L V8 | 106 | +5 Laps |
| 10 | GT3 Am | 69 | (United Arab Emirates) Continental Racing by Simpson Motorsport | David Pogosyan (Kyrgyzstan) Andrey Solukovtsev (Cyprus) Vasily Vladykin | Audi R8 LMS Evo II | 106 | +5 Laps |
| 10 | GT3 Am | 69 | (United Arab Emirates) Continental Racing by Simpson Motorsport | David Pogosyan (Kyrgyzstan) Andrey Solukovtsev (Cyprus) Vasily Vladykin | Audi DAR 5.2 L V10 | 106 | +5 Laps |
| 11 | GT3 Pro | 29 | (Italy) Pellin Racing | (United States) Lisa Clark (Canada) Kyle Marcelli | Ferrari 296 GT3 | 106 | +5 Laps |
| 11 | GT3 Pro | 29 | (Italy) Pellin Racing | (United States) Lisa Clark (Canada) Kyle Marcelli | Ferrari F163CE 3.0 L Turbo V6 | 106 | +5 Laps |
| 12 | 992 Am | 907 | (Germany) RPM Racing | (Germany) Philip Hamprecht (Sweden) Niclas Jönsson (United States) Tracy Krohn | Porsche 992 GT3 Cup | 106 | +5 Laps |
| 12 | 992 Am | 907 | (Germany) RPM Racing | (Germany) Philip Hamprecht (Sweden) Niclas Jönsson (United States) Tracy Krohn | Porsche 4.0 L Flat-6 | 106 | +5 Laps |
| 13 | GT3 Am | 2 | (Antigua and Barbuda) HAAS RT | (United Kingdom) Tom Jackson (Zimbabwe) Ameerh Naran | Audi R8 LMS Evo II | 105 | +6 Laps |
| 13 | GT3 Am | 2 | (Antigua and Barbuda) HAAS RT | (United Kingdom) Tom Jackson (Zimbabwe) Ameerh Naran | Audi DAR 5.2 L V10 | 105 | +6 Laps |
| 14 | 992 Am | 949 | (Spain) Escuderia Faraon | (Spain) Pablo Bras Silvero (Spain) Pedro Miguel Lourinho Bras (Spain) Agustin Sanabria Crespo | Porsche 992 GT3 Cup | 104 | +7 Laps |
| 14 | 992 Am | 949 | (Spain) Escuderia Faraon | (Spain) Pablo Bras Silvero (Spain) Pedro Miguel Lourinho Bras (Spain) Agustin Sanabria Crespo | Porsche 4.0 L Flat-6 | 104 | +7 Laps |
| 15 | 992 Am | 901 | (India) Ajith Kumar Racing by Red Ant | (Belgium) Mathieu Detry (Belgium) Fabian Duffieux (India) Ajith Kumar | Porsche 992 GT3 Cup | 104 | +7 Laps |
| 15 | 992 Am | 901 | (India) Ajith Kumar Racing by Red Ant | (Belgium) Mathieu Detry (Belgium) Fabian Duffieux (India) Ajith Kumar | Porsche 4.0 L Flat-6 | 104 | +7 Laps |
| 16 | **GTX** | **701** | **(France) Vortex V8** | **(France) Lionel Amrouche** **(France) Philippe Bonnel** **(France) Cyril Calmon** | **Vortex 2.0** | **104** | **+7 Laps** |
| 16 | **GTX** | **701** | **(France) Vortex V8** | **(France) Lionel Amrouche** **(France) Philippe Bonnel** **(France) Cyril Calmon** | **Chevrolet LS3 6.2 L V8** | **104** | **+7 Laps** |
| 17 | GTX | 111 | (Australia) 111 Racing | (Australia) Darren Currie (Australia) Geoffrey Emery (Australia) Daniel Studdard | IRC GT | 103 | +8 Laps |
| 17 | GTX | 111 | (Australia) 111 Racing | (Australia) Darren Currie (Australia) Geoffrey Emery (Australia) Daniel Studdard | GM LS3 6.2 L V8 | 103 | +8 Laps |
| 18 | 992 Am | 911 | (Germany) 9und11 Racing | (Germany) Georg Goder (Germany) Ralf Oehme (Germany) Martin Schlüter (Germany) Tim Scheerbarth | Porsche 992 GT3 Cup | 103 | +8 Laps |
| 18 | 992 Am | 911 | (Germany) 9und11 Racing | (Germany) Georg Goder (Germany) Ralf Oehme (Germany) Martin Schlüter (Germany) Tim Scheerbarth | Porsche 4.0 L Flat-6 | 103 | +8 Laps |
| 19 | 992 Pro | 921 | (Belgium) Mühlner Motorsport | (Estonia) Martin Rump (Latvia) Valters Zviedris (Germany) Julian Hanses | Porsche 992 GT3 Cup | 102 | +9 Laps |
| 19 | 992 Pro | 921 | (Belgium) Mühlner Motorsport | (Estonia) Martin Rump (Latvia) Valters Zviedris (Germany) Julian Hanses | Porsche 4.0 L Flat-6 | 102 | +9 Laps |
| 20 | **GT4** | **421** | **(United Kingdom) Venture Engineering** | **(United Kingdom) Matthew George** **(United Kingdom) Matthew Higgins** **(United Kingdom) Christopher Jones** **(United Kingdom) Neville Jones** | **Mercedes-AMG GT4** | **101** | **+10 Laps** |
| 20 | **GT4** | **421** | **(United Kingdom) Venture Engineering** | **(United Kingdom) Matthew George** **(United Kingdom) Matthew Higgins** **(United Kingdom) Christopher Jones** **(United Kingdom) Neville Jones** | **Mercedes-AMG M178 4.0 L V8** | **101** | **+10 Laps** |
| 21 | GT3 Am | 71 | (Lithuania) Juta Racing | (Lithuania) Arunas Geciauskas (Italy) Nicola Michelon (Switzerland) Tim Müller | Audi R8 LMS Evo II | 100 | +11 Laps |
| 21 | GT3 Am | 71 | (Lithuania) Juta Racing | (Lithuania) Arunas Geciauskas (Italy) Nicola Michelon (Switzerland) Tim Müller | Audi DAR 5.2 L V10 | 100 | +11 Laps |
| 22 | GTX | 702 | (France) Vortex V8 | (France) Lionel Amrouche (France) Julien Boillot (France) Alexandre De Bernardinis | Vortex 2.0 | 99 | +12 Laps |
| 22 | GTX | 702 | (France) Vortex V8 | (France) Lionel Amrouche (France) Julien Boillot (France) Alexandre De Bernardinis | Chevrolet LS3 6.2 L V8 | 99 | +12 Laps |
| 23 | GT4 | 452 | (Germany) SRS Team Sorg Rennsport | (United Kingdom) Harley Haughton (Germany) Maximilian Hill (New Zealand) Guy Stewart (Mexico) Benito Tagle | Porsche 718 Cayman GT4 RS Clubsport | 99 | +12 Laps |
| 23 | GT4 | 452 | (Germany) SRS Team Sorg Rennsport | (United Kingdom) Harley Haughton (Germany) Maximilian Hill (New Zealand) Guy Stewart (Mexico) Benito Tagle | Porsche MDG 4.0 L Flat-6 | 99 | +12 Laps |
| 24 | **TCE** | **133** | **(United Kingdom) J-Mec Engineering** | **(United Kingdom) Kevin Clarke** **(United Kingdom) James Collins** | **BMW M3 E46** | **99** | **+12 Laps** |
| 24 | **TCE** | **133** | **(United Kingdom) J-Mec Engineering** | **(United Kingdom) Kevin Clarke** **(United Kingdom) James Collins** | **BMW 3.0 L I4** | **99** | **+12 Laps** |
| 25 | GT4 | 427 | (Germany) SRS Team Sorg Rennsport | (France) Thierry Chkondali (France) Marc Girard (Canada) Michel Sallenbach | Porsche 718 Cayman GT4 RS Clubsport | 98 | +13 Laps |
| 25 | GT4 | 427 | (Germany) SRS Team Sorg Rennsport | (France) Thierry Chkondali (France) Marc Girard (Canada) Michel Sallenbach | Porsche MDG 4.0 L Flat-6 | 98 | +13 Laps |
| 26 | GT3 Am | 90 | (Spain) E2P Racing | (Spain) Pablo Burguera (Spain) Oliver Campos (Spain) Antonio Sainero | Aston Martin Vantage AMR GT3 Evo | 97 | +14 Laps |
| 26 | GT3 Am | 90 | (Spain) E2P Racing | (Spain) Pablo Burguera (Spain) Oliver Campos (Spain) Antonio Sainero | Aston Martin M177 4.0 L Twin-Turbo V8 | 97 | +14 Laps |
| 27 | GT3 Pro/Am | 73 | (Germany) Proton Huber Competition | (Austria) Klaus Bachler (Germany) Jörg Dreisow (Germany) Manuel Lauck (Germany) Constantin Dressler | Porsche 911 GT3 R (992) | 96 | +15 Laps |
| 27 | GT3 Pro/Am | 73 | (Germany) Proton Huber Competition | (Austria) Klaus Bachler (Germany) Jörg Dreisow (Germany) Manuel Lauck (Germany) Constantin Dressler | Porsche M97/80 4.2 L Flat-6 | 96 | +15 Laps |
| 28 | TCE | 102 | (Germany) asBest Racing | (Germany) Christian Ladurner (Germany) Pia Ohlsson (Japan) Junichi Umemoto | CUPRA León TCR | 96 | +15 Laps |
| 28 | TCE | 102 | (Germany) asBest Racing | (Germany) Christian Ladurner (Germany) Pia Ohlsson (Japan) Junichi Umemoto | Volkswagen EA888 2.0 L I4 | 96 | +15 Laps |
| 29 | GT4 | 419 | (Belgium) Hamofa Motorsport | (Belgium) Kris Verhoeven (Belgium) Mark Verhoeven (Belgium) Rob Verhoeven | BMW M4 GT4 Evo (G82) | 86 | +25 Laps |
| 29 | GT4 | 419 | (Belgium) Hamofa Motorsport | (Belgium) Kris Verhoeven (Belgium) Mark Verhoeven (Belgium) Rob Verhoeven | BMW S58B30T0 3.0 L Twin-Turbo I6 | 86 | +25 Laps |
| 30 | GT3 Pro | 93 | (Belgium) Red Ant Racing | (Belgium) Kobe de Breucker (Germany) Kenneth Heyer (Belgium) Ayrton Redant (Belgium) Yannick Redant | Mercedes-AMG GT3 Evo | 84 | +27 Laps |
| 30 | GT3 Pro | 93 | (Belgium) Red Ant Racing | (Belgium) Kobe de Breucker (Germany) Kenneth Heyer (Belgium) Ayrton Redant (Belgium) Yannick Redant | Mercedes-AMG M159 6.2 L V8 | 84 | +27 Laps |
| 31 | GT3 Pro/Am | 81 | (United States) Era Motorsport | (United Kingdom) Jake Hill (United States) Dwight Merriman (United States) Kyle Tilley (United States) Ryan Dalziel | Ferrari 296 GT3 | 76 | +35 Laps |
| 31 | GT3 Pro/Am | 81 | (United States) Era Motorsport | (United Kingdom) Jake Hill (United States) Dwight Merriman (United States) Kyle Tilley (United States) Ryan Dalziel | Ferrari F163CE 3.0 L Turbo V6 | 76 | +35 Laps |
| 32 | GT3 Pro/Am | 8 | (Switzerland) Kessel Racing | (United Kingdom) Matt Bell (United States) Dustin Blattner (Germany) Constantin Dressler (United States) Blake McDonald | Ferrari 296 GT3 | 75 | +36 Laps |
| 32 | GT3 Pro/Am | 8 | (Switzerland) Kessel Racing | (United Kingdom) Matt Bell (United States) Dustin Blattner (Germany) Constantin Dressler (United States) Blake McDonald | Ferrari F163CE 3.0 L Turbo V6 | 75 | +36 Laps |
| 33 DNF | GT3 Am | 21 | (Antigua and Barbuda) HAAS RT | (Belgium) Olivier Bertels (Belgium) Xavier Knauf (Belgium) Gregory Servais | Audi R8 LMS Evo II | 57 | +54 Laps |
| 33 DNF | GT3 Am | 21 | (Antigua and Barbuda) HAAS RT | (Belgium) Olivier Bertels (Belgium) Xavier Knauf (Belgium) Gregory Servais | Audi DAR 5.2 L V10 | 57 | +54 Laps |
| 34 DNF | GT3 Pro | 23 | (Italy) Pellin Racing | (United States) Thor Haugen (Italy) Paolo Ruberti | Ferrari 488 GT3 Evo 2020 | 52 | +59 Laps |
| 34 DNF | GT3 Pro | 23 | (Italy) Pellin Racing | (United States) Thor Haugen (Italy) Paolo Ruberti | Ferrari F154CB 3.9 L Turbo V8 | 52 | +59 Laps |
| 35 DNF | GT3 Am | 44 | (Slovakia) ARC Bratislava | (Slovakia) Miro Konôpka (China) Liang Jiatong (Slovakia) Adam Konôpka (Poland) Andrzej Lewandowski | Lamborghini Huracán GT3 Evo 2 | 4 | +107 Laps |
| 35 DNF | GT3 Am | 44 | (Slovakia) ARC Bratislava | (Slovakia) Miro Konôpka (China) Liang Jiatong (Slovakia) Adam Konôpka (Poland) Andrzej Lewandowski | Lamborghini DGF 5.2 L V10 | 4 | +107 Laps |
| DNF | 992 Pro | 918 | (Belgium) Mühlner Motorsport | (Germany) Felipe Fernández Laser (Germany) David Jahn (Germany) Nick Salewsky | Porsche 992 GT3 Cup | 0 | Accident |
| DNF | 992 Pro | 918 | (Belgium) Mühlner Motorsport | (Germany) Felipe Fernández Laser (Germany) David Jahn (Germany) Nick Salewsky | Porsche 4.0 L Flat-6 | 0 | Accident |

==== Part 2 ====
Class winners are in bold.

| Pos | Class | No. | Team | Drivers | Car | Laps | Time/Retired |
| Pos | Class | No. | Team | Drivers | Engine | Laps | Time/Retired |
|---|---|---|---|---|---|---|---|
| 1 | **GT3 Pro** | **193** | **(Germany) Ziggo Sport - Tempesta Racing** | **(United Kingdom) Chris Froggatt** **(Netherlands) Loek Hartog** **(Hong Kong) Jonathan Hui** | **Porsche 911 GT3 R (992)** | **269** | **7:01:47.385** |
| 1 | **GT3 Pro** | **193** | **(Germany) Ziggo Sport - Tempesta Racing** | **(United Kingdom) Chris Froggatt** **(Netherlands) Loek Hartog** **(Hong Kong) Jonathan Hui** | **Porsche M97/80 4.2 L Flat-6** | **269** | **7:01:47.385** |
| 2 | **SP4** | **91** | **(Germany) Herberth Motorsport** | **(Germany) Ralf Bohn** **(Germany) Laurin Heinrich** **(Germany) Alfred Renauer** **(Germany) Robert Renauer** | **Porsche 911 GT3 R (992)** | **269** | **+4:33.152** |
| 2 | **SP4** | **91** | **(Germany) Herberth Motorsport** | **(Germany) Ralf Bohn** **(Germany) Laurin Heinrich** **(Germany) Alfred Renauer** **(Germany) Robert Renauer** | **Porsche M97/80 4.2 L Flat-6** | **269** | **+4:33.152** |
| 3 | **GT3 Am** | **11** | **(Switzerland) Hofor Racing** | **(Switzerland) Michael Kroll** **(Germany) Torsten Kratz** **(Germany) Alexander Prinz** **(Switzerland) Chantal Prinz** | **Mercedes-AMG GT3 Evo** | **267** | **+2 Laps** |
| 3 | **GT3 Am** | **11** | **(Switzerland) Hofor Racing** | **(Switzerland) Michael Kroll** **(Germany) Torsten Kratz** **(Germany) Alexander Prinz** **(Switzerland) Chantal Prinz** | **Mercedes-AMG M159 6.2 L V8** | **267** | **+2 Laps** |
| 4 | **GT3 Pro/Am** | **56** | **(Czech Republic) Scuderia Praha** | **(Czech Republic) Josef Král** **(Czech Republic) Matúš Výboh** **(Czech Republic) Miroslav Výboh** **(Czech Republic) Dennis Waszek** | **Ferrari 296 GT3** | **266** | **+3 Laps** |
| 4 | **GT3 Pro/Am** | **56** | **(Czech Republic) Scuderia Praha** | **(Czech Republic) Josef Král** **(Czech Republic) Matúš Výboh** **(Czech Republic) Miroslav Výboh** **(Czech Republic) Dennis Waszek** | **Ferrari F163CE 3.0 L Turbo V6** | **266** | **+3 Laps** |
| 5 | **992 Pro** | **909** | **(Netherlands) Red Camel-Jordans.nl** | **(Netherlands) Luc Breukers** **(Netherlands) Rik Breukers** **(Switzerland) Fabian Denz** **(Netherlands) Ivo Breukers** | **Porsche 992 GT3 Cup** | **264** | **+5 Laps** |
| 5 | **992 Pro** | **909** | **(Netherlands) Red Camel-Jordans.nl** | **(Netherlands) Luc Breukers** **(Netherlands) Rik Breukers** **(Switzerland) Fabian Denz** **(Netherlands) Ivo Breukers** | **Porsche 4.0 L Flat-6** | **264** | **+5 Laps** |
| 6 | GT3 Am | 65 | (Malaysia) Viper Niza Racing | (Malaysia) Dominic Ang (Malaysia) Douglas Khoo (Malaysia) Melvin Moh | Mercedes-AMG GT3 Evo | 261 | +8 Laps |
| 6 | GT3 Am | 65 | (Malaysia) Viper Niza Racing | (Malaysia) Dominic Ang (Malaysia) Douglas Khoo (Malaysia) Melvin Moh | Mercedes-AMG M159 6.2 L V8 | 261 | +8 Laps |
| 7 | **992 Am** | **907** | **(Germany) RPM Racing** | **(Germany) Philip Hamprecht** **(Sweden) Niclas Jönsson** **(United States) Tracy Krohn** | **Porsche 992 GT3 Cup** | **260** | **+9 Laps** |
| 7 | **992 Am** | **907** | **(Germany) RPM Racing** | **(Germany) Philip Hamprecht** **(Sweden) Niclas Jönsson** **(United States) Tracy Krohn** | **Porsche 4.0 L Flat-6** | **260** | **+9 Laps** |
| 8 | 992 Pro | 902 | (Denmark) Holmgaard Motorsport | (Denmark) Jonas Holmgaard (Denmark) Magnus Holmgaard (Denmark) Martin Mortensen (Denmark) Patrick Rasmussen | Porsche 992 GT3 Cup | 260 | +9 Laps |
| 8 | 992 Pro | 902 | (Denmark) Holmgaard Motorsport | (Denmark) Jonas Holmgaard (Denmark) Magnus Holmgaard (Denmark) Martin Mortensen (Denmark) Patrick Rasmussen | Porsche 4.0 L Flat-6 | 260 | +9 Laps |
| 9 | 992 Pro | 921 | (Belgium) Mühlner Motorsport | (Estonia) Martin Rump (Latvia) Valters Zviedris (Germany) Julian Hanses | Porsche 992 GT3 Cup | 260 | +9 Laps |
| 9 | 992 Pro | 921 | (Belgium) Mühlner Motorsport | (Estonia) Martin Rump (Latvia) Valters Zviedris (Germany) Julian Hanses | Porsche 4.0 L Flat-6 | 260 | +9 Laps |
| 10 | GT3 Am | 71 | (Lithuania) Juta Racing | (Lithuania) Arunas Geciauskas (Italy) Nicola Michelon (Switzerland) Tim Müller | Audi R8 LMS Evo II | 259 | +10 Laps |
| 10 | GT3 Am | 71 | (Lithuania) Juta Racing | (Lithuania) Arunas Geciauskas (Italy) Nicola Michelon (Switzerland) Tim Müller | Audi DAR 5.2 L V10 | 259 | +10 Laps |
| 11 DNF | 992 Am | 901 | (India) Ajith Kumar Racing by Red Ant | (Belgium) Mathieu Detry (Belgium) Fabian Duffieux (India) Ajith Kumar | Porsche 992 GT3 Cup | 256 | +13 Laps |
| 11 DNF | 992 Am | 901 | (India) Ajith Kumar Racing by Red Ant | (Belgium) Mathieu Detry (Belgium) Fabian Duffieux (India) Ajith Kumar | Porsche 4.0 L Flat-6 | 256 | +13 Laps |
| 12 | 992 Am | 949 | (Spain) Escuderia Faraon | (Spain) Pablo Bras Silvero (Spain) Pedro Miguel Lourinho Bras (Spain) Agustin Sanabria Crespo | Porsche 992 GT3 Cup | 256 | +13 Laps |
| 12 | 992 Am | 949 | (Spain) Escuderia Faraon | (Spain) Pablo Bras Silvero (Spain) Pedro Miguel Lourinho Bras (Spain) Agustin Sanabria Crespo | Porsche 4.0 L Flat-6 | 256 | +13 Laps |
| 13 DNF | 992 Am | 925 | (Netherlands) Van Berlo Motorsport by Bas Koeten Racing | (Netherlands) Glenn van Berlo (Netherlands) Marcel van Berlo (Netherlands) Bart van Helden | Porsche 992 GT3 Cup | 255 | Engine belt |
| 13 DNF | 992 Am | 925 | (Netherlands) Van Berlo Motorsport by Bas Koeten Racing | (Netherlands) Glenn van Berlo (Netherlands) Marcel van Berlo (Netherlands) Bart van Helden | Porsche 4.0 L Flat-6 | 255 | Engine belt |
| 14 | GT3 Pro/Am | 73 | (Germany) Proton Huber Competition | (Austria) Klaus Bachler (Germany) Jörg Dreisow (Germany) Manuel Lauck (Germany) Constantin Dressler | Porsche 911 GT3 R (992) | 255 | +14 Laps |
| 14 | GT3 Pro/Am | 73 | (Germany) Proton Huber Competition | (Austria) Klaus Bachler (Germany) Jörg Dreisow (Germany) Manuel Lauck (Germany) Constantin Dressler | Porsche M97/80 4.2 L Flat-6 | 255 | +14 Laps |
| 15 | GT3 Pro | 29 | (Italy) Pellin Racing | (United States) Lisa Clark (Canada) Kyle Marcelli | Ferrari 296 GT3 | 254 | +15 Laps |
| 15 | GT3 Pro | 29 | (Italy) Pellin Racing | (United States) Lisa Clark (Canada) Kyle Marcelli | Ferrari F163CE 3.0 L Turbo V6 | 254 | +15 Laps |
| 16 | GT3 Am | 2 | (Antigua and Barbuda) HAAS RT | (United Kingdom) Tom Jackson (Zimbabwe) Ameerh Naran | Audi R8 LMS Evo II | 253 | +16 Laps |
| 16 | GT3 Am | 2 | (Antigua and Barbuda) HAAS RT | (United Kingdom) Tom Jackson (Zimbabwe) Ameerh Naran | Audi DAR 5.2 L V10 | 253 | +16 Laps |
| 17 DNF | **GTX** | **701** | **(France) Vortex V8** | **(France) Lionel Amrouche** **(France) Philippe Bonnel** **(France) Cyril Calmon** | **Vortex 2.0** | **244** | **Contact** |
| 17 DNF | **GTX** | **701** | **(France) Vortex V8** | **(France) Lionel Amrouche** **(France) Philippe Bonnel** **(France) Cyril Calmon** | **Chevrolet LS3 6.2 L V8** | **244** | **Contact** |
| 18 | 992 Am | 911 | (Germany) 9und11 Racing | (Germany) Georg Goder (Germany) Ralf Oehme (Germany) Martin Schlüter (Germany) Tim Scheerbarth | Porsche 992 GT3 Cup | 242 | +27 Laps |
| 18 | 992 Am | 911 | (Germany) 9und11 Racing | (Germany) Georg Goder (Germany) Ralf Oehme (Germany) Martin Schlüter (Germany) Tim Scheerbarth | Porsche 4.0 L Flat-6 | 242 | +27 Laps |
| 19 | **GT4** | **427** | **(Germany) SRS Team Sorg Rennsport** | **(France) Thierry Chkondali** **(France) Marc Girard** **(Canada) Michel Sallenbach** | **Porsche 718 Cayman GT4 RS Clubsport** | **241** | **+28 Laps** |
| 19 | **GT4** | **427** | **(Germany) SRS Team Sorg Rennsport** | **(France) Thierry Chkondali** **(France) Marc Girard** **(Canada) Michel Sallenbach** | **Porsche MDG 4.0 L Flat-6** | **241** | **+28 Laps** |
| 20 | **TCE** | **133** | **(United Kingdom) J-Mec Engineering** | **(United Kingdom) Kevin Clarke** **(United Kingdom) James Collins** | **BMW M3 E46** | **238** | **+31 Laps** |
| 20 | **TCE** | **133** | **(United Kingdom) J-Mec Engineering** | **(United Kingdom) Kevin Clarke** **(United Kingdom) James Collins** | **BMW 3.0 L I4** | **238** | **+31 Laps** |
| 21 | GT3 Pro/Am | 8 | (Switzerland) Kessel Racing | (United Kingdom) Matt Bell (United States) Dustin Blattner (Germany) Constantin Dressler (United States) Blake McDonald | Ferrari 296 GT3 | 235 | +34 Laps |
| 21 | GT3 Pro/Am | 8 | (Switzerland) Kessel Racing | (United Kingdom) Matt Bell (United States) Dustin Blattner (Germany) Constantin Dressler (United States) Blake McDonald | Ferrari F163CE 3.0 L Turbo V6 | 235 | +34 Laps |
| 22 | GT4 | 452 | (Germany) SRS Team Sorg Rennsport | (United Kingdom) Harley Haughton (Germany) Maximilian Hill (New Zealand) Guy Stewart (Mexico) Benito Tagle | Porsche 718 Cayman GT4 RS Clubsport | 232 | +37 Laps |
| 22 | GT4 | 452 | (Germany) SRS Team Sorg Rennsport | (United Kingdom) Harley Haughton (Germany) Maximilian Hill (New Zealand) Guy Stewart (Mexico) Benito Tagle | Porsche MDG 4.0 L Flat-6 | 232 | +37 Laps |
| 23 | GTX | 702 | (France) Vortex V8 | (France) Lionel Amrouche (France) Julien Boillot (France) Alexandre De Bernardinis | Vortex 2.0 | 231 | +38 Laps |
| 23 | GTX | 702 | (France) Vortex V8 | (France) Lionel Amrouche (France) Julien Boillot (France) Alexandre De Bernardinis | Chevrolet LS3 6.2 L V8 | 231 | +38 Laps |
| 24 | GT3 Pro/Am | 81 | (United States) Era Motorsport | (United Kingdom) Jake Hill (United States) Dwight Merriman (United States) Kyle Tilley (United States) Ryan Dalziel | Ferrari 296 GT3 | 231 | +38 Laps |
| 24 | GT3 Pro/Am | 81 | (United States) Era Motorsport | (United Kingdom) Jake Hill (United States) Dwight Merriman (United States) Kyle Tilley (United States) Ryan Dalziel | Ferrari F163CE 3.0 L Turbo V6 | 231 | +38 Laps |
| 25 | TCE | 102 | (Germany) asBest Racing | (Germany) Christian Ladurner (Germany) Pia Ohlsson (Japan) Junichi Umemoto | CUPRA León TCR | 230 | +39 Laps |
| 25 | TCE | 102 | (Germany) asBest Racing | (Germany) Christian Ladurner (Germany) Pia Ohlsson (Japan) Junichi Umemoto | Volkswagen EA888 2.0 L I4 | 230 | +39 Laps |
| 26 | GT4 | 419 | (Belgium) Hamofa Motorsport | (Belgium) Kris Verhoeven (Belgium) Mark Verhoeven (Belgium) Rob Verhoeven | BMW M4 GT4 Evo (G82) | 226 | +43 Laps |
| 26 | GT4 | 419 | (Belgium) Hamofa Motorsport | (Belgium) Kris Verhoeven (Belgium) Mark Verhoeven (Belgium) Rob Verhoeven | BMW S58B30T0 3.0 L Twin-Turbo I6 | 226 | +43 Laps |
| 27 DNF | GT3 Am | 90 | (Spain) E2P Racing | (Spain) Pablo Burguera (Spain) Oliver Campos (Spain) Antonio Sainero | Aston Martin Vantage AMR GT3 Evo | 220 | +49 Laps |
| 27 DNF | GT3 Am | 90 | (Spain) E2P Racing | (Spain) Pablo Burguera (Spain) Oliver Campos (Spain) Antonio Sainero | Aston Martin M177 4.0 L Twin-Turbo V8 | 220 | +49 Laps |
| 28 DNF | GT3 Am | 69 | (United Arab Emirates) Continental Racing by Simpson Motorsport | David Pogosyan (Kyrgyzstan) Andrey Solukovtsev (Cyprus) Vasily Vladykin | Audi R8 LMS Evo II | 212 | +57 Laps |
| 28 DNF | GT3 Am | 69 | (United Arab Emirates) Continental Racing by Simpson Motorsport | David Pogosyan (Kyrgyzstan) Andrey Solukovtsev (Cyprus) Vasily Vladykin | Audi DAR 5.2 L V10 | 212 | +57 Laps |
| 29 | GTX | 111 | (Australia) 111 Racing | (Australia) Darren Currie (Australia) Geoffrey Emery (Australia) Daniel Studdard | IRC GT | 211 | +58 Laps |
| 29 | GTX | 111 | (Australia) 111 Racing | (Australia) Darren Currie (Australia) Geoffrey Emery (Australia) Daniel Studdard | GM LS3 6.2 L V8 | 211 | +58 Laps |
| 30 | GT3 Am | 21 | (Antigua and Barbuda) HAAS RT | (Belgium) Olivier Bertels (Belgium) Xavier Knauf (Belgium) Gregory Servais | Audi R8 LMS Evo II | 210 | +59 Laps |
| 30 | GT3 Am | 21 | (Antigua and Barbuda) HAAS RT | (Belgium) Olivier Bertels (Belgium) Xavier Knauf (Belgium) Gregory Servais | Audi DAR 5.2 L V10 | 210 | +59 Laps |
| 31 DNF | GT3 Pro | 93 | (Belgium) Red Ant Racing | (Belgium) Kobe de Breucker (Germany) Kenneth Heyer (Belgium) Ayrton Redant (Belgium) Yannick Redant | Mercedes-AMG GT3 Evo | 189 | +80 Laps |
| 31 DNF | GT3 Pro | 93 | (Belgium) Red Ant Racing | (Belgium) Kobe de Breucker (Germany) Kenneth Heyer (Belgium) Ayrton Redant (Belgium) Yannick Redant | Mercedes-AMG M159 6.2 L V8 | 189 | +80 Laps |
| 32 | SP4 | 4 | (Slovakia) ARC Bratislava | (Slovakia) Miro Konôpka (China) Liang Jiatong (Slovakia) Adam Konôpka (Poland) Andrzej Lewandowski | Lamborghini Huracán GT3 Evo | 151 | +118 Laps |
| 32 | SP4 | 4 | (Slovakia) ARC Bratislava | (Slovakia) Miro Konôpka (China) Liang Jiatong (Slovakia) Adam Konôpka (Poland) Andrzej Lewandowski | Lamborghini DGF 5.2 L V10 | 151 | +118 Laps |
| 33 DNF | 992 Am | 888 | (France) SebLajoux Racing | (Germany) Marlon Menden (France) Sebastien Lajoux (Netherlands) Paul Meijer (France) Stephane Perrin | Porsche 992 GT3 Cup | 143 | Accident |
| 33 DNF | 992 Am | 888 | (France) SebLajoux Racing | (Germany) Marlon Menden (France) Sebastien Lajoux (Netherlands) Paul Meijer (France) Stephane Perrin | Porsche 4.0 L Flat-6 | 143 | Accident |
| DNS | GT3 Pro | 23 | (Italy) Pellin Racing | (United States) Thor Haugen (Italy) Paolo Ruberti | Ferrari 488 GT3 Evo 2020 | 42 | Did not start |
| DNS | GT3 Pro | 23 | (Italy) Pellin Racing | (United States) Thor Haugen (Italy) Paolo Ruberti | Ferrari F154CB 3.9 L Turbo V8 | 42 | Did not start |
| DNS | GT3 Am | 44 | (Slovakia) ARC Bratislava | (Slovakia) Miro Konôpka (China) Liang Jiatong (Slovakia) Adam Konôpka (Poland) Andrzej Lewandowski | Lamborghini Huracán GT3 Evo 2 | 4 | Did not start |
| DNS | GT3 Am | 44 | (Slovakia) ARC Bratislava | (Slovakia) Miro Konôpka (China) Liang Jiatong (Slovakia) Adam Konôpka (Poland) Andrzej Lewandowski | Lamborghini DGF 5.2 L V10 | 4 | Did not start |
| DNS | 992 Pro | 918 | (Belgium) Mühlner Motorsport | (Germany) Felipe Fernández Laser (Germany) David Jahn (Germany) Nick Salewsky | Porsche 992 GT3 Cup | 0 | Accident in Part 1 |
| DNS | 992 Pro | 918 | (Belgium) Mühlner Motorsport | (Germany) Felipe Fernández Laser (Germany) David Jahn (Germany) Nick Salewsky | Porsche 4.0 L Flat-6 | 0 | Accident in Part 1 |
| DNF | GT4 | 421 | (United Kingdom) Venture Engineering | (United Kingdom) Matthew George (United Kingdom) Matthew Higgins (United Kingdom) Christopher Jones (United Kingdom) Neville Jones | Mercedes-AMG GT4 | 103 | Accident |
| DNF | GT4 | 421 | (United Kingdom) Venture Engineering | (United Kingdom) Matthew George (United Kingdom) Matthew Higgins (United Kingdom) Christopher Jones (United Kingdom) Neville Jones | Mercedes-AMG M178 4.0 L V8 | 103 | Accident |

==== Fastest lap ====
| Class | No. | Entrant | Driver | Time |
|---|---|---|---|---|
| GT3 | 193 | (Germany) Ziggo Sport - Tempesta Racing | (Netherlands) Loek Hartog | 2:16.808 |
| SP4 | 91 | (Germany) Herberth Motorsport | (Germany) Laurin Heinrich | 2:17.743 |
| GTX | 111 | (Australia) 111 Racing | (Australia) Geoffrey Emery | 2:25.798 |
| 992 | 921 | (Belgium) Mühlner Motorsport | (Germany) Julian Hanses | 2:20.533 |
| GT4 | 452 | (Germany) SRS Team Sorg Rennsport | (United Kingdom) Harley Haughton | 2:29.729 |
| TCE | 133 | (United Kingdom) J-Mec Engineering | (United Kingdom) James Collins | 2:36.615 |

24H Series
| Previous race: 12 Hours of Mugello | 2025 season | Next race: 12 Hours of Misano |
