= Scott Pruett =

American racing driver (born 1960)

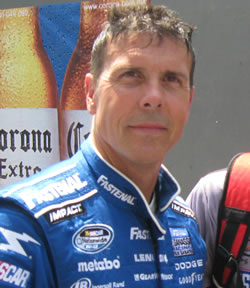
- Pruett in 2008
- Nationality: (United States) American
- Born: Scott Donald Pruett; March 24, 1960 (age 66) Roseville, California, U.S.

Championship titles
- IMSA GTO (1986, 1988); SCCA Trans-Am Series (1987, 2003); Grand-Am Daytona Prototype (2004, 2008, 2010, 2011, 2012); Major victories 24 Hours of Daytona (1994, 2007, 2008, 2011, 2013); Michigan 500 (1995); 12 Hours of Sebring (2014)

Champ Car career
- 145 races run over 10 years
- Best finish: 6th (1998)
- First race: 1988 Long Beach Grand Prix (Long Beach)
- Last race: 1999 Marlboro 500 (Fontana)
- First win: 1995 Michigan 500 (Michigan)
- Last win: 1997 Sunbelt IndyCarnival (Surfers Paradise)
| Wins | Podiums | Poles |
|---|---|---|
| 2 | 15 | 5 |

NASCAR Cup Series career
- 40 races run over 8 years
- Best finish: 37th (2000)
- First race: 2000 Daytona 500 (Daytona)
- Last race: 2008 Toyota/Save Mart 350 (Sonoma)
| Wins | Top tens | Poles |
|---|---|---|
| 0 | 6 | 0 |

NASCAR O'Reilly Auto Parts Series career
- 11 races run over 6 years
- Best finish: 76th (2000)
- First race: 2000 NAPA Auto Parts 300 (Daytona)
- Last race: 2008 NAPA Auto Parts 200 (Montreal)
| Wins | Top tens | Poles |
|---|---|---|
| 0 | 4 | 0 |

24 Hours of Le Mans career
- Years: 2001
- Teams: Corvette
- Best finish: 8th (2001)
- Class wins: 1 (2001)

Scott Donald Pruett (born March 24, 1960) is an American former racing driver who has competed in numerous disciplines of the sport. In the 1980s, Pruett established himself as a top sports car racer, winning two IMSA GTO, and three Trans-Am championships. Later in his career, he won five Grand-Am championships. In the 1990s, Pruett competed in CART Championship cars. After a brief stint in NASCAR, he returned to sports cars.

== Career ==
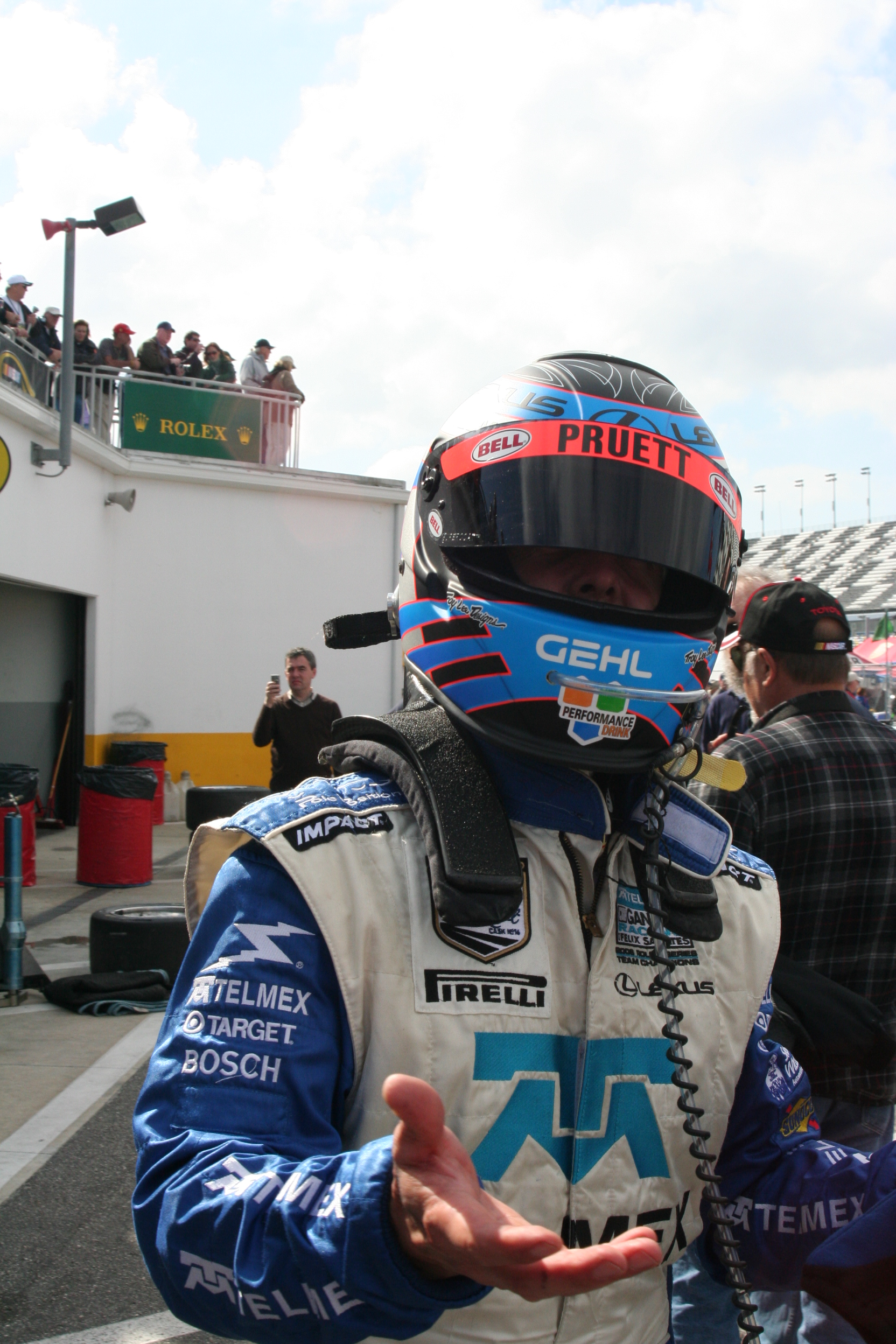
Pruett at the 2008 24 Hours of Daytona

=== 1980s ===
Pruett began racing in karts at the age of eight, eventually winning ten karting championships. In 1984, he moved to sedan racing. His first victory took place in 1986, when he won the IMSA GTO Championship, which he would again win in 1988. In 1987, Pruett won the SCCA Trans-Am championship. At the Indianapolis 500, he was the co-rookie of the year in 1989, recording his best finish in four starts in the race, tenth, driving for Truesports.

=== 1990s ===
While driving for the Truesports racing team, on March 16, 1990, during pre-season testing for the 1990 season, Pruett suffered leg and back injuries in a crash at the West Palm Beach Fairgrounds temporary circuit. Pruett spent the 1990 season recovering and on certain occasions calling ESPN IndyCar telecasts as color commentator with Paul Page doing the play by play.

Pruett won the opening round of the 1991 IROC series season at Daytona. In 1994, Pruett joined Patrick Racing as a test driver for Firestone tires. The same year, he also won the IMSA 24 Hours at Daytona, and also won a second Trans-Am Series championship.

For the next four years, Pruett continued driving Indy Cars for Patrick Racing and usually made the top ten in the series championship. In 1995, he was in contention for the Indianapolis 500 until crashing late, with eighteen laps to go. He won his first CART race at the Michigan 500 after a late race duel with Al Unser Jr., beating Unser Jr. by .56 seconds. His best championship finish with Patrick was in 1998, finishing sixth in points with three podium finishes and one pole position.

In 1999, Pruett changed to Arciero-Wells and participated in the Toyota engine-program development. He also earned Toyota's first pole on an oval (California Speedway) and earned Toyota's best qualifying effort on a road course at the current time (third at the Australian Grand Prix).

=== 2000s ===
In 2000, Pruett raced the No. 32 Tide-sponsored Ford for Cal Wells in the Winston Cup Series. Replaced by Ricky Craven after the season, he briefly retired from NASCAR, but returned in 2001 to win the 24 Hours of Le Mans LMGTS Class in a factory Chevrolet Corvette C5-R. The following year, he won the GTS class in the 24 Hours at Daytona and also joined Speed as a reporter. For them he covered the 2002 FedEx Championship Series as well as the Champ Car World Series in 2003. This year, Pruett also won the Trans-Am Championships in the Motorock Trans-Am Series for Rocketsports Racing.

In 2001,Pruett made a number of NASCAR starts as a "road-course ringer," both in the Winston Cup Series and the Busch Series. For the Cup Series, he drove at Sonoma for Andy Petree and then at Watkins Glen for Chip Ganassi. For the Busch Series, Pruett drove one single race in place of Kevin Lepage at Watkins Glen in what Pruett felt was "likely his best chance to win, perhaps in his career." With Lepage's car, Pruett won the pole position and dominated early on before falling back to finish eighth. Fellow ringer Ron Fellows took the win.

In 2002, at Watkins Glen, Pruett replaced Jimmy Spencer in the No. 41 car for a one-race deal. Pruett started 19th and spent most of the race in the top 10. He finished sixth after getting an opportunity to steal a win from winner Tony Stewart. The next year in 2003, Pruett drove the No. 39 Ganassi car for Sonoma and Watkins Glen. At the Glen, Pruett finished second, his career-best finish. Pruett had almost pulled off the victory by taking advantage of cautions to climb through the field, leading nine laps in the process. However, that was the year that Robby Gordon swept the road courses and, as a result, Pruett never mounted a significant challenge against Gordon for the win.

In 2004, Pruett was scheduled to run three races driving the No. 39 Target-sponsored Dodge for Chip Ganassi Racing and the No. 09 for James Finch. At Sonoma, Pruett spent all his time in the top-ten, leading one lap and nearly winning, but finishing in third spot behind his teammate Jamie McMurray. Pruett was the only road ringer to lead laps in that race. At Indianapolis, Pruett found his No. 09 Dodge losing an engine and his race finishing in an abrupt end. At Watkins Glen, Pruett did not qualify after qualifying was rained out. At Sonoma in 2005, Pruett ran some of the race in the top-ten but crashed late in the race. At Watkins Glen later that year, Pruett originally did not qualify the No. 39 car due to rain. However, he ran the 2005 Sirius at the Glen in the No. 40 Coors car for Ganassi after Sterling Marlin left the race to attend his father's funeral. Starting 43rd due to the driver change, Pruett charged through the field to finish 4th after briefly contending for the win.

In 2006, Pruett returned to the Busch series in the No. 1 car for James Finch. Pruett had a promising race at Watkins Glen during the Zippo 200, starting second and finishing tenth. He drove the No. 40 car for the road-course races in Cup as well. Pruett managed to take advantage of a last-lap crash to charge from twelfth place to finish sixth during the final lap of the AMD at the Glen.

In 2007, Pruett won the overall race and Daytona Prototype in the Rolex 24 at Daytona, with Juan Pablo Montoya and Salvador Durán in the No. 01 Telmex, Target, Lexus Riley for Chip Ganassi Racing. Later that same year he nearly won his first Nationwide Series victory at the Telcel-Motorola Mexico 200 at the Mexico City road course only to lose it in the closing laps when his Chip Ganassi teammate the aforementioned Juan Pablo Montoya spun him out and Montoya would win his first NASCAR race. Pruett would recover to a fifth-place finish, his best Nationwide finish at that time. After the race however Pruett was none too pleased with his teammate stating, "that was...nasty, dirty driving".

Later at Montreal in 2007, Pruett had a promising run and was in third spot on a restart with three laps left. In the first turn a hard-charging Kevin Harvick slammed into the back of Pruett who spun and collected Ron Fellows, Ron Hornaday Jr., Jeff Burton, Brad Coleman, and Scott Wimmer. Pruett recovered from the spin and was running fourth on the final lap but ran out of gas, finishing fourteenth after leading nine laps. To add insult to injury, Harvick won the race.

The next week at Watkins Glen, Pruett was running third with less than thirty laps to go and got a speeding penalty on pit road. After slipping to 33rd after the penalty, Pruett spent the rest of the race charging back towards the lead. Pruett was running 11th on the final lap but got spun out by fellow road racer Ron Fellows, throwing both of them into the final-turn gravel trap. Pruett recovered for an 18th-place finish while Fellows finished 24th.

The year 2008 was very successful for Pruett. He drove the No. 40 Fastenal-sponsored Dodge Charger for Chip Ganassi again in the NNS series sharing the ride with close friend Dario Franchitti who was trying out the NASCAR series. Pruett dominated the Mexico City Nationwide series event, but lost the lead with eight laps to go during a battle with Kyle Busch. Pruett finished third - his career-best finish in the Nationwide series. In qualifying the NAPA Auto Parts 200 at Montreal, Pruett claimed the pole. The 2008 NAPA 200 in Montreal is his last career start in the NASCAR Xfinity series.

Pruett won the overall race and in the Daytona Prototype Class at the 2008 Porsche 250 at Barber Motorsports Park and also the Rolex Sports Car Series Daytona Prototype season championship. In the Daytona Prototype Class at the Mexico City 250 he made the second place overall. Moreover, Pruett won the closest finish in the history of Grand-Am at the time, beating Alex Gurney in the finish to the 2008 Brumos Porsche 250 held at Daytona International Speedway by 0.081 seconds, after 145 minutes of racing.

=== 2010s ===
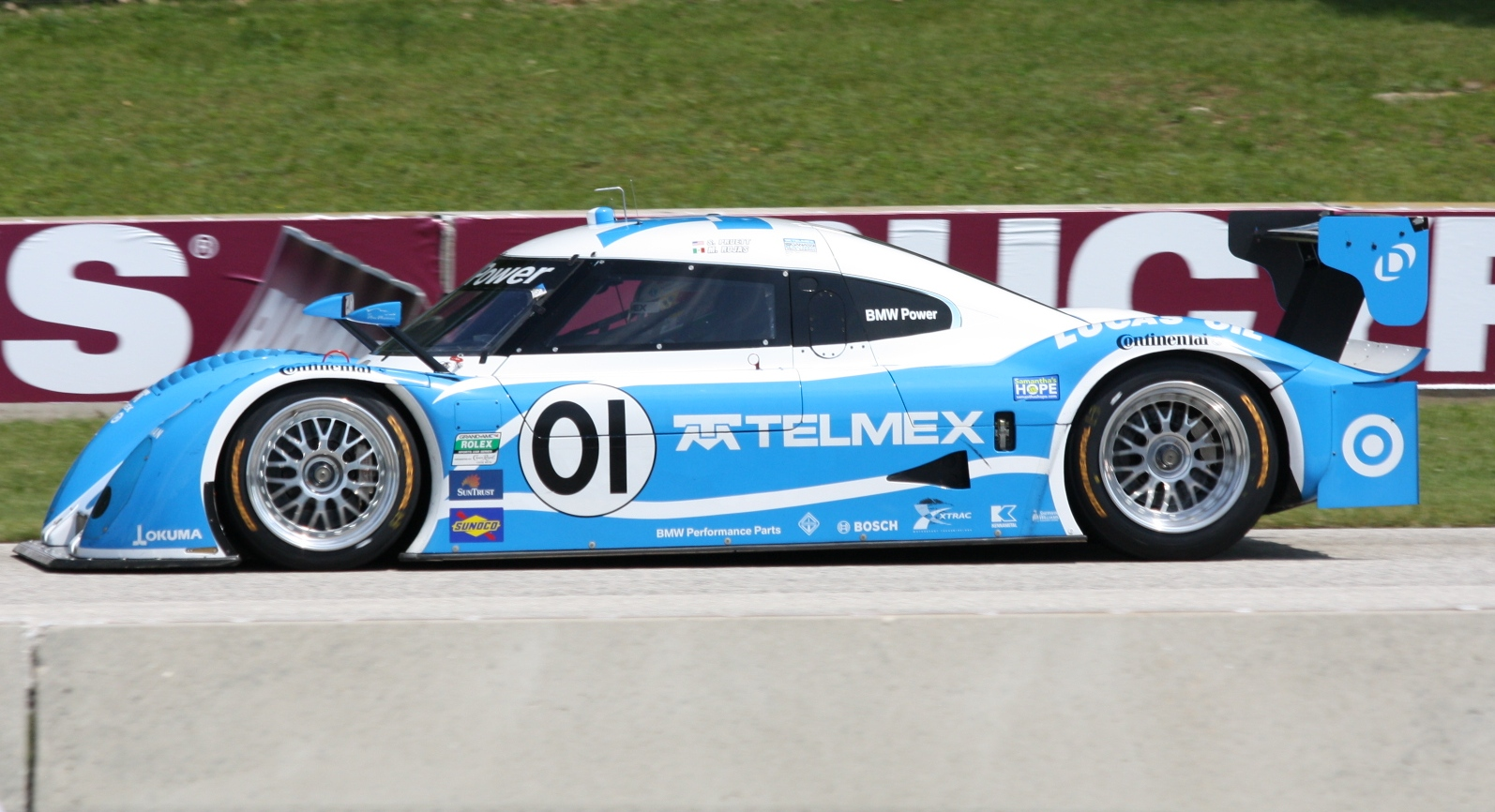
Pruett / Memo Rojas' 2011 Daytona Prototype

Pruett was racing for Chip Ganassi in the Grand-Am Series during the 2010 season. In July, Hendrick Motorsports chose him as a standby driver should Jeff Gordon have to miss Watkins Glen due to the birth of his son. Gordon wound up driving the race. Pruett, combined with Memo Rojas, won nine of twelve races to win another Grand-Am Rolex Championship. The nine victories was a series record.

In 2011, Pruett won the 24 Hours of Daytona, his fourth overall victory in the event. In 2012, Pruett was one of the commentators for Speed Channel's coverage of the 24 Hours of Le Mans.

Pruett once again led Ganassi Racing to their third Rolex Series Championship in-a-row with Co-driver Memo Rojas. The team put the No. 01 Telmex BMW Riley on the podium for nine out of fourteen races, top five for ten out of fourteen races with only two wins on the season, besting second place Ryan Dalziel by twelve points. This year's results mark Ganassi's fourth title in five years, and Pruett's fifth Rolex title.

In 2013, Pruett opened on a strong note, winning the 51st Rolex 24 at Daytona with co-drivers Memo Rojas, Juan Pablo Montoya, and Charlie Kimball. 2013 marked his fifth win at the annual endurance race, tying the legendary Hurley Haywood for most victories in the grueling twice around the clock race. Despite some serious set-backs during the 2013 season, including accruing no points at Detroit, the Championship came down to the last race, with the No. 01 Ganassi Team taking the Team Title, but Jordan Taylor and Max Angelelli taking the Driver's Title under Wayne Taylor Racing/Velocity Worldwide, with Pruett and Rojas taking second place in the Driver's Standings.

In 2014, Pruett competed in the Tudor United SportsCar Championship for a full season with longtime co-driver Memo Rojas in the Prototype Class.

In 2015, Joey Hand joined Pruett in the No. 01 for the full season. The team saw some very disappointing results early in the year due to the aging Riley chassis being outclassed by the Corvette Daytona Prototype. However, despite not having won a race until late in the season, the No. 01 had remained consistent enough to be in the championship battle by the last race of the season Petit Le Mans. By the end of the rain-shortened race only eight points separated the top-four teams with CGR taking the top spot.

Pruett departed CGR in 2016 and joined with Paul Gentilozzi, who fielded two Lexus RC F GT3's in the WeatherTech SportsCar Championship. He raced for the 3GT team led by Paul Gentilozzi for a full season. He later announced that he would be driving for Action Express Racing part-time for the season.

== Retirement ==
On January 5, 2018, Pruett announced his retirement after fifty years in racing, following the 2018 Rolex 24 at Daytona.

== Broadcast work ==
Pruett worked for several years as a commentator for Champ Car races on the former Speed Channel. He is well known for his trackside interviews, frequently interjecting the greeting "Hi to my family at home" mid-sentence when answering a question. On January 26, 2017, he was named to the Motorsports Hall of Fame of America.

== Personal life ==
Pruett and his wife have also opened Pruett Vineyards in Northern California. In November 2012, their Lucky Lauren Red was given a score of 93 points from Wine Spectator.

In 2021, Pruett returned to Chip Ganassi Racing as the strategist for IndyCar rookie and seven-time NASCAR Cup champion Jimmie Johnson.

In 2025, Pruett was inducted into the Trans-Am Series Hall of Fame as part of the inaugural class.

== Motorsports career results ==
=== 12 Hours of Sebring results ===
| Year | Team | Co-drivers | Car | Class | Laps | Pos. | Class pos. |
|---|---|---|---|---|---|---|---|
| 1985 | (United States) Mike Meyer/Daffy | (United States) Paul Lewis (United States) Joe Varde | Mazda RX-7 | GTU | 117 | DNF | DNF |
| 1986 | (United States) Roush Racing | (United States) Caitlyn Jenner | Ford Mustang | GTO | 265 | 4th | **1st** |
| 1987 | (United States) Roush Racing | (United States) Pete Halsmer | Ford Mustang GTX Special | GTP | 179 | 39th | 7th |
| 1988 | (United States) Roush Racing | (United States) Pete Halsmer | Merkur XR4Ti | GTO | 275 | 11th | 4th |
| 1993 | (United States) Rocketsports | (United States) Darin Brassfield | Oldsmobile Cutlass | GTS | 213 | 10th | 4th |
| 1994 | (United States) Brix Racing | (United States) Price Cobb (United States) Tommy Riggins | Oldsmobile Cutlass Supreme | GTS | 190 | DNF | DNF |
| 2014 | (United States) Chip Ganassi Racing | (Mexico) Memo Rojas (United Kingdom) Marino Franchitti | Riley Mk.XXVI-Ford | P | 291 | **1st** | **1st** |
| 2015 | (United States) Chip Ganassi Racing | (United States) Joey Hand (New Zealand) Scott Dixon | Riley Mk.XXVI-Ford | P | 340 | 4th | 4th |
| 2016 | (United States) Action Express Racing | (United States) Dane Cameron (United States) Eric Curran | Coyote Corvette DP | P | 238 | **2nd** | **2nd** |
| 2017 | (United States) 3GT Racing | (United States) Sage Karam (United Kingdom) Ian James | Lexus RC F GT3 | GTD | 269 | 35th | 18th |

=== American open-wheel racing results ===
(key)

==== CART ====
| Year | Team | No. | Chassis | Engine | 1 | 2 | 3 | 4 | 5 | 6 | 7 | 8 | 9 | 10 | 11 | 12 | 13 | 14 | 15 | 16 | 17 | 18 | 19 | 20 | Pos. | Pts | Ref |
|---|---|---|---|---|---|---|---|---|---|---|---|---|---|---|---|---|---|---|---|---|---|---|---|---|---|---|---|
| 1988 | Dick Simon Racing | 22 | Lola T88/00 | Cosworth DFX V8t | PHX | LBH; 18 | INDY | MIL | POR | CLE | TOR | | | | | | | | | | | | | | 38th | 0 | |
| 1988 | Machinists Union Racing | 11 | March 88C | Cosworth DFX V8t | | | | | | | | MEA; 16 | MCH | POC | | | | | | | | | | | 38th | 0 | |
| 1988 | Machinists Union Racing | 11 | March 87C | Cosworth DFX V8t | | | | | | | | | | | MDO; 20 | ROA | NAZ | LAG | MIA | | | | | | 38th | 0 | |
| 1989 | TrueSports | 3 | Lola T89/00 | Judd AV V8t | PHX; 11 | LBH; DNS | INDY; 10 | MIL; 5 | DET; 2 | POR; 5 | CLE; 6 | MEA; 3 | TOR; 6 | MCH; 17 | POC; 8 | MDO; 19 | ROA; 8 | NAZ; 6 | LAG; 4 | | | | | | 8th | 101 | |
| 1991 | TrueSports | 11 | TrueSport 91C | Judd AV V8t | SRF; 5 | LBH; 24 | PHX; 12 | INDY; 12 | MIL; 13 | DET; 17 | POR; 8 | CLE; 23 | MEA; 17 | TOR; 4 | MCH; 13 | DEN; 5 | VAN; 5 | MDO; 4 | ROA; 17 | NAZ; 18 | LAG; 7 | | | | 10th | 67 | |
| 1992 | TrueSports | 10 | TrueSport 92C | Chevrolet 265A V8t | SRF; 18 | PHX; 7 | LBH; 9 | INDY; 30 | DET; 19 | POR; 10 | MIL; 11 | NHA; 6 | TOR; 25 | MCH; 5 | CLE; 7 | ROA; 9 | VAN; 4 | MDO; 9 | NAZ; 10 | LAG; 14 | | | | | 11th | 62 | |
| 1993 | ProFormance Motorsports | 45 | Lola T91/00 | Chevrolet 265A V8t | SRF | PHX; 7 | LBH; 7 | INDY; DNQ | MIL | DET; 25 | POR | CLE | TOR; 26 | MCH | NHA | ROA | VAN | MDO; 15 | NAZ | LAG; 25 | | | | | 19th | 12 | |
| 1995 | Patrick Racing | 20 | Lola T95/00 | Ford XB V8t | MIA; 4 | SRF; 3 | PHX; 9 | LBH; 2 | NAZ; 8 | INDY; 19 | MIL; 12 | DET; 3 | POR; 13 | ROA; 7 | TOR; 25 | CLE; 16 | MCH; 1 | MDO; 11 | NHA; 24 | VAN; 6 | LAG; 5 | | | | 7th | 112 | |
| 1996 | Patrick Racing | 20 | Lola T96/00 | Ford XD V8t | MIA; 4 | RIO; 3 | SRF; 2 | LBH; 11 | NAZ; 8 | 500; 26 | MIL; 12 | **DET**; 10 | POR; 23 | CLE; 8 | TOR; 10 | MCH; 13 | MDO; 21 | ROA; 7 | VAN; 20 | LAG; 3 | | | | | 10th | 82 | |
| 1997 | Patrick Racing | 20 | Reynard 97i | Ford XB V8t | MIA; 5 | SRF; 1 | LBH; 3 | NAZ; 10 | RIO; 3 | GAT; 19 | MIL; 9 | DET; 24 | **POR**; 17 | CLE; 8 | TOR; 5 | **MCH**; 14 | MDO; 9 | ROA; 5 | VAN; 18 | LAG; 16 | FON; 7 | | | | 9th | 102 | |
| 1998 | Patrick Racing | 20 | Reynard 98i | Ford XB V8t | MIA; 5 | MOT; 21 | | | RIO; 18 | GAT; 5 | | DET; 9 | POR; 2 | | | MCH; 4 | MDO; 2 | | | | | | | | 6th | 121 | |
| 1998 | Patrick Racing | 20 | Reynard 97i | Ford XB V8t | | | LBH; 12 | NAZ; 22 | | | MIL; 10 | | | CLE; 4 | TOR; 6 | | | ROA; 20 | VAN; 3 | LAG; 18 | HOU; 11 | SRF; 4 | **FON**; 20 | | 6th | 121 | |
| 1999 | Arciero-Wells Racing | 24 | Reynard 99i | Toyota RV8D V8t | MIA; 22 | MOT; 21 | LBH; 15 | NAZ; 10 | RIO; 24 | GAT; 14 | MIL; 17 | POR; 24 | CLE; 17 | ROA; 25 | TOR; 7 | MCH; 14 | DET; 8 | MDO; 17 | CHI; 20 | VAN; 13 | LAG; 7 | HOU; 10 | SRF; 9 | **FON**; 22 | 19th | 28 | |

==== Indianapolis 500 ====
| Year | Chassis | Engine | Start | Finish | Team |
|---|---|---|---|---|---|
| 1989 | Lola T89/00 | Judd | 17 | 10 | TrueSports |
| 1991 | Truesports 91C | Judd | 27 | 12 | TrueSports |
| 1992 | Truesports 92C | Chevrolet | 17 | 30 | TrueSports |
| 1993 | Lola T91/00 | Chevrolet | DNQ | | ProFormance Motorsports |
| 1995 | Lola T95/00 | Ford | 8 | 19 | Patrick Racing |

=== NASCAR ===
(key) (Bold – Pole position awarded by qualifying time. Italics – Pole position earned by points standings or practice time. * – Most laps led.)

==== Sprint Cup Series ====
NASCAR Sprint Cup Series results
| Year | Team | No. | Make | 1 | 2 | 3 | 4 | 5 | 6 | 7 | 8 | 9 | 10 | 11 | 12 | 13 | 14 | 15 | 16 | 17 | 18 | 19 | 20 | 21 | 22 | 23 | 24 | 25 | 26 | 27 | 28 | 29 | 30 | 31 | 32 | 33 | 34 | 35 | 36 | NSCC | Pts | Ref |
|---|---|---|---|---|---|---|---|---|---|---|---|---|---|---|---|---|---|---|---|---|---|---|---|---|---|---|---|---|---|---|---|---|---|---|---|---|---|---|---|---|---|---|
| 2000 | PPI Motorsports | 32 | Ford | DAY; 19 | CAR; DNQ | LVS; 42 | ATL; 41 | DAR; DNQ | BRI; DNQ | TEX; 27 | MAR; 32 | TAL; 20 | CAL; 34 | RCH; 27 | CLT; 41 | DOV; 38 | MCH; 19 | POC; 31 | SON; 39 | DAY; 40 | NHA; 30 | POC; 36 | IND; 10 | GLN; DNQ | MCH; 17 | BRI; 38 | DAR; 24 | RCH; 16 | NHA; 41 | DOV; 42 | MAR; DNQ | CLT; DNQ | TAL; 39 | CAR; 30 | PHO; 34 | HOM; 43 | ATL; 32 | | | 37th | 1929 | |
| 2001 | Andy Petree Racing | 33 | Chevy | DAY | CAR | LVS | ATL | DAR | BRI | TEX | MAR | TAL | CAL | RCH | CLT | DOV | MCH | POC | SON; 12 | DAY | CHI | NHA | POC | IND | | | | | | | | | | | | | | | | 51st | 262 | |
| 2001 | Chip Ganassi Racing | 01 | Dodge | | | | | | | | | | | | | | | | | | | | | | GLN; 11 | MCH | BRI | DAR | RCH | DOV | KAN | CLT | MAR | TAL | PHO | CAR | HOM | ATL | NHA | 51st | 262 | |
| 2002 | Chip Ganassi Racing | 41 | Dodge | DAY | CAR | LVS | ATL | DAR | BRI | TEX | MAR | TAL | CAL | RCH | CLT | DOV | POC | MCH | SON | DAY | CHI | NHA | POC | IND | GLN; 6 | MCH | BRI | DAR | RCH | NHA | DOV | KAN | TAL | CLT | MAR | ATL | CAR | PHO | HOM | 61st | 150 | |
| 2003 | Phoenix Racing | 09 | Dodge | DAY | CAR | LVS | ATL | DAR | BRI | TEX | TAL | MAR | CAL | RCH | CLT | DOV | POC | MCH | SON; 34 | DAY | CHI | NHA | POC | IND | | | | | | | | | | | | | | | | 53rd | 236 | |
| 2003 | Chip Ganassi Racing | 39 | Dodge | | | | | | | | | | | | | | | | | | | | | | GLN; 2 | MCH | BRI | DAR | RCH | NHA | DOV | TAL | KAN | CLT | MAR | ATL | PHO | CAR | HOM | 53rd | 236 | |
| 2004 | Chip Ganassi Racing | 39 | Dodge | DAY | CAR | LVS | ATL | DAR | BRI | TEX | MAR | TAL | CAL | RCH | CLT | DOV | POC | MCH | SON; 3 | DAY | CHI | NHA | POC | | GLN; DNQ | MCH | BRI | CAL | RCH | NHA | DOV | TAL | KAN | CLT | MAR | ATL | PHO | DAR | HOM | 64th | 207 | |
| 2004 | Phoenix Racing | 09 | Dodge | | | | | | | | | | | | | | | | | | | | | IND; 42 | | | | | | | | | | | | | | | | 64th | 207 | |
| 2005 | Chip Ganassi Racing | 39 | Dodge | DAY | CAL | LVS | ATL | BRI | MAR | TEX | PHO | TAL | DAR | RCH | CLT | DOV | POC | MCH | SON; 31 | DAY | CHI | NHA | POC | IND | GLN; DNQ | | | | | | | | | | | | | | | 58th | 230 | |
| 2005 | Chip Ganassi Racing | 40 | Dodge | | | | | | | | | | | | | | | | | | | | | | GLN; 4 | MCH | BRI | CAL | RCH | NHA | DOV | TAL | KAN | CLT | MAR | ATL | TEX | PHO | HOM | 58th | 230 | |
| 2006 | Chip Ganassi Racing | 40 | Dodge | DAY | CAL | LVS | ATL | BRI | MAR | TEX | PHO | TAL | RCH | DAR | CLT | DOV | POC | MCH | SON; 30 | DAY | CHI | NHA | POC | IND | GLN; 6 | MCH | BRI | CAL | RCH | NHA | DOV | KAN | TAL | CLT | MAR | ATL | TEX | PHO | HOM | 55th | 223 | |
| 2008 | Chip Ganassi Racing | 41 | Dodge | DAY | CAL | LVS | ATL | BRI | MAR | TEX | PHO | TAL | RCH | DAR | CLT | DOV | POC | MCH | SON; 38 | NHA | DAY | CHI | IND | POC | GLN | MCH | BRI | CAL | RCH | NHA | DOV | KAN | TAL | CLT | MAR | ATL | TEX | PHO | HOM | 68th | 49 | |

===== Daytona 500 =====
| Year | Team | Manufacturer | Start | Finish |
|---|---|---|---|---|
| 2000 | PPI Motorsports | Ford | 15 | 19 |

==== Nationwide Series ====
NASCAR Nationwide Series results
| Year | Team | No. | Make | 1 | 2 | 3 | 4 | 5 | 6 | 7 | 8 | 9 | 10 | 11 | 12 | 13 | 14 | 15 | 16 | 17 | 18 | 19 | 20 | 21 | 22 | 23 | 24 | 25 | 26 | 27 | 28 | 29 | 30 | 31 | 32 | 33 | 34 | 35 | NNSC | Pts | Ref |
|---|---|---|---|---|---|---|---|---|---|---|---|---|---|---|---|---|---|---|---|---|---|---|---|---|---|---|---|---|---|---|---|---|---|---|---|---|---|---|---|---|---|
| 2000 | PPI Motorsports | 97 | Ford | DAY; 15 | CAR | LVS | ATL | DAR | BRI | TEX | NSV | TAL | CAL | RCH | NHA | CLT | DOV; 43 | SBO | MYB | GLN | MLW | NZH | PPR | GTY | IRP | MCH | BRI | DAR; 18 | RCH | DOV | CLT | CAR | MEM | PHO | HOM | | | | 76th | 261 | |
| 2001 | Matrix Motorsports | 71 | Ford | DAY | CAR | LVS | ATL | DAR | BRI | TEX | NSH | TAL | CAL | RCH | NHA | NZH | CLT | DOV | KEN | MLW | **GLN**; 8 | CHI | GTY | PPR | IRP | MCH | BRI | DAR | RCH | DOV | KAN | CLT | MEM | PHO | CAR | HOM | | | 92nd | 147 | |
| 2005 | Biagi-DenBeste Racing | 4 | Dodge | DAY | CAL | MXC | LVS | ATL | NSH | BRI | TEX | PHO | TAL | DAR | RCH | CLT | DOV | NSH | KEN | MLW | DAY | CHI | NHA | PPR | GTY | IRP | GLN; 14 | MCH | BRI | CAL | RCH | DOV | KAN | CLT | MEM | TEX | PHO | HOM | 121st | 103 | |
| 2006 | Phoenix Racing | 1 | Dodge | DAY | CAL | MXC | LVS | ATL | BRI | TEX | NSH | PHO | TAL | RCH | DAR | CLT | DOV | NSH | KEN | MLW | DAY | CHI | NHA | MAR | GTY | IRP | GLN; 10 | MCH | BRI | CAL | RCH | DOV | KAN | CLT | MEM | TEX | PHO | HOM | 104th | 134 | |
| 2007 | Chip Ganassi Racing | 41 | Dodge | DAY | CAL | **MXC**; 5 | LVS | ATL | BRI | NSH | TEX | PHO | TAL | RCH | DAR | CLT | DOV | NSH | KEN | MLW | NHA | DAY | CHI | GTY | IRP | CGV; 14 | GLN; 18 | MCH | BRI | CAL | RCH | DOV | KAN | CLT | MEM | TEX | PHO | HOM | 81st | 395 | |
| 2008 | Chip Ganassi Racing | 40 | Dodge | DAY | CAL | LVS | ATL | BRI | NSH | TEX | PHO | MXC; 3 | TAL | RCH | DAR | CLT | DOV | NSH | KEN | MLW | NHA | DAY | CHI | GTY | IRP | **CGV**; 22 | GLN | MCH | BRI | CAL | RCH | DOV | KAN | CLT | MEM | TEX | PHO | HOM | 79th | 277 | |

=== 24 Hours of Le Mans results ===
| Year | Team | Co-drivers | Car | Class | Laps | Pos. | Class pos. |
|---|---|---|---|---|---|---|---|
| 2001 | (United States) Corvette Racing | (Canada) Ron Fellows (United States) Johnny O'Connell | Chevrolet Corvette C5-R | GTS | 278 | 8th | **1st** |

=== Supercars Championship results ===
(key) (Races in bold indicate pole position) (Races in italics indicate fastest lap)

| Year | Team | No. | Car | 1 | 2 | 3 | 4 | 5 | 6 | 7 | 8 | 9 | 10 | 11 | 12 | 13 | 14 | 15 | 16 | 17 | 18 | 19 | 20 | 21 | 22 | 23 | 24 | 25 | 26 | 27 | Pos. | Pts |
|---|---|---|---|---|---|---|---|---|---|---|---|---|---|---|---|---|---|---|---|---|---|---|---|---|---|---|---|---|---|---|---|---|
| 2010 | Lucas Dumbrell Motorsport | 30 | Holden VE Commodore | YMC; R1 | YMC; R2 | BHR; R3 | BHR; R4 | ADE; R5 | ADE; R6 | HAM; R7 | HAM; R8 | QLD; R9 | QLD; R10 | WIN; R11 | WIN; R12 | HDV; R13 | HDV; R14 | TOW; R15 | TOW; R16 | PHI; Q | PHI; R17 | BAT; R18 | SUR; R19; Ret | SUR; R20; Ret | SYM; R21 | SYM; R22 | SAN; R23 | SAN; R24 | SYD; R25 | SYD; R26 | NC | 0 |

=== Complete IMSA SportsCar Championship results ===
(key)(Races in bold indicate pole position, Results are overall/class)

| Year | Team | Class | Make | Engine | 1 | 2 | 3 | 4 | 5 | 6 | 7 | 8 | 9 | 10 | 11 | 12 | Rank | Points |
|---|---|---|---|---|---|---|---|---|---|---|---|---|---|---|---|---|---|---|
| 2014 | Chip Ganassi Racing | P | Ford EcoBoost Riley DP | Ford Ecoboost 3.5 L V6 Turbo | DAY; 11 | SEB; 1 | LBH; 1 | LGA; 3 | DET; 11 | WGL; 8 | MOS; 9 | IMS; 2 | ELK; 7 | COA; 1 | PET; 3 | | 4th | 317 |
| 2015 | Chip Ganassi Racing | P | Ford EcoBoost Riley DP | Ford Ecoboost 3.5 L V6 Turbo | DAY; 6 | SIR; 4 | LBH; 2 | LS; 7 | BEL; 4 | WGL; 2 | MSP; 6 | ELK; 3 | AUS; 1 | PET; 2 | | | 4th | 301 |
| 2016 | Action Express Racing | P | Coyote Corvette DP | Chevrolet 5.5L V8 | DAY; 4 | SEB; 2 | LBH | LGA | BEL | WGL | MOS | ELK | AUS | PET | | | 21st | 62 |
| 2017 | 3GT Racing | GTD | Lexus RC F GT3 | Lexus 5.4 L V8 | DAY; 27 | SEB; 18 | LBH; 6 | AUS; 9 | DET; 6 | WGL; 6 | MOS; 5 | LIM; 12 | ELK; 10 | VIR; 13 | LGA; 13 | PET; 8 | 16th | 240 |
| 2018 | 3GT Racing | GTD | Lexus RC F GT3 | Lexus 5.4 L V8 | DAY; 9 | SEB | MOH | BEL | WGL | MOS | LIM | ELK | VIR | LGA | PET | | 55th | 22 |

Sporting positions
| Preceded by Terry Borcheller | Grand-Am Daytona Prototype Champion; 2004 with Max Papis | Succeeded by Max Angelelli; Wayne Taylor |
| Preceded by Jon Fogarty; Alex Gurney | Grand-Am Daytona Prototype Champion; 2008 with Memo Rojas | Succeeded by Jon Fogarty; Alex Gurney |
| Preceded by Jon Fogarty; Alex Gurney | Grand-Am Daytona Prototype Champion; 2010, 2011, 2012 with Memo Rojas | Succeeded by Jordan Taylor; Max Angelelli |
Achievements
| Preceded by Bill Vukovich III | Indianapolis 500 Rookie of the Year; 1989 with Bernard Jourdain | Succeeded by Eddie Cheever |
