= Ford Mustang GTP =

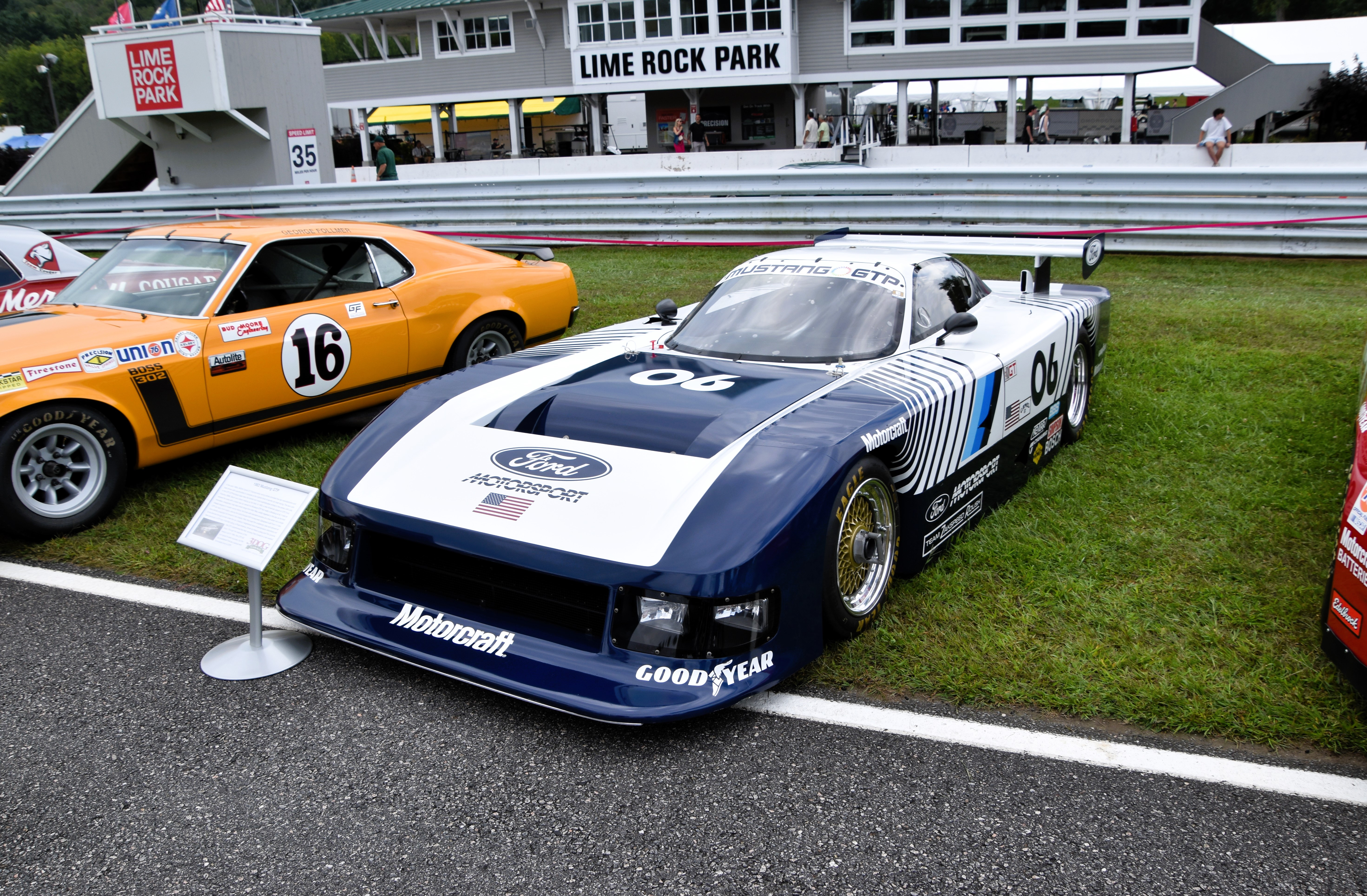
- The No. 06 Mustang GTP on display in 2024
- Category: IMSA GTP
- Constructor: Ford
- Designer: Bob Riley
- Predecessor: Ford Mustang GTX
- Successor: Zakspeed: Ford Mustang Probe; Roush: Ford Mustang Maxum GTP

Technical specifications
- Chassis: Carbon fibre and Nomex composite monocoque chassis, reinforced with Kevlar in key areas
- Suspension (front): Double wishbones with Koni coil-over springs, and adjustable sway bars
- Suspension (rear): Double wishbones with Koni coil-over springs, and adjustable sway bars
- Length: 189 in (4,801 mm)
- Width: 78 in (1,981 mm)
- Height: 42 in (1,067 mm)
- Axle track: Front: 64 in (1,626 mm); Rear: 61 in (1,549 mm)
- Wheelbase: 105 in (2,667 mm)
- Engine: Cosworth BDA 1,745 cc (106.5 cu in) 16 valve, DOHC I4, turbocharged, front engined, longitudinally mounted
- Transmission: Hewland VG5 5-speed manual
- Weight: 1,770 lb (803 kg)
- Tyres: Goodyear

Competition history
- Notable entrants: Zakspeed Roush; Team Zakspeed USA
- Debut: 1983 Road America 500
Races	Wins
14 (15 entries)	1
- Teams' Championships: 0
- Constructors' Championships: 0
- Drivers' Championships: 0

The Ford Mustang GTP was an American race car constructed to compete in the IMSA GTP series by Ford in 1983, based on the "Fox-Body" generation of the Ford Mustang road car. In 1983 the engine was a 1.7 liter twin turbo supplied by Zakspeed. In 1984 it used a destroked 2.1-litre 16 valve turbocharged variant of the 2.3 litre Ford Lima engine, capable of producing around 600 hp (447 kW; 608 PS). The 2.1 litre engine is often misidentified as more common 2.1 litre variant of the BDA. Contrary to convention for an IMSA GTP car, the engine was fitted in the front of the car. Zakspeed would replace the car with the Ford Mustang Probe for 1985, while Roush Performance would build the no more successful V8-powered Ford Mustang Maxum GTP in 1987.

== Design and development ==
In 1983, the GTX class of the IMSA GT Championship became obsolete, and was replaced by the IMSA GTP category. As a result, Ford needed a new car, as their Ford Mustang GTX was no longer eligible for competition. Bob Riley was selected to design the car, which, somewhat unusually, was front engined. It was designed around a 2.1-litre turbocharged variant of the Ford Lima engine, equipped with a special 16 valve head, and was capable of producing around 600 hp (447 kW; 608 PS). Roush Performance, Protofab and the Ford Aerospace Western Development Labs division built the chassis and bodywork, which consisted of carbon fibre panels bonded to a carbon fibre and Nomex composite monocoque chassis, which was reinforced with Kevlar in key areas. The car's aerodynamics were configured to maximize the downforce generated by ground effects, although the suspension was fairly conventional; double wishbones with KONI coil-over springs, and adjustable sway bars at both ends of the car. Ford's chairman, Philip Caldwell, was positive about the car's development, stating that he felt it was "a clear edge of technological development." The car used a fairly conventional Hewland five-speed manual transmission to transmit the power, and it weighed approximately 1,770 lb (803 kg). Three cars were built as part of the program.

== Racing history ==
=== 1983 ===
The cars were not ready until the 15th round of the IMSA GT Championship, which was the Road America 500, where two cars were entered by Zakspeed Roush; the 2.1-litre engines were not ready yet, so the team ran the 1.7-litre version of the BDA turbo instead. Tim Coconis and Klaus Ludwig drove one car, while Bobby Rahal and Geoff Brabham drove the other. The debut was a successful one; Coconis and Ludwig won the race by two laps, while Rahal and Brabham took third overall, and second in the GTP category. The Grand Prix of Pocono, however, would turn out to be very different, as Ludwig's car lasted just eight laps before retiring, and the Brabham-Ludwig car retired after 49 laps; this saw them classified 42nd and 35th overall, and eighth and tenth in class, respectively. The cracks in the program had already begun to show; Roush, annoyed that Ford had blocked their efforts to run a V8 engine in the car, pulled out of the project. As a result, there was just one Mustang GTP entered in the Daytona Finale, and that ran under the "Team Zakspeed USA" banner; Rahal and Ludwig retired after 53 laps, being classified in 49th overall, and 16th in the GTP category. Rahal, who had earlier raced for Holbert Racing, was classified in 14th in the GTP driver's championship, with 47 points; Ludwig was classified in 21st, while Coconis was level with David Hobbs in 31st, and Brabham was 38th.

=== 1984 ===
Despite the car's problems in the latter two races, Zakspeed and Ford continued with the Mustang GTP program in 1984; the 2.1-litre engine was finally ready, and was used throughout the season. Ludwig was selected to drive the solitary entry at the Grand Prix of Miami, which was the second round of the IMSA GT Championship; a puncture damaged the front left suspension on his car, and forced him to retire after 31 laps, resulting in Ludwig being classified 25th. The team skipped the 12 Hours of Sebring, and next entered Ludwig and Rahal at the Grand Prix of Atlanta; this time, the fuel injection system packed up after 47 laps, restricting them to 48th overall, and 18th in the GTP category. The Los Angeles Times Grand Prix was little better; Rahal and Ludwig completed 74 laps before a valve in the engine broke, and forced them out of the race, resulting in a classification of 40th overall, and 20th in the GTP category. Two cars were entered at the Monterey Triple Crown; Ludwig drove one, while Bob Wollek drove the other. However, Ludwig retired on lap 45, and Wollek lasted an extra lap. The Grand Prix of Charlotte was even less successful; Ludwig crashed in practice and could not race, while Wollek retired after 21 laps, and finished 43rd overall, and 16th in class; however, he had also set the fastest lap of the race.

Neither car ran in the next two rounds, and only Ludwig competed in the 6 Hours of Watkins Glen; this time, a crankshaft failure after 17 laps saw him finish 51st overall, and 18th in the GTP category. The Portland Grand Prix saw Ludwig's Mustang GTP last 24 laps, before he retired, and was classified 29th overall, and 18th in class. At the Grand Prix of Sonoma, Ludwig (with sponsorship from 7-Eleven) was finally able to finish a race with the Mustang GTP; he took fifth, and was the last car on the lead lap. Rahal partnered with Ludwig at the Road America 500, but the team's 1983 victory would not be repeated; a retirement after 83 laps saw them classified 33rd overall, and 16th in the GTP category. Having skipped the fourteenth round of the season, Zakspeed then entered the Michigan Grand Prix with two cars; Rahal did not even complete the first lap, and Ludwig retired after 54 laps, resulting in the drivers being classified 33rd and 24th overall, 22nd and 16th in the GTP category. Zakspeed did not compete in the 16th round of the season, but did enter the Daytona Finale. Here, Brabham's engine blew after 15 laps, restricting him to 69th overall (and 30th in class), but Ludwig and Tom Gloy's Mustang GTP held together well enough for them to finish fifth overall, and in class.

Ludwig finished the season in 43rd place, with 16 points; Gloy was the only other Zakspeed driver to be classified, and his eight points were enough for joint-60th, level with Michael Brockman, Boy Hayje and Hans-Joachim Stuck. Disillusioned with the car's unreliability, Ford pulled out of the project, with Michael Kranefuss going so far as to say that "it was the worst project I've ever been involved in." Even if the Mustang GTP had been reliable, the car had questionable aerodynamics, and it was very hard to drive when the fuel loads were low. Zakspeed would replace the car with the Ford Mustang Probe for 1985, while Roush would eventually resurface in 1987, with the Ford Mustang Maxum GTP.
