= Ford Mustang Maxum GTP =

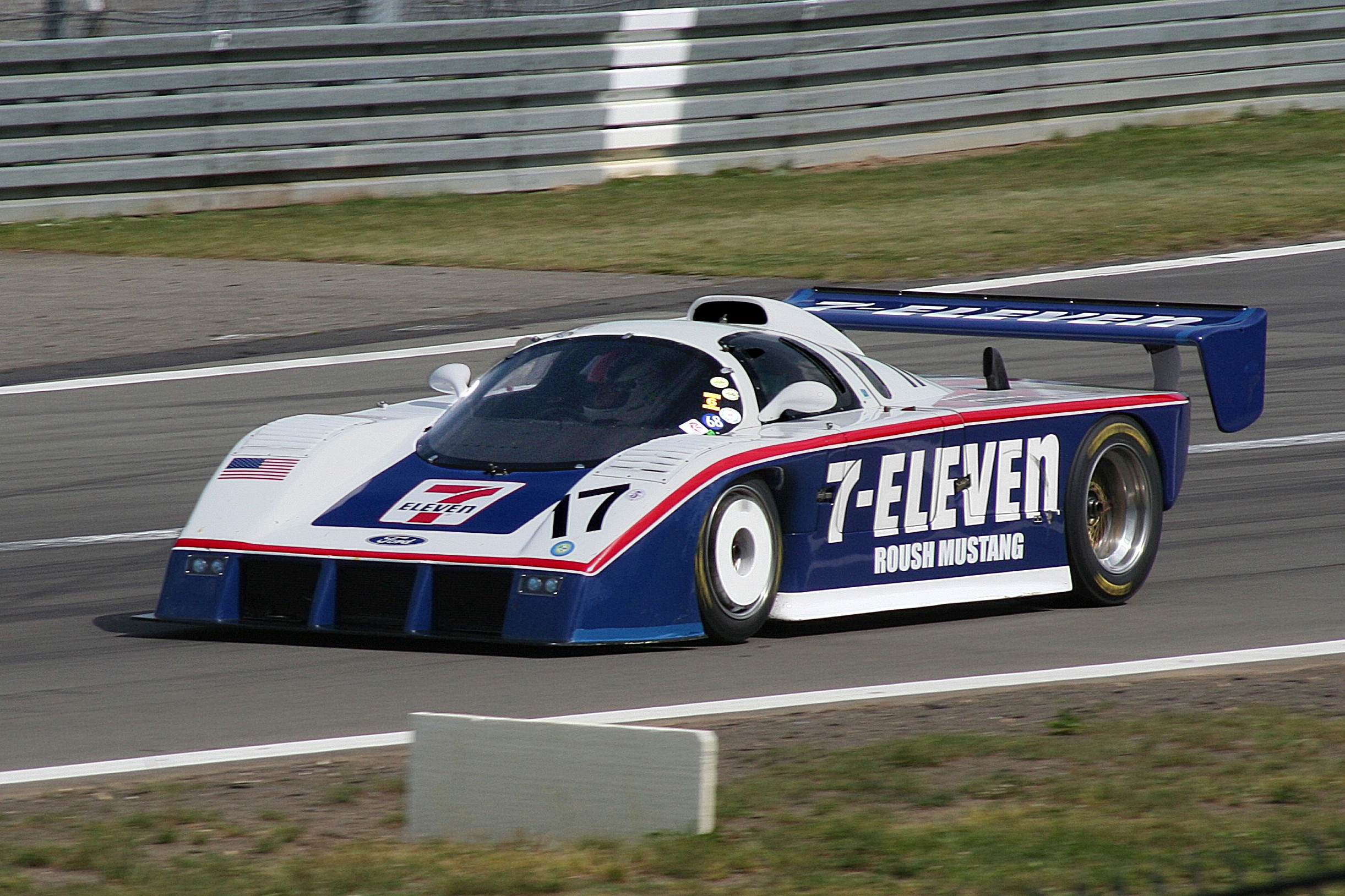
- Category: IMSA GTP
- Constructor: Maxum
- Designer: Paul Brown

Technical specifications
- Engine: Ford 6,500–7,000 cc (396.7–427.2 cu in) 16-valve, OHV V8 naturally-aspirated. mid-engined
- Tyres: Bridgestone

Competition history
- Notable entrants: Roush Racing
- Notable drivers: Scott Pruett; Pete Halsmer; Tom Gloy; Davy Jones; Whitney Ganz
- Debut: 1987 24 Hours of Daytona
Races	Wins	Poles	F/Laps
9 (11 entries)	0	0	0
- Teams' Championships: 0
- Constructors' Championships: 0
- Drivers' Championships: 0

The Ford Mustang Maxum GTP was an IMSA GTP sports racing car designed by Paul Brown and constructed by Maxum Sports Cars. It was operated by Roush Racing during the 1987 season.

== Design ==
Maxum was founded by Zakspeed manager Alan Smith, former Zakspeed designer Paul Brown and British engineer Dennis Aldred with financial backing from cosmetic heir John Shearer. Their intention was to build a low-cost customer car that was a development of the principles employed in the design of the Zakspeed Ford Mustang GTP.

The resulting car was visually similar to the Zakspeed Probe but was an entirely new clean-sheet design. It had wider underfloor venturi tunnels for increased downforce and a longer wheelbase to accommodate a wider variety of engines.

The engine acted as a stressed structural member in contrast to the four-cylinder engine in the Probe, which had to be supported by a chassis cradle. Largely constructed in a run-down industrial unit in Bolton, England, the car was designed, built and delivered in exactly 100 days.

== Racing history ==
Roush Performance debuted the car at the 1987 24 Hours of Daytona under the 'Roush Racing' banner, selecting Scott Pruett, Pete Halsmer and Tom Gloy to drive it. Unknown to Maxum, Roush had signed an exclusive deal with Bridgestone, meaning that the car was run on Bridgestone Potenza tyres rather than the Goodyear Eagles that the car had been designed for. This led to handling problems and a suspension failure after 120 laps consigned them to 58th place overall, and 14th in the IMSA GTP category.

After Daytona, the car was booked into the full scale wind tunnel at Lockheed Martin, ostensibly for aerodynamic development. John Dick, the Roush team manager, was in charge of the test and prioritised setup over aerodynamics, leaving the Maxum staff largely sidelined.

The next round of the IMSA series, which was the Grand Prix of Miami, proved rather more successful; Pruett and Halsmer brought the car home in third, beating seven of the eight Porsche 962s that finished the race, as well as the works-entered Jaguar XJR-7. Unfortunately Halsmer hit the wall on the last lap, causing significant damage to the car which resulted in them missing the 1987 Sebring 12 Hours while the car was returned to Roush's shop in Detroit for repairs.

The Grand Prix of Atlanta saw Roush retire after 45 laps, restricting them to 22nd overall, and ninth in the GTP category. Although the team finished the next race, the Los Angeles Times Grand Prix, they could do no better than 15th overall, and seventh in class; last of all those still running at the end of the race. Things didn't improve at the Monterey Triple Crown either; a blown engine after 25 laps saw Pruett finish 22nd overall, and 12th in class. The Lime Rock Grand Prix saw a strong return to form, as Pruett and Halmser took second overall, finishing 37 seconds behind Al Holbert's Porsche 962; Holbert's 962 and the Mustang Maxum GTP were the only two cars on the lead lap. Davy Jones was selected to drive the car at Grand Prix of Mid-Ohio; he retired after 23 laps, being classified in 23rd overall, and ninth in class. By now, the car had been fitted with a 7-litre version of its Ford-based V8 engine, and the 3 Hour Grand Prix of Palm Beach, where Pruett was partnered by Whitney Ganz, saw the team finish in tenth overall, and fifth in class. Halsmer returned to partner Pruett at the Camel Continental; the team, who were now running under the Applicon/Roush banner, retired after 98 laps and were classified in 15th overall, and fourth in the GTP category. Two further entries, at the California Grand Prix and the Grand Prix of Southern California, were lodged; but the Mustang Maxum GTP did not run in either of these.

Pruett, who had driven the most races with the car, was classified 16th in the Driver's Championship, with 47 points, whilst Halsmer was 19th, with 41 points.

== Legal Action ==
The car's poor performance was a source of considerable irritation to Jack Roush and he refused to pay the balance of his contract with Maxum. During the lawsuit which followed, John Dick admitted that he had unilaterally made significant modifications to the car before it had ever turned a wheel. As this meant that the performance of the car 'as designed' had never been tested, the case was ultimately settled out of court. The two chassis were returned to Maxum and Roush paid a significant financial settlement.

After the cars arrived back in the UK, Denis Aldred discovered that the nose of the car that Halsmer had crashed at Miami had been poorly repaired. The suspension mounts were now located in holes that were too large, causing them to ‘wander’ during a race with the direct effect of making the handling unpredictable.

== LOTEC C1000 ==
A third chassis was produced but never sold. It sat in the back of Denis Aldred's industrial unit in Bolton for seven years before being purchased by LOTEC to be used in the development of the LOTEC C1000 one-off supercar.
