= 2007 Star Mazda Championship =

Open wheel auto racing series

Seasons
- ← 2006 2008 →

The 2007 Star Mazda Championship was the ninth season of the Star Mazda Championship, an open wheel auto racing series that competes using spec chassis and engines. The season featured 12 races over 12 weekends, with only road courses and street circuits featuring on the schedule. The overall season champion was Dane Cameron, while Dan Tomlin, III and Steve Hickham won the Expert and Masters classes respectively.

Cameron finished on the podium in eight of the twelve races and finished well ahead of second-place finisher, Australian James Davison who won once at Mosport. Canadian Lorenzo Mandarino won twice and finished eights in points as he finished outside the top-ten seven times. Canadian Marco Di Leo won the season opener at Sebring International Raceway but it would be his only win of the season. His brother Daniel finished second in that race. Ron White won back-to-back races in the rounds at Road America and Circuit Trois-Rivières and finished third in points.

== Race calendar and results ==
| Rnd | Circuit | Location | Date | Pole position | Winning driver | Supporting |
|---|---|---|---|---|---|---|
| 1 | (United States) Sebring International Raceway | Sebring, Florida | March 16 | (United States) Dane Cameron | (Canada) Marco di Leo | American Le Mans Series |
| 2 | (United States) Grand Prix of Houston | Houston, Texas | April 22 | (United States) Dane Cameron | (United States) Dane Cameron | American Le Mans Series / Champ Car World Series |
| 3 | (United States) Virginia International Raceway | Alton, Virginia | April 28 | (Australia) James Davison | (United States) Dane Cameron | Grand-Am Rolex Sports Car Series |
| 4 | (United States) Miller Motorsports Park | Tooele, Utah | May 19 | (Australia) James Davison | (Canada) Lorenzo Mandarino | American Le Mans Series |
| 5 | (United States) Portland International Raceway | Portland, Oregon | June 9 | (Canada) Marco di Leo | (Canada) Devin Cunningham | Champ Car World Series |
| 6 | (United States) Grand Prix of Cleveland | Cleveland, Ohio | June 24 | (United States) Dane Cameron | (United States) Jonathan Goring | Champ Car World Series |
| 7 | (Canada) Grand Prix of Toronto | Toronto, Ontario | July 7 | (United States) Dane Cameron | (United States) Dane Cameron | Champ Car World Series |
| 8 | (United States) Road America | Elkhart Lake, Wisconsin | August 11 | (Canada) Marco di Leo | (United States) Ron White | American Le Mans Series |
| 9 | (Canada) Circuit Trois-Rivières | Trois-Rivières, Quebec | August 19 | (United States) Alex Ardoin | (United States) Ron White | Stand alone |
| 10 | (Canada) Mosport International Raceway | Bowmanville, Ontario | August 25 | (United States) Dane Cameron | (Australia) James Davison | American Le Mans Series |
| 11 | (United States) Road Atlanta | Braselton, Georgia | October 5 | (Australia) James Davison | (Canada) Lorenzo Mandarino | American Le Mans Series |
| 12 | (United States) Mazda Raceway Laguna Seca | Monterey, California | October 20 | (United States) Dane Cameron | (United States) Alex Ardoin | American Le Mans Series |

== Final points standings ==
| Pos | Name | SEB (United States) | HOU (United States) | VIR (United States) | MMP (United States) | POR (United States) | CLE (United States) | TOR (Canada) | RAM (United States) | TRO (Canada) | MOS (Canada) | RAT (United States) | LAG (United States) | Pts |
|---|---|---|---|---|---|---|---|---|---|---|---|---|---|---|
| 1 | (United States) Dane Cameron | **4** | **1** | 1 | 4 | 17 | **2** | **1** | 2 | 2 | **3** | 8 | **2** | 450 |
| 2 | (Australia) James Davison | 3 | 7 | **4** | **2** | 13 | 17 | 5 | 4 | 11 | 1 | **5** | 3 | 389 |
| 3 | (United States) Ron White | 21 | 4 | 2 | 7 | 3 | 5 | 17 | 1 | 1 | 17 | 6 | 19 | 360 |
| 4 | (United States) Nick Haye | 9 | 5 | 8 | 6 | 15 | 11 | 15 | 3 | 3 | 9 | 7 | 4 | 348 |
| 5 | (United States) Jonathan Goring | 10 | 3 | 15 | 3 | 9 | 1 | 14 | 18 | 15 | 7 | 4 | 6 | 346 |
| 6 | (United States) Alex Ardoin | 12 | 10 | 11 | 10 | 8 | 6 | 3 | 17 | **13** | 11 | 3 | 1 | 345 |
| 7 | (Canada) Devin Cunningham | 15 | 13 | 13 | 12 | 1 | 8 | 2 | 6 | 16 | 12 | 2 | 9 | 344 |
| 8 | (Canada) Lorenzo Mandarino | 5 | 22 | 5 | 1 | 11 | 18 | 19 | 15 | 12 | 2 | 1 | 18 | 329 |
| 9 | (Canada) Marco di Leo | 1 | 18 | 3 | 5 | **7** | 7 | 13 | **8** | 14 | 20 | 10 | 7 | 319 |
| 10 | (United States) Russell Walker | 17 | 6 | 20 | 8 | 4 | 19 | 7 | 16 | 4 | 18 | 16 | 8 | 293 |
| 11 | (United States) Eric Freiberg | 11 | 19 | 7 | 13 | 14 | 21 | 8 | 5 | 18 | 6 | 9 | 17 | 285 |
| 12 | (United Kingdom) Jonny Baker | 20 | 20 | 9 | 19 | 18 | 13 | 9 | 20 | 5 | 4 | 17 | 11 | 270 |
| 13 | (United States) Charles Anti | 8 | 17 | 10 | 11 | 16 | 9 | 16 | 10 | 17 | 10 | | 14 | 258 |
| 14 | (United States) Steve Hickham | 23 | 16 | 17 | 16 | | 16 | 10 | 12 | 8 | 16 | 13 | 13 | 236 |
| 15 | (Switzerland) Natacha Gachnang | | | | 9 | 2 | 3 | 6 | 7 | 10 | 8 | | | 217 |
| 16 | (United States) Scott Rettich | 19 | | | 17 | 12 | 12 | 18 | 9 | 6 | 13 | | 10 | 208 |
| 17 | (United States) Dan Tomlin, Jr. | 22 | 23 | 18 | | | 15 | 11 | 14 | | 15 | 15 | 12 | 179 |
| 18 | (Philippines) Tyson Sy | 16 | 9 | 22 | | 5 | 4 | 4 | | | | | | 161 |
| 19 | (United States) Dan Tomlin, III | | | | | | 20 | 12 | 13 | 7 | 19 | 14 | 15 | 152 |
| = | (United States) Phil Fogg, Jr. | 13 | 14 | | 18 | 10 | | 20 | | 9 | | | 16 | 152 |
| 21 | (United States) Tony Rivera | 24 | 8 | 12 | 15 | 6 | | | | | 5 | | | 147 |
| 22 | (United States) Richard Zober | | | 14 | 14 | | 10 | | 11 | | | 12 | | 119 |
| 23 | (United States) Gerry Kraut | 26 | | 16 | | | 14 | | 19 | | 14 | 11 | | 116 |
| 24 | (Canada) Daniel di Leo | 2 | 2 | 6 | | | | | | | | | | 110 |
| 25 | (United States) Cole Morgan | 6 | 21 | 19 | | | | | | | | | | 62 |
| = | (United Kingdom) Jamie Morrow | 14 | 11 | 21 | | | | | | | | | | 62 |
| 27 | (United States) John Zartarian | | 12 | | | | | | | | | | 5 | 56 |
| 28 | (Canada) Michael Duncalfe | 25 | 15 | 24 | | | | | | | | | | 44 |
| 29 | (Venezuela) Ricardo Vassmer | 7 | | 23 | | | | | | | | | | 42 |
| 30 | (United States) Sean Burstyn | 18 | | | | | | | | | | | | 18 |
| Pos | Name | SEB (United States) | HOU (United States) | VIR (United States) | MMP (United States) | POR (United States) | CLE (United States) | TOR (Canada) | RAM (United States) | TRO (Canada) | MOS (Canada) | RAT (United States) | LAG (United States) | Pts |

| Color | Result |
|---|---|
| Gold | Winner |
| Silver | 2nd place |
| Bronze | 3rd place |
| Green | 4th & 5th place |
| Light Blue | 6th–10th place |
| Dark Blue | Finished (Outside Top 10) |
| Purple | Did not finish |
| Red | Did not qualify (DNQ) |
| Brown | Withdrawn (Wth) |
| Black | Disqualified (DSQ) |
| White | Did not start (DNS) |
| Blank | Did not participate (DNP) |
| Blank | Not competing |

**In-line notation**
| **Bold** | Pole position (1 point) |
| Italics | Ran fastest race lap |
| * | Led most race laps |
| ^{1} | Qualifying cancelled no bonus point awarded |
Rookie of the Year
Rookie

| Position | 1 | 2 | 3 | 4 | 5 | 6 | 7 | 8 | 9 | 10 | 11 | 12 | 13 | 14 | 15 | 16 | 17 | 18 | 19 | 20 | 21 | 22 | 23 | 24 | 25 | 26 | 27 | 28 | 29 | 30 | 31 | 32 | 33 | 34 | 35 |
| Points | 44 | 40 | 37 | 34 | 32 | 30 | 29 | 28 | 27 | 26 | 25 | 24 | 23 | 22 | 21 | 20 | 19 | 18 | 17 | 16 | 15 | 14 | 13 | 12 | 11 | 10 | 9 | 8 | 7 | 6 | 5 | 4 | 3 | 2 | 1 |
