= 2006 Formula Ford 2000 Championship Series =

Car racing competition

2006 U.S. F2000 National Championship

Seasons
- ← 2005 2010 →

The 2006 Cooper Tires Formula Ford 2000 Championship Series was the sixth and final season of the USF2000 Ford Zetec championship. It proved to be the ultimate USF2000 championship until the relaunch in 2010. J.R. Hildebrand won the championship in a Cape Motorsports entered Van Diemen RF05.

== Race calendar and results ==
Round	Circuit	Location	Date	Pole position	Fastest lap	Winner
1	Road Atlanta	(United States) Braselton, Georgia	May 13	(United States) Dane Cameron	(United States) J.R. Hildebrand	(United States) J.R. Hildebrand
2	Road Atlanta	(United States) Braselton, Georgia	May 13	(United States) J.R. Hildebrand	(United Kingdom) Dominik Jackson	(United States) J.R. Hildebrand
3	Mid-Ohio Sports Car Course	(United States) Lexington, Ohio	May 20	(United States) J.R. Hildebrand	(United States) J.R. Hildebrand	(United States) J.R. Hildebrand
4	Mid-Ohio Sports Car Course	(United States) Lexington, Ohio	May 21	no pole awarded		(United States) J.R. Hildebrand
5	Portland International Raceway	(United States) Portland, Oregon	June 17	(United States) J.R. Hildebrand	(United States) J.R. Hildebrand	(United States) J.R. Hildebrand
6	Portland International Raceway	(United States) Portland, Oregon	June 18	(United States) J.R. Hildebrand	(New Zealand) Andy Knight	(United States) J.R. Hildebrand
7	Grand Prix of Cleveland	(United States) Cleveland, Ohio	June 24	(United States) Dane Cameron	(United States) J.R. Hildebrand	(United States) J.R. Hildebrand
8	Grand Prix of Cleveland	(United States) Cleveland, Ohio	June 25	(United States) J.R. Hildebrand	(United States) Dane Cameron	(United States) Dane Cameron
9	Honda Indy Toronto	(Canada) Toronto	July 8	(United States) J.R. Hildebrand	(United States) J.R. Hildebrand	(United States) J.R. Hildebrand
10	Honda Indy Toronto	(Canada) Toronto	July 9	(United States) J.R. Hildebrand	(United States) J.R. Hildebrand	(United States) J.R. Hildebrand
11	Mid-Ohio Sports Car Course	(United States) Lexington, Ohio	September 16	(United States) J.R. Hildebrand	(United States) J.R. Hildebrand	(United States) J.R. Hildebrand
12	Mid-Ohio Sports Car Course	(United States) Lexington, Ohio	September 17	(United States) Dane Cameron	(United States) Dane Cameron	(United States) J.R. Hildebrand
13	Road America	(United States) Elkhart Lake, Wisconsin	September 23	(United States) J.R. Hildebrand	(United States) J.R. Hildebrand	(United States) Dane Cameron
14	Road America	(United States) Elkhart Lake, Wisconsin	September 24	(United States) Dane Cameron	(United States) J.R. Hildebrand	(United States) J.R. Hildebrand

== Final standings ==
Rank	Driver	(United States) ATL1	(United States) ATL2	(United States) MOH1	(United States) MOH2	(United States) PIR1	(United States) PIR2	(United States) CLE1	(United States) CLE2	(Canada) TOR1	(Canada) TOR1	(United States) MOH3	(United States) MOH4	(United States) ROA1	(United States) ROA2	Points
1	(United States) J.R. Hildebrand	1	1	1	1	1	1	1	2	1	1	1	1	13	1	381
2	(United States) Dane Cameron	2	2	26	3	8	9	2	1	2	2	2	17	1	11	272
3	(Venezuela) Ricardo Vassmer	3	7	6	13	5	22	4	3	3	3	3	4	3	5	233
4	(United States) Jason Byers	16	6	2	2	7	3	5	5	15	5	5	6	4	2	228
5	(United States) Chris Meredith	5	17	3	21	21	7	3	11	5	8	4	3	23	6	176
6	(United States) Noah Bystrom	15	26	7	6	17	13	10	7	4	4	8	9	6	4	165
7	(United States) Slade Miller	7	24	27	11	6	6	8	8			7	2	5	8	150
8	(New Zealand) Andy Knight	4	4	8	4	2	12	6	4							138
9	(United States) Philip Metzger	24	28	11	7	11	10	12	10	6	14	6	5	21	25	121
10	(Mexico) Juliana Gonzalez	9	25	14	26	16	18	18	15	14	7	14	8	8	10	101
11	(United States) Scott Rubenzer	25	8	12	14			11	12			9	7	16	9	92
12	(United States) Nick Haye			4	5	4	4									74
13	(United States) Clark Cambern	8	5	17	8			9	6	18	20					74
14	(Canada) Jim Hallman	14	19	25	28			17	16	7	9	12	13	15	22	69
15	(Canada) Olivier Comeau	22	16					7	8			16	6	9	27	62
16	(United States) Gerald Kraut	6	15	13	9	20	8	26	30					24	24	58
17	(Venezuela) Alexis Sabet	13	14	23	16	19	11	13	14			13	18	27	DNS	52
18	(United States) Doug Kniffin	28	12	28	27			30	26	8	10	15	12			52
19	(United States) Chuck Lessick	23	20	19	19			15	18	10	12	11	14			52
20	(United States) Dwight Rider	11	9	24	24	23	16	29	19	18	18			10	17	50
21	(United States) Robert Podlesni					3	2									47
22	(United States) Steve Welk													2	3	47
23	(United Kingdom) Dominik Jackson	20	3	5	25											41
24	(Brazil) Wladimir Genovesi, Jr.	21	27	9	10	12	26	21	25							37
25	(United States) Chris Hundley	10	10			9	20									35
26	(Mexico) Manuel Gutierrez					25	24	25	13	13	16	18	10			34
27	(United States) Dan Denison	17	22	18	17			19	24	12	11					34
28	(United States) Ira Fierberg	27	11			26	17	16	20	17	15					29
29	(United States) Shaun Modisette					10	5									28
30	(United States) Steve Thomson													7	7	28
31	(United States) John Lombardo					13	15	31	31							14
32	(United States) Chris Spreitzer					14	14									14
33	(United States) Patrick Barrett													17	12	13
34	(Italy) Fiorenzo Tirinnanzi					27	25			19	19			30	15	9
35	(United States) Todd McNaughton					15	21									7
36	(United States) Scott Foutch				18	27										4
37	(United States) Charles Finelli			22	22			22	28							4
38	(United States) Andrew King					22	23									2
	(United States) Mike Beauchamp													25	23	
	(United States) Mark Defer	19	18	15	23			20	29							
	(United States) Brent Gilkes	18	21	21	20			27	21	11	17					
	(United States) Bill Jordan	26	23	20	18			24	22					18	26	
	(United States) Cole Morgan	12	13	10	12	24	19	14	17			10	11	11	29	
	(United States) Seth Ravndal			16	15			28	23	9	13	16	15			
	(United States) Mike Wettstein													28	28	
