= Ford Probe GTP =

Ford Mustang GTP
- Category: IMSA GTP
- Constructor: Ford
- Designer: Paul Brown

Technical specifications
- Chassis: Carbon fibre and Nomex composite monocoque chassis, reinforced with Kevlar in key areas
- Engine: 2.1 Aluminum Turbo Engine 2,124 cc (129.6 cu in) 16-valve, DOHC I4, turbocharged, mid-engined, longitudinally mounted
- Transmission: Hewland VG5 5-speed manual
- Weight: 1,770 lb (803 kg)
- Tyres: Goodyear

Competition history
- Notable entrants: Team Zakspeed USA
Wins	Podiums
1	2
- Teams' Championships: 0
- Constructors' Championships: 0
- Drivers' Championships: 0

The Ford Probe GTP, also sometimes called the Ford Mustang Probe GTP, was an IMSA GTP sports racing car, designed, developed and built by German constructor Zakspeed, and used by the Zakspeed Racing team in the 1985 IMSA GT Championship. Unlike the road car, using a conventional front-engined designed, the prototype race car used a mid-engined design (also known as a rear mid-engine design; behind the driver, but in front of the rear axle). It was powered by a 2.1 L (130 cu in) engine that was based on the Zakspeed 1500, as used in Zakspeed's Formula 1 cars. The 2.1 litre engine that was used in the Ford Probe GTP is often confused with the Ford Lima based engine that was used in the Ford Mustang GTP and the 2.1 litre variants of the Cosworth BDA engine. In Endurance racing trim it produced 600 hp (450 kW), which was plenty powerful enough for the lightweight 1,770 lb (800 kg) vehicle. This drove the rear wheels through a five-speed Hewland VG5 manual transmission. Klaus Ludwig, Doc Bundy, Lyn St. James, Scott Pruett, Pete Halsmer, Arie Luyendyk, Tom Gloy, and Chip Robinson all drove the car. Highlights for the car included two second-place podium finishes at Watkins Glen and Sears Point in 1985, and an outright win for Klaus Ludwig at Laguna Seca in 1986.
