= Ford Zakspeed Mustang Turbo =

- Category: IMSA GTX; IMSA GTP
- Constructor: Zakspeed
- Designer(s): Bob Riley
- Successor: Ford Mustang GTP

Technical specifications
- Chassis: Carbon fibre and Nomex composite monocoque chassis, reinforced with Kevlar in key areas
- Suspension (front): Double wishbones with Koni coil-over springs, and adjustable sway bars
- Suspension (rear): Double wishbones with Koni coil-over springs, and adjustable sway bars
- Engine: Cosworth BDA 1.6–2.1 L (97.6–128.1 cu in) 16 valve, DOHC I4, turbocharged, front engined, longitudinally mounted
- Transmission: Hewland VG5 5-speed manual
- Weight: 1,760 lb (798 kg)
- Tyres: Firestone

Competition history
- Notable entrants: Zakspeed-Roush; Bill Scott Racing (as Team Zakspeed USA
- Debut: 1981

The Ford Mustang GTX was an American GT race car constructed to compete in the GTX category of the IMSA GT Championship series by Ford. Originally based on the second generation Ford Mustang (known as the Mustang II), and later the third generation Ford Mustang (commonly referred to as the "Fox-Body Mustang") road car, built between 1979 and 1983. It was initially powered a 1.7-liter twin-turbo four-cylinder engine, supplied by Zakspeed, and producing around 600 hp (450 kW). This was later changed in 1982, to an enlarged 2.1-liter turbocharged variant of the Ford-Cosworth BDA straight-four engine, capable of producing around 675 hp (503 kW; 684 PS). The car was very light, weighing only around 1,760 lb (800 kg).

The car competed in the then new IMSA GTP category in 1982.

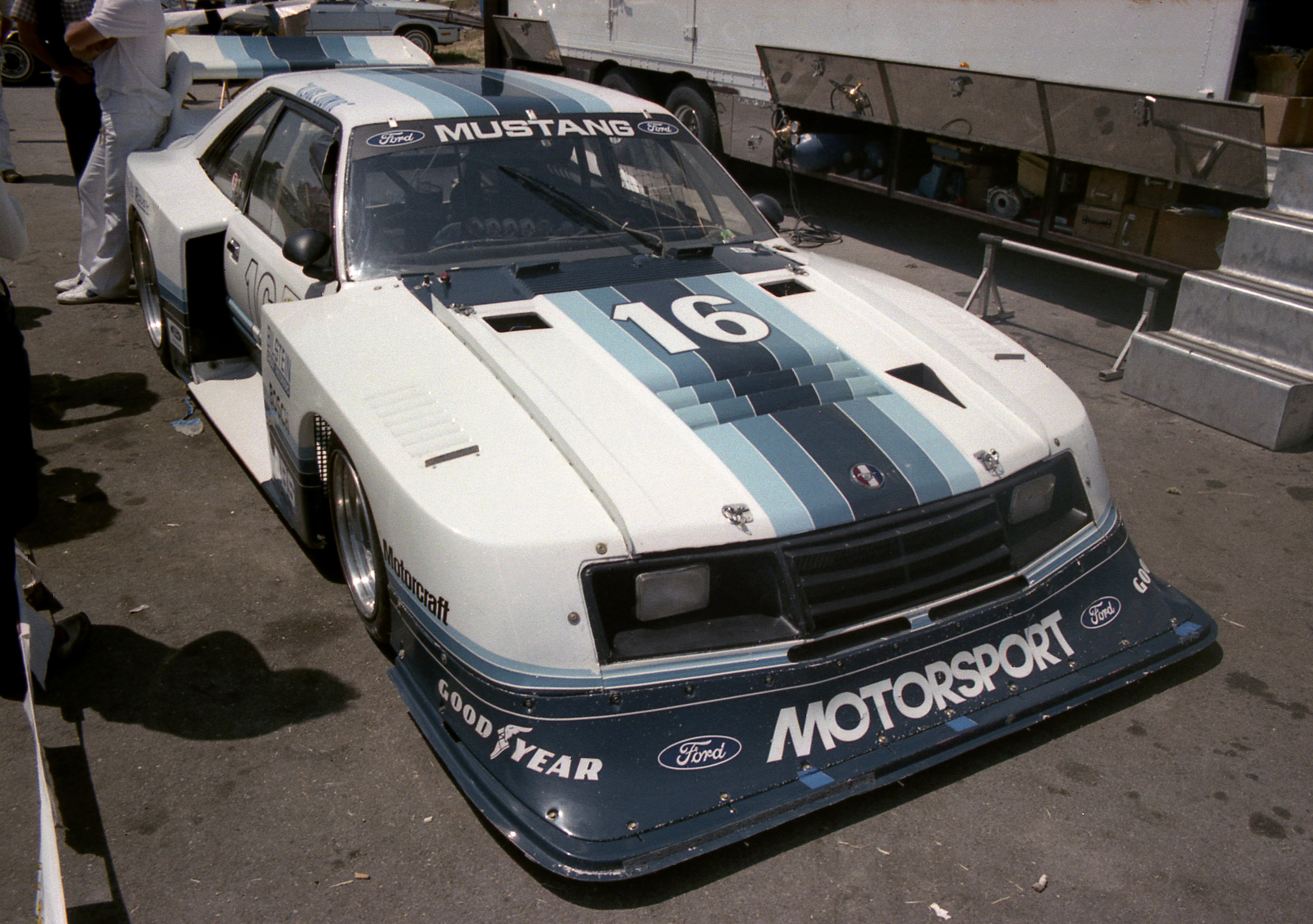
Ford Mustang Turbo of Team Zakspeed Roush at Laguna Seca in 1982
