= 2016 Petit Le Mans =

Sportscar endurance race in Georgia, US

Road Atlanta

The Petit Le Mans powered by Mazda was the 2016 edition of the Petit Le Mans automotive endurance race, held on October 1, 2016, at the Road Atlanta circuit in Braselton, Georgia, United States. It was the 12th and final race of the 2016 WeatherTech SportsCar Championship, and the third Petit Le Mans run since the formation of the WeatherTech SportsCar Championship in 2014.

== Background ==
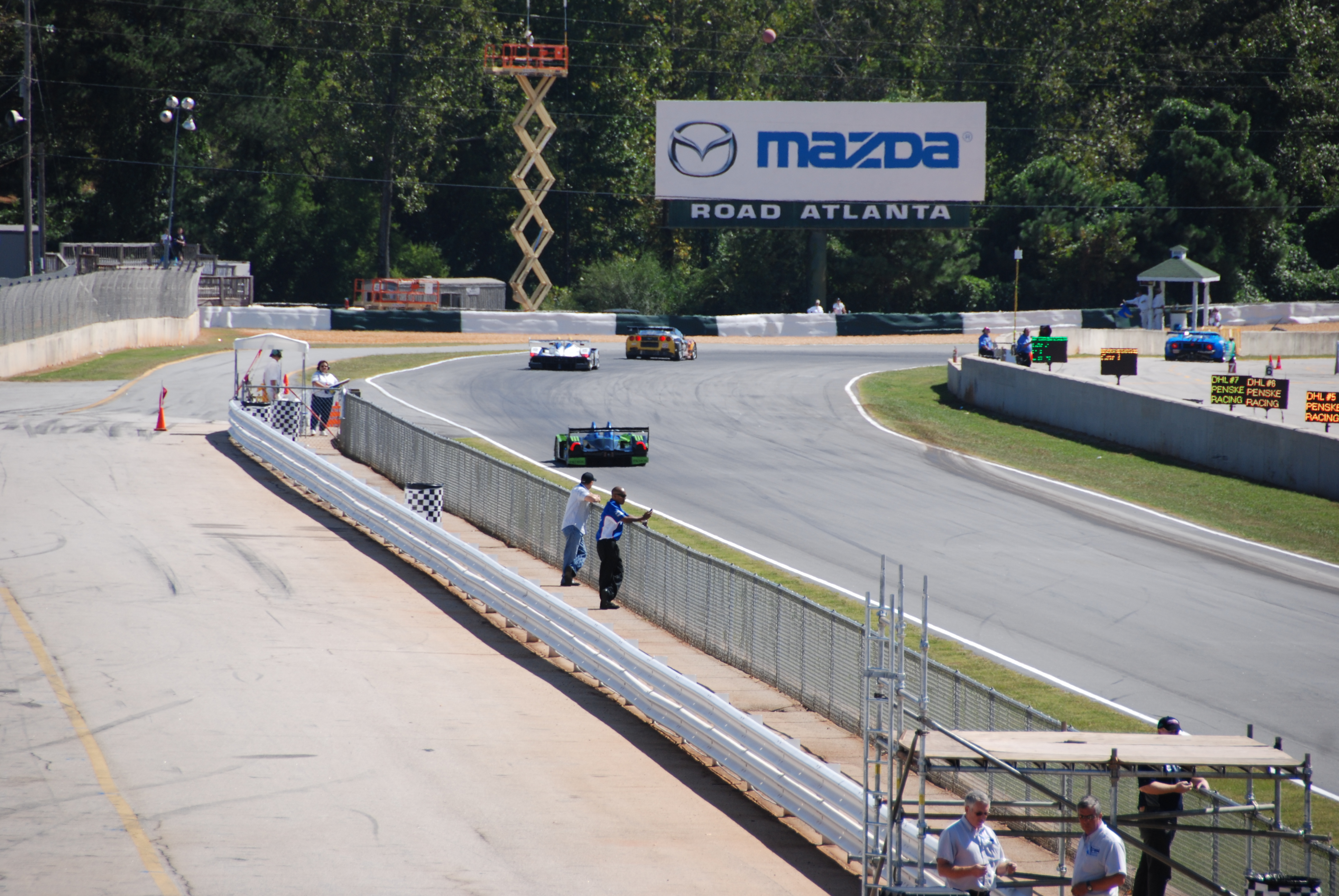
Michelin Raceway Road Atlanta, where the race was held.

=== Preview ===
International Motor Sports Association (IMSA) president Scott Atherton confirmed the race was part of the schedule for the 2016 IMSA SportsCar Championship (IMSA SCC) in August 2015. It was the third consecutive year the event was held as part of the WeatherTech SportsCar Championship, and the 19th Petit Le Mans. The Petit Le Mans was the last of twelve scheduled automobile endurance races of 2016 by IMSA, and the last in the four round North American Endurance Cup (NAEC). The race took place at the 12-turn, 2.540-mile (4.088 km) Road Atlanta in Braselton, Georgia on October 1, 2016.

Before the race, Eric Curran and Dane Cameron were leading the Prototype Drivers' Championship with 285 points, ahead of João Barbosa and Christian Fittipaldi in second by one point, and Jordan Taylor and Ricky Taylor in third with 278 points. With 329 points, Alex Popow and Renger van der Zande led the Prototype Challenge Drivers' Championship over Robert Alon and Tom Kimber-Smith by 10 points. In GTLM, Oliver Gavin and Tommy Milner led the Drivers' Championship with 314 points, 11 ahead of Ryan Briscoe and Richard Westbrook. In GTD, the Drivers' Championship was led by Alessandro Balzan and Christina Nielsen with 299 points; the duo held a thirty two-point advantage over Jeroen Bleekemolen and Ben Keating. Chevrolet and Audi were leading their respective Manufacturers' Championships, while Action Express Racing, Starworks Motorsport, Corvette Racing, and Scuderia Corsa each led their own Teams' Championships.

== Practice ==
There were four practice sessions preceding the start of the race on Saturday, three on Thursday and one on Friday. The first two one-hour sessions were on Thursday morning and afternoon. The third held later that evening ran for 90 minutes; the fourth on Friday morning lasted an hour.

In the first practice session, Olivier Pla set the fastest lap in the No. 60 MSR Ligier-Honda at 1 minute,14.157 seconds, 0.539 seconds faster than Bomarito's No. 55 Mazda. Dane Cameron was third fastest in the No. 31 AER vehicle. The fastest PC car was Renger van der Zande's No. 8 Starworks Motorsports entry with a 1-minute, 16.235 seconds, followed by Stephen Simpson's No. 85 JDC car. With a 1:18.840 lap, García led the GTLM class in the No. 3 Corvette, ahead of Fisichella's No. 62 Risi Competizione Ferrari 488 GTE. Alex Riberas in the No. 23 Team Seattle/Alex Job Racing Porsche recorded the fastest time in GTD.

In the second session, Negri was fastest with a time of 1 minute, 13.923 seconds, ahead of the two Mazdas. The seven-vehicle PC class was led by BAR1's No. 20 car, driven by Mowlem with a time of 1 minute, 16.707 seconds. Ferrari paced GTLM with Scuderia Corsa's 488 of Serra lapping 1:18.354 from Hand's second-placed No. 66 CGR Ford GT. Bergmeister led GTD with a time of 1:21.340.

The third practice session ran at night and saw Pla's No. 60 MSR vehicle set the fastest time overall at 1 minute, 13.541 seconds. Bomarito was almost five-tenths behind in second, with the No. 5 AER car of Barbosa third. A 1:18.240 lap saw Coletti's No. 7 Starworks Motorsport car lead PC. Müller's No. 66 Ford lead GTLM over Alessandro Pier Guidi's No. 68 Scuderia Corsa Ferrari and Westbrook's No. 67 Ford by more than one-tenth of a second. Audi paced GTD with Magnus' R8 of Seefreid lapping 1:21.187, ahead of Lawson Aschenbach's No. 9 Stevenson Audi.

Pla led the final session in No. 60 MSR Ligier-Honda with a lap of 1 minute, 10.786 seconds. Nunez's No. 55 Mazda was second-fastest, followed by ESM's Derani. French's No. 38 PTM Oreca led PC with a 1:15.925 lap, faster than Kimber-Smith's No. 52 PR/1 vehicle. Ferrari occupied first and second in GTLM with Serra's No. 68 Scuderia Corsa car faster than Vilander's Risi 488 by two-tenths of a second. Lally's No. 44 Magnus Racing Audi R8 led GTD, and Jeroen Bleekemolen, in the No. 33 Riley Motorsport Dodge, was second in class.

== Qualifying ==
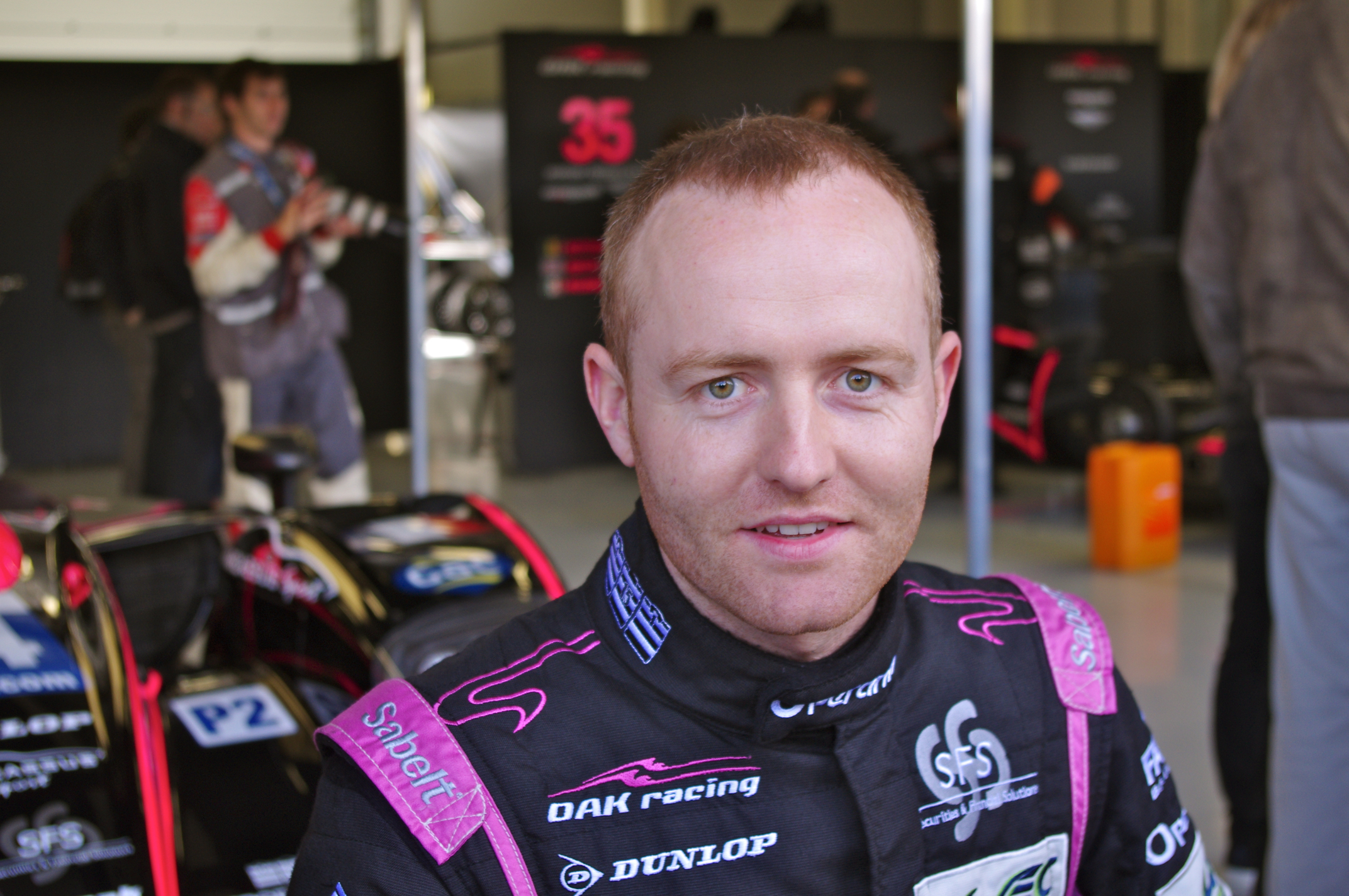
Olivier Pla (pictured in 2013) helped take MSRs second pole position of 2016.

In Friday afternoon's 90-minute four-group qualifying, each category had separate 15-minute sessions. Regulations stipulated that teams nominate one qualifying driver, with the fastest laps determining each class' starting order. IMSA arranged the grid to put Prototypes ahead of the PC, GTLM and GTD cars.

Olivier Pla in the No. 60 MSR Ligier-Honda took his second pole position of the season with a lap of 1 minute, 13.061 seconds. He was joined on the grid's front row by Tristan Nunez whose best lap in the No. 55 Mazda was 0.459 seconds slower. Dane Cameron's No. 31 AER Corvette DP took third followed by Tom Long's No. 70 Mazda. Fittipaldi's No. 5 AER car started from fifth.

Alon set the fastest time in PC to take pole for PR1/Mathiasen Motorsports with a 1:16.411 time. Popow qualified the No. 8 Starworks entry second followed by Johnny Mowlem's No. 20 BAR1 car. Koch was fourth for Performance Tech and Coletti qualified fifth. In GTLM, Westbrook took his third pole of the season with a time of 1 minute, 18.131 seconds. He was joined by Antonio García's No. 3 Corvette on the grid's front row with his best lap being 0.152 seconds slower, and Toni Vilander drove the No. 62 Risi Competizione Ferrari 488 to third place. Hand was fourth in the slower Ford with the No. 68 Scuderia Corsa Ferrari of Serra fifth. The fastest BMW was Edwards' No. 100 RLL M6 in sixth, and Milner's No. 4 Corvette took seventh.

Bleekemolen took pole in GTD in Riley Motorsports' No. 33 Dodge with a 1-minute, 21.305 seconds time. Matt McMurry's No. 73 Park Place Porsche qualified second, and Mario Farnbacher's No. 23 AJR car was third. Rounding out the top five in the class were the No. 63 Scuderia Corsa Ferrari 488 GT3 of Nielsen, and Aschenbach's No. 9 Stevenson Motorsports Audi R8 LMS.

=== Qualifying results ===
Pole positions in each class are indicated in bold and by ‡. All Prototype and Prototype Challenge cars were grouped together on the starting grid, regardless of qualifying position.

Pos	Class	No.	Team	Driver	Time	Gap	Grid
1	**P**	**60**	(United States) **Michael Shank Racing w/Curb Agajanian**	**(France) Olivier Pla**	**1:13.061**	**_**	1‡
2	P	55	(Japan) Mazda Motorsports	(United States) Tristan Nunez	1:13.520	+0.459	2
3	P	31	(United States) Action Express Racing	(United States) Dane Cameron	1:13.903	+0.842	3
4	P	70	(Japan) Mazda Motorsports	(United States) Tom Long	1:14.061	+1.000	4
5	P	5	(United States) Action Express Racing	(Brazil) Christian Fittipaldi	1:14.160	+1.099	5
6	P	90	(United States) VisitFlorida Racing	(United Kingdom) Ryan Dalziel	1:14.276	+1.215	6
7	P	2	(United States) Tequila Patrón ESM	(United States) Johannes van Overbeek	1:14.360	+1.299	7
8	P	0	(United States) Panoz DeltaWing Racing	(United Kingdom) Andy Meyrick	1:14.446	+1.385	8
9	P	10	(United States) Wayne Taylor Racing	(United States) Ricky Taylor	1:14.533	+1.472	16^{1}
10	**PC**	**52**	(United States) **PR1/Mathiasen Motorsports**	(United States) **Robert Alon**	**1:16.411**	**+3.350**	9‡
11	PC	8	(United States) Starworks Motorsport	(Venezuela) Alex Popow	1:16.470	+3.409	10
12	PC	20	(United States) BAR1 Motorsports	(United Kingdom) Johnny Mowlem	1:16.495	+3.434	15^{2}
13	PC	38	(United States) Performance Tech Motorsports	(United States) Kenton Koch	1:16.640	+3.579	11
14	PC	7	(United States) Starworks Motorsport	(Monaco) Stefano Coletti	1:16.858	+3.797	12
15	PC	85	(United States) JDC-Miller Motorsports	(United States) Chris Miller	1:17.205	+4.144	13
16	**GTLM**	**67**	(United States) **Ford Chip Ganassi Racing**	(United Kingdom) **Richard Westbrook**	**1:18.131**	**+5.070**	17‡
17	GTLM	3	(United States) Corvette Racing	(Spain) Antonio García	1:18.283	+5.222	18
18	GTLM	62	(United States) Risi Competizione	(Finland) Toni Vilander	1:18.294	+5.233	19
19	GTLM	66	(United States) Ford Chip Ganassi Racing	(United States) Joey Hand	1:18.327	+5.266	20
20	GTLM	68	(United States) Scuderia Corsa	(Brazil) Daniel Serra	1:18.349	+5.288	21
21	GTLM	100	(United States) BMW Team RLL	(United States) John Edwards	1:18.382	+5.321	22
22	GTLM	4	(United States) Corvette Racing	(United States) Tommy Milner	1:18.468	+5.407	23
23	GTLM	912	(United States) Porsche North America	(New Zealand) Earl Bamber	1:18.712	+5.651	24
24	GTLM	25	(United States) BMW Team RLL	(United States) Bill Auberlen	1:18.752	+5.691	25
25	GTLM	911	(United States) Porsche North America	(United Kingdom) Nick Tandy	1:18.866	+5.805	26
26	PC	88	(United States) Starworks Motorsport	(United States) Mark Kvamme	1:19.407	+6.346	14
27	**GTD**	**33**	(United States) **Riley Motorsports**	(Netherlands) **Jeroen Bleekemolen**	**1:21.305**	**+8.244**	27‡
28	GTD	73	(United States) Park Place Motorsports	(United States) Matt McMurry	1:21.765	+8.704	28
29	GTD	23	(United States) Team Seattle / Alex Job Racing	(Germany) Mario Farnbacher	1:21.898	+8.837	29
30	GTD	63	(United States) Scuderia Corsa	(Denmark) Christina Nielsen	1:22.103	+9.042	30
31	GTD	9	(United States) Stevenson Motorsports	(United States) Lawson Aschenbach	1:22.114	+9.053	31
32	GTD	6	(United States) Stevenson Motorsports	(United Kingdom) Robin Liddell	1:22.139	+9.078	32
33	GTD	48	(United States) Paul Miller Racing	(United States) Madison Snow	1:22.143	+9.082	33
34	GTD	16	(United States) Change Racing	(United States) Corey Lewis	1:22.231	+9.170	34
35	GTD	96	(United States) Turner Motorsport	(United States) Bret Curtis	1:22.421	+9.360	35
36	GTD	27	(United States) Dream Racing Motorsport	(Italy) Paolo Ruberti	1:22.680	+9.619	36
37	GTD	44	(United States) Magnus Racing	(United States) John Potter	1:22.950	+9.889	37
38	GTD	97	(United States) Turner Motorsport	(United States) Michael Marsal	1:20.904	+11.111	38
Sources:

- ^{1} The No. 10 Wayne Taylor Racing entry was moved to the back of the Prototype grid as per 40.1.5 of the Sporting regulations (Tire change).
- ^{2} The No. 20 BAR1 Motorsports entry was moved to the back of the PC grid as per 43.1 of the Sporting regulations (Starting driver change).

== Race ==
=== Post-race ===
Curran and Cameron took the Prototype Drivers' championship with 314 points. They were 3 points clear of Barbosa and Fittipaldi. With 355 points, Popow and van der Zande won the PC Drivers' Championship, beating Alon and Kimber-Smith on countback. Gavin and Milner took the GTLM Drivers' Championship with 345 points. They were 17 points clear of Briscoe and Westbrook in second. García and Magnussen were third with 319 points. Balzan and Nielsen won the GTD Drivers' Championship with 332 points, 32 points ahead of Bleekemolen and Keating. Sellers and Snow were third with 293 points. Chevrolet and Audi heir respective Manufactures' Championships, while Action Express Racing, Starworks Motorsport, Corvette Racing, and Scuderia Corsa won their respective Teams' Championships.

== Race results ==
Class winners are denoted in bold and with ‡. P stands for Prototype, PC (Prototype Challenge), GTLM (Grand Touring Le Mans) and GTD (Grand Touring Daytona).

Final race classification
Pos	Class	No.	Team	Drivers	Chassis	Tire	Laps	Time/Retired
Pos	Class	No.	Team	Drivers	Engine	Tire	Laps	Time/Retired
1	**P**	**60**	**(United States) Michael Shank Racing w/Curb Agajanian**	**(France) Olivier Pla (United States) John Pew (Brazil) Oswaldo Negri Jr.**	**Ligier JS P2**	C	**412**	**10:00:30.023‡**
1	**P**	**60**	**(United States) Michael Shank Racing w/Curb Agajanian**	**(France) Olivier Pla (United States) John Pew (Brazil) Oswaldo Negri Jr.**	**Honda HR28TT/HPD 2.8L V6 Twin-Turbo**	C	**412**	**10:00:30.023‡**
2	P	2	(United States) Tequila Patrón ESM	(United States) Johannes van Overbeek (United States) Scott Sharp (Brazil) Pipo Derani	Ligier JS P2	C	412	+3.524
2	P	2	(United States) Tequila Patrón ESM	(United States) Johannes van Overbeek (United States) Scott Sharp (Brazil) Pipo Derani	Honda HR28TT/HPD 2.8L V6 Twin-Turbo	C	412	+3.524
3	P	10	(United States) Wayne Taylor Racing	(United States) Ricky Taylor (United States) Jordan Taylor (Italy) Max Angelelli	Corvette Daytona Prototype	C	412	+11.745
3	P	10	(United States) Wayne Taylor Racing	(United States) Ricky Taylor (United States) Jordan Taylor (Italy) Max Angelelli	Chevrolet 5.5L V8	C	412	+11.745
4	P	31	(United States) Action Express Racing	(United States) Dane Cameron (United States) Eric Curran (France) Simon Pagenaud	Corvette Daytona Prototype	C	412	+14.258
4	P	31	(United States) Action Express Racing	(United States) Dane Cameron (United States) Eric Curran (France) Simon Pagenaud	Chevrolet 5.5L V8	C	412	+14.258
5	P	5	(United States) Action Express Racing	(Brazil) Christian Fittipaldi (Portugal) João Barbosa (Portugal) Filipe Albuquerque	Corvette Daytona Prototype	C	410	+2 Lap
5	P	5	(United States) Action Express Racing	(Brazil) Christian Fittipaldi (Portugal) João Barbosa (Portugal) Filipe Albuquerque	Chevrolet 5.5L V8	C	410	+2 Lap
6	**PC**	**52**	**(United States) PR1/Mathiasen Motorsports**	**(United States) Robert Alon (Mexico) José Gutiérrez (United Kingdom) Tom Kimber-Smith**	**Oreca FLM09**	C	**404**	**+8 laps‡**
6	**PC**	**52**	**(United States) PR1/Mathiasen Motorsports**	**(United States) Robert Alon (Mexico) José Gutiérrez (United Kingdom) Tom Kimber-Smith**	**Chevrolet LS3 6.2L V8**	C	**404**	**+8 laps‡**
7	PC	38	(United States) Performance Tech Motorsports	(United States) Kenton Koch (United States) James French (Canada) Kyle Marcelli	Oreca FLM09	C	403	+9 laps
7	PC	38	(United States) Performance Tech Motorsports	(United States) Kenton Koch (United States) James French (Canada) Kyle Marcelli	Chevrolet LS3 6.2L V8	C	403	+9 laps
8 DNF	P	70	(Japan) Mazda Motorsports	(United States) Tom Long (United States) Joel Miller (United States) Spencer Pigot	Mazda Prototype	C	401	DNF
8 DNF	P	70	(Japan) Mazda Motorsports	(United States) Tom Long (United States) Joel Miller (United States) Spencer Pigot	Mazda MZ-2.0T 2.0 L I4 Turbo	C	401	DNF
9	**GTLM**	**62**	**(United States) Risi Competizione**	**(Finland) Toni Vilander (Italy) Giancarlo Fisichella (United Kingdom) James Calado**	**Ferrari 488 GTE**	M	**398**	**+14 laps‡**
9	**GTLM**	**62**	**(United States) Risi Competizione**	**(Finland) Toni Vilander (Italy) Giancarlo Fisichella (United Kingdom) James Calado**	**Ferrari F154CB 3.9L Turbo V8**	M	**398**	**+14 laps‡**
10	GTLM	66	(United States) Ford Chip Ganassi Racing	(United States) Joey Hand (Germany) Dirk Müller (France) Sébastien Bourdais	Ford GT	M	398	+14 laps
10	GTLM	66	(United States) Ford Chip Ganassi Racing	(United States) Joey Hand (Germany) Dirk Müller (France) Sébastien Bourdais	Ford 3.5 L EcoBoost V6	M	398	+14 laps
11	GTLM	4	(United States) Corvette Racing	(United States) Tommy Milner (United Kingdom) Oliver Gavin (Switzerland) Marcel Fässler	Chevrolet Corvette C7.R	M	398	+14 laps
11	GTLM	4	(United States) Corvette Racing	(United States) Tommy Milner (United Kingdom) Oliver Gavin (Switzerland) Marcel Fässler	Chevrolet 5.5L V8	M	398	+14 laps
12	GTLM	3	(United States) Corvette Racing	(Spain) Antonio García (Denmark) Jan Magnussen (Germany) Mike Rockenfeller	Chevrolet Corvette C7.R	M	397	+15 laps
12	GTLM	3	(United States) Corvette Racing	(Spain) Antonio García (Denmark) Jan Magnussen (Germany) Mike Rockenfeller	Chevrolet 5.5L V8	M	397	+15 laps
13	PC	85	(United States) JDC-Miller Motorsports	(United States) Chris Miller (Canada) Misha Goikhberg (South Africa) Stephen Simpson	Oreca FLM09	C	395	+17 laps
13	PC	85	(United States) JDC-Miller Motorsports	(United States) Chris Miller (Canada) Misha Goikhberg (South Africa) Stephen Simpson	Chevrolet LS3 6.2L V8	C	395	+17 laps
14	GTLM	912	(United States) Porsche North America	(New Zealand) Earl Bamber (France) Frédéric Makowiecki (Denmark) Michael Christensen	Porsche 911 RSR	M	395	+17 laps
14	GTLM	912	(United States) Porsche North America	(New Zealand) Earl Bamber (France) Frédéric Makowiecki (Denmark) Michael Christensen	Porsche 4.0L Flat 6	M	395	+17 laps
15	PC	88	(United States) Starworks Motorsport	(United States) Mark Kvamme (United States) Max Hanratty (United Kingdom) Richard Bradley	Oreca FLM09	C	393	+19 laps
15	PC	88	(United States) Starworks Motorsport	(United States) Mark Kvamme (United States) Max Hanratty (United Kingdom) Richard Bradley	Chevrolet LS3 6.2L V8	C	393	+19 laps
16	GTLM	100	(United States) BMW Team RLL	(United States) John Edwards (Germany) Lucas Luhr (Canada) Kuno Wittmer	BMW M6 GTLM	M	391	+21 laps
16	GTLM	100	(United States) BMW Team RLL	(United States) John Edwards (Germany) Lucas Luhr (Canada) Kuno Wittmer	BMW 4.4L Turbo V8	M	391	+21 laps
17	**GTD**	**33**	**(United States) Riley Motorsports**	**(Netherlands) Jeroen Bleekemolen (United States) Ben Keating (United States) Marc Miller**	**Dodge Viper GT3-R**	C	**385**	**+27 laps‡**
17	**GTD**	**33**	**(United States) Riley Motorsports**	**(Netherlands) Jeroen Bleekemolen (United States) Ben Keating (United States) Marc Miller**	**Dodge 8.3L V10**	C	**385**	**+27 laps‡**
18	GTD	63	(United States) Scuderia Corsa	(Denmark) Christina Nielsen (Italy) Alessandro Balzan (United States) Jeff Segal	Ferrari 488 GT3	C	384	+28 laps
18	GTD	63	(United States) Scuderia Corsa	(Denmark) Christina Nielsen (Italy) Alessandro Balzan (United States) Jeff Segal	Ferrari F154CB 3.9L Turbo V8	C	384	+28 laps
19	GTD	97	(United States) Turner Motorsport	(United States) Michael Marsal (Finland) Markus Palttala (United States) Cameron Lawrence	BMW M6 GT3	C	384	+28 laps
19	GTD	97	(United States) Turner Motorsport	(United States) Michael Marsal (Finland) Markus Palttala (United States) Cameron Lawrence	BMW 4.4L Turbo V8	C	384	+28 laps
20	GTD	48	(United States) Paul Miller Racing	(United States) Madison Snow (United States) Bryan Sellers (United States) Bryce Miller	Lamborghini Huracán GT3	C	383	+29 laps
20	GTD	48	(United States) Paul Miller Racing	(United States) Madison Snow (United States) Bryan Sellers (United States) Bryce Miller	Lamborghini 5.2L V10	C	383	+29 laps
21	GTD	9	(United States) Stevenson Motorsports	(United States) Lawson Aschenbach (United States) Matt Bell (United States) Dion von Moltke	Audi R8 LMS	C	383	+29 laps
21	GTD	9	(United States) Stevenson Motorsports	(United States) Lawson Aschenbach (United States) Matt Bell (United States) Dion von Moltke	Audi 5.2L V10	C	383	+29 laps
22	GTD	27	(United States) Dream Racing Motorsport	(Italy) Paolo Ruberti (Italy) Luca Persiani (Monaco) Cédric Sbirrazzuoli	Lamborghini Huracán GT3	C	383	+29 laps
22	GTD	27	(United States) Dream Racing Motorsport	(Italy) Paolo Ruberti (Italy) Luca Persiani (Monaco) Cédric Sbirrazzuoli	Lamborghini 5.2L V10	C	383	+29 laps
23	GTD	6	(United States) Stevenson Motorsports	(United Kingdom) Robin Liddell (United States) Andrew Davis (United States) Mike Skeen	Audi R8 LMS	C	382	+30 laps
23	GTD	6	(United States) Stevenson Motorsports	(United Kingdom) Robin Liddell (United States) Andrew Davis (United States) Mike Skeen	Audi 5.2L V10	C	382	+30 laps
24	PC	20	(United States) BAR1 Motorsports	(United States) Tomy Drissi (United States) Don Yount (United Kingdom) Johnny Mowlem	Oreca FLM09	M	379	+33 laps
24	PC	20	(United States) BAR1 Motorsports	(United States) Tomy Drissi (United States) Don Yount (United Kingdom) Johnny Mowlem	Chevrolet LS3 6.2L V8	M	379	+33 laps
25	GTLM	67	(United States) Ford Chip Ganassi Racing	(United Kingdom) Richard Westbrook (Australia) Ryan Briscoe (New Zealand) Scott Dixon	Ford GT	M	372	+40 laps
25	GTLM	67	(United States) Ford Chip Ganassi Racing	(United Kingdom) Richard Westbrook (Australia) Ryan Briscoe (New Zealand) Scott Dixon	Ford 3.5L EcoBoost V6	M	372	+40 laps
26	GTD	23	(United States) Team Seattle / Alex Job Racing	(Germany) Mario Farnbacher (United Kingdom) Ian James (Spain) Alex Riberas	Porsche 911 GT3 R	C	366	+46 laps
26	GTD	23	(United States) Team Seattle / Alex Job Racing	(Germany) Mario Farnbacher (United Kingdom) Ian James (Spain) Alex Riberas	Porsche 4.0L Flat 6	C	366	+46 laps
27 DNF	GTD	96	(United States) Turner Motorsport	(United States) Bret Curtis (United States) Ashley Freiberg (Germany) Jens Klingmann	BMW M6 GT3	C	364	DNF
27 DNF	GTD	96	(United States) Turner Motorsport	(United States) Bret Curtis (United States) Ashley Freiberg (Germany) Jens Klingmann	BMW 4.4L Turbo V8	C	364	DNF
28 DNF	GTLM	68	(United States) Scuderia Corsa	(Italy) Andrea Bertolini (Brazil) Daniel Serra (Italy) Alessandro Pier Guidi	Ferrari 488 GTE	M	350	DNF
28 DNF	GTLM	68	(United States) Scuderia Corsa	(Italy) Andrea Bertolini (Brazil) Daniel Serra (Italy) Alessandro Pier Guidi	Ferrari F154CB 3.9L Turbo V8	M	350	DNF
29	GTD	16	(United States) Change Racing	(United States) Corey Lewis (United States) Spencer Pumpelly (Italy) Richard Antinucci	Lamborghini Huracán GT3	C	350	+62 laps
29	GTD	16	(United States) Change Racing	(United States) Corey Lewis (United States) Spencer Pumpelly (Italy) Richard Antinucci	Lamborghini 5.2L V10	C	350	+62 laps
30	GTD	44	(United States) Magnus Racing	(United States) John Potter (United States) Andy Lally (Germany) Marco Seefried	Audi R8 LMS	C	349	+63 laps
30	GTD	44	(United States) Magnus Racing	(United States) John Potter (United States) Andy Lally (Germany) Marco Seefried	Audi 5.2L V10	C	349	+63 laps
31	GTD	73	(United States) Park Place Motorsports	(United States) Matt McMurry (Germany) Jörg Bergmeister (United States) Patrick Lindsey	Porsche 911 GT3 R	C	348	+64 laps
31	GTD	73	(United States) Park Place Motorsports	(United States) Matt McMurry (Germany) Jörg Bergmeister (United States) Patrick Lindsey	Porsche 4.0L Flat 6	C	348	+64 laps
32 DNF	GTLM	25	(United States) BMW Team RLL	(United States) Bill Auberlen (Germany) Dirk Werner (Brazil) Augusto Farfus	BMW M6 GTLM	M	317	DNF
32 DNF	GTLM	25	(United States) BMW Team RLL	(United States) Bill Auberlen (Germany) Dirk Werner (Brazil) Augusto Farfus	BMW 4.4L Turbo V8	M	317	DNF
33 DNF	PC	8	(United States) Starworks Motorsport	(Venezuela) Alex Popow (Netherlands) Renger van der Zande (Denmark) David Heinemeier Hansson	Oreca FLM09	C	287	DNF
33 DNF	PC	8	(United States) Starworks Motorsport	(Venezuela) Alex Popow (Netherlands) Renger van der Zande (Denmark) David Heinemeier Hansson	Chevrolet LS3 6.2L V8	C	287	DNF
34	GTLM	911	(United States) Porsche North America	(United Kingdom) Nick Tandy (France) Patrick Pilet (Austria) Richard Lietz	Porsche 911 RSR	M	229	+183 laps
34	GTLM	911	(United States) Porsche North America	(United Kingdom) Nick Tandy (France) Patrick Pilet (Austria) Richard Lietz	Porsche 4.0L Flat 6	M	229	+183 laps
35 DNF	P	90	(United States) VisitFlorida Racing	(United Kingdom) Ryan Dalziel (Belgium) Marc Goossens (United States) Ryan Hunter-Reay	Corvette Daytona Prototype	C	198	DNF
35 DNF	P	90	(United States) VisitFlorida Racing	(United Kingdom) Ryan Dalziel (Belgium) Marc Goossens (United States) Ryan Hunter-Reay	Chevrolet 5.5L V8	C	198	DNF
36 DNF	P	0	(United States) Panoz DeltaWing Racing	(United Kingdom) Andy Meyrick (United Kingdom) Katherine Legge (United States) Sean Rayhall	DeltaWing DWC13	C	169	DNF
36 DNF	P	0	(United States) Panoz DeltaWing Racing	(United Kingdom) Andy Meyrick (United Kingdom) Katherine Legge (United States) Sean Rayhall	Élan (Mazda) 1.9L I4 Turbo	C	169	DNF
37 DNF	P	55	(Japan) Mazda Motorsports	(United States) Tristan Nunez (United States) Jonathan Bomarito (United States) Spencer Pigot	Mazda Prototype	C	114	DNF
37 DNF	P	55	(Japan) Mazda Motorsports	(United States) Tristan Nunez (United States) Jonathan Bomarito (United States) Spencer Pigot	Mazda MZ-2.0T 2.0L I4 Turbo	C	114	DNF
38 DNF	PC	7	(United States) Starworks Motorsport	(Monaco) Stefano Coletti (Canada) James Dayson (United States) Quinlan Lall	Oreca FLM 09	C	50	DNF
38 DNF	PC	7	(United States) Starworks Motorsport	(Monaco) Stefano Coletti (Canada) James Dayson (United States) Quinlan Lall	Chevrolet LS3 6.2L V8	C	50	DNF

Tyre manufacturers
Key
Symbol	Tyre manufacturer
**C**	Continental
**M**	Michelin

== Championship standings after the race ==
Prototype Drivers' Championship standings
Pos.	+/–	Driver	Points
1		(United States) Eric Curran (United States) Dane Cameron	314
2		(Portugal) João Barbosa (Brazil) Christian Fittipaldi	311
3		(United States) Jordan Taylor (United States) Ricky Taylor	309
4	1	(Brazil) Oswaldo Negri Jr.	282
5	1	(Belgium) Marc Goossens	273

PC Drivers' Championship standings
Pos.	+/–	Driver	Points
1		(Venezuela) Alex Popow (Netherlands) Renger van der Zande	355
2		(United States) Robert Alon (United Kingdom) Tom Kimber-Smith	355
3		(South Africa) Stephen Simpson (Canada) Misha Goikhberg	317
4		(United States) James French	305
5	1	(Canada) Kyle Marcelli	274

GTLM Drivers' Championship standings
Pos.	+/–	Driver	Points
1		(United Kingdom) Oliver Gavin (United States) Tommy Milner	345
2		(Australia) Ryan Briscoe (United Kingdom) Richard Westbrook	328
3		(Spain) Antonio García (Denmark) Jan Magnussen	319
4		(New Zealand) Earl Bamber (France) Frédéric Makowiecki	313
5	1	(Finland) Toni Vilander (Italy) Giancarlo Fisichella	305

GTD Drivers' Championship standings
Pos.	+/–	Driver	Points
1		(Italy) Alessandro Balzan (Denmark) Christina Nielsen	332
2		(Netherlands) Jeroen Bleekemolen (United States) Ben Keating	303
3	1	(United States) Bryan Sellers (United States) Madison Snow	293
4	1	(United States) Andrew Davis (United Kingdom) Robin Liddell	290
5		(Germany) Mario Farnbacher (Spain) Alex Riberas	285

- Note: Only the top five positions are included for all sets of standings.

Prototype Teams' Championship standings
Pos.	+/–	Team	Points
1		(United States) No. 31 Action Express Racing	314
2		(United States) No. 5 Action Express Racing	311
3		(United States) No. 10 Wayne Taylor Racing	309
4	1	(United States) No. 60 Michael Shank Racing with Curb-Agajanian	282
5	1	(United States) No. 90 VisitFlorida Racing	273

PC Teams' Championship standings
Pos.	+/–	Team	Points
1		(United States) No. 8 Starworks Motorsport	355
2		(United States) No. 52 PR1/Mathiasen Motorsports	355
3		(United States) No. 38 Performance Tech Motorsports	330
4		(United States) No. 85 JDC-Miller MotorSports	317
5		(United States) No. 20 BAR1 Motorsports	302

GTLM Teams' Championship standings
Pos.	+/–	Team	Points
1		(United States) No. 4 Corvette Racing	345
2		(United States) No. 67 Ford Chip Ganassi Racing	328
3		(United States) No. 3 Corvette Racing	319
4		(United States) No. 912 Porsche North America	313
5	1	(United States) No. 62 Risi Competizione	305

GTD Teams' Championship standings
Pos.	+/–	Team	Points
1		(United States) No. 63 Scuderia Corsa	332
2		(United States) No. 33 Riley Motorsports	303
3	1	(United States) No. 48 Paul Miller Racing	293
4	1	(United States) No. 6 Stevenson Motorsports	290
5		(United States) No. 23 Team Seattle/Alex Job Racing	285

- Note: Only the top five positions are included for all sets of standings.

Prototype Manufacturers' Championship standings
Pos.	+/–	Manufacturer	Points
1		(United States) Chevrolet	338
2		(Japan) Honda	324
3		(Japan) Mazda	304
4		(Germany) BMW	56
5		(United States) Ford	30

GTLM Manufacturers' Championship standings
Pos.	+/–	Manufacturer	Points
1		(United States) Chevrolet	359
2		(United States) Ford	341
3		(Germany) Porsche	330
4	1	(Italy) Ferrari	317
5	1	(Germany) BMW	314

GTD Manufacturers' Championship standings
Pos.	+/–	Manufacturer	Points
1		(Germany) Audi	334
2	1	(Italy) Ferrari	328
3	1	(Germany) Porsche	322
4		(United States) Dodge	321
5		(Germany) BMW	313

- Note: Only the top five positions are included for all sets of standings.
- Note: Bold names include the Drivers', Teams', and Manufactures' Champion respectively.

IMSA SportsCar Championship
Previous race: Lone Star Le Mans	2016 season	Next race: none
