= Dane Cameron =

American racing driver (born 1988)

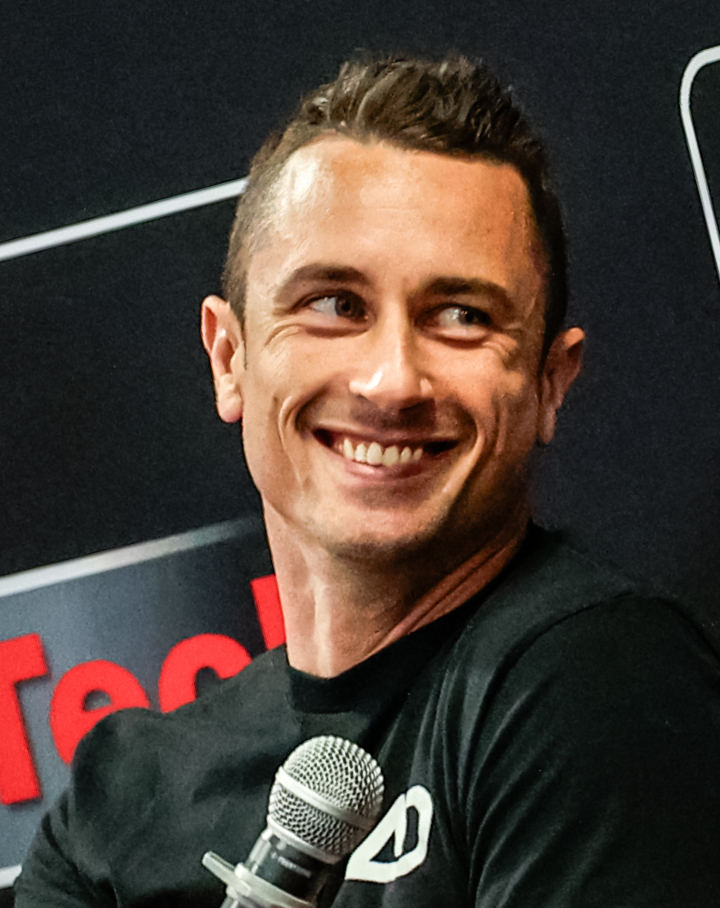
- Cameron at the 2025 SportsCar Grand Prix
- Nationality: (United States) American
- Born: Dane Richard Cameron; October 18, 1988 (age 38) Newport Beach, California, U.S.

WeatherTech SportsCar Championship career
- Debut season: 2014
- Current team: AO Racing
- Categorisation: FIA Gold (until 2022); FIA Platinum (2023–)
- Car number: 99
- Former teams: Porsche Penske Motorsport; Meyer Shank Racing w/ Curb-Agajanian
- Starts: 105
- Championships: 2
- Wins: 18
- Poles: 10
- Best finish: 1st in 2014, 2019, 2024
- Finished last season: 1st (2024)

Previous series
- 2006-2013 2011-2013 2008 2007 2006: Rolex Sports Car Series; American Le Mans Series; Atlantic Championship; Star Mazda Championship; U.S. F2000 National Championship
- Statistics up to date as of February 2, 2021.

Dane Richard Cameron (born October 18, 1988) is an American racing driver from Glen Ellen, California. He won the IMSA WeatherTech SportsCar Championship overall in 2016, 2019 and 2024. He also won the GTD and LMP2 class championships in 2014 and 2025, respectively.

== Early career ==
After karting, Cameron began his auto racing career in 2005 in the Jim Russell Racing School and Formula Russell where he won the championship. In 2006 he competed in the U.S. F2000 National Championship and finished runner-up to J. R. Hildebrand. That fall Cameron won a Team USA Scholarship to participate in the Formula Palmer Audi Autumn Trophy in Europe, which he won.

In 2007, Cameron competed in the Star Mazda Championship and won the title over James Davison on the back of three race wins and only one finish outside the top-ten. With his championship he won a scholarship to race in the Atlantic Championship in 2008. Cameron finished seventh in points with a best performance of finishing second from the pole in the first race at Road America.

== Sportscar career ==
=== Rolex Sports Car Series ===
Cameron turned to sports car racing in 2009 where he drove a Mazda RX-8 in the 2009 Rolex Sports Car Series for Racers Edge Motorsports. He finished 17th in GT class drivers' points with a best finish of third at Watkins Glen International. Cameron had ten different co-drivers in the Racers Edge #30 car throughout the season. In 2010 Cameron made only two Rolex Sports Car Series starts but both were in the top-flight Daytona Prototype class. He drove in the 24 Hours of Daytona for Beyer Racing and the New Jersey Motorsports Park race for Starworks Motorsport. He also made one American Le Mans Series start (the 12 Hours of Sebring) in the LMPC class with Genoa Racing and his team won their class.

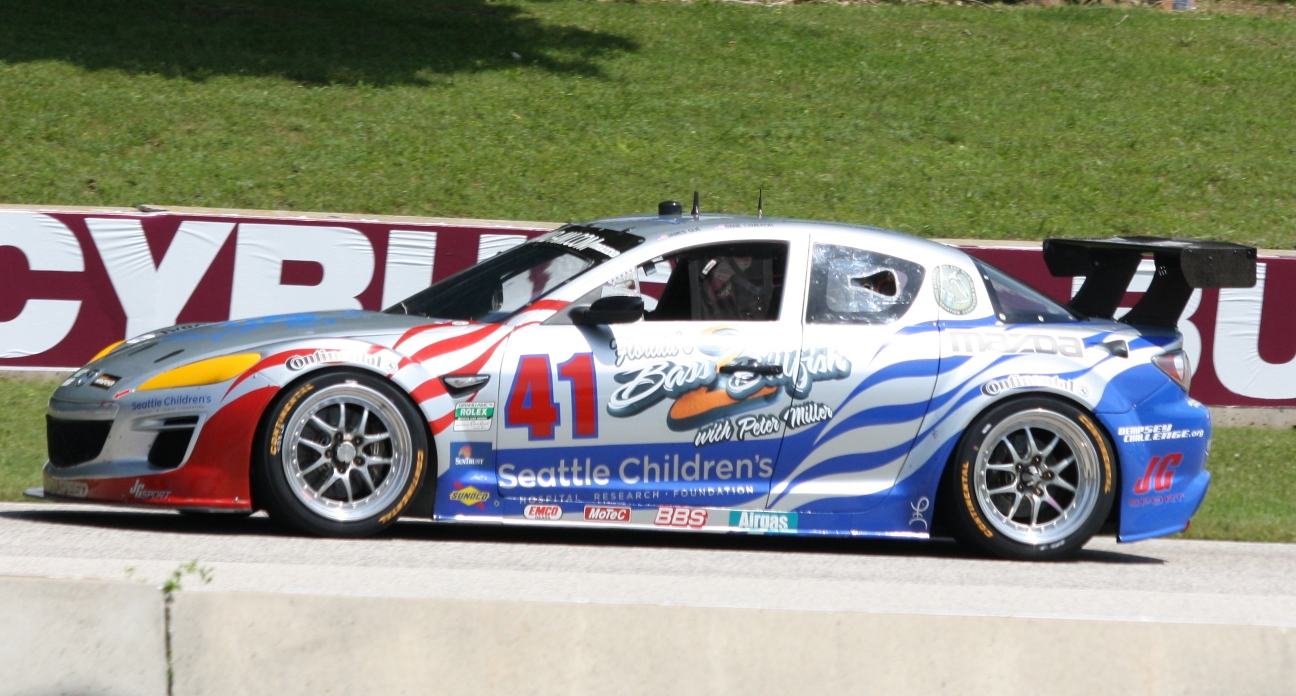
The No. 41 Mazda RX-8 that Cameron drove during the 2011 Rolex Sports Car Series 250 at Road America

In 2011, Cameron competed with Dempsey Racing/Team Seattle in their Rolex GT class Mazda RX-8 with teammate James Gué. They finished fourth in the championship with three third-place finishes and six top-fives. In 2012, he drove Team Sahlen's RX-8 in the same series with Wayne Nonnamaker. He ranked sixth in points with a class win at Mazda Raceway Laguna Seca and three podiums.

Cameron moved up to the Rolex Daytona Prototype class full-time with Team Sahlen in 2013, again sharing ride with Wayne Nonnamaker. With two fourth-place finishes, he finished tenth in the drivers standings. Also, he partnered with eventual LMPC drivers champion Mike Guasch in four rounds of the American Le Mans Series.

=== IMSA SportsCar Championship ===
In the 2014 United SportsCar Championship, Cameron moved to the GTD class to drive a Turner BMW Z4 with Markus Palttala. He claimed four class wins and two third-place finishes in 11 rounds, winning the GTD drivers championship.

Cameron moved to the Prototype class for the 2015 IMSA season, sharing an Action Express Racing Corvette with Eric Curran. He claimed two wins, four podiums and top-five finishes in every race. As a result, he ended third in the drivers standings. Cameron was renewed with the team for 2016 and 2017.

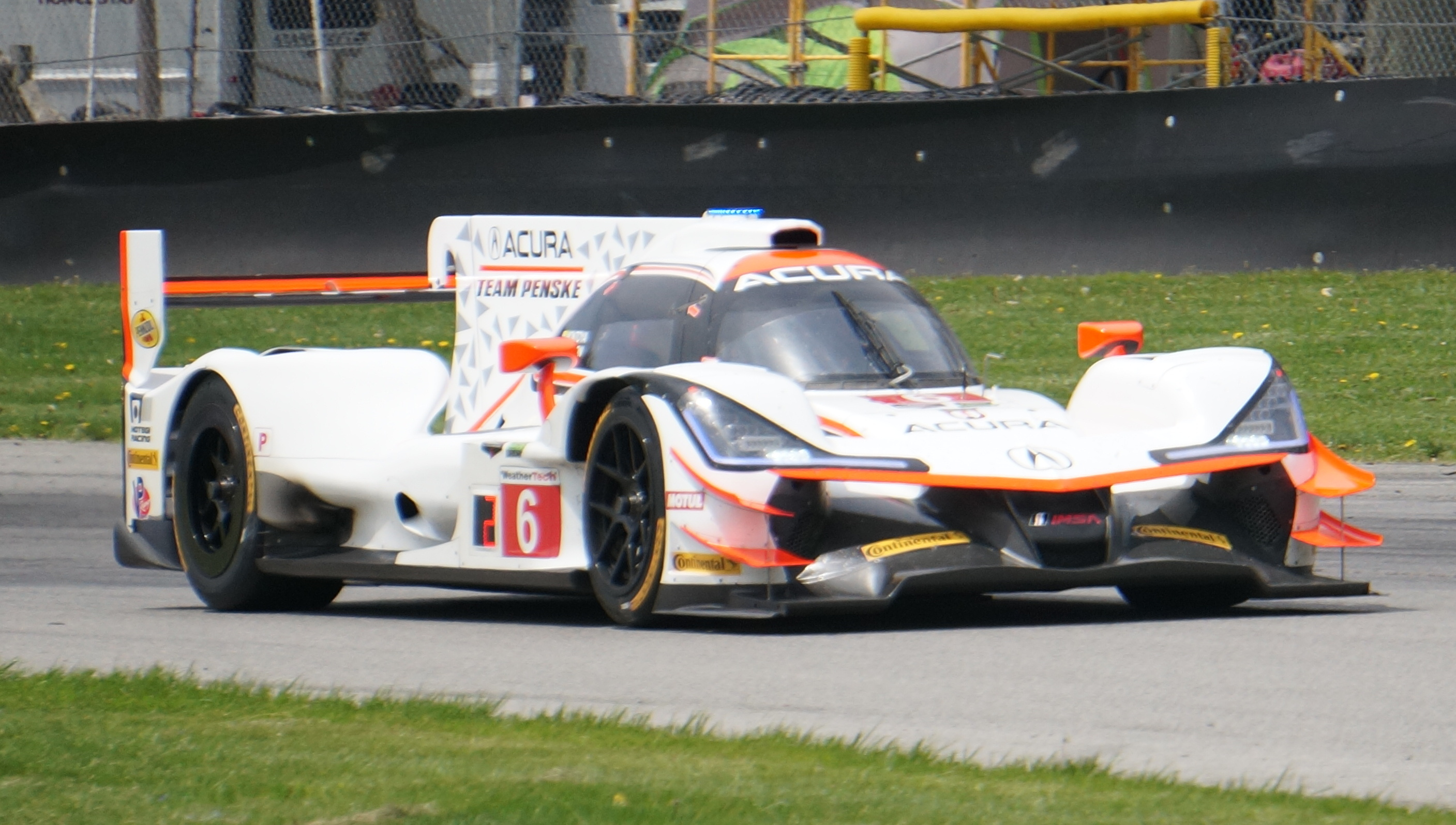
Cameron and Montoya took second during the 2018 Sports Car Challenge of Mid-Ohio

For the 2018 season, Cameron picked up Juan Pablo Montoya as a co-driver at Team Penske. In the second year of the partnership, Cameron, Montoya and Penske claimed the DPi championship. He also earned the highest number of Pro-Am points in the GT World Challenge America, but was excluded from the championship due to an injury-forced co-driver change.

In 2020, Cameron joined Honda Racing Team JAS for Intercontinental GT Challenge events.

== Hypercar career ==
Cameron became a member of the Porsche Penske Motorsport outfit in 2023, where he would drive a Porsche 963 alongside Michael Christensen and Frédéric Makowiecki in the World Endurance Championship.

== Personal life ==
Cameron's father was a racing engineer. Dane is married with two children.

== Complete motorsports results ==
=== Career summary ===
Season	Series	Team	Races	Wins	Poles	F/Laps	Podiums	Points	Position
2006	Formula Ford 2000 Championship Series	Finlay Motorsports	14	2	4	2	9	272	**2nd**
2006	Formula Palmer Audi Autumn Trophy	Team USA Scholarship	6	4	1	?	6	136	**1st**
2007	Star Mazda Championship	JDC MotorSports	12	3	6	?	8	450	**1st**
2008	Atlantic Championship	Lynx Racing	11	0	1	1	2	169	7th
2009	Rolex Sports Car Series - GT	Racers Edge Motorsports	11	0	0	0	1	204	14th
2010	Rolex Sports Car Series - DP	Beyer Racing	2	0	0	0	0	36	37th
2010	Continental Tire Sports Car Challenge - ST	Freedom Autosport	1	0	0	0	0	10	89th
2011	American Le Mans Series - PC	Genoa Racing	1	1	1	1	1	30	14th
2011	Rolex Sports Car Series - GT	Dempsey Racing	12	0	1	0	3	306	4th
2012	American Le Mans Series - PC	Dempsey Racing	1	0	0	1	0	0	NC
2012	American Le Mans Series - P2	Dempsey Racing	2	0	0	0	0	0	NC
2012	Rolex Sports Car Series - GT	Team Sahlen	13	1	0	0	3	324	6th
2013	American Le Mans Series - PC	PR1/Mathiasen Motorsports	4	1	3	3	3	51	12th
2013	Rolex Sports Car Series - DP	Team Sahlen	12	0	2	0	0	269	10th
2014	United SportsCar Championship - GTD	Turner Motorsport	11	4	2	2	6	304	**1st**
2014	United SportsCar Championship - GTLM	Risi Competizione	1	0	0	0	0	23	35th
2014	Pirelli World Challenge - GT	Turner Motorsport	1	0	0	0	0	39	36th
2014	Continental Tire Sports Car Challenge - GS	Tim Bell Racing	11	0	0	0	0	125	30th
2015	United SportsCar Championship - Prototype	Action Express Racing	10	2	0	1	4	304	**3rd**
2015	United SportsCar Championship - GTD	Turner Motorsport	1	1	0	1	1	36	30th
2016	IMSA SportsCar Championship - Prototype	Action Express Racing	10	2	0	3	7	314	**1st**
2017	IMSA SportsCar Championship - Prototype	Whelen Engineering Racing	10	1	0	0	6	291	**2nd**
2017	Pirelli World Challenge - GT	Magnus Racing	2	1	0	0	2	48	39th
2017	Pirelli World Challenge - TC	Turner Motorsport	2	1	0	0	2	46	21st
2017	Intercontinental GT Challenge	RealTime Racing	1	0	0	0	0	12	10th
2018	IMSA SportsCar Championship - Prototype	Acura Team Penske	10	0	1	1	4	251	5th
2019	IMSA SportsCar Championship - DPi	Acura Team Penske	10	3	2	0	7	302	**1st**
2019	Blancpain GT World Challenge America	RealTime Racing	12	1	0	1	2	123	6th
2019	Intercontinental GT Challenge	Honda Team Motul	1	0	0	0	0	0	NC
2020	IMSA SportsCar Championship - DPi	Acura Team Penske	9	0	2	2	3	247	6th
2020	GT World Challenge Europe Endurance Cup	Team Honda Racing	1	0	0	0	0	5	26th
2020	Intercontinental GT Challenge	Team Honda Racing	3	0	0	0	1	19	12th
2021	IMSA SportsCar Championship - DPi	Meyer Shank Racing w/ Curb-Agajanian	10	0	0	1	2	2946	5th
2022	FIA World Endurance Championship - LMP2	Team Penske	3	0	0	0	0	42	10th
2023	IMSA SportsCar Championship - GTP	Porsche Penske Motorsport	2	0	0	0	1	580	17th
2023	FIA World Endurance Championship - Hypercar	Porsche Penske Motorsport	7	0	0	0	0	61	7th
2023	24 Hours of Le Mans - Hypercar	Porsche Penske Motorsport	1	0	0	0	0	N/A	9th
2024	IMSA SportsCar Championship - GTP	Porsche Penske Motorsport	9	2	0	0	7	2982	**1st**
2024	24 Hours of Le Mans - Hypercar	Porsche Penske Motorsport	Reserve driver						
2025	IMSA SportsCar Championship - LMP2	AO Racing	7	2	2	1	3	2254	**1st**
2025	European Le Mans Series - LMP2 Pro-Am	AO by TF	6	1	0	0	5	100	**1st**
2025	24 Hours of Le Mans - LMP2 Pro-Am	AO by TF	1	1	0	0	1	N/A	**1st**
2026	IMSA SportsCar Championship - LMP2	AO Racing	7	1	1	1	2	2087	4th
2026	European Le Mans Series - LMP2	AO by TF	6	0	1	0	2	45	8th
2026	24 Hours of Le Mans - LMP2 Pro-Am	AO by TF	1	0	0	0	1	N/A	**3rd**

=== American Open-Wheel racing results ===
(key) (Races in bold indicate pole position, races in italics indicate fastest race lap)

==== U.S. F2000 National Championship ====
Year	Entrant	1	2	3	4	5	6	7	8	9	10	11	12	13	14	Pos	Points
2006	Finlay Motorsports	**ATL1**; 2	ATL2; 2	MOH1; 26	MOH2; 3	PIR1; 8	PIR2; 9	**CLE1**; 2	CLE2; 1	TOR1; 2	TOR2; 2	MOH3; 2	**MOH4**; 17	ROA1; 1	**ROA2**; 11	**2nd**	**272**

==== Star Mazda Championship ====
Year	Team	1	2	3	4	5	6	7	8	9	10	11	12	Rank	Points
2007	JDC MotorSports	SEB; 4	HOU; 1	VIR; 1	MMP; 4	POR; 17	CLE; 2	TOR; 1	RAM; 2	TRO; 2	MOS; 3	RAT; 8	LAG; 2	**1st**	**450**

==== Atlantic Championship ====
Year	Team	1	2	3	4	5	6	7	8	9	10	11	Rank	Points
2008	Lynx Racing	LBH; 11	LS; 17	MTT; 5	EDM1; 4	EDM2; 5	ROA1; 2	ROA2; 17	TRR; 5	NJ; 19	UTA; 3	ATL; 13	**7th**	**169**

=== American Le Mans Series results ===
(key) (Races in bold indicate pole position; results in italics indicate fastest lap)

Year	Entrant	Class	Make	Engine	1	2	3	4	5	6	7	8	9	10	Pos.	Points	Ref
2011	Genoa Racing	PC	Oreca FLM09	Chevrolet LS3 6.2 L V8	SEB; 1	LBH	LRP	MOS	MOH	ELK	BAL	LAG	PET		14th	30	
2012	Dempsey Racing	PC	Oreca FLM09	Chevrolet LS3 6.2 L V8	SEB; Ret	LBH	LAG	LRP	MOS						NC	0	
2012	Dempsey Racing	LMP2	Lola B12/87	Judd-BMW HK 3.6 L V8						MOH; 4	ELK	BAL	VIR	PET; Ret	NC	0	
2013	PR1/Mathiasen Motorsports	PC	Oreca FLM09	Chevrolet LS3 6.2 L V8	SEB	LBH	LAG	LRP	MOS	ELK	BAL; 3	COA; 2	VIR; 5	PET; 5	12th	51	

=== Complete IMSA SportsCar Championship results ===
(key) (Races in bold indicate pole position; results in italics indicate fastest lap)

Year	Entrant	Class	Chassis	Engine	1	2	3	4	5	6	7	8	9	10	11	Rank	Points	Ref
2014	Turner Motorsport	GTD	BMW Z4 GT3	BMW 4.4 L V8 V8	DAY; 7	SEB; 7	LGA; 1	BEL; 6	WGL; 1	MOS; 3	IMS; 15	ELK; 1	VIR; 1	AUS; 3	ATL; 4	1st	304	
2014	Risi Competizione	GTLM	Ferrari 458 Italia GT2	Ferrari F142 4.5 L V8	DAY	SEB	LBH	LGA; 9	WGL	MOS	IMS	ELK	VIR	AUS	ATL	35th	23	
2015	Action Express Racing	P	Coyote Corvette DP	Chevrolet 5.5L V8	DAY; 4	SEB; 5	LBH; 4	LGA; 5	BEL; 1	WGL; 4	MOS; 2	ELK; 1	AUS; 5	ATL; 3		3rd	304	
2015	Turner Motorsport	GTD	BMW Z4 GT3	BMW 4.4 L V8	DAY	SEB	LGA	BEL	WGL	LIM; 1	ELK	VIR	AUS	ATL		30th	36	
2016	Action Express Racing	P	Coyote Corvette DP	Chevrolet 5.5L V8	DAY; 6	SEB; 2	LBH; 3	LGA; 3	BEL; 6	WGL; 2	MOS; 1	ELK; 1	AUS; 2	ATL; 4		1st	314	
2017	Whelen Engineering Racing	P	Cadillac DPi-V.R	Cadillac DPi-V.R	DAY; 6	SEB; 3	LBH; 8	AUS; 2	BEL; 2	WGL; 10	MOS; 1	ELK; 4	LGA; 2	ATL; 2		2nd	291	
2018	Acura Team Penske	P	Acura ARX-05	Acura AR35TT 3.5 L Turbo V6	DAY; 10	SEB; 14	LBH; 5	MOH; 2	BEL; 3	WGL; 3	MOS; 10	ELK; 5	LGA; 3	ATL; 13		5th	251	
2019	Acura Team Penske	DPi	Acura ARX-05	Acura AR35TT 3.5 L Turbo V6	DAY; 6	SEB; 9	LBH; 3	MOH; 1	BEL; 1	WGL; 3	MOS; 3	ELK; 2	LGA; 1	ATL; 4		1st	302	
2020	Acura Team Penske	DPi	Acura ARX-05	Acura AR35TT 3.5 L Turbo V6	DAY; 4	DAY; 4	SEB; 6	ELK; 8	ATL; 6	**MOH**; 7	**PET**; 3	**LGA**; 2	SEB; 2			6th	247	
2021	Meyer Shank Racing w/ Curb-Agajanian	DPi	Acura ARX-05	Acura AR35TT 3.5 L Turbo V6	DAY; 4	SEB; 3	MOH; 6	DET; 6	WGL; 2	WGL; 6	ELK; 5	LGA; 4	LBH; 6	PET; 6		5th	2946	
2023	Porsche Penske Motorsport	GTP	Porsche 963	Porsche 9RD 4.6 L V8	DAY; 8	SEB; 3	LBH	MON	WGL	MOS	ELK	IMS	PET			17th	580	
2024	Porsche Penske Motorsport	GTP	Porsche 963	Porsche 9RD 4.6 L V8	DAY; 1	SEB; 3	LBH; 3	LGA; 3	DET; 4	WGL; 1	ELK; 2	IMS; 9	ATL; 3			1st	2982	
2025	AO Racing	LMP2	Oreca 07	Gibson GK428 4.2 L V8	DAY; 5	SEB; 7	**WGL**; 2	**MOS**; 1	ELK; 1	IMS; 5	PET; 6					1st	2254	
2026	AO Racing	LMP2	Oreca 07	Gibson GK428 4.2 L V8	DAY; 5	SEB; 6	WGL; 1	MOS; 3	ELK; 4	IMS; 8	PET; 10					4th	2087	

=== Complete FIA World Endurance Championship results ===
(key) (Races in bold indicate pole position; races in italics indicate fastest lap)

Year	Entrant	Class	Car	Engine	1	2	3	4	5	6	7	Rank	Points
2022	Team Penske	LMP2	Oreca 07	Gibson GK428 4.2 L V8	SEB; 8	SPA; 4	LMS; 4	MNZ	FUJ	BHR		10th	42
2023	Porsche Penske Motorsport	Hypercar	Porsche 963	Porsche 4.6 L Turbo V8	SEB; 5	PRT; 10	SPA; 4	LMS; 16	MNZ; 4	FUJ; 36	BHR; 7	7th	61

=== 24 Hours of Le Mans results ===
Year	Team	Co-Drivers	Car	Class	Laps	Pos.	Class Pos.
2022	(United States) Team Penske	(France) Emmanuel Collard (Brazil) Felipe Nasr	Oreca 07-Gibson	LMP2	368	9th	5th
2023	(Germany) Porsche Penske Motorsport	(Denmark) Michael Christensen (France) Frédéric Makowiecki	Porsche 963	Hypercar	325	16th	9th
2025	(United States) AO by TF	(Switzerland) Louis Delétraz (United States) P. J. Hyett	Oreca 07-Gibson	LMP2	366	20th	**3rd**
2025	(United States) AO by TF	(Switzerland) Louis Delétraz (United States) P. J. Hyett	Oreca 07-Gibson	LMP2 Pro-Am	366	20th	**1st**
2026	(United States) AO by TF	(Australia) James Allen (United States) P. J. Hyett	Oreca 07-Gibson	LMP2	356	24th	10th
2026	(United States) AO by TF	(Australia) James Allen (United States) P. J. Hyett	Oreca 07-Gibson	LMP2 Pro-Am	356	24th	**3rd**

=== Complete European Le Mans Series results ===
(key) (Races in bold indicate pole position; results in italics indicate fastest lap)

Year	Entrant	Class	Chassis	Engine	1	2	3	4	5	6	Rank	Points
2025	AO by TF	LMP2 Pro-Am	Oreca 07	Gibson GK428 4.2 L V8	CAT; 8	**LEC**; 2	IMO; 1	SPA; 3	**SIL**; 2	ALG; 2	1st	100
2026	AO by TF	LMP2 Pro-Am	Oreca 07	Gibson GK428 4.2 L V8	CAT; 10	**LEC**; 2	IMO; 9	SPA; 3	SIL; 6	ALG; Ret	8th	45

Sporting positions
Preceded by Adrian Carrio	Star Mazda Championship; Champion; 2007	Succeeded by John Edwards
Preceded by João Barbosa; Christian Fittipaldi	WeatherTech SportsCar Championship; Champion; 2016; With: Eric Curran	Succeeded by Jordan Taylor; Ricky Taylor
Preceded by Eric Curran; Felipe Nasr	WeatherTech SportsCar Championship; Champion; 2019; With: Juan Pablo Montoya	Succeeded by Hélio Castroneves; Ricky Taylor
