= James French (racing driver) =

American auto racing driver

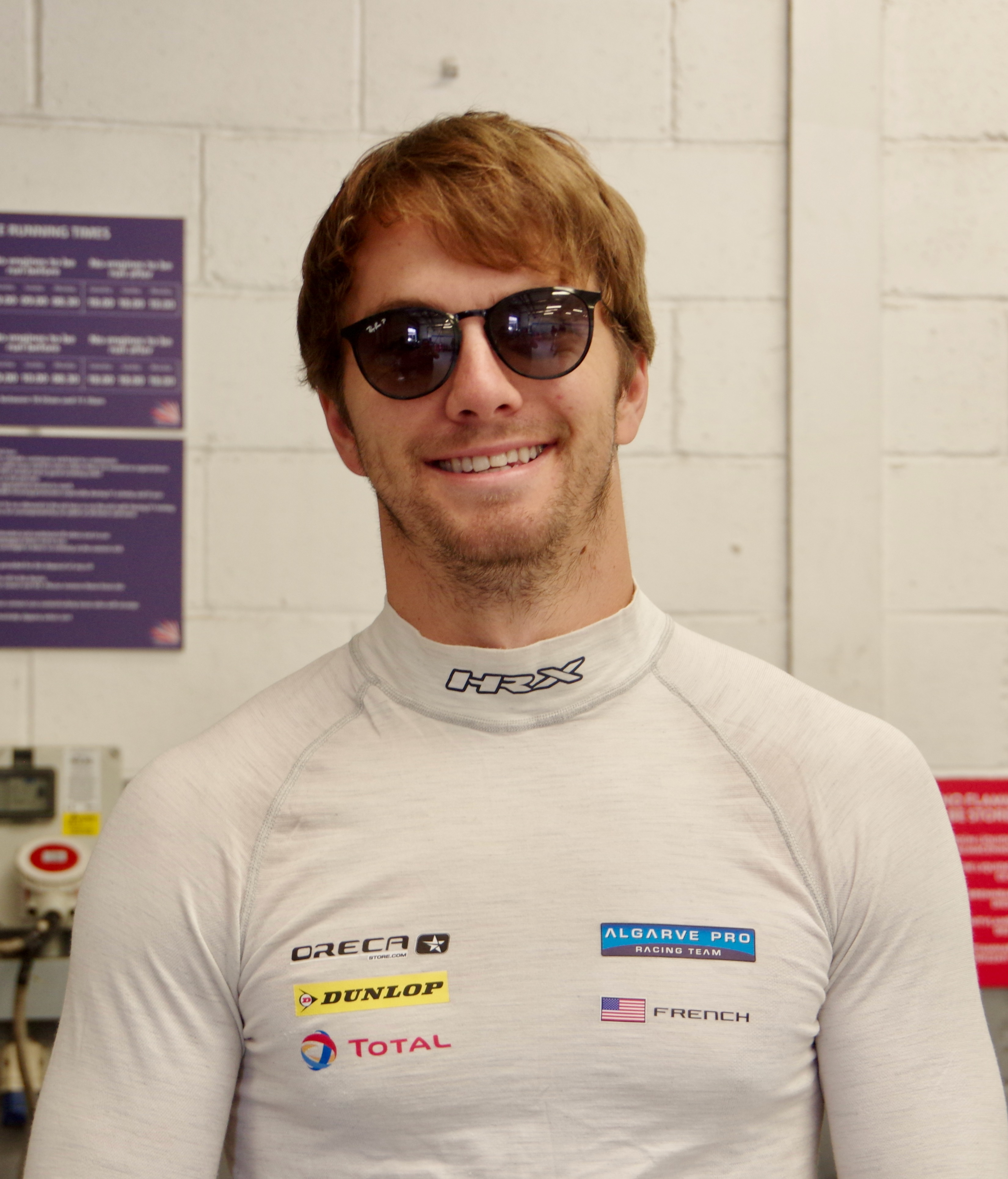
- French in 2019
- Nationality: (United States) American
- Born: May 20, 1992 (age 34) Sheboygan, Wisconsin, U.S.

United SportsCar Championship career
- Debut season: 2014
- Current team: Performance Tech Motorsports
- Categorisation: FIA Silver
- Starts: 46
- Championships: 1 (2017)
- Wins: 9
- Podiums: 22
- Poles: 6
- Fastest laps: 8
- Best finish: 1st in 2017

Previous series
- 2009–2013: SCCA C Sports Racer

NASCAR O'Reilly Auto Parts Series career
- 1 race run over 1 year
- 2018 position: 82nd
- Best finish: 82nd (2018)
- First race: 2018 Johnsonville 180 (Road America)
Wins	Top tens	Poles
0	0	0
- Statistics up to date as of November 17, 2018.

James French (born May 21, 1992) is an American professional racing driver.

== Racing career ==
Growing up in Wisconsin French started karting at age five at the Road America Motorplex. In his final season at the Road America Kart Club French finished second in the 80cc Shifter class.

=== Club racing ===
French made his debut in the C Sports Racer class at Road America in May 2008. He also raced against his father Brian in the Central Division SCCA championship. The father-son duo also raced at the June Sprints with Brian winning the class, and James finishing in second place. The following season, James won the championship in a Swift 014.a with added bodywork. The younger French won also the June Sprints and placed third at the prestigious SCCA National Championship Runoffs.

In 2010, French ran a partial Central Division SCCA club championship in both the CSR and Formula Atlantic classes. He also competed in the SVRA at Road America in a Ralt RT41. The following season, French won again the Cen-Div CSR championship. His strong result in the divisional championship earned him a third place in the SCCA Majors Tour. He also finished third at the June Sprints.

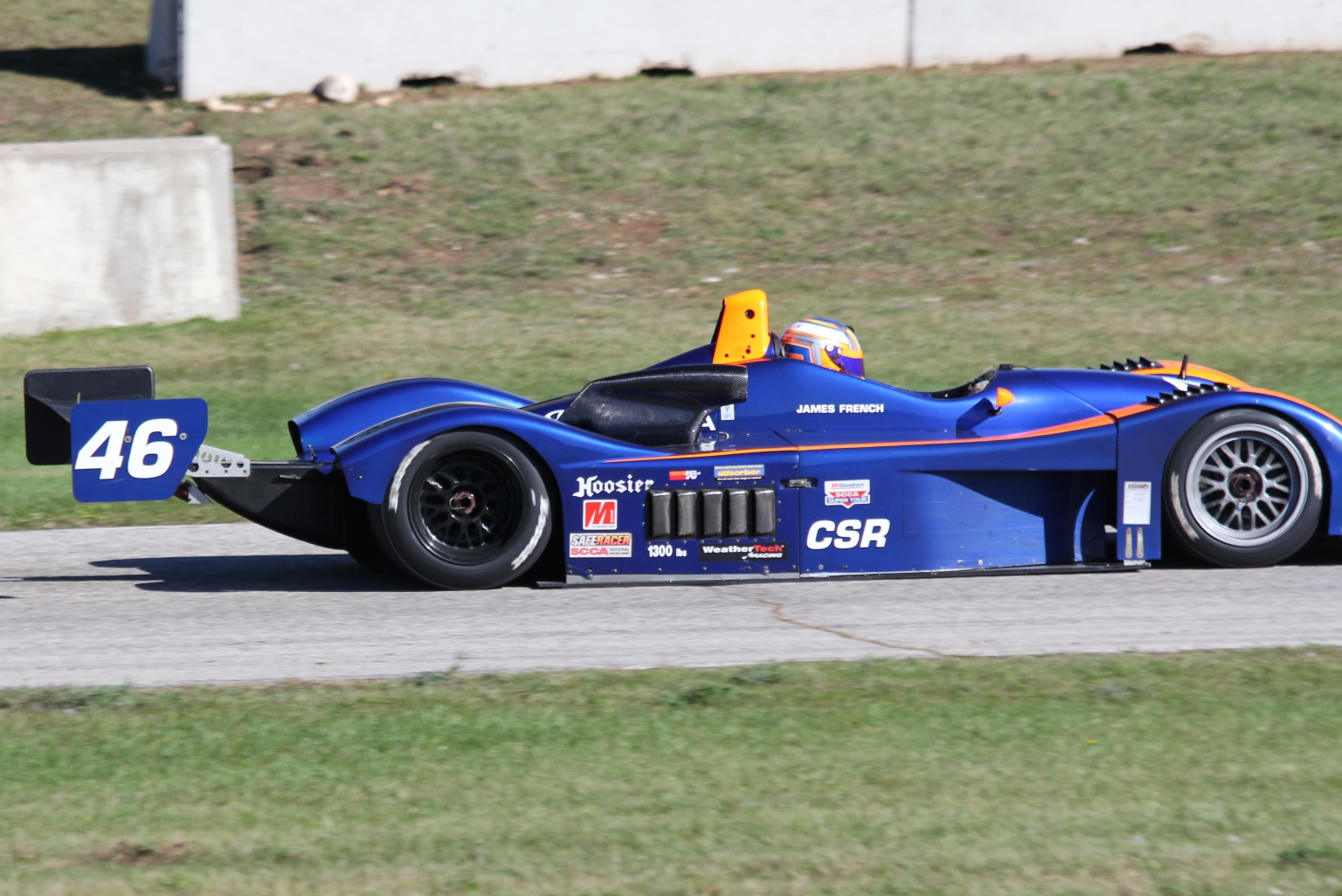
French racing to a third-place finish in C Sport Racer at Road America during the 2013 SCCA National Championship Runoffs

French again repeated his divisional championship in 2012. He did not finish on the podium in the Majors Tour. He again won the June Sprints in 2014. But as he did not win the Central Division championship, he could not compete for the Majors Tour title. French competed at the SVRA Spring Vintage Festival winning his race in a Jordan 197.

=== Sportscar racing ===
French first raced in the American Le Mans Series in 2011. Competing in the LMPC class, French ran one race with Intersport Racing. In 2012, he ran again one race, this time landing on the podium. At the 2012 Road Race Showcase, French, Kyle Marcelli and Chapman Ducote finished third in class. For 2013, French ran three races with BAR1 Motorsports. At the season finale, the 2013 Petit Le Mans, French, Tomy Drissi and Rusty Mitchell finished third in class.

For 2014, French joined Performance Tech Motorsports for the last five races of the season. He scored a second place at Virginia International Raceway with teammate David Ostella. The following season, he raced a full season in the United SportsCar Championship. The team failed to finish at the 2015 24 Hours of Daytona. However, he scored three consecutive third-place finishes after the season opener. He later scored another two podium finishes securing the sixth place in the championship.

=== Indy Lights ===
In November 2015, French tested a Dallara IL-15 with Schmidt Peterson Motorsports. He tested at Circuit of the Americas alongside Heamin Choi. During the Chris Griffis Memorial Test, French was faster than Choi during all the sessions. During the 2016 season, French made his race debut in Indy Lights. As Belardi Auto Racing driver Felix Rosenqvist had other obligations, French replaced the Swede at the Road America round of the championship. French qualified twelfth in a field of fourteen. In both races, he worked his way up to eighth place.

=== Stock car racing ===
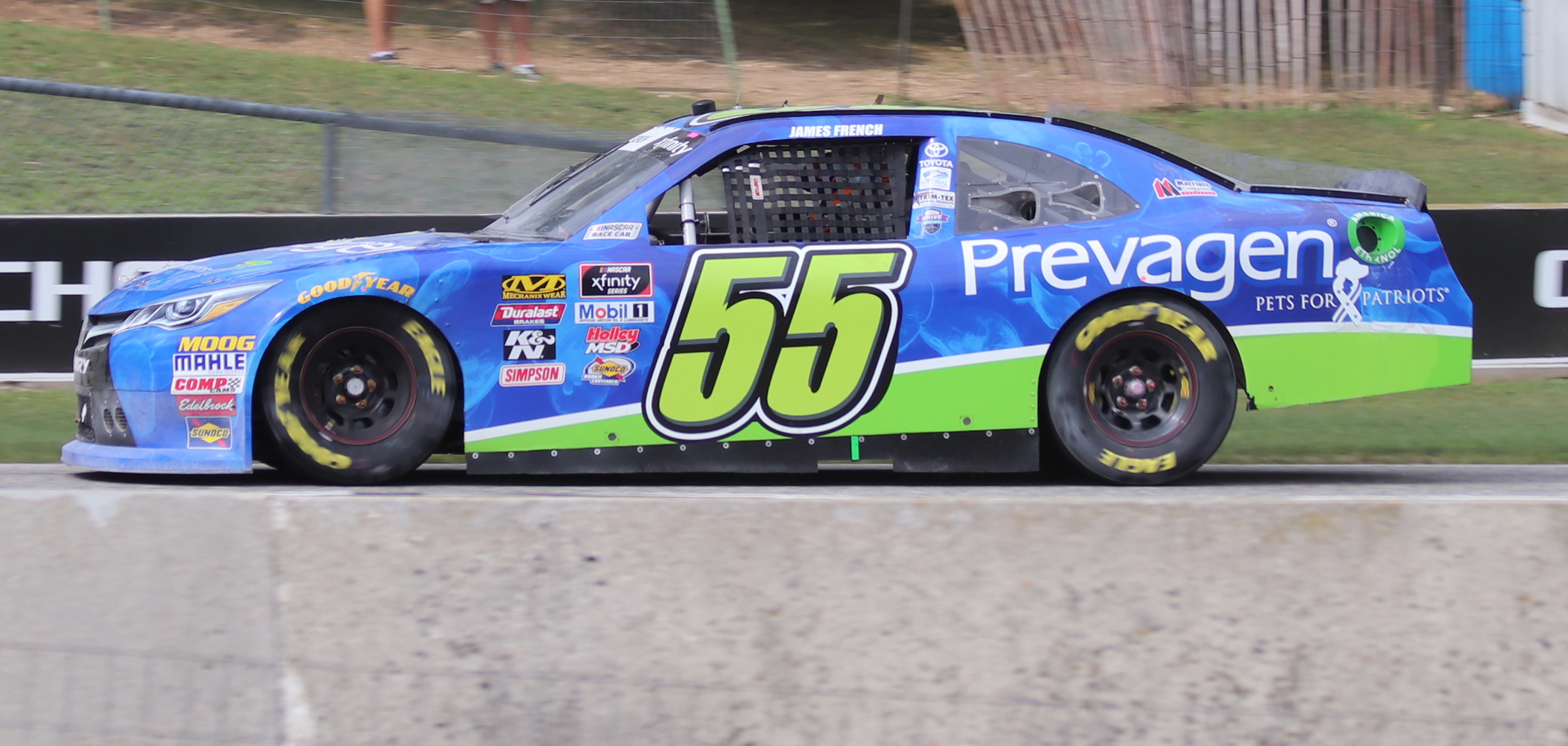
French racing in 2018 during his first NASCAR start at Road America

In August 2018, French joined JP Motorsports for his NASCAR Xfinity Series debut at Road America.

== Racing record ==
=== SCCA National Championship Runoffs ===
Year	Track	Car	Engine	Class	Finish	Start	Status
2009	Road America	Swift 014.a	Toyota	CSR	3	3	Running
2010	Road America	Swift 014.a	Toyota	CSR	3	4	Running
2011	Road America	Swift 014.a	Toyota	CSR	4	4	Running
2012	Road America	Swift 014.a	Toyota	CSR	8	5	DNF
2013	Road America	Swift 014.a	Toyota	CSR	3	6	Running
2020	Road America	Swift 014.a	Toyota	Prototype 1	1	1	Running
2021	Indianapolis Motor Speedway	Ralt RT41	Toyota	Formula Atlantic	1	1	Running
2024	Road America	Ralt RT41	Toyota	Formula Atlantic	DNF	5	Retired
2024	Road America	Ligier JS53	Honda	Prototype 1	DNS	12	Retired

=== American open-wheel racing results ===
(key) (Races in bold indicate pole position, races in italics indicate fastest race lap)

==== Indy Lights ====
Year	Team	1	2	3	4	5	6	7	8	9	10	11	12	13	14	15	16	17	18	Rank	Points
2016	Belardi Auto Racing	STP	STP	PHX	ALA	ALA	IMS	IMS	INDY	RDA; 8	RDA; 8	IOW	TOR	TOR	MOH	MOH	WGL	LAG	LAG	20th	26

=== Xfinity Series ===
NASCAR Xfinity Series results
Year	Team	No.	Make	1	2	3	4	5	6	7	8	9	10	11	12	13	14	15	16	17	18	19	20	21	22	23	24	25	26	27	28	29	30	31	32	33	NXSC	Pts	Ref
2018	JP Motorsports	55	Toyota	DAY	ATL	LVS	PHO	CAL	TEX	BRI	RCH	TAL	DOV	CLT	POC	MCH	IOW	CHI	DAY	KEN	NHA	IOW	GLN	MOH	BRI	ROA; 38	DAR	IND	LVS	RCH	CLT	DOV	KAN	TEX	PHO	HOM	82nd	1	

^{*} Season still in progress
^{1} Ineligible for series points

=== Complete WeatherTech SportsCar Championship ===
Year	Entrant	Class	Chassis	Engine	1	2	3	4	5	6	7	8	9	10	11	Rank	Points
2014	Performance Tech Motorsports	PC	Oreca FLM09	LS3 6.2 L V8	DAY	SEB	LGA	KAN	WGL	IMS; 4	ELK; 6	VIR; 2	AUS; 10	ATL; 10		15th	111
2015	Performance Tech Motorsports	PC	Oreca FLM09	LS3 6.2 L V8	DAY; 7	SEB; 3	LGA; 3	**BEL**; 3	WGL; 7	**MOS**; 7	LIM; 7	**ELK**; **2**	AUS; 3	ATL; DNS		6th	233
2016	Performance Tech Motorsports	PC	Oreca FLM09	LS3 6.2 L V8	DAY; 6	SEB; 5	**LBH**; 3	LGA; 4	BEL; 4	WGL; 2	MOS; 4	LIM; 3	ELK; 3	**AUS**; 3	PET; 2	4th	305
2017	Performance Tech Motorsports	PC	Oreca FLM09	LS3 6.2 L V8	DAY; 1	SEB; 1	AUS; 1	DET; 1	WAT; 1	MOS; 1	ELK; 1	PET; 3				1st	283
2018	Performance Tech Motorsports	P	Oreca 07	Gibson GK428 4.2 L V8	DAY; 8	SEB; 13	LBH; 14	MOH; 11	BEL; 14	WGL; 14	MOS; DNS	ELK	LGA	PET; 14		21st	112
2019	Performance Tech Motorsports	LMP2	Oreca 07	Gibson GK428 4.2 L V8	DAY	SEB	MOH	WGL	MOS	**ELK**; 2	LGA	PET				12th	32
2020	Performance Tech Motorsports	LMP2	Oreca 07	Gibson GK428 4.2 L V8	DAY	SEB	ELK; 2	ATL	PET	LGA	SEB					16th	32
2021	Tower Motorsport by Starworks	LMP2	Oreca 07	Gibson GK428 4.2 L V8	DAY	SEB	WGL; 4	WGL	ELK	LGA	PET; 1					9th	686
2022	Performance Tech Motorsports	LMP3	Ligier JS P320	Nissan VK56DE 5.6 L V8	DAY	SEB	MOH	WGL	MOS	ELK; 6	PET					31st	276
2023	MRS GT-Racing	LMP3	Ligier JS P320	Nissan VK56DE 5.6 L V8	DAY; 8†	SEB	WGL	MOS	ELK	IMS	PET					NC†	0†

^{†} Points only counted towards the Michelin Endurance Cup, and not the overall LMP3 Championship.

Sporting positions
Preceded by Alex Popow; Renger van der Zande	WeatherTech SportsCar Championship; PC Champion; 2017; With: Pato O'Ward	Succeeded by None (Class discontinued)
Preceded by Tom Kimber-Smith; José Gutiérrez; Robert Alon	North American Endurance Cup; PC Champion; 2017; With: Pato O'Ward & Kyle Masson	Succeeded by None (Class discontinued)
Preceded by Paul di Resta; Phil Hanson	Asian Le Mans Series; LMP2 Champion; 2019–20; With: Roman Rusinov & Leonard Hoogenboom	Succeeded by René Binder; Ferdinand von Habsburg; Yifei Ye
