= C Sports Racer =

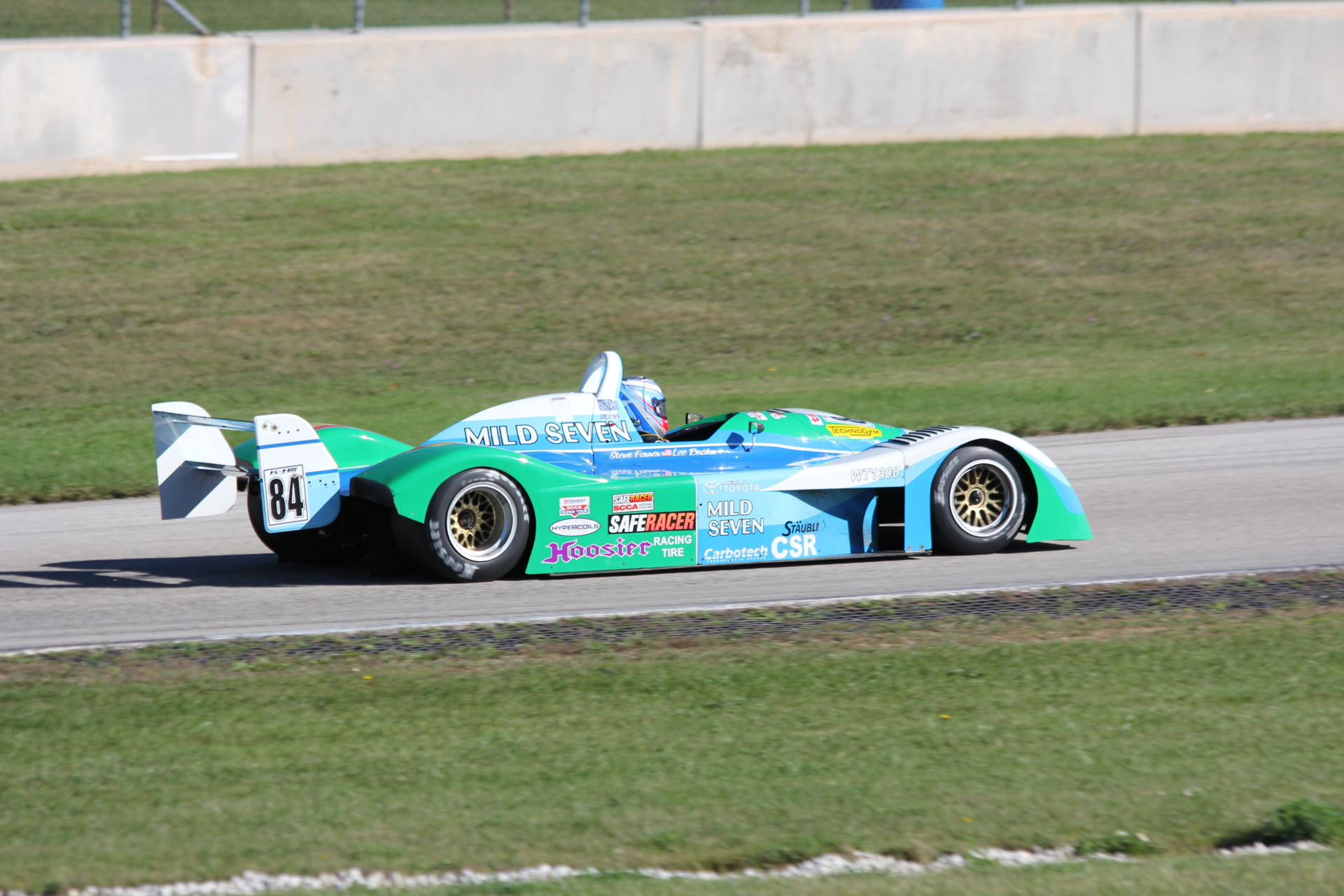
Steve Forrer racing to his CSR win at the 2013 SCCA National Championship Runoffs

C Sports Racer (CSR) now known as Prototype 1 (P1) is a class in the Sports Car Club of America. it consists of open top prototype style cars. The maximum displacement is 1615cc, in a 2 valve crossflow engine, with a minimum weight of 1300lbs w/driver. Two cycle or 4 valve/4 cycle motors between 850cc and 1300cc are permitted with a minimum weight of 1200lbs. Supercharging and turbocharging are permitted within limits, and with a maximum displacement of 765cc. Some CSRs are Formula Atlantic or Formula SCCA cars converted by adding bodywork to the chassis.

== C Sports Racer at the SCCA National Championship Runoffs ==
Year	Driver	Car	Engine
C Modified
1954	(United States) Jim Kimberly	Ferrari 4.5	
1955	(United States) Sherwood Johnston	Ferrari/Jaguar D-Type	
1956	(United States) Walt Hansgen	Jaguar D-Type	
1957	(United States) Walt Hansgen	Jaguar D-Type	
1958	(United States) Walt Hansgen	Lister	Jaguar
1959	(United States) Walt Hansgen	Lister	Jaguar
1960	(United States) Richard Thompson	Chevrolet Corvette	Chevrolet
1961	(United States) Peter Harrison	Lister	Chevrolet
1962	(United States) Harry Heuer	Chaparral I	Chevrolet
1963	(United States) Harry Heuer	Chaparral I	Chevrolet
1964	(United States) Ed Lowther	Huffaker Genie Mk. 10	Ford
1965	(United States) Joe Starkey	McLaren-Elva	
C Sports Racer
1966	(United States) Ralph Salyer	McKee	Oldsmobile
1967	(United States) Jerry Hansen	Lola	Chevrolet
1968	(United States) Mario Whittington	Lotus 23	Ford
1969	(United States) Dan Carmichael	Lotus 23B	Ford
1970	(United States) Dan Carmichael	Lotus 23B	Ford
1971	(United States) Tom Evans	Gardner	Alfa Romeo
1972	(United States) William Holbrook	Royale	Ford
1973	(United States) Eric Kerman	Arachnid	Ford
1974	(United States) Samuel Gilliland	Arachnid 3	Ford
1975	(United States) Jim Trueman	Bobsy SR6	Ford
1976	(United States) Fred Stevenson	Bobsy SR6	Ford
1977	(United States) Giuseppe Castellano	Lola T498	Ford
1978	(United States) Jeff Miller	Wynnfurst Lola	
1979	(United States) Tom Foster	Tiga	Ford
1980	(United States) Fred Schilpin	Lola T496	Ford
1981	(United States) Tom Foster	Tiga SC81	Ford
1982	(United States) Terry McKenna	Argo JM4 Ocelot	Volkswagen
1983	(United States) Charles Billington	Tracer TR2	Ford
1984	(United States) Tom Foster	Tracer TR2	Ford
1985	(United States) Tom Foster	Tracer TR2	Volkswagen
1986	(United States) Al Beasley	Bease Decker 2	
1987	(United States) Tom Foster	Tracer TR2	Ford
1988	(United States) Tom Foster	Tracer TR2	Ford
1989	(United States) Tom Foster	Tracer TR2	Ford
1990	(United States) Charles Billington	Tracer TR2	Ford
1991	(United States) Charles Billington	Tracer TR2	Ford
1992	(United States) Charles Billington	Tracer TR2	Ford
1993	(United States) Charles Billington	Tracer TR2	Ford
1994	(United States) Greg Harrington		Toyota
1995	(United States) Alexander Smith	Pratt & Miller RM2	
1996	(United States) Jeff Miller	Wynnfurst	
1997	(United States) Charles Billington	Tracer TR2	Ford
1998	(United States) Ben Beasley	Beasley B2	
1999	(United States) Ben Beasley	Beasley B2	
2000	(United States) Alvin Beasley Jr.	Beasley B2	
2001	(United States) Ben Beasley	Beasley B7	
2002	(United States) Ben Beasley	Beasley B7	
2003	(United States) John Mirro	Ralt	
2004	(United States) Tony Loniewski	Swift Viking	Toyota
2005	(United States) Arnstein Loyning	Swift Viking	Toyota
2006	(United States) Peter Hans	Swift 014.a	Toyota
2007	(United States) Peter Hans	Swift 014.a	Toyota
2008	(United States) J.R. Osborne	Stohr WF1	Suzuki
2009	(United States) Matt Miller	Élan DP02	Mazda
2010	(United States) Steve Forrer	Ralt RT41	Toyota
2011	(United States) Steve Forrer	Ralt RT41	Toyota
2012	(United States) Steve Forrer	Ralt RT41	Toyota
2013	(United States) Lee Alexander	Stohr WF1	Suzuki
Prototype 1
2014	(United States) Chris Farrell	Stohr WF1	Suzuki
2015	(United States) Gianpaolo Ciancimino	Stohr WF1	Suzuki
2016	(United States) James Devenport	Norma M20-FC	Honda
2017	(United States) Jonathan Eriksen	Stohr WF1	Suzuki
2018	(United States) James Devenport	Norma M20-FC	Honda
2019	(United States) Todd Slusher	Élan DP02	Mazda
2020	(United States) James French	Swift 014	Toyota
2021	(United States) Lee Alexander	Stohr WF1	Suzuki
2022	(United States) Chip Romer	Elan	Mazda
2023	(United States) Todd Vanacore	Élan DP02	Mazda
2024	(United States) Matt Romer	Élan DP02	Mazda
