= 2016 Mazda Prototype Lites season =

2016 IMSA Lites season

Seasons
- ← 2015 2017 →

The 2016 Mazda Prototype Lites season was the eleventh season of the IMSA Lites championship. The championship featured two classes, L1 and L2. During the season there were few L2 entrants, therefore no championship points were awarded.

== Calendar and results ==
Round		Circuit	Date	Pole position	Fastest lap	Winning driver	Supporting
1	R1	(United States) Sebring International Raceway	17 March	(United States) Clark Toppe	(United States) Clark Toppe	(United States) Clark Toppe	2016 12 Hours of Sebring
1	R2	(United States) Sebring International Raceway	18 March	(United States) Austin Versteeg	(United States) Austin Versteeg	(United States) Austin Versteeg	2016 12 Hours of Sebring
2	R1	(United States) Watkins Glen International	3 July	(United States) Austin Versteeg	(United States) Austin Versteeg	(United States) Austin Versteeg	2016 6 Hours of the Glen
2	R2	(United States) Watkins Glen International	3 July	(United States) Austin Versteeg	(United States) Austin Versteeg	(United States) Austin Versteeg	2016 6 Hours of the Glen
2	R3	(United States) Watkins Glen International	3 July	(United States) Austin Versteeg	(United States) Austin Versteeg	(United States) Austin Versteeg	2016 6 Hours of the Glen
3	R1	(Canada) Canadian Tire Motorsport Park	9 July	(United States) Clark Toppe	(United States) Clark Toppe	(United States) Clark Toppe	2016 SportsCar Grand Prix
3	R2	(Canada) Canadian Tire Motorsport Park	10 July	(United States) Austin Versteeg	(United States) Austin Versteeg	(United States) Austin Versteeg	2016 SportsCar Grand Prix
4	R1	(Canada) Circuit Trois-Rivières	14 August	(United States) Austin Versteeg	(United States) Michael Whelden	(United States) Clark Toppe	2016 Grand Prix de Trois-Rivières
4	R2	(Canada) Circuit Trois-Rivières	14 August	(United States) Austin Versteeg	(United States) Austin Versteeg	(United States) Clark Toppe	2016 Grand Prix de Trois-Rivières
5	R1	(United States) Mazda Raceway Laguna Seca	11 September	(United States) Clark Toppe	(United States) Michael Whelden	(United States) Austin Versteeg	2016 Monterey Grand Prix
5	R2	(United States) Mazda Raceway Laguna Seca	11 September	(United States) Austin Versteeg	(United States) Austin Versteeg	(United States) Michael Whelden	2016 Monterey Grand Prix
5	R3	(United States) Mazda Raceway Laguna Seca	13 September	(United States) Austin Versteeg	(United States) Austin Versteeg	(United States) Austin Versteeg	2016 Monterey Grand Prix
6	R1	(United States) Road Atlanta	29 September	(United States) Austin Versteeg	(United States) Austin Versteeg	(United States) Austin Versteeg	2016 Petit Le Mans
6	R2	(United States) Road Atlanta	30 September	(United States) Austin Versteeg	(United States) Austin Versteeg	(United States) Austin Versteeg	2016 Petit Le Mans

== Final standings ==
Pos	Driver	SEB		WAT			MOS		TRO		LAG			ATL		Points
L1 class
1	(United States) Clark Toppe	1	2	2	2	DNS	1	2	1	1	4	2	2	2	2	238
2	(United States) Austin Versteeg	3	1	1	1	1	2	1	6	6	1	13	1	1	1	237
3	(United States) Micheal Whelden	4	3	6	5	3	4	5	8	5	2	1	3	3	11	189
4	(United States) Maxwell Hanratty	8	5	3	4	2	5	3	3	2	DNS	14	4	12	3	166
5	(United States) Kyle Masson	5	6	4	3	17	3	16	2	3	3	3	15	13	12	143
6	(Canada) James Dayson	12	8	10	19	15	6	9	5	4	5	4	12	11	4	111
7	(United States) Joel Janco	21	15	14	11	11	7	6	9	8	9	8	9	5	7	90
8	(United States) Gerhard Watzinger	9	9	11	10	7	10	11			10	11	13	6	6	79
9	(United States) Gary Gibson	20	14	DNS	DNS	12	11	7	7	9	6	12	11	4	14	71
10	(United States) Brian Alder	11	17	13	14	8	9	8			7	7	8			59
11	(Canada) Michal Chlumecky			7	7	5	16	18			DSQ	6	7	DNS	DNS	50
12	(United States) Naj Husain	10	12	18	9	16					12	16	6	7	13	43
13	(United States) Jon Brownson	13	10	15	16	9	8	17			15	9	10	DNS	DNS	39
14	(United States) Dave House	15	18	17	13	18	13	10	DNS	DNS	11	10	16	9	8	39
15	(Mexico) Andres Gutierrez			5	6	4										36
16	(Mexico) Patricio O'Ward	2	2													32
17	(United States) Andrew Evans										8	5	5			32
18	(United Kingdom) Stuart Rettie					13	12	12						8	5	31
19	(United States) Don Yount			9	8	6										25
20	(United States) Todd Slusher	14	7	8	12	14										25
21	(Russia) Mikhail Goikhberg								4	7						23
22	(United States) Gerry Kraut	7	20	12	17	10					14	DNS	DNS			21
23	(United States) Andrew Hobbs	6	11													15
24	(Canada) Nathan Blok						18	4								14
25	(United States) Jay Salmon						15	14						15	9	14
26	(United States) Chip Romer													10	10	12
27	(Canada) Guy Laporte	19	13				17	15								11
28	(United States) Tim George Jr.			19	15	DNS					13	15	14	DNS	DNS	7
29	(Brazil) Pedro Cardoso	18	DNS													0
L2 class
	(United States) Max DeAngelis	16	19				14	13						14	DNS	
	(United States) Jay Salmon			20	DNS	DNS										
