= 2017 IMSA Prototype Challenge =

The 2017 IMSA Prototype Challenge presented by Mazda is the twelfth season of the IMSA Lites series. The season features seven double header weekends.

== Regulations ==
For the 2017 season the series had a make-over. The series name was changed from IMSA Lites to the IMSA Prototype Challenge. The classes were also changed. The L2 class was dropped after eleven seasons of service. The series was divided over two classes, LMP3 and MPC. The LMP3 class open to all LMP3 specification cars. Various chassis manufacturers have built LMP3 specification chassis. All chassis are equipped with a Nissan VK50VE, 5,0L, V8 engine. The MPC class is filled by Élan DP02, the former L1 class. All cars are shod with Continental tires.

== Entry list ==
=== LMP3 ===
Team	Chassis	No.	Drivers	Rounds
ANSA Motorsports	Ligier JS P3	4	(United States) Matt Dicken	All
ANSA Motorsports	Ligier JS P3	20	(France) Nico Jamin	1
ASC Motorsports	Ligier JS P3	2	(United States) Michael Watt	4, 7
Ave Motorsports	Ave-Riley AR-2	44	(United States) Paul Fix (M)	1–5
Ave Motorsports	Ave-Riley AR-2	44	(United States) Tony Ave	7
CWR	Ligier JS P3	75	(Canada) James Dayson	3
Extreme Speed Motorsports	Ligier JS P3	3	(United States) Naj Husain (M)	All
Extreme Speed Motorsports	Ligier JS P3	33	(United States) Lance Wilsey	7
Forty 7 Motorsports	Norma M30	47	(United States) Garrett Kletjian	5-6
HP-Tech	Ligier JS P3	87	(United States) Doug Peterson (M)	1
HP-Tech	Ligier JS P3	87	(Venezuela) Roberto La Rocca	2
JDC MotorSports	Ligier JS P3	25	(United States) Joel Janco (M)	1–2
JDC MotorSports	Ligier JS P3	55	(United States) Gerry Kraut (M)	1
K2R Motorsports	Ligier JS P3	51	(Canada) Rob Hodes (M)	1–2
Kelly-Moss Road and Race	Norma M30	14	(United States) Colin Thompson	All
Performance Tech Motorsports	Ligier JS P3	12	(Mexico) Andrés Gutiérrez	1–3
Performance Tech Motorsports	Ginetta-Juno P3-15	23	(United States) Alan Wilzig (M)	1
P1 Motorsports	Ligier JS P3	8	(United States) Kenton Koch	2-7
P1 Motorsports	Ligier JS P3	17	(United Kingdom) Lonnie Pechnik (M)	1–2
P1 Motorsports	Ligier JS P3	17	(United States) Robby Foley	3, 5, 7
P1 Motorsports	Ligier JS P3	17	(Canada) Stefan Rzadzinski	6
P1 Motorsports	Ligier JS P3	71	(Colombia) Juan Perez	1–2, 4

Note: A driver with a (M) is participating in the Amateur Masters Category.

=== Mazda Prototype Challenge (MPC) ===
Team	Chassis	No.	Drivers	Rounds
BAR1 Motorsports	Élan DP02	22	(United States) Brian Alder	1–2
BAR1 Motorsports	Élan DP02	22	(United States) Don Yount	3
De Angelis Racing	Élan DP02	78	(Canada) Max DeAngelis	7
Eurosport Racing	Élan DP02	24	(United States) Tim George	3, 7
Eurosport Racing	Élan DP02	31	(Canada) Michal Chlumecky	2-7
Eurosport Racing	Élan DP02	34	(United States) Jon Brownson	1–4
Eurosport Racing	Élan DP02	42	(United States) Jim Garrett	2, 7
JDC MotorSports	Élan DP02	7	(United States) Kris Wright	All
JDC MotorSports	Élan DP02	25	(United States) Joel Janco	3-4
JDC MotorSports	Élan DP02	72	(United States) Tazio Ottis	All
ODU Engineering	Élan DP02	21	(United Kingdom) Stuart Rettie	All
ODU Engineering	Élan DP02	46	(United States) Jay Salmon	2–3, 6-7
ONE Motorsports	Élan DP02	32	(United States) Paul La Haye	1, 3, 7
ONE Motorsports	Élan DP02	32	(United States) Gerhard Watzinger	7
ONE Motorsports	Élan DP02	86	(United States) Dave House	1, 7
Performance Tech Motorsports	Élan DP02	11	(United States) Robert Masson	All
Performance Tech Motorsports	Élan DP02	18	(United States) Kyle Masson	All
Performance Tech Motorsports	Élan DP02	38	(United States) Stephen Dawes	All
Performance Tech Motorsports	Élan DP02	77	(United States) Howard Jacobs	All
Team Perfect Pedal	Élan DP02	13	(United States) Gary Gibson	All
Wolf Motorsports	Élan DP02	28	(United States) Bart Wolf	7

Note: All Élan DP02s are running with the Mazda MZR 2.0 L Engine.

== Race calendar and results ==
Bold indicates overall winner.

Round		Circuit	Date	Pole position	Fastest lap	LMP3 winner	MPC winner	Supporting
1	R1	(United States) Sebring International Raceway	16 March	(France) Nico Jamin	(France) Nico Jamin	**(France) Nico Jamin**	(United States) Kyle Masson	12 Hours of Sebring
1	R2	(United States) Sebring International Raceway	17 March	(France) Nico Jamin	(France) Nico Jamin	**(France) Nico Jamin**	(United States) Kyle Masson	12 Hours of Sebring
2	R1	(United States) Barber Motorsports Park	21 April	(United States) Kenton Koch	(United States) Kenton Koch	**(United States) Kenton Koch**	(United States) Kyle Masson	Honda Indy Grand Prix of Alabama
2	R2	(United States) Barber Motorsports Park	22 April	(United States) Colin Thompson	(United States) Colin Thompson	**(Mexico) Andrés Gutiérrez**	(United States) Kyle Masson	Honda Indy Grand Prix of Alabama
3	R1	(United States) Watkins Glen International	1 July	(United States) Colin Thompson	(United States) Colin Thompson	**(United States) Colin Thompson**	(United States) Kris Wright	6 Hours of the Glen
3	R2	(United States) Watkins Glen International	2 July	(United States) Colin Thompson	(United States) Colin Thompson	**(Mexico) Andrés Gutiérrez**	(United States) Kyle Masson	6 Hours of the Glen
4	R1	(Canada) Canadian Tire Motorsport Park	8 July	(United States) Kenton Koch	(United States) Kenton Koch	**(United States) Kenton Koch**	(United States) Kyle Masson	SportsCar Grand Prix
4	R2	(Canada) Canadian Tire Motorsport Park	9 July	(United States) Kenton Koch	(United States) Kenton Koch	**(United States) Kenton Koch**	(United States) Kyle Masson	SportsCar Grand Prix
5	R1	(United States) Lime Rock Park	22 July	(United States) Colin Thompson	(United States) Colin Thompson	**(United States) Colin Thompson**	(United States) Kyle Masson	Northeast Grand Prix
6	R1	(Canada) Circuit Trois-Rivières	12 August	(United States) Kyle Masson	(United States) Naj Husain	(United States) **Kenton Koch**	(United States) Gary Gibson	Grand Prix de Trois-Rivières
6	R2	(Canada) Circuit Trois-Rivières	13 August	(United States) Kyle Masson	(United States) Kenton Koch	(United States) **Kenton Koch**	(United States) Kyle Masson	Grand Prix de Trois-Rivières
7	R1	(United States) Road Atlanta	6 October	(United States) Kenton Koch	(United States) Kenton Koch	(United States) **Kenton Koch**	(United States) Kyle Masson	Petit Le Mans
7	R2	(United States) Road Atlanta	7 October	(United States) Kenton Koch	(United States) Colin Thompson	(United States) **Kenton Koch**	(United States) Kyle Masson	Petit Le Mans

== Final standings ==
=== LMP3 ===
Color	Result
Gold	Winner
Silver	2nd place
Bronze	3rd place
Green	4th & 5th place
Light Blue	6th–10th place
Dark Blue	11th place or lower
Purple	Did not finish
Red	Did not qualify (DNQ)
Brown	Withdrawn (Wth)
Black	Disqualified (DSQ)
White	Did not start (DNS)
Blank	Did not participate (DNP)
Blank	Driver replacement (Rpl)
Blank	Injured (Inj)
Blank	No race held (NH)

Pos.	Driver	SEB 1	SEB 2	BAR 1	BAR 2	WGL 1	WGL 2	MOS 1	MOS 2	LRP	TRO 1	TRO 2	ATL 1	ATL 2	Points
1	(United States) Colin Thompson	11	2	4	3	1	6	2	2	1	3	2	3	3	217
2	(United States) Kenton Koch			1	2	2	7	1	1	2	1	1	1	1	209
3	(United States) Naj Husain	4	5	6	6	8	4	3	3	7	4	4	5	5	162
4	(United States) Matt Dicken	9	9	11	7	6	5	5	5	6	5	5	6	8	126
5	(Mexico) Andrés Gutiérrez	2	3	2	1	3	1								108
6	(United States) Paul Fix	8	10	10	10	7	6	6	4	5					81
7	(United States) Robby Foley					4	8			3			2	4	70
8	(United Kingdom) Lonnie Pechnik	3	4	5	5										54
9	(France) Nico Jamin	1	1												42
10	(United States) Michael Watt							4	6				8	6	42
11	(Colombia) JC Perez	7	8	7	9			7	DNS						42
12	(United States) Garrett Kletjian									4	6	6			34
13	(United States) Tony Ave												4	2	32
14	(Canada) Stefan Rzadzinski										3	3			32
15	(United States) Rob Hodes	6	11	8	8										31
16	(Canada) James Dayson					5	2								30
17	(Venezuela) Roberto La Rocca			3	4										30
18	(United States) Doug Peterson	5	6												22
19	(United States) Lance Willsey												7	7	18
20	(United States) Gerry Kraut	12	7												13
21	(United States) Joel Janco	13	13												13
22	(United States) Alan Wilzig	10	12												10

=== Mazda Prototype Challenge ===
Pos.	Driver	SEB 1	SEB 2	BAR 1	BAR 2	WGL 1	WGL 2	MOS 1	MOS 2	LRP	TRO 1	TRO 2	ATL 1	ATL 2	Points
1	(United States) Kyle Masson	1	1	1	1	3	1	1	1	1	6	1	1	1	259
2	(United States) Kris Wright	2	12	7	8	1	3	10	10	2	2	2	2	2	177
3	(United States) Tazio Ottis	12	3	3	2	2	5	11	5	3	9	3	3	4	170
4	(United Kingdom) Stuart Rettie	6	11	4	5	8	4	5	9	4	3	4	5	3	154
5	(United States) Robert Masson	7	7	6	6	5	7	4	6	5	8	5	4	6	139
6	(United States) Gary Gibson	3	4	5	13	6	6	8	4	8	1	8	16	12	127
7	(United States) Stephen Dawes	9	9	12	10	12	9	7	11	7	5	6	9	9	94
8	(Canada) Michal Chlumecky			2	3	14	2	2	7				14	10	89
9	(United States) Jon Brownson	5	5	8	7	7	13	3	2						87
10	(United States) Howard Jacobs	10	10	11	12	13	10	6	8	6	7	7	11	11	86
11	(United States) Brian Alder	4	2	13	4										49
12	(United States) Paul Lahaye	8	6			9	8						13	7	45
13	(United States) Joel Janco					10	11	9	3						34
14	(United States) Dave House	11	8										7	5	34
15	(United States) Jay Salmon			9	11	15	15				4	DNS	15	15	30
16	(United States) Jim Garrett			10	9								8	14	23
17	(United States) Don Yount					4	14								16
18	(Canada) Max DeAngelis												12	8	12
19	(United States) Tim George					11	12						DNS	13	12
20	(United States) Gerhard Watzinger												6	17	10
21	(United States) Bart Wolf												10	16	6
