= 2018 Johnsonville 180 =

23rd race of the 2018 NASCAR Xfinity Series

Race details
- Race 23 of 33 in the 2018 NASCAR Xfinity Series season
- Date: August 25, 2018
- Location: Road America in Elkhart Lake, Wisconsin
- Course: Permanent racing facility
- Course length: 4.048 miles (6.515 km)
- Distance: 45 laps, 182 mi (293 km)
- Average speed: 75.926 miles per hour (122.191 km/h)

Pole position
Driver	Matt Tifft	Richard Childress Racing
- Time: 133.320

Most laps led
Driver	Justin Allgaier	JR Motorsports
- Laps: 14

Winner
No. 7	Justin Allgaier	JR Motorsports

Television in the United States
- Network: NBCSN

Radio in the United States
- Radio: PRN

The 2018 Johnsonville 180 was a NASCAR Xfinity Series race held on August 25, 2018, at Road America in Elkhart Lake, Wisconsin. Contested over 45 laps on the 4.048-mile (6.515 km) road course, it was the 23rd race of the 2018 NASCAR Xfinity Series season.

== Entry list ==
No.	Driver	Team	Manufacturer
0	Garrett Smithley	JD Motorsports	Chevrolet
00	Cole Custer	Stewart-Haas Racing with Biagi-DenBeste Racing	Ford
01	Vinnie Miller (R)	JD Motorsports	Chevrolet
1	Elliott Sadler	JR Motorsports	Chevrolet
2	Matt Tifft	Richard Childress Racing	Chevrolet
3	Brendan Gaughan	Richard Childress Racing	Chevrolet
4	Ross Chastain	JD Motorsports	Chevrolet
5	Michael Annett	JR Motorsports	Chevrolet
6	Conor Daly	Roush Fenway Racing	Ford
7	Justin Allgaier	JR Motorsports	Chevrolet
8	Scott Heckert	B. J. McLeod Motorsports	Chevrolet
9	Tyler Reddick (R)	JR Motorsports	Chevrolet
11	Ryan Truex	Kaulig Racing	Chevrolet
13	Timmy Hill	MBM Motorsports	Dodge
15	Katherine Legge	JD Motorsports	Chevrolet
16	Ryan Reed	Roush Fenway Racing	Ford
18	James Davison	Joe Gibbs Racing	Toyota
19	Brandon Jones	Joe Gibbs Racing	Toyota
20	Christopher Bell (R)	Joe Gibbs Racing	Toyota
21	Daniel Hemric	Richard Childress Racing	Chevrolet
22	Austin Cindric (R)	Team Penske	Ford
23	Bill Elliott	GMS Racing	Chevrolet
35	Joey Gase	Go Green Racing	Chevrolet
36	Alex Labbé (R)	DGM Racing	Chevrolet
38	Brian Henderson	RSS Racing	Chevrolet
39	Ryan Sieg	RSS Racing	Chevrolet
40	Chad Finchum (R)	MBM Motorsports	Toyota
42	Justin Marks	Chip Ganassi Racing	Chevrolet
45	Josh Bilicki (R)	JP Motorsports	Toyota
51	Jeremy Clements	Jeremy Clements Racing	Chevrolet
52	David Starr	Jimmy Means Racing	Chevrolet
55	James French	JP Motorsports	Toyota
60	Ty Majeski	Roush Fenway Racing	Ford
61	Kaz Grala (R)	Fury Race Cars	Ford
66	Carl Long	MBM Motorsports	Dodge
74	Stephen Leicht	Mike Harmon Racing	Dodge
76	Spencer Boyd (R)	SS-Green Light Racing	Chevrolet
78	Ryan Ellis	B. J. McLeod Motorsports	Chevrolet
90	Andy Lally	DGM Racing	Chevrolet
93	Jeff Green	RSS Racing	Chevrolet

== Practice ==
=== First practice ===
Tyler Reddick led first practice with a fastest lap of 158.280 seconds and a speed of 92.070 mph (148.172 km/h). Conor Daly was the only other driver to go out, but he did not complete a full timed lap. Most drivers did not participate due to persistent light rain throughout first practice.

Pos	No.	Driver	Team	Manufacturer	Time	Speed
1	9	Tyler Reddick	JR Motorsports	Chevrolet	2:38.280	92.070
2	6	Conor Daly	Roush Fenway Racing	Ford	00:00.000	00.000

=== Final practice ===
Justin Marks was the fastest in the practice session with a time of 132.960 seconds and a speed of 109.603 mph (176.389 km/h).

Pos	No.	Driver	Team	Manufacturer	Time	Speed
1	42	Justin Marks	Chip Ganassi Racing	Chevrolet	2:12.960	109.603
2	18	James Davison	Joe Gibbs Racing	Toyota	2:13.477	109.178
3	22	Austin Cindric (R)	Team Penske	Ford	2:13.515	109.147

== Qualifying ==
Matt Tifft scored the pole for the race with a time of 133.320 and a speed of 109.307 mph (175.913 km/h).

=== Qualifying results ===
Pos	No.	Driver	Team	Manufacturer	Best Speed
1	2	Matt Tifft	Richard Childress Racing	Chevrolet	109.307
2	00	Cole Custer	Stewart-Haas Racing with Biagi-DenBeste Racing	Ford	109.294
3	18	James Davison	Joe Gibbs Racing	Toyota	109.262
4	42	Justin Marks	Chip Ganassi Racing	Chevrolet	109.093
5	20	Christopher Bell (R)	Joe Gibbs Racing	Toyota	108.973
6	3	Brendan Gaughan	Richard Childress Racing	Chevrolet	108.838
7	11	Ryan Truex	Kaulig Racing	Chevrolet	108.340
8	22	Austin Cindric (R)	Team Penske	Ford	108.247
9	19	Brandon Jones	Joe Gibbs Racing	Toyota	108.055
10	16	Ryan Reed	Roush Fenway Racing	Ford	107.402
11	7	Justin Allgaier	JR Motorsports	Chevrolet	106.590
12	21	Daniel Hemric	Richard Childress Racing	Chevrolet	108.502
13	90	Andy Lally	DGM Racing	Chevrolet	108.374
14	51	Jeremy Clements	Jeremy Clements Racing	Chevrolet	108.251
15	6	Conor Daly	Roush Fenway Racing	Ford	108.202
16	4	Ross Chastain	JD Motorsports	Chevrolet	108.157
17	1	Elliott Sadler	JR Motorsports	Chevrolet	107.907
18	61	Kaz Grala (R)	Fury Race Cars	Ford	107.822
19	5	Michael Annett	JR Motorsports	Chevrolet	107.352
20	39	Ryan Sieg	RSS Racing	Chevrolet	107.225
21	60	Ty Majeski	Roush Fenway Racing	Ford	107.181
22	38	Brian Henderson	RSS Racing	Chevrolet	107.119
23	23	Bill Elliott	GMS Racing	Chevrolet	107.044
24	8	Scott Heckert	B. J. McLeod Motorsports	Chevrolet	107.014
25	45	Josh Bilicki (R)	JP Motorsports	Toyota	106.821
26	15	Katherine Legge	JD Motorsports	Chevrolet	106.730
27	36	Alex Labbé (R)	DGM Racing	Chevrolet	106.516
28	78	Ryan Ellis	B. J. McLeod Motorsports	Chevrolet	106.091
29	9	Tyler Reddick (R)	JR Motorsports	Chevrolet	105.949
30	35	Joey Gase	Go Green Racing	Chevrolet	105.614
31	0	Garrett Smithley	JD Motorsports	Chevrolet	105.517
32	52	David Starr	Jimmy Means Racing	Chevrolet	104.828
33	13	Timmy Hill	MBM Motorsports	Dodge	104.790
34	55	James French	JP Motorsports	Toyota	104.459
35	93	Jeff Green	RSS Racing	Chevrolet	103.563
36	40	Chad Finchum (R)	MBM Motorsports	Toyota	102.401
37	76	Spencer Boyd (R)	SS-Green Light Racing	Chevrolet	101.754
38	01	Vinnie Miller (R)	JD Motorsports	Chevrolet	99.421
39	74	Stephen Leicht	Mike Harmon Racing	Dodge	98.990
40	66	Carl Long	MBM Motorsports	Dodge	98.868

== Race ==
=== Stage Results ===
Stage 1

Pos	No	Driver	Team	Manufacturer	Points
1	2	Matt Tifft	Richard Childress Racing	Chevrolet	10
2	20	Christopher Bell (R)	Joe Gibbs Racing	Toyota	9
3	3	Brendan Gaughan	Richard Childress Racing	Chevrolet	8
4	42	Justin Marks	Chip Ganassi Racing	Chevrolet	7
5	51	Jeremy Clements	Jeremy Clements Racing	Chevrolet	6
6	11	Ryan Truex	Kaulig Racing	Chevrolet	5
7	00	Cole Custer	Stewart-Haas Racing with Biagi-DenBeste Racing	Ford	4
8	90	Andy Lally	DGM Racing	Chevrolet	3
9	7	Justin Allgaier	JR Motorsports	Chevrolet	2
10	4	Ross Chastain	JD Motorsports	Chevrolet	1

Stage 2

Pos	No	Driver	Team	Manufacturer	Points
1	21	Daniel Hemric	Richard Childress Racing	Chevrolet	10
2	2	Matt Tifft	Richard Childress Racing	Chevrolet	9
3	1	Elliott Sadler	JR Motorsports	Chevrolet	8
4	20	Christopher Bell (R)	Joe Gibbs Racing	Toyota	7
5	7	Justin Allgaier	JR Motorsports	Chevrolet	6
6	42	Justin Marks	Chip Ganassi Racing	Chevrolet	5
7	00	Cole Custer	Stewart-Haas Racing with Biagi-DenBeste Racing	Ford	4
8	11	Ryan Truex	Kaulig Racing	Chevrolet	3
9	90	Andy Lally	DGM Racing	Chevrolet	2
10	4	Ross Chastain	JD Motorsports	Chevrolet	1

=== Final Stage Results ===
Stage 3

Pos	Grid	No	Driver	Team	Manufacturer	Laps	Points
1	11	7	Justin Allgaier	JR Motorsports	Chevrolet	45	48
2	1	2	Matt Tifft	Richard Childress Racing	Chevrolet	45	54
3	12	21	Daniel Hemric	Richard Childress Racing	Chevrolet	45	44
4	2	00	Cole Custer	Stewart-Haas Racing with Biagi-DenBeste Racing	Ford	45	41
5	17	1	Elliott Sadler	JR Motorsports	Chevrolet	45	40
6	4	42	Justin Marks	Chip Ganassi Racing	Chevrolet	45	43
7	16	4	Ross Chastain	JD Motorsports	Chevrolet	45	32
8	3	18	James Davison	Joe Gibbs Racing	Toyota	45	29
9	9	19	Brandon Jones	Joe Gibbs Racing	Toyota	45	28
10	13	90	Andy Lally	DGM Racing	Chevrolet	45	32
11	18	61	Kaz Grala (R)	Fury Race Cars	Ford	45	26
12	19	5	Michael Annett	JR Motorsports	Chevrolet	45	25
13	14	51	Jeremy Clements	Jeremy Clements Racing	Chevrolet	45	30
14	26	15	Katherine Legge	JD Motorsports	Chevrolet	45	23
15	31	0	Garrett Smithley	JD Motorsports	Chevrolet	45	22
16	27	36	Alex Labbé (R)	DGM Racing	Chevrolet	45	21
17	28	78	Ryan Ellis	B. J. McLeod Motorsports	Chevrolet	45	20
18	22	38	Brian Henderson	RSS Racing	Chevrolet	45	19
19	30	35	Joey Gase	Go Green Racing	Chevrolet	45	18
20	23	23	Bill Elliott	GMS Racing	Chevrolet	45	17
21	37	76	Spencer Boyd (R)	SS-Green Light Racing	Chevrolet	45	16
22	36	40	Chad Finchum (R)	MBM Motorsports	Toyota	45	15
23	5	20	Christopher Bell (R)	Joe Gibbs Racing	Toyota	45	30
24	6	3	Brendan Gaughan	Richard Childress Racing	Chevrolet	45	21
25	7	11	Ryan Truex	Kaulig Racing	Chevrolet	45	20
26	20	39	Ryan Sieg	RSS Racing	Chevrolet	45	11
27	38	01	Vinnie Miller (R)	JD Motorsports	Chevrolet	45	10
28	21	60	Ty Majeski	Roush Fenway Racing	Ford	45	9
29	24	8	Scott Heckert	B. J. McLeod Motorsports	Chevrolet	44	8
30	25	45	Josh Bilicki (R)	JP Motorsports	Toyota	35	7
31	15	6	Conor Daly	Roush Fenway Racing	Ford	35	6
32	40	66	Carl Long	MBM Motorsports	Dodge	32	5
33	39	74	Stephen Leicht	Mike Harmon Racing	Dodge	25	4
34	29	9	Tyler Reddick (R)	JR Motorsports	Chevrolet	25	3
35	33	13	Timmy Hill	MBM Motorsports	Dodge	24	2
36	32	52	David Starr	Jimmy Means Racing	Chevrolet	17	1
37	8	22	Austin Cindric (R)	Team Penske	Ford	15	1
38	34	55	James French	JP Motorsports	Toyota	8	1
39	10	16	Ryan Reed	Roush Fenway Racing	Ford	6	1
40	35	93	Jeff Green	RSS Racing	Chevrolet	2	1

Previous race: 2018 Food City 300	NASCAR Xfinity Series; 2018 season	Next race: 2018 Sport Clips Haircuts VFW 200
