= 2019 Mobil 1 SportsCar Grand Prix =

Seventh round of the 2019 IMSA SportsCar Championship season

Track map of Canadian Tire Motorsport Park

The 2019 Mobil 1 SportsCar Grand Prix was a sports car race sanctioned by the International Motor Sports Association (IMSA). The race was held at Canadian Tire Motorsport Park in Bowmanville, Ontario, on July 7, 2019. This race was the seventh round of the 2019 IMSA SportsCar Championship, and the third round of the 2019 WeatherTech Sprint Cup.

After a temporary red flag due to an incident involving the No. 50 Juncos Racing Cadillac, the race was won by the No. 77 team of Oliver Jarvis and Tristan Nunez. PR1/ Mathiasen Motorsports secured their third consecutive victory in LMP2, while Earl Bamber and Laurens Vanthoor topped the GTLM class. In GTD, Turner Motorsport scored their first victory of the season.

== Background ==
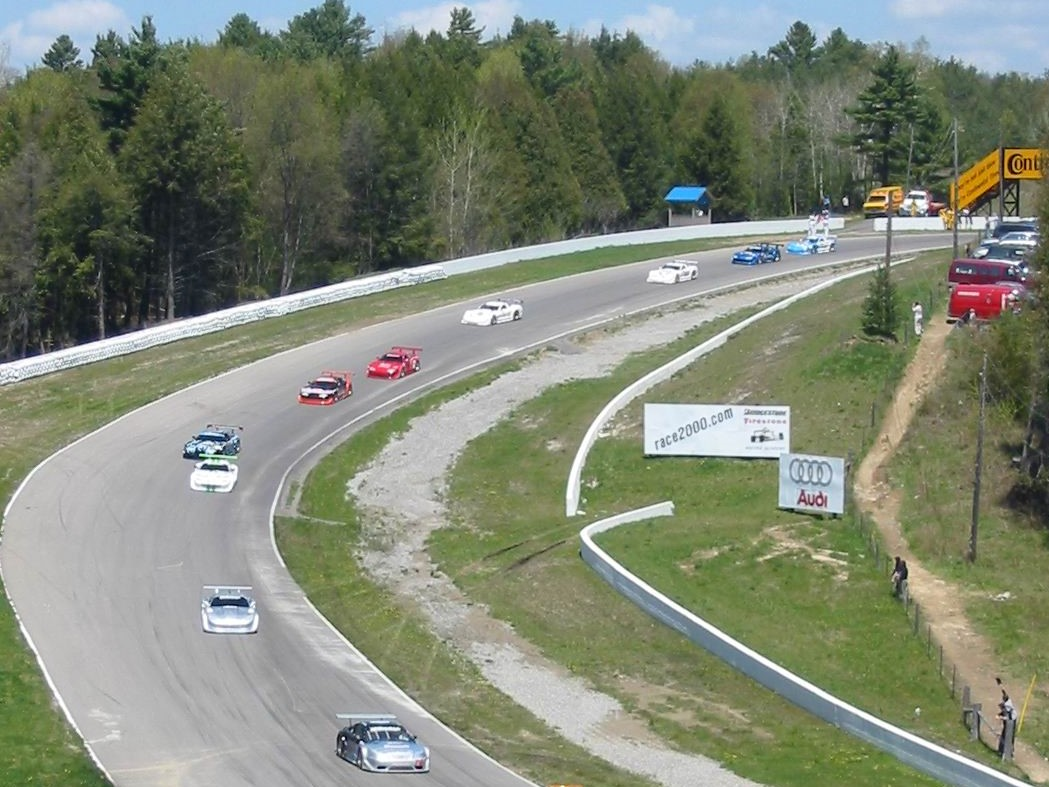
Canadian Tire Motorsports Park, where the race was held.

International Motor Sports Association's (IMSA) president Scott Atherton confirmed the race was part of the schedule for the 2019 IMSA SportsCar Championship (IMSA SCC) in August 2018. It was the sixth consecutive year the event was held as part of the WeatherTech SportsCar Championship. The 2019 Mobil 1 SportsCar Grand Prix was the seventh of twelve sports car races of 2019 by IMSA, and it was the third of seven rounds held as part of the WeatherTech Sprint Cup. The race was held at the ten-turn 2.459 mi (3.957 km) Canadian Tire Motorsports Park in Bowmanville, Ontario, Canada on July 7, 2019.

On July 3, 2019, IMSA released their latest technical bulletin announcing BoP for the event. Restrictions were left unchanged for the two prototype classes from the previous round at Watkins Glen International, while minor changes were made within the two GT classes. The lone modification in GTLM was a 10 kilogram weight increase for the Corvette, while victory at Watkins Glen led to a 20 kilogram weight increase for the Acura NSX. The only other change was a four liter fuel capacity increase for the Lexus RC F.

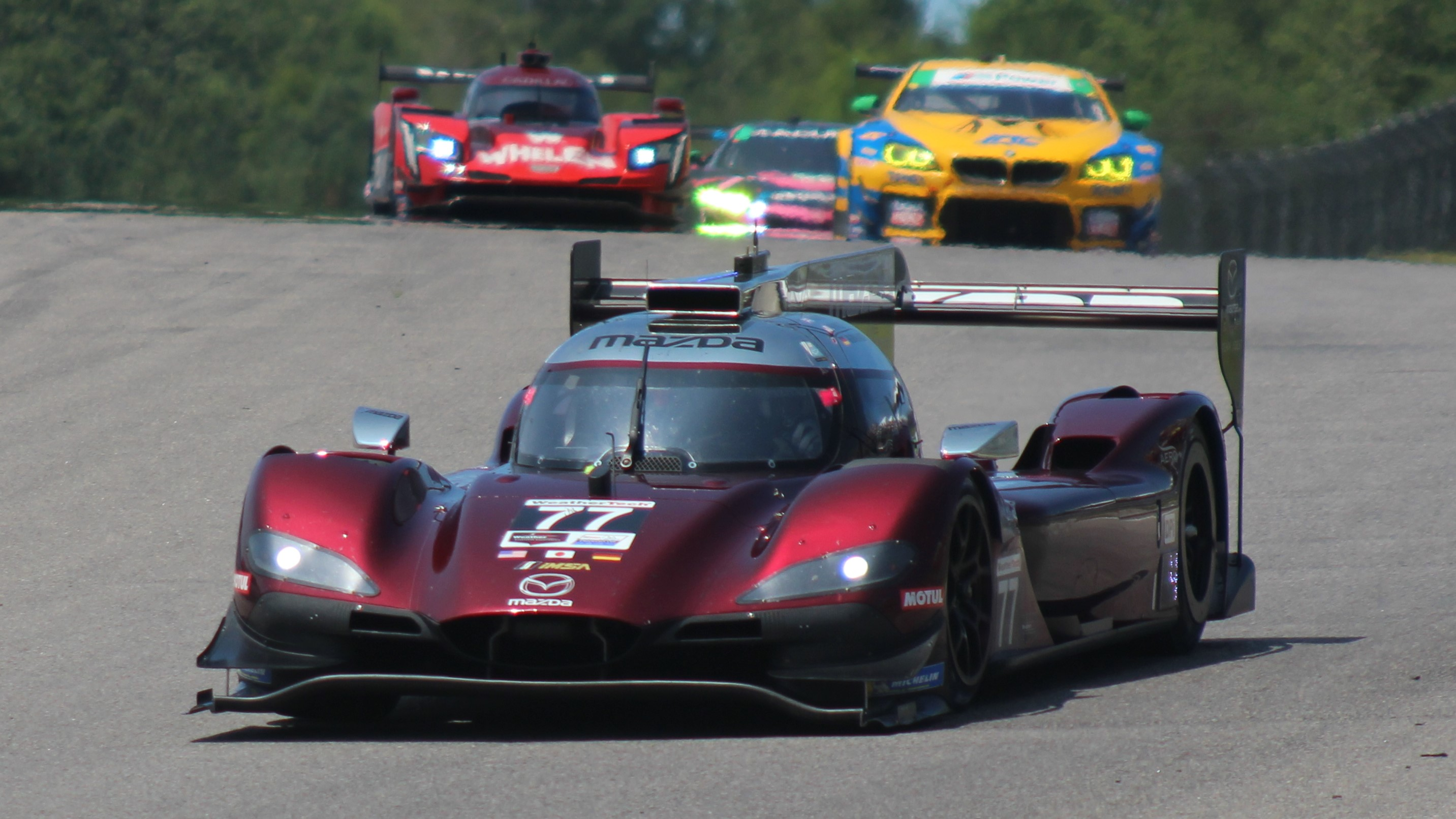
Mazda Team Joest Mazda RT24-P - Winner 2019 SportsCar Grand Prix

Colin Braun and Jon Bennett entered the race as defending winners.

Before, Dane Cameron and Juan Pablo Montoya led the DPi Drivers' Championship with 177 points, 1 point ahead of Pipo Derani and Felipe Nasr. In LMP2, Cameron Cassels and Kyle Masson led the Drivers' Championship with 131 points, ahead of Matt McMurry. The GTLM Drivers' Championship was led by Patrick Pilet and Nick Tandy with 151 points; the duo held a one-point advantage over Earl Bamber and Laurens Vanthoor in second followed by Antonio García and Jan Magnussen in third with 151 points. With 119 points, Mario Farnbacher and Trent Hindman led the GTD Drivers' Championship, 16 points ahead of Richard Heistand and Jack Hawksworth. Acura, Porsche, and Lamborghini were leading their respective Manufacturers' Championships, while Acura Team Penske, Performance Tech Motorsports, Porsche GT Team, and Meyer Shank Racing each led their own Teams' Championships.

=== Entries ===
A total of 34 cars took part in the event, split across four classes. 11 were entered in DPi, 2 in LMP2, 8 in GTLM, and 13 in GTD. In DPi, Victor Franzoni replaced René Binder in Juncos Racing's sprint race lineup, with no other changes to the class. A similar change was noted in LMP2, as Dalton Kellett replaced Gabriel Aubry for PR1 Mathiasen Motorsports. In GTLM, Tommy Milner was sidelined after suffering a hand injury at Watkins Glen, necessitating Marcel Fässler to step into the No. 4 Corvette. GTD featured wholescale changes, with two cars dropping out after the preliminary entry list had been released. The Audis of Moorespeed and Starworks Motorsport withdrew, with the former having suffered a shunt at Watkins Glen and the latter citing performance issues as the cause for withdrawal. Bia Figueiredo also replaced Christina Nielsen in the Meyer Shank Racing No. 57 entry.

== Practice ==
There were three practice sessions preceding the start of the race on Saturday, two on Friday and one on Saturday. The first session on Friday morning lasted 75 minutes while the second session on Friday afternoon lasted one hour. The third on Saturday morning lasted one hour.

=== Practice 1 ===
The first practice session took place at 11:20 am ET on Friday and ended with Colin Braun topping the charts for CORE Autosport, with a lap time of 1:05.876. Harry Tincknell was second fastest in the No. 55 Mazda followed by Hélio Castroneves in the No. 7 Acura Team Penske entry. Kyle Masson set the fastest time in LMP2. The GTLM class was topped by the No. 912 Porsche GT Team Porsche 911 RSR of Earl Bamber with a time of 1:14.560. Nick Tandy was second fastest in the sister No. 911 Porsche GT Team entry followed by Connor De Phillippi in the No. 25 BMW. The GTD class was topped by the No. 33 Mercedes-AMG Team Riley Motorsports Mercedes-AMG GT3 of Jeroen Bleekemolen with a time of 1:16.885. Andy Lally was second fastest in the No. 44 Magnus Racing Lamborghini followed by Frankie Montecalvo's No. 12 Lexus in third position.

Pos.	Class	No.	Team	Driver	Time	Gap
1	DPi	54	CORE Autosport	Colin Braun	1:05.876	_
2	DPi	55	Mazda Team Joest	Harry Tincknell	1:06.295	+0.419
3	DPi	7	Acura Team Penske	Hélio Castroneves	1:06.341	+0.465

=== Practice 2 ===
The second practice session took place at 4:10 PM ET on Friday and ended with Colin Braun topping the charts for CORE Autosport, with a lap time of 1:05.875. Dane Cameron was second fastest in the No. 6 Acura Team Penske entry followed by Ricky Taylor in the sister No. 7 Acura. Matt McMurry set the fastest in LMP2. The GTLM class was topped by the No. 3 Corvette Racing Chevrolet Corvette C7.R of Jan Magnussen with a time of 1:14.218. Marcel Fässler was second fastest in the sister No. 4 Corvette Racing entry followed by Richard Westbrook's No. 67 Ford GT in third position. The GTD class was topped by the No. 96 Turner Motorsport BMW M6 GT3 of Bill Auberlen with a time of 1:16.859. Andy Lally was second fastest in the No. 44 Magnus Racing Lamborghini followed by Richard Heistand in the No. 14 Lexus. The session ended early due to the circuits asphalt breaking up at turns two and five.

Pos.	Class	No.	Team	Driver	Time	Gap
1	DPi	54	CORE Autosport	Colin Braun	1:05.875	_
2	DPi	6	Acura Team Penske	Dane Cameron	1:05.899	+0.024
3	DPi	7	Acura Team Penske	Ricky Taylor	1:06.047	+0.172

=== Practice 3 ===
The third and final practice session took place at 8:00 am ET Saturday and ended with Hélio Castroneves topping the charts for Acura Team Penske, with a lap time of 1:05.632. Colin Braun was second fastest in the No. 54 CORE Autosport Nissan followed by Jonathan Bomarito in the No. 55 Mazda Team Joest entry. Kyle Masson set the fastest time in LMP2. The GTLM class was topped by the No. 67 Ford Chip Ganassi Racing Ford GT of Ryan Briscoe with a time of 1:13.739. Jesse Krohn was second fastest in the No. 24 BMW followed by Patrick Pilet in the No. 911 Porsche. The GTD class was topped by the No. 96 Turner Motorsport BMW M6 GT3 of Robby Foley with a time of 1:16.229. Ben Keating was second fastest in the No. 33 Mercedes-AMG Team Riley Motorsports Mercedes-AMG followed by Andy Lally in the No. 44 Magnus Racing Lamborghini. The session saw one stoppage when Tristan Vautier in the No. 85 JDC-Miller Motorsports Cadillac and Ryan Hardwick in the No. 48 Paul Miller Racing Lamborghini collided at turn two. Hardwick lost control of the No. 48 Paul Miller Racing Lamborghini Huracán and spun towards the barrier. The car sustained heavy right side damage, but Hardwick was uninjured and exited his car without external aid. After practice, Paul Miller Racing withdrew the No. 48 car because the team did not transport a spare chassis to Canadian Tire Motorsport Park.

Pos.	Class	No.	Team	Driver	Time	Gap
1	DPi	7	Acura Team Penske	Hélio Castroneves	1:05.632	_
2	DPi	54	CORE Autosport	Colin Braun	1:05.784	+0.152
3	DPi	55	Mazda Team Joest	Jonathan Bomarito	1:05.947	+0.315

== Qualifying ==
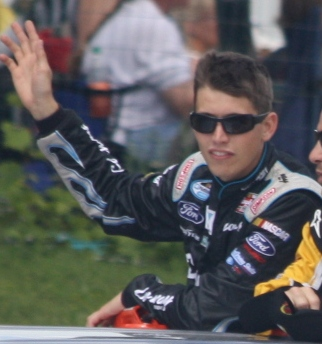
Colin Braun (pictured in 2010) set the fastest overall lap time in qualifying.

Saturday's late morning qualification session into was broken into three groups that lasted 15 minutes each. Cars in GTD were sent out first before those grouped in GTLM and DPi/LMP2 had two separate identically timed sessions. All cars were required to be driven by one participant and the starting order was determined by the competitor's fastest lap. IMSA then arranged the grid so that the DPi, LMP2, and GTLM cars started in front of the GTD field.

The first was for cars in the GTD class. Robby Foley qualified on pole for the class driving the No. 96 car for Turner Motorsport, beating Ben Keating in the No. 33 Mercedes-AMG by less than one-tenth of a second. Following in third was Trent Hindman's No. 86 Acura with the No. 57 Acura of Bia Figueiredo in fourth. Zacharie Robichon completed the top five in the No. 9 Pfaff Motorsports Porsche followed by Frankie Montecalvo's No. 12 Lexus in sixth position.

The second session was for cars in the GTLM class. Jesse Krohn qualified on pole for the class driving the No. 24 car for BMW Team RLL, besting teammate Tom Blomqvist in the sister No. 25 BMW by less than four-tenths of a second. Following in third was Ryan Briscoe's No. 67 Ford GT followed by the No. 911 Porsche of Patrick Pilet. Laurens Vanthoor completed the top five in the No. 912 Porsche followed by Joey Hand's No. 66 Ford GT in sixth. The Corvette Racing entries rounded out the GTLM qualifiers.

The final session of qualifying was for cars in the LMP2 and DPi classes. Colin Braun's No. 54 CORE Autosport Nissan set the overall fastest time. However, the car would be dropped to the rear of the DPi field because the team changed their starting driver. As a result, Hélio Castroneves in the No. 7 Acura was promoted to first and would start the race from pole position. Jonathan Bomarito in the No. 55 Mazda started in second position followed by Juan Pablo Montoya's No. 6 Acura. Tristan Nunez's No. 77 Mazda started in fourth position followed by Felipe Nasr in the No. 31 Whelen Engineering Racing Cadillac in fifth. Kyle Masson qualified on pole in LMP2 driving the No. 38 car for Performance Tech Motorsports, besting Dalton Kellett in the No. 52 PR1/ Mathiasen Motorsports car.

== Qualifying results ==
Pole positions in each class are indicated in bold and by ‡.

Pos.	Class	No.	Team	Driver	Time	Gap	Grid
1	DPi	54	(United States) CORE Autosport	(United States) Colin Braun	1:05.452	_	11^{1}
2	**DPi**	**7**	**(United States) Acura Team Penske**	**(Brazil) Hélio Castroneves**	**1:05.526**	**+0.074**	1‡
3	DPi	55	(Germany) Mazda Team Joest	(United States) Jonathan Bomarito	1:05.780	+0.328	2
4	DPi	6	(United States) Acura Team Penske	(Colombia) Juan Pablo Montoya	1:05.872	+0.420	3
5	DPi	77	(Germany) Mazda Team Joest	(United States) Tristan Nunez	1:05.913	+0.461	4
6	DPi	31	(United States) Whelen Engineering Racing	(Brazil) Felipe Nasr	1:06.080	+0.628	5
7	DPi	5	(United States) Mustang Sampling Racing	(Portugal) Filipe Albuquerque	1:06.130	+0.678	6
8	DPi	10	(United States) Konica Minolta Cadillac	(United States) Jordan Taylor	1:06.250	+0.798	7
9	DPi	84	(United States) JDC-Miller Motorsports	(Switzerland) Simon Trummer	1:06.598	+1.146	8
10	DPi	85	(United States) JDC-Miller Motorsports	(Canada) Misha Goikhberg	1:06.873	+1.421	9
11	DPi	50	(Argentina) Juncos Racing	(United States) Will Owen	1:07.319	+1.867	10
12	**LMP2**	**38**	**(United States) Performance Tech Motorsports**	**(United States) Kyle Masson**	**1:08.211**	**+2.759**	12‡
13	LMP2	52	(United States) PR1/ Mathiasen Motorsports	(Canada) Dalton Kellett	1:08.720	+3.268	13
14	**GTLM**	**24**	**(United States) BMW Team RLL**	**(Finland) Jesse Krohn**	**1:13.086**	**+7.634**	14‡
15	GTLM	25	(United States) BMW Team RLL	(United Kingdom) Tom Blomqvist	1:13.548	+8.096	15
16	GTLM	67	(United States) Ford Chip Ganassi Racing	(Australia) Ryan Briscoe	1:13.804	+8.352	16
17	GTLM	911	(United States) Porsche GT Team	(France) Patrick Pilet	1:13.829	+8.377	17
18	GTLM	912	(United States) Porsche GT Team	(Belgium) Laurens Vanthoor	1:14.050	+8.598	18
19	GTLM	66	(United States) Ford Chip Ganassi Racing	(United States) Joey Hand	1:14.138	+8.686	19
20	GTLM	3	(United States) Corvette Racing	(Denmark) Jan Magnussen	1:14.295	+8.843	20
21	GTLM	4	(United States) Corvette Racing	(Switzerland) Marcel Fässler	1:14.769	+9.317	21
22	**GTD**	**96**	**(United States) Turner Motorsport**	**(United States) Robby Foley**	**1:16.172**	**+10.720**	22‡
23	GTD	33	(United States) Mercedes-AMG Team Riley Motorsports	(United States) Ben Keating	1:16.253	+10.801	23
24	GTD	86	(United States) Meyer Shank Racing with Curb-Agajanian	(United States) Trent Hindman	1:16.353	+10.901	24
25	GTD	57	(United States) Heinricher Racing w/Meyer Shank Racing	(Brazil) Bia Figueiredo	1:16.865	+11.413	25
26	GTD	9	(Canada) Pfaff Motorsports	(Canada) Zacharie Robichon	1:16.959	+11.507	26
27	GTD	12	(Canada) AIM Vasser Sullivan	(United States) Frankie Montecalvo	1:17.009	+11.557	27
28	GTD	73	(United States) Park Place Motorsports	(United States) Patrick Lindsey	1:17.073	+11.621	28
29	GTD	14	(Canada) AIM Vasser Sullivan	(United States) Richard Heistand	1:17.267	+11.815	29
30	GTD	63	(United States) Scuderia Corsa	(United States) Cooper MacNeil	1:17.301	+11.849	30
31	GTD	76	(Canada) Compass Racing	(United States) Matt Plumb	1:17.316	+11.864	31
32	GTD	74	(United States) Lone Star Racing	(United States) Gar Robinson	1:17.368	+11.916	32
33	GTD	44	(United States) Magnus Racing	(United States) John Potter	1:18.110	+12.658	33
—	GTD	48	(United States) Paul Miller Racing	Did Not Participate			—
Sources:

- ^{1} The No. 54 CORE Autosport entry was moved to the back of the DPi field for starting the race with a different driver than who qualified. Additionally, the team elected to change tires after qualifying.

== Race ==
=== Post-race ===
The final results of DPi meant Cameron and Montoya increased their points lead to 3 points over Derani and Nasr while Jarvis and Nunez advanced from seventh to fourth. McMurry's victory allowed him to take the lead of the LMP2 Drivers' Championship with 165 points while Cassels and Masson dropped to second. Bamber and Vanthoor retook the lead of the GTLM Drivers' Championship with 186 points while Pilet and Tandy dropped to second. De Phillippi jumped to fourth after being fifth coming into Canadian Tire Motorsport Park. The final results of GTD meant Farnbacher and Hindman extended their advantage to 19 points while Montecalvo and Bell took over second position. Auberlen and Foley advanced from eighth to third. Acura and Porsche continued to top their respective Manufacturers' Championships, while Acura took the lead of the GTD Manufactures' Championship. Acura Team Penske, Porsche GT Team, and Meyer Shank Racing kept their respective advantages in their Teams' Championships, while PR1/Mathiasen Motorsports took the lead of the LMP2 Teams' Championship with five rounds left in the season.

=== Race results ===
Class winners are denoted in bold and ‡.

Pos	Class	No	Team	Drivers	Chassis	Laps	Time/Retired
Pos	Class	No	Team	Drivers	Engine	Laps	Time/Retired
1	**DPi**	**77**	**(Germany) Mazda Team Joest**	**(United Kingdom) Oliver Jarvis (United States) Tristan Nunez**	**Mazda RT24-P**	**125**	**2:40:10.680‡**
1	**DPi**	**77**	**(Germany) Mazda Team Joest**	**(United Kingdom) Oliver Jarvis (United States) Tristan Nunez**	**Mazda MZ-2.0T 2.0 L Turbo I4**	**125**	**2:40:10.680‡**
2	DPi	55	(Germany) Mazda Team Joest	(United States) Jonathan Bomarito (United Kingdom) Harry Tincknell	Mazda RT24-P	125	+1.699
2	DPi	55	(Germany) Mazda Team Joest	(United States) Jonathan Bomarito (United Kingdom) Harry Tincknell	Mazda MZ-2.0T 2.0 L Turbo I4	125	+1.699
3	DPi	6	(United States) Acura Team Penske	(United States) Dane Cameron (Colombia) Juan Pablo Montoya	Acura ARX-05	125	+2.502
3	DPi	6	(United States) Acura Team Penske	(United States) Dane Cameron (Colombia) Juan Pablo Montoya	Acura AR35TT 3.5 L Turbo V6	125	+2.502
4	DPi	31	(United States) Whelen Engineering Racing	(Brazil) Pipo Derani (Brazil) Felipe Nasr	Cadillac DPi-V.R	125	+4.708
4	DPi	31	(United States) Whelen Engineering Racing	(Brazil) Pipo Derani (Brazil) Felipe Nasr	Cadillac 5.5 L V8	125	+4.708
5	DPi	7	(United States) Acura Team Penske	(Brazil) Hélio Castroneves (United States) Ricky Taylor	Acura ARX-05	125	+5.058
5	DPi	7	(United States) Acura Team Penske	(Brazil) Hélio Castroneves (United States) Ricky Taylor	Acura AR35TT 3.5 L Turbo V6	125	+5.058
6	DPi	10	(United States) Konica Minolta Cadillac	(United States) Jordan Taylor (Netherlands) Renger van der Zande	Cadillac DPi-V.R	125	+11.747
6	DPi	10	(United States) Konica Minolta Cadillac	(United States) Jordan Taylor (Netherlands) Renger van der Zande	Cadillac 5.5 L V8	125	+11.747
7	DPi	54	(United States) CORE Autosport	(United States) Jon Bennett (United States) Colin Braun	Ligier Nissan DPi	125	+34.322
7	DPi	54	(United States) CORE Autosport	(United States) Jon Bennett (United States) Colin Braun	Nissan VR38DETT 3.8 L Turbo V6	125	+34.322
8	DPi	84	(United States) JDC-Miller MotorSports	(South Africa) Stephen Simpson (Switzerland) Simon Trummer	Cadillac DPi-V.R	124	+1 Lap
8	DPi	84	(United States) JDC-Miller MotorSports	(South Africa) Stephen Simpson (Switzerland) Simon Trummer	Cadillac 5.5 L V8	124	+1 Lap
9	DPi	85	(United States) JDC-Miller MotorSports	(Canada) Misha Goikhberg (France) Tristan Vautier	Cadillac DPi-V.R	122	+3 Laps
9	DPi	85	(United States) JDC-Miller MotorSports	(Canada) Misha Goikhberg (France) Tristan Vautier	Cadillac 5.5 L V8	122	+3 Laps
10	**LMP2**	**52**	**(United States) PR1 Mathiasen Motorsports**	**(Canada) Dalton Kellett (United States) Matt McMurry**	**Oreca 07**	**120**	**+5 Laps‡**
10	**LMP2**	**52**	**(United States) PR1 Mathiasen Motorsports**	**(Canada) Dalton Kellett (United States) Matt McMurry**	**Gibson GK428 4.2 L V8**	**120**	**+5 Laps‡**
11 DNF	DPi	5	(United States) Mustang Sampling Racing	(Portugal) Filipe Albuquerque (Portugal) João Barbosa	Cadillac DPi-V.R	119	Clutch
11 DNF	DPi	5	(United States) Mustang Sampling Racing	(Portugal) Filipe Albuquerque (Portugal) João Barbosa	Cadillac 5.5 L V8	119	Clutch
12	**GTLM**	**912**	**(United States) Porsche GT Team**	**(New Zealand) Earl Bamber (Belgium) Laurens Vanthoor**	**Porsche 911 RSR**	**116**	**+9 Laps‡**
12	**GTLM**	**912**	**(United States) Porsche GT Team**	**(New Zealand) Earl Bamber (Belgium) Laurens Vanthoor**	**Porsche 4.0 L Flat-6**	**116**	**+9 Laps‡**
13	GTLM	24	(United States) BMW Team RLL	(United States) John Edwards (Finland) Jesse Krohn	BMW M8 GTE	116	+9 Laps
13	GTLM	24	(United States) BMW Team RLL	(United States) John Edwards (Finland) Jesse Krohn	BMW S63 4.0 L Turbo V8	116	+9 Laps
14	GTLM	911	(United States) Porsche GT Team	(France) Patrick Pilet (United Kingdom) Nick Tandy	Porsche 911 RSR	116	+9 Laps
14	GTLM	911	(United States) Porsche GT Team	(France) Patrick Pilet (United Kingdom) Nick Tandy	Porsche 4.0 L Flat-6	116	+9 Laps
15	GTLM	25	(United States) BMW Team RLL	(United Kingdom) Tom Blomqvist (United States) Connor De Phillippi	BMW M8 GTE	116	+9 Laps
15	GTLM	25	(United States) BMW Team RLL	(United Kingdom) Tom Blomqvist (United States) Connor De Phillippi	BMW S63 4.0 L Turbo V8	116	+9 Laps
16	GTLM	67	(United States) Ford Chip Ganassi Racing	(Australia) Ryan Briscoe (United Kingdom) Richard Westbrook	Ford GT	116	+9 Laps
16	GTLM	67	(United States) Ford Chip Ganassi Racing	(Australia) Ryan Briscoe (United Kingdom) Richard Westbrook	Ford EcoBoost 3.5 L Turbo V6	116	+9 Laps
17	GTLM	66	(United States) Ford Chip Ganassi Racing	(United States) Joey Hand (Germany) Dirk Müller	Ford GT	116	+9 Laps
17	GTLM	66	(United States) Ford Chip Ganassi Racing	(United States) Joey Hand (Germany) Dirk Müller	Ford EcoBoost 3.5 L Turbo V6	116	+9 Laps
18	GTLM	3	(United States) Corvette Racing	(Spain) Antonio García (Denmark) Jan Magnussen	Chevrolet Corvette C7.R	116	+9 Laps
18	GTLM	3	(United States) Corvette Racing	(Spain) Antonio García (Denmark) Jan Magnussen	Chevrolet 5.5 L V8	116	+9 Laps
19	GTLM	4	(United States) Corvette Racing	(Switzerland) Marcel Fässler (United Kingdom) Oliver Gavin	Chevrolet Corvette C7.R	116	+9 Laps
19	GTLM	4	(United States) Corvette Racing	(Switzerland) Marcel Fässler (United Kingdom) Oliver Gavin	Chevrolet 5.5 L V8	116	+9 Laps
20	**GTD**	**96**	**(United States) Turner Motorsport**	**(United States) Bill Auberlen (United States) Robby Foley**	**BMW M6 GT3**	**113**	**+12 Laps‡**
20	**GTD**	**96**	**(United States) Turner Motorsport**	**(United States) Bill Auberlen (United States) Robby Foley**	**BMW 4.4 L Turbo V8**	**113**	**+12 Laps‡**
21	GTD	86	(United States) Meyer Shank Racing w/ Curb-Agajanian	(Germany) Mario Farnbacher (United States) Trent Hindman	Acura NSX GT3 Evo	113	+12 Laps
21	GTD	86	(United States) Meyer Shank Racing w/ Curb-Agajanian	(Germany) Mario Farnbacher (United States) Trent Hindman	Acura 3.5 L Turbo V6	113	+12 Laps
22	GTD	12	(Canada) AIM Vasser Sullivan	(United States) Townsend Bell (United States) Frankie Montecalvo	Lexus RC F GT3	113	+12 Laps
22	GTD	12	(Canada) AIM Vasser Sullivan	(United States) Townsend Bell (United States) Frankie Montecalvo	Lexus 5.0 L V8	113	+12 Laps
23	GTD	73	(United States) Park Place Motorsports	(United States) Patrick Lindsey (United States) Patrick Long	Porsche 911 GT3 R	113	+12 Laps
23	GTD	73	(United States) Park Place Motorsports	(United States) Patrick Lindsey (United States) Patrick Long	Porsche 4.0 L Flat-6	113	+12 Laps
24	GTD	9	(Canada) Pfaff Motorsports	(Canada) Scott Hargrove (Canada) Zacharie Robichon	Porsche 911 GT3 R	113	+12 Laps
24	GTD	9	(Canada) Pfaff Motorsports	(Canada) Scott Hargrove (Canada) Zacharie Robichon	Porsche 4.0 L Flat-6	113	+12 Laps
25	GTD	57	(United States) Heinricher Racing w/ Meyer Shank Racing	(Brazil) Bia Figueiredo (United Kingdom) Katherine Legge	Acura NSX GT3 Evo	113	+12 Laps
25	GTD	57	(United States) Heinricher Racing w/ Meyer Shank Racing	(Brazil) Bia Figueiredo (United Kingdom) Katherine Legge	Acura 3.5 L Turbo V6	113	+12 Laps
26	GTD	33	(United States) Mercedes-AMG Team Riley Motorsports	(Netherlands) Jeroen Bleekemolen (United States) Ben Keating	Mercedes-AMG GT3	113	+12 Laps
26	GTD	33	(United States) Mercedes-AMG Team Riley Motorsports	(Netherlands) Jeroen Bleekemolen (United States) Ben Keating	Mercedes-AMG M159 6.2 L V8	113	+12 Laps
27	GTD	44	(United States) Magnus Racing	(United States) Andy Lally (United States) John Potter	Lamborghini Huracán GT3 Evo	113	+12 Laps
27	GTD	44	(United States) Magnus Racing	(United States) Andy Lally (United States) John Potter	Lamborghini 5.2 L V10	113	+12 Laps
28	GTD	63	(United States) Scuderia Corsa	(United States) Cooper MacNeil (Finland) Toni Vilander	Ferrari 488 GT3	113	+12 Laps
28	GTD	63	(United States) Scuderia Corsa	(United States) Cooper MacNeil (Finland) Toni Vilander	Ferrari F154CB 3.9 L Turbo V8	113	+12 Laps
29	GTD	76	(Canada) Compass Racing	(United States) Paul Holton (United States) Matt Plumb	McLaren 720S GT3	113	+12 Laps
29	GTD	76	(Canada) Compass Racing	(United States) Paul Holton (United States) Matt Plumb	McLaren M840T 4.0 L Turbo V8	113	+12 Laps
30	GTD	74	(United States) Lone Star Racing	(United States) Lawson Aschenbach (United States) Gar Robinson	Mercedes-AMG GT3	112	+13 Laps
30	GTD	74	(United States) Lone Star Racing	(United States) Lawson Aschenbach (United States) Gar Robinson	Mercedes-AMG M159 6.2 L V8	112	+13 Laps
31	LMP2	38	(United States) Performance Tech Motorsports	(Canada) Cameron Cassels (United States) Kyle Masson	Oreca 07	101	Crash
31	LMP2	38	(United States) Performance Tech Motorsports	(Canada) Cameron Cassels (United States) Kyle Masson	Gibson GK428 4.2 L V8	101	Crash
32 DNF	DPi	50	(Argentina) Juncos Racing	(Brazil) Victor Franzoni (United States) Will Owen	Cadillac DPi-V.R	100	Crash
32 DNF	DPi	50	(Argentina) Juncos Racing	(Brazil) Victor Franzoni (United States) Will Owen	Cadillac 5.5 L V8	100	Crash
33 DNF	GTD	14	(Canada) AIM Vasser Sullivan	(United Kingdom) Jack Hawksworth (United States) Richard Heistand	Lexus RC F GT3	76	Crash Damage
33 DNF	GTD	14	(Canada) AIM Vasser Sullivan	(United Kingdom) Jack Hawksworth (United States) Richard Heistand	Lexus 5.0 L V8	76	Crash Damage
34	GTD	48	(United States) Paul Miller Racing	(United States) Ryan Hardwick (United States) Bryan Sellers	Lamborghini Huracán GT3 Evo	Did Not Start	
34	GTD	48	(United States) Paul Miller Racing	(United States) Ryan Hardwick (United States) Bryan Sellers	Lamborghini 5.2 L V10	Did Not Start	

== Standings after the race ==
DPi Drivers' Championship standings
Pos.	+/–	Driver	Points
1		(United States) Dane Cameron (Colombia) Juan Pablo Montoya	207
2		(Brazil) Pipo Derani (Brazil) Felipe Nasr	204
3		(Brazil) Hélio Castroneves (United States) Ricky Taylor	198
4	3	(United Kingdom) Oliver Jarvis (United States) Tristan Nunez	188
5	1	(United States) Jordan Taylor (Netherlands) Renger van der Zande	188

LMP2 Drivers' Championship standings
Pos.	+/–	Driver	Points
1	1	(United States) Matt McMurry	165
2	1	(Canada) Cameron Cassels (United States) Kyle Masson	163
3		(France) Gabriel Aubry	95
4		(United States) Eric Lux	70
5		(United States) Andrew Evans	67

GTLM Drivers' Championship standings
Pos.	+/–	Driver	Points
1	1	(New Zealand) Earl Bamber (Belgium) Laurens Vanthoor	186
2	1	(France) Patrick Pilet (United Kingdom) Nick Tandy	182
3		(Spain) Antonio García (Denmark) Jan Magnussen	175
4	1	(United States) Connor De Phillippi	163
5	1	(Germany) Dirk Müller	161

GTD Drivers' Championship standings
Pos.	+/–	Driver	Points
1		(Germany) Mario Farnbacher (United States) Trent Hindman	151
2	1	(United States) Frankie Montecalvo (United States) Townsend Bell	132
3	5	(United States) Bill Auberlen (United States) Robby Foley	123
4		(United States) Andy Lally (United States) John Potter	123
5		(United States) Patrick Long	123

- Note: Only the top five positions are included for all sets of standings.

DPi Teams' Championship standings
Pos.	+/–	Team	Points
1		(United States) #6 Acura Team Penske	207
2		(United States) #31 Whelen Engineering Racing	204
3		(United States) #7 Acura Team Penske	198
4	3	(Germany) #77 Mazda Team Joest	188
5	1	(United States) #10 Konica Minolta Cadillac	188

LMP2 Teams' Championship standings
Pos.	+/–	Team	Points
1	1	(United States) #52 PR1/Mathiasen Motorsports	165
2	1	(United States) #38 Performance Tech Motorsports	163
3		(United States) #18 DragonSpeed	35
4		(United States) #81 DragonSpeed	30

GTLM Teams' Championship standings
Pos.	+/–	Team	Points
1	1	(United States) #912 Porsche GT Team	186
2	1	(United States) #911 Porsche GT Team	182
3		(United States) #3 Corvette Racing	175
4	1	(United States) #25 BMW Team RLL	163
5	1	(United States) #66 Ford Chip Ganassi Racing	161

GTD Teams' Championship standings
Pos.	+/–	Team	Points
1		(United States) #86 Meyer-Shank Racing with Curb Agajanian	151
2	1	(Canada) #12 AIM Vasser Sullivan	132
3	1	(United States) #96 Turner Motorsport	123
4		(United States) #44 Magnus Racing	123
5		(United States) #73 Park Place Motorsports	123

- Note: Only the top five positions are included for all sets of standings.

DPi Manufacturers' Championship standings
Pos.	+/–	Manufacturer	Points
1		(Japan) Acura	230
2		(United States) Cadillac	227
3		(Japan) Mazda	216
4		(Japan) Nissan	202

GTLM Manufacturers' Championship standings
Pos.	+/–	Manufacturer	Points
1		(Germany) Porsche	205
2	1	(Germany) BMW	181
3	1	(United States) Chevrolet	180
4		(United States) Ford	178
5		(Italy) Ferrari	32

GTD Manufacturers' Championship standings
Pos.	+/–	Manufacturer	Points
1	1	(Japan) Acura	152
2	1	(Italy) Lamborghini	150
3		(Japan) Lexus	149
4	4	(Germany) BMW	135
5	1	(Italy) Ferrari	135

- Note: Only the top five positions are included for all sets of standings.

IMSA SportsCar Championship
Previous race: 2019 6 Hours of The Glen	2019 season	Next race: 2019 Northeast Grand Prix
