= Ralt RT-40 =

British open-wheel race car

Ralt RT-40 Ralt RT-41
- Category: Formula Atlantic
- Constructor: Ralt

Technical specifications
- Chassis: Carbon fiber monocoque, fiberglass/kevlar body
- Suspension: Steel wishbones, push-rod-actuated coil springs over shock absorbers
- Length: 4,250 mm (167 in)
- Width: 2,000 mm (79 in)
- Height: 993 mm (39.1 in)
- Axle track: 1,676 mm (66.0 in) (front); 1,549 mm (61.0 in) (rear)
- Wheelbase: 2,642 mm (104.0 in)
- Engine: Toyota 4A-GE 1,600 cc (97.6 cu in) L4 mid-engined
- Transmission: Hewland 4/5-speed manual
- Power: 250 hp (190 kW)
- Weight: ~ 944–1,250 lb (428.2–567.0 kg)
- Fuel: VP Racing Fuels 102-RON Unleaded gasoline
- Tyres: Hoosier

Competition history
- Debut: 1993

The Ralt RT-40, and its evolution, the Ralt RT-41, are open-wheel Formula Atlantic-spec formula race cars, designed, developed and built by British manufacturer Ralt, for the Atlantic Championship, between 1993 and 2003.
