= 2019 6 Hours of The Glen =

Motorsport endurance race

Track Map of Watkins Glen International.

The 2019 Sahlen's Six Hours of the Glen was an endurance race sanctioned by the International Motor Sports Association (IMSA). The race was held at Watkins Glen International in Watkins Glen, New York, on June 30, 2019. This race was the sixth round of the 2019 WeatherTech SportsCar Championship, as well as the third round of the 2019 Michelin Endurance Cup.

== Background ==
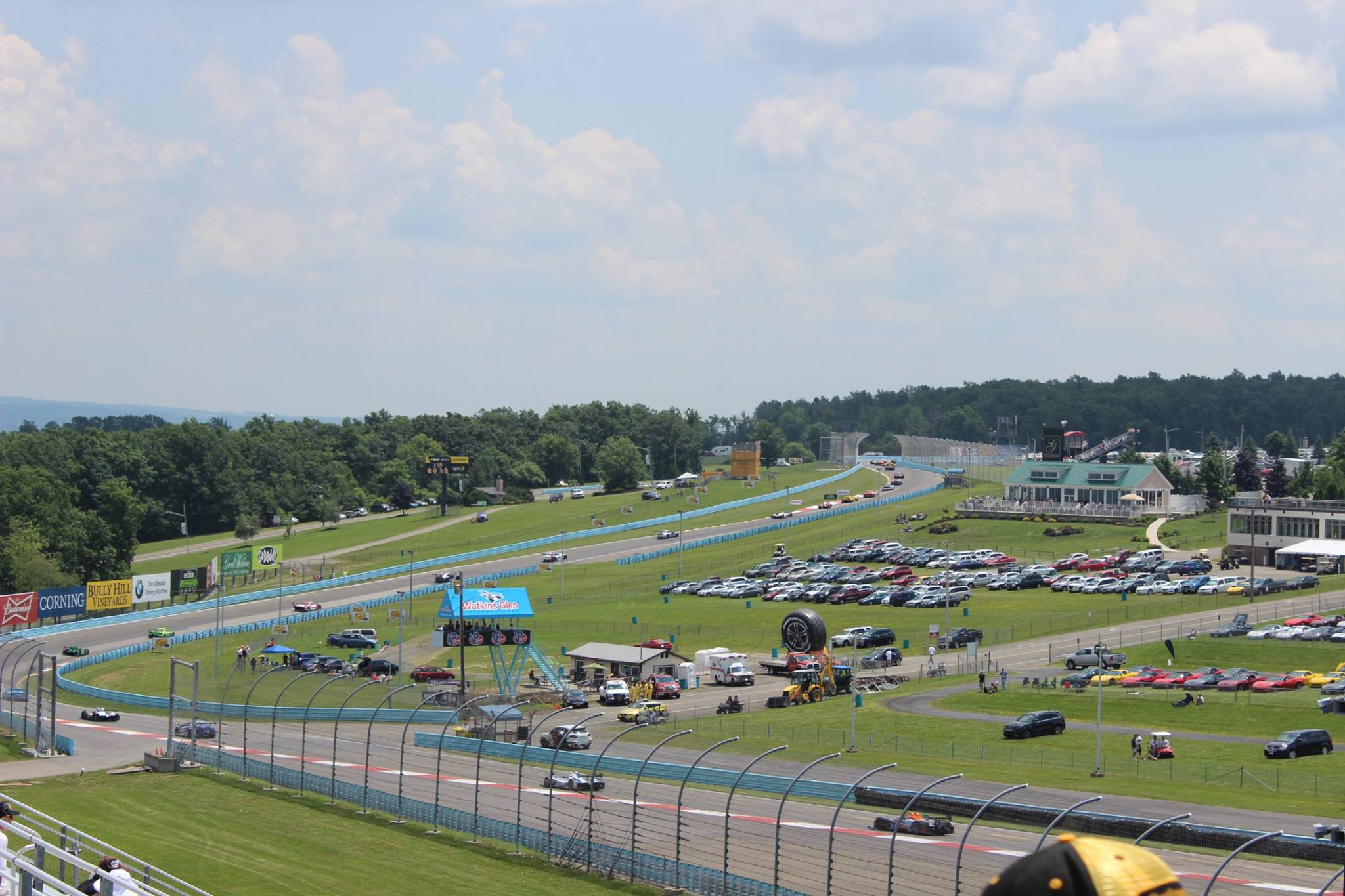
Watkins Glen International, where the race was held.

International Motor Sports Association's (IMSA) president Scott Atherton confirmed the race was part of the schedule for the 2019 IMSA SportsCar Championship (IMSA SCC) in August 2018. It was the sixth consecutive year the event was held as part of the WeatherTech SportsCar Championship. The 2019 6 Hours of The Glen was the sixth of twelve sports car races of 2019 by IMSA, and it was the third of four rounds held as part of the Michelin Endurance Cup. The race was held at the eleven-turn 3.450 mi (5.552 km) Watkins Glen International in Watkins Glen, New York on June 30, 2019.

IMSA released two separate technical bulletins regarding the Balance of Performance for the six-hour race. The first one was released on May 23, 2019, for the GT Le Mans (GTLM) class. This was done to allow IMSA teams who were preparing for the 24 Hours of Le Mans in three weeks time, notably Corvette Racing and Chip Ganassi Racing, to have the beforehand knowledge of the Balance of Performance for the race so they could prepare better. In this bulletin, the BMW M8 GTE received a 12 horsepower increase, as well as a six liter increase in fuel capacity and turbo boost increase. The second technical bulletin was released on June 19, 2019, which regarded the Balance of Performance for the Daytona Prototype International (DPi) and GT Daytona (GTD) classes. In DPi, after winning the previous two events, Team Penske's Acura ARX-05 was given a 15-kilogram weight increase, giving it the same weight as the Nissan DPi. The Cadillac DPi-V.R was given a 1-liter reduction in fuel capacity. In GT Daytona, despite no McLarens participating in the 6 Hour event, the McLaren 720S was given a power increase of 15 horsepower and made 25 kilograms lighter, in addition to a 12-liter fuel capacity increase. These adjustments made the McLaren 720S the lightest car in the class, as well as having the largest fuel capacity.

Before the race, Pipo Derani and Felipe Nasr led the DPi Drivers' Championship with 152 points, ahead of Dane Cameron and Juan Pablo Montoya in second with 147 points. In LMP2, Cameron Cassels and Kyle Masson led the Drivers' Championship with 99 points; the duo held a four-point advantage over Matt McMurry. The GTLM Drivers' Championship was led by Earl Bamber and Laurens Vanthoor with 126 points, 7 points ahead of Antonio García and Jan Magnussen in second followed by Patrick Pilet and Nick Tandy with 117 points in third. With 84 points, Mario Farnbacher and Trent Hindman led the Drivers' Championship, 4 points clear of Frankie Montecalvo and Townsend Bell. Cadillac, Porsche, and Lamborghini were leading their respective Manufacturers' Championships, while Whelen Engineering Racing, Performance Tech Motorsports, Porsche GT Team, and Meyer Shank Racing each led their own Teams' Championships.

=== Entries ===
A total of 37 cars took part in the event split across four classes. There were 11 entries in Daytona Prototype international, eight cars in GT Le Mans, 16 in GT Daytona, and just two entrants in the Le Mans Prototype (LMP2) class. In GT Daytona, Sprint-race-only entrants Compass Racing and Lone Star Racing would not be taking part, while endurance-event-only entrants such as Land-Motorsport made their return. Black Swan Racing also returned to the grid after missing the 12 Hours of Sebring due to their team owner Tim Pappas sustaining an injury. As he was still recovering, Marc Miller took his place for The Glen. Joey Hand made a full recovery from suffering symptoms of the flu, and returned to the Chip Ganassi Racing team after being replaced by Sebastien Bourdais for the previous two rounds.

== Practice ==
There were three practice sessions preceding the start of the race on Saturday, two on Friday and one on Saturday. The first session on Friday morning lasted 75 minutes while the second session on Friday afternoon lasted one hour. The third on Saturday morning lasted one hour.

=== Practice 1 ===
The first practice session took place at 10:25 am ET on Friday and ended with Harry Tincknell topping the charts for Mazda Team Joest, with a lap time of 1:30.690. Hélio Castroneves was second fastest in the No. 7 Acura followed by Dane Cameron in the sister No. 6 Acura Team Penske entry. Gabriel Aubry set the fastest time in LMP2. The GTLM class was topped by the No. 67 Ford Chip Ganassi Racing Ford GT of Richard Westbrook with a time of 1:42.673. Dirk Müller was second fastest in the No. 66 Ford GT followed by Tommy Milner in the No. 4 Corvette. The GTD class was topped by the No. 44 Magnus Racing Lamborghini Huracán GT3 Evo of Andy Lally with a time of 1:45.406. Bill Auberlen in the No. 96 BMW was second fastest followed by Dirk Werner in the No. 540 Black Swan Racing Porsche. The session was red flagged two times. 20 minutes into the session, Chris Miller's No. 84 JDC-Miller Motorsports Cadillac stopped at the inner loop. The final stoppage came when Will Hardeman crashed the No. 19 Moorespeed Audi at the barrier at turn five and caught fire. Hardeman suffered a concussion and the session ended early. After practice, Moorespeed withdrew the No. 19 Audi due to the extensive damage the car received.

Pos.	Class	No.	Team	Driver	Time	Gap
1	DPi	55	Mazda Team Joest	Harry Tincknell	1:30.690	_
2	DPi	7	Acura Team Penske	Hélio Castroneves	1:30.802	+0.112
3	DPi	6	Acura Team Penske	Dane Cameron	1:31.224	+0.534

=== Practice 2 ===
The second practice session took place at 3:05 PM ET on Friday and ended with Dane Cameron topping the charts for Acura Team Penske, with a lap time of 1:30.014. Jonathan Bomarito was second fastest in the No. 55 Mazda Team Joest entry followed by Hélio Castroneves in the No. 7 Acura. Matt McMurry set the fastest in LMP2. The GTLM class was topped by the No. 67 Ford Chip Ganassi Racing Ford GT of Richard Westbrook with a time of 1:42.321. Antonio García was second fastest in the No. 3 Corvette followed by Joey Hand in the No. 66 Ford GT. The GTD class was topped by the No. 44 Magnus Racing Lamborghini Huracán GT3 Evo of Spencer Pumpelly with a time of 1:45.835. Scott Hargrove was second fastest in the No. 9 Pfaff Motorsports Porsche followed by Jack Hawksworth in the No. 14 Lexus. The session saw one stoppage when Simon Trummer's No. 84 JDC-Miller Motorsports Cadillac suffered a loss of power and stopped at turn ten.

Pos.	Class	No.	Team	Driver	Time	Gap
1	DPi	6	Acura Team Penske	Dane Cameron	1:30.014	_
2	DPi	55	Mazda Team Joest	Jonathan Bomarito	1:30.842	+0.828
3	DPi	7	Acura Team Penske	Hélio Castroneves	1:30.901	+0.887

=== Practice 3 ===
The third and final practice session took place at 8:00 am ET and ended with Oliver Jarvis topping the charts for Mazda Team Joest, with a lap time of 1:43.279. Will Owen was second fastest in the No. 50 Juncos Racing Cadillac followed by Renger van der Zande in the No. 10 Konica Minolta Cadillac entry. The GTLM class was topped by the No. 912 Porsche GT Team Porsche 911 RSR of Laurens Vanthoor with a time of 1:54.280. John Edwards was second fastest in the No. 24 BMW followed by Patrick Pilet in the No. 911 Porsche. The GTD class was topped by the No. 14 AIM Vasser Sullivan Lexus RC F GT3 of Jack Hawksworth with a time of 1:57.445. Parker Chase was second fastest in the No. 8 Starworks Motorsport Audi followed by Aaron Telitz in the No. 12 Lexus. Neither of the LMP2 entries set a lap time.

Pos.	Class	No.	Team	Driver	Time	Gap
1	DPi	77	Mazda Team Joest	Oliver Jarvis	1:43.279	_
2	DPi	50	Juncos Racing	Will Owen	1:46.738	+3.459
3	DPi	10	Konica Minolta Cadillac	Renger van der Zande	1:46.909	+3.630

== Qualifying ==
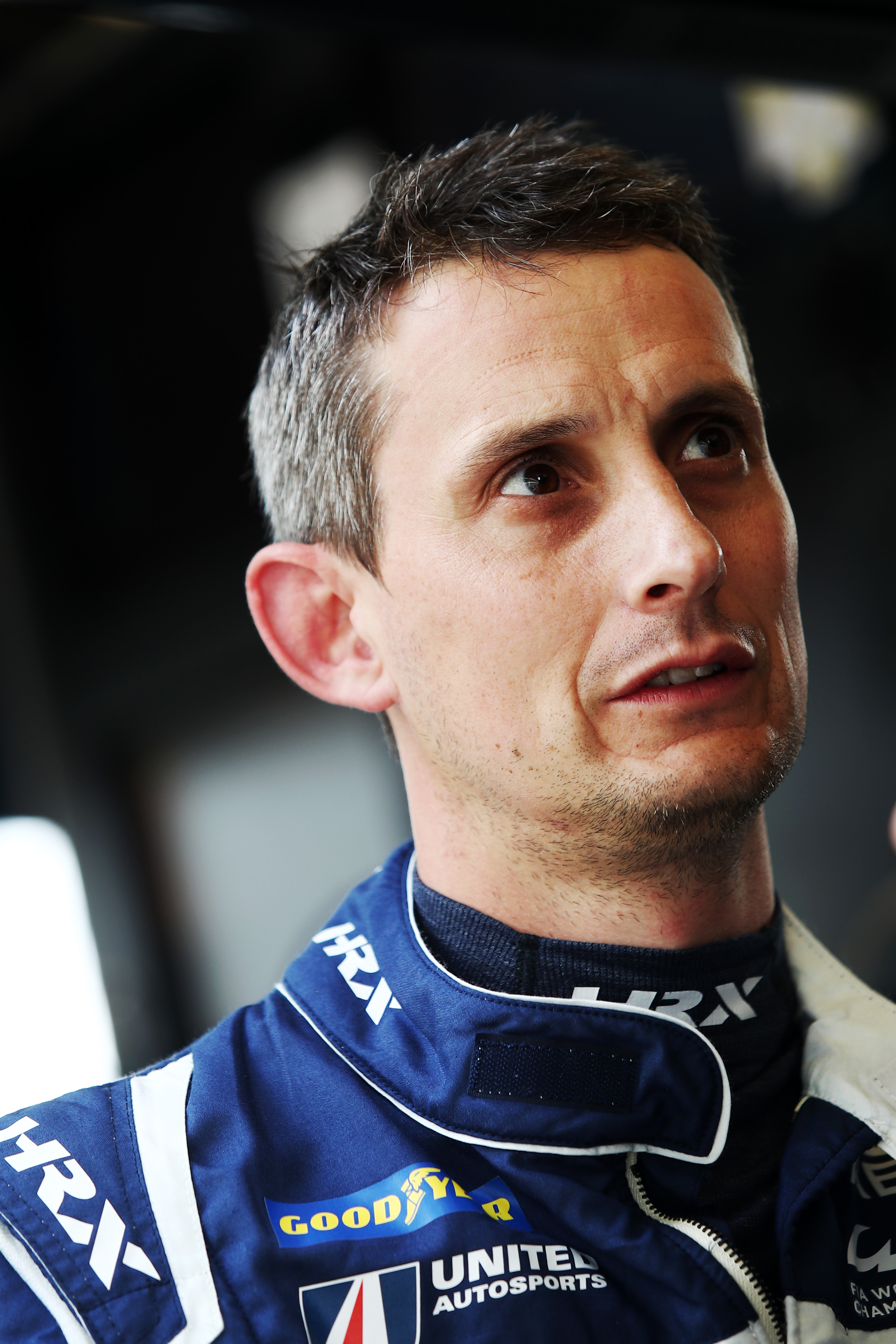
Oliver Jarvis (pictured in 2022) helped take the No. 77 Mazda's third pole position of 2019.

Saturday's late morning qualification session was broken into three sessions that lasted 15 minutes each. Cars in GTD were sent out first before those grouped in GTLM and DPi/LMP2 had two separate identically timed sessions. All cars were required to be driven by one participant and the starting order was determined by the competitor's fastest lap. IMSA then arranged the grid so that the DPi, LMP2, and GTLM cars started in front of the GTD field.

The first was for cars in the GTD class. Trent Hindman qualified on pole for the class driving the No. 86 car for Meyer Shank Racing, beating Christina Nielsen in the No. 57 Acura by more than three-tenths of a second. Following in third was Dillon Machavern's No. 96 BMW with the No. 63 Ferrari of Jeff Westphal in fourth. Ricardo Feller completed the top five in the No. 29 Montaplast by Land-Motorsport Audi followed by The No. 9 Pfaff Motorsports Porsche of Zacharie Robichon in sixth position. The No. 12 AIM Vasser Sullivan entry did not participate in the session due to the team changing the engine.

The second session was for cars in the GTLM class. Antonio García qualified on pole for the class driving the No. 3 car for Corvette Racing, beating Richard Westbrook in the No. 67 Ford Chip Ganassi Racing by 0.317 seconds. Joey Hand was third fastest, but lost his fastest lap for violating track limits. As a result, Hand would start from fifth position while Tommy Milner's No. 4 Corvette was promoted to third position followed by John Edwards in the No. 24 BMW in fourth. Connor De Phillippi in the No. 25 BMW Team RLL started from sixth place. The Porsche GT Team entries rounded out the GTLM qualifiers.

The final session of qualifying was for cars in the LMP2 and DPi classes. Oliver Jarvis qualified on pole overall driving the No. 77 car for Mazda Team Joest, beating Dane Cameron in the No. 6 Acura by more than two-tenths of a second. Ricky Taylor qualified the No. 7 Acura Team Penske entry in third position followed by Harry Tincknell's No. 55 Mazda in fourth. Renger van der Zande in the No. 10 Konica Minolta Cadillac entry started from fifth place. Following in sixth was Filipe Albuquerque's No. 5 Mustang Sampling Racing followed by Felipe Nasr in the No. 31 Whelen Engineering Racing Cadillac. Gabriel Aubry qualified on pole in LMP2 driving the No. 52 car PR1/ Mathiasen Motorsports, besting Kyle Masson in the No. 38 Performance Tech Motorsports car.

=== Qualifying results ===
Pole positions in each class are indicated in bold and by ‡.

Pos.	Class	No.	Team	Driver	Time	Gap	Grid
1	**DPi**	**77**	**(Germany) Mazda Team Joest**	**(United Kingdom) Oliver Jarvis**	**1:29.639**	**_**	1‡
2	DPi	6	(United States) Acura Team Penske	(United States) Dane Cameron	1:29.862	+0.223	2
3	DPi	7	(United States) Acura Team Penske	(United States) Ricky Taylor	1:29.928	+0.289	3
4	DPi	55	(Germany) Mazda Team Joest	(United Kingdom) Harry Tincknell	1:29.983	+0.344	4
5	DPi	10	(United States) Konica Minolta Cadillac	(Netherlands) Renger van der Zande	1:30.758	+1.119	5
6	DPi	5	(United States) Mustang Sampling Racing	(Portugal) Filipe Albuquerque	1:31.170	+1.531	6
7	DPi	31	(United States) Whelen Engineering Racing	(Brazil) Felipe Nasr	1:31.177	+1.538	7
8	**LMP2**	**52**	**(United States) PR1/ Mathiasen Motorsports**	**(France) Gabriel Aubry**	**1:31.735**	**+2.096**	12‡
9	DPi	85	(United States) JDC-Miller Motorsports	(Canada) Misha Goikhberg	1:32.316	+2.677	8
10	DPi	84	(United States) JDC-Miller Motorsports	(Switzerland) Simon Trummer	1:32.409	+2.770	9
11	LMP2	38	(United States) Performance Tech Motorsports	(United States) Kyle Masson	1:32.459	+2.820	13
12	DPi	50	(Argentina) Juncos Racing	(Austria) René Binder	1:33.134	+3.495	10
13	DPi	54	(United States) CORE Autosport	(United States) Jon Bennett	1:33.466	+3.827	11
14	**GTLM**	**3**	**(United States) Corvette Racing**	**(Spain) Antonio García**	**1:40.799**	**+11.160**	14‡
15	GTLM	67	(United States) Ford Chip Ganassi Racing	(United Kingdom) Richard Westbrook	1:41.116	+11.477	15
16	GTLM	4	(United States) Corvette Racing	(United States) Tommy Milner	1:41.291	+11.652	16
17	GTLM	24	(United States) BMW Team RLL	(United States) John Edwards	1:41.301	+11.662	17
18	GTLM	66	(United States) Ford Chip Ganassi Racing	(United States) Joey Hand	1:41.304	+11.665	18
19	GTLM	25	(United States) BMW Team RLL	(United States) Connor De Phillippi	1:41.414	+11.775	19
20	GTLM	911	(United States) Porsche GT Team	(United Kingdom) Nick Tandy	1:41.545	+11.906	21^{1}
21	GTLM	912	(United States) Porsche GT Team	(Belgium) Laurens Vanthoor	1:42.206	+12.567	20
22	**GTD**	**86**	**(United States) Meyer Shank Racing with Curb-Agajanian**	**(United States) Trent Hindman**	**1:44.978**	**+15.339**	22‡
23	GTD	57	(United States) Heinricher Racing w/Meyer Shank Racing	(Denmark) Christina Nielsen	1:45.295	+15.656	23
24	GTD	96	(United States) Turner Motorsport	(United States) Dillon Machavern	1:45.506	+15.867	24
25	GTD	63	(United States) Scuderia Corsa	(United States) Jeff Westphal	1:45.595	+15.856	25
26	GTD	29	(Germany) Montaplast by Land-Motorsport	(Switzerland) Ricardo Feller	1:45.597	+15.858	26
27	GTD	9	(Canada) Pfaff Motorsports	(Canada) Zacharie Robichon	1:45.842	+16.203	27
28	GTD	33	(United States) Mercedes-AMG Team Riley Motorsports	(United States) Ben Keating	1:45.961	+16.322	28
29	GTD	14	(Canada) AIM Vasser Sullivan	(United States) Richard Heistand	1:46.066	+16.427	29
30	GTD	540	(United States) Black Swan Racing	(Germany) Marco Seefried	1:46.100	+16.461	30
31	GTD	47	(United States) Precision Performance Motorsports	(United States) Brandon Gdovic	1:46.388	+16.749	31
32	GTD	48	(United States) Paul Miller Racing	(United States) Ryan Hardwick	1:46.620	+16.981	32
33	GTD	44	(United States) Magnus Racing	(United States) John Potter	1:47.041	+17.402	33
34	GTD	8	(United States) Starworks Motorsport	(United States) Parker Chase	1:48.041	+18.402	34
35	GTD	73	(United States) Park Place Motorsports	(United States) Nicholas Boulle	1:48.923	+19.284	35
36	GTD	12	(Canada) AIM Vasser Sullivan	None	No time	_	37^{2}
37	GTD	19	(United States) Moorespeed	None	No time	_	36
Sources:

- ^{1}The No. 911 Porsche GT Team entry initially qualified eighth for the GTLM class.However, the team changed engines. By IMSA rules, the entry was moved to the rear of the GTLM field on the starting grid.
- ^{2} The No. 12 AIM Vasser Sullivan entry initially qualified fifteenth for the GTD class.However, the team changed engines. By IMSA rules, the entry was moved to the rear of the GTD field on the starting grid.

== Race ==
=== Post-race ===
With a total of 177 points, Cameron and Montoya's third place finish allowed them to take the lead of the DPi Drivers' Championship while Derani and Nasr dropped to second. Jordan Taylor and Renger van der Zande advanced from fourth to third. The final results of LMP2 kept Cassels and Masson atop the Drivers' Championship, but their advantage was reduced to one point by race winner McMurry. Lux advanced from sixth to fourth. Pilet and Tandy took the lead of the GTLM Drivers' Championship while Bamber and Vanthoor dropped to second. Müller jumped to fourth and being fifth coming into Watkins Glen. With a total of 119 points, Farnbacher and Hindman's victory allowed them to extend their advantage to 16 points while Heistand and Hawksworth took over second position in the GTD Drivers' Championship. Porsche and Lamborghini continued to top their respective Manufacturers' Championships, while Acura took the lead of the DPi Manufactures' Championship. Performance Tech Motorsports, Porsche GT Team, and Meyer Shank Racing kept their respective advantages in their Teams' Championships, while Acura Team Penske took the lead of the DPi Teams Championship with six rounds left in the season.

=== Race results ===
Class winners are denoted in bold and ‡.

Pos	Class	No.	Team	Drivers	Chassis	Laps	Time/Gap To/Reason Retired
Pos	Class	No.	Team	Drivers	Engine	Laps	Time/Gap To/Reason Retired
1	**DPi**	**55**	**(Germany) Mazda Team Joest**	**(United States) Jonathan Bomarito (France) Olivier Pla (United Kingdom) Harry Tincknell**	**Mazda RT24-P**	**211**	**6:00:07.332‡**
1	**DPi**	**55**	**(Germany) Mazda Team Joest**	**(United States) Jonathan Bomarito (France) Olivier Pla (United Kingdom) Harry Tincknell**	**Mazda MZ-2.0T 2.0 L Turbo I4**	**211**	**6:00:07.332‡**
2	DPi	77	(Germany) Mazda Team Joest	(Germany) Timo Bernhard (United Kingdom) Oliver Jarvis (United States) Tristan Nunez	Mazda RT24-P	211	+0.353s
2	DPi	77	(Germany) Mazda Team Joest	(Germany) Timo Bernhard (United Kingdom) Oliver Jarvis (United States) Tristan Nunez	Mazda MZ-2.0T 2.0 L Turbo I4	211	+0.353s
3	DPi	6	(United States) Acura Team Penske	(United States) Dane Cameron (Colombia) Juan Pablo Montoya	Acura ARX-05	211	+11.783s
3	DPi	6	(United States) Acura Team Penske	(United States) Dane Cameron (Colombia) Juan Pablo Montoya	Acura AR35TT 3.5 L Turbo V6	211	+11.783s
4	DPi	10	(United States) Konica Minolta Cadillac	(United States) Jordan Taylor (Netherlands) Renger van der Zande	Cadillac DPi-V.R	211	+24.837s
4	DPi	10	(United States) Konica Minolta Cadillac	(United States) Jordan Taylor (Netherlands) Renger van der Zande	Cadillac 5.5 L V8	211	+24.837s
5	DPi	7	(United States) Acura Team Penske	(Brazil) Hélio Castroneves (United States) Ricky Taylor	Acura ARX-05	211	+38.864s
5	DPi	7	(United States) Acura Team Penske	(Brazil) Hélio Castroneves (United States) Ricky Taylor	Acura AR35TT 3.5 L Turbo V6	211	+38.864s
6	DPi	5	(United States) Mustang Sampling Racing	(Portugal) Filipe Albuquerque (Portugal) João Barbosa (United Kingdom) Mike Conway	Cadillac DPi-V.R	209	+2 laps
6	DPi	5	(United States) Mustang Sampling Racing	(Portugal) Filipe Albuquerque (Portugal) João Barbosa (United Kingdom) Mike Conway	Cadillac 5.5 L V8	209	+2 laps
7	DPi	31	(United States) Whelen Engineering Racing	(United States) Eric Curran (Brazil) Pipo Derani (Brazil) Felipe Nasr	Cadillac DPi-V.R	208	+3 laps
7	DPi	31	(United States) Whelen Engineering Racing	(United States) Eric Curran (Brazil) Pipo Derani (Brazil) Felipe Nasr	Cadillac 5.5 L V8	208	+3 laps
8	DPi	50	(Argentina) Juncos Racing	(Austria) René Binder (United States) Will Owen	Cadillac DPi-V.R	206	+5 laps
8	DPi	50	(Argentina) Juncos Racing	(Austria) René Binder (United States) Will Owen	Cadillac 5.5 L V8	206	+5 laps
9	DPi	84	(United States) JDC-Miller Motorsports	(United States) Chris Miller (South Africa) Stephen Simpson (Switzerland) Simon Trummer	Cadillac DPi-V.R	204	+7 laps
9	DPi	84	(United States) JDC-Miller Motorsports	(United States) Chris Miller (South Africa) Stephen Simpson (Switzerland) Simon Trummer	Cadillac 5.5 L V8	204	+7 laps
10	**LMP2**	**52**	**(United States) PR1/Mathiasen Motorsports**	**(France) Gabriel Aubry (United States) Eric Lux (United States) Matt McMurry**	**Oreca 07**	**201**	**+10 laps‡**
10	**LMP2**	**52**	**(United States) PR1/Mathiasen Motorsports**	**(France) Gabriel Aubry (United States) Eric Lux (United States) Matt McMurry**	**Gibson GK428 4.2 L V8**	**201**	**+10 laps‡**
11	DPi	85	(United States) JDC-Miller Motorsports	(Canada) Misha Goikhberg (Colombia) Juan Piedrahita (France) Tristan Vautier	Cadillac DPi-V.R	199	+12 laps
11	DPi	85	(United States) JDC-Miller Motorsports	(Canada) Misha Goikhberg (Colombia) Juan Piedrahita (France) Tristan Vautier	Cadillac 5.5 L V8	199	+12 laps
12	**GTLM**	**911**	**(United States) Porsche GT Team**	**(France) Patrick Pilet (United Kingdom) Nick Tandy**	**Porsche 911 RSR**	**195**	**+16 laps‡**
12	**GTLM**	**911**	**(United States) Porsche GT Team**	**(France) Patrick Pilet (United Kingdom) Nick Tandy**	**Porsche 4.0 L Flat-6**	**195**	**+16 laps‡**
13	GTLM	3	(United States) Corvette Racing	(Spain) Antonio García (Denmark) Jan Magnussen	Chevrolet Corvette C7.R	195	+16 laps
13	GTLM	3	(United States) Corvette Racing	(Spain) Antonio García (Denmark) Jan Magnussen	Chevrolet LT5.5 5.5 L V8	195	+16 laps
14	GTLM	67	(United States) Ford Chip Ganassi Racing	(Australia) Ryan Briscoe (United Kingdom) Richard Westbrook	Ford GT	194	+17 laps
14	GTLM	67	(United States) Ford Chip Ganassi Racing	(Australia) Ryan Briscoe (United Kingdom) Richard Westbrook	Ford EcoBoost 3.5 L Turbo V6	194	+17 laps
15	GTLM	66	(United States) Ford Chip Ganassi Racing	(United States) Joey Hand (Germany) Dirk Müller	Ford GT	194	+17 laps
15	GTLM	66	(United States) Ford Chip Ganassi Racing	(United States) Joey Hand (Germany) Dirk Müller	Ford EcoBoost 3.5 L Turbo V6	194	+17 laps
16	GTLM	24	(United States) BMW Team RLL	(United States) John Edwards (Finland) Jesse Krohn	BMW M8 GTE	194	+17 laps
16	GTLM	24	(United States) BMW Team RLL	(United States) John Edwards (Finland) Jesse Krohn	BMW S63 4.0 L Twin-turbo V8	194	+17 laps
17	GTLM	912	(United States) Porsche GT Team	(New Zealand) Earl Bamber (Belgium) Laurens Vanthoor	Porsche 911 RSR	194	+17 laps
17	GTLM	912	(United States) Porsche GT Team	(New Zealand) Earl Bamber (Belgium) Laurens Vanthoor	Porsche 4.0 L Flat-6	194	+17 laps
18	**GTD**	**86**	**(United States) Meyer Shank Racing with Curb-Agajanian**	**(Germany) Mario Farnbacher (United States) Trent Hindman (United States) Justin Marks**	**Acura NSX GT3**	**188**	**+23 laps‡**
18	**GTD**	**86**	**(United States) Meyer Shank Racing with Curb-Agajanian**	**(Germany) Mario Farnbacher (United States) Trent Hindman (United States) Justin Marks**	**Acura 3.5 L Turbo V6**	**188**	**+23 laps‡**
19	GTD	96	(United States) Turner Motorsport	(United States) Bill Auberlen (United States) Robby Foley (United States) Dillon Machavern	BMW M6 GT3	188	+23 laps
19	GTD	96	(United States) Turner Motorsport	(United States) Bill Auberlen (United States) Robby Foley (United States) Dillon Machavern	BMW 4.4 L Turbo V8	188	+23 laps
20	GTD	63	(United States) Scuderia Corsa	(United States) Cooper MacNeil (Finland) Toni Vilander (United States) Jeff Westphal	Ferrari 488 GT3	188	+23 laps
20	GTD	63	(United States) Scuderia Corsa	(United States) Cooper MacNeil (Finland) Toni Vilander (United States) Jeff Westphal	Ferrari F154 3.9 L Turbo V8	188	+23 laps
21	GTD	57	(United States) Heinricher Racing w/Meyer Shank Racing	(Brazil) Bia Figueiredo (United Kingdom) Katherine Legge (Denmark) Christina Nielsen	Acura NSX GT3	188	+23 laps
21	GTD	57	(United States) Heinricher Racing w/Meyer Shank Racing	(Brazil) Bia Figueiredo (United Kingdom) Katherine Legge (Denmark) Christina Nielsen	Acura 3.5 L Turbo V6	188	+23 laps
22	GTD	14	(Canada) AIM Vasser Sullivan	(Switzerland) Philipp Frommenwiler (United Kingdom) Jack Hawksworth (United States) Richard Heistand	Lexus RC F GT3	188	+23 laps
22	GTD	14	(Canada) AIM Vasser Sullivan	(Switzerland) Philipp Frommenwiler (United Kingdom) Jack Hawksworth (United States) Richard Heistand	Lexus 5.0 L V8	188	+23 laps
23	GTD	9	(Canada) Pfaff Motorsports	(Canada) Scott Hargrove (Canada) Zacharie Robichon	Porsche 911 GT3 R	188	+23 laps
23	GTD	9	(Canada) Pfaff Motorsports	(Canada) Scott Hargrove (Canada) Zacharie Robichon	Porsche 4.0 L Flat-6	188	+23 laps
24	GTD	44	(United States) Magnus Racing	(United States) Andy Lally (United States) John Potter (United States) Spencer Pumpelly	Lamborghini Huracán GT3 Evo	188	+23 laps
24	GTD	44	(United States) Magnus Racing	(United States) Andy Lally (United States) John Potter (United States) Spencer Pumpelly	Lamborghini 5.2 L V10	188	+23 laps
25	GTD	29	(Germany) Montaplast by Land-Motorsport	(Switzerland) Ricardo Feller (Germany) Christopher Mies (Canada) Daniel Morad	Audi R8 LMS GT3	188	+23 laps
25	GTD	29	(Germany) Montaplast by Land-Motorsport	(Switzerland) Ricardo Feller (Germany) Christopher Mies (Canada) Daniel Morad	Audi 5.2 L V10	188	+23 laps
26	GTD	12	(Canada) AIM Vasser Sullivan	(United States) Townsend Bell (United States) Frankie Montecalvo (United States) Aaron Telitz	Lexus RC F GT3	188	+23 laps
26	GTD	12	(Canada) AIM Vasser Sullivan	(United States) Townsend Bell (United States) Frankie Montecalvo (United States) Aaron Telitz	Lexus 5.0 L V8	188	+23 laps
27	GTD	540	(United States) Black Swan Racing	(United States) Marc Miller (Germany) Marco Seefried (Germany) Dirk Werner	Porsche 911 GT3 R	186	+25 laps
27	GTD	540	(United States) Black Swan Racing	(United States) Marc Miller (Germany) Marco Seefried (Germany) Dirk Werner	Porsche 4.0 L Flat-6	186	+25 laps
28	GTD	47	(United States) Precision Performance Motorsports	(United States) Jacob Eidson (United States) Brandon Gdovic (United States) Don Yount	Lamborghini Huracán GT3 Evo	185	+26 laps
28	GTD	47	(United States) Precision Performance Motorsports	(United States) Jacob Eidson (United States) Brandon Gdovic (United States) Don Yount	Lamborghini 5.2 L V10	185	+26 laps
29	GTD	8	(United States) Starworks Motorsport	(United States) Parker Chase (United Kingdom) Ryan Dalziel (United States) Mike Skeen	Audi R8 LMS GT3	185	+26 laps
29	GTD	8	(United States) Starworks Motorsport	(United States) Parker Chase (United Kingdom) Ryan Dalziel (United States) Mike Skeen	Audi 5.2 L V10	185	+26 laps
30	LMP2	38	(United States) Performance Tech Motorsports	(Canada) Cameron Cassels (United States) Andrew Evans (United States) Kyle Masson	Oreca 07	181	+30 laps
30	LMP2	38	(United States) Performance Tech Motorsports	(Canada) Cameron Cassels (United States) Andrew Evans (United States) Kyle Masson	Gibson GK428 4.2 L V8	181	+30 laps
31 DNF	GTLM	25	(United States) BMW Team RLL	(United Kingdom) Tom Blomqvist (United States) Connor De Phillippi	BMW M8 GTE	159	Pit Fire
31 DNF	GTLM	25	(United States) BMW Team RLL	(United Kingdom) Tom Blomqvist (United States) Connor De Phillippi	BMW S63 4.0 L Twin-turbo V8	159	Pit Fire
32 DNF	DPi	54	(United States) CORE Autosport	(United States) Jon Bennett (United States) Colin Braun (France) Romain Dumas	Nissan DPi	111	Gearbox
32 DNF	DPi	54	(United States) CORE Autosport	(United States) Jon Bennett (United States) Colin Braun (France) Romain Dumas	Nissan VR38DETT 3.8 L Turbo V6	111	Gearbox
33 DNF	GTD	73	(United States) Park Place Motorsports	(United States) Nicholas Boulle (United States) Patrick Lindsey (United States) Patrick Long	Porsche 911 GT3 R	86	Engine
33 DNF	GTD	73	(United States) Park Place Motorsports	(United States) Nicholas Boulle (United States) Patrick Lindsey (United States) Patrick Long	Porsche 4.0 L Flat-6	86	Engine
34 DNF	GTD	48	(United States) Paul Miller Racing	(United States) Ryan Hardwick (United States) Bryan Sellers	Lamborghini Huracán GT3 Evo	68	Lost Power
34 DNF	GTD	48	(United States) Paul Miller Racing	(United States) Ryan Hardwick (United States) Bryan Sellers	Lamborghini 5.2 L V10	68	Lost Power
35 DNF	GTLM	4	(United States) Corvette Racing	(United Kingdom) Oliver Gavin (United States) Tommy Milner	Chevrolet Corvette C7.R	0	Crash
35 DNF	GTLM	4	(United States) Corvette Racing	(United Kingdom) Oliver Gavin (United States) Tommy Milner	Chevrolet LT5.5 5.5 L V8	0	Crash
36 DNF	GTD	33	(United States) Mercedes-AMG Team Riley Motorsports	(Netherlands) Jeroen Bleekemolen (Brazil) Felipe Fraga (United States) Ben Keating	Mercedes-AMG GT3	0	Crash
36 DNF	GTD	33	(United States) Mercedes-AMG Team Riley Motorsports	(Netherlands) Jeroen Bleekemolen (Brazil) Felipe Fraga (United States) Ben Keating	Mercedes-AMG M159 6.2 L V8	0	Crash
--	GTD	19	(United States) Moorespeed	(United States) Andrew Davis (United States) Will Hardeman (Spain) Alex Riberas	Audi R8 LMS GT3	--	Did not start (Note: The #19 crew of Moorespeed did not make the start due to sustaining too much damage in an accident in free practice.)
--	GTD	19	(United States) Moorespeed	(United States) Andrew Davis (United States) Will Hardeman (Spain) Alex Riberas	Audi 5.2 L V10	--	Did not start

== Standings after the race ==
DPi Drivers' Championship standings
Pos.	+/–	Driver	Points
1	1	(United States) Dane Cameron (Colombia) Juan Pablo Montoya	177
2	1	(Brazil) Pipo Derani (Brazil) Felipe Nasr	176
3		(Brazil) Hélio Castroneves (United States) Ricky Taylor	172
4	1	(United States) Jordan Taylor (Netherlands) Renger van der Zande	163
5	1	(Portugal) Filipe Albuquerque (Portugal) João Barbosa	162

LMP2 Drivers' Championship standings
Pos.	+/–	Driver	Points
1		(Canada) Cameron Cassels (United States) Kyle Masson	131
2		(United States) Matt McMurry	130
3		(France) Gabriel Aubry	95
4	2	(United States) Eric Lux	70
5		(United States) Andrew Evans	67

GTLM Drivers' Championship standings
Pos.	+/–	Driver	Points
1	2	(France) Patrick Pilet (United Kingdom) Nick Tandy	152
2	1	(New Zealand) Earl Bamber (Belgium) Laurens Vanthoor	151
3	1	(Spain) Antonio García (Denmark) Jan Magnussen	151
4	1	(Germany) Dirk Müller	136
5	1	(United States) Connor De Phillippi	135

GTD Drivers' Championship standings
Pos.	+/–	Driver	Points
1		(Germany) Mario Farnbacher (United States) Trent Hindman	119
2	1	(United States) Richard Heistand (United Kingdom) Jack Hawksworth	103
3	1	(United States) Frankie Montecalvo (United States) Townsend Bell	102
4	1	(United States) Andy Lally (United States) John Potter	100
5	1	(United States) Patrick Long	95

- Note: Only the top five positions are included for all sets of standings.

DPi Teams' Championship standings
Pos.	+/–	Team	Points
1	1	(United States) #6 Acura Team Penske	177
2	1	(United States) #31 Whelen Engineering Racing	176
3		(United States) #7 Acura Team Penske	172
4	1	(United States) #10 Konica Minolta Cadillac	163
5	1	(United States) #5 Mustang Sampling Racing	162

LMP2 Teams' Championship standings
Pos.	+/–	Team	Points
1		(United States) #38 Performance Tech Motorsports	131
2		(United States) #52 PR1/Mathiasen Motorsports	130
3		(United States) #18 DragonSpeed	35
4		(United States) #81 DragonSpeed	30

GTLM Teams' Championship standings
Pos.	+/–	Team	Points
1	2	(United States) #911 Porsche GT Team	152
2	1	(United States) #912 Porsche GT Team	151
3	1	(United States) #3 Corvette Racing	151
4	1	(United States) #66 Ford Chip Ganassi Racing	136
5	1	(United States) #25 BMW Team RLL	135

GTD Teams' Championship standings
Pos.	+/–	Team	Points
1		(United States) #86 Meyer-Shank Racing with Curb Agajanian	119
2	1	(Canada) #14 AIM Vasser Sullivan	103
3	1	(Canada) #12 AIM Vasser Sullivan	102
4	1	(United States) #44 Magnus Racing	100
5	1	(United States) #73 Park Place Motorsports	95

- Note: Only the top five positions are included for all sets of standings.

DPi Manufacturers' Championship standings
Pos.	+/–	Manufacturer	Points
1	1	(Japan) Acura	198
2	1	(United States) Cadillac	197
3		(Japan) Mazda	181
4		(Japan) Nissan	174

GTLM Manufacturers' Championship standings
Pos.	+/–	Manufacturer	Points
1		(Germany) Porsche	170
2	1	(United States) Chevrolet	152
3	1	(Germany) BMW	149
4		(United States) Ford	148
5		(Italy) Ferrari	32

GTD Manufacturers' Championship standings
Pos.	+/–	Manufacturer	Points
1		(Italy) Lamborghini	125
2	2	(Japan) Acura	120
3	1	(Japan) Lexus	119
4	1	(Italy) Ferrari	111
5	2	(Germany) Audi	110

- Note: Only the top five positions are included for all sets of standings.

IMSA SportsCar Championship
Previous race: 2019 Chevrolet Sports Car Classic	2019 season	Next race: 2019 Mobil 1 SportsCar Grand Prix
