= Élan DP02 =

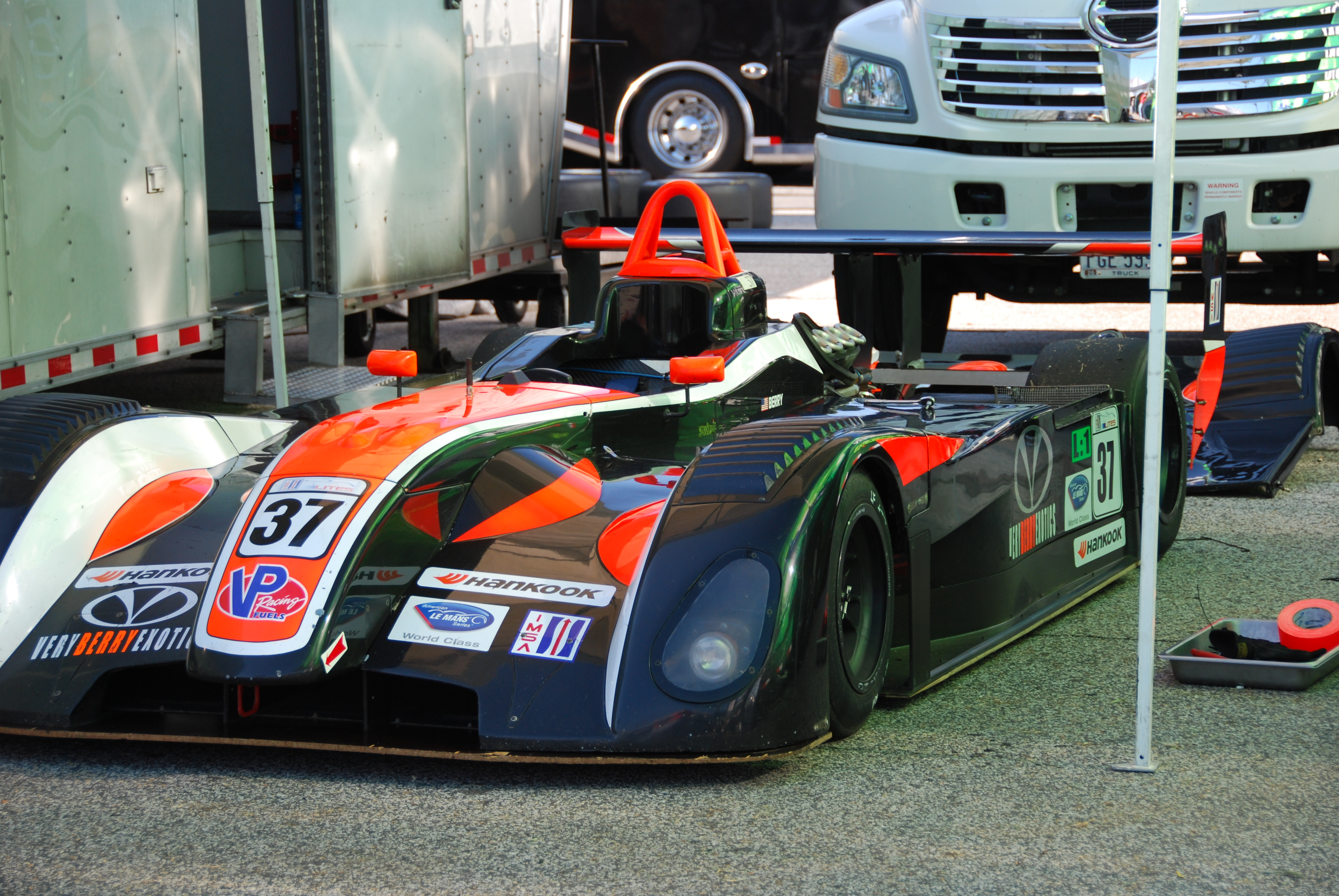

Technical specifications
- Chassis: Carbon fiber composite monocoque, fiberglass body
- Suspension (front): Double wishbone, pushrod-actuated coil springs over shock absorbers, adjustable anti-roll bars
- Length: 163.19 in (4,145 mm)
- Width: 75.2 in (1,910 mm)
- Height: 39.17 in (995 mm)
- Wheelbase: 100.59 in (2,555 mm)
- Engine: Mazda MZR/MP2/Ford Duratec 2.0–2.3 L (120–140 cu in) 16-valve DOHC I4 naturally-aspirated mid-engined
- Transmission: Hewland 6-speed sequential manual
- Power: 215–290 hp (160–216 kW) > 185 lb⋅ft (251 N⋅m) torque
- Weight: 1,175 lb (533 kg)
- Brakes: 4-pot aluminum calipers w/steel ventilated floating disc brakes

Competition history

The Élan DP02 is a sports prototype race car, designed, developed, and produced by American manufacturer Élan Motorsport, for the IMSA Prototype Challenge, between 2006 and 2012.
