= Kyle Masson =

American racing driver

- Nationality: (United States) American
- Born: August 4, 1997 (age 29) Windermere, Florida, United States
- Categorisation: FIA Silver

Kyle Masson (born August 4, 1997, in Windermere, Florida) is an American racing driver.

== Racing record ==
=== Career summary ===
Season	Series	Team	Races	Wins	Podiums	Points	Position
2014-15	Formula Skip Barber Winter Series		10	0	2	0	-
2015-16	Skip Barber Winter Series		9	5	8	350	1st
2016	Mazda Prototype Lites - L1	Performance Tech Motorsports	14	0	6	143	5th
2017	IMSA Sportscar Championship - Prototype Challenge	Performance Tech Motorsports	4	3	4	139	4th
2017	IMSA Prototype Challenge - MPC	Performance Tech Motorsports	13	11	12	259	1st
2018	IMSA Sportscar Championship - Prototype	Performance Tech Motorsports	6	0	0	112	21st
2018	IMSA Prototype Challenge - MPC	Performance Tech Motorsports	3	0	0	68	12th
2019	IMSA Sportscar Championship - LMP2	Performance Tech Motorsports	7	1	5	227	3rd
2019	IMSA Prototype Challenge - LMP3	Performance Tech Motorsports	5	0	1	101	12th

== Motorsports career results ==
=== WeatherTech SportsCar Championship results ===
(key)(Races in bold indicate pole position. Races in italics indicate fastest race lap in class. Results are overall/class)

Year	Entrant	Class	Chassis	Engine	1	2	3	4	5	6	7	8	9	10	Rank	Points
2017	Performance Tech Motorsports	PC	Oreca FLM09	LS3 6.2 L V8	DAY; 1	SEB; 1	COA	DET	WAT; 1	MOS	ELK	PET; 3			4th	139
2018	Performance Tech Motorsports	P	Oreca 07	Gibson GK428 4.2 L V8	DAY; 8	SEB; 13	LBH; 14	MDO; 11	DET; 14	WGL; 14	MOS; DNS	ELK	LGA	PET; 14	21st	112
2019	Performance Tech Motorsports	LMP2	Oreca 07	Gibson GK428 4.2 L V8	DAY; 2	SEB; 1	MOH; 2	WGL; 2	MOS; 2	ELK	LGA; 2	PET; 2			3rd	227
2020	Performance Tech Motorsports	LMP2	Oreca 07	Gibson GK428 4.2 L V8	DAY; 5	SEB; 2	MOH	WGL	ROA	LGA	ATL				15th	32
