= Dirk Müller (racing driver) =

German racing driver (born 1975)

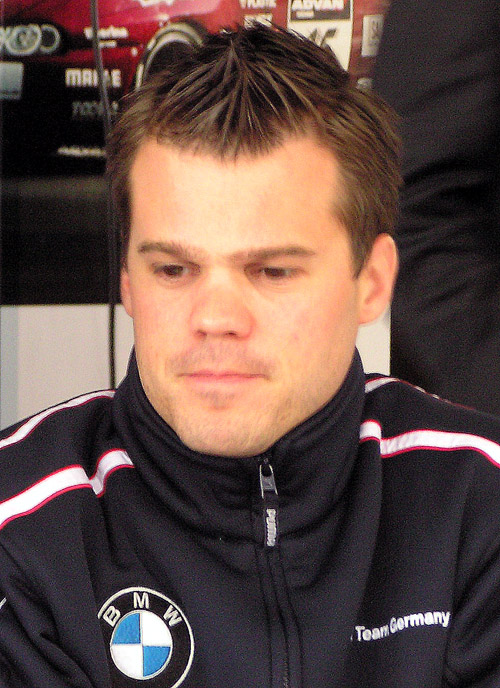
- Müller at the 2006 FIA WTCC Race of Brazil
- Nationality: (Germany) German
- Born: 18 November 1975 (age 50) Burbach, North Rhine-Westphalia, West Germany (now Germany)
- Categorisation: FIA Platinum

24 Hours of Le Mans career
- Years: 1999–2000, 2010–2011, 2016–
- Teams: Champion Racing, Dick Barbour Racing, BMW Motorsport
- Best finish: 15th (2011)
- Class wins: 1

Dirk Müller (born 18 November 1975) is a German Ford factory racing driver. He drove for Ford Chip Ganassi Racing in the 2016 IMSA WeatherTech SportsCar Championship. He won the GTE Pro class at Le Mans in 2016 and won the GTLM in 2017.

Müller's former Schnitzer BMW team-mate Jörg Müller is unrelated, as is French driver Yvan Muller.

== Biography ==
Born in Burbach, Müller won a Formula 3 race at the Nürburgring in 1996. In 1998, after a win in the GT1 class of the 24 Hours of Daytona, he scored his first title, the Porsche Carrera Cup Germany, to be followed by the ALMS GT title in 2000.

From the 2002 to 2005 season, both Dirk and Jörg were driving BMW 3 Series (E46) touring cars for the Schnitzer-operated works squad Team Deutschland in the FIA European Touring Car Championship (now WTCC). Since 2006, the team uses the new BMW 3 Series (E90) which is based on the BMW 320si limited-edition model that has a 4-cyl engine rather than the usual 6-cyl.

The 2004 24 Hours Nürburgring was won by both Müllers (and Hans-Joachim Stuck) with the BMW M3 GTR V8 that had been raced successfully in the 2001 ALMS. In 2005, the Müllers finished second behind their sister car.

After touring cars, Müller joined to Ferrari AF Corse with Toni Vilander and won the FIA GT Championship in GT2 class. In 2008, he raced in the American Le Mans Series in Ferrari F430 GTC with Dominik Farnbacher in the GT2 class.

In 2009, Müller rejoined BMW to spearhead its factory program with Rahal Letterman Racing in the American Le Mans Series. He and Joey Hand won the 2011 American Le Mans Series GT driver's championship following wins at the Twelve Hours of Sebring, Grand Prix of Long Beach and Lime Rock Park.

Müller was entered as an international driver in the 2011 Armor All Gold Coast 600 for V8 Supercars, alongside second-generation racer Steven Johnson. The German crashed out of the first race and the pairing finished 12th in the second.

For 2016, Müller joined the Ford factory program for the IMSA Weathertech SportsCar Championship as well as the 24 Hours of Le Mans. He was reunited with teammate Joey Hand, while Sébastien Bourdais joined the team for the endurance races including Le Mans.

== Racing record ==
=== 24 Hours of Le Mans results ===
Year	Team	Co-drivers	Car	Class	Laps	Pos.	Class pos.
1999	(United States) Champion Racing	(France) Bob Wollek (Germany) Bernd Mayländer	Porsche 911 GT3-R	GT	292	19th	**2nd**
2000	(United States) Dick Barbour Racing	(Germany) Lucas Luhr (France) Bob Wollek	Porsche 911 GT3-R	GT	319	**DSQ**	**DSQ**
2010	(Germany) BMW Motorsport	(United Kingdom) Andy Priaulx (Germany) Dirk Werner	BMW M3 GT2	GT2	53	DNF	DNF
2011	(Germany) BMW Motorsport	(United Kingdom) Andy Priaulx (United States) Joey Hand	BMW M3 GT2	GTE; Pro	313	15th	**3rd**
2016	(United States) Ford Chip Ganassi Team USA	(France) Sébastien Bourdais (United States) Joey Hand	Ford GT	GTE; Pro	340	18th	**1st**
2017	(United States) Ford Chip Ganassi Team USA	(United States) Joey Hand (Brazil) Tony Kanaan	Ford GT	GTE; Pro	339	22nd	6th
2018	(United States) Ford Chip Ganassi Team USA	(United States) Joey Hand (France) Sébastien Bourdais	Ford GT	GTE; Pro	343	17th	**3rd**
2019	(United States) Ford Chip Ganassi Team USA	(United States) Joey Hand (France) Sébastien Bourdais	Ford GT	GTE; Pro	342	DSQ	DSQ

=== Complete Super Tourenwagen Cup results ===
(key) (Races in bold indicate pole position) (Races in italics indicate fastest lap)

Year	Team	Car	1	2	3	4	5	6	7	8	9	10	11	12	13	14	15	16	17	18	19	20	Pos.	Pts
1997	AUGROS-MIG Austria Team	Audi A4	HOC; 1	HOC; 2	ZOL; 1	ZOL; 2	NÜR; 1	NÜR; 2	SAC; 1; 19	SAC; 2 Ret	NOR; 1; 18	NOR; 2; 21	WUN; 1 Ret	WUN; 2 DNS	ZWE; 1	ZWE; 2	SAL; 1; 23	SAL; 2; 21	REG; 1; 15	REG; 2; 16	NÜR; 1; 22	NÜR; 2 Ret	32nd	21

=== Complete European Touring Car Championship results ===
(key) (Races in bold indicate pole position) (Races in italics indicate fastest lap)

Year	Team	Car	1	2	3	4	5	6	7	8	9	10	11	12	13	14	15	16	17	18	19	20	Pos.	Pts
2002	BMW Team Deutschland	BMW 320i	MAG; 1; 3	MAG; 2; 3	SIL; 1; 5	SIL; 2; 4	BRN; 1; 2	BRN; 2; 2	JAR; 1; 4	JAR; 2; 3	AND; 1 Ret	AND; 2; 6	OSC; 1; 1	OSC; 2; 1	SPA; 1 Ret	SPA; 2 DNS	PER; 1; 3	PER; 2; 6	**DON**; **1**; 1	DON; 2; 5	EST; 1 Ret	EST; 2 DNS	4th	70
2003	BMW Team Deutschland	BMW 320i	VAL; 1; 5	VAL; 2; 1	MAG; 1; 11	MAG; 2 Ret	PER; 1; 2	PER; 2 Ret	BRN; 1; 1	BRN; 2; 3	DON; 1; 3	DON; 2; 16	SPA; 1; 2	SPA; 2; 3	AND; 1; 3	AND; 2 Ret	OSC; 1; 9	OSC; 2 Ret	EST; 1; 13	EST; 2; 7	MNZ; 1 Ret	MNZ; 2 DNS	5th	66
2004	BMW Team Deutschland	BMW 320i	MNZ; 1; 3	MNZ; 2; 3	VAL; 1; 5	VAL; 2; 4	MAG; 1; 1	MAG; 2; 6	HOC; 1; 2	HOC; 2; 3	BRN; 1; 4	BRN; 2; 1	DON; 1; 9	DON; 2; 4	SPA; 1; 1	SPA; 2; 2	IMO; 1; 8	**IMO**; **2**; 3	OSC; 1; 3	OSC; 2; 2	DUB; 1; 17†	DUB; 2; 5	2nd	111

† — Did not finish the race, but was classified as he completed over 90% of the race distance.

=== Complete World Touring Car Championship results ===
(key) (Races in bold indicate pole position) (Races in italics indicate fastest lap)

Year	Team	Car	1	2	3	4	5	6	7	8	9	10	11	12	13	14	15	16	17	18	19	20	DC	Points
2005	BMW Team Deutschland	BMW 320i	**ITA**; **1**; 1	ITA; 2; 2	FRA; 1; 6	FRA; 2; 2	GBR; 1; 10	GBR; 2; 6	SMR; 1; 4	SMR; 2; 1	MEX; 1; 18	MEX; 2; 16	BEL; 1; 1	BEL; 2; 5	GER; 1; 4	GER; 2; 6	TUR; 1; 9	TUR; 2; 5	ESP; 1; 2	ESP; 2; 4	MAC; 1; 10	MAC; 2 Ret	**2nd**	**86**
2006	BMW Team Deutschland	BMW 320si	ITA; 1; 4	ITA; 2 Ret	FRA; 1; 1	FRA; 2 DNS	GBR; 1; 9	GBR; 2; 6	GER; 1; 2	GER; 2; 3	BRA; 1; 20	BRA; 2; 15	MEX; 1; 6	MEX; 2; 4	CZE; 1; 9	CZE; 2; 5	TUR; 1; 4	TUR; 2; 7	ESP; 1; 11	ESP; 2; 7	MAC; 1; 14	MAC; 2; 8	6th	54

=== Complete IMSA SportsCar Championship results ===
(key) (Races in bold indicate pole position; results in italics indicate fastest lap)

Year	Team	Class	Make	Engine	1	2	3	4	5	6	7	8	9	10	11	12	Pos.	Points
2016	Ford Chip Ganassi Racing	GTLM	Ford GT	Ford 3.5 L EcoBoost V6	DAY; 7	SEB; 8	LBH; 8	LGA; 6	WGL; 2	MOS; 5	LIM; 5	ELK; 9	VIR; 2	COA; 6	PET; 2		6th	301
2017	Chip Ganassi Racing	GTLM	Ford GT	Ford 3.5 L EcoBoost V6	**DAY**; **1**	SEB; 2	LBH; 8	COA; 5	**WGL**; **4**	MOS; 5	LIM; 7	ELK; 1	VIR; **5**	LGA; 6	PET; 7		3rd	306
2018	Chip Ganassi Racing	GTLM	Ford GT	Ford 3.5 L EcoBoost V6	DAY; 2	SEB; 9	**LBH**; 3	MDO; 4	WGL; 1	MOS; 5	LIM; 1	ELK; 7	VIR; 4	LGA; 7	PET; 7		4th	308
2019	Chip Ganassi Racing	GTLM	Ford GT	Ford 3.5 L EcoBoost V6	DAY; 7	SEB; 2	LBH; 4	MDO; 7	WGL; 4	MOS; 6	LIM; 3	ELK; 2	VIR; 6	LGA; 1	PET; 8		5th	306
2022	Proton USA	GTD Pro	Mercedes-AMG GT3 Evo	Mercedes-AMG M159 6.2 L V8	DAY; 5	SEB	LBH										27th	290
2022	Team Korthoff Motorsports	GTD	Mercedes-AMG GT3 Evo	Mercedes-AMG M159 6.2 L V8				LGA; 5	MDO	DET	**WGL**; 10	MOS	LIM	ELK	VIR	PET; 5	30th	803
2024	Ford Multimatic Motorsports	GTD Pro	Ford Mustang GT3	Ford Coyote 5.4 L V8	DAY; 9	SEB; 8	LGA; 8	DET; 7	WGL; 10	MOS; 7	ELK; 8	VIR; 4	IMS; 12	PET; 6			10th	2555

Sporting positions
Preceded by Wolfgang Land	Porsche Carrera Cup Germany champion 1998	Succeeded by Lucas Luhr
