= 2018 6 Hours of The Glen =

Motorsport endurance race

Track Map of Watkins Glen International.

The 2018 Sahlen's Six Hours of the Glen was an endurance race sanctioned by the International Motor Sports Association (IMSA). The race was held at Watkins Glen International in Watkins Glen, New York, on July 1, 2018. The race was the sixth round of the 2018 IMSA SportsCar Championship, as well as the third round of the 2018 Patron North American Endurance Cup.

== Background ==
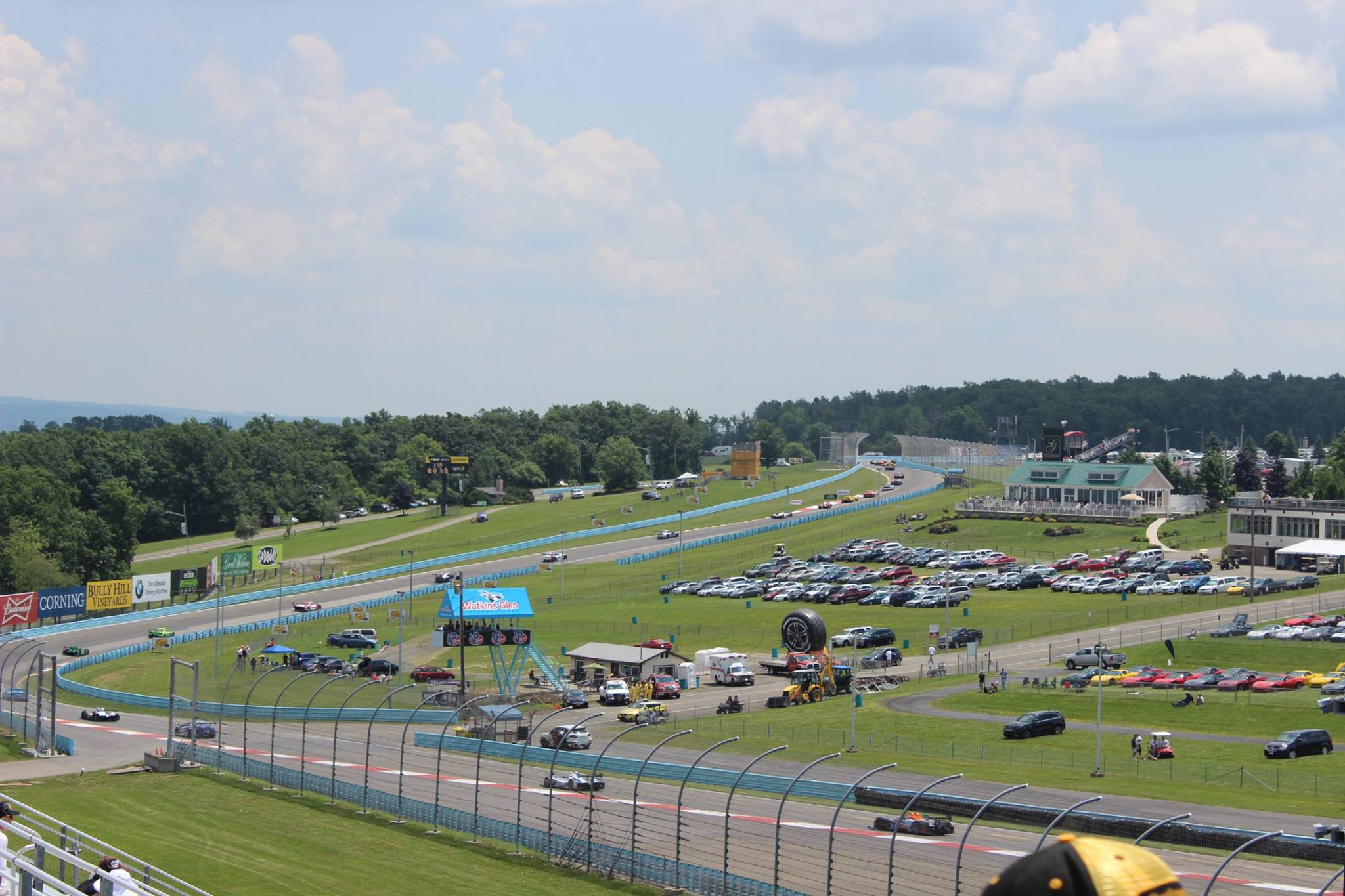
Watkins Glen International, where the race was held.

International Motor Sports Association's (IMSA) president Scott Atherton confirmed the race was part of the schedule for the 2018 IMSA SportsCar Championship (IMSA SCC) in August 2017. It was the fifth consecutive year the event was held as part of the WeatherTech SportsCar Championship. The 2018 Sahlen's 6 Hours of the Glen was the sixth of twelve scheduled sports car races of 2018 by IMSA, and was the third round of the Patron North American Endurance Cup. The race was held at the eleven-turn 3.450 mi (5.552 km) Watkins Glen International on July 1, 2018.

After the Chevrolet Sports Car Classic 4 weeks earlier, Filipe Albuquerque and João Barbosa led the Prototype Drivers' Championship with 144 points, ahead of Eric Curran and Felipe Nasr who were tied with them on 144 points, and Hélio Castroneves and Ricky Taylor with 130 points. With 121 points, the GTLM Drivers' Championship was led by Ryan Briscoe and Richard Westbrook with a seven-point advantage over Earl Bamber and Laurens Vanthoor. In GTD, the Drivers' Championship was led by Bryan Sellers and Madison Snow with 125 points ahead of Katherine Legge with 122 points.

IMSA released two separate technical bulletins regarding the Balance of Performance for the six-hour race. The first one was released on May 25, 2018, for the GT Le Mans (GTLM) class. This was done to allow IMSA teams who were preparing for the 24 Hours of Le Mans in three weeks time, notably Corvette Racing and Chip Ganassi Racing, to have the beforehand knowledge of the Balance of Performance for the race so they could prepare better. In this Bulletin, the BMW M8 GTE received a reduction of turbo boost, as well as a 4-liter fuel capacity reduction. The second technical bulletin was released on June 21, 2018, which regarded the Balance of Performance in the Prototype (P) and GT Daytona (GTD) classes for the event. In P, The Acura ARX-05 and Cadillac DPi-V.R received fuel capacity reductions of 2 liters. In GTD, Acura NSX GT3 received a 10 kilogram weight increase while the BMW M6 GT3 received a fuel capacity of reduction 2 liters.

== Entries ==
A total of 42 cars took part in the event split across 3 classes. 16 cars were entered in P, 8 in GTLM, and 18 in GTD. In P, United Autosports made their first appearance since Sebring. Performance Tech Motorsports returned after skipping the Belle Isle round.Gabby Chaves subbed for João Barbosa, who was injured, in the Mustang Sampling Racing #5. Will Owen joined Sebastián Saavedra and Gustavo Yacamán in the AFS/PR1 Mathiasen Motorsports entry. In GTLM, Tom Blomqvist joined John Edwards and Jesse Krohn in the BMW Team RLL #24 entry. Bill Auberlen returned to the BMW Team RLL #25 entry after contesting the 2 previous rounds in GTD with Turner Motorsport. In GTD, HART, Montaplast by Land-Motorsport, CJ Wilson Racing, P1 Motorsports, and Squadra Corse Garage Italia made their first appearances since Sebring. Scuderia Corsa added a second entry while Wright Motorsports scaled down to one entry. Daniel Morad substituted for in the Adam Christodoulou P1 Motorsports entry due to visa issues. Oswaldo Negri Jr. joined Francesco Piovanetti and Daniel Serra in the Squadra Corse Garage Italia entry. Markus Palttala, Don Yount, and Dillon Machavern returned to the Turner Motorsport entry for the first time since Sebring. Mario Farnbacher joined David Heinemeier Hansson and Jack Hawksworth in the #15 3GT Racing entry.

== Practice ==
There were three practice sessions preceding the start of the race on Saturday, two on Friday and one on Saturday. The first two one-hour sessions were on Friday morning and afternoon. The third on Saturday morning lasted an hour.

=== Practice 1 ===
The first practice session took place at 10:25 am ET on Friday and ended with Dane Cameron topping the charts for Acura Team Penske, with a lap time of 1:33.562.

Pos.	Class	No.	Team	Driver	Time	Gap
1	P	6	Acura Team Penske	Dane Cameron	1:33.562	_
2	P	10	Wayne Taylor Racing	Jordan Taylor	1:34.476	+0.914
3	P	54	CORE Autosport	Romain Dumas	1:34.490	+0.928

=== Practice 2 ===
The second practice session took place at 2:50 pm ET on Friday and ended with Romain Dumas topping the charts for CORE Autosport, with a lap time of 1:33.481.

Pos.	Class	No.	Team	Driver	Time	Gap
1	P	54	CORE Autosport	Romain Dumas	1:33.481	_
2	P	10	Wayne Taylor Racing	Renger van der Zande	1:33.757	+0.276
3	P	6	Acura Team Penske	Juan Pablo Montoya	1:33.827	+0.346

=== Practice 3 ===
The third and final practice session took place at 8:00 am ET on Saturday and ended with Dane Cameron topping the charts for Acura Team Penske, with a lap time of 1:32.975.

Pos.	Class	No.	Team	Driver	Time	Gap
1	P	6	Acura Team Penske	Dane Cameron	1:32.975	_
2	P	85	JDC-Miller MotorSports	Simon Trummer	1:33.137	+0.162
3	P	54	CORE Autosport	Colin Braun	1:33.174	+0.199

== Qualifying ==
Saturday afternoon's 65-minute qualifying session was divided into three groups. All three categories had 15-minute individual sessions, and regulations stipulated teams to nominate a single driver to qualify their cars. The competitors' fastest lap times determined the starting order with the grid arranged to put the Prototype and GTLM cars ahead of all GTD entries.

=== Qualifying results ===
Pole positions in each class are indicated in bold and by ‡.

Pos.	Class	No.	Team	Driver	Time	Gap	Grid
1	P	54	(United States) CORE Autosport	(United States) Colin Braun	1:32.350	**_**	16^{1}
2	**P**	**32**	**(United States) United Autosports**	**(United Kingdom) Paul di Resta**	**1:32.356**	**+0.006**	1‡
3	P	7	(United States) Acura Team Penske	(United States) Ricky Taylor	1:32.638	+0.288	2
4	P	6	(United States) Acura Team Penske	(United States) Dane Cameron	1:32.782	+0.432	3
5	P	85	(United States) JDC-Miller MotorSports	(Switzerland) Simon Trummer	1:33.016	+0.666	4
6	P	22	(United States) Tequila Patrón ESM	(Brazil) Pipo Derani	1:33.092	+0.742	15^{2}
7	P	52	(United States) AFS/PR1 Mathiasen Motorsports	(Colombia) Gustavo Yacamán	1:33.447	+1.097	5
8	P	10	(United States) Wayne Taylor Racing	(Netherlands) Renger van der Zande	1:33.528	+1.178	6
9	P	99	(United States) JDC-Miller MotorSports	(South Africa) Stephen Simpson	1:33.574	+1.224	7
10	P	38	(United States) Performance Tech Motorsports	(United States) James French	1:33.624	+1.274	8
11	P	31	(United States) Whelen Engineering Racing	(Brazil) Felipe Nasr	1:33.716	+1.366	9
12	P	90	(United States) Spirit of Daytona Racing	(France) Tristan Vautier	1:33.761	+1.411	10
13	P	55	(Germany) Mazda Team Joest	(United Kingdom) Harry Tincknell	1:33.902	+1.552	11
14	P	5	(United States) Mustang Sampling Racing	(Portugal) Filipe Albuquerque	1:33.971	+1.621	12
15	P	2	(United States) Tequila Patrón ESM	(United States) Scott Sharp	1:34.526	+2.176	13
16	**GTLM**	**67**	**(United States) Ford Chip Ganassi Racing**	**(United Kingdom) Richard Westbrook**	**1:41.948**	**+9.598**	17‡
17	GTLM	66	(United States) Ford Chip Ganassi Racing	(United States) Joey Hand	1:42.059	+9.709	18
18	GTLM	4	(United States) Corvette Racing	(United States) Tommy Milner	1:42.365	+10.015	19
19	GTLM	3	(United States) Corvette Racing	(Spain) Antonio García	1:42.497	+10.147	20
20	GTLM	912	(United States) Porsche GT Team	(New Zealand) Earl Bamber	1:42.507	+10.157	21
21	GTLM	911	(United States) Porsche GT Team	(France) Patrick Pilet	1:42.615	+10.265	22
22	GTLM	24	(United States) BMW Team RLL	(United Kingdom) Tom Blomqvist	1:43.277	+10.927	23
23	GTLM	25	(United States) BMW Team RLL	(United States) Connor De Phillippi	1:43.539	+11.189	24
24	**GTD**	**15**	**(United States) 3GT Racing**	**(United Kingdom) Jack Hawksworth**	**1:44.499**	**+12.149**	25‡
25	GTD	29	(Germany) Montaplast by Land-Motorsport	(Germany) Christopher Mies	1:44.611	+12.261	25
26	GTD	14	(United States) 3GT Racing	(Canada) Kyle Marcelli	1:44.712	+12.362	26
27	GTD	86	(United States) Meyer Shank Racing with Curb-Agajanin	(Portugal) Álvaro Parente	1:44.742	+12.392	27
28	GTD	93	(United States) Meyer Shank Racing with Curb-Agajanin	(United States) Lawson Aschenbach	1:44.778	+12.428	28
29	GTD	63	(United States) Scuderia Corsa	(United States) Jeff Segal	1:44.812	+12.462	29
30	GTD	48	(United States) Paul Miller Racing	(United States) Madison Snow	1:45.429	+13.079	30
31	GTD	58	(United States) Wright Motorsports	(United States) Patrick Long	1:45.429	+13.079	31
32	GTD	71	(United States) P1 Motorsports	(Canada) Daniel Morad	1:45.724	+13.374	42^{3}
33	GTD	75	(United States) SunEnergy1 Racing	(Australia) Kenny Habul	1:45.802	+13.452	33
34	GTD	33	(United States) Mercedes-AMG Team Riley Motorsport	(United States) Ben Keating	1:45.803	+13.453	34
35	GTD	69	(United States) HART	(United States) Tom Dyer	1:45.891	+13.541	35
36	GTD	96	(United States) Turner Motorsport	(United States) Don Yount	1:46.966	+14.616	36
37	GTD	44	(United States) Magnus Racing	(United States) John Potter	1:47.076	+14.726	37
38	GTD	64	(United States) Scuderia Corsa	(United States) Bill Sweedler	1:47.360	+15.010	38
39	GTD	51	(Italy) Squadra Corse Garage Italia	(United States) Francesco Piovanetti	1:47.481	+15.131	39
40	GTD	36	(United States) CJ Wilson Racing	(United Kingdom) Till Bechtolsheimer	1:48.165	+15.815	40
41	GTD	73	(United States) Park Place Motorsports	did not participate			41^{4}
42	GTD	77	(Germany) Mazda Team Joest	did not participate			14^{5}
Sources:

- ^{1} The No. 54 CORE Autosport entry was moved to the back of the P field for starting the race with a different driver than who qualified.
- ^{2} The No. 22 Tequila Patrón ESM entry initially qualified sixth for the P class. However, the team changed engines after qualifying. By IMSA rules, the entry was moved to the rear of the P field on the starting grid.
- ^{3} The No. 71 P1 Motorsports entry was moved to the back of the GTD field for starting the race with a different driver than who qualified.
- ^{4} The No. 73 Park Place Motorsports moved to the back of the GTD field for failing to submit a starting driver for the race.
- ^{5} The No. 77 Mazda Team Joest entry moved to the back of the P field for failing to submit a starting driver for the race.

== Race ==
=== Post-race ===
The result kept Albuquerque atop the Prototype Drivers' Championship with 169 points, 1 point ahead of seventh-place finishers Curran and Nasr. Cameron and Montoya advanced from fifth to third while Goikhberg and Simpson moved from eighth to fifth. As a result of winning the race, Hand and Müller took the lead of the GTLM Drivers' Championship. García and Magnussen advanced from fifth to third while Pilet and Tandy moved from seventh to fifth. Bamber and Vanthoor dropped from second to fourth. The result kept Sellers and Snow atop the GTD Drivers' Championship with 155 points, 1 point ahead of Legge. Cadillac and Lamborghini continued to top their respective Manufacturers' Championships while Ford to the lead of the GTLM Manufactures' Championship. Mustang Sampling Racing, and Paul Miller Racing kept their respective advantages in the Teams' Championships while the #66 Ford Chip Ganassi Racing entry took the lead of the GTLM Teams' Championship with six rounds remaining.

=== Results ===
Class winners are denoted in bold and ‡.

Final race classification
Pos	Class	No.	Team	Drivers	Chassis	Tire	Laps	Time/Retired
Pos	Class	No.	Team	Drivers	Engine	Tire	Laps	Time/Retired
1	**P**	**99**	**(United States) JDC-Miller MotorSports**	**(Canada) Misha Goikhberg (South Africa) Stephen Simpson (United States) Chris Miller**	**Oreca 07**	C	**202**	**6:00:26.867‡**
1	**P**	**99**	**(United States) JDC-Miller MotorSports**	**(Canada) Misha Goikhberg (South Africa) Stephen Simpson (United States) Chris Miller**	**Gibson** **GK428 4.2 L V8**	C	**202**	**6:00:26.867‡**
2	P	54	(United States) CORE Autosport	(United States) Jon Bennett (United States) Colin Braun (France) Romain Dumas	Oreca 07	C	202	+1.954
2	P	54	(United States) CORE Autosport	(United States) Jon Bennett (United States) Colin Braun (France) Romain Dumas	Gibson GK428 4.2 L V8	C	202	+1.954
3	P	6	(United States) Acura Team Penske	(United States) Dane Cameron (Colombia) Juan Pablo Montoya	Acura ARX-05	C	202	+2.096
3	P	6	(United States) Acura Team Penske	(United States) Dane Cameron (Colombia) Juan Pablo Montoya	Acura AR35TT 3.5 L Turbo V6	C	202	+2.096
4	P	32	(United States) United Autosports	(United Kingdom) Paul di Resta (Brazil) Bruno Senna (United Kingdom) Phil Hanson	Ligier JS P217	C	202	+9.283
4	P	32	(United States) United Autosports	(United Kingdom) Paul di Resta (Brazil) Bruno Senna (United Kingdom) Phil Hanson	Gibson GK428 4.2 L V8	C	202	+9.283
5	P	10	(United States) Wayne Taylor Racing	(United States) Jordan Taylor (Netherlands) Renger van der Zande	Cadillac DPi-V.R	C	202	+12.158
5	P	10	(United States) Wayne Taylor Racing	(United States) Jordan Taylor (Netherlands) Renger van der Zande	Cadillac 5.5 L V8	C	202	+12.158
6	P	5	(United States) Mustang Sampling Racing	(Portugal) Filipe Albuquerque (Colombia) Gabby Chaves (Brazil) Christian Fittipaldi	Cadillac DPi-V.R	C	202	+12.617
6	P	5	(United States) Mustang Sampling Racing	(Portugal) Filipe Albuquerque (Colombia) Gabby Chaves (Brazil) Christian Fittipaldi	Cadillac 5.5 L V8	C	202	+12.617
7	P	31	(United States) Whelen Engineering Racing	(Brazil) Felipe Nasr (United States) Eric Curran (United Kingdom) Mike Conway	Cadillac DPi-V.R	C	202	+18.727
7	P	31	(United States) Whelen Engineering Racing	(Brazil) Felipe Nasr (United States) Eric Curran (United Kingdom) Mike Conway	Cadillac 5.5 L V8	C	202	+18.727
8	P	52	(United States) AFS/PR1 Mathiasen Motorsports	(Colombia) Sebastián Saavedra (Colombia) Gustavo Yacamán (United Kingdom) Will Owen	Ligier JS P217	C	202	+20.655
8	P	52	(United States) AFS/PR1 Mathiasen Motorsports	(Colombia) Sebastián Saavedra (Colombia) Gustavo Yacamán (United Kingdom) Will Owen	Gibson GK428 4.2 L V8	C	202	+20.655
9	P	85	(United States) JDC-Miller MotorSports	(United States) Robert Alon (Switzerland) Simon Trummer (France) Nelson Panciatici	Oreca 07	C	202	+1:00.247
9	P	85	(United States) JDC-Miller MotorSports	(United States) Robert Alon (Switzerland) Simon Trummer (France) Nelson Panciatici	Gibson GK428 4.2 L V8	C	202	+1:00.247
10	P	55	(Germany) Mazda Team Joest	(United States) Jonathan Bomarito (United Kingdom) Harry Tincknell (United States) Spencer Pigot	Mazda RT24-P	C	202	+1:13.100
10	P	55	(Germany) Mazda Team Joest	(United States) Jonathan Bomarito (United Kingdom) Harry Tincknell (United States) Spencer Pigot	Mazda MZ-2.0T 2.0L Turbo I4	C	202	+1:13.100
11	P	90	(United States) Spirit of Daytona Racing	(United States) Matt McMurry (France) Tristan Vautier	Cadillac DPi-V.R	C	198	+4 Laps
11	P	90	(United States) Spirit of Daytona Racing	(United States) Matt McMurry (France) Tristan Vautier	Cadillac 5.5 L V8	C	198	+4 Laps
12	P	7	(United States) Acura Team Penske	(Brazil) Hélio Castroneves (United States) Ricky Taylor	Acura ARX-05	C	198	+4 Laps
12	P	7	(United States) Acura Team Penske	(Brazil) Hélio Castroneves (United States) Ricky Taylor	Acura AR35TT 3.5 L Turbo V6	C	198	+4 Laps
13	**GTLM**	**66**	**(United States) Ford Chip Ganassi Racing**	**(United States) Joey Hand (Germany) Dirk Müller**	**Ford GT**	MI	**190**	**+14 Laps‡**
13	**GTLM**	**66**	**(United States) Ford Chip Ganassi Racing**	**(United States) Joey Hand (Germany) Dirk Müller**	**Ford EcoBoost 3.5 L Turbo V6**	MI	**190**	**+14 Laps‡**
14	GTLM	3	(United States) Corvette Racing	(Spain) Antonio García (Denmark) Jan Magnussen	Chevrolet Corvette C7.R	MI	190	+14 Laps
14	GTLM	3	(United States) Corvette Racing	(Spain) Antonio García (Denmark) Jan Magnussen	Chevrolet LT5.5 5.5 L V8	MI	190	+14 Laps
15	GTLM	911	(United States) Porsche GT Team	(United Kingdom) Nick Tandy (France) Patrick Pilet	Porsche 911 RSR	MI	190	+14 Laps
15	GTLM	911	(United States) Porsche GT Team	(United Kingdom) Nick Tandy (France) Patrick Pilet	Porsche 4.0 L Flat-6	MI	190	+14 Laps
16	GTLM	912	(United States) Porsche GT Team	(New Zealand) Earl Bamber (Belgium) Laurens Vanthoor	Porsche 911 RSR	MI	190	+14 Laps
16	GTLM	912	(United States) Porsche GT Team	(New Zealand) Earl Bamber (Belgium) Laurens Vanthoor	Porsche 4.0 L Flat-6	MI	190	+14 Laps
17	GTLM	4	(United States) Corvette Racing	(United Kingdom) Oliver Gavin (United States) Tommy Milner	Chevrolet Corvette C7.R	MI	190	+14 Laps
17	GTLM	4	(United States) Corvette Racing	(United Kingdom) Oliver Gavin (United States) Tommy Milner	Chevrolet LT5.5 5.5 L V8	MI	190	+14 Laps
18	GTLM	67	(United States) Ford Chip Ganassi Racing	(Australia) Ryan Briscoe (United Kingdom) Richard Westbrook	Ford GT	MI	189	+15 Laps
18	GTLM	67	(United States) Ford Chip Ganassi Racing	(Australia) Ryan Briscoe (United Kingdom) Richard Westbrook	Ford EcoBoost 3.5 L Turbo V6	MI	189	+15 Laps
19	GTLM	25	(United States) BMW Team RLL	(United States) Connor De Phillippi (United States) Bill Auberlen (United Kingdom) Alexander Sims	BMW M8 GTE	MI	189	+15 Laps
19	GTLM	25	(United States) BMW Team RLL	(United States) Connor De Phillippi (United States) Bill Auberlen (United Kingdom) Alexander Sims	BMW S63 4.0 L Turbo V8	MI	189	+15 Laps
20	**GTD**	**96**	**(United States) Turner Motorsport**	**(United States) Don Yount (United States) Dillon Machavern (Finland) Markus Palttala**	**BMW M6 GT3**	C	**186**	**+16 Laps‡**
20	**GTD**	**96**	**(United States) Turner Motorsport**	**(United States) Don Yount (United States) Dillon Machavern (Finland) Markus Palttala**	**BMW 4.4 L Turbo V8**	C	**186**	**+16 Laps‡**
21	GTD	86	(United States) Meyer Shank Racing with Curb-Agajanin	(United Kingdom) Katherine Legge (Portugal) Álvaro Parente	Acura NSX GT3	C	186	+16 Laps
21	GTD	86	(United States) Meyer Shank Racing with Curb-Agajanin	(United Kingdom) Katherine Legge (Portugal) Álvaro Parente	Acura 3.5 L Turbo V6	C	186	+16 Laps
22	GTD	48	(United States) Paul Miller Racing	(United States) Bryan Sellers (United States) Madison Snow	Lamborghini Huracán GT3	C	186	+16 Laps
22	GTD	48	(United States) Paul Miller Racing	(United States) Bryan Sellers (United States) Madison Snow	Lamborghini 5.2 L V10	C	186	+16 Laps
23	GTD	15	(United States) 3GT Racing	(Germany) Mario Farnbacher (United Kingdom) Jack Hawksworth (Denmark) David Heinemeier Hansson	Lexus RC F GT3	C	186	+16 Laps
23	GTD	15	(United States) 3GT Racing	(Germany) Mario Farnbacher (United Kingdom) Jack Hawksworth (Denmark) David Heinemeier Hansson	Lexus 5.0L V8	C	186	+16 Laps
24	GTD	33	(United States) Mercedes-AMG Team Riley Motorsport	(Netherlands) Jeroen Bleekemolen (United States) Ben Keating (Germany) Luca Stolz	Mercedes AMG GT3	C	186	+16 Laps
24	GTD	33	(United States) Mercedes-AMG Team Riley Motorsport	(Netherlands) Jeroen Bleekemolen (United States) Ben Keating (Germany) Luca Stolz	Mercedes-AMG M159 6.2 L V8	C	186	+16 Laps
25	GTD	73	(United States) Park Place Motorsports	(Germany) Jörg Bergmeister (United States) Patrick Lindsey	Porsche 911 GT3 R	C	186	+16 Laps
25	GTD	73	(United States) Park Place Motorsports	(Germany) Jörg Bergmeister (United States) Patrick Lindsey	Porsche 4.0 L Flat-6	C	186	+16 Laps
26	GTD	63	(United States) Scuderia Corsa	(United States) Jeff Segal (United States) Cooper MacNeil (United States) Gunnar Jeannette	Ferrari 488 GT3	C	186	+16 Laps
26	GTD	63	(United States) Scuderia Corsa	(United States) Jeff Segal (United States) Cooper MacNeil (United States) Gunnar Jeannette	Ferrari F154CB 3.9 L Turbo V8	C	186	+16 Laps
27	GTD	75	(United States) SunEnergy1 Racing	(Australia) Kenny Habul (Germany) Thomas Jäger (Canada) Mikaël Grenier	Mercedes AMG GT3	C	186	+16 Laps
27	GTD	75	(United States) SunEnergy1 Racing	(Australia) Kenny Habul (Germany) Thomas Jäger (Canada) Mikaël Grenier	Mercedes-AMG M159 6.2 L V8	C	186	+16 Laps
28	GTD	58	(United States) Wright Motorsports	(United States) Patrick Long (Denmark) Christina Nielsen (Germany) Robert Renauer	Porsche 911 GT3 R	C	186	+16 Laps
28	GTD	58	(United States) Wright Motorsports	(United States) Patrick Long (Denmark) Christina Nielsen (Germany) Robert Renauer	Porsche 4.0 L Flat-6	C	186	+16 Laps
29	GTD	64	(United States) Scuderia Corsa	(United States) Townsend Bell (United States) Frankie Montecalvo (United States) Bill Sweedler	Ferrari 488 GT3	C	185	+17 Laps
29	GTD	64	(United States) Scuderia Corsa	(United States) Townsend Bell (United States) Frankie Montecalvo (United States) Bill Sweedler	Ferrari F154CB 3.9 L Turbo V8	C	185	+17 Laps
30	GTD	36	(United States) CJ Wilson Racing	(United States) Marc Miller (United Kingdom) Till Bechtolsheimer	Acura NSX GT3	C	185	+17 Laps
30	GTD	36	(United States) CJ Wilson Racing	(United States) Marc Miller (United Kingdom) Till Bechtolsheimer	Acura 3.5 L Turbo V6	C	185	+17 Laps
31 (Note: The no. 29 Montaplast by Land-Motorsport entry was given a time penalty for failing to serve a stop + 60 penalty and drive-through penalty.)DNF	GTD	29	(Germany) Montaplast by Land-Motorsport	(South Africa) Sheldon van der Linde (Germany) Christopher Mies	Audi R8 LMS GT3	C	177	Parked
31DNF	GTD	29	(Germany) Montaplast by Land-Motorsport	(South Africa) Sheldon van der Linde (Germany) Christopher Mies	Audi 5.2L V10	C	177	Parked
32 DNF	P	77	(Germany) Mazda Team Joest	(United Kingdom) Oliver Jarvis (United States) Tristan Nunez (Germany) René Rast	Mazda RT24-P	C	166	Electrical
32 DNF	P	77	(Germany) Mazda Team Joest	(United Kingdom) Oliver Jarvis (United States) Tristan Nunez (Germany) René Rast	Mazda MZ-2.0T 2.0L Turbo I4	C	166	Electrical
33	GTLM	24	(United States) BMW Team RLL	(United States) John Edwards (Finland) Jesse Krohn (United Kingdom) Tom Blomqvist	BMW M8 GTE	MI	163	+39 Laps
33	GTLM	24	(United States) BMW Team RLL	(United States) John Edwards (Finland) Jesse Krohn (United Kingdom) Tom Blomqvist	BMW S63 4.0 L Turbo V8	MI	163	+39 Laps
34 DNF	P	38	(United States) Performance Tech Motorsports	(United States) James French (United States) Kyle Masson (United States) Joel Miller	Oreca 07	C	116	Crash
34 DNF	P	38	(United States) Performance Tech Motorsports	(United States) James French (United States) Kyle Masson (United States) Joel Miller	Gibson GK428 4.2 L V8	C	116	Crash
35 DNF	GTD	14	(United States) 3GT Racing	(Austria) Dominik Baumann (Canada) Kyle Marcelli	Lexus RC F GT3	C	111	Fuel Pump
35 DNF	GTD	14	(United States) 3GT Racing	(Austria) Dominik Baumann (Canada) Kyle Marcelli	Lexus 5.0L V8	C	111	Fuel Pump
36 DNF	GTD	93	(United States) Meyer Shank Racing with Curb-Agajanin	(United States) Justin Marks (United States) Lawson Aschenbach	Acura NSX GT3	C	76	Suspension
36 DNF	GTD	93	(United States) Meyer Shank Racing with Curb-Agajanin	(United States) Justin Marks (United States) Lawson Aschenbach	Acura 3.5 L Turbo V6	C	76	Suspension
37 DNF	GTD	69	(United States) HART	(United States) Ryan Eversley (United States) Chad Gilsinger (United States) Tom Dyer	Acura NSX GT3	C	76	Did Not Finish
37 DNF	GTD	69	(United States) HART	(United States) Ryan Eversley (United States) Chad Gilsinger (United States) Tom Dyer	Acura 3.5 L Turbo V6	C	76	Did Not Finish
38 DNF	GTD	71	(United States) P1 Motorsports	(Canada) Daniel Morad (Colombia) JC Perez (Italy) Loris Spinelli	Mercedes-AMG GT3	C	45	Did Not Finish
38 DNF	GTD	71	(United States) P1 Motorsports	(Canada) Daniel Morad (Colombia) JC Perez (Italy) Loris Spinelli	Mercedes-AMG M159 6.2 L V8	C	45	Did Not Finish
39 (Note: The no. 44 Magnus Racing entry was moved to the rear of the GTD classification after Andy Lally failed to meet minimum drive time.)	GTD	44	(United States) Magnus Racing	(United States) John Potter (United States) Andy Lally (United States) Andrew Davis	Audi R8 LMS GT3	C	184	+ 18 Laps
39	GTD	44	(United States) Magnus Racing	(United States) John Potter (United States) Andy Lally (United States) Andrew Davis	Audi 5.2L V10	C	184	+ 18 Laps
40 (Note: The no. 51 Squadra Corse Garage Italia entry was moved to the rear of the GTD classification after Daniel Serra failed to meet minimum drive time.)DNF	GTD	51	(Italy) Squadra Corse Garage Italia	(United States) Francesco Piovanetti (Brazil) Oswaldo Negri Jr. (Brazil) Daniel Serra	Ferrari 488 GT3	C	167	Did Not Finish
40DNF	GTD	51	(Italy) Squadra Corse Garage Italia	(United States) Francesco Piovanetti (Brazil) Oswaldo Negri Jr. (Brazil) Daniel Serra	Ferrari F154CB 3.9 L Turbo V8	C	167	Did Not Finish
41 DNF	P	2	(United States) Tequila Patrón ESM	(United Kingdom) Ryan Dalziel (United States) Scott Sharp (France) Olivier Pla	Nissan Onroak DPi	C	32	Engine
41 DNF	P	2	(United States) Tequila Patrón ESM	(United Kingdom) Ryan Dalziel (United States) Scott Sharp (France) Olivier Pla	Nissan VR38DETT 3.8 L Turbo V6	C	32	Engine
42 DNF	P	22	(United States) Tequila Patrón ESM	(Brazil) Pipo Derani (United States) Johannes van Overbeek (France) Nicolas Lapierre	Nissan Onroak DPi	C	8	Engine
42 DNF	P	22	(United States) Tequila Patrón ESM	(Brazil) Pipo Derani (United States) Johannes van Overbeek (France) Nicolas Lapierre	Nissan VR38DETT 3.8 L Turbo V6	C	8	Engine

Tyre manufacturers
Key
Symbol	Tyre manufacturer
**C**	Continental
**MI**	Michelin

== Standings after the race ==
Prototype Drivers' Championship standings
Pos.	+/–	Driver	Points
1		(Portugal) Filipe Albuquerque	169
2		(United States) Eric Curran (Brazil) Felipe Nasr	168
3	2	(United States) Dane Cameron (Colombia) Juan Pablo Montoya	156
4		(United States) Jordan Taylor (Netherlands) Renger van der Zande	156
5	3	(Canada) Misha Goikhberg (South Africa) Stephen Simpson	150

GTLM Drivers' Championship standings
Pos.	+/–	Driver	Points
1	2	(United States) Joey Hand (Germany) Dirk Müller	147
2	1	(Australia) Ryan Briscoe (United Kingdom) Richard Westbrook	146
3	2	(Spain) Antonio García (Denmark) Jan Magnussen	143
4	2	(New Zealand) Earl Bamber (Belgium) Laurens Vanthoor	142
5	2	(United Kingdom) Nick Tandy (France) Patrick Pilet	138

GTD Drivers' Championship standings
Pos.	+/–	Driver	Points
1		(United States) Bryan Sellers (United States) Madison Snow	155
2		(United Kingdom) Katherine Legge	154
3		(Netherlands) Jeroen Bleekemolen (United States) Ben Keating	134
4	1	(United States) Cooper MacNeil	126
5	1	(United Kingdom) Jack Hawksworth (Denmark) David Heinemeier Hansson	102

- Note: Only the top five positions are included for all sets of standings.

Prototype Teams' Championship standings
Pos.	+/–	Team	Points
1		(United States) No. 5 Mustang Sampling Racing	169
2		(United States) No. 31 Whelen Engineering Racing	168
3	2	(United States) No. 6 Acura Team Penske	156
4		(United States) No. 10 Wayne Taylor Racing	156
5	3	(United States) No. 99 JDC-Miller Motorsports	150

GTLM Teams' Championship standings
Pos.	+/–	Team	Points
1	1	(United States) No. 66 Ford Chip Ganassi Racing	147
2	1	(United States) No. 67 Ford Chip Ganassi Racing	146
3	2	(United States) No. 3 Corvette Racing	143
4	2	(United States) No. 912 Porsche GT Team	142
5	2	(United States) No. 911 Porsche GT Team	138

GTD Teams' Championship standings
Pos.	+/–	Team	Points
1		(United States) No. 48 Paul Miller Racing	155
2		(United States) No. 86 Meyer Shank Racing with Curb-Agajanin	154
3		(United States) No. 33 Mercedes-AMG Team Riley Motorsports	134
4	1	(United States) No. 63 Scuderia Corsa	126
5	1	(United States) No. 15 3GT Racing	123

- Note: Only the top five positions are included for all sets of standings.

Prototype Manufacturers' Championship standings
Pos.	+/–	Manufacturer	Points
1		(United States) Cadillac	199
2		(United States) Acura	190
3		(Japan) Nissan	181
4		(Japan) Mazda	180

GTLM Manufacturers' Championship standings
Pos.	+/–	Manufacturer	Points
1	1	(United States) Ford	160
2	1	(Germany) Porsche	156
3		(United States) Chevrolet	155
4		(Germany) BMW	148
5		(Italy) Ferrari	58

GTD Manufacturers' Championship standings
Pos.	+/–	Manufacturer	Points
1		(Italy) Lamborghini	162
2		(United States) Acura	155
3	2	(Japan) Lexus	140
4	1	(Germany) Mercedes-AMG	140
5	1	(Italy) Ferrari	137

- Note: Only the top five positions are included for all sets of standings.

IMSA SportsCar Championship
Previous race: Chevrolet Sports Car Classic	2018 season	Next race: SportsCar Grand Prix
