= 2018 SportsCar Grand Prix =

Sports car race

The Canadian Tire Motorsports Park

The 2018 SportsCar Grand Prix was a sports car race sanctioned by the International Motor Sports Association (IMSA). The race was held at Canadian Tire Motorsports Park in Bowmanville, Ontario, Canada, on July 8, 2018. The race was the seventh round of the 2018 IMSA SportsCar Championship.

== Background ==
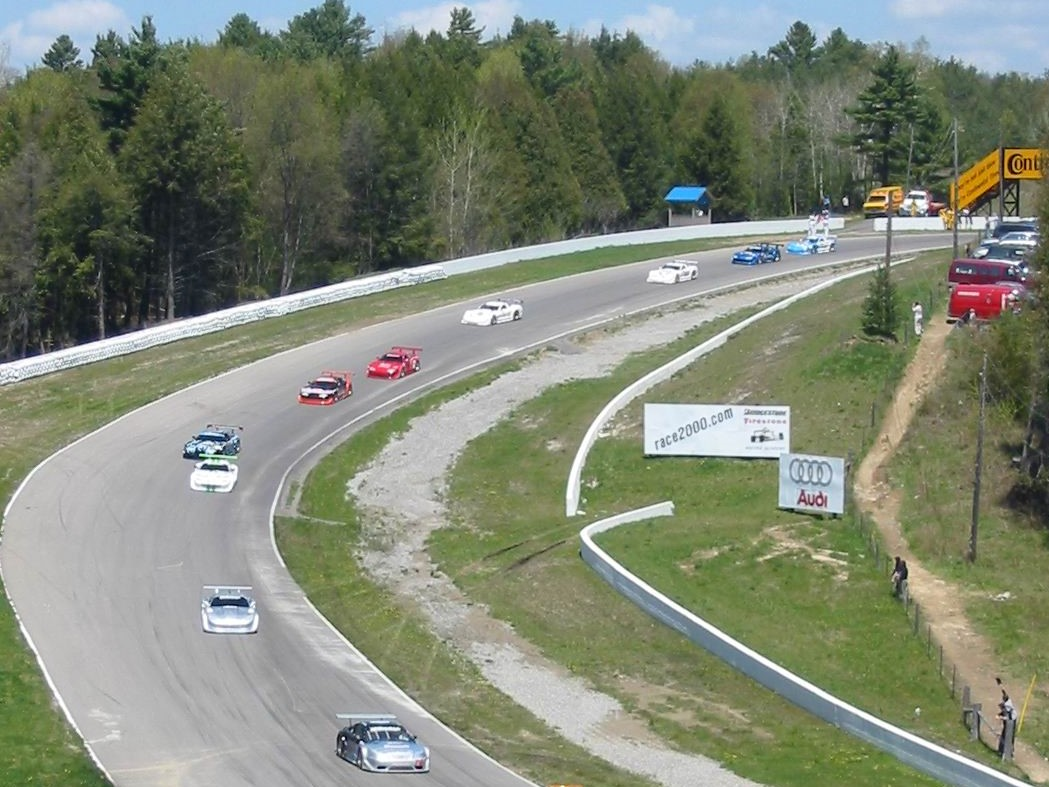
Canadian Tire Motorsports Park, where the race was held.

International Motor Sports Association's (IMSA) president Scott Atherton confirmed the race was part of the schedule for the 2018 IMSA SportsCar Championship (IMSA SCC) in August 2017. It was the fifth consecutive year the event was held as part of the WeatherTech SportsCar Championship and the thirty-sixth annual running of the race. The 2018 SportsCar Grand Prix was the seventh of twelve scheduled sports car races of 2018 by IMSA, and was the fourth round not held on the held as part of the North American Endurance Cup. The race was held at the ten-turn 2.459 mi (3.957 km) Canadian Tire Motorsports Park circuit on July 8, 2018.

After the Sahlen's Six Hours of the Glen 1 week earlier, Filipe Albuquerque led the Prototype Drivers' Championship with 169 points, ahead of Eric Curran and Felipe Nasr with 168 points, and Dane Cameron and Juan Pablo Montoya with 156 points. With 147 points, the GTLM Drivers' Championship was led by Joey Hand and Dirk Müller with a one-point advantage over Ryan Briscoe and Richard Westbrook. In GTD, the Drivers' Championship was led by Bryan Sellers and Madison Snow with 155 points ahead of Katherine Legge with 154 points.

On July 4, 2018, IMSA released the latest technical bulletin outlining Balance of performance for the event. In P, the Cadillac DPi-V.R received a 0.3 mm larger air restrictor while the Mazda RT24-P and Nissan Onroak DPi received an increase of turbo boost. Additionally, the Cadillac, Mazda, and Nissan received an increase in fuel capacity. In GTLM, the Chevrolet Corvette C7.R received a 0.9 mm larger air restrictor while the BMW M8 GTE received a reduction in turbo boost. In GTD, the Audi R8 LMS and Porsche 911 GT3 R received air restrictor increases of 1 and 3 millimeters, respectively.

== Entries ==
A total of 32 cars took part in the event split across 3 classes. 13 cars were entered in P, 8 in GTLM, and 11 in GTLM. In P, United Autosports were absent. Spirit of Daytona Racing skipped due to a lack of funding. Tequila Patrón ESM scaled down to a single entry due to a lack of spare engines following the previous round at Watkins Glen. Ryan Dalziel joined Pipo Derani in the #22 Tequila Patrón ESM entry. In GTD, CJ Wilson Racing, Squadra Corse Garage Italia, Montaplast by Land-Motorsport, HART, Park Place Motorsports, and P1 Motorsports were absent. Scuderia Corsa scaled down to a single entry while the #16 Wright Motorsports made its since appearance since Belle Isle. SunEnergy1 Racing skipped the event after ending their partnership with Riley Motorsports. Bill Auberlen and Robby Foley returned to the Turner Motorsport entry.

== Practice ==
There were three practice sessions preceding the start of the race on Saturday, two on Friday and one on Saturday. The first two 75 minute sessions were on Friday morning and afternoon. The third session on Saturday morning lasted an hour.

=== Practice 1 ===
The first practice session took place at 11:30 am ET on Friday and ended with Colin Braun topping the charts for CORE Autosport, with a lap time of 1:07.155. Kyle Masson crashed the #38 Performance Tech Motorsports Oreca in turn 1 against the tire barriers. Performance Tech Motorsports later withdrew its entry from the event.

Pos.	Class	No.	Team	Driver	Time	Gap
1	P	54	CORE Autosport	Colin Braun	1:07.155	_
2	P	6	Acura Team Penske	Dane Cameron	1:08.071	+0.916
3	P	5	Mustang Sampling Racing	Filipe Albuquerque	1:08.088	+0.933

=== Practice 2 ===
The second practice session took place at 3:50 pm ET on Friday and ended with Colin Braun topping the charts for CORE Autosport, with a lap time of 1:06.902.

Pos.	Class	No.	Team	Driver	Time	Gap
1	P	54	CORE Autosport	Colin Braun	1:06.902	_
2	P	6	Acura Team Penske	Dane Cameron	1:06.939	+0.037
3	P	7	Acura Team Penske	Hélio Castroneves	1:07.881	+0.979

=== Practice 3 ===
The third and final practice session took place at 8:30 am ET on Saturday and ended with Colin Braun topping the charts for CORE Autosport, with a lap time of 1:06.712.

Pos.	Class	No.	Team	Driver	Time	Gap
1	P	54	CORE Autosport	Colin Braun	1:06.712	_
2	P	6	Acura Team Penske	Dane Cameron	1:07.026	+0.314
3	P	31	Whelen Engineering Racing	Felipe Nasr	1:07.336	+0.624

== Qualifying ==
Saturday afternoon's 65-minute qualifying session was divided into three groups. All three categories had 15-minute individual sessions, and regulations stipulated teams to nominate a single driver to qualify their cars. The competitors' fastest lap times determined the starting order with the grid arranged to put the Prototype and GTLM cars ahead of all GTD entries.

=== Qualifying results ===
Pole positions in each class are indicated in bold and by ‡.

Pos.	Class	No.	Team	Driver	Time	Gap	Grid
1	P	54	(United States) CORE Autosport	(United States) Colin Braun	1:06.315	**_**	12^{1}
2	**P**	**6**	**(United States) Acura Team Penske**	**(United States) Dane Cameron**	**1:06.540**	**+0.225**	1‡
3	P	85	(United States) JDC-Miller MotorSports	(United States) Robert Alon	1:06.841	+0.526	2
4	P	10	(United States) Wayne Taylor Racing	(Netherlands) Renger van der Zande	1:07.093	+0.778	3
5	P	55	(Germany) Mazda Team Joest	(United States) Jonathan Bomarito	1:07.109	+0.794	4
6	P	7	(United States) Acura Team Penske	(Brazil) Hélio Castroneves	1:07.272	+0.957	5
7	P	52	(United States) AFS/PR1 Mathiasen Motorsports	(Colombia) Sebastián Saavedra	1:07.276	+0.961	6
8	P	22	(United States) Tequila Patrón ESM	(United Kingdom) Ryan Dalziel	1:07.524	+1.209	7
9	P	77	(Germany) Mazda Team Joest	(United States) Tristan Nunez	1:07.684	+1.369	8
10	P	99	(United States) JDC-Miller MotorSports	(Canada) Misha Goikhberg	1:07.827	+1.512	9
11	P	5	(United States) Mustang Sampling Racing	(Brazil) Christian Fittipaldi	1:08.009	+1.694	10
12	P	31	(United States) Whelen Engineering Racing	(United States) Eric Curran	1:08.168	+1.853	11
13	**GTLM**	**911**	**(United States) Porsche GT Team**	**(United Kingdom) Nick Tandy**	**1:13.517**	**+7.202**	13‡
14	GTLM	67	(United States) Ford Chip Ganassi Racing	(Australia) Ryan Briscoe	1:13.831	+7.516	14
15	GTLM	3	(United States) Corvette Racing	(Denmark) Jan Magnussen	1:13.934	+7.619	15
16	GTLM	912	(United States) Porsche GT Team	(Belgium) Laurens Vanthoor	1:13.955	+7.640	16
17	GTLM	4	(United States) Corvette Racing	(United Kingdom) Oliver Gavin	1:14.080	+7.765	17
18	GTLM	24	(United States) BMW Team RLL	(Finland) Jesse Krohn	1:14.100	+7.785	18
19	GTLM	25	(United States) BMW Team RLL	(United Kingdom) Alexander Sims	1:14.213	+7.898	19
20	GTLM	66	(United States) Ford Chip Ganassi Racing	(United States) Joey Hand	1:14.228	+7.913	20
21	**GTD**	**15**	**(United States) 3GT Racing**	**(United Kingdom) Jack Hawksworth**	**1:15.581**	**+9.266**	21‡
22	GTD	14	(United States) 3GT Racing	(Austria) Dominik Baumann	1:16.020	+9.705	22
23	GTD	48	(United States) Paul Miller Racing	(United States) Bryan Sellers	1:16.386	+10.071	23
24	GTD	33	(United States) Mercedes-AMG Team Riley Motorsport	(United States) Ben Keating	1:16.417	+10.102	24
25	GTD	16	(United States) Wright Motorsports	(United States) Michael Schein	1:16.545	+10.230	25
26	GTD	86	(United States) Meyer Shank Racing with Curb-Agajanin	(Portugal) Álvaro Parente	1:16.554	+10.239	26
27	GTD	96	(United States) Turner Motorsport	(United States) Robby Foley	1:16.707	+10.392	27
28	GTD	58	(United States) Wright Motorsports	(Denmark) Christina Nielsen	1:16.887	+10.572	28
29	GTD	63	(United States) Scuderia Corsa	(United States) Cooper MacNeil	1:17.027	+10.712	29
30	GTD	93	(United States) Meyer Shank Racing with Curb-Agajanin	(United States) Justin Marks	1:17.603	+11.288	30
31	GTD	44	(United States) Magnus Racing	(United States) John Potter	1:17.610	+11.295	31^{2}
32	P	38	(United States) Performance Tech Motorsports	did not participate			32
Sources:

- ^{1} The No. 54 CORE Autosport entry was moved to the back of the P field for starting the race with a different driver than who qualified.
- ^{2} The No. 44 Magnus Racing entry was moved to the back of the GTD field after the team elected to change tires after qualifying.

== Race ==
=== Post-race ===
As a result of winning the race, Bennett and Braun moved from seventh to fourth in the Prototype Divers' Championship. Curran and Nasr jumped from second to first while Cameron and Montoya dropped from third to fifth. As a result of winning the race, Briscoe and Westbrook took the lead of the GTLM Drivers' Championship. Hand and Müller dropped from first to third while Gavin and Milner jumped from sixth to fourth. The result kept Sellers and Snow atop the GTD Drivers' Championship with 183 points, 3 points ahead of Legge. Cadillac, Ford, and Lamborghini continued to top their respective Manufacturers' Championships while Paul Miller Racing kept their advantage in the GTD Teams' Championship. Whelen Engineering Racing took the lead of the Prototype Teams' Championship while the #67 Ford Chip Ganassi Racing entry took the lead of the GTLM Teams' Championship with five rounds remaining.

=== Results ===
Class winners are denoted in bold and ‡.

Final race classification
Pos	Class	No.	Team	Drivers	Chassis	Tire	Laps	Time/Retired
Pos	Class	No.	Team	Drivers	Engine	Tire	Laps	Time/Retired
1	**P**	**54**	**(United States) CORE Autosport**	**(United States) Jon Bennett (United States) Colin Braun**	**Oreca 07**	C	**116**	**2:40:32.557‡**
1	**P**	**54**	**(United States) CORE Autosport**	**(United States) Jon Bennett (United States) Colin Braun**	**Gibson GK428 4.2 L V8**	C	**116**	**2:40:32.557‡**
2	P	10	(United States) Wayne Taylor Racing	(United States) Jordan Taylor (Netherlands) Renger van der Zande	Cadillac DPi-V.R	C	116	+3.431
2	P	10	(United States) Wayne Taylor Racing	(United States) Jordan Taylor (Netherlands) Renger van der Zande	Cadillac 5.5 L V8	C	116	+3.431
3	P	31	(United States) Whelen Engineering Racing	(Brazil) Felipe Nasr (United States) Eric Curran	Cadillac DPi-V.R	C	116	+4.666
3	P	31	(United States) Whelen Engineering Racing	(Brazil) Felipe Nasr (United States) Eric Curran	Cadillac 5.5 L V8	C	116	+4.666
4	P	5	(United States) Mustang Sampling Racing	(Portugal) Filipe Albuquerque (Brazil) Christian Fittipaldi	Cadillac DPi-V.R	C	116	+6.657
4	P	5	(United States) Mustang Sampling Racing	(Portugal) Filipe Albuquerque (Brazil) Christian Fittipaldi	Cadillac 5.5 L V8	C	116	+6.657
5	P	7	(United States) Acura Team Penske	(Brazil) Hélio Castroneves (United States) Ricky Taylor	Acura ARX-05	C	116	+6.836
5	P	7	(United States) Acura Team Penske	(Brazil) Hélio Castroneves (United States) Ricky Taylor	Acura AR35TT 3.5 L Turbo V6	C	116	+6.836
6	P	77	(Germany) Mazda Team Joest	(United Kingdom) Oliver Jarvis (United States) Tristan Nunez	Mazda RT24-P	C	116	+9.453
6	P	77	(Germany) Mazda Team Joest	(United Kingdom) Oliver Jarvis (United States) Tristan Nunez	Mazda MZ-2.0T 2.0L Turbo I4	C	116	+9.453
7	P	99	(United States) JDC-Miller MotorSports	(Canada) Misha Goikhberg (South Africa) Stephen Simpson	Oreca 07	C	116	+11.194
7	P	99	(United States) JDC-Miller MotorSports	(Canada) Misha Goikhberg (South Africa) Stephen Simpson	Gibson GK428 4.2 L V8	C	116	+11.194
8	P	85	(United States) JDC-Miller MotorSports	(United States) Robert Alon (Switzerland) Simon Trummer	Oreca 07	C	116	+11.835
8	P	85	(United States) JDC-Miller MotorSports	(United States) Robert Alon (Switzerland) Simon Trummer	Gibson GK428 4.2 L V8	C	116	+11.835
9	P	52	(United States) AFS/PR1 Mathiasen Motorsports	(Colombia) Sebastián Saavedra (Colombia) Gustavo Yacamán	Ligier JS P217	C	114	+2 Laps
9	P	52	(United States) AFS/PR1 Mathiasen Motorsports	(Colombia) Sebastián Saavedra (Colombia) Gustavo Yacamán	Gibson GK428 4.2 L V8	C	114	+2 Laps
10	**GTLM**	**67**	**(United States) Ford Chip Ganassi Racing**	**(Australia) Ryan Briscoe (United Kingdom) Richard Westbrook**	**Ford GT**	MI	**112**	**+4 Laps‡**
10	**GTLM**	**67**	**(United States) Ford Chip Ganassi Racing**	**(Australia) Ryan Briscoe (United Kingdom) Richard Westbrook**	**Ford EcoBoost 3.5 L Turbo V6**	MI	**112**	**+4 Laps‡**
11	GTLM	3	(United States) Corvette Racing	(Spain) Antonio García (Denmark) Jan Magnussen	Chevrolet Corvette C7.R	MI	112	+4 Laps
11	GTLM	3	(United States) Corvette Racing	(Spain) Antonio García (Denmark) Jan Magnussen	Chevrolet LT5.5 5.5 L V8	MI	112	+4 Laps
12	GTLM	4	(United States) Corvette Racing	(United Kingdom) Oliver Gavin (United States) Tommy Milner	Chevrolet Corvette C7.R	MI	112	+4 Laps
12	GTLM	4	(United States) Corvette Racing	(United Kingdom) Oliver Gavin (United States) Tommy Milner	Chevrolet LT5.5 5.5 L V8	MI	112	+4 Laps
13	GTLM	911	(United States) Porsche GT Team	(France) Patrick Pilet (United Kingdom) Nick Tandy	Porsche 911 RSR	MI	112	+4 Laps
13	GTLM	911	(United States) Porsche GT Team	(France) Patrick Pilet (United Kingdom) Nick Tandy	Porsche 4.0 L Flat-6	MI	112	+4 Laps
14	GTLM	66	(United States) Ford Chip Ganassi Racing	(United States) Joey Hand (Germany) Dirk Müller	Ford GT	MI	112	+4 Laps
14	GTLM	66	(United States) Ford Chip Ganassi Racing	(United States) Joey Hand (Germany) Dirk Müller	Ford EcoBoost 3.5 L Turbo V6	MI	112	+4 Laps
15	GTLM	912	(United States) Porsche GT Team	(New Zealand) Earl Bamber (Belgium) Laurens Vanthoor	Porsche 911 RSR	MI	112	+4 Laps
15	GTLM	912	(United States) Porsche GT Team	(New Zealand) Earl Bamber (Belgium) Laurens Vanthoor	Porsche 4.0 L Flat-6	MI	112	+4 Laps
16	GTLM	25	(United States) BMW Team RLL	(United States) Connor De Phillippi (United Kingdom) Alexander Sims	BMW M8 GTE	MI	112	+4 Laps
16	GTLM	25	(United States) BMW Team RLL	(United States) Connor De Phillippi (United Kingdom) Alexander Sims	BMW S63 4.0 L Turbo V8	MI	112	+4 Laps
17	P	6	(United States) Acura Team Penske	(United States) Dane Cameron (Colombia) Juan Pablo Montoya	Acura ARX-05	C	111	+5 Laps
17	P	6	(United States) Acura Team Penske	(United States) Dane Cameron (Colombia) Juan Pablo Montoya	Acura AR35TT 3.5 L Turbo V6	C	111	+5 Laps
18	**GTD**	**33**	**(United States) Mercedes-AMG Team Riley Motorsport**	**(Netherlands) Jeroen Bleekemolen (United States) Ben Keating**	**Mercedes AMG GT3**	C	**107**	**+9 Laps‡**
18	**GTD**	**33**	**(United States) Mercedes-AMG Team Riley Motorsport**	**(Netherlands) Jeroen Bleekemolen (United States) Ben Keating**	**Mercedes-AMG M159 6.2 L V8**	C	**107**	**+9 Laps‡**
19	GTD	14	(United States) 3GT Racing	(Austria) Dominik Baumann (Canada) Kyle Marcelli	Lexus RC F GT3	C	107	+ 9 Laps
19	GTD	14	(United States) 3GT Racing	(Austria) Dominik Baumann (Canada) Kyle Marcelli	Lexus 5.0L V8	C	107	+ 9 Laps
20	GTD	44	(United States) Magnus Racing	(United States) John Potter (United States) Andy Lally	Audi R8 LMS GT3	C	107	+9 Laps
20	GTD	44	(United States) Magnus Racing	(United States) John Potter (United States) Andy Lally	Audi 5.2L V10	C	107	+9 Laps
21	GTD	48	(United States) Paul Miller Racing	(United States) Bryan Sellers (United States) Madison Snow	Lamborghini Huracán GT3	C	107	+9 Laps
21	GTD	48	(United States) Paul Miller Racing	(United States) Bryan Sellers (United States) Madison Snow	Lamborghini 5.2 L V10	C	107	+9 Laps
22	GTD	86	(United States) Meyer Shank Racing with Curb-Agajanin	(United Kingdom) Katherine Legge (Portugal) Álvaro Parente	Acura NSX GT3	C	107	+9 Laps
22	GTD	86	(United States) Meyer Shank Racing with Curb-Agajanin	(United Kingdom) Katherine Legge (Portugal) Álvaro Parente	Acura 3.5 L Turbo V6	C	107	+9 Laps
23	GTD	93	(United States) Meyer Shank Racing with Curb-Agajanin	(United States) Justin Marks (United States) Lawson Aschenbach	Acura NSX GT3	C	107	+9 Laps
23	GTD	93	(United States) Meyer Shank Racing with Curb-Agajanin	(United States) Justin Marks (United States) Lawson Aschenbach	Acura 3.5 L Turbo V6	C	107	+9 Laps
24	GTD	15	(United States) 3GT Racing	(United Kingdom) Jack Hawksworth (Denmark) David Heinemeier Hansson	Lexus RC F GT3	C	107	+9 Laps
24	GTD	15	(United States) 3GT Racing	(United Kingdom) Jack Hawksworth (Denmark) David Heinemeier Hansson	Lexus 5.0L V8	C	107	+9 Laps
25	P	55	(Germany) Mazda Team Joest	(United States) Jonathan Bomarito (United Kingdom) Harry Tincknell	Mazda RT24-P	C	107	Wheel Bearing
25	P	55	(Germany) Mazda Team Joest	(United States) Jonathan Bomarito (United Kingdom) Harry Tincknell	Mazda MZ-2.0T 2.0L Turbo I4	C	107	Wheel Bearing
26	GTD	63	(United States) Scuderia Corsa	(United States) Jeff Segal (United States) Cooper MacNeil	Ferrari 488 GT3	C	106	+10 Laps
26	GTD	63	(United States) Scuderia Corsa	(United States) Jeff Segal (United States) Cooper MacNeil	Ferrari F154CB 3.9 L Turbo V8	C	106	+10 Laps
27	GTD	58	(United States) Wright Motorsports	(United States) Patrick Long (Denmark) Christina Nielsen	Porsche 911 GT3 R	C	106	+10 Laps
27	GTD	58	(United States) Wright Motorsports	(United States) Patrick Long (Denmark) Christina Nielsen	Porsche 4.0 L Flat-6	C	106	+10 Laps
28 DNF	GTD	16	(United States) Wright Motorsports	(United States) Michael Schein (Germany) Wolf Henzler	Porsche 911 GT3 R	C	73	Fuel Pressure
28 DNF	GTD	16	(United States) Wright Motorsports	(United States) Michael Schein (Germany) Wolf Henzler	Porsche 4.0 L Flat-6	C	73	Fuel Pressure
29 DNF	GTD	96	(United States) Turner Motorsport	(United States) Robby Foley (United States) Bill Auberlen	BMW M6 GT3	C	63	Suspension
29 DNF	GTD	96	(United States) Turner Motorsport	(United States) Robby Foley (United States) Bill Auberlen	BMW 4.4 L Turbo V8	C	63	Suspension
30 DNF	GTLM	24	(United States) BMW Team RLL	(United States) John Edwards (Finland) Jesse Krohn	BMW M8 GTE	MI	61	Crash
30 DNF	GTLM	24	(United States) BMW Team RLL	(United States) John Edwards (Finland) Jesse Krohn	BMW S63 4.0 L Turbo V8	MI	61	Crash
31 DNF	P	22	(United States) Tequila Patrón ESM	(Brazil) Pipo Derani (United Kingdom) Ryan Dalziel	Nissan Onroak DPi	C	45	Turbo
31 DNF	P	22	(United States) Tequila Patrón ESM	(Brazil) Pipo Derani (United Kingdom) Ryan Dalziel	Nissan VR38DETT 3.8 L Turbo V6	C	45	Turbo
DW	P	38	(United States) Performance Tech Motorsports	(United States) James French (United States) Kyle Masson	Oreca 07	C	--	Withdrawn
DW	P	38	(United States) Performance Tech Motorsports	(United States) James French (United States) Kyle Masson	Gibson GK428 4.2 L V8	C	--	Withdrawn

Tyre manufacturers
Key
Symbol	Tyre manufacturer
**C**	Continental
**MI**	Michelin

== Standings after the race ==
Prototype Drivers' Championship standings
Pos.	+/–	Driver	Points
1	1	(United States) Eric Curran (Brazil) Felipe Nasr	198
2	1	(Portugal) Filipe Albuquerque	197
3	1	(United States) Jordan Taylor (Netherlands) Renger van der Zande	188
4	3	(United States) Jon Bennett (United States) Colin Braun	183
5	2	(United States) Dane Cameron (Colombia) Juan Pablo Montoya	177

GTLM Drivers' Championship standings
Pos.	+/–	Driver	Points
1	1	(Australia) Ryan Briscoe (United Kingdom) Richard Westbrook	181
2	1	(Spain) Antonio García (Denmark) Jan Magnussen	175
3	2	(United States) Joey Hand (Germany) Dirk Müller	173
4	2	(United Kingdom) Oliver Gavin (United States) Tommy Milner	167
5	1	(New Zealand) Earl Bamber (Belgium) Laurens Vanthoor	167

GTD Drivers' Championship standings
Pos.	+/–	Driver	Points
1		(United States) Bryan Sellers (United States) Madison Snow	183
2		(United Kingdom) Katherine Legge	180
3		(Netherlands) Jeroen Bleekemolen (United States) Ben Keating	169
4		(United States) Cooper MacNeil	149
5		(United Kingdom) Jack Hawksworth (Denmark) David Heinemeier Hansson	147

- Note: Only the top five positions are included for all sets of standings.

Prototype Teams' Championship standings
Pos.	+/–	Team	Points
1	1	(United States) No. 31 Whelen Engineering Racing	198
2	1	(United States) No. 5 Mustang Sampling Racing	197
3	3	(United States) No. 10 Wayne Taylor Racing	188
4	3	(United States) No. 54 CORE Autosport	183
5	2	(United States) No. 6 Acura Team Penske	177

GTLM Teams' Championship standing
Pos.	+/–	Team	Points
1	1	(United States) No. 67 Ford Chip Ganassi Racing	181
2	1	(United States) No. 3 Corvette Racing	175
3	2	(United States) No. 66 Ford Chip Ganassi Racing	173
4	2	(United States) No. 4 Corvette Racing	167
5	1	(United States) No. 912 Porsche GT Team	167

GTD Teams' Championship standings
Pos.	+/–	Team	Points
1		(United States) No. 48 Paul Miller Racing	183
2		(United States) No. 86 Meyer Shank Racing with Curb-Agajanin	180
3		(United States) No. 33 Mercedes-AMG Team Riley Motorsports	169
4		(United States) No. 63 Scuderia Corsa	149
5		(United States) No. 15 3GT Racing	147

- Note: Only the top five positions are included for all sets of standings.

Prototype Manufacturers' Championship standings
Pos.	+/–	Manufacturer	Points
1		(United States) Cadillac	234
2		(United States) Acura	222
3	1	(Japan) Mazda	210
4	1	(Japan) Nissan	209

GTLM Manufacturers' Championship standings
Pos.	+/–	Manufacturer	Points
1		(United States) Ford	195
2	1	(United States) Chevrolet	187
3	1	(Germany) Porsche	186
4		(Germany) BMW	176
5		(Italy) Ferrari	58

GTD Manufacturers' Championship standings
Pos.	+/–	Manufacturer	Points
1		(Italy) Lamborghini	190
2		(United States) Acura	181
3	1	(Germany) Mercedes-AMG	175
4	1	(Japan) Lexus	172
5		(Italy) Ferrari	162

- Note: Only the top five positions are included for all sets of standings.

IMSA SportsCar Championship
Previous race: 6 Hours of The Glen	2018 season	Next race: Northeast Grand Prix
