= Wright Motorsports =

American racing team

(United States) Wright Motorsports
- Founded: 2000
- Founder(s): John Wright
- Base: Batavia, Ohio, United States
- Team principal(s): John Wright; Adam Adelson (owner)
- Current series: IMSA SportsCar Championship; GT World Challenge America
- Current drivers: IMSA SportsCar Championship: 120. (United States) Adam Adelson (United States) Elliott Skeer (Belgium) Jan Heylen (France) Frédéric Makowiecki; GT World Challenge America: 120. (United States) Adam Adelson (United States) Elliott Skeer
- Website: https://www.wrightmotorsports.com/

Wright Motorsports is an American sports car racing team that currently competes in the GTD class of the IMSA SportsCar Championship and in the Pro Cup class in the GT World Challenge America series. The team was founded in 2000 by John Wright.

== History ==
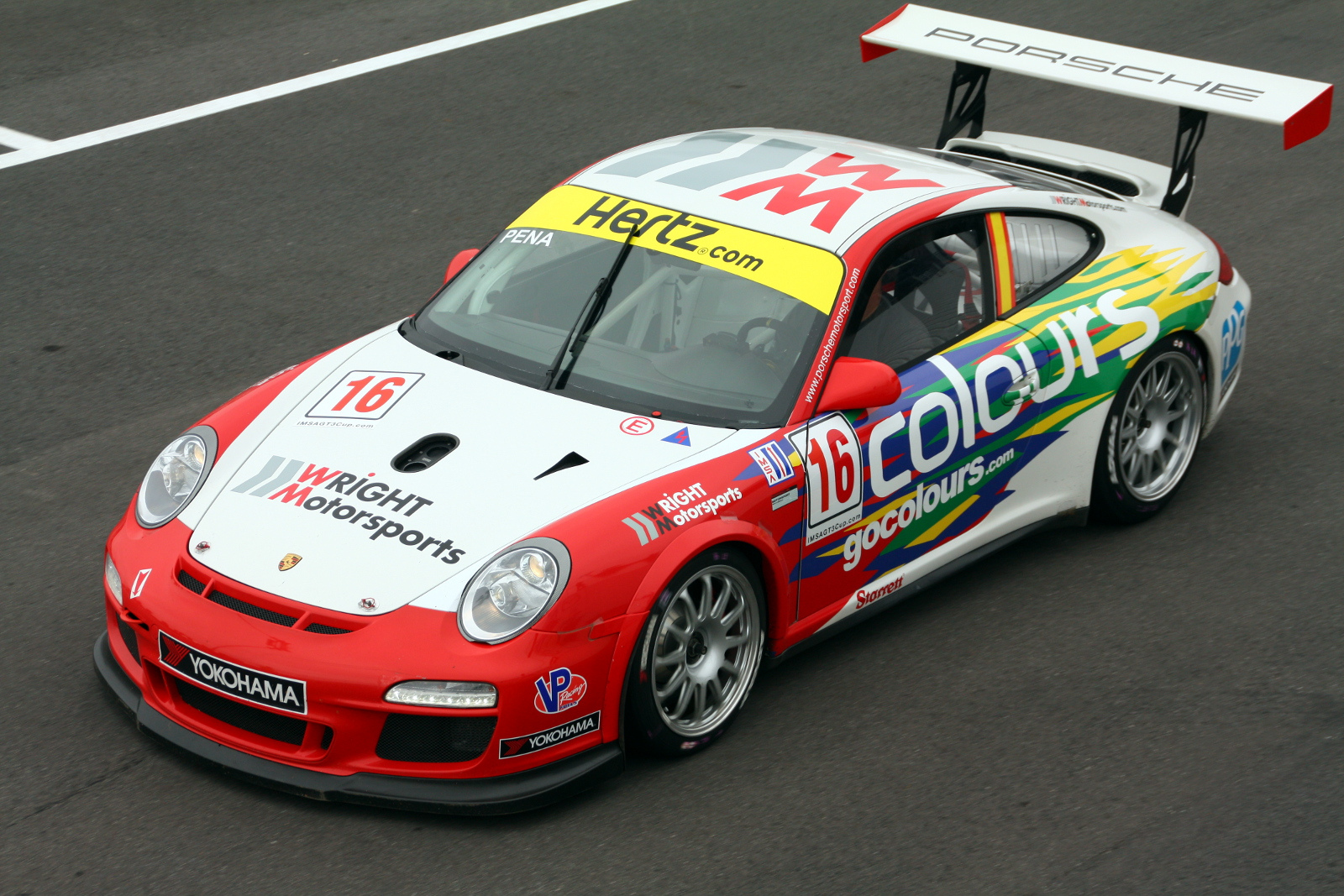
Wright Motorsports' Porsche 997 GT3 Cup in 2012

Wright Motorsports was founded in 2000 by John Wright.

=== IMSA SportsCar Championship ===
==== 2015 ====
In 2015, Wright Motorsports joined the then named United SportsCar Championship. The team fielded a Porsche 911 GT America in the GTD class for Jan Heylen and Madison Snow. Patrick Dempsey and Philipp Eng would join Heylen and Snow at the season opening 2015 24 Hours of Daytona. Their best result would come in Daytona where they would finish third in class.

==== 2018 ====
After a three-year hiatus, the team returned to the series for the 2018 IMSA SportsCar Championship. They signed Patrick Long and Christina Nielsen to drive their No. 58 Porsche 911 GT3 R. Robert Renauer and Matheiu Jaminet would join for the Patron North American Endurance Cup events. The team also entered a second Porsche, the No. 16, Wolf Henzler and Michael Schein at Mid-Ohio, Detroit, and Canadian Tire Motorsport Park. At Road America, the team got their second pole position in a row and went on to get their first win in the championship. They would finish sixth in the GTD class of the championship.

==== 2019 ====
Wright Motorsports would not contest the full 2019 IMSA SportsCar Championship, however, they would return to the series at Lime Rock Park once again fielding a Porsche 911 GT3 R. The team signed Anthony Imperato, Matt Campbell, and Dennis Olsen. Imperato and Olsen would return to the team to compete in the next round at Road America.

==== 2020 ====
For the 2020 season, Wright Motorsports would return to field the No. 16 Porsche 911 GT3 R in the GTD class for Ryan Hardwick and Patrick Long. Klaus Bachler and Anthony Imperato would complete the team's lineup at Daytona for the 24 Hours of Daytona. The team would secure a fourth place finish in GTD at Daytona. Jan Heylen would return to the team for the remainder of the Michelin Endurance Cup. At the final race of the season at Sebring, they would start on pole position and go on to win their first and only win of that season. The No. 16 would finish second in the GTD teams championship behind the No. 86 Meyer Shank Racing with Curb-Agajanian entry.

==== 2021 ====
In December 2020, Wright Motorsports announced that they would field the No. 16 Porsche 911 GT3 R for Patrick Long and Ryan Hardwick in the 2021 IMSA SportsCar Championship. Hardwick sustained a concussion after a crash competing in the Michelin Pilot Challenge. As a result, the team replaced Hardwick for Trent Hindman. Jan Heylen and Klaus Bachler would return to the team for the 24 Hours of Daytona. Hindman would remain with the team for the second round at Sebring as Hardwick elected to sit out for safety reasons. Hardwick would make his team debut at Mid-Ohio, however that would be his only start during the season. Long, Hindman, and Heylen continued with the team for the rest of the season. Despite not competing at every round of the championship, the team still finished fourth in the GTD class.

==== 2022 ====
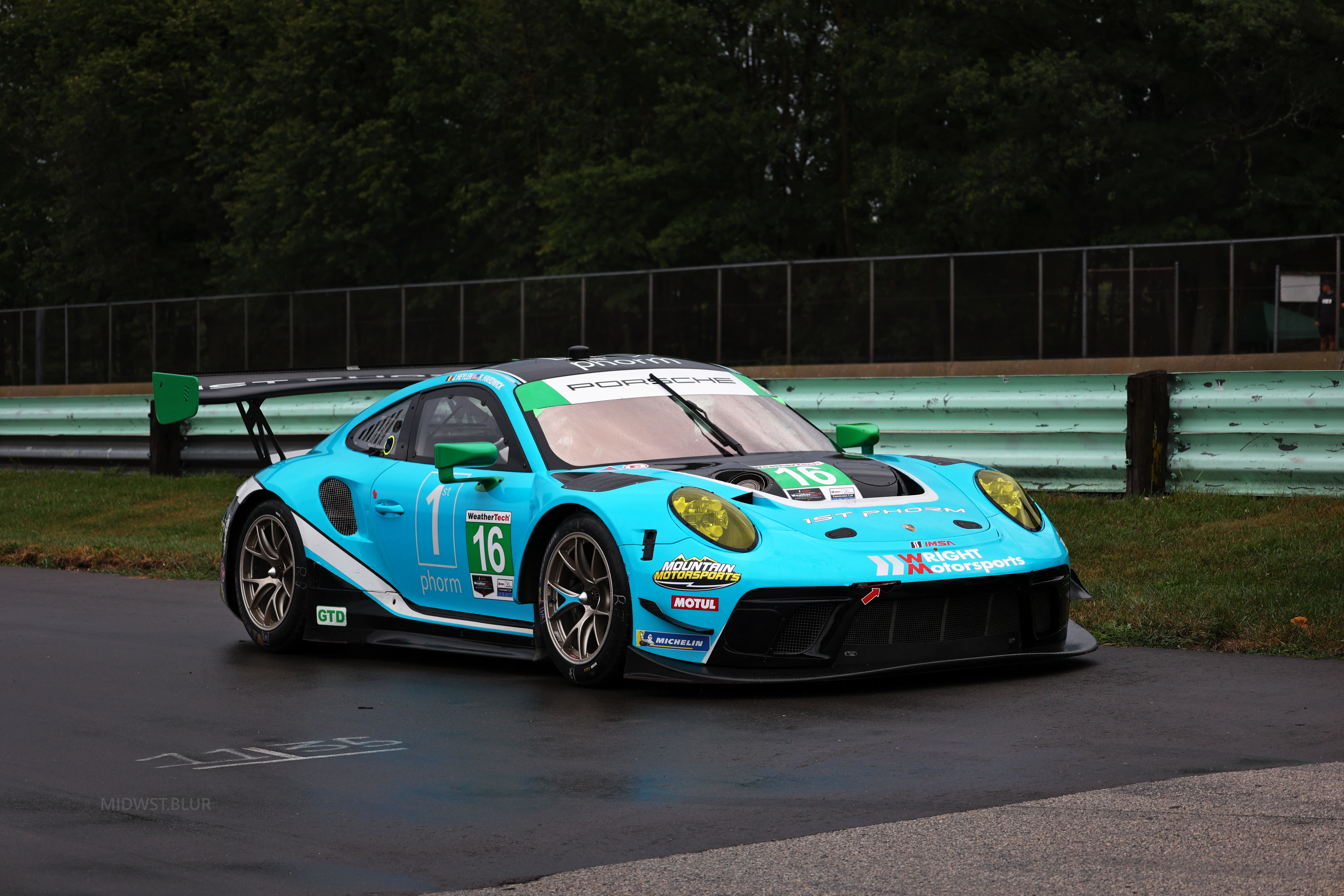
Wright Motorsports' Porsche 911 GT3 R (991.2) at the 2022 IMSA SportsCar Weekend

After winning the 2021 Michelin Pilot Challenge, Wright Motorsports elected to bring the entire driver lineup that season up to the 2022 IMSA SportsCar Championship. Their lineup consisted of Ryan Hardwick, Jan Heylen, and Zacharie Robichon. Richard Lietz would join the team for the 2022 24 Hours of Daytona. The No. 16 Porsche 911 GT3 R qualified 11th for the opening race at Daytona, but the team went on to win the race in the GTD class, securing their first ever win at the 24 Hours of Daytona. The No. 16 got its second win of the year at Laguna Seca. Wright Motorsports was in a tight battle for the championship in GTD with the Heart of Racing Team all season. The No. 16 ultimately came up short, finishing second in the championship, just 23 points shy of the title. The No. 16 would have most likely won the championship had they not missed the Chevrolet Grand Prix at Canadian Tire Motorsport Park.

==== 2023 ====
Following a successful season in 2022, the team expanded to a two car effort for 2023 in the GTD class. Hardwick, Heylen, and Robichon would all remain in the No. 16 Porsche 911 GT3 R (992). For the second entry, Wright Motorsports partnered with Volt Racing to field the No. 77 for Alan Brynjolfsson, Trent Hindman, and Maxwell Root. Dennis Olsen and Kévin Estre joined the Nos. 16 and 77 respectively for the 2023 24 Hours of Daytona. The No. 77 would finish 8th in the GTD team's championship while the No. 16 finished 17th due to only starting four races that season.

==== 2024 ====
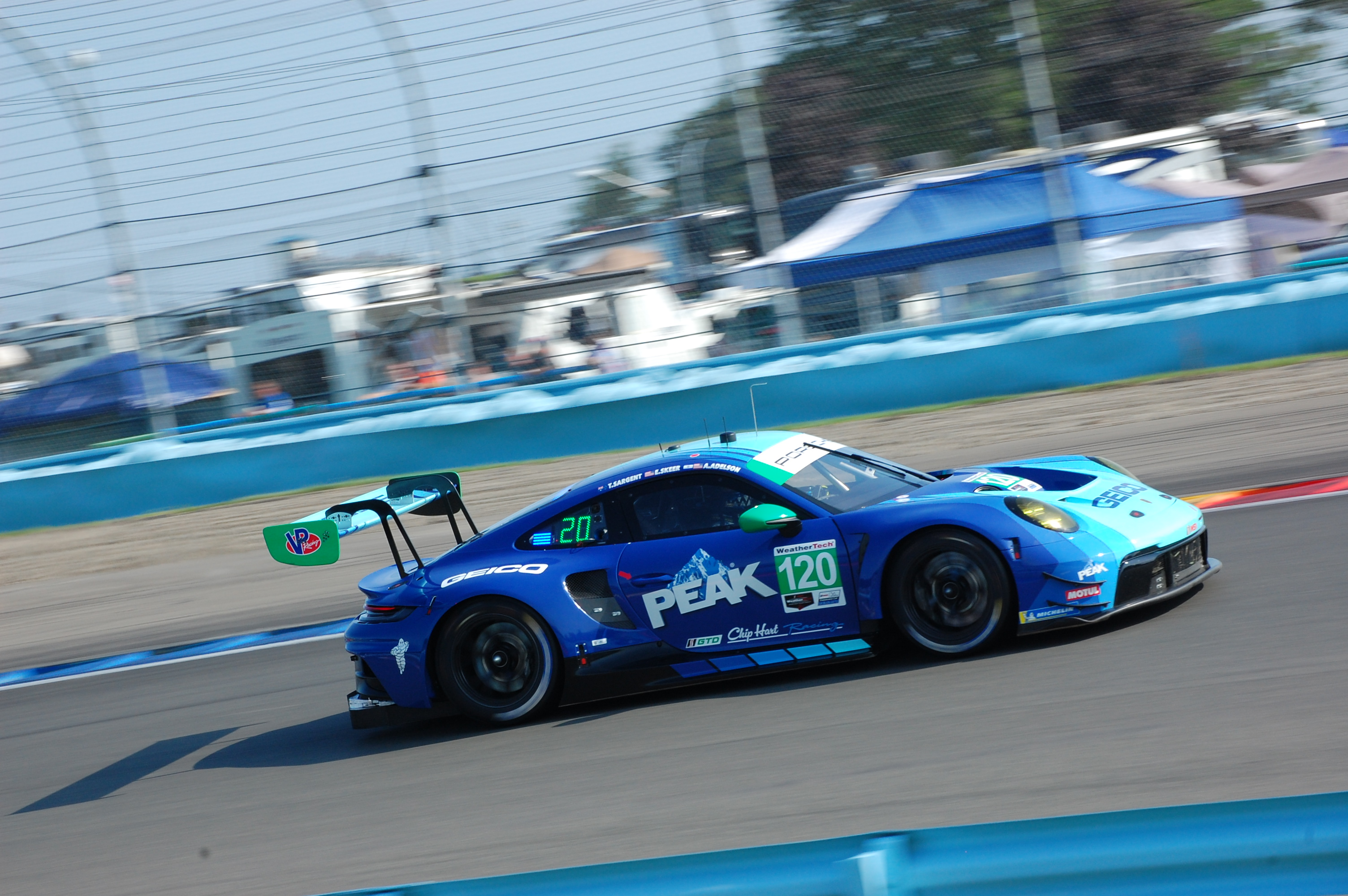
Wright Motorsports' (Chip Hart Racing) Porsche 911 GT3 R (992) at the 2025 Sahlen's Six Hours of The Glen

The team overhauled its lineup for the 2024 IMSA SportsCar Championship, bringing in GT World Challenge America duo Adam Adelson and Elliott Skeer to pilot the No. 120 Porsche 911 GT3 R (992) at the Michelin Endurance Cup rounds. Jan Heylen would join Adelson and Skeer at select races during the season, and Porsche factory driver Frédéric Makowiecki joined the team at Daytona. For the 2024 24 Hours of Daytona, Wright Motorsports partnered with Apple Original Films and film director Joseph Kosinski to be a part of the upcoming F1 film starring Brad Pitt. The No. 120 was decked out in a one-off livery with GEICO and Peak Antifreeze sponsorship logos of the fictional Chip Hart Racing team from the film. Filming cars were provided with fictional names from the film on the car; Sonny Hayes (Pitt), Cale Kelso (Kyle Rankin), and former Porsche factory driver Patrick Long. The actual No. 120 had the real drivers' names on the car. In the second race at Sebring, the team would finish on the podium in third. This marked Adelson's and Skeer's first podium in the championship.

== Racing record ==
=== Complete IMSA SportsCar Championship results ===
(key) (Races in bold indicate pole position; races in italics indicate fastest lap)

Year	Entrant	Class	No	Chassis	Engine	Drivers	1	2	3	4	5	6	7	8	9	10	11	12	Pos.	Pts
2018	(United States) Wright Motorsports	GTD	16	Porsche 911 GT3 R	Porsche 4.0 L Flat-6	(Germany) Wolf Henzler (United States) Michael Schein	DAY	SEB	MOH; 11	BEL; 9	WGL	MOS; 10	LIM; DNS	ELK	VIR	LGA	ATL		17th	63
2018	(United States) Wright Motorsports	GTD	58	Porsche 911 GT3 R	Porsche 4.0 L Flat-6	(United States) Patrick Long (Denmark) Christina Nielsen (Germany) Robert Renauer (France) Mathieu Jaminet	DAY; 19	SEB; 6	MOH; 7	BEL; 11	WGL; 9	MOS; 9	**LIM**; **8**	**ELK**; **1**	VIR; 2	LGA; 11	ATL; 4		6th	263
2019	(United States) Wright Motorsports	GTD	91	Porsche 911 GT3 R	Porsche 4.0 L Flat-6	(United States) Anthony Imperato (Australia) Matt Campbell (Norway) Dennis Olsen	DAY	SEB	MOH	BEL	WGL	MOS	LIM; 5	ELK; 8	VIR	LGA	ATL		19th	49
2020	(United States) Wright Motorsports	GTD	16	Porsche 911 GT3 R	Porsche 4.0 L Flat-6	(United States) Ryan Hardwick (United States) Patrick Long (Austria) Klaus Bachler (United States) Anthony Imperato (Belgium) Jan Heylen	DAY; 1; 4	DAY; 2; 7	SEB; 1; 9	ELK; 5	VIR; 5	ATL; 1; 3	MOH; 3	CLT; 2	ATL; 2; 4	LGA; 6	**SEB**; **2**; 1		2nd	284
2021	(United States) Wright Motorsports	GTD	16	Porsche 911 GT3 R	Porsche 4.0 L Flat-6	(United States) Patrick Long (United States) Trent Hindman (Belgium) Jan Heylen (Austria) Klaus Bachler (United States) Ryan Hardwick	DAY; 4	**SEB**; 2	MOH; 12	BEL	WGL; 1; 8	WGL; 2	LIM; 8	ELK; 3	**LGA**; 3	LBH; 3	VIR; 4	ATL; 5	4th	2943
2022	(United States) Wright Motorsports	GTD	16	Porsche 911 GT3 R	Porsche 4.0 L Flat-6	(United States) Ryan Hardwick (Belgium) Jan Heylen (Canada) Zacharie Robichon (Austria) Richard Lietz	DAY; 1	**SEB**; 10	LBH; 5	LGA; 1	MOH; 9	BEL; 7	WGL; 6	MOS	LIM; 6	ELK; 7	VIR; 5	ATL; 4	2nd	2875
2023	(United States) Wright Motorsports	GTD	16	Porsche 911 GT3 R (992)	Porsche M97/80 4.2 L Flat-6	(United States) Ryan Hardwick (Belgium) Jan Heylen (Canada) Zacharie Robichon (Norway) Dennis Olsen	DAY; 9	SEB; 6	LBH	LGA	WGL; 3	MOS	LIM	ELK	VIR	IMS	ATL; 11		17th	1052
2023	(United States) Wright Motorsports	GTD	77	Porsche 911 GT3 R (992)	Porsche M97/80 4.2 L Flat-6	(United States) Alan Brynjolfsson (United States) Trent Hindman (United States) Maxwell Root (France) Kévin Estre	DAY; 11	SEB; 8	LBH; 10	LGA; 6	WGL; 11	MOS; 7	LIM; 3	ELK; 14	VIR; 9	IMS; 6	ATL; 3		8th	2757
2024	(United States) Wright Motorsports	GTD	120	Porsche 911 GT3 R (992)	Porsche M97/80 4.2 L Flat-6	(United States) Adam Adelson (United States) Elliott Skeer (Belgium) Jan Heylen (France) Frédéric Makowiecki	DAY; 7	SEB; 3	LBH; 16	LGA; 3	WGL; 19	MOS	ELK; 13	VIR; 8	IMS; 1	ATL; 16			8th	2192
2025	(United States) Wright Motorsports	GTD	120	Porsche 911 GT3 R (992)	Porsche M97/80 4.2 L Flat-6	(United States) Adam Adelson (Turkey) Ayhancan Güven (Australia) Tom Sargent (United States) Elliott Skeer	**DAY**; 2	SEB; 5	LBH; 7	LGA; 6	WGL; 13	MOS; 10	ELK; 6	VIR; 7	IMS; 2	ATL; 6			5th	2727

* Season still in progress.
