= 2018 Sports Car Challenge of Mid-Ohio =

Sports car race

The layout of Mid-Ohio Sports Car Course

The 2018 Acura Sports Car Challenge of Mid-Ohio was a sports car race sanctioned by the International Motor Sports Association (IMSA). The race was held at Mid-Ohio Sports Car Course in Lexington, Ohio on May 6, 2018. The race was the fourth of the 2018 IMSA SportsCar Championship.

== Background ==
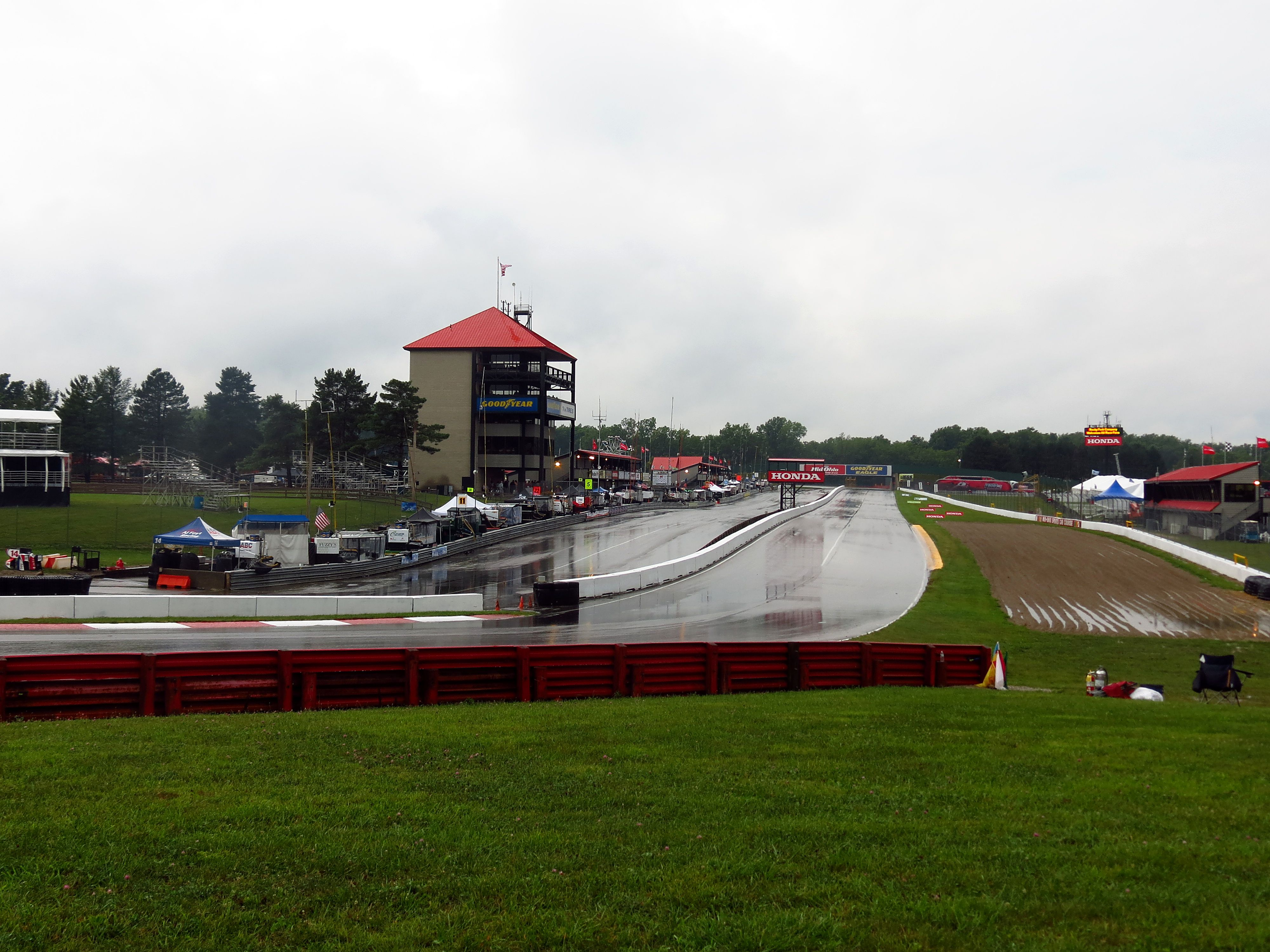
Mid-Ohio Sports Car Course, where the race was held.

International Motor Sports Association's (IMSA) president Scott Atherton confirmed the race was part of the schedule for the 2018 IMSA SportsCar Championship (IMSA SCC) in August 2017. The race marked IMSA's return to Mid-Ohio Sports Car Course for the first time since 2013 as the track replaced Circuit of the Americas after the 2017 season. The 2018 Acura Sports Car Challenge of Mid-Ohio was the fourth of twelve scheduled sports car races of 2018 by IMSA, and it was the second round not held as part of the North American Endurance Cup. The race was held at the thirteen-turn 2.258 mi (3.634 km) Mid-Ohio Sports Car Course on May 6, 2018. On April 11, 2018, Acura was announced as a title sponsor for the event. On April 30, 2018, IMSA announced NBC Sports as its broadcasting partner from 2019 onwards. Michael Shank Racing was renamed to Meyer Shank Racing following Jim Meyer becoming a co-owner of the team.

After the BUBBA Burger Sports Car Grand Prix three weeks earlier, Filipe Albuquerque and João Barbosa led the Prototype Drivers' Championship with 91 points, ahead of Eric Curran and Felipe Nasr with 86 points, and Jon Bennett and Colin Braun with 79 points. With 95 points, the GTLM Drivers' Championship was led by Ryan Briscoe and Richard Westbrook with a seven-point advantage over Oliver Gavin and Tommy Milner. In GTD, the Drivers' Championship was led by Bryan Sellers and Madison Snow with 65 points, ahead Jeroen Bleekemolen, Ben Keating, and Luca Stolz with 58 points. Cadillac, Ford, and Lamborghini were leading their respective Manufacturers' Championships, while Mustang Sampling Racing, Ford Chip Ganassi Racing and Paul Miller Racing each led their own Teams' Championships.

On April 27, 2018, IMSA released the latest technical bulletin outlining Balance of Performance for the prototype class. The Acura ARX-05, Mazda RT24-P, and Nissan Onroak DPi received less turbo boost. The Cadillac DPi-V.R received a 0.6 mm smaller air restrictor while the LMP2 cars didn't get any changes. In GTD, The BMW M6 GT3 received a 20 kilogram weight break and a fuel capacity reduction of 2 liters.

== Entries ==
A total of 34 cars took part in the event split across 3 classes. 14 cars were entered in P, 8 in GTLM, and 12 in GTD. In P, Spencer Pigot subbed for Harry Tincknell in the Mazda Team Joest #55 entry due to a clash with the FIA World Endurance Championship round at Spa-Francorchamps. In GTD, Park Place Motorsports, and Montaplast by Land-Motorsport, CJ Wilson Racing, and Sqaudra Corse Garage Italia were absent. HART skipped due to a lack of funding. Álvaro Parente joined Katherine Legge in the Meyer Shank Racing #86 entry. Wright Motorsports added a second entry featuring Wolf Henzler and Michael Schein. Bill Auberlen joined Dillon Machavern in the Turner Motorsport entry. Maro Engel replaced Thomas Jäger in the SunEnergy1 Racing entry.

== Practice ==
There were three practice sessions preceding the start of the race on Saturday, two on Friday and one on Saturday. The first two one-hour sessions were on Friday morning and afternoon. The third on Saturday morning lasted an hour.

=== Practice 1 ===
The first practice session took place at 9:45 am ET on Friday and ended with Ricky Taylor topping the charts for Acura Team Penske, with a lap time of 1:13.601.

Pos.	Class	No.	Team	Driver	Time	Gap
1	P	7	Acura Team Penske	Ricky Taylor	1:13.601	_
2	P	6	Acura Team Penske	Juan Pablo Montoya	1:14.089	+0.488
3	P	5	Mustang Sampling Racing	Filipe Albuquerque	1:14.608	+1.007

=== Practice 2 ===
The second practice session took place at 3:00 pm ET on Friday and ended with Juan Pablo Montoya topping the charts for Acura Team Penske, with a lap time of 1:36.867.

Pos.	Class	No.	Team	Driver	Time	Gap
1	P	6	Acura Team Penske	Juan Pablo Montoya	1:36.867	_
2	P	7	Acura Team Penske	Hélio Castroneves	1:36.997	+0.130
3	P	10	Wayne Taylor Racing	Jordan Taylor	1:37.215	+0.348

=== Practice 3 ===
The third and final practice session took place at 8:35 am ET on Saturday and ended with Dane Cameron topping the charts for Acura Team Penske, with a lap time of 1:12.675.

Pos.	Class	No.	Team	Driver	Time	Gap
1	P	6	Acura Team Penske	Dane Cameron	1:12.675	_
2	P	7	Acura Team Penske	Hélio Castroneves	1:12.763	+0.457
3	P	55	Mazda Team Joest	Jonathan Bomarito	1:13.767	+0.566

== Qualifying ==
Saturday afternoon's 65-minute qualifying session was divided into three groups. All three categories had 15-minute individual sessions, and regulations stipulated teams to nominate a single driver to qualify their cars. The competitors' fastest lap times determined the starting order with the grid arranged to put the Prototype and GTLM cars ahead of all GTD entries.

=== Qualifying results ===
Pole positions in each class are indicated in bold and by ‡.

Pos.	Class	No.	Team	Driver	Time	Gap	Grid
1	**P**	7	**(United States) Acura Team Penske**	**(Brazil) Hélio Castroneves**	**1:11.837**	**_**	1‡
2	P	6	(United States) Acura Team Penske	(United States) Dane Cameron	1:11.984	+0.147	2
3	P	77	(Germany) Mazda Team Joest	(United Kingdom) Oliver Jarvis	1:12.339	+0.502	3
4	P	55	(Germany) Mazda Team Joest	(United States) Jonathan Bomarito	1:12.596	+0.759	4
5	P	10	(United States) Wayne Taylor Racing	(Netherlands) Renger van der Zande	1:12.600	+0.763	5
6	P	5	(United States) Mustang Sampling Racing	(Portugal) João Barbosa	1:12.943	+1.106	6
7	P	52	(United States) AFS/PR1 Mathiasen Motorsports	(Colombia) Gustavo Yacamán	1:12.982	+1.145	15
8	P	99	(United States) JDC-Miller MotorSports	(Canada) Misha Goikhberg	1:13.035	+1.198	7
9	P	85	(United States) JDC-Miller MotorSports	(United States) Robert Alon	1:13.156	+1.319	16
10	P	38	(United States) Performance Tech Motorsports	(United States) James French	1:13.365	+1.528	8
11	P	22	(United States) Tequila Patrón ESM	(United States) Johannes van Overbeek	1:13.532	+1.695	9
12	P	31	(United States) Whelen Engineering Racing	(United States) Eric Curran	1:13.583	+1.746	10
13	P	2	(United States) Tequila Patrón ESM	(United States) Scott Sharp	1:14.347	+2.510	11
14	P	54	(United States) CORE Autosport	(United States) Jon Bennett	1:14.351	+2.514	12
15	**GTLM**	**24**	**(United States) BMW Team RLL**	**(United States) John Edwards**	**1:17.853**	**+6.016**	13‡
16	GTLM	911	(United States) Porsche GT Team	(United Kingdom) Nick Tandy	1:17.919	+6.082	14
17	GTLM	25	(United States) BMW Team RLL	(United Kingdom) Alexander Sims	1:17.932	+6.095	17
18	GTLM	912	(United States) Porsche GT Team	(New Zealand) Earl Bamber	1:18.021	+6.184	18
19	GTLM	3	(United States) Corvette Racing	(Spain) Antonio García	1:18.114	+6.277	19
20	GTLM	66	(United States) Ford Chip Ganassi Racing	(Germany) Dirk Müller	1:18.207	+6.370	20
21	GTLM	67	(United States) Ford Chip Ganassi Racing	(Australia) Ryan Briscoe	1:18.333	+6.496	21
22	GTLM	4	(United States) Corvette Racing	(United States) Tommy Milner	1:18.452	+6.615	22
23	**GTD**	**15**	**(United States) 3GT Racing**	**(United Kingdom) Jack Hawksworth**	**1:19.317**	**+7.480**	23‡
24	GTD	14	(United States) 3GT Racing	(Canada) Kyle Marcelli	1:19.370	+7.533	24
25	GTD	48	(United States) Paul Miller Racing	(United States) Madison Snow	1:19.882	+8.045	25
26	GTD	86	(United States) Meyer Shank Racing with Curb-Agajanin	(United Kingdom) Katherine Legge	1:19.933	+8.096	26
27	GTD	96	(United States) Turner Motorsport	(United States) Dillon Machavern	1:20.339	+8.502	27
28	GTD	93	(United States) Meyer Shank Racing with Curb-Agajanin	(United States) Justin Marks	1:20.477	+8.640	28
29	GTD	58	(United States) Wright Motorsports	(Denmark) Christina Nielsen	1:20.748	+8.911	29
30	GTD	63	(United States) Scuderia Corsa	(United States) Cooper MacNeil	1:20.846	+9.009	30
31	GTD	16	(United States) Wright Motorsports	(United States) Michael Schein	1:21.043	+9.206	31
32	GTD	33	(United States) Mercedes-AMG Team Riley Motorsport	(United States) Ben Keating	1:21.244	+9.407	32^{1}
33	GTD	44	(United States) Magnus Racing	(United States) John Potter	1:21.379	+9.542	33^{2}
34	GTD	75	(United States) SunEnergy1 Racing	(Australia) Kenny Habul	1:21.733	+9.896	34^{3}
Sources:

- ^{1} The No. 33 Mercedes-AMG Team Riley Motorsport entry was moved to the back of the GTD field after the team elected to change tires after qualifying.
- ^{2} The No. 44 Magnus Racing entry was moved to the back of the GTD field after the team elected to change tires after qualifying.
- ^{3} The No. 75 SunEnergy1 Racing entry was moved to the back of the GTD field after the team elected to change tires after qualifying.

== Race ==
=== Post-race ===
The result kept Albuquerque and Barbosa atop the Prototype Drivers' Championship with 119 points, 10 points ahead of second-place finishers Nasr and Curran. Hélio Castroneves and Ricky Taylor advanced from tenth to fourth while Bennett and Braun dropped from third to fifth. The result kept Briscoe and Westbrook atop the GTLM Drivers' Championship with 121 points. Bamber and Vanthoor advanced from sixth to second. The result kept Sellers and Snow atop the GTD Drivers' Championship with 95 points. Legge and Parente advanced from third to second. Cadillac and Lamborghini continued to top their respective Manufacturers' Championships. Porsche took the lead of the GTLM Manufactures' Championship while Mustang Sampling Racing, Ford Chip Ganassi Racing, and Paul Miller Racing kept their respective advantages in the Teams' Championships with eight rounds remaining.

=== Results ===
Class winners are denoted in bold and ‡.

Final race classification
Pos	Class	No.	Team	Drivers	Chassis	Tire	Laps	Time/Retired
Pos	Class	No.	Team	Drivers	Engine	Tire	Laps	Time/Retired
1	**P**	**7**	**(United States) Acura Team Penske**	**(Brazil) Hélio Castroneves (United States) Ricky Taylor**	**Acura ARX-05**	C	**125**	**2:40.59.579‡**
1	**P**	**7**	**(United States) Acura Team Penske**	**(Brazil) Hélio Castroneves (United States) Ricky Taylor**	**Acura** **AR35TT 3.5 L Turbo V6**	C	**125**	**2:40.59.579‡**
2	P	6	(United States) Acura Team Penske	(United States) Dane Cameron (Colombia) Juan Pablo Montoya	Acura ARX-05	C	125	+8.464
2	P	6	(United States) Acura Team Penske	(United States) Dane Cameron (Colombia) Juan Pablo Montoya	Acura AR35TT 3.5 L Turbo V6	C	125	+8.464
3	P	77	(Germany) Mazda Team Joest	(United Kingdom) Oliver Jarvis (United States) Tristan Nunez	Mazda RT24-P	C	125	+26.774
3	P	77	(Germany) Mazda Team Joest	(United Kingdom) Oliver Jarvis (United States) Tristan Nunez	Mazda MZ-2.0T 2.0L Turbo I4	C	125	+26.774
4	P	5	(United States) Mustang Sampling Racing	(Portugal) Filipe Albuquerque (Portugal) João Barbosa	Cadillac DPi-V.R	C	125	+56.826
4	P	5	(United States) Mustang Sampling Racing	(Portugal) Filipe Albuquerque (Portugal) João Barbosa	Cadillac 5.5 L V8	C	125	+56.826
5	P	10	(United States) Wayne Taylor Racing	(United States) Jordan Taylor (Netherlands) Renger van der Zande	Cadillac DPi-V.R	C	125	+57.825
5	P	10	(United States) Wayne Taylor Racing	(United States) Jordan Taylor (Netherlands) Renger van der Zande	Cadillac 5.5 L V8	C	125	+57.825
6	P	52	(United States) AFS/PR1 Mathiasen Motorsports	(Colombia) Sebastián Saavedra (Colombia) Gustavo Yacamán	Ligier JS P217	C	125	+1:13.876
6	P	52	(United States) AFS/PR1 Mathiasen Motorsports	(Colombia) Sebastián Saavedra (Colombia) Gustavo Yacamán	Gibson GK428 4.2 L V8	C	125	+1:13.876
7	P	99	(United States) JDC-Miller MotorSports	(Canada) Misha Goikhberg (South Africa) Stephen Simpson	Oreca 07	C	125	+1:15.636
7	P	99	(United States) JDC-Miller MotorSports	(Canada) Misha Goikhberg (South Africa) Stephen Simpson	Gibson GK428 4.2 L V8	C	125	+1:15.636
8	P	31	(United States) Whelen Engineering Racing	(Brazil) Felipe Nasr (United States) Eric Curran	Cadillac DPi-V.R	C	124	+1 lap
8	P	31	(United States) Whelen Engineering Racing	(Brazil) Felipe Nasr (United States) Eric Curran	Cadillac 5.5 L V8	C	124	+1 lap
9	P	22	(United States) Tequila Patrón ESM	(Brazil) Pipo Derani (United States) Johannes van Overbeek	Nissan Onroak DPi	C	124	+1 lap
9	P	22	(United States) Tequila Patrón ESM	(Brazil) Pipo Derani (United States) Johannes van Overbeek	Nissan VR38DETT 3.8 L Turbo V6	C	124	+1 lap
10	P	2	(United States) Tequila Patrón ESM	(United Kingdom) Ryan Dalziel (United States) Scott Sharp	Nissan Onroak DPi	C	123	+2 Laps
10	P	2	(United States) Tequila Patrón ESM	(United Kingdom) Ryan Dalziel (United States) Scott Sharp	Nissan VR38DETT 3.8 L Turbo V6	C	123	+2 Laps
11	P	38	(United States) Performance Tech Motorsports	(United States) James French (United States) Kyle Masson	Oreca 07	C	123	+2 Laps
11	P	38	(United States) Performance Tech Motorsports	(United States) James French (United States) Kyle Masson	Gibson GK428 4.2 L V8	C	123	+2 Laps
12	P	85	(United States) JDC-Miller MotorSports	(United States) Robert Alon (Switzerland) Simon Trummer	Oreca 07	C	123	+2 Laps
12	P	85	(United States) JDC-Miller MotorSports	(United States) Robert Alon (Switzerland) Simon Trummer	Gibson GK428 4.2 L V8	C	123	+2 Laps
13	P	54	(United States) CORE Autosport	(United States) Jon Bennett (United States) Colin Braun	Oreca 07	C	123	+2 Laps
13	P	54	(United States) CORE Autosport	(United States) Jon Bennett (United States) Colin Braun	Gibson GK428 4.2 L V8	C	123	+2 Laps
14	**GTLM**	**912**	**(United States) Porsche GT Team**	**(New Zealand) Earl Bamber** **(Belgium) Laurens Vanthoor**	**Porsche 911 RSR**	M	**118**	**+7 Laps‡**
14	**GTLM**	**912**	**(United States) Porsche GT Team**	**(New Zealand) Earl Bamber** **(Belgium) Laurens Vanthoor**	**Porsche 4.0 L Flat-6**	M	**118**	**+7 Laps‡**
15	GTLM	25	(United States) BMW Team RLL	(United States) Connor De Phillippi (United Kingdom) Alexander Sims	BMW M8 GTE	M	118	+7 Laps
15	GTLM	25	(United States) BMW Team RLL	(United States) Connor De Phillippi (United Kingdom) Alexander Sims	BMW S63 4.0 L Turbo V8	M	118	+7 Laps
16	GTLM	3	(United States) Corvette Racing	(Spain) Antonio García (Denmark) Jan Magnussen	Chevrolet Corvette C7.R	M	118	+7 Laps
16	GTLM	3	(United States) Corvette Racing	(Spain) Antonio García (Denmark) Jan Magnussen	Chevrolet LT5.5 5.5 L V8	M	118	+7 Laps
17	GTLM	66	(United States) Ford Chip Ganassi Racing	(United States) Joey Hand (Germany) Dirk Müller	Ford GT	M	118	+7 Laps
17	GTLM	66	(United States) Ford Chip Ganassi Racing	(United States) Joey Hand (Germany) Dirk Müller	Ford EcoBoost 3.5 L Turbo V6	M	118	+7 Laps
18	GTLM	67	(United States) Ford Chip Ganassi Racing	(Australia) Ryan Briscoe (United Kingdom) Richard Westbrook	Ford GT	M	118	+7 Laps
18	GTLM	67	(United States) Ford Chip Ganassi Racing	(Australia) Ryan Briscoe (United Kingdom) Richard Westbrook	Ford EcoBoost 3.5 L Turbo V6	M	118	+7 Laps
19	GTLM	911	(United States) Porsche GT Team	(France) Patrick Pilet (United Kingdom) Nick Tandy	Porsche 911 RSR	M	118	+7 Laps
19	GTLM	911	(United States) Porsche GT Team	(France) Patrick Pilet (United Kingdom) Nick Tandy	Porsche 4.0 L Flat-6	M	118	+7 Laps
20	GTLM	24	(United States) BMW Team RLL	(United States) John Edwards (Finland) Jesse Krohn	BMW M8 GTE	M	118	+7 Laps
20	GTLM	24	(United States) BMW Team RLL	(United States) John Edwards (Finland) Jesse Krohn	BMW S63 4.0 L Turbo V8	M	118	+7 Laps
21	GTLM	4	(United States) Corvette Racing	(United Kingdom) Oliver Gavin (United States) Tommy Milner	Chevrolet Corvette C7.R	M	118	+7 Laps
21	GTLM	4	(United States) Corvette Racing	(United Kingdom) Oliver Gavin (United States) Tommy Milner	Chevrolet LT5.5 5.5 L V8	M	118	+7 Laps
22	**GTD**	**14**	**(United States) 3GT Racing**	**(Austria) Dominik Baumann** **(Canada) Kyle Marcelli**	**Lexus RC F GT3**	C	**116**	**+9 Laps**‡
22	**GTD**	**14**	**(United States) 3GT Racing**	**(Austria) Dominik Baumann** **(Canada) Kyle Marcelli**	**Lexus** **5.0L V8**	C	**116**	**+9 Laps**‡
23	GTD	86	(United States) Meyer Shank Racing with Curb-Agajanin	**(United Kingdom) Katherine Legge** **(Portugal) Álvaro Parente**	Acura NSX GT3	C	116	+9 Laps
23	GTD	86	(United States) Meyer Shank Racing with Curb-Agajanin	**(United Kingdom) Katherine Legge** **(Portugal) Álvaro Parente**	Acura 3.5 L Turbo V6	C	116	+9 Laps
24	GTD	48	(United States) Paul Miller Racing	(United States) Bryan Sellers (United States) Madison Snow	Lamborghini Huracán GT3	C	115	+10 Laps
24	GTD	48	(United States) Paul Miller Racing	(United States) Bryan Sellers (United States) Madison Snow	Lamborghini 5.2 L V10	C	115	+10 Laps
25	GTD	15	(United States) 3GT Racing	(United Kingdom) Jack Hawksworth (Denmark) David Heinemeier Hansson	Lexus RC F GT3	C	115	+10 Laps
25	GTD	15	(United States) 3GT Racing	(United Kingdom) Jack Hawksworth (Denmark) David Heinemeier Hansson	Lexus 5.0L V8	C	115	+10 Laps
26	GTD	93	(United States) Meyer Shank Racing with Curb-Agajanin	(United States) Justin Marks (United States) Lawson Aschenbach	Acura NSX GT3	C	115	+10 Laps
26	GTD	93	(United States) Meyer Shank Racing with Curb-Agajanin	(United States) Justin Marks (United States) Lawson Aschenbach	Acura 3.5 L Turbo V6	C	115	+10 Laps
27	GTD	96	(United States) Turner Motorsport	(United States) Dillon Machavern (United States) Bill Auberlen	BMW M6 GT3	C	115	+10 Laps
27	GTD	96	(United States) Turner Motorsport	(United States) Dillon Machavern (United States) Bill Auberlen	BMW 4.4 L Turbo V8	C	115	+10 Laps
28	GTD	58	(United States) Wright Motorsports	(United States) Patrick Long (Denmark) Christina Nielsen	Porsche 911 GT3 R	C	115	+10 Laps
28	GTD	58	(United States) Wright Motorsports	(United States) Patrick Long (Denmark) Christina Nielsen	Porsche 4.0 L Flat-6	C	115	+10 Laps
29	GTD	63	(United States) Scuderia Corsa	(Italy) Alessandro Balzan (United States) Cooper MacNeil	Ferrari 488 GT3	C	115	+10 Laps
29	GTD	63	(United States) Scuderia Corsa	(Italy) Alessandro Balzan (United States) Cooper MacNeil	Ferrari F154CB 3.9 L Turbo V8	C	115	+10 Laps
30	GTD	33	(United States) Mercedes-AMG Team Riley Motorsport	(Netherlands) Jeroen Bleekemolen (United States) Ben Keating	Mercedes AMG GT3	C	115	+10 Laps
30	GTD	33	(United States) Mercedes-AMG Team Riley Motorsport	(Netherlands) Jeroen Bleekemolen (United States) Ben Keating	Mercedes-AMG M159 6.2 L V8	C	115	+10 Laps
31	GTD	44	(United States) Magnus Racing	(United States) John Potter (United States) Andy Lally	Audi R8 LMS GT3	C	115	+10 Laps
31	GTD	44	(United States) Magnus Racing	(United States) John Potter (United States) Andy Lally	Audi 5.2L V10	C	115	+10 Laps
32	GTD	16	(United States) Wright Motorsports	(United States) Michael Schein (Germany) Wolf Henzler	Porsche 911 GT3 R	C	113	+12 Laps
32	GTD	16	(United States) Wright Motorsports	(United States) Michael Schein (Germany) Wolf Henzler	Porsche 4.0 L Flat-6	C	113	+12 Laps
33	GTD	75	(United States) SunEnergy1 Racing	(Australia) Kenny Habul (Germany) Maro Engel	Mercedes AMG GT3	C	99	+26 Laps
33	GTD	75	(United States) SunEnergy1 Racing	(Australia) Kenny Habul (Germany) Maro Engel	Mercedes-AMG M159 6.2 L V8	C	99	+26 Laps
34 DNF	P	55	(Germany) Mazda Team Joest	(United States) Jonathan Bomarito (United States) Spencer Pigot	Mazda RT24-P	C	73	Rear End
34 DNF	P	55	(Germany) Mazda Team Joest	(United States) Jonathan Bomarito (United States) Spencer Pigot	Mazda MZ-2.0T 2.0L Turbo I4	C	73	Rear End

Tyre manufacturers
Key
Symbol	Tyre manufacturer
**C**	Continental
**M**	Michelin

== Standings after the race ==
Prototype Drivers' Championship standings
Pos.	+/–	Driver	Points
1		(Portugal) Filipe Albuquerque (Portugal) João Barbosa	119
2		(United States) Eric Curran (Brazil) Felipe Nasr	109
3	1	(United States) Jordan Taylor (Netherlands) Renger van der Zande	104
4	6	(Brazil) Hélio Castroneves (United States) Ricky Taylor	98
5	2	(United States) Jon Bennett (United States) Colin Braun	97

GTLM Drivers' Championship standings
Pos.	+/–	Driver	Points
1		(Australia) Ryan Briscoe (United Kingdom) Richard Westbrook	121
2	4	(New Zealand) Earl Bamber (Belgium) Laurens Vanthoor	114
3		(United States) Joey Hand (Germany) Dirk Müller	112
4	2	(United Kingdom) Oliver Gavin (United States) Tommy Milner	111
5		(Spain) Antonio García (Denmark) Jan Magnussen	111

GTD Drivers' Championship standings
Pos.	+/–	Driver	Points
1		(United States) Bryan Sellers (United States) Madison Snow	95
2	1	(United Kingdom) Katherine Legge (Portugal) Álvaro Parente	87
3	1	(Netherlands) Jeroen Bleekemolen (United States) Ben Keating	80
4		(United States) Cooper MacNeil (Italy) Alessandro Balzan	76
5	1	(United Kingdom) Jack Hawksworth (Denmark) David Heinemeier Hansson	76

- Note: Only the top five positions are included for all sets of standings.

Prototype Teams' Championship standings
Pos.	+/–	Team	Points
1		(United States) No. 5 Mustang Sampling Racing	119
2		(United States) No. 31 Whelen Engineering Racing	109
3	1	(United States) No. 10 Wayne Taylor Racing	104
4	6	(United States) No. 7 Acura Team Penske	98
5	2	(United States) No. 54 CORE Autosport	97

GTLM Teams' Championship standings
Pos.	+/–	Team	Points
1		(United States) No. 67 Ford Chip Ganassi Racing	121
2	4	(United States) No. 912 Porsche GT Team	114
3	1	(United States) No. 66 Ford Chip Ganassi Racing	112
4	2	(United States) No. 4 Corvette Racing	111
5	1	(United States) No. 3 Corvette Racing	111

GTD Teams' Championship standings
Pos.	+/–	Team	Points
1		(United States) No. 48 Paul Miller Racing	95
2	1	(United States) No. 86 Michael Shank Racing with Curb-Agajanian	87
3	1	(United States) No. 33 Mercedes-AMG Team Riley Motorsports	80
4		(United States) No. 63 Scuderia Corsa	76
5	1	(United States) No. 15 3GT Racing	76

- Note: Only the top five positions are included for all sets of standings.

Prototype Manufacturers' Championship standings
Pos.	+/–	Manufacturer	Points
1		(United States) Cadillac	132
2		(Japan) Nissan	128
3	1	(United States) Acura	123
4	1	(Japan) Mazda	122

GTLM Manufacturers' Championship standings
Pos.	+/–	Manufacturer	Points
1	2	(Germany) Porsche	126
2	1	(United States) Ford	125
3	1	(United States) Chevrolet	123
4		(Germany) BMW	120
5		(Italy) Ferrari	58

GTD Manufacturers' Championship standings
Pos.	+/–	Manufacturer	Points
1		(Italy) Lamborghini	100
2	2	(United States) Acura	88
3	3	(Japan) Lexus	86
4	2	(Italy) Ferrari	85
5	2	(Germany) Mercedes-AMG	84

- Note: Only the top five positions are included for all sets of standings.

IMSA SportsCar Championship
Previous race: BUBBA Grand Prix of Long Beach	2018 season	Next race: Chevrolet Sports Car Classic
