= Lawson Aschenbach =

American auto racing driver

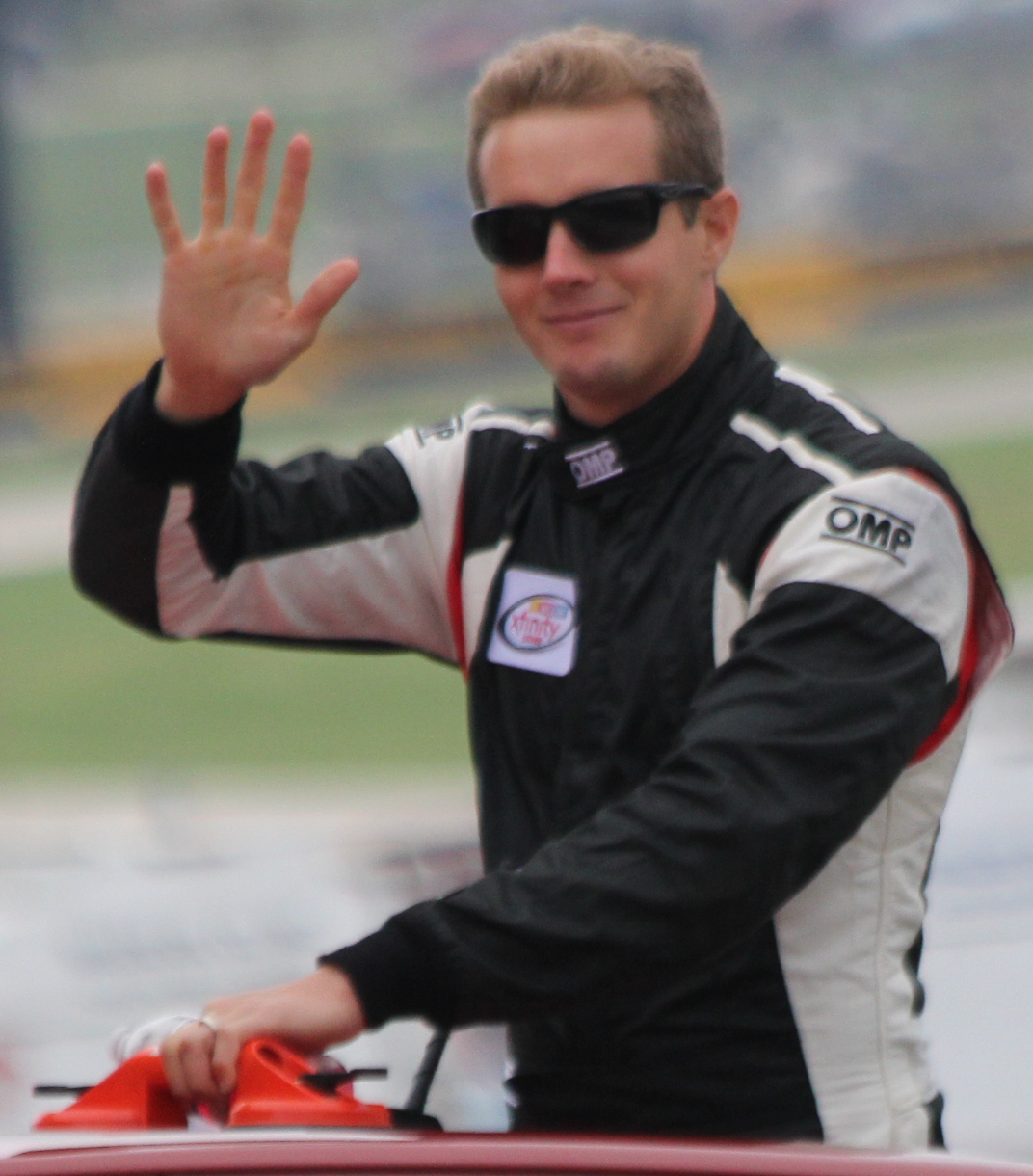
- Aschenbach at Road America in 2015
- Nationality: (United States) American
- Born: William Lawson Aschenbach; November 22, 1983 (age 42) Gaithersburg, Maryland, U.S.

Pirelli World Challenge career
- Debut season: 2005
- Current team: Stevenson Motorsports
- Categorisation: FIA Silver (until 2013); FIA Gold (2014–)

Championship titles
- 2006, 2010, 2011, 2013, 2014: Pirelli World Challenge

NASCAR O'Reilly Auto Parts Series career
- 5 races run over 2 years
- Car no., team: No. 0 (JD Motorsports)
- 2019 position: 53rd
- Best finish: 53rd (2019)
- First race: 2015 Road America 180 (Road America)
- Last race: 2019 Drive for the Cure 250 (Charlotte Roval)
Wins	Top tens	Poles
0	0	0
- Statistics up to date as of November 18, 2019.

William Lawson Aschenbach (born November 22, 1983) is an American professional racing driver. He is a four-time Pirelli World Challenge champion, and most recently, the 2014 Pirelli World Challenge GTS Champion. He is the 2006 SPEED World Challenge (later Pirelli World Challenge) Rookie of the Year and became the first person to win the SPEED GT Championship in his rookie season. He is also the champion of the 2010 Grand-Am Continental Tire Sports Car Challenge (later IMSA Continental Tire Sports Car Challenge) ST Championship and 2014 Lamborghini Super Trofeo ProAM World Champion. Aschenbach first raced professionally in 2005. He currently races for Stevenson Motorsports in the IMSA Continental Tire Sports Car Challenge.

== Amateur career ==
Aschenbach was born in Gaithersburg, Maryland and began kart racing at age 8. He was introduced to kart racing by his father, who drove him to his first competitions. In 1998, Aschenbach won the World Karting Association Gold Cup. He won an additional four WKA Grand Nationals titles and the North American Karting Championship before moving onto racecars at age 16. In 2001, Aschenbach won the SCCA Southeast National Formula Ford title. He won the SCCA Pro FF2000 series’ Road to Indy Oval Crown Championship a year later.

== Professional career ==
Aschenbach began racing professionally in the SPEED World Challenge (later Pirelli World Challenge) in 2005 and had a podium finish in his first GT race. In 2006, during his first full SPEED World Challenge GT season, Aschenbach won at the Grand Prix of St. Petersburg and placed second at both Mid-Ohio Sports Car Course and Road America. He never finished lower than ninth that season, and became the first driver to win the SPEED GT Championship in his rookie season. That year, Porsche won the SPEED GT Manufacturers’ Championship over second-place Dodge by three points. Aschenbach began driving for Team Cadillac during the 2007 SPEED World Championship GT season and finished the season ranked third. That year, Aschenbach and teammate Andy Pilgrim led Team Cadillac to the SPEED GT Manufacturers’ Championship.

In 2010, Aschenbach and co-pilot David Thilenius won the Grand-Am Continental Tire Sports Car Challenge (later IMSA Continental Tire Sports Car Challenge) ST Championship with team Compass360. The championship was decided on the final day of racing, with Lawson and David winning the overall championship via tiebreaker. Aschenbach and Compass360 won the subsequent tiebreaker with their third-place finish at Miller Motorsports Park.

Aschenbach won the 2011 Pirelli World Challenge Touring Car Championship while piloting a Honda Civic Si for Team Compass360. He won five races and poles that season, and led Honda to the Pirelli World Challenge Touring Car Manufacturers’ Championship. Aschenbach clinched the championship in the second-to-last race that year and finished the season with 1,543 points.

Aschenbach later joined Blackdog Speed Shop and piloted the team's Chevrolet Camaro to the 2013 Pirelli World Challenge GTS Championship in what was his first season in the division. Aschenbach scored his first win that season in what was only his second weekend with Blackdog. He won a class-best six races that season, but trailed Jack Baldwin until the last race of the season held at Grand Prix of Houston. Aschenbach's win at Houston secured the overall championship.

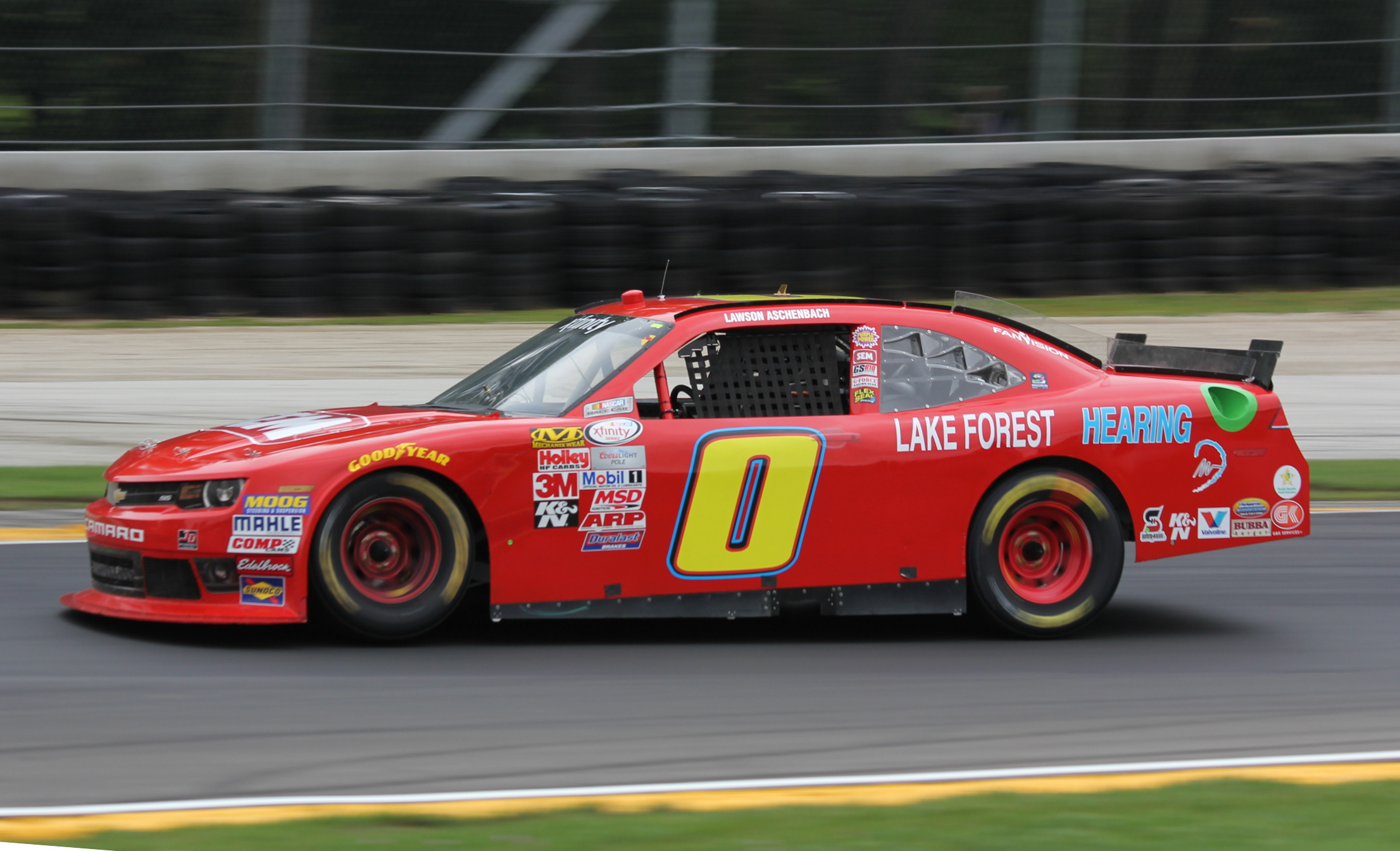
Aschenbach's NASCAR Xfinity Series car at Road America in 2015

Aschenbach repeated as Pirelli World Challenge GTS Champion in 2014 in his second season driving for Blackdog Speed Shop. He clinched the championship during the final race day of the year, which was held at Miller Motorsports Park. In the first race of a doubleheader at the track, Aschenbach placed fourth and moved within to two points of the overall lead. His second-place finish in the final race of the season secured for him the overall GTS championship. Aschenbach finished the season with four wins overall. Later that year, he won the 2014 Lamborghini Super Trofeo ProAm World Championship at the Sepang Circuit with co-pilot Kevin Conway and Change Racing.

== Personal life ==
Aschenbach is an alumnus of Landon School. He is a 2006 graduate of Vanderbilt University, where he earned a Bachelor of Science while double majoring in engineering and mathematics. Aschenbach married Beth Beattie in November 2013.

== Motorsports career results ==
=== NASCAR ===
(key) (Bold – Pole position awarded by qualifying time. Italics – Pole position earned by points standings or practice time. * – Most laps led.)

==== Xfinity Series ====
NASCAR Xfinity Series results
Year	Team	No.	Make	1	2	3	4	5	6	7	8	9	10	11	12	13	14	15	16	17	18	19	20	21	22	23	24	25	26	27	28	29	30	31	32	33	NXSC	Pts	Ref
2015	JD Motorsports	0	Chevy	DAY	ATL	LVS	PHO	CAL	TEX	BRI	RCH	TAL	IOW	CLT	DOV	MCH	CHI	DAY	KEN	NHA	IND	IOW	GLN	MOH	BRI	ROA; 18	DAR	RCH	CHI	KEN	DOV	CLT	KAN	TEX	PHO	HOM	66th	26	
2018	JD Motorsports	01	Chevy	DAY	ATL	LVS	PHO	CAL	TEX	BRI	RCH	TAL	DOV	CLT	POC	MCH	IOW	CHI	DAY	KEN	NHA	IOW	GLN	MOH	BRI	ROA	DAR	IND	LVS	RCH	CLT; 21	DOV	KAN	TEX	PHO	HOM	65th	17	
2019	JD Motorsports	4	Chevy	DAY	ATL	LVS	PHO	CAL	TEX	BRI	RCH	TAL	DOV	CLT	POC	MCH	IOW	CHI	DAY	KEN	NHA	IOW	GLN	MOH; 28	BRI	ROA	DAR	IND	LVS	RCH							53rd	35	
2019	JD Motorsports	0	Chevy																												CLT; 14	DOV	KAN	TEX	PHO	HOM	53rd	35	

=== Sports car racing ===
==== IMSA WeatherTech SportsCar Championship results ====
Year	Team	Make	Engine	Class	1	2	3	4	5	6	7	8	9	10	11	12	Rank	Points
2016	Stevenson Motorsport	Audi R8 LMS	Audi 5.2 L V10	GTD	DAY; 14	SEB; 16	LGA; 9	BEL; 13	WGL; 6	MOS; 9	LIM; 5	ELK; 6	VIR; 2	AUS; 12	PET; 5		8th	258
2017	Stevenson Motorsports	Audi R8 LMS	Audi 5.2 L V10	GTD	DAY; 4	SEB; 7	LBH; 13	AUS; 10	BEL; **13**	WGL; 9	MOS; 1	LIM; 4	ELK; 3	VIR; 12	LGA; 11	PET; 13	7th	283
2018	Michael Shank Racing with Curb Agajanian	Acura NSX GT3	Acura 3.5 L Turbo V6	GTD	DAY; 11	SEB; 7	MOH; 5	BEL; 2	WGL; 14	**MOS**; 6	LIM; 9	ELK; 8	VIR; 9	LGA; 13	PET; 12		9th	249
2019	Precision Performance Motorsports	Lamborghini Huracán GT3 Evo	Lamborghini 5.2 L V10	GTD	DAY	SEB; 12	MOH	DET	WGL	MOS	LIM	ELK	VIR	LGA	PET		22nd	102
2019	Lone Star Racing	Mercedes-AMG GT3	Mercedes-AMG M159 6.2 L V8	GTD	DAY	SEB	MOH; 11	DET; 7	WGL	MOS; 11	LIM	ELK; 11	VIR; 8	LGA	PET		22nd	102
2020	Riley Motorsports	Mercedes-AMG GT3 Evo	Mercedes-AMG M159	GTD	DAY; 11	DAY; 6	SEB; 4	ELK; 6	VIR; 3	ATL; 4	MOH; 2	CLT; 10	PET; 12	LGA; 9	SEB; 8		8th	245

* Season still in progress

=== Championships ===
==== Pirelli World Challenge ====
Year	Team	Co-Drivers	Car	Class
2006	(United States) Jon Groom Racing	N/A	Porsche 911 GT3	GT
2011	(United States) Compass360 Racing	N/A	Honda Civic Si	TC
2013	(United States) Blackdog Speed Shop	N/A	Chevy Camaro	GTS
2014	(United States) Blackdog Speed Shop	N/A	Chevy Camaro	GTS

==== IMSA Continental Tire Sports Car Challenge ====
Year	Team	Co-Drivers	Car	Class
2010	(United States) Compass360 Racing	David Tilenius	Honda Civic Si	ST
