= One Night Only (2026 film) =

2026 film by Will Gluck

- Theatrical release poster
- Directed by: Will Gluck
- Written by: Travis Braun
- Produced by: Will Gluck; Jacqueline Monetta
- Starring: Monica Barbaro; Callum Turner; Maya Hawke
- Cinematography: Yaron Orbach
- Edited by: Tia Nolan; Robert Nassau
- Music by: Este Haim; Christopher Stracey
- Production company: Olive Bridge Entertainment
- Distributed by: Universal Pictures
- Release dates: August 3, 2026 (SVA Theater); August 7, 2026 (United States)
- Running time: 102 minutes
- Country: United States
- Language: English
- Budget: $25 million
- Box office: $25.2 million

One Night Only is a 2026 American romantic comedy film directed and produced by Will Gluck from a screenplay by Travis Braun. Monica Barbaro and Callum Turner star, while Maya Hawke, Molly Ringwald, and LeVar Burton appear in supporting roles. The high-concept narrative follows two people who keep crossing paths on the one night a year when unmarried people are legally allowed to have sex.

The film premiered at the SVA Theater in Manhattan on August 3, 2026, and was released theatrically in the United States on August 7, 2026, by Universal Pictures. It received mixed reviews from critics, who praised the cast but criticized the execution of the premise. It was also a box-office bomb, grossing only $25.2 million against its $25 million production budget.

== Plot ==
Premarital sex has been outlawed in the United States for three years, with an exception for one night a year. The company Rexton Labs has given everyone wrist tattoos that change color for the 12-hour exemption period.

In New York City, Owen is the owner of a pizza shop who plans to use the exemption night to propose to his girlfriend Malika. However, when they meet at a sushi restaurant, she tells him of her intention to sleep with someone else that night in their apartment. Allie is a singer who does covers of songs for commercials. She plans to go out with her friend Jacinta to find partners with meaningful connection, but Jacinta quickly pairs off and leaves her.

Owen bemoans his breakup at his mother Linda's apartment, but Linda asks him to leave, as she has plans to spend the night with her partner, Rick. Owen and Allie meet briefly, bumping into each other outside Allie's apartment, but Owen vomits up the sushi he just ate, and they part.

Owen goes to a bar and strikes up a conversation with the bartender, who agrees to hook up with him after her shift is over. He runs around the neighborhood trying to find a condom, but they are sold out everywhere. Allie goes to a bar and rejects a few superficial suitors before connecting with a piano player who sings "All Out of Love" with her.

Allie and Owen both end up in the same bodega to buy the last available condom on display for $200. They team up to steal the condom, escape the bodega owner, and recover the condom from a sewer grate. However, Allie snatches it and departs with her date.

Owen connects with another potential partner on a dating app and meets her in Brooklyn Bridge Park, but she robs him of his possessions and clothes. Allie goes to her date's apartment, but the police arrive to arrest him on multiple charges of sex outside the exemption period. Allie and Owen run into each other at the police station and agree to temporarily team up to find partners after they overhear about a party. As they follow the partygoers, Owen tells Allie about his pizza shop, and Allie explains her tattoo of the Little Red Lighthouse.

Crashing the party, Owen attracts the attention of a wealthy woman named Vivian, and Allie encounters a musician she idolizes, Ezra Strong. Owen leads them in convincing Allie to overcome her stage fright and sing "Only You" on stage. Ezra brings Allie back to his recording studio, but his behavior ultimately turns her off and lands him in the hospital. Owen brings Vivian back to his mother's apartment, but Linda and Rick interrupt them, so Vivian storms off.

After taking Ezra to the hospital, Allie seeks out Owen's pizza shop, where Owen has also retreated. He makes a pizza for them to share. As they realize that they are starting to fall for each other, Owen receives a call from Malika, who has changed her mind and wants him to come home. Allie considers telling him to stay but ultimately says he should go to Malika.

With the sun coming up, Owen returns to Malika, but quickly realizes he has made a mistake. He goes to Allie's building but does not find her. When Allie returns home, she learns that Owen was looking for her. She finds him at the real Little Red Lighthouse. They go inside the lighthouse to have sex in the final minutes of the exemption, but ultimately decide to wait until next year so they can get to know each other.

One year later, Allie and Owen stay in together to have sex as the next exemption night begins.

== Cast ==
- Monica Barbaro as Allison "Allie" Miranda
- Callum Turner as Owen
- Maya Hawke as Malika, Owen's girlfriend
- Julia Fox as Skye, a bartender
- Charlie Gillespie as Ezra Strong, singer at the exclusive party
- Michelle Hurd as Detective Vanessa Bryan Brown
- King Princess as Jacinta, Allie's friend
- Quintessa Swindell as Arya, Allie's roommate
- Andrew Burnap as Max, the piano player
- Mike Birbiglia as Officer McAnnie
- Molly Ringwald as Linda, Owen's mother
- LeVar Burton as Rick, Linda's partner
- Okieriete Onaodowan as Tejan, a prince that Jacinta meets
- Pete Davidson as Detective Jeterson, an actor
- Bobby Cannavale as Detective Sannogale, an actor
- Nicholas Braun as Woodrow K. Mullhand, CFP
- Jay Ellis as Bernard Starks
- Ben Marshall as Patrick Brunson
- Roma Maffia as store owner
- Sydney Cole Alexander as Sophie, the honey pot in the park who robs Owen
- Ella Loudon as Vivian

Additionally, Este Haim and Ziwe play Aura and Bethia, respectively, bouncers at a nightclub. Radio Man and Flavor Flav have cameo appearances as fictionalized version of themselves.

== Production ==
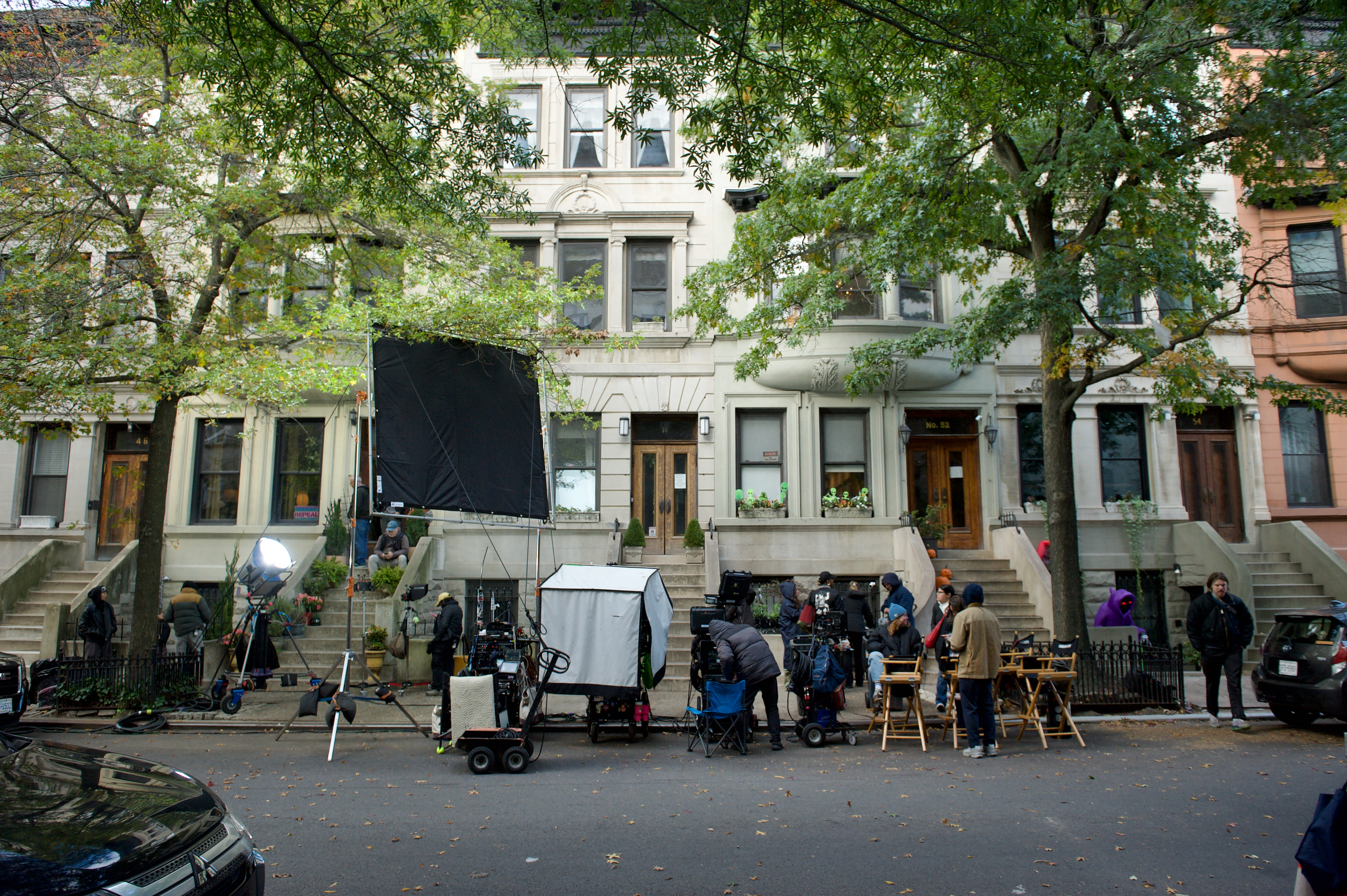
Production in Manhattan, October 2025

In February 2025, Universal Pictures announced that Will Gluck would be directing One Night Only, an original comedy written by Travis Braun that topped the 2024 Black List.

In August 2025, it was announced that Monica Barbaro and Callum Turner had joined the cast. Principal photography began on September 26, 2025, in New York City, with Radio Man joining the cast. Molly Ringwald and LeVar Burton joined the cast in October. In December 2025, it was revealed that Maya Hawke, Julia Fox, Este Haim, Ziwe, and King Princess had joined the cast.

Though Braun is the only credited screenwriter for the film, "Gluck directed One Night Only from his own script — a rewrite of an original from Travis Braun", according to Deadline's Matt Grobar. Gluck's uncredited rewrites included making Barbaro's character into a singer, as Gluck revealed in a 2026 interview with Rebecca Rubin of Variety, "I always rewrite the script completely once I have the actors. Once I cast Monica, I was like, 'She has to be a singer.' We talked for a long time, and she does have some stage fright, which is crazy, because she has the best voice. So I just wrote that for her. And I've always been obsessed with drug commercials, so it was this great confluence." Gluck previously stated that "we made a lot of changes to play to Callum and Monica's strengths and to make it very New York, because I'm a New Yorker tried and true, and I wanted it to feel like a real New York movie, so we had to make some changes organic to the locations."

Gluck also shared that he ended up cutting out almost all the sex and nudity from the film during editing because test audiences reacted negatively to it and he felt it distracted from the protagonist's love story.

The film's soundtrack was scored by Este Haim and Christopher Stracey. More than a full week before the film's theatrical release, the film's soundtrack was released as a three-song EP. The soundtrack features a medley track of the score by Haim and Stracey, a cover of John Paul Young's 1977 hit "Love Is in the Air" by King Princess, and the title track by New Radicals, their first new release in 28 years.

== Release ==
One Night Only premiered at the SVA Theater in New York City on August 3, 2026, and was released across the United States on August 7.

=== Home media ===
One Night Only was released on VOD on September 8, and on 4K UHD, Blu-ray, and DVD on October 20, 2026.

== Reception ==
=== Box office ===
The film made $5.5 million in its opening weekend, finishing in third place. The figure was "below expectations", with Erik Childress of Rotten Tomatoes saying: "For all the cries of the death of comedies in theaters, how many will lament when one as poorly reviewed as One Night Only is one of the rare entries into the genre we are getting this year... It opened to… Less than Jackass: Best and Last. Less than Universal's You, Me & Tuscany. Less than The Breadwinner. Less than even Melania." The film failed to rebound in its second weekend, falling 64% to $2 million.

Its four-week theatrical run concluded with total domestic earnings of $11.51 million.

=== Critical response ===
On the review aggregator website Rotten Tomatoes, 44% of 202 critics' reviews are positive, with an average rating of 5.3/10. The website's consensus reads: "Hampered by a high-concept premise that's full of red flags, One Night Only has charming moments thanks to its appealing stars but keeps killing the mood with world-building that prompts more questions than the script is willing to answer." Metacritic, which uses a weighted average, assigned the film a score of 42 out of 100, based on 36 critics, indicating "mixed or average" reviews. Audiences polled by CinemaScore gave the film an average grade of "B+" on an A+ to F scale.

Some critics wrote that the film's premise of a dystopia ruled by conservative capitalists was interesting and relevant to current events in the United States, but found that the implementation was nonsensical and distracting. Marya E. Gates of RogerEbert.com panned the film in a zero-star, thumbs down review, stating "If this is what it takes to get a rom-com greenlit these days, maybe we should just let them die. Death with dignity is surely a better fate for the genre than fascist capitulation." Gates added that the film's political satire, mostly kept to "a handful of references to the country's partisan political tension and 'single issue voters'...doesn't have a spine". Aisha Harris and Linda Holmes of NPR's Pop Culture Happy Hour voiced that although they welcome high-concept romantic comedies, One Night Only "did not need its high concept at all and doesn't do anything with it".

In a negative review, Kristen Lopez of The Film Maven wrote, "In a landscape where people are being urged to have children, Roe v. Wade is overturned and feminine contraceptive is being questioned at every turn", a film about a ban on premarital sex may have the potential to be funny, but as the film goes on, "the premise just becomes increasingly inept and shoddy". Adam Nayman of The Ringer commented, "Fusing prudishness to subversion and smugness to sincerity, One Night Only operates precisely and obliviously as the punch line to its own cautionary tale; it feints left and swipes right."

The A.V. Club's Monica Castillo commented, "Instead of sharing a laugh at the ridiculous pressure to have fun with every swipe, One Night Only has only one thing on its mind, and it's disappointingly much more traditional" than subversive. The Boston Globe's Odie Henderson stated the film's "ideas are outdated and, for a movie about casual sex, it's shockingly puritanical", while Benjamin Lee at The Guardian added "there's not enough smart or specific writing, from kids' TV writer Travis Braun, to justify why [the two leads] wouldn't just head to bed on first meet." Andrew Parker of The GATE wrote, "I laughed, and I admire the things that work, but this movie is an obvious mess that either wasn't thought through enough before it went to camera or it had too much cut from it along the way."

The Hollywood Reporter's David Rooney was more mixed, countering that "Luckily for director Will Gluck, who is tasked with turning this flimsy concept into fizzy fun, he has two charming leads in Monica Barbaro and Callum Turner." Lopez complimented the film's supporting cast, particularly Ringwald and Burton. In a positive review, Meredith Haggerty of The Verge wrote the film "is surprisingly amusing, though, if you can quiet your disbelief to only one to two cries of 'Really?? This??' per minute. The movie has sort of misfired David Wain energy, with some truly unexpected gags and pleasantly silly set pieces".
