= Will Gluck =

American film director and screenwriter

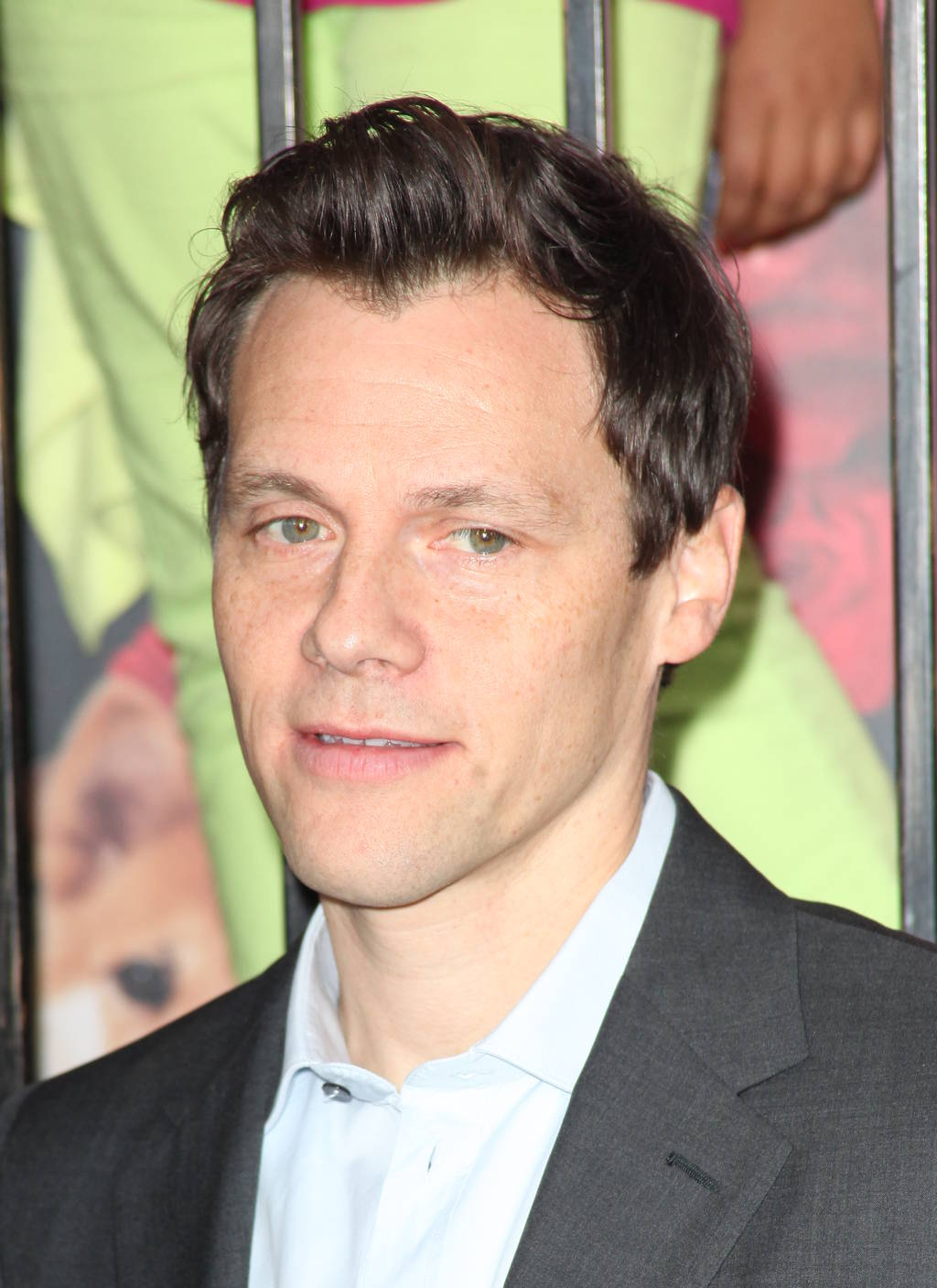
- Gluck in 2014
- Born: New York City, U.S.
- Education: Cornell University (BA)
- Occupations: Film director; screenwriter; producer; songwriter
- Years active: 1999–present
- Spouse: Trista Gladden
- Children: 2
- Parents: Peter L. Gluck; Carol Gluck

Will Gluck is an American film director, screenwriter, producer, songwriter and composer. He is best known for writing and/or directing the comedies Easy A (2010), Friends with Benefits (2011), Annie (2014 film) (2014), the Peter Rabbit films (2018–2021), Anyone but You (2023), and One Night Only (2026).

Gluck began his career in network television comedy, writing and producing for series including Grosse Pointe, Andy Richter Controls the Universe and The Loop, before moving into features with Fired Up! in 2009. Through his production company, Olive Bridge Entertainment, he has maintained first-look deals with Sony Pictures Entertainment for film and wiip for television, producing series for Hulu, Netflix, Disney+ and Comedy Central alongside his own directing work.

His 2023 romantic comedy Anyone but You opened to a modest $6 million weekend, became one of the most discussed box-office runs of the post-pandemic era, grossing more than $220 million worldwide. Its run drew extensive trade coverage of the commercial viability of the theatrical romantic comedy.

== Early life and education ==
Gluck was born in New York City. He is the son of the architect Peter L. Gluck and Carol Gluck, a Columbia University historian. Gluck graduated from Cornell University in 1993 with a major in Asian studies and a minor in English.

While at Cornell he founded the student theatre group Upstage Left, worked as a disc jockey at the campus radio station WVBR, and satisfied his senior thesis requirement by writing a play. He has spoken publicly about the value of a liberal arts education in his career, returning to Cornell in October 2015 as the Munschauer Career Series speaker.

== Career ==
=== Television (1990s–2000s) ===
After graduating, Gluck moved to Los Angeles and worked as a production assistant. He went on to write and produce for a string of critically well-regarded but short-lived network comedies: Working (TV series), Darren Star's Hollywood satire Grosse Pointe (TV series) (2000–01), and Andy Richter Controls the Universe (2001–02). He created the Fox sitcom Luis (TV series) (2003–04), starring Luis Guzmán, and co-created and produced The Loop (2006–07) with Pam Brady.

Gluck has said he likes to deconstruct genres and stories, and that he avoids reading coverage of his own work.

=== Transition to film (2009–2011) ===
Gluck made his feature directing debut with Fired Up! (2009), a cheerleading-camp comedy released by Screen Gems. Made for roughly $20 million, it grossed approximately $18 million worldwide and was a commercial disappointment.

His second film, Easy A (2010), was a commercial success. Working from a script by Bert V. Royal, on which he performed an uncredited rewrite, Gluck directed Emma Stone in her first leading role, supported by Stanley Tucci, Patricia Clarkson,Thomas Haden Church], Lisa Kudrow and Penn Badgley. A loose riff on Nathaniel Hawthorne's The Scarlet Letter filtered through the John Hughes teen-movie tradition, the film grossed about $75 million worldwide against a modest budget. It won the Critics' Choice Awards, and earned Stone a Golden Globes nomination.

Friends with Benefits (2011), which Gluck co-wrote, directed and produced, starred Justin Timberlake and Mila Kunis alongside Woody Harrelson, Richard Jenkins, Jenna Elfman, and Patricia Clarkson. The film grossed more than $150 million worldwide. Like Easy A, it has been described as taking a self-aware approach to genre convention, with characters commenting on the romantic-comedy tropes the film itself uses.

=== Annie, television and Peter Rabbit (2013–2021) ===
In 2013 Gluck co-created, directed and produced The Michael J. Fox Show, marking Michael J. Fox's return to series television. The NBC comedy launched to a first-week audience of roughly 16 million viewers and strong reviews, but was cancelled after one season in May 2014.

He directed and co-wrote Annie (2014), a contemporary reimagining of the stage musical, starring Quvenzhané Wallis, Jamie Foxx, Cameron Diaz, Rose Byrne and Bobby Cannavale. Produced by Gluck with Will Smith, James Lassiter and Jay-Z, the film was shot in New York City and grossed in the vicinity of $136 million worldwide. Reviews were mixed, but Gluck earned a Golden Globe nomination for Best Original Song as a co-writer of "Opportunity", shared with Sia and Greg Kurstin. That same year he served as a producer with Will Packer on About Last Night, starring Kevin Hart and Regina Hall.

Through Olive Bridge he also produced The McCarthys (2014–15), Moonbeam City (2015), Angry Angel (2017), the Disney+ series Encore! (2019–20), Hulu's Woke (2020–22), and Netflix's Sneakerheads (2020) and Chicago Party Aunt (2021–22).

Peter Rabbit (2018), a hybrid live-action/animated adaptation of the Beatrix Potter stories starring Rose Byrne and Domhnall Gleeson with the voices of James Corden, Margot Robbie, Daisy Ridley, Elizabeth Debicki and Sia, became Gluck's highest-grossing film, grossing $351 million worldwide. He co-wrote, directed and produced the sequel, Peter Rabbit 2: The Runaway, originally scheduled for early-2020 and delayed by the COVID-19 pandemic to a June 2021 release; it grossed $150 million.

=== Anyone but You (2023) ===
Anyone but You, which Gluck directed, produced and co-wrote with Ilana Wolpert from her original story, is a loose modern adaptation of Shakespeare's Much Ado About Nothing. Starring Sydney Sweeney and Glen Powell as antagonistic exes forced into a fake relationship at a destination wedding in Australia, it was produced for approximately $25 million and released by Sony on December 22, 2023.

It opened to roughly $6 million over three days and around $8 million across the Christmas corridor — conditions that normally presage a fast decline. Instead it held or grew week over week, reached number one domestically on its eighteenth day of release, and ultimately posted a domestic total more than fourteen times its three-day opening weekend. Worldwide gross reached roughly $240 million; Deadline described it as the highest-grossing R-rated romantic comedy worldwide since Bridget Jones's Baby (2016).

Trade coverage attributed the run to the Powell–Sweeney pairing, a TikTok marketing campaign that generated billions of hashtag views, and the revival of Natasha Bedingfield's 2004 single "Unwritten", used prominently in the film and over its end credits, which returned to streaming charts two decades after release. Gluck, who had joked before release that the film might be the last romantic comedy a major studio ever put in theatres, subsequently told CNBC that he would rather gamble on a mid- or low-budget film than a $200 million one, citing the pleasure of outperforming low expectations.

=== One Night Only (2026) ===
In February 2025, Universal Pictures announced that Gluck would direct One Night Only (2026 film), an original high-concept romantic comedy from a screenplay by Travis Braun, with Gluck performing an uncredited rewrite. Set in a lightly fictionalised New York under a federal mandate banning sex outside marriage except for a single sanctioned night each year, the film stars Monica Barbaro and Callum Turner, with Maya Hawke, Molly Ringwald, LeVar Burton, King Princess and Julia Fox in support; Sweeney and Powell appear in photo cameos. Shot in New York from September 2025 on a budget of about $25 million, it premiered at the SVA Theater on August 3, 2026 and opened nationwide on August 7.

Promoting the film, Gluck said test screenings led him to remove a substantial amount of nudity, arguing that contemporary audiences find explicit sex on screen distancing. He also coined the label "WOM-com" — for word-of-mouth comedy — to describe his approach after Anyone but You. Reviews were mixed, with several critics finding the dystopian premise tonally at odds with the romance; Variety's Guy Lodge called the result too unsettling to work as light comedy. The film grossed $25 million worldwide to date, failing to replicate Anyone but You's run.

== Olive Bridge Entertainment ==
Gluck founded Olive Bridge Entertainment, named for the hamlet of Olivebridge, New York in upstate New York, where he spent time growing up and where he was married. Based in Los Angeles, the company holds first-look deals with Sony Pictures Entertainment and wiip, and has produced for Netflix, Hulu, Disney+, Peacock, NBC, CBS and American Broadcasting Company.

Announced feature projects have included the buddy action comedy End of the World (Gluck directing, co-written with Chris Bremner), the science-fiction romance Move On, a hybrid animation/live-action The Aristocats for Walt Disney Pictures co-written with Keith Bunin, a Just Dance adaptation for Ubisoft and a 2026-announced adaptation of Lynn Painter's bestselling YA novel Fake Skating for Sony.

== Music ==
Gluck has written songs for his own films, credited in some instances under the pseudonym "Freedom Jones". He served as a lyricist and composer on Annie, receiving a Golden Globe nomination for "Opportunity" alongside Sia and Greg Kurstin. He has described a deliberate fondness for placing earnest, unfashionable pop songs in his films — a strategy that paid off conspicuously with "Unwritten" in Anyone but You.

== Style and reception ==
Critics have described Gluck's films as marked by rapid dialogue, a self-aware relationship to genre convention, prominent needle drops, and ensemble casts of established comic character actors surrounding young leads. Gluck has said that he likes to deconstruct genres and stories rather than execute them straightforwardly.

Gluck has argued publicly for mid-budget original theatrical comedy. He told CNBC in 2024 that studios have no inherent bias against romantic comedies and instead follow whatever has recently succeeded, and that the genre's migration to streaming had cost it the communal laughter of a cinema audience.

== Personal life ==
Gluck is married to Trista Gladden; the couple were married in Olive Bridge, New York. They have two daughters and live in Los Angeles

== Filmography ==
=== Film ===
Film credits
Year	Title	Director	Writer	Producer	Notes
2009	Fired Up!	Yes	Yes	Yes	
2010	Easy A	Yes	No	Yes	Uncredited rewrite
2011	Friends with Benefits	Yes	Yes	Yes	
2014	About Last Night	No	No	Yes	
2014	Annie	Yes	Yes	Yes	Also lyricist and composer
2018	Peter Rabbit	Yes	Yes	Yes	
2021	Peter Rabbit 2: The Runaway	Yes	Yes	Yes	
2023	Anyone but You	Yes	Yes	Yes	
2026	One Night Only	Yes	No	Yes	Uncredited rewrite

=== Television ===
Television credits
Year	Title	Role
1999	Working	Writer
2000–01	Grosse Pointe	Writer, producer
2001–02	Andy Richter Controls the Universe	Writer, producer
2003–04	Luis	Creator, writer, producer
2006–07	The Loop	Co-creator, producer
2013–14	The Michael J. Fox Show	Co-creator, director, producer
2014–15	The McCarthys	Executive producer
2015	Moonbeam City	Executive producer
2017	Angry Angel	Executive producer
2019–20	Encore!	Executive producer
2020	Sneakerheads	Executive producer
2020–22	Woke	Executive producer
2021–22	Chicago Party Aunt	Executive producer

== Awards and nominations ==
Awards and nominations
Work	Award	Category	Result
Easy A	16th Critics' Choice Awards	Best Comedy	Won
Easy A	37th People's Choice Awards	Favorite Comedy Movie	Nominated
Easy A	2011 Teen Choice Awards	Choice Movie: Romantic Comedy	Won
Easy A	2011 Comedy Awards	Comedy Director – Film	Nominated
Easy A	2011 Comedy Awards	Comedy Film	Nominated
Easy A	2011 Empire Awards	Best Comedy	Nominated
Easy A	22nd GLAAD Media Awards	Outstanding Film – Wide Release	Nominated
Friends with Benefits	38th People's Choice Awards	Favorite Comedy	Nominated
The Michael J. Fox Show	3rd Critics' Choice Television Awards	Most Exciting New Series	Won
The Michael J. Fox Show	40th People's Choice Awards	Favorite New TV Comedy	Nominated
Annie	72nd Golden Globe Awards	Best Original Song — "Opportunity"	Nominated
Peter Rabbit	2018 Teen Choice Awards	Choice Fantasy Movie	Nominated
Peter Rabbit 2	2021 AACTA Awards	Best Movie	Nominated
Anyone but You	49th People's Choice Awards	The Comedy Movie of the Year	Nominated
Anyone but You	35th GLAAD Media Awards	Outstanding Film – Wide Release	Nominated
