= Travis Braun =

American screenwriter and television producer

- Born: Ovalo, Texas, U.S.
- Education: Franklin College, Indiana
- Occupations: screenwriter; television writer; producer; showrunner
- Notable work: T.O.T.S., One Night Only, Pupstruction

Travis Braun is an American screenwriter and television writer, producer and showrunner. He created the Disney Junior animated series T.O.T.S. and Pupstruction and the Disney Channel live-action series Fast Layne. In feature work, he wrote the sex comedy Universal Pictures film One Night Only. He was the first writer in the history of The Black List to top the annual Hollywood survey of most-liked unproduced screenplays in two consecutive years, with Bad Boy in 2023 and One Night Only in 2024.

== Early life ==
Braun was born in Ovalo, Texas. He was home-schooled and grew up in a family involved in professional auto racing. His father Jeff Braun is a race engineer and his brother Colin Braun is a professional racing driver.

Travis studied journalism at Franklin College in Indiana, graduating summa cum laude. While pursuing his degree, he gained early experience working at USA Today and ABC World News Tonight. After relocating to Los Angeles, he began his entertainment career as a writer's production assistant on the CBS series Criminal Minds. Braun subsequently earned a spot in the highly competitive Nickelodeon Writing Program.

== Career ==
=== Television ===
Braun built an early career writing for children's and animated television. He created the Disney Junior series T.O.T.S. (2019) and Pupstruction (2023) and the Disney series Fast Layne (2019), and wrote for series including Muppet Babies, Vampirina and Monsters at Work. Vampirina received a Daytime Emmy nomination for Outstanding Writing in a Preschool Animated Program in 2018, which Braun shared with writers Chris Nee, Chelsea Beyl, and Jeffrey King.

=== Feature screenwriting ===
Braun's screenplay Dying for You appeared on the 2022 Black List. In 2023, his horror feature Bad Boy — about a rescue dog who suspects its new owner is a serial killer — topped the Black List. The following year, his romantic comedy One Night Only topped the 2024 Black List. The script was reviewed within the screenwriting press following its Black List ranking. Bad Boy was subsequently set up with Ke Huy Quan and Lili Reinhart attached.

In February 2025, Universal Pictures acquired One Night Only in an auction, with Will Gluck attached to direct and produce through his Olive Bridge Entertainment banner. Monica Barbaro and Callum Turner were set to star, and One Night Only was released on August 7, 2026. The film received mixed reviews from critics and debuted below expectations at the box office.

== Filmography ==
=== Film ===
Year	Title	Credit	Notes
2026	One Night Only	Written by	Universal Pictures

=== Television ===
Year	Title	Credit
2019	Fast Layne	Creator
2019	T.O.T.S.	Creator
2023	Pupstruction	Creator
Additional writing credits: Muppet Babies, Vampirina, Monsters at Work		
