= Pupstruction =

American animated television series

- Genre: Preschool; Musical
- Created by: Travis Braun
- Voices of: Yonas Kibreab; Carson Minniear; Scarlett Kate Ferguson; Mica Zeltzer
- Theme music composer: Rob Cantor
- Opening theme: "Pupstruction Theme" by the cast
- Ending theme: "Pupstruction Theme" (instrumental)
- Composers: Greg Nicolett; Rob Cantor
- Country of origin: United States
- Original language: English
- No. of seasons: 3
- No. of episodes: 74

Production
- Executive producers: Travis Braun; Victor Cook; Chris Prynoski; Shannon Prynoski; Ben Kalina
- Running time: 22 minutes (2 11-minute segments)
- Production company: Titmouse, Inc.

Original release
- Network: Disney Jr.
- Release: June 14, 2023 – present

Pupstruction is an American animated television series created by Travis Braun that debuted on Disney Jr. on June 14, 2023, in the USA. Produced by Titmouse, Inc., the series centers on the crew of a dog construction company. On January 13, 2023, five months prior to premiering, it was renewed for a second season, which premiered on October 14, 2024.

In February 2024, ahead of the second-season premiere, the series was renewed for a third season, which premiered on October 1, 2026. In June 2026, it was revealed that the third season would serve as the final one for the series, as most of the production crew have moved on to produce Cars: Lightning Racers.

== Premise ==
The Pupstruction crew are a group of dogs who fulfill construction projects around the city of Petsburg, sometimes at the request of Mayor Gillmore. They tend to different construction projects while contending with their foil the Lickety Split construction company led by Bobby Boots.

In late Season 3, starting with "Mountain of a Build", the crew's vehicles have been upgraded to become bigger than their original ones.

== Characters ==
=== Pupstruction Crew ===
- Phinny (voiced by Yonas Kibreab) is a 7-year-old Welsh corgi who is the captain and architect of the Pupstruction crew, the smallest, and youngest of the crew. His vehicle is a crane. Phinny's catchphrase is "Let's crank it up." Sometimes, Phinny will ride around on a bone-shaped skateboard. Whenever a character laments that some action cannot be done, Phinny would see it as a good idea, and make use of it.
- Tank (voiced by Carson Minniear) is an 8-year-old Neapolitan mastiff and the largest of the crew who supplies the materials for construction, enjoys different types of food, and has a soft spot for the cuddly animals. His vehicle is a dump truck. He takes his teddy bear named Squeakerton everywhere to help him feel brave and be less scared. Tank's catchphrase is "Ready to haul."
- Roxy (voiced by Scarlett Kate Ferguson) is a 9-year-old (later 10) rottweiler with walking wheels in place of her back legs who enjoys demolition and is the oldest and bravest of the crew. She's not scared of anything except the dark. Her vehicle is a wrecking ball/front loader hybrid. Roxy's catchphrase is "Let's crush this!"
- Luna (voiced by Mica Zeltzer) is an 8-year-old Old English sheepdog who does the digging operations. Her vehicle is a backhoe called Scoopy. Luna's catchphrase is "I dig it!" On occasion, Luna will end up chasing her tail who she names Mr. Tail. Also, she calls everyone Mr. and Mrs. in a formal name.

=== Recurring ===
- Maya (voiced by Grey DeLisle) is a dalmatian who is the mother of Phinny and Bailey and boss of the Pupstruction crew. She is bilingual as she speaks English and Spanish. Maya's vehicle is a helicopter. Her name is never mentioned in any episode plot.
- Harry (voiced by Eric Bauza) is a Welsh corgi who is the father of Phinny and Bailey. He's a chef who loves cooking food for his family and the Pupstruction Crew. Harry's vehicle is a food truck. He loves his son, but can be very overprotective at times to the point of worrying too much.
- Bailey (voiced by Alessandra Perez) is a 3-year-old toddler dalmatian who is Phinny's baby sister whose age hasn't been determined even though she celebrates her birthday in "Bailey's Birthday Coaster". She seems to enjoy construction just like her older brother and mother, but sometimes also enjoys demolition just like Roxy.
- Grandma Dee (voiced by Olga Merediz) is a dalmatian who is Phinny and Bailey's maternal grandmother, and the founder of Pupstruction. Her vehicle is a weathered pink dump truck. Grandma Dee built her own dump truck and taught some of her construction skills to Maya. It is mentioned that Grandma Dee built most of the buildings in Petsburg.
- Mayor Gilmore (voiced by Yvette Nicole Brown) is a goldfish who is the mayor of Petsburg and resides in a fishbowl. Her favorite color is purple. Mayor Gilmore is one of Pupstruction's most frequent callers.
  - Lloyd (voiced by Eric Bauza) is a gerbil who is Mayor Gilmore's personal assistant and helps to carry around Mayor Gilmore's fishbowl to different locations. He sometimes sends Pupstruction the locations of their builds.
- Bobby Boots (voiced by Bobby Moynihan) is a blue tabby cat who is the leader and manager of the Lickety Split construction team and the most frequently recurring antagonist in the series. He desperately wants his construction team to be great and admired, but his rushing style of doing things and incomplete builds is often a recipe for disaster. Bobby and the Lickety Split crew ride in the Destructo-Truck, which comes in handy for Bobby's plots. On occasion when he gets busted by Pupstruction for sabotage upon their completion of a project, Bobby will apologize for his actions.
  - Scratch and Sniff (voiced respectively by Kari Wahlgren and Eric Bauza) are Bobby's workers and henchmen. Scratch is a tall and slender calico cat with yellow eyes and a bandage on her tail while Sniff is a large and fat gray cat. They will at times come up with suggestions on how to do a better job, but Bobby always ignores them, just for close attention. Scratch and Sniff are often quite gullible, to the point where they sometimes accidentally expose Bobby's actions to the pups. Unlike their leader, they celebrate a successful build by Pupstruction and sometimes even celebrate with them, much to Bobby's dismay. Their names are a pun on scratch and sniff technology.
- Chilla Chill (voiced by Josh Banday) is a chinchilla rapper.
- Rusty Whiskers (voiced by Parvesh Cheena) is a hamster athlete.
- Pat (voiced by Jeff Bennett) is a pigeon who works as a mail carrier.
- Sofia Bonitelli (voiced by Melanie Minichino) is a white poodle and celebrity chef who owns a restaurant that Pupstruction built her.
- Professor Frazzle (voiced by Kari Wahlgren) is a cat who is Petsburg's residential scientist. She does various research and invents different objects that come in handy for Petsburg and the Pupstruction crew.
- Santa Paws (voiced by Fred Tatasciore) is a dog version of Santa Claus.
- PawPaw (voiced by Craig T. Nelson) is a gray Welsh corgi farmer who is Phinny and Bailey's grandfather and Harry's father.

== Episodes ==
=== Series overview ===
Season	Segments	Episodes	Originally released	
Season	Segments	Episodes	First released	Last released
1	49	25	June 14, 2023	July 17, 2024
2	50	25	October 14, 2024	September 5, 2025
3	50	25	October 1, 2026	December 3, 2026

=== Season 1 (2023–24) ===
No. overall	No. in season	Title	Storyboard directed by	Written by	Original release date	Prod. code	U.S. viewers (millions)
1	1	"Built to Build"	Josh Greer	Travis Braun	June 14, 2023	101	N/A
1	1	"Pup DE-struction"	David M. Rodriguez	Travis Braun	June 14, 2023	101	N/A
Built to Build: On Phinny's first day on the Pupstruction crew, the crew has to build a bridge across a river so children can go to school. Phinny doubts himself at first, but he is reminded by a Ferris Wheel made out of woofles that he made earlier that morning. That gives him an idea to move the old Ferris Wheel in Petsburg to the area where the bridge should've gone instead of building a bridge. The idea is so successful that Phinny is appointed the captain of Pupstruction the next day. Pup DE-struction: Mayor Gilmore asks the Pupstruction crew to build a skateboarding park for the children. When the crew goes over to the construction site that Lloyd sent them to, they see that a giant boulder is in the way. Roxy volunteers to destroy it. However, all her attempts to destroy the boulder fail. After none of the other crew members can move the boulder, Roxy realizes that Phinny was right when he told her earlier that demolition isn't always the answer to a problem with construction. The crew then decides to turn the boulder into part of the skateboarding park.
2	2	"Hush Puppies"	David M. Rodriguez	Niki Lytton	June 14, 2023	102	N/A
2	2	"Beach Day Build-Off"	Josh Greer	Robyn Brown	June 14, 2023	102	N/A
Hush Puppies: Pupstruction needs to build a new house for the Wagner family after Mr. and Mrs. Wagner have quadruplets. When they try to do construction where the Wagners' house used to be, the Wagners' next door neighbor, a chinchilla rapper named Chilla Chill, tells the crew to build quietly as he is trying to get some sleep before his concert later that evening. The Pupstruction crew tries to build without any loud noises, to no avail. When Harry brings pawnut (peanut) butter sandwiches to the crew, he suggests they build the house far away from the construction site; however, this fails too, but then Phinny, inspired by the pillow fort the Wagners made, decides to build a pillow fort around Chilla Chill's house so that he won't hear their noises. After they finish their house, Chilla Chill used the noises of construction as inspiration to write a new song and lets Pupstruction be in his show. Beach Day Build-Off: Pupstruction is at the beach, and Phinny is building sandcastles. Meanwhile, Bobby Boots looks at them. He decided to have a sandcastle building contest with Pupstruction, with Mayor Gilmore as the judge. Pupstruction's castle ends up looking better than Lickety-Split's castle, so Bobby decides to sabotage Pupstruction by using a device that makes waves to make a wave that destroys Pupstruction's castle. Thinking that he will instantly win because Pupstruction wouldn't have a castle to show Mayor Gilmore, he forgets to turn off the wave making device, making another wave that threatens to destroy his own castle. Pupstruction builds a splash shield for them, and both teams are declared winners much to the surprise of Bobby.
3	3	"Bailey's Birthday Coaster"	Josh Greer	James Eason-Garcia	June 15, 2023 (Note: These episodes were first released on Disney+ on June 14, 2023.)	103	N/A
3	3	"Doggone Tired"	David M. Rodriguez	Daka Hermon	June 15, 2023	103	N/A
Bailey's Birthday Coaster: It's Bailey's birthday and Phinny wants to build her a gift. Getting inspired by the fact that Bailey loves riding on his back, Phinny decides to build Bailey a roller coaster. He shows the coaster to her, but seeing Bailey dissatisfied, he tries to improve it, but Bailey's satisfaction does not change. After a while, Phinny makes the roller coaster in such a way that Bailey is too young to ride it. After Bailey takes another ride on Phinny's back, he realizes that all she wanted was to ride on his back. Pupstruction then moves their roller coaster to the pier of Petsburg. Doggone Tired: While Pupstruction is having dinner with Harry, Sofia Boneitelli, the most famous chef in Petsburg, visits Pup HQ, and tells Pupstruction that she accidentally invited everyone to the grand opening of her new restaurant, Bone Appetito, even though it hasn't been built yet. Boneitelli lets Tank hold onto her recipe book, which Tank stays up all night reading so he can decide what he wants to order from the restaurant. Since he didn't get any sleep, he is really tired, and because he doesn't think that it's a big problem, this leads him to cause problems for the Pupstruction crew. Tank eventually ends up ruining the recipe book by dropping it into wet cement. Luckily, he remembers the recipes in the book really well, and he is able to help save the restaurant.
4	4	"Fast and Furriest"	Josh Greer	Niki Lytton	June 16, 2023	104	N/A
4	4	"Luna Digs Deep"	David M. Rodriguez	Nick "Rocket" Rodriguez	June 16, 2023	104	N/A
Fast and Furriest: After fixing up their truck, Pupstruction decides to take it for a test drive, during which they come across Lickety-Split who built a faulty treadmill for Rusty Whiskers, an exercise-loving hamster. When the treadmill breaks, he ends up trapped in a runaway hamster ball, which Pupstruction repeatedly tries and fails to catch. Eventually, they decide to turn the hamster wheel into a car instead. Luna Digs Deep: Luna loves digging so much that she ends up digging during construction jobs where it's not necessary. She eventually loses all confidence in digging just when Mayor Gilmore calls the crew, complaining about a boulder on some train tracks, which obliges Pupstruction to build a tunnel under it.
5	5	"Bailey and the Doggy Doctor"	Josh Greer	James Eason-Garcia	June 23, 2023	105	N/A
5	5	"Dog for a Day"	David M. Rodriguez	Niki Lytton	June 23, 2023	105	N/A
Bailey and the Doggy Doctor: While Pupstruction is building the office for Dr. Barkley, Bailey is pretending to do construction until she gets a splinter from one of her wooden blocks. However, she is scared of having the splinter being taken out, so she tries to prevent Pupstruction from building Dr. Barkley's office, but Pupstruction decides to lessen Bailey's fears by adding a slide and ball pit to the roof of the doctor's office. Soon, Dr. Barkley eases Bailey by singing a song about how her doctor's tools are as important as Pupstruction's tools. Dog for a Day: Bobby is still jealous of Pupstruction's success. When Pupstruction gets a request from Mayor Gilmore to build a water park, Bobby decides to pretend to be a dog named Doggo and sneak into their headquarters so he could steal their plans and build the water park instead. He does things like make Pupstruction play fetch and secretly jammed the mechanism that enables them to launch their trucks. After Bobby makes off with the plans, he instructs Scratch and Sniff to build it. By the time Pupstruction unjams the mechanism, they arrive to find that Scratch and Sniff botched the construction. After being busted, Bobby apologizes for his actions and Pupstruction finishes the water park the right way.
6	6	"Adventures in Bulldozing"	David M. Rodriguez	James Eason-Garcia	June 30, 2023	106	N/A
6	6	"Safe and Hound"	Josh Greer	Denisse de la Cruz	June 30, 2023	106	N/A
Adventures in Bulldozing: Harry and Maya are going out to dinner by themselves, leaving Pupstruction to babysit Bailey. Roxy, wondering if babies like to smash things, decides to teach Bailey how fun demolition is; however, this soon blows up in her face as Bailey begins smashing everything and eventually goes into town to go on a smashing spree. This eventually leads to a part of the wall of the toy store breaking. Roxy soon fixes this problem by teaching Bailey that building after destroying is fun, and the crew turn the smashed part of the wall into a window display. Safe and Hound: Phinny hurts his paw when he accidentally drops Roxy's hammer on it, leading Harry to become concerned. While the Pupstruction crew is building a condo for a family of rabbits, Harry becomes Pupstruction's "safety inspector" and goes overboard on helping the pups be safer, doing things like replacing Luna's shovels with mixing spoons, making Roxy wear oven mitts to protect her hands, and making Tank use icing instead of cement. Eventually, this leads to the condo collapsing. When Maya arrives to survey the damage, she helps Harry realize that he might have gotten carried away with helping his son, and in turn, the crew, be safe, but Maya soon sings a song reminding Harry what being a crew is for.
7	7	"Home Stinky Home"	David M. Rodriguez	Becky Friedman	July 7, 2023	107	N/A
7	7	"Dump Truck Dilemma"	Josh Greer	Roxy Simons	July 7, 2023	107	N/A
Home Stinky Home: Tank's leftover and neglected kibble casserole has stunk up Pupstruction HQ causing Maya to call in the Squeaky Clean Crew to deal with it. As the stench is too much for the Squeaky Clean Crew, Pupstruction has no other choice but to tear it down and rebuild it. Maya provides Phinny with the original blueprints so that Pupstruction can make use of it. While working on a buildboard sign, Bobby, Scratch, and Sniff witness Pupstruction rebuilding the HQ as Bobby makes plans to sabotage their build by briefly swiping the blueprints and making his own alterations. Dump Truck Dilemma: Grandma Dee has come to town to see Maya and the rest of her family. She has brought with her a dump truck that has helped her in building most of Petsburg. Grandma Dee allows Pupstruction to play in her dump truck which she plans on using for a special project later. While in Grandma Dee's dump truck, a mirror accidentally comes off as Phinny and Tank try to use their tools to fix it. It doesn't go well as their tools fail to fix other things that fall off of the dump truck. Phinny and Tank enlist Roxy and Luna in keeping Grandma Dee busy while they work to fix the dump truck.
8	8	"Builders to Bakers"	Josh Greer	Niki Lytton	July 14, 2023	108	N/A
8	8	"Fire Truck Frenzy"	David M. Rodriguez	Story by : Jenava Mie; Teleplay by : Travis Braun	July 14, 2023	108	N/A
9	9	"Robo Cat"	David M. Rodriguez	Jenava Mie	July 21, 2023	109	N/A
9	9	"Underwater Pups"	Josh Greer	Todd Garfield	July 21, 2023	109	N/A
10	10	"The Wishbone Comet"	Josh Greer	Story by : James Eason-Garcia; Teleplay by : David Radcliff	July 28, 2023	111	N/A
10	10	"The Never-Ending Treehouse"	David M. Rodriguez	Niki Lytton	July 28, 2023	111	N/A
11	11	"Professor Frazzle"	Josh Greer	James Eason-Garcia	August 4, 2023	112	N/A
11	11	"A Crabby Neighbor"	David M. Rodriguez	Becky Friedman	August 4, 2023	112	N/A
12	12	"Luna's Bad Hair Day"	Josh Greer	Denisse de la Cruz	August 18, 2023	114	N/A
12	12	"Happy Maya's Day"	David M. Rodriguez	Sam Bissonnette	August 18, 2023	114	N/A
Luna's Bad Hair Day: Pupstruction has got a busy day of building, but Luna's hair is so long and covering her eyes, so their first build is a hair salon for Harvey Hare, and he can give her a trim. After they finished, Harvey sees Luna's hair and decides to give her a trim, but Luna gets scared and decide to continue construction. When they continue, her hair prevents her from building. So Pupstruction and Harvey decide to show her that getting a haircut is fun. Happy Maya's Day: It's Mother's Day. Pupstruction are making gifts for their mothers. Phinny decides to make Maya a woodworking shop, but his sister Bailey and his friends need help making their projects.
13	13	"Amusement Park-ing"	Josh Greer	Niki Lytton	September 22, 2023	115	N/A
13	13	"Dino-Dog Dig"	David M. Rodriguez	James Eason-Garcia	September 22, 2023	115	N/A
14	14	"Happy Howl-oween"	Josh Greer	Story by : Nick "Rocket" Rodriguez; Teleplay by : Scott Gray	September 27, 2023 (Note: This episode was released on Disney+ and DisneyNow the same day before its televised premiere.)	110	N/A
14	14	"The House of Howls"	David M. Rodriguez	Brandon Violette	September 27, 2023	110	N/A
15	15	"The Mayor Mover"	Josh Greer	Scott Gray	October 13, 2023	116	N/A
15	15	"Bobby's Balloon Blunder"	David M. Rodriguez	Story by : Niki Lytton; Teleplay by : Ellie Guzman	October 13, 2023	116	N/A
16	16	"Itty Bitty Barn Build"	Josh Greer	Niki Lytton	November 3, 2023	117	N/A
16	16	"A Colorful Job"	David M. Rodriguez	James Eason-Garcia	November 3, 2023	117	N/A
Note: On North American cable systems, "Itty" in "Itty Bitty Barn Build" is misspelled with an "S" instead of a "Y" as "Itts".
17	17	"Pupstruction Saves Christmas"	David M. Rodriguez	James-Eason-Garcia	November 27, 2023	119	N/A
17	17	"Pups On Ice"	Josh Greer	Niki Lytton	November 27, 2023	119	N/A
18	18	"The Sunniest Snow Day"	David M. Rodriguez	James Eason-Garcia	December 8, 2023	113	N/A
18	18	"When Pups Fly"	Josh Greer	Niki Lytton	December 8, 2023	113	N/A
The Sunniest Snow Day: During a hot day, Maya goes through different stuff. Inspired by a snow globe, Bailey wants to play in the snow. Because it's not the right season for it, Phinny leads the rest of Pupstruction to come up with a way so that Bailey can enjoy the snow. When Pups Fly: A bunch of bird traffic has caused Petsburg's bird community to keep bumping into each other. Mayor Gillmore enlists Pupstruction to build a special tower that can help direct traffic with Lloyd's brother Floyd becoming an air traffic controller. Bobby watches from nearby to see if Pupstruction will fail in building a tower to handle the air traffic.
19	19	"Valentine's Day Dogs"	David M. Rodriguez	Denisse de la Cruz	January 12, 2024	122	N/A
19	19	"The Petsburg Power-Out"	Josh Greer	James-Eason-Garcia	January 12, 2024	122	N/A
Valentine's Day Dogs: Valentine's Day is a busy day in Petsburg. Mayor Gilmore calls the crew that Pat the mail pigeon needs help sorting out the Valentine's Day cards at the post office. The Petsburg Power-Out: Petsburg has an emergency. The power is out due to the wind making a tree destroy the power station. But Roxy is afraid of the dark. Despite being so brave, she has to admit her fear of the dark to her friends before it gets the best of her.
20	20	"Pizza-struction"	Josh Greer	Scott Gray	February 2, 2024	118	N/A
20	20	"Baby Builders"	David M. Rodriguez	Denisse de la Cruz	February 2, 2024	118	N/A
21	21	"A Bright Idea"	Josh Greer	Roni Brown-Byrd	March 1, 2024 (Note: This episode was first released on Disney+.)	120	N/A
21	21	"The Friendliest Frog"	David M. Rodriguez	Denisse de la Cruz	March 1, 2024	120	N/A
A Bright Idea: While jogging, Mayor Gilmore and Lloyd find Captain Seadog in the middle of unsticking his boat from the rocks after crashing it in the dark. This causes Mayor Gilmore to call in Pupstruction to build a lighthouse so that Captain Seadog and other boaters can get out of the lake in the dark easily. As Pupstruction completes the lighthouse, they enlist Professor Frazzle to build a large lightbulb for the lighthouse which they had to maneuver safely around traffic, children playing baseball, and a wrecking ball during one of Lickety Split's gigs. Even when the lightbulb is put in, they still have to get more power to it by sunset. The Friendliest Frog: While on a walk, Mayor Gilmore and Lloyd find Petsburg's most friendliest citizen Felipe planning to move back to the rainforest as he can't handle the climate. To keep Felipe from moving away, Mayor Gilmore calls in Pupstruction to resolve this. They start with a pool to help cool him down. Then they put in some tropical plans to help with the shade. Then Pupstruction sets up a sprinkler which they had to turn off since the water has nearly flooded Mr. and Mrs. Wagner's yard. Now they must find a way to make Felipe's property to be more habitable to keep him from moving away.
22	22	"Pup Princess"	Josh Greer	Niki Lytton	April 5, 2024	121	N/A
22	22	"Trash Truck Pups"	David M. Rodriguez	Roxana Altamirano	April 5, 2024	121	N/A
23	23	"Pirate Party"	Josh Greer	Niki Lytton	May 3, 2024	123	N/A
23	23	"A Playful Playground"	David M. Rodriguez	Todd Garfield	May 3, 2024	123	N/A
24	24	"Mayor Boots"	Josh Greer	Niki Lytton	May 31, 2024	124	N/A
24	24	"Good Clean Race"	David M. Rodriguez	Nick Lopez	May 31, 2024	124	N/A
25	25	"The Petsburg Music Festival"	Josh Greer & David M. Rodriguez	Travis Braun	July 17, 2024	125	N/A

=== Season 2 (2024–25) ===
No. overall	No. in season	Title	Storyboard directed by	Written by	Original release date	Prod. code	U.S. viewers (millions)
26	1	"Saving Air Fish One"	Josh Greer	Niki Lytton	October 14, 2024	201	N/A
26	1	"Every Bunny on the Bus"	David M. Rodriguez	Travis Braun	October 14, 2024	201	N/A
Saving Air Fish One: Mayor Gilmore needs a place to land her plane, so Pupstruction builds an airport, buy Bobby Boots wants to build it first so he can be on the front page of the Petsburg Gazette. Every Bunney on the Bus: Pupstruction and Rusty Whiskers must figure out a way to fit every bunny on the bus, if the kids want to get to their first day of school on time.
27	2	"The Petsburg Car Show"	Josh Greer	Nick Lopez	October 14, 2024	202	N/A
27	2	"Pupstruction Camps Out"	David M. Rodriguez	Story by : Nick Lopez; Teleplay by : Robyn Brown	October 14, 2024	202	N/A
28	3	"Cheesestruction"	Josh Greer	Niki Lytton	October 15, 2024 (Note: These episodes were first released on Disney+ on October 14, 2024.)	203	N/A
28	3	"The Boat That Won't Budge"	David M. Rodriguez	Denisse de la Cruz	October 15, 2024	203	N/A
29	4	"Astro-Pups"	Josh Greer	Nick Lopez	October 16, 2024	204	N/A
29	4	"Twin Homes"	David M. Rodriguez	Roni Brown-Byrd	October 16, 2024	204	N/A
30	5	"The Funniest Pup In Petsburg"	David M. Rodriguez	Becky Friedman	October 17, 2024	205	N/A
30	5	"Beddy-Bye Build"	Josh Greer	Niki Lytton	October 17, 2024	205	N/A
31	6	"The Petsburg Express"	Josh Greer	Nick Lopez	October 25, 2024	206	N/A
31	6	"The Purrfect Hotel"	David M. Rodriguez	Roxana Altamirano	October 25, 2024	206	N/A
32	7	"Petsgiving at PawPaw's"	Josh Greer	Niki Lytton	November 1, 2024	215	N/A
32	7	"Chilly Dogs"	David M. Rodriguez	Denisse de la Cruz	November 1, 2024	215	N/A
33	8	"Murphy's Paw"	Josh Greer	Niki Lytton	November 8, 2024	211	N/A
33	8	"Pupstruction Saves the Dam"	David M. Rodriguez	Denisse de la Cruz	November 8, 2024	211	N/A
34	9	"Coast Guard Pup"	Josh Greer	Nick Lopez	November 15, 2024	210	N/A
34	9	"The Big Baby Build"	David M. Rodriguez	Jeffrey King	November 15, 2024	210	N/A
35	10	"A Very Merry Christmas"	Josh Greer	Nick Lopez	December 5, 2024	208	N/A
35	10	"Mountain Dogs"	David M. Rodriguez	Brandon Violette	December 5, 2024	208	N/A
36	11	"The Piggy Bank"	Josh Greer	Nick Lopez	December 20, 2024	212	N/A
36	11	"Magical Mischief"	David M. Rodriguez	Becky Friedman	December 20, 2024	212	N/A
37	12	"Construction Cowpups"	Josh Greer	Niki Lytton	January 17, 2025	213	N/A
37	12	"Foggy Doggies"	David M. Rodriguez	Denisse de la Cruz	January 17, 2025	213	N/A
38	13	"The Feel Better Mobile"	Josh Greer	Roni Brown-Byrd	January 24, 2025	214	N/A
38	13	"Roxy's Birthday Bash"	David M. Rodriguez	Nick Lopez	January 24, 2025	214	N/A
39	14	"Crably's Island"	Josh Greer	Nick Lopez	February 12, 2025	216	N/A
39	14	"The Petsburg Volcano"	David M. Rodriguez	Roxana Altamirano	February 12, 2025	216	N/A
40	15	"Luna and the Wishing Stone"	David M. Rodriguez	Jeffrey King	February 21, 2025 (Note: This episode was first released on Disney+ on February 12, 2025.)	218	N/A
40	15	"The Search for Catlantis"	Josh Greer	Nick Lopez	February 21, 2025	218	N/A
41	16	"The Egg-cellent Egg Hunt"	Josh Greer	Niki Lytton	March 21, 2025	217	N/A
41	16	"Adventure on Pupcake Mountain"	David M. Rodriguez	Denisse de la Cruz	March 21, 2025	217	N/A
42	17	"A Newsworthy Build"	Josh Greer	Niki Lytton	March 28, 2025	219	N/A
42	17	"Webigial's Web"	David M. Rodriguez	Denisse de la Cruz	March 28, 2025	219	N/A
43	18	"A Tree-mendous Build"	David M. Rodriguez	Niki Lytton	April 11, 2025	209	N/A
43	18	"Cave Pups"	Josh Greer	Denisse de la Cruz	April 11, 2025	209	N/A
44	19	"Built for Speed"	David M. Rodriguez	Denisse de la Cruz	May 9, 2025	221	N/A
44	19	"The Great Bridge Battle"	Josh Greer	Niki Lytton	May 9, 2025	221	N/A
45	20	"A Present for PawPaw"	David M. Rodriguez	Denisse de la Cruz	June 4, 2025	211	N/A
45	20	"Petsburg Falls"	Josh Greer	Niki Lytton	June 4, 2025	211	N/A
46	21	"Pet's Peak"	Josh Greer	Nick Lopez	July 4, 2025 (Note: This episode was first released on Disney+ on June 4, 2025.)	222	N/A
46	21	"Toolin' Around"	Davi M. Rodriguez	Jeffrey King	July 4, 2025	222	N/A
47	22	"The Petsburg Kite Festival"	David M. Rodriguez	Roxana Altamirano	July 18, 2025	220	N/A
47	22	"Muddy Buddies"	Josh Greer	Nick Lopez	July 18, 2025	220	N/A
48	23	"Monster Truck Pups"	David M. Rodriguez	Denisse de la Cruz	August 8, 2025	223	N/A
48	23	"Lickety Surprise"	Josh Greer	Niki Lytton	August 8, 2025	223	N/A
49	24	"Bootsy Boots"	Josh Greer	Nick Lopez	August 15, 2025	224	N/A
49	24	"Tennis Ball Trouble"	David M. Rodriguez	Nick Lopez	August 15, 2025	224	N/A
50	25	"Airdog Delivery"	David M. Rodriguez	Niki Lytton	September 5, 2025	225	N/A
50	25	"A Beary Big Build"	Josh Greer	Robyn Brown	September 5, 2025	225	N/A

=== Season 3 (2026) ===
No. overall	No. in season	Title	Storyboard directed by	Written by	Original release date	Prod. code	U.S. viewers (millions)
51	1	"Pumpkin Pups"	Tillie Sain	Niki Lytton	October 1, 2026	TBA	N/A
51	1	"Corn Dogs"	Josh Greer	Jeffrey King	October 1, 2026	TBA	N/A
Pumpkin Pups: After Bailey uses Professor Frazzle's ray gun to make her jack-o-lantern gigantic, she accidentally sends it on a rolling rampage across town. Corn Dogs: When Pupstruction is building a corn maze, Lickety Split tries to trap them inside to prevent the place from opening.
52	2	"Tank's Big Little Brother"	Tillie Sain	Nick Lopez	October 1, 2026	TBA	N/A
52	2	"Furball Frenzy"	Josh Greer	Niki Lytton	October 1, 2026	TBA	N/A
Tank's Big Little Brother: Tank's new giant-sized baby brother Champ causes problems for Pupstruction when he starts chewing on everything. Furball Frenzy: Pupstruction helps clean up Petsburg when fur balls take over on a windy day.
53	3	"Bailey's Lemonade Stand"	Josh Greer	Walinase J. Mbekeani	October 1, 2026	TBA	N/A
53	3	"Lights Out"	Tillie Sain	Jeffrey King	October 1, 2026	TBA	N/A
Bailey's Lemonade Stand: Lickety Split tries sabotaging Bailey's lemonade stand on a hot day in Petsburg. Lights Out: A shiny obsessed dog named Bandit hinders Pupstruction's efforts to replace all the streetlights in town.
54	4	"Petsburg River Run"	Josh Greer	Karen Wilmer-West	October 1, 2026	TBA	N/A
54	4	"Hopper Family Vacation"	Tillie Sain	Nick Lopez	October 1, 2026	TBA	N/A
Petsburg River Run: As Petsburg receives a lot of rain, Pupstruction uses it to help the farmers who need water for their plantations. Hopper Family Vacation: The Hopper clan is going on a family trip to a lake, but one of the children wants to bring a lot of personal things.
55	5	"The Glitter Express"	Josh Greer	Karen Wilmer-West	October 1, 2026	TBA	N/A
55	5	"Going Up!"	Tillie Sain	Jeffrey King	October 1, 2026	TBA	N/A
The Glitter Express: Bandit hijacks a train full of glitter meant to be used to fill up teddy bears for the kids of Petsburg. Going Up!: Lickety Split gets stuck in their own elevator when they're forced to work with Pupstruction on a new hotel near the boardwalk.
56	6	"Chime to Build"	Josh Greer	Jeffrey King	October 1, 2026	TBA	N/A
56	6	"Picky Parrot"	Tillie Sain	Elise Allen	October 1, 2026	TBA	N/A
Chime to Build: Bobby wrecks the town's clock tower to buy his crew more time to complete their merry-go-round. Picky Parrot: Bonetelli has Pupstruction make a kid-friendly, pirate-themed pizza place, but the kids won't try the food.
57	7	"Pup Bots"	Josh Greer	Karen Wilmer-West	October 1, 2026	TBA	N/A
57	7	"A Squeaky Situation"	Tillie Sain	Nick Lopez	October 1, 2026	TBA	N/A
Pup Bots: Pupstruction builds robot versions of themselves to deal with two playground jobs. A Squeaky Situation: Professor Frazzle's niece, Izzy, is working on a device that gives rubbery qualities to anything it zaps.
58	8	"Water Colors"	Josh Greer	Jeffrey King	October 1, 2026	TBA	N/A
58	8	"Sled Dogs"	Tillie Sian	Michael Goldberg	October 1, 2026	TBA	N/A
Water Colors: Chameleo requests a new home near the water to continue his painting, but the waves keep disrupting his work.
59	9	"Mow Problems"	Josh Greer	Nick Lopez	October 1, 2026	TBA	N/A
59	9	"Chicken Crossing"	Tillie Sain	Nick Confalone	October 1, 2026	TBA	N/A
Mow Problems: Pupstruction helps the local landscaper Joe mow every lawn in Petsburg after Professor Frazzle's new super seeds make them grow out of control.
60	10	"Lost and Luna"	Josh Greer	Jeffrey King	October 1, 2026	TBA	N/A
60	10	"Pies in the Sky"	Tillie Sain	Mia Resella	October 1, 2026	TBA	N/A
Lost and Luna: Luna digs herself deep underground after the crew restores the town's water supply. Pies in the Sky: Pupstruction builds an oven to help Banjo feed Petsburg city his pies.
61	11	"It Takes a Town"	Josh Greer	Nick Lopez	October 1, 2026	TBA	N/A
61	11	"Summer Lights"	Tillie Sain	Niki Lytton	October 1, 2026	TBA	N/A
It Takes a Town: Pupstruction recruits their neighbors for help in building a new neighborhood for new families. Summer Lights: Pupstruction struggles to come up with a plan to do a beginning of summer celebration all of Petsburg will love, including Murphy.
62	12	"Dollhouse Dogs"	Josh Greer	Jeffrey King	October 1, 2026	TBA	N/A
62	12	"Pupsicle Problems"	Tillie Sain	Becky Friedman	October 1, 2026	TBA	N/A
Dollhouse Dogs: Pupstruction is shrunken by Frazzle to construct a new dollhouse for Bailey. Pupsicle Problems: Bobby ruins the opening of Frosty Fred's new store in order to sell his chili to the citizens of Petsburg.
63	13	"Rock-a-Bye Baby"	Josh Greer	Nick Lopez	October 1, 2026	TBA	N/A
63	13	"The Big Birthday Splash"	Tillie Sain	Walinase J. Mbekeani	October 1, 2026	TBA	N/A
Rock-a-Bye Baby: A dog named Ziggy asks Pupstruction to help him rock out without disturbing the sleep of baby animals. The Big Birthday Splash: Bobby tricks Pupstruction into throwing a desert-themed party on Mayor Gillmore's birthday.
64	14	"Mountain of a Build"	Josh Greer	Nick Lopez	October 19, 2026	TBA	N/A
64	14	"Ferry Tails"	Tillie Sain	Brandon Violette	October 19, 2026	TBA	N/A
Mountain of a Build: When Lickety Split drills through the snowy mountain so they could get seats for a snow race event, their travel method causes the mountain to collapse, and it is up to Pupstruction to rebuild it. Ferry Tails: Pupstruction must figure how to get campers to an island campsite.
65	15	"Pawnut Butter Jelly Time"	Josh Greer	Jeffrey King	October 20, 2026	TBA	N/A
65	15	"Can't Stop the Hop"	Tillie Sain	Caroline Hayes	October 20, 2026	TBA	N/A
Pawnut Butter Jelly Time: Pupstruction and Lickety Split build tall factories for two rivaling entrepreneurs. Can't Stop the Hop: Pupstruction constructs a home for a young frog whose jumps destroy pretty much anything he touches.
66	16	"Surf Pups"	Josh Greer	Nick Lopez	October 21, 2026	TBA	N/A
66	16	"The Breakfast Build"	Tillie Sain	Karen Wilmer-West	October 21, 2026	TBA	N/A
Surf Pups: Pupstruction builds a surfing school for a skilled surfer to teach anyone interested in the activity. The Breakfast Build: Pupstruction builds a diner for a cook whose waffles are increasing in popularity.
67	17	"The Super Slip and Slide"	Josh Greer	Jeffrey King	October 22, 2026	TBA	N/A
67	17	"Runaway Wrecking Ball"	Tillie Sain	Michael Goldberg	October 22, 2026	TBA	N/A
The Super Slip and Slide: Pupstruction installs a water slide at a playground so a young turtle can play with his faster-moving friends. Runaway Wrecking Ball: While replacing a damaged shelf at a library, Roxy, who is addicted to her new vehicle, brings the demolition car in the building, but the wrecking ball breaks off and rolls all over Petsburg.
68	18	"Dino Disaster"	Josh Greer	Nick Lopez	October 23, 2026	TBA	N/A
68	18	"Teapup Party"	Tillie Sain	Elise Allen	October 23, 2026	TBA	N/A
Dino Disaster: Bobby uses technology to give four dinosaur skeletons the gift of movement, but him losing two controllers result in the bones running amok in the city. Teapup Party: Bailey wants hold a tea party, but her destructive spin move caused by her excitement serves as an obstacle to the builder pups who are trying set up props for the occasion.
69	19	"The Big Mooove"	Josh Greer	Jeffrey King	November 9, 2026	TBA	TBD
69	19	"The Great Juice Boost"	Tillie Sain	Rachel Reuben	November 9, 2026	TBA	TBD
The Big Mooove: Pupstruction tries to build a home for a bovine mother and daughter. The Great Juice Boost: Pupstruction constructs a factory for a juice vendor whose beverages are high in demand.
70	20	"Bobby Steals Mother's Day"	Josh Greer	Nick Lopez	November 10, 2026	TBA	TBD
70	20	"Sky High Build"	Tillie Sain	Karen Wilmer-West	November 10, 2026	TBA	TBD
Bobby Steals Mother's Day: While Pupstruction builds a flower shop, Bobby tries to take all the flowers to give to his mother as a Mother's Day gift. Sky High Build: Pupstruction attempts to build a home for a goat who wants to live on the domy summit of a high mountain.
71	21	"Pirate Playground"	Josh Greer	Jeffrey King	November 11, 2026	TBA	TBD
71	21	"The Doodle House"	Tillie Sain	Nida Chowdhry	November 11, 2026	TBA	TBD
72	22	"Karate Kitties"	Josh Greer	Nick Lopez	November 12, 2026 (Note: This episode was first released on Disney+ on November 11, 2026.)	TBA	TBD
72	22	"The Long Haul"	Tillie Sain	Karen Wilmer-West	November 12, 2026	TBA	TBD
Karate Kitties: Pupstruction tries to build a dojo, but their materials get destroyed by karate students who would use anything to practice on. The Long Haul: Tank thinks nothing is too heavy for his vehicle to carry alone until he attempts to deliver an entire school while moving up a steep mountain.
73	23	"Pups on the Moon"	Josh Greer	Jeffrey King	November 13, 2026	TBA	TBD
73	23	"Too Many Toys"	Tillie Sain	Nick Lopez	November 13, 2026	TBA	TBD
Pups on the Moon: Fuzz Aldrin takes Pupstruction to the Moon to build a lunar observatory. Too Many Toys: Pupstruction builds a larger store for a retailer who accidentally ordered far more toys than intended.
74	24	"Sleighstruction Ho-Ho-Ho"	Josh Greer	Nick Lopez	December 3, 2026	TBA	TBD
74	24	"The Great Gingerbread Build"	Tillie Sain	Niki Lytton	December 3, 2026	TBA	TBD
75	25	"Bailey's First Build"	Josh Greer	Brandon Violette	November 20, 2026	TBA	TBD
75	25	"Bobby's Nice Try"	Tillie Sain	Niki Lytton	November 20, 2026	TBA	TBD
Note: While this is not the final episode to air, this episode is the series finale in terms of continuity.

== Release ==
Pupstruction premiered on Disney Jr. and Disney Channel on June 14, 2023. It was later released on the Disney+ streaming service. The second season premiered on October 14, 2024, and the next day on Disney+. The third and final season premiered on October 1, 2026, and the next day on Disney+.

== Reception ==
=== Critical response ===
The series received positive reviews from critics. Victoria Davis of Animation World Network said, "The show's overall tone is humorous and fun, but the messages Braun and his team hope to relay to kids are very serious, especially considering the show is speaking to a generation where kids have access to almost every toy and electronic mechanism under the sun that could keep them distracted for long periods of time. And yet, kids still want to play with the wrapping paper more than the toy wrapped inside. Pupstruction nurtures that "imaginative play" part of being a kid that could be lost in today's society if we're not careful." Ashley Moulton of Common Sense Media gave Pupstruction a grade of four out of five stars, complimented the depiction of educational value, stating that the show highlights teamwork and perseverance, and praised the presence of positive messages and role models, citing helpfulness, writing, "Pupstruction is a sweet, appealing preschool series that's appropriate for the youngest viewers."

=== Accolades ===
Pupstruction was nominated for Preschool Programming – Best New Series at the 2024 Kidscreen Awards.
