= Fast Layne =

- Genre: Comedy
- Created by: Travis Braun
- Starring: Sophie Pollono; Sofia Rosinsky; Brandon Rossel; Winslow Fegley
- Theme music composer: Jordan Powers; Jintae Ko
- Opening theme: "Just Wanna Go" by Rayla
- Composer: Bert Selen
- Country of origin: United States
- Original language: English
- No. of seasons: 1
- No. of episodes: 8

Production
- Executive producers: Matt Dearborn; Tom Burkhard; Brian Hamilton
- Producer: Ian Hay
- Production locations: Maple Ridge, British Columbia, Canada
- Cinematography: Neil Cervin
- Camera setup: Single-camera
- Running time: 22–23 minutes
- Production company: Lakeshore Productions

Original release
- Network: Disney Channel
- Release: February 15 – March 31, 2019

Fast Layne is an American comedy television series created by Travis Braun that aired on Disney Channel from February 15 to March 31, 2019. The series stars Sophie Pollono, Sofia Rosinsky, Brandon Rossel, and Winslow Fegley.

== Premise ==
In the town of Cedarville, Layne Reed is a brilliant girl whose parents Cheryl and Rob are away so her aunt came to her house to watch over her. While working in a school campaign against her rival Jasper Marr at Cedarville Middle School, she and her friend Zora Morris stumble upon an intelligent car named VIN who is pursued by some people led by Kwon and Riggins. When Layne gets her DNA sequenced with VIN, she becomes the car's operator.

== Cast and characters ==
=== Main ===
- Sophie Pollono as Layne Reed, a brilliant girl who discovers VIN in her parents shed while running for school president
- Sofia Rosinsky as Zora Morris, Layne's homeschooled neighbor and best friend
- Brandon Rossel as Cody Castillo, a boy from school who works at a garage and Layne's love interest
- Winslow Fegley as Mel, Layne's cousin who is trying to find out what Layne and Zora are up to

=== Recurring ===
- Nate Torrence as the voice of VIN, an intelligent car who was created by Layne's parents and his name is short for Vehicle Integrated Neurotech
- Diana Bang as Kwon, a scientist and former co-worker of Cheryl at Salton Flats Technical Command Center who targets VIN after she was kicked off the project for having plans to weaponize VIN
- Enid-Raye Adams as Cheryl, a scientist and mother of Layne who works for the government at Salton Flats Technical Command Center
- David Milchard as Rob, a scientist and father of Layne who works for the government at Salton Flats Technical Command Center
- Michael Adamthwaite as Riggins, the accomplice of Kwon who targets VIN
- Caitlin Howden as Aunt Betty, the aunt of Layne and mother of Mel who is enlisted to watch over Layne while Cheryl and Rob are away.
- Reese Alexander as Principal Mugbee, the principal of Cedarville Middle School
- Ty Consiglio as Jasper, a boy who is Layne's rival in Cedarville Middle School's school election

=== Notable guest stars ===
- Anna Cathcart as Anna, a classmate of Layne
- Adrian Petriw as Alonzo, the sentient wristwatch worn by Layne that notifies her of the things on her schedule

== Production ==
The series was originally reported in 2017 as a reboot of the Herbie franchise in development for Disney XD; created by Travis Braun, and to be executive produced by Zeke and Luther's Matt Dearborn and Tom Burkhard. The project was later green-lit as a limited series for Disney Channel titled Fast Layne on March 9, 2018, without any reference to the Herbie works. The series comes from Lakeshore Productions. The production's director is Hasraf Dulull, while Brian Hamilton and Travis Braun serve as additional executive producers and Ian Hay serves as producer. Braun also created the series.

It was filmed in Maple Ridge, British Columbia, in the Greater Vancouver area; production began on February 19, 2018, with the final day of filming scheduled for April 27, 2018. The series had a special premiere on Disney Channel on February 15, 2019, immediately following the premiere of the live-action Kim Possible film, before settling in its regular timeslot, starting February 17, 2019. The series comprises eight episodes.

== Episodes ==
No.	Title	Directed by	Written by	Original release date	Prod. code	U.S. viewers (millions)
1	"Mile 1: The Voice in the Shed"	Hasraf "Haz" Dulull	Travis Braun	February 15, 2019	101	0.93
While her parents Cheryl and Rob are away, Layne Reed stays with her Aunt Betty and her cousin Mel. As she works on her school campaign against Jasper Marr, she and her neighbor Zora discover a talking car named VIN in Aunt Betty's shed. When he is activated and takes them on a drive, Layne works out the controls of VIN as they work to avoid a group of people led by Kwon and Riggins. Guest stars: Nate Torrence as the voice of VIN, Diana Bang as Kwon, Enid-Raye Adams as Cheryl, David Milchard as Rob, Michael Adamthwaite as Riggins, Caitlin Howden as Aunt Betty, Reese Alexander as Principal Mugbee, Ty Consiglio as Jasper
2	"Mile 2: Paid to Drive"	Hasraf "Haz" Dulull	Tom Burkhard	February 17, 2019	102	0.56
When VIN's control unit has been damaged and wanting to access the information on who created him, Layne and Zora work to raise money to obtain the part from Cody. While using VIN for a transportation job, Layne and Zora get the most unlikeliest of customers in Kwon and Riggins. Guest stars: Nate Torrence as the voice of VIN, Diana Bang as Kwon, Enid-Raye Adams as Cheryl, David Milchard as Rob, Michael Adamthwaite as Riggins, Caitlin Howden as Aunt Betty, Ty Consiglio as Jasper
3	"Mile 3: VIN Goes Wild"	Joe Menendez	Matt Dearborn	February 24, 2019	103	0.49
Upon discovering that Cheryl and Rob have built VIN, Layne works to remain focus for her next stage in the school campaign...even if one of VIN's antics nearly affects it. Meanwhile, Kwon arrives at the Salton Flats Technical Command Center that Cheryl and Rob work at. Guest stars: Nate Torrence as the voice of VIN, Diana Bang as Kwon, Enid-Raye Adams as Cheryl, David Milchard as Rob, Michael Adamthwaite as Riggins, Caitlin Howden as Aunt Betty, Reese Alexander as Principal Mugbee, Ty Consiglio as Jasper, Anna Cathcart as Anna, Adrian Petriw as Alonzo
4	"Mile 4: Changing Laynes"	Joe Menendez	Alex Ankeles & Morgan Jurgenson	March 3, 2019	104	0.44
Zora takes Mel on a hiking trip to keep him from figuring out about VIN. When Zora and Mel get stuck on a ledge, Layne has no choice but to bring Cody in her work to keep the truth about VIN a secret and rescue them. Meanwhile, Kwon continues her visit to the Salton Flats Technical Command Center as Cheryl and Rob meet with Colonel Hardy to talk about the development of VIN. Guest stars: Nate Torrence as the voice of VIN, Diana Bang as Kwon, Enid-Raye Adams as Cheryl, David Milchard as Rob, Caitlin Howden as Aunt Betty, Ty Consiglio as Jasper, Anna Cathcart as Anna
5	"Mile 5: Road Trip"	Rachel Leiterman	Travis Braun	March 10, 2019	105	0.53
At Cedarville Middle School, Layne finds that her locker has been stolen and suspects that Jasper did it to sabotage her. In order to find it, Layne, Zora, and VIN go on a road trip to Morgantown which leads to VIN accidentally taking a female biker's dog along and also leading to their next encounter with Kwon and Riggins. Meanwhile, Mel wants to repay Cody for helping to rescue him from the ledge. Guest stars: Nate Torrence as the voice of VIN, Diana Bang as Kwon, Enid-Raye Adams as Cheryl, David Milchard as Rob, Michael Adamthwaite as Riggins, Reese Alexander as Principal Mugbee, Ty Consiglio as Jasper
6	"Mile 6: Code Orange"	Rachel Leiterman	Laurie Parres	March 17, 2019	106	0.43
Now that Cheryl and Rob know that VIN has come in contact with Layne and Zora and have returned home, they now declare VIN off limits to them. Layne struggles with the final parts of the school election. Meanwhile, Mel meets VIN and finds out that Cheryl and Rob are going to decommission VIN under Colonel Hardy's orders as part of the mysterious "Code Orange." He frees VIN to warn Layne about it. Guest stars: Nate Torrence as the voice of VIN, Enid-Raye Adams as Cheryl, David Milchard as Rob, Reese Alexander as Principal Mugbee, Anna Cathcart as Anna, Ty Consiglio as Jasper
7	"Mile 7: On the Run"	Hasraf "Haz" Dulull	Molly Haldeman & Camilla Rubis	March 24, 2019	107	0.61
After Layne and Zora fake VIN's destruction, they hide him in the woods as he suspects that he has become a burden to Layne. While Cheryl, Rob, and Colonel Hardy get suspicious of VIN's destruction, so do Kwon and Riggins. Meanwhile, Zora takes a special exam at Cedarville Middle School that was given to her by Principal Mugbee. Cody tries to tell Layne how he feels for her at the advice of his grandfather. The results for the school election are in. Guest stars: Nate Torrence as the voice of VIN, Diana Bang as Kwon, Enid-Raye Adams as Cheryl, David Milchard as Rob, Michael Adamthwaite as Riggins, Reese Alexander as Principal Mugbee, Anna Cathcart as Anna, Ty Consiglio as Jasper
8	"Mile 8: Helicopter Parents"	Hasraf "Haz" Dulull	Matt Dearborn & Tom Burkhard	March 31, 2019	108	0.55
Kwon and Riggins have captured Cheryl and Rob and demand the surrender of VIN. While Layne does her first duties as school president with Jasper as her vice-president, VIN contacts Kwon and states that he is surrendering to them. Upon hearing Mel answer his call from a secure line prior to him stowing away in VIN, Colonel Hardy leads the military to Cedarville. After VIN surrenders, Kwon keeps Cheryl and Rob as her captives since she needs them to help weaponize VIN. This was something she was unable to do when she was kicked off the project. Following a note from VIN, Layne, Zora, and Cody get a ride to Cedarville Airport where Mel meets up with them. Having snuck into VIN, the four of them work to rescue Cheryl and Rob who Kwon and Riggins are herding into their helicopter. Their associates in the blacks vans leave when Colonel Hardy and the military arrive. Using a grappling hook, VIN snares their helicopter overloading it enough for them to make an emergency landing. Kwon and Riggins are subdued by Cheryl and Rob and then arrested by the military. After Layne introduces herself to Colonel Hardy, he is pleased with VIN's performance. Cheryl and Rob would like VIN to make a decision about working for the government. VIN states to Colonel Hardy that he will work with the government as soon as he learns more facts from his new family. Colonel Hardy states that he will be in touch. Later that night, Layne is directed to the shed where her friends and family celebrate her win in the school election. In the final scene, Layne and Zora are alerted by VIN that someone is hacking into him. Guest stars: Nate Torrence as the voice of VIN, Diana Bang as Kwon, Enid-Raye Adams as Cheryl, David Milchard as Rob, Michael Adamthwaite as Riggins, Caitlin Howden as Aunt Betty, Reese Alexander as Principal Mugbee, Ty Consiglio as Jasper

== Ratings ==
Viewership and ratings per season of Fast Layne
Season	Episodes	First aired		Last aired		Avg. viewers (millions)
Season	Episodes	Date	Viewers (millions)	Date	Viewers (millions)	Avg. viewers (millions)
1	8	February 15, 2019	0.93	March 31, 2019	0.55	0.57
