= Colin Braun =

American racing driver (born 1988)

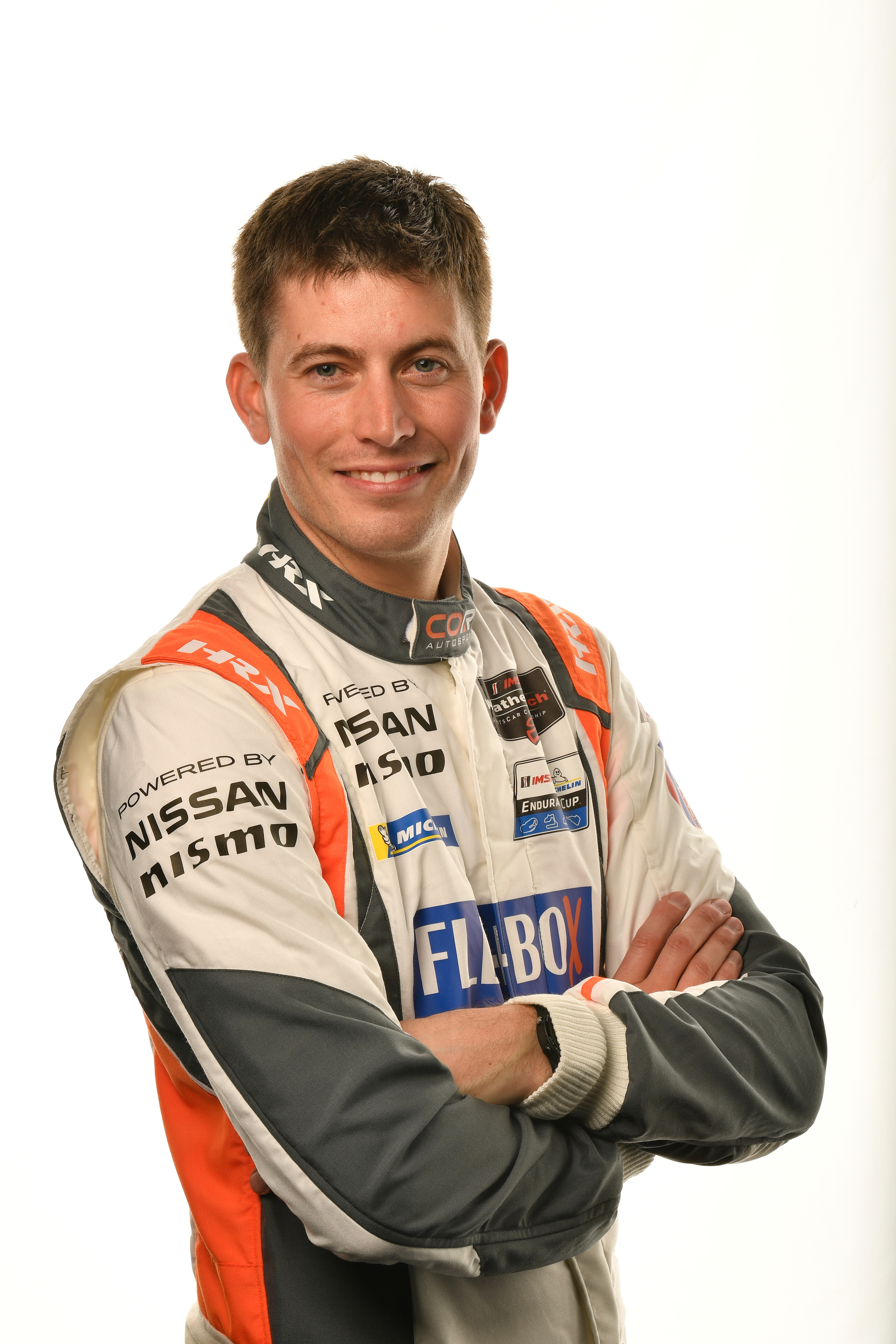
- Braun in 2022
- Nationality: (United States) American
- Born: September 22, 1988 (age 38) Ovalo, Texas, U.S.

WeatherTech SportsCar Championship career
- Debut season: 2014
- Current team: CrowdStrike Racing by APR
- Categorisation: FIA Gold
- Car number: 04
- Former teams: DragonSpeed; Era Motorsport; Performance Tech Motorsports; CORE Autosport; Meyer Shank Racing with Curb-Agajanian
- Starts: 107
- Championships: 3
- Wins: 19
- Poles: 9
- Fastest laps: 7
- Best finish: 1st in 2014, 2015, 2022

IndyCar Series career
- 1 race run over 1 year
- Best finish: 40th (2024)
- First race: 2024 Grand Prix of St. Petersburg (St. Petersburg)
| Wins | Podiums | Poles |
|---|---|---|
| 0 | 0 | 0 |

NASCAR O'Reilly Auto Parts Series career
- 31 races run over 4 years
- 2010 position: 23rd
- Best finish: 23rd (2010)
- First race: 2007 Sam's Town 250 (Memphis)
- Last race: 2010 Ford 300 (Homestead)
| Wins | Top tens | Poles |
|---|---|---|
| 0 | 6 | 2 |

NASCAR FedEx Freight Truck Series career
- 56 races run over 5 years
- 2026 position: 41st
- Best finish: 5th (2009)
- First race: 2007 Kroger 200 (Martinsville)
- Last race: 2026 Team EJP 175 (New Hampshire)
- First win: 2009 Michigan 200 (Michigan)
| Wins | Top tens | Poles |
|---|---|---|
| 1 | 25 | 5 |

ARCA Menards Series career
- 3 races run over 1 year
- Best finish: 51st (2007)
- First race: 2007 Gateway ARCA 150 (Gateway)
- Last race: 2007 ARCA Re/Max 250 (Talladega)
| Wins | Top tens | Poles |
|---|---|---|
| 0 | 3 | 0 |

Previous series
- 2024 2007, 2011–2013 2005–2013 2012 2007–2010 2007–2011 2007: IndyCar Series; American Le Mans; Rolex Sports Car Series; Pirelli World Challenge; Nationwide Series; Camping World Truck Series; ARCA Racing Series

Championship titles
- 2014–2015, 2022: WeatherTech SportsCar Championship (PC) & (LMP3)

Awards
- 2008: NASCAR Craftsman Truck Series Rookie of the Year

Colin James Braun (/braʊn/ "brown"; born September 22, 1988) is an American racing driver. He is the 2014 and 2015 WeatherTech SportsCar Championship Prototype Challenge Champion and currently drives the No. 60 Meyer Shank Racing Acura ARX-06 for Meyer Shank Racing in the IMSA WeatherTech SportsCar Championship. Driving the ARX-06, he was part of the winning team of the 2023 24 Hours of Daytona. He formerly competed in the NASCAR Craftsman Truck Series and the Xfinity Series. He lives in Charlotte, North Carolina.

== Early life ==
Braun was born in Ovalo, Texas. He grew up in a family involved in professional auto racing. His father Jeff Braun is a race engineer and his brother Travis Braun is a screenwriter.

== Racing career ==
Braun started out his racing career at the age of six, racing quarter midgets. At the age of eight, he went international, competing for factory kart racing teams in countries such as Monaco, Spain, France, and Japan. At the age of fourteen, he moved to cars, winning championships in Formula Renault TR 1600 and Formula TR 2000 Pro Series.

=== 2006–2007 ===
At the age of sixteen, Braun was part of the Team 16 squad and made his road racing debut in the Rolex 24 at Daytona with a Porsche 996 GT3, teammate to future NASCAR driver Brad Coleman. Braun made history as the youngest Daytona Prototype driver at th age of seventeen, driving an Essex Racing Ford Crawford. In 2006, he joined Krohn Racing's No. 75 team, teaming with Jörg Bergmeister. Braun became the youngest winner of a major auto race on North American soil with his win at the Brumos Porsche 250 in Daytona. Due to the Master Settlement Agreement, he was barred from participating in three races but still finished fourth in points while Bergmeister won the overall championship. He also became the youngest driver to stand on the podium at the 24 Hours of Le Mans with a second-place finish in his class in a Ferrari F430. He stayed on with Krohn for 2007, but was teamed with Max Papis. The team ended up in the top five in points, despite Braun being suspended for an incident at the Crown Royal 200 at Watkins Glen International.

In 2007, Braun signed a driver development contract with Roush Fenway Racing. Braun made his stock car debut in the ARCA RE/MAX Series race at Gateway International Raceway, where he finished 13th. Braun later made his NASCAR debut in the Camping World Truck Series (was Craftsman Truck Series), driving the No. 50 RSC Equipment Rental Ford for Roush Fenway. He was running in the top-twenty before a flat tire sent him into the wall and a 34th-place finish. He would also drive the No. 16 3M Ford at the Sam's Town 250 where he had a thirtieth-place finish. In November 2007, he was announced as the full-time driver of the No. 6 Ford, succeeding Travis Kvapil.

=== 2008–2011 ===
Braun assumed full-time duties in 2008 in the Camping World Truck Series, driving the No. 6 Con-way Ford F-150 with veteran crew chief Mike Beam. He earned three top-five and eight top-ten finishes, and won the Raybestos Rookie of the Year award. Braun became the sixth Roush Fenway Racing driver to claim the rookie title in the truck series. He also made five Nationwide Series starts including one top-five finish and two poles.

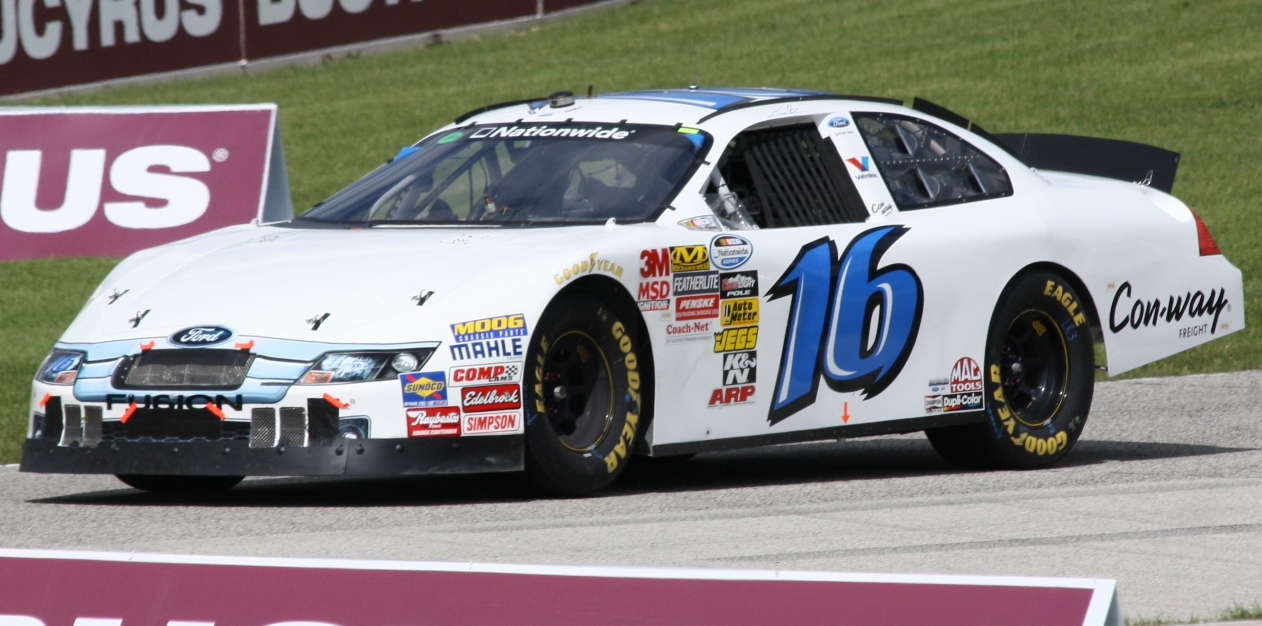
Braun's 2010 Nationwide car

After turning a lap of 177.441 mph on Thursday evening in qualifying to earn his first career Camping World Truck Series Pole award, Braun led the field to the green flag Friday night at Daytona International Speedway for the 2009 season opener. He led the first 10 laps of the race, fell as far back as fifteenth and with luck, in the end, Braun crossed the finish line in ninth place to score his ninth career top-ten. On June 13, he scored his one and only career Truck Series win at Michigan.

In 2010, Braun was promoted to the Nationwide Series, and Con-way would be his sponsor for eighteen races. However, by midseason, Braun was removed from the No. 16 car in certain races in which they did not have a sponsor, but returned to the No. 16 car in races when Con-way is the sponsor. Braun had a tough rookie year in the Nationwide Series, making 24 starts with five top-tens but also had seven DNFs. Braun was released by Roush on December 1 after Roush's Nationwide program turned its focus to getting sponsorship for Carl Edwards, Trevor Bayne, and Ricky Stenhouse Jr.

Braun joined Robertson Racing in the American Le Mans Series for part of the 2011 season. Braun returned to NASCAR with Billy Ballew Motorsports, driving their No. 51 Ford at Michigan.

=== 2012–2013 ===
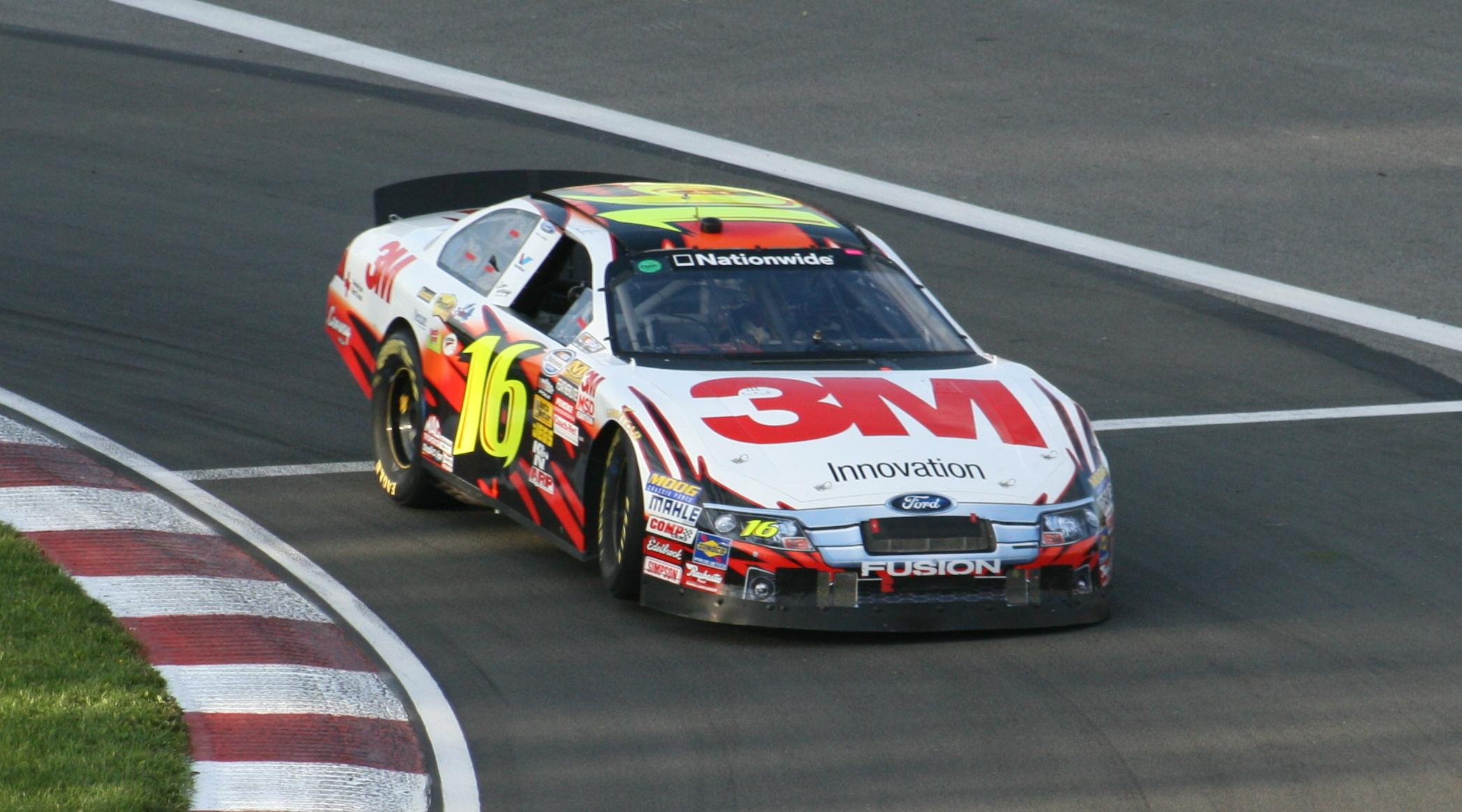
Braun at Circuit Gilles Villeneuve

On January 21, 2012, he announced that he wouldn't compete in NASCAR during the 2012 season, but would drive for CORE Autosport in the 2012 American Le Mans Series season. Partnered with team owner Jon Bennett, Braun helped CORE win the ALMS Prototype Challenge Class Teams Championship. Braun also joined the Kia Racing team as part of Kinetic Motorsports Pirelli World Challenge GTS Class No. 38 Kia Optima entry. After four races, where he was able to achieve two podium finishes, Braun was replaced by Mark Wilkins following an incident with his teammate, Michael Galati, at Miller Motorsports Park.

Braun partnered with Bennett for the first two races of the 2013 Rolex Sports Car Series season running with Doran Racing in a Ford Dallara to gain insight into the Daytona Prototype category. Braun returned to CORE autosport for the full 2013 American Le Mans Series season, competing in the Prototype Challenge class. After driving the No. 05 with Bennett for the first eight races, Braun switched to the team's GT entry, driving the No. 06 Porsche 911 GT3 RSR with Porsche factory driver Patrick Long. As a result of the late-season switch, Braun finished fifth in the PC Drivers' Championship, but made significant contributions to CORE's 2013 PC Team Championship by scoring five podium finishes (including two wins) with Bennett.

On October 9, 2013, Braun joined Michael Shank Racing at Daytona International Speedway to set a new speed record on the track's oval course using a Rolex Sports Car Series Daytona Prototype car, powered by a twin-turbocharged Ford V-6 engine; the existing record was 210.364 miles per hour (338.548 km/h), set in 1987. Braun broke the record, setting a fastest single lap at a speed of 222.971 miles per hour (358.837 km/h).

In 2013, Braun began coaching Team CrowdStrike in the NARRA Radical Cup Series to many wins and an overall championship.

=== 2014–present ===
2014

Braun returned to CORE autosport in 2014, in the new United SportsCar Championship, driving the No. 54 PC car with Bennett. He and co-drivers Bennett, James Gué and Mark Wilkins won the season-opening Rolex 24 at Daytona in the PC class followed by the 12 Hours of Sebring. Braun and Bennett went on to win races at Kansas Speedway and Watkins Glen International, propelling them to the 2014 PC Drivers' Championship and PC Team Championship as well as the newly created Tequila Patrón North American Endurance Cup. Braun received the TOTAL Pole Award for winning more PC pole positions than any other driver.

2015

Braun and Bennett's success continued into 2015, where once again they claimed the PC Driver Championship in conjunction with CORE's PC Team Championship.

2016

Braun returned to CORE autosport in 2016, racing with Bennett in the IMSA WeatherTech SportsCar Championship PC class. The team's first win came at Sebring with Braun, Bennett and Mark Wilkins behind the wheel. Braun passed Tom Kimber-Smith with 23 minutes remaining and won by a margin of 1.283 seconds. The team posted three wins at Sebring, Laguna Seca, and Canadian Tire Motorsports Park. They also posted two second-place finishes at Detroit and Road America.

Braun also made his Global Rally Cross (GRC) debut with CORE autosport in 2016.

2017

In 2017, IMSA eliminated the PC class and Braun moved to the GTD class in a Porsche GT3R with CORE autosport and co-driver Bennett.

Braun also returned to GRC Lites competition for CORE autosport.

2018

The CORE autosport team moved into the Prototype class in IMSA competition, with Braun and Bennett driving an LMP2-spec car. The team began the season with a second-place finish at the Rolex 24 and posted back-to-back wins at Canadian Tire Motorsports Park and Road America. They also posted two more podiums at Watkins Glen and Laguna Seca. Braun also scored poles at Watkins Glen and Canadian Tire Motorsports Park. At CTMP he ran a quick time of 1:06.315, bettering the previous track record (a 1:08.459 by Ricky Taylor) by over two seconds. As the only private, non-factory funded team, Braun and Bennett finished the 2018 season just four points shy of the overall IMSA Championship.

In 2018, Braun joined forces with George Kurtz and his team, CrowdStrike Racing for Pirelli World Challenge racing. Braun raced the two-driver SprintX format with Kurtz in the No. 04 CrowdStrike/GMG Racing Audi R8.

2019

In November 2018, CORE autosport announced they would not race the ORECA 07-Gibson in the LMP2 class in 2019. Instead, they would make the switch to IMSA WeatherTech SportsCar Championship's DPi class in a Nissan Onroak DPi with drivers Braun and Bennett. Braun and Bennett combined with Loic Duval and Romain Dumas to finish fourth at the Rolex 24 Hour race to start off the year. In July, Braun broke his previous track record at Canadian Tire Motorsports Park with a lap at 135.250 mph. It was an IMSA track record and less than a second off the all-time track record set by Marco Werner in a diesel-powered Audi R10 in 2007. Mid-way through the 2019 season, Bennett announced he would be retiring leaving Braun to look for other opportunities.

In February, CrowdStrike announced it would partner with DXDT Racing, where the duo of Braun and Kurtz would drive the No. 4 Mercedes-AMG GT3 in the GT World Challenge America competition. They posted two podium finishes on the year.

2020

In December 2019, DragonSpeed announced that Braun would join its 10Star entry for the Rolex 24 At Daytona on January 25–26. Braun would join co-drivers Henrik Hedman and Ben Hanley in the LMP2-class ORECA 07-Gibson. Braun helped the team win their second-consecutive LMP2 victory at the Rolex 24 At Daytona. Following the win, Era Motorsports announced it had signed Braun to assist with the remaining three endurance races – the 12 Hours of Sebring, Six Hours of The Glen, and Petit Le Mans.

Bennett announced his retirement at the end of the 2019 IMSA season. After a year off, the team announced in late 2020 that it would field a Ligier JS P320 in the new-for-2021 LMP3 class in IMSA with drivers Bennett and Braun. IMSA adopted the LMP3 class as a way to bolster car count.

Braun also joined George Kurtz and the CrowdStrike Racing team in GT World Challenge's GT3 Pro-Am class. The two posted eight podium finishes on the season, including three wins. They finished the season with wins at Virginia International Raceway (VIR), Road America, and at the Indianapolis Motor Speedway. The duo also partnered with driver, Ben Keating to take a second win at Indianapolis in the Pro-Am class in the Intercontinental GT Challenge's Indianapolis 8-Hour race after driving in both wet and dry conditions. Braun and Kurtz finished the season second in the overall Pro-Am Drivers Championship. Braun and Kurtz also made their debut in the Total 24 Hours of Spa as part of SPS Automotive Performance's lineup for the Belgian endurance race. It marked Braun's first career start at the race.

2021

CORE autosport announced at the end of 2020, after a one-year hiatus, the team would enter IMSA's new LMP3 class at the start of 2021. Braun was once again tapped as Bennett's co-driver. The LMP3 class requires a Pro-Am lineup with Braun filling Pro duties and Bennett filling Am duties. It was also announced that George Kurtz and Matt McMurry would join the duo for the four endurance races. The team's first win of the year came at The 12 Hours of Sebring as Braun and Bennett combined with Kurtz for the win. The win made Braun and Bennett three-time winners at the 12-hour endurance race. Road America marked the team's second win of season snapping Riley Motorsports three-race win streak. Braun won by more than 22 seconds over the No. 38 Performance Tech Motorsports team. Long Beach wasn't on the schedule for the LMP3 class so Braun made a one-off GT Daytona (GTD) start for Scuderia Corsa in its Ferrari 488 GT3 with co-driver, Daniel Mancinelli. The start marked Braun's first GTD start since 2017.

Braun announced he would join George Kurtz in the No. 04 DXDT Mercedes-AMG GT3 for Fanatec GT World Challenge America Series competition marking their fourth year together as co-drivers. The duo posted four podium finishes and wins at Circuit of the Americas (COTA) and Virginia International Raceway (VIR).

2022

Braun returned to IMSA competition with CORE autosport in the LMP3 class for 2022. It was announced that George Kurtz would join Colin and co-driver Jon Bennett for the endurance races. In his seventeenth consecutive Rolex 24 start, Braun, crossed the finish line third in his final stint of the 24 Hour race to give the team a podium finish at the 60th running of the race in Daytona Beach, FL. The duo of Braun and Bennett would collect five podium results on the year including two wins at Mid-Ohio and Canadian Tire Motorsports Park (CTMP). The win at CTMP marked the duo's fifth win at the track. With the help of Kurtz, the team finished fifth in the final race of the year at Road Atlanta but were crowned IMSA LMP3 champions. This marked the third IMSA championship for Braun and Bennett.

Braun returned to CrowdStrike Racing in 2022 to pilot the No. 04 CrowdStrike Racing/AWS machine for the fourth consecutive year in GT3 competition. The team partnered with Riley Motorsports for the 2022 season. Sharing driving duties with George Kurtz, the team amassed three wins starting with NOLA Motorsports Park. Their win in Saturday's race launched them into the championship point lead. They continued their winning ways at Virginia International Raceway (VIR), rebounding to win on Sunday after a hard-luck race on Saturday. At Watkins Glen, the duo earned the overall win on Sunday by 3.962 seconds over second place. To close out the 2022 season, Braun partnered with CrowdStrike Racing and Riley Motorsports to win the 25 Hours of Thunderhill with co-drivers Kurtz, Matt McMurry, and Felipe Fraga in an LMP3.

In November 2022, Bennett announced he would be closing CORE autosport. On the heels of that announcement, it was announced that Braun would join the Meyer Shank Racing (MSR) roster for the 2023 IMSA WeatherTech SportsCar Championship season. Braun would co-drive with Tom Blomqvist for the team's full-season Acura LMDh program. The MSR team claimed the 2022 IMSA DPi championship and would look ahead to a new era of IMSA competition in the hybrid-powered GTP class.

2023

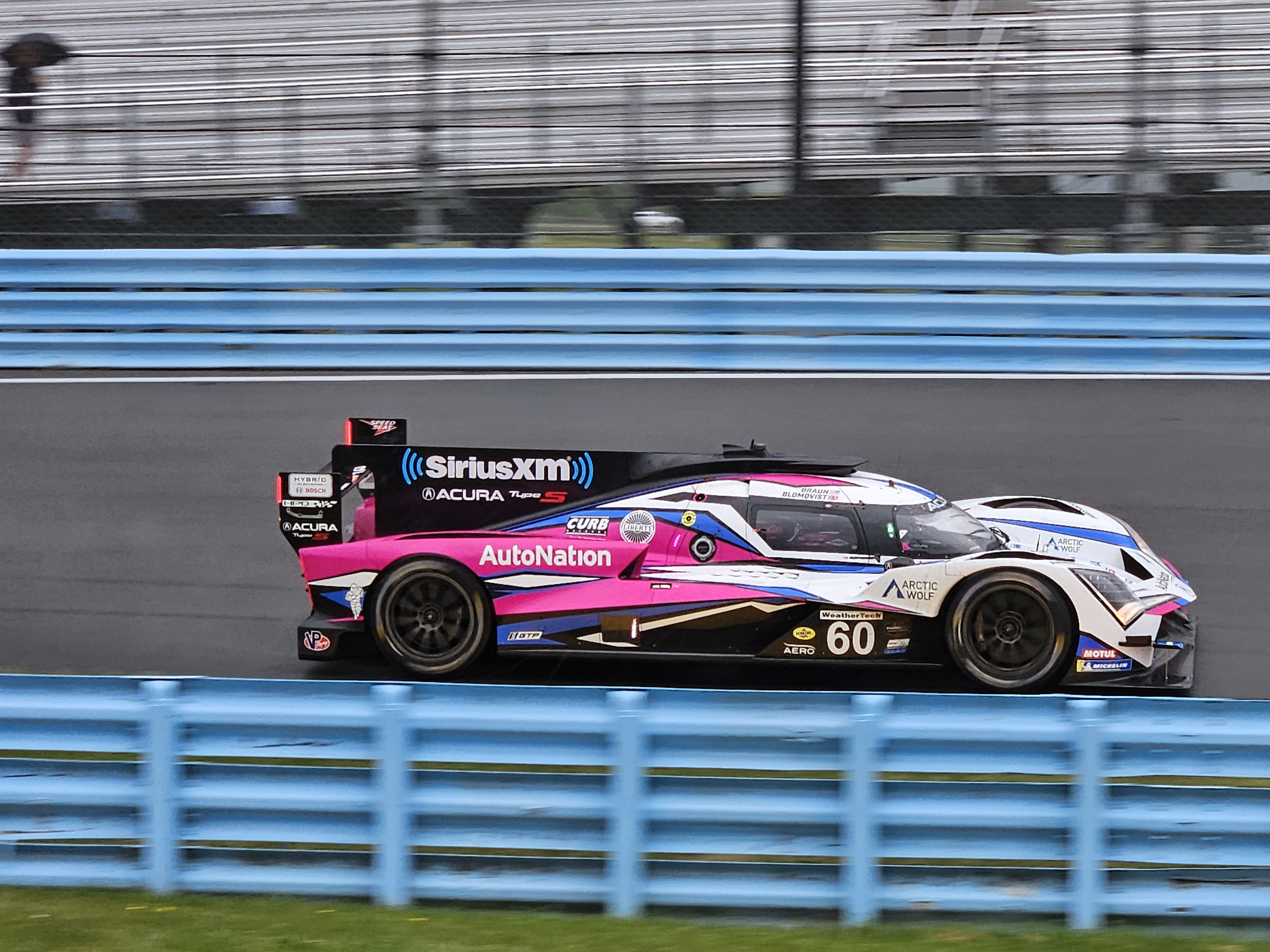
The No. 60 Acura ARX-06 of Braun and Blomqvist at the 2024 Sahlen's Six Hours of The Glen

The 2023 season kicked off at the Roar Before the Rolex 24, with Braun making his first appearance with Meyer Shank Racing (MSR). Colin started the weekend by logging the fastest lap time in the first session (1:35.635). Then, during the fourth test session, Colin clocked the fastest lap time (1:35.038) in the No. 60 Acura ARX-06. The MSR team claimed the 2023 pole award as Braun's co-driver, Tom Blomqvist, drove the hybrid-powered Acura ARX-06 during the 15-minute session. The 61st running of the Rolex 24 saw the debut of the Grand Touring Prototype (GTP) era. Meyer Shank Racing with regular drivers Braun and Tom Blomqvist and additional drivers Helio Castroneves and Simon Pagenaud combined to give the team its second Rolex 24 victory in as many seasons. After 24 hours, the No. 60 Acura ARX-06 crossed the line 4.190 seconds ahead of second place. The win marked Braun's fourth Rolex 24 class win and first overall win. Colin won the 2014 Rolex 24 in the PC Class with CORE autosport and then in 2020, captured the LMP2 win as one of four drivers for DragonSpeed USA. He also combined with CORE autosport in 2018 to win the Trueman Pro-Am Team Endurance class.

==== 2024 ====
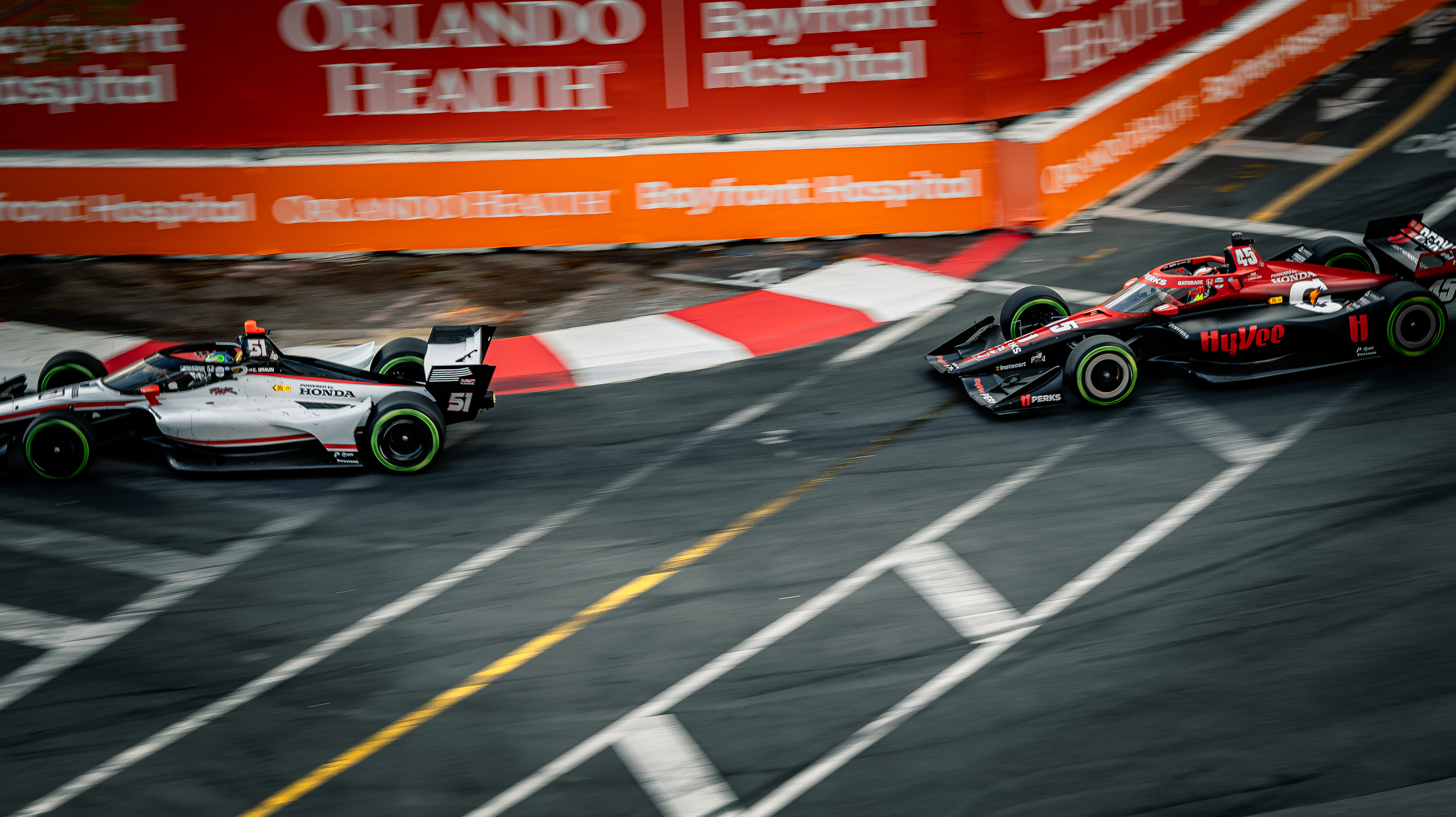
Braun defending from Christian Lundgaard at the 2024 Firestone Grand Prix of St. Petersburg

For 2024, Braun made his debut in the IndyCar Series after being signed to drive for Dale Coyne Racing for the Grand Prix of St. Petersburg and the non-championship Thermal Club $1 Million Challenge.

== Motorsports career results ==
=== Stock car career summary ===
| Season | Series | Team | Races | Wins | Top 5 | Top 10 | Points | Position |
|---|---|---|---|---|---|---|---|---|
| 2007 | ARCA Re/Max Series | Roush Fenway Racing | 3 | 0 | 1 | 3 | 595 | 51st |
| 2007 | NASCAR Craftsman Truck Series | Roush Fenway Racing | 1 | 0 | 0 | 0 | 61 | 109th |
| 2007 | NASCAR Busch Series | Roush Fenway Racing | 1 | 0 | 0 | 0 | 73 | 137th |
| 2008 | ARCA Re/Max Series | Roush Fenway Racing | 0 | 0 | 0 | 0 | 0 | N/A |
| 2008 | NASCAR Craftsman Truck Series | Roush Fenway Racing | 25 | 0 | 3 | 8 | 2856 | 13th |
| 2008 | NASCAR Nationwide Series | Roush Fenway Racing | 5 | 0 | 1 | 1 | 515 | 63rd |
| 2009 | NASCAR Camping World Truck Series | Roush Fenway Racing | 25 | 1 | 9 | 14 | 3338 | 5th |
| 2009 | NASCAR Nationwide Series | Roush Fenway Racing | 0 | 0 | 0 | 0 | 0 | N/A |
| 2010 | NASCAR Nationwide Series | Roush Fenway Racing | 24 | 0 | 0 | 5 | 2374 | 23rd |
| 2011 | NASCAR Camping World Truck Series | Billy Ballew Motorsports | 2 | 0 | 0 | 1 | 60 | 50th |
| 2020 | ARCA Menards Series | GMS Racing | 0 | 0 | 0 | 0 | 0 | N/A |
| 2026 | NASCAR Craftsman Truck Series | Kaulig Racing | 3 | 0 | 0 | 2 | 68 | 41st |

=== 24 Hours of Daytona results ===
| Year | Team | Co-drivers | Car | Class | Laps | Pos. | Class Pos. |
|---|---|---|---|---|---|---|---|
| 2005 | (United States) The Racer's Group | (Canada) Ross Bentley (United States) Adrian Carrio (United States) Brad Coleman (United States) Kevin Buckler | Porsche 996 GT3 Cup | GT | 650 | 17th | 7th |
| 2006 | (United States) Krohn Racing | (United States) Tracy Krohn (Sweden) Niclas Jönsson (Germany) Jörg Bergmeister | Riley Mk. XI-Pontiac | DP | 717 | 5th | 5th |
| 2007 | (United States) Krohn Racing | (Italy) Max Papis (Finland) JJ Lehto | Riley Mk. XI-Pontiac | DP | 615 | 17th | 11th |
| 2008 | (United States) AIM Autosport | (United States) Brian Frisselle (Canada) Mark Wilkins (Canada) Andrew Ranger | Riley Mk. XI-Ford | DP | 448 | DNF | DNF |
| 2009 | (United States) Michael Shank Racing | (South Africa) Mark Patterson (Brazil) Oswaldo Negri Jr. (United States) Ryan Hunter-Reay | Riley Mk. XX-Ford | DP | 262 | DNF | DNF |
| 2010 | (United States) Krohn Racing | (United States) Tracy Krohn (Sweden) Niclas Jönsson (Brazil) Ricardo Zonta | Proto-Auto Lola B08/70-Ford | DP | 735 | 4th | 4th |
| 2011 | (United States) Starworks Motorsport | (Canada) Mike Forest (United Kingdom) Ryan Dalziel (United States) Jim Lowe (Czech Republic) Tomáš Enge | Riley Mk. XX-Ford | DP | 552 | DNF | DNF |
| 2012 | (United States) Krohn Racing | (United States) Tracy Krohn (Sweden) Niclas Jönsson (Brazil) Ricardo Zonta | Proto-Auto Lola B08/70-Ford | DP | 713 | 19th | 11th |
| 2013 | (United States) Doran Racing | (United States) Jon Bennett (United States) Jim Lowe (Canada) Paul Tracy | Dallara (Riley) Mk. XX-Ford | DP | 286 | DNF | DNF |
| 2014 | (United States) CORE Autosport | (United States) Jon Bennett (United States) James Gue (Canada) Mark Wilkins | Oreca FLM09-Chevrolet | PC | 678 | 9th | **1st** |
| 2015 | (United States) CORE Autosport | (United States) Jon Bennett (United States) James Gue (Canada) Mark Wilkins | Oreca FLM09-Chevrolet | PC | 704 | 10th | **2nd** |
| 2016 | (United States) CORE Autosport | (United States) Jon Bennett (United Kingdom) Martin Plowman (Canada) Mark Wilkins | Oreca FLM09-Chevrolet | PC | 160 | DNF | DNF |
| 2017 | (United States) CORE Autosport | (United States) Jon Bennett (United States) Patrick Long (Sweden) Niclas Jönsson | Porsche 911 GT3 R | GTD | 340 | DNF | DNF |
| 2018 | (United States) CORE Autosport | (United States) Jon Bennett (France) Romain Dumas (France) Loïc Duval | Oreca 07-Gibson | P | 808 | **3rd** | **3rd** |
| 2019 | (United States) CORE Autosport | (United States) Jon Bennett (France) Romain Dumas (France) Loïc Duval | Nissan DPi | DPi | 589 | 4th | 4th |
| 2020 | (United States) DragonSpeed USA | (United Kingdom) Ben Hanley (Sweden) Henrik Hedman (United Kingdom) Harrison Newey | Oreca 07-Gibson | LMP2 | 811 | 9th | **1st** |
| 2021 | (United States) CORE Autosport | (United States) Jon Bennett (United States) George Kurtz (United States) Matt McMurry | Ligier JS P320 | LMP3 | 737 | 31st | 5th |
| 2022 | (United States) CORE Autosport | (United States) Jon Bennett (United States) George Kurtz (Sweden) Niclas Jönsson | Ligier JS P320 | LMP3 | 721 | 16th | **3rd** |
| 2023 | (United States) Meyer Shank Racing w/ Curb-Agajanian | (United Kingdom) Tom Blomqvist (Brazil) Hélio Castroneves (France) Simon Pagenaud | Acura ARX-06 | GTP | 783 | **1st** | **1st** |
| 2024 | (United States) CrowdStrike Racing by APR | (Denmark) Malthe Jakobsen (United States) George Kurtz (United Kingdom) Toby Sowery | Oreca 07-Gibson | LMP2 | 767 | 10th | **2nd** |

=== NASCAR ===
(key) (Bold – Pole position awarded by qualifying time. Italics – Pole position earned by points standings or practice time. * – Most laps led.)

==== Nationwide Series ====
NASCAR Nationwide Series results
| Year | Team | No. | Make | 1 | 2 | 3 | 4 | 5 | 6 | 7 | 8 | 9 | 10 | 11 | 12 | 13 | 14 | 15 | 16 | 17 | 18 | 19 | 20 | 21 | 22 | 23 | 24 | 25 | 26 | 27 | 28 | 29 | 30 | 31 | 32 | 33 | 34 | 35 | NNSC | Pts | Ref |
|---|---|---|---|---|---|---|---|---|---|---|---|---|---|---|---|---|---|---|---|---|---|---|---|---|---|---|---|---|---|---|---|---|---|---|---|---|---|---|---|---|---|
| 2007 | Roush Fenway Racing | 16 | Ford | DAY | CAL | MXC | LVS | ATL | BRI | NSH | TEX | PHO | TAL | RCH | DAR | CLT | DOV | NSH | KEN | MLW | NHA | DAY | CHI | GTY | IRP | CGV | GLN | MCH | BRI | CAL | RCH | DOV | KAN | CLT | MEM; 30 | TEX | PHO | HOM | 137th | 73 | |
| 2008 | Roush Fenway Racing | 16 | Ford | DAY | CAL | LVS | ATL | BRI | NSH; 15 | TEX | PHO | **MXC**; 33 | TAL | RCH | DAR | CLT | DOV | NSH | KEN | MLW; 21 | NHA | DAY; 35 | CHI | GTY | **IRP**; 2 | CGV | GLN | MCH | BRI | CAL | RCH | DOV | KAN | CLT | MEM | TEX | PHO | HOM | 63rd | 515 | |
| 2009 | Roush Fenway Racing | 60 | Ford | DAY | CAL | LVS | BRI | TEX | NSH | PHO | TAL | RCH | DAR | CLT | DOV | NSH | KEN | MLW; QL^{†} | NHA | DAY | CHI | GTY | IRP; QL^{†} | IOW | GLN | MCH | BRI | CGV | ATL | RCH | DOV | KAN | CAL | CLT | MEM | TEX | PHO | HOM | N/A | - | |
| 2010 | Roush Fenway Racing | 16 | Ford | DAY; 34 | CAL; 18 | LVS; 28 | BRI; 37 | NSH; 30 | PHO; 34 | TEX; 13 | TAL; 32 | RCH | DAR | DOV; 10 | CLT | NSH | KEN; 10 | ROA; 11 | NHA; 12 | DAY | CHI; 17 | GTY; 7 | IRP; 12 | IOW; 23 | GLN; 26 | MCH; 9 | BRI | CGV; 22 | ATL | RCH | DOV | KAN; 23 | CAL; 13 | CLT; 19 | | TEX | PHO; 7 | HOM; 29 | 23rd | 2374 | |
| 2010 | Roush Fenway Racing | 98 | Ford | | | | | | | | | | | | | | | | | | | | | | | | | | | | | | | | GTY; QL^{‡} | | | | 23rd | 2374 | |
^{†} - Qualified for Carl Edwards· ^{‡} - Qualified for Paul Menard

==== Craftsman Truck Series ====
NASCAR Craftsman Truck Series results
| Year | Team | No. | Make | 1 | 2 | 3 | 4 | 5 | 6 | 7 | 8 | 9 | 10 | 11 | 12 | 13 | 14 | 15 | 16 | 17 | 18 | 19 | 20 | 21 | 22 | 23 | 24 | 25 | NCTC | Pts | Ref |
|---|---|---|---|---|---|---|---|---|---|---|---|---|---|---|---|---|---|---|---|---|---|---|---|---|---|---|---|---|---|---|---|
| 2007 | Roush Fenway Racing | 50 | Ford | DAY | CAL | ATL | MAR | KAN | CLT | MFD | DOV | TEX | MCH | MLW | MEM | KEN | IRP | NSH | BRI | GTW | NHA | LVS | TAL | MAR; 34 | ATL | TEX | PHO | HOM | 109th | 61 | |
| 2008 | Roush Fenway Racing | 6 | Ford | DAY; 31 | CAL; 9 | ATL; 28 | MAR; 14 | KAN; 3 | CLT; 15 | MFD; 16 | DOV; 8 | TEX; 22 | MCH; 6 | MLW; 31 | MEM; 29 | KEN; 16 | IRP; 15 | NSH; 6 | BRI; 32 | GTW; 9 | NHA; 28 | LVS; 12 | TAL; 4 | MAR; 25 | ATL; 20 | TEX; 5 | PHO; 28 | HOM; 14 | 13th | 2856 | |
| 2009 | Roush Fenway Racing | 6 | Ford | **DAY**; 9 | CAL; 20 | ATL; 26 | MAR; 35 | KAN; 6 | CLT; 26 | DOV; 22 | TEX; 3 | MCH; 1 | MLW; 8 | MEM; 9 | KEN; 20 | **IRP**; 5 | NSH; 3 | BRI; 12 | CHI; 3 | IOW; 3 | **GTW**; 19 | NHA; 9 | LVS; 17 | MAR; 3 | TAL; 12 | TEX; 5 | PHO; 28 | **HOM**; 3 | 5th | 3338 | |
| 2011 | Billy Ballew Motorsports | 51 | Ford | DAY | PHO | DAR | MAR | NSH | DOV | CLT | KAN | TEX | KEN | IOW | NSH | IRP | POC | MCH; 9 | BRI | ATL; 19 | CHI | NHA | KEN | LVS | TAL | MAR | TEX | HOM | 50th | 60 | |
| 2026 | Kaulig Racing | 25 | Ram | DAY | ATL | STP; 9 | DAR | CAR | BRI | TEX | GLN | DOV | CLT | NSS | MCH | COR | LRP; 10 | NWS | IRP | RCH | NHA; 24 | BRI | KAN | CLT | PHO | TAL | MAR | HOM | 41st | 68 | |

=== ARCA Menards Series ===
(key) (Bold – Pole position awarded by qualifying time. Italics – Pole position earned by points standings or practice time. * – Most laps led.)

ARCA Menards Series results
| Year | Team | No. | Make | 1 | 2 | 3 | 4 | 5 | 6 | 7 | 8 | 9 | 10 | 11 | 12 | 13 | 14 | 15 | 16 | 17 | 18 | 19 | 20 | 21 | 22 | 23 | AMSC | Pts | Ref |
|---|---|---|---|---|---|---|---|---|---|---|---|---|---|---|---|---|---|---|---|---|---|---|---|---|---|---|---|---|---|
| 2007 | Roush Fenway Racing | 99 | Ford | DAY | USA | NSH | SLM | KAN | WIN | KEN | TOL | IOW | POC | MCH | BLN | KEN | POC | NSH | ISF | MIL | GTW; 9 | DSF | CHI; 3 | SLM | TAL; 9 | TOL | 51st | 595 | |
| 2008 | Roush Fenway Racing | 99 | Ford | DAY | SLM | IOW | KAN | CAR | KEN | TOL | POC | MCH | CAY | KEN | BLN | POC | NSH | ISF | DSF | CHI | SLM | NJM; RL^{†} | TAL | TOL | | | N/A | - | |
| 2020 | GMS Racing | 21 | Chevy | DAY | PHO | TAL | POC | IRP | KEN | IOW | KAN | TOL | TOL | MCH | DAY; RL^{‡} | GTW | DSF | BRI | MEM | SLM | KAN | MAD | ISF | | | | N/A | - | |
^{†} – Relieved Ricky Stenhouse Jr. during race · ^{‡} – Relieved Sam Mayer during race

=== American Le Mans Series results ===
(key) (Races in bold indicate pole position; results in italics indicate fastest lap)

| Year | Team | Class | Make | Engine | 1 | 2 | 3 | 4 | 5 | 6 | 7 | 8 | 9 | 10 | 11 | 12 | Pos. | Points | Ref |
|---|---|---|---|---|---|---|---|---|---|---|---|---|---|---|---|---|---|---|---|
| 2007 | Risi Competizione | GT2 | Ferrari F430GT | Ferrari 4.0L V8 | SEB; 9 | STP | LNB | TEX | UTA | LIM | MID | AME | MOS | DET | PET | MON | 42nd | 8 | |
| 2011 | Robertson Racing | GT | Ford GT-R Mk. VII | Élan 5.0 L V8 | SEB; 12† | LBH | LRP | MOS | MDO | ELK | BAL | LAG | PET | | | | 25th | 11 | |
| 2012 | CORE Autosport | PC | Oreca FLM09 | Chevrolet LS3 6.2 L V8 | SEB; 3 | LBH; 3 | LAG; 1 | LRP; 1 | MOS; 2 | MDO; 6 | ELK; 2 | BAL; Ret | VIR; 1 | PET; 3 | | | 2nd | 150 | |
| 2013 | CORE Autosport | PC | Oreca FLM09 | Chevrolet LS3 6.2 L V8 | SEB; 5 | LBH; 1 | LAG; 2 | LRP; 2 | MOS; 1 | ELK; 4 | BAL; 2 | | | | | | 5th | 112 | |
| 2013 | CORE Autosport | GT | Porsche 911 GT3-RSR | Porsche 4.0 L Flat-6 | | | | | | | | COA; Ret | VIR; 2 | PET; 8 | | | 20th | 23 | |

^{†} Did not finish the race but was classified as his car completed more than 70% of the overall winner's race distance.

=== 24 Hours of Le Mans results ===
| Year | Team | Co-Drivers | Car | Class | Laps | Pos. | Class Pos. |
|---|---|---|---|---|---|---|---|
| 2007 | (United States) Risi Competizione (United States) Krohn Racing | (United States) Tracy Krohn (Sweden) Niclas Jönsson | Ferrari F430 GT2 | GT2 | 314 | 19th | **2nd** |
| 2023 | (Portugal) Algarve Pro Racing | (Australia) James Allen (United States) George Kurtz | Oreca 07-Gibson | LMP2 | 322 | 20th | 10th |
| 2023 | (Portugal) Algarve Pro Racing | (Australia) James Allen (United States) George Kurtz | Oreca 07-Gibson | LMP2 Pro-Am | 322 | 20th | **1st** |
| 2024 | (Portugal) CrowdStrike Racing by APR | (Netherlands) Nicky Catsburg (United States) George Kurtz | Oreca 07-Gibson | LMP2 | 149 | DNF | DNF |
| 2024 | (Portugal) CrowdStrike Racing by APR | (Netherlands) Nicky Catsburg (United States) George Kurtz | Oreca 07-Gibson | LMP2 Pro-Am | 149 | DNF | DNF |
| 2025 | (United Kingdom) Nielsen Racing | (Turkey) Cem Bölükbaşı (United States) Naveen Rao | Oreca 07-Gibson | LMP2 | 170 | DNF | DNF |
| 2025 | (United Kingdom) Nielsen Racing | (Turkey) Cem Bölükbaşı (United States) Naveen Rao | Oreca 07-Gibson | LMP2 Pro-Am | 170 | DNF | DNF |

=== WeatherTech SportsCar Championship results ===
(key)(Races in bold indicate pole position. Races in italics indicate fastest race lap in class. Results are overall/class)

| Year | Team | Class | Make | Engine | 1 | 2 | 3 | 4 | 5 | 6 | 7 | 8 | 9 | 10 | 11 | 12 | Rank | Points | Ref |
|---|---|---|---|---|---|---|---|---|---|---|---|---|---|---|---|---|---|---|---|
| 2014 | CORE Autosport | PC | Oreca FLM09 | Chevrolet LS3 6.2 L V8 | **DAY**; 1 | SEB; 1 | LGA; 7 | KAN; 1 | **WGL**; 1 | **IMS**; 3 | ELK; 8 | VIR; 3 | AUS; 2 | ATL; 2 | | | **1st** | **321** | |
| 2015 | CORE Autosport | PC | Oreca FLM09 | Chevrolet LS3 6.2 L V8 | DAY; 2 | SEB; 2 | LGA; 2 | BEL; 4 | WGL; 4 | MOS; 1 | LIM; 4 | ELK; 3 | AUS; 1 | ATL; 4 | | | **1st** | **318** | |
| 2016 | CORE Autosport | PC | Oreca FLM09 | Chevrolet LS3 6.2 L V8 | DAY; 8 | **SEB**; 1 | LBH; 7 | LGA; 3 | BEL; 2 | WGL; 6 | **MOS**; 1 | **LIM**; 8 | ELK; 2 | AUS | ATL | | 7th | 245 | |
| 2017 | CORE Autosport | GTD | Porsche 911 GT3 R | Porsche 4.0 L Flat-6 | DAY; 22 | SEB; 16 | LBH; 14 | AUS; 14 | BEL; 8 | WGL; 13 | MOS; 14 | LIM; 17 | ELK; 7 | VIR; 8 | LGA; 4 | PET; 5 | 18th | 231 | |
| 2018 | CORE Autosport | P | Oreca 07 | Gibson GK428 4.2 L V8 | DAY; 3 | SEB; 4 | LBH; 10 | MOH; 13 | BEL; 12 | WGL; 2 | **MOS**; 1 | ELK; 1 | LGA; 2 | ATL; 7 | | | 2nd | 274 | |
| 2019 | CORE Autosport | DPi | Nissan Onroak DPi | Nissan VR38DETT 3.8 L Turbo V6 | DAY; 4 | SEB; 5 | LBH; 11 | MOH; 11 | BEL; 7 | WGL; 11 | **MOS**; 7 | ELK; 10 | LGA; 7 | ATL; 8 | | | 10th | 230 | |
| 2020 | DragonSpeed USA | LMP2 | Oreca 07 | Gibson GK428 4.2 L V8 | DAY; 1 | SEB | ELK | | | | | | | | | | 8th | 64 | |
| 2020 | Era Motorsport | LMP2 | Oreca 07 | Gibson GK428 4.2 L V8 | | | | ATL; 2 | | | | | | | | | 8th | 64 | |
| 2020 | Performance Tech Motorsports | LMP2 | Oreca 07 | Gibson GK428 4.2 L V8 | | | | | ATL; 2 | LGA | SEB | | | | | | 8th | 64 | |
| 2021 | CORE Autosport | LMP3 | Ligier JS P320 | Nissan VK56DE 5.6L V8 | DAY; 5 | SEB; 1 | MOH; 4 | | WGL; 2 | WGL; 3 | | ELK; 1 | | | | ATL; 7 | 2nd | 1990 | |
| 2021 | Scuderia Corsa | GTD | Ferrari 488 GT3 Evo 2020 | Ferrari F154CB 3.9 L Turbo V8 | | | | DET | | | LIM | | LGA | LBH; 10 | VIR | | 60th | 224 | |
| 2022 | CORE Autosport | LMP3 | Ligier JS P320 | Nissan VK56DE 5.6 L V8 | DAY; 3 | SEB; 5 | MDO; 1 | WGL; 2 | MOS; 1 | ELK; 3 | PET; 5 | | | | | | 1st | 2002 | |
| 2023 | Meyer Shank Racing with Curb-Agajanian | GTP | Acura ARX-06 | Acura AR24e 2.4 L Turbo V6 | DAY; 1 | SEB; 6 | LBH; 6 | MON; 6 | WGL; 3 | **MOS**; **1** | ELK; 2 | IMS; 6 | PET; 1 | | | | 3rd | 2711 | |
| 2024 | CrowdStrike Racing by APR | LMP2 | Oreca 07 | Gibson GK428 4.2 L V8 | DAY; 2 | SEB; 9 | WGL; 13 | MOS; 7 | ELK | IMS | ATL | | | | | | 24th | 1065 | |
| 2025 | Acura Meyer Shank Racing w/Curb-Agajanian | GTP | Acura ARX-06 | Acura AR24e 2.4 L Turbo V6 | DAY; 2 | SEB; 10 | LBH; 9 | LGA; 11 | DET; 6 | WGL; 1 | ELK; 7 | IMS; 3 | **PET**; 5 | | | | 7th | 2602 | |
| 2026 | Acura Meyer Shank Racing w/Curb-Agajanian | GTP | Acura ARX-06 | Acura AR24e 2.4 L Turbo V6 | DAY; 9 | SEB; 4 | LBH; 7 | LGA; 4 | DET; 7 | WGL; 10 | ELK; 9 | IMS; 5 | PET; 6 | | | | 10th | 2465 | |

=== Complete Global Rallycross Championship results ===
(key)

==== GRC Lites ====
| Year | Entrant | Car | 1 | 2 | 3 | 4 | 5 | 6 | 7 | 8 | 9 | 10 | 11 | 12 | GRC | Points |
|---|---|---|---|---|---|---|---|---|---|---|---|---|---|---|---|---|
| 2016 | CORE Autosport | Lites Ford Fiesta | PHO1 | PHO2 | DAL | DAY1; 3 | DAY2; 10 | MCAS1 | MCAS2; C | DC; 12 | AC; 3 | SEA | LA1; DSQ | LA2; 3 | 10th | 154 |
| 2017 | CORE Autosport | Lites Ford Fiesta | MEM; 4 | LOU; 4 | THO1; 4 | THO2; 2 | OTT1; 2 | OTT2; 8 | INDY | AC1; DNS | AC2; 4 | SEA1 | SEA2 | LA | 8th | 405 |

=== American open-wheel racing results ===
==== IndyCar Series ====
(key) (Races in bold indicate pole position; races in italics indicate fastest lap)

| Year | Team | No. | Chassis | Engine | 1 | 2 | 3 | 4 | 5 | 6 | 7 | 8 | 9 | 10 | 11 | 12 | 13 | 14 | 15 | 16 | 17 | 18 | Rank | Points | Ref |
|---|---|---|---|---|---|---|---|---|---|---|---|---|---|---|---|---|---|---|---|---|---|---|---|---|---|
| 2024 | Dale Coyne Racing with Rick Ware Racing | 51 | Dallara DW12 | Honda | STP; 20 | THE; DNQ | LBH | ALA | IMS | INDY | DET | ROA | LAG | MDO | IOW | IOW | TOR | GTW | POR | MIL | MIL | NSH | 40th | 10 | |
