= List of IMSA SportsCar Championship champions =

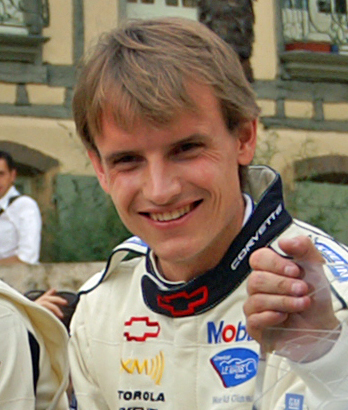
Antonio García has won more IMSA SportsCar Championship Drivers' Championships than any other driver with four.

The IMSA SportsCar Championship, currently known as the IMSA WeatherTech SportsCar Championship under sponsorship, is a sports car racing series based in the United States and Canada and organized by the International Motor Sports Association (IMSA). It is a result of a merger between two existing North American sports car racing series, the American Le Mans Series and Rolex Sports Car Series. At its inception, the name was United SportsCar Championship, which subsequently changed to IMSA SportsCar Championship in 2016. IMSA awards championships and trophies to the most successful drivers and teams in each of the series' categories over the course of a season. Since 2021, points are awarded for individual race results as well as qualifying, with the highest tally of points winning the respective championship or trophy. Other unique championships include the Michelin Endurance Cup, WeatherTech Sprint Cup, Jim Trueman Award, Bob Akin Award, and the VP Fuels Front Runner Award. The Drivers', Teams', and Manufacturers' Championships have awarded since the series began in 2014, while the Tire Manufacturers' Championships was discontinued after the 2015 season. At the conclusion of the season, three champions receive an automatic invitation to the 24 Hours of Le Mans. The champions are not formally crowned until the IMSA awards ceremony after the season's final race.

There were four classes when the series was founded in 2014: Prototype (P), Prototype Challenge (PC), Grand Touring Le Mans (GTLM), and Grand Touring Daytona (GTD). In 2017, the PC class was discontinued when the season ended. The Prototype category was replaced by the Daytona Prototype International (DPi) and Le Mans Prototype 2 (LMP2) classes in 2019. In 2021, the Le Mans Prototype 3 (LMP3) category was introduced. The following year, Grand Touring Daytona Pro (GTD Pro) replaced the GTLM class. GTP replaced DPi as IMSA's top class and the LMP3 category was discontinued following the 2023 season.

As of the 2024 season, 53 drivers and 20 teams have won an IMSA title. Dane Cameron and Antonio García are the most successful IMSA drivers with four championships and Action Express Racing, PR1/Mathiasen Motorsports, and Corvette Racing are the series' most successful team with five titles. There have been 28 drivers and 10 teams who have won a title in the Prototype classes. Jon Bennett, Colin Braun, Dane Cameron, and Felipe Nasr have earned the most Prototype drivers' titles with three each and Action Express Racing, and PR1/Mathiasen Motorsports have achieved the most Prototype teams' championships with four. Of the 28 drivers and 12 teams to have achieved a GT championship, García's four championship wins are the most in the GT classes and Corvette Racing have claimed all five of their teams' titles in the GT categories.

== Key ==
Tyre manufacturers
Key
Symbol	Tyre manufacturer
C	Continental
M	Michelin
F	Falken Tire

== Drivers' Championships ==
=== GTP ===
Winners of the GTP Drivers' Championship
Season	Drivers	Team	Manufacturer	Tyre	Poles	Wins	Podiums	Points	Clinched	Margin	Ref
2023	Pipo Derani (BRA)	Whelen Cadillac Racing (USA)	Cadillac (USA)	M	2	1	3	2733	Race 11 of 11	21	
2023	Alexander Sims (GBR)	Whelen Cadillac Racing (USA)	Cadillac (USA)	M	2	1	3	2733	Race 11 of 11	21	
2024	Dane Cameron (USA)	Porsche Penske Motorsport (GER)	Porsche (DEU)	M	0	2	7	2982	Race 11 of 11	113	
2024	Felipe Nasr (BRA)	Porsche Penske Motorsport (GER)	Porsche (DEU)	M	0	2	7	2982	Race 11 of 11	113	
2025	Matt Campbell (AUS)	Porsche Penske Motorsport (GER)	Porsche (DEU)	M	0	1	6	2907	Race 11 of 11	187	
2025	Mathieu Jaminet (FRA)	Porsche Penske Motorsport (GER)	Porsche (DEU)	M	0	1	6	2907	Race 11 of 11	187	
2026	Jack Aitken (GBR)	Cadillac Whelen (USA)	Cadillac (USA)	M	3	2*	7*	3020	Race 11 of 11	161	

=== LMP2 ===
Winners of the LMP2 Drivers' Championship
Season	Drivers	Team	Tyre	Poles	Wins	Podiums	Points	Clinched	Margin	Ref
2019	Matt McMurry (USA)	PR1/Mathiasen Motorsports (USA)	M	3	6	7	270	Race 12 of 12	13	
2020	Patrick Kelly (USA)	PR1/Mathiasen Motorsports (USA)	M	6	4	4	196	Race 10 of 11	35	
2021	Mikkel Jensen (DNK)	PR1/Mathiasen Motorsports (USA)	M	5	3	6	2162	Race 12 of 12	136	
2021	Ben Keating (USA)	PR1/Mathiasen Motorsports (USA)	M	5	3	6	2162	Race 12 of 12	136	
2022	John Farano (CAN)	Tower Motorsport (USA)	M	0	2	5	2018	Race 12 of 12	126	
2023	Paul-Loup Chatin (FRA)	PR1/Mathiasen Motorsports (USA)	M	4	1	4	1995	Race 11 of 11	37	
2023	Ben Keating (USA)	PR1/Mathiasen Motorsports (USA)	M	4	1	4	1995	Race 11 of 11	37	
2024	Nick Boulle (USA)	Inter Europol by PR1/Mathiasen Motorsports (POL)	M	1	1	3	2227	Race 11 of 11	61	
2024	Tom Dillmann (FRA)	Inter Europol by PR1/Mathiasen Motorsports (POL)	M	1	1	3	2227	Race 11 of 11	61	
2025	Dane Cameron (USA)	AO Racing (USA)	M	2	2	3	2254	Race 11 of 11	100	
2025	P.J. Hyett (USA)	AO Racing (USA)	M	2	2	3	2254	Race 11 of 11	100	
2026	George Kurtz (USA)	CrowdStrike Racing by APR (USA)	M	0	2	5	2322	Race 11 of 11	20	
2026	Alex Quinn (GBR)	CrowdStrike Racing by APR (USA)	M	0	2	5	2322	Race 11 of 11	20	

=== GTD Pro ===
Winners of the GTD Pro Drivers' Championship
Season	Drivers	Team	Manufacturer	Tyre	Poles	Wins	Podiums	Points	Clinched	Margin	Ref
2022	Matt Campbell (AUS)	Pfaff Motorsports (CAN)	Porsche (DEU)	M	3	5	8	3497	Race 12 of 12	220	
2022	Mathieu Jaminet (FRA)	Pfaff Motorsports (CAN)	Porsche (DEU)	M	3	5	8	3497	Race 12 of 12	220	
2023	Ben Barnicoat (GBR)	Vasser Sullivan Racing (USA)	Lexus (JPN)	M	4	2	9	3760	Race 11 of 11	112	
2023	Jack Hawksworth (GBR)	Vasser Sullivan Racing (USA)	Lexus (JPN)	M	4	2	9	3760	Race 11 of 11	112	
2024	Laurin Heinrich (GER)	AO Racing (USA)	Porsche (DEU)	M	2	3	5	3122	Race 11 of 11	4	
2025	Antonio García (ESP)	Corvette Racing by Pratt Miller Motorsports (USA)	Chevrolet (USA)	M	0	1	6	3265	Race 11 of 11	73	
2025	Alexander Sims (GBR)	Corvette Racing by Pratt Miller Motorsports (USA)	Chevrolet (USA)	M	0	1	6	3265	Race 11 of 11	73	
2026	Connor De Phillippi (USA)	Paul Miller Racing (USA)	BMW (DEU)	M	2	1	4	3012	Race 11 of 11	33	
2026	Neil Verhagen (USA)	Paul Miller Racing (USA)	BMW (DEU)	M	2	1	4	3012	Race 11 of 11	33	

=== GTD ===
Winners of the GTD Drivers' Championship
Season	Drivers	Team	Manufacturer	Tyre	Poles	Wins	Podiums	Points	Clinched	Margin	Ref
2014	Dane Cameron (USA)	Turner Motorsport (USA)	BMW (DEU)	C	2	4	6	304	Round 13 of 13	9	
2015	Townsend Bell (USA)	Scuderia Corsa (USA)	Ferrari (ITA)	C	0	1	2	281	Race 12 of 12	2	
2015	Bill Sweedler (USA)	Scuderia Corsa (USA)	Ferrari (ITA)	C	0	1	2	281	Race 12 of 12	2	
2016	Alessandro Balzan (ITA)	Scuderia Corsa (USA)	Ferrari (ITA)	C	0	2	7	332	Race 12 of 12	29	
2016	Christina Nielsen (DNK)	Scuderia Corsa (USA)	Ferrari (ITA)	C	0	2	7	332	Race 12 of 12	29	
2017	Alessandro Balzan (ITA)	Scuderia Corsa (USA)	Ferrari (ITA)	C	0	1	7	340	Race 12 of 12	20	
2017	Christina Nielsen (DNK)	Scuderia Corsa (USA)	Ferrari (ITA)	C	0	1	7	340	Race 12 of 12	20	
2018	Bryan Sellers (USA)	Paul Miller Racing (USA)	Lamborghini (ITA)	C	1	2	8	333	Race 12 of 12	4	
2018	Madison Snow (USA)	Paul Miller Racing (USA)	Lamborghini (ITA)	C	1	2	8	333	Race 12 of 12	4	
2019	Mario Farnbacher (DEU)	Meyer Shank Racing with Curb-Agajanian (USA)	Acura (JPN)	M	2	1	5	283	Race 12 of 12	19	
2019	Trent Hindman (USA)	Meyer Shank Racing with Curb-Agajanian (USA)	Acura (JPN)	M	2	1	5	283	Race 12 of 12	19	
2020	Mario Farnbacher (DEU)	Meyer Shank Racing with Curb-Agajanian (USA)	Acura (JPN)	M	2	2	6	288	Race 11 of 11	4	
2020	Matt McMurry (USA)	Meyer Shank Racing with Curb-Agajanian (USA)	Acura (JPN)	M	2	2	6	288	Race 11 of 11	4	
2021	Zacharie Robichon (CAN)	Pfaff Motorsports (CAN)	Porsche (DEU)	M	0	4	6	3284	Race 12 of 12	121	
2021	Laurens Vanthoor (BEL)	Pfaff Motorsports (CAN)	Porsche (DEU)	M	0	4	6	3284	Race 12 of 12	121	
2022	Roman De Angelis (CAN)	Heart of Racing Team (USA)	Aston Martin (GBR)	M	0	2	5	2898	Race 12 of 12	23	
2023	Bryan Sellers (USA)	Paul Miller Racing (USA)	BMW (DEU)	M	3	5	7	3482	Race 10 of 11	261	
2023	Madison Snow (USA)	Paul Miller Racing (USA)	BMW (DEU)	M	3	5	7	3482	Race 10 of 11	261	
2024	Philip Ellis (SUI)	Winward Racing (USA)	Mercedes-AMG (DEU)	M	0	4	6	3266	Race 11 of 11	230	
2024	Russell Ward (USA)	Winward Racing (USA)	Mercedes-AMG (DEU)	M	0	4	6	3266	Race 11 of 11	230	
2025	Philip Ellis (SUI)	Winward Racing (USA)	Mercedes-AMG (DEU)	M	1	3	4	3103	Race 11 of 11	195	
2025	Russell Ward (USA)	Winward Racing (USA)	Mercedes-AMG (DEU)	M	1	3	4	3103	Race 11 of 11	195	
2026	Philip Ellis (SUI)	Winward Racing (USA)	Mercedes-AMG (DEU)	M	1	5	6	3078	Race 11 of 11	235	
2026	Russell Ward (USA)	Winward Racing (USA)	Mercedes-AMG (DEU)	M	1	5	6	3078	Race 11 of 11	235	

=== Prototype ===
Winners of the Prototype Drivers' Championship
Season	Drivers	Team	Manufacturer	Tyre	Poles	Wins	Podiums	Points	Clinched	Margin	Ref(s)
2014	João Barbosa (POR)	Action Express Racing (USA)	Chevrolet (USA)	C	0	3	8	349	Race 13 of 13	19	
2014	Christian Fittipaldi (BRA)	Action Express Racing (USA)	Chevrolet (USA)	C	0	3	8	349	Race 13 of 13	19	
2015	João Barbosa (POR)	Action Express Racing (USA)	Chevrolet (USA)	C	2	2	6	309	Race 12 of 12	3	
2015	Christian Fittipaldi (BRA)	Action Express Racing (USA)	Chevrolet (USA)	C	2	2	6	309	Race 12 of 12	3	
2016	Dane Cameron (USA)	Action Express Racing (USA)	Chevrolet (USA)	C	0	2	7	314	Race 12 of 12	3	
2016	Eric Curran (USA)	Action Express Racing (USA)	Chevrolet (USA)	C	0	2	7	314	Race 12 of 12	3	
2017	Jordan Taylor (USA)	Wayne Taylor Racing (USA)	Cadillac (USA)	C	5	5	7	310	Race 12 of 12	19	
2017	Ricky Taylor (USA)	Wayne Taylor Racing (USA)	Cadillac (USA)	C	5	5	7	310	Race 12 of 12	19	
2018	Eric Curran (USA)	Action Express Racing (USA)	Cadillac (USA)	C	0	1	5	277	Race 12 of 12	3	
2018	Felipe Nasr (BRA)	Action Express Racing (USA)	Cadillac (USA)	C	0	1	5	277	Race 12 of 12	3	

=== DPi ===
Winners of the DPi Drivers' Championship
Season	Drivers	Team	Manufacturer	Tyre	Poles	Wins	Podiums	Points	Clinched	Margin	Ref
2019	Dane Cameron (USA)	Acura Team Penske (USA)	Acura (JPN)	M	3	3	7	302	Race 12 of 12	5	
2019	Juan Pablo Montoya (COL)	Acura Team Penske (USA)	Acura (JPN)	M	3	3	7	302	Race 12 of 12	5	
2020	Hélio Castroneves (BRA)	Acura Team Penske (USA)	Acura (JPN)	M	4	4	5	265	Race 11 of 11	1	
2020	Ricky Taylor (USA)	Acura Team Penske (USA)	Acura (JPN)	M	4	4	5	265	Race 11 of 11	1	
2021	Felipe Nasr (BRA)	Whelen Engineering Racing (USA)	Cadillac (USA)	M	5	3	7	3407	Race 12 of 12	11	
2021	Pipo Derani (BRA)	Whelen Engineering Racing (USA)	Cadillac (USA)	M	5	3	7	3407	Race 12 of 12	11	
2022	Tom Blomqvist (GBR)	Meyer Shank Racing with Curb-Agajanian (USA)	Acura (JPN)	M	3	2	7	3432	Race 12 of 12	86	
2022	Oliver Jarvis (GBR)	Meyer Shank Racing with Curb-Agajanian (USA)	Acura (JPN)	M	3	2	7	3432	Race 12 of 12	86	

=== PC ===
Winners of the PC Drivers' Championship
Season	Drivers	Team	Tyre	Poles	Wins	Podiums	Points	Clinched	Margin	Ref
2014	Jon Bennett (USA)	CORE Autosport (USA)	C	3	4	8	321	Race 12 of 13	39	
2014	Colin Braun (USA)	CORE Autosport (USA)	C	3	4	8	321	Race 12 of 13	39	
2015	Jon Bennett (USA)	CORE Autosport (USA)	C	1	2	6	318	Race 12 of 12	5	
2015	Colin Braun (USA)	CORE Autosport (USA)	C	1	2	6	318	Race 12 of 12	5	
2016	Alex Popow (VEN)	Starworks Motorsport (USA)	C	1	4	8	355	Race 12 of 12	0	
2016	Renger van der Zande (NLD)	Starworks Motorsport (USA)	C	1	4	8	355	Race 12 of 12	0	
2017	James French (USA)	Performance Tech Motorsports (USA)	C	8	7	8	283	Race 9 of 12	39	
2017	Pato O'Ward (MEX)	Performance Tech Motorsports (USA)	C	8	7	8	283	Race 9 of 12	39	

=== LMP3 ===
Winners of the LMP3 Drivers' Championship
Season	Drivers	Team	Tyre	Poles	Wins	Podiums	Points	Clinched	Margin	Ref
2021	Gar Robinson (USA)	Riley Motorsports (USA)	M	1	5	7	2176	Race 12 of 12	186	
2022	Jon Bennett (USA)	CORE Autosport (USA)	M	0	2	5	2002	Race 12 of 12	54	
2022	Colin Braun (USA)	CORE Autosport (USA)	M	0	2	5	2002	Race 12 of 12	54	
2023	Gar Robinson (USA)	Riley Motorsports (USA)	M	2	4	6	2162	Race 11 of 11	217	

=== GTLM ===
Winners of the GTLM Drivers' Championship
Season	Drivers	Team	Manufacturer	Tyre	Poles	Wins	Podiums	Points	Clinched	Margin	Ref
2014	Kuno Wittmer (CAN)	SRT Motorsports (USA)	Dodge (USA)	M	1	2	7	331	Race 13 of 13	5	
2015	Patrick Pilet (FRA)	Porsche North America (USA)	Porsche (DEU)	M	1	4	6	315	Race 12 of 12	10	
2016	Oliver Gavin (GBR)	Corvette Racing (USA)	Chevrolet (USA)	M	0	4	7	345	Race 12 of 12	17	
2016	Tommy Milner (USA)	Corvette Racing (USA)	Chevrolet (USA)	M	0	4	7	345	Race 12 of 12	17	
2017	Antonio García (ESP)	Corvette Racing (USA)	Chevrolet (USA)	M	1	3	5	334	Race 12 of 12	27	
2017	Jan Magnussen (DNK)	Corvette Racing (USA)	Chevrolet (USA)	M	1	3	5	334	Race 12 of 12	27	
2018	Antonio García (ESP)	Corvette Racing (USA)	Chevrolet (USA)	M	2	0	8	322	Race 12 of 12	6	
2018	Jan Magnussen (DNK)	Corvette Racing (USA)	Chevrolet (USA)	M	2	0	8	322	Race 12 of 12	6	
2019	Earl Bamber (NZL)	Porsche GT Team (USA)	Porsche (DEU)	M	2	3	7	330	Race 12 of 12	13	
2019	Laurens Vanthoor (BEL)	Porsche GT Team (USA)	Porsche (DEU)	M	2	3	7	330	Race 12 of 12	13	
2020	Antonio García (ESP)	Corvette Racing (USA)	Chevrolet (USA)	M	6	5	8	351	Race 10 of 11	32	
2020	Jordan Taylor (USA)	Corvette Racing (USA)	Chevrolet (USA)	M	6	5	8	351	Race 10 of 11	32	
2021	Antonio García (ESP)	Corvette Racing (USA)	Chevrolet (USA)	M	7	4	9	3549	Race 12 of 12	101	
2021	Jordan Taylor (USA)	Corvette Racing (USA)	Chevrolet (USA)	M	7	4	9	3549	Race 12 of 12	101	

== Teams' Championships ==
=== GTP ===
Winners of the GTP Teams' Championship
Season	Team	Cars	Tyre	Poles	Wins	Podiums	Points	Clinched	Margin	Ref
2023	Whelen Cadillac Racing (USA)	Cadillac V-Series.R	M	2	1	3	2733	Race 11 of 11	21	
2024	Porsche Penske Motorsport (GER)	Porsche 963	M	0	2	7	2982	Race 11 of 11	113	
2025	Porsche Penske Motorsport (GER)	Porsche 963	M	0	1	6	2907	Race 11 of 11	187	
2026	Cadillac Whelen (USA)	Cadillac V-Series.R	M	3	2	7	3020	Race 11 of 11	297	

=== LMP2 ===
Winners of the LMP2 Teams' Championship
Season	Team	Cars	Tyre	Poles	Wins	Podiums	Points	Clinched	Margin	Ref
2019	PR1/Mathiasen Motorsports (USA)	Oreca 07	M	3	6	7	270	Race 12 of 12	13	
2020	PR1/Mathiasen Motorsports (USA)	Oreca 07	M	6	4	4	196	Race 10 of 11	35	
2021	PR1/Mathiasen Motorsports (USA)	Oreca 07	M	5	3	6	2162	Race 12 of 12	136	
2022	Tower Motorsport (USA)	Oreca 07	M	0	2	5	2018	Race 12 of 12	126	
2023	PR1/Mathiasen Motorsports (USA)	Oreca 07	M	4	1	44	1995	Race 11 of 11	37	
2024	Inter Europol by PR1/Mathiasen Motorsports (POL)	Oreca 07	M	1	1	3	2227	Race 11 of 11	61	
2025	AO Racing (USA)	Oreca 07	M	2	2	3	2254	Race 11 of 11	100	
2026	CrowdStrike Racing by APR (USA)	Oreca 07	M	0	2	5	2322	Race 11 of 11	20	

=== GTD Pro ===
Winners of the GTD Pro Teams' Championship
Season	Team	Cars	Tyre	Poles	Wins	Podiums	Points	Clinched	Margin	Ref
2022	Pfaff Motorsports (CAN)	Porsche 911 GT3 R	M	3	5	8	3497	Race 12 of 12	220	
2023	Vasser Sullivan Racing (USA)	Lexus RC F GT3	M	4	2	9	3760	Race 11 of 11	112	
2024	AO Racing (USA)	Porsche 911 GT3 R (992)	M	2	3	5	3122	Race 11 of 11	4	
2025	Corvette Racing by Pratt Miller Motorsports (USA)	Chevrolet Corvette Z06 GT3.R	M	2	1	4	3017	Race 11 of 11	38	
2026	Paul Miller Racing (USA)	BMW M4 GT3 Evo	M	0	1	6	3265	Race 11 of 11	73	

=== GTD ===
Winners of the GTD Teams' Championship
Season	Team	Cars	Tyre	Poles	Wins	Podiums	Points	Clinched	Margin	Ref
2014	Turner Motorsport (USA)	BMW Z4 GT3	C	2	4	6	304	Round 13 of 13	9	
2015	Scuderia Corsa (USA)	Ferrari 458 Italia GT3	C	0	1	2	281	Race 12 of 12	2	
2016	Scuderia Corsa (USA)	Ferrari 458 GT3	C	0	2	7	332	Race 12 of 12	29	
2016	Scuderia Corsa (USA)	Ferrari 488 GT3	C	0	2	7	332	Race 12 of 12	29	
2017	Scuderia Corsa (USA)	Ferrari 488 GT3	C	0	1	7	340	Race 12 of 12	20	
2018	Paul Miller Racing (USA)	Lamborghini Huracán GT3	C	1	2	8	333	Race 12 of 12	4	
2019	Meyer Shank Racing with Curb-Agajanian (USA)	Acura NSX GT3 Evo	M	2	1	5	283	Race 12 of 12	19	
2020	Meyer Shank Racing with Curb-Agajanian (USA)	Acura NSX GT3 Evo	M	2	2	6	288	Race 11 of 11	4	
2021	Pfaff Motorsports (CAN)	Porsche 911 GT3 R	M	0	4	6	3284	Race 12 of 12	121	
2022	Heart of Racing Team (USA)	Aston Martin Vantage GT3	M	0	2	5	2898	Race 12 of 12	23	
2023	Paul Miller Racing (USA)	BMW M4 GT3	M	3	5	7	3482	Race 10 of 11	261	
2024	Winward Racing (USA)	Mercedes-AMG GT3 Evo	M	0	4	6	3532	Race 11 of 11	230	
2025	Winward Racing (USA)	Mercedes-AMG GT3 Evo	M	1	3	4	3103	Race 11 of 11	205	
2026	Winward Racing (USA)	Mercedes-AMG GT3 Evo	M	1	5	6	3078	Race 11 of 11	235	

=== Prototype ===
Winners of the Prototype Teams' Championship
Season	Team	Cars	Tyre	Poles	Wins	Podiums	Points	Clinched	Margin	Ref
2014	Action Express Racing (USA)	Chevrolet Corvette DP	C	0	3	8	349	Race 13 of 13	19	
2015	Action Express Racing (USA)	Chevrolet Corvette DP	C	2	2	6	309	Race 12 of 12	3	
2016	Action Express Racing (USA)	Chevrolet Corvette DP	C	0	2	7	314	Race 12 of 12	3	
2017	Wayne Taylor Racing (USA)	Cadillac DPi-V.R	C	5	5	7	310	Race 12 of 12	19	
2018	Action Express Racing (USA)	Cadillac DPi-V.R	C	0	1	5	277	Race 12 of 12	3	

=== DPi ===
Winners of the DPi Teams' Championship
Season	Team	Cars	Tyre	Poles	Wins	Podiums	Points	Clinched	Margin	Ref
2019	Acura Team Penske (USA)	Acura ARX-05	M	3	3	7	302	Race 12 of 12	5	
2020	Acura Team Penske (USA)	Acura ARX-05	M	4	4	5	265	Race 11 of 11	1	
2021	Whelen Engineering Racing (USA)	Cadillac DPi-V.R	M	5	3	7	3407	Race 12 of 12	11	
2022	Meyer Shank Racing with Curb-Agajanian (USA)	Acura ARX-05	M	3	2	7	3432	Race 12 of 12	86	

=== PC ===
Winners of the PC Teams' Championship
Season	Team	Cars	Tyre	Poles	Wins	Podiums	Points	Clinched	Margin	Ref
2014	CORE Autosport (USA)	Oreca FLM09	C	3	4	8	321	Race 12 of 13	39	
2015	CORE Autosport (USA)	Oreca FLM09	C	1	2	6	318	Race 12 of 12	5	
2016	Starworks Motorsport (USA)	Oreca FLM09	C	1	4	8	355	Race 12 of 12	0	
2017	Performance Tech Motorsports (USA)	Oreca FLM09	C	8	7	8	283	Race 9 of 12	39	

=== LMP3 ===
Winners of the LMP3 Teams' Championship
Season	Team	Cars	Tyre	Poles	Wins	Podiums	Points	Clinched	Margin	Ref
2021	Riley Motorsports (USA)	Ligier JS P320	M	1	5	7	2176	Race 12 of 12	186	
2022	CORE Autosport (USA)	Ligier JS P320	M	0	2	5	2002	Race 12 of 12	54	
2023	Riley Motorsports (USA)	Ligier JS P320	M	2	4	6	2162	Race 11 of 11	217	

=== GTLM ===
Winners of the GTLM Teams' Championship
Season	Team	Cars	Tyre	Poles	Wins	Podiums	Points	Clinched	Margin	Ref
2014	SRT Motorsports (USA)	SRT Viper GTS-R	M	0	2	6	326	Race 13 of 13	9	
2015	Porsche North America (USA)	Porsche 911 RSR	M	1	4	6	315	Race 12 of 12	10	
2016	Corvette Racing (USA)	Chevrolet Corvette C7.R	M	0	4	7	345	Race 12 of 12	17	
2017	Corvette Racing (USA)	Chevrolet Corvette C7.R	M	1	3	5	334	Race 12 of 12	27	
2018	Corvette Racing (USA)	Chevrolet Corvette C7.R	M	2	0	8	332	Race 12 of 12	6	
2019	Porsche GT Team (USA)	Porsche 911 RSR	M	2	3	7	330	Race 12 of 12	13	
2020	Corvette Racing (USA)	Chevrolet Corvette C8.R	M	6	5	8	351	Race 10 of 11	32	
2021	Corvette Racing (USA)	Chevrolet Corvette C8.R	M	7	4	9	3549	Race 12 of 12	101	

== Manufacturers' Championships ==
=== GTP ===
Winners of the GTP Manufacturers' Championship
Season	Manufacturer	Cars	Tyre	Poles	Wins	Podiums	Points	Clinched	Margin	Ref(s)
2023	Cadillac (USA)	Cadillac V-Series.R	M	2	2	6	3096	Race 11 of 11	16	
2024	Porsche (DEU)	Porsche 963	M	1	4	13	3257	Race 11 of 11	91	
2025	Porsche (DEU)	Porsche 963	M	0	4	10	3134	Race 11 of 11	42	

=== GTD Pro ===
Winners of the GTD Pro Manufacturers' Championship
Season	Manufacturer	Cars	Tyre	Poles	Wins	Podiums	Points	Clinched	Margin	Ref(s)
2022	Porsche (DEU)	Porsche 911 GT3 R	M	3	5	9	3497	Race 12 of 12	190	
2023	Lexus (JPN)	Lexus RC F GT3	M	4	2	9	3770	Race 11 of 11	122	
2024	Porsche (DEU)	Porsche 911 GT3 R (992)	M	2	3	5	3215	Race 11 of 11	57	
2025	Chevrolet (USA)	Chevrolet Corvette Z06 GT3.R	M	0	1	9	3370	Race 11 of 11	45	

=== GTD ===
Winners of the GTD Manufacturers' Championship
Season	Manufacturer	Cars	Tyre	Poles	Wins	Podiums	Points	Clinched	Margin	Ref(s)
2014	Porsche (DEU)	Porsche 911 GT America	C	1	1	7	343	Round 13 of 13	3	
2015	Ferrari (ITA)	Ferrari 458 Italia GT3	C	0	1	2	307	Race 12 of 12	1	
2016	Audi (DEU)	Audi R8 LMS GT3	C	0	2	8	334	Race 12 of 12	6	
2017	Ferrari (ITA)	Ferrari 488 GT3	C	2	1	7	352	Race 12 of 12	4	
2018	Lamborghini (ITA)	Lamborghini Huracán GT3	M	1	3	9	340	Race 12 of 12	10	
2019	Lamborghini (ITA)	Lamborghini Huracán GT3 Evo	M	2	3	7	294	Race 12 of 12	2	
2020	Acura (JPN)	Acura NSX GT3 Evo	M	2	2	7	299	Race 11 of 11	8	
2021	Porsche (DEU)	Porsche 911 GT3 R	M	2	4	8	3425	Race 12 of 12	135	
2022	BMW (DEU)	BMW M4 GT3	M	4	3	9	3307	Race 12 of 12	72	
2023	BMW (DEU)	BMW M4 GT3	M	3	5	11	3888	Race 11 of 11	404	
2024	Mercedes-AMG (DEU)	Mercedes-AMG GT3 Evo	M	3	5	9	3532	Race 10 of 11	574	
2025	Mercedes-AMG (DEU)	Mercedes-AMG GT3 Evo	M	2	3	5	3363	Race 11 of 11	39	

=== Prototype ===
Winners of the Prototype Manufacturers' Championship
Season	Manufacturer	Cars	Tyre	Poles	Wins	Podiums	Points	Clinched	Margin	Ref(s)
2014	Chevrolet (USA)	Chevrolet Corvette DP	C	4	6	18	366	Round 13 of 13	17	
2015	Chevrolet (USA)	Chevrolet Corvette DP	C	6	8	21	344	Race 12 of 12	26	
2016	Chevrolet (USA)	Chevrolet Corvette DP	C	3	6	23	338	Race 12 of 12	14	
2017	Cadillac (USA)	Cadillac DPi-V.R	C	7	6	18	344	Race 12 of 12	24	
2018	Cadillac (USA)	Cadillac DPi-V.R	C	3	4	11	332	Race 12 of 12	16	

=== DPi ===
Winners of the DPi Manufacturers' Championship
Season	Manufacturer	Cars	Tyre	Poles	Wins	Podiums	Points	Clinched	Margin	Ref(s)
2019	Acura (JPN)	Acura ARX-05	M	3	3	10	329	Race 12 of 12	5	
2020	Acura (JPN)	Acura ARX-05	M	7	4	8	294	Race 11 of 11	3	
2021	Cadillac (USA)	Cadillac DPi-V.R	M	6	6	15	3666	Race 12 of 12	113	
2022	Acura (JPN)	Acura ARX-05	M	5	6	12	3718	Race 12 of 12	66	

=== GTLM ===
Winners of the GTLM Manufacturers' Championship
Season	Manufacturer	Cars	Tyre	Poles	Wins	Podiums	Points	Clinched	Margin	Ref(s)
2014	Porsche (DEU)	Porsche 911 RSR	M/F	2	3	7	343	Round 13 of 13	3	
2015	Porsche (DEU)	Porsche 911 RSR	M/F	5	5	10	325	Race 12 of 12	6	
2016	Chevrolet (USA)	Chevrolet Corvette C7.R	M	2	5	11	359	Race 12 of 12	18	
2017	Chevrolet (USA)	Chevrolet Corvette C7.R	M	1	4	6	348	Race 12 of 12	6	
2018	Ford (USA)	Ford GT	M	3	5	8	351	Race 12 of 12	6	
2019	Porsche (DEU)	Porsche 911 RSR	M	5	6	12	358	Race 10 of 12	13	
2020	Chevrolet (USA)	Chevrolet Corvette C8.R	M	7	6	12	362	Race 11 of 11	14	
2021	Chevrolet (USA)	Chevrolet Corvette C8.R	M	10	8	17	3715	Race 12 of 12	169	

== Tire Manufacturers' Championship ==
=== GTLM ===
Winners of the GTLM Tires Manufacturers' Championship
Season	Manufacturer	Poles	Wins	Podiums	Points	Clinched	Margin	Ref(s)
2014	Michelin (FRA)	11	10	31	382	Race 12 of 13	59	
2015	Michelin (FRA)	10	9	28	347	Race 12 of 12	24	

== Michelin Endurance Cup ==
=== GTP ===
Winners of the GTP Endurance Cup Drivers' Championship
Season	Drivers	Team	Tyre	Poles	Wins	Podiums	Points	Clinched	Margin	Ref
2023	Alexander Sims (GBR)	Whelen Cadillac Racing (USA)	M	1	1	2	40	Race 11 of 11	2	
2023	Jack Aitken (GBR)	Whelen Cadillac Racing (USA)	M	1	1	2	40	Race 11 of 11	2	
2023	Pipo Derani (BRA)	Whelen Cadillac Racing (USA)	M	1	1	2	40	Race 11 of 11	2	
2024	Dane Cameron (USA)	Porsche Penske Motorsport (GER)	M	0	2	4	50	Race 11 of 11	8	
2024	Felipe Nasr (BRA)	Porsche Penske Motorsport (GER)	M	0	2	4	50	Race 11 of 11	8	
2025	Felipe Nasr (BRA)	Porsche Penske Motorsport (GER)	M	0	2	2	46	Race 11 of 11	1	
2025	Nick Tandy (GBR)	Porsche Penske Motorsport (GER)	M	0	2	2	46	Race 11 of 11	1	

=== LMP2 ===
Winners of the LMP2 Endurance Cup Drivers' Championship
Season	Drivers	Team	Tyre	Poles	Wins	Podiums	Points	Clinched	Margin	Ref
2019	Cameron Cassels (CAN)	Performance Tech Motorsports (USA)	M	1	2	4	49	Race 12 of 12	5	
2019	Kyle Masson (USA)	Performance Tech Motorsports (USA)	M	1	2	4	49	Race 12 of 12	5	
2020	Simon Trummer (DNK)	PR1/Mathiasen Motorsports (USA)	M	4	2	3	55	Race 11 of 11	18	
2021	Ben Keating (USA)	PR1/Mathiasen Motorsports (USA)	M	2	1	3	45	Race 12 of 12	3	
2021	Mikkel Jensen (DNK)	PR1/Mathiasen Motorsports (USA)	M	2	1	3	45	Race 12 of 12	3	
2021	Scott Huffaker (USA)	PR1/Mathiasen Motorsports (USA)	M	2	1	3	45	Race 12 of 12	3	
2022	Ben Keating (USA)	PR1/Mathiasen Motorsports (USA)	M	3	2	2	41	Race 12 of 12	5	
2022	Mikkel Jensen (DNK)	PR1/Mathiasen Motorsports (USA)	M	3	2	2	41	Race 12 of 12	5	
2022	Scott Huffaker (USA)	PR1/Mathiasen Motorsports (USA)	M	3	2	2	41	Race 12 of 12	5	
2023	Ben Hanley (GBR)	CrowdStrike Racing by APR (USA)	M	0	2	3	42	Race 11 of 11	3	
2023	George Kurtz (USA)	CrowdStrike Racing by APR (USA)	M	0	2	3	42	Race 11 of 11	3	
2024	Mikkel Jensen (DNK)	TDS Racing (FRA)	M	0	2	3	49	Race 11 of 11	7	
2024	Steven Thomas (USA)	TDS Racing (FRA)	M	0	2	3	49	Race 11 of 11	7	
2024	Hunter McElrea (NZL)	TDS Racing (FRA)	M	0	2	3	49	Race 11 of 11	7	
2025	Mikkel Jensen (DNK)	TDS Racing (FRA)	M	1	2	3	46	Race 11 of 11	0	
2025	Steven Thomas (USA)	TDS Racing (FRA)	M	1	2	3	46	Race 11 of 11	0	
2025	Hunter McElrea (NZL)	TDS Racing (FRA)	M	1	2	3	46	Race 11 of 11	0	

=== GTD Pro ===
Winners of the GTD Pro Endurance Cup Drivers' Championship
Season	Drivers	Team	Tyre	Poles	Wins	Podiums	Points	Clinched	Margin	Ref
2022	Daniel Serra (BRA)	Risi Competizione (USA)	M	1	0	2	35	Race 12 of 12	2	
2022	Davide Rigon (ITA)	Risi Competizione (USA)	M	1	0	2	35	Race 12 of 12	2	
2023	Jules Gounon (AND)	WeatherTech Racing (USA)	M	1	2	3	42	Race 11 of 11	4	
2023	Daniel Juncadella (ESP)	WeatherTech Racing (USA)	M	1	2	3	42	Race 11 of 11	4	
2024	Bryan Sellers (USA)	Paul Miller Racing (USA)	M	0	0	1	43	Race 11 of 11	2	
2024	Madison Snow (USA)	Paul Miller Racing (USA)	M	0	0	1	43	Race 11 of 11	2	
2024	Neil Verhagen (USA)	Paul Miller Racing (USA)	M	0	0	1	43	Race 11 of 11	2	
2025	Dan Harper (GBR)	Paul Miller Racing (USA)	M	2	2	4	52	Race 11 of 11	5	
2025	Max Hesse (GER)	Paul Miller Racing (USA)	M	2	2	4	52	Race 11 of 11	5	

=== GTD ===
Winners of the GTD Endurance Cup Drivers' Championship
Season	Drivers	Team	Tyre	Poles	Wins	Podiums	Points	Clinched	Margin	Ref
2014	Townsend Bell (USA)	AIM Autosport (CAN)	C	0	1	3	46	Round 13 of 13	13	
2014	Bill Sweedler (USA)	AIM Autosport (CAN)	C	0	1	3	46	Round 13 of 13	13	
2015	Al Carter (USA)	Riley Motorsports (USA)	C	1	2	3	45	Race 12 of 12	10	
2015	Cameron Lawrence (USA)	Riley Motorsports (USA)	C	1	2	3	45	Race 12 of 12	10	
2016	Alessandro Balzan (ITA)	Scuderia Corsa (USA)	C	0	2	3	35	Race 12 of 12	3	
2016	Christina Nielsen (DNK)	Scuderia Corsa (USA)	C	0	2	3	35	Race 12 of 12	3	
2017	Ben Keating (USA)	Riley Motorsports Team AMG (USA)	C	0	1	2	39	Race 12 of 12	3	
2017	Jeroen Bleekemolen (NLD)	Riley Motorsports Team AMG (USA)	C	0	1	2	39	Race 12 of 12	3	
2017	Mario Farnbacher (DEU)	Riley Motorsports Team AMG (USA)	C	0	1	2	39	Race 12 of 12	3	
2018	Ben Keating (USA)	Mercedes-AMG Team Riley Motorsports (USA)	C	0	0	1	40	Race 12 of 12	3	
2018	Jeroen Bleekemolen (NLD)	Mercedes-AMG Team Riley Motorsports (USA)	C	0	0	1	40	Race 12 of 12	3	
2018	Luca Stolz (DEU)	Mercedes-AMG Team Riley Motorsports (USA)	C	0	0	1	40	Race 12 of 12	3	
2019	Ben Keating (USA)	Mercedes-AMG Team Riley Motorsports (USA)	M	0	0	0	37	Race 12 of 12	2	
2019	Jeroen Bleekemolen (NLD)	Mercedes-AMG Team Riley Motorsports (USA)	M	0	0	0	37	Race 12 of 12	2	
2020	Bryan Sellers (USA)	Paul Miller Racing (USA)	M	0	1	2	44	Race 11 of 11	9	
2020	Corey Lewis (USA)	Paul Miller Racing (USA)	M	0	1	2	44	Race 11 of 11	9	
2020	Madison Snow (USA)	Paul Miller Racing (USA)	M	0	1	2	44	Race 11 of 11	9	
2021	Jan Heylen (BEL)	Wright Motorsports (USA)	M	1	0	1	40	Race 12 of 12	2	
2021	Patrick Long (USA)	Wright Motorsports (USA)	M	1	0	1	40	Race 12 of 12	2	
2021	Trent Hindman (USA)	Wright Motorsports (USA)	M	1	0	1	40	Race 12 of 12	2	
2022	Brendan Iribe (USA)	Inception Racing with Optimum Motorsport (USA)	M	0	0	2	44	Race 12 of 12	9	
2022	Jordan Pepper (RSA)	Inception Racing with Optimum Motorsport (USA)	M	0	0	2	44	Race 12 of 12	9	
2023	Kenton Koch (USA)	Team Korthoff Motorsports (USA)	M	0	0	0	39	Race 11 of 11	3	
2023	Mikaël Grenier (CAN)	Team Korthoff Motorsports (USA)	M	0	0	0	39	Race 11 of 11	3	
2023	Mike Skeen (USA)	Team Korthoff Motorsports (USA)	M	0	0	0	39	Race 11 of 11	3	
2024	Philip Ellis (SUI)	Winward Racing (USA)	M	0	3	3	41	Race 11 of 11	1	
2024	Indy Dontje (NLD)	Winward Racing (USA)	M	0	3	3	41	Race 11 of 11	1	
2024	Russell Ward (USA)	Winward Racing (USA)	M	0	3	3	41	Race 11 of 11	1	
2025	Simon Mann (USA)	AF Corse (ITA)	M	1	1	1	40	Race 11 of 11	6	
2025	Alessandro Pier Guidi (ITA)	AF Corse (ITA)	M	1	1	1	40	Race 11 of 11	6	
2025	Lilou Wadoux (FRA)	AF Corse (ITA)	M	1	1	1	40	Race 11 of 11	6	

=== Prototype ===
Winners of the Prototype Endurance Cup Drivers' Championship
Season	Drivers	Team	Tyre	Poles	Wins	Podiums	Points	Clinched	Margin	Ref
2014	João Barbosa (POR)	Action Express Racing (USA)	C	1	1	4	43	Round 13 of 13	4	
2014	Christian Fittipaldi (BRA)	Action Express Racing (USA)	C	1	1	4	43	Round 13 of 13	4	
2015	João Barbosa (POR)	Action Express Racing (USA)	C	1	2	4	45	Race 12 of 12	8	
2015	Christian Fittipaldi (BRA)	Action Express Racing (USA)	C	1	2	4	45	Race 12 of 12	8	
2016	João Barbosa (POR)	Action Express Racing (USA)	C	0	0	2	43	Race 12 of 12	2	
2016	Christian Fittipaldi (BRA)	Action Express Racing (USA)	C	0	0	2	43	Race 12 of 12	2	
2017	Christian Fittipaldi (BRA)	Mustang Sampling Racing (USA)	C	1	1	3	46	Race 12 of 12	4	
2017	Filipe Albuquerque (POR)	Mustang Sampling Racing (USA)	C	1	1	3	46	Race 12 of 12	4	
2017	João Barbosa (POR)	Mustang Sampling Racing (USA)	C	1	1	3	46	Race 12 of 12	4	
2018	Eric Curran (USA)	Whelen Engineering Racing (USA)	C	0	0	2	40	Race 12 of 12	8	
2018	Felipe Nasr (BRA)	Whelen Engineering Racing (USA)	C	0	0	2	40	Race 12 of 12	8	

=== DPi ===
Winners of the DPi Endurance Cup Drivers' Championship
Season	Drivers	Team	Tyre	Poles	Wins	Podiums	Points	Clinched	Margin	Ref
2019	Eric Curran (USA)	Whelen Engineering Racing (USA)	M	1	2	3	45	Race 12 of 12	3	
2019	Felipe Nasr (BRA)	Whelen Engineering Racing (USA)	M	1	2	3	45	Race 12 of 12	3	
2019	Pipo Derani (BRA)	Whelen Engineering Racing (USA)	M	1	2	3	45	Race 12 of 12	3	
2020	Ryan Briscoe (AUS)	Konica Minolta Cadillac DPi-V.R (USA)	M	0	2	2	42	Race 11 of 11	4	
2020	Renger van der Zande (NLD)	Konica Minolta Cadillac DPi-V.R (USA)	M	0	2	2	42	Race 11 of 11	4	
2021	Alexander Rossi (USA)	WTR-Konica Minolta Acura (USA)	M	1	1	3	45	Race 12 of 12	6	
2021	Filipe Albuquerque (POR)	WTR-Konica Minolta Acura (USA)	M	1	1	3	45	Race 12 of 12	6	
2021	Ricky Taylor (USA)	WTR-Konica Minolta Acura (USA)	M	1	1	3	45	Race 12 of 12	6	
2022	Oliver Jarvis (GBR)	Meyer Shank Racing with Curb-Agajanian (USA)	M	2	2	3	39	Race 12 of 12	0	
2022	Tom Blomqvist (GBR)	Meyer Shank Racing with Curb-Agajanian (USA)	M	2	2	3	39	Race 12 of 12	0	

=== PC ===
Winners of the PC Endurance Cup Drivers' Championship
Season	Drivers	Team	Tyre	Poles	Wins	Podiums	Points	Clinched	Margin	Ref
2014	Jon Bennett (USA)	CORE Autosport (USA)	C	2	3	4	46	Round 13 of 13	9	
2014	Colin Braun (USA)	CORE Autosport (USA)	C	2	3	4	46	Round 13 of 13	9	
2014	James Gue (USA)	CORE Autosport (USA)	C	2	3	4	46	Round 13 of 13	9	
2015	Mike Guasch (USA)	PR1/Mathiasen Motorsports (USA)	C	1	3	3	46	Race 12 of 12	9	
2015	Tom Kimber-Smith (GBR)	PR1/Mathiasen Motorsports (USA)	C	1	3	3	46	Race 12 of 12	9	
2016	Robert Alon (USA)	PR1/Mathiasen Motorsports (USA)	C	0	1	3	47	Race 12 of 12	1	
2016	Tom Kimber-Smith (GBR)	PR1/Mathiasen Motorsports (USA)	C	0	1	3	47	Race 12 of 12	1	
2016	José Gutiérrez (MEX)	PR1/Mathiasen Motorsports (USA)	C	0	1	3	47	Race 12 of 12	1	
2017	James French (USA)	Performance Tech Motorsports (USA)	C	3	3	4	56	Race 12 of 12	16	
2017	Kyle Masson (USA)	Performance Tech Motorsports (USA)	C	3	3	4	56	Race 12 of 12	16	
2017	Pato O'Ward (MEX)	Performance Tech Motorsports (USA)	C	3	3	4	56	Race 12 of 12	16	

=== LMP3 ===
Winners of the LMP3 Endurance Cup Drivers' Championship
Season	Drivers	Team	Tyre	Poles	Wins	Podiums	Points	Clinched	Margin	Ref
2021	Gar Robinson (USA)	Riley Motorsports (USA)	M	0	3	4	55	Race 12 of 12	11	
2021	Scott Andrews (AUS)	Riley Motorsports (USA)	M	0	3	4	55	Race 12 of 12	11	
2022	Felipe Fraga (BRA)	Riley Motorsports (USA)	M	2	2	2	44	Race 12 of 12	6	
2022	Gar Robinson (USA)	Riley Motorsports (USA)	M	2	2	2	44	Race 12 of 12	6	
2022	Kay van Berlo (NLD)	Riley Motorsports (USA)	M	2	2	2	44	Race 12 of 12	6	
2023	Felipe Fraga (BRA)	Riley Motorsports (USA)	M	0	2	3	42	Race 11 of 11	8	
2023	Gar Robinson (USA)	Riley Motorsports (USA)	M	0	2	3	42	Race 11 of 11	8	
2023	Josh Burdon (AUS)	Riley Motorsports (USA)	M	0	2	3	42	Race 11 of 11	8	

=== GTLM ===
Winners of the GTLM Endurance Cup Drivers' Championship
Season	Drivers	Team	Tyre	Poles	Wins	Podiums	Points	Clinched	Margin	Ref
2014	Michael Christensen (DNK)	Porsche North America (USA)	M	1	1	2	38	Round 13 of 13	4	
2014	Patrick Long (USA)	Porsche North America (USA)	M	1	1	2	38	Round 13 of 13	4	
2015	Antonio García (ESP)	Corvette Racing (USA)	M	1	2	2	39	Race 12 of 12	2	
2015	Jan Magnussen (DNK)	Corvette Racing (USA)	M	1	2	2	39	Race 12 of 12	2	
2016	Oliver Gavin (GBR)	Corvette Racing (USA)	M	0	2	3	38	Race 12 of 12	4	
2016	Tommy Milner (USA)	Corvette Racing (USA)	M	0	2	3	38	Race 12 of 12	4	
2017	Patrick Pilet (FRA)	Porsche GT Team (USA)	M	0	0	1	40	Race 12 of 12	1	
2017	Dirk Werner (GER)	Porsche GT Team (USA)	M	0	0	1	40	Race 12 of 12	1	
2018	Joey Hand (USA)	Ford Chip Ganassi Racing (USA)	M	0	1	2	42	Race 12 of 12	1	
2018	Dirk Müller (DEU)	Ford Chip Ganassi Racing (USA)	M	0	1	2	42	Race 12 of 12	1	
2019	Ryan Briscoe (AUS)	Ford Chip Ganassi Racing (USA)	M	0	0	2	38	Race 12 of 12	1	
2019	Richard Westbrook (GBR)	Ford Chip Ganassi Racing (USA)	M	0	0	2	38	Race 12 of 12	1	
2020	John Edwards (USA)	BMW Team RLL (USA)	M	0	1	4	48	Race 11 of 11	5	
2020	Jesse Krohn (FIN)	BMW Team RLL (USA)	M	0	1	4	48	Race 11 of 11	5	
2021	Nick Tandy (GBR)	Corvette Racing (USA)	M	1	0	1	44	Race 12 of 12	4	
2021	Tommy Milner (USA)	Corvette Racing (USA)	M	1	0	1	44	Race 12 of 12	4	

=== GTP ===
Winners of the GTP Endurance Cup Teams' Championship
Season	Team	Cars	Tyre	Poles	Wins	Podiums	Points	Clinched	Margin	Ref
2023	Whelen Cadillac Racing (USA)	Cadillac V-Series.R	M	1	1	2	40	Race 11 of 11	2	
2024	Porsche Penske Motorsport (GER)	Porsche 963	M	0	2	4	50	Race 11 of 11	8	
2025	Porsche Penske Motorsport (GER)	Porsche 963	M	0	2	2	46	Race 11 of 11	1	

=== LMP2 ===
Winners of the LMP2 Endurance Cup Teams' Championship
Season	Team	Cars	Tyre	Poles	Wins	Podiums	Points	Clinched	Margin	Ref
2019	Performance Tech Motorsports (USA)	Oreca 07	M	1	1	4	49	Race 12 of 12	5	
2020	PR1/Mathiasen Motorsports (USA)	Oreca 07	M	4	2	3	55	Race 11 of 11	18	
2021	PR1/Mathiasen Motorsports (USA)	Oreca 07	M	2	1	3	45	Race 12 of 12	3	
2022	PR1/Mathiasen Motorsports (USA)	Oreca 07	M	3	2	2	41	Race 12 of 12	5	
2023	CrowdStrike Racing by APR (USA)	Oreca 07	M	0	2	3	42	Race 11 of 11	3	
2024	TDS Racing (FRA)	Oreca 07	M	0	2	3	49	Race 11 of 11	7	
2025	TDS Racing (FRA)	Oreca 07	M	1	2	3	46	Race 11 of 11	0	

=== GTD Pro ===
Winners of the GTD Pro Endurance Cup Teams' Championship
Season	Team	Cars	Tyre	Poles	Wins	Podiums	Points	Clinched	Margin	Ref
2022	Risi Competizione (USA)	Ferrari 488 GT3 Evo 2020	M	1	0	2	35	Race 12 of 12	2	
2023	WeatherTech Racing (USA)	Mercedes-AMG GT3 Evo	M	1	2	3	42	Race 11 of 11	4	
2024	Paul Miller Racing (USA)	BMW M4 GT3	M	0	0	1	43	Race 11 of 11	2	
2025	Paul Miller Racing (USA)	BMW M4 GT3 Evo	M	2	2	4	52	Race 11 of 11	5	

=== GTD ===
Winners of the GTD Endurance Cup Teams' Championship
Season	Team	Cars	Tyre	Poles	Wins	Podiums	Points	Clinched	Margin	Ref
2014	AIM Autosport (CAN)	Ferrari 458 Italia GT3	C	0	1	3	46	Round 13 of 13	13	
2015	Riley Motorsports (USA)	Dodge Viper GT3-R	C	1	2	3	45	Race 12 of 12	10	
2016	Magnus Racing (USA)	Audi R8 LMS GT3	C	0	1	2	38	Race 12 of 12	3	
2017	Riley Motorsports Team AMG (USA)	Mercedes-AMG GT3	C	0	1	2	40	Race 12 of 12	4	
2018	Mercedes-AMG Team Riley Motorsports (USA)	Mercedes-AMG GT3	C	0	0	1	31	Race 12 of 12	2	
2019	Mercedes-AMG Team Riley Motorsports (USA)	Mercedes-AMG GT3	M	0	0	0	37	Race 12 of 12	2	
2020	Paul Miller Racing (USA)	Lamborghini Huracán GT3 Evo	M	0	1	2	44	Race 11 of 11	9	
2021	Wright Motorsports (USA)	Porsche 911 GT3 R	M	1	0	1	40	Race 12 of 12	2	
2022	Inception Racing with Optimum Motorsport (USA)	McLaren 720S GT3	M	0	0	2	44	Race 12 of 12	9	
2023	Team Korthoff Motorsports (USA)	Mercedes-AMG GT3 Evo	M	0	0	0	39	Race 11 of 11	3	
2024	Winward Racing (USA)	Mercedes-AMG GT3 Evo	M	0	3	3	41	Race 11 of 11	1	
2025	AF Corse (ITA)	Ferrari 296 GT3	M	1	1	1	40	Race 11 of 11	6	

=== Prototype ===
Winners of the Prototype Endurance Cup Teams' Championship
Season	Team	Cars	Tyre	Poles	Wins	Podiums	Points	Clinched	Margin	Ref
2014	Action Express Racing (USA)	Chevrolet Corvette DP	C	1	1	4	43	Round 13 of 13	4	
2015	Action Express Racing (USA)	Chevrolet Corvette DP	C	1	2	4	45	Race 12 of 12	10	
2016	Action Express Racing (USA)	Chevrolet Corvette DP	C	0	0	2	43	Race 12 of 12	2	
2017	Mustang Sampling Racing (USA)	Cadillac DPi-V.R	C	1	1	3	47	Race 12 of 12	5	
2018	Whelen Engineering Racing (USA)	Cadillac DPi-V.R	C	0	0	2	40	Race 12 of 12	8	

=== DPi ===
Winners of the DPi Endurance Cup Teams' Championship
Season	Team	Cars	Tyre	Poles	Wins	Podiums	Points	Clinched	Margin	Ref
2019	Whelen Engineering Racing (USA)	Cadillac DPi-V.R	M	1	2	3	45	Race 12 of 12	3	
2020	Konica Minolta Cadillac DPi-V.R (USA)	Cadillac DPi-V.R	M	0	2	2	42	Race 11 of 11	6	
2021	WTR-Konica Minolta Acura (USA)	Acura ARX-05	M	1	1	3	45	Race 12 of 12	6	
2022	Meyer Shank Racing with Curb-Agajanian (USA)	Acura ARX-05	M	2	2	3	39	Race 12 of 12	0	

=== PC ===
Winners of the PC Endurance Cup Teams' Championship
Season	Team	Cars	Tyre	Poles	Wins	Podiums	Points	Clinched	Margin	Ref
2014	CORE Autosport (USA)	Oreca FLM09	C	2	3	4	46	Round 13 of 13	9	
2015	PR1/Mathiasen Motorsports (USA)	Oreca FLM09	C	1	3	3	46	Race 12 of 12	9	
2016	PR1/Mathiasen Motorsports (USA)	Oreca FLM09	C	0	1	3	47	Race 12 of 12	9	
2017	Performance Tech Motorsports (USA)	Oreca FLM09	C	3	3	4	56	Race 12 of 12	14	

=== LMP3 ===
Winners of the LMP3 Endurance Cup Teams' Championship
Season	Team	Cars	Tyre	Poles	Wins	Podiums	Points	Clinched	Margin	Ref
2021	Riley Motorsports (USA)	Ligier JS P320	M	0	3	4	55	Race 12 of 12	11	
2022	Riley Motorsports (USA)	Ligier JS P320	M	2	2	2	44	Race 12 of 12	6	
2023	Riley Motorsports (USA)	Ligier JS P320	M	0	2	3	42	Race 11 of 11	8	

=== GTLM ===
Winners of the GTLM Endurance Cup Teams' Championship
Season	Team	Cars	Tyre	Poles	Wins	Podiums	Points	Clinched	Margin	Ref
2014	Porsche North America (USA)	Porsche 911 RSR	M	1	1	2	38	Round 13 of 13	4	
2015	Corvette Racing (USA)	Chevrolet Corvette C7.R	M	1	2	2	39	Race 12 of 12	2	
2016	Corvette Racing (USA)	Chevrolet Corvette C7.R	M	0	2	3	38	Race 12 of 12	6	
2017	Porsche GT Team (USA)	Porsche 911 RSR	M	0	0	1	40	Race 12 of 12	1	
2018	Ford Chip Ganassi Racing (USA)	Ford GT	M	0	1	2	42	Race 12 of 12	1	
2019	Ford Chip Ganassi Racing (USA)	Ford GT	M	0	0	2	38	Race 12 of 12	1	
2020	BMW Team RLL (USA)	BMW M8 GTE	M	0	1	4	48	Race 11 of 11	5	
2021	Corvette Racing (USA)	Chevrolet Corvette C8.R	M	1	0	1	44	Race 12 of 12	4	

=== GTP ===
Winners of the GTP Endurance Cup Teams' Championship
Season	Team	Cars	Tyre	Poles	Wins	Podiums	Points	Clinched	Margin	Ref
2023	Cadillac (USA)	Cadillac V-Series.R	M	1	1	3	53	Race 11 of 11	7	
2024	Porsche (DEU)	Porsche 963	M	0	2	7	60	Race 11 of 11	9	
2025	Porsche (DEU)	Porsche 963	M	0	2	5	57	Race 11 of 11	5	

=== GTD Pro ===
Winners of the GTD Pro Endurance Cup Manufacturers' Championship
Season	Manufacturer	Cars	Tyre	Poles	Wins	Podiums	Points	Clinched	Margin	Ref(s)
2022	Porsche (DEU)	Porsche 911 GT3 R	M	0	1	4	39	Race 12 of 12	3	
2023	Mercedes-AMG (DEU)	Mercedes-AMG GT3 Evo	M	1	2	3	42	Race 11 of 11	4	
2024	Chevrolet (USA)	Chevrolet Corvette Z06 GT3.R	M	1	0	2	40	Race 11 of 11	1	
2025	BMW (DEU)	BMW M4 GT3 Evo	M	2	2	5	65	Race 10 of 11	25	

=== GTD ===
Winners of the GTD Endurance Cup Manufacturers' Championship
Season	Manufacturer	Cars	Tyre	Poles	Wins	Podiums	Points	Clinched	Margin	Ref(s)
2014	Ferrari (ITA)	Ferrari 458 Italia GT3	C	1	1	3	48	Round 13 of 13	8	
2015	Porsche (DEU)	Porsche 911 GT America	C	0	2	5	48	Race 12 of 12	0	
2016	Audi (DEU)	Audi R8 LMS GT3	C	0	1	3	45	Race 12 of 12	3	
2017	Mercedes-AMG (DEU)	Mercedes-AMG GT3	C	1	1	3	44	Race 12 of 12	5	
2018	Mercedes-AMG (DEU)	Mercedes-AMG GT3	C	0	0	1	41	Race 12 of 12	1	
2019	Mercedes-AMG (DEU)	Mercedes-AMG GT3	M	0	0	0	37	Race 12 of 12	1	
2020	Lamborghini (ITA)	Lamborghini Huracán GT3 Evo	M	0	1	3	47	Race 9 of 11	12	
2021	Porsche (DEU)	Porsche 911 GT3 R	M	1	1	3	48	Race 12 of 12	10	
2022	McLaren (GBR)	McLaren 720S GT3	M	0	0	2	44	Race 12 of 12	7	
2023	Mercedes-AMG (DEU)	Mercedes-AMG GT3 Evo	M	1	0	0	42	Race 11 of 11	2	
2024	Mercedes-AMG (DEU)	Mercedes-AMG GT3 Evo	M	2	3	4	53	Race 10 of 11	15	
2025	Ferrari (ITA)	Ferrari 296 GT3	M	2	2	5	61	Race 10 of 11	22	

=== Prototype ===
Winners of the Prototype Endurance Cup Manufacturers' Championship
Season	Manufacturer	Cars	Tyre	Poles	Wins	Podiums	Points	Clinched	Margin	Ref(s)
2014	Chevrolet (USA)	Chevrolet Corvette DP	C	3	3	7	53	Round 13 of 13	7	
2015	Chevrolet (USA)	Chevrolet Corvette DP	C	2	3	9	52	Race 12 of 12	6	
2016	Honda (JPN)	Ligier JS P2	C	3	3	5	55	Race 12 of 12	2	
2017	Cadillac (USA)	Cadillac DPi-V.R	C	1	3	7	56	Race 12 of 12	7	
2018	Cadillac (USA)	Cadillac DPi-V.R	C	2	2	5	53	Race 12 of 12	8	

=== DPi ===
Winners of the DPi Endurance Cup Manufacturers' Championship
Season	Manufacturer	Cars	Tyre	Poles	Wins	Podiums	Points	Clinched	Margin	Ref(s)
2019	Cadillac (USA)	Cadillac DPi-V.R	M	1	3	7	56	Race 12 of 12	11	
2020	Cadillac (USA)	Cadillac DPi-V.R	M	0	2	4	54	Race 11 of 11	8	
2021	Acura (JPN)	Acura ARX-05	M	1	1	5	51	Race 12 of 12	3	
2022	Acura (JPN)	Acura ARX-05	M	2	3	5	55	Race 12 of 12	2	

=== GTLM ===
Winners of the GTLM Endurance Cup Manufacturers' Championship
Season	Manufacturer	Cars	Tyre	Poles	Wins	Podiums	Points	Clinched	Margin	Ref(s)
2014	Porsche (DEU)	Porsche 911 RSR	M/F	2	3	4	51	Round 13 of 13	7	
2015	Chevrolet (USA)	Chevrolet Corvette C7.R	M	2	2	4	46	Race 12 of 12	1	
2016	Chevrolet (USA)	Chevrolet Corvette C7.R	M	0	2	4	42	Race 12 of 12	2	
2017	Ford (USA)	Ford GT	M	3	1	3	45	Race 12 of 12	1	
2018	Ford (USA)	Ford GT	M	1	2	3	48	Race 12 of 12	3	
2019	Ford (USA)	Ford GT	M	0	0	3	42	Race 12 of 12	2	
2020	BMW (DEU)	BMW M8 GTE	M	0	2	5	53	Race 11 of 11	3	
2021	Chevrolet (USA)	Chevrolet Corvette C8.R	M	3	2	3	53	Race 12 of 12	4	

== WeatherTech Sprint Cup ==
=== Drivers' Championship ===
Winners of the GTD WeatherTech Sprint Cup Drivers' Championship
Season	Drivers	Team	Tyre	Poles	Wins	Podiums	Points	Clinched	Margin	Ref
2019	Zacharie Robichon (CAN)	Pfaff Motorsports (CAN)	M	2	2	3	203	Race 11 of 12	6	
2020	Aaron Telitz (USA)	AIM Vasser Sullivan (USA)	M	3	3	4	206	Race 10 of 11	7	
2020	Jack Hawksworth (GBR)	AIM Vasser Sullivan (USA)	M	3	3	4	206	Race 10 of 11	7	
2021	Roman De Angelis (CAN)	Heart of Racing Team (USA)	M	1	2	3	2539	Race 11 of 12	19	
2021	Ross Gunn (GBR)	Heart of Racing Team (USA)	M	1	2	3	2539	Race 11 of 12	19	
2022	Bryan Sellers (USA)	Paul Miller Racing (USA)	M	2	2	5	2673	Race 11 of 12	226	
2022	Madison Snow (USA)	Paul Miller Racing (USA)	M	2	2	5	2673	Race 11 of 12	226	
2023	Bryan Sellers (USA)	Paul Miller Racing (USA)	M	3	4	5	2355	Race 10 of 11	259	
2023	Madison Snow (USA)	Paul Miller Racing (USA)	M	3	4	5	2355	Race 10 of 11	259	

=== Teams' Championship ===
Winners of the GTD WeatherTech Sprint Cup Teams' Championship
Season	Team	Cars	Tyre	Poles	Wins	Podiums	Points	Clinched	Margin	Ref
2019	Meyer Shank Racing with Curb-Agajanian (USA)	Acura NSX GT3 Evo	M	1	0	4	197	Race 11 of 12	1	
2020	AIM Vasser Sullivan (USA)	Lexus RC F GT3	M	3	3	4	206	Race 10 of 11	7	
2021	Heart of Racing Team (USA)	Aston Martin Vantage GT3	M	1	2	3	2539	Race 11 of 12	19	
2022	Paul Miller Racing (USA)	BMW M4 GT3	M	2	2	5	2673	Race 11 of 12	226	
2023	Paul Miller Racing (USA)	BMW M4 GT3	M	3	4	5	2355	Race 10 of 11	259	

=== Manufacturers' Championship ===
Winners of the GTD WeatherTech Sprint Cup Manufacturers' Championship
Season	Manufacturer	Cars	Tyre	Poles	Wins	Podiums	Points	Clinched	Margin	Ref(s)
2019	Porsche (DEU)	Porsche 911 GT3 R	M	2	2	3	216	Race 11 of 12	15	
2020	Lexus (JPN)	Lexus RC F GT3	M	4	4	6	223	Race 10 of 11	13	
2021	Lamborghini (ITA)	Lamborghini Huracán GT3 Evo	M	2	1	6	2652	Race 11 of 12	10	
2022	BMW (DEU)	BMW M4 GT3	M	3	3	7	2763	Race 11 of 12	122	
2023	BMW (DEU)	BMW M4 GT3	M	3	4	7	2540	Race 10 of 11	283	

== VP Fuels Front Runner Award ==
=== GTP ===
Season	Team	Cars	Tyre	Poles	Wins	Podiums	Points	Clinched	Margin	Ref
2023	Cadillac Racing (USA)	Cadillac V-Series.R	M	0	0	1	1	Race 11 of 11	0	
2024	Porsche Penske Motorsport (GER)	Porsche 963	M	0	1	3	2	Race 11 of 11	1	
2025	Cadillac Whelen (USA)	Cadillac V-Series.R	M	1	2	2	3	Race 11 of 11	2	

=== LMP2 ===
Season	Team	Cars	Tyre	Poles	Wins	Podiums	Points	Clinched	Margin	Ref
2019	PR1/Mathiasen Motorsports (USA)	Oreca 07	M	2	5	5	5	Race 9 of 12	5	
2020	PR1/Mathiasen Motorsports (USA)	Oreca 07	M	4	3	3	4	Race 10 of 11	4	
2021	PR1/Mathiasen Motorsports (USA)	Oreca 07	M	4	2	4	2	Race 12 of 12	1	
2022	Tower Motorsport (USA)	Oreca 07	M	0	1	3	1	Race 12 of 12	0	
2023	CrowdStrike Racing by APR (USA)	Oreca 07	M	1	1	2	1	Race 11 of 11	0	
2024	TDS Racing (FRA)	Oreca 07	M	0	2	3	2	Race 11 of 11	0	
2025	AO Racing (USA)	Oreca 07	M	2	2	3	2	Race 11 of 11	1	

=== GTD Pro ===
Season	Team	Cars	Tyre	Poles	Wins	Podiums	Points	Clinched	Margin	Ref
2022	Pfaff Motorsports (CAN)	Porsche 911 GT3 R	M	2	3	6	2	Race 12 of 12	0	
2023	Vasser Sullivan Racing (USA)	Lexus RC F GT3	M	3	0	4	2	Race 11 of 11	0	
2024	Paul Miller Racing (USA)	BMW M4 GT3	M	1	1	2	1	Race 11 of 11	0	
2025	Paul Miller Racing (USA)	BMW M4 GT3 Evo	M	2	2	3	2	Race 11 of 11	0	

=== GTD ===
Season	Team	Cars	Tyre	Poles	Wins	Podiums	Points	Clinched	Margin	Ref
2017	Michael Shank Racing with Curb-Agajanian (USA)	Acura NSX GT3	C	1	1	3	1	Race 12 of 12	0	
2018	Mercedes-AMG Team Riley Motorsports (USA)	Mercedes-AMG GT3	C	0	1	2	3	Race 12 of 12	2	
2019	Meyer Shank Racing with Curb-Agajanian (USA)	Acura NSX GT3 Evo	M	2	1	4	2	Race 12 of 12	0	
2020	Paul Miller Racing (USA)	Lamborghini Huracán GT3 Evo	M	0	0	1	2	Race 11 of 11	1	
2021	Heart of Racing Team (USA)	Aston Martin Vantage GT3	M	0	2	3	2	Race 12 of 12	0	
2022	Winward Racing (USA)	Mercedes-AMG GT3 Evo	M	1	2	3	2	Race 12 of 12	1	
2023	Paul Miller Racing (USA)	BMW M4 GT3	M	3	3	4	4	Race 10 of 11	3	
2024	Korthoff/Preston Motorsports (USA)	Mercedes-AMG GT3 Evo	M	2	1	2	2	Race 11 of 11	1	
2025	Vasser Sullivan Racing (USA)	Lexus RC F GT3	M	2	0	2	2	Race 11 of 11	1	

=== Prototype ===
Season	Team	Cars	Tyre	Poles	Wins	Podiums	Points	Clinched	Margin	Ref
2017	Wayne Taylor Racing (USA)	Cadillac DPi-V.R	C	2	0	2	3	Race 11 of 12	2	
2018	Acura Team Penske (USA)	Acura ARX-05	C	1	0	2	2	Race 12 of 12	1	

=== DPi ===
Season	Team	Cars	Tyre	Poles	Wins	Podiums	Points	Clinched	Margin	Ref
2019	Mazda Team Joest (GER)	Mazda RT24-P	M	0	2	3	3	Race 12 of 12	2	
2020	Acura Team Penske (USA)	Acura ARX-05	M	2	0	3	4	Race 11 of 11	3	
2021	Whelen Engineering Racing (USA)	Cadillac DPi-V.R	M	3	3	5	3	Race 10 of 12	2	
2022	WTR-Konica Minolta Acura (USA)	Acura ARX-05	M	1	2	2	3	Race 12 of 12	2	

=== PC ===
Season	Team	Cars	Tyre	Poles	Wins	Podiums	Points	Clinched	Margin	Ref
2017	Performance Tech Motorsports (USA)	Oreca FLM09	C	4	3	4	3	Race 9 of 12	2	

=== LMP3 ===
Season	Team	Cars	Tyre	Poles	Wins	Podiums	Points	Clinched	Margin	Ref
2021	Riley Motorsports (USA)	Ligier JS P320	M	0	2	3	1	Race 12 of 12	0	
2022	Riley Motorsports (USA)	Ligier JS P320	M	1	2	2	3	Race 10 of 12	2	
2023	AWA (CAN)	Duqueine M30 - D-08	M	0	1	1	1	Race 11 of 11	0	

=== GTLM ===
Season	Team	Cars	Tyre	Poles	Wins	Podiums	Points	Clinched	Margin	Ref
2017	BMW Team RLL (USA)	BMW M6 GTLM	M	0	3	3	4	Race 11 of 12	3	
2018	Porsche GT Team (USA)	Porsche 911 RSR	M	1	1	2	2	Race 12 of 12	1	
2019	Porsche GT Team (USA)	Porsche 911 RSR	M	0	2	3	2	Race 12 of 12	0	
2020	BMW Team RLL (USA)	BMW M8 GTE	M	0	0	4	2	Race 11 of 11	1	
2021	Corvette Racing (USA)	Chevrolet Corvette C8.R	M	1	3	6	4	Race 11 of 12	2	

== Jim Trueman Award ==
=== Prototype ===
Season	Driver	Team	Tyre	Poles	Wins	Podiums	Points	Clinched	Margin	Ref
2017	Misha Goikhberg (CAN)	JDC-Miller MotorSports (USA)	C	0	0	2	2462		1624	
2018	Misha Goikhberg (CAN)	JDC-Miller MotorSports (USA)	C	0	1	2	3255		262	

=== LMP2 ===
Season	Driver	Team	Tyre	Poles	Wins	Podiums	Points	Clinched	Margin	Ref
2019	Cameron Cassels (CAN)	Performance Tech Motorsports (USA)	M	4	1	8	277		242	
2020	Patrick Kelly (USA)	PR1/Mathiasen Motorsports (USA)	M	6	4	4	196		73	
2021	Ben Keating (USA)	PR1/Mathiasen Motorsports (USA)	M	5	3	6	2230	Race 12 of 12	40	
2022	John Farano (CAN)	Tower Motorsport (USA)	M	0	2	5	2160		220	
2023	George Kurtz (USA)	CrowdStrike Racing by APR (USA)	M	2	2	5	2120	Race 11 of 11	50	
2024	Nick Boulle (USA)	Inter Europol by PR1/Mathiasen Motorsports (POL)	M	1	1	3	2020	Race 11 of 11	30	
2025	P.J. Hyett (USA)	AO Racing (USA)	M	2	2	3	2254	Race 11 of 11	100	

== Bob Akin Award ==
=== GTD ===
Season	Driver	Team	Tyre	Poles	Wins	Podiums	Points	Clinched	Margin	Ref
2017	Ben Keating (USA)	Riley Motorsports Team AMG (USA)	C	0	2	4	2341		440	
2018	Ben Keating (USA)	Mercedes-AMG Team Riley Motorsports (USA)	C	0	1	3	3278		115	
2019	Richard Heistand (USA)	AIM Vasser Sullivan (CAN)	M	1	2	2	316	Race 12 of 12	2	
2020	Ryan Hardwick (USA)	Wright Motorsports (USA)	M	1	1	4	333	Race 11 of 11	23	
2021	Rob Ferriol (USA)	Team Hardpoint EBM (USA)	M	0	0	0	3090	Race 12 of 12	110	
2022	Ryan Hardwick (USA)	Wright Motorsports (USA)	M	1	2	2	3590		1,460	
2023	Brendan Iribe (USA)	Inception Racing (GBR)	M	0	0	3	3240	Race 11 of 11	20	
2024	Orey Fidani (CAN)	AWA (CAN)	M	0	0	0	3040	Race 11 of 11	100	
2025	Orey Fidani (CAN)	AWA (CAN)	M	0	1	1	3280	Race 11 of 11	90	
