= Nick Boulle =

American-British racing driver (born 1989)

Nicholas Boulle
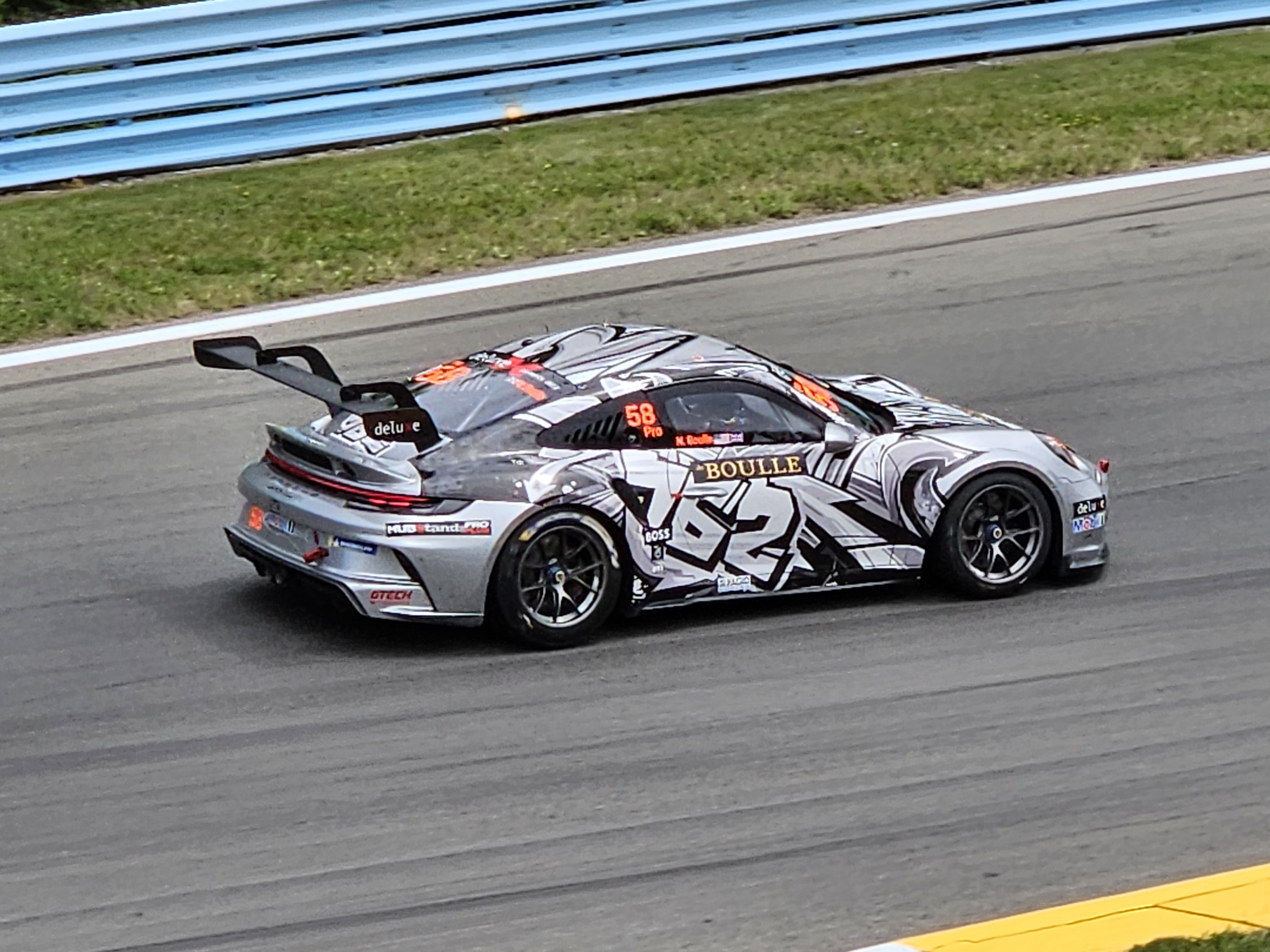
- Boulle at Watkins Glen International in 2023
- Nationality: (United States) American; (United Kingdom) British; via dual nationality
- Born: Nicholas Bernard Wilkie Boulle; October 23, 1989 (age 37) Dallas, Texas, U.S.
- Debut season: 2005
- Categorisation: FIA Silver (until 2022); FIA Bronze (2023–)

Awards
- 2024: Jim Trueman Award

Nicholas Bernard Wilkie Boulle (born March 28, 1989) is an American and British professional racing driver, athlete, entrepreneur and jeweler from Dallas, Texas, who is currently competing for United Autosports in the 2025 IMSA SportsCar Championship and for Inter Europol Competition in the 2025 24 Hours of Le Mans.

== Racing career ==
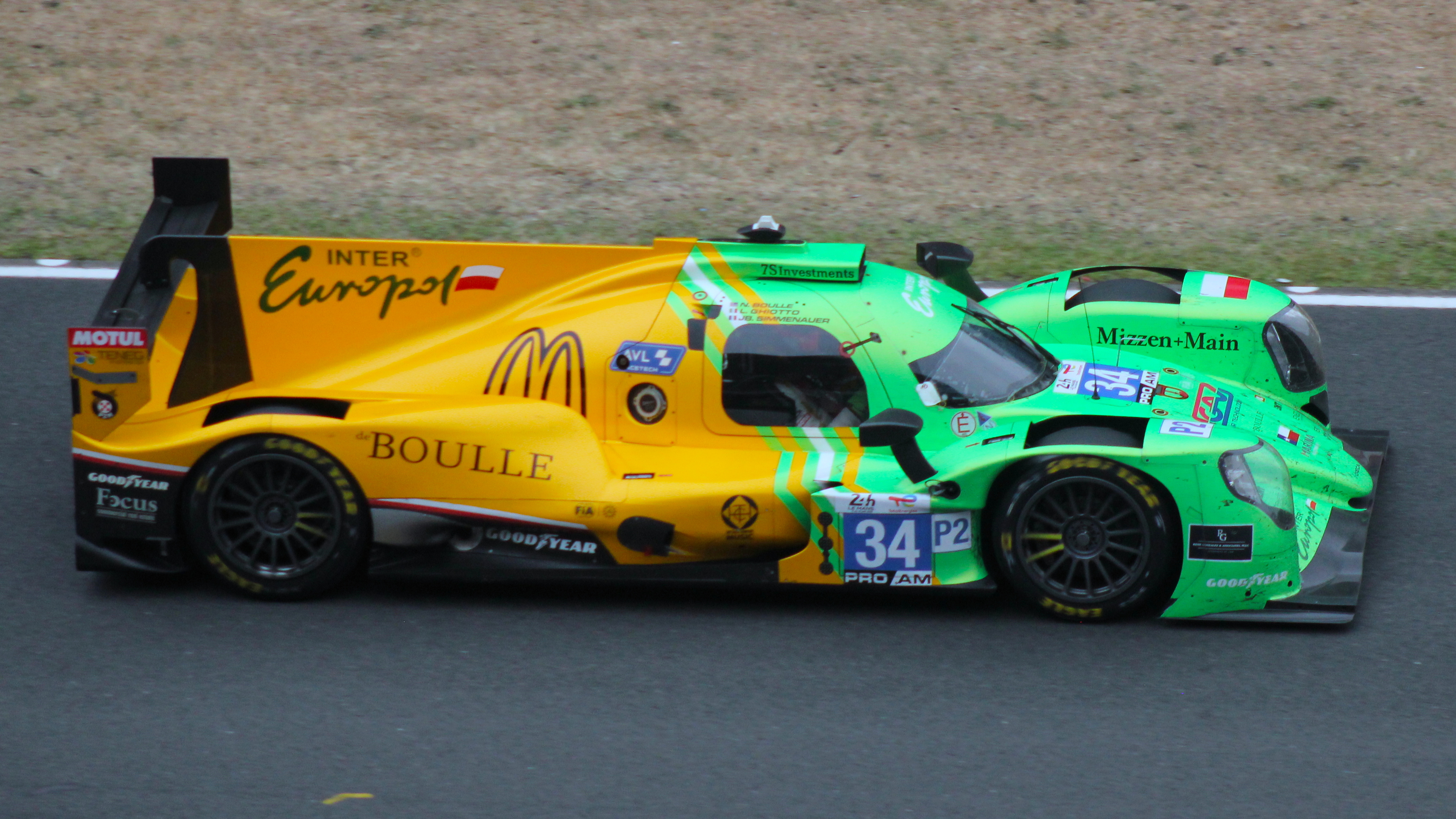
Boulle's No. 34 car at the 2025 24 Hours of Le Mans

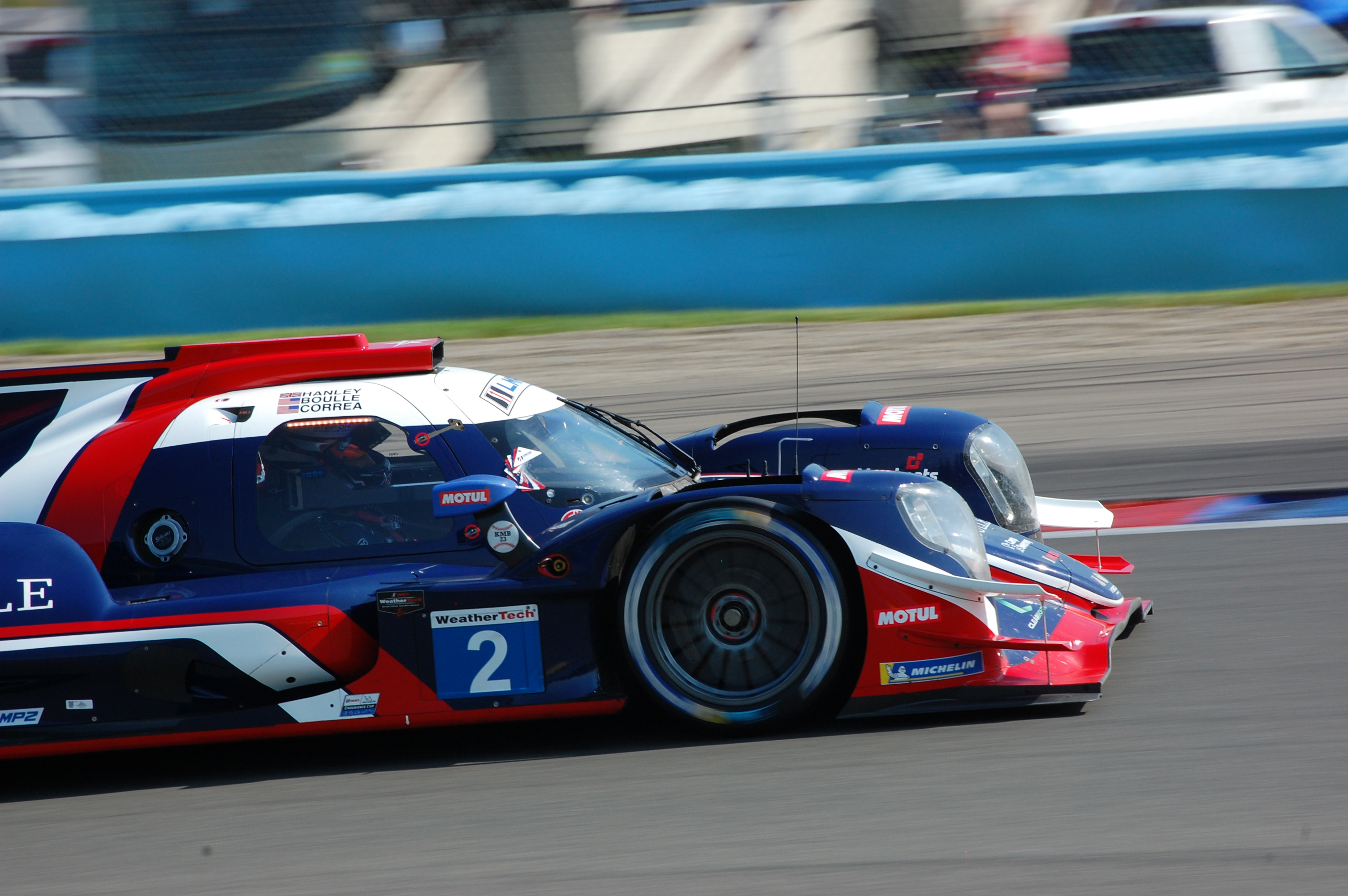
Boulle at Watkins Glen in 2025

Boulle began racing go karts at the age of 12 and went on to compete nationally as an official VW Motorsport Junior Driver. In 2016, he earned a second-place finish at the ROLEX 24 Hours of Daytona in the PC class with PR1 Motorsports where he drove alongside Jose Gutierrez, Robert Alon and Tom Kimbersmith. Later that year, he placed third in PC (Prototype Challenge) in the Lone Star Le Mans with co-driver James French. In January 2017, Boulle became the first ever Rolex dealer to win the ROLEX 24 Hours of Daytona Prototype Challenge. His team was composed of Kyle Masson, Patricio O'Ward and James French. He then came in second place in the IMSA Weather Tech Sports Car Championship at Circuit of the Americas.

In 2018, Boulle raced for a third time in the ROLEX 24 Hours of Daytona and came in 12th in his class. A few months later, Boulle debuted in the 24 Hours of Le Mans as a part of Jackie Chan DC Racing’s team, alongside drivers David Cheng and Pierre Nicolet. The team came in eighth in the LMP2 class.

== Personal life ==
Boulle graduated from Southern Methodist University and earned his BBA at the Cox School of Business. For several years he competed with the Elbowz Racing Elite Cycling Team and was medaled at the USA Cycling Collegiate National Cycling Championship for SMU Cycling in the D2 division. After University, he founded a digital marketing firm called WowBirds, and in 2015, began working at his family’s business, de Boulle Diamond & Jewelry.

== Racing record ==
=== American Open-Wheel racing results ===
(key) (Races in bold indicate pole position, races in italics indicate fastest race lap)

==== Complete USF2000 National Championship results ====
Year	Entrant	1	2	3	4	5	6	7	8	9	10	11	12	Pos	Points
2005	Cape Motorsports	ATL1; 26	ATL2; 30	MOH1; 7	MOH2; 11	CLE1; 10	CLE2; 16	ROA1; 29	ROA2; 15	MOH3; 5	MOH4; 9	VIR1; 3	VIR2; 8	10th	113

=== Complete 24 Hours of Le Mans results ===
Year	Team	Co-Drivers	Car	Class	Laps	Pos.	Class Pos.
2018	(China) Jackie Chan DC Racing	(China) David Cheng (France) Pierre Nicolet	Oreca 07-Gibson	LMP2	355	12th	8th
2019	(France) Larbre Compétition	(France) Erwin Creed (France) Romano Ricci	Ligier JS P217-Gibson	LMP2	355	17th	12th
2025	(Poland) Inter Europol Competition	(Italy) Luca Ghiotto (France) Jean-Baptiste Simmenauer	Oreca 07-Gibson	LMP2	363	27th	10th
2025	(Poland) Inter Europol Competition	(Italy) Luca Ghiotto (France) Jean-Baptiste Simmenauer	Oreca 07-Gibson	LMP2 Pro-Am	363	27th	5th

=== Complete WeatherTech SportsCar Championship results ===
(key) (Races in bold indicate pole position; results in italics indicate fastest lap)

Year	Team	Class	Make	Engine	1	2	3	4	5	6	7	8	9	10	11	12	Pos.	Points	Ref
2016	PR1/Mathiasen Motorsports	PC	Oreca FLM09	Chevrolet LS3 6.2 L V8	DAY; 2	SEB	LBH	LGA	BEL	WGL	MOS	LIM	ELK		ATL		17th	64	
2016	Performance Tech Motorsports	PC	Oreca FLM09	Chevrolet LS3 6.2 L V8										AUS; 3			17th	64	
2017	Performance Tech Motorsports	PC	Oreca FLM09	Chevrolet LS3 6.2 L V8	DAY; 1	SEB			DET	WGL		ELK	PET				9th	68	
2017	BAR1 Motorsports	PC	Oreca FLM09	Chevrolet LS3 6.2 L V8				COA; 2									9th	68	
2017	PR1/Mathiasen Motorsports	P	Ligier JS P217	Gibson GK428 4.2 L V8			LBH		DET	WGL	MOS; 8	ELK	LGA	PET			34th	23	
2018	AFS/PR1 Mathiasen Motorsports	P	Ligier JS P217	Gibson GK428 4.2 L V8	DAY; 12	SEB	LBH	MOH	DET	WGL	MOS	ELK	LGA				44th	36	
2018	Performance Tech Motorsports	P	Oreca 07	Gibson GK428 4.2 L V8										PET; 14			44th	36	
2019	Park Place Motorsports	GTD	Porsche 911 GT3 R	Porsche 4.0 L Flat-6	DAY; 7	SEB; 6	MDO	DET	WGL; 13	MOS	LIM	ELK	VIR	LGA	PET		36th	67	
2020	PR1/Mathiasen Motorsports	LMP2	Oreca 07	Gibson GK428 4.2 L V8	DAY; 2†	SEB	ELK	ATL	PET	LGA	SEB						NC†	0†	
2022	Team Hardpoint	GTD	Porsche 911 GT3 R	Porsche MA1.76/MDG.G 4.0 L Flat-6	DAY; 10	SEB	LBH	LGA	MOH	DET	WGL	MOS	LIM	ELK	VIR	PET; 12	42nd	435	
2023	FastMD Racing	LMP3	Duqueine M30 - D08	Nissan VK56DE 5.6 L V8	DAY; 6†	SEB	WGL	MOS	ELK	IMS	PET						NC†	0†	
2024	Inter Europol by PR1/Mathiasen Motorsports	LMP2	Oreca 07	Gibson GK428 4.2 L V8	DAY; 4	SEB; 6	WGL; 3	MOS; 1	ELK; 7	**IMS**; 2	PET; 4						1st	2227	
2025	United Autosports	LMP2	Oreca 07	Gibson GK428 4.2 L V8	DAY; 11	SEB; 5	WGL; 10		ELK	**IMS**; 6	PET; 9						16th	1574	
2025	PR1/Mathiasen Motorsports	LMP2	Oreca 07	Gibson GK428 4.2 L V8				MOS; 5									16th	1574	
2026	Era Motorsport	LMP2	Oreca 07	Gibson GK428 4.2 L V8	DAY	SEB	WGL	MOS	ELK	IMS; 1	PET						30th	374	

^{†} Points only counted towards the Michelin Endurance Cup, and not the overall LMP2 Championship.

^{†} Points only counted towards the Michelin Endurance Cup, and not the overall LMP3 Championship.
