= PR1/Mathiasen Motorsports =

American racing team

(United States) PR1/Mathiasen Motorsports
- Founded: 1990
- Base: Fresno, California, United States
- Team principal(s): Bobby Oergel (owner, director); Ray Mathiasen
- Current series: IMSA SportsCar Championship
- Former series: American Le Mans Series; Rolex Sports Car Series; Indy Pro 2000 Championship
- Current drivers: IMSA SportsCar Championship: 52 (Denmark) Benjamin Pedersen (United States) Naveen Rao (United States) Logan Sargeant
- Drivers' Championships: 2021 IMSA SportsCar Championship – LMP2; 2020 IMSA SportsCar Championship – LMP2; 2019 IMSA SportsCar Championship – LMP2

PR1/Mathiasen Motorsports is an American sports car racing team that currently competes in the LMP2 class of the WeatherTech SportsCar Championship.

== History ==
=== American Le Mans Series ===
PR1 Motorsports logo

PR1/Mathiasen Motorsports began entering the series with the advent of the LMPC class in 2010, fielding a full-time entry for a revolving door of drivers. The team would achieve a best finish of second on three occasions that season, at Lime Rock, Mid-Ohio, and Road America. The following season, the team notched their first series victory at Road America, before taking class victory at Petit Le Mans to close out the season. After a 2012 season which saw the team win just one race, the 2013 season saw the team claim class victory at the 12 Hours of Sebring and mount a title challenge, falling six points short and finishing third in the team's championship, but with season-long driver Mike Guasch taking the drivers' title. Guasch, PR1's first full-season competitor in their ALMS career, was awarded the championship on a recount, after it was determined the 8Star Motorsports entry that had finished ahead of the team was not eligible for full-season points.

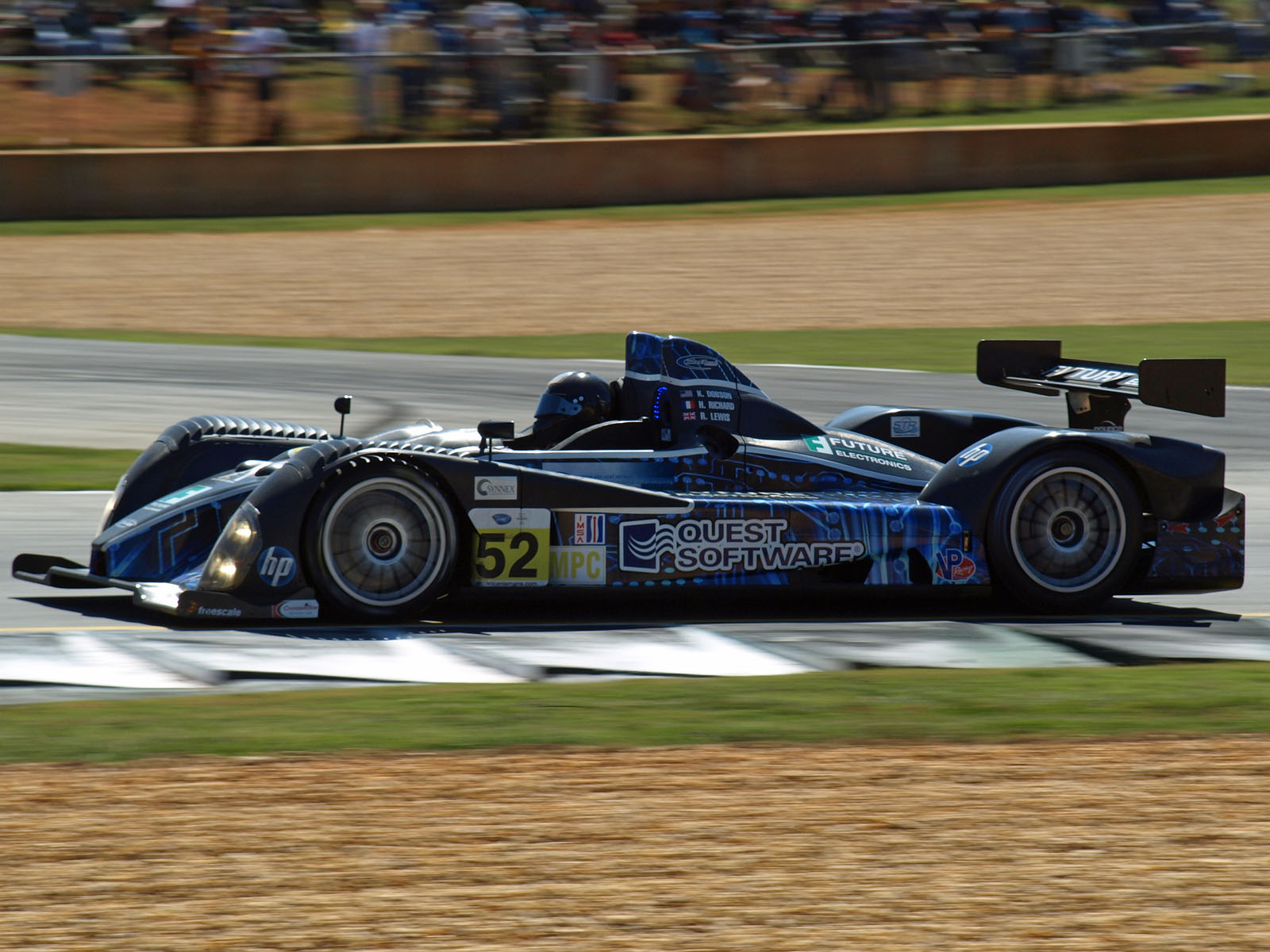
PR1/Mathiasen Motorsports' Oreca FLM09 at Petit Le Mans in 2011

=== WeatherTech SportsCar Championship ===
The team maintained their level of competitiveness as the series merged to form the United SportsCar Championship. In its opening season, the team finished fourth in the team's and driver's championships with duo Gunnar Jeannette and Frankie Montecalvo, collecting podium finishes at Watkins Glen and Petit Le Mans. The 2015 began exceptionally for the team, taking class honors at both the 24 Hours of Daytona and 12 Hours of Sebring. Although retirements at the following two races at Laguna Seca and Detroit would derail the team's title chances, another class victory at Petit Le Mans, the second in team history, would see the team claim the North American Endurance Cup title in the PC class. In 2016, the team mounted their strongest title challenge yet, claiming the North American Endurance Cup for the second year running, but missing out on the PC class title on a races won tiebreaker with Starworks Motorsport.

2017 brought about the introduction of the revised Global LMP2 specifications, and the overhaul of the series' Prototype category. As a result, the team stepped away from PC competition to field a Ligier JS P217 in the championship's new top class. In their maiden season with the car, the team registered a best finish of fourth at Watkins Glen in July. The following season, PR1 entered their Ligier in a partnership with IndyCar team AFS Racing, with Colombian duo Sebastián Saavedra and Gustavo Yacamán behind the wheel. After finishing no higher than sixth in the opening eight races of the season, the team took delivery of an Oreca 07 chassis to replace the Ligier.

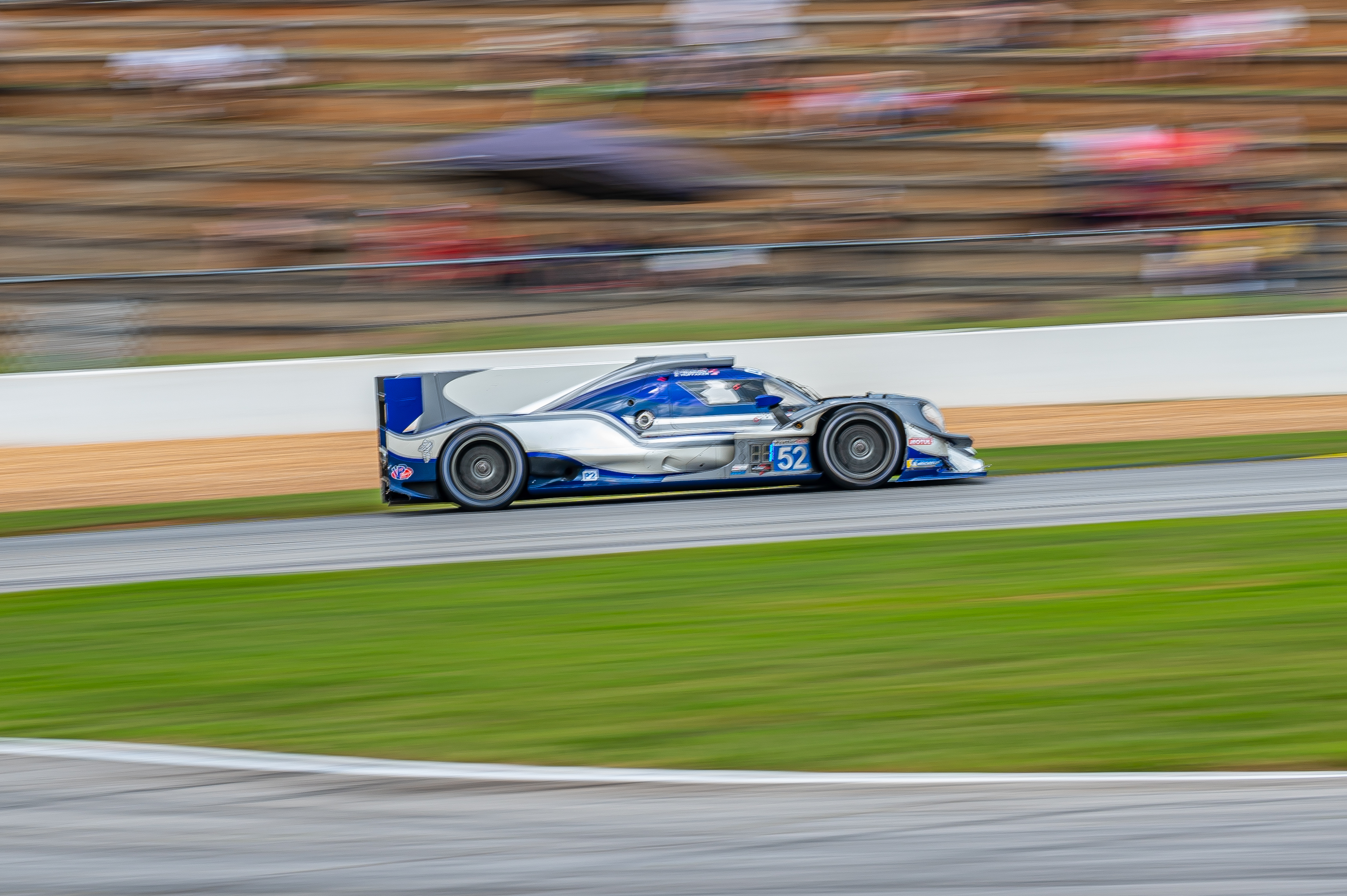
PR1/Mathiasen Motorsports' Oreca 07 at Road Atlanta in 2020

In 2019, PR1/Mathiasen Motorsports followed their chassis into the LMP2 class following the Prototype class split. The team won the 2019 class title in dominating fashion, winning all but the opening two races at Daytona and Sebring. They retained the class title in 2020, adding a class victory at the 12 Hours of Sebring and claiming the Michelin Endurance Cup title in class as well. 2021 saw the team claim their third consecutive LMP2-class title and second consecutive Michelin Endurance Cup crown, this time with Ben Keating and Mikkel Jensen at the wheel. For 2022, the team expanded to running two chassis in the LMP2 class for the full season, retaining their championship-winning 2021 lineup in the No. 52 while adding Steven Thomas and Jonathan Bomarito in the new No. 11 entry.

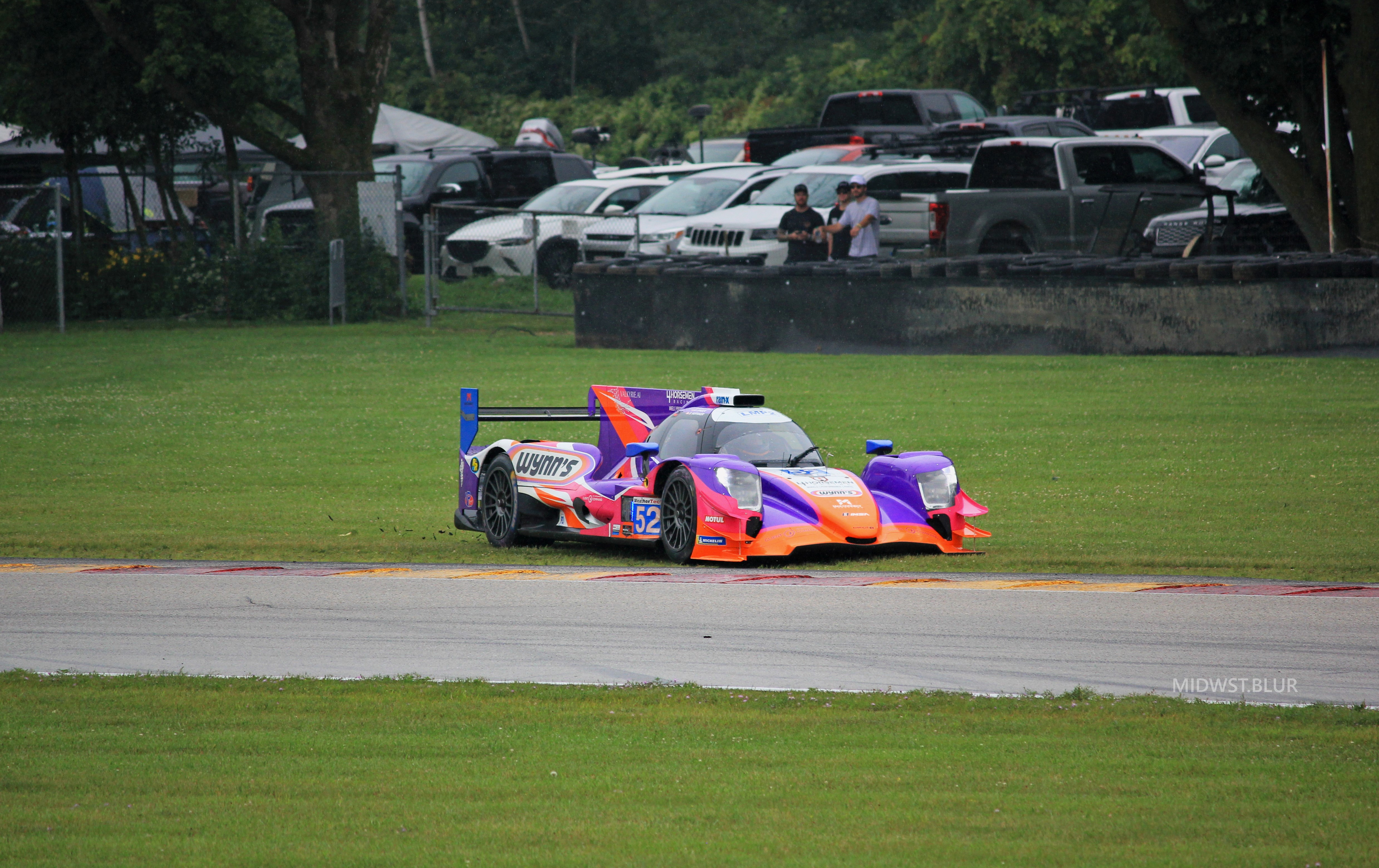
PR1/Mathiasen Motorsports' Oreca 07 at Road America in 2021

=== World Endurance Championship ===
For 2021, Patrick Kelly's Le Mans invitation prompted the team to step into the FIA World Endurance Championship for a partial season. The team established a partnership with Tech 1 Racing to run the car at Spa-Francorchamps and Le Mans.

== Racing results ==
=== Complete IMSA SportsCar Championship results ===
(key) (Races in bold indicate pole position)

Year	Entrant	Class	Make	Engine	No.	Drivers	1	2	3	4	5	6	7	8	9	10	11	Rank	Points
2014	(United States) PR1/Mathiasen Motorsports	PC	Oreca FLM09	Chevrolet 6.2L V8	52	(United States) Gunnar Jeannette (United States) Frankie Montecalvo (United States) Mike Guasch 2 (United States) David Cheng 1	DAY; 4	SEB; 9	LGA; 4	KAN; 4	WGL; 3	IMS; 5	ELK; 7	VIR; 8	COT; 4	ATL; 3		4th	255
2015	(United States) PR1/Mathiasen Motorsports	PC	Oreca FLM09	Chevrolet 6.2L V8	52	(United States) Mike Guasch (United Kingdom) Tom Kimber-Smith (United States) Andrew Palmer 4	DAY; 1	SEB; 1	LGA; 6	DET; 7	WGL; 2	MOS; 5	LIM; 1	ELK; 4	COT; 4	**PET**; 1		2nd	313
2016	(United States) PR1/Mathiasen Motorsports	PC	Oreca FLM09	Chevrolet 6.2 L V8	52	(United States) Robert Alon (United Kingdom) Tom Kimber-Smith (Mexico) José Gutiérrez 4 (United States) Nicholas Boulle 1	DAY; 2	SEB; 2	LBH; 6	**LGA**; 1	**DET**; 3	WGL; 5	MOS; 3	LIM; 2	ELK; 1	**COA**; 2	**ATL**; 1	2nd	355
2017	(United States) PR1/Mathiasen Motorsports	P	Ligier JS P217	Gibson 4.2 L V8	52	(Mexico) José Gutiérrez; 7 (France) Olivier Pla 4 (United Kingdom) Tom Kimber-Smith 3 (United States) Mike Guasch 2 (United States) R.C. Enerson 1 (United States) Will Owen 1 (Italy) Marco Bonanomi 1 (United States) Kenton Koch 1 (United States) Kenton Koch 1 (United Kingdom) Ryan Lewis 1 (United States) Nicholas Boulle 1 (Canada) David Ostella 1 (France) Julien Canal 1	DAY; 9	SEB; 7	LBH; 5	COA; 9	DET; 10	WGL; 4	MOS; 8	ELK; 7	LGA; 7	ATL; 10		7th	237
2018	(United States) PR1/Mathiasen Motorsports	P	Ligier JS P217 1-8; Oreca 07 9-10	Gibson 4.2 L V8	52	(Colombia) Sebastián Saavedra (Colombia) Gustavo Yacamán 9 (Mexico) Roberto González 2 (United States) Will Owen (United States) Nicholas Boulle 1 (Mexico) José Gutiérrez 1	DAY; 12	SEB; 11	LBH; 11	MOH; 6	DET; 8	WGL; 9	MOS; 9	ELK; 13	LGA; 8	PET; 12		12th	211
2019	(United States) PR1/Mathiasen Motorsports	LMP2	Oreca 07	Gibson 4.2 L V8	52	(United States) Matt McMurry (France) Gabriel Aubry 4 (Canada) Dalton Kellett 3 (United States) Eric Lux 2 (France) Enzo Guibbert 1 (United States) Mark Kvamme 1 (Denmark) Anders Fjordbach 1 (United States) Patrick Kelly 1	DAY; 4	**SEB**; 2	MOH; 1	**WGL**; 1	MOS; 1	ELK; 1	**LGA**; 1	ATL; 1				1st	270
2020	(United States) PR1/Mathiasen Motorsports	LMP2	Oreca 07	Gibson 4.2 L V8	52	(Switzerland) Simon Trummer 6 (United States) Patrick Kelly 6 (United States) Scott Huffaker 3 (France) Gabriel Aubry 1 (United States) Nicholas Boulle 1 (United States) Ben Keating 1 (United States) Spencer Pigot 1	**DAY**; 2†	**SEB1**; 1	**ELK**; 4	**ATL1**; 1	**ATL2**; 4	**LGA**; 1	**SEB2**; 1					1st	196
2021	(United States) PR1/Mathiasen Motorsports	LMP2	Oreca 07	Gibson GK428 4.2 L V8	52	(Denmark) Mikkel Jensen (United States) Ben Keating (United States) Scott Huffaker 4 (France) Nicolas Lapierre 1	**DAY**; 7†	SEB; 1	WGL; 2	**WGL**; 1	**ELK**; 3	**LGA**; 1	**PET**; 2					1st	2162
2022	(United States) PR1/Mathiasen Motorsports	LMP2	Oreca 07	Gibson GK428 4.2 L V8	11	(United States) Steven Thomas (United States) Jonathan Bomarito 6 (United States) Josh Pierson 4 (United States) Tristan Nunez 2 (United Kingdom) Harry Tincknell 1	DAY; 7†	SEB; 4	**LGA**; **5**	MOH; 2	WGL; 6	**ELK**; **4**	**ATL**; **3**					4th	1882
2022	(United States) PR1/Mathiasen Motorsports	LMP2	Oreca 07	Gibson GK428 4.2 L V8	52	(United States) Scott Huffaker 4 (Denmark) Mikkel Jensen 4 (United States) Ben Keating 4 (United States) Patrick Kelly 3 (United States) Josh Pierson 3 (France) Nicolas Lapierre 1	**DAY**; **4†**	**SEB**; **1**	LGA; 4	**MOH**; **6**	**WGL**; **1**	ELK; 5	ATL; 6					2nd	1939
2023	(United States) PR1/Mathiasen Motorsports	LMP2	Oreca 07	Gibson GK428 4.2 L V8	52	(France) Paul-Loup Chatin (United States) Ben Keating (United Kingdom) Alex Quinn 4 (France) Nicolas Lapierre 1	**DAY**; **7†**	**SEB**; **4**	LGA; 2	WGL; 3	ELK; 1	**IMS**; **4**	**ATL**; **3**					1st	1995
2024	(Poland) Inter Europol by PR1/Mathiasen Motorsports	LMP2	Oreca 07	Gibson GK428 4.2 L V8	52	(United States) Nick Boulle (France) Tom Dillmann (Poland) Jakub Śmiechowski 5 (Brazil) Pietro Fittipaldi 1	DAY; 4	SEB; 6	WGL; 3	MOS; 1	ELK; 7	**IMS**; **2**	ATL; 4					1st	2227
2025	(United States) PR1/Mathiasen Motorsports	LMP2	Oreca 07	Gibson GK428 4.2 L V8	52	(Denmark) Benjamin Pedersen (Switzerland) Mathias Beche 3 (United States) Rodrigo Sales 3 (United States) Naveen Rao 3 (United States) Logan Sargeant 2 (United States) Ben Keating 1 (United States) Nick Boulle 1	DAY; 3	SEB; 9	WGL; 12	MOS; 5	ELK; 13	IMS; 8	ATL; 4					9th	1826
2026	(United States) Bryan Herta Autosport with PR1/Mathiasen	LMP2	Oreca 07	Gibson GK428 4.2 L V8	52	(Canada) Misha Goikhberg (United States) Ben Keating (Canada) Parker Thompson (United Kingdom) Harry Tincknell	DAY; 6	SEB	WGL	MOS	ELK	IMS	ATL					6th	278

† Points only counted towards the Michelin Endurance Cup, and not the overall LMP2 Championship.

* Season still in progress.

=== 24 Hours of Le Mans results ===
Year	Entrant	No.	Car	Drivers	Class	Laps	Pos.	Class pos.
2021	(United States) PR1 Motorsports Mathiasen (run by Tech 1 Racing)	24	Oreca 07-Gibson	(France) Gabriel Aubry (United States) Patrick Kelly (Switzerland) Simon Trummer	LMP2 (Pro-Am)	261	DNF	DNF
