= 2020 Hyundai Monterey Sports Car Championship =

Tenth round of the 2020 IMSA SportsCar Championship season

Track map of WeatherTech Raceway Laguna Seca

The 2020 Hyundai Monterey Sports Car Championship was a sports car race sanctioned by the International Motor Sports Association (IMSA). The race was held at WeatherTech Raceway Laguna Seca in Monterey County, California, on November 1, 2020. This race was the tenth round of the 2020 WeatherTech SportsCar Championship, and the seventh round of the WeatherTech Sprint Cup.

The overall race was won by Hélio Castroneves and Ricky Taylor, their fourth victory of the season. In LMP2, PR1 Mathiasen Motorsports secured the class victory by default, as no other teams were entered. The GTLM class was won for the second consecutive race by Porsche, albeit this time with the #912 team of Earl Bamber and Laurens Vanthoor. In GTD, Mario Farnbacher and Matt McMurry scored their second victory of the season.

== Background ==
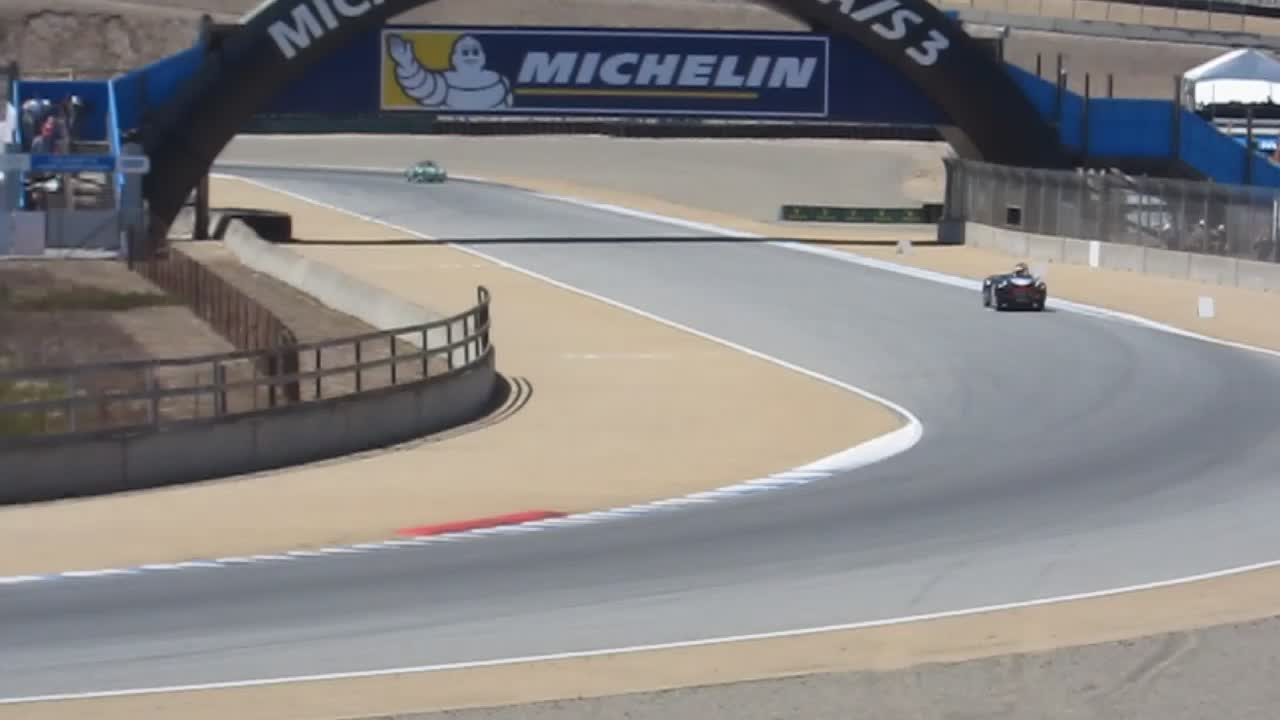
WeatherTech Raceway Laguna Seca, where the race was held.

Then International Motor Sports Association's (IMSA) president Scott Atherton confirmed the race was part of the schedule for the 2020 IMSA SportsCar Championship (IMSA SCC) in August 2019. It was the seventh consecutive year it was held as part of the WeatherTech SportsCar Championship. The 2020 Hyundai Monterey Sports Car Championship was the tenth of eleven sports car races of 2020 by IMSA, and the event was the last of seven races on the WeatherTech Sprint Cup. The race was held at the eleven-turn 2.238 mi (3.602 km) WeatherTech Raceway Laguna Seca.

Initially scheduled to be run on September 13, the event was rescheduled for the weekend of November 1, as a result of the COVID-19 pandemic. The event was run behind closed doors in order to maintain compliance with California state gathering regulations, as it was the only DPi round, and second GT round (Virginia International Raceway the other round in the season) to be held as such, as the second Daytona, Road America, Mid-Ohio, Charlotte, and both Sebring and Road Atlanta rounds were run with spectators. In May, Hyundai was announced as the new title sponsor of the event.

No changes were made to IMSA's balance of performance from the previous round at Road Atlanta.

Before the race, Ryan Briscoe and Renger van der Zande led the DPi Drivers' Championship with 215 points, ahead of Hélio Castroneves and Ricky Taylor in second with 207 points, and Pipo Derani in third. In LMP2, Patrick Kelly led the Drivers' Championship with 126 points. Antonio García and Jordan Taylor led the GTLM Drivers' Championship with 293 points, 28 points ahead of Oliver Gavin and Tommy Milner. With 228 points, Aaron Telitz led the GTD Drivers' Championship, ahead of Jack Hawksworth. Cadillac, Chevrolet, and Lexus were leading their respective Manufactures' Championships while Konica Minolta Cadillac DPi-V.R, PR1/Mathiasen Motorsports, Corvette Racing, and AIM Vasser Sullivan each led their own Teams' Championships.

=== Entries ===
A total of 28 cars took part in the event, split across four classes. 8 were entered in DPi, 1 in LMP2, 6 in GTLM, and 13 in GTD. DPi's only changes were between the two JDC entries. With João Barbosa's exit from the team, Tristan Vautier was drafted in to replace him. As a result, Stephen Simpson returned to the #85 to partner Matheus Leist. LMP2 was reduced to just one entry due to a back injury sustained by Era Motorsport driver Dwight Merriman, leaving championship leaders PR1 Mathiasen Motorsports as the only entrant. In GTD, Alessandro Balzan replaced Toni Vilander as Scuderia Corsa's pro driver. Sprint competitors Team Hardpoint and Compass Racing also returned after skipping Petit Le Mans.

== Practice ==
There were two practice sessions preceding the start of the race on Sunday, both on Saturday. The first session lasted one hour on Saturday morning while the second session lasted 75 minutes on Saturday afternoon.

=== Practice 1 ===
The first practice session took place at 8:00 am PT on Saturday and ended with Pipo Derani topping the charts for Whelen Engineering Racing, with a lap time of 1:15.851, ahead of the #10 Cadillac of Renger van der Zande. Simon Trummer set the fastest time in LMP2. The GTLM class topped by the #3 Corvette Racing Chevrolet Corvette C8.R of Antonio García with a time of 1:21.898. Nick Tandy was second in the #911 Porsche GT Team entry and Earl Bamber rounded out the top 3. Bill Auberlen was fastest in GTD. 44 minutes into the session, Tristan Nunez, driving the #77 Mazda RT24-P, hit a trackside sign at turn 9 whilst trying to avoid hitting the #85 JDC-Miller MotorSports Cadillac of Stephen Simpson. Debris became scattered across the track and brought out the red flag. The Team Hardpoint Audi only completed three laps due to broken drive shaft.

Pos.	Class	No.	Team	Driver	Time	Gap
1	DPi	31	Whelen Engineering Racing	Pipo Derani	1:15.851	_
2	DPi	10	Konica Minolta Cadillac	Renger van der Zande	1:16.370	+0.519
3	DPi	6	Acura Team Penske	Juan Pablo Montoya	1:16.410	+0.579

=== Practice 2 ===
The second final practice session took place at 12:00 pm PT on Saturday and ended with Oliver Jarvis topping the charts for Mazda Motorsports, with a lap time of 1:15.692, 0.185 seconds faster than Dane Cameron's #6 Acura. The PR1/Mathiasen Motorsports did not set a time in LMP2. The GTLM class was topped by the #3 Corvette Racing Chevrolet Corvette C8.R of Jordan Taylor with a time of 1:22.279. Connor De Phillippi in the #25 BMW Team RLL entry was second and Nick Tandy rounded out the top 3. Robby Foley set the fastest time in GTD. The #85 Cadillac of Matheus Leist crashed in turn 2 after suffering a mechanical issue. Felipe Nasr and Hélio Castroneves collided at turn 3 after they exited the pits and Nasr tried letting Castorneves pass. The #7 Acura Team Penske Acura cut across the #31 Whelen Engineering Racing Cadillac and both cars received damage. Castroneves received a stop-and-hold plus 60 second penalty for unsportsmanlike conduct while Nasr was given a drive-through penalty.

Pos.	Class	No.	Team	Driver	Time	Gap
1	DPi	77	Mazda Motorsports	Oliver Jarvis	1:15.692	_
2	DPi	6	Acura Team Penske	Dane Cameron	1:15.877	+0.185
3	DPi	55	Mazda Motorsports	Juan Pablo Montoya	1:16.037	+0.345

== Qualifying ==
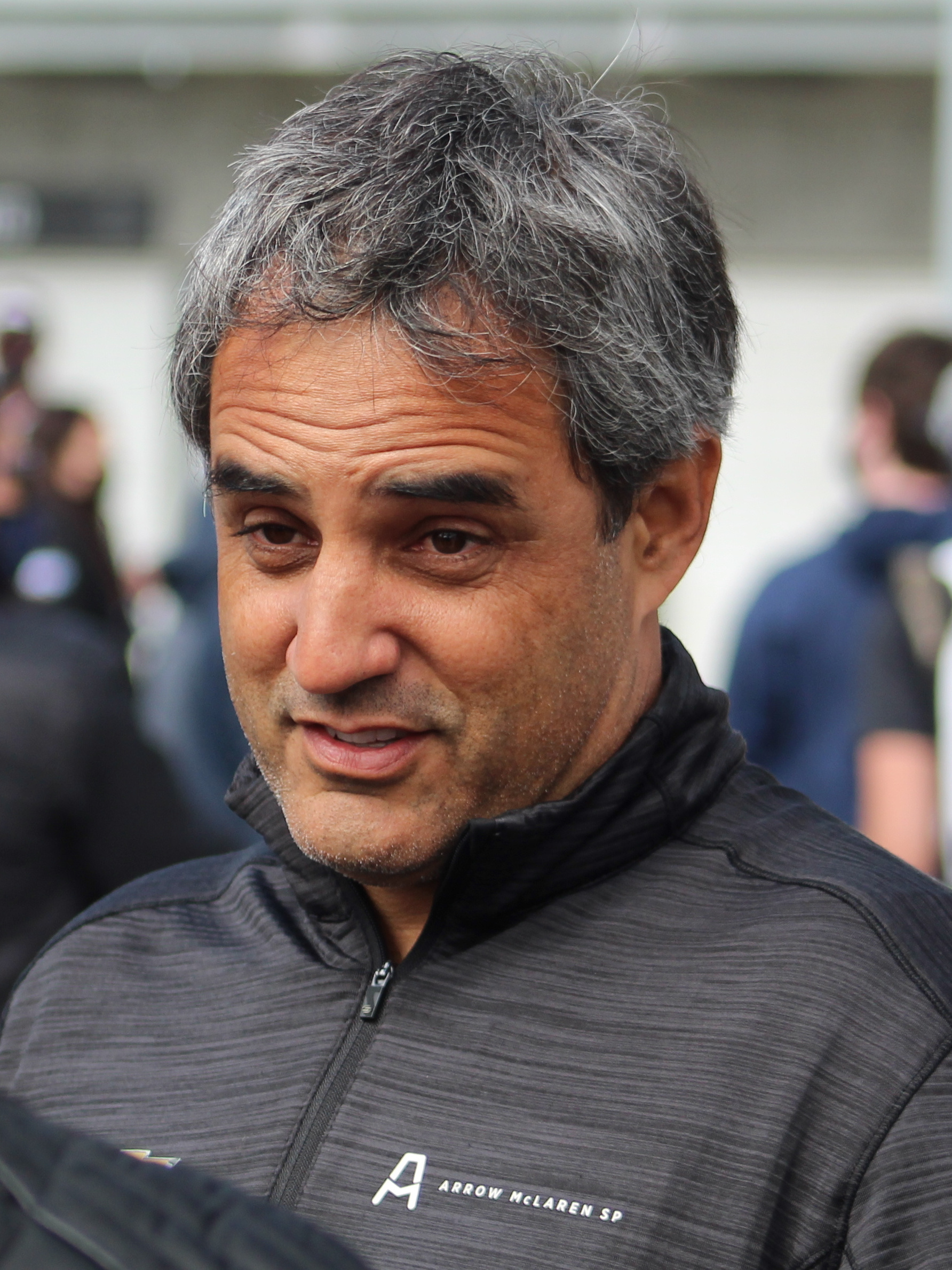
Juan Pablo Montoya (pictured in 2021) helped take the No. 6 Acura's third pole position of 2020.

Sunday's morning qualifying was broken into three sessions, with one session for the DPi and LMP2, GTLM, and GTD classes, which lasted for 15 minutes each, and a ten minute interval between the sessions. The rules dictated that all teams nominated a driver to qualify their cars, with the Pro-Am (LMP2/GTD) classes requiring a Bronze/Silver Rated Driver to qualify the car. The competitors' fastest lap times determined the starting order. IMSA then arranged the grid to put DPis ahead of the LMP2, GTLM, and GTD cars.

The first session was for cars in GTD class. Matt McMurry qualified on pole for the class driving the #86 car for Meyer Shank Racing with Curb-Agajanian, beating Robby Foley in the Turner Motorsport entry by less than two-tenths of a second.

The second session was for cars in the GTLM class. Jordan Taylor qualified on pole driving the #3 car for Corvette Racing, besting Laurens Vanthoor in the #912 Porsche GT Team entry.

The final session of qualifying was for cars in the LMP2 and DPi classes. Juan Pablo Montoya took overall pole for the event driving the #6 car for Acura Team Penske, beating teammate Hélio Castroneves in the sister #7 Acura Team Penske by less than two-tenths of a second. Patrick Kelly secured the LMP2 pole by default.

=== Qualifying results ===
Pole positions in each class are indicated in bold and by ‡.

Pos.	Class	No.	Team	Driver	Time	Gap	Grid
1	**DPi**	**6**	**(United States) Acura Team Penske**	**(Colombia) Juan Pablo Montoya**	**1:15.174**	**_**	1‡
2	DPi	7	(United States) Acura Team Penske	(Brazil) Hélio Castroneves	1:15.333	+0.159	2
3	DPi	77	(Canada) Mazda Motorsports	(United Kingdom) Oliver Jarvis	1:15.411	+0.237	3
4	DPi	31	(United States) Whelen Engineering Racing	(Brazil) Pipo Derani	1:15.420	+0.246	4
5	DPi	5	(United States) JDC-Mustang Sampling Racing	(France) Tristan Vautier	1:15.461	+0.287	5
6	DPi	55	(Canada) Mazda Motorsports	(United States) Jonathan Bomarito	1:15.580	+0.406	6
7	DPi	10	(United States) Konica Minolta Cadillac	(Australia) Ryan Briscoe	1:15.729	+0.555	8^{1}
8	DPi	85	(United States) JDC-Miller MotorSports	(Brazil) Matheus Leist	1:15.852	+0.678	7
9	**LMP2**	**52**	**(United States) PR1/Mathiasen Motorsports**	**(United States) Patrick Kelly**	**1:19.598**	**+4.424**	9‡
10	**GTLM**	**3**	**(United States) Corvette Racing**	**(United States) Jordan Taylor**	**1:21.483**	**+6.309**	10‡
11	GTLM	912	(United States) Porsche GT Team	(Belgium) Laurens Vanthoor	1:21.725	+6.551	11
12	GTLM	4	(United States) Corvette Racing	(United Kingdom) Oliver Gavin	1:21.853	+6.679	12
13	GTLM	25	(United States) BMW Team RLL	(Canada) Bruno Spengler	1:22.054	+6.880	14^{2}
14	GTLM	24	(United States) BMW Team RLL	(Finland) Jesse Krohn	1:22.120	+6.946	15^{3}
15	**GTD**	**86**	**(United States) Meyer Shank Racing with Curb-Agajanian**	**(United States) Matt McMurry**	**1:25.126**	**+9.952**	16‡
16	GTD	96	(United States) Turner Motorsport	(United States) Robby Foley	1:25.140	+9.966	17
17	GTD	63	(United States) Scuderia Corsa	(United States) Cooper MacNeil	1:25.318	+10.144	18
18	GTD	57	(United States) Heinricher Racing with MSR Curb-Agajanian	(Canada) Misha Goikhberg	1:25.426	+10.252	19
19	GTD	12	(Canada) AIM Vasser Sullivan	(United States) Frankie Montecalvo	1:25.475	+10.301	20
20	GTD	23	(United States) Heart of Racing Team	(United Kingdom) Ian James	1:25.676	+10.502	21
21	GTD	76	(United States) Compass Racing	(Canada) Jeff Kingsley	1:25.826	+10.652	22
22	GTD	22	(United States) Gradient Racing	(United Kingdom) Till Bechtolsheimer	1:26.012	+10.838	23
23	GTD	16	(United States) Wright Motorsports	(United States) Ryan Hardwick	1:26.171	+10.997	24
24	GTD	44	(United States) GRT Magnus	(United States) John Potter	1:26.359	+11.185	25
25	GTD	14	(Canada) AIM Vasser Sullivan	(United States) Aaron Telitz	1:26.404	+11.230	26
26	GTD	30	(United States) Team Hardpoint	(United States) Rob Ferriol	1:26.791	+11.617	27
27	GTD	74	(United States) Riley Motorsports	(United States) Gar Robinson	1:29.460	+14.286	28^{4}
28	GTLM	911	(United States) Porsche GT Team	(France) Frederic Makowiecki	1:32.856	+17.682	13
Sources:

- ^{1} The No. 10 Konica Minolta Cadillac entry was moved to the back of the DPi field as per Article 40.1.4 of the Sporting regulations (Change of starting tires).
- ^{2} The No. 25 BMW Team RLL entry was moved to the back of the GTLM field as per Article 40.1.4 of the Sporting regulations (Change of starting tires).
- ^{3} The No. 24 BMW Team RLL entry was moved to the back of the GTLM field as per Article 40.1.4 of the Sporting regulations (Change of starting tires).
- ^{4} The No. 74 Riley Motorsports entry was moved to the back of the GTD field as per Article 40.1.4 of the Sporting regulations (Change of starting tires).

== Race ==
=== Post-race ===
As a result of winning the race Hélio Castroneves and Ricky Taylor took the lead of the DPi Drivers' Championship. Bomarito and Tincknell advanced from fifth to fourth. By starting the race, Patrick Kelly clinched the LMP2 Drivers' Championship. As a result of Gavin and Milner's disqualification, Antonio García and Jordan Taylor clinched the GTLM Drivers' Championship. As a result of winning the race, Mario Farnbacher and Matt McMurry took the lead of the GTD Drivers' Championship. Hardwick and Long advanced from third to second while Telitz dropped from first to third. Cadillac, and Chevrolet continued to top their respective Manufacturers' Championships while Acura took the lead of the GTD Manufactures' Championship. PR1/Mathiasen Motorsports and Corvette Racing their respective advantages in their respective of Teams' Championships while Acura Team Penske took the lead of the DPi Teams' Championship. Meyer Shank Racing with Curb-Agajanian took the lead of the GTD Teams' Championship with one round remaining in the season.

=== Results ===
Class winners are denoted in bold and ‡.

Pos	Class	No.	Team	Drivers	Chassis	Laps	Time/retired
Pos	Class	No.	Team	Drivers	Engine	Laps	Time/retired
1	**DPi**	**7**	**(United States) Acura Team Penske**	**(Brazil) Hélio Castroneves (United States) Ricky Taylor**	**Acura ARX-05**	**119**	**2:40:48.146‡**
1	**DPi**	**7**	**(United States) Acura Team Penske**	**(Brazil) Hélio Castroneves (United States) Ricky Taylor**	**Acura AR35TT 3.5L Turbo V6**	**119**	**2:40:48.146‡**
2	DPi	6	(United States) Acura Team Penske	(United States) Dane Cameron (Colombia) Juan Pablo Montoya	Acura ARX-05	119	+0.487
2	DPi	6	(United States) Acura Team Penske	(United States) Dane Cameron (Colombia) Juan Pablo Montoya	Acura AR35TT 3.5L Turbo V6	119	+0.487
3	DPi	31	(United States) Whelen Engineering Racing	(Brazil) Pipo Derani (Brazil) Felipe Nasr	Cadillac DPi-V.R	119	+1.498
3	DPi	31	(United States) Whelen Engineering Racing	(Brazil) Pipo Derani (Brazil) Felipe Nasr	Cadillac 5.5L V8	119	+1.498
4	DPi	55	(Canada) Mazda Motorsports	(United States) Jonathan Bomarito (United Kingdom) Harry Tincknell	Mazda RT24-P	119	+3.344
4	DPi	55	(Canada) Mazda Motorsports	(United States) Jonathan Bomarito (United Kingdom) Harry Tincknell	Mazda MZ-2.0T 2.0L Turbo I4	119	+3.344
5	DPi	77	(Canada) Mazda Motorsports	(United Kingdom) Oliver Jarvis (United States) Tristan Nunez	Mazda RT24-P	119	+4.095
5	DPi	77	(Canada) Mazda Motorsports	(United Kingdom) Oliver Jarvis (United States) Tristan Nunez	Mazda MZ-2.0T 2.0L Turbo I4	119	+4.095
6	DPi	10	(United States) Konica Minolta Cadillac	(Australia) Ryan Briscoe (Netherlands) Renger van der Zande	Cadillac DPi-V.R	119	+22.411
6	DPi	10	(United States) Konica Minolta Cadillac	(Australia) Ryan Briscoe (Netherlands) Renger van der Zande	Cadillac 5.5L V8	119	+22.411
7	DPi	5	(United States) Mustang Sampling Racing / JDC-Miller Motorsports	(France) Sébastien Bourdais (France) Tristan Vautier	Cadillac DPi-V.R	118	+1 Lap
7	DPi	5	(United States) Mustang Sampling Racing / JDC-Miller Motorsports	(France) Sébastien Bourdais (France) Tristan Vautier	Cadillac 5.5L V8	118	+1 Lap
8	DPi	85	(United States) JDC-Miller MotorSports	(Brazil) Matheus Leist (South Africa) Stephen Simpson	Cadillac DPi-V.R	116	+3 Laps
8	DPi	85	(United States) JDC-Miller MotorSports	(Brazil) Matheus Leist (South Africa) Stephen Simpson	Cadillac 5.5L V8	116	+3 Laps
9	**GTLM**	**912**	**(United States) Porsche GT Team**	**(New Zealand) Earl Bamber (Belgium) Laurens Vanthoor**	**Porsche 911 RSR-19**	**113**	**+6 Laps‡**
9	**GTLM**	**912**	**(United States) Porsche GT Team**	**(New Zealand) Earl Bamber (Belgium) Laurens Vanthoor**	**Porsche 4.2L Flat-6**	**113**	**+6 Laps‡**
10	GTLM	3	(United States) Corvette Racing	(Spain) Antonio García (United States) Jordan Taylor	Chevrolet Corvette C8.R	113	+6 Laps
10	GTLM	3	(United States) Corvette Racing	(Spain) Antonio García (United States) Jordan Taylor	Chevrolet 5.5L V8	113	+6 Laps
11	GTLM	911	(United States) Porsche GT Team	(France) Frédéric Makowiecki (United Kingdom) Nick Tandy	Porsche 911 RSR-19	112	+7 Laps
11	GTLM	911	(United States) Porsche GT Team	(France) Frédéric Makowiecki (United Kingdom) Nick Tandy	Porsche 4.2L Flat-6	112	+7 Laps
12	GTLM	24	(United States) BMW Team RLL	(United States) John Edwards (Finland) Jesse Krohn	BMW M8 GTE	112	+7 Laps
12	GTLM	24	(United States) BMW Team RLL	(United States) John Edwards (Finland) Jesse Krohn	BMW S63 4.0L Turbo V8	112	+7 Laps
13	GTLM	25	(United States) BMW Team RLL	(United States) Connor De Phillippi (Canada) Bruno Spengler	BMW M8 GTE	112	+7 Laps
13	GTLM	25	(United States) BMW Team RLL	(United States) Connor De Phillippi (Canada) Bruno Spengler	BMW S63 4.0L Turbo V8	112	+7 Laps
14 (Note: The no. 4 Corvette Racing entry was moved to the rear of the GTLM classification for violating competition rules regarding the height of the car's rear diffuser.)	GTLM	4	(United States) Corvette Racing	(United Kingdom) Oliver Gavin (United States) Tommy Milner	Chevrolet Corvette C8.R	112	+7 Laps
14	GTLM	4	(United States) Corvette Racing	(United Kingdom) Oliver Gavin (United States) Tommy Milner	Chevrolet 5.5L V8	112	+7 Laps
15	**GTD**	**86**	**(United States) Meyer Shank Racing w/ Curb-Agajanian**	**(Germany) Mario Farnbacher (United States) Matt McMurry**	**Acura NSX GT3 Evo**	**108**	**+11 Laps‡**
15	**GTD**	**86**	**(United States) Meyer Shank Racing w/ Curb-Agajanian**	**(Germany) Mario Farnbacher (United States) Matt McMurry**	**Acura 3.5L Turbo V6**	**108**	**+11 Laps‡**
16	GTD	96	(United States) Turner Motorsport	(United States) Bill Auberlen (United States) Robby Foley	BMW M6 GT3	108	+11 Laps
16	GTD	96	(United States) Turner Motorsport	(United States) Bill Auberlen (United States) Robby Foley	BMW 4.4L Turbo V8	108	+11 Laps
17	GTD	57	(United States) Heinricher Racing w/ MSR Curb-Agajanian	(Canada) Misha Goikhberg (Portugal) Álvaro Parente	Acura NSX GT3 Evo	108	+11 Laps
17	GTD	57	(United States) Heinricher Racing w/ MSR Curb-Agajanian	(Canada) Misha Goikhberg (Portugal) Álvaro Parente	Acura 3.5L Turbo V6	108	+11 Laps
18	GTD	23	(United States) Heart of Racing Team	(Canada) Roman De Angelis (United Kingdom) Ian James	Aston Martin Vantage GT3	108	+11 Laps
18	GTD	23	(United States) Heart of Racing Team	(Canada) Roman De Angelis (United Kingdom) Ian James	Aston Martin 4.0L Turbo V8	108	+11 Laps
19	GTD	44	(United States) GRT Magnus	(United States) Andy Lally (United States) John Potter	Lamborghini Huracán GT3 Evo	108	+11 Laps
19	GTD	44	(United States) GRT Magnus	(United States) Andy Lally (United States) John Potter	Lamborghini 5.2L V10	108	+11 Laps
20	GTD	16	(United States) Wright Motorsports	(United States) Ryan Hardwick (United States) Patrick Long	Porsche 911 GT3 R	108	+11 Laps
20	GTD	16	(United States) Wright Motorsports	(United States) Ryan Hardwick (United States) Patrick Long	Porsche 4.0L Flat-6	108	+11 Laps
21	GTD	63	(United States) Scuderia Corsa	(Italy) Alessandro Balzan (United States) Cooper MacNeil	Ferrari 488 GT3	108	+11 Laps
21	GTD	63	(United States) Scuderia Corsa	(Italy) Alessandro Balzan (United States) Cooper MacNeil	Ferrari F154CB 3.9L Turbo V8	108	+11 Laps
22	GTD	12	(Canada) AIM Vasser Sullivan	(United States) Townsend Bell (United States) Frankie Montecalvo	Lexus RC F GT3	107	+12 Laps
22	GTD	12	(Canada) AIM Vasser Sullivan	(United States) Townsend Bell (United States) Frankie Montecalvo	Lexus 5.0L V8	107	+12 Laps
23	GTD	74	(United States) Riley Motorsports	(United States) Lawson Aschenbach (United States) Gar Robinson	Mercedes-AMG GT3 Evo	107	+12 Laps
23	GTD	74	(United States) Riley Motorsports	(United States) Lawson Aschenbach (United States) Gar Robinson	Mercedes-AMG M159 6.2L V8	107	+12 Laps
24	GTD	30	(United States) Team Hardpoint	(United States) Rob Ferriol (United States) Spencer Pumpelly	Audi R8 LMS Evo	107	+12 Laps
24	GTD	30	(United States) Team Hardpoint	(United States) Rob Ferriol (United States) Spencer Pumpelly	Audi 5.2L V10	107	+12 Laps
25	GTD	14	(Canada) AIM Vasser Sullivan	(United Kingdom) Jack Hawksworth (United States) Aaron Telitz	Lexus RC F GT3	107	+12 Laps
25	GTD	14	(Canada) AIM Vasser Sullivan	(United Kingdom) Jack Hawksworth (United States) Aaron Telitz	Lexus 5.0L V8	107	+12 Laps
26	GTD	22	(United States) Gradient Racing	(United Kingdom) Till Bechtolsheimer (United States) Marc Miller	Acura NSX GT3 Evo	106	+13 Laps
26	GTD	22	(United States) Gradient Racing	(United Kingdom) Till Bechtolsheimer (United States) Marc Miller	Acura 3.5L Turbo V6	106	+13 Laps
27 DNF	GTD	76	(United States) Compass Racing	(United States) Paul Holton (Canada) Jeff Kingsley	McLaren 720S GT3	83	Power Steering
27 DNF	GTD	76	(United States) Compass Racing	(United States) Paul Holton (Canada) Jeff Kingsley	McLaren M840T 4.0L Turbo V8	83	Power Steering
28 DNF	**LMP2**	**52**	**(United States) PR1/Mathiasen Motorsports**	**(United States) Patrick Kelly (Switzerland) Simon Trummer**	**Oreca 07**	**67**	**Did not finish‡**
28 DNF	**LMP2**	**52**	**(United States) PR1/Mathiasen Motorsports**	**(United States) Patrick Kelly (Switzerland) Simon Trummer**	**Gibson 4.2L GK428 V8**	**67**	**Did not finish‡**

== Standings after the race ==
DPi Drivers' Championship standings
Pos.	+/–	Driver	Points
1	1	(Brazil) Helio Castroneves (United States) Ricky Taylor	242
2	1	(Australia) Ryan Briscoe (Netherlands) Renger van der Zande	240
3		(Brazil) Pipo Derani	233
4	1	(United States) Jonathan Bomarito (United Kingdom) Harry Tincknell	225
5	1	(France) Sébastien Bourdais	223

LMP2 Drivers' Championship standings
Pos.	+/–	Driver	Points
1		(United States) Patrick Kelly	161
2	1	(Switzerland) Simon Trummer	126
3	1	(United States) Dwight Merriman (United Kingdom) Kyle Tilley	92
4		(Canada) Cameron Cassels	64
5		(United States) Colin Braun	64

GTLM Drivers' Championship standings
Pos.	+/–	Driver	Points
1		(Spain) Antonio García (United States) Jordan Taylor	325
2		(United Kingdom) Oliver Gavin (United States) Tommy Milner	290
3		(United States) John Edwards (Finland) Jesse Krohn	289
4		(United States) Connor De Phillippi (Canada) Bruno Spengler	285
5		(France) Frédéric Makowiecki (United Kingdom) Nick Tandy	262

GTD Drivers' Championship standings
Pos.	+/–	Driver	Points
1	3	(Germany) Mario Farnbacher (United States) Matt McMurry	256
2	1	(United States) Ryan Hardwick (United States) Patrick Long	249
3	2	(United States) Aaron Telitz	248
4	2	(United Kingdom) Jack Hawksworth	246
5	1	(United States) Robby Foley (United States) Bill Auberlen	236

- Note: Only the top five positions are included for all sets of standings.

DPi Teams' Championship standings
Pos.	+/–	Team	Points
1	1	(United States) #7 Acura Team Penske	242
2	1	(United States) #10 Konica Minolta Cadillac DPi-V.R	240
3		(United States) #31 Whelen Engineering Racing	233
4	1	(Canada) #55 Mazda Motorsports	225
5	1	(United States) #5 Mustang Sampling Racing / JDC-Miller MotorSports	223

LMP2 Teams' Championship standings
Pos.	+/–	Team	Points
1		(United States) #52 PR1/Mathiasen Motorsports	161
2		(United States) #38 Performance Tech Motorsports	96
3		(United States) #18 Era Motorsport	92
4		(United States) #8 Tower Motorsport by Starworks	63
5		(United States) #81 DragonSpeed USA	61

GTLM Teams' Championship standings
Pos.	+/–	Team	Points
1		(United States) #3 Corvette Racing	325
2		(United States) #4 Corvette Racing	290
3		(United States) #24 BMW Team RLL	289
4		(United States) #25 BMW Team RLL	285
5		(United States) #911 Porsche GT Team	262

GTD Teams' Championship standings
Pos.	+/–	Team	Points
1	2	(United States) #86 Meyer Shank Racing with Curb-Agajanian	256
2		(United States) #16 Wright Motorsports	249
3	2	(Canada) #14 AIM Vasser Sullivan	246
4	1	(United States) #96 Turner Motorsport	236
5	1	(Canada) #12 AIM Vasser Sullivan	229

- Note: Only the top five positions are included for all sets of standings.

DPi Manufacturers' Championship standings
Pos.	+/–	Manufacturer	Points
1		(United States) Cadillac	263
2		(Japan) Acura	262
3		(Japan) Mazda	251

GTLM Manufacturers' Championship standings
Pos.	+/–	Manufacturer	Points
1		(United States) Chevrolet	336
2		(Germany) BMW	318
3		(Germany) Porsche	286
4		(Italy) Ferrari	28

GTD Manufacturers' Championship standings
Pos.	+/–	Manufacturer	Points
1	1	(Japan) Acura	269
2	1	(Japan) Lexus	267
3		(Germany) Porsche	256
4		(Germany) BMW	251
5		(Italy) Lamborghini	245

- Note: Only the top five positions are included for all sets of standings.

IMSA SportsCar Championship
Previous race: 2020 Petit Le Mans	2020 season	Next race: 2020 12 Hours of Sebring
