= Garage 56 =

Concept car program at 24 Hours of Le Mans

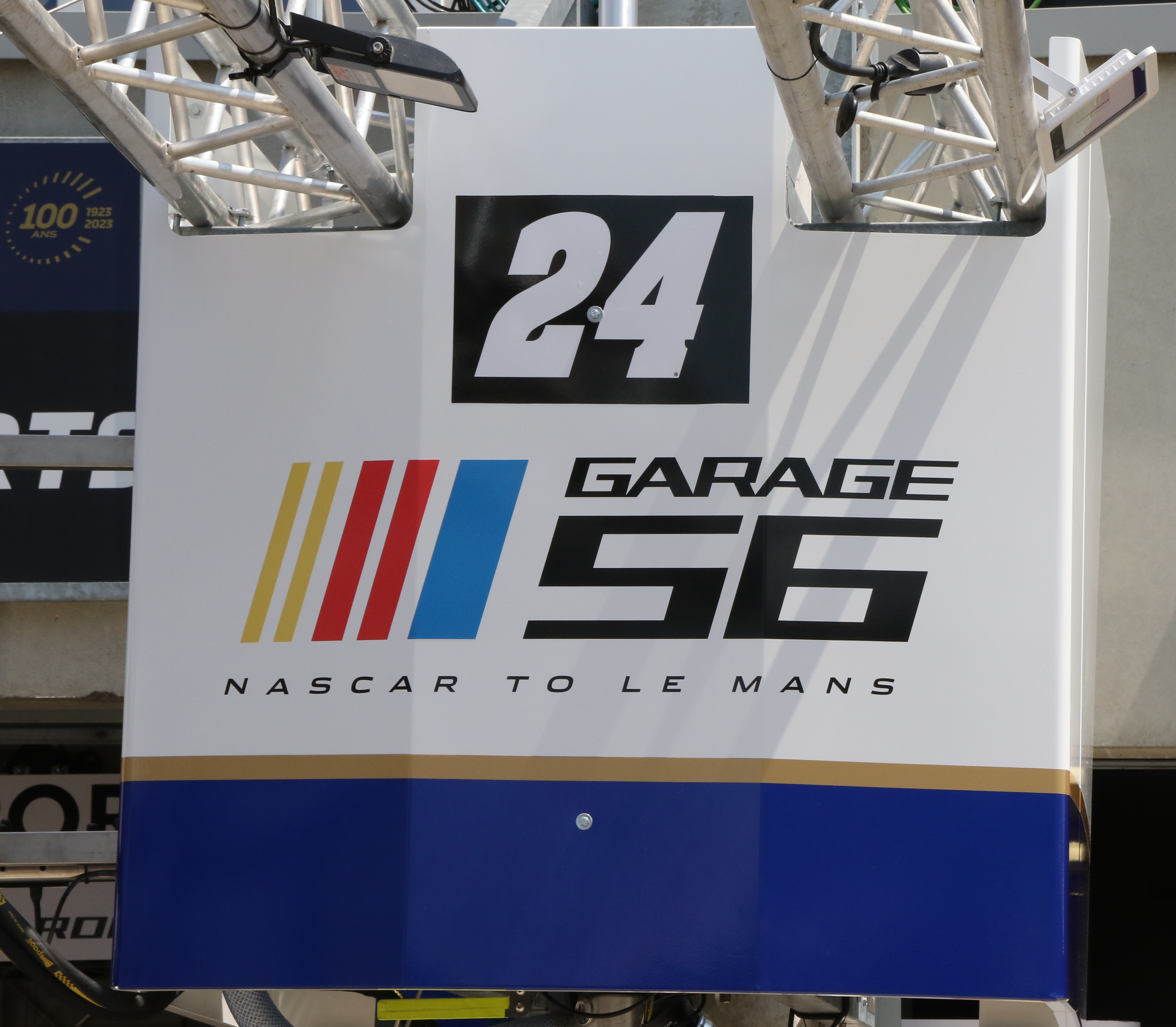
Pit lane sign for the 2023 Garage 56 entry

Garage 56 is a program at the 24 Hours of Le Mans for concept cars to test new automotive technologies. They are classified in the race results and drive alongside those competing, but are not expected to be competitive since their sole focus is to demonstrate experimental features.

The name refers to the 56th and newest garage at Circuit de la Sarthe when the program was introduced in 2010, intended for teams "presenting a specific and innovative project". The first entry came two years later.

== History ==
The program debuted in 2012 with the DeltaWing, an unusual rocket-shaped car fielded by All-American Racers and supported by Nissan. The DeltaWing concept showed promise, delivering nearly LMP2-level performance while consuming only 48% as much fuel, but retired after a collision with an LMP1 car six hours into the race.

In 2013, Garage 56 was given to the Swiss-designed hydrogen-fueled GreenGT H2, which was to be the first car without an internal combustion engine to compete at Le Mans. However, the car was pronounced unfit to take part in the race by the team a few days before the race. In 2016, the H2 went on to complete a single demonstration lap at Le Mans.

The Nissan ZEOD RC, a hybrid electric car based on the DeltaWing's design, took the Garage 56 slot in 2014. Despite an early retirement from the race after only 23 minutes due to a gearbox issue, the ZEOD RC achieved its goals of hitting a top speed of 300 km/h (186.41 mph), and completing the first ever lap of Le Mans using exclusively electric power at racing speed.

In 2015, the Garage 56 program took a break as all applications that year were deemed unfit by the Automobile Club de l'Ouest.

Frederic Sausset, a quadruple amputee, drove a modified Morgan LMP2 in the 2016 race.

Financial problems forced Welter Racing to cancel its 2017 Garage 56 run with the Green4U Panoz Racing GT-EV, a biomethane-fuel prototype featuring a 3-cylinder 1.2-liter engine fueled by biomethane stored in cryogenic tanks. Welter Racing went on to develop the car with hopes of entering the car in 2018 and 2019, but ultimately did not compete due to complex issues with the car in 2018, and due to Don Panoz's death causing the suspension of the program in 2019. The 2019 slot was also eyed by UK-based constructor Perrinn with the Project 424, an LMP1-based electric-powered car with an autonomous driving mode. However, this did not come to pass, and Garage 56 was left empty in both 2018 and 2019 as the ACO deemed none of the applications to be sufficiently mature.

2020 saw Frederic Sausset attempting to return to Garage 56 under the SRT41 banner by fielding a specially modified Oreca 07 LMP2 car with a lineup of three disabled drivers; however, the attempt was cancelled due to the COVID-19 pandemic. The SRT41 program was delayed to 2021, which saw Garage 56 successfully making a return for the first time in five years. Two of the drivers, paralyzed from the waist down, became the first disabled teammates to compete in the history of the race.

In 2022, Garage 56 was once again empty.

For 2023, a modified NASCAR Cup Series Next Gen Chevrolet Camaro ZL1 stock car fielded by Hendrick Motorsports was the Garage 56 entry, with seven-times Cup champion Jimmie Johnson, 2009 Formula One world champion and NASCAR driver Jenson Button, and 2010 Le Mans overall and LMP1 winner Mike Rockenfeller driving the car. The car marked NASCAR's 75th anniversary, which coincided with the race's centenary. Chad Knaus, Johnson's crew chief during each of his Cup Series championships, was project manager, while the car bore No. 24 in honour of Hendrick vice chairman and former driver Jeff Gordon.

== Entries ==
Year	Car	Team	Image	Placement
2012	DeltaWing	Highcroft Racing		DNF
2013	GreenGT LMP-H2	GreenGT		Withdrew
2014	Nissan ZEOD RC	Nissan Motorsports Global		DNF
2016	SRT41	OAK Racing		38th
2017	Green4U Panoz Racing GT-EV	Welter Racing		Not Entered
2020	Association SRT41	Graff Racing		Withdrew
2021	Association SRT41	Graff Racing		32nd
2023	Chevrolet Camaro ZL1	Hendrick Motorsports		39th

== See also ==
- Mission 1000, a program at the Dakar Rally for vehicles on alternative power sources
