= David Ostella =

Canadian racing driver (born 1991)

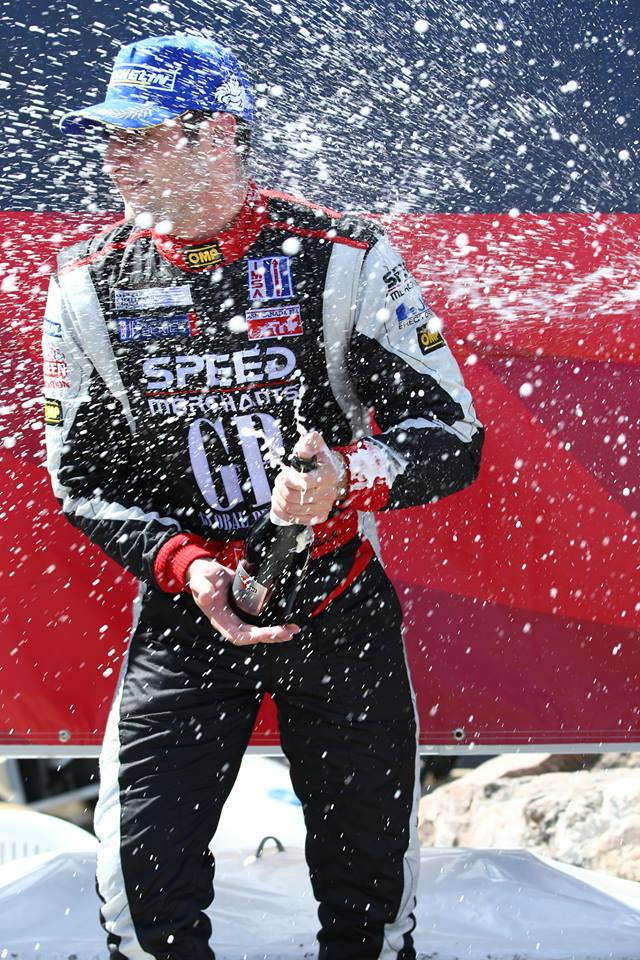
- Nationality: (Canada) Canadian
- Born: October 8, 1991 (age 35) Maple, Ontario, Canada

Ultra 94 Porsche GT3 Cup Challenge Canada by Michelin career
- Debut season: 2011
- Current team: SpeedMerchants Motorsports
- Categorisation: FIA Silver
- Car number: 13
- Wins: 2
- Poles: 2
- Fastest laps: 1
- Best finish: 1st in 2013

Previous series
- 2011-2012 2009–2012 2008: Indy Lights; Star Mazda Championship; Formula BMW Americas

Championship titles
- 2006 2013: Ron Fellows Karting Championship; Ultra 94 Porsche GT3 Cup Canada

David Ostella (born October 8, 1991) is a Canadian racing driver from Maple, Ontario.

After racing in various American and Canadian karting series, Ostella made his professional racing debut in Formula BMW Americas in 2008 for Eurointernational, finishing 9th in points. In 2009 he moved to the Star Mazda Series with AIM Autosport and finished thirteenth in points with one podium finish. In 2010, he returned to the series with AIM and improved to twelfth in points. For 2011, he signed with Jensen MotorSport to race in the Firestone Indy Lights series. Ostella finished the championship ninth overall, accruing 287 points after contesting thirteen of the fourteen rounds. Ostella finished a career best fourth for Jensen in the season opener on the streets of St. Petersberg. He signed with Team Moore Racing to return to Indy Lights in 2012. Ostella improved to eighth in points and captured his first series podium, a runner-up finish in the season finale at Auto Club Speedway where he also recorded the fastest lap of the race.

In 2013, Ostella was hired by PR1/Mathasian Motorsports to drive in the 2013 12 Hours of Sebring in an LMPC car. Ostella helped the team win the race in the PC class and finish ninth overall.

Ostella finished the 2013 season in the Ultra 94 IMSA GT3 Cup Challenge Canada with SpeedMerchants Motorsports. Taking home two wins and nine podium finishes, Ostella was able to clinch the top spot in the points standings in the Platinum Cup championship. As the points champion, Ostella was given his own Porsche 911 to race around the streets of his native Toronto for one year.

== Motorsports career results ==
=== American open–wheel racing ===
(key) (Races in bold indicate pole position; races in italics indicate fastest lap)

==== Star Mazda Championship ====
Year	Team	1	2	3	4	5	6	7	8	9	10	11	12	13	Rank	Points
2009		SEB ?	VIR ?	MMP ?	NJ1 ?	NJ2 ?	WIS ?	IOW ?	ILL ?	ILL ?	QUE ?	ONT ?	ATL ?	LAG ?	**13th**	**294**
2010	AIM Autosport	SEB; 13	STP; 7	LAG; 18	ORP; 8	IOW; 14	NJ1; 22	NJ2; 7	ACC; 4	ACC; 23	TRO; 5	ROA; 7	MOS; 10	ATL	**12th**	**306**

==== Indy Lights Results ====
Year	Team	1	2	3	4	5	6	7	8	9	10	11	12	13	14	Rank	Points	Ref
2011	Jensen MotorSport	STP; 4	ALA; 13	LBH; 9	INDY; 8	MIL; 7	IOW; 9	TOR; 13	EDM1; 14	EDM2; 8	TRO; 7	NHM; 6	BAL; 15	KTY; 12	LVS	**9th**	**287**	
2012	Team Moore Racing	STP; 15	ALA; 9	LBH; 8	INDY; 18	DET; 13	MIL; 4	IOW; 5	TOR; 7	EDM; 10	TRO; 6	BAL; 4	FON; 2			**8th**	**298**	

=== Complete WeatherTech SportsCar Championship results ===
(key) (Races in bold indicate pole position) (Races in italics indicate fastest lap)

Year	Team	Class	Make	Engine	1	2	3	4	5	6	7	8	9	10	Pos.	Points	Ref
2014	Performance Tech	PC	Oreca FLM09	Chevrolet LS3 6.2 L V8	DAY; 3	SEB; 10†	LGA; 8	KAN; 9	WGL; 4	IND; 4	ELK; 6	VIR; 2	COA; 10†	ATL; 10	11th	198	
2017	PR1/Mathiasen Motorsports	P	Ligier JS P217	Gibson GK428 4.2 L V8	DAY	SEB	LBH	AUS	BEL	WGL	MOS; 8	ELK	LGA	PET	34th	23	

^{†} Ostella did not complete sufficient laps in order to score full points.
