= DeltaWing =

American racing car

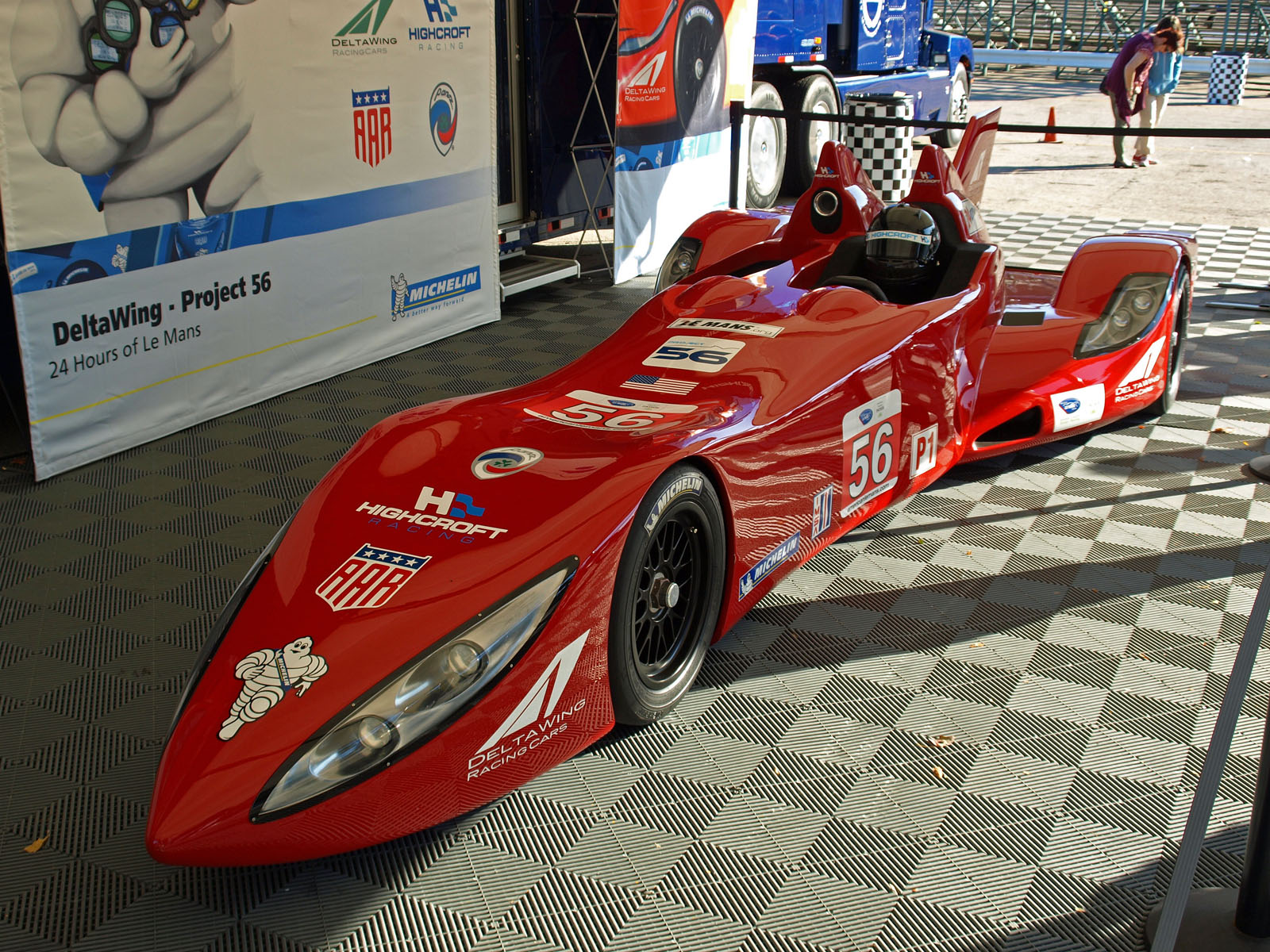
- Constructor: All American Racers
- Designer: Ben Bowlby

Technical specifications
- Chassis: Aston Martin AMR-One tub with Recyclable Energy Absorbing Matrix System bodywork panels
- Length: 183.07 in (465.0 cm)
- Width: 78.74 in (200.0 cm)
- Height: 40.55 in (103.0 cm)
- Axle track: 23.6 in (600 mm) (front); 66.93 in (1,700 mm) (rear)
- Wheelbase: 120.8 in (3,070 mm)
- Engine: 1.9 L (120 cu in) I4 turbocharged Rear Mid-Engine (2013–)
- Transmission: 5-speed (2012–2015); 6-speed (2016–) sequential manual , torque-vectoring differential
- Weight: 1,047 lb (475 kg) (no fuel or driver, 2012 24 Hours of Le Mans) 1,360 lb (620 kg) (no fuel or driver, 2016 team estimate)
- Fuel: Le Mans Shell E10 petro 98RON
- Tires: Michelin; Bridgestone; Continental

Competition history
- Notable entrants: (United States) Highcroft Racing
- Notable drivers: (United Kingdom) Marino Franchitti (Germany) Michael Krumm (Japan) Satoshi Motoyama (Spain) Lucas Ordóñez (United States) Gunnar Jeannette (United Kingdom) Katherine Legge
- Debut: 2012 24 Hours of Le Mans
Races	Wins	Poles	F/Laps
29	0	0	0

The DeltaWing is a racing car designed by British race car designer and engineer Ben Bowlby and debuted at the 2012 24 Hours of Le Mans. The entry was run under the Project 56 name, composed of Ben Bowlby (design), Dan Gurney's All American Racers (constructor), Duncan Dayton's Highcroft Racing (racing team) and International Motor Sports Association owner Don Panoz (managing partner). Nissan's NISMO division provided the engine in return for naming rights for part of 2012.

The DeltaWing was built and maintained at Panoz headquarters in Braselton, Georgia, US.

== History ==
The project began in January 2009, when British designer Ben Bowlby created a potential new IndyCar Series design for the 2012 season.

With financial backing from Chip Ganassi, owner of Chip Ganassi Racing, the prototype was unveiled in February 2010 at the Chicago Auto Show. Ganassi and the team partners own the car and its patents. In July 2010, IndyCar chose a Dallara design instead.

Bowlby then worked with Don Panoz to present the idea to representatives from the Automobile Club de l'Ouest, organizers of the 24 Hours of Le Mans. They applied for and received an invitation to race in the 2012 Le Mans race as a "Garage 56" entrant, a category reserved for experimental vehicles.

Despite skepticism over the project, the DeltaWing made its on-track debut on March 1, 2012, completing a shakedown at Buttonwillow Raceway Park.

The DeltaWing was planned to compete at the 2012 Petit Le Mans. Panoz stated that he hoped that the car would be allowed under the LMP1 and LMP2 regulations of the American Le Mans Series in 2013, or that it would replace the Oreca FLM09 as the LMP Challenge spec car.

On February 5, 2013, Marshall Pruett of Speed Channel revealed that Don Panoz would enter the DeltaWing in the road course events on the American Le Mans Series for the 2013 season. Panoz will develop the car without the DeltaWing's original partners Nissan, All American Racers and Michelin. Instead of the car being set to P2 regulations, Panoz made the 2013 model to P1 specifications as well as enable the car to compete for points as a fully classified P1 entry. The Sebring version continued to be an open top prototype, but later versions were closed top. The power plant was a 2.0L Mazda MZR-based engine produced by Élan Motorsport Technologies which is currently producing 345 hp on the dyno and is lighter than the RML-built Nissan engine of 2012.

=== ZEOD RC lawsuit ===
A lawsuit was filed on November 22, 2013, by the DeltaWing consortium (Don Panoz, Chip Ganassi) against the former designer of the DeltaWing, Ben Bowlby, and former engine-supplier Nissan for “damages and injunctive relief arising out of theft of confidential and proprietary information, misappropriation of trade secrets, breach of contracts, unjust enrichment, fraud, and negligent misrepresentation. The lawsuit, arising from the similarly designed and technologically derived Nissan ZEOD RC and BladeGlider concept car, was settled out of court for confidential terms in March 2016.

== Design ==
The DeltaWing was designed to reduce aerodynamic drag dramatically, to allow a marginally faster straight and corner speed than a 2009–2011 Dallara IndyCar on both ovals and road/street courses with half as much weight, engine power and fuel consumption. As the name suggests, it has a delta wing shape, with an unusually narrow 2.0 feet (61 cm) front track and a more traditional 1.7 metres (5 ft 7 in) rear track. The car lacks any front or rear wings – downforce comes from the underbody. In 2012, the engine was a four-cylinder turbocharged direct injection 300 bhp unit assembled by Ray Mallock Engineering with largely Chevrolet parts. The model to run at Le Mans had a 40 litres (8.8 imp gal; 11 US gal) fuel tank, bespoke BBS 38 centimetres (15 in) wheels and Michelin tyres, a weight of 475 kilograms (1,047 lb), a power-to-weight ratio of 631 horsepower (464 kW) per ton, and a drag coefficient of 0.35.

The braking system weighs 13.2 kilograms (29.2 lb), about half the normal weight for a race car. Also unique compared to other race cars is that 72.5 percent of the mass and 76 percent of the downforce is at the rear. It has a moveable Gurney flap, which is normally not allowed but is permitted for experimental vehicles.

=== Coupe model ===
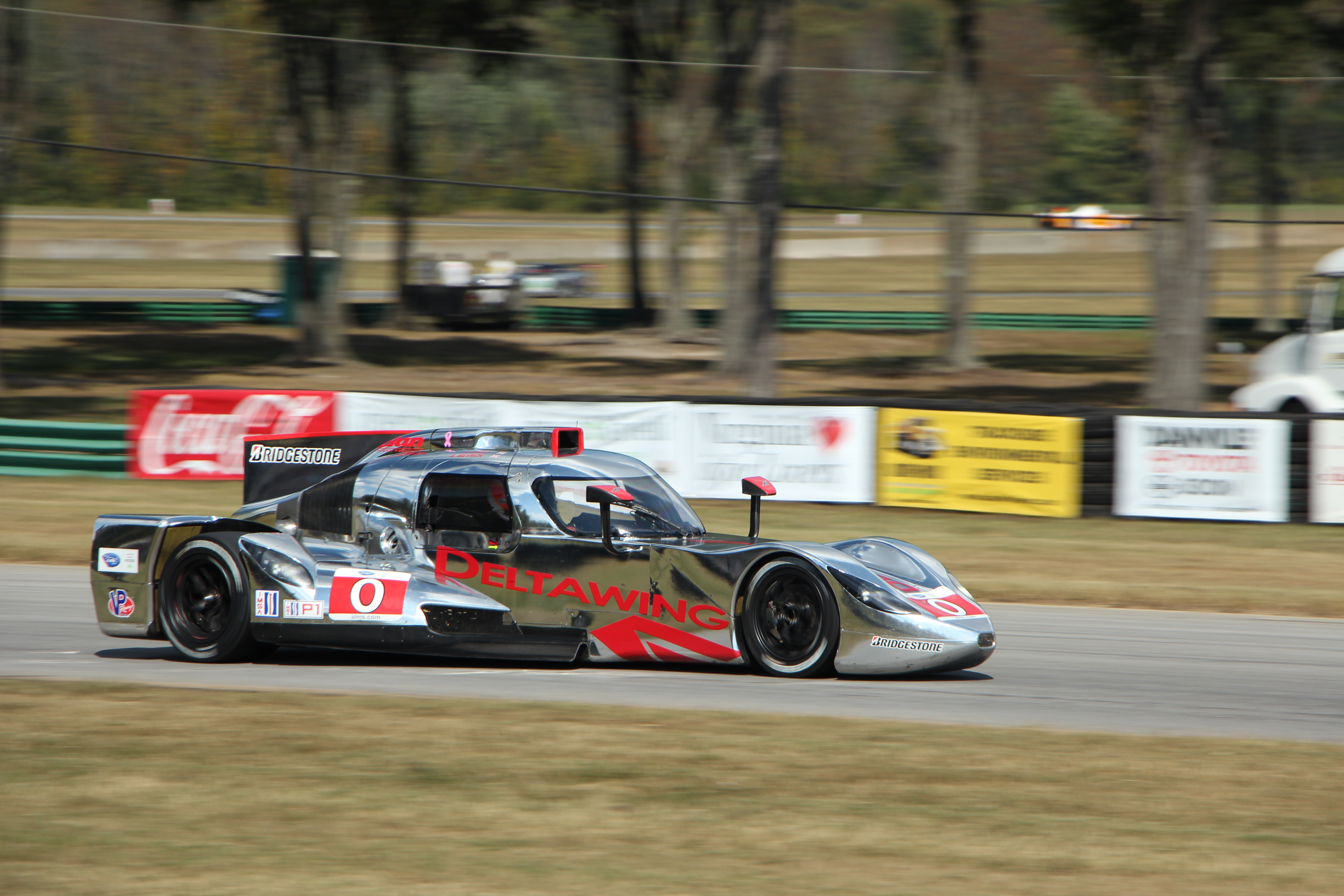
The Deltawing coupe 2013

In 2013, a coupe variant of the DeltaWing was unveiled at the 12 Hours of Sebring race and made its race debut at the 2013 American Le Mans Series round at Austin in September.

The redesign was intended to bring the DeltaWing in line with Le Mans Prototype P1 regulations, and to minimize the chance of the driver's head being hit in the event of an accident. There are also several other changes to the design: including the adoption of a purpose-built monocoque (rather than the Aston Martin derived one used on the previous car), and addition of a roof mounted air intake. The car was first tested in September 2013. The new closed top chassis was given the designation DWC13 as opposed to the open top DWC12 used previously, although some unofficial sources still refer to the coupe as DWC12.

== Competition history ==
=== 2012 24 Hours of Le Mans ===
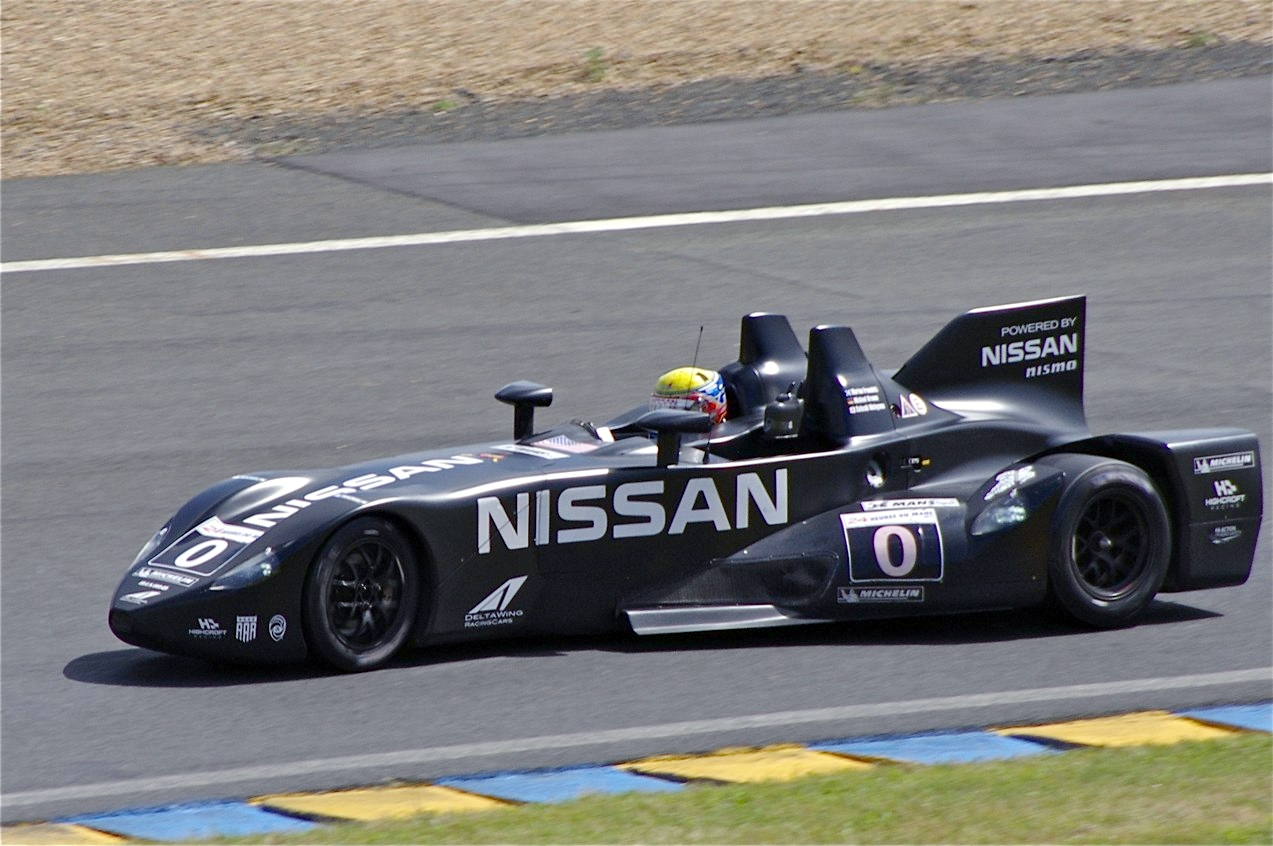
The Nissan Deltawing racing at Le Mans in 2012

In June 2011 it was announced that the car would fill the 56th garage at the 2012 24 Hours of Le Mans, reserved for experimental vehicles. As with all Le Mans cars, the DeltaWing was a two-seater. Marino Franchitti, Michael Krumm and Satoshi Motoyama drove the DeltaWing at Le Mans. It qualified 29th with a time of 3:42.612, which was 18.825 behind the lead car.

The car was retired after 75 laps following an accident in which the DeltaWing ran into a concrete barrier at the Porsche Curves after a collision with Kazuki Nakajima's Toyota TS030 Hybrid. The DeltaWing recorded a best race lap time of 3:45.737, rivaling some of the LMP2 teams. The car did 11 laps on one tank, that is 150 km on a 40-litre fuel tank (26.67 L/100 km or 8.82 mi/gal).

=== 2012 Petit Le Mans ===
After failing to complete the 24 hours of Le Mans, DeltaWing was granted an unclassified entry to the 2012 Petit Le Mans at Road Atlanta. After rebuilding the car from a collision in practice the DeltaWing went on to finish fifth overall, completing 388 laps to the overall winner's 394. The car also underwent testing for its potential inclusion as a classified entry in the American Le Mans Series starting in 2013.

=== 2013 season ===
The DeltaWing was entered in the 2013 American Le Mans Series in the P1 class, now using an Élan chassis and a 1.9 liter four-cylinder turbocharged gasoline engine producing 350 bhp, built by Élan and based on a Mazda design. The team was headed by David Price, former owner of David Price Racing.

The new car debuted at 12 Hours of Sebring, where it was driven by Olivier Pla and Andy Meyrick. Pla qualified the car in fifteenth place, ten seconds off the pace the Audi R18 that qualified on pole, and five seconds slower than its nearest rival in the P1 class, but 5 seconds ahead of the fastest GT class car. After struggling with temperatures all week, the car retired in the second hour with a terminal engine failure after only ten laps.

The DeltaWing competed most of the season with drivers Meyrick and Katherine Legge. It only scored two times, with a best place of 5th overall at Road America (last in P1 and beaten by 2 PC-class cars). The car was notably absent from Long Beach and Baltimore, the reason given by the Deltawing Team Manager, Dave Price was "At the moment, we're not planning to do Long Beach or Baltimore, principally because we're not convinced it would be ideally suited for those [street] circuits".

The coupe version of the car debuted at The Circuit of the America's race. It qualified last in P1; 8 seconds slower than the leading P1 car and was also slower than all the P2 cars. In the race it completed 66 laps to the winner's 83 and finished 29th overall and last in the P1 class.

=== 2014 season ===
The DeltaWing began competing in the new United SportsCar Championship in 2014. The four drivers at the 24 Hours of Daytona were Meyrick, Legge, eventual Indy Lights champion Gabby Chaves and Alexander Rossi. Whilst the P1 class no longer competes in the USCC the DeltaWing race team continued to run in their P1 specification of 490 kg and 350 bhp. The DeltaWing led 15 laps of the 10-hour finale at Road Atlanta, the Petit Le Mans, en route to a season-high fourth-place finish.

=== 2015 season ===
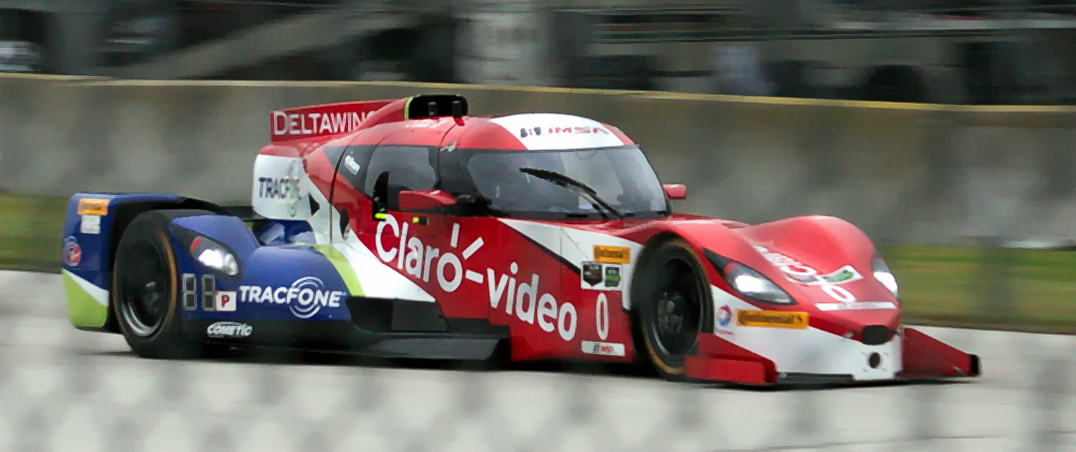
The Deltawing DWC13 racing in 2015.

For the 2015 United SportsCar Championship, Legge had a new partner in Memo Rojas, whereas Meyrick joined at Daytona and Sebring, and Gabby Chaves at Daytona. The team spent significant time at the front of the field during the first 90 minutes, only to retire due to recurring problems with the car's redesigned gearbox. The team finished only three out of nine appearances, with a best results of sixth at Road America. They finished eighth in the Prototypes teams standings.

=== 2016 season ===
In 2016, Legge would have two part-time co-drivers in Andy Meyrick and Sean Rayhall sharing a seat and driving together in North American Endurance Cup, with Andreas Wirth joining them at Daytona. The team elected not to qualify at Daytona because of poor conditions, but quickly moving through the field, leading a total of 29 laps between Legge and Meyrick before the latter crashed into a stationary vehicle in the semi-blind Turn 1. The bad luck followed the team to Sebring, where the steering broke while running in eighth position, leaving the car to retire from the event. After starting sixth at Long Beach (which had skipped the event every year since 2013 due to fears of suspension trouble on the bumps of the street course), the team encountered braking issues that would plague them until an engine failure forced the car to be retired.

=== 2017 season ===
After the 2016 season it wouldn't be possible anymore to race with the DeltaWing, due to changed regulations. Don Panoz told the press that they had some unfinished business with the Rolex 24. It would be in the same class as the new DPi's and LMP2's according to the organization. In November 2016 it was confirmed that the DeltaWing wouldn't race in the 2017 Rolex 24.

== Results summary ==
=== Complete 24 Hours of Le Mans results ===
Year	Entrant	Class	No.	Drivers	Pos.
2012	(United States) Highcroft Racing	CDNT	0	(United Kingdom) Marino Franchitti (Germany) Michael Krumm (Japan) Satoshi Motoyama	Ret

=== Complete American Le Mans Series results ===
(key) Races in bold indicates pole position. Races in italics indicates fastest lap.

Year	Entrant	Class	Drivers	No.	Rds.	Rounds										Pts.	Pos.
Year	Entrant	Class	Drivers	No.	Rds.	1	2	3	4	5	6	7	8	9	10	Pts.	Pos.
2012	(United States) DeltaWing Nissan	N/A	(United States) Gunnar Jeannette (Spain) Lucas Ordoñez	0	10; 10	SEB	LBH	LAG	LRP	MOS	MOH	RAM	BGP	VIR	PET; 5	N/A	N/A
2013	(United States) DeltaWing Racing Cars	P1	(United Kingdom) Andy Meyrick (France) Olivier Pla (United Kingdom) Katherine Legge	0	1, 3-6, 8-10; 1; 3-6, 8-10	SEB; DNF	LBH	LAG; DNF	LRP; DNF	MOS; DNF	ELK; 3	BAL	COA; 3†	VIR; DNF	PET; DNF	26	4th

^{†} Did not finish the race but was classified as they completed more than 70% of the race distance.

=== Complete IMSA SportsCar Championship results ===
(key) Races in bold indicates pole position. Races in italics indicates fastest lap. (key) Races in bold indicates pole position. Races in italics indicates fastest lap.

Year	Entrant	Class	Drivers	No.	Rds.	Rounds											Pts.	Pos.
Year	Entrant	Class	Drivers	No.	Rds.	1	2	3	4	5	6	7	8	9	10	11	Pts.	Pos.
2014	(United States) DeltaWing Racing Cars	P	(United Kingdom) Katherine Legge (United Kingdom) Andy Meyrick (Colombia) Gabby Chaves (United States) Alexander Rossi	0	1-2, 4, 6-7, 9, 11; 1-2, 4, 7, 9, 11; 1-2, 6, 11; 1	DAY; 16	SEB; 15	LBH	LGA; 9	DET	WGL; 12	MOS; DNS	IMS	ELK; 6	COA	PET; 4	131	12th
2015	(United States) DeltaWing Racing Cars with Claro/TracFone	P	(United Kingdom) Katherine Legge (Mexico) Memo Rojas (United Kingdom) Andy Meyrick (Colombia) Gabby Chaves	0	1-4, 6-10; 1-4, 6-10; 1-2, 10; 1	DAY; 15	SEB; 12	LBH; 9	LGA; 8	DET	WGL; 8	MOS; 8	ELK; 6	COA; 7	PET; 8		207	8th
2016	(United States) Panoz DeltaWing Racing	P	(United Kingdom) Katherine Legge (United Kingdom) Andy Meyrick (United States) Sean Rayhall (Germany) Andreas Wirth	0	1-4, 6-10; 1-3, 10; 1-2, 4, 6-10; 1; 6	DAY; 12	SEB; 9	LBH; 8	LGA; 5	DET	WGL; 7	MOS; 7	ELK; 7	COA; 5	PET; 8		220	8th

== See also ==
- Nissan ZEOD RC
- General Motors Firebird

== Notes ==
Awards
Preceded by Senna	Autosport; Pioneering and Innovation Award; 2012; With: FIA medical team	Succeeded by Nissan GT Academy
