= Nissan ZEOD RC =

Hybrid electric racing car

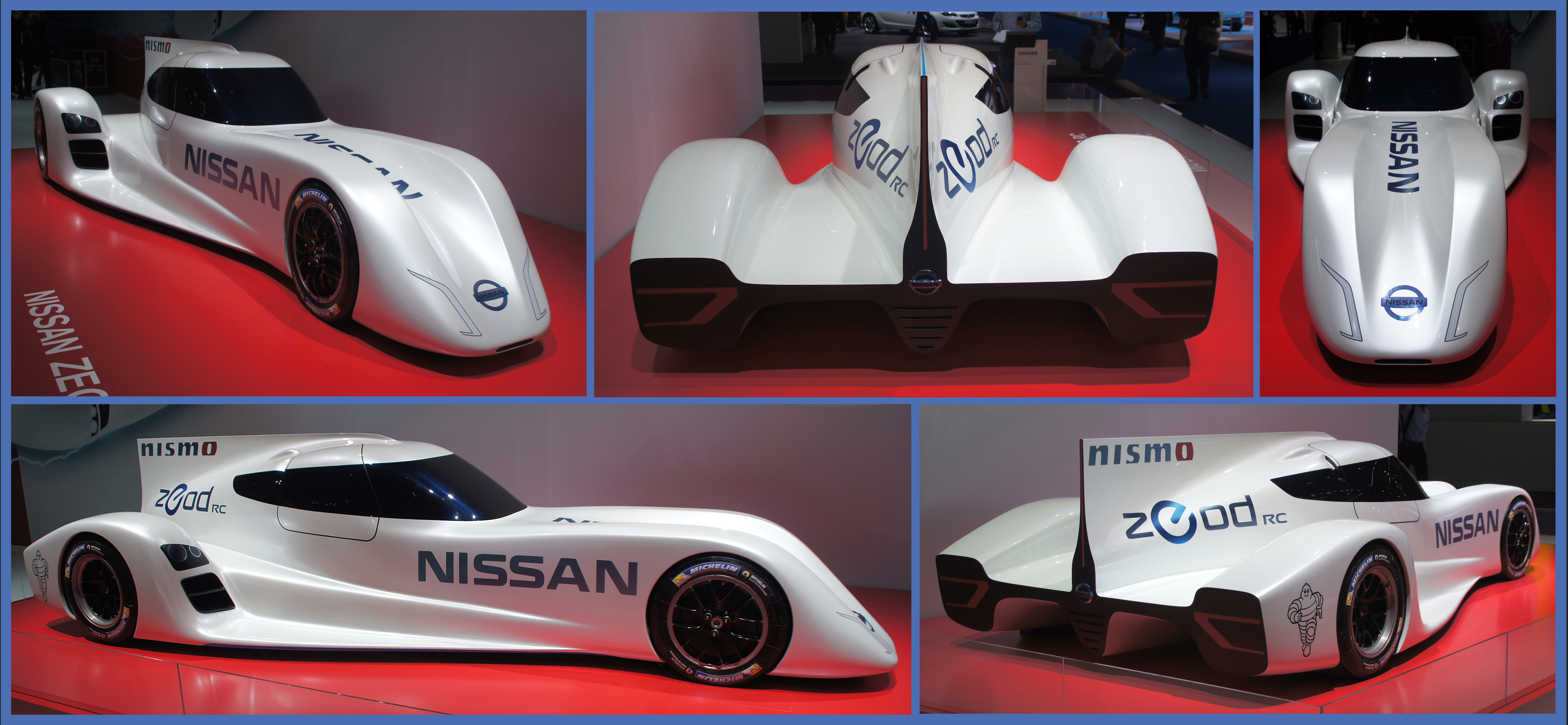
Nissan ZEOD RC, shown at Frankfurt Motor Show, 2013

The Nissan ZEOD RC (Zero Emission On Demand Racing Car) was a hybrid electric racing car that competed as the experimental 'Garage 56' entry at the 2014 24 Hours of Le Mans race. Garage 56 entries are not part of the official competition and some of the race's technical regulations therefore do not apply to them.

== History ==
The ZEOD RC was designed by Ben Bowlby. Bowlby had worked for DeltaWing LLC, a Chip Ganassi company created to develop a concept race car for the IndyCar Series' post-2012 chassis. When IndyCar awarded the tender to the Dallara DW12, Bowlby - working for DeltaWing Project 56 LLC, a consortium led by Don Panoz - adapted the DeltaWing design to race at Le Mans. Nissan Motor Company provided an engine for the Le Mans-specification DeltaWing, and received naming rights on the car, which raced as the Garage 56 entry at the 2012 24 Hours of Le Mans race.

During 2013, the Automobile Club de l'Ouest (ACO) announced that Nissan had been granted the Garage 56 entry for 2014 in its own right. Nissan unveiled their car for the race, known as the ZEOD RC, during the 2013 24 Hours of Le Mans weekend. The ZEOD RC utilized a hybrid electric drivetrain with lithium ion battery packs in a chassis similar in design to the DeltaWing. In a 22 June 2013 article at Autosport.com, Bowlby said: "This is a new car, but it uses the narrow track technology of the DeltaWing and that gives us great efficiency. It is something we understand and it is an efficient way of getting around Le Mans."

At the 2014 24 Hours of Le Mans, the ZEOD RC's first and only race, the car had to retire during the race's early hours due to a gearbox failure. However, it managed to achieve its goals of reaching a speed above 300 km/h and completing a lap at Circuit de la Sarthe (Le Mans) using electric power only.

== Drivetrain ==
The ZEOD RC was equipped with a Nissan DIG-T R 1.5-liter three-cylinder turbocharged gasoline engine. The engine produced 400 bhp despite weighing only 40 kg. The two electric motors had a combined output of 220 kW. The lithium-ion batteries had a capacity of 12.4 kWh.

== Lawsuit ==
The similarity of the ZEOD RC (and the BladeGlider concept road car) to the DeltaWing prompted a lawsuit, filed on 22 November 2013, by the DeltaWing consortium (Don Panoz and Chip Ganassi) against Ben Bowlby and Nissan for "damages and injunctive relief arising out of theft of confidential and proprietary information, misappropriation of trade secrets, breach of contracts, unjust enrichment, fraud, and negligent misrepresentation". The lawsuit was settled out of court for confidential terms in March 2016.

== Results summary ==
=== Complete 24 Hours of Le Mans results ===
Year	Entrant	Class	No.	Drivers	Pos.
2014	(Japan) Nissan Motorsports Global	CDNT	0	(Spain) Lucas Ordóñez (Belgium) Wolfgang Reip (Japan) Satoshi Motoyama	Ret

== See also ==
- DeltaWing, an earlier racing car with similar body shape also designed by Ben Bowlby and powered by a Nissan engine.
