= 2014 6 Hours of The Glen =

Sports Car race

Track Map of Watkins Glen International.

The 2014 Sahlen's Six Hours of The Glen was a sports car race sanctioned by the International Motor Sports Association (IMSA) held on the Watkins Glen International in Watkins Glen, New York on June 29, 2014. The event served as the seventh of thirteen scheduled rounds of the 2014 United SportsCar Championship.

== Background ==
=== Preview ===
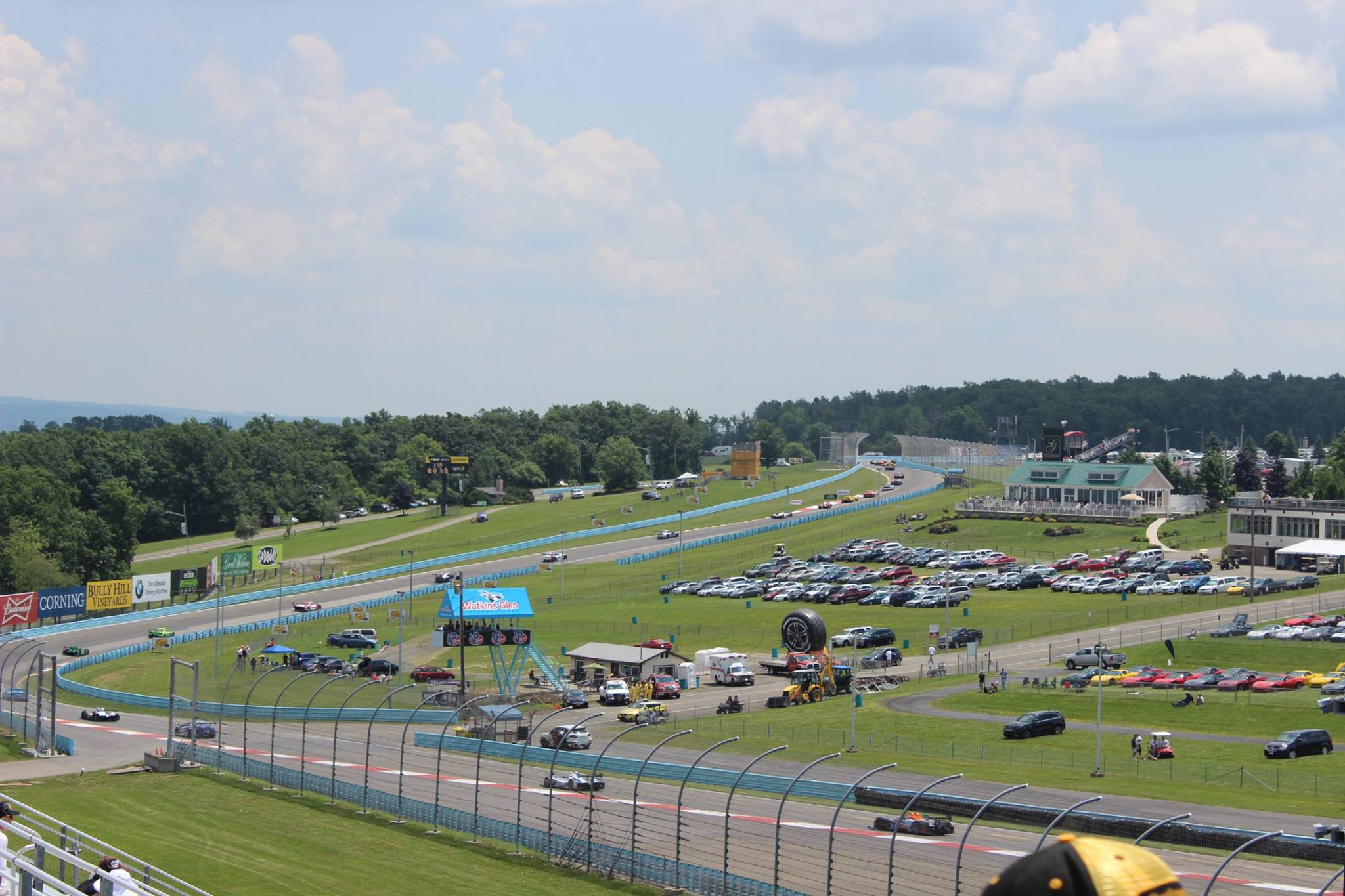
Watkins Glen International, where the race was held.

International Motor Sports Association (IMSA) president Scott Atherton confirmed that the race was part of the 2014 United SportsCar Championship schedule in October 2013. It was the first year the event was held as part of the Tudor United SportsCar Championship. The 2014 Sahlen's Six Hours of The Glen was the seventh of thirteen scheduled sports car races of 2014 by IMSA, and it was the third round held as part of the North American Endurance Cup. The event was held at the eleven-turn 3.450 mi (5.552 km) Watkins Glen International in Watkins Glen, New York on June 29, 2014.

Before the race, Jordan Taylor and Ricky Taylor led the Prototype Drivers' Championship with 160 points, 7 points clear of João Barbosa and Christian Fittipaldi in second, and Scott Pruett and Memo Rojas with 145 points. With 133 points, PC was led by Jon Bennett and Colin Braunwith a six-point advantage over Renger van der Zande. In GTLM, the Drivers' Championship was led by Bill Auberlen and Andy Priaulx with 123 points; the duo held a five-point gap over Antonio García and Jan Magnussen. Bill Sweedler and Townsend Bell led the GTD Drivers' Championship with 111 points, 1 point ahead of Leh Keen and Cooper MacNeil. Chevrolet, Porsche, and Ferrari were leading their respective Manufacturers' Championships, while Wayne Taylor Racing, CORE Autosport, BMW Team RLL, and AIM Autosport were their respective Teams' Championships.

=== Entry list ===
Fifty-five cars were officially entered for the Sahlen's Six Hours of The Glen, with the bulk of entries in the Prototype (P) and Grand Touring Daytona (GTD) classes. Action Express Racing (AER) fielded two Chevrolet Corvette DP cars while VisitFlorida Racing (VFR) and Wayne Taylor Racing (WTR) fielded one. Chip Ganassi Racing (CGR) and Michael Shank Racing (MSR) entered one Ford-powered Riley MkXXVI. Speedsource had two Lola B12/80 while Extreme Speed Motorsports (ESM) entered two HPD ARX-03b cars and OAK Racing entered one Morgan LMP2 chassis with Nissan VK45DE 4.5 L V8 engine. The DeltaWing car after skipping the Belle Isle round. The Prototype Challenge (PC) class was composed of ten Oreca FLM09 cars: two from Starworks Motorsport and RSR Racing. BAR1 Motorsports, CORE Autosport, JDC-Miller MotorSports, Performance Tech, PR1/Mathiasen Motorsports, and 8Star Motorsports entered one car each. GTLM was represented by eleven entries from five different brands. In the list of GTD entrants, twenty-one GT-specification vehicles were represented by six different manufacturers.

== Practice ==
There were three practice sessions preceding the start of the race on Sunday, two on Friday and one on Saturday. The first two one-hour sessions were on Friday afternoon and Saturday morning. The third on Saturday afternoon lasted an hour.

== Qualifying ==
Saturday afternoon's 80-minute four-group qualifying session gave 15-minute sessions to all categories. Cars in GTD were sent out first before those grouped in GTLM, PC, and Prototype had three separate identically timed sessions. Regulations stipulated teams to nominate one qualifying driver, with the fastest laps determining each classes starting order. IMSA would arranged the grid to put all Prototypes ahead of the PC, GTLM, and GTD cars.

=== Qualifying results ===
Pole positions in each class are indicated in bold and by ‡. P stands for Prototype, PC (Prototype Challenge), GTLM (Grand Touring Le Mans) and GTD (Grand Touring Daytona).

Pos.	Class	No.	Team	Driver	Time	Gap	Grid
1	**P**	**42**	**(France) OAK Racing**	**(United Kingdom) Alex Brundle**	**1:37.902**	**_**	1‡
2	P	5	(United States) Action Express Racing	(Brazil) Christian Fittipaldi	1:38.560	+0.658	2
3	P	90	(United States) Spirit of Daytona Racing	(Canada) Michael Valiante	1:38.692	+0.790	3
4	P	01	(United States) Chip Ganassi Racing with Felix Sabates	(United States) Scott Pruett	1:38.738	+0.836	4
5	P	1	(United States) Extreme Speed Motorsports	(United States) Scott Sharp	1:39.005	+1.103	5
6	P	10	(United States) Wayne Taylor Racing	(United States) Ricky Taylor	1:39.055	+1.153	6
7	P	2	(United States) Extreme Speed Motorsports	(United States) Johannes van Overbeek	1:39.143	+1.241	7
8	P	9	(United States) Action Express Racing	(United States) Jon Fogarty	1:39.454	+1.552	8
9	P	60	(United States) Michael Shank Racing with Curb/Agajanian	(Brazil) Oswaldo Negri Jr.	1:40.128	+2.226	9
10	P	0	(United States) DeltaWing Racing Cars	(United Kingdom) Katherine Legge	1:40.538	+2.636	10
11	**PC**	**54**	**(United States) CORE Autosport**	**(United States) Colin Braun**	**1:40.562**	**+2.660**	11‡
12	PC	25	(United States) 8Star Motorsports	(United Kingdom) Tom Kimber-Smith	1:40.823	+2.921	12
13	PC	8	(United States) Starworks Motorsport	(Netherlands) Renger van der Zande	1:40.955	+3.053	13
14	PC	7	(United States) Starworks Motorsport	(Australia) John Martin	1:41.041	+3.139	14
15	P	31	(United States) Marsh Racing	(United States) Eric Curran	1:41.341	+3.439	15
16	PC	52	(United States) PR1/Mathiasen Motorsports	(United States) Gunnar Jeannette	1:41.509	+3.607	16
17	PC	38	(United States) Performance Tech	(Canada) David Ostella	1:41.897	+3.995	17
18	PC	09	(United States) RSR Racing	(Brazil) Bruno Junqueira	1:42.076	+4.174	18
19	PC	88	(United States) BAR1 Motorsports	(United Kingdom) Martin Plowman	1:42.268	+4.366	19
20	P	07	(United States) Speedsource	(United States) Joel Miller	1:43.788	+5.886	20
21	**GTLM**	**55**	**(United States) BMW Team RLL**	**(United Kingdom) Andy Priaulx**	**1:44.084**	**+6.182**	21‡
22	GTLM	3	(United States) Corvette Racing	(Denmark) Jan Magnussen	1:44.376	+6.474	22
23	GTLM	56	(United States) BMW Team RLL	(Germany) Dirk Müller	1:44.377	+6.475	23
24	GTLM	912	(United States) Porsche North America	(Denmark) Michael Christensen	1:44.482	+6.580	24
25	GTLM	93	(United States) SRT Motorsports	(United States) Jonathan Bomarito	1:44.606	+6.704	25
26	GTLM	91	(United States) SRT Motorsports	(Germany) Dominik Farnbacher	1:44.755	+6.853	26
27	GTLM	4	(United States) Corvette Racing	(United States) Tommy Milner	1:44.783	+6.881	27
28	GTLM	62	(United States) Risi Competizione	(Germany) Pierre Kaffer	1:44.950	+7.048	28
29	GTLM	17	(United States) Team Falken Tire	(United States) Bryan Sellers	1:45.134	+7.232	29
30	GTLM	911	(United States) Porsche North America	(Austria) Richard Lietz	1:45.219	+7.317	30
31	P	70	(United States) Speedsource	(Canada) Sylvain Tremblay	1:45.825	+7.923	31
32	**GTD**	**22**	**(United States) Alex Job Racing**	**(United States) Leh Keen**	**1:48.831**	**+10.929**	32‡
33	GTD	94	(United States) Turner Motorsport	(United States) Dane Cameron	1:49.023	+11.121	33
34	GTD	33	(United States) Riley Motorsports	(Netherlands) Jeroen Bleekemolen	1:49.119	+11.217	34
35	GTD	45	(United States) Flying Lizard Motorsports	(United States) Spencer Pumpelly	1:49.253	+11.351	35
36	GTD	44	(United States) Magnus Racing	(United States) Andy Lally	1:49.371	+11.469	36
37	GTLM	57	(United States) Krohn Racing	(United States) Tracy Krohn	1:49.558	+11.686	37
38	GTD	35	(United States) Flying Lizard Motorsports	(South Africa) Dion von Moltke	1:49.783	+11.861	38
39	GTD	555	(Canada) AIM Autosport	(United States) Townsend Bell	1:49.850	+11.948	39
40	GTD	007	(United States) TRG-AMR North America	(Australia) James Davison	1:50.020	+12.118	40
41	GTD	23	(United States) Team Seattle/Alex Job Racing	(Germany) Mario Farnbacher	1:50.024	+12.122	41
42	GTD	63	(United States) Scuderia Corsa	(Italy) Alessandro Balzan	1:50.025	+12.123	42
43	GTD	27	(United States) Dempsey Racing	(United States) Andrew Davis	1:50.050	+12.148	43
44	GTD	58	(United States) Snow Racing	(Belgium) Jan Heylen	1:50.450	+12.548	44
45	GTD	81	(United States) GB Autosport	(Republic of Ireland) Damien Faulkner	1:50.456	+12.544	45
46	GTD	46	(United States) Fall-Line Motorsports	(United States) Charles Espenlaub	1:50.589	+12.687	46
47	GTD	30	(United States) NGT Motorsport	(Poland) Kuba Giermaziak	1:51.009	+13.107	47
48	GTD	48	(United States) Paul Miller Racing	(United States) Bryce Miller	1:51.347	+13.445	54
49	GTD	73	(United States) Park Place Motorsports	(Netherlands) Jaap van Lagen	1:51.502	+13.600	48
50	GTD	18	(Belgium) Mühlner Motorsports America	(United States) Peter Ludwig	1:53.744	+15.842	49
51	GTD	51	(Switzerland) Spirit of Race	(South Africa) Jack Gerber	1:56.625	+18.723	50
52	PC	08	(United States) RSR Racing	None	No Time Established		51
53	PC	85	(United States) JDC-Miller MotorSports	None	No Time Established		52
54	GTD	19	(Belgium) Mühlner Motorsports America	None	No Time Established		54
55	GTD	71	(United States) Park Place Motorsports	None	No Time Established		55

== Race ==
=== Race results ===
Class winners are denoted in bold and ‡. P stands for Prototype, PC (Prototype Challenge), GTLM (Grand Touring Le Mans) and GTD (Grand Touring Daytona).

Pos	Class	No.	Team	Drivers	Chassis	Tire	Laps
Pos	Class	No.	Team	Drivers	Engine	Tire	Laps
1	**P**	**90**	**(United States) Spirit of Daytona Racing**	**(Canada) Michael Valiante (United Kingdom) Richard Westbrook**	**Chevrolet Corvette DP**	C	**191‡**
1	**P**	**90**	**(United States) Spirit of Daytona Racing**	**(Canada) Michael Valiante (United Kingdom) Richard Westbrook**	**Chevrolet LS9 5.5 L V8**	C	**191‡**
2	P	42	(France) OAK Racing	(United Kingdom) Alex Brundle (China) Ho-Pin Tung (Colombia) Gustavo Yacamán	Morgan LMP2	C	191
2	P	42	(France) OAK Racing	(United Kingdom) Alex Brundle (China) Ho-Pin Tung (Colombia) Gustavo Yacamán	Nissan VK45DE 4.5 L V8	C	191
3	P	5	(United States) Action Express Racing	(Portugal) João Barbosa (Brazil) Christian Fittipaldi (United States) Burt Frisselle	Chevrolet Corvette DP	C	191
3	P	5	(United States) Action Express Racing	(Portugal) João Barbosa (Brazil) Christian Fittipaldi (United States) Burt Frisselle	Chevrolet LS9 5.5 L V8	C	191
4	P	9	(United States) Action Express Racing	(United States) Brian Frisselle (United States) Burt Frisselle (United States) Jon Fogarty	Chevrolet Corvette DP	C	191
4	P	9	(United States) Action Express Racing	(United States) Brian Frisselle (United States) Burt Frisselle (United States) Jon Fogarty	Chevrolet LS9 5.5 L V8	C	191
5	P	10	(United States) Wayne Taylor Racing	(United States) Ricky Taylor (United States) Jordan Taylor (Italy) Max Angelelli	Chevrolet Corvette DP	C	190
5	P	10	(United States) Wayne Taylor Racing	(United States) Ricky Taylor (United States) Jordan Taylor (Italy) Max Angelelli	Chevrolet LS9 5.5 L V8	C	190
6	**PC**	**54**	**(United States) CORE Autosport**	**(United States) Colin Braun (United States) Jon Bennett (United States) James Gue**	**Oreca FLM09**	C	**186‡**
6	**PC**	**54**	**(United States) CORE Autosport**	**(United States) Colin Braun (United States) Jon Bennett (United States) James Gue**	**Chevrolet 6.2 L V8**	C	**186‡**
7	PC	88	(United States) BAR1 Motorsports	(United States) Doug Bielefeld (United States) David Cheng (United Kingdom) Martin Plowman	Oreca FLM09	C	186
7	PC	88	(United States) BAR1 Motorsports	(United States) Doug Bielefeld (United States) David Cheng (United Kingdom) Martin Plowman	Chevrolet 6.2 L V8	C	186
8	PC	52	(United States) PR1/Mathiasen Motorsports	(United States) Gunnar Jeannette (United States) Frankie Montecalvo	Oreca FLM09	C	186
8	PC	52	(United States) PR1/Mathiasen Motorsports	(United States) Gunnar Jeannette (United States) Frankie Montecalvo	Chevrolet 6.2 L V8	C	186
9	PC	38	(United States) Performance Tech	(Canada) David Ostella (United States) Mike Hedlund	Oreca FLM09	C	186
9	PC	38	(United States) Performance Tech	(Canada) David Ostella (United States) Mike Hedlund	Chevrolet 6.2 L V8	C	186
10	PC	7	(United States) Starworks Motorsport	(United Kingdom) Sam Bird (Mexico) Martin Fuentes	Oreca FLM09	C	185
10	PC	7	(United States) Starworks Motorsport	(United Kingdom) Sam Bird (Mexico) Martin Fuentes	Chevrolet 6.2 L V8	C	185
11	**GTLM**	**3**	**(United States) Corvette Racing**	**(Spain) Antonio García (Denmark) Jan Magnussen**	**Chevrolet Corvette C7.R**	MI	**185‡**
11	**GTLM**	**3**	**(United States) Corvette Racing**	**(Spain) Antonio García (Denmark) Jan Magnussen**	**Chevrolet LT5.5 5.5 L V8**	MI	**185‡**
12	GTLM	91	(United States) SRT Motorsports	(Belgium) Marc Goossens (Germany) Dominik Farnbacher (United States) Jonathan Bomarito	SRT Viper GTS-R	MI	185
12	GTLM	91	(United States) SRT Motorsports	(Belgium) Marc Goossens (Germany) Dominik Farnbacher (United States) Jonathan Bomarito	SRT 8.0 L V10	MI	185
13	GTLM	93	(United States) SRT Motorsports	(United States) Jonathan Bomarito (Canada) Kuno Wittmer (Belgium) Marc Goossens	SRT Viper GTS-R	MI	185
13	GTLM	93	(United States) SRT Motorsports	(United States) Jonathan Bomarito (Canada) Kuno Wittmer (Belgium) Marc Goossens	SRT 8.0 L V10	MI	185
14	GTLM	4	(United States) Corvette Racing	(United Kingdom) Oliver Gavin (United States) Tommy Milner	Chevrolet Corvette C7.R	MI	185
14	GTLM	4	(United States) Corvette Racing	(United Kingdom) Oliver Gavin (United States) Tommy Milner	Chevrolet LT5.5 5.5 L V8	MI	185
15	GTLM	911	(United States) Porsche North America	(United Kingdom) Nick Tandy (Austria) Richard Lietz (France) Patrick Pilet	Porsche 911 RSR	MI	185
15	GTLM	911	(United States) Porsche North America	(United Kingdom) Nick Tandy (Austria) Richard Lietz (France) Patrick Pilet	Porsche 4.0 L Flat-6	MI	185
16	GTLM	56	(United States) BMW Team RLL	(United States) John Edwards (Germany) Dirk Müller	BMW Z4 GTE	MI	185
16	GTLM	56	(United States) BMW Team RLL	(United States) John Edwards (Germany) Dirk Müller	BMW 4.4 L V8	MI	185
17	GTLM	62	(United States) Risi Competizione	(Italy) Giancarlo Fisichella (Germany) Pierre Kaffer	Ferrari 458 Italia GT2	MI	185
17	GTLM	62	(United States) Risi Competizione	(Italy) Giancarlo Fisichella (Germany) Pierre Kaffer	Ferrari 4.5 L V8	MI	185
18	P	31	(United States) Marsh Racing	(United States) Eric Curran (United States) Boris Said (United States) Guy Cosmo	Chevrolet Corvette DP	C	184
18	P	31	(United States) Marsh Racing	(United States) Eric Curran (United States) Boris Said (United States) Guy Cosmo	Chevrolet LS9 5.5 L V8	C	184
19	GTLM	912	(United States) Porsche North America	(United States) Patrick Long (Denmark) Michael Christensen (France) Patrick Pilet	Porsche 911 RSR	MI	184
19	GTLM	912	(United States) Porsche North America	(United States) Patrick Long (Denmark) Michael Christensen (France) Patrick Pilet	Porsche 4.0 L Flat-6	MI	184
20	GTLM	17	(United States) Team Falken Tire	(Germany) Wolf Henzler (United States) Bryan Sellers	Porsche 911 RSR	FAL	184
20	GTLM	17	(United States) Team Falken Tire	(Germany) Wolf Henzler (United States) Bryan Sellers	Porsche 4.0 L Flat-6	FAL	184
21	GTLM	55	(United States) BMW Team RLL	(United States) Bill Auberlen (United Kingdom) Andy Priaulx	BMW Z4 GTE	MI	184
21	GTLM	55	(United States) BMW Team RLL	(United States) Bill Auberlen (United Kingdom) Andy Priaulx	BMW 4.4 L V8	MI	184
22	PC	85	(United States) JDC-Miller MotorSports	(United States) Chris Miller (South Africa) Stephen Simpson (United States) Tomy Drissi	Oreca FLM09	C	181
22	PC	85	(United States) JDC-Miller MotorSports	(United States) Chris Miller (South Africa) Stephen Simpson (United States) Tomy Drissi	Chevrolet 6.2 L V8	C	181
23 DNF	PC	8	(United States) Starworks Motorsport	(Germany) Mirco Schultis (Netherlands) Renger van der Zande	Oreca FLM09	C	180
23 DNF	PC	8	(United States) Starworks Motorsport	(Germany) Mirco Schultis (Netherlands) Renger van der Zande	Chevrolet 6.2 L V8	C	180
24	P	60	(United States) Michael Shank Racing with Curb/Agajanian	(Brazil) Oswaldo Negri Jr. (United States) John Pew	Riley MkXXVI	C	179
24	P	60	(United States) Michael Shank Racing with Curb/Agajanian	(Brazil) Oswaldo Negri Jr. (United States) John Pew	Ford EcoBoost 3.5 L Turbo V6	C	179
25	**GTD**	**94**	**(United States) Turner Motorsport**	**(United States) Dane Cameron (Finland) Markus Palttala**	**BMW Z4 GT3**	C	**178‡**
25	**GTD**	**94**	**(United States) Turner Motorsport**	**(United States) Dane Cameron (Finland) Markus Palttala**	**BMW 4.4 L V8**	C	**178‡**
26	GTD	555	(Canada) AIM Autosport	(United States) Townsend Bell (United States) Bill Sweedler	Ferrari 458 Italia GT3	C	178
26	GTD	555	(Canada) AIM Autosport	(United States) Townsend Bell (United States) Bill Sweedler	Ferrari 4.5L V8	C	178
27	GTD	44	(United States) Magnus Racing	(United States) Andy Lally (United States) John Potter (Germany) Sebastian Asch	Porsche 911 GT America	C	177
27	GTD	44	(United States) Magnus Racing	(United States) Andy Lally (United States) John Potter (Germany) Sebastian Asch	Porsche 4.0L Flat-6	C	177
28	GTD	27	(United States) Dempsey Racing	(United States) Patrick Dempsey (United States) Joe Foster (United States) Andrew Davis	Porsche 911 GT America	C	177
28	GTD	27	(United States) Dempsey Racing	(United States) Patrick Dempsey (United States) Joe Foster (United States) Andrew Davis	Porsche 4.0L Flat-6	C	177
29	GTD	63	(United States) Scuderia Corsa	(Italy) Alessandro Balzan (United States) Jeff Westphal (United States) Brandon Davis	Ferrari 458 Italia GT3	C	177
29	GTD	63	(United States) Scuderia Corsa	(Italy) Alessandro Balzan (United States) Jeff Westphal (United States) Brandon Davis	Ferrari 4.5L V8	C	177
30 DNF	P	01	(United States) Chip Ganassi Racing with Felix Sabates	(United States) Scott Pruett (Mexico) Memo Rojas (United States) Sage Karam	Riley MkXXVI	C	175
30 DNF	P	01	(United States) Chip Ganassi Racing with Felix Sabates	(United States) Scott Pruett (Mexico) Memo Rojas (United States) Sage Karam	Ford EcoBoost 3.5 L Turbo V6	C	175
31	GTD	30	(United States) NGT Motorsport	(Poland) Kuba Giermaziak (Denmark) Christina Nielsen	Porsche 911 GT America	C	175
31	GTD	30	(United States) NGT Motorsport	(Poland) Kuba Giermaziak (Denmark) Christina Nielsen	Porsche 4.0L Flat-6	C	175
32	GTD	35	(United States) Flying Lizard Motorsports	(South Africa) Dion von Moltke (United States) Seth Neiman (United States) Spencer Pumpelly	Audi R8 LMS ultra	C	175
32	GTD	35	(United States) Flying Lizard Motorsports	(South Africa) Dion von Moltke (United States) Seth Neiman (United States) Spencer Pumpelly	Audi 5.2 L V10	C	175
33	P	07	(United States) Speedsource	(United States) Tristan Nunez (United States) Joel Miller (France) Tristan Vautier	Mazda Prototype	C	175
33	P	07	(United States) Speedsource	(United States) Tristan Nunez (United States) Joel Miller (France) Tristan Vautier	Mazda Skyactiv-D 2.2 L Turbo I4 (Diesel)	C	175
34 DNF	PC	08	(United States) RSR Racing	(Canada) Chris Cumming (Canada) Alex Tagliani (United States) Rusty Mitchell	Oreca FLM09	C	174
34 DNF	PC	08	(United States) RSR Racing	(Canada) Chris Cumming (Canada) Alex Tagliani (United States) Rusty Mitchell	Chevrolet 6.2 L V8	C	174
35	GTLM	57	(United States) Krohn Racing	(Sweden) Niclas Jönsson (United States) Tracy Krohn	Ferrari 458 Italia GT2	MI	174
35	GTLM	57	(United States) Krohn Racing	(Sweden) Niclas Jönsson (United States) Tracy Krohn	Ferrari 4.5 L V8	MI	174
36	GTD	48	(United States) Paul Miller Racing	(Germany) Christopher Haase (United States) Bryce Miller	Audi R8 LMS ultra	C	173
36	GTD	48	(United States) Paul Miller Racing	(Germany) Christopher Haase (United States) Bryce Miller	Audi 5.2 L V10	C	173
37	GTD	81	(United States) GB Autosport	(Republic of Ireland) Damien Faulkner (United Kingdom) Ben Barker (United States) Michael Avenatti	Porsche 911 GT America	C	171
37	GTD	81	(United States) GB Autosport	(Republic of Ireland) Damien Faulkner (United Kingdom) Ben Barker (United States) Michael Avenatti	Porsche 4.0L Flat-6	C	171
38 DNF	PC	09	(United States) RSR Racing	(United States) Duncan Ende (Brazil) Bruno Junqueira (United Kingdom) Ryan Lewis	Oreca FLM09	C	170
38 DNF	PC	09	(United States) RSR Racing	(United States) Duncan Ende (Brazil) Bruno Junqueira (United Kingdom) Ryan Lewis	Chevrolet 6.2 L V8	C	170
39	GTD	46	(United States) Fall-Line Motorsports	(United States) Charles Espenlaub (United States) Charles Putman (Italy) Marco Bonanomi	Audi R8 LMS ultra	C	170
39	GTD	46	(United States) Fall-Line Motorsports	(United States) Charles Espenlaub (United States) Charles Putman (Italy) Marco Bonanomi	Audi 5.2 L V10	C	170
40	P	1	(United States) Extreme Speed Motorsports	(United Kingdom) Ryan Dalziel (United States) Scott Sharp	HPD ARX-03b	C	168
40	P	1	(United States) Extreme Speed Motorsports	(United Kingdom) Ryan Dalziel (United States) Scott Sharp	Honda HR28TT 2.8 L Turbo V6	C	168
41	GTD	007	(United States) TRG-AMR North America	(Australia) James Davison (United States) Al Carter (United States) David Block	Aston Martin V12 Vantage GT3	C	168
41	GTD	007	(United States) TRG-AMR North America	(Australia) James Davison (United States) Al Carter (United States) David Block	Aston Martin 6.0 L V12	C	168
42	P	2	(United States) Extreme Speed Motorsports	(United States) Ed Brown (United States) Johannes van Overbeek (United States) Anthony Lazzaro	HPD ARX-03b	C	160
42	P	2	(United States) Extreme Speed Motorsports	(United States) Ed Brown (United States) Johannes van Overbeek (United States) Anthony Lazzaro	Honda HR28TT 2.8 L Turbo V6	C	160
43	PC	25	(United States) 8Star Motorsports	(United Kingdom) Tom Kimber-Smith (United States) Sean Rayhall (United States) Eric Lux	Oreca FLM09	C	158
43	PC	25	(United States) 8Star Motorsports	(United Kingdom) Tom Kimber-Smith (United States) Sean Rayhall (United States) Eric Lux	Chevrolet 6.2 L V8	C	158
44	GTD	22	(United States) Alex Job Racing	(United States) Cooper MacNeil (United States) Leh Keen (Switzerland) Philipp Frommenwiler	Porsche 911 GT America	C	156
44	GTD	22	(United States) Alex Job Racing	(United States) Cooper MacNeil (United States) Leh Keen (Switzerland) Philipp Frommenwiler	Porsche 4.0L Flat-6	C	156
45	GTD	58	(United States) Snow Racing	(Belgium) Jan Heylen (United States) Madison Snow	Porsche 911 GT America	C	149
45	GTD	58	(United States) Snow Racing	(Belgium) Jan Heylen (United States) Madison Snow	Porsche 4.0L Flat-6	C	149
46	GTD	45	(United States) Flying Lizard Motorsports	(Venezuela) Nelson Canache Jr. (United States) Spencer Pumpelly (United States) Brett Sandberg	Audi R8 LMS ultra	C	141
46	GTD	45	(United States) Flying Lizard Motorsports	(Venezuela) Nelson Canache Jr. (United States) Spencer Pumpelly (United States) Brett Sandberg	Audi 5.2 L V10	C	141
47	GTD	18	(Belgium) Mühlner Motorsports America	(Australia) David Calvert-Jones (United States) Peter Ludwig (Haiti) Patrick-Otto Madsen	Porsche 911 GT America	C	137
47	GTD	18	(Belgium) Mühlner Motorsports America	(Australia) David Calvert-Jones (United States) Peter Ludwig (Haiti) Patrick-Otto Madsen	Porsche 4.0L Flat-6	C	137
48 DNF	GTD	23	(United States) Team Seattle/Alex Job Racing	(Germany) Mario Farnbacher (United Kingdom) Ian James	Porsche 911 GT America	C	124
48 DNF	GTD	23	(United States) Team Seattle/Alex Job Racing	(Germany) Mario Farnbacher (United Kingdom) Ian James	Porsche 4.0L Flat-6	C	124
49 DNF	GTD	33	(United States) Riley Motorsports	(Netherlands) Jeroen Bleekemolen (United States) Ben Keating	SRT Viper GT3-R	C	91
49 DNF	GTD	33	(United States) Riley Motorsports	(Netherlands) Jeroen Bleekemolen (United States) Ben Keating	SRT 8.0 L V10	C	91
50 DNF	P	0	(United States) DeltaWing Racing Cars	(United Kingdom) Katherine Legge (Colombia) Gabby Chaves	DeltaWing DWC13	C	74
50 DNF	P	0	(United States) DeltaWing Racing Cars	(United Kingdom) Katherine Legge (Colombia) Gabby Chaves	Élan (Mazda) 1.9 L I4 Turbo	C	74
51 DNF	GTD	73	(United States) Park Place Motorsports	(United States) Patrick Lindsey (United States) Jim Norman (Netherlands) Jaap van Lagen	Porsche 911 GT America	C	57
51 DNF	GTD	73	(United States) Park Place Motorsports	(United States) Patrick Lindsey (United States) Jim Norman (Netherlands) Jaap van Lagen	Porsche 4.0L Flat-6	C	57
52 DNF	GTD	51	(Switzerland) Spirit of Race	(South Africa) Jack Gerber (Republic of Ireland) Matt Griffin (Italy) Michele Rugolo	Ferrari 458 Italia GT3	C	48
52 DNF	GTD	51	(Switzerland) Spirit of Race	(South Africa) Jack Gerber (Republic of Ireland) Matt Griffin (Italy) Michele Rugolo	Ferrari 4.5L V8	C	48
53	P	70	(United States) Speedsource	(Canada) Sylvain Tremblay (United States) Tom Long (United Kingdom) Ben Devlin	Mazda Prototype	C	13
53	P	70	(United States) Speedsource	(Canada) Sylvain Tremblay (United States) Tom Long (United Kingdom) Ben Devlin	Mazda Skyactiv-D 2.2 L Turbo I4 (Diesel)	C	13

Tyre manufacturers
Key
Symbol	Tyre manufacturer
**C**	Continental
**MI**	Michelin
**FAL**	Falken Tire

United SportsCar Championship
Previous race: Kansas Grand Prix	2014 season	Next race: SportsCar Grand Prix
