= 2014 Monterey Grand Prix =

Sports Car races

Track map of Mazda Raceway Laguna Seca

The 2014 Continental Tire Monterey Grand Prix were a pair of sports car races sanctioned by the International Motor Sports Association (IMSA) held on the Mazda Raceway Laguna Seca in Monterey, California on May 4, 2014. The events served as the fourth of thirteen scheduled rounds of the 2014 United SportsCar Championship. Both races were contested over two hours. The race marked the first time that the course had been used for IMSA racing and the first time that the venue had featured a doubleheader weekend with two races.

== Background ==
=== Preview ===
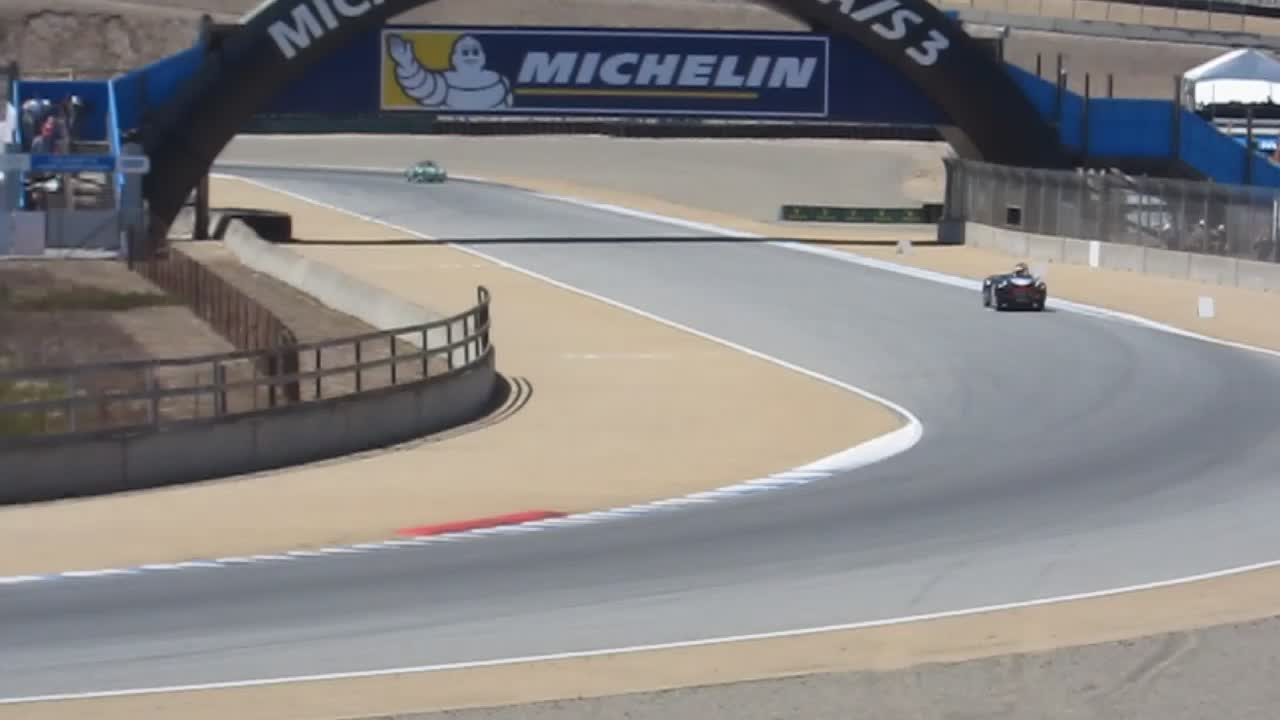
Mazda Raceway Laguna Seca, where the race was held.

International Motor Sports Association (IMSA) president Scott Atherton confirmed that the race was part of the 2014 United SportsCar Championship schedule in September 2013. It was the first year the event was held as part of the Tudor United SportsCar Championship. The 2014 Continental Tire Monterey Grand Prix was the fourth of thirteen scheduled sports car races of 2014 by IMSA, and it was the second round not held as part of the North American Endurance Cup. The events were held at the eleven-turn 2.238 mi (3.602 km) Mazda Raceway Laguna Seca in Monterey County, California on May 4, 2014. Due to the field size, IMSA would use a doubleheader race format where the Prototype Challenge and GTD classes would participate in the first event while the Prototype and GTLM classes would participate in the second event.

Before the race, João Barbosa and Christian Fittipaldi led the Prototype Drivers' Championship with 98 points, 5 points clear of Scott Pruett and Memo Rojas in second, and Jordan Taylor and Ricky Taylor with 91 points. With 101 points, PC was led by Jon Bennett, Colin Braun, and James Gue with an twelve-point advantage over Tom Kimber-Smith and Michael Marsal. In GTLM, the Drivers' Championship was led by Bill Auberlen and Andy Priaulx with 90 points; the duo held an two-point gap over Nick Tandy and Richard Lietz. Bill Sweedler and Townsend Bell led the GTD Drivers' Championship, ahead of Marco Seefried with 67 points followed by Maurizio Mediani with 62 points. Ford, BMW, and Ferrari were leading their respective Manufacturers' Championships, while Action Express Racing, CORE Autosport, BMW Team RLL, and AIM Autosport each led their own Teams' Championships.

=== Entry list ===
Fifty-five cars were officially entered for the Continental Tire Monterey Grand Prix, with the bulk of entries in the Prototype (P) and Grand Touring Daytona (GTD) classes. Since the majority of the remaining rounds of the 2014 United SportsCar Championship were sprint races, PC and GTD teams entered their regular driver pairings for the first time this season. Action Express Racing (AER) fielded two Chevrolet Corvette DP cars while VisitFlorida Racing (VFR) and Wayne Taylor Racing (WTR) fielded one. Chip Ganassi Racing (CGR) and Michael Shank Racing (MSR) entered one Ford-powered Riley MkXXVI. Mazda Motorsports had two Lola B12/80 while Extreme Speed Motorsports (ESM) entered two HPD ARX-03b cars and OAK Racing entered one Morgan LMP2 chassis with Nissan VK45DE 4.5 L V8 engine. The DeltaWing car after skipping the previous round at Long Beach. The Prototype Challenge (PC) class was composed of ten Oreca FLM09 cars: two from Starworks Motorsport and RSR Racing. BAR1 Motorsports, CORE Autosport, JDC-Miller MotorSports, Performance Tech, PR1/Mathiasen Motorsports, and 8Star Motorsports entered one car each. GTLM was represented by eleven entries from five different brands. Pierre Kaffer joined Giancarlo Fisichella in the Risi Competizione Ferrari. In the list of GTD entrants, twenty-one GT-specification vehicles were represented by six different manufacturers. Although it was listed as an entrant, the No. 009 TGR Aston Martin withdrew from the event.

== Practice ==
There were two practice sessions preceding the start of the races on Sunday: both on Saturday.The first one-hour session was on Saturday morning while the second one-hour session ran on Saturday afternoon.

== Qualifying ==
Saturday afternoon's 80-minute four-group qualifying session gave 15-minute sessions to all categories. Cars in GTD were sent out first before those grouped in GTLM, PC, and Prototype had three separate identically timed sessions. Regulations stipulated teams to nominate one qualifying driver, with the fastest laps determining each classes starting order.

=== Qualifying results ===
Pole positions in each class are indicated in bold and by ‡. P stands for Prototype, PC (Prototype Challenge), GTLM (Grand Touring Le Mans) and GTD (Grand Touring Daytona).

Pos.	Class	No.	Team	Driver	Time	Gap	Grid
1	**P**	**2**	**(United States) Extreme Speed Motorsports**	**(United States) Johannes van Overbeek**	**1:18.561**	—	**1‡ (2)**
2	P	90	(United States) Spirit of Daytona Racing	(United Kingdom) Richard Westbrook	1:18.788	+0.227	2 **(2)**
3	P	1	(United States) Extreme Speed Motorsports	(United Kingdom) Ryan Dalziel	1:18.970	+0.409	3 **(2)**
4	P	42	(France) OAK Racing	(Colombia) Gustavo Yacamán	1:19.076	+0.515	4 **(2)**
5	P	5	(United States) Action Express Racing	(Brazil) Christian Fittipaldi	1:19.175	+0.614	5 **(2)**
6	P	10	(United States) Wayne Taylor Racing	(United States) Ricky Taylor	1:19.504	+0.943	6 **(2)**
7	**PC**	**09**	**(United States) RSR Racing**	**(Brazil) Bruno Junqueira**	**1:19.723**	**+1.162**	**1‡ (1)**
8	P	01	(United States) Chip Ganassi Racing with Felix Sabates	(Mexico) Memo Rojas	1:19.962	+1.401	7 **(2)**
9	P	60	(United States) Michael Shank Racing with Curb/Agajanian	(Brazil) Oswaldo Negri Jr.	1:10.107	+1.546	8 **(2)**
10	PC	8	(United States) Starworks Motorsport	(Netherlands) Renger van der Zande	1:20.117	+1.556	**2 (1)**
11	P	0	(United States) DeltaWing Racing Cars	(United Kingdom) Katherine Legge	1:20.327	+1.766	9 (2)
12	PC	25	(United States) 8Star Motorsports	(United States) Sean Rayhall	1:20.421	+1.860	**3 (1)**
13	PC	54	(United States) CORE Autosport	(United States) Colin Braun	1:20.453	+1.892	**4 (1)**
14	PC	08	(United States) RSR Racing	(Canada) Alex Tagliani	1:20.568	+2.007	**5 (1)**
15	PC	38	(United States) Performance Tech	(Canada) David Ostella	1:20.836	+2.275	**6 (1)**
16	PC	52	(United States) PR1/Mathiasen Motorsports	(United States) Gunnar Jeannette	1:20.933	+2.372	**7 (1)**
17	PC	85	(United States) JDC-Miller MotorSports	(South Africa) Stephen Simpson	1:21.261	+2.700	**8 (1)**
18	P	31	(United States) Marsh Racing	(United States) Boris Said	1:21.393	+2.832	10 (2)
19	P	07	(United States) Speedsource	(United States) Tristan Nunez	1:22.010	+3.449	11 (2)
20	**GTLM**	**3**	**(United States) Corvette Racing**	**(Spain) Antonio García**	**1:22.373**	**+3.812**	12‡ (2)
21	GTLM	56	(United States) BMW Team RLL	(United States) John Edwards	1:22.578	+4.017	13 (2)
22	GTLM	911	(United States) Porsche North America	(United Kingdom) Nick Tandy	1:22.678	+4.117	14 (2)
23	GTLM	4	(United States) Corvette Racing	(United Kingdom) Oliver Gavin	1:22.768	+4.207	15 (2)
24	GTLM	55	(United States) BMW Team RLL	(United Kingdom) Andy Priaulx	1:22.810	+4.249	16 (2)
25	GTLM	91	(United States) SRT Motorsports	(Germany) Dominik Farnbacher	1:23.076	+4.515	17 (2)
26	GTLM	62	(United States) Risi Competizione	(Italy) Giancarlo Fisichella	1:23.142	+4.581	23 (2)
27	GTLM	912	(United States) Porsche North America	(United States) Patrick Long	1:23.263	+4.702	18 (2)
28	GTLM	93	(United States) SRT Motorsports	(United States) Jonathan Bomarito	1:23.341	+4.780	19 (2)
29	GTLM	17	(United States) Team Falken Tire	(Germany) Wolf Henzler	1:23.660	+5.099	20 (2)
30	P	70	(United States) Speedsource	(Canada) Sylvain Tremblay	1:26.302	+7.741	21 (2)
31	**GTD**	**45**	**(United States) Flying Lizard Motorsports**	**(United States) Spencer Pumpelly**	**1:26.695**	**+8.134**	**9‡ (1)**
32	GTD	22	(United States) Alex Job Racing	(United States) Leh Keen	1:26.962	+8.401	**10 (1)**
33	GTD	48	(United States) Paul Miller Racing	(Germany) Christopher Haase	1:27.101	+8.540	**11 (1)**
34	GTD	64	(United States) Scuderia Corsa	(Canada) Kyle Marcelli	1:27.121	+8.560	**12 (1)**
35	GTD	35	(United States) Flying Lizard Motorsports	(South Africa) Dion von Moltke	1:27.121	+8.560	**13 (1)**
36	GTD	33	(United States) Riley Motorsports	(Netherlands) Jeroen Bleekemolen	1:27.327	+8.766	**14 (1)**
37	GTD	58	(United States) Snow Racing	(Belgium) Jan Heylen	1:27.371	+8.810	**15 (1)**
38	GTD	30	(United States) NGT Motorsport	(Poland) Kuba Giermaziak	1:27.416	+8.855	**16 (1)**
39	GTD	44	(United States) Magnus Racing	(United States) Andy Lally	1:27.448	+8.887	**17 (1)**
40	GTD	94	(United States) Turner Motorsport	(United States) Dane Cameron	1:27.471	+8.910	**18 (1)**
41	GTD	23	(United States) Team Seattle/Alex Job Racing	(Germany) Mario Farnbacher	1:27.549	+8.988	**19 (1)**
42	GTD	81	(United States) GB Autosport	(Republic of Ireland) Damien Faulkner	1:27.750	+9.189	**20 (1)**
43	GTD	63	(United States) Scuderia Corsa	(Italy) Alessandro Balzan	1:27.867	+9.306	**21 (1)**
44	GTD	73	(United States) Park Place Motorsports	(France) Kévin Estre	1:27.963	+9.402	**22 (1)**
45	GTD	555	(Canada) AIM Autosport	(United States) Townsend Bell	1:28.234	+9.673	**23 (1)**
46	GTD	71	(United States) Park Place Motorsports	(United States) Craig Stanton	1:28.238	+9.677	**24 (1)**
47	GTD	27	(United States) Dempsey Racing	(United States) Andrew Davis	1:28.480	+9.919	**25 (1)**
48	GTD	007	(United States) TRG-AMR North America	(Australia) James Davison	1:29.051	+10.490	**26 (1)**
49	GTD	18	(Belgium) Mühlner Motorsports America	(Belgium) Nico Verdonck	1:29.581	+11.020	**27 (1)**
50	GTD	46	(United States) Fall-Line Motorsports	(United States) Charles Putman	1:29.634	+11.073	**28 (1)**
51	GTD	19	(Belgium) Mühlner Motorsports America	(United States) Mark Kvamme	1:30.205	+11.644	**29 (1)**
52	GTD	51	(Switzerland) Spirit of Race	(South Africa) Jack Gerber	1:34.022	+15.461	**30 (1)**
53	PC	7	(United States) Starworks Motorsport	No Time Established			**31 (1)**
54	PC	88	(United States) BAR1 Motorsports	No Time Established			**32 (1)**
55	GTLM	57	(United States) Krohn Racing	(United States) Tracy Krohn	No Time Established		22 (2)

Key	Meaning
**(1)**	Race One
**(2)**	Race Two

== Races ==
=== Race results ===
Class winners are denoted in bold and ‡. PC stands for Prototype Challenge and GTD (Grand Touring Daytona).

Pos	Class	No.	Team	Drivers	Chassis	Tire	Laps
Pos	Class	No.	Team	Drivers	Engine	Tire	Laps
1	**PC**	**8**	**(United States) Starworks Motorsport**	**(Germany) Mirco Schultis (Netherlands) Renger van der Zande**	**Oreca FLM09**	C	**82‡**
1	**PC**	**8**	**(United States) Starworks Motorsport**	**(Germany) Mirco Schultis (Netherlands) Renger van der Zande**	**Chevrolet 6.2 L V8**	C	**82‡**
2	PC	25	(United States) 8Star Motorsports	(Mexico) Luis Díaz (United States) Sean Rayhall	Oreca FLM09	C	82
2	PC	25	(United States) 8Star Motorsports	(Mexico) Luis Díaz (United States) Sean Rayhall	Chevrolet 6.2 L V8	C	82
3	PC	09	(United States) RSR Racing	(United States) Duncan Ende (Brazil) Bruno Junqueira	Oreca FLM09	C	82
3	PC	09	(United States) RSR Racing	(United States) Duncan Ende (Brazil) Bruno Junqueira	Chevrolet 6.2 L V8	C	82
4	PC	52	(United States) PR1/Mathiasen Motorsports	(United States) Gunnar Jeannette (United States) Frankie Montecalvo	Oreca FLM09	C	82
4	PC	52	(United States) PR1/Mathiasen Motorsports	(United States) Gunnar Jeannette (United States) Frankie Montecalvo	Chevrolet 6.2 L V8	C	82
5	PC	08	(United States) RSR Racing	(Canada) Chris Cumming (Canada) Alex Tagliani	Oreca FLM09	C	82
5	PC	08	(United States) RSR Racing	(Canada) Chris Cumming (Canada) Alex Tagliani	Chevrolet 6.2 L V8	C	82
6	PC	85	(United States) JDC-Miller MotorSports	(United States) Chris Miller (South Africa) Stephen Simpson	Oreca FLM09	C	81
6	PC	85	(United States) JDC-Miller MotorSports	(United States) Chris Miller (South Africa) Stephen Simpson	Chevrolet 6.2 L V8	C	81
7	PC	54	(United States) CORE Autosport	(United States) Jon Bennett (United States) Colin Braun	Oreca FLM09	C	78
7	PC	54	(United States) CORE Autosport	(United States) Jon Bennett (United States) Colin Braun	Chevrolet 6.2 L V8	C	78
8	**GTD**	**94**	**(United States) Turner Motorsport**	**(United States) Dane Cameron (Finland) Markus Palttala**	**BMW Z4 GT3**	C	**78‡**
8	**GTD**	**94**	**(United States) Turner Motorsport**	**(United States) Dane Cameron (Finland) Markus Palttala**	**BMW 4.4 L V8**	C	**78‡**
9	GTD	48	(United States) Paul Miller Racing	(Germany) Christopher Haase (United States) Bryce Miller	Audi R8 LMS ultra	C	78
9	GTD	48	(United States) Paul Miller Racing	(Germany) Christopher Haase (United States) Bryce Miller	Audi 5.2 L V10	C	78
10	GTD	44	(United States) Magnus Racing	(United States) Andy Lally (United States) John Potter	Porsche 911 GT America	C	78
10	GTD	44	(United States) Magnus Racing	(United States) Andy Lally (United States) John Potter	Porsche 4.0L Flat-6	C	78
11	GTD	22	(United States) Alex Job Racing	(United States) Leh Keen (United States) Cooper MacNeil	Porsche 911 GT America	C	78
11	GTD	22	(United States) Alex Job Racing	(United States) Leh Keen (United States) Cooper MacNeil	Porsche 4.0L Flat-6	C	78
12	GTD	35	(United States) Flying Lizard Motorsports	(South Africa) Dion von Moltke (United States) Seth Neiman	Audi R8 LMS ultra	C	78
12	GTD	35	(United States) Flying Lizard Motorsports	(South Africa) Dion von Moltke (United States) Seth Neiman	Audi 5.2 L V10	C	78
13 DNF	GTD	45	(United States) Flying Lizard Motorsports	(Venezuela) Nelson Canache Jr. (United States) Spencer Pumpelly	Audi R8 LMS ultra	C	77
13 DNF	GTD	45	(United States) Flying Lizard Motorsports	(Venezuela) Nelson Canache Jr. (United States) Spencer Pumpelly	Audi 5.2 L V10	C	77
14	GTD	63	(United States) Scuderia Corsa	(Italy) Alessandro Balzan (United States) Jeff Westphal	Ferrari 458 Italia GT3	C	77
14	GTD	63	(United States) Scuderia Corsa	(Italy) Alessandro Balzan (United States) Jeff Westphal	Ferrari 4.5L V8	C	77
15	GTD	23	(United States) Team Seattle/Alex Job Racing	(Germany) Mario Farnbacher (United Kingdom) Ian James	Porsche 911 GT America	C	77
15	GTD	23	(United States) Team Seattle/Alex Job Racing	(Germany) Mario Farnbacher (United Kingdom) Ian James	Porsche 4.0L Flat-6	C	77
16	GTD	73	(United States) Park Place Motorsports	(France) Kévin Estre (United States) Patrick Lindsey	Porsche 911 GT America	C	77
16	GTD	73	(United States) Park Place Motorsports	(France) Kévin Estre (United States) Patrick Lindsey	Porsche 4.0L Flat-6	C	77
17	GTD	64	(United States) Scuderia Corsa	(Sweden) Stefan Johansson (Canada) Kyle Marcelli	Ferrari 458 Italia GT3	C	77
17	GTD	64	(United States) Scuderia Corsa	(Sweden) Stefan Johansson (Canada) Kyle Marcelli	Ferrari 4.5L V8	C	77
18	GTD	58	(United States) Snow Racing	(Belgium) Jan Heylen (United States) Madison Snow	Porsche 911 GT America	C	77
18	GTD	58	(United States) Snow Racing	(Belgium) Jan Heylen (United States) Madison Snow	Porsche 4.0L Flat-6	C	77
19	GTD	30	(United States) NGT Motorsport	(Venezuela) Henrique Cisneros (Poland) Kuba Giermaziak	Porsche 911 GT America	C	77
19	GTD	30	(United States) NGT Motorsport	(Venezuela) Henrique Cisneros (Poland) Kuba Giermaziak	Porsche 4.0L Flat-6	C	77
20	GTD	007	(United States) TRG-AMR North America	(United States) Al Carter (Australia) James Davison	Aston Martin V12 Vantage GT3	C	77
20	GTD	007	(United States) TRG-AMR North America	(United States) Al Carter (Australia) James Davison	Aston Martin 6.0 L V12	C	77
21	GTD	555	(Canada) AIM Autosport	(United States) Townsend Bell (United States) Bill Sweedler	Ferrari 458 Italia GT3	C	77
21	GTD	555	(Canada) AIM Autosport	(United States) Townsend Bell (United States) Bill Sweedler	Ferrari 4.5L V8	C	77
22	GTD	71	(United States) Park Place Motorsports	(United States) Craig Stanton (United States) Jim Norman	Porsche 911 GT America	C	76
22	GTD	71	(United States) Park Place Motorsports	(United States) Craig Stanton (United States) Jim Norman	Porsche 4.0L Flat-6	C	76
23	GTD	33	(United States) Riley Motorsports	(Netherlands) Jeroen Bleekemolen (United States) Ben Keating	SRT Viper GT3-R	C	76
23	GTD	33	(United States) Riley Motorsports	(Netherlands) Jeroen Bleekemolen (United States) Ben Keating	SRT 8.0 L V10	C	76
24	GTD	81	(United States) GB Autosport	(United States) Bob Faieta (Republic of Ireland) Damien Faulkner	Porsche 911 GT America	C	76
24	GTD	81	(United States) GB Autosport	(United States) Bob Faieta (Republic of Ireland) Damien Faulkner	Porsche 4.0L Flat-6	C	76
25	GTD	18	(Belgium) Mühlner Motorsports America	(United States) Matt Bell (Australia) David Calvert-Jones	Porsche 911 GT America	C	76
25	GTD	18	(Belgium) Mühlner Motorsports America	(United States) Matt Bell (Australia) David Calvert-Jones	Porsche 4.0L Flat-6	C	76
26	GTD	51	(Switzerland) Spirit of Race	(Italy) Eddie Cheever III (South Africa) Jack Gerber	Ferrari 458 Italia GT3	C	75
26	GTD	51	(Switzerland) Spirit of Race	(Italy) Eddie Cheever III (South Africa) Jack Gerber	Ferrari 4.5L V8	C	75
27	GTD	27	(United States) Dempsey Racing	(United States) Andrew Davis (United States) Patrick Dempsey	Porsche 911 GT America	C	75
27	GTD	27	(United States) Dempsey Racing	(United States) Andrew Davis (United States) Patrick Dempsey	Porsche 4.0L Flat-6	C	75
28	GTD	19	(Belgium) Mühlner Motorsports America	(United States) Mark Kvamme (United States) Dillon Machavern	Porsche 911 GT America	C	69
28	GTD	19	(Belgium) Mühlner Motorsports America	(United States) Mark Kvamme (United States) Dillon Machavern	Porsche 4.0L Flat-6	C	69
29 DNF	PC	38	(United States) Performance Tech	(Canada) David Ostella (United States) Charlie Shears	Oreca FLM09	C	60
29 DNF	PC	38	(United States) Performance Tech	(Canada) David Ostella (United States) Charlie Shears	Chevrolet 6.2 L V8	C	60
30 DNF	PC	7	(United States) Starworks Motorsport	(United Kingdom) Sam Bird (Mexico) Martin Fuentes	Oreca FLM09	C	30
30 DNF	PC	7	(United States) Starworks Motorsport	(United Kingdom) Sam Bird (Mexico) Martin Fuentes	Chevrolet 6.2 L V8	C	30
31 DNF	GTD	46	(United States) Fall-Line Motorsports	(United States) Charles Espenlaub (United States) Charles Putman	Audi R8 LMS ultra	C	21
31 DNF	GTD	46	(United States) Fall-Line Motorsports	(United States) Charles Espenlaub (United States) Charles Putman	Audi 5.2 L V10	C	21
32 DNS	PC	88	(United States) BAR1 Motorsports	(United States) Doug Bielefeld (United States) Ryan Eversley	Oreca FLM09	C	--
32 DNS	PC	88	(United States) BAR1 Motorsports	(United States) Doug Bielefeld (United States) Ryan Eversley	Chevrolet 6.2 L V8	C	--

Tyre manufacturer
Key
Symbol	Tyre manufacturer
**C**	Continental

=== Race results ===
Class winners are denoted in bold and ‡. P stands for Prototype, and GTLM (Grand Touring Le Mans).

Pos	Class	No.	Team	Drivers	Chassis	Tire	Laps
Pos	Class	No.	Team	Drivers	Engine	Tire	Laps
1	**P**	**2**	**(United States) Extreme Speed Motorsports**	**(United States) Ed Brown (United States) Johannes van Overbeek**	**HPD ARX-03b**	C	**87‡**
1	**P**	**2**	**(United States) Extreme Speed Motorsports**	**(United States) Ed Brown (United States) Johannes van Overbeek**	**Honda HR28TT 2.8 L Turbo V6**	C	**87‡**
2	P	10	(United States) Wayne Taylor Racing	(United States) Jordan Taylor (United States) Ricky Taylor	Chevrolet Corvette DP	C	87
2	P	10	(United States) Wayne Taylor Racing	(United States) Jordan Taylor (United States) Ricky Taylor	Chevrolet LS9 5.5 L V8	C	87
3	P	01	(United States) Chip Ganassi Racing with Felix Sabates	(United States) Scott Pruett (Mexico) Memo Rojas	Riley MkXXVI	C	87
3	P	01	(United States) Chip Ganassi Racing with Felix Sabates	(United States) Scott Pruett (Mexico) Memo Rojas	Ford EcoBoost 3.5 L Turbo V6	C	87
4	P	5	(United States) Action Express Racing	(Portugal) João Barbosa (Brazil) Christian Fittipaldi	Chevrolet Corvette DP	C	87
4	P	5	(United States) Action Express Racing	(Portugal) João Barbosa (Brazil) Christian Fittipaldi	Chevrolet LS9 5.5 L V8	C	87
5	P	90	(United States) Spirit of Daytona Racing	(Canada) Michael Valiante (United Kingdom) Richard Westbrook	Chevrolet Corvette DP	C	87
5	P	90	(United States) Spirit of Daytona Racing	(Canada) Michael Valiante (United Kingdom) Richard Westbrook	Chevrolet LS9 5.5 L V8	C	87
6	P	31	(United States) Marsh Racing	(United States) Eric Curran (United States) Boris Said	Chevrolet Corvette DP	C	86
6	P	31	(United States) Marsh Racing	(United States) Eric Curran (United States) Boris Said	Chevrolet LS9 5.5 L V8	C	86
7	P	70	(United States) Speedsource	(United States) Tom Long (Canada) Sylvain Tremblay	Mazda Prototype	C	85
7	P	70	(United States) Speedsource	(United States) Tom Long (Canada) Sylvain Tremblay	Mazda Skyactiv-D 2.2 L Turbo I4 (Diesel)	C	85
8	**GTLM**	**3**	**(United States) Corvette Racing**	**(Spain) Antonio García (Denmark) Jan Magnussen**	**Chevrolet Corvette C7.R**	M	**84‡**
8	**GTLM**	**3**	**(United States) Corvette Racing**	**(Spain) Antonio García (Denmark) Jan Magnussen**	**Chevrolet LT5.5 5.5 L V8**	M	**84‡**
9	GTLM	55	(United States) BMW Team RLL	(United States) Bill Auberlen (United Kingdom) Andy Priaulx	BMW Z4 GTE	M	84
9	GTLM	55	(United States) BMW Team RLL	(United States) Bill Auberlen (United Kingdom) Andy Priaulx	BMW 4.4 L V8	M	84
10	GTLM	62	(United States) Risi Competizione	(Italy) Giancarlo Fisichella (Germany) Pierre Kaffer	Ferrari 458 Italia GT2	M	84
10	GTLM	62	(United States) Risi Competizione	(Italy) Giancarlo Fisichella (Germany) Pierre Kaffer	Ferrari 4.5 L V8	M	84
11	GTLM	17	(United States) Team Falken Tire	(Germany) Wolf Henzler (United States) Bryan Sellers	Porsche 911 RSR	F	84
11	GTLM	17	(United States) Team Falken Tire	(Germany) Wolf Henzler (United States) Bryan Sellers	Porsche 4.0 L Flat-6	F	84
12	GTLM	4	(United States) Corvette Racing	(United Kingdom) Oliver Gavin (United States) Tommy Milner	Chevrolet Corvette C7.R	M	84
12	GTLM	4	(United States) Corvette Racing	(United Kingdom) Oliver Gavin (United States) Tommy Milner	Chevrolet LT5.5 5.5 L V8	M	84
13	GTLM	91	(United States) SRT Motorsports	(Belgium) Marc Goossens (Germany) Dominik Farnbacher	SRT Viper GTS-R	M	84
13	GTLM	91	(United States) SRT Motorsports	(Belgium) Marc Goossens (Germany) Dominik Farnbacher	SRT 8.0 L V10	M	84
14	GTLM	93	(United States) SRT Motorsports	(United States) Jonathan Bomarito (Canada) Kuno Wittmer	SRT Viper GTS-R	M	84
14	GTLM	93	(United States) SRT Motorsports	(United States) Jonathan Bomarito (Canada) Kuno Wittmer	SRT 8.0 L V10	M	84
15	GTLM	912	(United States) Porsche North America	(Denmark) Michael Christensen (United States) Patrick Long	Porsche 911 RSR	M	83
15	GTLM	912	(United States) Porsche North America	(Denmark) Michael Christensen (United States) Patrick Long	Porsche 4.0 L Flat-6	M	83
16 (Note: The No. 911 Porsche North America entry was given a time penalty for failing to serve a stop + 60 penalty.)	GTLM	911	(United States) Porsche North America	(United Kingdom) Nick Tandy (Austria) Richard Lietz	Porsche 911 RSR	M	83
16	GTLM	911	(United States) Porsche North America	(United Kingdom) Nick Tandy (Austria) Richard Lietz	Porsche 4.0 L Flat-6	M	83
17	GTLM	56	(United States) BMW Team RLL	(United States) John Edwards (Germany) Dirk Müller	BMW Z4 GTE	M	83
17	GTLM	56	(United States) BMW Team RLL	(United States) John Edwards (Germany) Dirk Müller	BMW 4.4 L V8	M	83
18	GTLM	57	(United States) Krohn Racing	(Sweden) Niclas Jönsson (United States) Tracy Krohn	Ferrari 458 Italia GT2	M	82
18	GTLM	57	(United States) Krohn Racing	(Sweden) Niclas Jönsson (United States) Tracy Krohn	Ferrari 4.5 L V8	M	82
19	P	42	(France) OAK Racing	(United Kingdom) Alex Brundle (Colombia) Gustavo Yacamán	Morgan LMP2	C	73
19	P	42	(France) OAK Racing	(United Kingdom) Alex Brundle (Colombia) Gustavo Yacamán	Nissan VK45DE 4.5 L V8	C	73
20 DNF	P	0	(United States) DeltaWing Racing Cars	(United Kingdom) Katherine Legge (United Kingdom) Andy Meyrick	DeltaWing DWC13	C	66
20 DNF	P	0	(United States) DeltaWing Racing Cars	(United Kingdom) Katherine Legge (United Kingdom) Andy Meyrick	Élan (Mazda) 1.9 L I4 Turbo	C	66
21 DNF	P	60	(United States) Michael Shank Racing with Curb/Agajanian	(Brazil) Oswaldo Negri Jr. (United States) John Pew	Riley MkXXVI	C	65
21 DNF	P	60	(United States) Michael Shank Racing with Curb/Agajanian	(Brazil) Oswaldo Negri Jr. (United States) John Pew	Ford EcoBoost 3.5 L Turbo V6	C	65
22 DNF	P	1	(United States) Extreme Speed Motorsports	(United Kingdom) Ryan Dalziel (United States) Scott Sharp	HPD ARX-03b	C	45
22 DNF	P	1	(United States) Extreme Speed Motorsports	(United Kingdom) Ryan Dalziel (United States) Scott Sharp	Honda HR28TT 2.8 L Turbo V6	C	45
23 DNF	P	07	(United States) Speedsource	(United States) Joel Miller (United States) Tristan Nunez	Mazda Prototype	C	30
23 DNF	P	07	(United States) Speedsource	(United States) Joel Miller (United States) Tristan Nunez	Mazda Skyactiv-D 2.2 L Turbo I4 (Diesel)	C	30

Tyre manufacturers
Key
Symbol	Tyre manufacturer
**C**	Continental
**M**	Michelin
**F**	Falken Tire

United SportsCar Championship
Previous race: Tequila Patrón Sports Car Showcase	2014 season	Next race: Chevrolet Sports Car Classic
