= 2014 Brickyard Grand Prix =

Auto race in Indianapolis

Track map of Indianapolis Motor Speedway Road Course

The 2014 Brickyard Grand Prix was a sports car race sanctioned by the International Motor Sports Association (IMSA) held on the Indianapolis Motor Speedway in Speedway, Indiana on July 25, 2014. The event served as the ninth of thirteen scheduled rounds of the 2014 United SportsCar Championship.

== Background ==
=== Preview ===
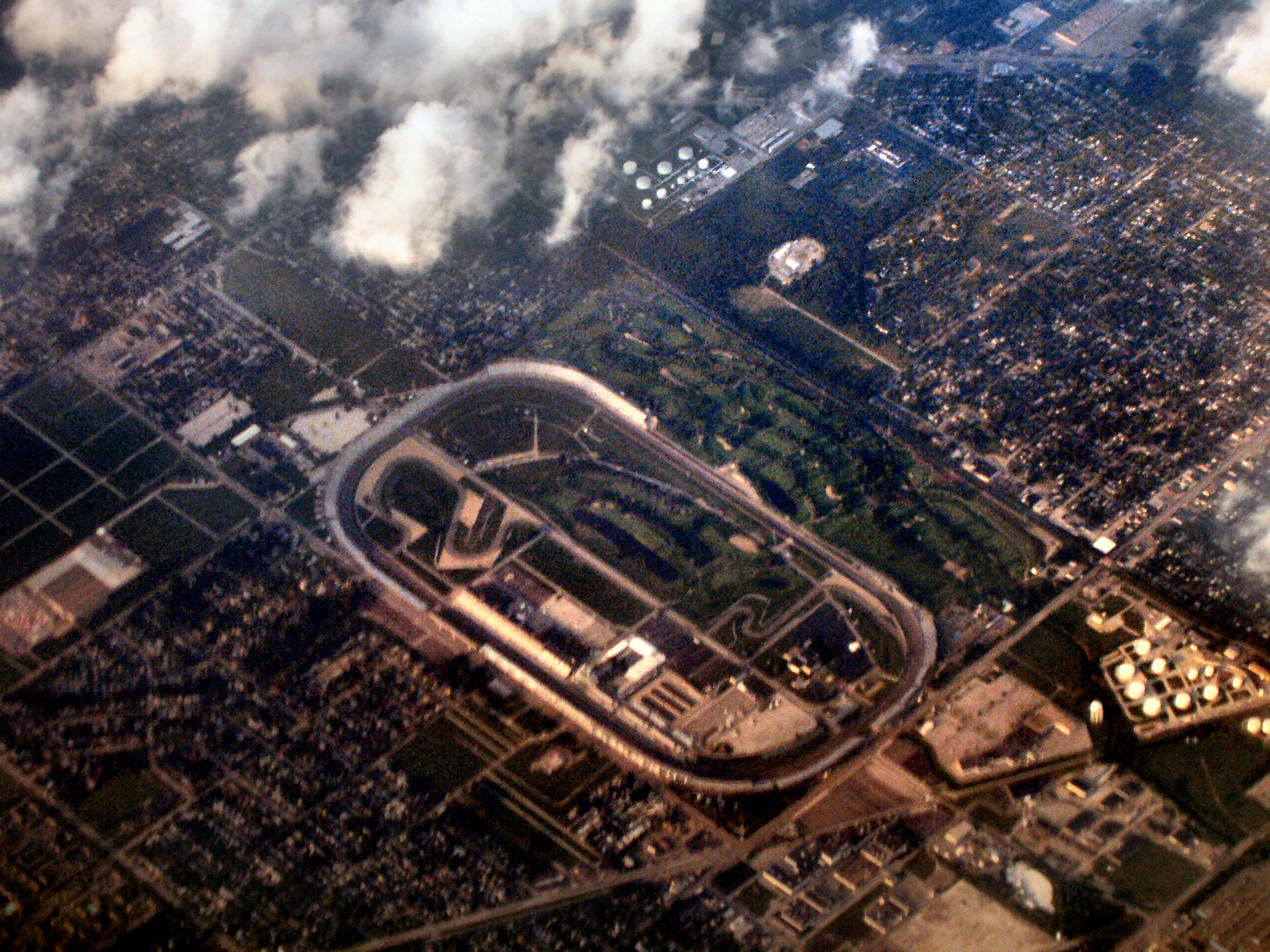
Indianapolis Motor Speedway, the track where the race was held.

International Motor Sports Association (IMSA) president Scott Atherton confirmed that the race was part of the 2014 United SportsCar Championship schedule in October 2013. It was the first year the event was held as part of the Tudor United SportsCar Championship. The 2014 Brickyard Grand Prix was the ninth of thirteen scheduled sports car races of 2014 by IMSA, and it was the sixth round not held as part of the North American Endurance Cup. The event was held at the fourteen-turn 2.439 mi (3.925 km) Indianapolis Motor Speedway in Speedway, Indiana on July 25, 2014.

Before the race, Jordan Taylor and Ricky Taylor led the Prototype Drivers' Championship with 218 points, 5 points clear of João Barbosa and Christian Fittipaldi in second, and Gustavo Yacamán with 208 points. With 169 points, PC was led by Jon Bennett and Colin Braun with a seventeen-point advantage over Renger van der Zande. In GTLM, the Drivers' Championship was led by Antonio García and Jan Magnussen with 190 points; the duo held a nineteen-point gap over Bill Auberlen and Andy Priaulx. Bill Sweedler and Townsend Bell led the GTD Drivers' Championship with 164 points, 3 points ahead of Andy Lally and John Potter. Chevrolet and Ferrari were leading their respective Manufacturers' Championships, while Wayne Taylor Racing, CORE Autosport, Corvette Racing, and AIM Autosport were their respective Teams' Championships.

=== Entry list ===
Forty-nine cars were officially entered for the Brickyard Grand Prix, with the bulk of entries in the Prototype (P) and Grand Touring Daytona (GTD) classes. Action Express Racing (AER), Marsh Racing, VisitFlorida Racing (VFR) and Wayne Taylor Racing (WTR) entered one Chevrolet Corvette DP. Chip Ganassi Racing (CGR) and Michael Shank Racing (MSR) entered one Ford-powered Riley MkXXVI. Speedsource had two Lola B12/80 while Extreme Speed Motorsports (ESM) entered two HPD ARX-03b cars and OAK Racing entered one Morgan LMP2 chassis with Nissan VK45DE 4.5 L V8 engine. The DeltaWing car withdrew from the event due to damage. The Prototype Challenge (PC) class was composed of ten Oreca FLM09 cars: two from Starworks Motorsport and RSR Racing. BAR1 Motorsports, CORE Autosport, JDC-Miller MotorSports, Performance Tech, PR1/Mathiasen Motorsports, and 8Star Motorsports entered one car each. GTLM was represented by ten entries from five different brands. In the list of GTD entrants, eighteen GT-specification vehicles were represented by six different manufacturers.

== Practice ==
There were two practice sessions preceding the start of the race on Friday, both on Thursday. The first session on Thursday morning lasted 90 minutes while the second on Thursday afternoon lasted an hour.

== Qualifying ==
Thursday afternoon's 80-minute four-group qualifying session gave 15-minute sessions to all categories. Cars in GTD were sent out first before those grouped in GTLM, PC, and Prototype had three separate identically timed sessions. Regulations stipulated teams to nominate one qualifying driver, with the fastest laps determining each classes starting order. IMSA would arranged the grid to put all Prototypes ahead of the PC, GTLM, and GTD cars.

=== Qualifying results ===
Pole positions in each class are indicated in bold and by ‡. P stands for Prototype, PC (Prototype Challenge), GTLM (Grand Touring Le Mans) and GTD (Grand Touring Daytona).

Pos.	Class	No.	Team	Driver	Time	Gap	Grid
1	**P**	**1**	**(United States) Extreme Speed Motorsports**	**(United Kingdom) Ryan Dalziel**	**1:17.603**	_	1‡
2	P	2	(United States) Extreme Speed Motorsports	(United States) Johannes van Overbeek	1:17.879	+0.276	2
3	P	42	(France) OAK Racing	(Colombia) Gustavo Yacamán	1:17.908	+0.305	3
4	P	5	(United States) Action Express Racing	(Brazil) Christian Fittipaldi	1:18.102	+0.499	4
5	P	90	(United States) Spirit of Daytona Racing	(United Kingdom) Richard Westbrook	1:18.188	+0.585	5
6	P	01	(United States) Chip Ganassi Racing with Felix Sabates	(United States) Scott Pruett	1:18.436	+0.833	6
7	P	10	(United States) Wayne Taylor Racing	(United States) Jordan Taylor	1:18.592	+0.989	7
8	P	60	(United States) Michael Shank Racing with Curb/Agajanian	(Brazil) Oswaldo Negri Jr.	1:19.555	+1.952	8
9	P	31	(United States) Marsh Racing	(United States) Eric Curran	1:19.714	+2.111	9
10	**PC**	**54**	**(United States) CORE Autosport**	**(United States) Colin Braun**	**1:19.849**	**+2.246**	10‡
11	PC	09	(United States) RSR Racing	(Brazil) Bruno Junqueira	1:20.076	+2.473	11
12	PC	25	(United States) 8Star Motorsports	(Mexico) Luis Díaz	1:20.111	+2.508	12
13	PC	38	(United States) Performance Tech	(Canada) David Ostella	1:20.208	+2.605	13
14	PC	88	(United States) BAR1 Motorsports	(United Kingdom) Martin Plowman	1:20.259	+2.656	14
15	PC	52	(United States) PR1/Mathiasen Motorsports	(United States) Gunnar Jeannette	1:20.417	+2.814	15
16	PC	8	(United States) Starworks Motorsport	(Netherlands) Renger van der Zande	1:20.582	+2.951	16
17	PC	08	(United States) RSR Racing	(United Kingdom) Jack Hawksworth	1:20.582	+2.979	17
18	PC	7	(United States) Starworks Motorsport	(Australia) John Martin	1:20.665	+3.052	18
19	PC	85	(United States) JDC-Miller MotorSports	(South Africa) Stephen Simpson	1:21.176	+3.573	19
20	P	07	(United States) Speedsource	(United States) Tristan Nunez	1:21.384	+3.781	20
21	P	70	(United States) Speedsource	(Canada) Sylvain Tremblay	1:22.057	+4.454	21
22	**GTLM**	**62**	**(United States) Risi Competizione**	**(Italy) Giancarlo Fisichella**	**1:22.378**	**+4.775**	22‡
23	GTLM	56	(United States) BMW Team RLL	(United States) John Edwards	1:22.442	+4.839	23
24	GTLM	93	(United States) SRT Motorsports	(United States) Jonathan Bomarito	1:22.491	+4.888	24
25	GTLM	91	(United States) SRT Motorsports	(Belgium) Marc Goossens	1:22.503	+4.900	25
26	GTLM	55	(United States) BMW Team RLL	(United States) Bill Auberlen	1:22.563	+4.960	26
27	GTLM	3	(United States) Corvette Racing	(Spain) Antonio García	1:22.593	+4.990	27
28	GTLM	17	(United States) Team Falken Tire	(United States) Bryan Sellers	1:22.730	+5.127	28
29	GTLM	912	(United States) Porsche North America	(Denmark) Michael Christensen	1:22.938	+5.335	29
30	GTLM	911	(United States) Porsche North America	(United Kingdom) Nick Tandy	1:23.101	+5.498	30
31	GTLM	4	(United States) Corvette Racing	(United States) Tommy Milner	1:23.237	+5.634	31
32	**GTD**	**94**	**(United States) Turner Motorsport**	**(United States) Dane Cameron**	**1:26.058**	**+8.455**	32‡
33	GTD	33	(United States) Riley Motorsports	(Netherlands) Jeroen Bleekemolen	1:26.220	+8.546	33
34	GTD	555	(Canada) AIM Autosport	(United States) Townsend Bell	1:26.220	+8.617	34
35	GTD	45	(United States) Flying Lizard Motorsports	(United States) Spencer Pumpelly	1:26.246	+8.643	35
36	GTD	23	(United States) Team Seattle/Alex Job Racing	(Germany) Mario Farnbacher	1:26.271	+8.668	36
37	GTD	007	(United States) TRG-AMR North America	(Australia) James Davison	1:26.336	+8.733	37
38	GTD	58	(United States) Snow Racing	(Belgium) Jan Heylen	1:26.340	+8.737	38
39	GTD	48	(United States) Paul Miller Racing	(Germany) Christopher Haase	1:26.519	+8.916	39
40	GTD	63	(United States) Scuderia Corsa	(Italy) Alessandro Balzan	1:26.742	+9.139	40
41	GTD	22	(United States) Alex Job Racing	(United States) Leh Keen	1:26.767	+9.164	41
42	GTD	81	(United States) GB Autosport	(Republic of Ireland) Damien Faulkner	1:26.813	+9.260	42
43	GTD	46	(United States) Fall-Line Motorsports	(United States) Charles Espenlaub	1:27.010	+9.407	43
44	GTD	44	(United States) Magnus Racing	(United States) Andy Lally	1:27.106	+9.503	44
45	GTD	27	(United States) Dempsey Racing	(United States) Andrew Davis	1:27.224	+9.621	45
46	GTD	73	(United States) Park Place Motorsports	(United States) Mike Skeen	1:27.319	+9.716	46
47	GTD	35	(United States) Flying Lizard Motorsports	(South Africa) Dion von Moltke	1:27.406	+9.803	47
48	GTD	19	(Belgium) Mühlner Motorsports America	(United States) Mark Kvamme	1:27.830	+10.227	48
49	GTD	18	(Belgium) Mühlner Motorsports America	None	No Time Established		49

== Race ==
=== Race results ===
Class winners are denoted in bold and ‡. P stands for Prototype, PC (Prototype Challenge), GTLM (Grand Touring Le Mans) and GTD (Grand Touring Daytona).

Pos	Class	No.	Team	Drivers	Chassis	Tire	Laps
Pos	Class	No.	Team	Drivers	Engine	Tire	Laps
1	**P**	**5**	**(United States) Action Express Racing**	**(Portugal) João Barbosa (Brazil) Christian Fittipaldi**	**Chevrolet Corvette DP**	C	**108‡**
1	**P**	**5**	**(United States) Action Express Racing**	**(Portugal) João Barbosa (Brazil) Christian Fittipaldi**	**Chevrolet LS9 5.5 L V8**	C	**108‡**
2	P	01	(United States) Chip Ganassi Racing with Felix Sabates	(United States) Scott Pruett (Mexico) Memo Rojas (United States) Sage Karam	Riley MkXXVI	C	108
2	P	01	(United States) Chip Ganassi Racing with Felix Sabates	(United States) Scott Pruett (Mexico) Memo Rojas (United States) Sage Karam	Ford EcoBoost 3.5 L Turbo V6	C	108
3	P	90	(United States) Spirit of Daytona Racing	(Canada) Michael Valiante (United Kingdom) Richard Westbrook	Chevrolet Corvette DP	C	108
3	P	90	(United States) Spirit of Daytona Racing	(Canada) Michael Valiante (United Kingdom) Richard Westbrook	Chevrolet LS9 5.5 L V8	C	108
4	P	10	(United States) Wayne Taylor Racing	(United States) Ricky Taylor (United States) Jordan Taylor	Chevrolet Corvette DP	C	108
4	P	10	(United States) Wayne Taylor Racing	(United States) Ricky Taylor (United States) Jordan Taylor	Chevrolet LS9 5.5 L V8	C	108
5	P	1	(United States) Extreme Speed Motorsports	(United States) Scott Sharp (United Kingdom) Ryan Dalziel	HPD ARX-03b	C	108
5	P	1	(United States) Extreme Speed Motorsports	(United States) Scott Sharp (United Kingdom) Ryan Dalziel	Honda HR28TT 2.8 L Turbo V6	C	108
6	P	60	(United States) Michael Shank Racing with Curb/Agajanian	(United States) John Pew (Brazil) Oswaldo Negri	Riley MkXXVI	C	107
6	P	60	(United States) Michael Shank Racing with Curb/Agajanian	(United States) John Pew (Brazil) Oswaldo Negri	Ford EcoBoost 3.5 L Turbo V6	C	107
7	P	2	(United States) Extreme Speed Motorsports	(United States) Ed Brown (United States) Johannes van Overbeek	HPD ARX-03b	C	107
7	P	2	(United States) Extreme Speed Motorsports	(United States) Ed Brown (United States) Johannes van Overbeek	Honda HR28TT 2.8 L Turbo V6	C	107
8	P	42	(France) OAK Racing	(China) Ho-Pin Tung (Colombia) Gustavo Yacamán	Morgan LMP2	C	107
8	P	42	(France) OAK Racing	(China) Ho-Pin Tung (Colombia) Gustavo Yacamán	Nissan VK45DE 4.5 L V8	C	107
9	**PC**	**08**	**(United States) RSR Racing**	**(Canada) Chris Cumming (United Kingdom) Jack Hawksworth**	**Oreca FLM09**	C	**107‡**
9	**PC**	**08**	**(United States) RSR Racing**	**(Canada) Chris Cumming (United Kingdom) Jack Hawksworth**	**Chevrolet 6.2 L V8**	C	**107‡**
10	PC	09	(United States) RSR Racing	(United States) Duncan Ende (Brazil) Bruno Junqueira	Oreca FLM09	C	107
10	PC	09	(United States) RSR Racing	(United States) Duncan Ende (Brazil) Bruno Junqueira	Chevrolet 6.2 L V8	C	107
11	PC	54	(United States) CORE Autosport	(United States) Jon Bennett (United States) Colin Braun	Oreca FLM09	C	107
11	PC	54	(United States) CORE Autosport	(United States) Jon Bennett (United States) Colin Braun	Chevrolet 6.2 L V8	C	107
12	PC	38	(United States) Performance Tech	(Canada) David Ostella (United States) James French	Oreca FLM09	C	107
12	PC	38	(United States) Performance Tech	(Canada) David Ostella (United States) James French	Chevrolet 6.2 L V8	C	107
13	P	07	(United States) Speedsource	(United States) Joel Miller (United States) Tristan Nunez	Mazda Prototype	C	106
13	P	07	(United States) Speedsource	(United States) Joel Miller (United States) Tristan Nunez	Mazda Skyactiv-D 2.2 L Turbo I4 (Diesel)	C	106
14	**GTLM**	**93**	**(United States) SRT Motorsports**	**(United States) Jonathan Bomarito (Canada) Kuno Wittmer**	**SRT Viper GTS-R**	MI	**105‡**
14	**GTLM**	**93**	**(United States) SRT Motorsports**	**(United States) Jonathan Bomarito (Canada) Kuno Wittmer**	**SRT 8.0 L V10**	MI	**105‡**
15	p	70	(United States) Speedsource	(United States) Tom Long (Canada) Sylvain Tremblay	Mazda Prototype	C	105
15	p	70	(United States) Speedsource	(United States) Tom Long (Canada) Sylvain Tremblay	Mazda Skyactiv-D 2.2 L Turbo I4 (Diesel)	C	105
16	GTLM	62	(United States) Risi Competizione	(Italy) Giancarlo Fisichella (Germany) Pierre Kaffer	Ferrari 458 Italia GT2	MI	105
16	GTLM	62	(United States) Risi Competizione	(Italy) Giancarlo Fisichella (Germany) Pierre Kaffer	Ferrari 4.5 L V8	MI	105
17	GTLM	912	(United States) Porsche North America	(United States) Patrick Long (Denmark) Michael Christensen	Porsche 911 RSR	MI	105
17	GTLM	912	(United States) Porsche North America	(United States) Patrick Long (Denmark) Michael Christensen	Porsche 4.0 L Flat-6	MI	105
18	GTLM	3	(United States) Corvette Racing	(Spain) Antonio García (Denmark) Jan Magnussen	Chevrolet Corvette C7.R	MI	105
18	GTLM	3	(United States) Corvette Racing	(Spain) Antonio García (Denmark) Jan Magnussen	Chevrolet LT5.5 5.5 L V8	MI	105
19	GTLM	4	(United States) Corvette Racing	(United Kingdom) Oliver Gavin (United States) Tommy Milner	Chevrolet Corvette C7.R	MI	105
19	GTLM	4	(United States) Corvette Racing	(United Kingdom) Oliver Gavin (United States) Tommy Milner	Chevrolet LT5.5 5.5 L V8	MI	105
20	GTLM	55	(United States) BMW Team RLL	(United States) Bill Auberlen (United Kingdom) Andy Priaulx	BMW Z4 GTE	MI	105
20	GTLM	55	(United States) BMW Team RLL	(United States) Bill Auberlen (United Kingdom) Andy Priaulx	BMW 4.4 L V8	MI	105
21	GTLM	56	(United States) BMW Team RLL	(United States) John Edwards (Germany) Dirk Müller	BMW Z4 GTE	MI	105
21	GTLM	56	(United States) BMW Team RLL	(United States) John Edwards (Germany) Dirk Müller	BMW 4.4 L V8	MI	105
22	PC	52	(United States) PR1/Mathiasen Motorsports	(United States) Gunnar Jeannette (United States) Frankie Montecalvo	Oreca FLM09	C	105
22	PC	52	(United States) PR1/Mathiasen Motorsports	(United States) Gunnar Jeannette (United States) Frankie Montecalvo	Chevrolet 6.2 L V8	C	105
23	PC	25	(United States) 8Star Motorsports	(Mexico) Luis Díaz (United States) Sean Rayhall	Oreca FLM09	C	104
23	PC	25	(United States) 8Star Motorsports	(Mexico) Luis Díaz (United States) Sean Rayhall	Chevrolet 6.2 L V8	C	104
24	GTLM	91	(United States) SRT Motorsports	(Belgium) Marc Goossens (Germany) Dominik Farnbacher	SRT Viper GTS-R	MI	103
24	GTLM	91	(United States) SRT Motorsports	(Belgium) Marc Goossens (Germany) Dominik Farnbacher	SRT 8.0 L V10	MI	103
25	**GTD**	**63**	**(United States) Scuderia Corsa**	**(Italy) Alessandro Balzan (United States) Jeff Westphal**	**Ferrari 458 Italia GT3**	C	**102‡**
25	**GTD**	**63**	**(United States) Scuderia Corsa**	**(Italy) Alessandro Balzan (United States) Jeff Westphal**	**Ferrari 4.5L V8**	C	**102‡**
26	GTD	48	(United States) Paul Miller Racing	(Germany) Christopher Haase (United States) Bryce Miller	Audi R8 LMS ultra	C	101
26	GTD	48	(United States) Paul Miller Racing	(Germany) Christopher Haase (United States) Bryce Miller	Audi 5.2 L V10	C	101
27	GTD	33	(United States) Riley Motorsports	(Netherlands) Jeroen Bleekemolen (United States) Ben Keating	SRT Viper GT3-R	C	101
27	GTD	33	(United States) Riley Motorsports	(Netherlands) Jeroen Bleekemolen (United States) Ben Keating	SRT 8.0 L V10	C	101
28	GTLM	17	(United States) Team Falken Tire	(Germany) Wolf Henzler (United States) Bryan Sellers	Porsche 911 RSR	FAL	101
28	GTLM	17	(United States) Team Falken Tire	(Germany) Wolf Henzler (United States) Bryan Sellers	Porsche 4.0 L Flat-6	FAL	101
29	GTD	555	(Canada) AIM Autosport	(United States) Townsend Bell (United States) Bill Sweedler	Ferrari 458 Italia GT3	C	101
29	GTD	555	(Canada) AIM Autosport	(United States) Townsend Bell (United States) Bill Sweedler	Ferrari 4.5L V8	C	101
30	GTD	22	(United States) Alex Job Racing	(United States) Leh Keen (United States) Cooper MacNeil	Porsche 911 GT America	C	101
30	GTD	22	(United States) Alex Job Racing	(United States) Leh Keen (United States) Cooper MacNeil	Porsche 4.0L Flat-6	C	101
31	GTD	23	(United States) Team Seattle/Alex Job Racing	(Germany) Mario Farnbacher (United Kingdom) Ian James	Porsche 911 GT America	C	101
31	GTD	23	(United States) Team Seattle/Alex Job Racing	(Germany) Mario Farnbacher (United Kingdom) Ian James	Porsche 4.0L Flat-6	C	101
32	GTD	007	(United States) TRG-AMR North America	(United States) Al Carter (Australia) James Davison	Aston Martin V12 Vantage GT3	C	101
32	GTD	007	(United States) TRG-AMR North America	(United States) Al Carter (Australia) James Davison	Aston Martin 6.0 L V12	C	101
33	GTD	45	(United States) Flying Lizard Motorsports	(Venezuela) Nelson Canache Jr. (United States) Spencer Pumpelly	Audi R8 LMS ultra	C	101
33	GTD	45	(United States) Flying Lizard Motorsports	(Venezuela) Nelson Canache Jr. (United States) Spencer Pumpelly	Audi 5.2 L V10	C	101
34	GTD	27	(United States) Dempsey Racing	(United States) Andrew Davis (United States) Patrick Dempsey	Porsche 911 GT America	C	101
34	GTD	27	(United States) Dempsey Racing	(United States) Andrew Davis (United States) Patrick Dempsey	Porsche 4.0L Flat-6	C	101
35	GTD	73	(United States) Park Place Motorsports	(United States) Patrick Lindsey (United States) Mike Skeen	Porsche 911 GT America		101
35	GTD	73	(United States) Park Place Motorsports	(United States) Patrick Lindsey (United States) Mike Skeen	Porsche 4.0L Flat-6		101
36	GTD	58	(United States) Snow Racing	(Belgium) Jan Heylen (United States) Madison Snow	Porsche 911 GT America	C	101
36	GTD	58	(United States) Snow Racing	(Belgium) Jan Heylen (United States) Madison Snow	Porsche 4.0L Flat-6	C	101
37	GTD	44	(United States) Magnus Racing	(United States) Andy Lally (United States) John Potter	Porsche 911 GT America	C	101
37	GTD	44	(United States) Magnus Racing	(United States) Andy Lally (United States) John Potter	Porsche 4.0L Flat-6	C	101
38	GTD	35	(United States) Flying Lizard Motorsports	(South Africa) Dion von Moltke (United States) Seth Neiman (United States) Spencer Pumpelly	Audi R8 LMS ultra	C	98
38	GTD	35	(United States) Flying Lizard Motorsports	(South Africa) Dion von Moltke (United States) Seth Neiman (United States) Spencer Pumpelly	Audi 5.2 L V10	C	98
39	GTD	46	(United States) Fall-Line Motorsports	(United States) Charles Espenlaub (United States) Charles Putman	Audi R8 LMS ultra	C	98
39	GTD	46	(United States) Fall-Line Motorsports	(United States) Charles Espenlaub (United States) Charles Putman	Audi 5.2 L V10	C	98
40	GTD	94	(United States) Turner Motorsport	(United States) Dane Cameron (Canada) Paul Dalla Lana	BMW Z4 GT3	C	96
40	GTD	94	(United States) Turner Motorsport	(United States) Dane Cameron (Canada) Paul Dalla Lana	BMW 4.4 L V8	C	96
41	PC	85	(United States) JDC-Miller MotorSports	(United States) Chris Miller (South Africa) Stephen Simpson	Oreca FLM09	C	93
41	PC	85	(United States) JDC-Miller MotorSports	(United States) Chris Miller (South Africa) Stephen Simpson	Chevrolet 6.2 L V8	C	93
42 DNF	PC	7	(United States) Starworks Motorsport	(Australia) John Martin (Mexico) Martin Fuentes	Oreca FLM09	C	91
42 DNF	PC	7	(United States) Starworks Motorsport	(Australia) John Martin (Mexico) Martin Fuentes	Chevrolet 6.2 L V8	C	91
43	GTD	81	(United States) GB Autosport	(United States) Bob Faieta (Republic of Ireland) Damien Faulkner	Porsche 911 GT America	C	85
43	GTD	81	(United States) GB Autosport	(United States) Bob Faieta (Republic of Ireland) Damien Faulkner	Porsche 4.0L Flat-6	C	85
44 DNF	GTLM	911	(United States) Porsche North America	(United Kingdom) Nick Tandy (Austria) Richard Lietz	Porsche 911 RSR	MI	65
44 DNF	GTLM	911	(United States) Porsche North America	(United Kingdom) Nick Tandy (Austria) Richard Lietz	Porsche 4.0 L Flat-6	MI	65
45 DNF	PC	88	(United States) BAR1 Motorsports	(United States) Doug Bielefeld (United Kingdom) Martin Plowman	Oreca FLM09	C	34
45 DNF	PC	88	(United States) BAR1 Motorsports	(United States) Doug Bielefeld (United Kingdom) Martin Plowman	Chevrolet 6.2 L V8	C	34
46 DNF	PC	8	(United States) Starworks Motorsport	(Germany) Mirco Schultis (Netherlands) Renger van der Zande	Oreca FLM09	C	21
46 DNF	PC	8	(United States) Starworks Motorsport	(Germany) Mirco Schultis (Netherlands) Renger van der Zande	Chevrolet 6.2 L V8	C	21
47 DNF	GTD	19	(Belgium) Mühlner Motorsports America	(United States) Mark Kvamme (United States) Randy Pobst	Porsche 911 GT America	C	19
47 DNF	GTD	19	(Belgium) Mühlner Motorsports America	(United States) Mark Kvamme (United States) Randy Pobst	Porsche 4.0L Flat-6	C	19
48 DNF	P	31	(United States) Marsh Racing	(United States) Eric Curran (United States) Burt Frisselle	Chevrolet Corvette DP	C	13
48 DNF	P	31	(United States) Marsh Racing	(United States) Eric Curran (United States) Burt Frisselle	Chevrolet LS9 5.5 L V8	C	13
49 DNS	GTD	18	(Belgium) Mühlner Motorsports America	(United States) Mark Kvamme (United States) Randy Pobst	Porsche 911 GT America	C	--
49 DNS	GTD	18	(Belgium) Mühlner Motorsports America	(United States) Mark Kvamme (United States) Randy Pobst	Porsche 4.0L Flat-6	C	--

Tyre manufacturers
Key
Symbol	Tyre manufacturer
**C**	Continental
**MI**	Michelin
**FAL**	Falken Tire

United SportsCar Championship
Previous race: SportsCar Grand Prix	2014 season	Next race: Continental Tire Road Race Showcase
