= GreenGT H2 =

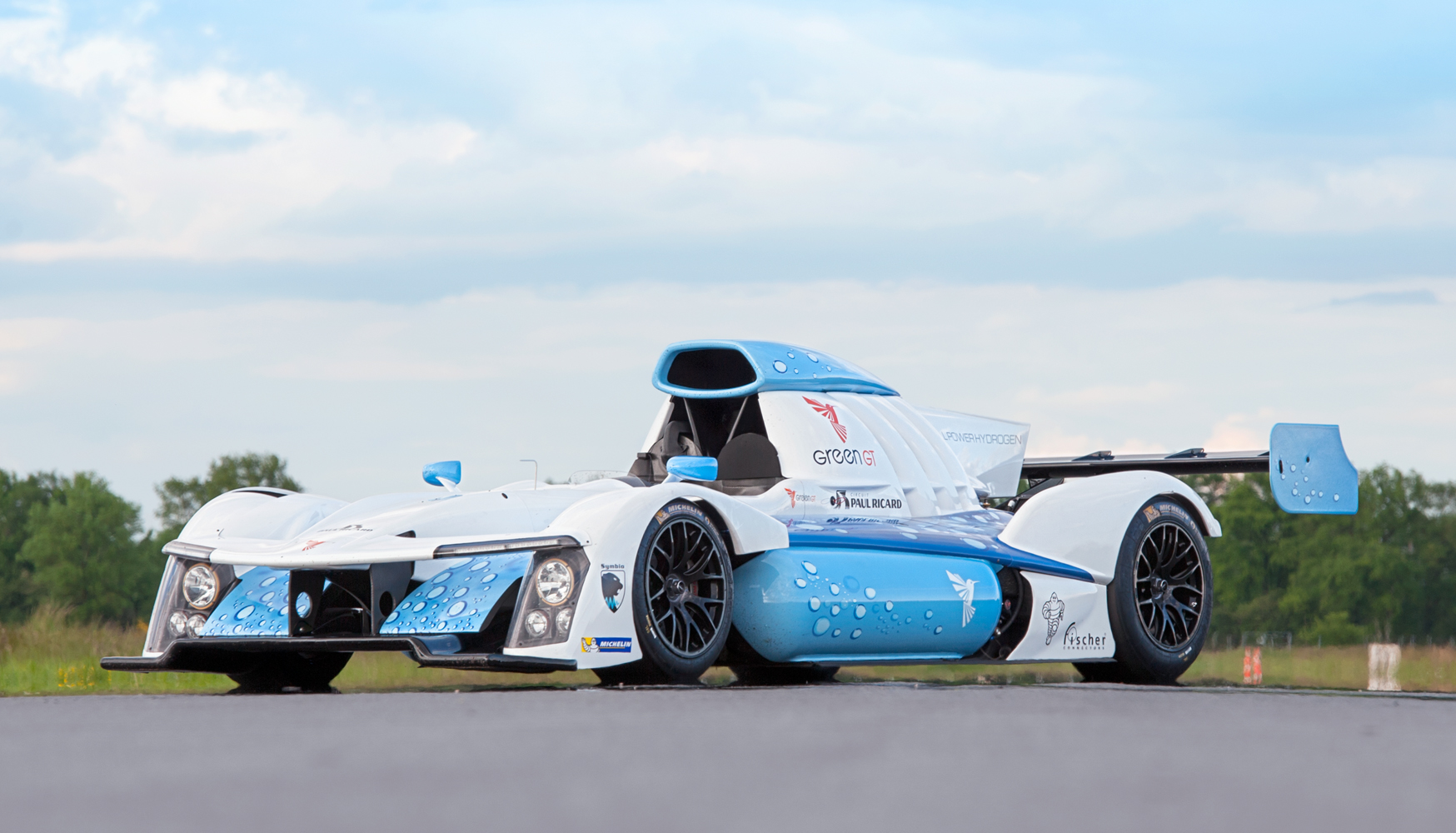
- GreenGT H2 in 2016

Overview
- Manufacturer: GreenGT
- Production: 2009

Body and chassis
- Class: Racing car
- Layout: Rear mid-engine, rear-wheel-drive layout

Powertrain
- Electric motor: Fuel cell-powered 540 hp (400 kW; 550 PS)
- Transmission: 1-speed

Dimensions
- Length: 4,950 mm (194.9 in)
- Width: 2,000 mm (78.7 in)
- Height: 1,200 mm (47.2 in)
- Curb weight: 1,240 kg (2,730 lb)

The GreenGT H2 is a sports racing car developed by the Swiss company GreenGT and the French racing team WELTER Racing. It uses hydrogen as an energy source.

== History ==
The origin of the H2 dates back to 2009 after the construction of a first prototype of electric competition called GreenGT 300 kW and powered by lithium/ion batteries. The autonomy of the latter having quickly proved to be a defect of the 300 kW, GreenGT decided to use a fuel cell to provide additional energy necessary for electric motors. Its goal is to design a car without combustion, releasing only water vapor into the atmosphere. On 22 September 2011, the life-size model of the H2 passed through the wind tunnel for the first time, in France, at the IAT (Aerotechnical Institute) of Saint-Cyr-l'École. The H2 was presented on 2 June 2012 as part of the 24 Hours of Le Mans test day. It was also invited to participate outside the classification in the 2013 24 Hours of Le Mans and to occupy stand no. 56 reserved for technologically innovative cars. However, the development phase of the high-power electric-hydrogen generator, which is particularly complex, encroaches on the program of on-track endurance tests essential to the preparation of a race as demanding as the classic Mancelle.

On June 27, 2015, the H2 made its world premiere on the Circuit Paul Ricard as part of the French round of the World Touring Car Championship. On 24 and 25 May 2016, on the Circuit de Lurcy-Lévis (Allier), the H2 carried out a final validation driving session in the hands of GreenGT development driver Olivier Lombard, with a view to a demonstration planned in the framework of the 2016 24 Hours of Le Mans with Olivier Panis. During the race weekend, on 16 June, it became the first car powered by an electric-hydrogen powertrain to complete a lap of Circuit de la Sarthe. Still driven by Panis, it repeated its demonstration two days later at the start of the race.
