= Perrinn Cars =

Perrinn Engineering
- Industry: Automotive
- Founded: 2011
- Founder: Nicolas Perrinn
- Headquarters: United Kingdom
- Products: racing cars, Sports cars

Perrinn Cars is a British specialist builder of racing and sports cars. The company was founded by engineer Nicolas Perrinn in 2011. They designed an LMP1 car in 2014 planned to be in use for the 2015 FIA World Endurance Championship, but the project was put on standby. On 18 May 2017, it was announced that Perrinn would continue their LMP1 project for the 2018 season. Perrinn has made three cars thus far, two of which have been purchased by a team whose identity is as yet unknown. The third car acts as a spare for Perrinn.
