= 2014 Continental Tire Road Race Showcase =

Sports Car race

Track map of Road America

The 2014 Continental Tire Road Race Showcase was a sports car race sanctioned by the International Motor Sports Association (IMSA) held at Road America in Elkhart Lake, Wisconsin on August 10, 2014. The event served as the tenth of thirteen scheduled rounds of the 2014 United SportsCar Championship.

== Background ==
=== Preview ===
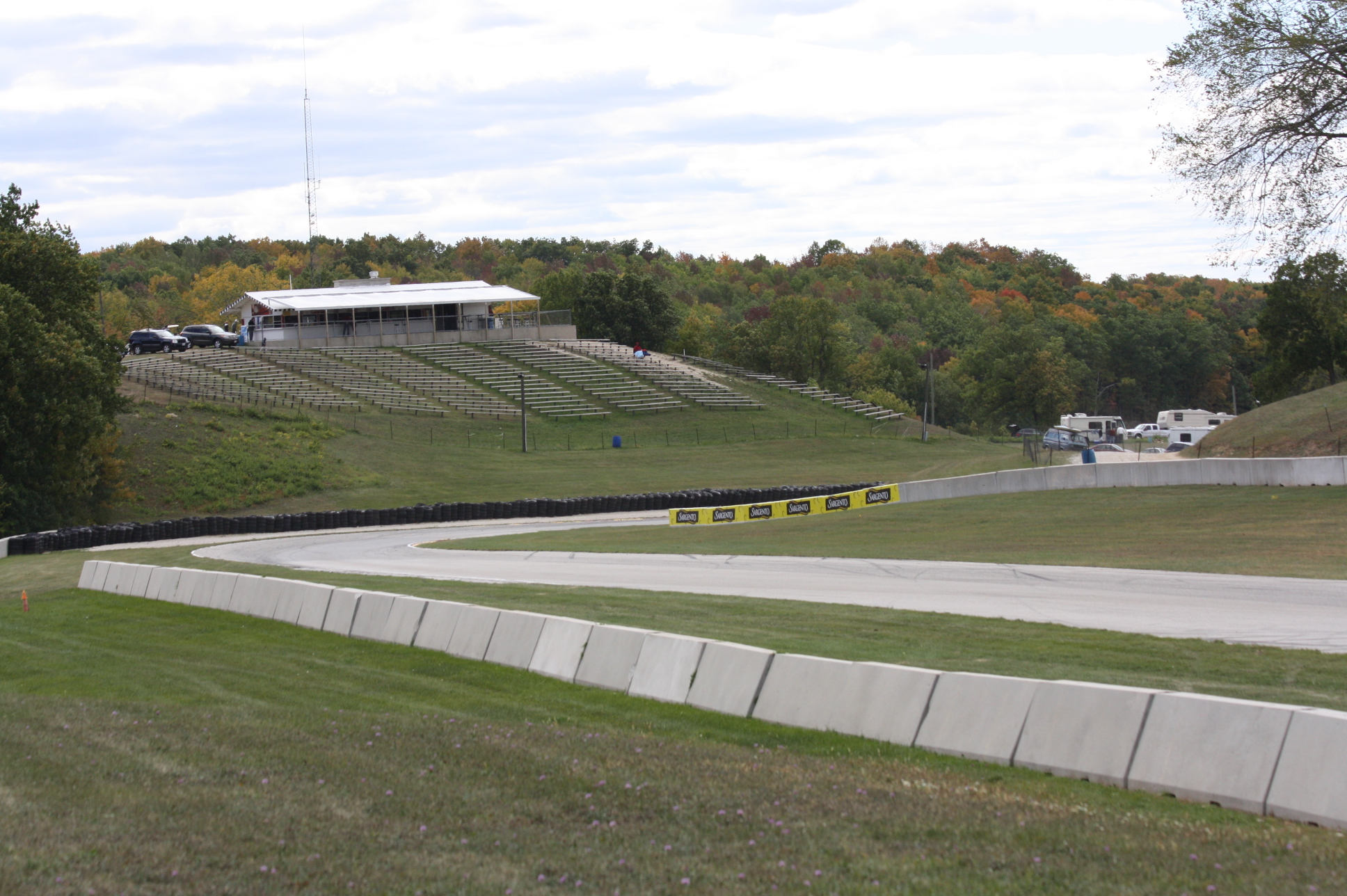
Road America, where the race was held.

International Motor Sports Association (IMSA) president Scott Atherton confirmed that the race was part of the 2014 United SportsCar Championship schedule in October 2013. It was the first year the event was held as part of the Tudor United SportsCar Championship. The 2014 Continental Tire Road Race Showcase was the tenth of thirteen scheduled sports car races of 2014 by IMSA, and it was the seventh round not held as part of the North American Endurance Cup. The event was held at the fourteen-turn 4.048 mi (6.515 km) Road America in Elkhart Lake, Wisconsin on August 10, 2014.

Before the race, João Barbosa and Christian Fittipaldi led the Prototype Drivers' Championship with 249 points, 2 points clear of Jordan Taylor and Ricky Taylor in second, and Richard Westbrook and Michael Valiante with 238 points. With 200 points, PC was led by Jon Bennett and Colin Braun with a forty four-point advantage over Martin Fuentes. In GTLM, the Drivers' Championship was led by Antonio García and Jan Magnussen with 219 points; the duo held a thirteen point gap over Kuno Wittmer and Jonathan Bomarito. Bill Sweedler and Townsend Bell led the GTD Drivers' Championship with 192 points, 9 points ahead of Leh Keen and Cooper MacNeil. Chevrolet and Ferrari were leading their respective Manufacturers' Championships, while Action Express Racing, CORE Autosport, Corvette Racing, and AIM Autosport were their respective Teams' Championships.

=== Entry list ===
Fifty-one cars were officially entered for the Continental Tire Road Race Showcase, with the bulk of entries in the Prototype (P) and Grand Touring Daytona (GTD) classes. Action Express Racing (AER), Marsh Racing, VisitFlorida Racing (VFR) and Wayne Taylor Racing (WTR) entered one Chevrolet Corvette DP. Chip Ganassi Racing (CGR) and Michael Shank Racing (MSR) entered one Ford-powered Riley MkXXVI while Starworks Motorsport entered one Honda-powered Riley MkXXVI. Speedsource had two Lola B12/80 while Extreme Speed Motorsports (ESM) entered two HPD ARX-03b cars and OAK Racing entered one Morgan LMP2 chassis with Nissan VK45DE 4.5 L V8 engine. The DeltaWing car was reinstated to the championship after missing the previous round. The Prototype Challenge (PC) class was composed of ten Oreca FLM09 cars: two from Starworks Motorsport and RSR Racing. BAR1 Motorsports, CORE Autosport, JDC-Miller MotorSports, Performance Tech, PR1/Mathiasen Motorsports, and 8Star Motorsports entered one car each. GTLM was represented by ten entries from five different brands. In the list of GTD entrants, eighteen GT-specification vehicles were represented by six different manufacturers.

== Practice ==
There were three practice sessions preceding the start of the race on Sunday, one on Friday and two on Saturday. The first two one-hour sessions were on Friday afternoon and Saturday morning while the third on Saturday afternoon lasted an hour.

== Qualifying ==
Saturday afternoon's 80-minute four-group qualifying session gave 15-minute sessions to all categories. Cars in GTD were sent out first before those grouped in GTLM, PC, and Prototype had three separate identically timed sessions. Regulations stipulated teams to nominate one qualifying driver, with the fastest laps determining each classes starting order. IMSA would arranged the grid to put all Prototypes ahead of the PC, GTLM, and GTD cars.

=== Qualifying results ===
Pole positions in each class are indicated in bold and by ‡. P stands for Prototype, PC (Prototype Challenge), GTLM (Grand Touring Le Mans) and GTD (Grand Touring Daytona).

Pos.	Class	No.	Team	Driver	Time	Gap	Grid
1	**P**	**1**	**(United States) Extreme Speed Motorsports**	**(United Kingdom) Ryan Dalziel**	**1:55.166**	**_**	1‡
2	P	90	(United States) Spirit of Daytona Racing	(United Kingdom) Richard Westbrook	1:55.487	+0.321	50
3	P	5	(United States) Action Express Racing	(Brazil) Christian Fittipaldi	1:55.961	+0.795	2
4	P	42	(France) OAK Racing	(France) Olivier Pla	1:56.019	+0.853	3
5	P	10	(United States) Wayne Taylor Racing	(United States) Ricky Taylor	1:56.175	+1.009	4
6	P	2	(United States) Extreme Speed Motorsports	(United States) Johannes van Overbeek	1:56.319	+1.153	5
7	P	01	(United States) Chip Ganassi Racing with Felix Sabates	(Mexico) Memo Rojas	1:56.395	+1.229	6
8	P	60	(United States) Michael Shank Racing with Curb/Agajanian	(Brazil) Oswaldo Negri	1:56.676	+1.510	7
9	P	31	(United States) Marsh Racing	(United States) Burt Frisselle	1:57.581	+2.415	8
10	P	0	(United States) DeltaWing Racing Cars	(United Kingdom) Andy Meyrick	1:57.754	+2.588	9
11	P	78	(United States) Starworks Motorsport	(Canada) James Hinchcliffe	1:58.013	+2.847	10
12	**PC**	**09**	**(United States) RSR Racing**	**(Brazil) Bruno Junqueira**	**1:59.411**	**+4.245**	11‡
13	PC	08	(United States) RSR Racing	(United Kingdom) Jack Hawksworth	1:59.493	+4.327	12
14	PC	25	(United States) 8Star Motorsports	(Mexico) Luis Díaz	1:59.931	+4.765	13
15	PC	8	(United States) Starworks Motorsport	(Netherlands) Renger van der Zande	2:00.087	+4.921	14
16	PC	38	(United States) Performance Tech	(Canada) David Ostella	2:00.144	+4.978	15
17	PC	54	(United States) CORE Autosport	(United States) Colin Braun	2:00.273	+5.107	16
18	PC	52	(United States) PR1/Mathiasen Motorsports	(United States) Gunnar Jeannette	2:00.395	+5.229	17
19	PC	7	(United States) Starworks Motorsport	(Australia) John Martin	2:01.024	+5.858	18
20	PC	85	(United States) JDC-Miller MotorSports	(South Africa) Stephen Simpson	2:01.077	+5.911	19
21	P	07	(United States) Speedsource	(United States) Tristan Nunez	2:01.614	+6.448	20
22	P	70	(United States) Speedsource	(United States) Tom Long	2:02.169	+7.003	21
23	**GTLM**	**56**	**(United States) BMW Team RLL**	**(United States) John Edwards**	**2:03.747**	**+8.581**	22‡
24	GTLM	93	(United States) SRT Motorsports	(United States) Jonathan Bomarito	2:03.813	+8.647	23
25	GTLM	91	(United States) SRT Motorsports	(Belgium) Marc Goossens	2:03.930	+8.764	24
26	GTLM	55	(United States) BMW Team RLL	(United States) Bill Auberlen	2:03.964	+8.798	25
27	GTLM	912	(United States) Porsche North America	(United States) Patrick Long	2:04.550	+9.384	26
28	GTLM	4	(United States) Corvette Racing	(United Kingdom) Oliver Gavin	2:04.650	+9.484	27
29	GTLM	911	(United States) Porsche North America	(United Kingdom) Nick Tandy	2:04.685	+9.519	28
30	GTLM	3	(United States) Corvette Racing	(Denmark) Jan Magnussen	2:04.738	+9.572	29
31	GTLM	62	(United States) Risi Competizione	(Italy) Giancarlo Fisichella	2:05.149	+9.983	30
32	GTLM	17	(United States) Team Falken Tire	(Germany) Wolf Henzler	2:06.527	+11.361	31
33	**GTD**	**007**	**(United States) TRG-AMR North America**	**(Australia) James Davison**	**2:09.079**	**+13.913**	32‡
34	GTD	94	(United States) Turner Motorsport	(United States) Dane Cameron	2:09.293	+14.147	33
35	GTD	33	(United States) Riley Motorsports	(Netherlands) Jeroen Bleekemolen	2:09.345	+14.179	34
36	GTD	23	(United States) Team Seattle/Alex Job Racing	(Germany) Mario Farnbacher	2:09.354	+14.188	35
37	GTD	22	(United States) Alex Job Racing	(United States) Leh Keen	2:09.434	+14.268	36
38	GTD	73	(United States) Park Place Motorsports	(France) Kévin Estre	2:09.471	+14.305	37
39	GTD	58	(United States) Snow Racing	(Belgium) Jan Heylen	2:09.555	+14.389	38
40	GTD	44	(United States) Magnus Racing	(United States) Andy Lally	2:09.753	+14.587	39
41	GTD	555	(Canada) AIM Autosport	(United States) Townsend Bell	2:09.968	+14.802	40
42	GTD	48	(United States) Paul Miller Racing	(Germany) Christopher Haase	2:10.495	+15.329	41
43	GTD	63	(United States) Scuderia Corsa	(Italy) Alessandro Balzan	2:10.673	+15.507	42
44	GTD	45	(United States) Flying Lizard Motorsports	(United States) Spencer Pumpelly	2:10.722	+15.556	43
45	GTD	27	(United States) Dempsey Racing	(United States) Andrew Davis	2:10.886	+15.720	44
46	GTD	18	(Belgium) Mühlner Motorsports America	(Australia) Alex Davison	2:11.444	+16.278	45
47	GTD	81	(United States) GB Autosport	(Republic of Ireland) Damien Faulkner	2:11.759	+16.593	46
48	GTD	19	(Belgium) Mühlner Motorsports America	(United States) Christian Szymczak	2:12.460	+17.294	47
49	GTD	35	(United States) Flying Lizard Motorsports	None	No Time Established		48
50	GTD	46	(United States) Fall-Line Motorsports	None	No Time Established		49
51	GTD	71	(United States) Park Place Motorsports	None	No Time Established		51
52	PC	88	(United States) BAR1 Motorsports	None	No Time Established		52

== Race ==
=== Race results ===
Class winners are denoted in bold and ‡. P stands for Prototype, PC (Prototype Challenge), GTLM (Grand Touring Le Mans) and GTD (Grand Touring Daytona).

Pos	Class	No.	Team	Drivers	Chassis	Tire	Laps	Time/Retired
Pos	Class	No.	Team	Drivers	Engine	Tire	Laps	Time/Retired
1	**P**	**5**	**(United States) Action Express Racing**	**(Portugal) João Barbosa (Brazil) Christian Fittipaldi**	**Chevrolet Corvette DP**	C	**61**	**2:46:52.622‡**
1	**P**	**5**	**(United States) Action Express Racing**	**(Portugal) João Barbosa (Brazil) Christian Fittipaldi**	**Chevrolet LS9 5.5 L V8**	C	**61**	**2:46:52.622‡**
2	P	60	(United States) Michael Shank Racing with Curb/Agajanian	(United States) John Pew (Brazil) Oswaldo Negri	Riley MkXXVI	C	61	+2.240
2	P	60	(United States) Michael Shank Racing with Curb/Agajanian	(United States) John Pew (Brazil) Oswaldo Negri	Ford EcoBoost 3.5 L Turbo V6	C	61	+2.240
3	P	1	(United States) Extreme Speed Motorsports	(United States) Scott Sharp (United Kingdom) Ryan Dalziel	HPD ARX-03b	C	61	+2.650
3	P	1	(United States) Extreme Speed Motorsports	(United States) Scott Sharp (United Kingdom) Ryan Dalziel	Honda HR28TT 2.8 L Turbo V6	C	61	+2.650
4	P	90	(United States) Spirit of Daytona Racing	(Canada) Michael Valiante (United Kingdom) Richard Westbrook	Chevrolet Corvette DP	C	61	+4.770
4	P	90	(United States) Spirit of Daytona Racing	(Canada) Michael Valiante (United Kingdom) Richard Westbrook	Chevrolet LS9 5.5 L V8	C	61	+4.770
5	P	31	(United States) Marsh Racing	(United States) Eric Curran (United States) Burt Frisselle	Chevrolet Corvette DP	C	61	+12.540
5	P	31	(United States) Marsh Racing	(United States) Eric Curran (United States) Burt Frisselle	Chevrolet LS9 5.5 L V8	C	61	+12.540
6	**PC**	**8**	**(United States) Starworks Motorsport**	**(Germany) Mirco Schultis (Netherlands) Renger van der Zande**	**Oreca FLM09**	C	**61**	**+19.796‡**
6	**PC**	**8**	**(United States) Starworks Motorsport**	**(Germany) Mirco Schultis (Netherlands) Renger van der Zande**	**Chevrolet 6.2 L V8**	C	**61**	**+19.796‡**
7	PC	25	(United States) 8Star Motorsports	(Mexico) Luis Díaz (United States) Sean Rayhall	Oreca FLM09	C	61	+20.211
7	PC	25	(United States) 8Star Motorsports	(Mexico) Luis Díaz (United States) Sean Rayhall	Chevrolet 6.2 L V8	C	61	+20.211
8	P	0	(United States) DeltaWing Racing Cars	(United Kingdom) Katherine Legge (United Kingdom) Andy Meyrick	DeltaWing DWC13	C	61	+23.838
8	P	0	(United States) DeltaWing Racing Cars	(United Kingdom) Katherine Legge (United Kingdom) Andy Meyrick	Élan (Mazda) 1.9 L I4 Turbo	C	61	+23.838
9	P	01	(United States) Chip Ganassi Racing with Felix Sabates	(United States) Scott Pruett (Mexico) Memo Rojas	Riley MkXXVI	C	61	+24.441
9	P	01	(United States) Chip Ganassi Racing with Felix Sabates	(United States) Scott Pruett (Mexico) Memo Rojas	Ford EcoBoost 3.5 L Turbo V6	C	61	+24.441
10	P	2	(United States) Extreme Speed Motorsports	(United States) Ed Brown (United States) Johannes van Overbeek	HPD ARX-03b	C	61	+24.746
10	P	2	(United States) Extreme Speed Motorsports	(United States) Ed Brown (United States) Johannes van Overbeek	Honda HR28TT 2.8 L Turbo V6	C	61	+24.746
11	PC	85	(United States) JDC-Miller MotorSports	(United States) Chris Miller (South Africa) Stephen Simpson	Oreca FLM09	C	61	+26.034
11	PC	85	(United States) JDC-Miller MotorSports	(United States) Chris Miller (South Africa) Stephen Simpson	Chevrolet 6.2 L V8	C	61	+26.034
12	PC	08	(United States) RSR Racing	(Canada) Chris Cumming (United Kingdom) Jack Hawksworth	Oreca FLM09	C	61	+26.583
12	PC	08	(United States) RSR Racing	(Canada) Chris Cumming (United Kingdom) Jack Hawksworth	Chevrolet 6.2 L V8	C	61	+26.583
13	**GTLM**	**62**	**(United States) Risi Competizione**	**(Italy) Giancarlo Fisichella (Germany) Pierre Kaffer**	**Ferrari 458 Italia GT2**	MI	**61**	**+51.424‡**
13	**GTLM**	**62**	**(United States) Risi Competizione**	**(Italy) Giancarlo Fisichella (Germany) Pierre Kaffer**	**Ferrari 4.5 L V8**	MI	**61**	**+51.424‡**
14	PC	7	(United States) Starworks Motorsport	(Australia) John Martin (Mexico) Martin Fuentes (Venezuela) Alex Popow	Oreca FLM09	C	61	+51.905
14	PC	7	(United States) Starworks Motorsport	(Australia) John Martin (Mexico) Martin Fuentes (Venezuela) Alex Popow	Chevrolet 6.2 L V8	C	61	+51.905
15	GTLM	56	(United States) BMW Team RLL	(United States) John Edwards (Germany) Dirk Müller	BMW Z4 GTE	MI	61	+53.012
15	GTLM	56	(United States) BMW Team RLL	(United States) John Edwards (Germany) Dirk Müller	BMW 4.4 L V8	MI	61	+53.012
16	GTLM	93	(United States) SRT Motorsports	(United States) Jonathan Bomarito (Canada) Kuno Wittmer (Belgium) Marc Goossens	SRT Viper GTS-R	MI	61	+53.087
16	GTLM	93	(United States) SRT Motorsports	(United States) Jonathan Bomarito (Canada) Kuno Wittmer (Belgium) Marc Goossens	SRT 8.0 L V10	MI	61	+53.087
17	PC	38	(United States) Performance Tech	(Canada) David Ostella (United States) James French	Oreca FLM09	C	61	+53.224
17	PC	38	(United States) Performance Tech	(Canada) David Ostella (United States) James French	Chevrolet 6.2 L V8	C	61	+53.224
18	P	07	(United States) Speedsource	(United States) Joel Miller (United States) Tristan Nunez	Mazda Prototype	C	61	+53.894
18	P	07	(United States) Speedsource	(United States) Joel Miller (United States) Tristan Nunez	Mazda Skyactiv-D 2.2 L Turbo I4 (Diesel)	C	61	+53.894
19	GTLM	91	(United States) SRT Motorsports	(Belgium) Marc Goossens (Germany) Dominik Farnbacher (United States) Jonathan Bomarito	SRT Viper GTS-R	MI	61	+54.534
19	GTLM	91	(United States) SRT Motorsports	(Belgium) Marc Goossens (Germany) Dominik Farnbacher (United States) Jonathan Bomarito	SRT 8.0 L V10	MI	61	+54.534
20	GTLM	912	(United States) Porsche North America	(United States) Patrick Long (Denmark) Michael Christensen	Porsche 911 RSR	MI	61	+57.904
20	GTLM	912	(United States) Porsche North America	(United States) Patrick Long (Denmark) Michael Christensen	Porsche 4.0 L Flat-6	MI	61	+57.904
21	GTLM	3	(United States) Corvette Racing	(Spain) Antonio García (Denmark) Jan Magnussen	Chevrolet Corvette C7.R	MI	61	+57.991
21	GTLM	3	(United States) Corvette Racing	(Spain) Antonio García (Denmark) Jan Magnussen	Chevrolet LT5.5 5.5 L V8	MI	61	+57.991
22	GTLM	4	(United States) Corvette Racing	(United Kingdom) Oliver Gavin (United States) Tommy Milner	Chevrolet Corvette C7.R	MI	61	+59.854
22	GTLM	4	(United States) Corvette Racing	(United Kingdom) Oliver Gavin (United States) Tommy Milner	Chevrolet LT5.5 5.5 L V8	MI	61	+59.854
23	GTLM	55	(United States) BMW Team RLL	(United States) Bill Auberlen (United Kingdom) Andy Priaulx	BMW Z4 GTE	MI	61	+1:00.369
23	GTLM	55	(United States) BMW Team RLL	(United States) Bill Auberlen (United Kingdom) Andy Priaulx	BMW 4.4 L V8	MI	61	+1:00.369
24	GTLM	17	(United States) Team Falken Tire	(Germany) Wolf Henzler (United States) Bryan Sellers	Porsche 911 RSR	FAL	61	+1:02.409
24	GTLM	17	(United States) Team Falken Tire	(Germany) Wolf Henzler (United States) Bryan Sellers	Porsche 4.0 L Flat-6	FAL	61	+1:02.409
25	GTLM	911	(United States) Porsche North America	(United Kingdom) Nick Tandy (Austria) Richard Lietz	Porsche 911 RSR	MI	61	+1:09.409
25	GTLM	911	(United States) Porsche North America	(United Kingdom) Nick Tandy (Austria) Richard Lietz	Porsche 4.0 L Flat-6	MI	61	+1:09.409
26	**GTD**	**94**	**(United States) Turner Motorsport**	**(United States) Dane Cameron (Finland) Markus Palttala**	**BMW Z4 GT3**	C	**59**	**+2 Laps‡**
26	**GTD**	**94**	**(United States) Turner Motorsport**	**(United States) Dane Cameron (Finland) Markus Palttala**	**BMW 4.4 L V8**	C	**59**	**+2 Laps‡**
27	GTD	22	(United States) Alex Job Racing	(United States) Leh Keen (United States) Cooper MacNeil	Porsche 911 GT America	C	59	+2 Laps
27	GTD	22	(United States) Alex Job Racing	(United States) Leh Keen (United States) Cooper MacNeil	Porsche 4.0L Flat-6	C	59	+2 Laps
28	GTD	58	(United States) Snow Racing	(Belgium) Jan Heylen (United States) Madison Snow	Porsche 911 GT America	C	59	+2 Laps
28	GTD	58	(United States) Snow Racing	(Belgium) Jan Heylen (United States) Madison Snow	Porsche 4.0L Flat-6	C	59	+2 Laps
29	GTD	33	(United States) Riley Motorsports	(Netherlands) Jeroen Bleekemolen (United States) Ben Keating	SRT Viper GT3-R	C	59	+2 Laps
29	GTD	33	(United States) Riley Motorsports	(Netherlands) Jeroen Bleekemolen (United States) Ben Keating	SRT 8.0 L V10	C	59	+2 Laps
30	GTD	555	(Canada) AIM Autosport	(United States) Townsend Bell (United States) Bill Sweedler	Ferrari 458 Italia GT3	C	59	+2 Laps
30	GTD	555	(Canada) AIM Autosport	(United States) Townsend Bell (United States) Bill Sweedler	Ferrari 4.5L V8	C	59	+2 Laps
31	GTD	23	(United States) Team Seattle/Alex Job Racing	(Germany) Mario Farnbacher (United Kingdom) Ian James	Porsche 911 GT America	C	59	+2 Laps
31	GTD	23	(United States) Team Seattle/Alex Job Racing	(Germany) Mario Farnbacher (United Kingdom) Ian James	Porsche 4.0L Flat-6	C	59	+2 Laps
32	GTD	45	(United States) Flying Lizard Motorsports	(Venezuela) Nelson Canache Jr. (United States) Spencer Pumpelly	Audi R8 LMS ultra	C	59	+2 Laps
32	GTD	45	(United States) Flying Lizard Motorsports	(Venezuela) Nelson Canache Jr. (United States) Spencer Pumpelly	Audi 5.2 L V10	C	59	+2 Laps
33	GTD	35	(United States) Flying Lizard Motorsports	(South Africa) Dion von Moltke (United States) Andrew Palmer	Audi R8 LMS ultra	C	59	+2 Laps
33	GTD	35	(United States) Flying Lizard Motorsports	(South Africa) Dion von Moltke (United States) Andrew Palmer	Audi 5.2 L V10	C	59	+2 Laps
34	GTD	46	(United States) Fall-Line Motorsports	(United States) Charles Espenlaub (United States) Charles Putman (United Kingdom) Marino Franchitti	Audi R8 LMS ultra	C	59	+2 Laps
34	GTD	46	(United States) Fall-Line Motorsports	(United States) Charles Espenlaub (United States) Charles Putman (United Kingdom) Marino Franchitti	Audi 5.2 L V10	C	59	+2 Laps
35	GTD	73	(United States) Park Place Motorsports	(United States) Patrick Lindsey (France) Kévin Estre	Porsche 911 GT America		59	+2 Laps
35	GTD	73	(United States) Park Place Motorsports	(United States) Patrick Lindsey (France) Kévin Estre	Porsche 4.0L Flat-6		59	+2 Laps
36	GTD	48	(United States) Paul Miller Racing	(Germany) Christopher Haase (United States) Bryce Miller	Audi R8 LMS ultra	C	58	+3 Laps
36	GTD	48	(United States) Paul Miller Racing	(Germany) Christopher Haase (United States) Bryce Miller	Audi 5.2 L V10	C	58	+3 Laps
37	GTD	81	(United States) GB Autosport	(United Kingdom) Ben Barker (Republic of Ireland) Damien Faulkner	Porsche 911 GT America	C	57	+4 Laps
37	GTD	81	(United States) GB Autosport	(United Kingdom) Ben Barker (Republic of Ireland) Damien Faulkner	Porsche 4.0L Flat-6	C	57	+4 Laps
38 DNF	PC	52	(United States) PR1/Mathiasen Motorsports	(United States) Gunnar Jeannette (United States) Frankie Montecalvo	Oreca FLM09	C	55	Did Not Finish
38 DNF	PC	52	(United States) PR1/Mathiasen Motorsports	(United States) Gunnar Jeannette (United States) Frankie Montecalvo	Chevrolet 6.2 L V8	C	55	Did Not Finish
39	PC	54	(United States) CORE Autosport	(United States) Jon Bennett (United States) Colin Braun	Oreca FLM09	C	53	+8 Laps
39	PC	54	(United States) CORE Autosport	(United States) Jon Bennett (United States) Colin Braun	Chevrolet 6.2 L V8	C	53	+8 Laps
40	GTD	27	(United States) Dempsey Racing	(United States) Andrew Davis (United States) Patrick Dempsey	Porsche 911 GT America	C	50	+11 Laps
40	GTD	27	(United States) Dempsey Racing	(United States) Andrew Davis (United States) Patrick Dempsey	Porsche 4.0L Flat-6	C	50	+11 Laps
41 DNF	P	10	(United States) Wayne Taylor Racing	(United States) Ricky Taylor (United States) Jordan Taylor	Chevrolet Corvette DP	C	47	Did Not Finish
41 DNF	P	10	(United States) Wayne Taylor Racing	(United States) Ricky Taylor (United States) Jordan Taylor	Chevrolet LS9 5.5 L V8	C	47	Did Not Finish
42 DNF	P	42	(France) OAK Racing	(France) Olivier Pla (Colombia) Gustavo Yacamán	Morgan LMP2	C	44	Did Not Finish
42 DNF	P	42	(France) OAK Racing	(France) Olivier Pla (Colombia) Gustavo Yacamán	Nissan VK45DE 4.5 L V8	C	44	Did Not Finish
43	GTD	44	(United States) Magnus Racing	(United States) Andy Lally (United States) John Potter	Porsche 911 GT America	C	44	+17 Laps
43	GTD	44	(United States) Magnus Racing	(United States) Andy Lally (United States) John Potter	Porsche 4.0L Flat-6	C	44	+17 Laps
44	GTD	19	(Belgium) Mühlner Motorsports America	(United States) Mark Klenin (United States) Christian Szymczak	Porsche 911 GT America	C	43	+18 Laps
44	GTD	19	(Belgium) Mühlner Motorsports America	(United States) Mark Klenin (United States) Christian Szymczak	Porsche 4.0L Flat-6	C	43	+18 Laps
45 DNF	GTD	63	(United States) Scuderia Corsa	(Italy) Alessandro Balzan (United States) Jeff Westphal	Ferrari 458 Italia GT3	C	18	Did Not Finish
45 DNF	GTD	63	(United States) Scuderia Corsa	(Italy) Alessandro Balzan (United States) Jeff Westphal	Ferrari 4.5L V8	C	18	Did Not Finish
46 DNF	GTD	18	(Belgium) Mühlner Motorsports America	(Australia) David Calvert-Jones (Australia) Alex Davison	Porsche 911 GT America	C	13	Did Not Finish
46 DNF	GTD	18	(Belgium) Mühlner Motorsports America	(Australia) David Calvert-Jones (Australia) Alex Davison	Porsche 4.0L Flat-6	C	13	Did Not Finish
47 DNF	P	78	(United States) Starworks Motorsport	(United States) Scott Mayer (Canada) James Hinchcliffe	Riley MkXXVI	C	2	Did Not Finish
47 DNF	P	78	(United States) Starworks Motorsport	(United States) Scott Mayer (Canada) James Hinchcliffe	Honda HR35TT 3.5 L Turbo V6	C	2	Did Not Finish
48 DNF	PC	09	(United States) RSR Racing	(United States) Duncan Ende (Brazil) Bruno Junqueira	Oreca FLM09	C	2	Did Not Finish
48 DNF	PC	09	(United States) RSR Racing	(United States) Duncan Ende (Brazil) Bruno Junqueira	Chevrolet 6.2 L V8	C	2	Did Not Finish
49 DNS	P	70	(United States) Speedsource	(United States) Tom Long (Canada) Sylvain Tremblay	Mazda Prototype	C	--	Did Not Start
49 DNS	P	70	(United States) Speedsource	(United States) Tom Long (Canada) Sylvain Tremblay	Mazda Skyactiv-D 2.2 L Turbo I4 (Diesel)	C	--	Did Not Start
50 DNS	GTD	007	(United States) TRG-AMR North America	(United States) Al Carter (Australia) James Davison	Aston Martin V12 Vantage GT3	C	--	Did Not Finish
50 DNS	GTD	007	(United States) TRG-AMR North America	(United States) Al Carter (Australia) James Davison	Aston Martin 6.0 L V12	C	--	Did Not Finish

Tyre manufacturers
Key
Symbol	Tyre manufacturer
**C**	Continental
**MI**	Michelin
**FAL**	Falken Tire

United SportsCar Championship
Previous race: Brickyard Grand Prix	2014 season	Next race: Oak Tree Grand Prix
