= 2015 6 Hours of The Glen =

Sports Car race

Track Map of Watkins Glen International.

The 2015 Sahlen's Six Hours of The Glen was a sports car race sanctioned by the International Motor Sports Association (IMSA). The race was held at Watkins Glen International in Watkins Glen, New York on the June 28, 2015. This race was the sixth round of the 2015 United SportsCar Championship.

== Background ==
=== Preview ===
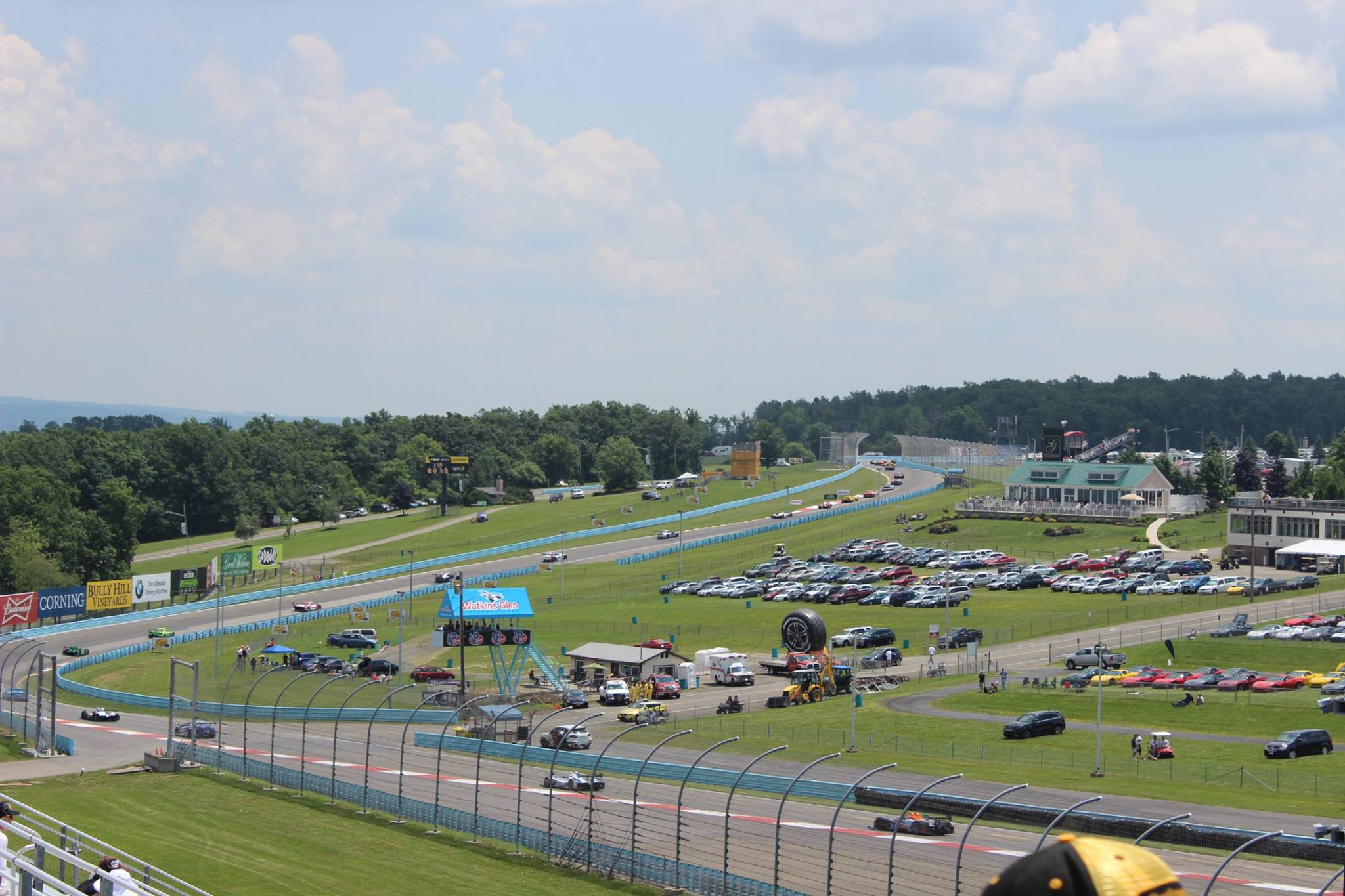
Watkins Glen International, where the race was held.

International Motor Sports Association (IMSA) president Scott Atherton confirmed the race was part of the schedule for the 2015 IMSA Tudor United SportsCar Championship (IMSA TUSC) in August 2014. It was the second consecutive year the event was held as part of the Tudor United SportsCar Championship. The 2015 Sahlen's Six Hours of The Glen was the sixth of twelve scheduled sports car races of 2015 by IMSA, and was the third round of the Patron North American Endurance Cup. The race was held at the eleven-turn 3.450 mi (5.552 km) Watkins Glen International circuit on June 28, 2015.

=== Entry list ===
Thirty-four cars were officially entered into the Sahlen's Six Hours of The Glen, with most of the entries in the Prototype, Grand Touring Le Mans (GTLM), and Grand Touring Daytona (GTD) categories. Action Express Racing (AER) fielded two Chevrolet Corvette DP cars while VisitFlorida Racing (VFR) and Wayne Taylor Racing (WTR) fielded one. Chip Ganassi Racing (CGR) entered one Ford-powered Riley MkXXVI. Mazda Motorsports had one Lola B12/80. Michael Shank Racing (MSR) entered one Ligier JS P2 chassis with Honda HR28TT twin-turbocharged 2.8-liter V6 engine and The DeltaWing car after skipping the previous round at Belle Isle. The Prototype Challenge (PC) class was composed of seven Oreca FLM09 cars. BAR1 Motorsports, CORE Autosport, JDC-Miller MotorSports, Performance Tech PR1/Mathiasen Motorsports, RSR Racing, and Starworks Motorsport entered one car each. GTLM was represented by eight entries from four different brands. In the list of GTD entrants, eleven GT-specification vehicles were represented by six different manufacturers.

== Qualifying ==
Qualifying was cancelled due to poor weather conditions. Starting positions were set by drivers' championship standings.

Pos.	Class	No.	Team	Driver	Time	Gap	Grid
1	P	5	(United States) Action Express Racing	No Time Established			1‡
2	P	90	(United States) VisitFlorida.com Racing	No Time Established			2
3	P	31	(United States) Action Express Racing	No Time Established			3
4	P	10	(United States) Wayne Taylor Racing	No Time Established			4
5	P	01	(United States) Chip Ganassi Racing	No Time Established			5
6	P	60	(United States) Michael Shank Racing with Curb/Agajanian	No Time Established			6
7	P	07	(United States) SpeedSource	No Time Established			7
8	P	0	(United States) DeltaWing Racing Cars with Claro/TracFone	No Time Established			8
9	PC	54	(United States) CORE Autosport	No Time Established			9‡
10	PC	52	(United States) PR1/Mathiasen Motorsports	No Time Established			10
11	PC	85	(United States) JDC-Miller MotorSports	No Time Established			11
12	PC	11	(United States) RSR Racing	No Time Established			12
13	PC	38	(United States) Performance Tech Motorsports	No Time Established			13
14	PC	8	(United States) Starworks Motorsport	No Time Established			14
15	PC	16	(United States) BAR1 Motorsports	No Time Established			15
16	GTLM	3	(United States) Corvette Racing	No Time Established			16‡
17	GTLM	25	(United States) BMW Team RLL	No Time Established			17
18	GTLM	24	(United States) BMW Team RLL	No Time Established			18
19	GTLM	62	(United States) Risi Competizione	No Time Established			19
20	GTLM	911	(United States) Porsche North America	No Time Established			20
21	GTLM	4	(United States) Corvette Racing	No Time Established			21
22	GTLM	17	(United States) Team Falken Tire	No Time Established			22
23	GTLM	912	(United States) Porsche North America	No Time Established			23
24	GTD	48	(United States) Paul Miller Racing	No Time Established			24‡
25	GTD	007	(United States) TRG-AMR North America	No Time Established			25
26	GTD	22	(United States) Alex Job Racing	No Time Established			26
27	GTD	63	(United States) Scuderia Corsa	No Time Established			27
28	GTD	23	(United States) Team Seattle / Alex Job Racing	No Time Established			28
29	GTD	73	(United States) Park Place Motorsports	No Time Established			29
30	GTD	44	(United States) Magnus Racing	No Time Established			30
31	GTD	97	(United States) Turner Motorsport	No Time Established			31
32	GTD	33	(United States) Riley Motorsports	No Time Established			32
33	GTD	58	(United States) Wright Motorsports	No Time Established			33
34	GTD	93	(United States) Riley Motorsports	No Time Established			34

== Race ==
=== Race results ===
Class winners are denoted in bold and ‡. P stands for Prototype, PC (Prototype Challenge), GTLM (Grand Touring Le Mans) and GTD (Grand Touring Daytona).

Final race classification
Pos	Class	No.	Team	Drivers	Chassis	Tire	Laps	Time/Retired
Pos	Class	No.	Team	Drivers	Engine	Tire	Laps	Time/Retired
1	**P**	**90**	**(United States) VisitFlorida.com Racing**	**(United Kingdom) Richard Westbrook (Canada) Michael Valiante**	**Corvette Daytona Prototype**	C	**160**	**6:00:59.464‡**
1	**P**	**90**	**(United States) VisitFlorida.com Racing**	**(United Kingdom) Richard Westbrook (Canada) Michael Valiante**	**Chevrolet 5.5 L V8**	C	**160**	**6:00:59.464‡**
2	P	01	(United States) Chip Ganassi Racing	(United States) Joey Hand (United States) Scott Pruett	Ford EcoBoost Riley DP	C	160	+11.351
2	P	01	(United States) Chip Ganassi Racing	(United States) Joey Hand (United States) Scott Pruett	Ford EcoBoost 3.5 L V6 Turbo	C	160	+11.351
3	P	5	(United States) Action Express Racing	(Portugal) João Barbosa (Brazil) Christian Fittipaldi (Italy) Max Papis	Corvette Daytona Prototype	C	160	+15.045
3	P	5	(United States) Action Express Racing	(Portugal) João Barbosa (Brazil) Christian Fittipaldi (Italy) Max Papis	Chevrolet 5.5 L V8	C	160	+15.045
4	**PC**	**8**	**(United States) Starworks Motorsport**	**(United States) Mike Hedlund (Venezuela) Alex Popow (Netherlands) Renger van der Zande**	**Oreca FLM09**	C	**158**	**+2 Laps‡**
4	**PC**	**8**	**(United States) Starworks Motorsport**	**(United States) Mike Hedlund (Venezuela) Alex Popow (Netherlands) Renger van der Zande**	**Chevrolet 6.2 L V8**	C	**158**	**+2 Laps‡**
5	PC	52	(United States) PR1/Mathiasen Motorsports	(United States) Mike Guasch (United States) Andrew Palmer (United Kingdom) Tom Kimber-Smith	Oreca FLM09	C	158	+2 Laps
5	PC	52	(United States) PR1/Mathiasen Motorsports	(United States) Mike Guasch (United States) Andrew Palmer (United Kingdom) Tom Kimber-Smith	Chevrolet 6.2 L V8	C	158	+2 Laps
6	PC	16	(United States) BAR1 Motorsports	(Canada) Daniel Burkett (United States) Matt McMurry (United Kingdom) Martin Plowman	Oreca FLM09	C	158	+2 Laps
6	PC	16	(United States) BAR1 Motorsports	(Canada) Daniel Burkett (United States) Matt McMurry (United Kingdom) Martin Plowman	Chevrolet 6.2 L V8	C	158	+2 Laps
7	PC	54	(United States) CORE Autosport	(United States) Jon Bennett (United States) Colin Braun (United States) James Gue	Oreca FLM09	C	158	+2 Laps
7	PC	54	(United States) CORE Autosport	(United States) Jon Bennett (United States) Colin Braun (United States) James Gue	Chevrolet 6.2 L V8	C	158	+2 Laps
8	P	31	(United States) Action Express Racing	(United States) Eric Curran (United States) Dane Cameron (Italy) Max Papis	Corvette Daytona Prototype	C	158	+2 Laps
8	P	31	(United States) Action Express Racing	(United States) Eric Curran (United States) Dane Cameron (Italy) Max Papis	Chevrolet 5.5 L V8	C	158	+2 Laps
9	PC	85	(United States) JDC-Miller MotorSports	(Canada) Misha Goikhberg (United States) Chris Miller (United States) Rusty Mitchell	Oreca FLM09	C	158	+2 Laps
9	PC	85	(United States) JDC-Miller MotorSports	(Canada) Misha Goikhberg (United States) Chris Miller (United States) Rusty Mitchell	Chevrolet 6.2 L V8	C	158	+2 Laps
10	**GTLM**	**17**	**(United States) Team Falken Tire**	**(United States) Bryan Sellers (Germany) Wolf Henzler**	**Porsche 911 RSR**	FAL	**157**	**+3 Laps‡**
10	**GTLM**	**17**	**(United States) Team Falken Tire**	**(United States) Bryan Sellers (Germany) Wolf Henzler**	**Porsche 4.0 L Flat-6**	FAL	**157**	**+3 Laps‡**
11	GTLM	912	(United States) Porsche North America	(New Zealand) Earl Bamber (Germany) Jörg Bergmeister (United Kingdom) Nick Tandy	Porsche 911 RSR	MI	157	+3 Laps
11	GTLM	912	(United States) Porsche North America	(New Zealand) Earl Bamber (Germany) Jörg Bergmeister (United Kingdom) Nick Tandy	Porsche 4.0 L Flat-6	MI	157	+3 Laps
12	GTLM	25	(United States) BMW Team RLL	(United States) Bill Auberlen (Germany) Dirk Werner	BMW Z4 GTE	MI	157	+3 Laps
12	GTLM	25	(United States) BMW Team RLL	(United States) Bill Auberlen (Germany) Dirk Werner	BMW 4.4 L V8	MI	157	+3 Laps
13	GTLM	3	(United States) Corvette Racing	(Spain) Antonio García (Denmark) Jan Magnussen	Chevrolet Corvette C7.R	MI	157	+3 Laps
13	GTLM	3	(United States) Corvette Racing	(Spain) Antonio García (Denmark) Jan Magnussen	Chevrolet LT5.5 5.5 L V8	MI	157	+3 Laps
14	GTLM	62	(United States) Risi Competizione	(Germany) Pierre Kaffer (Italy) Giancarlo Fisichella	Ferrari 458 Italia GT2	MI	157	+3 Laps
14	GTLM	62	(United States) Risi Competizione	(Germany) Pierre Kaffer (Italy) Giancarlo Fisichella	Ferrari 4.5 L V8	MI	157	+3 Laps
15	GTLM	911	(United States) Porsche North America	(New Zealand) Earl Bamber (France) Patrick Pilet (United Kingdom) Nick Tandy	Porsche 911 RSR	MI	157	+3 Laps
15	GTLM	911	(United States) Porsche North America	(New Zealand) Earl Bamber (France) Patrick Pilet (United Kingdom) Nick Tandy	Porsche 4.0 L Flat-6	MI	157	+3 Laps
16	**GTD**	**93**	**(United States) Riley Motorsports**	**(United States) Al Carter (Belgium) Marc Goossens (United States) Cameron Lawrence**	**Dodge Viper GT3-R**	C	**152**	**+8 Laps‡**
16	**GTD**	**93**	**(United States) Riley Motorsports**	**(United States) Al Carter (Belgium) Marc Goossens (United States) Cameron Lawrence**	**Dodge 8.3 L V10**	C	**152**	**+8 Laps‡**
17	GTD	44	(United States) Magnus Racing	(United States) John Potter (United States) Andy Lally (Germany) Marco Seefried	Porsche 911 GT America	C	152	+8 Laps
17	GTD	44	(United States) Magnus Racing	(United States) John Potter (United States) Andy Lally (Germany) Marco Seefried	Porsche 4.0 L Flat-6	C	152	+8 Laps
18	GTD	48	(United States) Paul Miller Racing	(Germany) Christopher Haase (United States) Bryce Miller (South Africa) Dion von Moltke	Audi R8 LMS ultra	C	152	+8 Laps
18	GTD	48	(United States) Paul Miller Racing	(Germany) Christopher Haase (United States) Bryce Miller (South Africa) Dion von Moltke	Audi 5.2 L V10	C	152	+8 Laps
19	GTD	63	(United States) Scuderia Corsa	(United States) Bill Sweedler (United States) Townsend Bell	Ferrari 458 Italia GT3	C	152	+8 Laps
19	GTD	63	(United States) Scuderia Corsa	(United States) Bill Sweedler (United States) Townsend Bell	Ferrari 4.5 L V8	C	152	+8 Laps
20	GTD	22	(United States) Alex Job Racing	(United States) Andrew Davis (United States) Leh Keen (United States) Cooper MacNeil	Porsche 911 GT America	C	152	+8 Laps
20	GTD	22	(United States) Alex Job Racing	(United States) Andrew Davis (United States) Leh Keen (United States) Cooper MacNeil	Porsche 4.0 L Flat-6	C	152	+8 Laps
21	GTD	33	(United States) Riley Motorsports	(Netherlands) Jeroen Bleekemolen (United States) Ben Keating	Dodge Viper GT3-R	C	152	+8 Laps
21	GTD	33	(United States) Riley Motorsports	(Netherlands) Jeroen Bleekemolen (United States) Ben Keating	Dodge 8.3 L V10	C	152	+8 Laps
22	GTD	23	(United States) Team Seattle / Alex Job Racing	(Germany) Mario Farnbacher (United Kingdom) Ian James	Porsche 911 GT America	C	152	+8 Laps
22	GTD	23	(United States) Team Seattle / Alex Job Racing	(Germany) Mario Farnbacher (United Kingdom) Ian James	Porsche 4.0 L Flat-6	C	152	+8 Laps
23	GTD	58	(United States) Wright Motorsports	(Belgium) Jan Heylen (United States) Madison Snow	Porsche 911 GT America	C	152	+8 Laps
23	GTD	58	(United States) Wright Motorsports	(Belgium) Jan Heylen (United States) Madison Snow	Porsche 4.0 L Flat-6	C	152	+8 Laps
24 DNF	GTD	97	(United States) Turner Motorsport	(United States) Michael Marsal (Finland) Markus Palttala	BMW Z4 GT3	C	151	Accident
24 DNF	GTD	97	(United States) Turner Motorsport	(United States) Michael Marsal (Finland) Markus Palttala	BMW 4.4 L V8	C	151	Accident
25 DNF	GTD	007	(United States) TRG-AMR North America	(Denmark) Christina Nielsen (Canada) Kuno Wittmer	Aston Martin V12 Vantage GT3	C	148	Accident
25 DNF	GTD	007	(United States) TRG-AMR North America	(Denmark) Christina Nielsen (Canada) Kuno Wittmer	Aston Martin 6.0 L V12	C	148	Accident
26 DNF	GTD	73	(United States) Park Place Motorsports	(United States) Patrick Lindsey (United States) Spencer Pumpelly	Porsche 911 GT America	C	147	Accident
26 DNF	GTD	73	(United States) Park Place Motorsports	(United States) Patrick Lindsey (United States) Spencer Pumpelly	Porsche 4.0 L Flat-6	C	147	Accident
27	P	07	(United States) SpeedSource	(United States) Tom Long (United States) Joel Miller (United Kingdom) Ben Devlin	Mazda Prototype	C	144	+16 Laps
27	P	07	(United States) SpeedSource	(United States) Tom Long (United States) Joel Miller (United Kingdom) Ben Devlin	Mazda Skyactiv-D 2.2 L Turbo I4 (Diesel)	C	144	+16 Laps
28 DNF	P	10	(United States) Wayne Taylor Racing	(United States) Jordan Taylor (United States) Ricky Taylor (Italy) Max Angelelli	Corvette Daytona Prototype	C	143	Accident
28 DNF	P	10	(United States) Wayne Taylor Racing	(United States) Jordan Taylor (United States) Ricky Taylor (Italy) Max Angelelli	Chevrolet 5.5 L V8	C	143	Accident
29 DNF	GTLM	4	(United States) Corvette Racing	(United Kingdom) Oliver Gavin (United States) Tommy Milner	Chevrolet Corvette C7.R	MI	136	Steering
29 DNF	GTLM	4	(United States) Corvette Racing	(United Kingdom) Oliver Gavin (United States) Tommy Milner	Chevrolet LT5.5 5.5 L V8	MI	136	Steering
30	PC	11	(United States) RSR Racing	(Canada) Chris Cumming (Brazil) Bruno Junqueira	Oreca FLM09	C	110	+50 Laps
30	PC	11	(United States) RSR Racing	(Canada) Chris Cumming (Brazil) Bruno Junqueira	Chevrolet 6.2 L V8	C	110	+50 Laps
31	PC	38	(United States) Performance Tech Motorsports	(United States) James French (United States) Conor Daly (United States) Jerome Mee	Oreca FLM09	C	105	+55 Laps
31	PC	38	(United States) Performance Tech Motorsports	(United States) James French (United States) Conor Daly (United States) Jerome Mee	Chevrolet 6.2 L V8	C	105	+55 Laps
32 DNF	P	60	(United States) Michael Shank Racing with Curb/Agajanian	(United States) John Pew (Brazil) Oswaldo Negri Jr.	Ligier JS P2	C	102	Suspension
32 DNF	P	60	(United States) Michael Shank Racing with Curb/Agajanian	(United States) John Pew (Brazil) Oswaldo Negri Jr.	Honda HR28TT 2.8 L V6 Turbo	C	102	Suspension
33 DNF	P	0	(United States) DeltaWing Racing Cars with Claro/TracFone	(Mexico) Memo Rojas (United Kingdom) Katherine Legge	DeltaWing DWC13	C	95	Gearbox
33 DNF	P	0	(United States) DeltaWing Racing Cars with Claro/TracFone	(Mexico) Memo Rojas (United Kingdom) Katherine Legge	Élan (Mazda) 1.9 L I4 Turbo	C	95	Gearbox
34 DNF	GTLM	24	(United States) BMW Team RLL	(United States) John Edwards (Germany) Lucas Luhr	BMW Z4 GTE	MI	77	Accident
34 DNF	GTLM	24	(United States) BMW Team RLL	(United States) John Edwards (Germany) Lucas Luhr	BMW 4.4 L V8	MI	77	Accident

Tyre manufacturers
Key
Symbol	Tyre manufacturer
**C**	Continental
**MI**	Michelin
**FAL**	Falken Tire

United SportsCar Championship
Previous race: Chevrolet Sports Car Classic	2015 season	Next race: SportsCar Grand Prix
