= 2017 Mobil 1 SportsCar Grand Prix =

Sports car race

The Canadian Tire Motorsports Park

The 2017 Mobil 1 SportsCar Grand Prix was a sports car race sanctioned by the International Motor Sports Association (IMSA). The race was held at Canadian Tire Motorsports Park in Bowmanville, Ontario, Canada on July 9, 2017. The race was the seventh round of the 2017 IMSA SportsCar Championship.

== Background ==
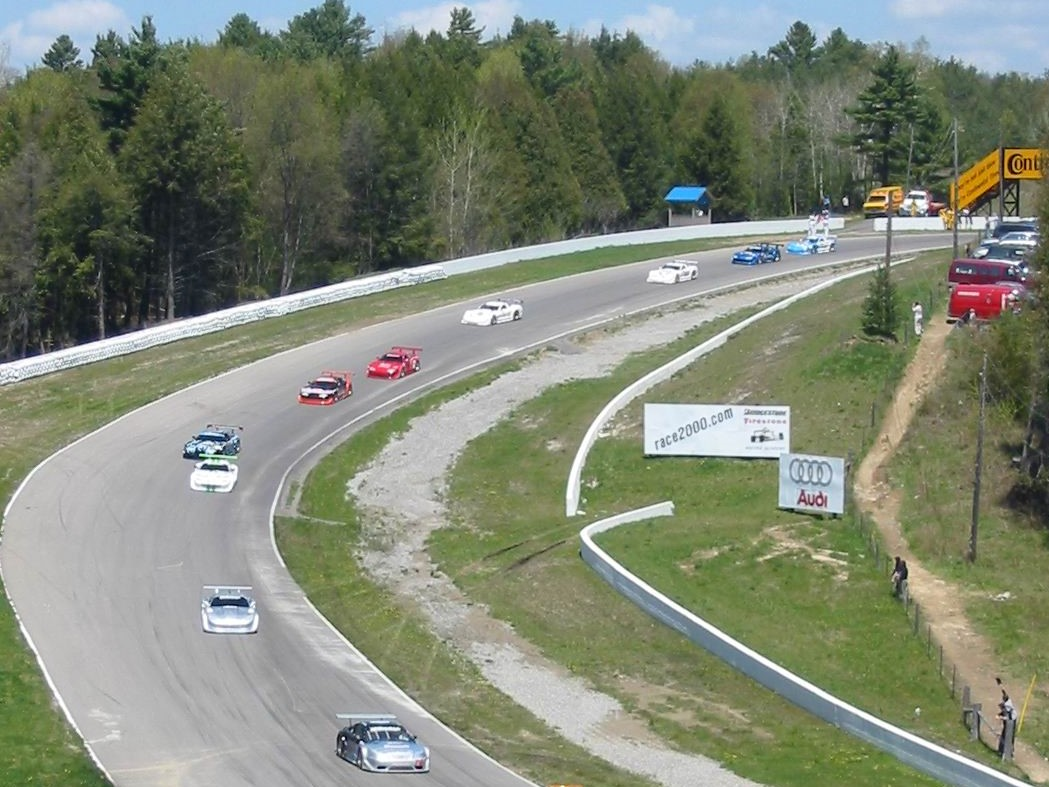
Canadian Tire Motorsports Park, where the race was held.

IMSA's president Scott Atherton confirmed the Mobil 1 SportsCar Grand Prix was part of the series' schedule for the 2017 IMSA SportsCar Championship at Road America's victory lane in August 2016. It was the fourth consecutive year the event was held as part of the WeatherTech SportsCar Championship and the thirty-sixth annual running of the race. The 2017 Mobil 1 SportsCar Grand Prix was the seventh of twelve scheduled sports car races of 2017 by IMSA, and was the fourth round not held on the held as part of the North American Endurance Cup. The race was held at the ten-turn 2.459 mi (3.957 km) Canadian Tire Motorsports Park in Bowmanville, Ontario, Canada on July 9, 2017. After the Sahlen's Six Hours of the Glen one week earlier, Jordan Taylor and Ricky Taylor led the Prototype Drivers' Championship with 202 points, ahead of João Barbosa and Christian Fittipaldi with 182 points, and Misha Goikhberg and Stephen Simpson with 167 points. With 180 points, the PC Drivers' Championship was led by James French and Patricio O'Ward with a thirty-point advantage over Don Yount. Antonio García and Jan Magnussen led the GTLM Drivers' Championship with 154 points, ahead of Joey Hand and Dirk Müller with 146 points. In GTD, the Drivers' Championship was led by Alessandro Balzan and Christina Nielsen with 173 points, ahead of Ben Keating and Jeroen Bleekemolen with 171 points. Cadillac, Chevrolet, and Mercedes-AMG were leading their respective Manufacturers' Championships, while Wayne Taylor Racing, Performance Tech Motorsports, Corvette Racing, and Scuderia Corsa each led their own Teams' Championships.

== Entries ==
A total of 36 cars took part in the event split across 4 classes. 10 cars were entered in P, 3 in PC, 8 in GTLM, and 15 in GTD. In P, David Ostella and Nicholas Boulle replaced José Gutiérrez and Olivier Pla in the PR1/Mathiasen Motorsports entry. Pipo Derani joined Johannes van Overbeek in the #22 Tequila Patrón ESM. In PC, Ryan Lewis joined Don Yount in the #20 BAR1 Motorsports entry. Garett Grist and James Vance shared the #26 BAR1 Motorsports entry. In GTD, Alex Job Racing and Dream Racing Motorsport skipped the event. Jörg Bergmeister returned to the Park Place Motorsports entry after missing the previous round at Watkins Glen due to a family emergency. Bret Curtis returned to the Turner Motorsport entry.

== Practice ==
There were three practice sessions preceding the start of the race on Saturday, two on Friday and one on Saturday. The first two one-hour sessions were on Friday morning and afternoon. The third on Saturday morning lasted an hour.

=== Practice 1 ===
The first practice session took place at 11:20 am ET on Friday and ended with Jordan Taylor topping the charts for Wayne Taylor Racing, with a lap time of 1:09.443. The PC class was topped by the #38 Performance Tech Motorsports Oreca FLM09 of Patricio O'Ward with a time of 1:12.512. Laurens Vanthoor was fastest in GTLM while Andy Lally set the fastest time in GTD.

Pos.	Class	No.	Team	Driver	Time	Gap
1	P	10	Wayne Taylor Racing	Jordan Taylor	1:09.443	_
2	P	2	Tequila Patrón ESM	Ryan Dalziel	1:09.450	+0.007
3	P	55	Mazda Motorsports	Jonathan Bomarito	1:09.741	+0.298

=== Practice 2 ===
The second practice session took place at 3:55 pm ET on Friday and ended with Ryan Dalziel topping the charts for Tequila Patrón ESM, with a lap time of 1:08.994. James French set the fastest time in PC. The GTLM class was topped by the #912 Porsche GT Team Porsche 911 RSR of Laurens Vanthoor with a time of 1:14.753. Patrick Pilet was second in the sister #911 car and John Edwards rounded out the top 3. Sage Karam was fastest in GTD.

Pos.	Class	No.	Team	Driver	Time	Gap
1	P	2	Tequila Patrón ESM	Ryan Dalziel	1:08.994	_
2	P	10	Wayne Taylor Racing	Ricky Taylor	1:09.053	+0.059
3	P	22	Tequila Patrón ESM	Pipo Derani	1:09.093	+0.099

=== Practice 3 ===
The third and final practice session took place at 9:20 am ET on Saturday and ended with Stephen Simpson topping the charts for JDC-Miller MotorSports, with a lap time of 1:09.142. Patricio O'Ward set the fastest time PC by 1.678 seconds ahead of Ryan Lewis in the #20 BAR1 Motorsports entry. The GTLM class was topped by the #911 Porsche GT Team Porsche 911 RSR of Dirk Werner with a time of 1:14.799. Tristan Vautier was fastest in GTD. The session was red flagged two times. 20 minutes into the session, the #15 3GT Racing Lexus RC F GT3 of Jack Hawksworth crashed at turn 3 after going wide, and dipped into the grass launching the car into the tire barriers before becoming airborne. The car suffered heavy damage to the front, but Hawksworth was uninjured and exited his car without external aid. The final stoppage came for debris on the track.

Pos.	Class	No.	Team	Driver	Time	Gap
1	P	85	JDC-Miller MotorSports	Stephen Simpson	1:09.142	_
2	P	10	Wayne Taylor Racing	Jordan Taylor	1:09.195	+0.053
3	P	22	Tequila Patrón ESM	Pipo Derani	1:09.374	+0.232

== Qualifying ==
In Saturday afternoon's 90-minute four-group qualifying, each category had separate 15-minute sessions. Regulations stipulated that teams nominate one qualifying driver, with the fastest laps determining each class' starting order. IMSA arranged the grid to put Prototypes ahead of the PC, GTLM and GTD cars.

The first was for cars in GTD class. Sage Karam qualified on pole for the class driving the #14 3GT Racing entry, besting Andrew Davis in the #57 Stevenson Motorsports entry.

The second session of qualifying was for cars in the GTLM class. Dirk Werner qualified on pole driving the #911 car for Porsche GT Team, beating Bill Auberlen in the #25 BMW Team RLL entry by less than one tenth of a second.

The third session of qualifying was for cars in the PC class. James French set the fastest time driving the #38 Performance Tech Motorsports entry.

The final session of qualifying was for the P class. Ricky Taylor qualified on pole driving the #10 car for Wayne Taylor Racing, besting Mikhail Goikhberg in the #85 entry from JDC-Miller MotorSports.

=== Qualifying results ===
Pole positions in each class are indicated in bold and by ‡.

Pos.	Class	No.	Team	Driver	Time	Gap	Grid
1	**P**	**10**	**(United States) Wayne Taylor Racing**	**(United States) Ricky Taylor**	**1:08.459**	**_**	1‡
2	P	85	(United States) JDC-Miller MotorSports	(Canada) Mikhail Goikhberg	1:08.587	+0.128	2
3	P	2	(United States) Tequila Patrón ESM	(United States) Scott Sharp	1:08.886	+0.427	3
4	P	22	(United States) Tequila Patrón ESM	(United States) Johannes van Overbeek	1:08.934	+0.475	4
5	P	55	(Japan) Mazda Motorsports	(United States) Jonathan Bomarito	1:08.959	+0.500	5
6	P	5	(United States) Mustang Sampling Racing	(Brazil) Christian Fittipaldi	1:09.173	+0.714	6
7	P	90	(United States) VisitFlorida Racing	(Belgium) Marc Goossens	1:09.286	+0.827	7
8	P	31	(United States) Whelen Engineering Racing	(United States) Eric Curran	1:09.895	+1.436	8
9	P	52	(United States) PR1/Mathiasen Motorsports	(United States) Nicholas Boulle	1:09.958	+1.499	9
10	P	70	(Japan) Mazda Motorsports	(United States) Tom Long	1:09.959	+1.500	10
11	**PC**	**38**	**(United States)** Performance Tech Motorsports	**(United States)** James French	**1:11.471**	**+3.012**	11‡
12	PC	26	(United States) BAR1 Motorsports	(Canada) Garett Grist	1:13.193	+4.734	12
13	PC	20	(United States) BAR1 Motorsports	(United States) Don Yount	1:13.821	+5.362	13
14	**GTLM**	**911**	**(United States) Porsche GT Team**	**(Germany) Dirk Werner**	**1:14.085**	**+5.626**	14‡
15	GTLM	25	(United States) BMW Team RLL	(United States) Bill Auberlen	1:14.103	+5.644	15
16	GTLM	912	(United States) Porsche GT Team	(Belgium) Laurens Vanthoor	1:14.251	+5.792	16
17	GTLM	24	(United States) BMW Team RLL	(Germany) Martin Tomczyk	1:14.294	+5.835	17
18	GTLM	67	(United States) Ford Chip Ganassi Racing	(Australia) Ryan Briscoe	1:14.434	+5.975	18
19	GTLM	66	(United States) Ford Chip Ganassi Racing	(United States) Joey Hand	1:14.732	+6.273	19
20	GTLM	3	(United States) Corvette Racing	(Denmark) Jan Magnussen	1:14.844	+6.385	20
21	GTLM	4	(United States) Corvette Racing	(United Kingdom) Oliver Gavin	1:14.904	+6.445	21
22	**GTD**	**14**	**(United States) 3GT Racing**	**(United States) Sage Karam**	**1:16.563**	**+8.104**	22‡
23	GTD	57	(United States) Stevenson Motorsports	(United States) Andrew Davis	1:16.828	+8.266	23
24	GTD	86	(United States) Michael Shank Racing with Curb-Agajanian	(United States) Jeff Segal	1:17.106	+8.369	24
25	GTD	48	(United States) Paul Miller Racing	(United States) Bryan Sellers	1:17.149	+8.647	25
26	GTD	63	(United States) Scuderia Corsa	(Denmark) Christina Nielsen	1:17.149	+8.690	26
27	GTD	93	(United States) Michael Shank Racing with Curb-Agajanian	(United Kingdom) Katherine Legge	1:17.265	+8.806	27
28	GTD	16	(United States) Change Racing	(United States) Corey Lewis	1:17.281	+8.822	28
29	GTD	96	(United States) Turner Motorsport	(United States) Bret Curtis	1:17.524	+9.065	29
30	GTD	73	(United States) Park Place Motorsports	(United States) Patrick Lindsey	1:17.672	+9.213	30
31	GTD	75	(Australia) SunEnergy1 Racing	(Australia) Kenny Habul	1:17.817	+9.358	31
32	GTD	50	(United States) Riley Motorsports – WeatherTech Racing	(United States) Cooper MacNeil	1:17.959	+9.500	32
33	GTD	33	(United States) Riley Motorsports – Team AMG	(United States) Ben Keating	1:18.073	+9.614	33
34	GTD	28	(United States) Alegra Motorsports	(United States) Michael de Quesada	1:18.085	+9.626	34
35	GTD	54	(United States) CORE Autosport	(United States) Jon Bennett	1:19.220	+10.761	36^{1}
36	GTD	15	(United States) 3GT Racing	Did Not Participate			35^{2}
Sources:

- ^{1} The No. 54 CORE Autosport entry was moved to the back of the GTD field entry was moved to the back of the GTD field as per Article 43.6 of the Sporting regulations (Change of starting tires).
- ^{2} The No. 15 3GT Racing entry was moved to the back of the GTD field as per Article 43.5 of the Sporting regulations (Change of starting driver).

== Race ==
=== Post-race ===
The result kept Jordan Taylor and Ricky Taylor atop the Prototype Drivers' Championship with 226 points, 19 points ahead of fifth-place finishers Barbosa and Fittipaldi. In the PC Drivers' Championship, French and O'Ward extended their points lead to thirty-two points over Yount. In the GTLM Drivers' Championship, Auberlen and Sims advanced from third to second. The result kept Balzan and Nielsen atop the GTD Drivers' Championship while Aschenbach and Davis advanced from seventh to fifth. Cadillac, and Chevrolet continued to top their respective Manufacturers' Championships. Ferrari took the lead of the GTD Manufacturers' Championship while Wayne Taylor Racing, Performance Tech Motorsports, Corvette Racing, and Scuderia Corsa kept their respective advantages in the Teams' Championships with five rounds left in the season.

=== Results ===
Class winners are denoted in bold and ‡.

Final race classification
Pos	Class	No.	Team	Drivers	Chassis	Tire	Laps	Time/Retired
Pos	Class	No.	Team	Drivers	Engine	Tire	Laps	Time/Retired
1	**P**	**31**	**(United States) Whelen Engineering Racing**	**(United States) Dane Cameron (United States) Eric Curran**	**Cadillac DPi-V.R**	C	**122**	**2:41:14.508‡**
1	**P**	**31**	**(United States) Whelen Engineering Racing**	**(United States) Dane Cameron (United States) Eric Curran**	**Cadillac 6.2 L V8**	C	**122**	**2:41:14.508‡**
2	P	85	(United States) JDC-Miller MotorSports	(Canada) Mikhail Goikhberg (South Africa) Stephen Simpson	Oreca 07	C	122	+8.295
2	P	85	(United States) JDC-Miller MotorSports	(Canada) Mikhail Goikhberg (South Africa) Stephen Simpson	Gibson GK428 4.2 L V8	C	122	+8.295
3	P	2	(United States) Tequila Patrón ESM	(United States) Scott Sharp (United Kingdom) Ryan Dalziel	Nissan Onroak DPi	C	122	+12.420
3	P	2	(United States) Tequila Patrón ESM	(United States) Scott Sharp (United Kingdom) Ryan Dalziel	Nissan VR38DETT 3.8 L Turbo V6	C	122	+12.420
4	P	55	(Japan) Mazda Motorsports	(United States) Tristan Nunez (United States) Jonathan Bomarito	Mazda RT24-P	C	122	+13.234
4	P	55	(Japan) Mazda Motorsports	(United States) Tristan Nunez (United States) Jonathan Bomarito	Mazda MZ-2.0T 2.0 L Turbo I4	C	122	+13.234
5	P	70	(Japan) Mazda Motorsports	(United States) Tom Long (United States) Joel Miller	Mazda RT24-P	C	122	+14.716
5	P	70	(Japan) Mazda Motorsports	(United States) Tom Long (United States) Joel Miller	Mazda MZ-2.0T 2.0 L Turbo I4	C	122	+14.716
6	P	5	(United States) Mustang Sampling Racing	(Portugal) João Barbosa (Brazil) Christian Fittipaldi	Cadillac DPi-V.R	C	122	+21.083
6	P	5	(United States) Mustang Sampling Racing	(Portugal) João Barbosa (Brazil) Christian Fittipaldi	Cadillac 6.2 L V8	C	122	+21.083
7	P	10	(United States) Wayne Taylor Racing	(United States) Ricky Taylor (United States) Jordan Taylor	Cadillac DPi-V.R	C	120	+2 Laps
7	P	10	(United States) Wayne Taylor Racing	(United States) Ricky Taylor (United States) Jordan Taylor	Cadillac 6.2 L V8	C	120	+2 Laps
8	**PC**	**38**	**(United States) Performance Tech Motorsports**	**(United States) James French (Mexico) Patricio O'Ward**	**Oreca FLM09**	C	**117**	**+5 Laps‡**
8	**PC**	**38**	**(United States) Performance Tech Motorsports**	**(United States) James French (Mexico) Patricio O'Ward**	**Chevrolet 6.2 L V8**	C	**117**	**+5 Laps‡**
9	**GTLM**	**25**	**(United States) BMW Team RLL**	**(United States) Bill Auberlen (United Kingdom) Alexander Sims**	**BMW M6 GTLM**	MI	**117**	**+5 Laps‡**
9	**GTLM**	**25**	**(United States) BMW Team RLL**	**(United States) Bill Auberlen (United Kingdom) Alexander Sims**	**BMW 4.4 L Turbo V8**	MI	**117**	**+5 Laps‡**
10	GTLM	24	(United States) BMW Team RLL	(United States) John Edwards (Germany) Martin Tomczyk	BMW M6 GTLM	MI	117	+5 Laps
10	GTLM	24	(United States) BMW Team RLL	(United States) John Edwards (Germany) Martin Tomczyk	BMW 4.4 L Turbo V8	MI	117	+5 Laps
11	GTLM	67	(United States) Ford Chip Ganassi Racing	(Australia) Ryan Briscoe (United Kingdom) Richard Westbrook	Ford GT	MI	117	+5 Laps
11	GTLM	67	(United States) Ford Chip Ganassi Racing	(Australia) Ryan Briscoe (United Kingdom) Richard Westbrook	Ford EcoBoost 3.5 L Twin-turbo V6	MI	117	+5 Laps
12	GTLM	3	(United States) Corvette Racing	(Denmark) Jan Magnussen (Spain) Antonio García	Chevrolet Corvette C7.R	MI	117	+5 Laps
12	GTLM	3	(United States) Corvette Racing	(Denmark) Jan Magnussen (Spain) Antonio García	Chevrolet LT5.5 5.5 L V8	MI	117	+5 Laps
13	GTLM	66	(United States) Ford Chip Ganassi Racing	(Germany) Dirk Müller (United States) Joey Hand	Ford GT	MI	117	+5 Laps
13	GTLM	66	(United States) Ford Chip Ganassi Racing	(Germany) Dirk Müller (United States) Joey Hand	Ford EcoBoost 3.5 L Twin-turbo V6	MI	117	+5 Laps
14	GTLM	912	(United States) Porsche GT Team	(Italy) Gianmaria Bruni (Belgium) Laurens Vanthoor	Porsche 911 RSR	MI	117	+5 Laps
14	GTLM	912	(United States) Porsche GT Team	(Italy) Gianmaria Bruni (Belgium) Laurens Vanthoor	Porsche 4.0 L Flat-6	MI	117	+5 Laps
15	P	52	(United States) PR1/Mathiasen Motorsports	(United States) Nicholas Boulle (Canada) David Ostella	Ligier JS P217	C	116	Crash
15	P	52	(United States) PR1/Mathiasen Motorsports	(United States) Nicholas Boulle (Canada) David Ostella	Gibson GK428 4.2 L V8	C	116	Crash
16	PC	20	(United States) BAR1 Motorsports	(United States) Don Yount (United Kingdom) Ryan Lewis	Oreca FLM09	C	116	+6 Laps
16	PC	20	(United States) BAR1 Motorsports	(United States) Don Yount (United Kingdom) Ryan Lewis	Chevrolet 6.2 L V8	C	116	+6 Laps
17	**GTD**	**57**	**(United States) Stevenson Motorsports**	**(United States) Andrew Davis (United States) Lawson Aschenbach**	**Audi R8 LMS**	C	**114**	**+8 Laps‡**
17	**GTD**	**57**	**(United States) Stevenson Motorsports**	**(United States) Andrew Davis (United States) Lawson Aschenbach**	**Audi 5.2L V10**	C	**114**	**+8 Laps‡**
18	GTD	93	(United States) Michael Shank Racing with Curb Agajanian	(United States) Andy Lally (United Kingdom) Katherine Legge	Acura NSX GT3	C	114	+8 Laps
18	GTD	93	(United States) Michael Shank Racing with Curb Agajanian	(United States) Andy Lally (United Kingdom) Katherine Legge	Acura 3.5 L Turbo V6	C	114	+8 Laps
19	GTD	63	(United States) Scuderia Corsa	(Denmark) Christina Nielsen (Italy) Alessandro Balzan	Ferrari 488 GT3	C	114	+8 Laps
19	GTD	63	(United States) Scuderia Corsa	(Denmark) Christina Nielsen (Italy) Alessandro Balzan	Ferrari F154CB 3.9 L Turbo V8	C	114	+8 Laps
20	GTD	96	(United States) Turner Motorsport	(Germany) Jens Klingmann (United States) Bret Curtis	BMW M6 GT3	C	114	+8 Laps
20	GTD	96	(United States) Turner Motorsport	(Germany) Jens Klingmann (United States) Bret Curtis	BMW 4.4L Turbo V8	C	114	+8 Laps
21	GTD	14	(United States) 3GT Racing	(United States) Scott Pruett (United States) Sage Karam	Lexus RC F GT3	C	114	+8 Laps
21	GTD	14	(United States) 3GT Racing	(United States) Scott Pruett (United States) Sage Karam	Lexus 5.0L V8	C	114	+8 Laps
22	GTD	16	(United States) Change Racing	(United States) Corey Lewis (Netherlands) Jeroen Mul	Lamborghini Huracán GT3	C	114	+8 Laps
22	GTD	16	(United States) Change Racing	(United States) Corey Lewis (Netherlands) Jeroen Mul	Lamborghini 5.2 L V10	C	114	+8 Laps
23	GTD	33	(United States) Riley Motorsports – Team AMG	(Netherlands) Jeroen Bleekemolen (United States) Ben Keating	Mercedes-AMG GT3	C	114	+8 Laps
23	GTD	33	(United States) Riley Motorsports – Team AMG	(Netherlands) Jeroen Bleekemolen (United States) Ben Keating	Mercedes AMG M159 6.2 L V8	C	114	+8 Laps
24	GTD	48	(United States) Paul Miller Racing	(United States) Bryan Sellers (United States) Madison Snow	Lamborghini Huracán GT3	C	113	+9 Laps
24	GTD	48	(United States) Paul Miller Racing	(United States) Bryan Sellers (United States) Madison Snow	Lamborghini 5.2 L V10	C	113	+9 Laps
25	GTD	73	(United States) Park Place Motorsports	(Germany) Jörg Bergmeister (United States) Patrick Lindsey	Porsche 911 GT3 R	C	113	+9 Laps
25	GTD	73	(United States) Park Place Motorsports	(Germany) Jörg Bergmeister (United States) Patrick Lindsey	Porsche 4.0 L Flat-6	C	113	+9 Laps
26	GTD	86	(United States) Michael Shank Racing with Curb Agajanian	(United States) Jeff Segal (Brazil) Oswaldo Negri Jr.	Acura NSX GT3	C	113	+9 Laps
26	GTD	86	(United States) Michael Shank Racing with Curb Agajanian	(United States) Jeff Segal (Brazil) Oswaldo Negri Jr.	Acura 3.5 L Turbo V6	C	113	+9 Laps
27	GTD	50	(United States) Riley Motorsports – WeatherTech Racing	(United States) Cooper MacNeil (United States) Gunnar Jeannette	Mercedes-AMG GT3	C	113	+9 Laps
27	GTD	50	(United States) Riley Motorsports – WeatherTech Racing	(United States) Cooper MacNeil (United States) Gunnar Jeannette	Mercedes AMG M159 6.2 L V8	C	113	+9 Laps
28	PC	26	(United States) BAR1 Motorsports	(Canada) Garett Grist (Canada) James Vance	Oreca FLM09	C	113	+9 Laps
28	PC	26	(United States) BAR1 Motorsports	(Canada) Garett Grist (Canada) James Vance	Chevrolet 6.2 L V8	C	113	+9 Laps
29	GTD	15	(United States) 3GT Racing	(United States) Robert Alon (United Kingdom) Jack Hawksworth	Lexus RC F GT3	C	63	+10 Laps
29	GTD	15	(United States) 3GT Racing	(United States) Robert Alon (United Kingdom) Jack Hawksworth	Lexus 5.0L V8	C	63	+10 Laps
30	GTD	75	(United States) SunEnergy1 Racing	(France) Tristan Vautier (Australia) Kenny Habul	Mercedes-AMG GT3	C	112	+10 Laps
30	GTD	75	(United States) SunEnergy1 Racing	(France) Tristan Vautier (Australia) Kenny Habul	Mercedes AMG M159 6.2 L V8	C	112	+10 Laps
31	GTD	54	(United States) CORE Autosport	(United States) Jon Bennett (United States) Colin Braun	Porsche 911 GT3 R	C	112	+10 Laps
31	GTD	54	(United States) CORE Autosport	(United States) Jon Bennett (United States) Colin Braun	Porsche 4.0 L Flat-6	C	112	+10 Laps
32	GTD	28	(United States) Alegra Motorsports	(United States) Michael de Quesada (Canada) Daniel Morad	Porsche 911 GT3 R	C	112	+10 Laps
32	GTD	28	(United States) Alegra Motorsports	(United States) Michael de Quesada (Canada) Daniel Morad	Porsche 4.0 L Flat-6	C	112	+10 Laps
33	GTLM	911	(United States) Porsche GT Team	(France) Patrick Pilet (Germany) Dirk Werner	Porsche 911 RSR	MI	109	+13 Laps
33	GTLM	911	(United States) Porsche GT Team	(France) Patrick Pilet (Germany) Dirk Werner	Porsche 4.0 L Flat-6	MI	109	+13 Laps
34 DNF	GTLM	4	(United States) Corvette Racing	(United Kingdom) Oliver Gavin (United States) Tommy Milner	Chevrolet Corvette C7.R	MI	102	Crash
34 DNF	GTLM	4	(United States) Corvette Racing	(United Kingdom) Oliver Gavin (United States) Tommy Milner	Chevrolet LT5.5 5.5 L V8	MI	102	Crash
35 DNF	P	22	(United States) Tequila Patrón ESM	(United States) Johannes van Overbeek (Brazil) Pipo Derani	Nissan Onroak DPi	C	89	Fire
35 DNF	P	22	(United States) Tequila Patrón ESM	(United States) Johannes van Overbeek (Brazil) Pipo Derani	Nissan VR38DETT 3.8 L Turbo V6	C	89	Fire
36 DNF	P	90	(United States) VisitFlorida Racing	(Belgium) Marc Goossens (Netherlands) Renger van der Zande	Riley Mk. 30	C	35	Electrical
36 DNF	P	90	(United States) VisitFlorida Racing	(Belgium) Marc Goossens (Netherlands) Renger van der Zande	Gibson GK428 4.2 L V8	C	35	Electrical

Tyre manufacturers
Key
Symbol	Tyre manufacturer
**C**	Continental
**MI**	Michelin

== Standings after the race ==
Prototype Drivers' Championship standings
Pos.	+/–	Driver	Points
1		(United States) Jordan Taylor (United States) Ricky Taylor	226
2		(Portugal) João Barbosa (Brazil) Christian Fittipaldi	207
3		(Canada) Misha Goikhberg (South Africa) Stephen Simpson	200
4		(United States) Dane Cameron (United States) Eric Curran	199
5		(United Kingdom) Ryan Dalziel (United States) Scott Sharp	183

PC Drivers' Championship standings
Pos.	+/–	Driver	Points
1		(United States) James French (Mexico) Patricio O'Ward	216
2		(United States) Don Yount	182
3		(United States) Buddy Rice	120
4		(United States) Kyle Masson	108
5		(Colombia) Gustavo Yacamán	89

GTLM Drivers' Championship standings
Pos.	+/–	Driver	Points
1		(Spain) Antonio García (Denmark) Jan Magnussen	182
2	1	(United States) Bill Auberlen (United Kingdom) Alexander Sims	179
3	1	(United States) Joey Hand (Germany) Dirk Müller	172
4		(Australia) Ryan Briscoe (United Kingdom) Richard Westbrook	169
5		(France) Patrick Pilet (Germany) Dirk Werner	159

GTD Drivers' Championship standings
Pos.	+/–	Driver	Points
1		(Italy) Alessandro Balzan (Denmark) Christina Nielsen	203
2		(Netherlands) Jeroen Bleekemolen (United States) Ben Keating	195
3		(United States) Andy Lally (United Kingdom) Katherine Legge	179
4	2	(Germany) Jens Klingmann	168
5	2	(United States) Lawson Aschenbach (United States) Andrew Davis	166

- Note: Only the top five positions are included for all sets of standings.

Prototype Teams' Championship standings
Pos.	+/–	Team	Points
1		(United States) #10 Wayne Taylor Racing	226
2		(United States) #5 Mustang Sampling Racing	207
3		(United States) #85 JDC-Miller MotorSports	200
4		(United States) #31 Whelen Engineering Racing	199
5		(United States) #2 Tequila Patrón ESM	183

PC Teams' Championship standings
Pos.	+/–	Team	Points
1		(United States) #38 Performance Tech Motorsports	216
2		(United States) #26 BAR1 Motorsports	185
3		(United States) #20 BAR1 Motorsports	182
4		(United States) #8 Starworks Motorsport	58
5		(United States) #88 Starworks Motorsport	28

GTLM Teams' Championship standings
Pos.	+/–	Team	Points
1		(United States) #3 Corvette Racing	182
2	1	(United States) #25 BMW Team RLL	179
3	1	(United States) #66 Ford Chip Ganassi Racing	172
4		(United States) #67 Ford Chip Ganassi Racing	169
5		(United States) #911 Porsche GT Team	159

GTD Teams' Championship standings
Pos.	+/–	Team	Points
1		(United States) #63 Scuderia Corsa	203
2		(United States) #33 Riley Motorsports Team AMG	195
3		(United States) #93 Michael Shank Racing with Curb-Agajanian	179
4	2	(United States) #96 Turner Motorsport	168
5	2	(United States) #57 Stevenson Motorsports	166

- Note: Only the top five positions are included for all sets of standings.

Prototype Manufacturers' Championship standings
Pos.	+/–	Manufacturer	Points
1		(United States) Cadillac	245
2		(Japan) Nissan	218
3		(Japan) Mazda	216

GTLM Manufacturers' Championship standings
Pos.	+/–	Manufacturer	Points
1		(United States) Chevrolet	193
2		(United States) Ford	191
3		(Germany) BMW	184
4		(Germany) Porsche	174
5		(Italy) Ferrari	112

GTD Manufacturers' Championship standing
Pos.	+/–	Manufacturer	Points
1	1	(Italy) Ferrari	212
2	1	(Germany) Mercedes-AMG	211
3		(Japan) Acura	204
4	3	(Germany) Audi	192
5	1	(Germany) Porsche	190

- Note: Only the top five positions are included for all sets of standings.

IMSA SportsCar Championship
Previous race: 6 Hours of The Glen	2017 season	Next race: Northeast Grand Prix
