= Jon Bennett (racing driver) =

American racing driver (born 1965)

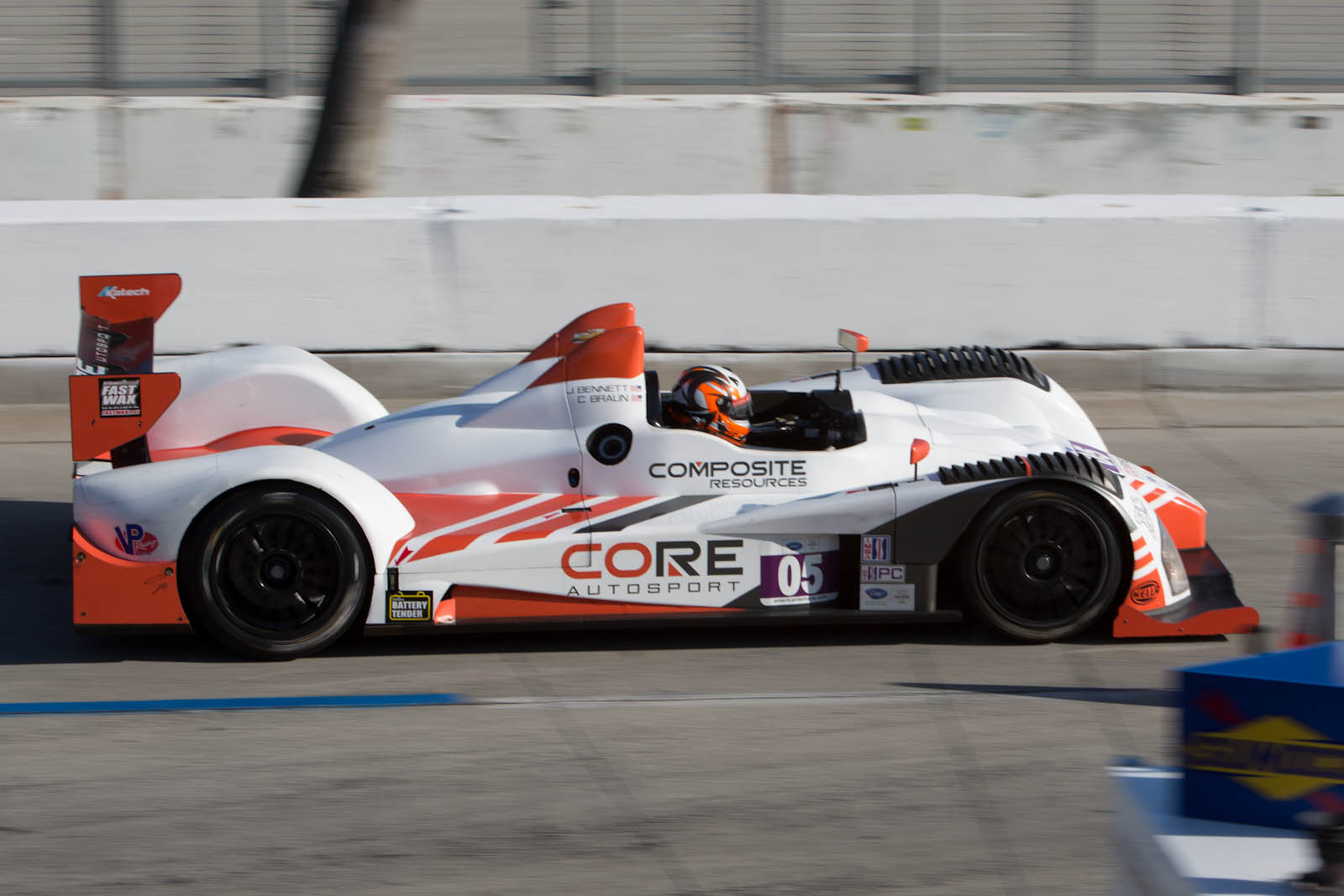
- Nationality: (United States) American
- Born: Jonathan Bennett; May 4, 1965 (age 61) Fort Knox, Kentucky, United States
- Categorisation: FIA Bronze (until 2012, 2018–); FIA Silver (2013–2017)

Jonathan Bennett (born May 4, 1965) is an American racing driver with residence in Charlotte, North Carolina. Bennett competed in the WeatherTech SportsCar Championship for his own team, CORE Autosport, which disbanded in 2022.

== Racing career ==
Bennett competed for CORE Autosport in 2014, in the new United SportsCar Championship, driving the No. 54 PC car with Colin Braun. He and co-drivers Braun, James Gué and Mark Wilkins won the season-opening Rolex 24 at Daytona in the PC class followed by the 12 Hours of Sebring. Bennett and Braun went on to win races at Kansas Speedway and Watkins Glen International, propelling them to the 2014 PC Drivers' Championship and PC Team Championship as well as the newly created Tequila Patrón North American Endurance Cup. Bennett and Braun's success continued into 2015, where once again they claimed the PC Driver Championship in conjunction with CORE's PC Team Championship.

Bennett continued to drive for CORE Autosport with Braun in the IMSA WeatherTech SportsCar Championship PC class in 2016.

== Racing record ==
=== Career summary ===
Season	Series	Team	Races	Wins	Podiums	Points	Position
2007	SCCA Southeast Division National - Spec Racer Ford		7	0	1	31	8th
2008	SCCA Southeast Division National - Formula Enterprises		5	1	2	33	6th
2008	SARRC - Formula Enterprises		2	1	2	44	9th
2008	SCCA National Championship Runoffs - Formula Enterprises	Inspire Racing	1	0	0	0	-
2009	SCCA Southeast Division National - Formula Enterprises		8	1	4	40	4th
2009	SCCA Nationwide - Formula Enterprises		6	1	4	69	13th
2009	IMSA Prototype Lites - Lites 1		6	0	0	34	15th
2009	SCCA Chicago Region June Sprints - Formula Enterprises		1	0	0	0	10th
2010	IMSA Prototype Lites - Lites 1	Inspire Motorsports w/ CORE Autosport	15	0	2	133	6th
2010	SCCA Southeast Division National - Formula Enterprises		2	0	2	18	6th
2011	American Le Mans Series - LMPC	CORE Autosport	9	0	4	130	2nd
2012	American Le Mans Series - LMPC	CORE Autosport	10	4	7	150	2nd
2013	American Le Mans Series - Prototype Challenge	CORE Autosport	10	2	8	136	3rd
2013	IMSA GT3 Challenge by Yokohama - Platinum Cup	CORE Autosport	8	0	0	28	16th
2014	United Sports Car Championship - Prototype Challenge	CORE Autosport	10	4	8	321	1st
2015	United Sports Car Championship - Prototype Challenge	CORE Autosport	10	2	6	318	1st
2016	IMSA SportsCar Championship - Prototype Challenge	CORE Autosport	9	2	5	245	7th
2017	IMSA Sportscar Championship - GTD	CORE Autosport	11	0	0	231	18th
2018	IMSA Sportscar Championship - Prototype	CORE Autosport	10	2	5	274	2nd
2018	Michelin Le Mans Cup - LMP3	M. Racing - YMR	2	0	0	1	42nd
2019	IMSA Sportscar Championship - DPI	CORE Autosport	10	0	0	230	10th
2021	IMSA SportsCar Championship - LMP3	CORE Autosport	8	2	5	1990	2nd
2022	IMSA SportsCar Championship - LMP3	CORE Autosport	7	2	5	2002	1st
2022	IMSA Prototype Challenge	CrowdStrike Racing by D Motorsports	1	0	0	120	43rd
2022	IMSA Prototype Challenge	CORE Autosport	0	0	0	120	43rd

== Motorsports career results ==
=== WeatherTech SportsCar Championship results ===
(key)(Races in bold indicate pole position. Races in italics indicate fastest race lap in class. Results are overall/class)

Year	Team	Class	Make	Engine	1	2	3	4	5	6	7	8	9	10	11	12	Rank	Points	Ref
2014	CORE Autosport	PC	Oreca FLM09	Chevrolet LS3 6.2 L V8	DAY; 1	SIR; 1	LGA; 7	KAN; 1	WGI; 1	IMS; 3	ELK; 8	VIR; 3	AUS; 2	ATL; 2			**1st**	**321**	
2015	CORE Autosport	PC	Oreca FLM09	Chevrolet LS3 6.2 L V8	DAY; 2	SEB; 2	LGA; 2	DET; 4	WGI; 4	MOS; 1	LRP; 4	ELK; 3	AUS; 1	ATL; 4			**1st**	**318**	
2016	CORE Autosport	PC	Oreca FLM09	Chevrolet LS3 6.2 L V8	DAY; 8	SIR; 1	LBC; 7	LGA; 3	DET; 2	WGI; 6	MOS; 1	LRP; 8	ELK; 2	AUS	ATL		7th	245	
2017	CORE Autosport	GTD	Porsche 911 GT3 R	Porsche 4.0 L Flat-6	DAY; 22	SEB; 16	LBH; 14	COA; 14	DET; 8	WGL; 13	MOS; 14	LIM; 17	ELK; 7	VIR; 8	LGA; 4	PET; 5	18th	231	
2018	CORE Autosport	P	Oreca 07	Gibson GK428 4.2 L V8	DAY; 3	SEB; 4	LBH; 10	MDO; 13	DET; 12	WGL; 2	MOS; 1	ELK; 1	LGA; 2	PET; 7			2nd	274	
2019	CORE Autosport	DPi	Nissan Onroak DPi	Nissan VR38DETT 3.8 L Turbo V6	DAY; 4	SEB; 5	LBH; 11	MOH; 11	BEL; 7	WGL; 11	MOS; 7	ELK; 10	LGA; 7	ATL; 8			10th	230	
2021	CORE Autosport	LMP3	Ligier JS P320	Nissan VK56DE 5.6L V8	DAY; 5	SEB; 1	MOH; 4	WGL; 2	WGL; 3	ELK; 1	ATL; 7						2nd	1990	
2022	CORE Autosport	LMP3	Ligier JS P320	Nissan VK56DE 5.6 L V8	DAY; 3	SEB; 5	MDO; 1	WGL; 2	MOS; 1	ELK; 3	PET; 5						1st	2002	
