= CORE Autosport =

American auto racing team

(United States) CORE Autosport
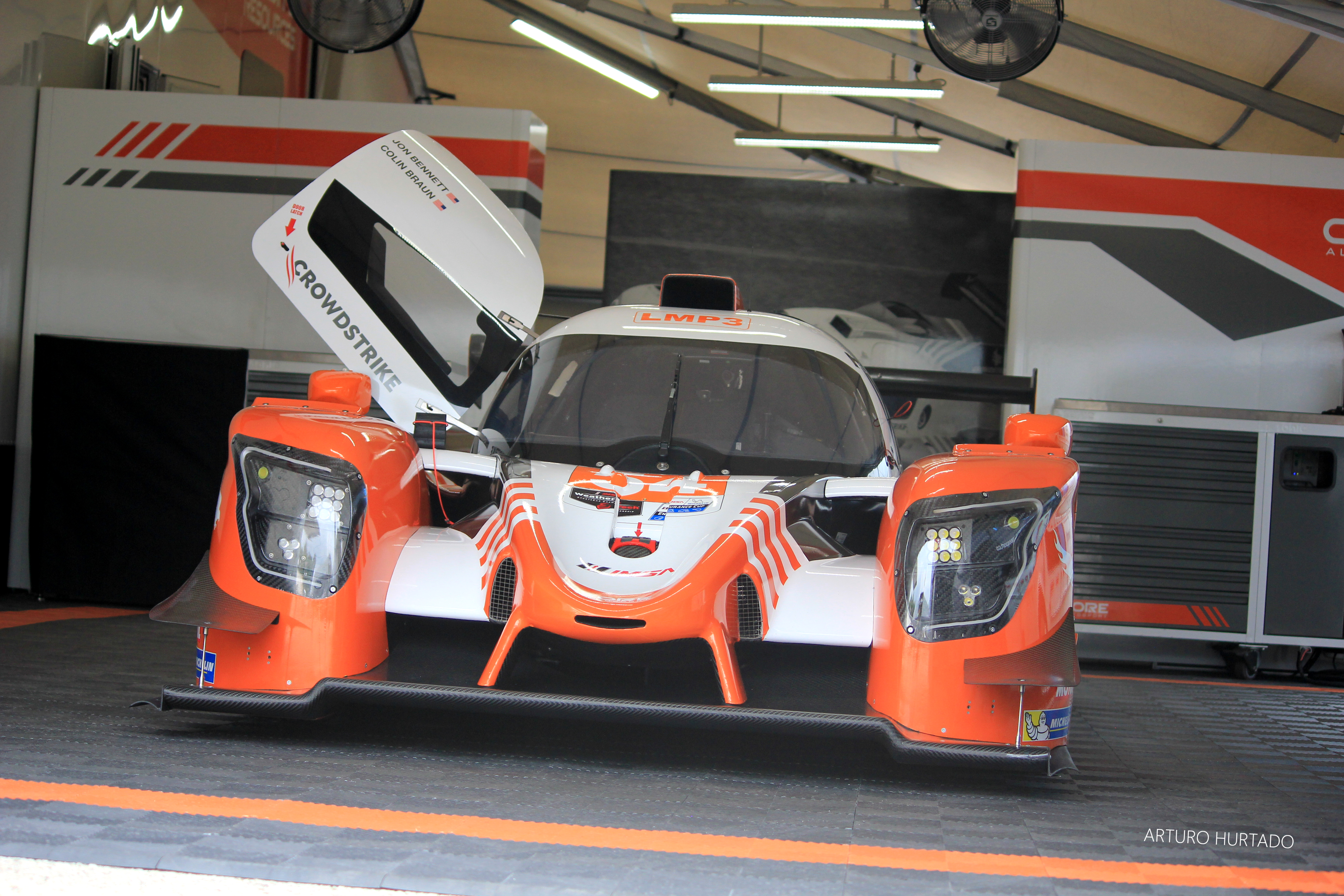
- Founded: 2010
- Folded: 2022
- Team principal(s): Morgan Brady; Jon Bennett
- Former series: WeatherTech SportsCar Championship; American Le Mans Series; IMSA GT3 Cup Challenge; Cooper Tires Prototype Lites 2010
- Teams' Championships: 7 (2010, 2011, 2012, 2013, 2014, 2015, 2022)
- Drivers' Championships: 6 (2010, 2011, 2012, 2014, 2015, 2022)

CORE Autosport was an American auto racing team founded by Jon Bennett in 2010 and based out of Rock Hill, South Carolina. After claiming the IMSA Lites Championship in 2010, the team, led by team manager, Morgan Brady, made the move to competing in the American Le Mans Series. The team competed in the WeatherTech SportsCar Championship fielding the Nos. 911 and 912 Porsche 911 RSR as Porsche GT Team in GT Le Mans under a works contract.

== American Le Mans Series ==
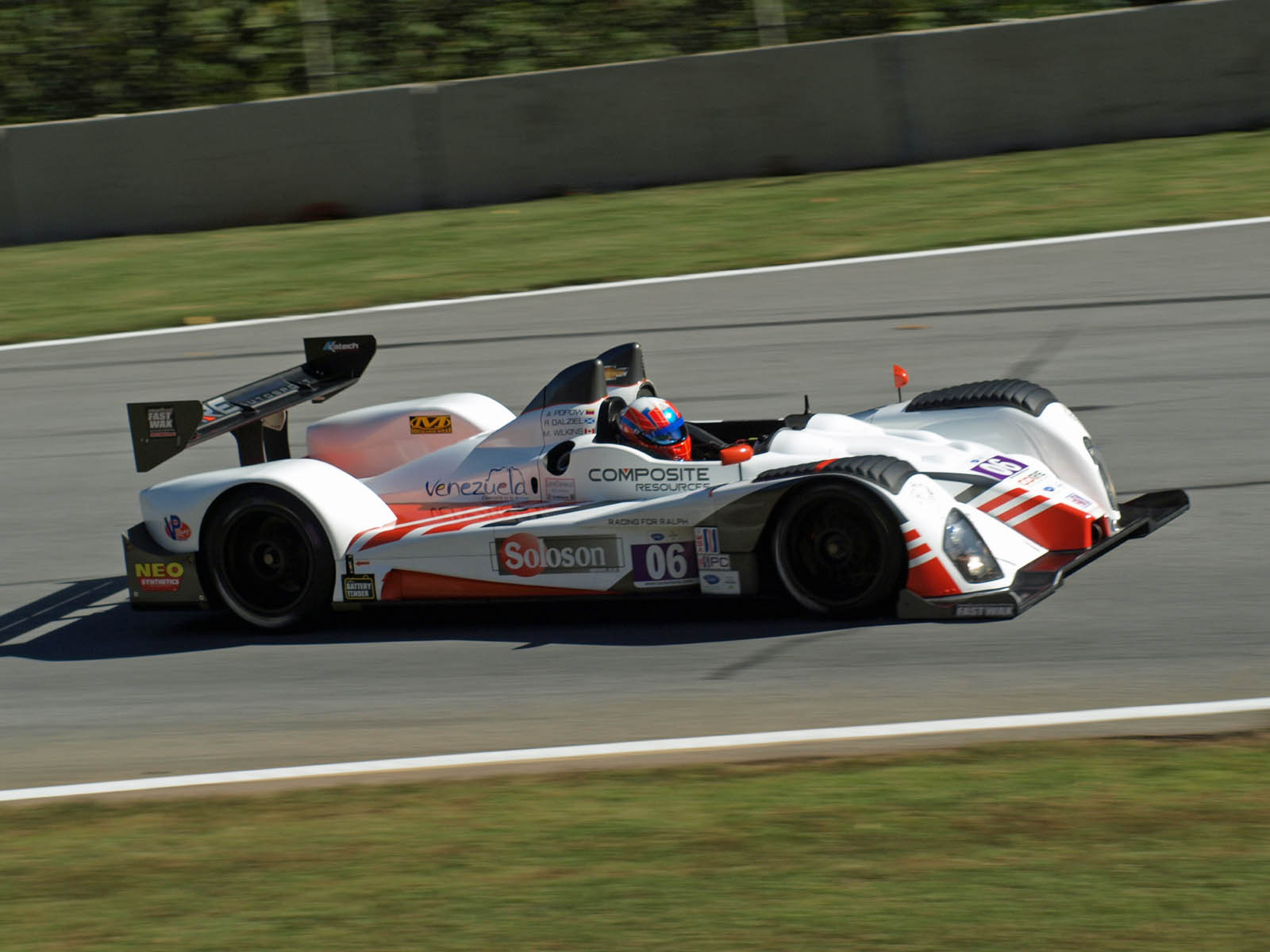
CORE autosport at the 2012 Petit Le Mans.

In 2011, the team began its competition in the American Le Mans Series with a two-car LMP Challenge category effort with team owner Jon Bennett and Frankie Montecalvo driving the #05 and Ricardo González and Gunnar Jeannette driving the #06 Oreca FLM09. Despite stiff competition, the #06 car managed two class and the team's consistent performance would prove successful. In their rookie season, the Core autosport team won the Team Championship by one point with drivers González and Gunnar Jeannette first in the Drivers' Championship.

For the 2012 season, the team would, once again, field two Oreca FLM09 in the LMPC category. This year the #05 car was driven by Jon Bennett and Colin Braun and the #06 car driven by Alex Popow and Ryan Dalziel. 2012 would become a dominant year for the Core autosport Team. Claiming 8 class victories of the 10 race season, including victories at the 12 Hours of Sebring and Petit Le Mans, the team would win their second Team Championship and finish 1st and 2nd in the LMPC Drivers' Championship.

The 2013 season was a transition season for the CORE autosport team. Jon Bennett and Colin Braun would once again team up to run in LMPC Class, but would be joined by a Porsche 911 GT3-RSR driven by Tom Kimber-Smith and Porsche factory driver Patrick Long in the GT class that debut at Mazda Raceway Laguna Seca, the third round of the season. The #05 LMPC car finished the season with a victory at Long Beach and another at Canadian Tire Motorsports Park. The team finished 3 points ahead of Bar1 Motorsports and claimed the Teams' Championship. Jon Bennett finished 3rd in the Drivers' Championship.

== WeatherTech SportsCar Championship ==
For 2014, CORE autosport partnered with Porsche Motorsport North America to run two factory-supported Porsche 911 RSRs in the United SportsCar Championship under the Porsche North America name. Full season pilots Patrick Long and new Porsche factory driver Michael Christensen would team with Patrick Pilet while Nick Tandy and Richard Lietz would be joined by Joerg Bergmeister for the season opening 24 Hours of Daytona.

CORE won the season-opening 2014 24 Hours of Daytona in both the Prototype Challenge class with Colin Braun, Jon Bennett, Mark Wilkins and James Gue, while the factory-run No. 911 Porsche of Nick Tandy, Richard Lietz and Patrick Pilet picked up top class honors in GT Le Mans. The team went on to win the Prototype Challenge Driver, Team and Tequila Patrón North American Endurance Cup Championships. CORE's success with Porsche North America in 2014 helped Porsche earn the 2014 GTLM Manufacturers' Championship. The No. 912 entry driven by Patrick Long and Michael Christensen also won the Tequila Patrón North American Endurance Cup in the GTLM team category.

CORE again claimed the Prototype Challenge Team and Driver Championships in 2015 with Jon Bennett and Colin Braun, making it five-straight Prototype Challenge team titles. Porsche North America's No. 911 entry, with drivers Patrick Pilet, Nick Tandy and Richard Lietz, earned the GTLM Team Championship, thanks in stunning part to the No. 911's historic overall victory at the season-ending Petit Le Mans. Porsche once again collected GTLM Manufacturer Championship honors, while Pilet earned the GTLM Drivers' Championship (because co-driver Nick Tandy missed two rounds to participate in the World Endurance Championship and 24 Hours of Le Mans, he did not share the title).

The team for the 2019 WeatherTech SportsCar Championship would run a Onroak Nissan DPi. The DPIs were purchased from the defunct Extreme Speed Motorsports team. The 2019 retirement of CORE owner Jon Bennett would end the program.

Bennett announced the closure of the team in November 2022.

== Racing record ==
=== 24 Hours of Le Mans results ===
Year	Entrant	No.	Car	Drivers	Class	Laps	Pos.	Class Pos.
2018	(United States) Porsche GT Team	93	Porsche 911 RSR	(New Zealand) Earl Bamber (France) Patrick Pilet (United Kingdom) Nick Tandy	LMGTE Pro	334	27th	10th
2018	(United States) Porsche GT Team	94	Porsche 911 RSR	(Germany) Timo Bernhard (France) Romain Dumas (Germany) Sven Müller	LMGTE Pro	92	DNF	DNF
2019	(United States) Porsche GT Team	93	Porsche 911 RSR	(New Zealand) Earl Bamber (France) Patrick Pilet (United Kingdom) Nick Tandy	LMGTE Pro	342	22nd	**3rd**
2019	(United States) Porsche GT Team	94	Porsche 911 RSR	(France) Mathieu Jaminet (Germany) Sven Müller (Norway) Dennis Olsen	LMGTE Pro	339	27th	7th

=== Complete American Le Mans Series results ===
(key) (results in bold indicate pole position)

Year	Entrant	Class	Car	Drivers	No.	1	2	3	4	5	6	7	8	9	10	Drivers Pts.	Drivers Pos.	Team Pts.	Team Pos.
2011	(United States) CORE Autosport	LMPC	Oreca FLM09			SEB	LBH	LIM	MOS	MOH	ELK	BAL	LAG	ATL					
2011	(United States) CORE Autosport	LMPC	Oreca FLM09	(United States) Jon Bennett (United States) Frankie Montecalvo	005	2	4	5	2	6	3	3	4	5†		130	2nd	167	1st
2011	(United States) CORE Autosport	LMPC	Oreca FLM09	(United Kingdom) Ryan Dalziel	005	2								5†		44	10th	167	1st
2011	(United States) CORE Autosport	LMPC	Oreca FLM09	(United Kingdom) Andy Wallace	005								4			15	17th	167	1st
2011	(United States) CORE Autosport	LMPC	Oreca FLM09	(Mexico) Ricardo González (United States) Gunnar Jeannette	006	3	**1**	2	1	4	5	**4**	2	3		156	1st	167	1st
2011	(United States) CORE Autosport	LMPC	Oreca FLM09	(Mexico) Rudy Junco, Jr.	006	3							2	3		92	6th	167	1st
2012	(United States) CORE Autosport	PC	Oreca FLM09			SEB	LBH	MOS	LIM	MOS	MOH	ELK	BAL	VIR	ATL				
2012	(United States) CORE Autosport	PC	Oreca FLM09	(United States) Jon Bennett (United States) Colin Braun	05	3	3	1	1	**2**	6	2	Ret	**1**	4	150	2nd	206	1st
2012	(United States) CORE Autosport	PC	Oreca FLM09	(United States) Eric Lux	05	3										0	NC	206	1st
2012	(United States) CORE Autosport	PC	Oreca FLM09	(Mexico) Ricardo González	05										4	14	25th	206	1st
2012	(United States) CORE Autosport	PC	Oreca FLM09	(Venezuela) Alex Popow	06	1	**1**	3	2	3	2	1	1	3	1	185	1st	206	1st
2012	(United States) CORE Autosport	PC	Oreca FLM09	(Venezuela) E. J. Viso	06	1										24	17th	206	1st
2012	(United States) CORE Autosport	PC	Oreca FLM09	(United States) Burt Frisselle	06	1										0	NC	206	1st
2012	(United States) CORE Autosport	PC	Oreca FLM09	(United Kingdom) Ryan Dalziel	06		**1**			3	2		1		1	64	7th	206	1st
2012	(United States) CORE Autosport	PC	Oreca FLM09	(United Kingdom) Tom Kimber-Smith	06			3				1		3		68	6th	206	1st
2012	(United States) CORE Autosport	PC	Oreca FLM09	(United States) Jon Bennett	06				2							150	2nd	206	1st
2012	(United States) CORE Autosport	PC	Oreca FLM09	(Canada) Mark Wilkins	06										1	0	NC	206	1st
2013	(United States) CORE Autosport	PC	Oreca FLM09			SEB	LBH	MOS	LIM	MOS	ELK	BAL	AUS	VIR	ATL				
2013	(United States) CORE Autosport	PC	Oreca FLM09	(United States) Jon Bennett	05	5	1	2	2	1	4	2	3	2	3	150	2nd	148	1st
2013	(United States) CORE Autosport	PC	Oreca FLM09	(United States) Colin Braun	05	5	1	2	2	1	4	2				112	5th	148	1st
2013	(United States) CORE Autosport	PC	Oreca FLM09	(Canada) Mark Wilkins	05	5									3	12	20th	148	1st
2013	(United States) CORE Autosport	PC	Oreca FLM09	(United Kingdom) Tom Kimber-Smith	05								3	2	3	36	15th	148	1st

=== Complete United SportsCar Championship results ===
(key) (results in bold indicate pole position)

Year	Entrant	Class	Car	Drivers	No.	1	2	3	4	5	6	7	8	9	10	11	Drivers Pts.	Drivers Pos.	Team Pts.	Team Pos.
2014	(United States) CORE Autosport	PC	Oreca FLM09			DAY	SEB	LAG	KAN	WGL	IND	ELK	VIR	AUS	ATL					
2014	(United States) CORE Autosport	PC	Oreca FLM09	(United States) Jon Bennett (United States) Colin Braun	54	**1**	1	7	1	**1**	**3**	8	3	2	2		321	1st	321	1st
2014	(United States) CORE Autosport	PC	Oreca FLM09	(United States) James Gué	54	**1**	1			**1**					2		141	13th	321	1st
2014	(United States) CORE Autosport	PC	Oreca FLM09	(Canada) Mark Wilkins	54	**1**											36	27th	321	1st
2014	(United States) CORE Autosport	GTLM	Porsche 911 RSR			DAY	SEB	LBH	LAG	WGL	MOS	IND	ELK	VIR	AUS	ATL				
2014	(United States) CORE Autosport	GTLM	Porsche 911 RSR	(France) Frédéric Makowiecki	910										5		27	31st	27	12th
2014	(United States) CORE Autosport	GTLM	Porsche 911 RSR	(France) Patrick Pilet	910										5		140	16th	27	12th
2014	(United States) Porsche North America	GTLM	Porsche 911 RSR	(United Kingdom) Nick Tandy	911	1	9	4	9	5	5	10	10	10	11	**5**	279	11th	279	9th
2014	(United States) Porsche North America	GTLM	Porsche 911 RSR	(Austria) Richard Lietz	911	1	9	4	9	5	5	10	10				189	15th	279	9th
2014	(United States) Porsche North America	GTLM	Porsche 911 RSR	(France) Patrick Pilet	911	1	9			5						**5**	189	15th	279	9th
2014	(United States) Porsche North America	GTLM	Porsche 911 RSR	(Denmark) Michael Christensen	911									10			303	6th	279	9th
2014	(United States) Porsche North America	GTLM	Porsche 911 RSR	(Germany) Jörg Bergmeister	911										11	**5**	107	18th	279	9th
2014	(United States) Porsche North America	GTLM	Porsche 911 RSR	(Denmark) Michael Christensen (United States) Patrick Long	912	9	**1**	5	8	8	9	3	5	8	3	2	303	6th	303	4th
2014	(United States) Porsche North America	GTLM	Porsche 911 RSR	(Germany) Jörg Bergmeister	912	9	**1**										107	18th	303	4th
2014	(United States) Porsche North America	GTLM	Porsche 911 RSR	(France) Patrick Pilet	912					8							189	15th	303	4th
2014	(United States) Porsche North America	GTLM	Porsche 911 RSR	(New Zealand) Earl Bamber	912											2	33	29th	303	4th
2015	(United States) CORE Autosport	PC	Oreca FLM09			DAY	SEB	LAG	BEL	WGL	MOS	LIM	ELK	AUS	ATL					
2015	(United States) CORE Autosport	PC	Oreca FLM09	(United States) Jon Bennett (United States) Colin Braun	54	2	2	2	4	**4**	1	4	3	1	4		318	1st	318	1st
2015	(United States) CORE Autosport	PC	Oreca FLM09	(United States) James Gué	54	2	2			**4**							95	15th	318	1st
2015	(United States) CORE Autosport	PC	Oreca FLM09	(Canada) Mark Wilkins	54	2											33	25th	318	1st
2015	(United States) CORE Autosport	PC	Oreca FLM09	(United States) Anthony Lazzaro	54										4		20	32nd	318	1st
2015	(United States) Porsche North America	GTLM	Porsche 911 RSR			DAY	SEB	LBH	LAG	WGL	MOS	ELK	VIR	AUS	ATL					
2015	(United States) Porsche North America	GTLM	Porsche 911 RSR	(France) Patrick Pilet	911	5	5	4	3	6	**1**	1	**1**	**3**	1		315	1st	315	1st
2015	(United States) Porsche North America	GTLM	Porsche 911 RSR	(United Kingdom) Nick Tandy	911	5	5			6	**1**	1	**1**	**3**	1		255	9th	315	1st
2015	(United States) Porsche North America	GTLM	Porsche 911 RSR	(Denmark) Michael Christensen	911	5			3								56	17th	315	1st
2015	(United States) Porsche North America	GTLM	Porsche 911 RSR	(Germany) Marc Lieb	911	5											27	24th	315	1st
2015	(United States) Porsche North America	GTLM	Porsche 911 RSR	(New Zealand) Earl Bamber	911		5			6							225	10th	315	1st
2015	(United States) Porsche North America	GTLM	Porsche 911 RSR	(Austria) Richard Lietz	911		5								1		87	14th	315	1st
2015	(United States) Porsche North America	GTLM	Porsche 911 RSR	(France) Frédéric Makowiecki	911			4									103	12th	315	1st
2015	(United States) Porsche North America	GTLM	Porsche 911 RSR	(Germany) Jörg Bergmeister	912	7	**7**	8	5	2	7	**2**	2	5	8		276	6th	276	6th
2015	(United States) Porsche North America	GTLM	Porsche 911 RSR	(New Zealand) Earl Bamber	912	7	**7**			2	7	**2**	2	5	8		225	10th	276	6th
2015	(United States) Porsche North America	GTLM	Porsche 911 RSR	(France) Frédéric Makowiecki	912	7	**7**								8		103	12th	276	6th
2015	(United States) Porsche North America	GTLM	Porsche 911 RSR	(Denmark) Michael Christensen	912	7			5								56	17th	276	6th
2015	(United States) Porsche North America	GTLM	Porsche 911 RSR	(United Kingdom) Nick Tandy	912		**7**			2							255	9th	276	6th
2015	(United States) Porsche North America	GTLM	Porsche 911 RSR	(Austria) Richard Lietz	912			8									87	14th	276	6th

=== Complete IMSA SportsCar Championship results ===
(key) (results in bold indicate pole position)

Year	Entrant	Class	Car	Drivers	No.	1	2	3	4	5	6	7	8	9	10	11	12	Drivers Pts.	Drivers Pos.	Team Pts.	Team Pos.
2016	(United States) CORE Autosport	PC	Oreca FLM09			DAY	SEB	LBH	LGA	BEL	WGL	MOS	LIM	ELK	AUS	ATL					
2016	(United States) CORE Autosport	PC	Oreca FLM09	(United States) Jon Bennett (United States) Colin Braun	54	8†	**1**	7	3	2	6	**1**	**8**	2				245	7th	245	7th
2016	(United States) CORE Autosport	PC	Oreca FLM09	(Canada) Mark Wilkins	54	8†	**1**†				6†							3	29th	245	7th
2016	(United States) CORE Autosport	PC	Oreca FLM09	(United Kingdom) Martin Plowman	54	8†												1	31st	245	7th
2016	(United States) Porsche North America	GTLM	Porsche 911 RSR			DAY	SEB	LBH	LGA	WGL	MOS	LIM	ELK	VIR	AUS	ATL					
2016	(United States) Porsche North America	GTLM	Porsche 911 RSR	(France) Patrick Pilet (United Kingdom) Nick Tandy	911	**8**	10	1	8	9	8	6	7	6	2	10		313	4th	285	4th
2016	(United States) Porsche North America	GTLM	Porsche 911 RSR	(France) Kévin Estre	911	**8**	10											46	23rd	285	4th
2016	(United States) Porsche North America	GTLM	Porsche 911 RSR	(Austria) Richard Lietz	911											10		22	29th	285	4th
2016	(United States) Porsche North America	GTLM	Porsche 911 RSR	(New Zealand) Earl Bamber (France) Frédéric Makowiecki	912	3	3	7	3	10	6	8	4	3	1	5		285	8th	285	8th
2016	(United States) Porsche North America	GTLM	Porsche 911 RSR	(Denmark) Michael Christensen	912	3	3									5		103	13th	285	8th
2017	(United States) CORE Autosport	GTD	Porsche 911 GT3 R			DAY	SEB	LBH	AUS	BEL	WGL	MOS	LIM	ELK	VIR	LGA	ATL				
2017	(United States) CORE Autosport	GTD	Porsche 911 GT3 R	(United States) Jon Bennett (United States) Colin Braun	54	22	16	14	14	8	13	14	17	7	8	4	5	231	18th	231	14th
2017	(United States) CORE Autosport	GTD	Porsche 911 GT3 R	(Sweden) Niclas Jönsson	54	22	16				13						5	68	39th	231	14th
2017	(United States) CORE Autosport	GTD	Porsche 911 GT3 R	(United States) Patrick Long	54	22												90	20th	231	14th
2017	(United States) Porsche GT Team	GTLM	Porsche 911 RSR			DAY	SEB	LBH	AUS	WGL	MOS	LIM	ELK	VIR	LGA	ATL					
2017	(United States) Porsche GT Team	GTLM	Porsche 911 RSR	(France) Patrick Pilet (Germany) Dirk Werner	911	2	7	6	4	7	**7**	1	8	8	3	6		295	5th	295	5th
2017	(United States) Porsche GT Team	GTLM	Porsche 911 RSR	(France) Frédéric Makowiecki	911	2	7											57	19th	295	5th
2017	(United States) Porsche GT Team	GTLM	Porsche 911 RSR	(United Kingdom) Nick Tandy	911											6		25	25th	295	5th
2017	(United States) Porsche GT Team	GTLM	Porsche 911 RSR	(Belgium) Laurens Vanthoor	912	6	8	3	8	6	6	2	2	7	7	5		287	6th	287	6th
2017	(United States) Porsche GT Team	GTLM	Porsche 911 RSR	(France) Kévin Estre	912	6	8	3										78	14th	287	6th
2017	(United States) Porsche GT Team	GTLM	Porsche 911 RSR	(Austria) Richard Lietz	912	6	8											48	21st	287	6th
2017	(United States) Porsche GT Team	GTLM	Porsche 911 RSR	(Germany) Wolf Henzler	912				8									23	27th	287	6th
2017	(United States) Porsche GT Team	GTLM	Porsche 911 RSR	(Italy) Gianmaria Bruni	912					6	6	2	2	7	7	5		186	10th	287	6th
2017	(United States) Porsche GT Team	GTLM	Porsche 911 RSR	(New Zealand) Earl Bamber	912											5		26	24th	287	6th
2018	(United States) CORE Autosport	P	Oreca 07			DAY	SEB	LBH	MOH	BEL	WGL	MOS	ELK	LGA	ATL						
2018	(United States) CORE Autosport	P	Oreca 07	(United States) Jon Bennett (United States) Colin Braun	54	3	4	10	13	12	2	**1**	1	2	7			274	2nd	274	2nd
2018	(United States) CORE Autosport	P	Oreca 07	(France) Romain Dumas	54	3	4				2				7			114	20th	274	2nd
2018	(United States) CORE Autosport	P	Oreca 07	(France) Loïc Duval	54	3												30	47th	274	2nd
2018	(United States) Porsche GT Team	GTLM	Porsche 911 RSR			DAY	SEB	LBH	MOH	WGL	MOS	LIM	ELK	VIR	LGA	ATL					
2018	(United States) Porsche GT Team	GTLM	Porsche 911 RSR	(France) Patrick Pilet (United Kingdom) Nick Tandy	911	8	1	6	6	3	**4**	5	5	8	8	1		299	7th	295	5th
2018	(United States) Porsche GT Team	GTLM	Porsche 911 RSR	(France) Frédéric Makowiecki	911	8	1									1		93	10th	295	5th
2018	(United States) Porsche GT Team	GTLM	Porsche 911 RSR	(New Zealand) Earl Bamber (Belgium) Laurens Vanthoor	912	6	3	7	1	4	6	3	4	5	2	6		299	7th	295	5th
2018	(United States) Porsche GT Team	GTLM	Porsche 911 RSR	(Italy) Gianmaria Bruni	912	6	3											93	10th	295	5th
2018	(United States) Porsche GT Team	GTLM	Porsche 911 RSR	(France) Mathieu Jaminet	912											6		25	21st	295	5th
2019	(United States) CORE Autosport	DPi	Ligier Nissan DPi			DAY	SEB	LBH	MOH	BEL	WGL	MOS	ELK	LGA	ATL						
2019	(United States) CORE Autosport	DPi	Ligier Nissan DPi	(United States) Jon Bennett (United States) Colin Braun	54	4	5	11	11	7	11	**7**	10	7	8			230	10th	230	9th
2019	(United States) CORE Autosport	DPi	Ligier Nissan DPi	(France) Romain Dumas	54	4	5				11				8			97	16th	230	9th
2019	(United States) CORE Autosport	DPi	Ligier Nissan DPi	(France) Loïc Duval	54	4												28	31st	230	9th
2019	(United States) Porsche GT Team	GTLM	Porsche 911 RSR			DAY	SEB	LBH	MOH	WGL	MOS	LIM	ELK	VIR	LGA	ATL					
2019	(United States) Porsche GT Team	GTLM	Porsche 911 RSR	(France) Patrick Pilet (United Kingdom) Nick Tandy	911	**5**	**1**	**5**	3	1	3	4	7	1	8	6		317	2nd	317	2nd
2019	(United States) Porsche GT Team	GTLM	Porsche 911 RSR	(France) Frédéric Makowiecki	911	**5**	**1**									6		86	15th	317	2nd
2019	(United States) Porsche GT Team	GTLM	Porsche 911 RSR	(New Zealand) Earl Bamber (Belgium) Laurens Vanthoor	912	3	5	1	1	6	1	**2**	3	**2**	7	5		330	1st	330	1st
2019	(United States) Porsche GT Team	GTLM	Porsche 911 RSR	(France) Mathieu Jaminet	912	3	5									5		82	19th	330	1st
2020	(United States) Porsche GT Team	GTLM	Porsche 911 RSR-19			DAY1	DAY2	SEB1	ELK	VIR	ATL1	MOH	CLT	ATL2	LGA	SEB2					
2020	(United States) Porsche GT Team	GTLM	Porsche 911 RSR-19	(France) Frédéric Makowiecki (United Kingdom) Nick Tandy	911	**3**	3	6	4	**3**	**4**		5	1	3	1		297	5th	297	5th
2020	(United States) Porsche GT Team	GTLM	Porsche 911 RSR-19	(Australia) Matt Campbell	911	**3**								1				65	11th	297	5th
2020	(United States) Porsche GT Team	GTLM	Porsche 911 RSR-19	(New Zealand) Earl Bamber	911											1		289	6th	297	5th
2020	(United States) Porsche GT Team	GTLM	Porsche 911 RSR-19	(New Zealand) Earl Bamber (Belgium) Laurens Vanthoor	912	2	2	3	**5**	5	6		6	5	1	2		289	6th	289	6th
2020	(United States) Porsche GT Team	GTLM	Porsche 911 RSR-19	(France) Mathieu Jaminet	912	2								5				58	12th	289	6th
2020	(United States) Porsche GT Team	GTLM	Porsche 911 RSR-19	(Switzerland) Neel Jani	912											2		32	14th	289	6th
2021	(United States) CORE Autosport	LMP3	Ligier JS P320			DAY	SEB	MOH	WGL1	WGL2	ELK	ATL									
2021	(United States) CORE Autosport	LMP3	Ligier JS P320	(United States) Jon Bennett (United States) Colin Braun	54	5	1	4	2	3	1	7						1990	2nd	1990	2nd
2021	(United States) CORE Autosport	LMP3	Ligier JS P320	(United States) George Kurtz	54	5	1		2			7						968	11th	1990	2nd
2021	(United States) CORE Autosport	LMP3	Ligier JS P320	(United States) Matt McMurry	54	5												0	-	1990	2nd
2022	(United States) CORE Autosport	LMP3	Ligier JS P320			DAY	SEB	MOH	WGL	MOS	ELK	ATL									
2022	(United States) CORE Autosport	LMP3	Ligier JS P320	(United States) Jon Bennett (United States) Colin Braun	54	3	5	1	2	1	3	5						2002	1st	2002	1st
2022	(United States) CORE Autosport	LMP3	Ligier JS P320	(United States) George Kurtz	54	3	5		2			5						921	17th	2002	1st
2022	(United States) CORE Autosport	LMP3	Ligier JS P320	(Sweden) Niclas Jönsson	54	3												0	-	2002	1st

=== Complete Global RallyCross Championship results ===
(key)

==== GRC Lites ====
Year	Entrant	Car	No.	Driver	1	2	3	4	5	6	7	8	9	10	11	12	Lites	Points
2016	CORE Autosport	Lites Ford Fiesta	54	(United States) **Jon Bennett**	PHO1	PHO2	DAL	DAY1; 9	DAY2; 12	MCAS1	MCAS2; C	DC; 9	AC; 12	SEA; 7			18th	51
2016	CORE Autosport	Lites Ford Fiesta	54	(United States) **Colin Braun**											LA1; DSQ	LA2; 3	10th	154
2016	CORE Autosport	Lites Ford Fiesta	56	(United States) **Colin Braun**	PHO1	PHO2	DAL	DAY1; 3	DAY2; 10	MCAS1	MCAS2; C	DC; 12	AC; 3	SEA			10th	154
2016	CORE Autosport	Lites Ford Fiesta	56	(United States) **Scott Anderson**	PHO1	PHO2	DAL	DAY1	DAY2	MCAS1	MCAS2; C	DC	AC	SEA; 11	LA1; 12	LA2; 2	16th	55
2017	CORE Autosport	Lites Ford Fiesta	54	(United States) **Jon Bennett**	MEM; 7	LOU; 5	THO1; 8	THO2; 8	OTT1; DNS	OTT2; 9	INDY	AC1; 9	AC2; 9	SEA1	SEA2	LA	10th	281
2017	CORE Autosport	Lites Ford Fiesta	56	(United States) **Colin Braun**	MEM; 4	LOU; 4	THO1; 4	THO2; 2	OTT1; 2	OTT2; 8	INDY	AC1; DNS	AC2; 4	SEA1	SEA2	LA	8th	405

== WeatherTech SportsCar Championship wins ==
#	Season	Date	Classes	Track / Race	No.	Winning drivers	Chassis	Engine
1	2018	July 8	Prototype	Mosport	54	(United States) Jon Bennett / (United States) Colin Braun	Oreca 07	Gibson GK428 4.2 L V8
2	2018	August 5	Prototype	Road America	54	(United States) Jon Bennett / (United States) Colin Braun	Oreca 07	Gibson GK428 4.2 L V8
