= Le Mans Prototype Challenge =

Sportscar racing class

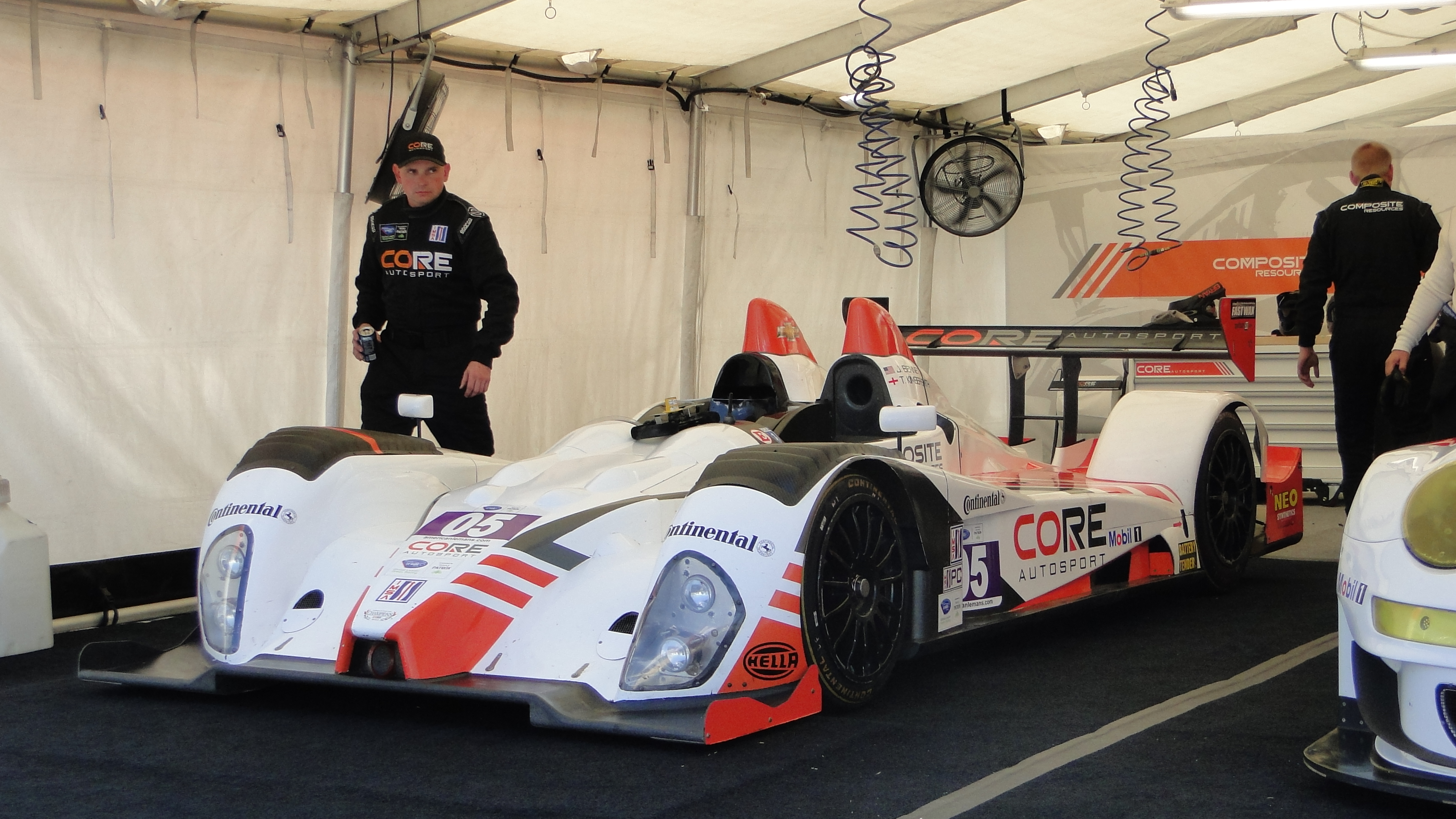
A Le Mans Prototype Challenge car.

The Le Mans Prototype Challenge (shortened to LMP Challenge or LMPC) was a spec sports prototype formula created by the Automobile Club de l'Ouest (ACO), organisers of the 24 Hours of Le Mans, and sports car constructor Oreca. The formula is intended as part of a ladder system for young and upcoming drivers into the world of endurance racing while also serving as a value engineered entry for drivers and teams into Le Mans Prototypes due to limitations on manufacturers and suppliers.

Initially launched as an independent racing series known as the Formula Le Mans Cup in 2009, the formula has since been expanded to allow participation in three separate series for 2010. The American Le Mans Series used the title Le Mans Prototype Challenge since its inception. The Le Mans Series used the name Formula Le Mans until 2011. All ACO series adopted the name Le Mans Prototype Challenge in 2012.

== Oreca FLM09 ==
Oreca FLM09
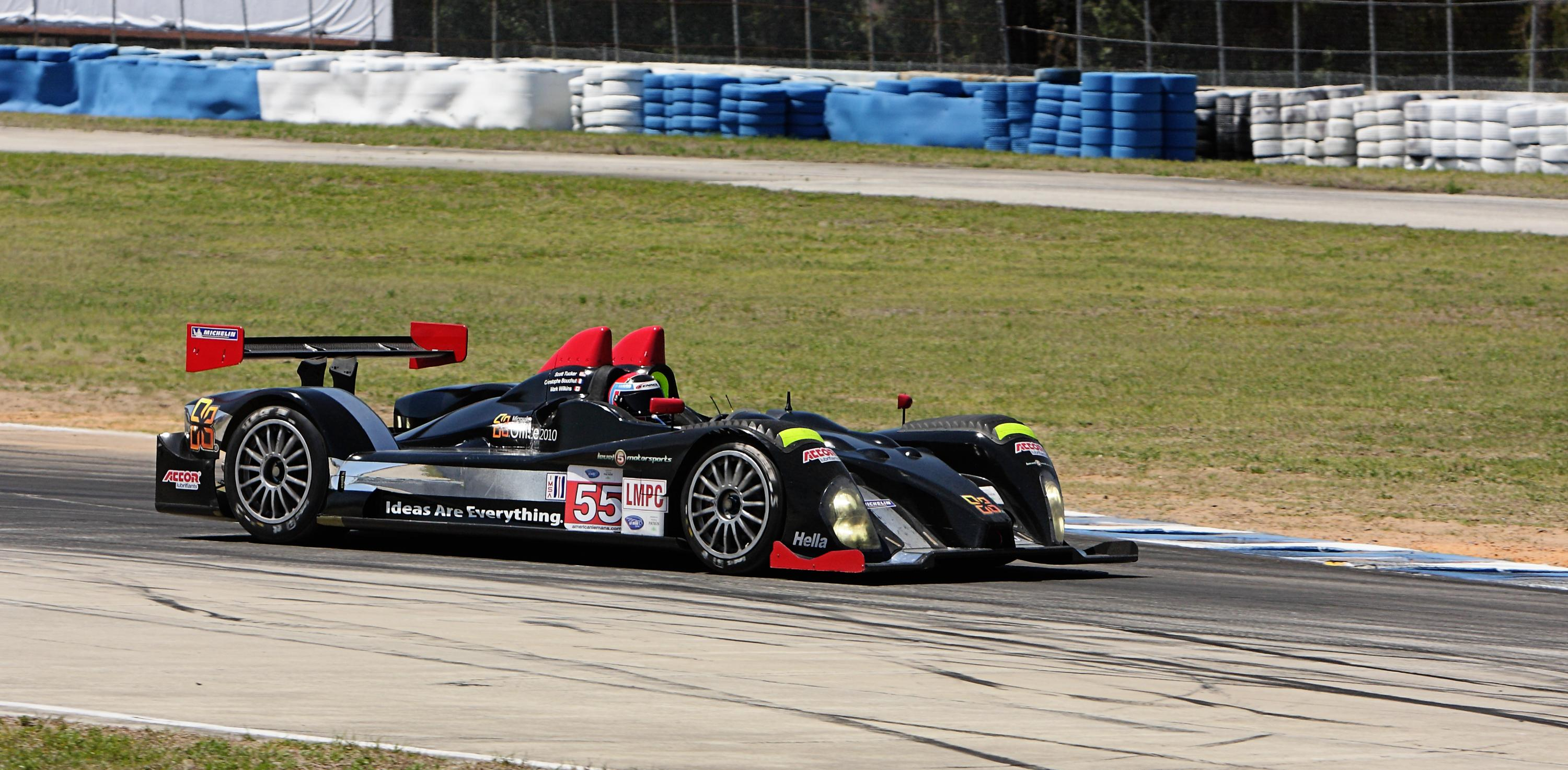
- Category: Le Mans Prototype
- Constructor: Oreca-Courage
- Designers: Paolo Catone, Ben Wood

Technical specifications
- Chassis: Carbon fibre monocoque
- Suspension (front): Double wishbone, push rod operated over damper
- Suspension (rear): Double wishbone, push rod operated over damper
- Axle track: 1,990 mm (78 in)
- Wheelbase: 2,870 mm (113 in)
- Engine: General Motors LS3 6.2 L (380 cu in) V8 naturally aspirated mid-engined, longitudinally mounted
- Transmission: Xtrac 6-speed sequential manual
- Weight: 900 kg (2,000 lb) minimum
- Lubricants: Motul
- Tyres: Michelin, Continental

Competition history
- Notable entrants: Various
- Notable drivers: Various

The Formula Le Mans car is built by French manufacturer Oreca and known as the FLM09. The chassis is based on Courage's LC75 LMP2 chassis, while the car's carbon fiber and kevlar bodywork is a simplified version of the LC75's design. All FLM09s use a production-based General Motors small block LS3 V8 which produces approximately 430 horsepower (440 PS). Transmissions are supplied by Xtrac and feature a six-speed sequential transmission operated by paddle shifters. Engine management is regulated by Magneti Marelli. Up to 2012, all FLM09 cars ran on Michelin slick tires based on their LMP tires but in March 2013, it was announced that Continental AG would be the tire supplier for the LMP Challenge class in the upcoming American Le Mans Series season owing to Continental's deal with NASCAR as sole tire supplier for their sportscar arm. Reinforced carbon-carbon disc brakes are supplied by Brembo.

In order to accommodate endurance races in 2010, Oreca also offered an endurance upgrade for the FLM09 which adds an air restrictor to the engine to increase reliability as well as slowing the car in comparison to LMP2 category cars.

== Series ==
=== Formula Le Mans Cup ===
When the Formula Le Mans category was introduced in 2009, it was initially a support series for many races in the Le Mans Series in Europe as well as at the 24 Hours of Le Mans. The ten race Formula Le Mans Cup organized by the ACO and Oreca included over a dozen entries and was dominated by the DAMS driving pair of Gavin Cronje and Nico Verdonck, the latter of which won the inaugural Drivers Championship. Most races were one hour in length with a mandatory pit stop to allow teams to change drivers, while a season finale at Circuit de Nevers Magny-Cours was held for three hours.

=== Sportscars Winter Series ===
As a further development of the Formula Le Mans Cup, Oreca launched the Sportscars Winter Series in late 2009 in order to allow further amateur driver development during the Le Mans Series off-season. The series, which is held exclusively at the Circuit Paul Ricard, France, combines Formula Le Mans cars with competitors from the GT2 and GT3 grand tourer categories. The three race season includes two races of thirty minutes and one race of an hour in length.

=== Le Mans Series ===
In the 2010 season the Formula Le Mans Cup was integrated into the Le Mans Series, becoming one of five categories within the series. The inaugural season, Formula Le Mans cars participated in four of the Le Mans Series' European races, while a fifth event held solely for Formula Le Mans cars. Teams will be required to have at least one amateur driver in order to further driver development. Championships will be awarded for professional drivers, amateur drivers, and teams, with the winning amateur driver earning a test in an Oreca Le Mans Prototype. In 2012, the class adopted the Le Mans Prototype Challenge name and took part in the European Le Mans Series until 2014.

=== IMSA ===
On 16 August 2009, the International Motor Sports Association announced a reorganization of the class structure of the American Le Mans Series, creating a new category known as Le Mans Prototype Challenge. The class utilizes the Formula Le Mans ruleset similar to the Le Mans Series, and competes in all nine American Le Mans Series events. American Le Mans Series regular Intersport Racing became the first North American team to purchase an FLM09, allowing the team to progress drivers from IMSA Lites, through LMP Challenge, and into their LMP1 category entry. After NASCAR Holdings purchased IMSA in late 2012 in preparation for the 2014 unification of sportscar racing in North America, tyres changed from Michelin to Continental, owing to the carryover Grand American Road Racing Association specification tyre contract with Continental.

IMSA decided to drop the Prototype Challenge class from the championship at the end of 2017, thus retiring the class altogether.
