= Jim Pace (racing driver) =

American racing driver (1961–2020)

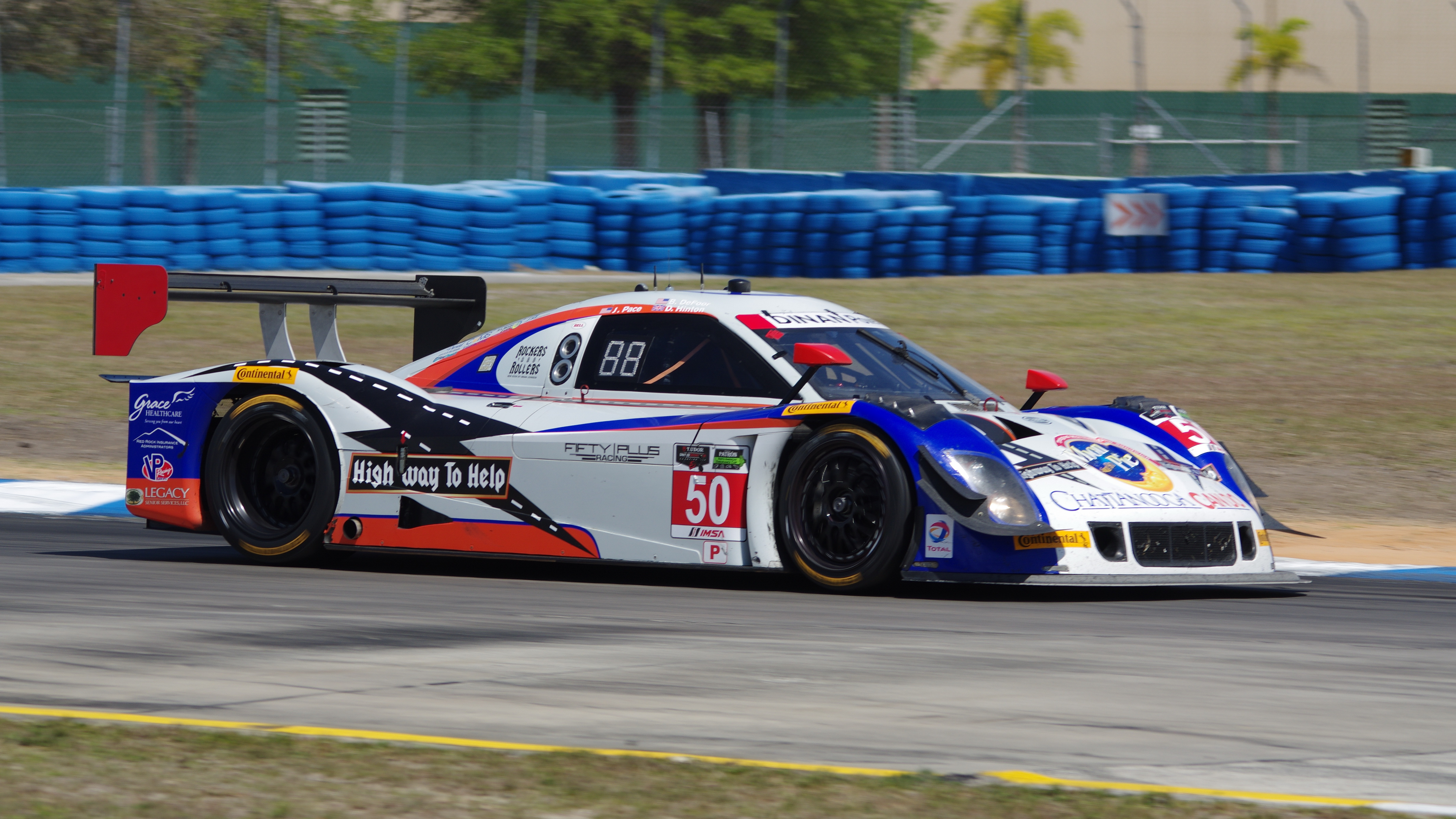
- Pace's Riley DP in 2014
- Nationality: (United States) American
- Born: James Russell Pace; February 1, 1961 Monticello, Mississippi, U.S.
- Died: November 13, 2020 (aged 59) Memphis, Tennessee, U.S.
- Categorisation: FIA Silver (until 2016); FIA Bronze (2017–2020)

James Russell Pace (February 1, 1961 – November 13, 2020) was an American racing driver.

== Racing career ==
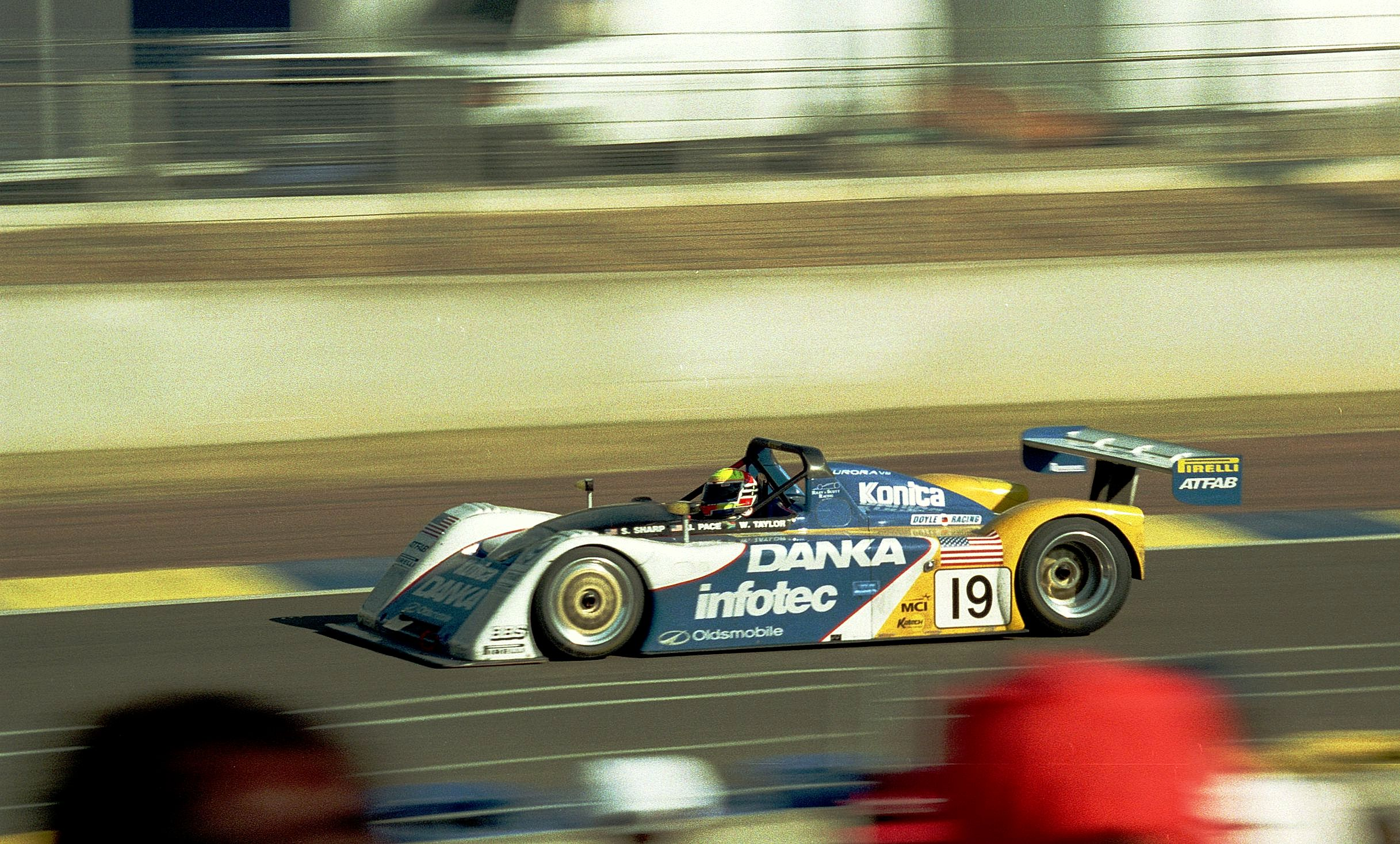
Pace's only ever Le Mans start, 1996.

Pace began his career in the Barber Saab Pro Series in 1988. He soon moved to sports car racing and won the GTU class at the 1990 24 Hours of Daytona. Pace, along with co-drivers Scott Sharp and Wayne Taylor, drove the Riley & Scott Mk III to the overall victory in the 1996 24 Hours of Daytona, then weeks later also won the 12 Hours of Sebring. Later in 1996, Pace was a race driver for the same team in the 24 Hours of Le Mans. After years of only driving at Daytona, Pace returned to regular drives in the Rolex Sports Car Series GT class in 2007. In 2008, he drove a Porsche 911 for The Racer's Group, and in 2009 drove for Farnbacher Loles Racing. In later years, he participated in vintage racing events.

== Personal life ==
Pace was born on February 1, 1961, in Monticello, Mississippi. He attended Mississippi State University.

Pace resided in Ridgeland, Mississippi. He died from COVID-19 in Memphis, Tennessee, on November 13, 2020, at the age of 59.

== Racing record ==
=== 24 Hours of Le Mans ===
Year	Team	Co-Drivers	Car	Class	Laps	Pos.	Class Pos.
1996	(United States) Riley & Scott Cars Inc.	(United States) Scott Sharp (South Africa) Wayne Taylor	Riley & Scott Mk III-Oldsmobile	WSC	157	DNF	DNF

=== WeatherTech SportsCar Championship ===
(key) (Races in bold indicate pole position) (Races in italics indicate fastest lap)

Year	Team	Class	Make	Engine	1	2	3	4	5	6	7	8	9	10	11	Pos.	Points
2014	Highway to Help	P	Riley Mk XXVI DP	Dinan (BMW) 5.0 L V8	DAY; 9	SEB; 14	LBH	LGA	DET	WGL	MOS	IMS	ELK	COA	PET	41st	41
2015	Highway to Help	P	Riley Mk XXVI DP	Dinan (BMW) 5.0 L V8	DAY; 8	SEB; 7	LBH	LGA	DET	WGL	MOS	ELK	COA	PET		19th	49
2016	Highway to Help	P	Riley Mk XXVI DP	Dinan (BMW) 5.0 L V8	DAY; 8	SEB; 10	LBH	LGA	DET	WGL; DNS	MOS	ELK	COA	PET		25th	46
