= HPD ARX-04b =

Le Mans prototype

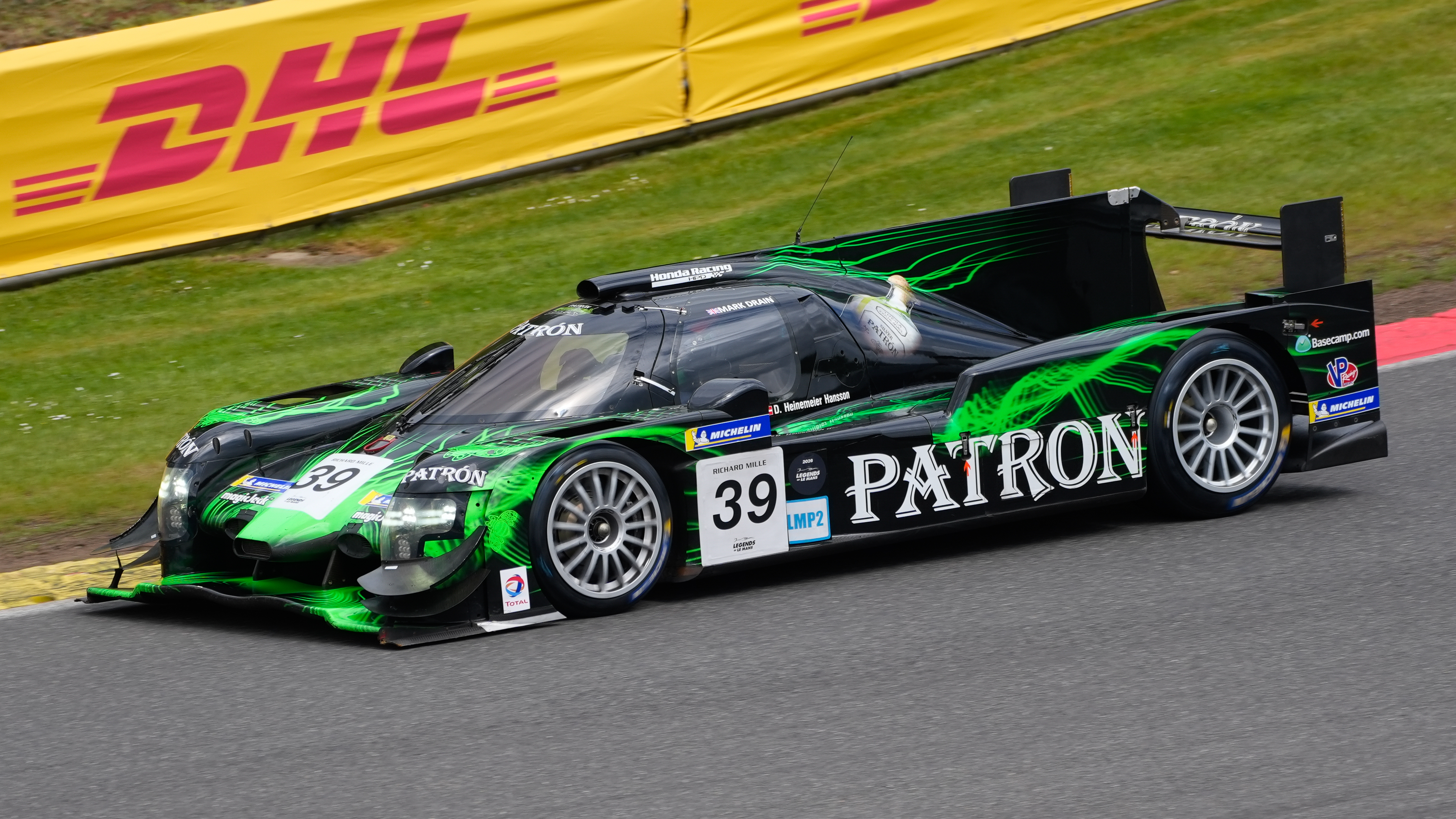
- The No. 39 ARX-04b driven by Mark Drain during the Legends of Le Mans Series race supporting the 2026 6 Hours of Spa-Francorchamps
- Category: Le Mans Prototype (LMP2)
- Constructor: HPD (Wirth)
- Designer: Nick Wirth
- Predecessor: HPD ARX-03b
- Successor: Acura ARX-05

Technical specifications
- Chassis: Carbon fibre composite monocoque
- Suspension (front): Double wishbones, push-rod actuated coil springs and four-way adjustable dampers, anti-roll bar
- Suspension (rear): Double wishbones, push-rod actuated coil springs and four-way adjustable dampers, anti-roll bar
- Engine: Honda HR28TT 2.8 litre V6 twin turbo mid-engined, longitudinally mounted
- Transmission: 6-speed sequential manual
- Weight: 900kg
- Fuel: Shell
- Tyres: Continental

Competition history
- Notable entrants: (United States) Extreme Speed Motorsports
- Notable drivers: (United States) Ed Brown (United States) Jon Fogarty (United States) Johannes van Overbeek (United States) Scott Sharp (United Kingdom) Ryan Dalziel (Denmark) David Heinemeier Hansson
- Debut: 2015 24 Hours of Daytona
Races	Wins	Poles	F/Laps
2	0	0	0
- Constructors' Championships: 0
- Drivers' Championships: 0

The HPD ARX-04b is an LMP2 race car designed and built by Wirth Research for Honda Performance Development. The car was designed as the successor to the HPD ARX-03 series of Le Mans Prototypes, however the poor performance of the car meant that the older model outlived the ARX-04b, and the 04b only contested one race, the 2015 24 Hours of Daytona.

== Racing history ==
The car was designed to meet the new set of LMP2 regulations, starting in 2014. Two cars were delivered to its sole customer, Extreme Speed Motorsports, in December 2014, where it soon began testing. The team intended to use the cars in the 2015 United SportsCar Championship, starting at the 24 Hours of Daytona. The cars were uncompetitive during the race, and both cars failed to reach the finish. The #1 car managed to complete 389 laps to the winners 740, but the #2 car managed only 50.

Following the disappointment of Daytona, Extreme Speed Motorsport decided to take time to test the car further, opting to race the older HPD ARX-03b at Sebring. The team remained unsatisfied with the car, and chose to replace them with the Ligier JS P2. Daytona remains the only race outing of the ARX-04. HPD continued to test and develop the car, to try to resolve aerodynamic problems and improve its performance.

The ARX-04 was also entered into the 2015 Pikes Peak International Hillclimb, with Justin Wilson assigned to drive the car. However, reliability issues meant that the car was unable to drive in the event.

In 2016, a revised version of the ARX-04b was tested by Michael Shank Racing. Shank later praised the improvements that the car has made. The car was later used by Shank to test the 2017 Continental tyres for the upcoming season

The ARX-04b made a racing return at the 2023 Silverstone Festival Masters Endurance Legends event, driven by Steve Tandy.

It then returned again in 2024, to race in its 2nd Masters Endurance Legands race and won its class and broke the LMP2 lap record at Donington Park driven by Alfie Briggs

=== Complete United SportsCar Championship results ===
(key) Races in bold indicates pole position. Races in italics indicates fastest lap.

Complete United SportsCar Championship results
Year	Entrant	Class	Drivers	No.	Rds.	Rounds										Pts.	Pos.
Year	Entrant	Class	Drivers	No.	Rds.	1	2	3	4	5	6	7	8	9	10	Pts.	Pos.
2015	(United States) Tequila Patrón ESM	P	(United States) Scott Sharp (United Kingdom) Ryan Dalziel (Denmark) David Heinemeier Hansson	1	1; 1; 1	DAY; 10	SEB	LBH	LGA	DET	WGL	MOS	ELK	COA	PET	45*	12th*
2015	(United States) Tequila Patrón ESM	P	(United States) Ed Brown (United States) Jon Fogarty (United States) Johannes van Overbeek	2	1; 1; 1	DAY; 14	SEB	LBH	LGA	DET	WGL	MOS	ELK	COA	PET	42*	13th*

* Points were scored with the ARX-03b
