= 2016 6 Hours of The Glen =

Sixth round of the 2016 IMSA SportsCar Championship season

Track Map of Watkins Glen International.

The 2016 Sahlen's Six Hours of The Glen was a sports car race sanctioned by the International Motor Sports Association (IMSA). The race was held at Watkins Glen International in Watkins Glen, New York on the July 3, 2016. This race was the sixth round of the 2016 IMSA SportsCar Championship.

== Background ==
=== Preview ===
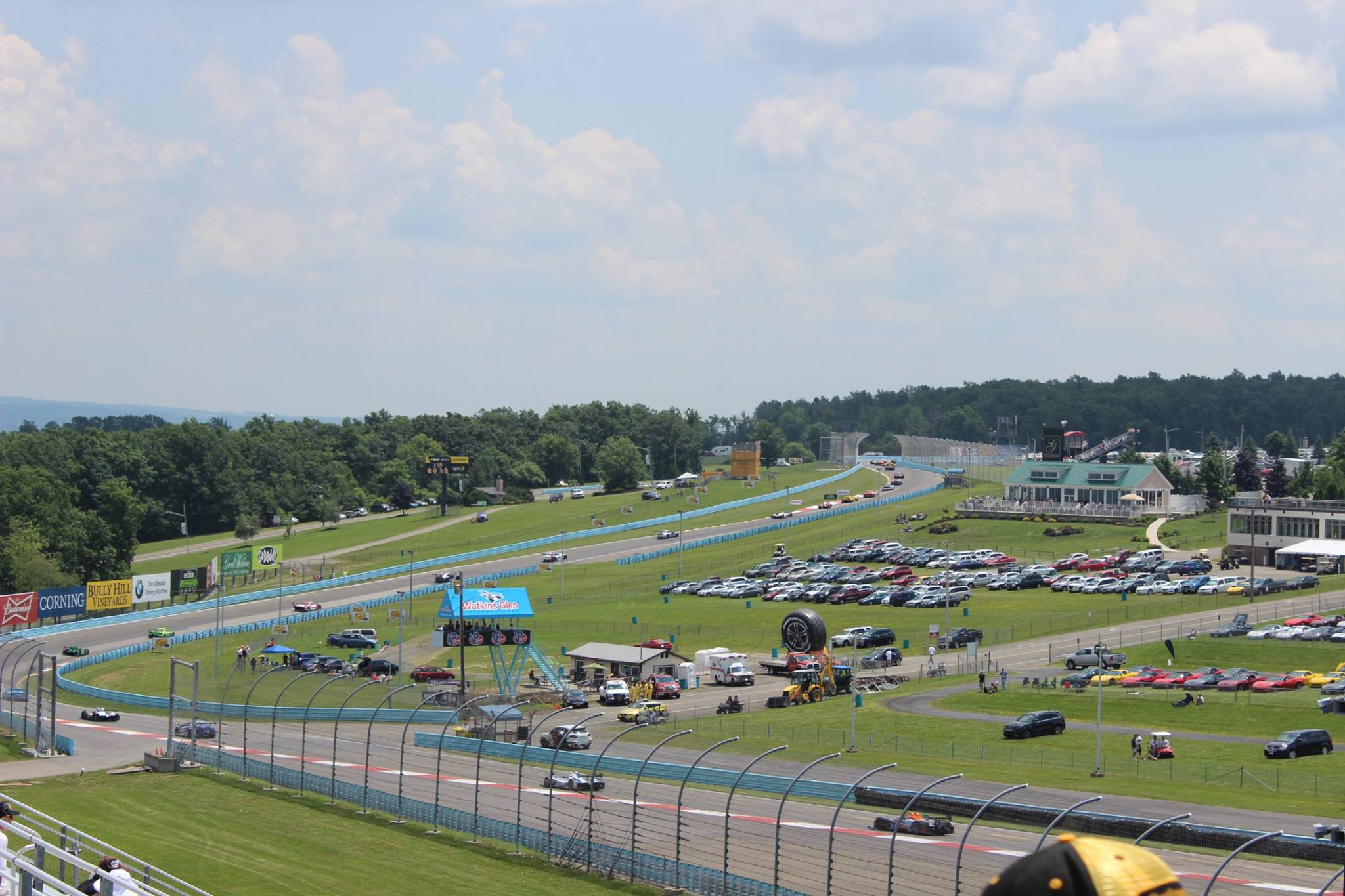
Watkins Glen International, where the race was held.

International Motor Sports Association (IMSA) president Scott Atherton confirmed the race was part of the schedule for the 2016 IMSA SportsCar Championship (IMSA SCC) in August 2015. It was the third consecutive year the event was held as part of the WeatherTech SportsCar Championship. The 2016 Sahlen's Six Hours of The Glen was the sixth of twelve scheduled sports car races of 2016 by IMSA, and was the third round of the Patron North American Endurance Cup. The race was held at the eleven-turn 3.450 mi (5.552 km) Watkins Glen International circuit on July 3, 2016.

IMSA altered the balance of performance to try to create parity within the GTD category. The Audi R8 LMS and Lamborghini Huracán GT3 received a 2 mm (0.079 in) larger air restrictor while the Dodge Viper GT3-R had a 1 mm (0.039 in) air restrictor reduction. The Ferrari 488 GT3 received a reduction in turbo boost pressure while BMW M6 GT3 received an increase in turbo boost pressure. The Porsche 911 GT3 R had its weight increased by 15 kg (33 lb).

Before the race, Jordan Taylor and Ricky Taylor led the Prototype Drivers' Championship with 151 points, ahead of João Barbosa and Christian Fittipaldi on countback with 151 points, and Eric Curran and Dane Cameron in third 147 points. With 162 points, PC was led by Alex Popow and Renger van der Zande over Robert Alon and Tom Kimber-Smith by 3 points. In GTLM, Oliver Gavin and Tommy Milner led the Drivers' Championship with 130 points, 12 points ahead of Earl Bamber and Frédéric Makowiecki in second. In GTD, the Drivers' Championship was led by Alessandro Balzan and Christina Nielsen with 126 points; the duo held an eight-point advantage over Mario Farnbacher and Alex Riberas. Chevrolet and Porsche were leading their respective Manufacturers' Championships, while Wayne Taylor Racing, Starworks Motorsport, Corvette Racing, and Scuderia Corsa each led their own Teams' Championships.

Forty-one cars were officially entered for the Sahlen's Six Hours of The Glen, with most of the entries in the Prototype, Grand Touring Le Mans (GTLM), and Grand Touring Daytona (GTD) categories. Action Express Racing (AER) fielded two Chevrolet Corvette DP cars while VisitFlorida Racing (VFR) and Wayne Taylor Racing (WTR) fielded one. Highway to Help entered one BMW-powered Riley MkXXVI. Mazda Motorsports had two Lola B12/80 cars, and the Extreme Speed Motorsports (ESM) and Michael Shank Racing (MSR) entered one Ligier JS P2 chassis with Honda HR35TT twin-turbocharged 3.5-liter V6 engines. Panoz brought the DeltaWing car after skipping the previous round at Belle Isle. The Prototype Challenge (PC) class was composed of seven Oreca FLM09 cars: two from Starworks Motorsports. BAR1 Motorsports, CORE Autosport, JDC-Miller MotorSports, Performance Tech and PR1/Mathiasen Motorsports entered one car each. GTLM was represented by ten entries from five different brands. In the list of GTD entrants, fourteen GT3-specification vehicles were represented by six different manufacturers.

== Practice ==
There were three practice sessions preceding the start of the race on Sunday, two on Friday and one on Saturday. The first two one-hour sessions were on Friday morning and afternoon. The third on Saturday morning lasted an hour.

In the first session, Negri set the fastest time in the No. 60 MSR Ligier with a time of 1 minute, 36.705 seconds, 0.387 seconds faster than Angelelli's No. 10 car. Dane Cameron was third fastest in the No. 31 AXR vehicle. The fastest PC class car was Colin Braun's No. 54 CORE Autosport car with 1 minute, 38.701 seconds, followed by Tom Kimber-Smith in the No. 52 PR/1 entry. BMW paced GTLM with BMW Team RLL's No. 25 BMW M6 GTLM of Dirk Werner lapping 1:43.574, ahead of the two Ford GTs. Robin Liddell in the No. 6 Steven Audi R8 was fastest in GTD with a time of 1 minute, 46.147 seconds.

In the second practice session, Pla led with a lap of 1 minute, 36.155 seconds, ahead of Bomarito's No. 55 Mazda. The seven-vehicle PC class was led by Starworks Motorsports No. 8 car, driven by Renger van der Zande with a time of 1 minute, 38.582 seconds. Ford occupied first and second in GTLM with Hand faster than his teammate Westbrook by less than one-tenth of a second. Aschenbach's No. 9 Steven Audi R8 led GTD, and Jens Klingmann in the No. 96 Turner Motorsport BMW, was second in class.

Derani led the final practice session in the No. 2 ESM car with a lap of 1 minute, 35.484 seconds. Bomarito's No. 55 Mazda was second-fastest. A 1:37.666 lap saw Braun's No. 54 CORE Autosport car lead PC. With a 1:42.129 lap, Westbrook led the GTLM class in the No. 67 CGR Ford GT, followed by Werner's No. 25 RLL BMW M6. Aschenbach led GTD with a time of 1:45.124.

== Qualifying ==
Saturday afternoon's 90-minute four-group qualifying session gave 15-minute sessions to all categories. Cars in GTD were sent out first before those grouped in GTLM, PC, and Prototype had three separate identically timed sessions. Regulations stipulated teams to nominate one qualifying driver, with the fastest laps determining each classes starting order. IMSA would arranged the grid to put all Prototypes ahead of the PC, GTLM, and GTD cars.

=== Qualifying results ===
Pole positions in each class are indicated in bold and by ‡.

Pos.	Class	No.	Team	Driver	Time	Gap	Grid
1	**P**	**2**	**(United States) Tequila Patrón ESM**	**(United States) Johannes van Overbeek**	**1:35.207**	–	1‡
2	P	55	(Japan) Mazda Motorsports	(United States) Tristan Nunez	1:35.374	+0.167	2
3	P	60	(United States) Michael Shank Racing with Curb-Agajanian	(Brazil) Oswaldo Negri Jr.	1:35.592	+0.385	3
4	P	10	(United States) Wayne Taylor Racing	(United States) Ricky Taylor	1:35.749	+0.542	4
5	P	70	(Japan) Mazda Motorsports	(United States) Tom Long	1:36.329	+1.122	5
6	P	5	(United States) Action Express Racing	(Brazil) Christian Fittipaldi	1:36.425	+1.218	6
7	P	90	(United States) VisitFlorida Racing	(United Kingdom) Ryan Dalziel	1:36.473	+1.266	7
8	P	31	(United States) Action Express Racing	(United States) Eric Curran	1:37.198	+1.991	8
9	**PC**	**8**	**(United States) Starworks Motorsport**	**(Netherlands) Renger van der Zande**	**1:38.407**	**+3.200**	9‡
10	P	0	(United States) Panoz DeltaWing Racing	(United Kingdom) Katherine Legge	1:38.520	+3.313	10
11	PC	52	(United States) PR1/Mathiasen Motorsports	(United States) Robert Alon	1:39.211	+4.004	11
12	PC	38	(United States) Performance Tech Motorsports	(United States) James French	1:39.363	+4.156	12
13	PC	20	(United States) BAR1 Motorsports	(United Kingdom) Johnny Mowlem	1:40.028	+4.821	13
14	PC	85	(United States) JDC-Miller MotorSports	(Canada) Misha Goikhberg	1:40.059	+4.852	14
15	PC	54	(United States) CORE Autosport	(United States) Jon Bennett	1:40.422	+5.215	15
16	**GTLM**	**67**	**(United States) Ford Chip Ganassi Racing**	**(United Kingdom) Richard Westbrook**	**1:41.301**	**+6.094**	17‡
17	GTLM	25	(United States) BMW Team RLL	(Germany) Dirk Werner	1:41.650	+6.443	18
18	P	50	(United States) Highway to Help	(United States) Jim Pace	1:41.901	+6.694	WD
19	GTLM	100	(United States) BMW Team RLL	(United States) John Edwards	1:41.905	+6.698	19
20	GTLM	66	(United States) Ford Chip Ganassi Racing	(United States) Joey Hand	1:41.969	+6.762	20
21	GTLM	68	(United States) Scuderia Corsa	(Italy) Alessandro Pier Guidi	1:42.706	+7.499	21
22	GTLM	4	(United States) Corvette Racing	(United States) Tommy Milner	1:42.794	+7.587	22
23	GTLM	62	(United States) Risi Competizione	(Finland) Toni Vilander	1:43.088	+7.881	23
24	GTLM	3	(United States) Corvette Racing	(Denmark) Jan Magnussen	1:43.135	+7.928	24
25	GTLM	911	(United States) Porsche North America	(United Kingdom) Nick Tandy	1:43.435	+8.228	25
26	GTLM	912	(United States) Porsche North America	(France) Frédéric Makowiecki	1:43.903	+8.696	26
27	GTD	6	(United States) Stevenson Motorsports	(United Kingdom) Robin Liddell	1:45.407	+10.200	38^{1}
28	**GTD**	**23**	**(United States) Team Seattle/Alex Job Racing**	**(Germany) Mario Farnbacher**	**1:45.449**	**+10.242**	27‡
29	GTD	9	(United States) Stevenson Motorsports	(United States) Lawson Aschenbach	1:45.594	+10.387	28
30	GTD	48	(United States) Paul Miller Racing	(United States) Madison Snow	1:46.175	+10.968	29
31	GTD	63	(United States) Scuderia Corsa	(Denmark) Christina Nielsen	1:46.205	+10.998	30
32	GTD	73	(United States) Park Place Motorsports	(United States) Matt McMurry	1:46.461	+11.254	31
33	GTD	16	(United States) Change Racing	(United States) Corey Lewis	1:46.507	+11.300	32
34	GTD	44	(United States) Magnus Racing	(United States) Andy Lally	1:46.768	+11.561	33
35	GTD	96	(United States) Turner Motorsport	(United States) Bret Curtis	1:46.828	+11.621	34
36	GTD	97	(United States) Turner Motorsport	(United States) Michael Marsal	1:46.982	+11.775	35
37	GTD	33	(United States) Riley Motorsports	(United States) Ben Keating	1:47.192	+11.985	37^{2}
38	PC	88	(United States) Starworks Motorsport	(United States) Mark Kvamme	1:47.391	+12.184	16
39	GTD	540	(United States) Black Swan Racing	(United States) Tim Pappas	1:48.106	+12.899	39^{3}
40	GTD	22	(United States) Alex Job Racing	(United States) Cooper MacNeil	1:48.208	+13.001	36
41	GTD	27	(United States) Dream Racing	Did Not Participate			WD
Sources:

- ^{1} The No. 6 Stevenson Motorsports Audi was sent to the rear of the GTD grid as per 13.1.2 of the Sporting regulations (Ride height).
- ^{2} The No. 33 Riley Motorsports Dodge was sent to the rear of the GTD grid as per 40.1.5 of the Sporting regulations (Tire change).
- ^{3} The No. 540 Black Swan Racing Porsche was sent to the rear of the GTD grid as per 40.1.5 of the Sporting regulations (Tire change).

== Race ==
=== Post-race ===
With a total of 187 points, Barbosa and Fittipaldi's victory allowed them to retake the lead of the Prototype Drivers' Championship. The final results of PC allowed Popow and van der Zande to extend their advantage in the Drivers' Championship to 13 points over Alon and Kimber-Smith. Gavin and Milner's fourth-place finish kept them atop the GTLM Drivers' Championship, but their advantage was reduced to 8 points as race winners Briscoe and Westbrook jumped to second place. Balzan and Nielsen's victory allowed them to extend their advantage in the GTD Drivers' Championship to 13 points over Farnbacher and Riberas. Keen and MacNeil advanced from sixth to fifth. Chevrolet continued to top their respective Manufactures' Championships while Ferrari became the leader of the GTD Manufactures' Championship. Starworks Motorsport, Corvette Racing, and Scuderia Corsa kept their respective advantages in their of Teams' Championships while Action Express Racing retook the lead of the Prototype Teams' Championship with six rounds left in the season.

=== Race results ===
Class winners are denoted in bold and ‡. P stands for Prototype, PC (Prototype Challenge), GTLM (Grand Touring Le Mans) and GTD (Grand Touring Daytona).

Final race classification
Pos	Class	No.	Team	Drivers	Chassis	Tire	Laps	Time/Retired
Pos	Class	No.	Team	Drivers	Engine	Tire	Laps	Time/Retired
1	**P**	**5**	**(United States) Action Express Racing**	**(Portugal) João Barbosa (Brazil) Christian Fittipaldi (Portugal) Filipe Albuquerque**	**Corvette Daytona Prototype**	C	**197**	**6:00:21.671‡**
1	**P**	**5**	**(United States) Action Express Racing**	**(Portugal) João Barbosa (Brazil) Christian Fittipaldi (Portugal) Filipe Albuquerque**	**Chevrolet 5.5 L V8**	C	**197**	**6:00:21.671‡**
2	P	31	(United States) Action Express Racing	(United States) Dane Cameron (United States) Eric Curran (Portugal) Filipe Albuquerque	Corvette Daytona Prototype	C	197	+0.709
2	P	31	(United States) Action Express Racing	(United States) Dane Cameron (United States) Eric Curran (Portugal) Filipe Albuquerque	Chevrolet 5.5 L V8	C	197	+0.709
3	P	60	(United States) Michael Shank Racing with Curb-Agajanian	(United States) John Pew (Brazil) Oswaldo Negri Jr. (France) Olivier Pla	Ligier JS P2	C	197	+1.048
3	P	60	(United States) Michael Shank Racing with Curb-Agajanian	(United States) John Pew (Brazil) Oswaldo Negri Jr. (France) Olivier Pla	Honda HR35TT 3.5 Turbo V6	C	197	+1.048
4	P	10	(United States) Wayne Taylor Racing	(United States) Ricky Taylor (United States) Jordan Taylor (Italy) Max Angelelli	Corvette Daytona Prototype	C	197	+7.302
4	P	10	(United States) Wayne Taylor Racing	(United States) Ricky Taylor (United States) Jordan Taylor (Italy) Max Angelelli	Chevrolet 5.5 L V8	C	197	+7.302
5	P	70	(Japan) Mazda Motorsports	(United States) Tom Long (United States) Joel Miller (United Kingdom) Ben Devlin	Mazda Prototype	C	196	+1 lap
5	P	70	(Japan) Mazda Motorsports	(United States) Tom Long (United States) Joel Miller (United Kingdom) Ben Devlin	Mazda MZ-2.0T 2.0 L I4 Turbo	C	196	+1 lap
6	P	90	(United States) VisitFlorida Racing	(Belgium) Marc Goossens (United Kingdom) Ryan Dalziel	Corvette Daytona Prototype	C	196	+1 lap
6	P	90	(United States) VisitFlorida Racing	(Belgium) Marc Goossens (United Kingdom) Ryan Dalziel	Chevrolet 5.5 L V8	C	196	+1 lap
7	**PC**	**8**	**(United States) Starworks Motorsport**	**(Venezuela) Alex Popow (Netherlands) Renger van der Zande**	**Oreca FLM09**	C	**195**	**+2 Laps‡**
7	**PC**	**8**	**(United States) Starworks Motorsport**	**(Venezuela) Alex Popow (Netherlands) Renger van der Zande**	**Chevrolet 6.2 L V8**	C	**195**	**+2 Laps‡**
8	PC	38	(United States) Performance Tech Motorsports	(United States) James French (Canada) Kyle Marcelli (United States) Kenton Koch	Oreca FLM09	C	195	+2 Laps
8	PC	38	(United States) Performance Tech Motorsports	(United States) James French (Canada) Kyle Marcelli (United States) Kenton Koch	Chevrolet 6.2 L V8	C	195	+2 Laps
9	PC	88	(United States) Starworks Motorsport	(United States) Mark Kvamme (Canada) Remo Ruscitti (United Kingdom) Richard Bradley	Oreca FLM09	C	195	+2 Laps
9	PC	88	(United States) Starworks Motorsport	(United States) Mark Kvamme (Canada) Remo Ruscitti (United Kingdom) Richard Bradley	Chevrolet 6.2 L V8	C	195	+2 Laps
10	PC	85	(United States) JDC-Miller MotorSports	(Canada) Misha Goikhberg (United States) Chris Miller (South Africa) Stephen Simpson	Oreca FLM09	C	194	+3 Laps
10	PC	85	(United States) JDC-Miller MotorSports	(Canada) Misha Goikhberg (United States) Chris Miller (South Africa) Stephen Simpson	Chevrolet 6.2 L V8	C	194	+3 Laps
11	**GTLM**	**67**	**(United States) Ford Chip Ganassi Racing**	**(Australia) Ryan Briscoe (United Kingdom) Richard Westbrook**	**Ford GT**	MI	**190**	**+7 Laps‡**
11	**GTLM**	**67**	**(United States) Ford Chip Ganassi Racing**	**(Australia) Ryan Briscoe (United Kingdom) Richard Westbrook**	**Ford EcoBoost 3.5 L Twin-turbo V6**	MI	**190**	**+7 Laps‡**
12	GTLM	66	(United States) Ford Chip Ganassi Racing	(Germany) Dirk Müller (United States) Joey Hand	Ford GT	MI	190	+7 Laps
12	GTLM	66	(United States) Ford Chip Ganassi Racing	(Germany) Dirk Müller (United States) Joey Hand	Ford EcoBoost 3.5 L Twin-turbo V6	MI	190	+7 Laps
13	GTLM	25	(United States) BMW Team RLL	(United States) Bill Auberlen (Germany) Dirk Werner	BMW M6 GTLM	MI	190	+7 Laps
13	GTLM	25	(United States) BMW Team RLL	(United States) Bill Auberlen (Germany) Dirk Werner	BMW 4.4 L Turbo V8	MI	190	+7 Laps
14	GTLM	4	(United States) Corvette Racing	(United Kingdom) Oliver Gavin (United States) Tommy Milner	Chevrolet Corvette C7.R	MI	190	+7 Laps
14	GTLM	4	(United States) Corvette Racing	(United Kingdom) Oliver Gavin (United States) Tommy Milner	Chevrolet LT5.5 5.5 L V8	MI	190	+7 Laps
15	GTLM	68	(United States) Scuderia Corsa	(Italy) Alessandro Pier Guidi (Brazil) Daniel Serra	Ferrari 488 GTE	MI	190	+7 Laps
15	GTLM	68	(United States) Scuderia Corsa	(Italy) Alessandro Pier Guidi (Brazil) Daniel Serra	Ferrari F154CB 3.9 L Turbo V8	MI	190	+7 Laps
16	GTLM	62	(United States) Risi Competizione	(Finland) Toni Vilander (Italy) Giancarlo Fisichella	Ferrari 488 GTE	MI	190	+7 Laps
16	GTLM	62	(United States) Risi Competizione	(Finland) Toni Vilander (Italy) Giancarlo Fisichella	Ferrari F154CB 3.9 L Turbo V8	MI	190	+7 Laps
17	GTLM	3	(United States) Corvette Racing	(Spain) Antonio García (Denmark) Jan Magnussen	Chevrolet Corvette C7.R	MI	190	+7 Laps
17	GTLM	3	(United States) Corvette Racing	(Spain) Antonio García (Denmark) Jan Magnussen	Chevrolet LT5.5 5.5 L V8	MI	190	+7 Laps
18	GTLM	100	(United States) BMW Team RLL	(United States) John Edwards (Germany) Lucas Luhr	BMW M6 GTLM	MI	190	+7 Laps
18	GTLM	100	(United States) BMW Team RLL	(United States) John Edwards (Germany) Lucas Luhr	BMW 4.4 L Turbo V8	MI	190	+7 Laps
19	GTLM	911	(United States) Porsche North America	(France) Patrick Pilet (United Kingdom) Nick Tandy	Porsche 911 RSR	MI	190	+7 Laps
19	GTLM	911	(United States) Porsche North America	(France) Patrick Pilet (United Kingdom) Nick Tandy	Porsche 4.0 L Flat-6	MI	190	+7 Laps
20	GTLM	912	(United States) Porsche North America	(New Zealand) Earl Bamber (France) Frédéric Makowiecki	Porsche 911 RSR	MI	188	+9 Laps
20	GTLM	912	(United States) Porsche North America	(New Zealand) Earl Bamber (France) Frédéric Makowiecki	Porsche 4.0 L Flat-6	MI	188	+9 Laps
21	P	0	(United States) Panoz DeltaWing Racing	(United Kingdom) Katherine Legge (United States) Sean Rayhall (Colombia) Gabby Chaves	DeltaWing DWC13	C	186	+11 Laps
21	P	0	(United States) Panoz DeltaWing Racing	(United Kingdom) Katherine Legge (United States) Sean Rayhall (Colombia) Gabby Chaves	Élan (Mazda) 1.9 L I4 Turbo	C	186	+11 Laps
22	**GTD**	**63**	**(United States) Scuderia Corsa**	**(Denmark) Christina Nielsen (Italy) Alessandro Balzan (United States) Jeff Segal**	**Ferrari 488 GT3**	C	**185**	**+12 Laps‡**
22	**GTD**	**63**	**(United States) Scuderia Corsa**	**(Denmark) Christina Nielsen (Italy) Alessandro Balzan (United States) Jeff Segal**	**Ferrari F154CB 3.9 L Turbo V8**	C	**185**	**+12 Laps‡**
23	GTD	44	(United States) Magnus Racing	(United States) John Potter (United States) Andy Lally (South Africa) Dion von Moltke	Audi R8 LMS	C	185	+12 Laps
23	GTD	44	(United States) Magnus Racing	(United States) John Potter (United States) Andy Lally (South Africa) Dion von Moltke	Audi 5.2L V10	C	185	+12 Laps
24	GTD	23	(United States) Team Seattle/Alex Job Racing	(Germany) Mario Farnbacher (Spain) Alex Riberas (United Kingdom) Ian James	Porsche 911 GT3 R	C	185	+12 Laps
24	GTD	23	(United States) Team Seattle/Alex Job Racing	(Germany) Mario Farnbacher (Spain) Alex Riberas (United Kingdom) Ian James	Porsche 4.0 L Flat-6	C	185	+12 Laps
25	GTD	33	(United States) Riley Motorsports	(Netherlands) Jeroen Bleekemolen (United States) Ben Keating	Dodge Viper GT3-R	C	184	+13 Laps
25	GTD	33	(United States) Riley Motorsports	(Netherlands) Jeroen Bleekemolen (United States) Ben Keating	Dodge 8.3L V10	C	184	+13 Laps
26	GTD	22	(United States) Alex Job Racing	(United States) Cooper MacNeil (United States) Leh Keen (United States) Gunnar Jeannette	Porsche 911 GT3 R	C	184	+13 Laps
26	GTD	22	(United States) Alex Job Racing	(United States) Cooper MacNeil (United States) Leh Keen (United States) Gunnar Jeannette	Porsche 4.0 L Flat-6	C	184	+13 Laps
27	GTD	9	(United States) Stevenson Motorsports	(United States) Lawson Aschenbach (United States) Matt Bell	Audi R8 LMS	C	184	+13 Laps
27	GTD	9	(United States) Stevenson Motorsports	(United States) Lawson Aschenbach (United States) Matt Bell	Audi 5.2L V10	C	184	+13 Laps
28	GTD	540	(United States) Black Swan Racing	(United States) Tim Pappas (Netherlands) Nicky Catsburg (United States) Andy Pilgrim	Porsche 911 GT3 R	C	184	+13 Laps
28	GTD	540	(United States) Black Swan Racing	(United States) Tim Pappas (Netherlands) Nicky Catsburg (United States) Andy Pilgrim	Porsche 4.0 L Flat-6	C	184	+13 Laps
29	P	55	(Japan) Mazda Motorsports	(United States) Jonathan Bomarito (United States) Tristan Nunez (United States) Spencer Pigot	Mazda Prototype	C	180	+17 Laps
29	P	55	(Japan) Mazda Motorsports	(United States) Jonathan Bomarito (United States) Tristan Nunez (United States) Spencer Pigot	Mazda MZ-2.0T 2.0 L I4 Turbo	C	180	+17 Laps
30	GTD	73	(United States) Park Place Motorsports	(United States) Patrick Lindsey (Germany) Jörg Bergmeister (United States) Matt McMurry	Porsche 911 GT3 R	C	173	+24 Laps
30	GTD	73	(United States) Park Place Motorsports	(United States) Patrick Lindsey (Germany) Jörg Bergmeister (United States) Matt McMurry	Porsche 4.0 L Flat-6	C	173	+24 Laps
31	GTD	16	(United States) Change Racing	(United States) Corey Lewis (United States) Spencer Pumpelly	Lamborghini Huracán GT3	C	168	+29 Laps
31	GTD	16	(United States) Change Racing	(United States) Corey Lewis (United States) Spencer Pumpelly	Lamborghini 5.2 L V10	C	168	+29 Laps
32	GTD	97	(United States) Turner Motorsport	(United States) Michael Marsal (Finland) Markus Palttala	BMW M6 GT3	C	160	+37 Laps
32	GTD	97	(United States) Turner Motorsport	(United States) Michael Marsal (Finland) Markus Palttala	BMW 4.4L Turbo V8	C	160	+37 Laps
33 DNF	P	2	(United States) Tequila Patrón ESM	(United States) Scott Sharp (United States) Johannes van Overbeek (Brazil) Pipo Derani	Ligier JS P2	C	158	Engine
33 DNF	P	2	(United States) Tequila Patrón ESM	(United States) Scott Sharp (United States) Johannes van Overbeek (Brazil) Pipo Derani	Honda HR35TT 3.5 Turbo V6	C	158	Engine
34 DNF	PC	52	(United States) PR1/Mathiasen Motorsports	(United Kingdom) Tom Kimber-Smith (Mexico) José Gutiérrez (United States) Robert Alon	Oreca FLM09	C	157	Electrical
34 DNF	PC	52	(United States) PR1/Mathiasen Motorsports	(United Kingdom) Tom Kimber-Smith (Mexico) José Gutiérrez (United States) Robert Alon	Chevrolet 6.2 L V8	C	157	Electrical
35 DNF	PC	54	(United States) CORE Autosport	(United States) Jon Bennett (United States) Colin Braun (Canada) Mark Wilkins	Oreca FLM09	C	130	Suspension
35 DNF	PC	54	(United States) CORE Autosport	(United States) Jon Bennett (United States) Colin Braun (Canada) Mark Wilkins	Chevrolet 6.2 L V8	C	130	Suspension
36 DNF	GTD	6	(United States) Stevenson Motorsports	(United States) Andrew Davis (United Kingdom) Robin Liddell	Audi R8 LMS	C	110	Engine
36 DNF	GTD	6	(United States) Stevenson Motorsports	(United States) Andrew Davis (United Kingdom) Robin Liddell	Audi 5.2L V10	C	110	Engine
37	GTD	48	(United States) Paul Miller Racing	(United States) Bryce Miller (United States) Bryan Sellers (United States) Madison Snow	Lamborghini Huracán GT3	C	91	+106 Laps
37	GTD	48	(United States) Paul Miller Racing	(United States) Bryce Miller (United States) Bryan Sellers (United States) Madison Snow	Lamborghini 5.2 L V10	C	91	+106 Laps
38 DNF	GTD	96	(United States) Turner Motorsport	(United States) Bret Curtis (Germany) Jens Klingmann	BMW M6 GT3	C	64	Boost
38 DNF	GTD	96	(United States) Turner Motorsport	(United States) Bret Curtis (Germany) Jens Klingmann	BMW 4.4L Turbo V8	C	64	Boost
39 DNF	PC	20	(United States) BAR1 Motorsports	(United Kingdom) Johnny Mowlem (United States) Marc Drumwright (United States) Don Yount	Oreca FLM09	C	19	Crash
39 DNF	PC	20	(United States) BAR1 Motorsports	(United Kingdom) Johnny Mowlem (United States) Marc Drumwright (United States) Don Yount	Chevrolet 6.2 L V8	C	19	Crash
DNS	P	50	(United States) Highway to Help	(United States) Jim Pace (United States) Byron DeFoor (United States) Dorsey Schroeder	Riley Mk XXVI DP	C	--	Did Not Start
DNS	P	50	(United States) Highway to Help	(United States) Jim Pace (United States) Byron DeFoor (United States) Dorsey Schroeder	Dinan (BMW) 5.0 L V8	C	--	Did Not Start
DNS	GTD	27	(United States) Dream Racing	(Monaco) Cédric Sbirrazzuoli (Italy) Luca Persiani (United States) Lawrence DeGeorge	Lamborghini Huracán GT3	C	--	Did Not Start
DNS	GTD	27	(United States) Dream Racing	(Monaco) Cédric Sbirrazzuoli (Italy) Luca Persiani (United States) Lawrence DeGeorge	Lamborghini 5.2 L V10	C	--	Did Not Start

Tyre manufacturers
Key
Symbol	Tyre manufacturer
**C**	Continental
**MI**	Michelin

== Championship standings after the race ==
Prototype Drivers' Championship standings
Pos.	+/–	Driver	Points
1	1	(Portugal) João Barbosa (Brazil) Christian Fittipaldi	187
2	1	(United States) Jordan Taylor (United States) Ricky Taylor	180
3		(United States) Eric Curran (United States) Dane Cameron	180
4		(Belgium) Marc Goossens	168
5	1	(Brazil) Oswaldo Negri Jr.	165

PC Drivers' Championship standings
Pos.	+/–	Driver	Points
1		(Venezuela) Alex Popow (Netherlands) Renger van der Zande	198
2		(United States) Robert Alon (United Kingdom) Tom Kimber-Smith	186
3		(South Africa) Stephen Simpson (Canada) Misha Goikhberg	182
4	1	(United States) Jon Bennett (United States) Colin Braun	152
5	1	(United States) James French (Canada) Kyle Marcelli	150

GTLM Drivers' Championship standings
Pos.	+/–	Driver	Points
1		(United Kingdom) Oliver Gavin (United States) Tommy Milner	159
2	1	(Australia) Ryan Briscoe (United Kingdom) Richard Westbrook	151
3	2	(United States) Bill Auberlen (Germany) Dirk Werner	141
4		(Brazil) Daniel Serra	140
5	3	(New Zealand) Earl Bamber (France) Frédéric Makowiecki	140

GTD Drivers' Championship standings
Pos.	+/–	Driver	Points
1		(Italy) Alessandro Balzan (Denmark) Christina Nielsen	162
2		(Germany) Mario Farnbacher (Spain) Alex Riberas	149
3		(United States) Andy Lally (United States) John Potter	141
4		(Netherlands) Jeroen Bleekemolen (United States) Ben Keating	134
5	1	(United States) Leh Keen (United States) Cooper MacNeil	121

- Note: Only the top five positions are included for all sets of standings.

Prototype Teams' Championship standings
Pos.	+/–	Team	Points
1	1	(United States) No. 5 Action Express Racing	187
2	1	(United States) No. 10 Wayne Taylor Racing	180
3		(United States) No. 31 Action Express Racing	180
4		(United States) No. 90 VisitFlorida Racing	168
5	1	(United States) No. 60 Michael Shank Racing with Curb-Agajanian	165

PC Teams' Championship standings
Pos.	+/–	Team	Points
1		(United States) No. 8 Starworks Motorsport	198
2		(United States) No. 52 PR1/Mathiasen Motorsports	186
3		(United States) No. 85 JDC-Miller MotorSports	182
4		(United States) No. 54 CORE Autosport	175
5		(United States) No. 38 Performance Tech Motorsports	175

GTLM Teams' Championship standings
Pos.	+/–	Team	Points
1		(United States) No. 4 Corvette Racing	159
2	1	(United States) No. 67 Ford Chip Ganassi Racing	151
3		(United States) No. 25 BMW Team RLL	141
4		(United States) No. 68 Scuderia Corsa	140
5	3	(United States) No. 912 Porsche North America	140

GTD Teams' Championship standings
Pos.	+/–	Team	Points
1		(United States) No. 63 Scuderia Corsa	162
2		(United States) No. 23 Team Seattle/Alex Job Racing	149
3		(United States) No. 44 Magnus Racing	141
4		(United States) No. 33 Riley Motorsports	134
5	1	(United States) No. 22 Alex Job Racing	121

- Note: Only the top five positions are included for all sets of standings.

Prototype Manufacturers' Championship standings
Pos.	+/–	Manufacturer	Points
1		(United States) Chevrolet	201
2		(Japan) Honda	197
3		(Japan) Mazda	180
4		(Germany) BMW	56
5		(United States) Ford	30

GTLM Manufacturers' Championship standings
Pos.	+/–	Manufacturer	Points
1		(United States) Chevrolet	160
2		(Germany) Porsche	153
3	1	(United States) Ford	150
4	1	(Italy) Ferrari	148
5		(Germany) BMW	144

GTD Manufacturers' Championship standings
Pos.	+/–	Manufacturer	Points
1	1	(Italy) Ferrari	157
2	1	(Germany) Porsche	157
3		(Germany) Audi	153
4		(United States) Dodge	142
5		(Germany) BMW	134

- Note: Only the top five positions are included for all sets of standings.

IMSA SportsCar Championship
Previous race: Chevrolet Sports Car Classic	2016 season	Next race: SportsCar Grand Prix
