= 2015 24 Hours of Daytona =

Previous: 2014	Next: 2016
Index: Races | Winners

The Daytona International Speedway road course

The 53rd Rolex 24 at Daytona was an endurance sports car racing event held at the Daytona International Speedway, Daytona Beach, Florida from 22–25 January 2015. The 53rd running of the 24 Hours of Daytona was also the first race for the 2015 United SportsCar Championship season.

== Qualifying ==
=== Qualifying results ===
Pole positions in each class are indicated in bold and by ‡. P stands for Prototype, PC (Prototype Challenge), GTLM (Grand Touring Le Mans) and GTD (Grand Touring Daytona).

Pos.	Class	No.	Team	Driver	Time	Gap	Grid
1	**P**	**60**	**(United States) Michael Shank Racing with Curb/Agajanian**	**(Brazil) Oswaldo Negri Jr.**	**1:39.194**	**_**	1‡
2	P	02	(United States) Chip Ganassi Racing	(New Zealand) Scott Dixon	1:39.302	+0.108	2
3	P	01	(United States) Chip Ganassi Racing	(United States) Scott Pruett	1:39.309	+0.115	3
4	P	5	(United States) Action Express Racing	(Portugal) João Barbosa	1:39.568	+0.374	4
5	P	0	(United States) DeltaWing Racing Cars with Claro/TracFone	(United Kingdom) Andy Meyrick	1:39.625	+0.431	5
6	P	57	(United States) Krohn Racing	(France) Olivier Pla	1:39.683	+0.489	6
7	P	10	(United States) Wayne Taylor Racing	(United States) Ricky Taylor	1:39.888	+0.694	7
8	P	7	(United States) Starworks Motorsport	(Brazil) Rubens Barrichello	1:40.260	+1.066	8
9	P	31	(United States) Action Express Racing	(Italy) Max Papis	1:40.322	+1.128	9
10	P	90	(United States) VisitFlorida.com Racing	(United Kingdom) Richard Westbrook	1:40.330	+1.136	24^{1}
11	P	66	(United States) RG Racing	(United States) Shane Lewis	1:42.070	+2.876	10
12	**PC**	**16**	**(United States) BAR1 Motorsports**	**(United Kingdom) Johnny Mowlem**	**1:42.318**	**+3.124**	11‡
13	P	2	(United States) Tequila Patrón ESM	(United States) Johannes van Overbeek	1:42.390	+3.196	12
14	PC	54	(United States) CORE Autosport	(United States) Colin Braun	1:42.498	+3.304	13
15	PC	52	(United States) PR1/Mathiasen Motorsports	(United Kingdom) Tom Kimber-Smith	1:42.829	+3.635	14
16	PC	8	(United States) Starworks Motorsport	(Netherlands) Renger van der Zande	1:43.322	+4.128	15
17	PC	61	(United States) BAR1 Motorsports	(United Kingdom) Martin Plowman	1:43.442	+4.248	16
18	**GTLM**	**4**	**(United States) Corvette Racing**	**(United Kingdom) Oliver Gavin**	**1:43.488**	**+4.294**	25‡
19	PC	85	(United States) JDC-Miller MotorSports	(South Africa) Stephen Simpson	1:43.514	+4.320	17
20	P	70	(United States) SpeedSource	(United States) Jonathan Bomarito	1:43.782	+4.588	18
21	GTLM	51	(Italy) AF Corse	(Italy) Gianmaria Bruni	1:43.830	+4.636	26
22	GTLM	98	(United Kingdom) Aston Martin Racing	(Portugal) Pedro Lamy	1:43.960	+4.766	27
23	GTLM	24	(United States) BMW Team RLL	(United States) John Edwards	1:43.966	+4.772	28
24	GTLM	3	(United States) Corvette Racing	(Denmark) Jan Magnussen	1:43.976	+4.782	29
25	GTLM	62	(United States) Risi Competizione	(Germany) Pierre Kaffer	1:43.986	+4.792	30
26	PC	11	(United States) RSR Racing	(Canada) Chris Cumming	1:43.992	+4.798	19
27	GTLM	25	(United States) BMW Team RLL	(United States) Bill Auberlen	1:44.024	+4.830	31
28	GTLM	911	(United States) Porsche North America	(United Kingdom) Nick Tandy	1:44.082	+4.888	32
29	P	50	(United States) Fifty Plus Racing	(United States) Jim Pace	1:44.423	+5.229	20
30	GTLM	17	(United States) Team Falken Tire	(United States) Bryan Sellers	1:44.465	+5.271	33
31	PC	38	(United States) Performance Tech Motorsports	(United States) James French	1:44.473	+5.279	21
32	GTLM	912	(United States) Porsche North America	(France) Frédéric Makowiecki	1:44.759	+5.565	34
33	**GTD**	**007**	**(United States) TRG-AMR North America**	**(Australia) James Davison**	**1:47.272**	**+8.078**	35‡
34	P	07	(United States) SpeedSource	(United States) Tom Long	1:47.320	+8.126	22
35	GTD	33	(United States) Riley Motorsports	(Netherlands) Jeroen Bleekemolen	1:47.424	+8.230	36
36	GTD	28	(Austria) Konrad Motorsport	(Austria) Christopher Zöchling	1:47.451	+8.257	37
37	GTD	58	(United States) Wright Motorsports	(Belgium) Jan Heylen	1:47.535	+8.341	38
38	GTD	64	(United States) Scuderia Corsa	(Brazil) Daniel Serra	1:47.805	+8.611	39
39	GTD	45	(United States) Flying Lizard Motorsports	(Germany) Markus Winkelhock	1:47.813	+8.619	40
40	GTD	73	(United States) Park Place Motorsports	(United States) Spencer Pumpelly	1:47.860	+8.666	41
41	GTD	44	(United States) Magnus Racing	(United States) Andy Lally	1:48.099	+8.905	42
42	GTD	63	(United States) Scuderia Corsa	(United States) Townsend Bell	1:48.117	+8.923	43
43	GTD	22	(United States) Alex Job Racing	(United States) Leh Keen	1:48.200	+9.006	44
44	GTD	48	(United States) Paul Miller Racing	(Germany) Christopher Haase	1:48.202	+9.008	45
45	GTD	49	(Italy) AF Corse	(Republic of Ireland) Matt Griffin	1:48.614	+9.420	46
46	GTD	23	(United States) Team Seattle / Alex Job Racing	(Germany) Mario Farnbacher	1:48.683	+9.489	47
47	GTD	19	(Belgium) Mühlner Motorsports America	(United States) Connor De Phillippi	1:49.035	+9.841	48
48	GTD	18	(Belgium) Mühlner Motorsports America	(Germany) Marc Basseng	1:49.291	+10.097	49
49	GTD	93	(United States) Riley Motorsports	(Canada) Kuno Wittmer	1:49.512	+10.318	53^{2}
50	GTD	97	(United States) Turner Motorsport	(Finland) Markus Palttala	1:50.213	+11.019	50
51	GTD	81	(United States) GB Autosport	(Republic of Ireland) Damien Faulkner	No Time Established		51
52	P	1	(United States) Tequila Patrón ESM	No Time Established			23
53	GTD	009	(United States) TRG-AMR North America	No Time Established			52
Sources:

- ^{1} The No. 90 VFR entry was moved to the back of the Prototype grid
- ^{2} The No. 93 Riley Motorsports Dodge had its fastest lap deleted as penalty for causing a red flag during its qualifying session and as per 40.1.5 of the Sporting regulations (Starting driver change).

== Results ==
=== Race ===
Final race classification
Pos	Class	No.	Team	Drivers	Chassis	Tire	Laps	Time/Retired
Pos	Class	No.	Team	Drivers	Engine	Tire	Laps	Time/Retired
1	P	02	(United States) Chip Ganassi Racing with Felix Sabates	(New Zealand) Scott Dixon (Brazil) Tony Kanaan (United States) Kyle Larson (United States) Jamie McMurray	Riley MkXXVI	C	740	24:00:57.667
1	P	02	(United States) Chip Ganassi Racing with Felix Sabates	(New Zealand) Scott Dixon (Brazil) Tony Kanaan (United States) Kyle Larson (United States) Jamie McMurray	Ford EcoBoost 3.5 L Turbo V6	C	740	24:00:57.667
2	P	5	(United States) Action Express Racing	(Portugal) João Barbosa (Brazil) Christian Fittipaldi (France) Sébastien Bourdais	Chevrolet Corvette DP	C	740	+ 1.333
2	P	5	(United States) Action Express Racing	(Portugal) João Barbosa (Brazil) Christian Fittipaldi (France) Sébastien Bourdais	Chevrolet LS9 5.5 L V8	C	740	+ 1.333
3	P	90	(United States) VisitFlorida.com Racing	(Canada) Michael Valiante (United Kingdom) Richard Westbrook (Germany) Mike Rockenfeller (United States) Guy Cosmo	Chevrolet Corvette DP	C	734	+ 6 Laps
3	P	90	(United States) VisitFlorida.com Racing	(Canada) Michael Valiante (United Kingdom) Richard Westbrook (Germany) Mike Rockenfeller (United States) Guy Cosmo	Chevrolet LS9 5.5 L V8	C	734	+ 6 Laps
4	GTLM	3	(United States) Corvette Racing	(Denmark) Jan Magnussen (Spain) Antonio Garcia (Australia) Ryan Briscoe	Chevrolet Corvette C7.R	M	725	+ 15 Laps
4	GTLM	3	(United States) Corvette Racing	(Denmark) Jan Magnussen (Spain) Antonio Garcia (Australia) Ryan Briscoe	Chevrolet LT5.5 5.5 L V8	M	725	+ 15 Laps
5	GTLM	25	(United States) BMW Team RLL	(United States) Bill Auberlen (Germany) Dirk Werner (Brazil) Augusto Farfus (Canada) Bruno Spengler	BMW Z4 GTE	M	725	+ 15 Laps
5	GTLM	25	(United States) BMW Team RLL	(United States) Bill Auberlen (Germany) Dirk Werner (Brazil) Augusto Farfus (Canada) Bruno Spengler	BMW 4.4 L V8	M	725	+ 15 Laps
6	P	31	(United States) Action Express Racing	(United States) Eric Curran (United States) Dane Cameron (Italy) Max Papis (United Kingdom) Phil Keen	Chevrolet Corvette DP	C	721	+ 19 Laps
6	P	31	(United States) Action Express Racing	(United States) Eric Curran (United States) Dane Cameron (Italy) Max Papis (United Kingdom) Phil Keen	Chevrolet LS9 5.5 L V8	C	721	+ 19 Laps
7	GTLM	4	(United States) Corvette Racing	(United States) Tommy Milner (United Kingdom) Oliver Gavin (France) Simon Pagenaud	Chevrolet Corvette C7.R	M	718	+ 22 Laps
7	GTLM	4	(United States) Corvette Racing	(United States) Tommy Milner (United Kingdom) Oliver Gavin (France) Simon Pagenaud	Chevrolet LT5.5 5.5 L V8	M	718	+ 22 Laps
8	PC	52	(United States) PR1/Mathiasen Motorsports	(United States) Mike Guasch (United States) Andrew Novich (United States) Andrew Palmer (United Kingdom) Tom Kimber-Smith	Oreca FLM09	C	714	+ 26 Laps
8	PC	52	(United States) PR1/Mathiasen Motorsports	(United States) Mike Guasch (United States) Andrew Novich (United States) Andrew Palmer (United Kingdom) Tom Kimber-Smith	Chevrolet 6.2 L V8	C	714	+ 26 Laps
9 DNF	P	60	(United States) Michael Shank Racing with Curb/Agajanian	(United States) John Pew (Brazil) Oswaldo Negri (United States) A. J. Allmendinger (United States) Matt McMurry	Ligier JS P2	C	705	a-arm
9 DNF	P	60	(United States) Michael Shank Racing with Curb/Agajanian	(United States) John Pew (Brazil) Oswaldo Negri (United States) A. J. Allmendinger (United States) Matt McMurry	Honda HR28TT 2.8 L Turbo V6	C	705	a-arm
10 DNF	PC	54	(United States) CORE Autosport	(United States) Colin Braun (United States) Jon Bennett (Canada) Mark Wilkins (United States) James Gue	Oreca FLM09	C	704	crash
10 DNF	PC	54	(United States) CORE Autosport	(United States) Colin Braun (United States) Jon Bennett (Canada) Mark Wilkins (United States) James Gue	Chevrolet 6.2 L V8	C	704	crash
11	GTD	93	(United States) Riley Motorsports	(United States) Ben Keating (Germany) Dominik Farnbacher (Canada) Kuno Wittmer (United States) Cameron Lawrence (United States) Al Carter	Dodge Viper GTS-R	C	704	+ 36 Laps
11	GTD	93	(United States) Riley Motorsports	(United States) Ben Keating (Germany) Dominik Farnbacher (Canada) Kuno Wittmer (United States) Cameron Lawrence (United States) Al Carter	Dodge 8.0 L V10	C	704	+ 36 Laps
12	GTD	22	(United States) Alex Job Racing	(United States) Cooper MacNeil (United States) Leh Keen (United States) Andrew Davis (New Zealand) Shane van Gisbergen	Porsche 911 GT America	C	704	+ 36 Laps
12	GTD	22	(United States) Alex Job Racing	(United States) Cooper MacNeil (United States) Leh Keen (United States) Andrew Davis (New Zealand) Shane van Gisbergen	Porsche 4.0 L Flat-6	C	704	+ 36 Laps
13	GTD	58	(United States) Wright Motorsports	(Belgium) Jan Heylen (United States) Madison Snow (United States) Patrick Dempsey (Austria) Philipp Eng	Porsche 911 GT America	C	702	+ 38 Laps
13	GTD	58	(United States) Wright Motorsports	(Belgium) Jan Heylen (United States) Madison Snow (United States) Patrick Dempsey (Austria) Philipp Eng	Porsche 4.0 L Flat-6	C	702	+ 38 Laps
14	GTLM	24	(United States) BMW Team RLL	(United States) John Edwards (Germany) Lucas Luhr (Germany) Jens Klingmann (United States) Graham Rahal	BMW Z4 GTE	M	701	+ 39 Laps
14	GTLM	24	(United States) BMW Team RLL	(United States) John Edwards (Germany) Lucas Luhr (Germany) Jens Klingmann (United States) Graham Rahal	BMW 4.4 L V8	M	701	+ 39 Laps
15	PC	85	(United States) JDC-Miller MotorSports	(United States) Rusty Mitchell (South Africa) Stephen Simpson (Canada) Misha Goikhberg (United States) Chris Miller (France) Tristan Vautier	Oreca FLM09	C	701	+ 39 Laps
15	PC	85	(United States) JDC-Miller MotorSports	(United States) Rusty Mitchell (South Africa) Stephen Simpson (Canada) Misha Goikhberg (United States) Chris Miller (France) Tristan Vautier	Chevrolet 6.2 L V8	C	701	+ 39 Laps
16	GTD	49	(Italy) AF Corse	(Thailand) Pasin Lathouras (Italy) Michele Rugolo (Portugal) Rui Águas (Republic of Ireland) Matt Griffin	Ferrari 458 Italia GT3	C	701	+ 39 Laps
16	GTD	49	(Italy) AF Corse	(Thailand) Pasin Lathouras (Italy) Michele Rugolo (Portugal) Rui Águas (Republic of Ireland) Matt Griffin	Ferrari 4.5 L V8	C	701	+ 39 Laps
17	GTD	48	(United States) Paul Miller Racing	(South Africa) Dion von Moltke (Germany) Christopher Haase (Germany) René Rast (United States) Bryce Miller	Audi R8 LMS	C	695	+ 45 Laps
17	GTD	48	(United States) Paul Miller Racing	(South Africa) Dion von Moltke (Germany) Christopher Haase (Germany) René Rast (United States) Bryce Miller	Audi 5.2 L V10	C	695	+ 45 Laps
18 DNF	GTD	63	(United States) Scuderia Corsa	(United States) Bill Sweedler (United States) Townsend Bell (United States) Anthony Lazzaro (United States) Jeff Segal (United States) Jeff Westphal	Ferrari 458 Italia GT3	C	691	clutch
18 DNF	GTD	63	(United States) Scuderia Corsa	(United States) Bill Sweedler (United States) Townsend Bell (United States) Anthony Lazzaro (United States) Jeff Segal (United States) Jeff Westphal	Ferrari 4.5 L V8	C	691	clutch
19	GTD	81	(United States) GB Autosport	(Republic of Ireland) Damien Faulkner (Poland) Kuba Giermaziak (United States) Mike Skeen (United Kingdom) Rory Butcher (United States) Michael Avenatti	Porsche 911 GT America	C	687	+ 53 Laps
19	GTD	81	(United States) GB Autosport	(Republic of Ireland) Damien Faulkner (Poland) Kuba Giermaziak (United States) Mike Skeen (United Kingdom) Rory Butcher (United States) Michael Avenatti	Porsche 4.0 L Flat-6	C	687	+ 53 Laps
20	GTD	009	(United States) TRG-AMR	(United States) Derek DeBoer (Canada) Max Riddle (Chile) Eliseo Salazar (United States) Kris Wilson (United States) Brandon Davis	Aston Martin V12 Vantage GT3	C	678	+ 62 Laps
20	GTD	009	(United States) TRG-AMR	(United States) Derek DeBoer (Canada) Max Riddle (Chile) Eliseo Salazar (United States) Kris Wilson (United States) Brandon Davis	Aston Martin 6.0 L V12	C	678	+ 62 Laps
21 DNF	GTD	33	(United States) Riley Motorsports	(United States) Ben Keating (Netherlands) Jeroen Bleekemolen (Netherlands) Sebastiaan Bleekemolen (United States) Al Carter (Belgium) Marc Goossens	Dodge Viper GTS-R	C	674	did not finish
21 DNF	GTD	33	(United States) Riley Motorsports	(United States) Ben Keating (Netherlands) Jeroen Bleekemolen (Netherlands) Sebastiaan Bleekemolen (United States) Al Carter (Belgium) Marc Goossens	Dodge 8.0 L V10	C	674	did not finish
22	GTD	45	(United States) Flying Lizard Motorsports	(Germany) Marcus Winkelhock (United States) Robert Thorne (Japan) Satoshi Hoshino (Japan) Tomonobu Fujii	Audi R8 LMS	C	670	+ 70 Laps
22	GTD	45	(United States) Flying Lizard Motorsports	(Germany) Marcus Winkelhock (United States) Robert Thorne (Japan) Satoshi Hoshino (Japan) Tomonobu Fujii	Audi 5.2 L V10	C	670	+ 70 Laps
23 DNF	P	01	(United States) Chip Ganassi Racing with Felix Sabates	(United States) Scott Pruett (United States) Joey Hand (United States) Charlie Kimball (United States) Sage Karam	Riley MkXXVI	C	669	clutch
23 DNF	P	01	(United States) Chip Ganassi Racing with Felix Sabates	(United States) Scott Pruett (United States) Joey Hand (United States) Charlie Kimball (United States) Sage Karam	Ford EcoBoost 3.5 L Turbo V6	C	669	clutch
24	P	66	(United States) RG Racing	(United States) Robert Gewirtz (United States) Shane Lewis (United States) Mark Kvamme (China) David Cheng	Riley MkXXVI	C	644	+ 96 Laps
24	P	66	(United States) RG Racing	(United States) Robert Gewirtz (United States) Shane Lewis (United States) Mark Kvamme (China) David Cheng	Dinan-BMW 5.0 L V8	C	644	+ 96 Laps
25	GTLM	911	(United States) Porsche North America	(United Kingdom) Nick Tandy (France) Patrick Pilet (Germany) Marc Lieb (Denmark) Michael Christensen	Porsche 911 RSR	M	640	+ 100 Laps
25	GTLM	911	(United States) Porsche North America	(United Kingdom) Nick Tandy (France) Patrick Pilet (Germany) Marc Lieb (Denmark) Michael Christensen	Porsche 4.0 L Flat-6	M	640	+ 100 Laps
26	GTLM	98	(United Kingdom) Aston Martin Racing	(United Kingdom) Darren Turner (Germany) Stefan Mücke (Austria) Mathias Lauda (Portugal) Pedro Lamy (Canada) Paul Dalla Lana	Aston Martin V8 Vantage GTE	M	632	+ 108 Laps
26	GTLM	98	(United Kingdom) Aston Martin Racing	(United Kingdom) Darren Turner (Germany) Stefan Mücke (Austria) Mathias Lauda (Portugal) Pedro Lamy (Canada) Paul Dalla Lana	Aston Martin 4.5 L V8	M	632	+ 108 Laps
27	GTD	44	(United States) Magnus Racing	(United States) Andy Lally (United States) John Potter (Germany) Marco Seefried (Austria) Martin Ragginger	Porsche 911 GT America	C	616	+ 124 Laps
27	GTD	44	(United States) Magnus Racing	(United States) Andy Lally (United States) John Potter (Germany) Marco Seefried (Austria) Martin Ragginger	Porsche 4.0 L Flat-6	C	616	+ 124 Laps
28	GTD	94	(United States) Turner Motorsport	(Finland) Markus Palttala (United States) Michael Marsal (United States) Boris Said (United Kingdom) Andy Priaulx	BMW Z4 GT3	C	604	+ 136 Laps
28	GTD	94	(United States) Turner Motorsport	(Finland) Markus Palttala (United States) Michael Marsal (United States) Boris Said (United Kingdom) Andy Priaulx	BMW 4.4 L V8	C	604	+ 136 Laps
29	GTD	007	(United States) TRG-AMR	(Australia) James Davison (Denmark) Christina Nielsen (Denmark) Christoffer Nygaard (United States) Brandon Davis	Aston Martin V12 Vantage GT3	C	593	+ 147 Laps
29	GTD	007	(United States) TRG-AMR	(Australia) James Davison (Denmark) Christina Nielsen (Denmark) Christoffer Nygaard (United States) Brandon Davis	Aston Martin 6.0 L V12	C	593	+ 147 Laps
30	P	50	(United States) Highway to Help	(United States) Dorsey Schroeder (United States) Jim Pace (United States) Byron DeFoor (United States) David Hinton (United States) Doug Smith	Riley MkXXVI	C	590	+ 150 Laps
30	P	50	(United States) Highway to Help	(United States) Dorsey Schroeder (United States) Jim Pace (United States) Byron DeFoor (United States) David Hinton (United States) Doug Smith	Dinan-BMW 5.0 L V8	C	590	+ 150 Laps
31 DNF	GTLM	912	(United States) Porsche North America	(Germany) Jörg Bergmeister (New Zealand) Earl Bamber (France) Frédéric Makowiecki (Denmark) Michael Christensen	Porsche 911 RSR	M	581	crash
31 DNF	GTLM	912	(United States) Porsche North America	(Germany) Jörg Bergmeister (New Zealand) Earl Bamber (France) Frédéric Makowiecki (Denmark) Michael Christensen	Porsche 4.0 L Flat-6	M	581	crash
32 DNF	GTD	64	(United States) Scuderia Corsa	(Brazil) Francisco Longo (Brazil) Daniel Serra (Brazil) Marcos Gomes (Italy) Andrea Bertolini	Ferrari 458 Italia GT3	C	545	crash
32 DNF	GTD	64	(United States) Scuderia Corsa	(Brazil) Francisco Longo (Brazil) Daniel Serra (Brazil) Marcos Gomes (Italy) Andrea Bertolini	Ferrari 4.5 L V8	C	545	crash
33	GTD	18	(United States) Mühlner Motorsports America	(Hong Kong) Darryl O'Young (Italy) Matteo Beretta (Germany) Marc Basseng (United States) Connor De Phillippi (Austria) Nikolaus Mayr-Melnhof	Porsche 911 GT America	C	539	+ 201 Laps
33	GTD	18	(United States) Mühlner Motorsports America	(Hong Kong) Darryl O'Young (Italy) Matteo Beretta (Germany) Marc Basseng (United States) Connor De Phillippi (Austria) Nikolaus Mayr-Melnhof	Porsche 4.0 L Flat-6	C	539	+ 201 Laps
34 DNF	PC	11	(United States) RSR Racing	(United Kingdom) Jack Hawksworth (Canada) Chris Cumming (Brazil) Bruno Junqueira (United States) Gustavo Menezes	Oreca FLM09	C	535	water pump
34 DNF	PC	11	(United States) RSR Racing	(United Kingdom) Jack Hawksworth (Canada) Chris Cumming (Brazil) Bruno Junqueira (United States) Gustavo Menezes	Chevrolet 6.2 L V8	C	535	water pump
35 DNF	GTD	73	(United States) Park Place Motorsports	(France) Kévin Estre (United States) Patrick Lindsey (United States) Jim Norman (United States) Spencer Pumpelly (Venezuela) Nelson Canache, Jr.	Porsche 911 GT America	C	532	gearbox
35 DNF	GTD	73	(United States) Park Place Motorsports	(France) Kévin Estre (United States) Patrick Lindsey (United States) Jim Norman (United States) Spencer Pumpelly (Venezuela) Nelson Canache, Jr.	Porsche 4.0 L Flat-6	C	532	gearbox
36 DNF	GTLM	17	(United States) Team Falken Tire	(United States) Bryan Sellers (Germany) Wolf Henzler (United States) Patrick Long	Porsche 911 RSR	F	530	drive train
36 DNF	GTLM	17	(United States) Team Falken Tire	(United States) Bryan Sellers (Germany) Wolf Henzler (United States) Patrick Long	Porsche 4.0 L Flat-6	F	530	drive train
37 DNF	P	7	(United States) Starworks Motorsport	(Brazil) Rubens Barrichello (New Zealand) Brendon Hartley (Thailand) Tor Graves (United States) Ryan Hunter-Reay (United States) Scott Mayer	Riley MkXXVI	C	426	engine
37 DNF	P	7	(United States) Starworks Motorsport	(Brazil) Rubens Barrichello (New Zealand) Brendon Hartley (Thailand) Tor Graves (United States) Ryan Hunter-Reay (United States) Scott Mayer	Dinan-BMW 5.0 L V8	C	426	engine
38	GTD	19	(United States) Mühlner Motorsports America	(United States) Jim Michaelian (United States) Michael Lira (Peru) Ricardo Flores, Jr. (United States) Connor De Phillippi (Austria) Nikolaus Mayr-Melnhof	Porsche 911 GT America	C	414	+ 326 Laps
38	GTD	19	(United States) Mühlner Motorsports America	(United States) Jim Michaelian (United States) Michael Lira (Peru) Ricardo Flores, Jr. (United States) Connor De Phillippi (Austria) Nikolaus Mayr-Melnhof	Porsche 4.0 L Flat-6	C	414	+ 326 Laps
39 DNF	P	1	(United States) Tequila Patrón ESM	(United States) Scott Sharp (United Kingdom) Ryan Dalziel (Denmark) David Heinemeier Hansson	HPD ARX-04b	C	389	gearbox
39 DNF	P	1	(United States) Tequila Patrón ESM	(United States) Scott Sharp (United Kingdom) Ryan Dalziel (Denmark) David Heinemeier Hansson	Honda HR28TT 2.8 L Turbo V6	C	389	gearbox
40 DNF	PC	61	(United States) BAR1 Motorsports	(United States) Shelby Blackstock (Netherlands) Ivo Breukers (United States) Marc Drumwright (United Kingdom) Martin Plowman (Canada) Remo Ruscitti	Oreca FLM09	C	361	engine
40 DNF	PC	61	(United States) BAR1 Motorsports	(United States) Shelby Blackstock (Netherlands) Ivo Breukers (United States) Marc Drumwright (United Kingdom) Martin Plowman (Canada) Remo Ruscitti	Chevrolet 6.2 L V8	C	361	engine
41 DNF	P	07	(United States) SpeedSource	(United States) Tom Long (United States) Joel Miller (United Kingdom) Ben Devlin (Canada) Sylvain Tremblay	Mazda Prototype	C	348	overheating
41 DNF	P	07	(United States) SpeedSource	(United States) Tom Long (United States) Joel Miller (United Kingdom) Ben Devlin (Canada) Sylvain Tremblay	Mazda Skyactiv-D 2.2 L Turbo I4 (Diesel)	C	348	overheating
42 DNF	GTLM	62	(United States) Risi Competizione	(Italy) Giancarlo Fisichella (Germany) Pierre Kaffer (Italy) Davide Rigon (Monaco) Olivier Beretta	Ferrari 458 Italia GT2	M	310	electrical
42 DNF	GTLM	62	(United States) Risi Competizione	(Italy) Giancarlo Fisichella (Germany) Pierre Kaffer (Italy) Davide Rigon (Monaco) Olivier Beretta	Ferrari 4.5 L V8	M	310	electrical
43 DNF	PC	8	(United States) Starworks Motorsport	(Netherlands) Renger van der Zande (Germany) Mirco Schultis (United States) Mike Hedlund (Venezuela) Alex Popow (Portugal) Filipe Albuquerque	Oreca FLM09	C	299	engine
43 DNF	PC	8	(United States) Starworks Motorsport	(Netherlands) Renger van der Zande (Germany) Mirco Schultis (United States) Mike Hedlund (Venezuela) Alex Popow (Portugal) Filipe Albuquerque	Chevrolet 6.2 L V8	C	299	engine
44 DNF	PC	38	(United States) Performance Tech Motorsports	(United States) James French (United States) Jerome Mee (Canada) James Vance (United States) Sean Johnston	Oreca FLM09	C	238	crash
44 DNF	PC	38	(United States) Performance Tech Motorsports	(United States) James French (United States) Jerome Mee (Canada) James Vance (United States) Sean Johnston	Chevrolet 6.2 L V8	C	238	crash
45 DNF	GTD	23	(United States) Team Seattle/Alex Job Racing	(United Kingdom) Ian James (Germany) Mario Farnbacher (Spain) Alex Riberas	Porsche 911 GT America	C	233	engine
45 DNF	GTD	23	(United States) Team Seattle/Alex Job Racing	(United Kingdom) Ian James (Germany) Mario Farnbacher (Spain) Alex Riberas	Porsche 4.0 L Flat-6	C	233	engine
46 DNF	GTLM	51	(Italy) AF Corse	(Italy) Gianmaria Bruni (Finland) Toni Vilander (France) François Perrodo (France) Emmanuel Collard	Ferrari 458 Italia GT2	M	211	crash
46 DNF	GTLM	51	(Italy) AF Corse	(Italy) Gianmaria Bruni (Finland) Toni Vilander (France) François Perrodo (France) Emmanuel Collard	Ferrari 4.5 L V8	M	211	crash
47 DNF	P	70	(United States) SpeedSource	(Canada) Sylvain Tremblay (United States) Tristan Nunez (United States) Jonathan Bomarito (Canada) James Hinchcliffe	Mazda Prototype	C	198	oil pressure
47 DNF	P	70	(United States) SpeedSource	(Canada) Sylvain Tremblay (United States) Tristan Nunez (United States) Jonathan Bomarito (Canada) James Hinchcliffe	Mazda Skyactiv-D 2.2 L Turbo I4 (Diesel)	C	198	oil pressure
48 DNF	GTD	28	(Austria) Konrad Motorsport	(Austria) Klaus Bachler (Austria) Christopher Zöchling (Germany) Christian Engelhart (United States) Lance Willsey (Switzerland) Rolf Ineichen	Porsche 911 GT America	C	176	did not finish
48 DNF	GTD	28	(Austria) Konrad Motorsport	(Austria) Klaus Bachler (Austria) Christopher Zöchling (Germany) Christian Engelhart (United States) Lance Willsey (Switzerland) Rolf Ineichen	Porsche 4.0 L Flat-6	C	176	did not finish
49 DNF	P	57	(United States) Krohn Racing	(United States) Tracy Krohn (Sweden) Niclas Jönsson (United Kingdom) Alex Brundle (France) Olivier Pla	Ligier JS P2	C	172	engine
49 DNF	P	57	(United States) Krohn Racing	(United States) Tracy Krohn (Sweden) Niclas Jönsson (United Kingdom) Alex Brundle (France) Olivier Pla	Judd HK 3.6 L V8	C	172	engine
50 DNF	P	2	(United States) Tequila Patrón ESM	(United States) Ed Brown (United States) Johannes van Overbeek (United States) Jon Fogarty	HPD ARX-04b	C	49	oil pressure
50 DNF	P	2	(United States) Tequila Patrón ESM	(United States) Ed Brown (United States) Johannes van Overbeek (United States) Jon Fogarty	Honda HR28TT 2.8 L Turbo V6	C	49	oil pressure
51 DNF	P	0	(United States) DeltaWing Racing Cars with Claro/TracFone	(United Kingdom) Andy Meyrick (United Kingdom) Katherine Legge (Mexico) Memo Rojas (Colombia) Gabby Chaves	DeltaWing DWC13	C	42	transmission
51 DNF	P	0	(United States) DeltaWing Racing Cars with Claro/TracFone	(United Kingdom) Andy Meyrick (United Kingdom) Katherine Legge (Mexico) Memo Rojas (Colombia) Gabby Chaves	Élan 1.9 L Turbo I4	C	42	transmission
DQ	P	10	(United States) Wayne Taylor Racing (Note: Car finished 3rd on track but was disqualified after breaching rules on maximum driving time for a single driver.)	(United States) Ricky Taylor (United States) Jordan Taylor (Italy) Max Angelelli	Chevrolet Corvette DP	C	740	+ 1:07.074
DQ	P	10	(United States) Wayne Taylor Racing	(United States) Ricky Taylor (United States) Jordan Taylor (Italy) Max Angelelli	Chevrolet LS9 5.5 L V8	C	740	+ 1:07.074
DQ	PC	16	(United States) BAR1 Motorsports (Note: Car finished 9th on track (2nd in class) but was disqualified after breaching rules on maximum driving time for a single driver.)	(United Kingdom) Johnny Mowlem (United States) Tom Papadopoulos (United States) Tomy Drissi (United States) Brian Alder (United Kingdom) Martin Plowman	Oreca FLM09	C	713	+ 27 Laps
DQ	PC	16	(United States) BAR1 Motorsports	(United Kingdom) Johnny Mowlem (United States) Tom Papadopoulos (United States) Tomy Drissi (United States) Brian Alder (United Kingdom) Martin Plowman	Chevrolet 6.2 L V8	C	713	+ 27 Laps

Tyre manufacturers
Key
Symbol	Tyre manufacturer
C	Continental
M	Michelin
F	Falken Tire

== Standings after the race ==
United SportsCar Championship
Previous race: None	2015 season	Next race: 12 Hours of Sebring
