= 2015 12 Hours of Sebring =

Sports car endurance race

Sebring International Raceway

The 63rd Mobil 1 12 Hours of Sebring Fueled by Fresh from Florida was an endurance sports car racing event held at Sebring International Raceway from March 18-21st. The race was the second round of the 2015 United SportsCar Championship as well as the second of four events in the North American Endurance Cup.

The race was won by Action Express Racing's No. 5 Corvette Daytona Prototype, piloted by Sébastien Bourdais, João Barbosa, and Christian Fittipaldi, finishing a full lap ahead of any else in the field. The Prototype Challenge class was won by the No. 52 entry from PR1/Mathiasen Motorsports piloted by Mike Guasch, Tom Kimber-Smith, and Andrew Palmer, securing their second consecutive victory in the season. In the GT Le Mans class, victory went to Corvette Racing's No. 3 Chevrolet Corvette C7.R driven by Antonio García, Ryan Briscoe, and Jan Magnussen. Finally, in GT Daytona, victory went to the No. 23 Porsche 911 GT America from Alex Job Racing and Team Seattle driven by Mario Farnbacher, Ian James, and Alex Riberas, though it only took the lead with roughly four minutes to go when the No. 33 Riley Motorsports Dodge Viper GT3-R suffered overheating issues.

== Practice ==
There were four practice sessions preceding the start of the race on Saturday, three on Thursday and one on Friday. The first two one-hour sessions were on Thursday morning and afternoon. The third held later that evening ran for 90 minutes; the fourth on Friday morning lasted an hour.

=== Practice 1 ===
The first practice session took place at 10:15 am ET on Thursday and ended with João Barbosa topping the charts for Action Express Racing, with a lap time of 1:52.485.

Pos.	Class	No.	Team	Driver	Time	Gap
1	P	5	Action Express Racing	João Barbosa	1:52.485	_
2	P	60	Michael Shank Racing with Curb/Agajanian	Oswaldo Negri Jr.	1:53.732	+1.247
3	P	57	Krohn Racing	Niclas Jönsson	1:53.871	+1.386

=== Practice 2 ===
The second practice session took place at 2:25 pm ET on Thursday and ended with Olivier Pla topping the charts for Krohn Racing, with a lap time of 1:52.731.

Pos.	Class	No.	Team	Driver	Time	Gap
1	P	57	Krohn Racing	Olivier Pla	1:52.731	_
2	P	60	Michael Shank Racing with Curb/Agajanian	Oswaldo Negri Jr.	1:53.554	+0.823
3	P	5	Action Express Racing	João Barbosa	1:53.818	+1.087

=== Night Practice ===
The night practice session took place at 7:15 pm ET on Thursday and ended with Olivier Pla topping the charts for Krohn Racing, with a lap time of 1:51.973.

Pos.	Class	No.	Team	Driver	Time	Gap
1	P	57	Krohn Racing	Olivier Pla	1:51.973	_
2	P	5	Action Express Racing	Sébastien Bourdais	1:52.246	+0.273
3	P	60	Michael Shank Racing with Curb/Agajanian	Oswaldo Negri Jr.	1:52.536	+0.563

=== Final Practice ===
The fourth and final practice session took place at 9:50 am ET on Friday and ended with Oswaldo Negri Jr. topping the charts for Michael Shank Racing with Curb/Agajanian, with a lap time of 1:52.096.

Pos.	Class	No.	Team	Time	Gap
1	P	60	Michael Shank Racing with Curb/Agajanian	1:52.096	_
2	P	57	Krohn Racing	1:52.578	+0.482
3	P	5	Action Express Racing	1:52.588	+0.492

== Qualifying ==
Qualifying was broken into four sessions. The first session of qualifying was for the GTD class. The No. 33 Riley Motorsports entry driven by Jeroen Bleekemolen set the fastest time in GTD.

The second session of qualifying was for the GTLM class. Frédéric Makowiecki qualified on pole for the class driving the No. 912 Porsche North America, besting Patrick Pilet in the No. 911 Porsche North America entry.

The third session of qualifying was for the PC class. Martin Plowman qualified on pole driving the No. 16 car for BAR1 Motorsports.

The final session of qualifying was for the P class. Olivier Pla qualified on pole driving the No. 57 car for Krohn Racing, beating Ryan Dalziel in the No. 1 Tequila Patrón ESM by just over three tenths of a second.

=== Qualifying results ===
Pole positions in each class are indicated in bold and by ‡.

Pos.	Class	No.	Team	Driver	Time	Gap	Grid
1	**P**	57	(United States) Krohn Racing	**(France) Olivier Pla**	**1:51.152**	**_**	1 ‡
2	P	1	(United States) Tequila Patrón ESM	(United Kingdom) Ryan Dalziel	1:51.455	+0.303	2
3	P	5	(United States) Action Express Racing	(Portugal) João Barbosa	1:52.128	+0.976	3
4	P	60	(United States) Michael Shank Racing with Curb/Agajanian	(Brazil) Oswaldo Negri Jr.	1:52.170	+1.018	4
5	P	31	(United States) Action Express Racing	(United States) Dane Cameron	1:52.490	+1.338	5
6	P	90	(United States) VisitFlorida.com Racing	(United Kingdom) Richard Westbrook	1:52.691	+1.539	6
7	P	10	(United States) Wayne Taylor Racing	(United States) Ricky Taylor	1:52.720	+1.568	7
8	P	2	(United States) Tequila Patrón ESM	(United States) Johannes van Overbeek	1:53.047	+1.895	8
9	P	01	(United States) Chip Ganassi Racing	(United States) Joey Hand	1:53.329	+2.177	9
10	P	0	(United States) DeltaWing Racing Cars with Claro/TracFone	(Mexico) Memo Rojas	1:55.223	+4.071	10
11	**PC**	**16**	**(United States) BAR1 Motorsports**	**(United Kingdom) Martin Plowman**	**1:55.257**	**+4.105**	11‡
12	PC	54	(United States) CORE Autosport	(United States) Colin Braun	1:55.327	+4.175	12
13	PC	52	(United States) PR1/Mathiasen Motorsports	(United Kingdom) Tom Kimber-Smith	1:55.416	+4.264	13
14	PC	38	(United States) Performance Tech Motorsports	(United States) Conor Daly	1:55.748	+4.596	14
15	PC	11	(United States) RSR Racing	(Canada) Chris Cumming	1:56.450	+5.298	15
16	PC	85	(United States) JDC-Miller MotorSports	(United States) Rusty Mitchell	1:57.248	+6.096	16
17	P	70	(United States) SpeedSource	(United States) Tristan Nunez	1:57.421	+6.269	17
18	PC	8	(United States) Starworks Motorsport	(Venezuela) Alex Popow	1:57.842	+6.690	18
19	**GTLM**	**912**	**(United States) Porsche North America**	**(France) Frédéric Makowiecki**	**1:58.587**	**+7.435**	19‡
20	GTLM	911	(United States) Porsche North America	(France) Patrick Pilet	1:58.806	+7.654	20
21	GTLM	3	(United States) Corvette Racing	(Spain) Antonio García	1:58.828	+7.676	21
22	GTLM	25	(United States) BMW Team RLL	(Germany) Dirk Werner	1:58.842	+7.690	22
23	GTLM	62	(United States) Risi Competizione	(Germany) Pierre Kaffer	1:58.927	+7.775	23
24	GTLM	24	(United States) BMW Team RLL	(Germany) Lucas Luhr	1:58.930	+7.778	24
25	GTLM	4	(United States) Corvette Racing	(United States) Tommy Milner	1:59.451	+8.299	25
26	GTLM	17	(United States) Team Falken Tire	(Germany) Wolf Henzler	1:59.787	+8.635	26
27	GTLM	98	(United Kingdom) Aston Martin Racing	(Portugal) Pedro Lamy	1:59.896	+8.744	27
28	**GTD**	**33**	**(United States) Riley Motorsports**	**(Netherlands) Jeroen Bleekemolen**	**2:03.485**	**+12.333**	28‡
29	GTD	23	(United States) Team Seattle/Alex Job Racing	(Germany) Mario Farnbacher	2:03.538	+12.386	29
30	GTD	73	(United States) Park Place Motorsports	(United States) Patrick Lindsey	2:04.106	+12.954	30
31	GTD	22	(United States) Alex Job Racing	(United States) Leh Keen	2:04.339	+13.187	31
32	GTD	007	(United States) TRG-AMR North America	(Australia) James Davison	2:04.855	+13.703	32
33	GTD	81	(United States) GB Autosport	(Republic of Ireland) Damien Faulkner	2:04.930	+13.778	33
34	GTD	44	(United States) Magnus Racing	(United States) Andy Lally	2:04.944	+13.792	34
35	GTD	58	(United States) Wright Motorsports	(Belgium) Jan Heylen	2:05.059	+13.907	35
36	GTD	93	(United States) Riley Motorsports	(United States) Ben Keating	2:05.081	+13.929	36
37	GTD	48	(United States) Paul Miller Racing	(United States) Bryce Miller	2:05.265	+14.113	37
38	GTD	45	(United States) Flying Lizard Motorsports	(Germany) Marco Holzer	2:05.499	+14.347	38
39	GTD	49	(Italy) AF Corse	(Italy) Marco Cioci	2:05.781	+14.629	39
40	GTD	63	(United States) Scuderia Corsa	(United States) Anthony Lazzaro	2:06.479	+15.327	40
41	GTD	97	(United States) Turner Motorsport	(United States) Boris Said	2:07.373	+16.221	41
42	P	07	(United States) SpeedSource	No Time Set			42
43	P	50	(United States) Fifty Plus Racing	No Time Set			43
44	P	7	(United States) Starworks Motorsport	Did Not Participate			44
45	GTD	18	(Belgium) Mühlner Motorsports America	Did Not Participate			45
46	GTD	009	(United States) TRG-AMR North America	Did Not Participate			46

== Post-race ==
=== Race result ===
Class winners are denoted in bold and ‡.

Final race classification
Pos	Class	No.	Team	Drivers	Chassis	Tire	Laps	Time/Retired
Pos	Class	No.	Team	Drivers	Engine	Tire	Laps	Time/Retired
1	**P**	**5**	**(United States) Action Express Racing**	**(Portugal) João Barbosa (Brazil) Christian Fittipaldi (France) Sébastien Bourdais**	**Coyote Corvette DP**	C	**340**	**12:01:40.097‡**
1	**P**	**5**	**(United States) Action Express Racing**	**(Portugal) João Barbosa (Brazil) Christian Fittipaldi (France) Sébastien Bourdais**	**Chevrolet 5.5 L V8**	C	**340**	**12:01:40.097‡**
2	P	10	(United States) Wayne Taylor Racing	(United States) Jordan Taylor (United States) Ricky Taylor (Italy) Max Angelelli	Dallara Corvette DP	C	339	+1 lap
2	P	10	(United States) Wayne Taylor Racing	(United States) Jordan Taylor (United States) Ricky Taylor (Italy) Max Angelelli	Chevrolet 5.5 L V8	C	339	+1 lap
3	P	90	(United States) VisitFlorida.com Racing	(United Kingdom) Richard Westbrook (Canada) Michael Valiante (Germany) Mike Rockenfeller	Coyote Corvette DP	C	339	+1 lap
3	P	90	(United States) VisitFlorida.com Racing	(United Kingdom) Richard Westbrook (Canada) Michael Valiante (Germany) Mike Rockenfeller	Chevrolet 5.5 L V8	C	339	+1 lap
4	P	01	(United States) Chip Ganassi Racing	(United States) Joey Hand (United States) Scott Pruett (New Zealand) Scott Dixon	Ford EcoBoost Riley DP	C	339	+1 lap
4	P	01	(United States) Chip Ganassi Racing	(United States) Joey Hand (United States) Scott Pruett (New Zealand) Scott Dixon	Ford EcoBoost 3.5 L V6 Turbo	C	339	+1 lap
5	P	31	(United States) Action Express Racing	(United States) Eric Curran (United States) Dane Cameron (Italy) Max Papis	Coyote Corvette DP	C	338	+2 Laps
5	P	31	(United States) Action Express Racing	(United States) Eric Curran (United States) Dane Cameron (Italy) Max Papis	Chevrolet 5.5 L V8	C	338	+2 Laps
6	**PC**	**52**	**(United States) PR1/Mathiasen Motorsports**	**(United States) Mike Guasch (United States) Andrew Palmer (United Kingdom) Tom Kimber-Smith**	**Oreca FLM09**	C	**334**	**+6 Laps‡**
6	**PC**	**52**	**(United States) PR1/Mathiasen Motorsports**	**(United States) Mike Guasch (United States) Andrew Palmer (United Kingdom) Tom Kimber-Smith**	**Chevrolet LS3 6.2 L V8**	C	**334**	**+6 Laps‡**
7	PC	54	(United States) CORE Autosport	(United States) Jon Bennett (United States) Colin Braun (United States) James Gue	Oreca FLM09	C	334	+6 Laps
7	PC	54	(United States) CORE Autosport	(United States) Jon Bennett (United States) Colin Braun (United States) James Gue	Chevrolet LS3 6.2 L V8	C	334	+6 Laps
8	P	57	(United States) Krohn Racing	(United States) Tracy Krohn (Sweden) Niclas Jönsson (France) Olivier Pla	Ligier JS P2	C	334	+6 Laps
8	P	57	(United States) Krohn Racing	(United States) Tracy Krohn (Sweden) Niclas Jönsson (France) Olivier Pla	Judd HK 3.6 L V8	C	334	+6 Laps
9	PC	38	(United States) Performance Tech Motorsports	(United States) Jerome Mee (United States) James French (United States) Conor Daly	Oreca FLM09	C	333	+7 Laps
9	PC	38	(United States) Performance Tech Motorsports	(United States) Jerome Mee (United States) James French (United States) Conor Daly	Chevrolet LS3 6.2 L V8	C	333	+7 Laps
10	**GTLM**	**3**	**(United States) Corvette Racing**	**(Spain) Antonio García (Denmark) Jan Magnussen (Australia) Ryan Briscoe**	**Chevrolet Corvette C7.R**	MI	**330**	**+10 Laps‡**
10	**GTLM**	**3**	**(United States) Corvette Racing**	**(Spain) Antonio García (Denmark) Jan Magnussen (Australia) Ryan Briscoe**	**Chevrolet 5.5 L V8**	MI	**330**	**+10 Laps‡**
11	GTLM	62	(United States) Risi Competizione	(Germany) Pierre Kaffer (Italy) Giancarlo Fisichella (Italy) Andrea Bertolini	Ferrari 458 Italia GT2	MI	330	+10 Laps
11	GTLM	62	(United States) Risi Competizione	(Germany) Pierre Kaffer (Italy) Giancarlo Fisichella (Italy) Andrea Bertolini	Ferrari F142 4.5 L V8	MI	330	+10 Laps
12	GTLM	17	(United States) Team Falken Tire	(United States) Bryan Sellers (Germany) Wolf Henzler (United States) Patrick Long	Porsche 911 RSR	FAL	329	+11 Laps
12	GTLM	17	(United States) Team Falken Tire	(United States) Bryan Sellers (Germany) Wolf Henzler (United States) Patrick Long	Porsche 4.0 L Flat-6	FAL	329	+11 Laps
13	GTLM	24	(United States) BMW Team RLL	(United States) John Edwards (Germany) Lucas Luhr (Germany) Jens Klingmann	BMW Z4 GTE	MI	329	+11 Laps
13	GTLM	24	(United States) BMW Team RLL	(United States) John Edwards (Germany) Lucas Luhr (Germany) Jens Klingmann	BMW 4.4 L V8	MI	329	+11 Laps
14	GTLM	911	(United States) Porsche North America	(United Kingdom) Nick Tandy (France) Patrick Pilet (Austria) Richard Lietz (New Zealand) Earl Bamber	Porsche 911 RSR	MI	328	+12 Laps
14	GTLM	911	(United States) Porsche North America	(United Kingdom) Nick Tandy (France) Patrick Pilet (Austria) Richard Lietz (New Zealand) Earl Bamber	Porsche 4.0 L Flat-6	MI	328	+12 Laps
15	**GTD**	**23**	**(United States) Team Seattle/Alex Job Racing**	**(United Kingdom) Ian James (Germany) Mario Farnbacher (Spain) Alex Riberas**	**Porsche 911 GT America**	C	**318**	**+22 Laps‡**
15	**GTD**	**23**	**(United States) Team Seattle/Alex Job Racing**	**(United Kingdom) Ian James (Germany) Mario Farnbacher (Spain) Alex Riberas**	**Porsche 4.0 L Flat 6**	C	**318**	**+22 Laps‡**
16	GTD	007	(United States) TRG-AMR North America	(Denmark) Christina Nielsen (Australia) James Davison (United States) Brandon Davis	Aston Martin Vantage GT3	C	318	+22 Laps
16	GTD	007	(United States) TRG-AMR North America	(Denmark) Christina Nielsen (Australia) James Davison (United States) Brandon Davis	Aston Martin 6.0 L V12	C	318	+22 Laps
17	GTLM	98	(United Kingdom) Aston Martin Racing	(Canada) Paul Dalla Lana (Portugal) Pedro Lamy (United Kingdom) Darren Turner (Austria) Mathias Lauda	Aston Martin Vantage GTE	MI	318	+22 Laps
17	GTLM	98	(United Kingdom) Aston Martin Racing	(Canada) Paul Dalla Lana (Portugal) Pedro Lamy (United Kingdom) Darren Turner (Austria) Mathias Lauda	Aston Martin 4.5 L V8	MI	318	+22 Laps
18	GTD	63	(United States) Scuderia Corsa	(United States) Bill Sweedler (United States) Townsend Bell (United States) Anthony Lazzaro	Ferrari 458 Italia GT3	C	318	+22 Laps
18	GTD	63	(United States) Scuderia Corsa	(United States) Bill Sweedler (United States) Townsend Bell (United States) Anthony Lazzaro	Ferrari 4.5 L V8	C	318	+22 Laps
19	GTD	93	(United States) Riley Motorsports	(United States) Al Carter (Belgium) Marc Goossens (United States) Ben Keating (United States) Cameron Lawrence	Dodge Viper GT3-R	C	317	+23 Laps
19	GTD	93	(United States) Riley Motorsports	(United States) Al Carter (Belgium) Marc Goossens (United States) Ben Keating (United States) Cameron Lawrence	Dodge 8.3 L V10	C	317	+23 Laps
20	GTD	48	(United States) Paul Miller Racing	(Germany) Christopher Haase (United States) Bryce Miller (South Africa) Dion von Moltke	Audi R8 LMS Ultra	C	317	+23 Laps
20	GTD	48	(United States) Paul Miller Racing	(Germany) Christopher Haase (United States) Bryce Miller (South Africa) Dion von Moltke	Audi 5.2 L V10	C	317	+23 Laps
21	GTLM	912	(United States) Porsche North America	(Germany) Jörg Bergmeister (New Zealand) Earl Bamber (France) Frédéric Makowiecki (United Kingdom) Nick Tandy	Porsche 911 RSR	MI	317	+23 Laps
21	GTLM	912	(United States) Porsche North America	(Germany) Jörg Bergmeister (New Zealand) Earl Bamber (France) Frédéric Makowiecki (United Kingdom) Nick Tandy	Porsche 4.0 L Flat-6	MI	317	+23 Laps
22	GTLM	25	(United States) BMW Team RLL	(United States) Bill Auberlen (Germany) Dirk Werner (Brazil) Augusto Farfus	BMW Z4 GTE	MI	317	+23 Laps
22	GTLM	25	(United States) BMW Team RLL	(United States) Bill Auberlen (Germany) Dirk Werner (Brazil) Augusto Farfus	BMW 4.4 L V8	MI	317	+23 Laps
23	GTD	58	(United States) Wright Motorsports	(United States) Madison Snow (Belgium) Jan Heylen (Costa Rica) Emilio Valverde	Porsche 911 GT America	C	316	+24 Laps
23	GTD	58	(United States) Wright Motorsports	(United States) Madison Snow (Belgium) Jan Heylen (Costa Rica) Emilio Valverde	Porsche 4.0 L Flat-6	C	316	+24 Laps
24	GTD	22	(United States) Alex Job Racing	(United States) Cooper MacNeil (United States) Leh Keen (United States) Andrew Davis	Porsche 911 GT America	C	316	+24 Laps
24	GTD	22	(United States) Alex Job Racing	(United States) Cooper MacNeil (United States) Leh Keen (United States) Andrew Davis	Porsche 4.0 L Flat-6	C	316	+24 Laps
25	GTD	97	(United States) Turner Motorsport	(United States) Michael Marsal (Finland) Markus Palttala (United Kingdom) Andy Priaulx (United States) Boris Said	BMW Z4 GT3	C	315	+25 Laps
25	GTD	97	(United States) Turner Motorsport	(United States) Michael Marsal (Finland) Markus Palttala (United Kingdom) Andy Priaulx (United States) Boris Said	BMW 4.4 L V8	C	315	+25 Laps
26 DNF	GTD	33	(United States) Riley Motorsports	(United States) Ben Keating (Netherlands) Jeroen Bleekemolen (Netherlands) Sebastiaan Bleekemolen	Dodge Viper GT3-R	C	314	Did Not Finish
26 DNF	GTD	33	(United States) Riley Motorsports	(United States) Ben Keating (Netherlands) Jeroen Bleekemolen (Netherlands) Sebastiaan Bleekemolen	Dodge 8.3 L V10	C	314	Did Not Finish
27	P	50	(United States) Fifty Plus Racing	(United States) Jim Pace (United States) Bryon DeFoor (United States) David Hinton (United States) Dorsey Schroeder	Riley Mk XXVI DP	C	309	+31 Laps
27	P	50	(United States) Fifty Plus Racing	(United States) Jim Pace (United States) Bryon DeFoor (United States) David Hinton (United States) Dorsey Schroeder	Dinan (BMW) 5.0 L V8	C	309	+31 Laps
28	GTD	49	(Italy) AF Corse	(Italy) Piergiuseppe Perazzini (Italy) Marco Cioci (Portugal) Rui Águas (Venezuela) Enzo Potolicchio	Ferrari 458 Italia GT3	C	308	+32 Laps
28	GTD	49	(Italy) AF Corse	(Italy) Piergiuseppe Perazzini (Italy) Marco Cioci (Portugal) Rui Águas (Venezuela) Enzo Potolicchio	Ferrari 4.5 L V8	C	308	+32 Laps
29 DNF	PC	85	(United States) JDC-Miller MotorSports	(Canada) Misha Goikhberg (United States) Chris Miller (United States) Rusty Mitchell (United States) Gerry Kraut	Oreca FLM09	C	290	Did Not Finish
29 DNF	PC	85	(United States) JDC-Miller MotorSports	(Canada) Misha Goikhberg (United States) Chris Miller (United States) Rusty Mitchell (United States) Gerry Kraut	Chevrolet LS3 6.2 L V8	C	290	Did Not Finish
30	PC	8	(United States) Starworks Motorsport	(Netherlands) Renger van der Zande (Germany) Mirco Schultis (Venezuela) Alex Popow	Oreca FLM09	C	280	+60 Laps
30	PC	8	(United States) Starworks Motorsport	(Netherlands) Renger van der Zande (Germany) Mirco Schultis (Venezuela) Alex Popow	Chevrolet LS3 6.2 L V8	C	280	+60 Laps
31 DNF	PC	11	(United States) RSR Racing	(Brazil) Bruno Junqueira (Canada) Chris Cumming (United States) Gustavo Menezes	Oreca FLM09	C	267	Did Not Finish
31 DNF	PC	11	(United States) RSR Racing	(Brazil) Bruno Junqueira (Canada) Chris Cumming (United States) Gustavo Menezes	Chevrolet LS3 6.2 L V8	C	267	Did Not Finish
32 DNF	GTLM	4	(United States) Corvette Racing	(United Kingdom) Oliver Gavin (United States) Tommy Milner (France) Simon Pagenaud	Chevrolet Corvette C7.R	MI	264	Did Not Finish
32 DNF	GTLM	4	(United States) Corvette Racing	(United Kingdom) Oliver Gavin (United States) Tommy Milner (France) Simon Pagenaud	Chevrolet 5.5 L V8	MI	264	Did Not Finish
33 DNF	P	2	(United States) Tequila Patrón ESM	(United States) Ed Brown (United States) Johannes van Overbeek (United States) Jon Fogarty	HPD ARX-03b	C	211	Did Not Finish
33 DNF	P	2	(United States) Tequila Patrón ESM	(United States) Ed Brown (United States) Johannes van Overbeek (United States) Jon Fogarty	Honda HR28TT 2.8 L V6 Turbo	C	211	Did Not Finish
34	PC	16	(United States) BAR1 Motorsports	(United States) Marc Drumwright (United States) Tomy Drissi (China) David Cheng (United Kingdom) Martin Plowman	Oreca FLM09	C	194	+146 Laps
34	PC	16	(United States) BAR1 Motorsports	(United States) Marc Drumwright (United States) Tomy Drissi (China) David Cheng (United Kingdom) Martin Plowman	Chevrolet LS3 6.2 L V8	C	194	+146 Laps
35 DNF	GTD	44	(United States) Magnus Racing	(United States) John Potter (United States) Andy Lally (Germany) Marco Seefried	Porsche 911 GT America	C	179	Did Not Finish
35 DNF	GTD	44	(United States) Magnus Racing	(United States) John Potter (United States) Andy Lally (Germany) Marco Seefried	Porsche 4.0 L Flat-6	C	179	Did Not Finish
36 DNF	P	1	(United States) Tequila Patrón ESM	(United States) Scott Sharp (United Kingdom) Ryan Dalziel (Denmark) David Heinemeier Hansson	HPD ARX-03b	C	162	Did Not Finish
36 DNF	P	1	(United States) Tequila Patrón ESM	(United States) Scott Sharp (United Kingdom) Ryan Dalziel (Denmark) David Heinemeier Hansson	Honda HR28TT 2.8 L V6 Turbo	C	162	Did Not Finish
37 DNF	GTD	73	(United States) Park Place Motorsports	(United States) Patrick Lindsey (United States) Spencer Pumpelly (United States) Jim Norman	Porsche 911 GT America	C	155	Did Not Finish
37 DNF	GTD	73	(United States) Park Place Motorsports	(United States) Patrick Lindsey (United States) Spencer Pumpelly (United States) Jim Norman	Porsche 4.0 L Flat-6	C	155	Did Not Finish
38 DNF	P	70	(United States) Speedsource	(United States) Tristan Nunez (United States) Jonathan Bomarito (Canada) Sylvain Tremblay	Mazda Prototype	C	111	Did Not Finish
38 DNF	P	70	(United States) Speedsource	(United States) Tristan Nunez (United States) Jonathan Bomarito (Canada) Sylvain Tremblay	Mazda 2.2 L SKYACTIV-D (SH-VPTS) I4 Turbo (diesel)	C	111	Did Not Finish
39 DNF	P	07	(United States) Speedsource	(United States) Tom Long (United States) Joel Miller (United Kingdom) Ben Devlin (Canada) Sylvain Tremblay	Mazda Prototype	C	104	Did Not Finish
39 DNF	P	07	(United States) Speedsource	(United States) Tom Long (United States) Joel Miller (United Kingdom) Ben Devlin (Canada) Sylvain Tremblay	Mazda 2.2 L SKYACTIV-D (SH-VPTS) I4 Turbo (diesel)	C	104	Did Not Finish
40 DNF	GTD	81	(United States) GB Autosport	(Republic of Ireland) Damien Faulkner (United States) Mike Skeen (United States) Michael Avenatti (Poland) Kuba Giermaziak	Porsche 911 GT America	C	97	Did Not Finish
40 DNF	GTD	81	(United States) GB Autosport	(Republic of Ireland) Damien Faulkner (United States) Mike Skeen (United States) Michael Avenatti (Poland) Kuba Giermaziak	Porsche 4.0 L Flat-6	C	97	Did Not Finish
41 DNF	P	0	(United States) DeltaWing Racing Cars with Claro/TracFone	(Mexico) Memo Rojas (United Kingdom) Katherine Legge (United Kingdom) Andy Meyrick	DeltaWing DWC13	C	60	Did Not Finish
41 DNF	P	0	(United States) DeltaWing Racing Cars with Claro/TracFone	(Mexico) Memo Rojas (United Kingdom) Katherine Legge (United Kingdom) Andy Meyrick	Élan (Mazda) 1.9 L I4 Turbo	C	60	Did Not Finish
42 DNF	P	60	(United States) Michael Shank Racing with Curb/Agajanian	(United States) John Pew (Brazil) Oswaldo Negri Jr. (United Kingdom) Justin Wilson	Ligier JS P2	C	46	Did Not Finish
42 DNF	P	60	(United States) Michael Shank Racing with Curb/Agajanian	(United States) John Pew (Brazil) Oswaldo Negri Jr. (United Kingdom) Justin Wilson	Honda HR28TT 2.8 L V6 Turbo	C	46	Did Not Finish
43 DNF	GTD	45	(United States) Flying Lizard Motorsports	(Germany) Marco Holzer (United States) Robert Thorne (United States) Colin Thompson	Audi R8 LMS Ultra	C	23	Did Not Finish
43 DNF	GTD	45	(United States) Flying Lizard Motorsports	(Germany) Marco Holzer (United States) Robert Thorne (United States) Colin Thompson	Audi 5.2 L V10	C	23	Did Not Finish
DNS	P	7	(United States) Starworks Motorsport	(United States) Scott Mayer (New Zealand) Brendon Hartley	Riley Mk XXVI DP	C	-	Did not start
DNS	P	7	(United States) Starworks Motorsport	(United States) Scott Mayer (New Zealand) Brendon Hartley	Dinan (BMW) 5.0 L V8	C	-	Did not start
DNS	GTD	18	(United States) Mühlner Motorsports America		Porsche 911 GT America	C	-	Did not start
DNS	GTD	18	(United States) Mühlner Motorsports America		Porsche 4.0 L Flat-6	C	-	Did not start
DNS	GTD	009	(United States) TRG-AMR North America		Aston Martin Vantage GT3	C	-	Did not start
DNS	GTD	009	(United States) TRG-AMR North America		Aston Martin 6.0 L V12	C	-	Did not start

Tyre manufacturers
Key
Symbol	Tyre manufacturer
**C**	Continental
**MI**	Michelin
**FAL**	Falken Tire

United SportsCar Championship
Previous race: 24 Hours of Daytona	2015 season	Next race: Tequila Patrón Sports Car Showcase
