= 2015 Tequila Patrón Sports Car Showcase =

Third round of the 2015 United SportsCar Championship season

The layout of the Long Beach Street Circuit

The 2015 Tequila Patrón Sports Car Showcase was a sports car race sanctioned by the International Motor Sports Association (IMSA). It was held at Long Beach Street Circuit in Long Beach, California on 18 April 2015. The race was the third round of the 2015 Tudor United SportsCar Championship.

== Background ==
The event was run as a support race to the Grand Prix of Long Beach, the annual IndyCar Series race held at the circuit. The Pirelli World Challenge and Stadium Super Trucks also ran during the weekend. The race was also the joint-shortest of the season, at just 100 minutes, identical to the Chevrolet Sports Car Classic.

=== Entries ===
A total of 17 cars took part in the event; 9 in the Prototype (P) class and 8 in the GT Le Mans (GTLM) class. The Prototype Challenge (PC) and GT Daytona (GTD) classes would not be participating in the event. After only competing on permanent circuits since its competition debut in 2012, The DeltaWing would make its first appearance at a street course. Due to scheduling conflicts for full-season drivers Nick Tandy and Earl Bamber, who were preparing for their LMP1 debut in the FIA World Endurance Championship, drivers Frédéric Makowiecki and Richard Lietz would replace them for the Long Beach event.

== Practice ==
There were two practice sessions preceding the start of the race on Saturday, both on Friday. The first session lasted two hours on Friday morning while the second session on Friday afternoon lasted 35 minutes.

=== Practice 1 ===
The first practice session at 7:45 am PT on Friday and ended with Dane Cameron topping the charts for Action Express Racing, with a lap time of 1:16.063.

Pos.	Class	No.	Team	Driver	Time	Gap
1	P	31	Action Express Racing	Dane Cameron	1:16.063	_
2	P	90	VisitFlorida.com Racing	Richard Westbrook	1:16.141	+0.078
3	P	5	Action Express Racing	João Barbosa	1:16.159	+0.096

=== Final Practice ===
The second and final practice session took place at 4:45 pm PT on Friday and ended with Ricky Taylor topping the charts for Wayne Taylor Racing, with a lap time of 1:15.879.

Pos.	Class	No.	Team	Driver	Time	Gap
1	P	10	Wayne Taylor Racing	Ricky Taylor	1:15.879	_
2	P	01	Chip Ganassi Racing	Scott Pruett	1:16.165	+0.286
3	P	90	VisitFlorida.com Racing	Eric Curran	1:16.447	+0.568

== Qualifying ==
Qualifying was broken into two sessions. The first session of qualifying was for the GTLM class. Bill Auberlen qualified on pole in GTLM driving the No. 25 BMW Team RLL entry.

The final session of qualifying was for the P class. Ricky Taylor qualified on pole driving the No. 10 car for Wayne Taylor Racing.

=== Qualifying results ===
Pole positions in each class are indicated in bold and by ‡.

Pos.	Class	No.	Team	Driver	Time	Gap	Grid
1	**P**	**10**	**(United States) Wayne Taylor Racing**	**(United States) Ricky Taylor**	**1:14.790**	**_**	1‡
2	P	01	(United States) Chip Ganassi Racing	(United States) Scott Pruett	1:15.048	+0.258	2
3	P	5	(United States) Action Express Racing	(Brazil) Christian Fittipaldi	1:15.274	+0.484	3
4	P	90	(United States) VisitFlorida.com Racing	(Canada) Michael Valiante	1:15.553	+0.763	4
5	P	31	(United States) Action Express Racing	(United States) Eric Curran	1:15.915	+1.125	5
6	**GTLM**	**25**	**(United States) BMW Team RLL**	**(United States) Bill Auberlen**	**1:17.268**	**+2.478**	6‡
7	P	0	(United States) DeltaWing Racing Cars with Claro/TracFone	(Mexico) Memo Rojas	1:17.405	+2.615	7
8	P	60	(United States) Michael Shank Racing with Curb/Agajanian	(United States) John Pew	1:17.427	+2.637	8
9	GTLM	24	(United States) BMW Team RLL	(United States) John Edwards	1:17.516	+2.726	9
10	GTLM	62	(United States) Risi Competizione	(Italy) Giancarlo Fisichella	1:17.709	+2.919	10
11	GTLM	3	(United States) Corvette Racing	(Denmark) Jan Magnussen	1:17.739	+2.949	11
12	GTLM	4	(United States) Corvette Racing	(United Kingdom) Oliver Gavin	1:17.756	+2.966	12
13	GTLM	912	(United States) Porsche North America	(Austria) Richard Lietz	1:17.932	+3.142	16
14	GTLM	911	(United States) Porsche North America	(France) Patrick Pilet	1:18.185	+3.395	17
15	GTLM	17	(United States) Team Falken Tire	(United States) Bryan Sellers	1:18.728	+3.938	13
16	P	70	(United States) SpeedSource	did not participate			14
17	P	07	(United States) SpeedSource	did not participate			15

== Results ==
Class winners are denoted in bold and ‡.

Final race classification
Pos	Class	No.	Team	Drivers	Chassis	Tire	Laps	Time/Retired
Pos	Class	No.	Team	Drivers	Engine	Tire	Laps	Time/Retired
1	**P**	**10**	**(United States) Wayne Taylor Racing**	**(United States) Jordan Taylor (United States) Ricky Taylor**	**Corvette Daytona Prototype**	C	**78**	**1:40:59.571‡**
1	**P**	**10**	**(United States) Wayne Taylor Racing**	**(United States) Jordan Taylor (United States) Ricky Taylor**	**Chevrolet 5.5 L V8**	C	**78**	**1:40:59.571‡**
2	P	01	(United States) Chip Ganassi Racing	(United States) Joey Hand (United States) Scott Pruett	Ford EcoBoost Riley DP	C	78	+3.300
2	P	01	(United States) Chip Ganassi Racing	(United States) Joey Hand (United States) Scott Pruett	Ford EcoBoost 3.5 L V6 Turbo	C	78	+3.300
3	P	90	(United States) VisitFlorida.com Racing	(United Kingdom) Richard Westbrook (Canada) Michael Valiante	Corvette Daytona Prototype	C	78	+18.242
3	P	90	(United States) VisitFlorida.com Racing	(United Kingdom) Richard Westbrook (Canada) Michael Valiante	Chevrolet 5.5 L V8	C	78	+18.242
4	P	31	(United States) Action Express Racing	(United States) Eric Curran (United States) Dane Cameron	Corvette Daytona Prototype	C	78	+21.864
4	P	31	(United States) Action Express Racing	(United States) Eric Curran (United States) Dane Cameron	Chevrolet 5.5 L V8	C	78	+21.864
5	P	5	(United States) Action Express Racing	(Portugal) João Barbosa (Brazil) Christian Fittipaldi	Corvette Daytona Prototype	C	78	+50.468
5	P	5	(United States) Action Express Racing	(Portugal) João Barbosa (Brazil) Christian Fittipaldi	Chevrolet 5.5 L V8	C	78	+50.468
6	P	60	(United States) Michael Shank Racing with Curb/Agajanian	(United States) John Pew (Brazil) Oswaldo Negri Jr.	Ligier JS P2	C	76	+2 laps
6	P	60	(United States) Michael Shank Racing with Curb/Agajanian	(United States) John Pew (Brazil) Oswaldo Negri Jr.	Honda HR28TT 2.8 L V6 Turbo	C	76	+2 laps
7	**GTLM**	**25**	**(United States) BMW Team RLL**	**(United States) Bill Auberlen (Germany) Dirk Werner**	**BMW Z4 GTE**	MI	**76**	**+2 Laps ‡**
7	**GTLM**	**25**	**(United States) BMW Team RLL**	**(United States) Bill Auberlen (Germany) Dirk Werner**	BMW 4.4 L V8	MI	**76**	**+2 Laps ‡**
8	GTLM	62	(United States) Risi Competizione	(Germany) Pierre Kaffer (Italy) Giancarlo Fisichella	Ferrari 458 Italia GT2	MI	76	+2 Laps
8	GTLM	62	(United States) Risi Competizione	(Germany) Pierre Kaffer (Italy) Giancarlo Fisichella	Ferrari 4.5 L V8	MI	76	+2 Laps
9	GTLM	3	(United States) Corvette Racing	(Spain) Antonio García (Denmark) Jan Magnussen	Chevrolet Corvette C7.R	MI	75	+3 Laps
9	GTLM	3	(United States) Corvette Racing	(Spain) Antonio García (Denmark) Jan Magnussen	Chevrolet LT5.5 5.5 L V8	MI	75	+3 Laps
10	GTLM	911	(United States) Porsche North America	(France) Frédéric Makowiecki (France) Patrick Pilet	Porsche 911 RSR	MI	75	+3 Laps
10	GTLM	911	(United States) Porsche North America	(France) Frédéric Makowiecki (France) Patrick Pilet	Porsche 4.0 L Flat-6	MI	75	+3 Laps
11	GTLM	24	(United States) BMW Team RLL	(United States) John Edwards (Germany) Lucas Luhr	BMW Z4 GTE	MI	75	+3 laps
11	GTLM	24	(United States) BMW Team RLL	(United States) John Edwards (Germany) Lucas Luhr	BMW 4.4 L V8	MI	75	+3 laps
12	GTLM	17	(United States) Team Falken Tire	(United States) Bryan Sellers (Germany) Wolf Henzler	Porsche 911 RSR	FAL	75	+3 Laps
12	GTLM	17	(United States) Team Falken Tire	(United States) Bryan Sellers (Germany) Wolf Henzler	Porsche 4.0 L Flat-6	FAL	75	+3 Laps
13	P	07	(United States) SpeedSource	(United States) Tom Long (United States) Joel Miller	Mazda Prototype	C	75	+3 Laps
13	P	07	(United States) SpeedSource	(United States) Tom Long (United States) Joel Miller	Mazda Skyactiv-D 2.2 L Turbo I4 (Diesel)	C	75	+3 Laps
14	GTLM	4	(United States) Corvette Racing	(United Kingdom) Oliver Gavin (United States) Tommy Milner	Chevrolet Corvette C7.R	MI	74	+4 Laps
14	GTLM	4	(United States) Corvette Racing	(United Kingdom) Oliver Gavin (United States) Tommy Milner	Chevrolet LT5.5 5.5 L V8	MI	74	+4 Laps
15	P	70	(United States) SpeedSource	(United States) Jonathan Bomarito (United States) Tristan Nunez	Mazda Prototype	C	74	+4 Laps
15	P	70	(United States) SpeedSource	(United States) Jonathan Bomarito (United States) Tristan Nunez	Mazda Skyactiv-D 2.2 L Turbo I4 (Diesel)	C	74	+4 Laps
16	GTLM	912	(United States) Porsche North America	(Germany) Jörg Bergmeister (Austria) Richard Lietz	Porsche 911 RSR	MI	60	+18 Laps
16	GTLM	912	(United States) Porsche North America	(Germany) Jörg Bergmeister (Austria) Richard Lietz	Porsche 4.0 L Flat-6	MI	60	+18 Laps
17	P	0	(United States) DeltaWing Racing Cars with Claro/TracFone	(Mexico) Memo Rojas (United Kingdom) Katherine Legge	DeltaWing DWC13	C	9	Did not finish
17	P	0	(United States) DeltaWing Racing Cars with Claro/TracFone	(Mexico) Memo Rojas (United Kingdom) Katherine Legge	Élan (Mazda) 1.9 L I4 Turbo	C	9	Did not finish

Tyre manufacturers
Key
Symbol	Tyre manufacturer
**C**	Continental
**MI**	Michelin
**FAL**	Falken Tire

United SportsCar Championship
Previous race: 12 Hours of Sebring	2015 season	Next race: Monterey Grand Prix
