= Dinan Cars =

Automotive company

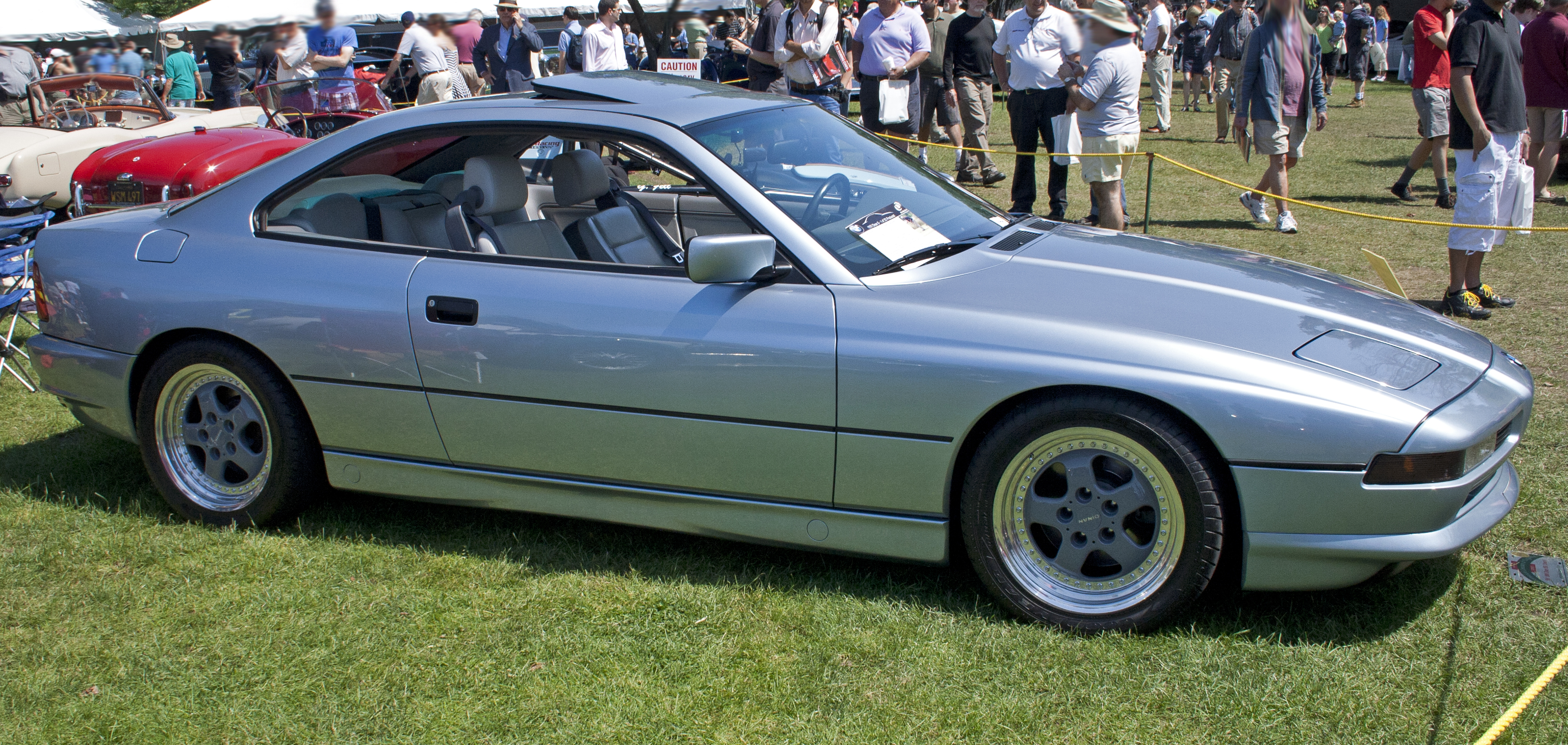
1991 Dinan 8, one of fifty built

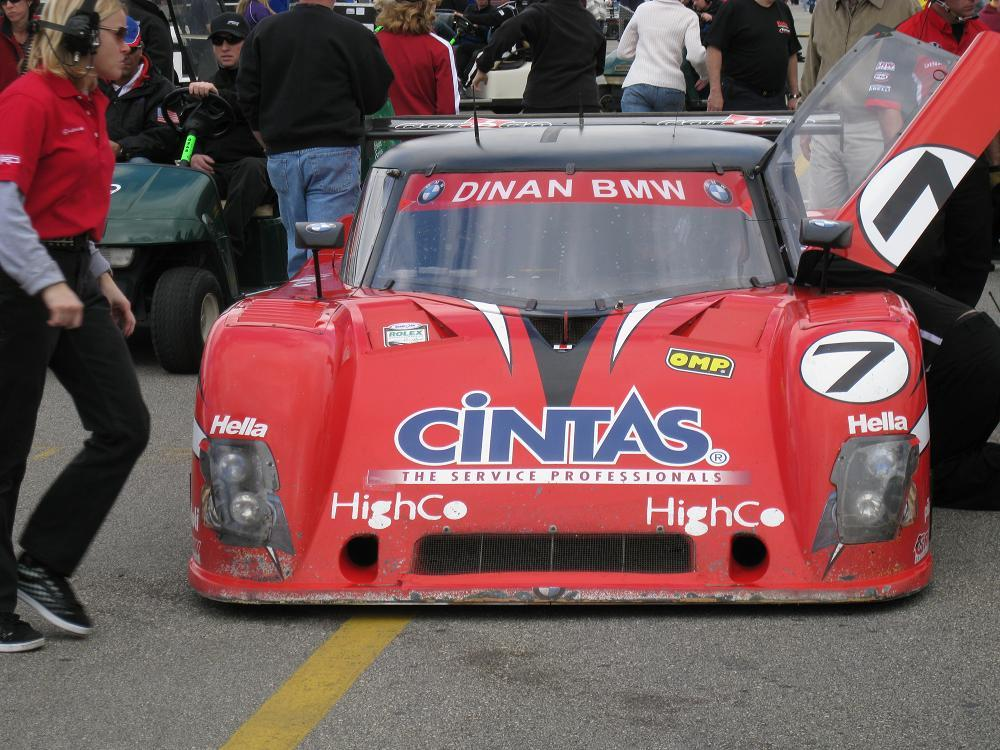
BMW Dinan 2008 team SigalSport Daytona Prototype.

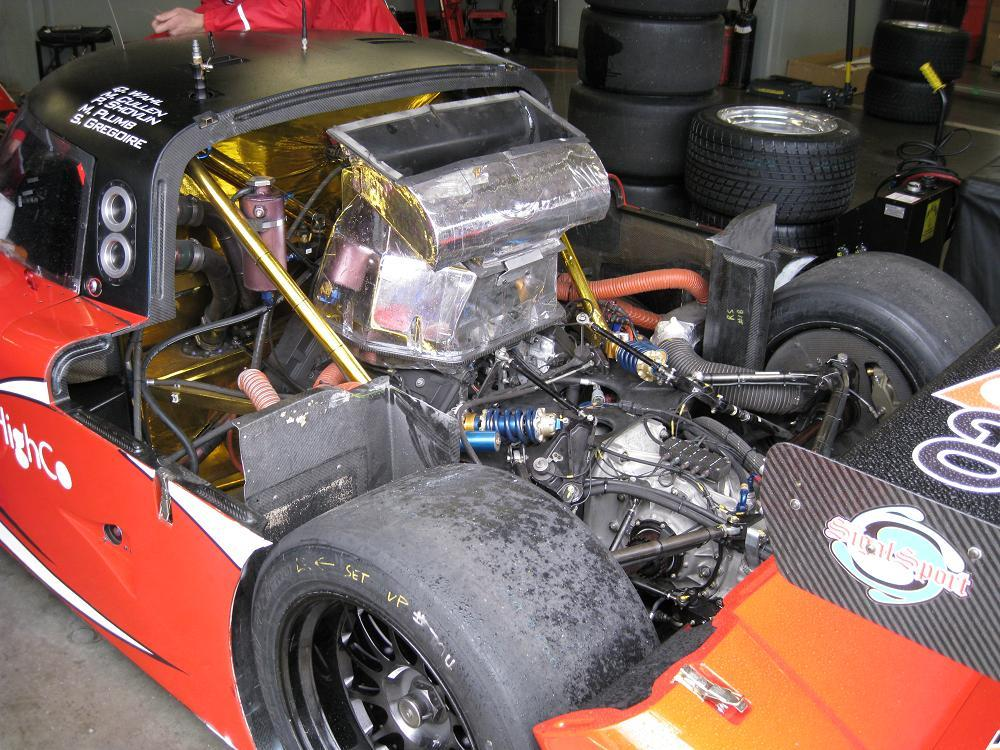
BMW Dinan E39 M5 S62 engine in 2008 team SigalSport Daytona Prototype.

Dinan Cars is a company specializing in the design and manufacturing of aftermarket performance parts for BMW automobiles. The company was founded in 1979 by Steve Dinan, and is headquartered in Opelika, Alabama.

Its performance parts are marketed through a network of authorized BMW dealers, independent auto repair shops, and their website. Dinan-modified vehicles retain factory warranty coverage. 180 locations in the United States sell Dinan parts or cars, including 150 BMW dealerships.

Until 2006, Dinan designed and manufactured performance parts for the Mini Cooper line. In addition, Dinan has had a history of building BMW racing engines for teams competing in the Grand-Am Rolex Sports Car Series Daytona Prototype class up until 2013.

== History ==
Dinan was founded in 1979 by Steven Dinan, an engineering student at the time. It was incorporated in 1982 as Bavarian Performance, Inc. in Morgan Hill, California., and was renamed Dinan Engineering, Inc. in 1988.

In 2013, Steve Dinan sold Dinan to private equity group Driven Performance Brands.

In 2015, Steve Dinan left the company, and was succeeded as president by Brian Applegate.

In 2018, Dinan relocated from Morgan Hill, California, to Opelika, Alabama, as part of a consolidation plan.
