= 2026 Sahlen's Six Hours of The Glen =

Sixth round of the 2026 IMSA SportsCar Championship season

The layout of Watkins Glen International, where the race will be held.

The 2026 Sahlen's Six Hours of The Glen was a sports car race held at Watkins Glen International in Dix, New York, on June 28, 2026. It was the sixth round of the 2026 IMSA SportsCar Championship, and the third round of the Michelin Endurance Cup.

== Background ==
=== Preview ===
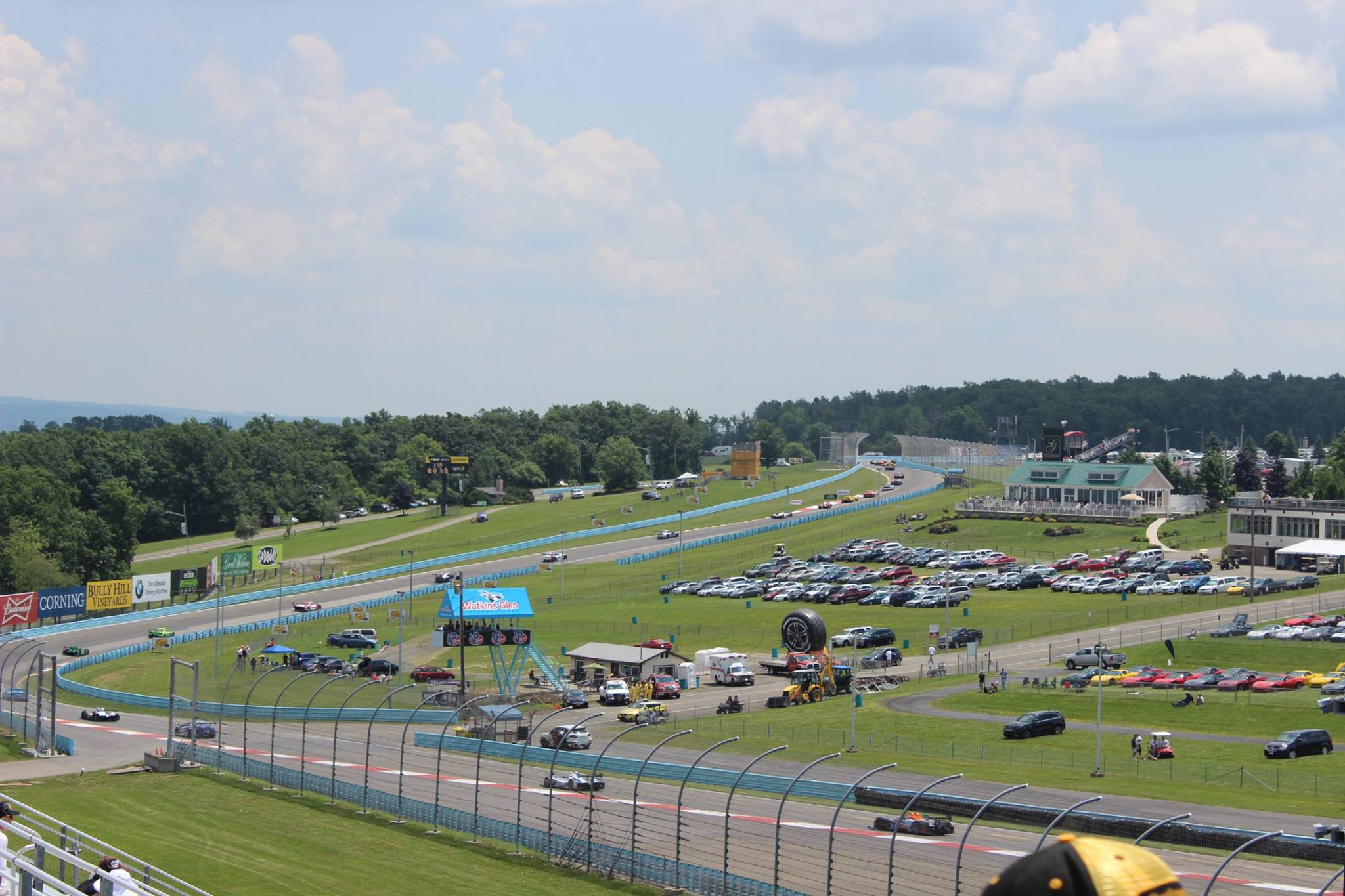
Watkins Glen International, where the race will be held.

International Motor Sports Association (IMSA) president John Doonan confirmed the race was part of the 2026 IMSA SportsCar Championship (IMSA SCC) in March 2025. It will be the twelfth time the IMSA SCC hosts a race at Watkins Glen. The 2026 Sahlen's Six Hours of The Glen will be the sixth of nine scheduled sports car races of 2026 by IMSA. The race will be held at the eleven-turn 3.450 mi (5.552 km) Watkins Glen International on June 28, 2026.

=== Standings before the race ===
The GTP Drivers' Championship is currently being led by Jack Aitken with 1760 points, 144 ahead of second-placed Laurin Heinrich. Julien Andlauer and Felipe Nasr sit 154 points behind Aitken in third place. Paul di Resta, Dan Goldburg and Rasmus Lindh are leading the LMP2 Drivers' Championship with 662 points, 3 points ahead of George Kurtz, Alex Quinn and Toby Sowery in second. Nicky Catsburg and Tommy Milner are currently on top in the GTD Pro Drivers' Championship with 1243 points, 18 ahead of Connor De Phillippi and Neil Verhagen in second. Christopher Mies and Frédéric Vervisch sits a further 20 points behind in third place. The GTD Drivers' Championship is topped by Eduardo Barrichello with 1280 points, 140 ahead of second-placed Robby Foley and Patrick Gallagher. Cadillac is leading the GTP Manufacturers' Championships. Chevrolet is leading the GTP Pro Manufacturers' Championship and Ferrari is leading the GTD Manufacturers' Championship. Cadillac Whelen, United Autosports USA, Corvette Racing by Pratt Miller Motorsports, and Heart of Racing Team are leading their Teams' Championships.

== Race ==
=== Post-race ===
Class winners are in bold and ‡.

Pos	Class	No	Team	Drivers	Chassis	Laps	Time/Retired
Pos	Class	No	Team	Drivers	Engine	Laps	Time/Retired
1	**GTP**	**31**	**(United States) Cadillac Whelen**	**(United Kingdom) Jack Aitken** **(New Zealand) Earl Bamber** **(Denmark) Frederik Vesti**	**Cadillac V-Series.R**	**182**	**6:00:47.095‡**
1	**GTP**	**31**	**(United States) Cadillac Whelen**	**(United Kingdom) Jack Aitken** **(New Zealand) Earl Bamber** **(Denmark) Frederik Vesti**	**Cadillac LMC55R 5.5 L V8**	**182**	**6:00:47.095‡**
2	GTP	93	(United States) Acura Meyer Shank Racing with Curb-Agajanian	(United Kingdom) Nick Yelloly (Netherlands) Renger van der Zande (Japan) Kakunoshin Ohta	Acura ARX-06	182	+11.166
2	GTP	93	(United States) Acura Meyer Shank Racing with Curb-Agajanian	(United Kingdom) Nick Yelloly (Netherlands) Renger van der Zande (Japan) Kakunoshin Ohta	Acura AR24e 2.4 L Turbo V6	182	+11.166
3	GTP	5	(United States) JDC–Miller MotorSports	(Netherlands) Tijmen van der Helm (Germany) Laurin Heinrich (United States) Kaylen Frederick	Porsche 963	182	+13.742
3	GTP	5	(United States) JDC–Miller MotorSports	(Netherlands) Tijmen van der Helm (Germany) Laurin Heinrich (United States) Kaylen Frederick	Porsche 9RD 4.6 L Turbo V8	182	+13.742
4	GTP	24	(Belgium) BMW M Team WRT	(South Africa) Sheldon van der Linde (Belgium) Dries Vanthoor	BMW M Hybrid V8	182	+17.859
4	GTP	24	(Belgium) BMW M Team WRT	(South Africa) Sheldon van der Linde (Belgium) Dries Vanthoor	BMW P66/3 4.0 L Turbo V8	182	+17.859
5	GTP	7	(Germany) Porsche Penske Motorsport	(France) Julien Andlauer (Brazil) Felipe Nasr	Porsche 963	182	+23.263
5	GTP	7	(Germany) Porsche Penske Motorsport	(France) Julien Andlauer (Brazil) Felipe Nasr	Porsche 9RD 4.6 L Turbo V8	182	+23.263
6	GTP	6	(Germany) Porsche Penske Motorsport	(France) Kévin Estre (Belgium) Laurens Vanthoor	Porsche 963	182	+23.970
6	GTP	6	(Germany) Porsche Penske Motorsport	(France) Kévin Estre (Belgium) Laurens Vanthoor	Porsche 9RD 4.6 L Turbo V8	182	+23.970
7	GTP	10	(United States) Cadillac Wayne Taylor Racing	(Portugal) Filipe Albuquerque (United States) Ricky Taylor	Cadillac V-Series.R	182	+43.600
7	GTP	10	(United States) Cadillac Wayne Taylor Racing	(Portugal) Filipe Albuquerque (United States) Ricky Taylor	Cadillac LMC55R 5.5 L V8	182	+43.600
8	GTP	40	(United States) Cadillac Wayne Taylor Racing	(Switzerland) Louis Delétraz (United States) Jordan Taylor	Cadillac V-Series.R	182	+44.462
8	GTP	40	(United States) Cadillac Wayne Taylor Racing	(Switzerland) Louis Delétraz (United States) Jordan Taylor	Cadillac LMC55R 5.5 L V8	182	+44.462
9	GTP	25	(Belgium) BMW M Team WRT	(Austria) Philipp Eng (Germany) Marco Wittmann	BMW M Hybrid V8	182	+1:24.688
9	GTP	25	(Belgium) BMW M Team WRT	(Austria) Philipp Eng (Germany) Marco Wittmann	BMW P66/3 4.0 L Turbo V8	182	+1:24.688
10	**LMP2**	**99**	**(United States) AO Racing**	**(United States) Dane Cameron** **(United Kingdom) Jonny Edgar** **(United States) P.J. Hyett**	**Oreca 07**	**180**	**+2 Laps‡**
10	**LMP2**	**99**	**(United States) AO Racing**	**(United States) Dane Cameron** **(United Kingdom) Jonny Edgar** **(United States) P.J. Hyett**	**Gibson GK428 4.2 L V8**	**180**	**+2 Laps‡**
11	LMP2	04	(United States) CrowdStrike Racing by APR	(United States) George Kurtz (United Kingdom) Alex Quinn (United Kingdom) Toby Sowery	Oreca 07	179	+3 Laps
11	LMP2	04	(United States) CrowdStrike Racing by APR	(United States) George Kurtz (United Kingdom) Alex Quinn (United Kingdom) Toby Sowery	Gibson GK428 4.2 L V8	179	+3 Laps
12	LMP2	18	(United States) Era Motorsport	(United States) Jacob Abel (Austria) Ferdinand Habsburg (United States) Naveen Rao	Oreca 07	179	+3 Laps
12	LMP2	18	(United States) Era Motorsport	(United States) Jacob Abel (Austria) Ferdinand Habsburg (United States) Naveen Rao	Gibson GK428 4.2 L V8	179	+3 Laps
13	LMP2	43	(Poland) Inter Europol Competition	(United States) Jeremy Clarke (France) Tom Dillmann (United States) Bijoy Garg	Oreca 07	179	+3 Laps
13	LMP2	43	(Poland) Inter Europol Competition	(United States) Jeremy Clarke (France) Tom Dillmann (United States) Bijoy Garg	Gibson GK428 4.2 L V8	179	+3 Laps
14	LMP2	22	(United States) United Autosports USA	(United Kingdom) Paul di Resta (United States) Dan Goldburg (Sweden) Rasmus Lindh	Oreca 07	179	+3 Laps
14	LMP2	22	(United States) United Autosports USA	(United Kingdom) Paul di Resta (United States) Dan Goldburg (Sweden) Rasmus Lindh	Gibson GK428 4.2 L V8	179	+3 Laps
15	LMP2	52	(United States) Bryan Herta Autosport with PR1/Mathiasen	(Canada) Misha Goikhberg (Canada) Parker Thompson (United Kingdom) Harry Tincknell	Oreca 07	179	+3 Laps
15	LMP2	52	(United States) Bryan Herta Autosport with PR1/Mathiasen	(Canada) Misha Goikhberg (Canada) Parker Thompson (United Kingdom) Harry Tincknell	Gibson GK428 4.2 L V8	179	+3 Laps
16	LMP2	8	(Canada) Tower Motorsports	(Mexico) Sebastián Álvarez (Canada) John Farano (France) Tristan Vautier	Oreca 07	179	+3 Laps
16	LMP2	8	(Canada) Tower Motorsports	(Mexico) Sebastián Álvarez (Canada) John Farano (France) Tristan Vautier	Gibson GK428 4.2 L V8	179	+3 Laps
17	LMP2	73	(United States) Pratt Miller Motorsports	(Canada) Chris Cumming (Portugal) Manuel Espírito Santo (Brazil) Pietro Fittipaldi	Oreca 07	179	+3 Laps
17	LMP2	73	(United States) Pratt Miller Motorsports	(Canada) Chris Cumming (Portugal) Manuel Espírito Santo (Brazil) Pietro Fittipaldi	Gibson GK428 4.2 L V8	179	+3 Laps
18	LMP2	2	(United States) United Autosports USA	(Canada) Phil Fayer (Denmark) Mikkel Jensen (New Zealand) Hunter McElrea	Oreca 07	179	+3 Laps
18	LMP2	2	(United States) United Autosports USA	(Canada) Phil Fayer (Denmark) Mikkel Jensen (New Zealand) Hunter McElrea	Gibson GK428 4.2 L V8	179	+3 Laps
19	**GTD Pro**	**14**	**(United States) Vasser Sullivan Racing**	**(United Kingdom) Ben Barnicoat** **(United Kingdom) Jack Hawksworth**	**Lexus RC F GT3**	**171**	**+11 Laps‡**
19	**GTD Pro**	**14**	**(United States) Vasser Sullivan Racing**	**(United Kingdom) Ben Barnicoat** **(United Kingdom) Jack Hawksworth**	**Toyota 2UR-GSE 5.4 L V8**	**171**	**+11 Laps‡**
20	GTD Pro	1	(United States) Paul Miller Racing	(United States) Connor De Phillippi (United States) Neil Verhagen	BMW M4 GT3 Evo	171	+11 Laps
20	GTD Pro	1	(United States) Paul Miller Racing	(United States) Connor De Phillippi (United States) Neil Verhagen	BMW P58 3.0 L Turbo I6	171	+11 Laps
21	GTD Pro	64	(United States) Ford Racing	(United Kingdom) Ben Barker (Norway) Dennis Olsen	Ford Mustang GT3 Evo	171	+11 Laps
21	GTD Pro	64	(United States) Ford Racing	(United Kingdom) Ben Barker (Norway) Dennis Olsen	Ford Coyote 5.4 L V8	171	+11 Laps
22	GTD Pro	3	(United States) Corvette Racing by Pratt Miller Motorsports	(Spain) Antonio García (United Kingdom) Alexander Sims	Chevrolet Corvette Z06 GT3.R	171	+11 Laps
22	GTD Pro	3	(United States) Corvette Racing by Pratt Miller Motorsports	(Spain) Antonio García (United Kingdom) Alexander Sims	Chevrolet LT6.R 5.5 L V8	171	+11 Laps
23	GTD Pro	62	(United States) Risi Competizione	(Italy) Davide Rigon (Brazil) Daniel Serra	Ferrari 296 GT3 Evo	171	+11 Laps
23	GTD Pro	62	(United States) Risi Competizione	(Italy) Davide Rigon (Brazil) Daniel Serra	Ferrari F163CE 3.0 L Turbo V6	171	+11 Laps
24	**GTD**	**912**	**(Germany) Manthey 1st Phorm**	**(United States) Ryan Hardwick** **(Italy) Riccardo Pera** **(Austria) Richard Lietz**	**Porsche 911 GT3 R (992.2)**	**171**	**+11 Laps‡**
24	**GTD**	**912**	**(Germany) Manthey 1st Phorm**	**(United States) Ryan Hardwick** **(Italy) Riccardo Pera** **(Austria) Richard Lietz**	**Porsche M97/80 4.2 L Flat-6**	**171**	**+11 Laps‡**
25	GTD	120	(United States) Wright Motorsports	(United States) Adam Adelson (United Kingdom) Callum Ilott (Australia) Tom Sargent	Porsche 911 GT3 R (992.2)	171	+11 Laps
25	GTD	120	(United States) Wright Motorsports	(United States) Adam Adelson (United Kingdom) Callum Ilott (Australia) Tom Sargent	Porsche M97/80 4.2 L Flat-6	171	+11 Laps
26	GTD	068	(United States) Car Blanche	(United States) Trenton Estep (France) Marius Fossard (France) Valentin Hasse-Clot	Aston Martin Vantage AMR GT3 Evo	171	+11 Laps
26	GTD	068	(United States) Car Blanche	(United States) Trenton Estep (France) Marius Fossard (France) Valentin Hasse-Clot	Aston Martin AMR16A 4.0 L Turbo V8	171	+11 Laps
27	GTD	12	(United States) Vasser Sullivan Racing	(Denmark) Benjamin Pedersen (United States) Aaron Telitz (United States) Frankie Montecalvo	Lexus RC F GT3	171	+11 Laps
27	GTD	12	(United States) Vasser Sullivan Racing	(Denmark) Benjamin Pedersen (United States) Aaron Telitz (United States) Frankie Montecalvo	Toyota 2UR-GSE 5.4 L V8	171	+11 Laps
28	GTD	27	(United States) Heart of Racing Team	(Brazil) Eduardo Barrichello (United Kingdom) Tom Gamble (Canada) Zacharie Robichon	Aston Martin Vantage AMR GT3 Evo	171	+11 Laps
28	GTD	27	(United States) Heart of Racing Team	(Brazil) Eduardo Barrichello (United Kingdom) Tom Gamble (Canada) Zacharie Robichon	Aston Martin AMR16A 4.0 L Turbo V8	171	+11 Laps
29	GTD	34	(United States) Conquest Racing	(Spain) Albert Costa (Italy) Lorenzo Patrese (Spain) Fran Rueda	Ferrari 296 GT3 Evo	171	+11 Laps
29	GTD	34	(United States) Conquest Racing	(Spain) Albert Costa (Italy) Lorenzo Patrese (Spain) Fran Rueda	Ferrari F163CE 3.0 L Turbo V6	171	+11 Laps
30	GTD	96	(United States) Turner Motorsport	(United States) Robby Foley (United States) Patrick Gallagher (United States) Francis Selldorff	BMW M4 GT3 Evo	171	+11 Laps
30	GTD	96	(United States) Turner Motorsport	(United States) Robby Foley (United States) Patrick Gallagher (United States) Francis Selldorff	BMW P58 3.0 L Turbo I6	171	+11 Laps
31	GTD	023	(United States) Triarsi Competizione	(United States) Kenton Koch (United States) Robert Megennis (United States) Onofrio Triarsi	Ferrari 296 GT3 Evo	171	+11 Laps
31	GTD	023	(United States) Triarsi Competizione	(United States) Kenton Koch (United States) Robert Megennis (United States) Onofrio Triarsi	Ferrari F163CE 3.0 L Turbo V6	171	+11 Laps
32	GTD Pro	033	(United States) Triarsi Competizione	(Italy) Riccardo Agostini (United Kingdom) James Calado	Ferrari 296 GT3 Evo	171	+11 Laps
32	GTD Pro	033	(United States) Triarsi Competizione	(Italy) Riccardo Agostini (United Kingdom) James Calado	Ferrari F163CE 3.0 L Turbo V6	171	+11 Laps
33	GTD Pro	77	(United States) AO Racing	(United Kingdom) Harry King (United Kingdom) Nick Tandy	Porsche 911 GT3 R (992.2)	171	+11 Laps
33	GTD Pro	77	(United States) AO Racing	(United Kingdom) Harry King (United Kingdom) Nick Tandy	Porsche M97/80 4.2 L Flat-6	171	+11 Laps
34	GTD Pro	4	(United States) Corvette Racing by Pratt Miller Motorsports	(Netherlands) Nicky Catsburg (United States) Tommy Milner	Chevrolet Corvette Z06 GT3.R	171	+11 Laps
34	GTD Pro	4	(United States) Corvette Racing by Pratt Miller Motorsports	(Netherlands) Nicky Catsburg (United States) Tommy Milner	Chevrolet LT6.R 5.5 L V8	171	+11 Laps
35	GTD	28	(United States) RS1	(Belgium) Jan Heylen (United States) Dillon Machavern (United States) Eric Lux	Porsche 911 GT3 R (992.2)	171	+11 Laps
35	GTD	28	(United States) RS1	(Belgium) Jan Heylen (United States) Dillon Machavern (United States) Eric Lux	Porsche M97/80 4.2 L Flat-6	171	+11 Laps
36	GTD	80	(United States) Lone Star Racing	(Australia) Scott Andrews (Netherlands) Lin Hodenius (Republic of Ireland) James Roe	Mercedes-AMG GT3 Evo	171	+11 Laps
36	GTD	80	(United States) Lone Star Racing	(Australia) Scott Andrews (Netherlands) Lin Hodenius (Republic of Ireland) James Roe	Mercedes-AMG M159 6.2 L V8	171	+11 Laps
37	GTD Pro	9	(Canada) Pfaff Motorsports	(Italy) Andrea Caldarelli (United Kingdom) Sandy Mitchell	Lamborghini Temerario GT3	170	+12 Laps
37	GTD Pro	9	(Canada) Pfaff Motorsports	(Italy) Andrea Caldarelli (United Kingdom) Sandy Mitchell	Lamborghini L411 4.0 L Turbo V8	170	+12 Laps
38	GTD	36	(United States) DXDT Racing	(United States) Mason Filippi (Republic of Ireland) Charlie Eastwood (Turkey) Salih Yoluç	Chevrolet Corvette Z06 GT3.R	170	+12 Laps
38	GTD	36	(United States) DXDT Racing	(United States) Mason Filippi (Republic of Ireland) Charlie Eastwood (Turkey) Salih Yoluç	Chevrolet LT6.R 5.5 L V8	170	+12 Laps
39	GTD	66	(United States) Gradient Racing	(United States) Jake Walker (United States) Corey Lewis (United Kingdom) Till Bechtolsheimer	Ford Mustang GT3 Evo	170	+12 Laps
39	GTD	66	(United States) Gradient Racing	(United States) Jake Walker (United States) Corey Lewis (United Kingdom) Till Bechtolsheimer	Ford Coyote 5.4 L V8	170	+12 Laps
40	GTD	13	(Canada) 13 Autosport	(United Kingdom) Matt Bell (Canada) Orey Fidani (Germany) Lars Kern	Chevrolet Corvette Z06 GT3.R	170	+12 Laps
40	GTD	13	(Canada) 13 Autosport	(United Kingdom) Matt Bell (Canada) Orey Fidani (Germany) Lars Kern	Chevrolet LT6.R 5.5 L V8	170	+12 Laps
41	GTD Pro	65	(United States) Ford Racing	(Germany) Christopher Mies (Belgium) Frédéric Vervisch	Ford Mustang GT3 Evo	169	Crash
41	GTD Pro	65	(United States) Ford Racing	(Germany) Christopher Mies (Belgium) Frédéric Vervisch	Ford Coyote 5.4 L V8	169	Crash
42	GTD	16	(United States) Myers Riley Motorsports	(Brazil) Felipe Fraga (United States) Sheena Monk (United States) Jenson Altzman	Ford Mustang GT3 Evo	161	+21 Laps
42	GTD	16	(United States) Myers Riley Motorsports	(Brazil) Felipe Fraga (United States) Sheena Monk (United States) Jenson Altzman	Ford Coyote 5.4 L V8	161	+21 Laps
43	GTD	57	(United States) Winward Racing	(Switzerland) Philip Ellis (United States) Russell Ward (Netherlands) Indy Dontje	Mercedes-AMG GT3 Evo	145	+37 Laps
43	GTD	57	(United States) Winward Racing	(Switzerland) Philip Ellis (United States) Russell Ward (Netherlands) Indy Dontje	Mercedes-AMG M159 6.2 L V8	145	+37 Laps
44	GTD Pro	59	(United States) RLL Team McLaren	(United States) Max Esterson (United States) Nikita Johnson	McLaren 720S GT3 Evo	140	
44	GTD Pro	59	(United States) RLL Team McLaren	(United States) Max Esterson (United States) Nikita Johnson	McLaren M840T 4.0 L Turbo V8	140	
45	GTD	81	(United States) DragonSpeed	(Italy) Giacomo Altoè (Sweden) Henrik Hedman (United Kingdom) Casper Stevenson	Chevrolet Corvette Z06 GT3.R	137	+45 Laps
45	GTD	81	(United States) DragonSpeed	(Italy) Giacomo Altoè (Sweden) Henrik Hedman (United Kingdom) Casper Stevenson	Chevrolet LT6.R 5.5 L V8	137	+45 Laps
46	GTD	21	(Italy) AF Corse USA	(Italy) Antonio Fuoco (United States) Simon Mann (United States) Alec Udell	Ferrari 296 GT3 Evo	122	Crash
46	GTD	21	(Italy) AF Corse USA	(Italy) Antonio Fuoco (United States) Simon Mann (United States) Alec Udell	Ferrari F163CE 3.0 L Turbo V6	122	Crash
47	GTD	70	(United Kingdom) Inception Racing	(United States) Brendan Iribe (United Kingdom) Ollie Millroy (New Zealand) Jaxon Evans	Ferrari 296 GT3 Evo	94	Crash
47	GTD	70	(United Kingdom) Inception Racing	(United States) Brendan Iribe (United Kingdom) Ollie Millroy (New Zealand) Jaxon Evans	Ferrari F163CE 3.0 L Turbo V6	94	Crash
48	GTD	44	(United States) Magnus Racing	(United States) John Potter (United States) Spencer Pumpelly (Germany) Mario Farnbacher	Aston Martin Vantage AMR GT3 Evo	94	Crash
48	GTD	44	(United States) Magnus Racing	(United States) John Potter (United States) Spencer Pumpelly (Germany) Mario Farnbacher	Aston Martin AMR16A 4.0 L Turbo V8	94	Crash
49	LMP2	11	(France) TDS Racing	(Denmark) David Heinemeier Hansson (Canada) Tobias Lütke (Switzerland) Mathias Beche	Oreca 07	91	Crash
49	LMP2	11	(France) TDS Racing	(Denmark) David Heinemeier Hansson (Canada) Tobias Lütke (Switzerland) Mathias Beche	Gibson GK428 4.2 L V8	91	Crash
50	GTD Pro	911	(Germany) Manthey Racing	(Austria) Klaus Bachler (Denmark) Michael Christensen (Netherlands) Loek Hartog	Porsche 911 GT3 R (992.2)	55	Crash
50	GTD Pro	911	(Germany) Manthey Racing	(Austria) Klaus Bachler (Denmark) Michael Christensen (Netherlands) Loek Hartog	Porsche M97/80 4.2 L Flat-6	55	Crash
51	GTD	45	(United States) Wayne Taylor Racing	(Costa Rica) Danny Formal (United States) Trent Hindman (United States) Graham Doyle	Lamborghini Huracán GT3 Evo 2	46	Mechanical
51	GTD	45	(United States) Wayne Taylor Racing	(Costa Rica) Danny Formal (United States) Trent Hindman (United States) Graham Doyle	Lamborghini DGF 5.2 L V10	46	Mechanical
52	LMP2	37	(United States) Intersport Racing	(United States) Jon Field (United Kingdom) Oliver Jarvis (United States) Seth Lucas	Oreca 07	31	Crash
52	LMP2	37	(United States) Intersport Racing	(United States) Jon Field (United Kingdom) Oliver Jarvis (United States) Seth Lucas	Gibson GK428 4.2 L V8	31	Crash
53	GTP	60	(United States) Acura Meyer Shank Racing with Curb-Agajanian	(United Kingdom) Tom Blomqvist (United States) Colin Braun	Acura ARX-06	21	Crash
53	GTP	60	(United States) Acura Meyer Shank Racing with Curb-Agajanian	(United Kingdom) Tom Blomqvist (United States) Colin Braun	Acura AR24e 2.4 L Turbo V6	21	Crash
54	GTP	23	(United States) Aston Martin THOR Team	(Canada) Roman De Angelis (United Kingdom) Ross Gunn	Aston Martin Valkyrie	21	Crash
54	GTP	23	(United States) Aston Martin THOR Team	(Canada) Roman De Angelis (United Kingdom) Ross Gunn	Aston Martin RA 6.5 L V12	21	Crash

IMSA SportsCar Championship
Previous race: Chevrolet Detroit Sports Car Classic	2026 season	Next race: Chevrolet Grand Prix
