= 2020 24 Hours of Daytona =

58th annual 24 Hours of Daytona endurance race

Previous: 2019	Next: 2021
Index: Races | Winners

Map of the Daytona International Speedway combined road course

The 2020 24 Hours of Daytona (formally the 2020 Rolex 24 at Daytona) was an endurance sports car race sanctioned by the International Motor Sports Association (IMSA). The event was held at the Daytona International Speedway combined road course in Daytona Beach, Florida, on January 25–26, 2020. This event was the 58th running of the 24 Hours of Daytona, and the first of 12 races across multiple classes in the 2020 WeatherTech SportsCar Championship, as well as the first of four rounds in the 2020 Michelin Endurance Cup.

== Background ==
=== Preview ===
Daytona International Speedway in 2015

NASCAR founder Bill France Sr., who built the Daytona International Speedway in 1959, conceived the 24 Hours of Daytona as a race to attract European sports car endurance racing to the United States and provide international exposure to Daytona. It is informally considered part of the "Triple Crown of Endurance Racing" with the 12 Hours of Sebring and the 24 Hours of Le Mans.

Then International Motor Sports Association's (IMSA) president Scott Atherton confirmed the race was part of the schedule for the 2020 IMSA SportsCar Championship (IMSA SCC) in August 2019. It was the seventh consecutive year it was part of the IMSA SCC, and the 58th 24 Hours of Daytona. The 24 Hours of Daytona was the first of eleven sports car endurance races of 2020 by IMSA, and the first of four races of the Michelin Endurance Cup MEC). It took place at the 12-turn 3.56 mi (5.73 km) Daytona International Speedway combined road course in Daytona Beach, Florida, from January 25 to 26.

=== Regulation changes ===
Prior to the start of the 2020 WeatherTech SportsCar Championship, a series of regulation changes were made, including changes to driver eligibility for the secondary prototype class in the series, the Le Mans Prototype class (LMP2). The rule change stated that each LMP2 team is only allowed to enter one Platinum-rated driver across the entire season, and it must be for the opening round at Daytona, due to the 24-hour-length of this round. A requirement for a Bronze-rated driver for the full season was also passed for the LMP2 class, in addition to the removal of the 24 Hours of Daytona as a points-scoring event for the class, instead only being a round for Michelin Endurance Cup Points.

=== Change of leadership ===
Four months prior to the event, on September 19, 2019, Scott Atherton announced retirement from his position as the President of the International Motor Sports Association at the end of 2019. He had held that role since the merger of IMSA's American Le Mans Series with the Grand-Am Rolex Sports Car Series in 2014. One month following that announcement, then-director of Mazda's motorsports program in North America, John Doonan, was confirmed to be Atherton's replacement.

=== Balance of Performance ===
On December 20, 2019, IMSA published a technical bulletin regarding the Balance of Performance (BoP) constraints for the 24 hour event, as well as announcing a revised process for adjusting said constraints from race to race. The constraints were exclusive to the 24 Hours of Daytona and its test session, the Roar Before The 24. In the Daytona Prototype International (DPi) class, the Cadillac DPi-V.R was made 20 kilograms heavier, bringing the car's weight to 950 kilograms. The Cadillac was also given 3.0 liter increase in fuel capacity. The Mazda RT24-P was given a five kilogram weight increase, bringing the total weight to 910 kilograms, 40 kilograms lighter than the Cadillac. By comparison, the Acura ARX-05 merely saw a 2.0 liter increase in fuel capacity.

== Roar Before the 24 ==
=== First day ===
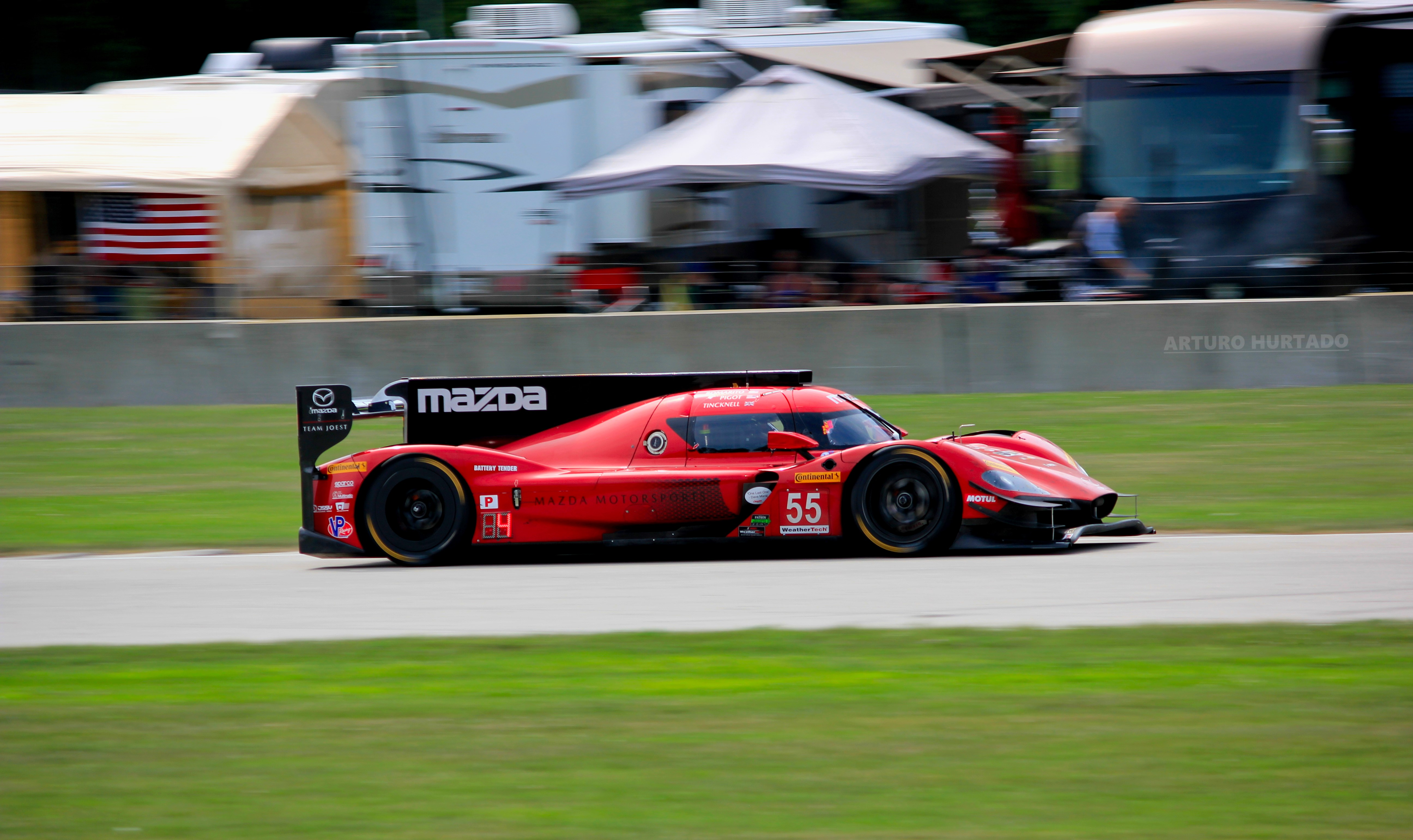
The Mazda RT24-P (pictured at Road America in 2018) set the fastest lap times on the first day of the Roar.

Mazda Team Joest set the fastest time in the second of the two qualifying sessions in the #77 RT-24P, with a 1:35.794, set by Olivier Pla, as the #77 went on to top the time sheets, having the fastest time of all the entries. The #77 was followed up by the #55, setting a time of 1:35.874, also in the second session, set by Oliver Jarvis. In the LMP2 class, the fastest laptime was a 1:38.315, set by the #52 PR1 Mathiasen Motorsports Oreca 07.

The #25 Team RLL BMW M8 GTE set the fastest time of a 1:44.239. The highlight of the GTLM class was the Corvette Racing C8.R, which made its first competitive appearance. Sporting two cars, #4 and #5, the #4 set the best time of 1:45.009, placing sixth and seventh in the GTLM field. The AIM Vasser Sullivan Lexus RC F GT3 set the fastest time of the 1:47.031, with the Grasser Racing Team's #11 Lamborghini Huracán Evo GT3, setting a 1:47.353, followed by the second of the AIM Lexus GT3 cars, third in the GTD class.

=== Second day ===
The DPi class-leading Mazda Team Joest car from day 1 decreased on their times drastically, to the point that Olivier Pla, who had the fastest time during the first day, set an unofficial time of a 1:33.324, beating the outright track record set by Oliver Jarvis in the 2018 24 Hours of Daytona. Second fastest was the #7 Team Penske ARX-05, setting a 1:33.543. The #6 ARX-05 followed closely behind with a 1:33.565. The #77 Mazda DPi set a 1:33.660 in fifth place. The field was rounded out by the JDC-Miller MotorSports Cadillacs in sixth and seventh and the Wayne Taylor Cadillac last in the DPi field.

The LMP2 class was dominated by the #52 PR1 Mathiasen Motorsports Oreca 07 once again with a 1:38.056. Second was the #81 Dragonspeed Orcea 07, followed by the #8 team of Tower Motorsport by Starworks.

All seven GTLM's were separated by 0.446 seconds. Risi Competizione's James Calado set a best time in the GTLM field of a 1:42.685 in the Ferrari 488 GTE, edging out Nick Tandy by a thousandth in the Porsche GT Team 911 RSR 19, which is also making a first time appearance, in a revised trim of the 911 RSR. The #4 Corvette C8.R was the third fastest in the GTLM category with a 1:42.793. The #24 Team RLL M8 GTE placed forth and the #912 Porsche placed fifth.

The #12 AIM Vasser Sullivan Lexus RC F GT3 set the best time in GTD with a 1:46.754, followed by the #86 Meyer Shank Racing Acura NSX GT3 at a 1:46.873. The #96 Turner Motorsport BMW M6 GT3 posted a 1:46.919.

== Practice ==
The first practice took place on the morning of Wednesday, January 22, 2020. The track was damp, therefore times would not be at their quickest. Juan Pablo Montoya in the Team Penske #6 Acura ARX-05c was able to lead the first practice with a time of a 1:49.719, completing only six laps. Olivier Pla in the #77 Mazda RT-24P placed second close behind the Acura setting a 1:49.956 on the car's final practice lap. In total, both Mazda cars completed 36 laps. The fastest Cadillac DPi-V.R. was the #85 JDC-Miller MotorSports with a 1:50.316. In LMP2, David Heinemeier Hansson was the fastest driver in the category setting a 1:52.193 in the #8 Tower Motorsports Oreca 07. The #81 DragonSpeed Oreca 07 was second in LMP2 with a time of 1:53.555 set by Henrik Hedman.

The GTLM category was led by Porsche, with both 911 RSR 19's finishing first and second. The fastest of the factory RSR-19's was driven by Laurens Vanthoor in the #912, who set a 1:57.001. The #3 Corvette Racing C8.R fastest time was 1:57.991, which was fast enough for third place. In GTD, #88 WRT Speedstar Audi Sport R8 LMS driven by Mirko Bortolotti set a 1:58.763 to lead the class. The #9 Pfaff Motorsport Porsche was within a hundredth of a second of the leading R8 LMS. Shane van Gisbergen placed the #12 Lexus RC F GT3 in third place in the class.

The second free practice was a drier one, led by #7 Acura ARX-05c. Ricky Taylor set the fastest time with a 1:34.904. Oliver Jarvis placed the #77 RT-24P in second place with a 1:35.119. The #81 DragonSpeed Oreca 07, driven by Ben Hanley, finished first in the LMP2 class, with a 1:37.418. Nicolas Lapierre put the #8 Tower Motorsports Oreca 07 in second place, setting a lap time of 1:38.371. Gabriel Aubry would put the Oreca 07 of #52 PR1/Mathiasen Motorsports in third place.

Though not fastest initially, the #912 Porsche 911 RSR 19 was able to best the Corvette Racing C8.R's who started the second practice fastest in the GTLM field by the end of the session. The #912's time was a 1:42.508, which was under three tenths of the record in GTLM set by Nick Tandy in the previous generation 911 RSR. Turner Motorsport finished on top of the GTD class, followed by the Pfaff Motorsport Porsche. The top two were followed by Lamborghinis, with the GRT Grasser Car in third and the #48 Paul Miller Racing car in fourth place.

In Free Practice 3, Filipe Albuquerque was able to set the fastest time in the DPi class for the #31 Action Express Cadillac time, setting a 1:34.914. Another Cadillac followed behind him, with Renger Van Der Zande setting a 1:35.246 for the #10 Wayne Taylor Racing team. The #5 JDC-Mustang Sampling Racing Cadillac rounded out the top three cars in the DPi class, with Joao Barbosa clocking a 1:35.478 time. Neither of the two Mazdas, the #55 and #77, could partake in the third practice session and instead were in the garage. In the LMP2 class, the #52 PR1/Mathiasen Motorsports entry was the fastest, with Gabriel Aubry setting a time of 1:37.084. Colin Braun in the #81 DragonSpeed Oreca 07 was second and Ryan Dalziel in the #8 Tower Motorsports Oreca 07 rounded out the top three in LMP2.

The #912 Porsche 911 RSR-19 continued to top the GTLM class, with Mathieu Jaminet clocking a 1:43.301. Augusto Farfus in the #24 BMW M8 GTE was able to post a 1:43.611, good enough for second in the 48 laps it ran in total. The sister #25 BMW was in the garage to fix a broken fuel pump, and only managed to complete 11 laps. Frederic Makowiecki was able to place the second of the Porsches, the #911 in third, setting a 1:43.863. In GTD, the #16 Wright Motorsport Porsche 911 GT3 R topped the class with Klaus Bachler posting a 1:46.128. The #9 Pfaff Motorsports Porsche entry was behind in second, with Dennis Olsen setting a 1:46.203. Towards the end of their practice session, the #9 team lost its power en route to the pit box. The #48 Paul Miller Racing Lamborghini Huracan GT3 Evo rounded out the top three in GTD, with Andrea Caldarelli posting a 1:46.216.

Cadillac's success from last practice carried over to the next day for the final practice of the Rolex 24, on Friday before the race. The #10 Wayne Taylor Racing Cadillac led at the end of the final practice, improving its position from second in the previous practice session. Their fastest driver was the endurance veteran Kamui Kobayashi, his best lap being a 1:35.340. Second in the DPi class was Helio Castroneves in the #7 Team Penske Acura, which recovered well, sustaining its speed from its earlier sessions despite crashing in qualifying the previous day. Castroneves' time was 1:35.733, 0.393 seconds off the pace of Kobayashi's time. Sébastien Bourdais drove the #5 JDC-Mustang Sampling Cadillac to third overall, with a time of 1:36.031. In LMP2, the #8 Tower Motorsports Oreca 07 was the fastest, with Nicolas Lapierre setting a 1:37.230 to lead the class. The PR1/Mathiasen Motorsports Oreca 07 was second quickest, with Gabriel Aubry posting a 1:37.249. The #38 Performance Tech Motorsports Oreca 07 cause a red flag that would end the session, as it crashed into the tire barrier at turn six, with the car's underbody leaned on top of the barrier.

Corvette Racing's Antonio Garcia would set the fastest time of all the GTLM cars in the #3 C8.R, with a time of 1:42.962, overtaking the dominant #912 Porsche later in the session. The #912, driven fastest by Earl Bamber, was 0.6 seconds off the pace of Antonio García. The #911 Porsche, driven fastest by Nick Tandy, would place in third. In GTD, only three cars participated in the final practice, with the #11 GRT Grasser Racing Team Lamborghini setting a best class time of 1:46.308, driven by Franck Perera. The #63 Scuderia Corsa's fastest driver was Toni Vilander, setting a 1:46.430. The Black Swan Racing, after heavy damage from a previous crash, would also take to the track with a new car donated from Wright Motorsports. Black Swan's fastest driver, Jeroen Bleekemoelen, set a lap time of 1:46.467.

== Qualifying ==
Oliver Jarvis placed the #77 Mazda RT-24P on the pole position for the 58th 24 Hours of Daytona, with a time of 1:33.711, besting the rest of the field by four tenths, but failing to beat the track record he set last year by .026 thousandths. Juan Pablo Montoya placed the #6 Team Penske Acura ARX-05c second overall with a time of 1:34.154. The sister #7 Team Penske Acura driven by Ricky Taylor would cause a red flag at the bus stop chicane which would shorten the session slightly. Rounding out the top three was the #55 Mazda driven by Jonathan Bomarito with a close 1:34.169. Securing a pole position in the LMP2 class was the #52 PR1/ Mathiasen Motorsports Oreca 07 with a time of 1:37.446, driven fastest by Ben Keating. Henrik Hedman set a time of 1:37.728 for the #81 DragonSpeed Oreca 07, and the #8 Tower Motorsports Oreca 07 placed third on the starting grid, with John Farano having a best time in the car of a 1:39.279.

The GTLM category's qualifying was another session in which Porsche asserted its dominance. The #911 Porsche 911 RSR 19 besting its sister #912, driven by Nick Tandy to first place in class as well as beating the GTLM lap record at Daytona set by himself. Nick Tandy's time was a 1:42.207. The #912 911 RSR 19 settled for second place with a 1:42.256, after taking the lead in the GTLM class earlier, driven fastest by Laurens Vanthoor. Corvette Racing would take the challenge to Porsche, trading times for positions early. The #3 C8.R would get within three tenths of the Porsches with a 1:42.545 by Antonio Garcia, but could not catch up to the Porsches. The #3 placed third. The #4 Corvette Racing C8.R would place fourth, its fastest driver being Tommy Milner. Phillip Eng would set a time for the #25 BMW Team RLL M8 GTE for fifth best in class at 1:42.941, with the sister car #24 M8 GTE setting a time in the low 1:43's. 1.4 seconds off the lead was Alessandro Pier Guidi in the Risi Competizione Ferrari 488 GTE, which starts at the back of the GTLM grid. Pfaff Motorsports will lead the GTD field to the green flag, as Zacharie Robichon posted a 1:45.237, which also happened to be a new record at Daytona in the GTD category. Next the leading Porsche 911 GT3 R will be the #63 Scuderia Corsa Ferrari 488 GT3 Evo, as Jeff Westphal drove the car the fastest to a time of 1:45.713. The #57 Heindricher Racing with MSR Curb-Agajanian Acura NSX GT3 Evo placed third with a 1:45.837 by Trent Hindman. Fourth through sixth in the GTD class was closely contested. However, at the end of the session, the #96 Turner Motorsport BMW M6 GT3 driven by Robbie Foley set a 1:45.872. The #96 BMW M6 GT3 was followed by the #11 GRT Grasser Racing Team Lamborghini Huracan GT3 Evo and #88 WRT Speedstar Audi R8 LMS, who were fifth and sixth respectfully. The #14 AIM Vasser Sullivan Lexus RC F GT3 sat out with an engine change. The #23 Heart of Racing Aston Martin Vantage GT3's penalty was changed, with the five minute penalty applying to the next practice session rather than qualifying. Both Aston Martins are placed eleventh and twelfth in the GTD grid.

=== Qualifying results ===
Pole positions in each class are indicated in bold and with ‡.

Pos.	Class	No.	Entry	Driver	Time	Gap	Grid
1	**DPi**	**77**	**(Germany) Mazda Team Joest**	**(United Kingdom) Oliver Jarvis**	**1:33.711**	—	1‡
2	DPi	6	(United States) Acura Team Penske	(Colombia) Juan Pablo Montoya	1:34.154	+0.443	2
3	DPi	55	(Germany) Mazda Team Joest	(United States) Jonathan Bomarito	1:34.169	+0.458	3
4	DPi	31	(United States) Whelen Engineering Racing	(Brazil) Felipe Nasr	1:34.294	+0.583	4
5	DPi	10	(United States) Konica Minolta Cadillac	(Australia) Ryan Briscoe	1:34.442	+0.731	5
6	DPi	85	(United States) JDC-Miller MotorSports	(France) Tristan Vautier	1:34.454	+0.743	6
7	DPi	5	(United States) JDC-Mustang Sampling Racing	(Portugal) João Barbosa	1:35.047	+1.336	7
8	**LMP2**	**52**	**(United States) PR1/Mathiasen Motorsports**	**(United States) Ben Keating**	**1:37.446**	**+3.735**	9‡
9	LMP2	81	(United States) DragonSpeed USA	(Sweden) Henrik Hedman	1:37.728	+4.017	10
10	LMP2	8	(United States) Tower Motorsports by Starworks	(Canada) John Farano	1:39.275	+5.564	11
11	LMP2	38	(United States) Performance Tech Motorsports	(Canada) Cameron Cassels	1:39.397	+5.686	12
12	**GTLM**	**911**	**(United States) Porsche GT Team**	**(United Kingdom) Nick Tandy**	**1:42.207**	**+8.496**	14‡
13	GTLM	912	(United States) Porsche GT Team	(Belgium) Laurens Vanthoor	1:42.256	+8.545	15
14	LMP2	18	(United States) Era Motorsports	(United States) Dwight Merriman	1:42.262	+8.551	13
15	GTLM	3	(United States) Corvette Racing	(Spain) Antonio García	1:42.545	+8.834	16
16	GTLM	4	(United States) Corvette Racing	(United States) Tommy Milner	1:42.801	+9.090	17
17	GTLM	25	(United States) BMW Team RLL	(Austria) Philipp Eng	1:42.941	+9.230	18
18	GTLM	24	(United States) BMW Team RLL	(United States) John Edwards	1:43.089	+9.378	19
19	GTLM	62	(United States) Risi Competizione	(Italy) Alessandro Pier Guidi	1:43.668	+9.957	20
20	DPi	7	(United States) Acura Team Penske	(United States) Ricky Taylor	1:44.065^{1}	+10.354	8
21	**GTD**	**9**	**(Canada) Pfaff Motorsports**	**(Canada) Zacharie Robichon**	**1:45.237**	**+11.526**	21‡
22	GTD	63	(United States) Scuderia Corsa	(United States) Jeff Westphal	1:45.713	+12.002	22
23	GTD	57	(United States) Heinricher Racing with MSR Curb-Agajanian	(United States) Trent Hindman	1:45.837	+12.126	23
24	GTD	96	(United States) Turner Motorsport	(United States) Robby Foley	1:45.872	+12.161	24
25	GTD	11	(Austria) GRT Grasser Racing Team	(Netherlands) Steijn Schothorst	1:46.050	+12.329	25
26	GTD	88	(Canada) WRT Speedstar Audi Sport	(Switzerland) Rolf Ineichen	1:46.175	+12.464	26
27	GTD	12	(Canada) AIM Vasser Sullivan	(United States) Frankie Montecalvo	1:46.185	+12.474	27
28	GTD	48	(United States) Paul Miller Racing	(United States) Madison Snow	1:46.191	+12.480	28
29	GTD	86	(United States) Meyer Shank Racing with Curb-Agajanian	(Germany) Mario Farnbacher	1:46.478	+12.767	29
30	GTD	16	(United States) Wright Motorsports	(United States) Ryan Hardwick	1:46.485	+12.774	30
31	GTD	47	(United States) Precision Performance Motorsports	(United States) Brandon Gdovic	1:46.835	+13.124	31
32	GTD	98	(United Kingdom) Aston Martin Racing	(Austria) Mathias Lauda	1:46.880	+13.169	32
33	GTD	23	(United States) Heart of Racing Team	(United Kingdom) Ian James	1:47.041	+13.330	33
34	GTD	19	(Austria) GEAR Racing Powered by GRT Grasser	(Denmark) Christina Nielsen	1:47.148	+13.437	34
35	GTD	74	(United States) Riley Motorsports	(United States) Gar Robinson	1:47.273	+13.562	35
36	GTD	14	(Canada) AIM Vasser Sullivan	Did Not Participate			36
37	GTD	44	(United States) GRT Magnus	No Time Established			37
38	GTD	54	(United States) Black Swan Racing	Did Not Participate			38
Sources:

- ^{1} The No. 7 Acura Team Penske entry had its two fastest laps deleted as penalty for causing a red flag during its qualifying session.

== Race ==
=== Report ===
First Hour

The 58th running of the 24 Hours of Daytona got underway in clear conditions, with the #77 Team Joest Mazda RT-24P leading the field of thirty-eight strong to the green flag. Early on the first lap, Oliver Jarvis, opening driver for the #77 car, stretched out his lead to 1.5 seconds over the #7 Team Penske Acura ARX-05c and the #31 Whelen Engineering Cadillac DPi-V.R. In GTLM, Nick Tandy lead the field in the #911 Porsche 911 RSR-19, with the #3 Corvette Racing C8.R in hot pursuit. The #52 PR1/Mathiasen Motorsports entry being driven by Ben Keating stretched his lead out to seven seconds over the rest of the LMP2 class. Back in the overall battle, Felipe Nasr, of the #31 Whelen Engineering Racing Cadillac team, would pass the #6 Acura of Juan Pablo Montoya for second position twenty minutes into the race. Ten minutes later, the #55 Team Joest Mazda was the first DPi car to pit, and eventually the rest of the DPi's would follow. At the same time, the battle for the lead in GTLM was closely contested between the #3 Corvette C8.R and the #912 and #911 Porsche cars, which sat in first and third at the time, respectively. The BMW M8 GTE's of Team RLL were in fourth and fifth, trailing the #911 Porsche by twelve seconds. The GTLM's would begin their first pit stop cycle 52 minutes in, with no position changes after the stop sequence ended.

Hour 2

Four minutes into the second hour, Felipe Nasr in the #31 Cadillac was attempting to take the overall lead from the #77 Mazda of Oliver Jarvis. Soon enough, the second cycle of pit stops would start with the duo of Mazda prototypes, about forty minutes into both their stints. Just under thirty minutes into the second hour, the Corvette #3 now found itself in fourth place, dropping behind both the #912 Porsche and #25 BMW. However, trouble would be in store in the pits for the #25, with a slow stop that came from a problem with the removal of the left front wheel, costing them an extra minute in the pits. The #31 Cadillac would also have an unscheduled pit stop, using the stop to unclog the top roof intake. Their issue placed the #77 Mazda thirty seconds clear of the #6 Acura.

Hour 3

The pole sitting and leading #9 Pfaff Motorsport Porsche 911 GT3 R driven by Dennis Olsen, and the #96 Turner Motorsport BMW M6 GT3 driven by Bill Auberlen, contested for the GTD lead at the start of the third hour. The third place runner in GTD was Bryan Sellers in the #48 Paul Miller Racing Lamborghini, seventeen seconds off the lead battle. Twenty minutes later, in the overall battle, the #10 Wayne Taylor Racing Cadillac's lengthy stints were taking their toll on the lead #77 Mazda. Forty-five minutes into the hour, the #10 Cadillac with WEC regular Kamui Kobayashi at the wheel was able to get on the inside of turn one to pass the #77 white Mazda of Tristan Nunez. Meanwhile, the #52 PR1/Mathiasen Motorsports Oreca 07 and #9 Pfaff Motorsports Porsche lead the way comfortably in the LMP2 and GTD classes.

Hour 4

Eleven minutes into the fourth hour, the #77 Joest Mazda reclaimed the lead from the #10 Wayne Taylor Racing Cadillac in the bus stop chicane, which struggled on cold tires having recently just come out from the pits. Not much later, the #10 Cadillac received a speeding penalty after Kamui Kobayashi exited out of pit lane above the pit lane speed limit. They would serve a drive-through penalty. A more significant event was the encounter between the #55 Team Joest Mazda of Harry Ticknell and the #7 Team Penske Acura of Helio Castroneves. Ticknell dove underneath Castroneves at the entry of the bus stop chicane and the #7 Acura got into the #55 Mazda, sending the Castroneves around and into the tire barrier. The aftermath of the crash sent the damaged #7 Acura to the garage and potentially out of the race contention. Ticknell received a drive through penalty, knocking the #55 off the lead lap. A little after thirty minutes in the hour, the #24 BMW M8 GTE being driven by Chaz Mostert was able to pass the #912 Porsche in second place in GTLM, splitting the bond that the Porsches had since the first hour. The position change placed the #25 BMW three seconds behind the leading #911 Porsche. With nine minutes to go in the hour, the #6 Acura of Dane Cameron was able to pass the #77 Mazda of Olivier Pla for overall lead.

Hour 5

Helio Castroneves re-joined the track after a thirty-seven minute repair. The car was twenty four laps off the lead. The second place LMP2, the #81 DragonSpeed Oreca 07 suffered a blown right rear tire ten minutes into the hour. It will lose time to the leading #52 Oreca, still leading the class. Entering the night, the #24 Team RLL BMW in the hands of Jesse Krohn gained the lead after the GTLM pit stops cycled through over both the Porsche GT Team cars. The #6 Acura still kept the overall lead after the DPi pit cycle, despite having the worst fuel position amongst the DPi's. However, the #77 Mazda would eventually pass the #6 Acura on pace, and the #10 Cadillac was only twenty seconds behind, as Renger van der Zande recovered time quickly after the penalty. About forty-five minutes into the session, there would be a full course caution. The #23 Aston Martin crashed into the #47 Lamborghini sending both cars into the infield as they were entering pit lane. The #47 did not sustain much damage, but the #23 sustained significant front end damage. After the pits opened under the caution, the running order is the #6 Acura, #31 Cadillac, #77 Mazda, #5 Cadillac, #10 Cadillac (repaired rear light under caution), #85 Cadillac, #55 Mazda, and #7 Acura.

Hour 6

After a short delay caused from the #25 BMW stopping on track, the race get under way. Within two minutes of the race restart, the #77 Mazda retakes the lead, overtaking both the #6 Acura of Simon Pagenaud and the #31 Cadillac. Soon after, the #24 BMW gained the lead to GTLM after passing both Porsches, #911 and #912. Toni Vilander, driving the #63 Scuderia Corsa Ferrari 488 GT3 Evo passed the #48 Paul Miller Racing Lamborghini for the lead in GTD. The #9 Pfaff Motorsport Porsche was behind, third in GTD. With about fifteen minutes to go in the hour, Nicky Catsburg in the #3 Corvette C8.R was in second place. It is also confirmed that the #25 BMW, which stopped on track is now in the garage with a damaged oil line. In the last ten minutes of the hour, Pedro Lamy's #98 Aston Martin V8 Vantage GT3 made contact with the #3 Corvette after spinning under braking at turn one. Both would pit soon after, the #3 Corvette with no repairs, but the #98 clipped the pit exit wall on the way out, causing more damage than the turn one event. Lamy would return to the pits.

Hour 7

The GTLM lead is being contested tightly between the first three cars, the #912 Porsche, #24 BMW, and #911 Porsche, so close that even the #24 and #911 touch, but without any major incident. The #77 Mazda had dropped back to fourth as well in the hands of Oliver Jarvis. Two retirements were confirmed in the race and both were Aston Martins, the #98 and #23 entries forty minutes into the hour. Seven minutes before the hour ended, the #77 has regained some of its lost positioning was a half-second behind second place, being occupied by the #31 Whelen Engineering Cadillac, thanks to a solid stint by Olivier Pla. Five minutes later Pla would pass the #31 Cadillac.

Hour 8

The #912 Porsche 911 RSR-19 driven by Earl Bamber passed the #24 BMW M8 GTE raced by Augusto Farfus in the international horseshoe, with a little under thirty minutes to go in the hour. The #24 BMW would retake the lead in GTLM around the forty minute mark in the hour. Around the same time, the #5 Cadillac being driven by Sebastian Bourdais went down a lap to the overall lead. Two Cadillacs, two Mazdas, and one Acura remain on the lead lap. Three-fourths in the hour, the second full course caution, came out, to rescue the #38 Performance Tech Oreca 07 LMP2 in the International Horseshoe, six laps down off the lead in LMP2. All the DPi's pitted in for fuel except the #77 Mazda and #10 Cadillac. The #55 Mazda was able to change front bodywork after the earlier incident with the Acura DPi and did not lose a lap. The #10 Cadillac pitted before the caution. The #24 BMW and #48 Lamborghini both pitted under the caution and retained their class leads.

Hour 9

Twenty-four minutes into the ninth hour, Ben Hanley in the #81 DragonSpeed passed the #52 PR1/Mathiasen Motorsports entry. They still remained up to that point the only two cars on the lead lap in LMP2. A little while after, the #912 Porsche of Mathieu Jaminet passed the #24 BMW of Augusto Farfus for third in GTLM. When the #3 Corvette and #62 Ferrari pit, they will take the place of first and second.

Hour 10

In the GTD class, the #9 Pfaff Motorsport Porsche has reached the lead once again after floating around in second and third two minutes into the tenth hour. Thirty minutes into the hour, the slower C8.R, the #4 Corvette, would enter the garage with an oil leak. Six minutes before the end of the hour, Ryan Briscoe's #10 Cadillac spun in the infield on his outlap with new tires.

Hour 11

The #19 Lamborghini has caused a full course caution after stopping on the apron of the speedway. The #10 Wayne Taylor Racing and #31 Mustang Sampling Cadillacs pit under the caution to change brakes, They drop to fifth and sixth in class. The #77 Mazda took the lead. At midnight, the race went back to green. However, five minutes into the next day, trouble found the #77 Mazda, as it served a drive through penalty for improper safety car procedures. The #5 Mustang Sampling car took control of the lead, just ahead of the #55 Mazda. The #77 would rejoin the competition in sixth place, thirty-seven seconds back. A little below forty minutes into the hour, the #48 Paul Miller Racing Lamborghini passed the #9 Pfaff Motorsport Porsche for first in GTD.

Hour 12

The seven car field of GTLM has five of its entries within two and a half seconds of each other. The #9 Pfaff Motorsport Porsche, lost track position, and was then tenth in class, with an issue refueling, about twenty minutes into the hour. Halfway through the race the top three in DPi were the #5 Cadillac, #10 Cadillac, and #77 Mazda. The #52 Oreca 07 was leading and the only car on the lead lap in the class. The #911 and #912 in second and third were chasing the #24 BMW. The #48 Lamborghini was leading over the #88 Audi and #44 Lamborghini.

Hour 13

The fourth place #12 AIM Vasser Sullivan Lexus RC F GT3 was delayed, preventing Shan Van Gisbergen from quickly entering the race. The #12 was not the only car losing time. Ten minutes later, the #6 Acura was a minute and a half off the lead, getting ever so close to being lapped. More mistakes in GTD would come as the class leading #48 Paul Miller Racing car was forced to serve a drive through penalty for illegal wheel rotation during a pit stop. As the two o’ clock hour started, Joao Barbosa in the #5 Cadillac was being challenged for the lead by the #10 of Kamui Kobayashi, and soon as the forty minute mark in the hour, after consistent pressure, Kobayashi would make the pass at turn one for the overall lead. His pace has been very quick ever since he entered the car, and twelve minutes before the end of the hour, he would lap the #6 Acura which was bottoming out at high speeds.

Hour 14

The #6 Acura would come into the pit to attempt to resolve the bottoming out issue about fifteen minutes into the hour, changing the front bodywork as well. Forty minutes into the hour, another Acura would suffer from a problem, this time in the GTD class. The Meyer Shank Racing team had to fix its #86 car's front splitter. Towards the end of the hour, brake changes and driver changes in the GTD class places the #44 GRT Magnus Racing entry in the lead.

Hour 15

The #48 Lamborghini would move into first place in GTD after passing the #44 Lamborghini. Later in the hour, the battle at the front of the GTLM would return, with the #24 BMW M8 GTE and the #912 Porsche 911 RSR-19. Porsche's Mathieu Jaminet erased a solid lead that the leader Chaz Mostert had in GTLM upfront within thirty minutes. Soon the #912 would get past the #24 by virtue of a driver change, which placed Jesse Krohn in the #24 and cold tires when the #24 BMW rejoined the track.

Hour 16

Eleven minutes into hour sixteen, Mathieu Jaminet would gain a little more than a second lead on Jesse Krohn in the #24 BMW. Outside the battle for first, the #911 in third had a battle on its hands with the only competitive Corvette, the #3 C8.R of Antonio Garcia. The #9 Pfaff Porsche went behind the wall thirty-five minutes into the hour. Fifteen minutes before the end of the hour, the leading #912 Porsche in the hands of Laurens Vanthoor was passed by Jesse Krohn in the #24 BMW in the international horseshoe. By the forty-fifth minute in the hour, the Mazda #77 would gain steadily on the lead of the race, advancing past the #31 Whelen Engineering Cadillac of Felipe Nasr, trailing the #5 Mustang Sampling Cadillac in second place.

Hour 17

Going into the early morning, in the six o’ clock hour, the #24 BMW M8 GTE performed a pit stop for a brake change. When the car rejoined the track, it was a minute out of the lead. Renger van der Zande in the #10 Cadillac continued to pave the way at the front of the field, getting ever so closer to the back of the last car on the lead lap in the DPi field, the pole-sitting #77 Mazda. Later in the hour, the #10 would set the fastest race lap up to this point of 1:34.6. The #9 Pfaff Porsche, which was running well earlier in the race, returned to the action back on track, at current being out of contention for class honors of any sort.

Hour 18

This hour would mark the longest green flag run in the history of the 24 Hours of Daytona running. The #4 Corvette would also make a re-entrance back into the race after a lengthy garage stay fifteen minutes into the hour. The #10 Cadillac was also able to lap the #77 Mazda at seven o’ clock, meaning that the #10 and #5 Cadillacs were the only cars on the lead lap of the race overall. The #10 also was ahead of the field on pit strategy. Forty minutes into the hour, the #52 PR1/Mathiasen Motorsports Oreca, who was leading LMP2, came into the pit to fix an internal issue, and as a result the lead switched hands to the #81 DragonSpeed car. Two bent toe links were the reason for the stop, and the car rejoined the track four laps down. Five minutes before the end of the hour, the #31 Whelen Engineering Cadillac, which was moving on the apron of the speedway slowly came into the pit to replace a flat tire. The problem gives the #55 fourth place, two laps down off the lead.

Hour 19

The long green flag run would come to an end as the #74 Riley Motorsports Mercedes-AMG GT3 was smoking heavily. With the full course caution, both Mazda prototypes were placed back on the lead lap behind the #10 and #5 Cadillacs. The #81 DragonSpeed Oreca 07 lead by three laps over the #52 Oreca 07. In GTLM, the #912 and #911 Porsches were first and second, while the #24 BMW stood in third. The #3 Corvette was in fourth. All four GTLM cars were on the lead lap. The #48 Paul Miller Lamborghini was leading the #88 WRT Speedstar entry, and #44 GRT Magnus Racing Lamborghini. The #16 Wright Motorsports Porsche sat in fourth. Thirty minutes into the hour, the race went back to green flag conditions. Quickly out of the caution, the #10 Wayne Taylor Racing Cadillac received a sixty-second stop and hold penalty for a red light violation during their last pit stop, handing the lead over to the #5 Cadillac driven by Loic Duval. The #55 Mazda had an exhaust issue thirty-five minutes into the hour. About ten minutes to go in the hour, the first place #5 Cadillac was nearing a lead of ten seconds.

Hour 20

The fifth full course caution led off the hour at the NASCAR turn three area, with the #19 GEAR Racing Lamborghini coming to a fiery halt on the apron. Christina Nielsen, driving the car at the time was able to get out safely, but the damage was terminal for the #19 team. During the time under yellow, the #10 Cadillac was able to get back on the lead lap by virtue of a wave around (to get back on the lead lap). An emergency pit stop for the #77 (a pit stop while pit lane was closed), promoted the #55 to second. The #62 Ferrari GTLM and #57 Acura GTD also were able to wave around to place themselves back on the lead lap in their respective classes. At nine o’ clock in the morning, the race resumed back to green flag conditions. The #55 Mazda struggling with an exhaust issue, was passed by both its sister car, the #77 and the #10. The #912 which had the lead entering green flag conditions was under pressure once again from the #24 BMW M8 GTE, driven by John Edwards, coming close to making contact at a time. Within the next couple of minutes, Edwards would make the pass in the first turn for the lead. Thirteen minutes into the green flag stint, the sixth full course caution would come out, with the #47 Precision Performance Lamborghini stopped in the infield. The race resumed to normal after ten minutes, and the #5 Cadillac got out to a four-second lead quickly. The #48 Lamborghini also took the lead in the GTD class, passing the #88 Audi R8 LMS. The #52 Oreca 07 regained a lap to be back on the lead lap of LMP2, eighteen seconds behind the #81 Oreca 07. With nine minutes to go in the hour, the #10 Cadillac of Ryan Briscoe passed the #77 Mazda for second place. Five minutes to go in the hour, the #912 Porsche took the lead in GTLM as the German battle continued. Two minutes to go in the hour, the #77 Mazda took a pit stop ahead of Cadillacs #5 and #10.

Hour 21

The #5 and #10 Cadillacs came into the pit. However, the #10 would have a quicker pit stop than the #5, and the #10 Wayne Taylor Racing Cadillac would gain the lead. The #912 Porsche would retain the lead through the GTLM leaders taking their pit stops. The #5 Mustang Sampling Racing Cadillac took a pit thirty minutes into the hour, making a driver change. Sebastian Bourdais went inside the car. The #77 Mazda gained second place off the change. The #10 Cadillac still leads and is three laps ahead on fuel to the #77 Mazda. By the end of the hour, the #10 would have a lead of over twenty seconds.

Hour 22

Ten minutes into the hour, Tristan Nunez got back in the #77 Mazda. Five minutes later, the #10 Cadillac stopped and Kamui Kobayashi took over the controls. Forty-three minutes into the hour, the GTLM lead was in the hands of the #24 BMW, over the #912 Porsche. The #3 Corvette was sitting in fifth, recently coming out pits, off cycle in comparison to the GTLM leaders. The #44 GRT Magnus Racing Lamborghini, in third place at that point in the race should be leading went the next pit stops happen for the cars ahead.

Hour 23

In the first ten minutes of the hour, the #24 and #912 battled for first place in GTLM and the Lamborghinis of #44 and #48 battled for first place in GTD. The #48 Lamborghini would get the lead after the #44 made a pit stop. Fifteen minutes after noon on Sunday, the #62 Risi Competizione Ferrari driven by James Calado suffered a rear tire puncture. With nine minutes to go in the hour, the #24 came in for a pit stop as well as the #912. The #911 assumed the lead of GTLM.

Final Hour

Although the #24 BMW sat in second, it had ten more laps of fuel in contrast to the #911 Porsche, which meant it had a chance of a quicker last pit stop. The #24 would also add to the advantage by closing in on the #911 Porsche ten minutes into the final hour. In two more minutes, the #24 BMW would pass the #911 in the tri-oval area for the lead in GTLM. Nearing close to fifteen minutes in the final hour, the #24 BMW would make its final pit stop, taking only right side tires to hold its advantage over the Porsches, who both pitted, which sit second and third seven seconds out the lead. Just after the one o’ clock hour, the #10 Cadillac made its last pit stop. Kamui Kobayashi stayed in the car. The #24 BMW built a lead in GTLM over the Porsches since the last pit stop, who lost time battling each other. This would continue, and at the pace the leading BMW was going at, their window of opportunity of challenging for the lead would close. At 1:40 PM on Sunday, the checkered flag would wave, and Kamui Kobayashi driving the #10 Wayne Taylor Racing Cadillac DPi-V.R. would come across the line first overall.

This would be the second year in a row that Wayne Taylor Racing has won the event, and the third time out of the past four years (since the DPi era started) that the team won the 24 hour event. Scott Dixon and Ryan Briscoe joined returning drivers and previous winners Renger van der Zande and Kamui Kobayashi as overall winners. Second on the podium was the Joest Racing #77 Mazda of Oliver Jarvis, Olivier Pla, and Tristan Nunez. This was the first time that Mazda as a manufacturer had finished the 24 Hours of Daytona classified. The #5 Mustang Sampling/JDC Motorsports Cadillac entry of Joao Barbosa, Loic Duval, and Sébastien Bourdais finished third for the overall podium. The LMP2 victory went to the DragonSpeed Oreca 07 of Colin Braun, Herik Hedman, Ben Hanley, and Harrison Newey. Second was the PR1/Mathiasen Motorsports Oreca 07 entry of Gabriel Aubry, Nicholas Boulle, Ben Keating, and Simon Trummer. Further back in third was the Oreca 07 of Era Motorsports driven by Ryan Lewis, Dwight Merriman, Nicolas Minassian, and Kyle Tilley.

The war in GTLM class was won over by BMW Team RLL in the #24 BMW M8 GTE, composed of the driver lineup of Jesse Krohn, Augusto Farfus, John Edwards, and Chaz Mostert.Second and third was taken by the Porsche GT Team and their Porsche 911 RSR-19's. Second place went to the #912 driven by Earl Bamber, Laurens Vanthoor, and Mathieu Jaminet. The #911 took third, raced by Nick Tandy, Fredric Makowiecki, and Matt Campbell. The GTD category was won by the #48 Paul Miller Racing Lamborghini Huracan GT3 Evo's driver lineup of Bryan Sellers, Madison Snow, Corey Lewis, and Andrea Caldarelli. Second place was the #44 GRT Magnus Racing team of Andy Lally, Marco Mapelli, John Potter, and Spencer Pumpelly. Third was the #88 WRT Speedstar Audi Sport entry of Mirko Bortolotti, Rolf Ineichen, Daniel Morad, and Dries Vanthoor.

=== Post-race ===
Since it was the season's first race, Briscoe, van der Zande, Dixon, and Kobayashi led the DPi Drivers' Championship with 35 points each. Jarvis, Nunez, and Pla were second with 32 points. Bourdais, Barbosa, and Duval were third with 30 points. Edwards, Krohn, Farfus, and Mostert led the GTLM Drivers' Championship with 35 points each. Bamber, Laurens Vanthoor, and Jaminet were second with 32 points. Makowiecki, Tandy, and Campbell were third with 30 points. Sellers, Snow, lewis, and Caldarelli led the GTD Drivers' Championship, followed by the second-placed Lally, Potter, Pumpelly, and Mapelli. Bortolotti, Ineichen, Morad, and Dires Vanthoor were third. Konica Minolta Cadillac DPi-V.R, BMW Team RLL, and Paul Miller Racing became the leaders of their respective class Teams' Championships. LMP2 teams and drivers didn't score points due to the event only counting towards the Michelin Endurance Cup. Cadillac, BMW, and Lamborghini assumed the lead of their respective Manufacturers' Championships with ten races left in the season.

== Results ==
Class winners denoted in bold and with ‡

Pos	Class	No.	Team / Entrant	Drivers	Chassis	Laps	Time/Retired
Pos	Class	No.	Team / Entrant	Drivers	Engine	Laps	Time/Retired
1	**DPi**	**10**	**(United States) Konica Minolta Cadillac**	**(Australia) Ryan Briscoe (New Zealand) Scott Dixon (Japan) Kamui Kobayashi (Netherlands) Renger van der Zande**	**Cadillac DPi-V.R**	**833**	**24:00:33.494‡**
1	**DPi**	**10**	**(United States) Konica Minolta Cadillac**	**(Australia) Ryan Briscoe (New Zealand) Scott Dixon (Japan) Kamui Kobayashi (Netherlands) Renger van der Zande**	**Cadillac 5.5 L V8**	**833**	**24:00:33.494‡**
2	DPi	77	(Germany) Mazda Team Joest	(United Kingdom) Oliver Jarvis (United States) Tristan Nunez (France) Olivier Pla	Mazda RT24-P	833	+1:05.426
2	DPi	77	(Germany) Mazda Team Joest	(United Kingdom) Oliver Jarvis (United States) Tristan Nunez (France) Olivier Pla	Mazda MZ-2.0T 2.0 L Turbo I4	833	+1:05.426
3	DPi	5	(United States) JDC-Mustang Sampling Racing	(Portugal) João Barbosa (France) Sébastien Bourdais (France) Loïc Duval	Cadillac DPi-V.R	833	+1:25.585
3	DPi	5	(United States) JDC-Mustang Sampling Racing	(Portugal) João Barbosa (France) Sébastien Bourdais (France) Loïc Duval	Cadillac 5.5 L V8	833	+1:25.585
4	DPi	6	(United States) Acura Team Penske	(United States) Dane Cameron (Colombia) Juan Pablo Montoya (France) Simon Pagenaud	Acura ARX-05	828	+5 Laps
4	DPi	6	(United States) Acura Team Penske	(United States) Dane Cameron (Colombia) Juan Pablo Montoya (France) Simon Pagenaud	Acura AR35TT 3.5 L Turbo V6	828	+5 Laps
5	DPi	85	(United States) JDC-Miller MotorSports	(Brazil) Matheus Leist (United States) Chris Miller (Colombia) Juan Piedrahita (France) Tristan Vautier	Cadillac DPi-V.R	825	+8 Laps
5	DPi	85	(United States) JDC-Miller MotorSports	(Brazil) Matheus Leist (United States) Chris Miller (Colombia) Juan Piedrahita (France) Tristan Vautier	Cadillac 5.5 L V8	825	+8 Laps
6	DPi	55	(Germany) Mazda Team Joest	(United States) Jonathan Bomarito (United States) Ryan Hunter-Reay (United Kingdom) Harry Tincknell	Mazda RT24-P	823	+10 Laps
6	DPi	55	(Germany) Mazda Team Joest	(United States) Jonathan Bomarito (United States) Ryan Hunter-Reay (United Kingdom) Harry Tincknell	Mazda MZ-2.0T 2.0 L Turbo I4	823	+10 Laps
7	DPi	31	(United States) Whelen Engineering Racing	(Portugal) Filipe Albuquerque (United Kingdom) Mike Conway (Brazil) Pipo Derani (Brazil) Felipe Nasr	Cadillac DPi-V.R	822	+11 Laps
7	DPi	31	(United States) Whelen Engineering Racing	(Portugal) Filipe Albuquerque (United Kingdom) Mike Conway (Brazil) Pipo Derani (Brazil) Felipe Nasr	Cadillac 5.5 L V8	822	+11 Laps
8	DPi	7	(United States) Acura Team Penske	(Brazil) Hélio Castroneves (United States) Alexander Rossi (United States) Ricky Taylor	Acura ARX-05	811	+22 Laps
8	DPi	7	(United States) Acura Team Penske	(Brazil) Hélio Castroneves (United States) Alexander Rossi (United States) Ricky Taylor	Acura AR35TT 3.5 L Turbo V6	811	+22 Laps
9	**LMP2**	**81**	**(United States) DragonSpeed USA**	**(United States) Colin Braun (United Kingdom) Ben Hanley (Sweden) Henrik Hedman (United Kingdom) Harrison Newey**	**Oreca 07**	**811**	**+22 Laps‡**
9	**LMP2**	**81**	**(United States) DragonSpeed USA**	**(United States) Colin Braun (United Kingdom) Ben Hanley (Sweden) Henrik Hedman (United Kingdom) Harrison Newey**	**Gibson Technology GK428 4.2 L V8**	**811**	**+22 Laps‡**
10	LMP2	52	(United States) PR1/Mathiasen Motorsports	(France) Gabriel Aubry (United States) Nicholas Boulle (United States) Ben Keating (Switzerland) Simon Trummer	Oreca 07	809	+24 Laps
10	LMP2	52	(United States) PR1/Mathiasen Motorsports	(France) Gabriel Aubry (United States) Nicholas Boulle (United States) Ben Keating (Switzerland) Simon Trummer	Gibson Technology GK428 4.2 L V8	809	+24 Laps
11	LMP2	18	(United States) Era Motorsports	(United Kingdom) Ryan Lewis (United States) Dwight Merriman (France) Nicolas Minassian (United Kingdom) Kyle Tilley	Oreca 07	800	+33 Laps
11	LMP2	18	(United States) Era Motorsports	(United Kingdom) Ryan Lewis (United States) Dwight Merriman (France) Nicolas Minassian (United Kingdom) Kyle Tilley	Gibson Technology GK428 4.2 L V8	800	+33 Laps
12	LMP2	8	(United States) Tower Motorsports by Starworks	(United Kingdom) Ryan Dalziel (Canada) John Farano (Denmark) David Heinemeier Hansson (France) Nicolas Lapierre	Oreca 07	798	+35 Laps
12	LMP2	8	(United States) Tower Motorsports by Starworks	(United Kingdom) Ryan Dalziel (Canada) John Farano (Denmark) David Heinemeier Hansson (France) Nicolas Lapierre	Gibson Technology GK428 4.2 L V8	798	+35 Laps
13	**GTLM**	**24**	**(United States) BMW Team RLL**	**(United States) John Edwards (Brazil) Augusto Farfus (Finland) Jesse Krohn (Australia) Chaz Mostert**	**BMW M8 GTE**	**786**	**+47 Laps‡**
13	**GTLM**	**24**	**(United States) BMW Team RLL**	**(United States) John Edwards (Brazil) Augusto Farfus (Finland) Jesse Krohn (Australia) Chaz Mostert**	**BMW S63 4.0 L Twin-turbo V8**	**786**	**+47 Laps‡**
14	GTLM	912	(United States) Porsche GT Team	(New Zealand) Earl Bamber (France) Mathieu Jaminet (Belgium) Laurens Vanthoor	Porsche 911 RSR-19	786	+47 Laps
14	GTLM	912	(United States) Porsche GT Team	(New Zealand) Earl Bamber (France) Mathieu Jaminet (Belgium) Laurens Vanthoor	Porsche 4.2 L Flat-6	786	+47 Laps
15	GTLM	911	(United States) Porsche GT Team	(Australia) Matt Campbell (France) Frédéric Makowiecki (United Kingdom) Nick Tandy	Porsche 911 RSR-19	786	+47 Laps
15	GTLM	911	(United States) Porsche GT Team	(Australia) Matt Campbell (France) Frédéric Makowiecki (United Kingdom) Nick Tandy	Porsche 4.2 L Flat-6	786	+47 Laps
16	GTLM	3	(United States) Corvette Racing	(Netherlands) Nicky Catsburg (Spain) Antonio García (United States) Jordan Taylor	Chevrolet Corvette C8.R	785	+48 Laps
16	GTLM	3	(United States) Corvette Racing	(Netherlands) Nicky Catsburg (Spain) Antonio García (United States) Jordan Taylor	Chevrolet 5.5 L V8	785	+48 Laps
17	GTLM	25	(United States) BMW Team RLL	(United States) Connor De Phillippi (Austria) Philipp Eng (United States) Colton Herta (Canada) Bruno Spengler	BMW M8 GTE	772	+61 Laps
17	GTLM	25	(United States) BMW Team RLL	(United States) Connor De Phillippi (Austria) Philipp Eng (United States) Colton Herta (Canada) Bruno Spengler	BMW S63 4.0 L Twin-turbo V8	772	+61 Laps
18	**GTD**	**48**	**(United States) Paul Miller Racing**	**(Italy) Andrea Caldarelli (United States) Corey Lewis (United States) Bryan Sellers (United States) Madison Snow**	**Lamborghini Huracán GT3 Evo**	**765**	**+68 Laps‡**
18	**GTD**	**48**	**(United States) Paul Miller Racing**	**(Italy) Andrea Caldarelli (United States) Corey Lewis (United States) Bryan Sellers (United States) Madison Snow**	**Lamborghini 5.2 L V10**	**765**	**+68 Laps‡**
19	GTD	44	(United States) GRT Magnus	(United States) Andy Lally (Italy) Marco Mapelli (United States) John Potter (United States) Spencer Pumpelly	Lamborghini Huracán GT3 Evo	765	+68 Laps
19	GTD	44	(United States) GRT Magnus	(United States) Andy Lally (Italy) Marco Mapelli (United States) John Potter (United States) Spencer Pumpelly	Lamborghini 5.2 L V10	765	+68 Laps
20	GTD	88	(Canada) WRT Speedstar Audi Sport	(Italy) Mirko Bortolotti (Switzerland) Rolf Ineichen (Canada) Daniel Morad (Belgium) Dries Vanthoor	Audi R8 LMS Evo	764	+69 Laps
20	GTD	88	(Canada) WRT Speedstar Audi Sport	(Italy) Mirko Bortolotti (Switzerland) Rolf Ineichen (Canada) Daniel Morad (Belgium) Dries Vanthoor	Audi 5.2 L V10	764	+69 Laps
21	GTD	16	(United States) Wright Motorsports	(Austria) Klaus Bachler (United States) Ryan Hardwick (United States) Anthony Imperato (United States) Patrick Long	Porsche 911 GT3 R	764	+69 Laps
21	GTD	16	(United States) Wright Motorsports	(Austria) Klaus Bachler (United States) Ryan Hardwick (United States) Anthony Imperato (United States) Patrick Long	Porsche 4.0 L Flat-6	764	+69 Laps
22	GTD	54	(United States) Black Swan Racing	(Netherlands) Jeroen Bleekemolen (United States) Trenton Estep (Germany) Sven Müller (United States) Tim Pappas	Porsche 911 GT3 R	763	+70 Laps
22	GTD	54	(United States) Black Swan Racing	(Netherlands) Jeroen Bleekemolen (United States) Trenton Estep (Germany) Sven Müller (United States) Tim Pappas	Porsche 4.0 L Flat-6	763	+70 Laps
23	GTD	96	(United States) Turner Motorsport	(United States) Bill Auberlen (United States) Robby Foley (Germany) Jens Klingmann (United States) Dillon Machavern	BMW M6 GT3	763	+70 Laps
23	GTD	96	(United States) Turner Motorsport	(United States) Bill Auberlen (United States) Robby Foley (Germany) Jens Klingmann (United States) Dillon Machavern	BMW 4.4 L Turbo V8	763	+70 Laps
24	GTD	63	(United States) Scuderia Corsa	(Italy) Alessandro Balzan (United States) Cooper MacNeil (Finland) Toni Vilander (United States) Jeff Westphal	Ferrari 488 GT3 Evo 2020	763	+70 Laps
24	GTD	63	(United States) Scuderia Corsa	(Italy) Alessandro Balzan (United States) Cooper MacNeil (Finland) Toni Vilander (United States) Jeff Westphal	Ferrari F154CB 3.9 L Turbo V8	763	+70 Laps
25	GTD	57	(United States) Heinricher Racing with MSR Curb-Agajanian	(United States) A. J. Allmendinger (Canada) Misha Goikhberg (United States) Trent Hindman (Portugal) Álvaro Parente	Acura NSX GT3 Evo	762	+71 Laps
25	GTD	57	(United States) Heinricher Racing with MSR Curb-Agajanian	(United States) A. J. Allmendinger (Canada) Misha Goikhberg (United States) Trent Hindman (Portugal) Álvaro Parente	Acura 3.5 L Turbo V6	762	+71 Laps
26	GTD	14	(Canada) AIM Vasser Sullivan	(United States) Kyle Busch (United States) Parker Chase (United Kingdom) Jack Hawksworth (United States) Michael de Quesada	Lexus RC F GT3	757	+76 Laps
26	GTD	14	(Canada) AIM Vasser Sullivan	(United States) Kyle Busch (United States) Parker Chase (United Kingdom) Jack Hawksworth (United States) Michael de Quesada	Lexus 5.0 L V8	757	+76 Laps
27 DNF	LMP2	38	(United States) Performance Tech Motorsports	(Canada) Cameron Cassels (United States) Kyle Masson (United States) Robert Masson (United States) Don Yount	Oreca 07	756	suspension
27 DNF	LMP2	38	(United States) Performance Tech Motorsports	(Canada) Cameron Cassels (United States) Kyle Masson (United States) Robert Masson (United States) Don Yount	Gibson Technology GK428 4.2 L V8	756	suspension
28	GTD	86	(United States) Meyer Shank Racing with Curb-Agajanian	(Germany) Mario Farnbacher (France) Jules Gounon (United States) Matt McMurry (Japan) Shinya Michimi	Acura NSX GT3 Evo	747	+86 Laps
28	GTD	86	(United States) Meyer Shank Racing with Curb-Agajanian	(Germany) Mario Farnbacher (France) Jules Gounon (United States) Matt McMurry (Japan) Shinya Michimi	Acura 3.5 L Turbo V6	747	+86 Laps
29	GTD	74	(United States) Riley Motorsports	(United States) Lawson Aschenbach (Brazil) Felipe Fraga (United States) Ben Keating (United States) Gar Robinson	Mercedes-AMG GT3 Evo	740	+93 Laps
29	GTD	74	(United States) Riley Motorsports	(United States) Lawson Aschenbach (Brazil) Felipe Fraga (United States) Ben Keating (United States) Gar Robinson	Mercedes-AMG M159 6.2 L V8	740	+93 Laps
30 DNF	GTLM	62	(United States) Risi Competizione	(United Kingdom) James Calado (Italy) Alessandro Pier Guidi (Italy) Davide Rigon (Brazil) Daniel Serra	Ferrari 488 GTE Evo	738	puncture
30 DNF	GTLM	62	(United States) Risi Competizione	(United Kingdom) James Calado (Italy) Alessandro Pier Guidi (Italy) Davide Rigon (Brazil) Daniel Serra	Ferrari F154CB 3.9 L Turbo V8	738	puncture
31	GTD	12	(Canada) AIM Vasser Sullivan	(United States) Townsend Bell (New Zealand) Shane van Gisbergen (United States) Frankie Montecalvo (United States) Aaron Telitz	Lexus RC F GT3	728	+105 Laps
31	GTD	12	(Canada) AIM Vasser Sullivan	(United States) Townsend Bell (New Zealand) Shane van Gisbergen (United States) Frankie Montecalvo (United States) Aaron Telitz	Lexus 5.0 L V8	728	+105 Laps
32	GTD	9	(Canada) Pfaff Motorsports	(Germany) Lars Kern (Norway) Dennis Olsen (France) Patrick Pilet (Canada) Zacharie Robichon	Porsche 911 GT3 R	716	+117 Laps
32	GTD	9	(Canada) Pfaff Motorsports	(Germany) Lars Kern (Norway) Dennis Olsen (France) Patrick Pilet (Canada) Zacharie Robichon	Porsche 4.0 L Flat-6	716	+117 Laps
33	GTD	11	(Austria) GRT Grasser Racing Team	(Spain) Albert Costa (United States) Richard Heistand (France) Franck Perera (Netherlands) Steijn Schothorst	Lamborghini Huracán GT3 Evo	633	+200 Laps
33	GTD	11	(Austria) GRT Grasser Racing Team	(Spain) Albert Costa (United States) Richard Heistand (France) Franck Perera (Netherlands) Steijn Schothorst	Lamborghini 5.2 L V10	633	+200 Laps
34 DNF	GTD	47	(United States) Precision Performance Motorsports	(United States) Brandon Gdovic (United Kingdom) Johnathan Hoggard (United States) Mark Kvamme (United States) Eric Lux	Lamborghini Huracán GT3 Evo	608	gearbox
34 DNF	GTD	47	(United States) Precision Performance Motorsports	(United States) Brandon Gdovic (United Kingdom) Johnathan Hoggard (United States) Mark Kvamme (United States) Eric Lux	Lamborghini 5.2 L V10	608	gearbox
35 DNF	GTD	19	(Austria) GEAR Racing Powered by GRT Grasser	(Colombia) Tatiana Calderón (Switzerland) Rahel Frey (United Kingdom) Katherine Legge (Denmark) Christina Nielsen	Lamborghini Huracán GT3 Evo	471	fire
35 DNF	GTD	19	(Austria) GEAR Racing Powered by GRT Grasser	(Colombia) Tatiana Calderón (Switzerland) Rahel Frey (United Kingdom) Katherine Legge (Denmark) Christina Nielsen	Lamborghini 5.2 L V10	471	fire
36	GTLM	4	(United States) Corvette Racing	(Switzerland) Marcel Fässler (United Kingdom) Oliver Gavin (United States) Tommy Milner	Chevrolet Corvette C8.R	461	+372 Laps
36	GTLM	4	(United States) Corvette Racing	(Switzerland) Marcel Fässler (United Kingdom) Oliver Gavin (United States) Tommy Milner	Chevrolet 5.5 L V8	461	+372 Laps
37 DNF	GTD	98	(United Kingdom) Aston Martin Racing	(United Kingdom) Ross Gunn (Portugal) Pedro Lamy (Austria) Mathias Lauda (United Kingdom) Andrew Watson	Aston Martin Vantage AMR GT3	189	crash
37 DNF	GTD	98	(United Kingdom) Aston Martin Racing	(United Kingdom) Ross Gunn (Portugal) Pedro Lamy (Austria) Mathias Lauda (United Kingdom) Andrew Watson	Aston Martin 4.0 L Turbo V8	189	crash
38 DNF	GTD	23	(United States) Heart of Racing Team	(Canada) Roman De Angelis (United Kingdom) Ian James (Spain) Alex Riberas (Denmark) Nicki Thiim	Aston Martin Vantage AMR GT3	151	crash
38 DNF	GTD	23	(United States) Heart of Racing Team	(Canada) Roman De Angelis (United Kingdom) Ian James (Spain) Alex Riberas (Denmark) Nicki Thiim	Aston Martin 4.0 L Turbo V8	151	crash

== Standings after the race ==
DPi Drivers' Championship standings
Pos.	Driver	Points
1	(Australia) Ryan Briscoe (Netherlands) Renger van der Zande (New Zealand) Scott Dixon (Japan) Kamui Kobayashi	35
2	(United Kingdom) Oliver Jarvis (United States) Tristan Nunez (France) Olivier Pla	32
3	(France) Sébastien Bourdais (Portugal) João Barbosa (France) Loïc Duval	30
4	(United States) Dane Cameron (Colombia) Juan Pablo Montoya (France) Simon Pagenaud	28
5	(France) Tristan Vautier (Brazil) Matheus Leist (United States) Chris Miller (Colombia) Juan Piedrahita	26

LMP2 Drivers' Championship standings
Pos.	Driver	Points
1	(United States) Colin Braun (Sweden) Henrik Hedman (United Kingdom) Ben Hanley (United Kingdom) Harrison Newey	0‡
2	(Switzerland) Simon Trummer (France) Gabriel Aubry (United States) Nicholas Boulle (United States) Ben Keating	0‡
3	(United States) Dwight Merriman (United Kingdom) Kyle Tilley (United Kingdom) Ryan Lewis (France) Nicolas Minassian	0‡
4	(Canada) John Farano (Denmark) David Heinemeier Hansson (United Kingdom) Ryan Dalziel (France) Nicolas Lapierre	0‡
5	(Canada) Cameron Cassels (United States) Kyle Masson (United States) Robert Masson (United States) Don Yount	0‡

GTLM Drivers' Championship standings
Pos.	Driver	Points
1	(United States) John Edwards (Finland) Jesse Krohn (Brazil) Augusto Farfus (Australia) Chaz Mostert	35
2	(New Zealand) Earl Bamber (Belgium) Laurens Vanthoor (France) Mathieu Jaminet	32
3	(France) Frédéric Makowiecki (United Kingdom) Nick Tandy (Australia) Matt Campbell	30
4	(Spain) Antonio García (United States) Jordan Taylor (Netherlands) Nicky Catsburg	28
5	(United States) Connor De Phillippi (Canada) Bruno Spengler (United States) Colton Herta (Austria) Philipp Eng	26

GTD Drivers' Championship standings
Pos.	Driver	Points
1	(United States) Bryan Sellers (United States) Madison Snow (United States) Corey Lewis (Italy) Andrea Caldarelli	35
2	(United States) Andy Lally (United States) John Potter (United States) Spencer Pumpelly (Italy) Marco Mapelli	32
3	(Italy) Mirko Bortolotti (Switzerland) Rolf Ineichen (Canada) Daniel Morad (Belgium) Dries Vanthoor	30
4	(United States) Ryan Hardwick (United States) Patrick Long (Austria) Klaus Bachler (United States) Anthony Imperato	28
5	(Netherlands) Jeroen Bleekemolen (United States) Trenton Estep (Germany) Sven Müller (United States) Tim Pappas	26

- ‡: Points only awarded towards Michelin Endurance Cup championship.
- Note: Only the top five positions are included for all sets of standings.

DPi Teams' Championship standings
Pos.	Team	Points
1	(United States) #10 Konica Minolta Cadillac DPi-V.R	35
2	(Germany) #77 Mazda Team Joest	32
3	(United States) #5 Mustang Sampling Racing / JDC-Miller MotorSports	30
4	(United States) #6 Acura Team Penske	28
5	(United States) #85 JDC-Miller MotorSports	26

LMP2 Teams' Championship standings
Pos.	Team	Points
1	(United States) #81 DragonSpeed USA	0‡
2	(United States) #52 PR1/Mathiasen Motorsports	0‡
3	(United States) #18 Era Motorsport	0‡
4	(United States) #8 Tower Motorsport by Starworks	0‡
5	(United States) #38 Performance Tech Motorsports	0‡

GTLM Teams' Championship standings
Pos.	Team	Points
1	(United States) #24 BMW Team RLL	35
2	(United States) #912 Porsche GT Team	32
3	(United States) #911 Porsche GT Team	30
4	(United States) #3 Corvette Racing	28
5	(United States) #25 BMW Team RLL	26

GTD Teams' Championship standings
Pos.	Team	Points
1	(United States) #48 Paul Miller Racing	35
2	(United States) #44 GRT Magnus	32
3	(Belgium) #88 WRT Speedstar Audi Sport	30
4	(United States) #16 Wright Motorsports	28
5	(United States) #54 Black Swan Racing	26

- ‡: Points only awarded towards Michelin Endurance Cup championship.
- Note: Only the top five positions are included for all sets of standings.

DPi Manufacturers' Championship standings
Pos.	Manufacturer	Points
1	(United States) Cadillac	35
2	(Japan) Mazda	32
3	(Japan) Acura	30

GTLM Manufacturers' Championship standings
Pos.	Manufacturer	Points
1	(Germany) BMW	35
2	(Germany) Porsche	32
3	(United States) Chevrolet	30
4	(Italy) Ferrari	28

GTD Manufacturers' Championship standings
Pos.	Manufacturer	Points
1	(Italy) Lamborghini	35
2	(Germany) Audi	32
3	(Germany) Porsche	30
4	(Germany) BMW	28
5	(Italy) Ferrari	26

- Note: Only the top five positions are included for all sets of standings.

IMSA SportsCar Championship
Previous race: none	2020 season	Next race: WeatherTech 240
