= Henrik Hedman =

Swedish racing driver (born 1968)

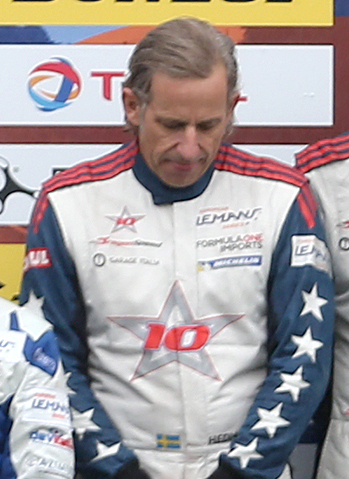
- Hedman in 2018
- Nationality: (Sweden) Swedish
- Born: 5 February 1968 (age 58) Stockholm, Sweden
- Categorisation: FIA Bronze

Per Henrik Daniel Hedman (born 5 February 1968 in Stockholm) is a Swedish businessman and racing driver who last competed for DragonSpeed in the IMSA SportsCar Championship's GTD class.

A long-time pay driver for DragonSpeed in LMP2, Hedman is a class winner at the 24 Hours of Le Mans and 24 Hours of Daytona, and an overall winner in the European Le Mans Series. He also competed in the LMP1 class of the FIA World Endurance Championship in 2018–19, under "temporary dispensation" from the ACO.

== Career ==
Hedman made his car racing debut in 2012, racing part-time in both the Maserati World Series and Ferrari Challenge North America for two seasons before joining the Pirelli World Challenge in 2014 with DragonSpeed. After finishing runner-up in the GTA standings, Hedman returned to the team and series for 2015, also taking part in the Blancpain Endurance Series with the same team, alongside Elton Julian and Thomas Kemenater in a Ferrari 458 GT3 for the full season.

Hedman then stepped up to Prototype competition for 2016, racing an Oreca 05 full-time in the LMP2 class of the European Le Mans Series alongside Ben Hanley and Nicolas Lapierre, whilst also making a one-off appearance at the IMSA SportsCar Championship at Sebring. After finishing fourth in the latter, Hedman then took his maiden win in car racing at the second-to-last round of the European Le Mans season at Spa, which, along with four other podiums, helped him to finish fourth in points at season's end.

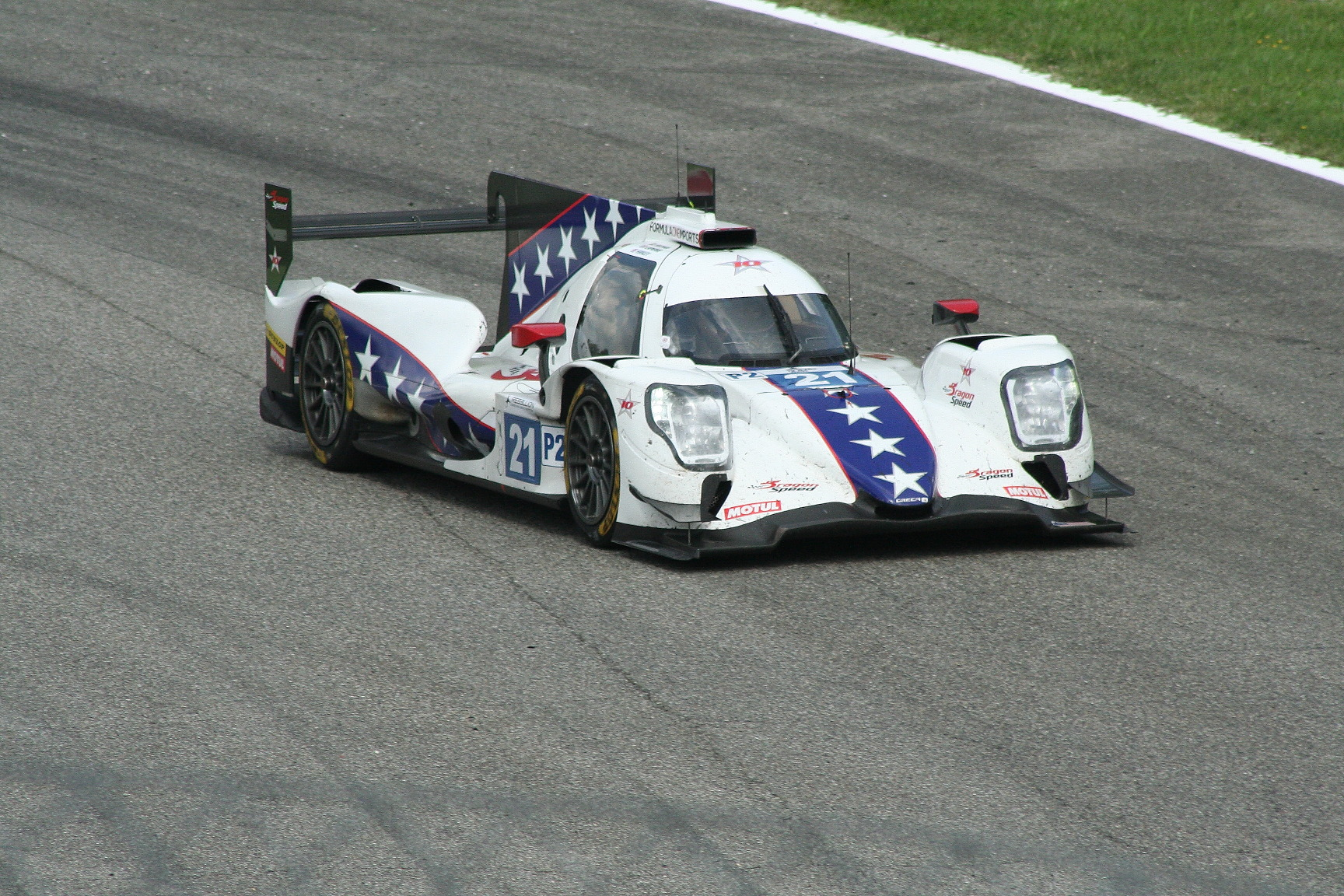
Hedman driving for DragonSpeed in LMP2 at Monza in 2017.

As DragonSpeed switched to the Oreca 07 ahead of 2017, Hedman remained in ELMS alongside Hanley and Lapierre, whilst also making his debut at the 24 Hours of Daytona in January. After retiring at Daytona, Hedman scored only one podium in the six-race season, finishing second at the second round at Monza, on his way to 11th in the LMP2 standings.

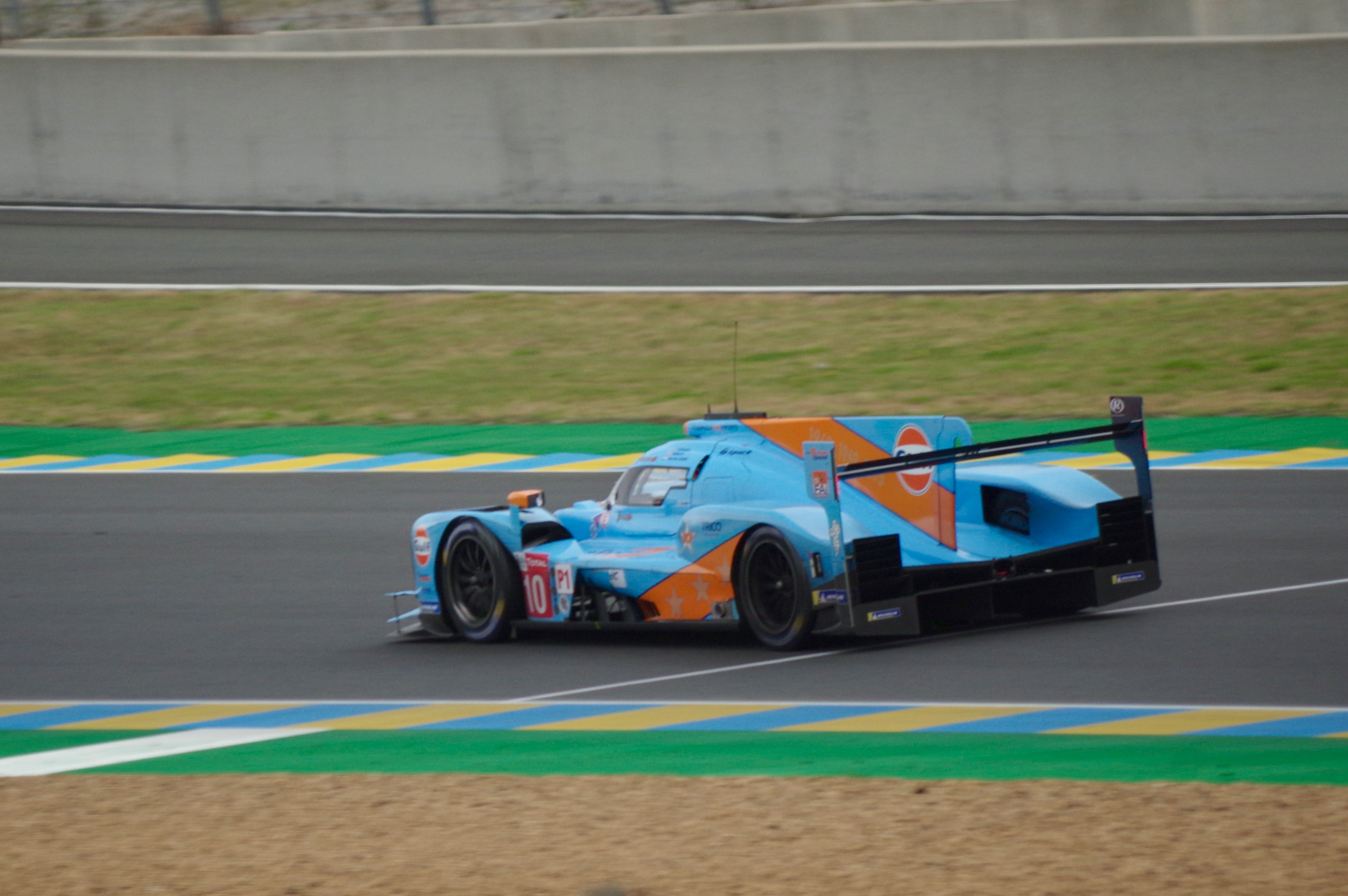
Hedman's Gulf-coloured DragonSpeed LMP1 at the 2019 24 Hours of Le Mans.

The following year, Hedman remained with DragonSpeed to make his FIA World Endurance Championship driving a BR Engineering BR1 in the LMP1 class alongside Hanley, and Renger van der Zande. Despite the LMP1 class requiring drivers to be at least Silver-rated, Hedman was able to get approval to race in the class. Racing only four times throughout the "Superseason", Hedman scored half a point at Silverstone. Alongside his LMP1 commitments, Hedman stayed with DragonSpeed for his third season in the European Le Mans Series alongside Hanley and Lapierre, with whom he scored two podiums both at Silverstone and Spa as he finished seventh in points.

Hedman stayed with DragonSpeed for his fourth consecutive full-time season in European Le Mans Series' LMP2 class alongside Hanley and James Allen. The trio ended the season seventh in points with a lone win at the season-opening round at Le Castellet. The Swede also took part in that year's 24 Hours of Daytona with the same team, running as high as second before retiring with two hours left after losing a wheel.

In 2020, Hedman stayed with DragonSpeed to compete in his first full-time season in the LMP2 class of the IMSA SportsCar Championship, sharing an Oreca 07 with Hanley for the full season and Colin Braun, Harrison Newey and Gustavo Menezes for the endurance rounds. Despite winning the 24 Hours of Daytona and the fourth round at Road America, DragonSpeed abruptly interrupted the program to focus their resources for that year's 24 Hours of Le Mans.

With DragonSpeed returning to the FIA World Championship after a one-year absence, so did Hedman, joining Hanley and Juan Pablo Montoya in the team's LMP2 Pro-Am entry. In the six-race season, the trio took a class win at the 24 Hours of Le Mans, along with three more podiums to finish fourth in the class standings. Also returning to ELMS in 2021, Hedman took part in the Pro-Am class in the first four rounds alongside Hanley and a rotating door of drivers.

Hedman scaled back his racing program for 2022, racing in the IMSA SportsCar Championship alongside Juan Pablo Montoya from Sebring onwards, as Sebastián Montoya joined them for the Michelin Endurance Cup. Hedman took a lone win at Mid-Ohio and two more podiums, at Laguna Seca and Road Atlanta, to finish fourth in the LMP2 standings.

Hedman then returned to the European Le Mans Series in 2023 alongside the Montoya father-son duo, where they only scored a best result of fifth twice and were seventh in the LMP2 Pro-Am points at season's end. Following that, Hedman made two one-off appearances in the IMSA SportsCar Championship in 2024, racing in LMP2 at Sebring, and racing a Ferrari 296 GT3 in GTD at Indianapolis.

After not racing in 2025, Hedman returned to DragonSpeed to field a Chevrolet Corvette Z06 GT3.R in the GTD class of the 2026 IMSA SportsCar Championship. After a crash at the 12 Hours of Sebring, in which he picked up an undisclosed injury, but competed in the following three races ahead of his withdrawal from the rest of the season. He was replaced by co-driver Casper Stevenson at Mosport, while Alec Udell replaced him at Road America and Indianapolis.

== Personal life ==
Hedman was born in Stockholm in 1968, and lives in Fort Lauderdale, Florida. Hedman co-founded Swedish investment firm Pan Capital in 1998 with Pär Olof Sandå and Claes-Henrik Julander, whom he had met while working at Swedbank. He has also managed several Florida-based companies, including 10 Star, his primary sponsor at DragonSpeed, and NAP Asset Acquisitions. Hedman was a director at two Maltese offshore companies that featured in the Paradise Papers, and set up another investment firm, KB18 Företagsförädling, in Örebro in 2013.

Hedman's son, William, is also a racing driver in GT America.

== Racing record ==
=== Racing career summary ===
Season	Series	Team	Races	Wins	Poles	F/Laps	Podiums	Points	Position
2012	Trofeo Maserati World Series		3	0	0	0	0	1	42nd
2012	Ferrari Challenge North America – Coppa Shell	Ferrari of Fort Lauderdale	10	0	0	0	0	45	12th
2013	Trofeo Maserati World Series		2	0	0	0	0	0	NC
2013	Ferrari Challenge North America – Trofeo Pirelli	Ferrari of Fort Lauderdale	1	0	0	0	0	0	NC
2014	Pirelli World Challenge – GT	DragonSpeed	16	0	0	0	0	723	9th
2014	Pirelli World Challenge – GTA	DragonSpeed	16	0	2	0	5	723	**2nd**
2014	Ferrari Challenge North America – Trofeo Pirelli	Ferrari of Fort Lauderdale	6	0	0	0	3	57	7th
2014	Ferrari Challenge Finali Mondiali – Am	Ferrari of Fort Lauderdale	1	0	0	0	0	0	16th
2015	Pirelli World Challenge – GT	DragonSpeed	12	0	0	0	0	362	28th
2015	Pirelli World Challenge – GTA	DragonSpeed	12	0	0	0	0	744	11th
2015	Blancpain Endurance Series – Pro-Am	DragonSpeed	5	0	0	0	0	1	29th
2015	Ferrari Challenge North America – Trofeo Pirelli Pro-Am	Scuderia Autoropa	2	0	0	0	0	0	NC
2016	IMSA SportsCar Championship – Prototype	DragonSpeed	1	0	0	0	0	29	26th
2016	European Le Mans Series – LMP2	DragonSpeed	6	1	0	0	4	76	4th
2016	Ferrari Challenge North America – Trofeo Pirelli	Ferrari of Fort Lauderdale	2	0	0	0	0	11	12th
2016	Ferrari Challenge Europe – Trofeo Pirelli Pro-Am	Scuderia Autoropa	5	0	0	0	5	75	6th
2016	Finali Mondiali – Trofeo Pirelli Pro-Am	Scuderia Autoropa	1	0	0	0	0	0	NC
2017	IMSA SportsCar Championship – Prototype	DragonSpeed	1	0	0	0	0	21	39th
2017	European Le Mans Series – LMP2	DragonSpeed	6	0	0	0	1	40	11th
2018	European Le Mans Series – LMP2	DragonSpeed	6	0	0	0	2	50.5	7th
2018–19	FIA World Endurance Championship – LMP1	DragonSpeed	4	0	0	0	0	0.5	40th
2019	IMSA SportsCar Championship – LMP2	DragonSpeed USA	1	0	0	0	1	30	13th
2019	European Le Mans Series – LMP2	DragonSpeed USA	6	1	0	0	1	48	7th
2019	24 Hours of Le Mans – LMP2	DragonSpeed USA	1	0	0	0	0	—N/a	DNF
2020	IMSA SportsCar Championship – LMP2	DragonSpeed USA	3	2	0	0	2	61	9th
2020	European Le Mans Series – LMP2	DragonSpeed USA	1	0	0	0	0	0	NC
2020	24 Hours of Le Mans – LMP2	DragonSpeed USA	1	0	0	0	0	—N/a	12th
2021	FIA World Endurance Championship – LMP2 Pro-Am	DragonSpeed USA	6	1	0	0	4	138	4th
2021	European Le Mans Series – LMP2 Pro-Am	DragonSpeed USA	4	0	0	0	0	14	17th
2022	IMSA SportsCar Championship – LMP2	DragonSpeed 10 Star	6	1	0	0	3	1878	4th
2023	European Le Mans Series – LMP2 Pro-Am	DragonSpeed USA	6	0	0	0	0	44	7th
2024	IMSA SportsCar Championship – LMP2	DragonSpeed	1	0	0	0	0	262	49th
2024	IMSA SportsCar Championship – GTD	DragonSpeed	1	0	0	0	0	190	67th
2026	IMSA SportsCar Championship – GTD	DragonSpeed	5	0	0	0	0	931	37th

=== Complete GT World Challenge Europe results ===
==== Complete Blancpain GT Series Endurance Cup ====
Year	Entrant	Class	Car	1	2	3	4	5	6	7	Rank	Points
2015	DragonSpeed	Pro-Am	Ferrari 458 GT3	MNZ; 37	SIL; 49	PAU; 29	SPA; 6H; 38	SPA; 12H; 36	SPA; 24H; Ret	NÜR; 51	29th	1

=== Complete IMSA SportsCar Championship results ===
(key) (Races in bold indicate pole position; races in italics indicate fastest lap)

Year	Entrant	Class	Make	Engine	1	2	3	4	5	6	7	8	9	10	Rank	Points	Ref
2016	DragonSpeed	P	Oreca 05	Nissan VK45DE 4.5 L V8	DAY	SEB; 4	LBH	LGA	DET	WGL	MOS	ELK	COA	PET	26th	29	
2017	DragonSpeed	P	Oreca 07	Gibson GK428 4.2 L V8	DAY; 10	SEB	LBH	COA	DET	WGL	MOS	ROA	LAG	PET	39th	21	
2019	DragonSpeed	LMP2	Oreca 07	Gibson GK428 4.2 L V8	DAY; 3	SEB	MDO	WGL	MOS	ELK	LGA	PET			13th	30	
2020	DragonSpeed USA	LMP2	Oreca 07	Gibson GK428 4.2 L V8	DAY; 1†	SEB; 5	ELK; 1	ATL	PET	LGA	SEB				9th	61	
2022	DragonSpeed - 10 Star	LMP2	Oreca 07	Gibson GK428 4.2 L V8	DAY	SEB; 8	LGA; 3	MOH; 1	WGL; 5	ELK; 6	PET; 2				4th	1878	
2024	DragonSpeed USA	LMP2	Oreca 07	Gibson GK428 4.2 L V8	DAY	SEB; 7			WGL	MOS	ELK				49th	262	
2024	DragonSpeed USA	GTD	Ferrari 296 GT3	Ferrari F163CE 3.0 L Turbo V6			LBH	LGA				VIR	IMS; 13	PET	67th	190	
2026	DragonSpeed	GTD	Chevrolet Corvette Z06 GT3.R	Chevrolet LT6.R 5.5 L V8	DAY; 16	SEB; 15	LBH; 11	LGA; 11	WGL; 16	MOS	ELK	VIR	IMS	PET	37th	931	

=== Complete European Le Mans Series results ===
(key) (Races in bold indicate pole position; results in italics indicate fastest lap)

Year	Entrant	Class	Chassis	Engine	1	2	3	4	5	6	Rank	Points
2016	DragonSpeed	LMP2	Oreca 05	Nissan VK45DE 4.5 L V8	SIL; Ret	IMO; 3	RBR; Ret	LEC; 3	SPA; 1	EST; 2	4th	76
2017	DragonSpeed	LMP2	Oreca 07	Gibson GK428 4.2 L V8	**SIL**; 10	MNZ; 2	RBR; Ret	LEC; 7	**SPA**; 5	ALG; 9	11th	40
2018	DragonSpeed	LMP2	Oreca 07	Gibson GK428 4.2 L V8	LEC; Ret	**MNZ**; 4	RBR; 5	SIL; 2	SPA; 2‡	ALG; 13	7th	50.5
2019	DragonSpeed	LMP2	Oreca 07	Gibson GK428 4.2 L V8	LEC; 1	MNZ; 10	CAT; 10	SIL; 4	SPA; 7	ALG; 9	7th	48
2020	DragonSpeed USA	LMP2	Oreca 07	Gibson GK428 4.2 L V8	LEC	SPA	LEC	MNZ; DSQ	ALG		NC	0
2021	DragonSpeed USA	LMP2 Pro-Am	Oreca 07	Gibson GK428 4.2 L V8	CAT; Ret	RBR; 6	LEC; WD	MNZ; 9	SPA	ALG	17th	14
2023	DragonSpeed USA	LMP2 Pro-Am	Oreca 07	Gibson GK428 4.2 L V8	CAT; 7	LEC; 7	ARA; 7	SPA; 7	ALG; 5	ALG; 5	7th	44

=== Complete 24 Hours of Le Mans results ===
Year	Team	Co-Drivers	Car	Class	Laps	Pos.	Class Pos.
2017	(United States) Dragonspeed - 10 Star	(United Kingdom) Ben Hanley (Sweden) Felix Rosenqvist	Oreca 07-Gibson	LMP2	343	14th	12th
2018	(United States) DragonSpeed	(United Kingdom) Ben Hanley (Netherlands) Renger van der Zande	BR Engineering BR1-Gibson	LMP1	244	DNF	DNF
2019	(United States) DragonSpeed	(United Kingdom) Ben Hanley (Netherlands) Renger van der Zande	BR Engineering BR1-Gibson	LMP1	76	DNF	DNF
2020	(United States) DragonSpeed USA	(United Kingdom) Ben Hanley (Netherlands) Renger van der Zande	Oreca 07-Gibson	LMP2	361	16th	12th
2021	(United States) DragonSpeed USA	(United Kingdom) Ben Hanley (Colombia) Juan Pablo Montoya	Oreca 07-Gibson	LMP2	356	15th	10th
2021	(United States) DragonSpeed USA	(United Kingdom) Ben Hanley (Colombia) Juan Pablo Montoya	Oreca 07-Gibson	LMP2 Pro-Am	356	15th	**1st**

=== Complete FIA World Endurance Championship results ===
(key) (Races in bold indicate pole position; races in italics indicate fastest lap)

Year	Entrant	Class	Chassis	Engine	1	2	3	4	5	6	7	8	Pos.	Points
2018–19	DragonSpeed	LMP1	BR Engineering BR1	Gibson GL458 4.5 V8	SPA; DNS	LMS; Ret	SIL; 25	FUJ	SHA	SEB; Ret	SPA	LMS; Ret	40th	0.5
