= DragonSpeed =

American racing team

(United States) DragonSpeed
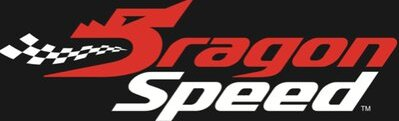
- Founded: 2007; 19 years ago
- Founder(s): Elton Julian
- Base: Concord, North Carolina, U.S.
- Team principal(s): Elton Julian
- Current series: Ferrari Challenge North America
- Former series: FIA World Endurance Championship; European Le Mans Series; American Le Mans Series; Pirelli World Challenge; Blancpain Endurance Series; IndyCar Series; IMSA WeatherTech SportsCar Championship
- Current drivers: William Hedman; TBA
- Teams' Championships: European Le Mans Series: LMP2 2017
- Drivers' Championships: Pirelli World Challenge: GTA 2015: Frank Montecalvo; European Le Mans Series: LMP2 2017: Memo Rojas, Léo Roussel

DragonSpeed, also known as DragonSpeedLLC, DragonSpeed - 10 Star or DragonSpeed Racing is an American auto racing team that competes in the Ferrari Challenge North America. The team has previously competed in IMSA WeatherTech SportsCar Championship European Le Mans Series, NTT IndyCar Series and the FIA World Endurance Championship, as well as 24h Le Mans.

In the 2021 24 Hours of Le Mans, Team DragonSpeed USA won the LMP2 Pro/Am Category, in an Oreca 07 #21, driven by Henrik Hedman, Ben Hanley and Juan Pablo Montoya. DragonSpeed are also three time winners of 24h of Daytona in the LMP2 category.

== History ==
=== First steps ===
In 2007, DragonSpeed, was founded by racing driver Elton Julian. Four years later the team made their race debut on Ferrari F430 Challenge in the GT category of the 2011 24 Hours of Daytona. They have finished 15th in the category and 29th overall. They missed 2012 racing season, and joined the Prototype Challenge class of the 2013 American Le Mans Series with Oreca FLM09-Chevrolet car. They finished sixth in the season standings, being the only team in the category to participate on the part-time schedule.

=== Pirelli World Challenge ===
DragonSpeed switched to the Pirelli World Challenge in 2014 with Henrik Hedman and Mike Hedlund behind the wheel of the Ferrari 458 GT3. Hedman finished ninth in the standings. Hedlund had only three rounds, ending 22nd. For the next year, the team switched to the Mercedes-Benz SLS AMG GT3. Hedlund was replaced by Frank Montecalvo and Eric Lux. Montecalvo won the GTA category title.

=== Blancpain Endurance Series ===
The team moved to Europe to compete in the Pro-Am Cup of the 2015 Blancpain Endurance Series. They used Ferrari 458 GT3 and fielded Hedman, Julian and Thomas Kemenater.

=== European Le Mans Series ===
In 2016, the team purchased an Oreca 05-Nissan car to compete in the LMP2 class of the European Le Mans Series with Hedman, Ben Hanley and Nicolas Lapierre. They had four podiums in six races, including a win at Spa. This was enough for fourth place in the LMP2 standings.

For 2017 the team bought two Oreca 07-Gibson cars. The car #21 retained the same Hedman-Hanley-Lapierre line-up, while car #22 was branded as G-Drive Racing with Memo Rojas, Léo Roussel as their full-time drivers. Ryō Hirakawa due to his Toyota commitments was forced to miss Red Bull Ring and Circuit Paul Ricard rounds. He was sustained by Nicolas Minassian. The team had their first double, winning Monza round. G-Drive branded car won the series after their five podiums in six races.

The team continued to stand out car #21 in the LMP2 category of the 2018 European Le Mans Series with the same line-up of drivers (Hedman-Hanley-Lapierre). The team had to enjoy a 5th place finish in the final standings, with two podium placements. DragonSpeed continued into the 2019 European Le Mans Series season with a small tweak in drivers, with Lapierre being replaced by James Allen.

As well as year before, the #21 also finished fifth, this time with a singular victory. In 2020, the main lineup became Memo Rojas, Ryan Cullen and Timothe Buret, as the team took into a collaboration with Racing Engineering. Team regulars, Hedman and Hanley, appeared in the fourth round of the championship, but their entry got disqualified from the round.

In 2021, DragonSpeed came back to fielding a lineup of Hedman and Hanley in the championship, with Menzenes,Montoya and Taylor joining them for various rounds. They however didn't race the full season, and out of four contested rounds, only finished two. The most recent outing of DragonSpeed in European Le Mans Series was in the 2023 season. The lineup of Henrik Hedman, Juan Pablo Montoya and his son, Sebastian Montoya, brought back a seventh position in the standings for LMP2 Pro/Am category.

=== FIA World Endurance Championship ===
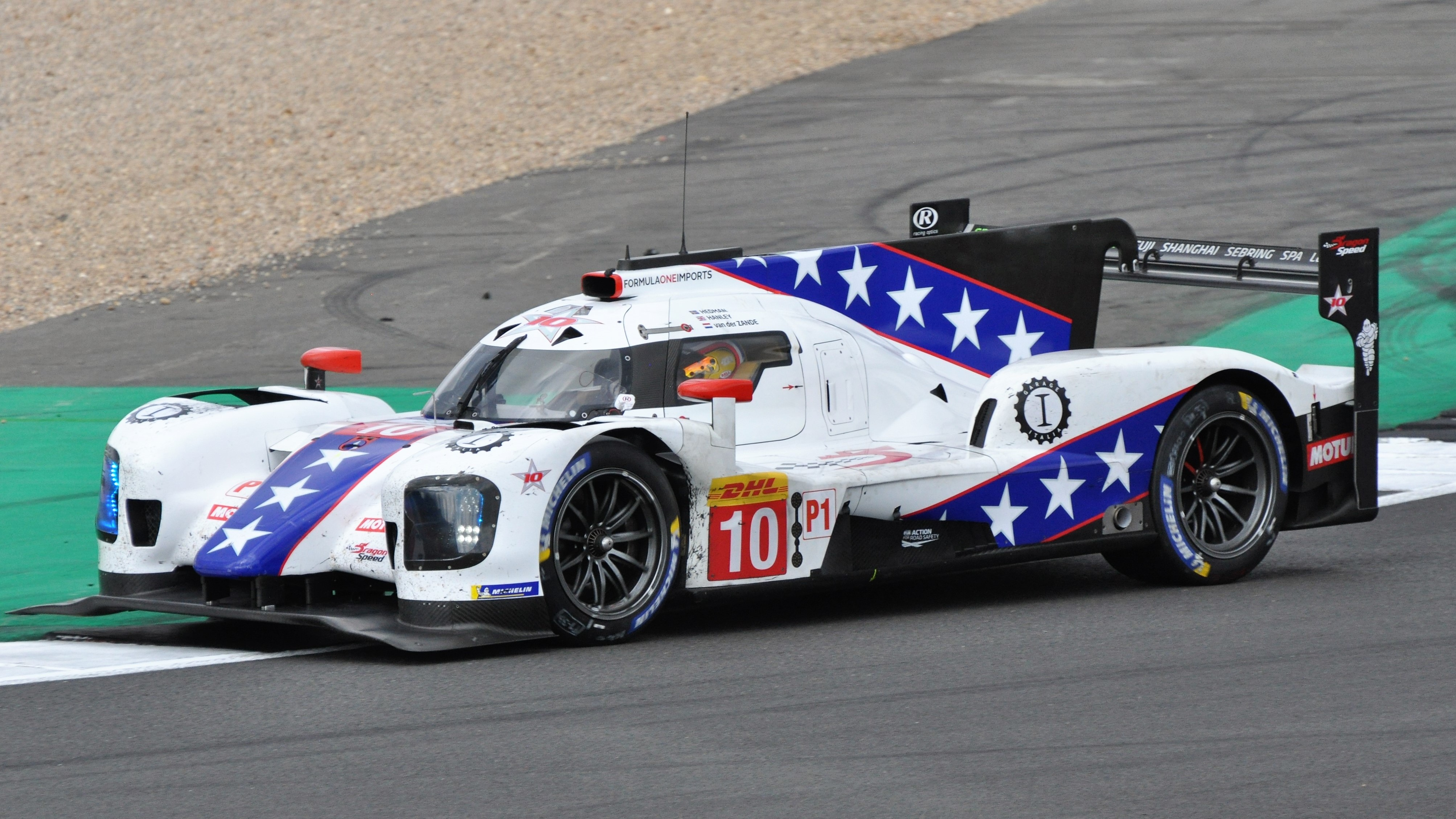
A DragonSpeed liveried BR Engineering BR1 LMP1 car, competing at Silverstone in 2018

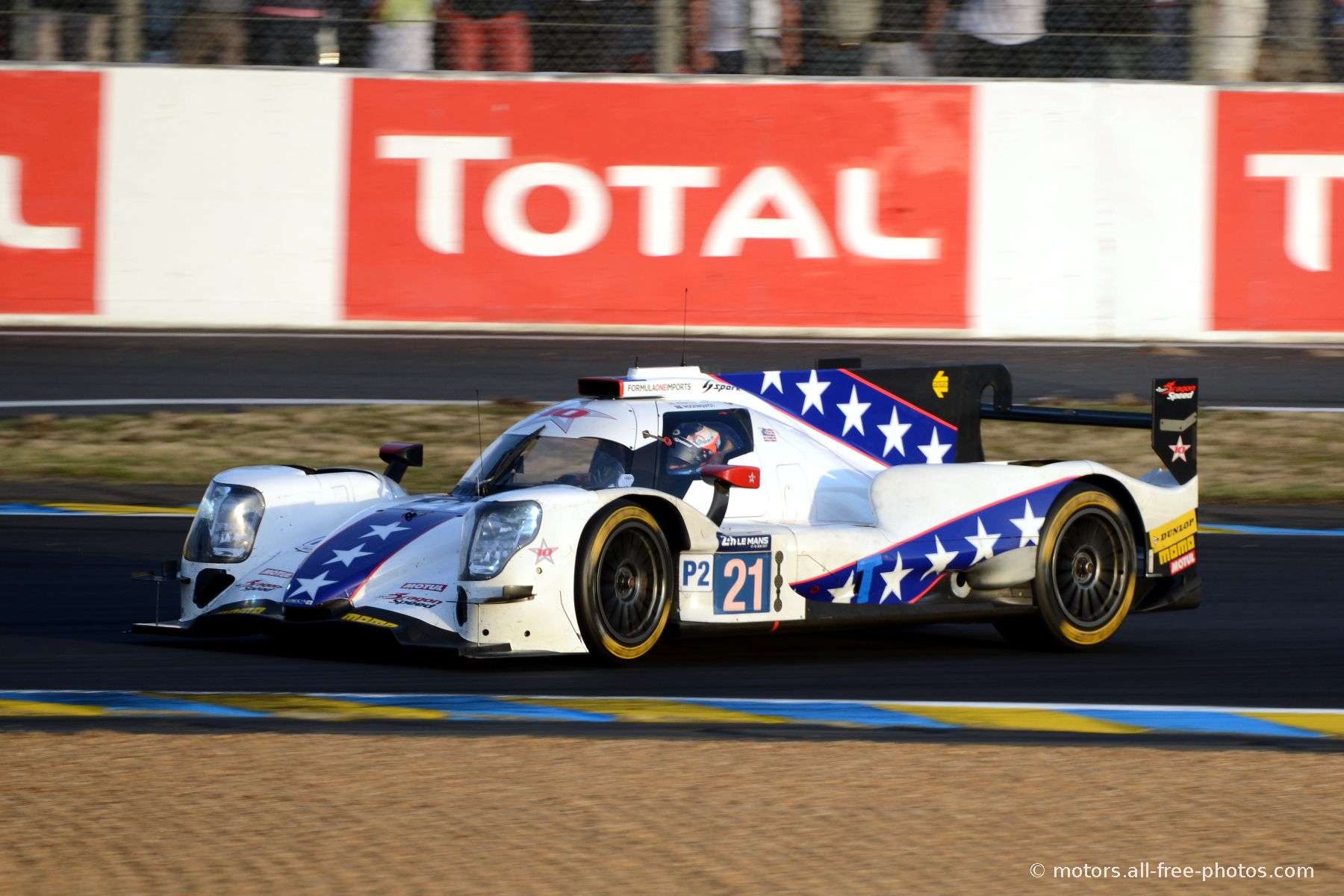
A DragonSpeed liveried Oreca 07 LMP2 car, competing at Le Mans in 2017

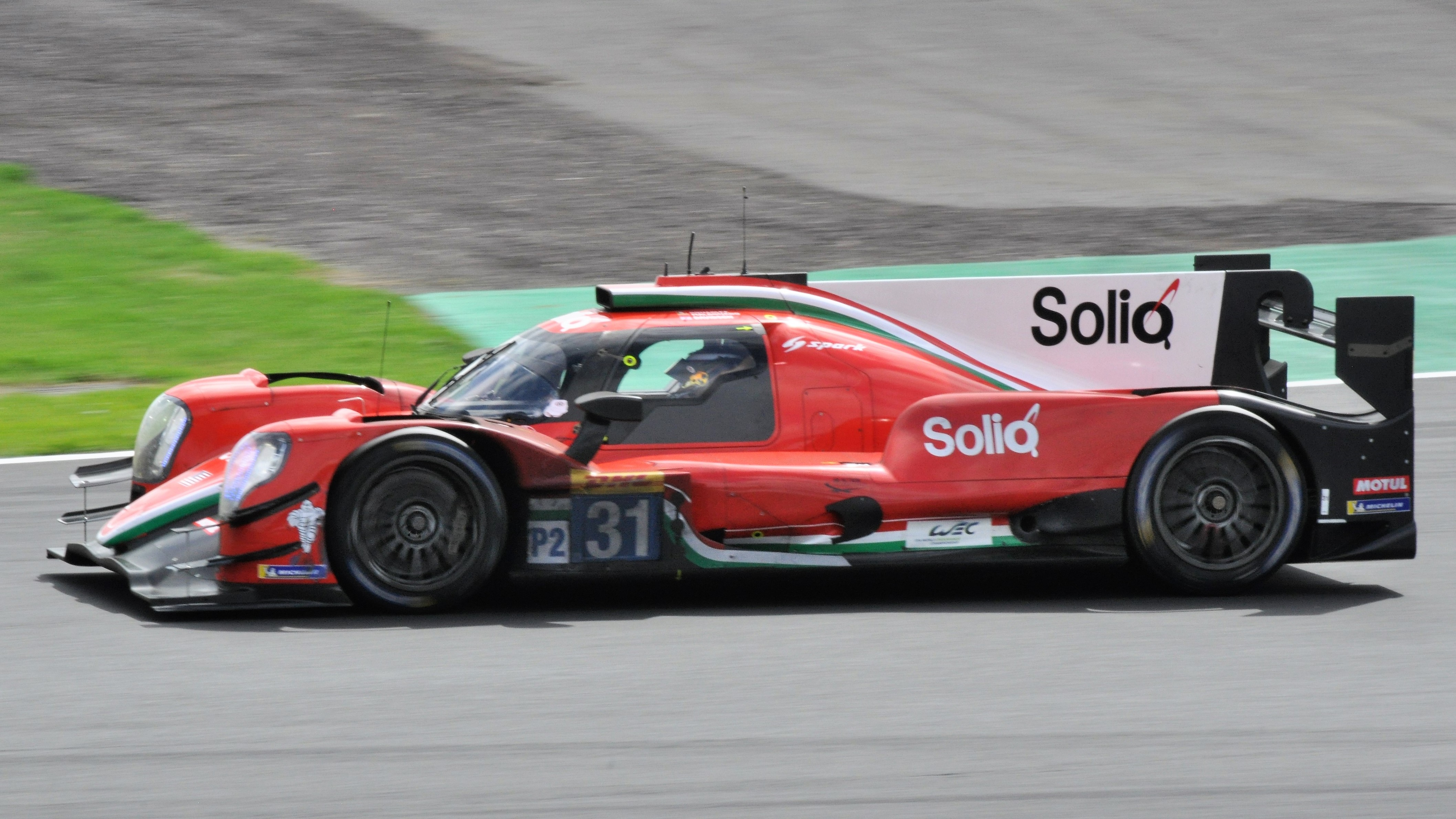
A DragonSpeed 'RGR Sport' liveried Oreca 07 LMP2 car, competing at Silverstone in 2018

DragonSpeed purchased BR Engineering BR1-Gibson car and made their debut in the LMP1 class of the FIA World Endurance Championship in 2018. Their LMP1 squad featured Henrik Hedman and Ben Hanley, as well as Pietro Fittipaldi for the first round. The Brazilian had to step down as an accident during qualifying the #10 BR-1 at Spa-Francorchamps broke bones in both of his legs. Renger van der Zande took over the third-driver duties, with James Allen stepping in when necessary.

In addition, the team were represented in LMP2 class by Roberto González, Pastor Maldonado, Nathanaël Berthon and Anthony Davidson, who replaced Berthon after the 2018 24 Hours of Le Mans.

The BR1 Engineering BR-1-Gibson of DragonSpeed was retired after the 2018/2019 World Endurance Championship season.

DragonSpeed returned to the FIA World Endurance Championship in the 2021 season in the LMP2 class. While fielding the Oreca 07, with a lineup of regular drivers for the team, Hedman, Hanley and Montoya, the team brought back a victory in 24h Le Mans 2021 in the LMP2 Pro/Am subclass. With three other podiums and that victory, the #21 finished third in the standings of LMP2 Pro/Am. By 2022, the team's focus shifted to IMSA and ELMS.

=== IndyCar ===
On December 17, 2018, DragonSpeed announced they would join the IndyCar Series in 2019 on a 5-race schedule, including the 103rd Indianapolis 500. The team's No. 81 entry was powered by Chevrolet and driven by Ben Hanley. In their first race, the 2019 Firestone Grand Prix of St. Petersburg, Hanley advanced to the second round of qualifying and qualified 12th, and then finished 18th, 2 laps down, in his IndyCar race debut. The team finished 21st at the 2019 Honda Indy Grand Prix of Alabama. In qualifying for their third IndyCar race at the 103rd Indianapolis 500, the No. 81 struggled for speed early on in the day but finished 27th fastest, confirming DragonSpeed's spot in the field. Hanley would proceed to finish 32nd in the race after a mechanical issue took the team out early. The team was scheduled to participate in 2 further races at Road America and Mid-Ohio, but visa issues prevented the team from getting on track and their inaugural campaign was reduced to 3 races.

In August 2019 team owner Elton Julian stated the team planned on entering ten races in 2020 with Hanley as the driver, with the possibility of additional races. Julian said different drivers could be used if the team were to go beyond the planned ten races, if the right combination of sponsorship and driver talent could be found. In December, an announcement from the team said they had finalized plans to run six races in 2020 - St. Petersburg, Long Beach, Texas, Mid-Ohio, Laguna Seca and the Indy 500, however the COVID-19 pandemic led to the cancellation of the St. Petersburg, Long Beach, Mid-Ohio and Laguna Seca races, and the team did not field an entry for Texas. On August 8, the team announced that Hanley would drive their entry for the Indianapolis 500, which was held on August 23. With little preparation time, the team had numerous mechanical issues in practice, resulting in qualifying in the 33rd and last position. The car finished the race in 23rd place.

On October 28, 2020, the team shuttered their IndyCar Series program and sold their IndyCar assets to Meyer Shank Racing, citing the team "being taken back two years" due to the COVID-19 pandemic. Julian left open the possibility of returning to the series when "the next big thing happens for IndyCar" if the resources were available. DragonSpeed returned to IndyCar for the 2022 Indianapolis 500, fielding a joint entry with Cusick Motorsports for driver Stefan Wilson. DragonSpeed leased a chassis from A. J. Foyt Enterprises for the entry.

=== IMSA WeatherTech Championship ===
DragonSpeed became a proper competitor in IMSA around 2019, but they have done IMSA racing in the past, with a few one off entries for Daytona and Sebring. The Sebring attempt, held in 2016, got the team a finish of fourth, and Daytona in 2017 with the prototype at the tenth place, although the car didn't finish the race.

The first successes came in 2019, with DragonSpeed entering two cars at Daytona, with one of them succeeding to win the LMP2 class. In 2020, DragonSpeed won again, but with the entry which lost out on the victory the previous year. With a victory in 2022, the team collected three LMP2 wins at Daytona in four years.

The switch to IMSA came in 2022, with the lineup for Daytona and the rest of the season changing. Hedman and Montoya placed 4th in the driver standings, with the #81 placing fifth in the team standings with Daytona counted in.

DragonSpeed focused on ELMS in 2023, to return to IMSA in 2024. The team decided on a varying crew of drivers, with Allen, Alvarez, Lux and Simpson racing in Daytona, Hedman, Jakobsen and Lindh at Sebring, with Varrone joining previously mentioned Lux and Lindh at Watkins Glen.

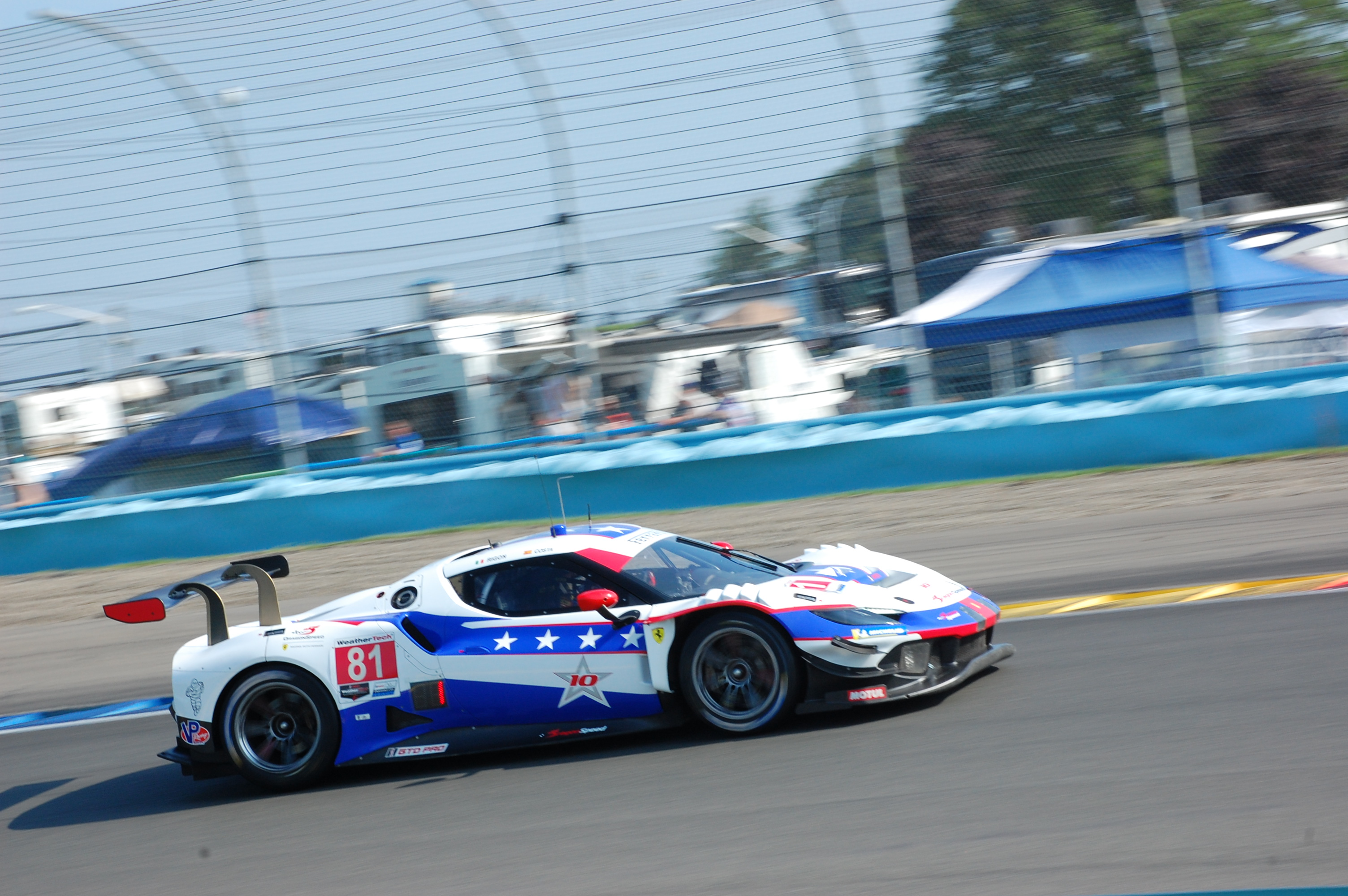
A DragonSpeed Ferrari 296 GT3 car in 2025

Move into GTD/GTD Pro

Later in the season, DragonSpeed decided to switch to GT competition, entering the last two races of the 2024 season in a Ferrari 296 GT3. Team stalwart Hedman, Lindh and Vilander raced at the Indianapolis round in the GTD class. For the season finale at Road Atlanta, the team welcomed Thomas Neubauer and Vincent Abril to join Vilander for the first race of DragonSpeed in the GTD PRO class.

2025 : Championship contender

2025 marked a breakthrough year for DragonSpeed, as the team committed to a full-season effort in the GTD PRO category with their No. 81 Ferrari 296 GT3. Julian's team came into a collaboration with Risi Competizione, which granted the American based squad help with running the car. DragonSpeed assembled a lineup headed by Albert Costa for the full season, Giacomo Altoè for sprint-race events and Petit Le Mans, as well as Ferrari factory driver Davide Rigon for endurance rounds.

Throughout the season, DragonSpeed emerged as a genuine contender for the GTD PRO title, even though their resources were smaller than their rivals, with almost no testing performed. The team regularly qualified at the front, including four pole positions, and scored strong results like Top 5 finishes, with 6 podiums including one win at Mosport against factory-backed entries.

DragonSpeed’s campaign included battling the championship fight all the way to the final races, with Albert Costa and co-drivers running second in the GTD PRO championship standings behind the Corvette Racing pair of Antonio Garcia and Alexander Sims. They came just short in the final race, which cost them the championship.

Change of Direction for 2026

Following the 2025 season, where DragonSpeed finished second in the GTD PRO class, the team changed both his car manufacturer and class for 2026. They transitioned from Ferrari to a Corvette Z06 GT3.R, partnering with General Motors to enter the GTD class. This entry makes them eligible to compete for the Bob Akin award, which provides an invitation to the 24 Hours of Le Mans.

DragonSpeed campaigned its #81 Corvette Z06 GT3.R at the 2026 Rolex 24 Hours at Daytona, with full-season drivers Henrik Hedman and Giacomo Altoè joined by Casper Stevenson for the Michelin Endurance Cup rounds and Matteo Cairoli for the 24 hours of Daytona. The first two races didn't exactly go the team's way, with both rounds going awry after incidents.

On July 10th, Sportscar365 reported that Henrik Hedman sustained an undisclosed injury during a high-speed crash in the Twelve hours of Sebring 2026. This translated into him withdrawing from the remainder of the season. Elton Julian, team owner, has confirmed that after Road America, the car will be filled with a paying client, while retaining current drivers Altoè and Stevenson. Stevenson filled in for Hedman at the Canadian Tyre Motorsport Park race.

Before the round at ViR, DragonSpeed confirmed their exit from the IMSA Weathertech Sportscar Championship after the conclusion of the 2026 season. Julian blamed their exit on rising costs, lack of sponsoring and long weekends. Alec Udell replaced Henrik Hedman in Road America, and continued to do so in the Indianapolis round. Sebastien Bourdais stood in for Hedman in Road Atlanta, as well as the team moved their entry to the GTD PRO class for their last race.

DragonSpeed was supposed to appear in the final IGTC/GT World Challenge America round in the Indianapolis eight hour race with a Corvette Z06 GT3.R in the Pro class, with Alexander Sims, Ben Green and Casper Stevenson, but withdrawn a week before the event due to "imperfect conditions".

=== Ferrari Challenge North America ===
Following the conclusion of IMSA WeatherTech Sportscar Championship in 2026, the team has confirmed to switch to one-marque GT racing, running a programme in Ferrari Challenge North America. Only confirmed driver at this stage is William Hedman, son of team stalwart Henrik, whose racing plans with the team have been mentioned in media since 2026.

== Racing results ==
=== 24 Hours of Le Mans ===
| Year | Entrant | No. | Car | Drivers | Class | Laps | Pos. | Class Pos. |
|---|---|---|---|---|---|---|---|---|
| 2017 | (United States) DragonSpeed – 10 Star | 21 | Oreca 07-Gibson | (United Kingdom) Ben Hanley (Sweden) Henrik Hedman (Sweden) Felix Rosenqvist | LMP2 | 343 | 14th | 12th |
| 2017 | (Russia) G-Drive Racing | 22 | Oreca 07-Gibson | (Mexico) José Gutiérrez (Japan) Ryō Hirakawa (Mexico) Memo Rojas | LMP2 | 327 | 39th | 17th |
| 2018 | (United States) DragonSpeed | 10 | BR Engineering BR1-Gibson | (United Kingdom) Ben Hanley (Sweden) Henrik Hedman (Netherlands) Renger van der Zande | LMP1 | 244 | DNF | DNF |
| 2018 | (United States) DragonSpeed | 31 | Oreca 07-Gibson | (France) Nathanaël Berthon (Mexico) Roberto González (Venezuela) Pastor Maldonado | LMP2 | 360 | 9th | 5th |
| 2019 | (United States) DragonSpeed | 10 | BR Engineering BR1-Gibson | (United Kingdom) Ben Hanley (Sweden) Henrik Hedman (Netherlands) Renger van der Zande | LMP1 | 76 | DNF | DNF |
| 2019 | (United States) DragonSpeed | 31 | Oreca 07-Gibson | (United Kingdom) Anthony Davidson (Mexico) Roberto González (Venezuela) Pastor Maldonado | LMP2 | 245 | DNF | DNF |
| 2020 | (United States) DragonSpeed USA | 21 | Oreca 07-Gibson | (France) Timothé Buret (Colombia) Juan Pablo Montoya (Mexico) Memo Rojas | LMP2 | 192 | DNF | DNF |
| 2020 | (United States) DragonSpeed USA | 27 | Oreca 07-Gibson | (United Kingdom) Ben Hanley (Sweden) Henrik Hedman (Netherlands) Renger van der Zande | LMP2 | 361 | 16th | 12th |
| 2021 | (United States) DragonSpeed USA | 21 | Oreca 07-Gibson | (United Kingdom) Ben Hanley (Sweden) Henrik Hedman (Colombia) Juan Pablo Montoya | LMP2 (Pro-Am) | 356 | 15th | 1st |

=== IndyCar Series ===
(key)

| Year | Chassis | Engine | Drivers | No. | 1 | 2 | 3 | 4 | 5 | 6 | 7 | 8 | 9 | 10 | 11 | 12 | 13 | 14 | 15 | 16 | 17 | Pos. | Pts. |
|---|---|---|---|---|---|---|---|---|---|---|---|---|---|---|---|---|---|---|---|---|---|---|---|
| 2019 | | | | | STP | COA | ALA | LBH | IMS | INDY | DET | | TEX | ROA | TOR | IOW | MDO | POC | GAT | POR | LAG | | |
| 2019 | Dallara DW12 | Chevrolet IndyCar V6 t | (United Kingdom) Ben Hanley (R) | 81 | 18 | | 21 | | | 32 | | | | | | | | | | | | 30th | 31 |
| 2020 | | | | | TEX | IMS | ROA | ROA | IOW | IOW | INDY | GTW | GTW | MDO | MDO | IMS | IMS | STP | | | | | |
| 2020 | Dallara DW12 | Chevrolet IndyCar V6 t | (United Kingdom) Ben Hanley R | 81 | | | | | | | 23 | | | | | | | | | | | 33rd | 14 |
| 2022 | | | | | STP | TXS | LBH | ALA | IGP | INDY | DET | ROA | MDO | TOR | IOW | IOW | IGP | NSH | GAT | POR | LAG | | |
| 2022 | Dallara DW12 | Chevrolet IndyCar V6 t | (United Kingdom) Stefan Wilson^{1} R | 25 | | | | | | 26 | | | | | | | | | | | | 35th | 10 |

* Season still in progress

^{1} In conjunction with Cusick Motorsports
