= 2021 6 Hours of The Glen =

Fifth round of the 2021 IMSA SportsCar Championship season

Track map of Watkins Glen International

The 2021 Sahlen's Six Hours of The Glen was an endurance sports car race sanctioned by the International Motor Sports Association (IMSA). The race was held at Watkins Glen International in Watkins Glen, New York on June 27, 2021. This race was the fifth round of the 2021 IMSA SportsCar Championship, and the third round of the 2021 Michelin Endurance Cup.

== Background ==
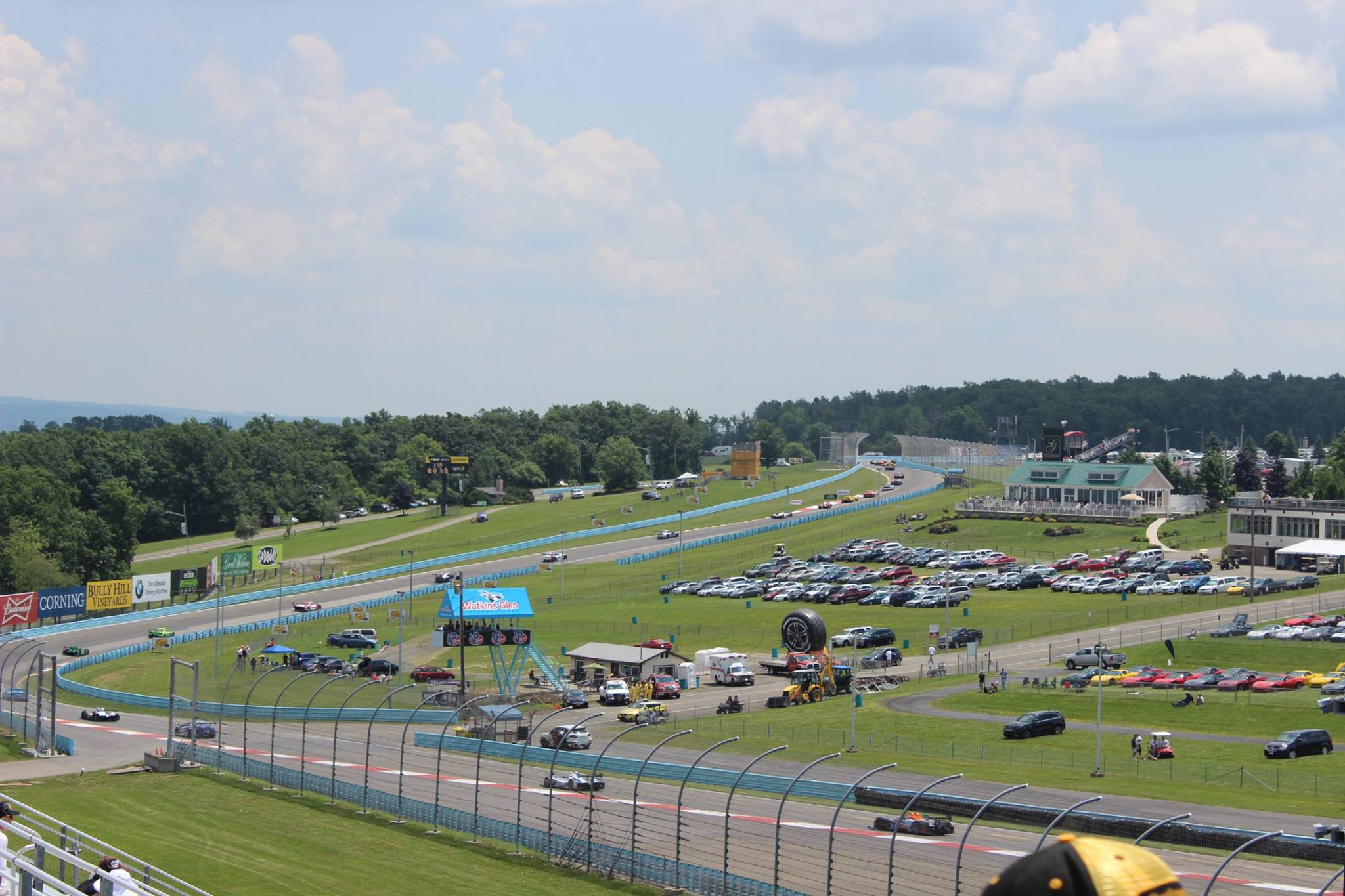
Watkins Glen International, where the race was held.

International Motor Sports Association's (IMSA) president John Doonan confirmed the race was part of the schedule for the 2021 IMSA SportsCar Championship (IMSA SCC) in September 2020. It was the seventh year the event was held as part of the WeatherTech SportsCar Championship. The 2021 Sahlen's Six Hours of The Glen was the fifth of twelve scheduled sports car races of 2021 by IMSA, and it was the third of four races of the Michelin Endurance Cup (MEC). The race was held at the eleven-turn 3.450 mi (5.552 km) Watkins Glen International in Watkins Glen, New York on June 27, 2021. The race marked IMSA's return to Watkins Glen after the previous year's edition of the event was canceled as a result of the COVID-19 pandemic. With the cancellation of the scheduled event at Canadian Tire Motorsport Park prompting the running of the WeatherTech 240, the six hour race became the first of two races in as many weeks at the track.

On June 18, 2021, IMSA released the latest technical bulletin outlining Balance of Performance for the event. In DPi, The Acura and Cadillac received slight fuel capacity reductions at one and two liters respectively, while the Mazda featured a 3.6 kW horsepower increase. The two GT classes saw minor adjustments, with the GTLM-class Porsche receiving a 10 kg weight reduction, while the Aston Martin received a 7.1 kW horsepower decrease and a two-liter fuel capacity decrease after winning the previous round at Belle Isle.

Before the race Filipe Albuquerque and Ricky Taylor led the DPi Drivers' Championship with 1398 points, ahead of Oliver Jarvis and Harry Tincknell with 1327 points, and Pipo Derani and Felipe Nasr with 1270 points. In LMP2, Scott Huffaker, Mikkel Jensen, and Ben Keating led the Drivers' Championship with 382 points, 32 points ahead of Ryan Dalziel, Dwight Merriman, and Kyle Tilley. With 715 points, Gar Robinson led the LMP3 Drivers' Championship, 25 points ahead of Jon Bennett and Colin Braun. Nicky Catsburg, Antonio García, and Jordan Taylor led the GTLM Drivers' Championship with 697 points, 41 points ahead of Cooper MacNeil followed by John Edwards, Augusto Farfus, and Jesse Krohn in third. With 920 points, the GTD Drivers' Championship was led by Bill Auberlen and Robby Foley, ahead of Roman De Angelis and Ross Gunn. Cadillac, Chevrolet, and BMW were leading their respective Manufacturers' Championships, while WTR-Konica Minolta Acura, PR1/Mathiasen Motorsports, Riley Motorsports, Corvette Racing, and Turner Motorsport each led their own Teams' Championships.

=== Entries ===
A total of 38 cars took part in the event, split across five classes. 7 cars were entered in DPi, 5 in LMP2, 7 in LMP3, 5 in GTLM, and 14 in GTD. The pre-event entry list contained 40 entries, but both Sean Creech Motorsport and Forty7 Motorsports withdrew their LMP3 entries before the start of the weekend.

DPi featured the expected addition of the Ally Cadillac Racing #48 alongside the six full-season entries in the class. Four of the seven teams also elected to add a third driver to their lineups. In LMP2, United Autosports returned as part of their Michelin Endurance Cup schedule, while James French joined Tower Motorsport By Starworks for the first time in 2021. LMP3 featured a series of additions, including Marco Andretti's addition to the Andretti Autosport entry, United Autosports' IMSA LMP3 debut, and the long-awaited first IMSA SportsCar Championship appearance for Dawson Racing. GTLM saw the return of WeatherTech Racing after they missed the previous round at Detroit, while BMW Team RLL returned as part of their Endurance Cup campaign. In GTD, CarBahn with Peregrine Racing added another event to their Sprint Cup schedule, and NTE Sport returned after most recently appearing at Daytona in January. Wright Motorsports also announced prior to the event that Trent Hindman would replace Ryan Hardwick as Patrick Long's co-driver for the remainder of the season.

== Practice ==
There were two practice sessions preceding the start of the race on Sunday, one on Friday and one on Saturday. The first session lasted one hour on Friday while the second session lasted 75 minutes on Saturday.

=== Practice 1 ===
The first practice session took place at 4:20 pm ET on Friday and ended with Oliver Pla topping the charts for Meyer Shank Racing with Curb-Agajanian, with a lap time of 1:31.056, ahead of the No. 31 Cadillac of Mike Conway. Tristan Nunez was fastest in LMP2 with a time of 1:33.836. Oliver Askew set the fastest time in LMP3. The GTLM class was topped by the No. 4 Corvette Racing Chevrolet Corvette C8.R of Nick Tandy with a time of 1:42.517. Antonio García in the sister No. 3 Corvette Racing entry was second fastest and Jesse Krohn rounded out the top three. Jack Hawksworth was fastest in GTD. The session was red flagged twice. 7 minutes into the session, Kyle Tilley in the No. 18 Era Motorsports Oreca crashed at turn one after making contact with the No. 48 Ally Cadillac Racing Cadillac DPi-V.R of Simon Pagenaud. The final stoppage came when Matt Campbell's No. 79 WeatherTech Racing Porsche 911 RSR-19 suffered suspension damage after going airborne at the Inner Loop causing debris to be scattered onto the track.

Pos.	Class	No.	Team	Driver	Time	Gap
1	DPi	60	Meyer Shank Racing with Curb-Agajanian	Oliver Pla	1:31.056	_
2	DPi	31	Whelen Engineering Racing	Mike Conway	1:31.647	+0.591
3	DPi	01	Cadillac Chip Ganassi Racing	Renger van der Zande	1:31.949	+0.893

=== Practice 2 ===
The second and final practice session took place at 8:00 am ET on Saturday and ended with Dane Cameron topping the charts for Meyer Shank Racing with Curb-Agajanian, with a lap time of 1:30.451. Ricky Taylor's No. 10 Acura was second fastest followed by Pipo Derani in the No. 31 Cadillac. Mikkel Jensen set the fastest time in LMP2. Felipe Fraga was fastest in LMP3 with a time of 1:39.937. The GTLM class topped by the No. 25 BMW Team RLL BMW M8 GTE of Connor De Phillippi with a time of 1:41.977. Antonio García in the No. 3 Corvette Racing entry was second fastest and John Edwards rounded out the top three. Kyle Kirkwood was fastest in GTD. The session saw one stoppage when Steven Thomas locked the No. 11 WIN Autosport Oreca 07's brakes at turn eight and hit the wall before collecting Zacharie Robichon's No. 9 Porsche.

Pos.	Class	No.	Team	Driver	Time	Gap
1	DPi	60	Meyer Shank Racing with Curb-Agajanian	Dane Cameron	1:30.451	_
2	DPi	10	WTR-Konica Minolta Acura	Ricky Taylor	1:30.682	+0.231
3	DPi	31	Whelen Engineering Racing	Pipo Derani	1:30.893	+0.442

== Qualifying ==
Qualifying was broken into four sessions. The first was for cars in GTD class. Kyle Kirkwood qualified on pole for the class driving the No. 14 car for Vasser Sullivan Racing, beating Trent Hindman in the No. 16 Porsche by more than three-tenths of a second. Jaden Conwright in the No. 42 NTE Sport Audi was third followed by the No. 28 Mercedes-AMG of Daniel Morad, and The No. 96 Turner Motorsport BMW of Robby Foley rounded out the top five.

The second session was for cars in the GTLM and GTD classes. Antonio García qualified on pole in GTLM driving the No. 3 car for Corvette Racing, besting teammate Tommy Milner in the sister No. 4 Corvette Racing entry. Connor De Phillippi's No. 25 BMW was third, with the sister No. 24 car of John Edwards fourth. MacNeil rounded out the GTLM qualifiers. Jack Hawksworth set the fastest time in the GTD points paying session driving the No. 14 car for Vasser Sullivan Racing and earned 35 championship points. Hawksworth was 0.282 seconds clear of teammate Zach Veach in the sister No. 12 Vasser Sullivan Racing entry. Patrick Long was third in the No. 16 Wright Motorsports Porsche followed by Richard Heistand in the No. 39 Audi.

The third session was for cars in the LMP3 class. Austin McCusker qualified on pole for the class driving the No. 2 car for United Autosports. McCusker was 0.570 second clear of Jarett Andretti in the No. 36 Andretti Autosport Ligier. Following in third was George Kurtz's No. 54 Ligier while The No. 38 Performance Tech Motorsports Ligier JS P320 of Dan Goldburg was fourth.

The final session of qualifying was for cars in the DPi and LMP2 classes. Ricky Taylor took overall pole for the event driving the No. 10 car for WTR-Konica Minolta Acura, beating Dane Cameron in the No. 60 Meyer Shank Racing Acura by 0.119 seconds. Renger van der Zande's No. 01 Cadillac was third by Kamui Kobayashi in the No. 48 Ally Cadillac Racing, and Pipo Derani's No. 31 Cadillac rounded out the top five. Steven Thomas qualified on pole in LMP2 driving the No. 11 car for WIN Autosport, besting Ben Keating in the No. 52 PR1/Mathiasen Motorsports entry.

=== Qualifying results ===
Pole positions in each class are indicated in bold and by ‡.

Pos.	Class	No.	Team	Driver	Time	Gap	Grid
1	**DPi**	**10**	**(United States) WTR-Konica Minolta Acura**	**(United States) Ricky Taylor**	**1:30.022**	**_**	1‡
2	DPi	60	(United States) Meyer Shank Racing w/ Curb-Agajanian	(United States) Dane Cameron	1:30.141	+0.119	2
3	DPi	01	(United States) Cadillac Chip Ganassi Racing	(Netherlands) Renger van der Zande	1:30.637	+0.615	3
4	DPi	48	(United States) Ally Cadillac Racing	(Japan) Kamui Kobayashi	1:30.671	+0.649	4
5	DPi	31	(United States) Whelen Engineering Racing	(Brazil) Pipo Derani	1:30.824	+0.802	5
6	DPi	55	(Canada) Mazda Motorsports	(United Kingdom) Oliver Jarvis	1:31.075	+1.053	7^{1}
7	DPi	5	(United States) JDC-Mustang Sampling Racing	(France) Tristan Vautier	1:31.324	+1.302	6
8	**LMP2**	**11**	**(United States) WIN Autosport**	**(United States) Steven Thomas**	**1:35.304**	**+5.282**	8‡
9	LMP2	52	(United States) PR1/Mathiasen Motorsports	(United States) Ben Keating	1:35.322	+5.300	12^{2}
10	LMP2	18	(United States) Era Motorsport	(United States) Dwight Merriman	1:38.455	+8.433	9
11	LMP2	8	(United States) Tower Motorsport By Starworks	(Canada) John Farano	1:38.481	+8.459	10
12	LMP2	22	(United Kingdom) United Autosports	(United States) James McGuire	1:39.510	+9.488	11
13	**LMP3**	**2**	**(United Kingdom) United Autosports**	**(United States) Austin McCusker**	**1:40.404**	**+10.382**	13‡
14	**GTLM**	**3**	**(United States) Corvette Racing**	**(Spain) Antonio García**	**1:40.944**	**+10.922**	20‡
15	LMP3	36	(United States) Andretti Autosport	(United States) Jarett Andretti	1:40.974	+10.952	14
16	GTLM	4	(United States) Corvette Racing	(United States) Tommy Milner	1:41.318	+11.296	21
17	GTLM	25	(United States) BMW Team RLL	(United States) Connor De Phillippi	1:41.357	+11.335	22
18	LMP3	54	(United States) CORE Autosport	(United States) George Kurtz	1:41.501	+11.479	15
19	LMP3	38	(United States) Performance Tech Motorsports	(United States) Dan Goldburg	1:41.798	+11.776	16
20	GTLM	24	(United States) BMW Team RLL	(United States) John Edwards	1:41.932	+11.910	23
21	LMP3	84	(United Kingdom) D3+ Transformers-Dawson Racing	(Norway) Theodor Olsen	1:42.256	+12.234	17
22	GTLM	79	(United States) WeatherTech Racing	(United States) Cooper MacNeil	1:42.363	+12.341	24
23	LMP3	74	(United States) Riley Motorsports	(United States) Gar Robinson	1:43.100	+13.078	18
24	LMP3	91	(United States) Riley Motorsports	(United States) Jim Cox	1:43.263	+13.241	19
25	**GTD**	**14**	**(United States) Vasser Sullivan Racing**	**(United States) Kyle Kirkwood**	**1:45.539**	**+15.517**	25‡
26	GTD	16	(United States) Wright Motorsports	(United States) Trent Hindman	1:45.849	+15.827	26
27	GTD	42	(United States) NTE Sport	(United States) Jaden Conwright	1:45.853	+15.831	27
28	GTD	28	(United States) Alegra Motorsports	(Canada) Daniel Morad	1:45.997	+15.975	28
29	GTD	96	(United States) Turner Motorsport	(United States) Robby Foley	1:46.051	+16.029	29
30	GTD	12	(United States) Vasser Sullivan Racing	(United States) Frankie Montecalvo	1:46.265	+16.243	30
31	GTD	39	(United States) CarBahn Motorsports with Peregrine Racing	(United States) Tyler McQuarrie	1:46.294	+16.272	31
32	GTD	1	(United States) Paul Miller Racing	(United States) Corey Lewis	1:46.512	+16.490	37^{3}
33	GTD	9	(Canada) Pfaff Motorsports	(Canada) Zacharie Robichon	1:46.550	+16.528	32
34	GTD	19	(Austria) GRT Grasser Racing Team	(Canada) Misha Goikhberg	1:47.070	+17.048	33
35	GTD	75	(Australia) SunEnergy1 Racing	(Canada) Mikaël Grenier	1:47.087	+17.065	34
36	GTD	23	(United States) Heart Of Racing Team	(United Kingdom) Ian James	1:47.500	+17.478	38^{4}
37	GTD	88	(United States) Team Hardpoint EBM	(United States) Rob Ferriol	1:48.563	+18.541	35
38	GTD	44	(United States) Magnus Racing with Archangel Motorsports	(United States) John Potter	1:48.909	+18.887	36
Sources:

- ^{1} The No. 55 Mazda Motorsports entry initially qualified sixth for the DPi class. However, the team changed engines after qualifying. By IMSA rules, the entry was moved to the rear of the DPi field on the starting grid.
- ^{2} The No. 52 PR1/Mathiasen Motorsports entry was moved to the back of the LMP2 field as per Article 40.1.4 of the Sporting regulations (Change of starting tires).
- ^{3} The No. 1 Paul Miller Racing initially qualified eighth for the GTD class. However, the team changed engines after qualifying. By IMSA rules, the entry was moved to the rear of the GTD field on the starting grid.
- ^{4} The No. 75 SunEnergy1 Racing entry was moved to the back of the GTD field as per Article 43.5 of the Sporting regulations (Change of starting driver).

== Post-race ==
Cameron and Pla advanced from sixth to fourth in the DPi Drivers' Championship. Magnussen and van der Zande dropped fourth to fifth. As a result of winning the race, Merrill, Nunez, and Thomas advanced from fourth to second in the LMP2 Drivers' Championship. With a total of 1090 points, Robinson's victory allowed him to increase his advantage over Bennett and Braun in the LMP3 Drivers' Standings. By finishing third place, De Phillippi, Eng, and Spengler advanced from fifth to third in the GTLM Drivers' Championship. Edwards, Farfus, and Krohn jumped from third to second while MacNeil dropped from second to fifth. With a total of 1296 points, Auberlen and Foley's victory allowed them to increase their advantage over De Angelis and Gunn in the GTD Drivers' Championship. Sellers and Snow advanced from fifth to third while Long dropped from third to fifth. Cadillac, Chevrolet, and BMW continued to top their respective Manufacturers' Championships while WTR-Konica Minolta Acura, PR1/Mathiasen Motorsports, Riley Motorsports, Corvette Racing, and Turner Motorsport kept their respective advantages in their respective Teams' Championships with seven rounds remaining in the season.

=== Race results ===
Class winners are denoted in bold and ‡.

Pos	Class	No.	Team	Drivers	Chassis	Laps	Time/Retired
Pos	Class	No.	Team	Drivers	Engine	Laps	Time/Retired
1	**DPi**	**55**	**(Canada) Mazda Motorsports**	**(United Kingdom) Oliver Jarvis (United Kingdom) Harry Tincknell (United States) Jonathan Bomarito**	**Mazda RT24-P**	**200**	**6:00:04.522‡**
1	**DPi**	**55**	**(Canada) Mazda Motorsports**	**(United Kingdom) Oliver Jarvis (United Kingdom) Harry Tincknell (United States) Jonathan Bomarito**	**Mazda MZ-2.0T 2.0L Turbo I4**	**200**	**6:00:04.522‡**
2	DPi	60	(United States) Meyer Shank Racing with Curb-Agajanian	(United States) Dane Cameron (France) Olivier Pla	Acura ARX-05	200	+0.965
2	DPi	60	(United States) Meyer Shank Racing with Curb-Agajanian	(United States) Dane Cameron (France) Olivier Pla	Acura AR35TT 3.5L Turbo V6	200	+0.965
3	DPi	10	(United States) Konica Minolta Acura	(United States) Ricky Taylor (Portugal) Filipe Albuquerque (United States) Alexander Rossi	Acura ARX-05	200	+9.392
3	DPi	10	(United States) Konica Minolta Acura	(United States) Ricky Taylor (Portugal) Filipe Albuquerque (United States) Alexander Rossi	Acura AR35TT 3.5L Turbo V6	200	+9.392
4	DPi	31	(United States) Whelen Engineering Racing	(Brazil) Felipe Nasr (United Kingdom) Mike Conway (Brazil) Pipo Derani	Cadillac DPi-V.R	200	+18.268
4	DPi	31	(United States) Whelen Engineering Racing	(Brazil) Felipe Nasr (United Kingdom) Mike Conway (Brazil) Pipo Derani	Cadillac 5.5L V8	200	+18.268
5 (Note: The #48 Ally Cadillac Racing entry received a 35-second time penalty for failing to serve a drive-through penalty. This demoted the entry from fourth to fifth in class.)	DPi	48	(United States) Ally Cadillac Racing	(United States) Jimmie Johnson (Japan) Kamui Kobayashi (France) Simon Pagenaud	Cadillac DPi-V.R	200	+53.216
5	DPi	48	(United States) Ally Cadillac Racing	(United States) Jimmie Johnson (Japan) Kamui Kobayashi (France) Simon Pagenaud	Cadillac 5.5L V8	200	+53.216
6 DNF	DPi	01	(United States) Cadillac Chip Ganassi Racing	(Netherlands) Renger van der Zande (Denmark) Kevin Magnussen	Cadillac DPi-V.R	199	Accident
6 DNF	DPi	01	(United States) Cadillac Chip Ganassi Racing	(Netherlands) Renger van der Zande (Denmark) Kevin Magnussen	Cadillac 5.5L V8	199	Accident
7	DPi	5	(United States) JDC-Mustang Sampling Racing	(France) Tristan Vautier (France) Loïc Duval (France) Sébastien Bourdais	Cadillac DPi-V.R	199	+1 Lap
7	DPi	5	(United States) JDC-Mustang Sampling Racing	(France) Tristan Vautier (France) Loïc Duval (France) Sébastien Bourdais	Cadillac 5.5L V8	199	+1 Lap
8	**LMP2**	**11**	**(United States) WIN Autosport**	**(United States) Steven Thomas (United States) Tristan Nunez (United States) Thomas Merrill**	**Oreca 07**	**196**	**+4 Laps‡**
8	**LMP2**	**11**	**(United States) WIN Autosport**	**(United States) Steven Thomas (United States) Tristan Nunez (United States) Thomas Merrill**	**Gibson 4.2L GK428 V8**	**196**	**+4 Laps‡**
9	LMP2	52	(United States) PR1/Mathiasen Motorsports	(United States) Ben Keating (Denmark) Mikkel Jensen (United States) Scott Huffaker	Oreca 07	196	+4 Laps
9	LMP2	52	(United States) PR1/Mathiasen Motorsports	(United States) Ben Keating (Denmark) Mikkel Jensen (United States) Scott Huffaker	Gibson GK428 4.2L V8	196	+4 Laps
10	LMP2	22	(United Kingdom) United Autosports	(United States) James McGuire (United Kingdom) Wayne Boyd (United Kingdom) Guy Smith	Oreca 07	193	+7 Laps
10	LMP2	22	(United Kingdom) United Autosports	(United States) James McGuire (United Kingdom) Wayne Boyd (United Kingdom) Guy Smith	Gibson GK428 4.2L V8	193	+7 Laps
11	**GTLM**	**3**	**(United States) Corvette Racing**	**(Spain) Antonio García (United States) Jordan Taylor**	**Chevrolet Corvette C8.R**	**187**	**+13 Laps‡**
11	**GTLM**	**3**	**(United States) Corvette Racing**	**(Spain) Antonio García (United States) Jordan Taylor**	**Chevrolet 5.5L V8**	**187**	**+13 Laps‡**
12	GTLM	24	(United States) BMW Team RLL	(United States) John Edwards (Finland) Jesse Krohn (Brazil) Augusto Farfus	BMW M8 GTE	187	+13 Laps
12	GTLM	24	(United States) BMW Team RLL	(United States) John Edwards (Finland) Jesse Krohn (Brazil) Augusto Farfus	BMW S63 4.0L Turbo V8	187	+13 Laps
13	GTLM	25	(United States) BMW Team RLL	(United States) Connor De Phillippi (Austria) Philipp Eng (Canada) Bruno Spengler	BMW M8 GTE	187	+13 Laps
13	GTLM	25	(United States) BMW Team RLL	(United States) Connor De Phillippi (Austria) Philipp Eng (Canada) Bruno Spengler	BMW S63 4.0L Turbo V8	187	+13 Laps
14	GTLM	4	(United States) Corvette Racing	(United States) Tommy Milner (United Kingdom) Nick Tandy	Chevrolet Corvette C8.R	187	+13 Laps
14	GTLM	4	(United States) Corvette Racing	(United States) Tommy Milner (United Kingdom) Nick Tandy	Chevrolet 5.5L V8	187	+13 Laps
15	**LMP3**	**74**	**(United States) Riley Motorsports**	**(United States) Gar Robinson (Brazil) Felipe Fraga (Australia) Scott Andrews**	**Ligier JS P320**	**186**	**+14 Laps‡**
15	**LMP3**	**74**	**(United States) Riley Motorsports**	**(United States) Gar Robinson (Brazil) Felipe Fraga (Australia) Scott Andrews**	**Nissan VK56DE 5.6L V8**	**186**	**+14 Laps‡**
16	LMP3	54	(United States) CORE Autosport	(United States) Jon Bennett (United States) George Kurtz (United States) Colin Braun	Ligier JS P320	186	+14 Laps
16	LMP3	54	(United States) CORE Autosport	(United States) Jon Bennett (United States) George Kurtz (United States) Colin Braun	Nissan VK56DE 5.6L V8	186	+14 Laps
17	LMP3	91	(United States) Riley Motorsports	(United States) Jim Cox (United States) Dylan Murry (Netherlands) Jeroen Bleekemolen	Ligier JS P320	186	+14 Laps
17	LMP3	91	(United States) Riley Motorsports	(United States) Jim Cox (United States) Dylan Murry (Netherlands) Jeroen Bleekemolen	Nissan VK56DE 5.6L V8	186	+14 Laps
18	LMP3	36	(United States) Andretti Autosport	(United States) Jarett Andretti (United States) Oliver Askew (United States) Marco Andretti	Ligier JS P320	185	+15 Laps
18	LMP3	36	(United States) Andretti Autosport	(United States) Jarett Andretti (United States) Oliver Askew (United States) Marco Andretti	Nissan VK56DE 5.6L V8	185	+15 Laps
19	LMP3	2	(United Kingdom) United Autosports	(Germany) Niklas Krütten (France) Edouard Cauhaupé (United States) Austin McCusker	Ligier JS P320	183	+17 Laps
19	LMP3	2	(United Kingdom) United Autosports	(Germany) Niklas Krütten (France) Edouard Cauhaupé (United States) Austin McCusker	Nissan VK56DE 5.6L V8	183	+17 Laps
20	**GTD**	**96**	**(United States) Turner Motorsport**	**(United States) Bill Auberlen (United States) Robby Foley (Australia) Aidan Read**	**BMW M6 GT3**	**179**	**+21 Laps‡**
20	**GTD**	**96**	**(United States) Turner Motorsport**	**(United States) Bill Auberlen (United States) Robby Foley (Australia) Aidan Read**	**BMW 4.4L Turbo V8**	**179**	**+21 Laps‡**
21	GTD	1	(United States) Paul Miller Racing	(United States) Bryan Sellers (United States) Madison Snow (United States) Corey Lewis	Lamborghini Huracán GT3 Evo	179	+21 Laps
21	GTD	1	(United States) Paul Miller Racing	(United States) Bryan Sellers (United States) Madison Snow (United States) Corey Lewis	Lamborghini 5.2L V10	179	+21 Laps
22	GTD	23	(United States) Heart of Racing Team	(Canada) Roman De Angelis (United Kingdom) Ross Gunn (United Kingdom) Ian James	Aston Martin Vantage GT3	179	+21 Laps
22	GTD	23	(United States) Heart of Racing Team	(Canada) Roman De Angelis (United Kingdom) Ross Gunn (United Kingdom) Ian James	Mercedes-Benz M177 4.0 L Turbo V8	179	+21 Laps
23	GTD	42	(United States) NTE Sport	(United States) Don Yount (United States) Jaden Conwright (Finland) Markus Palttala	Audi R8 LMS Evo	179	+21 Laps
23	GTD	42	(United States) NTE Sport	(United States) Don Yount (United States) Jaden Conwright (Finland) Markus Palttala	Audi 5.2L V10	179	+21 Laps
24	GTD	28	(United States) Alegra Motorsports	(Canada) Daniel Morad (United States) Michael de Quesada (United States) Billy Johnson	Mercedes-AMG GT3 Evo	179	+21 Laps
24	GTD	28	(United States) Alegra Motorsports	(Canada) Daniel Morad (United States) Michael de Quesada (United States) Billy Johnson	Mercedes-AMG M159 6.2L V8	179	+21 Laps
25	GTD	14	(United States) Vasser Sullivan Racing	(United States) Aaron Telitz (United Kingdom) Jack Hawksworth (United States) Kyle Kirkwood	Lexus RC F GT3	179	+21 Laps
25	GTD	14	(United States) Vasser Sullivan Racing	(United States) Aaron Telitz (United Kingdom) Jack Hawksworth (United States) Kyle Kirkwood	Lexus 5.0L V8	179	+21 Laps
26	GTD	9	(Canada) Pfaff Motorsports	(Canada) Zacharie Robichon (Belgium) Laurens Vanthoor (Germany) Lars Kern	Porsche 911 GT3 R	179	+21 Laps
26	GTD	9	(Canada) Pfaff Motorsports	(Canada) Zacharie Robichon (Belgium) Laurens Vanthoor (Germany) Lars Kern	Porsche 4.0L Flat-6	179	+21 Laps
27	GTD	16	(United States) Wright Motorsports	(United States) Patrick Long (United States) Trent Hindman (Belgium) Jan Heylen	Porsche 911 GT3 R	179	+21 Laps
27	GTD	16	(United States) Wright Motorsports	(United States) Patrick Long (United States) Trent Hindman (Belgium) Jan Heylen	Porsche 4.0L Flat-6	179	+21 Laps
28	GTD	39	(United States) CarBahn Motorsports with Peregrine Racing	(United States) Richard Heistand (United States) Jeff Westphal (United States) Tyler McQuarrie	Audi R8 LMS Evo	179	+21 Laps
28	GTD	39	(United States) CarBahn Motorsports with Peregrine Racing	(United States) Richard Heistand (United States) Jeff Westphal (United States) Tyler McQuarrie	Audi 5.2L V10	179	+21 Laps
29	GTD	88	(United States) Team Hardpoint EBM	(United States) Andrew Davis (United States) Rob Ferriol (United Kingdom) Katherine Legge	Porsche 911 GT3 R	179	+21 Laps
29	GTD	88	(United States) Team Hardpoint EBM	(United States) Andrew Davis (United States) Rob Ferriol (United Kingdom) Katherine Legge	Porsche 4.0L Flat-6	179	+21 Laps
30	GTD	12	(United States) Vasser Sullivan Racing	(United States) Frankie Montecalvo (United States) Zach Veach (United States) Robert Megennis	Lexus RC F GT3	179	+21 Laps
30	GTD	12	(United States) Vasser Sullivan Racing	(United States) Frankie Montecalvo (United States) Zach Veach (United States) Robert Megennis	Lexus 5.0L V8	179	+21 Laps
31	LMP3	84	(United Kingdom) D3+ Transformers-Dawson Racing	(Norway) Theodor Olsen (United States) Dominic Cicero (United Kingdom) Ben Devlin	Ligier JS P320	178	+22 Laps
31	LMP3	84	(United Kingdom) D3+ Transformers-Dawson Racing	(Norway) Theodor Olsen (United States) Dominic Cicero (United Kingdom) Ben Devlin	Nissan VK56DE 5.6L V8	178	+22 Laps
32	GTD	44	(United States) Magnus Racing with Archangel Motorsports	(United States) John Potter (United States) Andy Lally (United States) Spencer Pumpelly	Acura NSX GT3 Evo	147	+53 Laps
32	GTD	44	(United States) Magnus Racing with Archangel Motorsports	(United States) John Potter (United States) Andy Lally (United States) Spencer Pumpelly	Acura 3.5L Turbo V6	147	+53 Laps
33 DNF	LMP2	8	(United States) Tower Motorsport by Starworks	(United States) James French (Canada) John Farano (France) Gabriel Aubry	Oreca 07	146	Accident
33 DNF	LMP2	8	(United States) Tower Motorsport by Starworks	(United States) James French (Canada) John Farano (France) Gabriel Aubry	Gibson GK428 4.2L V8	146	Accident
34 DNF	LMP2	18	(United States) Era Motorsport	(United States) Dwight Merriman (United Kingdom) Kyle Tilley (United Kingdom) Ryan Dalziel	Oreca 07	85	Electrical
34 DNF	LMP2	18	(United States) Era Motorsport	(United States) Dwight Merriman (United Kingdom) Kyle Tilley (United Kingdom) Ryan Dalziel	Gibson GK428 4.2L V8	85	Electrical
35 DNF	GTD	19	(Austria) GRT Grasser Racing Team	(Canada) Misha Goikhberg (France) Franck Perera (Germany) Tim Zimmermann	Lamborghini Huracán GT3 Evo	73	Accident
35 DNF	GTD	19	(Austria) GRT Grasser Racing Team	(Canada) Misha Goikhberg (France) Franck Perera (Germany) Tim Zimmermann	Lamborghini 5.2L V10	73	Accident
36 DNF	GTD	75	(Australia) SunEnergy1 Racing	(Germany) Maro Engel (Australia) Kenny Habul (Canada) Mikaël Grenier	Mercedes-AMG GT3 Evo	62	Suspension
36 DNF	GTD	75	(Australia) SunEnergy1 Racing	(Germany) Maro Engel (Australia) Kenny Habul (Canada) Mikaël Grenier	Mercedes-AMG M159 6.2L V8	62	Suspension
37 DNF	LMP3	38	(United States) Performance Tech Motorsports	(United States) Dan Goldburg (Guatemala) Mateo Llarena (Sweden) Rasmus Lindh	Ligier JS P320	31	Engine
37 DNF	LMP3	38	(United States) Performance Tech Motorsports	(United States) Dan Goldburg (Guatemala) Mateo Llarena (Sweden) Rasmus Lindh	Nissan VK56DE 5.6L V8	31	Engine
38 DNF	GTLM	79	(United States) WeatherTech Racing	(United States) Cooper MacNeil (France) Mathieu Jaminet (Australia) Matt Campbell	Porsche 911 RSR-19	3	Fire
38 DNF	GTLM	79	(United States) WeatherTech Racing	(United States) Cooper MacNeil (France) Mathieu Jaminet (Australia) Matt Campbell	Porsche 4.2L Flat-6	3	Fire

== Standings after the race ==
DPi Drivers' Championship standings
Pos.	+/–	Driver	Points
1		(Portugal) Filipe Albuquerque (United States) Ricky Taylor	1733
2		(United Kingdom) Oliver Jarvis (United Kingdom) Harry Tincknell	1701
3		(Brazil) Pipo Derani (Brazil) Felipe Nasr	1576
4	2	(United States) Dane Cameron (France) Olivier Pla	1511
5	1	(Denmark) Kevin Magnussen (Netherlands) Renger van der Zande	1499

LMP2 Drivers' Championship standings
Pos.	+/–	Driver	Points
1		(United States) Scott Huffaker (Denmark) Mikkel Jensen (United States) Ben Keating	702
2	2	(United States) Thomas Merrill (United States) Tristan Nunez (United States) Steven Thomas	700
3	1	(United Kingdom) Ryan Dalziel (United States) Dwight Merriman (United Kingdom) Kyle Tilley	640
4	1	(France) Gabriel Aubry (Canada) John Farano	634
5		(United Kingdom) Wayne Boyd (United States) James McGuire (United Kingdom) Guy Smith	614

LMP3 Drivers' Championship standings
Pos.	+/–	Driver	Points
1		(United States) Gar Robinson	1090
2		(United States) Jon Bennett (United States) Colin Braun	1040
3		(United States) Jim Cox (United States) Dylan Murry	970
4	1	(United States) Oliver Askew	620
5	1	(Sweden) Rasmus Lindh (United States) Dan Goldburg	592

GTLM Drivers' Championship standings
Pos.	+/–	Driver	Points
1		(Spain) Antonio García (United States) Jordan Taylor	1082
2	1	(United States) John Edwards (Brazil) Augusto Farfus (Finland) Jesse Krohn	1001
3	2	(United States) Connor De Phillippi (Austria) Philipp Eng (Canada) Bruno Spengler	966
4		(United States) Tommy Milner (United Kingdom) Nick Tandy	959
5	3	(United States) Cooper MacNeil	942

GTD Drivers' Championship standings
Pos.	+/–	Driver	Points
1		(United States) Bill Auberlen (United States) Robby Foley	1296
2		(Canada) Roman De Angelis (United Kingdom) Ross Gunn	1235
3	2	(United States) Madison Snow (United States) Bryan Sellers	1192
4		(Canada) Zacharie Robichon (Belgium) Laurens Vanthoor	1137
5	2	(United States) Patrick Long	1134

- Note: Only the top five positions are included for all sets of standings.

DPi Teams' Championship standings
Pos.	+/–	Team	Points
1		(United States) #10 WTR-Konica Minolta Acura	1733
2		(Canada) #55 Mazda Motorsports	1701
3	1	(United States) #31 Whelen Engineering Racing	1576
4	2	(United States) #60 Meyer Shank Racing w/ Curb-Agajanian	1511
5	1	(United States) #01 Cadillac Chip Ganassi Racing	1499

LMP2 Teams' Championship standings
Pos.	+/–	Team	Points
1		(United States) #52 PR1 Mathiasen Motorsports	702
2	2	(United States) #11 WIN Autosport	700
3	1	(United States) #18 Era Motorsport	640
4	1	(United States) #8 Tower Motorsport	634
5		(United States) #22 United Autosports	614

LMP3 Teams' Championship standings
Pos.	+/–	Team	Points
1		(United States) #74 Riley Motorsports	1090
2		(United States) #54 CORE Autosport	1040
3		(United States) #91 Riley Motorsports	970
4		(United States) #38 Performance Tech Motorsports	888
5	2	(United States) #36 Andretti Autosport	592

GTLM Teams' Championship standings
Pos.	+/–	Team	Points
1		(United States) #3 Corvette Racing	1082
2	1	(United States) #24 BMW Team RLL	1001
3	2	(United States) #25 BMW Team RLL	966
4		(United States) #4 Corvette Racing	959
5	3	(United States) #79 WeatherTech Racing	942

GTD Teams' Championship standings
Pos.	+/–	Team	Points
1		(United States) #96 Turner Motorsport	1296
2		(United States) #23 Heart of Racing Team	1235
3	2	(United States) #1 Paul Miller Racing	1192
4		(Canada) #9 Pfaff Motorsports	1137
5	2	(United States) #16 Wright Motorsports	1134

- Note: Only the top five positions are included for all sets of standings.

DPi Manufacturers' Championship standings
Pos.	+/–	Manufacturer	Points
1		(United States) Cadillac	1807
2		(Japan) Acura	1799
3		(Japan) Mazda	1729

GTLM Manufacturers' Championship standings
Pos.	+/–	Manufacturer	Points
1		(United States) Chevrolet	1105
2		(Germany) BMW	1052
3		(Germany) Porsche	1022
4		(Italy) Ferrari	330

GTD Manufacturers' Championship standings
Pos.	+/–	Manufacturer	Points
1	1	(Germany) BMW	1341
2	2	(Italy) Lamborghini	1283
3		(United Kingdom) Aston Martin	1281
4	2	(Germany) Porsche	1271
5		(Japan) Lexus	1210

- Note: Only the top five positions are included for all sets of standings.

IMSA SportsCar Championship
Previous race: 2021 Detroit Sports Car Classic	2021 season	Next race: 2021 WeatherTech 240
