= 2021 Road Race Showcase at Road America =

Eighth round of the 2021 IMSA SportsCar Championship Season

Track map of Road America

The 2021 Road Race Showcase at Road America was a sports car race sanctioned by the International Motor Sports Association (IMSA). The Race was held at Road America in Elkhart Lake, Wisconsin on August 8, 2021. The race was the eighth round of the 2021 IMSA SportsCar Championship and the fifth round of the WeatherTech Sprint Cup.

== Background ==
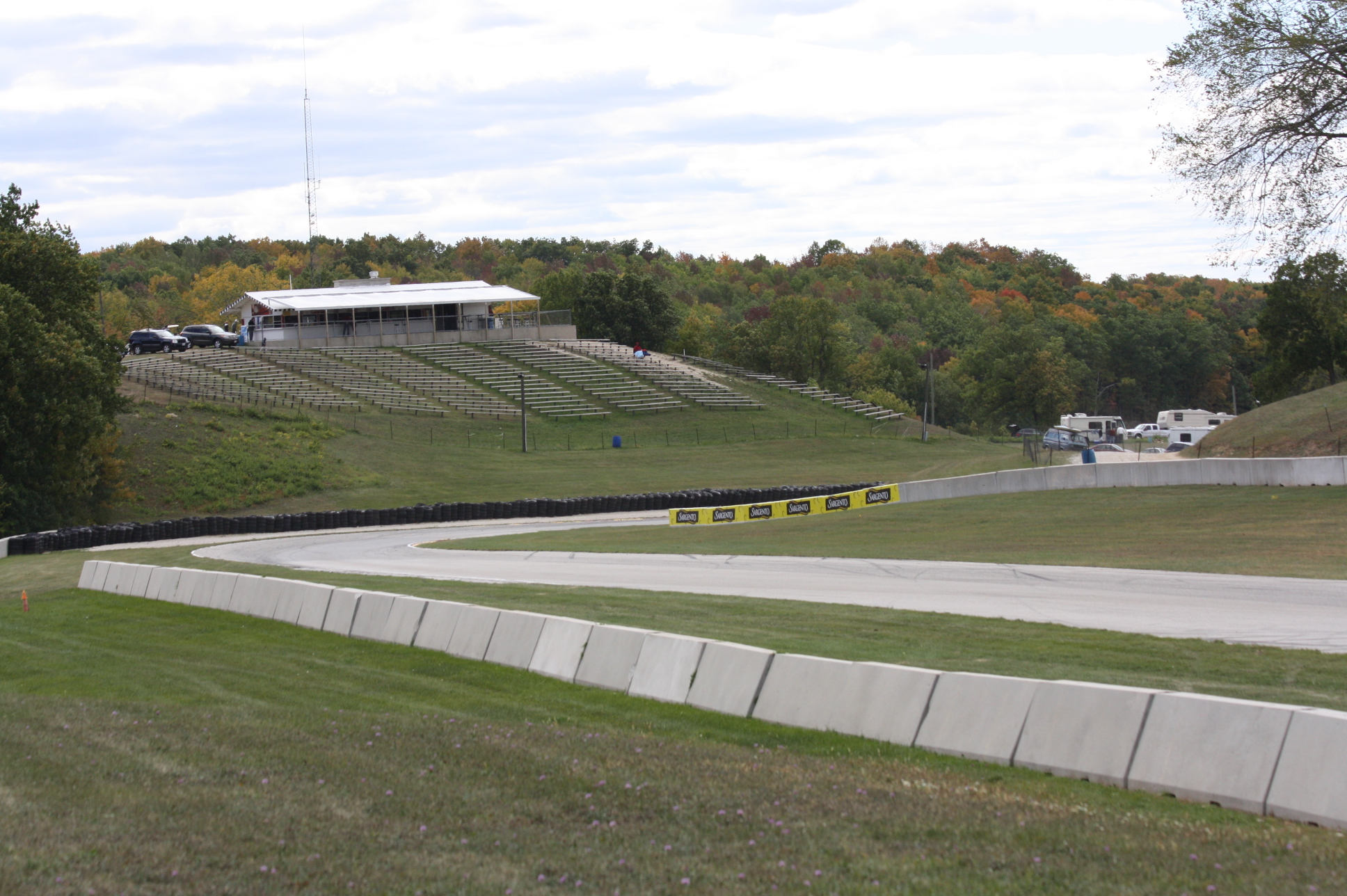
Road America, where the race was held.

International Motor Sports Association's (IMSA) president John Doonan confirmed the race was part of the schedule for the 2021 IMSA SportsCar Championship (IMSA SCC) in September 2020. It was the eighth consecutive year it was part of the IMSA SportsCar Championship. The 2021 Road Race Showcase at Road America was the eighth of twelve scheduled sports car races of 2021 by IMSA, and it was the fifth round held as part of the WeatherTech Sprint Cup. The race was held at the fourteen-turn 4.048 mi (6.515 km) Road America in Elkhart Lake, Wisconsin on August 8, 2021.

During this race weekend, IMSA holds their "State of the Series" annual press conference, in which they confirm and announce their future plans for the series they sanction.

On August 3, 2021, IMSA released the latest technical bulletin outlining Balance of Performance for the event. In DPi, the Mazda RT24-P received a 10 kilogram weight increase. In GTD, the Lexus RC F GT3 received a 10 kilogram weight increase. The Aston Martin Vantage GT3 was given a 6.7 horsepower reduction. The Audi R8 LMS GT3 Evo and BMW M6 GT3 were given fuel capacity reduction of 1 and 2 liters, respectively. No changes were made in GTLM.

Before the race, Filipe Albuquerque and Ricky Taylor led the DPi Drivers' Championship with 2068 points, ahead of Oliver Jarvis and Harry Tincknell in second with 1987 points, and Pipo Derani and Felipe Nasr with 1954 points. In LMP2, Mikkel Jensen and Ben Keating led the Drivers' Championship with 1087 points, ahead of Tristan Nunez and Steven Thomas. With 1468 points, Gar Robinson led the LMP3 Drivers' Championship, 96 points ahead of Jon Bennett and Colin Braun. Antonio García and Jordan Taylor led the GTLM Drivers' Championship with 1852 points, 191 points ahead of Tommy Milner and Nick Tandy followed by Cooper MacNeil in third. With 1606 points, the GTD Drivers' Championship was led by Roman De Angelis and Ross Gunn, ahead of Bill Auberlen and Robby Foley. Cadillac, Chevrolet, and Aston Martin were leading their respective Manufacturers' Championships, while WTR-Konica Minolta Acura, PR1/Mathiasen Motorsports, Riley Motorsports, Corvette Racing, and Heart of Racing Team each led their own Teams' Championships.

=== Entries ===
A total 35 cars took part in the event split across five classes. 6 were entered in DPi, 4 in LMP2, 7 in LMP3, 3 in GTLM, and 15 in GTD. Ryan Dalziel substituted for Kyle Tilley in the Era Motorsport entry due to a clash with the NASCAR Cup Series round at Watkins Glen. Jr III Motorsports and Wulver Motorsports made their IMSA SportsCar Championship debuts at this event while Dawson Racing was absent. Dan Goldburg returned to the #38 Performance Tech Motorsports entry after Mateo Llarena filled in at Watkins Glen. NTE Sport returned after skipping the Lime Rock round.

== Practice ==
There were two practice sessions preceding the start of the race on Sunday, one on Friday and one on Saturday. The first session on Friday afternoon lasted one hour while the second session on Saturday morning lasted 105 minutes.

=== Practice 1 ===
The first practice session took place at 6:10 PM CT on Friday and ended with Harry Tincknell topping the charts for Mazda Motorsports, with a lap time of 2:09.769.

Pos.	Class	No.	Team	Driver	Time	Gap
1	DPi	55	Mazda Motorsports	Harry Tincknell	2:09.769	_
2	DPi	10	Konica Minolta Acura	Filipe Albuquerque	2:10.168	+0.399
3	DPi	01	Cadillac Chip Ganassi Racing	Kevin Magnussen	2:10.577	+0.808

=== Practice 2 ===
The second and final practice session took place at 9:55 AM CT on Saturday and ended with Ricky Taylor topping the charts for Konica Minolta Acura, with a lap time of 1:49.752.

Pos.	Class	No.	Team	Driver	Time	Gap
1	DPi	10	Konica Minolta Acura	Ricky Taylor	1:49.752	_
2	DPi	31	Whelen Engineering Racing	Felipe Nasr	1:50.411	+0.659
3	DPi	5	JDC-Mustang Sampling Racing	Tristan Vautier	1:50.556	+0.804

== Qualifying ==
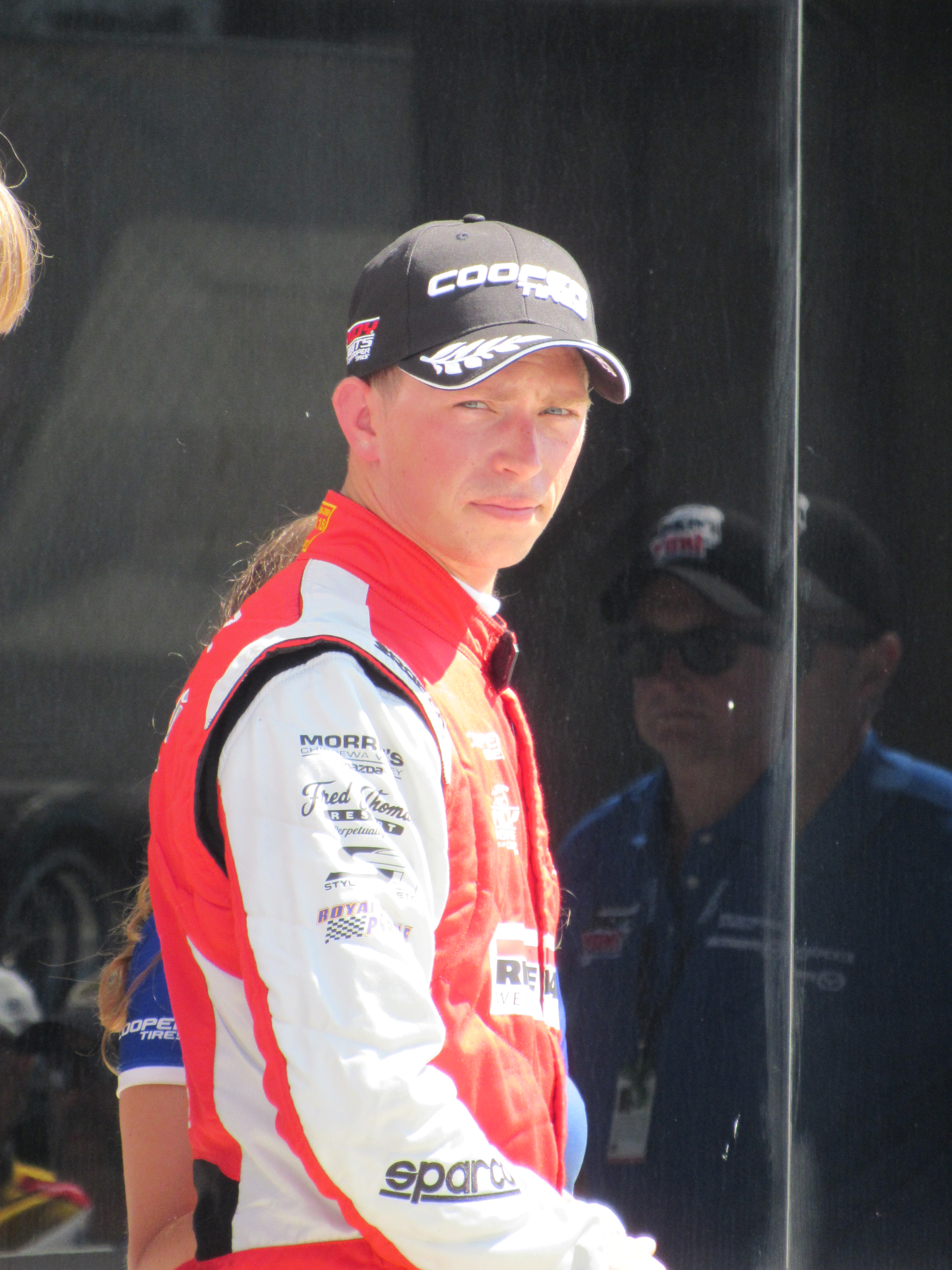
Aaron Telitz (pictured in 2018) set the fastest overall lap time in qualifying.

Qualifying was broken into four sessions. Rain fell and increased as qualifying progressed. The first was for cars in GTD class. Aaron Telitz's No. 14 Lexus was fastest overall, lapping at 2 minutes, 07.195 seconds, beating Trent Hindman's No. 16 Porsche by more than six-tenths of a second. Robby Foley was third in the No. 96 BMW followed by Zacharie Robichon in the No. 9 Pfaff Motorsports Porsche.

The second session was for cars in the GTLM and GTD classes. Jordan Taylor's No. 3 Corvette was 26th overall, and was the fastest GTLM car with a 2 minutes, 20.979 second laps. His teammate Nick Tandy qualified the No. 4 Corvette the GTLM grid's front row and Cooper MacNeil's No. 79 Porsche was third. Laurens Vanthoor set the fastest time in the GTD points paying session and earned 35 championship points.

The third session was for cars in the LMP3 class. Dan Goldburg's No. 38 Performance Tech Motorsports Ligier was 23rd overall and was the fastest LMP3 car with a 2 minutes, 19.106 seconds lap.

The final session of qualifying was for cars in the DPi and LMP2 classes. Felipe Nasr's No. 31 Cadillac was third overall and would start from began from pole position with a 2 minutes, 7.195 seconds lap. He was seven-tenths clear of Ricky Taylor's No. 10 Acura in second. Kevin Magnussen took third for Cadillac Chip Ganassi Racing. Ben Keating's No. 52 Oreca was 22nd overall and was the fastest LMP2 car with a 2 minutes, 18.511 seconds lap. Steven Thomas' No. 11 WIN Autosport Oreca took third and John Farano's No. 8 Tower Motorsport Oreca was third.

=== Qualifying results ===
Pole positions in each class are indicated in bold and by ‡.

Pos.	Class	No.	Team	Driver	Time	Gap	Grid
1	**GTD**	**14**	**(United States) Vasser Sullivan Racing**	**(United States) Aaron Telitz**	**2:07.195**	**_**	21‡
2	GTD	16	(United States) Wright Motorsports	(United States) Trent Hindman	2:07.862	+0.667	22
3	**DPi**	**31**	**(United States) Whelen Engineering Racing**	**(Brazil) Felipe Nasr**	**2:07.919**	**+0.724**	1‡
4	GTD	96	(United States) Turner Motorsport	(United States) Robby Foley	2:07.953	+0.758	23
5	GTD	9	(Canada) Pfaff Motorsports	(Canada) Zacharie Robichon	2:08.209	+1.014	24
6	GTD	39	(United States) CarBahn Motorsports with Peregrine Racing	(United States) Richard Heistand	2:08.341	+1.146	25
7	GTD	23	(United States) Heart Of Racing Team	(Canada) Roman De Angelis	2:08.569	+1.374	26
8	DPi	10	(United States) WTR-Konica Minolta Acura	(United States) Ricky Taylor	2:08.677	+1.482	2
9	GTD	12	(United States) Vasser Sullivan Racing	(United States) Frankie Montecalvo	2:08.702	+1.507	27
10	DPi	55	(Japan) Mazda Motorsports	(United Kingdom) Oliver Jarvis	2:08.716	+1.521	3
11	GTD	1	(United States) Paul Miller Racing	(United States) Madison Snow	2:09.110	+1.915	28
12	DPi	01	(United States) Cadillac Chip Ganassi Racing	(Denmark) Kevin Magnussen	2:09.194	+1.999	4
13	GTD	76	(United States) Compass Racing	(Canada) Jeff Kingsley	2:09.321	+2.126	29
14	GTD	32	(United States) Gilbert Korthoff Motorsports	(United States) Shane Lewis	2:09.990	+2.795	30
15	GTD	88	(United States) Team Hardpoint EBM	(United States) Rob Ferriol	2:10.173	+2.978	31
16	GTD	66	(United States) Gradient Racing	(United Kingdom) Till Bechtolsheimer	2:10.263	+3.068	32
17	GTD	19	(Austria) GRT Grasser Racing Team	(Canada) Misha Goikhberg	2:10.266	+3.071	33
18	DPi	5	(United States) JDC-Mustang Sampling Racing	(France) Tristan Vautier	2:10.497	+3.302	5
19	DPi	60	(United States) Meyer Shank Racing with Curb-Agajanian	(France) Olivier Pla	2:10.500	+3.305	6
20	GTD	44	(United States) Magnus Racing with Archangel Motorsports	(United States) John Potter	2:12.194	+4.999	34
21	GTD	42	(United States) NTE Sport	(United States) Don Yount	2:14.383	+7.188	35
22	**LMP2**	**52**	**(United States) PR1/Mathiasen Motorsports**	**(United States) Ben Keating**	**2:18.511**	**+11.316**	7‡
23	**LMP3**	**38**	**(United States) Performance Tech Motorsports**	**(United States) Dan Goldburg**	**2:19.106**	**+11.911**	11‡
24	LMP3	74	(United States) Riley Motorsports	(United States) Gar Robinson	2:19.419	+12.224	12
25	LMP2	11	(United States) WIN Autosport	(United States) Steven Thomas	2:19.941	+12.746	8
26	**GTLM**	**3**	**(United States) Corvette Racing**	**(United States) Jordan Taylor**	**2:20.979**	**+13.784**	18‡
27	LMP3	36	(United States) Andretti Autosport	(United States) Jarett Andretti	2:21.170	+13.975	13
28	GTLM	4	(United States) Corvette Racing	(United Kingdom) Nick Tandy	2:21.606	+14.411	19
29	LMP3	54	(United States) CORE Autosport	(United States) Jon Bennett	2:21.885	+14.690	14
30	LMP3	61	(United States) Wulver Motorsports	(United States) Augie Pabst	2:22.170	+14.975	15
31	GTLM	79	(United States) WeatherTech Racing	(United States) Cooper MacNeil	2:24.174	+14.979	20
32	LMP2	8	(United States) Tower Motorsport By Starworks	(Canada) John Farano	2:24.176	+14.981	9
33	LMP3	30	(United States) Jr III Motorsports	(Norway) Theodor Olsen	2:24.600	+17.405	17
34	LMP3	91	(United States) Riley Motorsports	(United States) Jim Cox	2:25.260	+18.065	17
35	LMP2	18	(United States) Era Motorsport	(United States) Dwight Merriman	2:27.462	+20.267	10

== Race ==
=== Post-race ===
As a result of winning the race, Derani and Nasr advanced from third to second in the DPi Drivers' Championship. The result kept Keating and Jensen atop the LMP2 Drivers' Championship. The result of the race meant Robinson was still in the lead of the LMP3 Drivers' Championship with 1800 points, but his advantage was reduced to 50 points as a result of Bennett and Braun's victory. The result kept Antonio García and Jordan Taylor atop the GTLM Drivers' Championship. As a result of finishing second place, Auberlen and Foley re took the lead of the GTD Drivers' Championship from De Angelis and Gunn. Robichon and Vanthoor advanced from fourth to third while Sellers and Snow dropped from third to fourth. Cadillac, Chevrolet, and Aston Martin continued to top their respective Manufacturers' Championships while WTR-Konica Minolta Acura, PR1/Mathiasen Motorsports, Riley Motorsports, and Corvette Racing kept their respective advantages in their respective Teams' Championships. Turner Motorsport took the lead of the GTD Teams' Championship with four rounds remaining in the season.

=== Race results ===
Class winners are denoted in bold and ‡.

Pos	Class	No.	Team	Drivers	Chassis	Laps	Time/Retired
Pos	Class	No.	Team	Drivers	Engine	Laps	Time/Retired
1	**DPi**	**31**	**(United States) Whelen Engineering Racing**	**(Brazil) Felipe Nasr (Brazil) Pipo Derani**	**Cadillac DPi-V.R**	**76**	**2:40:24.362‡**
1	**DPi**	**31**	**(United States) Whelen Engineering Racing**	**(Brazil) Felipe Nasr (Brazil) Pipo Derani**	**Cadillac 5.5L V8**	**76**	**2:40:24.362‡**
2	DPi	55	(Canada) Mazda Motorsports	(United Kingdom) Oliver Jarvis (United Kingdom) Harry Tincknell	Mazda RT24-P	76	+1.594
2	DPi	55	(Canada) Mazda Motorsports	(United Kingdom) Oliver Jarvis (United Kingdom) Harry Tincknell	Mazda MZ-2.0T 2.0L Turbo I4	76	+1.594
3	DPi	01	(United States) Cadillac Chip Ganassi Racing	(Netherlands) Renger van der Zande (Denmark) Kevin Magnussen	Cadillac DPi-V.R	76	+5.770
3	DPi	01	(United States) Cadillac Chip Ganassi Racing	(Netherlands) Renger van der Zande (Denmark) Kevin Magnussen	Cadillac 5.5L V8	76	+5.770
4	DPi	10	(United States) Konica Minolta Acura	(United States) Ricky Taylor (Portugal) Filipe Albuquerque	Acura ARX-05	76	+46.781
4	DPi	10	(United States) Konica Minolta Acura	(United States) Ricky Taylor (Portugal) Filipe Albuquerque	Acura AR35TT 3.5L Turbo V6	76	+46.781
5	DPi	60	(United States) Meyer Shank Racing with Curb-Agajanian	(United States) Dane Cameron (France) Olivier Pla	Acura ARX-05	76	+49.018
5	DPi	60	(United States) Meyer Shank Racing with Curb-Agajanian	(United States) Dane Cameron (France) Olivier Pla	Acura AR35TT 3.5L Turbo V6	76	+49.018
6	DPi	5	(United States) JDC-Mustang Sampling Racing	(France) Tristan Vautier (France) Loïc Duval	Cadillac DPi-V.R	76	+1:53.142
6	DPi	5	(United States) JDC-Mustang Sampling Racing	(France) Tristan Vautier (France) Loïc Duval	Cadillac 5.5L V8	76	+1:53.142
7	**LMP2**	**18**	**(United States) Era Motorsport**	**(United States) Dwight Merriman (United Kingdom) Ryan Dalziel**	**Oreca 07**	**75**	**+1 Lap‡**
7	**LMP2**	**18**	**(United States) Era Motorsport**	**(United States) Dwight Merriman (United Kingdom) Ryan Dalziel**	**Gibson GK428 4.2 L V8**	**75**	**+1 Lap‡**
8	LMP2	8	(United States) Tower Motorsport By Starworks	(Canada) John Farano (France) Gabriel Aubry	Oreca 07	75	+1 Lap
8	LMP2	8	(United States) Tower Motorsport By Starworks	(Canada) John Farano (France) Gabriel Aubry	Gibson GK428 4.2 L V8	75	+1 Lap
9	LMP2	52	(United States) PR1/Mathiasen Motorsports	(United States) Ben Keating (Denmark) Mikkel Jensen	Oreca 07	75	+1 Lap
9	LMP2	52	(United States) PR1/Mathiasen Motorsports	(United States) Ben Keating (Denmark) Mikkel Jensen	Gibson GK428 4.2 L V8	75	+1 Lap
10	LMP2	11	(Canada) WIN Autosport	(United States) Tristan Nunez (United States) Steven Thomas	Oreca 07	74	Out of Fuel
10	LMP2	11	(Canada) WIN Autosport	(United States) Tristan Nunez (United States) Steven Thomas	Gibson GK428 4.2 L V8	74	Out of Fuel
11	**LMP3**	**54**	**(United States) CORE Autosport**	**(United States) Jon Bennett (United States) Colin Braun**	**Ligier JS P320**	**73**	**+3 Laps‡**
11	**LMP3**	**54**	**(United States) CORE Autosport**	**(United States) Jon Bennett (United States) Colin Braun**	**Nissan VK56DE 5.6 L V8**	**73**	**+3 Laps‡**
12	**GTLM**	**79**	**(United States) WeatherTech Racing**	**(United States) Cooper MacNeil (Australia) Matt Campbell**	**Porsche 911 RSR-19**	**73**	**+3 Laps‡**
12	**GTLM**	**79**	**(United States) WeatherTech Racing**	**(United States) Cooper MacNeil (Australia) Matt Campbell**	**Porsche 4.2L Flat-6**	**73**	**+3 Laps‡**
13	LMP3	38	(United States) Performance Tech Motorsports	(United States) Dan Goldburg (Sweden) Rasmus Lindh	Ligier JS P320	73	+3 Laps
13	LMP3	38	(United States) Performance Tech Motorsports	(United States) Dan Goldburg (Sweden) Rasmus Lindh	Nissan VK56DE 5.6 L V8	73	+3 Laps
14	GTLM	3	(United States) Corvette Racing	(Spain) Antonio García (United States) Jordan Taylor	Chevrolet Corvette C8.R	73	+3 Laps
14	GTLM	3	(United States) Corvette Racing	(Spain) Antonio García (United States) Jordan Taylor	Chevrolet 5.5L V8	73	+3 Laps
15	LMP3	74	(United States) Riley Motorsports	(United States) Gar Robinson (Brazil) Felipe Fraga	Ligier JS P320	72	+4 Laps
15	LMP3	74	(United States) Riley Motorsports	(United States) Gar Robinson (Brazil) Felipe Fraga	Nissan VK56DE 5.6 L V8	72	+4 Laps
16	LMP3	91	(United States) Riley Motorsports	(United States) Jim Cox (United States) Dylan Murry	Ligier JS P320	72	+4 Laps
16	LMP3	91	(United States) Riley Motorsports	(United States) Jim Cox (United States) Dylan Murry	Nissan VK56DE 5.6 L V8	72	+4 Laps
17	GTLM	4	(United States) Corvette Racing	(United States) Tommy Milner (United Kingdom) Nick Tandy	Chevrolet Corvette C8.R	72	+4 Laps
17	GTLM	4	(United States) Corvette Racing	(United States) Tommy Milner (United Kingdom) Nick Tandy	Chevrolet 5.5L V8	72	+4 Laps
18	LMP3	36	(United States) Andretti Autosport	(United States) Jarett Andretti (United States) Oliver Askew	Ligier JS P320	72	+4 Laps
18	LMP3	36	(United States) Andretti Autosport	(United States) Jarett Andretti (United States) Oliver Askew	Nissan VK56DE 5.6 L V8	72	+4 Laps
19	LMP3	61	(United States) Wulver Motorsports	(Estonia) Tõnis Kasemets (United States) Augie Pabst	Ligier JS P320	71	+5 Laps
19	LMP3	61	(United States) Wulver Motorsports	(Estonia) Tõnis Kasemets (United States) Augie Pabst	Nissan VK56DE 5.6 L V8	71	+5 Laps
20	**GTD**	**9**	**(Canada) Pfaff Motorsports**	**(Canada) Zacharie Robichon (Belgium) Laurens Vanthoor**	**Porsche 911 GT3 R**	**69**	**+7 Laps‡**
20	**GTD**	**9**	**(Canada) Pfaff Motorsports**	**(Canada) Zacharie Robichon (Belgium) Laurens Vanthoor**	**Porsche 4.0L Flat-6**	**69**	**+7 Laps‡**
21	GTD	96	(United States) Turner Motorsport	(United States) Bill Auberlen (United States) Robby Foley	BMW M6 GT3	69	+6 Laps
21	GTD	96	(United States) Turner Motorsport	(United States) Bill Auberlen (United States) Robby Foley	BMW 4.4L Turbo V8	69	+6 Laps
22	GTD	16	(United States) Wright Motorsports	(United States) Trent Hindman (United States) Patrick Long	Porsche 911 GT3 R	69	+7 Laps
22	GTD	16	(United States) Wright Motorsports	(United States) Trent Hindman (United States) Patrick Long	Porsche 4.0L Flat-6	69	+7 Laps
23	GTD	23	(United States) Heart of Racing Team	(Canada) Roman De Angelis (United Kingdom) Ross Gunn	Aston Martin Vantage GT3	69	+7 Laps
23	GTD	23	(United States) Heart of Racing Team	(Canada) Roman De Angelis (United Kingdom) Ross Gunn	Mercedes-Benz M177 4.0 L Turbo V8	69	+7 Laps
24	GTD	14	(United States) Vasser-Sullivan Racing	(United States) Aaron Telitz (United Kingdom) Jack Hawsworth	Lexus RC F GT3	68	+8 Laps
24	GTD	14	(United States) Vasser-Sullivan Racing	(United States) Aaron Telitz (United Kingdom) Jack Hawsworth	Lexus 5.0L V8	68	+8 Laps
25	GTD	12	(United States) Vasser-Sullivan Racing	(United States) Frankie Montecalvo (United States) Zach Veach	Lexus RC F GT3	68	+8 Laps
25	GTD	12	(United States) Vasser-Sullivan Racing	(United States) Frankie Montecalvo (United States) Zach Veach	Lexus 5.0L V8	68	+8 Laps
26	GTD	1	(United States) Paul Miller Racing	(United States) Bryan Sellers (United States) Madison Snow	Lamborghini Huracán GT3 Evo	68	+8 Laps
26	GTD	1	(United States) Paul Miller Racing	(United States) Bryan Sellers (United States) Madison Snow	Lamborghini 5.2L V10	68	+8 Laps
27	GTD	88	(United States) Team Hardpoint EBM	(United States) Rob Ferriol (United Kingdom) Katherine Legge	Porsche 911 GT3 R	68	+8 Laps
27	GTD	88	(United States) Team Hardpoint EBM	(United States) Rob Ferriol (United Kingdom) Katherine Legge	Porsche 4.0L Flat-6	68	+8 Laps
28	GTD	66	(United States) Gradient Racing	(United Kingdom) Till Bechtolsheimer (United States) Marc Miller	Acura NSX GT3 Evo	68	+8 Laps
28	GTD	66	(United States) Gradient Racing	(United Kingdom) Till Bechtolsheimer (United States) Marc Miller	Acura 3.5L Turbo V6	68	+8 Laps
29	GTD	39	(United States) CarBahn with Peregrine Racing	(United States) Richard Heistand (United States) Jeff Westphal	Audi R8 LMS Evo	68	+8 Laps
29	GTD	39	(United States) CarBahn with Peregrine Racing	(United States) Richard Heistand (United States) Jeff Westphal	Audi 5.2L V10	68	+8 Laps
30	GTD	42	(United States) NTE Sport	(United States) J.R. Hildebrand (United States) Don Yount	Audi R8 LMS Evo	68	+8 Laps
30	GTD	42	(United States) NTE Sport	(United States) J.R. Hildebrand (United States) Don Yount	Audi 5.2L V10	68	+8 Laps
31	GTD	76	(United States) Compass Racing	(Canada) Jeff Kingsley (Germany) Mario Farnbacher	Acura NSX GT3 Evo	67	+9 Laps
31	GTD	76	(United States) Compass Racing	(Canada) Jeff Kingsley (Germany) Mario Farnbacher	Acura 3.5L Turbo V6	67	+9 Laps
32 DNF	GTD	44	(United States) Magnus Racing with Archangel Motorsports	(United States) John Potter (United States) Andy Lally	Acura NSX GT3 Evo	62	Lost Wheel
32 DNF	GTD	44	(United States) Magnus Racing with Archangel Motorsports	(United States) John Potter (United States) Andy Lally	Acura 3.5L Turbo V6	62	Lost Wheel
33 DNF	GTD	32	(United States) Gilbert Korthoff Motorsports	(United States) Guy Cosmo (United States) Shane Lewis	Mercedes-AMG GT3 Evo	46	Suspension
33 DNF	GTD	32	(United States) Gilbert Korthoff Motorsports	(United States) Guy Cosmo (United States) Shane Lewis	Mercedes-AMG M159 6.2L V8	46	Suspension
34 DNF	GTD	19	(Austria) GRT Grasser Racing Team	(Canada) Misha Goikhberg (France) Franck Perera	Lamborghini Huracán GT3 Evo	24	Rear End
34 DNF	GTD	19	(Austria) GRT Grasser Racing Team	(Canada) Misha Goikhberg (France) Franck Perera	Lamborghini 5.2L V10	24	Rear End
35 DNF	LMP3	30	(United States) Jr III Motorsports	(Norway) Theodor Olsen (United States) Mike Skeen	Ligier JS P320	8	Rear Axle
35 DNF	LMP3	30	(United States) Jr III Motorsports	(Norway) Theodor Olsen (United States) Mike Skeen	Nissan VK56DE 5.6 L V8	8	Rear Axle

== Standings after the race ==
DPi Drivers' Championship standings
Pos.	+/–	Driver	Points
1		(Portugal) Filipe Albuquerque (United States) Ricky Taylor	2380
2	1	(Brazil) Pipo Derani (Brazil) Felipe Nasr	2339
3	1	(United Kingdom) Oliver Jarvis (United Kingdom) Harry Tincknell	2337
4		(Denmark) Kevin Magnussen (Netherlands) Renger van der Zande	2177
5		(United States) Dane Cameron (France) Olivier Pla	2078

LMP2 Drivers' Championship standings
Pos.	+/–	Driver	Points
1		(Denmark) Mikkel Jensen (United States) Ben Keating	1422
2		(United States) Tristan Nunez (United States) Steven Thomas	1364
3		(France) Gabriel Aubry (Canada) John Farano	1314
4	2	(United Kingdom) Ryan Dalziel (United States) Dwight Merriman	1018
5	1	(United States) Scott Huffaker	702

LMP3 Drivers' Championship standings
Pos.	+/–	Driver	Points
1		(United States) Gar Robinson	1800
2		(United States) Jon Bennett (United States) Colin Braun	1750
3		(United States) Jim Cox (United States) Dylan Murry	1594
4	1	(Sweden) Rasmus Lindh	1538
5	1	(United States) Oliver Askew	1504

GTLM Drivers' Championship standings
Pos.	+/–	Driver	Points
1		(Spain) Antonio García (United States) Jordan Taylor	2207
2		(United States) Tommy Milner (United Kingdom) Nick Tandy	1993
3		(United States) Cooper MacNeil	1984
4	2	(Australia) Matt Campbell	1372
5	1	(United States) John Edwards (Brazil) Augusto Farfus (Finland) Jesse Krohn	1001

GTD Drivers' Championship standings
Pos.	+/–	Driver	Points
1	1	(United States) Bill Auberlen (United States) Robby Foley	1930
2	1	(Canada) Roman De Angelis (United Kingdom) Ross Gunn	1912
3	1	(Canada) Zacharie Robichon (Belgium) Laurens Vanthoor	1830
4	1	(United States) Madison Snow (United States) Bryan Sellers	1806
5		(United States) Patrick Long	1712

- Note: Only the top five positions are included for all sets of standings.

DPi Teams' Championship standings
Pos.	+/–	Team	Points
1		(United States) #10 WTR-Konica Minolta Acura	2380
2	1	(United States) #31 Whelen Engineering Racing	2339
3	1	(Canada) #55 Mazda Motorsports	2337
4		(United States) #01 Cadillac Chip Ganassi Racing	2177
5		(United States) #60 Meyer Shank Racing w/ Curb-Agajanian	2078

LMP2 Teams' Championship standings
Pos.	+/–	Team	Points
1		(United States) #52 PR1 Mathiasen Motorsports	1422
2		(United States) #11 WIN Autosport	1364
3		(United States) #8 Tower Motorsport	1314
4		(United States) #18 Era Motorsport	1018
5		(United States) #22 United Autosports	614

LMP3 Teams' Championship standings
Pos.	+/–	Team	Points
1		(United States) #74 Riley Motorsports	1800
2		(United States) #54 CORE Autosport	1750
3		(United States) #91 Riley Motorsports	1594
4		(United States) #38 Performance Tech Motorsports	1538
5		(United States) #36 Andretti Autosport	1192

GTLM Teams' Championship standings
Pos.	+/–	Team	Points
1		(United States) #3 Corvette Racing	2207
2		(United States) #4 Corvette Racing	1993
3		(United States) #79 WeatherTech Racing	1984
4		(United States) #24 BMW Team RLL	1001
5		(United States) #25 BMW Team RLL	966

GTD Teams' Championship standings
Pos.	+/–	Team	Points
1	1	(United States) #96 Turner Motorsport	1930
2	1	(United States) #23 Heart of Racing Team	1912
3	1	(Canada) #9 Pfaff Motorsports	1830
4	1	(United States) #1 Paul Miller Racing	1806
5		(United States) #16 Wright Motorsports	1712

- Note: Only the top five positions are included for all sets of standings.

DPi Manufacturers' Championship standings
Pos.	+/–	Manufacturer	Points
1		(United States) Cadillac	2574
2		(Japan) Acura	2486
3		(Japan) Mazda	2409

GTLM Manufacturers' Championship standings
Pos.	+/–	Manufacturer	Points
1		(United States) Chevrolet	2230
2		(Germany) Porsche	2108
3		(Germany) BMW	1052
4		(Italy) Ferrari	330

GTD Manufacturers' Championship standings
Pos.	+/–	Manufacturer	Points
1		(United Kingdom) Aston Martin	1984
2	1	(Germany) BMW	1979
3	1	(Germany) Porsche	1964
4	2	(Italy) Lamborghini	1923
5		(Japan) Lexus	1849

- Note: Only the top five positions are included for all sets of standings.

IMSA SportsCar Championship
Previous race: 2021 Northeast Grand Prix	2021 season	Next race: 2021 IMSA Monterey Grand Prix
