= 2023 Motul Course de Monterey =

Fourth round of the 2023 IMSA SportsCar Championship season

The layout of the WeatherTech Raceway Laguna Seca

The 2023 Motul Course de Monterey (formally known as the Motul Course de Monterey Powered by Hyundai N) was a sports car race held at WeatherTech Raceway Laguna Seca near Monterey, California on May 14, 2023. It was the fourth round of the 2023 IMSA SportsCar Championship and the second round of the 2023 WeatherTech Sprint Cup.

== Background ==
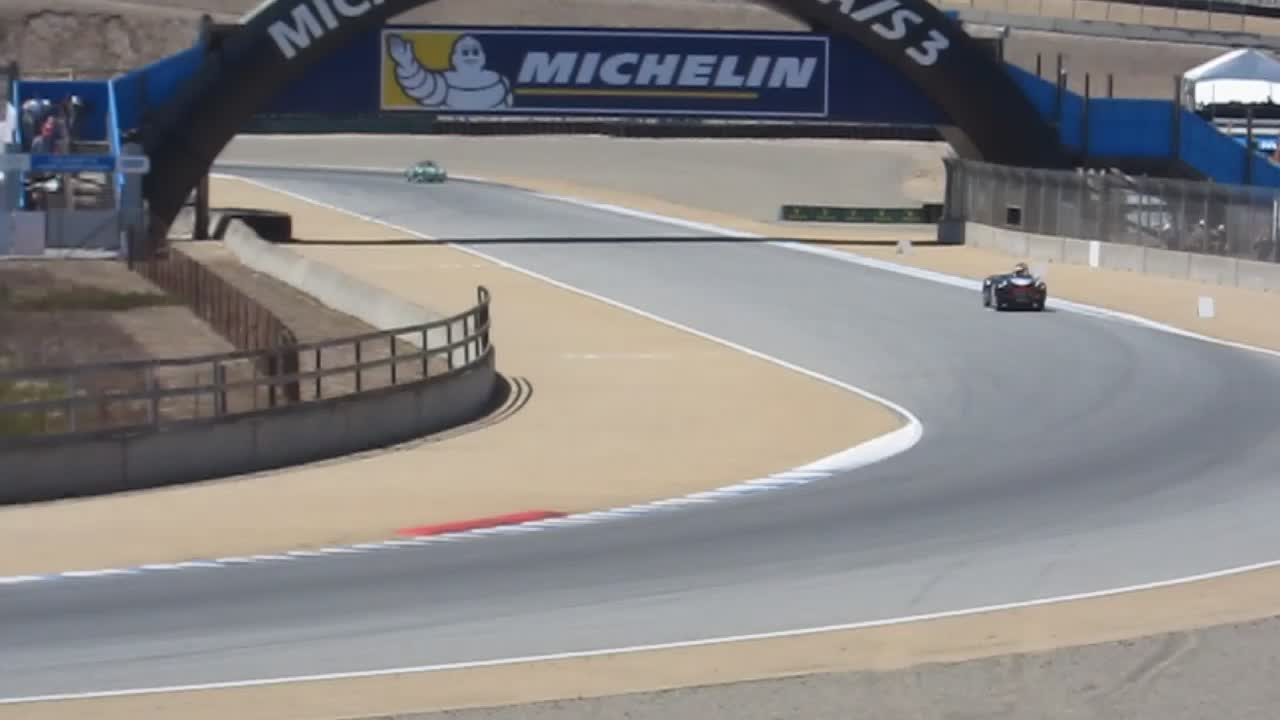
WeatherTech Raceway Laguna Seca, where the race was held.

International Motor Sports Association's (IMSA) president John Doonan confirmed the race was part of the schedule for the 2023 IMSA SportsCar Championship (IMSA SCC) in August 2022. It was the tenth consecutive year it was part of the IMSA SCC. The 2023 Motul Course de Monterey was the fourth of eleven scheduled sports car races of 2023 by IMSA, and the second of seven races of the WeatherTech Sprint Cup. The race was held at the eleven-turn 2.238 mi (3.602 km) WeatherTech Raceway Laguna Seca on May 14, 2023.

After the Grand Prix of Long Beach four weeks earlier, Nick Tandy and Mathieu Jaminet led the GTP Drivers' Championship with 955 points, ahead of Pipo Derani and Alexander Sims with 954 points followed by Filipe Albuquerque and Ricky Taylor with 934 points. With 375 points, the LMP2 Drivers' Championship was led by John Farano, Scott McLaughlin, and Kyffin Simpson with a twenty-five point advantage over Scott Huffaker, Mikkel Jensen, and Steven Thomas. Ben Barnicoat and Jack Hawksworth led the GTD Pro Drivers' Championship with 1067 points ahead of Jules Gounon and Daniel Juncadella with 994 points. In GTD, the Drivers' Championship was led by Bryan Sellers and Madison Snow with 1008 points, ahead of Roman De Angelis and Marco Sørensen with 909 points. Cadillac, Lexus, and BMW were leading their respective Manufacturers' Championships, while Porsche Penske Motorsport, Tower Motorsports, Vasser Sullivan Racing, and Paul Miller Racing each led their own Teams' Championships.

On May 4, 2023, IMSA released the latest technical bulletin outlining Balance of Performance for the GTP, GTD Pro, and GTD classes. In GTP, both Cadillac and BMW received weight reductions, whilst Porsche and Acura received weight increases compared to Long Beach. The Cadillac ran at 1030 kg, the BMW ran at 1031 kg, the Porsche ran at 1038 kg, and the Acura ran at 1049 kg. As a result, the Cadillac ran on 511 kilowatts of power, the BMW on 512 kW, the Porsche on 514 kW, and the Acura on 520 kW. Maximum stint energy figures were also adjusted. In GTD Pro and GTD, the only changes in BoP are a 10 kg weight increase for BMW and a 5-liter decrease of fuel tank capacity for McLaren.

=== Entries ===
A total of 38 cars took part in the event, split across four classes. 9 car were entered in GTP, 8 in LMP2, 5 in GTD Pro, and 16 in GTD. In GTP, the entry list was headlined by the addition of the JDC-Miller MotorSports entry, featuring the first Porsche 963 customer entry on the IMSA SportsCar Championship grid. The car was driven by Tijmen van der Helm and Mike Rockenfeller. In LMP2, the No. 04 CrowdStrike Racing by APR Oreca 07 also entered with Ben Hanley and George Kurtz, even though the car was initially not confirmed as a full-season entry. In GTD, Andretti Autosport debuted their No. 94 Aston Martin Vantage AMR GT3, driven by Jarett Andretti and Gabby Chaves.

== Practice ==
There were two practice sessions preceding the start of the race on Sunday, one on Friday and one on Saturday. The first session lasted 90 minutes on Friday while the second session on Saturday lasted 105 minutes.

=== Practice 1 ===
The first practice session took place at 4:05 pm PT on Friday and ended with Matt Campbell topping the charts for Porsche Penske Motorsport, with a lap time of 1:16.703. Louis Delétraz set the fastest time in LMP2 driving the #8 Tower Motorsports entry. Ben Barnicoat was fastest in GTD Pro while Frankie Montecalvo set the fastest time amongst all GTD cars.

Pos.	Class	No.	Team	Driver	Time	Gap
1	GTP	7	Porsche Penske Motorsport	Matt Campbell	1:16.703	_
2	GTP	60	Meyer Shank Racing with Curb-Agajanian	Colin Braun	1:17.019	+0.316
3	GTP	6	Porsche Penske Motorsport	Mathieu Jaminet	1:17.115	+0.412

=== Final Practice ===
The second and final practice session took place at 8:55 am PT on Saturday and ended with Matt Campbell topping the charts for Porsche Penske Motorsport, with a lap time of 1:15.493. Ed Jones set the fastest time in LMP2. The GTD Pro class was topped by the #23 Heart of Racing Team Aston Martin Vantage AMR GT3 of Alex Riberas while Loris Spinelli was fastest in GTD.

Pos.	Class	No.	Team	Driver	Time	Gap
1	GTP	7	Porsche Penske Motorsport	Matt Campbell	1:15.493	_
2	GTP	31	Whelen Engineering Racing	Pipo Derani	1:15.642	+0.149
3	GTP	60	Meyer Shank Racing with Curb-Agajanian	Colin Braun	1:15.716	+0.223

== Qualifying ==
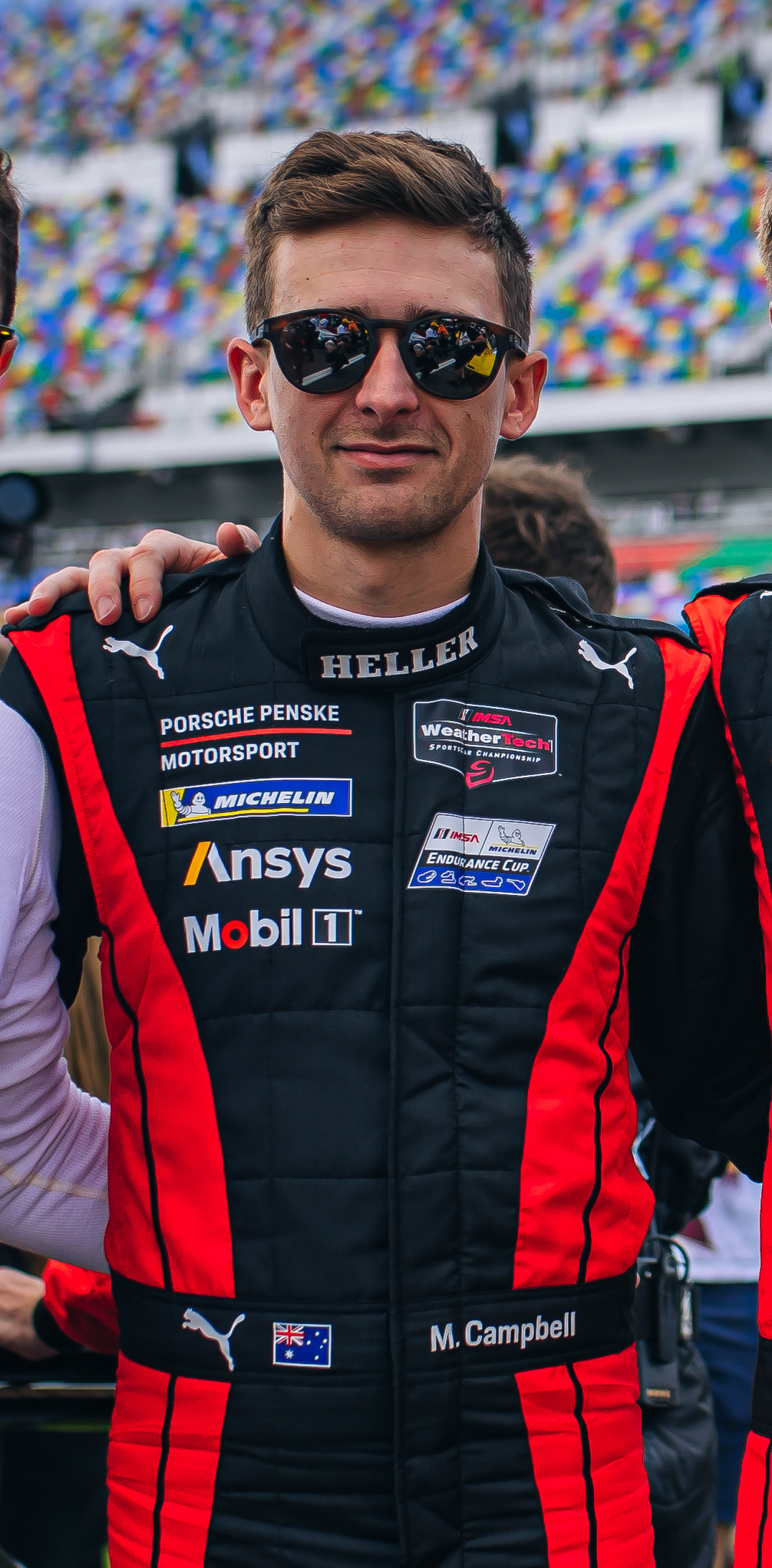
Matt Campbell (pictured in 2024) helped take the No. 7 Porsche's first pole position of 2023.

Saturday's afternoon qualifying was broken into three sessions, with one session for the GTP, LMP2, and GTD Pro and GTD classes, which lasted for 20 minutes for the GTP session, and 15 minutes for the LMP2, and GTD Pro/GTD sessions. The rules dictated that all teams nominated a driver to qualify their cars, with the Pro-Am LMP2 class requiring a Bronze rated driver to qualify the car. The competitors' fastest lap times determined the starting order. IMSA then arranged the grid to put GTPs ahead of the LMP2, GTD Pro, and GTD cars.

Qualifying was broken into three sessions. The first was cars in the GTD Pro and GTD classes. Klaus Bachler qualified on pole in GTD Pro driving the #9 Pfaff Motorsports entry. Alec Udell qualified on pole in GTD driving the #92 Kelly-Moss with Riley entry, besting Roman De Angelis in the #27 Heart of Racing Team entry.

The second session of qualifying was for cars in the LMP2 class. George Kurtz qualified on pole for the class driving the #04 car for CrowdStrike Racing by APR.

The final session of qualifying was for the GTP class. Matt Campbell qualified on pole driving the No. 7 car for Porsche Penske Motorsport, beating Mathieu Jaminet in the sister #6 car for Porsche Penske Motorsport by less than one tenth of a second.

=== Qualifying results ===
Pole positions in each class are indicated in bold and by ‡.

Pos.	Class	No.	Team	Driver	Time	Gap	Grid
1	**GTP**	**7**	**Porsche Penske Motorsport**	**(Australia) Matt Campbell**	**1:14.774**	**_**	1‡
2	GTP	6	Porsche Penske Motorsport	(France) Mathieu Jaminet	1:14.864	+0.090	2
3	GTP	60	Meyer Shank Racing with Curb-Agajanian	(United States) Colin Braun	1:14.979	+0.205	3
4	GTP	31	Whelen Engineering Racing	(Brazil) Pipo Derani	1:15.007	+0.233	4
5	GTP	10	Wayne Taylor Racing with Andretti Autosport	(United States) Ricky Taylor	1:15.303	+0.529	5
6	GTP	01	Cadillac Racing	(France) Sébastien Bourdais	1:15.335	+0.561	6
7	GTP	25	BMW M Team RLL	(United States) Connor De Phillippi	1:15.648	+0.874	7
8	GTP	24	BMW M Team RLL	(Austria) Philipp Eng	1:15.747	+0.973	8
9	GTP	5	JDC-Miller MotorSports	(Netherlands) Tijmen van der Helm	1:16.995	+2.221	9
10	**LMP2**	**04**	**CrowdStrike Racing by APR**	**(United States) George Kurtz**	**1:19.262**	**+4.488**	10‡
11	LMP2	52	PR1/Mathiasen Motorsports	(United States) Ben Keating	1:19.323	+4.549	11
12	LMP2	11	TDS Racing	(United States) Steven Thomas	1:19.718	+4.944	12
13	LMP2	35	TDS Racing	(France) François Heriau	1:20.475	+5.701	16
14	LMP2	51	Rick Ware Racing	(United States) Eric Lux	1:20.625	+5.851	17
15	LMP2	20	High Class Racing	(Denmark) Dennis Andersen	1:20.655	+5.881	13
16	LMP2	8	Tower Motorsports	(Canada) John Farano	1:21.055	+6.281	14
17	LMP2	18	Era Motorsport	(United States) Dwight Merriman	1:21.912	+7.138	15
18	**GTD Pro**	**9**	**Pfaff Motorsports**	**(Austria) Klaus Bachler**	**1:24.529**	**+9.755**	18‡
19	**GTD**	**92**	**Kelly-Moss with Riley**	**(United States) Alec Udell**	**1:24.539**	**+9.765**	19‡
20	GTD	27	Heart of Racing Team	(Canada) Roman De Angelis	1:24.647	+9.873	20
21	GTD Pro	23	Heart of Racing Team	(Spain) Alex Riberas	1:24.654	+9.880	21
22	GTD Pro	79	WeatherTech Racing	(Spain) Daniel Juncadella	1:24.706	+9.932	22
23	GTD Pro	14	Vasser Sullivan Racing	(United Kingdom) Jack Hawksworth	1:24.727	+9.953	23
24	GTD Pro	3	Corvette Racing	(United States) Jordan Taylor	1:24.907	+10.133	24
25	GTD	80	AO Racing Team	(United Kingdom) Sebastian Priaulx	1:25.005	+10.231	25
26	GTD	12	Vasser Sullivan Racing	(United States) Frankie Montecalvo	1:25.085	+10.311	26
27	GTD	1	Paul Miller Racing	(United States) Madison Snow	1:25.260	+10.486	27
28	GTD	32	Team Korthoff Motorsports	(United States) Mike Skeen	1:25.433	+10.659	28
29	GTD	96	Turner Motorsport	(United States) Patrick Gallagher	1:25.440	+10.666	29
30	GTD	57	Winward Racing	(United States) Russell Ward	1:25.442	+10.668	30
31	GTD	91	Kelly-Moss with Riley	(United States) Alan Metni	1:25.601	+10.827	31
32	GTD	70	Inception Racing	(United States) Brendan Iribe	1:25.842	+11.068	32
33	GTD	78	Forte Racing powered by US RaceTronics	(Canada) Misha Goikhberg	1:25.927	+11.153	33
34	GTD	97	Turner Motorsport	(United States) Chandler Hull	1:26.227	+11.453	34
35	GTD	94	Andretti Autosport	(United States) Jarett Andretti	1:26.289	+11.515	35
36	GTD	66	Gradient Racing	(United States) Sheena Monk	1:26.363	+11.589	36
37	GTD	77	Wright Motorsports	(United States) Alan Brynjolfsson	1:26.365	+11.591	37
38	GTD	44	Magnus Racing	(United States) John Potter	1:26.415	+11.641	38

== Race ==
=== Post-race ===
The result kept Tandy and Jaminet atop the GTP Drivers' Championship, 25 points ahead of Derani and Sims. Bourdais and van der Zande advanced from sixth to fourth. In the LMP2 Drivers' Championship, Loup Chatin and Keating advanced from fourth to second while Farano dropped from first to third. The result kept Barnicoat and Hawksworth atop the GTD Pro Drivers' Championship. The result kept Sellers and Snow atop the GTD Drivers' Championship while Iribe and Schandorff advanced from fourth to second. Cadillac, Lexus, and BMW continued to top their respective Manufacturers' Championships, while Porsche Penske Motorsport, Vasser Sullivan Racing, and Paul Miller Racing kept their respective advantages in their respective of Teams' Championships. TDS Racing took the lead in the LMP2 Teams' Championships with seven races remaining in the season.

Class winners are in bold and ‡.

Pos	Class	No	Team	Drivers	Chassis	Laps	Time/Retired
Pos	Class	No	Team	Drivers	Engine	Laps	Time/Retired
1	**GTP**	**01**	**(United States) Cadillac Racing**	**(France) Sébastien Bourdais (Netherlands) Renger van der Zande**	**Cadillac V-Series.R**	**102**	**2:41:02.933‡**
1	**GTP**	**01**	**(United States) Cadillac Racing**	**(France) Sébastien Bourdais (Netherlands) Renger van der Zande**	**Cadillac LMC55R 5.5 L V8**	**102**	**2:41:02.933‡**
2	GTP	6	(Germany) Porsche Penske Motorsport	(France) Mathieu Jaminet (United Kingdom) Nick Tandy	Porsche 963	102	+3.882
2	GTP	6	(Germany) Porsche Penske Motorsport	(France) Mathieu Jaminet (United Kingdom) Nick Tandy	Porsche 9RD 4.6 L Turbo V8	102	+3.882
3	GTP	31	(United States) Whelen Engineering Racing	(Brazil) Pipo Derani (United Kingdom) Alexander Sims	Cadillac V-Series.R	102	+10.636
3	GTP	31	(United States) Whelen Engineering Racing	(Brazil) Pipo Derani (United Kingdom) Alexander Sims	Cadillac LMC55R 5.5 L V8	102	+10.636
4	GTP	10	(United States) Wayne Taylor Racing with Andretti Autosport	(Portugal) Filipe Albuquerque (United States) Ricky Taylor	Acura ARX-06	102	+21.041
4	GTP	10	(United States) Wayne Taylor Racing with Andretti Autosport	(Portugal) Filipe Albuquerque (United States) Ricky Taylor	Acura AR24e 2.4 L Turbo V6	102	+21.041
5	GTP	24	(United States) BMW M Team RLL	(Austria) Philipp Eng (Brazil) Augusto Farfus	BMW M Hybrid V8	102	+22.818
5	GTP	24	(United States) BMW M Team RLL	(Austria) Philipp Eng (Brazil) Augusto Farfus	BMW P66/3 4.0 L Turbo V8	102	+22.818
6	GTP	60	(United States) Meyer Shank Racing with Curb-Agajanian	(United Kingdom) Tom Blomqvist (United States) Colin Braun	Acura ARX-06	102	+23.109
6	GTP	60	(United States) Meyer Shank Racing with Curb-Agajanian	(United Kingdom) Tom Blomqvist (United States) Colin Braun	Acura AR24e 2.4 L Turbo V6	102	+23.109
7	GTP	5	(United States) JDC-Miller MotorSports	(Germany) Mike Rockenfeller (Netherlands) Tijmen van der Helm	Porsche 963	102	+23.818
7	GTP	5	(United States) JDC-Miller MotorSports	(Germany) Mike Rockenfeller (Netherlands) Tijmen van der Helm	Porsche 9RD 4.6 L Turbo V8	102	+23.818
8	**LMP2**	**11**	**(France) TDS Racing**	**(Denmark) Mikkel Jensen (United States) Steven Thomas**	**Oreca 07**	**102**	**+43.809‡**
8	**LMP2**	**11**	**(France) TDS Racing**	**(Denmark) Mikkel Jensen (United States) Steven Thomas**	**Gibson GK428 4.2 L V8 engine**	**102**	**+43.809‡**
9	GTP	25	(United States) BMW M Team RLL	(United States) Connor De Phillippi (United Kingdom) Nick Yelloly	BMW M Hybrid V8	102	+45.677
9	GTP	25	(United States) BMW M Team RLL	(United States) Connor De Phillippi (United Kingdom) Nick Yelloly	BMW P66/3 4.0 L Turbo V8	102	+45.677
10	LMP2	52	(United States) PR1/Mathiasen Motorsports	(France) Paul-Loup Chatin (United States) Ben Keating	Oreca 07	102	+48.904
10	LMP2	52	(United States) PR1/Mathiasen Motorsports	(France) Paul-Loup Chatin (United States) Ben Keating	Gibson GK428 4.2 L V8 engine	102	+48.904
11	LMP2	04	(United States) CrowdStrike Racing by APR	(United Kingdom) Ben Hanley (United States) George Kurtz	Oreca 07	102	+49.158
11	LMP2	04	(United States) CrowdStrike Racing by APR	(United Kingdom) Ben Hanley (United States) George Kurtz	Gibson GK428 4.2 L V8 engine	102	+49.158
12	LMP2	35	(France) TDS Racing	(Netherlands) Giedo van der Garde (France) François Heriau	Oreca 07	102	+50.003
12	LMP2	35	(France) TDS Racing	(Netherlands) Giedo van der Garde (France) François Heriau	Gibson GK428 4.2 L V8 engine	102	+50.003
13	LMP2	51	(United States) Rick Ware Racing	(United States) Eric Lux (Colombia) Juan Pablo Montoya	Oreca 07	102	+1:03.324
13	LMP2	51	(United States) Rick Ware Racing	(United States) Eric Lux (Colombia) Juan Pablo Montoya	Gibson GK428 4.2 L V8 engine	102	+1:03.324
14	LMP2	20	(Denmark) High Class Racing	(Denmark) Dennis Andersen (United Arab Emirates) Ed Jones	Oreca 07	102	+1:04.674
14	LMP2	20	(Denmark) High Class Racing	(Denmark) Dennis Andersen (United Arab Emirates) Ed Jones	Gibson GK428 4.2 L V8 engine	102	+1:04.674
15	LMP2	18	(United States) Era Motorsport	(United Kingdom) Ryan Dalziel (United States) Dwight Merriman	Oreca 07	100	+2 Laps
15	LMP2	18	(United States) Era Motorsport	(United Kingdom) Ryan Dalziel (United States) Dwight Merriman	Gibson GK428 4.2 L V8 engine	100	+2 Laps
16	**GTD**	**91**	**(United States) Kelly-Moss with Riley**	**(Netherlands) Kay van Berlo (United States) Alan Metni**	**Porsche 911 GT3 R (992)**	**97**	**+5 Laps‡**
16	**GTD**	**91**	**(United States) Kelly-Moss with Riley**	**(Netherlands) Kay van Berlo (United States) Alan Metni**	**Porsche 4.2 L Flat-6**	**97**	**+5 Laps‡**
17	GTD	97	(United States) Turner Motorsport	(United States) Bill Auberlen (United States) Chandler Hull	BMW M4 GT3	97	+5 Laps
17	GTD	97	(United States) Turner Motorsport	(United States) Bill Auberlen (United States) Chandler Hull	BMW S58B30T0 3.0 L Turbo I6	97	+5 Laps
18	GTD	92	(United States) Kelly-Moss with Riley	(France) Julien Andlauer (United States) Alec Udell	Porsche 911 GT3 R (992)	97	+5 Laps
18	GTD	92	(United States) Kelly-Moss with Riley	(France) Julien Andlauer (United States) Alec Udell	Porsche 4.2 L Flat-6	97	+5 Laps
19	GTD	44	(United States) Magnus Racing	(United States) Andy Lally (United States) John Potter	Aston Martin Vantage AMR GT3	97	+5 Laps
19	GTD	44	(United States) Magnus Racing	(United States) Andy Lally (United States) John Potter	Aston Martin 4.0 L Turbo V8	97	+5 Laps
20	GTD	70	(United Kingdom) Inception Racing	(United States) Brendan Iribe (Denmark) Frederik Schandorff	McLaren 720S GT3 Evo	97	+5 Laps
20	GTD	70	(United Kingdom) Inception Racing	(United States) Brendan Iribe (Denmark) Frederik Schandorff	McLaren M840T 4.0 L Turbo V8	97	+5 Laps
21	GTD	77	(United States) Wright Motorsports	(United States) Alan Brynjolfsson (United States) Trent Hindman	Porsche 911 GT3 R (992)	97	+5 Laps
21	GTD	77	(United States) Wright Motorsports	(United States) Alan Brynjolfsson (United States) Trent Hindman	Porsche 4.2 L Flat-6	97	+5 Laps
22	GTD	96	(United States) Turner Motorsport	(United States) Robby Foley (United States) Patrick Gallagher	BMW M4 GT3	97	+5 Laps
22	GTD	96	(United States) Turner Motorsport	(United States) Robby Foley (United States) Patrick Gallagher	BMW S58B30T0 3.0 L Turbo I6	97	+5 Laps
23	**GTD Pro**	**79**	**(United States) WeatherTech Racing**	**(Spain) Daniel Juncadella (Andorra) Jules Gounon**	**Mercedes-AMG GT3 Evo**	**97**	**+5 Laps‡**
23	**GTD Pro**	**79**	**(United States) WeatherTech Racing**	**(Spain) Daniel Juncadella (Andorra) Jules Gounon**	**Mercedes-AMG M159 6.2 L V8**	**97**	**+5 Laps‡**
24	GTD	27	(United States) Heart of Racing Team	(Canada) Roman De Angelis (Denmark) Marco Sørensen	Aston Martin Vantage AMR GT3	97	+5 Laps
24	GTD	27	(United States) Heart of Racing Team	(Canada) Roman De Angelis (Denmark) Marco Sørensen	Aston Martin 4.0 L Turbo V8	97	+5 Laps
25	GTD	78	(United States) Forte Racing powered by US RaceTronics	(Canada) Misha Goikhberg (Italy) Loris Spinelli	Lamborghini Huracán GT3 Evo 2	97	+5 Laps
25	GTD	78	(United States) Forte Racing powered by US RaceTronics	(Canada) Misha Goikhberg (Italy) Loris Spinelli	Lamborghini 5.2 L V10	97	+5 Laps
26	GTD	1	(United States) Paul Miller Racing	(United States) Bryan Sellers (United States) Madison Snow	BMW M4 GT3	97	+5 Laps
26	GTD	1	(United States) Paul Miller Racing	(United States) Bryan Sellers (United States) Madison Snow	BMW S58B30T0 3.0 L Turbo I6	97	+5 Laps
27	GTD Pro	14	(United States) Vasser Sullivan Racing	(United Kingdom) Jack Hawksworth (United Kingdom) Ben Barnicoat	Lexus RC F GT3	97	+5 Laps
27	GTD Pro	14	(United States) Vasser Sullivan Racing	(United Kingdom) Jack Hawksworth (United Kingdom) Ben Barnicoat	Toyota 2UR 5.0 L V8	97	+5 Laps
28	GTD Pro	9	(Canada) Pfaff Motorsports	(Austria) Klaus Bachler (France) Patrick Pilet	Porsche 911 GT3 R (992)	97	+5 Laps
28	GTD Pro	9	(Canada) Pfaff Motorsports	(Austria) Klaus Bachler (France) Patrick Pilet	Porsche 4.2 L Flat-6	97	+5 Laps
29	GTD	80	(United States) AO Racing Team	(United States) Gunnar Jeannette (United Kingdom) Sebastian Priaulx	Porsche 911 GT3 R (992)	97	+5 Laps
29	GTD	80	(United States) AO Racing Team	(United States) Gunnar Jeannette (United Kingdom) Sebastian Priaulx	Porsche 4.2 L Flat-6	97	+5 Laps
30	GTD Pro	3	(United States) Corvette Racing	(Spain) Antonio García (United States) Jordan Taylor	Chevrolet Corvette C8.R GTD	95	+7 Laps
30	GTD Pro	3	(United States) Corvette Racing	(Spain) Antonio García (United States) Jordan Taylor	Chevrolet 5.5 L V8	95	+7 Laps
31	GTD Pro	23	(United States) Heart of Racing Team	(United Kingdom) Ross Gunn (Spain) Alex Riberas	Aston Martin Vantage AMR GT3	95	+7 Laps
31	GTD Pro	23	(United States) Heart of Racing Team	(United Kingdom) Ross Gunn (Spain) Alex Riberas	Aston Martin 4.0 L Turbo V8	95	+7 Laps
32	GTP	7	(Germany) Porsche Penske Motorsport	(Australia) Matt Campbell (Brazil) Felipe Nasr	Porsche 963	94	+8 Laps
32	GTP	7	(Germany) Porsche Penske Motorsport	(Australia) Matt Campbell (Brazil) Felipe Nasr	Porsche 9RD 4.6 L Turbo V8	94	+8 Laps
33 DNF	GTD	57	(United States) Winward Racing	(United Kingdom) Philip Ellis (United States) Russell Ward	Mercedes-AMG GT3 Evo	86	Did not finish
33 DNF	GTD	57	(United States) Winward Racing	(United Kingdom) Philip Ellis (United States) Russell Ward	Mercedes-AMG M159 6.2 L V8	86	Did not finish
34	GTD	66	(United States) Gradient Racing	(United Kingdom) Katherine Legge (United States) Sheena Monk	Acura NSX GT3 Evo22	75	+27 Laps
34	GTD	66	(United States) Gradient Racing	(United Kingdom) Katherine Legge (United States) Sheena Monk	Acura 3.5 L Turbo V6	75	+27 Laps
35 DNF	GTD	12	(United States) Vasser Sullivan Racing	(United States) Frankie Montecalvo (United States) Aaron Telitz	Lexus RC F GT3	58	Did not finish
35 DNF	GTD	12	(United States) Vasser Sullivan Racing	(United States) Frankie Montecalvo (United States) Aaron Telitz	Toyota 2UR 5.0 L V8	58	Did not finish
36 DNF	GTD	32	(United States) Team Korthoff Motorsports	(Canada) Mikaël Grenier (United States) Mike Skeen	Mercedes-AMG GT3 Evo	37	Did not finish
36 DNF	GTD	32	(United States) Team Korthoff Motorsports	(Canada) Mikaël Grenier (United States) Mike Skeen	Mercedes-AMG M159 6.2 L V8	37	Did not finish
37 DNF	LMP2	8	(United States) Tower Motorsports	(Switzerland) Louis Delétraz (Canada) John Farano	Oreca 07	34	Did not finish
37 DNF	LMP2	8	(United States) Tower Motorsports	(Switzerland) Louis Delétraz (Canada) John Farano	Gibson GK428 4.2 L V8 engine	34	Did not finish
38 DNF	GTD	94	(United States) Andretti Autosport	(United States) Jarett Andretti (Colombia) Gabby Chaves	Aston Martin Vantage AMR GT3	9	Did not finish
38 DNF	GTD	94	(United States) Andretti Autosport	(United States) Jarett Andretti (Colombia) Gabby Chaves	Aston Martin 4.0 L Turbo V8	9	Did not finish

== Standings after the race ==
GTP Drivers' Championship standings
Pos.	+/–	Driver	Points
1		(United Kingdom) Nick Tandy (France) Mathieu Jaminet	1307
2		(Brazil) Pipo Derani (United Kingdom) Alexander Sims	1282
3		(Portugal) Filipe Albuquerque (United States) Ricky Taylor	1241
4	2	(France) Sébastien Bourdais (Netherlands) Renger van der Zande	1235
5	1	(United States) Connor De Phillippi (United Kingdom) Nick Yelloly	1188

LMP2 Drivers' Championship standings
Pos.	+/–	Driver	Points
1	1	(Denmark) Mikkel Jensen (United States) Steven Thomas	730
2	2	(France) Paul-Loup Chatin (United States) Ben Keating	667
3	2	(Canada) John Farano	629
4	1	(United Kingdom) Ben Hanley (United States) George Kurtz	623
5	2	(United Kingdom) Ryan Dalziel (United States) Dwight Merriman	586

LMP3 Drivers' Championship standings
Pos.	+/–	Driver	Points
1		(Australia) Josh Burdon (Brazil) Felipe Fraga (United States) Gar Robinson	380
2		(United Kingdom) Matt Bell (Canada) Orey Fidani (Germany) Lars Kern	344
3		(United Kingdom) Till Bechtolsheimer (Netherlands) Tijmen van der Helm	332
4		(United States) Daniel Goldburg	332
5		(United Kingdom) Wayne Boyd (Canada) Anthony Mantella (Argentina) Nicolás Varrone	306

GTD Pro Drivers' Championship standings
Pos.	+/–	Driver	Points
1		(United Kingdom) Ben Barnicoat (United Kingdom) Jack Hawksworth	1415
2		(Andorra) Jules Gounon (Spain) Daniel Juncadella	1374
3	1	(Austria) Klaus Bachler (France) Patrick Pilet	1324
4	1	(Spain) Antonio García (United States) Jordan Taylor	1297
5		(United Kingdom) Ross Gunn (Spain) Alex Riberas	1136

GTD Drivers' Championship standings
Pos.	+/–	Driver	Points
1		(United States) Bryan Sellers (United States) Madison Snow	1244
2	2	(United States) Brendan Iribe (Denmark) Frederik Schandorff	1182
3	1	(Canada) Roman De Angelis (Denmark) Marco Sørensen	1171
4	1	(United States) Frankie Montecalvo (United States) Aaron Telitz	1106
5		(United States) Robby Foley (United States) Patrick Gallagher	1023

- Note: Only the top five positions are included for all sets of standings.

GTP Teams' Championship standings
Pos.	+/–	Team	Points
1		(Germany) #6 Porsche Penske Motorsport	1307
2		(United States) #31 Whelen Engineering Racing	1282
3		(United States) #10 WTR with Andretti Autosport	1241
4	2	(United States) #01 Cadillac Racing	1235
5	1	(United States) #25 BMW M Team RLL	1188

LMP2 Teams' Championship standings
Pos.	+/–	Team	Points
1	1	(France) #11 TDS Racing	730
2	2	(United States) #52 PR1/Mathiasen Motorsports	667
3	2	(United States) #8 Tower Motorsports	629
4	1	(United States) #04 CrowdStrike Racing by APR	623
5	2	(United States) #18 Era Motorsport	586

LMP3 Teams' Championship standings
Pos.	+/–	Team	Points
1		(United States) #74 Riley Motorsports	380
2		(Canada) #13 AWA	344
3		(United States) #85 JDC-Miller MotorSports	332
4		(Canada) #17 AWA	306
5		(United States) #4 Ave Motorsports	282

GTD Pro Teams' Championship standings
Pos.	+/–	Team	Points
1		(United States) #14 Vasser Sullivan Racing	1415
2		(United States) #79 WeatherTech Racing	1374
3	1	(Canada) #9 Pfaff Motorsports	1324
4	1	(United States) #3 Corvette Racing	1297
5		(United States) #23 Heart of Racing Team	1136

GTD Teams' Championship standings
Pos.	+/–	Team	Points
1		(United States) #1 Paul Miller Racing	1244
2	2	(United Kingdom) #70 Inception Racing	1182
3	1	(United States) #27 Heart of Racing Team	1171
4	1	(United States) #12 Vasser Sullivan Racing	1106
5		(United States) #96 Turner Motorsport	1023

- Note: Only the top five positions are included for all sets of standings.

GTP Manufacturers' Championship standings
Pos.	+/–	Manufacturer	Points
1		(United States) Cadillac	1447
2	1	(Germany) Porsche	1375
3	1	(Japan) Acura	1344
4	2	(Germany) BMW	1334

GTD Pro Manufacturers' Championship standings
Pos.	+/–	Manufacturer	Points
1		(Japan) Lexus	1415
2		(Germany) Mercedes-AMG	1374
3	1	(Germany) Porsche	1324
4	1	(United States) Chevrolet	1297
5		(United Kingdom) Aston Martin	1146

GTD Manufacturers' Championship standings
Pos.	+/–	Manufacturer	Points
1		(Germany) BMW	1378
2		(United Kingdom) Aston Martin	1348
3		(United Kingdom) McLaren	1264
4	1	(Germany) Porsche	1251
5	1	(Japan) Lexus	1210

- Note: Only the top five positions are included for all sets of standings.

IMSA SportsCar Championship
Previous race: 2023 Grand Prix of Long Beach	2023 season	Next race: 2023 Sahlen's Six Hours of The Glen
