= Madison Snow =

American racing driver (born 1995)

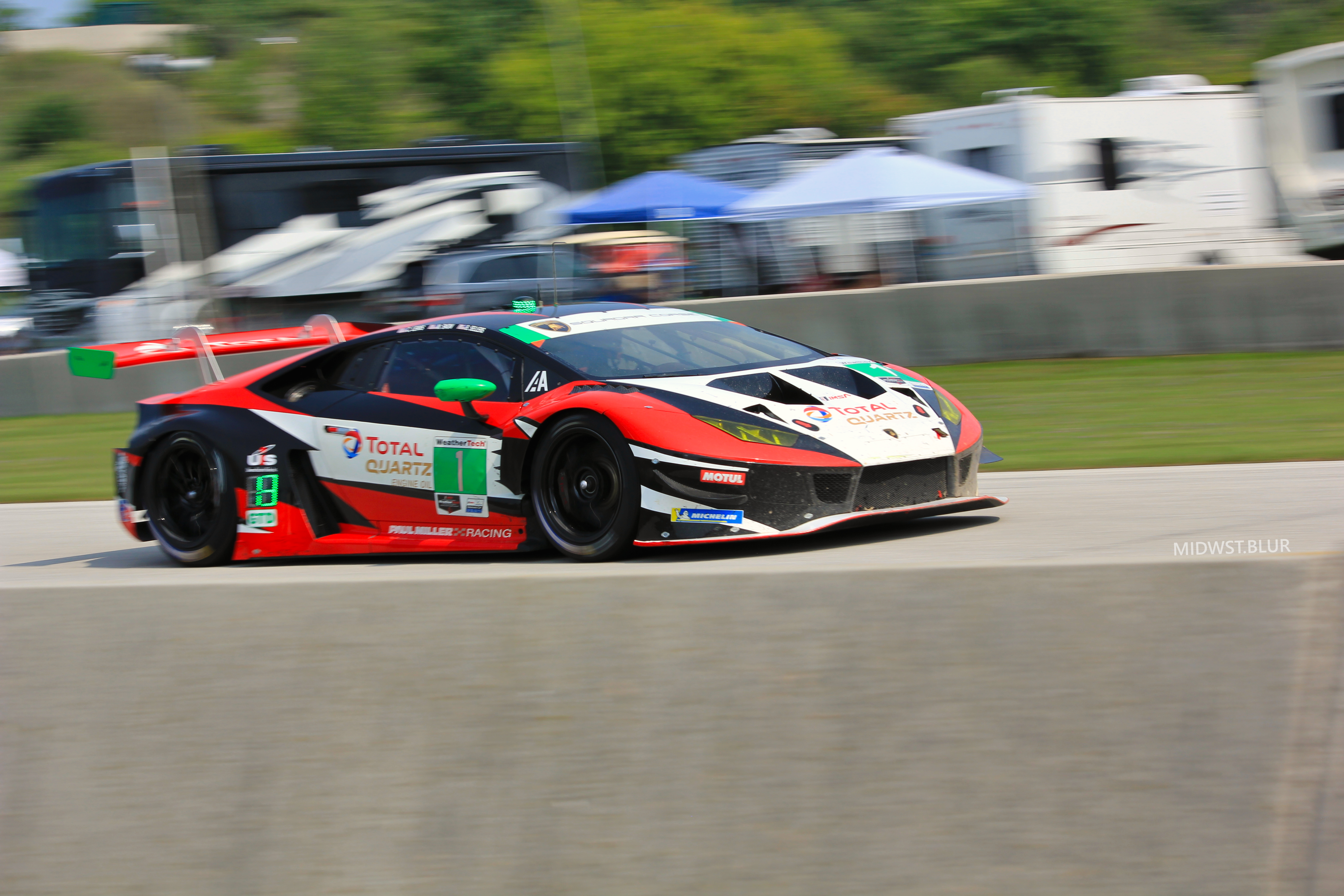
- Snow at Road America in 2021
- Nationality: American
- Born: December 26, 1995 (age 30) American Fork, Utah, U.S.

IMSA SportsCar Championship career
- Debut season: 2014
- Current team: Paul Miller Racing
- Categorisation: FIA Silver (until 2023) (Note: Despite remaining Silver-rated by the FIA, Snow had his rating bumped to Gold by IMSA for 2019.); FIA Gold (2024–)
- Car number: 1
- Former teams: Snow Racing; Wright Motorsports
- Starts: 88
- Wins: 13
- Podiums: 39
- Poles: 12

Previous series
- Lamborghini Super Trofeo North America IMSA GT3 Cup Challenge: 2016, 2018, 2020, 2021 2011–2013

Championship titles
- 2024 2023 2023 2022 2020 2020 2018 2018 2013 2011: IMSA Michelin Endurance Cup – GTD Pro; IMSA SportsCar Championship – GTD; IMSA WeatherTech Sprint Cup - GTD; IMSA WeatherTech Sprint Cup - GTD; Lamborghini Super Trofeo North America – Pro; IMSA Michelin Endurance Cup - GTD; IMSA SportsCar Championship – GTD; Lamborghini Super Trofeo North America – Pro; IMSA GT3 Cup Challenge – Platinum; IMSA GT3 Cup Challenge – Gold

Madison Snow (born December 26, 1995) is an American race car driver who lastly competes in the IMSA SportsCar Championship for Magnus Racing. In 2018 he became the second driver in IMSA history to win two championships in the same year, winning both the WeatherTech SportsCar Championship’s GT Daytona (GTD) class as well as the Lamborghini Super Trofeo North America Pro class. He scored his second GTD class championship in 2023.

From 2024 to 2025, Snow was a factory BMW M Motorsport works driver.

== Career ==
=== Porsche Cup ===
After just over a decade spent in karting, Snow moved to sports car racing in 2010, competing for a short time in Miatas before transitioning into the IMSA GT3 Cup Challenge for 2011. In his opening season of Porsche cup competition, at just 15 years of age, Snow was crowned Gold Class champion, winning six of the 15 scheduled races and collecting 12 podiums. Two years later, he was crowned champion of the Platinum class, making him the youngest overall champion in series history.

At the 2013 24 Hours of Daytona, Madison and his mother Melanie became the first mother/son pairing in the race's history. At the tail end of the 2013 season, Snow was drafted in to complete Flying Lizard Motorsports' Petit Le Mans lineup alongside Spencer Pumpelly and Nelson Canache Jr. The team would finish the race as class winners. Due to his successes in the Porsche GT3 Cup car over the course of the previous three seasons, Snow was also invited to take part in the North American Porsche Youth Driver Academy at Barber Motorsports Park.

Alongside a full-season drive in the newly-formed IMSA SportsCar Championship with his family-owned team, Snow also competed with Extreme Speed Motorsports for a partial schedule in the Cooper Tires Prototype Lites during the 2014 season. Tallying three podiums in IMSA, he finished seventh in the GTD-class standings alongside co-driver Jan Heylen.

=== Paul Miller Racing ===
After running a partial season in 2015 with Wright Motorsports and Park Place Motorsports; Snow returned to full-time IMSA competition in 2016 with Paul Miller Racing and was paired with Bryan Sellers in a Lamborghini Huracan GT3. They finished 3rd in the championship that year with a total of three podiums, including a win at Virginia International Raceway. In 2017 the duo had two podium finished, and after a penalty resulting in loss of championship points, they finished 9th. In 2018 Snow and Sellers won the GTD Championship, as well as the 2018 12 Hours of Sebring and the Northeast Grand Prix at Lime Rock Park. The duo took 9 podium finishes out of 12 races. They narrowly beat Katherine Legge in what remains the hardest fought GTD championship to date, requiring an average finish of third place. Following the conclusion of their championship winning season, Snow left racing as a result of driver rating adjustments that would have prevented him from competing alongside Sellers. While his FIA Drivers' Categorization status would remain Silver, defining him as an amateur driver, IMSA was set to upgrade his status to Gold, defining him as a professional driver in IMSA-organized competitions. Due to competition requirements that GTD class entries must field one professional and one amateur driver, Snow would not have been able to continue alongside Sellers due to both holding a professional status, contributing to his decision to end his racing career.

However, his retirement was rather short-lived. IMSA rescinded their promotion after Snow sat out the 2019 season, focusing instead on his full-time job which he still maintains today, and he returned to Paul Miller Racing in 2020.

In Snow's first race back in 2020 he captured a win at the 2020 24 Hours of Daytona along with Corey Lewis and Andrea Caldarelli. Due to Covid-19, however, they were unable to complete the full season and instead participated in only select races. Snow, Sellers, and Lewis did however win the 2020 Michelin Endurance Cup, setting a record for points accrued that still hasn't been broken. That year, Snow also competed solo for Change Racing in the Lamborghini Super Trofeo North America, claiming the Pro class title while brother McKay won the Pro-Am class alongside other co-driver Corey Lewis.

In 2021, Snow once again teamed up with Sellers in the Lamborghini Huracan GT3, taking their first win at the Long Beach Grand Prix. They stood on the podium seven out of 12 races, and finished second in the championship behind Pfaff Motorsports.

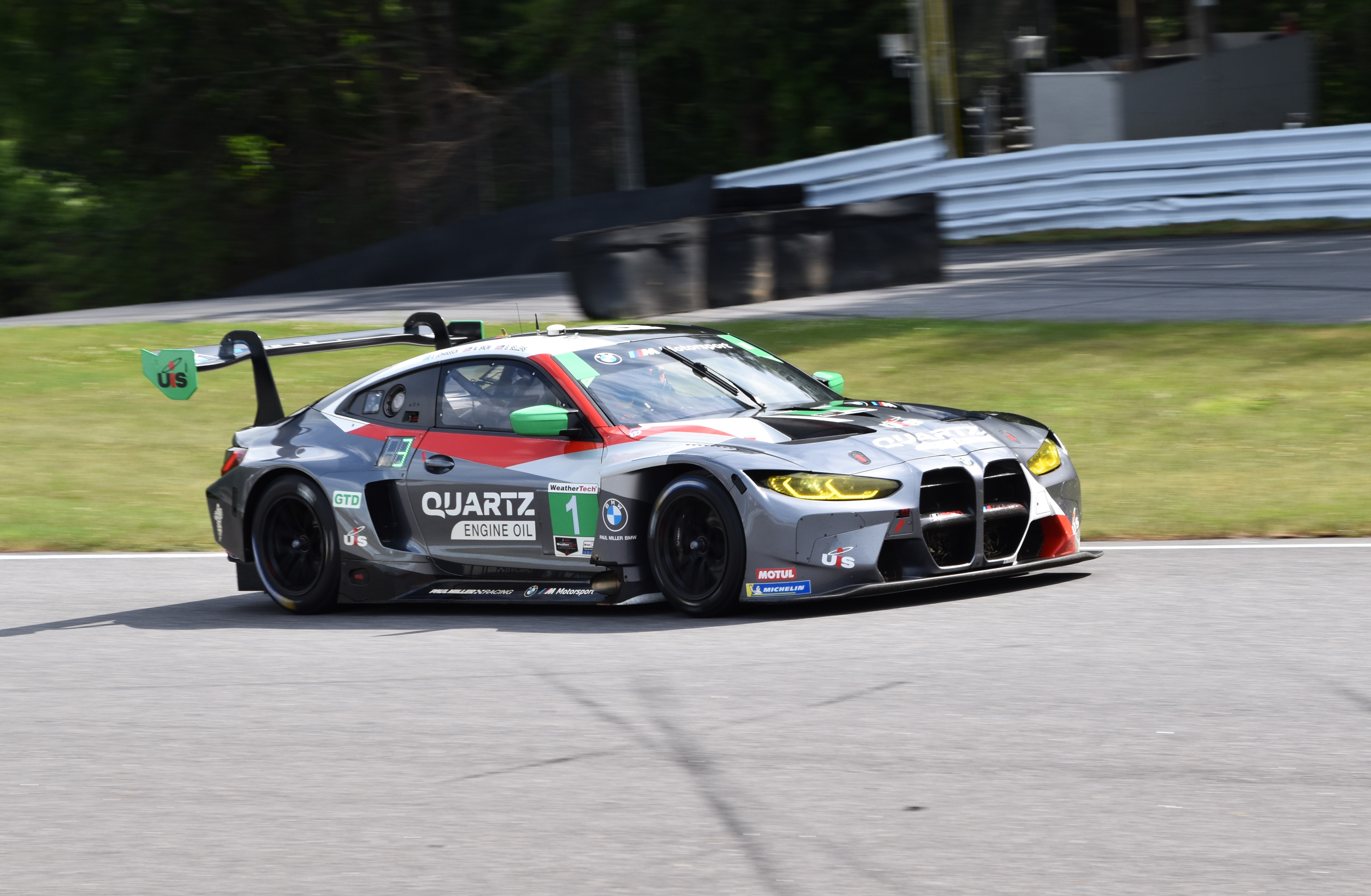
Snow at Lime Rock in 2022

In 2022, Paul Miller Racing switched to BMW from Lamborghini they had been with since 2016. They did not receive their car until after the first race of the season, eliminating them from contention for the full season honors before their first race. They debuted the car at Sebring International Raceway and ran well until contact from a faster class car put them behind the wall for several hours. The defending race winners at Long Beach took pole and victory once again at the southern California event. Snow and Sellers would win in Lime Rock Park once again as well, finishing out the season with top-five finishes at every race except Sebring and Watkins Glen, where they (along with many others) were disqualified. Their average finish in 2022 was the best of the field.

In 2023, Snow continued sharing a race car with Bryan Sellers, tying Wolf Henzler for Seller's longest driving partnership. The duo clinched the championship in record setting fashion, sealing it with still a race to go. They achieved victories at the 2023 12 Hours of Sebring, a third consecutive win at the Long Beach Grand Prix, their first wins at both Canadian Tire Motorsport Park and Road America, as well as win at the site of their first success in 2016, Virginia International Raceway. They also took home their second consecutive Sprint Cup.

The duo clinched the championship in record setting fashion, sealing it with still a race to go. They achieved victories at the 2023 12 Hours of Sebring, a third consecutive win at the Long Beach Grand Prix, their first wins at both Canadian Tire Motorsport Park and Road America, as well as win at the site of their first success in 2016, Virginia International Raceway. They also took home their second consecutive Sprint Cup.

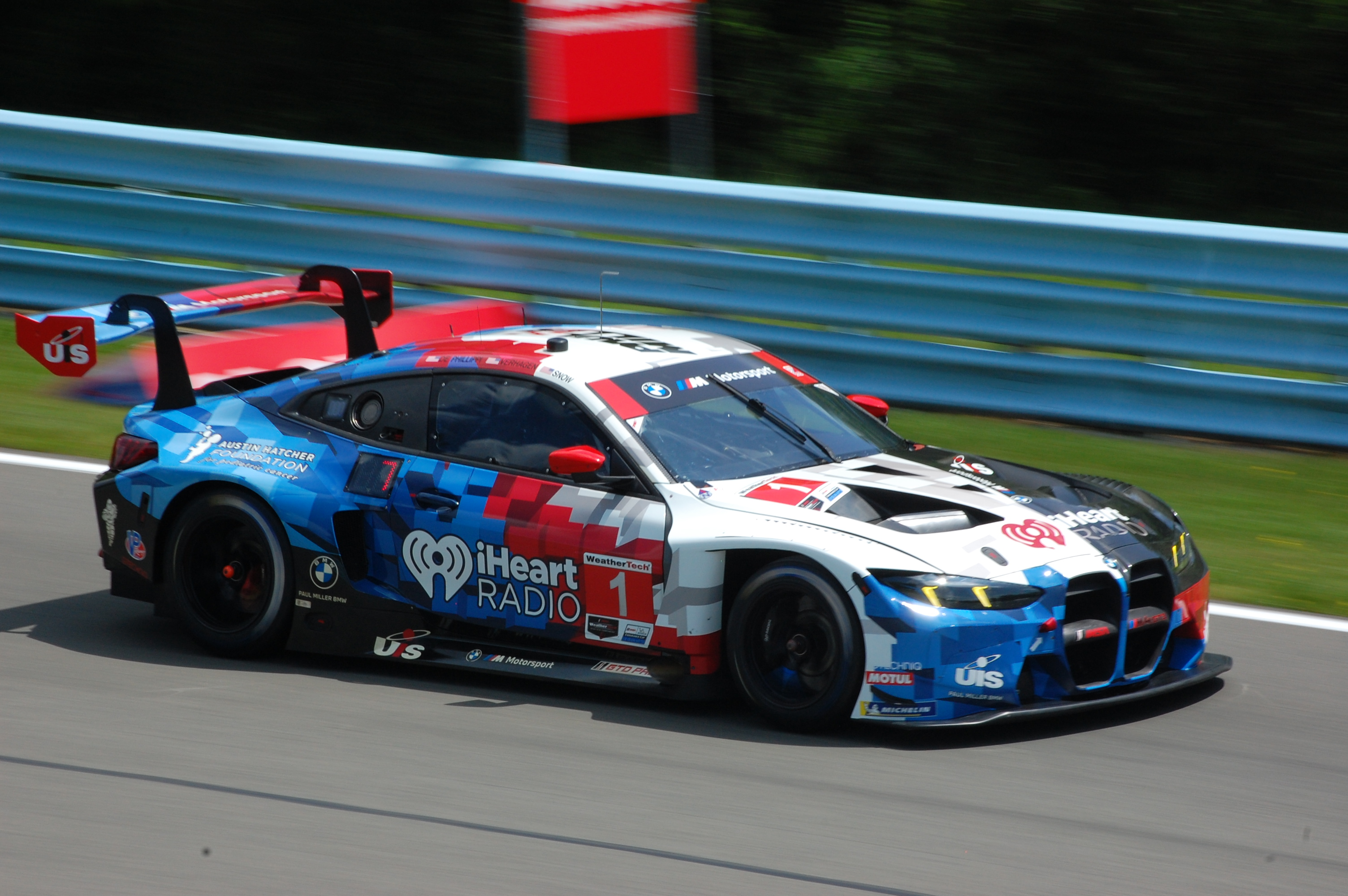
Snow at Watkins Glen in 2025

Ahead of 2024, Snow was added to BMW's factory driver roster, a move which he stated "[opened] doors" for him to expand into programs beyond his role at Paul Miller Racing. The promotion accompanied a step-up to the GTD Pro class. The duo enjoyed a strong start to the season, claiming a podium finish at Daytona, but would have to wait until August's round at Road America to return to the Pro-class podium. The following race at VIR saw Snow take the overall pole, allowing them to jump out early and take their first victory in GTD Pro. Following finishes of eighth and seventh in the final two races of the season, the duo finished fourth in the class championship. The entry, however, scored the GTD Pro class title in the Michelin Endurance Cup.

For 2025, Sellers departed Paul Miller Racing's driver lineup, leaving Snow as the more experienced driver on the roster for the first time in his career. Snow and new co-driver Neil Verhagen scored their first podium finish of the season at the 12 Hours of Sebring in March.

== Personal life ==
Snow comes from a racing family, having grown up at Miller Motorsports Park where his parents both competed. He drove alongside his mother, Melanie, at the 2013 24 Hours of Daytona, and inherited his championship-winning IMSA GT3 Cup Challenge car from his father, Martin.

== Racing record ==
=== Career summary ===
Season	Series	Team	Races	Wins	Poles	F/Laps	Podiums	Points	Position
2011	IMSA GT3 Cup Challenge - Gold Cup	Snow Racing	15	6	6	2	12	262	**1st**
2012	IMSA GT3 Cup Challenge - Platinum Cup	Snow Racing / Wright Motorsports	15	3	5	3	11	223	**2nd**
2012	Pirelli World Challenge - GT		5	0	0	0	0	336	17th
2013	IMSA GT3 Cup Challenge - Platinum Cup	Snow Racing / Wright Motorsports	16	7	11	6	14	264	**1st**
2013	Rolex Sports Car Series - GT	Snow Racing / Wright Motorsports	3	0	0	0	0	66	26th
2013	American Le Mans Series - GTC	TRG	1	0	0	0	0	6	27th
2013	American Le Mans Series - GTC	Flying Lizard Motorsports	1	1	0	0	1	6	27th
2014	United SportsCar Championship - GTD	Snow Racing	11	0	0	0	3	280	7th
2014	Cooper Tires Prototype Lites - L1	Extreme Speed Motorsports	8	0	0	0	0	67	12th
2014	Porsche Supercup	Team Project 1	1	0	0	0	0	0	NC
2015	United SportsCar Championship - GTD	Wright Motorsports	4	0	0	0	1	141	13th
2015	United SportsCar Championship - GTD	Park Place Motorsports	1	1	0	0	1	141	13th
2015	Pirelli World Challenge - GT	GMG Racing	2	0	0	0	0	140	36th
2016	IMSA SportsCar Championship - GTD	Paul Miller Racing	11	1	1	0	3	293	**3rd**
2016	Lamborghini Super Trofeo North America - Pro	DXDT Racing	?	?	?	?	?	?	?
2017	IMSA SportsCar Championship - GTD	Paul Miller Racing	11	0	3	0	2	281	9th
2018	IMSA SportsCar Championship - GTD	Paul Miller Racing	11	2	0	0	8	333	**1st**
2018	Lamborghini Super Trofeo North America - Pro	Change Racing	12	3	0	2	11	142	**1st**
2018	Lamborghini Super Trofeo World Final - Pro	Change Racing	2	0	0	0	0	8	10th
2020	Lamborghini Super Trofeo North America - Pro	Change Racing	10	3	2	2	9	101	**1st**
2020	IMSA SportsCar Championship - GTD	Paul Miller Racing	5	1	0	0	2	126	18th
2021	IMSA SportsCar Championship - GTD	Paul Miller Racing	12	1	3	1	7	3163	**2nd**
2021	GT World Challenge America - Pro/Am	Zelus Motorsports	11	0	0	0	1	90	9th
2021	Lamborghini Super Trofeo North America - Pro	Change Racing	2	1	1	0	2	28	11th
2022	IMSA SportsCar Championship - GTD	Paul Miller Racing	11	2	3	0	5	2679	6th
2022	GT World Challenge America - Pro/Am	Zelus Motorsports	8	0	0	0	0	9	16th
2023	IMSA SportsCar Championship - GTD	Paul Miller Racing	11	5	3	0	7	3482	**1st**
2023	GT World Challenge America - Pro	Wright Motorsports	5	3	2	1	3	120	6th
2023	Intercontinental GT Challenge	Wright Motorsports	1	0	0	0	0	12	23rd
2024	IMSA SportsCar Championship - GTD Pro	Paul Miller Racing	10	1	1	1	3	2929	4th
2024	GT World Challenge America - Pro	Random Vandals Racing	2	0	0	0	0	10	14th
2025	IMSA SportsCar Championship - GTD Pro	Paul Miller Racing	10	1	1	1	2	2794	7th
2026	IMSA SportsCar Championship - GTD	Magnus Racing	1	0	0	0	1	336	57th

^{*} Season still in progress.

=== Complete IMSA SportsCar Championship results ===
(key) (Races in bold indicate pole position)

Year	Team	Class	Make	Engine	1	2	3	4	5	6	7	8	9	10	11	12	Rank	Points	Ref
2014	Snow Racing	GTD	Porsche 911 GT America	Porsche 4.0 L Flat-6	DAY; 3	SEB; 9	LGA; 11	DET; 9	WGL; 13	MOS; 7	IMS; 11	ELK; 3	VIR; 9	COA; 4	PET; 2		7th	280	
2015	Wright Motorsports	GTD	Porsche 911 GT America	Porsche 4.0 L Flat-6	DAY; 3	SEB; 6	LGA	DET; 8	WGL; 8	LIM	ELK	VIR	COA				13th	141	
2015	Park Place Motorsports	GTD	Porsche 911 GT America	Porsche 4.0 L Flat-6										PET; 1			13th	141	
2016	Paul Miller Racing	GTD	Lamborghini Huracán GT3	Lamborghini 5.2 L V10	DAY; 16	SEB; 6	LGA; 7	**DET**; 8	WGL; 12	MOS; 3	LIM; 4	ELK; 8	**VIR**; 1	COA; 2	PET; 4		3rd	293	
2017	Paul Miller Racing	GTD	Lamborghini Huracán GT3	Lamborghini 5.2 L V10	DAY; 7	SEB; 5	**LBH**; 16	COA; 4	DET; 3	WGL; 12	MOS; 8	**LIM**; 2	ELK; 6	VIR; 5	**LGA**; 7	PET; 7	9th	281	
2018	Paul Miller Racing	GTD	Lamborghini Huracán GT3	Lamborghini 5.2 L V10	DAY; 3	SEB; 1	MDO; 3	**DET**; 3	WGL; 3	MOS; 4	LIM; 1	ELK; 2	VIR; 6	LGA; 4	PET; 3		1st	333	
2020	Paul Miller Racing	GTD	Lamborghini Huracán GT3 Evo	Lamborghini 5.2 L V10	DAY; 1	DAY	SEB	ELK	VIR; 14	ATL; 2	MDO	CLT	PET; 7	LGA	SEB; 13		18th	126	
2021	Paul Miller Racing	GTD	Lamborghini Huracán GT3 Evo	Lamborghini 5.2 L V10	DAY; 3	SEB; 11	MDO; 3	DET; 6	WGL; 2	**WGL**; 10	LIM; 2	ELK; 7	LGA; 2	**LBH**; 1	VIR; 2	**PET**; 7	2nd	3163	
2022	Paul Miller Racing	GTD	BMW M4 GT3	BMW S58B30T0 3.0 L Twin-Turbo I6	DAY	SEB; 16	**LBH**; 1	LGA; 4	**MDO**; 2	DET; 3	WGL; 13	MOS; 5	LIM; 1	ELK; 4	VIR; 3	PET; **5**	6th	2679	
2023	Paul Miller Racing	GTD	BMW M4 GT3	BMW S58B30T0 3.0 L Twin-Turbo I6	DAY; 8	SEB; 1	LBH; 1	MON; 10	WGL; 2	MOS; 1	LIM; 8	**ELK**; 1	**VIR**; 1	**IMS**; 3	PET; 18		1st	3482	
2024	Paul Miller Racing	GTD Pro	BMW M4 GT3	BMW S58B30T0 3.0 L Twin-Turbo I6	DAY; 3	SEB; 4	LGA; 7	DET; 5	WGL; 8	MOS; 8	ELK; 2	**VIR**; 1	IMS; 8	PET; 7			4th	2929	
2025	Paul Miller Racing	GTD Pro	BMW M4 GT3 Evo	BMW P58 3.0 L Twin Turbo I6	DAY; 4	SEB; 3	LGA; 10	DET; 11	WGL; 7	**MOS**; 6	ELK; 1	VIR; 6	IMS; 8	PET; 9			7th	2794	
2026	Magnus Racing	GTD	Aston Martin Vantage AMR GT3 Evo	Aston Martin AMR16A 4.0 L Turbo V8	DAY; 2	SEB	LBH	LGA	WGL	MOS	ELK	VIR	IMS	PET			57th	336	

^{*} Season still in progress.

== Notes ==
Sporting positions
Preceded by Richard Antinucci; Corey Lewis	Lamborghini Super Trofeo North America; Pro Champion; 2020	Succeeded by Richard Antinucci
Preceded by Riccardo Agostini; Trent Hindman	Lamborghini Super Trofeo North America; Pro Champion; 2018; With: Corey Lewis	Succeeded by Richard Antinucci; Corey Lewis
Preceded by Alessandro Balzan; Christina Nielsen	IMSA SportsCar Championship; GTD Champion; 2018; With: Bryan Sellers	Succeeded by Mario Farnbacher; Trent Hindman
Preceded by Sean Johnston	IMSA GT3 Cup Challenge; Platinum Champion; 2013	Succeeded by Colin Thompson
Preceded by Henrique Cisneros	IMSA GT3 Cup Challenge; Gold Champion; 2011	Succeeded by Angel Benitez Jr.
