= Steven Thomas (racing driver) =

American racing driver and lawyer

- Thomas at Silverstone Circuit in 2026.
- Nationality: (United States) American
- Born: Steven William Thomas; July 12, 1967 (age 59) East Point, Georgia, U.S.

FIA World Endurance Championship career
- Categorisation: FIA Bronze
- Car number: 45
- Starts: 5
- Wins: 2 (LMP2 Pro/Am)
- Poles: 0
- Fastest laps: 0

Steven William Thomas (born July 12, 1967) is an American attorney at TAFS and amateur racing driver. As a gentleman driver, Thomas has competed in endurance events such as the FIA World Endurance Championship, WeatherTech SportsCar Championship, IMSA Prototype Challenge and Michelin Le Mans Cup.

== Career ==
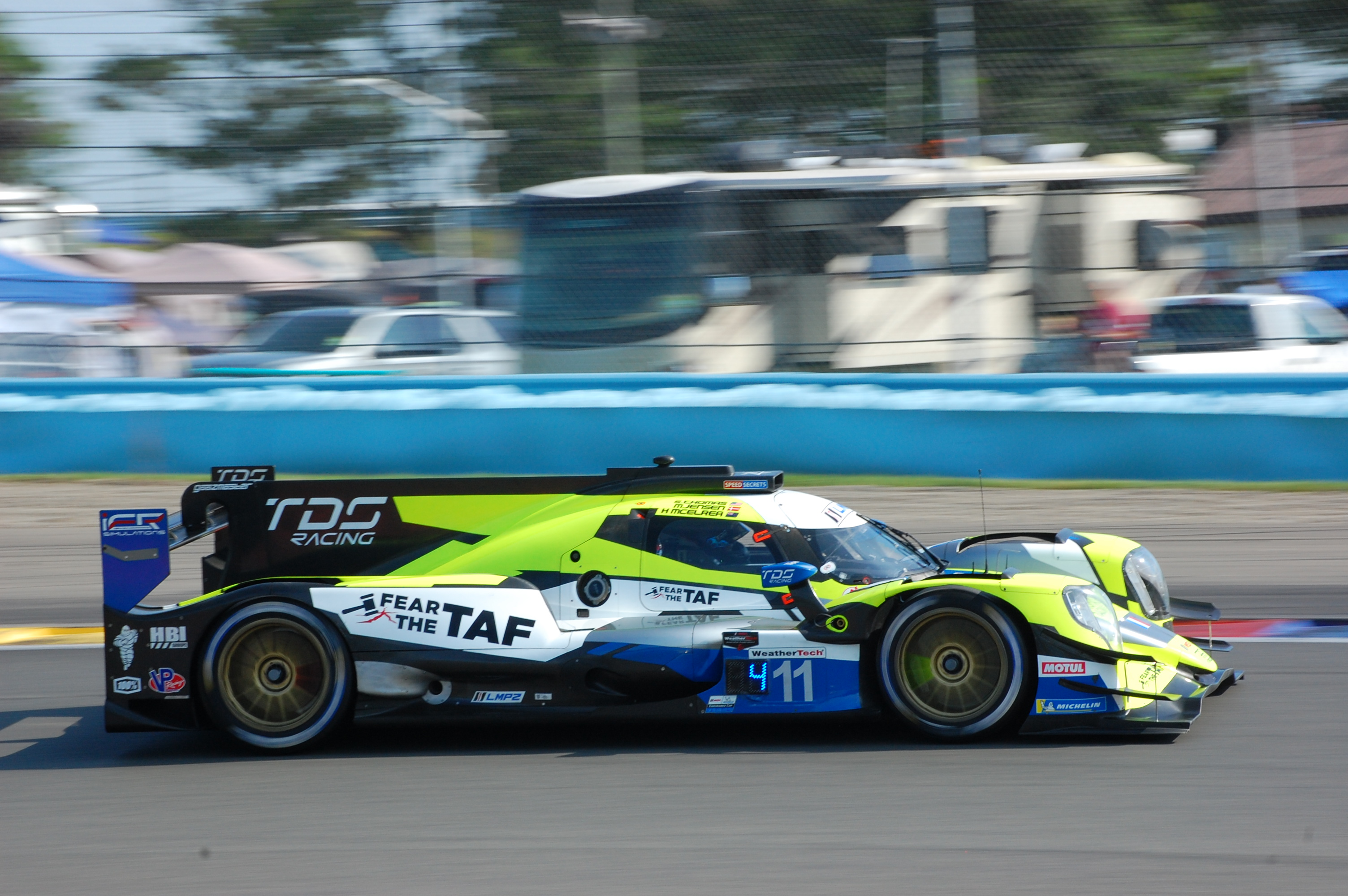
Thomas' Oreca 07 at Watkins Glen in 2025

In 2021, Thomas had entered the WeatherTech SportsCar Championship with his team, WIN Autosport, using an Oreca 07 in the LMP2 category with Tristan Nunez as his team-mate. Thomas Merrill had competed with the crew during endurance races and Matthew Bell for the 24 Hours of Daytona.

In 2022, Thomas continued his commitment to the WeatherTech SportsCar Championship but for that season, he joined the American team PR1/Mathiasen Motorsports to compete in an Oreca 07 in the LMP2 category with team-mate Jonathan Bomarito. Josh Pierson had competed with the crew during endurance races and Harry Tincknell for the 24 Hours of Daytona. At the same time, Thomas was in discussion with various teams to participate in the 24 Hours of Le Mans. One of them, Algarve Pro Racing, who were in a very difficult situation because following the withdrawal of G-Drive Racing from the FIA World Endurance Championship, which it had to support technically, it found itself without a program and its existence was threatened. It was then that Algarve offered Thomas to participate in the WEC instead of only participating in the 24 Hours of Le Mans. In view of the situation and after consulting his partners, Thomas committed himself and participated in the WEC with drivers James Allen and René Binder as teammates. At the 2022 24 Hours of Le Mans, Allen, Binder and Thomas finished first in the LMP2 Pro/Am subclass.

== Racing record ==
=== Complete IMSA SportsCar Championship results ===
(key) (Races in bold indicate pole position; results in italics indicate fastest lap)

Year	Team	Class	Make	Engine	1	2	3	4	5	6	7	Pos.	Points	Ref
2021	WIN Autosport	LMP2	Oreca 07	Gibson GK428 4.2 L V8	DAY; 5†	**SEB**; 4	**WGI**; 1	WGL; 2	ELK; 5	LGA; 3	ATL; 3	2nd	2026	
2022	PR1/Mathiasen Motorsports	LMP2	Oreca 07	Gibson GK428 4.2 L V8	DAY; 7†	SEB; 4	**LGA**; 5	MDO; 2	WGL; 6	**ELK**; 4	**PET**; 3	3rd	1882	
2023	TDS Racing	LMP2	Oreca 07	Gibson GK428 4.2 L V8	DAY; 10†	SEB; 2	LGA; 1	WGL; 7	ELK; 3	IMS; 1	PET; 8	3rd	1942	
2024	TDS Racing	LMP2	Oreca 07	Gibson GK428 4.2 L V8	DAY; 13	SEB; 2	WGL; 9	MOS; 3	ELK; 12	IMS; 1	ATL; 1	4th	2104	
2025	TDS Racing	LMP2	Oreca 07	Gibson GK428 4.2 L V8	DAY; 8	**SEB**; 3	WGL; 11	MOS; 8	**ELK**; 3	IMS; 1	PET; 1	2nd	2154	

^{†} Points only counted towards the Michelin Endurance Cup, and not the overall LMP2 Championship.

=== Complete FIA World Endurance Championship results ===
Year	Entrant	Class	Car	Engine	1	2	3	4	5	6	Rank	Points
2022	Algarve Pro Racing	LMP2 Pro-Am	Oreca 07	Gibson GK428 4.2 L V8	SEB; 3	SPA; 2	LMS; 1	MNZ; 1	FUJ; 3	BHR; 3	2nd	154

^{*} Season still in progress.

=== Complete 24 Hours of Le Mans results ===
Year	Team	Co-Drivers	Car	Class	Laps	Pos.	Class Pos.
2022	(Portugal) Algarve Pro Racing	(Australia) James Allen (Austria) René Binder	Oreca 07-Gibson	LMP2 Pro-Am	363	19th	1st
2023	(Canada) Tower Motorsports	(Germany) René Rast (United States) Ricky Taylor	Oreca 07-Gibson	LMP2	19	DNF	DNF
2023	(Canada) Tower Motorsports	(Germany) René Rast (United States) Ricky Taylor	Oreca 07-Gibson	LMP2 Pro-Am	19	DNF	DNF

=== Complete European Le Mans Series results ===
(key) (Races in bold indicate pole position; results in italics indicate fastest lap)

Year	Entrant	Class	Chassis	Engine	1	2	3	4	5	6	Rank	Points
2026	TDS Racing	LMP2 Pro-Am	Oreca 07	Gibson GK428 4.2 L V8	CAT; 4	LEC; 4	IMO; Ret	SPA; 4	SIL; 1	ALG; 3	2nd	77
