= 2022 Sahlen's Six Hours of The Glen =

Sports car race in New York

The Watkins Glen International

The 2022 Sahlen's Six Hours of The Glen was a sports car race held at Watkins Glen International in Watkins Glen, New York on June 26, 2022. It was the seventh round of the 2022 IMSA SportsCar Championship and the third round of the 2022 Michelin Endurance Cup. The No. 10 WTR - Konica Minolta Acura piloted by Ricky Taylor and Filipe Albuquerque took the victory in DPi. In LMP2, the PR1/Mathiasen Motorsports No. 52 piloted by Ben Keating, Scott Huffaker, and Mikkel Jensen took the victory, while the No. 74 Riley Motorsports entry driven by Gar Robinson, Felipe Fraga, and Kay van Berlo took the victory in LMP3. In GTD Pro, the No. 23 Heart of Racing Team Aston Martin Vantage AMR GT3 piloted by Ross Gunn and Alex Riberas claimed victory after the No. 25 BMW M Team RLL BMW M4 GT3 were penalized post-race. In GTD, the No. 27 Heart of Racing Team Aston Martin Vantage AMR GT3 took the victory with Maxime Martin and Ian James.

== Background ==
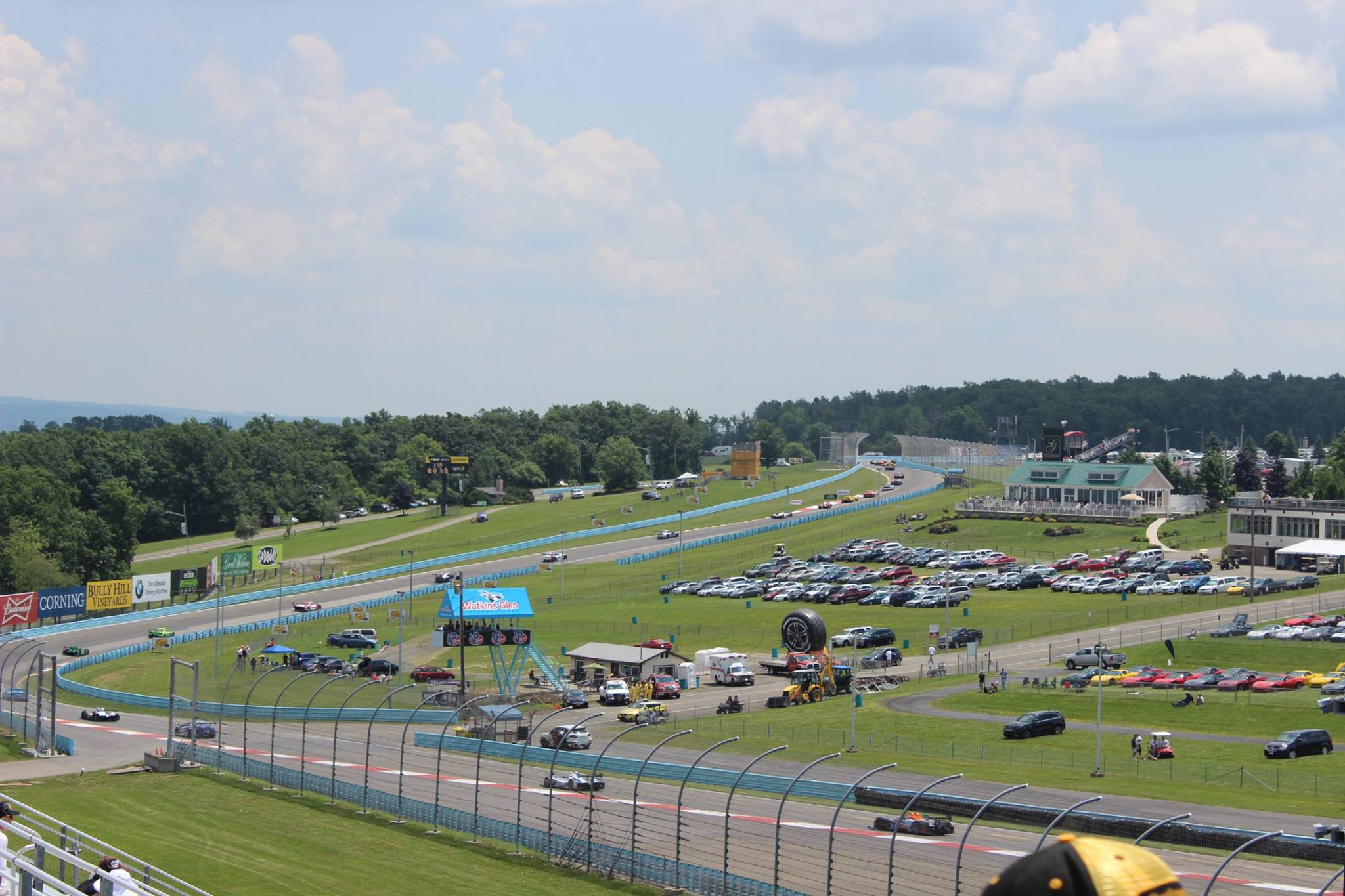
Watkins Glen International, where the race was held.

International Motor Sports Association's (IMSA) president John Doonan confirmed the race was part of the schedule for the 2022 IMSA SportsCar Championship (IMSA SCC) in August 2021. It was the eighth year the event was held as part of the WeatherTech SportsCar Championship. The 2022 Sahlen's Six Hours of The Glen was the seventh of twelve scheduled sports car races of 2022 by IMSA, and it was the third of four rounds held as part of the Michelin Endurance Cup (MEC). The race was held at the eleven-turn 3.450 mi (5.552 km) Watkins Glen International in Watkins Glen, New York on June 26, 2022.

On June 16, 2022, IMSA released the latest technical bulletin outlining Balance of Performance for the event. In DPi, the Acura ARX-05 received a 10 kilogram weight increase while the Cadillac DPi-V.R received a 15 kilogram weight break. In GTD Pro and GTD, the Ferrari 488 GT3 Evo 2020 received a 10 kilogram weight increase and a fuel capacity increase of 3 liters. The Aston Martin Vantage AMR GT3 got a fuel capacity increase of 1 liter while the McLaren 720S GT3 got a fuel capacity reduction of 2 liters.

Before the race, Tom Blomqvist and Oliver Jarvis led the DPi Drivers' Championship with 2027 points, 10 ahead of Filipe Albuquerque and Ricky Taylor. With 972 points, Juan Pablo Montoya and Henrik Hedman led the LMP2 Drivers' Championship by 9 points over Ryan Dalziel and Dwight Merriman followed by Steven Thomas and Jonathan Bomarito with 950 points in third. In LMP3, Garett Grist and Ari Balogh led the Drivers' Championship with 688 points, 27 points clear of Jon Bennett and Colin Braun. With 1345 points, GTD Pro was led by Matt Campbell and Mathieu Jaminet with a 50 point advantage over Antonio García and Jordan Taylor. In GTD, the Drivers' Championship was led by Stevan McAleer with 1520 points; 34 points ahead of Ryan Hardwick and Jan Heylen. Cadillac, Porsche, and BMW were leading their respective Manufacturers' Championships, while Meyer Shank Racing, PR1/Mathiasen Motorsports, Jr III Motorsports, Pfaff Motorsports, and Gilbert Korthoff Motorsports each led their own Teams' Championships.

=== Entries ===
A total of 48 cars took part in the event, split across five classes. 7 were entered in DPi, 7 in LMP2, 11 in LMP3, 7 in GT Daytona Pro, and 17 in GTD. DPi featured the expected addition of the Ally Cadillac Racing No. 48 alongside the six full-season entries in the class. In LMP2, United Autosports were absent due to Jim McGuire having a medical procedure. Sebastián Montoya joined Juan Pablo Montoya, and Hendrick Hedman in the DragonSpeed entry. Racing Team Nederland returned as part of their Endurance Cup campaign. In LMP3, Kyle Marceli replaced Kuno Wittmer in the AWA entry. Nolan Siegel joined Ari Balogh, and Garett Grist in the Jr III Motorsports entry. In GTD Pro, Risi Competizione returned as part of their Endurance Cup campaign. Kyle Kirkwood subbed Jack Hawksworth who was injured, in the Vasser Sullivan Racing No. 14. In GTD, AF Corse, Cetilar Racing, Gradient Racing, Crucial Motorsports, Inception Racing, Team Hardpoint, Magnus Racing, and NTE Sport returned. Winward Racing withdrew its No. 56 entry after the cars steer-by-wire technology did not meet unanimous approval by multiple manufactures competing despite IMSA approving the entry.

== Practice ==
There were two practice sessions preceding the start of the race on Sunday; one on Friday and one on Saturday. The first session on Friday afternoon ran for 90 minutes while the second session on Saturday morning lasted 105 minutes.

== Qualifying ==
Saturday's afternoon qualifying was broken into three sessions, with one session for the DPi and LMP2, LMP3, GTD Pro and GTD classes, which lasted for 15 minutes each, and a ten minute interval between the sessions. The rules dictated that all teams nominated a driver to qualify their cars, with the Pro-Am (LMP2/LMP3/GTD) classes requiring a Bronze/Silver Rated Driver to qualify the car. The competitors' fastest lap times determined the starting order. IMSA then arranged the grid to put DPis ahead of the LMP2, LMP3, GTD Pro, and GTD cars.

=== Qualifying results ===
Pole positions in each class are indicated in bold and by ‡.

Pos.	Class	Position in class	No.	Team	Driver	Time	Gap	Grid
1	**DPi**	**1**	**60**	**(United States) Meyer Shank Racing with Curb-Agajanian**	**(United Kingdom) Tom Blomqvist**	**1:29.580**	-	1‡
2	DPi	2	10	(United States) WTR - Konica Minolta Acura	(Portugal) Filipe Albuquerque	1:29.744	+0.164	2
3	DPi	3	01	(United States) Cadillac Racing	(France) Sébastien Bourdais	1:30.048	+0.468	3
4	DPi	4	02	(United States) Cadillac Racing	(New Zealand) Earl Bamber	1:30.242	+0.662	4
5	DPi	5	31	(United States) Whelen Engineering Racing	(France) Olivier Pla	1:30.500	+0.920	5
6	DPi	6	5	(United States) JDC-Miller MotorSports	(France) Tristan Vautier	1:31.059	+1.479	6
7	**LMP2**	**1**	**52**	**(United States) PR1/Mathiasen Motorsports**	**(United States) Ben Keating**	**1:33.930**	**+4.350**	8‡
8	LMP2	2	11	(United States) PR1/Mathiasen Motorsports	(United States) Steven Thomas	1:33.931	+4.351	9
9	LMP2	3	20	(Denmark) High Class Racing	(Denmark) Dennis Andersen	1:35.448	+5.868	10
10	LMP2	4	29	(Netherlands) Racing Team Nederland	(Netherlands) Frits van Eerd	1:35.778	+6.198	11
11	LMP2	5	8	(United States) Tower Motorsport	(Canada) John Farano	1:35.838	+6.258	12
12	LMP2	6	81	(United States) DragonSpeed USA	(Sweden) Henrik Hedman	1:36.120	+6.540	13
13	LMP2	7	18	(United States) Era Motorsport	(United States) Dwight Merriman	1:37.658	+8.078	14
14	**LMP3**	**1**	**40**	**(United States) FastMD Racing**	**(Argentina) Nicolás Varrone**	**1:40.028**	**+10.448**	15‡
15	LMP3	2	58	(United States) MLT Motorsports	(United States) Josh Sarchet	1:40.590	+11.010	16
16	LMP3	3	54	(United States) CORE Autosport	(United States) Jon Bennett	1:41.288	+11.708	17
17	LMP3	4	36	(United States) Andretti Autosport	(United States) Jarett Andretti	1:41.360	+11.780	25^{1}
18	LMP3	5	38	(United States) Performance Tech Motorsports	(United States) Dan Goldburg	1:41.471	+11.891	18
19	LMP3	6	74	(United States) Riley Motorsports	(United States) Gar Robinson	1:41.481	+11.901	19
20	LMP3	7	7	(United States) Forty7 Motorsports	(Canada) Anthony Mantella	1:42.296	+12.716	20
21	LMP3	8	30	(United States) Jr III Racing	(United States) Ari Balogh	1:42.392	+12.812	21
22	LMP3	9	13	(Canada) AWA	(Canada) Orey Fidani	1:42.886	+13.306	22
23	LMP3	10	6	(Belgium) Mühlner Motorsports America	(United States) Dillon Machavern	1:43.193	+13.613	23
24	**GTD Pro**	**1**	**25**	**(United States) BMW Team RLL**	**(United States) Connor De Phillippi**	**1:44.755**	**+15.175**	26‡
25	GTD Pro	2	23	(United States) Heart of Racing Team	(United Kingdom) Ross Gunn	1:44.803	+15.223	27
26	**GTD**	**1**	**32**	**(United States) Team Korthoff Motorsports**	**(United Kingdom) Stevan McAleer**	**1:45.077**	**+15.497**	28‡
27	GTD Pro	3	62	(United States) Risi Competizione	(Italy) Davide Rigon	1:45.169	+15.589	29
28	GTD Pro	4	14	(United States) Vasser Sullivan Racing	(United Kingdom) Ben Barnicoat	1:45.215	+15.635	30
29	GTD	2	12	(United States) Vasser Sullivan Racing	(United States) Richard Heistand	1:45.417	+15.837	31
30	GTD	3	96	(United States) Turner Motorsport	(United States) Robby Foley	1:45.426	+15.846	32
31	GTD Pro	5	9	(Canada) Pfaff Motorsports	(France) Mathieu Jaminet	1:45.548	+15.968	33
32	GTD	4	57	(United States) Winward Racing	(United States) Russell Ward	1:45.631	+16.051	34
33	GTD	5	1	(United States) Paul Miller Racing	(United States) Madison Snow	1:45.634	+16.054	35
34	GTD	6	42	(United States) NTE Sport/SSR	(United States) Jaden Conwright	1:45.756	+16.176	36
35	GTD	7	16	(United States) Wright Motorsports	(Canada) Zacharie Robichon	1:45.762	+16.182	37
36	GTD	8	47	(Italy) Cetilar Racing	(Italy) Giorgio Sernagiotto	1:45.916	+16.336	38
37	GTD Pro	6	3	(United States) Corvette Racing	(United States) Jordan Taylor	1:46.259	+16.679	39
38	GTD	9	39	(United States) CarBahn with Peregrine Racing	(United States) Robert Megennis	1:46.264	+16.684	40
39	GTD	10	27	(United States) Heart of Racing Team	(United Kingdom) Ian James	1:46.309	+16.729	41
40	GTD Pro	7	79	(United States) WeatherTech Racing	(United States) Cooper MacNeil	1:46.699	+17.119	42
41	GTD	11	70	(United Kingdom) Inception Racing with Optimum Motorsport	(United States) Brendan Iribe	1:46.821	+17.241	43
42	GTD	12	59	(United States) Crucial Motorsports	(United States) Jon Miller	1:46.936	+17.356	44
43	GTD	13	44	(United States) Magnus Racing	(United States) John Potter	1:47.466	+17.886	45
44	GTD	14	21	(Italy) AF Corse	(Argentina) Luís Pérez Companc	1:47.497	+17.917	46
45	DPi	7	48	(United States) Ally Cadillac Racing	(Japan) Kamui Kobayashi	2:17.096	+47.516	7
46	LMP3	11	33	(United States) Sean Creech Motorsport	None	No time	-	24
47	GTD	15	66	(United States) Gradient Racing	None	No time	-	47
48	GTD	16	99	(United States) Team Hardpoint	None	No time	-	48
Sources:

- ^{1} The No. 36 Andretti Autosport entry was moved to the back of the LMP3 field as per Article 40.1.4 of the Sporting regulations (Change of starting tires).

== Race ==
=== Post-Race ===
Filipe Albuquerque and Ricky Taylor retook the lead of the DPi Drivers' Championship while Blomqvist and Jarvis dropped from first to second. The final results of LMP2 meant Farano took the lead of the Drivers' Championship while Hedman and Montoya dropped from first to second. Dalziel and Merriman dropped from second to fourth. The final results of LMP3 meant Bennett and Braun took the lead of theDrivers' Championship while Grist and Balogh dropped from first to second. Robinson and Fraga advanced from sixth to third while Barbosa and Wilsey dropped from third to fourth. The final results of GTD Pro meant Campbell and Jaminet further increased their gap to 98 points as Ben Barnicoat took over second position. The result kept McAleer atop the GTD Drivers' Championship with 1765 points, 5 points ahead of Hardwick and Heylen. Porsche and BMW continued to top their respective Manufacturers' Championships while Acura took the lead of the DPi Manufactures' Championship. PR1/Mathiasen Motorsports, Pfaff Motorsports, and Gilbert Korthoff Motorsports kept their respective advantages in the Teams' Championships. Wayne Taylor Racing and CORE Autosport became the leaders of their respective class Teams' Championships with five rounds remaining.

=== Race results ===
Class winners are denoted in bold and ‡.

Pos	Class	PIC	No	Team	Drivers	Chassis	Laps	Time/Retired
Pos	Class	PIC	No	Team	Drivers	Engine	Laps	Time/Retired
1	**DPi**	**1**	**10**	**(United States) WTR - Konica Minolta Acura**	**(Portugal) Filipe Albuquerque (United States) Ricky Taylor**	**Acura ARX-05**	**162**	**6:10:17.401‡**
1	**DPi**	**1**	**10**	**(United States) WTR - Konica Minolta Acura**	**(Portugal) Filipe Albuquerque (United States) Ricky Taylor**	**Acura AR35TT 3.5 L Turbo V6**	**162**	**6:10:17.401‡**
2	DPi	2	60	(United States) Meyer Shank Racing with Curb-Agajanian	(United Kingdom) Tom Blomqvist (United Kingdom) Oliver Jarvis	Acura ARX-05	162	+0.861
2	DPi	2	60	(United States) Meyer Shank Racing with Curb-Agajanian	(United Kingdom) Tom Blomqvist (United Kingdom) Oliver Jarvis	Acura AR35TT 3.5 L Turbo V6	162	+0.861
3	DPi	3	01	(United States) Cadillac Racing	(France) Sébastien Bourdais (Netherlands) Renger van der Zande	Cadillac DPi-V.R	162	+2.267
3	DPi	3	01	(United States) Cadillac Racing	(France) Sébastien Bourdais (Netherlands) Renger van der Zande	Cadillac 5.5 L V8	162	+2.267
4	DPi	4	02	(United States) Chip Ganassi Racing	(New Zealand) Earl Bamber (United Kingdom) Alex Lynn	Cadillac DPi-V.R	162	+4.176
4	DPi	4	02	(United States) Chip Ganassi Racing	(New Zealand) Earl Bamber (United Kingdom) Alex Lynn	Cadillac 5.5 L V8	162	+4.176
5	DPi	5	31	(United States) Whelen Engineering Racing	(France) Olivier Pla (Brazil) Pipo Derani (United Kingdom) Mike Conway	Cadillac DPi-V.R	162	+4.211
5	DPi	5	31	(United States) Whelen Engineering Racing	(France) Olivier Pla (Brazil) Pipo Derani (United Kingdom) Mike Conway	Cadillac 5.5 L V8	162	+4.211
6	DPi	6	48	(United States) Ally Cadillac Racing	(Japan) Kamui Kobayashi (United States) Jimmie Johnson (Germany) Mike Rockenfeller	Cadillac DPi-V.R	161	+1 Lap
6	DPi	6	48	(United States) Ally Cadillac Racing	(Japan) Kamui Kobayashi (United States) Jimmie Johnson (Germany) Mike Rockenfeller	Cadillac 5.5 L V8	161	+1 Lap
7	DPi	6	5	(United States) JDC-Miller MotorSports	(France) Tristan Vautier; United Kingdom Richard Westbrook (France) Loïc Duval	Cadillac DPi-V.R	160	+2 Laps
7	DPi	6	5	(United States) JDC-Miller MotorSports	(France) Tristan Vautier; United Kingdom Richard Westbrook (France) Loïc Duval	Cadillac 5.5 L V8	160	+2 Laps
8	**LMP2**	**1**	**52**	**(United States) PR1/Mathiasen Motorsports**	**(United States) Ben Keating (Denmark) Mikkel Jensen (United States) Scott Huffaker**	**Oreca 07**	**160**	**+2 Laps‡**
8	**LMP2**	**1**	**52**	**(United States) PR1/Mathiasen Motorsports**	**(United States) Ben Keating (Denmark) Mikkel Jensen (United States) Scott Huffaker**	**Gibson GK428 4.2 L V8**	**160**	**+2 Laps‡**
9	LMP2	2	8	(United States) Tower Motorsport	(Canada) John Farano (Switzerland) Louis Deletraz (Angola) Rui Andrade	Oreca 07	160	+2 Laps
9	LMP2	2	8	(United States) Tower Motorsport	(Canada) John Farano (Switzerland) Louis Deletraz (Angola) Rui Andrade	Gibson GK428 4.2 L V8	160	+2 Laps
10	LMP2	3	29	(Netherlands) Racing Team Nederland	(Netherlands) Frits van Eerd (Netherlands) Giedo van der Garde (United States) Dylan Murry	Oreca 07	160	+2 Laps
10	LMP2	3	29	(Netherlands) Racing Team Nederland	(Netherlands) Frits van Eerd (Netherlands) Giedo van der Garde (United States) Dylan Murry	Gibson GK428 4.2 L V8	160	+2 Laps
11	LMP2	4	20	(Denmark) High Class Racing	(Denmark) Dennis Andersen (Denmark) Anders Fjordbach (Switzerland) Fabio Scherer	Oreca 07	160	+2 Laps
11	LMP2	4	20	(Denmark) High Class Racing	(Denmark) Dennis Andersen (Denmark) Anders Fjordbach (Switzerland) Fabio Scherer	Gibson GK428 4.2 L V8	160	+2 Laps
12	LMP2	5	81	(United States) DragonSpeed - 10 Star	(Sweden) Henrik Hedman (Colombia) Juan Pablo Montoya (Colombia) Sebastián Montoya	Oreca 07	159	+3 Laps
12	LMP2	5	81	(United States) DragonSpeed - 10 Star	(Sweden) Henrik Hedman (Colombia) Juan Pablo Montoya (Colombia) Sebastián Montoya	Gibson GK428 4.2 L V8	159	+3 Laps
13	LMP2	6	11	(United States) PR1/Mathiasen Motorsports	(United States) Steven Thomas (United States) Jonathan Bomarito (United States) Josh Pierson	Oreca 07	159	+3 Laps
13	LMP2	6	11	(United States) PR1/Mathiasen Motorsports	(United States) Steven Thomas (United States) Jonathan Bomarito (United States) Josh Pierson	Gibson GK428 4.2 L V8	159	+3 Laps
14	LMP2	7	18	(United States) Era Motorsport	(United States) Dwight Merriman (United Kingdom) Ryan Dalziel (United Kingdom) Kyle Tilley	Oreca 07	158	+4 Laps
14	LMP2	7	18	(United States) Era Motorsport	(United States) Dwight Merriman (United Kingdom) Ryan Dalziel (United Kingdom) Kyle Tilley	Gibson GK428 4.2 L V8	158	+4 Laps
15	**LMP3**	**1**	**74**	**(United States) Riley Motorsports**	**(United States) Gar Robinson (Brazil) Felipe Fraga (Netherlands) Kay van Berlo**	**Ligier JS P320**	**154**	**+8 Laps‡**
15	**LMP3**	**1**	**74**	**(United States) Riley Motorsports**	**(United States) Gar Robinson (Brazil) Felipe Fraga (Netherlands) Kay van Berlo**	**Nissan VK56DE 5.6 L V8**	**154**	**+8 Laps‡**
16	LMP3	2	54	(United States) CORE Autosport	(United States) Jon Bennett (United States) Colin Braun (United States) George Kurtz	Ligier JS P320	153	+9 Laps
16	LMP3	2	54	(United States) CORE Autosport	(United States) Jon Bennett (United States) Colin Braun (United States) George Kurtz	Nissan VK56DE 5.6 L V8	153	+9 Laps
17	LMP3	3	38	(United States) Performance Tech Motorsports	(United States) Dan Goldburg (Sweden) Rasmus Lindh (Australia) Cameron Shields	Ligier JS P320	153	+9 Laps
17	LMP3	3	38	(United States) Performance Tech Motorsports	(United States) Dan Goldburg (Sweden) Rasmus Lindh (Australia) Cameron Shields	Nissan VK56DE 5.6 L V8	153	+9 Laps
18	LMP3	4	40	(United States) FastMD Racing	(Argentina) Nicolás Varrone (United States) Max Hanratty (Canada) James Vance	Ligier JS P320	151	+11 Laps
18	LMP3	4	40	(United States) FastMD Racing	(Argentina) Nicolás Varrone (United States) Max Hanratty (Canada) James Vance	Nissan VK56DE 5.6 L V8	151	+11 Laps
19	**GTD**	**1**	**27**	**(United States) Heart of Racing Team**	**(United Kingdom) Roman De Angelis (Belgium) Maxime Martin (United Kingdom) Ian James**	**Aston Martin Vantage AMR GT3**	**148**	**+14 Laps‡**
19	**GTD**	**1**	**27**	**(United States) Heart of Racing Team**	**(United Kingdom) Roman De Angelis (Belgium) Maxime Martin (United Kingdom) Ian James**	**Aston Martin 4.0 L Turbo V8**	**148**	**+14 Laps‡**
20	GTD	2	70	(United Kingdom) Inception Racing	(United States) Brendan Iribe (South Africa) Jordan Pepper (United Kingdom) Ollie Millroy	McLaren 720S GT3	147	+15 Laps
20	GTD	2	70	(United Kingdom) Inception Racing	(United States) Brendan Iribe (South Africa) Jordan Pepper (United Kingdom) Ollie Millroy	McLaren M840T 4.0 L Turbo V8	147	+15 Laps
21	**GTD Pro**	**1**	**23**	**(United States) Heart of Racing Team**	**(United Kingdom) Ross Gunn (Spain) Alex Riberas**	**Aston Martin Vantage AMR GT3**	**147**	**+15 Laps‡**
21	**GTD Pro**	**1**	**23**	**(United States) Heart of Racing Team**	**(United Kingdom) Ross Gunn (Spain) Alex Riberas**	**Aston Martin 4.0 L Turbo V8**	**147**	**+15 Laps‡**
22	GTD	3	96	(United States) Turner Motorsport	(United States) Robby Foley (United States) Bill Auberlen (United States) Michael Dinan	BMW M4 GT3	147	+15 Laps
22	GTD	3	96	(United States) Turner Motorsport	(United States) Robby Foley (United States) Bill Auberlen (United States) Michael Dinan	BMW S58B30T0 3.0 L Twin Turbo I6	147	+15 Laps
23	GTD	4	47	(Italy) Cetilar Racing	(Italy) Giorgio Sernagiotto (Italy) Antonio Fuoco (Italy) Roberto Lacorte	Ferrari 488 GT3 Evo 2020	147	+15 Laps
23	GTD	4	47	(Italy) Cetilar Racing	(Italy) Giorgio Sernagiotto (Italy) Antonio Fuoco (Italy) Roberto Lacorte	Ferrari F154CB 3.9 L Turbo V8	147	+15 Laps
24	GTD Pro	2	62	(United States) Risi Competizione	(Italy) Davide Rigon (Brazil) Daniel Serra	Ferrari 488 GT3 Evo 2020	147	+15 Laps
24	GTD Pro	2	62	(United States) Risi Competizione	(Italy) Davide Rigon (Brazil) Daniel Serra	Ferrari F154CB 3.9 L Turbo V8	147	+15 Laps
25	GTD	5	44	(United States) Magnus Racing	(United States) John Potter (United States) Andy Lally (United States) Spencer Pumpelly	Aston Martin Vantage AMR GT3	147	+15 Laps
25	GTD	5	44	(United States) Magnus Racing	(United States) John Potter (United States) Andy Lally (United States) Spencer Pumpelly	Aston Martin 4.0 L Turbo V8	147	+15 Laps
26	GTD Pro	3	9	(Canada) Pfaff Motorsports	(France) Mathieu Jaminet (Australia) Matt Campbell	Porsche 911 GT3 R	147	+15 Laps
26	GTD Pro	3	9	(Canada) Pfaff Motorsports	(France) Mathieu Jaminet (Australia) Matt Campbell	Porsche 4.0 L Flat-6	147	+15 Laps
27	GTD Pro	4	14	(United States) Vasser Sullivan Racing	(United Kingdom) Ben Barnicoat (United States) Kyle Kirkwood	Lexus RC F GT3	147	+15 Laps
27	GTD Pro	4	14	(United States) Vasser Sullivan Racing	(United Kingdom) Ben Barnicoat (United States) Kyle Kirkwood	Toyota 2UR 5.0 L V8	147	+15 Laps
28	GTD Pro	5	79	(United States) WeatherTech Racing	(United States) Cooper MacNeil (Canada) Mikaël Grenier (Germany) Maro Engel	Mercedes-AMG GT3 Evo	147	+15 laps
28	GTD Pro	5	79	(United States) WeatherTech Racing	(United States) Cooper MacNeil (Canada) Mikaël Grenier (Germany) Maro Engel	Mercedes-AMG M159 6.2 L V8	147	+15 laps
29	GTD Pro	6	3	(United States) Corvette Racing	(United States) Jordan Taylor (Spain) Antonio Garcia	Chevrolet Corvette C8.R GTD	147	+15 Laps
29	GTD Pro	6	3	(United States) Corvette Racing	(United States) Jordan Taylor (Spain) Antonio Garcia	Chevrolet 5.5 L V8	147	+15 Laps
30	GTD Pro	7	25	(United States) BMW M Team RLL*	(United States) Connor De Phillippi (United States) John Edwards (Brazil) Augusto Farfus	BMW M4 GT3	148	+14 Laps
30	GTD Pro	7	25	(United States) BMW M Team RLL*	(United States) Connor De Phillippi (United States) John Edwards (Brazil) Augusto Farfus	BMW S58B30T0 3.0 L Twin Turbo I6	148	+14 Laps
31	GTD	6	16	(United States) Wright Motorsports	(Canada) Zacharie Robichon (United States) Ryan Hardwick (Belgium) Jan Heylen	Porsche 911 GT3 R	146	+16 Laps
31	GTD	6	16	(United States) Wright Motorsports	(Canada) Zacharie Robichon (United States) Ryan Hardwick (Belgium) Jan Heylen	Porsche 4.0 L Flat-6	146	+16 Laps
32	LMP3	5	33	(United States) Sean Creech Motorsport	(United States) Lance Willsey (Portugal) João Barbosa (Denmark) Malte Jakobsen	Ligier JS P320	132	+30 Laps
32	LMP3	5	33	(United States) Sean Creech Motorsport	(United States) Lance Willsey (Portugal) João Barbosa (Denmark) Malte Jakobsen	Nissan VK56DE 5.6 L V8	132	+30 Laps
33 DNF	GTD	7	39	(United States) CarBahn with Peregrine Racing	(United States) Robert Megennis (United States) Jeff Westphal (United States) Corey Lewis	Lamborghini Huracán GT3 Evo	129	Not Running
33 DNF	GTD	7	39	(United States) CarBahn with Peregrine Racing	(United States) Robert Megennis (United States) Jeff Westphal (United States) Corey Lewis	Lamborghini 5.2 L V10	129	Not Running
34 DNF	LMP3	6	30	(United States) Jr III Motorsports	(United States) Ari Balogh (Canada) Garett Grist (United States) Nolan Siegel	Ligier JS P320	126	Not Running
34 DNF	LMP3	6	30	(United States) Jr III Motorsports	(United States) Ari Balogh (Canada) Garett Grist (United States) Nolan Siegel	Nissan VK56DE 5.6 L V8	126	Not Running
35 DNF	LMP3	7	58	(United States) MLT Motorsports	(United States) Josh Sarchet (United States) Dakota Dickerson (United States) Tyler Maxson	Ligier JS P320	108	Not Running
35 DNF	LMP3	7	58	(United States) MLT Motorsports	(United States) Josh Sarchet (United States) Dakota Dickerson (United States) Tyler Maxson	Nissan VK56DE 5.6 L V8	108	Not Running
36 DNF	GTD	8	21	(Italy) AF Corse	(Argentina) Luís Pérez Companc (United Kingdom) Simon Mann (Finland) Toni Vilander	Ferrari 488 GT3 Evo 2020	76	Not Running
36 DNF	GTD	8	21	(Italy) AF Corse	(Argentina) Luís Pérez Companc (United Kingdom) Simon Mann (Finland) Toni Vilander	Ferrari F154CB 3.9 L Turbo V8	76	Not Running
37 DNF	LMP3	8	7	(United States) Forty7 Motorsports	(Canada) Anthony Mantella (United Kingdom) Matt Bell (United Kingdom) Wayne Boyd	Ligier JS P320	67	Not Running
37 DNF	LMP3	8	7	(United States) Forty7 Motorsports	(Canada) Anthony Mantella (United Kingdom) Matt Bell (United Kingdom) Wayne Boyd	Nissan VK56DE 5.6 L V8	67	Not Running
38 DNF	GTD	9	66	(United States) Gradient Racing	(United Kingdom) Till Bechtolsheimer (Germany) Mario Farnbacher (Barbados) Kyffin Simpson	Acura NSX GT3 Evo22	44	Not Running
38 DNF	GTD	9	66	(United States) Gradient Racing	(United Kingdom) Till Bechtolsheimer (Germany) Mario Farnbacher (Barbados) Kyffin Simpson	Acura 3.5 L Turbo V6	44	Not Running
39	GTD	5	32	(United States) Team Korthoff Motorsports*	(United Kingdom) Stevan McAleer (Germany) Dirk Muller (United States) Mike Skeen	Mercedes-AMG GT3 Evo	138	+24 Laps
39	GTD	5	32	(United States) Team Korthoff Motorsports*	(United Kingdom) Stevan McAleer (Germany) Dirk Muller (United States) Mike Skeen	Mercedes-AMG M159 6.2 L V8	138	+24 Laps
40	GTD	11	57	(United Kingdom) Winward Racing*	(United States) Russell Ward (United Kingdom) Philip Ellis (Germany) Marvin Dienst	Mercedes-AMG GT3 Evo	148	+14 Laps
40	GTD	11	57	(United Kingdom) Winward Racing*	(United States) Russell Ward (United Kingdom) Philip Ellis (Germany) Marvin Dienst	Mercedes-AMG M159 6.2 L V8	148	+14 Laps
41	GTD	12	42	(United States) NTE Sport/SSR*	(United States) Don Yount (Germany) Marco Holzer (United States) Jaden Conwright	Lamborghini Huracán GT3 Evo	147	+15 Laps
41	GTD	12	42	(United States) NTE Sport/SSR*	(United States) Don Yount (Germany) Marco Holzer (United States) Jaden Conwright	Lamborghini 5.2 L V10	147	+15 Laps
42 DNF	GTD	13	1	(United States) Paul Miller Racing*	(United States) Madison Snow (United States) Bryan Sellers (Sweden) Erik Johansson	BMW M4 GT3	144	Not Running
42 DNF	GTD	13	1	(United States) Paul Miller Racing*	(United States) Madison Snow (United States) Bryan Sellers (Sweden) Erik Johansson	BMW S58B30T0 3.0 L Twin Turbo I6	144	Not Running
43	GTD	14	99	(United States) Team Hardpoint*	(United Kingdom) Stefan Wilson (United States) Rob Ferriol (United Kingdom) Katherine Legge	Porsche 911 GT3 R	145	+17 Laps
43	GTD	14	99	(United States) Team Hardpoint*	(United Kingdom) Stefan Wilson (United States) Rob Ferriol (United Kingdom) Katherine Legge	Porsche 4.0 L Flat-6	145	+17 Laps
44	GTD	15	59	(United States) Crucial Motorsports*	(United States) Jon Miller (United States) Patrick Gallagher (United States) Paul Holton	McLaren 720S GT3	146	+16 Laps
44	GTD	15	59	(United States) Crucial Motorsports*	(United States) Jon Miller (United States) Patrick Gallagher (United States) Paul Holton	McLaren M840T 4.0 L Turbo V8	146	+16 Laps
45	GTD	16	12	(United States) Vasser Sullivan Racing*	(United States) Richard Heistand (United States) Frankie Montecalvo (United States) Aaron Telitz	Lexus RC F GT3	147	+15 Laps
45	GTD	16	12	(United States) Vasser Sullivan Racing*	(United States) Richard Heistand (United States) Frankie Montecalvo (United States) Aaron Telitz	Toyota 2UR 5.0 L V8	147	+15 Laps
46 DNF	LMP3	9	13	(Canada) AWA	(Canada) Orey Fidani (Germany) Lars Kern (Canada) Kyle Marcelli	Duqueine M30 - D08	43	Not Running
46 DNF	LMP3	9	13	(Canada) AWA	(Canada) Orey Fidani (Germany) Lars Kern (Canada) Kyle Marcelli	Nissan VK56DE 5.6 L V8	43	Not Running
47 DNF	LMP3	10	6	(Belgium) Mühlner Motorsports America	(United States) Dillon Machavern (Costa Rica) Danny Formal (Belgium) Ugo de Wilde	Duqueine M30 - D08	35	Not Running
47 DNF	LMP3	10	6	(Belgium) Mühlner Motorsports America	(United States) Dillon Machavern (Costa Rica) Danny Formal (Belgium) Ugo de Wilde	Nissan VK56DE 5.6 L V8	35	Not Running
48	LMP3	11	36	(United States) Andretti Autosport*	(United States) Jarett Andretti (Colombia) Gabby Chaves (Australia) Josh Burdon	Ligier JS P320	153	+9 Laps
48	LMP3	11	36	(United States) Andretti Autosport*	(United States) Jarett Andretti (Colombia) Gabby Chaves (Australia) Josh Burdon	Nissan VK56DE 5.6 L V8	153	+9 Laps
Sources:

- Penalized for not meeting the minimum drive time

== Standings after the race ==
DPi Drivers' Championship standings
Pos.	+/–	Driver	Points
1	1	(Portugal) Filipe Albuquerque (United States) Ricky Taylor	2399
2	1	(United Kingdom) Tom Blomqvist (United Kingdom) Oliver Jarvis	2382
3		(United Kingdom) Alex Lynn (New Zealand) Earl Bamber	2239
4		(France) Sébastien Bourdais (Netherlands) Renger van der Zande	2214
5	1	(Brazil) Pipo Derani	2137

LMP2 Drivers' Championship standings
Pos.	+/–	Driver	Points
1	1	(Canada) John Farano	1294
2	1	(Colombia) Juan Pablo Montoya (Sweden) Henrik Hedman	1257
3		(United States) Steven Thomas (United States) Jonathan Bomarito	1232
4	2	(United Kingdom) Ryan Dalziel (United States) Dwight Merriman	1227
5	1	(Denmark) Dennis Andersen (Denmark) Anders Fjordbach	1188

LMP3 Drivers' Championship standings
Pos.	+/–	Driver	Points
1	1	(United States) Jon Bennett (United States) Colin Braun	1011
2	1	(Canada) Garett Grist (United States) Ari Balogh	961
3	3	(United States) Gar Robinson (Brazil) Felipe Fraga	958
4	1	(Portugal) João Barbosa (United States) Lance Willsey	927
5		(United States) Daniel Goldburg (Sweden) Rasmus Lindh	922

GTD Pro Drivers' Championship standings
Pos.	+/–	Driver	Points
1		(Australia) Matt Campbell (France) Mathieu Jaminet	1671
2	1	(United Kingdom) Ben Barnicoat	1573
3	1	(Spain) Antonio García (United States) Jordan Taylor	1570
4	1	(United Kingdom) Ross Gunn (Spain) Alex Riberas	1488
5	1	(United States) Cooper MacNeil	1396

GTD Drivers' Championship standings
Pos.	+/–	Driver	Points
1		(United Kingdom) Stevan McAleer	1765
2		(United States) Ryan Hardwick (Belgium) Jan Heylen	1760
3		(United States) Bill Auberlen (United States) Robby Foley	1721
4	1	(Canada) Roman De Angelis	1660
5	1	(United States) Robert Megennis (United States) Jeff Westphal	1549

- Note: Only the top five positions are included for all sets of standings.

DPi Teams' Championship standings
Pos.	+/–	Team	Points
1	1	(United States) #10 WTR - Konica Minolta Acura	2399
2	1	(United States) #60 Meyer Shank Racing w/ Curb-Agajanian	2382
3		(United States) #02 Cadillac Racing	2239
4		(United States) #01 Cadillac Racing	2214
5	1	(United States) #31 Whelen Engineering Racing	2137

LMP2 Teams' Championship standings
Pos.	+/–	Team	Points
1		(United States) #52 PR1/Mathiasen Motorsports	1367
2	3	(United States) #8 Tower Motorsport	1294
3	1	(United States) #81 DragonSpeed USA	1257
4		(United States) #11 PR1/Mathiasen Motorsports	1232
5	2	(United States) #18 Era Motorsport	1227

LMP3 Teams' Championship standings
Pos.	+/–	Team	Points
1	1	(United States) #54 CORE Autosport	688
2	1	(United States) #30 Jr III Motorsports	661
3	2	(United States) #74 Riley Motorsports	647
4	1	(United States) #33 Sean Creech Motorsport	596
5	1	(United States) #38 Performance Tech Motorsports	583

GTD Pro Teams' Championship standings
Pos.	+/–	Team	Points
1		(Canada) #9 Pfaff Motorsports	1671
2	1	(United States) #14 Vasser Sullivan Racing	1573
3	1	(United States) #3 Corvette Racing	1570
4	1	(United States) #23 Heart of Racing Team	1488
5	1	(United States) #79 WeatherTech Racing	1396

GTD Teams' Championship standings
Pos.	+/–	Team	Points
1		(United States) #32 Gilbert Korthoff Motorsports	1765
2		(United States) #16 Wright Motorsports	1760
3		(United States) #96 Turner Motorsport	1721
4	1	(United States) #27 Heart of Racing Team	1660
5	1	(United States) #39 CarBahn with Peregrine Racing	1549

- Note: Only the top five positions are included for all sets of standings.

DPi Manufacturers' Championship standings
Pos.	+/–	Manufacturer	Points
1	1	(Japan) Acura	2593
2	1	(United States) Cadillac	2566

GTD Pro Manufacturers' Championship standings
Pos.	+/–	Manufacturer	Points
1		(Germany) Porsche	1671
2	1	(Japan) Lexus	1603
3	1	(United States) Chevrolet	1580
4	2	(United Kingdom) Aston Martin	1558
5	1	(Germany) Mercedes-AMG	1504

GTD Manufacturers' Championship standings
Pos.	+/–	Manufacturer	Points
1		(Germany) BMW	1949
2	2	(United Kingdom) Aston Martin	1931
3	1	(Germany) Mercedes-AMG	1880
4	1	(Germany) Porsche	1857
5		(Japan) Lexus	1769

- Note: Only the top five positions are included for all sets of standings.

IMSA SportsCar Championship
Previous race: Chevrolet Detroit Grand Prix	2022 season	Next race: 2022 Chevrolet Grand Prix
