= Štefan Rosina =

Slovak racing driver (born 1987)

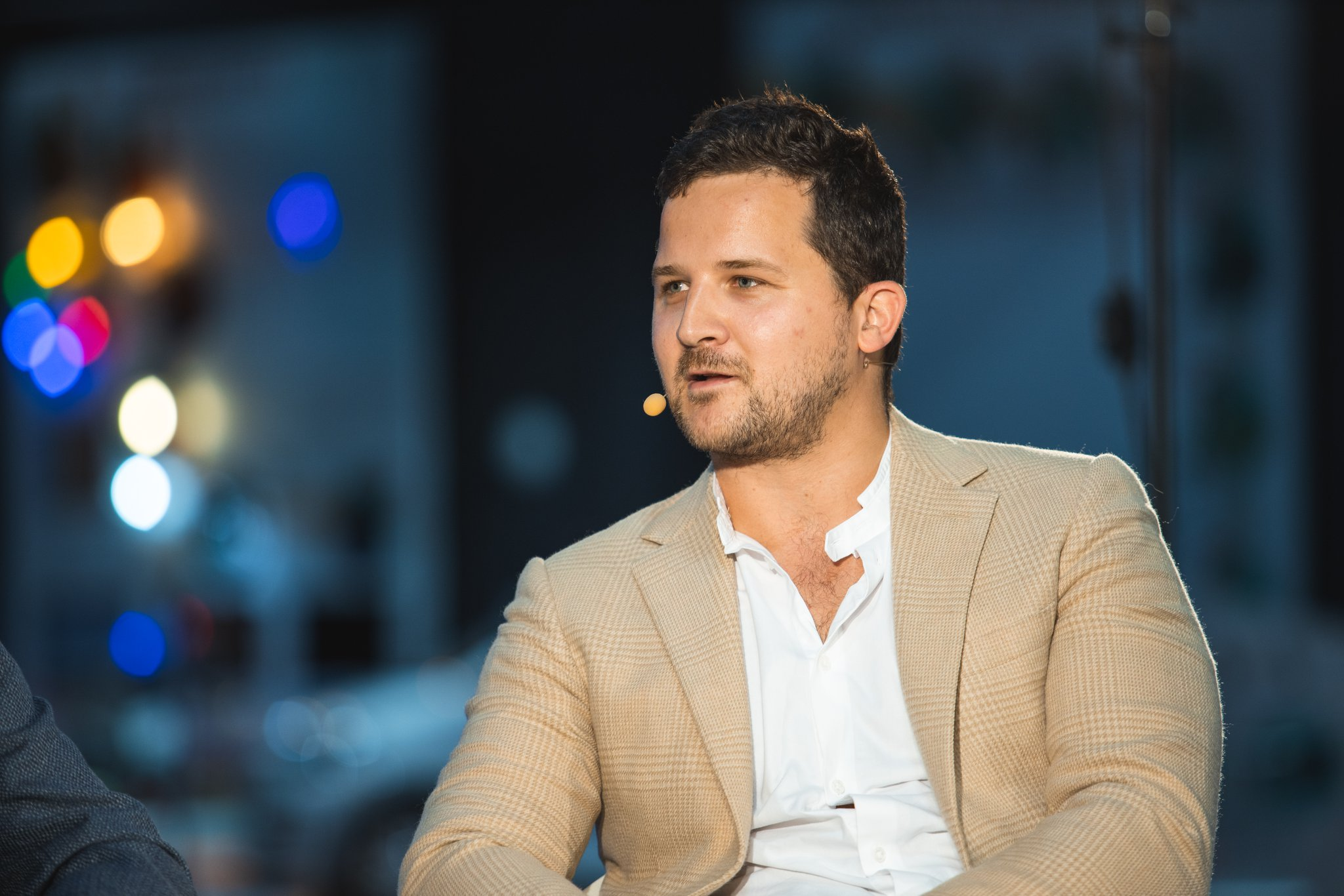
- Rosina in 2024
- Nationality: (Slovakia) Slovak
- Born: 15 July 1987 (age 39) Púchov, Czechoslovakia

FIA GT Series career
- Current team: Mičánek Motorsport Powered by Buggyra
- Categorisation: FIA Gold (until 2021); FIA Silver (2022–)
- Car number: 11
- Former teams: VERVA Racing Team, Walter Lechner Racing, KTM True Racing

Štefan "Štofi" Rosina (born 15 July 1987 in Púchov) is a Slovak racing driver and businessman. He is a race winner in the FIA GT1 World Championship, a former champion in the Lamborghini Super Trofeo Europe series’ Pro-Am category, and the current GT2 European Series champion.

== Early motorsport career and domestic success ==
Rosina's start in motorsport came in junior karting formulae where he was vice-champion in the Czech national championships at 13 years old. After a season in Ford Fiesta cup, at 15 years old, Rosina started in the Skoda Octavia Cup one-make series (then known as the Česká Pojišťovna Škoda Octavia Cup). He was champion in 2003 and 2004. The first of his two titles was to come in the series finale in somewhat controversial circumstances. Series leader and reigning champion František Došek crashed at the start, failing to recover in the race and losing the championship.

== International sportscar debut and first points ==
After contesting three races of the 2005 FIA GT Championship for Slovak outfit ARC Bratislava, Rosina returned in 2006 for eight races of the series. Despite DNFs in three races, Rosina won his first points at elite level in each of his last three finishes, at Paul Ricard, Dijon and Mugello.

== 2007-2011 Porsche Supercup ==
In 2007, Rosina entered the Porsche Supercup one-make series with the late Walter Lechner's Lechner Racing team. Supercup is a recognised training ground for future GT and DTM stars. Le Mans winner Stéphane Ortelli, triple DTM Champion Rene Rast (against whom Rosina would compete) and German touring car legend Uwe Alzen, and notable Dutch Sportscar pilot Patrick Huisman are all graduates of the series. Winning points in his rookie season, he would score two podiums the following year, the second at a torrential Silverstone, during which he memorably led the race from eventual winner Sean Edwards. In 2009, his third season in Supercup, Rosina would be rewarded for consistency, with no retirements and an international career best third in the championship, narrowly ahead of four time Supercup champion Huisman.

2010 was to be less successful, a second-place finish in the season opener in Bahrain the highlight of a season that saw Rosina finish eighth in the standings. A move to new team Verva Racing for 2011 yielded little more success and the young Slovak moved on.

== 2011-2013 Lamborghini Reiter works drive ==
In 2011, without a full season race seat, Rosina appeared in four rounds of the FIA GT3 European Championship, scoring an unfancied pole position at his home circuit the Slovakiaring in a guest drive for the Lamborghini customer team Leipert Engineering team, ahead of Lamborghini works entry Reiter Engineering's own entrants. Despite a DNF early in the race due to a puncture, his performance was enough to earn a factory drive for Reiter the following season, as halfway through 2012, Reiter brought Rosina to replace ex-Formula 1 and Le Mans GT class winner Tomas Enge in the FIA GT1 World Championship alongside former Formula 3000 champion and Le Mans class winner Peter Kox. The highlights of this shortened season for Rosina were a win and a podium at each of two Nurburgring races, and a fourth place and strong second at Donington.

2013 saw Rosina compete in just six races at elite level, initially for Reiter (again partnered with Kox) and Grasser Racing, as the Lamborghini works support transferred to the latter outfit, and finish ninth overall. The high point was a win at Zolder in which Rosina defended the lead for several laps from future multiple time sportscar champion and Porsche works driver Laurens Vanthoor.

== Retirement and subsequent return with KTM ==
In late 2013, Rosina announced his retirement from racing to focus his business career. His stated intent was to compete only regionally in Slovakia and the Czech Republic. In 2020, however, he would make a surprise return in races of the experimental GTX category of the International GT Open, the 24H Series, and the DTM Trophy, netting a win and two podiums. This time Rosina was competing for noted motorbike and sports car marque KTM. The car was a high power coupé version of the company's X-Bow track car adapted by Rosina's former stable Reiter Engineering, the KTM GTX Concept.

== 2021-2023 European GT2 success ==
2020's success in GTX was followed by a full KTM works drive in 2021 and 2022 in the Stephane Ratel-run Fanatec GT2 European Series, again partnering with Reiter Engineering under the team name True Racing. 2021 was a success, Rosina and his teammate Sehdi Sarmini taking podiums at Misano and Monza, followed by a win at Spa Francorchamps in the season closer. The latter result was particularly significant, being the first overall win for the marque in international GT racing.

In 2022, Rosina would return as a genuine contender in GT2, this time partnered with Bronze level prospect Filip Sladecka. After a forgettable start at Imola which yielded a sixth place and a retirement, the next round at the Red Bull Ring saw the pair finish first in race 1, followed by a respectable fourth in class the following day. At the following meeting at Spa, however, he and countryman Sladecka dominated, with a lights to flag victory in the first race, followed by another win from a third place grid slot in Race 2. This weekend would see the pair take the series lead for the first time with two rounds to go. A third place and a win in two scrappy Valencia races saw Rosina maintain their lead with only the season finale at Paul Ricard to go.

The final round of the season at Paul Ricard started positively for team mate Sladecka and Rosina, in qualifying the pair sealing first and third on the grid for Race 1 and Race 2 respectively. In the first race, however, a chaotic start saw Sladecka drop initially to third, then to ninth after leaving the track, finally recovering to fourth by the time of the mandated driver changes, a position Rosina eventually converted to P3 by the end of the race. Their title rivals Longin and Saelens took victory for 25 points, leaving the series to be decided in the final race later that day.

Race 2 would be a disappointment. A strong start from third moving ahead of the rival High Class Racing Audi would put Rosina into second, but as the Audi’s pace won out, this would slip to third. After the driver change, Rosina’s teammate Sladecka and the Audi R8 of Aurelius Rusteika made contact into the Le Beausset corner, ending Sladecka’s race and the KTM True Racing duo's hopes for the GT2 European Series title. With this, Rosina and his team-mate would have to settle for the consolation of being European Vice Champions.

2023 would see Rosina contest the GT2 Series again with KTM True Racing, this time less successfully, as he secured a single win and fourth place overall in the championship.

== Champion in Super Trofeo Europe ==
In 2024, Rosina competed in the Pro-Am category of the European version of the Lamborghini Super Trofeo Series alongside Czech Broněk Formánek with Mičánek Motorsport. After a dominant year in which Rosina and Formánek took three wins and six podiums from the 11 races in the calendar, the pair were crowned champions at the season finale at Jerez.

== Return to GT2 in 2025 ==
In 2025, Rosina again competed in the GT2 European Series. Partnered with his 2024 Lamborghini Super Trofeo team mate Broněk Formánek, Rosina enjoyed five wins from the first eight races contested. The Czechoslovak pair led the championship by 46 points coming into the penultimate round in Valencia. After a third place finish having received penalties for track limits violations in the first of the weekend’s two races, Rosina and Formánek would clinch the title after their nearest rivals for the championship Mauro Calamia and Roberto Pampanini of Dinamic Motorsport suffered a DNF. Rosina in fact secured the title several weeks before the season finale was due to take place in Barcelona, while the 2025 Lamborghini Super Trofeo Europe Pro-Am category title, of which he remained the incumbent champion, had still not been decided. This meant that for a period lasting 21 days, Rosina had the unusual distinction of holding championship titles in two separate race categories at the same time.

== Business ==
Educated in business management at Bratislava and Oxford Brookes, Rosina is active in business. He is a CEO of Slovak automotive car parts manufacturer Matador Automotive, part of Matador Group.

== Media work ==
Slovakia's most successful sportscar driver, Rosina often acts as colour commentator for Czech and Slovak broadcasts of motor racing, particularly Formula 1. In 2022, he also starred alongside two time World Rally Champion Walter Röhrl in a music video about the Nürburgring, the TF Song (Pineapple King) by British/Austrian rock band the Heizer Monkeys.

In 2026, it was announced that Rosina would join Slovak TV channel Markiza's version of the reality television format Dragons' Den, Jama Levova (literally 'The Lion Pit') as one of the investors. In the show, entrepreneurs pitch their business ideas to a panel of venture capitalists in the hope of securing investment.

== Personal life ==
Rosina lives in Bratislava, Slovakia, and is married with two children.

== Racing record ==
=== Complete Porsche Supercup results ===
(key) (Races in bold indicate pole position – 2 points awarded 2008 onwards in all races) (Races in italics indicate fastest lap)

Year	Team	Car	1	2	3	4	5	6	7	8	9	10	11	12	13	Pos.	Pts
2007	Lechner Racing School	Porsche 997 GT3	BHR; 12	BHR; Ret	ESP; 16	MON; 12	FRA; Ret	GBR; 9	GER	HUN; 8	TUR; 5	ITA; Ret	BEL; Ret			13th	42
2008	Lechner Racing Bahrain	Porsche 997 GT3	BHR; 23†	BHR; 12	ESP; 7	TUR; 17	MON; 10	FRA; 3	GBR; 3	GER; 15	HUN; Ret	ESP; 4	BEL; 9	ITA; 4		10th	89
2009	Walter Lechner Racing	Porsche 997 GT3	BHR; 5	BHR; 10	ESP; 4	MON; 4	TUR; 6	GBR; 11	GER; 2	HUN; 4	ESP; 6	BEL; 5	ITA; 4	UAE; 5	UAE; 8	**3rd**	**164**
2010	Lechner Racing	Porsche 997 GT3	BHR; 2	BHR; 4	ESP; 8	MON; 4	ESP; 6	GBR; 7	GER; 4	HUN; Ret	BEL; 17	ITA; Ret				8th	90
2011	VERVA Racing Team	Porsche 997 GT3	TUR; 10	ESP; 6	MON; Ret	NNS; 8	GBR; 7	NÜR; 5	HUN; 7	BEL; 10	ITA; 9	UAE; 8	UAE; 13			9th	83
2012	Förch Racing	Porsche 997 GT3	BHR; Ret	BHR; 10	MON	ESP	GBR	GER	HUN	HUN	BEL	ITA				20th	6
2013	Lechner Racing	Porsche 997 GT3	ESP; 13	MON	GBR	GER	HUN	BEL	ITA	UAE	UAE					NC	0‡

^{†} Did not finish the race, but was classified as he completed over 90% of the race distance. ^{‡} Guest driver – Not eligible for points.

=== Complete GT1 World Championship results ===
Year	Team	Car	1	2	3	4	5	6	7	8	9	10	11	12	13	14	15	16	17	18	19	20	Pos	Points
2010	Phoenix Racing/Carsport	Corvette C6.R	ABU; QR	ABU; CR	SIL; QR	SIL; CR	BRN; QR; 17	BRN; CR; 8	PRI; QR	PRI; CR	SPA; QR	SPA; CR	NÜR; QR	NÜR; CR	ALG; QR	ALG; CR	NAV; QR	NAV; CR	INT; QR	INT; CR	SAN; QR	SAN; CR	40th	4
2012	Reiter Engineering	Lamborghini Gallardo LP600+ GT3	NOG; QR	NOG; CR	ZOL; QR	ZOL; CR	NAV; QR	NAV; CR	SVK; QR; 13	SVK; CR; 11	ALG; QR; 13	ALG; CR; Ret	SVK; QR; 11	SVK; CR; Ret	MOS; QR	MOS; CR	NUR; QR; 1	NUR; CR; 3	DON; QR; 4	DON; CR; 2			13th	44

=== Complete FIA GT Series results ===
Year	Team	Car	Class	1	2	3	4	5	6	7	8	9	10	11	12	Pos	Points
2013	Lamborghini Blancpain Reiter	Lamborghini Gallardo LP560-4	Pro	NOG; QR	NOG; CR	**ZOL**; **QR**; 2	ZOL; CR; 1	ZAN; QR	ZAN; CR	SVK; QR; 3	SVK; CR; Ret	**NAV**; **QR**; 15	NAV; CR; 17			9th	51
2013	GRT Grasser Racing Team	Lamborghini Gallardo LP560-4	Pro											BAK; QR; 21	BAK; CR; 6	9th	51

=== Complete Blancpain GT Series Sprint Cup results ===
Year	Team	Car	Class	1	2	3	4	5	6	7	8	9	10	11	12	13	14	Pos.	Points
2014	Reiter Engineering	Lamborghini Gallardo FL2	Pro	NOG; QR	NOG; CR	BRH; QR; 9	BRH; CR; Ret	ZAN; QR; 16	ZAN; CR; 7	SVK; QR; Ret	SVK; CR; DNS	ALG; QR	ALG; CR	ZOL; QR	ZOL; CR	BAK; QR	BAK; CR	24th	6
2016	GRT Grasser Racing Team	Lamborghini Huracán GT3	Pro	MIS; QR; Ret	MIS; CR; Ret	BRH; QR; 16	BRH; CR; 17	NÜR; QR; 17	NÜR; CR; 24	HUN; QR; 13	HUN; CR; Ret	CAT; QR	CAT; CR					NC	0

=== Complete GT2 European Series results ===
Year	Team	Car	Class	1	2	3	4	5	6	7	8	9	10	11	12	Pos.	Points
2021	True Racing by Reiter Engineering	KTM X-Bow GT2 Concept	Pro-Am	MON; QR; 4	MON; CR; 5	HOC; QR; Ret	HOC; CR; DNS	MIS; QR; Ret	MIS; CR; 3	SPA; QR; 6	SPA; CR; 1	LEC; QR	LEC; CR			6th	80
2022	KTM True Racing	KTM X-Bow GT2 Concept	Pro-Am	IMO; QR; 12	IMO; CR; Ret	RBR; QR; 1	RBR; CR; 7	MIS; QR; 2	MIS; CR; 3	SPA; QR; 1	SPA; CR; 1	VAL; QR; 4	VAL; CR; 1	LEC; QR; 3	LEC; QR; 10†	2nd	189
