= 2021 GT2 European Series =

The 2021 Fanatec GT2 European Series is the first season of the GT2 European Series. The season begins on 17 April at Autodromo Nazionale Monza in Monza and ended on 2 October at Circuit Paul Ricard in Le Castellet.

== Calendar ==
A round scheduled for Silverstone on 25–27 June was cancelled and replaced with Misano on the following weekend.

Round	Circuit	Date	Support Series
1	Autodromo Nazionale Monza, Monza, Italy	15–17 April	GT World Challenge Europe Endurance Cup
2	Hockenheimring, Hockenheim, Germany	14–15 May	
3	Misano World Circuit Marco Simoncelli, Misano Adriatico, Italy	2–4 July	GT World Challenge Europe Sprint Cup
4	Circuit de Spa-Francorchamps, Stavelot, Belgium	22–25 July	
5	Circuit Paul Ricard, Le Castellet, France	1–2 October	FFSA French GT

== Entry list ==
Team	Car	No.	Drivers	Class		Rounds
Team	Car	No.	Drivers	Car	Driver	Rounds
(Italy) Scuderia Ravetto & Ruberti	Ferrari 488 Challenge Evo	3	(Italy) Luca Demarchi	INV	PA	5
(Italy) Scuderia Ravetto & Ruberti	Ferrari 488 Challenge Evo	3	(United Kingdom) JM Littman	INV	PA	5
(Spain) Speed Factory Racing	Porsche 911 GT2 RS Clubsport	5	(Lithuania) Aurelijus Rusteika	GT2	PA	All
(Spain) Speed Factory Racing	Porsche 911 GT2 RS Clubsport	5	(Netherlands) Michael Vergers	GT2	PA	All
(Switzerland) Sportec Motorsport	KTM X-Bow GT2	7	(Switzerland) Christoph Ulrich	GT2	Am	All
(Switzerland) Sportec Motorsport	KTM X-Bow GT2	7	(Switzerland) Adrian Spescha	GT2	Am	1, 3
(Switzerland) Sportec Motorsport	KTM X-Bow GT2	7	(Switzerland) Christoph Lenz	GT2	Am	2
(United Kingdom) Toro Verde GT	Lamborghini Huracán Super Trofeo Evo GT2	9	(United Kingdom) David Fairbrother	GT2	PA	1–2
(United Kingdom) Toro Verde GT	Lamborghini Huracán Super Trofeo Evo GT2	9	(United Kingdom) Jordan Witt	GT2	PA	1–2
(Belgium) PK Carsport	Audi R8 LMS GT2	11	(Germany) Jens Liebhauser	GT2	PA	5
(Belgium) PK Carsport	Audi R8 LMS GT2	11	(Belgium) Stienes Longin	GT2	PA	5
(Belgium) PK Carsport	Audi R8 LMS GT2	81	(Belgium) Peter Guelinckx	GT2	PA	All
(Belgium) PK Carsport	Audi R8 LMS GT2	81	(Belgium) Bert Longin	GT2	PA	All
(Austria) True Racing by Reiter Engineering	KTM X-Bow GT2	16	(Austria) Sehdi Sarmini	GT2	PA	All
(Austria) True Racing by Reiter Engineering	KTM X-Bow GT2	16	(Slovakia) Štefan Rosina	GT2	PA	1–4
(Austria) True Racing by Reiter Engineering	KTM X-Bow GT2	17	(Austria) Klaus Angerhofer	GT2	Am	All
(Austria) True Racing by Reiter Engineering	KTM X-Bow GT2	17	(Austria) Hubert Trunkenpolz	GT2	Am	All
(Austria) True Racing by Reiter Engineering	KTM X-Bow GT2	23	(Netherlands) Peter Kox	GT2	PA	1–4
(Austria) True Racing by Reiter Engineering	KTM X-Bow GT2	23	(Germany) Rupert Atzberger	GT2	PA	1–2
(Austria) True Racing by Reiter Engineering	KTM X-Bow GT2	23	(Norway) Einar Thorsen	GT2	PA	3
(Austria) True Racing by Reiter Engineering	KTM X-Bow GT2	23	(Netherlands) Michael Bleekemolen	GT2	PA	4
(Austria) True Racing by Reiter Engineering	KTM X-Bow GT2	24	(Austria) Kris Rosenberger	GT2	Am	All
(Austria) True Racing by Reiter Engineering	KTM X-Bow GT2	24	(Germany) Hans-Joachim Stuck	GT2	Am	All
(Switzerland) Auto Vitesse	Lamborghini Huracán Super Trofeo Evo GT2	19	(Switzerland) Cyril Leimer	GT2	Am	5
(Switzerland) Auto Vitesse	Lamborghini Huracán Super Trofeo Evo GT2	63	(Switzerland) Cédric Leimer	GT2	PA	5
(Switzerland) Auto Vitesse	Lamborghini Huracán Super Trofeo Evo GT2	63	(France) Julien Piguet	GT2	PA	5
(Denmark) High Class Racing	Brabham BT63 GT2	20	(Denmark) Dennis Andersen	GT2	PA	5
(Denmark) High Class Racing	Brabham BT63 GT2	20	(Australia) David Brabham	GT2	PA	5
(Denmark) High Class Racing	Audi R8 LMS GT2	33	(Denmark) Anders Fjordbach	GT2	PA	All
(Denmark) High Class Racing	Audi R8 LMS GT2	33	(United States) Mark Patterson	GT2	PA	All
(Italy) Target Racing	Lamborghini Huracán Super Trofeo Evo GT2	27	(Italy) Mauro Casadei	GT2	Am	5
(Italy) Target Racing	Lamborghini Huracán Super Trofeo Evo GT2	27	(Sweden) Stefan Thor Larsson	GT2	Am	5
(Italy) Target Racing	Lamborghini Huracán Super Trofeo Evo GT2	32	(Czech Republic) Jaromir Jirik	GT2	Am	4–5
(Italy) Target Racing	Lamborghini Huracán Super Trofeo Evo GT2	32	(Italy) Mauro Casadei	GT2	Am	4
(Italy) Target Racing	Lamborghini Huracán Super Trofeo Evo GT2	32	(China) Han Huilin	GT2	Am	5
(Italy) Target Racing	Lamborghini Huracán Super Trofeo Evo GT2	63	(Italy) Mauro Casadei	GT2	Am	3
(Italy) Target Racing	Lamborghini Huracán Super Trofeo Evo GT2	63	(Switzerland) Cédric Leimer	GT2	Am	3
(Germany) AKF Motorsport	Lamborghini Huracán Super Trofeo Evo GT2	28	(Germany) Oliver Freymuth	GT2	Am	2
(Spain) SVC Sport Management	Lamborghini Huracán Super Trofeo GT2	44	(France) Joseph Collado	GT2	Am	1
(Spain) SVC Sport Management	Lamborghini Huracán Super Trofeo GT2	44	(Italy) Patrick Zamparini	GT2	Am	1
(France) CMR	Ferrari 488 Challenge Evo	73	(France) Alexis Berthet	INV	Am	1
(France) CMR	Ferrari 488 Challenge Evo	73	(France) Patrick Michellier	INV	Am	1
(Italy) LP Racing	Audi R8 LMS GT2	88	(Italy) Luca Pirri Ardizzone	GT2	PA	All
(Italy) LP Racing	Audi R8 LMS GT2	88	(France) Stéphane Ratel	GT2	PA	All
(Italy) LP Racing	Porsche 911 GT2 RS Clubsport	911	(Switzerland) Leonardo Gorini	GT2	Am	4–5
(Germany) Attempto Racing	Audi R8 LMS GT2	99	(Turkey) Ali Çapan	GT2	Am	2
(Germany) Teichmann Racing	KTM X-Bow GT2	123	(Germany) Rupert Atzberger	GT2	PA	4
(Germany) Teichmann Racing	KTM X-Bow GT2	123	(Germany) Hendrik Still	GT2	PA	4

Icon	Class
Car
GT2	GT2 Cars
INV	Invitational
Drivers
PA	Pro-Am Cup
Am	Am Cup

== Race results ==
Bold indicates overall winner.

Round		Circuit	Pole position	GT2 Pro-Am Winners	GT2 Am Winners
1	R1	(Italy) Monza	(Denmark) No. 33 High Class Racing	(Denmark) **No. 33 High Class Racing**	(Spain) No. 44 SVC Sport Management
1	R1	(Italy) Monza	(Denmark) Anders Fjordbach (United States) Mark Patterson	(Denmark) **Anders Fjordbach** (United States) **Mark Patterson**	(France) Joseph Collado (Italy) Patrick Zamparini
1	R2	(Italy) Monza	(Austria) No. 23 True Racing by Reiter Engineering	(Belgium) **No. 81 PK Carsport**	(Switzerland) No. 7 Sportec Motorsport
1	R2	(Italy) Monza	(Germany) Rupert Atzberger (Netherlands) Peter Kox	(Belgium) **Peter Guelinckx** (Belgium) **Bert Longin**	(Switzerland) Adrian Spescha (Switzerland) Christoph Ulrich
2	R1	(Germany) Hockenheim	(Belgium) No. 81 PK Carsport	(Denmark) **No. 33 High Class Racing**	(Germany) No. 28 AKF Motorsport
2	R1	(Germany) Hockenheim	(Belgium) Peter Guelinckx (Belgium) Bert Longin	(Denmark) **Anders Fjordbach** (United States) **Mark Patterson**	(Germany) Oliver Freymuth
2	R2	(Germany) Hockenheim	(Denmark) No. 33 High Class Racing	(Denmark) **No. 33 High Class Racing**	(Switzerland) No. 7 Sportec Motorsport
2	R2	(Germany) Hockenheim	(Denmark) Anders Fjordbach (United States) Mark Patterson	(Denmark) **Anders Fjordbach** (United States) **Mark Patterson**	(Switzerland) Christoph Lenz (Switzerland) Christoph Ulrich
3	R1	(Italy) Misano	(Austria) No. 24 True Racing by Reiter Engineering	(Denmark) **No. 33 High Class Racing**	(Switzerland) No. 7 Sportec Motorsport
3	R1	(Italy) Misano	(Austria) Kris Rosenberger (Germany) Hans-Joachim Stuck	(Denmark) **Anders Fjordbach** (United States) **Mark Patterson**	(Switzerland) Adrian Spescha (Switzerland) Christoph Ulrich
3	R2	(Italy) Misano	(Belgium) No. 81 PK Carsport	**(Belgium) No. 81 PK Carsport**	(Italy) No. 63 Target Racing
3	R2	(Italy) Misano	(Belgium) Peter Guelinckx (Belgium) Bert Longin	**(Belgium) Peter Guelinckx** **(Belgium) Bert Longin**	(Italy) Mauro Casadei (Switzerland) Cédric Leimer
4	R1	(Belgium) Spa-Francorchamps	(Switzerland) No. 7 Sportec Motorsport	**(Belgium) No. 81 PK Carsport**	(Switzerland) No. 7 Sportec Motorsport
4	R1	(Belgium) Spa-Francorchamps	(Switzerland) Christoph Ulrich	**(Belgium) Peter Guelinckx** **(Belgium) Bert Longin**	(Switzerland) Christoph Ulrich
4	R2	(Belgium) Spa-Francorchamps	(Austria) No. 16 True Racing by Reiter Engineering	**(Austria) No. 16 True Racing by Reiter Engineering**	(Switzerland) No. 7 Sportec Motorsport
4	R2	(Belgium) Spa-Francorchamps	(Slovakia) Štefan Rosina (Austria) Sehdi Sarmini	**(Slovakia) Štefan Rosina** **(Austria) Sehdi Sarmini**	(Switzerland) Christoph Ulrich
5	R1	(France) Paul Ricard	(Switzerland) No. 7 Sportec Motorsport	(Switzerland) No. 63 AutoVitesse	**(Switzerland) No. 7 Sportec Motorsport**
5	R1	(France) Paul Ricard	(Switzerland) Christoph Ulrich	(Switzerland) Cédric Leimer (France) Julien Piguet	**(Switzerland) Christoph Ulrich**
5	R2	(France) Paul Ricard	(Denmark) No. 33 High Class Racing	**(Denmark) No. 33 High Class Racing**	(Italy) No. 911 LP Racing
5	R2	(France) Paul Ricard	(Denmark) Anders Fjordbach (United States) Mark Patterson	**(Denmark) Anders Fjordbach** **(United States) Mark Patterson**	(Switzerland) Leonardo Gorini
Results:

== Championship standings ==
Scoring system

Championship points are awarded for the first ten positions in each race. Entries are required to complete 75% of the winning car's race distance in order to be classified and earn points.

Position	1st	2nd	3rd	4th	5th	6th	7th	8th	9th	10th
Points	25	18	15	12	10	8	6	4	2	1

=== Drivers' championships ===
Pos.	Driver	Team	MON (Italy)		HOC (Germany)		MIS (Italy)		SPA (Belgium)		LEC (France)		Points
GT2 Pro-Am
1	(Denmark) Anders Fjordbach (United States) Mark Patterson	(Denmark) High Class Racing	1	4	1	1	1	2	10	5	3	1	201
2	(Belgium) Peter Guelinckx (Belgium) Bert Longin	(Belgium) PK Carsport	5	1	3	6	3	1	1	7	4	7	174
3	(Lithuania) Aurelijus Rusteika (Netherlands) Michael Vergers	(Spain) Speed Factory Racing	3	3	4	3	4	8	2	Ret	10	8	120
4	(Italy) Luca Pirri (France) Stéphane Ratel	(Italy) LP Racing	Ret	2	6	2	2	6	8	Ret	8	10	110
5	(Austria) Sehdi Sarmini	(Austria) True Racing by Reiter Engineering	4	5	Ret	DNS	Ret	3	6	1	9	Ret	90
6	(Slovakia) Štefan Rosina	(Austria) True Racing by Reiter Engineering	4	5	Ret	DNS	Ret	3	6	1			80
7	(Switzerland) Cédric Leimer (France) Julien Piguet	(Switzerland) Auto Vitesse									2	3	43
8	(United Kingdom) David Fairbrother (United Kingdom) Jordan Witt	(United Kingdom) Toro Verde GT	6	DNS	7	7							28
9	(Netherlands) Peter Kox	(Austria) True Racing by Reiter Engineering	DNS	DNS	2	10	Ret	Ret	Ret	DNS			26
9	(Germany) Rupert Atzberger	(Austria) True Racing by Reiter Engineering	DNS	DNS	2	10							26
10	(Denmark) Dennis Andersen (Australia) David Brabham	(Denmark) High Class Racing									12	Ret	6
11	(Italy) Luca Demarchi (United Kingdom) JM Litmann	(Italy) Scuderia Ravetto & Ruberti									14	DNS	4
12	(Norway) Einar Thorsen	(Austria) True Racing by Reiter Engineering					Ret	Ret					0
13	(Netherlands) Michael Bleekemolen	(Austria) True Racing by Reiter Engineering							Ret	DNS			0
	(Germany) Jens Liebhauser (Belgium) Stienes Longin	(Belgium) PK Carsport									DNS	DNS	0
GT2 Am
1	(Switzerland) Christoph Ulrich	(Switzerland) Sportec Motorsport	7	6	9	4	5	5	3	2	1	Ret	201
2	(Austria) Kris Rosenberger (Germany) Hans-Joachim Stuck	(Austria) True Racing by Reiter Engineering	Ret	7	8	5	6	7	4	3	5	5	156
3	(Austria) Klaus Angerhofer (Austria) Hubert Trunkenpolz	(Austria) True Racing by Reiter Engineering	8	8	10	8	7	9	9	6	DNS	DNS	106
4	(Switzerland) Adrian Spescha	(Switzerland) Sportec Motorsport	7	6			5	5					86
5	(Italy) Mauro Casadei	(Italy) Target Racing					8	4	7	Ret	13	9	67
6	(Switzerland) Leonardo Gorini	(Italy) LP Racing							5	4	11	2	65
7	(Switzerland) Christoph Lenz	(Switzerland) Sportec Motorsport			9	4							40
8	(Czech Republic) Jaromir Jirik	(Italy) Target Racing							7	Ret	6	6	39
9	(Germany) Oliver Freymuth	(Germany) AKF Motorsport			5	9							37
9	(Switzerland) Cedric Leimer	(Italy) Target Racing					8	4					37
10	(Switzerland) Cyril Leimer	(Switzerland) Auto Vitesse									7	4	30
11	(China) Han Huilin	(Italy) Target Racing									6	6	27
12	(France) Joseph Collado (Italy) Patrick Zamparini	(Spain) SVC Sport Management	2	Ret									25
13	(France) Alexis Berthet (France) Patrick Michellier	(France) CMR	9	9									24
14	(Sweden) Stefan Thor Larsson	(Italy) Target Racing									13	9	18
	(Turkey) Ali Çapan	(Germany) Attempto Racing			DNS	DNS							
Pos.	Driver	Team	MON (Italy)		HOC (Germany)		MIS (Italy)		SPA (Belgium)		LEC (France)		Points

== See also ==
- 2021 GT World Challenge Europe
- 2021 GT World Challenge Europe Endurance Cup
- 2021 GT World Challenge Asia
- 2021 GT World Challenge America
- 2021 GT World Challenge Australia
