= 2022 GT2 European Series =

The 2022 Fanatec GT2 European Series is the second season of the GT2 European Series. The season began on 1 April at Imola Circuit in Imola and ended on 16 October at Circuit Paul Ricard in Le Castellet.

== Calendar ==
The 2022 calendar was released during the annual SRO press conference on 10 October 2021, featuring six rounds. The Red Bull Ring and Circuit Ricardo Tormo marked additions from the 2021 schedule, while the event at the Hockenheimring was not renewed for 2022. On 29 October 2021, another change to the schedule was announced, moving the opening round from Monza to Imola and staging the event one week earlier.

Round	Circuit	Date	Supporting
1	Imola Circuit, Imola, Italy	1–3 April	GT World Challenge Europe Endurance Cup
2	Red Bull Ring, Spielburg, Austria	20–22 May	ADAC GT Masters
3	Misano World Circuit Marco Simoncelli, Misano Adriatico, Italy	2–3 July	GT World Challenge Europe Sprint Cup
4	Circuit de Spa-Francorchamps, Stavelot, Belgium	22–24 July	FFSA French GT
5	Circuit Ricardo Tormo, Cheste, Spain	17–18 September	GT World Challenge Europe Sprint Cup
6	Circuit Paul Ricard, Le Castellet, France	15–16 October	FFSA French GT

== Series news ==
- The points format received an update for the 2022 season. Only the best five rounds from each team would count towards the overall championship.

== Entry list ==
Team	Car	No.	Drivers	Class	Rounds
(Australia) Brabham Automotive Factory Racing	Brabham BT63 GT2	1	(Denmark) Anders Fjordbach	PA	All
(Australia) Brabham Automotive Factory Racing	Brabham BT63 GT2	1	(United States) Kevin Weeda	PA	All
(Denmark) High Class Racing	Audi R8 LMS GT2	5	(Lithuania) Aurelijus Rusteika	PA	All
(Denmark) High Class Racing	Audi R8 LMS GT2	5	(Netherlands) Michael Vergers	PA	All
(Italy) Ebimotors	Porsche 911 GT2 RS Clubsport	7	(Italy) Gianluca Giorgi	Am	1–4, 6
(Italy) Ebimotors	Porsche 911 GT2 RS Clubsport	7	(Italy) Alberto Scilla	Am	3
(Italy) Ebimotors	Porsche 911 GT2 RS Clubsport	7	(Italy) Alessandro Baccani	Am	4, 6
(Italy) Ebimotors	Porsche 911 GT2 RS Clubsport	66	(Italy) Alessandro Baccani	Am	3
(Italy) Ebimotors	Porsche 911 GT2 RS Clubsport	66	(Italy) Paolo Venerosi Pesciolini	Am	3
(Italy) Target Racing	Lamborghini Huracan Super Trofeo Evo2 GT2	9	(Italy) Pierlugi Alessandri	Am	1
(Italy) Target Racing	Lamborghini Huracan Super Trofeo Evo2 GT2	9	(Sri Lanka) Dilantha Malagamuwa	Am	1
(Italy) Target Racing	Lamborghini Huracan Super Trofeo Evo2 GT2	24	(Greece) Dimitrios Deverikos	Am	3
(Italy) Target Racing	Lamborghini Huracan Super Trofeo Evo2 GT2	24	(Fédération Internationale de l'Automobile) Dmitry Gvazava (Note: Dmitry Gvazava is Russian, but competes as a neutral competitor using the Fédération Internationale de l'Automobile flag as Belarusian and Russian national emblems were banned by the association due to the Russian invasion of Ukraine.)	Am	3
(Belgium) PK Carsport	Audi R8 LMS GT2	11	(Belgium) Stienes Longin	PA	All
(Belgium) PK Carsport	Audi R8 LMS GT2	11	(Belgium) Nicolas Saelens	PA	All
(Belgium) PK Carsport	Audi R8 LMS GT2	81	(Belgium) Peter Guelinckx	PA	All
(Belgium) PK Carsport	Audi R8 LMS GT2	81	(Belgium) Bert Longin	PA	All
(Austria) KTM True Racing	KTM X-Bow GT2	14	(Austria) Horst Felbermayr Jr.	PA	2
(Austria) KTM True Racing	KTM X-Bow GT2	14	(Austria) Reinhard Kofler	PA	2
(Austria) KTM True Racing	KTM X-Bow GT2	15	(Austria) Laura Kraihamer	PA	1–2
(Austria) KTM True Racing	KTM X-Bow GT2	15	(Austria) Kris Rosenberger	PA	1–2
(Austria) KTM True Racing	KTM X-Bow GT2	15	(Slovakia) Štefan Rosina	PA	3–6
(Austria) KTM True Racing	KTM X-Bow GT2	15	(Slovakia) Filip Sládečka	PA	3–6
(Austria) KTM True Racing	KTM X-Bow GT2	16	(Slovakia) Štefan Rosina	PA	1–2
(Austria) KTM True Racing	KTM X-Bow GT2	16	(Austria) Sehdi Sarmini	PA	1
(Austria) KTM True Racing	KTM X-Bow GT2	16	(Slovakia) Filip Sládečka	PA	2
(Austria) KTM True Racing	KTM X-Bow GT2	16	(Austria) Sehdi Sarmini	Am	4–6
(Austria) KTM True Racing	KTM X-Bow GT2	16	(Austria) Kris Rosenberger	Am	4–6
(Austria) KTM True Racing	KTM X-Bow GT2	17	(Austria) Klaus Angerhofer	Am	All
(Austria) KTM True Racing	KTM X-Bow GT2	17	(Austria) Hubert Trunkenpolz	Am	All
(Italy) LP Racing	Audi R8 LMS GT2	18	(Austria) Michael Doppelmayr	Am	1–5
(Italy) LP Racing	Audi R8 LMS GT2	18	(Germany) Elia Erhart	Am	1–5
(Italy) LP Racing	Audi R8 LMS GT2	67	(France) Henry Hassid	Am	All
(Italy) LP Racing	Audi R8 LMS GT2	67	(France) Maxime Hassid	Am	6
(Italy) LP Racing	Audi R8 LMS GT2	88	(Italy) Luca Pirri	PA	All
(Italy) LP Racing	Audi R8 LMS GT2	88	(Hong Kong) Angelo Negro	PA	1
(Italy) LP Racing	Audi R8 LMS GT2	88	(Italy) Diego Alessi	PA	2
(Italy) LP Racing	Audi R8 LMS GT2	88	(France) Stéphane Ratel	PA	3–4, 6
(Italy) LP Racing	Audi R8 LMS GT2	88	(Italy) Stefano Constantini	PA	5
(Italy) LP Racing	Porsche 911 GT2 RS Clubsport	911	(Switzerland) Leonardo Gorini	Am	All
(Germany) Reiter Engineering	KTM X-Bow GT2	24	(France) Gilles Vannelet	Am	6
(Germany) SPS Automotive Performance	Mercedes-AMG GT Track Series	55	(France) Stéphane Ratel	INV	2
(Germany) SPS Automotive Performance	Mercedes-AMG GT Track Series	55	(Germany) Bernd Schneider	INV	2

Icon	Class
PA	Pro-Am Cup
Am	Am Cup
INV	Invitational

== Race results ==
Bold indicates overall winner

Round		Circuit	Pole position	Pro-Am Winners	Am Winners
1	R1	(Italy) Imola	(Italy) #18 LP Racing	(Denmark) #5 High Class Racing	**(Italy) #67 LP Racing**
1	R1	(Italy) Imola	(Austria) Michael Doppelmayr (Germany) Elia Erhart	(Lithuania) Aurelijus Rusteika (Netherlands) Michael Vergers	**(France) Henry Hassid**
1	R2	(Italy) Imola	(Belgium) #11 PK Carsport	**(Belgium) #11 PK Carsport**	(Italy) #7 Ebimotors
1	R2	(Italy) Imola	(Belgium) Stienes Longin (Belgium) Nicolas Saelens	**(Belgium) Stienes Longin** **(Belgium) Nicolas Saelens**	(Italy) Gianluca Giorgi
2	R1	(Austria) Red Bull Ring	(Austria) #16 KTM True Racing	**(Austria) #16 KTM True Racing**	(Italy) #67 LP Racing
2	R1	(Austria) Red Bull Ring	(Slovakia) Štefan Rosina (Slovakia) Filip Sládečka	**(Slovakia) Štefan Rosina** **(Slovakia) Filip Sládečka**	(France) Henry Hassid
2	R2	(Austria) Red Bull Ring	(Austria) #16 KTM True Racing	(Belgium) #11 PK Carsport	**(Italy) #18 LP Racing**
2	R2	(Austria) Red Bull Ring	(Slovakia) Štefan Rosina (Slovakia) Filip Sládečka	(Belgium) Stienes Longin (Belgium) Nicolas Saelens	**(Germany) Elia Erhart**
3	R1	(Italy) Misano	(Italy) #24 Target Racing	**(Australia) #1 Brabham Automotive Factory Racing**	(Italy) #18 LP Racing
3	R1	(Italy) Misano	(Greece) Dimitrios Deverikos (Fédération Internationale de l'Automobile) Dmitry Gvazava	**(Denmark) Anders Fjordbach** **(United States) Kevin Weeda**	(Austria) Michael Doppelmayr (Germany) Elia Erhart
3	R2	(Italy) Misano	(Italy) #18 LP Racing	**(Belgium) #11 PK Carsport**	(Italy) #67 LP Racing
3	R2	(Italy) Misano	(Austria) Michael Doppelmayr (Germany) Elia Erhart	**(Belgium) Stienes Longin** **(Belgium) Nicolas Saelens**	(France) Henry Hassid
4	R1	(Belgium) Spa	(Austria) #15 KTM True Racing	**(Austria) #15 KTM True Racing**	(Italy) #67 LP Racing
4	R1	(Belgium) Spa	(Slovakia) Štefan Rosina (Slovakia) Filip Sládečka	**(Slovakia) Štefan Rosina** **(Slovakia) Filip Sládečka**	(France) Henry Hassid
4	R2	(Belgium) Spa	(Australia) #1 Brabham Automotive Factory Racing	**(Austria) #15 KTM True Racing**	(Italy) #7 Ebimotors
4	R2	(Belgium) Spa	(Denmark) Anders Fjordbach (United States) Kevin Weeda	**(Slovakia) Štefan Rosina** **(Slovakia) Filip Sládečka**	(Italy) Gianluca Giorgi (Italy) Alessandro Baccani
5	R1	(Spain) Valencia	(Italy) #18 LP Racing	**(Belgium) #11 PK Carsport**	(Italy) #67 LP Racing
5	R1	(Spain) Valencia	(Austria) Michael Doppelmayr (Germany) Elia Erhart	**(Belgium) Stienes Longin** **(Belgium) Nicolas Saelens**	(France) Henry Hassid
5	R2	(Spain) Valencia	(Australia) #1 Brabham Automotive Factory Racing	**(Austria) #15 KTM True Racing**	(Italy) #67 LP Racing
5	R2	(Spain) Valencia	(Denmark) Anders Fjordbach (United States) Kevin Weeda	**(Slovakia) Štefan Rosina** **(Slovakia) Filip Sládečka**	(France) Henry Hassid
6	R1	(France) Paul Ricard	(Austria) #15 KTM True Racing	**(Belgium) #11 PK Carsport**	(Italy) #67 LP Racing
6	R1	(France) Paul Ricard	(Slovakia) Štefan Rosina (Slovakia) Filip Sládečka	**(Belgium) Stienes Longin** **(Belgium) Nicolas Saelens**	(France) Henry Hassid (France) Maxime Hassid
6	R2	(France) Paul Ricard	(Australia) #1 Brabham Automotive Factory Racing	**(Belgium) #11 PK Carsport**	(Germany) #24 Reiter Engineering
6	R2	(France) Paul Ricard	(Denmark) Anders Fjordbach (United States) Kevin Weeda	**(Belgium) Stienes Longin** **(Belgium) Nicolas Saelens**	(France) Gilles Vannelet

== Championship standings ==
Scoring system

Championship points are awarded for the first ten positions in each race. Entries are required to complete 75% of the winning car's race distance in order to be classified and earn points.

Position	**1st**	**2nd**	**3rd**	**4th**	**5th**	**6th**	**7th**	**8th**	**9th**	**10th**	**Pole**
Points	25	18	15	12	10	8	6	4	2	1	1

=== Drivers' championships ===
Pos.	Driver	Team	IMO (Italy)		RBR (Austria)		MIS (Italy)		SPA (Belgium)		VAL (Spain)		LEC (France)		Points
Pro-Am
1	(Belgium) Stienes Longin (Belgium) Nicolas Saelens	(Belgium) PK Carsport	**5**	**1**	Ret	2	5	1	2	3	1	2	1	1	203
2	(Slovakia) Štefan Rosina	(Austria) KTM True Racing	12	Ret	**1**	**7**	**2**	3	**1**	1	**4**	1	**3**	10†	189
2	(Slovakia) Filip Sládečka	(Austria) KTM True Racing			**1**	**7**	**2**	3	**1**	1	**4**	1	**3**	10†	189
3	(Belgium) Peter Guelinckx (Belgium) Bert Longin	(Belgium) PK Carsport	4	3	3	6	3	4	10	8	3	6	4	9†	143
4	(Denmark) Anders Fjordbach (United States) Kevin Weeda	(Australia) Brabham Automotive Factory Racing	9	6	9	13	1	**10**	3	**2**	6	**11†**	2	**8†**	140
5	(Lithuania) Aurelijus Rusteika (Netherlands) Michael Vergers	(Denmark) High Class Racing	3	2	Ret	11	4	7	6	4	7	3	5	7†	137
6	(Italy) Luca Pirri	(Italy) LP Racing	8	9	8	10	8	6	9	10	2	4	8	6	120
7	(France) Stéphane Ratel	(Italy) LP Racing					8	6	9	10			8	6	64
8	(Austria) Horst Felbermayr Jr. (Austria) Reinhard Kofler	(Austria) KTM True Racing			4	3									33
9	(Italy) Stefano Costantini	(Italy) LP Racing									2	4			30
10	(Italy) Diego Alessi	(Italy) LP Racing			8	10									22
10	(Hong Kong) Angelo Negro	(Italy) LP Racing	8	9											22
11	(Austria) Laura Kraihamer (Austria) Kris Rosenberger	(Austria) KTM True Racing	13	10	Ret	Ret									14
12	(Austria) Sehdi Sarmini	(Austria) KTM True Racing	12	Ret											8
Am
1	(France) Henry Hassid	(Italy) LP Racing	1	8	2	5	13†	2	**4**	7	5	**5**	6	3	212
2	(Italy) Gianluca Giorgi	(Italy) Ebimotors	2	**4**	5	**9**	9	11	8	5			7	4	170
3	(Switzerland) Leonardo Gorini	(Italy) LP Racing	6	5	7	12	12	9	5	6	9	9	Ret	DNS	138
4	(Germany) Elia Erhart	(Italy) LP Racing	**10**	7	Ret	1	6	**Ret**	7	**11**	**8**	10			132
5	(Austria) Klaus Angerhofer (Austria) Hubert Trunkenpolz	(Austria) KTM True Racing	7	11	**6**	4	10	8	11	12	Ret	7	9	5	128
6	(Austria) Michael Doppelmayr	(Italy) LP Racing	**10**	7	Ret		6	**Ret**	7	**11**	**8**	10			106
7	(Italy) Alessandro Baccani	(Italy) Ebimotors					11	Ret	8	5			7	4	70
8	(Austria) Sehdi Sarmini (Austria) Kris Rosenberger	(Austria) KTM True Racing							12	9	10	8	Ret	DNS	47
9	(France) Maxime Hassid	(Italy) LP Racing											6	3	43
10	(Greece) Dimitrios Deverikos (Fédération Internationale de l'Automobile) Dmitry Gvazava	(Italy) Target Racing					**7**	5							37
11	(France) Gilles Vannelet	(Germany) Reiter Engineering											**Ret**	**2**	27
12	(Italy) Alberto Scilla	(Italy) Ebimotors					9	11							25
13	(Italy) Pierlugi Alessandri (Sri Lanka) Dilantha Malagamuwa	(Italy) Target Racing	11	12											16
14	(Italy) Paolo Venerosi Pesciolini	(Italy) Ebimotors					11	Ret							10
Pos.	Driver	Team	IMO (Italy)		RBR (Austria)		MIS (Italy)		SPA (Belgium)		VAL (Spain)		LEC (France)		Points

Colour	Result
Gold	Winner
Silver	Second place
Bronze	Third place
Green	Points classification
Blue	Non-points classification
Blue	Non-classified finish (NC)
Purple	Retired, not classified (Ret)
Red	Did not qualify (DNQ)
Red	Did not pre-qualify (DNPQ)
Black	Disqualified (DSQ)
White	Did not start (DNS)
White	Withdrew (WD)
White	Race cancelled (C)
Blank	Did not practice (DNP)
Blank	Did not arrive (DNA)
Blank	Excluded (EX)

- **Bold** - Pole position
- Italics - Fastest lap

Notes:

- † – Entry did not finish the race but was classified, as it completed more than 75% of the race distance.
