= Anders Fjordbach =

Danish racing driver

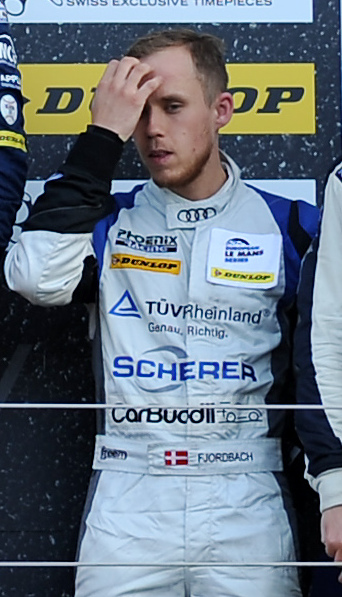
- Fjordbach in 2017
- Nationality: (Denmark) Danish
- Born: Anders Bjerg Fjordbach; 4 November 1990 (age 36) Aalborg, Denmark

FIA World Endurance Championship career
- Debut season: 2019
- Current team: High Class Racing
- Categorisation: FIA Silver
- Car number: 20
- Starts: 14
- Wins: 0
- Podiums: 3

Previous series
- 2017–2020 2015–2017 2014–2015, '18 2012–2014: European Le Mans Series; 24H Series; Blancpain Endurance Series; Danish Thundersport Championship

Championship titles
- 2021: GT2 European Series – Pro-Am

Anders Bjerg Fjordbach (born 4 November 1990) is a Danish racing driver, who is competing in the European Le Mans Series for High Class Racing.

== Career ==
Fjordbach began his senior racing career in 2007, competing in the Yokohama 1600 Challenge Denmark and the Volkswagen Polo Cup Denmark, finishing 11th and tenth in the championships respectively. The following year, Fjordbach returned to the Polo Cup, finishing fifth. In 2009, an accident at Oschersleben during ADAC Procar competition led him to postpone his racing career, making his return in 2012. After several years competing in national championships, Fjordbach signed a contract with High Class Racing in 2013 to compete in the Danish Thundersport Championship; a partnership that would later lead to appearances at the 24 Hours of Le Mans.

In 2015, Fjordbach won the Dubai 24 Hour in the 997 class, competing for Team Black Falcon. Two years later, Fjorbach claimed his second class victory at the event, also driving for Team Black Falcon in the equivalent Porsche Cup class. Later in 2015, Fjordbach began competing in the then-Blancpain Sprint Series, winning the Silver Cup class in his first event at Nogaro.

2017 marked the beginning of Fjordbach's career in prototypes, as he finished ninth in the LMP2 class of the European Le Mans Series. This experience led to a ride with Algarve Pro Racing during the 2018–19 Asian Le Mans Series season, with aims to win the P2 Am Trophy. One of Fjordbach's co-drivers on that team was Chris McMurry, father of American driver Matt McMurry, who competed for PR1 Mathiasen Motorsport in the WeatherTech SportsCar Championship. With the team short a driver, Fjordbach was called in for the 2019 12 Hours of Sebring. The team would finish second in class, 13 laps behind the leader.

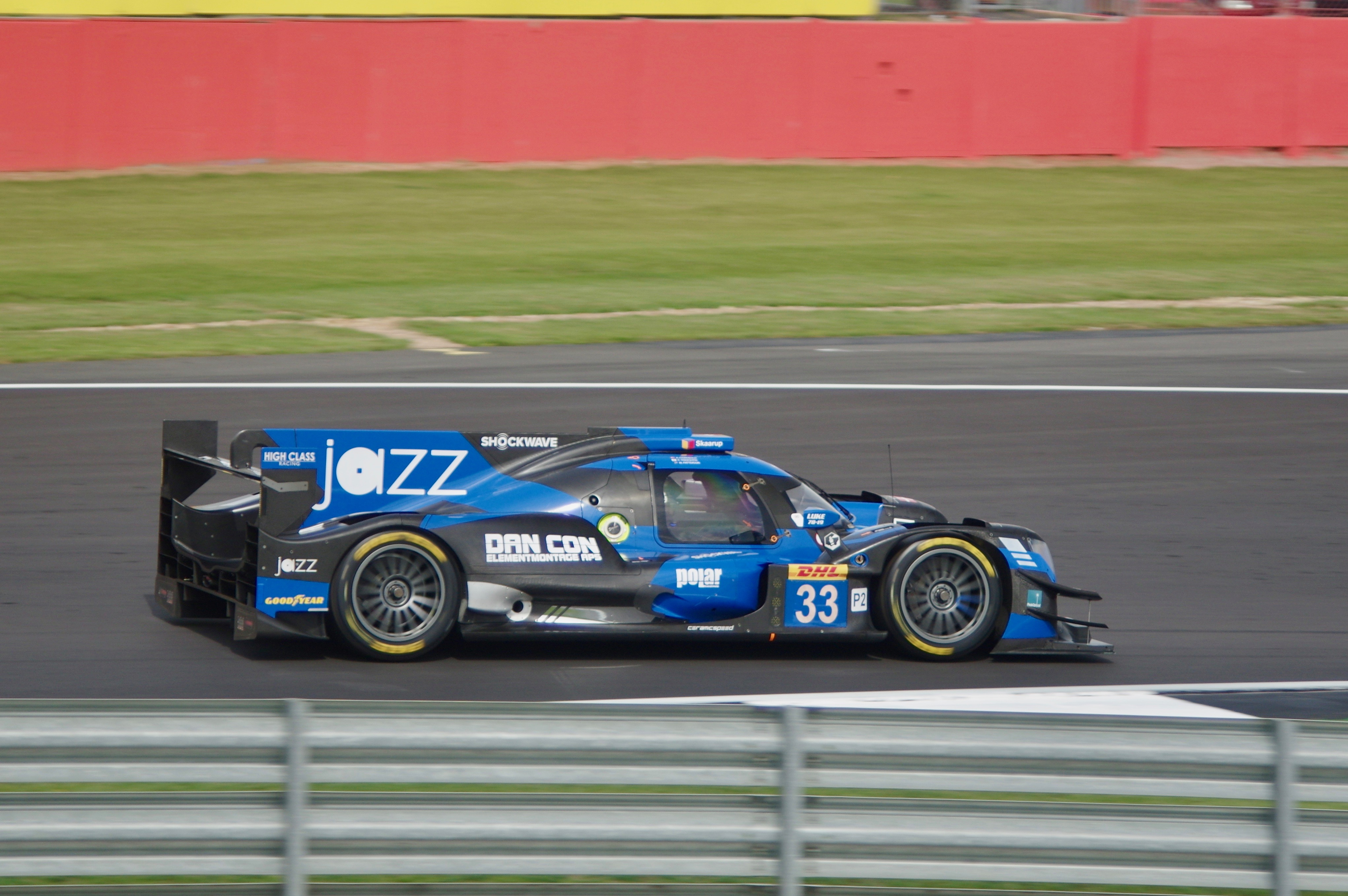
Fjordbach's #33 Oreca at Silverstone in 2019

2019 also presented Fjordbach with his first chance to compete at Le Mans, as High Class Racing were called in off the reserve list to compete in the LMP2 class. The team finished 16th overall, taking 11th place in class. In May of that year, Fjordbach tested the Ginetta G60-LT-P1 at Spa ahead of its re-introduction for the 2019–20 season.

For the 2021 season, Fjordbach had a double racing program with High Class Racing, competing in the World Endurance Championship and joining the team in their return to GT competition, as the team fielded an entry for himself and Mark Patterson in the new GT2 European Series. The duo claimed victory in the series' inaugural race at Monza in April. The following season, Fjordbach piloted the new Brabham BT63 GT2 for the High Class-backed Brabham Automotive Factory Racing team. Driving alongside Kevin Weeda, the team scored their first and only victory of the season at Misano.

== Racing record ==
=== Career summary ===
Season	Series	Team	Races	Wins	Poles	F/Laps	Podiums	Points	Position
2007	Volkswagen Polo Cup Denmark		7	0	0	0	0	30	10th
2007	Yokohama 1600 Challenge Denmark		?	?	?	?	?	111	11th
2008	Volkswagen Polo Cup Denmark		6	0	0	1	0	46	5th
2009	Renault Clio Cup Denmark		12	0	0	0	2	121	6th
2009	ADAC Procar - Division III	High Class Racing	4	0	0	0	0	11	9th
2012	Auto-G Danish Thundersport Challenge		8	0	0	0	0	81	6th
2013	Auto-G Danish Thundersport Championship	Team Polar Seafood Racing	11	0	0	0	2	108	6th
2013	NASCAR Whelen Euro Series	Gonneau Racing by OverDrive	2	0	0	0	0	67	35th
2014	Auto-G Danish Thundersport Championship		13	0	0	0	0	108	11th
2014	Blancpain Endurance Series - Pro-Am	Black Falcon	1	0	0	0	1	24	13th
2014	24 Hours of Nürburgring - SP10	Team Securtal Sorg Rennsport	1	0	?	?	0	N/A	DNF
2015	Blancpain Sprint Series	ISR	10	0	0	0	0	0	NC
2015	Blancpain Endurance Series - Pro	ISR	1	0	0	0	0	0	NC
2015	Blancpain Endurance Series - Pro-Am	Insight Racing Denmark	1	0	0	0	0	0	NC
2015	24H Series - 997	Black Falcon	1	?	?	?	?	?	?
2015	24H Series - 997	MSG Motorsport	1	?	?	?	?	?	?
2015	24H Series - CUP1	Securtal Sorg Rennsport	1	?	?	?	?	?	?
2015	Nürburgring Endurance Series - SP9	Phoenix Racing	3	0	0	0	0	0	NC
2015	24 Hours of Nürburgring - Cup 5	Team Securtal Sorg Rennsport	1	0	?	?	0	N/A	DNF
2016	Nürburgring Endurance Series - SP9	Phoenix Racing	6	2	0	0	3	19.64	**1st**
2016	24 Hours of Nürburgring - SP9	Phoenix Racing	1	0	0	0	0	N/A	DNF
2016	Renault Sport Trophy - Pro	High Class Racing	6	0	0	0	0	13	16th
2016	Renault Sport Trophy - Endurance	High Class Racing	6	0	0	0	0	11	23rd
2016	24H Series - 991	Black Falcon Team TMD Friction	1	0	0	0	1	0	NC
2016	Blancpain GT Series Endurance Cup	GRT Grasser Racing Team	1	0	0	0	0	0	NC
2017	European Le Mans Series - LMP2	High Class Racing	6	0	0	0	2	46	9th
2017	24H Series - 991	Black Falcon Team TMD Friction	1	1	0	0	1	30	?
2017	Touring Car Endurance Series - TCR	Bas Koeten Racing	1	0	0	0	1	0	NC
2018	European Le Mans Series - LMP2	High Class Racing	6	0	0	0	0	5.5	24th
2018	Blancpain GT Series Endurance Cup	Attempto Racing	1	0	0	0	0	0	NC
2018–19	Asian Le Mans Series - LMP2	Algarve Pro Racing	4	0	0	0	0	26	9th
2019	European Le Mans Series - LMP2	High Class Racing	6	0	0	0	0	4	23rd
2019	24 Hours of Le Mans - LMP2	High Class Racing	1	0	0	0	0	N/A	11th
2019	IMSA SportsCar Championship - LMP2	PR1/Mathiasen Motorsports	1	0	0	0	1	32	11th
2019–20	FIA World Endurance Championship - LMP2	High Class Racing	7	0	0	0	0	11	21st
2020	European Le Mans Series - LMP2	High Class Racing	5	0	0	0	1	24	9th
2021	GT2 European Series - Pro-Am	High Class Racing	10	5	3	8	8	201	**1st**
2021	FIA World Endurance Championship - LMP2	High Class Racing	5	0	0	0	0	17	18th
2021	FIA World Endurance Championship - LMP2 Pro-Am	High Class Racing	5	0	0	0	3	85	7th
2021	24 Hours of Le Mans - LMP2	High Class Racing	1	0	0	0	0	N/A	17th
2021	IMSA SportsCar Championship - LMP2	High Class Racing	2	0	0	0	1	0	NC
2021	Le Mans Cup - LMP3	Team Thor	2	0	0	0	0	1	38th
2022	Asian Le Mans Series - LMP2	High Class Racing	4	0	0	1	2	60	**3rd**
2022	IMSA SportsCar Championship - LMP2	High Class Racing	6	0	0	0	1	1500	8th
2022	GT2 European Series - Pro-Am	Brabham Automotive Factory Racing	12	1	4	5	3	140	4th
2022	European Le Mans Series - LMP2	Duqueine Team	1	0	0	0	0	8	19th
2022	Ultimate Cup Series - Proto P3	Team Thor Racing	1	0	0	1	1	18	12th
2022–23	Middle East Trophy - 992	QMMF Racing by HRT Thuraya Qatar							
2023	Le Mans Cup - GT3	HCR with Caffeinesix	7	0	1	1	2	73	**3rd**
2023	IMSA SportsCar Championship - LMP2	High Class Racing	4	0	0	0	0	781	16th
2023	24 Hours of Le Mans - LMP2	Inter Europol Competition	1	0	0	0	0	N/A	DNF
2023–24	Asian Le Mans Series - LMP3	High Class Racing	5	0	2	1	2	56	5th
2024	IMSA SportsCar Championship - GTD	MDK Motorsports	10	0	0	0	0	2129	13th
2024–25	Asian Le Mans Series - LMP3	High Class Racing	6	1	4	0	4	92	4th
2025	Middle East Trophy - GT3	Dinamic GT							
2025	Le Mans Cup - LMP3	High Class Racing	4	0	0	0	0	4	29th
2025	GT World Challenge Asia	Origine Motorsport	11	0	0	0	0	11	33rd
2025	Intercontinental GT Challenge	Origine Motorsport	1	0	0	0	0	0	NC
2025	Porsche Supercup	Hadeca Racing	2	0	0	0	0	0	NC†
2026	Intercontinental GT Challenge	High Class Racing	5	0	0	0	1	24	16th
2026	European Le Mans Series - LMGT3	High Class Racing	4	0	0	0	0	16	22nd
2026	Nürburgring Langstrecken-Serie - SP9	High Class Racing	1	0	0	0	0	0	NC
2026	24 Hours of Nürburgring - SP9 Pro-Am	High Class Racing	1	0	0	0	0	N/A	6th
2026	GT World Challenge Europe Endurance Cup	High Class Racing	1	0	0	0	0	0	NC
2026	GT2 European Series - Pro-Am	High Class Racing							
2026	GT World Challenge America - Pro-Am	High Class Racing	1	0	0	0	0	0	NC
2026	Nürburgring Langstrecken-Serie - SP10	SRS Team Sorg Rennsport	1	0	0	0	0	0	NC
2026–27	Asian Le Mans Series – GT3	High Class Racing						*	*

* Season still in progress

=== Complete GT World Challenge Europe results ===
==== GT World Challenge Europe Endurance Cup ====
(key) (Races in bold indicate pole position; races in italics indicate fastest lap)

Year	Team	Car	Class	1	2	3	4	5	6	7	Pos.	Points
2014	Black Falcon	Mercedes-Benz SLS AMG GT3	Pro-Am	MNZ	SIL	LEC	SPA; 6H	SPA; 12H	SPA; 24H	NÜR; 6	13th	24
2015	ISR	Audi R8 LMS ultra	Pro	MNZ; DNS	SIL; 55	LEC					NC	0
2015	Insight Racing Denmark	Ferrari 458 Italia GT3	Pro-Am				SPA; 6H; 34	SPA; 12H; 40	SPA; 24H; Ret	NÜR	NC	0
2016	GRT Grasser Racing Team	Lamborghini Huracán GT3	Pro-Am	MNZ	SIL	LEC	SPA; 6H; 60	SPA; 12H; 54	SPA; 24H; 42	NÜR	NC	0
2018	Attempto Racing	Audi R8 LMS	Pro	MNZ	SIL	LEC	SPA; 6H	SPA; 12H	SPA; 24H	CAT; 11	NC	0
2026	High Class Racing	Porsche 911 GT3 R (992.2)	Pro-Am	LEC	MNZ	SPA; 6H; 46	SPA; 12H; 39	SPA; 24H; 32	NÜR	ALG	NC	0

==== GT World Challenge Europe Sprint Cup ====
(key) (Races in bold indicate pole position; races in italics indicate fastest lap)

Year	Team	Car	Class	1	2	3	4	5	6	7	8	9	10	11	12	13	14	Pos.	Points
2015	ISR	Audi R8 LMS ultra	Silver	NOG; QR; 7	NOG; CR; 12	BRH; QR; 16	BRH; CR; 15	ZOL; QR; 14	ZOL; CR; 12	MOS; QR	MOS; CR	ALG; QR	ALG; CR	MIS; QR; 11	MIS; CR; 14	ZAN; QR; 14	ZAN; CR; 11	2nd	138

=== Complete European Le Mans Series results ===
(key) (Races in bold indicate pole position; races in italics indicate fastest lap)

Year	Entrant	Class	Chassis	Engine	1	2	3	4	5	6	Pos.	Points
2017	High Class Racing	LMP2	Dallara P217	Gibson GK428 4.2 L V8	SIL; 3	MNZ; 3	RBR; 8	LEC; 9	SPA; 8	ALG; 7	9th	46
2018	High Class Racing	LMP2	Dallara P217	Gibson GK428 4.2 L V8	LEC; 13	MNZ; 14	RBR; 12	SIL; 9	SPA; Ret	ALG; 9	24th	5.5
2019	High Class Racing	LMP2	Oreca 07	Gibson GK428 4.2 L V8	LEC; 9	MNZ; 17	CAT; Ret	SIL; 11	SPA; 15	ALG; 12	23rd	4
2020	High Class Racing	LMP2	Oreca 07	Gibson GK428 4.2 L V8	RIC; Ret	SPA; 13	LEC; 13	MNZ; 3	ALG; 6		9th	24
2022	Duqueine Team	LMP2	Oreca 07	Gibson GK428 4.2 L V8	LEC	IMO	MNZ	CAT; 6	SPA	ALG	19th	8
2026	High Class Racing	LMGT3	Porsche 911 GT3 R (992.2)	Porsche 4.2 L Flat-6	CAT; 11	LEC; 8	IMO; 5	SPA; 9	SIL	ALG	22nd	16

=== Complete IMSA SportsCar Championship results ===
(key) (Races in bold indicate pole position; results in italics indicate fastest lap)

Year	Entrant	Class	Chassis	Engine	1	2	3	4	5	6	7	8	9	10	Pos.	Points
2019	PR1/Mathiasen Motorsports	LMP2	Oreca 07	Gibson GK428 4.2 L V8	DAY	**SEB**; 2	MOH	WGL	MOS	ELK	LGA	PET			11th	32
2021	High Class Racing	LMP2	Oreca 07	Gibson GK428 4.2 L V8	DAY; Ret†	SEB	WGL	WGL	ELK	LGA	PET				NC†	0†
2022	High Class Racing	LMP2	Oreca 07	Gibson GK428 4.2 L V8	DAY; 10†	SEB; 6	LGA; 6	MDO; 3	WGL; 4	ELK	PET; 4				8th	1500
2023	High Class Racing	LMP2	Oreca 07	Gibson GK428 4.2 L V8	DAY; 8†	SEB; 6	LGA	WGL; 8	ELK	IMS	PET; 6				16th	781
2024	MDK Motorsports	GTD	Porsche 911 GT3 R (992)	Porsche 4.2 L Flat-6	DAY; 12	SEB; 12	LBH; 13	LGA; 13	WGL; 8	MOS; 10	ELK; 10	VIR; 10	IMS; 12	PET; 15	13th	2129

^{†} Points only counted towards the Michelin Endurance Cup, and not the overall LMP2 Championship.

=== Complete Asian Le Mans Series results ===
(key) (Races in bold indicate pole position; results in italics indicate fastest lap)

Year	Entrant	Class	Chassis	Engine	1	2	3	4	5	6	Pos.	Points
2018–19	Algarve Pro Racing	LMP2	Ligier JS P2	Judd HK 3.6 L V8	SHA; 5	FUJ; 7	BUR; 5	SEP; Ret			9th	26
2022	High Class Racing	LMP2	Oreca 07	Gibson GK428 4.2 L V8	DUB; 1; 3	DUB; 2; 2	ABU; 1; 4	ABU; 2; 5			3rd	60
2023–24	High Class Racing	LMP3	Ligier JS P320	Nissan VK56DE 5.6 L V8	**SEP**; **1**; 4	**SEP**; **2** Ret	DUB; 3	ABU; 1; 3	ABU; 2; 4		5th	56
2024–25	High Class Racing	LMP3	Ligier JS P320	Nissan VK56DE 5.6 L V8	SEP; 1; 2	SEP; 2; 2	**DUB**; **1**; 4	**DUB**; **2**; 3	**ABU**; **1** Ret	**ABU**; **2**; 1	4th	92

=== Complete FIA World Endurance Championship results ===
(key) (Races in bold indicate pole position; races in italics indicate fastest lap)

Year	Entrant	Class	Chassis	Engine	1	2	3	4	5	6	7	8	Pos.	Points
2019–20	High Class Racing	LMP2	Oreca 07	Gibson GK428 4.2 L V8	SIL; 7	FUJ; 4	SHA; 6	BHR; 7	COA; 7	SPA; 7	LMS; Ret	BHR	13th	47
2021	High Class Racing	LMP2	Oreca 07	Gibson GK428 4.2 L V8	SPA; 9	POR; 12	MNZ; 9	LMS	BHR; 8	BHR; 8			18th	17
2021	High Class Racing	Pro-Am Cup	Oreca 07	Gibson GK428 4.2 L V8	4	3	4		3	3			7th	85

=== Complete 24 Hours of Le Mans results ===
Year	Entrant	Co-Drivers	Car	Class	Laps	Pos.	Class Pos.
2019	(Denmark) High Class Racing	(Denmark) Dennis Andersen (Switzerland) Mathias Beche	Oreca 07-Gibson	LMP2	356	16th	11th
2020	(Denmark) High Class Racing	(United States) Mark Patterson (Japan) Kenta Yamashita	Oreca 07-Gibson	LMP2	88	DNF	DNF
2021	(Denmark) High Class Racing	(Denmark) Jan Magnussen (Denmark) Kevin Magnussen	Oreca 07-Gibson	LMP2	336	29th	17th
2023	(Poland) Inter Europol Competition	(United States) Mark Kvamme (Denmark) Jan Magnussen	Oreca 07-Gibson	LMP2	117	DNF	DNF

=== Complete GT2 European Series results ===
(key) (Races in bold indicate pole position; races in italics indicate fastest lap)

Year	Entrant	Car	Class	1	2	3	4	5	6	7	8	9	10	11	12	Pos.	Points
2021	High Class Racing	Audi R8 LMS GT2	Pro-Am	**MNZ**; **1**; 1	MNZ; 2; 4	HOC; 1; 1	**HOC**; **2**; 1	MIS; 1; 1	MIS; 2; 2	SPA; 1; 5	SPA; 2; 2	LEC; 1; 2	**LEC**; **2**; 1			**1st**	**201**
2022	Brabham Automotive Factory Racing	Brabham BT63 GT2	Pro-Am	IMO; 1; 9	IMO; 2; 6	RBR; 1; 9	RBR; 2; 13	MIS; 1; 1	**MIS**; **2**; 10	SPA; 1; 3	**SPA**; **2**; 2	VAL; 1; 6	**VAL**; **2**; 11†	LEC; 1; 2	**LEC**; **2**; 8†	4th	140

=== Complete Le Mans Cup results ===
(key) (Races in bold indicate pole position; races in italics indicate fastest lap)

Year	Entrant	Class	Car	1	2	3	4	5	6	7	Pos.	Points
2021	Team Thor	LMP3	Ligier JS P320	CAT	RIC	MNZ; 14	LMS	SPA; 19	ALG		32nd	1
2023	HCR with CaffeineSix	GT3	Porsche 911 GT3 R (991.2)	CAT; 4	LMS; 1; 2	LMS; 2; 4	LEC; 9	ARA; 2	SPA; 9	ALG; 6	3rd	73
2025	High Class Racing	LMP3 Pro-Am	Ligier JS P325	CAT; 9	LEC; 11	LMS; 1; 17	LMS; 2; 9	SPA	SIL	ALG	29th	4

=== Complete GT World Challenge Asia results ===
(key) (Races in bold indicate pole position; races in italics indicate fastest lap)

Year	Team	Car	Class	1	2	3	4	5	6	7	8	9	10	11	12	DC	Points
2025	Origine Motorsport	Porsche 911 GT3 R (992)	Silver-Am	SEP; 1; 7	SEP; 2; 7	MAN; 1; 2	MAN; 2 Ret	BUR; 1; 6	BUR; 2; 5	FUJ; 1; 6	FUJ; 2; 1	OKA; 1; 2	OKA; 2; 6	BEI; 1 Ret	**BEI**; **2** DNS	5th	107

Sporting positions
Preceded by Series Founded	GT2 European Series; Pro-Am Class Champion; 2021; With: Mark Patterson	Succeeded by Stienes Longin; Nicolas Saelens
