= High Class Racing =

Danish auto racing team

(Denmark) High Class Racing
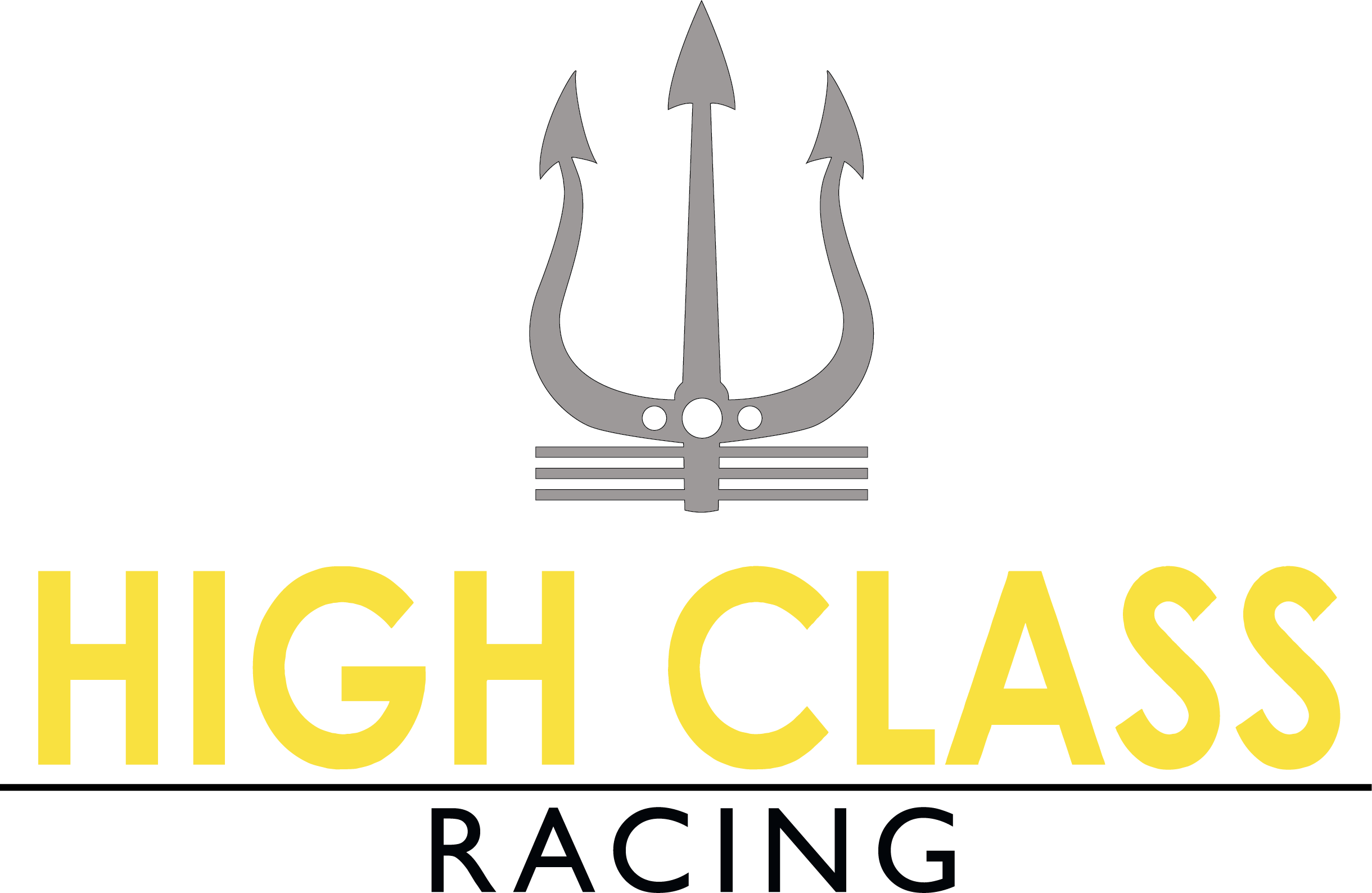
- Founded: 1989
- Base: Vodskov, Denmark (main); L'Ametlla del Vallès, Barcelona, Spain (workshop)
- Team principal(s): Søren Fjordbach; Anders Fjordbach
- Current series: IMSA SportsCar Championship; Asian Le Mans Series; Le Mans Cup
- Former series: FIA World Endurance Championship; European Le Mans Series; Maserati Barchetta Trophy; Renault Spider Cup; Renault Clio V6 Trophy; Formula Renault; Renault Sport Trophy; Intercontinental GT Challenge; GT2 European Series
- Current drivers: (Denmark) Anders Fjordbach (Denmark) Dennis Andersen (United States) Kevin Weeda (Switzerland) Nico Müller (Switzerland) Fabio Scherer (Lithuania) Aurelijus Rusteika (Netherlands) Michael Vergers (Iceland) Auðunn Guðmundsson (Denmark) Michael H. Markussen
- Noted drivers: (Japan) Kenta Yamashita (Switzerland) Mathias Beche (Poland) Robert Kubica (Austria) Ferdinand Habsburg (Denmark) Jan Magnussen (Denmark) Kevin Magnussen (Denmark) Marco Sørensen (United States) Ricky Taylor

High Class Racing is a Danish auto racing team founded in the early 1990s and currently competing in the FIA World Endurance Championship and European Le Mans Series.

== History ==
High Class Racing was founded in the early 1990s initially competing in the Maserati Barchetta Trophy, claiming the title and becoming European Champions in the very first year of racing. The success tied the bonds as a Maserati factory team, with the aim of evolving their GT1 Le Mans project. After a sudden diagnose of Mr. De Tomaso the program was cancelled.

=== Glory times with Renault Sport ===
After the successful period with Maserati, High Class Racing moved on to build a relationship with Renault and was a dominant factor throughout their European Championships. In the late 1990s and early period of the new century, the team claimed titles in both the Renault Spider Cup as well as the Renault Clio V6 Trophy. Furthermore, HCR was a leading team in the Formula Renault.

=== Scandinavian efforts ===
High Class Racing has been competing on the Scandinavian scene for more than 20 years as a top team with prominent drivers such as Tom Kristensen, Kurt Thiim, John Nielsen, Kris Nissen, Jan Magnussen and also a very young Kevin Magnussen. During this period HCR also operated as factory backed NISSAN–McDonald's Racing.

=== Taking it European-wide and globally ===
After many great years with top drivers in national racing, High Class Racing switched back to international level competition with a move to the Renault Sport Trophy in the Renault Sport R.S. 01 in 2016. When the series folded a new chapter was however needed.

=== Endurance and sprint racing ===
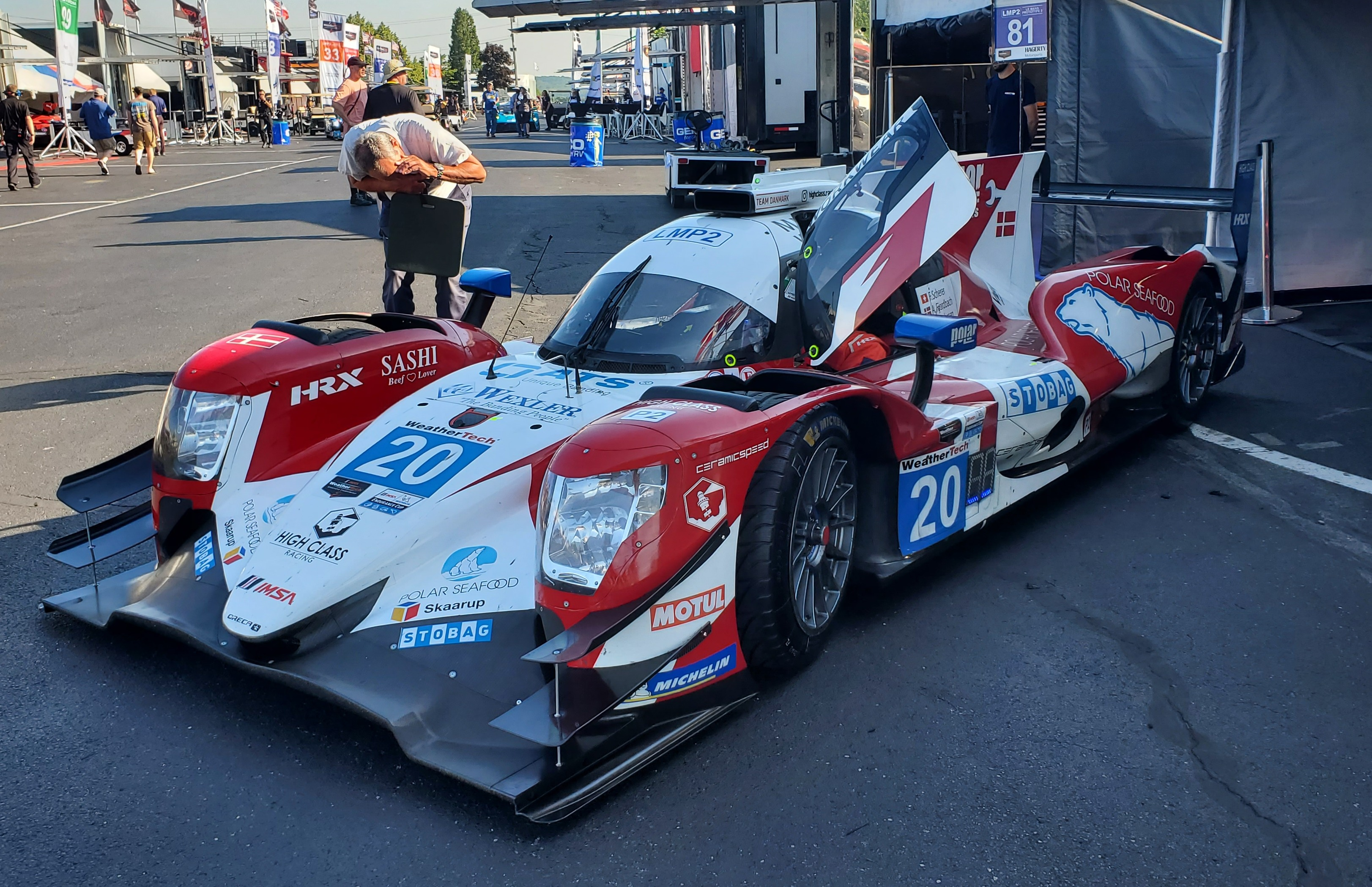
One of High Class Racing's Oreca 07 Gibson

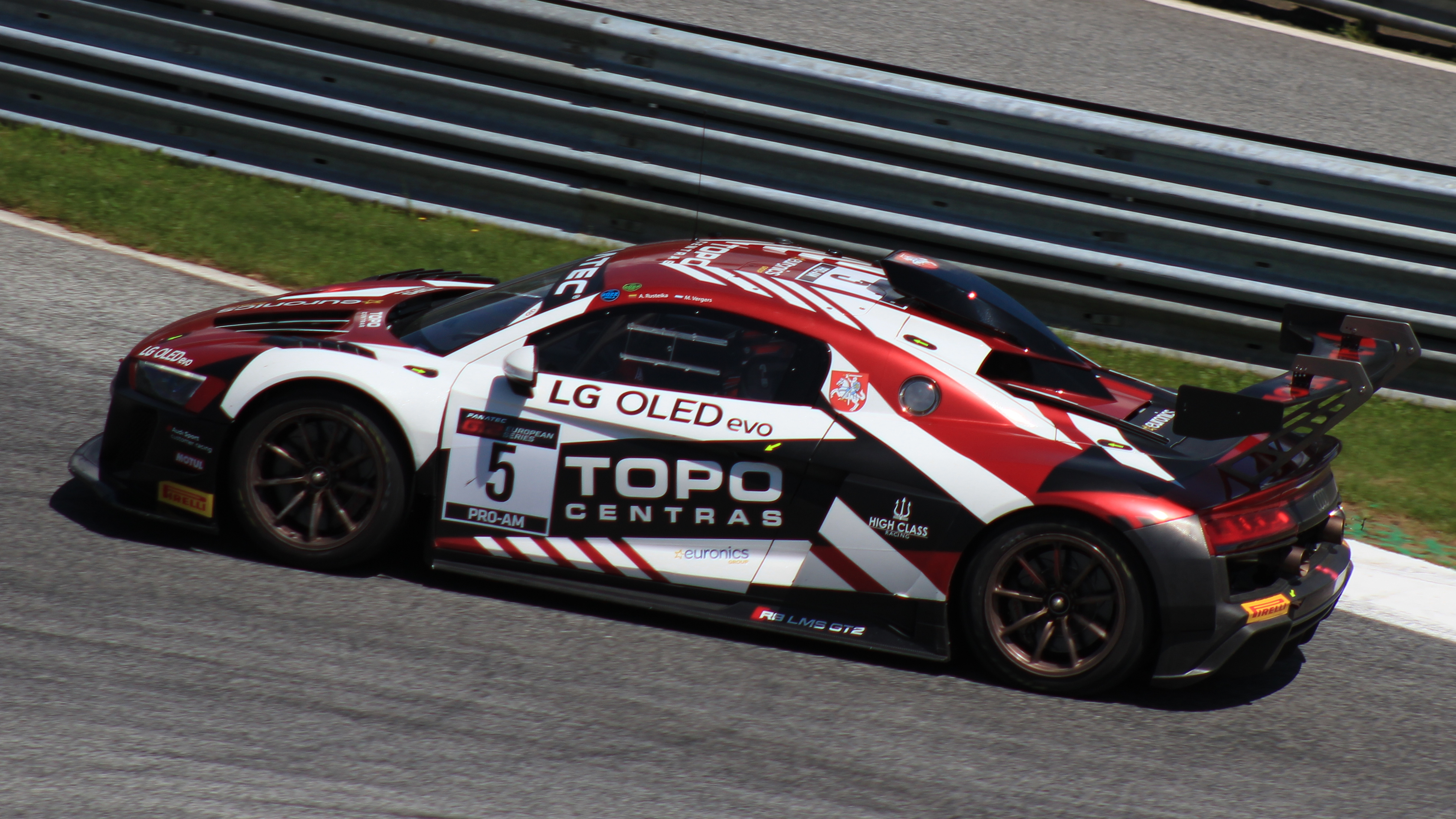
High Class Racing Audi R8 LMS GT2

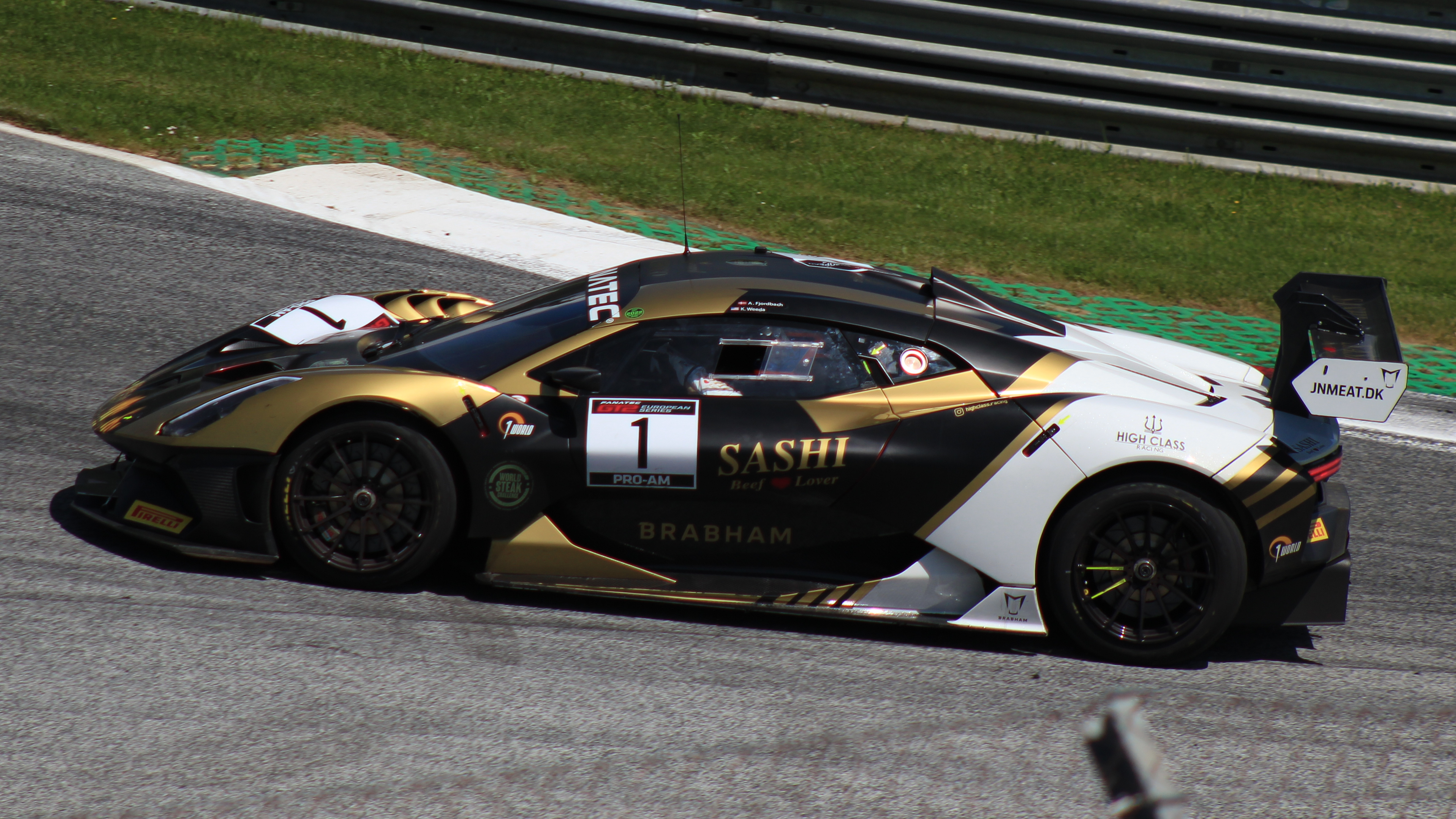
High Class Racing Brabham BT63 GT2

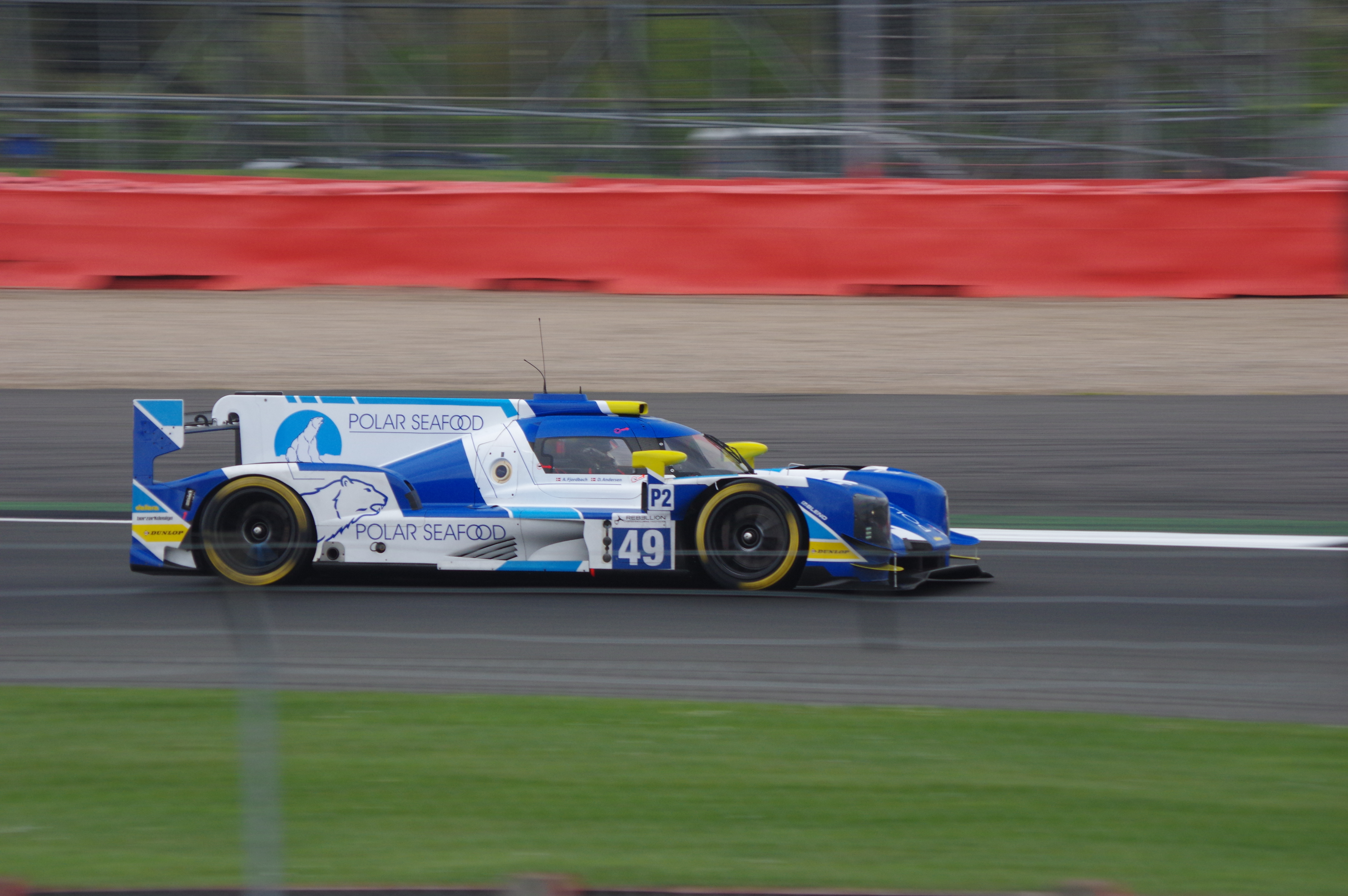
High Class Racing Dallara P217 - Gibson

The team acquired a pair of brand new Dallara P217s and entered the European Le Mans Series in 2017 claiming an overall sixth in their first year of endurance racing, with several podium finishes on their record list. High Class Racing has been a regular entry in the ELMS ever since with a consistent driver lineup, also assisting SMP Racing in their LMP2 program in the ELMS as well as the 2017 24 Hours of Le Mans.

On the other hand, the team confirmed in 2021 a new challenge in the Fanatec GT2 European Series, a championship that forms part of the revitalised SRO's GT Sports Club concept]. The category provides a competitive outlet for the high-power models already produced by Porsche, Audi, KTM and Lamborghini and High Class Racing entered the championship with the new Audi R8 LMS GT2 which uses a 5.2-litre V10 engine designed as a naturally aspirated unit for the first time in the racing version, delivers 470 kW (640 horsepower) and, as a result, offers nearly 30 per cent more power output than in the most powerful version the Audi R8 LMS GT3 to be by far the most powerful sports car in the history of the customer racing program.

The team added a second entry for GT2 European Series Season Finale at Paul Ricard with Dennis Andersen and David Brabham driving the brand new Brabham BT63 GT2 Concept for the first time in an official competition.

High Class Racing was crowned 2021 Fanatec GT2 European Series Champion with 5 wins, 3 Pole Position, 8 podiums & 8 fastest laps in his debut with Anders Fjordbach & Mark Patterson behind the wheel of the Audi R8 LMS GT2.

=== FIA World Endurance Championship and 24 Hours of Le Mans ===
High Class Racing gained a late entry to the 2019 24 Hours of Le Mans. Despite the short preparation time, the team managed to finish in 11th position.

In 2019/2020, after a switch to French prototype manufacturer Oreca, High Class Racing is participating in the (full season) 2020 FIA World Endurance Championship and will furthermore enter the 2020 European Le Mans Series with a second Oreca 07.

The team confirmed later in 2020 an Oreca 07 LMP2 entry for the Rolex 24 Hours of Daytona, which took place on 30–31 January 2021 and then some weeks later former Formula 1 driver and four time 24 Hours of Le Mans winner Jan Magnussen joined High Class Racing regulars Anders Fjordbach and Dennis Andersen as first drivers confirmed for the 2021 FIA World Endurance Championship season. High Class Racing announced a second LMP2-entry ahead of the 2021 24h of Le Mans with Kevin Magnussen as the lead driver. joining his father Jan and Anders Fjordbach in car #49.

After a decent start of 2021 season at 6 Hours of Spa-Francorchamps, the team scored its first-ever WEC podium after finishing P3 in LMP2 ProAm class during 8 Hours of Portimao.

High Class Racing runs an academy for young open wheel and endurance hopefuls, and have international level junior drivers in Formula 4 as well as touring cars.

=== Rolex 24 at Daytona ===
After confirming the debut in 2021 Rolex 24 Hours of Daytona, the team confirmed their driver lineup that will be led by former Formula 1 driver and Canadian Grand Prix winner Robert Kubica, who is currently contracted by Alfa Romeo Racing ORLEN as reserve driver. Kubica will be joined by Austrian DTM-star Ferdinand Habsburg, who completes the strong lineup with High Class Racing regulars Anders Fjordbach and Dennis Andersen.

== Racing record ==
=== 24 Hours of Le Mans results ===
(key) (Races in bold indicate pole position; races in italics indicate fastest lap)

Year	Entrant	No.	Car	Drivers	Class	Laps	Pos.	Class Pos.
2019	(Denmark) High Class Racing	20	Oreca 07 – Gibson	(Denmark) Dennis Andersen (Switzerland) Mathias Beche (Denmark) Anders Fjordbach	LMP2	356	16th	11th
2020	(Denmark) High Class Racing	33	Oreca 07 – Gibson	(Denmark) Anders Fjordbach (United States) Mark Patterson (Japan) Kenta Yamashita	LMP2	88	DNF	DNF
2021	(Denmark) High Class Racing	20	Oreca 07 – Gibson	(Denmark) Dennis Andersen (Denmark) Marco Sørensen (United States) Ricky Taylor	LMP2 (Pro-Am)	353	18th	4th
2021	(Denmark) High Class Racing	49	Oreca 07 – Gibson	(Denmark) Anders Fjordbach (Denmark) Jan Magnussen (Denmark) Kevin Magnussen	LMP2	336	29th	17th

=== Rolex 24 at Daytona results ===
Year	Entrant	No	Car	Class	Drivers	Laps	Pos.	Class Pos.
2021	(Denmark) High Class Racing	20	Oreca 07 – Gibson	LMP2	(Denmark) Anders Fjordbach (Denmark) Dennis Andersen (Poland) Robert Kubica (Austria) Ferdinand Habsburg	56	**Ret**	**Ret**
2022	(Denmark) High Class Racing	20	Oreca 07 – Gibson	LMP2	(Denmark) Anders Fjordbach (Denmark) Dennis Andersen (Switzerland) Nico Müller (Switzerland) Fabio Scherer	345	**Ret**	**Ret**
2023	(Denmark) High Class Racing	20	Oreca 07 – Gibson	LMP2	(Denmark) Anders Fjordbach (Denmark) Dennis Andersen (United Arab Emirates) Ed Jones (Switzerland) Raffaele Marciello	646	**Ret**	**Ret**
2024	(Denmark) MDK by High Class Racing	20	Oreca 07 – Gibson	LMP2	(Denmark) Dennis Andersen (Germany) Laurents Hörr (United States) Seth Lucas (United States) Scott Huffaker	185	**Ret**	**Ret**

=== World Endurance Championship results ===
Year	Entrant	No	Car	Class	Drivers	1	2	3	4	5	6	7	8	Points	Pos.
2019–20	(Denmark) High Class Racing	33	Oreca 07 – Gibson	LMP2	(Denmark) Anders Fjordbach (Japan) Kenta Yamashita (South Africa) Mark Patterson	SIL 7	FUJ 4	SHA 6	BHR 7	COA 7	SPA 7	LMS Ret	BHR	**47**	**8th**
2021	(Denmark) High Class Racing	20	Oreca 07 – Gibson	LMP2	(Poland) Robert Kubica** (Denmark) Anders Fjordbach* (Denmark) Jan Magnussen* (Denmark) Dennis Andersen	SPA 9	POR 12	MNZ 9	LMS 13	BHR 8	BHR 8			**25**	**10th**

* Anders Fjordbach and Jan Magnussen didn't race with this car in 2021 24 Hours of Le Mans. Anders still sharing the #20 Oreca 07-Gibson with Dennis Andersen for the rest of the season

** Robert Kubica joined the team for season finale double-header in Bahrain replacing Jan Magnussen

=== World Endurance Championship LMP2 Pro/Am results ===
Year	Entrant	No	Car	Class	Drivers	1	2	3	4	5	6	Points	Pos.
2021	(Denmark) High Class Racing	20	Oreca 07 – Gibson	LMP2	(Poland) Robert Kubica** (Denmark) Anders Fjordbach* (Denmark) Jan Magnussen* (Denmark) Dennis Andersen	SPA 4	POR 3	MNZ 4	LMS 4	BHR 3	BHR 3	**109**	**4th**

* Anders Fjordbach and Jan Magnussen didn't race with this car in 2021 24 Hours of Le Mans. Anders still sharing the #20 Oreca 07-Gibson with Dennis Andersen for the rest of the season

** Robert Kubica joined the team for season finale double-header in Bahrain replacing Jan Magnussen

=== IMSA SportsCar Championship results ===
Year	Entrant	No	Car	Class	Drivers	DAY ^{‡}		SEB	LGA	MOH	WGL	ELK	ATL	Points	MEC**
Year	Entrant	No	Car	Class	Drivers	Q	R	SEB	LGA	MOH	WGL	ELK	ATL	Points	MEC**
2022	(Denmark) High Class Racing	20	Oreca 07 - Gibson	LMP2	(Denmark) Anders Fjordbach (Denmark) Dennis Andersen (Switzerland) Nico Müller (Switzerland) Fabio Scherer	4	9	6	6	3	4	3	4	1828	33

** MEC - Michelin Endurance Cup.

‡ Points only awarded towards Michelin Endurance Cup championship

=== GT2 European Series results - ProAm Class ===
Year	Entrant	No	Car	Drivers	1		2		3		4		5		6		Points	Pos
2021	(Denmark) High Class Racing	33	Audi R8 GT2	(Denmark) Anders Fjordbach (South Africa) Mark Patterson	MNZ 1 **1**	MNZ 2 4	HOC 1 1	HOC 2 **1**	MIS 1 1	MIS 2 2	SPA 1 5	SPA 2 2	RIC 1 2	RIC 2 **1**			**201**	**1st**
2022	(Denmark) High Class Racing	1	Brabham BT63 GT2 Concept	(Denmark) Anders Fjordbach (United States) Kevin Weeda	IMO 1 5	IMO 2 4	RBR 1 5	RBR 2 7	MIS 1 1	MIS 2 **6**	SPA 1 3	SPA 2 **2**	VAL 1 5	VAL 2 **6†**	RIC 1 2	RIC 2 **4†**	**140**	**4th**
2022	(Denmark) High Class Racing	5	Audi R8 GT2	(Lithuania) Aurelijus Rusteika (Netherlands) Michael Vergers	IMO 1 1	IMO 2 2	RBR 1 Ret	RBR 2 6	MIS 1 4	MIS 2 5	SPA 1 4	SPA 2 4	VAL 1 6	VAL 2 3	RIC 1 5	RIC 2 3†	**137**	**5th**

=== Asian Le Mans Series results ===
Year	Entrant	No	Car	Class	Drivers	1		2		Points	Pos
2022	(Denmark) High Class Racing	49	Oreca 07 - Gibson	LMP2 Am	(Denmark) Anders Fjordbach (Denmark) Dennis Andersen (United States) Kevin Weeda	DUB 1 2	DUB 2 1	ABU 1 2	ABU 2 3	**73**	**2nd**

=== European Le Mans Series results ===
Year	Entrant	No.	Car	Class	Drivers	1	2	3	4	5	6	Points	Pos
2017	(Denmark) High Class Racing	49	Dallara P217	LMP2	(Denmark) Anders Fjordbach (Denmark) Dennis Andersen	SIL 3	MNZ 3	RBR 8	LEC 9	SPA 8	POR 8	**46**	**6th**
2018	(Denmark) High Class Racing	49	Dallara P217	LMP2	(Denmark) Anders Fjordbach (Denmark) Dennis Andersen	LEC 13	MNZ 14	RBR 12	SIL 9	SPA Ret	POR 9	**5.5**	**16th**
2019	(Denmark) High Class Racing	20	Oreca 07 – Gibson	LMP2	(Denmark) Anders Fjordbach (Denmark) Dennis Andersen	LEC 9	MNZ 17	BAR Ret	SIL 11	SPA 15	POR 12	**4**	**14th**
2020	(Denmark) High Class Racing	20	Oreca 07 – Gibson	LMP2	(Denmark) Anders Fjordbach (Denmark) Dennis Andersen	RIC Ret	SPA 13	LEC 13	MNZ 3	POR 6		**24**	**8th**
