= Capone Motorsports =

American auto racing team

(United States) Capone Motorsports (Canada) Tower Motorsports
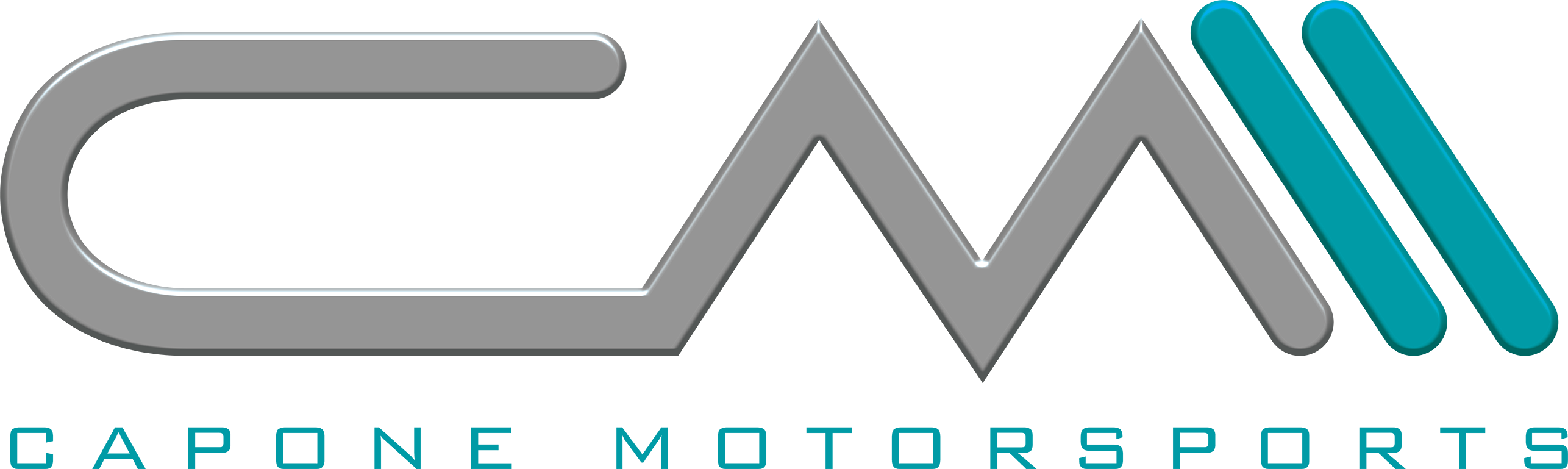
- Founded: 2019; 7 years ago
- Founder(s): Ricky Capone
- Base: Riviera Beach, Florida, United States
- Team principal(s): Ricky Capone (owner)
- Current series: IMSA SportsCar Championship
- Current drivers: IMSA SportsCar Championship: 8. (Mexico) Sebastián Álvarez (France) Sébastien Bourdais (Canada) John Farano (Netherlands) Job van Uitert
- Drivers' Championships: IMSA SportsCar Championship - LMP2: 2022
- Website: http://www.caponemotorsports.com/

Capone Motorsports is an American auto racing team that currently competes in the LMP2 class of the IMSA SportsCar Championship, doing business as Tower Motorsports. The team was founded in 2019 by American businessman and race mechanic Ricky Capone.

== History ==
Capone Motorsports was founded in 2019 by American businessman and race mechanic Ricky Capone. In 2011, Capone joined Extreme Speed Motorsports as a gearbox mechanic. He would move his way up in the organization, eventually becoming the team's shop foreman. Following ESM's closure in 2018, Capone opened his own shop and team, offering consulting services to other professional motorsports teams. This shop would eventually formalize and become Capone Motorsports.

The team currently runs and operates the No. 8 Tower Motorsports LMP2 entry in the IMSA SportsCar Championship, sponsored by Canadian businessman and racecar driver John Farano via his company Tower Events. Besides its professional sports car activities, Capone is involved in club and historic racing, and is the exclusive distributor of Funyo prototypes in the United States.

=== IMSA SportsCar Championship ===
==== 2021 ====
Midway through the 2020 IMSA SportsCar Championship, Capone and his team worked with Peter Baron and his team Starworks Motorsport in the fifth race of the season at Petit Le Mans. Following Baron and Starworks' LMP2 class win in the race, Baron and Capone established a deal in which the No. 8 Tower Motorsport by Starworks Motorsport team would be run out of the Capone Motorsports shop. The entry would still compete as the No. 8 Tower Motorsport by Starworks Motorsport in the LMP2 class. This marked Capone Motorsports' first auto racing program in the team's history. The team would do the full season with Farano and Gabriel Aubry. Timothé Buret and Matthieu Vaxivière completed their Michelin Endurance Cup lineup. They had a good debut to the season, as they finished second in the 2021 24 Hours of Daytona. However, their fortunes would quickly turn as they retired in the following two races at Sebring and Watkins Glen. Since there were only five cars in the LMP2 class at Sebring, the No. 8 was still credited with a third place finish as they still finished ahead of the WIN Autosport and United Autosports LMP2 cars. At Watkins Glen, an accident cut the No. 8's race short and they were credited with a fourth place finish. The No. 8's form quickly turned around as they got three podiums in a row at Watkins Glen, Road America, and Laguna Seca respectively. Going into the final race of the season at the 2021 Petit Le Mans, the No. 8 qualified fourth in its class. During the end of the race, the team was battling with the No. 52 PR1/Mathiasen Motorsports car for the win. The No. 52 would cross the finish line in first place ahead of the No. 8 in second. However, a post race drive-through equivalent time penalty was given to the No. 52 for contact in the closing minutes of the race. Thus, the No. 8 was given the LMP2 class win in the 2021 Petit Le Mans. The No. 8 would finish third in the LMP2 standings.

==== 2022 ====
Ahead of the 2022 season, Capone Motorsports took over full running of the No. 8 team from Peter Baron and Starworks Motorsport. The team would continue to compete in LMP2 and would be entered as Tower Motorsports. They would sign Louis Delétraz to contest the full season alongside John Farano. Rui Andrade would be signed to race in the Michelin Endurance Cup rounds, and Ferdinand Habsburg signed to compete at the season opening 24 Hours of Daytona.

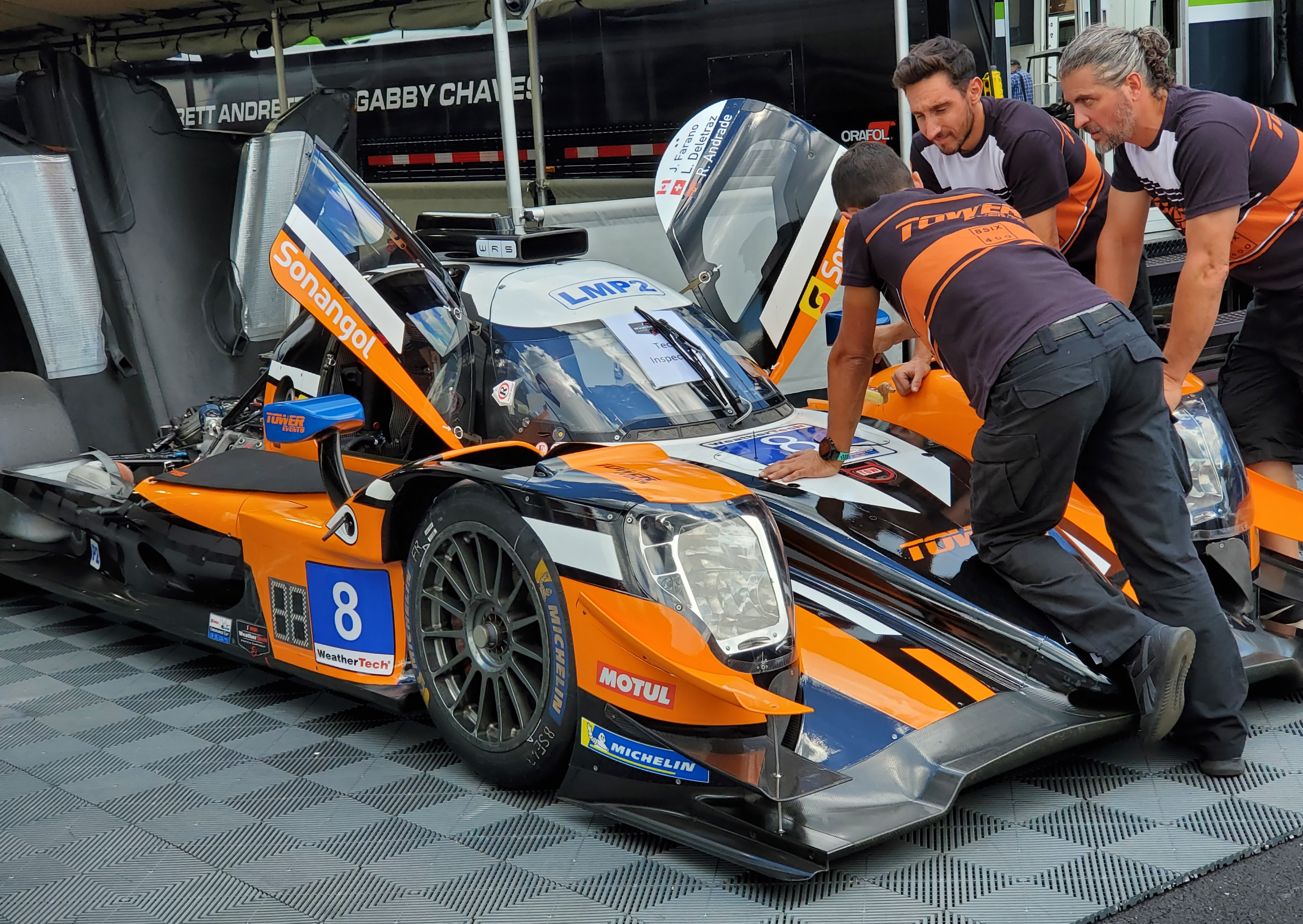
Tower Motorsport's Oreca 07 in the paddock at the Watkins Glen

The team got their first win of the season at Laguna Seca finishing ahead of the No. 18 Era Motorsports car. The win moved No. 8 from 9th in the LMP2 standings to 2nd, 33 points behind the No. 18 in first. A fourth place in the following round at Mid-Ohio dropped the team to fifth in the LMP2 standings. For the fifth round held at Watkins Glen, the team drafted in Will Stevens as a substitute for Delétraz. Tower finished on the podium in second that race, which moved the team back up to second in the championship. Delétraz returned to the car the next race at Road America and contributed to a second place finish alongside Farano. This result allowed them a shot at the LMP2 championship as they were just 19 points behind championship leader PR1/Mathiasen Motorsports. In the final round of the season at Road Atlanta, Farano qualified the car fourth in class, while the No. 52 PR1/Mathiasen Motorsports car qualified just ahead in third with Ben Keating behind the wheel. The No. 8 car would be in contention for a majority of the race, and would be in second with just a half hour remaining in the race. Delétraz, who was behind the wheel of the No. 8 at this point, made the move for the lead passing Juan Pablo Montoya in the No. 81 DragonSpeed car. From that point on, Delétraz would keep the lead and win the race. This would be a historic win for the team too, as this was the No. 8 car's third Petit Le Mans win in a row. With the team finishing in first and title rival PR1/Mathiasen Motorsports retiring early in the race due to an accident, the No. 8 crew would also win the 2022 IMSA SportsCar LMP2 championship, 126 points ahead of the No. 52. This was the organization's first championship in its history.

==== 2023 ====
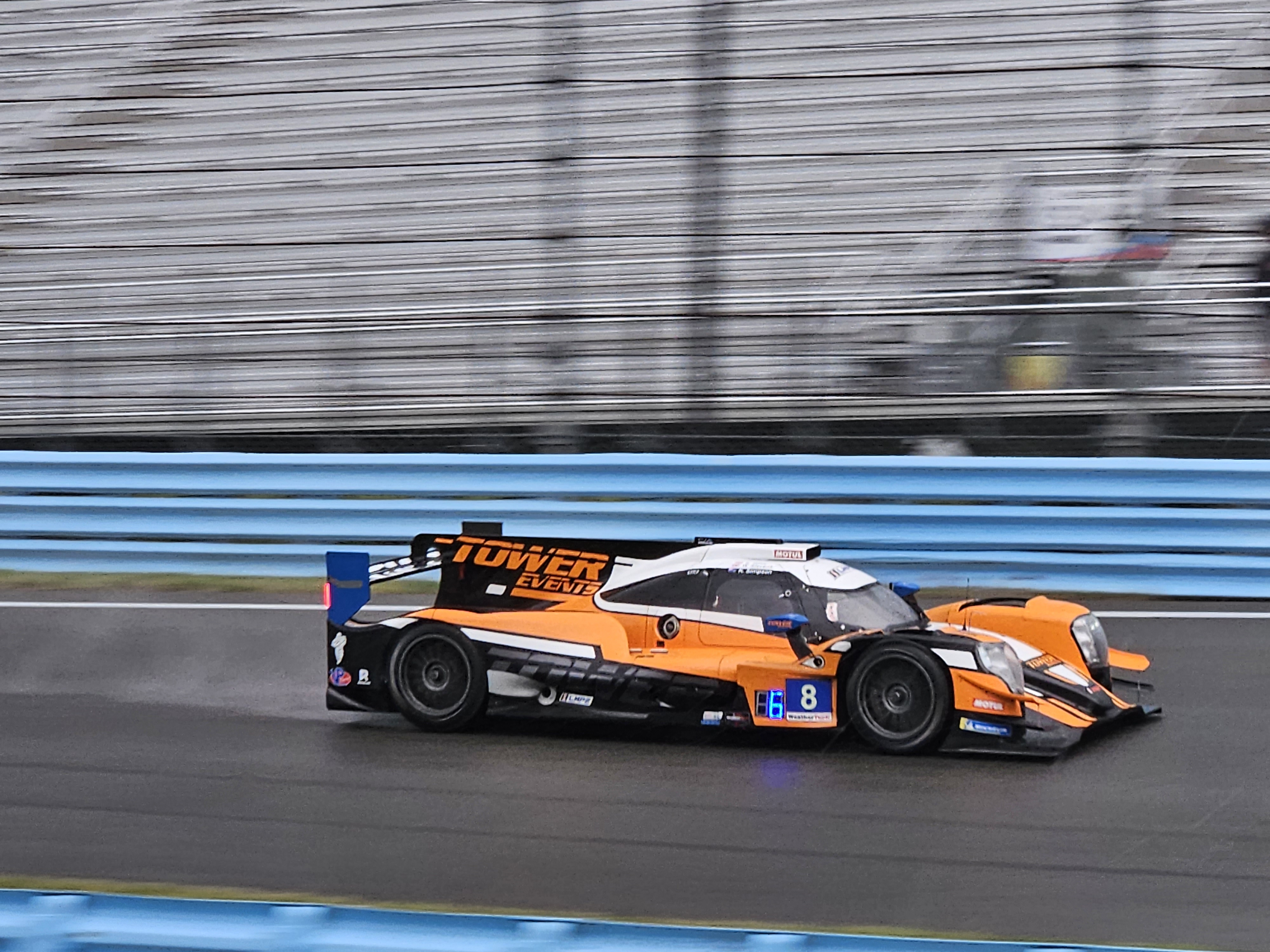
Tower Motorsports' No. 8 Oreca 07 at Watkins Glen

The team returned for the 2023 season, once again fielding the No. 8 Tower Motorsports car in LMP2. John Farano was brought back for a third season and was joined by Kyffin Simpson, as well as IndyCar drivers Scott McLaughlin and Josef Newgarden for the Rolex 24. In the second race of the season at the 12 Hours of Sebring, the team won their first race of the season with Farano, McLaughlin, and Simpson. The team brought back 2022 LMP2 champion Louis Delétraz to compete with Farano in the sprint races of the championship. During round 4 at Laguna Seca, Farano had a large accident in turn 5, and was later transported to the hospital. Due to his accident, it was unclear if he would be compete in the next race. Ahead of round 5 at Watkins Glen, FIA WEC driver Will Stevens was brought in to drive the No. 8 in the race alongside Farano and Simpson. However, due to Farano's injuries, the team signed Salih Yoluç to fill Farano's seat for the race. Ultimately, Farano would not return to the car for the remainder of the season as he continued his recovery. Rodrigo Sales was brought in to fill Farano's seat at Road America. In Indianapolis, Dan Goldburg fulfilled the role of being the mandatory FIA Bronze rated driver, and drove alongside Delétraz. The pair would have good fortunes as they finished second in the race. For the final race of the season, the team brought in their fifth different Bronze rated driver for the season in Ari Balogh. Kyffin Simpson and Scott McLaughlin returned to the team for the final race alongside Balogh. The No. 8 would have a mixed season with one win and two podiums, but finishing fifth in the LMP2 standings.

==== 2024 ====
Following his accident in the season prior, John Farano returned to the No. 8 for the full 2024 IMSA SportsCar Championship. The team would once again have a rotating cast of drivers throughout the season. For the 2024 24 Hours of Daytona, they signed Michael Dinan, Ferdinand Habsburg, and Scott McLaughlin to drive the No. 8 alongside Farano. Charlie Eastwood would drive with the team at Sebring, Watkins Glen, Road America, and Indianapolis. In the first three races of the season, the team has average results, with a best result of fifth at Daytona. For round seven at Mosport, they brought in Cadillac Racing driver Renger van der Zande to drive with Farano. The rest of the season didn't see much success either, with two more sixth places and an eighth at Indianapolis. At Petit Le Mans, Sebastián Álvarez and Frederik Vesti were brought in to drive the No. 8 with Farano. The trio would finish seventh in the race. Overall, the No. 8 team had a fairly difficult season, not finishing on the podium once and finishing ninth in the LMP2 standings.

== Racing record ==
=== Complete 24 Hours of Le Mans results ===
Year	Entrant	No.	Car	Drivers	Class	Laps	Pos.	Class Pos.
2019	(United Kingdom) RLR MSport/Tower Events	43	Oreca 07-Gibson	(Canada) John Farano (India) Arjun Maini (France) Norman Nato	LMP2	295	NC	NC
2023	(Canada) Tower Motorsports	13	Oreca 07-Gibson	(Germany) René Rast (United States) Ricky Taylor (United States) Steven Thomas	LMP2 (Pro-Am)	19	DNF	DNF
2026	(Luxembourg) DKR Engineering	3	Oreca 07-Gibson	(Mexico) Sebastián Álvarez (Canada) John Farano (Netherlands) Renger van der Zande	LMP2 (Pro-Am)	344	31st	9th

=== Complete IMSA SportsCar Championship results ===
(key) (Races in bold indicate pole position; races in italics indicate fastest lap)

Year	Entrant	Class	No	Chassis	Engine	Drivers	1	2	3	4	5	6	7	Pos.	Pts
2020	(United States) Tower Motorsport by Starworks	LMP2	8	Oreca 07	Gibson GK428 4.2 L V8	(Canada) John Farano (United Kingdom) Ryan Dalziel (Denmark) David Heinemeier Hansson (France) Nicolas Lapierre (Denmark) Mikkel Jensen (Netherlands) Job van Uitert	DAY; 4†	SEB; 1; 4	ELK	ATL; 1	ATL; 2; 1	LGA	SEB; 2; 2	3rd	95
2021	(United States) Tower Motorsport by Starworks	LMP2	8	Oreca 07	Gibson GK428 4.2 L V8	(France) Gabriel Aubry (Canada) John Farano (France) Timothé Buret (France) Matthieu Vaxivière (United States) James French	DAY; 2†	SEB; 3	WGL; 1; 4	WGL; 2; 3	ELK; 2	LGA; 2	ATL; 1	3rd	2012
2022	(Canada) Tower Motorsport	LMP2	8	Oreca 07	Gibson GK428 4.2 L V8	(Canada) John Farano (Switzerland) Louis Delétraz (Portugal) Rui Andrade (Austria) Ferdinand Habsburg (United Kingdom) Will Stevens	DAY; 3†	SEB; 7	LGA; 1	MOH; 4	WGL; 2	ELK; 2	ATL; 1	1st	2018
2023	(Canada) Tower Motorsports	LMP2	8	Oreca 07	Gibson GK428 4.2 L V8	(Barbados) Kyffin Simpson (Canada) John Farano (New Zealand) Scott McLaughlin (Switzerland) Louis Delétraz (United States) Josef Newgarden (United Kingdom) Will Stevens (Turkey) Salih Yoluç (United States) Rodrigo Sales (United States) Dan Goldburg (United States) Ari Balogh	DAY; 5	SEB; 1	LGA; 8	WGL; 5	ELK; 4	IMS; 2	ATL; 7	5th	1811
2024	(Canada) Tower Motorsports	LMP2	8	Oreca 07	Gibson GK428 4.2 L V8	(Canada) John Farano (Republic of Ireland) Charlie Eastwood (United States) Michael Dinan (Austria) Ferdinand Habsburg (New Zealand) Scott McLaughlin (Netherlands) Renger van der Zande (Mexico) Sebastián Álvarez (Denmark) Frederik Vesti	DAY; 5	SEB; 12	WGL; 6	MOS; 6	ELK; 6	IMS; 8	ATL; 5	9th	1833
2025	(Canada) Tower Motorsports	LMP2	8	Oreca 07	Gibson GK428 4.2 L V8	(Mexico) Sebastián Álvarez (France) Sébastien Bourdais (Canada) John Farano (Netherlands) Job van Uitert (Netherlands) Renger van der Zande	DAY; 12	SEB; 2	WGL; 9	MOS; 9	ELK; 7	IMS; 7	ATL; 12	10th	1757

^{*} Season still in progress.
