= John Farano =

Canadian racing driver (born 1959)

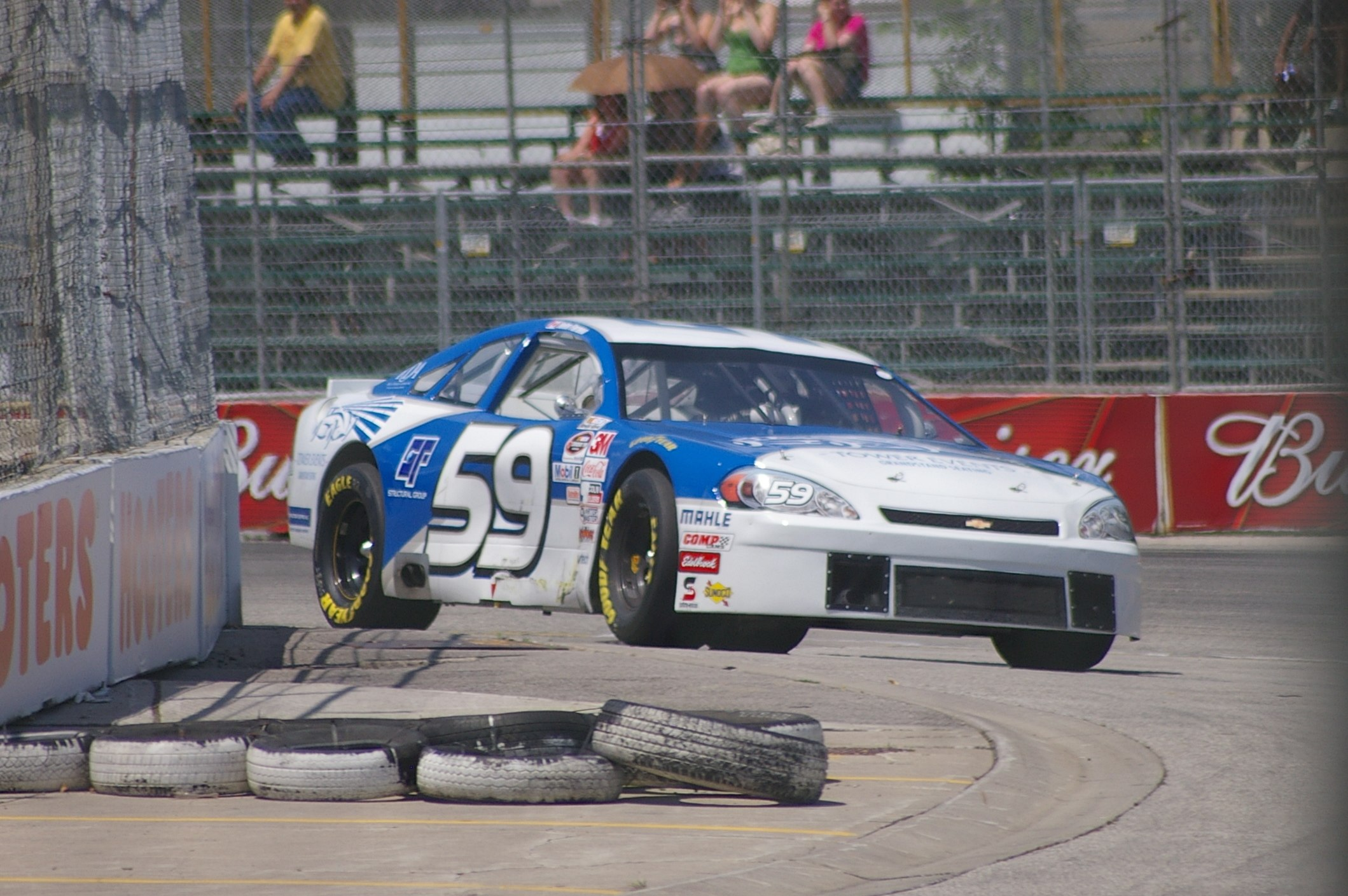
- Nationality: (Canada) Canadian
- Born: December 8, 1959 (age 66) Toronto, Ontario, Canada

IMSA SportsCar Championship career
- Debut season: 2020
- Current team: Tower Motorsports
- Categorisation: FIA Silver (until 2016); FIA Bronze (2017–)
- Car number: 8
- Starts: 41 (41 entries)
- Wins: 5
- Podiums: 15
- Poles: 0
- Fastest laps: 0
- Best finish: 1st (LMP2) in 2022

Awards
- 2022: Jim Trueman Award

John Farano (born 8 December 1959) is a Canadian businessman and racing driver currently competing in the IMSA SportsCar Championship with Tower Motorsports. He is the series' 2022 LMP2 drivers' champion.

== Racing record ==
=== Racing career summary ===
Season	Series	Team	Races	Wins	Poles	F/Laps	Podiums	Points	Position
2007	Ferrari F430 Challenge Pirelli Trophy USA	N/A	?	?	?	?	?	132	4th
2008	Grand-Am Rolex Sports Car Series - GT	Blackforest Motorsports	3	0	0	0	0	38	60th
2009	Grand-Am Rolex Sports Car Series - DP	AIM Autosport	2	0	0	0	0	17	55th
2010	NASCAR Canadian Tire Series	N/A	4	0	0	0	0	473	24th
2011	NASCAR Canadian Tire Series	Tower Motorsports	6	0	0	0	0	728	20th
2011	Ferrari Challenge North America - F430 Challenge	Algar Ferrari	1	1	0	0	1	0	NC†
2012	IMSA Sports Car Challenge - Grand Sport	BGB Motorsports	11	0	0	0	3	264	**1st**
2013	Ferrari Challenge North America - 458 Challenge - Trofeo Pirelli	The Auto Gallery	12	3	2	0	5	136	**2nd**
2013	IMSA Sports Car Challenge - Grand Sport	Multimatic Motorsports	4	0	0	0	2	89	34th
2013	Grand-Am Sports Car Series - GT	APR Motorsport LTD.UK	1	0	0	0	0	0	NC†
2014	IMSA Sports Car Challenge - Grand Sport	Tower Motorsports	9	0	0	0	0	136	27th
2014	Lamborghini Super Trofeo USA	DragonSpeed	10	1	0	0	4	64	4th
2014	United Sports Car Championship - GTD	Scuderia Corsa	1	0	0	0	0	20	82nd
2014	Ferrari Challenge North America - Trofeo Pirelli	Ferrari of Beverly Hills	4	0	0	0	0	20	18th
2014	Ferrari Challenge World Final - Trofeo Pirelli Am	Ferrari of San Francisco	1	0	0	0	0	N/A	DNF
2015	Ferrari Challenge Europe - Trofeo Pirelli	Rossocorsa	4	0	0	0	0	30	7th
2015	Ferrari Challenge North America - Trofeo Pirelli	Ferrari of Fort Lauderdale	14	0	1	0	10	136	**3rd**
2015	Ferrari Challenge World Final - Trofeo Pirelli	Ferrari of Fort Lauderdale	1	0	0	0	0	N/A	12th
2016	Ferrari Challenge Europe - Trofeo Pirelli Am	Rossocorsa	11	0	0	0	5	117	**3rd**
2016	Ferrari Challenge World Final - Trofeo Pirelli Am	Rossocorsa	1	0	0	0	0	N/A	DNF
2016	NASCAR Canadian Tire Series	N/A	1	0	0	0	0	21	54th
2017	European Le Mans Series - LMP3	RLR MSport	6	0	0	0	0	25	13th
2017	Le Mans Cup - LMP3	RLR MSport	2	0	0	0	0	5	28th
2017	Touring Car Endurance Series - A3	Cor Euser Racing							
2018	European Le Mans Series - LMP3	RLR MSport	6	2	0	0	3	77.5	**1st**
2018	Le Mans Cup - LMP3	RLR MSport	7	0	0	0	1	29.5	9th
2018	Ferrari Challenge North America - 458 Challenge	Ferrari of Ontario	2	1	1	0	2	34	9th
2019	European Le Mans Series - LMP2	RLR MSport	6	0	0	0	0	5.5	21st
2019	24 Hours of Le Mans - LMP2	RLR MSport	1	0	0	0	0	N/A	NC
2019	Ferrari Challenge Europe - Coppa Shell - Pro-Am	Rossocorsa	2	0	0	0	1	14	14th
2019–20	Asian Le Mans Series - LMP2 Am	RLR MSport	2	1	0	0	1	26	5th
2020	IMSA SportsCar Championship - LMP2	Tower Motorsport by Starworks	4	1	0	0	2	95	4th
2021	IMSA SportsCar Championship - LMP2	Tower Motorsport by Starworks	8	1	0	0	6	2012	**3rd**
2022	IMSA SportsCar Championship - LMP2	Tower Motorsport	8	2	0	0	5	2018	**1st**
2023	IMSA SportsCar Championship - LMP2	Tower Motorsports	3	1	0	0	1	629	19th
2024	IMSA SportsCar Championship - LMP2	Tower Motorsports	7	0	0	0	0	1833	9th
2025	IMSA SportsCar Championship - LMP2	Tower Motorsports	7	0	0	0	1	1757	13th
2026	IMSA SportsCar Championship - LMP2	Tower Motorsports	7	0	0	0	1	1967	6th
2026	24 Hours of Le Mans - LMP2 Pro-Am	DKR Engineering	1	0	0	0	0	N/A	9th

^{†} As Farano was a guest driver, he was ineligible to score points.

=== Complete European Le Mans Series results ===
(key) (Races in bold indicate pole position; results in italics indicate fastest lap)

Year	Entrant	Class	Chassis	Engine	1	2	3	4	5	6	Rank	Points
2017	RLR MSport	LMP3	Ligier JS P3	Nissan VK50VE 5.0 L V8	SIL; 19	MNZ; 20	RBR; 21	LEC; 20	SPA; 23	ALG; 16	13th	25
2018	RLR MSport	LMP3	Ligier JS P3	Nissan VK50VE 5.0 L V8	LEC; 1	MNZ; 11	RBR; 1	SIL; 6	SPA; 2	ALG; 5	1st	77.5
2019	RLR MSport	LMP2	Oreca 07	Gibson GK428 4.2 L V8	LEC; 8	MNZ; Ret	CAT; 13	SIL; Ret	SPA; 14	ALG; 15	21st	5.5

=== Complete IMSA SportsCar Championship results ===
(key) (Races in bold indicate pole position; races in italics indicate fastest lap)

Year	Entrant	Class	Make	Engine	1	2	3	4	5	6	7	8	9	10	11	Rank	Points	Ref
2014	Scuderia Corsa	GTD	Ferrari 458 Italia GT3	Ferrari F136 4.5 L V8	DAY; 14	SEB	LGA	DET	WGL	MOS	IND	ELK	VIR	COA	PET	82nd	20	
2020	Tower Motorsport by Starworks	LMP2	Oreca 07	Gibson GK428 4.2 L V8	DAY; 4†	SEB; 4	ELK	ATL	PET; 1	LGA	SEB; 2					4th	95	
2021	Tower Motorsport by Starworks	LMP2	Oreca 07	Gibson GK428 4.2 L V8	DAY; 2†	SEB; 3	WGL; 4	WGL; 3	ELK; 2	LGA; 2	PET; 1					3rd	2012	
2022	Tower Motorsport	LMP2	Oreca 07	Gibson GK428 4.2 L V8	DAY; 3†	SEB; 7	LGA; 1	MOH; 4	WGL; 2	ELK; 2	PET; 1					1st	2018	
2023	Tower Motorsports	LMP2	Oreca 07	Gibson GK428 4.2 L V8	DAY; 5†	SEB; 1	LGA; 8	WGL	ELK	IMS	PET					19th	629	
2024	Tower Motorsports	LMP2	Oreca 07	Gibson GK428 4.2 L V8	DAY; 5	SEB; 12	WGL; 6	MOS; 6	ELK; 6	IMS; 8	ATL; 5					9th	1833	
2025	Tower Motorsports	LMP2	Oreca 07	Gibson GK428 4.2 L V8	DAY; 12	SEB; 2	WGL; 9	MOS; 9	ELK; 7	IMS; 7	ATL; 12					13th	1757	
2026	Tower Motorsports	LMP2	Oreca 07	Gibson GK428 4.2 L V8	DAY; 8	SEB; 3	WGL; 7	MOS; 8	ELK; 5	IMS; 4	PET; 4					6th	1967	

^{†} Points only counted towards the Michelin Endurance Cup, and not the overall LMP2 Championship.

=== 24 Hours of Le Mans results ===
Year	Team	Co-Drivers	Car	Class	Laps	Pos.	Class Pos.
2019	(United Kingdom) RLR MSport/Tower Events	(India) Arjun Maini (France) Norman Nato	Oreca 07-Gibson	LMP2	295	NC	NC
2026	(Luxembourg) DKR Engineering	(Mexico) Sebastián Álvarez (Netherlands) Renger van der Zande	Oreca 07-Gibson	LMP2	344	31st	17th
2026	(Luxembourg) DKR Engineering	(Mexico) Sebastián Álvarez (Netherlands) Renger van der Zande	Oreca 07-Gibson	LMP2 Pro-Am	344	31st	9th
