= 2022 Lexus Grand Prix at Mid-Ohio =

Sports car race in Ohio

The layout of the Mid-Ohio Sports Car Course

The 2022 Lexus Grand Prix of Mid-Ohio was a sports car race held at Mid-Ohio Sports Car Course near Lexington, Ohio on May 15, 2022. It was the fifth round of the 2022 IMSA SportsCar Championship and the third round of the 2022 WeatherTech Sprint Cup. Wayne Taylor Racing's #10 car piloted by Ricky Taylor and Filipe Albuquerque collected their second victory of the season.

== Background ==
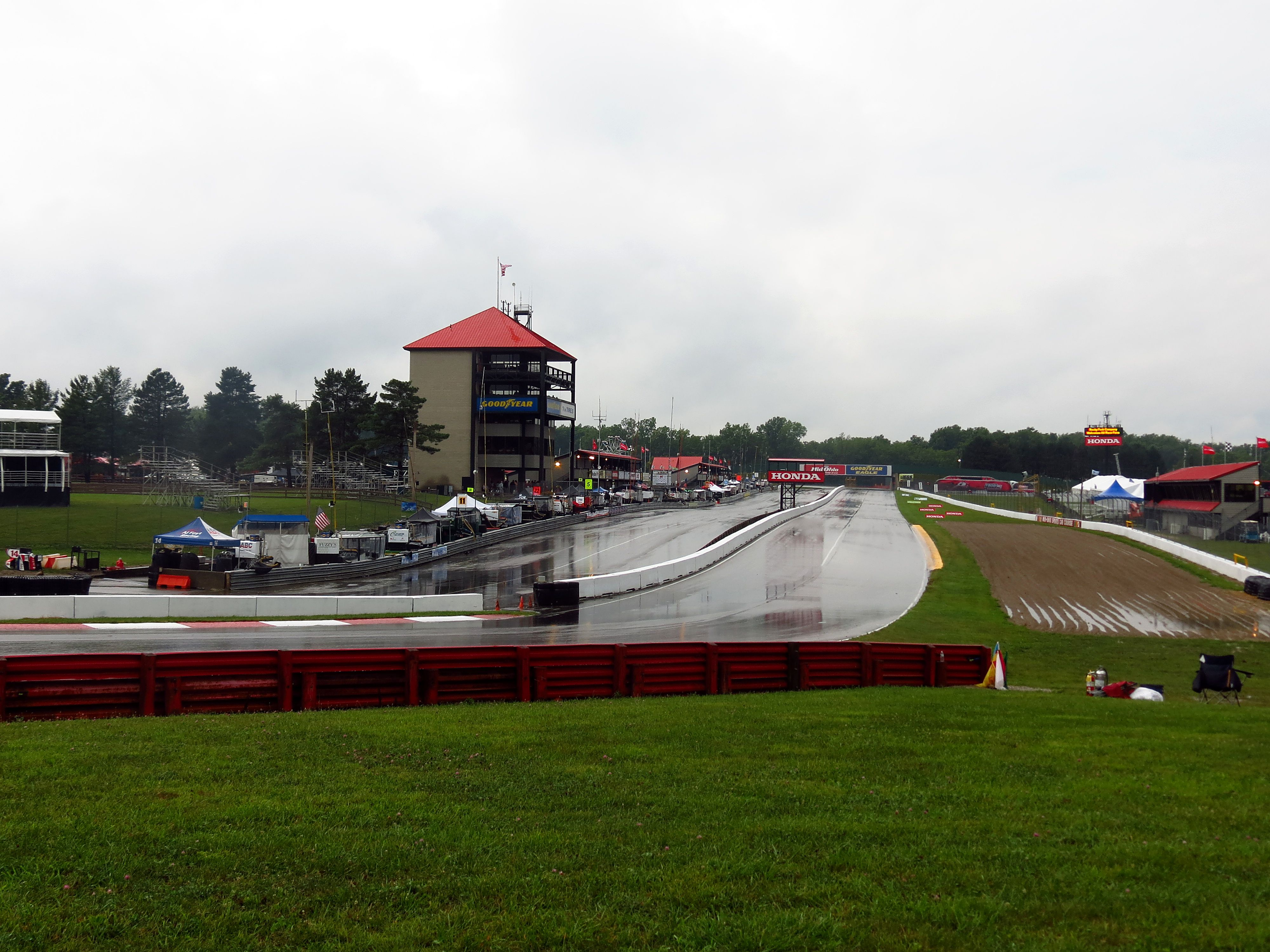
Mid-Ohio Sports Car Course, where the race was held.

International Motor Sports Association's (IMSA) president John Doonan confirmed the race was part of the schedule for the 2022 IMSA SportsCar Championship (IMSA SCC) in August 2021. It was the fifth consecutive year the event was held as part of the WeatherTech SportsCar Championship. The 2022 Lexus Grand Prix at Mid-Ohio was the fifth of twelve scheduled sports car races of 2022 by IMSA, and it was the third of eight rounds held as part of the WeatherTech Sprint Cup. The race was held at the thirteen-turn 2.258 mi (3.634 km) Mid-Ohio Sports Car Course near Lexington, Ohio on May 5, 2022.

On May 5, 2022, IMSA released the latest technical bulletin outlining Balance of Performance for the event. In DPi, the Cadillac DPi-V.R received a 10 kilogram weight break. In GTD, The Porsche 911 GT3 R received a 10 kilogram weight increase.

Before the race, Tom Blomqvist and Oliver Jarvis led the DPi Drivers' Championship, ahead of Filipe Albuquerque and Ricky Taylor on countback followed by Tristan Vautier and Richard Westbrook with 1308 points in third. In LMP2, Ryan Dalziel and Dwight Merriman led the Drivers' Championship by 33 points over John Farano and Louis Delétraz. With 374 points, João Barbosa, Lance Willsey, and Malthe Jakobsen led the LMP3 Drivers' Championship with a 31 point advantage over Ari Balogh, Dakota Dickerson, and Garett Grist. The GTD Drivers' Championship was led by Ryan Hardwick and Jan Heylen with 985 points followed by Stevan McAleer with 955 points. Acura and Porsche were leading their respective Manufactures' Championships while Meyer Shank Racing, PR1/Mathiasen Motorsports, Sean Creech Motorsport, and Wright Motorsports each led their own Teams' Championships.

=== Entries ===
A total of 31 cars took part in the event, split across four classes. 6 were entered in DPi, 6 in LMP2, 8 in LMP3, and 11 in GTD. In LMP2, Will Stevens subbed for Louis Deletraz in the Tower Motorsport entry due to a clash with the European Le Mans Series round at Imola. In LMP3, MLT Motorsports made its debut in the IMSA SportsCar Championship. In GTD, Team Hardpoint was absent while Vasser Sullivan Racing added a second entry featuring Jack Hawksworth and Richard Heistand. NTE Sport withdrew from the event due to a lack of funding. Jordan Pepper joined Brendan Iribe in the Inception Racing entry.

== Practice ==
There were two practice sessions preceding the start of the race on Sunday; one on Friday and one on Saturday. The first session on Friday afternoon ran for 90 minutes while the second session on Saturday morning lasted 105 minutes.

== Qualifying ==
Saturday's afternoon qualifying was broken into three sessions, with one session for the DPi and LMP2, LMP3, and GTD classes, which lasted for 15 minutes each, and a ten minute interval between the sessions. The rules dictated that all teams nominated a driver to qualify their cars, with the Pro-Am (LMP2/LMP3/GTD) classes requiring a Bronze/Silver Rated Driver to qualify the car. The competitors' fastest lap times determined the starting order. IMSA then arranged the grid to put DPis ahead of the LMP2, LMP3, and GTD cars.

=== Qualifying results ===
Pole positions in each class are indicated in bold and by ‡.

Pos.	Class	PIC	No.	Team	Driver	Time	Gap	Grid
1	**DPi**	**1**	**01**	**(United States) Cadillac Racing**	**(France) Sébastien Bourdais**	**1:10.439**	-	1‡
2	DPi	2	10	(United States) WTR - Konica Minolta Acura	(Portugal) Filipe Albuquerque	1:10.661	+0.222	2
3	DPi	3	60	(United States) Meyer Shank Racing with Curb-Agajanian	(United Kingdom) Oliver Jarvis	1:10.791	+0.352	3
4	DPi	4	02	(United States) Cadillac Racing	(United Kingdom) Alex Lynn	1:10.995	+0.556	4
5	DPi	5	31	(United States) Whelen Engineering Racing	(United States) Tristan Nunez	1:11.053	+0.614	5
6	DPi	6	5	(United States) JDC-Miller MotorSports	(France) Tristan Vautier	1:11.083	+0.644	6
7	**LMP2**	**1**	**52**	**(United States) PR1/Mathiasen Motorsports**	**(United States) Patrick Kelly**	**1:14.340**	**+3.901**	7‡
8	LMP2	2	11	(United States) PR1/Mathiasen Motorsports	(United States) Steven Thomas	1:15.276	+4.837	8
9	LMP2	3	81	(United States) DragonSpeed - 10 Star	(Sweden) Henrik Hedman	1:15.332	+4.893	9
10	LMP2	4	18	(United States) Era Motorsport	(United States) Dwight Merriman	1:16.077	+5.638	10
11	LMP2	5	8	(United States) Tower Motorsport	(Canada) John Farano	1:16.313	+5.874	11
12	LMP2	6	20	(Denmark) High Class Racing	(Denmark) Dennis Andersen	1:16.515	+6.076	12
13	**LMP3**	**1**	**36**	**(United States) Andretti Autosport**	**(United States) Jarett Andretti**	**1:17.104**	**+6.665**	13‡
14	LMP3	2	58	(United States) MLT Motorsports	(United States) Josh Sarchet	1:17.441	+7.002	14
15	LMP3	3	38	(United States) Performance Tech Motorsports	(United States) Dan Goldburg	1:17.788	+7.349	15
16	LMP3	4	74	(United States) Riley Motorsports	(United States) Gar Robinson	1:17.892	+7.453	16
17	LMP3	5	54	(United States) CORE Autosport	(United States) Jon Bennett	1:18.448	+8.009	17
18	LMP3	6	30	(United States) Jr III Motorsports	(United States) Ari Balogh	1:19.279	+8.840	18
19	LMP3	7	13	(Canada) AWA	(Canada) Orey Fidani	1:19.819	+9.380	19
20	LMP3	8	33	(United States) Sean Creech Motorsport	(United States) Lance Willsey	1:19.924	+9.485	20
21	**GTD**	**1**	**1**	**(United States) Paul Miller Racing**	**(United States) Madison Snow**	**1:20.525**	**+10.086**	21‡
22	GTD	2	32	(United States) Team Korthoff Motorsports	(United Kingdom) Stevan McAleer	1:20.725	+10.286	22
23	GTD	3	27	(United States) Heart of Racing Team	(Canada) Roman De Angelis	1:20.822	+10.383	23
24	GTD	4	96	(United States) Turner Motorsport	(United States) Robby Foley	1:21.012	+10.573	24
25	GTD	5	57	(United States) Winward Racing	(United States) Russell Ward	1:21.016	+10.577	25
26	GTD	6	12	(United States) Vasser Sullivan Racing	(United States) Frankie Montecalvo	1:21.120	+10.681	26
27	GTD	7	17	(United States) Vasser Sullivan Racing	(United States) Richard Heistand	1:21.410	+10.971	27
28	GTD	8	39	(United States) CarBahn with Peregrine Racing	(United States) Robert Megennis	1:21.450	+11.011	28
29	GTD	9	51	(Philippines) RWR Eurasia Motorsport	(Australia) Aidan Read	1:21.469	+11.030	29
30	GTD	10	70	(United Kingdom) Inception Racing with Optimum Motorsport	(United States) Brendan Iribe	1:22.044	+11.605	30
31	GTD	11	16	(United States) Wright Motorsports	(United States) Ryan Hardwick	1:22.652	+12.213	31

== Race ==
=== Post-Race ===
Albuquerque and Taylor took the lead of the DPi Drivers' Championship with 1707 points while Blomqvist and Jarvis dropped to second with 1675 points. Bamber and Lynn jumped from fourth to third. The result in LMP2 meant Montoya and Hedman took the lead of the LMP2 Drivers' Championship with 972 points while Bomarito and Thomas advanced from fourth to third. Grist and Balogh took the led of the LMP3 Drivers' Championship with 688 points while Braun and Bennett advanced from fifth to second with 661 points. The result in GTD meant McAleer retook the lead of the Drivers' Championship with 1237 points while Hardwick and Heylen dropped to second with 1225 points. Megennis and Westphal jumped from fifth to fourth while Montecalvo advanced from eighth to fifth. PR1/Mathiasen Motorsports continued to top the LMP2 Teams' Championship while Wayne Taylor Racing, Jr III Motorsports, and Gilbert Korthoff Motorsports became the leaders of their respective class Teams' Championships. Acura and Mercedes-AMG assumed the lead of their respective Manufacturers' Championships with seven rounds remaining.

=== Race results ===
Class winners are denoted in bold and ‡.

Pos	Class	PIC	No.	Team	Drivers	Chassis	Laps	Time/Retired
Pos	Class	PIC	No.	Team	Drivers	Engine	Laps	Time/Retired
1	**DPi**	**1**	**10**	**(United States) WTR - Konica Minolta Acura**	**(Portugal) Filipe Albuquerque (United States) Ricky Taylor**	**Acura ARX-05**	**121**	**2:40:20.108‡**
1	**DPi**	**1**	**10**	**(United States) WTR - Konica Minolta Acura**	**(Portugal) Filipe Albuquerque (United States) Ricky Taylor**	**Acura AR35TT 3.5 L Turbo V6**	**121**	**2:40:20.108‡**
2	DPi	2	60	(United States) Meyer Shank Racing with Curb-Agajanian	(United Kingdom) Oliver Jarvis (United Kingdom) Tom Blomqvist	Acura ARX-05	121	+2.098
2	DPi	2	60	(United States) Meyer Shank Racing with Curb-Agajanian	(United Kingdom) Oliver Jarvis (United Kingdom) Tom Blomqvist	Acura AR35TT 3.5 L Turbo V6	121	+2.098
3	DPi	3	31	(United States) Whelen Engineering Racing	(United States) Tristan Nunez (Brazil) Pipo Derani	Cadillac DPi-V.R	121	+16.910
3	DPi	3	31	(United States) Whelen Engineering Racing	(United States) Tristan Nunez (Brazil) Pipo Derani	Cadillac 5.5 L V8	121	+16.910
4	DPi	4	02	(United States) Cadillac Racing	(United Kingdom) Alex Lynn (New Zealand) Earl Bamber	Cadillac DPi-V.R	121	+36.916
4	DPi	4	02	(United States) Cadillac Racing	(United Kingdom) Alex Lynn (New Zealand) Earl Bamber	Cadillac 5.5 L V8	121	+36.916
5	DPi	5	01	(United States) Cadillac Racing	(France) Sebastien Bourdais (Netherlands) Renger van der Zande	Cadillac DPi-V.R	121	+37.104
5	DPi	5	01	(United States) Cadillac Racing	(France) Sebastien Bourdais (Netherlands) Renger van der Zande	Cadillac 5.5 L V8	121	+37.104
6	DPi	6	5	(United States) JDC-Miller MotorSports	(France) Tristan Vautier (United Kingdom) Richard Westbrook	Cadillac DPi-V.R	121	+1:02.301
6	DPi	6	5	(United States) JDC-Miller MotorSports	(France) Tristan Vautier (United Kingdom) Richard Westbrook	Cadillac 5.5 L V8	121	+1:02.301
7	**LMP2**	**1**	**81**	**(United States) DragonSpeed - 10 Star**	**(Sweden) Henrik Hedman (Colombia) Juan Pablo Montoya**	**Oreca 07**	**118**	**+3 Laps**
7	**LMP2**	**1**	**81**	**(United States) DragonSpeed - 10 Star**	**(Sweden) Henrik Hedman (Colombia) Juan Pablo Montoya**	**Gibson GK428 4.2 L V8**	**118**	**+3 Laps**
8	LMP2	2	11	(United States) PR1/Mathiasen Motorsports	(United States) Steven Thomas (United States) Jonathan Bomarito	Oreca 07	118	+3 Laps
8	LMP2	2	11	(United States) PR1/Mathiasen Motorsports	(United States) Steven Thomas (United States) Jonathan Bomarito	Gibson GK428 4.2 L V8	118	+3 Laps
9	LMP2	3	20	(Denmark) High Class Racing	(Denmark) Dennis Andersen (Denmark) Anders Fjordbach	Oreca 07	118	+3 Laps
9	LMP2	3	20	(Denmark) High Class Racing	(Denmark) Dennis Andersen (Denmark) Anders Fjordbach	Gibson GK428 4.2 L V8	118	+3 Laps
10	LMP2	4	8	(United States) Tower Motorsport	(Canada) John Farano (United Kingdom) Will Stevens	Oreca 07	117	+4 Laps
10	LMP2	4	8	(United States) Tower Motorsport	(Canada) John Farano (United Kingdom) Will Stevens	Gibson GK428 4.2 L V8	117	+4 Laps
11	LMP2	5	18	(United States) Era Motorsport	(United States) Dwight Merriman (United Kingdom) Ryan Dalziel	Oreca 07	117	+4 Laps
11	LMP2	5	18	(United States) Era Motorsport	(United States) Dwight Merriman (United Kingdom) Ryan Dalziel	Gibson GK428 4.2 L V8	117	+4 Laps
12	LMP2	6	52	(United States) PR1/Mathiasen Motorsports	(United States) Patrick Kelly (United States) Josh Pierson	Oreca 07	117	+4 Laps
12	LMP2	6	52	(United States) PR1/Mathiasen Motorsports	(United States) Patrick Kelly (United States) Josh Pierson	Gibson GK428 4.2 L V8	117	+4 Laps
13	**LMP3**	**1**	**54**	**(United States) CORE Autosport**	**(United States) Jon Bennett (United States) Colin Braun**	**Ligier JS P320**	**114**	**+7 Laps**
13	**LMP3**	**1**	**54**	**(United States) CORE Autosport**	**(United States) Jon Bennett (United States) Colin Braun**	**Nissan VK56DE 5.6 L V8**	**114**	**+7 Laps**
14	LMP3	2	30	(United States) Jr III Motorsports	(United States) Ari Balogh (Canada) Garett Grist	Ligier JS P320	113	+8 Laps
14	LMP3	2	30	(United States) Jr III Motorsports	(United States) Ari Balogh (Canada) Garett Grist	Nissan VK56DE 5.6 L V8	113	+8 Laps
15	LMP3	3	36	(United States) Andretti Autosport	(United States) Jarett Andretti (Colombia) Gabby Chaves	Ligier JS P320	113	+8 Laps
15	LMP3	3	36	(United States) Andretti Autosport	(United States) Jarett Andretti (Colombia) Gabby Chaves	Nissan VK56DE 5.6 L V8	113	+8 Laps
16	LMP3	4	74	(United States) Riley Motorsports	(United States) Gar Robinson (Brazil) Felipe Fraga	Ligier JS P320	113	+8 Laps
16	LMP3	4	74	(United States) Riley Motorsports	(United States) Gar Robinson (Brazil) Felipe Fraga	Nissan VK56DE 5.6 L V8	113	+8 Laps
17	LMP3	5	58	(United States) MLT Motorsports	(United States) Josh Sarchet (United States) Dakota Dickerson	Ligier JS P320	113	+8 Laps
17	LMP3	5	58	(United States) MLT Motorsports	(United States) Josh Sarchet (United States) Dakota Dickerson	Nissan VK56DE 5.6 L V8	113	+8 Laps
18	LMP3	6	33	(United States) Sean Creech Motorsport	(United States) Lance Willsey (Portugal) João Barbosa	Ligier JS P320	112	+9 Laps
18	LMP3	6	33	(United States) Sean Creech Motorsport	(United States) Lance Willsey (Portugal) João Barbosa	Nissan VK56DE 5.6 L V8	112	+9 Laps
19	**GTD**	**1**	**96**	**(United States) Turner Motorsport**	**(United States) Robby Foley (United States) Bill Auberlen**	**BMW M4 GT3**	**110**	**+11 Laps**
19	**GTD**	**1**	**96**	**(United States) Turner Motorsport**	**(United States) Robby Foley (United States) Bill Auberlen**	**BMW S58B30T0 3.0 L Twin Turbo I6**	**110**	**+11 Laps**
20	GTD	2	1	(United States) Paul Miller Racing	(United States) Madison Snow (United States) Bryan Sellers	BMW M4 GT3	110	+11 Laps
20	GTD	2	1	(United States) Paul Miller Racing	(United States) Madison Snow (United States) Bryan Sellers	BMW S58B30T0 3.0 L Twin Turbo I6	110	+11 Laps
21	GTD	3	12	(United States) Vasser Sullivan Racing	(United States) Frankie Montecalvo (United States) Aaron Telitz	Lexus RC F GT3	110	+11 Laps
21	GTD	3	12	(United States) Vasser Sullivan Racing	(United States) Frankie Montecalvo (United States) Aaron Telitz	Toyota 2UR 5.0 L V8	110	+11 Laps
22	GTD	4	39	(United States) CarBahn With Peregrine Racing	(United States) Robert Megennis (United States) Jeff Westphal	Lamborghini Huracán GT3 Evo	110	+11 Laps
22	GTD	4	39	(United States) CarBahn With Peregrine Racing	(United States) Robert Megennis (United States) Jeff Westphal	Lamborghini 5.2 L V10	110	+11 Laps
23	GTD	5	57	(United States) Winward Racing	(United States) Russell Ward (United Kingdom) Philip Ellis	Mercedes-AMG GT3 Evo	110	+11 laps
23	GTD	5	57	(United States) Winward Racing	(United States) Russell Ward (United Kingdom) Philip Ellis	Mercedes-AMG M159 6.2 L V8	110	+11 laps
24	GTD	6	32	(United States) Team Korthoff Motorsports	(United Kingdom) Stevan McAleer (United States) Mike Skeen	Mercedes-AMG GT3 Evo	110	+11 laps
24	GTD	6	32	(United States) Team Korthoff Motorsports	(United Kingdom) Stevan McAleer (United States) Mike Skeen	Mercedes-AMG M159 6.2 L V8	110	+11 laps
25	GTD	7	17	(United States) Vasser Sullivan Racing	(United States) Richard Heistand (United Kingdom) Jack Hawksworth	Lexus RC F GT3	110	+11 Laps
25	GTD	7	17	(United States) Vasser Sullivan Racing	(United States) Richard Heistand (United Kingdom) Jack Hawksworth	Toyota 2UR 5.0 L V8	110	+11 Laps
26	GTD	8	27	(United States) Heart of Racing Team	(United Kingdom) Roman De Angelis (Belgium) Maxime Martin	Aston Martin Vantage AMR GT3	110	+11 Laps
26	GTD	8	27	(United States) Heart of Racing Team	(United Kingdom) Roman De Angelis (Belgium) Maxime Martin	Aston Martin 4.0 L Turbo V8	110	+11 Laps
27	GTD	9	16	(United States) Wright Motorsports	(United States) Ryan Hardwick (Belgium) Jan Heylen	Porsche 911 GT3 R	110	+11 Laps
27	GTD	9	16	(United States) Wright Motorsports	(United States) Ryan Hardwick (Belgium) Jan Heylen	Porsche 4.0 L Flat-6	110	+11 Laps
28	GTD	10	51	(Philippines) RWR with Eurasia Motorsport	(Australia) Aidan Read (United States) Ryan Eversley	Acura NSX GT3 Evo22	109	+12 Laps
28	GTD	10	51	(Philippines) RWR with Eurasia Motorsport	(Australia) Aidan Read (United States) Ryan Eversley	Acura 3.5 L Turbo V6	109	+12 Laps
29	GTD	11	70	(United Kingdom) Inception Racing with Optimum Motorsport	(United States) Brendan Iribe (South Africa) Jordan Pepper	McLaren 720S GT3	110	+11 laps **(Post race penalty)**
29	GTD	11	70	(United Kingdom) Inception Racing with Optimum Motorsport	(United States) Brendan Iribe (South Africa) Jordan Pepper	McLaren M840T 4.0L Turbo V8	110	+11 laps **(Post race penalty)**
30	LMP3	7	38	(United States) Performance Tech Motorsports	(United States) Dan Goldburg (Sweden) Rasmus Lindh	Ligier JS P320	106	+15 Laps
30	LMP3	7	38	(United States) Performance Tech Motorsports	(United States) Dan Goldburg (Sweden) Rasmus Lindh	Nissan VK56DE 5.6 L V8	106	+15 Laps
31	LMP3	8	13	(Canada) AWA	(Canada) Orey Fidani (Canada) Kuno Wittmer	Ligier JS P320	100	+21 Laps
31	LMP3	8	13	(Canada) AWA	(Canada) Orey Fidani (Canada) Kuno Wittmer	Nissan VK56DE 5.6 L V8	100	+21 Laps

== Standings after the race ==
DPi Drivers' Championship standings
Pos.	+/–	Driver	Points
1	1	(Portugal) Filipe Albuquerque (United States) Ricky Taylor	1707
2	1	(United Kingdom) Tom Blomqvist (United Kingdom) Oliver Jarvis	1675
3	1	(United Kingdom) Alex Lynn (New Zealand) Earl Bamber	1603
4	1	(France) Tristan Vautier (United Kingdom) Richard Westbrook	1583
5		(Brazil) Pipo Derani (United States) Tristan Nunez	1575

LMP2 Drivers' Championship standings
Pos.	+/–	Driver	Points
1	4	(Colombia) Juan Pablo Montoya (Sweden) Henrik Hedman	972
2	1	(United Kingdom) Ryan Dalziel (United States) Dwight Merriman	963
3	1	(United States) Steven Thomas (United States) Jonathan Bomarito	950
4	2	(Canada) John Farano	948
5	2	(United States) Josh Pierson	900

LMP3 Drivers' Championship standings
Pos.	+/–	Driver	Points
1	1	(Canada) Garett Grist (United States) Ari Balogh	688
2	3	(United States) Jon Bennett (United States) Colin Braun	661
3	2	(Portugal) João Barbosa (United States) Lance Willsey	647
4	2	(United States) Dakota Dickerson	635
5	2	(United States) Daniel Goldburg (Sweden) Rasmus Lindh	596

GTD Pro Drivers' Championship standings
Pos.	+/–	Driver	Points
1		(Australia) Matt Campbell (France) Mathieu Jaminet	1345
2		(Spain) Antonio García (United States) Jordan Taylor	1295
3		(United Kingdom) Ben Barnicoat (United Kingdom) Jack Hawksworth	1265
4		(United States) Cooper MacNeil	1112
5		(United Kingdom) Ross Gunn (Spain) Alex Riberas	1106

GTD Drivers' Championship standings
Pos.	+/–	Driver	Points
1	1	(United Kingdom) Stevan McAleer	1237
2	1	(United States) Ryan Hardwick (Belgium) Jan Heylen	1225
3		(United States) Bill Auberlen (United States) Robby Foley	1161
4	1	(United States) Robert Megennis (United States) Jeff Westphal	1012
5	3	(United States) Frankie Montecalvo	1006

- Note: Only the top five positions are included for all sets of standings.

DPi Teams' Championship standings
Pos.	+/–	Team	Points
1	2	(United States) #10 WTR - Konica Minolta Acura	1707
2	1	(United States) #60 Meyer Shank Racing w/ Curb-Agajanian	1675
3	1	(United States) #02 Cadillac Racing	1603
4	1	(United States) #5 JDC-Miller MotorSports	1583
5		(United States) #31 Whelen Engineering Racing	1575

LMP2 Teams' Championship standings
Pos.	+/–	Team	Points
1		(United States) #52 PR1/Mathiasen Motorsports	982
2	3	(United States) #81 DragonSpeed USA	972
3	1	(United States) #18 Era Motorsport	963
4		(United States) #11 PR1/Mathiasen Motorsports	950
5	2	(United States) #8 Tower Motorsport	948

LMP3 Teams' Championship standings
Pos.	+/–	Team	Points
1	1	(United States) #30 Jr III Motorsports	688
2	3	(United States) #54 CORE Autosport	661
3	2	(United States) #33 Sean Creech Motorsport	647
4	1	(United States) #38 Performance Tech Motorsports	596
5	2	(United States) #74 Riley Motorsports	583

GTD Pro Teams' Championship standings
Pos.	+/–	Team	Points
1		(Canada) #9 Pfaff Motorsports	1345
2		(United States) #3 Corvette Racing	1295
3		(United States) #14 Vasser Sullivan Racing	1265
4		(United States) #79 WeatherTech Racing	1112
5		(United States) #23 Heart of Racing Team	1106

GTD Teams' Championship standings
Pos.	+/–	Team	Points
1	1	(United States) #32 Gilbert Korthoff Motorsports	1237
2	1	(United States) #16 Wright Motorsports	1225
3		(United States) #96 Turner Motorsport	1161
4	1	(United States) #39 CarBahn with Peregrine Racing	1012
5	3	(United States) #12 Vasser Sullivan Racing	1006

- Note: Only the top five positions are included for all sets of standings.

DPi Manufacturers' Championship standings
Pos.	+/–	Manufacturer	Points
1	1	(Japan) Acura	1856
2	1	(United States) Cadillac	1829

GTD Pro Manufacturers' Championship standings
Pos.	+/–	Manufacturer	Points
1		(Germany) Porsche	1345
2		(United States) Chevrolet	1305
3		(Japan) Lexus	1295
4		(Germany) Mercedes-AMG	1220
5		(Germany) BMW	1180

GTD Manufacturers' Championship standings
Pos.	+/–	Manufacturer	Points
1	2	(Germany) Mercedes-AMG	1310
2	1	(Germany) Porsche	1297
3	1	(Germany) BMW	1289
4	1	(United Kingdom) Aston Martin	1206
5		(Italy) Lamborghini	1199

- Note: Only the top five positions are included for all sets of standings.

IMSA SportsCar Championship
Previous race: 2022 Hyundai Monterey SportsCar Championship	2022 season	Next race: 2022 Chevrolet Detroit Grand Prix
