= 2021 WeatherTech 240 at The Glen =

Sixth round of the 2021 IMSA SportsCar Championship Season

Track map of Watkins Glen International

The 2021 WeatherTech 240 at The Glen was a sports car race sanctioned by the International Motor Sports Association (IMSA). The race was held at Watkins Glen International in Watkins Glen, New York on July 2, 2021. This race was the sixth round of the 2021 IMSA SportsCar Championship, and the third round of the 2021 WeatherTech Sprint Cup.

The race featured a 46-minute weather-enforced red flag period, and was won by the Whelen Engineering Racing duo of Pipo Derani and Felipe Nasr.

== Background ==
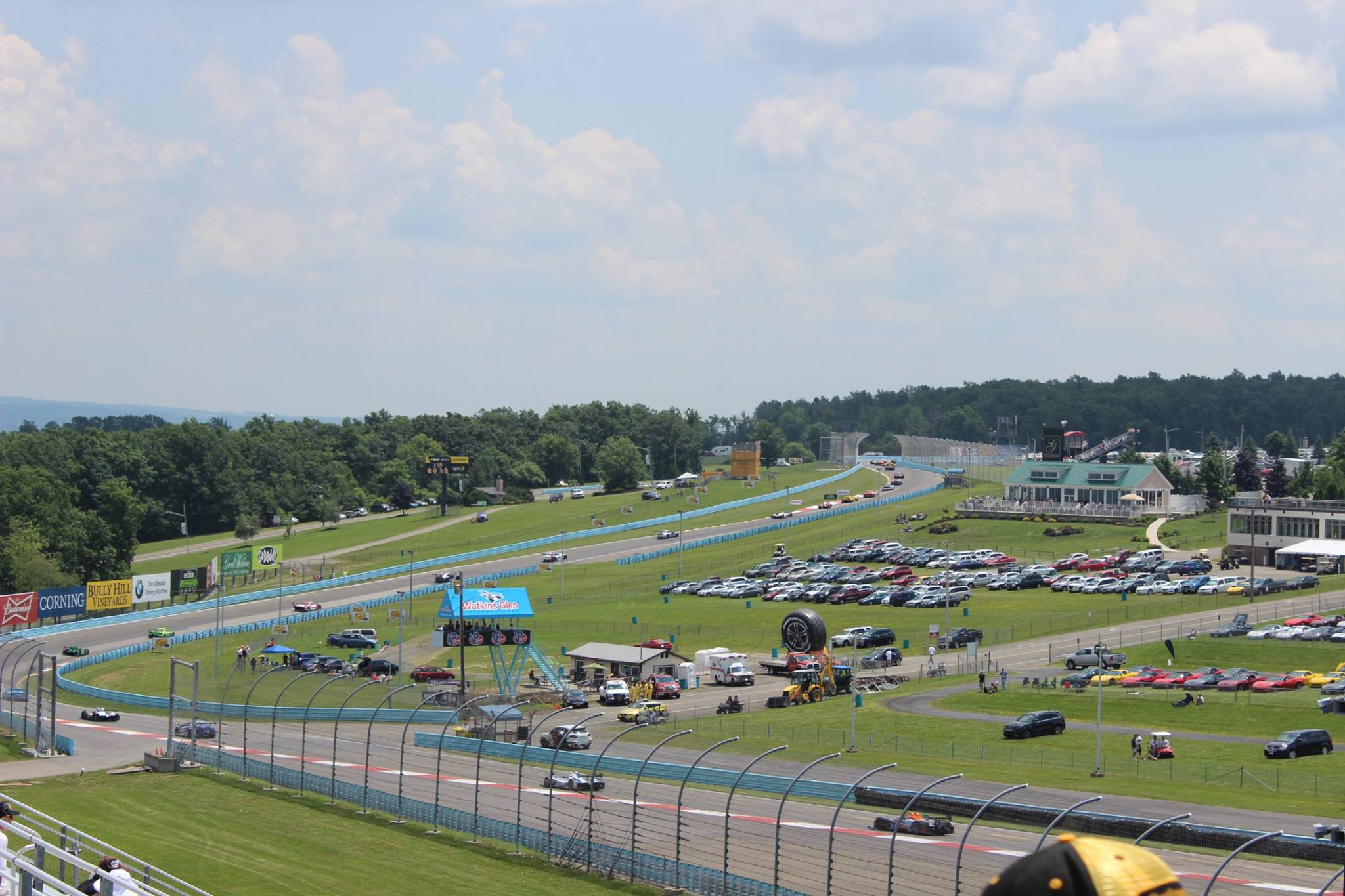
Watkins Glen International, where the race was held.

The race was a late addition to the 2021 IMSA SportsCar Championship calendar, after travel restrictions related to the COVID-19 pandemic forced the cancellation of the round at Canadian Tire Motorsport Park for the second consecutive year. With the round scheduled for the July 4th weekend, the WeatherTech 240 was run less than a week after the 2021 6 Hours of The Glen, creating a veritable double header at Watkins Glen.

On June 30, 2021, IMSA released the latest technical bulletin outlining Balance of Performance for the event. The lone change occurred in DPi, where the Cadillac DPi-V.R received a one-liter fuel capacity increase after finishing fourth through seventh in class the previous weekend.

Before the race, Filipe Albuquerque and Ricky Taylor led the DPi Drivers' Championship with 1733 points, ahead of Oliver Jarvis and Harry Tincknell in second with 1701 points, and Pipo Derani and Felipe Nasr with 1576 points. In LMP2, Scott Huffaker, Mikkel Jensen, and Ben Keating led the Drivers' Championship with 702 points, ahead of Thomas Merrill, Tristan Nunez, and Steven Thomas. With 1090 points, Gar Robinson led the LMP3 Drivers' Championship, 50 points ahead of Jon Bennett and Colin Braun. Nicky Catsburg, Antonio García, and Jordan Taylor led the GTLM Drivers' Championship with 1082 points, 81 points ahead of John Edwards, Augusto Farfus, and Jesse Krohn followed by Connor De Phillippi, Philipp Eng, and Bruno Spengler in third. With 1296 points, the GTD Drivers' Championship was led by Bill Auberlen and Robby Foley, ahead of Roman De Angelis and Ross Gunn. Cadillac, Chevrolet, and BMW were leading their respective Manufacturers' Championships, while WTR-Konica Minolta Acura, PR1/Mathiasen Motorsports, Riley Motorsports, Corvette Racing, and Turner Motorsport each led their own Teams' Championships.

=== Entries ===
A total of 30 cars took part in the event, split across five classes. 6 cars were entered in DPi, 3 in LMP2, 6 in LMP3, 3 in GTLM, and 12 in GTD. The pre-event entry list featured 31 cars, but was reduced to the final tally of 30 following the #16 Wright Motorsports entry's withdrawal.

The only change from the previous round in DPi was the absence of Ally Cadillac Racing, while LMP2 saw a reduced three full-season entries after Era Motorsport announced their intention to scale back their 2021 program. The Michelin Endurance Cup entry from United Autosports was also absent, as was their entry in LMP3. BMW Team RLL's absence saw the return of the three-car GTLM field, while GTD featured a host of changes owing to the round only paying points towards the WeatherTech Sprint Cup. Pfaff Motorsports and Magnus Racing withdrew, as they had done at Detroit, while Gradient Racing and Compass Racing replaced them as part of their Sprint Cup-only campaigns. Gilbert Korthoff Motorsports also made their IMSA SportsCar Championship debut at this event, bringing the GTD class tally to 13.

== Practice ==
There was one practice session preceding the start of the race on Friday, taking place on Thursday afternoon.

=== Practice 1 ===
The first and only practice session took place at 9:20 am ET on Thursday and ended with Olivier Pla topping the charts for Meyer Shank Racing with Curb-Agajanian, with a lap time of 1:48.813, ahead of the No. 01 Cadillac of Renger van der Zande. Gabriel Aubry set the fastest time in LMP2. Oliver Askew was fastest in LMP3 with a time of 1:59.440. The GTLM class was topped by the No. 4 Corvette Racing Chevrolet Corvette C8.R of Nick Tandy with a time of 1:59.440, ahead of teammate Jordan Taylor in the No. 3 Corvette. Robby Foley was fastest in GTD. The session was red flagged three times for on-track incidents. Kevin Magnussen crashed the No. 01 Cadillac at turn five and sustained rear end damage. Oliver Jarvis's Mazda came to a stop on an out lap causing the session to be stopped. The final stoppage came when Jarett Andretti spun the No. 36 Andretti Autosport Ligier.

Pos.	Class	No.	Team	Driver	Time	Gap
1	DPi	60	Meyer Shank Racing with Curb-Agajanian	Olivier Pla	1:48.813	_
2	DPi	01	Cadillac Chip Ganassi Racing	Renger van der Zande	1:48.953	+0.140
3	DPi	10	WTR-Konica Minolta Acura	Ricky Taylor	1:49.305	+0.492

== Qualifying ==
Qualifying was broken into four sessions. The first was for cars in GTD class. Madison Snow qualified on pole driving the No. 1 car for Paul Miller Racing, beating Frankie Montecalvo in the No. 12 Vasser Sullivan Racing by less than five tenths of a second. Richard Heistand was third in the No. 39 Audi followed by the No. 66 Acura of Till Bechtolsheimer, and Jeff Kingsley rounded out the top 5.

The second session was for cars in the GTLM and GTD classes. Jordan Taylor qualified on pole in GTLM driving the No. 3 car for Corvette Racing, besting teammate Nick Tandy in the sister No. 4 Corvette Racing entry. Jack Hawksworth set the fastest time in the GTD points paying session and earned 35 championship points.

The third session was for cars in the LMP3 class. Mateo Llarena qualified on pole for the class driving the No. 38 car for Performance Tech Motorsports. Llarena was more than seven-tenths clear of Jon Bennett in the No. 54 CORE Autosport entry followed by Jarett Andretti in the No. 36 Andretti Autosport car in third.

The final session of qualifying was for cars in the DPi and LMP2 classes. Ricky Taylor took overall pole for the event driving the No. 10 car for WTR-Konica Minolta Acura, besting Oliver Pla in the No. 60 Meyer Shank Racing w/ Curb-Agajanian. Following in third was the No. 01 Cadillac of Kevin Magnussen, with the No. 31 Cadillac of Pipo Derani in fourth. The Mazda Motorsports entry and JDC-Mustang Sampling Racing entries rounded out the DPi field. Ben Keating qualified on pole in LMP2 driving the PR1/Mathiasen Motorsports Oreca. Keating was 0.423 seconds clear of Steven Thomas in the WIN Autosport entry followed by John Farano in the No. 8 Tower Motorsport By Starworks car.

=== Qualifying results ===
Pole positions in each class are indicated in bold and by ‡.

Pos.	Class	No.	Team	Driver	Time	Gap	Grid
1	**DPi**	**10**	**(United States) WTR-Konica Minolta Acura**	**(United States) Ricky Taylor**	**1:30.058**	**_**	1‡
2	DPi	60	(United States) Meyer Shank Racing w/ Curb-Agajanian	(France) Olivier Pla	1:30.404	+0.346	2
3	DPi	01	(United States) Cadillac Chip Ganassi Racing	(Denmark) Kevin Magnussen	1:30.545	+0.487	3
4	DPi	31	(United States) Whelen Engineering Racing	(Brazil) Pipo Derani	1:30.684	+0.626	4
5	DPi	55	(Canada) Mazda Motorsports	(United Kingdom) Harry Tincknell	1:30.947	+0.889	5
6	DPi	5	(United States) JDC-Mustang Sampling Racing	(France) Loïc Duval	1:31.094	+1.036	6
7	**LMP2**	**52**	**(United States) PR1/Mathiasen Motorsports**	**(United States) Ben Keating**	**1:34.969**	**+4.911**	7‡
8	LMP2	11	(United States) WIN Autosport	(United States) Steven Thomas	1:35.392	+5.334	8
9	LMP2	8	(United States) Tower Motorsport By Starworks	(Canada) John Farano	1:39.644	+9.586	9
10	**LMP3**	**38**	**(United States) Performance Tech Motorsports**	**(Guatemala) Mateo Llarena**	**1:42.633**	**+12.575**	10‡
11	LMP3	54	(United States) CORE Autosport	(United States) Jon Bennett	1:43.368	+13.310	11
12	LMP3	36	(United States) Andretti Autosport	(United States) Jarett Andretti	1:43.608	+13.550	12
13	**GTLM**	**3**	**(United States) Corvette Racing**	**(United States) Jordan Taylor**	**1:43.821**	**+13.763**	16‡
14	GTLM	4	(United States) Corvette Racing	(United Kingdom) Nick Tandy	1:44.045	+13.987	17
15	LMP3	74	(United States) Riley Motorsports	(United States) Gar Robinson	1:44.650	+14.592	13
16	LMP3	84	(United Kingdom) D3+ Transformers-Dawson Racing	(Norway) Theodor Olsen	1:49.677	+19.619	15^{1}
17	LMP3	91	(United States) Riley Motorsports	(United States) Jim Cox	1:50.230	+20.172	14^{2}
18	GTLM	79	(United States) WeatherTech Racing	(United States) Cooper MacNeil	1:57.420	+27.362	18
19	**GTD**	**1**	**(United States) Paul Miller Racing**	**(United States) Madison Snow**	**1:59.380**	**+29.322**	19‡
20	GTD	12	(United States) Vasser Sullivan Racing	(United States) Frankie Montecalvo	1:59.820	+29.762	20
21	GTD	39	(United States) CarBahn Motorsports with Peregrine Racing	(United States) Richard Heistand	2:00.946	+30.888	21
22	GTD	66	(United States) Gradient Racing	(United Kingdom) Till Bechtolsheimer	2:01.146	+31.088	22
23	GTD	76	(United States) Compass Racing	(Canada) Jeff Kingsley	2:01.146	+31.088	23
24	GTD	23	(United States) Heart Of Racing Team	(Canada) Roman De Angelis	2:01.198	+31.140	24
25	GTD	28	(United States) Alegra Motorsports	(United States) Michael de Quesada	2:01.201	+31.143	25
26	GTD	14	(United States) Vasser Sullivan Racing	(United States) Aaron Telitz	2:01.396	+31.338	26
27	GTD	96	(United States) Turner Motorsport	(United States) Robby Foley	2:01.894	+31.836	27
28	GTD	88	(United States) Team Hardpoint EBM	(United States) Rob Ferriol	2:02.907	+32.849	28
29	GTD	32	(United States) Gilbert Korthoff Motorsports	(United States) Shane Lewis	2:04.610	+34.552	29
—	GTD	19	(Austria) GRT Grasser Racing Team	Time Disallowed			—
Sources:

- ^{1} The No. 84 D3+ Transformers-Dawson Racing entry was moved to the back of the LMP3 field as per Articles 40.1.4 and 40.5 of the Sporting regulations (Change of starting tires) and (Engine change).
- ^{2} The No. 91 Riley Motorsports entry was moved to the back of the LMP3 field as per Article 40.1.4 of the Sporting regulations (Change of starting tires).

== Race ==
=== Post-race ===
The result kept Filipe Albuquerque and Ricky Taylor atop the DPi Drivers' Championship with 2068 points. Magnussen and van der Zande advanced from fifth to fourth while Cameron and Pla dropped from fourth to fifth. With a total of 1087 points, Jensen and Keating's victory allowed them to increase their advantage over Nunez and Thomas in the LMP2 Drivers' Championship to 35 points. With a total of 1468 points, Robinson's victory allowed him to increase his advantage over Bennett and Braun in the LMP3 Drivers' Championship to 96 points. By finishing second place Milner and Tandy advanced from fourth to second in the GTLM Drivers' Championship. MacNeil jumped from fifth to third while the absent Edwards, Farfus, and Krohn dropped from second to fourth. GTD drivers, teams, and manufactures did not score full season points due to the event only counting towards the WeatherTech Sprint Cup. Cadillac and Chevrolet continued to top their respective Manufacturers' Championships while WTR-Konica Minolta Acura, PR1/Mathiasen Motorsports, Riley Motorsports, and Corvette Racing kept their respective advantages in their respective Teams' Championships with six rounds remaining in the season.

=== Race results ===
Class winners are denoted in bold and ‡.

Pos	Class	No.	Team	Drivers	Chassis	Laps	Time/Retired
Pos	Class	No.	Team	Drivers	Engine	Laps	Time/Retired
1	**DPi**	**31**	**(United States) Whelen Engineering Racing**	**(Brazil) Felipe Nasr (Brazil) Pipo Derani**	**Cadillac DPi-V.R**	**63**	**2:41:27.882‡**
1	**DPi**	**31**	**(United States) Whelen Engineering Racing**	**(Brazil) Felipe Nasr (Brazil) Pipo Derani**	**Cadillac 5.5L V8**	**63**	**2:41:27.882‡**
2	DPi	01	(United States) Cadillac Chip Ganassi Racing	(Netherlands) Renger van der Zande (Denmark) Kevin Magnussen	Cadillac DPi-V.R	63	+1.473
2	DPi	01	(United States) Cadillac Chip Ganassi Racing	(Netherlands) Renger van der Zande (Denmark) Kevin Magnussen	Cadillac 5.5L V8	63	+1.473
3	DPi	10	(United States) Konica Minolta Acura	(United States) Ricky Taylor (Portugal) Filipe Albuquerque	Acura ARX-05	63	+10.315
3	DPi	10	(United States) Konica Minolta Acura	(United States) Ricky Taylor (Portugal) Filipe Albuquerque	Acura AR35TT 3.5L Turbo V6	63	+10.315
4	DPi	5	(United States) JDC-Mustang Sampling Racing	(France) Tristan Vautier (France) Loïc Duval	Cadillac DPi-V.R	63	+12.025
4	DPi	5	(United States) JDC-Mustang Sampling Racing	(France) Tristan Vautier (France) Loïc Duval	Cadillac 5.5L V8	63	+12.025
5	DPi	55	(Canada) Mazda Motorsports	(United Kingdom) Oliver Jarvis (United Kingdom) Harry Tincknell	Mazda RT24-P	63	+12.446
5	DPi	55	(Canada) Mazda Motorsports	(United Kingdom) Oliver Jarvis (United Kingdom) Harry Tincknell	Mazda MZ-2.0T 2.0L Turbo I4	63	+12.446
6	DPi	60	(United States) Meyer Shank Racing with Curb-Agajanian	(United States) Dane Cameron (France) Olivier Pla	Acura ARX-05	63	+15.107
6	DPi	60	(United States) Meyer Shank Racing with Curb-Agajanian	(United States) Dane Cameron (France) Olivier Pla	Acura AR35TT 3.5L Turbo V6	63	+15.107
7	**LMP2**	**52**	**(United States) PR1/Mathiasen Motorsports**	**(United States) Ben Keating (Denmark) Mikkel Jensen**	**Oreca 07**	**59**	**+4 Laps‡**
7	**LMP2**	**52**	**(United States) PR1/Mathiasen Motorsports**	**(United States) Ben Keating (Denmark) Mikkel Jensen**	**Gibson 4.2L GK428 V8**	**59**	**+4 Laps‡**
8	LMP2	11	(United States) WIN Autosport	(United States) Steven Thomas (United States) Tristan Nunez	Oreca 07	59	+4 Laps
8	LMP2	11	(United States) WIN Autosport	(United States) Steven Thomas (United States) Tristan Nunez	Gibson 4.2L GK428 V8	59	+4 Laps
9	LMP2	8	(United States) Tower Motorsport by Starworks	(Canada) John Farano (France) Gabriel Aubry	Oreca 07	59	+4 Laps
9	LMP2	8	(United States) Tower Motorsport by Starworks	(Canada) John Farano (France) Gabriel Aubry	Gibson GK428 4.2L V8	59	+4 Laps
10	**LMP3**	**74**	**(United States) Riley Motorsports**	**(United States) Gar Robinson (Brazil) Felipe Fraga**	**Ligier JS P320**	**59**	**+4 Laps‡**
10	**LMP3**	**74**	**(United States) Riley Motorsports**	**(United States) Gar Robinson (Brazil) Felipe Fraga**	**Nissan VK56DE 5.6L V8**	**59**	**+4 Laps‡**
11	LMP3	91	(United States) Riley Motorsports	(United States) Jim Cox (United States) Dylan Murry	Ligier JS P320	59	+4 Laps
11	LMP3	91	(United States) Riley Motorsports	(United States) Jim Cox (United States) Dylan Murry	Nissan VK56DE 5.6L V8	59	+4 Laps
12	LMP3	54	(United States) CORE Autosport	(United States) Jon Bennett (United States) Colin Braun	Ligier JS P320	59	+4 Laps
12	LMP3	54	(United States) CORE Autosport	(United States) Jon Bennett (United States) Colin Braun	Nissan VK56DE 5.6L V8	59	+4 Laps
13	LMP3	36	(United States) Andretti Autosport	(United States) Jarett Andretti (United States) Oliver Askew	Ligier JS P320	59	+4 Laps
13	LMP3	36	(United States) Andretti Autosport	(United States) Jarett Andretti (United States) Oliver Askew	Nissan VK56DE 5.6L V8	59	+4 Laps
14	**GTLM**	**3**	**(United States) Corvette Racing**	**(Spain) Antonio García (United States) Jordan Taylor**	**Chevrolet Corvette C8.R**	**59**	**+4 Laps‡**
14	**GTLM**	**3**	**(United States) Corvette Racing**	**(Spain) Antonio García (United States) Jordan Taylor**	**Chevrolet 5.5L V8**	**59**	**+4 Laps‡**
15	GTLM	4	(United States) Corvette Racing	(United States) Tommy Milner (United Kingdom) Nick Tandy	Chevrolet Corvette C8.R	59	+4 Laps
15	GTLM	4	(United States) Corvette Racing	(United States) Tommy Milner (United Kingdom) Nick Tandy	Chevrolet 5.5L V8	59	+4 Laps
16	GTLM	79	(United States) WeatherTech Racing	(United States) Cooper MacNeil (Australia) Matt Campbell	Porsche 911 RSR-19	58	+5 Laps
16	GTLM	79	(United States) WeatherTech Racing	(United States) Cooper MacNeil (Australia) Matt Campbell	Porsche 4.2L Flat-6	58	+5 Laps
17	LMP3	38	(United States) Performance Tech Motorsports	(Guatemala) Mateo Llarena (Sweden) Rasmus Lindh	Ligier JS P320	58	+5 Laps
17	LMP3	38	(United States) Performance Tech Motorsports	(Guatemala) Mateo Llarena (Sweden) Rasmus Lindh	Nissan VK56DE 5.6L V8	58	+5 Laps
18	**GTD**	**14**	**(United States) Vasser-Sullivan Racing**	**(United States) Aaron Telitz (United Kingdom) Jack Hawksworth**	**Lexus RC F GT3**	**57**	**+6 Laps‡**
18	**GTD**	**14**	**(United States) Vasser-Sullivan Racing**	**(United States) Aaron Telitz (United Kingdom) Jack Hawksworth**	**Lexus 5.0L V8**	**57**	**+6 Laps‡**
19	GTD	12	(United States) Vasser-Sullivan Racing	(United States) Frankie Montecalvo (United States) Zach Veach	Lexus RC F GT3	57	+6 Laps
19	GTD	12	(United States) Vasser-Sullivan Racing	(United States) Frankie Montecalvo (United States) Zach Veach	Lexus 5.0L V8	57	+6 Laps
20	GTD	23	(United States) Heart of Racing Team	(Canada) Roman De Angelis (United Kingdom) Ross Gunn	Aston Martin Vantage GT3	57	+6 Laps
20	GTD	23	(United States) Heart of Racing Team	(Canada) Roman De Angelis (United Kingdom) Ross Gunn	Mercedes-Benz M177 4.0 L Turbo V8	57	+6 Laps
21	GTD	39	(United States) CarBahn Motorsports with Peregrine Racing	(United States) Richard Heistand (United States) Jeff Westphal	Audi R8 LMS Evo	57	+6 Laps
21	GTD	39	(United States) CarBahn Motorsports with Peregrine Racing	(United States) Richard Heistand (United States) Jeff Westphal	Audi 5.2L V10	57	+6 Laps
22	GTD	28	(United States) Alegra Motorsports	(Canada) Daniel Morad (United States) Michael de Quesada	Mercedes-AMG GT3 Evo	57	+6 Laps
22	GTD	28	(United States) Alegra Motorsports	(Canada) Daniel Morad (United States) Michael de Quesada	Mercedes-AMG M159 6.2L V8	57	+6 Laps
23	GTD	66	(United States) Gradient Racing	(United Kingdom) Till Bechtolsheimer (United States) Marc Miller	Acura NSX GT3 Evo	57	+6 Laps
23	GTD	66	(United States) Gradient Racing	(United Kingdom) Till Bechtolsheimer (United States) Marc Miller	Acura 3.5L Turbo V6	57	+6 Laps
24	GTD	32	(United States) Gilbert Korthoff Motorsports	(United States) Guy Cosmo (United States) Shane Lewis	Mercedes-AMG GT3 Evo	57	+6 Laps
24	GTD	32	(United States) Gilbert Korthoff Motorsports	(United States) Guy Cosmo (United States) Shane Lewis	Mercedes-AMG M159 6.2L V8	57	+6 Laps
25	GTD	88	(United States) Team Hardpoint EBM	(United States) Rob Ferriol (United Kingdom) Katherine Legge	Porsche 911 GT3 R	57	+6 Laps
25	GTD	88	(United States) Team Hardpoint EBM	(United States) Rob Ferriol (United Kingdom) Katherine Legge	Porsche 4.0L Flat-6	57	+6 Laps
26	GTD	76	(United States) Compass Racing	(Canada) Jeff Kingsley (Germany) Mario Farnbacher	Acura NSX GT3 Evo	54	+9 Laps
26	GTD	76	(United States) Compass Racing	(Canada) Jeff Kingsley (Germany) Mario Farnbacher	Acura 3.5L Turbo V6	54	+9 Laps
27 DNF	GTD	1	(United States) Paul Miller Racing	(United States) Bryan Sellers (United States) Madison Snow	Lamborghini Huracán GT3 Evo	48	Fuel Pump
27 DNF	GTD	1	(United States) Paul Miller Racing	(United States) Bryan Sellers (United States) Madison Snow	Lamborghini 5.2L V10	48	Fuel Pump
28	GTD	19	(Austria) GRT Grasser Racing Team	(Canada) Misha Goikhberg (France) Franck Perera	Lamborghini Huracán GT3 Evo	48	+15 Laps
28	GTD	19	(Austria) GRT Grasser Racing Team	(Canada) Misha Goikhberg (France) Franck Perera	Lamborghini 5.2L V10	48	+15 Laps
29 DNF	GTD	96	(United States) Turner Motorsport	(United States) Bill Auberlen (United States) Robby Foley	BMW M6 GT3	31	Power Steering
29 DNF	GTD	96	(United States) Turner Motorsport	(United States) Bill Auberlen (United States) Robby Foley	BMW 4.4L Turbo V8	31	Power Steering
30 DNF	LMP3	84	(United Kingdom) D3+ Transformers-Dawson Racing	(Norway) Theodor Olsen (United States) Dominic Cicero	Ligier JS P320	31	Engine
30 DNF	LMP3	84	(United Kingdom) D3+ Transformers-Dawson Racing	(Norway) Theodor Olsen (United States) Dominic Cicero	Nissan VK56DE 5.6L V8	31	Engine

== Standings after the race ==
DPi Drivers' Championship standings
Pos.	+/–	Driver	Points
1		(Portugal) Filipe Albuquerque (United States) Ricky Taylor	2068
2		(United Kingdom) Oliver Jarvis (United Kingdom) Harry Tincknell	1987
3		(Brazil) Pipo Derani (Brazil) Felipe Nasr	1954
4	1	(Denmark) Kevin Magnussen (Netherlands) Renger van der Zande	1849
5	1	(United States) Dane Cameron (France) Olivier Pla	1793

LMP2 Drivers' Championship standings
Pos.	+/–	Driver	Points
1		(Denmark) Mikkel Jensen (United States) Ben Keating	1087
2		(United States) Tristan Nunez (United States) Steven Thomas	1052
3	1	(France) Gabriel Aubry (Canada) John Farano	964
4	3	(United States) Scott Huffaker	702
5	3	(United States) Thomas Merrill	700

LMP3 Drivers' Championship standings
Pos.	+/–	Driver	Points
1		(United States) Gar Robinson	1468
2		(United States) Jon Bennett (United States) Colin Braun	1372
3		(United States) Jim Cox (United States) Dylan Murry	1290
4		(United States) Oliver Askew	1214
5		(Sweden) Rasmus Lindh (United States) Dan Goldburg	1183

GTLM Drivers' Championship standings
Pos.	+/–	Driver	Points
1		(Spain) Antonio García (United States) Jordan Taylor	1082
2	2	(United States) Tommy Milner (United Kingdom) Nick Tandy	1001
3	2	(United States) Cooper MacNeil	966
4	2	(United States) John Edwards (Brazil) Augusto Farfus (Finland) Jesse Krohn	959
5	2	(Australia) Matt Campbell	942

GTD Drivers' Championship standings
Pos.	+/–	Driver	Points
1		(United States) Bill Auberlen (United States) Robby Foley	1296‡
2		(Canada) Roman De Angelis (United Kingdom) Ross Gunn	1235‡
3		(United States) Madison Snow (United States) Bryan Sellers	1192‡
4		(Canada) Zacharie Robichon (Belgium) Laurens Vanthoor	1137‡
5		(United States) Patrick Long	1134‡

- Note: Only the top five positions are included for all sets of standings.
- ‡: Points count towards WeatherTech Sprint Cup championship only.

DPi Teams' Championship standings
Pos.	+/–	Team	Points
1		(United States) #10 WTR-Konica Minolta Acura	2068
2		(Canada) #55 Mazda Motorsports	1987
3		(United States) #31 Whelen Engineering Racing	1954
4	1	(United States) #01 Cadillac Chip Ganassi Racing	1849
5	1	(United States) #60 Meyer Shank Racing w/ Curb-Agajanian	1793

LMP2 Teams' Championship standings
Pos.	+/–	Team	Points
1		(United States) #52 PR1 Mathiasen Motorsports	1087
2	2	(United States) #11 WIN Autosport	1052
3	1	(United States) #8 Tower Motorsport	964
4	1	(United States) #18 Era Motorsport	640
5		(United States) #22 United Autosports	614

LMP3 Teams' Championship standings
Pos.	+/–	Team	Points
1		(United States) #74 Riley Motorsports	1468
2		(United States) #54 CORE Autosport	1372
3		(United States) #91 Riley Motorsports	1290
4		(United States) #38 Performance Tech Motorsports	1183
5		(United States) #36 Andretti Autosport	902

GTLM Teams' Championship standings
Pos.	+/–	Team	Points
1		(United States) #3 Corvette Racing	1467
2	2	(United States) #4 Corvette Racing	1311
3	2	(United States) #79 WeatherTech Racing	1272
4	2	(United States) #24 BMW Team RLL	1001
5	2	(United States) #25 BMW Team RLL	966

GTD Teams' Championship standings
Pos.	+/–	Team	Points
1		(United States) #96 Turner Motorsport	1296‡
2		(United States) #23 Heart of Racing Team	1235‡
3		(United States) #1 Paul Miller Racing	1192‡
4		(Canada) #9 Pfaff Motorsports	1137‡
5		(United States) #16 Wright Motorsports	1134‡

- Note: Only the top five positions are included for all sets of standings.
- ‡: Points count towards WeatherTech Sprint Cup championship only.

DPi Manufacturers' Championship standings
Pos.	+/–	Manufacturer	Points
1		(United States) Cadillac	2189
2		(Japan) Acura	2154
3		(Japan) Mazda	2059

GTLM Manufacturers' Championship standings
Pos.	+/–	Manufacturer	Points
1		(United States) Chevrolet	1490
2	1	(Germany) Porsche	1374
3	1	(Germany) BMW	1022
4		(Italy) Ferrari	330

GTD Manufacturers' Championship standings
Pos.	+/–	Manufacturer	Points
1		(Germany) BMW	1341‡
2		(Italy) Lamborghini	1283‡
3		(United Kingdom) Aston Martin	1281‡
4		(Germany) Porsche	1271‡
5		(Japan) Lexus	1210‡

- Note: Only the top five positions are included for all sets of standings.
- ‡: Points count towards WeatherTech Sprint Cup championship only.

IMSA SportsCar Championship
Previous race: 2021 6 Hours of The Glen	2021 season	Next race: 2021 Northeast Grand Prix
