= 2021 IMSA Monterey Grand Prix =

Ninth round of the 2021 IMSA SportsCar Championship Season

Track map of WeatherTech Raceway Laguna Seca

The 2021 IMSA Monterey Grand Prix was a sports car race sanctioned by the International Motor Sports Association (IMSA). The race was held at WeatherTech Raceway Laguna in Monterey, California on September 12, 2021. The race was the ninth round of the 2021 IMSA SportsCar Championship and the sixth round of the WeatherTech Sprint Cup.

== Background ==
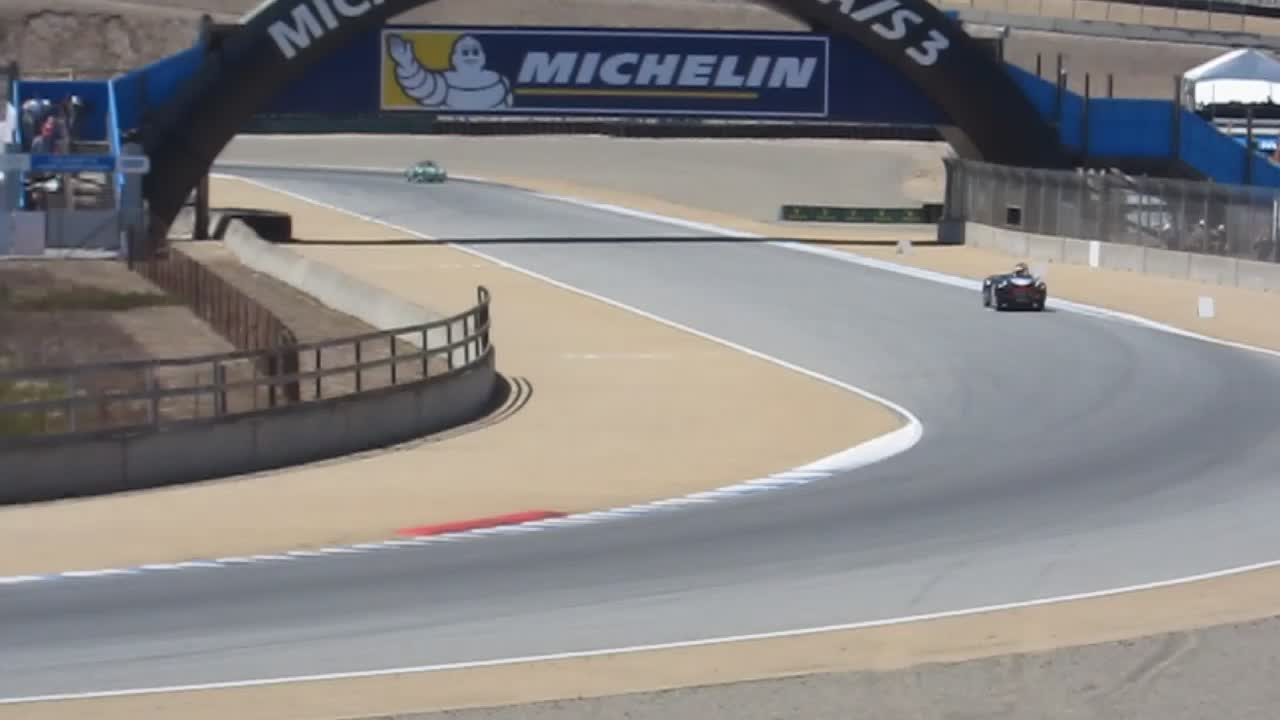
WeatherTech Raceway Laguna Seca, where the race was held.

Originally scheduled to run on April 25, 2021, the race was set to wrap up the two "West Coast Swing" rounds also consisting of Long Beach, however the event was postponed to September 12, 2021, due to the ongoing COVID-19 Pandemic in California.

On September 10, 2021, IMSA and WeatherTech Raceway Laguna Seca announced a three-year contract extension that would keep the WeatherTech SportsCar Championship on the calendar through to the end of 2024.

Before the race, Filipe Albuquerque and Ricky Taylor led the DPi Drivers' Championship with 2380 points, ahead of Pipo Derani and Felipe Nasr in second with 2339 points, and Oliver Jarvis and Harry Tincknell with 2337 points. In LMP2, Mikkel Jensen and Ben Keating led the Drivers' Championship with 1442 points, ahead of Tristan Nunez and Steven Thomas. Antonio García and Jordan Taylor led the GTLM Drivers' Championship with 2207 points, 214 points ahead of Tommy Milner and Nick Tandy followed by Cooper MacNeil in third. With 1930 points, the GTD Drivers' Championship was led by Bill Auberlen and Robby Foley, ahead of Roman De Angelis and Ross Gunn. Cadillac, Chevrolet, and Aston Martin were leading their respective Manufacturers' Championships, while WTR-Konica Minolta Acura, PR1/Mathiasen Motorsports, Corvette Racing, Turner Motorsport and each led their own Teams' Championships.

=== Entries ===
A total of 26 cars took part in the event, split across 4 classes. 6 cars were entered in DPi, 4 in LMP2, 3 in GTLM, and 13 in GTD. In GTD, NTE Sport didn't return after their outing at Road America. Heart of Racing added a second entry alongside its own full time entry. Grasser Racing Team was absent from the event due to a clash with the ADAC GT Masters round at Lausitzring. Jacob Abel subbed for Jeff Kingsley in the Compass Racing Acura.

== Practice ==
There were two practice sessions preceding the start of the race on Sunday, one on Friday and one on Saturday. The first session lasted one hour on Friday while the second session on Saturday lasted 75 minutes.

=== Practice 1 ===
The first practice session took place at 4:30 pm PT on Friday and ended with Filipe Albuquerque topping the charts for WTR-Konica Minolta Acura, with a lap time of 1:14.880, ahead of Pipo Derani in the No. 31 Cadillac. Mikkel Jensen set the fastest time in LMP2. The GTLM class was topped by the No. 4 Corvette Racing Chevrolet Corvette C8.R of Nick Tandy with a time of 1:22.081, ahead of Matt Campbell in the No. 79 Porsche. Bill Auberlen's No. 96 BMW was fastest in GTD, with a lap time of 1:24.630. Laurens Vanthoor in the No. 9 Porsche was second fastest followed by Bryan Sellers in the No. 1 Lamborghini.

Pos.	Class	No.	Team	Driver	Time	Gap
1	DPi	10	WTR-Konica Minolta Acura	Filipe Albuquerque	1:14.880	_
2	DPi	31	Whelen Engineering Racing	Pipo Derani	1:14.974	+0.094
3	DPi	55	Mazda Motorsports	Harry Tincknell	1:15.215	+0.335

=== Practice 2 ===
The second and final practice session took place at 8:45 am PT on Saturday and ended with Harry Tincknell topping the charts for Mazda Motorsports, with a lap time of 1:14.552. Pipo Derani's No. 31 Cadillac was second fastest followed by Filipe Albuquerque in the No. 10 Acura. Ryan Dalziel set the fastest time in LMP2. The GTLM class was topped by the No. 4 Corvette Racing Chevrolet Corvette C8.R of Tommy Milner with a time of 1:21.680, ahead of Jordan Taylor in the No. 3 Corvette. The GTD class was topped by the No. 1 Paul Miller Racing Lamborghini Huracán GT3 Evo of Madison Snow, with a lap time of 1:24.237. Trent Hindman was second fastest in the No. 16 Wright Motorsports Porsche followed by Zacharie Robichon in the No. 9 Pfaff Motorsports Porsche.

Pos.	Class	No.	Team	Driver	Time	Gap
1	DPi	55	Mazda Motorsports	Harry Tincknell	1:14.552	_
2	DPi	31	Whelen Engineering Racing	Pipo Derani	1:14.554	+0.002
3	DPi	10	WTR-Konica Minolta Acura	Filipe Albuquerque	1:14.680	+0.218

== Qualifying ==
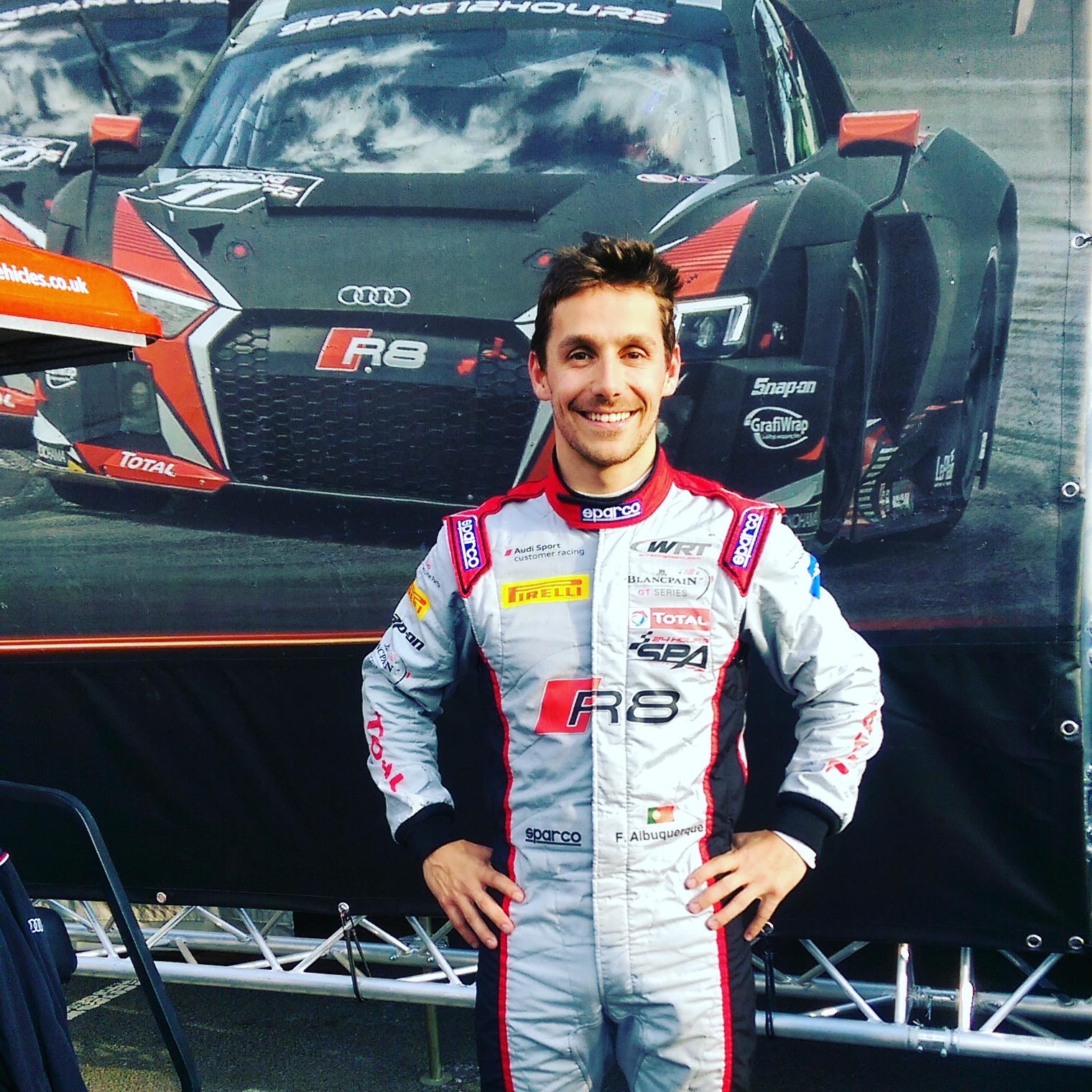
Filipe Albuquerque (pictured in 2016) helped take the No. 10 Acura's third pole position of 2021.

Qualifying was broken into three sessions. The first was for cars in GTD class. Trent Hindman qualified on pole for the class driving the No. 16 car for Wright Motorsports, beating Robby Foley in the No. 96 Turner Motorsport BMW by less than one-tenth of a second. Roman De Angelis in the No. 23 heart of Racing Team Aston Martin was third followed by The No. 1 Lamborghini of Madison Snow, and Richard Heistand's No. 39 Audi rounded out the top five.

The second session was for cars in the GTLM and GTD classes. Jordan Taylor qualified on pole in GTLM driving the No. 3 car for Corvette Racing, besting teammate Tommy Milner in the sister No. 4 Corvette Racing entry. Ross Gunn set the fastest time in the GTD points paying session driving the No. 23 car for Heart of Racing Team. However, the team were sent to the back of the GTD grid after Gunn exited the car before the session ended. As a result, Laurens Vanthoor was promoted to first and earned 35 championship points. Bill Auberlen was second in the No. 96 BMW followed by Bryan Sellers in the No. 1 Lamborghini.

The final session of qualifying was for cars in the DPi and LMP2 classes. Filipe Albuquerque took overall pole for the event driving the No. 10 car for WTR-Konica Minolta Acura, besting Dane Cameron in the No. 60 Meyer Shank Racing Acura by 0.023 seconds. Following in third was the No. 01 Cadillac of Kevin Magnussen, with the No. 55 Mazda of Harry Tincknell in fourth. Tincknell's No. 55 Mazda was demoted to the rear of the DPi field for the camber of the car exceeding the maximum permitted a post-qualifying technical inspection. Pipo Derani's No. 31 Whelen Engineering Racing Cadillac DPI-V.R started fourth with Tristan Vautier's No. 5 JDC-Mustang Sampling Racing Cadillac starting in fifth. Ben Keating qualified on pole in LMP2 driving the No. 52 car for PR1/Mathiasen Motorsports. Keating was more than two seconds clear of Dwight Merriman in the No. 18 Era Motorsport entry followed by Steven Thomas in the WIN Autosport car.

=== Qualifying results ===
Pole positions in each class are indicated in bold and by ‡.

Pos.	Class	No.	Team	Driver	Time	Gap	Grid
1	**DPi**	**10**	**(United States) WTR-Konica Minolta Acura**	**(Portugal) Filipe Albuquerque**	**1:14.441**	**_**	1‡
2	DPi	60	(United States) Meyer Shank Racing with Curb-Agajanian	(United States) Dane Cameron	1:14.464	+0.023	2
3	DPi	01	(United States) Cadillac Chip Ganassi Racing	(Denmark) Kevin Magnussen	1:15.026	+0.585	3
4	DPi	55	(Japan) Mazda Motorsports	(United Kingdom) Harry Tincknell	1:15.052	+0.611	6^{1}
5	DPi	31	(United States) Whelen Engineering Racing	(Brazil) Pipo Derani	1:15.384	+0.943	5
6	DPi	5	(United States) JDC-Mustang Sampling Racing	(France) Tristan Vautier	1:15.451	+1.010	6
7	**LMP2**	**52**	**(United States) PR1/Mathiasen Motorsports**	**(United States) Ben Keating**	**1:17.227**	**+2.786**	7‡
8	LMP2	18	(United States) Era Motorsport	(United States) Dwight Merriman	1:19.873	+5.432	8
9	LMP2	11	(United States) WIN Autosport	(United States) Steven Thomas	1:19.894	+5.453	9
10	**GTLM**	**3**	**(United States) Corvette Racing**	**(United States) Jordan Taylor**	**1:21.151**	**+6.710**	11‡
11	GTLM	4	(United States) Corvette Racing	(United States) Tommy Milner	1:21.267	+6.826	12
12	LMP2	8	(United States) Tower Motorsport By Starworks	(Canada) John Farano	1:21.563	+7.122	10^{2}
13	GTLM	79	(United States) WeatherTech Racing	(United States) Cooper MacNeil	1:21.931	+7.490	13
14	**GTD**	**16**	**(United States) Wright Motorsports**	**(United States) Trent Hindman**	**1:24.505**	**+10.064**	14‡
15	GTD	96	(United States) Turner Motorsport	(United States) Robby Foley	1:24.568	+10.127	15
16	GTD	23	(United States) Heart Of Racing Team	(Canada) Roman De Angelis	1:24.591	+10.150	26^{3}
17	GTD	1	(United States) Paul Miller Racing	(United States) Madison Snow	1:24.711	+10.270	16
18	GTD	39	(United States) CarBahn Motorsports with Peregrine Racing	(United States) Richard Heistand	1:24.751	+10.310	17
19	GTD	9	(Canada) Pfaff Motorsports	(Canada) Zacharie Robichon	1:24.754	+10.313	18
20	GTD	14	(United States) Vasser Sullivan Racing	(United States) Zach Veach	1:24.802	+10.361	19
21	GTD	27	(United States) Heart Of Racing Team	(United Kingdom) Ian James	1:25.385	+10.944	20
22	GTD	12	(United States) Vasser Sullivan Racing	(United States) Frankie Montecalvo	1:25.600	+11.159	21
23	GTD	88	(United States) Team Hardpoint EBM	(United States) Rob Ferriol	1:25.813	+11.372	22
24	GTD	76	(United States) Compass Racing	(United States) Jacob Abel	1:25.875	+11.434	23
25	GTD	44	(United States) Magnus Racing with Archangel Motorsports	(United States) John Potter	1:26.613	+12.172	25^{4}
26	GTD	66	(United States) Gradient Racing	Did Not Participate			24
Sources:

- ^{1} The No. 55 Mazda Motorsports entry was moved to the back of the DPi classification for violating competition rules regarding the car's camber.
- ^{2} The No. 8 Tower Motorsport By Starworks entry was moved to the back of the LMP2 classification as per Article 40.1.4 of the Sporting regulations (Change of starting tires).
- ^{3} The No. 23 Heart of Racing Team entry was moved to the back of the GTD classification as per Article 40.2.9. of the Sporting regulations (Gunn exited the car during the second GTD qualifying segment before the session ended).
- ^{4} The No. 44 Magnus Racing with Archangel Motorsports entry was moved to the back of the GTD classification as per Article 40.1.4 of the Sporting regulations (Change of starting tires).

== Race ==
=== Post-race ===
With a total of 2765 points, Filipe Albuquerque and Ricky Taylor's victory allowed them to increase their advantage over Derani and Nasr in the DPi Drivers' Championship to 98 points. With a total of 1807 points, Keating and Jensen's victory allowed them to increase over Nunez and Thomas in the LMP2 Drivers' Championship to 113 points. The result kept Antonio García and Jordan Taylor atop the GTLM Drivers' Championship. As a result of winning the race, Robichon and Vanthoor advanced from third to second in the GTD Drivers' Championship. Cadillac and Chevrolet continued to top their respective Manufacturers' Championships while Porsche took the lead of the GTD Manufactures' Championship. WTR-Konica Minolta Acura, PR1/Mathiasen Motorsports, Corvette Racing, and Turner Motorsport kept their respective advantages in their respective Teams' Championships with three rounds remaining in the season.

=== Race results ===
Class winners are denoted in bold and ‡.

Pos	Class	No.	Team	Drivers	Chassis	Laps	Time/Retired
Pos	Class	No.	Team	Drivers	Engine	Laps	Time/Retired
1	**DPi**	**10**	**(United States) Konica Minolta Acura**	**(Portugal) Filipe Albuquerque (United States) Ricky Taylor**	**Acura ARX-05**	**118**	**2:40:49.456‡**
1	**DPi**	**10**	**(United States) Konica Minolta Acura**	**(Portugal) Filipe Albuquerque (United States) Ricky Taylor**	**Acura AR35TT 3.5L Turbo V6**	**118**	**2:40:49.456‡**
2	DPi	01	(United States) Cadillac Chip Ganassi Racing	(Netherlands) Renger van der Zande (Denmark) Kevin Magnussen	Cadillac DPi-V.R	118	+14.875
2	DPi	01	(United States) Cadillac Chip Ganassi Racing	(Netherlands) Renger van der Zande (Denmark) Kevin Magnussen	Cadillac 5.5L V8	118	+14.875
3	DPi	31	(United States) Whelen Engineering Racing	(Brazil) Felipe Nasr (Brazil) Pipo Derani	Cadillac DPi-V.R	118	+15.392
3	DPi	31	(United States) Whelen Engineering Racing	(Brazil) Felipe Nasr (Brazil) Pipo Derani	Cadillac 5.5L V8	118	+15.392
4	DPi	60	(United States) Meyer Shank Racing with Curb-Agajanian	(United States) Dane Cameron (France) Olivier Pla	Acura ARX-05	118	+25.529
4	DPi	60	(United States) Meyer Shank Racing with Curb-Agajanian	(United States) Dane Cameron (France) Olivier Pla	Acura AR35TT 3.5L Turbo V6	118	+25.529
5	DPi	55	(Canada) Mazda Motorsports	(United Kingdom) Oliver Jarvis (United Kingdom) Harry Tincknell	Mazda RT24-P	118	+28.503
5	DPi	55	(Canada) Mazda Motorsports	(United Kingdom) Oliver Jarvis (United Kingdom) Harry Tincknell	Mazda MZ-2.0T 2.0L Turbo I4	118	+28.503
6	DPi	5	(United States) JDC-Mustang Sampling Racing	(France) Tristan Vautier (France) Loïc Duval	Cadillac DPi-V.R	116	+2 Laps
6	DPi	5	(United States) JDC-Mustang Sampling Racing	(France) Tristan Vautier (France) Loïc Duval	Cadillac 5.5L V8	116	+2 Laps
7	**LMP2**	**52**	**(United States) PR1/Mathiasen Motorsports**	**(Denmark) Mikkel Jensen (United States) Ben Keating**	**Oreca 07**	**116**	**+2 Laps‡**
7	**LMP2**	**52**	**(United States) PR1/Mathiasen Motorsports**	**(Denmark) Mikkel Jensen (United States) Ben Keating**	**Gibson Technology GK428 V8**	**116**	**+2 Laps‡**
8	LMP2	8	(United States) Tower Motorsport By Starworks	(France) Gabriel Aubry (Canada) John Farano	Oreca 07	115	+3 Laps
8	LMP2	8	(United States) Tower Motorsport By Starworks	(France) Gabriel Aubry (Canada) John Farano	Gibson Technology GK428 V8	115	+3 Laps
9	LMP2	11	(United States) WIN Autosport	(United States) Tristan Nunez (United States) Steven Thomas	Oreca 07	115	+3 Laps
9	LMP2	11	(United States) WIN Autosport	(United States) Tristan Nunez (United States) Steven Thomas	Gibson Technology GK428 V8	115	+3 Laps
10	LMP2	18	(United States) Era Motorsport	(United Kingdom) Ryan Dalziel (United States) Dwight Merriman	Oreca 07	115	+3 Laps
10	LMP2	18	(United States) Era Motorsport	(United Kingdom) Ryan Dalziel (United States) Dwight Merriman	Gibson Technology GK428 V8	115	+3 Laps
11	**GTLM**	**4**	**(United States) Corvette Racing**	**(United States) Tommy Milner (United Kingdom) Nick Tandy**	**Chevrolet Corvette C8.R**	**112**	**+6 Laps‡**
11	**GTLM**	**4**	**(United States) Corvette Racing**	**(United States) Tommy Milner (United Kingdom) Nick Tandy**	**Chevrolet 5.5L V8**	**112**	**+6 Laps‡**
12	GTLM	3	(United States) Corvette Racing	(Spain) Antonio García (United States) Jordan Taylor	Chevrolet Corvette C8.R	111	+7 Laps
12	GTLM	3	(United States) Corvette Racing	(Spain) Antonio García (United States) Jordan Taylor	Chevrolet 5.5L V8	111	+7 Laps
13	GTLM	79	(United States) WeatherTech Racing	(United States) Cooper MacNeil (Australia) Matt Campbell	Porsche 911 RSR-19	111	+7 Laps
13	GTLM	79	(United States) WeatherTech Racing	(United States) Cooper MacNeil (Australia) Matt Campbell	Porsche 4.2L Flat-6	111	+7 Laps
14	**GTD**	**9**	**(Canada) Pfaff Motorsports**	**(Canada) Zacharie Robichon (Belgium) Laurens Vanthoor**	**Porsche 911 GT3 R**	**107**	**+11 Laps‡**
14	**GTD**	**9**	**(Canada) Pfaff Motorsports**	**(Canada) Zacharie Robichon (Belgium) Laurens Vanthoor**	**Porsche 4.0L Flat-6**	**107**	**+11 Laps‡**
15	GTD	1	(United States) Paul Miller Racing	(United States) Bryan Sellers (United States) Madison Snow	Lamborghini Huracán GT3 Evo	107	+11 Laps
15	GTD	1	(United States) Paul Miller Racing	(United States) Bryan Sellers (United States) Madison Snow	Lamborghini 5.2L V10	107	+11 Laps
16	GTD	16	(United States) Wright Motorsports	(United States) Trent Hindman (United States) Patrick Long	Porsche 911 GT3 R	107	+11 Laps
16	GTD	16	(United States) Wright Motorsports	(United States) Trent Hindman (United States) Patrick Long	Porsche 4.0L Flat-6	107	+11 Laps
17	GTD	96	(United States) Turner Motorsport	(United States) Bill Auberlen (United States) Robby Foley	BMW M6 GT3	107	+11 Laps
17	GTD	96	(United States) Turner Motorsport	(United States) Bill Auberlen (United States) Robby Foley	BMW 4.4L Turbo V8	107	+11 Laps
18	GTD	23	(United States) Heart of Racing Team	(Canada) Roman De Angelis (United Kingdom) Ross Gunn	Aston Martin Vantage GT3	107	+11 Laps
18	GTD	23	(United States) Heart of Racing Team	(Canada) Roman De Angelis (United Kingdom) Ross Gunn	Mercedes-Benz M177 4.0 L Turbo V8	107	+11 Laps
19	GTD	14	(United States) Vasser-Sullivan Racing	(United Kingdom) Jack Hawksworth (United States) Aaron Telitz	Lexus RC F GT3	106	+12 Laps
19	GTD	14	(United States) Vasser-Sullivan Racing	(United Kingdom) Jack Hawksworth (United States) Aaron Telitz	Lexus 5.0L V8	106	+12 Laps
20	GTD	39	(United States) CarBahn Motorsports with Peregrine Racing	(United States) Richard Heistand (United States) Jeff Westphal	Audi R8 LMS Evo	106	+12 Laps
20	GTD	39	(United States) CarBahn Motorsports with Peregrine Racing	(United States) Richard Heistand (United States) Jeff Westphal	Audi 5.2L V10	106	+12 Laps
21	GTD	88	(United States) Team Hardpoint EBM	(United States) Rob Ferriol (United Kingdom) Katherine Legge	Porsche 911 GT3 R	106	+12 Laps
21	GTD	88	(United States) Team Hardpoint EBM	(United States) Rob Ferriol (United Kingdom) Katherine Legge	Porsche 4.0L Flat-6	106	+12 Laps
22	GTD	44	(United States) Magnus Racing with Archangel Motorsports	(United States) John Potter (United States) Andy Lally	Acura NSX GT3 Evo	106	+12 Laps
22	GTD	44	(United States) Magnus Racing with Archangel Motorsports	(United States) John Potter (United States) Andy Lally	Acura 3.5L Turbo V6	106	+12 Laps
23	GTD	12	(United States) Vasser-Sullivan Racing	(United States) Frankie Montecalvo (United States) Zach Veach	Lexus RC F GT3	105	+13 Laps
23	GTD	12	(United States) Vasser-Sullivan Racing	(United States) Frankie Montecalvo (United States) Zach Veach	Lexus 5.0L V8	105	+13 Laps
24	GTD	66	(United States) Gradient Racing	(United Kingdom) Till Bechtolsheimer (United States) Marc Miller	Acura NSX GT3 Evo	103	+15 Laps
24	GTD	66	(United States) Gradient Racing	(United Kingdom) Till Bechtolsheimer (United States) Marc Miller	Acura 3.5L Turbo V6	103	+15 Laps
25 DNF	GTD	27	(United States) Heart of Racing Team	(United Kingdom) Ian James (Spain) Alex Riberas	Aston Martin Vantage GT3	0	Collision
25 DNF	GTD	27	(United States) Heart of Racing Team	(United Kingdom) Ian James (Spain) Alex Riberas	Mercedes-Benz M177 4.0 L Turbo V8	0	Collision
26 DNF	GTD	76	(United States) Compass Racing	(United States) Jacob Abel (Germany) Mario Farnbacher	Acura NSX GT3 Evo	0	Collision
26 DNF	GTD	76	(United States) Compass Racing	(United States) Jacob Abel (Germany) Mario Farnbacher	Acura 3.5L Turbo V6	0	Collision

== Standings after the race ==
DPi Drivers' Championship standings
Pos.	+/–	Driver	Points
1		(Portugal) Filipe Albuquerque (United States) Ricky Taylor	2765
2		(Brazil) Pipo Derani (Brazil) Felipe Nasr	2667
3		(United Kingdom) Oliver Jarvis (United Kingdom) Harry Tincknell	2597
4		(Denmark) Kevin Magnussen (Netherlands) Renger van der Zande	2527
5		(United States) Dane Cameron (France) Olivier Pla	2390

LMP2 Drivers' Championship standings
Pos.	+/–	Driver	Points
1		(Denmark) Mikkel Jensen (United States) Ben Keating	1807
2		(United States) Tristan Nunez (United States) Steven Thomas	1694
3		(France) Gabriel Aubry (Canada) John Farano	1634
4		(United Kingdom) Ryan Dalziel (United States) Dwight Merriman	1330
5		(United States) Scott Huffaker	702

LMP3 Drivers' Championship standings
Pos.	+/–	Driver	Points
1		(United States) Gar Robinson	1800
2		(United States) Jon Bennett (United States) Colin Braun	1750
3		(United States) Jim Cox (United States) Dylan Murry	1594
4		(Sweden) Rasmus Lindh	1538
5		(United States) Oliver Askew	1504

GTLM Drivers' Championship standings
Pos.	+/–	Driver	Points
1		(Spain) Antonio García (United States) Jordan Taylor	2562
2		(United States) Tommy Milner (United Kingdom) Nick Tandy	2375
3		(United States) Cooper MacNeil	2314
4		(Australia) Matt Campbell	1702
5		(United States) John Edwards (Brazil) Augusto Farfus (Finland) Jesse Krohn	1001

GTD Drivers' Championship standings
Pos.	+/–	Driver	Points
1		(United States) Bill Auberlen (United States) Robby Foley	2242
2	1	(Canada) Zacharie Robichon (Belgium) Laurens Vanthoor	2215
3	1	(Canada) Roman De Angelis (United Kingdom) Ross Gunn	2190
4		(United States) Madison Snow (United States) Bryan Sellers	2156
5		(United States) Patrick Long	2038

- Note: Only the top five positions are included for all sets of standings.

DPi Teams' Championship standings
Pos.	+/–	Team	Points
1		(United States) #10 WTR-Konica Minolta Acura	2765
2		(United States) #31 Whelen Engineering Racing	2667
3		(Canada) #55 Mazda Motorsports	2597
4		(United States) #01 Cadillac Chip Ganassi Racing	2527
5		(United States) #60 Meyer Shank Racing w/ Curb-Agajanian	2390

LMP2 Teams' Championship standings
Pos.	+/–	Team	Points
1		(United States) #52 PR1 Mathiasen Motorsports	1807
2		(United States) #11 WIN Autosport	1694
3		(United States) #8 Tower Motorsport	1634
4		(United States) #18 Era Motorsport	1330
5		(United States) #22 United Autosports	614

LMP3 Teams' Championship standings
Pos.	+/–	Team	Points
1		(United States) #74 Riley Motorsports	1800
2		(United States) #54 CORE Autosport	1750
3		(United States) #91 Riley Motorsports	1594
4		(United States) #38 Performance Tech Motorsports	1538
5		(United States) #36 Andretti Autosport	1192

GTLM Teams' Championship standings
Pos.	+/–	Team	Points
1		(United States) #3 Corvette Racing	2562
2		(United States) #4 Corvette Racing	2375
3		(United States) #79 WeatherTech Racing	2314
4		(United States) #24 BMW Team RLL	1001
5		(United States) #25 BMW Team RLL	966

GTD Teams' Championship standings
Pos.	+/–	Team	Points
1		(United States) #96 Turner Motorsport	2242
2	1	(Canada) #9 Pfaff Motorsports	2215
3	1	(United States) #23 Heart of Racing Team	2190
4		(United States) #1 Paul Miller Racing	2156
5		(United States) #16 Wright Motorsports	2038

- Note: Only the top five positions are included for all sets of standings.

DPi Manufacturers' Championship standings
Pos.	+/–	Manufacturer	Points
1		(United States) Cadillac	2926
2		(Japan) Acura	2871
3		(Japan) Mazda	2709

GTLM Manufacturers' Championship standings
Pos.	+/–	Manufacturer	Points
1		(United States) Chevrolet	2615
2		(Germany) Porsche	2460
3		(Germany) BMW	1052
4		(Italy) Ferrari	330

GTD Manufacturers' Championship standings
Pos.	+/–	Manufacturer	Points
1	2	(Germany) Porsche	2349
2		(Germany) BMW	2311
3	2	(United Kingdom) Aston Martin	2288
4		(Italy) Lamborghini	2273
5		(Japan) Lexus	2173

- Note: Only the top five positions are included for all sets of standings.

IMSA SportsCar Championship
Previous race: 2021 Road Race Showcase at Road America	2021 season	Next race: 2021 Grand Prix of Long Beach
