= Starworks Motorsport =

American former auto racing team

(United States) Starworks Motorsport
- Founded: 2010
- Folded: 2021
- Team principal(s): Peter Baron
- Former series: GRAND-AM Rolex Series, FIA World Endurance Championship, Continental Tire Sports Car Challenge, IMSA SportsCar Championship
- Noted drivers: Renger van der Zande, Martin Fuentes, Alex Popow, Mirco Schultis, Sam Bird
- Teams' Championships: 2
- Drivers' Championships: 2

Starworks Motorsport was an American automobile racing team based in Ft. Lauderdale, Florida, last competing in the 2021 IMSA SportsCar Championship fielding the No. 8 Oreca 07 in LMP2. The team was established in 2010 by Peter Baron.

== History ==
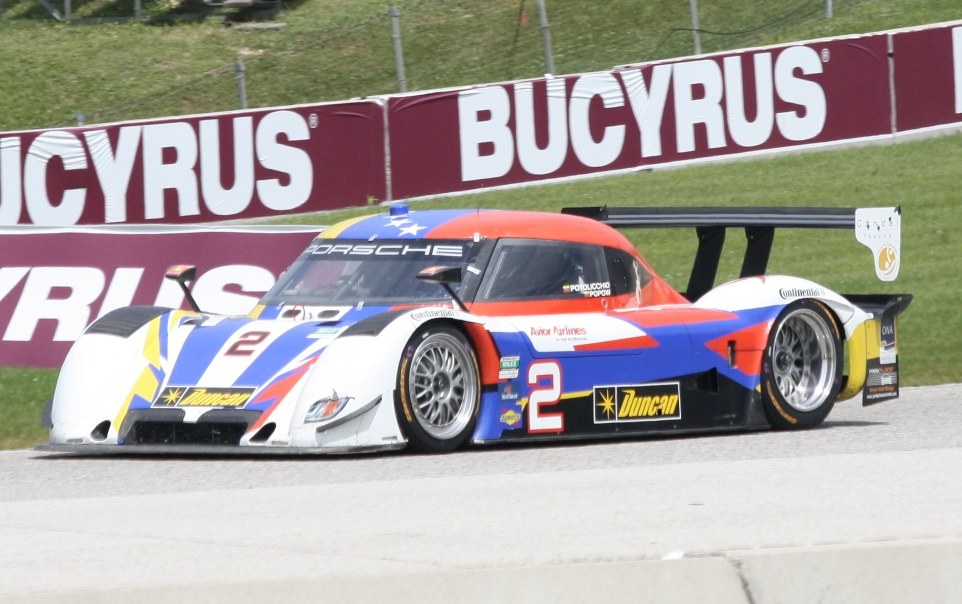
#2 2011 Daytona Prototype

Peter Baron is a successful entrepreneur, and former Le Mans 24 Hours class podium finisher, with 20 years of motorsports experience as a driver, manager and winning team owner. He has run successful motor racing teams since 2005 in the Indy Car Series, GRAND AM, and Indy Racing League Indy Car Series. He re-launched his team in January 2010 as Starworks Motorsport and competed in the entire Rolex Sports Car Series with one, and sometimes two, Riley-BMW Daytona Prototypes. In 2011, the Starworks switched to Ford power and fielded an additional Riley Daytona Prototype in select races, capped off by an end-of-season victory at Mid-Ohio Sports Car Course with drivers Ryan Dalziel and Enzo Potolicchio.

In 2012, Starworks kicked off the year with pole at the 2012 24 Hours of Daytona by Ryan Dalziel en route to a second-place finish in the race with drivers Ryan Dalziel, Allan McNish, Lucas Luhr, Enzo Potolicchio and Alex Popow. The team started from pole position, led the most laps and had the fastest race lap.

The team also debuted in the Continental Tire Sports Car Challenge with four Ford Mustang Boss 302R GTs.

On February 2, 2012, Starworks announced that it would compete in the FIA World Endurance Championship, becoming only the second American team to do so. At the 2012 12 Hours of Sebring, Dalziel, Potolicchio and Stéphane Sarrazin managed to finish 1st in LMP2 ahead of Level 5 Motorsports and 3rd overall. This was their 2nd overall podium of the year after Daytona. At the 2012 24 Hours of Le Mans Starworks finished 1st in LMP2 and 7th overall.

During the 2012 season, Starworks Motorsport recorded wins at the 12 Hours of Sebring, the 24 Hours of Le Mans, and the first Rolex Series race held at Indianapolis Motor Speedway. The team also finished second at the Rolex 24 at Daytona and third at the Sahlen's Six Hours of The Glen. That year, Starworks became the first LMP2 champion in the FIA World Endurance Championship and the first North American to win an FIA World Championship in 46 years. The team also won the 2012 GRAND-AM North American Endurance Championship and let the most laps in the Daytona Prototype class.

Peter Baron has since been honored by the Greater Pompano Beach Chamber of Commerce at a luncheon held at the Hillsboro Beach Club. He joined nine other area residents recognized for their accomplishments and achievements which have reflected positively on the community — a “Shining Light of the Community.” Peter also became the recipient of the 2012 Rolex Bob Snodgrass Award of Excellence. The announcement was made during the traditional prelude to the 2013 Rolex 24 at Daytona - the Grand Marshal Dinner — which was held at the Daytona 500 Club and attended by 300 guests on January 25, 2013. From a short-list of three highly successful team owners who competed in the 2012 Grand-Am Rolex Sports Car Series, a panel of motorsports professionals selected Baron as the award recipient.

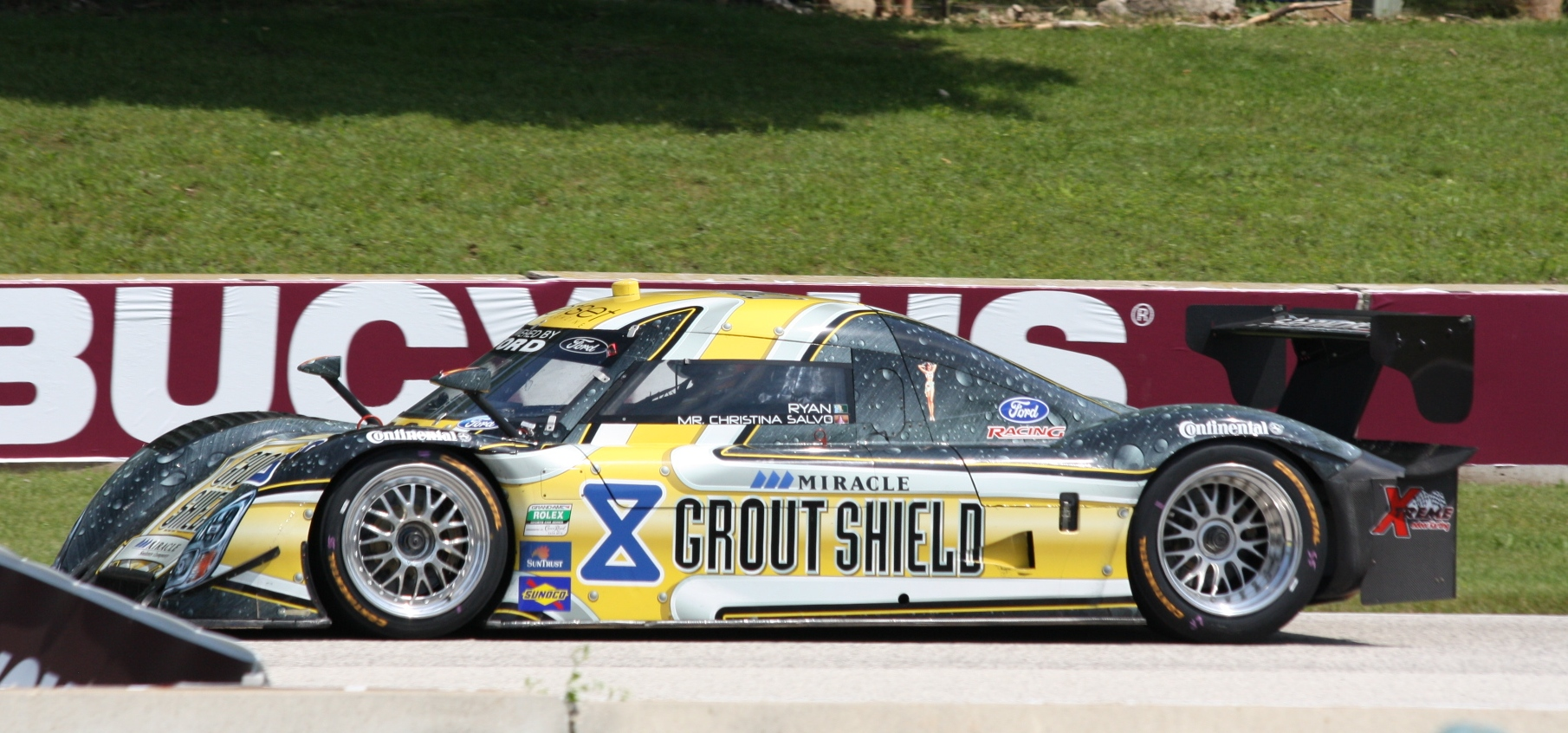
#8 2011 Daytona Prototype

Stewart Wicht, president of Rolex Watch U.S.A., presented Baron with an engraved Rolex Yacht-Master watch to commemorate the award. The Harris Snodgrass Award recognizes a Grand-Am team owner or manager who exemplifies integrity, passion for motorsports, and dedication to the sport.

In 2013 Alex Popow won the ‘Jim Trueman’ Award by a landslide and the team was crowned ‘Sports Car Team of the Year’ by the SPEED Channel.

Starworks Motorsport came fourth in the 2013 GRAND-AM Rolex Sports Car Series (DP Class) and also competed in two ALMS races (one as RSR Racing) in the LMPC category.

=== IMSA SportsCar Championship ===
==== 2020 ====
In 2020, Starworks entered a partnership with Canadian businessman and racecar driver John Farano to field an entry in the LMP2 class of the 2020 IMSA SportsCar Championship. The team's anchor driver was Farano who brought sponsorship with his own Tower Events company. Starworks was entered under the name Tower Motorsport by Starworks Motorsport due to the sponsorship from Farano. They would field the No. 8 Oreca 07 with Farano, Ryan Dalziel, David Heinemeier Hansson, and Nicolas Lapierre. The team would only compete in the Michelin Endurance Cup rounds of the championship. Mikkel Jensen would join the team for Petit Le Mans and the 12 Hours of Sebring, replacing Ryan Dalziel. Job van Uitert would join as the third driver for Petit Le Mans. They would win their first race of the season at the 2020 Petit Le Mans held at Road Atlanta.

==== 2021 ====
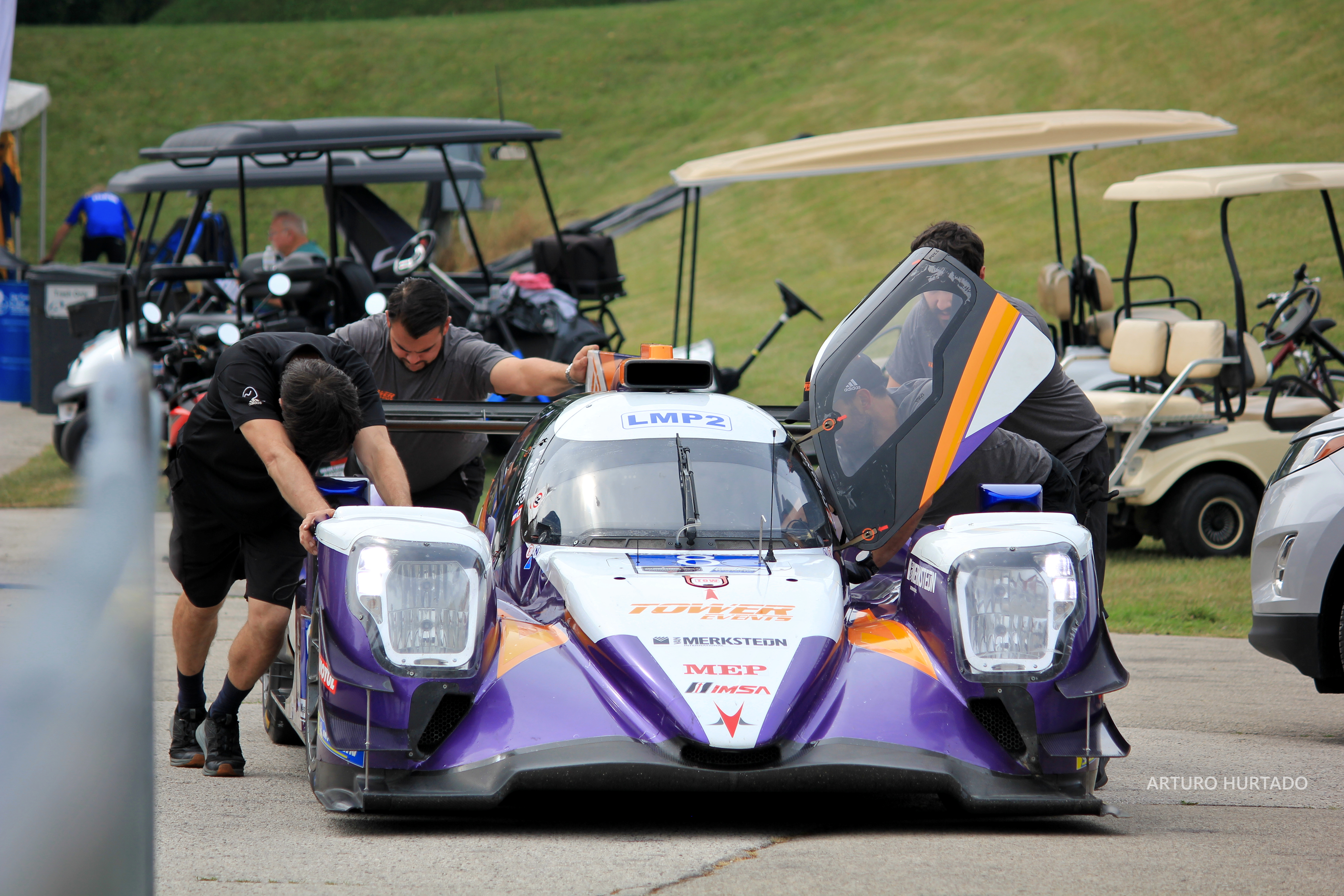
#8 2021 Oreca 07

The team would return for the 2021 IMSA SportsCar Championship once again fielding the No. 8 Oreca 07 in LMP2. The entry would once again compete as Tower Motorsport by Starworks Motorsport. They would do the full season with John Farano and Gabriel Aubry. Timothé Buret and Matthieu Vaxivière completed their Michelin Endurance Cup lineup. The team had a good debut to the season, as they finished second in the 2021 24 Hours of Daytona. However, their fortunes would quickly turn as they retired in the following two races at Sebring and Watkins Glen. Since there were only five cars in the LMP2 class at Sebring, the No. 8 was still credited with a third place finish as they still finished ahead of the WIN Autosport and United Autosports LMP2 cars. At Watkins Glen, an accident cut the No. 8's race short and they were credited with a fourth place finish. The No. 8's form quickly turned around as they got three podiums in a row at Watkins Glen, Road America, and Laguna Seca respectively. Going into the final race of the season at the 2021 Petit Le Mans, the No. 8 qualified fourth in its class. During the end of the race, the team was battling with the No. 52 PR1/Mathiasen Motorsports car for the win. The No. 52 would cross the finish line in first place ahead of the No. 8 in second. However, a post race drive-through equivalent time penalty was given to the No. 52 for contact in the closing minutes of the race. Thus, the No. 8 was given the LMP2 class win in the 2021 Petit Le Mans. The No. 8 would finish third in the LMP2 standings.

==== 2022 ====
For 2022, the No. 8 team's operations were taken over by Ricky Capone and his team Capone Motorsports. The No. 8 would compete as just Tower Motorsport in the 2022 IMSA SportsCar Championship.

== Past drivers ==
- Renger van der Zande
- Martin Fuentes
- Mirco Schultis
- Stéphane Sarrazin
- Tom Kimber-Smith
- Sébastien Bourdais
- Scott Mayer
- Allan McNish
- Ryan Dalziel
- Enzo Potolicchio
- Alex Popow
- Brendon Hartley
- Ryan Hunter-Reay
- Rubens Barrichello
- Marco Andretti

== Racing record ==
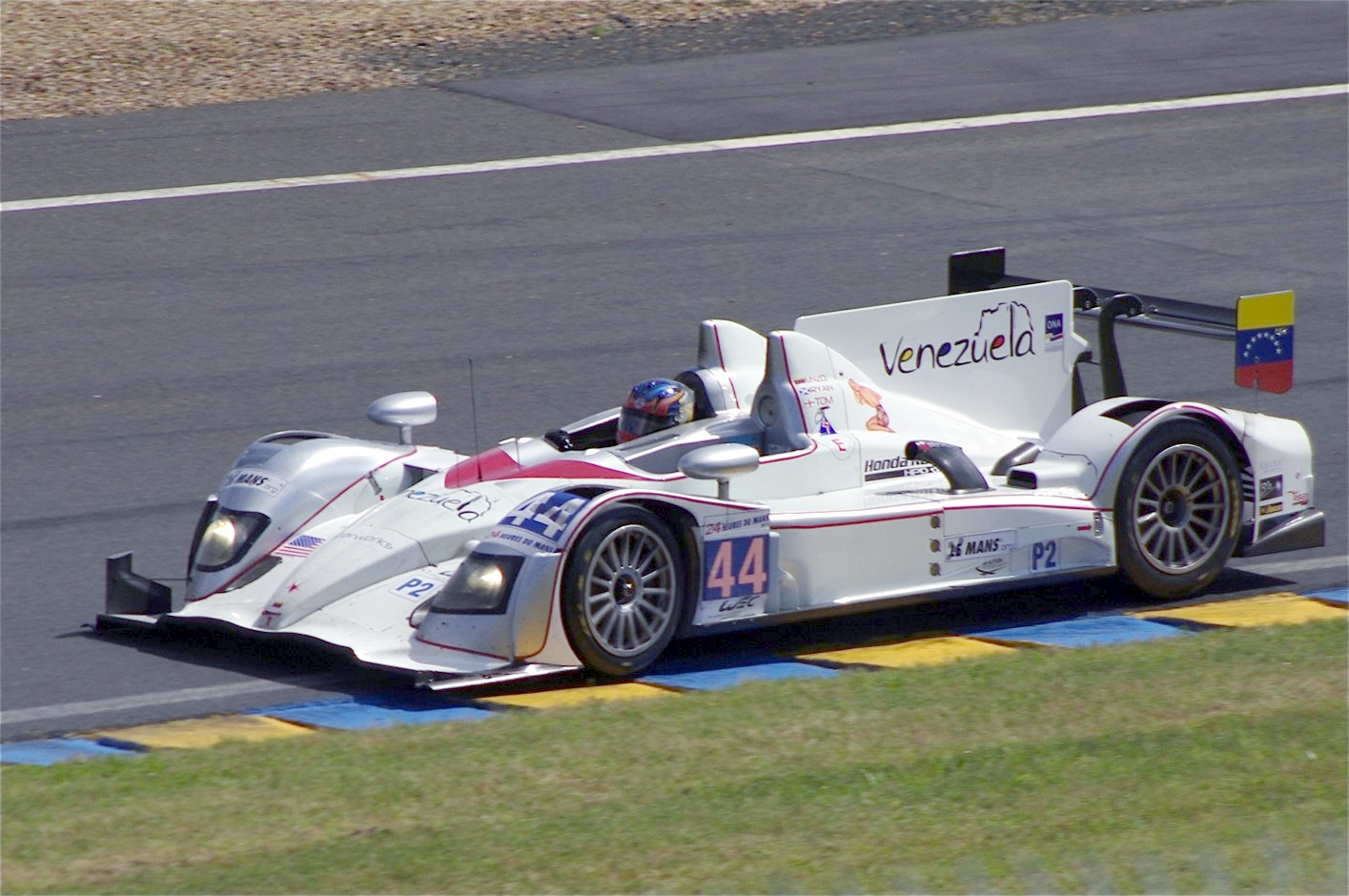
Starworks' 24 Hours of Le Mans-winning HPD ARX-03b.

=== 24 Hours of Le Mans results ===
Year	Entrant	No.	Car	Drivers	Class	Laps	Pos.	Class Pos.
2012	(United States) Starworks Motorsport	44	HPD ARX-03b	(United Kingdom) Ryan Dalziel (United Kingdom) Tom Kimber-Smith (Venezuela) Enzo Potolicchio	LMP2	354	7th	**1st**

=== Complete IMSA SportsCar Championship results ===
(key) (Races in bold indicate pole position; races in italics indicate fastest lap)

Year	Entrant	Class	No	Chassis	Engine	Drivers	1	2	3	4	5	6	7	Pos.	Pts
2020	(United States) Tower Motorsport by Starworks Motorsport	LMP2	8	Oreca 07	Gibson GK428 4.2 L V8	(Canada) John Farano (United Kingdom) Ryan Dalziel (Denmark) David Heinemeier Hansson (France) Nicolas Lapierre (Denmark) Mikkel Jensen (Netherlands) Job van Uitert	DAY; 4†	SEB; 4	ELK	ATL	PET; 1	LGA	SEB; 2	4th	95
2021	(United States) Tower Motorsport by Starworks Motorsport	LMP2	8	Oreca 07	Gibson GK428 4.2 L V8	(France) Gabriel Aubry (Canada) John Farano (France) Timothé Buret (France) Matthieu Vaxivière (United States) James French	DAY; 2†	SEB; 3	WGL; 4	WGL; 3	ELK; 2	LGA; 2	ATL; 1	3rd	2012
