= Eric Curran =

American racing driver (born 1975)

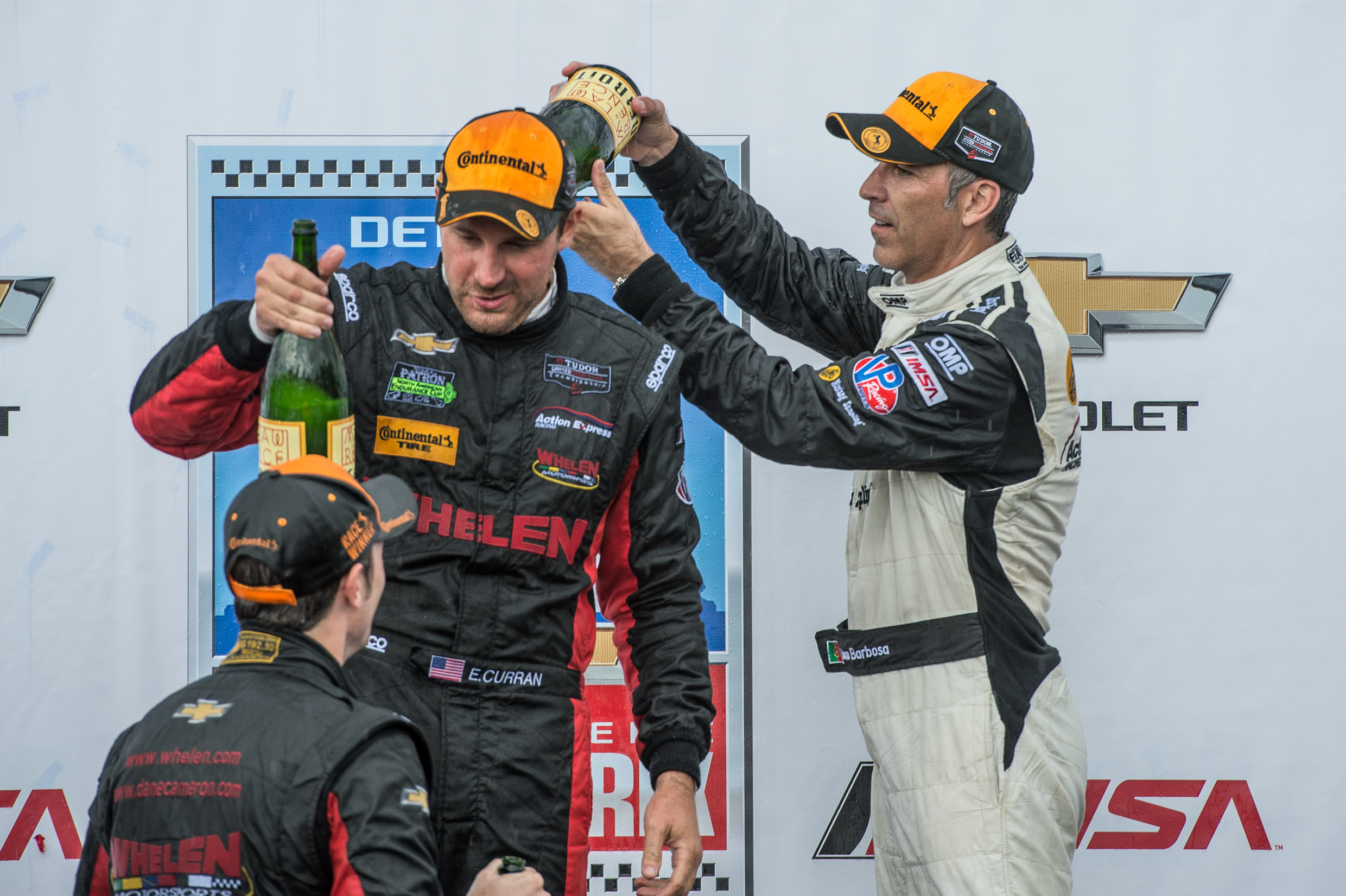
- Teammate João Barbosa pours champagne on Eric Curran in celebration of Eric's first win in the Tudor United SportsCar Championship.
- Nationality: American
- Born: 8 June 1975 (age 51) Sarasota, Florida, United States

United SportsCar Championship career
- Debut season: 2014
- Current team: Action Express Racing
- Categorisation: FIA Gold
- Car number: 31
- Engine: Cadillac 6.2 L V8
- Co-driver: Dane Cameron
- Championships: 1 (in 2016)
- Wins: 5
- Best finish: 1st (Chevrolet Sports Car Classic) in 2015

Previous series
- Rolex Sports Car Series; Pirelli World Challenge; Continental Tire Sports Car Challenge; NASCAR Nationwide Series; NASCAR K&N Pro Series East; NASCAR K&N Pro Series West

NASCAR O'Reilly Auto Parts Series career
- 2 races run over 1 year
- Best finish: 85th (2012)
- First race: 2012 Zippo 200 at the Glen (Watkins Glen)
- Last race: 2012 NAPA Auto Parts 200 (Montreal)
Wins	Top tens	Poles
0	0	0

Eric Curran (born June 8, 1975) is an American race car driver who competes in the WeatherTech SportsCar Championship for Action Express Racing with co-driver Felipe Nasr. Curran and previous co-driver Dane Cameron won their first race together, the Chevrolet SportsCar Classic, in the Whelen Engineering Team Fox Corvette DP on May 30, 2015. He has three wins and four poles in the Rolex Sports Car Series. Curran joined Whelen motorsports in 2007. Curran won the WeatherTech SportsCar Championship in 2018.

== Motorsports career results ==
=== NASCAR ===
==== Nationwide Series ====
(key) (Bold – Pole position awarded by qualifying time. Italics – Pole position earned by points standings or practice time. * – Most laps led.)

NASCAR Nationwide Series results
Year	Team	No.	Make	1	2	3	4	5	6	7	8	9	10	11	12	13	14	15	16	17	18	19	20	21	22	23	24	25	26	27	28	29	30	31	32	33	NNSC	Pts	Ref
2012	NDS Motorsports	53	Dodge	DAY	PHO	LVS	BRI	CAL	TEX	RCH	TAL	DAR	IOW	CLT	DOV	MCH	ROA	KEN	DAY	NHA	CHI	IND	IOW	GLN; 34	CGV; 37	BRI	ATL	RCH	CHI	KEN	DOV	CLT	KAN	TEX	PHO	HOM	85th	17	

=== SCCA National Championship Runoffs ===
Year	Track	Car	Engine	Class	Finish	Start	Status
1999	Mid-Ohio	Chevrolet Camaro	Chevrolet	A Sedan	1	5	Running
2010	Road America	Chevrolet Camaro	Chevrolet	A Sedan	DSQ	6	Disqualified

=== 24 Hours of Daytona results ===
Year	Team	Co-drivers	Car	Class	Laps	Pos.	Class Pos.
2000	(United States) Diablo Racing	(United States) Tom Scheuren (United States) Rick Dilorio (United States) Todd Snyder (United States) Mayo T. Smith	Chevrolet Camaro	AGT	303	DNF	DNF
2001	(United States) Diablo Racing	(United States) Tom Scheuren (United States) Todd Snyder (United States) Mayo T. Smith	Chevrolet Camaro	AGT	125	DNF	DNF
2008	(United States) Farnbacher Loles Racing	(Germany) Pierre Kaffer (Germany) Frank Stippler (Canada) Dave Lacey (Canada) Greg Wilkins	Porsche 997 GT3 Cup	GT	637	22nd	12th
2011	(United States) Banner Racing	(United States) Bruce Ledoux (United States) Gunter Schaldach (United Kingdom) Oliver Gavin	Chevrolet Camaro GT.R	GT	398	DNF	DNF
2012	(United States) Stevenson Motorsports	(United States) Matt Bell (United States) Al Carter (United States) Hugh Plumb	Chevrolet Camaro GT.R	GT	577	DNF	DNF
2013	(United States) Marsh Racing	(United States) Lawson Aschenbach (United States) Brandon Davis (United States) Boris Said	Chevrolet Corvette	GT	136	DNF	DNF
2014	(United States) Marsh Racing	(United States) Boris Said (Italy) Max Papis (United Kingdom) Bradley Smith	Coyote Corvette DP	P	613	41st	10th
2015	(United States) Action Express Racing	(United States) Dane Cameron (Italy) Max Papis (United Kingdom) Phil Keen	Coyote Corvette DP	P	721	6th	4th
2016	(United States) Action Express Racing	(United States) Dane Cameron (France) Simon Pagenaud (United Kingdom) Jonathan Adam	Coyote Corvette DP	P	724	6th	6th
2017	(United States) Whelen Engineering Racing	(United States) Dane Cameron (United Kingdom) Mike Conway (United Kingdom) Seb Morris	Cadillac DPi-V.R	P	639	14th	6th
2018	(United States) Whelen Engineering Racing	(United Kingdom) Mike Conway (United Kingdom) Stuart Middleton (Brazil) Felipe Nasr	Cadillac DPi-V.R	P	808	**2nd**	**2nd**
2019	(United States) Whelen Engineering Racing	(Brazil) Felipe Nasr (Brazil) Pipo Derani	Cadillac DPi-V.R	DPi	593	**2nd**	**2nd**

=== WeatherTech SportsCar Championship results ===
(key)(Races in bold indicate pole position, Results are overall/class)

Year	Team	Class	Make	Engine	1	2	3	4	5	6	7	8	9	10	11	Rank	Points
2014	Marsh Racing	P	Coyote Corvette DP	Chevrolet 5.5L V8	DAY; 10	SEB; 12	LBH; 10	LGA; 6	DET; 10	WGL; 6	MSP; DNS	IMS; 11	ELK; 5	COA; 8	PET; 5	13th	175
2015	Action Express Racing	P	Coyote Corvette DP	Chevrolet 5.5L V8	DAY; 4	SEB; 5	LBH; 4	LGA; 5	DET; 1	WGL; 4	MSP; 2	ELK; 1	COA; 5	PET; 3		**3rd**	**304**
2016	Action Express Racing	P	Coyote Corvette DP	Chevrolet 5.5L V8	DAY; 6	SEB; 2	LBH; 3	LGA; 3	DET; 6	WGL; 2	MSP; 1	ELK; 1	COA; 2	PET; 4		**1st**	**314**
2017	Whelen Engineering Racing	P	Cadillac DPi-V.R	Cadillac 6.2 L V8	DAY; 6	SEB; 3	LBH; 8	COA; 2	DET; 2	WGL; 10^{1}	MOS; 1	ELK; 4	LGA; 2	PET; 2		2nd	291
2018	Whelen Engineering Racing	P	Cadillac DPi-V.R	Cadillac 5.5 L V8	DAY; 2	SEB; 3	LBH; 7	MOH; 8	DET; 1	WGL; 7	MSP; 3	ELK; 3	LGA; 5	PET; 8		1st	277
2019	Whelen Engineering Racing	DPi	Cadillac DPi-V.R	Cadillac 5.5 L V8	DAY; 2	SEB; 1	LBH	MOH	DET	WGL; 7	MOS	ELK	LGA	**PET**; 1		13th	126

- ^{1} – Relegated to last in class for violation of minimum drive time requirements.
