= 2018 Chevrolet Sports Car Classic =

Automobile endurance race in Detroit

The layout of The Raceway on Belle Isle

The 2018 Chevrolet Sports Car Classic was a sports car race sanctioned by the International Motor Sports Association (IMSA). The race was held at The Raceway on Belle Isle in Detroit, Michigan on June 2, 2018. The race was the fifth round of the 2018 IMSA SportsCar Championship.

== Background ==
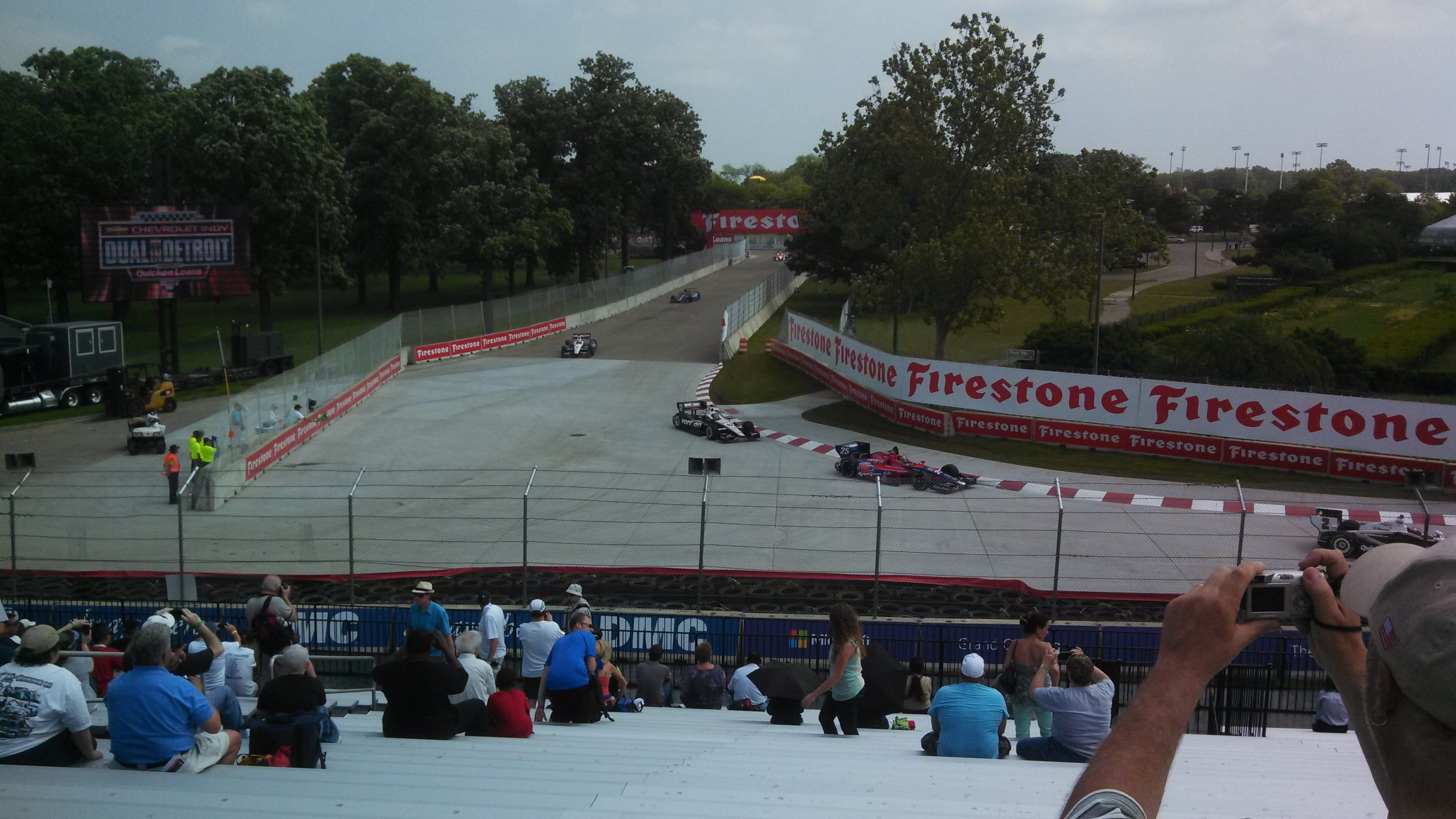
The Raceway on Belle Isle, where the race was held.

Similar to the Grand Prix of Long Beach, this event was held in conjunction with the Detroit Grand Prix in the IndyCar series, with one event held on the same day as the IMSA event, and another held a day after as a double-header.

International Motor Sports Association's (IMSA) president Scott Atherton confirmed the race was part of the schedule for the 2018 IMSA SportsCar Championship (IMSA SCC) in August 2017. It was the fifth consecutive year the event was held as part of the WeatherTech SportsCar Championship, and the ninth annual running of the race, counting the period between 2007 and 2013 when it was a round of the Rolex Sports Car Series and the American Le Mans Series respectively. The 2018 Chevrolet Sports Car Classic was the fifth of twelve scheduled sports car races of 2018 by IMSA, the shortest in terms of time, and was the third round not held on the held as part of the North American Endurance Cup. The race was held at the fourteen-turn 2.350 mi (3.782 km) Belle Isle Park on June 2, 2018. After the Sports Car Challenge of Mid-Ohio three weeks earlier, Filipe Albuquerque and João Barbosa led the Prototype Drivers' Championship with 119 points, ahead of Eric Curran and Felipe Nasr with 109 points, and Jordan Taylor and Renger van der Zande with 104 points. In GTD, the Drivers' Championship was led by Bryan Sellers and Madison Snow with 95 points, ahead of Katherine Legge and Álvaro Parente with 87 points. Cadillac and Lamborghini were leading their respective Manufacturers' Championships, while Mustang Sampling Racing and Paul Miller Racing each led their own Teams' Championships.

On May 25, 2018, IMSA released the latest technical bulletin outlining Balance of performance for the GTD class. The Lexus RC F GT3 received a 25 kilogram weight increase. The Mercedes AMG GT3 received a 10 kilogram weight break. No changes made in P.

== Entries ==
A total of 26 cars took part in the event split across two classes. 14 cars were entered in P, and 12 in GTD. In P, Spirit of Daytona Racing made their first appearance since Sebring. Performance Tech Motorsports skipped to focus on testing before the Watkins Glen round. Harry Tincknell returned to the Mazda Team Joest No. 55 entry. GTD saw a number of driver changes. Robby Foley joined Bill Auberlen in the Turner Motorsport entry while Mario Farnbacher substituted for Álvaro Parente in the Meyer Shank Racing No. 86 entry due to a clash with the Blancpain GT Series Endurance Cup round at Circuit Paul Ricard. Bernd Schneider joined Kenny Habul in the SunEnergy1 Racing entry. Jeff Segal substituted for Alessandro Balzan in the Scuderia Corsa entry due to a medical procedure.

== Practice ==
There were two practice sessions preceding the start of the race on Saturday, two on Friday. The first ninety-minute session was on Friday morning. The second on Friday afternoon lasted 110 minutes.

=== Practice 1 ===
The first practice session took place at 8:15 am ET on Friday and ended with Ricky Taylor topping the charts for Acura Team Penske, with a lap time of 1:21.909.

Pos.	Class	No.	Team	Driver	Time	Gap
1	P	7	Acura Team Penske	Ricky Taylor	1:21.909	_
2	P	31	Whelen Engineering Racing	Felipe Nasr	1:22.115	+0.206
3	P	5	Mustang Sampling Racing	João Barbosa	1:22.513	+0.604

=== Practice 2 ===
The second and final practice session took place at 1:05 pm ET on Friday and ended with Hélio Castroneves topping the charts for Acura Team Penske, with a lap time of 1:22.363.

Pos.	Class	No.	Team	Driver	Time	Gap
1	P	7	Acura Team Penske	Hélio Castroneves	1:22.363	_
2	P	22	Tequila Patrón ESM	Pipo Derani	1:22.388	+0.025
3	P	5	Mustang Sampling Racing	João Barbosa	1:22.427	+0.064

== Qualifying ==
Friday afternoon's 40-minute qualifying session was divided into two groups. Both categories had 15-minute individual sessions, and regulations stipulated teams to nominate a single driver to qualify their cars. The competitors' fastest lap times determined the starting order with the grid arranged to put the Prototype cars ahead of all GTD entries.

=== Qualifying results ===
Pole positions in each class are indicated in bold and by ‡.

Pos.	Class	No.	Team	Driver	Time	Gap	Grid
1	**P**	22	**(United States) Tequila Patrón ESM**	**(Brazil) Pipo Derani**	**1:22.273**	**_**	1‡
2	P	6	(United States) Acura Team Penske	(Colombia) Juan Pablo Montoya	1:22.992	+0.719	2
3	P	7	(United States) Acura Team Penske	(Brazil) Hélio Castroneves	1:23.275	+1.002	3
4	P	5	(United States) Mustang Sampling Racing	(Portugal) João Barbosa	1:23.278	+1.005	4
5	P	99	(United States) JDC-Miller MotorSports	(Canada) Misha Goikhberg	1:23.384	+1.111	5
6	P	31	(United States) Whelen Engineering Racing	(United States) Eric Curran	1:23.469	+1.196	6
7	P	10	(United States) Wayne Taylor Racing	(Netherlands) Renger van der Zande	1:23.558	+1.285	7
8	P	77	(Germany) Mazda Team Joest	(United States) Tristan Nunez	1:23.969	+1.696	8
9	P	55	(Germany) Mazda Team Joest	(United States) Jonathan Bomarito	1:24.566	+2.293	9
10	P	2	(United States) Tequila Patrón ESM	(United States) Scott Sharp	1:24.637	+2.364	10
11	P	90	(United States) Spirit of Daytona Racing	(United States) Matt McMurry	1:24.688	+2.415	11
12	P	52	(United States) AFS/PR1 Mathiasen Motorsports	(Colombia) Sebastián Saavedra	1:25.371	+3.098	12
13	P	54	**(United States)** CORE Autosport	(United States) Jon Bennett	1:25.741	+3.468	13
14	**GTD**	**48**	**(United States) Paul Miller Racing**	**(United States) Bryan Sellers**	**1:28.942**	**+6.669**	15‡
15	GTD	86	(United States) Meyer Shank Racing with Curb-Agajanin	(United Kingdom) Katherine Legge	1:29.390	+7.117	16
16	GTD	93	(United States) Meyer Shank Racing with Curb-Agajanin	(United States) Justin Marks	1:29.717	+7.444	17
17	GTD	14	(United States) 3GT Racing	(Austria) Dominik Baumann	1:29.787	+7.514	18
18	GTD	15	(United States) 3GT Racing	(Denmark) David Heinemeier Hansson	1:30.114	+7.814	19
19	GTD	33	(United States) Mercedes-AMG Team Riley Motorsport	(United States) Ben Keating	1:30.196	+7.923	20
20	GTD	63	(United States) Scuderia Corsa	(United States) Cooper MacNeil	1:30.282	+8.009	21
21	GTD	16	(United States) Wright Motorsports	(United States) Michael Schein	1:30.717	+8.444	22
22	GTD	75	(United States) SunEnergy1 Racing	(Australia) Kenny Habul	1:30.776	+8.503	23
23	GTD	58	(United States) Wright Motorsports	(Denmark) Christina Nielsen	1:30.878	+8.605	24
24	GTD	96	(United States) Turner Motorsport	(United States) Robby Foley	1:31.640	+9.367	25
25	GTD	44	(United States) Magnus Racing	did not participate			26^{1}
26	P	85	(United States) JDC-Miller MotorSports	(United States) Robert Alon	no time^{2}		14
Sources:

- ^{1} The No. 44 Magnus Racing entry was moved to the back of the GTD field for starting the race with a different driver than who qualified.
- ^{2} The No. 85 JDC-Miller MotorSports entry had its two fastest laps deleted as penalty for causing a red flag during its qualifying session.

== Race ==
=== Post-race ===
The result kept Albuquerque and Barbosa atop the Prototype Drivers' Championship with 144 points while Nasr and Curran tied them on points. The result kept Sellers and Snow atop the GTD Drivers' Championship with 122 points. Aschenbach and Marks advanced from sixth to fourth. Cadillac and Lamborghini continued to top their respective Manufacturers' Championships while Mustang Sampling Racing, and Paul Miller Racing kept their respective advantages in the Teams' Championships with seven rounds remaining.

=== Results ===
Class winners are denoted in bold and ‡.

Final race classification
Pos	Class	No.	Team	Drivers	Chassis	Tire	Laps	Time/Retired
Pos	Class	No.	Team	Drivers	Engine	Tire	Laps	Time/Retired
1	**P**	**31**	**(United States) Whelen Engineering Racing**	**(Brazil) Felipe Nasr (United States) Eric Curran**	**Cadillac DPi-V.R**	C	**68**	**1:40.14.245‡**
1	**P**	**31**	**(United States) Whelen Engineering Racing**	**(Brazil) Felipe Nasr (United States) Eric Curran**	**Cadillac 5.5 L V8**	C	**68**	**1:40.14.245‡**
2	P	7	(United States) Acura Team Penske	(Brazil) Hélio Castroneves (United States) Ricky Taylor	Acura ARX-05	C	68	+1.016
2	P	7	(United States) Acura Team Penske	(Brazil) Hélio Castroneves (United States) Ricky Taylor	Acura AR35TT 3.5 L Turbo V6	C	68	+1.016
3	P	6	(United States) Acura Team Penske	(United States) Dane Cameron (Colombia) Juan Pablo Montoya	Acura ARX-05	C	68	+14.127
3	P	6	(United States) Acura Team Penske	(United States) Dane Cameron (Colombia) Juan Pablo Montoya	Acura AR35TT 3.5 L Turbo V6	C	68	+14.127
4	P	2	(United States) Tequila Patrón ESM	(United Kingdom) Ryan Dalziel (United States) Scott Sharp	Nissan Onroak DPi	C	68	+45.698
4	P	2	(United States) Tequila Patrón ESM	(United Kingdom) Ryan Dalziel (United States) Scott Sharp	Nissan VR38DETT 3.8 L Turbo V6	C	68	+45.698
5	P	10	(United States) Wayne Taylor Racing	(United States) Jordan Taylor (Netherlands) Renger van der Zande	Cadillac DPi-V.R	C	68	+49.570
5	P	10	(United States) Wayne Taylor Racing	(United States) Jordan Taylor (Netherlands) Renger van der Zande	Cadillac 5.5 L V8	C	68	+49.570
6	P	5	(United States) Mustang Sampling Racing	(Portugal) Filipe Albuquerque (Portugal) João Barbosa	Cadillac DPi-V.R	C	68	+50.664
6	P	5	(United States) Mustang Sampling Racing	(Portugal) Filipe Albuquerque (Portugal) João Barbosa	Cadillac 5.5 L V8	C	68	+50.664
7	P	22	(United States) Tequila Patrón ESM	(Brazil) Pipo Derani (United States) Johannes van Overbeek	Nissan Onroak DPi	C	68	+1:16.531
7	P	22	(United States) Tequila Patrón ESM	(Brazil) Pipo Derani (United States) Johannes van Overbeek	Nissan VR38DETT 3.8 L Turbo V6	C	68	+1:16.531
8	P	52	(United States) AFS/PR1 Mathiasen Motorsports	(Colombia) Sebastián Saavedra (Colombia) Gustavo Yacamán	Ligier JS P217	C	68	+1 lap
8	P	52	(United States) AFS/PR1 Mathiasen Motorsports	(Colombia) Sebastián Saavedra (Colombia) Gustavo Yacamán	Gibson GK428 4.2 L V8	C	68	+1 lap
9 DNF	P	77	(Germany) Mazda Team Joest	(United Kingdom) Oliver Jarvis (United States) Tristan Nunez	Mazda RT24-P	C	67	Out of Fuel
9 DNF	P	77	(Germany) Mazda Team Joest	(United Kingdom) Oliver Jarvis (United States) Tristan Nunez	Mazda MZ-2.0T 2.0L Turbo I4	C	67	Out of Fuel
10	P	85	(United States) JDC-Miller MotorSports	(United States) Robert Alon (Switzerland) Simon Trummer	Oreca 07	C	67	+1 lap
10	P	85	(United States) JDC-Miller MotorSports	(United States) Robert Alon (Switzerland) Simon Trummer	Gibson GK428 4.2 L V8	C	67	+1 lap
11	P	99	(United States) JDC-Miller MotorSports	(Canada) Misha Goikhberg (South Africa) Stephen Simpson	Oreca 07	C	67	+1 lap
11	P	99	(United States) JDC-Miller MotorSports	(Canada) Misha Goikhberg (South Africa) Stephen Simpson	Gibson GK428 4.2 L V8	C	67	+1 lap
12	P	54	(United States) CORE Autosport	(United States) Jon Bennett (United States) Colin Braun	Oreca 07	C	66	+2 Laps
12	P	54	(United States) CORE Autosport	(United States) Jon Bennett (United States) Colin Braun	Gibson GK428 4.2 L V8	C	66	+2 Laps
13	**GTD**	**86**	**(United States) Meyer Shank Racing with Curb-Agajanin**	**(United Kingdom) Katherine Legge** **(Germany) Mario Farnbacher**	**Acura NSX GT3**	C	**65**	**+3 Laps‡**
13	**GTD**	**86**	**(United States) Meyer Shank Racing with Curb-Agajanin**	**(United Kingdom) Katherine Legge** **(Germany) Mario Farnbacher**	**Acura** **3.5 L Turbo V6**	C	**65**	**+3 Laps‡**
14	GTD	93	(United States) Meyer Shank Racing with Curb-Agajanin	(United States) Justin Marks (United States) Lawson Aschenbach	Acura NSX GT3	C	65	+3 Laps
14	GTD	93	(United States) Meyer Shank Racing with Curb-Agajanin	(United States) Justin Marks (United States) Lawson Aschenbach	Acura 3.5 L Turbo V6	C	65	+3 Laps
15	GTD	48	(United States) Paul Miller Racing	(United States) Bryan Sellers (United States) Madison Snow	Lamborghini Huracán GT3	C	64	+4 Laps
15	GTD	48	(United States) Paul Miller Racing	(United States) Bryan Sellers (United States) Madison Snow	Lamborghini 5.2 L V10	C	64	+4 Laps
16	GTD	33	(United States) Mercedes-AMG Team Riley Motorsport	(Netherlands) Jeroen Bleekemolen (United States) Ben Keating	Mercedes AMG GT3	C	64	+4 Laps
16	GTD	33	(United States) Mercedes-AMG Team Riley Motorsport	(Netherlands) Jeroen Bleekemolen (United States) Ben Keating	Mercedes-AMG M159 6.2 L V8	C	64	+4 Laps
17	GTD	63	(United States) Scuderia Corsa	(United States) Jeff Segal (United States) Cooper MacNeil	Ferrari 488 GT3	C	64	+4 Laps
17	GTD	63	(United States) Scuderia Corsa	(United States) Jeff Segal (United States) Cooper MacNeil	Ferrari F154CB 3.9 L Turbo V8	C	64	+4 Laps
18	GTD	14	(United States) 3GT Racing	(Austria) Dominik Baumann (Canada) Kyle Marcelli	Lexus RC F GT3	C	64	+4 Laps
18	GTD	14	(United States) 3GT Racing	(Austria) Dominik Baumann (Canada) Kyle Marcelli	Lexus 5.0L V8	C	64	+4 Laps
19	GTD	96	(United States) Turner Motorsport	(United States) Robby Foley (United States) Bill Auberlen	BMW M6 GT3	C	64	+4 Laps
19	GTD	96	(United States) Turner Motorsport	(United States) Robby Foley (United States) Bill Auberlen	BMW 4.4 L Turbo V8	C	64	+4 Laps
20	GTD	75	(United States) SunEnergy1 Racing	(Australia) Kenny Habul (Germany) Bernd Schneider	Mercedes AMG GT3	C	64	+4 Laps
20	GTD	75	(United States) SunEnergy1 Racing	(Australia) Kenny Habul (Germany) Bernd Schneider	Mercedes-AMG M159 6.2 L V8	C	64	+4 Laps
21	GTD	16	(United States) Wright Motorsports	(United States) Michael Schein (Germany) Wolf Henzler	Porsche 911 GT3 R	C	64	+4 Laps
21	GTD	16	(United States) Wright Motorsports	(United States) Michael Schein (Germany) Wolf Henzler	Porsche 4.0 L Flat-6	C	64	+4 Laps
22	GTD	44	(United States) Magnus Racing	(United States) John Potter (United States) Andy Lally	Audi R8 LMS GT3	C	64	+4 Laps
22	GTD	44	(United States) Magnus Racing	(United States) John Potter (United States) Andy Lally	Audi 5.2L V10	C	64	+4 Laps
23	GTD	58	(United States) Wright Motorsports	(United States) Patrick Long (Denmark) Christina Nielsen	Porsche 911 GT3 R	C	64	+4 Laps
23	GTD	58	(United States) Wright Motorsports	(United States) Patrick Long (Denmark) Christina Nielsen	Porsche 4.0 L Flat-6	C	64	+4 Laps
24 DNF	P	90	(United States) Spirit of Daytona Racing	(United States) Matt McMurry (France) Tristan Vautier	Cadillac DPi-V.R	C	35	Did Not Finish
24 DNF	P	90	(United States) Spirit of Daytona Racing	(United States) Matt McMurry (France) Tristan Vautier	Cadillac 5.5 L V8	C	35	Did Not Finish
25 DNF	GTD	15	(United States) 3GT Racing	(United Kingdom) Jack Hawksworth (Denmark) David Heinemeier Hansson	Lexus RC F GT3	C	10	Crash
25 DNF	GTD	15	(United States) 3GT Racing	(United Kingdom) Jack Hawksworth (Denmark) David Heinemeier Hansson	Lexus 5.0L V8	C	10	Crash
26 DNF	P	55	(Germany) Mazda Team Joest	(United States) Jonathan Bomarito (United Kingdom) Harry Tincknell	Mazda RT24-P	C	6	Drivetrain
26 DNF	P	55	(Germany) Mazda Team Joest	(United States) Jonathan Bomarito (United Kingdom) Harry Tincknell	Mazda MZ-2.0T 2.0L Turbo I4	C	6	Drivetrain

Tyre manufacturers
Key
Symbol	Tyre manufacturer
**C**	Continental
**M**	Michelin

== Standings after the race ==
Prototype Drivers' Championship standings
Pos.	+/–	Driver	Points
1		(Portugal) Filipe Albuquerque (Portugal) João Barbosa	144
2		(United States) Eric Curran (Brazil) Felipe Nasr	144
3	1	(Brazil) Hélio Castroneves (United States) Ricky Taylor	130
4	1	(United States) Jordan Taylor (Netherlands) Renger van der Zande	130
5	1	(United States) Dane Cameron (Colombia) Juan Pablo Montoya	126

GTLM Drivers' Championship standings
Pos.	+/–	Driver	Points
1		(Australia) Ryan Briscoe (United Kingdom) Richard Westbrook	121
2		(New Zealand) Earl Bamber (Belgium) Laurens Vanthoor	114
3		(United States) Joey Hand (Germany) Dirk Müller	112
4		(United Kingdom) Oliver Gavin (United States) Tommy Milner	111
5		(Spain) Antonio García (Denmark) Jan Magnussen	111

GTD Drivers' Championship standings
Pos.	+/–	Driver	Points
1		(United States) Bryan Sellers (United States) Madison Snow	125
2		(United Kingdom) Katherine Legge	122
3		(Netherlands) Jeroen Bleekemolen (United States) Ben Keating	108
4	2	(United States) Lawson Aschenbach (United States) Justin Marks	102
5	1	(United States) Cooper MacNeil	102

- Note: Only the top five positions are included for all sets of standings.

Prototype Teams' Championship standings
Pos.	+/–	Team	Points
1		(United States) No. 5 Mustang Sampling Racing	144
2		(United States) No. 31 Whelen Engineering Racing	144
3	1	(United States) No. 7 Acura Team Penske	130
4	1	(United States) No. 10 Wayne Taylor Racing	130
5	1	(United States) No. 6 Acura Team Penske	126

GTLM Teams' Championship standings
Pos.	+/–	Team	Points
1		(United States) No. 67 Ford Chip Ganassi Racing	121
2		(United States) No. 912 Porsche GT Team	114
3		(United States) No. 66 Ford Chip Ganassi Racing	112
4		(United States) No. 4 Corvette Racing	111
5		(United States) No. 3 Corvette Racing	111

GTD Teams' Championship standings
Pos.	+/–	Team	Points
1		(United States) No. 48 Paul Miller Racing	125
2		(United States) No. 86 Meyer Shank Racing with Curb-Agajanin	122
3		(United States) No. 33 Mercedes-AMG Team Riley Motorsports	108
4	2	(United States) No. 93 Meyer Shank Racing with Curb-Agajanin	102
5	1	(United States) No. 63 Scuderia Corsa	102

- Note: Only the top five positions are included for all sets of standings.

Prototype Manufacturers' Championship standings
Pos.	+/–	Manufacturer	Points
1		(United States) Cadillac	167
2	1	(United States) Acura	155
3	1	(Japan) Nissan	153
4		(Japan) Mazda	150

GTLM Manufacturers' Championship standings
Pos.	+/–	Manufacturer	Points
1		(Germany) Porsche	126
2		(United States) Ford	125
3		(United States) Chevrolet	123
4		(Germany) BMW	120
5		(Italy) Ferrari	58

GTD Manufacturers' Championship standings
Pos.	+/–	Manufacturer	Points
1		(Italy) Lamborghini	132
2		(United States) Acura	123
3	2	(Germany) Mercedes-AMG	114
4		(Italy) Ferrari	113
5	2	(Japan) Lexus	112

- Note: Only the top five positions are included for all sets of standings.

IMSA SportsCar Championship
Previous race: Sports Car Challenge of Mid-Ohio	2018 season	Next race: 6 Hours of The Glen
