= 2020 Acura Sports Car Challenge at Mid-Ohio =

Seventh round of the 2020 IMSA SportsCar Championship season

Track map of Mid-Ohio Sports Car Course

The 2020 Acura Sports Car Challenge at Mid-Ohio was a sports car race sanctioned by the International Motor Sports Association (IMSA). The race was held at Mid-Ohio Sports Car Course in Lexington, Ohio, on September 27, 2020. This race was the seventh round of the 2020 WeatherTech SportsCar Championship, and the fifth round of the 2020 WeatherTech Sprint Cup.

Hélio Castroneves and Ricky Taylor claimed their third consecutive overall victory for Acura Team Penske, while Antonio García and Jordan Taylor were crowned victors in GTLM for the fourth time that season. In GTD, Jack Hawksworth and Aaron Telitz of AIM Vasser Sullivan similarly scored their third class victory of the season.

== Background ==
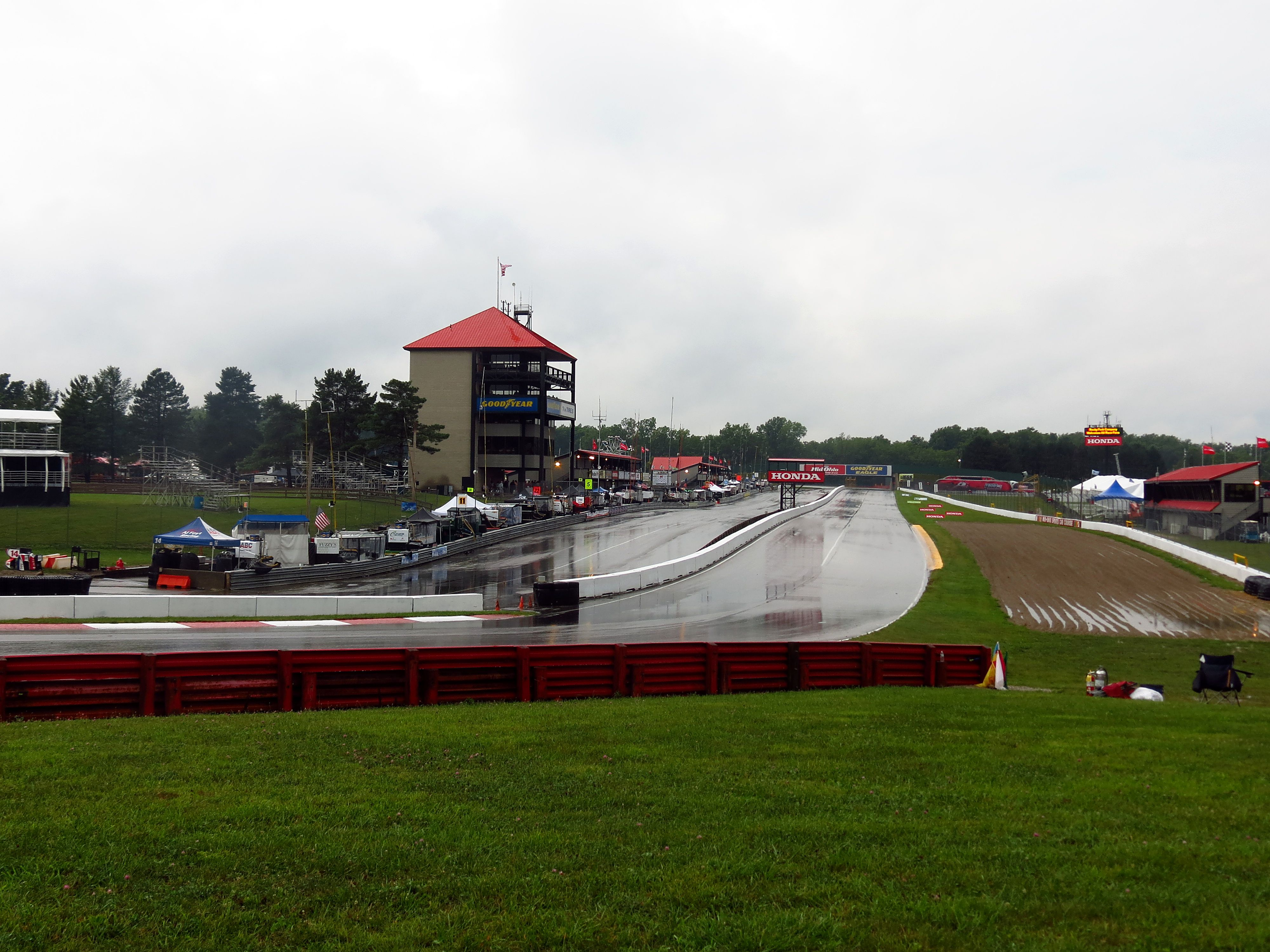
Mid-Ohio Sports Car Course, where the race was held.

Then International Motor Sports Association's (IMSA) president Scott Atherton confirmed the race was part of the schedule for the 2020 IMSA SportsCar Championship (IMSA SCC) in August 2019. It was the third consecutive year it was part of the IMSA SCC. The event was the seventh of eleven sports car races of 2020 by IMSA, and the fifth of seven races on the WeatherTech Sprint Cup. The event was one of the first postponed by IMSA as a result of the emerging COVID-19 pandemic, with the organization citing CDC regulations on public gatherings as the official cause of postponement. A tentative reschedule for the weekend of September 27 followed shortly thereafter, which became the finalized date on which the race was held. As with most events on the 2020 calendar, the race was held with a limited number of spectators in accordance with Ohio Department of Health guidelines. A maximum of 6,000 spectators were permitted, facemasks were required, temperature checks were instituted, and paddock access was restricted. Acura Team Penske duo Dane Cameron and Juan Pablo Montoya entered the race as defending champions.

On September 11, 2020, IMSA released their latest technical bulletin outlining BoP for the race. The DPi class featured changes to fuel capacity, as the Cadillac and Mazda received three liter fuel capacity increases. No changes were made to GTLM competitors. In GTD, the Acura received a decreased fuel capacity of one liter, while the Porsche and Lexus received increases of one and two liters respectively. The Aston Martin also received a 30 kilogram weight decrease.

Before the race, Ryan Briscoe and Renger van der Zande led the DPi Drivers' Championship with 150 points, ahead of Sébastien Bourdais and João Barbosa in second with 146 points, and Pipo Derani in third with 145 points. Antonio García and Jordan Taylor led the GTLM Drivers' Championship with 191 points, 14 points ahead of Oliver Gavin and Tommy Milner in second. With 150 points, the GTD Drivers' Championship was led by Mario Farnbacher and Matt McMurry, ahead of Aaron Telitz. Cadillac, Chevrolet, and Acura were leading their respective Manufactures' Championships while Konica Minolta Cadillac DPi-V.R, Corvette Racing, and Meyer Shank Racing with Curb-Agajanian each led their own Teams' Championships.

=== Entries ===
A total of 24 cars took part in the event, split across three classes. 8 were entered in DPi, 4 in GTLM, and 12 in GTD. JDC-Miller Motorsports' driver lineup once again shuffled, as Matheus Leist and Stephen Simpson were replaced by Tristan Vautier and Gabriel Aubry. Porsche's factory GTLM effort was sidelined at Mid-Ohio after positive COVID-19 tests within the team's 24 Hours of Le Mans camp, which had competed the previous weekend with much of their IMSA cohort in attendance. As a result, the already anemic GTLM class was further reduced to just four competitors. GTD featured a late withdrawal of the Scuderia Corsa Ferrari, as driver Cooper MacNeil was competing in both Ferrari Challenge and IMSA competition, and was leading the championship of the former. The Ferrari Challenge was racing at Laguna Seca, so MacNeil's IMSA entry was pulled from the Mid-Ohio race.

== Practice ==
There were two practice sessions preceding the start of the race on Sunday, one on Friday and one on Saturday. The first session lasted one hour on Friday while the second session on Saturday lasted 75 minutes.

=== Practice 1 ===
The first practice session took place at 6:00 pm ET on Friday and ended with Juan Pablo Montoya topping the charts for Acura Team Penske, with a lap time of 1:13.057. Antonio García was fastest in GTLM with a time of 1:19.690. Bill Auberlen set the fastest time in GTD.

Pos.	Class	No.	Team	Driver	Time	Gap
1	DPi	6	Acura Team Penske	Juan Pablo Montoya	1:13.057	_
2	DPi	31	Whelen Engineering Racing	Pipo Derani	1:13.293	+0.236
3	DPi	7	Acura Team Penske	Ricky Taylor	1:13.302	+0.245

=== Practice 2 ===
The second and final practice session took place at 10:55 am ET on Saturday and ended with Hélio Castroneves topping the charts for Acura Team Penske, with a lap time of 1:11.395. Jordan Taylor set the fastest time in GTLM. Aaron Telitz was fastest in GTD with a time of 1:20.465.

Pos.	Class	No.	Team	Driver	Time	Gap
1	DPi	7	Acura Team Penske	Hélio Castroneves	1:11.395	_
2	DPi	10	Konica Minolta Cadillac	Renger van der Zande	1:11.587	+0.192
3	DPi	6	Acura Team Penske	Dane Cameron	1:11.645	+0.250

== Qualifying ==
Sunday's morning qualifying was broken into three sessions, with one session for the DPi, GTLM, and GTD classes, which lasted for 15 minutes each, and a ten minute interval between the sessions. The rules dictated that all teams nominated a driver to qualify their cars, with the Pro-Am (GTD) class requiring a Bronze/Silver Rated Driver to qualify the car. The competitors' fastest lap times determined the starting order. IMSA then arranged the grid to put DPis ahead of the GTLM and GTD cars.

The first was for cars in the GTD class. Aaron Telitz qualified on pole for the class driving the #14 car for AIM Vasser Sullivan, besting Matt McMurry in the #86 Meyer Shank Racing with Curb-Agajanian entry.

The second session was for cars in the GTLM class. Jordan Taylor qualified on pole driving the #3 car for Corvette Racing, beating Jesse Krohn in the #24 BMW Team RLL entry by over four-tenths of a second.

The final session of qualifying was for cars in the DPi class. Dane Cameron qualified on pole driving the #6 car for Acura Team Penske, beating teammate Hélio Castroneves in the sister #7 Acura Team Penske entry by less than less than twenty-hundredths of a second.

=== Qualifying results ===
Pole positions in each class are indicated in bold and by ‡.

Pos.	Class	No.	Team	Driver	Time	Gap	Grid
1	**DPi**	**6**	**(United States) Acura Team Penske**	**(United States) Dane Cameron**	**1:10.839**	**_**	1‡
2	DPi	7	(United States) Acura Team Penske	(Brazil) Hélio Castroneves	1:10.855	+0.016	2
3	DPi	55	(Canada) Mazda Motorsports	(United States) Jonathan Bomarito	1:11.004	+0.165	3
4	DPi	31	(United States) Whelen Engineering Racing	(Brazil) Pipo Derani	1:11.067	+0.228	4
5	DPi	10	(United States) Konica Minolta Cadillac	(Australia) Ryan Briscoe	1:11.271	+0.432	5
6	DPi	77	(Canada) Mazda Motorsports	(United Kingdom) Oliver Jarvis	1:11.365	+0.526	6
7	DPi	5	(United States) JDC-Mustang Sampling Racing	(France) Sébastien Bourdais	1:11.382	+0.543	7
8	DPi	85	(United States) JDC-Miller MotorSports	(France) Gabriel Aubry	1:12.081	+1.242	8
9	**GTLM**	**3**	**(United States) Corvette Racing**	**(United States) Jordan Taylor**	**1:17.985**	**+7.146**	9^{1}‡
10	GTLM	24	(United States) BMW Team RLL	(Finland) Jesse Krohn	1:18.361	+7.522	12^{2}
11	GTLM	4	(United States) Corvette Racing	(United Kingdom) Oliver Gavin	1:18.448	+7.609	10^{3}
12	GTLM	25	(United States) BMW Team RLL	(Canada) Bruno Spengler	1:18.515	+7.676	11^{4}
13	**GTD**	**14**	**(Canada) AIM Vasser Sullivan**	**(United States) Aaron Telitz**	**1:20.974**	**+10.135**	13‡
14	GTD	86	(United States) Meyer Shank Racing with Curb-Agajanian	(United States) Matt McMurry	1:21.089	+10.250	14
15	GTD	57	(United States) Heinricher Racing with MSR Curb-Agajanian	(Canada) Misha Goikhberg	1:21.196	+10.357	15
16	GTD	76	(United States) Compass Racing	(United States) Corey Fergus	1:21.302	+10.463	24^{5}
17	GTD	96	(United States) Turner Motorsport	(United States) Robby Foley	1:21.364	+10.525	16
18	GTD	23	(United States) Heart of Racing Team	(United Kingdom) Ian James	1:21.431	+10.592	17
19	GTD	12	(Canada) AIM Vasser Sullivan	(United States) Frankie Montecalvo	1:21.442	+10.603	18
20	GTD	16	(United States) Wright Motorsports	(United States) Ryan Hardwick	1:21.659	+10.820	19
21	GTD	22	(United States) Gradient Racing	(United Kingdom) Till Bechtolsheimer	1:22.189	+11.350	20
22	GTD	74	(United States) Riley Motorsports	(United States) Gar Robinson	1:22.254	+11.415	22^{6}
23	GTD	44	(United States) GRT Magnus	(United States) John Potter	1:22.388	+11.549	21
24	GTD	30	(United States) Team Hardpoint	(United States) Rob Ferriol	1:22.855	+12.016	23^{7}
Sources:

- ^{1} The No. 3 Corvette Racing entry was moved to the back of the GTLM field as per Article 40.1.4 of the Sporting regulations (Change of starting tires).
- ^{2} The No. 24 BMW Team RLL was moved to the back of the GTLM field as per Article 40.1.4 of the Sporting regulations (Change of starting tires).
- ^{3} The No. 4 Corvette Racing entry was moved to the back of the GTLM field as per Article 40.1.4 of the Sporting regulations (Change of starting tires).
- ^{4} The No. 25 BMW Team RLL entry was moved to the back of the GTLM field as per Article 40.1.4 of the Sporting regulations (Change of starting tires).
- ^{5} The No. 76 Compass Racing entry was moved to the back of the GTD field for violating competition rules regarding the car's ride height.
- ^{6} The No. 74 Riley Motorsports entry was moved to the back of the GTD field as per Article 40.1.4 of the Sporting regulations (Change of starting tires).
- ^{7} The No. 30 Team Hardpoint entry was moved to the back of the GTD field as per Article 40.1.4 of the Sporting regulations (Change of starting tires).

== Race ==
=== Post-race ===
As a result of winning the race, Hélio Castroneves and Ricky Taylor advanced from sixth to third in the DPi Drivers' Championship. Bourdais and Barbosa dropped from second to fifth while Derani moved from third to second. With 226 points, Antonio García and Jordan Taylors' victory allowed them to increase their advantage over Gavin and Milner to 17 points. The result kept Farnbacher and McMurry atop the GTD Drivers' Championship, 3 points ahead of race winner Telitz. Hardwick and Long advanced from fifth to fourth while Aschenbach and Robinson jumped from sixth to fifth. Cadillac and Chevrolet continued to top their respective Manufacturers' Championships while Lexus took the lead of the GTD Manufactures' Championship. Konica Minolta Cadillac DPi-V.R, Corvette Racing, and Meyer Shank Racing with Curb-Agajanian kept their respective advantages in Teams' Championships with four rounds remaining in the season.

=== Results ===
Class winners are denoted in bold and ‡.

Pos	Class	No.	Team	Drivers	Chassis	Laps	Time/retired
Pos	Class	No.	Team	Drivers	Engine	Laps	Time/retired
1	**DPi**	**7**	**(United States) Acura Team Penske**	**(Brazil) Hélio Castroneves (United States) Ricky Taylor**	**Acura ARX-05**	**115**	**2:40:07.918‡**
1	**DPi**	**7**	**(United States) Acura Team Penske**	**(Brazil) Hélio Castroneves (United States) Ricky Taylor**	**Acura AR35TT 3.5L Turbo V6**	**115**	**2:40:07.918‡**
2	DPi	31	(United States) Whelen Engineering Racing	(Brazil) Pipo Derani (Brazil) Felipe Nasr	Cadillac DPi-V.R	115	+0.607
2	DPi	31	(United States) Whelen Engineering Racing	(Brazil) Pipo Derani (Brazil) Felipe Nasr	Cadillac 5.5L V8	115	+0.607
3	DPi	10	(United States) Konica Minolta Cadillac	(Australia) Ryan Briscoe (Netherlands) Renger van der Zande	Cadillac DPi-V.R	115	+15.861
3	DPi	10	(United States) Konica Minolta Cadillac	(Australia) Ryan Briscoe (Netherlands) Renger van der Zande	Cadillac 5.5L V8	115	+15.861
4	DPi	55	(Canada) Mazda Motorsports	(United States) Jonathan Bomarito (United Kingdom) Harry Tincknell	Mazda RT24-P	115	+16.433
4	DPi	55	(Canada) Mazda Motorsports	(United States) Jonathan Bomarito (United Kingdom) Harry Tincknell	Mazda MZ-2.0T 2.0L Turbo I4	115	+16.433
5	DPi	77	(Canada) Mazda Motorsports	(United Kingdom) Oliver Jarvis (United States) Tristan Nunez	Mazda RT24-P	115	+20.646
5	DPi	77	(Canada) Mazda Motorsports	(United Kingdom) Oliver Jarvis (United States) Tristan Nunez	Mazda MZ-2.0T 2.0L Turbo I4	115	+20.646
6	DPi	5	(United States) JDC-Mustang Sampling Racing	(Portugal) João Barbosa (France) Sébastien Bourdais	Cadillac DPi-V.R	115	+24.257
6	DPi	5	(United States) JDC-Mustang Sampling Racing	(Portugal) João Barbosa (France) Sébastien Bourdais	Cadillac 5.5L V8	115	+24.257
7 DNF	DPi	6	(United States) Acura Team Penske	(United States) Dane Cameron (Colombia) Juan Pablo Montoya	Acura ARX-05	112	Did not finish
7 DNF	DPi	6	(United States) Acura Team Penske	(United States) Dane Cameron (Colombia) Juan Pablo Montoya	Acura AR35TT 3.5L Turbo V6	112	Did not finish
8	**GTLM**	**3**	**(United States) Corvette Racing**	**(Spain) Antonio García (United States) Jordan Taylor**	**Chevrolet Corvette C8.R**	**110**	**+5 Laps‡**
8	**GTLM**	**3**	**(United States) Corvette Racing**	**(Spain) Antonio García (United States) Jordan Taylor**	**Chevrolet 5.5L V8**	**110**	**+5 Laps‡**
9	GTLM	4	(United States) Corvette Racing	(United Kingdom) Oliver Gavin (United States) Tommy Milner	Chevrolet Corvette C8.R	110	+5 Laps
9	GTLM	4	(United States) Corvette Racing	(United Kingdom) Oliver Gavin (United States) Tommy Milner	Chevrolet 5.5L V8	110	+5 Laps
10	GTLM	25	(United States) BMW Team RLL	(United States) Connor De Phillippi (Canada) Bruno Spengler	BMW M8 GTE	110	+5 Laps
10	GTLM	25	(United States) BMW Team RLL	(United States) Connor De Phillippi (Canada) Bruno Spengler	BMW S63 4.0L Turbo V8	110	+5 Laps
11	GTLM	24	(United States) BMW Team RLL	(United States) John Edwards (Finland) Jesse Krohn	BMW M8 GTE	110	+5 Laps
11	GTLM	24	(United States) BMW Team RLL	(United States) John Edwards (Finland) Jesse Krohn	BMW S63 4.0L Turbo V8	110	+5 Laps
12	**GTD**	**14**	**(Canada) AIM Vasser Sullivan**	**(United Kingdom) Jack Hawksworth (United States) Aaron Telitz**	**Lexus RC F GT3**	**108**	**+7 Laps‡**
12	**GTD**	**14**	**(Canada) AIM Vasser Sullivan**	**(United Kingdom) Jack Hawksworth (United States) Aaron Telitz**	**Lexus 5.0L V8**	**108**	**+7 Laps‡**
13	GTD	74	(United States) Riley Motorsports	(United States) Lawson Aschenbach (United States) Gar Robinson	Mercedes-AMG GT3 Evo	108	+7 Laps
13	GTD	74	(United States) Riley Motorsports	(United States) Lawson Aschenbach (United States) Gar Robinson	Mercedes-AMG M159 6.2L V8	108	+7 Laps
14	GTD	16	(United States) Wright Motorsports	(United States) Ryan Hardwick (United States) Patrick Long	Porsche 911 GT3 R	108	+7 Laps
14	GTD	16	(United States) Wright Motorsports	(United States) Ryan Hardwick (United States) Patrick Long	Porsche 4.0L Flat-6	108	+7 Laps
15	GTD	23	(United States) Heart of Racing Team	(Canada) Roman De Angelis (United Kingdom) Ian James	Aston Martin Vantage GT3	108	+7 Laps
15	GTD	23	(United States) Heart of Racing Team	(Canada) Roman De Angelis (United Kingdom) Ian James	Aston Martin 4.0L Turbo V8	108	+7 Laps
16	GTD	86	(United States) Meyer Shank Racing w/ Curb-Agajanian	(Germany) Mario Farnbacher (United States) Matt McMurry	Acura NSX GT3 Evo	108	+7 Laps
16	GTD	86	(United States) Meyer Shank Racing w/ Curb-Agajanian	(Germany) Mario Farnbacher (United States) Matt McMurry	Acura 3.5L Turbo V6	108	+7 Laps
17	GTD	57	(United States) Heinricher Racing w/ MSR Curb-Agajanian	(Canada) Mikhail Goikhberg (Portugal) Álvaro Parente	Acura NSX GT3 Evo	108	+7 Laps
17	GTD	57	(United States) Heinricher Racing w/ MSR Curb-Agajanian	(Canada) Mikhail Goikhberg (Portugal) Álvaro Parente	Acura 3.5L Turbo V6	108	+7 Laps
18	GTD	44	(United States) GRT Magnus Racing Team	(United States) Andy Lally (United States) John Potter	Lamborghini Huracán GT3 Evo	108	+7 Laps
18	GTD	44	(United States) GRT Magnus Racing Team	(United States) Andy Lally (United States) John Potter	Lamborghini 5.2L V10	108	+7 Laps
19	GTD	76	(United States) Compass Racing	(United States) Corey Fergus (United States) Paul Holton	McLaren 720S GT3	108	+7 Laps
19	GTD	76	(United States) Compass Racing	(United States) Corey Fergus (United States) Paul Holton	McLaren M840T 4.0L Turbo V8	108	+7 Laps
20	GTD	22	(United States) Gradient Racing	(United Kingdom) Till Bechtolsheimer (United States) Marc Miller	Acura NSX GT3 Evo	107	+8 Laps
20	GTD	22	(United States) Gradient Racing	(United Kingdom) Till Bechtolsheimer (United States) Marc Miller	Acura 3.5L Turbo V6	107	+8 Laps
21	GTD	12	(Canada) AIM Vasser Sullivan	(United States) Townsend Bell (United States) Frankie Montecalvo	Lexus RC F GT3	87	+28 Laps
21	GTD	12	(Canada) AIM Vasser Sullivan	(United States) Townsend Bell (United States) Frankie Montecalvo	Lexus 5.0L V8	87	+28 Laps
22 DNF	DPi	85	(United States) JDC-Miller MotorSports	(France) Gabriel Aubry (France) Tristan Vautier	Cadillac DPi-V.R	86	Did not finish
22 DNF	DPi	85	(United States) JDC-Miller MotorSports	(France) Gabriel Aubry (France) Tristan Vautier	Cadillac 5.5L V8	86	Did not finish
23	GTD	96	(United States) Turner Motorsport	(United States) Bill Auberlen (United States) Robby Foley	BMW M6 GT3	83	+32 Laps
23	GTD	96	(United States) Turner Motorsport	(United States) Bill Auberlen (United States) Robby Foley	BMW 4.4L Turbo V8	83	+32 Laps
24 DNF	GTD	30	(United States) Team Hardpoint	(United States) Rob Ferriol (United States) Spencer Pumpelly	Audi R8 LMS Evo	60	Did not finish
24 DNF	GTD	30	(United States) Team Hardpoint	(United States) Rob Ferriol (United States) Spencer Pumpelly	Audi 5.2L V10	60	Did not finish

== Standings after the race ==
DPi Drivers' Championship standings
Pos.	+/–	Driver	Points
1		(Australia) Ryan Briscoe (Netherlands) Renger van der Zande	180
2	1	(Brazil) Pipo Derani	177
3	3	(Brazil) Helio Castroneves (United States) Ricky Taylor	175
4		(United States) Jonathan Bomarito (United Kingdom) Harry Tincknell	172
5	3	(France) Sébastien Bourdais (Portugal) João Barbosa	171

LMP2 Drivers' Championship standings
Pos.	+/–	Driver	Points
1		(United States) Patrick Kelly	98
2		(United States) Dwight Merriman (United Kingdom) Kyle Tilley	92
3		(Canada) Cameron Cassels	64
4		(Switzerland) Simon Trummer	63
5		(Sweden) Henrik Hedman	61

GTLM Drivers' Championship standings
Pos.	+/–	Driver	Points
1		(Spain) Antonio García (United States) Jordan Taylor	226
2		(United Kingdom) Oliver Gavin (United States) Tommy Milner	209
3		(United States) Connor De Phillippi (Canada) Bruno Spengler	204
4		(United States) John Edwards (Finland) Jesse Krohn	199
5		(New Zealand) Earl Bamber (Belgium) Laurens Vanthoor	171

GTD Drivers' Championship standings
Pos.	+/–	Driver	Points
1		(Germany) Mario Farnbacher (United States) Matt McMurry	176
2		(United States) Aaron Telitz	173
3		(United Kingdom) Jack Hawksworth	171
4	1	(United States) Ryan Hardwick (United States) Patrick Long	164
5	1	(United States) Lawson Aschenbach (United States) Gar Robinson	160

- Note: Only the top five positions are included for all sets of standings.

DPi Teams' Championship standings
Pos.	+/–	Team	Points
1		(United States) #10 Konica Minolta Cadillac DPi-V.R	180
2	1	(United States) #31 Whelen Engineering Racing	177
3	1	(United States) #7 Acura Team Penske	175
4		(Canada) #55 Mazda Motorsports	172
5	3	(United States) #5 Mustang Sampling Racing / JDC-Miller MotorSports	171

LMP2 Teams' Championship standings
Pos.	+/–	Team	Points
1		(United States) #52 PR1/Mathiasen Motorsports	98
2		(United States) #18 Era Motorsport	92
3		(United States) #38 Performance Tech Motorsports	64
4		(United States) #81 DragonSpeed USA	61
5		(United States) #8 Tower Motorsport by Starworks	28

GTLM Teams' Championship standings
Pos.	+/–	Team	Points
1		(United States) #3 Corvette Racing	226
2		(United States) #4 Corvette Racing	209
3		(United States) #25 BMW Team RLL	204
4		(United States) #24 BMW Team RLL	199
5		(United States) #912 Porsche GT Team	171

GTD Teams' Championship standings
Pos.	+/–	Team	Points
1		(United States) #86 Meyer Shank Racing with Curb-Agajanian	176
2		(Canada) #14 AIM Vasser Sullivan	171
3	1	(United States) #16 Wright Motorsports	164
4	1	(United States) #74 Riley Motorsports	160
5	2	(Canada) #12 AIM Vasser Sullivan	155

- Note: Only the top five positions are included for all sets of standings.

DPi Manufacturers' Championship standings
Pos.	+/–	Manufacturer	Points
1		(United States) Cadillac	196
2	1	(Japan) Acura	195
3	1	(Japan) Mazda	191

GTLM Manufacturers' Championship standings
Pos.	+/–	Manufacturer	Points
1		(United States) Chevrolet	237
2		(Germany) BMW	226
3		(Germany) Porsche	186
4		(Italy) Ferrari	28

GTD Manufacturers' Championship standings
Pos.	+/–	Manufacturer	Points
1	1	(Japan) Lexus	183
2	1	(Japan) Acura	182
3	1	(Germany) Porsche	170
4	2	(Germany) Mercedes-AMG	167
5	2	(Italy) Lamborghini	165

- Note: Only the top five positions are included for all sets of standings.

IMSA SportsCar Championship
Previous race: 2020 TireRack.com Grand Prix at Road Atlanta	2020 season	Next race: 2020 MOTUL 100% Synthetic Grand Prix
