= Cadillac DPi-V.R =

Sports prototype racing car

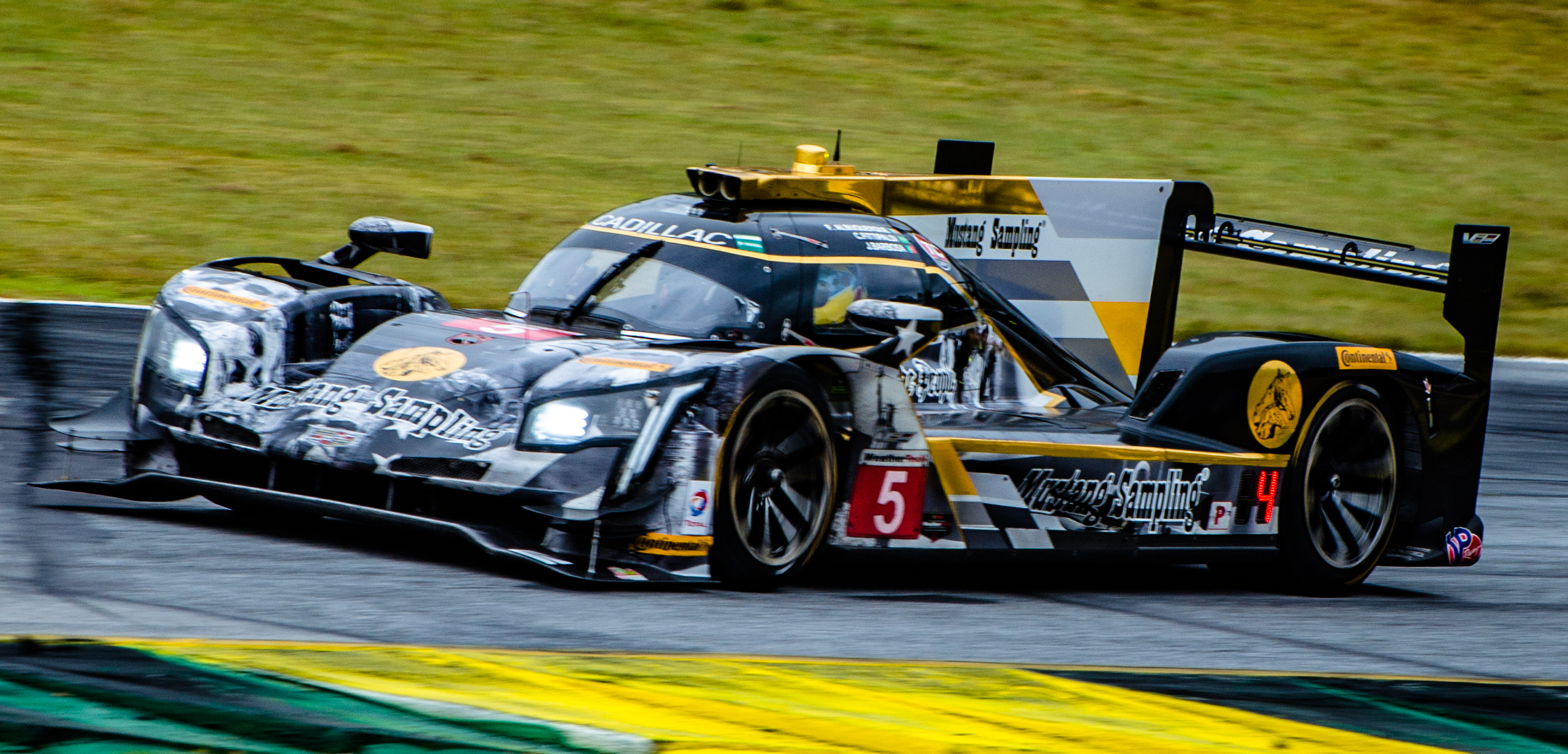
- The No. 5 Mustang Sampling Racing DPi-V.R at the 2017 Petit Le Mans
- Category: DPi
- Constructor: Cadillac (Dallara)
- Designers: Dillon Blanski (Exterior Designer); Antonio Montanari (Lead Chassis Designer, Dallara); Luca Dell'Osso (Lead Aerodynamicist, Dallara)
- Predecessor: Cadillac Northstar LMP; Corvette Daytona Prototype
- Successor: Cadillac V-Series.R (LMDh)

Technical specifications
- Chassis: Carbon-fibre monocoque with aluminium honeycomb and Zylon side panels
- Suspension (front): Double wishbone independent pushrod
- Suspension (rear): As front
- Length: 187 in (4,750 mm)
- Width: 74.8 in (1,900 mm)
- Height: 45.3 in (1,151 mm)
- Wheelbase: 118.5 in (3,010 mm)
- Engine: ECR Engines designed, developed, and produced 4.06 in. bore blocks (2014 – present) Cadillac LT4 5.5 L (336 cu in) (2018–2022) V8 naturally-aspirated engine, mid-engined, longitudinally mounted
- Transmission: Xtrac P1159F 6-speed sequential semi-automatic paddle-shift
- Power: 600 hp (447 kW) @ 6,800 rpm later 580 hp (433 kW) @ 7,050 rpm (series restricted power level)
- Weight: 930 kg (2,050 lb) including driver and fuel
- Fuel: VP Racing Fuels MS100 RON unleaded 80% + E20 American Ethanol 20%
- Lubricants: Valvoline (Wayne Taylor Racing), Lucas Oil (Action Express Racing) and Red Line Synthetic Oil (JDC–Miller MotorSports)
- Tyres: Continental (2017–2018); Michelin (2019–2022)

Competition history
- Notable entrants: (United States) Action Express Racing (United States) Wayne Taylor Racing (United States) Spirit of Daytona Racing (United States) JDC-Miller MotorSports (Argentina) Juncos Racing (United States) Chip Ganassi Racing
- Notable drivers: (Portugal) Filipe Albuquerque (Spain) Fernando Alonso (Italy) Max Angelelli (Portugal) João Barbosa (Australia) Ryan Briscoe (United States) Eric Curran (Brazil) Pipo Derani (New Zealand) Scott Dixon (Brazil) Christian Fittipaldi (United States) Jeff Gordon (Japan) Kamui Kobayashi (Brazil) Felipe Nasr (United States) Jordan Taylor (United States) Ricky Taylor (Netherlands) Renger van der Zande
- Debut: 2017 24 Hours of Daytona
- First win: 2017 24 Hours of Daytona
- Last win: 2022 Chevrolet Grand Prix
- Last event: 2022 Petit Le Mans
| Races | Wins | Podiums | Poles | F/Laps |
|---|---|---|---|---|
| 59 | 27 | 84 | 21 | 25 |
- Teams' Championships: 3 (2017 IMSA SCC, 2018 IMSA SCC, 2021 IMSA SCC)
- Constructors' Championships: 3 (2017 IMSA SCC, 2018 IMSA SCC, 2021 IMSA SCC)
- Drivers' Championships: 3 (2017 IMSA SCC, 2018 IMSA SCC, 2021 IMSA SCC)

The Cadillac DPi-V.R is a sports prototype racing car which started competing in the IMSA WeatherTech SportsCar Championship in North America in 2017. It is the manufacturer variation of Dallara P217 base, and replaces the Corvette DP. It marked Cadillac's return to sports car racing as a full constructor for the first time since the Cadillac Northstar LMP that competed in American Le Mans Series from 2000 to 2002. It was unveiled on November 30, 2016.

Across six seasons of competition, the DPi-V.R won the IMSA SportsCar Championship three times, doing so in 2017 with Wayne Taylor Racing, and in 2018 and 2021 with Action Express Racing. The DPi-V.R was one of the most successful DPi cars by the end of its time in competition, and it would be replaced by the Cadillac V-Series.R in 2023, following a change to the new Le Mans Hypercar and LMDh ruleset for sports prototypes.

== Background ==
A closed-top design, it incorporates several new mechanical and safety features not used in the previous Corvette DP car. Zylon anti-intrusion panels are built into the frame that prevent any mechanical components from coming into the chassis in the event of an accident. The Cadillac DPi-V.R has an electrical power steering system and an improved gearbox.

== Competition history ==
With the DPi regulations in place for the 2017 IMSA SportsCar Championship, the Cadillac DPi-V.R officially made its first start at the 2017 24 Hours of Daytona, where it also completed its first victory courtesy of Wayne Taylor Racing and drivers Jordan Taylor, Ricky Taylor, Max Angelelli, and Jeff Gordon. Cadillac proceeded to take victory in the next six races; four from Wayne Taylor Racing and one from each of the two entries from Action Express Racing. Cadillac completed a dominant season by taking home the Teams', Constructors', and Drivers' championships, with all three Cadillac entries occupying the top 3 of the standings. Wayne Taylor Racing, with the Taylor brothers, took home the Teams' and Drivers' titles for Cadillac.

Cadillac carried their momentum over to the 2018 IMSA SportsCar Championship, winning the season-opening 2018 24 Hours of Daytona with Mustang Sampling Racing and drivers Filipe Albuquerque, João Barbosa, and Christian Fittipaldi. Eric Curran and Felipe Nasr secured the championship with Whelen Engineering Racing, marking back-to-back titles for Cadillac. Across all three entries, the DPi-V.R secured a total of 11 podiums.

The next two seasons were less fruitful for Cadillac, as the rising levels of competition began to even out the field. The DPi-V.R finished runner-up twice in the 2019 IMSA SportsCar Championship and the 2020 IMSA SportsCar Championship, completing each season in 2nd overall behind Acura and Team Penske. Cadillac did continue to win the 24 Hours of Daytona, winning both the 2019 and 2020 editions, extending their record at Daytona to four consecutive wins, a streak that eventually ended in 2021, when then-recently departed Wayne Taylor Racing won the race with the Acura ARX-05 under five seconds ahead of the Ally Cadillac in 2nd.

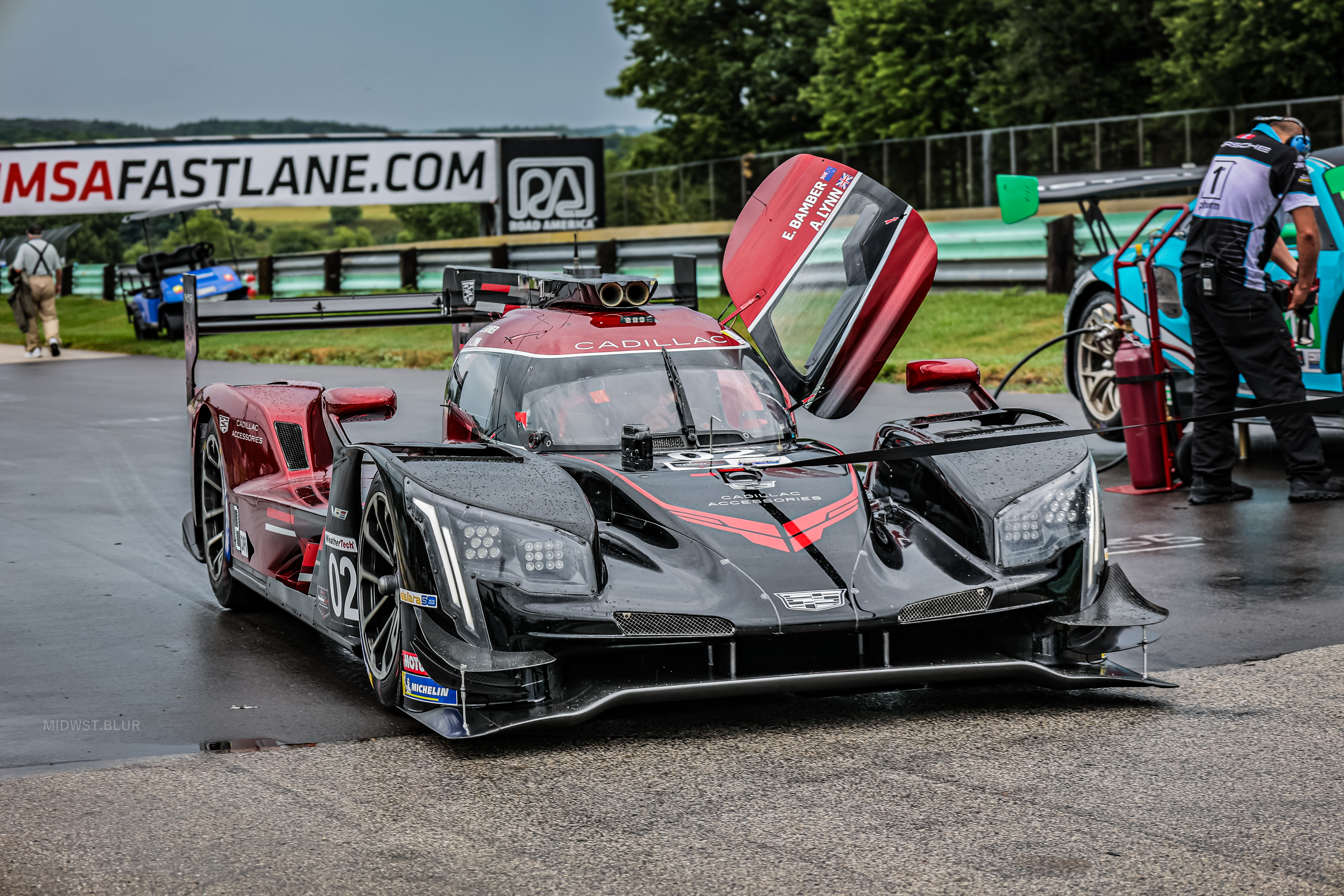
The No. 02 DPi-V.R of Cadillac Racing during the 2022 IMSA SportsCar Weekend

The DPi-V.R won the series title for a third and final time in the 2021 IMSA SportsCar Championship with Whelen Engineering Racing, the team experiencing a late season streak of podiums and victories in the second half of the season, from Watkins Glen to Road Atlanta, to take home the championships for Cadillac. In its final season in 2022, Chip Ganassi Racing were the highest-placed Cadillac in the standings, ending their season in 3rd.

== Complete IMSA SportsCar Championship results ==
Results in bold indicate pole position. Results in italics indicate fastest lap.

| Year | Entrant | Class | Drivers | No. | Rds. | Rounds | | | | | | | | | | | Points | Pos |
| Year | Entrant | Class | Drivers | No. | Rds. | 1 | 2 | 3 | 4 | 5 | 6 | 7 | 8 | 9 | 10 | 11 | Points | Pos |
|---|---|---|---|---|---|---|---|---|---|---|---|---|---|---|---|---|---|---|
| 2017 | (United States) Mustang Sampling Racing | Daytona Prototype International | (Portugal) João Barbosa (Brazil) Christian Fittipaldi (Portugal) Filipe Albuquerque | 5 | All; All; 1-2, 6, 10 | **DAY**; **2** | SEB; 2 | LBH; 7 | AUS; 3 | BEL; 4 | WGL; 1 | MOS; 6 | ELK; 6 | LGA; 5 | ATL; 5 | | **284** | **3rd** |
| 2017 | (United States) Whelen Engineering Racing | Daytona Prototype International | (United States) Dane Cameron (United States) Eric Curran (United Kingdom) Mike Conway (United Kingdom) Seb Morris (Portugal) Filipe Albuquerque | 31 | All; All; 1-2, 10; 1; 6 | DAY; 6 | SEB; 3 | LBH; 8 | AUS; 2 | BEL; 2 | WGL; 7 | MOS; 1 | ELK; 4 | LGA; 2 | ATL; 2 | | **291** | **2nd** |
| 2017 | (United States) Wayne Taylor Racing / Konica Minolta Cadillac DPi-V | Daytona Prototype International | (United States) Jordan Taylor (United States) Ricky Taylor (Italy) Max Angelelli (United States) Jeff Gordon (United Kingdom) Alex Lynn (United States) Ryan Hunter-Reay | 10 | All; All; 1; 1; 2; 10 | DAY; 1 | SEB; 1 | **LBH**; **1** | **AUS**; **1** | **BEL**; **1** | WGL; 6 | **MOS**; **7** | **ELK**; **2** | **LGA**; **3** | ATL; 9 | | **310** | **1st** |
| 2018 | (United States) Mustang Sampling Racing | Daytona Prototype International | (Portugal) Filipe Albuquerque (Portugal) João Barbosa (Brazil) Christian Fittipaldi (Colombia) Gabby Chaves (France) Tristan Vautier | 5 | All; 1-5, 8-9; 1-2, 6-7, 10; 6; 10 | DAY; 1 | SEB; 10 | LBH; 1 | MOH; 4 | BEL; 6 | WGL; 6 | MOS; 4 | ELK; 7 | LGA; DNS | ATL; 4 | | 249 | 6th |
| 2018 | (United States) Whelen Engineering Racing | Daytona Prototype International | (United States) Eric Curran (Brazil) Felipe Nasr (United Kingdom) Mike Conway (United Kingdom) Stuart Middleton (Colombia) Gabby Chaves | 31 | All; All; 1-2, 6; 1; 10 | DAY; 2 | SEB; 3 | LBH; 7 | MOH; 8 | BEL; 1 | WGL; 7 | MOS; 3 | ELK; 3 | LGA; 5 | ATL; 8 | | **277** | **1st** |
| 2018 | (United States) Wayne Taylor Racing / Konica Minolta Cadillac DPi-V | Daytona Prototype International | (United States) Jordan Taylor (Netherlands) Renger van der Zande (United States) Ryan Hunter-Reay (Netherlands) Renger van der Zande | 10 | All; All; 1-2, 10 | **DAY**; **15** | SEB; 2 | LBH; 3 | MOH; 5 | BEL; 5 | WGL; 5 | MOS; 2 | ELK; 4 | **LGA**; **12** | ATL; 1 | | **270** | **3rd** |
| 2018 | (United States) Spirit of Daytona Racing | Daytona Prototype International | (United States) Matt McMurry (France) Tristan Vautier (Italy) Eddie Cheever III | 90 | 1-2, 5-6; 1-2, 5-6; 1-2 | DAY; 20 | **SEB**; **12** | LBH | MOH | BEL; 13 | WGL; 11 | MOS | ELK | LGA | ATL | | 68 | 16th |
| 2019 | (United States) Mustang Sampling Racing | Daytona Prototype International | (Portugal) Filipe Albuquerque (Portugal) João Barbosa (Brazil) Christian Fittipaldi (New Zealand) Brendon Hartley (United Kingdom) Mike Conway | 5 | All; All; 1; 2; 6, 10 | DAY; 7 | SEB; 3 | LBH; 1 | MOH; 8 | BEL; 6 | WGL; 6 | MOS; 10 | ELK; 6 | LGA; 5 | ATL; 7 | | 258 | 7th |
| 2019 | (United States) Whelen Engineering Racing | Daytona Prototype International | (Brazil) Pipo Derani (Brazil) Felipe Nasr (United States) Eric Curran | 31 | All; All; 1-2, 6, 10 | DAY; 2 | SEB; 1 | LBH; 6 | MOH; 4 | BEL; 2 | WGL; 7 | MOS; 4 | ELK; 4 | LGA; 3 | **ATL**; **1** | | **297** | **2nd** |
| 2019 | (United States) Konica Minolta Cadillac | Daytona Prototype International | (United States) Jordan Taylor (Netherlands) Renger van der Zande (Spain) Fernando Alonso (Japan) Kamui Kobayashi (France) Matthieu Vaxivière | 10 | All; All; 1; 1; 2, 10 | DAY; 1 | SEB; 2 | LBH; 10 | MOH; 6 | BEL; 9 | WGL; 4 | MOS; 6 | ELK; 5 | LGA; 4 | ATL; 2 | | 274 | 4th |
| 2019 | (Argentina) Juncos Racing | Daytona Prototype International | (United States) Will Owen (Austria) René Binder (Argentina) Agustín Canapino (United States) Kyle Kaiser (Brazil) Victor Franzoni (United States) Spencer Pigot | 50 | 1-7, 10; 1-2, 6, 10; 1-2; 1, 3-4; 5, 7; 10 | DAY; 8 | SEB; 10 | LBH; 7 | MOH; 9 | BEL; 8 | WGL; 8 | MOS; 11 | ELK | LGA | ATL; 10 | | 177 | 11th |
| 2019 | (United States) JDC-Miller MotorSports | Daytona Prototype International | (South Africa) Stephen Simpson (Switzerland) Simon Trummer (United States) Chris Miller (Colombia) Juan Piedrahita | 84 | All; All; 1-2, 6, 10; 1 | DAY; 10 | SEB; 8 | LBH; 5 | MOH; 7 | BEL; 4 | WGL; 9 | MOS; 8 | ELK; 9 | LGA; 9 | ATL; 5 | | 237 | 8th |
| 2019 | (United States) JDC-Miller MotorSports | Daytona Prototype International | (Canada) Mikhail Goikhberg (France) Tristan Vautier (Brazil) Rubens Barrichello (Canada) Devlin DeFrancesco (Colombia) Juan Piedrahita | 85 | All; All; 1; 1; 2, 6, 10 | DAY; 5 | SEB; 7 | LBH; 9 | MOH; 10 | BEL; 5 | WGL; 10 | MOS; 9 | ELK; 8 | LGA; 8 | ATL; 9 | | 230 | 10th |
| 2020 | (United States) Mustang Sampling Racing / JDC-Miller MotorSports | Daytona Prototype International | (France) Sébastien Bourdais (Portugal) João Barbosa (France) Loïc Duval (France) Tristan Vautier | 5 | All; 1-6; 1, 7, 9; 5, 7-9 | DAY1; 3 | DAY2; 3 | SEB1; 3 | ELK; 4 | ATL1; 4 | MOH; 6 | ATL2; 4 | LGA; 7 | SEB2; 5 | | | 249 | 5th |
| 2020 | (United States) JDC-Miller MotorSports | Daytona Prototype International | (France) Tristan Vautier (United States) Chris Miller (Brazil) Matheus Leist (Colombia) Juan Piedrahita (South Africa) Stephen Simpson (France) Gabriel Aubry (Australia) Scott Andrews | 85 | 1-4, 6; 1-2, 4, 7; 1, 4, 7-9; 1; 3, 5, 8-9; 6-7; 9 | DAY1; 5 | DAY2; 7 | SEB1; 8 | ELK; 7 | ATL1; 8 | MOH; 8 | ATL2; 8 | LGA; 8 | SEB2; 4 | | | 217 | 8th |
| 2020 | (United States) Konica Minolta Cadillac DPi-V.R | Daytona Prototype International | (Netherlands) Renger van der Zande (Australia) Ryan Briscoe (New Zealand) Scott Dixon (Japan) Kamui Kobayashi | 10 | All; All; 1, 7, 9; 1 | DAY1; 1 | DAY2; 6 | SEB1; 2 | ELK; 2 | ATL1; 5 | MOH; 3 | ATL2; 1 | LGA; 6 | SEB2; 7 | | | **264** | **2nd** |
| 2020 | (United States) Whelen Engineering Racing | Daytona Prototype International | (Brazil) Pipo Derani (Brazil) Felipe Nasr (Portugal) Filipe Albuquerque (United Kingdom) Mike Conway (Colombia) Gabby Chaves | 31 | All; 1, 3-9; 1, 5, 7; 1; 2, 9 | DAY1; 7 | DAY2; 5 | **SEB1**; **1** | ELK; 3 | ATL1; 3 | MOH; 2 | ATL2; 5 | LGA; 3 | SEB2; 6 | | | 258 | 4th |
| 2021 | (United States) Cadillac Chip Ganassi Racing | Daytona Prototype International | (Netherlands) Renger van der Zande (Denmark) Kevin Magnussen (New Zealand) Scott Dixon (New Zealand) Earl Bamber | 01 | All; 1-10; 1-3, 11; 11 | DAY1; 7 | DAY2; 5 | SEB; 5 | MOH; 5 | **BEL**; **1** | WGL1; 6 | WGL2; 2 | ELK; 3 | LGA; 2 | LBH; 2 | ATL; 5 | 3163 | 4th |
| 2021 | (United States) JDC-Mustang Sampling Racing | Daytona Prototype International | (France) Loïc Duval (France) Tristan Vautier (France) Sébastien Bourdais | 5 | All; All; 1-3, 6, 11 | DAY1; 3 | DAY2; 7 | SEB; 1 | MOH; 4 | BEL; 5 | WGL1; 7 | WGL2; 4 | ELK; 6 | LGA; 6 | LBH; 3 | ATL; 7 | 2933 | 6th |
| 2021 | (United States) Whelen Engineering Racing | Daytona Prototype International | (Brazil) Pipo Derani (Brazil) Felipe Nasr (United Kingdom) Mike Conway (United States) Chase Elliott | 31 | All; All; 1-3, 6, 11; 1-2 | **DAY1**; **1** | DAY2; 6 | **SEB**; **6** | MOH; 2 | BEL; 2 | WGL1; 4 | WGL2; 1 | **ELK**; **1** | LGA; 3 | **LBH**; **1** | **ATL**; **2** | **3407** | **1st** |
| 2021 | (United States) Ally Cadillac Racing | Daytona Prototype International | (United States) Jimmie Johnson (Japan) Kamui Kobayashi (France) Simon Pagenaud (Germany) Mike Rockenfeller | 48 | 1-3, 6, 11; 1-3, 6, 11; 1-3, 6, 11; 1-2 | DAY1; 6 | DAY2; 2 | SEB; 7 | MOH | BEL | WGL1; 5 | WGL2 | ELK | LGA | LBH | ATL; 4 | 1203 | 7th |
| 2022 | (United States) Cadillac Racing | Daytona Prototype International | (France) Sébastien Bourdais (Netherlands) Renger van der Zande (Spain) Álex Palou (New Zealand) Scott Dixon (United States) Ryan Hunter-Reay | 01 | All; All; 1-2; 1-2, 11; 3 | DAY1; 5 | DAY2; 7 | **SEB**; **7** | **LBH**; **1** | LGA; 6 | **MOH**; **5** | **BEL**; **1** | WGL; 3 | MOS; 1 | ELK; 3 | ATL; 4 | **3220** | **3rd** |
| 2022 | (United States) Cadillac Racing | Daytona Prototype International | (United Kingdom) Alex Lynn (New Zealand) Earl Bamber (United States) Ryan Hunter-Reay (Denmark) Kevin Magnussen (Sweden) Marcus Ericsson (Switzerland) Neel Jani | 02 | All; All; 11; 1-2; 1-2; 3 | DAY1; 6 | DAY2; 6 | SEB; 1 | LBH; 2 | LGA; 5 | MOH; 4 | BEL; 3 | WGL; 4 | MOS; 4 | ELK; 2 | ATL; 5 | 3191 | 4th |
| 2022 | (United States) JDC-Miller Motorsports | Daytona Prototype International | (France) Tristan Vautier (United Kingdom) Richard Westbrook (France) Loïc Duval (United States) Ben Keating | 5 | All; All; 1-3, 8, 11; 1-2 | DAY1; 2 | DAY2; 3 | SEB; 2 | LBH; 3 | LGA; 4 | MOH; 6 | BEL; 5 | WGL; 7 | MOS; 5 | ELK; 5 | ATL; 7 | 2979 | 6th |
| 2022 | (United States) Whelen Engineering Racing | Daytona Prototype International | (Brazil) Pipo Derani (United States) Tristan Nunez (United Kingdom); Mike Conway (France) Olivier Pla | 31 | All; 1-6; 1-3, 8, 11; 7-11 | DAY1; 7 | DAY2; 4 | SEB; 3 | LBH; 5 | LGA; 3 | MOH; 3 | BEL; 6 | WGL; 5 | MOS; 3 | ELK; 6 | ATL; 2 | 3083 | 5th |
| 2022 | (United States) Ally Cadillac Racing | Daytona Prototype International | (Japan) Kamui Kobayashi (Germany) Mike Rockenfeller (Argentina) José María López (United States) Jimmie Johnson | 48 | 1-3, 8, 11; 1-3, 8, 11; 1-3; 1-2, 8, 11 | DAY1; 3 | DAY2; 5 | SEB; 6 | | | | | WGL; 6 | | | ATL; 3 | 1165 | 7th |
