= 2019 Chevrolet Sports Car Classic =

Fifth round of the 2019 IMSA SportsCar Championship season

The Raceway on Belle Isle

The 2019 Chevrolet Sports Car Classic was a sports car race sanctioned by the International Motor Sports Association (IMSA). The race was held at The Raceway on Belle Isle in Detroit, Michigan, on June 1, 2019. This race was the fifth round of the 2019 WeatherTech SportsCar Championship, and the second round of the 2019 WeatherTech Sprint Cup.

== Background ==
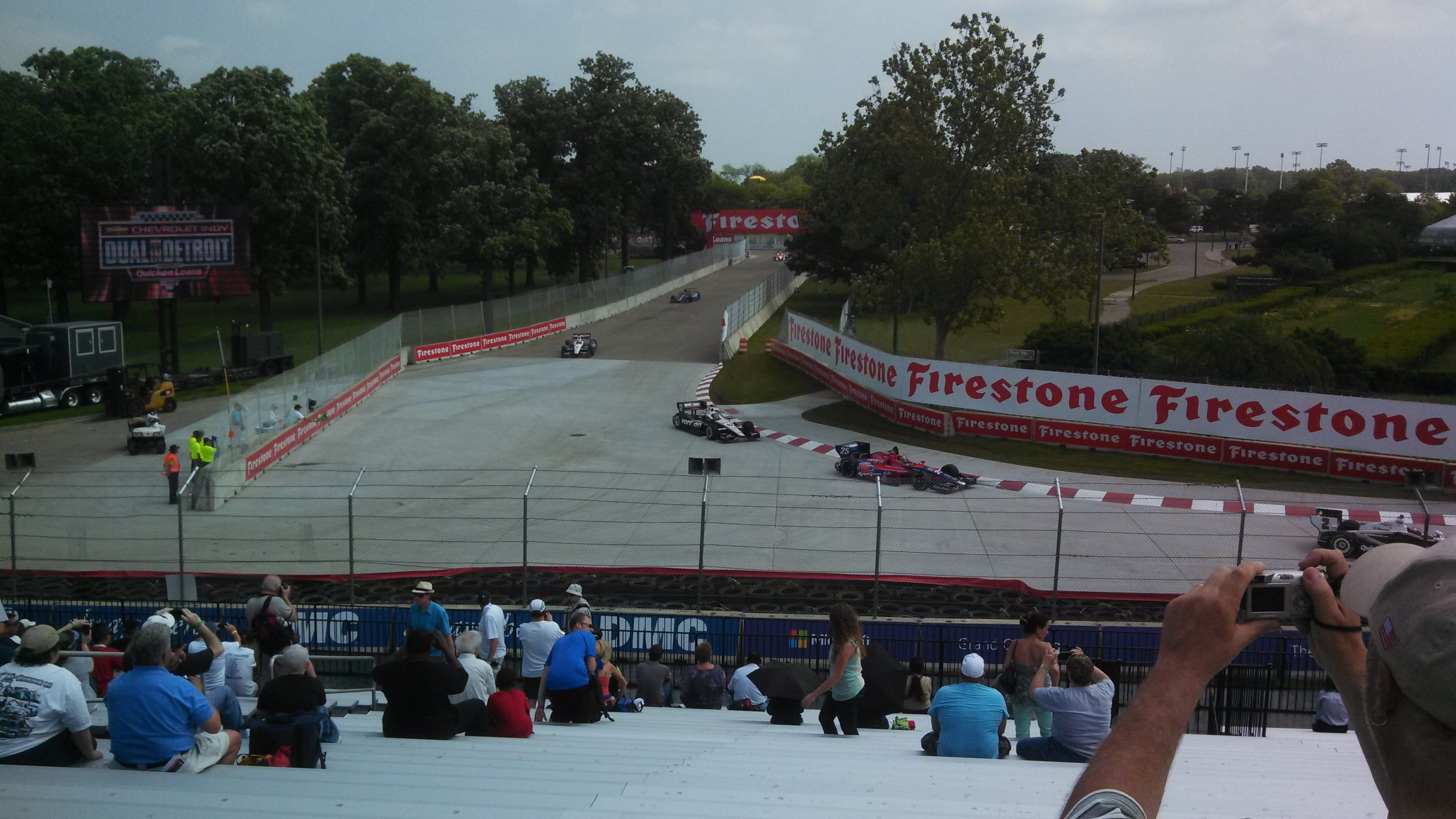
The Raceway on Belle Isle, where the race was held.

International Motor Sports Association's (IMSA) president Scott Atherton confirmed the race was part of the schedule for the 2019 IMSA SportsCar Championship (IMSA SCC) in August 2018. It was the sixth consecutive year the event was held as part of the WeatherTech SportsCar Championship, and the tenth annual running of the race, counting the period between 2007 and 2013 when it was a round of the Rolex Sports Car Series and the American Le Mans Series respectively. The 2019 Chevrolet Sports Car Classic was the fifth of twelve sports car races of 2019 by IMSA, the shortest in terms of time, and it was the second of seven rounds held as part of the WeatherTech Sprint Cup. The race was held at the fourteen-turn 2.350 mi (3.782 km) Belle Isle Park in Detroit, Michigan on June 1, 2019.

Similar to the Grand Prix of Long Beach, this event ran in conjunction with the Detroit Grand Prix in the IndyCar Series, with one event held on the same day as the IMSA event, and another held a day after as a double-header.

Before the race, Pipo Derani and Felipe Nasr led the DPi Drivers' Championship with 120 points, ahead of Hélio Castroneves and Ricky Taylor in second followed by Jordan Taylor and Renger van der Zande with 113 points in third. In GTD, Mario Farnbacher and Trent Hindman led the Drivers' Championship with 84 points, 4 points ahead of Frankie Montecalvo and Townsend Bell. Cadillac and Lamborghini were leading their respective Manufacturers' Championships, while Whelen Engineering Racing and Meyer Shank Racing each led their own Teams' Championships. The event did not count towards the overall in GTD as it only contented towards the WeatherTech Sprint Cup, in an attempt to cut costs for the class.

=== Entries ===
On May 22, 2019, the entry list for the event was released, featuring 23 cars in total. There were 11 cars in the Daytona Prototype International class and 12 entries in the GTD class. The Le Mans Prototype (LMP2) and GT Le Mans (GTLM) classes would not be participating in the event. Due to only counting towards the WeatherTech Sprint Cup, full-season GTD entries Riley Motorsports, Pfaff Motorsports, and Moorespeed decided to forego the Detroit event in favor of pursuing the full-season championship. Meyer-Shank Racing were initially among the teams that decided to miss the Detroit event, until confirming at the eleventh hour a full-time program in both the full-time and sprint championships with both of their cars.

Pfaff Motorsports driver Zach Robichon, who was initially due to miss the event, filled a vacant spot at Park Place Motorsports, replacing Patrick Lindsey, who was preparing for the official test sessions for the 2019 24 Hours of Le Mans.

== Practice ==
There were two practice sessions preceding the start of the race on Sunday, one on Friday morning and one on Friday afternoon. The session on Friday morning lasted 90 minutes while the second session on Friday afternoon lasted 110 minutes.

=== Practice 1 ===
The first practice session took place at 8:30 am ET on Friday and ended with Pipo Derani topping the charts for Whelen Engineering Racing, with a lap time of 1:20.583. Hélio Castroneves was second fastest in the No. 7 Acura followed by Filipe Albuquerque in the No. 5 Mustang Sampling Racing Cadillac. The GTD class was topped by the No. 57 Heinricher Racing w/Meyer Shank Racing Acura NSX GT3 Evo of Katherine Legge with a time of 1:30.304, ahead of Bryan Sellers in the No. 48 Paul Miller Racing Lamborghini. Zacharie Robichon was third fastest in the No. 73 Porsche followed by Richard Heistand in the No. 14 Lexus in fourth position. The Mazda Team Joest entries did not set a time due to mechanical issues. The session was red flagged two times. Simon Trummer crashed the No. 84 JDC-Miller Motorsports Cadillac and brought out the first red flag. The final stoppage came when Misha Goikhberg crashed the No. 85 JDC-Miller Motorsports Cadillac at turn 2 and collided with Matt Plumb's McLaren. The No. 85 Cadillac suffered extensive damage while the No. 76 McLaren lost a door.

Pos.	Class	No.	Team	Driver	Time	Gap
1	DPi	31	Whelen Engineering Racing	Pipo Derani	1:20.583	_
2	DPi	7	Acura Team Penske	Hélio Castroneves	1:20.835	+0.252
3	DPi	5	Mustang Sampling Racing	Filipe Albuquerque	1:21.446	+0.863

=== Practice 2 ===
The second and final practice session took place at 12:50 PM ET on Friday and ended with Pipo Derani topping the charts for Whelen Engineering Racing, with a lap time of 1:20.387. Jordan Taylor was second fastest in the No. 10 Konica Minolta Cadillac entry followed by Hélio Castroneves in the No. 7 Acura. The GTD class was topped by the No. 73 Park Place Motorsports Porsche 911 GT3 R of Zacharie Robichon with a time of 1:30.011, ahead of Christina Nielsen in the No. 57 Acura. Bill Auberlen was third fastest in the No. 96 BMW followed by Mario Farnbacher in the No. 86 Acura in fourth and Jack Hawksworth's No. 14 Lexus rounded out the top five. The Compass Racing did not set a time.

Pos.	Class	No.	Team	Driver	Time	Gap
1	DPi	31	Whelen Engineering Racing	Pipo Derani	1:20.387	_
2	DPi	10	Konica Minolta Cadillac	Jordan Taylor	1:20.506	+0.119
3	DPi	7	Acura Team Penske	Hélio Castroneves	1:20.610	+0.223

== Qualifying ==
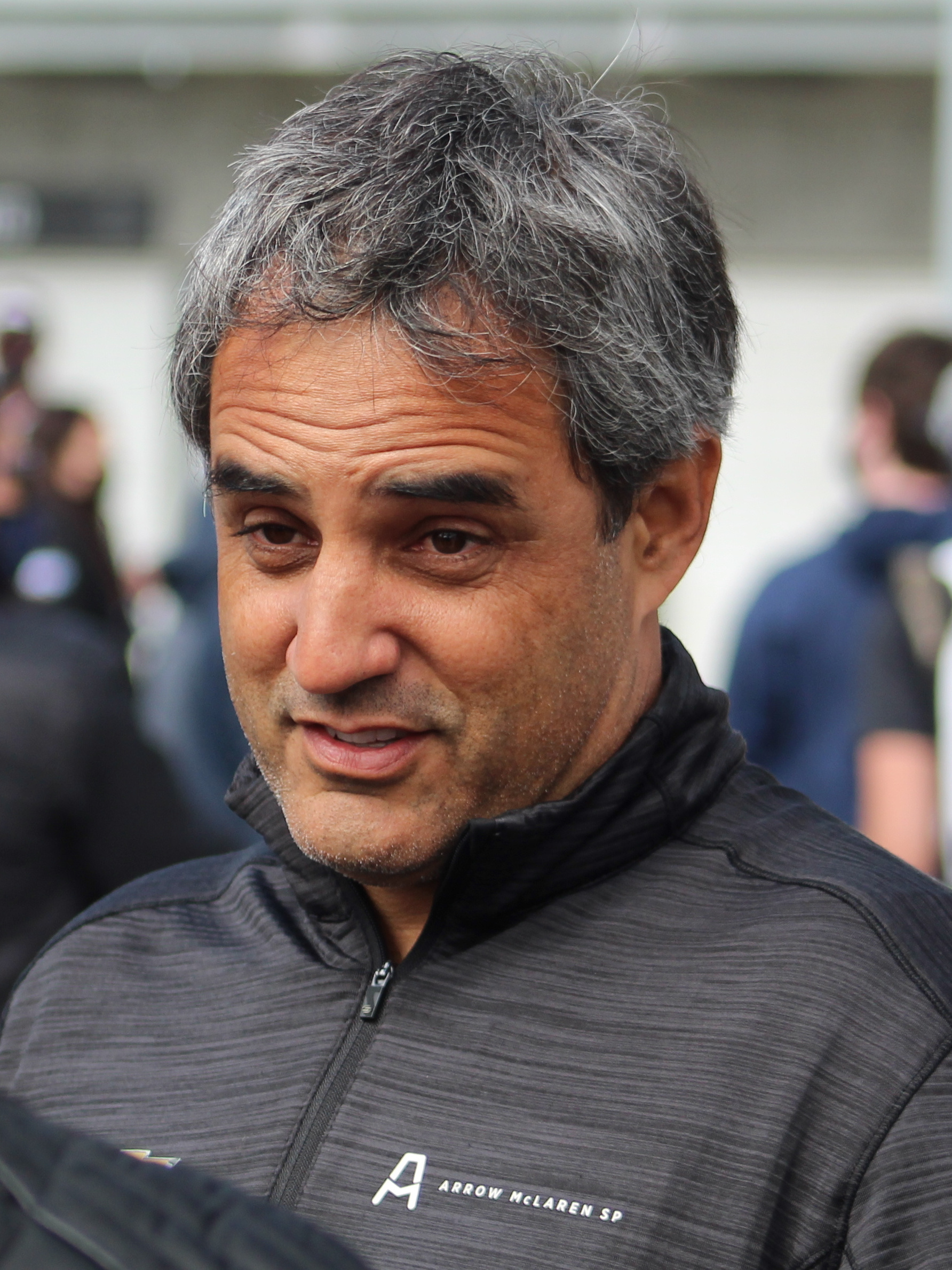
Juan Pablo Montoya (pictured in 2021) took the overall pole position for Acura Team Penske.

Friday's late afternoon qualification session was broken into two sessions that lasted 15 minutes each. Cars in GTD were sent out first and, after a ten-minute interval, DPi vehicles drove onto the track. All cars were required to be driven by one participant and the starting order was determined by the competitor's fastest lap. IMSA then arranged the grid so that the DPi field started in front of all GTD cars.

The first was for cars in the GTD class. Robby Foley set the fastest time driving the No. 96 car for Turner Motorsport. However, the team were sent to the back of the GTD grid after the car failed post-qualifying technical inspection where it was discovered that the BMW was found to not have complied with mandated camber range settings. As a result, Zacharie Robichon's No. 73 Park Place Motorsports Porsche was promoted to pole position. Christina Nielsen in the No. 57 Acura started in second position followed by Trent Hindman's No. 86 Acura. The No. 8 Starworks Motorsport Audi of Parker Chase did not set a time due to suspension problems.

The final session of qualifying was for cars in the DPi class. Juan Pablo Montoya qualified on pole driving the No. 6 car for Acura Team Penske, beating teammate Hélio Castroneves in the No. 7 Acura by 0.207 seconds. Jonathan Bomarito qualified the No. 55 Mazda Team Joest entry in third position followed by Pipo Derani's No. 31 Whelen Engineering Racing Cadillac. João Barbosa in the No. 5 Mustang Sampling Racing Cadillac started from fifth place. Following in sixth was the No. 10 Konica Minolta Cadillac Cadillac DPi-V.R of Renger van der Zande followed by Tristan Nunez's No. 77 Mazda in seventh place. The duo of JDC-Miller Motorsports Cadillacs were eighth and tenth: Simon Trummer in the No. 84 car was faster than the sister No. 85 entry of Misha Goikhberg. They were separated by the ninth-placed Victor Franzoni in the No. 50 Juncos Racing Cadillac DPi-V.R.

=== Qualifying Results ===
Pole positions in each class are indicated in bold and by ‡.

Pos.	Class	No.	Team	Driver	Time	Gap	Grid
1	**DPi**	**6**	**(United States) Acura Team Penske**	**(Colombia) Juan Pablo Montoya**	**1:19.373**	**_**	1‡
2	DPi	7	(United States) Acura Team Penske	(Brazil) Hélio Castroneves	1:19.580	+0.207	2
3	DPi	55	(Germany) Mazda Team Joest	(United States) Jonathan Bomarito	1:19.960	+0.587	3
4	DPi	31	(United States) Whelen Engineering Racing	(Brazil) Pipo Derani	1:19.991	+0.618	4
5	DPi	5	(United States) Mustang Sampling Racing	(Portugal) João Barbosa	1:20.239	+0.866	5
6	DPi	10	(United States) Konica Minolta Cadillac	(Netherlands) Renger van der Zande	1:20.448	+1.075	6
7	DPi	77	(Germany) Mazda Team Joest	(United States) Tristan Nunez	1:20.508	+1.135	7
8	DPi	84	(United States) JDC-Miller Motorsports	(Switzerland) Simon Trummer	1:20.663	+1.290	8
9	DPi	50	(Argentina) Juncos Racing	(Brazil) Victor Franzoni	1:21.075	+1.702	9
10	DPi	85	(United States) JDC-Miller Motorsports	(Canada) Misha Goikhberg	1:23.313	+3.940	10
11	DPi	54	(United States) CORE Autosport	(United States) Jon Bennett	1:24.631	+5.258	11
12	GTD	96	(United States) Turner Motorsport	(United States) Robby Foley	1:29.704	+10.331	23^{1}
13	**GTD**	**73**	**(United States) Park Place Motorsports**	**(Canada) Zacharie Robichon**	**1:29.735**	**+10.362**	12‡
14	GTD	57	(United States) Heinricher Racing w/Meyer Shank Racing	(Denmark) Christina Nielsen	1:30.126	+10.753	13
15	GTD	86	(United States) Meyer Shank Racing with Curb-Agajanian	(United States) Trent Hindman	1:30.242	+10.869	14
16	GTD	14	(Canada) AIM Vasser Sullivan	(United States) Richard Heistand	1:30.453	+11.080	15
17	GTD	12	(Canada) AIM Vasser Sullivan	(United States) Frankie Montecalvo	1:30.505	+11.132	16
18	GTD	48	(United States) Paul Miller Racing	(United States) Ryan Hardwick	1:30.763	+11.390	17
19	GTD	76	(Canada) Compass Racing	(United States) Matt Plumb	1:30.814	+11.441	18
20	GTD	44	(United States) Magnus Racing	(United States) John Potter	1:30.926	+11.553	19
21	GTD	63	(United States) Scuderia Corsa	(United States) Cooper MacNeil	1:31.953	+12.580	20
21	GTD	74	(United States) Lone Star Racing	(United States) Gar Robinson	1:31.970	+12.597	21
22	GTD	8	(United States) Starworks Motorsport	None	None	N/A	22
Sources:

- ^{1} The No. 96 Turner Motorsport entry initially qualified on pole position for the GTD class. However, the car was found to not have complied with mandated camber range settings. By IMSA rules, the entry was moved to the rear of the GTD field on the starting grid.

== Race ==
=== Post-race ===
With a total of 152 points, Derani and Nasr's second place finish kept them atop DPi Drivers' Championship while Cameron and Montoya's victory allowed them to advance from fourth to second. Jordan Taylor and Renger van der Zande dropped from third to fifth. GTD drivers, teams, and manufactures did not score full season points due to the event only counting towards the WeatherTech Sprint Cup. Cadillac continued to top the DPi Manufactures' Championship while Whelen Engineering Racing continued to top the DPi Teams' Championship with seven rounds left in the season.

=== Race results ===
Class winners are denoted in bold and ‡.

Pos	Class	No.	Team	Drivers	Chassis	Laps	Time/Retired
Pos	Class	No.	Team	Drivers	Engine	Laps	Time/Retired
1	**DPi**	**6**	**(United States) Acura Team Penske**	**(United States) Dane Cameron (Colombia) Juan Pablo Montoya**	**Acura ARX-05**	**58**	**1:40:15.563‡**
1	**DPi**	**6**	**(United States) Acura Team Penske**	**(United States) Dane Cameron (Colombia) Juan Pablo Montoya**	**Acura AR35TT 3.5 L Turbo V6**	**58**	**1:40:15.563‡**
2	DPi	31	(United States) Whelen Engineering Racing	(Brazil) Pipo Derani (Brazil) Felipe Nasr	Cadillac DPi-V.R	58	+0.820s
2	DPi	31	(United States) Whelen Engineering Racing	(Brazil) Pipo Derani (Brazil) Felipe Nasr	Cadillac 5.5 L V8	58	+0.820s
3	DPi	7	(United States) Acura Team Penske	(Brazil) Hélio Castroneves (United States) Ricky Taylor	Acura ARX-05	58	+14.887s
3	DPi	7	(United States) Acura Team Penske	(Brazil) Hélio Castroneves (United States) Ricky Taylor	Acura AR35TT 3.5 L Turbo V6	58	+14.887s
4	DPi	84	(United States) JDC-Miller Motorsports	(South Africa) Stephen Simpson (Switzerland) Simon Trummer	Cadillac DPi-V.R	58	+15.050s
4	DPi	84	(United States) JDC-Miller Motorsports	(South Africa) Stephen Simpson (Switzerland) Simon Trummer	Cadillac 5.5 L V8	58	+15.050s
5	DPi	85	(United States) JDC-Miller Motorsports	(Canada) Misha Goikhberg (France) Tristan Vautier	Cadillac DPi-V.R	58	+16.205s
5	DPi	85	(United States) JDC-Miller Motorsports	(Canada) Misha Goikhberg (France) Tristan Vautier	Cadillac 5.5 L V8	58	+16.205s
6	DPi	5	(United States) Mustang Sampling Racing	(Portugal) Filipe Albuquerque (Portugal) João Barbosa	Cadillac DPi-V.R	58	+22.583s
6	DPi	5	(United States) Mustang Sampling Racing	(Portugal) Filipe Albuquerque (Portugal) João Barbosa	Cadillac 5.5 L V8	58	+22.583s
7	DPi	54	(United States) CORE Autosport	(United States) Jon Bennett (United States) Colin Braun	Nissan DPi	58	+26.978s
7	DPi	54	(United States) CORE Autosport	(United States) Jon Bennett (United States) Colin Braun	Nissan VR38DETT 3.8 L Turbo V6	58	+26.978s
8	DPi	50	(Argentina) Juncos Racing	(Brazil) Victor Franzoni (United States) Will Owen	Cadillac DPi-V.R	58	+27.390s
8	DPi	50	(Argentina) Juncos Racing	(Brazil) Victor Franzoni (United States) Will Owen	Cadillac 5.5 L V8	58	+27.390s
9	DPi	10	(United States) Konica Minolta Cadillac	(United States) Jordan Taylor (Netherlands) Renger van der Zande	Cadillac DPi-V.R	57	+1 lap
9	DPi	10	(United States) Konica Minolta Cadillac	(United States) Jordan Taylor (Netherlands) Renger van der Zande	Cadillac 5.5 L V8	57	+1 lap
10	DPi	77	(Germany) Mazda Team Joest	(United Kingdom) Oliver Jarvis (United States) Tristan Nunez	Mazda RT24-P	57	+1 lap
10	DPi	77	(Germany) Mazda Team Joest	(United Kingdom) Oliver Jarvis (United States) Tristan Nunez	Mazda MZ-2.0T 2.0 L Turbo I4	57	+1 lap
11	**GTD**	**14**	**(Canada) AIM Vasser Sullivan**	**(United Kingdom) Jack Hawksworth (United States) Richard Heistand**	**Lexus RC F GT3**	**56**	**+2 laps‡**
11	**GTD**	**14**	**(Canada) AIM Vasser Sullivan**	**(United Kingdom) Jack Hawksworth (United States) Richard Heistand**	**Lexus 5.0 L V8**	**56**	**+2 laps‡**
12	GTD	73	(United States) Park Place Motorsports	(United States) Patrick Long (Canada) Zacharie Robichon	Porsche 911 GT3 R	56	+2 laps
12	GTD	73	(United States) Park Place Motorsports	(United States) Patrick Long (Canada) Zacharie Robichon	Porsche 4.0 L Flat-6	56	+2 laps
13	GTD	12	(Canada) AIM Vasser Sullivan	(United States) Townsend Bell (United States) Frankie Montecalvo	Lexus RC F GT3	56	+2 laps
13	GTD	12	(Canada) AIM Vasser Sullivan	(United States) Townsend Bell (United States) Frankie Montecalvo	Lexus 5.0 L V8	56	+2 laps
14	GTD	44	(United States) Magnus Racing	(United States) Andy Lally (United States) John Potter	Lamborghini Huracán GT3 Evo	56	+2 laps
14	GTD	44	(United States) Magnus Racing	(United States) Andy Lally (United States) John Potter	Lamborghini 5.2 L V10	56	+2 laps
15	GTD	48	(United States) Paul Miller Racing	(United States) Ryan Hardwick (United States) Bryan Sellers	Lamborghini Huracán GT3 Evo	56	+2 laps
15	GTD	48	(United States) Paul Miller Racing	(United States) Ryan Hardwick (United States) Bryan Sellers	Lamborghini 5.2 L V10	56	+2 laps
16	GTD	8	(United States) Starworks Motorsport	(United States) Parker Chase (United Kingdom) Ryan Dalziel	Audi R8 LMS Evo	56	+2 laps
16	GTD	8	(United States) Starworks Motorsport	(United States) Parker Chase (United Kingdom) Ryan Dalziel	Audi 5.2 L V10	56	+2 laps
17	GTD	74	(United States) Lone Star Racing	(United States) Lawson Aschenbach (United States) Gar Robinson	Mercedes-AMG GT3	56	+2 laps
17	GTD	74	(United States) Lone Star Racing	(United States) Lawson Aschenbach (United States) Gar Robinson	Mercedes-AMG M159 6.2 L V8	56	+2 laps
18	GTD	76	(Canada) Compass Racing	(United States) Paul Holton (United States) Matt Plumb	McLaren 720S GT3	56	+2 laps
18	GTD	76	(Canada) Compass Racing	(United States) Paul Holton (United States) Matt Plumb	McLaren M480T 4.0 L Twin-turbo V8	56	+2 laps
19	GTD	57	(United States) Heinricher Racing w/Meyer Shank Racing	(United Kingdom) Katherine Legge (Denmark) Christina Nielsen	Acura NSX GT3 Evo	56	+2 laps
19	GTD	57	(United States) Heinricher Racing w/Meyer Shank Racing	(United Kingdom) Katherine Legge (Denmark) Christina Nielsen	Acura 3.5 L Turbo V6	56	+2 laps
20 DNF	GTD	96	(United States) Turner Motorsport	(United States) Bill Auberlen (United States) Robby Foley	BMW M6 GT3	53	Transmission
20 DNF	GTD	96	(United States) Turner Motorsport	(United States) Bill Auberlen (United States) Robby Foley	BMW 4.4 L Turbo V8	53	Transmission
21 DNF	DPi	55	(Germany) Mazda Team Joest	(United States) Jonathan Bomarito (United States) Ryan Hunter-Reay	Mazda RT24-P	39	Crash
21 DNF	DPi	55	(Germany) Mazda Team Joest	(United States) Jonathan Bomarito (United States) Ryan Hunter-Reay	Mazda MZ-2.0T 2.0 L Turbo I4	39	Crash
22 DNF	GTD	86	(United States) Meyer Shank Racing with Curb-Agajanian	(Germany) Mario Farnbacher (United States) Trent Hindman	Acura NSX GT3 Evo	20	Crash
22 DNF	GTD	86	(United States) Meyer Shank Racing with Curb-Agajanian	(Germany) Mario Farnbacher (United States) Trent Hindman	Acura 3.5 L Turbo V6	20	Crash
23 DNF	GTD	63	(United States) Scuderia Corsa	(United States) Cooper MacNeil (Finland) Toni Vilander	Ferrari 488 GT3	0	Crash
23 DNF	GTD	63	(United States) Scuderia Corsa	(United States) Cooper MacNeil (Finland) Toni Vilander	Ferrari F154 3.9 L Turbo V8	0	Crash

== Standings after the race ==
DPi Drivers' Championship standings
Pos.	+/–	Driver	Points
1		(Brazil) Pipo Derani (Brazil) Felipe Nasr	152
2	2	(United States) Dane Cameron (Colombia) Juan Pablo Montoya	147
3	1	(Brazil) Hélio Castroneves (United States) Ricky Taylor	146
4	1	(Portugal) Filipe Albuquerque (Portugal) João Barbosa	137
5	2	(United States) Jordan Taylor (Netherlands) Renger van der Zande	135

LMP2 Drivers' Championship standings
Pos.	+/–	Driver	Points
1		(Canada) Cameron Cassels (United States) Kyle Masson	99
2		(United States) Matt McMurry	95
3		(France) Gabriel Aubry	60
4		(Colombia) Sebastián Saavedra (Venezuela) Pastor Maldonado (Republic of Ireland) Ryan Cullen (Mexico) Roberto González	35
5		(United States) Andrew Evans	35

GTLM Drivers' Championship standings
Pos.	+/–	Driver	Points
1		(New Zealand) Earl Bamber (Belgium) Laurens Vanthoor	126
2		(Spain) Antonio García (Denmark) Jan Magnussen	119
3		(France) Patrick Pilet (United Kingdom) Nick Tandy	117
4		(United States) Connor De Phillippi	111
5		(Germany) Dirk Müller (France) Sebastien Bourdais	108

GTD Drivers' Championship standings
Pos.	+/–	Driver	Points
1		(Germany) Mario Farnbacher (United States) Trent Hindman	84‡
2		(United States) Frankie Montecalvo (United States) Townsend Bell	80‡
3		(United States) Richard Heistand (United Kingdom) Jack Hawksworth	77‡
4		(United States) Patrick Long	77‡
5		(United States) Andy Lally (United States) John Potter	76‡

- Note: Only the top five positions are included for all sets of standings.
- ‡: Points count towards WeatherTech Sprint Cup championship only.

DPi Teams' Championship standings
Pos.	+/–	Team	Points
1		(United States) #31 Whelen Engineering Racing	152
2	2	(United States) #6 Acura Team Penske	147
3	1	(United States) #7 Acura Team Penske	146
4	1	(United States) #5 Mustang Sampling Racing	137
5	2	(United States) #10 Konica Minolta Cadillac	135

LMP2 Teams' Championship standings
Pos.	+/–	Team	Points
1		(United States) #38 Performance Tech Motorsports	99
2		(United States) #52 PR1/Mathiasen Motorsports	95
3		(United States) #18 DragonSpeed	35
4		(United States) #81 DragonSpeed	30

GTLM Teams' Championship standings
Pos.	+/–	Team	Points
1		(United States) #912 Porsche GT Team	126
2		(United States) #3 Corvette Racing	119
3		(United States) #911 Porsche GT Team	117
4		(United States) #25 BMW Team RLL	111
5		(United States) #66 Ford Chip Ganassi Racing	108

GTD Teams' Championship standings
Pos.	+/–	Team	Points
1		(United States) #86 Meyer-Shank Racing with Curb Agajanian	84‡
2		(Canada) #12 AIM Vasser Sullivan	80‡
3		(Canada) #14 AIM Vasser Sullivan	77‡
4		(United States) #73 Park Place Motorsports	77‡
5		(United States) #44 Magnus Racing	76‡

- Note: Only the top five positions are included for all sets of standings.
- ‡: Points count towards WeatherTech Sprint Cup championship only.

DPi Manufacturers' Championship standings
Pos.	+/–	Manufacturer	Points
1		(United States) Cadillac	167
2		(Japan) Acura	166
3		(Japan) Mazda	146
4		(Japan) Nissan	146

GTLM Manufacturers' Championship standings
Pos.	+/–	Manufacturer	Points
1		(Germany) Porsche	135
2		(Germany) BMW	121
3		(United States) Chevrolet	120
4		(United States) Ford	118
5		(Italy) Ferrari	32

GTD Manufacturers' Championship standings
Pos.	+/–	Manufacturer	Points
1		(Italy) Lamborghini	100‡
2		(Japan) Lexus	91‡
3		(Germany) Audi	86‡
4		(Japan) Acura	85‡
5		(Italy) Ferrari	81‡

- Note: Only the top five positions are included for all sets of standings.
- ‡: Points count towards WeatherTech Sprint Cup championship only.

IMSA SportsCar Championship
Previous race: 2019 Sports Car Challenge of Mid-Ohio	2019 season	Next race: 2019 6 Hours of The Glen
