= 2019 BUBBA Burger Sports Car Grand Prix =

Third round of the 2019 IMSA SportsCar Championship season

The layout of the Long Beach Street Circuit

The 2019 BUBBA Burger Sports Car Grand Prix was a sports car race sanctioned by the International Motor Sports Association (IMSA). It was held at Long Beach Street Circuit in Long Beach, California on 13 April 2019. The race was the third round of the 2019 WeatherTech SportsCar Championship.

== Background ==
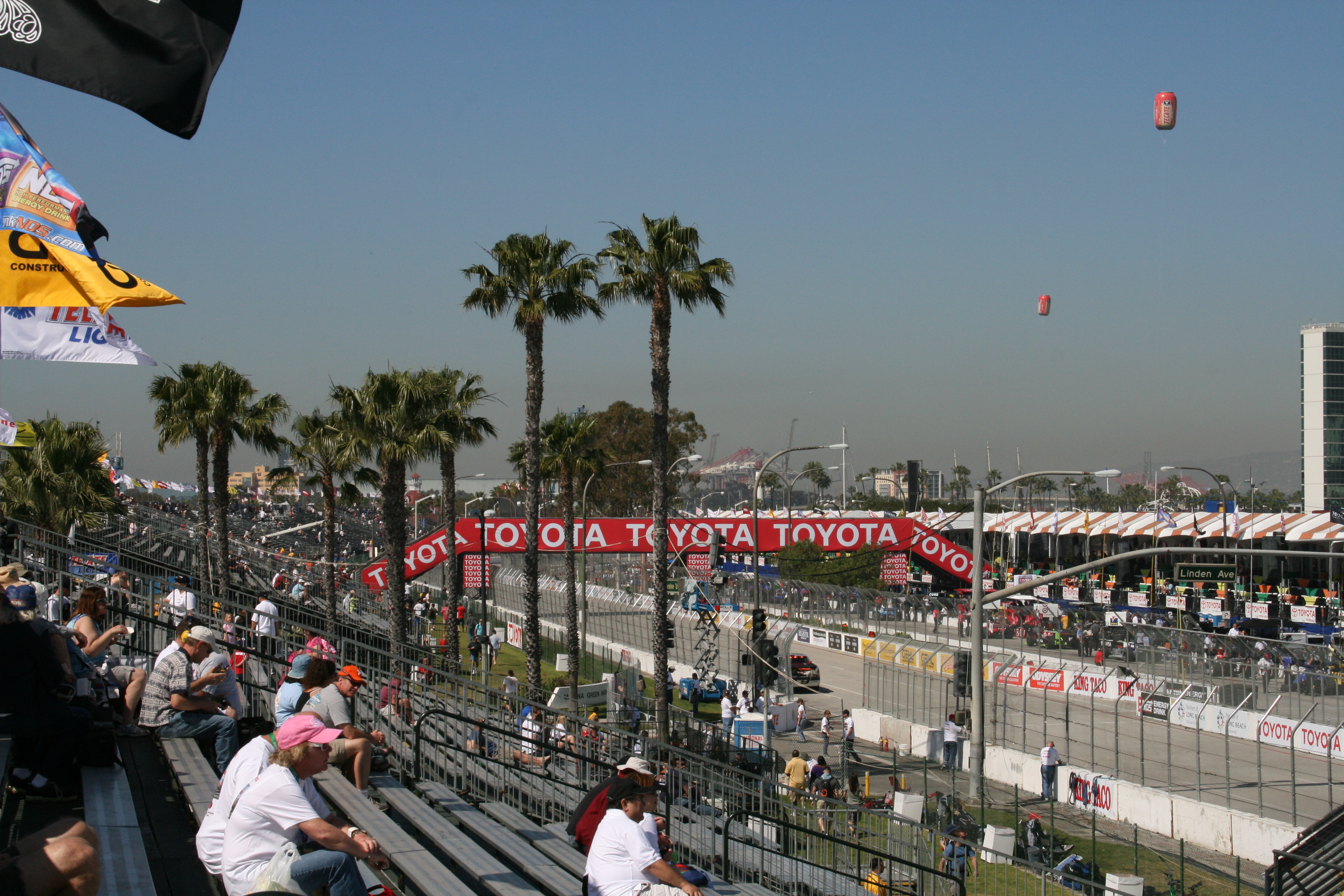
The Long Beach Street Circuit (pictured in 2009), where the race was held.

International Motor Sports Association's (IMSA) president Scott Atherton confirmed the race was part of the schedule for the 2019 IMSA SportsCar Championship (IMSA SCC) in August 2018. It was the sixth consecutive year it was part of the WeatherTech SportsCar Championship, and the thirteenth annual running of the race, counting the period between 2006 and 2013 when it was a round of the Rolex Sports Car Series and the American Le Mans Series respectively. The BUBBA Burger Sports Car Grand Prix was the third of twelve scheduled sports car endurance races of 2019 by IMSA, the shortest of the season in terms of distance, and it was the first round not held as part of the North American Endurance Cup. The race was held at the eleven-turn 1.968 mi (3.167 km) Long Beach street circuit in Long Beach, California on April 13, 2019.

On 4 April 2019, IMSA released a technical bulletin regarding the Balance of Performance for the race. In the Daytona Prototype International (DPi) class, the Acura ARX-05 was made 20 kilograms lighter, and received an increase in turbo boost, along with the Nissan DPi. The Mazda RT24-P was restricted in its boost, while being made five kilograms lighter. The Cadillac DPi-V.R, which won the previous two events of the 2019 season, was given a 10 kilogram increase. In GT Le Mans (GTLM), there were less significant changes. The Porsche 911 RSR was lightened by 10 kilograms, while the Ford GT had a slight reduction in boost.

Before the race, Jordan Taylor and Renger van der Zande led the DPi Drivers' Championship with 67 points, ahead of Pipo Derani, Felipe Nasr, and Eric Curran on countback followed by Hélio Castroneves, Ricky Taylor, and Alexander Rossi in third position with 58 points. With 63 points, Philipp Eng led the GTLM Drivers' Championship by 2 points ahead of Patrick Pilet, Nick Tandy, and Frédéric Makowiecki in second position followed by Connor De Phillippi and Colton Herta with 59 points in third position. Cadillac and Porsche were leading their respective Manufactures' Championships while Konica Minolta Cadillac and Porsche GT Team each led their own Teams' Championships.

=== Entries ===
A total of 19 cars took part in the event split across two classes. There were 11 cars in the Daytona Prototype International class, and eight entries in GT Le Mans (GTLM). The Le Mans Prototype (LMP2) and GT Daytona (GTD) classes would not be participating in the event. There were few changes to the full-season lineups in either class. Kyle Kaiser, who joined the No. 50 Juncos Racing Cadillac DPi-V.R for the 24 Hours of Daytona, returned to the car alongside full-season driver Will Owen on a one-race deal. The Thursday before the race, it was announced one of Ford Chip Ganassi Racing's full-season drivers, Joey Hand, would be unable to compete due to suffering symptoms of the flu. His place would be taken by one of their endurance-event drivers, Sébastien Bourdais, who would also be competing in the IndyCar event.

== Practice ==
There were two practice sessions preceding the start of the race on Saturday, one on Friday morning and one on Friday afternoon. The first session lasted two hours on Friday morning while the second session on Friday afternoon lasted 45 minutes.

In the first practice session, Felipe Nasr set the fastest lap in the No. 31 Whelen Engineering Racing Cadillac, with a time of 1:12.394. Ricky Taylor's No. 7 Acura was second fastest followed by Juan Pablo Montoya in the sister No. 6 Acura Team Penske entry. The GTLM class was topped by the No. 911 Porsche GT Team Porsche 911 RSR of Nick Tandy with a time of 1:17.549, ahead of teammate Earl Bamber in the sister No. 912 Porsche. Oliver Gavin was third fastest in the No. 4 Corvette followed by Jesse Krohn in the No. 24 BMW and Antonio García rounded out the top five. The session was red flagged twice for on-track accidents. 50 minutes into the session, Misha Goikhberg crashed the No. 85 JDC-Miller Motorsports Cadillac at the turn 4 barrier. 17 minutes later, Simon Trummer spun the No. 84 JDC-Miller Motorsports Cadillac before hitting the turn 1 tire wall and causing the second red flag.

Hélio Castroneves led the final session in the No. 7 Acura, with a lap time of 1:11.918. Felipe Nasr's No. 31 Cadillac was second fastest followed by Jonathan Bomarito in the No. 55 Mazda. The GTLM class was topped by the No. 912 Porsche GT Team Porsche 911 RSR of Laurens Vanthoor with a time of 1:16.710. Nick Tandy in the sister No. 911 Porsche was second fastest followed by Oliver Gavin in the No. 4 Corvette.

== Qualifying ==
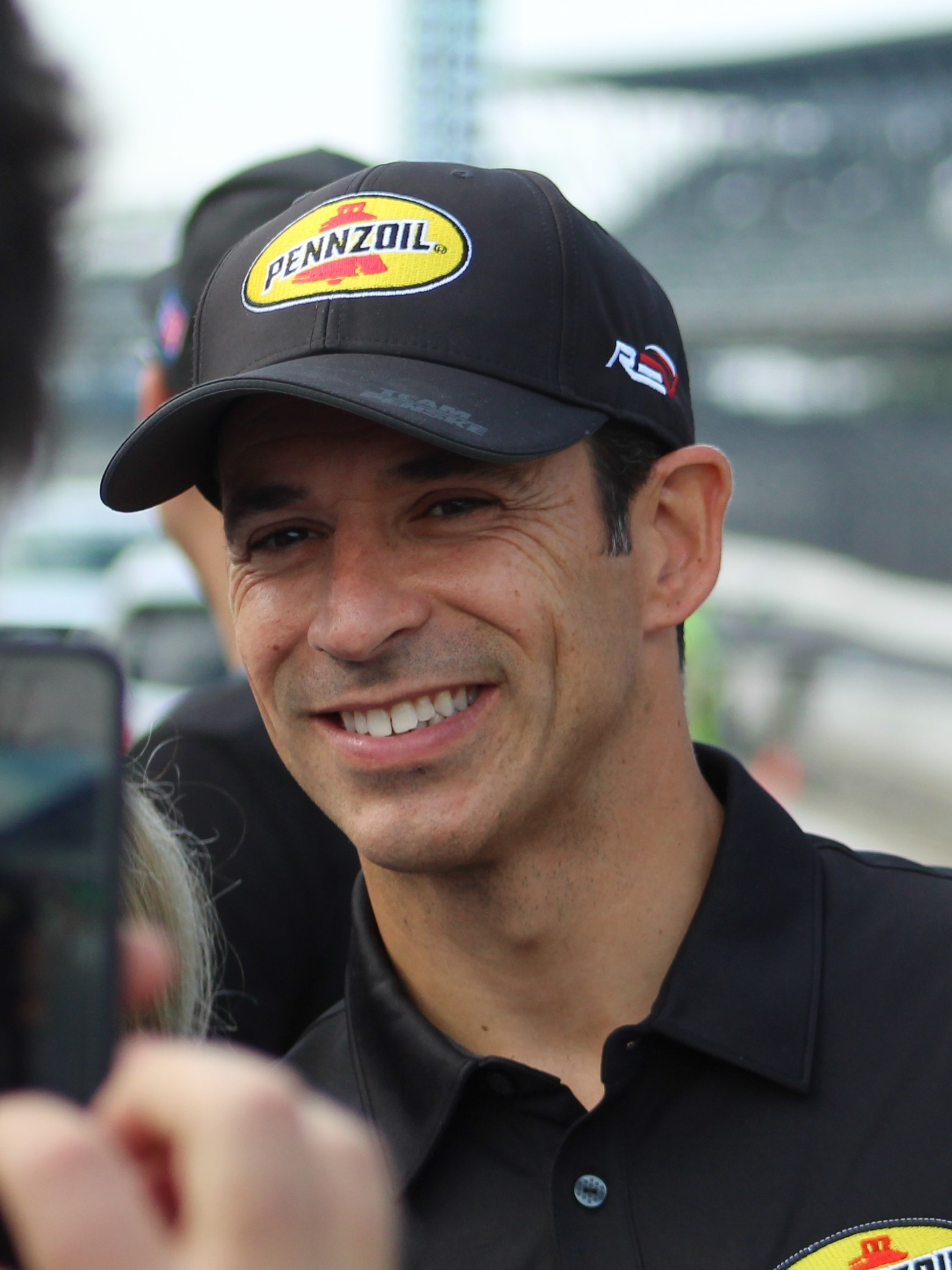
Hélio Castroneves (pictured in 2018) took the overall pole position for Acura Team Penske.

Friday's late afternoon qualification session into was broken two sessions that lasted 15 minutes each. Cars in GTLM were sent out first and, after a ten-minute interval, DPi vehicles drove onto the track. All cars were required to be driven by one participant and the starting order was determined by the competitor's fastest lap. IMSA then arranged the grid so that the DPi field started in front of all GTLM cars.

Hélio Castroneves in the No. 7 Acura set a new track record to clinch his first pole position of the season with a time of 1 minute and 11.332 seconds. He was joined on the grid's front row by Nasr in the No. 31 Cadillac who was 0.218 seconds slower. Following in third was the No. 6 Acura of Juan Pablo Montoya with the No. 5 Mustang Sampling Racing Cadillac of João Barbosa in fourth. Jonathan Bomarito's No. 55 Mazda set the fifth fastest time, but would start at the back of the DPi field after Mazda Team Joest rebuilt the car with a spare monocoque chassis as a result of Bomarito crashing at turn 6.

In GTLM, Nick Tandy clinched his first pole position of the season, with his fastest lap being 0.064 seconds faster than his teammate Laurens Vanthoor in the No. 912 Porsche. Following in third was Oliver Gavin's No. 4 Corvette with the No. 66 Ford GT of Sébastien Bourdais in fourth. Antonio García completed the top five in the No. 3 Corvette followed by Ryan Briscoe's No. 67 Ford GT in sixth, and both BMW Team RLL entries rounded out the GTLM qualifiers.

=== Qualifying Results ===
Pole positions in each class are indicated in bold and by ‡.

Pos.	Class	No.	Team	Driver	Time	Gap	Grid
1	**DPi**	**7**	**(United States) Acura Team Penske**	**(Brazil) Hélio Castroneves**	**1:11.332**	—	1‡
2	DPi	31	(United States) Whelen Engineering Racing	(Brazil) Felipe Nasr	1:11.550	+0.218	2
3	DPi	6	(United States) Acura Team Penske	(Colombia) Juan Pablo Montoya	1:11.847	+0.515	3
4	DPi	5	(United States) Mustang Sampling Racing	(Portugal) João Barbosa	1:11.870	+0.538	4
5	DPi	55	(Germany) Mazda Team Joest	(United States) Jonathan Bomarito	1:11.884	+0.552	11^{1}
6	DPi	77	(Germany) Mazda Team Joest	(United States) Tristan Nunez	1:12.147	+0.815	5
7	DPi	10	(United States) Konica Minolta Cadillac	(United States) Jordan Taylor	1:12.312	+0.980	6
8	DPi	84	(United States) JDC-Miller Motorsports	(Switzerland) Simon Trummer	1:12.455	+1.123	7
9	DPi	85	(United States) JDC-Miller Motorsports	(Canada) Misha Goikhberg	1:12.650	+1.318	8
10	DPi	50	(Argentina) Juncos Racing	(United States) Kyle Kaiser	1:12.694	+1.362	9
11	DPi	54	(United States) CORE Autosport	(United States) Jon Bennett	1:13.389	+2.057	10
12	**GTLM**	**911**	**(United States) Porsche GT Team**	**(United Kingdom) Nick Tandy**	**1:16.313**	**+4.981**	12‡
13	GTLM	912	(United States) Porsche GT Team	(Belgium) Laurens Vanthoor	1:16.377	+5.045	13
14	GTLM	4	(United States) Corvette Racing	(United Kingdom) Oliver Gavin	1:16.520	+5.188	14
15	GTLM	66	(United States) Ford Chip Ganassi Racing	(France) Sébastien Bourdais	1:16.662	+5.330	15
16	GTLM	3	(United States) Corvette Racing	(Spain) Antonio García	1:16.685	+5.353	16
17	GTLM	67	(United States) Ford Chip Ganassi Racing	(Australia) Ryan Briscoe	1:16.874	+5.542	17
18	GTLM	25	(United States) BMW Team RLL	(United Kingdom) Tom Blomqvist	1:17.021	+5.689	18
19	GTLM	24	(United States) BMW Team RLL	(United States) John Edwards	1:17.236	+5.904	19
Sources:

1. Car number 55 was moved to the back of the DPi field as a result of Jonathan Bomarito's crash in Turn 6 during qualifying. A crack was found in the car's monocoque chassis which required the team to rebuild the car using the team's spare tub. In accordance with Article 23.5.3 of the IMSA Sporting Regulations the car was moved to the back of the starting grid in its class.

== Race ==
=== Post-race ===
Sixth-place finishers Derani and Nasr took the lead of the DPi Drivers' Championship with 92 points while Jordan Taylor and Renger van der Zande dropped to fourth. Cameron and Montoya jumped to fifth after being seventh coming into Long Beach. With a total of 91 points, Bamber and Vanthoor's victory allowed them to take the lead of the GTLM Drivers' Championship while the absent Eng dropped to ninth. García and Magnussen advanced from fifth to third. Cadillac and Porsche continued to top their respective Manufacturers' Championships, while Porsche GT Team continued kept their advantage in the GTLM Teams' Championships. Whelen Engineering Racing took the lead of the DPi Teams' Championship with nine rounds left in the season.

=== Race results ===
Class winners are denoted in bold and ‡.

Pos	Class	No	Team	Drivers	Chassis	Laps	Time/Retired
Pos	Class	No	Team	Drivers	Engine	Laps	Time/Retired
1	**DPi**	**5**	**(United States) Mustang Sampling Racing**	**(Portugal) Filipe Albuquerque (Portugal) João Barbosa**	**Cadillac DPi-V.R**	**73**	**1:41:01.368‡**
1	**DPi**	**5**	**(United States) Mustang Sampling Racing**	**(Portugal) Filipe Albuquerque (Portugal) João Barbosa**	**Cadillac 5.5 L V8**	**73**	**1:41:01.368‡**
2	DPi	7	(United States) Acura Team Penske	(Brazil) Hélio Castroneves (United States) Ricky Taylor	Acura ARX-05	73	+0.740
2	DPi	7	(United States) Acura Team Penske	(Brazil) Hélio Castroneves (United States) Ricky Taylor	Acura AR35TT 3.5 L Turbo V6	73	+0.740
3	DPi	6	(United States) Acura Team Penske	(United States) Dane Cameron (Colombia) Juan Pablo Montoya	Acura ARX-05	73	+1.873
3	DPi	6	(United States) Acura Team Penske	(United States) Dane Cameron (Colombia) Juan Pablo Montoya	Acura AR35TT 3.5 L Turbo V6	73	+1.873
4	DPi	77	(Germany) Mazda Team Joest	(United Kingdom) Oliver Jarvis (United States) Tristan Nunez	Mazda RT24-P	73	+21.066
4	DPi	77	(Germany) Mazda Team Joest	(United Kingdom) Oliver Jarvis (United States) Tristan Nunez	Mazda MZ-2.0T 2.0 L Turbo I4	73	+21.066
5	DPi	84	(United States) JDC-Miller Motorsports	(Switzerland) Simon Trummer (South Africa) Stephen Simpson	Cadillac DPi-V.R	73	+25.483
5	DPi	84	(United States) JDC-Miller Motorsports	(Switzerland) Simon Trummer (South Africa) Stephen Simpson	Cadillac 5.5 L V8	73	+25.483
6	DPi	31	(United States) Whelen Engineering Racing	(Brazil) Pipo Derani (Brazil) Felipe Nasr	Cadillac DPi-V.R	73	+35.280
6	DPi	31	(United States) Whelen Engineering Racing	(Brazil) Pipo Derani (Brazil) Felipe Nasr	Cadillac 5.5 L V8	73	+35.280
7	DPi	50	(United States) Juncos Racing	(United States) Kyle Kaiser (United States) Will Owen	Cadillac DPi-V.R	72	+1 Lap
7	DPi	50	(United States) Juncos Racing	(United States) Kyle Kaiser (United States) Will Owen	Cadillac 5.5 L V8	72	+1 Lap
8	**GTLM**	**912**	**(United States) Porsche GT Team**	**(New Zealand) Earl Bamber (Belgium) Laurens Vanthoor**	**Porsche 911 RSR**	**72**	**+1 Lap‡**
8	**GTLM**	**912**	**(United States) Porsche GT Team**	**(New Zealand) Earl Bamber (Belgium) Laurens Vanthoor**	**Porsche 4.0 L Flat-6**	**72**	**+1 Lap‡**
9	GTLM	3	(United States) Corvette Racing	(Spain) Antonio García (Denmark) Jan Magnussen	Chevrolet Corvette C7.R	72	+1 Lap
9	GTLM	3	(United States) Corvette Racing	(Spain) Antonio García (Denmark) Jan Magnussen	Chevrolet LT5.5 5.5 L V8	72	+1 Lap
10	GTLM	4	(United States) Corvette Racing	(United Kingdom) Oliver Gavin (United States) Tommy Milner	Chevrolet Corvette C7.R	72	+1 Lap
10	GTLM	4	(United States) Corvette Racing	(United Kingdom) Oliver Gavin (United States) Tommy Milner	Chevrolet LT5.5 5.5 L V8	72	+1 Lap
11 DNF	GTLM	66	(United States) Ford Chip Ganassi Racing	(France) Sébastien Bourdais (Germany) Dirk Müller	Ford GT	71	Out of Fuel
11 DNF	GTLM	66	(United States) Ford Chip Ganassi Racing	(France) Sébastien Bourdais (Germany) Dirk Müller	Ford EcoBoost 3.5 L Turbo V6	71	Out of Fuel
12	GTLM	911	(United States) Porsche GT Team	(France) Patrick Pilet (United Kingdom) Nick Tandy	Porsche 911 RSR	71	+2 Laps
12	GTLM	911	(United States) Porsche GT Team	(France) Patrick Pilet (United Kingdom) Nick Tandy	Porsche 4.0 L Flat-6	71	+2 Laps
13	GTLM	67	(United States) Ford Chip Ganassi Racing	(Australia) Ryan Briscoe (United Kingdom) Richard Westbrook	Ford GT	71	+2 Laps
13	GTLM	67	(United States) Ford Chip Ganassi Racing	(Australia) Ryan Briscoe (United Kingdom) Richard Westbrook	Ford EcoBoost 3.5 L Turbo V6	71	+2 Laps
14	GTLM	25	(United States) BMW Team RLL	(United Kingdom) Tom Blomqvist (United States) Connor De Phillippi	BMW M8 GTE	71	+2 Laps
14	GTLM	25	(United States) BMW Team RLL	(United Kingdom) Tom Blomqvist (United States) Connor De Phillippi	BMW S63 4.0 L Twin-turbo V8	71	+2 Laps
15	DPi	55	(Germany) Mazda Team Joest	(United States) Jonathan Bomarito (United Kingdom) Harry Tincknell	Mazda RT24-P	71	+2 Laps
15	DPi	55	(Germany) Mazda Team Joest	(United States) Jonathan Bomarito (United Kingdom) Harry Tincknell	Mazda MZ-2.0T 2.0 L Turbo I4	71	+2 Laps
16	GTLM	24	(United States) BMW Team RLL	(United States) John Edwards (Finland) Jesse Krohn	BMW M8 GTE	71	+2 Laps
16	GTLM	24	(United States) BMW Team RLL	(United States) John Edwards (Finland) Jesse Krohn	BMW S63 4.0 L Twin-turbo V8	71	+2 Laps
17	DPi	85	(United States) JDC-Miller Motorsports	(Canada) Misha Goikhberg (France) Tristan Vautier	Cadillac DPi-V.R	68	+5 Laps
17	DPi	85	(United States) JDC-Miller Motorsports	(Canada) Misha Goikhberg (France) Tristan Vautier	Cadillac 5.5 L V8	68	+5 Laps
18 DNF	DPi	10	(United States) Konica Minolta Cadillac	(United States) Jordan Taylor (Netherlands) Renger van der Zande	Cadillac DPi-V.R	30	Crash
18 DNF	DPi	10	(United States) Konica Minolta Cadillac	(United States) Jordan Taylor (Netherlands) Renger van der Zande	Cadillac 5.5 L V8	30	Crash
19 DNF	DPi	54	(United States) CORE Autosport	(United States) Jon Bennett (United States) Colin Braun	Nissan DPi	0	Crash
19 DNF	DPi	54	(United States) CORE Autosport	(United States) Jon Bennett (United States) Colin Braun	Nissan VR38DETT 3.8 L Turbo V6	0	Crash

== Standings after the race ==
DPi Drivers' Championship standings
Pos.	+/–	Driver	Points
1	1	(Brazil) Pipo Derani (Brazil) Felipe Nasr	92
2	1	(Brazil) Hélio Castroneves (United States) Ricky Taylor	90
3	1	(Portugal) Filipe Albuquerque (Portugal) João Barbosa	89
4	3	(United States) Jordan Taylor (Netherlands) Renger van der Zande	88
5	2	(United States) Dane Cameron (Colombia) Juan Pablo Montoya	77

LMP2 Drivers' Championship standings
Pos.	+/–	Driver	Points
1		(Canada) Cameron Cassels (United States) Kyle Masson	67
2		(United States) Matt McMurry (France) Gabriel Aubry	60
3		(Colombia) Sebastián Saavedra (Venezuela) Pastor Maldonado (Republic of Ireland) Ryan Cullen (Mexico) Roberto González	35
4		(United States) Andrew Evans	35
5		(United States) Robert Masson (United States) Kris Wright	32

GTLM Drivers' Championship standings
Pos.	+/–	Driver	Points
1	4	(New Zealand) Earl Bamber (Belgium) Laurens Vanthoor	91
2		(France) Patrick Pilet (United Kingdom) Nick Tandy	87
3	3	(Spain) Antonio García (Denmark) Jan Magnussen	87
4		(Germany) Dirk Müller (France) Sebastien Bourdais	84
5	2	(United States) Connor De Phillippi	83

GTD Drivers' Championship standings
Pos.	+/–	Driver	Points
1		(Italy) Mirko Bortolotti (Netherlands) Rik Breukers (Switzerland) Rolf Ineichen	70
2		(United States) Frankie Montecalvo (United States) Townsend Bell (United States) Aaron Telitz	54
3		(United States) Andy Lally (United States) John Potter (United States) Spencer Pumpelly	53
4		(Germany) Mario Farnbacher (United States) Trent Hindman (United States) Justin Marks	52
5		(Netherlands) Jeroen Bleekemolen (United States) Ben Keating (Brazil) Felipe Fraga	51

- Note: Only the top five positions are included for all sets of standings.

DPi Teams' Championship standings
Pos.	+/–	Team	Points
1	1	(United States) #31 Whelen Engineering Racing	92
2	1	(United States) #7 Acura Team Penske	90
3	1	(United States) #5 Mustang Sampling Racing	89
4	3	(United States) #10 Konica Minolta Cadillac	88
5	2	(United States) #6 Acura Team Penske	77

LMP2 Teams' Championship standings
Pos.	+/–	Team	Points
1		(United States) #38 Performance Tech Motorsports	67
2		(United States) #52 PR1/Mathiasen Motorsports	60
3		(United States) #18 DragonSpeed	35
4		(United States) #81 DragonSpeed	30

GTLM Teams' Championship standings
Pos.	+/–	Team	Points
1	3	(United States) #912 Porsche GT Team	91
2	1	(United States) #911 Porsche GT Team	87
3	2	(United States) #3 Corvette Racing	87
4	1	(United States) #66 Ford Chip Ganassi Racing	84
5	3	(United States) #25 BMW Team RLL	83

GTD Teams' Championship standings
Pos.	+/–	Team	Points
1		(Austria) #11 GRT Grasser Racing Team	70
2		(Canada) #12 AIM Vasser Sullivan	54
3		(United States) #44 Magnus Racing	53
4		(United States) #86 Meyer-Shank Racing with Curb Agajanian	52
5		(United States) #33 Mercedes-AMG Team Riley Motorsports	51

- Note: Only the top five positions are included for all sets of standings.

DPi Manufacturers' Championship standings
Pos.	+/–	Manufacturer	Points
1		(United States) Cadillac	105
2		(Japan) Acura	96
3		(Japan) Nissan	88
4		(Japan) Mazda	86

GTLM Manufacturers' Championship standings
Pos.	+/–	Manufacturer	Points
1		(Germany) Porsche	100
2		(Germany) BMW	91
3		(United States) Ford	90
4		(United States) Chevrolet	88
5		(Italy) Ferrari	32

GTD Manufacturers' Championship standings
Pos.	+/–	Manufacturer	Points
1		(Italy) Lamborghini	70
2		(Germany) Audi	60
3		(Japan) Lexus	56
4		(Italy) Ferrari	56
5		(Germany) Mercedes-AMG	54

- Note: Only the top five positions are included for all sets of standings.

IMSA SportsCar Championship
Previous race: 12 Hours of Sebring	2019 season	Next race: Sports Car Challenge of Mid-Ohio
