= Jack Hawksworth =

British racing driver (born 1991)

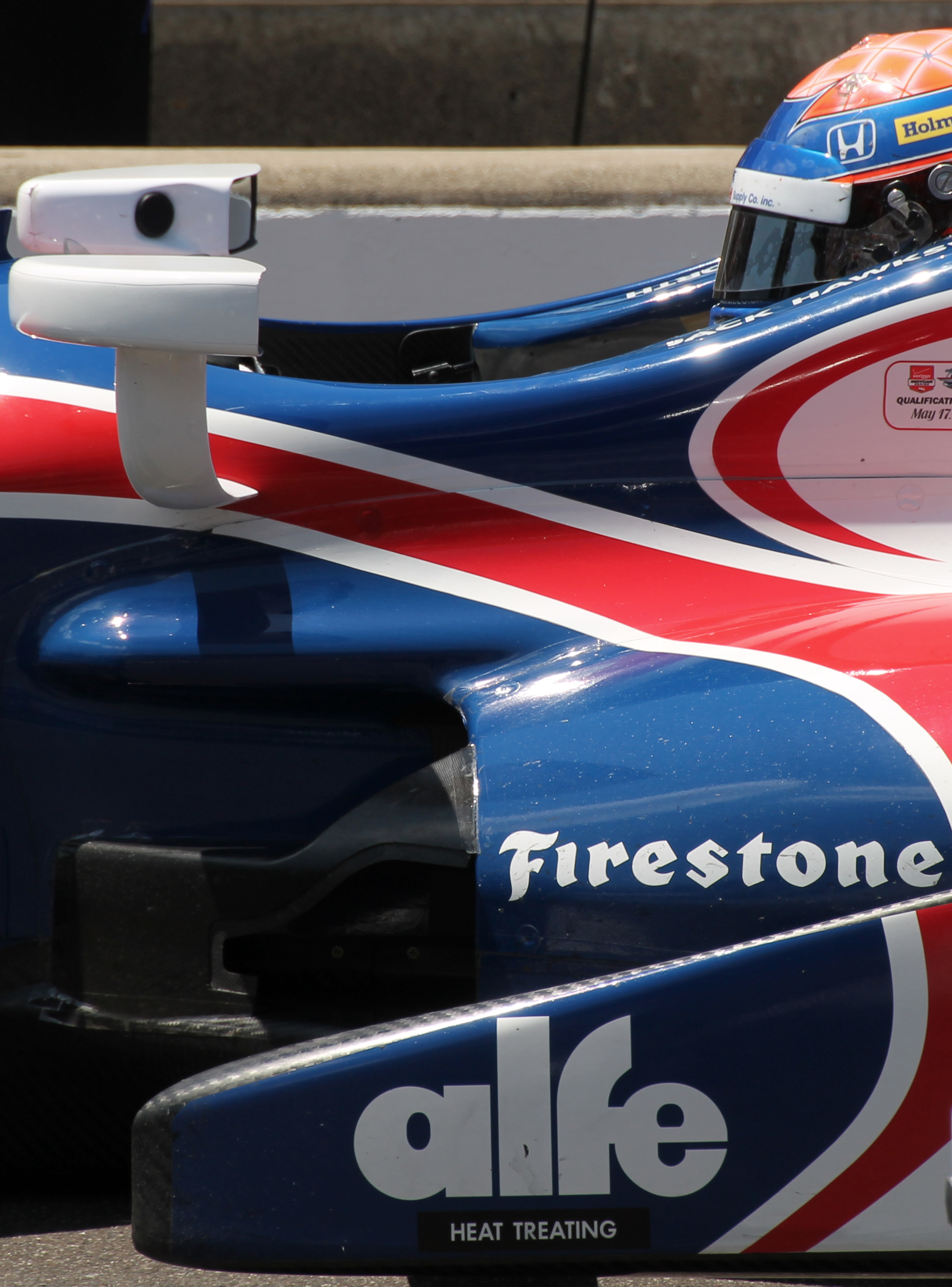
- Hawksworth participating in the Pit Stop Challenge at the 2015 Indianapolis 500.
- Nationality: (United Kingdom) British
- Born: Jack William Hawksworth; 28 February 1991 (age 35) Bradford, West Yorkshire, England

IMSA SportsCar Championship career
- Debut season: 2014
- Current team: Vasser Sullivan Racing
- Categorisation: FIA Gold
- Car number: 14
- Former teams: RSR Racing, Starworks Motorsport, 3GT Racing
- Starts: 109
- Wins: 14
- Poles: 21
- Fastest laps: 13
- Best finish: 1st in 2023

Previous series
- 2014–2016 2013 2012 2011 2011: IndyCar Series; Indy Lights; Star Mazda Championship; Formula Renault 2.0 UK; Formula Renault 2.0 NEC

Championship titles
- 2023 2020 2012: IMSA - GTD Pro; WeatherTech Sprint Cup; Star Mazda Championship

NASCAR O'Reilly Auto Parts Series career
- 1 race run over 1 year
- 2019 position: 57th
- Best finish: 57th (2019)
- First race: 2019 B&L Transport 170 (Mid-Ohio)
Wins	Top tens	Poles
0	0	0
- Statistics up to date as of 18 November 2019.

Jack William Hawksworth (born 28 February 1991) is a British professional racing driver from Bradford, West Yorkshire. As of 2020, he competes in the WeatherTech SportsCar Championship for Vasser Sullivan Racing in a Lexus RCF GT3.

Hawksworth has also raced in the Star Mazda Championship, Formula Renault 2.0, IndyCar Series, NASCAR Xfinity Series, and NASCAR Craftsman Truck Series.

== Biography ==
Hawksworth started racing karts at thirteen years old and was Junior Rotax Euro Max champion and second in the World finals by the time he was fifteen. After graduating from Juniors, he went on to have a career as a professional karter leading to success in KZ1 karting winning the 2009 Andrea Margutti Trophy as well as winning races in the German championship and claiming podiums in the KZ1 and KZ2 European Championships finishing sixth overall in the 2010 KZ1 European Championship for the Maddox Team. In a one-off appearance to domestic racing Hawksworth won the 2010 British Kart Masters Grand Prix in Senior Max with Protrain Racing.

Hawksworth graduated to open wheel racing in late 2010 and competed in the 2010 Formula Renault Winter series with Mark Burdett Motorsport. He claimed pole position in four out of the six races and finished third overall in the championship and top rookie ahead of the Red Bull Juniors of Daniil Kvyat, Carlos Sainz, Jr. and McLaren Autosport Award winner Oliver Rowland. Hawksworth went on to compete in the 2011 Formula Renault UK championship changing teams halfway through and finishing fourth overall in the series with a win at Croft.

In 2012, Hawksworth moved to the United States to compete in the 2012 Star Mazda Championship season with Team Pelfrey as part of the Mazda Road to Indy. He broke every record in the series (wins, poles and fastest laps) on his way to claiming the title in his rookie campaign. Hawksworth climbed to the Indy Lights for 2013, by joining Schmidt Peterson Motorsports.

During a practice session for the 2014 Pocono IndyCar 500, Hawksworth suffered a myocardial contusion after a crash, and missed the race.

On 11 November 2016, it was announced that 3GT Racing had signed Hawksworth and Robert Alon to race the No. 15 Lexus RC F GT3 in the 2017 IMSA WeatherTech SportsCar Championship in the GT Daytona class. Hawksworth and Alon competed in the first eight races of the 2017 IMSA WeatherTech SportsCar Championship together before a team decision saw Alon switch places with veteran Scott Pruett for the final four rounds. Hawksworth and Alon recorded a season's best finish of fifth in GT Daytona for the No. 15 at the 2017 6 Hours of Watkins Glen.

In 2023, Hawksworth won the 2023 IMSA GTD Pro Championship alongside Ben Barnicoat. It came on the back of winning Petit Le Mans at the end of the 2022 season. The pair followed this up with a win at the Mobil One 12 hours of Sebring in 2024.

== Racing record ==
=== Racing career summary ===
Season	Series	Team	Races	Wins	Poles	F/Laps	Podiums	Points	Position
2011	Formula Renault 2.0 UK Championship	Mark Burdett Motorsport	12	0	0	1	2	333	4th
2011	Formula Renault 2.0 UK Championship	Atech Reid GP	8	1	1	1	2	333	4th
2011	Formula Renault 2.0 NEC	Van Amersfoort Racing	3	0	0	0	0	26	32nd
2011	Eurocup Formula Renault 2.0	KTR	0	0	0	0	0	0	NC
2012	Star Mazda Championship	Team Pelfrey	16	8	10	11	12	397	**1st**
2013	Indy Lights	Schmidt Peterson Motorsports	12	3	2	2	6	412	4th
2014	IndyCar Series	Bryan Herta Autosport	17	0	0	0	1	366	17th
2014	United SportsCar Championship - PC	RSR Racing	4	1	1	0	1	121	14th
2015	IndyCar Series	A. J. Foyt Enterprises	16	0	0	1	0	256	17th
2015	United SportsCar Championship - PC	RSR Racing	2	0	0	1	0	1	35th
2016	IndyCar Series	A. J. Foyt Enterprises	16	0	0	0	0	229	20th
2016	IMSA SportsCar Championship - PC	Starworks Motorsport	1	0	0	0	0	0	NC
2017	IMSA SportsCar Championship - GTD	3GT Racing	12	0	0	2	0	248	14th
2018	IMSA SportsCar Championship - GTD	3GT Racing	11	0	3	1	0	239	10th
2019	IMSA SportsCar Championship - GTD	AIM Vasser Sullivan	11	2	1	2	2	237	6th
2019	Blancpain GT Series Endurance Cup	Strakka Racing	3	0	0	0	0	10	23rd
2019	Blancpain GT World Challenge Europe	Tech 1 Racing	6	0	0	0	0	6	20th
2019	NASCAR Xfinity Series	Joe Gibbs Racing	1	0	0	0	0	32	57th
2020	IMSA SportsCar Championship - GTD	AIM Vasser Sullivan	11	3	3	1	5	265	4th
2021	IMSA SportsCar Championship - GTD	Vasser Sullivan Racing	12	1	2	0	3	2640	7th
2022	IMSA SportsCar Championship - GTD Pro	Vasser Sullivan Racing	8	2	2	0	6	2693	6th
2022	IMSA SportsCar Championship - GTD	Vasser Sullivan Racing	1	0	0	0	0	264	55th
2022	Michelin Pilot Challenge - GS	TGR Smooge Racing	1	0	0	0	0	150	57th
2023	IMSA SportsCar Championship - GTD Pro	Vasser Sullivan Racing	11	2	3	1	9	3760	**1st**
2023	European Le Mans Series - LMP2 Pro-Am	Algarve Pro Racing	4	0	0	0	0	18	18th
2024	IMSA SportsCar Championship - GTD Pro	Vasser Sullivan	10	1	1	0	2	2859	5th
2024	IMSA SportsCar Championship - GTD	Vasser Sullivan	1	0	0	0	0	192	66th
2024	Michelin Pilot Challenge - GS	TGR Team Hattori Motorsports	4	0	1	0	0	780	29th
2024	FIA World Endurance Championship - LMGT3	Akkodis ASP Team	1	0	0	0	0	1	28th
2024	24 Hours of Le Mans - LMGT3	Akkodis ASP Team	1	0	0	0	0	N/A	10th
2024	NASCAR Craftsman Truck Series	Tricon Garage	1	0	0	0	0	0	NC†
2025	IMSA SportsCar Championship - GTD	Vasser Sullivan Racing	10	0	3	0	5	2851	4th
2025	IMSA SportsCar Championship - GTD Pro	Vasser Sullivan Racing	1	0	0	0	0	300	27th
2025	FIA World Endurance Championship - LMGT3	Akkodis ASP Team	2	0	0	0	0	0	31st
2025	24 Hours of Le Mans - LMGT3	Akkodis ASP Team	1	0	0	0	0	N/A	DNF
2025	GT World Challenge Europe Endurance Cup	Garage 59	1	0	0	0	0	0	NC
2026	IMSA SportsCar Championship - GTD Pro	Vasser Sullivan Racing	10	2	2	1	2	2779	7th
2026	IMSA SportsCar Championship - GTD	Vasser Sullivan Racing	1	0	0	1	0	260	64th
2026	Michelin Pilot Challenge - GS	TGR Koch Copeland Motorsports	1	0	0	0	0	10	76th
2026	FIA World Endurance Championship - LMGT3	Akkodis ASP Team	1	0	0	0	1	36	16th
2026	GT World Challenge Europe Endurance Cup	Garage 59	1	0	0	1	0	0	NC†

=== Complete Formula Renault 2.0 UK Championship results ===
(key) (Races in bold indicate pole position) (Races in italics indicate fastest lap)

Year	Entrant	1	2	3	4	5	6	7	8	9	10	11	12	13	14	15	16	17	18	19	20	DC	Points
2011	Mark Burdett Motorsport	BHI; 1; 6	BHI; 2; 3	DON; 1; 4	DON; 2; 4	THR; 1; 6	THR; 2; 7	OUL; 1; 2	OUL; 2 Ret	**CRO**; **1**; 1	CRO; 2 Ret	SNE; 1; 2	SNE; 2 Ret	SIL; 1; 12	SIL; 2; 7	ROC; 1 Ret	ROC; 2; 4	BHGP; 1; 6	BHGP; 2; 11	SIL; 1; 5	SIL; 2; 6	4th	333

=== Complete Formula Renault 2.0 NEC results ===
(key) (Races in bold indicate pole position) (Races in italics indicate fastest lap)

Year	Entrant	1	2	3	4	5	6	7	8	9	10	11	12	13	14	15	16	17	18	19	20	DC	Points
2011	Van Amersfoort Racing	HOC; 1	HOC; 2	HOC; 3	SPA; 1	SPA; 2	NÜR; 1	NÜR; 2	ASS; 1	ASS; 2	ASS; 3	OSC; 1	OSC; 2	ZAN; 1	ZAN; 2	MST; 1	MST; 2	MST; 3	MNZ; 1 Ret	MNZ; 2; 9	MNZ; 3; 7	32nd	26

(key)

=== Star Mazda Championship ===
Year	Team	1	2	3	4	5	6	7	8	9	10	11	12	13	14	15	16	17	Rank	Points
2012	Team Pelfrey	STP; 2	**STP**; 1	**BAR**; 1	**BAR**; 2	IND; 7	IOW; 15	**TOR**; 1	**TOR**; 1	EDM; 7	**EDM**; 1	**TRO**; 1	**TRO**; 12	BAL; 1	**BAL**; 2	**LAG**; 1	LAG; 2	ATL	1st	397

=== Indy Lights ===
Year	Team	1	2	3	4	5	6	7	8	9	10	11	12	Rank	Points
2013	Schmidt Peterson Motorsports	STP; 1	ALA; 2	LBH; 8	INDY; 10	MIL; 8	IOW; 3	POC; 5	**TOR**; 1	MOH; 3	**BAL**; 1	HOU; 6	FON; 9	4th	412

=== IndyCar Series ===
Year	Team	No.	Chassis	Engine	1	2	3	4	5	6	7	8	9	10	11	12	13	14	15	16	17	18	Rank	Points	Ref
2014	Bryan Herta Autosport	98	Dallara DW12	Honda	STP; 21	LBH; 15	ALA; 12	IMS; 7	INDY; 20	DET; 19	DET; 14	TXS; 15	HOU; 6	HOU; 3	POC; DNS	IOW; 15	TOR; 13	TOR; 6	MOH; 16	MIL; 10	SNM; 15	FON; 15	17th	366	
2015	A. J. Foyt Enterprises	41	Dallara DW12	Honda	STP; 8	NLA; 24	LBH; 14	ALA; 21	IMS; 23	INDY; 24	DET; 7	DET; 7	TXS; 23	TOR; 14	FON; 10	MIL; 17	IOW; 13	MOH; 8	POC; 22	SNM; 19			17th	256	
2016	A. J. Foyt Enterprises	41	Dallara DW12	Honda	STP; 11	PHX; 19	LBH; 21	ALA; 19	IMS; 20	INDY; 16	DET; 22	DET; 19	RDA; 11	IOW; 15	TOR; 21	MOH; 21	POC; 14	TXS; 17	WGL; 16	SNM; 18			20th	229	

==== Indianapolis 500 ====
Year	Chassis	Engine	Start	Finish	Team
2014	Dallara	Honda	13	20	Bryan Herta Autosport
2015	Dallara	Honda	28	24	A. J. Foyt Enterprises
2016	Dallara	Honda	31	16	A. J. Foyt Enterprises

=== Complete IMSA SportsCar Championship results ===
(key) (Races in bold indicate pole position, Results are overall/class)

Year	Entrant	Class	Make	Engine	1	2	3	4	5	6	7	8	9	10	11	12	Rank	Points	Ref
2014	RSR Racing	PC	Oreca FLM09	Chevrolet LS3 6.2 L V8	DAY	SEB	LGA	KAN	WGL	IMS; 1	ELK; 4	VIR	COA; 5	**PET**; 4			14th	121	
2015	RSR Racing	PC	Oreca FLM09	Chevrolet LS3 6.2 L V8	DAY; 4	SEB	LGA	DET	WGL	MOS	LIM	ELK	COA	PET; 6			35th	1	
2016	Starworks Motorsport	PC	Oreca FLM09	Chevrolet LS3 6.2 L V8	DAY; NC	SEB	LBH	LGA	DET	WGL	MOS	LIM	ELK	COA	PET		NC	0	
2017	3GT Racing	GTD	Lexus RC F GT3	Toyota 2UR 5.0 L V8	DAY; 14	SEB; 13	LBH; 11	COA; 13	DET; 7	WGL; 5	MOS; 12	LIM; 7	ELK; 10	VIR; 13	LGA; 13	PET; 8	14th	248	
2018	3GT Racing	GTD	Lexus RC F GT3	Toyota 2UR 5.0 L V8	DAY; 9	SEB; 5	**MOH**; 4	DET; 12	**WGL**; 4	MOS; 7	LIM; 5	ELK; 12	**VIR**; 8	LGA; 7	PET; 10		10th	239	
2019	AIM Vasser Sullivan	GTD	Lexus RC F GT3	Toyota 2UR 5.0 L V8	DAY; 5	SEB; 15	**MOH**; 1	DET; 1†	WGL; 5	MOS; 12	LIM; 6	ELK; 4	VIR; 13	LGA; 9	PET; 9		6th	237	
2020	AIM Vasser Sullivan	GTD	Lexus RC F GT3	Toyota 2UR 5.0 L V8	DAY; 9	DAY; 1	SEB; 1†	**ELK**; 3	VIR; 4	ATL; 10	**MOH**; 1	**CLT**; 8	PET; 2	LGA; 11	SEB; 12		4th	265	
2021	Vasser Sullivan Racing	GTD	Lexus RC F GT3	Toyota 2UR 5.0 L V8	DAY; 16	SEB; 7	MOH; 13	DET; 4†	**WGL**; 6	WGL; 1†	LIM; 3	**ELK**; 5	LGA; 6	LBH; 4	VIR; 3	PET; 15	7th	2640	
2022	Vasser Sullivan Racing	GTD Pro	Lexus RC F GT3	Toyota 2UR 5.0 L V8	DAY; 4	SEB; 7	LBH; 2	LGA; 2					LIM; 3	**ELK**; 1	VIR; 3	**PET**; 1	6th	2693	
2022	Vasser Sullivan Racing	GTD	Lexus RC F GT3	Toyota 2UR 5.0 L V8					MOH; 7	DET	WGL	MOS					55th	264	
2023	Vasser Sullivan Racing	GTD Pro	Lexus RC F GT3	Toyota 2UR 5.0 L V8	DAY; 3	SEB; 2	**LBH**; 1	LGA; 2	WGL; 1	**MOS**; 4	LIM; 2	ELK; 2	**VIR**; 2	IMS; 3	**PET**; 8		1st	3760	
2024	VasserSullivan	GTD Pro	Lexus RC F GT3	Toyota 2UR 5.0 L V8	DAY; 11	**SEB**; 1		LGA; 4	DET; 2	WGL; 4	MOS; 9	ELK; 9	VIR; 6	IMS; 4	PET; 13		5th	2859	
2024	VasserSullivan	GTD	Lexus RC F GT3	Toyota 2UR 5.0 L V8			LBH; 15										66th	192	
2025	Vasser Sullivan Racing	GTD	Lexus RC F GT3	Toyota 2UR 5.0 L V8	DAY; 14	SEB; 2	**LBH**; 2	LGA; 2		WGL; 11	**MOS**; 3	ELK; 11	**VIR**; 9	IMS; 9	PET; 3		4th	2851	
2025	Vasser Sullivan Racing	GTD Pro	Lexus RC F GT3	Toyota 2UR 5.0 L V8					DET; 4								27th	300	
2026	Vasser Sullivan Racing	GTD Pro	Lexus RC F GT3	Toyota 2UR 5.0 L V8	DAY; 10	**SEB**; 11		**LGA**; 9	DET; 6	**WGL**; 1	MOS; 1	ELK; 6	VIR; 7	IMS; 5	PET; 10		7th	2779	
2026	Vasser Sullivan Racing	GTD	Lexus RC F GT3	Toyota 2UR 5.0 L V8			LBH; 5										64th	260	

^{†} Points only counted towards the WeatherTech Sprint Cup and not the overall GTD Championship.

=== Complete GT World Challenge Europe results ===
(key) (Races in bold indicate pole position) (Races in italics indicate fastest lap)

==== GT World Challenge Europe Endurance Cup ====
Year	Team	Car	Class	1	2	3	4	5	6	7	Pos.	Points
2019	Strakka Racing	Mercedes-AMG GT3	Pro	MNZ; 22	SIL; 5	LEC					23th	10
2019	Strakka Racing	Mercedes-AMG GT3	Pro-Am				SPA; 6H; 45	SPA; 12H; 33	SPA; 24H; 32	CAT	13th	27
2025	Garage 59	McLaren 720S GT3 Evo	Bronze	LEC	MNZ	SPA; 6H; 49	SPA; 12H; 22	SPA; 24H; 22	NÜR	BAR	11th	34
2026	Garage 59	McLaren 720S GT3 Evo	Pro	LEC	MNZ	SPA; 6H	SPA; 12H	SPA; 24H	NÜR	ALG; 6	NC‡	0‡

==== GT World Challenge Europe Sprint Cup ====
Year	Team	Car	Class	1	2	3	4	5	6	7	8	9	10	Pos.	Points
2019	Tech 1 Racing	Lexus RC F GT3	Pro	BRH; 1	BRH; 2	MIS; 1	MIS; 2	ZAN; 1; 15	ZAN; 2 Ret	NÜR; 1; 19	NÜR; 2; 5	HUN; 1; 26	HUN; 2; 22	20th	6

=== NASCAR ===
(key) (Bold – Pole position awarded by qualifying time. Italics – Pole position earned by points standings or practice time. * – Most laps led.)

==== Xfinity Series ====
NASCAR Xfinity Series results
Year	Team	No.	Make	1	2	3	4	5	6	7	8	9	10	11	12	13	14	15	16	17	18	19	20	21	22	23	24	25	26	27	28	29	30	31	32	33	NXSC	Pts	Ref
2019	Joe Gibbs Racing	18	Toyota	DAY	ATL	LVS	PHO	CAL	TEX	BRI	RCH	TAL	DOV	CLT	POC	MCH	IOW	CHI	DAY	KEN	NHA	IOW	GLN	MOH; 15	BRI	ROA	DAR	IND	LVS	RCH	CLT	DOV	KAN	TEX	PHO	HOM	57th	32	

==== Craftsman Truck Series ====
NASCAR Craftsman Truck Series results
Year	Team	No.	Make	1	2	3	4	5	6	7	8	9	10	11	12	13	14	15	16	17	18	19	20	21	22	23	NCTC	Pts	Ref
2024	Tricon Garage	1	Toyota	DAY	ATL	LVS	BRI	COA; 6	MAR	TEX	KAN	DAR	NWS	CLT	GTW	NSH	POC	IRP	RCH	MLW	BRI	KAN	TAL	HOM	MAR	PHO	85th	0^{1}	

=== Complete European Le Mans Series results ===
(key) (Races in bold indicate pole position; results in italics indicate fastest lap)

Year	Entrant	Class	Chassis	Engine	1	2	3	4	5	6	Rank	Points
2023	Algarve Pro Racing	LMP2 Pro-Am	Oreca 07	Gibson GK428 4.2 L V8	CAT; 8	LEC; 8	ARA	SPA	ALG; 7	ALG; 8	18th	18

=== Complete FIA World Endurance Championship results ===
(key) (Races in bold indicate pole position; results in italics indicate fastest lap)

Year	Entrant	Class	Chassis	Engine	1	2	3	4	5	6	7	8	Rank	Points
2024	Akkodis ASP Team	LMGT3	Lexus RC F GT3	Lexus 2UR-GSE 5.0 L V8	QAT	IMO	SPA	LMS; 10	SÃO	COA	FUJ	BHR	28th	8
2025	Akkodis ASP Team	LMGT3	Lexus RC F GT3	Lexus 2UR-GSE 5.0 L V8	QAT	IMO	SPA	LMS; Ret	SÃO	COA; Ret	FUJ	BHR	31st	0
2026	Akkodis ASP Team	LMGT3	Lexus RC F GT3	Lexus 2UR-GSE 5.4 L V8	IMO	SPA	LMS; 2	SÃO	COA	FUJ	CAT	MNZ	16th	36

=== Complete 24 Hours of Le Mans results ===
Year	Team	Co-Drivers	Car	Class	Laps	Pos.	Class Pos.
2024	(France) Akkodis ASP Team	(Japan) Takeshi Kimura (France) Esteban Masson	Lexus RC F GT3	LMGT3	279	37th	10th
2025	(France) Akkodis ASP Team	(Germany) Finn Gehrsitz (France) Arnold Robin	Lexus RC F GT3	LMGT3	268	DNF	DNF
2026	(France) Akkodis ASP Team	(France) Hadrien David (Belgium) Tom Van Rompuy	Lexus RC F GT3	LMGT3	335	34th	2nd

Sporting positions
Preceded by Tristan Vautier	Star Mazda Championship; Champion; 2012	Succeeded by Matthew Brabham (Pro Mazda)
Preceded by Zach Robichon	WeatherTech Sprint Cup; Champion; 2020; With: Aaron Telitz	Succeeded by Ross Gunn; Roman De Angelis
Preceded by Matt Campbell; Mathieu Jaminet	IMSA SportsCar Championship; GTD Pro Champion; 2023; With: Ben Barnicoat	Succeeded by Laurin Heinrich
