= 2018 Northeast Grand Prix =

Sports car race

Track map of Lime Rock Park

The 2018 Northeast Grand Prix was a sports car race sanctioned by the International Motor Sports Association (IMSA). The race was held at Lime Rock Park in Lakeville, Connecticut, on July 21, 2018. The race was the eighth round of the 2018 IMSA SportsCar Championship.

== Background ==
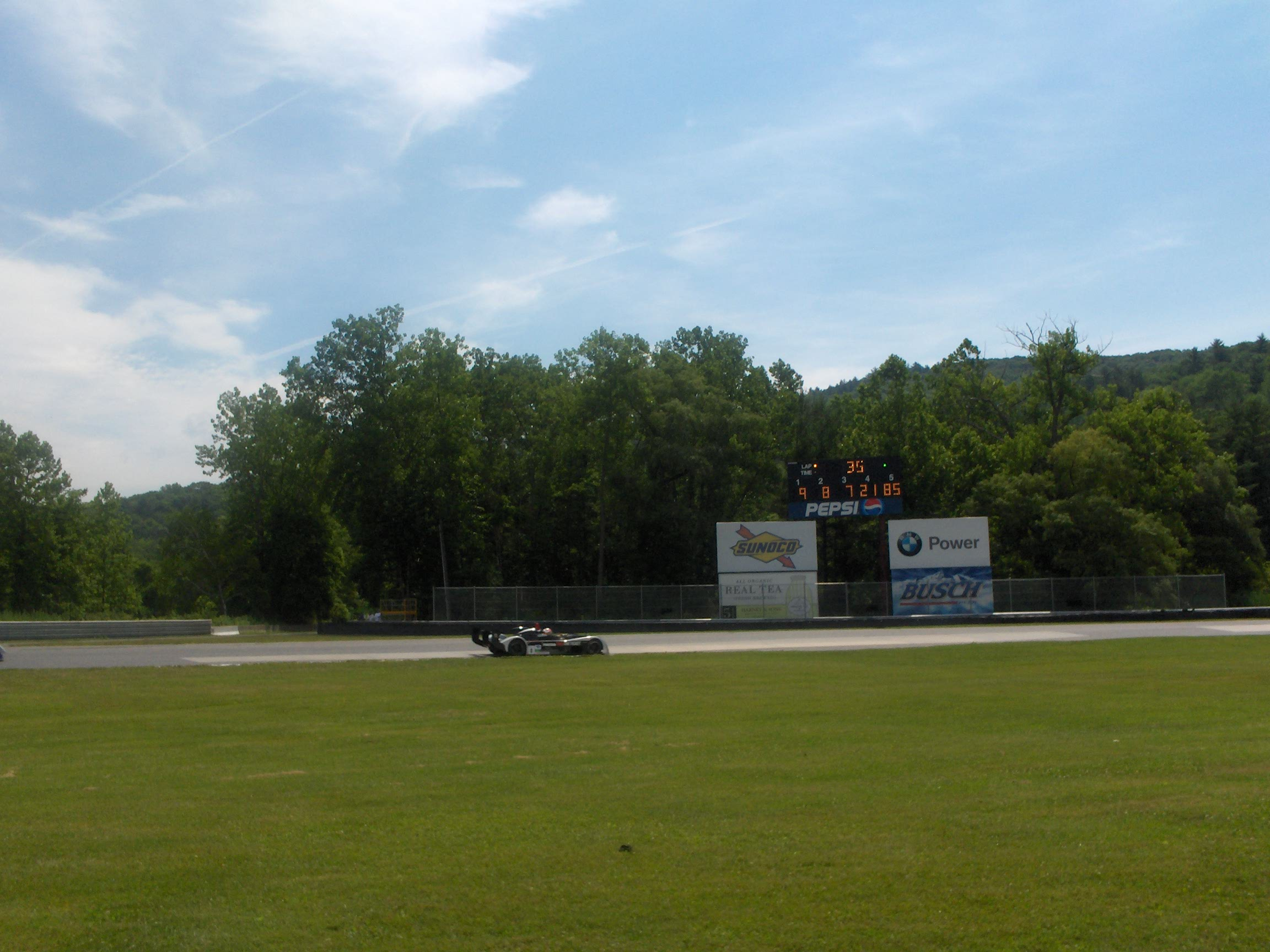
Lime Rock Park, where the race was held.

International Motor Sports Association's (IMSA) president Scott Atherton confirmed the race was part of the schedule for the 2018 IMSA SportsCar Championship (IMSA SCC) in August 2017. It was the fourth consecutive year the event was held as part of the WeatherTech SportsCar Championship and the twenty-seventh annual running of the race. The 2018 Northeast Grand Prix was the eighth of twelve scheduled sports car races of 2018 by IMSA, and was the fifth round not held on the held as part of the North American Endurance Cup. The race was held at the seven-turn 1.530 mi (2.462 km) Lime Rock Park on July 21, 2018. The race was the first of two GT-only rounds on the 2018 IMSA calendar, in which the prototype class, Prototype (P), would not be taking part.

After the SportsCar Grand Prix 1 week earlier, Ryan Briscoe and Richard Westbrook led the GTLM Drivers' Championship with 181 points, ahead of Antonio García and Jan Magnussen with 175 points, and Joey Hand and Dirk Müller with 173 points. In GTD, the Drivers' Championship was led by Bryan Sellers and Madison Snow with 183 points, ahead of Katherine Legge with 180 points. Ford and Lamborghini were leading their respective Manufacturers' Championships, while the #67 Ford Chip Ganassi Racing led the GTLM Teams' Championship. Paul Miller Racing were leading the GTD Teams' Championship.

On July 12, 2018, IMSA issued the latest technical bulletin outlining Balance of Performance for the event. In GTLM, The BMW M8 GTE received an increase in turbo boost and a fuel capacity increase of one liter. In GTD, the Lexus RC F GT3 and Mercedes AMG GT3 were given weight increases of 15 and 10 kilograms, respectively.

== Entries ==
A total of 18 cars took part in the event split across 2 classes. 8 cars were entered in GTLM, and 10 in GTD. In GTD, Wright Motorsports withdrew its #16 entry after Michael Schein had a scheduling conflict. Mario Farnbacher replaced David Heinemeier Hansson in the #15 3GT Racing entry. Gunnar Jeannette returned to the #63 Scuderia Corsa entry.

== Practice ==
There were three practice sessions preceding the start of the race on Saturday, all three on Friday. The first one-hour session was on Friday morning while the second and third sessions were on Friday afternoon.

=== Practice 1 ===
The first practice session took place at 11:25 am ET on Friday and ended with Dirk Müller topping the charts for Ford Chip Ganassi Racing, with a lap time of 50.924.

Pos.	Class	No.	Team	Driver	Time	Gap
1	GTLM	66	Ford Chip Ganassi Racing	Dirk Müller	50.924	_
2	GTLM	911	Porsche GT Team	Nick Tandy	51.021	+0.097
3	GTLM	67	Ford Chip Ganassi Racing	Ryan Briscoe	51.080	+0.156

=== Practice 2 ===
The second practice session took place at 1:55 pm ET on Friday and ended with Antonio García topping the charts for Corvette Racing, with a lap time of 50.939.

Pos.	Class	No.	Team	Driver	Time	Gap
1	GTLM	3	Corvette Racing	Antonio García	50.939	_
2	GTLM	66	Ford Chip Ganassi Racing	Joey Hand	51.001	+0.062
3	GTLM	912	Porsche GT Team	Laurens Vanthoor	51.118	+0.179

=== Practice 3 ===
The third and final practice session took place at 4:55 pm ET on Friday and ended with Nick Tandy topping the charts for Porsche GT Team, with a lap time of 50.414.

Pos.	Class	No.	Team	Driver	Time	Gap
1	GTLM	911	Porsche GT Team	Nick Tandy	50.414	_
2	GTLM	66	Ford Chip Ganassi Racing	Dirk Müller	50.879	+0.465
3	GTLM	24	BMW Team RLL	Jesse Krohn	50.934	+0.520

== Qualifying ==
Saturday morning's 40-minute qualifying session was divided into two groups. Both categories had 15-minute individual sessions, and regulations stipulated teams to nominate a single driver to qualify their cars. The competitors' fastest lap times determined the starting order with the grid arranged to put the GTLM cars ahead of all GTD entries.

=== Qualifying results ===
Pole positions in each class are indicated in bold and by ‡.

Pos.	Class	No.	Team	Driver	Time	Gap	Grid
1	**GTLM**	**3**	(United States) Corvette Racing	**(Spain) Antonio García**	**49.754**	**_**	1‡
2	GTLM	912	(United States) Porsche GT Team	(Belgium) Laurens Vanthoor	49.920	+0.166	2
3	GTLM	66	(United States) Ford Chip Ganassi Racing	(Germany) Dirk Müller	49.945	+0.191	3
4	GTLM	4	(United States) Corvette Racing	(United States) Tommy Milner	50.048	+0.294	4
5	GTLM	67	(United States) Ford Chip Ganassi Racing	(Australia) Ryan Briscoe	50.106	+0.352	5
6	GTLM	24	(United States) BMW Team RLL	(United States) John Edwards	50.285	+0.531	6
7	GTLM	25	(United States) BMW Team RLL	(United States) Connor De Phillippi	50.385	+0.631	7
8	GTLM	911	(United States) Porsche GT Team	(France) Patrick Pilet	50.656	+0.902	8
9	**GTD**	**58**	**(United States) Wright Motorsports**	**(United States) Patrick Long**	**51.491**	**+1.737**	9‡
10	GTD	14	(United States) 3GT Racing	(Austria) Dominik Baumann	51.628	+1.874	10
11	GTD	15	(United States) 3GT Racing	(United Kingdom) Jack Hawksworth	51.705	+1.951	11
12	GTD	48	(United States) Paul Miller Racing	(United States) Bryan Sellers	51.838	+2.084	12
13	GTD	63	(United States) Scuderia Corsa	(United States) Cooper MacNeil	51.848	+2.094	13
14	GTD	96	(United States) Turner Motorsport	(United States) Bill Auberlen	51.884	+2.130	14
15	GTD	93	(United States) Meyer Shank Racing with Curb-Agajanin	(United States) Lawson Aschenbach	51.989	+2.235	15
16	GTD	33	(United States) Mercedes-AMG Team Riley Motorsport	(United States) Ben Keating	51.989	+2.235	18^{1}
17	GTD	86	(United States) Meyer Shank Racing with Curb-Agajanin	(United Kingdom) Katherine Legge	52.137	+2.383	16
18	GTD	44	(United States) Magnus Racing	(United States) John Potter	52.680	+2.926	17
Sources:

- ^{1} The No. 33 Mercedes-AMG Team Riley Motorsport entry was moved to the back of the GTD field after the team elected to change tires after qualifying.

== Race ==
=== Post-race ===
As a result of winning the race, Hand and Müller took the lead of the GTLM Drivers' Championship. Briscoe and Westbrook dropped from first to third while Bamber and Vanthoor advanced from fifth to fourth. The result kept Sellers and Snow atop the GTD Drivers' Championship with 218 points, 10 points ahead of Legge. Ford, and Lamborghini continued to top their respective Manufacturers' Championships while Paul Miller Racing kept their advantage in the GTD Teams' Championship. The #66 Ford Chip Ganassi Racing entry took the lead of the GTLM Teams' Championship with four rounds remaining.

=== Results ===
Class winners are denoted in bold and ‡.

Final race classification
Pos	Class	No.	Team	Drivers	Chassis	Tire	Laps	Time/Retired
Pos	Class	No.	Team	Drivers	Engine	Tire	Laps	Time/Retired
1	**GTLM**	**66**	**(United States) Ford Chip Ganassi Racing**	**(United States) Joey Hand (Germany) Dirk Müller**	**Ford GT**	MI	**178**	**2:40.12.527‡**
1	**GTLM**	**66**	**(United States) Ford Chip Ganassi Racing**	**(United States) Joey Hand (Germany) Dirk Müller**	**Ford EcoBoost 3.5 L Turbo V6**	MI	**178**	**2:40.12.527‡**
2	GTLM	3	(United States) Corvette Racing	(Spain) Antonio García (Denmark) Jan Magnussen	Chevrolet Corvette C7.R	MI	178	+11.431
2	GTLM	3	(United States) Corvette Racing	(Spain) Antonio García (Denmark) Jan Magnussen	Chevrolet LT5.5 5.5 L V8	MI	178	+11.431
3	GTLM	912	(United States) Porsche GT Team	(New Zealand) Earl Bamber (Belgium) Laurens Vanthoor	Porsche 911 RSR	MI	178	+13.601
3	GTLM	912	(United States) Porsche GT Team	(New Zealand) Earl Bamber (Belgium) Laurens Vanthoor	Porsche 4.0 L Flat-6	MI	178	+13.601
4	GTLM	4	(United States) Corvette Racing	(United Kingdom) Oliver Gavin (United States) Tommy Milner	Chevrolet Corvette C7.R	MI	178	+37.964
4	GTLM	4	(United States) Corvette Racing	(United Kingdom) Oliver Gavin (United States) Tommy Milner	Chevrolet LT5.5 5.5 L V8	MI	178	+37.964
5	GTLM	911	(United States) Porsche GT Team	(France) Patrick Pilet (United Kingdom) Nick Tandy	Porsche 911 RSR	MI	178	+40.949
5	GTLM	911	(United States) Porsche GT Team	(France) Patrick Pilet (United Kingdom) Nick Tandy	Porsche 4.0 L Flat-6	MI	178	+40.949
6	GTLM	67	(United States) Ford Chip Ganassi Racing	(Australia) Ryan Briscoe (United Kingdom) Richard Westbrook	Ford GT	MI	178	+45.063
6	GTLM	67	(United States) Ford Chip Ganassi Racing	(Australia) Ryan Briscoe (United Kingdom) Richard Westbrook	Ford EcoBoost 3.5 L Turbo V6	MI	178	+45.063
7	GTLM	25	(United States) BMW Team RLL	(United States) Connor De Phillippi (United Kingdom) Alexander Sims	BMW M8 GTE	MI	176	+2 Laps
7	GTLM	25	(United States) BMW Team RLL	(United States) Connor De Phillippi (United Kingdom) Alexander Sims	BMW S63 4.0 L Turbo V8	MI	176	+2 Laps
8	**GTD**	**48**	**(United States) Paul Miller Racing**	**(United States) Bryan Sellers** **(United States) Madison Snow**	**Lamborghini Huracán GT3**	C	**172**	**+6 Laps‡**
8	**GTD**	**48**	**(United States) Paul Miller Racing**	**(United States) Bryan Sellers** **(United States) Madison Snow**	**Lamborghini 5.2 L V10**	C	**172**	**+6 Laps‡**
9	GTD	44	(United States) Magnus Racing	(United States) John Potter (United States) Andy Lally	Audi R8 LMS	C	172	+6 Laps
9	GTD	44	(United States) Magnus Racing	(United States) John Potter (United States) Andy Lally	Audi 5.2L V10	C	172	+6 Laps
10	GTD	63	(United States) Scuderia Corsa	(United States) Cooper MacNeil (United States) Gunnar Jeannette	Ferrari 488 GT3	C	172	+6 Laps
10	GTD	63	(United States) Scuderia Corsa	(United States) Cooper MacNeil (United States) Gunnar Jeannette	Ferrari F154CB 3.9 L Turbo V8	C	172	+6 Laps
11	GTD	86	(United States) Meyer Shank Racing with Curb-Agajanin	(United Kingdom) Katherine Legge (Portugal) Álvaro Parente	Acura NSX GT3	C	172	+6 Laps
11	GTD	86	(United States) Meyer Shank Racing with Curb-Agajanin	(United Kingdom) Katherine Legge (Portugal) Álvaro Parente	Acura 3.5 L Turbo V6	C	172	+6 Laps
12	GTD	15	(United States) 3GT Racing	(United Kingdom) Jack Hawksworth (Germany) Mario Farnbacher	Lexus RC F GT3	C	172	+6 Laps
12	GTD	15	(United States) 3GT Racing	(United Kingdom) Jack Hawksworth (Germany) Mario Farnbacher	Lexus 5.0L V8	C	172	+6 Laps
13	GTD	33	(United States) Mercedes-AMG Team Riley Motorsport	(Netherlands) Jeroen Bleekemolen (United States) Ben Keating	Mercedes AMG GT3	C	171	+7 Laps
13	GTD	33	(United States) Mercedes-AMG Team Riley Motorsport	(Netherlands) Jeroen Bleekemolen (United States) Ben Keating	Mercedes-AMG M159 6.2 L V8	C	171	+7 Laps
14	GTD	14	(United States) 3GT Racing	(Austria) Dominik Baumann (Canada) Kyle Marcelli	Lexus RC F GT3	C	171	+7 Laps
14	GTD	14	(United States) 3GT Racing	(Austria) Dominik Baumann (Canada) Kyle Marcelli	Lexus 5.0L V8	C	171	+7 Laps
15	GTD	58	(United States) Wright Motorsports	(United States) Patrick Long (Denmark) Christina Nielsen	Porsche 911 GT3 R	C	171	+7 Laps
15	GTD	58	(United States) Wright Motorsports	(United States) Patrick Long (Denmark) Christina Nielsen	Porsche 4.0 L Flat-6	C	171	+7 Laps
16 DNF	GTLM	24	(United States) BMW Team RLL	(United States) John Edwards (Finland) Jesse Krohn	BMW M8 GTE	MI	129	Did Not Finish
16 DNF	GTLM	24	(United States) BMW Team RLL	(United States) John Edwards (Finland) Jesse Krohn	BMW S63 4.0 L Turbo V8	MI	129	Did Not Finish
17 DNF	GTD	93	(United States) Meyer Shank Racing with Curb-Agajanin	(United States) Justin Marks (United States) Lawson Aschenbach	Acura NSX GT3	C	1	Crash
17 DNF	GTD	93	(United States) Meyer Shank Racing with Curb-Agajanin	(United States) Justin Marks (United States) Lawson Aschenbach	Acura 3.5 L Turbo V6	C	1	Crash
18 DNF	GTD	96	(United States) Turner Motorsport	(United States) Robby Foley (United States) Bill Auberlen	BMW M6 GT3	C	0	Crash
18 DNF	GTD	96	(United States) Turner Motorsport	(United States) Robby Foley (United States) Bill Auberlen	BMW 4.4 L Turbo V8	C	0	Crash

Tyre manufacturers
Key
Symbol	Tyre manufacturer
**C**	Continental
**MI**	Michelin

== Standings after the race ==
Prototype Drivers' Championship standings
Pos.	+/–	Driver	Points
1		(United States) Eric Curran (Brazil) Felipe Nasr	198
2		(Portugal) Filipe Albuquerque	197
3		(United States) Jordan Taylor (Netherlands) Renger van der Zande	188
4		(United States) Jon Bennett (United States) Colin Braun	183
5		(United States) Dane Cameron (Colombia) Juan Pablo Montoya	177

GTLM Drivers' Championship standings
Pos.	+/–	Driver	Points
1	1	(United States) Joey Hand (Germany) Dirk Müller	208
2		(Spain) Antonio García (Denmark) Jan Magnussen	207
3	2	(Australia) Ryan Briscoe (United Kingdom) Richard Westbrook	206
4	1	(New Zealand) Earl Bamber (Belgium) Laurens Vanthoor	197
5	1	(United Kingdom) Oliver Gavin (United States) Tommy Milner	195

GTD Drivers' Championship standings
Pos.	+/–	Driver	Points
1		(United States) Bryan Sellers (United States) Madison Snow	218
2		(United Kingdom) Katherine Legge	208
3		(Netherlands) Jeroen Bleekemolen (United States) Ben Keating	194
4		(United States) Cooper MacNeil	179
5	1	(Portugal) Álvaro Parente	173

- Note: Only the top five positions are included for all sets of standings.

Prototype Teams' Championship standings
Pos.	+/–	Team	Points
1		(United States) No. 31 Whelen Engineering Racing	198
2		(United States) No. 5 Mustang Sampling Racing	197
3	3	(United States) No. 10 Wayne Taylor Racing	188
4		(United States) No. 54 CORE Autosport	183
5		(United States) No. 6 Acura Team Penske	177

GTLM Teams' Championship standings
Pos.	+/–	Team	Points
1	1	(United States) No. 66 Ford Chip Ganassi Racing	208
2		(United States) No. 3 Corvette Racing	207
3	2	(United States) No. 67 Ford Chip Ganassi Racing	206
4	1	(United States) No. 912 Porsche GT Team	197
5	1	(United States) No. 4 Corvette Racing	195

GTD Teams' Championship standings
Pos.	+/–	Team	Points
1		(United States) No. 48 Paul Miller Racing	218
2		(United States) No. 86 Meyer Shank Racing with Curb-Agajanin	208
3		(United States) No. 33 Mercedes-AMG Team Riley Motorsports	194
4		(United States) No. 63 Scuderia Corsa	179
5		(United States) No. 15 3GT Racing	173

- Note: Only the top five positions are included for all sets of standings.

Prototype Manufacturers' Championship standings
Pos.	+/–	Manufacturer	Points
1		(United States) Cadillac	234
2		(United States) Acura	222
3		(Japan) Mazda	210
4		(Japan) Nissan	209

GTLM Manufacturers' Championship standings
Pos.	+/–	Manufacturer	Points
1		(United States) Ford	230
2		(United States) Chevrolet	219
3		(Germany) Porsche	216
4		(Germany) BMW	204
5		(Italy) Ferrari	58

GTD Manufacturers' Championship standings
Pos.	+/–	Manufacturer	Points
1		(Italy) Lamborghini	225
2		(United States) Acura	209
3		(Germany) Mercedes-AMG	200
4		(Japan) Lexus	198
5		(Italy) Ferrari	192

- Note: Only the top five positions are included for all sets of standings.

IMSA SportsCar Championship
Previous race: SportsCar Grand Prix	2018 season	Next race: Continental Tire Road Race Showcase
