= 2017 Northeast Grand Prix =

Sports car race

Track map of Lime Rock Park

The 2017 Northeast Grand Prix was a 2017 sports car race sanctioned by the International Motor Sports Association (IMSA). The race was held at Lime Rock Park in Lakeville, Connecticut on July 22, 2017. The race was the eighth round of the 2017 IMSA SportsCar Championship.

== Background ==
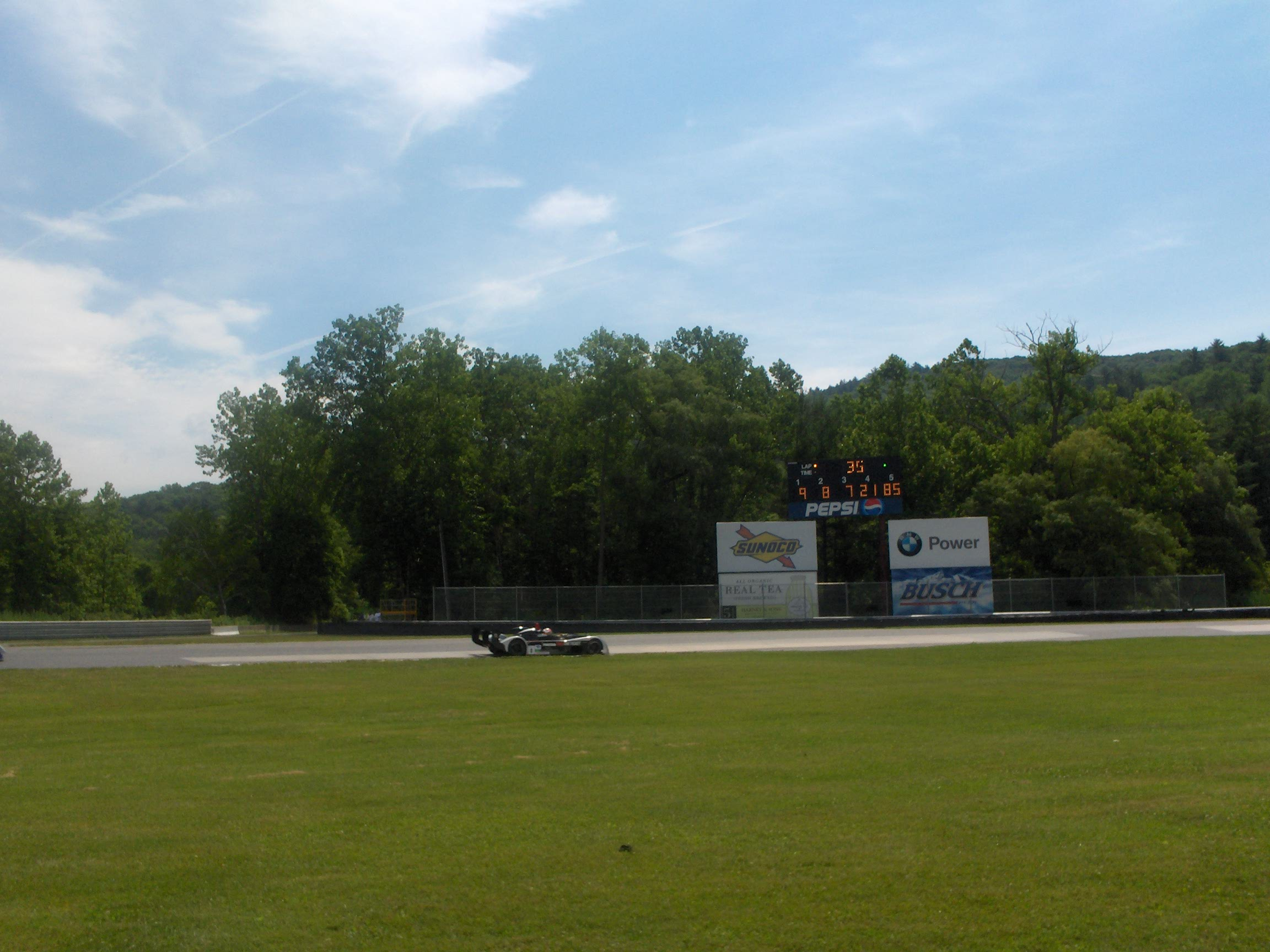
Lime Rock Park, where the race was held.

IMSA's president Scott Atherton confirmed the Northeast Grand Prix was part of the series' schedule for the 2017 IMSA SportsCar Championship at Road America's victory lane in August 2016. It was the third consecutive year the event was held as part of the WeatherTech SportsCar Championship and the twenty-sixth annual running of the race. The 2017 Northeast Grand Prix was the eighth of twelve scheduled sports car races of 2017 by IMSA, and was the fifth round not held on the held as part of the North American Endurance Cup. The race was held at the seven-turn 1.530 mi (2.462 km) Lime Rock Park in Lakeville, Connecticut on July 22, 2017. For the first time since the 2009 running of the event, the PC class would not be competing.

After the Mobil 1 SportsCar Grand Prix one week earlier, Antonio García and Jan Magnussen led the GTLM Drivers' Championship with 182 points, ahead of Bill Auberlen and Alexander Sims with 179 points, and Joey Hand and Dirk Müller with 172 points. In GTD, the Drivers' Championship was led by Alessandro Balzan and Christina Nielsen with 203 points, ahead of Ben Keating and Jeroen Bleekemolen with 195 points. Chevrolet, and Mercedes-AMG were leading their respective Manufacturers' Championships, while Corvette Racing, and Scuderia Corsa each led their own Teams' Championships.

== Entries ==
A total of 25 cars took part in the event split across two classes. 8 cars were entered in GTLM and 17 in GTD. In GTD, Alex Job Racing returned after skipping the previous round at Canadian Tire Motorsport Park. Patrick Long joined Daniel Morad in the Alegra Motorsports entry. TRG made their first appearance since the Circuit of the Americas round. Jesse Krohn joined Jens Klingmann in the Turner Motorsport entry.

== Practice ==
There were two practice sessions preceding the start of the race on Saturday, both on Friday. The two one-hour sessions were on Friday afternoon.

=== Practice 1 ===
The first practice session took place at 12:05 pm ET on Friday and ended with Dirk Müller topping the charts for Ford Chip Ganassi Racing, with a lap time of 51.077. Jörg Bergmeister was fastest in GTD.

Pos.	Class	No.	Team	Driver	Time	Gap
1	GTLM	66	Ford Chip Ganassi Racing	Dirk Müller	51.077	_
2	GTLM	67	Ford Chip Ganassi Racing	Ryan Briscoe	51.268	+0.191
3	GTLM	912	Porsche GT Team	Laurens Vanthoor	51.330	+0.253

=== Practice 2 ===
The second and final practice session took place at 2:25 pm ET on Friday and ended with Gianmaria Bruni topping the charts for Porsche GT Team, with a lap time of 50.601. Madison Snow set the fastest time in GTD.

Pos.	Class	No.	Team	Driver	Time	Gap
1	GTLM	912	Porsche GT Team	Gianmaria Bruni	50.601	_
2	GTLM	66	Ford Chip Ganassi Racing	Dirk Müller	51.030	+0.429
3	GTLM	3	Corvette Racing	Jan Magnussen	51.079	+0.478

== Qualifying ==
Friday afternoon's 40-minute two-group qualifying, each category had separate 15-minute sessions. Regulations stipulated that teams nominate one qualifying driver, with the fastest laps determining each class' starting order. IMSA then arranged the grid to put GTLMs ahead of GTD cars.

Qualifying was broken into two sessions. The first was for cars in GTD class. Madison Snow qualified on pole for the class driving the No. 48 car for Paul Miller Racing.

The final session of qualifying was for the GTLM class. Gianmaria Bruni qualified on pole driving the No. 912 car for Porsche GT Team, besting Ryan Briscoe in the #67 Ford Chip Ganassi Racing entry.

=== Qualifying results ===
Pole positions in each class are indicated in bold and by ‡.

Pos.	Class	No.	Team	Driver	Time	Gap	Grid
1	**GTLM**	**912**	**(United States) Porsche GT Team**	**(Italy) Gianmaria Bruni**	**50.404**	**_**	1‡
2	GTLM	67	(United States) Ford Chip Ganassi Racing	(Australia) Ryan Briscoe	50.540	+0.136	2
3	GTLM	911	(United States) Porsche GT Team	(Germany) Dirk Werner	50.606	+0.202	3
4	GTLM	24	(United States) BMW Team RLL	(United States) John Edwards	50.681	+0.277	4
5	GTLM	4	(United States) Corvette Racing	(United States) Tommy Milner	50.720	+0.316	5
6	GTLM	3	(United States) Corvette Racing	(Denmark) Jan Magnussen	50.730	+0.326	6
7	GTLM	66	(United States) Ford Chip Ganassi Racing	(Germany) Dirk Müller	50.806	+0.402	7
8	GTLM	25	(United States) BMW Team RLL	(United States) Bill Auberlen	50.939	+0.535	8
9	**GTD**	**48**	**(United States) Paul Miller Racing**	**(United States) Madison Snow**	**52.508**	**+2.104**	9‡
10	GTD	54	(United States) CORE Autosport	(United States) Colin Braun	52.699	+2.295	23^{1}
11	GTD	28	(United States) Alegra Motorsports	(United States) Patrick Long	52.836	+2.432	10
12	GTD	15	(United States) 3GT Racing	(United Kingdom) Jack Hawksworth	52.876	+2.472	11
13	GTD	96	(United States) Turner Motorsport	(Germany) Jens Klingmann	52.937	+2.533	12
14	GTD	73	(United States) Park Place Motorsports	(United States) Patrick Lindsey	52.947	+2.543	13
15	GTD	57	(United States) Stevenson Motorsports	(United States) Andrew Davis	52.960	+2.556	14
16	GTD	93	(United States) Michael Shank Racing with Curb Agajanian	(United Kingdom) Katherine Legge	52.961	+2.557	15
17	GTD	63	(United States) Scuderia Corsa	(Denmark) Christina Nielsen	53.010	+2.606	16
18	GTD	007	(United States) TRG	(United States) Brandon Davis	53.107	+2.703	17
19	GTD	14	(United States) 3GT Racing	(United States) Sage Karam	53.140	+2.736	18
20	GTD	33	(United States) Riley Motorsports – Team AMG	(United States) Ben Keating	53.194	+2.790	19
21	GTD	86	(United States) Michael Shank Racing with Curb Agajanian	(Brazil) Oswaldo Negri Jr.	53.197	+2.793	20
22	GTD	16	(United States) Change Racing	(United States) Corey Lewis	53.294	+2.890	21
23	GTD	75	(United States) SunEnergy1 Racing	(Australia) Kenny Habul	53.500	+3.096	25^{2}
24	GTD	50	(United States) Riley Motorsports – WeatherTech Racing	(United States) Cooper MacNeil	53.629	+3.225	22^{3}
25	GTD	23	(United States) Alex Job Racing	(United States) Bill Sweedler	53.998	+3.594	24^{4}
Sources:

- ^{1} The No. 54 CORE Autosport entry was moved to the back of the GTD field as per Articles 43.5 and 43.6 of the Sporting regulations (Change of starting driver) and (Change of starting tires).
- ^{2} The No. 75 SunEnergy1 Racing entry was moved to the back of the GTD field as per Articles 43.5 and 43.6 of the Sporting regulations (Change of starting driver) and (Change of starting tires).
- ^{3} The No. 50 Riley Motorsports – WeatherTech Racing entry was moved to the back of the GTD field as per Article 43.6 of the Sporting regulations (Change of starting tires).
- ^{4} The No. 23 Alex Job Racing entry was moved to the back of the GTD field as per Article 43.6 of the Sporting regulations (Change of starting tires).

== Race ==
=== Post-race ===
The result kept García and Magnussen atop the GTLM Drivers' Championship with 211 points, 7 points ahead of sixth-place finishers Auberlen and Sims. The result kept Balzan and Nielsen atop the GTD Drivers' Championship while Sellers and Snow advanced from sixth to fourth. Chevrolet and Ferrari continued to top their respective Manufacturers' Championships while Corvette Racing, and Scuderia Corsa kept their respective advantages in the Teams' Championships with four rounds left in the season.

=== Results ===
Class winners are denoted in bold and ‡.

Final race classification
Pos	Class	No.	Team	Drivers	Chassis	Tire	Laps	Time/Retired
Pos	Class	No.	Team	Drivers	Engine	Tire	Laps	Time/Retired
1	**GTLM**	**911**	**(United States) Porsche GT Team**	**(France) Patrick Pilet (Germany) Dirk Werner**	**Porsche 911 RSR**	M	**181**	**2:40:18.956‡**
1	**GTLM**	**911**	**(United States) Porsche GT Team**	**(France) Patrick Pilet (Germany) Dirk Werner**	**Porsche 4.0 L Flat-6**	M	**181**	**2:40:18.956‡**
2	GTLM	912	(United States) Porsche GT Team	(Italy) Gianmaria Bruni (Belgium) Laurens Vanthoor	Porsche 911 RSR	M	181	+14.500
2	GTLM	912	(United States) Porsche GT Team	(Italy) Gianmaria Bruni (Belgium) Laurens Vanthoor	Porsche 4.0 L Flat-6	M	181	+14.500
3	GTLM	24	(United States) BMW Team RLL	(United States) John Edwards (Germany) Martin Tomczyk	BMW M6 GTLM	M	181	+39.946
3	GTLM	24	(United States) BMW Team RLL	(United States) John Edwards (Germany) Martin Tomczyk	BMW 4.4 L Turbo V8	M	181	+39.946
4	GTLM	3	(United States) Corvette Racing	(Denmark) Jan Magnussen (Spain) Antonio García	Chevrolet Corvette C7.R	M	181	+40.203
4	GTLM	3	(United States) Corvette Racing	(Denmark) Jan Magnussen (Spain) Antonio García	Chevrolet LT5.5 5.5 L V8	M	181	+40.203
5	GTLM	67	(United States) Ford Chip Ganassi Racing	(Australia) Ryan Briscoe (United Kingdom) Richard Westbrook	Ford GT	M	181	+52.302
5	GTLM	67	(United States) Ford Chip Ganassi Racing	(Australia) Ryan Briscoe (United Kingdom) Richard Westbrook	Ford EcoBoost 3.5 L Twin-turbo V6	M	181	+52.302
6	GTLM	25	(United States) BMW Team RLL	(United States) Bill Auberlen (United Kingdom) Alexander Sims	BMW M6 GTLM	M	180	+1 lap
6	GTLM	25	(United States) BMW Team RLL	(United States) Bill Auberlen (United Kingdom) Alexander Sims	BMW 4.4 L Turbo V8	M	180	+1 lap
7	GTLM	66	(United States) Ford Chip Ganassi Racing	(Germany) Dirk Müller (United States) Joey Hand	Ford GT	M	177	+4 Laps
7	GTLM	66	(United States) Ford Chip Ganassi Racing	(Germany) Dirk Müller (United States) Joey Hand	Ford EcoBoost 3.5 L Twin-turbo V6	M	177	+4 Laps
8	**GTD**	**73**	**(United States) Park Place Motorsports**	**(Germany) Jörg Bergmeister (United States) Patrick Lindsey**	**Porsche 911 GT3 R**	C	**175**	**+6 Laps‡**
8	**GTD**	**73**	**(United States) Park Place Motorsports**	**(Germany) Jörg Bergmeister (United States) Patrick Lindsey**	**Porsche 4.0 L Flat-6**	C	**175**	**+6 Laps‡**
9	GTD	48	(United States) Paul Miller Racing	(United States) Bryan Sellers (United States) Madison Snow	Lamborghini Huracán GT3	M	175	+6 Laps
9	GTD	48	(United States) Paul Miller Racing	(United States) Bryan Sellers (United States) Madison Snow	Lamborghini 5.2 L V10	M	175	+6 Laps
10	GTD	28	(United States) Alegra Motorsports	(United States) Patrick Long (Canada) Daniel Morad	Porsche 911 GT3 R	M	175	+6 Laps
10	GTD	28	(United States) Alegra Motorsports	(United States) Patrick Long (Canada) Daniel Morad	Porsche 4.0 L Flat-6	M	175	+6 Laps
11	GTD	57	(United States) Stevenson Motorsports	(United States) Andrew Davis (United States) Lawson Aschenbach	Audi R8 LMS	M	175	+6 Laps
11	GTD	57	(United States) Stevenson Motorsports	(United States) Andrew Davis (United States) Lawson Aschenbach	Audi 5.2L V10	M	175	+6 Laps
12	GTD	93	(United States) Michael Shank Racing with Curb Agajanian	(United States) Andy Lally (United Kingdom) Katherine Legge	Acura NSX GT3	M	174	+7 Laps
12	GTD	93	(United States) Michael Shank Racing with Curb Agajanian	(United States) Andy Lally (United Kingdom) Katherine Legge	Acura 3.5 L Turbo V6	M	174	+7 Laps
13	GTD	63	(United States) Scuderia Corsa	(Denmark) Christina Nielsen (Italy) Alessandro Balzan	Ferrari 488 GT3	C	174	+7 Laps
13	GTD	63	(United States) Scuderia Corsa	(Denmark) Christina Nielsen (Italy) Alessandro Balzan	Ferrari F154CB 3.9 L Turbo V8	C	174	+7 Laps
14	GTD	15	(United States) 3GT Racing	(United States) Robert Alon (United Kingdom) Jack Hawksworth	Lexus RC F GT3	C	174	+7 Laps
14	GTD	15	(United States) 3GT Racing	(United States) Robert Alon (United Kingdom) Jack Hawksworth	Lexus 5.0L V8	C	174	+7 Laps
15	GTD	23	(United States) Alex Job Racing	(United States) Townsend Bell (United States) Bill Sweedler	Audi R8 LMS	C	173	+8 Laps
15	GTD	23	(United States) Alex Job Racing	(United States) Townsend Bell (United States) Bill Sweedler	Audi 5.2L V10	C	173	+8 Laps
16	GTD	86	(United States) Michael Shank Racing with Curb Agajanian	(United States) Jeff Segal (Brazil) Oswaldo Negri Jr.	Acura NSX GT3	C	173	+8 Laps
16	GTD	86	(United States) Michael Shank Racing with Curb Agajanian	(United States) Jeff Segal (Brazil) Oswaldo Negri Jr.	Acura 3.5 L Turbo V6	C	173	+8 Laps
17	GTD	50	(United States) Riley Motorsports – WeatherTech Racing	(United States) Cooper MacNeil (United States) Gunnar Jeannette	Mercedes-AMG GT3	C	173	+8 Laps
17	GTD	50	(United States) Riley Motorsports – WeatherTech Racing	(United States) Cooper MacNeil (United States) Gunnar Jeannette	Mercedes AMG M159 6.2 L V8	C	173	+8 Laps
18	GTD	16	(United States) Change Racing	(United States) Corey Lewis (Netherlands) Jeroen Mul	Lamborghini Huracán GT3	C	173	+8 Laps
18	GTD	16	(United States) Change Racing	(United States) Corey Lewis (Netherlands) Jeroen Mul	Lamborghini 5.2 L V10	C	173	+8 Laps
19	GTD	14	(United States) 3GT Racing	(United States) Scott Pruett (United States) Sage Karam	Lexus RC F GT3	C	171	+10 Laps
19	GTD	14	(United States) 3GT Racing	(United States) Scott Pruett (United States) Sage Karam	Lexus 5.0L V8	C	171	+10 Laps
20 DNF	GTD	007	(United States) TRG	(United States) Brandon Davis (Australia) James Davison	Aston Martin V12 Vantage GT3	C	164	Lost Power
20 DNF	GTD	007	(United States) TRG	(United States) Brandon Davis (Australia) James Davison	Aston Martin 6.0 L V12	C	164	Lost Power
21	GTD	96	(United States) Turner Motorsport	(Germany) Jens Klingmann (Finland) Jesse Krohn	BMW M6 GT3	C	163	+18 Laps
21	GTD	96	(United States) Turner Motorsport	(Germany) Jens Klingmann (Finland) Jesse Krohn	BMW 4.4L Turbo V8	C	163	+18 Laps
22	GTLM	4	(United States) Corvette Racing	(United Kingdom) Oliver Gavin (United States) Tommy Milner	Chevrolet Corvette C7.R	M	151	+30 Laps
22	GTLM	4	(United States) Corvette Racing	(United Kingdom) Oliver Gavin (United States) Tommy Milner	Chevrolet LT5.5 5.5 L V8	M	151	+30 Laps
23 DNF	GTD	33	(United States) Riley Motorsports – Team AMG	(Netherlands) Jeroen Bleekemolen (United States) Ben Keating	Mercedes-AMG GT3	C	125	Suspension
23 DNF	GTD	33	(United States) Riley Motorsports – Team AMG	(Netherlands) Jeroen Bleekemolen (United States) Ben Keating	Mercedes AMG M159 6.2 L V8	C	125	Suspension
24 DNF	GTD	75	(United States) SunEnergy1 Racing	(France) Tristan Vautier (Australia) Kenny Habul	Mercedes-AMG GT3	C	69	Shock Absorber
24 DNF	GTD	75	(United States) SunEnergy1 Racing	(France) Tristan Vautier (Australia) Kenny Habul	Mercedes AMG M159 6.2 L V8	C	69	Shock Absorber
25 DNF	GTD	54	(United States) CORE Autosport	(United States) Jon Bennett (United States) Colin Braun	Porsche 911 GT3 R	C	39	Engine
25 DNF	GTD	54	(United States) CORE Autosport	(United States) Jon Bennett (United States) Colin Braun	Porsche 4.0 L Flat-6	C	39	Engine

Tyre manufacturers
Key
Symbol	Tyre manufacturer
**C**	Continental
**M**	Michelin

== Standings after the race ==
Prototype Drivers' Championship standings
Pos.	+/–	Driver	Points
1		(United States) Jordan Taylor (United States) Ricky Taylor	226
2		(Portugal) João Barbosa (Brazil) Christian Fittipaldi	207
3		(Canada) Misha Goikhberg (South Africa) Stephen Simpson	200
4		(United States) Dane Cameron (United States) Eric Curran	199
5		(United Kingdom) Ryan Dalziel (United States) Scott Sharp	183

PC Drivers' Championship standings
Pos.	+/–	Driver	Points
1		(United States) James French (Mexico) Patricio O'Ward	216
2		(United States) Don Yount	182
3		(United States) Buddy Rice	120
4		(United States) Kyle Masson	108
5		(Colombia) Gustavo Yacamán	89

GTLM Drivers' Championship standings
Pos.	+/–	Driver	Points
1		(Spain) Antonio García (Denmark) Jan Magnussen	211
2		(United States) Bill Auberlen (United Kingdom) Alexander Sims	204
3		(United States) Joey Hand (Germany) Dirk Müller	196
4		(Australia) Ryan Briscoe (United Kingdom) Richard Westbrook	195
5		(France) Patrick Pilet (Germany) Dirk Werner	194

GTD Drivers' Championship standings
Pos.	+/–	Driver	Points
1		(Italy) Alessandro Balzan (Denmark) Christina Nielsen	228
2		(Netherlands) Jeroen Bleekemolen (United States) Ben Keating	211
3		(United States) Andy Lally (United Kingdom) Katherine Legge	205
4	2	(United States) Bryan Sellers (United States) Madison Snow	197
5		(United States) Lawson Aschenbach (United States) Andrew Davis	195

- Note: Only the top five positions are included for all sets of standings.

Prototype Teams' Championship standings
Pos.	+/–	Team	Points
1		(United States) #10 Wayne Taylor Racing	226
2		(United States) #5 Mustang Sampling Racing	207
3		(United States) #85 JDC-Miller MotorSports	200
4		(United States) #31 Whelen Engineering Racing	199
5		(United States) #2 Tequila Patrón ESM	183

PC Teams' Championship standings
Pos.	+/–	Team	Points
1		(United States) #38 Performance Tech Motorsports	216
2		(United States) #26 BAR1 Motorsports	185
3		(United States) #20 BAR1 Motorsports	182
4		(United States) #8 Starworks Motorsport	58
5		(United States) #88 Starworks Motorsport	28

GTLM Teams' Championship standings
Pos.	+/–	Team	Points
1		(United States) #3 Corvette Racing	211
2		(United States) #25 BMW Team RLL	204
3		(United States) #66 Ford Chip Ganassi Racing	196
4		(United States) #67 Ford Chip Ganassi Racing	195
5		(United States) #911 Porsche GT Team	194

GTD Teams' Championship standings
Pos.	+/–	Team	Points
1		(United States) #63 Scuderia Corsa	228
2		(United States) #33 Riley Motorsports Team AMG	211
3		(United States) #93 Michael Shank Racing with Curb-Agajanian	205
4	2	(United States) #48 Paul Miller Racing	197
5		(United States) #57 Stevenson Motorsports	195

- Note: Only the top five positions are included for all sets of standings.

Prototype Manufacturers' Championship standings
Pos.	+/–	Manufacturer	Points
1		(United States) Cadillac	245
2		(Japan) Nissan	218
3		(Japan) Mazda	216

GTLM Manufacturers' Championship standings
Pos.	+/–	Manufacturer	Points
1		(United States) Chevrolet	223
2		(United States) Ford	219
3		(Germany) BMW	216
4		(Germany) Porsche	209
5		(Italy) Ferrari	112

GTD Manufacturers' Championship standings
Pos.	+/–	Manufacturer	Points
1		(Italy) Ferrari	238
2		(Germany) Mercedes-AMG	235
3		(Japan) Acura	232
4	1	(Germany) Porsche	225
5	1	(Germany) Audi	221

- Note: Only the top five positions are included for all sets of standings.

IMSA SportsCar Championship
Previous race: Mobil 1 SportsCar Grand Prix	2017 season	Next race: Continental Tire Road Race Showcase
