= 2018 Oak Tree Grand Prix =

Tenth round of the 2018 IMSA SportsCar Championship Season

Track map of VIR

The 2018 Oak Tree Grand Prix was a sports car race sanctioned by the International Motor Sports Association (IMSA). The race was held at Virginia International Raceway in Alton, Virginia on August 19, 2018. The race was the tenth round of the 2018 IMSA SportsCar Championship.

== Background ==
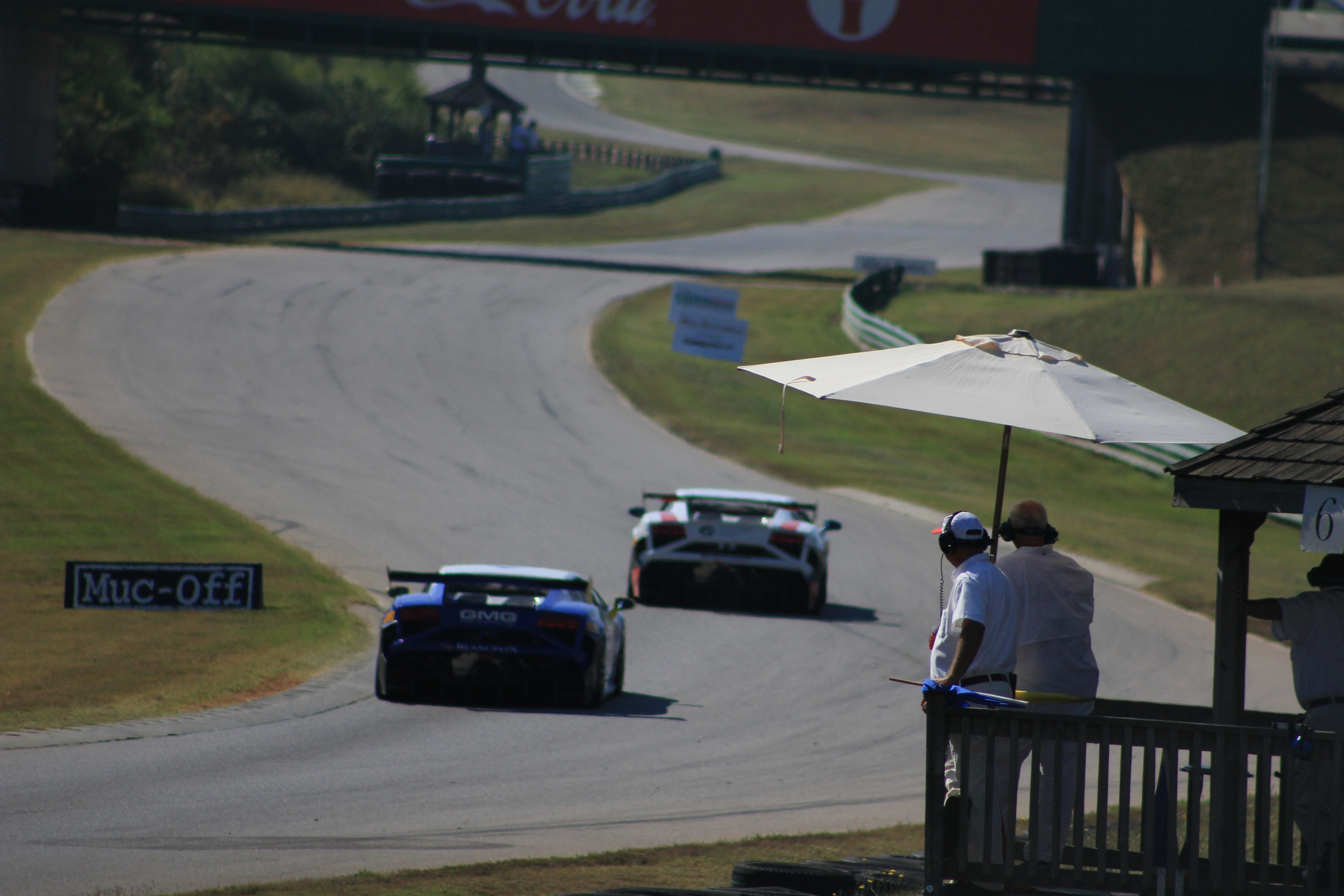
Virginia International Raceway, where the race was held.

International Motor Sports Association's (IMSA) president Scott Atherton confirmed the race was part of the schedule for the 2018 IMSA SportsCar Championship (IMSA SCC) in August 2017. It was the fifth consecutive year the event was held as part of the WeatherTech SportsCar Championship. The 2018 Oak Tree Grand Prix was the tenth of twelve scheduled sports car races of 2018 by IMSA, and was the seventh round not held on the held as part of the North American Endurance Cup. The race was held at the ten-turn 3.270 mi (5.263 km) Virginia International Raceway on August 19, 2018. As in previous years, the event was also the second GT-only round of the IMSA SportsCar Championship season, in which only the GTLM and GTD classes were scheduled to compete.

After the Continental Tire Road Race Showcase 2 weeks earlier, Ryan Briscoe and Richard Westbrook led the GTLM Drivers' Championship with 241 points, ahead Antonio García and Jan Magnussen with 237 points, and Joey Hand and Dirk Müller with 232 points. With 250 points, the GTD Drivers' Championship was led by Bryan Sellers and Madison Snow with an eighteen-point advantage over Katherine Legge with 232 points. Ford and Lamborghini were leading their respective Manufacturers' Championships, while Ford Chip Ganassi Racing and Paul Miller Racing each led their own Teams' Championships.

On August 13, 2018, IMSA issued the latest technical bulletin outlining Balance of Performance for the event. In GTD, the Ferrari 488 GT3 received a reduction in turbo boost and a fuel capacity reduction of 2 liters. No changes were made in GTLM.

=== Entries ===
A total of 18 cars took part in the event split across 2 classes. 8 cars were entered in GTLM, and 10 in GTD. In GTD, Park Place Motorsports and Squadra Corse Garage Italia were absent. Gunnar Jeannette substituted for Alessandro Pier Guidi in the Scuderia Corsa #63 entry due to a clash with the FIA World Endurance Championship round at Silverstone. Mario Farnbacher substituted for Álvaro Parente returned to the Meyer Shank Racing #86 entry.

== Practice ==
There were three practice sessions preceding the start of the race on Sunday, two on Friday and one on Saturday. The first two one-hour sessions were on Friday morning and afternoon. The third on Saturday morning lasted an hour.

=== Practice 1 ===
The first practice session took place at 11:45 am ET on Friday and ended with Richard Westbrook topping the charts for Ford Chip Ganassi Racing, with a lap time of 1:42.627.

Pos.	Class	No.	Team	Driver	Time	Gap
1	GTLM	67	Ford Chip Ganassi Racing	Richard Westbrook	1:42.627	_
2	GTLM	912	Porsche GT Team	Earl Bamber	1:42.761	+0.134
3	GTLM	66	Ford Chip Ganassi Racing	Joey Hand	1:42.793	+0.166

=== Practice 2 ===
The second practice session took place at 4:25 pm ET on Friday and ended with Antonio García topping the charts for Corvette Racing, with a lap time of 1:41.743.

Pos.	Class	No.	Team	Driver	Time	Gap
1	GTLM	3	Corvette Racing	Antonio García	1:41.743	_
2	GTLM	67	Ford Chip Ganassi Racing	Ryan Briscoe	1:42.262	+0.519
3	GTLM	4	Corvette Racing	Tommy Milner	1:42.351	+0.608

=== Practice 3 ===
The third and final practice session took place at 8:35 am ET on Saturday and ended with Tommy Milner topping the charts for Corvette Racing, with a lap time of 1:41.205.

Pos.	Class	No.	Team	Driver	Time	Gap
1	GTLM	4	Corvette Racing	Tommy Milner	1:41.205	_
2	GTLM	25	BMW Team RLL	Connor De Phillippi	1:41.448	+0.243
3	GTLM	912	Porsche GT Team	Earl Bamber	1:41.512	+0.307

== Qualifying ==
Saturday afternoon's 40-minute qualifying session was divided into two groups. Both categories had 15-minute individual sessions, and regulations stipulated teams to nominate a single driver to qualify their cars. The competitors' fastest lap times determined the starting order with the grid arranged to put the GTLM cars ahead of all GTD entries.

=== Qualifying results ===
Pole positions in each class are indicated in bold and by ‡.

Pos.	Class	No.	Team	Driver	Time	Gap	Grid
1	**GTD**	15	**(United States) 3GT Racing**	**(United Kingdom) Jack Hawksworth**	**1:44.107**	**_**	9‡
2	GTD	33	(United States) Mercedes-AMG Team Riley Motorsport	(Netherlands) Jeroen Bleekemolen	1:44.323	+0.216	10
3	GTD	96	(United States) Turner Motorsport	(United States) Bill Auberlen	1:44.360	+0.253	11
4	GTD	14	(United States) 3GT Racing	(Canada) Kyle Marcelli	1:44.516	+0.409	12
5	GTD	48	(United States) Paul Miller Racing	(United States) Madison Snow	1:44.626	+0.519	13
6	GTD	58	(United States) Wright Motorsports	(United States) Patrick Long	1:44.758	+0.651	14
7	GTD	93	(United States) Meyer Shank Racing with Curb-Agajanin	(United States) Lawson Aschenbach	1:44.797	+0.690	17^{1}
8	GTD	86	(United States) Meyer Shank Racing with Curb-Agajanin	(Germany) Mario Farnbacher	1:44.954	+0.847	16
9	GTD	63	(United States) Scuderia Corsa	(United States) Cooper MacNeil	1:45.506	+1.399	18^{2}
10	GTD	44	(United States) Magnus Racing	(United States) John Potter	1:45.918	+1.811	16^{3}
11	**GTLM**	**67**	**(United States) Ford Chip Ganassi Racing**	**(Australia) Ryan Briscoe**	**1:55.580**	**+11.473**	1‡
12	GTLM	911	(United States) Porsche GT Team	(France) Patrick Pilet	1:56.170	+12.063	2
13	GTLM	24	(United States) BMW Team RLL	(United States) John Edwards	1:56.185	+12.078	3
14	GTLM	3	(United States) Corvette Racing	(Spain) Antonio García	1:56.760	+12.653	4
15	GTLM	25	(United States) BMW Team RLL	(United States) Connor De Phillippi	1:57.148	+13.041	5
16	GTLM	66	(United States) Ford Chip Ganassi Racing	(United States) Joey Hand	1:57.202	+13.095	6
17	GTLM	4	(United States) Corvette Racing	(United States) Tommy Milner	1:57.492	+13.385	7
18	GTLM	912	(United States) Porsche GT Team	(New Zealand) Earl Bamber	1:57.874	+13.767	8
Sources:

- ^{1} The No. 93 Meyer Shank Racing with Curb-Agajanin entry was moved to the back of the GTD field as per Article 43.5 of the Sporting regulations (Change of starting driver).
- ^{2} The No. 63 Scuderia Corsa entry was moved to the back of the GTD field as per Article 43.6 of the Sporting regulations (Change of starting tires).
- ^{3} The No. 44 Magnus Racing entry was moved to the back of the GTD field as per Article 43.6 of the Sporting regulations (Change of starting tires).

== Race ==
=== Post-race ===
By finishing second place in the race, García and Magnussen took the lead of the GTLM Drivers' Championship. The result kept Sellers and Snow atop the GTD Drivers' Championship with 275 points, 13 points ahead of Legge. Ford and Lamborghini continued to top their respective Manufacturers' Championships while Corvette Racing took the lead of the GTLM Teams' Championship. Paul Miller Racing kept their advantage in the GTD Teams' Championship with two rounds remaining.

=== Results ===
Class winners are denoted in bold and ‡.

Final race classification
Pos	Class	No.	Team	Drivers	Chassis	Tire	Laps	Time/Retired
Pos	Class	No.	Team	Drivers	Engine	Tire	Laps	Time/Retired
1	**GTLM**	**25**	**(United States)** BMW Team RLL	**(United States)** Connor De Phillippi **(United Kingdom)** Alexander Sims	**BMW M8 GTE**	MI	**88**	**2:40.52.276‡**
1	**GTLM**	**25**	**(United States)** BMW Team RLL	**(United States)** Connor De Phillippi **(United Kingdom)** Alexander Sims	**BMW S63** **4.0 L Turbo V8**	MI	**88**	**2:40.52.276‡**
2	GTLM	3	(United States) Corvette Racing	(Spain) Antonio García (Denmark) Jan Magnussen	Chevrolet Corvette C7.R	MI	88	+1.323
2	GTLM	3	(United States) Corvette Racing	(Spain) Antonio García (Denmark) Jan Magnussen	Chevrolet LT5.5 5.5 L V8	MI	88	+1.323
3	GTLM	24	(United States) BMW Team RLL	(United States) John Edwards (Finland) Jesse Krohn	BMW M8 GTE	MI	88	+2.116
3	GTLM	24	(United States) BMW Team RLL	(United States) John Edwards (Finland) Jesse Krohn	BMW S63 4.0 L Turbo V8	MI	88	+2.116
4	GTLM	66	(United States) Ford Chip Ganassi Racing	(United States) Joey Hand (Germany) Dirk Müller	Ford GT	MI	88	+30.907
4	GTLM	66	(United States) Ford Chip Ganassi Racing	(United States) Joey Hand (Germany) Dirk Müller	Ford EcoBoost 3.5 L Turbo V6	MI	88	+30.907
5	GTLM	912	(United States) Porsche GT Team	(New Zealand) Earl Bamber (Belgium) Laurens Vanthoor	Porsche 911 RSR	MI	88	+35.530
5	GTLM	912	(United States) Porsche GT Team	(New Zealand) Earl Bamber (Belgium) Laurens Vanthoor	Porsche 4.0 L Flat-6	MI	88	+35.530
6	GTLM	4	(United States) Corvette Racing	(United Kingdom) Oliver Gavin (United States) Tommy Milner	Chevrolet Corvette C7.R	MI	88	+36.345
6	GTLM	4	(United States) Corvette Racing	(United Kingdom) Oliver Gavin (United States) Tommy Milner	Chevrolet LT5.5 5.5 L V8	MI	88	+36.345
7	**GTD**	**14**	**(United States) 3GT Racing**	**(Austria) Dominik Baumann** **(Canada) Kyle Marcelli**	**Lexus RC F GT3**	C	**86**	**+2 Laps‡**
7	**GTD**	**14**	**(United States) 3GT Racing**	**(Austria) Dominik Baumann** **(Canada) Kyle Marcelli**	**Lexus** **5.0L V8**	C	**86**	**+2 Laps‡**
8	GTD	58	(United States) Wright Motorsports	(United States) Patrick Long (Denmark) Christina Nielsen	Porsche 911 GT3 R	C	86	+2 Laps
8	GTD	58	(United States) Wright Motorsports	(United States) Patrick Long (Denmark) Christina Nielsen	Porsche 4.0 L Flat-6	C	86	+2 Laps
9	GTD	86	(United States) Meyer Shank Racing with Curb-Agajanin	(United Kingdom) Katherine Legge (Germany) Mario Farnbacher	Acura NSX GT3	C	86	+2 Laps
9	GTD	86	(United States) Meyer Shank Racing with Curb-Agajanin	(United Kingdom) Katherine Legge (Germany) Mario Farnbacher	Acura 3.5 L Turbo V6	C	86	+2 Laps
10	GTD	63	(United States) Scuderia Corsa	(United States) Cooper MacNeil (United States) Gunnar Jeannette	Ferrari 488 GT3	C	86	+2 Laps
10	GTD	63	(United States) Scuderia Corsa	(United States) Cooper MacNeil (United States) Gunnar Jeannette	Ferrari F154CB 3.9 L Turbo V8	C	86	+2 Laps
11	GTD	33	(United States) Mercedes-AMG Team Riley Motorsport	(Netherlands) Jeroen Bleekemolen (United States) Ben Keating	Mercedes AMG GT3	C	86	+2 Laps
11	GTD	33	(United States) Mercedes-AMG Team Riley Motorsport	(Netherlands) Jeroen Bleekemolen (United States) Ben Keating	Mercedes-AMG M159 6.2 L V8	C	86	+2 Laps
12	GTD	48	(United States) Paul Miller Racing	(United States) Bryan Sellers (United States) Madison Snow	Lamborghini Huracán GT3	C	86	+2 Laps
12	GTD	48	(United States) Paul Miller Racing	(United States) Bryan Sellers (United States) Madison Snow	Lamborghini 5.2 L V10	C	86	+2 Laps
13	GTD	44	(United States) Magnus Racing	(United States) John Potter (United States) Andy Lally	Audi R8 LMS GT3	C	86	+2 Laps
13	GTD	44	(United States) Magnus Racing	(United States) John Potter (United States) Andy Lally	Audi 5.2L V10	C	86	+2 Laps
14	GTD	93	(United States) Meyer Shank Racing with Curb-Agajanin	(United States) Justin Marks (United States) Lawson Aschenbach	Acura NSX GT3	C	86	+2 Laps
14	GTD	93	(United States) Meyer Shank Racing with Curb-Agajanin	(United States) Justin Marks (United States) Lawson Aschenbach	Acura 3.5 L Turbo V6	C	86	+2 Laps
15	GTD	96	(United States) Turner Motorsport	(United States) Robby Foley (United States) Bill Auberlen	BMW M6 GT3	C	85	+3 Laps
15	GTD	96	(United States) Turner Motorsport	(United States) Robby Foley (United States) Bill Auberlen	BMW 4.4 L Turbo V8	C	85	+3 Laps
16 (Note: The no. 15 3GT Racing entry was moved to the rear of the GTD classification for not meeting minimum refueling time)	GTD	15	(United States) 3GT Racing	(United Kingdom) Jack Hawksworth (Denmark) David Heinemeier Hansson	Lexus RC F GT3	C	86	+2 Laps
16	GTD	15	(United States) 3GT Racing	(United Kingdom) Jack Hawksworth (Denmark) David Heinemeier Hansson	Lexus 5.0L V8	C	86	+2 Laps
17 DNF	GTLM	911	(United States) Porsche GT Team	(France) Patrick Pilet (United Kingdom) Nick Tandy	Porsche 911 RSR	MI	42	Clutch
17 DNF	GTLM	911	(United States) Porsche GT Team	(France) Patrick Pilet (United Kingdom) Nick Tandy	Porsche 4.0 L Flat-6	MI	42	Clutch
18 DNF	GTLM	67	(United States) Ford Chip Ganassi Racing	(Australia) Ryan Briscoe (United Kingdom) Richard Westbrook	Ford GT	MI	40	Engine
18 DNF	GTLM	67	(United States) Ford Chip Ganassi Racing	(Australia) Ryan Briscoe (United Kingdom) Richard Westbrook	Ford EcoBoost 3.5 L Turbo V6	MI	40	Engine

Tyre manufacturers
Key
Symbol	Tyre manufacturer
**C**	Continental
**MI**	Michelin

== Standings after the race ==
Prototype Drivers' Championship standings
Pos.	+/–	Driver	Points
1		(United States) Eric Curran (Brazil) Felipe Nasr	228
2		(Portugal) Filipe Albuquerque	221
3		(United States) Jon Bennett (United States) Colin Braun	218
4		(United States) Jordan Taylor (Netherlands) Renger van der Zande	216
5		(Canada) Misha Goikhberg (South Africa) Stephen Simpson	206

GTLM Drivers' Championship standings
Pos.	+/–	Driver	Points
1	1	(Spain) Antonio García (Denmark) Jan Magnussen	269
2	1	(Australia) Ryan Briscoe (United Kingdom) Richard Westbrook	265
3		(United States) Joey Hand (Germany) Dirk Müller	260
4		(United Kingdom) Oliver Gavin (United States) Tommy Milner	252
5		(New Zealand) Earl Bamber (Belgium) Laurens Vanthoor	251

GTD Drivers' Championship standings
Pos.	+/–	Driver	Points
1		(United States) Bryan Sellers (United States) Madison Snow	275
2		(United Kingdom) Katherine Legge	262
3		(Netherlands) Jeroen Bleekemolen (United States) Ben Keating	246
4		(United States) Cooper MacNeil	237
5	1	(Austria) Dominik Baumann (Canada) Kyle Marcelli	227

- Note: Only the top five positions are included for all sets of standings.

Prototype Teams' Championship standings
Pos.	+/–	Team	Points
1		(United States) No. 31 Whelen Engineering Racing	228
2		(United States) No. 5 Mustang Sampling Racing	221
3		(United States) No. 54 CORE Autosport	218
4		(United States) No. 10 Wayne Taylor Racing	216
5		(United States) No. 99 JDC-Miller Motorsports	206

GTLM Teams' Championship standings
Pos.	+/–	Team	Points
1	1	(United States) No. 3 Corvette Racing	241
2	1	(United States) No. 67 Ford Chip Ganassi Racing	237
3		(United States) No. 66 Ford Chip Ganassi Racing	232
4		(United States) No. 4 Corvette Racing	227
5		(United States) No. 912 Porsche GT Team	225

GTD Teams' Championship standings
Pos.	+/–	Team	Points
1		(United States) No. 48 Paul Miller Racing	275
2		(United States) No. 86 Meyer Shank Racing with Curb-Agajanin	262
3		(United States) No. 33 Mercedes-AMG Team Riley Motorsports	246
4		(United States) No. 63 Scuderia Corsa	237
5		(United States) No. 14 3GT Racing	227

- Note: Only the top five positions are included for all sets of standings.

Prototype Manufacturers' Championship standings
Pos.	+/–	Manufacturer	Points
1		(United States) Cadillac	269
2		(United States) Acura	254
3		(Japan) Nissan	239
4		(Japan) Mazda	238

GTLM Manufacturers' Championship standings
Pos.	+/–	Manufacturer	Points
1		(United States) Ford	295
2		(United States) Chevrolet	283
3		(Germany) Porsche	274
4		(Germany) BMW	267
5		(Italy) Ferrari	58

GTD Manufacturers' Championship standings
Pos.	+/–	Manufacturer	Points
1		(Italy) Lamborghini	282
2		(United States) Acura	263
3	1	(Japan) Lexus	258
4	1	(Germany) Mercedes-AMG	252
5		(Italy) Ferrari	250

- Note: Only the top five positions are included for all sets of standings.

IMSA SportsCar Championship
Previous race: Continental Tire Road Race Showcase	2018 season	Next race: Monterey Grand Prix
