= 2014 Oak Tree Grand Prix =

Sports Car races

Track map of VIR

The 2014 Oak Tree Grand Prix were a pair of sports car race sanctioned by the International Motor Sports Association (IMSA) held at Virginia International Raceway in Alton, Virginia on August 24, 2014. The events served as the eleventh of thirteen scheduled rounds of the 2014 United SportsCar Championship.

== Background ==
=== Preview ===
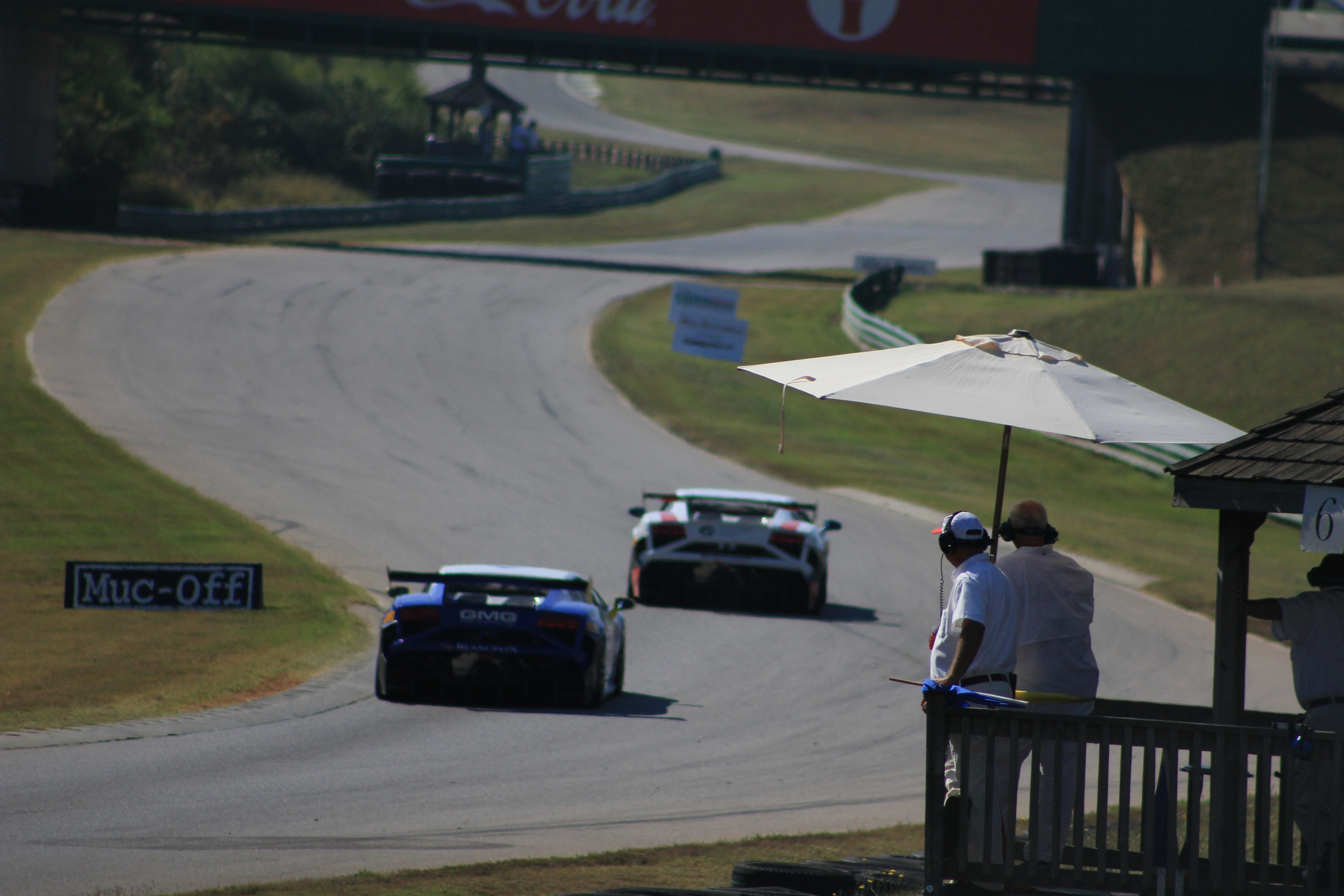
Virginia International Raceway, where the race was held.

International Motor Sports Association (IMSA) president Scott Atherton confirmed that the race was part of the 2014 United SportsCar Championship schedule in October 2013. It was the first year the event was held as part of the Tudor United SportsCar Championship. The 2014 Oak Tree Grand Prix was the eleventh of thirteen scheduled sports car races of 2014 by IMSA, and it was the eighth round not held as part of the North American Endurance Cup. The events were held at the seventeen-turn 3.270 mi (5.263 km) Virginia International Raceway in Alton, Virginia on August 24, 2014. Due to the field size, IMSA would use a doubleheader race format where the Prototype Challenge and Cooper Tires Prototype Lites would participate in the first event in a two-segment race format while the GTLM and GTD classes would participate in the second event.

Before the race, Jon Bennett and Colin Braun led the Prototype Challenge Drivers' Championship with 224 points, 35 points clear of Renger van der Zande in second. With 245 points, GTLM was led by Antonio García and Jan Magnussen with an eight-point advantage over Kuno Wittmer and Jonathan Bomarito. In GTD, the Drivers' Championship was led by Bill Sweedler and Townsend Bell with 220 points; the duo held a three-point gap over Leh Keen and Cooper MacNeil. Chevrolet and Ferrari were leading their respective Manufacturers' Championships, while CORE Autosport, Corvette Racing, and AIM Autosport were their respective Teams' Championships.

=== Entry list ===
Thirty-six cars were officially entered for the Oak Tree Grand Prix, with most of the entries being in the Grand Touring Le Mans (GTLM) and Grand Touring Daytona (GTD) classes. The Prototype Challenge (PC) class was composed of nine Oreca FLM09 cars: two from Starworks Motorsport and RSR Racing. CORE Autosport, JDC-Miller MotorSports, Performance Tech, PR1/Mathiasen Motorsports, and 8Star Motorsports entered one car each. Despite being listed an entry, the No. 88 BAR1 Motorsports car withdrew from the event. GTLM was represented by ten entries from five different brands. In the list of GTD entrants, seventeen GT-specification vehicles were represented by six different manufacturers.

== Practice ==
There were five practice sessions preceding the start of the races on Friday, four on Friday and one on Saturday. The first session on Friday morning lasted 60 minutes while the second on Friday afternoon ran for 30 minutes. The third scheduled for later that afternoon ran for 45 minutes while the fourth session scheduled later that afternoon lasted an hour. The fifth session on Saturday morning lasted 90 minutes.

== Qualifying ==
The first session of the week occurred on Saturday morning in the first of two sessions to set the starting order for the first race with the fastest lap times set by each team's quickest driver. Cars in Cooper Tires Prototype Lites were sent out first before those grouped in PC had one separate identically timed 15 minute session.

The second session occurred on Saturday afternoon to set the starting order for the second race. Cars in GTD were sent out first before those grouped in GTLM in a separate identically 15 minute timed session. Regulations stipulated teams to nominate one qualifying driver, with the fastest laps determining each classes starting order. IMSA would arrange the grid to put all GTLM vehicles ahead of GTD cars.

=== Qualifying results ===
Pole positions in each class are indicated in bold and by ‡. PC stands for Prototype Challenge, GTLM (Grand Touring Le Mans) and GTD (Grand Touring Daytona).

Pos.	Class	No.	Team	Driver	Time	Gap	Grid
1	**PC**	**25**	**(United States) 8Star Motorsports**	**(United States) Sean Rayhall**	**1:41.447**	**_**	1 (1)‡
2	PC	52	(United States) PR1/Mathiasen Motorsports	(United States) Frankie Montecalvo	1:42.552	+1.105	2 (1)
3	PC	09	(United States) RSR Racing	(United States) Duncan Ende	1:42.610	+1.163	3 (1)
4	PC	08	(United States) RSR Racing	(Canada) Chris Cumming	1:42.620	+1.173	4 (1)
5	PC	54	(United States) CORE Autosport	(United States) Jon Bennett	1:43.033	+1.586	5 (1)
6	PC	85	(United States) JDC-Miller MotorSports	(United States) Chris Miller	1:43.617	+2.170	6 (1)
7	PC	38	(United States) Performance Tech	(United States) James French	1:43.651	+2.204	7 (1)
8	**GTLM**	**62**	**(United States) Risi Competizione**	**(Germany) Pierre Kaffer**	**1:43.797**	**+2.350**	1 (2)‡
9	GTLM	55	(United States) BMW Team RLL	(United States) Bill Auberlen	1:44.053	+2.606	2 (2)
10	GTLM	91	(United States) SRT Motorsports	(Belgium) Marc Goossens	1:44.072	+2.625	3 (2)
11	GTLM	56	(United States) BMW Team RLL	(Germany) Dirk Müller	1:44.076	+2.629	4 (2)
12	GTLM	93	(United States) SRT Motorsports	(United States) Jonathan Bomarito	1:44.096	+2.649	5 (2)
13	GTLM	3	(United States) Corvette Racing	(Spain) Antonio García	1:44.105	+2.658	6 (2)
14	GTLM	17	(United States) Team Falken Tire	(United States) Bryan Sellers	1:44.322	+2.875	7 (2)
15	GTLM	912	(United States) Porsche North America	(Denmark) Michael Christensen	1:44.422	+2.975	8 (2)
16	GTLM	4	(United States) Corvette Racing	(United States) Tommy Milner	1:44.812	+3.365	9 (2)
17	PC	8	(United States) Starworks Motorsport	(Germany) Mirco Schultis	1:44.736	+3.289	8 (1)
18	PC	7	(United States) Starworks Motorsport	(Mexico) Martin Fuentes	1:45.247	+3.800	9 (1)
19	**GTD**	**007**	**(United States) TRG-AMR North America**	**(Australia) James Davison**	**1:47.660**	**+6.213**	10 (2)‡
20	GTD	22	(United States) Alex Job Racing	(United States) Leh Keen	1:47.957	+6.510	11 (2)
21	GTD	94	(United States) Turner Motorsport	(United States) Dane Cameron	1:48.043	+6.596	12 (2)
22	GTD	45	(United States) Flying Lizard Motorsports	(United States) Spencer Pumpelly	1:48.173	+6.726	13 (2)
23	GTD	58	(United States) Snow Racing	(Belgium) Jan Heylen	1:48.388	+6.941	14 (2)
24	GTD	23	(United States) Team Seattle/Alex Job Racing	(Germany) Mario Farnbacher	1:48.405	+6.958	15 (2)
25	GTD	44	(United States) Magnus Racing	(United States) Andy Lally	1:48.596	+7.149	16 (2)
26	GTD	46	(United States) Fall-Line Motorsports	(United States) Charles Espenlaub	1:48.653	+7.206	17 (2)
27	GTD	63	(United States) Scuderia Corsa	(Italy) Alessandro Balzan	1:48.692	+7.245	18 (2)
28	GTD	81	(United States) GB Autosport	(Republic of Ireland) Damien Faulkner	1:48.725	+7.278	19 (2)
29	GTD	35	(United States) Flying Lizard Motorsports	(South Africa) Dion von Moltke	1:48.739	+7.292	20 (2)
30	GTD	73	(United States) Park Place Motorsports	(France) Kévin Estre	1:48.771	+7.324	21 (2)
31	GTD	48	(United States) Paul Miller Racing	(Germany) Christopher Haase	1:48.931	+7.484	22 (2)
32	GTD	555	(Canada) AIM Autosport	(United States) Townsend Bell	1:48.988	+7.541	23 (2)
33	GTD	33	(United States) Riley Motorsports	(United States) Tony Ave	1:49.197	+7.750	24 (2)
34	GTD	18	(Belgium) Mühlner Motorsports America	(United States) Mark Kvamme	1:55.663	+14.216	25 (2)
35	GTD	27	(United States) Dempsey Racing	None	No Time Established		26 (2)
36	GTLM	911	(United States) Porsche North America	None	No Time Established		27 (2)

Key	Meaning
**(1)**	Race One
**(2)**	Race Two

== Races ==
=== Race results ===
Class winners are denoted in bold and ‡. PC stands for Prototype Challenge).

Pos	Class	No.	Team	Drivers	Chassis	Tire	Laps	Time/Retired
Pos	Class	No.	Team	Drivers	Engine	Tire	Laps	Time/Retired
1	**PC**	**25**	**(United States) 8Star Motorsports**	**(Mexico) Luis Díaz (United States) Sean Rayhall**	**Oreca FLM09**	C	**47**	**18:09:02.126‡**
1	**PC**	**25**	**(United States) 8Star Motorsports**	**(Mexico) Luis Díaz (United States) Sean Rayhall**	**Chevrolet 6.2 L V8**	C	**47**	**18:09:02.126‡**
2	PC	54	(United States) CORE Autosport	(United States) Jon Bennett (United States) Colin Braun	Oreca FLM09	C	47	+1.220
2	PC	54	(United States) CORE Autosport	(United States) Jon Bennett (United States) Colin Braun	Chevrolet 6.2 L V8	C	47	+1.220
3	PC	8	(United States) Starworks Motorsport	(Germany) Mirco Schultis (Netherlands) Renger van der Zande	Oreca FLM09	C	47	+2.829
3	PC	8	(United States) Starworks Motorsport	(Germany) Mirco Schultis (Netherlands) Renger van der Zande	Chevrolet 6.2 L V8	C	47	+2.829
4	PC	7	(United States) Starworks Motorsport	(Canada) Kyle Marcelli (Mexico) Martin Fuentes	Oreca FLM09	C	47	+3.749
4	PC	7	(United States) Starworks Motorsport	(Canada) Kyle Marcelli (Mexico) Martin Fuentes	Chevrolet 6.2 L V8	C	47	+3.749
5	PC	38	(United States) Performance Tech	(Canada) David Ostella (United States) James French	Oreca FLM09	C	47	+5.634
5	PC	38	(United States) Performance Tech	(Canada) David Ostella (United States) James French	Chevrolet 6.2 L V8	C	47	+5.634
6	PC	52	(United States) PR1/Mathiasen Motorsports	(United States) Gunnar Jeannette (United States) Frankie Montecalvo	Oreca FLM09	C	47	+7.580
6	PC	52	(United States) PR1/Mathiasen Motorsports	(United States) Gunnar Jeannette (United States) Frankie Montecalvo	Chevrolet 6.2 L V8	C	47	+7.580
7	PC	85	(United States) JDC-Miller MotorSports	(United States) Chris Miller	Oreca FLM09	C	47	+8.466
7	PC	85	(United States) JDC-Miller MotorSports	(United States) Chris Miller	Chevrolet 6.2 L V8	C	47	+8.466
8 DNF	PC	09	(United States) RSR Racing	(United States) Duncan Ende (Brazil) Bruno Junqueira	Oreca FLM09	C	44	Did Not Finish
8 DNF	PC	09	(United States) RSR Racing	(United States) Duncan Ende (Brazil) Bruno Junqueira	Chevrolet 6.2 L V8	C	44	Did Not Finish
9 DNF	PC	08	(United States) RSR Racing	(Canada) Chris Cumming (Canada) Alex Tagliani	Oreca FLM09	C	36	Accident
9 DNF	PC	08	(United States) RSR Racing	(Canada) Chris Cumming (Canada) Alex Tagliani	Chevrolet 6.2 L V8	C	36	Accident

Tyre manufacturers
Key
Symbol	Tyre manufacturer
**C**	Continental

=== Race results ===
Class winners are denoted in bold and ‡. GTLM stands for Grand Touring Le Mans and GTD (Grand Touring Daytona).

Pos	Class	No.	Team	Drivers	Chassis	Tire	Laps
Pos	Class	No.	Team	Drivers	Engine	Tire	Laps
1	**GTLM**	**62**	**(United States) Risi Competizione**	**(Italy) Giancarlo Fisichella (Germany) Pierre Kaffer**	**Ferrari 458 Italia GT2**	MI	**82‡**
1	**GTLM**	**62**	**(United States) Risi Competizione**	**(Italy) Giancarlo Fisichella (Germany) Pierre Kaffer**	**Ferrari 4.5 L V8**	MI	**82‡**
2	GTLM	17	(United States) Team Falken Tire	(Germany) Wolf Henzler (United States) Bryan Sellers	Porsche 911 RSR	FAL	82
2	GTLM	17	(United States) Team Falken Tire	(Germany) Wolf Henzler (United States) Bryan Sellers	Porsche 4.0 L Flat-6	FAL	82
3	GTLM	56	(United States) BMW Team RLL	(United States) John Edwards (Germany) Dirk Müller	BMW Z4 GTE	MI	82
3	GTLM	56	(United States) BMW Team RLL	(United States) John Edwards (Germany) Dirk Müller	BMW 4.4 L V8	MI	82
4	GTLM	55	(United States) BMW Team RLL	(United States) Bill Auberlen (United Kingdom) Andy Priaulx	BMW Z4 GTE	MI	82
4	GTLM	55	(United States) BMW Team RLL	(United States) Bill Auberlen (United Kingdom) Andy Priaulx	BMW 4.4 L V8	MI	82
5	GTLM	93	(United States) SRT Motorsports	(United States) Jonathan Bomarito (Canada) Kuno Wittmer (Germany) Dominik Farnbacher	SRT Viper GTS-R	MI	82
5	GTLM	93	(United States) SRT Motorsports	(United States) Jonathan Bomarito (Canada) Kuno Wittmer (Germany) Dominik Farnbacher	SRT 8.0 L V10	MI	82
6	GTLM	91	(United States) SRT Motorsports	(Belgium) Marc Goossens (Germany) Dominik Farnbacher	SRT Viper GTS-R	MI	82
6	GTLM	91	(United States) SRT Motorsports	(Belgium) Marc Goossens (Germany) Dominik Farnbacher	SRT 8.0 L V10	MI	82
7	GTLM	3	(United States) Corvette Racing	(Spain) Antonio García (Denmark) Jan Magnussen (United States) Jordan Taylor	Chevrolet Corvette C7.R	MI	82
7	GTLM	3	(United States) Corvette Racing	(Spain) Antonio García (Denmark) Jan Magnussen (United States) Jordan Taylor	Chevrolet LT5.5 5.5 L V8	MI	82
8	**GTD**	**94**	**(United States) Turner Motorsport**	**(United States) Dane Cameron (Finland) Markus Palttala**	**BMW Z4 GT3**	C	**82‡**
8	**GTD**	**94**	**(United States) Turner Motorsport**	**(United States) Dane Cameron (Finland) Markus Palttala**	**BMW 4.4 L V8**	C	**82‡**
9	GTD	63	(United States) Scuderia Corsa	(Italy) Alessandro Balzan (United States) Jeff Westphal	Ferrari 458 Italia GT3	C	82
9	GTD	63	(United States) Scuderia Corsa	(Italy) Alessandro Balzan (United States) Jeff Westphal	Ferrari 4.5L V8	C	82
10	GTD	27	(United States) Dempsey Racing	(United States) Andrew Davis (United States) Patrick Dempsey	Porsche 911 GT America	C	82
10	GTD	27	(United States) Dempsey Racing	(United States) Andrew Davis (United States) Patrick Dempsey	Porsche 4.0L Flat-6	C	82
11	GTD	48	(United States) Paul Miller Racing	(Germany) Christopher Haase (United States) Bryce Miller	Audi R8 LMS ultra	C	82
11	GTD	48	(United States) Paul Miller Racing	(Germany) Christopher Haase (United States) Bryce Miller	Audi 5.2 L V10	C	82
12	GTD	22	(United States) Alex Job Racing	(United States) Leh Keen (United States) Cooper MacNeil	Porsche 911 GT America	C	82
12	GTD	22	(United States) Alex Job Racing	(United States) Leh Keen (United States) Cooper MacNeil	Porsche 4.0L Flat-6	C	82
13	GTD	44	(United States) Magnus Racing	(United States) Andy Lally (United States) John Potter	Porsche 911 GT America	C	82
13	GTD	44	(United States) Magnus Racing	(United States) Andy Lally (United States) John Potter	Porsche 4.0L Flat-6	C	82
14	GTD	35	(United States) Flying Lizard Motorsports	(South Africa) Dion von Moltke (United States) Spencer Pumpelly	Audi R8 LMS ultra	C	82
14	GTD	35	(United States) Flying Lizard Motorsports	(South Africa) Dion von Moltke (United States) Spencer Pumpelly	Audi 5.2 L V10	C	82
15	GTD	555	(Canada) AIM Autosport	(United States) Townsend Bell (United States) Bill Sweedler	Ferrari 458 Italia GT3	C	82
15	GTD	555	(Canada) AIM Autosport	(United States) Townsend Bell (United States) Bill Sweedler	Ferrari 4.5L V8	C	82
16	GTD	58	(United States) Snow Racing	(Belgium) Jan Heylen (United States) Madison Snow	Porsche 911 GT America	C	82
16	GTD	58	(United States) Snow Racing	(Belgium) Jan Heylen (United States) Madison Snow	Porsche 4.0L Flat-6	C	82
17	GTD	81	(United States) GB Autosport	(United States) Michael Lewis (Republic of Ireland) Damien Faulkner	Porsche 911 GT America	C	82
17	GTD	81	(United States) GB Autosport	(United States) Michael Lewis (Republic of Ireland) Damien Faulkner	Porsche 4.0L Flat-6	C	82
18	GTD	46	(United States) Fall-Line Motorsports	(United States) Charles Espenlaub (United States) Charles Putman (United Kingdom) Marino Franchitti	Audi R8 LMS ultra	C	82
18	GTD	46	(United States) Fall-Line Motorsports	(United States) Charles Espenlaub (United States) Charles Putman (United Kingdom) Marino Franchitti	Audi 5.2 L V10	C	82
19	GTLM	912	(United States) Porsche North America	(United States) Patrick Long (Denmark) Michael Christensen	Porsche 911 RSR	MI	81
19	GTLM	912	(United States) Porsche North America	(United States) Patrick Long (Denmark) Michael Christensen	Porsche 4.0 L Flat-6	MI	81
20	GTD	007	(United States) TRG-AMR North America	(United States) Al Carter (Australia) James Davison	Aston Martin V12 Vantage GT3	C	81
20	GTD	007	(United States) TRG-AMR North America	(United States) Al Carter (Australia) James Davison	Aston Martin 6.0 L V12	C	81
21	GTD	33	(United States) Riley Motorsports	(United States) Ben Keating (United States) Tony Ave	SRT Viper GT3-R	C	80
21	GTD	33	(United States) Riley Motorsports	(United States) Ben Keating (United States) Tony Ave	SRT 8.0 L V10	C	80
22	GTD	18	(Belgium) Mühlner Motorsports America	(United States) Mark Kvamme (United States) Corey Lewis	Porsche 911 GT America	C	79
22	GTD	18	(Belgium) Mühlner Motorsports America	(United States) Mark Kvamme (United States) Corey Lewis	Porsche 4.0L Flat-6	C	79
23	GTLM	4	(United States) Corvette Racing	(United Kingdom) Oliver Gavin (United States) Tommy Milner	Chevrolet Corvette C7.R	MI	78
23	GTLM	4	(United States) Corvette Racing	(United Kingdom) Oliver Gavin (United States) Tommy Milner	Chevrolet LT5.5 5.5 L V8	MI	78
24	GTD	23	(United States) Team Seattle/Alex Job Racing	(Germany) Mario Farnbacher (United Kingdom) Ian James	Porsche 911 GT America	C	73
24	GTD	23	(United States) Team Seattle/Alex Job Racing	(Germany) Mario Farnbacher (United Kingdom) Ian James	Porsche 4.0L Flat-6	C	73
25 DNF	GTLM	911	(United States) Porsche North America	(United Kingdom) Nick Tandy (Austria) Richard Lietz (Denmark) Michael Christensen	Porsche 911 RSR	MI	72
25 DNF	GTLM	911	(United States) Porsche North America	(United Kingdom) Nick Tandy (Austria) Richard Lietz (Denmark) Michael Christensen	Porsche 4.0 L Flat-6	MI	72
26 DNF	GTD	45	(United States) Flying Lizard Motorsports	(Venezuela) Nelson Canache Jr. (United States) Spencer Pumpelly	Audi R8 LMS ultra	C	71
26 DNF	GTD	45	(United States) Flying Lizard Motorsports	(Venezuela) Nelson Canache Jr. (United States) Spencer Pumpelly	Audi 5.2 L V10	C	71
27 DNF	GTD	73	(United States) Park Place Motorsports	(United States) Patrick Lindsey (France) Kévin Estre	Porsche 911 GT America	C	43
27 DNF	GTD	73	(United States) Park Place Motorsports	(United States) Patrick Lindsey (France) Kévin Estre	Porsche 4.0L Flat-6	C	43

Tyre manufacturers
Key
Symbol	Tyre manufacturer
**C**	Continental
**MI**	Michelin
**FAL**	Falken Tire

United SportsCar Championship
Previous race: Continental Tire Road Race Showcase	2014 season	Next race: Lone Star Le Mans
