= Paul Miller Racing =

Racing team

(United States) Paul Miller Racing
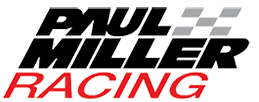
- Current series: IMSA SportsCar Championship
- Current drivers: (United States) Connor De Phillippi (United States) Neil Verhagen (United Kingdom) Dan Harper (Germany) Max Hesse

Paul Miller Racing is an American auto racing team that is part of Paul Miller Auto Group and associated with former racing driver Paul Miller. The team has operations that are headquartered in Buford, Georgia; the Racing team also has operations in Parsippany, New Jersey.

Members of the team include Bryan Sellers and Paul Miller's son Bryce Miller.

The team won the WeatherTech SportsCar Championship in 2018 in the GT Daytona class, running a Lamborghini Huracán GT3.

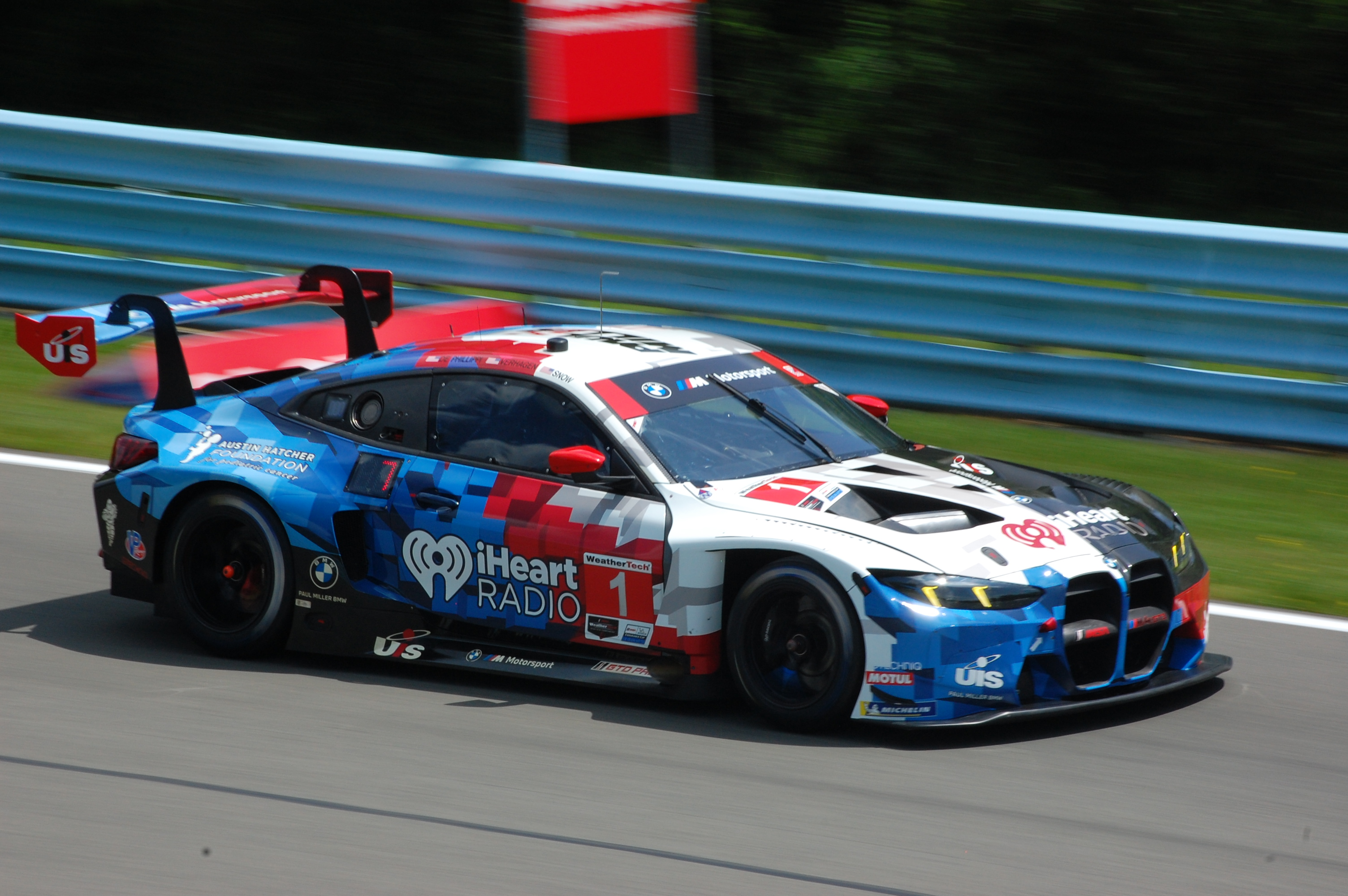
Paul Miller Racing's No. 1 BMW M4 GT3 Evo during the 2025 Sahlen's Six Hours of The Glen

Paul Miller Racing switched to the BMW M4 GT3 for the 2022 WeatherTech SportsCar Championship season and was able to secure a win in their second race with the car.

== Results ==
=== Complete American Le Mans Series results ===
(key) (Races in bold indicate pole position)

Year	Entrant	Class	Make	Engine	No.	Rounds										Rank	Points
Year	Entrant	Class	Make	Engine	No.	1	2	3	4	5	6	7	8	9	10	Rank	Points
2011	Paul Miller Racing	GT	Porsche 911 GT3 RSR	Porsche 4.0 L Flat-6	48	SEB; Ret	LBH; Ret	LRP; 6	MOS; 10	MDO; 8	ELK; 7	BAL; 4	LAG; 10	PET; 11		8th	47
2012	Paul Miller Racing	GT	Porsche 911 GT3 RSR	Porsche 4.0 L Flat-6	48	SEB; 5	LBH; 8	LAG; 10	LRP; 8	MOS; 5	MDO; 9	ELK; 5	BAL; 9	VIR; 10†	PET; 10	6th	55
2013	Paul Miller Racing	GT	Porsche 911 GT3 RSR	Porsche 4.0 L Flat-6	48	SEB; 6	LBH; 6	LAG; 6	LRP; 7	MOS; 9	ELK; 4	BAL; Ret	COA; 9	VIR; Ret	PET; Ret	7th	44

^{†} Did not finish the race but was classified as the car completed more than 70% of the winner's race distance.

=== Complete IMSA WeatherTech SportsCar Championship results ===
(key) (Races in bold indicate pole position)

Year	Entrant	Class	Make	Engine	No.	Rounds												Rank	Points
Year	Entrant	Class	Make	Engine	No.	1	2	3	4	5	6	7	8	9	10	11	12	Rank	Points
2014	Paul Miller Racing	GTD	Audi R8 LMS ultra	Audi DAR 5.2 L V10	48	DAY; 16	SEB; 12	LGA; 2	DET; 3	WGL; 8	MOS; 8	IND; 2	ELK; 11	VIR; 4	COA; 6	PET; 1		2nd	295
2015	Paul Miller Racing	GTD	Audi R8 LMS ultra	Audi DAR 5.2 L V10	48	DAY; 5	SEB; 5	LGA; 2	**BEL**; **3**	**WGL**; **3**	**LIM**; **10**	ELK; 6	**VIR**; **5**	**AUS**; **3**	PET; 10			3rd	277
2016	Paul Miller Racing	GTD	Lamborghini Huracán GT3	Lamborghini DGF 5.2 L V10	48	DAY; 16	SEB; 6	LGA; 7	**DET**; 8	WGL; 12	MOS; 3	LIM; 4	ELK; 8	**VIR**; 1	COA; 2	PET; 4		3rd	293
2017	Paul Miller Racing	GTD	Lamborghini Huracán GT3	Lamborghini DGF 5.2 L V10	48	DAY; 7	SEB; 5	**LBH**; 16	COA; 4	DET; 3	WGL; 12	MOS; 8	**LIM**; 2	ELK; 6	VIR; 5	**LGA**; 7	PET; 7	8th	281
2018	Paul Miller Racing	GTD	Lamborghini Huracán GT3	Lamborghini DGF 5.2 L V10	48	DAY; 3	SEB; 1	MDO; 3	**DET**; 3	WGL; 3	MOS; 4	LIM; 1	ELK; 2	VIR; 6	LGA; 4	PET; 3		1st	333
2019	Paul Miller Racing	GTD	Lamborghini Huracán GT3 Evo	Lamborghini DGF 5.2 L V10	48	DAY; 15	SEB; 16	MDO; 3	DET; 5†	WGL; 14	MOS; DNS	LIM; 7	ELK; 2	VIR; 10	**LGA**; 1	**PET**; 6		10th	168
2020	Paul Miller Racing	GTD	Lamborghini Huracán GT3 Evo	Lamborghini DGF 5.2 L V10	48	DAY; 1	DAY	SEB	ELK	VIR; 14	ATL; 2	MDO	CLT	PET; 7	LGA	SEB; 13		12th	126
2021	Paul Miller Racing	GTD	Lamborghini Huracán GT3 Evo	Lamborghini DGF 5.2 L V10	1	DAY; 3	SEB; 11	MDO; 3	DET; 6	WGL; 2	**WGL**; 10	LIM; 2	ELK; 7	LGA; 2	**LBH**; 1	VIR; 2	**PET**; 7	2nd	3163
2022	Paul Miller Racing	GTD	BMW M4 GT3	BMW S58B30T0 3.0 L Twin-Turbo I6	1	DAY	SEB; 16	**LBH**; 1	LGA; 4	**MDO**; 2	DET; 3	WGL; 13	MOS; 5	LIM; 1	ELK; 4	VIR; 3	PET; 5	6th	2679
2023	Paul MIller Racing	GTD	BMW M4 GT3	BMW S58B30T0 3.0 L Twin-Turbo I6	1	DAY; 8	SEB; 1	LBH; 1	MON; 10	WGL; 2	MOS; 1	LIM; 8	**ELK**; **1**	**VIR**; **1**	**IMS**; **3**	PET; 18		1st	3482
2024	Paul Miller Racing	GTD Pro	BMW M4 GT3	BMW S58B30T0 3.0 L Twin-Turbo I6	1	DAY; 3	SEB; 4	LGA; 7	DET; 5	WGL; 8	MOS; 8	ELK; 2	**VIR**; **1**	IMS; 8	PET; 7			4th	2949
2025	Paul Miller Racing	GTD Pro	BMW M4 GT3 Evo	BMW S58B30T0 3.0 L Twin-Turbo I6	1	DAY; 4	SEB; 3	LGA; 10	DET; 11	WGL; 7	**MOS**; **6**	ELK; 1	VIR; 6	IMS; 8	PET; 9			7th	2794
2025	Paul Miller Racing	GTD Pro	BMW M4 GT3 Evo	BMW S58B30T0 3.0 L Twin-Turbo I6	48	DAY; 12	SEB; 2	LGA; 5	DET; 7	WGL; 1	MOS; 9	ELK; 7	VIR; 10	**IMS**; **3**	**PET**; **1**			4th	2984
2026	Paul Miller Racing	GTD Pro	BMW M4 GT3 Evo	BMW S58B30T0 3.0 L Twin-Turbo I6	1	DAY; 1	SEB; 5	LGA; 8	DET; 4	WGL; 2	MOS; 3	ELK; 11	VIR; 5	IMS; 6	PET; 3			1st	3012
