= 2015 Chevrolet Sports Car Classic =

Sports Car race

The layout of The Raceway on Belle Isle

The 2015 Chevrolet Sports Car Classic was a sports car race sanctioned by the International Motor Sports Association (IMSA). The race was held at The Raceway on Belle Isle in Detroit, Michigan on May 30, 2015. The race was the fifth round of the 2015 United SportsCar Championship.

== Background ==
=== Preview ===
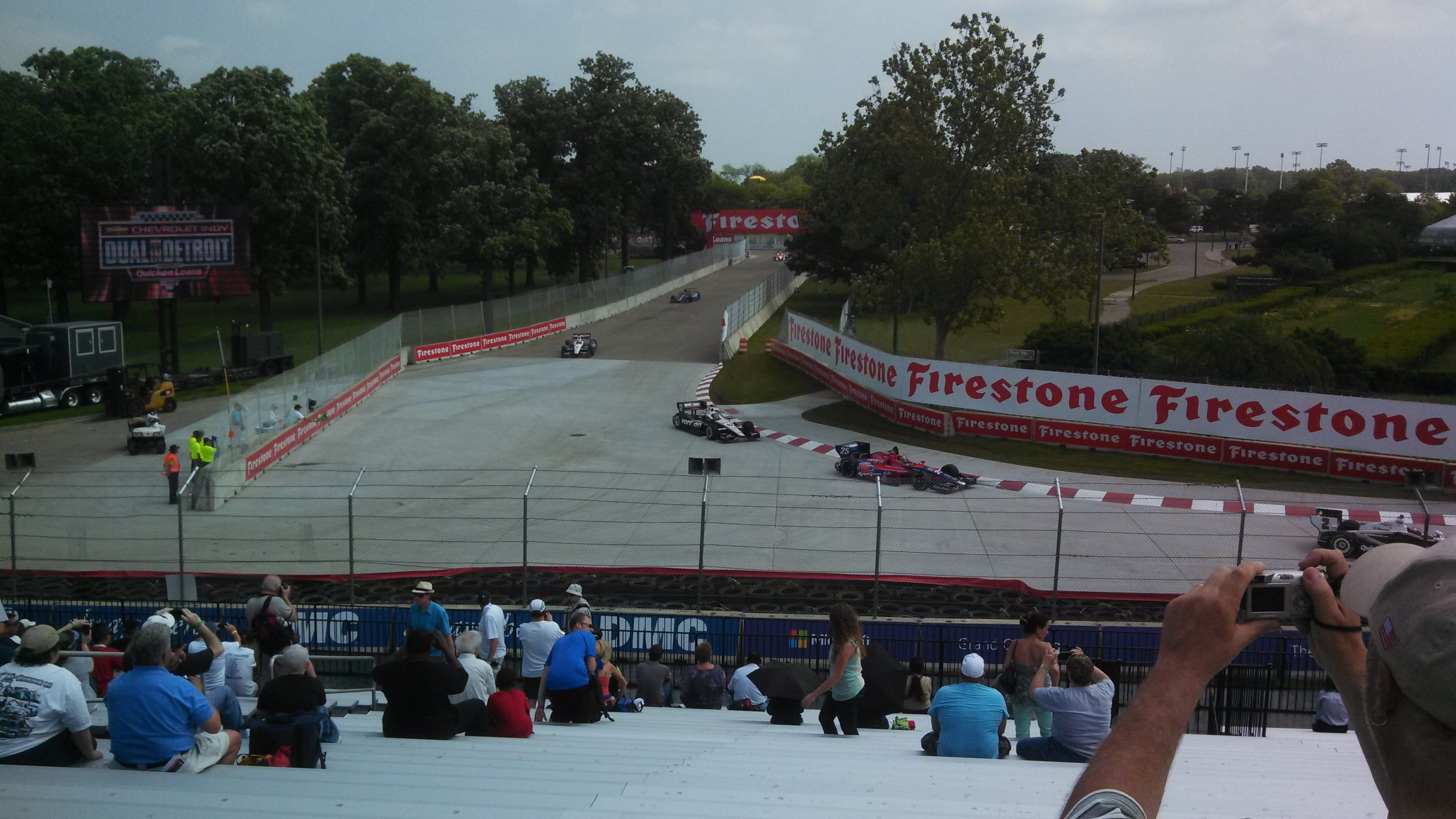
The Raceway on Belle Isle, where the race was held.

International Motor Sports Association (IMSA) president Scott Atherton confirmed the race was part of the schedule for the 2015 IMSA Tudor United SportsCar Championship (IMSA TUSC) in August 2014. It was the second consecutive year the event was held as part of the Tudor United SportsCar Championship, and the sixth annual running of the race, counting the period between 2007 and 2013 when it was a round of the Rolex Sports Car Series and the American Le Mans Series respectively. The 2015 Chevrolet Sports Car Classic was the fourth of twelve scheduled sports car races of 2015 by IMSA, the shortest in terms of time, and was the third round not held on the held as part of the North American Endurance Cup. The event was held at the fourteen-turn 2.350 mi (3.782 km) Belle Isle Park on May 30, 2015. The PC category would participate in the event for the first time.

=== Entry list ===
Twenty-three cars were officially entered for the Chevrolet Sports Car Classic, with the bulk of the entries in the Prototype (P) and Grand Touring Daytona (GTD) categories. Action Express Racing (AER) fielded two Chevrolet Corvette DP cars while VisitFlorida Racing (VFR) and Wayne Taylor Racing (WTR) fielded one. Chip Ganassi Racing (CGR) entered one Ford-powered Riley MkXXVI. Mazda Motorsports had one Lola B12/80, and Michael Shank Racing (MSR) entered one Ligier JS P2 chassis with Honda HR28TT twin-turbocharged 2.8-liter V6 engine. The DeltaWing skipped to undergo further testing. The Prototype Challenge (PC) class was composed of six Oreca FLM09 cars. CORE Autosport, JDC-Miller MotorSports, Performance Tech PR1/Mathiasen Motorsports, RSR Racing, and Starworks Motorsport entered one car each. In the list of GTD entrants, ten GT-specification vehicles were represented by six different manufacturers. With the absence of the Grand Touring Le Mans (GTLM) class from the field, only three racing classes were represented in Belle Isle.

== Qualifying ==
=== Qualifying results ===
Pole positions in each class are indicated in bold and by ‡. P stands for Prototype, PC (Prototype Challenge), and GTD (Grand Touring Daytona).

Pos.	Class	No.	Team	Driver	Time	Gap	Grid
1	**P**	**5**	**(United States) Action Express Racing**	**(Brazil) Christian Fittipaldi**	**1:24.746**	**_**	1‡
2	P	10	(United States) Wayne Taylor Racing	(United States) Ricky Taylor	1:24.796	+0.050	2
3	P	90	(United States) VisitFlorida.com Racing	(Canada) Michael Valiante	1:25.156	+0.410	3
4	P	01	(United States) Chip Ganassi Racing	(United States) Scott Pruett	1:25.987	+1.241	4
5	P	31	(United States) Action Express Racing	(United States) Eric Curran	1:26.009	+1.263	5
6	P	60	(United States) Michael Shank Racing with Curb/Agajanian	(United States) John Pew	1:26.889	+2.143	6
7	**PC**	**38**	**(United States) Performance Tech Motorsports**	**(United States) James French**	**1:29.317**	**+4.571**	7‡
8	PC	11	(United States) RSR Racing	(Canada) Chris Cumming	1:29.321	+4.575	8
9	PC	8	(United States) Starworks Motorsport	(Germany) Mirco Schultis	1:30.687	+5.941	9
10	PC	52	(United States) PR1/Mathiasen Motorsports	(United States) Mike Guasch	1:30.780	+6.034	10
11	PC	54	(United States) CORE Autosport	(United States) Jon Bennett	1:31.180	+6.434	11
12	P	07	(United States) SpeedSource	(United States) Tom Long	1:31.308	+6.562	12
13	PC	85	(United States) JDC-Miller MotorSports	(Canada) Misha Goikhberg	1:31.741	+6.995	13
14	**GTD**	**48**	**(United States) Paul Miller Racing**	**(South Africa) Dion von Moltke**	**1:33.546**	**+8.800**	14‡
15	GTD	33	(United States) Riley Motorsports	(United States) Ben Keating	1:34.261	+9.515	15
16	GTD	007	(United States) TRG-AMR North America	(Denmark) Christina Nielsen	1:34.338	+9.592	16
17	GTD	73	(United States) Park Place Motorsports	**(United States) Patrick Lindsey**	1:34.656	+9.910	17
18	GTD	23	(United States) Team Seattle / Alex Job Racing	(United Kingdom) Ian James	1:34.821	+10.075	18
19	GTD	58	(United States) Wright Motorsports	(United States) Madison Snow	1:35.031	+10.267	19
20	GTD	63	(United States) Scuderia Corsa	(United States) Bill Sweedler	1:35.632	+10.886	20
21	GTD	44	(United States) Magnus Racing	(United States) John Potter	1:35.801	+11.055	21
22	GTD	22	(United States) Alex Job Racing	(United States) Cooper MacNeil	1:37.080	+12.334	22
23	GTD	97	(United States) Turner Motorsport	(United States) Michael Marsal	1:37.218	+12.472	23

== Race ==
=== Race results ===
Class winners are denoted in bold and ‡. P stands for Prototype, PC (Prototype Challenge), and GTD (Grand Touring Daytona).

Final race classification
Pos	Class	No.	Team	Drivers	Chassis	Tire	Laps	Time/Retired
Pos	Class	No.	Team	Drivers	Engine	Tire	Laps	Time/Retired
1	**P**	**31**	**(United States) Action Express Racing**	**(United States) Eric Curran (United States) Dane Cameron**	**Corvette Daytona Prototype**	C	**59**	**1:40:49.112‡**
1	**P**	**31**	**(United States) Action Express Racing**	**(United States) Eric Curran (United States) Dane Cameron**	**Chevrolet 5.5 L V8**	C	**59**	**1:40:49.112‡**
2	P	60	(United States) Michael Shank Racing with Curb/Agajanian	(United States) John Pew (Brazil) Oswaldo Negri Jr.	Ligier JS P2	C	59	+18.631
2	P	60	(United States) Michael Shank Racing with Curb/Agajanian	(United States) John Pew (Brazil) Oswaldo Negri Jr.	Honda HR28TT 2.8 L V6 Turbo	C	59	+18.631
3	P	5	(United States) Action Express Racing	(Portugal) João Barbosa (Brazil) Christian Fittipaldi	Corvette Daytona Prototype	C	59	+19.207
3	P	5	(United States) Action Express Racing	(Portugal) João Barbosa (Brazil) Christian Fittipaldi	Chevrolet 5.5 L V8	C	59	+19.207
4	P	01	(United States) Chip Ganassi Racing	(United States) Joey Hand (United States) Scott Pruett	Ford EcoBoost Riley DP	C	59	+20.391
4	P	01	(United States) Chip Ganassi Racing	(United States) Joey Hand (United States) Scott Pruett	Ford EcoBoost 3.5 L V6 Turbo	C	59	+20.391
5	P	90	(United States) VisitFlorida.com Racing	(United Kingdom) Richard Westbrook (Canada) Michael Valiante	Corvette Daytona Prototype	C	59	+21.513
5	P	90	(United States) VisitFlorida.com Racing	(United Kingdom) Richard Westbrook (Canada) Michael Valiante	Chevrolet 5.5 L V8	C	59	+21.513
6	**PC**	**8**	**(United States) Starworks Motorsport**	**(Germany) Mirco Schultis (Netherlands) Renger van der Zande**	**Oreca FLM09**	C	**59**	**+45.524‡**
6	**PC**	**8**	**(United States) Starworks Motorsport**	**(Germany) Mirco Schultis (Netherlands) Renger van der Zande**	**Chevrolet 6.2 L V8**	C	**59**	**+45.524‡**
7	P	10	(United States) Wayne Taylor Racing	(United States) Jordan Taylor (United States) Ricky Taylor	Corvette Daytona Prototype	C	59	+46.080
7	P	10	(United States) Wayne Taylor Racing	(United States) Jordan Taylor (United States) Ricky Taylor	Chevrolet 5.5 L V8	C	59	+46.080
8	P	07	(United States) SpeedSource	(United States) Tom Long (United States) Joel Miller	Mazda Prototype	C	59	+46.593
8	P	07	(United States) SpeedSource	(United States) Tom Long (United States) Joel Miller	Mazda Skyactiv-D 2.2 L Turbo I4 (Diesel)	C	59	+46.593
9	PC	85	(United States) JDC-Miller MotorSports	(Canada) Misha Goikhberg (South Africa) Stephen Simpson	Oreca FLM09	C	59	+1:01.774
9	PC	85	(United States) JDC-Miller MotorSports	(Canada) Misha Goikhberg (South Africa) Stephen Simpson	Chevrolet 6.2 L V8	C	59	+1:01.774
10	PC	38	(United States) Performance Tech Motorsports	(United States) James French (Canada) James Vance	Oreca FLM09	C	59	+1:17.299
10	PC	38	(United States) Performance Tech Motorsports	(United States) James French (Canada) James Vance	Chevrolet 6.2 L V8	C	59	+1:17.299
11	**GTD**	**23**	**(United States) Team Seattle / Alex Job Racing**	**(Germany) Mario Farnbacher (United Kingdom) Ian James**	**Porsche 911 GT America**	C	**57**	**+2 Laps‡**
11	**GTD**	**23**	**(United States) Team Seattle / Alex Job Racing**	**(Germany) Mario Farnbacher (United Kingdom) Ian James**	**Porsche 4.0 L Flat-6**	C	**57**	**+2 Laps‡**
12	GTD	007	(United States) TRG-AMR North America	(Australia) James Davison (Denmark) Christina Nielsen	Aston Martin V12 Vantage GT3	C	57	+2 Laps
12	GTD	007	(United States) TRG-AMR North America	(Australia) James Davison (Denmark) Christina Nielsen	Aston Martin 6.0 L V12	C	57	+2 Laps
13	GTD	48	(United States) Paul Miller Racing	(Germany) Christopher Haase (South Africa) Dion von Moltke	Audi R8 LMS ultra	C	57	+2 Laps
13	GTD	48	(United States) Paul Miller Racing	(Germany) Christopher Haase (South Africa) Dion von Moltke	Audi 5.2 L V10	C	57	+2 Laps
14	GTD	22	(United States) Alex Job Racing	(United States) Leh Keen (United States) Cooper MacNeil	Porsche 911 GT America	C	57	+2 Laps
14	GTD	22	(United States) Alex Job Racing	(United States) Leh Keen (United States) Cooper MacNeil	Porsche 4.0 L Flat-6	C	57	+2 Laps
15	GTD	73	(United States) Park Place Motorsports	(United States) Patrick Lindsey (United States) Spencer Pumpelly	Porsche 911 GT America	C	57	+2 Laps
15	GTD	73	(United States) Park Place Motorsports	(United States) Patrick Lindsey (United States) Spencer Pumpelly	Porsche 4.0 L Flat-6	C	57	+2 Laps
16	GTD	97	(United States) Turner Motorsport	(United States) Michael Marsal (Finland) Markus Palttala	BMW Z4 GT3	C	57	+2 Laps
16	GTD	97	(United States) Turner Motorsport	(United States) Michael Marsal (Finland) Markus Palttala	BMW 4.4 L V8	C	57	+2 Laps
17	GTD	44	(United States) Magnus Racing	(United States) John Potter (United States) Andy Lally	Porsche 911 GT America	C	56	+3 Laps
17	GTD	44	(United States) Magnus Racing	(United States) John Potter (United States) Andy Lally	Porsche 4.0 L Flat-6	C	56	+3 Laps
18 DNF	GTD	58	(United States) Wright Motorsports	(Belgium) Jan Heylen (United States) Madison Snow	Porsche 911 GT America	C	54	Accident
18 DNF	GTD	58	(United States) Wright Motorsports	(Belgium) Jan Heylen (United States) Madison Snow	Porsche 4.0 L Flat-6	C	54	Accident
19	PC	54	(United States) CORE Autosport	(United States) Jon Bennett (United States) Colin Braun	Oreca FLM09	C	54	+5 Laps
19	PC	54	(United States) CORE Autosport	(United States) Jon Bennett (United States) Colin Braun	Chevrolet 6.2 L V8	C	54	+5 Laps
20	GTD	63	(United States) Scuderia Corsa	(United States) Bill Sweedler (United States) Townsend Bell	Ferrari 458 Italia GT3	C	46	+13 Laps
20	GTD	63	(United States) Scuderia Corsa	(United States) Bill Sweedler (United States) Townsend Bell	Ferrari 4.5 L V8	C	46	+13 Laps
21 DNF	PC	11	(United States) RSR Racing	(Canada) Chris Cumming (Brazil) Bruno Junqueira	Oreca FLM09	C	38	Accident
21 DNF	PC	11	(United States) RSR Racing	(Canada) Chris Cumming (Brazil) Bruno Junqueira	Chevrolet 6.2 L V8	C	38	Accident
22 DNF	PC	52	(United States) PR1/Mathiasen Motorsports	(United States) Mike Guasch (United Kingdom) Tom Kimber-Smith	Oreca FLM09	C	32	Accident
22 DNF	PC	52	(United States) PR1/Mathiasen Motorsports	(United States) Mike Guasch (United Kingdom) Tom Kimber-Smith	Chevrolet 6.2 L V8	C	32	Accident
23 DNF	GTD	33	(United States) Riley Motorsports	(Netherlands) Jeroen Bleekemolen (United States) Ben Keating	Dodge Viper GT3-R	C	22	Accident
23 DNF	GTD	33	(United States) Riley Motorsports	(Netherlands) Jeroen Bleekemolen (United States) Ben Keating	Dodge 8.3 L V10	C	22	Accident

Tyre manufacturers
Key
Symbol	Tyre manufacturer
**C**	Continental

United SportsCar Championship
Previous race: Monterey Grand Prix	2015 season	Next race: 6 Hours of The Glen
