= RSR Racing =

American sports car racing team

RSR Racing was an American sports car racing team formed from the defunct Rocketsports Racing. In the spring of 2009, Paul Gentilozzi and his sons, Tony and John, founded RSR in partnership with Jaguar Cars Ltd. to build and race the Jaguar XKR in the American Le Mans Series GT2 class and to develop aftermarket performance parts for Jaguar cars in North America.

Following the completion of the Jaguar program, the team remained in the American Le Mans Series and later the IMSA SportsCar Championship focusing their efforts on the PC (Prototype Challenge) category for the 2012, 2013, 2014, and 2015 seasons.

== Team history ==
In 2010, Jaguar announced the company would enter the 2010 24 Hours of Le Mans with the JaguarRSR XKR GT2 built by Rocketsports Racing.

In 2011 JaguarRSR entered 2 cars featuring drivers Rocky Moran Jr. and P. J. Jones in the #98 Entry with Brazilian duo Bruno Junqueira and Cristiano da Matta in the #99 car.

In 2012 RSR Racing entered the IMSA LMPC category switching from the GT class. Season highlights included a victory at Mosport and a 2nd-place finish at Petit Le Mans.

2013 Saw Bruno Junqueira paired with Duncan Ende for the majority of the races. Top finishes include victories at Road America and Lime Rock Park.

The merger between ALMS and Grand-Am occurred in 2014 and RSR entered the new series with two cars. The 08 for Indycar driver Alex Tagliani and Canadian Chris Cumming. The 09 car featured Duncan Ende and Bruno Junqueira. The team recorded five pole positions during the year, and one victory at the Indianapolis round with Jack Hawksworth subbing for Alex Tagliani in the 08.

For 2015 Chris Cumming is paired with Bruno Junqueira in the #11 Automax Auto Group entry.

== See also ==
- 3GT Racing
