= 3GT Racing =

American racing team

3GT Racing is an American racing team formed by Paul, Tony and John Gentilozzi.

3GT competed at the 2017 IMSA SportsCar Championship with two Lexus RC F GT3 under the brand 3GT Racing, with Scott Pruett and Sage Karam as two of the drivers.

== Team history ==
3GT Racing was formed to race the Lexus RC F GT3. Owned and operated by five-time Trans-Am Series Champion, Paul Gentilozzi and his longtime partners, Tony and John Gentilozzi, the East Lansing, Michigan-based team principals have been involved in motorsports for more than 46 years and they have claimed more than 75 victories and 15 manufacturer and driver championships. Pruett and Karam will drive the No. 14 RC F GT3 while drivers Jack Hawksworth and Robert Alon will drive the No. 15 Lexus RC F GT3. 3GT Racing signed four drivers to complete its driver lineup for the IMSA WeatherTech SportsCar Championship's endurance events in 2017. Austin Cindric, Dominik Farnbacher, Ian James and Gustavo Menezes will join 3GT Racing for the four Tequila Patron North American Endurance Cup races, which include the Rolex 24 at Daytona, the Mobil 1 Twelve Hours of Sebring Fueled by Fresh from Florida, Sahlen's Six Hours of The Glen and the Petit LeMans powered by Mazda at Road Atlanta. James and Menezes will share the No. 14 Lexus RC F GT3 with Sage Karam and Scott Pruett, while Cindric and Farnbacher will team with Robert Alon and James Hawksworth in the No. 15 entry.

== See also ==
- Rocketsports Racing
- RSR Racing
