= Marc Miller (racing driver) =

American racing driver

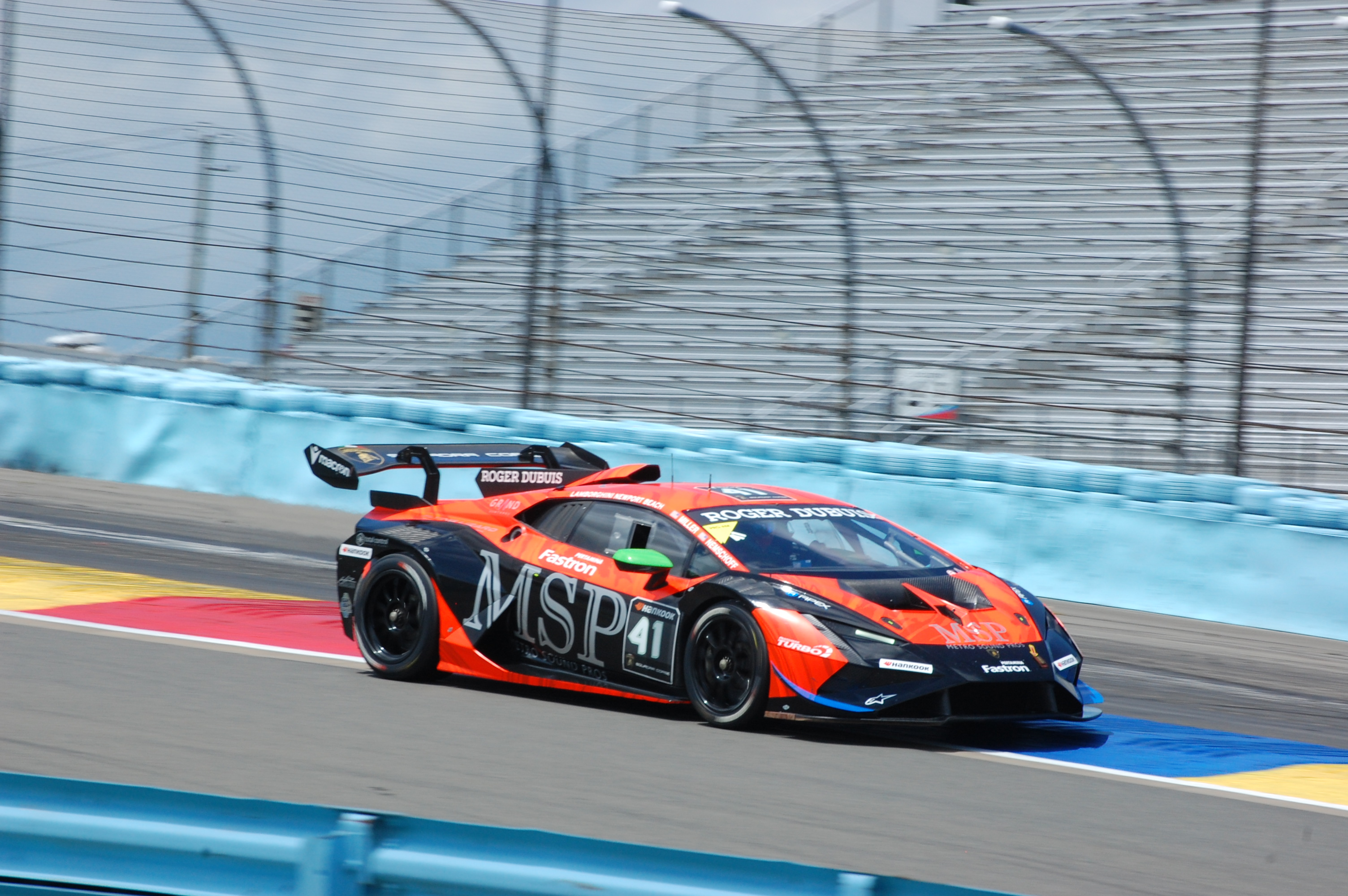
- Nationality: (United States) American
- Born: August 24, 1975 (age 51) Grand Rapids, Michigan, U.S.
- Categorisation: FIA Bronze (until 2018); FIA Silver (2019–)

Marc Alan Miller (born August 24, 1975, in Grand Rapids, Michigan) is an American professional race car driver. Miller captured the 2019 Trans Am TA2 Championship and earned victory at the prestigious Petit Le Mans endurance race in 2016. His career includes competition at some of the world's most celebrated racing events, including the 24 Hours of Le Mans, Rolex 24 Hour at Daytona, 12 Hours of Sebring, Spa 24 Hours and the 10 Hours of Suzuka.

Beyond his competitive achievements, Miller brings a combination of technical knowledge, communications experience and professional recognition. His honors include the SUNOCO Mark Donohue Technical Excellence Award, Continental Tire Extreme Spirit Award and Austin Hatcher Foundation Humanitarian Award.

Miller has twice competed in the 24 Hours of Le Mans, leading in both appearances in 2015 and 2016.

== Career ==
=== Karting ===
Miller began his career in karting, at the age of 11. He has raced in a variety of cars including karts, open-wheel, stock, and sportscars. Miller won the 2008 Rotax Max Masters U.S. National Championship (also known as the Rotax Max Challenge USA Grand Nationals). He amassed over 200 wins in karting over various classes from 4-cycle, 2-cycle, shifterkarts, enduro karts on both oval and road courses.

=== Stock cars ===
Miller competed part-time in CASCAR and CASCAR West, the Canadian offshoot of NASCAR from 2003 to 2006. Marc was the only American driver to compete in the series.

CASCAR Results
Year	Races	Wins	Top 5	Top 10
2003	4 of 12	0	0	0
2004	4 of 12	0	0	2
2005	6 of 12	0	0	2
2006	3 of 12	0	0	0
Total:	17	0	0	4

NASCAR West
Year	Races	Wins	Top 5	Top 10
2005	1 of 8	0	0	1
2006	1 of 8	0	0	0
Total:	2	0	0	1

=== Sports Car Racing ===
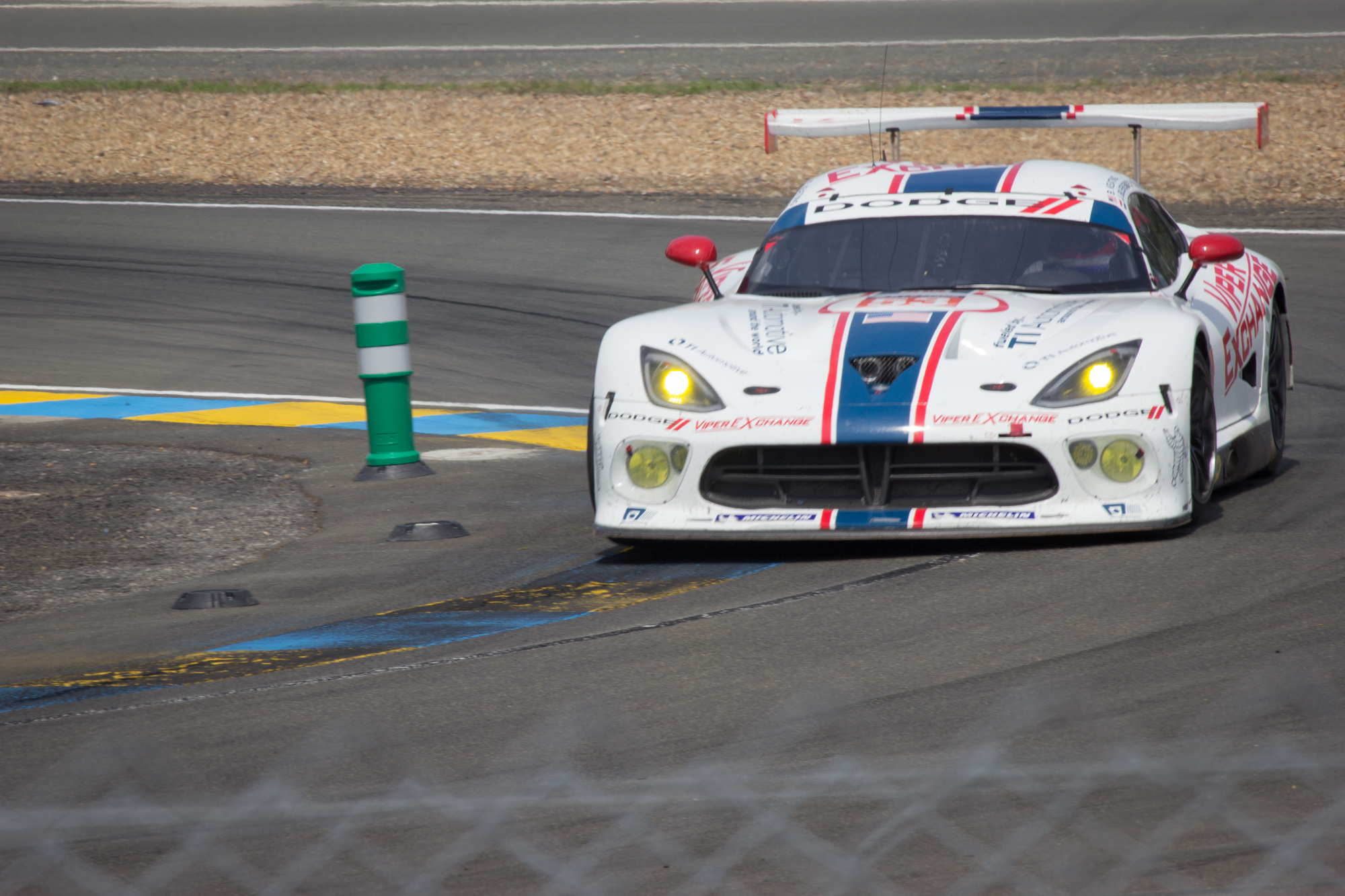
Riley Motorsports - SRT Viper GTS-R-53 at Le Mans.

In 2009, Miller was the runner up in the Mazda MX-5 Cup Championship. From 2012 to present Marc has driven for CJ Wilson of baseball fame's racing team, in the Continental Tire Sports Car Challenge. Concurrently, Miller has driven a Dodge Viper for Riley Motorsports in the 2015 24 Hours of Le Mans and Laguna Seca round of the . Miller was featured on Season 2 of the Dinner With Racers Podcast.

Since then, Miller has gone on to win at nearly every level of sports car racing, including race wins and runner-up finish in the Continental Tire Sports Car Challenge (now Michelin Pilot Series), race wins and podiums in the SRO GT4 Championship, SRO GT3 World Challenge (2019) and WeatherTech SportsCar Championship (2018–2023). He is the 2019 Trans Am TA Champion and has been a regular pro frontrunner in the IMSA Lamborghini Super Trofeo series (2023-).

== Personal life ==
Marc was featured in a short film called "On The Edge of Everything" that received two The Telly Awards in 2026. A bronze prize for the Automotive category and a silver prize for Directing. The project was directed and produced by Curtis Boggs from Barking Chihuahua Media who has gone on to produce a docuseries that features Dome Motorsport, whom Marc competes for in the SRO GT4 America championship. That series is featured as part of a YouTube series following Marc and his team here: https://www.youtube.com/@DOMEMotorsport

Miller lives in Holland, Michigan, with his wife and three children. His oldest son has autism.

== Racing Record ==
=== Complete WeatherTech SportsCar Championship results ===
(key) (Races in bold indicate pole position; results in italics indicate fastest lap)

Year	Team	Class	Make	Engine	1	2	3	4	5	6	7	8	9	10	11	12	Pos.	Points	Ref
2015	Riley Motorsports	GTD	Dodge Viper GT3-R	Dodge 8.3 V10	DAY	SEB	LGA; 8	BEL	WGL	LIM	ELK	VIR	AUS	ATL			47th	24	
2016	Riley Motorsports	GTD	Dodge Viper GT3-R	Dodge 8.3 V10	DAY; 9	SEB; 12†	LGA	BEL	WGL	MOS	LIM	ELK	VIR	AUS	**PET**; 1†		46th	25	
2018	CJ Wilson Racing	GTD	Acura NSX GT3	Acura 3.5 L Turbo V6	DAY	SEB; 16	MOH	BEL	WGL; 11	MOS	LIM	ELK	VIR	LGA	PET		46th	35	
2019	Black Swan Racing	GTD	Porsche 911 GT3 R	Porsche 4.0L Flat-6	DAY	SEB	MDO	DET	WGL; 10	MOS	LIM	ELK	VIR	LGA	PET		54th	21	
2020	Gradient Racing	GTD	Acura NSX GT3 Evo	Acura 3.5 L Turbo V6	DAY	DAY; 10	SEB; 7	ELK; 11	VIR; 10	ATL	MDO; 9	CLT; 12	PET	LGA; 12	SEB		17th	145	
2020	Riley Motorsports	GTD	Mercedes-AMG GT3 Evo	Mercedes-AMG M159 6.2 L V8	DAY	DAY	SEB	ELK	VIR	ATL	MDO	CLT	PET	LGA	SEB; 8		17th	145	
2021	Gradient Racing	GTD	Acura NSX GT3 Evo	Acura 3.5 L Turbo V6	DAY	SEB	MDO; 8	DET; 3	WGL	WGL; 6	LIM; 11	ELK; 9	LGA; 11	LBH; 8	VIR	PET	22nd	1185	
2022	Gradient Racing	GTD	Acura NSX GT3 Evo22	Acura 3.5 L Turbo V6	DAY; 13	SEB	LBH; 2	LGA	MDO	DET	WGL	MOS	LIM	ELK	VIR	PET	62nd	195	
2023	Gradient Racing	GTD	Acura NSX GT3 Evo22	Acura 3.5 L Turbo V6	DAY; 4	SEB; 12	LBH	MON	WGL; 5	MOS	LIM	ELK	VIR	IMS	PET; 15		29th	972	

^{†} Miller did not complete sufficient laps in order to score full points.
