= 2015 Monterey Grand Prix =

Sports Car race

Track map of Mazda Raceway Laguna Seca

The 2015 Continental Tire Monterey Grand Prix was a sports car race sanctioned by the International Motor Sports Association (IMSA) held on the Mazda Raceway Laguna Seca in Monterey, California, on May 3, 2015. The event served as the fourth round of the 2015 United SportsCar Championship.

== Background ==
=== Preview ===
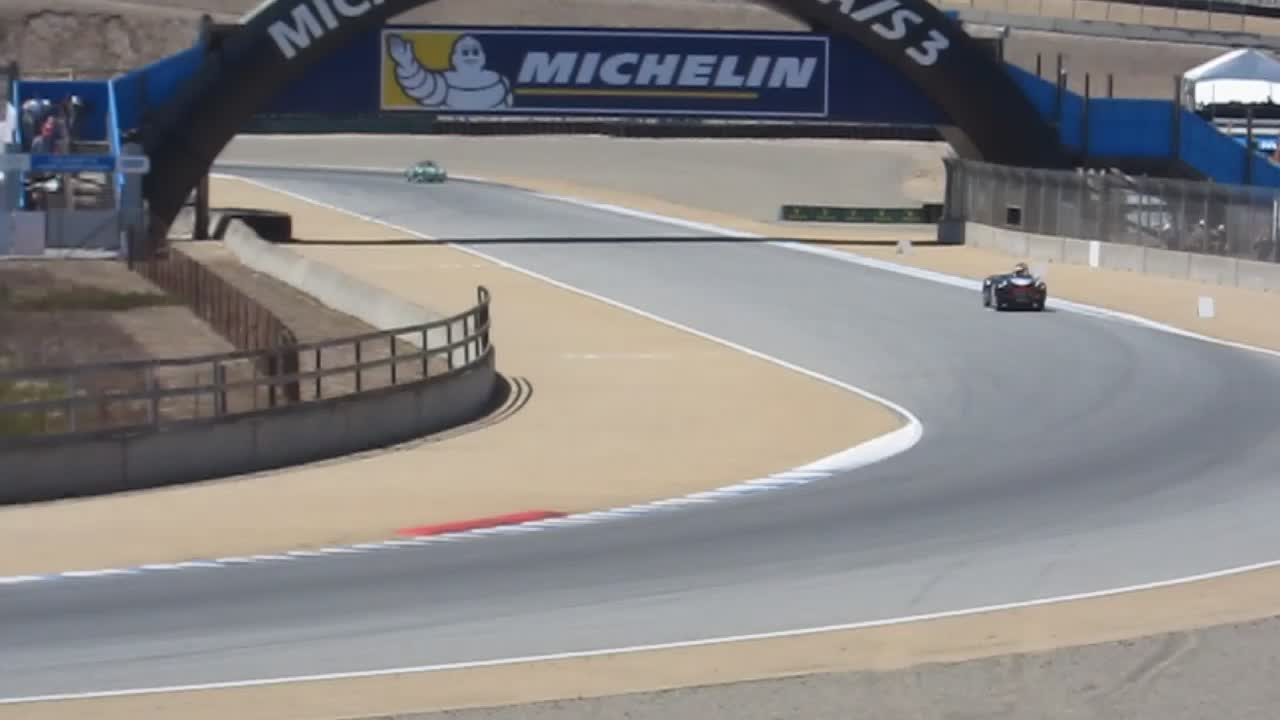
Mazda Raceway Laguna Seca, where the race was held.

International Motor Sports Association (IMSA) president Scott Atherton confirmed the race was part of the schedule for the 2015 IMSA Tudor United SportsCar Championship (IMSA TUSC) in August 2014. It was the second consecutive year the event was held as part of the Tudor United SportsCar Championship. The 2015 Continental Tire Monterey Grand Prix was the fourth of twelve scheduled sports car races of 2015 by IMSA, and it was the second round not held as part of the North American Endurance Cup. The event was held at the eleven-turn 2.238 mi (3.602 km) Mazda Raceway Laguna Seca in Monterey County, California on May 3, 2015. The event went to a single race format after utilizing a split race format the previous year due to the field size.

== Qualifying ==
=== Qualifying results ===
Pole positions in each class are indicated in bold and by ‡. P stands for Prototype, PC (Prototype Challenge), GTLM (Grand Touring Le Mans) and GTD (Grand Touring Daytona).

Pos.	Class	No.	Team	Driver	Time	Gap	Grid
1	**P**	**10**	**(United States) Wayne Taylor Racing**	**(United States) Jordan Taylor**	**1:18.718**	**_**	1‡
2	P	01	(United States) Chip Ganassi Racing	(United States) Scott Pruett	1:18.940	+0.222	2
3	P	90	(United States) VisitFlorida.com Racing	(Canada) Michael Valiante	1:19.448	+0.730	3
4	P	60	(United States) Michael Shank Racing with Curb/Agajanian	(United States) John Pew	1:19.651	+0.933	4
5	P	5	(United States) Action Express Racing	(Brazil) Christian Fittipaldi	1:19.894	+1.176	5
6	P	0	(United States) DeltaWing Racing Cars with Claro/TracFone	(United Kingdom) Katherine Legge	1:20.504	+1.786	6
7	P	31	(United States) Action Express Racing	(United States) Eric Curran	1:20.622	+1.904	7
8	P	70	(United States) SpeedSource	(United States) Tristan Nunez	1:20.957	+2.239	8
9	P	07	(United States) SpeedSource	(United States) Tom Long	1:21.138	+2.420	9
10	**GTLM**	**25**	**(United States) BMW Team RLL**	**(Germany) Dirk Werner**	**1:22.362**	**+3.644**	10‡
11	**PC**	**11**	**(United States) RSR Racing**	**(Canada) Chris Cumming**	**1:22.362**	**+3.847**	11‡
12	PC	52	(United States) PR1/Mathiasen Motorsports	(United States) Mike Guasch	1:22.565	+3.851	12
13	GTLM	24	(United States) BMW Team RLL	(Germany) Lucas Luhr	1:22.610	+3.892	13
14	GTLM	62	(United States) Risi Competizione	(Germany) Pierre Kaffer	1:22.610	+3.892	14
15	PC	38	(United States) Performance Tech Motorsports	(United States) James French	1:22.689	+3.971	15
16	GTLM	911	(United States) Porsche North America	(France) Patrick Pilet	1:22.708	+3.990	16
17	GTLM	4	(United States) Corvette Racing	(United States) Tommy Milner	1:22.711	+3.993	17
18	GTLM	912	(United States) Porsche North America	(Denmark) Michael Christensen	1:22.788	+4.070	18
19	GTLM	3	(United States) Corvette Racing	(Spain) Antonio García	1:22.815	+4.097	19
20	PC	54	(United States) CORE Autosport	(United States) Jon Bennett	1:23.165	+4.447	20
21	GTLM	17	(United States) Team Falken Tire	(Germany) Wolf Henzler	1:23.274	+4.556	21
22	PC	8	(United States) Starworks Motorsport	(Germany) Mirco Schultis	1:23.466	+4.748	22
23	PC	85	(United States) JDC-Miller MotorSports	(Canada) Misha Goikhberg	1:23.615	+4.897	23
24	PC	16	(United States) BAR1 Motorsports	(United States) Todd Slusher	1:24.539	+5.821	24
25	**GTD**	**73**	**(United States) Park Place Motorsports**	**(United States) Patrick Lindsey**	**1:27.040**	**+8.322**	25‡
26	GTD	93	(United States) Riley Motorsports	(United States) Marc Miller	1:28.021	+9.303	26
27	GTD	48	(United States) Paul Miller Racing	(South Africa) Dion von Moltke	1:28.031	+9.313	27
28	GTD	33	(United States) Riley Motorsports	(United States) Ben Keating	1:28.267	+9.549	28
29	GTD	44	(United States) Magnus Racing	(United States) John Potter	1:28.319	+9.601	29
30	GTD	007	(United States) TRG-AMR North America	(Denmark) Christina Nielsen	1:28.849	+10.131	30
31	GTD	23	(United States) Team Seattle / Alex Job Racing	(United Kingdom) Ian James	1:28.885	+10.167	31
32	GTD	45	(United States) Flying Lizard Motorsports	(United States) Patrick Byrne	1:28.946	+10.228	32
33	GTD	22	(United States) Alex Job Racing	(United States) Cooper MacNeil	1:28.966	+10.248	33
34	GTD	63	(United States) Scuderia Corsa	(United States) Bill Sweedler	1:29.207	+10.489	34
35	GTD	97	(United States) Turner Motorsport	(United States) Michael Marsal	1:29.254	+10.536	35

== Race ==
=== Race results ===
Class winners are denoted in bold and ‡. P stands for Prototype, PC (Prototype Challenge), GTLM (Grand Touring Le Mans) and GTD (Grand Touring Daytona).

Final race classification
Pos	Class	No.	Team	Drivers	Chassis	Tire	Laps	Time/Retired
Pos	Class	No.	Team	Drivers	Engine	Tire	Laps	Time/Retired
1	**P**	**90**	**(United States) VisitFlorida.com Racing**	**(United Kingdom) Richard Westbrook (Canada) Michael Valiante**	**Corvette Daytona Prototype**	C	**112**	**2:40:46.127‡**
1	**P**	**90**	**(United States) VisitFlorida.com Racing**	**(United Kingdom) Richard Westbrook (Canada) Michael Valiante**	**Chevrolet 5.5 L V8**	C	**112**	**2:40:46.127‡**
2	P	10	(United States) Wayne Taylor Racing	(United States) Jordan Taylor (United States) Ricky Taylor	Corvette Daytona Prototype	C	112	+1.351
2	P	10	(United States) Wayne Taylor Racing	(United States) Jordan Taylor (United States) Ricky Taylor	Chevrolet 5.5 L V8	C	112	+1.351
3	P	60	(United States) Michael Shank Racing with Curb/Agajanian	(United States) John Pew (Brazil) Oswaldo Negri Jr.	Ligier JS P2	C	112	+29.655
3	P	60	(United States) Michael Shank Racing with Curb/Agajanian	(United States) John Pew (Brazil) Oswaldo Negri Jr.	Honda HR28TT 2.8 L V6 Turbo	C	112	+29.655
4	P	5	(United States) Action Express Racing	(Portugal) João Barbosa (Brazil) Christian Fittipaldi	Corvette Daytona Prototype	C	112	+1:14.104
4	P	5	(United States) Action Express Racing	(Portugal) João Barbosa (Brazil) Christian Fittipaldi	Chevrolet 5.5 L V8	C	112	+1:14.104
5	P	31	(United States) Action Express Racing	(United States) Eric Curran (United States) Dane Cameron	Corvette Daytona Prototype	C	112	+1:14.752
5	P	31	(United States) Action Express Racing	(United States) Eric Curran (United States) Dane Cameron	Chevrolet 5.5 L V8	C	112	+1:14.752
6	**PC**	**11**	**(United States) RSR Racing**	**(Canada) Chris Cumming (Brazil) Bruno Junqueira**	**Oreca FLM09**	C	**110**	**+2 laps‡**
6	**PC**	**11**	**(United States) RSR Racing**	**(Canada) Chris Cumming (Brazil) Bruno Junqueira**	**Chevrolet 6.2 L V8**	C	**110**	**+2 laps‡**
7	P	70	(United States) SpeedSource	(United States) Jonathan Bomarito (United States) Tristan Nunez	Mazda Prototype	C	110	+2 Laps
7	P	70	(United States) SpeedSource	(United States) Jonathan Bomarito (United States) Tristan Nunez	Mazda Skyactiv-D 2.2 L Turbo I4 (Diesel)	C	110	+2 Laps
8	PC	54	(United States) CORE Autosport	(United States) Jon Bennett (United States) Colin Braun	Oreca FLM09	C	110	+2 Laps
8	PC	54	(United States) CORE Autosport	(United States) Jon Bennett (United States) Colin Braun	Chevrolet 6.2 L V8	C	110	+2 Laps
9	**GTLM**	**24**	**(United States) BMW Team RLL**	**(United States) John Edwards (Germany) Lucas Luhr**	**BMW Z4 GTE**	MI	**108**	**+4 Laps‡**
9	**GTLM**	**24**	**(United States) BMW Team RLL**	**(United States) John Edwards (Germany) Lucas Luhr**	**BMW 4.4 L V8**	MI	**108**	**+4 Laps‡**
10	PC	38	(United States) Performance Tech Motorsports	(United States) James French (United States) Mike Hedlund	Oreca FLM09	C	108	+4 Laps
10	PC	38	(United States) Performance Tech Motorsports	(United States) James French (United States) Mike Hedlund	Chevrolet 6.2 L V8	C	108	+4 Laps
11	GTLM	25	(United States) BMW Team RLL	(United States) Bill Auberlen (Germany) Dirk Werner	BMW Z4 GTE	MI	108	+4 Laps
11	GTLM	25	(United States) BMW Team RLL	(United States) Bill Auberlen (Germany) Dirk Werner	BMW 4.4 L V8	MI	108	+4 Laps
12	GTLM	911	(United States) Porsche North America	(Denmark) Michael Christensen (France) Patrick Pilet	Porsche 911 RSR	MI	108	+4 Laps
12	GTLM	911	(United States) Porsche North America	(Denmark) Michael Christensen (France) Patrick Pilet	Porsche 4.0 L Flat-6	MI	108	+4 Laps
13	GTLM	62	(United States) Risi Competizione	(Germany) Pierre Kaffer (Italy) Giancarlo Fisichella	Ferrari 458 Italia GT2	MI	108	+4 Laps
13	GTLM	62	(United States) Risi Competizione	(Germany) Pierre Kaffer (Italy) Giancarlo Fisichella	Ferrari 4.5 L V8	MI	108	+4 Laps
14	GTLM	912	(United States) Porsche North America	(Germany) Jörg Bergmeister (Denmark) Michael Christensen	Porsche 911 RSR	MI	108	+4 Laps
14	GTLM	912	(United States) Porsche North America	(Germany) Jörg Bergmeister (Denmark) Michael Christensen	Porsche 4.0 L Flat-6	MI	108	+4 Laps
15	GTLM	4	(United States) Corvette Racing	(United Kingdom) Oliver Gavin (United States) Tommy Milner	Chevrolet Corvette C7.R	MI	108	+4 Laps
15	GTLM	4	(United States) Corvette Racing	(United Kingdom) Oliver Gavin (United States) Tommy Milner	Chevrolet LT5.5 5.5 L V8	MI	108	+4 Laps
16	PC	85	(United States) JDC-Miller MotorSports	(Canada) Misha Goikhberg (United States) Zach Veach	Oreca FLM09	C	108	+4 Laps
16	PC	85	(United States) JDC-Miller MotorSports	(Canada) Misha Goikhberg (United States) Zach Veach	Chevrolet 6.2 L V8	C	108	+4 Laps
17	GTLM	3	(United States) Corvette Racing	(Spain) Antonio García (Denmark) Jan Magnussen	Chevrolet Corvette C7.R	MI	108	+4 Laps
17	GTLM	3	(United States) Corvette Racing	(Spain) Antonio García (Denmark) Jan Magnussen	Chevrolet LT5.5 5.5 L V8	MI	108	+4 Laps
18	GTLM	17	(United States) Team Falken Tire	(United States) Bryan Sellers (Germany) Wolf Henzler	Porsche 911 RSR	FAL	108	+4 Laps
18	GTLM	17	(United States) Team Falken Tire	(United States) Bryan Sellers (Germany) Wolf Henzler	Porsche 4.0 L Flat-6	FAL	108	+4 Laps
19	PC	16	(United States) BAR1 Motorsports	(United States) John Falb (United States) Todd Slusher	Oreca FLM09	C	106	+6 Laps
19	PC	16	(United States) BAR1 Motorsports	(United States) John Falb (United States) Todd Slusher	Chevrolet 6.2 L V8	C	106	+6 Laps
20	PC	8	(United States) Starworks Motorsport	(Germany) Mirco Schultis (Netherlands) Renger van der Zande	Oreca FLM09	C	104	+8 Laps
20	PC	8	(United States) Starworks Motorsport	(Germany) Mirco Schultis (Netherlands) Renger van der Zande	Chevrolet 6.2 L V8	C	104	+8 Laps
21	**GTD**	**73**	**(United States) Park Place Motorsports**	**(United States) Patrick Lindsey (United States) Spencer Pumpelly**	**Porsche 911 GT America**	C	**103**	**+9 Laps‡**
21	**GTD**	**73**	**(United States) Park Place Motorsports**	**(United States) Patrick Lindsey (United States) Spencer Pumpelly**	Porsche 4.0 L Flat-6	C	**103**	**+9 Laps‡**
22	GTD	48	(United States) Paul Miller Racing	(Germany) Christopher Haase (South Africa) Dion von Moltke	Audi R8 LMS ultra	C	103	+9 Laps
22	GTD	48	(United States) Paul Miller Racing	(Germany) Christopher Haase (South Africa) Dion von Moltke	Audi 5.2 L V10	C	103	+9 Laps
23	P	01	(United States) Chip Ganassi Racing	(United States) Joey Hand (United States) Scott Pruett	Ford EcoBoost Riley DP	C	103	+9 Laps
23	P	01	(United States) Chip Ganassi Racing	(United States) Joey Hand (United States) Scott Pruett	Ford EcoBoost 3.5 L V6 Turbo	C	103	+9 Laps
24	GTD	23	(United States) Team Seattle / Alex Job Racing	(Germany) Mario Farnbacher (United Kingdom) Ian James	Porsche 911 GT America	C	103	+9 Laps
24	GTD	23	(United States) Team Seattle / Alex Job Racing	(Germany) Mario Farnbacher (United Kingdom) Ian James	Porsche 4.0 L Flat-6	C	103	+9 Laps
25	GTD	63	(United States) Scuderia Corsa	(United States) Bill Sweedler (United States) Townsend Bell	Ferrari 458 Italia GT3	C	103	+9 Laps
25	GTD	63	(United States) Scuderia Corsa	(United States) Bill Sweedler (United States) Townsend Bell	Ferrari 4.5 L V8	C	103	+9 Laps
26	GTD	007	(United States) TRG-AMR North America	(Australia) James Davison (Denmark) Christina Nielsen	Aston Martin V12 Vantage GT3	C	102	+10 Laps
26	GTD	007	(United States) TRG-AMR North America	(Australia) James Davison (Denmark) Christina Nielsen	Aston Martin 6.0 L V12	C	102	+10 Laps
27	GTD	44	(United States) Magnus Racing	(United States) John Potter (United States) Andy Lally	Porsche 911 GT America	C	102	+10 Laps
27	GTD	44	(United States) Magnus Racing	(United States) John Potter (United States) Andy Lally	Porsche 4.0 L Flat-6	C	102	+10 Laps
28	GTD	22	(United States) Alex Job Racing	(United States) Leh Keen (United States) Cooper MacNeil	Porsche 911 GT America	C	102	+10 Laps
28	GTD	22	(United States) Alex Job Racing	(United States) Leh Keen (United States) Cooper MacNeil	Porsche 4.0 L Flat-6	C	102	+10 Laps
29	GTD	93	(United States) Riley Motorsports	(United States) Marc Miller (United States) Jeff Mosing	Dodge Viper GT3-R	C	102	+10 Laps
29	GTD	93	(United States) Riley Motorsports	(United States) Marc Miller (United States) Jeff Mosing	Dodge 8.3 L V10	C	102	+10 Laps
30	GTD	45	(United States) Flying Lizard Motorsports	(United States) Patrick Byrne (United States) Guy Cosmo	Audi R8 LMS ultra	C	100	+12 Laps
30	GTD	45	(United States) Flying Lizard Motorsports	(United States) Patrick Byrne (United States) Guy Cosmo	Audi 5.2 L V10	C	100	+12 Laps
31 DNF	GTD	97	(United States) Turner Motorsport	(United States) Michael Marsal (Finland) Markus Palttala	BMW Z4 GT3	C	98	Crash
31 DNF	GTD	97	(United States) Turner Motorsport	(United States) Michael Marsal (Finland) Markus Palttala	BMW 4.4 L V8	C	98	Crash
32	GTD	33	(United States) Riley Motorsports	(Netherlands) Jeroen Bleekemolen (United States) Ben Keating	Dodge Viper GT3-R	C	97	+15 Laps
32	GTD	33	(United States) Riley Motorsports	(Netherlands) Jeroen Bleekemolen (United States) Ben Keating	Dodge 8.3 L V10	C	97	+15 Laps
33 DNF	PC	52	(United States) PR1/Mathiasen Motorsports	(United States) Mike Guasch (United Kingdom) Tom Kimber-Smith	Oreca FLM09	C	96	Electrical
33 DNF	PC	52	(United States) PR1/Mathiasen Motorsports	(United States) Mike Guasch (United Kingdom) Tom Kimber-Smith	Chevrolet 6.2 L V8	C	96	Electrical
34 DNF	P	0	(United States) DeltaWing Racing Cars with Claro/TracFone	(Mexico) Memo Rojas (United Kingdom) Katherine Legge	DeltaWing DWC13	C	38	Brake
34 DNF	P	0	(United States) DeltaWing Racing Cars with Claro/TracFone	(Mexico) Memo Rojas (United Kingdom) Katherine Legge	Élan (Mazda) 1.9 L I4 Turbo	C	38	Brake
35 DNF	P	07	(United States) SpeedSource	(United States) Tom Long (United States) Joel Miller	Mazda Prototype	C	18	Engine
35 DNF	P	07	(United States) SpeedSource	(United States) Tom Long (United States) Joel Miller	Mazda Skyactiv-D 2.2 L Turbo I4 (Diesel)	C	18	Engine

Tyre manufacturers
Key
Symbol	Tyre manufacturer
**C**	Continental
**MI**	Michelin
**FAL**	Falken Tire

United SportsCar Championship
Previous race: Tequila Patrón Sports Car Showcase	2015 season	Next race: Chevrolet Sports Car Classic
