= 2020 Cadillac Grand Prix of Sebring =

Third round of the 2020 IMSA SportsCar Championship season

Track map of Sebring International Raceway

The 2020 Cadillac Grand Prix of Sebring was a sports car race sanctioned by the International Motor Sports Association (IMSA). The race was held at Sebring International Raceway in Sebring, Florida on July 18, 2020. This race was the third round of the 2020 WeatherTech SportsCar Championship, and the second round of the 2020 WeatherTech Sprint Cup.

The race was won by the #31 team of Pipo Derani and Felipe Nasr, while the LMP2 class victory was taken by Patrick Kelly and Spencer Pigot, who were awarded the win after the #81 entry was disqualified for failing to meet drive time limits. The GTLM class was won by the #4 entry for Tommy Milner and Oliver Gavin, while Jack Hawksworth and Aaron Telitz secured their second consecutive class victory in GTD.

== Background ==
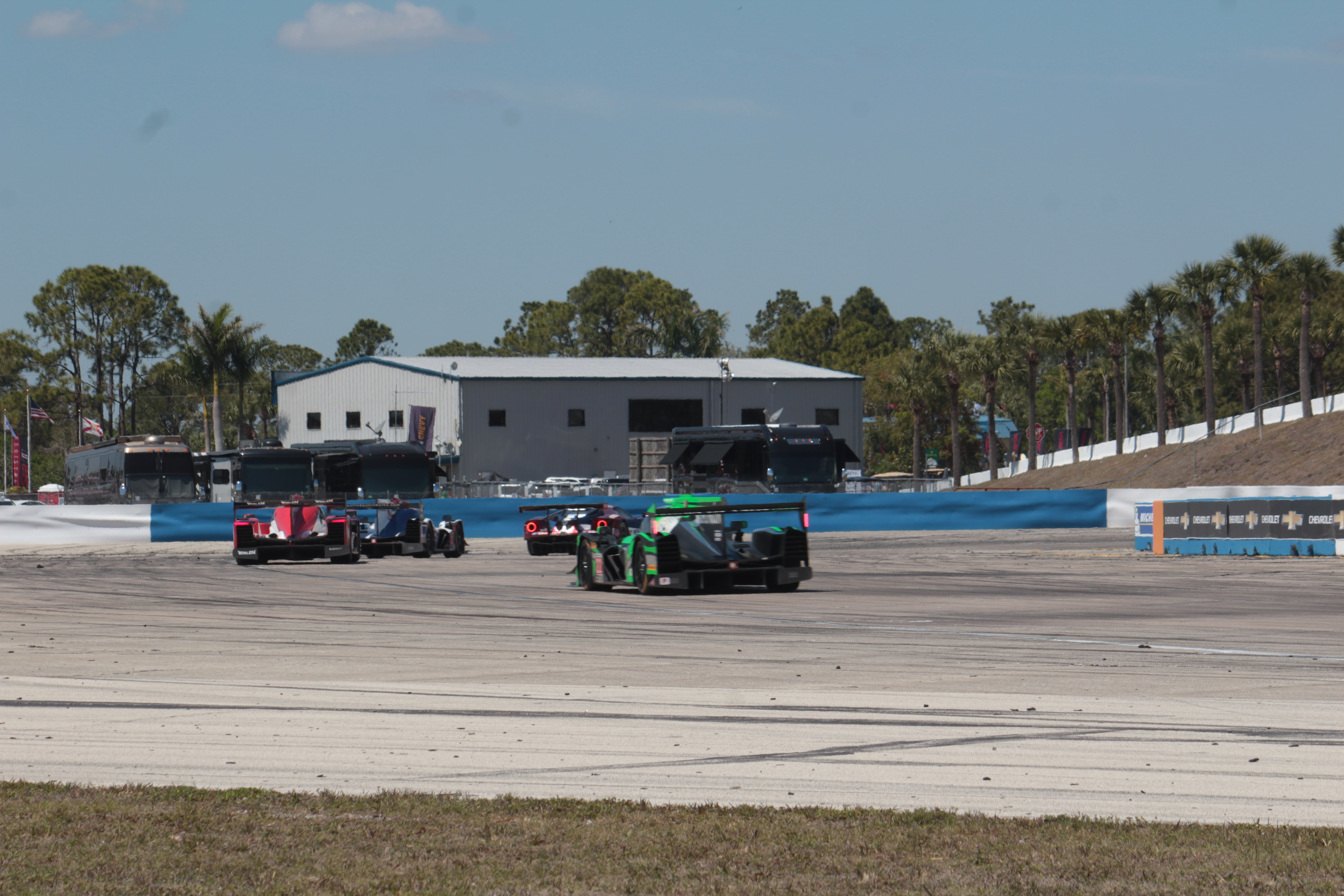
Sebring International Raceway, where the race was held.

The race was just the second for the WeatherTech SportsCar Championship after returning from the pandemic-induced hiatus. The race was added to the schedule in May due to said pandemic, becoming the second race of the season at Sebring alongside the rescheduled 12-hour race. Similarly to the previous round at Daytona, a limited number of fans were announced to be allowed into the track for the event. In late June, Cadillac was announced as the title sponsor of the event. The race marked the beginning of the LMP2 overall championship, as their only previous race (the 24 Hours of Daytona) counted for the Michelin Endurance Cup exclusively. Similarly, the GTD class only scored points towards the WeatherTech Sprint Cup in this race, not the overall GTD championship.

On July 10, 2020, IMSA released the latest technical bulletin regarding Balance of Performance for the race. However, no changes were made to any cars taking part in the event.

Before the race, Oliver Jarvis and Tristan Nunez led the DPi Drivers' Championship with 64 points, ahead of Ryan Briscoe and Renger van der Zande, and Jonathan Bomarito and Harry Tincknell with 60 points. Earl Bamber and Laurens Vanthoor led the GTLM Drivers' Championship with 64 points, ahead of Antonio García and Jordan Taylor with 63 points. In GTD, Jack Hawksworth led the GTD Drivers' Championship with 57 points, ahead of Aaron Telitz with 54 points. Cadillac, BMW, and Lamborghini were leading their respective Manufacturers' Championships, while Mazda Motorsports, Porsche GT Team, and AIM Vasser Sullivan each led their own Teams' Championships. LMP2 drivers and teams would be scoring their first championship points of the season due to the 24 Hours of Daytona only counting towards the Michelin Endurance Cup championship.

=== Entries ===
A total of 29 cars took part in the event, up from 26 cars in the previous round, thanks in part to the inclusion of the LMP2 class which was absent from the Daytona race. There were 8 cars in the DPi class, 8 cars in the LMP2 class, 6 cars in the GTLM class, and 10 cars in the GTD class. The DPi field was unchanged in terms of entries from the previous event, although Felipe Nasr returned after missing the previous race due to testing positive for COVID-19. Stephen Simpson also replaced Chris Miller in the #85. Patrick Kelly replaced Simon Trummer in the #52 due to travel restrictions, and Gustavo Menezes was announced to run in the #81, making his first IMSA start since 2018. The two Meyer Shank Racing Acuras were absent from the event due to the round only scoring points towards the WeatherTech Sprint Cup.

== Practice ==
There were two practice sessions preceding the start of the race on Saturday, one on Friday and one on Saturday morning. The first session on Friday night lasted one hour and the second on Saturday morning lasted 75 minutes.

=== Practice 1 ===
The first practice session took place at 6:00 pm ET on Friday and ended with Renger van der Zande topping the charts for Konica Minolta Cadillac, with a lap time of 1:51.152. Gustavo Menezes set the fastest time in LMP2. The GTLM class was topped by the #912 Porsche GT Team Porsche 911 RSR-19 of Laurens Vanthoor with a time of 1:59.501. Jordan Taylor in the #3 Corvette Racing entry was second and Oliver Gavin rounded out the top 3. The GTD class was topped by the #76 Compass Racing McLaren 720S GT3 of Paul Holton with a time of 2:06.012.

Pos.	Class	No.	Team	Driver	Time	Gap
1	DPi	10	Konica Minolta Cadillac	Renger van der Zande	1:51.152	_
2	DPi	85	JDC-Miller MotorSports	Stephen Simpson	1:51.368	+0.216
3	DPi	31	Whelen Engineering Racing	Pipo Derani	1:52.596	+1.444

=== Practice 2 ===
The second and final practice session took place at 10:00 am ET on Saturday and ended with Pipo Derani topping the charts for Whelen Engineering Racing, with a lap time of 1:46.940. Gustavo Menezes set the fastest time in LMP2. Frédéric Makowiecki set the fastest time in GTLM with a time of 1:56.754. The GTD class was topped by the #63 Scuderia Corsa Ferrari 488 GT3 of Toni Vilander with a time of 2:02.358.

Pos.	Class	No.	Team	Driver	Time	Gap
1	DPi	31	Whelen Engineering Racing	Pipo Derani	1:46.940	_
2	DPi	5	JDC-Mustang Sampling Racing	Sébastien Bourdais	1:47.212	+0.272
3	DPi	7	Acura Team Penske	Hélio Castroneves	1:47.348	+0.408

== Qualifying ==
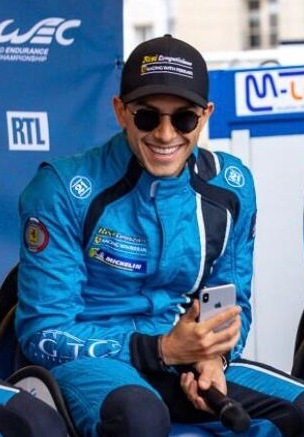
Pipo Derani (pictured in 2019) took the overall pole position for Whelen Engineering Racing.

Saturday's afternoon qualifying was broken into three sessions, with one session for the DPi and LMP2, GTLM, and GTD classes, which lasted for 15 minutes each, and a ten minute interval between the sessions. The rules dictated that all teams nominated a driver to qualify their cars, with the Pro-Am (LMP2/GTD) classes requiring a Bronze/Silver Rated Driver to qualify the car. The competitors' fastest lap times determined the starting order. IMSA then arranged the grid to put DPis ahead of the LMP2, GTLM, and GTD cars.

The first was for cars in GTD class. Frankie Montecalvo qualified on pole for the class driving the #12 car for AIM Vasser Sullivan.

The second session was for cars in the GTLM class. Jordan Taylor qualified on pole driving the #3 car for Corvette Racing, beating Oliver Gavin the sister #4 Corvette Racing entry by over three tenths of a second.

The final session of qualifying was for cars in the LMP2 and DPi classes. Pipo Derani qualified on pole driving the #31 car for Whelen Engineering Racing, beating Juan Pablo Montoya in the #6 Acura Team Penske by over two tenths of a second. Patrick Kelly set the fastest time in LMP2 driving the #52 PR1/Mathiasen Motorsports car.

=== Qualifying results ===
Pole positions in each class are indicated in bold and by ‡.

Pos.	Class	No.	Team	Driver	Time	Gap	Grid
1	**DPi**	**31**	**(United States) Whelen Engineering Racing**	**(Brazil) Pipo Derani**	**1:46.733**	**_**	1‡
2	DPi	6	(United States) Acura Team Penske	(Colombia) Juan Pablo Montoya	1:46.949	+0.216	2
3	DPi	10	(United States) Konica Minolta Cadillac	(Netherlands) Renger van der Zande	1:47.110	+0.377	3
4	DPi	77	(Canada) Mazda Motorsports	(United States) Tristan Nunez	1:47.200	+0.467	4
5	DPi	5	(United States) JDC-Mustang Sampling Racing	(France) Sébastien Bourdais	1:47.276	+0.543	5
6	DPi	7	(United States) Acura Team Penske	(Brazil) Hélio Castroneves	1:47.425	+0.692	6
7	DPi	85	(United States) JDC-Miller MotorSports	(South Africa) Stephen Simpson	1:47.824	+1.091	7
8	DPi	55	(Canada) Mazda Motorsports	(United States) Jonathan Bomarito	1:47.856	+1.123	8
9	**LMP2**	**52**	**(United States) PR1/Mathiasen Motorsports**	**(United States) Patrick Kelly**	**1:51.526**	**+4.793**	9‡
10	LMP2	81	(United States) DragonSpeed USA	(Sweden) Henrik Hedman	1:52.085	+5.352	10
11	LMP2	38	(United States) Performance Tech Motorsports	(Canada) Cameron Cassels	1:52.681	+5.948	11
12	LMP2	8	(United States) Tower Motorsports by Starworks	(Canada) John Farano	1:54.938	+8.205	13^{1}
13	LMP2	18	(United States) Era Motorsport	(United States) Dwight Merriman	1:55.012	+8.279	12
14	**GTLM**	**3**	**(United States) Corvette Racing**	**(United States) Jordan Taylor**	**1:55.634**	**+8.901**	14‡
15	GTLM	4	(United States) Corvette Racing	(United Kingdom) Oliver Gavin	1:56.015	+9.282	15
16	GTLM	911	(United States) Porsche GT Team	(France) Frédéric Makowiecki	1:56.079	+9.346	16
17	GTLM	912	(United States) Porsche GT Team	(Belgium) Laurens Vanthoor	1:56.398	+9.665	17
18	GTLM	24	(United States) BMW Team RLL	(Finland) Jesse Krohn	1:56.620	+9.887	18
19	GTLM	25	(United States) BMW Team RLL	(Canada) Bruno Spengler	1:56.909	+10.176	19
20	**GTD**	**12**	**(Canada) AIM Vasser Sullivan**	**(United States) Frankie Montecalvo**	**2:01.190**	**+14.457**	20‡
21	GTD	14	(Canada) AIM Vasser Sullivan	(United States) Aaron Telitz	2:01.257	+14.524	21
22	GTD	63	(United States) Scuderia Corsa	(United States) Cooper MacNeil	2:02.069	+15.336	22
23	GTD	96	(United States) Turner Motorsport	(United States) Robby Foley	2:02.098	+15.365	23
24	GTD	76	(United States) Compass Racing	(United States) Corey Fergus	2:02.203	+15.470	24
25	GTD	74	(United States) Riley Motorsports	(United States) Gar Robinson	2:02.371	+15.638	25
26	GTD	16	(United States) Wright Motorsports	(United States) Ryan Hardwick	2:02.729	+15.996	26
27	GTD	22	(United States) Gradient Racing	(United Kingdom) Till Bechtolsheimer	2:03.227	+16.494	27
28	GTD	30	(United States) Team Hardpoint	(United States) Robert Ferriol	2:04.343	+17.610	28
29	GTD	44	(United States) GRT Magnus	(United States) John Potter	2:04.424	+17.691	29

- ^{1} The No. 8 Tower Motorsport by Starworks entry was moved to the back of the LMP2 field as per Article 40.1.4 of the Sporting regulations (Change of starting tires).

== Race ==
=== Post-race ===
In DPi, Briscoe and van der Zande moved to first after being second coming into Sebring. Jarvis and Nunez dropped from first to second while Derani advanced from seventh to fifth. Since it was the season's first points paying race, Kelly and Pigot led the LMP2 Drivers' Championship with 35 points. As a result of winning the race, Gavin and Milner advanced from sixth to fourth in the GTLM Drivers' Championship. Jordan Taylor and Antonio García moved to first after being second coming into Sebring while Bamber and Vanthoor dropped from first to second. GTD drivers, teams, and manufactures did not score full season points due to the event only counting towards the WeatherTech Sprint Cup. Cadillac kept their advantage in the DPi Manufactures' Championship while Chevrolet took the lead of the GTLM Manufactures' Championship. Konica Minolta Cadillac DPi-V.R and Corvette Racing took the lead of their respective Teams' Championships while PR1/Mathiasen Motorsports became the leaders of the LMP2 Teams' Championship with eight rounds remaining.

=== Results ===
Class winners are denoted in bold and ‡.

Pos	Class	No.	Team	Drivers	Chassis	Laps	Time/retired
Pos	Class	No.	Team	Drivers	Engine	Laps	Time/retired
1	**DPi**	**31**	**(United States) Whelen Engineering Racing**	**(Brazil) Felipe Nasr (Brazil) Pipo Derani**	**Cadillac DPi-V.R**	**83**	**2:40:36.181‡**
1	**DPi**	**31**	**(United States) Whelen Engineering Racing**	**(Brazil) Felipe Nasr (Brazil) Pipo Derani**	**Cadillac 5.5L V8**	**83**	**2:40:36.181‡**
2	DPi	10	(United States) Konica Minolta Cadillac	(Netherlands) Renger van der Zande (Australia) Ryan Briscoe	Cadillac DPi-V.R	83	+36.432
2	DPi	10	(United States) Konica Minolta Cadillac	(Netherlands) Renger van der Zande (Australia) Ryan Briscoe	Cadillac 5.5L V8	83	+36.432
3	DPi	5	(United States) JDC-Mustang Sampling Racing	(Portugal) João Barbosa (France) Sébastien Bourdais	Cadillac DPi-V.R	83	+56.144
3	DPi	5	(United States) JDC-Mustang Sampling Racing	(Portugal) João Barbosa (France) Sébastien Bourdais	Cadillac 5.5L V8	83	+56.144
4	DPi	77	(Canada) Mazda Motorsports	(United Kingdom) Oliver Jarvis (United States) Tristan Nunez	Mazda RT24-P	83	+56.632
4	DPi	77	(Canada) Mazda Motorsports	(United Kingdom) Oliver Jarvis (United States) Tristan Nunez	Mazda MZ-2.0T 2.0L Turbo I4	83	+56.632
5	DPi	55	(Canada) Mazda Motorsports	(United States) Jonathan Bomarito (United Kingdom) Harry Tincknell	Mazda RT24-P	83	+1:27.300
5	DPi	55	(Canada) Mazda Motorsports	(United States) Jonathan Bomarito (United Kingdom) Harry Tincknell	Mazda MZ-2.0T 2.0L Turbo I4	83	+1:27.300
6	DPi	6	(United States) Acura Team Penske	(United States) Dane Cameron (Colombia) Juan Pablo Montoya	Acura ARX-05	83	+1:29.280
6	DPi	6	(United States) Acura Team Penske	(United States) Dane Cameron (Colombia) Juan Pablo Montoya	Acura AR35TT 3.5L Turbo V6	83	+1:29.280
7	DPi	7	(United States) Acura Team Penske	(Brazil) Hélio Castroneves (United States) Ricky Taylor	Acura ARX-05	83	+1:30.667
7	DPi	7	(United States) Acura Team Penske	(Brazil) Hélio Castroneves (United States) Ricky Taylor	Acura AR35TT 3.5L Turbo V6	83	+1:30.667
8	DPi	85	(United States) JDC-Miller MotorSports	(South Africa) Stephen Simpson (France) Tristan Vautier	Cadillac DPi-V.R	82	+1 Lap
8	DPi	85	(United States) JDC-Miller MotorSports	(South Africa) Stephen Simpson (France) Tristan Vautier	Cadillac 5.5L V8	82	+1 Lap
9	**LMP2**	**52**	**(United States) PR1 Mathiasen Motorsports**	**(United States) Patrick Kelly (United States) Spencer Pigot**	**Oreca 07**	**81**	**+2 Laps‡**
9	**LMP2**	**52**	**(United States) PR1 Mathiasen Motorsports**	**(United States) Patrick Kelly (United States) Spencer Pigot**	**Gibson GK428 4.2 L V8**	**81**	**+2 Laps‡**
10	LMP2	38	(United States) Performance Tech Motorsports	(Canada) Cameron Cassels (United States) Kyle Masson	Oreca 07	80	+3 Laps
10	LMP2	38	(United States) Performance Tech Motorsports	(Canada) Cameron Cassels (United States) Kyle Masson	Gibson GK428 4.2 L V8	80	+3 Laps
11	LMP2	18	(United States) Era Motorsports	(United States) Dwight Merriman (United Kingdom) Kyle Tilley	Oreca 07	80	+3 Laps
11	LMP2	18	(United States) Era Motorsports	(United States) Dwight Merriman (United Kingdom) Kyle Tilley	Gibson GK428 4.2 L V8	80	+3 Laps
12	**GTLM**	**4**	**(United States) Corvette Racing**	**(United Kingdom) Oliver Gavin (United States) Tommy Milner**	**Chevrolet Corvette C8.R**	**77**	**+6 Laps‡**
12	**GTLM**	**4**	**(United States) Corvette Racing**	**(United Kingdom) Oliver Gavin (United States) Tommy Milner**	**Chevrolet 5.5L V8**	**77**	**+6 Laps‡**
13	GTLM	3	(United States) Corvette Racing	(Spain) Antonio García (United States) Jordan Taylor	Chevrolet Corvette C8.R	77	+6 Laps
13	GTLM	3	(United States) Corvette Racing	(Spain) Antonio García (United States) Jordan Taylor	Chevrolet 5.5L V8	77	+6 Laps
14	GTLM	912	(United States) Porsche GT Team	(New Zealand) Earl Bamber (Belgium) Laurens Vanthoor	Porsche 911 RSR-19	77	+6 Laps
14	GTLM	912	(United States) Porsche GT Team	(New Zealand) Earl Bamber (Belgium) Laurens Vanthoor	Porsche 4.2L Flat-6	77	+6 Laps
15	GTLM	25	(United States) BMW Team RLL	(Canada) Bruno Spengler (United States) Connor De Phillippi	BMW M8 GTE	77	+6 Laps
15	GTLM	25	(United States) BMW Team RLL	(Canada) Bruno Spengler (United States) Connor De Phillippi	BMW S63 4.0L Turbo V8	77	+6 Laps
16	GTLM	24	(United States) BMW Team RLL	(Finland) Jesse Krohn (United States) John Edwards	BMW M8 GTE	77	+6 Laps
16	GTLM	24	(United States) BMW Team RLL	(Finland) Jesse Krohn (United States) John Edwards	BMW S63 4.0L Turbo V8	77	+6 Laps
17	GTLM	911	(United States) Porsche GT Team	(United Kingdom) Nick Tandy (France) Frédéric Makowiecki	Porsche 911 RSR-19	77	+6 Laps
17	GTLM	911	(United States) Porsche GT Team	(United Kingdom) Nick Tandy (France) Frédéric Makowiecki	Porsche 4.2L Flat-6	77	+6 Laps
18	**GTD**	**14**	**(United States) AIM Vasser Sullivan**	**(United States) Aaron Telitz (United Kingdom) Jack Hawksworth**	**Lexus RC F GT3**	**75**	**+8 Laps‡**
18	**GTD**	**14**	**(United States) AIM Vasser Sullivan**	**(United States) Aaron Telitz (United Kingdom) Jack Hawksworth**	**Lexus 5.0L V8**	**75**	**+8 Laps‡**
19	GTD	63	(United States) Scuderia Corsa	(United States) Cooper MacNeil (Finland) Toni Vilander	Ferrari 488 GT3	75	+8 Laps
19	GTD	63	(United States) Scuderia Corsa	(United States) Cooper MacNeil (Finland) Toni Vilander	Ferrari F154CB 3.9L Turbo V8	75	+8 Laps
20	GTD	96	(United States) Turner Motorsport	(United States) Robby Foley (United States) Bill Auberlen	BMW M6 GT3	75	+8 Laps
20	GTD	96	(United States) Turner Motorsport	(United States) Robby Foley (United States) Bill Auberlen	BMW 4.4L Turbo V8	75	+8 Laps
21	GTD	74	(United States) Riley Motorsport	(United States) Gar Robinson (United States) Lawson Aschenbach	Mercedes-AMG GT3 Evo	75	+8 Laps
21	GTD	74	(United States) Riley Motorsport	(United States) Gar Robinson (United States) Lawson Aschenbach	Mercedes-AMG M159 6.2L V8	75	+8 Laps
22	GTD	12	(United States) AIM Vasser Sullivan	(United States) Frankie Montecalvo (United States) Townsend Bell	Lexus RC F GT3	75	+8 Laps
22	GTD	12	(United States) AIM Vasser Sullivan	(United States) Frankie Montecalvo (United States) Townsend Bell	Lexus 5.0L V8	75	+8 Laps
23	GTD	76	(United States) Compass Racing	(United States) Corey Fergus (United States) Paul Holton	McLaren 720S GT3	74	+9 Laps
23	GTD	76	(United States) Compass Racing	(United States) Corey Fergus (United States) Paul Holton	McLaren M840T 4.0L Turbo V8	74	+9 Laps
24	GTD	22	(United States) Gradient Racing	(United Kingdom) Till Bechtolsheimer (United States) Marc Miller	Acura NSX GT3 Evo	74	+9 Laps
24	GTD	22	(United States) Gradient Racing	(United Kingdom) Till Bechtolsheimer (United States) Marc Miller	Acura 3.5L Turbo V6	74	+9 Laps
25	GTD	30	(United States) Team Hardpoint	(United States) Rob Ferriol (United States) Spencer Pumpelly	Audi R8 LMS Evo	73	+10 Laps
25	GTD	30	(United States) Team Hardpoint	(United States) Rob Ferriol (United States) Spencer Pumpelly	Audi 5.2L V10	73	+10 Laps
26	GTD	16	(United States) Wright Motorsports	(United States) Ryan Hardwick (United States) Patrick Long	Porsche 911 GT3 R	71	+12 Laps
26	GTD	16	(United States) Wright Motorsports	(United States) Ryan Hardwick (United States) Patrick Long	Porsche 4.0L Flat-6	71	+12 Laps
27	LMP2	8	(United Kingdom) Tower Motorsport by Starworks	(Canada) John Farano (United Kingdom) Ryan Dalziel	Oreca 07	49	+34 Laps
27	LMP2	8	(United Kingdom) Tower Motorsport by Starworks	(Canada) John Farano (United Kingdom) Ryan Dalziel	Gibson GK428 4.2 L V8	49	+34 Laps
28	LMP2	81	(United States) DragonSpeed USA	(Sweden) Henrik Hedman (United States) Gustavo Menezes	Oreca 07	81	Disqualified (Note: The No. 81 DragonSpeed Oreca was disqualified for failing to meet minimum drive time thresholds.)
28	LMP2	81	(United States) DragonSpeed USA	(Sweden) Henrik Hedman (United States) Gustavo Menezes	Gibson GK428 4.2 L V8	81	Disqualified
29 DNF	GTD	44	(United States) GRT Magnus Racing Team	(United States) John Potter (United States) Andy Lally	Lamborghini Huracán GT3 Evo	40	Differential
29 DNF	GTD	44	(United States) GRT Magnus Racing Team	(United States) John Potter (United States) Andy Lally	Lamborghini 5.2L V10	40	Differential

== Standings after the race ==
DPi Drivers' Championship standings
Pos.	+/–	Driver	Points
1	1	(Australia) Ryan Briscoe (Netherlands) Renger van der Zande	92
2	1	(United Kingdom) Oliver Jarvis (United States) Tristan Nunez	92
3	1	(France) Sébastien Bourdais (Portugal) João Barbosa	90
4	1	(United States) Jonathan Bomarito (United Kingdom) Harry Tincknell	86
5	2	(Brazil) Pipo Derani	85

LMP2 Drivers' Championship standings
Pos.	Driver	Points
1	(United States) Patrick Kelly (United States) Spencer Pigot	35
2	(Canada) Cameron Cassels (United States) Kyle Masson	32
3	(United States) Dwight Merriman (United Kingdom) Kyle Tilley	30
4	(Canada) John Farano (United Kingdom) Ryan Dalziel	28
5	(Sweden) Henrik Hedman (United States) Gustavo Menezes	26

GTLM Drivers' Championship standings
Pos.	+/–	Driver	Points
1	1	(Spain) Antonio García (United States) Jordan Taylor	95
2	1	(New Zealand) Earl Bamber (Belgium) Laurens Vanthoor	94
3		(United States) John Edwards (Finland) Jesse Krohn	86
4	2	(United Kingdom) Oliver Gavin (United States) Tommy Milner	85
5	1	(France) Frédéric Makowiecki (United Kingdom) Nick Tandy	85

GTD Drivers' Championship standings
Pos.	+/–	Driver	Points
1		(United Kingdom) Jack Hawksworth	57‡
2		(United States) Aaron Telitz	54‡
3		(United States) Andy Lally (United States) John Potter	54‡
4		(United States) Ryan Hardwick (United States) Patrick Long	52‡
5		(United States) Townsend Bell (United States) Frankie Montecalvo	51‡

- ‡: Points count towards WeatherTech Sprint Cup championship only.
- Note: Only the top five positions are included for all sets of standings.

DPi Teams' Championship standings
Pos.	+/–	Team	Points
1	1	(United States) #10 Konica Minolta Cadillac DPi-V.R	92
2	1	(Canada) #77 Mazda Motorsports	92
3	1	(United States) #5 Mustang Sampling Racing / JDC-Miller MotorSports	90
4	1	(Canada) #55 Mazda Motorsports	86
5	2	(United States) #31 Whelen Engineering Racing	85

LMP2 Teams' Championship standings
Pos.	Team	Points
1	(United States) #52 PR1/Mathiasen Motorsports	35
2	(United States) #38 Performance Tech Motorsports	32
3	(United States) #18 Era Motorsport	30
4	(United States) #8 Tower Motorsport by Starworks	28
5	(United States) #81 DragonSpeed USA	26

GTLM Teams' Championship standings
Pos.	+/–	Team	Points
1	1	(United States) #3 Corvette Racing	95
2	1	(United States) #912 Porsche GT Team	94
3		(United States) #24 BMW Team RLL	86
4	2	(United States) #4 Corvette Racing	85
5	1	(United States) #911 Porsche GT Team	85

GTD Teams' Championship standings
Pos.	+/–	Team	Points
1		(Canada) #14 AIM Vasser Sullivan	57‡
2		(United States) #44 GRT Magnus	54‡
3		(United States) #16 Wright Motorsports	52
4		(Canada) #12 AIM Vasser Sullivan	51‡
5		(United States) #86 Meyer Shank Racing with Curb-Agajanian	51‡

- ‡: Points count towards WeatherTech Sprint Cup championship only.
- Note: Only the top five positions are included for all sets of standings.

DPi Manufacturers' Championship standings
Pos.	+/–	Manufacturer	Points
1		(United States) Cadillac	102
2		(Japan) Mazda	99
3		(Japan) Acura	90

GTLM Manufacturers' Championship standings
Pos.	+/–	Manufacturer	Points
1	1	(United States) Chevrolet	100
2	1	(Germany) Porsche	96
3	2	(Germany) BMW	95
4		(Italy) Ferrari	28

GTD Manufacturers' Championship standings
Pos.	+/–	Manufacturer	Points
1		(Italy) Lamborghini	59‡
2		(Japan) Lexus	59‡
3		(Japan) Acura	57‡
4		(Germany) Porsche	56‡
5		(Italy) Ferrari	56‡

- ‡: Points count towards WeatherTech Sprint Cup championship only.
- Note: Only the top five positions are included for all sets of standings.

IMSA SportsCar Championship
Previous race: 2020 WeatherTech 240	2020 season	Next race: 2020 IMSA SportsCar Weekend
