= 2020 WeatherTech 240 =

Second round of the 2020 IMSA SportsCar Championship season

Track map of Daytona International Speedway

The 2020 WeatherTech 240 was a sports car race sanctioned by the International Motor Sports Association (IMSA). The race was held at the Daytona International Speedway combined road course in Daytona Beach, Florida, on July 4, 2020. This race was the second round of the 2020 WeatherTech SportsCar Championship, and the first round of the 2020 WeatherTech Sprint Cup.

Taylor and García's GTLM class victory marked the first victory for the new Corvette C8.R, alongside Corvette Racing's 100th win in IMSA competition. The race was also just the 12th caution-free race since the merger in 2014.

== Background ==
Daytona International Speedway, where the race was held.

The race was the first for the series following the suspension due to the COVID-19 pandemic, and was initially announced to be run behind closed doors. However, it was later announced that a maximum of 5,000 fans were to be admitted, with all required to be residents of the state of Florida. The race was also the first time since 2010 that the WeatherTech SportsCar Championship or its previous series had competed in the Paul Revere 250 Independence Day event.

Before the race, Ryan Briscoe, Renger van der Zande, Scott Dixon, and Kamui Kobayashi led the DPi Drivers' Championship with 35 points each, ahead of Oliver Jarvis, Tristan Nunez, and Olivier Pla with 32 points each, and Sébastien Bourdais, João Barbosa, and Loïc Duval with 30 points each. With 35 points, the GTLM Drivers' Championship was led by John Edwards, Jesse Krohn, Augusto Farfus, and Chaz Mostert with a three-point advantage over Earl Bamber, Laurens Vanthoor, and Mathieu Jaminet. In GTD, the Drivers' Championship was led by Bryan Sellers, Madison Snow, Corey Lewis, and Andrea Caldarelli with 35 points, ahead of Andy Lally, John Potter, Spencer Pumpelly, and Marco Mapelli with 32 points each. Cadillac, BMW, and Lamborghini were leading their respective Manufacturers' Championships, while Konica Minolta Cadillac DPi-V.R, BMW Team RLL, and Paul Miller Racing each led their own Teams' Championships.

=== Entries ===
A total of 26 cars took part in the event, down from the 39 entries from the season's opening event. There were 8 cars in the DPi class, 6 cars in the GTLM class, and 12 cars in the GTD class. In DPi, Gabby Chaves filled in for Felipe Nasr in the Whelen Engineering Racing entry, due to Nasr testing positive for COVID-19. Multimatic Motorsports took over the Mazda DPi program from Joest Racing. The LMP2 class did not participate in the event. In GTLM, Risi Competizione were absent. In GTD, Paul Miller Racing, the GTD class winner in the Rolex 24, didn't enter the event due to effects of the pandemic. Likewise, Pfaff Motorsports also didn't enter, due to travel restrictions surrounding being based in Canada. The No. 19 GEAR Racing powered by GRT Grasser entry, the No. 91 of Wright Motorsports, and the No. 23 Heart of Racing Team Aston Martin all declined to enter the event as well. Team Hardpoint made their series debut, and Gradient Racing returned for the first time since 2018. Prior to the event, Aaron Telitz was announced as the replacement for Parker Chase in the No. 14 entry for AIM Vasser Sullivan. Compass Racing made their season debut.

== Practice ==
There were two practice sessions preceding the start of the race on Saturday, one on Friday and one on Saturday. The first session on Friday lasted one hour while the second session on Saturday lasted 75 minutes.

=== Practice 1 ===
The first practice session took place at 6:15 pm ET on Friday and ended with Juan Pablo Montoya topping the charts for Acura Team Penske, with a lap time of 1:35.960. The GTLM class was topped by the #912 Porsche GT Team Porsche 911 RSR-19 of Laurens Vanthoor with a time of 1:44.003. Tommy Milner in the #4 Corvette Racing entry was second and Nick Tandy rounded out the top 3. The GTD class was topped by the #63 Scuderia Corsa Ferrari 488 GT3 of Toni Vilander with a time of 1:47.481.

Pos.	Class	No.	Team	Driver	Time	Gap
1	DPi	6	Acura Team Penske	Juan Pablo Montoya	1:35.960	_
2	DPi	31	Whelen Engineering Racing	Pipo Derani	1:35.976	+0.016
3	DPi	55	Mazda Motorsports	Harry Tincknell	1:36.013	+0.053

=== Practice 2 ===
The second and final practice session took place at 10:15 am ET on Saturday and ended with Oliver Jarvis topping the charts for Mazda Motorsports, with a lap time of 1:34.398. The GTLM class was topped by the #911 Porsche GT Team Porsche 911 RSR-19 of Nick Tandy with a time of 1:42.990. Oliver Gavin in the #4 Corvette Racing entry was second and Jordan Taylor rounded out the top 3. The GTD class was topped by the #14 AIM Vasser Sullivan Lexus RC F GT3 of Aaron Telitz with a time of 1:46.694.

Pos.	Class	No.	Team	Driver	Time	Gap
1	DPi	77	Mazda Motorsports	Oliver Jarvis	1:34.398	_
2	DPi	7	Acura Team Penske	Hélio Castroneves	1:34.646	+0.248
3	DPi	55	Mazda Motorsports	Jonathan Bomarito	1:34.689	+0.291

== Qualifying ==
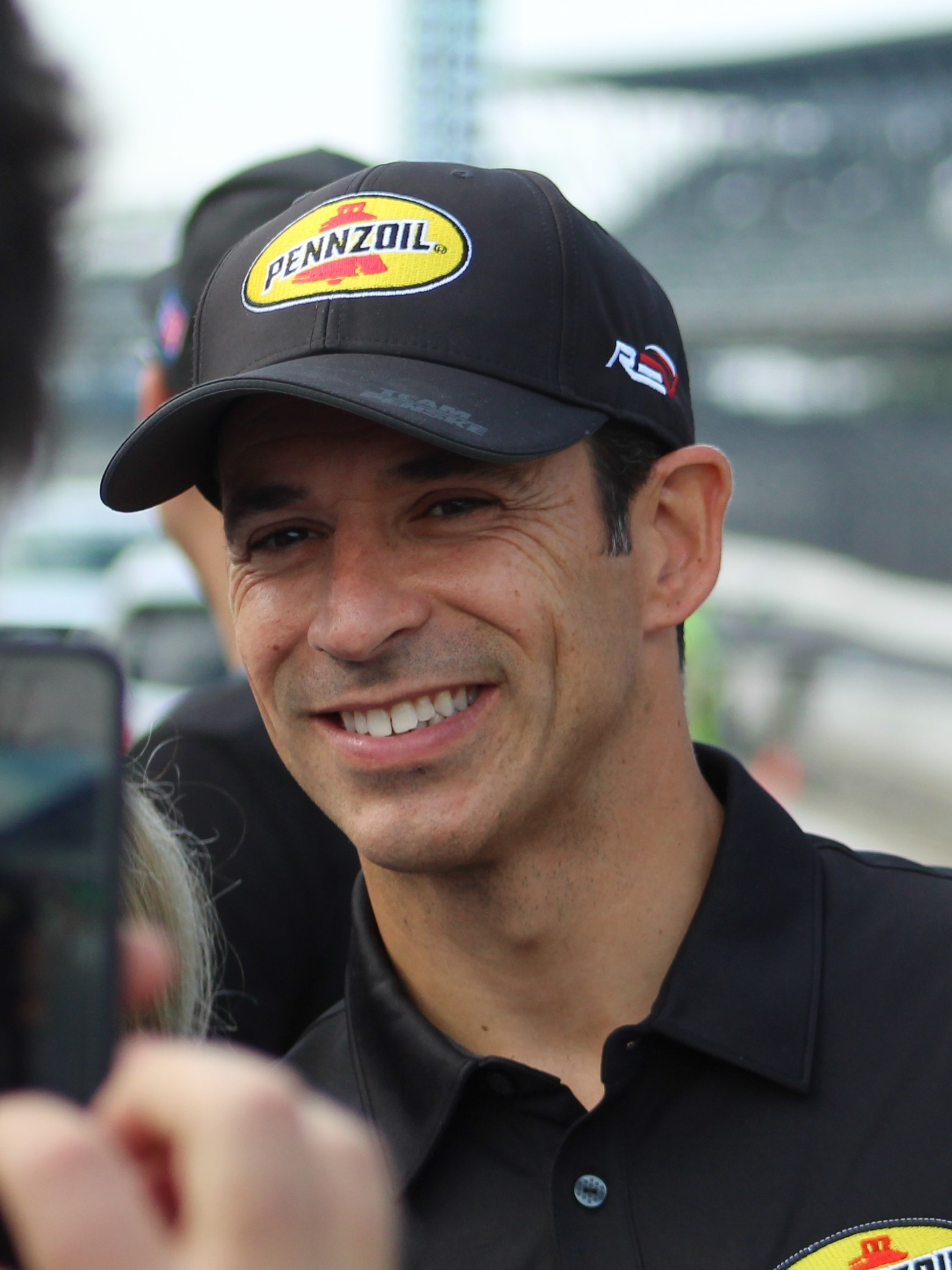
Hélio Castroneves (pictured in 2018) took the overall pole position for Acura Team Penske.

Saturday's afternoon qualifying was broken into three sessions, with one session for the DPi, GTLM, and GTD classes, which lasted for 15 minutes each, and a ten minute interval between the sessions. The rules dictated that all teams nominated a driver to qualify their cars, with the Pro-Am (GTD) class requiring a Bronze/Silver Rated Driver to qualify the car. The competitors' fastest lap times determined the starting order. IMSA then arranged the grid to put DPis ahead of the GTLM and GTD cars.

Qualifying was broken into three sessions. The first was for cars in GTD class. Corey Fergus qualified on pole for the class driving the #76 car for Compass Racing, beating Aaron Telitz in the #14 AIM Vasser Sullivan entry by less than two tenths of a second.

The second session of qualifying was for cars in the GTLM class. Oliver Gavin qualified on pole driving the #4 car for Corvette Racing, besting Jordan Taylor in the sister #3 Corvette Racing entry.

The final session of qualifying was for the DPi class. Hélio Castroneves qualified on pole driving the #7 car for Acura Team Penske, beating Oliver Jarvis in the #77 Mazda Motorsports by less than fifty-hundredths of a second.

=== Qualifying results ===
Pole positions in each class are indicated in bold and by ‡.

Pos.	Class	No.	Team	Driver	Time	Gap	Grid
1	**DPi**	**7**	**(United States) Acura Team Penske**	**(Brazil) Hélio Castroneves**	**1:34.390**	**_**	1‡
2	DPi	77	(Canada) Mazda Motorsports	(United Kingdom) Oliver Jarvis	1:34.422	+0.032	2
3	DPi	55	(Canada) Mazda Motorsports	(United States) Jonathan Bomarito	1:34.454	+0.064	3
4	DPi	6	(United States) Acura Team Penske	(Colombia) Juan Pablo Montoya	1:34.532	+0.142	4
5	DPi	10	Konica Minolta Cadillac	(Australia) Ryan Briscoe	1:35.061	+0.671	5
6	DPi	31	(United States) Whelen Engineering Racing	(Colombia) Gabby Chaves	1:35.244	+0.854	6
7	DPi	5	(United States) JDC-Mustang Sampling Racing	(Portugal) João Barbosa	1:35.737	+1.347	7
8	DPi	85	(United States) JDC-Miller MotorSports	(United States) Chris Miller	1:35.945	+1.555	8
9	**GTLM**	**4**	**(United States) Corvette Racing**	**(United Kingdom) Oliver Gavin**	**1:42.251**	**+7.861**	9‡
10	GTLM	3	(United States) Corvette Racing	(United States) Jordan Taylor	1:42.523	+8.133	10
11	GTLM	24	(United States) BMW Team RLL	(Finland) Jesse Krohn	1:42.628	+8.238	11
12	GTLM	912	(United States) Porsche GT Team	(Belgium) Laurens Vanthoor	1:42.629	+8.239	12
13	GTLM	25	(United States) BMW Team RLL	(Canada) Bruno Spengler	1:42.674	+8.284	13
14	GTLM	911	(United States) Porsche GT Team	(United Kingdom) Nick Tandy	1:42.754	+8.364	14
15	**GTD**	**76**	**(United States) Compass Racing**	**(United States) Corey Fergus**	**1:47.015**	**+12.625**	15‡
16	GTD	14	(Canada) AIM Vasser Sullivan	(United States) Aaron Telitz	1:47.152	+12.762	16
17	GTD	96	(United States) Turner Motorsport	(United States) Robby Foley	1:47.468	+13.078	17
18	GTD	12	(Canada) AIM Vasser Sullivan	(United States) Frankie Montecalvo	1:47.502	+13.112	18
19	GTD	63	(United States) Scuderia Corsa	(United States) Cooper MacNeil	1:47.595	+13.205	19
20	GTD	86	(United States) Meyer Shank Racing with Curb-Agajanian	(United States) Matt McMurry	1:47.779	+13.389	20
21	GTD	57	(United States) Heinricher Racing with MSR Curb-Agajanian	(Canada) Misha Goikhberg	1:47.799	+13.409	21
22	GTD	16	(United States) Wright Motorsports	(United States) Ryan Hardwick	1:47.839	+13.449	22
23	GTD	74	(United States) Riley Motorsports	(United States) Gar Robinson	1:47.998	+13.608	23
24	GTD	44	(United States) GRT Magnus	(United States) John Potter	1:48.772	+14.382	26^{1}
25	GTD	22	(United States) Gradient Racing	(United Kingdom) Till Bechtolsheimer	1:48.795	+14.405	24
26	GTD	30	(United States) Team Hardpoint	(United States) Rob Ferriol	1:49.193	+14.803	25
Sources:

- ^{1} The No. 44 GRT Magnus entry was moved to the back of the GTD field as per Article 40.1.4 of the Sporting regulations (Change of starting tires).

== Race ==
=== Post-race ===
As a result of winning the race, Bomarito and Tincknell advanced from sixth to third in the DPi Drivers' Championship. Jarvis and Nunez jumped from second to first while Briscoe and van der Zande dropped from first to second. In GTLM, Bamber and Vanthoor jumped to first after being second coming into the event. Edwards and Krohn dropped from first to third while Antonio García and Jordan Taylor advanced from fourth to second. As a result of winning the race, Hawksworth advanced from eighth to first in the GTD Drivers' Championship. Telitz jumped from twelfth to second while Lally and Potter dropped from second to third. Bell and Montecalvo jumped to fifth after being from twelfth coming into the event. Cadillac, BMW, and Lamborghini continued to top their respective Manufacturers' Championships while Mazda Motorsports, Porsche GT Team, and AIM Vasser Sullivan became the leaders of their respective class Teams' Championships with nine rounds remaining in the season.

=== Result ===
Due to a lightning storm, the race start was delayed. While the race was originally scheduled to end at sunset, a considerable portion of the race ended up running after dark. The race ran full course caution free.

Class winners are denoted in bold and ‡.

Pos	Class	No.	Team	Drivers	Chassis	Laps	Time/Retired
Pos	Class	No.	Team	Drivers	Engine	Laps	Time/Retired
1	**DPi**	**55**	**(Canada) Mazda Motorsports**	**(United States) Jonathan Bomarito (United Kingdom) Harry Tincknell**	**Mazda RT24-P**	**95**	**2:40:11.281‡**
1	**DPi**	**55**	**(Canada) Mazda Motorsports**	**(United States) Jonathan Bomarito (United Kingdom) Harry Tincknell**	**Mazda MZ-2.0T 2.0 L Turbo I4**	**95**	**2:40:11.281‡**
2	DPi	77	(Canada) Mazda Motorsports	(United Kingdom) Oliver Jarvis (United States) Tristan Nunez	Mazda RT24-P	95	+10.168s
2	DPi	77	(Canada) Mazda Motorsports	(United Kingdom) Oliver Jarvis (United States) Tristan Nunez	Mazda MZ-2.0T 2.0 L Turbo I4	95	+10.168s
3	DPi	5	(United States) JDC-Mustang Sampling Racing	(Portugal) João Barbosa (France) Sébastien Bourdais	Cadillac DPi-V.R	95	+15.378s
3	DPi	5	(United States) JDC-Mustang Sampling Racing	(Portugal) João Barbosa (France) Sébastien Bourdais	Cadillac 5.5 L V8	95	+15.378s
4	DPi	6	(United States) Acura Team Penske	(Colombia) Juan Pablo Montoya (United States) Dane Cameron	Acura ARX-05	95	+27.335s
4	DPi	6	(United States) Acura Team Penske	(Colombia) Juan Pablo Montoya (United States) Dane Cameron	Acura AR35TT 3.5 L Turbo V6	95	+27.335s
5	DPi	31	(United States) Whelen Engineering Racing	(Colombia) Gabby Chaves (Brazil) Pipo Derani	Cadillac DPi-V.R	95	+31.275s
5	DPi	31	(United States) Whelen Engineering Racing	(Colombia) Gabby Chaves (Brazil) Pipo Derani	Cadillac 5.5 L V8	95	+31.275s
6	DPi	10	(United States) Konica Minolta Cadillac	(Netherlands) Renger van der Zande (Australia) Ryan Briscoe	Cadillac DPi-V.R	95	+1:06.779
6	DPi	10	(United States) Konica Minolta Cadillac	(Netherlands) Renger van der Zande (Australia) Ryan Briscoe	Cadillac 5.5 L V8	95	+1:06.779
7	DPi	85	(United States) JDC-Miller MotorSports	(United States) Chris Miller (France) Tristan Vautier	Cadillac DPi-V.R	95	+1:18.511
7	DPi	85	(United States) JDC-Miller MotorSports	(United States) Chris Miller (France) Tristan Vautier	Cadillac 5.5 L V8	95	+1:18.511
8	**GTLM**	**3**	**(United States) Corvette Racing**	**(United States) Jordan Taylor (Spain) Antonio García**	**Chevrolet Corvette C8.R**	**90**	**+5 Laps‡**
8	**GTLM**	**3**	**(United States) Corvette Racing**	**(United States) Jordan Taylor (Spain) Antonio García**	**Chevrolet 5.5 L V8**	**90**	**+5 Laps‡**
9	GTLM	912	(United States) Porsche GT Team	(New Zealand) Earl Bamber (Belgium) Laurens Vanthoor	Porsche 911 RSR-19	90	+5 Laps
9	GTLM	912	(United States) Porsche GT Team	(New Zealand) Earl Bamber (Belgium) Laurens Vanthoor	Porsche 4.2 L Flat-6	90	+5 Laps
10	GTLM	911	(United States) Porsche GT Team	(France) Frédéric Makowiecki (United Kingdom) Nick Tandy	Porsche 911 RSR-19	90	+5 Laps
10	GTLM	911	(United States) Porsche GT Team	(France) Frédéric Makowiecki (United Kingdom) Nick Tandy	Porsche 4.2 L Flat-6	90	+5 Laps
11	GTLM	25	(United States) BMW Team RLL	(United States) Connor De Phillippi (Canada) Bruno Spengler	BMW M8 GTE	90	+5 Laps
11	GTLM	25	(United States) BMW Team RLL	(United States) Connor De Phillippi (Canada) Bruno Spengler	BMW S63 4.0 L Turbo V8	90	+5 Laps
12	GTLM	4	(United States) Corvette Racing	(United Kingdom) Oliver Gavin (United States) Tommy Milner	Chevrolet Corvette C8.R	89	+6 Laps
12	GTLM	4	(United States) Corvette Racing	(United Kingdom) Oliver Gavin (United States) Tommy Milner	Chevrolet 5.5 L V8	89	+6 Laps
13	GTLM	24	(United States) BMW Team RLL	(United States) John Edwards (Finland) Jesse Krohn	BMW M8 GTE	89	+6 Laps
13	GTLM	24	(United States) BMW Team RLL	(United States) John Edwards (Finland) Jesse Krohn	BMW S63 4.0 L Turbo V8	89	+6 Laps
14	**GTD**	**14**	**(Canada) AIM Vasser Sullivan**	**(United Kingdom) Jack Hawksworth (United States) Aaron Telitz**	**Lexus RC F GT3**	**87**	**+8 Laps‡**
14	**GTD**	**14**	**(Canada) AIM Vasser Sullivan**	**(United Kingdom) Jack Hawksworth (United States) Aaron Telitz**	**Lexus 5.0 L V8**	**87**	**+8 Laps‡**
15	GTD	12	(Canada) AIM Vasser Sullivan	(United States) Frankie Montecalvo (United States) Townsend Bell	Lexus RC F GT3	86	+9 Laps
15	GTD	12	(Canada) AIM Vasser Sullivan	(United States) Frankie Montecalvo (United States) Townsend Bell	Lexus 5.0 L V8	86	+9 Laps
16	GTD	86	(United States) Meyer Shank Racing with Curb-Agajanian	(Germany) Mario Farnbacher (United States) Matt McMurry	Acura NSX GT3 Evo	86	+9 Laps
16	GTD	86	(United States) Meyer Shank Racing with Curb-Agajanian	(Germany) Mario Farnbacher (United States) Matt McMurry	Acura 3.5 L Turbo V6	86	+9 Laps
17	GTD	57	(United States) Heinricher Racing with MSR Curb-Agajanian	(Portugal) Álvaro Parente (Canada) Mikhail Goikhberg	Acura NSX GT3 Evo	86	+9 Laps
17	GTD	57	(United States) Heinricher Racing with MSR Curb-Agajanian	(Portugal) Álvaro Parente (Canada) Mikhail Goikhberg	Acura 3.5 L Turbo V6	86	+9 Laps
18	GTD	63	(United States) Scuderia Corsa	(United States) Cooper MacNeil (Finland) Toni Vilander	Ferrari 488 GT3	86	+9 Laps
18	GTD	63	(United States) Scuderia Corsa	(United States) Cooper MacNeil (Finland) Toni Vilander	Ferrari F154CB 3.9 L Turbo V8	86	+9 Laps
19	GTD	74	(United States) Riley Motorsports	(United States) Lawson Aschenbach (United States) Gar Robinson	Mercedes-AMG GT3 Evo	85	+10 Laps
19	GTD	74	(United States) Riley Motorsports	(United States) Lawson Aschenbach (United States) Gar Robinson	Mercedes-AMG M159 6.2 L V8	85	+10 Laps
20	GTD	16	(United States) Wright Motorsports	(United States) Ryan Hardwick (United States) Patrick Long	Porsche 911 GT3 R	85	+10 Laps
20	GTD	16	(United States) Wright Motorsports	(United States) Ryan Hardwick (United States) Patrick Long	Porsche 4.0 L Flat-6	85	+10 Laps
21	GTD	96	(United States) Turner Motorsport	(United States) Robby Foley (United States) Bill Auberlen	BMW M6 GT3	85	+10 Laps
21	GTD	96	(United States) Turner Motorsport	(United States) Robby Foley (United States) Bill Auberlen	BMW 4.4 L Turbo V8	85	+10 Laps
22	GTD	44	(United States) GRT Magnus	(United States) John Potter (United States) Andy Lally	Lamborghini Huracán GT3 Evo	85	+10 Laps
22	GTD	44	(United States) GRT Magnus	(United States) John Potter (United States) Andy Lally	Lamborghini 5.2 L V10	85	+10 Laps
23	GTD	22	(United States) Gradient Racing	(United Kingdom) Till Bechtolsheimer (United States) Marc Miller	Acura NSX GT3 Evo	85	+10 Laps
23	GTD	22	(United States) Gradient Racing	(United Kingdom) Till Bechtolsheimer (United States) Marc Miller	Acura 3.5 L Turbo V6	85	+10 Laps
24	GTD	76	(United States) Compass Racing	(United States) Corey Fergus (United States) Paul Holton	McLaren 720S GT3	85	+10 Laps
24	GTD	76	(United States) Compass Racing	(United States) Corey Fergus (United States) Paul Holton	McLaren M840T 4.0 L Turbo V8	85	+10 Laps
25	GTD	30	(United States) Team Hardpoint	(United States) Rob Ferriol (United States) Spencer Pumpelly	Audi R8 LMS Evo	84	+11 Laps
25	GTD	30	(United States) Team Hardpoint	(United States) Rob Ferriol (United States) Spencer Pumpelly	Audi 5.2 L V10	84	+11 Laps
26	DPi	7	(United States) Acura Team Penske	(Brazil) Hélio Castroneves (United States) Ricky Taylor	Acura ARX-05	43	Engine
26	DPi	7	(United States) Acura Team Penske	(Brazil) Hélio Castroneves (United States) Ricky Taylor	Acura AR35TT 3.5 L Turbo V6	43	Engine

== Standings after the race ==
DPi Drivers' Championship standings
Pos.	+/–	Driver	Points
1	1	(United Kingdom) Oliver Jarvis (United States) Tristan Nunez	64
2	1	(Australia) Ryan Briscoe (Netherlands) Renger van der Zande	60
3	3	(United States) Jonathan Bomarito (United Kingdom) Harry Tincknell	60
4	1	(France) Sébastien Bourdais (Portugal) João Barbosa	60
5	1	(United States) Dane Cameron (Colombia) Juan Pablo Montoya	56

LMP2 Drivers' Championship standings
Pos.	Driver	Points
1	(United States) Colin Braun (Sweden) Henrik Hedman (United Kingdom) Ben Hanley (United Kingdom) Harrison Newey	0
2	(Switzerland) Simon Trummer (France) Gabriel Aubry (United States) Nicholas Boulle (United States) Ben Keating	0
3	(United States) Dwight Merriman (United Kingdom) Kyle Tilley (United Kingdom) Ryan Lewis (France) Nicolas Minassian	0
4	(Canada) John Farano (Denmark) David Heinemeier Hansson (United Kingdom) Ryan Dalziel (France) Nicolas Lapierre	0
5	(Canada) Cameron Cassels (United States) Kyle Masson (United States) Robert Masson (United States) Don Yount	0

GTLM Drivers' Championship standings
Pos.	+/–	Driver	Points
1	1	(New Zealand) Earl Bamber (Belgium) Laurens Vanthoor	64
2	2	(Spain) Antonio García (United States) Jordan Taylor	63
3	2	(United States) John Edwards (Finland) Jesse Krohn	60
4	1	(France) Frédéric Makowiecki (United Kingdom) Nick Tandy	60
5		(United States) Connor De Phillippi (Canada) Bruno Spengler	54

GTD Drivers' Championship standings
Pos.	+/–	Driver	Points
1	7	(United Kingdom) Jack Hawksworth	57
2	10	(United States) Aaron Telitz	54
3	1	(United States) Andy Lally (United States) John Potter	54
4		(United States) Ryan Hardwick (United States) Patrick Long	52
5	7	(United States) Townsend Bell (United States) Frankie Montecalvo	51

- Note: Only the top five positions are included for all sets of standings.

DPi Teams' Championship standings
Pos.	+/–	Team	Points
1	1	(Canada) #77 Mazda Motorsports	64
2	1	(United States) #10 Konica Minolta Cadillac DPi-V.R	60
3	3	(Canada) #55 Mazda Motorsports	60
4	1	(United States) #5 Mustang Sampling Racing / JDC-Miller MotorSports	60
5	1	(United States) #6 Acura Team Penske	56

LMP2 Teams' Championship standings
Pos.	Team	Points
1	(United States) #81 DragonSpeed USA	0
2	(United States) #52 PR1/Mathiasen Motorsports	0
3	(United States) #18 Era Motorsport	0
4	(United States) #8 Tower Motorsport by Starworks	0
5	(United States) #38 Performance Tech Motorsports	0

GTLM Teams' Championship standings
Pos.	+/–	Team	Points
1	1	(United States) #912 Porsche GT Team	64
2	2	(United States) #3 Corvette Racing	63
3	2	(United States) #24 BMW Team RLL	60
4	1	(United States) #911 Porsche GT Team	60
5		(United States) #25 BMW Team RLL	54

GTD Teams' Championship standings
Pos.	+/–	Team	Points
1	8	(Canada) #14 AIM Vasser Sullivan	57
2		(United States) #44 GRT Magnus	54
3	1	(United States) #16 Wright Motorsports	52
4	8	(Canada) #12 AIM Vasser Sullivan	51
5	5	(United States) #86 Meyer Shank Racing with Curb-Agajanian	51

- Note: Only the top five positions are included for all sets of standings.

DPi Manufacturers' Championship standings
Pos.	+/–	Manufacturer	Points
1		(United States) Cadillac	67
2		(Japan) Mazda	67
3		(Japan) Acura	60

GTLM Manufacturers' Championship standings
Pos.	+/–	Manufacturer	Points
1		(Germany) BMW	65
2	1	(United States) Chevrolet	65
3	1	(Germany) Porsche	64
4		(Italy) Ferrari	28

GTD Manufacturers' Championship standings
Pos.	+/–	Manufacturer	Points
1		(Italy) Lamborghini	59
2	5	(Japan) Lexus	59
3	3	(Japan) Acura	57
4	1	(Germany) Porsche	56
5		(Italy) Ferrari	56

- Note: Only the top five positions are included for all sets of standings.

IMSA SportsCar Championship
Previous race: 24 Hours of Daytona	2020 season	Next race: Cadillac Grand Prix of Sebring
