= John Potter (racing driver) =

Racing driver

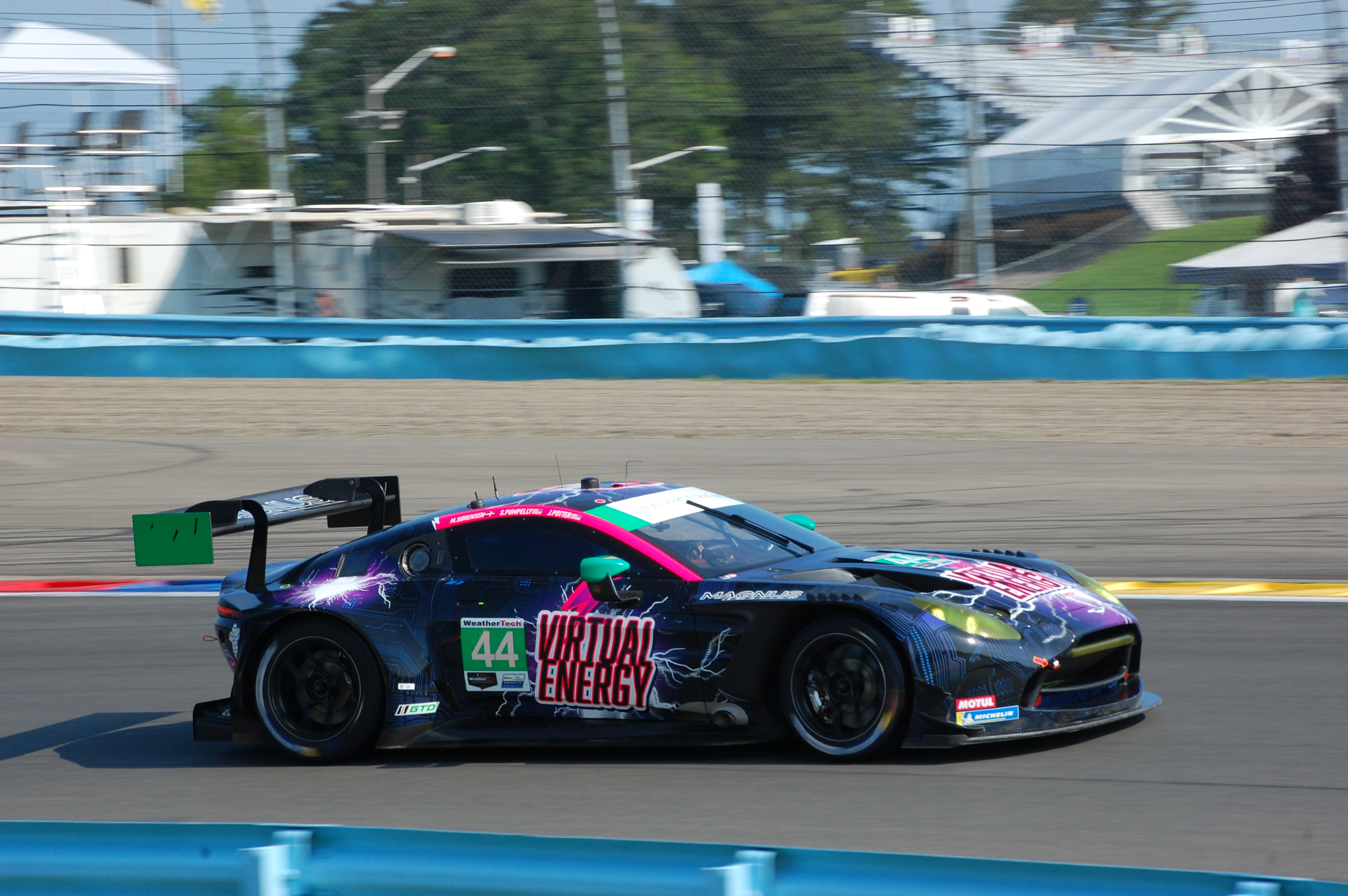
- Magnus in 2025
- Nationality: (United States) American
- Born: John Magnus Potter; February 25, 1982 (age 44) St. Louis, Missouri, U.S.

IMSA SportsCar Championship career
- Debut season: 2007
- Current team: Magnus Racing
- Categorisation: FIA Silver (until 2015); FIA Bronze (2016–)
- Car number: 44
- Wins: 6
- Podiums: 19

Previous series
- Pirelli World Challenge; Rolex Sports Car Series; American Le Mans Series

John Magnus Potter (born 25 February 1982) is a Salt Lake City based racing driver, team owner, and commercial real estate developer. He has become a known figure in both the professional sports car world as well as numerous hotel and self-storage ventures throughout Utah.

== Racing Career Origins ==
Potter is most known as the founder and co-driver of Magnus Racing, a two-decade competitor in the IMSA WeatherTech SportsCar Championship.

Following a long-time appreciation of cars, Potter's first exposure to motorsport came in 2006 with the Skip Barber Racing School, taking a course at the famed Lime Rock Park in Lakeville, CT. A rapid growth in the sport would follow suit, moving up to the professional ranks by 2007, participating in the GT Class of the Rolex Sports Car Series with noted organization The Racer's Group, making his debut at the highly touted Six Hours of the Glen, one of the signature events of American sports car racing .

Proving an instant fit with the team, John would continue with The Racer's Group and Farnbacher Loles Racing at select events throughout 2008, making the plunge to full-time racing in 2009.

It was in 2009 where Potter would come to prominence in professional sportscar racing, being teamed with veteran driver Craig Stanton in the Rolex GT ranks for the full season, as well as with Andy Lally in the supporting Continental Tire Sports Car Challenge series. It was with Lally where Potter would take his first professional racing win at Watkins Glen, only three years from first entering motorsport and within two years of entering the pro ranks.

== Magnus Racing: On-Track Story ==
Following the completion of the 2009 racing season, Potter decided to put his business acumen to use within motorsport, transitioning from driver to both driver and team owner, founding Magnus Racing in the fall of 2009. A new team in concept, Magnus Racing was made up of largely motorsport veterans, beginning with the hiring of co-driver Craig Stanton, a former series champion, as well as team director John Bedell, lead engineer Lars Giersing, and PR/marketing veteran Sean Heckman. To this day, John Bedell and Sean Heckman still remain contributing members of the team, several decades later.

Competing in both the 2010 Rolex Sports Car GT Championship as well as Continental Tire Sports Car Challenge, Magnus Racing began in partnership with Porsche Motorsport, campaigning the heralded Porsche 997 GT3 Cup in the premier GT category, as well as a street modified Porsche Cayman in the production-based Continental Challenge. While still gelling as a team, the team accrued several highlights, including a pole position at Watkins Glen. The team would also take part in a singular event in the American Le Mans Series, testing the waters at the season-ending Petit Le Mans.

2011 would continue as a growth season for the team, with Potter and Stanton participating in both a full season of Rolex GT competition as well as select American Le Mans Series events, accruing five podiums and becoming established as one of the premier Porsche teams in the country.

In 2012, Potter and Magnus Racing would enjoy a landmark year. With Andy Lally becoming available following a season in the NASCAR Cup Series, Potter sprung at the opportunity, signing Lally for the full 2012 season and proving instantly successful. 2012 would mark the 50th Running of the 24 Hours of Daytona, the most prestigious sportscar race in North America, where Magnus Racing would take a dominant victory. Six months later, the team would follow it up with a victory at the Inaugural Brickyard Grand Prix, the first endurance sportscar race in the history of Indianapolis Motor Speedway. The success, most notably at endurance races, led to the team winning the inaugural North American Endurance Championship, a specialized championship within the Rolex Series (and now IMSA) recognizing top endurance performances.

In 2013, the team would finish runner-up in the season-long Rolex GT Championship. It was a bitter conclusion after leading into the final round, only to be taken out by a car from The Racer's Group who had gone off course and re-joined dangerously.

2014 would mark a new era for the team and American sportscar racing, with the formation of the IMSA Tudor United SportsCar Championship, a new, fully-merged premier championship. In only the second round, Potter and his team would take yet another prestigious victory, this time at the famed 12 Hours of Sebring, with Potter and Andy Lally joined by new teammate Marco Seefried.

In 2016 Magnus Racing would depart from their long-time relationship with Porsche, forming a new relationship with Audi and the R8 LMS GT3. The relationship would kick off in an impressive way, winning on debut together at The Rolex 24 at Daytona, the team's second victory at the event. Six months later at Lime Rock Park, the team would take yet another victory, mounting a championship charge at the season's halfway point. Taking a podium just two races later at VIRginia International Raceway, Magnus was just five points from the championship lead and with a strong potential in the forthcoming races. Unfortunately, the team was disqualified from VIRginia due to a ride height infraction, with IMSA officials acknowledging that the car did pass in multiple places but one, and refusing to take into account dented bodywork due to contact. At the season finale at Petit Le Mans, the team took one additional checkered flag, unfortunately being disqualified yet again due to a different interpretation on drive-time requirements.

In 2017, frustration with IMSA officiating would send Potter and Magnus Racing to The Pirelli World Challenge Series, with Potter taking part in a combination of solo and shared races. For 2017, the team was joined by Audi specialist Pierre Kaffer, as well as Spencer Pumpelly and Marco Seefried for the shared races.

After a return to IMSA competition in 2018 with Audi, the team formed a new partnership with Lamborghini and the Huracan GT3 for 2019, continuing into 2020 in a joint partnership with Grasser Racing. During that time, the team would add to their podium tally with yet another podium at The Rolex 24.

In 2021, an opportunity was taken with Honda Performance Development to campaign the Acura NSX GT3 with Archangel Motorsports.

From 2022 to present, Potter and Magnus Racing elected to partner with Aston Martin Racing and the Vantage GT3. With Potter focusing on business away from the track and concentrating the team's resources, from 2022 to present the team has purely been focused on endurance racing, a more limited schedule where they can put additional resources. The focus has proven successful, achieving podium on debut at The Rolex 24 at Daytona, followed two more in four years, as well as additional podiums at events such as The Six Hours at the Glen. In 2026, the team led the Rolex 24 at Daytona en route to their third win, however contact would drop them to second with only 15 minutes remaining.

== Magnus Racing: Off-Track Story ==
While Magnus Racing has enjoyed many on-track successes, their success as one of the most fan-favorite teams off the track has largely been attributed to the humor and free guidance of John Potter.

Beginning with the team at Daytona in 2011, the first of their inaugural "movie poster" themes has appeared at every Rolex 24 since. With this tradition, the team parodies a movie and places its drivers and team members in various roles. This has become an anticipated fan event every year.

In 2012, the team debuted a one-of-a-kind pre-season video that has continued through today. The video themes have ranged from humorous, to serious, to surreal. Their most notable have included a video in 2014 heavily utilizing the tilt-shift effect to make the Daytona 24 appear to be a toy car track, a video in 2016 featuring stop-motion animation in the style of a famed brick figure company, and a fan-appreciation mini documentary in 2019.

Additionally in 2012, the team debuted a live pitside webstream that broadcast from the team's pit stall through the entirety of The Rolex 24. The stream included team radio, access and interviews to team members and paddock celebrities at large, and was touted for giving fans unprecedented access. This went from 2012-2019, and returned in 2025.

In 2014, the team would begin a new tradition at Sebring tailing off of their Daytona 24 theme, creating a parody album cover from famous music albums, replacing the musicians with team drivers and personnel.

Additionally, the team has become synonymous with comical press releases and one-off videos through the years, ranging from creating a parody take on "Tinder," known as "Spinder," for finding available drivers, to multiple press releases that take on hot topics in both motorsport and pop culture.

In 2014, Magnus Racing received the "Microsoft Team to Win" Award, a fan-voted award for favorite highlights of the year. The rabid fan base of Magnus Racing outvoted such famous brands as Corvette Racing and Hollywood actor Patrick Dempsey's Dempsey Racing team.

== Business career ==
Concurrent with his racing endeavors, Potter has become an influential commercial real estate developer in Salt Lake City and the surrounding Utah areas.

Following the purchase of assorted commercial leasing properties, Potter formed a new venture in Magnus Storage Properties, a self-storage development and management company that specializes in personal self-storage throughout the area. At present, Magnus Storage Properties owns and operates seven different self-storage locations across Utah, including: Holladay, Tooele, West Jordan, Logan, and beyond.

As his self-storage enterprises continued to grow, Potter's next real estate venture expanded into hotel development and management, forming Magnus Commercial Properties and Magnus Hotel Management.

At present, Magnus Hotel Management looks after a number of hotel brands and properties across Salt Lake City and the greater Utah area, working with brands such as Marriot (Fairfield Inn & Suites), Choice (Comfort Inn & Suites), and Hilton (Home2Suites, Tru).

Additionally, Potter has been in the process of developing a hotel project, currently under the working title of "Sugar House Hotel," a boutique hotel experience encapsulating the character and flavor of Salt Lake City's Sugar House district, which has personal meaning to him.

== Racing record ==
=== Career summary ===
Season	Series	Team	Races	Wins	Poles	F/Laps	Podiums	Points	Position
2007	Rolex Sports Car Series - GT	The Racer's Group	2	0	0	0	0		
2008	Rolex Sports Car Series - GT	The Racer's Group	3	0	0	0	0		
2008	Rolex Sports Car Series - GT	Farnbacher Loles Racing	1	0	0	0	0		
2009	Rolex Sports Car Series - GT	Riegel/Stanton/The Racer's Group	11	0	0	0	0	271	10th
2009	Rolex Sports Car Series - GT	The Racer's Group	1	0	0	0	0	271	10th
2010	American Le Mans Series - GTC	Magnus Racing	1	0	0	0	1		
2010	Rolex Sports Car Series - GT	Magnus Racing	12	0	0	0	0	240	12th
2011	American Le Mans Series - GTC	Magnus Racing	4	0	0	0	3	53	12th
2011	Rolex Sports Car Series - GT	Magnus Racing	12	0	0	0	2	301	6th
2012	Rolex Sports Car Series - GT	Magnus Racing	13	2	0	0	4	323	7th
2013	Rolex Sports Car Series - GT	Magnus Racing	12	1	0	0	5	331	**2nd**
2014	United SportsCar Championship - GTD	Magnus Racing	11	1	0	0	5	272	8th
2015	United SportsCar Championship - GTD	Magnus Racing	10	0	0	0	2	258	8th
2016	IMSA SportsCar Championship - GTD	Magnus Racing	11	2	0	0	4	258	7th
2017	Pirelli World Challenge - GTA	Magnus Racing	9	0	0	1	3	171	**2nd**
2018	IMSA SportsCar Championship - GTD	Magnus Racing	11	0	0	0	2	255	8th
2019	IMSA SportsCar Championship - GTD	Magnus Racing	11	0	0	0	2	249	4th
2020	IMSA SportsCar Championship - GTD	GRT Magnus	11	0	0	0	2	244	9th
2021	IMSA SportsCar Championship - GTD	Magnus Racing with Archangel Motorsports	10	0	0	0	0	2228	11th
2022	IMSA SportsCar Championship - GTD	Magnus Racing	5	0	0	0	1	1284	17th
2023	IMSA SportsCar Championship - GTD	Magnus Racing	5	0	0	0	1	1264	20th
2024	IMSA SportsCar Championship - GTD	Magnus Racing	5	0	0	0	1	995	37th
2025	IMSA SportsCar Championship - GTD	Magnus Racing	3	0	0	0	0	411	50th
2026	IMSA SportsCar Championship - GTD Pro	Magnus Racing	3	0	0	0	1	729	46th

=== 24 Hours of Daytona results ===
Year	Team	Co-drivers	Car	Class	Laps	Pos.	Class Pos.
2009	(United States) Riegel/Stanton/The Racer's Group	(United States) Craig Stanton (United States) Bryce Miller (Germany) Marco Holzer	Porsche 911 GT3 Cup	GT	379	33rd DNF	21st DNF
2010	(United States) Magnus Racing	(Netherlands) Jeroen Bleekemolen (Austria) Richard Lietz (United States) Craig Stanton	Porsche 911 GT3 Cup	GT	683	12th	5th
2011	(United States) Magnus Racing	(United States) Craig Stanton (Austria) Richard Lietz (Germany) Marco Holzer	Porsche 911 GT3 Cup	GT	675	16th	4th
2012	(United States) Magnus Racing	(United States) Andy Lally (Austria) Richard Lietz (Germany) René Rast	Porsche 911 GT3 Cup	GT	727	12th	**1st**
2013	(United States) Magnus Racing	(France) Nicolas Armindo (United States) Andy Lally (Austria) Richard Lietz	Porsche 911 GT3 Cup	GT	678	13th	5th
2014	(United States) Magnus Racing	(United States) Andy Lally (Germany) Wolf Henzler (Canada) Jean-François Dumoulin	Porsche 911 GT America	GTD	647	31st	12th
2015	(United States) Magnus Racing	(United States) Andy Lally (Germany) Marco Seefried (Austria) Martin Ragginger	Porsche 911 GT America	GTD	616	27th	11th
2016	(United States) Magnus Racing	(United States) Andy Lally (Germany) Marco Seefried (Germany) René Rast	Audi R8 LMS	GTD	703	14th	**1st**
2018	(United States) Magnus Racing	(United States) Andrew Davis (United States) Andy Lally (Germany) Markus Winkelhock	Audi R8 LMS GT3	GTD	750	26th	6th
2019	(United States) Magnus Racing	(United States) Andy Lally (Italy) Marco Mapelli (United States) Spencer Pumpelly	Lamborghini Huracán GT3 Evo	GTD	559	26th	10th
2020	(United States) GRT Magnus	(United States) Andy Lally (Italy) Marco Mapelli (United States) Spencer Pumpelly	Lamborghini Huracán GT3 Evo	GTD	765	19th	**2nd**
2021	(United States) Magnus Racing with Archangel Motorsports	(Germany) Mario Farnbacher (United States) Andy Lally (United States) Spencer Pumpelly	Acura NSX GT3 Evo	GTD	736	33rd	11th
2022	(United States) Magnus Racing	(United Kingdom) Jonathan Adam (United States) Andy Lally (United States) Spencer Pumpelly	Aston Martin Vantage AMR GT3	GTD	707	24th	**2nd**
2023	(United States) Magnus Racing	(United States) Andy Lally (United States) Spencer Pumpelly (Denmark) Nicki Thiim	Aston Martin Vantage AMR GT3	GTD	729	18th	**2nd**

=== Rolex Sports Car Series results ===
(key) (Races in bold indicate pole position) (Races in italics indicate fastest lap)

Year	Team	Make	Engine	Class	1	2	3	4	5	6	7	8	9	10	11	12	13	Rank	Points	Ref
2007	The Racer's Group	Porsche 911 GT3 Cup	Porsche 3.6 L Flat-6	GT	DAY	MEX	HOM	VIR	LGA	LIM	WGL; 18	MOH	DAY	IOW	BAR	MON	MIL; 12			
2008	The Racer's Group	Porsche 911 GT3 Cup	Porsche 3.6 L Flat-6	GT	DAY	HOM	MEX	VIR	LGA	LIM; 13		MOH	DAY	BAR	MON	NJ; 14	MIL; 17			
2008	Farnbacher Loles Racing	Porsche 911 GT3 Cup	Porsche 3.6 L Flat-6	GT							WGL; 10									
2009	Riegel/Stanton/The Racer's Group	Porsche 911 GT3 Cup	Porsche 3.6 L Flat-6	GT	DAY; 21	VIR; 9	NJ; 8	LAG; 7		MOH; 9	DAY; 10	BAR; 8	WGL; 7	MON; 9	MIL; 5	HOM; 4		10th	271	
2009	The Racer's Group	Porsche 911 GT3 Cup	Porsche 3.6 L Flat-6	GT					WAT; 5									10th	271	
2010	Magnus Racing	Porsche 911 GT3 Cup	Porsche 3.6 L Flat-6	GT	DAY; 5	HOM; 14	BIR; 11	VIR; 4	LIM; 7	WAT; 11	LEX; 14†	DAY; 16	NJ; 6	WGL; 15	MON; 5	SLK; 8		12th	240	
2011	Magnus Racing	Porsche 911 GT3 Cup	Porsche 3.6 L Flat-6	GT	DAY; 4	HOM; 3	BIR; 5	VIR; 15	LIM; 9	WAT; 5	ELK; 4	LAG; 7	NJ; 8	WGL; 3	MON; 7	MOH; 7		6th	301	
2012	Magnus Racing	Porsche 911 GT3 Cup	Porsche 3.8 L Flat-6	GT	DAY; 1	BAR; 4	HOM; 7	NJ; 3	DET; 6	MOH; 5	ELK; DNF	WAT; DNF	IMS; 1	WAT; 4	MON; 11	LAG; 3	LRP; 6	7th	323	
2013	Magnus Racing	Porsche 911 GT3 Cup	Porsche 4.0 L Flat-6	GT	DAY; 5	COA; 2	BAR; 6	ATL; 5	DET; 4	MOH; 2	WAT; 3	IMS; 3	ELK; 5	KAN; 8	LAG; 1	LRP; 13		2nd	331	

† Potter did not complete sufficient laps in order to score full points.

=== American Le Mans Series results ===
(key) (Races in bold indicate pole position) (Races in italics indicate fastest lap)

Year	Team	Make	Engine	Class	1	2	3	4	5	6	7	8	9	Rank	Points	Ref
2010	Magnus Racing	Porsche 911 GT3 Cup	Porsche 3.8 L Flat-6	GTC	SEB	LBH	LAG	UTA	LRP	MOH	ELK	MOS	PET; 3	NC	0	
2011	Magnus Racing	Porsche 911 GT3 Cup	Porsche 3.8 L Flat-6	GTC	SEB; 7	LBH; 3	LRP	MOS	MOH; 3	ELK	BAL; 3	LAG	PET	12th	53	

=== IMSA WeatherTech SportsCar Championship results ===
(key) (Races in bold indicate pole position) (Races in italics indicate fastest lap)

Year	Team	Class	Make	Engine	1	2	3	4	5	6	7	8	9	10	11	12	Rank	Points	Ref
2014	Magnus Racing	GTD	Porsche 911 GT America	Porsche 4.0 L Flat-6	DAY; 12	SEB; 1	LAG; 3	DET; 13	WGL; 3	MOS; 9	IMS; 12	ELK; 14	VIR; 6	COA; 2	PET; 3		8th	272	
2015	Magnus Racing	GTD	Porsche 911 GT America	Porsche 4.0 L Flat-6	DAY; 11	SEB; 11	LAG; 6	DET; 7	WGL; 2	LIM; 5	ELK; 5	VIR; 9	COA; 12	PET; 2			8th	258	
2016	Magnus Racing	GTD	Audi R8 LMS	Audi 5.2 L V10	DAY; 1	SEB; 3	LAG; 13	DET; 10	WGL; 2	MOS; 10	LIM; 1	ELK; 4	VIR; 3^{1}	COA; 4	PET; 12		7th	258	
2018	Magnus Racing	GTD	Audi R8 LMS GT3	Audi 5.2 L V10	DAY; 6	SEB; 13	MOH; 10	DET; 10	WGL; 17	MOS; 3	LIM; 2	ELK; 9	VIR; 7	LAG; 5	PET; 9		8th	255	
2019	Magnus Racing	GTD	Lamborghini Huracán GT3 Evo	Lamborghini 5.2 L V10	DAY; 10	SEB; 2	MOH; 8	BEL; 4	WGL; 7	MOS; 8	LIM; 8	ELK; 6	VIR; 6	LGA; 3	ATL; 8		4th	249	
2020	GRT Magnus	GTD	Lamborghini Huracán GT3 Evo	Lamborghini 5.2 L V10	DAY; 2	DAY; 9	SEB; 10†	ELK; 8	VIR; 7	ATL; 12	MOH; 7	CLT; 11	PET; 3	LGA; 5	SEB; 7		9th	244	
2021	Magnus Racing with Archangel Motorsports	GTD	Acura NSX GT3 Evo	Acura 3.5 L Turbo V6	DAY; 11	SEB; 4	MOH; 9	DET	WGL; 12	WGL	LIM; 13	ELK; 13	LGA; 9	LBH; 14	VIR; 14	PET; 6	11th	2228	
2022	Magnus Racing	GTD	Aston Martin Vantage AMR GT3	Aston Martin 4.0 L Turbo V8	DAY; 2	SEB; 6	LBH	LGA	MOH	DET	WGL; 5	MOS	LIM	ELK	VIR; 12	PET; 14	17th	1284	
2023	Magnus Racing	GTD	Aston Martin Vantage AMR GT3	Aston Martin 4.0 L Turbo V8	DAY; 2	SEB; 9	LBH	MON; 4	WGL; 9	MOS	LIM	ELK	VIR	IMS	PET; 17		20th	1264	
2024	Magnus Racing	GTD	Aston Martin Vantage AMR GT3 Evo	Aston Martin 4.0 L Turbo V8	DAY; 23	SEB; 10	LBH	LGA	WGL; 3	MOS	ELK	VIR	IMS; 11	PET; 18			37th	995	
2025	Magnus Racing	GTD	Aston Martin Vantage AMR GT3 Evo	Aston Martin 4.0 L Turbo V8	DAY; 21	SEB	LBH	LGA	WGL; 17	MOS	ELK	VIR	IMS	PET; 19			50th	411	
2026	Magnus Racing	GTD	Aston Martin Vantage AMR GT3 Evo	Aston Martin AMR16A 4.0 L Turbo V8	DAY; 2	SEB	LBH	LGA	WGL; 19	MOS	ELK	VIR	IMS	PET; 5			46th	729	

^{†} Points only counted towards the WeatherTech Sprint Cup and not the overall GTD Championship. * Season still in progress

Notes

^{1} Disqualified for minimum ride height violation.
