= 2015 Lone Star Le Mans =

Sports Car race

Map of the Circuit of the Americas - Grand Prix Circuit

The 2015 Lone Star Le Mans was a sports car race sanctioned by the International Motor Sports Association (IMSA). The race was held at Circuit of the Americas in Austin, Texas, on September 19, 2015. The race was the eleventh round of the 2015 United SportsCar Championship.

== Background ==
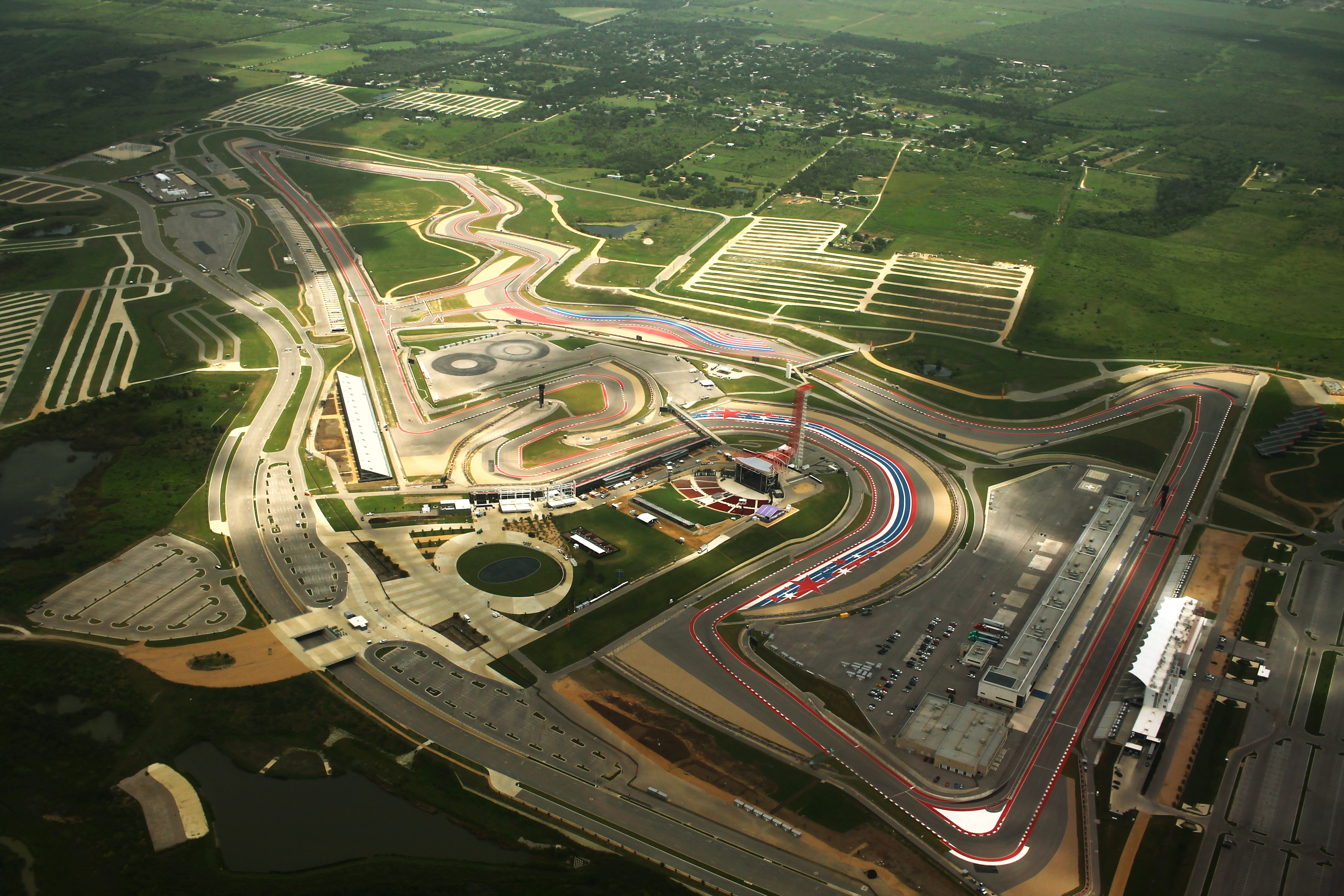
Circuit of the Americas (pictured in 2015), where the race was held.

=== Preview ===
International Motor Sports Association (IMSA) president Scott Atherton confirmed the race was part of the schedule for the 2015 IMSA Tudor United SportsCar Championship (IMSA TUSC) in August 2014. It was the second consecutive year the event was held as part of the United SportsCar Championship. The 2015 Lone Star Le Mans was the eleventh of twelve scheduled sports car races of 2015 by IMSA, and was the eighth round not held as part of the North American Endurance Cup. The race was held at the twenty-turn 3.426 mi (5.514 km) Circuit of the Americas in Austin, Texas on September 19, 2015.

=== Entry list ===
Thirty-eight cars were officially entered for the Lone Star Le Mans. Action Express Racing (AER) fielded two Chevrolet Corvette DP cars while VisitFlorida Racing (VFR) and Wayne Taylor Racing (WTR) fielded one. Chip Ganassi Racing (CGR) entered one Ford-powered Riley MkXXVI. Mazda Motorsports had two Lola B12/80 cars and Michael Shank Racing (MSR) entered one Ligier JS P2 chassis with Honda HR28TT twin-turbocharged 2.8-liter V6 engine. They were joined by DeltaWing. The Prototype Challenge (PC) class was composed of Nine Oreca FLM09 cars: two from BAR1 Motorsports and two from Starworks Motorsport. CORE Autosport, JDC-Miller MotorSports, Performance Tech, PR1/Mathiasen Motorsports, and RSR Racing entered one car each. GTLM was represented by eight entries from four different brands. In the list of GTD entrants, twelve GT-specification vehicles were represented by six different manufacturers. The No. 45 Flying Lizard Motorsports Audi R8 LMS ultra was reinstated to the Tudor United SportsCar Championship after making its first appearance since the Laguna Seca round. Lone Star Racing made their series debut.

== Qualifying ==
Friday afternoon's 90-minute four-group qualifying session gave 15-minute sessions to all categories. Cars in GTD were sent out first before those grouped in GTLM, PC, and Prototype had three separate identically timed sessions. Regulations stipulated teams to nominate one qualifying driver, with the fastest laps determining each classes starting order. IMSA would arranged the grid to put all Prototypes ahead of the PC, GTLM, and GTD cars.

=== Qualifying results ===
Pole positions in each class are indicated in bold and by ‡. P stands for Prototype, PC (Prototype Challenge), GTLM (Grand Touring Le Mans) and GTD (Grand Touring Daytona).

Pos.	Class	No.	Team	Driver	Time	Gap	Grid
1	**P**	**01**	**(United States) Chip Ganassi Racing**	**(United States) Scott Pruett**	**1:58.441**	**_**	1‡
2	P	60	(United States) Michael Shank Racing with Curb/Agajanian	(Brazil) Oswaldo Negri Jr.	1:58.512	+0.071	2
3	P	5	(United States) Action Express Racing	(Brazil) Christian Fittipaldi	1:59.008	+0.567	3
4	P	10	(United States) Wayne Taylor Racing	(United States) Jordan Taylor	1:59.033	+0.592	4
5	P	31	(United States) Action Express Racing	(United States) Eric Curran	2:00.011	+1.570	5
6	P	90	(United States) VisitFlorida.com Racing	(Canada) Michael Valiante	2:00.111	+1.670	6
7	P	0	(United States) DeltaWing Racing Cars with Claro/TracFone	(Mexico) Memo Rojas	2:01.570	+3.129	7
8	**PC**	**11**	**(United States) RSR Racing**	**(Canada) Chris Cumming**	**2:02.222**	**+3.781**	8‡
9	PC	85	(United States) JDC-Miller MotorSports	(United States) Matt McMurry	2:02.697	+4.256	9
10	P	70	(United States) SpeedSource	(United States) Tristan Nunez	2:02.779	+4.338	10
11	P	07	(United States) SpeedSource	(United States) Tom Long	2:03.484	+5.043	11
12	PC	38	(United States) Performance Tech Motorsports	(United States) James French	2:03.586	+5.145	12
13	PC	54	(United States) CORE Autosport	(United States) Jon Bennett	2:03.697	+5.256	13
14	PC	8	(United States) Starworks Motorsport	(United States) Mike Hedlund	2:04.009	+5.568	14
15	**GTLM**	**911**	**(United States) Porsche North America**	**(France) Patrick Pilet**	**2:04.396**	**+5.955**	17‡
16	PC	52	(United States) PR1/Mathiasen Motorsports	(United States) Mike Guasch	2:04.432	+5.991	15
17	GTLM	25	(United States) BMW Team RLL	(Germany) Dirk Werner	2:04.490	+6.049	18
18	GTLM	912	(United States) Porsche North America	(New Zealand) Earl Bamber	2:04.625	+6.184	19
19	GTLM	3	(United States) Corvette Racing	(Spain) Antonio García	2:04.651	+6.210	20
20	GTLM	17	(United States) Team Falken Tire	(Germany) Wolf Henzler	2:04.813	+6.372	21
21	GTLM	24	(United States) BMW Team RLL	(United States) John Edwards	2:04.968	+6.527	22
22	GTLM	4	(United States) Corvette Racing	(United States) Tommy Milner	2:05.245	+6.804	23
23	GTLM	62	(United States) Risi Competizione	(Italy) Giancarlo Fisichella	2:05.996	+7.555	24
24	PC	61	(United States) BAR1 Motorsports	(United States) Don Yount	2:08.350	+9.909	16
25	**GTD**	**48**	**(United States) Paul Miller Racing**	**(South Africa) Dion von Moltke**	**2:11.097**	**+12.656**	25‡
26	GTD	33	(United States) Riley Motorsports	(United States) Ben Keating	2:11.658	+13.217	26
27	GTD	63	(United States) Scuderia Corsa	(United States) Bill Sweedler	2:11.729	+13.288	27
28	GTD	007	(United States) TRG-AMR North America	(Denmark) Christina Nielsen	2:11.761	+13.320	28
29	GTD	73	(United States) Park Place Motorsports	(United States) Patrick Lindsey	2:12.213	+13.772	29
30	GTD	44	(United States) Magnus Racing	(United States) John Potter	2:12.478	+14.037	30
31	GTD	80	(United States) Lone Star Racing	(United States) Dan Knox	2:12.835	+14.394	31
32	GTD	23	(United States) Team Seattle / Alex Job Racing	(United Kingdom) Ian James	2:12.935	+14.494	32
33	GTD	97	(United States) Turner Motorsport	(United States) Michael Marsal	2:13.054	+14.613	33
34	GTD	22	(United States) Alex Job Racing	(United States) Cooper MacNeil	2:13.126	+14.685	34
35	GTD	45	(United States) Flying Lizard Motorsports	(United States) Mike Vess	2:16.353	+17.912	35
36	GTD	76	(Canada) Compass360 Racing	(United States) Ray Mason	2:16.518	+18.077	36
37	PC	16	(United States) BAR1 Motorsports	No Time Established			37
38	PC	88	(United States) Starworks Motorsport	No Time Established			38

== Race ==
=== Race results ===
Class winners are denoted in bold and ‡. P stands for Prototype, PC (Prototype Challenge), GTLM (Grand Touring Le Mans) and GTD (Grand Touring Daytona).

Final race classification
Pos	Class	No.	Team	Drivers	Chassis	Tire	Laps	Time/Retired
Pos	Class	No.	Team	Drivers	Engine	Tire	Laps	Time/Retired
1	**P**	**01**	**(United States) Chip Ganassi Racing**	**(United States) Joey Hand (United States) Scott Pruett**	**Ford EcoBoost Riley DP**	C	**73**	**2:41:07.039‡**
1	**P**	**01**	**(United States) Chip Ganassi Racing**	**(United States) Joey Hand (United States) Scott Pruett**	**Ford EcoBoost 3.5 L V6 Turbo**	C	**73**	**2:41:07.039‡**
2	P	10	(United States) Wayne Taylor Racing	(United States) Jordan Taylor (United States) Ricky Taylor	Corvette Daytona Prototype	C	73	+16.910
2	P	10	(United States) Wayne Taylor Racing	(United States) Jordan Taylor (United States) Ricky Taylor	Chevrolet 5.5 L V8	C	73	+16.910
3	P	90	(United States) VisitFlorida.com Racing	(United Kingdom) Richard Westbrook (Canada) Michael Valiante	Corvette Daytona Prototype	C	73	+44.212
3	P	90	(United States) VisitFlorida.com Racing	(United Kingdom) Richard Westbrook (Canada) Michael Valiante	Chevrolet 5.5 L V8	C	73	+44.212
4	P	60	(United States) Michael Shank Racing with Curb/Agajanian	(United States) John Pew (Brazil) Oswaldo Negri Jr.	Ligier JS P2	C	73	+44.575
4	P	60	(United States) Michael Shank Racing with Curb/Agajanian	(United States) John Pew (Brazil) Oswaldo Negri Jr.	Honda HR28TT 2.8 L V6 Turbo	C	73	+44.575
5	P	31	(United States) Action Express Racing	(United States) Eric Curran (United States) Dane Cameron	Corvette Daytona Prototype	C	73	+1:06.753
5	P	31	(United States) Action Express Racing	(United States) Eric Curran (United States) Dane Cameron	Chevrolet 5.5 L V8	C	73	+1:06.753
6	**PC**	**54**	**(United States) CORE Autosport**	**(United States) Jon Bennett (United States) Colin Braun**	**Oreca FLM09**	C	**73**	**+1:28.158‡**
6	**PC**	**54**	**(United States) CORE Autosport**	**(United States) Jon Bennett (United States) Colin Braun**	**Chevrolet 6.2 L V8**	C	**73**	**+1:28.158‡**
7	PC	11	(United States) RSR Racing	(Canada) Chris Cumming (Brazil) Bruno Junqueira	Oreca FLM09	C	73	+1:53.822
7	PC	11	(United States) RSR Racing	(Canada) Chris Cumming (Brazil) Bruno Junqueira	Chevrolet 6.2 L V8	C	73	+1:53.822
8	PC	38	(United States) Performance Tech Motorsports	(United States) Conor Daly (United States) James French	Oreca FLM09	C	73	+1:57.517
8	PC	38	(United States) Performance Tech Motorsports	(United States) Conor Daly (United States) James French	Chevrolet 6.2 L V8	C	73	+1:57.517
9	PC	52	(United States) PR1/Mathiasen Motorsports	(United States) Mike Guasch (United Kingdom) Tom Kimber-Smith	Oreca FLM09	C	73	+1:58.239
9	PC	52	(United States) PR1/Mathiasen Motorsports	(United States) Mike Guasch (United Kingdom) Tom Kimber-Smith	Chevrolet 6.2 L V8	C	73	+1:58.239
10	P	5	(United States) Action Express Racing	(Portugal) João Barbosa (Brazil) Christian Fittipaldi	Corvette Daytona Prototype	C	72	+1 lap
10	P	5	(United States) Action Express Racing	(Portugal) João Barbosa (Brazil) Christian Fittipaldi	Chevrolet 5.5 L V8	C	72	+1 lap
11	P	0	(United States) DeltaWing Racing Cars with Claro/TracFone	(Mexico) Memo Rojas (United Kingdom) Katherine Legge	DeltaWing DWC13	C	72	+1 lap
11	P	0	(United States) DeltaWing Racing Cars with Claro/TracFone	(Mexico) Memo Rojas (United Kingdom) Katherine Legge	Élan (Mazda) 1.9 L I4 Turbo	C	72	+1 lap
12	**GTLM**	**25**	**(United States) BMW Team RLL**	**(United States) Bill Auberlen (Germany) Dirk Werner**	**BMW Z4 GTE**	M	**72**	**+1 lap‡**
12	**GTLM**	**25**	**(United States) BMW Team RLL**	**(United States) Bill Auberlen (Germany) Dirk Werner**	**BMW 4.4 L V8**	M	**72**	**+1 lap‡**
13	GTLM	62	(United States) Risi Competizione	(Germany) Pierre Kaffer (Italy) Giancarlo Fisichella	Ferrari 458 Italia GT2	M	72	+1 lap
13	GTLM	62	(United States) Risi Competizione	(Germany) Pierre Kaffer (Italy) Giancarlo Fisichella	Ferrari 4.5 L V8	M	72	+1 lap
14	PC	85	(United States) JDC-Miller MotorSports	(Canada) Misha Goikhberg (United States) Matt McMurry	Oreca FLM09	C	72	+1 lap
14	PC	85	(United States) JDC-Miller MotorSports	(Canada) Misha Goikhberg (United States) Matt McMurry	Chevrolet 6.2 L V8	C	72	+1 lap
15	GTLM	911	(United States) Porsche North America	(France) Patrick Pilet (United Kingdom) Nick Tandy	Porsche 911 RSR	M	72	+1 lap
15	GTLM	911	(United States) Porsche North America	(France) Patrick Pilet (United Kingdom) Nick Tandy	Porsche 4.0 L Flat-6	M	72	+1 lap
16	GTLM	17	(United States) Team Falken Tire	(United States) Bryan Sellers (Germany) Wolf Henzler	Porsche 911 RSR	F	72	+1 lap
16	GTLM	17	(United States) Team Falken Tire	(United States) Bryan Sellers (Germany) Wolf Henzler	Porsche 4.0 L Flat-6	F	72	+1 lap
17	GTLM	912	(United States) Porsche North America	(New Zealand) Earl Bamber (Germany) Jörg Bergmeister	Porsche 911 RSR	M	72	+1 lap
17	GTLM	912	(United States) Porsche North America	(New Zealand) Earl Bamber (Germany) Jörg Bergmeister	Porsche 4.0 L Flat-6	M	72	+1 lap
18	GTLM	3	(United States) Corvette Racing	(Spain) Antonio García (Denmark) Jan Magnussen	Chevrolet Corvette C7.R	M	72	+1 lap
18	GTLM	3	(United States) Corvette Racing	(Spain) Antonio García (Denmark) Jan Magnussen	Chevrolet LT5.5 5.5 L V8	M	72	+1 lap
19	GTLM	24	(United States) BMW Team RLL	(United States) John Edwards (Germany) Lucas Luhr	BMW Z4 GTE	M	72	+1 lap
19	GTLM	24	(United States) BMW Team RLL	(United States) John Edwards (Germany) Lucas Luhr	BMW 4.4 L V8	M	72	+1 lap
20	GTLM	4	(United States) Corvette Racing	(United Kingdom) Oliver Gavin (United States) Tommy Milner	Chevrolet Corvette C7.R	M	72	+1 lap
20	GTLM	4	(United States) Corvette Racing	(United Kingdom) Oliver Gavin (United States) Tommy Milner	Chevrolet LT5.5 5.5 L V8	M	72	+1 lap
21 DNF	PC	8	(United States) Starworks Motorsport	(United States) Mike Hedlund (Netherlands) Renger van der Zande	Oreca FLM09	C	70	Suspension
21 DNF	PC	8	(United States) Starworks Motorsport	(United States) Mike Hedlund (Netherlands) Renger van der Zande	Chevrolet 6.2 L V8	C	70	Suspension
22	**GTD**	**33**	**(United States) Riley Motorsports**	**(Netherlands) Jeroen Bleekemolen (United States) Ben Keating**	**Dodge Viper GT3-R**	C	**69**	**+4 Laps‡**
22	**GTD**	**33**	**(United States) Riley Motorsports**	**(Netherlands) Jeroen Bleekemolen (United States) Ben Keating**	**Dodge 8.3 L V10**	C	**69**	**+4 Laps‡**
23	GTD	97	(United States) Turner Motorsport	(United States) Michael Marsal (Finland) Markus Palttala	BMW Z4 GT3	C	69	+4 Laps
23	GTD	97	(United States) Turner Motorsport	(United States) Michael Marsal (Finland) Markus Palttala	BMW 4.4 L V8	C	69	+4 Laps
24	GTD	48	(United States) Paul Miller Racing	(Germany) Christopher Haase (South Africa) Dion von Moltke	Audi R8 LMS ultra	C	69	+4 Laps
24	GTD	48	(United States) Paul Miller Racing	(Germany) Christopher Haase (South Africa) Dion von Moltke	Audi 5.2 L V10	C	69	+4 Laps
25	GTD	23	(United States) Team Seattle / Alex Job Racing	(Germany) Mario Farnbacher (United Kingdom) Ian James	Porsche 911 GT America	C	69	+4 Laps
25	GTD	23	(United States) Team Seattle / Alex Job Racing	(Germany) Mario Farnbacher (United Kingdom) Ian James	Porsche 4.0 L Flat-6	C	69	+4 Laps
26	GTD	73	(United States) Park Place Motorsports	(United States) Patrick Lindsey (United States) Spencer Pumpelly	Porsche 911 GT America	C	69	+4 Laps
26	GTD	73	(United States) Park Place Motorsports	(United States) Patrick Lindsey (United States) Spencer Pumpelly	Porsche 4.0 L Flat-6	C	69	+4 Laps
27	GTD	63	(United States) Scuderia Corsa	(United States) Bill Sweedler (United States) Townsend Bell	Ferrari 458 Italia GT3	C	69	+4 Laps
27	GTD	63	(United States) Scuderia Corsa	(United States) Bill Sweedler (United States) Townsend Bell	Ferrari 4.5 L V8	C	69	+4 Laps
28	GTD	80	(United States) Lone Star Racing	(Belgium) Marc Goossens (United States) Dan Knox	Dodge Viper GT3-R	C	69	+4 Laps
28	GTD	80	(United States) Lone Star Racing	(Belgium) Marc Goossens (United States) Dan Knox	Dodge 8.3 L V10	C	69	+4 Laps
29	GTD	007	(United States) TRG-AMR North America	(Denmark) Christina Nielsen (Canada) Kuno Wittmer	Aston Martin V12 Vantage GT3	C	69	+4 Laps
29	GTD	007	(United States) TRG-AMR North America	(Denmark) Christina Nielsen (Canada) Kuno Wittmer	Aston Martin 6.0 L V12	C	69	+4 Laps
30	GTD	22	(United States) Alex Job Racing	(United States) Leh Keen (United States) Cooper MacNeil	Porsche 911 GT America	C	68	+5 Laps
30	GTD	22	(United States) Alex Job Racing	(United States) Leh Keen (United States) Cooper MacNeil	Porsche 4.0 L Flat-6	C	68	+5 Laps
31	GTD	76	(Canada) Compass360 Racing	(Brazil) Pierre Kleinubing (United States) Ray Mason	Audi R8 LMS ultra	C	68	+5 Laps
31	GTD	76	(Canada) Compass360 Racing	(Brazil) Pierre Kleinubing (United States) Ray Mason	Audi 5.2 L V10	C	68	+5 Laps
32	GTD	45	(United States) Flying Lizard Motorsports	(United States) Jason Hart (United States) Mike Vess	Audi R8 LMS ultra	C	66	+7 Laps
32	GTD	45	(United States) Flying Lizard Motorsports	(United States) Jason Hart (United States) Mike Vess	Audi 5.2 L V10	C	66	+7 Laps
33 DNF	P	70	(United States) SpeedSource	(United States) Jonathan Bomarito (United States) Tristan Nunez	Mazda Prototype	C	65	Belt
33 DNF	P	70	(United States) SpeedSource	(United States) Jonathan Bomarito (United States) Tristan Nunez	Mazda Skyactiv-D 2.2 L Turbo I4 (Diesel)	C	65	Belt
34	GTD	44	(United States) Magnus Racing	(United States) John Potter (United States) Andy Lally	Porsche 911 GT America	C	46	+27 Laps
34	GTD	44	(United States) Magnus Racing	(United States) John Potter (United States) Andy Lally	Porsche 4.0 L Flat-6	C	46	+27 Laps
35 DNF	PC	61	(United States) BAR1 Motorsports	(United Kingdom) Ryan Lewis (United States) Don Yount	Oreca FLM09	C	33	Accident
35 DNF	PC	61	(United States) BAR1 Motorsports	(United Kingdom) Ryan Lewis (United States) Don Yount	Chevrolet 6.2 L V8	C	33	Accident
36 DNF	P	07	(United States) SpeedSource	(United States) Tom Long (United States) Joel Miller	Mazda Prototype	C	23	Belt
36 DNF	P	07	(United States) SpeedSource	(United States) Tom Long (United States) Joel Miller	Mazda Skyactiv-D 2.2 L Turbo I4 (Diesel)	C	23	Belt
37 DNS	PC	16	(United States) BAR1 Motorsports	(United States) John Falb (United States) Todd Slusher	Oreca FLM09	C	--	Did Not Start
37 DNS	PC	16	(United States) BAR1 Motorsports	(United States) John Falb (United States) Todd Slusher	Chevrolet 6.2 L V8	C	--	Did Not Start
38 DNS	PC	88	(United States) Starworks Motorsport	(Venezuela) Alex Popow (United States) Sean Rayhall	Oreca FLM09	C	--	Did Not Start
38 DNS	PC	88	(United States) Starworks Motorsport	(Venezuela) Alex Popow (United States) Sean Rayhall	Chevrolet 6.2 L V8	C	--	Did Not Start

Tyre manufacturers
Key
Symbol	Tyre manufacturer
**C**	Continental
**M**	Michelin
**F**	Falken Tire

United SportsCar Championship
Previous race: Oak Tree Grand Prix	2015 season	Next race: Petit Le Mans
