= Magnus Racing =

American auto racing team

(United States) Magnus Racing
- Founded: 2010
- Founder(s): John Potter
- Base: Tooele, Utah, United States
- Team principal(s): John Potter
- Current series: IMSA SportsCar Championship
- Current drivers: IMSA SportsCar Championship: 44. (United States) Andy Lally (United States) John Potter (United States) Spencer Pumpelly (Denmark) Nicki Thiim

Magnus Racing is an automobile racing team based in Tooele, Utah, USA. The team is competing in the 2025 IMSA WeatherTech SportsCar Championship. The team was established in 2010 by John Potter and runs an Aston Martin Vantage GT3 car in the series.

== History ==
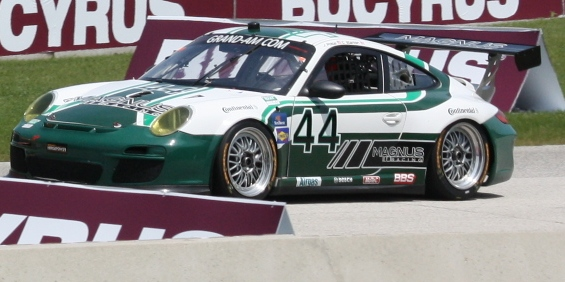
Magnus Racing #44 in 2011 with Potter / Stanton

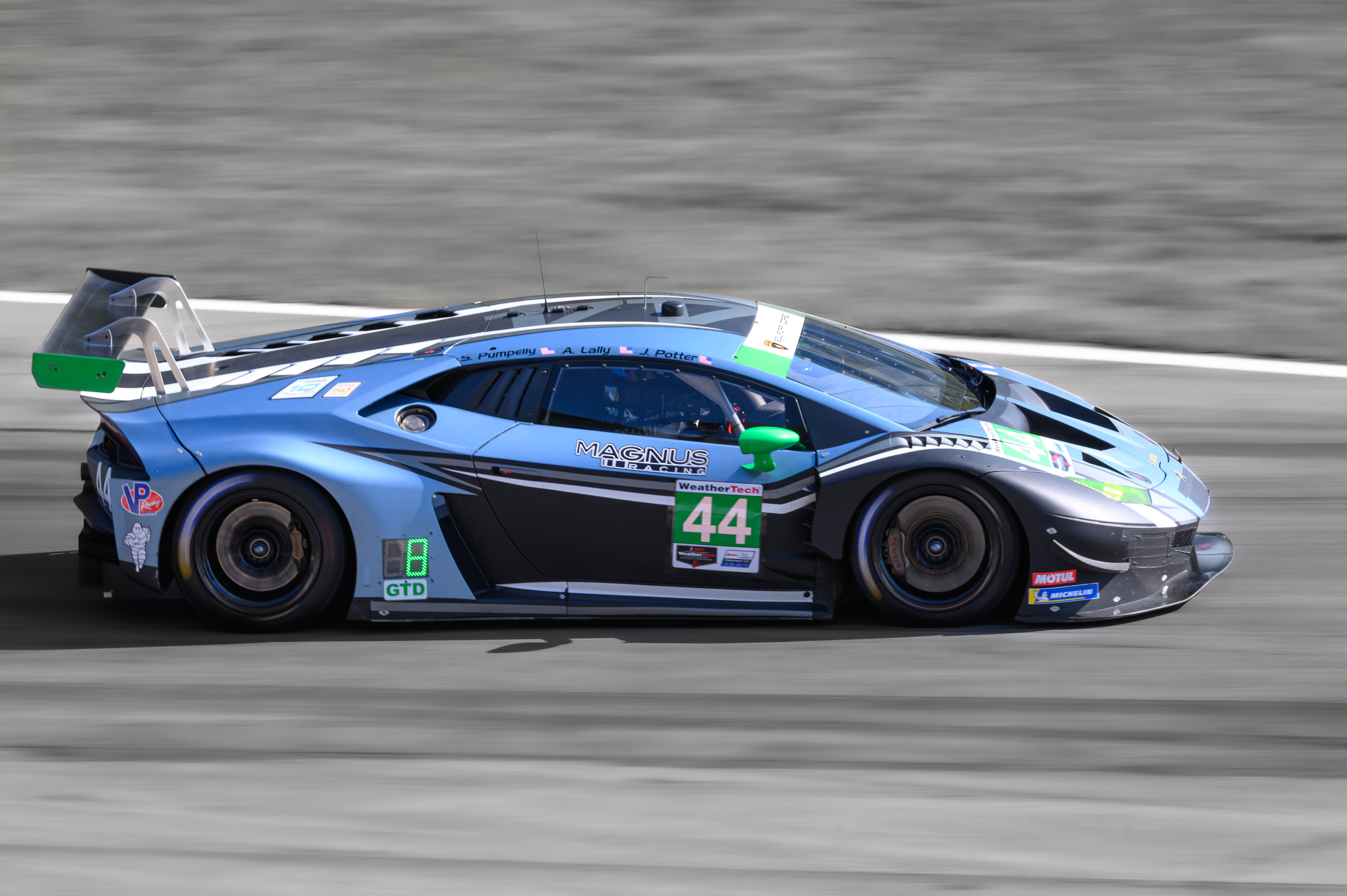
Magnus Racing #44 in 2019 with Potter / Lally / Pumpelly

The team finished fifth in GT in its debut in the 2010 24 Hours of Daytona and was a regular competitor in the Rolex Sports Car Series season before making its American Le Mans Series debut at the season-ending Petit Le Mans, finishing third in the GTC class.

In 2011, Magnus Racing competed in a full-season in the Rolex Sports Car Series and select races of the American Le Mans Series.

Magnus began the 2012 Rolex Sports Car Series season with a GT class victory at the 2012 24 Hours of Daytona with drivers Andy Lally, Richard Lietz, René Rast and the team owner John Potter. It was the team's first victory.

== Former drivers ==
- Craig Stanton – 2010–2011
- Marco Mapelli - 2023
