= 2018 IMSA SportsCar Championship =

48th season of the racing series organized by IMSA

The 2018 IMSA SportsCar Championship (known for sponsorship reasons as the 2018 IMSA WeatherTech SportsCar Championship) was the 48th motor racing championship sanctioned by the International Motor Sports Association (IMSA) (which traces its lineage to the 1971 IMSA GT Championship). It was the fifth season of the United SportsCar Championship and third to be held under the name as the IMSA SportsCar Championship. It began on January 27 with the 24 Hours of Daytona, and ended on October 13 with the Petit Le Mans.

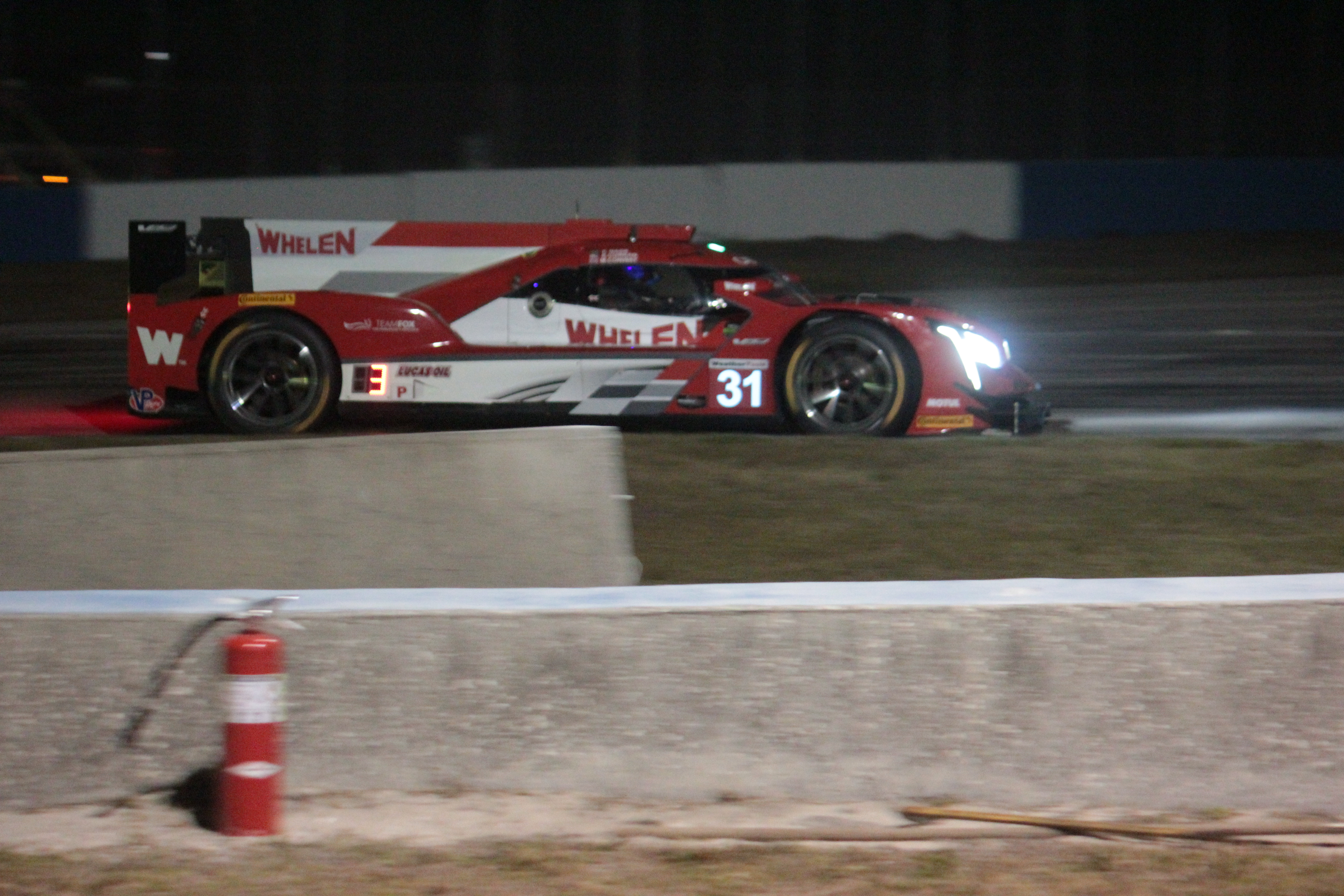
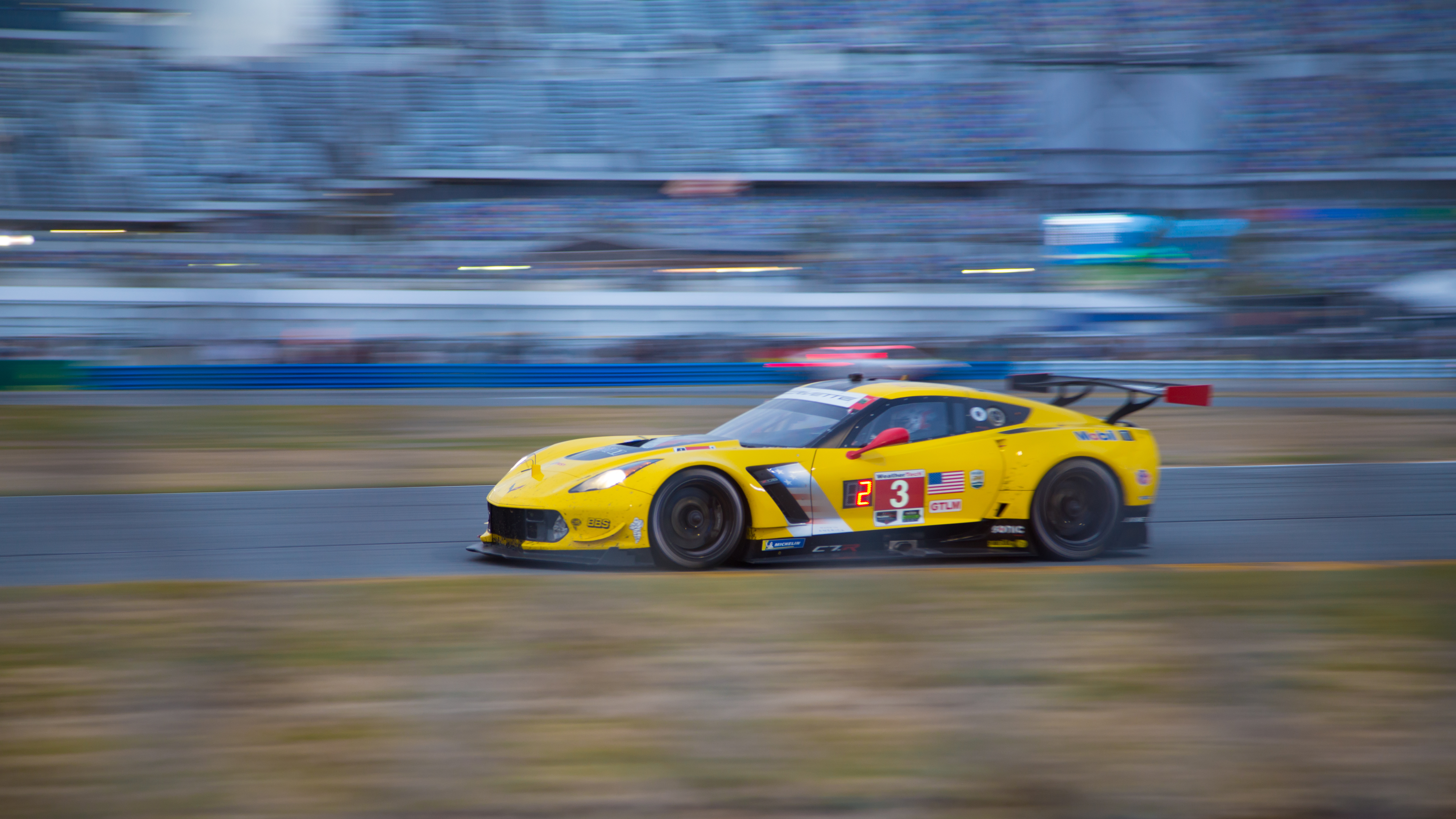
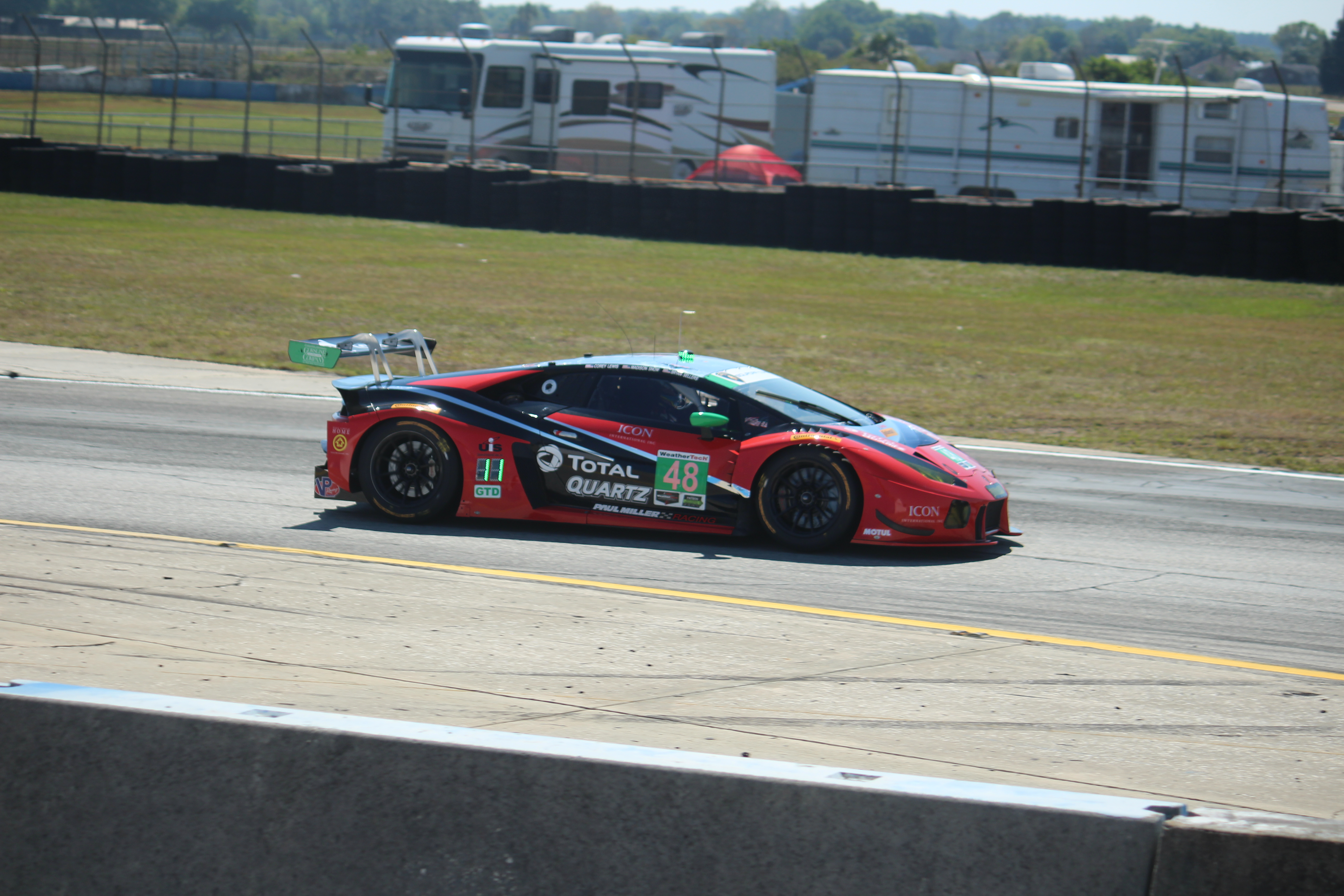
The No. 31 Whelen Engineering Racing car won the Prototype Teams and Drivers' Championship, with Cadillac winning the Prototype Manufacturers' Championship. The No. 3 Corvette Racing won the GT Le Mans Teams' and Drivers' Championship, with Chevrolet winning the GT Le Mans Manufacturers' Championship. The No. 48 Paul Miller Racing won the GT Daytona Teams' and Drivers' championship with Lamborghini winning the GT Daytona Manufacturers' Championsip.

== Series News ==
- 2018 was the final season Fox Sports televised the series, NBC Sports Group becomes the series' broadcaster, starting in 2019.
- 2018 was also the final season Continental Tire provided tires for competitors.

== Classes ==
- Prototype (P) (DPi and LMP2)
- GT Le Mans (GTLM)
- GT Daytona (GTD)

At the end of 2017 season, the Prototype Challenge (PC) class was reduced to a support series.

== Schedule ==
=== Race schedule ===
The 2018 schedule was released on August 4, 2017 and featured twelve rounds.

Race is part of the Patron North American Endurance Cup

Rnd.	Race	Length	Classes	Circuit	Location	Date
1	Rolex 24 at Daytona	24 hours	All	Daytona International Speedway	Daytona Beach, Florida	January 27–28
2	Mobil 1 Twelve Hours of Sebring	12 hours	All	Sebring International Raceway	Sebring, Florida	March 17
3	BUBBA Burger Sports Car Grand Prix at Long Beach	1 hour 40 minutes	P, GTLM	Long Beach Street Circuit	Long Beach, California	April 14
4	Acura Sports Car Challenge at Mid-Ohio	2 hours 40 minutes	All	Mid-Ohio Sports Car Course	Lexington, Ohio	May 6
5	Chevrolet Detroit Grand Prix	1 hour 40 minutes	P, GTD	The Raceway on Belle Isle	Detroit, Michigan	June 2
6	Sahlen's Six Hours of The Glen	6 hours	All	Watkins Glen International	Watkins Glen, New York	July 1
7	Mobil 1 SportsCar Grand Prix	2 hours 40 minutes	All	Canadian Tire Motorsport Park	Bowmanville, Ontario	July 8
8	Northeast Grand Prix	2 hours 40 minutes	GTLM, GTD	Lime Rock Park	Lakeville, Connecticut	July 21
9	Continental Tire Road Race Showcase	2 hours 40 minutes	All	Road America	Elkhart Lake, Wisconsin	August 5
10	Michelin GT Challenge at VIR	2 hours 40 minutes	GTLM, GTD	Virginia International Raceway	Alton, Virginia	August 19
11	Continental Tire Monterey Grand Prix	2 hours 40 minutes	All	WeatherTech Raceway Laguna Seca	Monterey, California	September 9
12	Motul Petit Le Mans	10 hours	All	Road Atlanta	Braselton, Georgia	October 13

=== Calendar changes ===
- The Circuit of the Americas was removed from the calendar, and replaced by a round at Mid-Ohio Sports Car Course.
- The GTD was removed from Long Beach due to space limitations.
- A non-championship round was held at Sebring in November 2018 with IMSA's 2019 rules for the GTD class, along with LMP3, GS, and TCR classes in the secondary series. This saw Michelin's debut as the 2019 series specification tire supplier.

== Entries ==
=== Prototype ===
The Prototype class is made up of LMP2 cars both in LMP2 trim, with the ACO specification Gibson V8 engine, and in Daytona Prototype international (DPi) trim, where manufacturers are allowed to use their own engines and bodykits, designed to reflect the automaker's design language. Acura (Oreca), Mazda (Riley Technologies), Cadillac (Dallara), and Nissan (Onroak Automotive) run chassis from the respective constructors featuring manufacturer-specific bodywork and engines.

Team	Chassis	Engine	No.	Drivers	Rounds
(United States) Tequila Patrón ESM	Nissan Onroak DPi	Nissan VR38DETT 3.8 L Turbo V6	2	(United Kingdom) Ryan Dalziel	1–6, 9, 11–12
(United States) Tequila Patrón ESM	Nissan Onroak DPi	Nissan VR38DETT 3.8 L Turbo V6	2	(United States) Scott Sharp	1–6, 9, 11–12
(United States) Tequila Patrón ESM	Nissan Onroak DPi	Nissan VR38DETT 3.8 L Turbo V6	2	(France) Olivier Pla	1–2, 6
(United States) Tequila Patrón ESM	Nissan Onroak DPi	Nissan VR38DETT 3.8 L Turbo V6	2	(France) Norman Nato	12
(United States) Tequila Patrón ESM	Nissan Onroak DPi	Nissan VR38DETT 3.8 L Turbo V6	22	(Brazil) Pipo Derani	All
(United States) Tequila Patrón ESM	Nissan Onroak DPi	Nissan VR38DETT 3.8 L Turbo V6	22	(United States) Johannes van Overbeek	1–6, 9, 11–12
(United States) Tequila Patrón ESM	Nissan Onroak DPi	Nissan VR38DETT 3.8 L Turbo V6	22	(France) Nicolas Lapierre	1–2, 6
(United States) Tequila Patrón ESM	Nissan Onroak DPi	Nissan VR38DETT 3.8 L Turbo V6	22	(United Kingdom) Ryan Dalziel	7
(United States) Tequila Patrón ESM	Nissan Onroak DPi	Nissan VR38DETT 3.8 L Turbo V6	22	(Germany) Timo Bernhard	12
(United States) / Mustang Sampling Racing (Note: Car No. 5 entered as Mustang Sampling Racing and car No. 31 entered as Whelen Engineering Racing.); (United States) / Whelen Engineering Racing	Cadillac DPi-V.R	Cadillac LT4 5.5 L V8	5	(Portugal) Filipe Albuquerque	All
(United States) / Mustang Sampling Racing; (United States) / Whelen Engineering Racing	Cadillac DPi-V.R	Cadillac LT4 5.5 L V8	5	(Portugal) João Barbosa	1–5, 9, 11
(United States) / Mustang Sampling Racing; (United States) / Whelen Engineering Racing	Cadillac DPi-V.R	Cadillac LT4 5.5 L V8	5	(Brazil) Christian Fittipaldi	1–2, 6–7, 12
(United States) / Mustang Sampling Racing; (United States) / Whelen Engineering Racing	Cadillac DPi-V.R	Cadillac LT4 5.5 L V8	5	(Colombia) Gabby Chaves	6
(United States) / Mustang Sampling Racing; (United States) / Whelen Engineering Racing	Cadillac DPi-V.R	Cadillac LT4 5.5 L V8	5	(France) Tristan Vautier	12
(United States) / Mustang Sampling Racing; (United States) / Whelen Engineering Racing	Cadillac DPi-V.R	Cadillac LT4 5.5 L V8	31	(United States) Eric Curran	All
(United States) / Mustang Sampling Racing; (United States) / Whelen Engineering Racing	Cadillac DPi-V.R	Cadillac LT4 5.5 L V8	31	(Brazil) Felipe Nasr	All
(United States) / Mustang Sampling Racing; (United States) / Whelen Engineering Racing	Cadillac DPi-V.R	Cadillac LT4 5.5 L V8	31	(United Kingdom) Mike Conway	1–2, 6
(United States) / Mustang Sampling Racing; (United States) / Whelen Engineering Racing	Cadillac DPi-V.R	Cadillac LT4 5.5 L V8	31	(United Kingdom) Stuart Middleton	1
(United States) / Mustang Sampling Racing; (United States) / Whelen Engineering Racing	Cadillac DPi-V.R	Cadillac LT4 5.5 L V8	31	(Colombia) Gabby Chaves	12
(United States) Acura Team Penske	Acura ARX-05	Acura AR35TT 3.5 L Turbo V6	6	(United States) Dane Cameron	All
(United States) Acura Team Penske	Acura ARX-05	Acura AR35TT 3.5 L Turbo V6	6	(Colombia) Juan Pablo Montoya	All
(United States) Acura Team Penske	Acura ARX-05	Acura AR35TT 3.5 L Turbo V6	6	(France) Simon Pagenaud	1–2, 12
(United States) Acura Team Penske	Acura ARX-05	Acura AR35TT 3.5 L Turbo V6	7	(Brazil) Hélio Castroneves	All
(United States) Acura Team Penske	Acura ARX-05	Acura AR35TT 3.5 L Turbo V6	7	(United States) Ricky Taylor	All
(United States) Acura Team Penske	Acura ARX-05	Acura AR35TT 3.5 L Turbo V6	7	(United States) Graham Rahal	1–2, 12
(United States) Wayne Taylor Racing	Cadillac DPi-V.R	Cadillac LT4 5.5 L V8	10	(United States) Jordan Taylor	All
(United States) Wayne Taylor Racing	Cadillac DPi-V.R	Cadillac LT4 5.5 L V8	10	(Netherlands) Renger van der Zande	All
(United States) Wayne Taylor Racing	Cadillac DPi-V.R	Cadillac LT4 5.5 L V8	10	(United States) Ryan Hunter-Reay	1–2, 12
(United States) BAR1 Motorsports	Riley Mk. 30	Gibson GK428 4.2 L V8	20	(United States) Marc Drumwright	1
(United States) BAR1 Motorsports	Riley Mk. 30	Gibson GK428 4.2 L V8	20	(United States) Brendan Gaughan	1
(United States) BAR1 Motorsports	Riley Mk. 30	Gibson GK428 4.2 L V8	20	(United States) Eric Lux	1
(United States) BAR1 Motorsports	Riley Mk. 30	Gibson GK428 4.2 L V8	20	(Venezuela) Alex Popow	1
(United States) United Autosports	Ligier JS P217	Gibson GK428 4.2 L V8	23	(Spain) Fernando Alonso	1
(United States) United Autosports	Ligier JS P217	Gibson GK428 4.2 L V8	23	(United Kingdom) Phil Hanson	1
(United States) United Autosports	Ligier JS P217	Gibson GK428 4.2 L V8	23	(United Kingdom) Lando Norris	1
(United States) United Autosports	Ligier JS P217	Gibson GK428 4.2 L V8	32	(United Kingdom) Paul di Resta	1–2, 6
(United States) United Autosports	Ligier JS P217	Gibson GK428 4.2 L V8	32	(Brazil) Bruno Senna	1, 6
(United States) United Autosports	Ligier JS P217	Gibson GK428 4.2 L V8	32	(United States) Will Owen	1
(United States) United Autosports	Ligier JS P217	Gibson GK428 4.2 L V8	32	(Switzerland) Hugo de Sadeleer	1
(United States) United Autosports	Ligier JS P217	Gibson GK428 4.2 L V8	32	(United Kingdom) Phil Hanson	2, 6
(United States) United Autosports	Ligier JS P217	Gibson GK428 4.2 L V8	32	(United Kingdom) Alex Brundle	2
(China) Jackie Chan DCR JOTA	Oreca 07	Gibson GK428 4.2 L V8	37	(Netherlands) Robin Frijns	1
(China) Jackie Chan DCR JOTA	Oreca 07	Gibson GK428 4.2 L V8	37	(Spain) Daniel Juncadella	1
(China) Jackie Chan DCR JOTA	Oreca 07	Gibson GK428 4.2 L V8	37	(Sweden) Felix Rosenqvist	1
(China) Jackie Chan DCR JOTA	Oreca 07	Gibson GK428 4.2 L V8	37	(Canada) Lance Stroll	1
(China) Jackie Chan DCR JOTA	Oreca 07	Gibson GK428 4.2 L V8	78	(United Kingdom) Alex Brundle	1
(China) Jackie Chan DCR JOTA	Oreca 07	Gibson GK428 4.2 L V8	78	(Portugal) António Félix da Costa	1
(China) Jackie Chan DCR JOTA	Oreca 07	Gibson GK428 4.2 L V8	78	(Austria) Ferdinand Habsburg-Lothringen	1
(China) Jackie Chan DCR JOTA	Oreca 07	Gibson GK428 4.2 L V8	78	(China) Ho-Pin Tung	1
(United States) Performance Tech Motorsports	Oreca 07	Gibson GK428 4.2 L V8	38	(United States) James French	1–4, 6–7, 12
(United States) Performance Tech Motorsports	Oreca 07	Gibson GK428 4.2 L V8	38	(United States) Kyle Masson	1–4, 6–7, 12
(United States) Performance Tech Motorsports	Oreca 07	Gibson GK428 4.2 L V8	38	(Mexico) Patricio O'Ward	1–2
(United States) Performance Tech Motorsports	Oreca 07	Gibson GK428 4.2 L V8	38	(United States) Joel Miller	1, 6
(United States) Performance Tech Motorsports	Oreca 07	Gibson GK428 4.2 L V8	38	(United States) Nicholas Boulle	12
(United States) AFS/PR1 Mathiasen Motorsports	Ligier JS P217; Oreca 07	Gibson GK428 4.2 L V8	52	(Colombia) Sebastián Saavedra	All
(United States) AFS/PR1 Mathiasen Motorsports	Ligier JS P217; Oreca 07	Gibson GK428 4.2 L V8	52	(Colombia) Gustavo Yacamán	1–7, 9, 11
(United States) AFS/PR1 Mathiasen Motorsports	Ligier JS P217; Oreca 07	Gibson GK428 4.2 L V8	52	(Mexico) Roberto González	1–2
(United States) AFS/PR1 Mathiasen Motorsports	Ligier JS P217; Oreca 07	Gibson GK428 4.2 L V8	52	(United States) Nicholas Boulle	1
(United States) AFS/PR1 Mathiasen Motorsports	Ligier JS P217; Oreca 07	Gibson GK428 4.2 L V8	52	(United States) Will Owen	6, 12
(United States) AFS/PR1 Mathiasen Motorsports	Ligier JS P217; Oreca 07	Gibson GK428 4.2 L V8	52	(Mexico) José Gutiérrez	12
(United States) CORE Autosport	Oreca 07	Gibson GK428 4.2 L V8	54	(United States) Jon Bennett	All
(United States) CORE Autosport	Oreca 07	Gibson GK428 4.2 L V8	54	(United States) Colin Braun	All
(United States) CORE Autosport	Oreca 07	Gibson GK428 4.2 L V8	54	(France) Romain Dumas	1–2, 6, 12
(United States) CORE Autosport	Oreca 07	Gibson GK428 4.2 L V8	54	(France) Loïc Duval	1
(Germany) Mazda Team Joest	Mazda RT24-P	Mazda MZ-2.0T 2.0 L Turbo I4	55	(United States) Jonathan Bomarito	All
(Germany) Mazda Team Joest	Mazda RT24-P	Mazda MZ-2.0T 2.0 L Turbo I4	55	(United Kingdom) Harry Tincknell	1–3, 5–7, 9, 11
(Germany) Mazda Team Joest	Mazda RT24-P	Mazda MZ-2.0T 2.0 L Turbo I4	55	(United States) Spencer Pigot	1–2, 4, 6, 12
(Germany) Mazda Team Joest	Mazda RT24-P	Mazda MZ-2.0T 2.0 L Turbo I4	55	(United Kingdom) Marino Franchitti	12
(Germany) Mazda Team Joest	Mazda RT24-P	Mazda MZ-2.0T 2.0 L Turbo I4	77	(United Kingdom) Oliver Jarvis	All
(Germany) Mazda Team Joest	Mazda RT24-P	Mazda MZ-2.0T 2.0 L Turbo I4	77	(United States) Tristan Nunez	All
(Germany) Mazda Team Joest	Mazda RT24-P	Mazda MZ-2.0T 2.0 L Turbo I4	77	(Germany) René Rast	1–2, 6
(Germany) Mazda Team Joest	Mazda RT24-P	Mazda MZ-2.0T 2.0 L Turbo I4	77	(Brazil) Lucas di Grassi	12
(United States) JDC-Miller MotorSports	Oreca 07	Gibson GK428 4.2 L V8	85	(United States) Robert Alon	All
(United States) JDC-Miller MotorSports	Oreca 07	Gibson GK428 4.2 L V8	85	(Switzerland) Simon Trummer	All
(United States) JDC-Miller MotorSports	Oreca 07	Gibson GK428 4.2 L V8	85	(United States) Austin Cindric	1
(United States) JDC-Miller MotorSports	Oreca 07	Gibson GK428 4.2 L V8	85	(Canada) Devlin DeFrancesco	1, 12
(United States) JDC-Miller MotorSports	Oreca 07	Gibson GK428 4.2 L V8	85	(France) Nelson Panciatici	2, 6
(United States) JDC-Miller MotorSports	Oreca 07	Gibson GK428 4.2 L V8	99	(Canada) Mikhail Goikhberg	All
(United States) JDC-Miller MotorSports	Oreca 07	Gibson GK428 4.2 L V8	99	(South Africa) Stephen Simpson	All
(United States) JDC-Miller MotorSports	Oreca 07	Gibson GK428 4.2 L V8	99	(United States) Chris Miller	1–2, 6, 12
(United States) JDC-Miller MotorSports	Oreca 07	Gibson GK428 4.2 L V8	99	(United States) Gustavo Menezes	1
(United States) Spirit of Daytona Racing	Cadillac DPi-V.R	Cadillac LT4 5.5 L V8	90	(United States) Matt McMurry	1–2, 5–6
(United States) Spirit of Daytona Racing	Cadillac DPi-V.R	Cadillac LT4 5.5 L V8	90	(France) Tristan Vautier	1–2, 5–6
(United States) Spirit of Daytona Racing	Cadillac DPi-V.R	Cadillac LT4 5.5 L V8	90	(Italy) Eddie Cheever III	1–2

=== GT Le Mans ===
Team	Chassis	Engine	No.	Drivers	Rounds
(United States) Corvette Racing	Chevrolet Corvette C7.R	Chevrolet LT5.5R 5.5 L V8	3	(Spain) Antonio García	All
(United States) Corvette Racing	Chevrolet Corvette C7.R	Chevrolet LT5.5R 5.5 L V8	3	(Denmark) Jan Magnussen	All
(United States) Corvette Racing	Chevrolet Corvette C7.R	Chevrolet LT5.5R 5.5 L V8	3	(Germany) Mike Rockenfeller	1–2
(United States) Corvette Racing	Chevrolet Corvette C7.R	Chevrolet LT5.5R 5.5 L V8	3	(Switzerland) Marcel Fässler	12
(United States) Corvette Racing	Chevrolet Corvette C7.R	Chevrolet LT5.5R 5.5 L V8	4	(United Kingdom) Oliver Gavin	All
(United States) Corvette Racing	Chevrolet Corvette C7.R	Chevrolet LT5.5R 5.5 L V8	4	(United States) Tommy Milner	All
(United States) Corvette Racing	Chevrolet Corvette C7.R	Chevrolet LT5.5R 5.5 L V8	4	(Switzerland) Marcel Fässler	1–2, 12
(United States) BMW Team RLL	BMW M8 GTE	BMW S63 4.0 L Turbo V8	24	(United States) John Edwards	All
(United States) BMW Team RLL	BMW M8 GTE	BMW S63 4.0 L Turbo V8	24	(Finland) Jesse Krohn	All
(United States) BMW Team RLL	BMW M8 GTE	BMW S63 4.0 L Turbo V8	24	(Netherlands) Nick Catsburg	1–2
(United States) BMW Team RLL	BMW M8 GTE	BMW S63 4.0 L Turbo V8	24	(Brazil) Augusto Farfus	1
(United States) BMW Team RLL	BMW M8 GTE	BMW S63 4.0 L Turbo V8	24	(United Kingdom) Tom Blomqvist	6
(United States) BMW Team RLL	BMW M8 GTE	BMW S63 4.0 L Turbo V8	24	(Australia) Chaz Mostert	12
(United States) BMW Team RLL	BMW M8 GTE	BMW S63 4.0 L Turbo V8	25	(United States) Connor De Phillippi	All
(United States) BMW Team RLL	BMW M8 GTE	BMW S63 4.0 L Turbo V8	25	(United Kingdom) Alexander Sims	All
(United States) BMW Team RLL	BMW M8 GTE	BMW S63 4.0 L Turbo V8	25	(United States) Bill Auberlen	1–2, 6, 12
(United States) BMW Team RLL	BMW M8 GTE	BMW S63 4.0 L Turbo V8	25	(Austria) Philipp Eng	1
(United States) Risi Competizione	Ferrari 488 GTE	Ferrari F154CB 4.0 L Turbo V8	62	(Finland) Toni Vilander	1–2, 12
(United States) Risi Competizione	Ferrari 488 GTE	Ferrari F154CB 4.0 L Turbo V8	62	(United Kingdom) James Calado	1–2
(United States) Risi Competizione	Ferrari 488 GTE	Ferrari F154CB 4.0 L Turbo V8	62	(Italy) Alessandro Pier Guidi	1–2
(United States) Risi Competizione	Ferrari 488 GTE	Ferrari F154CB 4.0 L Turbo V8	62	(Italy) Davide Rigon	1
(United States) Risi Competizione	Ferrari 488 GTE	Ferrari F154CB 4.0 L Turbo V8	62	(Italy) Andrea Bertolini	12
(United States) Risi Competizione	Ferrari 488 GTE	Ferrari F154CB 4.0 L Turbo V8	62	(Spain) Miguel Molina	12
(United States) Ford Chip Ganassi Racing	Ford GT	Ford EcoBoost D35 3.5 L Turbo V6	66	(United States) Joey Hand	All
(United States) Ford Chip Ganassi Racing	Ford GT	Ford EcoBoost D35 3.5 L Turbo V6	66	(Germany) Dirk Müller	All
(United States) Ford Chip Ganassi Racing	Ford GT	Ford EcoBoost D35 3.5 L Turbo V6	66	(France) Sébastien Bourdais	1–2, 12
(United States) Ford Chip Ganassi Racing	Ford GT	Ford EcoBoost D35 3.5 L Turbo V6	67	(Australia) Ryan Briscoe	All
(United States) Ford Chip Ganassi Racing	Ford GT	Ford EcoBoost D35 3.5 L Turbo V6	67	(United Kingdom) Richard Westbrook	All
(United States) Ford Chip Ganassi Racing	Ford GT	Ford EcoBoost D35 3.5 L Turbo V6	67	(New Zealand) Scott Dixon	1–2, 12
(United States) Porsche GT Team	Porsche 911 RSR	Porsche M97/80 4.0 L Flat-6	911	(France) Patrick Pilet	All
(United States) Porsche GT Team	Porsche 911 RSR	Porsche M97/80 4.0 L Flat-6	911	(United Kingdom) Nick Tandy	All
(United States) Porsche GT Team	Porsche 911 RSR	Porsche M97/80 4.0 L Flat-6	911	(France) Frédéric Makowiecki	1–2, 12
(United States) Porsche GT Team	Porsche 911 RSR	Porsche M97/80 4.0 L Flat-6	912	(New Zealand) Earl Bamber	All
(United States) Porsche GT Team	Porsche 911 RSR	Porsche M97/80 4.0 L Flat-6	912	(Belgium) Laurens Vanthoor	All
(United States) Porsche GT Team	Porsche 911 RSR	Porsche M97/80 4.0 L Flat-6	912	(Italy) Gianmaria Bruni	1–2
(United States) Porsche GT Team	Porsche 911 RSR	Porsche M97/80 4.0 L Flat-6	912	(France) Mathieu Jaminet	12

=== GT Daytona ===
Team	Chassis	Engine	No.	Drivers	Rounds
(Austria) GRT Grasser Racing Team	Lamborghini Huracán GT3	Lamborghini DFJ 5.2 L V10	11	(Italy) Mirko Bortolotti	1
(Austria) GRT Grasser Racing Team	Lamborghini Huracán GT3	Lamborghini DFJ 5.2 L V10	11	(Netherlands) Rik Breukers	1
(Austria) GRT Grasser Racing Team	Lamborghini Huracán GT3	Lamborghini DFJ 5.2 L V10	11	(Switzerland) Rolf Ineichen	1
(Austria) GRT Grasser Racing Team	Lamborghini Huracán GT3	Lamborghini DFJ 5.2 L V10	11	(France) Franck Perera	1
(Austria) GRT Grasser Racing Team	Lamborghini Huracán GT3	Lamborghini DFJ 5.2 L V10	19	(Germany) Christian Engelhart	1
(Austria) GRT Grasser Racing Team	Lamborghini Huracán GT3	Lamborghini DFJ 5.2 L V10	19	(Switzerland) Christoph Lenz	1
(Austria) GRT Grasser Racing Team	Lamborghini Huracán GT3	Lamborghini DFJ 5.2 L V10	19	(Belgium) Louis Machiels	1
(Austria) GRT Grasser Racing Team	Lamborghini Huracán GT3	Lamborghini DFJ 5.2 L V10	19	(Argentina) Ezequiel Pérez Companc	1
(Austria) GRT Grasser Racing Team	Lamborghini Huracán GT3	Lamborghini DFJ 5.2 L V10	19	(Netherlands) Max van Splunteren	1
(United States) 3GT Racing	Lexus RC F GT3	Lexus 2UR-GSE 5.4 L V8	14	(Austria) Dominik Baumann	All
(United States) 3GT Racing	Lexus RC F GT3	Lexus 2UR-GSE 5.4 L V8	14	(Canada) Kyle Marcelli	All
(United States) 3GT Racing	Lexus RC F GT3	Lexus 2UR-GSE 5.4 L V8	14	(Switzerland) Philipp Frommenwiler	1–2, 12
(United States) 3GT Racing	Lexus RC F GT3	Lexus 2UR-GSE 5.4 L V8	14	(Brazil) Bruno Junqueira	1
(United States) 3GT Racing	Lexus RC F GT3	Lexus 2UR-GSE 5.4 L V8	15	(United Kingdom) Jack Hawksworth	All
(United States) 3GT Racing	Lexus RC F GT3	Lexus 2UR-GSE 5.4 L V8	15	(Denmark) David Heinemeier Hansson	1–2, 4–7, 9–12
(United States) 3GT Racing	Lexus RC F GT3	Lexus 2UR-GSE 5.4 L V8	15	(Germany) Dominik Farnbacher	1
(United States) 3GT Racing	Lexus RC F GT3	Lexus 2UR-GSE 5.4 L V8	15	(United States) Scott Pruett	1
(United States) 3GT Racing	Lexus RC F GT3	Lexus 2UR-GSE 5.4 L V8	15	(United States) Sean Rayhall	2, 12
(United States) 3GT Racing	Lexus RC F GT3	Lexus 2UR-GSE 5.4 L V8	15	(Germany) Mario Farnbacher	6, 8
(United States) Wright Motorsports	Porsche 911 GT3 R	Porsche 4.0 L Flat-6	16	(Germany) Wolf Henzler	4–5, 7
(United States) Wright Motorsports	Porsche 911 GT3 R	Porsche 4.0 L Flat-6	16	(United States) Michael Schein	4–5, 7
(United States) Wright Motorsports	Porsche 911 GT3 R	Porsche 4.0 L Flat-6	58	(United States) Patrick Long	All
(United States) Wright Motorsports	Porsche 911 GT3 R	Porsche 4.0 L Flat-6	58	(Denmark) Christina Nielsen	All
(United States) Wright Motorsports	Porsche 911 GT3 R	Porsche 4.0 L Flat-6	58	(Germany) Robert Renauer	1–2, 6, 12
(United States) Wright Motorsports	Porsche 911 GT3 R	Porsche 4.0 L Flat-6	58	(France) Mathieu Jaminet	1–2
(Germany) Montaplast by Land-Motorsport	Audi R8 LMS	Audi DAR 5.2 L V10	29	(South Africa) Sheldon van der Linde	1–2, 6, 12
(Germany) Montaplast by Land-Motorsport	Audi R8 LMS	Audi DAR 5.2 L V10	29	(Germany) Christopher Mies	1–2, 6, 12
(Germany) Montaplast by Land-Motorsport	Audi R8 LMS	Audi DAR 5.2 L V10	29	(South Africa) Kelvin van der Linde	1
(Germany) Montaplast by Land-Motorsport	Audi R8 LMS	Audi DAR 5.2 L V10	29	(Switzerland) Jeffrey Schmidt	1
(Germany) Montaplast by Land-Motorsport	Audi R8 LMS	Audi DAR 5.2 L V10	29	(Belgium) Alessio Picariello	2
(Germany) Montaplast by Land-Motorsport	Audi R8 LMS	Audi DAR 5.2 L V10	29	(Canada) Daniel Morad	12
(United States) (Australia) / Mercedes-AMG Team Riley Motorsports (Note: Car No. 33 entered as Mercedes-AMG Team Riley Motorsports under an American license and car No. 75 entered as SunEnergy1 Racing under an Australian license.); (United States) (Australia) / SunEnergy1 Racing	Mercedes-AMG GT3	Mercedes-AMG M159 6.2 L V8	33	(Netherlands) Jeroen Bleekemolen	All
(United States) (Australia) / Mercedes-AMG Team Riley Motorsports; (United States) (Australia) / SunEnergy1 Racing	Mercedes-AMG GT3	Mercedes-AMG M159 6.2 L V8	33	(United States) Ben Keating	All
(United States) (Australia) / Mercedes-AMG Team Riley Motorsports; (United States) (Australia) / SunEnergy1 Racing	Mercedes-AMG GT3	Mercedes-AMG M159 6.2 L V8	33	(Germany) Luca Stolz	1–2, 6, 12
(United States) (Australia) / Mercedes-AMG Team Riley Motorsports; (United States) (Australia) / SunEnergy1 Racing	Mercedes-AMG GT3	Mercedes-AMG M159 6.2 L V8	33	(United Kingdom) Adam Christodoulou	1
(United States) (Australia) / Mercedes-AMG Team Riley Motorsports; (United States) (Australia) / SunEnergy1 Racing	Mercedes-AMG GT3	Mercedes-AMG M159 6.2 L V8	75	(Australia) Kenny Habul	1–2, 4–6
(United States) (Australia) / Mercedes-AMG Team Riley Motorsports; (United States) (Australia) / SunEnergy1 Racing	Mercedes-AMG GT3	Mercedes-AMG M159 6.2 L V8	75	(Canada) Mikaël Grenier	1–2, 6
(United States) (Australia) / Mercedes-AMG Team Riley Motorsports; (United States) (Australia) / SunEnergy1 Racing	Mercedes-AMG GT3	Mercedes-AMG M159 6.2 L V8	75	(Germany) Thomas Jäger	1–2, 6
(United States) (Australia) / Mercedes-AMG Team Riley Motorsports; (United States) (Australia) / SunEnergy1 Racing	Mercedes-AMG GT3	Mercedes-AMG M159 6.2 L V8	75	(Germany) Maro Engel	1, 4
(United States) (Australia) / Mercedes-AMG Team Riley Motorsports; (United States) (Australia) / SunEnergy1 Racing	Mercedes-AMG GT3	Mercedes-AMG M159 6.2 L V8	75	(Germany) Bernd Schneider	5
(United States) CJ Wilson Racing	Acura NSX GT3	Acura JNC1 3.5 L Turbo V6	36	(United Kingdom) Till Bechtolsheimer	2, 6
(United States) CJ Wilson Racing	Acura NSX GT3	Acura JNC1 3.5 L Turbo V6	36	(United States) Marc Miller	2, 6
(United States) CJ Wilson Racing	Acura NSX GT3	Acura JNC1 3.5 L Turbo V6	36	(Canada) Kuno Wittmer	2
(United States) Magnus Racing	Audi R8 LMS	Audi DAR 5.2 L V10	44	(United States) Andy Lally	All
(United States) Magnus Racing	Audi R8 LMS	Audi DAR 5.2 L V10	44	(United States) John Potter	All
(United States) Magnus Racing	Audi R8 LMS	Audi DAR 5.2 L V10	44	(United States) Andrew Davis	1–2, 6, 12
(United States) Magnus Racing	Audi R8 LMS	Audi DAR 5.2 L V10	44	(Germany) Markus Winkelhock	1
(United States) Paul Miller Racing	Lamborghini Huracán GT3	Lamborghini DFJ 5.2 L V10	48	(United States) Bryan Sellers	All
(United States) Paul Miller Racing	Lamborghini Huracán GT3	Lamborghini DFJ 5.2 L V10	48	(United States) Madison Snow	All
(United States) Paul Miller Racing	Lamborghini Huracán GT3	Lamborghini DFJ 5.2 L V10	48	(Italy) Andrea Caldarelli	1
(United States) Paul Miller Racing	Lamborghini Huracán GT3	Lamborghini DFJ 5.2 L V10	48	(United States) Bryce Miller	1
(United States) Paul Miller Racing	Lamborghini Huracán GT3	Lamborghini DFJ 5.2 L V10	48	(United States) Corey Lewis	2, 12
(Italy) Squadra Corse Garage Italia (Note: Car No. 51 entered as Spirit of Race at Rounds 1–2.)	Ferrari 488 GT3	Ferrari F154CB 3.9 L Turbo V8	51	(Brazil) Daniel Serra	1–2, 6
(Italy) Squadra Corse Garage Italia	Ferrari 488 GT3	Ferrari F154CB 3.9 L Turbo V8	51	(Canada) Paul Dalla Lana	1–2
(Italy) Squadra Corse Garage Italia	Ferrari 488 GT3	Ferrari F154CB 3.9 L Turbo V8	51	(Portugal) Pedro Lamy	1–2
(Italy) Squadra Corse Garage Italia	Ferrari 488 GT3	Ferrari F154CB 3.9 L Turbo V8	51	(Austria) Mathias Lauda	1–2
(Italy) Squadra Corse Garage Italia	Ferrari 488 GT3	Ferrari F154CB 3.9 L Turbo V8	51	(Brazil) Oswaldo Negri Jr.	6, 9, 11
(Italy) Squadra Corse Garage Italia	Ferrari 488 GT3	Ferrari F154CB 3.9 L Turbo V8	51	(United States) Francesco Piovanetti	6, 9, 11
(Germany) Manthey Racing	Porsche 911 GT3 R	Porsche 4.0 L Flat-6	59	(Italy) Matteo Cairoli	1
(Germany) Manthey Racing	Porsche 911 GT3 R	Porsche 4.0 L Flat-6	59	(Germany) Sven Müller	1
(Germany) Manthey Racing	Porsche 911 GT3 R	Porsche 4.0 L Flat-6	59	(Austria) Harald Proczyk	1
(Germany) Manthey Racing	Porsche 911 GT3 R	Porsche 4.0 L Flat-6	59	(Germany) Steve Smith	1
(Germany) Manthey Racing	Porsche 911 GT3 R	Porsche 4.0 L Flat-6	59	(Germany) Randy Walls	1
(United States) Scuderia Corsa	Ferrari 488 GT3	Ferrari F154CB 3.9 L Turbo V8	63	(United States) Cooper MacNeil	All
(United States) Scuderia Corsa	Ferrari 488 GT3	Ferrari F154CB 3.9 L Turbo V8	63	(Italy) Alessandro Balzan	1–2, 4
(United States) Scuderia Corsa	Ferrari 488 GT3	Ferrari F154CB 3.9 L Turbo V8	63	(United States) Gunnar Jeannette	1–2, 6, 8, 10–12
(United States) Scuderia Corsa	Ferrari 488 GT3	Ferrari F154CB 3.9 L Turbo V8	63	(United States) Jeff Segal	1, 5–7
(United States) Scuderia Corsa	Ferrari 488 GT3	Ferrari F154CB 3.9 L Turbo V8	63	(Italy) Alessandro Pier Guidi	9
(United States) Scuderia Corsa	Ferrari 488 GT3	Ferrari F154CB 3.9 L Turbo V8	63	(Brazil) Daniel Serra	12
(United States) Scuderia Corsa	Ferrari 488 GT3	Ferrari F154CB 3.9 L Turbo V8	64	(United States) Townsend Bell	1–2, 6, 11–12
(United States) Scuderia Corsa	Ferrari 488 GT3	Ferrari F154CB 3.9 L Turbo V8	64	(United States) Frankie Montecalvo	1–2, 6, 11–12
(United States) Scuderia Corsa	Ferrari 488 GT3	Ferrari F154CB 3.9 L Turbo V8	64	(United States) Bill Sweedler	1–2, 6
(United States) Scuderia Corsa	Ferrari 488 GT3	Ferrari F154CB 3.9 L Turbo V8	64	(United Kingdom) Sam Bird	1
(United States) Scuderia Corsa	Ferrari 488 GT3	Ferrari F154CB 3.9 L Turbo V8	64	(Italy) Matteo Cressoni	12
(United States) HART	Acura NSX GT3	Acura JNC1 3.5 L Turbo V6	69	(United States) Ryan Eversley	1–2, 6
(United States) HART	Acura NSX GT3	Acura JNC1 3.5 L Turbo V6	69	(United States) Chad Gilsinger	1–2, 6
(United States) HART	Acura NSX GT3	Acura JNC1 3.5 L Turbo V6	69	(United States) John Falb	1
(United States) HART	Acura NSX GT3	Acura JNC1 3.5 L Turbo V6	69	(United States) Sean Rayhall	1
(United States) HART	Acura NSX GT3	Acura JNC1 3.5 L Turbo V6	69	(United States) Tom Dyer	2, 6
(United States) P1 Motorsports	Mercedes-AMG GT3	Mercedes-AMG M159 6.2 L V8	71	(Colombia) J. C. Perez	1–2, 6, 12
(United States) P1 Motorsports	Mercedes-AMG GT3	Mercedes-AMG M159 6.2 L V8	71	(Italy) Loris Spinelli	1–2, 6
(United States) P1 Motorsports	Mercedes-AMG GT3	Mercedes-AMG M159 6.2 L V8	71	(United States) Kenton Koch	1–2
(United States) P1 Motorsports	Mercedes-AMG GT3	Mercedes-AMG M159 6.2 L V8	71	(United States) Robby Foley	1
(United States) P1 Motorsports	Mercedes-AMG GT3	Mercedes-AMG M159 6.2 L V8	71	(Canada) Daniel Morad	6
(United States) P1 Motorsports	Mercedes-AMG GT3	Mercedes-AMG M159 6.2 L V8	71	(Brazil) Felipe Fraga	12
(United States) P1 Motorsports	Mercedes-AMG GT3	Mercedes-AMG M159 6.2 L V8	71	(Germany) Maximilian Buhk	12
(United States) Park Place Motorsports	Porsche 911 GT3 R	Porsche 4.0 L Flat-6	73	(Germany) Jörg Bergmeister	1–2, 6, 9, 11
(United States) Park Place Motorsports	Porsche 911 GT3 R	Porsche 4.0 L Flat-6	73	(United States) Patrick Lindsey	1–2, 6, 9, 11
(United States) Park Place Motorsports	Porsche 911 GT3 R	Porsche 4.0 L Flat-6	73	(United States) Tim Pappas	1–2, 12
(United States) Park Place Motorsports	Porsche 911 GT3 R	Porsche 4.0 L Flat-6	73	(Austria) Norbert Siedler	1
(United States) Park Place Motorsports	Porsche 911 GT3 R	Porsche 4.0 L Flat-6	73	(United States) Spencer Pumpelly	12
(United States) Park Place Motorsports	Porsche 911 GT3 R	Porsche 4.0 L Flat-6	73	(Germany) Wolf Henzler	12
(United States) Risi Competizione	Ferrari 488 GT3	Ferrari F154CB 3.9 L Turbo V8	82	(Mexico) Santiago Creel	1
(United States) Risi Competizione	Ferrari 488 GT3	Ferrari F154CB 3.9 L Turbo V8	82	(Mexico) Martin Fuentes	1
(United States) Risi Competizione	Ferrari 488 GT3	Ferrari F154CB 3.9 L Turbo V8	82	(Republic of Ireland) Matt Griffin	1
(United States) Risi Competizione	Ferrari 488 GT3	Ferrari F154CB 3.9 L Turbo V8	82	(Spain) Miguel Molina	1
(United States) Risi Competizione	Ferrari 488 GT3	Ferrari F154CB 3.9 L Turbo V8	82	(Mexico) Ricardo Pérez de Lara	1
(United States) Meyer Shank Racing with Curb-Agajanian	Acura NSX GT3	Acura JNC1 3.5 L Turbo V6	86	(United Kingdom) Katherine Legge	All
(United States) Meyer Shank Racing with Curb-Agajanian	Acura NSX GT3	Acura JNC1 3.5 L Turbo V6	86	(Portugal) Álvaro Parente	1–2, 4, 6–9, 11–12
(United States) Meyer Shank Racing with Curb-Agajanian	Acura NSX GT3	Acura JNC1 3.5 L Turbo V6	86	(United States) Trent Hindman	1–2, 12
(United States) Meyer Shank Racing with Curb-Agajanian	Acura NSX GT3	Acura JNC1 3.5 L Turbo V6	86	(United States) A. J. Allmendinger	1
(United States) Meyer Shank Racing with Curb-Agajanian	Acura NSX GT3	Acura JNC1 3.5 L Turbo V6	86	(Germany) Mario Farnbacher	5, 10
(United States) Meyer Shank Racing with Curb-Agajanian	Acura NSX GT3	Acura JNC1 3.5 L Turbo V6	93	(United States) Justin Marks	All
(United States) Meyer Shank Racing with Curb-Agajanian	Acura NSX GT3	Acura JNC1 3.5 L Turbo V6	93	(United States) Lawson Aschenbach	All
(United States) Meyer Shank Racing with Curb-Agajanian	Acura NSX GT3	Acura JNC1 3.5 L Turbo V6	93	(Germany) Mario Farnbacher	1–2, 12
(United States) Meyer Shank Racing with Curb-Agajanian	Acura NSX GT3	Acura JNC1 3.5 L Turbo V6	93	(France) Côme Ledogar	1
(United States) Turner Motorsport	BMW M6 GT3	BMW S63 4.4 L Turbo V8	96	(United States) Don Yount	1–2, 6, 12
(United States) Turner Motorsport	BMW M6 GT3	BMW S63 4.4 L Turbo V8	96	(Germany) Jens Klingmann	1
(United States) Turner Motorsport	BMW M6 GT3	BMW S63 4.4 L Turbo V8	96	(United States) Mark Kvamme	1
(United States) Turner Motorsport	BMW M6 GT3	BMW S63 4.4 L Turbo V8	96	(United States) Cameron Lawrence	1
(United States) Turner Motorsport	BMW M6 GT3	BMW S63 4.4 L Turbo V8	96	(Germany) Martin Tomczyk	1
(United States) Turner Motorsport	BMW M6 GT3	BMW S63 4.4 L Turbo V8	96	(United States) Dillon Machavern	2, 4, 6, 12
(United States) Turner Motorsport	BMW M6 GT3	BMW S63 4.4 L Turbo V8	96	(Finland) Markus Palttala	2, 6, 9, 12
(United States) Turner Motorsport	BMW M6 GT3	BMW S63 4.4 L Turbo V8	96	(United States) Bill Auberlen	4–5, 7–8, 10–11
(United States) Turner Motorsport	BMW M6 GT3	BMW S63 4.4 L Turbo V8	96	(United States) Robby Foley	5, 7–11

== Race results ==
Bold indicates overall winner.

Rnd	Circuit	Prototype Winning Team	GTLM Winning Team	GTD Winning Team	Report
Rnd	Circuit	Prototype Winning Drivers	GTLM Winning Drivers	GTD Winning Drivers	Report
1	Daytona	**(United States) No. 5 Mustang Sampling Racing**	(United States) No. 67 Ford Chip Ganassi Racing	(Austria) No. 11 GRT Grasser Racing Team	Report
1	Daytona	**(Portugal) Filipe Albuquerque** **(Portugal) João Barbosa** **(Brazil) Christian Fittipaldi**	(Australia) Ryan Briscoe (New Zealand) Scott Dixon (United Kingdom) Richard Westbrook	(Italy) Mirko Bortolotti (Netherlands) Rik Breukers (Switzerland) Rolf Ineichen (France) Franck Perera	Report
2	Sebring	**(United States) No. 22 Tequila Patrón ESM**	(United States) No. 911 Porsche GT Team	(United States) No. 48 Paul Miller Racing	Report
2	Sebring	**(Brazil) Pipo Derani** **(France) Nicolas Lapierre** **(United States) Johannes van Overbeek**	(France) Frédéric Makowiecki (France) Patrick Pilet (United Kingdom) Nick Tandy	(United States) Corey Lewis (United States) Bryan Sellers (United States) Madison Snow	Report
3	Long Beach	**(United States) No. 5 Mustang Sampling Racing**	(United States) No. 4 Corvette Racing	did not participate	Report
3	Long Beach	**(Portugal) Filipe Albuquerque** **(Portugal) João Barbosa**	(United Kingdom) Oliver Gavin (United States) Tommy Milner	did not participate	Report
4	Mid-Ohio	**(United States) No. 7 Acura Team Penske**	(United States) No. 912 Porsche GT Team	(United States) No. 14 3GT Racing	Report
4	Mid-Ohio	**(Brazil) Hélio Castroneves** **(United States) Ricky Taylor**	(New Zealand) Earl Bamber (Belgium) Laurens Vanthoor	(Austria) Dominik Baumann (Canada) Kyle Marcelli	Report
5	Belle Isle	**(United States) No. 31 Whelen Engineering Racing**	did not participate	(United States) No. 86 Meyer Shank Racing with Curb-Agajanian	Report
5	Belle Isle	**(United States) Eric Curran** **(Brazil) Felipe Nasr**	did not participate	(Germany) Mario Farnbacher (United Kingdom) Katherine Legge	Report
6	Watkins Glen	**(United States) No. 99 JDC-Miller MotorSports**	(United States) No. 66 Ford Chip Ganassi Racing	(United States) No. 96 Turner Motorsport	Report
6	Watkins Glen	**(Canada) Mikhail Goikhberg** **(United States) Chris Miller** **(South Africa) Stephen Simpson**	(United States) Joey Hand (Germany) Dirk Müller	(United States) Dillon Machavern (Finland) Markus Palttala (United States) Don Yount	Report
7	Mosport	**(United States) No. 54 CORE Autosport**	(United States) No. 67 Ford Chip Ganassi Racing	(United States) No. 33 Mercedes-AMG Team Riley Motorsports	Report
7	Mosport	**(United States) Jon Bennett** **(United States) Colin Braun**	(Australia) Ryan Briscoe (United Kingdom) Richard Westbrook	(Netherlands) Jeroen Bleekemolen (United States) Ben Keating	Report
8	Lime Rock	did not participate	**(United States) No. 66 Ford Chip Ganassi Racing**	(United States) No. 48 Paul Miller Racing	Report
8	Lime Rock	did not participate	**(United States) Joey Hand** **(Germany) Dirk Müller**	(United States) Bryan Sellers (United States) Madison Snow	Report
9	Road America	**(United States) No. 54 CORE Autosport**	(United States) No. 67 Ford Chip Ganassi Racing	(United States) No. 58 Wright Motorsports	Report
9	Road America	**(United States) Jon Bennett** **(United States) Colin Braun**	(Australia) Ryan Briscoe (United Kingdom) Richard Westbrook	(United States) Patrick Long (Denmark) Christina Nielsen	Report
10	Virginia	did not participate	**(United States) No. 25 BMW Team RLL**	(United States) No. 14 3GT Racing	Report
10	Virginia	did not participate	**(United States) Connor De Phillippi** **(United Kingdom) Alexander Sims**	(Austria) Dominik Baumann (Canada) Kyle Marcelli	Report
11	Laguna Seca	**(United States) No. 22 Tequila Patrón ESM**	(United States) No. 25 BMW Team RLL	(United States) No. 86 Meyer Shank Racing with Curb-Agajanian	Report
11	Laguna Seca	**(Brazil) Pipo Derani** **(United States) Johannes van Overbeek**	(United States) Connor De Phillippi (United Kingdom) Alexander Sims	(United Kingdom) Katherine Legge (Portugal) Álvaro Parente	Report
12	Road Atlanta	**(United States) No. 10 Wayne Taylor Racing**	(United States) No. 911 Porsche GT Team	(United States) No. 63 Scuderia Corsa	Report
12	Road Atlanta	**(United States) Ryan Hunter-Reay** **(United States) Jordan Taylor** **(Netherlands) Renger van der Zande**	(France) Frédéric Makowiecki (France) Patrick Pilet (United Kingdom) Nick Tandy	(United States) Gunnar Jeannette (United States) Cooper MacNeil (Brazil) Daniel Serra	Report

== Championship standings ==
=== Points systems ===
Championship points are awarded in each class at the finish of each event. Points are awarded based on finishing positions as shown in the chart below.

Position	1	2	3	4	5	6	7	8	9	10	11	12	13	14	15	16	17	18	19	20	21	22	23	24	25	26	27	28	29	30
Race	35	32	30	28	26	25	24	23	22	21	20	19	18	17	16	15	14	13	12	11	10	9	8	7	6	5	4	3	2	1

Drivers points

Points are awarded in each class at the finish of each event.

Team points

Team points are calculated in exactly the same way as driver points, using the point distribution chart. Each car entered is considered its own "team" regardless if it is a single entry or part of a two-car team.

Manufacturer points

There are also a number of manufacturer championships which utilize the same season-long point distribution chart. The manufacturer championships recognized by IMSA are as follows:

Prototype (P): Engine manufacturer
GT Le Mans (GTLM): Car manufacturer
GT Daytona (GTD): Car manufacturer

Each manufacturer receives finishing points for its highest finishing car in each class. The positions of subsequent finishing cars from the same manufacturer are not taken into consideration, and all other manufacturers move up in the order.

Example: Manufacturer A finishes 1st and 2nd at an event, and Manufacturer B finishes 3rd. Manufacturer A receives 35 first-place points while Manufacturer B would earn 32 second-place points.

North American Endurance Cup

The points system for the North American Endurance Cup is different from the normal points system. Points are awarded on a 5-4-3-2 basis for drivers, teams and manufacturers. The first finishing position at each interval earns five points, four points for second position, three points for third, with two points awarded for fourth and each subsequent finishing position.

Position	1	2	3	Other Classified
Race	5	4	3	2

At Daytona (24 hour race), points are awarded at six hours, 12 hours, 18 hours and at the finish. At the Sebring (12 hour race), points are awarded at four hours, eight hours and at the finish. At Watkins Glen (6 hour race), points are awarded at three hours and at the finish. At Road Atlanta (10 hour race), points are awarded at four hours, eight hours and at the finish.

Like the season-long team championship, North American Endurance Cup team points are awarded for each car and drivers get points in any car that they drive, in which they are entered for points. The manufacturer points go to the highest placed car from that manufacturer (the others from that manufacturer not being counted), just like the season-long manufacturer championship.

For example: in any particular segment manufacturer A finishes 1st and 2nd and manufacturer B finishes 3rd. Manufacturer A only receives first-place points for that segment. Manufacturer B receives the second-place points.

=== Drivers' championships ===
Race is part of the North American Endurance Cup

==== Prototype ====
Pos.	Driver	**DAY**	**SEB**	LBH	MOH	BEL	**WGL**	MOS	ELK	LGA	**ATL**	Points	NAEC
1	(United States) Eric Curran (Brazil) Felipe Nasr	2	3	7	8	1	7	3	3	5	8	277	40
2	(United States) Jon Bennett (United States) Colin Braun	3	4	10	13	12	2	1	1	2	7	274	28
3	(United States) Jordan Taylor (Netherlands) Renger van der Zande	**15**	2	3	5	5	5	2	4	**12**	1	270	32
4	(Canada) Mikhail Goikhberg (South Africa) Stephen Simpson	7	7	8	7	11	1	7	2	6	10	252	27
5	(United States) Dane Cameron (Colombia) Juan Pablo Montoya	10	14	**5**	2	3	3	**10**	5	3	13	251	30
6	(Portugal) Filipe Albuquerque	1	10	1	4	6	6	4	7	DNS	4	249	31
7	(Brazil) Hélio Castroneves (United States) Ricky Taylor	9	15	6	**1**	2	12	5	10	10	5	243	32
8	(United Kingdom) Oliver Jarvis (United States) Tristan Nunez	17	8	4	3	9	13	6	11	9	2	234	28
9	(Brazil) Pipo Derani	18	1	12	9	**7**	16	12	6	1	**6**	232	31
10	(United States) Jonathan Bomarito	16	6	9	14	14	10	11	8	4	3	218	28
11	(United States) Robert Alon (Switzerland) Simon Trummer	6	9	13	12	10	8	8	**12**	7	9	216	14
12	(United States) Johannes van Overbeek	18	1	12	9	**7**	15		6	1	**6**	213	31
13	(Colombia) Sebastián Saavedra	12	11	11	6	8	9	9	13	8	12	211	24
14	(United Kingdom) Ryan Dalziel	19	16	2	10	4	15	12	9	11	11	205	24
15	(Colombia) Gustavo Yacamán	12	11	11	6	8	9	9	13	8		192	18
16	(United States) Scott Sharp	19	16	2	10	4	16		9	11	11	186	24
17	(United Kingdom) Harry Tincknell	16	6	9		14	10	11	8	4		171	21
18	(Portugal) João Barbosa	1	10	1	4	6			7	DNS		168	21
19	(Brazil) Christian Fittipaldi	1	10				6	4			4	137	31
20	(France) Romain Dumas	3	4				2				7	114	28
21	(United States) James French (United States) Kyle Masson	8	13	14	11	14	14	DNS			14	112	24
22	(United States) Spencer Pigot	16	6		14		10				3	108	28
23	(United States) Chris Miller	7	7				1				10	104	27
24	(France) Tristan Vautier	20	**12**			13	11				4	96	24
25	(United Kingdom) Mike Conway	2	3				7					86	27
26	(United States) Ryan Hunter-Reay	**15**	2								1	83	28
27	(United Kingdom) Paul di Resta	4	5				**4**					82	16
28	(United Kingdom) Phil Hanson	13	5				**4**					72	15
29	(United States) Will Owen	4					9				12	69	19
30	(United States) Matt McMurry	20	**12**			13	11					68	14
31	(United States) Graham Rahal	9	15								5	64	28
32	(France) Nicolas Lapierre	18	1				16					63	19
33	(Brazil) Bruno Senna	4					**4**					56	9
34	(France) Simon Pagenaud	10	14								13	56	23
35	(Germany) René Rast	17	8				13					55	14
36	(United Kingdom) Alex Brundle	5	5									52	15
37	(Colombia) Gabby Chaves						6				8	48	13
38	(Canada) Devlin DeFrancesco	6									9	47	14
39	(France) Nelson Panciatici		9				8					45	6
40	(France) Olivier Pla	19	16				15					43	14
41	(Mexico) Patricio O'Ward	8	13									41	14
42	(United States) Joel Miller	8					14					40	8
43	(Mexico) Roberto González	12	11									39	14
44	(United States) Nicholas Boulle	12									14	36	14
45	(United Kingdom) Stuart Middleton	2										32	17
46	(Brazil) Lucas di Grassi										2	32	10
47	(France) Loïc Duval	3										30	9
48	(United Kingdom) Marino Franchitti										3	30	7
49	(Italy) Eddie Cheever III	20	**12**									30	14
50	(Switzerland) Hugo de Sadeleer	4										28	9
51	(Portugal) António Félix da Costa (Austria) Ferdinand Habsburg-Lothringen (China) Ho-Pin Tung	5										26	8
52	(United States) Austin Cindric	6										25	8
53	(Germany) Timo Bernhard										**6**	25	8
54	(United States) Gustavo Menezes	7										24	8
55	(Netherlands) Robin Frijns (Spain) Daniel Juncadella (Sweden) Felix Rosenqvist (Canada) Lance Stroll	11										20	8
56	(France) Norman Nato										11	20	6
56	(Mexico) José Gutiérrez										12	19	6
58	(Spain) Fernando Alonso (United Kingdom) Lando Norris	13										18	8
59	(United States) Marc Drumwright (United States) Brendan Gaughan (United States) Eric Lux (Venezuela) Alex Popow	14										17	8
	(United States) Tomy Drissi	WD											
Pos.	Driver	**DAY**	**SEB**	LBH	MOH	BEL	**WGL**	MOS	ELK	LGA	**ATL**	Points	NAEC

Colour	Result
Gold	Winner
Silver	Second place
Bronze	Third place
Green	Points classification
Blue	Non-points classification
Blue	Non-classified finish (NC)
Purple	Retired, not classified (Ret)
Red	Did not qualify (DNQ)
Red	Did not pre-qualify (DNPQ)
Black	Disqualified (DSQ)
White	Did not start (DNS)
White	Withdrew (WD)
White	Race cancelled (C)
Blank	Did not practice (DNP)
Blank	Did not arrive (DNA)
Blank	Excluded (EX)

**Bold** - Pole position
Italics - Fastest lap

==== GT Le Mans ====
Pos.	Driver	**DAY**	**SEB**	LBH	MOH	**WGL**	MOS	LIM	ELK	VIR	LGA	**ATL**	Points	NAEC
1	(Spain) Antonio García (Denmark) Jan Magnussen	**3**	8	4	3	2	2	**2**	3	2	3	8	322	30
2	(Australia) Ryan Briscoe (United Kingdom) Richard Westbrook	1	4	2	5	**6**	1	6	1	**7**	6	5	316	38
3	(United Kingdom) Oliver Gavin (United States) Tommy Milner	4	6	1	8	5	3	4	2	6	**5**	2	310	29
4	(United States) Joey Hand (Germany) Dirk Müller	2	9	**3**	4	1	5	1	7	4	7	7	308	42
5	(New Zealand) Earl Bamber (Belgium) Laurens Vanthoor	6	3	7	1	4	6	3	4	5	2	6	308	27
6	(United States) Connor De Phillippi (United Kingdom) Alexander Sims	9	**2**	8	2	7	7	7	6	1	1	4	304	26
7	(France) Patrick Pilet (United Kingdom) Nick Tandy	8	1	6	6	3	**4**	5	5	8	8	1	299	41
8	(United States) John Edwards (Finland) Jesse Krohn	7	7	5	**7**	8	8	8	8	3	4	**3**	278	26
9	(United States) Bill Auberlen	9	**2**			7						4	106	26
10	(France) Frédéric Makowiecki	8	1									1	93	33
11	(New Zealand) Scott Dixon	1	4									5	89	34
12	(Switzerland) Marcel Fässler	4	6									2	85	25
13	(France) Sébastien Bourdais	2	9									7	78	34
14	(Finland) Toni Vilander	5	5									9	74	25
15	(Italy) Gianmaria Bruni	6	3										55	15
16	(Germany) Mike Rockenfeller	**3**	8										53	17
17	(United Kingdom) James Calado (Italy) Alessandro Pier Guidi	5	5										52	19
18	(Netherlands) Nick Catsburg	7	7										48	14
19	(Australia) Chaz Mostert											**3**	30	8
20	(Italy) Davide Rigon	5											26	9
21	(France) Mathieu Jaminet											6	25	6
22	(Brazil) Augusto Farfus	7											24	8
23	(United Kingdom) Tom Blomqvist					8							23	4
24	(Austria) Philipp Eng	9											22	8
25	(Italy) Andrea Bertolini (Spain) Miguel Molina											9	22	6
Pos.	Driver	**DAY**	**SEB**	LBH	MOH	**WGL**	MOS	LIM	ELK	VIR	LGA	**ATL**	Points	NAEC

==== GT Daytona ====
Pos.	Driver	**DAY**	**SEB**	MOH	BEL	**WGL**	MOS	LIM	ELK	VIR	LGA	**ATL**	Points	NAEC
1	(United States) Bryan Sellers (United States) Madison Snow	3	1	3	**3**	3	4	1	2	6	4	3	333	26
2	(United Kingdom) Katherine Legge	2	8	2	1	2	5	4	7	3	**1**	2	329	29
3	(Netherlands) Jeroen Bleekemolen (United States) Ben Keating	4	3	9	4	5	1	6	5	5	3	8	299	31
4	(United States) Cooper MacNeil	10	2	8	5	7	8	3	3	4	8	**1**	295	20
5	(Austria) Dominik Baumann (Canada) Kyle Marcelli	15	14	1	6	13	2	7	6	1	10	11	268	20
6	(Portugal) Álvaro Parente	2	8	2		2	5	4	7		**1**	2	264	29
7	(United States) Patrick Long (Denmark) Christina Nielsen	19	6	7	11	9	9	**8**	**1**	2	11	4	263	18
8	(United States) Andy Lally (United States) John Potter	6	13	10	10	17	3	2	9	7	5	9	255	18
9	(United States) Lawson Aschenbach (United States) Justin Marks	11	7	5	2	14	6	9	8	9	13	12	249	21
10	(United Kingdom) Jack Hawksworth	9	5	**4**	12	**4**	**7**	5	12	**8**	7	10	239	19
11	(Denmark) David Heinemeier Hansson	9	5	**4**	12	**4**	**7**		12	**8**	7	10	213	19
12	(United States) Gunnar Jeannette	10	2			7		3		4	8	**1**	193	20
13	(Germany) Mario Farnbacher	11	7		1	**4**		5		3		12	182	22
14	(United States) Robby Foley	12			7		11	10	4	10	12		153	8
15	(United States) Bill Auberlen			6	7		11	10	4	10	12		131	8
16	(Germany) Jörg Bergmeister (United States) Patrick Lindsey	18	9			6			11		2		112	18
17	(United States) Townsend Bell (United States) Frankie Montecalvo	5	17			10					9	5	109	18
18	(Australia) Kenny Habul	8	10	12	8	8							109	19
19	(Germany) Luca Stolz	4	3			5						8	107	
20	(Finland) Markus Palttala		11			1						15	100	6
21	(United States) Dillon Machavern		11	6		1							80	6
22	(South Africa) Sheldon van der Linde (Germany) Christopher Mies	7	4			12						6	96	24
23	(United States) Jeff Segal	10			5	7	8						94	
24	(United States) Don Yount	14	11			1							72	21
25	(United States) Trent Hindman	2	8									2	87	21
26	(Germany) Robert Renauer	19	6			9							87	18
27	(Germany) Wolf Henzler			11	9		10					13	81	–
28	(United States) Andrew Davis	6	13			17						9	79	18
29	(Brazil) Daniel Serra	**21**	**12**			18						**1**	77	18
30	(Italy) Alessandro Balzan	10	2	8									76	16
31	(Colombia) J. C. Perez	12	18^{1}			16						7	71	18
32	(Germany) Thomas Jäger (Canada) Mikaël Grenier	8	10			8							67	18
33	(United States) Corey Lewis		1									3	65	9
34	(United States) Michael Schein			11	9		10						63	–
35	(United States) Sean Rayhall	16	5									10	62	14
36	(United States) Bill Sweedler	5	17			10							61	18
37	(United States) Francesco Piovanetti (Brazil) Oswaldo Negri Jr.					18			10		6		59	4
38	(United States) Tim Pappas	15	14									13	53	14
39	(Switzerland) Philipp Frommenwiler	15	14									11	53	16
40	(Italy) Loris Spinelli	12	18^{1}			16							47	18
41	(United States) Ryan Eversley (United States) Chad Gilsinger	16	15			15							47	18
42	(Germany) Maro Engel	8		12									43	8
43	(Canada) Daniel Morad					12						6	40	24
44	(France) Mathieu Jaminet	19	6										37	14
45	(Italy) Mirko Bortolotti (Netherlands) Rik Breukers (Switzerland) Rolf Ineichen (France) Franck Perera	1											35	13
46	(United Kingdom) Till Bechtolsheimer (United States) Marc Miller		16			11							35	6
47	(United States) A. J. Allmendinger	2											32	14
48	(United States) Kenton Koch	12	18^{1}										32	14
49	(United States) Tom Dyer		15			15							32	6
50	(Italy) Andrea Caldarelli (United States) Bryce Miller	3											30	12
48	(Canada) Paul Dalla Lana (Portugal) Pedro Lamy (Austria) Mathias Lauda	**21**	**12**										29	14
49	(United Kingdom) Adam Christodoulou	4											28	13
50	(Belgium) Alessio Picariello		4										28	9
51	(United Kingdom) Sam Bird	5											26	8
52	(Germany) Markus Winkelhock	6											25	8
53	(South Africa) Kelvin van der Linde (Switzerland) Jeffrey Schmidt	7											24	11
54	(Germany) Bernd Schneider				8								23	–
55	(Germany) Dominik Farnbacher (United States) Scott Pruett	9											22	8
56	(France) Côme Ledogar	11											20	9
57	(Germany) Christian Engelhart (Switzerland) Christoph Lenz (Belgium) Louis Machiels (Argentina) Ezequiel Pérez Companc (Netherlands) Max van Splunteren	13											18	8
58	(Germany) Jens Klingmann (United States) Mark Kvamme (United States) Cameron Lawrence (Germany) Martin Tomczyk	14											17	8
59	(Brazil) Bruno Junqueira	15											16	8
60	(United States) John Falb	16											15	8
61	(Canada) Kuno Wittmer		16										15	6
62	(Mexico) Santiago Creel (Mexico) Martin Fuentes (Republic of Ireland) Matt Griffin (Spain) Miguel Molina (Mexico) Ricardo Pérez de Lara	17											14	8
63	(Austria) Norbert Siedler	18											13	8
64	(Italy) Matteo Cairoli (Germany) Sven Müller (Austria) Harald Proczyk (Germany) Steve Smith (Germany) Randy Walls	20											11	8
Pos.	Driver	**DAY**	**SEB**	MOH	BEL	**WGL**	MOS	LIM	ELK	VIR	LGA	**ATL**	Points	NAEC

Notes

- ^{1} – Relegated to last in class for exceeding maximum driver time.

=== Team's Championships ===
==== Prototype ====
Pos.	Team	**DAY**	**SEB**	LBH	MOH	BEL	**WGL**	MOS	ELK	LGA	**ATL**	Points	NAEC
1	#31 Whelen Engineering Racing	2	3	7	8	1	7	3	3	5	8	277	40
2	#54 CORE Autosport	3	4	10	13	12	2	1	1	2	7	274	28
3	#10 Wayne Taylor Racing	**15**	2	3	5	5	5	2	4	**12**	1	270	32
4	#99 JDC-Miller MotorSports	7	7	8	7	11	1	7	2	6	10	252	21
5	#6 Acura Team Penske	10	14	**5**	2	3	3	**10**	5	3	13	251	30
6	#5 Mustang Sampling Racing	1	10	1	4	6	6	4	7	DNS	4	249	31
7	#7 Acura Team Penske	9	15	6	**1**	2	12	5	9	10	5	244	32
8	#77 Mazda Team Joest	17	8	4	3	9	13	6	11	9	2	234	28
9	#22 Tequila Patrón ESM	18	1	12	9	**7**	16	12	6	1	**6**	232	31
10	#55 Mazda Team Joest	16	6	9	14	14	10	11	8	4	3	218	28
11	#85 JDC-Miller MotorSports	6	9	13	12	10	8	8	**12**	7	9	216	24
12	#52 AFS/PR1 Mathiasen Motorsports	12	11	11	6	8	9	9	13	8	12	211	24
13	#2 Tequila Patrón ESM	19	16	2	10	4	15		9	11	11	186	27
14	#38 Performance Tech Motorsports	8	13	14	11		14	DNS			14	112	24
15	#32 United Autosports	4	5				**4**					82	23
16	#90 Spirit of Daytona Racing	20	**12**			13	11					68	18
17	#78 Jackie Chan DCR JOTA	5										26	8
18	#37 Jackie Chan DCR JOTA	11										20	8
19	#23 United Autosports	13										18	8
20	#20 BAR1 Motorsports	14										17	8
Pos.	Team	**DAY**	**SEB**	LBH	MOH	BEL	**WGL**	MOS	ELK	LGA	**ATL**	Points	NAEC

==== GT Le Mans ====
Pos.	Team	**DAY**	**SEB**	LBH	MOH	**WGL**	MOS	LIM	ELK	VIR	LGA	**ATL**	Points	NAEC
1	#3 Corvette Racing	**3**	8	4	3	2	2	**2**	3	2	3	8	322	23
2	#67 Ford Chip Ganassi Racing	1	4	2	5	**6**	1	6	1	**7**	6	5	316	28
3	#4 Corvette Racing	4	6	1	8	5	3	4	2	6	**5**	2	310	21
4	#66 Ford Chip Ganassi Racing	2	9	3	4	1	5	1	**7**	4	7	7	308	33
5	#912 Porsche GT Team	6	3	7	1	4	6	3	4	5	2	6	308	21
6	#25 BMW Team RLL	9	**2**	8	2	7	7	7	6	1	1	4	304	20
7	#911 Porsche GT Team	8	1	6	6	3	**4**	5	5	8	8	1	299	29
8	#24 BMW Team RLL	7	7	5	**7**	8	8	8	8	3	4	**3**	278	18
9	#62 Risi Competizione	5	5									9	74	19
Pos.	Team	**DAY**	**SEB**	LBH	MOH	**WGL**	MOS	LIM	ELK	VIR	LGA	**ATL**	Points	NAEC

==== GT Daytona ====
Pos.	Team	**DAY**	**SEB**	MOH	BEL	**WGL**	MOS	LIM	ELK	VIR	LGA	**ATL**	Points	NAEC
1	#48 Paul Miller Racing	3	1	3	**3**	3	4	1	2	6	4	3	333	26
2	#86 Meyer Shank Racing with Curb-Agajanian	2	8	2	1	2	5	4	7	3	**1**	2	329	29
3	#33 Mercedes-AMG Team Riley Motorsports	4	3	9	4	5	1	6	5	5	3	8	299	31
4	#63 Scuderia Corsa	10	2	8	5	7	8	3	3	4	8	**1**	295	20
5	#14 3GT Racing	15	14	1	6	15	2	7	6	1	10	11	266	20
6	#58 Wright Motorsports	19	6	7	11	9	9	**8**	**1**	2	11	4	263	18
7	#44 Magnus Racing	6	13	10	10	12	3	2	9	7	5	9	259	18
8	#96 Turner Motorsport	14	11	6	7	1	11	10	4	9	12	14	248	21
9	#93 Meyer Shank Racing with Curb-Agajanian	11	7	5	2	16	6	9	8	8	13	12	247	21
10	#15 3GT Racing	9	5	**4**	12	**4**	**7**	5	DNS	**10**	7	10	239	19
11	#73 Park Place Motorsports	18	9			6			11		2	13	130	18
12	#64 Scuderia Corsa	5	17			10					9	5	109	18
13	#75 SunEnergy1 Racing	8	10	12	8	8							109	18
14	#29 Montaplast by Land-Motorsport	7	4			13						6	95	24
15	#51 Squadra Corse Garage Italia	**21**	**12**			14			10		6		92	18
16	#71 P1 Motorsports	12	18^{1}			18						7	69	18
17	#16 Wright Motorsports			11	9		10	DNS					63	–
18	#69 HART	16	15			17							45	18
19	#11 GRT Grasser Racing Team	1											35	13
20	#36 CJ Wilson Racing		16			11							35	10
21	#19 GRT Grasser Racing Team	13											18	8
22	#82 Risi Competizione	17											14	8
23	#59 Manthey Racing	20											11	8
Pos.	Team	**DAY**	**SEB**	MOH	BEL	**WGL**	MOS	LIM	ELK	VIR	LGA	**ATL**	Points	NAEC

Notes

- ^{1} – Relegated to last in class for exceeding maximum driver time.

=== Manufacturers' championships ===
==== Prototype ====
Pos.	Manufacturer	**DAY**	**SEB**	LBH	MOH	BEL	**WGL**	MOS	ELK	LGA	**ATL**	Points	NAEC
1	Cadillac	**1**	**2**	1	4	1	5	2	3	5	1	332	53
2	Acura	9	14	**5**	**1**	2	3	5	5	2	5	316	45
3	Nissan	18	1	2	9	**4**	15	12	6	1	**6**	302	34
4	Mazda	16	6	4	3	9	10	6	9	4	2	300	36
Manufacturers ineligible for championship points
	Gibson	3	4	8	6	8	**1**	**1**	**1**	2	7		
Pos.	Manufacturer	**DAY**	**SEB**	LBH	MOH	BEL	**WGL**	MOS	ELK	LGA	**ATL**	Points	NAEC

==== GT Le Mans ====
Pos.	Manufacturer	**DAY**	**SEB**	LBH	MOH	**WGL**	MOS	LIM	ELK	VIR	LGA	**ATL**	Points	NAEC
1	Ford	1	4	**2**	4	**1**	1	1	**1**	**4**	7	5	351	48
2	Chevrolet	**3**	6	1	3	2	2	**2**	2	2	3	2	345	40
3	Porsche	6	1	6	1	4	**4**	3	4	5	2	1	341	45
4	BMW	7	**2**	5	**2**	7	7	7	6	1	1	**3**	332	28
5	Ferrari	5	5									9	84	21
Pos.	Manufacturer	**DAY**	**SEB**	LBH	MOH	**WGL**	MOS	LIM	ELK	VIR	LGA	**ATL**	Points	NAEC

==== GT Daytona ====
Pos.	Manufacturer	**DAY**	**SEB**	MOH	BEL	**WGL**	MOS	LIM	ELK	VIR	LGA	**ATL**	Points	NAEC
1	Lamborghini	1	1	3	**3**	3	4	1	2	6	4	3	340	40
2	Acura	2	7	2	1	2	5	4	7	3	1	2	330	39
3	Ferrari	**5**	**2**	8	5	7	8	3	3	4	6	**1**	310	30
4	Mercedes-AMG	4	3	9	4	5	1	6	5	5	3	7	307	41
5	Lexus	9	5	**1**	6	**4**	**2**	5	6	**1**	7	10	306	27
6	Porsche	18	6	7	9	6	9	**9**	**1**	2	2	4	298	27
7	Audi	6	4	10	10	12	3	2	9	7	5	6	284	33
8	BMW	14	11	6	7	1	11	10	4	9	10	14	278	27
Pos.	Manufacturer	**DAY**	**SEB**	MOH	BEL	**WGL**	MOS	LIM	ELK	VIR	LGA	**ATL**	Points	NAEC
