= 2018 Continental Tire Road Race Showcase =

Ninth round of the 2018 IMSA SportsCar Championship

Track map of Road America

The 2018 Continental Tire Road Race Showcase sports car race sanctioned by the International Motor Sports Association (IMSA). The Race was held at Road America in Elkhart Lake, Wisconsin on August 5, 2018. The race was the ninth round of the 2018 IMSA SportsCar Championship.

== Background ==
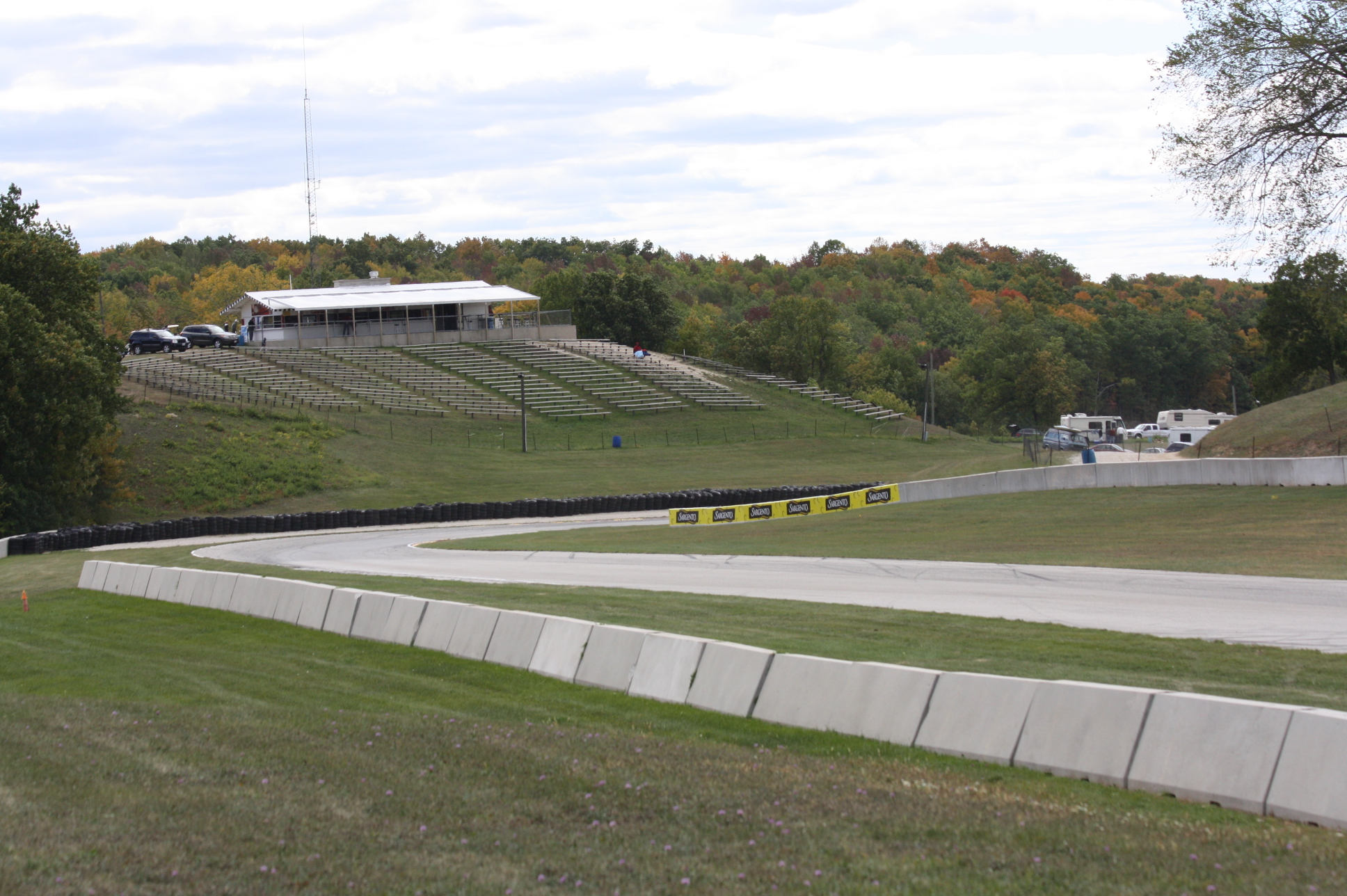
Road America, where the race was held.

International Motor Sports Association's (IMSA) president Scott Atherton confirmed the race was part of the schedule for the 2018 IMSA SportsCar Championship (IMSA SCC) in August 2017. It was the fifth consecutive year the event was held as part of the WeatherTech SportsCar Championship. The 2018 Continental Tire Road Race Showcase was the ninth of twelve scheduled sports car races of 2018 by IMSA, and was the sixth round not held on the held as part of the North American Endurance Cup. The race was held at the fourteen-turn 4.048 mi (6.515 km) Road America on August 5, 2018.

After the Northeast Grand Prix 2 weeks earlier, Eric Curran and Felipe Nasr led the Prototype Drivers' Championship with 198 points, ahead of Filipe Albuquerque with 197 points, and Jordan Taylor and Renger van der Zande with 188 points. With 208 points, the GTLM Drivers' Championship was led by Joey Hand and Dirk Müller with a one-point advantage over Antonio García and Jan Magnussen. In GTD, the Drivers' Championship was led by Bryan Sellers and Madison Snow with 218 points ahead of Katherine Legge with 208 points. Cadillac, Ford, and Lamborghini were leading were leading their respective Manufacturers' Championships, while Whelen Engineering Racing, Ford Chip Ganassi Racing, and Paul Miller Racing each led their own Teams' Championships.

During this race weekend, IMSA holds their "State of the Series" annual press conference, in which they confirm and announce their future plans for the series they sanction.

After having Daytona Prototype International and Le Mans Prototype 2 competing in the Prototype class for 2 seasons, IMSA announced the two styles of prototypes would split into two separate classes.

IMSA also announced the WeatherTech Sprint Cup for GTD beginning in 2019. Additionally, any bronze/silver rated driver had to qualify and start races.

On July 26, 2018, IMSA released the latest technical bulletin outlining Balance of performance for the event. In P, the Cadillac DPi-V.R gained a 0.9 mm larger air restrictor while the Mazda RT24-P and Nissan Onroak DPi got an increase of turbo boost. Additionally, the Mazda also received a 10 kilogram weight reduction.

== Entries ==
A total of 33 cars took part in the event split across three classes. 13 cars were entered in P, 8 in GTLM, and 12 in GTD. In P, João Barbosa returned to the #5 Mustang Sampling Racing after missing the previous two rounds due to injury. Tequila Patrón ESM brought its #2 entry back after it skipped the Canadian Tire Motorsport Park round. Performance Tech Motorsports skipped the event. In GTD, Squadra Corse Garage Italia and Park Place Motorsports made their first appearances since the Watkins Glen round. Wright Motorsports withdrew its #16 entry after Michael Schein had a scheduling conflict. Markus Palttala joined Robby Foley in the Turner Motorsport entry. Alessandro Pier Guidi joined Cooper MacNeil in the #63 Scuderia Corsa entry. David Heinemeier Hansson returned to the #15 3GT Racing entry.

== Practice ==
There were three practice sessions preceding the start of the race on Sunday, two on Friday and one on Saturday. The first two one-hour sessions were on Friday morning and afternoon. The third on Saturday morning lasted an hour.

=== Practice 1 ===
The first practice session took place at 11:15 am CT on Friday and ended with Oliver Jarvis topping the timing sheets for Mazda Team Joest, with a lap time of 1:52.627.

Pos.	Class	No.	Team	Driver	Time	Gap
1	P	77	Mazda Team Joest	Oliver Jarvis	1:52.627	_
2	P	2	Tequila Patrón ESM	Scott Sharp	1:52.816	+0.189
3	P	85	JDC-Miller MotorSports	Stephen Simpson	1:52.957	+0.330

=== Practice 2 ===
The second practice session took place at 4:10 pm CT on Friday and ended with Jordan Taylor topping the timing sheets for Wayne Taylor Racing, with a lap time of 1:52.402.

Pos.	Class	No.	Team	Driver	Time	Gap
1	P	10	Wayne Taylor Racing	Jordan Taylor	1:52.402	_
2	P	6	Acura Team Penske	Juan Pablo Montoya	1:52.755	+0.353
3	P	85	JDC-Miller MotorSports	Robert Alon	1:52.773	+0.371

=== Practice 3 ===
The third and final practice session took place at 8:55 am CT on Saturday and ended with Simon Trummer topping the timing sheets for JDC-Miller MotorSports, with a lap time of 1:51.644.

Pos.	Class	No.	Team	Driver	Time	Gap
1	P	85	JDC-Miller MotorSports	Simon Trummer	1:51.644	_
2	P	2	Tequila Patrón ESM	Ryan Dalziel	1:52.399	+0.755
3	P	77	Mazda Team Joest	Oliver Jarvis	1:52.470	+0.826

== Qualifying ==
Saturday afternoon's 65-minute qualifying session was divided into three groups. All three categories had 15-minute individual sessions, and regulations stipulated teams to nominate a single driver to qualify their cars. The competitors' fastest lap times determined the starting order with the grid arranged to put the Prototype and GTLM cars ahead of all GTD entries.

=== Qualifying results ===
Pole positions in each class are indicated in bold and by ‡.

Pos.	Class	No.	Team	Driver	Time	Gap	Grid
1	**P**	**85**	**(United States) JDC-Miller MotorSports**	**(United States) Robert Alon**	**1:51.933**	**_**	1‡
2	P	7	(United States) Acura Team Penske	(United States) Ricky Taylor	1:52.140	+0.207	2
3	P	54	(United States) CORE Autosport	(United States) Colin Braun	1:52.340	+0.407	13^{1}
4	P	10	(United States) Wayne Taylor Racing	(Netherlands) Renger van der Zande	1:52.430	+0.497	3
5	P	6	(United States) Acura Team Penske	(Colombia) Juan Pablo Montoya	1:52.780	+0.847	4
6	P	77	(Germany) Mazda Team Joest	(United Kingdom) Oliver Jarvis	1:52.813	+0.880	5
7	P	5	(United States) Mustang Sampling Racing	(Portugal) João Barbosa	1:52.867	+0.934	6
8	P	55	(Germany) Mazda Team Joest	(United Kingdom) Harry Tincknell	1:53.161	+1.228	7
9	P	31	(United States) Whelen Engineering Racing	(United States) Eric Curran	1:53.257	+1.324	8
10	P	99	(United States) JDC-Miller MotorSports	(Canada) Misha Goikhberg	1:53.435	+1.502	9
11	P	52	(United States) AFS/PR1 Mathiasen Motorsports	(Colombia) Gustavo Yacamán	1:53.545	+1.612	10
12	P	2	(United States) Tequila Patrón ESM	(United States) Scott Sharp	1:53.626	+1.693	11
13	P	22	(United States) Tequila Patrón ESM	(United States) Johannes van Overbeek	1:54.092	+2.159	12
14	**GTLM**	**66**	**(United States) Ford Chip Ganassi Racing**	**(Germany) Dirk Müller**	**2:02.479**	**+10.546**	14‡
15	GTLM	67	(United States) Ford Chip Ganassi Racing	(Australia) Ryan Briscoe	2:02.650	+10.717	15
16	GTLM	3	(United States) Corvette Racing	(Spain) Antonio García	2:02.746	+10.813	16
17	GTLM	912	(United States) Porsche GT Team	(Belgium) Laurens Vanthoor	2:03.114	+11.181	17
18	GTLM	4	(United States) Corvette Racing	(United Kingdom) Oliver Gavin	2:03.170	+11.237	18
19	GTLM	24	(United States) BMW Team RLL	(Finland) Jesse Krohn	2:03.331	+11.398	19
20	GTLM	25	(United States) BMW Team RLL	(United Kingdom) Alexander Sims	2:03.645	+11.712	20
21	GTLM	911	(United States) Porsche GT Team	(United Kingdom) Nick Tandy	2:03.673	+11.740	21
22	**GTD**	**58**	**(United States) Wright Motorsports**	**(United States) Patrick Long**	**2:06.593**	**+14.660**	22‡
23	GTD	14	(United States) 3GT Racing	(Austria) Dominik Baumann	2:06.850	+14.917	23
24	GTD	48	(United States) Paul Miller Racing	(United States) Madison Snow	2:07.226	+15.293	24
25	GTD	63	(United States) Scuderia Corsa	(United States) Cooper MacNeil	2:07.317	+15.384	25
26	GTD	33	(United States) Mercedes-AMG Team Riley Motorsport	(United States) Ben Keating	2:07.561	+15.628	26
27	GTD	73	(United States) Park Place Motorsports	(United States) Patrick Lindsey	2:07.944	+16.011	27
28	GTD	86	(United States) Meyer Shank Racing with Curb-Agajanin	(United Kingdom) Katherine Legge	2:08.220	+16.347	28
29	GTD	96	(United States) Turner Motorsport	(United States) Robby Foley	2:08.402	+16.469	29
30	GTD	44	(United States) Magnus Racing	(United States) John Potter	2:08.947	+17.014	30
31	GTD	93	(United States) Meyer Shank Racing with Curb-Agajanin	(United States) Justin Marks	2:12.272	+20.339	31
32	GTD	15	(United States) 3GT Racing	did not participate			32^{2}
33	GTD	51	(Italy) Squadra Corse Garage Italia	did not participate			33^{3}
Sources:

- ^{1} The No. 54 CORE Autosport entry was moved to the back of the P field as per Article 43.5 of the Sporting regulations (Change of starting driver).
- ^{2} The No. 15 3GT Racing entry was moved to the back of the GTD field as per Article 43.5 of the Sporting regulations (Change of starting driver).
- ^{3} The No. 51 Squadra Corse Garage Italia entry was moved to the back of the GTD field as per Article 43.6 of the Sporting regulations (Change of starting tires).

== Warm Up ==
A 20-minute morning warm-up session was held on the morning of August 5, and several entries did not get a time in due to Jack Hawksworth crashing at turn 8 after brake failure which brought a red flag that ended the session. The #22 Nissan Onroak DPi of Pipo Derani lapped fastest at 1:53.080 ahead of Ricky Taylor in the #7 Acura. The fastest GTLM lap was a 2:04.597, set by Antonio García in the #3 Corvette, and Jörg Bergmeister's #73 Porsche paced GTD. 3GT Racing withdrew its #15 entry from the event after sustaining too much damage in warm up.

== Race ==
=== Post-race ===
As a result of winning the race, Bennett and Braun moved from fourth to third in the Prototype Drivers' Championship. Goikhberg and Simpson advanced from seventh to fifth. As a result of winning the race, Briscoe and Westbrook took the lead of the GTLM Drivers' Championship. Hand and Müller dropped from first to third while Gavin and Milner jumped from fifth to fourth. The result kept Sellers and Snow atop the GTD Drivers' Championship with 250 points, 18 points ahead of Legge. Cadillac, Ford, and Lamborghini continued to top their respective Manufacturers' Championships while Whelen Engineering Racing, and Paul Miller Racing kept their respective advantages in the Teams' Championships. The #67 Ford Chip Ganassi Racing entry took the lead of the GTLM Teams' Championship with three rounds remaining.

=== Results ===
Class winners are denoted in bold and ‡.

Final race classification
Pos	Class	No.	Team	Drivers	Chassis	Tire	Laps	Time/Retired
Pos	Class	No.	Team	Drivers	Engine	Tire	Laps	Time/Retired
1	**P**	**54**	**(United States) CORE Autosport**	**(United States) Jon Bennett (United States) Colin Braun**	**Oreca 07**	C	**69**	**2:40.44.562‡**
1	**P**	**54**	**(United States) CORE Autosport**	**(United States) Jon Bennett (United States) Colin Braun**	**Gibson GK428 4.2 L V8**	C	**69**	**2:40.44.562‡**
2	P	99	(United States) JDC-Miller MotorSports	(Canada) Misha Goikhberg (South Africa) Stephen Simpson	Oreca 07	C	69	+2.389
2	P	99	(United States) JDC-Miller MotorSports	(Canada) Misha Goikhberg (South Africa) Stephen Simpson	Gibson GK428 4.2 L V8	C	69	+2.389
3	P	31	(United States) Whelen Engineering Racing	(Brazil) Felipe Nasr (United States) Eric Curran	Cadillac DPi-V.R	C	69	+2.397
3	P	31	(United States) Whelen Engineering Racing	(Brazil) Felipe Nasr (United States) Eric Curran	Gibson GK428 4.2 L V8	C	69	+2.397
4	P	10	(United States) Wayne Taylor Racing	(United States) Jordan Taylor (Netherlands) Renger van der Zande	Cadillac DPi-V.R	C	69	+10.573
4	P	10	(United States) Wayne Taylor Racing	(United States) Jordan Taylor (Netherlands) Renger van der Zande	Cadillac 5.5 L V8	C	69	+10.573
5	P	6	(United States) Acura Team Penske	(United States) Dane Cameron (Colombia) Juan Pablo Montoya	Acura ARX-05	C	69	+17.056
5	P	6	(United States) Acura Team Penske	(United States) Dane Cameron (Colombia) Juan Pablo Montoya	Acura AR35TT 3.5 L Turbo V6	C	69	+17.056
6	P	22	(United States) Tequila Patrón ESM	(Brazil) Pipo Derani (United States) Johannes van Overbeek	Nissan Onroak DPi	C	69	+21.512
6	P	22	(United States) Tequila Patrón ESM	(Brazil) Pipo Derani (United States) Johannes van Overbeek	Nissan VR38DETT 3.8 L Turbo V6	C	69	+21.512
7	P	5	(United States) Mustang Sampling Racing	(Portugal) Filipe Albuquerque (Portugal) João Barbosa	Cadillac DPi-V.R	C	69	+23.862
7	P	5	(United States) Mustang Sampling Racing	(Portugal) Filipe Albuquerque (Portugal) João Barbosa	Cadillac 5.5 L V8	C	69	+23.862
8	P	55	(Germany) Mazda Team Joest	(United States) Jonathan Bomarito (United Kingdom) Harry Tincknell	Mazda RT24-P	C	69	+32.276
8	P	55	(Germany) Mazda Team Joest	(United States) Jonathan Bomarito (United Kingdom) Harry Tincknell	Mazda MZ-2.0T 2.0L Turbo I4	C	69	+32.276
9	P	2	(United States) Tequila Patrón ESM	(United Kingdom) Ryan Dalziel (United States) Scott Sharp	Nissan Onroak DPi	C	69	+33.229
9	P	2	(United States) Tequila Patrón ESM	(United Kingdom) Ryan Dalziel (United States) Scott Sharp	Nissan VR38DETT 3.8 L Turbo V6	C	69	+33.229
10	P	7	(United States) Acura Team Penske	(Brazil) Hélio Castroneves (United States) Ricky Taylor	Acura ARX-05	C	69	+33.983
10	P	7	(United States) Acura Team Penske	(Brazil) Hélio Castroneves (United States) Ricky Taylor	Acura AR35TT 3.5 L Turbo V6	C	69	+33.983
11	P	77	(Germany) Mazda Team Joest	(United Kingdom) Oliver Jarvis (United States) Tristan Nunez	Mazda RT24-P	C	69	+34.619
11	P	77	(Germany) Mazda Team Joest	(United Kingdom) Oliver Jarvis (United States) Tristan Nunez	Mazda MZ-2.0T 2.0L Turbo I4	C	69	+34.619
12	P	85	(United States) JDC-Miller MotorSports	(United States) Robert Alon (Switzerland) Simon Trummer	Oreca 07	C	68	+1 lap
12	P	85	(United States) JDC-Miller MotorSports	(United States) Robert Alon (Switzerland) Simon Trummer	Gibson GK428 4.2 L V8	C	68	+1 lap
13	**GTLM**	**67**	**(United States) Ford Chip Ganassi Racing**	**(Australia) Ryan Briscoe (United Kingdom) Richard Westbrook**	**Ford GT**	MI	**66**	**+3 Laps‡**
13	**GTLM**	**67**	**(United States) Ford Chip Ganassi Racing**	**(Australia) Ryan Briscoe (United Kingdom) Richard Westbrook**	**Ford EcoBoost 3.5 L Turbo V6**	MI	**66**	**+3 Laps‡**
14	GTLM	4	(United States) Corvette Racing	(United Kingdom) Oliver Gavin (United States) Tommy Milner	Chevrolet Corvette C7.R	MI	66	+3 Laps
14	GTLM	4	(United States) Corvette Racing	(United Kingdom) Oliver Gavin (United States) Tommy Milner	Chevrolet LT5.5 5.5 L V8	MI	66	+3 Laps
15	GTLM	3	(United States) Corvette Racing	(Spain) Antonio García (Denmark) Jan Magnussen	Chevrolet Corvette C7.R	MI	66	+3 Laps
15	GTLM	3	(United States) Corvette Racing	(Spain) Antonio García (Denmark) Jan Magnussen	Chevrolet LT5.5 5.5 L V8	MI	66	+3 Laps
16	GTLM	912	(United States) Porsche GT Team	(New Zealand) Earl Bamber (Belgium) Laurens Vanthoor	Porsche 911 RSR	MI	66	+3 Laps
16	GTLM	912	(United States) Porsche GT Team	(New Zealand) Earl Bamber (Belgium) Laurens Vanthoor	Porsche 4.0 L Flat-6	MI	66	+3 Laps
17	GTLM	911	(United States) Porsche GT Team	(France) Patrick Pilet (United Kingdom) Nick Tandy	Porsche 911 RSR	MI	66	+3 Laps
17	GTLM	911	(United States) Porsche GT Team	(France) Patrick Pilet (United Kingdom) Nick Tandy	Porsche 4.0 L Flat-6	MI	66	+3 Laps
18	**GTD**	**58**	**(United States) Wright Motorsports**	**(United States) Patrick Long (Denmark) Christina Nielsen**	**Porsche 911 GT3 R**	C	**66**	**+3 Laps‡**
18	**GTD**	**58**	**(United States) Wright Motorsports**	**(United States) Patrick Long (Denmark) Christina Nielsen**	**Porsche 4.0 L Flat-6**	C	**66**	**+3 Laps‡**
19	GTD	48	(United States) Paul Miller Racing	(United States) Bryan Sellers (United States) Madison Snow	Lamborghini Huracán GT3	C	66	+3 Laps
19	GTD	48	(United States) Paul Miller Racing	(United States) Bryan Sellers (United States) Madison Snow	Lamborghini 5.2 L V10	C	66	+3 Laps
20	GTD	63	(United States) Scuderia Corsa	(Italy) Alessandro Pier Guidi (United States) Cooper MacNeil	Ferrari 488 GT3	C	66	+3 Laps
20	GTD	63	(United States) Scuderia Corsa	(Italy) Alessandro Pier Guidi (United States) Cooper MacNeil	Ferrari F154CB 3.9 L Turbo V8	C	66	+3 Laps
21	GTD	96	(United States) Turner Motorsport	(United States) Robby Foley (Finland) Markus Palttala	BMW M6 GT3	C	66	+3 Laps
21	GTD	96	(United States) Turner Motorsport	(United States) Robby Foley (Finland) Markus Palttala	BMW 4.4 L Turbo V8	C	66	+3 Laps
22	GTD	33	(United States) Mercedes-AMG Team Riley Motorsport	(Netherlands) Jeroen Bleekemolen (United States) Ben Keating	Mercedes AMG GT3	C	66	+3 Laps
22	GTD	33	(United States) Mercedes-AMG Team Riley Motorsport	(Netherlands) Jeroen Bleekemolen (United States) Ben Keating	Mercedes-AMG M159 6.2 L V8	C	66	+3 Laps
23	GTD	14	(United States) 3GT Racing	(Austria) Dominik Baumann (Canada) Kyle Marcelli	Lexus RC F GT3	C	66	+3 Laps
23	GTD	14	(United States) 3GT Racing	(Austria) Dominik Baumann (Canada) Kyle Marcelli	Lexus 5.0L V8	C	66	+3 Laps
24	GTD	86	(United States) Meyer Shank Racing with Curb-Agajanin	(United Kingdom) Katherine Legge (Portugal) Álvaro Parente	Acura NSX GT3	C	66	+3 Laps
24	GTD	86	(United States) Meyer Shank Racing with Curb-Agajanin	(United Kingdom) Katherine Legge (Portugal) Álvaro Parente	Acura 3.5 L Turbo V6	C	66	+3 Laps
25	GTD	93	(United States) Meyer Shank Racing with Curb-Agajanin	(United States) Justin Marks (United States) Lawson Aschenbach	Acura NSX GT3	C	66	+3 Laps
25	GTD	93	(United States) Meyer Shank Racing with Curb-Agajanin	(United States) Justin Marks (United States) Lawson Aschenbach	Acura 3.5 L Turbo V6	C	66	+3 Laps
26 DNF	GTD	44	(United States) Magnus Racing	(United States) John Potter (United States) Andy Lally	Audi R8 LMS GT3	C	65	Crash
26 DNF	GTD	44	(United States) Magnus Racing	(United States) John Potter (United States) Andy Lally	Audi 5.2L V10	C	65	Crash
27 DNF	GTLM	25	(United States) BMW Team RLL	(United States) Connor De Phillippi (United Kingdom) Alexander Sims	BMW M8 GTE	MI	64	Out of Fuel
27 DNF	GTLM	25	(United States) BMW Team RLL	(United States) Connor De Phillippi (United Kingdom) Alexander Sims	BMW S63 4.0 L Turbo V8	MI	64	Out of Fuel
28	GTLM	66	(United States) Ford Chip Ganassi Racing	(United States) Joey Hand (Germany) Dirk Müller	Ford GT	MI	63	+6 Laps
28	GTLM	66	(United States) Ford Chip Ganassi Racing	(United States) Joey Hand (Germany) Dirk Müller	Ford EcoBoost 3.5 L Turbo V6	MI	63	+6 Laps
29	GTD	51	(Italy) Squadra Corse Garage Italia	(United States) Francesco Piovanetti (Brazil) Oswaldo Negri Jr.	Ferrari 488 GT3	C	63	+6 Laps
29	GTD	51	(Italy) Squadra Corse Garage Italia	(United States) Francesco Piovanetti (Brazil) Oswaldo Negri Jr.	Ferrari F154CB 3.9 L Turbo V8	C	63	+6 Laps
30 DNF	GTLM	24	(United States) BMW Team RLL	(United States) John Edwards (Finland) Jesse Krohn	BMW M8 GTE	MI	52	Mechanical
30 DNF	GTLM	24	(United States) BMW Team RLL	(United States) John Edwards (Finland) Jesse Krohn	BMW S63 4.0 L Turbo V8	MI	52	Mechanical
31 DNF	P	52	(United States) AFS/PR1 Mathiasen Motorsports	(Colombia) Sebastián Saavedra (Colombia) Gustavo Yacamán	Ligier JS P217	C	47	Crash
31 DNF	P	52	(United States) AFS/PR1 Mathiasen Motorsports	(Colombia) Sebastián Saavedra (Colombia) Gustavo Yacamán	Gibson GK428 4.2 L V8	C	47	Crash
32 DNF	GTD	73	(United States) Park Place Motorsports	(Germany) Jörg Bergmeister (United States) Patrick Lindsey	Porsche 911 GT3 R	C	39	Crash
32 DNF	GTD	73	(United States) Park Place Motorsports	(Germany) Jörg Bergmeister (United States) Patrick Lindsey	Porsche 4.0 L Flat-6	C	39	Crash
33 DNS	GTD	15	(United States) 3GT Racing	(United Kingdom) Jack Hawksworth (Denmark) David Heinemeier Hansson	Lexus RC F GT3	C	--	Did Not Start
33 DNS	GTD	15	(United States) 3GT Racing	(United Kingdom) Jack Hawksworth (Denmark) David Heinemeier Hansson	Lexus 5.0L V8	C	--	Did Not Start

Tyre manufacturers
Key
Symbol	Tyre manufacturer
**C**	Continental
**MI**	Michelin

== Standings after the race ==
Prototype Drivers' Championship standings
Pos.	+/–	Driver	Points
1		(United States) Eric Curran (Brazil) Felipe Nasr	228
2		(Portugal) Filipe Albuquerque	221
3	1	(United States) Jon Bennett (United States) Colin Braun	218
4	1	(United States) Jordan Taylor (Netherlands) Renger van der Zande	216
5	2	(Canada) Misha Goikhberg (South Africa) Stephen Simpson	206

GTLM Drivers' Championship standings
Pos.	+/–	Driver	Points
1	2	(Australia) Ryan Briscoe (United Kingdom) Richard Westbrook	241
2		(Spain) Antonio García (Denmark) Jan Magnussen	237
3	2	(United States) Joey Hand (Germany) Dirk Müller	232
4	1	(United Kingdom) Oliver Gavin (United States) Tommy Milner	227
5	1	(New Zealand) Earl Bamber (Belgium) Laurens Vanthoor	225

GTD Drivers' Championship standings
Pos.	+/–	Driver	Points
1		(United States) Bryan Sellers (United States) Madison Snow	250
2		(United Kingdom) Katherine Legge	232
3		(Netherlands) Jeroen Bleekemolen (United States) Ben Keating	220
4		(United States) Cooper MacNeil	209
5		(Portugal) Álvaro Parente	197

- Note: Only the top five positions are included for all sets of standings.

Prototype Teams' Championship standings
Pos.	+/–	Team	Points
1		(United States) No. 31 Whelen Engineering Racing	228
2		(United States) No. 5 Mustang Sampling Racing	221
3	1	(United States) No. 54 CORE Autosport	218
4	1	(United States) No. 10 Wayne Taylor Racing	216
5	2	(United States) No. 99 JDC-Miller Motorsports	206

GTLM Teams' Championship standings
Pos.	+/–	Team	Points
1	1	(United States) No. 67 Ford Chip Ganassi Racing	241
2		(United States) No. 3 Corvette Racing	237
3	2	(United States) No. 66 Ford Chip Ganassi Racing	232
4	1	(United States) No. 4 Corvette Racing	227
5	1	(United States) No. 912 Porsche GT Team	225

GTD Teams' Championship standings
Pos.	+/–	Team	Points
1		(United States) No. 48 Paul Miller Racing	250
2		(United States) No. 86 Meyer Shank Racing with Curb-Agajanin	232
3		(United States) No. 33 Mercedes-AMG Team Riley Motorsports	220
4		(United States) No. 63 Scuderia Corsa	209
5	1	(United States) No. 14 3GT Racing	192

- Note: Only the top five positions are included for all sets of standings.

Prototype Manufacturers' Championship standings
Pos.	+/–	Manufacturer	Points
1		(United States) Cadillac	269
2		(United States) Acura	254
3	1	(Japan) Nissan	239
4	1	(Japan) Mazda	238

GTLM Manufacturers' Championship standings
Pos.	+/–	Manufacturer	Points
1		(United States) Ford	265
2		(United States) Chevrolet	251
3		(Germany) Porsche	246
4		(Germany) BMW	232
5		(Italy) Ferrari	58

GTD Manufacturers' Championship standings
Pos.	+/–	Manufacturer	Points
1		(Italy) Lamborghini	257
2		(United States) Acura	233
3		(Germany) Mercedes-AMG	226
4		(Japan) Lexus	223
5		(Italy) Ferrari	222

- Note: Only the top five positions are included for all sets of standings.

IMSA SportsCar Championship
Previous race: Northeast Grand Prix	2018 season	Next race: Oak Tree Grand Prix
