= 2018 Monterey Grand Prix =

Sports car race

Track map of WeatherTech Raceway Laguna Seca

The 2018 Monterey Grand Prix was a sports car race sanctioned by the International Motor Sports Association (IMSA). The race was held at WeatherTech Raceway Laguna Seca in Monterey County, California, on held on September 9, 2018, at WeatherTech Raceway Laguna Seca in Monterey, California, United States. The race was eleventh the round of the 2018 IMSA SportsCar Championship.

== Background ==
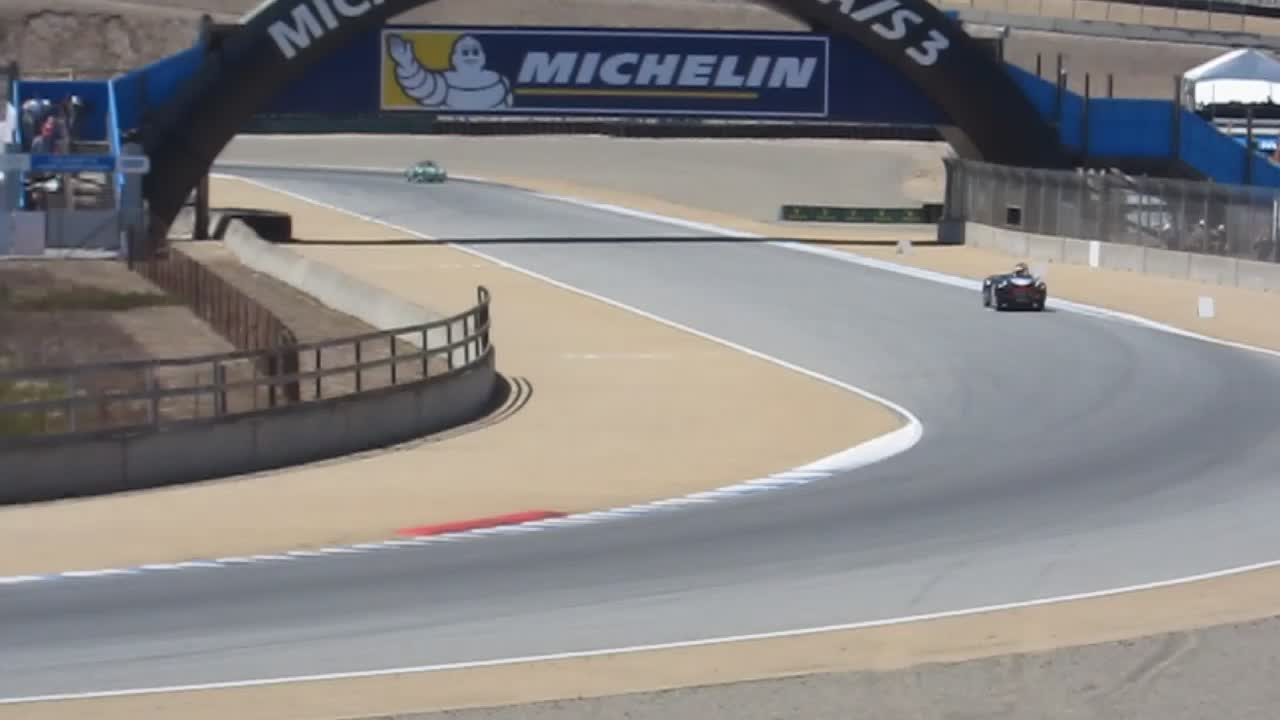
WeatherTech Raceway Laguna Seca, where the race was held.

International Motor Sports Association's (IMSA) president Scott Atherton confirmed the race was part of the schedule for the 2018 IMSA SportsCar Championship (IMSA SCC) in August 2017. It was the fifth consecutive year the event was held as part of the WeatherTech SportsCar Championship. The 2018 Monterey Grand Prix was the eleventh of twelve scheduled sports car races of 2018 by IMSA, and was the eighth round not held on the held as part of the North American Endurance Cup. The race was held at the eleven-turn 2.238 mi (3.602 km) WeatherTech Raceway Laguna Seca on September 9, 2018.

After the Oak Tree Grand Prix three weeks earlier, Eric Curran and Felipe Nasr led the Prototype Drivers' Championship with 228 points, ahead of Filipe Albuquerque with 221 points, and Jon Bennett and Colin Braun with 218 points. With 269 points, the GTLM Drivers' Championship was led by Antonio García and Jan Magnussen with a four-point advantage over Ryan Briscoe and Richard Westbrook. In GTD, the Drivers' Championship was led by Bryan Sellers and Madison Snow with a thirteen-point advantage over Katherine Legge with 262 points. Cadillac, Ford, and Lamborghini were leading their respective Manufacturers' Championships, while Whelen Engineering Racing, Corvette Racing, and Paul Miller Racing each led their own Teams' Championships.

IMSA released two separate technical bulletins regarding the Balance of Performance for the event. The first one was released on August 30, 2018, for the Prototype (P) class. The Oreca 07, Ligier JS P217, Dallara P217, and Riley-Multimatic MkXXX were given a 10 kilogram weight increase and a fuel capacity reduction of 3 liters. The Mazda RT24-P was given a 10 kilogram weight reduction and a fuel capacity increase of 2 liters. The Acura ARX-05, Cadillac DPi-V.R, and Nissan Onroak DPi were also given a fuel capacity increase of 2 liters. The second technical bulletin was released on September 5, 2018, which regarded the Balance of Performance in the GT Le Mans (GTLM) and GT Daytona (GTD) classes for the event. In GTD, The Ferrari 488 GT3 received an increase in turbo boost as well as a fuel capacity increase of 2 liters. No changes were made in GTLM.

== Entries ==
A total of 34 cars took part in the event. 13 cars were entered in P, 8 in GTLM, and 13 in GTD. In P, AFS/PR1 Mathiasen Motorsports switched from the Ligier JS P217 to the Oreca 07. In GTD, Park Place Motorsports and Squadra Corse Garage Italia returned after skipping the Virginia International Raceway event. Scuderia Corsa added a second entry. SunEnergy1 Racing withdrew from the event due to Kenny Habul having an illness.

== Practice ==
There were three practice sessions preceding the start of the race on Sunday, two on Friday and one on Saturday. The first two one-hour sessions were on Friday morning and afternoon. The third on Saturday morning lasted an hour.

=== Practice 1 ===
The first practice session took place at 10:55 am PT on Friday and ended with Renger van der Zande topping the charts for Wayne Taylor Racing, with a lap time of 1:16.832.

Pos.	Class	No.	Team	Driver	Time	Gap
1	P	10	Wayne Taylor Racing	Renger van der Zande	1:16.832	_
2	P	6	Acura Team Penske	Dane Cameron	1:17.533	+0.651
3	P	22	Tequila Patrón ESM	Pipo Derani	1:17.975	+1.093

=== Practice 2 ===
The second practice session took place at 3:15 pm PT on Friday and ended with Dane Cameron topping the charts for Acura Team Penske, with a lap time of 1:16.865.

Pos.	Class	No.	Team	Driver	Time	Gap
1	P	6	Acura Team Penske	Dane Cameron	1:16.865	_
2	P	7	Acura Team Penske	Hélio Castroneves	1:16.980	+0.115
3	P	5	Mustang Sampling Racing	Filipe Albuquerque	1:17.248	+0.383

=== Practice 3 ===
The third and final practice session took place at 8:30 am PT on Saturday and ended with Renger van der Zande topping the charts for Wayne Taylor Racing, with a lap time of 1:16.605.

Pos.	Class	No.	Team	Driver	Time	Gap
1	P	10	Wayne Taylor Racing	Renger van der Zande	1:16.605	_
2	P	77	Mazda Team Joest	Oliver Jarvis	1:16.686	+0.081
3	P	7	Acura Team Penske	Hélio Castroneves	1:16.750	+0.145

== Qualifying ==
Saturday afternoon's 65-minute qualifying session was divided into three groups. All three categories had 15-minute individual sessions, and regulations stipulated teams to nominate a single driver to qualify their cars. The competitors' fastest lap times determined the starting order with the grid arranged to put the Prototype and GTLM cars ahead of all GTD entries.

=== Qualifying results ===
Pole positions in each class are indicated in bold and by ‡.

Pos.	Class	No.	Team	Driver	Time	Gap	Grid
1	**P**	10	**(United States) Wayne Taylor Racing**	**(Netherlands) Renger van der Zande**	**1:16.181**	**_**	1‡
2	P	6	(United States) Acura Team Penske	(United States) Dane Cameron	1:16.576	+0.395	2
3	P	7	(United States) Acura Team Penske	(Brazil) Hélio Castroneves	1:16.662	+0.481	3
4	P	22	(United States) Tequila Patrón ESM	(Brazil) Pipo Derani	1:16.766	+0.585	13^{1}
5	P	54	(United States) CORE Autosport	(United States) Colin Braun	1:16.774	+0.593	12^{2}
6	P	55	(Germany) Mazda Team Joest	(United States) Jonathan Bomarito	1:16.793	+0.612	4
7	P	85	(United States) JDC-Miller MotorSports	(United States) Robert Alon	1:16.989	+0.808	5
8	P	77	(Germany) Mazda Team Joest	(United Kingdom) Oliver Jarvis	1:17.249	+1.068	6
9	P	31	(United States) Whelen Engineering Racing	(United States) Eric Curran	1:17.415	+1.234	7
10	P	52	(United States) AFS/PR1 Mathiasen Motorsports	(Colombia) Sebastián Saavedra	1:17.485	+1.304	8
11	P	5	(United States) Mustang Sampling Racing	(Portugal) João Barbosa	1:17.525	+1.344	9
12	P	2	(United States) Tequila Patrón ESM	(United States) Scott Sharp	1:17.679	+1.498	10
13	P	99	(United States) JDC-Miller MotorSports	(Canada) Misha Goikhberg	1:18.067	+1.886	11
14	**GTLM**	**4**	**(United States) Corvette Racing**	**(United Kingdom) Oliver Gavin**	**1:22.700**	**+6.519**	14‡
15	GTLM	66	(United States) Ford Chip Ganassi Racing	(Germany) Dirk Müller	1:22.787	+6.606	15
16	GTLM	3	(United States) Corvette Racing	(Denmark) Jan Magnussen	1:22.806	+6.625	16
17	GTLM	67	(United States) Ford Chip Ganassi Racing	(Australia) Ryan Briscoe	1:22.850	+6.669	17
18	GTLM	25	(United States) BMW Team RLL	(United Kingdom) Alexander Sims	1:22.972	+6.791	18
19	GTLM	911	(United States) Porsche GT Team	(United Kingdom) Nick Tandy	1:22.990	+6.809	19
20	GTLM	912	(United States) Porsche GT Team	(New Zealand) Earl Bamber	1:23.140	+6.959	20
21	GTLM	24	(United States) BMW Team RLL	(Finland) Jesse Krohn	1:23.527	+7.346	21
22	**GTD**	**86**	**(United States) Meyer Shank Racing with Curb-Agajanin**	**(United Kingdom) Katherine Legge**	**1:24.456**	**+8.275**	22‡
23	GTD	48	(United States) Paul Miller Racing	(United States) Madison Snow	1:24.595	+8.414	23
24	GTD	33	(United States) Mercedes-AMG Team Riley Motorsport	(Netherlands) Jeroen Bleekemolen	1:24.644	+8.463	24
25	GTD	58	(United States) Wright Motorsports	(United States) Patrick Long	1:24.871	+8.690	25
26	GTD	73	(United States) Park Place Motorsports	(United States) Patrick Lindsey	1:24.904	+8.723	26
27	GTD	14	(United States) 3GT Racing	(Canada) Kyle Marcelli	1:25.010	+8.829	27
28	GTD	96	(United States) Turner Motorsport	(United States) Bill Auberlen	1:25.034	+8.853	28
29	GTD	15	(United States) 3GT Racing	(United Kingdom) Jack Hawksworth	1:25.170	+8.989	29
30	GTD	63	(United States) Scuderia Corsa	(United States) Cooper MacNeil	1:25.404	+9.223	30
31	GTD	93	(United States) Meyer Shank Racing with Curb-Agajanin	(United States) Justin Marks	1:25.629	+9.448	31
32	GTD	64	(United States) Scuderia Corsa	(United States) Frankie Montecalvo	1:26.107	+9.926	32
33	GTD	44	(United States) Magnus Racing	(United States) John Potter	1:26.411	+10.230	34^{3}
34	GTD	51	(Italy) Squadra Corse Garage Italia	(United States) Francesco Piovanetti	1:27.731	+11.550	33
Sources:

- ^{1} The No. 22 Tequila Patrón ESM entry was moved to the back of the P field for starting the race with a different driver than who qualified.
- ^{2} The No. 54 CORE Autosport entry was moved to the back of the P field for starting the race with a different driver than who qualified.
- ^{3} The No. 44 Magnus Racing entry was moved to the back of the GTD field after the team elected to change tires after qualifying.

== Race ==
=== Post-race ===
The result kept Curran and Nasr atop the Prototype Drivers' Championship with 299 points. Bennett and Braun advanced from third to second while Cameron and Montoya jumped from sixth to fourth. The result kept García and Magnussen atop the GTLM Drivers' Championship with 299 points, 9 points ahead of Briscoe and Westbrook. The result kept Sellers and Snow atop the GTD Drivers' Championship with 303 points, 6 points ahead of Legge. Cadillac, Ford, and Lamborghini continued to top their respective Manufacturers' Championships while Whelen Engineering Racing, Corvette Racing, and Paul Miller Racing kept their respective advantages in the Teams' Championships with one round left in the season.

=== Results ===
Class winners are denoted in bold and ‡.

Final race classification
Pos	Class	No.	Team	Drivers	Chassis	Tire	Laps	Time/Retired
Pos	Class	No.	Team	Drivers	Engine	Tire	Laps	Time/Retired
1	**P**	**22**	**(United States) Tequila Patrón ESM**	**(Brazil) Pipo Derani (United States) Johannes van Overbeek**	**Nissan Onroak DPi**	C	**103**	**2:41.23.487‡**
1	**P**	**22**	**(United States) Tequila Patrón ESM**	**(Brazil) Pipo Derani (United States) Johannes van Overbeek**	**Nissan VR38DETT 3.8 L Turbo V6**	C	**103**	**2:41.23.487‡**
2	P	54	(United States) CORE Autosport	(United States) Jon Bennett (United States) Colin Braun	Oreca 07	C	103	+10.900
2	P	54	(United States) CORE Autosport	(United States) Jon Bennett (United States) Colin Braun	Gibson GK428 4.2 L V8	C	103	+10.900
3	P	6	(United States) Acura Team Penske	(United States) Dane Cameron (Colombia) Juan Pablo Montoya	Acura ARX-05	C	103	+13.396
3	P	6	(United States) Acura Team Penske	(United States) Dane Cameron (Colombia) Juan Pablo Montoya	Acura AR35TT 3.5 L Turbo V6	C	103	+13.396
4	P	55	(Germany) Mazda Team Joest	(United States) Jonathan Bomarito (United Kingdom) Harry Tincknell	Mazda RT24-P	C	103	+16.872
4	P	55	(Germany) Mazda Team Joest	(United States) Jonathan Bomarito (United Kingdom) Harry Tincknell	Mazda MZ-2.0T 2.0L Turbo I4	C	103	+16.872
5	P	31	(United States) Whelen Engineering Racing	(Brazil) Felipe Nasr (United States) Eric Curran	Cadillac DPi-V.R	C	103	+30.034
5	P	31	(United States) Whelen Engineering Racing	(Brazil) Felipe Nasr (United States) Eric Curran	Cadillac 5.5 L V8	C	103	+30.034
6	P	99	(United States) JDC-Miller MotorSports	(Canada) Misha Goikhberg (South Africa) Stephen Simpson	Oreca 07	C	103	+40.775
6	P	99	(United States) JDC-Miller MotorSports	(Canada) Misha Goikhberg (South Africa) Stephen Simpson	Gibson GK428 4.2 L V8	C	103	+40.775
7	P	85	(United States) JDC-Miller MotorSports	(United States) Robert Alon (Switzerland) Simon Trummer	Oreca 07	C	103	+51.236
7	P	85	(United States) JDC-Miller MotorSports	(United States) Robert Alon (Switzerland) Simon Trummer	Gibson GK428 4.2 L V8	C	103	+51.236
8	P	52	(United States) AFS/PR1 Mathiasen Motorsports	(Colombia) Sebastián Saavedra (Colombia) Gustavo Yacamán	Oreca 07	C	102	+1 lap
8	P	52	(United States) AFS/PR1 Mathiasen Motorsports	(Colombia) Sebastián Saavedra (Colombia) Gustavo Yacamán	Gibson GK428 4.2 L V8	C	102	+1 lap
9	P	77	(Germany) Mazda Team Joest	(United Kingdom) Oliver Jarvis (United States) Tristan Nunez	Mazda RT24-P	C	101	+2 Laps
9	P	77	(Germany) Mazda Team Joest	(United Kingdom) Oliver Jarvis (United States) Tristan Nunez	Mazda MZ-2.0T 2.0L Turbo I4	C	101	+2 Laps
10	**GTLM**	**25**	**(United States) BMW Team RLL**	**(United States) Connor De Phillippi** **(United Kingdom) Alexander Sims**	BMW M8 GTE	M	**100**	**+3 Laps‡**
10	**GTLM**	**25**	**(United States) BMW Team RLL**	**(United States) Connor De Phillippi** **(United Kingdom) Alexander Sims**	**BMW S63 4.0 L Turbo V8**	M	**100**	**+3 Laps‡**
11	GTLM	912	(United States) Porsche GT Team	(New Zealand) Earl Bamber (Belgium) Laurens Vanthoor	Porsche 911 RSR	M	100	+3 Laps
11	GTLM	912	(United States) Porsche GT Team	(New Zealand) Earl Bamber (Belgium) Laurens Vanthoor	Porsche 4.0 L Flat-6	M	100	+3 Laps
12	GTLM	3	(United States) Corvette Racing	(Spain) Antonio García (Denmark) Jan Magnussen	Chevrolet Corvette C7.R	M	100	+3 Laps
12	GTLM	3	(United States) Corvette Racing	(Spain) Antonio García (Denmark) Jan Magnussen	Chevrolet LT5.5 5.5 L V8	M	100	+3 Laps
13	GTLM	24	(United States) BMW Team RLL	(United States) John Edwards (Finland) Jesse Krohn	BMW M8 GTE	M	100	+3 Laps
13	GTLM	24	(United States) BMW Team RLL	(United States) John Edwards (Finland) Jesse Krohn	BMW S63 4.0 L Turbo V8	M	100	+3 Laps
14	GTLM	4	(United States) Corvette Racing	(United Kingdom) Oliver Gavin (United States) Tommy Milner	Chevrolet Corvette C7.R	M	100	+3 Laps
14	GTLM	4	(United States) Corvette Racing	(United Kingdom) Oliver Gavin (United States) Tommy Milner	Chevrolet LT5.5 5.5 L V8	M	100	+3 Laps
15	P	7	(United States) Acura Team Penske	(Brazil) Hélio Castroneves (United States) Ricky Taylor	Acura ARX-05	C	99	+4 Laps
15	P	7	(United States) Acura Team Penske	(Brazil) Hélio Castroneves (United States) Ricky Taylor	Acura AR35TT 3.5 L Turbo V6	C	99	+4 Laps
16	**GTD**	**86**	**(United States) Meyer Shank Racing with Curb-Agajanin**	**(United Kingdom) Katherine Legge** **(Portugal) Álvaro Parente**	**Acura NSX GT3**	C	**97**	**+6 Laps‡**
16	**GTD**	**86**	**(United States) Meyer Shank Racing with Curb-Agajanin**	**(United Kingdom) Katherine Legge** **(Portugal) Álvaro Parente**	**Acura 3.5 L Turbo V6**	C	**97**	**+6 Laps‡**
17	GTD	73	(United States) Park Place Motorsports	(Germany) Jörg Bergmeister (United States) Patrick Lindsey	Porsche 911 GT3 R	C	97	+6 Laps
17	GTD	73	(United States) Park Place Motorsports	(Germany) Jörg Bergmeister (United States) Patrick Lindsey	Porsche 4.0 L Flat-6	C	97	+6 Laps
18	GTD	33	(United States) Mercedes-AMG Team Riley Motorsport	(Netherlands) Jeroen Bleekemolen (United States) Ben Keating	Mercedes AMG GT3	C	97	+6 Laps
18	GTD	33	(United States) Mercedes-AMG Team Riley Motorsport	(Netherlands) Jeroen Bleekemolen (United States) Ben Keating	Mercedes-AMG M159 6.2 L V8	C	97	+6 Laps
19	GTD	48	(United States) Paul Miller Racing	(United States) Bryan Sellers (United States) Madison Snow	Lamborghini Huracán GT3	C	97	+6 Laps
19	GTD	48	(United States) Paul Miller Racing	(United States) Bryan Sellers (United States) Madison Snow	Lamborghini 5.2 L V10	C	97	+6 Laps
20	GTD	44	(United States) Magnus Racing	(United States) John Potter (United States) Andy Lally	Audi R8 LMS	C	96	+7 Laps
20	GTD	44	(United States) Magnus Racing	(United States) John Potter (United States) Andy Lally	Audi 5.2L V10	C	96	+7 Laps
21	GTD	51	(Italy) Squadra Corse Garage Italia	(United States) Francesco Piovanetti (Brazil) Oswaldo Negri Jr.	Ferrari 488 GT3	C	96	+7 Laps
21	GTD	51	(Italy) Squadra Corse Garage Italia	(United States) Francesco Piovanetti (Brazil) Oswaldo Negri Jr.	Ferrari F154CB 3.9 L Turbo V8	C	96	+7 Laps
22	GTD	15	(United States) 3GT Racing	(United Kingdom) Jack Hawksworth (Denmark) David Heinemeier Hansson	Lexus RC F GT3	C	96	+7 Laps
22	GTD	15	(United States) 3GT Racing	(United Kingdom) Jack Hawksworth (Denmark) David Heinemeier Hansson	Lexus 5.0L V8	C	96	+7 Laps
23	GTD	63	(United States) Scuderia Corsa	(United States) Cooper MacNeil (United States) Gunnar Jeannette	Ferrari 488 GT3	C	96	+7 Laps
23	GTD	63	(United States) Scuderia Corsa	(United States) Cooper MacNeil (United States) Gunnar Jeannette	Ferrari F154CB 3.9 L Turbo V8	C	96	+7 Laps
24	GTD	64	(United States) Scuderia Corsa	(United States) Townsend Bell (United States) Frankie Montecalvo	Ferrari 488 GT3	C	96	+7 Laps
24	GTD	64	(United States) Scuderia Corsa	(United States) Townsend Bell (United States) Frankie Montecalvo	Ferrari F154CB 3.9 L Turbo V8	C	96	+7 Laps
25	GTD	14	(United States) 3GT Racing	(Austria) Dominik Baumann (Canada) Kyle Marcelli	Lexus RC F GT3	C	96	+7 Laps
25	GTD	14	(United States) 3GT Racing	(Austria) Dominik Baumann (Canada) Kyle Marcelli	Lexus 5.0L V8	C	96	+7 Laps
26	GTD	58	(United States) Wright Motorsports	(United States) Patrick Long (Denmark) Christina Nielsen	Porsche 911 GT3 R	C	96	+7 Laps
26	GTD	58	(United States) Wright Motorsports	(United States) Patrick Long (Denmark) Christina Nielsen	Porsche 4.0 L Flat-6	C	96	+7 Laps
27 DNF	P	2	(United States) Tequila Patrón ESM	(United Kingdom) Ryan Dalziel (United States) Scott Sharp	Nissan Onroak DPi	C	90	Suspension
27 DNF	P	2	(United States) Tequila Patrón ESM	(United Kingdom) Ryan Dalziel (United States) Scott Sharp	Nissan VR38DETT 3.8 L Turbo V6	C	90	Suspension
28 DNF	GTLM	67	(United States) Ford Chip Ganassi Racing	(Australia) Ryan Briscoe (United Kingdom) Richard Westbrook	Ford GT	M	71	Steering Arn
28 DNF	GTLM	67	(United States) Ford Chip Ganassi Racing	(Australia) Ryan Briscoe (United Kingdom) Richard Westbrook	Ford EcoBoost 3.5 L Turbo V6	M	71	Steering Arn
29 DNF	GTD	96	(United States) Turner Motorsport	(United States) Robby Foley (United States) Bill Auberlen	BMW M6 GT3	C	41	Transmission
29 DNF	GTD	96	(United States) Turner Motorsport	(United States) Robby Foley (United States) Bill Auberlen	BMW 4.4 L Turbo V8	C	41	Transmission
30 DNF	P	10	(United States) Wayne Taylor Racing	(United States) Jordan Taylor (Netherlands) Renger van der Zande	Cadillac DPi-V.R	C	18	Lost Power
30 DNF	P	10	(United States) Wayne Taylor Racing	(United States) Jordan Taylor (Netherlands) Renger van der Zande	Cadillac 5.5 L V8	C	18	Lost Power
31 DNF	GTD	93	(United States) Meyer Shank Racing with Curb-Agajanin	(United States) Justin Marks (United States) Lawson Aschenbach	Acura NSX GT3	C	6	Crash
31 DNF	GTD	93	(United States) Meyer Shank Racing with Curb-Agajanin	(United States) Justin Marks (United States) Lawson Aschenbach	Acura 3.5 L Turbo V6	C	6	Crash
32 DNF	GTLM	66	(United States) Ford Chip Ganassi Racing	(United States) Joey Hand (Germany) Dirk Müller	Ford GT	M	2	Crash
32 DNF	GTLM	66	(United States) Ford Chip Ganassi Racing	(United States) Joey Hand (Germany) Dirk Müller	Ford EcoBoost 3.5 L Turbo V6	M	2	Crash
33 DNF	GTLM	911	(United States) Porsche GT Team	(France) Patrick Pilet (United Kingdom) Nick Tandy	Porsche 911 RSR	M	0	Crash
33 DNF	GTLM	911	(United States) Porsche GT Team	(France) Patrick Pilet (United Kingdom) Nick Tandy	Porsche 4.0 L Flat-6	M	0	Crash
34	P	5	(United States) Mustang Sampling Racing	(Portugal) Filipe Albuquerque (Portugal) João Barbosa	Cadillac DPi-V.R	C	--	Did Not Start (Note: The #5 Mustang Sampling Racing entry was involved in an accident on the opening lap of the race with the #66 Ford Chip Ganassi Racing and #911 Porsche GT Team entries. The car did not cross the start finish line and scored no points.)
34	P	5	(United States) Mustang Sampling Racing	(Portugal) Filipe Albuquerque (Portugal) João Barbosa	Cadillac 5.5 L V8	C	--	Did Not Start

Tyre manufacturers
Key
Symbol	Tyre manufacturer
**C**	Continental
**M**	Michelin

== Standings after the race ==
Prototype Drivers' Championship standings
Pos.	+/–	Driver	Points
1		(United States) Eric Curran (Brazil) Felipe Nasr	254
2	1	(United States) Jon Bennett (United States) Colin Braun	250
3	1	(United States) Jordan Taylor (Netherlands) Renger van der Zande	235
4	2	(United States) Dane Cameron (Colombia) Juan Pablo Montoya	233
5		(Canada) Misha Goikhberg (South Africa) Stephen Simpson	231

GTLM Drivers' Championship standings
Pos.	+/–	Driver	Points
1		(Spain) Antonio García (Denmark) Jan Magnussen	299
2		(Australia) Ryan Briscoe (United Kingdom) Richard Westbrook	290
3		(United States) Joey Hand (Germany) Dirk Müller	284
4	1	(New Zealand) Earl Bamber (Belgium) Laurens Vanthoor	283
5	1	(United Kingdom) Oliver Gavin (United States) Tommy Milner	278

GTD Drivers' Championship standings
Pos.	+/–	Driver	Points
1		(United States) Bryan Sellers (United States) Madison Snow	303
2		(United Kingdom) Katherine Legge	297
3		(Netherlands) Jeroen Bleekemolen (United States) Ben Keating	276
4		(United States) Cooper MacNeil	260
5		(Austria) Dominik Baumann (Canada) Kyle Marcelli	248

- Note: Only the top five positions are included for all sets of standings.

Prototype Teams' Championship standings
Pos.	+/–	Team	Points
1		(United States) No. 31 Whelen Engineering Racing	254
2	1	(United States) No. 54 CORE Autosport	250
3	1	(United States) No. 10 Wayne Taylor Racing	235
4	2	(United States) No. 6 Acura Team Penske	233
5		(United States) No. 99 JDC-Miller Motorsports	231

GTLM Teams' Championship standings
Pos.	+/–	Team	Points
1		(United States) No. 3 Corvette Racing	299
2		(United States) No. 67 Ford Chip Ganassi Racing	290
3		(United States) No. 66 Ford Chip Ganassi Racing	284
4	1	(United States) No. 912 Porsche GT Team	283
5	1	(United States) No. 4 Corvette Racing	278

GTD Teams' Championship standings
Pos.	+/–	Team	Points
1		(United States) No. 48 Paul Miller Racing	303
2		(United States) No. 86 Meyer Shank Racing with Curb-Agajanin	297
3		(United States) No. 33 Mercedes-AMG Team Riley Motorsports	276
4		(United States) No. 63 Scuderia Corsa	240
5		(United States) No. 14 3GT Racing	248

- Note: Only the top five positions are included for all sets of standings.

Prototype Manufacturers' Championship standings
Pos.	+/–	Manufacturer	Points
1		(United States) Cadillac	297
2		(United States) Acura	284
3		(Japan) Nissan	274
4		(Japan) Mazda	268

GTLM Manufacturers' Championship standings
Pos.	+/–	Manufacturer	Points
1		(United States) Ford	323
2		(United States) Chevrolet	313
3		(Germany) Porsche	306
4		(Germany) BMW	302
5		(Italy) Ferrari	58

GTD Manufacturers' Championship standings
Pos.	+/–	Manufacturer	Points
1		(Italy) Lamborghini	310
2		(United States) Acura	298
3		(Japan) Lexus	282
4		(Germany) Mercedes-AMG	282
5		(Italy) Ferrari	275

- Note: Only the top five positions are included for all sets of standings.

IMSA SportsCar Championship
Previous race: Oak Tree Grand Prix	2018 season	Next race: Petit Le Mans
