= Junior Strous =

Dutch racing driver

- Nationality: Netherlands
- Born: Ton Strous Jr. 28 April 1986 (age 40) Vlaardingen, Netherlands
- Debut season: 2002

Benelux Radical Cup
- Years active: 2011
- Teams: Winners Circle Group
- Starts: 11
- Wins: 9
- Poles: 7
- Fastest laps: 3
- Best finish: 1st in 2011

Previous series
- 2007-08 2007 2006-07 2003, 2006 2006 2003-06 2003-2005 2005 2005 2003-2004 2002-2003 2002 2002: Firestone Indy Lights Series; Atlantic Championship; BRL V6; Dacia Logan Cup Netherlands; BMW Compact Cup Benelux; Formula Renault 2.0 Italia; Eurocup Formula Renault 2.0; FR2.0 Netherlands; FR2.0 UK Winter Series; FR2.0 Nordic Series; Fran Am Winter World; Formula BMW ADAC; Formula Ford 1800 Benelux; FF Zetec Netherlands

Championship titles
- BMW Compact Cup Benelux; FR2.0 Netherlands; FR2.0 USA Winter Invitational; FR2.0 UK Winter Series

Awards
- 2008: Gilles Villeneuve Award

Ton Strous Jr. (born 28 April 1986 in Vlaardingen) better known as Junior Strous, is a Dutch racing driver, racing team owner, and entrepreneur from Wassenaar. He has competed at various levels and classes of formula racing starting his professional career in Formula Ford at Geva Racing in 2002, advancing into Formula BMW, Formula Renault, Champcar Atlantic and Indycar Lights.

== Early life ==
Strous was born in the Netherlands in 1986. He is the son of athlete and racecar driver Ton Strous. In 1992, Strous' father and mother, a part-time yoga instructor and businesswoman, started a carwash and detailing business. During a family trip to Tenerife, Spain when Strous was ten years old, he became interested in racing after his first lap around a track in a go-cart. Since then, Strous had a career during his childhood in karting until he became a professional driver and began testing in Benelux Formula Ford.

== Career ==
=== Racing career ===
After testing in Benelux Formula Ford in 2000 and 2001, Strous went on to become the youngest Formula Ford driver to win an international race (Spa-Francorchamps circuit in Belgium) with a B-class car in 2002. Later in 2002, Strous moved up to Formula BMW ADAC.

In 2003, Strous won the Benelux BMW 325i Cup and Dutch Drifting Cup and competed in competed in several Formula Renault series in the United States and Europe and finished second in the Benelux championship.

Strous was the Benelux Formula Renault champion in 2004, and later that year, the series' champion of Formula Renault Winter Invitational Championship in Florida. That same year, Strous finished third in the Autovisie Drifting Championship and became a test driver for Toyo Tires.

During the 2005 season, Strous drove in four different Formula Renault series in 2005, finishing seventh in the Eurocup championship (not driving all races), second in the Dutch championship (not driving all races), and he won the UK Winter Series. He also won several races in the 2005-06 Winter Endurance Championship.

In 2006, Strous ventured into touring cars full-time, winning the BMW Compact Cup Benelux and finishing second in the Dacia Logan Cup Netherlands. He competed some races with Jenzer Motorsport in the European Formula Renault Championship and Italian Formula Renault Championship.

In 2007, Strous competed part-time in the Champ Car Atlantic Championship and finished 14th in points (not driving all races because of a broken wrist).

In 2008, Strous participated full-time in the Atlantic Championship where he tied for fourth place in points at the end of the championship, finished in fifth place, and he won at Circuit Mont-Tremblant for Condor Motorsports.

For 2009, Strous competed full-time in the Firestone Indy Lights Series with his own team, Winners Circle Group. He won the first two races of the season at Grand Prix of St. Petersburg and led the championship through four rounds. That same year, Strous also won first place at the first race of the Tango Dutch GT4 Championship in Zandvoort. He then came in third in the second round and finished sixth in the third round racing in an Aston Martin V8 Vantage GT4. After the Freedom 100, sponsorship was cut off to Winners Circle group's technical team partner, despite the strong results.

Strous signed on to return to Indy Lights in 2010 with Team Moore Racing. However, less than a month after signing, the team indicated that he had been released from his contract. Instead, Strous joined the HVM Racing team for the 2010 Indy Lights season.

At the SuperSports Class races in 2011, Strous came in fourth place in the first race, and won the second race.

Strous competed in the inaugural Benelux Radical Championship in 2011 coming in first place, winning in the Radical SR3 RS car.

=== Crashes and injuries ===
During the Assen Circuit held in the Netherlands in 2003, Strous crashed after his teammate, Giedo van der Garde accelerated too early on a turn and spun out, hitting Strous' car.

In 2005, Strous was driving for the Osschersleben Circuit in Germany at the Formula Renault 2.0 when his new car crashed and flipped. During a qualifying drive at the Long Beach Circuit for the Champcar Atlantics Series in 2007, Strous crashed, breaking his wrist in the process.

== Other activities ==
Strous is also a drifting specialist, and he founded Winners Circle Group Racing division in 2009. Strous has also participated as a TV commentator for Dutch national racing channel, RaceWorld TV. Strous has also provided commentary for DTM, ChampCar and IndyCar races, and he was sponsored by SLAM!FM, a Dutch radio station, in 2011.

=== Criminal justice ===
Strous' family business, a Shell gas station in Wassenaar, was broken into in 2008 and Junior Strous witnessed the crime and pursued the three criminals in a high-speed chase until they spun out of control and drove off the road. The authorities found and arrested one of the individuals and also cited Strous for speeding, but the charges against Strous were later dropped due to the Dutch law (Article 53 of the Code of Criminal Citizens) that allows citizens to pursue criminals when caught in the act.

In 2010, while traveling internationally, Strous noticed security flaws at the Amsterdam Airport Schiphol that would allow travelers to bring in unchecked luggage. Strous reported the discovery to the authorities for further review.

In 2011, Strous assisted a stranger when he extinguished a fire in a car stopped on the road in Wassenaar. He filmed the incident on his phone and posted the video, but it was later removed after the fire department requested it be taken down.

== Personal life ==
Strous spends his spare time traveling and is an art dealer for artist Michiel Molenaar. As of 2014, Strous resides in Lyss, Switzerland. Strous currently runs his family's Shell Petrolstation in Wassenaar also setting up a carwash called Mr.Glow Carwash which washes cars and golfballs.

== Racing results ==
=== Complete Eurocup Formula Renault 2.0 results ===
(key) (Races in bold indicate pole position; races in italics indicate fastest lap)

Year	Entrant	1	2	3	4	5	6	7	8	9	10	11	12	13	14	15	16	DC	Points
2005	Mr Glow Motorsport	ZOL; 1; 4	ZOL; 2; 32	VAL; 1; 20	VAL; 2; 11	LMS; 1; 12	LMS; 2; 2	BIL; 1; 10	BIL; 2; 7	OSC; 1 Ret	OSC; 2; 11	DON; 1; 12	DON; 2; 2	EST; 1; 12	EST; 2; 8	MNZ; 1; 9	MNZ; 2 Ret	7th	43
2006	Jenzer Motorsport	ZOL; 1; 10	ZOL; 2; 12	IST; 1; 14	IST; 2; 13	MIS; 1	MIS; 2	NÜR; 1	NÜR; 2	DON; 1	DON; 2	LMS; 1	LMS; 2	CAT; 1	CAT; 2			26th	1

=== American open–wheel results ===
(key)

==== Atlantic Championship ====
Year	Team	1	2	3	4	5	6	7	8	9	10	11	12	Rank	Points
2007	Condor Motorsports	LVG; 6	LBH; 13	HOU; DNS	POR1; 9	POR2; 8	CLE; 13	MTT; 23	TOR; 13	EDM1; DNS	EDM2; DNS	SJO; 5	ROA; 23	14th	92
2008	Newman Wachs Racing	LBH; 8	LS; 3	**MTT**; 1	EDM1; 13	EDM2; 9	ROA1; 8	ROA2; 11	TRR; 3	NJ; 5	UTA; 8	ATL; 8		5th	196

==== Indy Lights ====
Year	Team	1	2	3	4	5	6	7	8	9	10	11	12	13	14	15	Rank	Points	Ref
2009	Winners Circle Group	STP; 1	STP; 1	LBH; 23	KAN; 11	INDY; 10	MIL	IOW	WGL	TOR	EDM	KTY	MOH	SNM	CHI	HMS	**20th**	**146**	
2010	HVM Racing	STP; 10	ALA; 8	LBH; 18	INDY	IOW	WGL	TOR	EDM	MOH	SNM	CHI	KTY	HMS			**19th**	**56**	

Sporting positions
Preceded by Paul Meijer	Dutch Formula Renault champion 2004	Succeeded by Renger van der Zande
