= Tõnis Kasemets =

Estonian racing driver

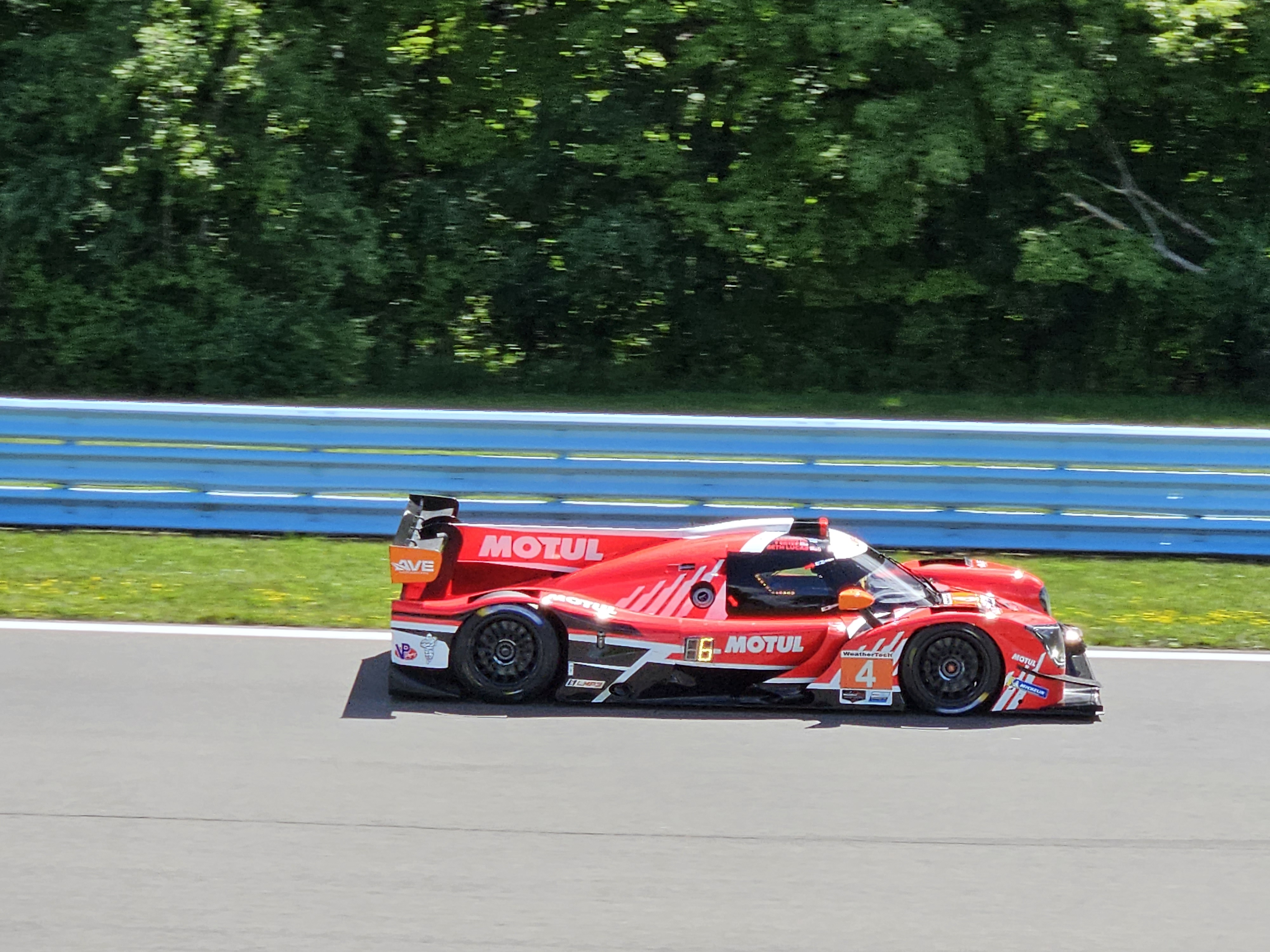
- Kasemets competing in LMP3 in 2023
- Nationality: (Estonia) Estonian
- Born: March 17, 1974 (age 52) Pärnu, then part of Estonian SSR, Soviet Union
- Categorisation: FIA Gold (until 2015); FIA Silver (2016–2021); FIA Bronze (2022–)
- Achievements: 2022 IMSA Prototype Challenge champion driver 2025 USF Pro 2000 Championship Engineer of the Year

Champ Car career
- 5 races run over 1 year
- Team: Rocketsports Racing
- Best finish: 19th (2006)
- First race: 2006 Grand Prix of Portland (Portland)
- Last race: 2006 Grand Prix of Road America (Road America)
Wins	Podiums	Poles
0	0	0

Tõnis Kasemets (born March 17, 1974) is an Estonian racing driver, engineer and team owner. A former open-wheel racer, Kasemets was the 2005 Atlantic Championship runner-up and competed part-time in the Champ Car World Series. In endurance racing, he won the 2022 IMSA Prototype Challenge and competed in LMP2.

== Career ==
Kasemets started racing karts in 1982, winning the Baltic championships in 1992 and 1993. In 1995, Kasemets moved to the United States to race in the American series. He advanced through the open wheel ranks and by 2004 was in the Toyota Atlantic series. In 2005, he placed second in the series championship to Charles Zwolsman Jr.. He participated in a partial 2006 schedule in the Champ Car World Series for Paul Gentilozzi's Rocketsports Racing.

To participate in Champ Car in 2006, Kasemets had to gather funds for a quarter of the participation costs. Kasemets wanted to do a full season of Champ Car in 2007 and in the future he wants to own a successful team à la Newman-Haas and Forsythe. However, he has not appeared in a Champ Car or IndyCar Series race since 2006. He continued racing in the Atlantic Championship until its closure after the 2009 season and made his Firestone Indy Lights debut on the Streets of Long Beach in April 2010.

Kasemets has competed in some Grand Am Road Racing events, including the 2013 Rolex 24 Hours of Daytona.

Kasemets, whose North American career included driving stints at Pabst Racing, has parlayed that relationship into being a driver coach and engineer for the team. He won the 2025 USF Pro 2000 Championship as engineer for driver Max Garcia.

== Personal life ==
Kasemets currently lives in Mundelein, Illinois with his son and daughter.

== Racing record ==
=== SCCA National Championship Runoffs ===
Year	Track	Car	Engine	Class	Finish	Start	Status
1999	Mid-Ohio	Carbir	Ford	Formula Continental	23	6	DNF
2000	Mid-Ohio	Mygale 99	Ford	Formula Continental	1	2	Running
2003	Mid-Ohio	Swift 008.a	Toyota 4AGE	Formula Atlantic	20	8	Running
2005	Mid-Ohio	Alfa Romeo		GT Lite	DNS	7	DNS
2007	Heartland Park	Swift 014.a	Toyota 4AGE	Formula Atlantic	2	2	Running
2008	Heartland Park	Vestal 09F	Ford Kent	Formula Ford	2	2	Running

=== American open–wheel racing results ===
(key)

==== Atlantic Championship ====
Year	Team	1	2	3	4	5	6	7	8	9	10	11	12	13	14	15	Rank	Points
2004	Brooks Associates Racing	LBH; 18	MTY	MIL	POR1; 11	POR2; 12	CLE; 9	TOR	VAN	ROA; 5	DEN	MTL	LS; 5				13th	81
2005	Team Tonis	LBH; 15	MTY; 2	POR1; 1	**POR2**; 1	**CLE1**; 2	CLE2; 4	TOR; 8	EDM; 5	SJO; 19	DEN; 8	**ROA**; 1	MTL; 2				2nd	289
2007	Newman Wachs Racing	LVG	LBH	HOU	POR1	POR2	CLE	MTT	TOR	EDM1	EDM2	SJO	ROA; 17				29th	4
2008	Genoa Racing	LBH	LS	MTT	EDM1	EDM2	ROA1; 3	ROA2; 3	TRR	NJ	UTA	ATL					21st	51
2009	Polestar Motor Racing	SEB; 7		NJ1; 6	NJ2; 7	LIM; 5	ACC1; 5	ACC2; 3	MOH; 12	TRR; 4	MOS; 6	ATL; 9	LS; 4				5th	103
2009	Genoa Racing		UTA; 5														5th	103
2012	K-Hill Motorsports	ATL1	ATL2	NJ1	NJ2	**SUM1**; 1	SUM2; 6										9th	87
2015	K-Hill Motorsports	**PBI**; 1	ATL	ATL	WGL	WGL	VIR	VIR	MOH	MOH	PIT	PIT	NJMP	NJMP	PIT; 10	PIT; 1	18th	53
2023	K-Hill Motorsports	ATL	ATL	MOH	MOH	PIT	PIT	ROA; DNS	ROA; 2	SUM	SUM						10th	44

==== Indy Lights ====
Year	Team	1	2	3	4	5	6	7	8	9	10	11	12	13	14	Rank	Points	Ref
2010	Team PBIR	STP	ALA	LBH; 6	INDY	IOW	WGL									**18th**	**56**	
2010	Andersen Racing							TOR; 6	EDM	MOH	SNM	CHI	KTY	HMS		**18th**	**56**	
2011	Team Moore Racing	STP	ALA	LBH	INDY	MIL	IOW	TOR	EDM1	EDM2	TRO	NHM	BAL; 8	KTY	LVS	**27th**	**24**	

==== Champ Car ====
Year	Team	No.	1	2	3	4	5	6	7	8	9	10	11	12	13	14	Rank	Points	Ref
2006	Rocketsports Racing	18	LBH	HOU	MTY	MIL	POR; 16	CLE; 12	TOR; 15	EDM; 11	SJO	DEN	MTL	ROA; 17	SRF	MXC	**19th**	**34**	

==== IMSA Prototype Challenge ====
Season	Series	Team	Races	Wins	Poles	F/Laps	Podiums	Points	Position
2019	IMSA Prototype Challenge	Wulver Racing	6	0	0	1	2	139	**4th**
2020	IMSA Prototype Challenge	Wulver Racing	6	0	0	0	0	134	**11th**
2021	IMSA Prototype Challenge	Wulver Racing	5	0	0	1	0	1070	**10th**
2022	IMSA Prototype Challenge	Wulver Racing	5	4	3	0	5	1720	**1st**

==== WeatherTech SportsCar Championship ====
(key) (Races in bold indicate pole position; results in italics indicate fastest lap)

Year	Team	Class	Make	Engine	1	2	3	4	5	6	7	Pos.	Points	Ref
2021	Wulver Motorsports	LMP3	Ligier JS P320	Nissan VK56DE 5.6 L V8	DAY	SEB	MOH	WGL	WGL	ELK; 6	PET	29th	276	
2023	Ave Motorsports	LMP3	Ligier JS P320	Nissan VK56DE 5.6L V8	DAY	SEB; 5	WGL; 6	MOS	ELK; 6	IMS	PET	19th	808	
2024	Sean Creech Motorsport	LMP2	Ligier JS P217	Gibson GK428 4.2 L V8	DAY	SEB	WGL	MOS	ELK; 8	IMS	ATL	51st	253	
2024	Team Tonis	LMP2	Oreca 07	Gibson GK428 4.2 L V8	DAY	SEB	WGL	MOS	ELK; 10	IMS	ATL	55th	238	
