= 2010 Atlantic Championship season =

American motorsport season in 2010

- Cooper Tires Presents the Atlantic Championship Powered by Mazda

Season
- Races: ~~14~~
- Start date: ~~March 19th~~
- End date: ~~October 1st~~

Awards

The 2010 IMSA Cooper Tires Atlantic Championship season was due to be the 37th Atlantic Championship season, and the second one under the sanctioning of the International Motor Sports Association. However, on March 3, 2010 — just over two weeks prior to the scheduled opening round — series personnel announced that the 2010 season had been placed on hold.

== Race schedule ==
A twelve-race calendar was announced on November 13, 2009. Five races were due to support the American Le Mans Series, with two more supporting the Rolex Sports Car Series. The remaining five races were due to be feature or co-feature events, including both double-header weekends.

| Round | Circuit | Location | Date | Supporting |
|---|---|---|---|---|
| 1 | Sebring International Raceway | Sebring, Florida | March 19 | American Le Mans Series |
| 2 | Mazda Raceway Laguna Seca | Monterey, California | May 22 | American Le Mans Series |
| 3 | Lime Rock Park | Lakeville, Connecticut | May 29 | Rolex Sports Car Series |
| 4 | Mid-Ohio Sports Car Course | Lexington, Ohio | June 20 | Rolex Sports Car Series |
| 5 | New Jersey Motorsports Park | Millville, New Jersey | June 26 | Feature |
| 6 | New Jersey Motorsports Park | Millville, New Jersey | June 27 | Feature |
| 7 | Miller Motorsports Park | Tooele, Utah | July 10 | American Le Mans Series |
| 8 | Lime Rock Park | Lakeville, Connecticut | July 24 | American Le Mans Series |
| 9 | Autobahn Country Club | Joliet, Illinois | July 31 | Feature |
| 10 | Autobahn Country Club | Joliet, Illinois | August 1 | Feature |
| 11 | Circuit Trois-Rivières | Trois-Rivières, Québec | August 15 | Co-Feature w/ Continental Tire Sports Car Challenge |
| 12 | Road Atlanta | Braselton, Georgia | October 1 | American Le Mans Series |

== Drivers and teams ==
Swan Racing, Jensen MotorSport, Condor Motorsports, Paladin Motorsports, US RaceTronics, Comprent Motorsport, Polestar Racing Group and Team Tonis had announced plans to contest the championship. The only driver announced prior to the 2010 season hiatus was Zach Veach, who was due to become the series' youngest ever driver.
