= 2008 Atlantic Championship =

Formula race car championship

2008 Atlantic Championship season
- Cooper Tires Presents the Atlantic Championship Powered by Mazda

Season
- Races: 11
- Start date: April 20
- End date: October 3

Awards
- Drivers' champion: (Finland) Markus Niemelä

The 2008 Atlantic Championship season was the thirty-fifth Atlantic Championship season. It began on April 20, 2008 and ended on October 4, 2008. Despite the merger of Champ Car's premier series with the Indy Racing League, the Champ Car owners continued to own and operate the Atlantic Championship under a new legal entity, Atlantic Racing Series, LLC. Champ Car continued to sanction the first two events of the season at Long Beach and Laguna Seca with the remainder of the season running under IMSA sanction. The Cooper Tires Presents the Atlantic Championship Powered by Mazda Drivers' Champion was Markus Niemelä driving for Brooks Associates Racing.

== Teams and drivers ==
The following teams and drivers competed in the 2008 Atlantic Championship season. All teams used the Swift 016.a chassis powered by a Mazda-Cosworth MZR 2.3 liter inline-4 engine and Cooper tires.

Team	No	Drivers	Rounds
(Canada) Jensen MotorSport	2	(Finland) Henri Karjalainen	1–10
(Canada) Jensen MotorSport	22	(Canada) Eric Jensen	8–9
(United States) Forsythe Championship Racing	3	(Canada) James Hinchcliffe	All
(United States) Forsythe Championship Racing	7	(Mexico) David Garza	1–5, 11
(United States) Forsythe Championship Racing	7	(Mexico) David Martínez	6–10
(United States) Walker Racing	5	(United Kingdom) Greg Mansell	All
(United States) Walker Racing	15	(United Kingdom) Leo Mansell	All
(United States) Walker Racing	25	(Canada) Kevin Lacroix	All
(United States) Condor Motorsports	6	(Netherlands) Junior Strous	All
(United States) Condor Motorsports	9	(Netherlands) Dominick Muermans	All
(United States) Condor Motorsports	11	(Brazil) Douglas Soares	All
(United States) Condor Motorsports	77	(United States) Brian Thienes	1
(United States) Brooks Associates Racing	8	(Finland) Markus Niemelä	All
(United States) Brooks Associates Racing	88	(Germany) Andreas Wirth	1–3
(United States) Brooks Associates Racing	88	(United States) Tom Sutherland	4–11
(United States) Pacific Coast Motorsports	14	(United States) Carl Skerlong	1–10
(United States) Pacific Coast Motorsports	41	(United States) Frankie Muniz	All
(United States) Genoa Racing	17	(United States) Alan Sciuto	1
(United States) Genoa Racing	17	(Estonia) Tõnis Kasemets	6–7
(United States) Genoa Racing	17	(United States) J. R. Hildebrand	11
(United States) Genoa Racing	19	(United States) Dane Cameron	All
(United States) Mathiasen Motorsports	26	(United States) Jonathan Bomarito	All
(United States) PR1 Motorsports	32	(Canada) Mike Forest	1
(United States) Newman Wachs Racing	34	(Switzerland) Simona de Silvestro	All
(United States) Newman Wachs Racing	36	(United States) Jonathan Summerton	All
(United States) Paladin Motorsports	45	(Canada) Greg Minium	1
(United States) Paladin Motorsports	45	(Austria) Christopher Zöchling	2, 4–5
(United States) EuroInternational	46	(Venezuela) Luis Schiavo	1–8, 11
(United States) EuroInternational	70	(Canada) Daniel Morad	1–8
(United States) Polestar Motor Racing	66	(United States) Rich Zober	9

== Schedule ==
The original 13-race 2008 Atlantic Championship calendar, which featured many supporting runs during Champ Car World Series events, had to be scrapped as a result of the 2008 open-wheel reunification announcement. The Long Beach, Laguna Seca, Edmonton, Mont-Tremblant and Road America races, which had been part of the Champ Car schedule before reunification, remained in the calendar. The Road America races were changed, as the American Le Mans Series' Generac 500 weekend meet was changed from one to two races (a Saturday and Sunday race). The Edmonton race, now part of the IndyCar Series, also switched to a two-race format. The original races at Trois-Rivieres and Miller were not affected, since the Quebec race was part of the Grand Prix of Trois-Rivieres (which also features the NASCAR Canadian Tire Series), and the Utah race was conducted as part of the Rolex Sports Car Series Sunchaser 1000 weekend. On April 3 a revised post-reunification schedule was released featuring 11 races including the seven weekends that were kept (with two races at Edmonton and Road America), and two new races, one at New Jersey and a second Road Atlanta (as a support race to the Petit Le Mans).

Rd	Race Date	Race Name	Circuit	City/Location
1	April 20	(United States) Imperial Capital Bank Atlantic Challenge of Long Beach	Long Beach Grand Prix	Long Beach, California
2	May 18	(United States) Monterey Festival of Speed Atlantic Championship	Mazda Raceway Laguna Seca	Monterey, California
3	June 29	(Canada) Sommet des Legends	Circuit Mont-Tremblant	Mont-Tremblant, Quebec
4	July 25	(Canada) Rexall Edmonton Indy Twin Races	Edmonton Indy	Edmonton, Alberta
5	July 26	(Canada) Rexall Edmonton Indy Twin Races	Edmonton Indy	Edmonton, Alberta
6	August 9	(United States) Road Race Showcase/Road America	Road America	Elkhart Lake, Wisconsin
7	August 10	(United States) Road Race Showcase/Road America	Road America	Elkhart Lake, Wisconsin
8	August 17	(Canada) Grand Prix de Trois-Rivières	Circuit Trois-Rivières	Trois-Rivières, Quebec
9	September 14	(United States) Mazda Formula Zoom Zoom	New Jersey Motorsports Park	Millville, New Jersey
10	September 21	(United States) SunRichGourmet.com 1000	Miller Motorsports Park	Tooele, Utah
11	October 3	(United States) Atlanta Atlantic Challenge	Road Atlanta	Braselton, Georgia

Cancelled events

Original date	Race name	Track	City
April 27	(United States) Atlantic Grand Prix of Houston	JAGFlo Speedway at Reliant Park	Houston, Texas
June 22	(United States) Atlantic Grand Prix of Cleveland	Burke Lakefront Airport	Cleveland, Ohio
July 6	(Canada) Steelback Atlantic Grand Prix	Exhibition Place	Toronto, Ontario
July 26	(United States) Atlantic Grand Prix of Portland	Portland International Raceway	Portland, Oregon
July 27	(United States) Atlantic Grand Prix of Portland	Portland International Raceway	Portland, Oregon
November 9	(Mexico) Atlantic Gran Premio Tecate	Autódromo Hermanos Rodríguez	Mexico City, Mexico

=== Television ===
The 2008 series was televised at 5 PM ET on Sundays starting on November 9, 2008 on Speed TV.

- November 9 – Grand Prix of Long Beach
- November 16 – Laguna Seca and Race 1 of Edmonton
- December 14 – Race 2 of Edmonton and Race 1 of Road America
- December 21 – Race 2 of Road America and Trois Rivières
- December 28 – Miller Motorsports Park and Road Atlanta

== Race results ==
Rd	Track	Pole Position	Fastest Lap	Race winner		Report
Rd	Track	Pole Position	Fastest Lap	Driver	Team	Report
1	Long Beach Grand Prix	(United States) Jonathan Bomarito	(United States) Carl Skerlong	(Switzerland) Simona de Silvestro	Newman Wachs Racing	Report
2	Mazda Raceway Laguna Seca	(Canada) James Hinchcliffe	(Brazil) Douglas Soares	(Canada) James Hinchcliffe	Forsythe Pettit Racing	Report
3	Circuit Mont-Tremblant	(Netherlands) Junior Strous	(Netherlands) Junior Strous	(Netherlands) Junior Strous	Condor Motorsports	Report
4	Edmonton Indy	(Canada) James Hinchcliffe	(Mexico) David Garza Pérez	(United States) Jonathan Bomarito	Mathiasen Motorsports	Report
5	Edmonton Indy	(United States) Carl Skerlong	(United States) Carl Skerlong	(United States) Jonathan Summerton	Newman Wachs Racing	Report
6	Road America	(United States) Dane Cameron	(Estonia) Tõnis Kasemets	(United States) Jonathan Bomarito	Mathiasen Motorsports	Report
7	Road America	(United States) Jonathan Bomarito	(United States) Dane Cameron	(United States) Jonathan Summerton	Newman Wachs Racing	Report
8	Circuit Trois-Rivières	(United States) Jonathan Bomarito	(United States) Jonathan Summerton	(United States) Jonathan Bomarito	Mathiasen Motorsports	Report
9	New Jersey Motorsports Park	(United States) Carl Skerlong	(United States) Carl Skerlong	(United States) Carl Skerlong	Pacific Coast Motorsports	Report
10	Miller Motorsports Park	(Finland) Markus Niemelä	(United States) Carl Skerlong	(Finland) Markus Niemelä	Brooks Associates Racing	Report
11	Road Atlanta	(United States) Jonathan Summerton	(United States) J. R. Hildebrand	(Finland) Markus Niemelä	Brooks Associates Racing	Report

== Race summaries ==
=== Round 1: Imperial Capital Bank Atlantic Challenge of Long Beach ===
- Sunday April 20, 2008 - 1:30 p.m. EDT
- Streets of Long Beach - Long Beach, California (1.968 mile street circuit)
- Time: 50 minutes
- Distance: 38 laps / 74.784 miles
- Race weather: 60 °F, Sunny skies
- Television: Speed (November 9, 2008 - 5:00 p.m. EST)
- Pole position winner: #26 Jonathan Bomarito, 93.286 mph (150.125 km/h)
- Race Summary

The 2008 Imperial Capital Bank Atlantic Challenge of Long Beach was won by the young Swiss driver Simona de Silvestro making her only the second female driver to ever win an Atlantic Championship race after Katherine Legge.

Top Five Finishers
Fin. Pos	St. Pos	Car No.	Driver	Team	Laps	Time	Laps led
1	2	34	(Switzerland) Simona de Silvestro	Newman Wachs Racing	38	50:51.261	15
2	4	17	(United States) Alan Sciuto	Genoa Racing	38	+1.285	0
3	5	25	(Canada) Kevin Lacroix	Walker Racing	38	+2.256	0
4	6	36	(United States) Jonathan Summerton	Newman Wachs Racing	38	+2.983	0
5	1	26	(United States) Jonathan Bomarito	Mathiasen Motorsports	38	+4.605	23
Race average speed:
Lead changes: 1 between 2 drivers
Cautions: 1 for 2 Laps

=== Round 2: Monterey Festival of Speed Atlantic Championship ===
- Sunday May 18, 2008 - 4:00 p.m. EDT
- Mazda Raceway Laguna Seca - Monterey, California
- Time: 50 minutes
- Distance: 34 laps / 76.092 miles
- Race weather: 89 °F, sunny skies
- Television: Speed (November 16, 2008 - 5:00 p.m. EST)
- Pole position winner: #3 James Hinchcliffe, 1:16.189 (105.748 mph)
- Race Summary

Canadian James Hinchciffe took the pole at Laguna Seca with a 1:16.189 which was a track record qualifying run on by an Atlantic car on Saturday after taking the provisional pole on Friday. He then went on to dominate Sunday's race.

Top Five Finishers
Fin. Pos	St. Pos	Car No.	Driver	Team	Laps	Time	Laps Led
1	1	3	(Canada) James Hinchcliffe	Forsythe/Pettit Racing	34	50:50.352	28
2	2	14	(United States) Carl Skerlong	Pacific Coast Motorsports	34	+2.391	6
3	4	6	(Netherlands) Junior Strous	Condor Motorsports	34	+6.671	0
4	5	8	(Finland) Markus Niemelä	Brooks Associates Racing	34	+13.027	0
5	11	9	(Netherlands) Dominick Muermans	Condor Motorsports	34	+18.404	0
Race average speed: 89.803 mph
Lead changes: 2
Cautions: 2 for 9 laps

=== Round 3: Sommet des Legends ===
- Sunday June 29, 2008 - 1:00 p.m. EDT
- Circuit Mont-Tremblant - Mont-Tremblant, Quebec (2.621 mile road circuit)
- Time: 50 minutes
- Distance: 30 laps / 78.630 miles
- Race weather: 75 °F, Partly cloudy skies
- Television: TBA
- Pole position winner: #6 Junior Strous, 1:28.805 (106.251 mph)
- Race Summary

Dutch driver Junior Strous dominated the weekend by taking pole and leading every lap in the race. The win was his first ever in the Atlantic Championship, as was his pole position. He leads the season championship with 74 points over James Hinchcliffe and Markus Niemelä who are tied at 67.

Top Five Finishers
Fin. Pos	St. Pos	Car No.	Driver	Team	Laps	Time	Laps led
1	1	6	(Netherlands) Junior Strous	Condor Motorsports	30	53:50.600	30
2	3	8	(Finland) Markus Niemelä	Brooks Associates Racing	30	+0.487*	0
3	4	14	(United States) Carl Skerlong	Pacific Coast Motorsports	30	+0.966	0
4	5	3	(Canada) James Hinchcliffe	Forsythe Championship Racing	30	+1.514	0
5	8	19	(United States) Dane Cameron	Genoa Racing	30	+2.057	0
					* Race finished under caution		
Race average speed: 87.621 mph
Lead changes: 0
Cautions: 3 for 10 Laps

=== Round 4: Rexall Edmonton Indy Twin Races - Race 1 ===
- Friday July 25, 2008 - 5:15 p.m. MDT
- Rexall Speedway - Edmonton, Alberta (1.973 mile temporary airport circuit)
- Time: 50 minutes
- Distance: 38 laps / 74.974 miles
- Race weather: 80 °F, Partly cloudy skies
- Television: Speed (November 16, 2008 - 5:30 p.m. EST)
- Pole position winner: #3 James Hinchcliffe, 1:05.910 (107.765 mph)
- Race Summary

Polesitter James Hinchcliffe led from the green flag but was closely stalked by Jonathan Bomarito, who finally made the pass in Turn 1 on lap 31. A late race caution set up a one lap sprint to the finish with Bomarito holding off Markus Niemelä to become the fourth race winner in as many races this season. The win was Bomarito's third Atlantic victory and the first victory for his team, Mathiasen Motorsports, in 36 starts. In the points chase, Niemelä leads Hinchcliffe 94-93.

Top Five Finishers
Fin. Pos	St. Pos	Car No.	Driver	Team	Laps	Time	Laps led
1	2	26	(United States) Jonathan Bomarito	Mathiasen Motorsports	38	45:18.942	8
2	5	8	(Finland) Markus Niemelä	Brooks Associates Racing	38	+0.691	0
3	1	3	(Canada) James Hinchcliffe	Forsythe Championship Racing	38	+1.151	30
4	4	19	(United States) Dane Cameron	Genoa Racing	38	+1.757	0
5	6	7	(Mexico) David Garza	Forsythe Championship Racing	38	+2.170	0
Race average speed: 99.269 mph
Lead changes: 1
Cautions: 1 for 3 Laps

=== Round 5: Rexall Edmonton Indy Twin Races - Race 2 ===
- Saturday July 25, 2008 - 12:45 p.m. MDT
- Rexall Speedway - Edmonton, Alberta (1.973 mile temporary airport circuit)
- Time: 50 minutes
- Distance: 36 laps / 71.028 miles
- Race weather: 80 °F, Mostly cloudy skies
- Television: Speed (December 14, 2008 - 5:00 p.m. EST)
- Pole position winner: #14 Carl Skerlong, 1:05.455 (108.514 mph)
- Race Summary

A1 Grand Prix veteran (but Atlantic rookie) Jonathan Summerton jumped into the lead from third on the starting grid and dominated the race, leading every lap on the way to his first Atlantic series win. He became the fifth different winner in five races and the first rookie to top a podium this year. James Hinchcliffe finished third and jumped to the top of the points table. He has 118 points, five more than Markus Niemelä.

Top Five Finishers
Fin. Pos	St. Pos	Car No.	Driver	Team	Laps	Time	Laps led
1	3	36	(United States) Jonathan Summerton	Newman Wachs Racing	18	45:08.751	36
2	1	14	(United States) Carl Skerlong	Pacific Coast Motorsports	18	+2.222	0
3	4	3	(Canada) James Hinchcliffe	Forsythe Championship Racing	18	+6.039	0
4	5	26	(United States) Jonathan Bomarito	Mathiasen Motorsports	18	+6.719	0
5	2	19	(United States) Dane Cameron	Genoa Racing	18	+7.195	0
Race average speed: 94.398 mph
Lead changes: 0
Cautions: 1 for 5 Laps

=== Round 6: Road Race Showcase/Road America - Race 1 ===
- Saturday August 8, 2008 - 1:00 p.m. CDT
- Road America - Elkhart Lake, Wisconsin (4.048 mile permanent road circuit)
- Time: 50 minutes
- Distance: 18 laps / 72.864 miles
- Race weather: 76 °F, Partly cloudy skies
- Television: Speed (December 14, 2008 - 5:30 p.m. EST)
- Pole position winner: #19 Dane Cameron, 1:59.190 (122.265 mph)
- Race Summary

Jonathan Bomarito became the first multiple time winner in the 2008 Atlantic series. He took the lead from pole sitter Dane Cameron at the standing start. On lap 10, Cameron passed Bomarito in Canada Corner but Bomarito was able to pass him back on the following lap, taking the lead which he would hold for the remainder of the race. James Hinchcliffe finished fifth, high enough to keep the points lead with 139 points. Markus Niemelä trails Hinchcliffe by 7 and Bomarito is only 9 points back. Atlantic and Champ Car veteran Tõnis Kasemets made his first appearance since last year's Atlantic round at Road America and finished on the podium in third.

Top Five Finishers
Fin. Pos	St. Pos	Car No.	Driver	Team	Laps	Time	Laps led
1	2	26	(United States) Jonathan Bomarito	Mathiasen Motorsports	18	45:02.334	17
2	1	19	(United States) Dane Cameron	Genoa Racing	18	+0.411	1
3	8	17	(Estonia) Tõnis Kasemets	Genoa Racing	18	+0.978	0
4	9	14	(United States) Carl Skerlong	Pacific Coast Motorsports	18	+6.384	0
5	3	3	(Canada) James Hinchcliffe	Forsythe Championship Racing	18	+7.230	0
Race average speed: 97.068 mph
Lead changes: 1
Cautions: 2 for 6 Laps

=== Round 7: Road Race Showcase/Road America - Race 2 ===
- Sunday August 9, 2008 - 1:30 p.m. CDT
- Road America - Elkhart Lake, Wisconsin (4.048 mile permanent road circuit)
- Time: 50 minutes
- Distance: 20 laps / 80.960 miles
- Race weather: 75 °F, Partly cloudy skies
- Television: Speed (December 21, 2008 - 5:00 p.m. EST)
- Pole position winner: #26 Jonathan Bomarito, 1:59.564 (121.883 mph)
- Race Summary

Race 1's winner Jonathan Bomarito led away from the pole, while behind him Jonathan Summerton was charging up through the field from ninth place on the grid. On lap 18, Summerton passed Bomarito in Turn 1, leading only the final two laps home to the checkered flag. Even with the second place finish Bomarito jumped to the top of the points chase. He leads with 157, three in front of the previous leader James Hinchcliffe and six in front of Markus Niemelä.

Top Five Finishers
Fin. Pos	St. Pos	Car No.	Driver	Team	Laps	Time	Laps led
1	9	36	(United States) Jonathan Summerton	Newman Wachs Racing	20	46:39.544	2
2	1	26	(United States) Jonathan Bomarito	Mathiasen Motorsports	20	+1.084	18
3	2	17	(Estonia) Tõnis Kasemets	Genoa Racing	20	+6.202	0
4	10	25	(Canada) Kevin Lacroix	Walker Racing	20	+6.832	0
5	4	14	(United States) Carl Skerlong	Pacific Coast Motorsports	20	+8.993	0
Race average speed: 104.108 mph
Lead changes: 1
Cautions: 2 for 5 Laps

=== Round 8: Grand Prix de Trois-Rivières ===
- Sunday August 17, 2008 - 1:30 p.m. EDT
- Circuit Trois-Rivières - Trois-Rivières, Quebec (1.521 mile temporary street circuit)
- Time: 50 minutes
- Distance: 44 laps / 66.924 miles
- Race weather: 70 °F, Clear
- Television: Speed (December 21, 2008 - 5:30 p.m. EST)
- Pole position winner: #26 Jonathan Bomarito, 58.989 (92.824 mph)
- Race Summary

Jonathan Bomarito led away from the standing start and was never seriously challenged on his way to his third Atlantic victory of the year. Bad days for James Hinchcliffe and Markus Niemelä allowed him to open a sizable lead in the season championship going into the final three races of the year. Bomarito leads the championship with 191, 28 points ahead of Jonathan Summerton who has 163. Hinchcliffe is still in third, but is 36 points back with 155.

Top Five Finishers
Fin. Pos	St. Pos	Car No.	Driver	Team	Laps	Time	Laps led
1	1	26	(United States) Jonathan Bomarito	Mathiasen Motorsports	44	50:17.453	44
2	2	36	(United States) Jonathan Summerton	Newman Wachs Racing	44	+1.590	0
3	8	6	(Netherlands) Junior Strous	Condor Motorsports	44	+5.682	0
4	11	34	(Switzerland) Simona de Silvestro	Newman Wachs Racing	44	+7.878	0
5	4	19	(United States) Dane Cameron	Genoa Racing	44	+10.015	0
Race average speed: 79.844 mph
Lead changes: 0
Cautions: 2 for 9 Laps

=== Round 9: Mazda Formula Zoom Zoom ===
- Sunday September 14, 2008 - 1:00 p.m. EDT
- New Jersey Motorsports Park - Millville, New Jersey (2.177 mile permanent road circuit)
- Time: 50 minutes
- Distance: 42 laps / 91.434 miles
- Race weather: 86 °F, Clear
- Television: TBA
- Pole position winner: #14 Carl Skerlong, 1:10.211 (111.624 mph)
- Race Summary

Carl Skerlong dominated the weekend, leading every session and leading every lap in the race to claim his first Atlantic victory. He even set the fastest lap, giving him a perfect score of 34 points for the weekend. Points leader Jonathan Bomarito finished ninth, which reduced his margin to 16 points over Jonathan Summerton and 22 over Markus Niemelä with two races left in the season.

Top Five Finishers
Fin. Pos	St. Pos	Car No.	Driver	Team	Laps	Time	Laps led
1	1	14	(United States) Carl Skerlong	Pacific Coast Motorsports	42	50:49.282	42
2	2	8	(Finland) Markus Niemelä	Brooks Associates Racing	42	+2.464	0
3	4	36	(United States) Jonathan Summerton	Newman Wachs Racing	42	+10.441	0
4	3	25	(Canada) Kevin Lacroix	Walker Racing	42	+22.772	0
5	6	6	(Netherlands) Junior Strous	Condor Motorsports	42	+23.914	0
Race average speed: 107.948 mph
Lead changes: 0
Cautions: None

=== Round 10: SunRichGourmet.com 1000 ===
- Sunday September 21, 2008 - 2:30 p.m. MDT
- Miller Motorsports Park - Tooele, Utah (4.486 mile permanent road circuit)
- Time: 50 minutes
- Distance: 20 laps / 89.720 miles
- Race weather: 71 °F, Mostly Cloudy
- Television: Speed (December 28, 2008 - 5:00 p.m. EST)
- Pole position winner: #8 Markus Niemelä, 2:28.915 (108.448 mph)
- Race Summary

Markus Niemelä followed up his first Atlantic series pole position with his first series victory, leading every lap in the race. Three drivers are still alive for the series championship going into the final round of the season. Jonathan Bomarito, who finished sixth, now leads with 224 points. He has an eight point advantage over Jonathan Summerton and a 10 point lead over Niemelä.

Top Five Finishers
Fin. Pos	St. Pos	Car No.	Driver	Team	Laps	Time	Laps led
1	1	8	(Finland) Markus Niemelä	Brooks Associates Racing	20	50:40.529	20
2	2	36	(United States) Jonathan Summerton	Newman Wachs Racing	20	+0.446	0
3	3	19	(United States) Dane Cameron	Genoa Racing	20	+2.296	0
4	6	14	(United States) Carl Skerlong	Pacific Coast Motorsports	20	+2.828	0
5	4	34	(Switzerland) Simona de Silvestro	Newman Wachs Racing	20	+22.363	0
Race average speed: 106.229 mph
Lead changes: 0
Cautions: None

=== Round 11: Atlanta Atlantic Challenge ===
- Friday October 3, 2008 - 2:10 p.m. EDT
- Road Atlanta - Braselton, Georgia (2.540 mile permanent road circuit)
- Time: 50 minutes
- Distance: 35 laps / 88.900 miles
- Race weather: 72 °F, Clear
- Television: Speed (December 28, 2008 - 5:30 p.m. EST)
- Pole position winner: #36 Jonathan Summerton, 1:14.137 (123.339 mph)
- Race Summary

Markus Niemelä won the race and clinched the series championship on an eventful day at Road Atlanta. At the start Dane Cameron took the race lead from the standing start while Niemelä got around the pole sitter Jonathan Summerton for second place. Jonathan Bomarito, the points leader going into the race, dropped out of the race with mechanical troubles after only 10 laps. Going into a restart on lap 33, Niemelä was in second and Summerton was in third, but Summerton was in line to clinch the championship. On the restart, Niemelä got around Cameron to take the lead on the track and Kevin Lacroix passed Summerton for third, which put Niemelä in position to take the championship. Summerton attempted to pass Cameron to put himself back into the championship position but they made contact and both cars were knocked out of the race. Niemelä cruised the final laps under yellow. Niemelä finished the season with 245 points followed by Bomarito at 228 and Summerton with 224.

Top Five Finishers
Fin. Pos	St. Pos	Car No.	Driver	Team	Laps	Time	Laps led
1	3	8	(Finland) Markus Niemelä	Brooks Associates Racing	35	50:19.931	3
2	4	25	(Canada) Kevin Lacroix	Walker Racing	35	+0.730*	0
3	7	3	(Canada) James Hinchcliffe	Forsythe Championship Racing	35	+1.311	0
4	11	34	(Switzerland) Simona de Silvestro	Newman Wachs Racing	35	+1.807	0
5	8	5	(United Kingdom) Greg Mansell	Walker Racing	35	+4.174	0
					* Race finished under caution		
Race average speed: 105.976 mph
Lead changes: 1
Cautions: 2 for 7 Laps

== Final driver results ==
=== Points system ===
Position	1st	2nd	3rd	4th	5th	6th	7th	8th	9th	10th	11th	12th	13th	14th	15th	16th	17th	18th	19th	20th
Points	31	27	25	23	21	19	17	15	13	11	10	9	8	7	6	5	4	3	2	1

Bonus Points

- 1 point to fastest driver in a qualification session.
- 1 point to driver who leads the most laps in the race.
- 1 point to driver who improves the most positions in the race.

Pos	Driver	LBH	LAG	MTT	EDM		ROA		TRR	NJS	UTH	ATL	Points
1	(Finland) Markus Niemelä (R)	7	4	2	2	6	6	6	Ret	2	1*	1	245
2	(United States) Jonathan Bomarito	5*	Ret	6	1	4	1*	2*	1*	9	6	Ret	228
3	(United States) Jonathan Summerton (R)	4	6	12	6	1*	Ret	1	2	3	2	Ret	224
4	(Canada) James Hinchcliffe	10	1*	4	3*	3	5	8	Ret	16	10	3	196
5	(Netherlands) Junior Strous	8	3	1*	13	9	8	11	3	5	8	8	196
6	(United States) Carl Skerlong	23	2	3	19	2	4	5	Ret	1*	4	Inj	189
7	(United States) Dane Cameron (R)	11	17	5	4	5	2	17	5	Ret	3	Ret*	169
8	(Switzerland) Simona de Silvestro	1	10	9	8	Ret	9	18	4	11	5	4	167
9	(Canada) Kevin Lacroix	3	15	13	7	7	14	4	Ret	4	11	2	161
10	(United Kingdom) Greg Mansell (R)	13	Ret	DNS	9	Ret	12	13	9	7	9	5	105
11	(United States) Frankie Muniz	15	13	11	12	13	11	10	12	10	14	9	102
12	(Canada) Daniel Morad (R)	6	9	Ret	11	8	Ret	9	6				95
13	(Mexico) David Garza	12	7	8	5	10	Inj	Inj	Inj	Inj	Inj	6	94
14	(Netherlands) Dominick Muermans (R)	17	5	10	Ret	15	16	16	14	14	17	12	80
15	(United States) Tom Sutherland				10	Ret	Ret	Ret	8	6	7	10	78
16	(Mexico) David Martínez						7	7	7	8	13		74
17	(Finland) Henri Karjalainen (R)	14	16	Ret	14	11	Ret	14	10	15	12		70
18	(Brazil) Douglas Soares (R)	16	14	Ret	15	12	15	15	11	13	15	Ret	70
19	(United Kingdom) Leo Mansell (R)	19	11	Ret	17	Ret	13	Ret	13	12	16	11	68
20	(Venezuela) Luis Schiavo (R)	18	Ret	DNS	16	14	10	12	16			7	60
21	(Estonia) Tõnis Kasemets						3	3					51
22	(Germany) Andreas Wirth	9	8	7									45
23	(United States) Alan Sciuto	2											27
24	(Austria) Christopher Zöchling (R)		12		18	16							18
25	(Canada) Eric Jensen								15	Ret			9
26	(United States) J. R. Hildebrand											Ret	7
27	(United States) Rich Zober (R)									17			4
28	(United States) Brian Thienes	20											1
29	(Canada) Mike Forest	21											0
30	(United States) Greg Minium (R)	22											0
Pos	Driver	LBH	LAG	MTT	EDM		ROA		TRR	NJS	UTH	ATL	Points

Color	Result
Gold	Winner
Silver	2nd place
Bronze	3rd place
Green	4th & 5th place (Top 5)
Light Blue	6th-10th place (Top 10)
Dark Blue	Finished (Outside Top 10)
Purple	Did not finish (Ret)
Red	Did not qualify (DNQ)
Brown	Withdrawn (Wth)
Black	Disqualified (DSQ)
White	Did not start (DNS)
Blank	Did not participate (DNP)
Blank	Driver replacement (Rpl)
Blank	Injured (Inj)
Blank	No race held (NH)

== See also ==
- 2008 Champ Car season (cancelled)
- 2008 Indianapolis 500
- 2008 IndyCar Series season
- 2008 Indy Lights season

Preceded by 2007 Champ Car Atlantic season	2008 Atlantic Championship season	Succeeded by 2009 Atlantic Championship season
