= 2007 Atlantic Championship =

2007 Champ Car Atlantic season
- Cooper Tires Presents the Champ Car Atlantic Championship Powered by Mazda

Season
- Races: 12
- Start date: April 8
- End date: August 12

Awards
- Drivers' champion: (Brazil) Raphael Matos

The 2007 Champ Car Atlantic Season was the thirty-third Champ Car Atlantic season, its sixth season as the prime feeder series for the Champ Car World Series. It began on April 8, 2007, and ended on August 12 after 12 races. The champion was Raphael Matos driving for Sierra Sierra Enterprises.

== Teams and drivers ==
The following teams and drivers competed in the 2007 Champ Car Atlantic season. All teams used the Swift 016.a chassis powered by a Mazda-Cosworth 2.3 liter inline-4 engine and Cooper tires.

Team	No	Drivers	Rounds
(Canada) Jensen MotorSport	2	(United States) Tom Sutherland	All
(Canada) Jensen MotorSport	13	(United States) Frankie Muniz	All
(Canada) Jensen MotorSport	22	(Netherlands) Dominick Muermans	1–2
(Canada) Jensen MotorSport	22	(United States) Steve Ott	11
(United States) Red Bull Team Forsythe	3	(Canada) Robert Wickens	All
(United States) Red Bull Team Forsythe	7	(United States) John Edwards	All
(United States) US RaceTronics	4	(Mexico) David Garza	All
(United States) US RaceTronics	24	(United States) Carl Skerlong	All
(United States) Walker Racing	5	(Switzerland) Simona de Silvestro	All
(United States) Walker Racing	15	(United Kingdom) Ryan Lewis	4–12
(United States) Sierra Sierra Enterprises	6	(Brazil) Raphael Matos	All
(United States) Sierra Sierra Enterprises	9	(Canada) James Hinchcliffe	All
(United States) Brooks Associates Racing	8	(China) Jiang Tengyi	1–3
(United States) Brooks Associates Racing	10	(United States) Joe D'Agostino	2–3
(United States) Brooks Associates Racing	10	(Canada) Kevin Lacroix	4–10, 12
(United States) Brooks Associates Racing	10	(Denmark) Ronnie Bremer	11
(United States) Condor Motorsports	11	(France) Franck Perera	All
(United States) Condor Motorsports	16	(Netherlands) Junior Strous	All
(United States) Condor Motorsports	19	(United States) Brian Thienes	All
(United States) Polestar Racing Group	12	(Denmark) Ronnie Bremer	1–6
(United States) Polestar Racing Group	21	(United States) Bret MacDonald	1–6
(United States) Genoa Racing	17	(United States) Adrian Carrio	All
(United States) Genoa Racing	37	(United States) Richard Heistand	1–7, 9–12
(United States) Conquest Racing	18	(Italy) Giacomo Ricci	All
(United States) Conquest Racing	44	(United States) Matt Lee	All
(United States) Alan Sciuto Racing	20	(United States) Alan Sciuto	All
(United States) PR1 Motorsports	23	(United States) Jonathan Bomarito	All
(United States) PR1 Motorsports	32	(Canada) Mike Forest	All
(United States) Mathiasen Motorsports	26	(United States) Justin Sofio	All
(United States) Gelles Racing	30	(Brazil) Luis Mussi	2–3
(United States) Newman Wachs Racing	34	(Estonia) Tõnis Kasemets	12
(United States) Newman Wachs Racing	36	(United States) J. R. Hildebrand	All
(United States) Paladin Motorsports	45	(Canada) Adrien Herberts	2–10
(United States) Paladin Motorsports	45	(Switzerland) Natacha Gachnang	11
(United States) The Room Store	49	(United States) Dan Selznick	1–2, 4–5

== Schedule ==
Rd	Date	Race name	Track	Location
1	April 8	(United States) Vegas Atlantic Grand Prix	Streets of Las Vegas	Las Vegas, Nevada
2	April 15	(United States) Imperial Capital Bank Grand Prix of Long Beach	Streets of Long Beach	Long Beach, California
3	April 22	(United States) Fast Trac 100 at the Grand Prix of Houston	JAGFlo Speedway at Reliant Park	Houston, Texas
4	June 9	(United States) Atlantic Grand Prix of Portland	Portland International Raceway	Portland, Oregon
5	June 10	(United States) Atlantic Grand Prix of Portland	Portland International Raceway	Portland, Oregon
6	June 24	(United States) Atlantic Grand Prix of Cleveland	Burke Lakefront Airport	Cleveland, Ohio
7	July 1	(Canada) Atlantic Grand Prix of Mont-Tremblant	Circuit Mont-Tremblant	Saint-Jovite, Quebec
8	July 8	(Canada) Steelback Atlantic Grand Prix	Exhibition Place	Toronto, Ontario
9	July 21	(Canada) Atlantic Grand Prix of Edmonton	Edmonton City Centre Airport	Edmonton, Alberta
10	July 22	(Canada) Atlantic Grand Prix of Edmonton	Edmonton City Centre Airport	Edmonton, Alberta
11	July 29	(United States) Atlantic Grand Prix of San Jose	Streets of San Jose	San Jose, California
12	August 12	(United States) Generac Atlantic Grand Prix	Road America	Elkhart Lake, Wisconsin

The Denver Grand Prix was cancelled by Champ Car

== Race results ==
Rd	Track	Pole Position	Fastest Lap	Race winner	
Rd	Track	Pole Position	Fastest Lap	Driver	Team
1	Streets of Las Vegas	(Canada) Robert Wickens	(Canada) Robert Wickens	(Brazil) Raphael Matos	(United States) Sierra Sierra Enterprises
2	Streets of Long Beach	(Brazil) Raphael Matos	(Brazil) Raphael Matos	(Brazil) Raphael Matos	(United States) Sierra Sierra Enterprises
3	JAGFlo Speedway at Reliant Park	(Brazil) Raphael Matos	(United States) Carl Skerlong	(Brazil) Raphael Matos	(United States) Sierra Sierra Enterprises
4	Portland International Raceway	(Canada) James Hinchcliffe	(United States) Jonathan Bomarito	(Canada) Robert Wickens	(United States) Forsythe Racing
5	Portland International Raceway	(Canada) James Hinchcliffe	(Canada) James Hinchcliffe	(Canada) Kevin Lacroix	(United States) Brooks Associates Racing
6	Burke Lakefront Airport	(Brazil) Raphael Matos	(Canada) James Hinchcliffe	(Brazil) Raphael Matos	(United States) Sierra Sierra Enterprises
7	Circuit Mont-Tremblant	(France) Franck Perera	(United States) Carl Skerlong	(France) Franck Perera	(United States) Condor Motorsports
8	Exhibition Place	(Brazil) Raphael Matos	(France) Franck Perera	(France) Franck Perera	(United States) Condor Motorsports
9	Edmonton City Centre Airport	(Canada) James Hinchcliffe	(France) Franck Perera	(Brazil) Raphael Matos	(United States) Sierra Sierra Enterprises
10	Edmonton City Centre Airport	(Brazil) Raphael Matos	(United States) Alan Sciuto	(Brazil) Raphael Matos	(United States) Sierra Sierra Enterprises
11	Streets of San Jose	(United States) Jonathan Bomarito	(Canada) Robert Wickens	(United States) Jonathan Bomarito	(United States) PR1 Motorsports
12	Road America	(France) Franck Perera	(United States) Alan Sciuto	(France) Franck Perera	(United States) Condor Motorsports

== Championship standings ==
=== Drivers' Championship ===
Scoring system

Position	**1st**	**2nd**	**3rd**	**4th**	**5th**	**6th**	**7th**	**8th**	**9th**	**10th**	**11th**	**12th**	**13th**	**14th**	**15th**	**16th**	**17th**	**18th**	**19th**	**20th**
Points	31	27	25	23	21	19	17	15	13	11	10	9	8	7	6	5	4	3	2	1

- The fastest driver in each qualifying session was awarded one additional point.
- The driver who set the fastest lap in a race was awarded one additional point
- The driver that gained the most positions from his starting spot was awarded one additional point.

Pos	Driver	LVG	LBH	HOU	POR		CLE	MTT	TOR	EDM		SAN	ROA	Points
1	(Brazil) Raphael Matos	1	**1**	**1**	4	6	**1**	2	**3**	1	**1**	4	2	341
2	(France) Franck Perera RY	5	5	5	5	3	3	**1**	1	2	3	2	**1**	310
3	(Canada) Robert Wickens R	**2**	3	10	1	4	5	5	7	4	10	3	7	255
4	(Canada) James Hinchcliffe	4	7	3	**2**	**2**	6	3	Ret	**3**	9	Ret	14	224
5	(United States) Jonathan Bomarito	3	2	4	24	7	Ret	4	Ret	14	2	1	4	207
6	(Italy) Giacomo Ricci R	Ret	6	8	11	12	4	6	4	5	6	Ret	5	188
7	(United States) J. R. Hildebrand R	Ret	Ret	7	6	9	2	9	Ret	Ret	5	15	9	140
8	(United States) Alan Sciuto	7	Ret	6	7	Ret	9	12	6	Ret	4	7	20	140
9	(United States) John Edwards R	Ret	4	12	21	Ret	19	11	2	6	8	Ret	8	125
10	(United States) Carl Skerlong R	Ret	9	2	8	11	12	19	Ret	Ret	Ret	17	3	114
11	(United States) Justin Sofio	9	10	11	14	18	10	14	8	10	19	8	15	112
12	(United Kingdom) Ryan Lewis				3	5	Ret	13	5	9	13	Ret	10	107
13	(Canada) Kevin Lacroix R				15	1	14	8	Ret	18	7		6	105
14	(Netherlands) Junior Strous R	6	13	DNS	9	8	13	Ret	Ret	DNS	DNS	5	Ret	92
15	(Denmark) Ronnie Bremer	8	8	9	10	13	7					9		92
16	(United States) Matt Lee R	10	11	17	19	15	18	10	Ret	12	12	Ret	12	79
17	(Mexico) David Garza R	Ret	24	14	12	10	8	15	10	8	20	18	Ret	78
18	(United States) Adrian Carrio R	Ret	12	13	17	Ret	Ret	16	Ret	7	DSQ	6	11	77
19	(Switzerland) Simona de Silvestro R	Ret	Ret	15	16	16	11	7	Ret	13	Ret	10	22	69
20	(Canada) Adrien Herberts R		15	19	13	14	Ret	17	Ret	11	15			51
21	(United States) Tom Sutherland R	Ret	14	Ret	Ret	17	15	Ret	Ret	Ret	14	13	16	43
22	(United States) Frankie Muniz R	Ret	19	21	22	20	Ret	Ret	9	17	16	11	18	41
23	(Canada) Mike Forest R	11	18	18	18	19	Ret	18	Ret	Ret	17	16	13	41
24	(United States) Brian Thienes R	12	17	23	20	21	17	20	Ret	15	18	14	19	38
25	(United States) Richard Heistand R	Ret	Ret	Ret	Ret	Ret	16	Ret		16	11	12	21	29
26	(Brazil) Luis Mussi R		20	16										6
27	(United States) Joe D'Agostino		16	20										6
28	(Netherlands) Dominick Muermans R	Ret	22											5
29	(Estonia) Tõnis Kasemets												17	4
30	(United States) Dan Selznick	Ret	Ret		Ret	24								2
31	(United States) Bret McDonald R	Ret	21	Ret	23	22	20							2
32	(China) Jiang Tengyi R	Ret	23	22										0
33	(United States) Steve Ott R											Ret		0
34	(Switzerland) Natacha Gachnang R											DNS		0
Pos	Driver	LVG	LBH	HOU	POR		CLE	MTT	TOR	EDM		SAN	ROA	Points

Color	Result
Gold	Winner
Silver	2nd place
Bronze	3rd place
Green	4th & 5th place
Light Blue	6th–10th place
Dark Blue	Finished (Outside Top 10)
Purple	Did not finish
Red	Did not qualify (DNQ)
Brown	Withdrawn (Wth)
Black	Disqualified (DSQ)
White	Did not start (DNS)
Blank	Did not participate (DNP)
Blank	Not competing

**In-line notation**
**Bold**	Pole position (1 point)
Italics	Ran fastest race lap
*	Led race laps
↑	Improved the most places
R	Rookie
RY	Rookie of the Year

== See also ==
- 2007 Champ Car season
- 2007 Indianapolis 500
- 2007 IndyCar Series season
- 2007 Indy Pro Series season

Preceded by 2006 Champ Car Atlantic season	2007 Champ Car Atlantic season	Succeeded by 2008 Atlantic Championship season
