= 2004 Formula BMW USA season =

Seasons
- ← none 2005 →

The 2004 Formula BMW USA season was the inaugural season of the American Formula BMW championship for young drivers making the transition to car racing. The Overall Championship was won by Andreas Wirth as the Rookie Cup was won by James Hinchcliffe.

== Teams and drivers ==
All cars were Mygale FB02 chassis powered by BMW engines.

Team	No	Driver	Class	Rounds
(United States) HBR Motorsport USA	2	(United States) Jonathan Summerton	R	All
(United States) HBR Motorsport USA	8	(Germany) Andreas Wirth		All
(United States) Vitesse Farm Racing	3	(United States) Graham Rahal	R	All
(Canada) Jensen MotorSport	4	(United States) Daniel Herrington	R	2, 4
(Canada) Jensen MotorSport	14	(United States) Morgan Spurgas		3
(Canada) Jensen MotorSport		(United States) Gerardo Bonilla		1
(Canada) Jensen MotorSport		(United States) Robbie Montinola		5, 7
(Canada) Jensen MotorSport		(United States) Alan Sciuto	R	1
(Canada) Team Autotecnica	5	(United States) Matt Jaskol		All
(Canada) Team Autotecnica	15	(United States) Alexis Fenton	R	All
(United States) Team PTG Motorsport	7	(United States) Tom Sutherland	R	All
(United States) Team PTG Motorsport	10	(United States) Lawson Aschenbach		2–7
(United States) Team PTG Motorsport	16	(United States) Tommy Milner	R	All
(United States) Team PTG Motorsport	71	(United States) Billy Johnson		All
(United States) Team PTG Motorsport		(United States) Joey Hand		1
(Canada) Atlantic Racing Team	9	(Canada) Trevor Daley	R	1–3
(Canada) Atlantic Racing Team	12	(Colombia) Federico Montoya	R	2–3
(Canada) Atlantic Racing Team	13	(Canada) Kyle Herder		1–3, 5–7
(Canada) Atlantic Racing Team	19	(United Kingdom) Dominik Jackson		2–3
(Canada) Atlantic Racing Team	48	(United States) Brian Frisselle		1–3
(Canada) Atlantic Racing Team	98	(United States) Derek Burseth	R	1–3
(Switzerland) PoleVision Racing	48	(United States) Brian Frisselle		4–7
(Switzerland) PoleVision Racing	98	(United States) Derek Burseth	R	4–7
(Canada) AIM Motorsport	56	(Canada) James Hinchcliffe	R	All

Icon	Class
R	Rookie Cup

== Races ==
Round		Circuit	Date	Pole position	Fastest lap	Winning driver	Winning team	Winning rookie
1	R1	(United States) Lime Rock Park	29 May	(United States) Matt Jaskol	(United States) Matt Jaskol	(Germany) Andreas Wirth	(United States) HBR Motorsport USA	(Canada) James Hinchcliffe
1	R2	(United States) Lime Rock Park	31 May	(United States) Matt Jaskol	no data	(Germany) Andreas Wirth	(United States) HBR Motorsport USA	(Canada) James Hinchcliffe
2	R1	(Canada) Circuit Gilles Villeneuve	12 June	(Canada) James Hinchcliffe	(Germany) Andreas Wirth	(United States) Jonathan Summerton	(United States) HBR Motorsport USA	(United States) Jonathan Summerton
2	R2	(Canada) Circuit Gilles Villeneuve	13 June	(Canada) James Hinchcliffe	(United States) Jonathan Summerton	(United States) Matt Jaskol	(Canada) Team Autotecnica	(Canada) James Hinchcliffe
3	R1	(United States) Indianapolis Motor Speedway	19 June	(United States) Jonathan Summerton	(United States) Jonathan Summerton	(United States) Jonathan Summerton	(United States) HBR Motorsport USA	(United States) Jonathan Summerton
3	R2	(United States) Indianapolis Motor Speedway	20 June	(United States) Jonathan Summerton	(United States) Matt Jaskol	(United States) Matt Jaskol	(Canada) Team Autotecnica	(Canada) James Hinchcliffe
4	R1	(United States) Cleveland Burke Lakefront Airport	2 July	(United States) Tommy Milner	(Germany) Andreas Wirth	(United States) Jonathan Summerton	(United States) HBR Motorsport USA	(United States) Jonathan Summerton
4	R2	(United States) Cleveland Burke Lakefront Airport	3 July	(United States) Jonathan Summerton	(United States) Tommy Milner	(United States) Jonathan Summerton	(United States) HBR Motorsport USA	(United States) Jonathan Summerton
5	R1	(United States) Road America	7 August	(Canada) James Hinchcliffe	(Germany) Andreas Wirth	(Germany) Andreas Wirth	(United States) HBR Motorsport USA	(United States) Graham Rahal
5	R2	(United States) Road America	8 August	(United States) Jonathan Summerton	(United States) Jonathan Summerton	(Canada) James Hinchcliffe	(Canada) AIM Motorsport	(Canada) James Hinchcliffe
6	R1	(United States) Denver	14 August	(Germany) Andreas Wirth	(Germany) Andreas Wirth	(Canada) James Hinchcliffe	(Canada) AIM Motorsport	(Canada) James Hinchcliffe
6	R2	(United States) Denver	15 August	(Canada) James Hinchcliffe	(Germany) Andreas Wirth	(Canada) James Hinchcliffe	(Canada) AIM Motorsport	(Canada) James Hinchcliffe
7	R1	(United States) Mazda Raceway Laguna Seca	11 September	(Germany) Andreas Wirth	(United States) Matt Jaskol	(Germany) Andreas Wirth	(United States) HBR Motorsport USA	(United States) Jonathan Summerton
7	R2	(United States) Mazda Raceway Laguna Seca	12 September	(United States) Matt Jaskol	(United States) Matt Jaskol	(United States) Matt Jaskol	(Canada) Team Autotecnica	(United States) Jonathan Summerton

== Standings ==
Points were awarded as follows:

Position	**1st**	**2nd**	**3rd**	**4th**	**5th**	**6th**	**7th**	**8th**	**9th**	**10th**
Points	20	15	12	10	8	6	4	3	2	1

=== Drivers' Championship ===
Pos	Driver	LIM (United States)		CGV (Canada)		IMS (United States)		CLE (United States)		ROA (United States)		DEN (United States)		LAG (United States)		Pts
1	(Germany) Andreas Wirth	1	1	5	3	2	2	4	2	1	3	**3**	4	**1**	3	201
2	(Canada) James Hinchcliffe	2	5	**2**	**2**	4	3	2	3	**Ret**	1	1	**1**	3	11	174
3	(United States) Jonathan Summerton	4	15	1	5	**1**	**4**	1	**1**	12†	**2**	5	9	2	2	163
4	(United States) Matt Jaskol	**12**	**2**	3	1	15†	1	3	Ret	3	4	2	2	4	**1**	161
5	(United States) Billy Johnson	5	6	6	4	5	5	7	7	5	5	8	7	5	8	88
6	(United States) Brian Frisselle	6	3	14	WD	10	6	6	4	2	6	10	11	8	9	68
7	(United States) Graham Rahal	10	12	12	Ret	9	10	8	6	4	7	4	3	6	5	63
8	(United States) Tommy Milner	8	8	8	7	6	12	**5**	5	Ret	9	6	6	11	10	50
9	(United States) Lawson Aschenbach			16	6	8	11	9	9	6	8	7	5	Ret	4	44
10	(Canada) Kyle Herder	15	11	4	8	12	8			8	11	9	8	7	6	34
11	(United States) Joey Hand	3	4													22
12	(United Kingdom) Dominik Jackson			7	9	3	9									20
13	(United States) Tom Sutherland	13	13	11	10	11	13	10	8	7	14	11	10	10	7	15
14	(Colombia) Federico Montoya			9	Ret	7	7									10
15	(United States) Gerardo Bonilla	7	7													8
16	(United States) Robbie Montinola									9	10			9	12	5
17	(Canada) Trevor Daley	9	9	Ret	WD	Ret	14									4
18	(United States) Daniel Herrington			10	Ret			Ret	10							2
19	(United States) Derek Burseth	14	16	13	12	Ret	16	Ret	11	10	13	13	13	13	14	1
20	(United States) Alan Sciuto	11	10													1
21	(United States) Alexis Fenton	16	14	15	11	13	15	Ret	Ret	11†	12	12	12	12	13	0
22	(United States) Morgan Spurgas					14	17									0
Pos	Driver	LIM (United States)		CGV (Canada)		IMS (United States)		CLE (United States)		ROA (United States)		DEN (United States)		LAG (United States)		Pts

Colour	Result
Gold	Winner
Silver	Second place
Bronze	Third place
Green	Points classification
Blue	Non-points classification
Blue	Non-classified finish (NC)
Purple	Retired, not classified (Ret)
Red	Did not qualify (DNQ)
Red	Did not pre-qualify (DNPQ)
Black	Disqualified (DSQ)
White	Did not start (DNS)
White	Withdrew (WD)
White	Race cancelled (C)
Blank	Did not practice (DNP)
Blank	Did not arrive (DNA)
Blank	Excluded (EX)

**Bold** – Pole
Italics – Fastest Lap

=== Rookie Cup ===
Pos	Driver	LIM (United States)		CGV (Canada)		IMS (United States)		CLE (United States)		ROA (United States)		DEN (United States)		LAG (United States)		Pts
1	(Canada) James Hinchcliffe	1	1	2	1	2	1	2	2	Ret	1	1	1	2	5	223
2	(United States) Jonathan Summerton	2	8	1	2	1	2	1	1	5†	2	3	4	1	1	213
3	(United States) Graham Rahal	5	5	7	Ret	5	4	4	4	1	3	2	2	3	2	147
4	(United States) Tommy Milner	3	2	3	3	3	5	3	3	Ret	4	4	3	5	4	145
5	(United States) Tom Sutherland	7	6	6	4	6	6	5	5	2	7	5	5	4	3	111
6	(United States) Alexis Fenton	9	7	9	5	7	8	Ret	Ret	4†	5	6	6	6	6	65
7	(United States) Derek Burseth	8	9	8	6	Ret	9	Ret	7	3	6	7	7	7	7	54
8	(Colombia) Federico Montoya			4	Ret	4	3									32
9	(Canada) Trevor Daley	4	3	Ret	WD	Ret	7									26
10	(United States) Alan Sciuto	6	4													16
11	(United States) Daniel Herrington			5	Ret			Ret	6							14
