= Jensen MotorSport =

Auto racing team

Jensen MotorSport is an auto racing team that competes in the Formula Regional Americas Championship. It formerly competed in the Firestone Indy Lights series, Champ Car Atlantic Championship, the Formula BMW Americas Championship, and fielded a car for one Champ Car World Series race. It is owned by former Atlantics competitor Eric Jensen.

== Early years ==
The team ran in Indy Lights and Atlantic competition in the late 1990s with Eric Jensen driving with sponsorship from Columbia TriStar Films, Colgate-Palmolive, Sony PlayStation, Miller Brewing, and Starwood Hotels (Westin & Sheraton brands). In 1999, Eric Jensen formed Jensen MotorSport, Inc. and since 2003, the team has trained and operated race cars for more than 100 professional race car drivers. Jensen MotorSport also provides marketing services to corporate partners and hosts events at professional races worldwide.

== 2000's ==
In 2015, Jensen began operating race cars for drivers other than himself, entering two cars in the CART Toyota Atlantic championship for drivers Jensen and Phil Fayer. In 2004, the team expanded to also operate race cars in the first year Formula BMW USA championship. A Jensen MotorSport car driven by Gerardo Bonilla qualified 2nd for the first ever Formula BMW USA race. The team operated race cars for drivers in the 2004 season including Alan Sciuto, Daniel Herrington, Eric Jensen, Adam Pecorari. In 2005, Jensen MotorSport competed in its first Champ Car World Series event at the Long Beach Grand Prix with Italian driver Fabrizio del Monte. The team also competed in the Champ Car Atlantic championship with drivers Adam Pecorari, Eric Jensen, and Leonardo Maia. Jensen MotorSport also operated a four car team in the Formula BMW USA championship with drivers Daniel Herrington, Doug Boyer, John Zartarian, and Jules Duc.

In 2006, Jensen MotorSport competed in the Champ Car Atlantic championship with drivers Tim Bridgman and Steve Ott. Jensen MotorSport also operated a two car team in the Formula BMW USA championship for drivers Tom Sutherland and Frankie Muniz. Muniz was already a well known celebrity, having starred in the FOX television show Malcolm in the Middle, and contracted Jensen MotorSport for development as a professional race car driver over a 2-year term.

In 2007, Jensen MotorSport again competed in the Champ Car Atlantic series with 3 cars for Muniz, Tom Sutherland, and Dominick Muermans. Sutherland finished 21st in points with a best finish of 13th. Muniz finished 22nd with a best finish of ninth at Toronto. Muermans only competed in the first two rounds of the championship.

In 2008, the Champ Car World Series merged with the IndyCar Series. Jensen MotorSport continued in the Atlantic Championship with one car for Finnish driver Henri Karjalainen, who finished 17th in points with a best finish of 10th at Circuit Trois-Rivières.

In 2009, Jensen MotorSport operated two cars in the Atlantic Championship with drivers including 2008 series champion Markus Niemelä, Matt Lee, and Davíd Garza Pérez. Niemelä finished sixth in points, making seven starts with the team after driving in the first five races for Newman Wachs Racing. Jensen MotorSport returned to full-time competition in the Formula BMW Americas championship with American driver Barrett Mertens. The company also was contracted by Dipdive Network to shoot a series of videos with music group Black Eyed Peas. Team owner Eric Jensen was awarded the Team Owner of the Year award at the end of season Atlantic Championship banquet.

In 2010, Atlantic Championship ownership put the series on hiatus in March 2010.

Jensen MotorSport announced in November 2010 that it would enter multiple cars in the Firestone Indy Lights championship in 2011 with Canadian David Ostella driving one car in a partnership with Dipdive Network. Mexican Juan Pablo García was signed to drive the second car. Ostella finished ninth in points with a best finish of fourth in the season opener at St. Petersburg. García drove in the first four races of the season before leaving the team with a best finish of eighth. Team owner Eric Jensen attempted to drive in the Toronto race but was unable to run competitive practice speeds after several years out of the cockpit and did not start the race. British driver Oliver Webb made four starts later in the season for the team and finished on the podium in third in his first start at Edmonton. Webb finished 18th in points. Jensen MotorSport also announced Driver Development initiatives to train young race car drivers.

The team is based in Toronto, Ontario, Canada; with locations in Montreal, Quebec and Orlando, Florida, United States.
