= John Edwards (racing driver) =

American racing driver (born 1991)

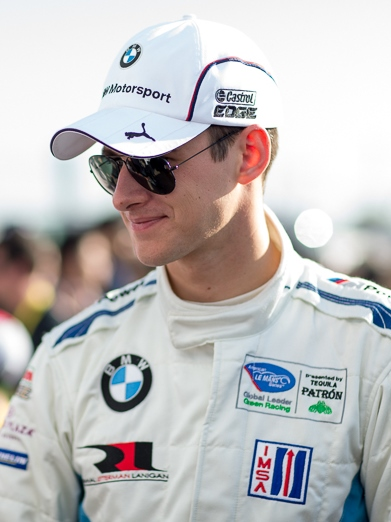
- Nationality: (United States) American
- Born: John Michael Edwards; March 11, 1991 (age 35) Louisville, Kentucky, U.S.

International Motor Sports Association (IMSA) career
- Current team: Turner Motorsport
- Categorisation: FIA Gold (until 2017, 2027–); FIA Platinum (2018–2026)
- Car number: 95
- Former teams: Stevenson Motorsports, Fall-Line Motorsports, Newman Wachs Racing
- Starts: 40 (Rolex), 42 (Continental), 5 (ALMS), 22 (United SportsCar)
- Wins: 7 (Rolex), 7 (Continental), 1 (ALMS), 1 (United SportsCar)

Previous series
- 2007, 09 2008 2006 2005–06 2005: Atlantic Championship; Star Mazda; Formula Renault NEC; Formula Renault Eurocup; Formula Renault Germany

Championship titles
- 2009 2008: Atlantic Championship; Star Mazda

John Michael Edwards (born March 11, 1991) is an American professional racing driver, and BMW Motorsport works driver.

== Career ==
Edwards began racing cars at the young age of 12 in 2003 in the Skip Barber Series. To the best of his knowledge, he became the youngest open wheel racing driver in history, taking his first win at Daytona International Speedway at 12 years and 238 days of age.

In 2005, Edwards went to Europe to compete first in Italian Karting and then after an unexpected early promotion to the world of European motor racing at the age of 14; he was the youngest to ever hold a FIA racing license racing in Formula Renault 2000 Eurocup and Formula Renault 2.0 Germany. He finished 16th in Eurocup in 2006 and fifth with a win at Anderstorp. In 2007, he returned to the United States and drove in the Atlantic Championship and finished ninth in points for Forsythe Championship Racing with a second at Toronto.

In 2008, Edwards stepped back on the US racing ladder where he won the championship of the Star Mazda Series in spite of missing the first race of the season. He returned to Atlantics for the 2009 season driving for Newman Wachs Racing. He captured four wins and three poles on his way to the championship. He won the championship over Jonathan Summerton and Simona de Silvestro, second and third in the 2009 Atlantic Championship season.

For 2010, Edwards transitioned to sports cars to join the Mazda factory team and Speed Source, racing in the Rolex Sports Car Series GT class with co-driver Adam Christodoulou. His 2010 highlights included a GT class win in the Grand-Am race at Lime Rock. Also in 2010, driving along co-drivers Michael Auriemma and Michael Edwards, he secured two Nürburgring VLN Class wins for Schubert Motorsports.

For 2011, Edwards joined for Stevenson Motorsports in the Grand-Am Continental GS series. Partnered with Matt Bell, they secured wins at Laguna Seca and Road America. That same year, he also raced a partial season with Team Sahlen in the Grand-Am GT series, taking the Mazda to the podium several times with co-driver Wayne Nonnamaker.

For 2012, Edwards once again drove with Stevenson Motorsports in both the Grand-Am Continental GS and GT series. At the beginning of the season, he suffered an off track anterior cruciate ligament injury and missed the first two races of the season. He returned to achieve four pole positions in GT qualifying in the remaining nine races. After a series of podium finishes in GT, he and his teammate Robin Liddell secured victories at Watkins Glen and Lime Rock. He and Matt Bell also had a win at Laguna Seca in the GS series.

In 2013, Edwards returned with Stevenson Motorsports, finishing third in the Rolex Sports Car Series GT class with Robin Liddell and second in the Continental Tire Sports Car Challenge GS class with Matt Bell. In early 2013, Edwards also joined BMW Team Rahal Letterman Lanigan Racing part-time, subbing for Joey Hand in the American Le Mans Series GT class, driving the BMW Z4 GTE. He and Dirk Müller achieved one win among four podiums.

For the 2014 season, Edwards was picked up full-time by BMW, teaming with Dirk Müller to finish seventh in the Tudor United SportsCar Championship GTLM class. He also joined Fall-Line Motorsports in the Continental Tire Sports Car Challenge GS class, teaming with Trent Hindman to win the team championship.

Edward returned to BMW Rahal Letterman Lanigan Racing in 2015 and 2016 as a BMW Factory driver in the TUDOR United SportsCar Championship to compete in the GTLM class with co-driver Lucas Luhr. After a strong drive, Edwards and Luhr won at Mazda Raceway Laguna Seca, as well as podium finishes at Canadian Tire Motorsports Park and Petit Le Mans at Road Atlanta. The 2016 season saw tough challenges for the Rahal Letterman Team as the development of the M6 BMW continued with Edwards and teammates securing a solitary podium.

For 2017, Edwards drove for BMW for his sixth year teamed with Martin Tomczyk, a seasoned veteran having raced in DTM for 16 seasons and was the DTM Champion in 2011. The pair was joined by Kuno Wittmer and Nicky Catsburg for the endurance events. He and Tomczyk won Laguna Seca 2018.

For 2018, Edwards drove for BMW for his seventh consecutive year teamed with Jesse Krohn and joined by Augusto Farfus and Nicky Catsburg for the endurance events. Highlights were limited to podiums and two poles for Edwards driving the new BMW M8.

For 2019, Edwards was once again paired with Jesse Krohn in the United Sportscar Championship. The pair would be joined with Alex Zanardi and Colton Herta for the endurance events beginning with the 24 hours of Daytona. Edwards would also race the 24 hour races at the Nürburgring and Spa-Francorchamps. Edwards, Nicky Catsburg, and Marco Wittmann began the year with strong start racing for Rowe Racing with a victory at the first VLN at the Nurburgring.

2023 saw Edwards embark upon a customer-focused campaign, pairing ST Racing's Samantha Tan in the Pro-Am class of the 2023 GT World Challenge America. Edwards stated that a number of factors contributed to his decision to join the program, including the sprint race focus of the series. Furthermore, he appreciated the developmental role that he undertook, advising the team as their delegated factory driver.

== Motorsports career results ==
=== Complete Eurocup Formula Renault 2.0 results ===
(key) (Races in bold indicate pole position; races in italics indicate fastest lap)

Year	Entrant	1	2	3	4	5	6	7	8	9	10	11	12	13	14	15	16	DC	Points
2005	Motopark Academy	ZOL; 1	ZOL; 2	VAL; 1; 29	VAL; 2; 27	LMS; 1	LMS; 2	BIL; 1; 19	BIL; 2; 13	OSC; 1; 19	OSC; 2; 20	DON; 1; 15	DON; 2 Ret	EST; 1; 24	EST; 2 DNS	MNZ; 1; 13	MNZ; 2; 14	35th	0
2006	Motorsport Arena	ZOL; 1 Ret	ZOL; 2; 16	IST; 1; 7	IST; 2 Ret	MIS; 1 Ret	MIS; 2; 18	NÜR; 1; 9	NÜR; 2; 10	DON; 1; 6	DON; 2; 13	LMS; 1 Ret	LMS; 2 DNS	CAT; 1; 21	CAT; 2 Ret			17th	14

=== Complete Formula Renault 2.0 NEC results ===
(key) (Races in bold indicate pole position) (Races in italics indicate fastest lap)

Year	Entrant	1	2	3	4	5	6	7	8	9	10	11	12	13	14	15	16	DC	Points
2006	Motorsport Arena	OSC; 1; 8	OSC; 2; 4	SPA; 1; 2	SPA; 2 DNS	NÜR; 1; 3	NÜR; 2; 7	ZAN; 1; 9	ZAN; 2 Ret	OSC; 1; 6	OSC; 2 Ret	ASS; 1	ASS; 2	AND; 1; 4	AND; 2; 1	SAL; 1; 6	SAL; 2; 14	5th	184

=== American Open-Wheel Racing Results ===
(key) (Races in bold indicate pole position) (Races in italics indicate fastest lap)

==== Atlantic Championship ====
Year	Team	1	2	3	4	5	6	7	8	9	10	11	12	Rank	Points
2007	Red Bull Forsythe Racing	LVG; Ret	LBH; 4	HOU; 12	POR1; 21	POR2; Ret	CLE; 19	MTT; 11	TOR; 2	EDM1; 6	EDM2; 8	SJO; Ret	ROA; 8	**9th**	**125**
2009	Newman Wachs Racing	SEB; 1	UTA; 2	NJ1; 5	NJ2; 6	LIM; 2	ACC1; 1	ACC2; 1	MOH; Ret	TRR; 2	MOS; 2	ATL; 3	LS; 1	**1st**	**182**

==== Star Mazda Championship ====
Year	Team	1	2	3	4	5	6	7	8	9	10	11	12	Rank	Points
2008	AIM Autosport	SEB; NA	UTA; 1	WGI; 6	POR; 26	POR; 1	ROA; 2	TRR; 2	MOS; 4	NJ1; 1	NJ2; 3	ATL; 1	LAG; 2	**1st**	**422**

=== Sports car racing results ===
==== Continental Tire Sports Car Challenge ====
Year	Team	Class	1	2	3	4	5	6	7	8	9	10	11	12	Rank	Points
2010	Freedom Autosport	ST	DIS; 22	HOM	BAR	VIR	WGI	MOH	NJP	TRR	UTA				**90th**	**9**
2011	Stevenson Motorsports	GS	DIS; 28	HMS; 11	BAR; 5	VIR; 9	LRP; 4	WGI; 2	ROA; 1	LS; 1	NJP; 14	MOH; 33			**8th**	**218**
2012	Stevenson Motorsports	GS	DIS; 17	BAR; NA	HMS; NA	NJP; 12	MOH; 5	ROA; 6	WGI; 4	IMS; 8	LS; 1	LRP; 4			**9th**	**198**
2013	Stevenson Motorsports	GS	DIS; 6	COTA; 10	BAR; 2	ATL; 1	MOH; 3	WGI; 6	IMS; 20	ROA; 17	KAS; 1	LS; 2	LRP; 2		**2nd**	**289**
2014	Fall-Line Motorsports	GS	DIS; 2	SEB; 2	LS; 1	LRP; 4	KAS; 22	WGI; 19	MOS; 4	IMS; 2	ROA; 4	VIR; 12	COTA; 1	ATL; 2	**2nd**	**313**

==== Rolex Sports Car Series ====
Year	Team	Class	1	2	3	4	5	6	7	8	9	10	11	12	Rank	Points	Ref
2010	SpeedSource	GT	DIS	HMS; 9	BAR; 5	VIR; 11	LRP; 1	WGI; 5	MOH; 2	NJP; 5	WGI; 6	TRR; 8	UTA; 3		**3rd**	**300**	
2011	SpeedSource	GT	DIS; 6	HMS	BAR	VIR	LRP	WGI; 10							**17th**	**183**	
2011	Team Sahlen	GT							ROA; 2	LS; 14	NJP; 5	WGI; 8	MTL; 6	MOH; 6	**17th**	**183**	
2012	Stevenson Motorsports	GT	DIS; 17	BAR	HMS	NJP; 2	DET; 3	MOH; 3	ROA; 6	IMS; 15	WGI; 14	MTL; 1	LS; 8	LRP; 1	**8th**	**306**	
2013	Stevenson Motorsports	GT	DIS; 15	COTA; 15	BAR; **1**	ATL; 1	DET; 1	MOH; **10**	WGI; **1**	IMS; 2	ROA; 8	KAS; 4	LS; **5**	LRP; 4	**3rd**	**330**	

==== American Le Mans Series ====
Year	Team	Class	1	2	3	4	5	6	7	8	9	10	Rank	Points	Ref
2013	BMW Team RLL	GT	SEB; 7	LBG	LS; 3	LRP; 1	MOS	ROA; 8	BAL	COTA; 3	VIR	ATL; 2	**7th**	**82**	

==== Complete WeatherTech SportsCar Championship results ====
(key) (Races in bold indicate pole position; results in italics indicate fastest lap)

Year	Team	Class	Make	Engine	1	2	3	4	5	6	7	8	9	10	11	Pos.	Points	Ref
2014	BMW Team RLL	GTLM	BMW Z4 GTE	BMW 4.4 L V8	DAY; 4	SEB; 10	LBH; 2	LAG; 10	WGI; 6	MOS; 4	IND; 7	ELK; 2	VIR; 3	COT; 7	PET; 7	7th	300	
2015	BMW Team RLL	GTLM	BMW Z4 GTE	BMW 4.4 L V8	DAY; 4	SEB; 4	LBH; 5	LAG; 1	WGI; 8	MOS; 2	ELK; 6	VIR; 4	COT; 7	PET; 2		5th	291	
2016	BMW Team RLL	GTLM	BMW M6 GTLM	BMW S63 4.4 L Twin Turbo V8	DAY; 11	SEB; 6	LBH; 10	LGA; 10	WGL; 8	MOS; 9	LIM; 9	ELK; 3	VIR; 8	COT; 7	PET; 6	9th	267	
2017	BMW Team RLL	GTLM	BMW M6 GTLM	BMW S63 4.4 L Twin Turbo V8	DAY; 11	SEB; 9	LBH; 7	**COA**; **3**	WGL; 8	MOS; 2	LIM; 3	ELK; 7	VIR; 9	LGA; 1	PET; 9	7th	284	
2018	BMW Team RLL	GTLM	BMW M8 GTE	BMW S63 4.0 L Twin Turbo V8	DAY; 7	SEB; 7	LBH; 5	**MOH**; 7	WGL; 8	MOS; 8	LIM; 8	ELK; 8	VIR; 3	LGA; 4	ATL; 3	8th	278	
2019	BMW Team RLL	GTLM	BMW M8 GTE	BMW S63 4.0 L Twin Turbo V8	DAY; 9	SEB; 4	LBH; 8	MOH; 6	WGL; 5	**MOS**; 2	LIM; 8	ELK; 8	VIR; 8	**LGA**; 2	ATL; 9	7th	279	
2020	BMW Team RLL	GTLM	BMW M8 GTE	BMW S63 4.0 L Twin Turbo V8	DAY; 1	DAY; 6	SEB; 5	ELK; 3	VIR; 6	ATL; 3	MOH; 4	CLT; 2	PET; 3	LGA; 4	SEB; 3	2nd	319	
2021	BMW Team RLL	GTLM	BMW M8 GTE	BMW S63 4.0 L Twin Turbo V8	DAY; 3	SEB; 3	DET	WGL; 2	WGL	LIM	ELK	LGA	LBH	VIR	**PET**; 3	6th	1336	
2022	BMW M Team RLL	GTD Pro	BMW M4 GT3	BMW S58B30T0 3.0 L Twin Turbo I6	DAY; 7	SEB; 10	LBH; 4	LGA; 3	**WGL**; 7	MOS; 5	LIM; 5	ELK; 5	VIR; 5	PET; 4		6th	2872	
2023	Turner Motorsport	GTD Pro	BMW M4 GT3	BMW S58B30T0 3.0 L Twin Turbo I6	DAY; 9	SEB; 7	LBH	LGA	WGL; 7	MOS	LIM	ELK	VIR	IMS	PET	11th	773	

Sporting positions
Preceded by Markus Niemelä	Formula Atlantic Champion; 2009	Succeeded by Incumbent (2010–2011 seasons cancelled)
Preceded by Dane Cameron	Star Mazda Championship Champion; 2008	Succeeded by Adam Christodoulou
Preceded by Ryan Briscoe; Richard Westbrook	Michelin Endurance Cup; GTLM Champion; 2020; With: Jesse Krohn	Succeeded by Nick Tandy; Tommy Milner
