= Alan Sciuto =

- Nationality: (United States) American
- Born: April 23, 1988 (age 38) Orange, California, U.S.
- Retired: 2008

Atlantic Championship
- Years active: 2005-2008
- Teams: Genoa Racing (2008); Alan Sciuto Racing (2007); Polestar Racing Group (2006); PR1 Motorsports (2005)
- Starts: 27
- Wins: 0
- Poles: 1
- Fastest laps: 2
- Best finish: 8th in 2006 and 2007

Previous series
- 2005 2005 2005 2004 2001-2003: USF2000; Star Mazda; Skip Barber National Championship; Formula BMW USA; Karting

Alan Richard Sciuto (born 28 April 1988 in Orange, California) is a former racing driver. Sciuto competed previously in the Atlantic Championship among other series.

== Racing career ==
Sciuto started his racing career in 2001 with the SKUSA organisation. In his first season Sciuto finished 26th in the season standings of the national 80cc Junior class. The Californian won the championship in the following year beating many young prospects such as James Hinchcliffe and Graham Rahal. In 2004 Sciuto finished second in the Stars of Karting shifterkart championship. After a shootout race at Infineon Raceway Sciuto was selected for the Red Bull Junior Team in 2004.

Sciuto made his auto racing debut in the Formula BMW USA at Lime Rock Park in 2004. The following year Sciuto mainly competed in the Skip Barber National Championship after winning the Skip Barber Scholarship. Sciuto scored his first pole position in the series at Road America in the Dodge powered Reynard R/T 2000. The Californian driver finished eleventh in the championship standings. Sciuto also ran two races at Virginia International Raceway. The fast talent won his first race and finished second in the second race.

In 2005 Sciuto made his debut in the Atlantic Championship. In his second race, in the streets of Denver, Sciuto scored his first pole position. The Californian finished the race in second place. 2006 was Sciuto's first full season in the prestigious series. The best result was again in Denver finishing third. The young driver finished eighth in the championship standings. Sciuto repeated this performance the following season racing for his own team, Alan Sciuto Racing. In 2008 Sciuto made a single outing in the Atlantic Championship. In the streets of Long Beach Sciuto finished second.

== Racing record ==
=== American open–wheel racing results ===
(key) (Races in bold indicate pole position) (Races in italics indicate fastest lap)

==== USF2000 National Championship results ====
Year	Entrant	1	2	3	4	5	6	7	8	9	10	11	12	Pos	Points
2005	Cape Motorsports	ATL1	ATL2	MOH1	MOH2	CLE1	CLE2	ROA1	ROA2	MOH3	MOH4	**VIR1**; 1	VIR2; 2	**N.C.**	**N.C.**

==== Star Mazda Championship ====
Year	Team	1	2	3	4	5	6	7	8	9	10	11	12	Rank	Points
2005	Hearn Motorsports	SEB	ATL1	MOH; 17	MON	PPR	SON1; 41	SON2; 7	POR	RAM	MOS	ATL2	LAG	**N.C.**	**N.C.**

==== Atlantic Championship results ====
Year	Team	1	2	3	4	5	6	7	8	9	10	11	12	Rank	Points
2005	PR1 Motorsports	LBH	MTY	POR1	POR2	CLE1	CLE2	TOR	EDM	SJO; 4	**DEN**; 2	ROA; 7	MTL	**12th**	**69**
2006	Polestar Racing Group	LBH; 10	HOU; 6	MTY; 7	POR; 4	CLE1; 15	CLE2; 9	TOR; 17	EDM; 11	SJO; 15	DEN; 3	MTL; 6	ROA; 8	**8th**	**167**
2007	Alan Sciuto Racing	LVG; 7	LBH; 29	HOU; 6	POR1; 7	POR2; 27	CLE; 9	MTT; 12	TOR; 6	EDM1; 19	EDM2; 4	SJO; 7	ROA; 20	**8th**	**140**
2008	Genoa Racing	LBH; 2	LS	MTT	EDM1	EDM2	ROA1	ROA2	TRR	NJ	UTA	ATL		**23rd**	**27**
