= Newman Wachs Racing =

Newman Wachs Racing (also referred to as NWR) is an auto racing team owned by Eddie Wachs and, until his death, Paul Newman. NWR was based outside of Chicago in Mundelein, Illinois. Newman and Wachs met when they both competed in Can-Am series in the mid-1970s and over the years talked about joining forces to create a driver development race team. They formed a Champ Car Atlantic team for the 2006 season to meet their objectives.

In 2009, John Edwards won the Atlantic Championship, beating teammate Jonathan Summerton in a tiebreaker.

For 2010, the team entered a SpeedSource-prepared Mazda RX-8 in the Rolex Sports Car Series GT class for Edwards and Adam Christodoulou.

In 2016, the team announced a return to open wheel racing in the U.S. F2000 National Championship.

== Drivers ==
=== Atlantic Championship ===
- 2006: Joe D'Agostino (#34), Daniel Gaunt/Steve Ott (#35), J. R. Hildebrand (#36)
- 2007: Tõnis Kasemets (#34), J. R. Hildebrand (#36)
- 2008: Simona de Silvestro (#34), Jonathan Summerton (#36)
- 2009: John Edwards (Champion) (#36), Markus Niemelä (#1), Jonathan Summerton (#34)

=== Rolex Sports Car Series ===
- 2010: John Edwards, Adam Christodoulou

== Results ==
=== Complete Atlantic Championship results ===
(key) (results in bold indicate pole position) (results in italics indicate fastest lap)

Year	Car	Drivers	No.	1	2	3	4	5	6	7	8	9	10	11	12	D.C.	Points
2006	Swift-Mazda Cosworth			LBH	HOU	MTY	POR	CLE		TOR	EDM	SJO	DEN	MTL	ROA		
2006	Swift-Mazda Cosworth	(United States) Joe D'Agostino	34	11	12	9	24	9	7	7	7	22	18	16	7	12th	123
2006	Swift-Mazda Cosworth	(New Zealand) Daniel Gaunt	35	20	DNS	15	8	22	21							24th	22
2006	Swift-Mazda Cosworth	(United States) Steve Ott^{1}	35							21	21	20	23	18		19th	48
2006	Swift-Mazda Cosworth	(United States) J. R. Hildebrand	36												19	43rd	2
2007	Swift-Mazda Cosworth			LVG	LBH	HOU	POR		CLE	MTT	TOR	EDM		SJO	ROA		
2007	Swift-Mazda Cosworth	(Estonia) Tõnis Kasemets	34												17	29th	4
2007	Swift-Mazda Cosworth	(United States) J. R. Hildebrand	36	13	30	7	6	9	2	9	19	21	5	15	9	7th	140
2008	Swift-Mazda Cosworth			LBH	LAG	MTT	EDM		ROA		TRR	NJ	UTA	ATL			
2008	Swift-Mazda Cosworth	(Switzerland) Simona de Silvestro	34	1	10	9	8	19	9	18	4	11	5	4		8th	167
2008	Swift-Mazda Cosworth	(United States) Jonathan Summerton	36	4	6	12	6	1*	19	1	2	3	2	**14**		**3rd**	224
2009	Swift-Mazda Cosworth			SEB	UTA	NJM		LIM	ACC		ACC2	MDO	MOS	TRR	ATL	LAG	
2009	Swift-Mazda Cosworth	(Finland) Markus Niemelä^{2}	1	12	9	4	4									6th	98
2009	Swift-Mazda Cosworth	(United States) Jonathan Summerton^{3}	34					4	2	11	**1**	3	**1**	**1**	2	**2nd**	182
2009	Swift-Mazda Cosworth	(United States) John Edwards	36	1	2	5	6	2	**1**	**1**	9	2	2	3	**1**	**1st**	182

^{1} Ott also competed in 4 races for Jensen MotorSport.
^{2} Niemelä also competed in 8 races for Jensen MotorSport.
^{3} Summerton also competed in 4 races for Genoa Racing.

== See also ==
- Newman/Haas Racing
