= Jonathan Bomarito =

American racing driver (born 1982)

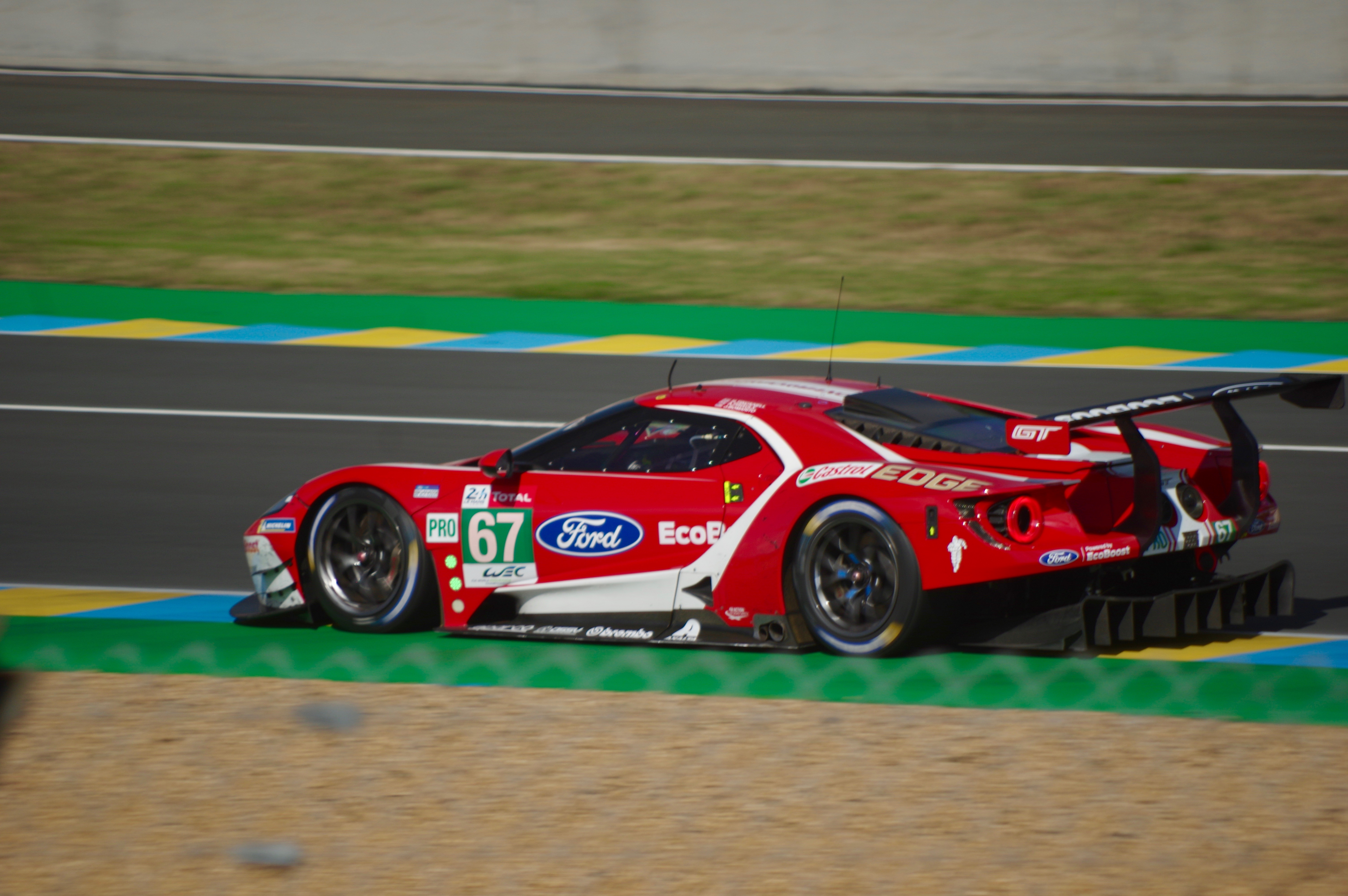
- Bomarito in 2019
- Nationality: (United States) American
- Born: January 23, 1982 (age 44) Monterey, California, U.S.
- Categorisation: FIA Gold (until 2014, 2019–); FIA Platinum (2015–2018)

Previous series
- American Le Mans Series; Rolex Sports Car Series; Atlantic Championship; Indy Lights; U.S. F2000 National Championship; Star Mazda Championship

Jonathan Lewis Bomarito (born January 23, 1982) is an American professional racing driver from Monterey, California.

After much success in karting and two years driving in Grand-Am Cup, Bomarito moved to Formula Ford 2000 USA in 2003 and won the championship. The next year he moved to the Atlantic Championship and finished ninth in points. The following year, he captured his first series win and finished fifth in the championship. 2007 saw him finishing fifth again, winning at San Jose. In 2008, he was the Atlantic Series runner-up, capturing three victories. He also competed in the 24 Hours of Daytona in 2005, 2008 and 2009.

In 2010, Bomarito was regular driver of the Grand-Am Rolex Sports Car Series driving a Mazda RX-8's GT class. He achieved two wins (including a class win at the 24 Hours of Daytona) and five podiums, finishing fourth in the championship. Bomarito finished fifth in the standings in the GT class Drivers' championship in 2011 and 2012, with one win and four podiums in both seasons. He also completed the 2012 Petit Le Mans with a Dodge Viper GTS.

In 2013, Bomarito became SRT Motorsports' official driver in the American Le Mans Series. In a SRT Viper GTS-R and with Kuno Wittmer as co-driver scored two podiums, finishing thirteenth in the Drivers' Championship GT class. They also contested the 24 Hours of Le Mans with Tommy Kendall as third driver, finishing ninth in class. Bomarito and Wittmer remained as co-drivers in the team in the new United SportsCar Championship in 2014, scoring two victories at Indianapolis and Austin. They entered the final round tied on points with Antonio García of Corvette Racing, so SRT elected to split the two drivers across both their cars in order to maximise the marque's chance of winning the GTLM drivers' title. The strategy worked but it was Wittmer who finished ahead, placing Bomarito second in the standings.

For 2015, Bomarito re-signed with Mazda to drive in the prototype class. Results were initially modest until Joest Racing took over the management of the team ahead of the introduction of DPi regulations for 2018. Joest elected to withdraw from the final races of the 2017 season in order to maximise testing time for the following season. Save for a few reliability issues in early 2018, Bomarito and the team have since enjoyed a very successful period, winning four races with co-driver Harry Tincknell including the 2020 12 Hours of Sebring and finishing third overall in the 2020 WeatherTech SportsCar Championship.

== Complete motorsports results ==
=== American Open-Wheel racing results ===
(key) (Races in bold indicate pole position, races in italics indicate fastest race lap)

==== USF2000 National Championship ====
Year	Entrant	1	2	3	4	5	6	7	8	9	10	11	12	Pos	Points	Ref
2003	PR1 Motorsports	SEB1; 2	SEB2; 8	**LRP1**; 1	LRP1; 3	MOH1; 3	MOH2; 5	ROA1; 3	ROA2; 4	**MOH3**; 1	MOH4; 1	ATL1; 1	**ATL2**; 1	**1st**	**267**	

==== Star Mazda Championship ====
Year	Team	1	2	3	4	5	6	7	8	9	10	11	12	Rank	Points	Ref
2004	PR1 Motorsports	SEB	MOH	LRP	SON	POR	MOS	ROA	ATL	PIR	LAG; 37			**N.C.**	**N.C.**	
2005	MJ Motorsports	SEB	ATL1; 4	MOH	MON	PPR	SON1	SON2	POR	RAM	MOS	ATL2	LAG	**N.C.**	**N.C.**	

==== Atlantic Championship ====
Year	Team	1	2	3	4	5	6	7	8	9	10	11	12	Rank	Points	Ref
2004	Transnet Racing	LBH; 6	MTY; 5	MIL; 8	POR1; 4	POR2; 3	CLE; 5	TOR; 11	VAN	ROA	DEN	MTL	LS	9th	134	
2006	PR1 Motorsports	LBH; 23	HOU; 3	MTY; 4	POR; 14	CLE1; 4	CLE2; 8	TOR; 2	EDM; 6	SJO; 16	DEN; 16	MTL; 15	ROA; 1	6th	178	
2007	PR1 Motorsports	LVG; 3	LBH; 2	HOU; 4	POR1; 24	POR2; 7	CLE; 22	MTT; 4	TOR; 20	EDM1; 14	EDM2; 2	**SJO**; 1	ROA; 4	5th	207	
2008	Mathiasen Motorsports	**LBH**; 5	LS; 19	MTT; 6	EDM1; 1	EDM2; 4	ROA1; 1	**ROA2**; 2	**TRR**; 1	NJ; 9	UTA; 6	ATL; 17		2nd	228	
2009	Mathiasen Motorsports	SEB; 18	UTA	NJ1	NJ2	LIM	ACC1	ACC2	MOH	TRR	MOS			11th	19	
2009	Team Stargate Worlds											ATL; 4	LS; 8	11th	19	

==== Indy Lights ====
Year	Team	1	2	3	4	5	6	7	8	9	10	11	12	13	14	15	Rank	Points
2009	Genoa Racing	STP1	STP2	LBH; 18	KAN	INDY	MIL	IOW	WGL	TOR	EDM	KTY	MOH	SNM	CHI	HMS	**30th**	**12**

=== 24 Hours of Le Mans results ===
Year	Team	Co-Drivers	Car	Class	Laps	Pos.	Class Pos.
2013	(United States) SRT Motorsports	(United States) Tommy Kendall (Canada) Kuno Wittmer	SRT Viper GTS-R	GTE; Pro	301	31st	9th
2019	(United States) Ford Chip Ganassi Team UK	(United Kingdom) Andy Priaulx (United Kingdom) Harry Tincknell	Ford GT	GTE; Pro	342	23rd	4th

=== American Le Mans Series results ===
(key) (Races in bold indicate pole position; results in italics indicate fastest lap)

Year	Team	Class	Make	Engine	1	2	3	4	5	6	7	8	9	10	Pos.	Points	Ref
2012	SRT Motorsports	GT	SRT Viper GTS-R	SRT 8.0 L V10	SEB	LBH	LAG	LRP	MOS	MOH	ELK	BAL	VIR	PET; DNF	NC	0	
2013	SRT Motorsports	GT	SRT Viper GTS-R	SRT 8.0 L V10	SEB; 10	LBH; 8	LAG; DNF	LRP; 5	**MOS**; **3**	**ELK**; **6**	BAL; 6	COA; 2	VIR; 9†	PET; 5	9th	73	

^{†} Did not finish the race but was classified as his car completed more than 70% of the overall winner's race distance.

=== WeatherTech SportsCar Championship results ===
(key)(Races in bold indicate pole position. Races in italics indicate fastest race lap in class. Results are overall/class)

Year	Team	Class	Make	Engine	1	2	3	4	5	6	7	8	9	10	11	Rank	Points	Ref
2014	SRT Motorsports	GTLM	SRT Viper GTS-R	Dodge 8.0 L V10	DAY; 6	SEB; 2	LBH; 10	LGA; 7	WGL; 3	MOS; 2	IMS; 1	ELK; 3	VIR; 5	COA; 1	ATL; 6	**2nd**	**326**	
2015	SpeedSource	P	Mazda Prototype	Mazda 2.2 L SKYACTIV-D (SH-VPTS) I4 Turbo (diesel)	DAY; 12	SEB; 10	LBH; 8	LGA; 6	DET	WGL	MOS	ELK	COA; 8	PET; 7		9th	141	
2016	Mazda Motorsports	P	Mazda Prototype	Mazda MZ-2.0T 2.0 L I4 Turbo	DAY; 10	SEB; 6	LBH; 5	LGA; 4	DET; 3	WGL; 8	MOS; 8	ELK; 5	COA; 8	PET; 9		7th	257	
2017	Mazda Motorsports	P	Mazda RT24-P	Mazda MZ-2.0T 2.0 L Turbo I4	DAY; 11	SEB; 5	LBH; 3	COA; 10	DET; 5	WGL; 3	MOS; 4	ELK	LGA			8th	205	
2017	VisitFlorida Racing	P	Ligier JS P217	Gibson GK428 4.2 L V8										PET; 7		8th	205	
2018	Mazda Team Joest	P	Mazda RT24-P	Mazda MZ-2.0T 2.0 L Turbo I4	DAY; 16	SEB; 6	LBH; 9	MOH; 14	DET; 14	WGL; 10	MOS; 11	ELK; 8	LGA; 4	PET; 3		10th	218	
2019	Mazda Team Joest	DPi	Mazda RT24-P	Mazda MZ-2.0T 2.0 L Turbo I4	DAY; 9	SEB; 6	LBH; 8	MOH; 3	DET; 11	**WGL**; 1	MOS; 2	ELK; 1	LGA; 10	PET; 11		6th	263	
2020	Mazda Team Joest	DPi	Mazda RT24-P	Mazda MZ-2.0T 2.0 L Turbo I4	DAY; 6											3rd	260	
2020	Mazda Motorsports	DPi	Mazda RT24-P	Mazda MZ-2.0T 2.0 L Turbo I4		DAY; 1	SEB; 5	ELK; 5	ATL; 2	MOH; 4	ATL; 6	LGA; 4	SEB; 1			3rd	260	
2021	Mazda Motorsports	DPi	Mazda RT24-P	Mazda MZ-2.0T 2.0 L Turbo I4	DAY; 3	SEB; 2	MOH	DET	WGL; 1	WGL	ELK	LGA	LBH	PET; 1		9th	1436	
2022	PR1/Mathiasen Motorsports	LMP2	Oreca 07	Gibson GK428 4.2 L V8	DAY; 8	SEB; 4	**LGA**; 5	MOH; 2	WGL; 6	ELK	PET					9th	1232	
