= Luis Schiavo =

Venezuelan racing driver

- Nationality: Venezuelan
- Born: Luis Alberto Schiavo; July 3, 1981 (age 45)
- Retired: 2008

Atlantic Championship
- Years active: 2008; 2006
- Teams: EuroInternational (2008); Brooks Associates Racing (2006)
- Starts: 11
- Wins: 0
- Poles: 0
- Fastest laps: 0
- Best finish: 20th in 2008

Previous series
- 2001–2005 2002 1999–2000 1989–1999: Star Mazda; USF2000; Skip Barber Southern Series; Karting

Championship titles
- 2003: Star Mazda

Luis Schiavo (born July 3, 1981, in Caracas, Venezuela) is a former racing driver. Schiavo won the 2001 Pro Mazda title and also participated in USF2000, Atlantic Championship among other series.

== Racing career ==
Schiavo made his formula racing debut in the Skip Barber Southern Series in 1999 after a ten-year karting career. The Venezuelan finished his first race, at Sebring International Raceway, in fourth place (behind Craig Duerson, Rafael Sperafico and Bud Risser). Racing a partial schedule in the 1999-2000 season Schiavo ended 35th in the season standings.

In 2001 Schiavo debuted in the Star Mazda series. He qualified eighth at Sears Point Raceway finishing the race in tenth place. For 2002, Schiavo competed a partial Star Mazda season in combination with a full season in USF2000. In Star Mazda, Schiavo scored his first podium, at Road Atlanta. An eighth place was his best result in USF2000.

The following year, 2003, Schiavo made a title assault in Star Mazda. The Venezuelan won four races in the final season for the 'old' aluminium tube chassis Star Mazda car. Schiavo finished in the top five in eight out of nine races securing the title. Failing to step up to the Atlantic Championship, Schiavo returned to Star Mazda in 2004, now in the new carbon fiber monocoque chassis. The talented driver won the season finale at Mazda Raceway Laguna Seca and secured a fifth place in the series standings. For 2005, Schiavo ran a partial Star Mazda schedule. He ran the first four races of the season not scoring any significant results. Schiavo also tested a Lola B02/00 Champ Car prepared by Dale Coyne Racing. At Putnam Park Raceway, Schiavo beat the team's previous best time at the track.

Brooks Associates Racing announced Schiavo as one of their drivers for the 2006 Atlantic Championship season. However, after three races the deal ended and Schiavo was left without a race seat. Schiavo had just scored his season best result of eleventh place at the Tecate/Telmex Grand Prix of Monterrey. After not racing in 2007, EuroInternational signed Schiavo for most of the 2008 Atlantic Championship season. Schiavo scored his best result at the season finale. In a seventeen car strong field, Schiavo ended in seventh place.

However, as Champ Car had ceased its operation after the merger with IndyCar, Schiavo was left without a focus. The Venezuelan returned to his home country and was the promoter for the Rotax Max Challenge Venezuela. In 2011, he won the Rotax Max Challenge Venezuela in the DD2 Senior class. After moving to Miami in 2012, Schiavo was a regular competitor in the Florida Winter Tour. He won Winter Tour championships in the Rotax DD2 Masters and Rotax Masters classes.

== Personal life ==
Schiavo first attended the University of St. Thomas (Texas) earning a Bachelor of Business Administration degree in 2002. In 2006, Schiavo earned a Bachelor of Commerce degree from the University of Calgary. In 2014, Schiavo was living in Miami with his wife and one daughter.

== Complete motorsports results ==
=== American Open-Wheel racing results ===
(key) (Races in bold indicate pole position, races in italics indicate fastest race lap)

==== Star Mazda Championship ====
Year	Team	1	2	3	4	5	6	7	8	9	10	11	12	Rank	Points
2001	Racers Edge Motorsports	TEX	SEB	SON; 10	POR; 37	MOS; 10	LS1; 38	ATL; 4	LS2; 41					???	???
2002	Racers Edge Motorsports	SEB	SON	PPI	MOH	ROA; 7	WAS; 20	MOS	LAG; 29	ATL; 2				**20th**	**111**
2003	Racers Edge Motorsports	SEB; 14	NAZ; 4	**LS1**; 1	**ATL1**; 3	SON; 1	**MOS**; 1	ROA; 2	**LS2**; 4	**ATL2**; 1				**1st**	**349**
2004	Racers Edge Motorsports	SEB; 10	MOH; 7	LRP; 24	SON; 7	POR; 22	MOS; 16	ROA; 5	ATL; 2	PIR; 12	LAG; 1			**5th**	**273**
2005	Team HASA Racing	SEB; 4	ATL1; 6	MOH; 46	MON; 40	PPR	SON1	SON2	POR	RAM	MOS	ATL2	LAG	**33rd**	**66**

==== USF2000 National Championship ====
Year	Entrant	1	2	3	4	5	6	7	8	9	10	11	12	Pos	Points
2002	Roquin Motorsports	SEB1; 8	SEB2; 10	MOS1; 18	MOS2; 12	IRP; 17	MIL1; 10	MIL2; 13	MOH; 13	ROA1	ROA2	VIR1	VIR2	**15th**	**62**

==== Atlantic Championship ====
Year	Team	1	2	3	4	5	6	7	8	9	10	11	12	Rank	Points
2006	Brooks Associates Racing	LBH; 15	HOU; 26	MTY; 11	POR	CLE1	CLE2	TOR	EDM	SJO	DEN	MTL	ROA	**28th**	**16**
2008	EuroInternational	LBH; 18	LS; 18	MTT; DNS	EDM1; 16	EDM2; 14	ROA1; 10	ROA2; 12	TRR; 16	NJ	UTA	ATL; 7		**20th**	**60**
