= Carl Skerlong =

American racing driver

- Born: September 23, 1988 (age 38) Mukilteo, Washington, US

Atlantic Championship
- Years active: 2007–2008
- Teams: US RaceTronics; Pacific Coast Motorsports
- Starts: 22
- Wins: 1
- Poles: 2
- Fastest laps: 6
- Best finish: 6th in 2008

Carl Skerlong (born September 23, 1988) is an American former racing driver.

== Racing career ==
Skerlong began his racing career in Formula TR 1600 Pro Series in 2005, where he won 14 races and the championship. In 2006, he moved to the Formula TR 2000 Pro Series winning the championship with 16 wins in 19 starts.

In 2007, Skerlong drove for US RaceTronics and finished on the podium twice in the 2007 Champ Car Atlantic Championship. For 2008, Skerlong moved to Pacific Coast Motorsports after merging with US RaceTronics. Skerlong won his first pole position at Edmonton and would score his first win from pole position at New Jersey Motorsports Park. Skerlong suffered a season-ending concussion at the final race of the season at Road Atlanta.

== Racing record ==
=== Career summary ===
Season	Series	Team	Races	Wins	Poles	F/Laps	Podiums	Points	Position
2005	Formula TR 1600 Pro Series		16	14			15	530	1st
2006	Formula Renault UK Winter Series	Fortec Motorsport	4	0	0	0	0	54	8th
2006	Star Mazda Championship	Northwest Autosport	2	0	0	0	0	46	38th
2006	Formula TR 2000 Pro Series		19	16	16		19	963	1st
2007	Atlantic Championship	US RaceTronics	12	0	0	2	2	114	10th
2008	Atlantic Championship	Pacific Coast Motorsports	10	1	2	4	4	189	6th
2009	American Le Mans Series - ALMS Challenge	Gruppe Orange	1	0	1	1	0	58	2nd
