= David Garza (racing driver) =

Mexican racing driver (born 1988)

- Nationality: (Mexico) Mexican
- Full name: David Garza Pérez
- Born: June 22, 1988 (age 38) Monterrey, Mexico

Champ Car Atlantic
- Years active: 2007-2009
- Teams: Forsythe Championship Racing; Jensen MotorSport
- Starts: 20
- Wins: 0
- Poles: 0
- Fastest laps: 0
- Best finish: 13th in 2008

Previous series
- 2007-08-2008-09 2006: A1 Grand Prix; Formula BMW USA

David Garza Pérez (born June 22, 1988) is a Mexican racing driver. He has raced in the A1 Grand Prix and Champ Car Atlantic series.

== Career ==
=== Karting ===
- 2005 : 2nd in Shifter 125cc debut season
- 2004 : Mexican Rotax Jr. Champion; Champion in Rotax Jr. of Cam Kart championship; 12th in the Rotax Grand Nationals in Las Vegas

=== Formulas ===
In 2006, Garza signed with EuroInternational to race in Formula BMW USA Junior. He finish 9th overall (4th in rookie championship).

Garza joined the A1 Team Mexico and drove in the A1 Grand Prix series in 2007-08 season.

== Career results ==
Season	Series	Team	Races	Wins	Poles	Fast laps	Points	Pos.
2009	Champ Car Atlantic	Jensen MotorSport	2	0	0	0	8	17th
2008-09	A1 Grand Prix	A1 Team Mexico	4	0	0	0	19	13th (1)
2008	Champ Car Atlantic	Forsythe Championship Racing	6	0	0	0	94	13th
2007-08	A1 Grand Prix	A1 Team Mexico	10	0	0	0	5	16th (1)
2007	Champ Car Atlantic	US Racetronics	12	0	0	0	78	17th
2006	Formula BMW USA	EuroInternational	14	0	2	0	42	10th

- (1) = Team standings.
