= Brooks Associates Racing =

American motorsport team

(United States) Brooks Associates Racing
- Founded: 2000
- Team principal(s): John C. Brooks
- Former series: Atlantic Championship
- Teams' Championships: 1 (2008)
- Drivers' Championships: 1 (2008)

Brooks Associates Racing is an American motorsport team based in Tucson, Arizona, which competes in the Indy Lights series. It previously competed in the Atlantic Championship where it won the 2008 season championship.

The team was founded in 2000 by owner John C. Brooks, a former driver himself.

== Atlantic Championship ==
=== 2004 ===
Ronnie Bremer raced the first five races of the season with Brooks Associates Racing, before moving to Polestar Motor Racing. He was replaced by Al Unser III for three late season races. Tõnis Kasemets made six starts for the team and finished thirteenth in points. The team's best showing was a 2nd place podium finish at the Milwaukee Mile, by Bremer. Australian Daniel Pappas also drove in the season finale for the team.

=== 2005 ===
German Andreas Wirth and Al Unser III finished 6th and 7th, respectively, in the overall standings for the team, despite both drivers missing two races. Wirth captured the team's first win on the Denver street circuit. Fernando Rees also drove in the season opener for the team and Memo Rojas drove one race in for the team in Monterrey.

=== 2006 ===
The team featured an all-rookie lineup of part-time drivers Alex Sperafico (9 of 12 rounds), Carlos Mastretta Aguilera (6 rounds), Norbert Siedler (3 rounds), and Luis Schiavo (3 rounds).none of whom finished in the top 20 in the overall driver standings. The best performer was Mastretta, finished ranked 21st in points.

=== 2007 ===
The team raced two cars (#8 and #10) during the 2007 season, neither of which competed full-time. Its best result was Kevin Lacroix’s win in the second race at Portland International Raceway. Lacroix finished 13th in points, competing in 8 of the 12 races. Jiang Tengyi drove in three races for the team and was the first Chinese driver to compete in the Champ Car series. Joe D'Agostino competed in two additional races for the team. Ronnie Bremer also returned to the team for a single race.

=== 2008 ===
The team won the Atlantic Championship in 2008 in the final race of the season. Niemelä won the final two races, at the SunRichGourmet.com 1000 at Miller Motorsports Park where he started from pole position and led every lap of the race; and the Atlanta Atlantic Challenge at Road Atlanta. This was the first title win by a Finnish driver in the series. Niemelä was subsequently named Rookie of the Year.

Andreas Wirth drove car #88 for the first 3 races, and was then replaced by Tom Sutherland, who finished 15th in points. At the end of the season, both cars were sold to Primetime Race Group, and Brooks Associates Racing sat out the 2009 season.

== Indy Lights ==
The team returned to professional competition in the Firestone Indy Lights series in 2011 when it entered a car for Ryan Phinny in the Long Beach race. The team also fielded a car for Chase Austin in conjunction with Willy T. Ribbs Racing in the Freedom 100 and the Iowa Speedway race.
