= Polestar Racing Group =

American motorsports team

(United States) Polestar Racing Group
- Founded: 2001
- Team principal(s): Jim and Pam Griffith
- Current series: Atlantic Championship
- Teams' Championships: 2012, 2015
- Drivers' Championships: David Grant (2012), Keith Grant (2015)

Polestar Racing Group is an American motorsport team based in Chardon, Ohio, which competes in the Atlantic Championship. It was founded in 2001 and is owned by husband and wife team Jim and Pam Griffith, and Bruce Potter.

Polestar has notched 6 victories in the Atlantic series, the first one in 2004, by Ronnie Bremer, who moved to Polestar after driving the season's first five races for Brooks Associates Racing.

The team is notable for running female driver Katherine Legge during the 2005 season, who became the first woman to win a developmental open-wheel race in North America when she won the season's first race at Long Beach.

The team won the revived SCCA 2012 Atlantic Championship, with Memphis-area homebuilder David Grant winning the first of the revived series.

== The team ==
Polestar Racing Group was founded in 2001 and is owned by husband and wife team Jim and Pam Griffith, and Bruce Potter. Jim Griffith is a race engineer, who was part of the Atlantic championship-winning team of Patrick Carpentier (1996), Alex Barron (1997), and Buddy Rice (2000). Additional team members include engineer Glenn Knabenshue and chief mechanics Constantin Gheorghe and Jason Robb.

== 2003 season ==
Drivers: Jonathan Macri

2003 was the team's first season in the Atlantic championship. Jonathan Marci finished fourth in the drivers’ standings.

== 2004 season ==
Drivers: Ronnie Bremer

Polestar won its first Atlantic Championship race, with Ronnie Bremer taking the checkered flag at the Denver street circuit. Bremer finished fifth in the Atlantic Championship and second in the Rookie of the Year standings and the graduated to the Champ Car series where he raced for one season for both Dale Coyne Racing and the HVM team

== 2005 season ==
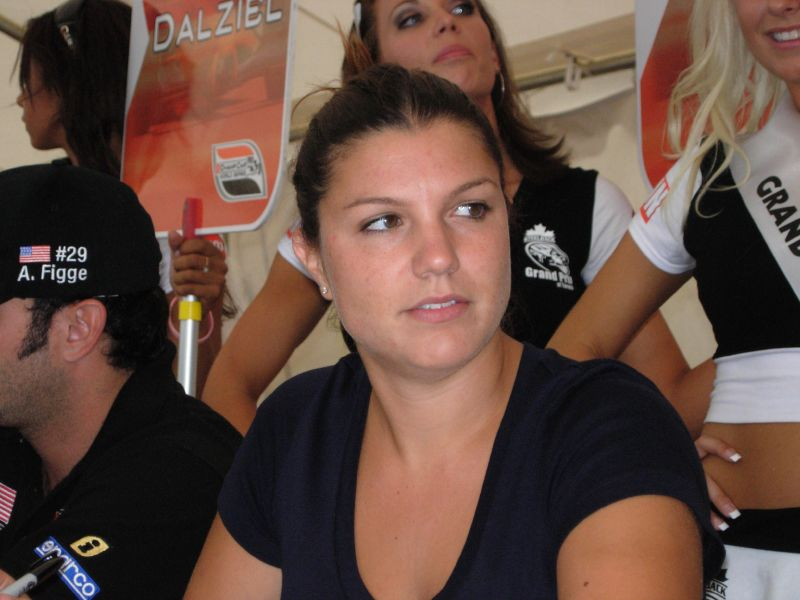
Katherine Legge

Drivers: Katherine Legge, Antoine Bessette

By far the team's most successful season, Polestar won 5 races in 2004, making them the most successful team for that season. Katherine Legge earned three wins and Antoine Bessette won an additional two races, as well as earning pole position in one of them. Legge and Bessette finished third and fourth, respectively, in the championship final standings. Legge won the series opener at the Long Beach Grand Prix in her first career Atlantic championship start. In doing so, she became the first woman to win a developmental open-wheel race in North America. Legge went on to win two more races, at Edmonton and San Jose. She had a total finished of five podium finishes, and received the Toyota Atlantic BBS Rising Star 2005 Award. Bessette won at Toronto and Montreal. For the season, he had 4 podium finishes, and received the Gilles Villeneuve award by the Atlantic series.

== 2006 season ==
Drivers: Alan Sciuto, Antoine Bessette, Ronnie Bremer

Alan Scuito, a rookie, finished the season ranked 8th. He became the youngest-ever Atlantic pole winner at just 17 years of age at Denver. Ronnie Bremer made a single appearance, in Montreal. Antoine Bassette returned to drive in one race, the season finale at Road America in Elkhart Lake, Wisconsin.

== 2007 season ==
Drivers: Ronnie Bremer, Bret MacDonald

The team again ran two cars in 2007. Bremer returned to the Atlantic Championship and to Polestar, after driving the 2005 season in the Champ Car series.

== 2008 season ==
Drivers: Rich Zober

The team competed in a single race, at the New Jersey Motorsports Park.
