= O2 Racing Technology =

Auto racing team in the Indy Lights series

(United States) O2 Racing Technology
- Folded: 2011
- Team principal(s): Mark Olson
- Former series: Indy Lights

O2 Racing Technology (also known as Genoa Racing) was an American auto racing team owned by Mark Olson that competed in the Indy Lights series.

== History ==
The team ran the No. 36 and 63 entries in the Indy Lights series for 2011 with Peter Dempsey and Mikaël Grenier. They were suspended from Indy Lights along with owner Mark Olson until the end of 2012 over issues with the David Hobbs 100 at the Milwaukee Mile and the team withdrawing. IndyCar accused the team and owner of four Indy Lights rule book violations because of their interference with the running of the event. The appeal of the penalties were later denied in July 2011. The issues with Olson and Indycar were resolved in late 2013.
