= Edmonton Indy =

Car race in Edmonton, Alberta, Canada

IndyCar Series
- Location: Edmonton City Centre Airport, Edmonton, Alberta, Canada; 53°34′32″N 113°31′22.5″W
- First race: 2005
- First ICS race: 2008
- Last race: 2012
- Laps: 75
- Previous names: West Edmonton Mall Grand Prix (2005); West Edmonton Mall Grand Prix Presented by The Brick (2006); Rexall Grand Prix of Edmonton (2007); Rexall Edmonton Indy (2008–2009); Honda Indy Edmonton (2010); Edmonton Indy (2011–2012)
- Most wins (driver): Sébastien Bourdais (2); Scott Dixon (2); Will Power (2)
- Most wins (team): Penske Racing (3)

Circuit information
- Surface: Concrete
- Length: 3.579 km (2.224 mi)
- Turns: 13

The Edmonton Indy was a round of the IndyCar Series held at a temporary circuit set up at the Edmonton City Centre Airport near the downtown area of Edmonton, Alberta, Canada. It was originally launched in 2005, as a race in the Champ Car World Series called the West Edmonton Mall Grand Prix, and was one of three Champ Car races added to the 2008 IndyCar Series following the merger of the two American open-wheel racing series.

== History ==
The inaugural race was held in 2005 and was known as the West Edmonton Mall Grand Prix. It was known in 2006 as the West Edmonton Mall Grand Prix Presented by The Brick. In 2007, Katz Group, whose holdings include Rexall Drugs, signed with the Grand Prix of Edmonton as the lead sponsor, with that year's race known as the Rexall Grand Prix of Edmonton, becoming the Rexall Edmonton Indy following the merger of Champ Car and Indy Car during the 2008 season. In 2010, Honda Canada Inc. was title sponsor of the Honda Indy Edmonton. For 2011 and 2012, there was no title sponsor, with the race known simply as the Edmonton Indy.

During the 2010 race weekend, it was announced that Octane Motorsports Events from Montreal, promoter of the Formula 1 Canadian Grand Prix and the NASCAR Nationwide Series race at Circuit Gilles Villeneuve, was taking over as the new promoter. In November 2010, the city and the promoter were not able to reach an agreement concerning pavement work to be done on the Eastern runway of City Centre Airport, where the race course was to be moved, initially cancelled the 2011 event. Further negotiations had the race reinstated on the 2011 IZOD IndyCar Series schedule, for July 22–24. On February 8, 2011, the promoter unveiled the new 13-turn, 3.579-kilometre (2.224 mi) racecourse.

On September 21, 2012, Octane Motorsports announced that they would not stage the 2013 race due to poor attendance and lack of support from local businesses. City officials stated that they would not look for a replacement promoter, and the Edmonton Indy has not returned since.

Over the eight race history of the Canadian-based Edmonton Indy, there was only one podium finish by a Canadian driver, when Paul Tracy finished second in 2005; Tracy also led all Canadian drivers with six top-6 finishes over the history of the race.

== Festivities ==
=== 2005 ===
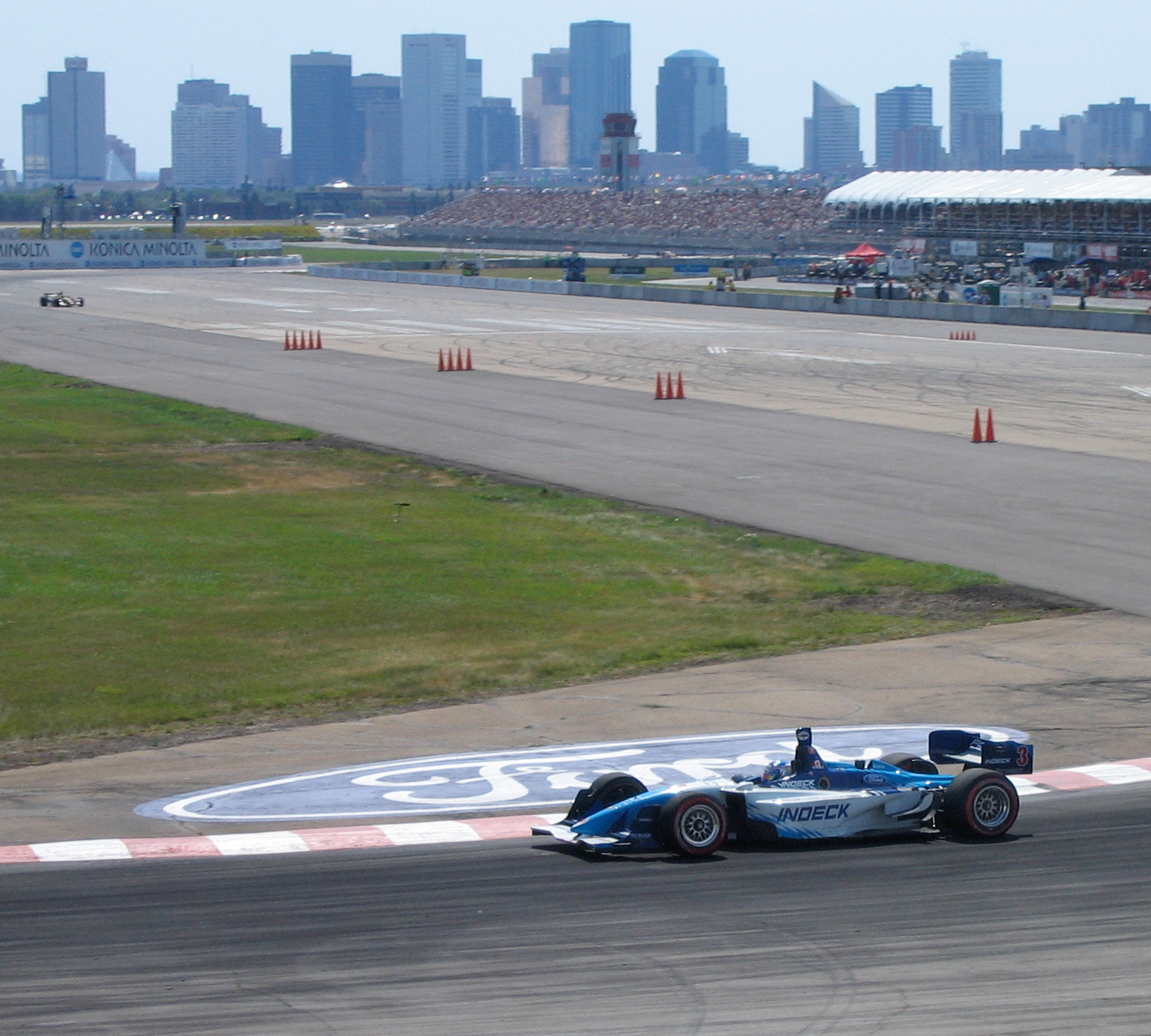
Paul Tracy at the Edmonton Grand Prix 2006.

The 2005 race festivities took place from July 15 through July 17, 2005.

=== 2006 ===
In 2006, there were 3 support series events. The Champ Car Atlantic Championship series, the CASCAR series, and D-Sport Drifting Demo. The 2006 race festivities took place from July 21 through July 23, 2006. The CASCAR race event took place on Saturday, July 22, 2006. The Champ Car Atlantic Championship race, the Champ Car World Series race, and the D-Sport Drifting Demo all took place on Sunday, July 23, 2006.

=== 2007 ===
The 2007 race festivities took place from July 20 through July 22, 2007. The Northern Alberta Sports Car Club held GT and Vintage class support races also.

=== 2008 ===
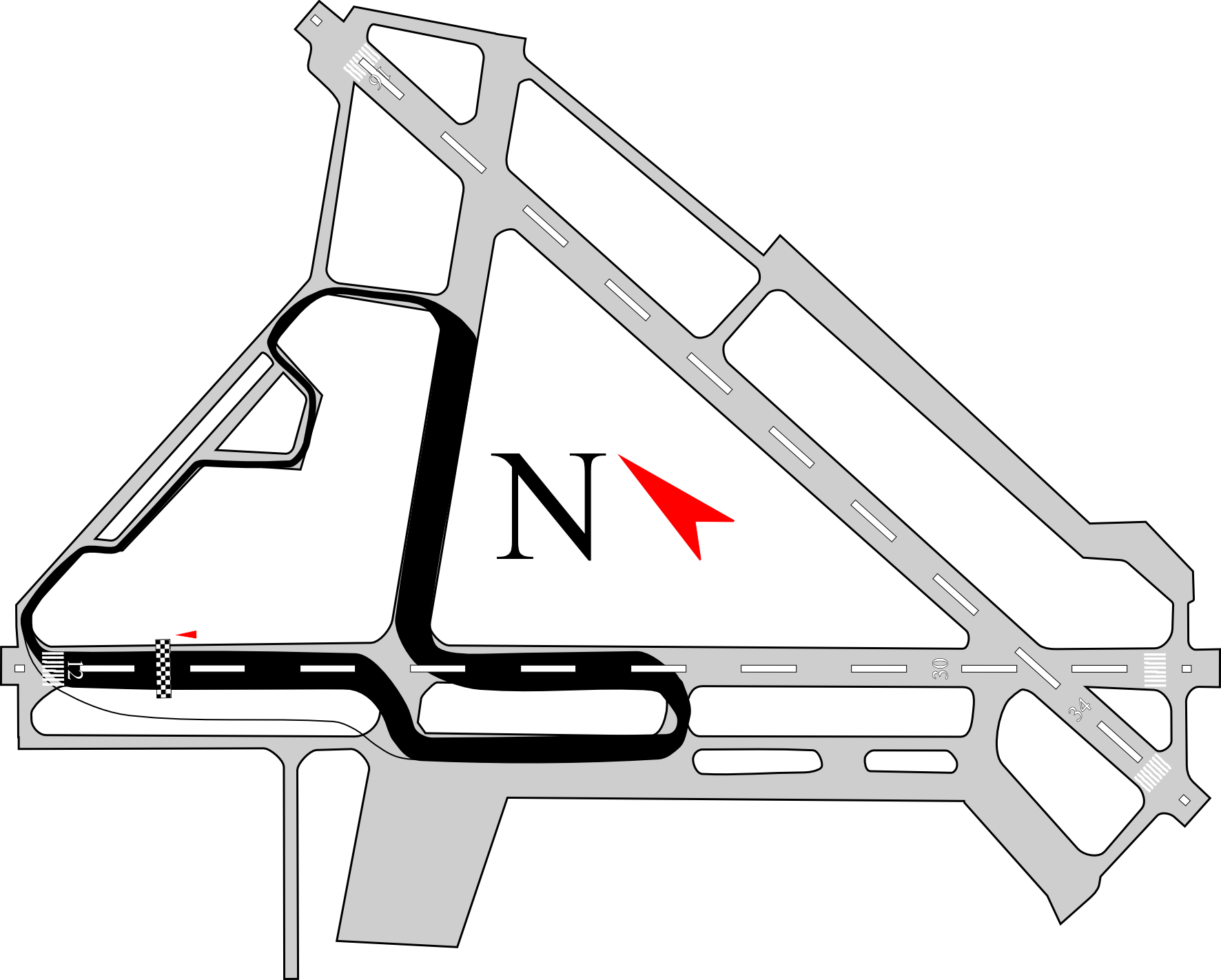
The former track layout in relationship to the rest of the airport

The 2008 race festivities took place July 24 through July 26, 2008. There were also 2 support series events, the Atlantic Championship series and the NASCAR Canadian Tire Series. The IndyCar Series race took place on Saturday and not Sunday in 2008 because of an agreement between IndyCar and the Indianapolis Motor Speedway. By agreement, IndyCar is not permitted to race opposite the NASCAR Sprint Cup Series Brickyard 400, which took place at the Indianapolis Motor Speedway on Sunday.

=== 2009 ===
Held on July 26, 2009, it was the eleventh round of the 2009 IndyCar Series season.

=== 2010 ===
A new track from the 2011.

The race festivities took place from July 23 through July 25, 2010. There were three support series at this event, the Indy Lights Series, NASCAR Canadian Tire Series and the Northern Alberta Sports Car Championship. In addition, there were also a demonstration provided by D-Sport Drifting.

This year also saw the creation of an off the track event team called Race Week Edmonton. This all volunteer team's mandate was to assist in promoting the Honda Edmonton Indy with various events such as car shows, a go kit derby, autoslalom, and a large slate of music events.

=== 2011 ===
The race festivities took place from July 22 through July 24, 2011. However, steady rainfall saw the cancellation of all on-track events on July 22. This caused Indy Lights and IndyCar practice sessions to be moved to July 23. There were two support series at this event, the Indy Lights Series and the Northern Alberta Sports Car Championship. Unlike previous years, the Indy Lights Series ran two races with one on Saturday and one on Sunday, these were known as the Edmonton Twin 100s Race.

This event also saw the debut of a new course, moving from the western runways to the eastern runways of the City Centre Airport. This was caused by redevelopment of airport lands by the City of Edmonton. As well, Octane Motorsports took over the promoting of the race from Northlands declined to continue to run the race. This caused a temporary cancellation of the event in November, 2011. During this cancellation, the NASCAR Canadian Tire Series released their schedule and saw Edmonton not scheduled for the 2011 season.

=== 2012 ===
The 2012 Edmonton Indy race was the eleventh round of the 2012 IndyCar Series season. Indy Lights and the NASCAR Canadian Tire Series also took place. It took place on Sunday, July 22, 2012. Hélio Castroneves won in the IndyCar Series, Carlos Muñoz won in the Indy Lights series, and D. J. Kennington won in the NASCAR Canadian Tire Series.

The 2012 Edmonton Indy was the last in Edmonton. The city had spent over $12 million over the last three years and a total of $22 million over eight years. Beginning in 2008 the non-profit organization Northlands ran the Indy for three years, losing $12.5 million. There was also drop in attendance for the event over the last few years; IndyCar forbids releasing attendance numbers. This also played a part in the decision to cancel.

== Past winners ==
Season	Date	Driver	Team	Chassis	Engine	Race Distance		Race Time	Average Speed (mph)	Report	Ref
Season	Date	Driver	Team	Chassis	Engine	Laps	Miles (km)	Race Time	Average Speed (mph)	Report	Ref
Champ Car World Series history
2005	July 17	(France) Sébastien Bourdais	Newman/Haas Racing	Lola	Ford-Cosworth	88	173.624 (279.42)	1:38:55	105.302	Report	
2006	July 23	(United Kingdom) Justin Wilson	RuSPORT	Lola	Ford-Cosworth	85	167.705 (269.895)	1:40:30	100.112	Report	
2007	July 22	(France) Sébastien Bourdais	Newman/Haas/Lanigan Racing	Panoz	Cosworth	96	189.408 (304.822)	1:45:41	107.517	Report	
IndyCar Series history
2008	July 26	(New Zealand) Scott Dixon	Chip Ganassi Racing	Dallara	Honda	91*	179.543 (288.946)	1:51:06	96.967	Report	
2009	July 26	(Australia) Will Power	Penske Racing	Dallara	Honda	95	187.435 (301.647)	1:42:42	109.498	Report	
2010	July 25	(New Zealand) Scott Dixon	Chip Ganassi Racing	Dallara	Honda	95	187.435 (301.647)	1:50:37	101.666	Report	
2011	July 24	(Australia) Will Power	Penske Racing	Dallara	Honda	80	180.48 (290.454)	1:57:23	90.949	Report	
2012	July 22	(Brazil) Hélio Castroneves	Penske Racing	Dallara	Chevrolet	75	169.2 (272.301)	1:38:51	101.246	Report	

- 2008: Race shortened due to time limit.

=== Atlantic Championship ===
Season	Date	Winning driver
2005	July 17	(United Kingdom) Katherine Legge
2006	July 23	(France) Simon Pagenaud
2007	July 21	(Brazil) Raphael Matos
2007	July 22	(Brazil) Raphael Matos
2008	July 25	(United States) Jonathan Bomarito
2008	July 26	(United States) Jonathan Summerton

=== Firestone Indy Lights ===
Season	Date	Winning driver
2009	July 25	(United States) J. R. Hildebrand
2010	July 25	(Canada) James Hinchcliffe
2011	July 23	(Argentina) Esteban Guerrieri
2011	July 24	(United States) Josef Newgarden
2012	July 21	(Colombia) Carlos Muñoz

=== NASCAR Canadian Tire Series ===
Season	Date	Winning driver
2007	July 21	(Canada) J. R. Fitzpatrick
2008	July 26	(Canada) Alex Tagliani
2009	July 25	(Canada) Andrew Ranger
2010	July 25	(Canada) J. R. Fitzpatrick
2012	July 22	(Canada) D. J. Kennington

== Lap records ==
The fastest official race lap records at Edmonton Indy are listed as:

Category	Time	Driver	Vehicle	Event
Grand Prix Circuit (2011–2012): 3.579 km (2.224 mi)
IndyCar	1:17.3629	Josef Newgarden	Dallara DW12	2012 Edmonton Indy
Indy Lights	1:23.0712	Esteban Guerrieri	Dallara IPS	2011 Edmonton 100
Original Circuit (2005–2010): 3.175 km (1.973 mi)
Champ Car	0:58.653	Sebastien Bourdais	Lola B02/00	2007 Rexall Grand Prix of Edmonton
IndyCar	1:02.0233	Will Power	Dallara IR-05	2008 Rexall Edmonton Indy
Formula Atlantic	1:05.647	Simon Pagenaud	Swift 016.a	2006 Edmonton Formula Atlantic round
Indy Lights	1:06.8782	James Hinchcliffe	Dallara IPS	2010 Edmonton 100
Trans-Am	1:17.361	Tomy Drissi	Jaguar XKR	2005 Edmonton Trans-Am round

== Attendance ==
In its inaugural year (2005), Edmonton set the attendance record for a Champ Car event in Canada at 200,052.

Year	Race Day	3-Day Total
2005	78,080	200,052
2006	63,921	171,391
2007	60,508	167,152
2008	60,000*	160,000*

* Estimate

From 2008 onwards, event organizers have refused to disclose attendance figures due to an agreement with the Indy Racing League.
