= Mike Guasch =

American racing driver (born 1958)

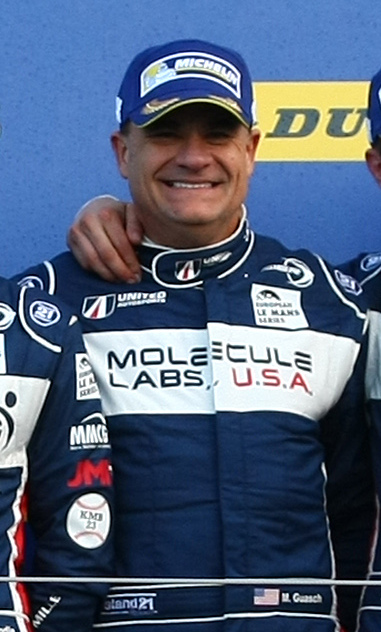
- Guasch in 2016
- Nationality: (United States) American
- Born: February 25, 1958 (age 68) Palo Alto, California, U.S.
- Categorisation: FIA Bronze (2010–2013, 2016–); FIA Silver (2014–2015)

Championship titles
- 2016 2015 2013 2009: European Le Mans Series – LMP3; North American Endurance Cup – LMPC; American Le Mans Series – LMPC; Star Mazda Championship – Masters

Michael N. Guasch (born February 25, 1958) is an American businessman and racing driver, best known for his career in LMPC and LMP3. He was American Le Mans Series champion for PR1/Mathiasen Motorsports in 2013, and European Le Mans Series champion for United Autosports in 2016.

== Business ventures ==
Guasch became a lube technician for Express Lube in 1989 shortly after serving in the U.S. Navy as a jet mechanic. In 1992, Guasch became a district manager of SpeeDee Oil Change, before taking over as Vice President of Operations for the entire company in 2017. In parallel, Guasch founded StoneTech Professional and worked at the company before selling it to DuPont in 2005, and was CEO of Molecule Labs.

In 2019, Guasch was featured in "The Gentleman Driver", a Netflix documentary detailing him and three other businessmen-drivers as they balanced work and their racing careers.

== Racing career ==
Guasch initially took up dirt racing and motocross at the age of 17, before switching to jet ski competitions and being active there until 1991. In 2005, Guasch began competing in single-seaters, primarily racing in the Star Mazda Championship until 2009. During his stint in junior formulae, Guasch finished runner-up in the 2008 Star Mazda West Coast Championship, as well as clinching the Masters class title in the following year's Star Mazda Championship for JDC MotorSports.

In 2010, Guasch joined United Autosports to drive an Audi R8 LMS in the FIA GT3 European Championship alongside fellow amateur racer Mark Patterson. They scored a best result of 10th three times in the last two rounds to end the year 33rd overall. Switching to the British GT Championship for 2011, Guasch won at Snetterton and took two other podiums to finish sixth in the GT3 standings alongside Matt Bell. That year, Guasch also raced part-time for Genoa Racing in the LMPC class of the American Le Mans Series, winning in both of his starts at the 12 Hours of Sebring and Laguna Seca.

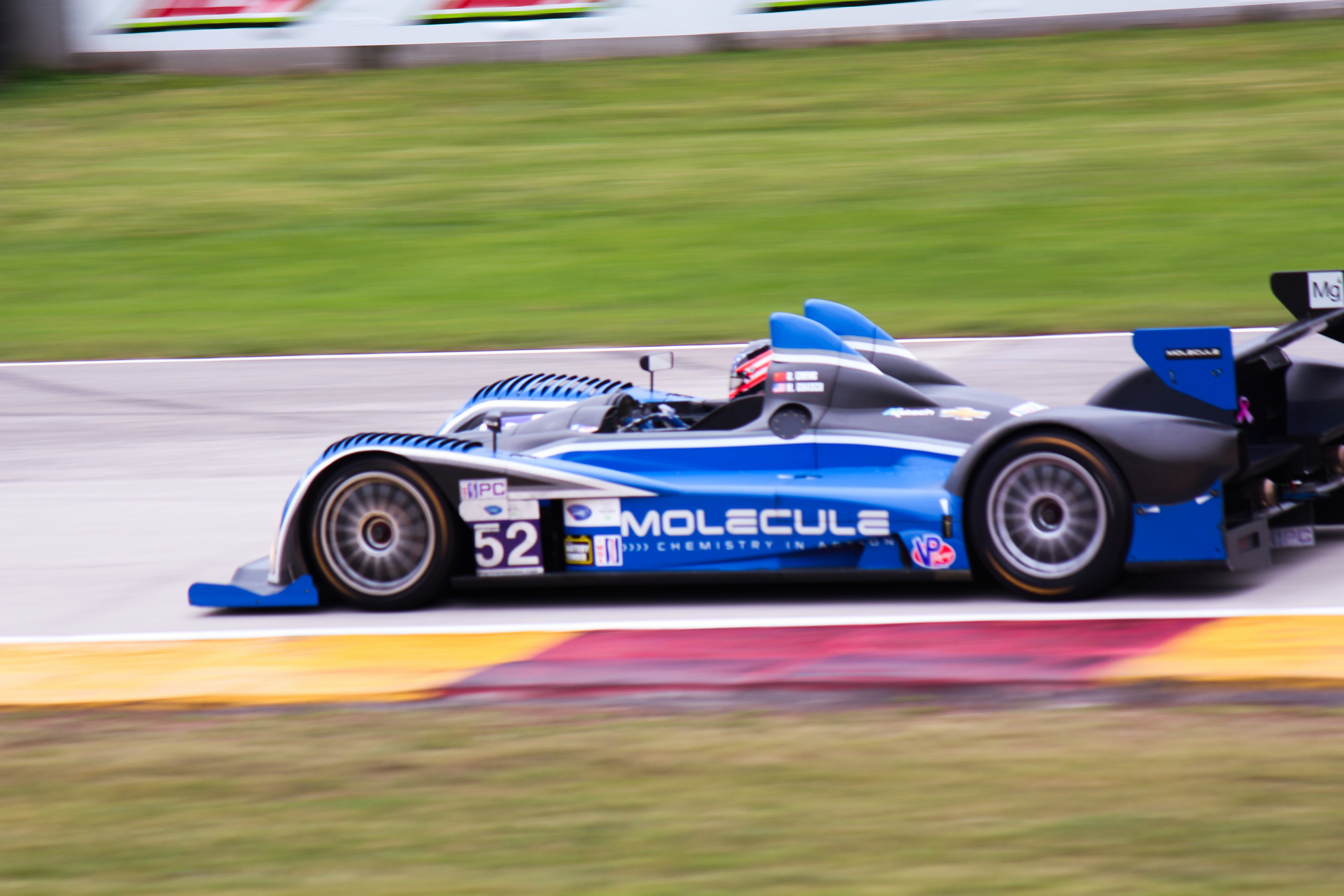
Guasch driving PR1/Mathiasen's LMPC at Road America in 2013.

Continuing in ALMS for 2012, Guasch drove for Muscle Milk Pickett Racing in the first three races and scored a lone podium at Long Beach. Moving to PR1/Mathiasen Motorsports for 2013, Guasch won at Sebring and Laguna Seca and scored four other podiums to clinch the LMPC title. After a part-time campaign in the new United SportsCar Championship in 2014, Guasch went full-time again in 2015, taking four wins at the 24 Hours of Daytona, Sebring, Lime Rock and Petit Le Mans to finish runner-up in points alongside Tom Kimber-Smith, and claim the North American Endurance Cup title.

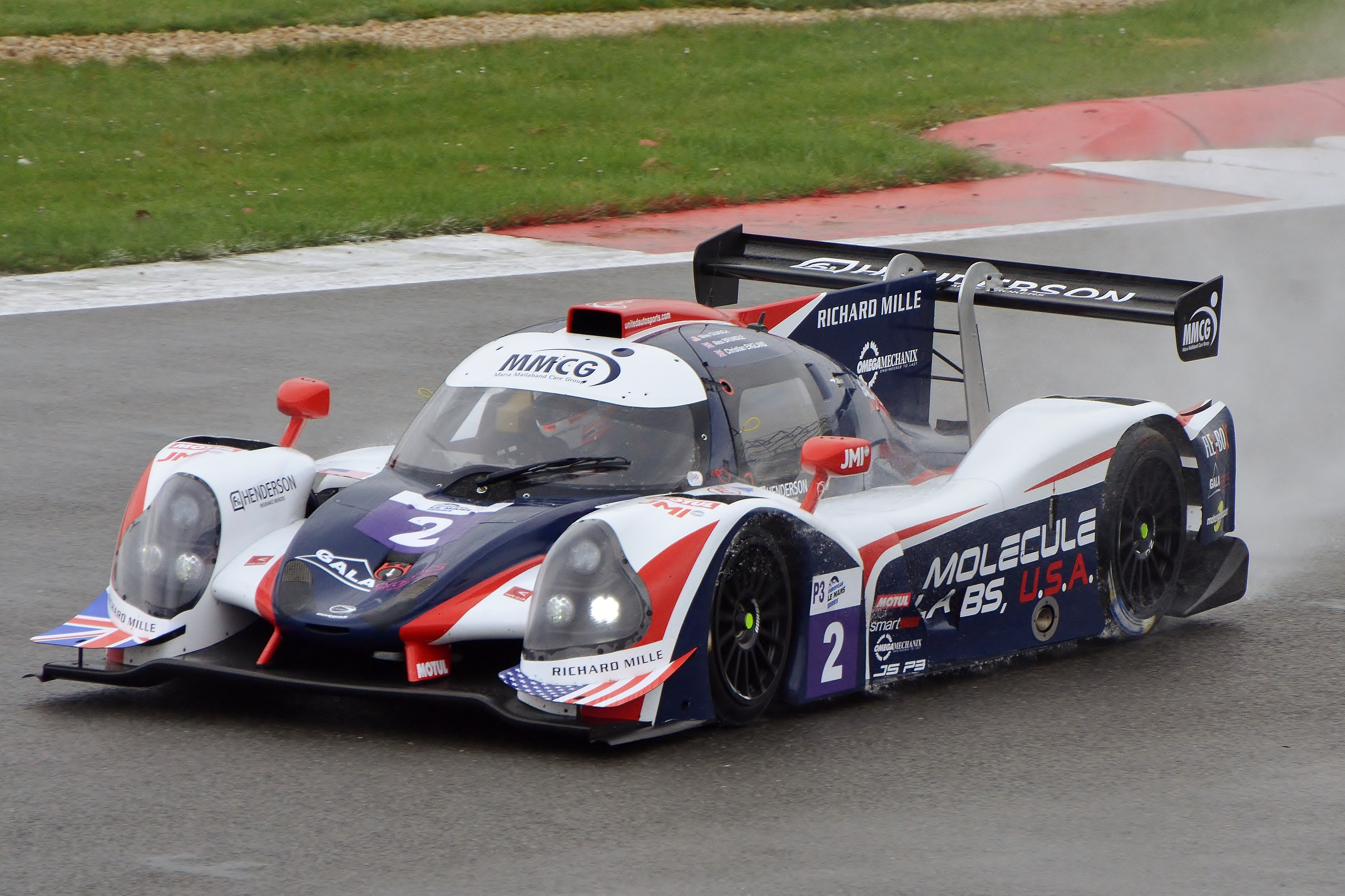
Guasch driving United Autosports' LMP3 at Silverstone in 2016.

In 2016, Guasch reunited with United Autosports to compete in the LMP3 class of the European Le Mans Series, partnering Alex Brundle and Christian England. The trio secured three wins in a row at the start of the season at Silverstone, Imola and Red Bull Ring, before adding two more podiums to seal the LMP3 title with a race to spare. Guasch then briefly returned to PR1/Mathiasen to make his LMP2 debut in the 2017 IMSA SportsCar Championship, before taking a sabbatical.

In 2019, Guasch returned to LMP3 with United Autosports. After four ELMS rounds with England and a Le Mans Cup podium at Barcelona with Wayne Boyd, a crash at Silverstone left Guasch with a broken rib and ended his season. After recovery, Guasch began racing karts in SKUSA-sanctioned races in the Master Shifter class.

== Karting record ==
=== Karting career summary ===
Season	Series	Team	Position
2021	SKUSA SuperNationals – Master Shifter	Phenom Racing Group	7th
2022	SKUSA SuperNationals – Master Shifter		19th
2023	SKUSA SuperNationals – Master Shifter		13th
2024	SKUSA SuperNationals – Master Shifter		42nd

== Racing record ==
=== Racing career summary ===
Season	Series	Team	Races	Wins	Poles	F/Laps	Podiums	Points	Position
2005	Star Mazda Championship		3	0	0	0	0		
2006	Star Mazda Championship		8	0	0	0	0	138	24th
2007	Russell Pro Series		8	0	0	0	1	37	10th
2008	Star Mazda West Coast Championship		13	1	2	0	8	458	**2nd**
2008	Star Mazda Championship		6	0	0	0	0	106	21st
2009	Star Mazda Winter Series		2	0	0	0	1	69	4th
2009	Star Mazda Championship	JDC MotorSports	10	0	0	0	0	202	16th
2009	Molecule Formula Mazda Challenge – Pro Formula Mazda		9	4	7	7	7	298	4th
2010	Star Mazda Winter Series		1	0	0	0	0		
2010	British GT Championship – GT3	United Autosports	2	0	0	0	0	5	27th
2010	FIA GT3 European Championship	United Autosports	12	0	0	0	0	3	33rd
2010	Molecule Formula Mazda Challenge – Pro Formula Mazda		1	0	0	0	0		
2011	American Le Mans Series – LMPC	Genoa Racing	2	2	0	0	2	0	NC
2011	British GT Championship – GT3	United Autosports	10	1	0	0	3	110.5	6th
2011	Supercar Challenge – GT		2	2	0	0	2		
2012	Formula Car Challenge Winter Series – Pro Formula Mazda		2	0	0	0	0	33	10th
2012	American Le Mans Series – LMPC	Muscle Milk Pickett Racing	3	0	0	0	1	40	12th
2013	American Le Mans Series – LMPC	PR1/Mathiasen Motorsports	10	2	0	0	6	142	**1st**
2014	United SportsCar Championship – LMPC	PR1/Mathiasen Motorsports	2	0	0	0	0	30	31st
2015	United SportsCar Championship – LMPC	PR1/Mathiasen Motorsports	10	4	0	0	5	313	**2nd**
2016	European Le Mans Series – LMP3	United Autosports	6	3	0	0	5	109.5	**1st**
2017	IMSA SportsCar Championship – Prototype	PR1/Mathiasen Motorsports	2	0	0	0	0	46	25th
2019	IMSA Prototype Challenge	PR1/Mathiasen Motorsports	1	0	0	0	0	9	50th
2019	European Le Mans Series – LMP3	United Autosports	4	0	0	0	0	15	14th
2019	Le Mans Cup – LMP3	United Autosports	2	0	0	0	1	23	10th

^{†} As Guasch was a guest driver, he was ineligible to score points.

=== Complete British GT Championship results ===
(key) (Races in bold indicate pole position) (Races in italics indicate fastest lap)

Year	Team	Car	Class	1	2	3	4	5	6	7	8	9	10	11	12	13	DC	Points
2010	United Autosports	Audi R8 LMS	GT3	OUL; 1; 8	OUL; 2; 5	KNO; 1	KNO; 2	SPA	ROC; 1	ROC; 2	SIL	SNE; 1	SNE; 2	BRH; 1	BRH; 2	DON	27th	5
2011	United Autosports	Audi R8 LMS	GT3	OUL; 1; 2	OUL; 2; 3	SNE; 1	BRH; Ret	SPA; 1; 6	SPA; 2; 5	ROC; 1; 10	ROC; 2; 5	DON; 7	SIL; 22				6th	110.5

=== Complete FIA GT3 European Championship results ===
(key) (Races in bold indicate pole position; races in italics indicate fastest lap)

Year	Entrant	Chassis	Engine	1	2	3	4	5	6	7	8	9	10	11	12	Pos.	Points
2010	United Autosports	Audi R8 LMS	Audi 5.2 L V10	SIL; 1; 20	SIL; 2; 14	BRN; 1; 14	BRN; 2; 19	JAR; 1; 12	JAR; 2; 11	LEC; 1; 17	LEC; 2; 18	ALG; 1; 10	ALG; 2; 14	ZOL; 1; 10	ZOL; 2; 10	33rd	3

=== Complete American Le Mans Series results ===
(key) (Races in bold indicate pole position)

Year	Team	Class	Make	Engine	1	2	3	4	5	6	7	8	9	10	Rank	Points
2011	Genoa Racing	LMPC	Oreca FLM09	Chevrolet LS3 6.2 L V8	SEB; 1	LBH	LRP	MOS	MDO	ELK	BAL	LGA; 1	PET		NC	0
2012	Muscle Milk Pickett Racing	LMPC	Oreca FLM09	Chevrolet LS3 6.2 L V8	SEB; 5	LBH; 2	LAG; 4	LIM	MOS	MOH	ELK	BAL	VIR	PET	12th	40
2013	PR1/Mathiasen Motorsports	LMPC	Oreca FLM09	Chevrolet LS3 6.2 L V8	SEB; 1	LBH; 2	LGA; 1	LIM; 6	MOS; 4	ELK; 3	BAL; 3	COT; 2	VIR; 5	PET; 5	1st	143

=== Complete IMSA SportsCar Championship results ===
(key) (Races in bold indicate pole position. Races in italics indicate fastest race lap in class. Results are overall/class)

Year	Team	Class	Car	Engine	1	2	3	4	5	6	7	8	9	10	Rank	Points
2014	PR1/Mathiasen Motorsports	LMPC	Oreca FLM09	Chevrolet LS3 6.2 L V8	DAY; 4	SEB; 9	LGA	KAN	WGL	IMS	ELK	VIR	COT	PET	31st	30
2015	PR1/Mathiasen Motorsports	LMPC	Oreca FLM09	Chevrolet LS3 6.2 L V8	DAY; 1	SEB; 1	LGA; 7	DET; 6	WGI; 2	MOS; 5	LRP; 1	ELK; 4	AUS; 4	ATL; 1	2nd	313
2017	PR1/Mathiasen Motorsports	P	Ligier JS P217	Gibson GK428 4.2 L V8	DAY; 9	SEB; 7	LBH	COA	DET	WGL	MOS	ELK	LGA	PET	25th	46

=== Complete European Le Mans Series results ===
Year	Team	Class	Car	Engine	1	2	3	4	5	6	Rank	Points
2016	United Autosports	LMP3	Ligier JS P3	Nissan VK50VE 5.0 L V8	SIL; 1	IMO; 1	RBR; 1	LEC; 3	SPA; 2	**EST**; 11	1st	109.5
2019	United Autosports	LMP3	Ligier JS P3	Nissan VK50VE 5.0 L V8	LEC; 8	MNZ; 10	CAT; 5	SIL; Ret	SPA	ALG	14th	15

=== Complete Le Mans Cup results ===
(key) (Races in bold indicate pole position; results in italics indicate fastest lap)

Year	Entrant	Class	Chassis	1	2	3	4	5	6	7	Rank	Points
2019	United Autosports	LMP3	Ligier JS P3	LEC	MNZ; 6	LMS; 1	LMS; 2	CAT; 3	SPA	ALG	10th	23
