= Charles Hall (racing driver) =

British racing driver (born 1979)

Charles Hall (born 13 November 1979) is a British racing driver from Sheffield, England.

After beginning racing in karts, Hall moved to car racing in 1997 at the age of 18 in BARC Formula Renault and the Formula Vauxhall Winter Series. He finished second in the main championship of Formula Vauxhall the following year in 1998. In 1999, he drove in the British Formula Three Championship B-class and finished fifth in the Formula Vauxhall Europa Cup. In 2000, he competed in British Formula Renault and finished sixth with one victory at Silverstone Circuit. After starting 2001 in Formula Renault 2000 UK, he moved to the United States mid year to compete in Toyota Atlantic. In 2002, he competed in several different series. In 2003, he captured the Fran-Am 2000 winter series championship in the United States and drove in assorted other races in Europe. In 2005, he was scheduled to drive in GP2 but was injured in a road crash. He returned to racing in 2006 and appeared in three Champ Car Atlantic Series races. In 2008, he continued racing in America in the Star Mazda Series for Andersen Racing and was slated to make his Indy Lights debut in July at Watkins Glen International driving for the same team but he did not appear on track. He has not appeared in a professional auto race since 2008.

== Star Mazda Championship ==
Year	Team	1	2	3	4	5	6	7	8	9	10	11	12	Rank	Points
2008		SEB; 2	UTA; 2	WGI; 1	POR; 29	POR; 4	ROA; 3	TRR; 5	MOS; 19	NJ1; 6	NJ2; 5	ATL; 22	LAG	5th	342
