= 2009 Star Mazda Championship =

Seasons
- ← 2008 2010 →

The 2009 Star Mazda Championship was the eleventh season of the Star Mazda Championship, an open wheel auto racing series that competes using spec chassis and engines. It consisted of a 13-race schedule beginning in March and ending in October. For the first time since 2006, the series featured races on oval tracks, more precisely the Milwaukee Mile and the Iowa Speedway. The remaining races except the one at Virginia were held jointly with the also Mazda-backed Atlantic Championship. In addition to the main championship that is typically tested by young, developing drivers, there were also additional class titles for senior drivers.

Adam Christodoulou won the championship ahead of Peter Dempsey, after the Irish driver's retirement at the final round at Mazda Raceway Laguna Seca gifted the title to the Briton. Chris Cumming and Michael Guasch won class titles for older drivers.

== Teams and Drivers ==
Team	No.	Driver(s)	Round(s)	Notes
AIM Autosport	3	(Republic of Ireland) Peter Dempsey	1–5	
AIM Autosport	71	(Canada) David Ostella	All	
AIM Autosport	72	(Venezuela) Jorge Goncalvez	All	
AIM Autosport	73	(Brazil) Giancarlo Vilarinho	13	Unregistered
American Speed Factory	31	(Puerto Rico) Carlos Conde	2, 4–5, 8–9	Masters Series
Andersen Racing	2	(United States) Joel Miller	7–13	
Andersen Racing	5	(United States) Joe D'Agostino	1	
Andersen Racing	17	(Canada) Mikaël Grenier	2–6, 10	
Andersen Racing	21	(Brazil) Denis Navarro	All	
Andersen Racing	22	(United States) Conor Daly	All	
Andersen Racing	33	(United Kingdom) Richard Kent	1, 3–13	
DF Racing	12	(United States) Chuck Hulse	3, 13	Masters Series
Eliseo THL Motorsports	77	(Chile) Kevin Toledo	1–10, 12	
Goshen Motorsports	80	(Japan) Toshi Deki	1–10	Expert Series
Goshen Motorsports	82	(United States) Billy Goshen	1–7	
Goshen Motorsports	83	(United States) Ryan Booth	1–2	
Goshen Motorsports	83	(United States) Bruce Binnquist	3	Unregistered
JDC MotorSports	2	(United States) Joel Miller	1–6	
JDC MotorSports	11	(United Kingdom) Adam Christodoulou	All	
JDC MotorSports	19	(Brazil) Caio Lara	All	
JDC MotorSports	20	(Venezuela) Gustavo Linares	3, 6–7	Unregistered
JDC MotorSports	51	(United States) Alex Ardoin	All	
JDC MotorSports	55	(United States) Gerry Kraut	1–4, 8, 11–13	Masters Series
JDC MotorSports	85	(United States) Chris Miller	12–13	Unregistered
JDC MotorSports	91	(United States) Michael Guasch	1–5, 8–11, 13	Masters Series
Juncos Racing	3	(Republic of Ireland) Peter Dempsey	6–13	
Juncos Racing	13	(Canada) Michael Furfari	1–10	
Juncos Racing	23	(United States) Walt Bowlin	1–5, 10–12	Masters Series
Juncos Racing	61	(United States) Sean Burstyn	1–5, 7–10	
Juncos Racing	80	(Japan) Toshi Deki	11–13	Expert Series
Kester Racing with Team 3G	15	(Canada) Taylor Hacquard	1–7	
Kester Racing with Team 3G	16	(Canada) Chris Cumming	1–6	Expert Series
Kester Racing with Team 3G	24	(United States) Jeffery Kester	1–7	
Kester Racing with Team 3G	48	(United States) Kristy Kester	1–7	
Mitchell Motorsports	66	(United States) Rusty Mitchell	All	
Mundill	13	(Canada) Michael Furfari	11–13	
Mundill	27	(Norway) Anders Krohn	All	
Mundill	64	(United States) Patrick O'Neill	2–3, 13	Expert Series
Northwest Autosport	29	(United States) Phil Fogg	1, 3	Expert Series
Team Apex	57	(United States) Bob Kaminsky	8	Unregistered
Team GDT	30	(Brazil) Rick Rosin	2–5, 8–9, 12	Unregistered
Team GDT	30	(Canada) Kyle Marcelli	13	Unregistered
Team GDT	65	(United States) J. W. Roberts	1, 10, 13	Expert Series
Team GDT	65	(United States) Ashley Freiberg	8–9	Unregistered
Worldspeed Motorsports	16	(Canada) Chris Cumming	8–9, 12–13	Expert Series
Worldspeed Motorsports	18	(United States) Stan Kohls	3	Unregistered
Worldspeed Motorsports	86	(United States) Dave House	3	Unregistered

== Race calendar and results ==
Round	Circuit	Location	Date	Pole position	Fastest lap	Winning driver	Winning team
1	(United States) Sebring International Raceway	Sebring, Florida	March 20	(United Kingdom) Richard Kent	(Brazil) Caio Lara	(United Kingdom) Adam Christodoulou	JDC MotorSports
2	(United States) Virginia International Raceway	Alton, Virginia	April 26	(United Kingdom) Adam Christodoulou	(United Kingdom) Adam Christodoulou	(Republic of Ireland) Peter Dempsey	AIM Autosport
3	(United States) Miller Motorsports Park	Tooele, Utah	May 16	(United Kingdom) Adam Christodoulou	(United Kingdom) Adam Christodoulou	(United Kingdom) Adam Christodoulou	JDC MotorSports
4	(United States) New Jersey Motorsports Park	Millville, New Jersey	June 13	(United States) Conor Daly	(United States) Conor Daly	(United States) Conor Daly	Andersen Racing
5	(United States) New Jersey Motorsports Park	Millville, New Jersey	June 14	(United Kingdom) Richard Kent	(United Kingdom) Adam Christodoulou	(United Kingdom) Richard Kent	Andersen Racing
6	(United States) Milwaukee Mile	West Allis, Wisconsin	June 20	(United Kingdom) Richard Kent	(Republic of Ireland) Peter Dempsey	(Norway) Anders Krohn	Mundill
7	(United States) Iowa Speedway	Newton, Iowa	July 10	(Republic of Ireland) Peter Dempsey	(Republic of Ireland) Peter Dempsey	(Republic of Ireland) Peter Dempsey	Juncos Racing
8	(United States) Autobahn Country Club	Joliet, Illinois	July 25	(Republic of Ireland) Peter Dempsey	(United Kingdom) Adam Christodoulou	(Republic of Ireland) Peter Dempsey	Juncos Racing
9	(United States) Autobahn Country Club	Joliet, Illinois	July 26	(Republic of Ireland) Peter Dempsey	(United Kingdom) Adam Christodoulou	(Republic of Ireland) Peter Dempsey	Juncos Racing
10	(Canada) Circuit Trois-Rivières	Trois-Rivières, Quebec	August 16	(United States) Rusty Mitchell	(United States) Conor Daly	(United States) Alex Ardoin	JDC MotorSports
11	(Canada) Mosport International Raceway	Bowmanville, Ontario	August 29	(United Kingdom) Richard Kent	(United States) Conor Daly	(United Kingdom) Richard Kent	Andersen Racing
12	(United States) Road Atlanta	Braselton, Georgia	September 25	(Republic of Ireland) Peter Dempsey	(Republic of Ireland) Peter Dempsey	(Republic of Ireland) Peter Dempsey	Juncos Racing
13	(United States) Mazda Raceway Laguna Seca	Monterey, California	October 10	(Republic of Ireland) Peter Dempsey	(Republic of Ireland) Peter Dempsey	(United Kingdom) Adam Christodoulou	JDC MotorSports

== Championship standings ==
=== Overall ===
Pos	Driver	SEB (United States)	VIR (United States)	MMP (United States)	NJ (United States)		MIL (United States)	IOW (United States)	ACC (United States)		TRO (Canada)	MOS (Canada)	ATL (United States)	LAG (United States)	Points
1	(United Kingdom) Adam Christodoulou	1	**7**	**1**	2	24	2	5	2	2	5	3	3	1	473
2	(Republic of Ireland) Peter Dempsey	6	1	2	6	7	4	**1**	**1**	**1**	13	4	**1**	**20**	461
3	(United States) Conor Daly	3	5	22	**1**	8	21	2	3	5	14	2	2	4	416
4	(United States) Alex Ardoin	8	2	6	24	2	3	14	17	7	1	8	5	2	401
5	(United States) Joel Miller	5	3	3	5	4	14	18	7	4	3	12	4	16	390
6	(Norway) Anders Krohn	17	6	11	12	6	1	6	9	11	6	5	9	3	380
7	(United Kingdom) Richard Kent	**2**		4	8	**1**	**20**	17	4	3	19	**1**	6	6	377
8	(Brazil) Caio Lara	4	10	5	4	5	8	9	10	9	20	7	8	15	360
9	(Venezuela) Jorge Goncalvez	9	4	13	9	10	5	20	18	15	18	6	11	5	329
-	(Canada) Michael Furfari	12	25	9	7	11	10	8	8	6	8	13	13	9	329
11	(Brazil) Denis Navarro	15	19	8	18	9	13	15	6	10	10	10	7	7	321
12	(United States) Rusty Mitchell	11	26	16	25	25	6	4	16	13	**2**	11	10	17	295
13	(Canada) David Ostella	23	9	17	10	18	18	3	20	8	7	9	18	18	294
14	(Japan) Toshi Deki	26	17	24	23	21	17	11	15	17	16	15	15	14	237
15	(Chile) Kevin Toledo	10	27	19	14	16	19	7	19	14	17		14		220
16	(United States) Michael Guasch	18	14	20	26	17			11	12	11	16		13	202
17	(Canada) Chris Cumming	14	22	27	16	15	16		12	16			12	10	200
18	(Canada) Mikaël Grenier		8	7	3	3	12				4				189
19	(United States) Sean Burstyn	20	23	14	20	19		13	5	18	9				184
20	(United States) Billy Goshen	27	11	10	11	12	7	12							162
21	(United States) Gerry Kraut	21	16	23	19				13			14	16	12	154
22	(United States) Kristy Kester	24	13	15	13	13	15	10							149
23	(Canada) Taylor Hacquard	16	21	12	15	14	9	19							146
24	(United States) Jeffery Kester	13	24	21	17	20	11	16							130
25	(United States) Walt Bowlin	25	20	25	22	23					15	17	17		124
26	(Puerto Rico) Carlos Conde		18		21	22			14	19					86
27	(United States) Patrick O'Neill		15	26										8	59
28	(United States) J. W. Roberts	22									12			19	55
29	(United States) Chuck Hulse			17										11	43
30	(United States) Ryan Booth	28	12												32
31	(United States) Joe D'Agostino	7													29
32	(United States) Phil Fogg	19		27											25

Color	Result
Gold	Winner
Silver	2nd place
Bronze	3rd place
Green	4th & 5th place
Light Blue	6th–10th place
Dark Blue	Finished (Outside Top 10)
Purple	Did not finish
Red	Did not qualify (DNQ)
Brown	Withdrawn (Wth)
Black	Disqualified (DSQ)
White	Did not start (DNS)
Blank	Did not participate (DNP)
Blank	Not competing

**In-line notation**
**Bold**	Pole position (1 point)
Italics	Ran fastest race lap

=== Expert (age 30–44) ===
Pos	Name	Starts	Points
1	(Canada) Chris Cumming	10	184
2	(Japan) Toshi Deki	13	172
3	(United States) Patrick O'Neill	3	56
4	(United States) J. W. Roberts	3	46
5	(United States) Phil Fogg	2	28

=== Masters (age 45 and older) ===
Pos	Name	Starts	Points
1	(United States) Michael Guasch	10	178
2	(United States) Gerry Kraut	8	138
3	(United States) Walt Bowlin	8	112
4	(Puerto Rico) Carlos Conde	5	76
5	(United States) Chuck Hulse	2	40

Note: Expert and Masters classes have different point system than the overall championship.
