= Peter Dempsey =

Irish racing driver

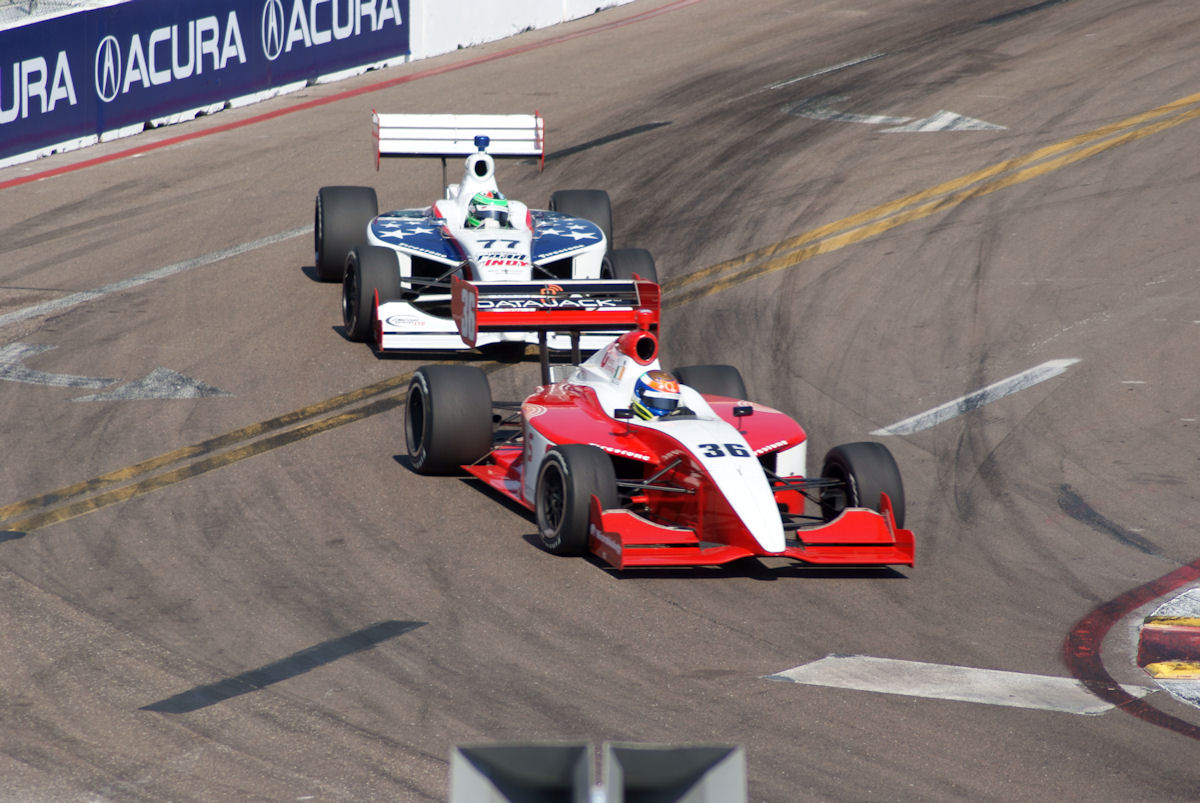
- Dempsey leading Conor Daly in 2011
- Nationality: (Republic of Ireland) Irish
- Born: Peter Samuel Dempsey; 31 March 1986 (age 40) Ashbourne, County Meath, Ireland
- Categorisation: FIA Silver (until 2025, 2027–); FIA Bronze (2026)

Peter Samuel Dempsey (born 31 March 1986) is an Irish racing driver.

Dempsey began his pro career in Formula BMW UK in 2004, finishing 22nd. In 2005, he finished second in the Formula Ford Walter Hayes Trophy race and won the BRDC Golden Helmet. In 2006, he finished third in Formula Ford UK and won the Walter Hayes Trophy. In 2007 he won both the Golden Helmet and Walter Hayes Trophy. 2008 saw Dempsey move to the United States to race in Star Mazda for Andersen Racing where he won four races and finished third in points. He also made two starts in the F2000 Championship Series. In 2009, he finished second in Star Mazda for AIM Autosport. He had no full-time drive in 2010 but participated in one American Le Mans Series race (the 2010 Petit Le Mans) and a number of high-profile Formula Ford races in the UK.

Dempsey signed on race in the Firestone Indy Lights series for O2 Racing Technology in 2011. The team left the series amid controversy at the Milwaukee Mile race and missed one race weekend before signing on with Andretti Autosport to continue the season.

Dempsey signed on to return to Indy Lights to race in the 2012 Freedom 100 and the remainder of the 2012 Indy Lights season with Younessi Racing. However, the team left the series after the Detroit race. He was later in the season picked up by Belardi Auto Racing for the last five races of the season and captured three top-5 finishes in those races. He finished 11th in points, ultimately competing in seven of the 12 races. He returns to Belardi in 2013 for a full season in Indy Lights.

Dempsey captured his first and only Indy Lights win in the 2013 Freedom 100 in the closest finish in Indianapolis Motor Speedway history (0.0026 secs) in a four-wide finish.

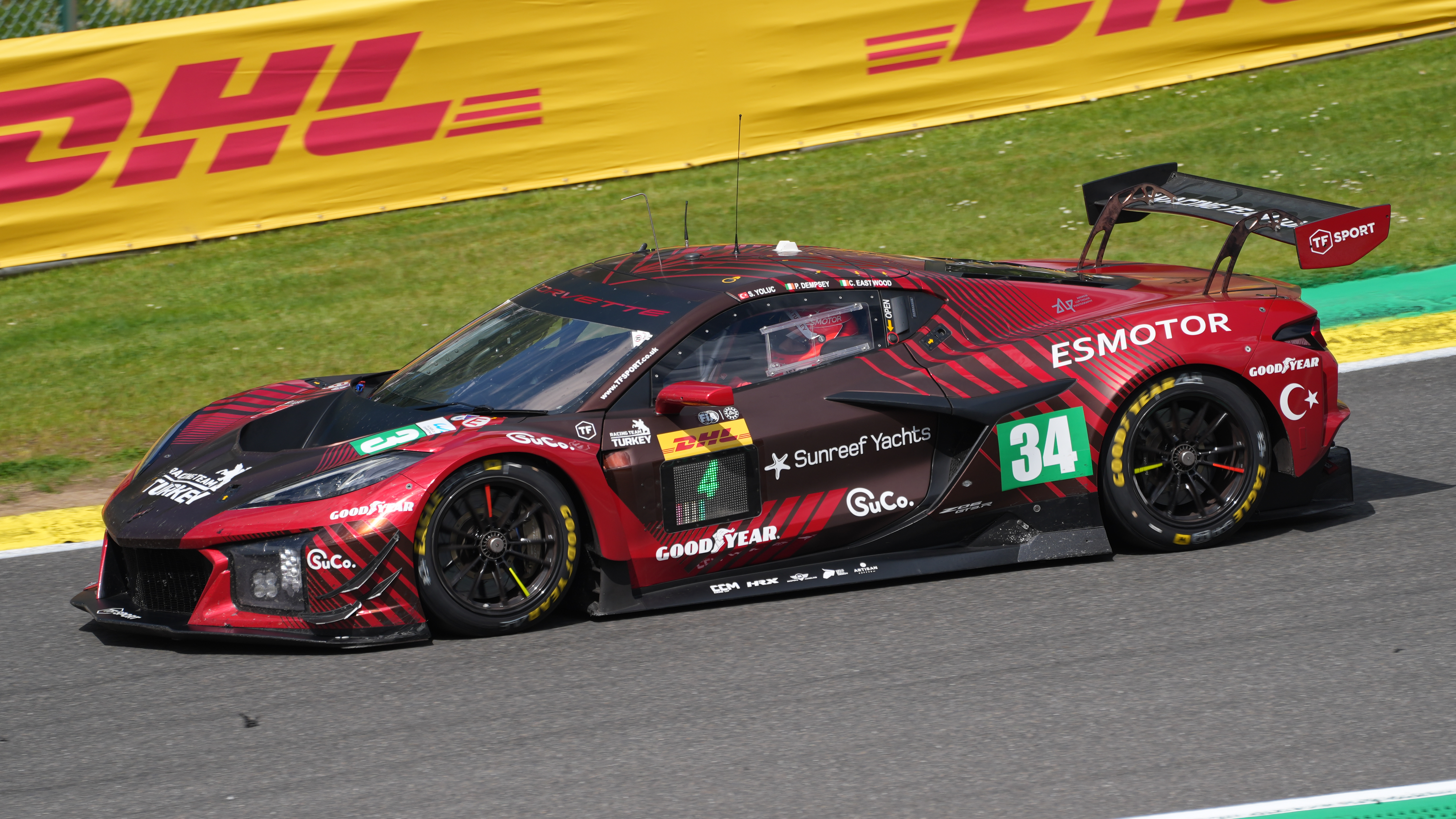
Dempsey's No. 34 Corvette at the 2026 6 Hours of Spa-Francorchamps.

Dempsey returned to racing in 2026 as a bronze-rated driver, joining Racing Team Turkey by TF's Corvette in the FIA World Endurance Championship. After taking his first WEC win at Interlagos, Dempsey also joined Ziggo Sport – Tempesta Racing's Porsche for the remainder of the GT World Challenge Europe season.

Dempsey is the founder and co-owner of Road to Indy outfit Turn 3 Motorsport.

== Racing record ==
=== American open–wheel racing results ===
(key)

==== Star Mazda Championship ====
Year	Team	1	2	3	4	5	6	7	8	9	10	11	12	13	Rank	Points
2008	Andersen Racing	SEB; 3	UTA; 4	WGI; 4	POR; 24	POR; 27	ROA; 1	TRR; 1	MOS; 1	NJ1; 3	NJ2; 1	ATL; 19	LAG; 1		**3rd**	**398**
2009	AIM Autosport	SEB; 6	VIR; 1	MMP; 2	NJ1; 6	NJ2; 7									**2nd**	**461**
2009	Juncos Racing						WIS; 4	**IOW**; 1	**ILL**; 1	**ILL**; 1	QUE; 13	ONT; 4	**ATL**; 1	**LAG**; 23	**2nd**	**461**

==== Indy Lights ====
Year	Team	1	2	3	4	5	6	7	8	9	10	11	12	13	14	Rank	Points	Ref
2011	O2 Racing Technology	STP; 3	ALA; 3	LBH; 17	INDY; 6	MIL; DNS	IOW									10th	264	
2011	Andretti Autosport							TOR; 2	EDM1; 12	EDM2; 3	TRO; 5	NHM	BAL; 9	KTY	LVS	10th	264	
2012	Younessi Racing	STP	ALA	LBH	INDY; 14	DET; 11	MIL	IOW								11th	164	
2012	Belardi Auto Racing								TOR; 4	EDM; 5	TRO; 11	BAL; 5	FON; 12			11th	164	
2013	Belardi Auto Racing	STP; 2	ALA; 6	LBH; 10	INDY; 1	MIL; 6	IOW; 4	POC; 7	TOR; 2	MOH; 2	BAL; 4					5th	360	
2013	Team Moore Racing											HOU; 9	FON			5th	360	

=== Complete FIA World Endurance Championship results ===
(key) (Races in bold indicate pole position; races in italics indicate fastest lap)

Year	Entrant	Class	Chassis	Engine	1	2	3	4	5	6	7	8	Rank	Points
2026	Racing Team Turkey by TF	LMGT3	Chevrolet Corvette Z06 GT3.R	Chevrolet LT6.R 5.5 L V8	IMO; Ret	SPA; 9	LMS; 6	SÃO; 1	COA; 14	FUJ; 3	CAT; 4	MNZ; 11	6th	70

=== Complete 24 Hours of Le Mans results ===
Year	Team	Co-Drivers	Car	Class	Laps	Pos.	Class Pos.
2026	Racing Team Turkey by TF	(Republic of Ireland) Charlie Eastwood (Turkey) Salih Yoluç	Chevrolet Corvette Z06 GT3.R	LMGT3	335	38th	6th

=== Complete GT World Challenge Europe results ===
==== GT World Challenge Europe Endurance Cup ====
(key) (Races in bold indicate pole position) (Races in italics indicate fastest lap)

Year	Team	Car	Class	1	2	3	4	5	6	7	Pos.	Points
2026	AF Corse	Ferrari 296 GT3 Evo	Pro-Am	LEC	MNZ	SPA; 6H; 66†	SPA; 12H; 66†	SPA; 24H; Ret			NC	0
2026	Ziggo Sport - Tempesta Racing	Porsche 911 GT3 R (992.2)	Bronze						NÜR; 31	ALG	27th	12

==== GT World Challenge Europe Sprint Cup ====
(key) (Races in bold indicate pole position) (Races in italics indicate fastest lap)

Year	Team	Car	Class	1	2	3	4	5	6	7	8	Pos.	Points
2026	Ziggo Sport - Tempesta Racing	Porsche 911 GT3 R (992.2)	Bronze	MIS; 1; 35	MIS; 2; 30	MAG; 1; 18	**MAG**; **2**; 28	**ZAN**; **1**; 17	ZAN; 2; 21	CAT; 1; 5	**CAT**; **2**; 20	1st	104

=== Complete Asian Le Mans Series results ===
(key) (Races in bold indicate pole position) (Races in italics indicate fastest lap)

Year	Entrant	Class	Chassis	Engine	1	2	3	4	5	6	Rank	Points
2026–27	AF Corse	GT	Ferrari 296 GT3 Evo	Ferrari F163CE 3.0 L Turbo V6	LEC; 1; 5	**LEC**; **2**; 2	JER; 1	JER; 2	ALG; 1	ALG; 2	2nd*	29*
