= Joel Miller (racing driver) =

American racing driver

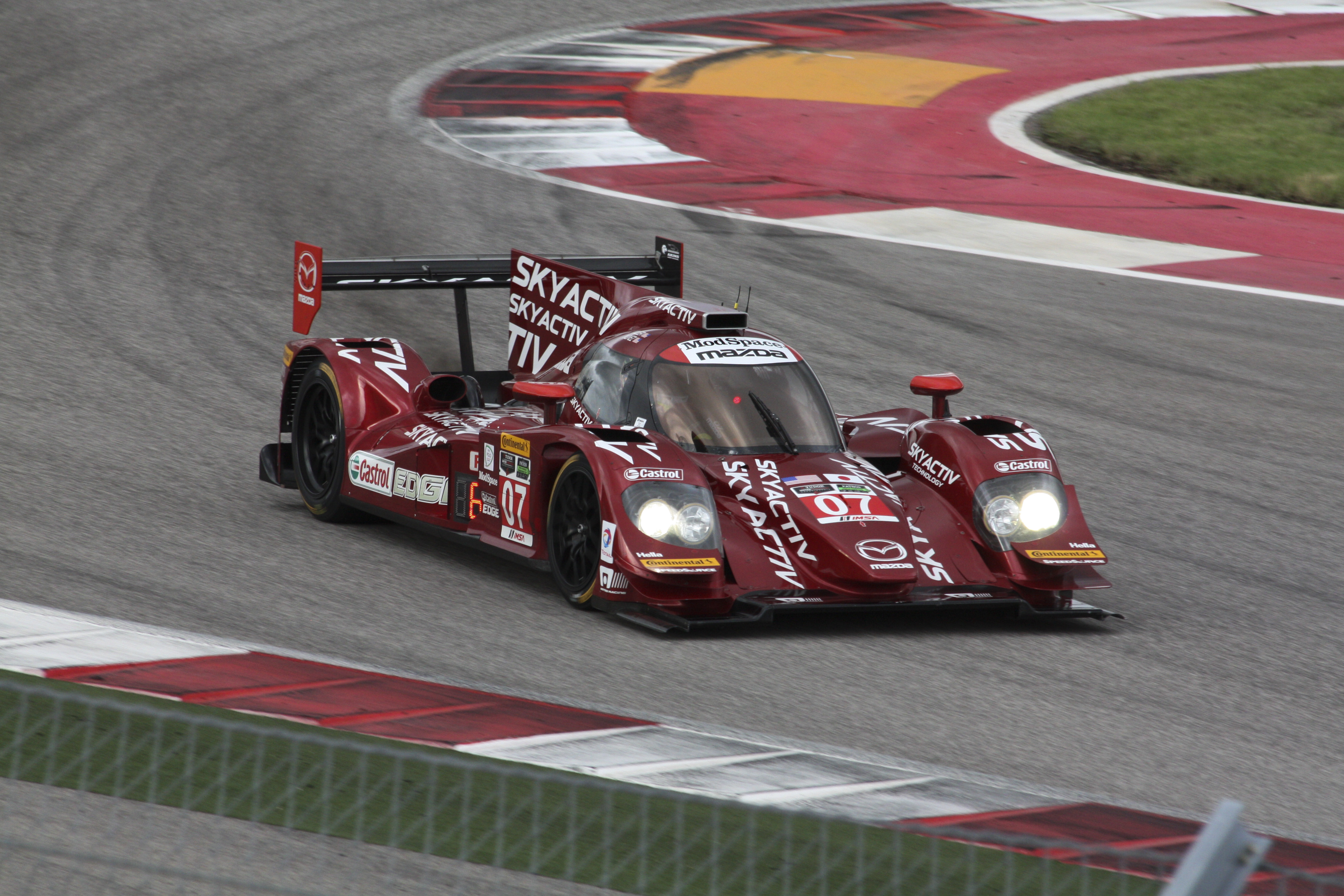
- Miller racing for Mazda in 2014
- Nationality: (United States) American
- Born: May 10, 1988 (age 38) Hesperia, California, United States
- Categorisation: FIA Gold

Joel Miller (born May 10, 1988) is an American auto racing driver from Hesperia, California.

== Racing career ==
Miller began his career in karting winning the Stars of Karting Western ICA Championship in 2005 and the Stars of Karting ICA National Championship in 2006. Miller became one of the few Americans to compete alongside Factory Tony Kart's program in the SKUSA and Stars of Karting Championships. Miller began racing cars in 2004 in the Pacific F2000 Championship, finishing on the podium in three races.

By 2006, Miller had received the Skip Barber Racing National Series Scholarship to compete a full season in the 2007 Skip Barber National Championship. In 2007, he won the Skip Barber National Championship and was awarded the Team USA Scholarship participating in the Formula Palmer Audi Autumn Trophy, in which he finished tenth.

2008 saw Miller compete in the Star Mazda Series for JDC MotorSports where he captured, one win, two poles, and seven podiums on his way to runner-up honors in the overall championship. He returned to Star Mazda in 2009 but only captured three podiums and finished fifth in the points, due to a heavy karting schedule.

Miller made his Firestone Indy Lights debut in April 2010 for Andersen Racing, the third race of the season after extensive pre-season testing with the team, finishing eleventh at the Long Beach Grand Prix after a gearbox failure. Miller returned in August 2010 to compete in his second Firestone Indy Lights race alongside Bryan Herta Autosport at Infineon Raceway for the Carneros 100 to finish ninth after starting from sixteenth on the grid. Miller had qualified in eleventh for the race, however an engine change gave Miller's team a penalty starting him at the back of the grid.

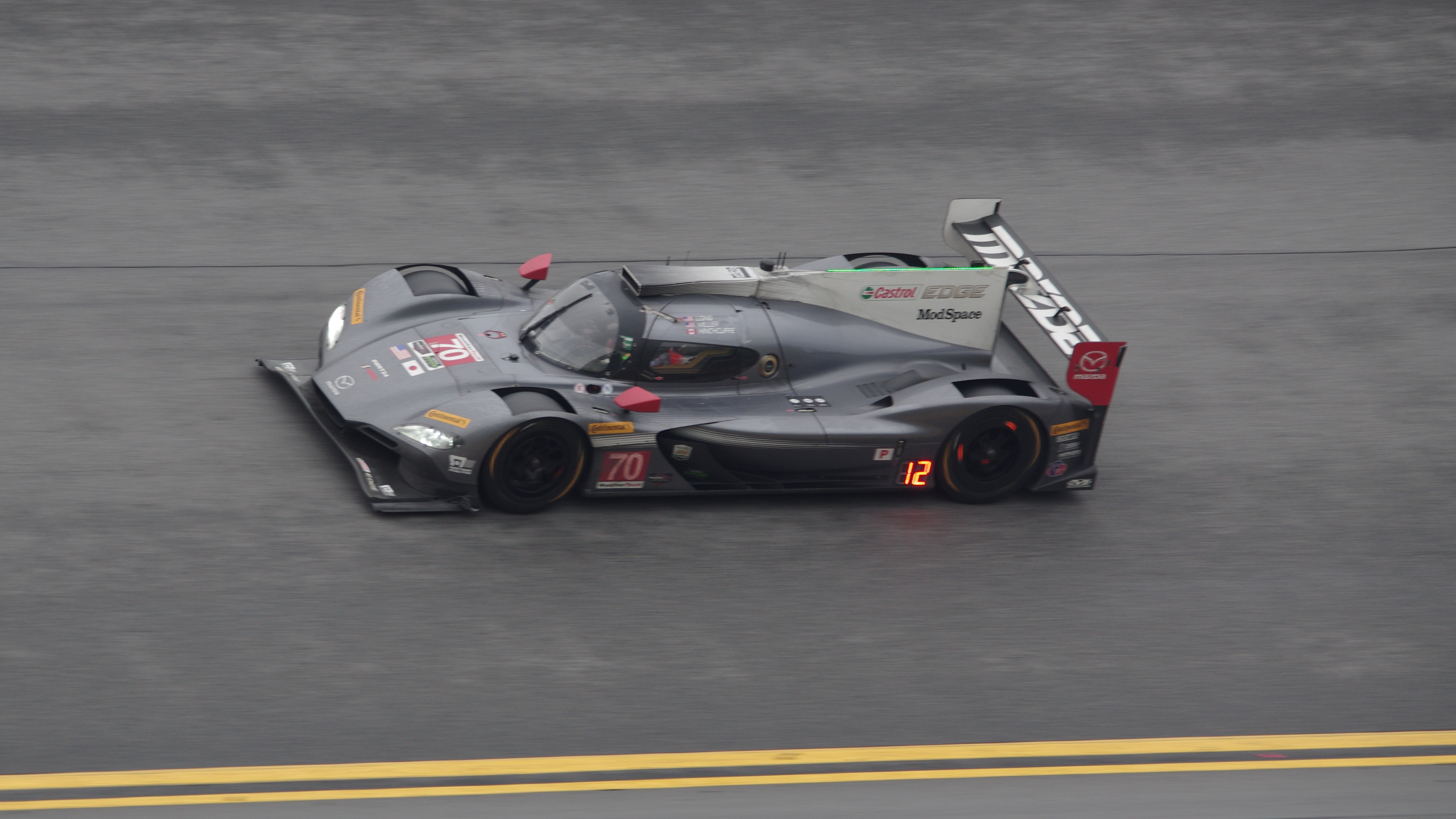
Miller's sole top-class IMSA podium came in Detroit in 2017.

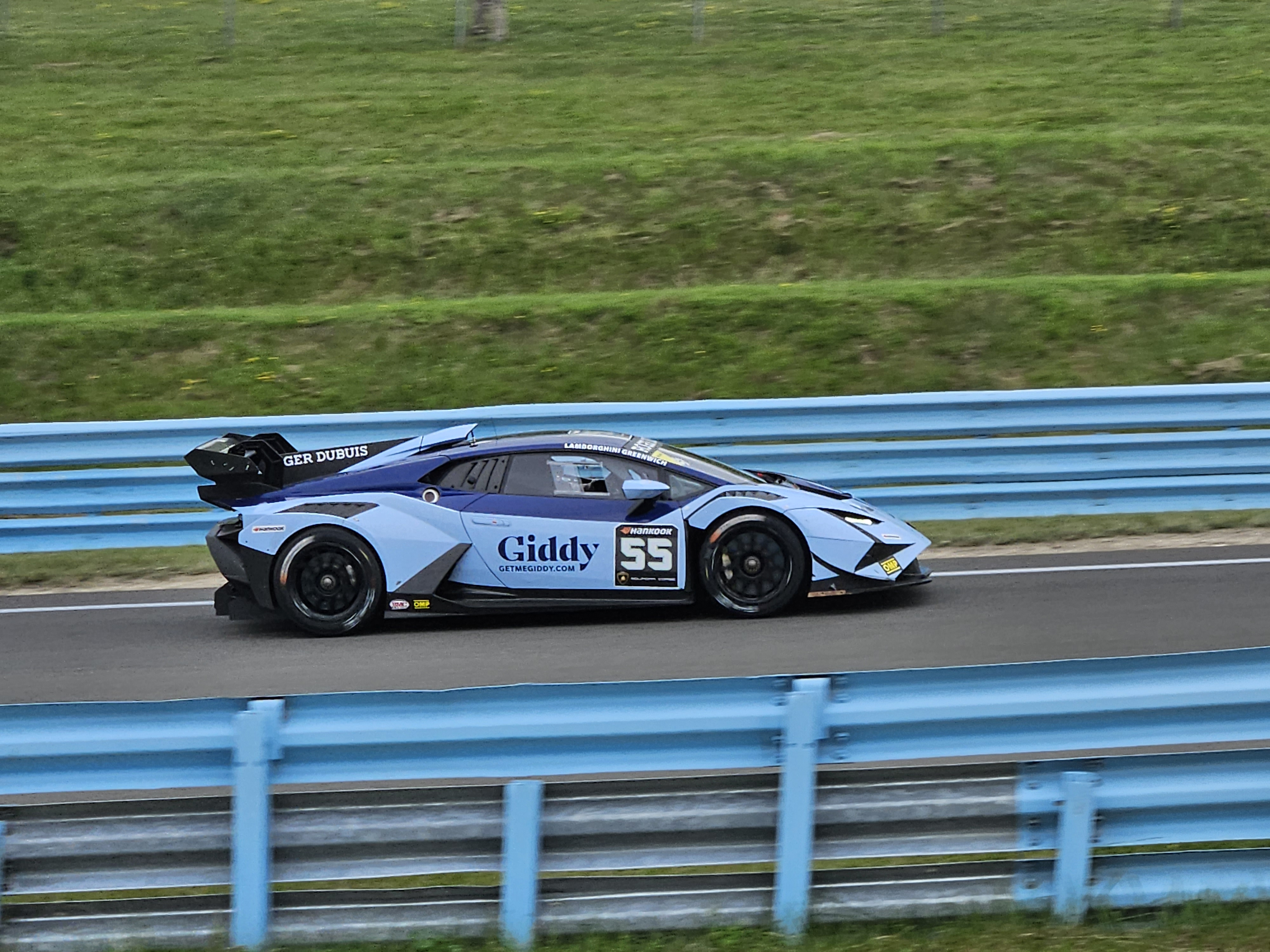
Miller in Lamborghini Super Trofeo in 2023.

Miller also launched The Joel Miller Indy Racing Experience, an event that took place on August 15, 2010, in Santa Cruz, California in which helped raise money for his second Firestone Indy Lights race at Infineon. His management firm brought in several performing artists, exotic cars, motocross demonstrations, celebrities, and a poker tournament for the event.

After a few seasons of one-off races in Firestone Indy Lights, Continental Tire Sports Car Challenge, and the SCCA Pro Racing Playboy Mazda MX-5 Cup, Miller returned to full-time racing in 2013 driving for SpeedSource in the Grand American Rolex Series, in a GX class Mazda6 sedan shared with Tristan Nunez. The pair scored five wins and eight podiums in twelve races. For 2014, Miller continued to co-drive with Nunez as the SpeedSource team moved to the Prototype class in the Tudor United SportsCar Championship. Their new car was a carbon fiber LMP2 class Lola coupe with Mazda Skyactiv diesel power.

== Racing record ==
=== American open–wheel racing ===
(key) (Races in bold indicate pole position; races in italics indicate fastest lap)

==== Star Mazda Championship ====
Year	Team	1	2	3	4	5	6	7	8	9	10	11	12	13	Rank	Points
2008	JDC MotorSports	SEB; 1	UTA; 3	WGI; 2	POR; 22	POR; 3	ROA; 19	TRR; 4	MOS; 2	NJ1; 2	NJ2; 4	ATL; 2	LAG; 4		**2nd**	**406**
2009	JDC MotorSports	SEB; 5	VIR; 3	MMP; 3	NJ1; 5	NJ2; 4	WIS; 14	IOW; 19	ILL; 8	ILL; 4	QUE; 3	ONT; 12	ATL; 4	LAG; 17	**5th**	**390**

==== Indy Lights ====
Year	Team	1	2	3	4	5	6	7	8	9	10	11	12	13	14	Rank	Points
2010	Andersen Racing	STP	ALA	LBH; 11	INDY	IOW	WGL	TOR	EDM	MOH						**23th**	**41**
2010	Bryan Herta Autosport										SNM; 9	CHI	KTY	HMS		**23th**	**41**
2011	Team E	STP; 13	ALA	LBH	INDY	MIL	IOW	TOR	EDM1	EDM2	TRO	NHM	BAL	KTY	LVS	**28th**	**17**

=== IMSA WeatherTech SportsCar Championship series results ===
Year	Team	Class	Make	Engine	1	2	3	4	5	6	7	8	9	10	11	Rank	Points
2014	SpeedSource	P	Mazda Prototype	Mazda 2.2 L SKYACTIV-D (SH-VPTS) I4 Turbo (diesel)	DAY; 13	SIR; 16	LBH; 8	LGA; 12	DET; 8	WGL; 9	MSP; 6	IND; 9	ELK; 9	COA; 9	PET; 11	10th	222
2015	SpeedSource	P	Mazda Prototype	Mazda 2.2 L SKYACTIV-D (SH-VPTS) I4 Turbo (diesel)	DAY; 11	SIR; 11	LBH; 7	LGA; 9	DET; 7	WGL; 5	MSP; 7	ELK; 7	COA; 9	PET; 6		7th	241
2016	Mazda Motorsports	P	Mazda Prototype	Mazda MZ-2.0T 2.0 L I4 Turbo	DAY; 13	SIR; 8	LBH; 4	LAG; 8	DET; 4	WAT; 5	MSP; 5	ELK; 8	COA; 4	PET; 6		6th	258
2017	Mazda Motorsports	P	Mazda RT24-P	Mazda MZ-2.0T 2.0 L Turbo I4	DAY; 12	SEB; 8	LBH; 6	COA; 8	DET; 3	WGL; 9	MOS; 5	ELK	LGA	PET		11th	168
2018	Performance Tech Motorsports	P	Oreca 07	Gibson GK428 4.2 L V8	DAY; 8	SEB	LBH	MOH	DET	WGL; 14	MOS	ELK	LGA	PET		42nd	40
2022	Mühlner Motorsports America	LMP3	Duqueine M30 - D08	Nissan VK56DE 5.6 L V8	DAY; 9	SEB	MOH	WGL	MOS	ELK	PET					NC†	0†
2025	Triarsi Competizione	GTD	Ferrari 296 GT3	Ferrari F163CE 3.0 L Turbo V6	DAY	SEB	LBH	LGA	WGL	MOS	ELK	VIR	IMS; 8	PET		70th	250

^{†} Points only counted towards the Michelin Endurance Cup, and not the overall LMP3 Championship.
