= 2008 Star Mazda Championship =

Seasons
- ← 2007 2009 →

The 2008 Star Mazda Championship was a season of the open wheel racing series the Star Mazda Championship. It consisted of a 12-race schedule beginning in March and ending in October, with only the best eleven race results counting towards the championship. As with 2007, the series featured races exclusively on road and street courses. In addition to the main championship that is typically tested by young, developing drivers, there were also additional class titles for older drivers.

John Edwards won the championship ahead of Joel Miller and Peter Dempsey despite missing the first round of the championship. Edwards won four races, the same as Dempsey, but Dempsey had three finishes of 20th or worse, one of which counted in his points total, while Edwards worst points-scoring finish was 4th. Miller won only once, in the season opener. Noted British drivers Charles Hall and Tom Gladdis also participated in the series and finished fifth and sixth in points, respectively. Each won a single race. British driver Richard Kent won the final race of the season in his series debut, despite not being registered for the championship. Notable international female drivers Natalia Kowalska and Michele Bumgarner also competed in the series despite not being registered for the championship.

Chris Cumming won the Expert class for drivers 30 and older and Chuck Hulse won the Masters class championship for drivers 40 and older.

== Race calendar and results ==
Round	Circuit	Location	Date	Pole position	Fastest lap	Winning driver	Winning team	Supporting
1	(United States) Sebring International Raceway	Sebring, Florida	March 14	(United States) Joel Miller	(United Kingdom) Tom Gladdis	(United States) Joel Miller	JDC MotorSports	American Le Mans Series
2	(United States) Miller Motorsports Park	Tooele, Utah	May 17	(United States) John Edwards	(United States) John Edwards	(United States) John Edwards	AIM Autosport	American Le Mans Series
3	(United States) Watkins Glen International	Watkins Glen, New York	June 7	(United States) Alex Ardoin	(United Kingdom) Charles Hall	(United Kingdom) Charles Hall	Andersen Racing	Grand Am Rolex Sports Cars
4	(United States) Portland International Raceway	Portland, Oregon	July 26	(United Kingdom) Tom Gladdis	(United Kingdom) Tom Gladdis	(United Kingdom) Tom Gladdis	Andersen Racing	stand-alone
5	(United States) Portland International Raceway	Portland, Oregon	July 27	(United Kingdom) Tom Gladdis	(United Kingdom) Tom Gladdis	(United States) John Edwards	AIM Autosport	stand-alone
6	(United States) Road America	Elkhart Lake, Wisconsin	August 9	(United States) John Edwards	(Republic of Ireland) Peter Dempsey	(Republic of Ireland) Peter Dempsey	Andersen Racing	American Le Mans Series
7	(Canada) Circuit Trois-Rivières	Trois-Rivières, Quebec	August 17	(Republic of Ireland) Peter Dempsey	(Republic of Ireland) Peter Dempsey	(Republic of Ireland) Peter Dempsey	Andersen Racing	stand-alone
8	(Canada) Mosport International Raceway	Bowmanville, Ontario	August 23	(United States) John Edwards	(Republic of Ireland) Peter Dempsey	(Republic of Ireland) Peter Dempsey	Andersen Racing	American Le Mans Series
9	(United States) New Jersey Motorsports Park	Millville, New Jersey	September 13	(United States) Joel Miller	(United States) John Edwards	(United States) John Edwards	AIM Autosport	stand-alone
10	(United States) New Jersey Motorsports Park	Millville, New Jersey	September 14	(United States) John Edwards	(Republic of Ireland) Peter Dempsey	(Republic of Ireland) Peter Dempsey	Andersen Racing	stand-alone
11	(United States) Road Atlanta	Braselton, Georgia	October 3	(Republic of Ireland) Peter Dempsey	(Republic of Ireland) Peter Dempsey	(United States) John Edwards	AIM Autosport	American Le Mans Series
12	(United States) Mazda Raceway Laguna Seca	Monterey, California	October 18	(Republic of Ireland) Peter Dempsey	not available	(United Kingdom) Richard Kent	Andersen Racing	American Le Mans Series

== Championship standings ==
=== Driver's ===
Pos	Driver	SEB (United States)	SLC (United States)	WGL (United States)	POR (United States)		ROA (United States)	TRO (Canada)	MOS (Canada)	NJ (United States)		ATL (United States)	LAG (United States)	Points
Overall
1	(United States) John Edwards		**1**	6	26	1	**2**	2	**4**	1	**3**	1	2	422
2	(United States) Joel Miller	**1**	3	2	22	3	19	4	2	**2**	4	2	4	406
3	(Republic of Ireland) Peter Dempsey	3	4	4	24	27	1	**1**	1	3	1	**19**	3	398
4	(United States) Alex Ardoin	4	10	**3**	2	6	4	3	5	23	2	18	5	365
5	(United Kingdom) Charles Hall	2	2	1	29	4	3	5	19	6	5	22		342
6	(United Kingdom) Tom Gladdis	5	5		**1**	**2**	5	8	3	5	13	8		334
7	(United States) Billy Goshen	10	8	5	3	5	14	19	7	12	6	7	7	324
8	(Brazil) Caio Lara	12	28	22	10	11	8	7	8	16	14	6	6	286
9	(United States) Kristy Kester	8	18	13	4	12	7	17	12	13	12	16	10	284
10	(Canada) Taylor Hacquard	9	6	18	5	10	22	10	20	9	11	10	20	281
11	(United States) Scott Rettich	14	24	15	23	18	6	9	21	7	8	5	22	269
12	(Canada) Chris Cumming	17	15	11	6	8	24	11	13	21	10	17	21	259
13	(United States) Jeffery Kester	16	25	20	9	9	20	15	9	8	9	20	19	259
14	(United States) Chuck Hulse	18	26	14	13	16	11	12	16	11	15	12	11	259
15	(Brazil) Ernesto Otero	26	13	8	8	7	8	6	6	20	23			243
16	(United States) J. W. Roberts	21	19	23	16	20	16	14	14	19	22	14	14	230
17	(United States) Rusty Mitchell				19	13	21	20	11	14	18	13	9	203
18	(United States) Gerry Kraut	19	17	17	12	28	12		15			11	24	192
19	(Brazil) Rick Rosin	20	14	10						15	16	3	8	176
20	(United States) Phil Fogg, Jr.		11		14	14		16	18				13	135
21	(United States) Michael Guasch		29		11	22				17	19		16	106
22	(United States) Richard Zober		22	16			17			22	17			99
23	(United States) Mike Hill	13	9	7										79
24	(United States) Eric Freiberg	11	7	21										71
25	(United States) Chris Hundley											15	18	45
26	(United States) Nick Haye	6												30
27	(United States) John Zartarian	7												29
28	(Mexico) Juliana González	15												21
29	(Puerto Rico) Carlos Conde								17					20
30	(United States) Cody Jolly		27											14
30	(United States) Keith Young	22												14
32	(United States) Dan Tomlin, III	23												13
33	(United States) Dan Tomlin, Jr.	24												12
34	(Canada) Yannick Hoffman	25												11
Expert class
1	(Canada) Chris Cumming	17	15	11	6	8	24	11	13	21	10	17	21	188
2	(United States) J. W. Roberts	21	19	23	16	20	16	14	14	19	22	14	14	166
3	(United States) Phil Fogg, Jr.		11		14	14		16	18				13	100
4	(United States) Richard Zober		22	16			17			22	17			74
5	(United States) Dan Tomlin, III	23												14
Masters class
1	(United States) Chuck Hulse	18	26	14	13	16	11	12	16	11	15	12	11	192
2	(United States) Gerry Kraut	19	17	17	12	28	12		15			11	24	150
3	(United States) Michael Guasch		29		11	22				17	19		16	84
4	(United States) Chris Hundley											15	18	28
5	(Puerto Rico) Carlos Conde								18					14
5	(United States) Keith Young	22												14
6	(United States) Dan Tomlin, Jr.	24												12
Unregistered drivers
	(United Kingdom) Richard Kent												**1**	
	(Finland) Valle Mäkelä									4	7	21		
	(Canada) Kyle Marcelli											4		
	(United States) Patrick O'Neill		16		7	17				18	21		15	
	(United Kingdom) Jonny Baker		12	9									23	
	(United States) Court Vernon											9		
	(Poland) Natalia Kowalska			12	30	29	13	13	10					
	(Chile) Kevin Toledo									10	20			
	(United States) Bobby Caldwell						10							
	(United States) Ron White												12	
	(Philippines) Michele Bumgarner	27	20	19	27	15								
	(United States) David House		23		15	21							25	
	(United States) Bob Kaminsky						15							
	(United States) Frank McCormick				17	24							17	
	(United States) Dave Mundy				21		18							
	(United States) Michael Gesser				18	25								
	(United States) Stan Kohls		21		20	19								
	(United States) Brian Johnson				25	23								
	(United States) Jason Vinkemulder						23							
	(United States) Pedro Serramalera				28	26								

Color	Result
Gold	Winner
Silver	2nd place
Bronze	3rd place
Green	4th & 5th place
Light Blue	6th–10th place
Dark Blue	Finished (Outside Top 10)
Purple	Did not finish
Red	Did not qualify (DNQ)
Brown	Withdrawn (Wth)
Black	Disqualified (DSQ)
White	Did not start (DNS)
Blank	Did not participate (DNP)
Blank	Not competing

**In-line notation**
**Bold**	Pole position (1 point)
Italics	Ran fastest race lap

Note: Expert and Masters classes have different point system than the overall championship.
