= 2017 24 Hours of Daytona =

Auto race in Florida

Previous: 2016	Next: 2018
Index: Races | Winners

Daytona International Speedway road course

The 55th Rolex 24 at Daytona was an International Motor Sports Association (IMSA)-sanctioned 24-hour automobile endurance race for prototype and grand touring sports cars held at the Daytona International Speedway combined road course in Daytona Beach, Florida, from January 28 to 29, 2017. It was the first of twelve events in the 2017 IMSA SportsCar Championship, the 55th 24 Hours of Daytona, and the first in the four-round North American Endurance Cup.

João Barbosa started from the pole position for Mustang Sampling Racing by lapping quickest in qualifying and held the lead for most of the opening hour until teammate Dane Cameron of Whelen Engineering Racing passed him. Wayne Taylor Racing joined in, trading the lead with the Mustang Sampling Racing, VisitFlorida Racing, Extreme Speed Motorsports, and Whelen Engineering Racing teams. Ricky Taylor collided with Filipe Albuquerque with around seven minutes to go, spinning out the latter. Taylor subsequently built a large lead while Albuquerque began to track him down. On the final lap of the race, Albuquerque reduced Taylor's lead by four seconds but was unable to reach Taylor in time to win the race. Max Angelelli, Jeff Gordon, and Jordan Taylor joined Ricky Taylor after 659 laps to lead in the Prototype Drivers' and Teams' Championships. VisitFlorida Racing's Marc Goossens, René Rast and Renger van der Zande completed the podium one lap behind in third.

The Prototype Challenge (PC) category was won by the Performance Tech Motorsports Oreca FLM09 vehicle, shared by Nicholas Boulle, James French, Kyle Masson, and Pato O'Ward after leading the category's final 514 laps. BAR1 Motorsport's No. 26 entry finished 22 laps behind in second place; third was the sister BAR1 car. Ford Chip Ganassi Racing won the Grand Touring Le Mans (GTLM) category with a Ford GT shared by Sébastien Bourdais, Joey Hand, and Dirk Müller by 2.988 seconds over a Porsche 911 RSR that defeated the third-place Risi Competizione Ferrari 488 GTE by 0.091 seconds. The Alegra Motorsports team of Michael Christensen, Carlos de Quesada, Michael de Quesada, Jesse Lazare, and Daniel Morad won the Grand Touring Daytona (GTD) class in a Porsche 911 GT3 R by 0.293 seconds after Christensen overtook Montaplast by Land-Motorsport's Audi R8 LMS in the race's final hour. The Riley Motorsports – Team AMG-fielded Mercedes-AMG GT3 completed the class podium in third place.

== Background ==
=== Preview ===
Daytona International Speedway, where the race was held

NASCAR founder Bill France Sr., who built Daytona International Speedway in 1959, conceived of the 24 Hours of Daytona to attract European sports-car endurance racing to the United States and provide international exposure to the speedway. It is informally considered part of the Triple Crown of Endurance Racing, with the 12 Hours of Sebring and the 24 Hours of Le Mans.

International Motor Sports Association (IMSA) president Scott Atherton confirmed that the race was part of the 2017 IMSA SportsCar Championship schedule in August 2016. It was the fourth year in a row that the race was part of the series calendar and the 55th 24 Hours of Daytona. The race was the first of 2017's twelve scheduled IMSA automobile endurance races, and the first of four North American Endurance Cup (NAEC) events. It was held at the 12-turn, 3.56-mile (5.73 km) Daytona International Speedway in Daytona Beach, Florida, from January 28 to 29.

=== Entry list ===
Fifty-five cars were entered in the race, and most entries were in the Grand Touring Daytona (GTD) class. Extreme Speed Motorsports (ESM), the 2016 winners, returned to defend its title. Daytona marked the debut of IMSA's Daytona Prototype International (DPi) cars, replacing the Daytona Prototype (DP), competing with the revised Automobile Club de l'Ouest-regulated Le Mans Prototype 2 (LMP2) cars in the Prototype category. Wayne Taylor Racing (WTR), Mustang Sampling Racing and Whelen Engineering Racing (WER) each fielded one Cadillac DPi-V.R car, and ESM entered two Nissan Onroak DPi vehicles. Mazda Motorsports sent two Mazda RT24-P chassis, and VisitFlorida Racing entered one Riley Mk. 30 LMP2-specification car. Oreca was represented by three 07-Gibson cars, with one each fielded by JDC-Miller Motorsports (moving from the Prototype Challenge (PC) class), DragonSpeed and Daytona first-timer Rebellion Racing. The PC category was composed of five Oreca FLM09s: two each from BAR1 Motorsports and Starworks Motorsport and one from Performance Tech Motorsports.

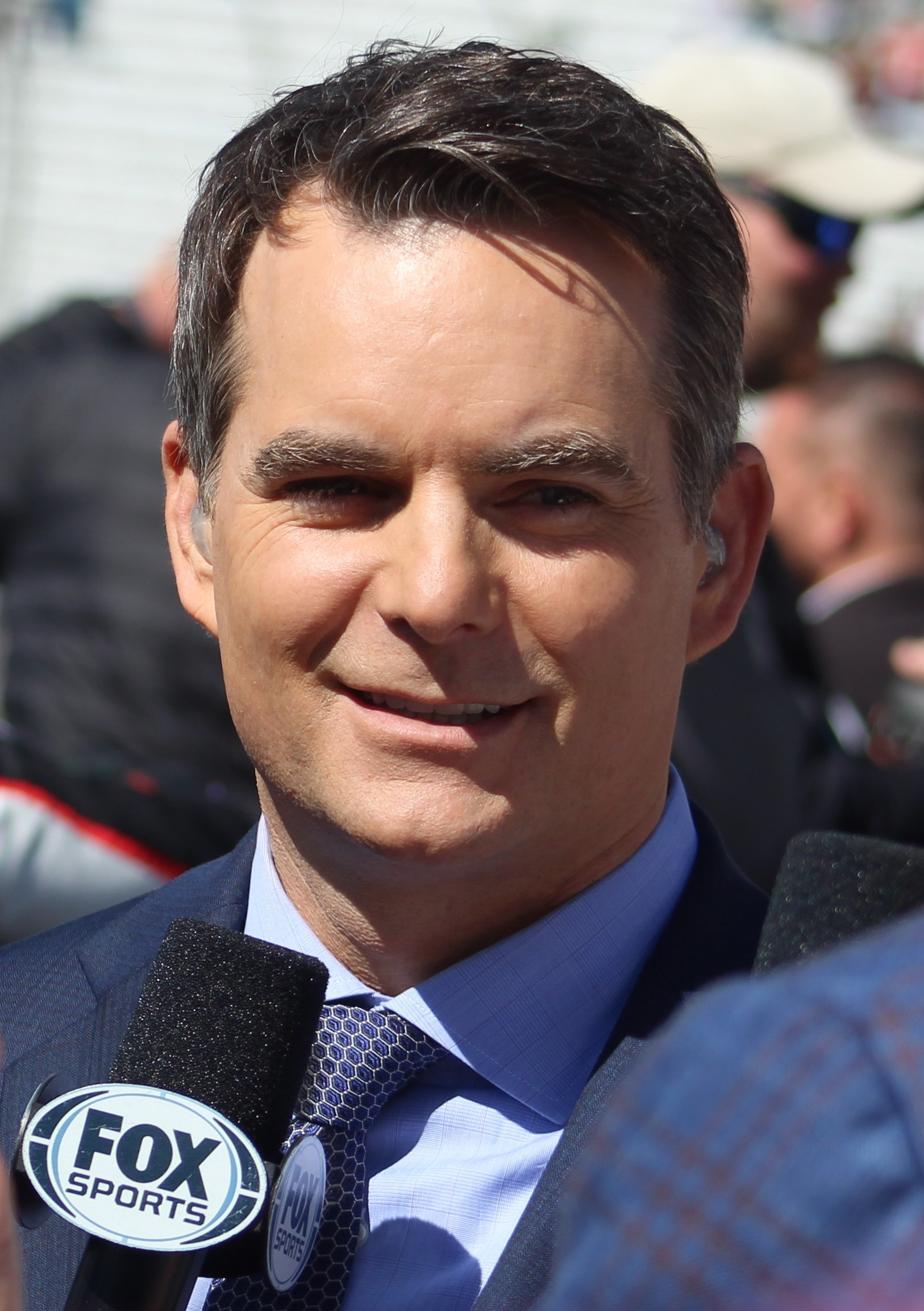
Jeff Gordon made a one-off appearance at Daytona for Wayne Taylor Racing.

GT Le Mans (GTLM) consisted of 11 vehicles from five brands. Porsche's GT Team debuted the mid-engine 911 RSR, and Ford Chip Ganassi Racing (CGR) and its UK division each fielded two Ford GT. Team RLL entered two BMW M6 GTLMs, and Corvette Racing fielded two C7.Rs. Ferrari was represented by a Ferrari 488 GTE, fielded by Risi Competizione. GTD had 27 entrants from nine GT3 manufacturers. Lamborghini was the most-numerous brand in GTD, with eight Huracáns: two from GRT Grasser Racing Team, and one each from Change Racing, DAC Motorsports, Dream Racing Competition, Ebimotors, Konrad Motorsport and Paul Miller Racing. Porsche was represented by five 911 GT3 Rs, with one each from Alegra Motorsports, CORE Autosport, Manthey Racing, Park Place Motorsports and The Racer's Group. A mix of teams and brands made up the rest of the GTD field. They included three Audi R8 LMS (one each from Alex Job Racing, Montaplast by Land-Motorsport and Stevenson Motorsports) and three Mercedes-AMG GT3s from Riley Motorsports – Team AMG, Riley Motorsports – WeatherTech Racing and SunEnergy1 Racing. Michael Shank Racing joined Acura for two debuting Acura NSX GT3, and 3GT Racing gave two Lexus RC F GT3s their competition debut at Daytona. Scuderia Corsa and Spirit of Race entered one Ferrari 488 GT3 apiece. There was one Vantage GT3 from Aston Martin Racing and one BMW M6 GT3 from Turner Motorsport.

Each car was driven by two full-time entrants, along with one endurance racer and one or two extra competitors. The additional participants were recruited from a number of racing categories, including the FIA World Endurance Championship (such as Neel Jani for Rebellion Racing and Brendon Hartley for ESM), the Supercars Championship (such as Shane van Gisbergen for Riley Motorsports – WeatherTech Racing), the IndyCar Series (such as Scott Dixon for CGR and James Hinchcliffe for Mazda Motorsports), the Deutsche Tourenwagen Masters (such as Robert Wickens for Starworks Motorsport), and Super GT (such as Andrea Caldarelli for Paul Miller Racing). Some drivers competed at Daytona on a one-off basis, such as four-time NASCAR Cup Series champion Jeff Gordon and Formula E racer Sam Bird. Seb Morris joined WER after winning the Sunoco Whelen Challenge for British GT Championship, Radical Team Challenge and Radical European Masters entrants.

=== Pre-test balance of performance ===
The week before the circuit's three-day test session, IMSA altered the balance of performance in all four categories to achieve parity. All Prototype entries had 930 kg (2,050 lb) of baseline weight and 75-litre (16 imp gal; 20 US gal) fuel-cell capacity. The PC category had no performance changes. The Ford GT received a boost-ratio-curve increase to ease performance, the Aston Martin Vantage had 50 kilograms (110 lb) of minimum weight added for heavier handling, and the Lamborghini Huracán's power was reduced by a 1-millimetre (0.039 in) air-restrictor reduction to two 39-millimetre (1.5 in) openings. All DPi cars had their performance increased; the Mazda RT24-P and Nissan Onroak DPis received turbocharger-boost increases across all RPM ranges, and the Cadillac DPi-V.R. had its air restrictor increased by 1.2 mm (0.047 in). The Ligier JS P217, Oreca 07 or Riley Mk. 30 LMP2 machines had no performance changes. The GTLM-category Porsche 911 RSR had its minimum rear-wing angle set at zero degrees. The GTD and PC classes had no performance alterations.

== Testing ==
The 55 entries participated in a seven-session, three-day test at Daytona from January 6 to 8 as race preparation. Some drivers, including Corey Lewis, Matt McMurry, Gustavo Menezes and Alessandro Pier Guidi, missed the test because they were racing in the Asian Le Mans Series's 4 Hours of Thailand. The first day saw warm temperatures and low winds. Neel Jani set the first session's best lap (1:39.164) in Rebellion's No. 13 Oreca car, improving by 0.004 seconds in the second session. Mathias Beche was second in JDC-Miller's No. 85 entry. The fastest DPi car was WTR's No. 10 Ricky Taylor Cadillac in third, followed by José Gutiérrez's PR1/Mathiasen No. 52 Ligier and Nicolas Lapierre's No. 81 DragonSpeed Oreca in fourth and fifth. Johnny Mowlem's No. 26 BAR1 Oreca car led PC with a 1:42.701 lap. A crash by Clark Toppe in Performance Tech's No. 38 car against the Bus Stop chicane barrier heavily damaged the car after an hour, but Toppe was uninjured. Jan Magnussen led the morning session in GTLM with a 1:44.760 lap in Corvette's No. 3 C7.R, and continued to lead in the afternoon session over Dirk Müller's and Andy Priaulx's Nos. 66 and 67 Fords. Andrew Davis' No. 57 Stevenson Audi led GTD.

Jani again set the fastest overall lap (1:38.944) on the second day; Tristan Nunez's No. 55 Mazda was second, Ben Hanley's DragonSpeed car was third, and JDC-Miller's Oreca car was fourth. WTR's Cadillac, driven by Jordan Taylor, finished fifth. Pato O'Ward led in PC at 1:43.119 driving Performance Tech's car. Dixon's No. 67 Ford led in GTLM with a 1:44.558 lap during the afternoon session, two-tenths of a second faster than Magnunssen's second-placed No. 3 Corvette. A serious fire, caused by a fuel line (allowing fuel to escape and ignite on the warm engine compartment), in Corvette's No. 4 C7.R driven by Marcel Fässler into NASCAR turn two caused him to stop in the infield with front left-corner damage. Fässler, evaluated and released from the infield medical center, was unhurt. Corvette Racing withdrew from the test to investigate the fire's cause. Christopher Mies' No. 29 Land Audi lapped at 1:47.723 to lead GTD. A stop on the track by João Barbosa's No. 5 Mustang Sampling Cadillac and a collision between Patrick Pilet's No. 911 Porsche and the No. 98 Aston Martin, which damaged Pilet's left front suspension, disrupted the test.

The third and final day saw DragonSpeed's Hanley lap fastest overall (1:38.343), 0.020 seconds faster than Jonathan Bomarito's second-place No. 55 Mazda. Sébastien Buemi placed the Rebellion Oreca third; the PR1/Matheisen car finished fourth, and Barbosa's Mustang Sampling Cadillac was the fastest DPi entry in fifth place. Performance Tech continued to lead in PC after a lap by James French. GTLM was led by Ryan Briscoe's No. 67 Ford with a 1:44.380 lap, two-tenths of a second faster than Tony Kanaan's second-place sister No. 69 car. Sven Müller lapped fastest in GTD (1:46.810) in Manthey's No. 59 Porsche in the morning session, a tenth of a second quicker than Jeroen Bleekemolen's second-place No. 33 Riley Mercedes-AMG.

== Post-test balance of performance ==
After testing, IMSA again adjusted the balance of performance in all categories. The Mazda RT24-P and Nissan Onroak DPis had their fuel tanks raised, and the Mazda and Riley Mk. 30s received minimum main-plane angles for two approved rear-wing choices. Cadillac's DPi-V.R.s rear wing assembly was moved back two degrees. The PC cars had decreased fuel capacity and shorter hose restrictors. All five GTLM cars had minimum rear-wing angles altered and refueling flow restrictors installed. All GTD-class machinery received weight adjustments. The Audi R8 LMS, Lamborghini Huracán, Porsche 911 R and Mercedes-AMGs had their performance decreased with air-restrictor reductions, and the fuel capacities of the Lamborghini, Lexus and Mercedes-AMG cars were reduced. All nine GTD cars had refueling flow restrictors installed.

== Practice and qualifying ==
Four practice sessions preceded the race's start on Saturday: three on Thursday and one on Friday. The first two one-hour sessions were on Thursday morning and afternoon. The third, that evening, lasted 90 minutes; the fourth, on Friday morning, lasted an hour.

The weather was cloudy for the first session. Cadillacs led, with the best lap set by Mustang Sampling's Christian Fittipaldi (1:38.196); this broke Alex Gurney's 2014 DP class record, and was 0.792 seconds faster than second-place WTR's Ricky Taylor. Mike Conway was third in WER's No. 31 car. The quickest LMP2 lap was set by Hanley in DragonSpeed's fourth-place entry, and Beche's JDC-Miller car was fifth. Stéphane Sarrazin stopped his Rebellion Oreca on the bank (also stopping practice with 15 minutes left) and was able to return to the pit lane. The five-vehicle PC class was led by BAR1's No. 20 Oreca, driven by Gustavo Yacamán, with a time of 1:43.668. The quickest GTLM entry was the No. 68 Ford of Olivier Pla, whose 1:44.755 lap led Laurens Vanthoor's second-place No. 912 RSR Porsche. With a 1:47.778 lap, Alessandro Balzan led the 27-car GTD class in Scuderia Corsa's No. 63 Ferrari by a tenth of a second over Christian Engelhart's No. 61 GRT Lamborghini.

In the second session, Barbosa's Mustang Sampling car lapped quickest at 1:38.549, 0.177 seconds ahead of WTR's Ricky Taylor in second and WER's Dane Cameron in third. Orecas followed in fourth to sixth place with Loïc Duval's DragonSpeed, JDC-Miller's Stephen Simpson and Rebellion's Jani. ESM's No. 22 Nissan, driven by Johannes van Overbeek, ran out of fuel entering the backstraight and was moved to the pit lane during a red flag period. A spin by Duval into the turn-one inside exit barrier gave DragonSpeed's car major left-side damage and ended practice with five minutes left. Johnny Mowlem led PC with a 1:44.175 lap in BAR1's No. 26 Oreca, and O'Ward's Performance Tech car was second. Pla's 1:44.245 lap (set with about ten minutes left) led the GTLM class in Ford's No. 66 car, almost three-tenths of a second faster than Toni Vilander's Risi Ferrari; Bill Auberlen's No. 19 BMW was third. GTD saw Patrick Lindsey's No. 73 Park Place Porsche record the quickest class lap: 1:47.135, 0.059 seconds faster than Pier Guidi's No. 51 Spirit of Race Ferrari.

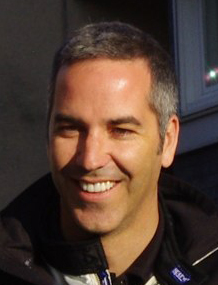
João Barbosa had the fastest overall lap time to get the pole position for Mustang Sampling Racing.

In Thursday afternoon's 90-minute four-group qualifying, each category had separate 15-minute sessions. Regulations stipulated that teams nominate one qualifying driver, with the fastest laps determining each class's starting order. IMSA arranged the grid to put Prototypes ahead of the PC, GTLM and GTD cars. Barbosa received his first career pole position with a 1:36.903 class lap record in Mustang Sampling's Cadillac. His teammate Cameron qualified the sister WER entry 0.072 seconds slower in second, and Jani's third-place Rebellion entry was the fastest Oreca car late in the session. WTR's Ricky Taylor had the pole position for most of qualifying before Jani's lap demoted him to fourth. The ESM duo of Hartley and Ryan Dalziel qualified fifth and sixth. The DragonSpeed Oreca did not participate in qualifying because the team received permission from IMSA to switch to the spare tub from their spare car to replace the one damaged beyond repair by Duval's second-practice-session accident.

French took the PC pole position for Performance Tech with a 1:42.559 time, set on his final lap with five minutes left. Mowlem qualified the No. 26 BAR1 entry second, and Buddy Rice's sister No. 20 car was third after leading the class for most of the session. Ford took the first three GTLM positions, led by its No. 66 car driven by Joey Hand (whose benchmark time of 1:43.473 was 0.231 seconds faster than Richard Westbrook's second-place No. 67 entry); Pla's No. 68 car was third. Pla avoided damaging his car on the tire barrier at the International Horseshoe with less than five minutes left. The fastest Porsche was Pilet's No. 911 RSR in fourth, and the highest-placed Ferrari was Vilander's fifth-place No. 62 488 GTE. Ferrari qualified first and second in GTD, led by Spirit of Race's Pier Guidi (1:47.099) over Scuderia Corsa's Balzan by 0.018 seconds after Balzan's final lap was slower. Marco Sørensen qualified the Aston Martin third, ahead of Matteo Cairoli's fourth-place Manthey Porsche and Mirko Bortolotti's fifth-place No. 11 GRT Lamborghini.

The third practice session saw Max Angelelli lap quickest for WRT at 1:37.757, 0.148 seconds ahead of Barbosa. ESM was third and fourth after laps by Hartley and Scott Sharp, with WER's Cameron fifth. Gordon caused a stoppage early when he lost control of WTR's car. O'Ward led in PC with a 1:43.634 lap in Performance Tech's car, 0.824 seconds ahead of Remo Ruscitti in Starworks' second-place No. 8 entry. A 1:44.242 lap saw Briscoe's No. 67 Ford lead GTLM over Kévin Estre's No. 912 Porsche and Dirk Werner's No. 911 Porsche by less than a tenth of a second. Porsche paced GTD with Park Place's 911 of Jörg Bergmeister lapping 1:48.084, ahead of Robert Alon's No. 15 3GT Lexus. Jeroen Mul stopped the No. 16 Change Lamborghini on the track entering the Bus Stop chicane with half an hour left, red-flagging the practice again.

In the last practice session, Jordan Taylor went fastest for WTR (1:36.790 on his final lap). Lapierre's rebuilt DragonSpeed Oreca was second, followed by Mustang Sampling's Fittipaldi in third. Rebellion was fourth after a lap by Jani, and René Rast's VisitFlorida Racing's No. 90 Cadillac was fifth. Yacamán's No. 20 BAR1 Oreca led PC with a 1:43.164 lap, faster than Wickens' No. 8 Starworks vehicle. Hand's No. 66 Ford paced GTLM with a 1:43.490 lap, 0.053 seconds quicker than Werner's No. 911 Porsche. GTD was led by Paul Miller's Audi of Calderelli with a late 1:47.455 lap, 0.056 seconds faster than Bleekemolen's Riley Mercedes-AMG; Kaz Grala's Change Lamborghini was third. The session had two stoppages. The first was at 13 minutes, when the Risi Ferrari leaked oil on the track. Emmanuel Anassis' DAC Lamborghini caused the second stoppage with a left-rear tire failure caused by low air pressure, destroying the car against the turn-one barrier; the car was moved to the pit lane on a flatbed truck. IMSA allowed DAC to switch to a 2016 O'Gara Motorsports display Lamborghini.

=== Qualifying results ===
Provisional pole positions in each class are denoted in bold. All Prototype and Prototype Challenge cars were grouped together on the starting grid, regardless of qualifying position.

Final qualifying classification
Pos.	Class	No.	Team	Driver	Time	Grid
1	**P**	**5**	**Mustang Sampling Racing**	**João Barbosa**	**1:36.903**	1
2	P	31	Whelen Engineering Racing	Dane Cameron	1:36.973	2
3	P	13	Rebellion Racing	Neel Jani	1:37.123	3
4	P	10	Wayne Taylor Racing	Ricky Taylor	1:37.169	4
5	P	22	Tequila Patrón ESM	Brendon Hartley	1:37.609	5
6	P	2	Tequila Patrón ESM	Ryan Dalziel	1:38.251	6
7	P	85	JDC-Miller MotorSports	Stephen Simpson	1:38.915	7
8	P	52	PR1/Mathiasen Motorsports	Tom Kimber-Smith	1:39.149	8
9	P	55	Mazda Motorsports	Jonathan Bomarito	1:39.940	9
10	P	70	Mazda Motorsports	Joel Miller	1:39.973	10
11	P	90	VisitFlorida Racing	Marc Goossens	1:40.532	11
12	**PC**	**38**	**Performance Tech Motorsports**	**James French**	**1:42.559**	12
13	PC	26	BAR1 Motorsports	Johnny Mowlem	1:43.396	13
14	**GTLM**	**66**	**Ford Chip Ganassi Racing**	**Joey Hand**	**1:43.473**	18
15	PC	20	BAR1 Motorsports	Buddy Rice	1:43.515	14
16	GTLM	67	Ford Chip Ganassi Racing	Richard Westbrook	1:43.704	19
17	GTLM	68	Ford Chip Ganassi Team UK	Olivier Pla	1:43.987	20
18	GTLM	62	Risi Competizione	Toni Vilander	1:44.121	21
19	GTLM	911	Porsche GT Team	Patrick Pilet	1:44.251	22
20	GTLM	69	Ford Chip Ganassi Team UK	Andy Priaulx	1:44.256	23
21	GTLM	3	Corvette Racing	Jan Magnussen	1:44.359	24
22	GTLM	912	Porsche GT Team	Kévin Estre	1:44.591	25
23	GTLM	4	Corvette Racing	Oliver Gavin	1:44.685	26
24	GTLM	19	BMW Team RLL	Bill Auberlen	1:44.759	27
25	GTLM	24	BMW Team RLL	John Edwards	1:44.974	28
26	PC	8	Starworks Motorsport	Chris Cumming	1:46.628	15
27	**GTD**	**51**	**Spirit of Race**	**Alessandro Pier Guidi**	**1:47.099**	29
28	GTD	63	Scuderia Corsa	Alessandro Balzan	1:47.117	30
29	PC	88	Starworks Motorsport	Alex Popow	1:47.682	16
30	GTD	98	Aston Martin Racing	Marco Sørensen	1:47.734	31
31	GTD	59	Manthey Racing	Matteo Cairoli	1:47.736	32
32	GTD	11	GRT Grasser Racing Team	Mirko Bortolotti	1:47.785	33
33	GTD	29	Montaplast by Land-Motorsport	Connor De Phillippi	1:48.213	34
34	GTD	93	Michael Shank Racing with Curb-Agajanian	Andy Lally	1:48.268	35
35	GTD	28	Alegra Motorsports	Daniel Morad	1:48.341	36
36	GTD	86	Michael Shank Racing with Curb-Agajanian	Jeff Segal	1:48.350	37
37	GTD	73	Park Place Motorsports	Patrick Lindsey	1:48.424	38
38	GTD	61	GRT Grasser Racing Team	Christian Engelhart	1:48.483	39
39	GTD	48	Paul Miller Racing	Bryan Sellers	1:48.496	40
40	GTD	14	3GT Racing	Scott Pruett	1:48.541	41
41	GTD	16	Change Racing	Jeroen Mul	1:48.590	42
42	GTD	57	Stevenson Motorsports	Andrew Davis	1:48.683	43
43	GTD	23	Alex Job Racing	Pierre Kaffer	1:48.798	44
44	GTD	96	Turner Motorsport	Justin Marks	1:48.810	45
45	GTD	75	SunEnergy1 Racing	Boris Said	1:48.969	46
46	GTD	33	Riley Motorsports – Team AMG	Ben Keating	1:49.056	47
47	GTD	15	3GT Racing	Austin Cindric	1:49.130	48
48	GTD	21	Konrad Motorsport	Marco Mapelli	1:49.322	49
49	GTD	991	TRG	Mike Hedlund	1:49.446	50
50	GTD	46	EBIMOTORS	Emanuele Busnelli	1:49.781	51
51	GTD	50	Riley Motorsports – WeatherTech Racing	Cooper MacNeil	1:49.809	52
52	GTD	54	CORE Autosport	Jon Bennett	1:50.809	53
53	GTD	18	DAC Motorsports	Emmanuel Anassis	1:51.517	54
54	GTD	27	Dream Racing Motorsport	Lawrence DeGeorge	1:55.835	55
–	P	81	DragonSpeed	did not participate		17

== Race ==
=== Start and early hours ===
The weather at the start of the race was cool and cloudy, with a temperature of 55 °F (13 °C). Dario Franchitti, triple Indianapolis 500 and 2008 24 Hours of Daytona champion, ordered the drivers to start their engines. Honorary starter Hurley Haywood waved the green flag at 2:30 pm on January 28 to start the race, led by Barbosa in pole position. All 55 cars started, and Barbosa maintained the lead for AXR with Johnny Mowlem taking the PC lead from Performance Tech's entry. The first full-course caution came on lap five, when Mul crashed the Change Lamborghini into the left-side tire barrier at turn five (the West Horseshoe) after going onto the right-side grass (sustaining left-front damage); safety crews were needed to extricate the car from the wall. When racing resumed eight minutes later, Cameron overtook his teammate Barbosa on the inside at the Bus Stop chicane after 16 laps. Ricky Taylor's fast pace moved WTR from fourth to second by the end of the first hour, as French retook the PC lead from Mowlem.

Taylor's pace for WTR promoted him to the overall lead when he overtook Barbosa's AXR Cadillac during the second hour, and Lindsey passed Christina Nielsen's No. 63 Risi Ferrari to lead GTD. Scott Pruett lost control of 3GT's No. 14 Lexus leaving turn one, went across the road in front of Tommy Milner's No. 4 Corvette, and struck the left pit-lane exit barrier head-on. No other car was involved in the incident, which triggered the second caution. Pruett exited the car unaided, was transported to the infield care center, and was later released. The Lexus was retired with severe damage. Behind the safety car which led the field for 20 minutes, the Rebellion Oreca's hold on fourth place was relinquished when Jani brought the car into the garage for eleven laps to have the engine drive-by-wire throttle motor switched. After racing resumed, Tom Long tried to return to the circuit in the flow of traffic after a pit stop in the No. 70 Mazda; he and the left front of Gordon's brake-locking WTR Cadillac collided in the International Horseshoe turn. The accident lost WTR the lead to Morris's WER car, and they fell into third. Long was penalized one minute and received a stop-and-go-penalty. Jules Gounon's Land Audi took the GTD lead from Lindsey's Park Place Porsche.

After Morris's error at the first chicane and near-collision with a GTD-category Lamborghini, Eric Curran's WER car stalled in the pit lane after Curran relieved Morris, and it was moved to the garage for troubleshooting. It was demoted to third overall as Fittipaldi took the lead, with Gordon relieved by WTR's second-place Max Angelelli. A third caution was needed when John Falb's No. 8 Starworks PC Oreca car tried to lap McMurry's Park Place Porsche entering the Bus Stop chicane; the cars collided, striking the tire barrier. The Porsche was retired, and Falb entered the pit lane for repairs. McMurry was treated at the infield medical center and released. Falb was deemed responsible for the accident, assessed an eight-minute stop-and-go penalty, and was summoned to race control. Curran returned to the lead during the pit-stop cycle when teammate Fittipaldi's rear bodywork was replaced due to rear-light failure, but later lost it to Angelelli.

=== Night ===
As night fell, Mike Gausch lost control of PR1/Mathiasen's Ligier car in the International Horseshoe corner and was avoided by Curran's race-leading WER car and Angelelli's WTR Cadillac. GTD was a multi-car battle, with the lead changing several times among manufacturers over the next few hours. The Risi Ferrari had an anxious moment when it and the No. 991 TRG Porsche collided, under-braking for the Bus Stop chicane, but continued without losing the GTLM lead. James Dayson's No. 88 Starworks PC Oreca entry was being passed by Curran's WER Cadillac on the outside on the bank when they collided. Dayson crashed into the inside barrier, sustaining right-side suspension damage which hampered his return to the pit lane before he was moved by a recovery vehicle. The accident required a fourth caution for extensive cleanup; Curran, who continued driving with minor damage, led at the restart. Angelelli overtook Curran to return the WTR Cadillac to the overall lead.

Fässler's fourth-place No. 4 GTLM Corvette was hit from behind by Harry Tincknell's No. 69 Ford, and spun into the infield grass. The No. 4 Corvette had a power shutdown on the bank, causing Fässler to stop on the inside of the back straightaway leaving the second turn. A fifth caution was needed for the Corvette's recovery to the pit lane. During the caution, Conway's WER Cadillac was forced behind the pit-lane wall with a starter-motor problem which required a push start after two refueling stops. Light rain began during the sixth hour, increasing in intensity, and several teams brought their cars into the pit lane for wet-weather tires. When racing resumed, WTR's Jordan Taylor drove on dry tires which lost temperature (and pressure) during the caution. Taylor relinquished the lead to Filipe Albuquerque's Mustang Sampling car after a pit stop for wet-weather tires. In the seventh hour, Cooper MacNeil's No. 50 Riley Mercedes ceded the GTD lead when a flat tire damaged its right front-wheel suspension components and it was sent to the garage to check for further damage.

A sixth, over-20-minute caution was needed when Kyle Masson lost control of the PC-class leading Performance Tech car at the International Horseshoe turn in front of Conway, who avoided him. Masson restarted his vehicle without trouble, leaving no debris and keeping the PC lead. GTLM was another multi-car battle, with representatives of each of the five manufacturers close together on the same lap. Vilander's Risi Ferrari became the new GTLM leader, ahead of Sébastien Bourdais' No. 66 Ford, after pit stops. Conway lost the WER Cadillac's second place overall to Jordan Taylor's WTR entry when he ran wide at the first turn. The WER vehicle was later forced into the garage for six laps to repair steering wheel and suspension damage from its fifth-hour accident with Dayson by replacing the right front toe link. ESM's No. 22 Nissan of Hartley and (later) Bruno Senna took the lead when Ricky Taylor's WTR Cadillac slowed and Mustang Sampling repaired a faulty rear brake light by replacing the car's rear end.

Land's Audi of Connor De Phillippi ceded the GTD lead to Core's No. 54 Porsche of Colin Braun when a flat right rear tire, due to accumulated debris, forced it to make a pit stop. Brett Sandberg's Change Lamborghini then struck the Bus Stop chicane exit barrier, causing the seventh caution. After the 20-minute caution, Kanaan lapped quickly in the wet conditions and moved the No. 69 Ford from seventh to second in GTLM. 3GT's sole remaining Lexus of Dominik Farnbacher bowed out of the battle for the GTD lead when it made an unscheduled pit stop for a replacement door after a right rear tire failure on the bank destroyed the car's right rear. An eighth caution was needed when Hartley, in the second-place No. 22 ESM Nissan, failed to generate tire temperature on the wet track and ran onto the grass at both hairpins. He hit the side of Wolf Henzler's No. 991 Porsche leaving turn six, spinning him sideways into the outside barrier on the bank. Hartley could not steer due to damage and stopped on the entrance to the Bus Stop chicane for recovery to the pit lane on a flatbed truck. This moved Barbosa's Mustang Sampling Cadillac up to second overall, a lap behind WTR's Ricky Taylor.

When racing resumed, Mies moved the Land Audi past the No. 93 MSR Acura of Andy Lally for the GTD class lead. Briscoe's No. 67 Ford sustained rear-wing damage against the barrier at the exit of the Bus Stop chicane after he lost control and went to the garage for repairs. At half distance, Angelelli's WTR Cadillac led overall ahead of VisitFlorida's entry of Rast; Performance Tech led in PC. Estre took the GTLM lead halfway through the 11th hour in Porsche's No. 912 RSR from his teammate Pilet's No. 911 car to counter Ford's strategy switch; MSR's Acura of Jeff Segal led in GTD, with De Phillipi lapping about three seconds faster in Land's second-place Audi. The ninth caution was issued when Niclas Jönsson was apparently hit from behind by an Audi on the entry to the Bus Stop chicane, and his car's left corner was damaged by the barrier. The car was retired due to damage after a garage inspection. Jönsson was unhurt; he was checked at the medical center and released.

After racing resumed, Angelelli received a drive-through penalty after his refueler inserted the fueling nozzle before the fire extinguisher was moved over the pit-lane wall; this dropped the WTR car to second and promoted Rast's VisitFlorida car to the lead. Increasing rainfall prompted officials to issue a 10th, 54-minute caution. Shortly after racing resumed, MacNeil lost control of Riley's No. 50 Mercedes exiting the second corner, damaging its left front suspension against the inside barrier and prompting the 11th caution. The Mercedes was retired due to heavy damage. Just before a 12th caution caused by Trent Hindman's No. 26 BAR Oreca PC-class car stopping in the Bus Stop chicane, WTR's Angelelli retook the lead from Rast's VisitFlorida entry, and Porsche's speed in the rain moved Werner's No. 911 car to the GTLM lead. WER's Curran's dropped out of contention for victory when he entered the garage for shifter repairs.

=== Morning to afternoon ===
In the early morning a 13th caution was deployed for one hour and 42 minutes due to heavy rain just before the Risi Ferrari of James Calado overtook Werner's No. 911 Porsche to lead in GTLM. The long caution meant that the Audi R8 safety car was running low on fuel and had to be replaced by a Porsche Cayenne until the Audi was refueled; teams were notified by race control that there would be no race stoppage due to the caution, but standing water made racing unsafe. French had an anxious moment when he lost control of the PC-leading Performance Tech car at the International Horseshoe turn, but he recovered without losing the category lead. Marc Goossens' VisitFlorida entry took the lead during the caution when Ricky Taylor made a troubled pit stop in WTR's Cadillac, which refused to start; (Note: The WTR Cadillac's bag tank had partially collapsed; this made fuel stops problematic, losing it a small amount of time at each.) Goossens lost the lead to Albuquerque's Mustang Sampling car at the restart. Ricky Taylor passed Albuquerque for the lead before VisitFlorida's car of Renger van der Zande was issued a drive-through penalty for repeatedly shortcutting the Bus Stop chicane after IMSA race director Beaux Barfield told teams that it was unacceptable.

David Cheng's damaged No. 26 BAR1 Oreca PC car lost its front bodywork exiting the Western Horseshoe turn, prompting the 14th caution as Buddy Rice's No. 20 BAR1 entry entered the garage for rear body repairs. Bourdais returned the No. 66 Ford GT to the GTLM lead, and WTR regained the lead it lost to Barbosa when Angelelli passed the Mustang Sampling Cadillac. Sharp's fourth-placed No. 2 ESM Nissan crashed into an infield advertising hoarding which was on the track. A 15th caution was issued when Jack Hawksworth crashed the No. 15 3GT Lexus into the outside tire barrier at turn six and continued driving. Vilander moved the Risi Ferrari past Hand's No. 66 Ford and Antonio García's No. 3 Corvette for the GTLM lead before he was closed in on when the track dried. Several teams began to install dry tires on their cars in the pit lane when a dry line began to emerge on the track, making them faster than the wet surface did. Angelelli had an anxious moment when he struck a damp curb and lost control of WTR's Cadillac entering the Bus Stop chicane, but he retained his lead over Barbosa.

In the 21st hour, Chris Cumming caused the 16th caution when he spun the No. 8 Starworks PC car into the inside barrier leaving the first corner and retired. A 17th caution was issued when Trent Hindman spun the No. 26 BAR1 car on cold tires during his out-lap entering the first turn. He crashed into the tire wall and continued by reversing. Hanley's DragonSpeed Oreca lost most of its rear bodywork in the Bus Stop chicane, triggering the 18th caution. Bird moved Scuderia Corsa's Ferrari to the GTD lead before its engine failed at the inside exit of turn six, prompting a 19th caution. The Ferrari's retirement gave Gounon's Land Audi the class lead. Michael Christensen's No. 28 Alegra Porsche joined the battle in GTD, led by Riley's No. 33 Mercedes of Bleekemolen from Lally's No. 93 MSR Acura. Ricky Taylor's WTR and Mustang Sampling's Albuquerque dueled for the overall lead, and Hand moved the No. 66 Ford back to first in GTLM.

A 20th caution was triggered after the radiator duct on Lally's No. 93 MSR Acura detached from the hood and landed on the circuit, overheating the gearbox and forcing it into the pit lane. Ricky Taylor and Albuquerque continued to battle for the win when racing resumed, and García's No. 3 Corvette took the lead in GTLM after a pit-stop cycle before losing out to Müller's No. 66 Ford and Calado's Risi Ferrari. Riley's No. 33 Mercedes led the GTD before it was passed by De Phillipi's Land Audi and Christensen's Alegra Porsche due to poor grip. The 21st (and final) caution was needed when Lally stopped the No. 93 MSR Acura on the infield grass near the entrance of turn five due to a loss of power and needed recovering. When racing continued, Ricky Taylor was second and unsuccessfully tried to pass Albuquerque on the outside at the first infield hairpin. He tried again while braking into turn one; the WTR Cadillac's right front hit the Mustang Sampling car's left rear, moving Taylor to the lead and making Albuquerque spin. Race control investigated the collision but took no action against Taylor.

=== Finish ===
Taylor maintained the lead under pressure from Albuquerque for WTR's second Daytona win by 0.671 seconds after 659 laps. The VisitFlorida Riley car, slower in dry weather than in wet conditions, was the highest-placed LMP2 entry in third. The battle in GTLM continued until the final hour, as Müller's No. 66 Ford gave CGR victory by 2.988 seconds over Pilet's No. 911 Porsche; Pilet failed repeatedly to overtake Müller into the first turn and overstressed his Porsche's tires. The Risi Ferrari completed the GTLM podium in third, with Calado 0.091 seconds behind Pilet as the latter slowed on the last lap. The final 514 laps of the last PC race at Daytona were led by Performance Tech's Oreca FLM09, which finished 22 laps over the second-place No. 2 BAR1 team in its first IMSA victory and class win since the 2013 Baltimore Sports Car Challenge. The GTD duel lasted until the final hour, when Christensen's strategy to stop for fuel in the final hour and conserve it during the last caution sent him past Mies' Land Audi for Alegras' first Daytona class win since 2007 by 0.293 seconds. Bleekemolen's No. 50 Riley Motorsport's car was third in GTD in Mercedes's maiden IMSA event.

== After the race ==
Albuquerque expressed his displeasure with the late-race collision with Ricky Taylor which cost AXR the overall victory: "If he's a true racer who did a mistake, just back off. Wait, don't leave. And he left! A true racer, in my opinion, in the end, deep inside, I'd feel a little bit ashamed of the win." Ricky Taylor defended WTR's race-winning pass, saying he had been preparing the overtake for some time and believed that Albuquerque had seen him approach. Rast admitted to being surprised to finish on the podium, given VisitFlorida's lack of preparation for the event as they expected to enter the garage in the first hour since they were unsure as to how reliable their car was: "We were counting the laps, because our longest run before was maybe 10 or 11 laps. We never did 20 [laps] or 1 hour in a row, so we didn't know what to expect, but the car was just running and running without any big issues."

Bourdais and Hand paid tribute to their teammate, Müller, for passing García's Corvette and Calado's Ferrari and fending off Pilet's Porsche to secure the No. 66 Ford team victory in GTLM. Müller described the race's final two hours as "nerve-racking" given Ferrari and Porsche's sudden increase in pace on the straights in the final stages: "I just had to stick to my line and cover myself. I really enjoyed racing again Patrick [Pilet] and James Calado. I think that was one of the best GT races you could have seen, that you coulda dreamed of." Alegra team owner and racer Carlos de Quesada said that he was proud to give young drivers the opportunity to showcase their abilities at Daytona, having helped them to develop through kart racing and hoping they would progress to the next level with his help.

Christensen said it was quite difficult to stay on the track and that his team's plan was to remain on the lead lap and to "have a perfect race car for the end of the race." Gounon said that the reason Land Motorsports did not win in GTD was because IMSA installed a smaller fuel restrictor on their Audi, which lengthened their pit stops. Performance Tech team principal Brent O'Neill called his team's PC class win "really special": "There were a lot of people after the Roar that didn't think that our car was going to be winning any races any time soon, but here we are. This was good for the whole team. It was a great morale booster as we head into the rest of the season." Atherton said that three of the four categories seeing race-long battles demonstrated the effectiveness of IMSA's Technical Committee getting their calculations correct when establishing regulations and restrictions: "While we recognize it will always be a topic of great debate, we believe it was extremely fair and equitable for all involved."

This was the season's first round, and Angelelli, Gordon and the Taylor brothers led the Prototype Drivers' Championship with 35 points, ahead of Albuquerue, Barbosa and Fittipaldi by three points. Nicholas Boulle, French, Masson and O'Ward led the PC points standings, ahead of Cheng, Hindman, Adam Merzon, Mowlem and Tom Papadopoulos. Bourdais, Hand and Müller held the GTLM Drivers' Championship lead over Frédéric Makowiecki, Pilet and Werner. In GTD, Christensen, Carlos de Quesada, Michael de Quesada, Jesse Lazare and Daniel Morad led the class points standings over De Phillipi, Gounon, Mies and Jeffrey Schmidt. WTR, Performance Tech, CGR and Alegra led their respective Teams' Championships, and Cadillac, Ford and Porsche led their respective Manufacturers' Championships with 11 rounds remaining in the season.

=== Results ===
Class winners are denoted in bold. P stands for Prototype, PC (Prototype Challenge), GTLM (Grand Touring Le Mans) and GTD (Grand Touring Daytona).

Final race classification
Pos	Class	No.	Team	Drivers	Chassis	Tire	Laps	Time/Retired
Pos	Class	No.	Team	Drivers	Engine	Tire	Laps	Time/Retired
1	**P**	**10**	**(United States) Wayne Taylor Racing**	**(United States) Ricky Taylor (United States) Jordan Taylor (Italy) Max Angelelli (United States) Jeff Gordon**	**Cadillac DPi-V.R**	C	**659**	**24:00:57.343**
1	**P**	**10**	**(United States) Wayne Taylor Racing**	**(United States) Ricky Taylor (United States) Jordan Taylor (Italy) Max Angelelli (United States) Jeff Gordon**	Cadillac 6.2 L V8	C	**659**	**24:00:57.343**
2	P	5	(United States) Mustang Sampling Racing	(Portugal) João Barbosa (Brazil) Christian Fittipaldi (Portugal) Filipe Albuquerque	Cadillac DPi-V.R	C	659	+0.671
2	P	5	(United States) Mustang Sampling Racing	(Portugal) João Barbosa (Brazil) Christian Fittipaldi (Portugal) Filipe Albuquerque	Cadillac 6.2 L V8	C	659	+0.671
3	P	90	(United States) VisitFlorida Racing	(Belgium) Marc Goossens (Netherlands) Renger van der Zande (Germany) René Rast	Riley Mk. 30	C	658	+1 Lap
3	P	90	(United States) VisitFlorida Racing	(Belgium) Marc Goossens (Netherlands) Renger van der Zande (Germany) René Rast	Gibson GK428 4.2 L V8	C	658	+1 Lap
4	P	2	(United States) Tequila Patrón ESM	(United States) Scott Sharp (United Kingdom) Ryan Dalziel (Brazil) Pipo Derani (New Zealand) Brendon Hartley	Nissan Onroak DPi	C	656	+3 Laps
4	P	2	(United States) Tequila Patrón ESM	(United States) Scott Sharp (United Kingdom) Ryan Dalziel (Brazil) Pipo Derani (New Zealand) Brendon Hartley	Nissan 3.8 L Turbo V6	C	656	+3 Laps
5	**GTLM**	**66**	**(United States) Ford Chip Ganassi Racing**	**(Germany) Dirk Müller (United States) Joey Hand (France) Sébastien Bourdais**	**Ford GT**	M	**652**	**+7 Laps**
5	**GTLM**	**66**	**(United States) Ford Chip Ganassi Racing**	**(Germany) Dirk Müller (United States) Joey Hand (France) Sébastien Bourdais**	Ford EcoBoost 3.5 L Turbo V6	M	**652**	**+7 Laps**
6	GTLM	911	(United States) Porsche GT Team	(France) Patrick Pilet (Germany) Dirk Werner (France) Frédéric Makowiecki	Porsche 911 RSR	M	652	+7 Laps
6	GTLM	911	(United States) Porsche GT Team	(France) Patrick Pilet (Germany) Dirk Werner (France) Frédéric Makowiecki	Porsche 4.0 L Flat-6	M	652	+7 Laps
7	GTLM	62	(United States) Risi Competizione	(Italy) Giancarlo Fisichella (United Kingdom) James Calado (Finland) Toni Vilander	Ferrari 488 GTE	M	652	+7 Laps
7	GTLM	62	(United States) Risi Competizione	(Italy) Giancarlo Fisichella (United Kingdom) James Calado (Finland) Toni Vilander	Ferrari F154CB 3.9 L Turbo V8	M	652	+7 Laps
8	GTLM	3	(United States) Corvette Racing	(Spain) Antonio García (Denmark) Jan Magnussen (Germany) Mike Rockenfeller	Chevrolet Corvette C7.R	M	652	+7 Laps
8	GTLM	3	(United States) Corvette Racing	(Spain) Antonio García (Denmark) Jan Magnussen (Germany) Mike Rockenfeller	Chevrolet LT5.5 5.5 L V8	M	652	+7 Laps
9	GTLM	69	(United States) Ford Chip Ganassi Team UK	(United Kingdom) Harry Tincknell (United Kingdom) Andy Priaulx (Brazil) Tony Kanaan	Ford GT	M	652	+7 Laps
9	GTLM	69	(United States) Ford Chip Ganassi Team UK	(United Kingdom) Harry Tincknell (United Kingdom) Andy Priaulx (Brazil) Tony Kanaan	Ford EcoBoost 3.5 L Turbo V6	M	652	+7 Laps
10	GTLM	912	(United States) Porsche GT Team	(France) Kévin Estre (Belgium) Laurens Vanthoor (Austria) Richard Lietz	Porsche 911 RSR	M	652	+7 Laps
10	GTLM	912	(United States) Porsche GT Team	(France) Kévin Estre (Belgium) Laurens Vanthoor (Austria) Richard Lietz	Porsche 4.0 L Flat-6	M	652	+7 Laps
11	GTLM	68	(United States) Ford Chip Ganassi Team UK	(Germany) Stefan Mücke (France) Olivier Pla (United States) Billy Johnson	Ford GT	M	652	+7 Laps
11	GTLM	68	(United States) Ford Chip Ganassi Team UK	(Germany) Stefan Mücke (France) Olivier Pla (United States) Billy Johnson	Ford EcoBoost 3.5 L Turbo V6	M	652	+7 Laps
12	GTLM	19	(United States) BMW Team RLL	(United States) Bill Auberlen (United Kingdom) Alexander Sims (Brazil) Augusto Farfus (Canada) Bruno Spengler	BMW M6 GTLM	M	651	+8 Laps
12	GTLM	19	(United States) BMW Team RLL	(United States) Bill Auberlen (United Kingdom) Alexander Sims (Brazil) Augusto Farfus (Canada) Bruno Spengler	BMW 4.4 L Turbo V8	M	651	+8 Laps
13	P	85	(United States) JDC-Miller MotorSports	(United States) Chris Miller (South Africa) Stephen Simpson (Canada) Misha Goikhberg (Switzerland) Mathias Beche	Oreca 07	C	646	+13 Laps
13	P	85	(United States) JDC-Miller MotorSports	(United States) Chris Miller (South Africa) Stephen Simpson (Canada) Misha Goikhberg (Switzerland) Mathias Beche	Gibson GK428 4.2 L V8	C	646	+13 Laps
14	P	31	(United States) Whelen Engineering Racing	(United States) Dane Cameron (United States) Eric Curran (United Kingdom) Mike Conway (United Kingdom) Seb Morris	Cadillac DPi-V.R	C	639	+20 Laps
14	P	31	(United States) Whelen Engineering Racing	(United States) Dane Cameron (United States) Eric Curran (United Kingdom) Mike Conway (United Kingdom) Seb Morris	Cadillac 6.2 L V8	C	639	+20 Laps
15	**PC**	**38**	**(United States) Performance Tech Motorsports**	**(United States) James French (Mexico) Pato O'Ward (United States) Kyle Masson (United States) Nicholas Boulle**	**Oreca FLM09**	C	**638**	**+21 Laps**
15	**PC**	**38**	**(United States) Performance Tech Motorsports**	**(United States) James French (Mexico) Pato O'Ward (United States) Kyle Masson (United States) Nicholas Boulle**	Chevrolet 6.2 L V8	C	**638**	**+21 Laps**
16	GTLM	4	(United States) Corvette Racing	(United Kingdom) Oliver Gavin (United States) Tommy Milner (Switzerland) Marcel Fässler	Chevrolet Corvette C7.R	M	636	+23 Laps
16	GTLM	4	(United States) Corvette Racing	(United Kingdom) Oliver Gavin (United States) Tommy Milner (Switzerland) Marcel Fässler	Chevrolet LT5.5 5.5 L V8	M	636	+23 Laps
17	P	22	(United States) Tequila Patrón ESM	(United States) Ed Brown (United States) Johannes van Overbeek (Brazil) Bruno Senna (New Zealand) Brendon Hartley	Nissan Onroak DPi	C	636	+23 Laps
17	P	22	(United States) Tequila Patrón ESM	(United States) Ed Brown (United States) Johannes van Overbeek (Brazil) Bruno Senna (New Zealand) Brendon Hartley	Nissan 3.8 L Turbo V6	C	636	+23 Laps
18	**GTD**	**28**	**(United States) Alegra Motorsports**	**(United States) Carlos de Quesada (United States) Michael de Quesada (Canada) Daniel Morad (Canada) Jesse Lazare (Denmark) Michael Christensen**	**Porsche 911 GT3 R**	C	**634**	**+25 Laps**
18	**GTD**	**28**	**(United States) Alegra Motorsports**	**(United States) Carlos de Quesada (United States) Michael de Quesada (Canada) Daniel Morad (Canada) Jesse Lazare (Denmark) Michael Christensen**	Porsche 4.0 L Flat-6	C	**634**	**+25 Laps**
19	GTD	29	(Germany) Montaplast by Land-Motorsport	(United States) Connor De Phillippi (Germany) Christopher Mies (France) Jules Gounon (Switzerland) Jeffrey Schmidt	Audi R8 LMS	C	634	+25 Laps
19	GTD	29	(Germany) Montaplast by Land-Motorsport	(United States) Connor De Phillippi (Germany) Christopher Mies (France) Jules Gounon (Switzerland) Jeffrey Schmidt	Audi 5.2 L V10	C	634	+25 Laps
20	GTD	33	(United States) Riley Motorsports – Team AMG	(United States) Ben Keating (Netherlands) Jeroen Bleekemolen (Germany) Mario Farnbacher (United Kingdom) Adam Christodoulou	Mercedes-AMG GT3	C	634	+25 Laps
20	GTD	33	(United States) Riley Motorsports – Team AMG	(United States) Ben Keating (Netherlands) Jeroen Bleekemolen (Germany) Mario Farnbacher (United Kingdom) Adam Christodoulou	Mercedes AMG M159 6.2 L V8	C	634	+25 Laps
21	GTD	57	(United States) Stevenson Motorsports	(United States) Lawson Aschenbach (United States) Andrew Davis (United States) Matt Bell (United Kingdom) Robin Liddell	Audi R8 LMS	C	634	+25 Laps
21	GTD	57	(United States) Stevenson Motorsports	(United States) Lawson Aschenbach (United States) Andrew Davis (United States) Matt Bell (United Kingdom) Robin Liddell	Audi 5.2 L V10	C	634	+25 Laps
22	GTD	86	(United States) Michael Shank Racing with Curb Agajanian	(United States) Jeff Segal (Brazil) Oswaldo Negri Jr. (United States) Tom Dyer (United States) Ryan Hunter-Reay	Acura NSX GT3	C	634	+25 Laps
22	GTD	86	(United States) Michael Shank Racing with Curb Agajanian	(United States) Jeff Segal (Brazil) Oswaldo Negri Jr. (United States) Tom Dyer (United States) Ryan Hunter-Reay	Acura 3.5 L Turbo V6	C	634	+25 Laps
23	GTD	23	(United States) Alex Job Racing	(United States) Bill Sweedler (United States) Townsend Bell (United States) Frankie Montecalvo (Germany) Pierre Kaffer	Audi R8 LMS	C	633	+26 Laps
23	GTD	23	(United States) Alex Job Racing	(United States) Bill Sweedler (United States) Townsend Bell (United States) Frankie Montecalvo (Germany) Pierre Kaffer	Audi 5.2 L V10	C	633	+26 Laps
24	GTD	48	(United States) Paul Miller Racing	(United States) Bryan Sellers (United States) Madison Snow (United States) Bryce Miller (Italy) Andrea Caldarelli (United States) Dion von Moltke	Lamborghini Huracán GT3	C	629	+30 Laps
24	GTD	48	(United States) Paul Miller Racing	(United States) Bryan Sellers (United States) Madison Snow (United States) Bryce Miller (Italy) Andrea Caldarelli (United States) Dion von Moltke	Lamborghini 5.2 L V10	C	629	+30 Laps
25	GTD	96	(United States) Turner Motorsport	(United States) Justin Marks (Germany) Jens Klingmann (Belgium) Maxime Martin (Finland) Jesse Krohn	BMW M6 GT3	C	628	+31 Laps
25	GTD	96	(United States) Turner Motorsport	(United States) Justin Marks (Germany) Jens Klingmann (Belgium) Maxime Martin (Finland) Jesse Krohn	BMW 4.4 L Turbo V8	C	628	+31 Laps
26	GTD	46	(Italy) EBIMOTORS	(Italy) Emanuele Busnelli (Italy) Fabio Babini (France) Emmanuel Collard (France) François Perrodo	Lamborghini Huracán GT3	C	626	+33 Laps
26	GTD	46	(Italy) EBIMOTORS	(Italy) Emanuele Busnelli (Italy) Fabio Babini (France) Emmanuel Collard (France) François Perrodo	Lamborghini 5.2 L V10	C	626	+33 Laps
27	GTLM	67	(United States) Ford Chip Ganassi Racing	(Australia) Ryan Briscoe (United Kingdom) Richard Westbrook (New Zealand) Scott Dixon	Ford GT	M	624	+35 Laps
27	GTLM	67	(United States) Ford Chip Ganassi Racing	(Australia) Ryan Briscoe (United Kingdom) Richard Westbrook (New Zealand) Scott Dixon	Ford EcoBoost 3.5 L Turbo V6	M	624	+35 Laps
28	GTD	991	(United States) TRG	(Mexico) Santiago Creel (United States) Mike Hedlund (Germany) Wolf Henzler (Belgium) Jan Heylen (United States) Tim Pappas	Porsche 911 GT3 R	C	621	+38 Laps
28	GTD	991	(United States) TRG	(Mexico) Santiago Creel (United States) Mike Hedlund (Germany) Wolf Henzler (Belgium) Jan Heylen (United States) Tim Pappas	Porsche 4.0 L Flat-6	C	621	+38 Laps
29	GTD	93	(United States) Michael Shank Racing with Curb Agajanian	(United States) Andy Lally (United Kingdom) Katherine Legge (Canada) Mark Wilkins (United States) Graham Rahal	Acura NSX GT3	C	617	+42 Laps
29	GTD	93	(United States) Michael Shank Racing with Curb Agajanian	(United States) Andy Lally (United Kingdom) Katherine Legge (Canada) Mark Wilkins (United States) Graham Rahal	Acura 3.5 L Turbo V6	C	617	+42 Laps
30	PC	26	(United States) BAR1 Motorsports	(United States) Tom Papadopoulos (United Kingdom) Johnny Mowlem (United States) Adam Merzon (United States) Trent Hindman (United States) David Cheng	Oreca FLM09	C	616	+43 Laps
30	PC	26	(United States) BAR1 Motorsports	(United States) Tom Papadopoulos (United Kingdom) Johnny Mowlem (United States) Adam Merzon (United States) Trent Hindman (United States) David Cheng	Chevrolet 6.2 L V8	C	616	+43 Laps
31	P	13	(Switzerland) Rebellion Racing	(Switzerland) Sébastien Buemi (Germany) Nick Heidfeld (Switzerland) Neel Jani (France) Stéphane Sarrazin	Oreca 07	C	609	+50 Laps
31	P	13	(Switzerland) Rebellion Racing	(Switzerland) Sébastien Buemi (Germany) Nick Heidfeld (Switzerland) Neel Jani (France) Stéphane Sarrazin	Gibson GK428 4.2 L V8	C	609	+50 Laps
32	PC	20	(United States) BAR1 Motorsports	(United States) Don Yount (United States) Buddy Rice (United States) Mark Kvamme (United States) Chapman Ducote (Colombia) Gustavo Yacamán	Oreca FLM09	C	599	+60 Laps
32	PC	20	(United States) BAR1 Motorsports	(United States) Don Yount (United States) Buddy Rice (United States) Mark Kvamme (United States) Chapman Ducote (Colombia) Gustavo Yacamán	Chevrolet 6.2 L V8	C	599	+60 Laps
33	GTD	98	(United Kingdom) Aston Martin Racing	(Canada) Paul Dalla Lana (Portugal) Pedro Lamy (Austria) Mathias Lauda (Denmark) Marco Sørensen	Aston Martin Vantage GT3	C	593	+66 Laps
33	GTD	98	(United Kingdom) Aston Martin Racing	(Canada) Paul Dalla Lana (Portugal) Pedro Lamy (Austria) Mathias Lauda (Denmark) Marco Sørensen	Aston Martin 6.0 L V12	C	593	+66 Laps
34	GTD	18	(Canada) DAC Motorsports	(Canada) Emmanuel Anassis (United States) Brandon Gdovic (Canada) Zachary Claman DeMelo (United States) Anthony Massari	Lamborghini Huracán GT3	C	590	+69 Laps
34	GTD	18	(Canada) DAC Motorsports	(Canada) Emmanuel Anassis (United States) Brandon Gdovic (Canada) Zachary Claman DeMelo (United States) Anthony Massari	Lamborghini 5.2 L V10	C	590	+69 Laps
35	P	52	(United States) PR1/Mathiasen Motorsports	(United States) Mike Guasch (Mexico) José Gutiérrez (United States) RC Enerson (United Kingdom) Tom Kimber-Smith	Ligier JS P217	C	584	+75 Laps
35	P	52	(United States) PR1/Mathiasen Motorsports	(United States) Mike Guasch (Mexico) José Gutiérrez (United States) RC Enerson (United Kingdom) Tom Kimber-Smith	Gibson GK428 4.2 L V8	C	584	+75 Laps
36	GTD	15	(United States) 3GT Racing	(United Kingdom) Jack Hawksworth (United States) Robert Alon (United States) Austin Cindric (Germany) Dominik Farnbacher	Lexus RC F GT3	C	581	+78 Laps
36	GTD	15	(United States) 3GT Racing	(United Kingdom) Jack Hawksworth (United States) Robert Alon (United States) Austin Cindric (Germany) Dominik Farnbacher	Lexus 5.0 L V8	C	581	+78 Laps
37	GTD	11	(Austria) GRT Grasser Racing Team	(Germany) Christian Engelhart (Switzerland) Rolf Ineichen (Argentina) Ezequiel Pérez Companc (Italy) Mirko Bortolotti	Lamborghini Huracán GT3	C	580	+79 Laps
37	GTD	11	(Austria) GRT Grasser Racing Team	(Germany) Christian Engelhart (Switzerland) Rolf Ineichen (Argentina) Ezequiel Pérez Companc (Italy) Mirko Bortolotti	Lamborghini 5.2 L V10	C	580	+79 Laps
38 DNF	GTD	63	(United States) Scuderia Corsa	(Denmark) Christina Nielsen (Italy) Alessandro Balzan (Italy) Matteo Cressoni (United Kingdom) Sam Bird	Ferrari 488 GT3	C	575	Engine
38 DNF	GTD	63	(United States) Scuderia Corsa	(Denmark) Christina Nielsen (Italy) Alessandro Balzan (Italy) Matteo Cressoni (United Kingdom) Sam Bird	Ferrari F154CB 3.9 L Turbo V8	C	575	Engine
39 DNF	P	81	(United States) DragonSpeed	(Sweden) Henrik Hedman (France) Nicolas Lapierre (United Kingdom) Ben Hanley (France) Loïc Duval	Oreca 07	C	562	Crash
39 DNF	P	81	(United States) DragonSpeed	(Sweden) Henrik Hedman (France) Nicolas Lapierre (United Kingdom) Ben Hanley (France) Loïc Duval	Gibson GK428 4.2 L V8	C	562	Crash
40 DNF	P	55	(United States) Mazda Motorsports	(United States) Tristan Nunez (United States) Jonathan Bomarito (United States) Spencer Pigot	Mazda RT24-P	C	538	Fire
40 DNF	P	55	(United States) Mazda Motorsports	(United States) Tristan Nunez (United States) Jonathan Bomarito (United States) Spencer Pigot	Mazda MZ-2.0T 2.0 L Turbo I4	C	538	Fire
41	GTD	61	(Austria) GRT Grasser Racing Team	(Germany) Christian Engelhart (Switzerland) Rolf Ineichen (Italy) Roberto Pampanini (Italy) Michele Beretta (Serbia) Miloš Pavlović	Lamborghini Huracán GT3	C	526	+133 Laps
41	GTD	61	(Austria) GRT Grasser Racing Team	(Germany) Christian Engelhart (Switzerland) Rolf Ineichen (Italy) Roberto Pampanini (Italy) Michele Beretta (Serbia) Miloš Pavlović	Lamborghini 5.2 L V10	C	526	+133 Laps
42 DNF	GTD	75	(United States) SunEnergy1 Racing	(Australia) Kenny Habul (United States) Boris Said (France) Tristan Vautier (Germany) Maro Engel (Australia) Paul Morris	Mercedes-AMG GT3	C	524	Crash damage
42 DNF	GTD	75	(United States) SunEnergy1 Racing	(Australia) Kenny Habul (United States) Boris Said (France) Tristan Vautier (Germany) Maro Engel (Australia) Paul Morris	Mercedes AMG M159 6.2 L V8	C	524	Crash damage
43 DNF	GTD	27	(United States) Dream Racing Motorsport	(United States) Lawrence DeGeorge (Monaco) Cédric Sbirrazzuoli (Italy) Paolo Ruberti (Italy) Luca Persiani (Italy) Raffaele Giammaria	Lamborghini Huracán GT3	C	488	Crash damage
43 DNF	GTD	27	(United States) Dream Racing Motorsport	(United States) Lawrence DeGeorge (Monaco) Cédric Sbirrazzuoli (Italy) Paolo Ruberti (Italy) Luca Persiani (Italy) Raffaele Giammaria	Lamborghini 5.2 L V10	C	488	Crash damage
44 DNF	PC	88	(United States) Starworks Motorsport	(United States) Scott Mayer (Canada) James Dayson (Venezuela) Alex Popow (United States) Sean Rayhall (United States) Conor Daly	Oreca FLM09	C	487	Crash damage
44 DNF	PC	88	(United States) Starworks Motorsport	(United States) Scott Mayer (Canada) James Dayson (Venezuela) Alex Popow (United States) Sean Rayhall (United States) Conor Daly	Chevrolet 6.2 L V8	C	487	Crash damage
45 DNF	PC	8	(United States) Starworks Motorsport	(United States) Ben Keating (Canada) Robert Wickens (Canada) Chris Cumming (United States) John Falb (Canada) Remo Ruscitti	Oreca FLM09	C	464	Accident
45 DNF	PC	8	(United States) Starworks Motorsport	(United States) Ben Keating (Canada) Robert Wickens (Canada) Chris Cumming (United States) John Falb (Canada) Remo Ruscitti	Chevrolet 6.2 L V8	C	464	Accident
46 DNF	P	70	(United States) Mazda Motorsports	(United States) Tom Long (United States) Joel Miller (Canada) James Hinchcliffe	Mazda RT-24P	C	462	Clutch
46 DNF	P	70	(United States) Mazda Motorsports	(United States) Tom Long (United States) Joel Miller (Canada) James Hinchcliffe	Mazda MZ-2.0T 2.0 L Turbo I4	C	462	Clutch
47	GTD	21	(Austria) Konrad Motorsport	(Italy) Marco Mapelli (Germany) Marc Basseng (Germany) Luca Stolz (United States) Lance Willsey (Austria) Franz Konrad	Lamborghini Huracán GT3	C	399	+260 Laps
47	GTD	21	(Austria) Konrad Motorsport	(Italy) Marco Mapelli (Germany) Marc Basseng (Germany) Luca Stolz (United States) Lance Willsey (Austria) Franz Konrad	Lamborghini 5.2 L V10	C	399	+260 Laps
48	GTD	50	(United States) Riley Motorsports – WeatherTech Racing	(United States) Cooper MacNeil (United States) Gunnar Jeannette (New Zealand) Shane van Gisbergen (Germany) Thomas Jäger	Mercedes-AMG GT3	C	373	+286 Laps
48	GTD	50	(United States) Riley Motorsports – WeatherTech Racing	(United States) Cooper MacNeil (United States) Gunnar Jeannette (New Zealand) Shane van Gisbergen (Germany) Thomas Jäger	Mercedes AMG M159 6.2 L V8	C	373	+286 Laps
49	GTD	54	(United States) CORE Autosport	(United States) Jon Bennett (United States) Colin Braun (United States) Patrick Long (Sweden) Niclas Jönsson	Porsche 911 GT3 R	C	340	+319 Laps
49	GTD	54	(United States) CORE Autosport	(United States) Jon Bennett (United States) Colin Braun (United States) Patrick Long (Sweden) Niclas Jönsson	Porsche 4.0 L Flat-6	C	340	+319 Laps
50 DNF	GTD	51	(Switzerland) Spirit of Race	(United States) Peter Mann (Italy) Maurizio Mediani (Italy) Alessandro Pier Guidi (Italy) Davide Rigon (Italy) Rino Mastronardi	Ferrari 488 GT3	C	105	Engine
50 DNF	GTD	51	(Switzerland) Spirit of Race	(United States) Peter Mann (Italy) Maurizio Mediani (Italy) Alessandro Pier Guidi (Italy) Davide Rigon (Italy) Rino Mastronardi	Ferrari F154CB 3.9 L Turbo V8	C	105	Engine
51 DNF	GTD	73	(United States) Park Place Motorsports	(United States) Patrick Lindsey (Germany) Jörg Bergmeister (United States) Matt McMurry (Austria) Norbert Siedler	Porsche 911 GT3 R	C	102	Crash
51 DNF	GTD	73	(United States) Park Place Motorsports	(United States) Patrick Lindsey (Germany) Jörg Bergmeister (United States) Matt McMurry (Austria) Norbert Siedler	Porsche 4.0 L Flat-6	C	102	Crash
52 DNF	GTD	16	(United States) Change Racing	(United States) Corey Lewis (Netherlands) Jeroen Mul (United States) Kaz Grala (United States) Brett Sandberg	Lamborghini Huracán GT3	C	79	Crash
52 DNF	GTD	16	(United States) Change Racing	(United States) Corey Lewis (Netherlands) Jeroen Mul (United States) Kaz Grala (United States) Brett Sandberg	Lamborghini 5.2 L V10	C	79	Crash
53 DNF	GTD	59	(Germany) Manthey Racing	(Switzerland) Steve Smith (Italy) Matteo Cairoli (Germany) Reinhold Renger (Austria) Harald Proczyk (Germany) Sven Müller	Porsche 911 GT3 R	C	61	Mechanical
53 DNF	GTD	59	(Germany) Manthey Racing	(Switzerland) Steve Smith (Italy) Matteo Cairoli (Germany) Reinhold Renger (Austria) Harald Proczyk (Germany) Sven Müller	Porsche 4.0 L Flat-6	C	61	Mechanical
54 DNF	GTD	14	(United States) 3GT Racing	(United States) Scott Pruett (United States) Sage Karam (United Kingdom) Ian James (United States) Gustavo Menezes	Lexus RC F GT3	C	52	Crash
54 DNF	GTD	14	(United States) 3GT Racing	(United States) Scott Pruett (United States) Sage Karam (United Kingdom) Ian James (United States) Gustavo Menezes	Lexus 5.0 L V8	C	52	Crash
55 DNF	GTLM	24	(United States) BMW Team RLL	(United States) John Edwards (Germany) Martin Tomczyk (Netherlands) Nicky Catsburg (Canada) Kuno Wittmer	BMW M6 GTLM	M	15	Gearbox
55 DNF	GTLM	24	(United States) BMW Team RLL	(United States) John Edwards (Germany) Martin Tomczyk (Netherlands) Nicky Catsburg (Canada) Kuno Wittmer	BMW 4.4 L Turbo V8	M	15	Gearbox

Tire manufacturers
Symbol	Manufacturer
**C**	Continental
**M**	Michelin

== Post-race championship standings ==
Prototype Drivers' Championship standings
Pos.	Driver	Points
1	(Italy) Max Angelelli (United States) Jeff Gordon (United States) Jordan Taylor (United States) Ricky Taylor	35
2	(Portugal) Filipe Albuquerque (Portugal) João Barbosa (Brazil) Christian Fittipaldi	33 (−2)
3	(Belgium) Marc Goossens (Germany) René Rast (Netherlands) Renger van der Zande	30 (−5)
4	(Brazil) Pipo Derani (United Kingdom) Ryan Dalziel (United States) Scott Sharp	28 (−7)
5	(Switzerland) Mathias Beche (Canada) Misha Goikhberg (United States) Chris Miller (South Africa) Stephen Simpson	26 (−9)

PC Drivers' Championship standings
Pos.	Driver	Points
1	(United States) Nicholas Boulle (United States) James French (United States) Kyle Masson (Mexico) Patricio O'Ward	36
2	(United States) David Cheng (United States) Trent Hindman (United States) Adam Merzon (United Kingdom) Johnny Mowlem (United States) Tom Papadopoulos	32 (−4)
3	(United States) Chapman Ducote (United States) Mark Kvamme (United States) Buddy Rice (Colombia) Gustavo Yacamán (United States) Don Yount	30 (−6)
4	(United States) Conor Daly (Canada) James Dayson (United States) Scott Mayer (Venezuela) Alex Popow (United States) Sean Rayhall	28 (−8)
5	(Canada) Chris Cumming (United States) John Falb (United States) Ben Keating (Canada) Remo Ruscitti (Canada) Robert Wickens	26 (−9)

GTLM Drivers' Championship standings
Pos.	Driver	Points
1	(France) Sébastien Bourdais (United States) Joey Hand (Germany) Dirk Müller	35
2	(France) Frédéric Makowiecki (France) Patrick Pilet (Germany) Dirk Werner	32 (−3)
3	(United Kingdom) James Calado (Italy) Giancarlo Fisichella (Finland) Toni Vilander	30 (−5)
4	(Spain) Antonio García (Denmark) Jan Magnussen (Germany) Mike Rockenfeller	28 (−7)
5	(Brazil) Tony Kanaan (United Kingdom) Andy Priaulx (United Kingdom) Harry Tincknell	26 (−9)

GTD Drivers' Championship standings
Pos.	Driver	Points
1	(Denmark) Michael Christensen (United States) Carlos de Quesada (United States) Michael de Quesada (Canada) Jesse Lazare (Canada) Daniel Morad	35
2	(United States) Connor De Phillippi (France) Jules Gounon (Germany) Christopher Mies (Switzerland) Jeffrey Schmidt	32 (−3)
3	(Belgium) Jeroen Bleekemolen (United Kingdom) Adam Christodoulou (United States) Ben Keating (Germany) Mario Farnbacher	30 (−5)
4	(United States) Lawson Aschenbach (United Kingdom) Matt Bell (United States) Andrew Davis (United Kingdom) Robin Liddell	28 (−7)
5	(United States) Tom Dyer (United States) Ryan Hunter-Reay (Brazil) Oswaldo Negri Jr. (United States) Jeff Segal	26 (−9)

- Note: Only the top five positions are included for all sets of standings.

Prototype Teams' Championship standings
Pos.	Team	Points
1	(United States) No. 10 Wayne Taylor Racing	35
2	(United States) No. 5 Mustang Sampling Racing	33 (−2)
3	(United States) No. 90 VisitFlorida Racing	30 (−5)
4	(United States) No. 85 JDC-Miller MotorSports	28 (−7)
5	(United States) No. 31 Whelen Engineering Racing	26 (−9)

PC Teams' Championship standings
Pos.	Team	Points
1	(United States) No. 38 Performance Tech Motorsport	36
2	(United States) No. 26 BAR1 Motorsports	32 (−4)
3	(United States) No. 20 BAR1 Motorsports	30 (−6)
4	(United States) No. 88 Starworks Motorsport	28 (−8)
5	(United States) No. 8 Starworks Motorsport	26 (−10)

GTLM Teams' Championship standings
Pos.	Team	Points
1	(United States) No. 66 Ford Chip Ganassi Racing	35
2	(United States) Porsche GT Team	32 (−3)
3	(United States) Risi Competizione	30 (−5)
4	(United States) No. 3 Corvette Racing	28 (−7)
5	(United States) No. 69 Ford Chip Ganassi Racing UK	26 (−9)

GTD Teams' Championship standings
Pos.	Team	Points
1	(United States) No. 28 Alegra Motorsports	35
2	(Germany) No. 29 Montaplast by Land-Motorsport	32 (−3)
3	(United States) No. 33 Riley Motorsports – Team AMG	30 (−5)
4	(United States) No. 57 Stevenson Motorsports	28 (−7)
5	(United States) No. 86 Michael Shank Racing with Curb-Agajanian	26 (−9)

- Note: Only the top five positions are included for all sets of standings.

Prototype Manufacturers' Championship standings
Pos.	Manufacturer	Points
1	(United States) Cadillac	35
2	(Japan) Nissan	32 (−3)
3	(Japan) Mazda	30 (−5)

GTLM Manufacturers' Championship standings
Pos.	Manufacturer	Points
1	(United States) Ford	35
2	(Germany) Porsche	32 (−3)
3	(Italy) Ferrari	30 (−5)
4	(United States) Chevrolet	28 (−7)
5	(Germany) BMW	26 (−9)

GTD Manufacturers' Championship standings
Pos.	Manufacturer	Points
1	(Germany) Porsche	35
2	(Germany) Audi	32 (−3)
3	(Germany) Mercedes-AMG	30 (−5)
4	(United States) Acura	28 (−7)
5	(Italy) Lamborghini	26 (−9)

- Note: Only the top five positions are included for all sets of standings.

== Notes ==
WeatherTech SportsCar Championship
Previous race: Petit Le Mans (2016)	2017 season	Next race: 12 Hours of Sebring
