= Chris Miller (racing driver) =

American racing driver (born 1989)

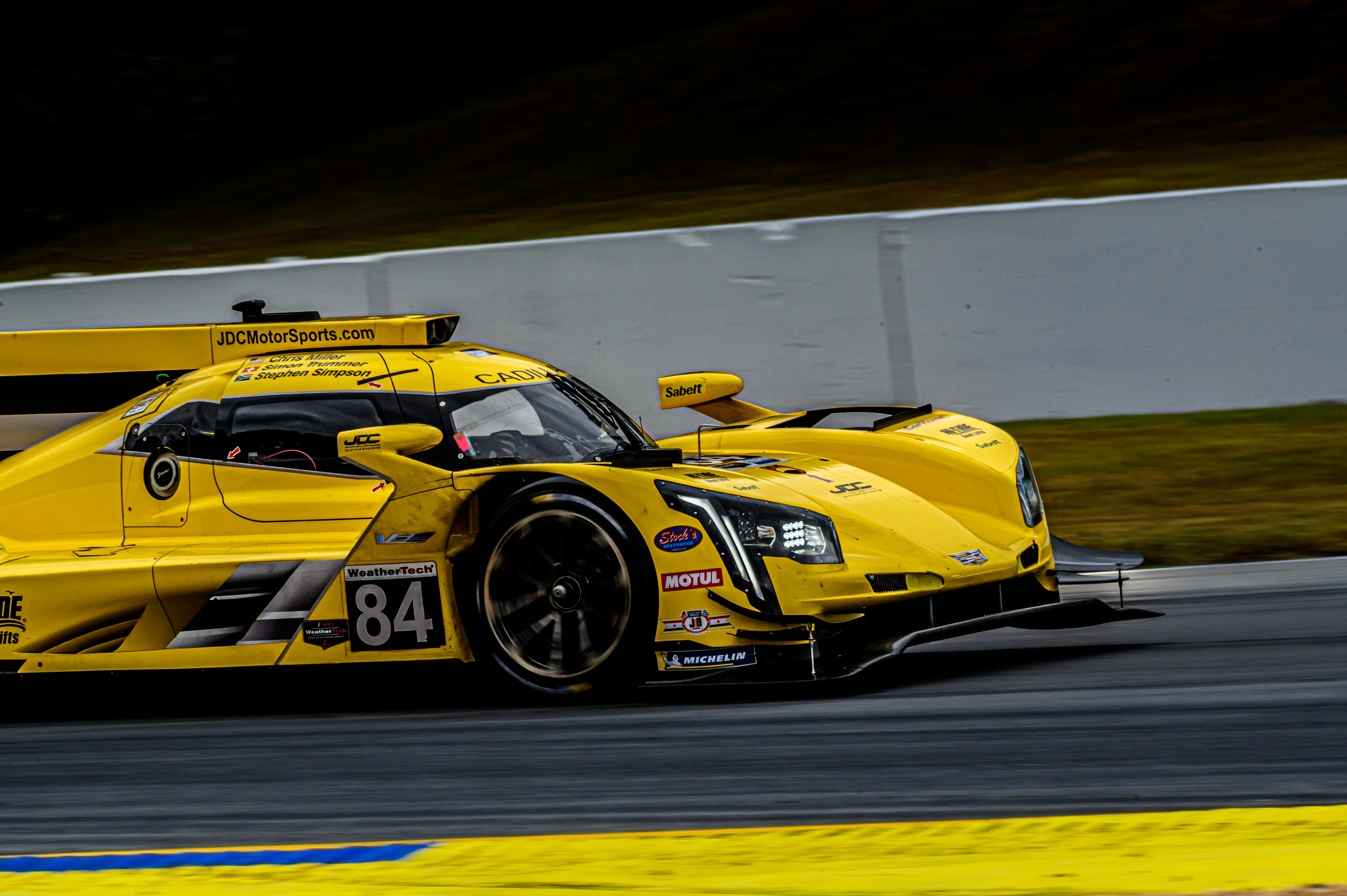
- Miller at the 2019 Petit Le Mans.
- Nationality: (United States) American
- Born: May 5, 1989 (age 37) Minneapolis, Minnesota, United States
- Categorisation: FIA Silver

Chris Miller (born May 5, 1989) is an American racing driver from Minneapolis, Minnesota. He is best known for winning in class at the 2016 24 Hours of Daytona and winning overall at the 2018 6 Hours of Watkins Glen. He currently competes in the WeatherTech SportsCar Championship with JDC-Miller MotorSports.

In 2008, Miller drove in the F2000 Championship Series for JDC MotorSports and finished fourth in points. He won the 2009 F2000 Championship Series title, winning four of the 12 races. In 2010, he moved up to the Pro Mazda championship.

In 2014, Miller and JDC-Miller MotorSports entered the Tudor United SportsCar Championship, finishing fourth in their series debut at the 12 Hours of Sebring. Miller finished seventh in the championship and claimed the team's first podium at Road America. In 2015, he finished third at the Rolex 24.

In 2016, Miller and JDC-Miller MotorSports won in class at the Rolex 24 Hours of Daytona. He also scored a podium that year at Petit Le Mans, helping the team to finish third in the championship.

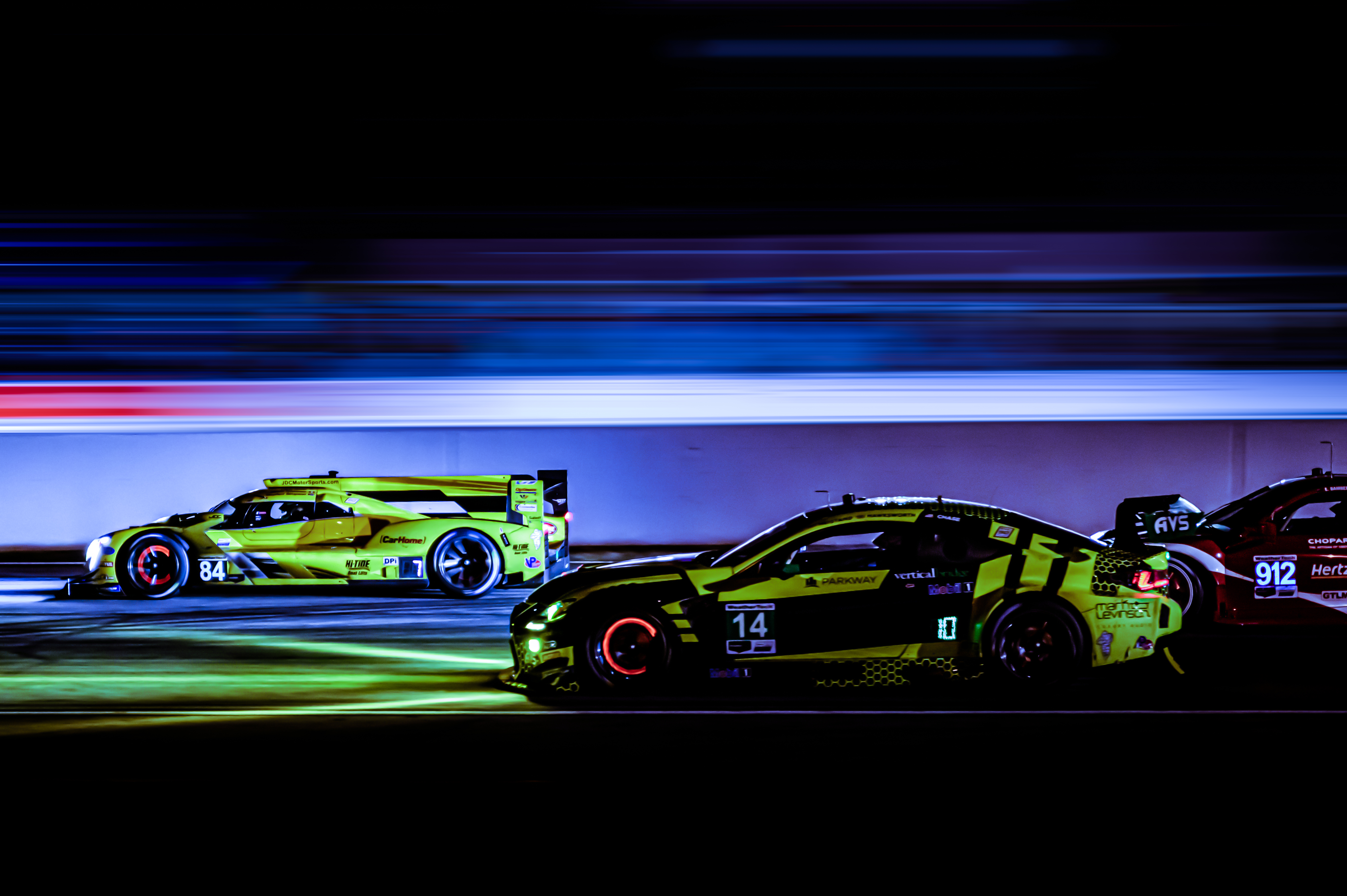
Miller (left) lapping cars at the 2019 Petit Le Mans.

In 2017, Miller and JDC-Miller MotorSports moved to the Prototype class and scored a second place podium finish at the 6 Hours of Watkins Glen. Their success led to sponsorship from GAINSCO/Bob Stallings Racing for the 2018 season and the return of the No. 99 Red Dragon. Miller went on to win that year's 6 Hours of Watkins Glen with Misha Goikhberg and Stephen Simpson, the first Prototype and overall victory for JDC-Miller MotorSports.

In 2019, Miller drove a Cadillac DPi-V.R for JDC-Miller MotorSports in the Michelin Endurance Cup.

== Motorsports career results ==
=== American open–wheel racing ===
(key) (Races in bold indicate pole position; races in italics indicate fastest lap)

==== F2000 Championship Series ====
Year	Team	1	2	3	4	5	6	7	8	9	10	11	12	13	14	Rank	Points
2008	JDC MotorSports	VIR; 3	VIR; 10	ATL; 5	ATL; 6	WGL; 3	WGL; 9	MOH; 2	MOH; 8	ROA; 2	ROA; 5	MOS; 8	MOS; 5	NJM; 7	NJM; 20	4th	382
2009	JDC MotorSports	VIR; 18	VIR; 1	LRP; 2	LRP; 2	MOS; 1	MOS; 2	WGL; 1	WGL; 12	SUM; 2	SUM; 2	MOH; 5	MOH; 1			1st	458

==== Star Mazda Championship ====
Year	Team	1	2	3	4	5	6	7	8	9	10	11	12	13	Rank	Points
2009	JDC MotorSports	SEB	VIR	MMP	NJ1	NJ2	WIS	IOW	ILL	ILL	QUE	ONT	ATL; Ret	LAG; 19	-	0
2010	JDC MotorSports	SEB; 9	STP; 15	LAG; 7	ORP; 13	IOW; 13	NJ1; 8	NJ2; 14	ACC; 22	ACC; 13	TRO; 14	ROA; 17	MOS; 8	ATL; 10	11th	313
2011	JDC MotorSports	STP; 5	BAR	IND	MIL	IOW	MOS; 7	TRO	TRO	SON	BAL	LAG			17th	61

=== Complete WeatherTech SportsCar Championship results ===
(key) (Races in bold indicate pole position) (Races in italics indicate fastest lap)

Year	Entrant	Class	Make	Engine	1	2	3	4	5	6	7	8	9	10	11	Pos.	Pts
2014	JDC-Miller MotorSports	PC	Oreca FLM09	Chevrolet LS3 6.2 L V8	DAY; DNS	SEB; 4	LGA; 6	KAN; 10	WGL; 6	IMS; 7	ELK; 3	VIR; 7	COA; 7	PET; 6		7th	235
2015	JDC-Miller MotorSports	PC	Oreca FLM09	Chevrolet LS3 6.2 L V8	DAY; 3	SEB; 4	LGA	DET	WGL; 5	MOS	LIM	ELK; 7	COA	PET; 5		14th	111
2016	JDC-Miller MotorSports	PC	Oreca FLM09	Chevrolet LS3 6.2 L V8	DAY; 1	SEB; 4	LBH	LGA	DET	WGL; 4	MOS	LIM	ELK	COA	PET; 3	13th	125
2017	JDC-Miller MotorSports	P	Oreca 07	Gibson GK428 4.2 L V8	DAY; 5	SEB; 4	LBH	COA	DET	WGL; 2	MOS	ELK	LGA	PET; 6		15th	111
2018	JDC-Miller MotorSports	P	Oreca 07	Gibson GK428 4.2 L V8	DAY; 7	SEB; 7	LBH	MOH	DET	WGL; 1	MOS	ELK	LGA	PET; 10		23rd	104
2019	JDC-Miller MotorSports	DPi	Cadillac DPi-V.R	Cadillac 5.5L V8	DAY; 10	SEB; 8	LBH	MOH	DET	WGL; 9	MOS	ELK	LGA	PET; 5		17th	92
2020	JDC-Miller MotorSports	DPi	Cadillac DPi-V.R	Cadillac 5.5 L V8	DAY; 5	DAY; 7	SEB	ELK; 7	ATL	MOH	ATL; 8	LGA	SEB			15th	97
