= 2018 24 Hours of Daytona =

Motor race

Previous: 2017	Next: 2019
Index: Races | Winners

The track layout of the Daytona International Speedway combined road course, where the race was held

The 2018 24 Hours of Daytona (formally the 56th Rolex 24 at Daytona) was an International Motor Sports Association (IMSA)-sanctioned 24-hour automobile endurance race for Daytona Prototype and Grand Touring sports cars held at the Daytona International Speedway combined road course in Daytona Beach, Florida, on January 27 to 28, 2018. It was the first of twelve 2018 IMSA SportsCar Championship races, the 56th 24 Hours of Daytona, and the first in the four-round North American Endurance Cup.

Renger van der Zande for Wayne Taylor Racing started from pole position and led for most of the opening hour. Filipe Albuquerque of Mustang Sampling Racing took the lead after the first round of pit stops and kept it for five hours before losing it to Team Penske's Hélio Castroneves. Whelen Engineering Racing (WER), Penske and Mustang Sampling traded the lead several times over the next 12 hours. Mustang Sampling's Albuquerque, Christian Fittipaldi and João Barbosa led the final third of the race to win in a record-breaking distance of 808 laps and 2,876.48 miles (4,629.25 km) and take the lead of the Prototype Drivers' and Teams' Championships. Mike Conway, Eric Curran, Stuart Middleton and Felipe Nasr were second in the sister WER car. Third were CORE Autosport's Jon Bennett, Colin Braun, Romain Dumas and Loïc Duval.

Ford Chip Ganassi Racing (CGR) drivers Scott Dixon, Ryan Briscoe and Richard Westbrook, won the Grand Touring Le Mans (GTLM) class, after passing the sister team of Sébastien Bourdais, Dirk Müller and Joey Hand at its final pit stop. The team led all bar nine laps in the category to claim CGR's 200th motor racing victory and the lead of the GTLM points lead. The pole-sitting Corvette Racing trio of Antonio García, Jan Magnussen and Mike Rockenfeller completed the class podium. Having led the last four and a half hours, Mirko Bortolotti, Rik Breukers, Rolf Ineichen and Franck Perera of GRT Grasser Racing Team won the Grand Touring Daytona (GTD) category to claim Lamborghini's first 24-hour race victory and the lead of the class points standings, despite starting from the back of the grid for failing a mandatory post-qualifying stall test. Michael Shank Racing's A. J. Allmendinger, Trent Hindman, Katherine Legge and Álvaro Parente was second and Andrea Caldarelli, Bryce Miller, Bryan Sellers and Madison Snow placed Paul Miller Racing's car in third.

== Background ==
=== Preview ===
Daytona International Speedway in 2015

NASCAR founder Bill France Sr., who built the Daytona International Speedway in 1959, conceived the 24 Hours of Daytona as a race to attract European sports car endurance racing to the United States and provide international exposure to Daytona. It is informally considered part of the "Triple Crown of Endurance Racing" with the 12 Hours of Sebring and the 24 Hours of Le Mans.

International Motor Sports Association's (IMSA) president Scott Atherton confirmed the race was part of the schedule for the 2018 IMSA SportsCar Championship (IMSA SCC) in August 2017. It was the fifth consecutive year it was part of the IMSA SCC, and the 56th 24 Hours of Daytona. The 24 Hours of Daytona was the first of twelve scheduled sports car endurance races of 2018 by IMSA, and the first of four races of the North American Endurance Cup (NAEC). It took place at the 12-turn 3.56 mi (5.73 km) Daytona International Speedway combined road course in Daytona Beach, Florida, from January 27 to 28.

=== Entry list ===
A total of 50 cars were officially entered for the 24 Hours of Daytona with most entries being in the Prototype and Grand Touring Daytona (GTD) categories. The 2017 race winner, Wayne Taylor Racing (WTR), returned to defend their title. Three existing teams, Action Express Racing (AER), Spirit of Daytona Racing and Extreme Speed Motorsports (ESM), each fielded two Daytona Prototype International (DPi) Cadillac DPi-V.R and Nissan Onroak DPi cars. WTR sent one Cadillac DPi-V.R chassis to Daytona. Penske Racing made their full-time sports car racing comeback for the first time since the 2009 Rolex Sports Car Series, fielding two Honda-powered Acura ARX-05 DPis for 2018. Mazda returned to sports car racing after withdrawing with three races left in the 2017 season so their duo of RT24-Ps could be re-engineered by German outfit Team Joest. They were joined by ten global-specification Le Mans Prototype 2 (LMP2) cars, represented by three out of the four major chassis: six Oreca 07s entered by JDC–Miller MotorSports, Jackie Chan DCR JOTA (two each), Performance Tech Motorsports (PTR), CORE Autosport (one each). a trio of Ligier JS P217s utilised by PR1/Mathiasen Motorsports (one) and United Autosports (two), and one Riley Mk. 30 from BAR1 Motorsports.

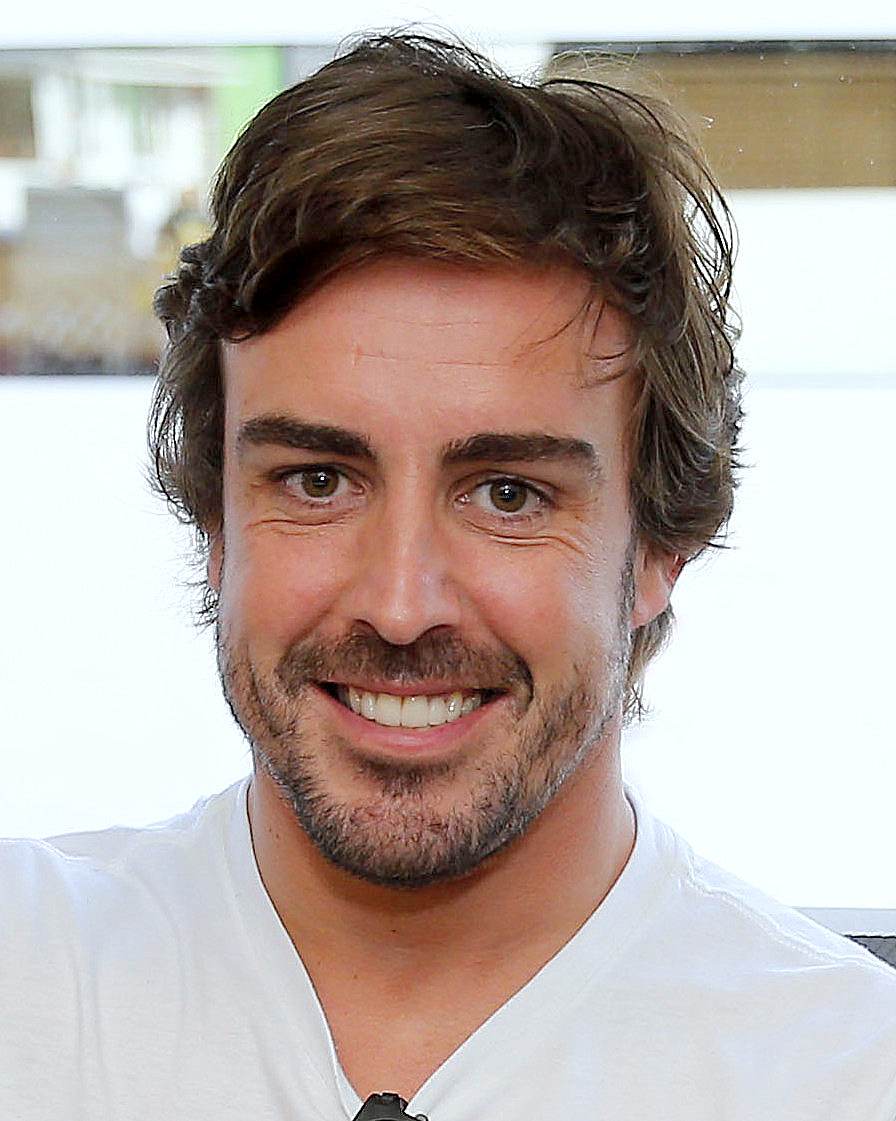
Fernando Alonso, the two-time Formula One World Champion (pictured in 2016) made a one-off appearance for United Autosports for Daytona.

After the aging Prototype Challenge class was retired after 2017 due to declining interest from teams, Grand Touring Le Mans (GTLM) was made the highest-ranking class below the Prototype category in the IMSA SCC Championship. Nine cars from five manufacturers were entered for Daytona. The BMW M8 GTE made its racing competition debut at the track; Team RLL entered two chassis for 2018. Porsche fielded two 911 RSRs for the second successive season, and Chip Ganassi Racing (CGR) entered their two Ford GTs for the third consecutive year. Ferrari aligned with Risi Competizione for one 488 GTE. Corvette Racing transported their two aging C7.Rs to Daytona. GTD featured 21 cars amongst 8 GT3 manufacturers. Ferrari was the most represented marque in GTD with four 488s: two by Scuderia Corsa and one each from Spirit of Race and Risi Competizione. A mix of teams and automotive brands made up the rest of the GTD field, including two GRT Grasser Racing Team-entered Lamborghini Huracáns with a third by Paul Miller Racing (PSR), and a trio of Riley Motorsports-entered Mercedes-AMGs. Michael Shank Racing (MSR) and HART entered three Acura NSXs and a trio of Porsche 911 Rs with one each from Park Place Motorsports, Wright Motorsports and Manthey Racing. Other cars fielded were a duo of Audi R8 LMS from Magnus Racing and Land Motorsport, two Lexus RC Fs by 3GT Racing and a BMW M6 from Turner Motorsport.

Each car was driven by two drivers who contested the entire IMSA SCC season. They were joined by one NAEC racer and one or two extra drivers. These additional participants were recruited from a variety of racing categories, including the FIA World Endurance Championship (such as Gustavo Menezes for JDC-Miller MotorSports), the Deutsche Tourenwagen Masters (such as René Rast for Mazda Team Joest), and the IndyCar Series (such as Ryan Hunter-Reay for WTR) among others. Some drivers competed at Daytona on a one-off basis, such as Fernando Alonso, a two-time Formula One World Champion, Williams driver Lance Stroll, Formula E racers Felix Rosenqvist and António Félix da Costa, A. J. Allmendinger, Justin Marks, Brendan Gaughan and Austin Cindric from NASCAR, and 2017 Formula Three European Champion Lando Norris. Stuart Middleton won the Sunoco Whelen Challenge by taking the GT4 category title in his debut year in the British GT Championship, earning him a seat with AER.

=== Pre-event balance of performance changes ===
The week before the official three-day test session at the circuit, IMSA altered the balance of performance in all three categories to create parity in the classes. 10 kg (22 lb) of weight was added to the Cadillac DPi-V.Rs compared to 2017 but the decrease of handling abilities was countered by having the car's top speed raised by having its air restrictor increased by 1.8 mm (0.071 in). The duo of Nissan Onroak DPis and the two Acura ARX-05s had their weight increased to 940 kg (2,070 lb) to lower their performance, 10 kg (22 lb) more than the LMP2 chassis and the pair of Mazda RT24-Ps. The Nissan and Mazda engines were not altered because IMSA was satisfied with their performances, but the series changed the aerodynamic packages on some Prototypes which affected their handing abilities. The debuting BMW M8 GTE's weight was established at 1,250 kg (2,760 lb) and its turbocharger boost curve was revised over its predecessor, the BMW M6 GTLM. The Mercedes-AMG GTD car had its top speed raised slightly with the enlargement of its air restrictor by 1 mm (0.039 in).

== Testing ==
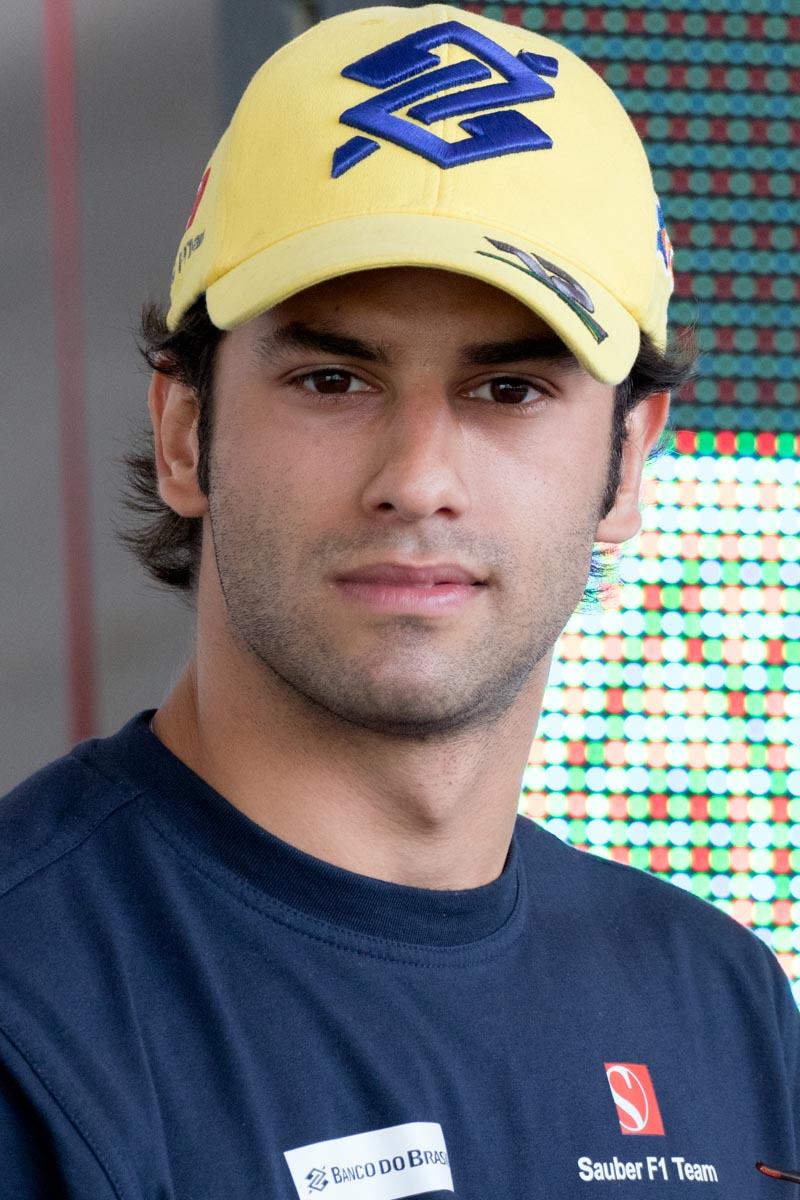
Felipe Nasr (pictured in 2015) set the fastest overall lap in testing for Action Express Racing.

All 50 entries were involved in three days of testing divided into seven sessions held at the circuit from January 5 to 7. João Barbosa set the fastest time early in the first day's running with a time of 1:37.266 for the No. 5 Mustang Sampling Racing Cadillac. Co-driver Filipe Albuquerque later improved in the second session to a 1:37.196 lap. The fastest LMP2 lap came from Colin Braun's No. 54 CORE Oreca in second, and the No. 10 WTR Cadillac of Renger van der Zande was third. Tristan Vautier set the fourth-fastest lap for Spirit of Daytona in its No. 90 Cadillac. Ho-Pin Tung's No. 78 Jackie Chan Oreca 07 was fifth. Laurens Vanthoor led GTLM in the No. 912 Porsche 911 RSR with a 1:44.065 lap in the second session, and teammate Nick Tandy's sister car was third. They were separated by Richard Westbrook's No. 67 CGR Ford. GTD was led by Rolf Ineichen's and later Franck Perera's No. 11 Grasser Lamborghini from Matteo Cairoli's No. 59 Manthey Porsche.

The second day's testing saw Felipe Nasr lead in the No. 31 AER Cadillac at 1:36.793. Jordan Taylor improved WTR's Cadillac best time to second. Albuquerue was slower than the day before and was third. Eddie Cheever III, driving the No. 90 Spirit Cadillac, was fourth-fastest by going faster than co-driver Vautier in the day's second session. The No. 78 Jackie Chan Oreca was the highest-placed LMP2 car in fifth with Alex Brundle aboard. The No. 66 CGR Ford of Sébastien Bourdais moved to the top of GTLM with a lap of 1:43.795 in the fourth session. Gianmaria Bruni was second-quickest in the No. 912 Porsche. Ryan Briscoe put the sister No. 67 CGR Ford third, and Alessandro Pier Guidi's No. 62 Risi Ferrari was fourth-fastest. GTD was still led by the No. 11 Grasser Lamborghini courtesy of Ineichen's lap on the first day. Manthey's No. 59 Porsche remained second; driver Sven Müller improved its best lap time.

The third and final day of testing featured a qualifying session to determine the locations of the team's pit stalls and garages for the race three weeks later. Nasr's No. 31 AER Cadillac set the fastest overall time with a 1:35.806 lap. The second-fastest car was the No. 90 Spirit Cadillac of Vautier and Albuquerque putting the No. 5 Mustang Sampling Cadillac in third position. WTR were fourth after a lap by Van der Zande and Dane Cameron took fifth in the No. 6 Penske Acura ARX-05. Joey Hand set the fastest overall GTLM time in the No. 66 CGR Ford with a 1:43.610 lap. Oliver Gavin's No. 4 Chevrolet Corvette C7.R was second, followed by the sister No. 67 Ford GT driven by Briscoe. Ineichen's lap from the first day of testing was never bettered and the No. 11 Grasser Lamborghini remained the fastest GTD car. Cairoli's first session lap in the Manthey Porsche was fast enough to keep it second in class.

After testing, IMSA adjusted the balance of performance for the second time in all categories after analysing data of the car's performances. The Cadillac DPi-V.Rs had their fuel capacity enlarged by 1 L (0.22 imp gal; 0.26 US gal) along with their refuelling restrictors by 0.5 L (0.11 imp gal; 0.13 US gal) but their air restrictors were 0.6 mm (0.024 in). The size of the fuel tanks in the Acura ARX-05 and the Nissan Onroak DPis were increased by 4 L (0.88 imp gal; 1.1 US gal) and 2 L (0.44 imp gal; 0.53 US gal) with the size of both car's fuel restrictors increased by 1.5 mm (0.059 in). Nissan Onroak DPis boost pressure was increased to peak at 7,100 rpm. The Mazda RT24-Ps were 15 kg (33 lb) lighter. Its rev limit was raised to 8,600 rpm and its air restrictor was lengthened by 0.5 mm (0.020 in). The Acura, Nissan and Mazda DPis gurney flaps were adjusted for aerodynamic purposes.

All GTLM cars bar the Ferrari 488 GTE had the size of their fuel tanks adjusted. The Chevrolet Corvette's C7.R's top speed was lowered through rear wing angles alterations by two degrees, while the Ford GT's angles were increased by three degrees. The Porsche 911 RSRs performance was lowered as its fuel restrictors were reduced in size by 1 mm (0.039 in). In GTD, the Acura NSX GT3 lost 10 kg (22 lb) in weight and the Mercedes-AMG was made 15 kg (33 lb) heavier. Turbocharger adjustments were made to the Audi R8 LMS, Lamborghini Huracán, and the BMW M6 cars.

== Practice and qualifying ==
There were four practice sessions preceding the start of the race on Saturday, three on Thursday and one on Friday. The first two one-hour sessions were on Thursday morning and afternoon. The third held later that evening ran for 90 minutes; the fourth on Friday morning lasted an hour.

Rast's No. 77 Mazda set the fastest lap of the first practice session at 1:37.428, 0.007 seconds faster than Vautier's Spirit's No. 90 Cadillac. Jordan Taylor put the No. 10 Wayne Taylor Cadillac in third overall. Albuquerue placed the No. 5 Mustang Sampling car fourth. The highest-placed LMP2 car was Brundle's No. 78 Jackie Chan entry in fifth place. Early in the session, Phil Hanson made an error on cold tires that put the front of the United Autosports Ligier into the turn five tire barrier. Practice was red-flagged for 8 minutes and 49 seconds so his car could be removed from the circuit. In GTLM, the No. 66 CGR Ford of Hand led with a lap of 1:44.571. Alessandro Pier Guidi put the No. 62 Risi Ferrari second. Vanthoor in the No. 912 Porsche was third. Miguel Molina's No. 82 Risi car was fastest in GTD. Pedro Lamy set the second-fastest class lap in Spirit of Race's No. 51 entry.

In the second practice session, Hélio Castroneves in the No. 6 Penske Acura ARX-05 recorded the fastest lap of the day with a 1:37.096 effort, ahead of the No. 22 ESM Nissan of Nicolas Lapierre and Albquerque's No. 5 Mustang Sampling car. The leading LMP2 car was Colin Braun behind the wheel of the No. 54 CORE car in fourth. Jonathan Bomarito was fifth in Mazda's No. 55 car. Patrick Pilet led GTLM in the No. 911 Porsche with a 1:43.902 lap set late in the session. Jan Magnussen's No. 3 Corvette was second. Westbrook in the No. 66 CGR Ford was third in GTLM. Álvaro Parente's No. 86 MSR Acura-NSX GT3 was fastest in GTD, while Molina was 0.242 seconds slower in the No. 82 Risi Ferrari.

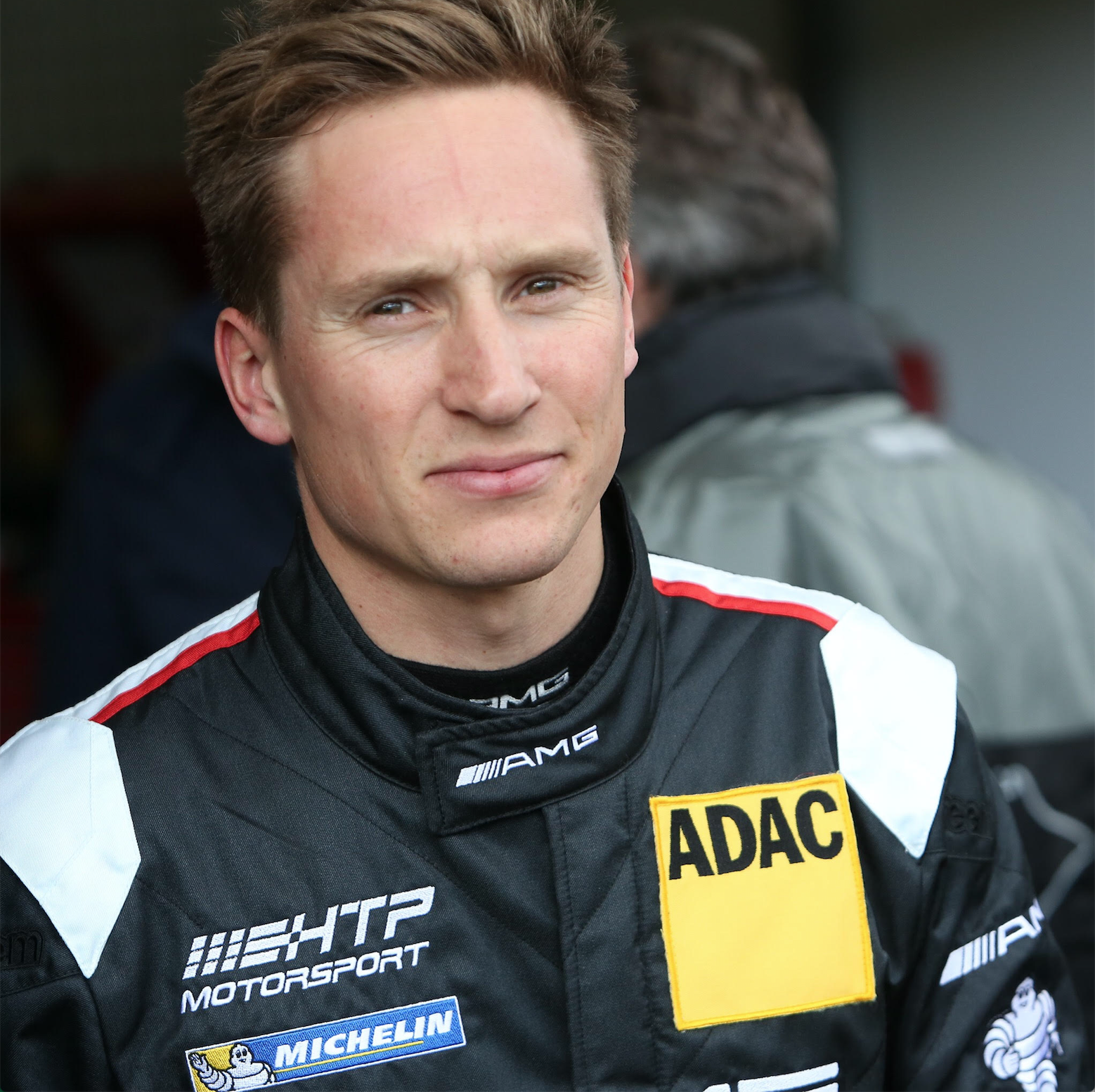
Renger van der Zande (pictured in 2016) took the overall pole position for Wayne Taylor Racing.

Thursday afternoon's 75-minute qualifying session was divided into three groups. All three categories had 15-minute individual sessions, and regulations stipulated teams to nominate a single driver to qualify their cars. The competitors' fastest lap times determined the starting order with the grid arranged to put the Prototype and GTLM cars ahead of all GTD entries. Van Der Zande for WTR took the third pole position of his career, on his final lap with a time of 1:36.083; he ran deep at turn five through later braking. This was WTR's first pole position at Daytona since Max Angelelli in the 2010 event. He was joined on the grid's front row by Castroneves who had pole position for Penske in the closing minutes until Van der Zande's lap.

On his final timed lap, Albuquerue qualified the No. 5 Mustang Sampling Cadillac third, and Patricio O'Ward took fourth in the No. 38 PTR Oreca to become the field's highest-placed LMP2 car. Early pace setter Vautier in Spirit's No. 90 car was fifth, and Robin Frijns' No. 78 Jackie Chan car was sixth. An electrical fault left Nasr seventh. Braun's No. 54 CORE car, Bomarito's No. 55 Mazda, and Cameron's No. 6 Penske were eighth to tenth. Lapierre set no lap time after he locked his brakes on his first timed lap and damaged the No. 22 ESM car's front-left suspension against the tire barriers at the West Horseshoe. ESM's No. 2 entry did not participate due to a precautionary engine switch. Mazda's No. 77 car was absent because of a pre-qualifying data irregularity.

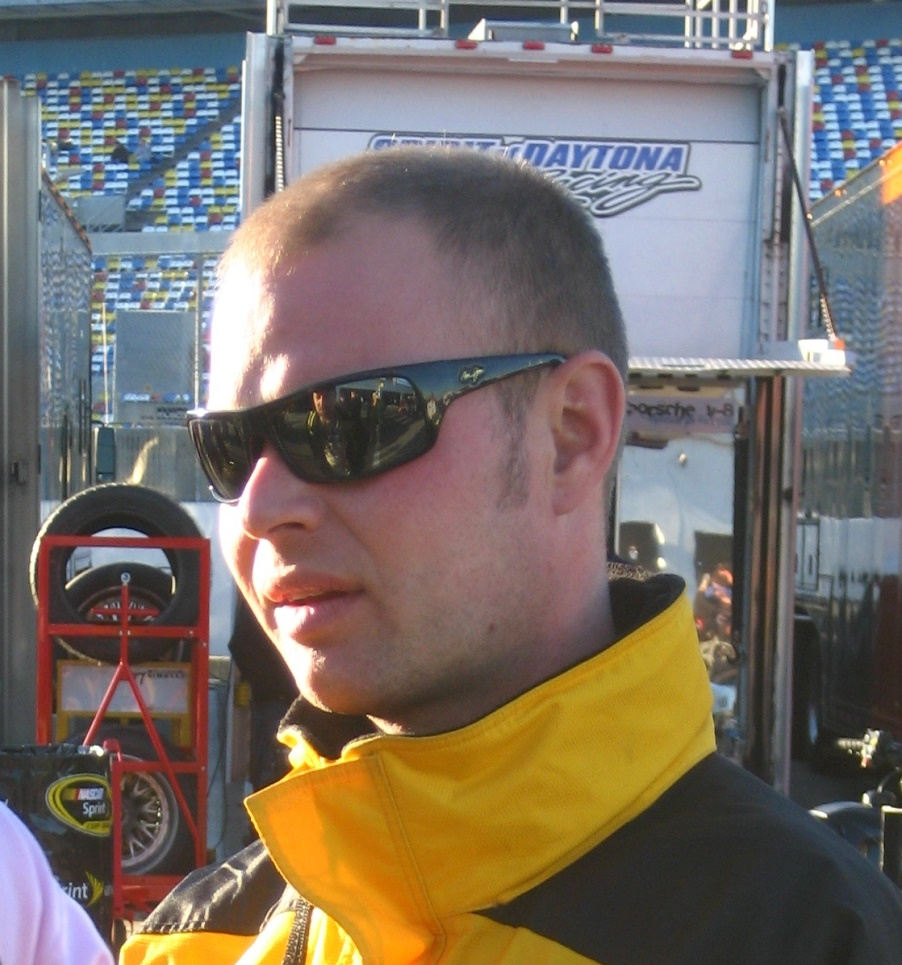
Jan Magnussen (pictured in 2009) achieved pole position in the GTLM class for Corvette Racing.

In GTLM, Magnussen's No. 3 Corvette drafted his teammate Gavin to achieve his fourth class pole position, and bettered Hand's 2017 category lap track record with a time of 1:42.779. Magnussen was 0.019 seconds faster than Hand's second-placed No. 66 Ford. Following in third was Vanthoor's No. 912 Porsche, with the sister No. 911 car of Pilet fourth. Westbrook was fifth in GTLM in the slower Ford. Daniel Serra in the No. 51 Spirit of Race Ferrari 488 GT3 was the first driver to record a GTD lap time in the 1:46-range midway through, securing his second career pole position, and his first in any class since the 2016 Monterey Grand Prix with a 1:46.407 lap. Molina made it an all-Ferrari class front row in the No. 82 Risi car. Mirko Bortolotti's No. 11 GRT Lamborghini was third-fastest, but the car was demoted to the rear of the GTD field for failing a mandatory stall test at a post-qualifying technical inspection. Hence, Jack Hawksworth's No. 15 3GT Racing Lexus RC F GT3 started third. Alessandro Balzan's No. 63 Scuderia Ferrari started fourth, with Dominik Baumann's slower Lexus fifth. Two GTD cars failed to record a lap time: The No. 73 Park Place Porsche's tire punctured on its out lap, and P1's No. 73 Mercedes-AMG GT3 had brake problems.

The third practice session ran at night and saw Vautier's No. 90 Cadillac set the fastest overall lap of 1:37.210. Castroneves was almost two-tenths of a second behind in second, with the No. 22 ESM Nissan of Pipo Derani third. Harry Tincknell in the No. 55 Mazda was fourth and Norris' quicker United Autosports car was fifth. Kyle Masson caused the session's first stoppage when his No. 38 PTR Oreca ran out of fuel on the track requiring recovery back to the pit lane. Later, Menezes' No. 99 JDC-Miller car right-rear tire failed entering turn six at high-speed. Though he controlled his car throughout and avoided hitting the wall, practice was stopped for 12 minutes. Ford occupied first and second in GTLM with Bourdais faster than his teammate Westbrook by two-tenths of a second. Bortolotti's No. 11 Grasser Lamborghini Huracán led GTD, and Sam Bird, in the No. 64 Scuderia Ferrari, was second in class.

Mike Conway led the last practice session in the No. 31 WER car with a lap of 1:36.865. Stroll's No. 37 Jackie Chan car was second-fastest. The No. 90 Cadillac of Vautier set the third-quickest lap. Rast's No. 77 Mazda, along with Albuquerque's No. 5 Mustang Sampling car were fourth and fifth. Though the session passed relatively peacefully, the right-rear tire on the No. 32 United Autosports vehicle of Bruno Senna blew on the track. In GTLM, Hand was again fastest in the class with a lap of 1:44.602. Bruni was second-fastest in the No. 912 Porsche, and his teammate Pilet took third in the sister No. 911 car. Cairoli set the fastest time in GTD, followed by Jeroen Bleekemolen's No. 33 Riley Mercedes-AMG GT3 car.

=== Pre-race ===
Tomy Drissi withdrew from the race due to business commitments, leaving the No. 20 BAR1 Riley Mk. 30 to operate as a four-person entry. The No. 2 ESM Motorsports, the No. 71 P1 Mercedes-AMG, and the No. 77 Mazda entries were sent to the rear of their respective class fields because their teams changed their respective starting drivers. Although PSR and Mazda changed engines in their respective cars (the No. 48 Lamborghini and the No. 77 RT24-P), they were not demoted any grid places since the race lasted more than six hours.

=== Qualifying results ===
Pole positions in each class are indicated in bold. P stands for Daytona Prototype International, GTLM (Grand Touring Le Mans) and GTD (Grand Touring Daytona).

Final qualifying classification
Pos.	Class	No.	Team	Driver	Time	Gap	Grid
1	**P**	**10**	**Wayne Taylor Racing**	**Renger van der Zande**	**1:36.083**	—	1
2	P	7	Acura Team Penske	Hélio Castroneves	1:36.090	+0.007	2
3	P	5	Mustang Sampling Racing	Filipe Albuquerque	1:36.194	+0.111	3
4	P	38	Performance Tech Motorsports	Patricio O'Ward	1:36.318	+0.235	4
5	P	90	Spirit of Daytona Racing	Tristan Vautier	1:36.472	+0.389	5
6	P	37	Jackie Chan DCR JOTA	Robin Frijns	1:36.492	+0.409	6
7	P	31	Whelen Engineering Racing	Felipe Nasr	1:36.508	+0.425	7
8	P	54	CORE Autosport	Colin Braun	1:36.567	+0.484	8
9	P	55	Mazda Team Joest	Jonathan Bomarito	1:36.633	+0.550	9
10	P	6	Acura Team Penske	Dane Cameron	1:36.931	+0.848	10
11	P	78	Jackie Chan DCR JOTA	Alex Brundle	1:36.982	+0.899	11
12	P	85	JDC–Miller MotorSports	Simon Trummer	1:37.005	+0.922	12
13	P	23	United Autosports	Fernando Alonso	1:37.008	+0.925	13
14	P	99	JDC–Miller MotorSports	Stephen Simpson	1:37.124	+1.041	14
15	P	32	United Autosports	Bruno Senna	1:38.186	+2.103	15
16	P	52	AFS/PR1 Mathiasen Motorsports	Gustavo Yacamán	1:38.773	+2.690	16
17	P	20	BAR1 Motorsports	Alex Popow	1:41.778	+5.695	17
18	**GTLM**	**3**	**Corvette Racing**	**Jan Magnussen**	**1:42.779**	**+6.696**	21
19	GTLM	66	Ford Chip Ganassi Racing	Joey Hand	1:42.798	+6.715	22
20	GTLM	912	Porsche GT Team	Laurens Vanthoor	1:42.927	+6.844	23
21	GTLM	911	Porsche GT Team	Patrick Pilet	1:43.062	+6.979	24
22	GTLM	67	Ford Chip Ganassi Racing	Richard Westbrook	1:43.091	+7.008	25
23	GTLM	4	Corvette Racing	Oliver Gavin	1:43.453	+7.370	26
24	GTLM	62	Risi Competizione	Toni Vilander	1:43.601	+7.518	27
25	GTLM	25	BMW Team RLL	Alexander Sims	1:43.948	+7.865	28
26	GTLM	24	BMW Team RLL	John Edwards	1:44.413	+8.330	29
27	**GTD**	**51**	**Spirit of Race**	**Daniel Serra**	**1:46.049**	**+9.966**	30
28	P	22	Tequila Patrón ESM	Nicolas Lapierre	1:46.129	+10.046	18
29	GTD	82	Risi Competizione	Miguel Molina	1:46.502	+10.419	31
30	GTD	11	GRT Grasser Racing Team	Mirko Bortolotti	1:46.658	+10.575	50^{1}
31	GTD	15	3GT Racing	Jack Hawksworth	1:46.714	+10.631	32
32	GTD	63	Scuderia Corsa	Alessandro Balzan	1:47.055	+10.972	33
33	GTD	14	3GT Racing	Dominik Baumann	1:47.186	+11.103	34
34	GTD	86	Michael Shank Racing with Curb-Agajanian	Álvaro Parente	1:47.251	+11.168	35
35	GTD	29	Montaplast by Land-Motorsport	Sheldon van der Linde	1:47.273	+11.190	36
36	GTD	58	Wright Motorsports	Robert Renauer	1:47.291	+11.208	37
37	GTD	96	Turner Motorsport	Cameron Lawrence	1:47.348	+11.265	38
38	GTD	44	Magnus Racing	Andy Lally	1:47.442	+11.359	39
39	GTD	59	Manthey Racing	Sven Müller	1:47.587	+11.504	40
40	GTD	33	Mercedes-AMG Team Riley Motorsports	Ben Keating	1:47.796	+11.713	41
41	GTD	64	Scuderia Corsa	Sam Bird	1:47.839	+11.756	42
42	GTD	69	HART	Ryan Eversley	1:47.862	+11.779	43
43	GTD	48	Paul Miller Racing	Bryce Miller	1:48.181	+12.098	44
44	GTD	93	Michael Shank Racing with Curb-Agajanian	Côme Ledogar	1:48.239	+12.156	45
45	GTD	75	SunEnergy1 Racing	Kenny Habul	1:48.326	+12.243	46
46	GTD	19	GRT Grasser Racing Team	Christoph Lenz	1:51.531	+15.448	47
–	P	77	Mazda Team Joest	Did not participate			19^{2}
–	P	2	Tequila Patrón ESM	Did not participate			20^{2}
–	GTD	73	Park Place Motorsports	Did not participate			48
–	GTD	71	P1 Motorsports	Did not participate			49^{2}

Notes:

- **^1** – The No. 11 GRT Grasser Team Racing Lamborghini Huracán was sent to the rear of the GTD field for failing a post-qualifying stall test.
- **^2** – The No. 2 Extreme Speed Motorsports, the No. 71 P1 Motorsports Mercedes-AMG, and the No. 77 Mazda entries were sent to the rear of their respective class fields because their teams had changed their respective starting drivers.

== Race ==
=== Start ===
Weather conditions at the start of the race were dry but cloudy. The air temperature throughout was between 64 and 77 °F (18 and 25 °C) and the track temperature ranged from 62 to 80 °F (17 to 27 °C); conditions were expected to remain consistent throughout the race, but a 70 per cent chance of rain was forecast for Sunday. CGR founder and owner Chip Ganassi waved the green flag at 14:40 Eastern Standard Time (UTC−05:00) to start the proceedings. Fifty cars were due to take the start, but Robert Renauer spun on cold tires and heavily damaged the left-hand quarter of the No. 58 Wright Motorsports car when he hit the turn five inside wall during the first formation lap. Extensive repairs to the car were carried out for the next two hours and eight minutes. Van Der Zande led from the start with Castroneves close behind. Nasr moved to third by the third lap and overtook Castroneves around the outside for second at turn seven. He lost third to Albuquerque two corners later. The first round of green flag pit stops for fuel began on lap 17, with Van der Zande stopping two laps later. He lost first to Albuquerque after all pit stops were carried out. Hand took the GTLM lead from Magnussen in the opening minutes. Westbrook was also an early mover but fell to third after a slow pit stop to rectify brake issues. Jeffrey Schmidt's No. 29 Land Motorsport car moved to the front of GTD by passing Serra and having a faster pit stop than Molina who overtook Serra.

Early in the second hour, problems during the second pit stop phase affected several cars. The right-front wheel on Bomarito's No. 55 Mazda detached and rested on the Armco barriers lining the circuit. Bomarito slowed to 45 mph (72 km/h) on his way to the pit lane, putting him three laps behind the overall leader; Tincknell relieved him at his pit box. Oliver Jarvis' sister No. 77 car was then transported into its garage for a downshifting problem that put him behind the GTLM leaders and five laps behind the overall pace setters. Santiago Creel relieved Molina in the No. 82 Risi Ferrari, but a flash fire affected the car when fuel ignited at its pit stop after the nozzle was disconnected. The entry dropped 24 laps as it was tended to. Ricky Taylor's No. 7 Penske car was delayed by its left-hand door loosening due to a broken latch; he remained on the same lap as the overall leader. During this period, Vautier, Alonso and Barbosa all led outright. ESM gained the most positions: the No. 22 car of Derani had gained 15 places from starting 18th, while Olivier Pla's sister No. 22 entry overcame an earlier cut tire that necessitated an unscheduled pit stop to run in seventh.

Derani was gaining on Barbosa when the first full course caution period of the race was activated for 14 minutes. James French in the No. 38 PTR Oreca had stopped on the oval banking at turn seven halfway through the third hour because of no fuel. Barbosa kept first from Derani at the restart. Two Jackie Chan cars separated the pair allowing Barbosa to draw clear and re-establish his advantage upfront, which grew to seven seconds. Derani fell out of contention in the battle for the lead soon after his right-rear tire burst, shredding the right-rear quarter of his car and sending him to pit road for repairs. Matt McMurry in the No. 90 Spirit of Race car was demoted to third when Hunter-Reay's No. 10 WTR entry, Simon Pagenaud's No. 6 Penske, and Middleton's No. 31 WER car got past him the lap after the restart. Middleton came into contact with Pagenaud at turn five; in spite of both remaining on the lead lap, Middleton earned a drive-through penalty. As night fell, James Calado's No. 62 Risi car, and Nunez' No. 77 Mazda, picked up punctures at the rear of their cars within 28 minutes of each other.

=== Night ===
Before the fourth hour's end, Jordan Taylor's right-rear tire burst on the banking entering turn 12. Damage was minimal since he was near the pit lane and repairs took 29 seconds. Light rain began falling just as the fifth hour began and several cars in all categories were caught out by the change of conditions. Soon after, the rain intensified enough for most of the field to make pit stops for rain tires. Marcel Fässler stayed on the circuit but was ten seconds slower than teammate Magnussen and was overtaken by Bourdais and Scott Dixon's Fords. The rain later tapered off, but the disparity of drying of the banking and the infield sections was problematic for rain tire equipped cars. The first major incident in GTLM came 4 hours and 42 minutes in when Bill Auberlen's No. 25 BMW M8's right-front tire was cut 10 mm (1.0 cm) from debris on the banking leaving turn six. He stayed off the wall and returned to his garage to repair front-right bodywork damage. Pilet remained on dry tires and took the GTLM lead but dropped to fourth by the end of hour six. In the meantime, Fittipaldi lost the overall lead to Castroneves before Conway took it after he made a pit stop two laps later than both drivers.

Norris was the best-placed LMP2 car and was sometimes the fastest overall and gained positions through superior fuel economy before Hanson took over the No. 23 vehicle. Despite a front nose change at his pit stop, Castroneves retook the lead after Curran took over from Conway when the No. 5 car stopped. Castroneves was soon being gained on by Albuquerque who relieved Fittipaldi. The two drew level when Albuquerque used his car's extra torque to get a better exit out of the turn three hairpin. Albuquerque overtook Castroneves because the latter elected not to risk driving beside him entering the kink. Albuquerque opened up a five-second gap before handing the lead back to Castroneves ten minutes before the eighth hour ended on pit stop rotation. Don Yount lost control of the No. 96 Turner BMW M6's rear at the Bus Stop chicane and hit the tire wall heavily. No caution was needed. Soon after, Hanson's right-rear tire blew turning into the Bus Stop chicane, significantly damaging his car's bodywork. Hanson required an engine cover and rear wing replacement and Alonso took over from him. Castroneves again lost the lead to Albuquerque when he overshot his pit box and was half a minute adrift into hour nine. Third-placed Van der Zande picked up another right-rear puncture on the No. 10 WTR car at the Bus Stop chicane; the carcass delaminated and deranged its bodywork and radiator line, forcing it into the garage for repairs. It dropped ten laps to the overall leader.

McMurry brought the No. 90 Spirit of Racing car into his garage with a misfiring engine and later retired. Nick Tandy got past Antonio García's No. 3 Corvette but clipped the curb at the Bus Stop chicane too hard and speared into the tire barrier after losing control of his vehicle's rear leaving the turn. He returned to the pit lane with heavy car damage. As it turned January 28, Nasr's right-rear tire failed but had minimal car damage and went to the pit lane for a replacement wheel. The lead of GTD went to Adam Christodoulou's No. 33 Riley Mercedes-AMG because IMSA deemed that Jeffrey Schmidt's No. 29 Land Audi had exceeded the maximum rate of permitted fuel flow (a balance of performance transgression) at the car's pit stops. IMSA ordered the team to serve a five-minute stop-and-hold penalty. The race's second full course yellow was activated for 18 minutes when Roberto González was on his out-lap on cold tires and went straight into the tire barrier at the third corner. Mustang Sampling Racing changed the brake discs on the No. 5 car during the caution, allowing Ricky Taylor and Pagenaud into first and second overall.

In GTD, Katherine Legge took over the class lead in the No. 86 MSR Acura NSX when the No. 33 Riley Mercedes-AMG served a stop-and-hold penalty for speeding in the pit lane. Legge lost it soon after to Perera's No. 48 PSR Lamborghini and Brekers took second place in the class for Grasser. Meanwhile, the top four overall cars were separated by six seconds and three cars were contesting the battle for second place. Barbosa sidedrafted Pagenaud with fourth-placed Nasr slipstreaming both cars on the approach to the Bus Stop chicane. Nasr out-braked both vehicles and passed them for second overall. Graham Rahal was now in the No.7 Penske Acura but was overtaken by Barbosa and Nasr. Ten hours and 30 minutes in, Alonso drove No. 23 United Autosports car into the garage with a master brake cylinder failure and fell out of contention for a top ten finish. One second separated Barbosa, Nasr and Rahal with Pagenaud drawing slightly closer in fourth. Nasr lost second to Rahal in the 11th hour. Pagenaud took the lead for a short time during the pit stops for fuel. Rahal extended his lead as Barbosa and Nasr lost time on cold tires, but Pagenaud gained first when Rahal spun and stalled at turn one.

=== Morning ===
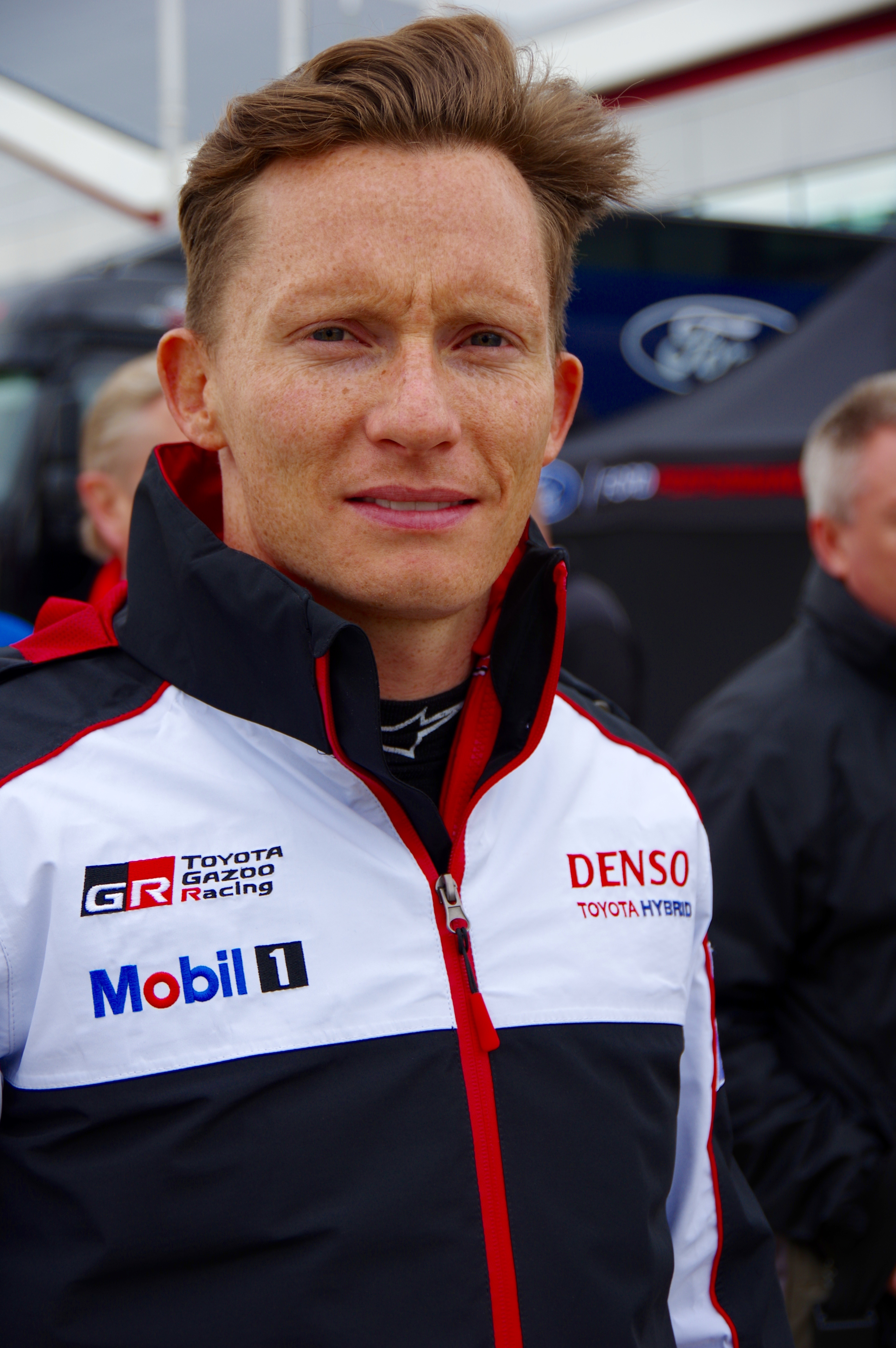
Mike Conway (pictured in 2016) of Whelen Engineering Racing was called to pit road for cooling issues in the 18th hour.

Conway regained first place through the next pit stop cycle. Tung slid the No. 78 Jackie Chan Oreca at the Bus Stop chicane and rear-ended the inside tire barrier. He made a pit stop for a replacement rear wing assembly and repairs to the car's front-left bodywork. The two Nissan DPis of ESM driven by Ryan Dalziel and Derani retired by hour 14 because of respective terminal gearbox and engine failures. Cameron led for three laps before his mechanics called him to pit road to inspect the No. 6 Penske car thoroughly for a suspected alternator problem that drained its battery. Cameron lost 24 laps to the leaders while the alternator was changed, and just three entries in the Prototype category remained on the lead lap. Curran led at the beginning of the 15th hour but lost it to teammate Albuquerque when his rear brake light failed to work. A rear wing replacement was mandated at his unscheduled pit stop as he fell off the lead lap. In the 16th hour's opening minutes, the third full course yellow flags were waved for 20 minutes. Jörg Bergmeister in the No. 73 Park Place Porsche had lightly hit the tire wall alongside the circuit and continued to the pit lane. Several cars in GTD took the opportunity to change brake discs during the caution.

14 minutes after racing resumed, Castroneves and Nasr made contact at the first infield hairpin, resulting in significant damage to the No. 7 Penske's left-hand side intercooler, radiator and bodywork, necessitating its return to the garage. It returned 25 laps adrift of the leader and out of contention for the overall win. Van der Zande's No. 10 WTR Cadillac sustained another right-rear puncture, this time at high speed. WTR owner Wayne Taylor retired the car for driver safety reasons, uncertain of the cause of the problem, and he wanted to stop using spare bodywork parts. Soon after, Bomarito's No. 55 Mazda retired at the West Horseshoe due to an exhaust problem that caused a car fire. The fourth (and final) full course yellow was activated for 22 minutes when Kyle Masson put Legge off the track; he ploughed through an advertising billboard and Styrofoam blocks, littering debris on the circuit. Legge narrowly avoided impacting Masson's side. Under caution, Fittipaldi brought the No. 5 vehicle onto pit road to rectify an overnight cooling issue by removing the engine cover and adding water. This allowed Conway back on the lead lap. Mustang Sampling also switched off their car's engine during pit stops to limit rising temperatures while the sister WER team had a less severe temperature issue.

Conway stayed close by Fittipaldi as Braun got the No. 54 CORE car past the latter to regain one of its laps. Conway could not pass his teammate to regain first overall. Midway through the 19th hour, Conway was called to pit road for a similar cooling issue that hindered the sister No. 5 car; he kept second because Paul di Resta's No. 32 United Autosports car had a clutch pressure problem that temporarily prevented him from leaving pit road. He lost three laps to Fittipaldi. The No. 11 Grasser Lamborghini took the lead in GTD after trading the position with the No. 33 Riley Mercedes-AMG for the past few hours. Meanwhile, teams scheduled their final pit stops and prepared their fastest drivers for their last stints. The leaders of two of the three categories were close by each other without over risking. Overheating concerns slowed Nasr and fell to third behind Loïc Duval's No. 54 CORE car. Nasr retook second when Duval made a scheduled pit stop by the end of hour 22.

=== Finish ===
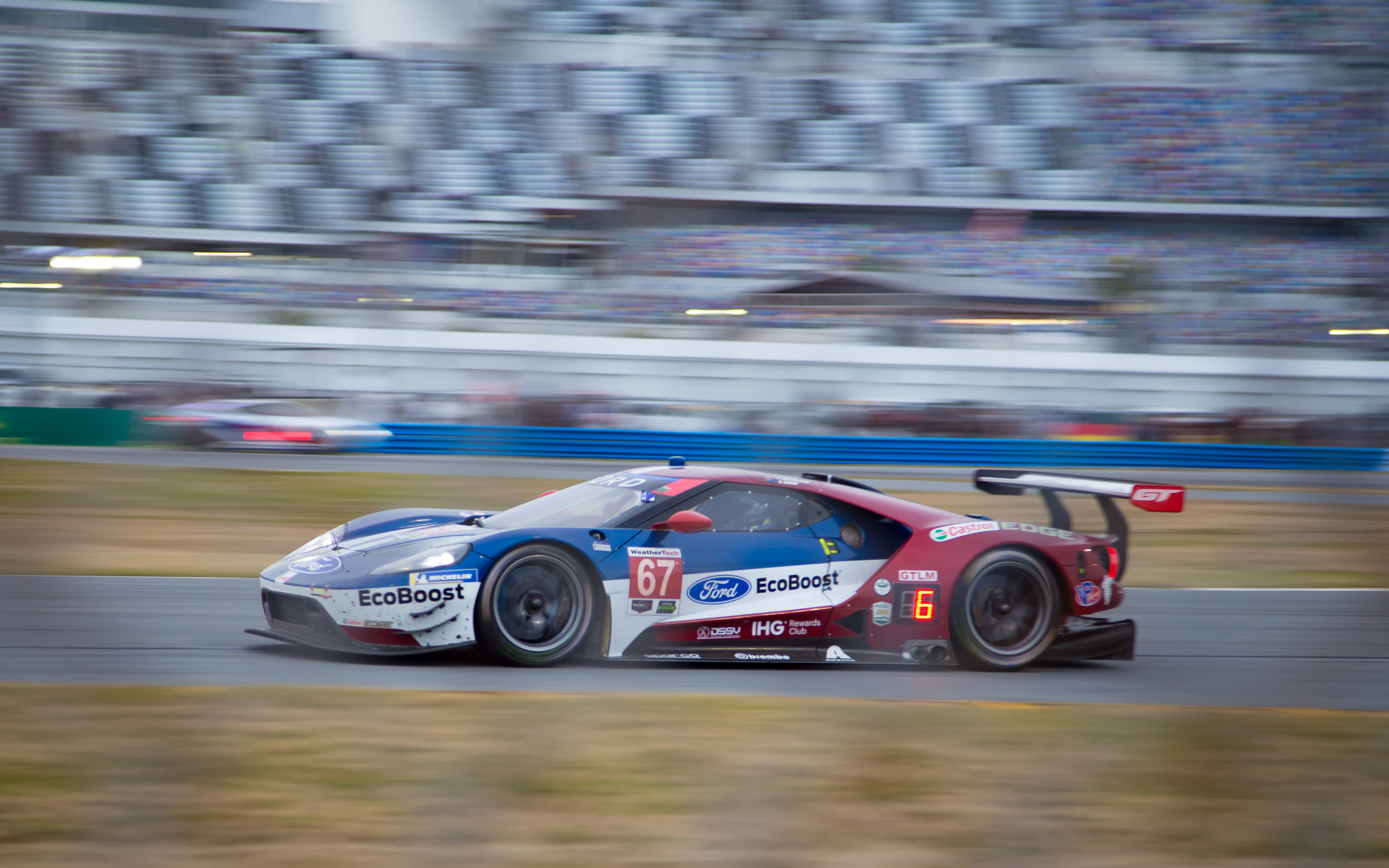
The No. 67 Ford took the win in the GTLM class.

Unhindered after relieving Fittipaldi in the final two hours by nursing the overheating car, Albuquerque took the chequered flag for Mustang Sampling Racing in a record-breaking distance of 808 laps and 2,876.48 miles (4,629.25 km), overtaking the record set by John Paul Jr., John Paul Sr. and Rolf Stommelen in a Porsche 935 at the 1982 race. It was Barbosa and Fittipaldi's third outright victory at Daytona and Albuquerque's first. Middleton's No. 31 WER car followed 1 minute and 10.544 seconds later in second, and Braun's No. 54 CORE Oreca was the highest-placed LMP2 vehicle in third following the high rate of attrition. In GTLM, the No. 67 Ford of Briscoe, Dixon and Westbrook passed the sister No. 66 Ford of Hand, Dirk Müller and Bourdais in its final pit stop since it required less fuel by running an alternate strategy earlier than its sister entry, achieving CGR's 200th motor racing victory and their second consecutive win, by 11.180 seconds after Ford led all but nine of 783 laps. It was Dixon's third Daytona victory, Briscoe's second, and Hand's first. The No. 3 Corvette of Garcia, Magnussen and Mike Rockenfeller completed the class podium two laps behind the Fords in third. Bleekemolen's No. 33 Riley Mercedes-AMG closed to within a second of Bortolotti's No. 11 GRT Lamborghini in the final half-hour. A pit stop for fuel for Bleekemolen with 15 minutes left allowed Bortolotti to claim victory in GTD and Lamborghini's maiden 24-hour race win. Parente got the No. 86 MSR Acura NSX to second and PSR's No. 23 Lamborghini took third with Andrea Caldarelli driving the final stint.

== Post-race ==
Continental Tire, one of IMSA's two tire suppliers, suggested the increased competition in the Prototype category, teams double stinting their tires (the same sets brought by the company to Daytona for the past five years), and running them outside of their recommended air pressures and camber settings, were factors in several cars sustaining right-rear punctures during practice and the race. Warm track temperatures, the highest in five years, led teams to lower tire air pressures to stop them from over-inflating once they reached their optimum running temperatures. Furthermore, according to Continental Tire, they cautioned three teams over not receiving more sets of tires because they had not brought their limits in line with the company's recommendations. One team reported to Continental Tire that their tire failures occurred after increasing their tire pressures to the company's prescribed limits. Regardless, at the 12 Hours of Sebring, Continental Tire debuted a more durable slick tire which allowed for more aggressive setups and enhanced the likelihood that incidents such as the multiple punctures seen at Daytona would not reoccur in the future.

The No. 29 Land Audi was impounded at technical inspection for three hours after the race. The team's refuelling equipment was deemed to comply with IMSA regulations, but a discrepancy in the fuel data provided to the series and the team was discovered. Starting at Sebring, IMSA established minimum refuelling times for all classes, overriding all refuelling restrictor starting sizes issued to teams. This was listed in the category-wide balance of performance tables to counter the controversy. Jarvis expressed his surprise that the race had just four caution periods compared to 21 in 2017, "We always talk about Daytona as [being about] staying out of trouble, staying on the lead lap – and if you do have a problem, don't worry, because you get laps back. But it just hasn't happened. I've never seen a Daytona 24 with such big gaps [between the leading cars]. It's a shame really because in the prototype class there hasn't been much of a race on, it's just survival to the finish." Duval said the low number of cautions lessened his team's chances of the overall victory, because the day before it began they anticipated more than 20, adding: "We tried to put some pressure on the guys [ahead] but it was a bit too late, they were a bit too far ahead."

Since it was the season's first race, Albuquerue, Barbosa and Fittipaldi led the Prototype Drivers' Championship with 35 points each. Conway, Curran, Middleton and Nasr were in second with 32 points. Jon Bennett, Braun, Dumas and Duval were third with 30 points. Westbrook, Dixon and Briscoe took the GTLM points standings lead with their teammates Bourdais, Hand and Müller placing second. Garcia, Magnussen and Rockenfeller rounded out the top three. Bortolotti, Perera, Rik Breukers and Inechen led the GTD Drivers' Championship, followed by the second-placed Allmendinger, Parente, Legge and Hindman. Caldarelli, Sellers, Miller and Snow were third. Mustang Sampling Racing, CGR and GRT Grasser Racing Team became the leaders of their respective class Teams' Championships. Cadillac, Ford and Lamborghini assumed the lead of their respective Manufacturers' Championships with 11 races left in the season.

== Results ==
Class winners are denoted in bold. P stands for Daytona Prototype International, GTLM (Grand Touring Le Mans) and GTD (Grand Touring Daytona).

Final race classification
Pos	Class	No.	Team	Drivers	Chassis	Tire	Laps	Time/Retired
Pos	Class	No.	Team	Drivers	Engine	Tire	Laps	Time/Retired
1	**P**	**5**	**(United States) Mustang Sampling Racing**	**(Portugal) Filipe Albuquerque (Portugal) João Barbosa (Brazil) Christian Fittipaldi**	**Cadillac DPi-V.R**	C	**808**	**24:01:32.128**
1	**P**	**5**	**(United States) Mustang Sampling Racing**	**(Portugal) Filipe Albuquerque (Portugal) João Barbosa (Brazil) Christian Fittipaldi**	**Cadillac 5.5 L V8**	C	**808**	**24:01:32.128**
2	P	31	(United States) Whelen Engineering Racing	(United Kingdom) Mike Conway (United States) Eric Curran (United Kingdom) Stuart Middleton (Brazil) Felipe Nasr	Cadillac DPi-V.R	C	808	+1:10.544
2	P	31	(United States) Whelen Engineering Racing	(United Kingdom) Mike Conway (United States) Eric Curran (United Kingdom) Stuart Middleton (Brazil) Felipe Nasr	Cadillac 5.5 L V8	C	808	+1:10.544
3	P	54	(United States) CORE Autosport	(United States) Jon Bennett (United States) Colin Braun (France) Romain Dumas (France) Loïc Duval	Oreca 07	C	808	+1:31.982
3	P	54	(United States) CORE Autosport	(United States) Jon Bennett (United States) Colin Braun (France) Romain Dumas (France) Loïc Duval	Gibson GK428 4.2 L V8	C	808	+1:31.982
4	P	32	(United States) United Autosports	(United States) Will Owen (United Kingdom) Paul di Resta (Switzerland) Hugo de Sadeleer (Brazil) Bruno Senna	Ligier JS P217	C	804	+4 Laps
4	P	32	(United States) United Autosports	(United States) Will Owen (United Kingdom) Paul di Resta (Switzerland) Hugo de Sadeleer (Brazil) Bruno Senna	Gibson GK428 4.2 L V8	C	804	+4 Laps
5	P	78	(China) Jackie Chan DCR JOTA	(United Kingdom) Alex Brundle (Portugal) António Félix da Costa (Austria) Ferdinand Habsburg-Lothringen (China) Ho-Pin Tung	Oreca 07	C	804	+4 Laps
5	P	78	(China) Jackie Chan DCR JOTA	(United Kingdom) Alex Brundle (Portugal) António Félix da Costa (Austria) Ferdinand Habsburg-Lothringen (China) Ho-Pin Tung	Gibson GK428 4.2 L V8	C	804	+4 Laps
6	P	85	(United States) JDC–Miller MotorSports	(United States) Robert Alon (United States) Austin Cindric (Canada) Devlin DeFrancesco (Switzerland) Simon Trummer	Oreca 07	C	798	+10 Laps
6	P	85	(United States) JDC–Miller MotorSports	(United States) Robert Alon (United States) Austin Cindric (Canada) Devlin DeFrancesco (Switzerland) Simon Trummer	Gibson GK428 4.2 L V8	C	798	+10 Laps
7	P	99	(United States) JDC–Miller MotorSports	(Canada) Misha Goikhberg (United States) Gustavo Menezes (United States) Chris Miller (South Africa) Stephen Simpson	Oreca 07	C	798	+10 Laps
7	P	99	(United States) JDC–Miller MotorSports	(Canada) Misha Goikhberg (United States) Gustavo Menezes (United States) Chris Miller (South Africa) Stephen Simpson	Gibson GK428 4.2 L V8	C	798	+10 Laps
8	P	38	(United States) Performance Tech Motorsports	(United States) James French (United States) Kyle Masson (United States) Joel Miller (Mexico) Patricio O'Ward	Oreca 07	C	796	+12 Laps
8	P	38	(United States) Performance Tech Motorsports	(United States) James French (United States) Kyle Masson (United States) Joel Miller (Mexico) Patricio O'Ward	Gibson GK428 4.2 L V8	C	796	+12 Laps
9	P	7	(United States) Acura Team Penske	(Brazil) Hélio Castroneves (United States) Graham Rahal (United States) Ricky Taylor	Acura ARX-05	C	793	+15 Laps
9	P	7	(United States) Acura Team Penske	(Brazil) Hélio Castroneves (United States) Graham Rahal (United States) Ricky Taylor	Acura AR35TT 3.5 L Turbo V6	C	793	+15 Laps
10	P	6	(United States) Acura Team Penske	(United States) Dane Cameron (Colombia) Juan Pablo Montoya (France) Simon Pagenaud	Acura ARX-05	C	793	+15 Laps
10	P	6	(United States) Acura Team Penske	(United States) Dane Cameron (Colombia) Juan Pablo Montoya (France) Simon Pagenaud	Acura AR35TT 3.5 L Turbo V6	C	793	+15 Laps
11	**GTLM**	**67**	**(United States) Ford Chip Ganassi Racing**	**(Australia) Ryan Briscoe (New Zealand) Scott Dixon (United Kingdom) Richard Westbrook**	**Ford GT**	M	**783**	**+25 Laps**
11	**GTLM**	**67**	**(United States) Ford Chip Ganassi Racing**	**(Australia) Ryan Briscoe (New Zealand) Scott Dixon (United Kingdom) Richard Westbrook**	**Ford EcoBoost 3.5 L Turbo V6**	M	**783**	**+25 Laps**
12	GTLM	66	(United States) Ford Chip Ganassi Racing	(France) Sébastien Bourdais (United States) Joey Hand (Germany) Dirk Müller	Ford GT	M	783	+25 Laps
12	GTLM	66	(United States) Ford Chip Ganassi Racing	(France) Sébastien Bourdais (United States) Joey Hand (Germany) Dirk Müller	Ford EcoBoost 3.5 L Turbo V6	M	783	+25 Laps
13	GTLM	3	(United States) Corvette Racing	(Spain) Antonio García (Denmark) Jan Magnussen (Germany) Mike Rockenfeller	Chevrolet Corvette C7.R	M	781	+27 Laps
13	GTLM	3	(United States) Corvette Racing	(Spain) Antonio García (Denmark) Jan Magnussen (Germany) Mike Rockenfeller	Chevrolet LT5.5 5.5 L V8	M	781	+27 Laps
14	GTLM	4	(United States) Corvette Racing	(Switzerland) Marcel Fässler (United Kingdom) Oliver Gavin (United States) Tommy Milner	Chevrolet Corvette C7.R	M	780	+28 Laps
14	GTLM	4	(United States) Corvette Racing	(Switzerland) Marcel Fässler (United Kingdom) Oliver Gavin (United States) Tommy Milner	Chevrolet LT5.5 5.5 L V8	M	780	+28 Laps
15	P	37	(China) Jackie Chan DCR JOTA	(Netherlands) Robin Frijns (Spain) Daniel Juncadella (Sweden) Felix Rosenqvist (Canada) Lance Stroll	Oreca 07	C	777	+31 Laps
15	P	37	(China) Jackie Chan DCR JOTA	(Netherlands) Robin Frijns (Spain) Daniel Juncadella (Sweden) Felix Rosenqvist (Canada) Lance Stroll	Gibson GK428 4.2 L V8	C	777	+31 Laps
16	GTLM	62	(United States) Risi Competizione	(United Kingdom) James Calado (Italy) Alessandro Pier Guidi (Italy) Davide Rigon (Finland) Toni Vilander	Ferrari 488 GTE	M	774	+34 Laps
16	GTLM	62	(United States) Risi Competizione	(United Kingdom) James Calado (Italy) Alessandro Pier Guidi (Italy) Davide Rigon (Finland) Toni Vilander	Ferrari F154CB 3.9 L Turbo V8	M	774	+34 Laps
17	GTLM	912	(United States) Porsche GT Team	(New Zealand) Earl Bamber (Italy) Gianmaria Bruni (Belgium) Laurens Vanthoor	Porsche 911 RSR	M	774	+34 Laps
17	GTLM	912	(United States) Porsche GT Team	(New Zealand) Earl Bamber (Italy) Gianmaria Bruni (Belgium) Laurens Vanthoor	Porsche 4.0 L Flat-6	M	774	+34 Laps
18	GTLM	24	(United States) BMW Team RLL	(Netherlands) Nick Catsburg (United States) John Edwards (Brazil) Augusto Farfus (Finland) Jesse Krohn	BMW M8 GTE	M	773	+35 Laps
18	GTLM	24	(United States) BMW Team RLL	(Netherlands) Nick Catsburg (United States) John Edwards (Brazil) Augusto Farfus (Finland) Jesse Krohn	BMW S63 4.0 L Twin-turbo V8	M	773	+35 Laps
19	P	52	(United States) AFS/PR1 Mathiasen Motorsports	(United States) Nick Boulle (Mexico) Roberto González (Colombia) Sebastián Saavedra (Colombia) Gustavo Yacamán	Ligier JS P217	C	771	+37 Laps
19	P	52	(United States) AFS/PR1 Mathiasen Motorsports	(United States) Nick Boulle (Mexico) Roberto González (Colombia) Sebastián Saavedra (Colombia) Gustavo Yacamán	Gibson GK428 4.2 L V8	C	771	+37 Laps
20	GTLM	911	(United States) Porsche GT Team	(France) Frédéric Makowiecki (France) Patrick Pilet (United Kingdom) Nick Tandy	Porsche 911 RSR	M	753	+55 Laps
20	GTLM	911	(United States) Porsche GT Team	(France) Frédéric Makowiecki (France) Patrick Pilet (United Kingdom) Nick Tandy	Porsche 4.0 L Flat-6	M	753	+55 Laps
21	**GTD**	**11**	**(Austria) GRT Grasser Racing Team**	**(Italy) Mirko Bortolotti (Netherlands) Rik Breukers (Switzerland) Rolf Ineichen (France) Franck Perera**	**Lamborghini Huracán GT3**	C	**752**	**+56 Laps**
21	**GTD**	**11**	**(Austria) GRT Grasser Racing Team**	**(Italy) Mirko Bortolotti (Netherlands) Rik Breukers (Switzerland) Rolf Ineichen (France) Franck Perera**	**Lamborghini 5.2 L V10**	C	**752**	**+56 Laps**
22	GTD	86	(United States) Michael Shank Racing with Curb-Agajanian	(United States) A. J. Allmendinger (United States) Trent Hindman (United Kingdom) Katherine Legge (Portugal) Álvaro Parente	Acura NSX GT3	C	751	+57 Laps
22	GTD	86	(United States) Michael Shank Racing with Curb-Agajanian	(United States) A. J. Allmendinger (United States) Trent Hindman (United Kingdom) Katherine Legge (Portugal) Álvaro Parente	Acura 3.5 L Turbo V6	C	751	+57 Laps
23	GTD	48	(United States) Paul Miller Racing	(Italy) Andrea Caldarelli (United States) Bryce Miller (United States) Bryan Sellers (United States) Madison Snow	Lamborghini Huracán GT3	C	751	+57 Laps
23	GTD	48	(United States) Paul Miller Racing	(Italy) Andrea Caldarelli (United States) Bryce Miller (United States) Bryan Sellers (United States) Madison Snow	Lamborghini 5.2 L V10	C	751	+57 Laps
24	GTD	33	(United States) Mercedes-AMG Team Riley Motorsports	(Netherlands) Jeroen Bleekemolen (United Kingdom) Adam Christodoulou (United States) Ben Keating (Germany) Luca Stolz	Mercedes-AMG GT3	C	751	+57 Laps
24	GTD	33	(United States) Mercedes-AMG Team Riley Motorsports	(Netherlands) Jeroen Bleekemolen (United Kingdom) Adam Christodoulou (United States) Ben Keating (Germany) Luca Stolz	Mercedes-AMG M159 6.2 L V8	C	751	+57 Laps
25	GTD	64	(United States) Scuderia Corsa	(United States) Townsend Bell (United Kingdom) Sam Bird (United States) Frankie Montecalvo (United States) Bill Sweedler	Ferrari 488 GT3	C	751	+57 Laps
25	GTD	64	(United States) Scuderia Corsa	(United States) Townsend Bell (United Kingdom) Sam Bird (United States) Frankie Montecalvo (United States) Bill Sweedler	Ferrari F154CB 3.9 L Turbo V8	C	751	+57 Laps
26	GTD	44	(United States) Magnus Racing	(United States) Andrew Davis (United States) Andy Lally (United States) John Potter (Germany) Markus Winkelhock	Audi R8 LMS	C	750	+58 Laps
26	GTD	44	(United States) Magnus Racing	(United States) Andrew Davis (United States) Andy Lally (United States) John Potter (Germany) Markus Winkelhock	Audi 5.2 L V10	C	750	+58 Laps
27	GTD	29	(Germany) Montaplast by Land-Motorsport	(South Africa) Sheldon van der Linde (South Africa) Kelvin van der Linde (Germany) Christopher Mies (Switzerland) Jeffrey Schmidt	Audi R8 LMS	C	749	+59 Laps
27	GTD	29	(Germany) Montaplast by Land-Motorsport	(South Africa) Sheldon van der Linde (South Africa) Kelvin van der Linde (Germany) Christopher Mies (Switzerland) Jeffrey Schmidt	Audi 5.2 L V10	C	749	+59 Laps
28	GTD	75	(United States) SunEnergy1 Racing	(Canada) Mikaël Grenier (Australia) Kenny Habul (Germany) Thomas Jäger (Germany) Maro Engel	Mercedes-AMG GT3	C	745	+63 Laps
28	GTD	75	(United States) SunEnergy1 Racing	(Canada) Mikaël Grenier (Australia) Kenny Habul (Germany) Thomas Jäger (Germany) Maro Engel	Mercedes-AMG M159 6.2 L V8	C	745	+63 Laps
29	GTD	15	(United States) 3GT Racing	(Germany) Dominik Farnbacher (United Kingdom) Jack Hawksworth (Denmark) David Heinemeier Hansson (United States) Scott Pruett	Lexus RC F GT3	C	744	+64 Laps
29	GTD	15	(United States) 3GT Racing	(Germany) Dominik Farnbacher (United Kingdom) Jack Hawksworth (Denmark) David Heinemeier Hansson (United States) Scott Pruett	Lexus 5.0 L V8	C	744	+64 Laps
30	GTD	63	(United States) Scuderia Corsa	(Italy) Alessandro Balzan (United States) Gunnar Jeannette (United States) Cooper MacNeil (United States) Jeff Segal	Ferrari 488 GT3	C	744	+64 Laps
30	GTD	63	(United States) Scuderia Corsa	(Italy) Alessandro Balzan (United States) Gunnar Jeannette (United States) Cooper MacNeil (United States) Jeff Segal	Ferrari F154CB 3.9 L Turbo V8	C	744	+64 Laps
31	GTD	93	(United States) Michael Shank Racing with Curb-Agajanian	(United States) Lawson Aschenbach (Germany) Mario Farnbacher (France) Côme Ledogar (United States) Justin Marks	Acura NSX GT3	C	741	+67 Laps
31	GTD	93	(United States) Michael Shank Racing with Curb-Agajanian	(United States) Lawson Aschenbach (Germany) Mario Farnbacher (France) Côme Ledogar (United States) Justin Marks	Acura 3.5 L Turbo V6	C	741	+67 Laps
32	GTD	71	(United States) P1 Motorsports	(United States) Robby Foley (United States) Kenton Koch (Colombia) JC Perez (Italy) Loris Spinelli	Mercedes-AMG GT3	C	741	+67 Laps
32	GTD	71	(United States) P1 Motorsports	(United States) Robby Foley (United States) Kenton Koch (Colombia) JC Perez (Italy) Loris Spinelli	Mercedes-AMG M159 6.2 L V8	C	741	+67 Laps
33	GTD	19	(Austria) GRT Grasser Racing Team	(Germany) Christian Engelhart (Switzerland) Christoph Lenz (Belgium) Louis Machiels (Argentina) Ezequiel Pérez Companc (Netherlands) Max van Splunteren	Lamborghini Huracán GT3	C	739	+69 Laps
33	GTD	19	(Austria) GRT Grasser Racing Team	(Germany) Christian Engelhart (Switzerland) Christoph Lenz (Belgium) Louis Machiels (Argentina) Ezequiel Pérez Companc (Netherlands) Max van Splunteren	Lamborghini 5.2 L V10	C	739	+69 Laps
34	GTD	96	(United States) Turner Motorsport	(Germany) Jens Klingmann (United States) Mark Kvamme (United States) Cameron Lawrence (Germany) Martin Tomczyk (United States) Don Yount	BMW M6 GT3	C	733	+75 Laps
34	GTD	96	(United States) Turner Motorsport	(Germany) Jens Klingmann (United States) Mark Kvamme (United States) Cameron Lawrence (Germany) Martin Tomczyk (United States) Don Yount	BMW 4.4 L Turbo V8	C	733	+75 Laps
35	GTLM	25	(United States) BMW Team RLL	(United States) Bill Auberlen (United States) Connor De Phillippi (Austria) Philipp Eng (United Kingdom) Alexander Sims	BMW M8 GTE	M	731	+77 Laps
35	GTLM	25	(United States) BMW Team RLL	(United States) Bill Auberlen (United States) Connor De Phillippi (Austria) Philipp Eng (United Kingdom) Alexander Sims	BMW S63 4.0 L Twin-turbo V8	M	731	+77 Laps
36	GTD	14	(United States) 3GT Racing	(Austria) Dominik Baumann (Switzerland) Philipp Frommenwiler (Brazil) Bruno Junqueira (Canada) Kyle Marcelli	Lexus RC F GT3	C	719	+89 Laps
36	GTD	14	(United States) 3GT Racing	(Austria) Dominik Baumann (Switzerland) Philipp Frommenwiler (Brazil) Bruno Junqueira (Canada) Kyle Marcelli	Lexus 5.0 L V8	C	719	+89 Laps
37	GTD	69	(United States) HART	(United States) Ryan Eversley (United States) John Falb (United States) Chad Gilsinger (United States) Sean Rayhall	Acura NSX GT3	C	719	+89 Laps
37	GTD	69	(United States) HART	(United States) Ryan Eversley (United States) John Falb (United States) Chad Gilsinger (United States) Sean Rayhall	Acura 3.5 L Turbo V6	C	719	+89 Laps
38	P	23	(United States) United Autosports	(Spain) Fernando Alonso (United Kingdom) Phil Hanson (United Kingdom) Lando Norris	Ligier JS P217	C	718	+90 Laps
38	P	23	(United States) United Autosports	(Spain) Fernando Alonso (United Kingdom) Phil Hanson (United Kingdom) Lando Norris	Gibson GK428 4.2 L V8	C	718	+90 Laps
39	GTD	82	(United States) Risi Competizione	(Mexico) Santiago Creel (Mexico) Martin Fuentes (Republic of Ireland) Matt Griffin (Spain) Miguel Molina (Mexico) Ricardo Pérez de Lara	Ferrari 488 GT3	C	715	+93 Laps
39	GTD	82	(United States) Risi Competizione	(Mexico) Santiago Creel (Mexico) Martin Fuentes (Republic of Ireland) Matt Griffin (Spain) Miguel Molina (Mexico) Ricardo Pérez de Lara	Ferrari F154CB 3.9 L Turbo V8	C	715	+93 Laps
40	GTD	73	(United States) Park Place Motorsports	(Germany) Jörg Bergmeister (United States) Patrick Lindsey (United States) Tim Pappas (Austria) Norbert Siedler	Porsche 911 GT3 R	C	675	+133 Laps
40	GTD	73	(United States) Park Place Motorsports	(Germany) Jörg Bergmeister (United States) Patrick Lindsey (United States) Tim Pappas (Austria) Norbert Siedler	Porsche 4.0 L Flat-6	C	675	+133 Laps
41	GTD	58	(United States) Wright Motorsports	(France) Mathieu Jaminet (United States) Patrick Long (Denmark) Christina Nielsen (Germany) Robert Renauer	Porsche 911 GT3 R	C	666	+142 Laps
41	GTD	58	(United States) Wright Motorsports	(France) Mathieu Jaminet (United States) Patrick Long (Denmark) Christina Nielsen (Germany) Robert Renauer	Porsche 4.0 L Flat-6	C	666	+142 Laps
42	P	20	(United States) BAR1 Motorsports (Note: Tomy Drissi was listed at the beginning before he withdrew for business commitments.)	(United States) Marc Drumwright (United States) Brendan Gaughan (United States) Eric Lux (Venezuela) Alex Popow	Riley Mk. 30	C	642	+166 Laps
42	P	20	(United States) BAR1 Motorsports	(United States) Marc Drumwright (United States) Brendan Gaughan (United States) Eric Lux (Venezuela) Alex Popow	Gibson GK428 4.2 L V8	C	642	+166 Laps
43 DNF	GTD	59	(Germany) Manthey Racing	(Italy) Matteo Cairoli (Germany) Sven Müller (Austria) Harald Proczyk (Germany) Steve Smith (Germany) Randy Walls	Porsche 911 GT3 R	C	637	Mechanical
43 DNF	GTD	59	(Germany) Manthey Racing	(Italy) Matteo Cairoli (Germany) Sven Müller (Austria) Harald Proczyk (Germany) Steve Smith (Germany) Randy Walls	Porsche 4.0 L Flat-6	C	637	Mechanical
44	GTD	51	(Switzerland) Spirit of Race	(Canada) Paul Dalla Lana (Portugal) Pedro Lamy (Austria) Mathias Lauda (Brazil) Daniel Serra	Ferrari 488 GT3	C	571	+237 Laps
44	GTD	51	(Switzerland) Spirit of Race	(Canada) Paul Dalla Lana (Portugal) Pedro Lamy (Austria) Mathias Lauda (Brazil) Daniel Serra	Ferrari F154CB 3.9 L Turbo V8	C	571	+237 Laps
45 DNF	P	10	(United States) Wayne Taylor Racing	(United States) Ryan Hunter-Reay (United States) Jordan Taylor (Netherlands) Renger van der Zande	Cadillac DPi-V.R	C	555	Withdrew
45 DNF	P	10	(United States) Wayne Taylor Racing	(United States) Ryan Hunter-Reay (United States) Jordan Taylor (Netherlands) Renger van der Zande	Cadillac 5.5 L V8	C	555	Withdrew
46 DNF	P	55	(Germany) Mazda Team Joest	(United States) Jonathan Bomarito (United States) Spencer Pigot (United Kingdom) Harry Tincknell	Mazda RT24-P	C	541	Engine fire
46 DNF	P	55	(Germany) Mazda Team Joest	(United States) Jonathan Bomarito (United States) Spencer Pigot (United Kingdom) Harry Tincknell	Mazda MZ-2.0T 2.0 L Turbo I4	C	541	Engine fire
47 DNF	P	77	(Germany) Mazda Team Joest	(United Kingdom) Oliver Jarvis (United States) Tristan Nunez (Germany) René Rast	Mazda RT24-P	C	530	Engine
47 DNF	P	77	(Germany) Mazda Team Joest	(United Kingdom) Oliver Jarvis (United States) Tristan Nunez (Germany) René Rast	Mazda MZ-2.0T 2.0 L Turbo I4	C	530	Engine
48 DNF	P	22	(United States) Tequila Patrón ESM	(Brazil) Pipo Derani (France) Nicolas Lapierre (United States) Johannes van Overbeek	Nissan Onroak DPi	C	438	Engine
48 DNF	P	22	(United States) Tequila Patrón ESM	(Brazil) Pipo Derani (France) Nicolas Lapierre (United States) Johannes van Overbeek	Nissan VR38DETT 3.8 L Turbo V6	C	438	Engine
49 DNF	P	2	(United States) Tequila Patrón ESM	(United Kingdom) Ryan Dalziel (France) Olivier Pla (United States) Scott Sharp	Nissan Onroak DPi	C	338	Engine
49 DNF	P	2	(United States) Tequila Patrón ESM	(United Kingdom) Ryan Dalziel (France) Olivier Pla (United States) Scott Sharp	Nissan VR38DETT 3.8 L Turbo V6	C	338	Engine
50 DNF	P	90	(United States) Spirit of Daytona Racing	(Italy) Eddie Cheever III (United States) Matt McMurry (France) Tristan Vautier	Cadillac DPi-V.R	C	291	Engine
50 DNF	P	90	(United States) Spirit of Daytona Racing	(Italy) Eddie Cheever III (United States) Matt McMurry (France) Tristan Vautier	Cadillac 5.5 L V8	C	291	Engine

Tire manufacturers
Key
Symbol	Tire manufacturer
**C**	Continental
**M**	Michelin

== Standings after the race ==
Prototype Drivers' Championship standings
Pos.	Driver	Points
1	(Portugal) Filipe Albuquerque (Portugal) João Barbosa (Brazil) Christian Fittipaldi	35
2	(United Kingdom) Mike Conway (United States) Eric Curran (United Kingdom) Stuart Middleton (Brazil) Felipe Nasr	32 (−3)
3	(United States) Jon Bennett (United States) Colin Braun (France) Romain Dumas (France) Loïc Duval	30 (−5)
4	(United Kingdom) Paul di Resta (United States) Will Owen (Switzerland) Hugo de Sadeleer (Brazil) Bruno Senna	28 (−7)
5	(United Kingdom) Alex Brundle (Portugal) António Félix da Costa (Austria) Ferdinand Habsburg-Lothringen (China) Ho-Pin Tung	26 (−9)

GTLM Drivers' Championship standings
Pos.	Driver	Points
1	(Australia) Ryan Briscoe (New Zealand) Scott Dixon (United Kingdom) Richard Westbrook	35
2	(France) Sébastien Bourdais (United States) Joey Hand (Germany) Dirk Müller	32 (−3)
3	(Spain) Antonio García (Denmark) Jan Magnussen (Germany) Mike Rockenfeller	30 (−5)
4	(Switzerland) Marcel Fässler (United Kingdom) Oliver Gavin (United States) Tommy Milner	28 (−7)
5	(United Kingdom) James Calado (Italy) Alessandro Pier Guidi (Italy) Davide Rigon (Finland) Toni Vilander	26 (−9)

GTD Drivers' Championship standings
Pos.	Driver	Points
1	(Italy) Mirko Bortolotti (Netherlands) Rik Breukers (Switzerland) Rolf Ineichen (France) Franck Perera	35
2	(United States) A. J. Allmendinger (United States) Trent Hindman (United Kingdom) Katherine Legge (Portugal) Álvaro Parente	32 (−3)
3	(Italy) Andrea Caldarelli (United States) Bryce Miller (United States) Bryan Sellers (United States) Madison Snow	30 (−5)
4	(Netherlands) Jeroen Bleekemolen (United Kingdom) Adam Christodoulou (United States) Ben Keating (Germany) Luca Stolz	28 (−7)
5	(United States) Townsend Bell (United Kingdom) Sam Bird (United States) Frankie Montecalvo (United States) Bill Sweedler	26 (−9)

- Note: Only the top five positions are included for all sets of standings.

Prototype Teams' Championship standings
Pos.	Team	Points
1	(United States) No. 5 Mustang Sampling Racing	35
2	(United States) No. 31 Whelen Engineering Racing	32 (−3)
3	(United States) No. 54 CORE Autosport	30 (−5)
4	(United States) No. 32 United Autosports	28 (−7)
5	(China) No. 78 Jackie Chan DCR JOTA	26 (−9)

GTLM Teams' Championship standings
Pos.	Team	Points
1	(United States) No. 67 Ford Chip Ganassi Racing	35
2	(United States) No. 66 Ford Chip Ganassi Racing	32 (−3)
3	(United States) No. 3 Corvette Racing	30 (−5)
4	(United States) No. 4 Corvette Racing	28 (−7)
5	(United States) No. 62 Risi Competizione	26 (−9)

GTD Teams' Championship standings
Pos.	Team	Points
1	(Austria) No. 11 GRT Grasser Racing Team	35
2	(United States) No. 86 Michael Shank Racing with Curb-Agajanian	32 (−3)
3	(United States) No. 48 Paul Miller Racing	30 (−5)
4	(United States) No. 33 Mercedes-AMG Team Riley Motorsports	28 (−7)
5	(United States) No. 64 Scuderia Corsa	26 (−9)

- Note: Only the top five positions are included for all sets of standings.

Prototype Manufacturers' Championship standings
Pos.	Manufacturer	Points
1	(United States) Cadillac	35
2	(United States) Acura	32 (−3)
3	(Japan) Mazda	30 (−5)
4	(Japan) Nissan	28 (−7)
5	(Germany) BMW	26 (−9)

GTLM Manufacturers' Championship standings
Pos.	Manufacturer	Points
1	(United States) Ford	35
2	(United States) Chevrolet	32 (−3)
3	(Italy) Ferrari	30 (−5)
4	(Germany) Porsche	28 (−7)
5	(Germany) BMW	26 (−9)

GTD Manufacturers' Championship standings
Pos.	Manufacturer	Points
1	(Italy) Lamborghini	35
2	(United States) Acura	32 (−3)
3	(Germany) Mercedes-AMG	30 (−5)
4	(Italy) Ferrari	28 (−7)
5	(Germany) Porsche	26 (−9)

- Note: Only the top five positions are included for all sets of standings.

WeatherTech SportsCar Championship
Previous race: Petit Le Mans (2017)	2018 season	Next race: 12 Hours of Sebring
