= JDC–Miller MotorSports =

Sports car racing team

(United States) JDC–Miller MotorSports
- Founded: 1994
- Base: Savage, Minnesota
- Team principal(s): John Church (CEO, Managing Partner); Gerry Kraut (Board Member); John Miller (Board Member); Chris Miller (Board Member); Katie Church (Board Member)
- Current series: WeatherTech SportsCar Championship; Michelin Pilot Challenge
- Former series: Star Mazda Championship; F2000 Championship
- Current drivers: IMSA SportsCar Championship: 85. (United States) Kaylen Frederick; (Netherlands) Tijmen van der Helm (Chile) Nico Pino (Germany) Laurin Heinrich
- Drivers' Championships: Star Mazda Championship: 2007: (United States) Dane Cameron; 2009: (United Kingdom) Adam Christodoulou; 2011: (France) Tristan Vautier; F2000 Championship: 2009: (United States) Chris Miller

JDC–Miller MotorSports is a sports car racing team that currently competes in the IMSA WeatherTech SportsCar Championship. The team currently fields the No. 85 Porsche 963 full-time for Tijmen van der Helm and Laurin Heinrich in the GTP class of the IMSA SportsCar Championship. JDC-Miller also runs the No. 17 Unitronic/Liqui Moly Porsche 718 Cayman GT4 RS Clubsport full-time for Chris Miller and Mikey Taylor in the GS class in the IMSA Michelin Pilot Challenge Series.

In June 2022, Porsche confirmed that JDC–Miller MotorSports would field a new Porsche 963 prototype race car as the first customer entry for the IMSA WeatherTech SportsCar Championship GTP class.

== History ==
The team was founded in 1994 by John Church and Gerry Kraut. The first major trophy was winning the 2007 Star Mazda Championship with American driver Dane Cameron. The performance was not repeated in 2008, when the American racing driver Joel Miller finished the season only on the 2nd place. JDC MotorSports won its second drivers' title in the 2009 season, when British racing driver Adam Christodoulou won the championship. Also in 2009, JDC MotorSports won the championship in the F2000 Championship Series through American racing driver Chris Miller. In 2011, Frenchman Tristan Vautier won the Star Mazda Championship, receiving a scholarship that later allowed him to advance in 2012 Indy Lights, in the Road to Indy program. The 2012 season brings another runner-up title in this competition through Colombian racing driver Gabby Chaves.

In 2014, the JDC-Miller MotorSports made its debut in the new competition, United SportsCar Championship, which resulted from the merger of Rolex Sports Car Series and American Le Mans Series. At the first participation in this competition, the best result was the 3rd place in the race from Road America to the Prototype Challenge class. The main race drivers this season were Chris Miller and Stephen Simpson. In the 2015 season, the team finished three times on the podium, in the race at The Raceway on Belle Isle they finished in 2nd place, and in the 24-hour races at Daytona and Canadian Tire Motorsport Park they finished in 3rd place. Races were Mikhail Goikhberg, Chris Miller, Rusty Mitchell and Stephen Simpson. In the third season of this competition, with the name change in the WeatherTech SportsCar Championship, the JDC-Miller MotorSports achieves its first major victories, winning the 24-hour race at Daytona and Long Beach Street Circuit, finishing at the end of the season in position third in the general classification with pilots Mikhail Goikhberg and Stephen Simpson in the 2016 Prototype Challenge class.

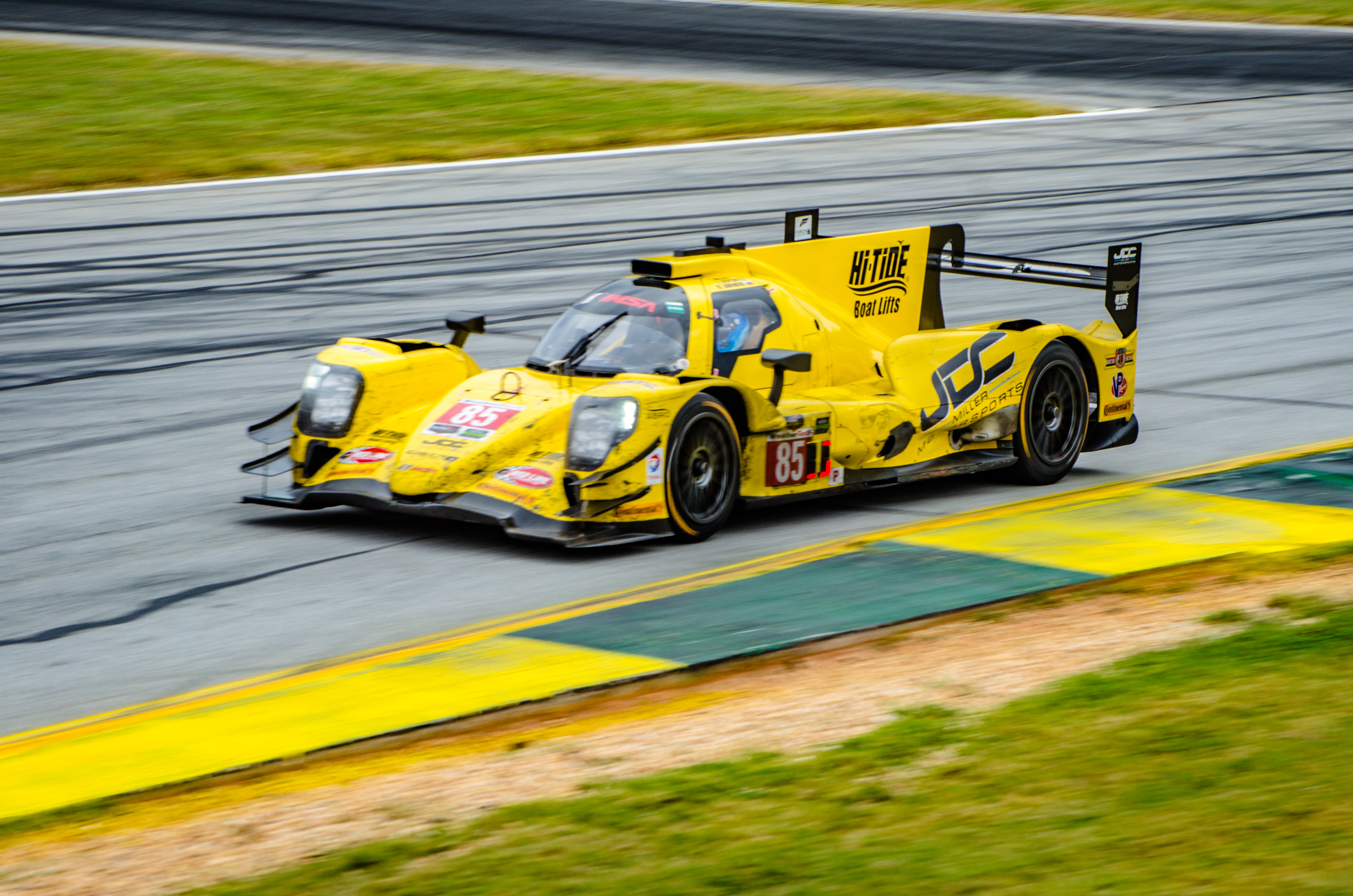
Oreca 07 of JDC-Miller Motorsports in 2017 Petit Le Mans at Road Atlanta

In the 2017 season, the team moved to the Prototype class, Mikhail Goikhberg and Stephen Simpson finished 2nd in Watkins Glen International and Canadian Tire Motorsport Park, finishing 4th overall. The 2018 season brings another premiere within the team, being the first time they line up two cars at the start. In the no. 85 car, the full season racing drivers were the American Robert Alon and the Swiss Simon Trummer, and in the no. 99 car were Mikhail Goikhberg and Stephen Simpson, the latter bringing the only victory of the season and the first in the Prototype class in round of the Watkins Glen International. 2019 was the most modest season for the team. Stephen Simpson and Simon Trummer in car number 84 and Mikhail Goikhberg and Tristan Vautier in car number 85 only had points in the 10 rounds of the season.

== Racing results ==
=== WeatherTech SportsCar Championship ===
Year	Class	Chassis	Engine	Drivers	No.	1	2	3	4	5	6	7	8	9	10	11	Pos.	Pts.
2014						DAY	SEB	LAG	KAN	WGI	IMS	ROA	VIR	COTA	ATL			
2014	PC	Oreca FLM09	Chevrolet LS3 6.2L V8	(United States) Chris Miller (9 races) (South Africa) Stephen Simpson (8 races)	85		4	6	10	6	7	3	7	7	6		6th	235
2015						DAY	SEB	LAG	DET	WGI	MOS	LIM	ROA	COTA	ATL			
2015	PC	Oreca FLM09	Chevrolet LS3 6.2L V8	(Canada) Mikhail Goikhberg	85	3	4	4	2	5	3	6	7	5	5		5th	285
2016						DAY	SEB	LBH	LAG	DET	WGI	MOS	LIM	ROA	COTA	ATL		
2016	PC	Oreca FLM09	Chevrolet LS3 6.2L V8	(Canada) Mikhail Goikhberg (South Africa) Stephen Simpson	85	1	4	1	5	7	4	5	6	7	6	3	4th	317
2017						DAY	SEB	LBH	COTA	DET	WGI	MOS	ROA	LAG	ATL			
2017	Prototype	Oreca 07	Gibson GK428 4.2 L V8	(Canada) Mikhail Goikhberg (South Africa) Stephen Simpson	85	5	4	4	4	6	2	2	8	4	6		4th	277
2018						DAY	SEB	LBH	MOH	DET	WGI	MOS	ROA	LAG	ATL			
2018	Prototype	Oreca 07	Gibson GK428 4.2 L V8	(United States) Robert Alon (Switzerland) Simon Trummer	85	6	9	13	12	10	8	8	12	7	9		11th	216
2018	Prototype	Oreca 07	Gibson GK428 4.2 L V8	(Canada) Mikhail Goikhberg (South Africa) Stephen Simpson	99	7	7	8	7	11	1	7	2	6	10		4th	252
2019						DAY	SEB	LBH	MOH	DET	WGI	MOS	ROA	LAG	ATL			
2019	DPi	Cadillac DPi-V.R	Cadillac 5.5 L V8	(South Africa) Stephen Simpson (Switzerland) Simon Trummer	84	10	8	5	7	4	9	8	9	9	5		8th	237
2019	DPi	Cadillac DPi-V.R	Cadillac 5.5 L V8	(Canada) Mikhail Goikhberg (France) Tristan Vautier	85	5	7	9	10	5	10	9	8	8	9		11th	230
2020						DAY1	DAY2	SEB1	ROA	ATL1	MOH	ATL2	LGA	SEB2				
2020	DPi	Cadillac DPi-V.R	Cadillac 5.5 L V8	(France) Sébastien Bourdais	5	3	3	3	4	4	6	4	7	5			5th	249
2020	DPi	Cadillac DPi-V.R	Cadillac 5.5 L V8	Various	85	5	7	8	7	8	8	8	8	4			8th	217
2021						DAY	SEB	MOH	DET	WGI1	WGI2	ROA	LAG	LBH	ATL			
2021	DPi	Cadillac DPi-V.R	Cadillac 5.5 L V8	(France) Loïc Duval (France) Tristan Vautier	5	7	1	4	5	7	4	6	6	3	7		6th	2933
2022						DAY	SEB	LBH	LGA	MDO	DET	WGL	MOS	ROA	PET			
2022	DPi	Cadillac DPi-V.R	Cadillac 5.5 L V8	(France) Tristan Vautier (United Kingdom) Richard Westbrook	5	3	2	3	4	6	5	7	5	5	7		6th	2979
2023						DAY	SEB	LBH	LGA	WGL	MOS	ELK	IMS	PET				
2023	GTP	Porsche 963	Porsche 9RD 4.6 L Turbo V8	(Netherlands) Tijmen van der Helm (Germany) Mike Rockenfeller	5				7	4	4	5	8	5			9th	1660
2024						DAY	SEB	LBH	LGA	DET	WGL	ELK	IMS	PET				
2024	GTP	Porsche 963	Porsche 9RD 4.6 L Turbo V8	(Netherlands) Tijmen van der Helm (United Kingdom) Richard Westbrook	85	6	11	7	8	8	9	6	3	11			10th	2331
2025						DAY	SEB	LBH	LGA	DET	WGL	ELK	IMS	ATL				
2025	GTP	Porsche 963	Porsche 9RD 4.6 L Turbo V8	(Italy) Gianmaria Bruni (Netherlands) Tijmen van der Helm	85	6	8	10	9	11	10	10	8	12			10th	2139
2026						DAY	SEB	LBH	LGA	DET	WGL	ELK	IMS	ATL				
2026	GTP	Porsche 963	Porsche 9RD 4.6 L Turbo V8	(United States) Kaylen Frederick (Netherlands) Tijmen van der Helm (Chile) Nico Pino (Germany) Laurin Heinrich	5	7	8	6	1	11	3	2					4th*	n/a*

=== Michelin Pilot Challenge ===
Year	Class	Car	Drivers	No.	1	2	3	4	5	6	7	8	9	10	Pos.	Pts.
2021					DAY	SEB	MOH	WGL1	WGL2	LIM	ELK	LGA	VIR	ATL		
2021	TCR	Audi RS 3 LMS TCR	(United States) Chris Miller (South Africa) Mikey Taylor	17	1	12	14	9	12	4	5	4	1	15	6th	2450
2022					DAY	SEB	LGA	MOH	WGL	MOS	LIM	ELK	VIR	ATL		
2022	TCR	Audi RS 3 LMS TCR	(United States) Chris Miller (South Africa) Mikey Taylor	17	10										10th	210

== WeatherTech SportsCar Championship wins ==
=== Overall wins ===
#	Season	Date	Classes	Track / Race	No.	Winning drivers	Chassis	Engine
1	2018	July 1	Prototype	Watkins Glen	99	(Canada) Mikhail Goikhberg / (United States) Chris Miller / (South Africa) Stephen Simpson	Oreca 07	Gibson GK428 4.2 L V8
2	2021	March 20	DPi	Sebring	5	(France) Sébastien Bourdais / (France) Loïc Duval / (France) Tristan Vautier	Cadillac DPi-V.R	Cadillac 5.5 L V8
3	2026	May 3	GTP	Monterey	5	(Netherlands) Tijmen van der Helm / (Germany) Laurin Heinrich	Porsche 963	Porsche 4.6 L V8

=== Class wins ===
#	Season	Date	Classes	Track / Race	No.	Winning drivers	Chassis	Engine
1	2016	January 30–31	PC	Daytona	85	(Canada) Mikhail Goikhberg / (United States) Kenton Koch / (United States) Chris Miller / (South Africa) Stephen Simpson	Oreca FLM09	Chevrolet LS3 6.2L V8
2	2016	April 16	PC	Long Beach	85	(Canada) Goikhberg / (South Africa) Simpson	Oreca FLM09	Chevrolet LS3 6.2L V8
