= Stephen Simpson =

South African racing driver (born 1984)

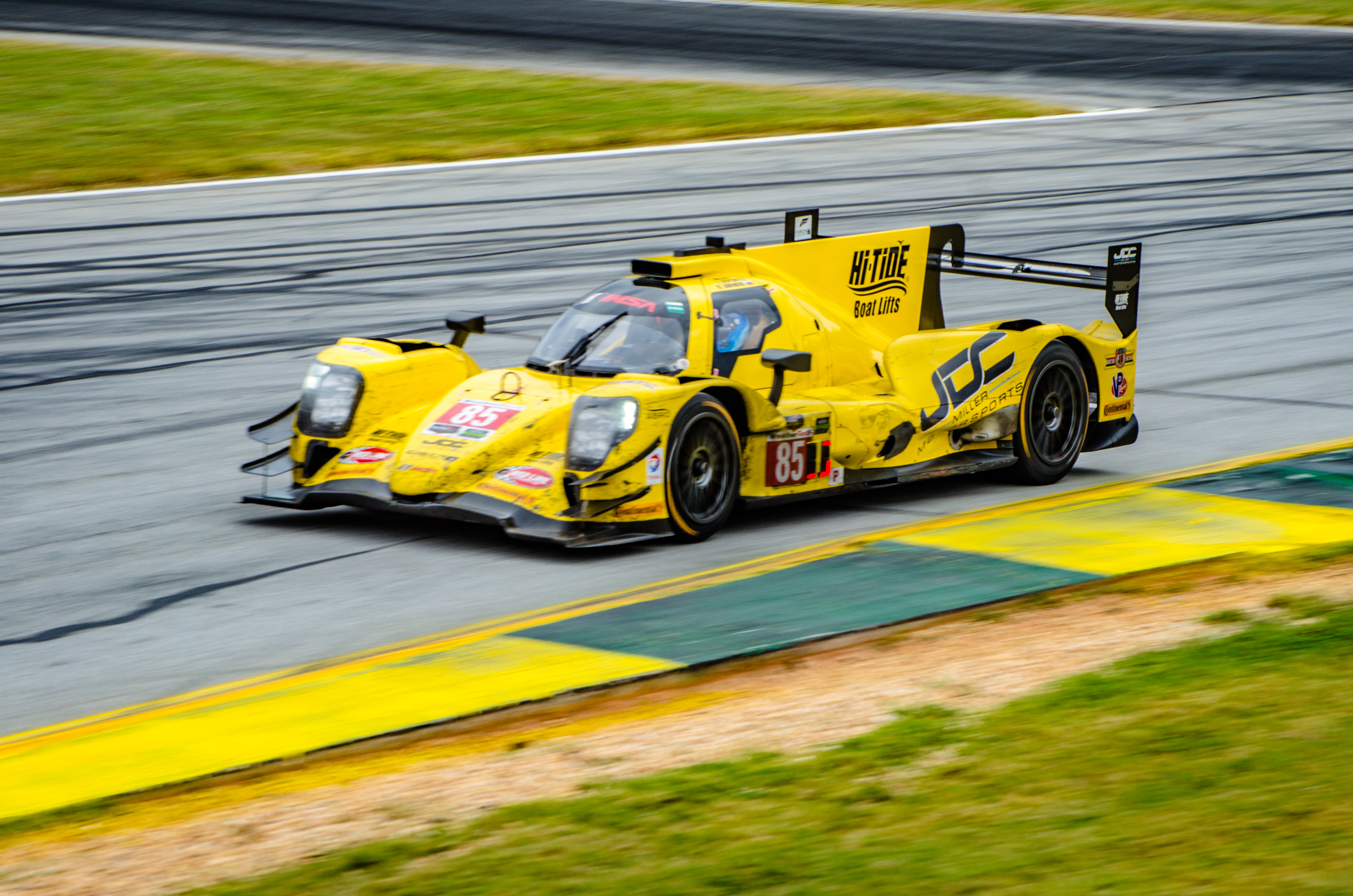
- Simpson at the 2017 Petit Le Mans
- Nationality: (South Africa) South African
- Born: 8 January 1984 (age 42) Poole, Dorset, England

WeatherTech SportsCar Championship career
- Current team: JDC-Miller MotorSports
- Categorisation: FIA Gold (until 2013); FIA Silver (2014–)
- Car number: 85
- Engine: Cadillac 5.5L V8
- Co-driver: Chris Miller; Juan Piedrahita; Simon Trummer

Stephen Simpson (born 8 January 1984) is a South African-American professional racing driver currently competing in the IMSA WeatherTech SportsCar Championship and previously in the A1 Grand Prix, Champ Car Atlantic Championship and the Indy Pro Series, among others.

== Biography ==
Simpson was born on 8 January 1984 in Poole, Dorset, England and he moved to South Africa with his family when he was ten months old. He studied at the South African College High School and graduated in 2002. He moved to the U.S. in pursuit of his motor sport career in 2006 and became a naturalized US citizen in 2018.

=== Early career ===
Simpson began karting at the age of eight and won several regional and national karting titles in South Africa.

In 2000, Simpson became the youngest ever driver to win the South African Formula Ford Championship, at the age of sixteen. In 2001, Simpson left his native South Africa to compete in the Slick 50 Formula Ford Zetec Championship in the UK. Despite poor funding the youngster was highly impressive beating factory teams on a number of occasions and culminating in being awarded the Motorsport News Race Ace award for his performance at Donington Park. He ended the season with a stirring performance in atrocious conditions at Brands Hatch in the Formula Ford Festival.

For 2002, Simpson was signed by Durango to compete in the European Formula Renault Championship and Italian Championship, however his season was dogged by bad luck and a serious lack of testing.

Just weeks before the 2003 season got underway, a potential sponsor pulled out, leaving Simpson with no alternatives and thus without a drive for the season. Simpson instead concentrated on his fitness and continued looking for the right drive.

For 2004, Simpson joined Richard Dean's Team JLR, with which he contested the prestigious British Formula Renault Championship. He finished second in the Winter Series with two wins and five podiums to his name.

=== 2005–2008 ===
Simpson was brought in to race in the inaugural A1 Grand Prix World Cup of Motorsport in winter 2005, helping A1 Team South Africa to a dismal seventeenth place in the series. His best result was a third place in the Feature Race in Dubai and he also achieved a fifth at his home event. Simpson also continued to drive for Team JLR in British Formula Renault.

For 2006, Simpson was signed to drive for Gelles Racing in the Champ Car Atlantic Series but he left the series after three races, with a best finish of fifth. Towards the end of the year, he had a test with Champ Car World Series team Mi-Jack Conquest Racing and reportedly impressed the team with his performance.

In 2007, Simpson signed with Kenn Hardley Racing to compete in the Indy Pro Series. He struggled with the oval races on the series, but finished well on the road and street courses, recording a season best third place finish at the Mid-Ohio Sports Car Course and finished ninth in the championship. Kenn Hardley Racing shut down at the end of the season and its assets were sold. He then enjoyed several very strong outings for the Creation/AIM LMP1 team in Europe and the U.S. before the Great Recession resulted in the closure of the team and he was again left without a drive.

=== 2014 to date ===
After a challenging few years without any race driving, Simpson was back in a full time race seat in 2014 driving for JDC-Miller MotorSports in the Tudor United SportsCar Championship. The highlight of the season was a third place finish at Road America. In 2015 Simpson raced in selected races in the Tudor United SportsCar Championship and finished third at the Daytona 24 Hours, second at Detroit and had a pole position at Lime Rock Park. During 2015, Simpson was also a race driver for LAP Motorsport, the official team of MINI USA.

Simpson won the PC class of the Daytona 24 hours in 2016, part of the WeatherTech SportsCar Championship.

The team moved up to the top prototype category for 2017 and enjoyed a number of podium finishes. For 2018, Simpson continued to race for JDC-Miller MotorSports in the top Prototype class of the IMSA Weathertech Championship alongside teammates Misha Goikhberg and Chris Miller in an Oreca Gibson LMP2 car, winning the 2018 Sahlens 6 Hours of the Glen at Watkins Glen. He also raced with Michael Johnson for the same team in the Continental Tire Sports Car Challenge in an Audi RS3 TCR car.

== Racing record ==
=== American open–wheel racing results ===
(key) (Races in bold indicate pole position)

==== Indy Pro Series ====
Year	Team	1	2	3	4	5	6	7	8	9	10	11	12	13	14	15	16	Rank	Points	Ref
2007	Kenn Hardley Racing	HMS; 11	STP1; 4	STP2; 20	INDY; 14	MIL; 22	IMS1; 5	IMS2; 11	IOW; 19	WGL1; 12	WGL2; 13	NSH; 7	MOH; 3	KTY; 11	SNM1; 4	SNM2; 5	CHI; 12	**9th**	**312**	

=== Complete WeatherTech SportsCar Championship results ===
(key) (Races in bold indicate pole position) (Races in italics indicate fastest lap)

Year	Entrant	Class	Make	Engine	1	2	3	4	5	6	7	8	9	10	11	Pos.	Pts
2014	JDC-Miller MotorSports	PC	Oreca FLM09	Chevrolet LS3 6.2 L V8	DAY	SEB; 4	LGA; 6	KAN; 10	WGL; 6	IMS; 7	ELK; 3	VIR	COA; 7	PET; 6		9th	210
2015	JDC-Miller MotorSports	PC	Oreca FLM09	Chevrolet LS3 6.2 L V8	DAY; 3	SEB	LGA	DET; 2	WGL	MOS	LIM; 6	ELK	COA	PET		16th	90
2016	JDC-Miller MotorSports	PC	Oreca FLM09	Chevrolet LS3 6.2 L V8	DAY; 1	SEB; 4	LBH; 1	LGA; 5	DET; 7	WGL; 4	MOS; 5	LIM; 6	ELK; 7	COA; 6	PET; 3	3rd	317
2017	JDC-Miller MotorSports	P	Oreca 07	Gibson GK428 4.2 L V8	DAY; 5	SEB; 4	LBH; 4	COA; 4	DET; 6	WGL; 2	MOS; 2	ELK; 8	LGA; 4	PET; 6		4th	277
2018	JDC-Miller MotorSports	P	Oreca 07	Gibson GK428 4.2 L V8	DAY; 7	SEB; 7	LBH; 8	MOH; 7	DET; 11	WGL; 1	MOS; 7	ELK; 2	LGA; 6	PET; 10		4th	252
2019	JDC-Miller MotorSports	DPi	Cadillac DPi-V.R	Cadillac 5.5L V8	DAY; 10	SEB; 8	LBH; 5	MOH; 7	DET; 4	WGL; 9	MOS; 8	ELK; 9	LGA; 9	PET; 5		8th	237
2020	JDC-Miller MotorSports	DPi	Cadillac DPi-V.R	Cadillac 5.5 L V8	DAY	DAY	SEB; 8	ELK	ATL; 8	MOH	ATL	LGA; 8	SEB; 4			14th	97
