= 2009 F2000 Championship Series =

2009 F2000 Championship season

Seasons
- ← 2008 2010 →

The 2009 F2000 Championship Series season was the fourth season of competition in the series. It consisted of 12 rounds (six double-race weekends), beginning April 10 at Virginia International Raceway and concluding August 16 at the Mid-Ohio Sports Car Course. Chris Miller driving for JDC MotorSports won four races and on his way to the close fought championship over the St. Clair Motorsports entry of Matthew Inge as well as other contenders Remy Audette and Benjamin Searcy. Tom Fatur won the Masters' championship over Tim Minor by only 7 points despite Minor competing in only six races and Fatur driving the entire schedule.

== Race calendar and results ==
| Round | Circuit | Location | Date | Pole position | Fastest lap | Winning driver | Winning team |
|---|---|---|---|---|---|---|---|
| 1 | Virginia International Raceway | (United States) Alton, Virginia | April 10 | (Canada) Remy Audette | (United States) Phil Lombardi | (United States) Benjamin Searcy | (United States) Zsports Midwest |
| 2 | Virginia International Raceway | (United States) Alton, Virginia | April 11 | (United States) Chris Miller | (United States) Matthew Inge | (United States) Chris Miller | (United States) JDC MotorSports |
| 3 | Lime Rock Park | (United States) Lime Rock, Connecticut | May 23 | (United States) Benjamin Searcy | (United States) Matthew Inge | (United States) Benjamin Searcy | (United States) Zsports Midwest |
| 4 | Lime Rock Park | (United States) Lime Rock, Connecticut | May 25 | (Canada) Remy Audette | (United States) Benjamin Searcy | (Canada) Remy Audette | (Canada) Audette Motorsports |
| 5 | Mosport International Raceway | (Canada) Bowmanville, Ontario | June 13 | (Canada) Remy Audette | (United States) Matthew Inge | (United States) Chris Miller | (United States) JDC MotorSports |
| 6 | Mosport International Raceway | (Canada) Bowmanville, Ontario | June 14 | (United States) Chris Miller | (United States) Matthew Inge | (United States) Matthew Inge | (United States) St. Clair Motorsports |
| 7 | Watkins Glen International | (United States) Watkins Glen, New York | July 3 | (United States) Chris Miller | (United States) Chris Miller | (United States) Chris Miller | (United States) JDC MotorSports |
| 8 | Watkins Glen International | (United States) Watkins Glen, New York | July 5 | (United States) Matthew Inge | (United States) Al Guibord, Jr. | (United States) Phil Lombardi | (United States) GTP Motorsports |
| 9 | Summit Point Motorsports Park | (United States) Summit Point, West Virginia | July 17 | (United States) Chris Miller | (United States) Chris Miller | (United States) Matthew Inge | (United States) St. Clair Motorsports |
| 10 | Summit Point Motorsports Park | (United States) Summit Point, West Virginia | July 19 | (United States) Chris Miller | (United States) Tim Minor | (United States) Tim Minor | (United States) Ski Motorsports |
| 11 | Mid-Ohio Sports Car Course | (United States) Lexington, Ohio | August 14 | (United States) Chris Miller | (United States) Tim Minor | (United States) Benjamin Searcy | (United States) Zsports Midwest |
| 12 | Mid-Ohio Sports Car Course | (United States) Lexington, Ohio | August 16 | (United States) Chris Miller | (United States) Chris Miller | (United States) Chris Miller | (United States) JDC MotorSports |

== Championship results ==
| Pos | Driver | VIR | | LRP | | MOS | | WGL | | SUM | | MOH | | Points |
Drivers' championship
| 1 | (United States) Chris Miller | 18 | **1** | 2 | 2 | 1 | **2** | **1** | 12 | **2** | **2** | 5 | **1** | 458 |
| 2 | (United States) Matthew Inge | 5 | 2 | 3 | 3 | 2 | 1 | 30 | **2** | 1 | 4 | 6 | 6 | 405 |
| 3 | (Canada) Remy Audette | **2** | 3 | 4 | **1** | **4** | 4 | 3 | 4 | 4 | 16 | 3 | 2 | 390 |
| 4 | (United States) Benjamin Searcy | 1 | 27 | **1** | 7 | 5 | 6 | DNS | 6 | 5 | 3 | 1 | 10 | 330 |
| 5 | (Brazil) Fabio Orsolon | 24 | 21 | 11 | 4 | 3 | 3 | 11 | 7 | 3 | 17 | 4 | 5 | 284 |
| 6 | (United States) Tom Fatur **(M)** | 4 | 17 | 12 | 6 | 12 | 8 | 9 | 30 | 8 | 23 | 10 | 15 | 203 |
| 7 | (United States) Tim Minor **(M)** | 10 | 4 | | | | | | | 22 | 1 | 2 | 3 | 197 |
| 8 | (United States) Al Guibord, Jr. | 9 | 6 | 6 | 10 | | | 4 | 3 | | | 13 | DNS | 190 |
| 9 | (United States) Keith McCrone | | | | | 13 | 9 | 6 | 22 | 9 | 5 | 17 | 8 | 161 |
| 10 | (Brazil) Victor Carbone | 25 | 28 | DNS | 22 | 7 | 5 | | | 6 | 20 | 7 | 4 | 157 |
| 11 | (United States) Robert Wright **(M)** | 8 | 22 | 21 | 16 | 16 | 10 | 8 | 27 | 14 | 9 | 18 | 26 | 146 |
| 12 | (United States) Craig Clawson **(M)** | 14 | 13 | 13 | 15 | 17 | 13 | 12 | 9 | 12 | 19 | 22 | 24 | 144 |
| 13 | (United States) Caitlin Johnston | 12 | 10 | 10 | 9 | DNS | 21 | 19 | 14 | | | 16 | 9 | 140 |
| 14 | (United States) Phil Lombardi | 3 | 7 | DNS | DNS | | | 2 | 1 | | | | | 138 |
| 15 | (United States) Jonathan Scarallo | 21 | 12 | 7 | 23 | 11 | 20 | 25 | 29 | 17 | 18 | 15 | 14 | 121 |
| 16 | (United States) Colin Alexander | DNS | 9 | 25 | 8 | 9 | 23 | 29 | 17 | 19 | 8 | | | 116 |
| 17 | (United States) Chris Gumprecht | 20 | 25 | 22 | 11 | | | 31 | 8 | 20 | 6 | 11 | 21 | 116 |
| 18 | (Barbados) Brent Gilkes **(M)** | 19 | 20 | 14 | 13 | 15 | 15 | 27 | 19 | 13 | 7 | | | 115 |
| 19 | (United States) Jeff McCusker **(M)** | 7 | 19 | 24 | 18 | | | 7 | 11 | 10 | 22 | DNS | 23 | 114 |
| 20 | (United States) Chris Camadella **(M)** | 23 | 14 | 9 | 21 | 21 | 11 | 5 | 32 | | | 19 | 18 | 113 |
| 21 | (United States) Jerry Szykulski **(M)** | 13 | 8 | | | 14 | 14 | | | | | 9 | 11 | 108 |
| 22 | (Mexico) Alejandro Munoz | 15 | 18 | 23 | 20 | 19 | 17 | 14 | 31 | 11 | 12 | 20 | 17 | 107 |
| 23 | (United States) Dave Weitzenhof **(M)** | 10 | 15 | | | 10 | 22 | | | | | 8 | 12 | 96 |
| 24 | (United States) Bobby Caldwell | 22 | 26 | 18 | DNS | 8 | 7 | 17 | 23 | 23 | 11 | | | 94 |
| 25 | (United States) Blake Teeter | 17 | 23 | 17 | 14 | 20 | 16 | 22 | 24 | 15 | 14 | 24 | 20 | 86 |
| 26 | (United States) Rob Nicholas | | | | | | | 13 | 5 | 7 | 21 | 25 | 25 | 78 |
| 27 | (United States) John Dole | | | 4 | 5 | | | 28 | DNS | | | | | 63 |
| 28 | (United States) Dan Denison **(M)** | | | | | 18 | 18 | 21 | 21 | 16 | 13 | 21 | 22 | 61 |
| 29 | (United States) Jesse Yorio | 26 | 5 | DNS | DNS | | | | | | | 14 | 13 | 60 |
| 30 | (United States) Brian Belardi | DNS | 12 | 8 | 12 | | | | | | | | | 59 |
| 31 | (United States) Mark Defer **(M)** | | | | | | | 26 | 28 | | | 12 | 7 | 46 |
| 32 | (United States) Peter Gonzalez **(M)** | 11 | 16 | 16 | DNS | | | | | | | | | 39 |
| 33 | (United States) Dwight Rider | | | | | | | 10 | 13 | | | | | 36 |
| 34 | (United States) Charles Finelli | | | DNS | DNS | | | 18 | 10 | | | | | 29 |
| 35 | (United States) Paul Farmer **(M)** | | | 20 | 19 | 22 | 19 | | | | | | | 21 |
| 36 | (United States) Chris Burke | | | 12 | 17 | | | | | | | | | 20 |
| 37 | (United States) Chris Fahan **(M)** | | | 12 | 24 | | | | | | | | | 19 |
| 38 | (United States) Tim Walsh | 16 | 24 | | | | | | | | | | | 12 |
| Pos | Driver | VIR | | LRP | | MOS | | WGL | | SUM | | MOH | | Points |

| Color | Result |
|---|---|
| Gold | Winner |
| Silver | 2nd place |
| Bronze | 3rd place |
| Green | 4th & 5th place |
| Light Blue | 6th–10th place |
| Dark Blue | Finished (Outside Top 10) |
| Purple | Did not finish |
| Red | Did not qualify (DNQ) |
| Brown | Withdrawn (Wth) |
| Black | Disqualified (DSQ) |
| White | Did not start (DNS) |
| Blank | Did not participate (DNP) |
| Blank | Not competing |

**In-line notation**
| **Bold** | Pole position (1 point) |
| Italics | Ran fastest race lap (1 point) |
| * | Led most race laps (1 point) |

This list only contains drivers who registered for the championship.
(M) indicates driver is participating in Masters Class for drivers over 40 years of age.
