= Misha Goikhberg =

Canadian racing driver (born 1986)

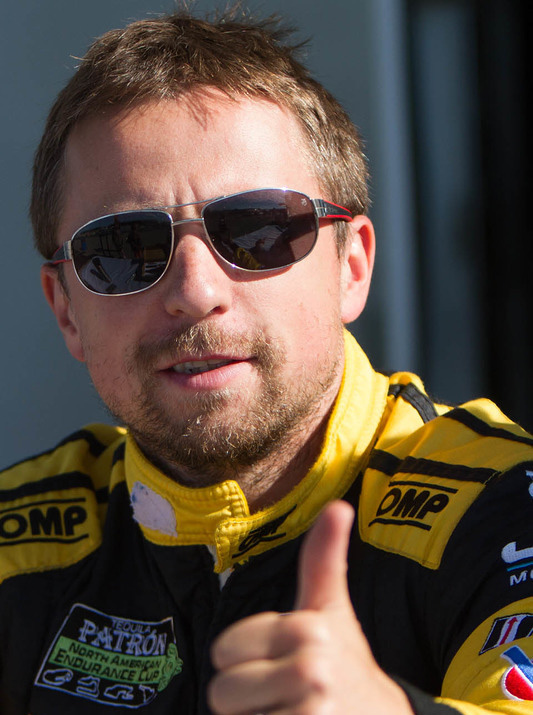
- Goikhberg signing autographs
- Nationality: Canadian
- Born: Mikhail Goikhberg; November 24, 1986 (age 39) Russia

WeatherTech SportsCar Championship career
- Debut season: 2012 IMSA Prototype Challenge
- Current team: Heinricher Racing with MSR Curb-Agajanian
- Categorisation: FIA Silver (until 2025); FIA Bronze (2026–)
- Car number: 57
- Engine: Acura 3.5 L Turbo V6
- Co-driver: Álvaro Parente
- Starts: 97
- Wins: 4
- Poles: 0
- Best finish: 3rd in 2016

Awards
- 2017, 2018: Jim Trueman Award

Mikhail "Misha" Goikhberg (born 24 November 1986) is a Russian-born Canadian race car driver who is best known for competing in the IMSA SportsCar Championship.

== Early career ==
Goikhberg's first foray into driving happened in 2003 at the Russian track of Nevskoye Kolzo (The Neva Ring) with a Lada Cup Car under guidance of experienced Russian race car driver Aleksandr Lvov. Goikhberg completed several seasons of regional karting in Canada, followed by enrollment into Skip Barber Racing School in 2008.

== Open Wheel competition ==
2009 saw Goikhberg competing with Brian Graham Racing in Ontario Formula Ford, where he finished 5th and 2nd amongst rookies. In 2010, Goikhberg signed with his current team JDC MotorSports, with which started a multi-year relationship. He competed in USF2000 claiming third spot at the end of the year having won at Laguna Seca. In 2011, he drove a limited campaign in the Star Mazda Championship. Due to lack of sponsorship, he only ran the rounds in Mosport and Sonoma. In 2019, he ran the SCCA June Sprints with Rice Race Prep in both a Formula Ford and Formula Continental. He won two races in the Formula Continental and one in the Formula F.

== Sportscar Racing competition ==
In 2012, Goikhberg and JDC MotorSports decided to move into sportscar racing teaming up for a full season in the IMSA Prototype Lites Championship. He won two rounds and finished second overall in 2012, followed by a third overall finish in 2013, and finally claimed the championship in 2014 in a commanding fashion winning nine rounds including six pole positions. Goikhberg won the $100000 Mazda Road to the 24 scholarship and moved up to the Tudor United SportsCar Championship with JDC-Miller MotorSports in 2015. 2015 was a challenging rookie year for Goikhberg, who finished fourth overall in the driver championship claiming three podiums at Daytona, Detroit and Canadian Tire Motorsport Park.

In 2016, Goikhberg teamed up with Stephen Simpson as his full season teammate. Driving again for JDC-Miller MotorSports in the Prototype Challenge category of the WeatherTech Sportscar Championship, the pair has scored two victories, winning the Rolex 24 Hours of Daytona and the Long Beach Grand Prix. Goikhberg finished the 2016 season in third position in the driver standings and has moved up to Prototype class for 2017 WeatherTech SportsCar Championship.

In 2018, Goikhberg and co-driver Simpson would swap rides, piloting the return of the No. 99 "Red Dragon" with sponsorship from GAINSCO/Bob Stallings Racing as JDC-Miller expanded to a second Oreca 07. and would win that year's 6 Hours of Watkins Glen, the first Prototype victory for JDC-Miller MotorSports.

In 2019, Goikhberg returned to the familiar No. 85 JDC-Miller MotorSports entry with new teammate Tristan Vautier, as the team moved for the first year to a Cadillac DPi-V.R. The Cadillac DPi-V.R is a prototype racing car which started competing in the IMSA WeatherTech SportsCar Championship in North America in 2017. With the switch to the IMSA DPi class, Goikhberg would compete in the highest form of prototype sportscar racing in North America.

For 2020, Goikhberg teamed up with Álvaro Parente in a full-season effort in the GT Daytona category. They would pilot the No. 57 Acura NSX GT3 Evo for Heinricher Racing with Meyer Shank. They would be joined for all four of the Michelin Endurance Cup races by Trent Hindman. A. J. Allmendinger would also join the lineup for the 24 Hours of Daytona.

== Racing record ==
=== Career summary ===
Season	Series	Team	Races	Wins	Poles	F/Laps	Podiums	Points	Position
2014	United SportsCar Championship - PC	JDC-Miller MotorSports	1	0	0	0	0	26	39th
2015	United SportsCar Championship - PC	JDC-Miller MotorSports	10	0	0	0	3	285	4th
2016	IMSA SportsCar Championship - PC	JDC-Miller MotorSports	11	2	0	0	3	317	**3rd**
2017	IMSA SportsCar Championship - Prototype	JDC-Miller MotorSports	10	0	0	0	2	277	4th
2018	IMSA SportsCar Championship - Prototype	JDC-Miller MotorSports	10	1	0	0	2	252	4th
2019	IMSA SportsCar Championship - DPi	JDC-Miller MotorSports	10	0	0	0	0	230	11th
2020	IMSA SportsCar Championship - GTD	Heinricher Racing with MSR	9	0	0	0	1	250	7th
2021	IMSA SportsCar Championship - GTD	GRT Grasser Racing Team	9	0	0	0	1	1410	17th
2022	IMSA SportsCar Championship - GTD	T3 Motorsport North America	1	0	0	0	0	239	57th
2023	IMSA SportsCar Championship - GTD	US RaceTronics	11	1	0	0	2	2921	5th
2024	IMSA SportsCar Championship - GTD	Forte Racing	10	0	0	0	2	2554	5th
2025	IMSA SportsCar Championship - GTD	Forte Racing	10	0	0	0	1	2266	13th
2026	IMSA SportsCar Championship - LMP2	Bryan Herta Autosport with PR1/Mathiasen	7	0	0	0	1	2021	5th

=== Complete WeatherTech SportsCar Championship results ===
(key) (Races in bold indicate pole position) (Races in italics indicate fastest lap)

Year	Entrant	Class	Make	Engine	1	2	3	4	5	6	7	8	9	10	11	12	Pos.	Pts	Ref
2014	JDC-Miller MotorSports	PC	Oreca FLM09	Chevrolet LS3 6.2 L V8	DAY	SEB	LGA	KAN	WGL	IND	ELK	VIR	COA	PET; 6			39th	26	
2015	JDC-Miller MotorSports	PC	Oreca FLM09	Chevrolet LS3 6.2 L V8	DAY; 3	SEB; 4	LGA; 4	DET; 2	WGL; 5	MOS; 3	LIM; 6	ELK; 7	COA; 5	PET; 5			4th	285	
2016	JDC-Miller MotorSports	PC	Oreca FLM09	Chevrolet LS3 6.2 L V8	DAY; 1	SEB; 4	LBH; 1	LGA; 5	DET; 7	WGL; 4	MOS; 5	LIM; 6	ELK; 7	COA; 6	PET; 3		3rd	317	
2017	JDC-Miller MotorSports	P	Oreca 07	Gibson GK428 4.2 L V8	DAY; 5	SEB; 4	LBH; 4	AUS; 4	DET; 6	WGL; 2	MOS; 2	ELK; 8	LGA; 4	PET; 6			4th	277	
2018	JDC-Miller MotorSports	P	Oreca 07	Gibson GK428 4.2 L V8	DAY; 7	SEB; 7	LBH; 8	MDO; 7	DET; 11	WGL; 1	MOS; 7	ELK; 2	LGA; 6	PET; 10			4th	252	
2019	JDC-Miller MotorSports	DPi	Cadillac DPi-V.R	Cadillac 5.5L V8	DAY; 5	SEB; 7	LBH; 9	MDO; 10	DET; 5	WGL; 10	MOS; 9	RA; 8	LGA; 8	PET; 9			11th	230	
2020	Heinricher Racing with MSR	GTD	Acura NSX GT3 Evo	Acura 3.5 L Turbo V6	DAY; 8	DAY; 4	SEB	ELK; 12	RA; 7	MO; 6	CHA; 5	PET; 6	LGA; 3	SEB; 6			7th	250	
2021	GRT Grasser Racing Team	GTD	Lamborghini Huracán GT3 Evo	Lamborghini 5.2 L V10	DAY; 19	SEB	MOH	DET; 2	WGL; 13	WGL; 11	LIM; 7	ELK; 15	LGA	LBH; 17	VIR; 9	PET; 13	17th	1410	
2022	T3 Motorsport North America	GTD	Lamborghini Huracán GT3 Evo	Lamborghini 5.2 L V10	DAY; 8	SEB	LBH	LGA	MDO	DET	WGL	MOS	LIM	ELK	VIR	PET	57th	239	
2023	US RaceTronics	GTD	Lamborghini Huracán GT3 Evo 2	Lamborghini 5.2 L V10	DAY; 7	SEB; 17	LBH; 7	MON; 9	WGL; 7	MOS; 14	LIM; 5	ELK; 4	VIR; 14	IMS; 2	PET; 1		5th	2921	
2024	Forte Racing	GTD	Lamborghini Huracán GT3 Evo 2	Lamborghini 5.2 L V10	DAY; 16	SEB; 5	LBH; 11	LGA; 8	WGL; 14	MOS; 9	ELK; 14	VIR; 2	IMS; 4	PET; 2			5th	2554	
2025	Forte Racing	GTD	Lamborghini Huracán GT3 Evo 2	Lamborghini 5.2 L V10	DAY; 12	SEB; 12	LBH; 12	LGA; 5	WGL; 14	MOS; 13	ELK; 2	VIR; 12	IMS; 13	PET; 13			13th	2266	
2026	Bryan Herta Autosport with PR1/Mathiasen	LMP2	Oreca 07	Gibson GK428 4.2 L V8	DAY; 6	SEB; 8	WGL; 6	MOS; 4	ELK; 6	IMS; 2	PET; 8						5th	2021	

^{*} Season still in progress.
