= Rich Zober =

American racing driver

Richard Zober
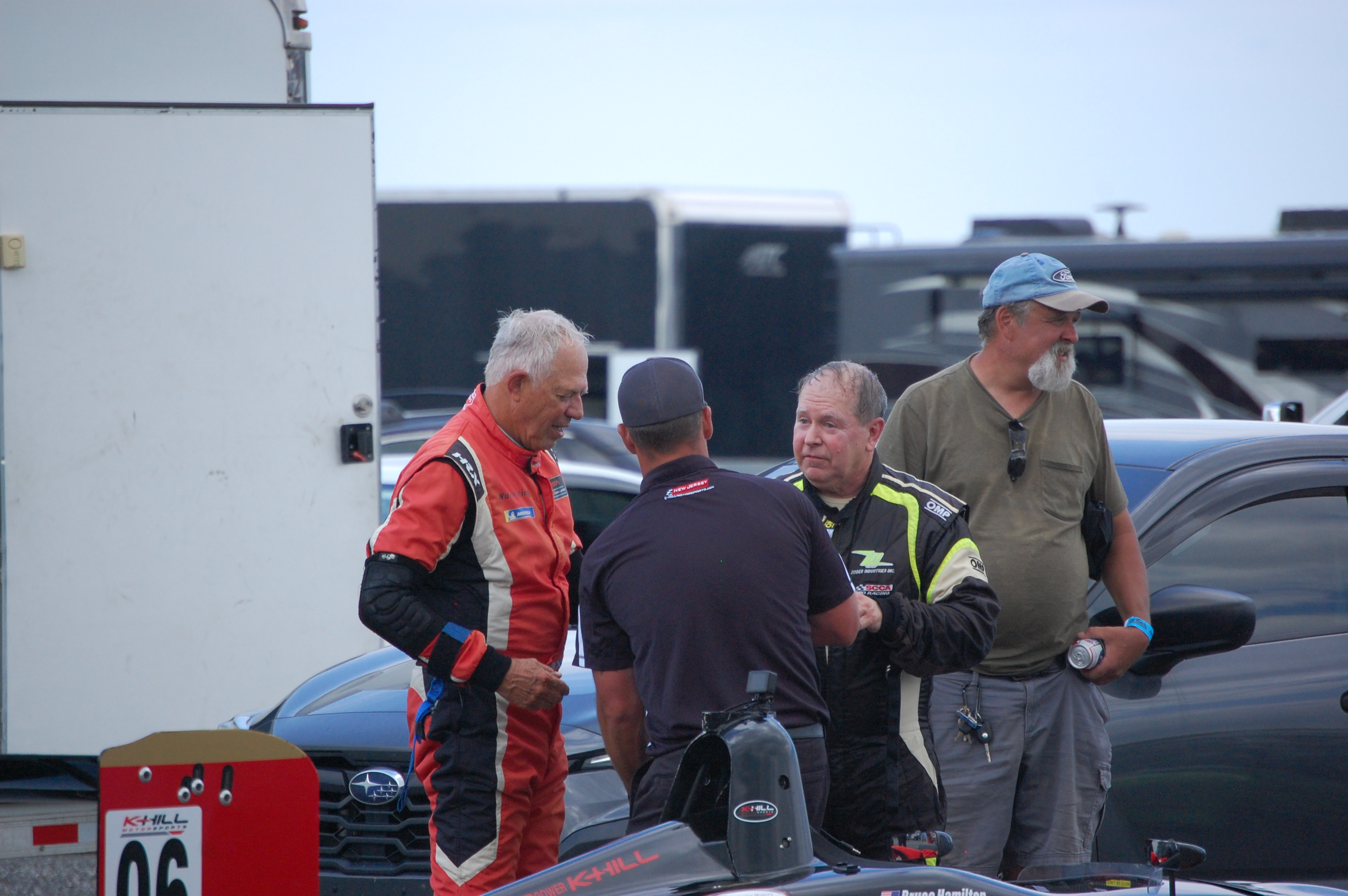
- Zober (second from right) at New Jersey Motorsports Park in 2025
- Born: February 22, 1966 (age 60) Newtown, Pennsylvania, U.S.

Atlantic Championship career
- Debut season: 2004
- Current team: Comprent Motorsports
- Car number: 66
- Former teams: Polestar Racing Group (2008, 2009)
- Starts: 12
- Best finish: 8th in 2012

Previous series
- 2012 2011 2010 2008–2009 2006–2008 2004–2005 2002–2003 2000–2001: Atlantic Championship; SCCA Formula Atlantic; IMSA Lites L1; Atlantic Championship; Star Mazda; Atlantic Championship; SCCA Formula Atlantic; USF2000

Richard Zober (born 22 February 1966) is a racing driver who competed in various formula racing series.

== Racing career ==
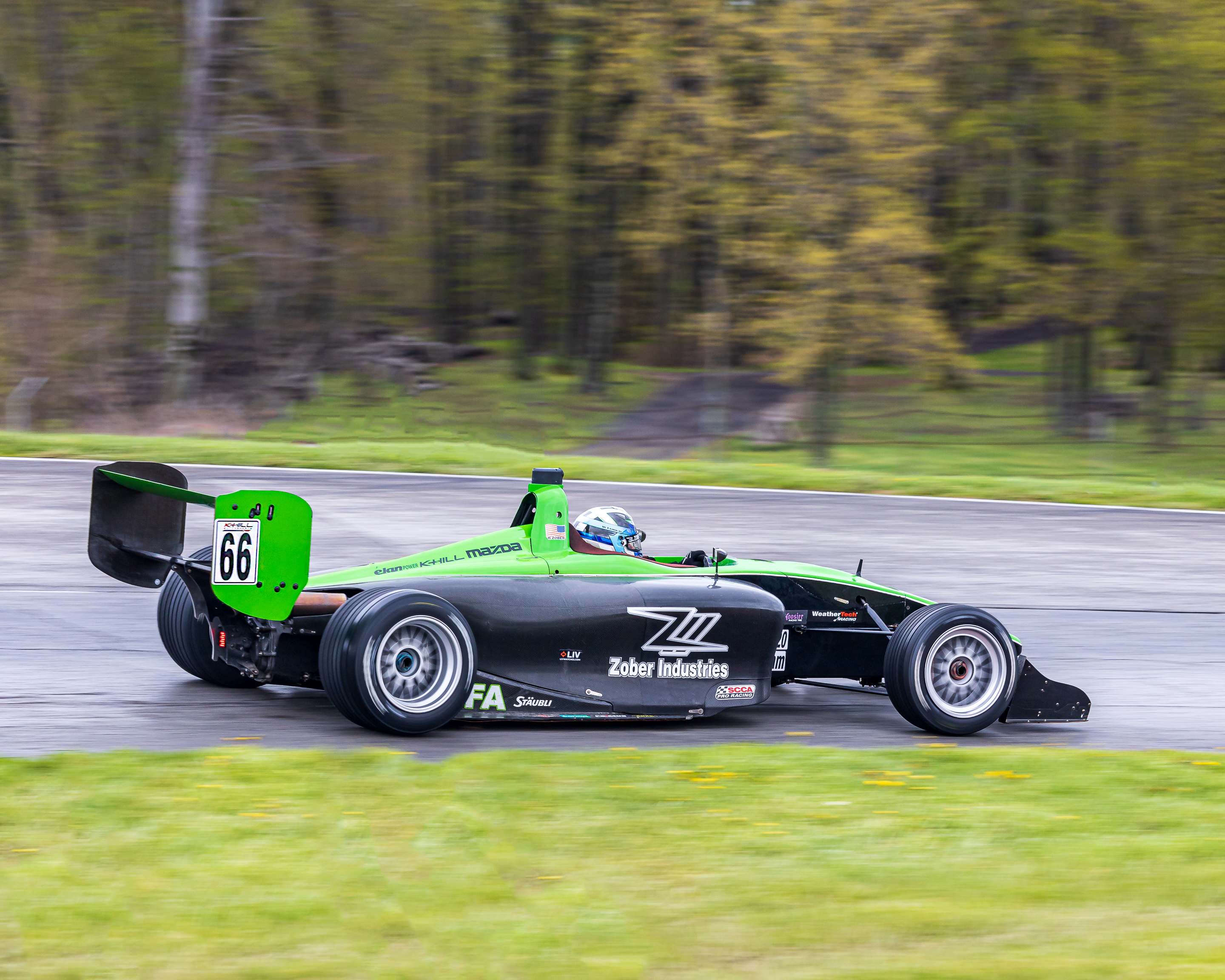
Zober at Mid-Ohio in 2023

Zober started auto racing in 1995 in the SCCA Formula Continental class. He finished eighteenth in the SCCA National Championship Runoffs. He made his debut in the USF2000 championship in 2000. He competed in four races at Road America and Watkins Glen International. He competed in the American Continental Class for older F2000 cars. Zober scored a total of 23 points which placed him ninth in the championship. He returned the following season for two races at Mid-Ohio Sports Car Course. This time, he competed in a new Van Diemen in the National Championship class. During the first race, Zober spun after which he retired. He managed to finish the second race as the last car running. The following year, he switched to the SCCA Formula Atlantic class driving a Swift 008.a. After two years in the amateur series, he made his debut in the pro Atlantic Championship. Zober participated at Circuit Gilles Villeneuve in the C2 class for older Formula Atlantic cars in a Swift 008.a. He finished twelfth overall, second in class. Comprent Motorsports entered Zober the following season in the Atlantics support races at the Grand Prix of Cleveland. Again in the C2 class, he achieved his first top-ten finish finishing eighth in the first race. In 2008 and 2009, Zober drove for Polestar Racing Group in the championship class. His best finish was an eleventh place at Lime Rock Park in 2009. Zober drove his first full season in the Atlantic Championship in 2012. After the downfall of Champ Car, the series was revived by SCCA Pro Racing for 2012. Zober achieved four top-ten finishes and was placed eighth in the championship.

== Racing record ==
=== SCCA National Championship Runoffs ===
Year	Track	Car	Engine	Class	Finish	Start	Status
1994	Mid-Ohio	Swift DB6	Ford	Formula Continental	18	25	Running
2002	Mid-Ohio	Swift 008.a	Toyota 4AGE	Formula Atlantic	10	6	Running
2003	Mid-Ohio	Swift 008.a	Toyota 4AGE	Formula Atlantic	22	14	DNF
2011	Road America	Swift 016.a	Mazda-Cosworth MZR	Formula Atlantic	10	11	Running
2012	Road America	Swift 016.a	Mazda-Cosworth MZR	Formula Atlantic	6	7	Running
2013	Road America	Swift 016.a	Mazda-Cosworth MZR	Formula Atlantic	DNS	17	DNS
2014	Laguna Seca	Swift 016.a	Mazda-Cosworth MZR	Formula Atlantic	12	3	DNF
2020	Road America	Swift 016.a	Mazda-Cosworth MZR	Formula Atlantic	3	6	Running

=== American open–wheel racing results ===
(key) (Races in bold indicate pole position) (Races in italics indicate fastest lap)

==== Complete USF2000 National Championship results ====
Year	Entrant	1	2	3	4	5	6	7	8	9	10	11	12	13	14	Pos	Points
1999	Richard Zober	PIR	CHA1	CHA2	MOS	MOS	MOH	ATL	ROA1; 18	ROA2; 19	CTR	MOH	PPI	SEB1	SEB2	**N.C.**	**N.C.**
2000	Richard Zober	PIR	MOS1	MOS2	IRP1	ROA1; 24	ROA1; 30	TRR	MOS3	WGI1; 16	WGI2; 25	IRP2	ATL1	ATL1		**N.C.**	**N.C.**
2001	Richard Zober	HMS1	HMS2	HMS3	WGI1	WGI2	IRP	MOH1; 24	MOH2; 18	ROA1	ROA2	MOH3	SEB1	SEB2		**26th**	**4**
2005	Richard Zober	ROA1; 21	ROA2; 28	MOH1; DNS	MOH2; DNS	CLE1; 21	CLE2; 25	ROA3	ROA4	MOH3	MOH4	VIR1; 12	VIR2; 13			**25th**	**21**

==== Star Mazda Championship ====
Year	Team	1	2	3	4	5	6	7	8	9	10	11	12	Rank	Points
2006	Comprent Motorsports	SEB	HOU	MOH	MIL	MON	MMP; 23	POR	TRR	RAM; 21	MOS	RAT; 17	LAG	**N.C.**	**N.C.**
2007	Comprent Motorsports	SEB	HOU	VIR; 14	MMP; 14	POR	CLE; 10	TOR	RAM; 11	TRR	MOS	RAT; 12	LAG	**27th**	**119**
2008	Comprent Motorsports	SEB	UTA; 22	WGI; 16	POR	POR	ROA; 17	TRR	MOS	NJ1; 22	NJ2; 17	ATL	LAG	**22nd**	**99**

==== Atlantic Championship ====
Year	Team	1	2	3	4	5	6	7	8	9	10	11	12	13	14	15	Rank	Points
2004	Comprent Motorsports	LBH	MTY	MIL	POR1	POR2	CLE	TOR	VAN	ROA	DEN	MTL; 12	LS				N.C.	0
2005	Comprent Motorsports	LBH	MTY	POR1	POR2	CLE1; 8	CLE2; 13	TOR	EDM	SJO	DEN	ROA	MTL				N.C.	0
2008	Polestar Racing Group	LBH	LS	MTT	EDM1	EDM2	ROA1	ROA2	TRR	NJ; 17	UTA	ATL					27th	4
2009	Polestar Racing Group	SEB	UTA	NJ1; 12	NJ2; 12	LIM; 11	ACC1	ACC2	MOH	TRR	MOS	ATL	LS				18th	7
2012	Comprent Motorsports	ATL1; DNF	ATL2; DNS	NJ1; 9	NJ2; 8	SUM1; 7	SUM2; 9										8th	99
2014	Comprent Motorsports	ATL1; 8	ATL2; 15	WGI1; 9	WGI2; 8	VIR1; 6	VIR2; 9	MOH1; 9	MOH2; 15	TOM1	TOM2						10th	160
2015	Comprent Motorsports	PBI	ATL; 3	ATL; 9	WGL; 9	WGL; 5	VIR; 5	VIR; 13	MOH; DNS	MOH; 6	PIT; 4	PIT; 7	NJMP; 4	NJMP; 11	PIT; 5	PIT; 6	7th	303
