= 2012 Atlantic Championship =

2012 Atlantic Championship Series season

Season
- Races: 6
- Start date: May 11th
- End date: August 26th

Awards
- Drivers' champion: (United States) David Grant

The 2012 Atlantic Championship Series season was the first season of the revived Atlantic Championship. The series was organised by Formula Race Promotions under the sanctioning of SCCA Pro Racing. Hoosier was introduced as the series spec tire. David Grant racing for Polestar Racing Group won the championship. After this season the series went on probation to return in 2014.

== Drivers and teams ==
Team	No.	Drivers	Chassis	Engine
(United States) Company Motorsports	55	(United States) John Burke	Swift 014.a	Toyota 4AGE
(United States) Company Motorsports	19	(United States) Connor Burke	Swift 014.a	Toyota 4AGE
(United States) Comprent Motorsports	66	(United States) Rich Zober	Swift 016.a	Mazda-Cosworth MZR
(United States) Dole Racing	6	(United States) John Dole	Swift 016.a	Mazda-Cosworth MZR
(United States) Fahan Racing	39	(United States) Chris Fahan	Swift 016.a	Mazda-Cosworth MZR
(United States) Fat Boy Racing by John Walko Racing	31	(United States) Brendan Puderbach	Star Mazda	Mazda Rotary
(United States) Fat Boy Racing by John Walko Racing	31	(United States) Charles Finelli	Star Mazda	Mazda Rotary
(United States) Front Range Motorsports	11	(United States) Dwight Rider	Ralt RT41	Toyota 4AGE
(United States) K-Hill Motorsports	96	(Estonia) Tõnis Kasemets	Swift 014.a	Toyota 4AGE
(United States) K-Hill Motorsports	36	(United States) Bruce Hamilton	Swift 016.a	Mazda-Cosworth MZR
(United States) K-Hill Motorsports	2	(United States) Theodoras Zorbas	Swift 014.a	Toyota 4AGE
(United States) K-Hill Motorsports		(United States) Jean-Luc Liverato	Swift 016.a	Mazda-Cosworth MZR
(United States) K-Hill Motorsports	24	(United States) Lee Brahin	Swift 016.a	Mazda-Cosworth MZR
(United States) K-Hill Motorsports	34	(United States) Andy Schaufelberger	Swift 016.a	Mazda-Cosworth MZR
(United States) LeCain Racing	90	(United States) Paul LeCain	Ralt RT41	Toyota 4AGE
(United States) Mid-Atlantic Motorsports	29	(United States) Joe Blacker	Ralt RT41	Toyota 4AGE
(United States) Polestar Racing Group	12	(United States) David Grant	Swift 014.a	Toyota 4AGE
(United States) Polestar Racing Group	20	(United States) Keith Grant	Swift 014.a	Toyota 4AGE
(United States) Primus Racing	151	(United States) Nick Neri	Swift 016.a	Mazda-Cosworth MZR
(United States) Swan Motorsports	71	(United States) Michael Mällinen	Swift 014.a	Toyota 4AGE
(United States) Swan Motorsports		(United States) Rob Sherwood	Swift 016.a	Mazda-Cosworth MZR
(United States) Swan Motorsports	6	(United States) Mirl Swan	Swift 016.a	Mazda-Cosworth MZR
(United States) Swan Motorsports	28	(United States) Jason Byers	Swift 014.a	Toyota 4AGE
(United States) Thompson Racing	5	(United States) John Thompson	Swift 014.a	Toyota 4AGE
		(United States) Charles Duncan	Swift 016.a	Mazda-Cosworth MZR
	46	(United States) Joseph Tauro	Swift 016.a	Mazda-Cosworth MZR
		(United States) Richard Ross	Ralt RT40	Toyota 4AGE

== Race calendar and results ==
Round	Circuit	Location	Date	Pole position	Fastest lap	Winning driver
1	Road Atlanta	(United States) Braselton, Georgia	May 11	(United States) David Grant	(United States) David Grant	(United States) David Grant
2	Road Atlanta	(United States) Braselton, Georgia	May 12	(United States) David Grant	(United States) David Grant	(United States) David Grant
3	New Jersey Motorsports Park	(United States) Millville, New Jersey	June 30	(United States) Paul LeCain	(United States) David Grant	(United States) David Grant
4	New Jersey Motorsports Park	(United States) Millville, New Jersey	July 1	(United States) David Grant	(United States) David Grant	(United States) David Grant
5	Summit Point Motorsports Park	(United States) Summit Point, West Virginia	August 25	(Estonia) Tõnis Kasemets	(Estonia) Tõnis Kasemets	(Estonia) Tõnis Kasemets
6	Summit Point Motorsports Park	(United States) Summit Point, West Virginia	August 26		(United States) John Dole	(United States) John Dole

== Final standings ==
Color	Result
Gold	Winner
Silver	2nd place
Bronze	3rd place
Green	4th & 5th place
Light Blue	6th–10th place
Dark Blue	11th place or lower
Purple	Did not finish
Red	Did not qualify (DNQ)
Brown	Withdrawn (Wth)
Black	Disqualified (DSQ)
White	Did not start (DNS)
Blank	Did not participate (DNP)
Blank	Driver replacement (Rpl)
Blank	Injured (Inj)
Blank	No race held (NH)

Pos	Driver	(United States) ATL1	(United States) ATL2	(United States) NJ1	(United States) NJ2	(United States) SUM1	(United States) SUM2	Points
1	(United States) David Grant	1	1	1	1	2	2	304
2	(United States) Keith Grant	2	3	3	2	3	3	232
3	(United States) John Burke	4	7	4	4	6	5	189
4	(United States) Bruce Hamilton	5	2	8	10	9	7	142
5	(United States) Dwight Rider	7	4	11	11	DNF	4	134
6	(United States) John Dole			5	9	8	1	131
7	(United States) Chris Fahan			6	5	5	8	116
8	(United States) Rich Zober	DNF	DNS	9	8	7	9	99
9	(Estonia) Tõnis Kasemets					1	6	87
10	(United States) Theodoras Zorbas	9	5	12	14			84
11	(United States) Paul LeCain			2	3			82
12	(United States) Connor Burke			15	6	4	DNF	75
13	(United States) Andy Schaufelberger			10	15	10	10	74
14	(United States) Jason Byers	3	8					62
15	(United States) John Thompson			7	7			54
16	(United States) Joe Blacker	8	9	13	DNF			42
17	(United States) Brendan Puderbach		6			DNF	DNS	30
18	(United States) Charles Finelli	6						29
19	(United States) Lee Brahin			14	13			28
20	(United States) Joe Tauro				12			17
21	(United States) Nick Neri					DNF	DNS	1
	(United States) Michael Mällinen	DNS						
	(United States) Mirl Swan	DNS						

== See also ==
- 2012 F1600 Championship Series season
- 2012 F2000 Championship Series season
