= 2017 6 Hours of The Glen =

Endurance race

Track Map of Watkins Glen International.

The 2017 Sahlen's Six Hours of the Glen was an endurance race sanctioned by the International Motor Sports Association (IMSA). The race was held at Watkins Glen International in Watkins Glen, New York on the July 2nd, 2017. This race was the sixth round of the 2017 WeatherTech SportsCar Championship.

== Background ==
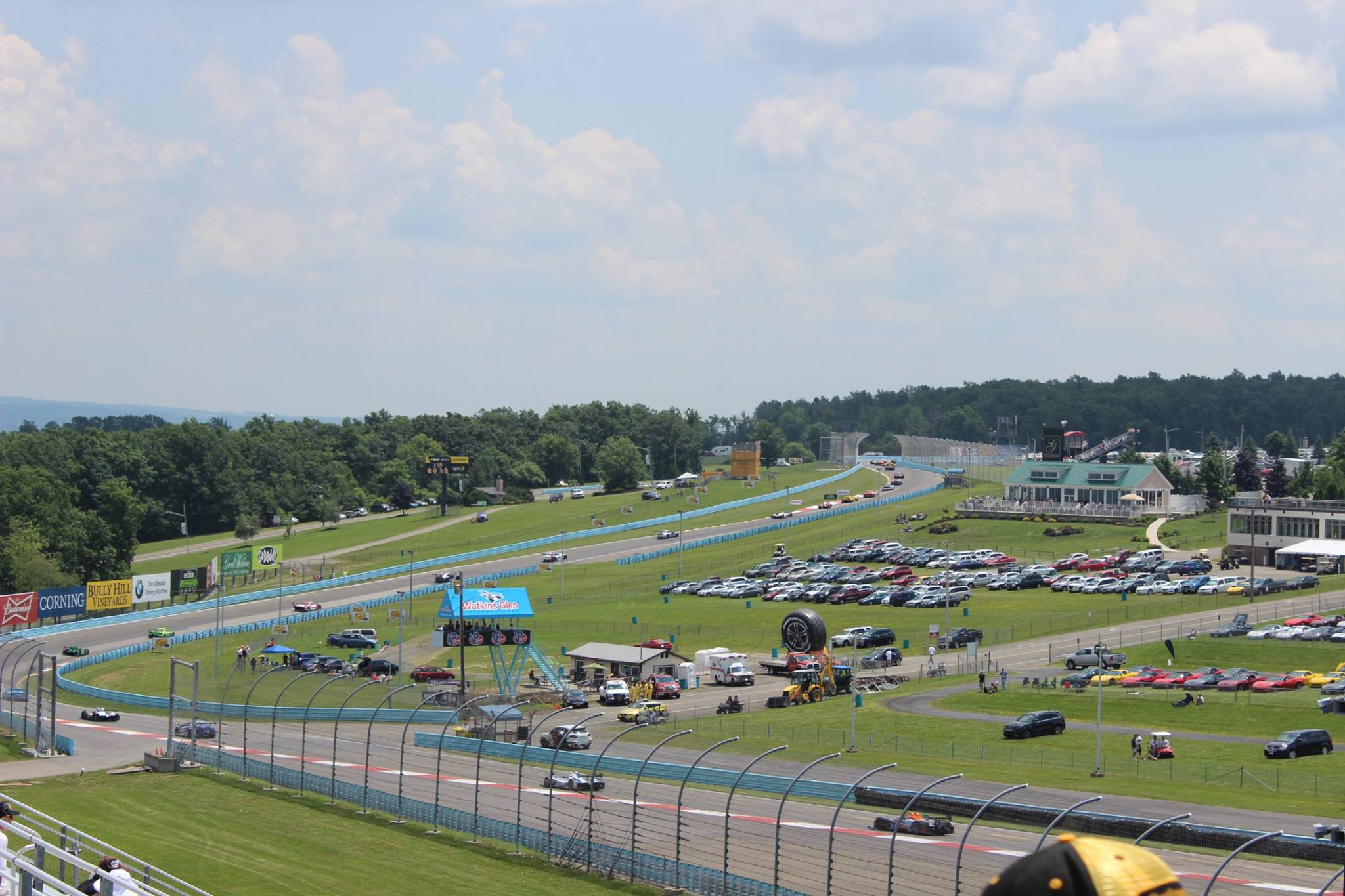
Watkins Glen International, where the race was held.

IMSA's president Scott Atherton confirmed the 6 Hours of The Glen was part of the series' schedule for the 2017 IMSA SportsCar Championship at Road America's victory lane in August 2016. It was the fourth consecutive year the event was held as part of the WeatherTech SportsCar Championship. The 2017 Sahlen's 6 Hours of the Glen was the sixth of twelve scheduled sports car races of 2017 by IMSA, and was the third round of the Patron North American Endurance Cup. The race was held at the eleven-turn 3.450 mi (5.552 km) Watkins Glen International circuit on July 2, 2017. After the Chevrolet Sports Car Classic four weeks earlier, Jordan Taylor and Ricky Taylor led the Prototype Drivers' Championship with 177 points, ahead of João Barbosa and Christian Fittipaldi with 147 points, and Dane Cameron and Eric Curran with 143 points. With 144 points, was led by James French and Patricio O'Ward with a twenty six-point advantage over Don Yount. Antonio García and Jan Magnussen led the GTLM Drivers' Championship with 124 points, ahead of Joey Hand and Dirk Müller with 118 points. In GTD, the Drivers' Championship was led by Ben Keating and Jeroen Bleekemolen with 150 points, ahead of Alessandro Balzan and Christina Nielsen with 141 points. Cadillac, Chevrolet, and Mercedes-AMG were leading their respective Manufacturers' Championships, while Wayne Taylor Racing, Performance Tech Motorsports, Corvette Racing, and Riley Motorsports Team AMG each led their own Teams' Championships.

== Entries ==
A total of 38 cars took part in the event split across 4 classes. 10 cars were entered in P, 3 in PC, 8 in GTLM, and 17 in GTD. In P, Rebellion Racing missed the event due to logistical issues. Olivier Pla joined José Gutiérrez in the PR1/Mathiasen Motorsports entry. Ed Brown missed the event due to injury and retired from prototype racing. In PC, Starworks Motorsport were absent. Buddy Rice and Daniel Burkett returned to the #20 BAR1 Motorsports entry. Brian Alder and Derek Jones joined Gustavo Yacamán in the #26 BAR1 Motorsports entry. In GTLM, Risi Competizione were forced to miss the event due to budgetary issues following the 24 Hours of Le Mans, where the team's Ferrari 488 GTE was severely damaged in an accident. Gianmaria Bruni made his debut for Porsche joining Laurens Vanthoor in the #912 Porsche GT Team entry. In GTD, Alex Job Racing, and Dream Racing Motorsport made their first appearances since the 12 Hours of Sebring. Michael Christensen and Michael de Quesada returned to Alegra Motorsports.

== Practice ==
There were three practice sessions preceding the start of the race on Saturday, two on Friday and one on Saturday. The first two one-hour sessions were on Friday morning and afternoon. The third on Saturday morning lasted an hour.

=== Practice 1 ===
The first practice session took place at 11:05 am ET on Friday and ended with Stephen Simpson topping the charts for JDC-Miller MotorSports, with a lap time of 1:35.491.

Pos.	Class	No.	Team	Driver	Time	Gap
1	P	85	JDC-Miller MotorSports	Stephen Simpson	1:35.491	_
2	P	2	Tequila Patrón ESM	Ryan Dalziel	1:35.530	+0.039
3	P	5	Mustang Sampling Racing	João Barbosa	1:36.813	+1.322

=== Practice 2 ===
The second practice session took place at 3:30 pm ET on Friday and ended with Pipo Derani topping the charts for Tequila Patrón ESM, with a lap time of 1:34.696.

Pos.	Class	No.	Team	Driver	Time	Gap
1	P	2	Tequila Patrón ESM	Pipo Derani	1:34.696	_
2	P	22	Tequila Patrón ESM	Bruno Senna	1:35.293	+0.597
3	P	52	PR1/Mathiasen Motorsports	Olivier Pla	1:35.377	+0.681

=== Practice 3 ===
The third and final practice session took place at 8:00 am ET on Saturday and ended with Olivier Pla topping the charts for PR1/Mathiasen Motorsports, with a lap time of 1:48.566.

Pos.	Class	No.	Team	Driver	Time	Gap
1	P	52	PR1/Mathiasen Motorsports	Olivier Pla	1:48.566	_
2	P	5	Mustang Sampling Racing	Christian Fittipaldi	1:49.281	+0.715
3	P	90	VisitFlorida Racing	Renger van der Zande	1:50.769	+2.203

== Qualifying ==
In Saturday afternoon's 90-minute four-group qualifying, each category had separate 15-minute sessions. Regulations stipulated that teams nominate one qualifying driver, with the fastest laps determining each class' starting order. IMSA arranged the grid to put Prototypes ahead of the PC, GTLM and GTD cars.

The first was for cars in GTD class. Andy Lally qualified on pole for the class driving the #93 Meyer-Shank Racing with Curb-Agajanian, beating Lawson Aschenbach in the #57 Stevenson Motorsports entry.

The second session of qualifying was for cars in the GTLM class. Joey Hand qualified on pole driving the #66 Ford Chip Ganassi Racing entry, besting Alexander Sims in the #25 BMW Team RLL entry by just over three tenths of a second.

The third session of qualifying was for cars in the PC class. James French set the fastest time driving the #38 Performance Tech Motorsports entry.

The final session of qualifying was for the P class. Pipo Derani qualified on pole, besting Olivier Pla in the #52 PR1/Mathiasen Motorsports entry.

=== Qualifying Results ===
Pole positions in each class are indicated in bold and by ‡.

Pos.	Class	No.	Team	Driver	Time	Gap	Grid
1	**DPi**	**2**	**(United States) Tequila Patrón ESM**	**(Brazil) Pipo Derani**	**1:34.405**	**_**	1 ‡
2	DPi	52	(United States) PR1/Mathiasen Motorsports	(France) Olivier Pla	1:34.567	+0.162	2
3	DPi	5	(United States) Mustang Sampling Racing	(Brazil) Christian Fittipaldi	1:35.306	+0.901	3
4	DPi	10	(United States) Wayne Taylor Racing	(United States) Ricky Taylor	1:35.496	+1.091	4
5	DPi	22	(United States) Tequila Patrón ESM	(United States) Johannes van Overbeek	1:35.637	+1.119	5
6	DPi	31	(United States) Whelen Engineering Racing	(United States) Eric Curran	1:36.103	+1.698	6
7	DPi	90	(United States) VisitFlorida Racing	(Netherlands) Renger van der Zande	1:36.129	+1.724	7
8	DPi	85	(United States) JDC-Miller MotorSports	(Canada) Misha Goikhberg	1:36.799	+2.394	8
9	DPi	55	(Japan) Mazda Motorsports	(United States) Tristan Nunez	1:36.886	+2.481	9
10	DPi	70	(Japan) Mazda Motorsports	(United States) Joel Miller	1:36.981	+2.576	10
11	**PC**	**38**	**(United States)** Performance Tech Motorsports	**(United States) James French**	**1:40.049**	**+5.644**	11 ‡
12	PC	20	(United States) BAR1 Motorsports	(United States) Don Yount	1:42.125	+7.720	12
13	**GTLM**	**66**	**(United States) Ford Chip Ganassi Racing**	**(United States) Joey Hand**	**1:42.507**	**+8.102**	14 ‡
14	GTLM	25	(United States) BMW Team RLL	(United Kingdom) Alexander Sims	1:42.813	+8.408	15
15	GTLM	24	(United States) BMW Team RLL	(Germany) Martin Tomczyk	1:42.881	+8.476	16
16	GTLM	67	(United States) Ford Chip Ganassi Racing	(United Kingdom) Richard Westbrook	1:42.884	+8.479	17
17	GTLM	911	(United States) Porsche GT Team	(France) Patrick Pilet	1:43.140	+8.735	18
18	GTLM	4	(United States) Corvette Racing	(United States) Tommy Milner	1:43.189	+8.784	19
19	GTLM	912	(United States) Porsche GT Team	(Belgium) Laurens Vanthoor	1:43.192	+8.787	20
20	GTLM	3	(United States) Corvette Racing	(Spain) Antonio García	1:43.243	+8.838	21
21	PC	26	(United States) BAR1 Motorsports	(United States) Brian Alder	1:43.575	+9.170	13^{1}
22	**GTD**	**93**	**(United States) Michael Shank Racing with Curb-Agajanian**	**(United States) Andy Lally**	**1:46.051**	**+11.646**	22 ‡
23	GTD	57	(United States) Stevenson Motorsports	(United States) Lawson Aschenbach	1:46.271	+11.866	23
24	GTD	15	(United States) 3GT Racing	(United Kingdom) Jack Hawksworth	1:46.724	+12.319	24
25	GTD	86	(United States) Michael Shank Racing with Curb-Agajanian	(United States) Jeff Segal	1:46.816	+12.411	25
26	GTD	27	(United States) Dream Racing Motorsport	(Italy) Paolo Ruberti	1:47.490	+13.085	26
27	GTD	96	(United States) Turner Motorsport	(United States) Justin Marks	1:47.551	+13.146	27
28	GTD	16	(United States) Change Racing	(United States) Corey Lewis	1:47.774	+13.369	28
29	GTD	48	(United States) Paul Miller Racing	(United States) Madison Snow	1:47.826	+13.421	29
30	GTD	14	(United States) 3GT Racing	(United States) Sage Karam	1:48.058	+13.653	38^{2}
31	GTD	63	(United States) Scuderia Corsa	(Denmark) Christina Nielsen	1:48.098	+13.693	30
32	GTD	33	(United States) Riley Motorsports – Team AMG	(United States) Ben Keating	1:48.282	+13.877	31
33	GTD	75	(Australia) SunEnergy1 Racing	(United States) Boris Said	1:48.778	+14.373	32
34	GTD	73	(United States) Park Place Motorsports	(United States) Matt McMurry	1:48.895	+14.490	33
35	GTD	28	(United States) Alegra Motorsports	(United States) Michael de Quesada	1:49.131	+14.726	34
36	GTD	50	(United States) Riley Motorsports – WeatherTech Racing	(United States) Cooper MacNeil	1:49.878	+15.474	35
37	GTD	23	(United States) Alex Job Racing	(United States) Townsend Bell	1:50.647	+16.242	36
38	GTD	54	(United States) CORE Autosport	(United States) Jon Bennett	1:50.973	+16.568	37^{3}
Sources:

- ^{1} The No. 26 BAR1 Motorsports entry was moved to the back of the PC field as per Articles 43.5 and 43.6 of the Sporting regulations (Change of starting driver) and (Change of starting tires).
- ^{2} The No. 14 3GT Racing entry was moved to the back of the GTD field as per Article 43.6 of the Sporting regulations (Change of starting tires).
- ^{3} The No. 54 CORE Autosport entry was moved to the back of the GTD field as per Article 43.6 of the Sporting regulations (Change of starting tires).

== Race ==
=== Post-race ===
The result kept Jordan Taylor and Ricky Taylor atop the Prototype Drivers' Championship. Goikhberg and Simpson moved to third after being fourth coming into Watkins Glen. In the PC Drivers' Championship, French and O'Ward extended their points lead to thirty points over Yount, while Yacamán advanced from seventh to fifth. In the GTLM Drivers' Championship, Garcia and Magnussen further increased their gap to eighteen points ahead of Müller and Hand. Auberlen and Sims advanced from fourth to third while Pilet and Werner dropped to fifth. By finishing second in GTD, Balzan and Nielsen took the lead of the GTD Drivers' Championship while Lally and Legge moved from sixth to third. Cadillac, Chevrolet, and Mercedes-AMG continued to top their respective Manufacturers' Championships, while Wayne Taylor Racing, Performance Tech Motorsports, and Corvette Racing kept their respective advantages in the Teams' Championships with six rounds remaining. Scuderia Corsa took the lead of the GTD Teams' Championship going into the next race at Canadian Tire Motorsports Park.

== Results ==
Class winners are denoted in bold and ‡.

Final race classification
Pos	Class	No.	Team	Drivers	Chassis	Tire	Laps	Time/Retired
Pos	Class	No.	Team	Drivers	Engine	Tire	Laps	Time/Retired
1	**P**	**5**	**(United States) Mustang Sampling Racing**	**(Brazil) Christian Fittipaldi (Portugal) João Barbosa (Portugal) Filipe Albuquerque**	**Cadillac DPi-V.R**	C	**200**	**6:01:18.592‡**
1	**P**	**5**	**(United States) Mustang Sampling Racing**	**(Brazil) Christian Fittipaldi (Portugal) João Barbosa (Portugal) Filipe Albuquerque**	**Cadillac 6.2 L V8**	C	**200**	**6:01:18.592‡**
2	P	85	(United States) JDC-Miller Motorsports	(Canada) Misha Goikhberg (South Africa) Stephen Simpson (United States) Chris Miller	Oreca 07	C	200	+1.183s
2	P	85	(United States) JDC-Miller Motorsports	(Canada) Misha Goikhberg (South Africa) Stephen Simpson (United States) Chris Miller	Gibson GK428 4.2 L V8	C	200	+1.183s
3	P	55	(Japan) Mazda Motorsports	(United States) Tristan Nunez (United States) Jonathan Bomarito (United States) Spencer Pigot	Mazda RT24-P	C	200	+8.546s
3	P	55	(Japan) Mazda Motorsports	(United States) Tristan Nunez (United States) Jonathan Bomarito (United States) Spencer Pigot	Mazda MZ-2.0T 2.0 L Turbo I4	C	200	+8.546s
4	P	52	(United States) PR1/Mathiasen Motorsports	(France) Olivier Pla (Mexico) José Gutiérrez	Ligier JS P217	C	200	+17.583s
4	P	52	(United States) PR1/Mathiasen Motorsports	(France) Olivier Pla (Mexico) José Gutiérrez	Gibson GK428 4.2 L V8	C	200	+17.583s
5	P	90	(United States) VisitFlorida Racing	(Belgium) Marc Goossens (Netherlands) Renger van der Zande	Riley Mk. 30	C	198	+2 laps
5	P	90	(United States) VisitFlorida Racing	(Belgium) Marc Goossens (Netherlands) Renger van der Zande	Gibson GK428 4.2 L V8	C	198	+2 laps
6	P	10	(United States) Wayne Taylor Racing	(United States) Ricky Taylor (United States) Jordan Taylor	Cadillac DPi-V.R	C	197	+3 laps
6	P	10	(United States) Wayne Taylor Racing	(United States) Ricky Taylor (United States) Jordan Taylor	Cadillac 6.2 L V8	C	197	+3 laps
7	**PC**	**38**	**(United States) Performance Tech Motorsports**	**(United States) James French (Mexico) Patricio O'Ward (United States) Kyle Masson**	**Oreca FLM09**	C	**195**	**+5 laps‡**
7	**PC**	**38**	**(United States) Performance Tech Motorsports**	**(United States) James French (Mexico) Patricio O'Ward (United States) Kyle Masson**	**Chevrolet 6.2 L V8**	C	**195**	**+5 laps‡**
8	**GTLM**	**25**	**(United States) BMW RLL Racing**	**(United Kingdom) Alexander Sims (United States) Bill Auberlen**	**BMW M6 GTLM**	MI	**192**	**+8 laps‡**
8	**GTLM**	**25**	**(United States) BMW RLL Racing**	**(United Kingdom) Alexander Sims (United States) Bill Auberlen**	**BMW 4.4 L Turbo V8**	MI	**192**	**+8 laps‡**
9	GTLM	67	(United States) Ford Chip Ganassi	(United Kingdom) Richard Westbrook (Australia) Ryan Briscoe	Ford GT	MI	192	+8 laps
9	GTLM	67	(United States) Ford Chip Ganassi	(United Kingdom) Richard Westbrook (Australia) Ryan Briscoe	Ford EcoBoost 3.5 L Twin-turbo V6	MI	192	+8 laps
10	GTLM	3	(United States) Corvette Racing	(Spain) Antonio García (Denmark) Jan Magnussen	Chevrolet Corvette C7.R	MI	192	+8 laps
10	GTLM	3	(United States) Corvette Racing	(Spain) Antonio García (Denmark) Jan Magnussen	Chevrolet LT5.5 5.5 L V8	MI	192	+8 laps
11	PC	20	(United States) BAR1 Motorsports	(United States) Don Yount (Canada) Daniel Burkett (United States) Buddy Rice	Oreca FLM09	C	192	+8 laps
11	PC	20	(United States) BAR1 Motorsports	(United States) Don Yount (Canada) Daniel Burkett (United States) Buddy Rice	Chevrolet 6.2 L V8	C	192	+8 laps
12	GTLM	66	(United States) Ford Chip Ganassi Racing	(United States) Joey Hand (Germany) Dirk Müller	Ford GT	MI	192	+8 laps
12	GTLM	66	(United States) Ford Chip Ganassi Racing	(United States) Joey Hand (Germany) Dirk Müller	Ford EcoBoost 3.5 L Twin-turbo V6	MI	192	+8 laps
13	GTLM	4	(United States) Corvette Racing	(United States) Tommy Milner (United Kingdom) Oliver Gavin	Chevrolet Corvette C7.R	MI	192	+8 laps
13	GTLM	4	(United States) Corvette Racing	(United States) Tommy Milner (United Kingdom) Oliver Gavin	Chevrolet LT5.5 5.5 L V8	MI	192	+8 laps
14	GTLM	912	(United States) Porsche GT Team	(Belgium) Laurens Vanthoor (Italy) Gianmaria Bruni	Porsche 911 RSR	MI	192	+8 laps
14	GTLM	912	(United States) Porsche GT Team	(Belgium) Laurens Vanthoor (Italy) Gianmaria Bruni	Porsche 4.0 L Flat-6	MI	192	+8 laps
15	GTLM	911	(United States) Porsche GT Team	(France) Patrick Pilet (Germany) Dirk Werner	Porsche 911 RSR	MI	191	+9 laps
15	GTLM	911	(United States) Porsche GT Team	(France) Patrick Pilet (Germany) Dirk Werner	Porsche 4.0 L Flat-6	MI	191	+9 laps
16 DNF	P	31	(United States) Whelen Engineering Racing	(United States) Eric Curran (United States) Dane Cameron (Portugal) Filipe Albuquerque	Cadillac DPi-V.R	C	190	DNF
16 DNF	P	31	(United States) Whelen Engineering Racing	(United States) Eric Curran (United States) Dane Cameron (Portugal) Filipe Albuquerque	Cadillac 6.2 L V8	C	190	DNF
17	**GTD**	**93**	**(United States) Meyer-Shank Racing with Curb-Agajanian**	**(United States) Andy Lally (United Kingdom) Katherine Legge**	**Acura NSX GT3**	C	**187**	**+13 laps‡**
17	**GTD**	**93**	**(United States) Meyer-Shank Racing with Curb-Agajanian**	**(United States) Andy Lally (United Kingdom) Katherine Legge**	**Acura 3.5L V6 Turbo**	C	**187**	**+13 laps‡**
18	GTD	63	(United States) Scuderia Corsa	(Denmark) Christina Nielsen (Italy) Alessandro Balzan (Italy) Matteo Cressoni	Ferrari 488 GT3	C	187	+13 laps
18	GTD	63	(United States) Scuderia Corsa	(Denmark) Christina Nielsen (Italy) Alessandro Balzan (Italy) Matteo Cressoni	Ferrari F154CB 3.9 L Turbo V8	C	187	+13 laps
19	GTD	96	(United States) Turner Motorsport	(United States) Justin Marks (Germany) Jens Klingmann	BMW M6 GT3	C	187	+13 laps
19	GTD	96	(United States) Turner Motorsport	(United States) Justin Marks (Germany) Jens Klingmann	BMW 4.4L Turbo V8	C	187	+13 laps
20	GTD	50	(United States) Riley Motorsports - Team AMG	(United States) Cooper MacNeil (New Zealand) Shane van Gisbergen (United States) Gunnar Jeannette	Mercedes-AMG GT	C	187	+13 laps
20	GTD	50	(United States) Riley Motorsports - Team AMG	(United States) Cooper MacNeil (New Zealand) Shane van Gisbergen (United States) Gunnar Jeannette	Mercedes AMG M159 6.2 L V8	C	187	+13 laps
21	GTD	15	(United States) 3GT Racing	(United Kingdom) Jack Hawksworth (United States) Austin Cindric (United States) Robert Alon	Lexus RC F GT3	C	187	+13 laps
21	GTD	15	(United States) 3GT Racing	(United Kingdom) Jack Hawksworth (United States) Austin Cindric (United States) Robert Alon	Lexus 5.0L V8	C	187	+13 laps
22	GTD	14	(United States) 3GT Racing	(United States) Sage Karam (United States) Scott Pruett	Lexus RC F GT3	C	187	+13 laps
22	GTD	14	(United States) 3GT Racing	(United States) Sage Karam (United States) Scott Pruett	Lexus 5.0L V8	C	187	+13 laps
23	GTD	28	(United States) Alegra Motorsports	(United States) Michael de Quesada (Denmark) Michael Christensen (Canada) Daniel Morad	Porsche 911 GT3 R	C	187	+13 laps
23	GTD	28	(United States) Alegra Motorsports	(United States) Michael de Quesada (Denmark) Michael Christensen (Canada) Daniel Morad	Porsche 4.0 L Flat-6	C	187	+13 laps
24	GTD	73	(United States) Park Place Motorsports	(United States) Matt McMurry (United States) Patrick Lindsey	Porsche 911 GT3 R	C	187	+13 laps
24	GTD	73	(United States) Park Place Motorsports	(United States) Matt McMurry (United States) Patrick Lindsey	Porsche 4.0 L Flat-6	C	187	+13 laps
25	GTD	57	(United States) Stevenson Motorsports	(United States) Lawson Aschenbach (United States) Andrew Davis	Audi R8 LMS	C	186	+14 laps
25	GTD	57	(United States) Stevenson Motorsports	(United States) Lawson Aschenbach (United States) Andrew Davis	Audi 5.2 L V10	C	186	+14 laps
26	GTD	33	(United States) Riley Motorsports - Team AMG	(United States) Ben Keating (Netherlands) Jeroen Bleekemolen (Germany) Mario Farnbacher	Mercedes-AMG GT	C	186	+14 laps
26	GTD	33	(United States) Riley Motorsports - Team AMG	(United States) Ben Keating (Netherlands) Jeroen Bleekemolen (Germany) Mario Farnbacher	Mercedes AMG M159 6.2 L V8	C	186	+14 laps
27	GTD	27	(United States) Dream Racing Motorsport	(Italy) Paolo Ruberti (Monaco) Cédric Sbirrazzuoli	Lamborghini Huracán GT3	C	186	+14 laps
27	GTD	27	(United States) Dream Racing Motorsport	(Italy) Paolo Ruberti (Monaco) Cédric Sbirrazzuoli	Lamborghini 5.2 L V10	C	186	+14 laps
28	GTD	48	(United States) Paul Miller Racing	(United States) Madison Snow (United States) Bryan Sellers	Lamborghini Huracán GT3	C	186	+14 laps
28	GTD	48	(United States) Paul Miller Racing	(United States) Madison Snow (United States) Bryan Sellers	Lamborghini 5.2 L V10	C	186	+14 laps
29	GTD	54	(United States) CORE Autosport	(United States) Jon Bennett (United States) Colin Braun (Sweden) Niclas Jönsson	Porsche 911 GT3 R	C	186	+14 laps
29	GTD	54	(United States) CORE Autosport	(United States) Jon Bennett (United States) Colin Braun (Sweden) Niclas Jönsson	Porsche 4.0 L Flat-6	C	186	+14 laps
30	GTD	23	(United States) Alex Job Racing	(United States) Townsend Bell (United States) Frankie Montecalvo (United States) Bill Sweedler	Audi R8 LMS	C	184	+16 laps
30	GTD	23	(United States) Alex Job Racing	(United States) Townsend Bell (United States) Frankie Montecalvo (United States) Bill Sweedler	Audi 5.2 L V10	C	184	+16 laps
31	GTD	75	(Australia) SunEnergy1 Racing	(United States) Boris Said (Australia) Kenny Habul (France) Tristan Vautier	Mercedes-AMG GT3	C	184	+16 laps
31	GTD	75	(Australia) SunEnergy1 Racing	(United States) Boris Said (Australia) Kenny Habul (France) Tristan Vautier	Mercedes AMG M159 6.2 L V8	C	184	+16 laps
32 DNF	P	2	(United States) Tequila Patron ESM	(Brazil) Pipo Derani (United Kingdom) Ryan Dalziel (United States) Scott Sharp	Nissan Onroak DPi	C	177	Throttle
32 DNF	P	2	(United States) Tequila Patron ESM	(Brazil) Pipo Derani (United Kingdom) Ryan Dalziel (United States) Scott Sharp	Nissan VR38DETT 3.8 L Turbo V6	C	177	Throttle
33	PC	26	(United States) BAR1 Motorsports	(Colombia) Gustavo Yacamán (United States) Derek Jones (United States) Brian Alder	Oreca FLM09	C	176	+24 laps
33	PC	26	(United States) BAR1 Motorsports	(Colombia) Gustavo Yacamán (United States) Derek Jones (United States) Brian Alder	Chevrolet 6.2 L V8	C	176	+24 laps
34 DNF	GTD	86	(United States) Meyer-Shank Racing with Curb-Agajanian	(United States) Jeff Segal (Brazil) Oswaldo Negri Jr.	Acura NSX GT3	C	167	Hub
34 DNF	GTD	86	(United States) Meyer-Shank Racing with Curb-Agajanian	(United States) Jeff Segal (Brazil) Oswaldo Negri Jr.	Acura 3.5L V6 Turbo	C	167	Hub
35 DNF	GTLM	24	(United States) BMW Team RLL	(Germany) Martin Tomczyk (United States) John Edwards	BMW M6 GTLM	MI	161	Radiator
35 DNF	GTLM	24	(United States) BMW Team RLL	(Germany) Martin Tomczyk (United States) John Edwards	BMW 4.4 L Turbo V8	MI	161	Radiator
36 DNF	P	22	(United States) Tequila Patron ESM	(United States) Johannes van Overbeek (Brazil) Bruno Senna	Nissan Onroak DPi	C	160	Oil Pressure
36 DNF	P	22	(United States) Tequila Patron ESM	(United States) Johannes van Overbeek (Brazil) Bruno Senna	Nissan VR38DETT 3.8 L Turbo V6	C	160	Oil Pressure
37 DNF	GTD	16	(United States) Change Racing	(United States) Corey Lewis (Netherlands) Jeroen Mul (United States) Brett Sandberg	Lamborghini Huracán GT3	C	89	Crash
37 DNF	GTD	16	(United States) Change Racing	(United States) Corey Lewis (Netherlands) Jeroen Mul (United States) Brett Sandberg	Lamborghini 5.2 L V10	C	89	Crash
38 DNF	P	70	(Japan) Mazda Motorsports	(United States) Joel Miller (United Kingdom) Marino Franchitti (United States) Tom Long	Mazda RT24-P	C	61	Turbo
38 DNF	P	70	(Japan) Mazda Motorsports	(United States) Joel Miller (United Kingdom) Marino Franchitti (United States) Tom Long	Mazda MZ-2.0T 2.0 L Turbo I4	C	61	Turbo

Tyre manufacturers
Key
Symbol	Tyre manufacturer
**C**	Continental
**MI**	Michelin

== Statistics ==
Fastest Lap - #52 Oliper Pla - 1:33.314

== Standings after the race ==
Prototype Drivers' Championship standings
Pos.	+/–	Driver	Points
1		(United States) Jordan Taylor (United States) Ricky Taylor	202
2		(Portugal) João Barbosa (Brazil) Christian Fittipaldi	182
3	1	(Canada) Misha Goikhberg (South Africa) Stephen Simpson	167
4	1	(United States) Dane Cameron (United States) Eric Curran	164
5		(United Kingdom) Ryan Dalziel (United States) Scott Sharp	153

PC Drivers' Championship standings
Pos.	+/–	Driver	Points
1		(United States) James French (Mexico) Patricio O'Ward	180
2		(United States) Don Yount	150
3		(United States) Buddy Rice	120
4		(United States) Kyle Masson	108
5	2	(Colombia) Gustavo Yacamán	89

GTLM Drivers' Championship standings
Pos.	+/–	Driver	Points
1		(Spain) Antonio García (Denmark) Jan Magnussen	154
2		(United States) Joey Hand (Germany) Dirk Müller	146
3	1	(United States) Bill Auberlen (United Kingdom) Alexander Sims	144
4	1	(Australia) Ryan Briscoe (United Kingdom) Richard Westbrook	139
5	2	(France) Patrick Pilet (Germany) Dirk Werner	134

GTD Drivers' Championship standings
Pos.	+/–	Driver	Points
1	1	(Italy) Alessandro Balzan (Denmark) Christina Nielsen	173
2	1	(Netherlands) Jeroen Bleekemolen (United States) Ben Keating	171
3	3	(United States) Andy Lally (United Kingdom) Katherine Legge	147
4		(Canada) Daniel Morad	146
5	2	(United States) Bryan Sellers (United States) Madison Snow	142

- Note: Only the top five positions are included for all sets of standings.

Prototype Teams' Championship standings
Pos.	+/–	Team	Points
1		(United States) #10 Wayne Taylor Racing	202
2		(United States) #5 Mustang Sampling Racing	182
3	1	(United States) #85 JDC-Miller MotorSports	167
4	1	(United States) #31 Whelen Engineering Racing	164
5		(United States) #2 Tequila Patrón ESM	153

PC Teams' Championship standings
Pos.	+/–	Team	Points
1		(United States) #38 Performance Tech Motorsports	180
2		(United States) #26 BAR1 Motorsports	155
3		(United States) #20 BAR1 Motorsports	150
4		(United States) #8 Starworks Motorsport	58
5		(United States) #88 Starworks Motorsport	28

GTLM Teams' Championship standings
Pos.	+/–	Team	Points
1		(United States) #3 Corvette Racing	154
2		(United States) #66 Ford Chip Ganassi Racing	146
3	1	(United States) #25 BMW Team RLL	144
4	1	(United States) #67 Ford Chip Ganassi Racing	139
5	2	(United States) #911 Porsche GT Team	134

GTD Teams' Championship standings
Pos.	+/–	Team	Points
1	1	(United States) #63 Scuderia Corsa	173
2	1	(United States) #33 Riley Motorsports Team AMG	171
3	3	(United States) #93 Michael Shank Racing with Curb-Agajanian	147
4		(United States) #28 Alegra Motorsports	146
5	2	(United States) #48 Paul Miller Racing	142

- Note: Only the top five positions are included for all sets of standings.

Prototype Manufacturers' Championship standings
Pos.	+/–	Manufacturer	Points
1		(United States) Cadillac	210
2		(Japan) Nissan	186
3		(Japan) Mazda	186

GTLM Manufacturers' Championship standings
Pos.	+/–	Manufacturer	Points
1		(United States) Chevrolet	163
2		(United States) Ford	159
3	1	(Germany) BMW	149
4	1	(Germany) Porsche	146
5		(Italy) Ferrari	112

GTD Manufacturers' Championship standing
Pos.	+/–	Manufacturer	Points
1		(Germany) Mercedes-AMG	187
2		(Italy) Ferrari	182
3	2	(Japan) Acura	172
4	1	(Germany) Porsche	167
5	1	(Italy) Lamborghini	162

- Note: Only the top five positions are included for all sets of standings.

IMSA SportsCar Championship
Previous race: 2017 Chevrolet Sports Car Classic	2017 season	Next race: 2017 Mobil 1 SportsCar Grand Prix
