= 2015 Formula Lites season =

2015 Formula Lites

Seasons
- ← none none →

The 2015 Formula Lites season was the inaugural and only season of the Formula Lites series, an open wheel motor racing championship powered by Honda and sanctioned by the Sports Car Club of America (SCCA). It began on 30 May at the Thompson Speedway in Thompson, Connecticut and ended on 20 September at the MSR Houston in Angleton, Texas, after six double-header rounds.

After this inaugural season, SCCA Pro Racing ended the series.

== Teams and competitors ==
Team	No.	Drivers	Rounds
BW Racing	2	(United States) Jason Bell	1–10
BW Racing	2	(United States) John Alfonso	11–12
BW Racing	17	(United States) Nick Neri	1–8
Howard Motorsports	4	(United States) Spencer Brockman	1–6
Howard Motorsports	4	(United States) Cameron Das	7–8
Group A Racing	7	(Mexico) José Armida	All
Group A Racing	86	(China) Jackie Ding	All
JDX Racing	28	(Brazil) Vinicius Papareli	All
Silver Arrow Racing	44	(United States) Robert Boileau	5–6

== Race calendar and results ==
Round	Circuit	Location	Date	Pole position	Fastest lap	Winning driver
1	Thompson Speedway RC	(United States) Thompson, Connecticut	30 May	(Brazil) Vinicius Papareli	(Brazil) Vinicius Papareli	(United States) Nick Neri
2	Thompson Speedway RC	(United States) Thompson, Connecticut	30 May		(Brazil) Vinicius Papareli	(Brazil) Vinicius Papareli
3	New Jersey Motorsports Park	(United States) Millville, New Jersey	14 June	(Brazil) Vinicius Papareli	(Brazil) Vinicius Papareli	(Brazil) Vinicius Papareli
4	New Jersey Motorsports Park	(United States) Millville, New Jersey	14 June		(Brazil) Vinicius Papareli	(Brazil) Vinicius Papareli
5	Virginia International Raceway	(United States) Alton, Virginia	25 July	(Brazil) Vinicius Papareli	(Brazil) Vinicius Papareli	(China) Jackie Ding
6	Virginia International Raceway	(United States) Alton, Virginia	25 July		(Brazil) Vinicius Papareli	(United States) Nick Neri
7	Carolina Motorsports Park	(United States) Kershaw, South Carolina	16 August	(Brazil) Vinicius Papareli	(Brazil) Vinicius Papareli	(Brazil) Vinicius Papareli
8	Carolina Motorsports Park	(United States) Kershaw, South Carolina	16 August		(Brazil) Vinicius Papareli	(Brazil) Vinicius Papareli
9	Pikes Peak International Raceway	(United States) Fountain, Colorado	5 September	(Brazil) Vinicius Papareli	(Brazil) Vinicius Papareli	(Brazil) Vinicius Papareli
10	Pikes Peak International Raceway	(United States) Fountain, Colorado	5 September		(Brazil) Vinicius Papareli	(Brazil) Vinicius Papareli
11	MSR Houston	(United States) Angleton, Texas	20 September	(Mexico) José Armida	(Brazil) Vinicius Papareli	(Brazil) Vinicius Papareli
12	MSR Houston	(United States) Angleton, Texas	20 September		(Brazil) Vinicius Papareli	(Mexico) José Armida

=== Drivers' championship ===
Scoring system

Position	**1st**	**2nd**	**3rd**	**4th**	**5th**	**6th**	**7th**	**8th**	**9th**	**10th**	**11th**	**12th**
Points	25	18	15	12	10	8	6	5	4	3	2	1

- The driver who qualifies on pole is awarded two additional points.
- An additional point is awarded to each driver who leads a lap in a race.

Pos	Driver	TSMP		NJMP		VIR		CMP		PPIR		MSRH		Pts
1	(Brazil) Vinicius Papareli	**2***	1*	**1***	1*	**7***	5	**1***	1*	**1***	1*	1*	2	272
2	(Mexico) José Armida	4	2	6	4	2	2	3	3	3	3*	**2***	1*	194
3	(China) Jackie Ding	3	6	3	2	1*	7	2	2*	2	2	3	3*	192
4	(United States) Nick Neri	1*	3	2	5*	4	1*	4	6					128
5	(United States) Jason Bell	5	5	5	6	5	4	6	4	4	4*			105
6	(United States) Spencer Brockman	6	4	4	3	3	3							77
7	(United States) John Alfonso											4	4	24
8	(United States) Cameron Das							5	5					20
9	(United States) Robert Boileau					6	6							16
Pos	Driver	TSMP		NJMP		VIR		CMP		PPIR		MSRH		Pts

Colour	Result
Gold	Winner
Silver	Second place
Bronze	Third place
Green	Points classification
Blue	Non-points classification
Blue	Non-classified finish (NC)
Purple	Retired, not classified (Ret)
Red	Did not qualify (DNQ)
Red	Did not pre-qualify (DNPQ)
Black	Disqualified (DSQ)
White	Did not start (DNS)
White	Withdrew (WD)
White	Race cancelled (C)
Blank	Did not practice (DNP)
Blank	Did not arrive (DNA)
Blank	Excluded (EX)

**In-line notation**
**Bold**	Pole position (1 point)
*	Led a lap (1 point)
Italics	Ran fastest race lap (no points)

- Ties in points broken by number of wins, or best finishes.
