= Formula Lites =

Single-Seater Racing Championship

- Category: Open wheeled
- Country: United States
- Inaugural season: 2015
- Folded: 2016
- Constructors: Crawford Composites
- Engine suppliers: Honda
- Tyre suppliers: P
- Official website: Formula Lites

The Formula Lites series was a single-seater formula racing class launched for 2015. The series was sanctioned by SCCA Pro Racing.

== History ==
The High Performance Group and Crawford Composites announced the creation of the Formula Lites Series in 2014. Dane Cameron debuted the car at Virginia International Raceway during the 2014 Ultimate Track Car Challenge.

The first race of the Formula Lites Series was run at the Thompson Speedway Road Course. Driver Nick Neri won the inaugural event.

The series saw only six entries at every race during its initial season. The 2016 schedule was announced but no races occurred, ending the series.

== Car ==
The drivers all used the spec car, the Crawford FL-15, designed and constructed by Crawford Composites. The Crawford FL15 has a carbon fiber monocoque chassis built according to FIA F3 technical regulations. The car is powered by a 2.4 L Honda powerplant. The 2.4 L Honda K24 engine will be built by Honda Performance Development. The racing class was announced with the unveiling of the car at the North American Motorsports Expo.

== Champions ==
Year	Champion
2015	(Brazil) Vinicius Papareli

== See also ==
- Formula Three
- United States Formula Three Championship
- F3 Americas Championship
