= 2014 Atlantic Championship =

2014 Atlantic Championship Series season

Season
- Races: 10
- Start date: April 12
- End date: August 31

Awards
- Drivers' champion: (Canada) Daniel Burkett

The 2014 Atlantic Championship Series season was the second season of the revived Atlantic Championship. The series was organised by Formula Race Promotions under the sanctioning of SCCA Pro Racing. This will be the first ever season the Atlantic Championship visits the Thompson Speedway Road Course.

== Drivers and teams ==
Team	No.	Drivers	Chassis	Engine
(United States) Atlantic Creations	96	(United States) Theodoros Zorbas	Swift 014.a	Toyota 4AGE
(United States) Atlantic Pro-Team	82	(United States) Matt Miller	Swift 016.a	Mazda-Cosworth MZR
(United States) Comprent Motorsports	17	(United States) Bob Corliss	Swift 014.a	Toyota 4AGE
(United States) Comprent Motorsports	27	(United States) Jimmy Simpson	Swift 016.a	Mazda-Cosworth MZR
(United States) Comprent Motorsports	66	(United States) Richard Zober	Swift 016.a	Mazda-Cosworth MZR
(United States) COMPREP	82	(United States) Matt Miller	Swift 016.a	Mazda-Cosworth MZR
(United States) Everclear Motorsports	75	(United States) Sedat Yelkin	Swift 008.a	Toyota 4AGE
(United States) Fahan Racing	39	(United States) Chris Fahan	Swift 016.a	Mazda-Cosworth MZR
(United States) Front Range Motorsports	11	(United States) Dwight Rider	Ralt RT41	Toyota 4AGE
(United States) K-Hill Motorsports	3	(United States) Mark Sherwood	Ralt RT41	Toyota 4AGE
(United States) K-Hill Motorsports	4	(Canada) Daniel Burkett	Swift 016.a	Mazda-Cosworth MZR
(United States) K-Hill Motorsports	5	(United States) Bruce Crockett	Swift 014.a	Toyota 4AGE
(United States) K-Hill Motorsports	56	(United States) Conner Kearby	Swift 016.a	Mazda-Cosworth MZR
(United States) K-Hill Motorsports	69	(United States) Gaston Kearby	Swift 016.a	Mazda-Cosworth MZR
(United States) K-Hill Motorsports	34	(United States) Andy Schaufelberger	Swift 016.a	Mazda-Cosworth YDX
(United States) K-Hill Motorsports	74	(United States) Brian Pickering	Swift 014.a	Toyota 4AGE
(United States) K-Hill Motorsports	06	(United States) Bruce Hamilton	Swift 016.a	Mazda-Cosworth MZR
(United States) Lochmoor Promotions	70	(United States) Lewis Cooper, Jr.	Swift 014.a	Toyota 4AGE
(United States) One Formula Racing	49	(United States) Ethan Ringel	Swift 016.a	Mazda-Cosworth MZR
(United States) Pabst Racing Services	09	(United States) J. R. Smart	Swift 014.a	Toyota 4AGE
(United States) Polestar Racing Group	40	(United States) Keith Grant	Swift 016.a	Mazda-Cosworth MZR
(United States) Swan Racing	2	(United States) Mark Felsen	Swift 014.a	Toyota 4AGE
(United States) Swan Racing	22	(United States) Tyler Hunter	Swift 014.a	Toyota 4AGE
(United States) Swan Racing	71	(United States) Michael Mällinen	Swift 016.a	Mazda-Cosworth MZR

== Race calendar and results ==
Round	Circuit	Location	Date	Pole position	Fastest lap	Winning driver
1	(Georgia (U.S. state)) Road Atlanta	(United States) Braselton, Georgia	April 12	(Canada) Daniel Burkett	(Canada) Daniel Burkett	(Canada) Daniel Burkett
2	(Georgia (U.S. state)) Road Atlanta	(United States) Braselton, Georgia	April 13	(Canada) Daniel Burkett	(Canada) Daniel Burkett	(Canada) Daniel Burkett
3	(New York (state)) Watkins Glen International	(United States) Watkins Glen, New York	May 17	(Canada) Daniel Burkett	(Canada) Daniel Burkett	(Canada) Daniel Burkett
4	(New York (state)) Watkins Glen International	(United States) Watkins Glen, New York	May 18	(United States) Jimmy Simpson	(United States) Jimmy Simpson	(Canada) Daniel Burkett
5	Virginia International Raceway	(United States) Alton, Virginia	June 7	(United States) Jimmy Simpson	(United States) Jimmy Simpson	(United States) Jimmy Simpson
6	Virginia International Raceway	(United States) Alton, Virginia	June 8	(Canada) Daniel Burkett	(United States) Jimmy Simpson	(Canada) Daniel Burkett
7	Mid-Ohio Sports Car Course	(United States) Lexington, Ohio	July 5	(Canada) Daniel Burkett	(Canada) Daniel Burkett	(United States) Jimmy Simpson
8	Mid-Ohio Sports Car Course	(United States) Lexington, Ohio	July 6	(Canada) Daniel Burkett	(Canada) Daniel Burkett	(Canada) Daniel Burkett
9	(Connecticut) Thompson Speedway Road Course	(United States) Thompson, Connecticut	August 30	(Canada) Daniel Burkett	(United States) Ethan Ringel	(United States) Ethan Ringel
10	(Connecticut) Thompson Speedway Road Course	(United States) Thompson, Connecticut	August 31	(Canada) Daniel Burkett	(Canada) Daniel Burkett	(Canada) Daniel Burkett

== Championship standings ==
Pos	Driver	(Georgia (U.S. state)) ATL		(New York (state)) WGL		(Virginia) VIR		(Ohio) MOH		(Connecticut) TOM		Points
1	(Canada) Daniel Burkett	**1**	**1**	**1**	1	17	**1**	**3**	**1**	**3**	**1**	462
2	(United States) Jimmy Simpson	2	5	6	**2**	**1**	2	1	3			340
3	(United States) Keith Grant	3	3	4	9	4	3	4	4	4	3	318
4	(United States) Conner Kearby	4	2	5	4	2	7	16	6	2	4	315
4	(United States) Ethan Ringel	13	4	2	3	15	15	2	2	1	2	315
6	(United States) Gaston Kearby	5	7	7	5	3	6	6	7	7	8	265
7	(United States) Matt Miller	6	6	3	20	5	4	5	5			223
8	(United States) Tyler Hunter	10	10	8	7	13	8	8	9			182
9	(United States) Bruce Hamilton	9	9	11	10	10				5	5	169
10	(United States) Richard Zober	8	15	9	8	6	9	9	15			160
11	(United States) Michael Mällinen	7	8	12	19	7	5	12	18			146
12	(United States) Dwight Rider	12	12	14	12	11	12	11	12			144
12	(United States) J. R. Smart	15	13	19	15	12	13	15	13	8	7	144
14	(United States) Bruce Crockett	11	11	22	DNS	9	10	17	17	9	9	117
15	(United States) Conner Burke					8	16	10	16	10	6	107
16	(United States) John Burke					14	11	18	11	6	10	82
17	(United States) Bob Corliss	14	14	21		16	14	13	12			77
18	(United States) Lewis Cooper, Jr.			15	13			7	10			74
19	(United States) Sedat Yelkin			10	6							50
20	(United States) Mark Felsen			20	16			14	14			42
21	(United States) Chris Fahan			13	11							34
22	(United States) Andy Schaufelberger			17	14							22
23	(United States) Brian Pickering			16	17							19
24	(United States) Mark Sherwood			18	18							16
Pos	Driver	(Georgia (U.S. state)) ATL		(New York (state)) WGL		(Virginia) VIR		(Ohio) MOH		(Connecticut) TOM		Points

Color	Result
Gold	Winner
Silver	2nd place
Bronze	3rd place
Green	4th & 5th place
Light Blue	6th–10th place
Dark Blue	Finished (Outside Top 10)
Purple	Did not finish
Red	Did not qualify (DNQ)
Brown	Withdrawn (Wth)
Black	Disqualified (DSQ)
White	Did not start (DNS)
Blank	Did not participate (DNP)
Blank	Not competing

**In-line notation**
**Bold**	Pole position (3 points)
Italics	Ran fastest race lap (2 points)

This list only contains drivers who registered for the championship.

== See also ==
- 2014 F1600 Championship Series season
- 2014 F2000 Championship Series season
