= 2009 Atlantic Championship =

2009 Atlantic Championship season
- Cooper Tires Presents the Atlantic Championship Powered by Mazda

Season
- Races: 12
- Start date: March 20
- End date: October 11

Awards
- Drivers' champion: (United States) John Edwards

The 2009 IMSA Cooper Tires Atlantic Championship season was the thirty-sixth Atlantic Championship season. It was the first full season of the Championship under the sanctioning of the International Motor Sports Association. After a three-way title battle into the final round at Mazda Raceway Laguna Seca, John Edwards became the series' youngest champion, beating Jonathan Summerton on a tie-breaker, after both drivers finished on 182 points. They also finished tied on four victories, but Edwards broke the tie with four second-place finishes compared to Summerton's three.

After that season, the category lost IMSA support, and the series went on hiatus for two years, returning in 2012. However, from that point on, the category's relevance—in terms of serving as a potential breeding ground for future IndyCar drivers—diminished drastically.

== Drivers and teams ==
The following teams and drivers competed in the 2009 Atlantic Championship. All teams are using the Swift 016.a chassis powered by a Mazda-Cosworth MZR 2.3-litre inline-4 engine and Cooper tires. C2 Class teams use the Swift 014.a chassis.

Team	No	Drivers	Rounds
(United States) Newman Wachs Racing	1	(Finland) Markus Niemelä	1–4
(United States) Newman Wachs Racing	34	(United States) Jonathan Summerton	5–12
(United States) Newman Wachs Racing	36	(United States) John Edwards	All
(Canada) Jensen MotorSport	1	(Finland) Markus Niemela	6–12
(Canada) Jensen MotorSport	2	(United States) Matt Lee	1
(Canada) Jensen MotorSport	2	(United Kingdom) James Winslow	2
(Canada) Jensen MotorSport	2	(Mexico) David Garza	3–4
(Canada) Jensen MotorSport	2	(United States) Barrett Mertins	12
(Canada) Jensen MotorSport	3	(United States) Michael Nacol	1–7
(Canada) Jensen MotorSport	3	(Canada) Eric Jensen	9–10
(Canada) Jensen MotorSport	13	(Canada) Eric Jensen	7
(United States) Condor Motorsports	6	(Spain) Borja García	1–10
(United States) Condor Motorsports	6	(Belgium) Frédéric Vervisch	12
(United States) Condor Motorsports	7	(France) Max Lefèvre	All
(United States) Conquest Racing	12	(United Kingdom) James Winslow	1
(United States) Conquest Racing	12	(United States) Matt Lee	5
(United States) Conquest Racing	21	(Latvia) Harald Schlegelmilch	1
(United States) Genoa Racing	17	(Belgium) Frédéric Vervisch	All
(United States) Genoa Racing	18	(Estonia) Tõnis Kasemets	2
(United States) Genoa Racing	18	(Canada) Robert Wickens	10
(United States) Genoa Racing	18	(United Kingdom) Greg Mansell	11
(United States) Genoa Racing	18	(United Kingdom) James Winslow	3–4, 9–10
(United States) Genoa Racing	19	(United Kingdom) James Winslow	5–7, 11
(United States) Genoa Racing	19	(United States) Jonathan Summerton	1–4
(United States) Mathiasen Motorsports	26	(United States) Jonathan Bomarito	1
(United States) Polestar Motor Racing	35	(Estonia) Tõnis Kasemets	1, 3–12
(United States) Polestar Motor Racing	66	(United States) Richard Zober	3–5
(United States) Paladin Motorsports	45	(United Kingdom) James Winslow	12
(United States) Team Stargate Worlds	77	(United States) Frankie Muniz	1-9
(United States) Team Stargate Worlds	77	(United States) Jonathan Bomarito	11–12
(United States) Team Stargate Worlds	78	(Switzerland) Simona de Silvestro	All
C2 Class
(United States) Swan Racing	29	(Turkey) Ahsen Yelkin	1
(United States) Swan Racing	68	(United States) Chris Lee	1
(United States) Swan Racing	71	(United States) Michael Mällinen	1–4, 8
(United States) Swan Racing	75	(Turkey) Sadat Yelkin	1
(United States) Swan Racing	80	(United States) Hans Peter	8
(United States) Swan Racing	88	(United States) Mirl Swan	1, 8

== Schedule ==
Round	Race date	Race name	Circuit	City/Location
1	March 20	(United States) Mobil 1 12 Hours of Sebring	Sebring International Raceway	Sebring, Florida
2	May 17	(United States) Larry H. Miller Dealerships Utah Grand Prix	Miller Motorsports Park	Tooele, Utah
3	June 13	(United States) Mazda Formula X	New Jersey Motorsports Park	Millville, New Jersey
4	June 14	(United States) Mazda Formula X	New Jersey Motorsports Park	Millville, New Jersey
5	July 18	(United States) Northeast Grand Prix	Lime Rock Park	Lakeville, Connecticut
6	July 25	(United States) Autobahn Grand Prix	Autobahn Country Club	Joliet, Illinois
7	July 26	(United States) Autobahn Grand Prix	Autobahn Country Club	Joliet, Illinois
8	August 8	(United States) Acura Sports Car Challenge of Mid-Ohio	Mid-Ohio Sports Car Course	Lexington, Ohio
9	August 16	(Canada) Grand Prix de Trois-Rivières	Circuit Trois-Rivières	Trois-Rivières, Quebec
10	August 30	(Canada) Grand Prix of Mosport	Mosport International Raceway	Bowmanville, Ontario
11	September 26	(United States) Petit Le Mans	Road Atlanta	Braselton, Georgia
12	October 11	(United States) Monterey Sports Car Championships	Mazda Raceway Laguna Seca	Monterey, California

Seven rounds are held jointly with the American Le Mans Series: Sebring, Miller, Lime Rock, Mid-Ohio, Mosport, Road Atlanta and Laguna Seca.

The series planned to open its season on a road course on Hutchinson Island in Savannah, Georgia, on March 15. The race was postponed until 2010, as further work on the track was required before it could be homologated for professional open wheel racing. A second race at New Jersey Motorsports Park and Autobahn Country Club were added instead.

== Race results ==
Rd	Race track	Pole Position	Fastest Lap	Most Laps Led	Race winner	
Rd	Race track	Pole Position	Fastest Lap	Most Laps Led	Driver	Team
1	Sebring International Raceway	(United States) Jonathan Summerton	(United States) John Edwards	(United States) John Edwards	(United States) John Edwards	(United States) Newman Wachs Racing
2	Miller Motorsports Park	(Switzerland) Simona de Silvestro	(Switzerland) Simona de Silvestro	(Switzerland) Simona de Silvestro	(Switzerland) Simona de Silvestro	(United States) Team Stargate Worlds
3	New Jersey Motorsports Park	(United States) Jonathan Summerton	(United States) Jonathan Summerton	(United States) Jonathan Summerton	(United States) Jonathan Summerton	(United States) Genoa Racing
4	New Jersey Motorsports Park	(Switzerland) Simona de Silvestro	(Finland) Markus Niemelä	(Switzerland) Simona de Silvestro	(Switzerland) Simona de Silvestro	(United States) Team Stargate Worlds
5	Lime Rock Park	(Switzerland) Simona de Silvestro	(United States) John Edwards	(Switzerland) Simona de Silvestro	(Switzerland) Simona de Silvestro	(United States) Team Stargate Worlds
6	Autobahn Country Club	(United States) John Edwards	(United States) Jonathan Summerton	(United States) John Edwards	(United States) John Edwards	(United States) Newman Wachs Racing
7	Autobahn Country Club	(United States) John Edwards	(United States) John Edwards	(United States) John Edwards	(United States) John Edwards	(United States) Newman Wachs Racing
8	Mid-Ohio Sports Car Course	(United States) Jonathan Summerton	(United States) Jonathan Summerton	(United States) Jonathan Summerton	(United States) Jonathan Summerton	(United States) Newman Wachs Racing
9	Circuit Trois-Rivières	(Switzerland) Simona de Silvestro	(United States) Jonathan Summerton	(Switzerland) Simona de Silvestro	(Switzerland) Simona de Silvestro	(United States) Team Stargate Worlds
10	Mosport International Raceway	(United States) Jonathan Summerton	(United States) John Edwards	(United States) Jonathan Summerton	(United States) Jonathan Summerton	(United States) Newman Wachs Racing
11	Road Atlanta	(United States) Jonathan Summerton	(United States) Jonathan Summerton	(United States) Jonathan Summerton	(United States) Jonathan Summerton	(United States) Newman Wachs Racing
12	Mazda Raceway Laguna Seca	(United States) John Edwards	(United States) Jonathan Summerton	(United States) John Edwards	(United States) John Edwards	(United States) Newman Wachs Racing

== Championship Standings ==
The point system was modified from previous years for the 2009 season. Points are awarded as follows:

Pos	1	2	3	4	5	6	7	8	9	10	11	12	13
Points	20	16	14	12	10	8	7	6	5	4	3	2	1

- Bonus points will also be awarded for the fastest driver in a qualifying session (10 races will have two sessions), and most places gained during the race.
- This means the maximum a driver can score is 21, as a driver cannot earn the most places gained point, if they've started from pole.
- Only the driver's best eleven scores will count towards the championship.

=== Atlantic Class ===
Pos	Driver	SEB (United States)	MIL (United States)	NJ1 (United States)	NJ2 (United States)	LRP (United States)	ACC1 (United States)	ACC2 (United States)	MID (United States)	CTR (Canada)	MOS (Canada)	ATL (United States)	LAG (United States)	Points
1	(United States) John Edwards	1	2	5	6	2	**1**	**1**	9	2	2	3	**1**	182
2	(United States) Jonathan Summerton	**3**	6	**1**	2	4	2	11	**1**	3	**1**	**1**	2	182
3	(Switzerland) Simona de Silvestro	5	**1**	2	**1**	**1**	3	2	2	**1**	10	2	10	176
4	(Belgium) Frédéric Vervisch	2	3	7	3	6	4	4	5	9	3	6	3	131
5	(Estonia) Tõnis Kasemets	7	5	6	7	5	5	3	10	4	6	9	4	103
6	(Finland) Markus Niemelä	12	9	4	4	9	10	6	4	5	5	5	5	98
7	(Spain) Borja García	6	DSQ	3	5	3	6	5	3	11	7			88
8	(United Kingdom) James Winslow	8	8	9	9	7	8	9	6	7		7	7	72
9	(United States) Frankie Muniz	10	4	8	8	10	7	7	8	6				62
10	(France) Max Lefèvre	DNS	7	11	11	8	9	8	7	10	8	8	9	58
11	(United States) Jonathan Bomarito	13										4	8	19
12	(Canada) Eric Jensen							10		8	9			16
13	(Latvia) Harald Schlegelmilch	4												12
14	(Canada) Robert Wickens										4			12
15	(United States) Michael Nacol	11	10	13	13	12	DNS	DNS						11
16	(United States) Barrett Mertins												6	8
17	(Mexico) David Garza			10	10									8
18	(United States) Richard Zober			12	12	11								7
19	(United States) Matt Lee	9				13								6
20	(United Kingdom) Greg Mansell											10		4
Pos	Driver	SEB (United States)	MIL (United States)	NJ1 (United States)	NJ2 (United States)	LRP (United States)	ACC1 (United States)	ACC2 (United States)	MID (United States)	CTR (Canada)	MOS (Canada)	ATL (United States)	LAG (United States)	Points

Color	Result
Gold	Winner
Silver	2nd place
Bronze	3rd place
Green	4th & 5th place
Light Blue	6th–10th place
Dark Blue	11th place or lower
Purple	Did not finish
Red	Did not qualify (DNQ)
Brown	Withdrawn (Wth)
Black	Disqualified (DSQ)
White	Did not start (DNS)
Blank	Did not participate (DNP)
Blank	Driver replacement (Rpl)
Blank	Injured (Inj)
Blank	No race held (NH)

=== C2 Class ===
Pos	Driver	SEB (United States)	MIL (United States)	NJ1 (United States)	NJ2 (United States)	LRP (United States)	ACC1 (United States)	ACC2 (United States)	MID (United States)	CTR (Canada)	MOS (Canada)	ATL (United States)	LAG (United States)	Points
1	(United States) Michael Mällinen	5	**1**	**1**	**1**				1					93
2	(United States) Mirl Swan	**1**							DNQ					21
3	(United States) Hans Peter								**2**					17
4	(Turkey) Sadat Yelkin	2												16
5	(Turkey) Ahsen Yelkin	3												14
6	(United States) Chris Lee	4												12
Pos	Driver	SEB (United States)	MIL (United States)	NJ1 (United States)	NJ2 (United States)	LRP (United States)	ACC1 (United States)	ACC2 (United States)	MID (United States)	CTR (Canada)	MOS (Canada)	ATL (United States)	LAG (United States)	Points

- Polesitters are denoted in **bold**. Polesitters are determined by the fastest overall lap in qualifying, and one point is awarded at each round.
- Driver in italics has gained the most places in a round. One point is awarded at each round.

=== Notes ===
- At round one, no hard charger point was awarded in the C2 Class as no drivers changed positions over the 19-lap duration. This also occurred at rounds two, three and four, but on these occasions due to only one car taking part.

== Television and other video ==
For the 2009 season, a new Atlantic Championship high-definition television package was announced on HDNet, which features live coverage of certain events, and replays of others.

Web video of events has also historically been available on the series website, and the series also has its own official YouTube channel under the username "AtlanticRacingSeries."
