= 944 Cup =

Motorsports racing series

944 Cup logo

The 944 Cup was a grassroots motorsports road racing series dedicated to the front-engine water-cooled Porsche 944. The race series was created as a standalone series which began operating as such within numerous sanctioning bodies. The series was founded by the current National Director, Dave Derecola, and his son Chris Derecola, who continue to own and operate the series. The series was sold to the Porsche Club of America in 2023.

In addition to providing for Regional Championships, the series held its inaugural National Championship in September 2006 and a subsequent one in every year following up to and including 2022. The yearly event invited all 944 Cup racers to compete on the same track over the course of 2–3 days to crown a National Champion.

== Classes ==
The series includes 3 classes: Spec, Cup and Super Cup for the front-engine water cooled Porsches, including the various models of the 924S, 944, 944S, 944S2, 951, 951T and the 968. The Spec and Cup Class is designed for normally aspirated eight (8) valve front-engined Porsches. The Super Cup Class is designed primarily for higher horsepower cars such as the sixteen (16) valve normally aspirated and turbo equipped front-engine Porsches.

== History ==
The 944 Cup started with one class for normally aspirated / 8 valve 944s in 2002 at a race at Summit Point on June 22 with 16 racers entered. The race was held with NASA but as an independently owned and operated race series. The series had 6 rounds of racing that year. Designed as a place to race for nearly all front-engine Porsches, the series added a second class in 2004, Super Cup, for the more powerful 944s.

Having raced for 20 seasons, the series hosted more than 500 individual races with over 2,500 racer entries. Along the way, it has visited tracks including Virginia International Raceway, Mid-Ohio Sports Car Course, Watkins Glen International Raceway and Daytona International Raceway. To create a safe and well-organized racing environment, the 944 Cup has partnered with many clubs and sanctioning bodies, including World Challenge, PCA, SCCA Club Racing, SCCA Pro Racing, Brian Redman's Intercontinental Events, Rennsport Reunion, Calabogie Motor Club, Autobahn Motor Club, NASCAR of Canada, NASA and EMRA.

The 944 Cup now races all of its events with the Porsche Club of America. The first contact from PCA with the series regarding the prospect of adding 944 Cup classes for the club was in late 2005. As a result, PCA added two Cup classes in 2006: the SP2 representing the 944 Cup class and SP3 representing the 944 Super Cup class. The series Cup officially split from its original partner club NASA in 2008, when NASA decided to move their Nationals to Utah.

Several other series have developed directly out of the Cup series by former Cup directors, including NASA's 944 Spec, NASA's GTS and the 944 Canada Challenge. The series currently is celebrated on the 944 Cup. The Archives Facebook page.
