= Nick Neri =

American racing driver (born 1995)

Nick Rayce Neri
- Nationality: (United States) American
- Born: December 5, 1995 (age 30) Palmetto, Florida, U.S.

Previous series
- 2015 2001-2014 2012 2011-12: Formula Lites; Karting; Atlantic Championship; Formula Skip Barber

Nick Neri (born December 5, 1995, in Palmetto, Florida) is an American racing driver. Neri has won various karting championships and competed in auto racing championships. As of 2022, he has participated in 24 races and won five of them.

== Career ==
=== Karting ===
Neri started karting when he was six years old at Tri-City Kart Club in Pinellas Park, Florida. After three consecutive Kid Karts class championships, Neri moved to the World Karting Association Florida Championship Series where he won 10 championships in the Florida Championships Series between 2003 and 2006.

In 2006, Neri won his first national World Karting Association title, winning the HPV Sportsman title. He also won races in the Florida Winter Tour and Stars of Karting championships. Neri raced in various karting classes including JICA and different Rotax Max classes. In 2012, Neri was selected by Tony Kart as one of their factory drivers. After Neri took a second place in the Superkarts! USA Super Nationals in the Pro Stock Honda class, he was given the opportunity to test a Global Rallycross Lights car.

=== Formula car racing ===
Neri made his debut in formula car racing in 2011. At Road Atlanta, He won the first race he participated in. The Florida native raced in the Formula Skip Barber Winter Series. He went on to win two more races at Mazda Raceway Laguna Seca. Neri finished third in the championship standings, behind champion Jake Eidson and second placed driver Danilo Estrela. Following this, Neri was selected by Honda Performance Development to run a Honda powered Atlantic Championship car at Summit Point Motorsports Park. He was not able to set a qualifying time in his debut Atlantics outing as he broke a wheel. Technical difficulties prevented Neri from finishing the first race and not being able to start the second race. He made a comeback in formula racing in 2015, as he started in the new Formula Lites class.

=== Stock car racing ===
Neri also has experience in stock car racing. He ran his first stock car race at Citrus County Speedway in 2012, winning four races during the season. The following year, Neri won one race at Auburndale Speedway and competed in the Florida United Promoters Late Model Series. In 2014, he ran partial seasons at DeSoto Speedway and Showtime Speedway in the Super Late Model division, scoring a total of four top ten finishes.

== Racing record ==
=== American open–wheel racing results ===
(key)

==== Atlantic Championship ====
Year	Team	1	2	3	4	5	6	Rank	Points
2012	Primus Racing	ATL1	ATL2	NJ1	NJ2	SUM1; DNF	SUM2; DNS	21st	1
