= Ethan Ringel =

American racing driver (born 1994)

Ethan Robert Ringel
- Born: August 12, 1994 (age 32) Windermere, Florida, U.S.

Atlantic Championship career
- Current team: One Formula Racing
- Car number: 49

Previous series
- 2014 2013 2012 2011 2011: Atlantic Championship; Indy Lights; GP3 Series; F2000 Championship Series; Formula Enterprise

Ethan R. Ringel (born August 12, 1994 in Windermere, Florida, United States) is an American racing driver. He competed in the 2012 GP3 Series season for Atech CRS Grand Prix. Ringel is coached by Indy Car driver Jay Howard.

== Career ==
Ringel's kart racing career began in 2008, when he took part in the Rotax Max Challenge USA Junior Max Grand Nationals Presented by Mazda, finishing 29th in only his second karting race . The following year, which was his first full year of karting, Ringel competed in the 2009 Rotax Grand Nationals of the United States and placed 2nd and had the fastest time by three tenths, grabbing his first World Finals Ticket . In 2010 in his second and, last full year of karting he once again won a ticket to represent USA in the world finals by winning two tickets. One from the USA nationals and also in the Rotax Pan-Am Championship.

Ringel transferred to auto racing in 2011, taking part in the F2000 Championship Series and various Formula Enterprise races. He took eight wins and broke a track record at Miller Motorsports Park, Tooele, Utah.

Ringel joined the GP3 Series in 2012, with a view to competing in Formula One. He did not score any points over the course of the season, and ended up in 29th in the Drivers' Championship standings.

2013 practice with Formula Atlantic with a full field of twenty FA cars at COTA. Ringel posted a time 7.7 seconds faster than the second quickest time, and 11.4 seconds quicker than last years national champion.

2013 GP3 pre season practice sector times showed Ringel with two quickest sectors but 11th overall . Team Atech sold. Ringel switches to Indy Lights.

2013 TMR, Indy Lights Homestead practice stopped with gear box failure. St Pete Race gear box issues persisted stopping race before start.

Ringel is currently unsigned. Scheduled for Mid Ohio test with Sam Schmidt Motorsports.

== Personal life ==
Ringel's parents are Glenn and Karen. He has two siblings: Alex and Lindy.

== Racing record ==
=== Career summary ===
Season	Series	Team	Races	Wins	Poles	F.L.	Podiums	Points	Position
2011	F2000 Championship Series	McLaughlin Motorsports	5	0	0	0	0	75	26th
2011	SARRC Formula Enterprises	One Formula Motorsports	2	2	2	2	2	N/A	NC
2011	SCCA Central Florida Region - Formula Enterprise	One Formula	2	2	2	0	2	N/A	NC
2011	SCCA Continental Divide Region - National - Formula Enterprise	One Formula Motorsports	2	2	2	2	2	39	**2nd**
2011	SCCA Milwaukee Region National - Formula Enterprise	One Formula Motorsports	2	2	2	0	0	N/A	NC
2011	SCCA National Championship Runoffs Formula Enterprises	Motorsports	1	0	0	0	0	N/A	NC
2011	SCCA Steel Cities Region National - Formula Enterprise	One Formula Motorsports	1	0	0	0	1	N/A	NC
2012	GP3 Series	Atech CRS Grand Prix	16	0	0	0	0	0	29th
2013	Indy Lights	Team Moore Racing	1	0	0	0	0	22	18th
2013	SCCA National Championship Runoffs - Formula Atlantic	One Formula Racing	1	0	0	0	0	N/A	5th
2014	Atlantic Championship	COMPREP	10	1	0	0	6	315	4th
2015	Indy Lights	Schmidt Peterson Motorsports	16	0	1	0	1	197	11th

=== SCCA National Championship Runoffs ===
Year	Track	Car	Engine	Class	Finish	Start	Status
2011	Road America	Van Diemen DP06	Mazda	Formula Enterprises	16	10	Running
2013	Road America	Swift 014a	Toyota	Formula Atlantic	5	7	Running

=== Complete GP3 Series results ===
(key) (Races in bold indicate pole position) (Races in italics indicate fastest lap)

Year	Entrant	1	2	3	4	5	6	7	8	9	10	11	12	13	14	15	16	D.C.	Points
2012	Atech CRS Grand Prix	CAT; FEA; Ret	CAT; SPR; 18	MON; FEA; Ret	MON; SPR; 18	VAL; FEA; 14	VAL; SPR; Ret	SIL; FEA; Ret	SIL; SPR; 17	HOC; FEA; 18	HOC; SPR; 16	HUN; FEA; 22	HUN; SPR; 17	SPA; FEA; 24	SPA; SPR; 22	MNZ; FEA; 18	MNZ; SPR; Ret	29th	0

=== Indy Lights ===
Year	Team	1	2	3	4	5	6	7	8	9	10	11	12	13	14	15	16	Rank	Points
2013	Team Moore Racing	STP; 9	ALA	LBH	INDY	MIL	IOW	POC	TOR	MOH	BAL	HOU	FON					**18th**	**22**
2015	Schmidt Peterson Motorsports	STP; 8	STP; 12	LBH; 7	ALA; 10	ALA; 9	IMS; 10	IMS; 10	**INDY**; 2	TOR; 6	TOR; 11	MIL; 10	IOW; 11	MOH; 12	MOH; 7	LAG; 10	LAG; 12	11th	197

=== Atlantic Championship Series ===
Year	Team	1	2	3	4	5	6	7	8	9	10	Rank	Points
2014	One Formula Racing	ATL; 13	ATL; 4	WGL; 2	WGL; 3	VIR; 15	VIR; 15	MOH; 2	MOH; 2	TOM; 1	TOM; 2	**4th**	**315**
