= Michael Mällinen =

American racing driver (born 1958)

Michael Mallinen
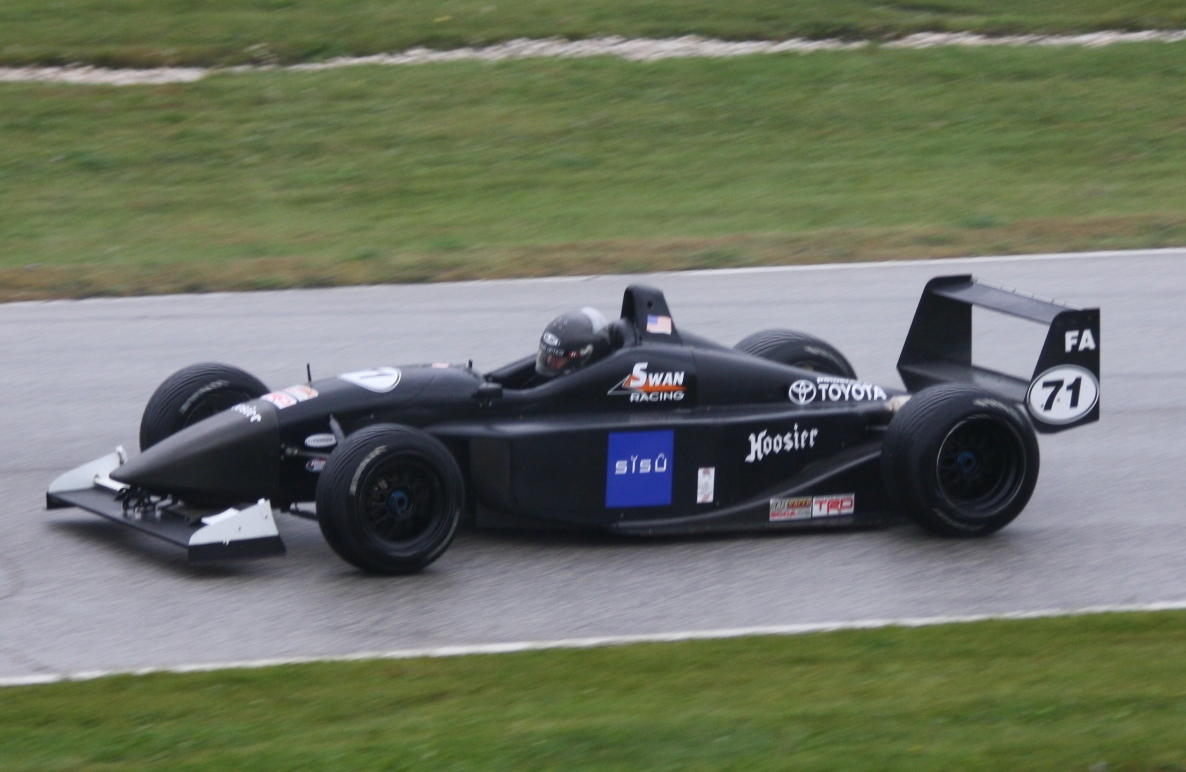
- Michael Mällinen winning the 2011 SCCA National Runoffs at Road America in Formula Atlantic
- Nationality: (United States) American
- Born: 4 March 1958 (age 68)

Championship titles
- 2011 2010 2009 2008: SCCA National Championship Runoffs; American Road Race of Champions; IMSA Atlantic Championship C2 class Formula Atlantic championship

Michael Mällinen (born March 4, 1958) is a racecar driver from the United States.

Mällinen raced in formula car and sports prototype series in IMSA, ALMS, Atlantic Championship, and SCCA. He won several US National titles and Championships in the Formula Atlantic series.

Mällinen had 65 starts with 18 wins, 36 podiums, ten poles, and ten fastest laps during his career.

== Career ==
Mällinen began his racing career in the 1990s driving Formula Ford and sports racers built by Lola cars in SCCA, Conference and endurance series.

In 2004, Mällinen won the SCCA C Sports Racer championship in the northeast division. Mällinen began racing Formula Atlantic in 2005. In 2006, he was the runner up in the Southeast SCCA Formula Atlantic championship driving a Ralt RT41. In 2007, he finished third in Formula Atlantic and made his debut in IMSA Lites in the L2 class driving a Stohr sports prototype. In 2008, Mällinen raced in the IMSA Lites L1 class driving an Élan Motorsport Technologies DP02 sports prototype and won the 2008 Formula Atlantic championship driving a Swift Engineering TRD 014.a for Swan Racing in the southeast division.

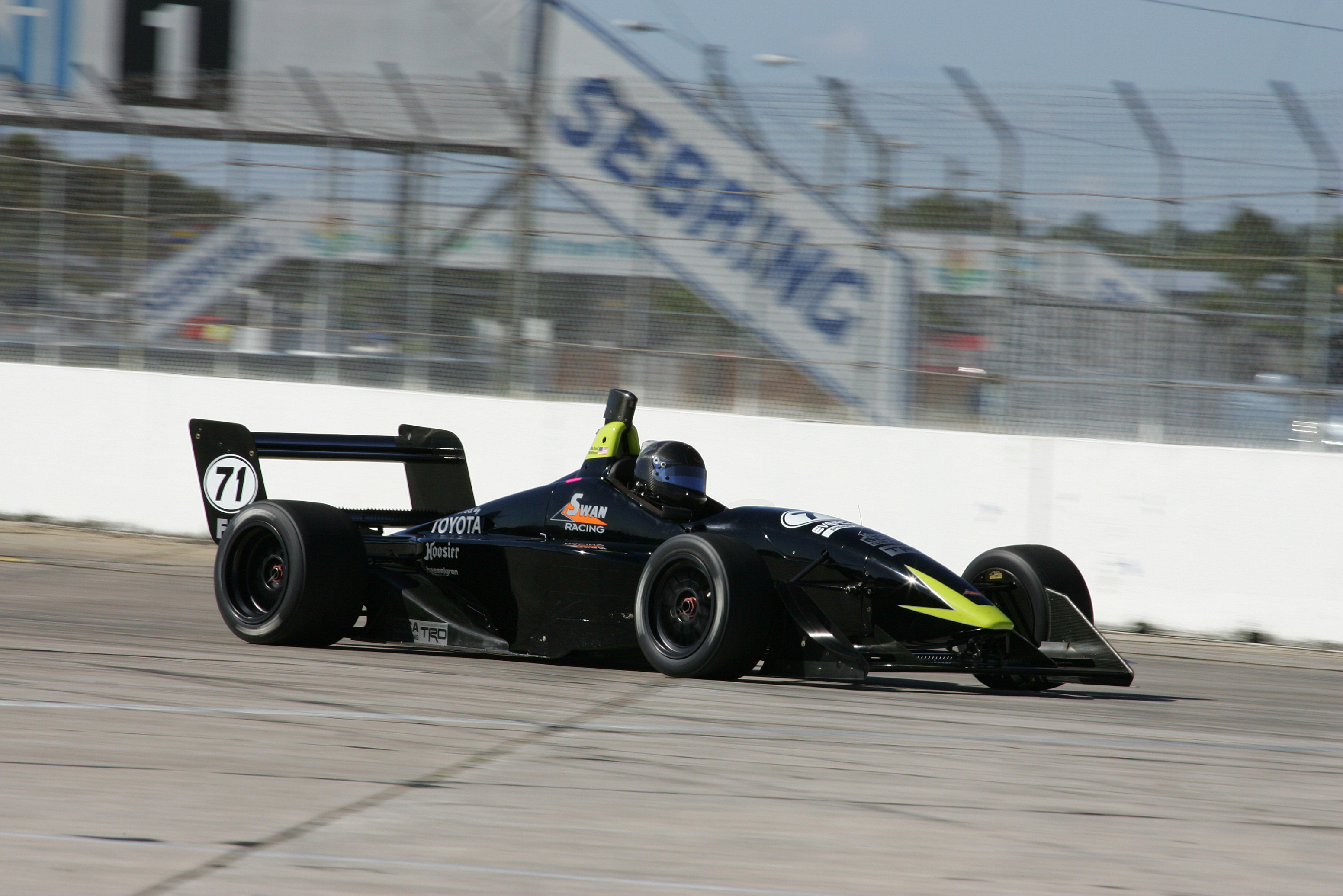
Michael Mällinen driving a Swift 014.a in the 2009 Atlantic Championship Series C2 race at Sebring

In 2009 Mällinen made his debut in the IMSA Atlantic Championship racing for Swan Racing and won the Championship (C2) with four wins and three pole positions. In 2010, Mällinen won the American Road Race of Champions, finished third in the SCCA Formula Atlantic national championship series and third in the SCCA National Championship Runoffs driving a Swift Engineering TRD 014.a for Swan Racing. In 2010, Mällinen won seven races and eight pole positions. In 2011, Mällinen won the 2011 US National Championship, SCCA National Championship Runoffs, Division Championship, June Sprints, and the Triple Crown. Mällinen was the recipient of the Sports Car Club of America's 2011 Super Sweep Award in recognition of winning the National Championship, National Championship Runoffs, Division Title and various other races in a single season. In 2012, Mällinen finished second in the SCCA National Championship Runoffs driving a Swift Engineering TRD 014.a for Swan Racing. In 2013, Mällinen finished third in the SCCA National Championship Runoffs driving a Swift Engineering Cosworth 016.a for Swan Racing.

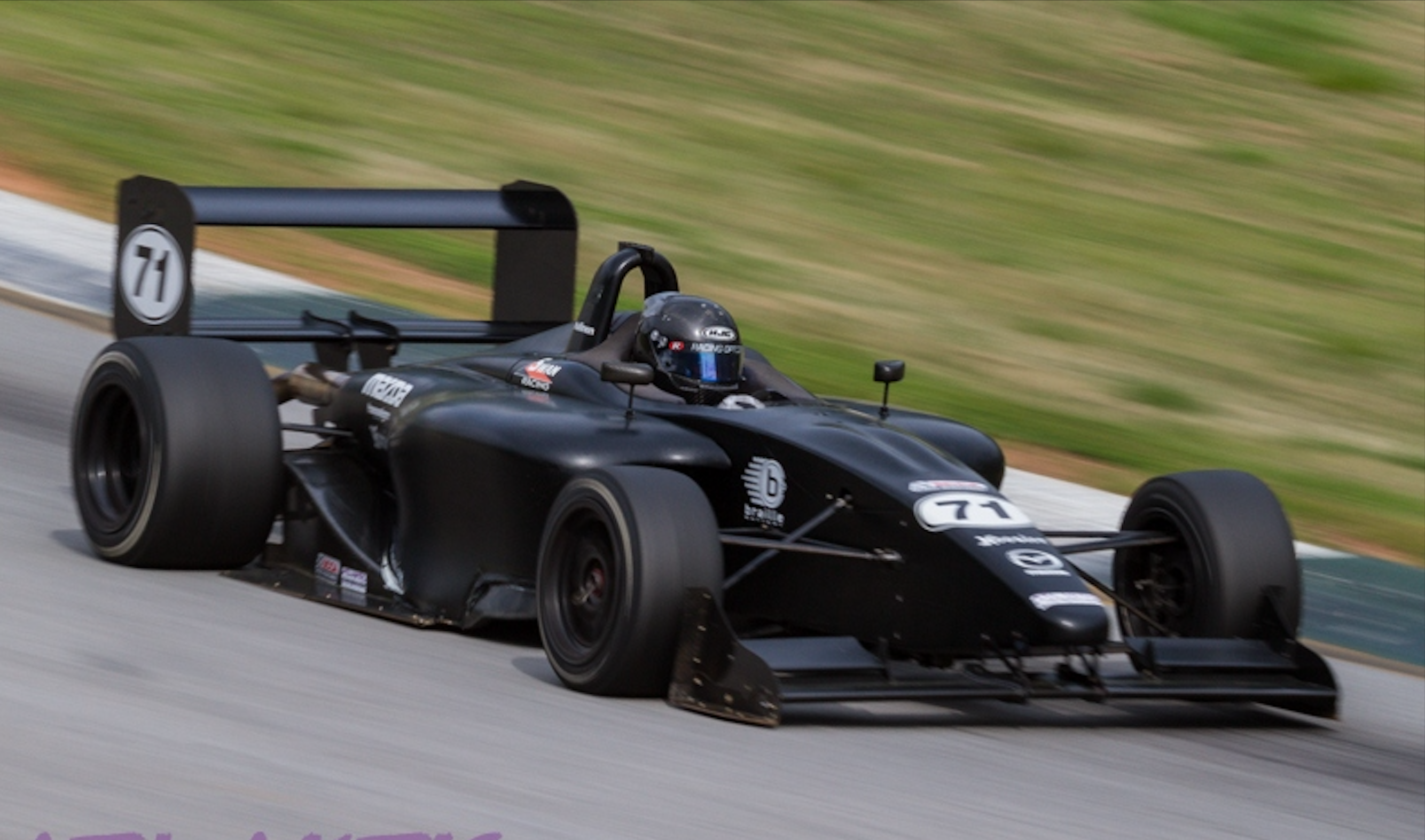
Michael Mällinen driving a Swift 016.a in the 2014 Atlantic Championship Series at Road Atlanta

In 2014 at Laguna Seca, Mällinen started from pole position and retired while leading the race due to a gearbox issue. And again, in 2015 at Daytona, Mällinen started from second and retired while leading with a mechanical issue. In 2020 at Road America, Mällinen finished sixth in the SCCA National Championship Runoffs driving a Swift Engineering TRD 016.a for Swan Racing.

== Racing record ==
=== SCCA National Championship Runoffs ===
Year	Track	Car	Engine	Class	Finish	Start	Status
2004	Mid-Ohio	Radical SR3	Suzuki	C Sports Racer	8	13	Running
2005	Mid-Ohio	Stohr 05CT	Suzuki	C Sports Racer	13	5	Retired
2006	Heartland Park	Ralt RT41	Toyota	Formula Atlantic	8	11	Retired
2007	Heartland Park	Ralt RT41	Toyota	Formula Atlantic	13	12	Retired
2008	Heartland Park	Swift 014.a	Toyota	Formula Atlantic	9	6	Retired
2010	Road America	Swift 014.a	Toyota	Formula Atlantic	3	3	Running
2011	Road America	Swift 014.a	Toyota	Formula Atlantic	1	1	Running
2012	Road America	Swift 014.a	Toyota	Formula Atlantic	2	3	Running
2013	Road America	Swift 016.a	Mazda-Cosworth	Formula Atlantic	3	3	Running
2014	Laguna Seca	Swift 016.a	Mazda-Cosworth	Formula Atlantic	11	1	Retired
2015	Daytona	Swift 016.a	Mazda-Cosworth	Formula Atlantic	10	2	Retired
2020	Road America	Swift 016.a	Mazda-Cosworth	Formula Atlantic	6	5	Running

=== American open–wheel racing results ===
(key)

==== Atlantic Championship ====
Year	Team	1	2	3	4	5	6	7	8	9	10	11	12	Rank	Points
2009	Swan Racing	SEB; 16	UTA; 10	NJ1; 14	NJ2; 14	LIM	ACC1	ACC2	MOH; 9	TRR	MOS	ATL	LS	N.C.	0
2009 C2	Swan Racing	SEB; 5	UTA; 1	NJ1; 1	NJ2; 1	LIM	ACC1	ACC2	MOH; 1	TRR	MOS	ATL	LS	1st	93
2014	Swan Racing	ATL1; 7	ATL2; 8	WGI1; 12	WGI2; 19	VIR1; 7	VIR2; 5	MOH1; 12	MOH2; 18	TOM1	TOM2			11th	160

=== American sports prototype racing results ===
(key)

==== IMSA Lites Championship ====
Year	Team	1	2	3	4	5	6	7	8	9	10	11	12	Rank	Points
2007	PVM Racing	SEB1	SEB2	MMP1; 4	MMP2; 4	LIM1	LIM2	MOS1	MOS2	ATL1	ATL2	LS1	LS2	9th	20
2008	Leslie Racing	SEB1; 12	SEB2; 14	MMP1	MMP2	LIM1	LIM2	MOS1; 12	MOS2; 11	ATL1	ATL2	LS1	LS2	20th	15
