= Daniel Burkett =

Canadian racing driver

- Nationality: (Canada) Canadian
- Born: February 25, 1995 (age 31) Winnipeg, Manitoba, Canada

IMSA Continental Tire Challenge GS career
- Debut season: 2016
- Current team: CJ Wilson Racing
- Categorisation: FIA Silver
- Car number: 33
- Starts: 10
- Championships: 0
- Wins: 1
- Poles: 2
- Fastest laps: 3
- Best finish: 1st in 2016 IMSA Continental Tire Challenge GS

Previous series
- 2015: Pro Mazda
- Statistics up to date as of June 5, 2017.

Daniel Burkett (born February 25, 1995) is a Canadian racing driver who competed in the Continental Tire Sports Car Challenge for CJ Wilson Racing.

== Career history ==
After karting in various series, Burkett made his open wheel debut in 2013. His first race was the opening round of the 2013 U.S. F2000 Winterfest. During the three races he finished fifteenth, seventeenth and thirteenth. He started in the regular USF2000 season for Belardi Auto Racing. After a rough start of the season, Burkett improved and was a regular top-ten finisher. His best result was a fifth-place finish at Mazda Raceway Laguna Seca. He finished fifteenth in the standings. During the 2014 Winterfest, Burkett returned to the series in the final round at Barber Motorsports Park. Burkett made his debut in the Atlantic Championship with K-Hill Motorsports in 2014. He swept the opening round at Road Atlanta winning both races. He also signed on to compete in a second season of U.S. F2000 with Belardi in 2014 which saw him improve to 11th in the standings with three fourth-place finishes. He signed with Cape Motorsports with Wayne Taylor Racing for the 2015 MRTI Pro Mazda series. In 2016, Burkett raced in the Continental Tire Sports Car Challenge with CJ Wilson Racing with Marc Miller as his co-driver. They drove the No. 33 Porsche GT4 Cayman Clubsport in the GS class. They finished third in the season opener at Daytona as a fuel issue held them back from victory.

In 2017, Burkett made his debut in the Indy Lights Series, finishing 16th in the championship standings.

Outside of racing, Burkett is a motorsports entrepreneur, founding RaceCoin. This platform aims to connect racing drivers with sponsors and fans.

== Racing record ==
=== U.S. F2000 National Championship ===
| Year | Team | 1 | 2 | 3 | 4 | 5 | 6 | 7 | 8 | 9 | 10 | 11 | 12 | 13 | 14 | Rank | Points |
|---|---|---|---|---|---|---|---|---|---|---|---|---|---|---|---|---|---|
| 2013 | Belardi Auto Racing | SEB; 22 | SEB; 28 | STP; 27 | STP; 14 | LOR; 9 | TOR; 10 | TOR; 11 | MOH; 13 | MOH; 21 | MOH; 25 | LAG; 10 | LAG; 5 | HOU; 9 | HOU; 8 | 15th | 106 |
| 2014 | Belardi Auto Racing | STP; 5 | STP; 11 | BAR; 4 | BAR; 4 | IMS; 10 | IMS; 12 | LOR; 12 | TOR; 9 | TOR; 8 | MOH; 6 | MOH; 20 | MOH; 4 | SNM; 20 | SNM; 21 | 11th | 147 |

=== Atlantic Championship Series ===
| Year | Team | 1 | 2 | 3 | 4 | 5 | 6 | 7 | 8 | 9 | 10 | Rank | Points |
|---|---|---|---|---|---|---|---|---|---|---|---|---|---|
| 2014 | K-Hill Motorsports | ATL1; 1 | ATL2; 1 | WGI1; 1 | WGI2; 1 | VIR1; 17 | VIR2; 1 | MOH1; 3 | MOH2; 1 | TOM1; 3 | TOM2; 1 | 1st | 462 |

=== Pro Mazda Championship ===
| Year | Team | 1 | 2 | 3 | 4 | 5 | 6 | 7 | 8 | 9 | 10 | 11 | 12 | 13 | 14 | 15 | 16 | 17 | Rank | Points |
|---|---|---|---|---|---|---|---|---|---|---|---|---|---|---|---|---|---|---|---|---|
| 2015 | Cape Motorsports Wayne Taylor Racing | STP; 14 | STP; 3 | LOU; 9 | LOU; C | BAR; 10 | BAR; 10 | IMS; 9 | IMS; 9 | IMS; 10 | LOR; 9 | TOR; 18 | TOR; 9 | IOW; 4 | MOH; 11 | MOH; 12 | LAG; 9 | LAG; 11 | 11th | 176 |
