= Max Lefèvre =

French racing driver (born 1985)

Max Lefèvre (born 9 December 1985), is a French racing driver from Paris.

After karting, Lefèvre moved up to car racing at the relatively late age of 21 winning the French Formula Ford. In 2008, he moved to Formula Renault 2.0 West European Cup and won the challenger cup. In 2009, he signed to race for Condor Motorsports in the Atlantic Championship, finishing tenth in the championship.
