= Thompson Speedway Motorsports Park =

Motorsport track in the United States

- Oval (1940–present)
- Location: 205 East Thompson Road; Thompson, Connecticut, United States
- Coordinates: 41.9817°N 71.8250°W
- Owner: Donald and D.R. Hoenig
- Operator: Donald and D.R. Hoenig
- Broke ground: 21 September 1938; 88 years ago
- Opened: 26 May 1940; 86 years ago
- Former names: Thompson International Speedway (1983–1997, 2000–2012); Thompson Speedway (1940–1952, 1972–1979, 1998–1999); Big Thompson Speedway (1980–1982); Thompson Raceway (1952–1971)
- Major events: Current: NASCAR Whelen Modified Tour (1985–2020, 2022–present); 24 Hours of Lemons (2015–present); Former: NASCAR K&N Pro Series East; King Cadillac GMC Throwback 100 (1988–1991, 1993–2009, 2017–2018); American Canadian Tour (1981–1982, 1984–1985, 2015–2019, 2021); Global Rallycross (2017); Formula Lites (2015); Atlantic Championship Series (2014); NASCAR Whelen Southern Modified Tour (2011–2012); X-1R Pro Cup (2001); NASCAR Grand National Series (1951, 1969–1970); SCCA Continental Championship (1968–1969)
- Website: thompsonspeedway.com

Oval (1940–present)
- Surface: Asphalt
- Length: 0.625 mi (1.006 km)
- Turns: 4
- Banking: 26°

Forth Road Course (2014–present)
- Surface: Asphalt
- Length: 1.700 mi (2.736 km)
- Turns: 11

First Road Course (1952-1956)
- Surface: Asphalt
- Length: 1.5 mi (2.4 km)

Second Road Course (1957-1967)
- Surface: Asphalt
- Length: 2.000 mi (3.219 km)
- Turns: 12

Third Road Course (1968-1976)
- Surface: Asphalt
- Length: 1.7 mi (2.7 km)
- Race lap record: 0:59.400 ( (United Kingdom) David Hobbs, Surtees TS5, 1969, F5000)

Thompson Speedway Motorsports Park (TSMP), formerly Thompson Speedway and Thompson International Speedway, is a motorsports park in Thompson, Connecticut, United States. It features a 0.625 mi (1.006 km) asphalt oval racetrack with 13,000 seats, and a 1.700 mi (2.736 km) road racing course. Once known as the "Indianapolis of the East", it was the first asphalt-paved racing oval track in the United States and is now under the American-Canadian Tour (ACT) and Pro All Star Series (PASS) banners.

Each year, Thompson hosts "The Sunoco World Series of Speedway Racing", a racing “festival” highlighted by the Monaco Modified Tri-Track Series and the NASCAR Whelen Modified Tour. This event frequently draws over 200 race cars in 10 separate divisions over three days. Thompson Speedway Motorsports Park had hosted the most ever races in the modern era of the NASCAR Whelen Modified Tour, with 161 races from 1985 to 2026.

The speedway also has hosted 3 NASCAR Cup Series races, one in 1951 and two between 1969 and 1970. The facility also had hosted 5 NASCAR North Tour events from 1981 to 1985 and 29 NASCAR K&N Pro Series East races, between 1988 and 2018.

== History ==
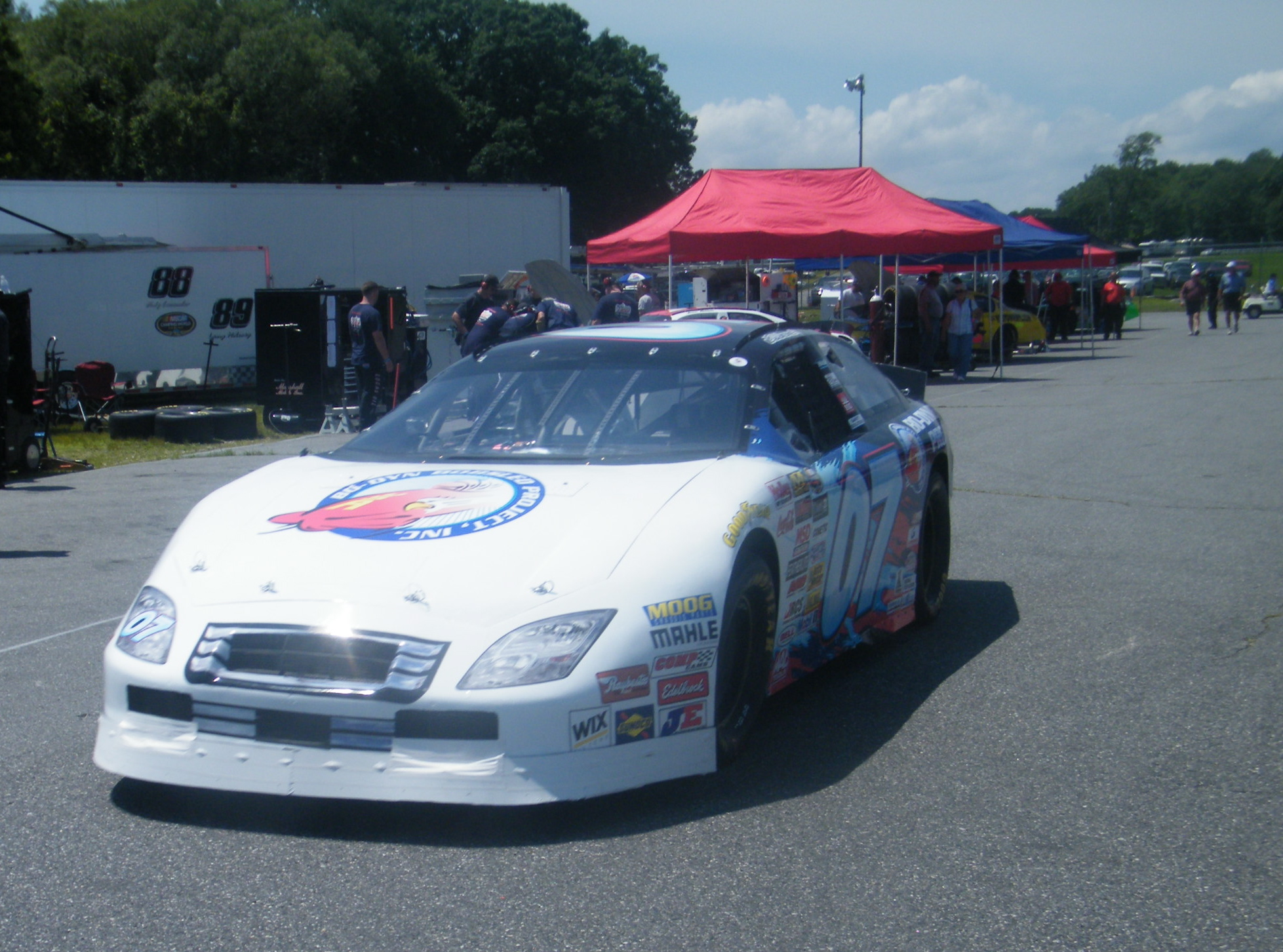
An East Series car at Thompson in 2009

Following cleanup from the hurricane of 1938, John Hoenig built a 0.625 mi (1.006 km) on his farmland in the northeast corner of Connecticut. The track operated in 1940 and 1941 before shutting down for the duration of World War II.

The track reopened after the war, and became an early venue for the Sports Car Club of America. In 1951, the SCCA held an event which used the larger 5/8 mile oval and the smaller 1/4 mile oval in combination to provide a road course of sorts (the two ovals shared the front straight; the inner oval was distinctly different from the one that appears on today's Oval map.)

In 1952, George Weaver leased property from John Hoenig, including the Oval, and built the first Thompson Road course, which operated under the name Thompson Raceways. Over the next several years, land to the south of the Hoenig property was acquired by friends and associates of Weaver's, including Briggs Cunningham, and in 1957 a 2 mile circuit debuted that was substantially different from the first circuit, using this land and parts of the first circuit. The second circuit opened on May 26th, 1957. This circuit operated until 1966.

At the end of 1966, Weaver and the Hoenigs failed to come to terms on a renewal of the lease of the Hoenig property, and Thompson Raceways closed on August 6th. In 1967, the Hoenigs opened a new road course on their property, New Thompson Speedway, which used parts of the original road course with a redesigned east end.

In the 1960s and 1970s, Thompson's Sunday night Oval Racing program was a who's who of modified greats such as Carl "Bugs" Stevens, Fred DeSarro, Fred Schulz, Ron Bouchard, Ed Flemke, Leo Cleary, Smoky Boutwell, and Geoff Bodine. During this period the track hosted memorable special events which drew legendary Southern drivers like Ray Hendrick in the famous "Fireball" #11 to battle the locals. Other surprise stars included Long Island's Fred Harbach and Rene Charland from Massachusetts.

In the late 1970s, the track drew 55 winged Super Modifieds to their World Series race. By owner's choice, all 55 started. During the energy crisis of the 1970s, Thompson hosted a unique division called the "Open Competitive" division which merged the Super Modifieds with the Modifieds. Later, Thompson tried a lower-cost stock-cylinder-head modified division, which chased away some of the tracks regulars. Until the 1980s the track had a unique barrier outside turns 1–2 and 3–4 made of dirt fill.

== Today ==
Hoenig's grandson D.R. and great-grandson Jonathan continue to operate the family-owned facility. As of June 1, 2013, the Hoenig family began work to reconstruct the 1.7-mile road course with and accompanying paddock and staging areas, and the website reflected the renaming of the facility to Thompson Speedway Motorsports Park. The newly rebuilt road course celebrated its "soft opening" with the New England Region of SCCA on the weekend of June 6–8, 2014. Thompson hosts a private club for individual use of the road course.

Thompson Speedway Motorsports Park continues to run ACT/PASS sanctioned races on the oval track, with 10 oval events scheduled for 2026. The two largest events, The Icebreaker and The Sunoco World Series of Speedway Racing, are traditionally New England’s season opener and season finale. Both multi-day events draw several hundred race cars from up to 18 divisions. The Road course hosts many more events such as SCCA major and regional races, vintage race festivals, high-performance driving events (HPDEs) and drifting.

The park has hosted eleven events for the 24 Hours of LeMons series. The first was in August 2015, and the most recent was in August 2025.

In June 2017, the park hosted two rounds of the 2017 Global RallyCross Championship using a combination of the road course and a dirt track

== Use in simulations / games ==
The oval layout was laser scanned for millimeter accuracy and added to the online racing simulation iRacing in 2010.

A recreation of the track as it appeared in 1970 is included in the retro-themed game NASCAR Legends.

== Notable race results ==
=== Atlantic Championship Series ===
Year	Race winner	Team	Car	Engine
2014	(Canada) Daniel Burkett	K-Hill Motorsports	Swift 016.a	Mazda-Cosworth MZR
2014	(United States) Ethan Ringel	One Formula Racing	Swift 016.a	Mazda-Cosworth MZR

== Race lap records ==
As of May 2015, the fastest official race lap records at Thompson Speedway Motorsports Park are listed as:

Category	Time	Driver	Vehicle	Event
Road Course (1968–1972, 2014–present): 1.700 mi (2.736 km)
Formula 5000	0:59.400	David Hobbs	Surtees TS5	1969 Thompson Grand Prix
Formula Atlantic	1:01.955	Daniel Burkett	Swift 016.a	2014 Thompson Atlantic Championship round
Formula 2000	1:07.386	Skylar Robinson	Citation F1000	2014 Thompson F2000 Championship round
Formula Lites	1:08.336	Vinicius Papareli	Crawford FL15	2015 Thompson Formula Lites round
Formula 1600	1:10.527	Evan Mehan	Mygale SJ 2012	2014 Thompson F1600 Championship round

== Deaths ==
Thompson Speedway Motorsports Park has also endured some tragic moments which have claimed the lives of the following competitors: David Peterson (1977), Tony Willman, Fred DeSarro, Harry Kourafus Jr., Dick Dixon, Corky Cookman, Tom Baldwin, Sr., John Blewett III, and most recently Shane Hammond (April 6, 2008). DeSarro's death prompted a memorial fund-raiser which drew the largest crowd to date and the Northeast's best drivers in an open competition Modified race with no purse. Both Evans and Bodine mounted their cars with wings. Baldwin and Blewett died while competing in the same race on the tour, three years apart.

== Bibliography ==
- O'Neil, Terry (2018). The Golden Days of Thompson Speedway & Raceway. Vol. 1: The Formative Years: 1945–1959. Deerfield, IL: Dalton Watson Fine Books. ISBN 978-1-85443-298-8.
- O'Neil, Terry (2018). The Golden Days of Thompson Speedway & Raceway. Vol. 2: Changing Fortunes: 1960–1977. Deerfield, IL: Dalton Watson Fine Books. ISBN 978-1-85443-298-8.
