= SCCA Pro Racing =

Car racing body in the United States

- Sport: Sports car racing, Touring car racing, Rallycross
- Jurisdiction: United States
- Founded: 1963
- Headquarters: Topeka, Kansas

Official website
- www.sccaproracing.com

SCCA Pro Racing is the pro racing division of the Sports Car Club of America. SCCA Pro Racing was formed in 1963; the company is a fully owned subsidiary of SCCA.

== Current championships ==
Since the beginning in 1963 SCCA Pro Racing sanctioned various championships of sports cars, GT's, touring cars, formula cars and rally races.

=== Formula Race Promotions ===
With the disappearance of the U.S. F2000 National Championship in 2006, Formula Race Promotions launched the F2000 Championship Series. This series was more focused on the amateur Formula Continental drivers.

As of 2011 SCCA Pro Racing sanctions the F1600 Championship Series. This is a Formula Ford based race class that allows the Honda Fit engine alongside the Ford Kent engine.

For 2012 SCCA Pro Racing sanctioned the revived Atlantic Championship. It raced under SCCA Formula Atlantic rules. This meant the class allowed older Formula Atlantic cars with Toyota engines alongside the newer Formula Atlantic cars using Mazda engines. The class was put on hold for the 2013 season and returned in 2014.

For 2017 and 2018, the three Formula Race Promotions series will be sanctioned by USAC.

In 2019, SCCA Pro Racing regained the rights to the three FRP series.

=== Trans-Am Series ===
SCCA Pro Racing sanctioned the Trans-Am Series from its inception in 1966 to its initial folding in 2006. The series was revived in 2009 allowing SCCA GT1 cars to race in a national series, with SCCA Pro Racing continuing to sanction the series. Management of the Trans-Am Series was transferred to the Trans Am Race Company, LLC in 2011. SCCA Pro Racing continues to sanction Trans Am Series events and provide contracted event operations services to the series. In January 2017, SCCA Pro Racing and the Trans Am Race Company, LLC (TARC) signed an unprecedented 25-year agreement, renewing their earlier partnership. Since 2012, SCCA GT1, GT2, and GT3 cars are allowed in the series. Currently, there are four classes of competition in the "Trans Am presented by Pirelli" Series; TA, TA2, TA3, and TA4.

=== Formula Regional Americas Championship ===
The Formula Regional Americas Championship powered by Honda is an FIA Formula 3 racing series that competes in the United States, with plans in the future to race in Canada and Mexico. The championship is sanctioned by SCCA Pro Racing, the professional racing division of the Sports Car Club of America, in conjunction with the Automobile Competition Committee for the United States, the United States representative to the FIA. Starting in 2020 the champion earned a scholarship to compete in Indy Lights.

=== Formula 4 United States Championship ===
The Formula 4 United States Championship is an auto racing series held under FIA Formula 4 regulations. The championship is designed to support North American drivers enter international open-wheel racing, by using the same regulations used by other series globally, rather than compete with existing Road to Indy ladder, with the drivers earning points towards an FIA Superlicence. It will serve as an initial step into car racing for drivers graduating from karting.

== Previous championships ==
=== United States Road Racing Championship ===
Between 1963-1968 and in 1998-1999 the USRRC was organized by SCCA Pro Racing. At first the series ran open sports cars and GT's. At the end 1968 the series was dropped in favor of Can-Am, which was then called USRRC. The Can-Am championship folded in 1986. The USRRC was revived for 2 years in the late nineties. After the 1999 season the organisation was taken over by Grand-Am.

=== Can-Am ===
The Can-Am championship was a joint-venture between the Canadian CASC and the American SCCA. The series started in 1966 as a sports car championship. But near the end of its cycle in 1986 it used converted Formula 5000 cars.

=== SCCA Grand Prix Championship ===
This series began in 1967 with the creation of the SCCA Grand Prix Championship. This series initially permitted SCCA Formula A, Formula B and Formula C cars. As of 1968 cars powered by 5 liter production-based V8 engines (later to be known as Formula 5000 cars) were permitted for the first time. The series folded in 1976 but in some way continued in the single-seat Can-Am series.

=== Scirocco/Bilstein Cup ===
This was a spec touring car series for the first generation Volkswagen Scirocco. The series started in 1976 and was the first pro spec touring series.

=== SCCA/CART Indy Car Series ===
In 1979 the SCCA sanctioned the first season of the CART because CART wasn't recognized by ACCUS. After the inaugural season the sanctioning was taken over by CART.

=== American Cities Racing League ===
Similar to A1GP, cities primarily on the west coast represented teams for each two drivers. A concept similar to any regular stick and ball sport.

=== Corvette Challenge ===
The Corvette Challenge was a spec series which used the Chevrolet Corvette (C4) car. The series existed in 1988 and 1989. The Corvette Challenge was formed after Corvettes were no longer allowed in the World Challenge. The cars were re-admitted into World Challenge in 1990 after the challenge folded.

=== RaceTruck Challenge ===
The RaceTruck Challenge was a racing class for pick up trucks. Trucks like the Jeep Comanche, Ford Ranger and Dodge D-50 were allowed to run in the series that ran between 1987 and 1991.

=== U.S. F2000 National Championship ===
The SCCA American Continental Championship and the USAC Formula 2000 were merged in 1995 to form the U.S. F2000 National Championship. The series initially folded in 2006 but was revived by Mazda Road to Indy in 2010.

=== Shelby Can-Am Pro Series ===
This was a short-lived sports car racing class. The series ran between 1991 and 1996. In those years SCA was a national class which was also featured at the Runoffs. After the series folded the cars were allowed in the C Sports Racer class.

=== Spec Racer Ford Pro Series ===
In 1994 SCCA Pro Racing began a pro class for the popular Spec Racer Ford. The series folded in 2003 due to a lack of interest by drivers. The series was revived for 2010 and 2011 with fields of 30+ cars it was a success but it was discontinued at the end of 2011.

=== Barber Dodge Pro Series ===
For 1995, 1996 and 1997 SCCA Pro Racing sanctioned the Barber Dodge Pro series. They took over the series from International Motor Sports Association after Charles Slater sold the organisation. After Professional Sports Car Racing gave new life to the IMSA organisation they sanctioned the Barber Dodge series as of 1998.

=== Formula SCCA ===
The Formula SCCA was launched in 2002 racing a spec Van Diemen DP06 powered by a Mazda MZR engine. In 2004 the series raced with the U.S. F2000 National Championship but was dropped at the end of the season. The season was revived as Formula Enterprises in 2010 and 2011. And the end of the 2011 season it was announced that the Formula Enterprises would form the 'National' class in the U.S. F2000 National Championship in 2012.

=== Sports Racing Pro Series ===
In 2003 and 2004 SCCA Pro Racing sanctioned the Sports Racing Pro Series. A class initially for the Van Diemen DP06 sports racer. In 2004 it also allowed Sports 2000 cars.

=== CART Stars ===
SCCA Pro Racing co-sanctioned together with CART and the WKA the kart series Stars of Tomorrow in 2003. This formed the bottom step on the CART racing ladder.

=== Formula Drift ===
SCCA Pro Racing sanctioned Formula Drift in 2004 and 2005 before it became an independent sanctioning body.

=== SRT Viper Cup ===
SCCA Pro Racing launched the SRT Viper Cup in 2011 for amateur drivers to compete in their Dodge Viper ACR-X.

=== Formula 1000 ===
In 2011 and 2012 SCCA Pro Racing sanctioned the East coast based Formula 1000 Championship.

=== Global RallyCross Championship ===
In 2013, the Global RallyCross championship was sanctioned by SCCA Pro Racing. The series changed to USAC sanctioning in 2014.

=== SCCA World Challenge ===
The SCCA World Challenge saw life as the Escort Endurance Championship in 1986. Between 1986 and 1989 the series consisted of a number of endurance races. As of 1990 the renamed World Challenge consisted of semi-endurance races. The series now uses a sprint-race format with a standing start. In 2014, GT3-classed cars were brought in as part of the top class of racing. WC Vision, the owners of Pirelli World Challenge moved to USAC sanctioning beginning in 2017.

=== Global Mazda MX-5 Cup ===
Following the popular Spec Miata club racing class, SCCA Pro Racing started a pro series. The Battery Tender Global Mazda MX-5 Cup presented by BFGoodrich Tires was started in 2003. It was first split into a Pacific Tour and an Atlantic Tour. Nowadays it runs an MX-5 Cup and a Skip Barber Challenge. In 2017, the series moved to INDYCAR sanctioning and nowadays is under IMSA/NASCAR sanctioning.

== See also ==
- 944 Cup
