= Kuno Wittmer =

Canadian racing driver

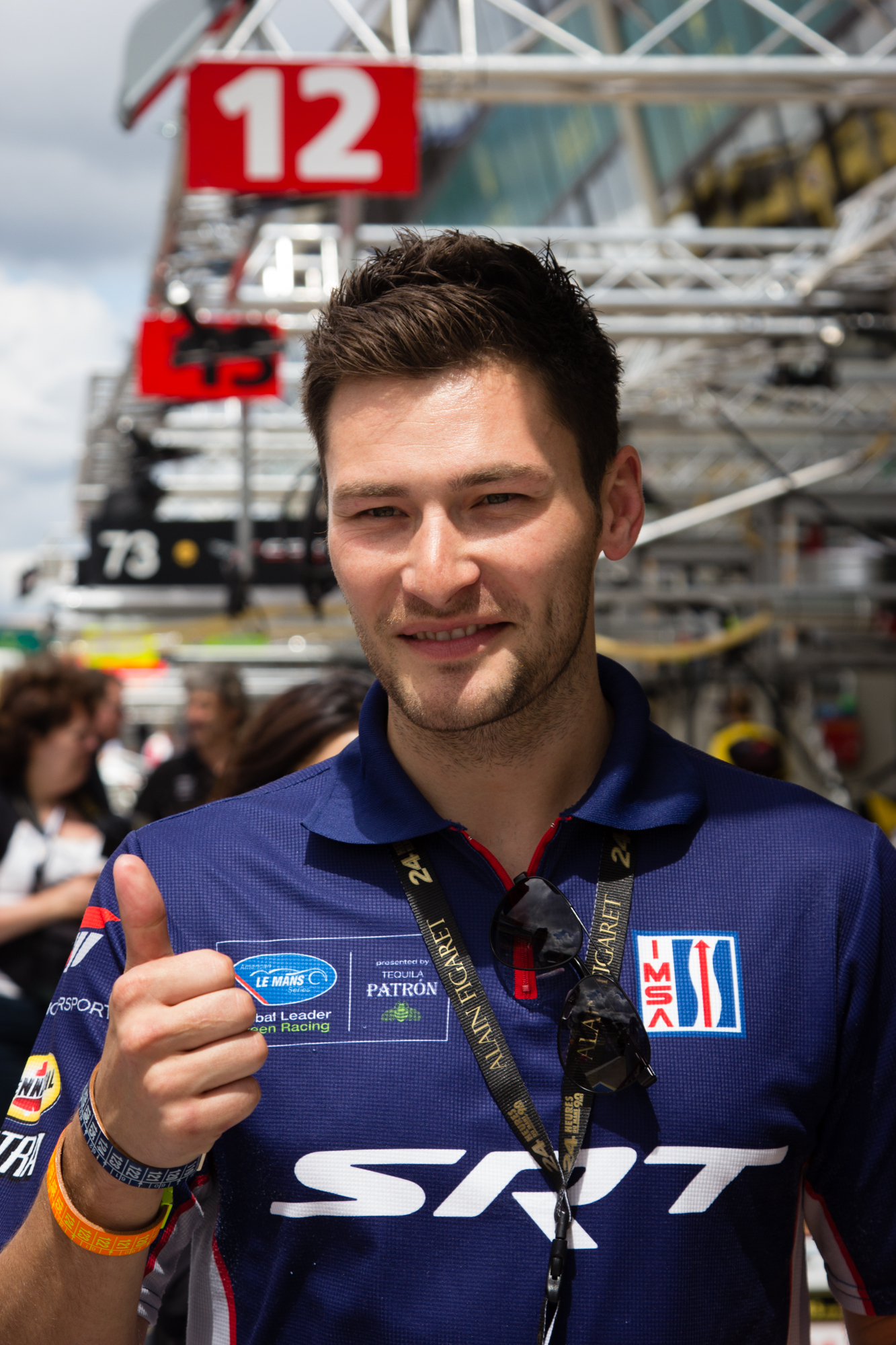
- Wittmer at the 2013 24 Hours of Le Mans
- Nationality: (Canada) Canadian
- Born: 6 September 1982 (age 44) Hudson, Montreal, Canada
- Categorisation: FIA Platinum (until 2015); FIA Gold (2016–2022); FIA Silver (2023–)

Championship titles
- 2005 2014: Honda Michelin Challenge; United SportsCar Championship – GTLM class

Kuno Wittmer (born 6 September 1982) is a Canadian former racing driver who competed in such series as the IMSA SportsCar Championship, Michelin Pilot Challenge, and Pirelli World Challenge.

A member of the Canadian Motorsport Hall of Fame, Wittmer was a factory driver for Chrysler, BMW, and McLaren over the course of his career. Wittmer won the 2014 United SportsCar Championship GTLM title driving for SRT Motorsports, and scored a class victory at the 2015 24 Hours of Daytona driving for Riley Motorsports.

== Career ==
=== Early career ===
Wittmer was born from a racing family, preceded by his grandfather, father, and uncle competing in local rallying events in their home province of Quebec. Wittmer received his first ATV at age three, before competing with both ATVs and in motocross at the age of seven. When Wittmer was 15, he attended a racing school at Circuit Mont-Tremblant, beginning his circuit racing career.

In 1999, Wittmer began competing in the Canadian Formula Ford Championship, and claimed the series' Rookie of the Year honors at season's end. A brief stint in the Atlantic Championship followed, before Wittmer returned to Formula Ford competition and karting in Quebec over the next few years. In 2002, Wittmer secured his first career championship title in the Quebec Sedan GT Championship. A year of Formula Renault competition followed, before Wittmer transitioned to touring car competition in 2004 with Canada's Honda Michelin Challenge. He won the championship in 2005, taking five wins and six total podiums nine races.

=== Touring car competition (2006–2009) ===
In 2006, Wittmer began competing in the Pirelli World Challenge, continuing his relationship with de Sigi Autosport, the team with whom he'd competed in the Honda Michelin Challenge over the past two seasons. After a quiet first season, Wittmer linked up with RealTime Racing for 2007, competing with the team he had "been looking up to since the age of 15." He scored a TC-class pole position on home soil at Toronto, and scored his sole podium during the final round of the season at Laguna Seca. He finished third in the championship behind Jeff Altenburg and Randy Pobst. Wittmer also supplemented his 2007 campaign with a part-time drive in the then-Koni Sports Car Challenge for Georgian Bay Motorsports.

Wittmer returned to RealTime in 2008, and would claim his first career World Challenge victory during the TC class' second round of the season at VIR. He would claim two further race victories, at Lime Rock and Mid-Ohio, and finished the season with five total podiums to his name. The season concluded with another third-place championship finish for Wittmer. He also stepped up to a full-time drive in the Koni Sports Car Challenge's ST class, finishing third in the championship for the i-Moto team. Wittmer embarked on his final TC season in 2009, returning to the RealTime stable for the third consecutive season. He scored just one victory that season, on home soil at Mosport, en route to a sixth-place championship finish.

=== Dodge factory driver (2010–2014) ===
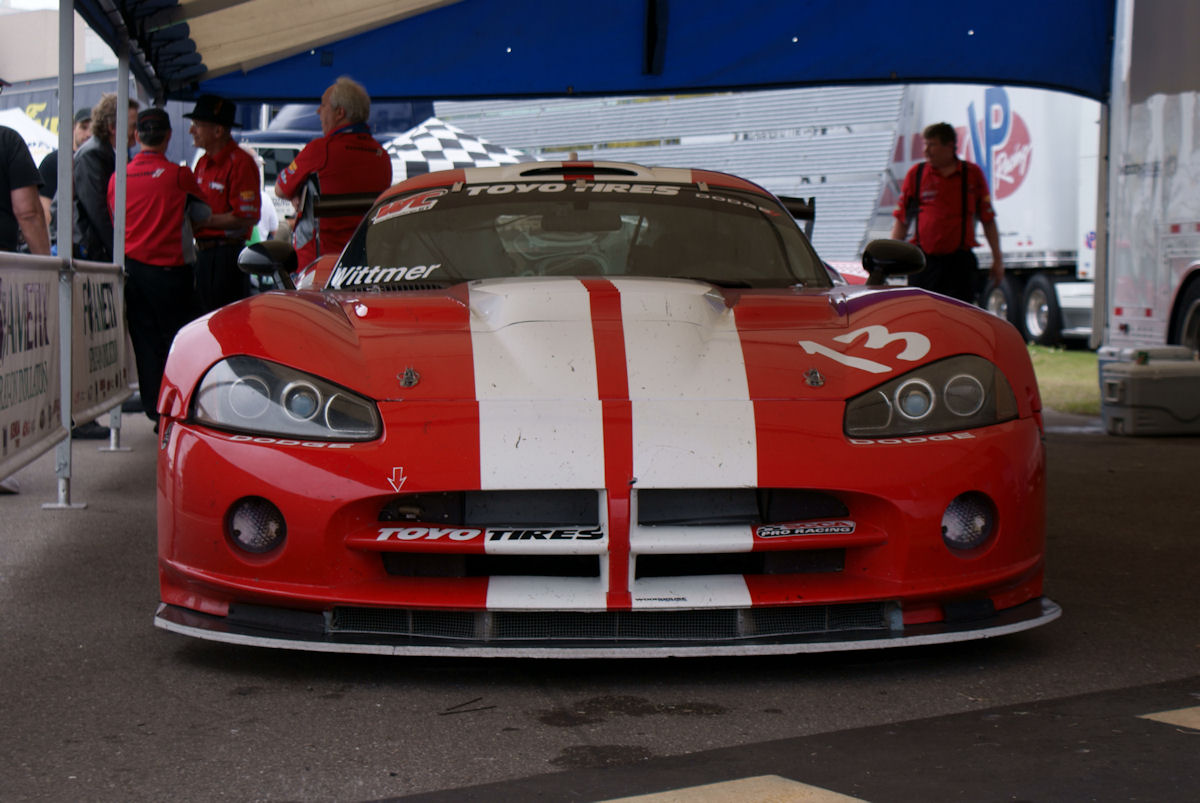
Wittmer's Viper at St. Petersburg in 2010

Wittmer began his relationship with Dodge in late 2009, when he took on a one-off World Challenge drive for Woodhouse Performance in the GT class. The following year, Wittmer began competing full-time in the GT class, driving an SRT Motorsports-prepared Dodge Viper Competition Coupe. After finishing sixth and fifth in the double-header at St. Petersburg, Wittmer claimed his maiden GT-class victory during the ensuing round at Long Beach, leading lights-to-flag and setting a new track record during qualifying. Wittmer followed that up with a second-place finish during the next round at Mosport, but would be forced to wait until the final round of the season at Utah Motorsports Campus to return to victory lane. He finished the season runner-up in the GT class, just under 200 points behind Pobst.

Wittmer shifted to a test driver role for 2011, in advance of the LM GTE-class SRT Viper GTS-R program coming online in 2012. Wittmer completed a one-off drive in the ADAC GT Masters series, as well as taking on a single race in the one-make Dodge Viper Cup. Later that year, he set a production car lap record at Utah Motorsports Campus in a Dodge Viper ACR, and worked with the SCCA to develop technical regulations for its new B-spec regulations for 2012.

Wittmer made his American Le Mans Series debut at Mid-Ohio in August 2012, giving the GTE-class Viper its first outing in official competition. Wittmer's No. 91 entry, which he shared with Dominik Farnbacher, finished tenth on debut. Another top-ten followed at Road America, before the team registered their season-best finish of eighth at Petit Le Mans.

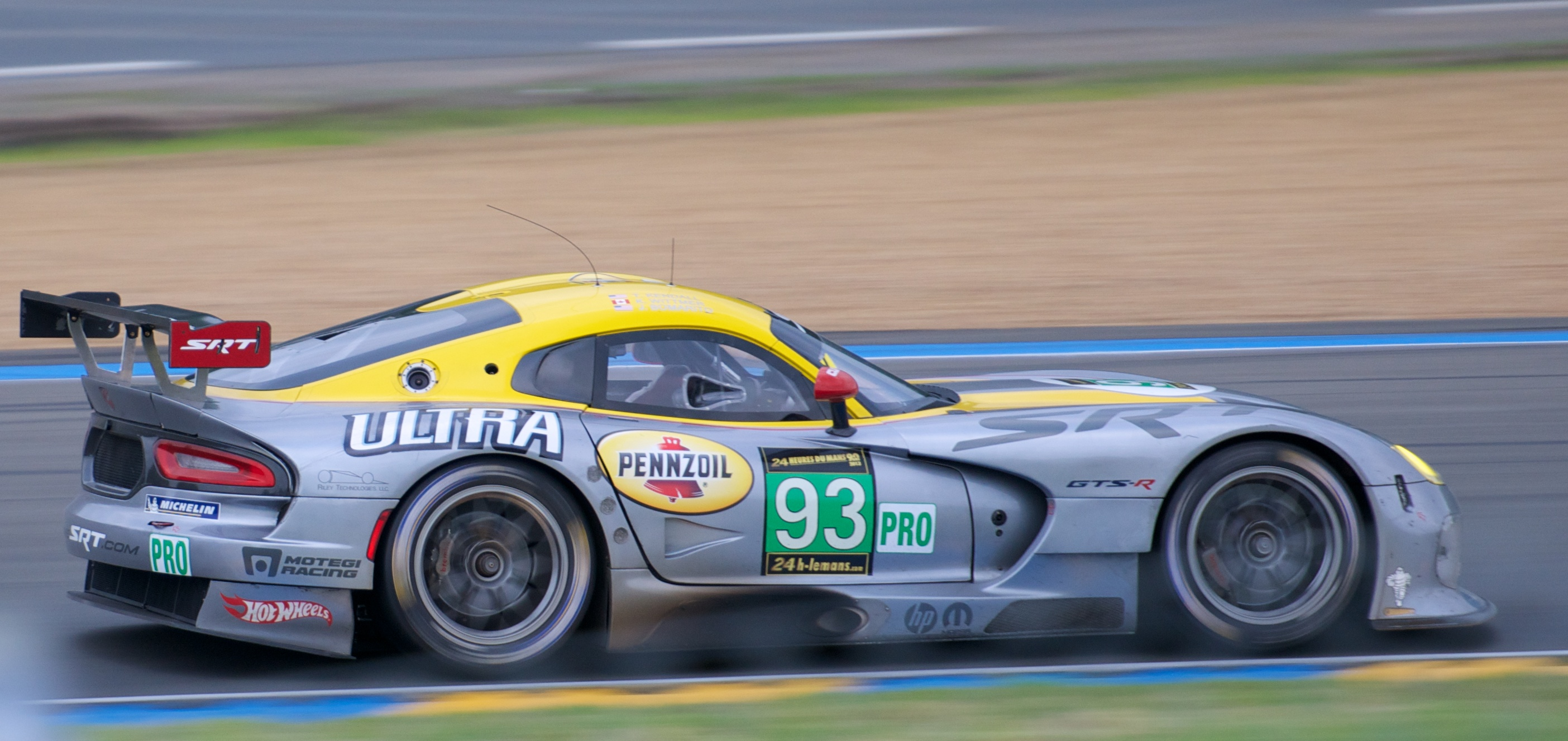
The SRT Viper Wittmer piloted at Le Mans in 2013

The program expanded to a full-time effort in 2013, as Wittmer jumped to the No. 93 car alongside Jonathan Bomarito for the full season, with Tommy Kendall joining for the endurance rounds. In January, it was confirmed that the program would make its debut at the 24 Hours of Le Mans that year, marking the Viper marque's return to the race for the first time since the early 2000s. Wittmer remained entered in the No. 93, marking his own debut at the event, which he called "a dream come true." After starting 11th in GTE Pro, Wittmer's entry came home ninth in class, five laps behind the sister No. 53 entry and 14 laps behind the class-winning Porsche 911 RSR.

After a quiet start to the ALMS season, which saw Wittmer and Bomarito finish no higher than sixth in class over the first four races, Wittmer's home race at Mosport provided the entry's first podium finish of the season. After starting on pole at the hands of Bomarito, the duo finished third in class behind the sister car and the race-winning No. 4 Corvette. Bomarito took pole for the next race at Road America, but the entry would fade to a sixth place finish. Wittmer claimed his second and final ALMS podium later that season at COTA, where the #93 finished second in class. At the end of the season, Bomarito and Wittmer were classified ninth in the GT class championship.

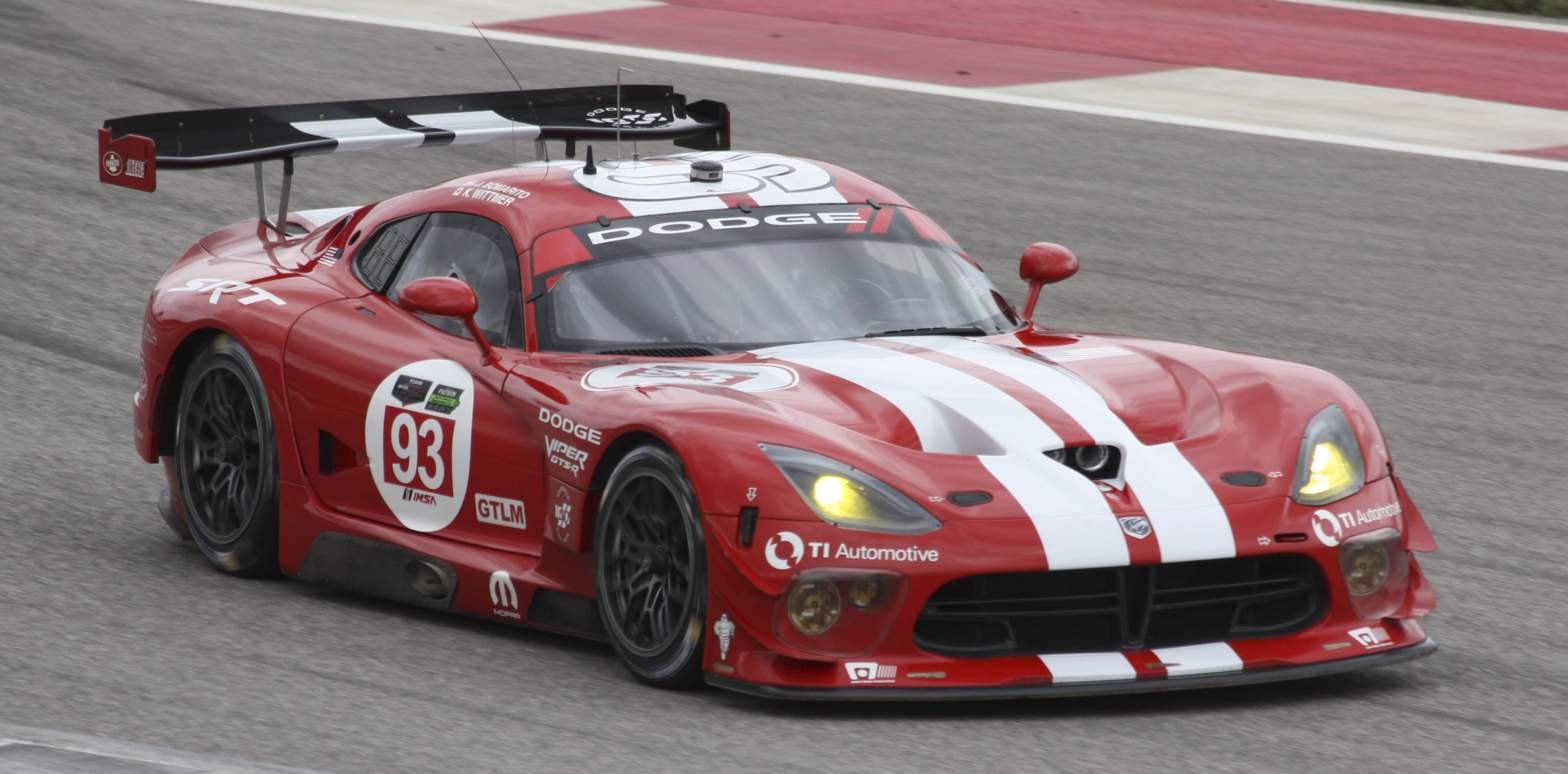
Wittmer en route to victory at COTA in 2014

Ahead of 2014, Wittmer's FIA Driver Categorisation ranking was downgraded from Platinum to Gold. This came despite a continuation of his factory drive with SRT Motorsports, as he returned for the full United SportsCar Championship campaign with the team, joined again by Bomarito for the full season. After a sixth-place finish at Daytona, Wittmer came up just short of his first victory at the 12 Hours of Sebring, placing second. He returned to the podium at Watkins Glen, claiming a third place finish. As such, the following round at Mosport carried particular weight for Wittmer, as he felt the team was poised for a breakthrough victory in the championship. He claimed pole in GTLM, and would finish the race second behind the #3 Corvette.

Shortly thereafter, Wittmer took part in a one-off Pirelli World Challenge appearance to mark the launch of the Viper GT3 customer racing program at Toronto. He finished second overall on Saturday, and scored the race victory on Sunday.

Wittmer claimed his maiden IMSA victory at Indianapolis in late July, the first of the year for SRT Motorsports. Following another podium at Road America and a fifth-place at VIR, Wittmer returned to victory lane as part of a Viper 1-2 at COTA. With both Bomarito and Wittmer in contention for the drivers' title at Petit Le Mans, the duo were split for the championship decider, with Wittmer drafted into the #91 alongside Marc Goossens and Ryan Hunter-Reay. A podium finish for the #91 was enough for Wittmer to secure the title, making him the inaugural United SportsCar Championship GTLM champion.

Less than 48 hours after his title was confirmed, Chrysler shuttered the factory-backed Viper program for 2015, leaving Wittmer without a ride.

=== Transition period and factory return (2015–2017) ===
Without a factory drive for 2015, Wittmer was left searching for a ride ahead of the new season, examining rides in the WEC and WTCC before settling on a return to IMSA competition. He returned to the wheel of a Viper to kick off the season, taking the GTD-class victory at the 24 Hours of Daytona alongside former factory teammate Farnbacher, as well as Al Carter, Cameron Lawrence, and Ben Keating. Another one-off with HART followed at Sebring, this time in the Continental Tire Sports Car Challenge, marking his return to touring car competition with Honda for the first time since 2008.

Later that season, Wittmer stepped in for TRG driver James Davison in the team's GTD entry at Watkins Glen, a move spurred by a scheduling conflict with the latter's Pirelli World Challenge program. Following the event, Wittmer stepped in to replace Davison for the remainder of the season, taking on a development and coaching role for full-time driver Christina Nielsen in the process. Wittmer scored a podium finish at Lime Rock, before taking consecutive runner-up finishes at Road America and VIR. Despite missing three races, he was classified tenth in the GTD drivers' championship at the conclusion of the season. During the offseason, he launched the Kuno Wittmer Trophy, a scholarship program for grassroots racing drivers in Quebec.

The following year saw Wittmer return to a factory role, aligning with BMW in both their factory GTLM program as well as the brand's customer racing efforts. Wittmer's GTLM campaign saw him compete in the Michelin Endurance Cup with BMW Team RLL, lining up alongside John Edwards and Lucas Luhr in the new-for-2016 BMW M6 GTLM. Wittmer's entry tallied a best finish of sixth, at both Sebring and the final round at Road Atlanta. Wittmer also took part in the inaugural SprintX GT Championship Series, driving alongside Michael Mills for the latter's eponymous racing team. The duo swept the opening weekend of the season at Mosport en route to Mills winning the Sportsman championship at year's end.

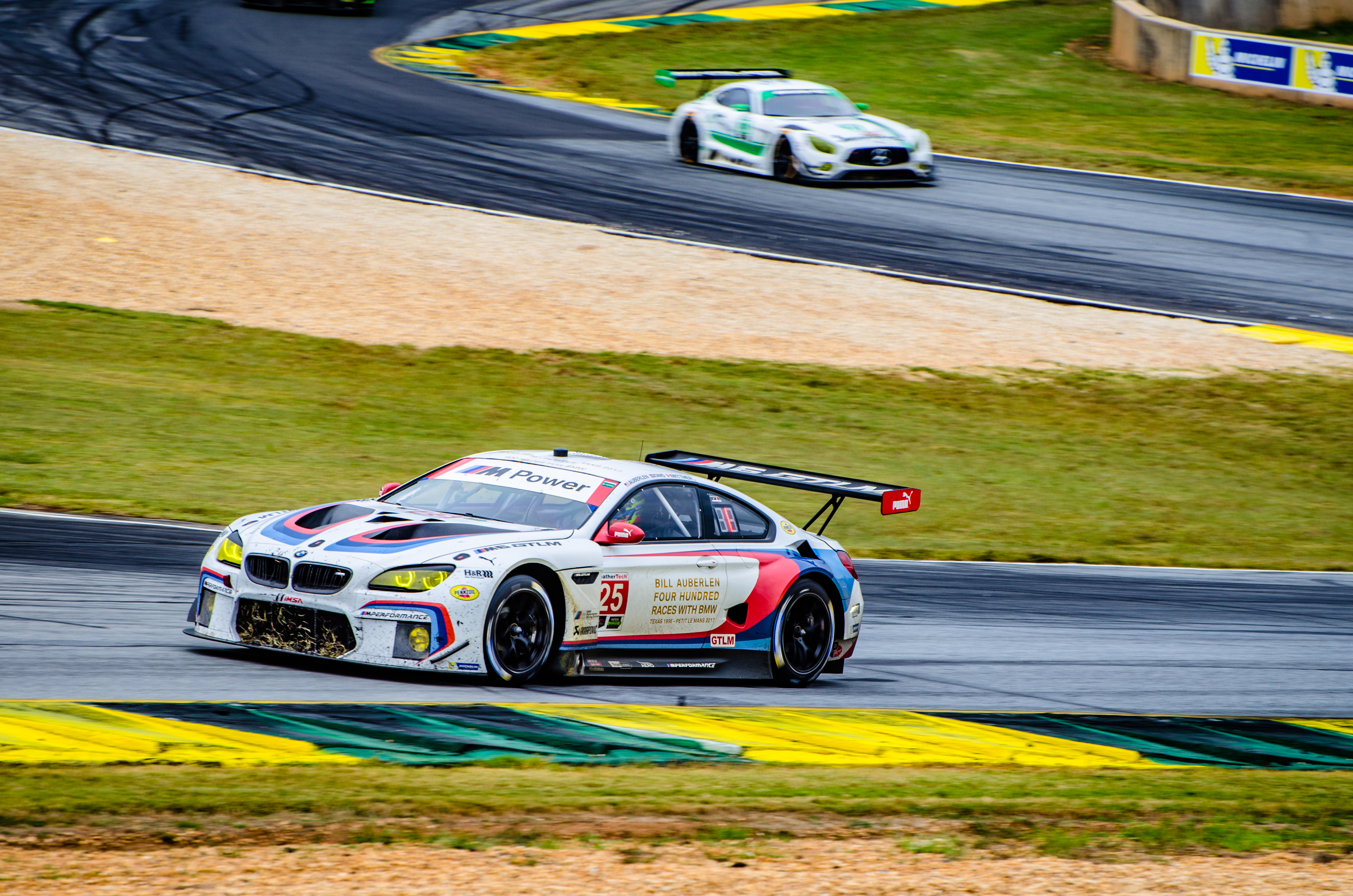
Wittmer at Road Atlanta in 2017

Wittmer reprised his endurance role in 2017, splitting his duties between the #24 entry at the Rolex 24 and the #25 for the remaining two endurance rounds. Wittmer scored his first and only victory with the program in the M6 GTLM's final race, as he and co-drivers Bill Auberlen and Alexander Sims took a class victory at Petit Le Mans. Wittmer also made his debut at the Nürburgring 24 Hours in 2017, driving alongside Jesse Krohn, Bruno Spengler, and Jörg Müller for Schubert Motorsport. At the conclusion of 2017, following two part-time seasons in BMW machinery, Wittmer parted ways with the manufacturer in an attempt to secure a full-time seat for 2018.

=== Later career ===
Wittmer's primary program for 2018 involved a return to touring cars, as he lined up alongside Rodrigo Sales for Compass Racing's TCR-class effort in the Continental Tire Sports Car Challenge. The duo began the season strongly, taking victories in two of the first three races at Sebring and Mid-Ohio. Wittmer and Sales added a third victory of the season at Road America, alongside four further podium finishes. Wittmer entered the final round of the season with a chance at winning the championship, as he and Sales sat just five points adrift of the sister car of Britt Casey Jr. and Tom Long. However, an accident early in the final race condemned the duo to a second-place championship finish. Wittmer added one-offs at the 12 Hours of Sebring, Bathurst 12 Hour, and Nürburgring 24 Hours to his program in 2018.

Wittmer graduated to the GS class with the team for 2019, driving for the majority of the season alongside Paul Holton in the team's new McLaren 570S GT4. The duo kicked off the season with a pole position and victory at Daytona, fueled by a late pass from Holton on the Carbahn Audi of Jeff Westphal. In February, Wittmer was confirmed as a McLaren factory driver for the year. Wittmer had been in talks with the manufacturer since October of the previous year, thanks to his contacts at Compass Racing, and prioritized the newly-named Michelin Pilot Challenge in his factory efforts for the year. The duo would take one more podium over the course of the season, a second-place run at Road America in which Wittmer mistakenly hit his pit limiter button on the way to the finish, en route to a 13th-place championship finish for Wittmer.

Prior to the 2020 Michelin Pilot Challenge season, Wittmer joined AWA Racing's McLaren entry in the Grand Sport class. Wittmer took pole in his first race with AWA, with a half-second advantage over Tyler McQuarrie in second. Travel challenges related to the COVID-19 pandemic restricted the entry to that sole appearance over the course of the year. The duo returned to MPC competition in 2021 and kicked off the season with a victory at Daytona before adding another two rounds later at Mid-Ohio. Wittmer returned to the podium during the final round at Road Atlanta, and concluded the season fifth in the drivers' championship.

2022 saw Wittmer return to IMSA SportsCar Championship competition, pivoting to the LMP3 class alongside 2021 co-driver Orey Fidani. The switch was driven by frustration with the balance of performance formula present in the GT4 ranks, encouraging Fidani and Wittmer to search for new classes in which to go racing. They settled on LMP3 following a test of teammate Anthony Mantella's Duqueine D08 in late 2021, after which Fidani stated they were "instantly hooked." Despite being initially tabbed as a full-time driver in the entry, Wittmer stepped away after the round at Mid-Ohio. Later that year, Wittmer debuted in rallying at the Rallye de Charlevoix.

In August 2023, Wittmer announced his official retirement from professional racing. In November, he was inducted into the Canadian Motorsport Hall of Fame.

== Racing record ==
=== Career summary ===
Season	Series	Team	Races	Wins	Poles	F/Laps	Podiums	Points	Position
1999	Canadian Formula Ford Championship	Basi Autosport	8	0	0	0	3	183	7th
2000	Formula Toyota Atlantic	Hylton Motorsports	4	0	0	0	0	6	22nd
2001	Canadian Formula Ford Championship	Basi Autosport	2	0	0	0	0	7	23rd
2002	Canadian Formula Ford Championship	de Sigi Autosport	7	0	0	0	0	30	10th
2003	Formula Renault 2.0 Fran-Am	Gelles Racing	?	?	?	?	?	141	9th
2004	Honda Michelin Challenge	de Sigi Autosport	10	0	2	2	3	204	5th
2005	Honda Michelin Challenge	de Sigi Autosport	9	5	3	1	6	274	**1st**
2006	Speed World Challenge - TC	de Sigi Autosport / Autohaus	6	0	0	0	0	55	21st
2007	Speed World Challenge - TC	RealTime Racing	10	0	1	0	1	230	**3rd**
2007	Koni Sports Car Challenge - ST	Georgian Bay Motorsports	5	1	?	?	3	121	32nd
2008	Speed World Challenge - TC	RealTime Racing	10	3	0	1	5	930	**3rd**
2008	Koni Sports Car Challenge - ST	i-Moto	10	0	?	?	2	237	**3rd**
2008	Koni Sports Car Challenge - GS	i-Moto	1	0	?	?	0	5	85th
2008	Canadian Touring Car Championship - Super Touring	Lombardi Racing	9	2	1	2	5	722	11th
2009	Speed World Challenge - TC	RealTime Racing	10	1	1	0	1	803	6th
2009	Speed World Challenge - GT	Woodhouse Performance	1	0	0	0	0	60	30th
2009	Canadian Touring Car Championship - Super Touring	Lombardi Racing	4	0	0	0	4	452	19th
2010	SCCA Pro Racing World Challenge - GT	Dodge Motorsports	12	2	1	2	4	1098	**2nd**
2011	ADAC GT Masters	Vulkan Racing-Mintgen Motorsport	2	0	0	0	0	0	NC
2011	Dodge Viper Cup		1	?	?	?	?	0	27th
2012	American Le Mans Series - GT	SRT Motorsports	3	0	0	0	0	5	28th
2013	American Le Mans Series - GT	SRT Motorsports	10	0	0	1	2	73	9th
2013	24 Hours of Le Mans - LMGTE Pro	SRT Motorsports	1	0	0	0	0	N/A	9th
2013	Rolex Sports Car Series - GT	TRG	1	0	0	0	0	16	62nd
2014	United SportsCar Championship - GTLM	SRT Motorsports	11	2	1	0	7	331	**1st**
2014	Pirelli World Challenge - GT	SRT Motorsports	2	1	?	?	2	234	25th
2015	United SportsCar Championship - GTD	TRG-AMR	6	0	0	0	3	202	10th
2015	United SportsCar Championship - GTD	Riley Motorsports	1	1	0	0	1	202	10th
2015	Canadian Touring Car Championship - Grand Touring	Fastco Motorsports	2	0	1	2	0	123	9th
2015	Continental Tire Sports Car Challenge - ST	HART	2	0	0	0	0	24	54th
2016	Pirelli World Challenge - SprintX - GT	Mills Racing	4	1	1	0	3	390	**2nd**
2016	IMSA SportsCar Championship - GTLM	BMW Team RLL	3	0	0	0	0	73	16th
2017	IMSA SportsCar Championship - GTLM	BMW Team RLL	3	1	0	0	1	80	13th
2017	Nürburgring Endurance Series - SP9	Schubert Motorsport	2	0	0	0	0	?	?
2017	24 Hours of Nürburgring - SP9	Schubert Motorsport	1	0	0	0	0	N/A	11th
2018	Continental Tire SportsCar Challenge - TC	Compass Racing	10	3	1	2	7	305	**2nd**
2018	IMSA SportsCar Championship - GTD	CJ Wilson Racing	1	0	0	0	0	15	68th
2018	24 Hours of Nürburgring - SP-X	GTronix 360 Team mcchip	1	0	0	0	1	N/A	**2nd**
2018	Bathurst 12 Hour - C	RHC-Lawrence/Strom	1	0	0	0	0	N/A	4th
2019	Michelin Pilot Challenge - GS	Compass Racing	10	1	0	0	2	175	13th
2020	Michelin Pilot Challenge - GS	AWA	1	0	1	0	0	5	69th
2021	Michelin Pilot Challenge - GS	AWA	10	2	2	1	3	2240	5th
2022	IMSA SportsCar Championship - LMP3	AWA	3	0	0	0	0	556	25th

=== Complete American Le Mans Series results ===
(key) (Races in bold indicate pole position)

Year	Team	Class	Make	Engine	1	2	3	4	5	6	7	8	9	10	Rank	Points	Ref
2012	SRT Motorsports	GT	SRT Viper GTS-R	SRT 8.0L V10	SEB	LBH	LGA	LIM	MOS	MOH; 10	ELK; 9	BAL	VIR	PET; 8	28th	5	
2013	SRT Motorsports	GT	SRT Viper GTS-R	SRT 8.0L V10	SEB; 10	LBH; 8	LGA; 11	LIM; 6	**MOS**; 3	**ELK**; 6	BAL; 6	COT; 2	VIR; 9	PET; 5	9th	73	

=== Complete Grand-Am Rolex Sports Car Series results ===
(key) (Races in bold indicate pole position)

Year	Team	Class	Make	Engine	1	2	3	4	5	6	7	8	9	10	11	12	Rank	Points	Ref
2013	TRG	GT	Porsche 911 GT3	Porsche 4.0L Flat-6	DAY; 20	COT	BAR	ATL	DET	MOH	WGL	IMS	ELK	KAN	LGA	LIM	128th		

=== Complete WeatherTech SportsCar Championship results ===
(key) (Races in bold indicate pole position)

Year	Team	Class	Make	Engine	1	2	3	4	5	6	7	8	9	10	11	Rank	Points	Ref
2014	SRT Motorsports	GTLM	SRT Viper GTS-R	Dodge 8.0L V10	DAY; 6	SEB; 2	LBH; 10	LGA; 7	WGL; 3	**MOS**; 2	IMS; 1	ELK; 3	VIR; 5	COT; 1	PET; 3	**1st**	**331**	
2015	Riley Motorsports	GTD	Dodge Viper GT3-R	Dodge 8.3L V10	DAY; 1	SEB	LGA	BEL								10th	202	
2015	TRG-AMR	GTD	Aston Martin Vantage GT3	Aston Martin 6.0L V12					WGL; 10	LIM; 3	ELK; 2	VIR; 2	AUS; 8	PET; 9		10th	202	
2016	BMW Team RLL	GTLM	BMW M6 GTLM	BMW 4.4L V8	DAY; 11	SEB; 6	LBH	LGA	WGL	MOS	LIM	ELK	VIR	AUS	PET; 6	16th	73	
2017	BMW Team RLL	GTLM	BMW M6 GTLM	BMW 4.4L V8	DAY; 11	SEB; 6	LBH	AUS	WGL	MOS	LIM	ELK	VIR	LGA	PET; 1	13th	80	
2018	C.J. Wilson Racing	GTD	Acura NSX GT3	Acura 3.5L Turbo V6	DAY	SEB; 16	MOH	BEL	WGL	MOS	LIM	ELK	VIR	LGA	PET	61st	15	
2022	AWA	LMP3	Duqueine M30 - D08	Nissan VK56DE 5.6 L V8	DAY; 5	SEB; 4	MOH; 8	WGL	MOS	ELK	PET					25th	556	

=== Complete Bathurst 12 Hours results ===
Year	Team	Co-Drivers	Car	Class	Laps	Pos.	Class Pos.
2018	(United States) RHC-Lawrence/Strom	(United States) Cameron Lawrence (United States) Daren Jorgensen (United States) Brett Strom	BMW M4 GT4	C	188	29th	4th

=== Complete 24 Hours of Le Mans results ===
Year	Team	Co-Drivers	Car	Class	Laps	Pos.	Class Pos.
2013	(United States) SRT Motorsports	(United States) Tommy Kendall (United States) Jonathan Bomarito	SRT Viper GTS-R	LMGTE Pro	301	31st	9th

Sporting positions
Preceded by None	United SportsCar Championship; GTLM Champion; 2014	Succeeded by Patrick Pilet
