= 2016 Oak Tree Grand Prix =

Tenth round of the 2016 IMSA SportsCar Championship season

Track map of VIR

The 2016 Michelin GT Challenge at VIR was a sports car race sanctioned by the International Motor Sports Association (IMSA). The Race was held at Virginia International Raceway in Alton, Virginia on August 28, 2016. The race was the tenth round of the 2016 IMSA SportsCar Championship.

== Background ==
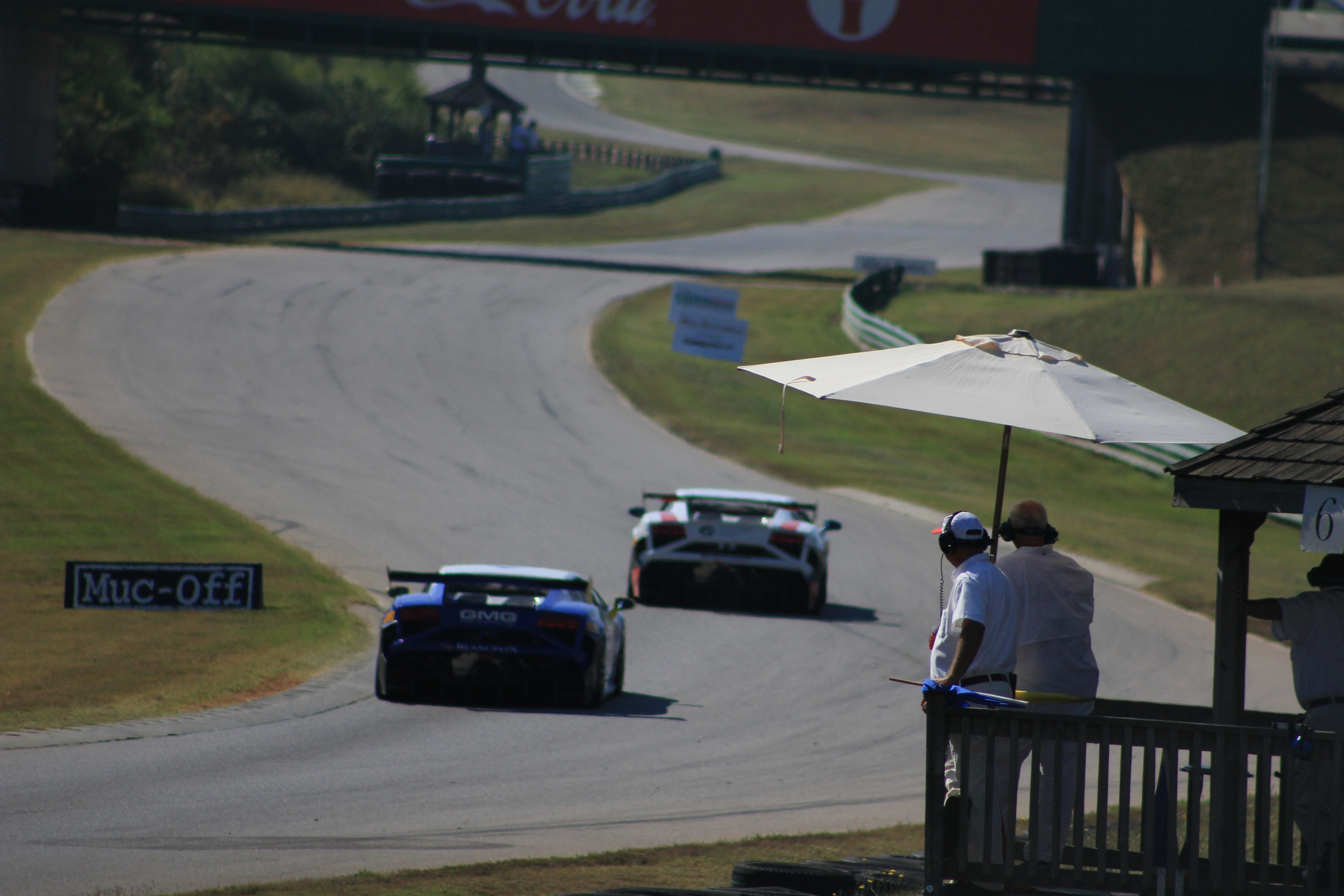
Virginia International Raceway, where the race was held.

=== Preview ===
International Motor Sports Association (IMSA) president Scott Atherton confirmed the race was part of the schedule for the 2016 IMSA SportsCar Championship (IMSA SCC) in August 2015. It was the third consecutive year the event was held as part of the WeatherTech SportsCar Championship. The 2016 Michelin GT Challenge at VIR was the tenth of twelve scheduled sports car races of 2016 by IMSA, and was the seventh round not held on the held as part of the North American Endurance Cup. The race was held at the ten-turn 3.270 mi (5.263 km) Virginia International Raceway in Alton, Virginia on August 28, 2016.

IMSA altered the balance of performance to try to create parity within the GTLM and GTD categories. The BMW M6 GTLM's refuelling hose restrictor was increased by 1 mm (0.039 in). The Ferrari 488 GTE and Ford GT's refuelling hose restrictor was shortened by 0.5 mm (0.020 in). Audi's R8 LMS had its refuelling hose restrictor increased by 0.5 mm (0.020 in). The Dodge Viper GT3-R and Ferrari 488 GT3 had their refuelling hose restrictor shortened by 0.5 mm (0.020 in). The Lamborghini Huracán GT3's refuelling hose restrictor was shortened by 1.5 mm (0.059 in).

Before the race, Oliver Gavin and Tommy Milner led the GTLM Drivers' Championship with 264 points, ahead of Ryan Briscoe and Richard Westbrook in second by 13 points. With 243 points, Alessandro Balzan and Christina Nielsen led the GTD Drivers' Championship, 15 points ahead of Andy Lally and John Potter. Chevrolet and Audi were leading their respective Manufacturers' Championships, while Corvette Racing, and Scuderia Corsa each led their own Teams' Championships.

=== Entry list ===
Twenty-one cars were officially entered for the Michelin GT Challenge at VIR, with most of the entries being in the Grand Touring Daytona (GTD) category. GTLM was represented by nine entries from five different brands. In the list of GTD entrants, twelve GT3-specification vehicles were represented by six different manufacturers. Alex Job Racing's No. 22 and Park Place Motorsports No. 73 Porsche's withdrew over balance of performance concerns. Although it was listed as an entrant, Black Swan Racing's No. 540 car was withdrawn due to family obligations for Tim Pappas. With the absence of the Prototype (P) and Prototype Challenge (PC) classes from the field, only two racing classes were represented in Virginia International Raceway.

== Practice ==
There were three practice sessions preceding the start of the race on Sunday, two on Friday and one on Saturday. The first two one-hour sessions were on Friday morning and afternoon. The third on Saturday morning lasted an hour.

In the first practice session, Bamber's No. 912 Porsche 911 RSR lapped quickest at 1:43.232, 0.018 seconds ahead of Joey hand in the No. 66 CGR car. García was third fastest in Corvette Racing's No. 3 car, Briscoe's No. 67 Ford GT placed fourth and Giancarlo Fisichella's Risi Ferrari rounded out the top five. Lamborghini paced GTD with Paul Miller's Huracán of Madison Snow lapping 1:45.722, ahead of Spencer Pumpelly's Change Lamborghini. The session had two stoppages. The first was when the No. 25 Team RLL BMW M6 GTLM lost its roof on track. A spin by Davis' No. 6 Stevenson Audi into the turn-fifteen barriers gave right-side damage and caused the second stoppage.

The second practice session saw García lap quickest for Corvette at 1:42.623. Ford were second and third after laps by Hand and Briscoe. GTD saw Bryan Sellers No. 48 Paul Miller Lamborghini record the quickest class lap: 1:44.944, 0.165 seconds faster than Bleekemolen's second-placed No. 33 Riley Motorsport Viper.

In the last practice session, Magnussen went fastest for Corvette at 1:41.637. Müller's No. 66 CGR car was second, followed by RLL's Werner in third. Risi were fourth after a lap by Fisichella, and Westbrook No. 67 CGR Ford GT rounded out the top five. Lamborghini took the first two GTD positions, led by Paul Miller's No. 48 car driven by Snow (whose benchmark time of 1:43.864 was 0.262 seconds quicker than Corey Lewis' No. 16 Change Lamborghini).

== Qualifying ==
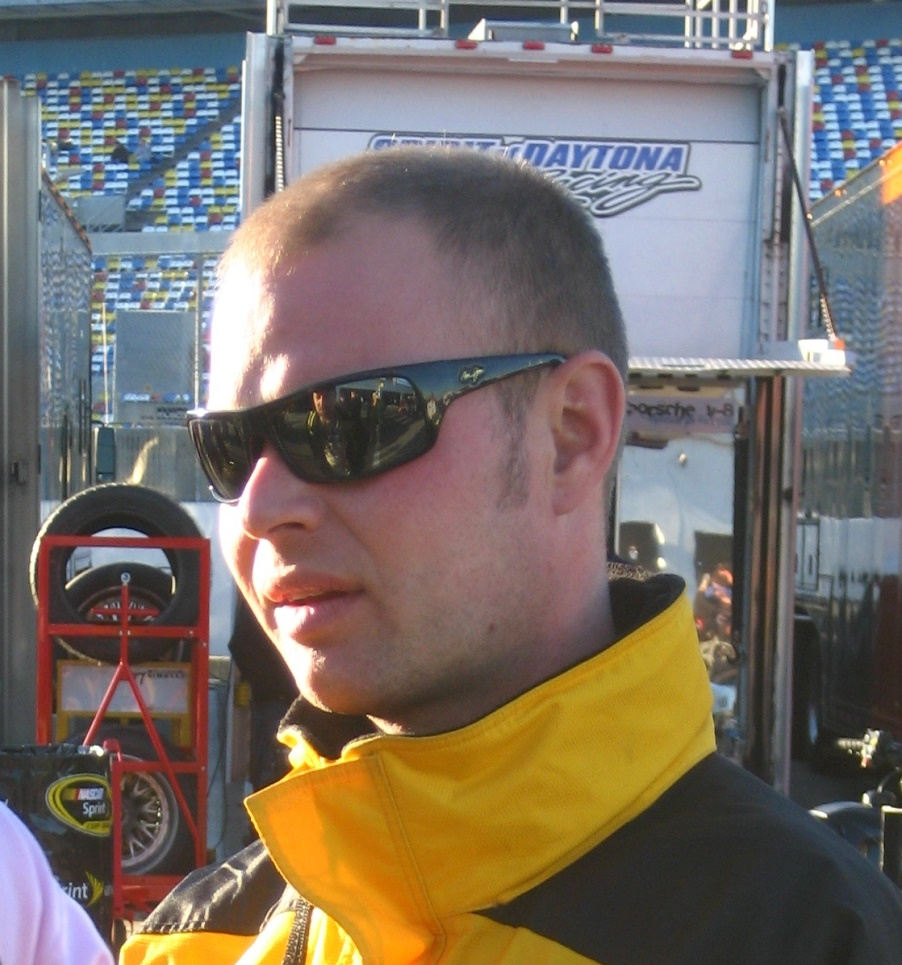
Jan Magnussen (pictured in 2009) took the overall pole position for Corvette Racing.

Saturday afternoon's 40-minute two-group qualifying session gave 15-minute sessions to all categories. Cars in GTD were sent out first before those grouped in GTLM had a separate identically timed session. Regulations stipulated teams to nominate one qualifying driver, with the fastest laps determining each classes starting order. IMSA would arranged the grid to put all GTLMs ahead of the GTD cars.

Magnussen in the No. 3 Corvette set a new category track record, and his took first pole position since the 2014 Tequila Patrón Sports Car Showcase with a lap of 1 minute, 41.557 seconds. He was joined on the grid's front row by Milner whose best lap in the sister No. 4 Corvette was 0.011 seconds slower. Hand's No. 66 Ford took third followed by Giancarlo Fisichella's Risi car in fourth. John Edwards' No. 100 Team RLL BMW M6 started from fifth place.

In GTD, Madison Snow took pole position in PMR's No. 48 Lamborghini with a 1 minute, 44.956 time. Matt Bell's No. 9 Stevenson Motorsports Audi R8 LMS qualified second, and Cédric Sbirrazzuoli's No. 27 Dream Racing took third. Rounding out the top five in class were the No. 6 Stevenson Motorsport Audi of Andrew Davis in fourth, and Corey Lewis' No. 16 Change Racing Lamborghini Huracán GT3.

=== Qualifying results ===
Pole positions in each class are indicated in bold and by ‡.

| Pos. | Class | No. | Team | Driver | Time | Gap | Grid |
|---|---|---|---|---|---|---|---|
| 1 | **GTLM** | **3** | **(United States) Corvette Racing** | **(Denmark) Jan Magnussen** | **1:41.557** | **_** | 1‡ |
| 2 | GTLM | 4 | (United States) Corvette Racing | (United States) Tommy Milner | 1:41.568 | +0.011 | 2 |
| 3 | GTLM | 66 | (United States) Ford Chip Ganassi Racing | (United States) Joey Hand | 1:41.817 | +0.260 | 3 |
| 4 | GTLM | 62 | (United States) Risi Competizione | (Italy) Giancarlo Fisichella | 1:42.225 | +0.668 | 4 |
| 5 | GTLM | 100 | (United States) BMW Team RLL | (United States) John Edwards | 1:42.227 | +0.670 | 5 |
| 6 | GTLM | 25 | (United States) BMW Team RLL | (Germany) Dirk Werner | 1:42.255 | +0.698 | 6 |
| 7 | GTLM | 911 | (United States) Porsche North America | (United Kingdom) Nick Tandy | 1:42.276 | +0.719 | 7 |
| 8 | GTLM | 67 | (United States) Ford Chip Ganassi Racing | (United Kingdom) Richard Westbrook | 1:42.314 | +0.757 | 21^{1} |
| 9 | GTLM | 912 | (United States) Porsche North America | (France) Frédéric Makowiecki | 1:42.372 | +0.815 | 8 |
| 10 | **GTD** | **48** | **(United States) Paul Miller Racing** | **(United States) Madison Snow** | **1:44.956** | **+3.399** | 9‡ |
| 11 | GTD | 9 | (United States) Stevenson Motorsports | (United States) Matt Bell | 1:45.247 | +3.690 | 10 |
| 12 | GTD | 27 | (United States) Dream Racing | (Monaco) Cédric Sbirrazzuoli | 1:45.251 | +3.694 | 11 |
| 13 | GTD | 6 | (United States) Stevenson Motorsports | (United States) Andrew Davis | 1:45.302 | +3.745 | 12 |
| 14 | GTD | 16 | (United States) Change Racing | (United States) Corey Lewis | 1:45.372 | +3.815 | 13 |
| 15 | GTD | 23 | (United States) Team Seattle/Alex Job Racing | (Germany) Mario Farnbacher | 1:45.563 | +4.006 | 20^{1} |
| 16 | GTD | 33 | (United States) Riley Motorsports | (United States) Ben Keating | 1:45.680 | +4.123 | 14 |
| 17 | GTD | 63 | (United States) Scuderia Corsa | (Denmark) Christina Nielsen | 1:45.997 | +4.440 | 15 |
| 18 | GTD | 97 | (United States) Turner Motorsport | (United States) Michael Marsal | 1:46.236 | +4.679 | 16 |
| 19 | GTD | 96 | (United States) Turner Motorsport | (United States) Bret Curtis | 1:46.431 | +4.874 | 17 |
| 20 | GTD | 44 | (United States) Magnus Racing | (United States) John Potter | 1:46.559 | +5.002 | 18 |
| 21 | GTD | 80 | (United States) Lone Star Racing | (United States) Dan Knox | 1:48.115 | +6.558 | 19^{1} |
Sources:

- ^{1} The No. 23 AJR, No. 67 CGR, and No. 80 Lone Star Racing entries were sent to the rear of their respective class fields as per 40.1.5 of the Sporting regulations (Tire change).

== Race ==
=== Post race ===
With a total of 287 points, Gavin and Milner's ninth-place finish finished allowed them to keep their advantage in the GTLM Drivers' Championship, but their advantage was reduced to 7 points over Briscoe and Westbrook. Bamber and Makowiecki advanced from sixth to fourth. The final results of GTD allowed Balzan and Nielsen to extend their advantage in the GTD Drivers' Championship to 20 points as Bleekemolen and Keating jumped to second. Lally and Potter dropped from second to sixth. Chevrolet and Audi continued to top their respective Manufactures' Championships, while Corvette Racing and Scuderia Corsa kept their respective advantages in their of Teams' Championships with two rounds left in the season.

=== Race results ===
Class winners are denoted in bold and ‡. GTLM stands for Grand Touring Le Mans and GTD (Grand Touring Daytona).

Final race classification
| Pos | Class | No. | Team | Drivers | Chassis | Tire | Laps | Time/Retired |
| Pos | Class | No. | Team | Drivers | Engine | Tire | Laps | Time/Retired |
|---|---|---|---|---|---|---|---|---|
| 1 | **GTLM** | **3** | **(United States) Corvette Racing** | **(Spain) Antonio García (Denmark) Jan Magnussen** | **Chevrolet Corvette C7.R** | MI | **90** | **2:40:13.166‡** |
| 1 | **GTLM** | **3** | **(United States) Corvette Racing** | **(Spain) Antonio García (Denmark) Jan Magnussen** | **Chevrolet LT5.5 5.5 L V8** | MI | **90** | **2:40:13.166‡** |
| 2 | GTLM | 66 | (United States) Ford Chip Ganassi Racing | (Germany) Dirk Müller (United States) Joey Hand | Ford GT | MI | 90 | +0.802 |
| 2 | GTLM | 66 | (United States) Ford Chip Ganassi Racing | (Germany) Dirk Müller (United States) Joey Hand | Ford EcoBoost 3.5 L Twin-turbo V6 | MI | 90 | +0.802 |
| 3 | GTLM | 912 | (United States) Porsche North America | (New Zealand) Earl Bamber (France) Frédéric Makowiecki | Porsche 911 RSR | MI | 90 | +1.448 |
| 3 | GTLM | 912 | (United States) Porsche North America | (New Zealand) Earl Bamber (France) Frédéric Makowiecki | Porsche 4.0 L Flat-6 | MI | 90 | +1.448 |
| 4 | GTLM | 67 | (United States) Ford Chip Ganassi Racing | (Australia) Ryan Briscoe (United Kingdom) Richard Westbrook | Ford GT | MI | 90 | +6.004 |
| 4 | GTLM | 67 | (United States) Ford Chip Ganassi Racing | (Australia) Ryan Briscoe (United Kingdom) Richard Westbrook | Ford EcoBoost 3.5 L Twin-turbo V6 | MI | 90 | +6.004 |
| 5 | GTLM | 25 | (United States) BMW Team RLL | (United States) Bill Auberlen (Germany) Dirk Werner | BMW M6 GTLM | MI | 90 | +6.243 |
| 5 | GTLM | 25 | (United States) BMW Team RLL | (United States) Bill Auberlen (Germany) Dirk Werner | BMW 4.4 L Turbo V8 | MI | 90 | +6.243 |
| 6 | GTLM | 911 | (United States) Porsche North America | (France) Patrick Pilet (United Kingdom) Nick Tandy | Porsche 911 RSR | MI | 90 | +7.168 |
| 6 | GTLM | 911 | (United States) Porsche North America | (France) Patrick Pilet (United Kingdom) Nick Tandy | Porsche 4.0 L Flat-6 | MI | 90 | +7.168 |
| 7 | GTLM | 62 | (United States) Risi Competizione | (Finland) Toni Vilander (Italy) Giancarlo Fisichella | Ferrari 488 GTE | MI | 90 | +25.016 |
| 7 | GTLM | 62 | (United States) Risi Competizione | (Finland) Toni Vilander (Italy) Giancarlo Fisichella | Ferrari F154CB 3.9 L Turbo V8 | MI | 90 | +25.016 |
| 8 | GTLM | 100 | (United States) BMW Team RLL | (United States) John Edwards (Germany) Lucas Luhr | BMW M6 GTLM | MI | 89 | +1 Lap |
| 8 | GTLM | 100 | (United States) BMW Team RLL | (United States) John Edwards (Germany) Lucas Luhr | BMW 4.4 L Turbo V8 | MI | 89 | +1 Lap |
| 9 | **GTD** | **48** | **(United States) Paul Miller Racing** | **(United States) Bryan Sellers (United States) Madison Snow** | **Lamborghini Huracán GT3** | C | **88** | **+2 Laps‡** |
| 9 | **GTD** | **48** | **(United States) Paul Miller Racing** | **(United States) Bryan Sellers (United States) Madison Snow** | **Lamborghini 5.2 L V10** | C | **88** | **+2 Laps‡** |
| 10 | GTD | 9 | (United States) Stevenson Motorsports | (United States) Lawson Aschenbach (United States) Matt Bell | Audi R8 LMS | C | 88 | +2 Laps |
| 10 | GTD | 9 | (United States) Stevenson Motorsports | (United States) Lawson Aschenbach (United States) Matt Bell | Audi 5.2L V10 | C | 88 | +2 Laps |
| 11 | GTD | 6 | (United States) Stevenson Motorsports | (United States) Andrew Davis (United Kingdom) Robin Liddell | Audi R8 LMS | C | 88 | +2 Laps |
| 11 | GTD | 6 | (United States) Stevenson Motorsports | (United States) Andrew Davis (United Kingdom) Robin Liddell | Audi 5.2L V10 | C | 88 | +2 Laps |
| 12 | GTD | 23 | (United States) Team Seattle/Alex Job Racing | (Germany) Mario Farnbacher (Spain) Alex Riberas | Porsche 911 GT3 R | C | 88 | +2 Laps |
| 12 | GTD | 23 | (United States) Team Seattle/Alex Job Racing | (Germany) Mario Farnbacher (Spain) Alex Riberas | Porsche 4.0 L Flat-6 | C | 88 | +2 Laps |
| 13 | GTD | 16 | (United States) Change Racing | (United States) Corey Lewis (United States) Spencer Pumpelly | Lamborghini Huracán GT3 | C | 87 | +3 Laps |
| 13 | GTD | 16 | (United States) Change Racing | (United States) Corey Lewis (United States) Spencer Pumpelly | Lamborghini 5.2 L V10 | C | 87 | +3 Laps |
| 14 | GTD | 33 | (United States) Riley Motorsports | (Netherlands) Jeroen Bleekemolen (United States) Ben Keating | Dodge Viper GT3-R | C | 87 | +3 Laps |
| 14 | GTD | 33 | (United States) Riley Motorsports | (Netherlands) Jeroen Bleekemolen (United States) Ben Keating | Dodge 8.3L V10 | C | 87 | +3 Laps |
| 15 | GTD | 63 | (United States) Scuderia Corsa | (Denmark) Christina Nielsen (Italy) Alessandro Balzan | Ferrari 488 GT3 | C | 87 | +3 Laps |
| 15 | GTD | 63 | (United States) Scuderia Corsa | (Denmark) Christina Nielsen (Italy) Alessandro Balzan | Ferrari F154CB 3.9 L Turbo V8 | C | 87 | +3 Laps |
| 16 | GTD | 97 | (United States) Turner Motorsport | (United States) Michael Marsal (Finland) Markus Palttala | BMW M6 GT3 | C | 87 | +3 Laps |
| 16 | GTD | 97 | (United States) Turner Motorsport | (United States) Michael Marsal (Finland) Markus Palttala | BMW 4.4L Turbo V8 | C | 87 | +3 Laps |
| 17 | GTLM | 4 | (United States) Corvette Racing | (United Kingdom) Oliver Gavin (United States) Tommy Milner | Chevrolet Corvette C7.R | MI | 86 | +4 Laps |
| 17 | GTLM | 4 | (United States) Corvette Racing | (United Kingdom) Oliver Gavin (United States) Tommy Milner | Chevrolet LT5.5 5.5 L V8 | MI | 86 | +4 Laps |
| 18 | GTD | 80 | (United States) Lone Star Racing | (United States) Dan Knox (United States) Mike Skeen | Dodge Viper GT3-R | C | 84 | +6 Laps |
| 18 | GTD | 80 | (United States) Lone Star Racing | (United States) Dan Knox (United States) Mike Skeen | Dodge 8.3L V10 | C | 84 | +6 Laps |
| 19 | GTD | 27 | (United States) Dream Racing | (Monaco) Cédric Sbirrazzuoli (Italy) Luca Persiani | Lamborghini Huracán GT3 | C | 75 | +15 Laps |
| 19 | GTD | 27 | (United States) Dream Racing | (Monaco) Cédric Sbirrazzuoli (Italy) Luca Persiani | Lamborghini 5.2 L V10 | C | 75 | +15 Laps |
| 20 DNF | GTD | 96 | (United States) Turner Motorsport | (United States) Bret Curtis (Germany) Jens Klingmann | BMW M6 GT3 | C | 25 | Did Not Finish |
| 20 DNF | GTD | 96 | (United States) Turner Motorsport | (United States) Bret Curtis (Germany) Jens Klingmann | BMW 4.4L Turbo V8 | C | 25 | Did Not Finish |
| DSQ | GTD | 44 | (United States) Magnus Racing | (United States) John Potter (United States) Andy Lally | Audi R8 LMS | C | 88 | Excluded |
| DSQ | GTD | 44 | (United States) Magnus Racing | (United States) John Potter (United States) Andy Lally | Audi 5.2L V10 | C | 88 | Excluded |

Tyre manufacturers
Key
| Symbol | Tyre manufacturer |
|---|---|
| **C** | Continental |
| **MI** | Michelin |

== Championship standings after the race ==
Prototype Drivers' Championship standings
| Pos. | +/– | Driver | Points |
|---|---|---|---|
| 1 | | (Portugal) João Barbosa (Brazil) Christian Fittipaldi | 253 |
| 2 | | (United States) Eric Curran (United States) Dane Cameron | 252 |
| 3 | | (United States) Jordan Taylor (United States) Ricky Taylor | 242 |
| 4 | | (Belgium) Marc Goossens | 223 |
| 5 | | (Brazil) Oswaldo Negri Jr. | 220 |

PC Drivers' Championship standings
| Pos. | +/– | Driver | Points |
|---|---|---|---|
| 1 | | (Venezuela) Alex Popow (Netherlands) Renger van der Zande | 293 |
| 2 | | (United States) Robert Alon (United Kingdom) Tom Kimber-Smith | 286 |
| 3 | | (South Africa) Stephen Simpson (Canada) Misha Goikhberg | 260 |
| 4 | | (United States) Jon Bennett (United States) Colin Braun | 245 |
| 5 | | (United States) James French (Canada) Kyle Marcelli | 241 |

GTLM Drivers' Championship standings
| Pos. | +/– | Driver | Points |
|---|---|---|---|
| 1 | | (United Kingdom) Oliver Gavin (United States) Tommy Milner | 287 |
| 2 | | (Australia) Ryan Briscoe (United Kingdom) Richard Westbrook | 280 |
| 3 | | (Spain) Antonio García (Denmark) Jan Magnussen | 259 |
| 4 | 2 | (New Zealand) Earl Bamber (France) Frédéric Makowiecki | 250 |
| 5 | | (United States) Bill Auberlen (Germany) Dirk Werner | 246 |

GTD Drivers' Championship standings
| Pos. | +/– | Driver | Points |
|---|---|---|---|
| 1 | | (Italy) Alessandro Balzan (Denmark) Christina Nielsen | 268 |
| 2 | 1 | (Netherlands) Jeroen Bleekemolen (United States) Ben Keating | 248 |
| 3 | 1 | (United States) Andrew Davis (United Kingdom) Robin Liddell | 243 |
| 4 | 1 | (Germany) Mario Farnbacher (Spain) Alex Riberas | 236 |
| 5 | 2 | (United States) Bryan Sellers (United States) Madison Snow | 231 |

- Note: Only the top five positions are included for all sets of standings.

Prototype Teams' Championship standings
| Pos. | +/– | Team | Points |
|---|---|---|---|
| 1 | | (United States) No. 5 Action Express Racing | 253 |
| 2 | | (United States) No. 31 Action Express Racing | 252 |
| 3 | | (United States) No. 10 Wayne Taylor Racing | 242 |
| 4 | | (United States) No. 90 VisitFlorida Racing | 223 |
| 5 | | (United States) No. 60 Michael Shank Racing with Curb-Agajanian | 220 |

PC Teams' Championship standings
| Pos. | +/– | Team | Points |
|---|---|---|---|
| 1 | | (United States) No. 8 Starworks Motorsport | 293 |
| 2 | | (United States) No. 52 PR1/Mathiasen Motorsports | 286 |
| 3 | | (United States) No. 54 CORE Autosport | 268 |
| 4 | | (United States) No. 85 JDC-Miller MotorSports | 266 |
| 5 | | (United States) No. 38 Performance Tech Motorsports | 260 |

GTLM Teams' Championship standings
| Pos. | +/– | Team | Points |
|---|---|---|---|
| 1 | | (United States) No. 4 Corvette Racing | 287 |
| 2 | | (United States) No. 67 Ford Chip Ganassi Racing | 280 |
| 3 | | (United States) No. 3 Corvette Racing | 259 |
| 4 | 2 | (United States) No. 912 Porsche North America | 250 |
| 5 | | (United States) No. 25 BMW Team RLL | 246 |

GTD Teams' Championship standings
| Pos. | +/– | Team | Points |
|---|---|---|---|
| 1 | | (United States) No. 63 Scuderia Corsa | 268 |
| 2 | 1 | (United States) No. 33 Riley Motorsports | 243 |
| 3 | 1 | (United States) No. 6 Stevenson Motorsports | 236 |
| 4 | 1 | (United States) No. 23 Team Seattle/Alex Job Racing | 231 |
| 5 | 2 | (United States) No. 48 Paul Miller Racing | 228 |

- Note: Only the top five positions are included for all sets of standings.

Prototype Manufacturers' Championship standings
| Pos. | +/– | Manufacturer | Points |
|---|---|---|---|
| 1 | | (United States) Chevrolet | 271 |
| 2 | | (Japan) Honda | 259 |
| 3 | | (Japan) Mazda | 242 |
| 4 | | (Germany) BMW | 56 |
| 5 | | (United States) Ford | 30 |

GTLM Manufacturers' Championship standings
| Pos. | +/– | Manufacturer | Points |
|---|---|---|---|
| 1 | | (United States) Chevrolet | 297 |
| 2 | | (United States) Ford | 281 |
| 3 | | (Germany) Porsche | 267 |
| 4 | | (Germany) BMW | 258 |
| 5 | | (Italy) Ferrari | 256 |

GTD Manufacturers' Championship standings
| Pos. | +/– | Manufacturer | Points |
|---|---|---|---|
| 1 | | (Germany) Audi | 280 |
| 2 | | (Germany) Porsche | 271 |
| 3 | | (Italy) Ferrari | 266 |
| 4 | | (United States) Dodge | 262 |
| 5 | | (Germany) BMW | 248 |

- Note: Only the top five positions are included for all sets of standings.

IMSA SportsCar Championship
| Previous race: Continental Tire Road Race Showcase | 2016 season | Next race: Lone Star Le Mans |
