= BMW M6 GTLM =

Sport car made by BMW

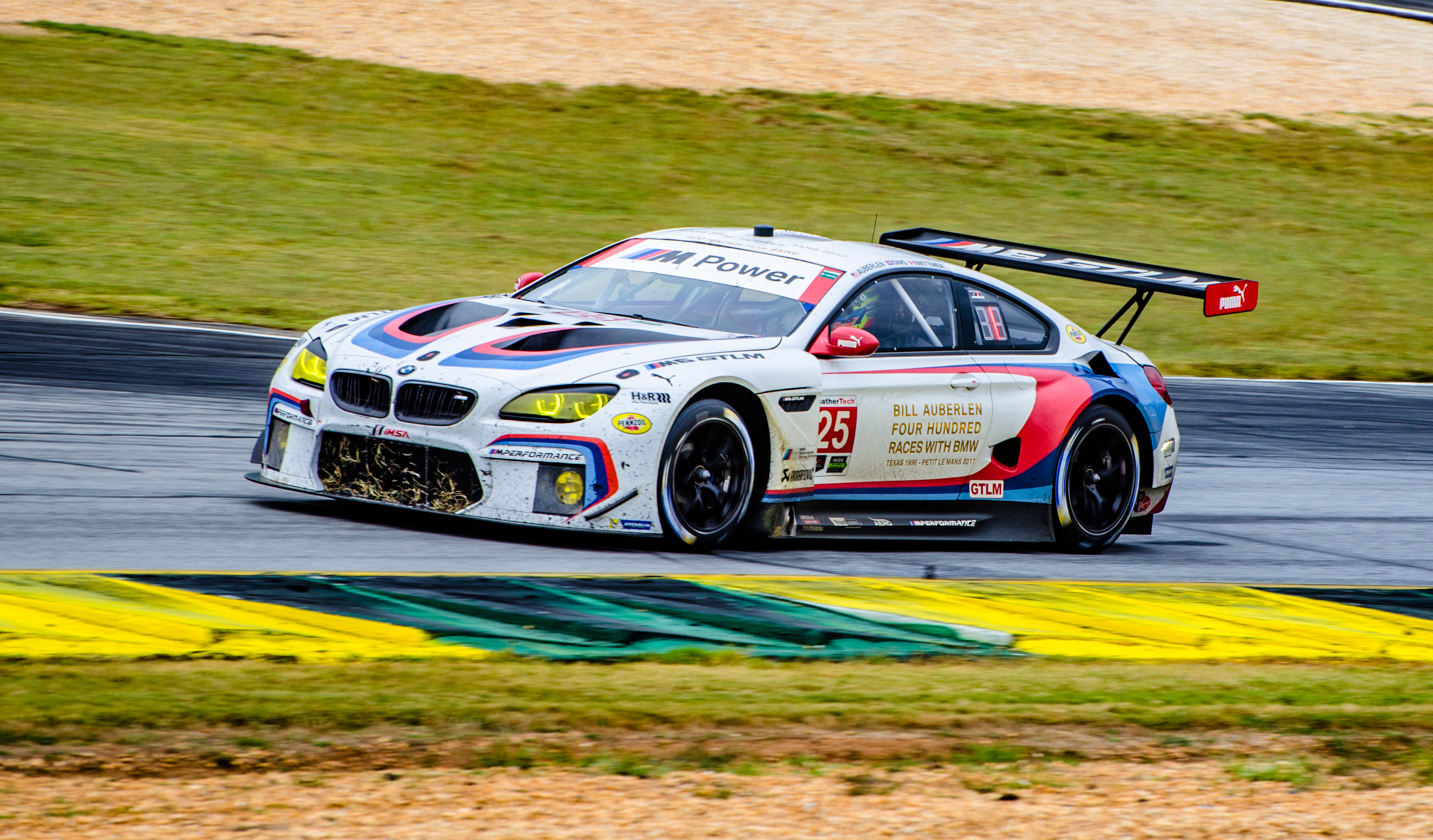
- The No. 25 M6 GTLM of BMW Team RLL during the 2017 Petit Le Mans.
- Category: GT Endurance (IMSA WeatherTech SportsCar GTLM)
- Constructor: BMW
- Predecessor: BMW Z4 GTE
- Successor: BMW M8 GTE

Technical specifications
- Chassis: Steel chassis with safety roll cage
- Suspension (front): Pushrod with double wishbones coupled with ZF Sachs dampers
- Suspension (rear): Same as front
- Length: 4,944 mm (195 in) excluding rear wing
- Width: 2,046 mm (81 in)
- Height: 1,212 mm (48 in)
- Wheelbase: 2,910 mm (115 in)
- Engine: BMW S63B44 4,395 cc (268 cu in) 90° V8 twin-turbocharged, front engine, longitudinally mounted
- Transmission: Xtrac 6-speed sequential semi-automatic paddle-shift
- Power: 580 PS (427 kW; 572 hp) at 7,000 rpm (estimated)
- Weight: 1,250 kg (2,756 lb) including driver
- Fuel: VP Racing Fuels
- Lubricants: Pennzoil
- Brakes: AP Racing carbon brake discs with 6-piston calipers and pads
- Tyres: Michelin

Competition history
- Notable entrants: (United States) BMW Team Rahal Letterman Lanigan
- Notable drivers: (United States) Bill Auberlen (Germany) Dirk Werner (Canada) Bruno Spengler (Brazil) Augusto Farfus (United States) John Edwards (Germany) Lucas Luhr (Canada) Kuno Wittmer (United States) Graham Rahal (Germany) Martin Tomczyk (Netherlands) Nicky Catsburg (United Kingdom) Alexander Sims
- Debut: 2016 24 Hours of Daytona
- First win: 2017 6 Hours of The Glen
- Last win: 2017 Petit Le Mans
- Last event: 2017 Petit Le Mans
Races	Wins	Podiums	Poles	F/Laps
22	4	11	3	4
- Constructors' Championships: 0
- Drivers' Championships: 0

The BMW M6 GTLM is an endurance grand tourer (GT) car constructed by the German automobile manufacturer BMW. The car was announced to be under development, through a press release in October 2015, following the announcement and unveiling of the BMW M6 GT3, although few of the car's technical specifications were revealed. The car was based on the BMW M6 GT3, and the car had its initial shakedown and testing conducted by BMW Team RLL, at the Sebring International Raceway, in Florida, during early November 2015. The car had its race debut at the 2016 24 Hours of Daytona with BMW Team RLL.

== Development ==
The BMW M6 GTLM was built and developed by BMW Motorsport in Germany, the new-generation GT contender marked a significant departure from its predecessor, the Z4 GTE, both in appearance and performance, with virtually zero carryover between the two cars. The car featured a significantly greater wheelbase, at 2910mm for the M6, compared to the 2512mm wheelbase of the Z4, increasing its stability. The car was a development of the BMW M6 GT3, with the key differences between the GT3 and GTLM versions of the car being the rear wing and brakes, as well as some electronics. The BMW M6 GTLM would be eligible for competition in only the IMSA WeatherTech SportsCar Championship.

== Competition history ==
=== Complete IMSA SportsCar Championship results ===
(key) Races in bold indicates pole position. Races in italics indicates fastest lap.

Year	Entrant	Class	Drivers	No.	Rds.	Rounds											Pts.	Pos.
Year	Entrant	Class	Drivers	No.	Rds.	1	2	3	4	5	6	7	8	9	10	11	Pts.	Pos.
2016	(United States) BMW Team RLL	GTLM	(United States) Bill Auberlen (Germany) Dirk Werner (Canada) Bruno Spengler (Brazil) Augusto Farfus	25	All; All; 1-2; 1, 12	DAY; 5	**SEB**; **2**	**LBH**; **5**	LGA; 9	WGL; 3	MOS; 4	LIM; 7	ELK; 8	VIR; 5	COA; 4	PET; 9	7th	298
2016	(United States) BMW Team RLL	GTLM	(United States) John Edwards (Germany) Lucas Luhr (Canada) Kuno Wittmer (United States) Graham Rahal	100	All; All; 1-2, 12; 1	DAY; 11	SEB; 6	LBH; 10	LGA; 10	WGL; 8	MOS; 9	LIM; 9	ELK; 3	VIR; 8	COA; 7	PET; 6	9th	267
2017	(United States) BMW Team RLL	GTLM	(United States) John Edwards (Germany) Martin Tomczyk (Netherlands) Nicky Catsburg (Canada) Kuno Wittmer	24	All; All; 1-2; 1, 12	DAY; 11	SEB; 9	LBH; 7	**COA**; **3**	WGL; 8	MOS; 2	LIM; 3	ELK; 7	VIR; 9	LGA; 1	PET; 9	7th	284
2017	(United States) BMW Team RLL	GTLM	(United States) Bill Auberlen (United Kingdom) Alexander Sims (Brazil) Augusto Farfus (Canada) Bruno Spengler (Canada) Kuno Wittmer (Netherlands) Nicky Catsburg	25	All; All; 1; 1; 2; 12	DAY; 8	SEB; 6	LBH; 4	COA; 2	WGL; 1	MOS; 1	LIM; 6	ELK; 6	VIR; 4	LGA; 7	PET; 1	2nd	317
