= 2016 Northeast Grand Prix =

Eighth round of the 2016 IMSA SportsCar Championship season

Track map of Lime Rock Park

The 2016 Northeast Grand Prix was a sports car race sanctioned by the International Motor Sports Association (IMSA). The race was held at Lime Rock Park in Lakeville, Connecticut on July 23, 2016. The race was the eighth round of the 2016 IMSA SportsCar Championship.

== Background ==
=== Preview ===
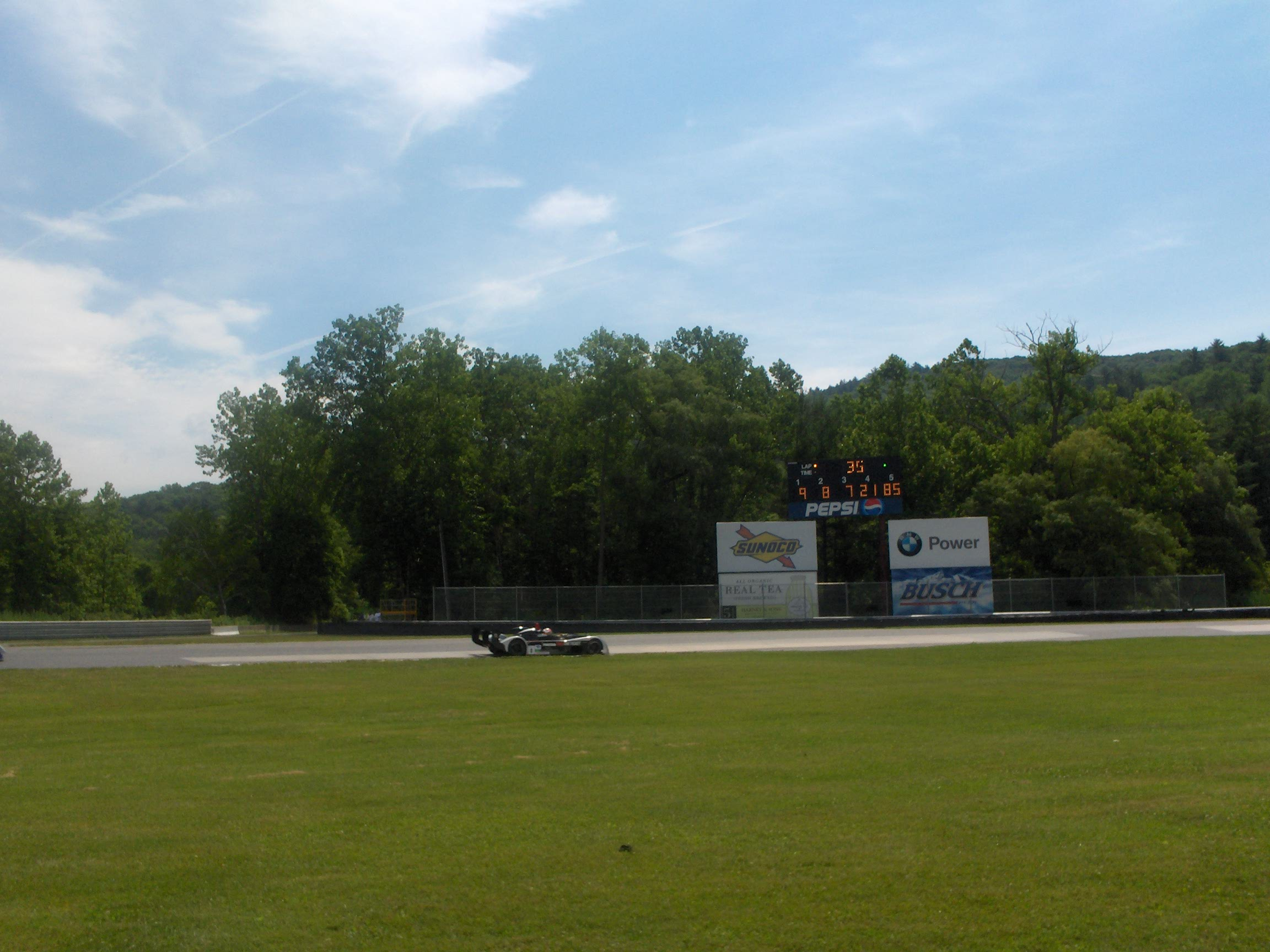
Lime Rock Park, where the race was held.

International Motor Sports Association (IMSA) president Scott Atherton confirmed the race was part of the schedule for the 2016 IMSA SportsCar Championship (IMSA SCC) in August 2015. It was the second consecutive year the event was held as part of the WeatherTech SportsCar Championship and the twenty-fifth annual running of the race. The 2016 Northeast Grand Prix was the eighth of twelve scheduled sports car races of 2016 by IMSA, and was the fifth round not held on the held as part of the North American Endurance Cup. The race was held at the seven-turn 1.530 mi (2.462 km) Lime Rock Park in Lakeville, Connecticut on July 23, 2016. The GTLM category would participate in the event for the first time since the 2013 running.

IMSA altered the balance of performance to try to create parity within the GTLM category. The BMW M6 GTLM received a reduction in turbo boost pressure and a 2-litre fuel capacity reduction. The Ferrari 488 GTE received an increase in turbo boost pressure, and a 2-litre fuel capacity increase as well as a 1.0 mm refuelling hose restrictor reduction increase. The Ford GT received a 0.1 mm refuelling hose restrictor reduction. The Porsche 911 RSR had its weight increased by 20 kg (44 lb).

Before the race, Alex Popow and Renger van der Zande led the Prototype Challenge Drivers' Championship with 231 points, ahead of Robert Alon and Tom Kimber-Smith in second by 14 points, and Stephen Simpson and Misha Goikhberg in third with 209 points. With 192 points, Oliver Gavin and Tommy Milner led the GTLM Drivers' Championship, 5 points ahead of Ryan Briscoe and Richard Westbrook. In GTD, the Drivers' Championship was led by Alessandro Balzan and Christina Nielsen with 191 points; the duo held a twenty two-point advantage over Mario Farnbacher and Alex Riberas. Chevrolet and Ferrari were leading their respective Manufacturers' Championships, while Starworks Motorsport, Corvette Racing, and Scuderia Corsa each led their own Teams' Championships.

=== Entry list ===
Thirty-one cars were officially entered for the Northeast Grand Prix, with most of the entries being in the Grand Touring Le Mans (GTLM) and Grand Touring Daytona (GTD) categories. The Prototype Challenge (PC) class was composed of eight Oreca FLM09 cars: three from Starworks Motorsports. BAR1 Motorsports, CORE Autosport, JDC-Miller MotorSports, Performance Tech and PR1/Mathiasen Motorsports entered one car each. GTLM was represented by nine entries from five different brands. In the list of GTD entrants, fourteen GT3-specification vehicles were represented by six different manufacturers. With the absence of the Prototype (P) class from the field, only three racing classes were represented in Lime Rock.

== Practice ==
There were two practice sessions preceding the start of the race on Saturday, both on Friday. The two one-hour sessions were on Friday afternoon.

In the first practice session, Renger van der Zande set the fastest time in the No. 8 Starworks car with a time of 48.808 seconds, 0.214 seconds faster than Colin Braun's No. 54 CORE Autosport vehicle, and Stephen Simpson's No. 85 car was third. The GTLM class was topped by the No. 4 Chevrolet Corvette C7.R of Oliver Gavin. Joey Hand in the No. 66 Ford GT was second and Toni Vilander's Risi Ferrari was third. Audi paced GTD with Magnus Racing's R8 of Lally lapping at 52.807, followed by Jens Klingmann's No. 96 Turner Motorsport BMW M6. The session was stopped for 10 minutes when John Edwards No.100 RLL BMW M6 stopped on track due to a driveline failure.

Braun led the final practice session in CORE's No. 54 car with a lap of 48.990 seconds. Kimber-Smith's No. 52 PR/1's vehicle was second fastest. Marcelli was third fastest for Performance Tech. BMW topped GTLM with Werner's No. 25 car lapping at 51.164 seconds. Vilander was second fastest for Risi Competizione and Milner's No. 4 Corvette was third. Farnbacher led the GTD class in the No. 23 Porsche, followed by Liddell's No. 6 Stevenson Motorsport Audi R8.

== Qualifying ==
Friday afternoon's 65-minute three-group qualifying session gave 15-minute sessions to all categories. Cars in GTD were sent out first before those grouped in GTLM, and PC had two separate identically timed sessions. Regulations stipulated teams to nominate one qualifying driver, with the fastest laps determining each classes starting order. IMSA would arranged the grid to put all PCs ahead of the GTLM, and GTD cars.

=== Qualifying results ===
Pole positions in each class are indicated in bold and by ‡.

Pos.	Class	No.	Team	Driver	Time	Gap	Grid
1	PC	54	(United States) CORE Autosport	(United States) Colin Braun	48.824	_	8^{1}
2	**PC**	**52**	**(United States) PR1/Mathiasen Motorsports**	**(United States) Robert Alon**	**48.840**	**+0.016**	1‡
3	PC	38	(United States) Performance Tech Motorsports	(United States) James French	48.930	+0.106	2
4	PC	7	(United States) Starworks Motorsport	(Mexico) José Gutiérrez	48.978	+0.154	3
5	PC	8	(United States) Starworks Motorsport	(Venezuela) Alex Popow	49.222	+0.398	4
6	PC	20	(United States) BAR1 Motorsports	(United States) Matt McMurry	49.266	+0.442	5
7	PC	85	(United States) JDC-Miller MotorSports	(Canada) Misha Goikhberg	49.659	+0.835	6
8	**GTLM**	**67**	**(United States) Ford Chip Ganassi Racing**	**(United Kingdom) Richard Westbrook**	**50.748**	**+1.924**	9‡
9	GTLM	25	(United States) BMW Team RLL	(Germany) Dirk Werner	50.834	+2.010	10
10	GTLM	4	(United States) Corvette Racing	(United States) Tommy Milner	50.858	+2.034	11
11	GTLM	62	(United States) Risi Competizione	(Finland) Toni Vilander	50.902	+2.078	12
12	GTLM	66	(United States) Ford Chip Ganassi Racing	(United States) Joey Hand	51.015	+2.191	13
13	GTLM	3	(United States) Corvette Racing	(Denmark) Jan Magnussen	51.264	+2.440	14
14	GTLM	911	(United States) Porsche North America	(France) Patrick Pilet	51.346	+2.522	15
15	GTLM	100	(United States) BMW Team RLL	(United States) John Edwards	51.431	+2.607	16
16	GTLM	912	(United States) Porsche North America	(France) Frédéric Makowiecki	51.445	+2.621	17
17	PC	88	(United States) Starworks Motorsport	(United States) Mark Kvamme	51.629	+2.805	8
18	**GTD**	**16**	**(United States) Change Racing**	**(United States) Spencer Pumpelly**	**53.178**	**+4.324**	18‡
19	GTD	6	(United States) Stevenson Motorsports	(United States) Andrew Davis	53.222	+4.354	19
20	GTD	9	(United States) Stevenson Motorsports	(United States) Matt Bell	53.250	+4.398	20
21	GTD	63	(United States) Scuderia Corsa	(Denmark) Christina Nielsen	53.250	+4.426	21
22	GTD	48	(United States) Paul Miller Racing	(United States) Madison Snow	53.330	+4.506	22
23	GTD	23	(United States) Team Seattle/Alex Job Racing	(Germany) Mario Farnbacher	53.538	+4.714	23
24	GTD	96	(United States) Turner Motorsport	(United States) Bret Curtis	53.588	+4.764	24
25	GTD	73	(United States) Park Place Motorsports	(United States) Patrick Lindsey	53.609	+4.785	25
26	GTD	27	(United States) Dream Racing	(Monaco) Cédric Sbirrazzuoli	53.680	+4.786	31^{2}
27	GTD	97	(United States) Turner Motorsport	(United States) Michael Marsa	53.695	+4.871	26
28	GTD	44	(United States) Magnus Racing	(United States) John Potter	53.698	+4.874	27
29	GTD	22	(United States) Alex Job Racing	(United States) Cooper MacNeil	53.784	+4.960	28
30	GTD	33	(United States) Riley Motorsports	(United States) Ben Keating	53.983	+5.159	30^{3}
31	GTD	540	(United States) Black Swan Racing	(United States) Tim Pappas	54.949	+6.155	29
Sources:

- ^{1} The No. 54 CORE Autosport entry was sent to the rear of the PC grid as per 43.1 of the Sporting regulations (Starting driver change).
- ^{2} The No. 27 Dream Racing Lamborghini was sent to the rear of the GTD grid as per 43.1 of the Sporting regulations (Starting driver change).
- ^{3} The No. 33 Riley Motorsports Dodge was sent to the rear of the GTD grid as per 40.1.5 of the Sporting regulations (Tire change).

== Race ==
=== Post-race ===
With a total of 267 points, Popow and van der Zande's victory allowed them to extend their advantage in the Prototype Challenge Drivers' Championship to 17 points over Alon and Kimber-Smith. The final results of GTLM meant Gavin and Milner's victory allowed them to extend their advantage in the Drivers' Championship by 5 points over Briscoe and Westbrook. García and Magnussen advanced from fifth to third. Balzan and Nielsen's eleventh-placed finish allowed them to keep their advantage in the GTD Drivers' Championship, but their advantage was reduced to 13 points as race winners Lally and Potter jumped to second. Chevrolet continued to the GTLM Manufactures' Championship while Audi became the leader of the GTD Manufactures' Championship. Starworks Motorsport, Corvette Racing, and Scuderia Corsa kept their respective advantages in their of Teams' Championships with four rounds left in the season.

=== Race results ===
Class winners are denoted in bold and ‡. PC stands for Prototype Challenge, GTLM (Grand Touring Le Mans) and GTD (Grand Touring Daytona)

Final race classification
Pos	Class	No.	Team	Drivers	Chassis	Tire	Laps	Time/Retired
Pos	Class	No.	Team	Drivers	Engine	Tire	Laps	Time/Retired
1	**PC**	**8**	**(United States) Starworks Motorsport**	**(Venezuela) Alex Popow (Netherlands) Renger van der Zande**	**Oreca FLM09**	C	**169**	**2:40:43.254‡**
1	**PC**	**8**	**(United States) Starworks Motorsport**	**(Venezuela) Alex Popow (Netherlands) Renger van der Zande**	**Chevrolet 6.2 L V8**	C	**169**	**2:40:43.254‡**
2	PC	52	(United States) PR1/Mathiasen Motorsports	(United States) Robert Alon (United Kingdom) Tom Kimber-Smith	Oreca FLM09	C	169	+0.815
2	PC	52	(United States) PR1/Mathiasen Motorsports	(United States) Robert Alon (United Kingdom) Tom Kimber-Smith	Chevrolet 6.2 L V8	C	169	+0.815
3	PC	38	(United States) Performance Tech Motorsports	(United States) James French (Canada) Kyle Marcelli	Oreca FLM09	C	168	+1 Lap
3	PC	38	(United States) Performance Tech Motorsports	(United States) James French (Canada) Kyle Marcelli	Chevrolet 6.2 L V8	C	168	+1 Lap
4	PC	20	(United States) BAR1 Motorsports	(United States) Matt McMurry (United Kingdom) Johnny Mowlem	Oreca FLM09	C	168	+1 Lap
4	PC	20	(United States) BAR1 Motorsports	(United States) Matt McMurry (United Kingdom) Johnny Mowlem	Chevrolet 6.2 L V8	C	168	+1 Lap
5	**GTLM**	**4**	**(United States) Corvette Racing**	**(United Kingdom) Oliver Gavin (United States) Tommy Milner**	**Chevrolet Corvette C7.R**	M	**167**	**+2 Laps‡**
5	**GTLM**	**4**	**(United States) Corvette Racing**	**(United Kingdom) Oliver Gavin (United States) Tommy Milner**	**Chevrolet LT5.5 5.5 L V8**	M	**167**	**+2 Laps‡**
6	GTLM	3	(United States) Corvette Racing	(Spain) Antonio García (Denmark) Jan Magnussen	Chevrolet Corvette C7.R	M	167	+2 Laps
6	GTLM	3	(United States) Corvette Racing	(Spain) Antonio García (Denmark) Jan Magnussen	Chevrolet LT5.5 5.5 L V8	M	167	+2 Laps
7	GTLM	67	(United States) Ford Chip Ganassi Racing	(Australia) Ryan Briscoe (United Kingdom) Richard Westbrook	Ford GT	M	167	+2 Laps
7	GTLM	67	(United States) Ford Chip Ganassi Racing	(Australia) Ryan Briscoe (United Kingdom) Richard Westbrook	Ford EcoBoost 3.5 L Twin-turbo V6	M	167	+2 Laps
8	GTLM	62	(United States) Risi Competizione	(Finland) Toni Vilander (Italy) Giancarlo Fisichella	Ferrari 488 GTE	M	167	+2 Laps
8	GTLM	62	(United States) Risi Competizione	(Finland) Toni Vilander (Italy) Giancarlo Fisichella	Ferrari F154CB 3.9 L Turbo V8	M	167	+2 Laps
9	GTLM	66	(United States) Ford Chip Ganassi Racing	(Germany) Dirk Müller (United States) Joey Hand	Ford GT	M	167	+2 Laps
9	GTLM	66	(United States) Ford Chip Ganassi Racing	(Germany) Dirk Müller (United States) Joey Hand	Ford EcoBoost 3.5 L Twin-turbo V6	M	167	+2 Laps
10	PC	88	(United States) Starworks Motorsport	(United States) Mark Kvamme (Canada) Remo Ruscitti	Oreca FLM09	C	165	+4 Laps
10	PC	88	(United States) Starworks Motorsport	(United States) Mark Kvamme (Canada) Remo Ruscitti	Chevrolet 6.2 L V8	C	165	+4 Laps
11	**GTD**	**44**	**(United States) Magnus Racing**	**(United States) John Potter (United States) Andy Lally**	**Audi R8 LMS**	C	**162**	**+7 Laps‡**
11	**GTD**	**44**	**(United States) Magnus Racing**	**(United States) John Potter (United States) Andy Lally**	**Audi 5.2L V10**	C	**162**	**+7 Laps‡**
12	GTD	6	(United States) Stevenson Motorsports	(United States) Andrew Davis (United Kingdom) Robin Liddell	Audi R8 LMS	C	162	+7 Laps
12	GTD	6	(United States) Stevenson Motorsports	(United States) Andrew Davis (United Kingdom) Robin Liddell	Audi 5.2L V10	C	162	+7 Laps
13	GTD	33	(United States) Riley Motorsports	(Netherlands) Jeroen Bleekemolen (United States) Ben Keating	Dodge Viper GT3-R	C	161	+8 Laps
13	GTD	33	(United States) Riley Motorsports	(Netherlands) Jeroen Bleekemolen (United States) Ben Keating	Dodge 8.3L V10	C	161	+8 Laps
14	GTD	48	(United States) Paul Miller Racing	(United States) Bryan Sellers (United States) Madison Snow	Lamborghini Huracán GT3	C	161	+8 Laps
14	GTD	48	(United States) Paul Miller Racing	(United States) Bryan Sellers (United States) Madison Snow	Lamborghini 5.2 L V10	C	161	+8 Laps
15	GTD	9	(United States) Stevenson Motorsports	(United States) Lawson Aschenbach (United States) Matt Bell	Audi R8 LMS	C	161	+8 Laps
15	GTD	9	(United States) Stevenson Motorsports	(United States) Lawson Aschenbach (United States) Matt Bell	Audi 5.2L V10	C	161	+8 Laps
16	GTD	96	(United States) Turner Motorsport	(United States) Bret Curtis (Germany) Jens Klingmann	BMW M6 GT3	C	161	+8 Laps
16	GTD	96	(United States) Turner Motorsport	(United States) Bret Curtis (Germany) Jens Klingmann	BMW 4.4L Turbo V8	C	161	+8 Laps
17	GTD	97	(United States) Turner Motorsport	(United States) Michael Marsal (Finland) Markus Palttala	BMW M6 GT3	C	161	+8 Laps
17	GTD	97	(United States) Turner Motorsport	(United States) Michael Marsal (Finland) Markus Palttala	BMW 4.4L Turbo V8	C	161	+8 Laps
18	GTD	16	(United States) Change Racing	(United States) Corey Lewis (United States) Spencer Pumpelly	Lamborghini Huracán GT3	C	161	+8 Laps
18	GTD	16	(United States) Change Racing	(United States) Corey Lewis (United States) Spencer Pumpelly	Lamborghini 5.2 L V10	C	161	+8 Laps
19	GTD	22	(United States) Alex Job Racing	(United States) Cooper MacNeil (United States) Leh Keen	Porsche 911 GT3 R	C	161	+8 Laps
19	GTD	22	(United States) Alex Job Racing	(United States) Cooper MacNeil (United States) Leh Keen	Porsche 4.0 L Flat-6	C	161	+8 Laps
20	GTD	73	(United States) Park Place Motorsports	(Germany) Jörg Bergmeister (United States) Patrick Lindsey	Porsche 911 GT3 R	C	160	+9 Laps
20	GTD	73	(United States) Park Place Motorsports	(Germany) Jörg Bergmeister (United States) Patrick Lindsey	Porsche 4.0 L Flat-6	C	160	+9 Laps
21	GTD	63	(United States) Scuderia Corsa	(Denmark) Christina Nielsen (Italy) Alessandro Balzan	Ferrari 488 GT3	C	160	+9 Laps
21	GTD	63	(United States) Scuderia Corsa	(Denmark) Christina Nielsen (Italy) Alessandro Balzan	Ferrari F154CB 3.9 L Turbo V8	C	160	+9 Laps
22	GTD	540	(United States) Black Swan Racing	(United States) Tim Pappas (United States) Andy Pilgrim	Porsche 911 GT3 R	C	160	+9 Laps
22	GTD	540	(United States) Black Swan Racing	(United States) Tim Pappas (United States) Andy Pilgrim	Porsche 4.0 L Flat-6	C	160	+9 Laps
23	GTLM	911	(United States) Porsche North America	(France) Patrick Pilet (United Kingdom) Nick Tandy	Porsche 911 RSR	M	159	+10 Laps
23	GTLM	911	(United States) Porsche North America	(France) Patrick Pilet (United Kingdom) Nick Tandy	Porsche 4.0 L Flat-6	M	159	+10 Laps
24	GTD	27	(United States) Dream Racing	(Monaco) Cédric Sbirrazzuoli (United States) Lawrence DeGeorge	Lamborghini Huracán GT3	C	158	+11 Laps
24	GTD	27	(United States) Dream Racing	(Monaco) Cédric Sbirrazzuoli (United States) Lawrence DeGeorge	Lamborghini 5.2 L V10	C	158	+11 Laps
25 DNF	GTD	23	(United States) Team Seattle/Alex Job Racing	(Germany) Mario Farnbacher (Spain) Alex Riberas	Porsche 911 GT3 R	C	142	Tie rod
25 DNF	GTD	23	(United States) Team Seattle/Alex Job Racing	(Germany) Mario Farnbacher (Spain) Alex Riberas	Porsche 4.0 L Flat-6	C	142	Tie rod
26 DNF	PC	85	(United States) JDC-Miller MotorSports	(Canada) Misha Goikhberg (South Africa) Stephen Simpson	Oreca FLM09	C	108	Did Not Finish
26 DNF	PC	85	(United States) JDC-Miller MotorSports	(Canada) Misha Goikhberg (South Africa) Stephen Simpson	Chevrolet 6.2 L V8	C	108	Did Not Finish
27 DNF	PC	7	(United States) Starworks Motorsport	(Mexico) José Gutiérrez (United States) Sean Rayhall	Oreca FLM09	C	100	Clutch
27 DNF	PC	7	(United States) Starworks Motorsport	(Mexico) José Gutiérrez (United States) Sean Rayhall	Chevrolet 6.2 L V8	C	100	Clutch
28 DNF	GTLM	25	(United States) BMW Team RLL	(United States) Bill Auberlen (Germany) Dirk Werner	BMW M6 GTLM	M	89	Crash
28 DNF	GTLM	25	(United States) BMW Team RLL	(United States) Bill Auberlen (Germany) Dirk Werner	BMW 4.4 L Turbo V8	M	89	Crash
29 DNF	GTLM	912	(United States) Porsche North America	(New Zealand) Earl Bamber (France) Frédéric Makowiecki	Porsche 911 RSR	M	89	Crash
29 DNF	GTLM	912	(United States) Porsche North America	(New Zealand) Earl Bamber (France) Frédéric Makowiecki	Porsche 4.0 L Flat-6	M	89	Crash
30 DNF	PC	54	(United States) CORE Autosport	(United States) Jon Bennett (United States) Colin Braun	Oreca FLM09	C	69	Suspension
30 DNF	PC	54	(United States) CORE Autosport	(United States) Jon Bennett (United States) Colin Braun	Chevrolet 6.2 L V8	C	69	Suspension
31 DNF	GTLM	100	(United States) BMW Team RLL	(United States) John Edwards (Germany) Lucas Luhr	BMW M6 GTLM	M	4	Crash
31 DNF	GTLM	100	(United States) BMW Team RLL	(United States) John Edwards (Germany) Lucas Luhr	BMW 4.4 L Turbo V8	M	4	Crash

Tyre manufacturers
Key
Symbol	Tyre manufacturer
**C**	Continental
**M**	Michelin

== Championship standings after the race ==
Prototype Drivers' Championship standings
Pos.	+/–	Driver	Points
1		(Portugal) João Barbosa (Brazil) Christian Fittipaldi	220
2		(United States) Eric Curran (United States) Dane Cameron	216
3		(United States) Jordan Taylor (United States) Ricky Taylor	211
4		(Belgium) Marc Goossens	197
5		(Brazil) Oswaldo Negri Jr.	191

PC Drivers' Championship standings
Pos.	+/–	Driver	Points
1		(Venezuela) Alex Popow (Netherlands) Renger van der Zande	267
2		(United States) Robert Alon (United Kingdom) Tom Kimber-Smith	250
3		(South Africa) Stephen Simpson (Canada) Misha Goikhberg	235
4		(United States) Jon Bennett (United States) Colin Braun	212
5		(United States) James French (Canada) Kyle Marcelli	210

GTLM Drivers' Championship standings
Pos.	+/–	Driver	Points
1		(United Kingdom) Oliver Gavin (United States) Tommy Milner	228
2		(Australia) Ryan Briscoe (United Kingdom) Richard Westbrook	218
3	2	(Spain) Antonio García (Denmark) Jan Magnussen	197
4	1	(United States) Bill Auberlen (Germany) Dirk Werner	195
5	1	(Italy) Giancarlo Fisichella (Finland) Toni Vilander	193

GTD Drivers' Championship standings
Pos.	+/–	Driver	Points
1		(Italy) Alessandro Balzan (Denmark) Christina Nielsen	212
2	1	(United States) Andy Lally (United States) John Potter	199
3	1	(Germany) Mario Farnbacher (Spain) Alex Riberas	187
4		(Netherlands) Jeroen Bleekemolen (United States) Ben Keating	186
5		(United States) Andrew Davis (United Kingdom) Robin Liddell	185

- Note: Only the top five positions are included for all sets of standings.

Prototype Teams' Championship standings
Pos.	+/–	Team	Points
1		(United States) No. 5 Action Express Racing	220
2		(United States) No. 31 Action Express Racing	216
3		(United States) No. 10 Wayne Taylor Racing	211
4		(United States) No. 90 VisitFlorida Racing	197
5		(United States) No. 60 Michael Shank Racing with Curb-Agajanian	191

PC Teams' Championship standings
Pos.	+/–	Team	Points
1		(United States) No. 8 Starworks Motorsport	267
2		(United States) No. 52 PR1/Mathiasen Motorsports	250
3		(United States) No. 54 CORE Autosport	235
4		(United States) No. 85 JDC-Miller MotorSports	235
5		(United States) No. 38 Performance Tech Motorsports	235

GTLM Teams' Championship standings
Pos.	+/–	Team	Points
1		(United States) No. 4 Corvette Racing	192
2		(United States) No. 67 Ford Chip Ganassi Racing	187
3	2	(United States) No. 3 Corvette Racing	170
4	1	(United States) No. 25 BMW Team RLL	166
5	1	(United States) No. 62 Risi Competizione	164

GTD Teams' Championship standings
Pos.	+/–	Team	Points
1		(United States) No. 63 Scuderia Corsa	212
2	1	(United States) No. 44 Magnus Racing	199
3	1	(United States) No. 23 Team Seattle/Alex Job Racing	187
4		(United States) No. 33 Riley Motorsports	186
5		(United States) No. 6 Stevenson Motorsports	185

- Note: Only the top five positions are included for all sets of standings.

Prototype Manufacturers' Championship standings
Pos.	+/–	Manufacturer	Points
1		(United States) Chevrolet	236
2		(Japan) Honda	227
3		(Japan) Mazda	212
4		(Germany) BMW	56
5		(United States) Ford	30

GTLM Manufacturers' Championship standings
Pos.	+/–	Manufacturer	Points
1		(United States) Chevrolet	227
2		(United States) Ford	217
3		(Germany) Porsche	209
4	1	(Italy) Ferrari	204
5	1	(Germany) BMW	200

GTD Manufacturers' Championship standings
Pos.	+/–	Manufacturer	Points
1	1	(Germany) Audi	220
2	1	(Italy) Ferrari	210
3		(Germany) Porsche	209
4	1	(United States) Dodge	199
5	1	(Germany) BMW	197

- Note: Only the top five positions are included for all sets of standings.

IMSA SportsCar Championship
Previous race: SportsCar Grand Prix	2016 season	Next race: Continental Tire Road Race Showcase
