= Alex Popow =

Venezuelan racing driver

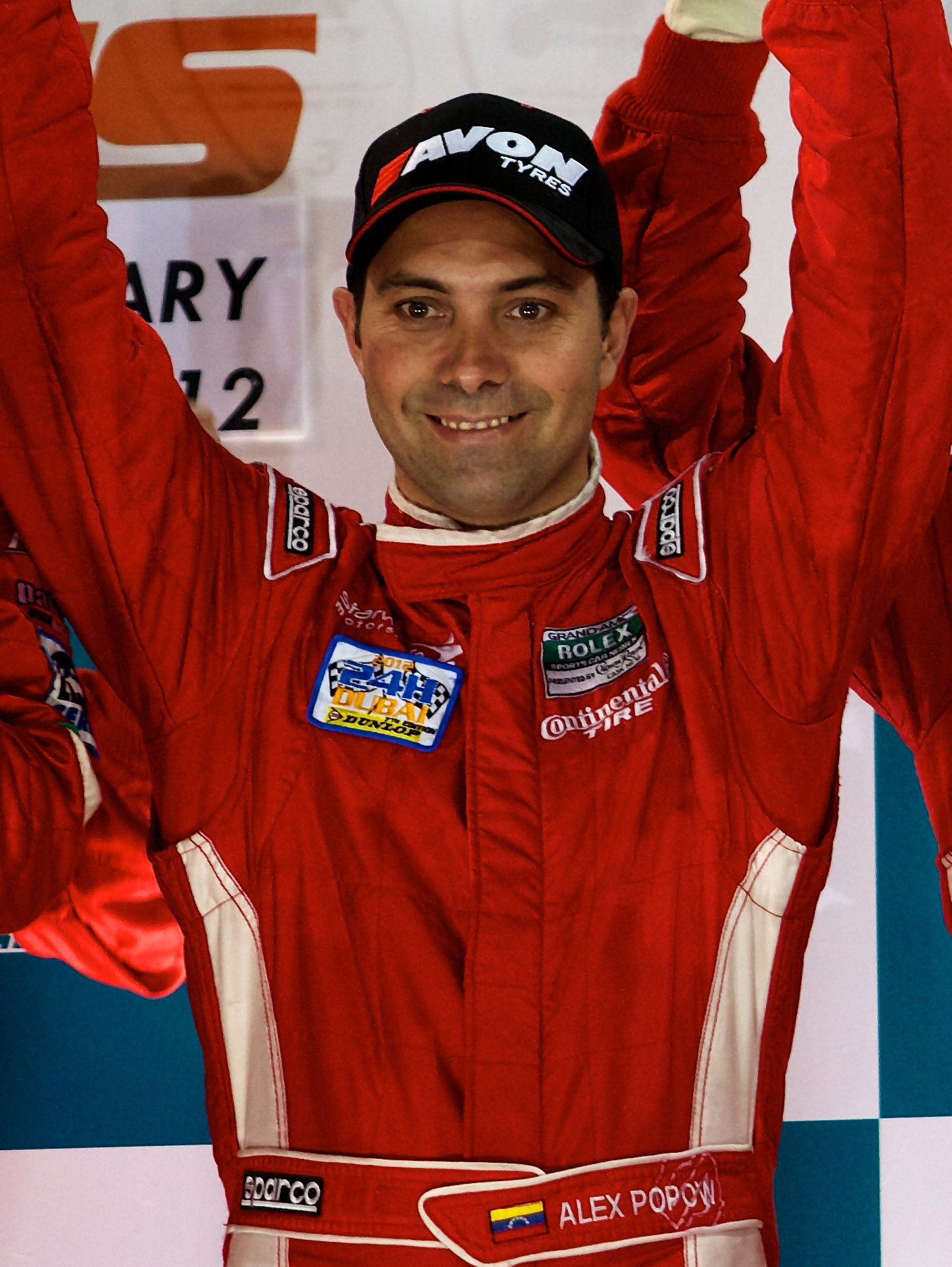
- Nationality: (Venezuela) Venezuelan
- Born: Alex Popow Karaha; November 9, 1975 (age 51) Lechería, Venezuela

American Le Mans Series Rolex Sports Car Series career
- Current team: CORE autosport Starworks Motorsport
- Categorisation: FIA Silver (until 2018); FIA Bronze (2019–)

Previous series
- Mexican Seat Leon Championship; Latin American Challenge Formula 2000 Championship; Supercup Seat Leon; Formula 2000 Venezuela; Latin America Formula 2000; Mustang Cup; Fiat Palio Cup

Championship titles
- 2016 2012 2005 2000, 2002 1998–1999: IMSA Sportscar Championship; American Le Mans Series; Formula 2000 Venezuela; Mustang Cup; Fiat Palio Cup

NASCAR O'Reilly Auto Parts Series career
- 1 race run over 1 year
- 2012 position: 96th
- Best finish: 96th (2012)
- First race: 2012 Zippo 200 (Watkins Glen)
Wins	Top tens	Poles
0	0	0
- Statistics up to date as of July 1, 2013.

Alex Popow Karaha (born 9 November 1975 in Lecheria) is a Venezuelan racing driver who last competed in the IMSA SportsCar Championship, having formerly competed in the American Le Mans Series and Rolex Sports Car Series for CORE autosport and Starworks Motorsport. Popow was champion of the LMPC class in the American Le Mans Series in 2012 and obtained a class victory at the 12 Hours of Sebring in 2012, and an overall win the inaugural Brickyard Grand Prix at Indianapolis Motor Speedway in 2012.

Popow finished second overall in the 2012 24 Hours of Daytona, and most recently won the 2016 IMSA SportsCar Championship title alongside Renger van der Zande in the Prototype Challenge (PC) class.

== Name ==
Popow's name, which is pronounced "pop-off", is the result of his Eastern European ancestry. During a broadcast on Speed Channel, it was revealed that his family name was originally Popov, but was changed to Popow upon his ancestors' immigration.

== Early racing career ==
Popow began his racing career in his native Venezuela in 1996, winning the Eastern Division Championship for 2000cc cars. He repeated as champion one year later before moving up to the Fiat Palio Cup and Mustang Cup, where he reached success in both championships. Popow was the Expert Class champion in the Palio Cup in both 1998 and 1999, while also earning top honors in the Mustang Cup in 2000 and 2002.

Having won the Formula 2000 Venezuela Championship in 2005, Popow went on to form the first all-Venezuelan team to participate in the Panam-GP series, which took place in six countries, including Venezuela.

== Bogota 6 Hours ==
Considered the most prestigious professional auto racing event in Colombia, Popow has also enjoyed success in the Bogota 6 Hours. He earned a second-place result in his debut in 1997, while also collecting runner-up finishes in 2004 and 2005. Popow was crowned champion of the race in 2011.

== Off-road racing ==
Between 2007 and 2009, Popow competed in the AWA 4x4 Rally Championship, earning a third-place finish in the LUV D-MAX Trophy.

== Rolex Sports Car Series ==
Popow made his Grand-Am debut in 2011, racing in the Rolex Sports Car Series for Starworks Motorsport team. He finished a season-high third at Watkins Glen with Ryan Dalziel and finished 20th in the Daytona Prototype points standings.

In 2012, Popow took his first victory in the inaugural Brickyard Grand Prix Indianapolis Motor Speedway, and obtained two second places and two fourth, so that finished sixth in the drivers' championship.

Popow with Ryan Dalziel achieved one win, two second places and two third in the 2013 Rolex Sports Car Series season, however the poor results obtained at the end of the season, did they finished eighth in the drivers' championship in the DP class. In 2013, Popow won the ‘Jim Trueman’ Award by a landslide and the Starworks Motosport was crowned ‘Sports Car Team of the Year’ by the SPEED Channel.

== American Le Mans Series ==
Popow won the 2012 12 Hours of Sebring in his American Le Mans Series debut, teaming with Burt Frisselle and E. J. Viso in a CORE autosport Oreca FLM09 Prototype Challenge car. He then went on to win the following ALMS round at Long Beach with Ryan Dalziel.

== Other racing ==
Popow competed in the Latin America Challenge Formula 2000 Championship, finishing third in 2010 and fourth in 2011. He also took part in the Mexican Supercup Seat Leon Championship in 2011, finishing second.

Additionally, Popow finished third in the 2012 Gulf 12 Hours at Abu Dhabi.

In August 2012, Popow made his NASCAR debut, driving in the Nationwide Series for TriStar Motorsports at Watkins Glen International.

== Personal life ==
Popow is married to Lu-Ann Acosta-Rubio and has two children, including his namesake Alex, a junior formula racecar driver. He enjoys extreme sports in his free time.

== Motorsports career results ==
=== NASCAR ===
(key) (Bold - Pole position awarded by time. Italics - Pole position earned by points standings. * – Most laps led.)

==== Nationwide Series ====
NASCAR Nationwide Series results
Year	Team	No.	Make	1	2	3	4	5	6	7	8	9	10	11	12	13	14	15	16	17	18	19	20	21	22	23	24	25	26	27	28	29	30	31	32	33	NNSC	Pts	Ref
2012	TriStar Motorsports	19	Toyota	DAY	PHO	LVS	BRI	CAL	TEX	RCH	TAL	DAR	IOW	CLT	DOV	MCH	ROA	KEN	DAY	NHA	CHI	IND	IOW	GLN; 38	CGV	BRI	ATL	RCH	CHI	KEN	DOV	CLT	KAN	TEX	PHO	HOM	96th	6	

^{*} Season still in progress
^{1} not eligible for series points

=== Complete WeatherTech SportsCar Championship results ===
Year	Entrant	Class	Chassis	Engine	1	2	3	4	5	6	7	8	9	10	11	Rank	Points
2014	Starworks Motorsport	P	Riley Mk XXVI DP	Dinan (BMW) 5.0 L V8	DAY; 17											44th	30
2014	Starworks Motorsport	P	Riley Mk XXVI DP	Honda HR35TT 3.5 L V6 Turbo		SEB; 17	LBH	LGA	DET	WGL	MOS	IMS	ELK	COA	PET	44th	30
2015	Starworks Motorsport	PC	Oreca FLM09	Chevrolet LS3 6.2 L V8	DAY; 6	SEB; 5	LGA	DET	WGL; 1	MOS	LIM	ELK	COA; DNS	PET; 7		12th	115
2016	Starworks Motorsport	PC	Oreca FLM09	Chevrolet LS3 6.2 L V8	DAY; 4	SEB; 3	LBH; 2	LGA; 2	DET; 1	**WGL**; 1	MOS; 2	LIM; 1	ELK; 6	COA; 1	PET; 6	1st	355
2018	BAR1 Motorsports	P	Riley Mk. 30	Gibson GK428 4.2 L V8	DAY; 14	SEB	LBH	MDO	DET	WGL	MOS	ELK	LGA	PET		59th	17
