= 2016 BUBBA Burger Sports Car Grand Prix =

Third round of the 2016 IMSA SportsCar Championship season

The layout of the Long Beach Street Circuit

The 2016 BUBBA Burger Sports Car Grand Prix was a sports car race sanctioned by the International Motor Sports Association (IMSA) held on the Long Beach Street Circuit in California, United States, on April 16, 2016, as part of the Long Beach Grand Prix event weekend. The race was the third of twelve scheduled rounds of the 2016 IMSA SportsCar Championship, and was held for the Prototype, Prototype Challenge (PC) and Grand Touring Le Mans (GTLM) categories. The race was the shortest of the 2016 IMSA Championship calendar.

The No. 5 Corvette Daytona Prototype of Christian Fittipaldi and João Barbosa qualified in pole position and initially held their advantage until Fittipaldi was overtaken by Ricky Taylor in the No. 10 Wayne Taylor Racing car and Tom Long on the race's first lap. The car kept the lead through the following sequence of pit stops and Jordan Taylor drove the WTR Corvette DP across the start/finish line at the end of the race to claim his and Ricky Taylor's fifth SportsCar Championship victory. Action Express Racing's No. 5 car of Fittipaldi and Barbosa finished second and the No. 31 Corvette DP of Dane Cameron and Eric Curran came in third.

The Prototype Challenge (PC) category was won by JDC-Miller MotorSports' Oreca FLM09 car of Misha Goikhberg and Stephen Simpson. Alex Popow and Renger van der Zande finished second, while James French and Kyle Marcelli were classified third after Marcelli crashed on the final lap. Frédéric Makowiecki collided with Tommy Milner with around 2 minutes remaining, allowing Nick Tandy and Patrick Pilet to take victory in GTLM while Tommy Milner and Oliver Gavin finished second. The Risi Competizione Ferrari 488 GTE of Toni Vilander and Giancarlo Fisichella completed the class podium in third place.

The result meant Barbosa and Fittipaldi took over the lead of the Prototype Drivers' Championship with 93 points. Cameron and Curran moved from fourth to second, 1 point ahead of race winners Jordan Taylor and Ricky Taylor. Honda continued to lead the Prototype Manufactures' Championship, but their advantage was reduced to 1 point over Chevrolet. Simpson and Goikhberg's victory allowed them to take over the lead of the Prototype Challenge Drivers' Championship with 101 points. Popow and van der Zande moved from third to second while the absent José Gutiérrez dropped to fifth. The result of the race meant Gavin and Milner extended their advantage to eighteen points as Bill Auberlen and Dirk Werner took over second in the GTLM Drivers' Championship. Chevrolet moved further ahead of Porsche in the GTLM Manufactures' Championship with nine races left in the season.

== Background ==
=== Preview ===
International Motor Sports Association (IMSA) president Scott Atherton confirmed the race was part of the schedule for the 2016 IMSA SportsCar Championship (IMSA SCC) in August 2015. It was the third consecutive year the event was held as part of the WeatherTech SportsCar Championship, and the ninth annual running of the race, counting the period between 2006 and 2013 when it was a round of the Rolex Sports Car Series and the American Le Mans Series respectively. The 2016 BUBBA Burger Sports Car Grand Prix was the third of twelve scheduled sports car races of 2016 by IMSA, the shortest of the season in terms of distance, and it was the first round not held as part of the North American Endurance Cup. The race was held at the eleven-turn 1.968 mi (3.167 km) Long Beach street circuit in Long Beach, California on April 16, 2016. The PC category would participate in the event for the first time since the 2013 running.

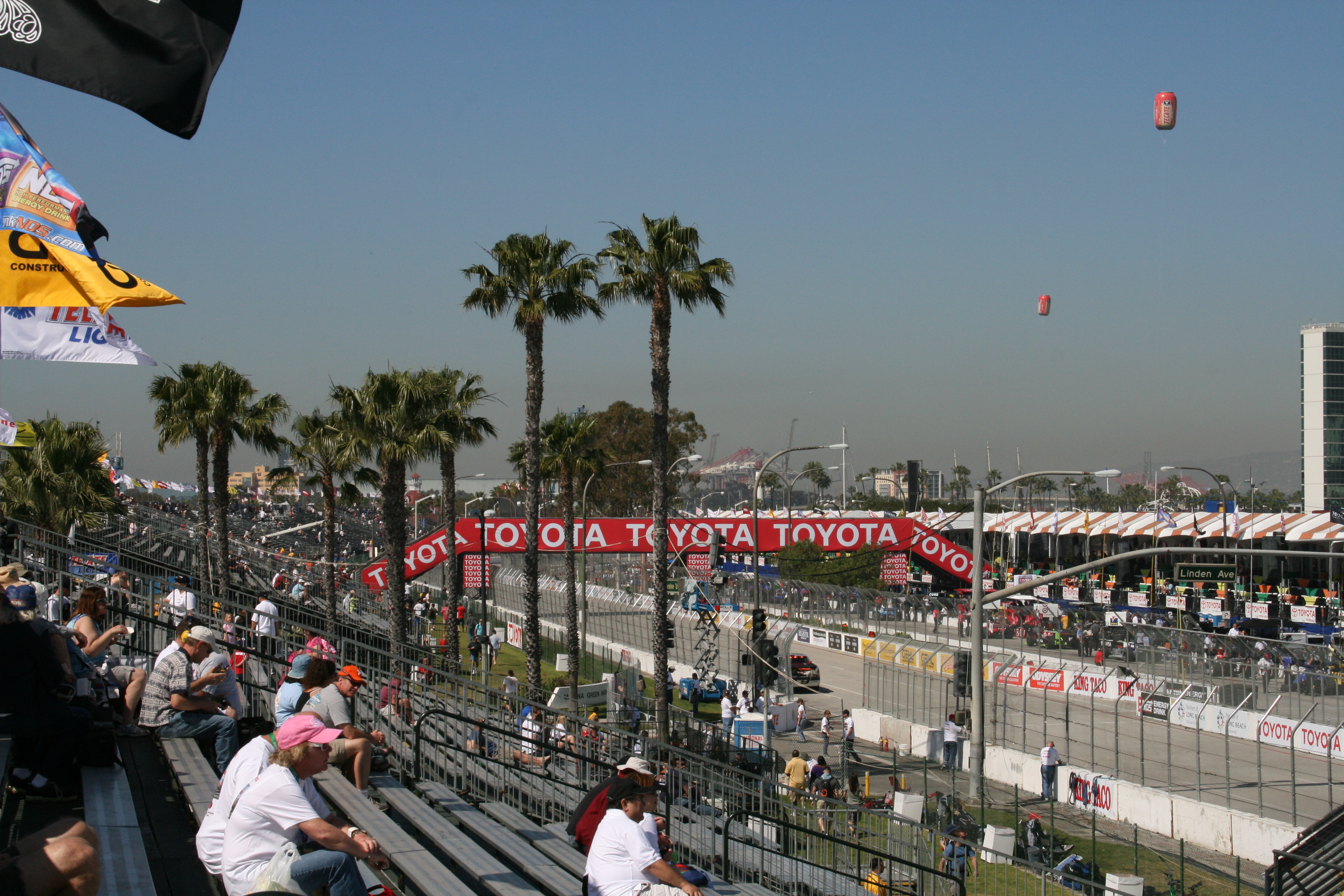
The Long Beach Street Circuit (pictured in 2009), where the race was held.

Before the race, Ed Brown, Pipo Derani, Johannes van Overbeek, and Scott Sharp led the Prototype Drivers' Championship with 72 points, ahead of Scott Pruett with 62 points, and Filipe Albuquerque, João Barbosa, and Christian Fittipaldi in third with 60 points. With 66 points, PC was led by Robert Alon, Jose Gutiérrez, and Tom Kimber-Smith with a one-point advantage over Misha Goikhberg, Kenton Koch, Chris Miller, and Stephen Simpson. In GTLM, the Drivers' Championship was led by Marcel Fässler, Oliver Gavin and Tommy Milner with 72 points; the trio held a ten-point gap over Earl Bamber, Michael Christensen and Frédéric Makowiecki. Honda and Chevrolet were leading their respective Manufacturers' Championships, while Tequila Patrón ESM, PR1/ Mathiasen Motorsports and Corvette Racing each led their own Teams' Championships.

IMSA altered the balance of performance to try to create parity within the Prototype and GTLM categories. The Ligier JS P2 received a reduction in turbo boost pressure while the Lola B12/80 received an increase in turbo boost pressure. The DeltaWing had its weight decreased by 10 kg (22 lb). The BMW M6 GTLM received a reduction in turbo boost pressure and a change in its refuelling hose restrictor. The Chevrolet Corvette C7.R and Ferrari 488 GTE also received a change in their refuelling hose restrictor.

=== Entry list ===
Twenty-five cars were officially entered for the Tequila Patrón Sports Car Showcase, with most of the entries in the Prototype and Grand Touring Le Mans (GTLM) categories. Since the majority of the remaining rounds of the 2016 IMSA SportsCar Championship were sprint races, teams entered their regular driver pairings for the first time this season. The 2015 race winners, Wayne Taylor Racing (WTR), returned to defend their title. Action Express Racing (AER) fielded two Chevrolet Corvette DP cars while VisitFlorida Racing (VFR) and WTR fielded one. Mazda Motorsports had two Lola B12/80 cars and Michael Shank Racing (MSR) entered one Ligier JS P2. Panoz brought the DeltaWing car to Long Beach for the second successive year. Tequila Patrón ESM did not participate as the team solely focused on the 2016 North American Endurance Cup. Alegra Motorsports, DragonSpeed, and Highway to Help skipped the event. The Prototype Challenge (PC) class was composed of seven Oreca FLM09 cars: two from Starworks Motorsports. BAR1 Motorsports, CORE Autosport, JDC-Miller MotorSports, Performance Tech and PR1/Mathiasen Motorsports entered one car each. GTLM was represented by ten entries from five different brands. With the absence of the Grand Touring Daytona (GTD) class from the field, only three racing classes were represented in Long Beach.

== Practice and qualifying ==
There were two practice sessions preceding the start of the race on Saturday, one on Friday morning and one on Friday afternoon. The first session lasted two hours on Friday morning while the second session on Friday afternoon lasted 25 minutes.

In the first practice session, Jonathan Bomarito set the fastest time in the No. 55 Mazda with a time of 1 minute, 15.917 seconds, 0.039 seconds faster than Jordan Taylor's No. 10 Corvette DP. Ryan Hunter-Reay was third fastest in the No. 90 Corvette DP, Joel Miller's No. 70 Mazda placed fourth, and Dane Cameron's No. 31 AER car rounded out the top five. The fastest PC class car was Colin Braun in the No. 54 CORE Autosport car with 1 minute, 17.185 seconds, followed by Renger van der Zande in the No. 8 Starworks entry. The GTLM class was topped by the No. 4 Chevrolet Corvette C7.R of Oliver Gavin. Lucas Luhr in the No. 100 BMW was second and Jan Magnussen's No. 3 Corvette was third. The session ended prematurely when Richard Westbrook's No. 67 Ford GT caught fire in the closing minutes.

In the final practice session, Ricky Taylor's No. 10 car set the fastest time with a lap of 1 minute, 15.474 seconds. Braun was fastest again in PC and GTLM was topped by Earl Bamber's No. 912 Porsche.

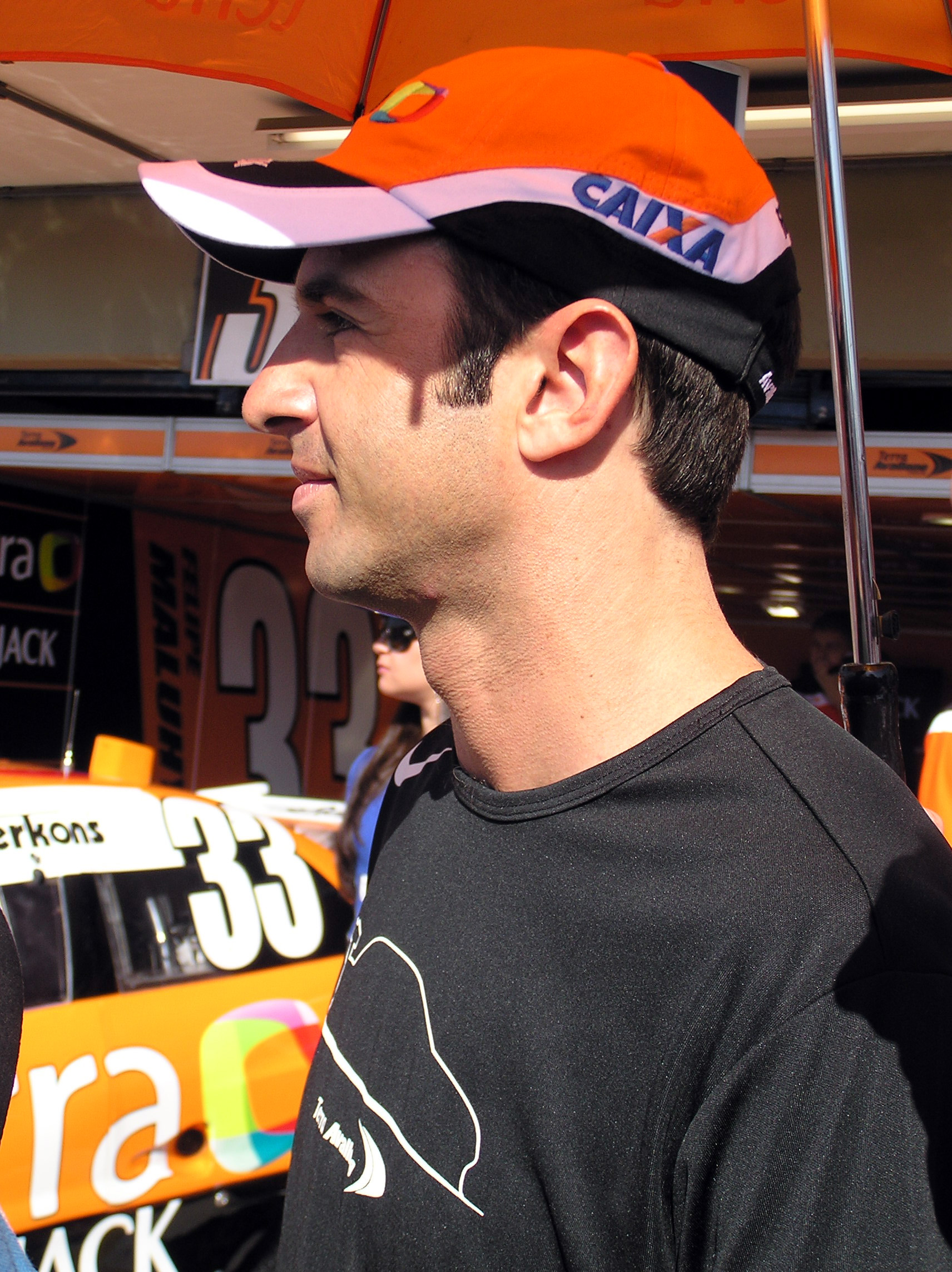
Christian Fittipaldi (pictured in 2006) helped clinch the No. 5 Corvette Daytona Prototype's first pole position of 2016.

Friday afternoon's 55-minute three-group qualifying session gave 15-minute sessions to all categories. Cars in GTLM were sent out first before those grouped in PC and Prototype had two separate identically timed sessions. Regulations stipulated teams to nominate one qualifying driver, with the fastest laps determining each classes starting order. IMSA arranged the grid to put Prototypes ahead of all PC and GTLM cars.

Christian Fittipaldi in the No. 5 AER Corvette DP took his first pole position of the season, and the 3rd of his career with a lap of 1 minutes, 14.962 seconds that he set on his fifth try. He was joined on the grid's front row by Ricky Taylor whose best lap in the No. 10 Wayne Taylor Racing car was 0.171 seconds slower. Tom Long's No. 70 Mazda took third followed by Eric Curran's No. 31 Corvette DP in fourth. Trisan Nunez's No. 55 Mazda started from fifth place. Andy Meyrick qualified the DeltaWing in sixth position. Marc Goossens spun the No. 90 Corvette DP at turn eleven and stalled; resulting in a red flag.

French set the fastest time in PC for Performance Tech Motorsports followed by Bennett in the No. 54 CORE Autosport car. Kvamme crashed at turn one. The red flag was thrown and caused the session to be abandoned. Misha Goikhberg was handed pole position as the session did not reach minimum time to be declared official and Starting positions were set by Teams' Championship standings.

In GTLM, Bill Auberlen took his second consecutive pole of the season with a lap of 1 minutes, 17.272 seconds. Porsche took second and third positions, led by its No. 912 car driven by Bamber (whose time was 0.183 seconds faster than Nick Tandy's third-placed No. 911 entry). The two Corvettes were fourth and fifth (the No. 4 car driven by Gavin in front of the No. 3 vehicle of Magnussen). Lucas Luhr qualified the No. 100 BMW M6 in sixth followed by Hand's No. 66 Ford GT in seventh, and the highest-placed Ferrari was Fisichella's No. 62 488 GTE. The No. 67 CGR Ford entry did not participate in qualifying as the team were continuing repairs.

=== Qualifying results ===
Pole positions in each class are indicated in bold and by ‡.

Pos.	Class	No.	Team	Driver	Time	Gap	Grid
1	**P**	**5**	**(United States) Action Express Racing**	**(Brazil) Christian Fittipaldi**	**1:14.962**	—	1‡
2	P	10	(United States) Wayne Taylor Racing	(United States) Ricky Taylor	1:15.133	+0.171	2
3	P	70	(Japan) Mazda Motorsports	(United States) Tom Long	1:15.641	+0.679	3
4	P	31	(United States) Action Express Racing	(United States) Eric Curran	1:15.741	+0.779	4
5	P	55	(Japan) Mazda Motorsports	(United States) Tristan Nunez	1:15.792	+0.830	5
6	P	0	(United States) Panoz DeltaWing Racing	(United Kingdom) Andy Meyrick	1:16.006	+1.044	6
7	P	90	(United States) VisitFlorida Racing	(Belgium) Marc Goossens	1:16.163	+1.201	7
8	**GTLM**	**25**	**(United States) BMW Team RLL**	**(United States) Bill Auberlen**	**1:17.272**	**+2.310**	16‡
9	GTLM	912	(United States) Porsche North America	(New Zealand) Earl Bamber	1:17.275	+2.313	17
10	GTLM	911	(United States) Porsche North America	(France) Patrick Pilet	1:17.458	+2.496	18
11	P	60	(United States) Michael Shank Racing with Curb-Agajanian	(United States) John Pew	1:17.513	+2.551	8
12	GTLM	4	(United States) Corvette Racing	(United Kingdom) Oliver Gavin	1:17.573	+2.611	19
13	GTLM	3	(United States) Corvette Racing	(Denmark) Jan Magnussen	1:17.676	+2.714	20
14	PC	38	(United States) Performance Tech Motorsports	(United States) James French	1:17.910	+2.948	13
15	GTLM	100	(United States) BMW Team RLL	(Germany) Lucas Luhr	1:18.105	+3.143	21
16	GTLM	66	(United States) Ford Chip Ganassi Racing	(United States) Joey Hand	1:18.120	+3.158	22
17	GTLM	62	(United States) Risi Competizione	(Italy) Giancarlo Fisichella	1:18.282	+3.320	23
18	GTLM	68	(United States) Scuderia Corsa	(Italy) Alessandro Balzan	1:18.290	+3.328	25
19	PC	54	(United States) CORE Autosport	(United States) Jon Bennett	1:18.623	+3.661	12
20	PC	52	(United States) PR1/Mathiasen Motorsports	(United States) Robert Alon	1:19.012	+4.050	14
21	**PC**	**85**	**(United States) JDC-Miller MotorSports**	**(Canada) Misha Goikhberg**	**1:19.154**	**+4.192**	9‡
22	PC	8	(United States) Starworks Motorsport	(Venezuela) Alex Popow	1:20.281	+5.319	10
23	PC	20	(United States) BAR1 Motorsports	(United States) Tomy Drissi	1:21.633	+6.671	11
24	PC	88	(United States) Starworks Motorsport	(United States) Mark Kvamme	1:26.327	+11.365	15
25	GTLM	67	(United States) Ford Chip Ganassi Racing	Did Not Participate			24

== Race ==
=== Post-race ===
Ricky Taylor was delighted with the victory, saying: "The guys give us an awesome car. It was a Corvette DP 1-2-3, which is very special. We couldn’t be happier. Jordan did and awesome job. Everybody was fantastic." Jordan Taylor said of the result : "I was able to pull a little bit of a gap thanks to the 31 and kind of maintain that until the end of the race. Thankfully, we didn’t catch too much traffic in the last 10 to 15 laps and we were basically able to hold our pace and get to the end." Fittipaldi stated : "We managed to get by the Mazda going into the hairpin. The No. 10 was about FOUR seconds ahead or something like that and we managed to close it down a little bit. It was a pretty solid race."

Makowiecki accepted responsibility for causing the late-race collision with Milner which cost the No. 912 Porsche victory in GTLM: " The collision in the penultimate lap was my fault. I was a touch too optimistic heading into the corner."

With a total of 93 points, Barbosa and Fittipaldi's second-place finish allowed them to take the lead of the Prototype Drivers' Championship. Jordan Taylor and Ricky Taylor advanced from sixth to third. As a result of winning the race, Goikhberg and Simpson took the lead of the Prototype Challenge Drivers' Championship with 101 points. Alon and Kimber-Smith dropped from first to third while Popow and van der Zande advanced from third to second. The final results of GTLM meant Milner and Gavin increased their gap to eighteen points as Auberlen and Werner took over the second position. Honda and Chevrolet continued to top their respective Manufacturers' Championships, while Corvette Racing continued to top the GTLM Teams' Championship. Action Express Racing and JDC-Miller Motorsports became the leaders of their respective class Teams' Championships with nine rounds left in the season.

=== Race results ===
Class winners are denoted in bold and ‡. P stands for Prototype, PC (Prototype Challenge), and GTLM (Grand Touring Le Mans).

Final race classification
Pos	Class	No.	Team	Drivers	Chassis	Tire	Laps	Time/Retired
Pos	Class	No.	Team	Drivers	Engine	Tire	Laps	Time/Retired
1	**P**	**10**	**(United States) Wayne Taylor Racing**	**(United States) Jordan Taylor (United States) Ricky Taylor**	**Corvette Daytona Prototype**	C	**75**	**01:40:58.937‡**
1	**P**	**10**	**(United States) Wayne Taylor Racing**	**(United States) Jordan Taylor (United States) Ricky Taylor**	**Chevrolet 5.5 L V8**	C	**75**	**01:40:58.937‡**
2	P	5	(United States) Action Express Racing	(Portugal) João Barbosa (Brazil) Christian Fittipaldi	Corvette Daytona Prototype	C	75	+2.958
2	P	5	(United States) Action Express Racing	(Portugal) João Barbosa (Brazil) Christian Fittipaldi	Chevrolet 5.5 L V8	C	75	+2.958
3	P	31	(United States) Action Express Racing	(United States) Eric Curran (United States) Dane Cameron	Corvette Daytona Prototype	C	75	+4.159
3	P	31	(United States) Action Express Racing	(United States) Eric Curran (United States) Dane Cameron	Chevrolet 5.5 L V8	C	75	+4.159
4	P	70	(Japan) Mazda Motorsports	(United States) Tom Long (United States) Joel Miller	Mazda Prototype	C	75	+7.618
4	P	70	(Japan) Mazda Motorsports	(United States) Tom Long (United States) Joel Miller	Mazda MZ-2.0T 2.0 L I4 Turbo	C	75	+7.618
5	P	55	(Japan) Mazda Motorsports	(United States) Jonathan Bomarito (United States) Tristan Nunez	Mazda Prototype	C	75	+10.606
5	P	55	(Japan) Mazda Motorsports	(United States) Jonathan Bomarito (United States) Tristan Nunez	Mazda MZ-2.0T 2.0 L I4 Turbo	C	75	+10.606
6	p	90	(United States) VisitFlorida Racing	(Belgium) Marc Goossens (United States) Ryan Hunter-Reay	Corvette Daytona Prototype	C	75	+31.943
6	p	90	(United States) VisitFlorida Racing	(Belgium) Marc Goossens (United States) Ryan Hunter-Reay	Chevrolet 5.5 L V8	C	75	+31.943
7	P	60	(United States) Michael Shank Racing with Curb-Agajanian	(United States) John Pew (Brazil) Oswaldo Negri Jr.	Ligier JS P2	C	75	+33.061
7	P	60	(United States) Michael Shank Racing with Curb-Agajanian	(United States) John Pew (Brazil) Oswaldo Negri Jr.	Honda HR35TT 3.5 Turbo V6	C	75	+33.061
8	**PC**	**85**	**(United States) JDC-Miller MotorSports**	**(Canada) Misha Goikhberg (South Africa) Stephen Simpson**	**Oreca FLM09**	C	**74**	**+1 Lap‡**
8	**PC**	**85**	**(United States) JDC-Miller MotorSports**	**(Canada) Misha Goikhberg (South Africa) Stephen Simpson**	**Chevrolet 6.2 L V8**	C	**74**	**+1 Lap‡**
9	PC	8	(United States) Starworks Motorsport	(Venezuela) Alex Popow (Netherlands) Renger van der Zande	Oreca FLM09	C	74	+1 Lap
9	PC	8	(United States) Starworks Motorsport	(Venezuela) Alex Popow (Netherlands) Renger van der Zande	Chevrolet 6.2 L V8	C	74	+1 Lap
10 DNF	PC	38	(United States) Performance Tech Motorsports	(United States) James French (Canada) Kyle Marcelli	Oreca FLM09	C	73	Crash
10 DNF	PC	38	(United States) Performance Tech Motorsports	(United States) James French (Canada) Kyle Marcelli	Chevrolet 6.2 L V8	C	73	Crash
11	**GTLM**	**911**	**(United States) Porsche North America**	**(France) Patrick Pilet (United Kingdom) Nick Tandy**	**Porsche 911 RSR**	M	**73**	**+2 Laps‡**
11	**GTLM**	**911**	**(United States) Porsche North America**	**(France) Patrick Pilet (United Kingdom) Nick Tandy**	**Porsche 4.0 L Flat-6**	M	**73**	**+2 Laps‡**
12	PC	20	(United States) BAR1 Motorsports	(United States) Tomy Drissi (United Kingdom) Johnny Mowlem	Oreca FLM09	C	73	+2 Laps
12	PC	20	(United States) BAR1 Motorsports	(United States) Tomy Drissi (United Kingdom) Johnny Mowlem	Chevrolet 6.2 L V8	C	73	+2 Laps
13	GTLM	4	(United States) Corvette Racing	(United Kingdom) Oliver Gavin (United States) Tommy Milner	Chevrolet Corvette C7.R	M	73	+2 Laps
13	GTLM	4	(United States) Corvette Racing	(United Kingdom) Oliver Gavin (United States) Tommy Milner	Chevrolet LT5.5 5.5 L V8	M	73	+2 Laps
14	GTLM	62	(United States) Risi Competizione	(Finland) Toni Vilander (Italy) Giancarlo Fisichella	Ferrari 488 GTE	M	72	+3 Laps
14	GTLM	62	(United States) Risi Competizione	(Finland) Toni Vilander (Italy) Giancarlo Fisichella	Ferrari F154CB 3.9 L Turbo V8	M	72	+3 Laps
15	GTLM	67	(United States) Ford Chip Ganassi Racing	(Australia) Ryan Briscoe (United Kingdom) Richard Westbrook	Ford GT	M	72	+3 Laps
15	GTLM	67	(United States) Ford Chip Ganassi Racing	(Australia) Ryan Briscoe (United Kingdom) Richard Westbrook	Ford EcoBoost 3.5 L Twin-turbo V6	M	72	+3 Laps
16	GTLM	25	(United States) BMW Team RLL	(United States) Bill Auberlen (Germany) Dirk Werner	BMW M6 GTLM	M	72	+3 Laps
16	GTLM	25	(United States) BMW Team RLL	(United States) Bill Auberlen (Germany) Dirk Werner	BMW 4.4 L Turbo V8	M	72	+3 Laps
17	GTLM	68	(United States) Scuderia Corsa	(Italy) Alessandro Balzan (Brazil) Daniel Serra	Ferrari 488 GTE	M	72	+3 Laps
17	GTLM	68	(United States) Scuderia Corsa	(Italy) Alessandro Balzan (Brazil) Daniel Serra	Ferrari F154CB 3.9 L Turbo V8	M	72	+3 Laps
18	PC	88	(United States) Starworks Motorsport	(United States) Mark Kvamme (United States) Ashley Freiberg	Oreca FLM09	C	71	+4 Laps
18	PC	88	(United States) Starworks Motorsport	(United States) Mark Kvamme (United States) Ashley Freiberg	Chevrolet 6.2 L V8	C	71	+4 Laps
19	PC	52	(United States) PR1/Mathiasen Motorsports	(United States) Robert Alon (United Kingdom) Tom Kimber-Smith	Oreca FLM09	C	71	+4 Laps
19	PC	52	(United States) PR1/Mathiasen Motorsports	(United States) Robert Alon (United Kingdom) Tom Kimber-Smith	Chevrolet 6.2 L V8	C	71	+4 Laps
20 DNF	GTLM	912	(United States) Porsche North America	(New Zealand) Earl Bamber (France) Frédéric Makowiecki	Porsche 911 RSR	M	70	Crash
20 DNF	GTLM	912	(United States) Porsche North America	(New Zealand) Earl Bamber (France) Frédéric Makowiecki	Porsche 4.0 L Flat-6	M	70	Crash
21	GTLM	66	(United States) Ford Chip Ganassi Racing	(Germany) Dirk Müller (United States) Joey Hand	Ford GT	M	70	+1 Lap
21	GTLM	66	(United States) Ford Chip Ganassi Racing	(Germany) Dirk Müller (United States) Joey Hand	Ford EcoBoost 3.5 L Twin-turbo V6	M	70	+1 Lap
22 DNF	GTLM	3	(United States) Corvette Racing	(Spain) Antonio García (Denmark) Jan Magnussen	Chevrolet Corvette C7.R	M	65	Crash
22 DNF	GTLM	3	(United States) Corvette Racing	(Spain) Antonio García (Denmark) Jan Magnussen	Chevrolet LT5.5 5.5 L V8	M	65	Crash
23 DNF	GTLM	100	(United States) BMW Team RLL	(United States) John Edwards (Germany) Lucas Luhr	BMW M6 GTLM	M	64	Crash
23 DNF	GTLM	100	(United States) BMW Team RLL	(United States) John Edwards (Germany) Lucas Luhr	BMW 4.4 L Turbo V8	M	64	Crash
24 DNF	P	0	(United States) Panoz DeltaWing Racing	(United Kingdom) Katherine Legge (United Kingdom) Andy Meyrick	DeltaWing DWC13	C	56	Engine
24 DNF	P	0	(United States) Panoz DeltaWing Racing	(United Kingdom) Katherine Legge (United Kingdom) Andy Meyrick	Élan (Mazda) 1.9 L I4 Turbo	C	56	Engine
25 DNF	PC	54	(United States) CORE Autosport	(United States) Jon Bennett (United States) Colin Braun	Oreca FLM09	C	35	Rear Suspension
25 DNF	PC	54	(United States) CORE Autosport	(United States) Jon Bennett (United States) Colin Braun	Chevrolet 6.2 L V8	C	35	Rear Suspension

Tyre manufacturers
Key
Symbol	Tyre manufacturer
**C**	Continental
**M**	Michelin

== Championship standings after the race ==
Prototype Drivers' Championship standings
Pos.	+/–	Driver	Points
1	2	(Portugal) João Barbosa (Brazil) Christian Fittipaldi	93
2	2	(United States) Eric Curran (United States) Dane Cameron	90
3	3	(United States) Jordan Taylor (United States) Ricky Taylor	89
4	1	(Belgium) Marc Goossens (United States) Ryan Hunter-Reay	84
5	3	(United States) Jonathan Bomarito (United States) Tristan Nunez	75

PC Drivers' Championship standings
Pos.	+/–	Driver	Points
1	1	(South Africa) Stephen Simpson (Canada) Misha Goikhberg	101
2	1	(Venezuela) Alex Popow (Netherlands) Renger van der Zande	93
3	2	(United States) Robert Alon (United Kingdom) Tom Kimber-Smith	92
4		(United Kingdom) Johnny Mowlem	86
5	4	(Mexico) José Gutiérrez	66

GTLM Drivers' Championship standings
Pos.	+/–	Driver	Points
1		(United Kingdom) Oliver Gavin (United States) Tommy Milner	105
2		(New Zealand) Earl Bamber (France) Frédéric Makowiecki	87
2	1	(United States) Bill Auberlen (Germany) Dirk Werner	87
3	2	(Italy) Giancarlo Fisichella (Finland) Toni Vilander	86
4	6	(France) Patrick Pilet (United Kingdom) Nick Tandy	82
5	1	(Brazil) Daniel Serra	80

GTD Drivers' Championship standings
Pos.	+/–	Driver	Points
1		(United States) Andy Lally (United States) John Potter (Germany) Marco Seefried	67
2		(Italy) Alessandro Balzan (Denmark) Christina Nielsen (United States) Jeff Segal	62
3		(Germany) Mario Farnbacher (Spain) Alex Riberas	53
4		(United States) Tim Pappas (Netherlands) Nicky Catsburg (Finland) Jesse Krohn (United States) Michael Marsal (Finland) Markus Palttala	52
5		(Canada) Paul Dalla Lana (Portugal) Pedro Lamy (Austria) Mathias Lauda (New Zealand) Richie Stanaway	51

- Note: Only the top five positions are included for all sets of standings.

Prototype Teams' Championship standings
Pos.	+/–	Team	Points
1	1	(United States) #5 Action Express Racing	92
2	1	(United States) #31 Action Express Racing	90
3	2	(United States) #10 Wayne Taylor Racing	89
4		(United States) #90 VisitFlorida Racing	88
5	1	(Japan) #55 Mazda Motorsports	77

PC Teams' Championship standings
Pos.	+/–	Team	Points
1	1	(United States) #85 JDC-Miller MotorSports	101
2	2	(United States) #8 Starworks Motorsport	93
3	2	(United States) #52 PR1/Mathiasen Motorsports	92
4	1	(United States) #20 BAR1 Motorsports	86
5	2	(United States) #54 CORE Autosport	85

GTLM Teams' Championship standings
Pos.	+/–	Team	Points
1		(United States) #4 Corvette Racing	105
2	1	(United States) #25 BMW Team RLL	87
3	1	(United States) #912 Porsche North America	87
4	1	(United States) #62 Risi Competizione	86
5	5	(United States) #911 Porsche North America	82

GTD Teams' Championship standings
Pos.	+/–	Team	Points
1		(United States) #44 Magnus Racing	67
2		(United States) #63 Scuderia Corsa	62
3		(United States) #23 Team Seattle/Alex Job Racing	53
4		(United States) #540 Black Swan Racing	52
5		(United States) #97 Turner Motorsport	52

- Note: Only the top five positions are included for all sets of standings.

Prototype Manufacturers' Championship standings
Pos.	+/–	Manufacturer	Points
1		(Japan) Honda	100
2		(United States) Chevrolet	99
3	1	(Japan) Mazda	88
4	1	(Germany) BMW	56
5		(United States) Ford	30

GTLM Manufacturers' Championship standings
Pos.	+/–	Manufacturer	Points
1		(United States) Chevrolet	102
2		(Germany) Porsche	97
3	1	(Italy) Ferrari	88
4	1	(Germany) BMW	86
5		(United States) Ford	80

GTD Manufacturers' Championship standings
Pos.	+/–	Manufacturer	Points
1		(Germany) Audi	65
2		(Italy) Ferrari	60
3		(Germany) Porsche	60
4		(Germany) BMW	58
5		(United States) Dodge	54

- Note: Only the top five positions are included for all sets of standings.

IMSA SportsCar Championship
Previous race: 12 Hours of Sebring	2016 season	Next race: Monterey Grand Prix
