= 2016 Continental Tire Road Race Showcase =

Ninth round of the 2016 IMSA SportsCar Championship season

Track map of Road America

The 2016 Continental Tire Road Race Showcase was a sports car race sanctioned by the International Motor Sports Association (IMSA). The Race was held at Road America in Elkhart Lake, Wisconsin on August 7, 2016. The race was the ninth round of the 2016 IMSA SportsCar Championship.

== Background ==
=== Preview ===
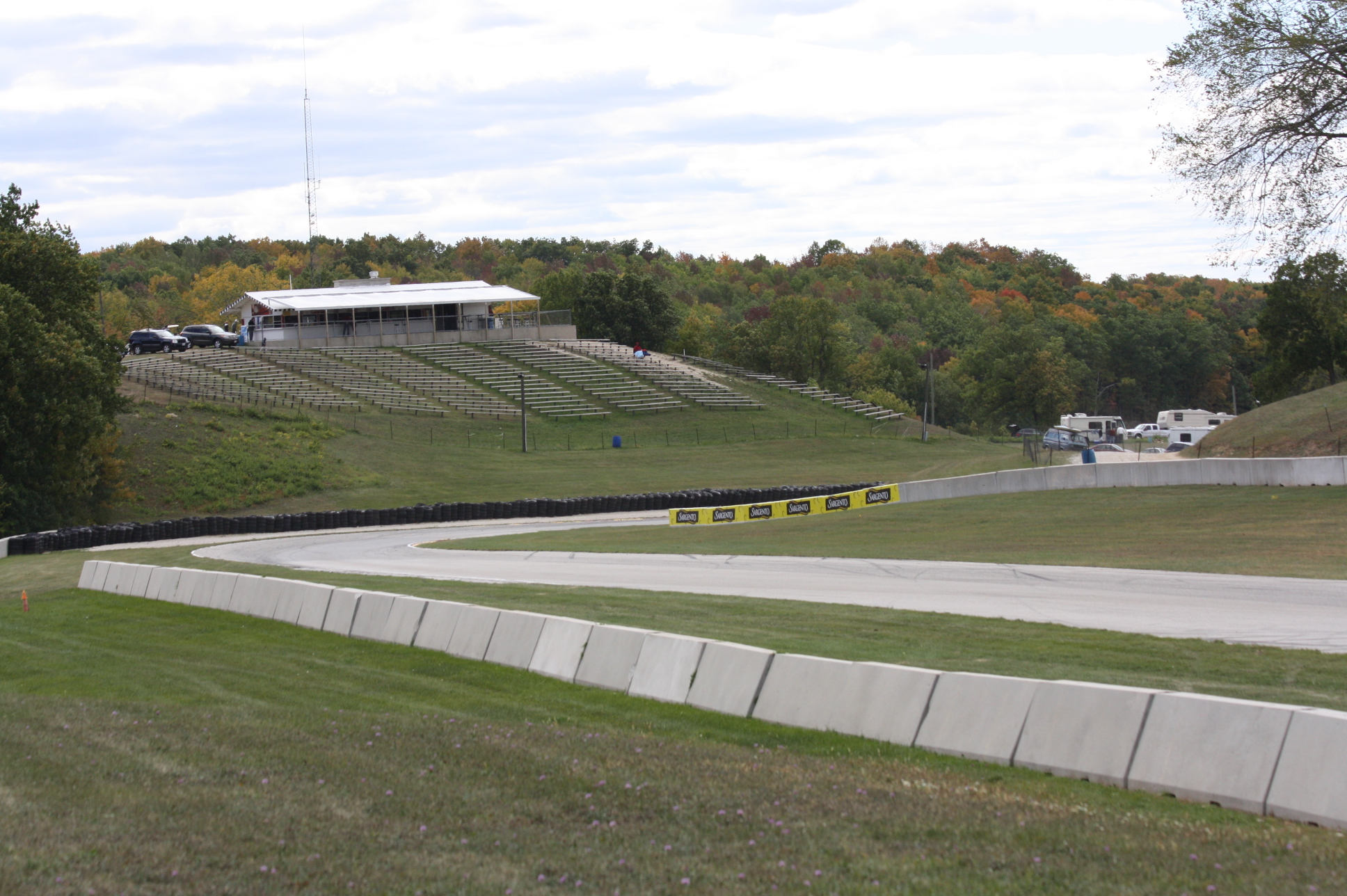
Road America, where the race was held.

International Motor Sports Association (IMSA) president Scott Atherton confirmed the race was part of the schedule for the 2016 IMSA SportsCar Championship (IMSA SCC) in August 2015. It was the third consecutive year the event was held as part of the WeatherTech SportsCar Championship. The 2016 Continental Tire Road Race Showcase was the ninth of twelve scheduled sports car races of 2016 by IMSA, and was the sixth round not held on the held as part of the North American Endurance Cup. The race was held at the fourteen-turn 4.048 mi (6.515 km) Road America in Elkhart Lake, Wisconsin on August 7, 2016.

Before the race, João Barbosa and Christian Fittipaldi led the Prototype Drivers' Championship with 220 points, ahead of Eric Curran and Dane Cameron in second by four points, and Jordan Taylor and Ricky Taylor in third with 211 points. With 267 points, Alex Popow and Renger van der Zande led the Prototype Challenge Drivers' Championship over Robert Alon and Tom Kimber-Smith by 17 points. In GTLM, Oliver Gavin and Tommy Milner led the Drivers' Championship with 228 points, 10 ahead of Ryan Briscoe and Richard Westbrook. In GTD, the Drivers' Championship was led by Alessandro Balzan and Christina Nielsen with 212 points; the duo held a thirteen-point advantage over Andy Lally and John Potter. Chevrolet and Audi were leading their respective Manufacturers' Championships, while Action Express Racing, Starworks Motorsport, Corvette Racing, and Scuderia Corsa each led their own Teams' Championships.

=== Entry list ===
Forty-one cars were officially entered for the Continental Tire Road Race Showcase, with most of the entries in the Prototype Challenge (PC), Grand Touring Le Mans (GTLM) and Grand Touring Daytona (GTD) categories. Action Express Racing (AER) fielded two Chevrolet Corvette DP cars while VisitFlorida Racing (VFR) and Wayne Taylor Racing (WTR) fielded one. Mazda Motorsports had two Lola B12/80 cars and Michael Shank Racing (MSR) entered one Ligier JS P2 chassis with a Honda HR35TT twin-turbocharged 3.5-liter V6 engine. Panoz brought the DeltaWing car to Road America for the fourth successive year. The Prototype Challenge (PC) class was composed of eight Oreca FLM09 cars: three from Starworks Motorsports and two from BAR1 Motorsports. CORE Autosport, JDC-Miller MotorSports, Performance Tech and PR1/Mathiasen Motorsports entered one car each. GTLM was represented by nine entries from five different brands. In the list of GTD entrants, fifteen GT3-specification vehicles were represented by six different manufacturers. Alex Job Racing entered a third Porsche 911 GT3 R. Black Swan Racing withdrew after Tim Pappas' father died.

== Practice ==
There were three practice sessions preceding the start of the race on Sunday, two on Friday and one on Saturday. The first two one-hour sessions were on Friday afternoon and the third on Saturday morning lasted an hour.

In the first session, Bomarito set the fastest time in the No. 55 Mazda with a time of 1 minute, 56.623 seconds, 0.231 seconds faster than teammate Miller in the sister No. 70 Mazda. Ricky Taylor was third quickest in WTR's No. 10 car. The fastest PC class car was Stephen Simpson's No. 85 JDC-Miller Motorsports car with a lap of 2 minutes, 00.519 seconds. Ford occupied first and second in GTLM with Westbrook faster than his teammate Müller by less than four-tenths of a second. Bryan Sellers' No. 48 Paul Miller Lamborghini recorded the fastest time in GTD.

In the second practice session, Negri led with a lap of 1 minute, 55.747 seconds, ahead of Nunez's No. 55 Mazda. The nine-vehicle PC class was led by CORE Autosport's No. 54 car, driven by Braun with a time of 1 minute, 59.060 seconds. With a 2:03.415 lap, Hand led the GTLM class in the No. 66 CGR Ford GT, followed by Luhr's No. 100 RLL BMW M6. Pumpelly led GTD with a time of 2:07.078.

Bomarito led the final practice session in the No. 55 Mazda with a lap of 1 minute, 55.021 seconds. Jordan Taylor's WTR car was second-fastest. A 1:58.898 lap saw van der Zande's No. 8 Starworks vehicle lead PC. With a 2:02.620 lap, García led the GTLM class in the No. 3 Corvette. Sellers led GTD with a time of 2 minutes, 06.753 seconds.

== Qualifying ==
Saturday afternoon's 90-minute four-group qualifying session gave 15-minute sessions to all categories. Cars in GTD were sent out first before those grouped in GTLM, PC, and Prototype had three separate identically timed sessions. Regulations stipulated teams to nominate one qualifying driver, with the fastest laps determining each classes starting order. IMSA would arranged the grid to put all Prototypes ahead of the PC, GTLM, and GTD cars.

=== Qualifying results ===
Pole positions in each class are indicated in bold and by ‡.

Pos.	Class	No.	Team	Driver	Time	Gap	Grid
1	**P**	**55**	**(Japan) Mazda Motorsports**	**(United States) Jonathan Bomarito**	**1:54.507**	–	1‡
2	P	5	(United States) Action Express Racing	(Brazil) Christian Fittipaldi	1:55.659	+1.152	2
3	P	10	(United States) Wayne Taylor Racing	(United States) Ricky Taylor	1:55.685	+1.178	3
4	P	70	(Japan) Mazda Motorsports	(United States) Tom Long	1:56.021	+1.514	4
5	P	31	(United States) Action Express Racing	(United States) Eric Curran	1:56.120	+1.613	5
6	P	90	(United States) VisitFlorida Racing	(Belgium) Marc Goossens	1:56.992	+2.485	6
7	P	0	(United States) Panoz DeltaWing Racing	(United States) Sean Rayhall	1:57.227	+2.720	7
8	**PC**	**38**	**(United States) Performance Tech Motorsports**	**(United States) James French**	**1:59.133**	**+4.626**	8‡
9	PC	7	(United States) Starworks Motorsport	(Mexico) José Gutiérrez	1:59.208	+4.701	17^{1}
10	PC	85	(United States) JDC-Miller MotorSports	(Canada) Misha Goikhberg	1:59.462	+4.955	9
11	PC	20	(United States) BAR1 Motorsports	(United States) Matt McMurry	1:59.519	+5.012	10
12	PC	52	(United States) PR1/Mathiasen Motorsports	(United States) Robert Alon	1:59.625	+5.118	11
13	PC	8	(United States) Starworks Motorsport	(Venezuela) Alex Popow	1:59.634	+5.127	12
14	P	60	(United States) Michael Shank Racing with Curb-Agajanian	(United States) John Pew	2:00.436^{1}	+5.929	13
15	PC	26	(United States) BAR1 Motorsports	(United States) Don Yount	2:01.091	+6.584	14
16	PC	54	(United States) CORE Autosport	(United States) Jon Bennett	2:02.376	+7.869	15
17	**GTLM**	**66**	**(United States) Ford Chip Ganassi Racing**	**(Germany) Dirk Müller**	**2:02.451**	**+7.944**	18‡
18	GTLM	911	(United States) Porsche North America	(France) Patrick Pilet	2:02.912	+8.405	19
19	GTLM	67	(United States) Ford Chip Ganassi Racing	(Australia) Ryan Briscoe	2:02.936	+8.429	39^{2}
20	GTLM	62	(United States) Risi Competizione	(Italy) Giancarlo Fisichella	2:02.975	+8.468	20
21	GTLM	912	(United States) Porsche North America	(New Zealand) Earl Bamber	2:03.173	+8.666	21
22	PC	88	(United States) Starworks Motorsport	(United States) Mark Kvamme	2:03.215	+8.708	16
23	GTLM	3	(United States) Corvette Racing	(Spain) Antonio García	2:03.432	+8.925	22
24	GTLM	4	(United States) Corvette Racing	(United Kingdom) Oliver Gavin	2:03.521	+9.014	23
25	GTLM	100	(United States) BMW Team RLL	(Germany) Lucas Luhr	2:04.129	+9.622	40^{3}
26	GTLM	25	(United States) BMW Team RLL	(United States) Bill Auberlen	2:04.882	+10.375	41^{4}
27	**GTD**	**23**	**(United States) Team Seattle/Alex Job Racing**	**(Spain) Alex Riberas**	**2:07.520**	**+13.013**	24‡
28	GTD	6	(United States) Stevenson Motorsports	(United States) Andrew Davis	2:07.759	+13.252	25
29	GTD	9	(United States) Stevenson Motorsports	(United States) Matt Bell	2:07.785	+13.278	26
30	GTD	33	(United States) Riley Motorsports	(United States) Ben Keating	2:08.166	+13.659	27
31	GTD	63	(United States) Scuderia Corsa	(Denmark) Christina Nielsen	2:08.237	+13.730	28
32	GTD	16	(United States) Change Racing	(United States) Spencer Pumpelly	2:08.243	+13.736	29
33	GTD	27	(United States) Dream Racing	(Italy) Luca Persiani	2:08.334	+13.827	30
34	GTD	48	(United States) Paul Miller Racing	(United States) Madison Snow	2:08.495	+13.988	31
35	GTD	73	(United States) Park Place Motorsports	(United States) Patrick Lindsey	2:08.504	+13.997	32
36	GTD	96	(United States) Turner Motorsport	(United States) Bret Curtis	2:08.680	+14.173	33
37	GTD	97	(United States) Turner Motorsport	(Finland) Markus Palttala	2:09.048	+14.541	34
38	GTD	44	(United States) Magnus Racing	(United States) John Potter	2:09.881	+15.374	38^{5}
39	GTD	80	(United States) Lone Star Racing	(United States) Dan Knox	2:11.251	+16.744	35
40	GTD	77	(United States) Alex Job Racing	(United States) David MacNeil	2:15.449	+20.942	36
41	GTD	22	(United States) Alex Job Racing	(United States) Cooper MacNeil	No time^{6}	–	37
Sources:

- ^{1} The No. 60 MSR Ligier had its fastest lap deleted as penalty for causing a red flag during its qualifying session.
- ^{2} The No. 7 Starworks Motorsport entry was sent to the rear of the PC grid as per 13.1.2a of the Sporting regulations (Ride height).
- ^{3} The No. 67 Ford Chip Ganassi Racing entry was sent to the rear of the GTLM grid as per 13.1.2a of the Sporting regulations (Ride height).
- ^{4} The No. 100 BMW Team RLL entry was sent to the rear of the GTLM grid as per article 8.3.2 of the Sporting regulations (Boost control violation).
- ^{5} The No. 25 BMW Team RLL entry was sent to the rear of the GTLM grid as per article 8.3.2 of the Sporting regulations (Boost control violation).
- ^{6} The No. 44 Magnus Racing Audi was sent to the rear of the GTD grid as per article 40.1.5 of the Sporting regulations (Tire change).
- ^{7} The No. 22 Alex Job Racing Porsche had all qualifying laps forfeited as per Article 40.2.6. of the Sporting regulations (Working on the car during qualifying).

== Race ==
=== Post-race ===
With a total of 253 points, Barbosa and Fittipaldi's second-place finished allowed them to keep their advantage in the Prototype Drivers' Championship, but their advantage was reduced to 1 point by race-winners Curran and Cameron. Popow and van der Zande's sixth-place finish kept them atop the PC Drivers' Championship, but their advantage was reduced to 7 points over race winners Alon and Kimber-Smith. The final results of GTLM allowed Gavin and Milner to extend their advantage in the GTLM Drivers' Championship to 13 points over Briscoe and Westbrook. Balzan and Nielsen's third-place finish allowed them to increase their advantage in the GTD Drivers' Championship to 15 points over Lally and Potter. Bleekemolen and Keating advanced from fifth to fourth while Farnbacher and Riberas dropped to fifth. Chevrolet and Audi continued to top their respective Manufactures' Championships while Action Express Racing, Starworks Motorsport, Corvette Racing, and Scuderia Corsa kept their respective advantages in their of Teams' Championships with three rounds left in the season.

=== Race results ===
Class winners are denoted in bold and ‡. P stands for Prototype, PC (Prototype Challenge), GTLM (Grand Touring Le Mans) and GTD (Grand Touring Daytona).

Final race classification
Pos	Class	No.	Team	Drivers	Chassis	Tire	Laps	Time/Retired
Pos	Class	No.	Team	Drivers	Engine	Tire	Laps	Time/Retired
1	**P**	**31**	**(United States) Action Express Racing**	**(United States) Eric Curran (United States) Dane Cameron**	**Corvette Daytona Prototype**	C	**73**	**2:40:56.808‡**
1	**P**	**31**	**(United States) Action Express Racing**	**(United States) Eric Curran (United States) Dane Cameron**	**Chevrolet 5.5 L V8**	C	**73**	**2:40:56.808‡**
2	P	5	(United States) Action Express Racing	(Portugal) João Barbosa (Brazil) Christian Fittipaldi	Corvette Daytona Prototype	C	73	+0.626
2	P	5	(United States) Action Express Racing	(Portugal) João Barbosa (Brazil) Christian Fittipaldi	Chevrolet 5.5 L V8	C	73	+0.626
3	P	10	(United States) Wayne Taylor Racing	(United States) Jordan Taylor (United States) Ricky Taylor	Corvette Daytona Prototype	C	73	+1.460
3	P	10	(United States) Wayne Taylor Racing	(United States) Jordan Taylor (United States) Ricky Taylor	Chevrolet 5.5 L V8	C	73	+1.460
4	P	60	(United States) Michael Shank Racing with Curb-Agajanian	(United States) John Pew (Brazil) Oswaldo Negri Jr.	Ligier JS P2	C	73	+18.283
4	P	60	(United States) Michael Shank Racing with Curb-Agajanian	(United States) John Pew (Brazil) Oswaldo Negri Jr.	Honda HR35TT 3.5 Turbo V6	C	73	+18.283
5	P	55	(Japan) Mazda Motorsports	(United States) Jonathan Bomarito (United States) Tristan Nunez	Mazda Prototype	C	73	+22.114
5	P	55	(Japan) Mazda Motorsports	(United States) Jonathan Bomarito (United States) Tristan Nunez	Mazda MZ-2.0T 2.0 L I4 Turbo	C	73	+22.114
6	P	90	(United States) VisitFlorida Racing	(Belgium) Marc Goossens (United Kingdom) Ryan Dalziel	Corvette Daytona Prototype	C	73	+34.499
6	P	90	(United States) VisitFlorida Racing	(Belgium) Marc Goossens (United Kingdom) Ryan Dalziel	Chevrolet 5.5 L V8	C	73	+34.499
7	**PC**	**52**	**(United States) PR1/Mathiasen Motorsports**	**(United States) Robert Alon (United Kingdom) Tom Kimber-Smith**	**Oreca FLM09**	C	**72**	**+1 lap‡**
7	**PC**	**52**	**(United States) PR1/Mathiasen Motorsports**	**(United States) Robert Alon (United Kingdom) Tom Kimber-Smith**	**Chevrolet 6.2 L V8**	C	**72**	**+1 lap‡**
8	PC	54	(United States) CORE Autosport	(United States) Jon Bennett (United States) Colin Braun	Oreca FLM09	C	72	+1 lap
8	PC	54	(United States) CORE Autosport	(United States) Jon Bennett (United States) Colin Braun	Chevrolet 6.2 L V8	C	72	+1 lap
9	PC	38	(United States) Performance Tech Motorsports	(United States) James French (Canada) Kyle Marcelli	Oreca FLM09	C	72	+1 lap
9	PC	38	(United States) Performance Tech Motorsports	(United States) James French (Canada) Kyle Marcelli	Chevrolet 6.2 L V8	C	72	+1 lap
10	PC	7	(United States) Starworks Motorsport	(Mexico) José Gutiérrez (Colombia) Gustavo Yacamán	Oreca FLM09	C	72	+1 lap
10	PC	7	(United States) Starworks Motorsport	(Mexico) José Gutiérrez (Colombia) Gustavo Yacamán	Chevrolet 6.2 L V8	C	72	+1 lap
11	PC	20	(United States) BAR1 Motorsports	(United States) Matt McMurry (Brazil) Bruno Junqueira	Oreca FLM09	C	72	+1 lap
11	PC	20	(United States) BAR1 Motorsports	(United States) Matt McMurry (Brazil) Bruno Junqueira	Chevrolet 6.2 L V8	C	72	+1 lap
12	P	0	(United States) Panoz DeltaWing Racing	(United Kingdom) Katherine Legge (United States) Sean Rayhall	DeltaWing DWC13	C	72	+1 lap
12	P	0	(United States) Panoz DeltaWing Racing	(United Kingdom) Katherine Legge (United States) Sean Rayhall	Élan (Mazda) 1.9 L I4 Turbo	C	72	+1 lap
13	**GTLM**	**4**	**(United States) Corvette Racing**	**(United Kingdom) Oliver Gavin (United States) Tommy Milner**	**Chevrolet Corvette C7.R**	MI	**70**	**+3 Laps‡**
13	**GTLM**	**4**	**(United States) Corvette Racing**	**(United Kingdom) Oliver Gavin (United States) Tommy Milner**	**Chevrolet LT5.5 5.5 L V8**	MI	**70**	**+3 Laps‡**
14	GTLM	67	(United States) Ford Chip Ganassi Racing	(Australia) Ryan Briscoe (United Kingdom) Richard Westbrook	Ford GT	MI	70	+3 Laps
14	GTLM	67	(United States) Ford Chip Ganassi Racing	(Australia) Ryan Briscoe (United Kingdom) Richard Westbrook	Ford EcoBoost 3.5 L Twin-turbo V6	MI	70	+3 Laps
15	GTLM	100	(United States) BMW Team RLL	(United States) John Edwards (Germany) Lucas Luhr	BMW M6 GTLM	MI	70	+3 Laps
15	GTLM	100	(United States) BMW Team RLL	(United States) John Edwards (Germany) Lucas Luhr	BMW 4.4 L Turbo V8	MI	70	+3 Laps
16	GTLM	912	(United States) Porsche North America	(New Zealand) Earl Bamber (France) Frédéric Makowiecki	Porsche 911 RSR	MI	70	+3 Laps
16	GTLM	912	(United States) Porsche North America	(New Zealand) Earl Bamber (France) Frédéric Makowiecki	Porsche 4.0 L Flat-6	MI	70	+3 Laps
17	GTLM	62	(United States) Risi Competizione	(Finland) Toni Vilander (Italy) Giancarlo Fisichella	Ferrari 488 GTE	MI	70	+3 Laps
17	GTLM	62	(United States) Risi Competizione	(Finland) Toni Vilander (Italy) Giancarlo Fisichella	Ferrari F154CB 3.9 L Turbo V8	MI	70	+3 Laps
18	GTLM	3	(United States) Corvette Racing	(Spain) Antonio García (Denmark) Jan Magnussen	Chevrolet Corvette C7.R	MI	70	+3 Laps
18	GTLM	3	(United States) Corvette Racing	(Spain) Antonio García (Denmark) Jan Magnussen	Chevrolet LT5.5 5.5 L V8	MI	70	+3 Laps
19	GTLM	911	(United States) Porsche North America	(France) Patrick Pilet (United Kingdom) Nick Tandy	Porsche 911 RSR	MI	70	+3 Laps
19	GTLM	911	(United States) Porsche North America	(France) Patrick Pilet (United Kingdom) Nick Tandy	Porsche 4.0 L Flat-6	MI	70	+3 Laps
20	GTLM	25	(United States) BMW Team RLL	(United States) Bill Auberlen (Germany) Dirk Werner	BMW M6 GTLM	MI	69	+4 Laps
20	GTLM	25	(United States) BMW Team RLL	(United States) Bill Auberlen (Germany) Dirk Werner	BMW 4.4 L Turbo V8	MI	69	+4 Laps
21	**GTD**	**33**	**(United States) Riley Motorsports**	**(Netherlands) Jeroen Bleekemolen (United States) Ben Keating**	**Dodge Viper GT3-R**	C	**69**	**+1 lap‡**
21	**GTD**	**33**	**(United States) Riley Motorsports**	**(Netherlands) Jeroen Bleekemolen (United States) Ben Keating**	**Dodge 8.3L V10**	C	**69**	**+1 lap‡**
22	GTD	73	(United States) Park Place Motorsports	(Germany) Jörg Bergmeister (United States) Patrick Lindsey	Porsche 911 GT3 R	C	69	+4 Laps
22	GTD	73	(United States) Park Place Motorsports	(Germany) Jörg Bergmeister (United States) Patrick Lindsey	Porsche 4.0 L Flat-6	C	69	+4 Laps
23	GTD	63	(United States) Scuderia Corsa	(Denmark) Christina Nielsen (Italy) Alessandro Balzan	Ferrari 488 GT3	C	69	+4 Laps
23	GTD	63	(United States) Scuderia Corsa	(Denmark) Christina Nielsen (Italy) Alessandro Balzan	Ferrari F154CB 3.9 L Turbo V8	C	69	+4 Laps
24	GTD	44	(United States) Magnus Racing	(United States) John Potter (United States) Andy Lally	Audi R8 LMS	C	69	+4 Laps
24	GTD	44	(United States) Magnus Racing	(United States) John Potter (United States) Andy Lally	Audi 5.2L V10	C	69	+4 Laps
25	GTD	6	(United States) Stevenson Motorsports	(United States) Andrew Davis (United Kingdom) Robin Liddell	Audi R8 LMS	C	69	+4 Laps
25	GTD	6	(United States) Stevenson Motorsports	(United States) Andrew Davis (United Kingdom) Robin Liddell	Audi 5.2L V10	C	69	+4 Laps
26	GTD	9	(United States) Stevenson Motorsports	(United States) Lawson Aschenbach (United States) Matt Bell	Audi R8 LMS	C	69	+4 Laps
26	GTD	9	(United States) Stevenson Motorsports	(United States) Lawson Aschenbach (United States) Matt Bell	Audi 5.2L V10	C	69	+4 Laps
27	GTD	96	(United States) Turner Motorsport	(United States) Bret Curtis (Germany) Jens Klingmann	BMW M6 GT3	C	69	+4 Laps
27	GTD	96	(United States) Turner Motorsport	(United States) Bret Curtis (Germany) Jens Klingmann	BMW 4.4 L Turbo V8	C	69	+4 Laps
28	GTD	48	(United States) Paul Miller Racing	(United States) Bryan Sellers (United States) Madison Snow	Lamborghini Huracán GT3	C	69	+4 Laps
28	GTD	48	(United States) Paul Miller Racing	(United States) Bryan Sellers (United States) Madison Snow	Lamborghini 5.2 L V10	C	69	+4 Laps
29	GTD	97	(United States) Turner Motorsport	(United States) Michael Marsal (Finland) Markus Palttala	BMW M6 GT3	C	69	+4 Laps
29	GTD	97	(United States) Turner Motorsport	(United States) Michael Marsal (Finland) Markus Palttala	BMW 4.4 L Turbo V8	C	69	+4 Laps
30	GTD	80	(United States) Lone Star Racing	(United States) Dan Knox (United States) Mike Skeen	Dodge Viper GT3-R	C	69	+4 Laps
30	GTD	80	(United States) Lone Star Racing	(United States) Dan Knox (United States) Mike Skeen	Dodge 8.3L V10	C	69	+4 Laps
31	GTD	22	(United States) Alex Job Racing	(United States) Cooper MacNeil (Germany) Sven Müller	Porsche 911 GT3 R	C	69	+4 Laps
31	GTD	22	(United States) Alex Job Racing	(United States) Cooper MacNeil (Germany) Sven Müller	Porsche 4.0 L Flat-6	C	69	+4 Laps
32	GTD	23	(United States) Team Seattle/Alex Job Racing	(Germany) Mario Farnbacher (Spain) Alex Riberas	Porsche 911 GT3 R	C	69	+4 Laps
32	GTD	23	(United States) Team Seattle/Alex Job Racing	(Germany) Mario Farnbacher (Spain) Alex Riberas	Porsche 4.0 L Flat-6	C	69	+4 Laps
33	GTD	77	(United States) Alex Job Racing	(United States) Gunnar Jeannette (United States) David MacNeil	Porsche 911 GT3 R	C	69	+4 Laps
33	GTD	77	(United States) Alex Job Racing	(United States) Gunnar Jeannette (United States) David MacNeil	Porsche 4.0 L Flat-6	C	69	+4 Laps
34	GTD	16	(United States) Change Racing	(United States) Corey Lewis (United States) Spencer Pumpelly	Lamborghini Huracán GT3	C	68	+5 Laps
34	GTD	16	(United States) Change Racing	(United States) Corey Lewis (United States) Spencer Pumpelly	Lamborghini 5.2 L V10	C	68	+5 Laps
35	GTLM	66	(United States) Ford Chip Ganassi Racing	(Germany) Dirk Müller (United States) Joey Hand	Ford GT	MI	67	+6 Lpas
35	GTLM	66	(United States) Ford Chip Ganassi Racing	(Germany) Dirk Müller (United States) Joey Hand	Ford EcoBoost 3.5 L Twin-turbo V6	MI	67	+6 Lpas
36 PC	PC	8	(United States) Starworks Motorsport	(Venezuela) Alex Popow (Netherlands) Renger van der Zande	Oreca FLM09	C	66	Accident
36 PC	PC	8	(United States) Starworks Motorsport	(Venezuela) Alex Popow (Netherlands) Renger van der Zande	Chevrolet 6.2 L V8	C	66	Accident
37 DNF	PC	85	(United States) JDC-Miller MotorSports	(Canada) Misha Goikhberg (South Africa) Stephen Simpson	Oreca FLM09	C	66	Accident
37 DNF	PC	85	(United States) JDC-Miller MotorSports	(Canada) Misha Goikhberg (South Africa) Stephen Simpson	Chevrolet 6.2 L V8	C	66	Accident
38	PC	26	(United States) BAR1 Motorsports	(United States) Don Yount (United Kingdom) Johnny Mowlem	Oreca FLM09	C	65	+8 Laps
38	PC	26	(United States) BAR1 Motorsports	(United States) Don Yount (United Kingdom) Johnny Mowlem	Chevrolet 6.2 L V8	C	65	+8 Laps
39 DNF	GTD	27	(United States) Dream Racing	(Italy) Luca Persiani (Monaco) Cédric Sbirrazzuoli	Lamborghini Huracán GT3	C	44	Did Not Finish
39 DNF	GTD	27	(United States) Dream Racing	(Italy) Luca Persiani (Monaco) Cédric Sbirrazzuoli	Lamborghini 5.2 L V10	C	44	Did Not Finish
40 DNF	PC	88	(United States) Starworks Motorsport	(United States) Mark Kvamme (United Kingdom) Richard Bradley	Oreca FLM09	C	25	Accident
40 DNF	PC	88	(United States) Starworks Motorsport	(United States) Mark Kvamme (United Kingdom) Richard Bradley	Chevrolet 6.2 L V8	C	25	Accident
41 DNF	P	70	(Japan) Mazda Motorsports	(United States) Tom Long (United States) Joel Miller	Mazda Prototype	C	6	Oil pump
41 DNF	P	70	(Japan) Mazda Motorsports	(United States) Tom Long (United States) Joel Miller	Mazda MZ-2.0T 2.0 L I4 Turbo	C	6	Oil pump

Tyre manufacturers
Key
Symbol	Tyre manufacturer
**C**	Continental
**MI**	Michelin

== Championship standings after the race ==
Prototype Drivers' Championship standings
Pos.	+/–	Driver	Points
1		(Portugal) João Barbosa (Brazil) Christian Fittipaldi	253
2		(United States) Eric Curran (United States) Dane Cameron	252
3		(United States) Jordan Taylor (United States) Ricky Taylor	242
4		(Belgium) Marc Goossens	223
5		(Brazil) Oswaldo Negri Jr.	220

PC Drivers' Championship standings
Pos.	+/–	Driver	Points
1		(Venezuela) Alex Popow (Netherlands) Renger van der Zande	293
2		(United States) Robert Alon (United Kingdom) Tom Kimber-Smith	286
3		(South Africa) Stephen Simpson (Canada) Misha Goikhberg	260
4		(United States) Jon Bennett (United States) Colin Braun	245
5		(United States) James French (Canada) Kyle Marcelli	241

GTLM Drivers' Championship standings
Pos.	+/–	Driver	Points
1		(United Kingdom) Oliver Gavin (United States) Tommy Milner	264
2		(Australia) Ryan Briscoe (United Kingdom) Richard Westbrook	251
3		(Spain) Antonio García (Denmark) Jan Magnussen	223
4	1	(Italy) Giancarlo Fisichella (Finland) Toni Vilander	220
5	1	(United States) Bill Auberlen (Germany) Dirk Werner	219

GTD Drivers' Championship standings
Pos.	+/–	Driver	Points
1		(Italy) Alessandro Balzan (Denmark) Christina Nielsen	243
2		(United States) Andy Lally (United States) John Potter	228
3	1	(Netherlands) Jeroen Bleekemolen (United States) Ben Keating	222
4	1	(United States) Andrew Davis (United Kingdom) Robin Liddell	212
5	2	(Germany) Mario Farnbacher (Spain) Alex Riberas	207

- Note: Only the top five positions are included for all sets of standings.

Prototype Teams' Championship standings
Pos.	+/–	Team	Points
1		(United States) No. 5 Action Express Racing	253
2		(United States) No. 31 Action Express Racing	252
3		(United States) No. 10 Wayne Taylor Racing	242
4		(United States) No. 90 VisitFlorida Racing	223
5		(United States) No. 60 Michael Shank Racing with Curb-Agajanian	220

PC Teams' Championship standings
Pos.	+/–	Team	Points
1		(United States) No. 8 Starworks Motorsport	293
2		(United States) No. 52 PR1/Mathiasen Motorsports	286
3		(United States) No. 54 CORE Autosport	268
4		(United States) No. 85 JDC-Miller MotorSports	266
5		(United States) No. 38 Performance Tech Motorsports	260

GTLM Teams' Championship standings
Pos.	+/–	Team	Points
1		(United States) No. 4 Corvette Racing	264
2		(United States) No. 67 Ford Chip Ganassi Racing	251
3		(United States) No. 3 Corvette Racing	223
4	1	(United States) No. 62 Risi Competizione	220
5	1	(United States) No. 25 BMW Team RLL	219

GTD Teams' Championship standings
Pos.	+/–	Team	Points
1		(United States) No. 63 Scuderia Corsa	243
2		(United States) No. 44 Magnus Racing	228
3	1	(United States) No. 33 Riley Motorsports	222
4	1	(United States) No. 6 Stevenson Motorsports	212
5	2	(United States) No. 23 Team Seattle/Alex Job Racing	207

- Note: Only the top five positions are included for all sets of standings.

Prototype Manufacturers' Championship standings
Pos.	+/–	Manufacturer	Points
1		(United States) Chevrolet	271
2		(Japan) Honda	259
3		(Japan) Mazda	242
4		(Germany) BMW	56
5		(United States) Ford	30

GTLM Manufacturers' Championship standings
Pos.	+/–	Manufacturer	Points
1		(United States) Chevrolet	262
2		(United States) Ford	249
3		(Germany) Porsche	237
4	1	(Germany) BMW	230
5	1	(Italy) Ferrari	230

GTD Manufacturers' Championship standings
Pos.	+/–	Manufacturer	Points
1		(Germany) Audi	248
2	1	(Germany) Porsche	241
3	1	(Italy) Ferrari	240
4		(United States) Dodge	234
5		(Germany) BMW	223

- Note: Only the top five positions are included for all sets of standings.

IMSA SportsCar Championship
Previous race: Northeast Grand Prix	2016 season	Next race: Oak Tree Grand Prix
