= 2016 Lone Star Le Mans =

Eleventh round of the 2016 IMSA SportsCar Championship season

Map of the Circuit of the Americas - Grand Prix Circuit

The 2016 Lone Star Le Mans was a sports car race sanctioned by the International Motor Sports Association (IMSA). The race was held at Circuit of the Americas in Austin, Texas on September 17, 2016. The race was the eleventh round of the 2016 IMSA SportsCar Championship.

== Background ==
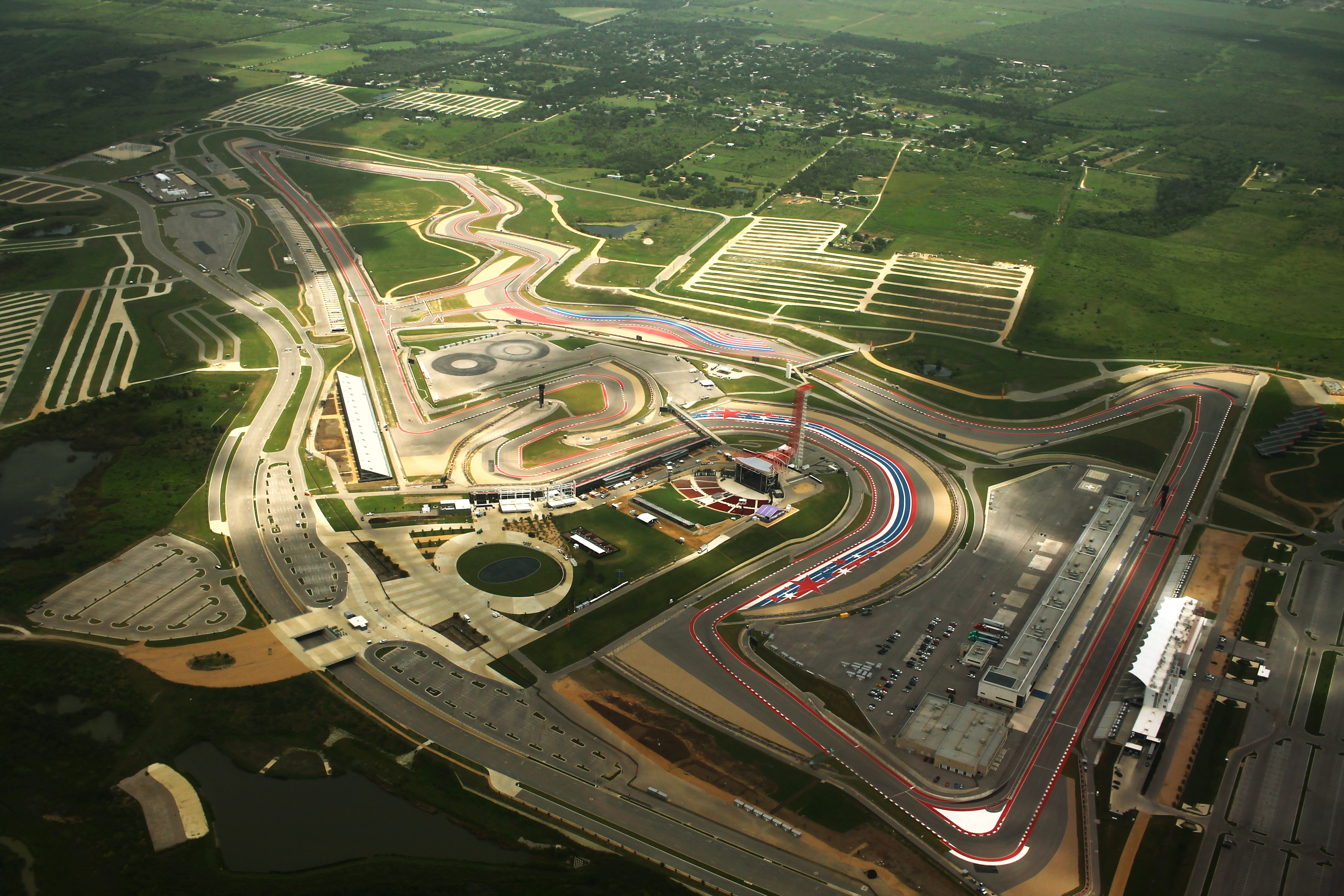
Circuit of the Americas (pictured in 2015), where the race was held.

=== Preview ===
International Motor Sports Association (IMSA) president Scott Atherton confirmed the race was part of the schedule for the 2016 IMSA SportsCar Championship (IMSA SCC) in August 2015. It was the third consecutive year the event was held as part of the WeatherTech SportsCar Championship. The 2016 Lone Star Le Mans was the eleventh of twelve scheduled sports car races of 2016 by IMSA, and was the eighth round not held on the held as part of the North American Endurance Cup. The race was held at the twenty-turn 3.426 mi (5.514 km) Circuit of the Americas in Austin, Texas on September 17, 2016.

IMSA altered the balance of performance to try to create parity within the Prototype, GTLM, and GTD categories. The Ligier JS P2 had its weight lowered by 10 kg (22 lb). The DeltaWing DWC13 received an increase in turbo boost pressure. The Lola B12/80 had its refueling hose restrictor increased by 1 mm (0.039 in). The BMW M6 GTLM had its weight increased by 10 kg (22 lb) and received a 0.5 mm (0.020 in) larger refueling hose restrictor while the Ford GT had a 1 mm (0.039 in) refueling restrictor reduction. The Ferrari 488 GTE received an increase in turbo boost pressure, a 1-liter fuel capacity increase, and a 0.5 mm (0.020 in) larger refueling hose restrictor. The Ferrari 488 GT3 received an increase in turbo boost pressure and a 1-liter fuel capacity increase. The Porsche 911 GT3 R received a 2 mm (0.079 in) larger air restrictor, a 1-liter fuel capacity increase, and a 1 mm (0.039 in) larger refueling hose restrictor. The BMW M6 GT3 and Lamborghini Huracán GT3 had their refueling restrictors increased by 1 mm (0.039 in) while the Dodge Viper GT3-R and Ferrari 488 GT3 received their fuel restrictors reduced by 0.5 mm (0.020 in).

Before the race, João Barbosa and Christian Fittipaldi led the Prototype Drivers' Championship with 253 points, ahead of Eric Curran and Dane Cameron in second by one point, and Jordan Taylor and Ricky Taylor in third with 242 points. With 293 points, Alex Popow and Renger van der Zande led the Prototype Challenge Drivers' Championship over Robert Alon and Tom Kimber-Smith by 7 points. In GTLM, Oliver Gavin and Tommy Milner led the Drivers' Championship with 287 points, 7 ahead of Ryan Briscoe and Richard Westbrook. In GTD, the Drivers' Championship was led by Alessandro Balzan and Christina Nielsen with 268 points; the duo held a twenty-point advantage over Jeroen Bleekemolen and Ben Keating. Chevrolet and Audi were leading their respective Manufacturers' Championships, while Action Express Racing, Starworks Motorsport, Corvette Racing, and Scuderia Corsa each led their own Teams' Championships.

=== Entry list ===
Thirty-nine cars were officially entered for the Lone Star Le Mans, with most of the entries in the Prototype Challenge (PC), Grand Touring Le Mans (GTLM) and Grand Touring Daytona (GTD) categories. Action Express Racing (AER) fielded two Chevrolet Corvette DP cars while VisitFlorida Racing (VFR) and Wayne Taylor Racing (WTR) fielded one. Mazda Motorsports had two Lola B12/80 cars and Michael Shank Racing (MSR) entered one Ligier JS P2 chassis with a Honda HR35TT twin-turbocharged 3.5-liter V6 engine. Panoz brought the DeltaWing car to Circuit of the Americas for the fourth successive year. The Prototype Challenge (PC) class was composed of eight Oreca FLM09 cars: three from Starworks Motorsports and two from BAR1 Motorsports. JDC-Miller MotorSports, Performance Tech and PR1/Mathiasen Motorsports entered one car each. Although it was listed as an entrant, CORE Autosport's No. 54 car withdrew from the event due to the team prepping for 2017. GTLM was represented by nine entries from five different brands. In the list of GTD entrants, fourteen GT3-specification vehicles were represented by seven different manufacturers. The No. 007 The Racer's Group Aston Martin V12 Vantage GT3 was reinstated to the WeatherTech SportsCar Championship after making its first appearance since the Laguna Seca round.

== Practice ==
There were three practice sessions preceding the start of the race on Saturday, two on Thursday and one on Friday. The first two one-hour sessions were on Thursday morning and afternoon. The third on Friday morning lasted an hour.

In the first session, Barbosa set the fastest time in the No. 5 AER Corvette DP with a time of 1 minute, 58.813 seconds, 0.105 seconds faster than teammate Cameron in the sister No. 31 AER car. The fastest PC car was Kimber-Smith's No. 52 PR1/Mathiasen Motorsports car with a lap of 2 minutes, 01.131 seconds. With a 2:04.638 lap, Dirk Müller led the GTLM class in the No. 66 CGR Ford GT, followed by Pilet's No. 911 Porsche. Jens Klingmann's No. 96 Turner Motorsport BMW M6 recorded the fastest time in GTD.

In the second session, Cameron led with a lap of 1 minute, 58.139 seconds, ahead of Jordan Taylor's WTR car. The eight-vehicle PC class was led by Starworks' No. 88 car, driven by Bradley with a time of 2 minutes, 01.367 seconds. Ford paced GTLM with Westbrook's No. 67 CGR car lapping 2:04.107 from Giancarlo Fisichella's second-placed Risi Competizione Ferrari 488 GTE. With a 2:08.174 lap, Markus Palttala led the GTD class in the No. 97 Turner Motorsport BMW M6, followed by Balzan's Scuderia Corsa 488 GT3.

Miller led the final practice session in the No. 70 Mazda with a lap of 1 minute, 58.033 seconds. Ricky Taylor's WTR car was second-fastest. A 2:00.238 lap saw Kimber-Smith's PR1/Mathiasen Motorsports car lead PC over van der Zande's No. 8 Starworks entry. Ferrari paced GTLM with Risi Competizione's 488 of Vilander lapping 2:03.380, ahead of the two Ford GTs. Alex Riberas in the No. 23 Team Seattle/Alex Job Racing Porsche was fastest in GTD with a time of 2 minutes, 07.116 seconds.

== Qualifying ==
Friday afternoon's 90-minute four-group qualifying session gave 15-minute sessions to all categories. Cars in GTD were sent out first before those grouped in GTLM, PC, and Prototype had three separate identically timed sessions. Regulations stipulated teams to nominate one qualifying driver, with the fastest laps determining each classes starting order. IMSA would arranged the grid to put all Prototypes ahead of the PC, GTLM, and GTD cars.

=== Qualifying results ===
Pole positions in each class are indicated in bold and by ‡.

Pos.	Class	No.	Team	Driver	Time	Gap	Grid
1	**P**	**10**	**(United States) Wayne Taylor Racing**	**(United States) Ricky Taylor**	**1:58.712**	**_**	1‡
2	P	55	(Japan) Mazda Motorsports	(United States) Tristan Nunez	1:58.715	+0.003	2
3	P	70	(Japan) Mazda Motorsports	(United States) Joel Miller	1:59.120	+0.408	3
4	P	31	(United States) Action Express Racing	(United States) Eric Curran	1:59.199	+0.487	4
5	P	5	(United States) Action Express Racing	(Brazil) Christian Fittipaldi	1:59.421	+0.709	5
6	P	0	(United States) Panoz DeltaWing Racing	(United States) Sean Rayhall	2:00.030	+1.318	6
7	P	90	(United States) VisitFlorida Racing	(Belgium) Marc Goossens	2:00.506	+1.794	7
8	**PC**	**52**	**(United States) PR1/Mathiasen Motorsports**	**(United States) Robert Alon**	**2:01.847**	**+3.135**	8‡
9	PC	7	(United States) Starworks Motorsport	(Mexico) José Gutiérrez	2:02.271	+3.559	9
10	PC	8	(United States) Starworks Motorsport	(Venezuela) Alex Popow	2:02.274	+3.562	10
11	PC	20	(United States) BAR1 Motorsports	(United States) Matt McMurry	2:02.305	+3.593	11
12	P	60	(United States) Michael Shank Racing with Curb-Agajanian	(United States) John Pew	2:02.595	+3.883	16^{1}
13	PC	38	(United States) Performance Tech Motorsports	(United States) Nicholas Boulle	2:03.420	+4.708	12
14	PC	85	(United States) JDC-Miller MotorSports	(Canada) Misha Goikhberg	2:03.527	+4.815	13
15	**GTLM**	**67**	**(United States) Ford Chip Ganassi Racing**	**(Australia) Ryan Briscoe**	**2:04.188**	**+5.476**	17‡
16	GTLM	62	(United States) Risi Competizione	(Finland) Toni Vilander	2:04.694	+5.982	18
17	GTLM	911	(United States) Porsche North America	(France) Patrick Pilet	2:04.874	+6.162	19
18	GTLM	912	(United States) Porsche North America	(France) Frédéric Makowiecki	2:05.002	+6.290	20
19	GTLM	66	(United States) Ford Chip Ganassi Racing	(Germany) Dirk Müller	2:05.084	+6.372	21
20	GTLM	4	(United States) Corvette Racing	(United Kingdom) Oliver Gavin	2:05.190	+6.478	22
21	GTLM	25	(United States) BMW Team RLL	(Germany) Dirk Werner	2:05.230	+6.518	23
22	GTLM	3	(United States) Corvette Racing	(Denmark) Jan Magnussen	2:05.461	+6.749	24
23	GTLM	100	(United States) BMW Team RLL	(United States) John Edwards	2:05.737	+7.025	25
24	PC	26	(United States) BAR1 Motorsports	(United States) Don Yount	2:05.971	+7.259	14
25	**GTD**	**23**	**(United States) Team Seattle/Alex Job Racing**	**(Spain) Alex Riberas**	**2:08.568**	**+9.856**	26‡
26	GTD	9	(United States) Stevenson Motorsports	(United States) Lawson Aschenbach	2:08.944	+10.232	27
27	GTD	73	(United States) Park Place Motorsports	(United States) Patrick Lindsey	2:09.009	+10.297	28
28	PC	88	(United States) Starworks Motorsport	(United States) Mark Kvamme	2:09.616^{2}	+10.904	15
29	GTD	6	(United States) Stevenson Motorsports	(United States) Andrew Davis	2:09.744	+11.032	29
30	GTD	63	(United States) Scuderia Corsa	(Denmark) Christina Nielsen	2:09.756	+11.044	30
31	GTD	48	(United States) Paul Miller Racing	(United States) Madison Snow	2:09.841	+11.129	31
32	GTD	27	(United States) Dream Racing	(Italy) Paolo Ruberti	2:09.913	+11.201	32
33	GTD	16	(United States) Change Racing	(United States) Corey Lewis	2:10.174	+11.462	33
34	GTD	96	(United States) Turner Motorsport	(United States) Bret Curtis	2:10.612	+11.900	34
35	GTD	33	(United States) Riley Motorsports	(United States) Ben Keating	2:10.979	+12.267	39^{3}
36	GTD	44	(United States) Magnus Racing	(United States) John Potter	2:11.089	+12.377	35
37	GTD	97	(United States) Turner Motorsport	(United States) Michael Marsal	2:11.357	+12.645	36
38	GTD	80	(United States) Lone Star Racing	(United States) Dan Knox	2:11.536	+12.824	37
39	GTD	007	(United States) TRG-AMR	(Australia) David Calvert-Jones	2:12.181	+13.469	38
Sources:

- ^{1} The No. 60 MSR Ligier was sent to the back of the Prototype grid as per 43.1 of the Sporting regulations (Starting driver change).
- ^{2} The No. 88 Starworks Motorsport had its fastest lap deleted as penalty for causing a red flag during its qualifying session.
- ^{3} The No. 33 Riley Motorsports Dodge was sent to the back of the GTD grid as per 40.1.5 of the Sporting regulations (Tire change).

== Race ==
=== post-race ===
With a total of 285 points, Curran and Cameron's second-place finish allowed them to take the lead of the Prototype Drivers' Championship. Popow and van der Zande's victory allowed them to increase their advantage in the PC Drivers' Championship by 3 points over Alon and Kimber-Smith. The final results of GTLM meant that Gavin and Milner extended their advantage to 11 points in the Drivers' Championship over Briscoe and Westbrook. Balzan and Nielsen's third-place finish allowed them to increase their advantage in the GTD Drivers' Championship to 32 points over Bleekemolen and Keating. Chevrolet and Audi continued to top their respective Manufactures' Championships while Action Express Racing, Starworks Motorsport, Corvette Racing, and Scuderia Corsa kept their respective advantages in their of Teams' Championships with one round left in the season.

=== Race results ===
Class winners are denoted in bold and ‡. P stands for Prototype, PC (Prototype Challenge), GTLM (Grand Touring Le Mans) and GTD (Grand Touring Daytona).

Final race classification
Pos	Class	No.	Team	Drivers	Chassis	Tire	Laps	Time/Retired
Pos	Class	No.	Team	Drivers	Engine	Tire	Laps	Time/Retired
**1**	**P**	**10**	**(United States) Wayne Taylor Racing**	**(United States) Jordan Taylor (United States) Ricky Taylor**	**Corvette Daytona Prototype**	C	**75**	**2:41:55.076‡**
**1**	**P**	**10**	**(United States) Wayne Taylor Racing**	**(United States) Jordan Taylor (United States) Ricky Taylor**	**Chevrolet 5.5 L V8**	C	**75**	**2:41:55.076‡**
2	P	31	(United States) Action Express Racing	(United States) Eric Curran (United States) Dane Cameron	Corvette Daytona Prototype	C	75	+1.421
2	P	31	(United States) Action Express Racing	(United States) Eric Curran (United States) Dane Cameron	Chevrolet 5.5 L V8	C	75	+1.421
3	P	5	(United States) Action Express Racing	(Portugal) João Barbosa (Brazil) Christian Fittipaldi	Corvette Daytona Prototype	C	75	+47.256
3	P	5	(United States) Action Express Racing	(Portugal) João Barbosa (Brazil) Christian Fittipaldi	Chevrolet 5.5 L V8	C	75	+47.256
4	P	70	(Japan) Mazda Motorsports	(United States) Tom Long (United States) Joel Miller	Mazda Prototype	C	75	+1:46.420
4	P	70	(Japan) Mazda Motorsports	(United States) Tom Long (United States) Joel Miller	Mazda MZ-2.0T 2.0 L I4 Turbo	C	75	+1:46.420
**5**	**PC**	**8**	**(United States) Starworks Motorsport**	**(Venezuela) Alex Popow (Netherlands) Renger van der Zande**	**Oreca FLM09**	C	**74**	**+1 lap‡**
**5**	**PC**	**8**	**(United States) Starworks Motorsport**	**(Venezuela) Alex Popow (Netherlands) Renger van der Zande**	**Chevrolet 6.2 L V8**	C	**74**	**+1 lap‡**
6	PC	52	(United States) PR1/Mathiasen Motorsports	(United States) Robert Alon (United Kingdom) Tom Kimber-Smith	Oreca FLM09	C	74	+1 lap
6	PC	52	(United States) PR1/Mathiasen Motorsports	(United States) Robert Alon (United Kingdom) Tom Kimber-Smith	Chevrolet 6.2 L V8	C	74	+1 lap
7	PC	38	(United States) Performance Tech Motorsports	(United States) James French (United States) Nicholas Boulle	Oreca FLM09	C	74	+1 lap
7	PC	38	(United States) Performance Tech Motorsports	(United States) James French (United States) Nicholas Boulle	Chevrolet 6.2 L V8	C	74	+1 lap
8	P	0	(United States) Panoz DeltaWing Racing	(United Kingdom) Katherine Legge (United States) Sean Rayhall	DeltaWing DWC13	C	74	+1 lap
8	P	0	(United States) Panoz DeltaWing Racing	(United Kingdom) Katherine Legge (United States) Sean Rayhall	Élan (Mazda) 1.9 L I4 Turbo	C	74	+1 lap
9	PC	20	(United States) BAR1 Motorsports	(United States) Matt McMurry (Brazil) Bruno Junqueira	Oreca FLM09	C	74	+1 lap
9	PC	20	(United States) BAR1 Motorsports	(United States) Matt McMurry (Brazil) Bruno Junqueira	Chevrolet 6.2 L V8	C	74	+1 lap
**10**	**GTLM**	**912**	**(United States) Porsche North America**	**(New Zealand) Earl Bamber (France) Frédéric Makowiecki**	**Porsche 911 RSR**	M	**74**	**+1 lap‡**
**10**	**GTLM**	**912**	**(United States) Porsche North America**	**(New Zealand) Earl Bamber (France) Frédéric Makowiecki**	**Porsche 4.0 L Flat-6**	M	**74**	**+1 lap‡**
11	PC	7	(United States) Starworks Motorsport	(Mexico) José Gutiérrez (Colombia) Gustavo Yacamán	Oreca FLM09	C	74	+1 lap
11	PC	7	(United States) Starworks Motorsport	(Mexico) José Gutiérrez (Colombia) Gustavo Yacamán	Chevrolet 6.2 L V8	C	74	+1 lap
12	GTLM	911	(United States) Porsche North America	(France) Patrick Pilet (United Kingdom) Nick Tandy	Porsche 911 RSR	M	73	+1 lap
12	GTLM	911	(United States) Porsche North America	(France) Patrick Pilet (United Kingdom) Nick Tandy	Porsche 4.0 L Flat-6	M	73	+1 lap
13	GTLM	3	(United States) Corvette Racing	(Spain) Antonio García (Denmark) Jan Magnussen	Chevrolet Corvette C7.R	M	73	+1 lap
13	GTLM	3	(United States) Corvette Racing	(Spain) Antonio García (Denmark) Jan Magnussen	Chevrolet LT5.5 5.5 L V8	M	73	+1 lap
14	GTLM	25	(United States) BMW Team RLL	(United States) Bill Auberlen (Germany) Dirk Werner	BMW M6 GTLM	M	73	+2 Laps
14	GTLM	25	(United States) BMW Team RLL	(United States) Bill Auberlen (Germany) Dirk Werner	BMW 4.4 L Turbo V8	M	73	+2 Laps
15	GTLM	4	(United States) Corvette Racing	(United Kingdom) Oliver Gavin (United States) Tommy Milner	Chevrolet Corvette C7.R	M	73	+2 Laps
15	GTLM	4	(United States) Corvette Racing	(United Kingdom) Oliver Gavin (United States) Tommy Milner	Chevrolet LT5.5 5.5 L V8	M	73	+2 Laps
16	PC	85	(United States) JDC-Miller MotorSports	(Canada) Misha Goikhberg (South Africa) Stephen Simpson	Oreca FLM09	C	73	+2 Laps
16	PC	85	(United States) JDC-Miller MotorSports	(Canada) Misha Goikhberg (South Africa) Stephen Simpson	Chevrolet 6.2 L V8	C	73	+2 Laps
17	GTLM	66	(United States) Ford Chip Ganassi Racing	(Germany) Dirk Müller (United States) Joey Hand	Ford GT	M	73	+2 Laps
17	GTLM	66	(United States) Ford Chip Ganassi Racing	(Germany) Dirk Müller (United States) Joey Hand	Ford EcoBoost 3.5 L Twin-turbo V6	M	73	+2 Laps
18	GTLM	100	(United States) BMW Team RLL	(United States) John Edwards (Germany) Lucas Luhr	BMW M6 GTLM	M	73	+2 Laps
18	GTLM	100	(United States) BMW Team RLL	(United States) John Edwards (Germany) Lucas Luhr	BMW 4.4 L Turbo V8	M	73	+2 Laps
19	GTLM	62	(United States) Risi Competizione	(Finland) Toni Vilander (Italy) Giancarlo Fisichella	Ferrari 488 GTE	M	73	+2 Laps
19	GTLM	62	(United States) Risi Competizione	(Finland) Toni Vilander (Italy) Giancarlo Fisichella	Ferrari F154CB 3.9 L Turbo V8	M	73	+2 Laps
20	PC	26	(United States) BAR1 Motorsports	(United States) Don Yount (United States) John Falb	Oreca FLM09	C	73	+2 Laps
20	PC	26	(United States) BAR1 Motorsports	(United States) Don Yount (United States) John Falb	Chevrolet 6.2 L V8	C	73	+2 Laps
21	P	60	(United States) Michael Shank Racing with Curb-Agajanian	(United States) John Pew (Brazil) Oswaldo Negri Jr.	Ligier JS P2	C	72	+3 Laps
21	P	60	(United States) Michael Shank Racing with Curb-Agajanian	(United States) John Pew (Brazil) Oswaldo Negri Jr.	Honda HR35TT 3.5 Turbo V6	C	72	+3 Laps
**22**	**GTD**	**96**	**(United States) Turner Motorsport**	**(United States) Bret Curtis (Germany) Jens Klingmann**	**BMW M6 GT3**	C	**71**	**+4 Laps‡**
**22**	**GTD**	**96**	**(United States) Turner Motorsport**	**(United States) Bret Curtis (Germany) Jens Klingmann**	**BMW 4.4 L Turbo V8**	C	**71**	**+4 Laps‡**
23	GTD	48	(United States) Paul Miller Racing	(United States) Bryan Sellers (United States) Madison Snow	Lamborghini Huracán GT3	C	71	+4 Laps
23	GTD	48	(United States) Paul Miller Racing	(United States) Bryan Sellers (United States) Madison Snow	Lamborghini 5.2 L V10	C	71	+4 Laps
24	GTD	63	(United States) Scuderia Corsa	(Denmark) Christina Nielsen (Italy) Alessandro Balzan	Ferrari 488 GT3	C	71	+4 Laps
24	GTD	63	(United States) Scuderia Corsa	(Denmark) Christina Nielsen (Italy) Alessandro Balzan	Ferrari F154CB 3.9 L Turbo V8	C	71	+4 Laps
25	GTD	44	(United States) Magnus Racing	(United States) John Potter (United States) Andy Lally	Lamborghini Huracán GT3	C	71	+4 Laps
25	GTD	44	(United States) Magnus Racing	(United States) John Potter (United States) Andy Lally	Lamborghini 5.2 L V10	C	71	+4 Laps
26	GTD	73	(United States) Park Place Motorsports	(Germany) Jörg Bergmeister (United States) Patrick Lindsey	Porsche 911 GT3 R	C	71	+4 Laps
26	GTD	73	(United States) Park Place Motorsports	(Germany) Jörg Bergmeister (United States) Patrick Lindsey	Porsche 4.0 L Flat-6	C	71	+4 Laps
27	GTD	007	(United States) TRG-AMR	(United Kingdom) Ben Barker (Australia) David Calvert-Jones	Aston Martin Vantage GT3	C	71	+4 Laps
27	GTD	007	(United States) TRG-AMR	(United Kingdom) Ben Barker (Australia) David Calvert-Jones	Aston Martin 6.0 L V12	C	71	+4 Laps
28	GTD	23	(United States) Team Seattle/Alex Job Racing	(Germany) Mario Farnbacher (Spain) Alex Riberas	Porsche 911 GT3 R	C	70	+5 Laps
28	GTD	23	(United States) Team Seattle/Alex Job Racing	(Germany) Mario Farnbacher (Spain) Alex Riberas	Porsche 4.0 L Flat-6	C	70	+5 Laps
29	GTD	80	(United States) Lone Star Racing	(United States) Dan Knox (United States) Mike Skeen	Dodge Viper GT3-R	C	70	+5 Laps
29	GTD	80	(United States) Lone Star Racing	(United States) Dan Knox (United States) Mike Skeen	Dodge 8.3L V10	C	70	+5 Laps
30	GTD	16	(United States) Change Racing	(United States) Corey Lewis (United States) Spencer Pumpelly	Lamborghini Huracán GT3	C	70	+5 Laps
30	GTD	16	(United States) Change Racing	(United States) Corey Lewis (United States) Spencer Pumpelly	Lamborghini 5.2 L V10	C	70	+5 Laps
31	GTD	6	(United States) Stevenson Motorsports	(United States) Andrew Davis (United Kingdom) Robin Liddell	Audi R8 LMS	C	70	+5 Laps
31	GTD	6	(United States) Stevenson Motorsports	(United States) Andrew Davis (United Kingdom) Robin Liddell	Audi 5.2L V10	C	70	+5 Laps
32	GTD	27	(United States) Stevenson Motorsports	(Italy) Luca Persiani (Italy) Paolo Ruberti	Audi R8 LMS	C	70	+5 Laps
32	GTD	27	(United States) Stevenson Motorsports	(Italy) Luca Persiani (Italy) Paolo Ruberti	Audi 5.2L V10	C	70	+5 Laps
33	GTD	9	(United States) Stevenson Motorsports	(United States) Lawson Aschenbach (United States) Matt Bell	Audi R8 LMS	C	70	+5 Laps
33	GTD	9	(United States) Stevenson Motorsports	(United States) Lawson Aschenbach (United States) Matt Bell	Audi 5.2L V10	C	70	+5 Laps
34	GTD	33	(United States) Riley Motorsports	(Netherlands) Jeroen Bleekemolen (United States) Ben Keating	Dodge Viper GT3-R	C	67	+8 Laps
34	GTD	33	(United States) Riley Motorsports	(Netherlands) Jeroen Bleekemolen (United States) Ben Keating	Dodge 8.3L V10	C	67	+8 Laps
35	PC	88	(United States) Starworks Motorsport	(United States) Mark Kvamme (United Kingdom) Richard Bradley	Oreca FLM09	C	65	+10 Laps
35	PC	88	(United States) Starworks Motorsport	(United States) Mark Kvamme (United Kingdom) Richard Bradley	Chevrolet 6.2 L V8	C	65	+10 Laps
36	GTLM	67	(United States) Ford Chip Ganassi Racing	(Australia) Ryan Briscoe (United Kingdom) Richard Westbrook	Ford GT	M	58	+17 Laps
36	GTLM	67	(United States) Ford Chip Ganassi Racing	(Australia) Ryan Briscoe (United Kingdom) Richard Westbrook	Ford EcoBoost 3.5 L Twin-turbo V6	M	58	+17 Laps
37	GTD	97	(United States) Turner Motorsport	(United States) Michael Marsal (Finland) Markus Palttala	BMW M6 GT3	C	58	+17 Laps
37	GTD	97	(United States) Turner Motorsport	(United States) Michael Marsal (Finland) Markus Palttala	BMW 4.4 L Turbo V8	C	58	+17 Laps
38	P	90	(United States) VisitFlorida Racing	(Belgium) Marc Goossens (United Kingdom) Ryan Dalziel	Corvette Daytona Prototype	C	39	+36 Laps
38	P	90	(United States) VisitFlorida Racing	(Belgium) Marc Goossens (United Kingdom) Ryan Dalziel	Chevrolet 5.5 L V8	C	39	+36 Laps
39	P	55	(Japan) Mazda Motorsports	(United States) Jonathan Bomarito (United States) Tristan Nunez	Mazda Prototype	C	35	Did Not Finish
39	P	55	(Japan) Mazda Motorsports	(United States) Jonathan Bomarito (United States) Tristan Nunez	Mazda MZ-2.0T 2.0 L I4 Turbo	C	35	Did Not Finish

Tyre manufacturers
Key
Symbol	Tyre manufacturer
**C**	Continental
**M**	Michelin

== Championship standings after the race ==
Prototype Drivers' Championship standings
Pos.	+/–	Driver	Points
1	1	(United States) Eric Curran (United States) Dane Cameron	285
2	1	(Portugal) João Barbosa (Brazil) Christian Fittipaldi	284
3		(United States) Jordan Taylor (United States) Ricky Taylor	278
4		(Belgium) Marc Goossens	248
5		(Brazil) Oswaldo Negri Jr.	246

PC Drivers' Championship standings
Pos.	+/–	Driver	Points
1		(Venezuela) Alex Popow (Netherlands) Renger van der Zande	329
2		(United States) Robert Alon (United Kingdom) Tom Kimber-Smith	319
3		(South Africa) Stephen Simpson (Canada) Misha Goikhberg	286
4	1	(United States) James French	272
5	1	(United States) Jon Bennett (United States) Colin Braun	245

GTLM Drivers' Championship standings
Pos.	+/–	Driver	Points
1		(United Kingdom) Oliver Gavin (United States) Tommy Milner	314
2		(Australia) Ryan Briscoe (United Kingdom) Richard Westbrook	303
3		(Spain) Antonio García (Denmark) Jan Magnussen	290
4		(New Zealand) Earl Bamber (France) Frédéric Makowiecki	286
5		(United States) Bill Auberlen (Germany) Dirk Werner	275

GTD Drivers' Championship standings
Pos.	+/–	Driver	Points
1		(Italy) Alessandro Balzan (Denmark) Christina Nielsen	299
2		(Netherlands) Jeroen Bleekemolen (United States) Ben Keating	267
3		(United States) Andrew Davis (United Kingdom) Robin Liddell	265
4	1	(United States) Bryan Sellers (United States) Madison Snow	264
5	1	(Germany) Mario Farnbacher (Spain) Alex Riberas	261

- Note: Only the top five positions are included for all sets of standings.

Prototype Teams' Championship standings
Pos.	+/–	Team	Points
1	1	(United States) No. 31 Action Express Racing	285
2	1	(United States) No. 5 Action Express Racing	284
3		(United States) No. 10 Wayne Taylor Racing	278
4		(United States) No. 90 VisitFlorida Racing	248
5		(United States) No. 60 Michael Shank Racing with Curb-Agajanian	246

PC Teams' Championship standings
Pos.	+/–	Team	Points
1		(United States) No. 8 Starworks Motorsport	329
2		(United States) No. 52 PR1/Mathiasen Motorsports	319
3	2	(United States) No. 38 Performance Tech Motorsports	297
4		(United States) No. 85 JDC-Miller MotorSports	286
5	1	(United States) No. 20 BAR1 Motorsports	275

GTLM Teams' Championship standings
Pos.	+/–	Team	Points
1		(United States) No. 4 Corvette Racing	314
2		(United States) No. 67 Ford Chip Ganassi Racing	303
3		(United States) No. 3 Corvette Racing	290
4		(United States) No. 912 Porsche North America	286
5		(United States) No. 25 BMW Team RLL	275

GTD Teams' Championship standings
Pos.	+/–	Team	Points
1		(United States) No. 63 Scuderia Corsa	299
2		(United States) No. 33 Riley Motorsports	267
3		(United States) No. 6 Stevenson Motorsports	265
4	1	(United States) No. 48 Paul Miller Racing	264
5	1	(United States) No. 23 Team Seattle/Alex Job Racing	261

- Note: Only the top five positions are included for all sets of standings.

Prototype Manufacturers' Championship standings
Pos.	+/–	Manufacturer	Points
1		(United States) Chevrolet	306
2		(Japan) Honda	289
3		(Japan) Mazda	274
4		(Germany) BMW	56
5		(United States) Ford	30

GTLM Manufacturers' Championship standings
Pos.	+/–	Manufacturer	Points
1		(United States) Chevrolet	329
2		(United States) Ford	309
3		(Germany) Porsche	302
4		(Germany) BMW	288
5		(Italy) Ferrari	282

GTD Manufacturers' Championship standings
Pos.	+/–	Manufacturer	Points
1		(Germany) Audi	308
2		(Germany) Porsche	297
3		(Italy) Ferrari	296
4		(United States) Dodge	286
5		(Germany) BMW	283

- Note: Only the top five positions are included for all sets of standings.

IMSA SportsCar Championship
Previous race: Oak Tree Grand Prix	2016 season	Next race: Petit Star Le Mans
