= 2016 Chevrolet Sports Car Classic =

Fifth round of the 2016 IMSA SportsCar Championship season

The layout of The Raceway on Belle Isle

The 2016 Chevrolet Sports Car Classic was a sports car race sanctioned by the International Motor Sports Association (IMSA). The race was held at The Raceway on Belle Isle in Detroit, Michigan on June 4, 2016. The race was the fifth round of the 2016 IMSA SportsCar Championship.

== Background ==
=== Preview ===
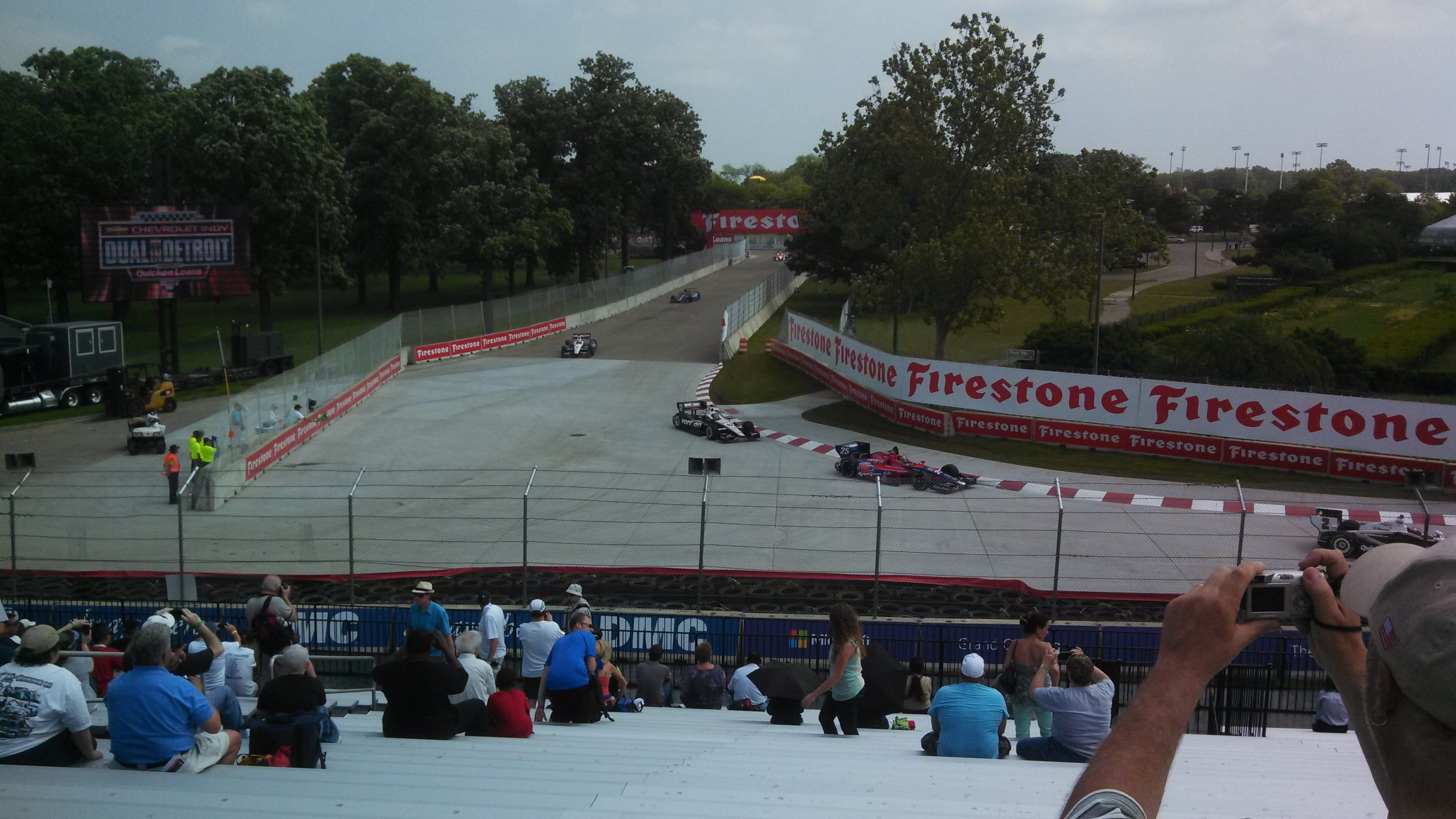
The Raceway on Belle Isle, where the race was held.

Similar to the Grand Prix of Long Beach, this event was held in conjunction with the Detroit Grand Prix in the IndyCar series, with one event held on the same day as the IMSA event, and another held a day after as a double-header.

International Motor Sports Association (IMSA) president Scott Atherton confirmed the race was part of the schedule for the 2016 IMSA SportsCar Championship (IMSA SCC) in August 2015. It was the third consecutive year the event was held as part of the WeatherTech SportsCar Championship, and the seventh annual running of the race, counting the period between 2007 and 2013 when it was a round of the Rolex Sports Car Series and the American Le Mans Series respectively. The 2016 Chevrolet Sports Car Classic was the fifth of twelve scheduled sports car races of 2016 by IMSA, the shortest in terms of time, and was the third round not held on the held as part of the North American Endurance Cup. The race was held at the fourteen-turn 2.350 mi (3.782 km) Belle Isle Park on June 4, 2016.

IMSA altered the balance of performance to try to create parity within the Prototype category. The Lola B12/80 had its weight increased by 15 kg (33 lb).

Before the race, Eric Curran and Dane Cameron led the Prototype Drivers' Championship with 121 points, ahead of João Barbosa and Christian Fittipaldi with 118 points, and Marc Goossens in third with 117 points. With 128 points, PC was led by Misha Goikhberg and Stephen Simpson on countback over Robert Alon and Tom Kimber-Smith. In GTD, the Drivers' Championship was led by Alessandro Balzan and Christina Nielsen with 95 points; the duo held a six-point advantage over Mario Farnbacher and Alex Riberas. Honda and Porsche were leading their respective Manufacturers' Championships, while Action Express Racing, JDC-Miller MotorSports, and Scuderia Corsa each led their own Teams' Championships.

=== Entry list ===
Twenty-seven cars were officially entered for the Chevrolet Sports Car Classic, with most of the entries being in the Grand Touring Daytona (GTD) category. Action Express Racing (AER) fielded two Chevrolet Corvette DP cars while VisitFlorida Racing (VFR) and WTR fielded one. Mazda Motorsports had two Lola B12/80 cars and Michael Shank Racing (MSR) entered one Ligier JS P2. Panoz skipped the event. The Prototype Challenge (PC) class was composed of seven Oreca FLM09 cars: two from Starworks Motorsports. BAR1 Motorsports, CORE Autosport, JDC-Miller MotorSports, Performance Tech and PR1/Mathiasen Motorsports entered one car each. In the list of GTD entrants, twelve GT3-specification vehicles were represented by six different manufacturers. Lone Star Racing and TRG skipped the event. With the absence of the Grand Touring Le Mans (GTLM) class from the field, only three racing classes were represented in Belle Isle.

== Practice ==
There were two practice sessions preceding the start of the race on Saturday, two on Friday. The first ninety-minute session was on Friday morning. The second on Friday afternoon lasted 90 minutes.

In the first session, Barbosa set the fastest time in the No. 5 AER Corvette DP with a time of 1 minute, 24.239 seconds, 0.732 seconds faster than Cameron's No. 5 car. Jordan Taylor was third fastest in the No. 10 WTR vehicle, Oswaldo Negri Jr.'s No. 60 MSR Ligier placed fourth, and Ryan Dalziel's No. 90 Corvette DP rounded out the top five. The fastest PC class car was Renger van der Zande in the No. 8 Starworks entry with 1 minute, 27.030 seconds, followed by Colin Braun in the No. 54 CORE Autosport car. Porsche paced GTD with PPM's 911 of Bergmeister lapping at 1:31.253, followed by Jeroen Bleekemolen's No. 33 Viper.

Cameron led the final session in AER's No. 31 car with a lap of 1 minute, 23.860 seconds. Fittipaldi's No.5 Corvette DP was second fastest. Goossens in the No. 90 VFR vehicle was third fastest. CORE Autosport topped PC after a lap by Braun. Mowlem caused a stoppage early when his BAR1 car suffered a suspension failure and stopped on the track. Bergmeister was fastest again GTD.

== Qualifying ==
Friday afternoon's 60-minute three-group qualifying session gave 15-minute sessions to all categories. Cars in GTD were sent out first before those grouped in PC, and Prototype had two separate identically timed sessions. Regulations stipulated teams to nominate one qualifying driver, with the fastest laps determining each classes starting order. IMSA would arranged the grid to put all Prototypes ahead of the PC, and GTD cars.

=== Qualifying results ===
Pole positions in each class are indicated in bold and by ‡.

| Pos. | Class | No. | Team | Driver | Time | Gap | Grid |
|---|---|---|---|---|---|---|---|
| 1 | **P** | **5** | **(United States) Action Express Racing** | **(Brazil) Christian Fittipaldi** | **1:23.815** | — | 1‡ |
| 2 | P | 90 | (United States) VisitFlorida Racing | (Belgium) Marc Goossens | 1:23.863 | +0.048 | 2 |
| 3 | P | 10 | (United States) Wayne Taylor Racing | (United States) Ricky Taylor | 1:24.253 | +0.438 | 3 |
| 4 | P | 31 | (United States) Action Express Racing | (United States) Eric Curran | 1:24.337 | +1.380 | 4 |
| 5 | P | 60 | (United States) Michael Shank Racing with Curb-Agajanian | (United Kingdom) Katherine Legge | 1:25.195 | +1.550 | 5 |
| 6 | P | 55 | (Japan) Mazda Motorsports | (United States) Tristan Nunez | 1:25.365 | +1.934 | 6 |
| 7 | P | 70 | (Japan) Mazda Motorsports | (United States) Tom Long | 1:25.749 | +3.756 | 7 |
| 8 | **PC** | **52** | **(United States) PR1/Mathiasen Motorsports** | **(United States) Robert Alon** | **1:27.571** | **+3.756** | 8‡ |
| 9 | PC | 38 | (United States) Performance Tech Motorsports | (United States) James French | 1:27.851 | +4.036 | 9 |
| 10 | PC | 8 | (United States) Starworks Motorsport | (Venezuela) Alex Popow | 1:27.878 | +4.063 | 10 |
| 11 | PC | 85 | (United States) JDC-Miller MotorSports | (Canada) Misha Goikhberg | 1:28.005 | +4.190 | 27^{1} |
| 12 | PC | 54 | (United States) CORE Autosport | (United States) Jon Bennett | 1:28.903 | +5.088 | 11 |
| 13 | **GTD** | **48** | **(United States) Paul Miller Racing** | **(United States) Bryan Sellers** | **1:31.340** | **+7.525** | 14‡ |
| 14 | GTD | 73 | (United States) Park Place Motorsports | (United States) Patrick Lindsey | 1:31.637 | +7.536 | 15 |
| 15 | GTD | 6 | (United States) Stevenson Motorsports | (United Kingdom) Robin Liddell | 1:31.637 | +7.822 | 16 |
| 16 | GTD | 16 | (United States) Change Racing | (United States) Spencer Pumpelly | 1:31.917 | +8.102 | 17 |
| 17 | GTD | 9 | (United States) Stevenson Motorsports | (United States) Matt Bell | 1:32.017 | +8.202 | 18 |
| 18 | GTD | 33 | (United States) Riley Motorsports | (United States) Ben Keating | 1:32.073 | +8.258 | 19 |
| 19 | GTD | 27 | (United States) Dream Racing | (Monaco) Cédric Sbirrazzuoli | 1:32.106 | +8.291 | 25^{2} |
| 20 | GTD | 63 | (United States) Scuderia Corsa | (Denmark) Christina Nielsen | 1:32.275 | +8.460 | 20 |
| 21 | GTD | 22 | (United States) Alex Job Racing | (United States) Cooper MacNeil | 1:32.673 | +8.858 | 21 |
| 22 | GTD | 97 | (United States) Turner Motorsport | (United States) Michael Marsa | 1:33.073 | +9.258 | 22 |
| 23 | GTD | 23 | (United States) Team Seattle/Alex Job Racing | (Germany) Mario Farnbacher | 1:33.200 | +9.385 | 23 |
| 24 | GTD | 96 | (United States) Turner Motorsport | (United States) Bret Curtis | 1:33.266 | +9.451 | 24 |
| 25 | GTD | 44 | (United States) Magnus Racing | (United States) John Potter | 1:34.020 | +10.205 | 26^{3} |
| 26 | PC | 20 | (United States) BAR1 Motorsports | (United States) Tomy Drissi | 1:34.081 | +10.266 | 12 |
| 27 | PC | 88 | (United States) Starworks Motorsport | (United States) Mark Kvamme | 1:35.857 | +12.042 | 13^{3} |
Sources:

- ^{1} The No. 85 JDC-Miller MotorSports was sent to the rear of the PC grid for not starting on the grid.
- ^{2} The No. 27 Dream Racing Lamborghini was sent to the rear of the GTD grid as per 43.1 of the Sporting regulations (Starting driver change).
- ^{3} The No. 44 Magnus Racing, and No. 88 Starworks Motorsport entries were sent to the rear of their respective class fields as per 40.1.5 of the Sporting regulations (Tire change).

== Race ==
=== Post-race ===
With a total of 151 points, Ricky Taylor and Jordan Taylor's victory allowed them to take the lead of the Prototype Drivers' Championship. Bomarito and Nunez advanced from sixth to fifth. Popow and van der Zande's victory allowed them to take the lead of the Prototype Challenge Drivers' Championship with 162 points. The final results of GTD meant Balzan and Nielsen extended their advantage in the GTD Drivers' Championship to eight points over Farnbacher and Riberas. Bleekemolen and Keating jumped from seventh to fourth. Porsche continued to top the GTD Manufactures' Championship while Chevrolet took the lead of the Prototype Manufactures' Championship. Scuderia Corsa continued to the GTD Teams' Championship while Wayne Taylor Racing and Starworks Motorsport became the leaders of their respective Teams' Championships with seven rounds left in the season.

=== Race results ===
Class winners are denoted in bold and ‡. P stands for Prototype, PC (Prototype Challenge), and GTD (Grand Touring Daytona).

Final race classification
| Pos | Class | No. | Team | Drivers | Chassis | Tire | Laps | Time/Retired |
| Pos | Class | No. | Team | Drivers | Engine | Tire | Laps | Time/Retired |
|---|---|---|---|---|---|---|---|---|
| 1 | **P** | **10** | **(United States) Wayne Taylor Racing** | **(United States) Jordan Taylor (United States) Ricky Taylor** | **Corvette Daytona Prototype** | C | **57** | **01:40:11.998‡** |
| 1 | **P** | **10** | **(United States) Wayne Taylor Racing** | **(United States) Jordan Taylor (United States) Ricky Taylor** | **Chevrolet 5.5 L V8** | C | **57** | **01:40:11.998‡** |
| 2 | P | 5 | (United States) Action Express Racing | (Portugal) João Barbosa (Brazil) Christian Fittipaldi | Corvette Daytona Prototype | C | 57 | +1.740 |
| 2 | P | 5 | (United States) Action Express Racing | (Portugal) João Barbosa (Brazil) Christian Fittipaldi | Chevrolet 5.5 L V8 | C | 57 | +1.740 |
| 3 | **PC** | **8** | **(United States) Starworks Motorsport** | **(Venezuela) Alex Popow (Netherlands) Renger van der Zande** | **Oreca FLM09** | C | **57** | **+33.643‡** |
| 3 | **PC** | **8** | **(United States) Starworks Motorsport** | **(Venezuela) Alex Popow (Netherlands) Renger van der Zande** | **Chevrolet 6.2 L V8** | C | **57** | **+33.643‡** |
| 4 | PC | 54 | (United States) CORE Autosport | (United States) Jon Bennett (United States) Colin Braun | Oreca FLM09 | C | 57 | +37.117 |
| 4 | PC | 54 | (United States) CORE Autosport | (United States) Jon Bennett (United States) Colin Braun | Chevrolet 6.2 L V8 | C | 57 | +37.117 |
| 5 | PC | 52 | (United States) PR1/Mathiasen Motorsports | (United States) Robert Alon (United Kingdom) Tom Kimber-Smith | Oreca FLM09 | C | 57 | +48.082 |
| 5 | PC | 52 | (United States) PR1/Mathiasen Motorsports | (United States) Robert Alon (United Kingdom) Tom Kimber-Smith | Chevrolet 6.2 L V8 | C | 57 | +48.082 |
| 6 | PC | 38 | (United States) Performance Tech Motorsports | (United States) James French (Canada) Kyle Marcelli | Oreca FLM09 | C | 57 | +51.278 |
| 6 | PC | 38 | (United States) Performance Tech Motorsports | (United States) James French (Canada) Kyle Marcelli | Chevrolet 6.2 L V8 | C | 57 | +51.278 |
| 7 | P | 55 | (Japan) Mazda Motorsports | (United States) Jonathan Bomarito (United States) Tristan Nunez | Mazda Prototype | C | 57 | +1:00.977 |
| 7 | P | 55 | (Japan) Mazda Motorsports | (United States) Jonathan Bomarito (United States) Tristan Nunez | Mazda MZ-2.0T 2.0 L I4 Turbo | C | 57 | +1:00.977 |
| 8 | PC | 20 | (United States) BAR1 Motorsports | (United States) Tomy Drissi (United Kingdom) Johnny Mowlem | Oreca FLM09 | C | 57 | +1:01.468 |
| 8 | PC | 20 | (United States) BAR1 Motorsports | (United States) Tomy Drissi (United Kingdom) Johnny Mowlem | Chevrolet 6.2 L V8 | C | 57 | +1:01.468 |
| 9 | P | 70 | (Japan) Mazda Motorsports | (United States) Tom Long (United States) Joel Miller | Mazda Prototype | C | 56 | +1 Lap |
| 9 | P | 70 | (Japan) Mazda Motorsports | (United States) Tom Long (United States) Joel Miller | Mazda MZ-2.0T 2.0 L I4 Turbo | C | 56 | +1 Lap |
| 10 | **GTD** | **33** | **(United States) Riley Motorsports** | **(Netherlands) Jeroen Bleekemolen (United States) Ben Keating** | **Dodge Viper GT3-R** | C | **56** | **+1 Lap‡** |
| 10 | **GTD** | **33** | **(United States) Riley Motorsports** | **(Netherlands) Jeroen Bleekemolen (United States) Ben Keating** | **Dodge 8.3L V10** | C | **56** | **+1 Lap‡** |
| 11 | GTD | 73 | (United States) Park Place Motorsports | (Germany) Jörg Bergmeister (United States) Patrick Lindsey | Porsche 911 GT3 R | C | 56 | +1 Lap |
| 11 | GTD | 73 | (United States) Park Place Motorsports | (Germany) Jörg Bergmeister (United States) Patrick Lindsey | Porsche 4.0 L Flat-6 | C | 56 | +1 Lap |
| 12 | GTD | 63 | (United States) Scuderia Corsa | (Denmark) Christina Nielsen (Italy) Alessandro Balzan | Ferrari 488 GT3 | C | 56 | +1 Lap |
| 12 | GTD | 63 | (United States) Scuderia Corsa | (Denmark) Christina Nielsen (Italy) Alessandro Balzan | Ferrari F154CB 3.9 L Turbo V8 | C | 56 | +1 Lap |
| 13 | GTD | 23 | (United States) Team Seattle/Alex Job Racing | (Germany) Mario Farnbacher (Spain) Alex Riberas | Porsche 911 GT3 R | C | 56 | +1 Lap |
| 13 | GTD | 23 | (United States) Team Seattle/Alex Job Racing | (Germany) Mario Farnbacher (Spain) Alex Riberas | Porsche 4.0 L Flat-6 | C | 56 | +1 Lap |
| 14 | GTD | 6 | (United States) Stevenson Motorsports | (United States) Andrew Davis (United Kingdom) Robin Liddell | Audi R8 LMS | C | 56 | +1 Lap |
| 14 | GTD | 6 | (United States) Stevenson Motorsports | (United States) Andrew Davis (United Kingdom) Robin Liddell | Audi 5.2L V10 | C | 56 | +1 Lap |
| 15 | GTD | 16 | (United States) Change Racing | (United States) Corey Lewis (United States) Spencer Pumpelly | Lamborghini Huracán GT3 | C | 56 | +1 Lap |
| 15 | GTD | 16 | (United States) Change Racing | (United States) Corey Lewis (United States) Spencer Pumpelly | Lamborghini 5.2 L V10 | C | 56 | +1 Lap |
| 16 | GTD | 22 | (United States) Alex Job Racing | (United States) Cooper MacNeil (United States) Leh Keen | Porsche 911 GT3 R | C | 56 | +1 Lap |
| 16 | GTD | 22 | (United States) Alex Job Racing | (United States) Cooper MacNeil (United States) Leh Keen | Porsche 4.0 L Flat-6 | C | 56 | +1 Lap |
| 17 | GTD | 48 | (United States) Paul Miller Racing | (United States) Bryan Sellers (United States) Madison Snow | Lamborghini Huracán GT3 | C | 56 | +1 Lap |
| 17 | GTD | 48 | (United States) Paul Miller Racing | (United States) Bryan Sellers (United States) Madison Snow | Lamborghini 5.2 L V10 | C | 56 | +1 Lap |
| 18 | GTD | 96 | (United States) Turner Motorsport | (United States) Bret Curtis (Germany) Jens Klingmann | BMW M6 GT3 | C | 56 | +1 Lap |
| 18 | GTD | 96 | (United States) Turner Motorsport | (United States) Bret Curtis (Germany) Jens Klingmann | BMW 4.4L Turbo V8 | C | 56 | +1 Lap |
| 19 | GTD | 44 | (United States) Magnus Racing | (United States) John Potter (United States) Andy Lally | Audi R8 LMS | C | 56 | +1 Lap |
| 19 | GTD | 44 | (United States) Magnus Racing | (United States) John Potter (United States) Andy Lally | Audi 5.2L V10 | C | 56 | +1 Lap |
| 20 | GTD | 97 | (United States) Turner Motorsport | (United States) Michael Marsal (Finland) Markus Palttala | BMW M6 GT3 | C | 56 | +1 Lap |
| 20 | GTD | 97 | (United States) Turner Motorsport | (United States) Michael Marsal (Finland) Markus Palttala | BMW 4.4L Turbo V8 | C | 56 | +1 Lap |
| 21 | GTD | 27 | (United States) Dream Racing | (Monaco) Cédric Sbirrazzuoli (United States) Lawrence DeGeorge | Lamborghini Huracán GT3 | C | 56 | +1 Lap |
| 21 | GTD | 27 | (United States) Dream Racing | (Monaco) Cédric Sbirrazzuoli (United States) Lawrence DeGeorge | Lamborghini 5.2 L V10 | C | 56 | +1 Lap |
| 22 | P | 60 | (United States) Michael Shank Racing with Curb-Agajanian | (Brazil) Oswaldo Negri Jr. (United Kingdom) Katherine Legge | Ligier JS P2 | C | 54 | +3 Laps |
| 22 | P | 60 | (United States) Michael Shank Racing with Curb-Agajanian | (Brazil) Oswaldo Negri Jr. (United Kingdom) Katherine Legge | Honda HR35TT 3.5 Turbo V6 | C | 54 | +3 Laps |
| 23 | P | 31 | (United States) Action Express Racing | (United States) Eric Curran (United States) Dane Cameron | Corvette Daytona Prototype | C | 40 | +17 Laps |
| 23 | P | 31 | (United States) Action Express Racing | (United States) Eric Curran (United States) Dane Cameron | Chevrolet 5.5 L V8 | C | 40 | +17 Laps |
| 24 DNF | PC | 88 | (United States) Starworks Motorsport | (United States) Mark Kvamme (United States) Ashley Freiberg | Oreca FLM09 | C | 29 | Crash |
| 24 DNF | PC | 88 | (United States) Starworks Motorsport | (United States) Mark Kvamme (United States) Ashley Freiberg | Chevrolet 6.2 L V8 | C | 29 | Crash |
| 25 | GTD | 9 | (United States) Stevenson Motorsports | (United States) Lawson Aschenbach (United States) Matt Bell | Audi R8 LMS | C | 25 | +32 Laps |
| 25 | GTD | 9 | (United States) Stevenson Motorsports | (United States) Lawson Aschenbach (United States) Matt Bell | Audi 5.2L V10 | C | 25 | +32 Laps |
| 26 DNF | PC | 85 | (United States) JDC-Miller MotorSports | (Canada) Misha Goikhberg (South Africa) Stephen Simpson | Oreca FLM09 | C | 18 | Withdrew |
| 26 DNF | PC | 85 | (United States) JDC-Miller MotorSports | (Canada) Misha Goikhberg (South Africa) Stephen Simpson | Chevrolet 6.2 L V8 | C | 18 | Withdrew |
| 27 DNF | P | 90 | (United States) VisitFlorida Racing | (Belgium) Marc Goossens (United Kingdom) Ryan Dalziel | Corvette Daytona Prototype | C | 9 | Crash |
| 27 DNF | P | 90 | (United States) VisitFlorida Racing | (Belgium) Marc Goossens (United Kingdom) Ryan Dalziel | Chevrolet 5.5 L V8 | C | 9 | Crash |

Tyre manufacturer
Key
| Symbol | Tyre manufacturer |
|---|---|
| **C** | Continental |

== Championship standings after the race ==
Prototype Drivers' Championship standings
| Pos. | +/– | Driver | Points |
|---|---|---|---|
| 1 | 3 | (United States) Jordan Taylor (United States) Ricky Taylor | 151 |
| 2 | | (Portugal) João Barbosa (Brazil) Christian Fittipaldi | 151 |
| 3 | 2 | (United States) Eric Curran (United States) Dane Cameron | 147 |
| 4 | 1 | (Belgium) Marc Goossens | 142 |
| 5 | 1 | (United States) Jonathan Bomarito (United States) Tristan Nunez | 135 |

PC Drivers' Championship standings
| Pos. | +/– | Driver | Points |
|---|---|---|---|
| 1 | 2 | (Venezuela) Alex Popow (Netherlands) Renger van der Zande | 162 |
| 2 | | (United States) Robert Alon (United Kingdom) Tom Kimber-Smith | 159 |
| 3 | 2 | (South Africa) Stephen Simpson (Canada) Misha Goikhberg | 153 |
| 4 | | (United Kingdom) Johnny Mowlem | 139 |
| 5 | | (United States) Jon Bennett (United States) Colin Braun | 126 |

GTLM Drivers' Championship standings
| Pos. | +/– | Driver | Points |
|---|---|---|---|
| 1 | | (United Kingdom) Oliver Gavin (United States) Tommy Milner | 130 |
| 2 | | (New Zealand) Earl Bamber (France) Frédéric Makowiecki | 118 |
| 3 | | (Australia) Ryan Briscoe (United Kingdom) Richard Westbrook | 115 |
| 4 | | (Brazil) Daniel Serra | 113 |
| 5 | | (Italy) Giancarlo Fisichella (Finland) Toni Vilander | 113 |

GTD Drivers' Championship standings
| Pos. | +/– | Driver | Points |
|---|---|---|---|
| 1 | | (Italy) Alessandro Balzan (Denmark) Christina Nielsen | 126 |
| 2 | | (Germany) Mario Farnbacher (Spain) Alex Riberas | 118 |
| 3 | | (United States) Andy Lally (United States) John Potter | 108 |
| 4 | 4 | (Netherlands) Jeroen Bleekemolen (United States) Ben Keating | 105 |
| 5 | | (United States) Andrew Davis (United Kingdom) Robin Liddell | 98 |

- Note: Only the top five positions are included for all sets of standings.

Prototype Teams' Championship standings
| Pos. | +/– | Team | Points |
|---|---|---|---|
| 1 | 3 | (United States) No. 10 Wayne Taylor Racing | 151 |
| 2 | 1 | (United States) No. 5 Action Express Racing | 151 |
| 3 | 2 | (United States) No. 31 Action Express Racing | 147 |
| 4 | 1 | (United States) No. 90 VisitFlorida Racing | 142 |
| 5 | 1 | (Japan) No. 55 Mazda Motorsports | 135 |

PC Teams' Championship standings
| Pos. | +/– | Team | Points |
|---|---|---|---|
| 1 | 2 | (United States) No. 8 Starworks Motorsport | 162 |
| 2 | | (United States) No. 52 PR1/Mathiasen Motorsports | 159 |
| 3 | 2 | (United States) No. 85 JDC-Miller MotorSports | 153 |
| 4 | | (United States) No. 54 CORE Autosport | 149 |
| 5 | | (United States) No. 38 Performance Tech Motorsports | 142 |

GTLM Teams' Championship standings
| Pos. | +/– | Team | Points |
|---|---|---|---|
| 1 | | (United States) No. 4 Corvette Racing | 130 |
| 2 | | (United States) No. 912 Porsche North America | 118 |
| 3 | | (United States) No. 67 Ford Chip Ganassi Racing | 115 |
| 4 | | (United States) No. 68 Scuderia Corsa | 113 |
| 5 | | (United States) No. 62 Risi Competizione | 113 |

GTD Teams' Championship standings
| Pos. | +/– | Team | Points |
|---|---|---|---|
| 1 | | (United States) No. 63 Scuderia Corsa | 126 |
| 2 | | (United States) No. 23 Team Seattle/Alex Job Racing | 118 |
| 3 | | (United States) No. 44 Magnus Racing | 108 |
| 4 | 1 | (United States) No. 33 Riley Motorsports | 105 |
| 5 | | (United States) No. 6 Stevenson Motorsports | 98 |

- Note: Only the top five positions are included for all sets of standings.

Prototype Manufacturers' Championship standings
| Pos. | +/– | Manufacturer | Points |
|---|---|---|---|
| 1 | 1 | (United States) Chevrolet | 166 |
| 2 | 1 | (Japan) Honda | 155 |
| 3 | | (Japan) Mazda | 150 |
| 4 | | (Germany) BMW | 56 |
| 5 | | (United States) Ford | 30 |

GTLM Manufacturers' Championship standings
| Pos. | +/– | Manufacturer | Points |
|---|---|---|---|
| 1 | | (United States) Chevrolet | 130 |
| 2 | | (Germany) Porsche | 127 |
| 3 | | (Italy) Ferrari | 120 |
| 4 | | (United States) Ford | 115 |
| 5 | | (Germany) BMW | 112 |

GTD Manufacturers' Championship standings
| Pos. | +/– | Manufacturer | Points |
|---|---|---|---|
| 1 | | (Germany) Porsche | 127 |
| 2 | 1 | (Italy) Ferrari | 122 |
| 3 | 1 | (Germany) Audi | 121 |
| 4 | 2 | (United States) Dodge | 114 |
| 5 | 1 | (Germany) BMW | 109 |

- Note: Only the top five positions are included for all sets of standings.

IMSA SportsCar Championship
| Previous race: Monterey Grand Prix | 2016 season | Next race: 6 Hours of The Glen |
