= Alex Riberas =

Spanish racing driver

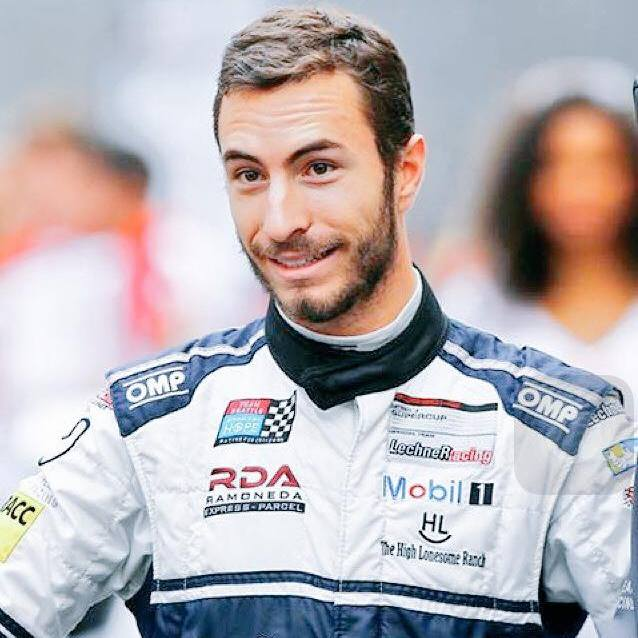
- Riberas at Circuit de Monaco in 2015.
- Nationality: (Spain) Spanish
- Born: Alex Riberas Bou; 27 January 1994 (age 32) Barcelona (Spain)

FIA World Endurance Championship career
- Debut season: 2023
- Current team: Aston Martin THOR Team
- Categorisation: FIA Silver (2014, 2016); FIA Gold (2015, 2017–)
- Car number: 009
- Starts: 15 (15 entries)
- Wins: 1
- Podiums: 4
- Poles: 1
- Fastest laps: 0
- Best finish: 5th in 2023 (LMGT3)

Previous series
- 2024 2018, 2021–22: Intercontinental GT Challenge; 24H GT Series

Alex Riberas Bou (born 27 January 1994) is a Spanish racing driver. He currently competes in the FIA World Endurance Championship and the IMSA Sportscar Championship for Aston Martin THOR Team.

== Career ==
=== Karting ===
Riberas began karting in Spain in 2007. He became a member of the junior program for Circuit de Barcelona-Catalunya in 2009. Riberas had moderate success in karting, gaining some race victories.

=== Single-seaters ===
==== Formula Renault 2.0 ====
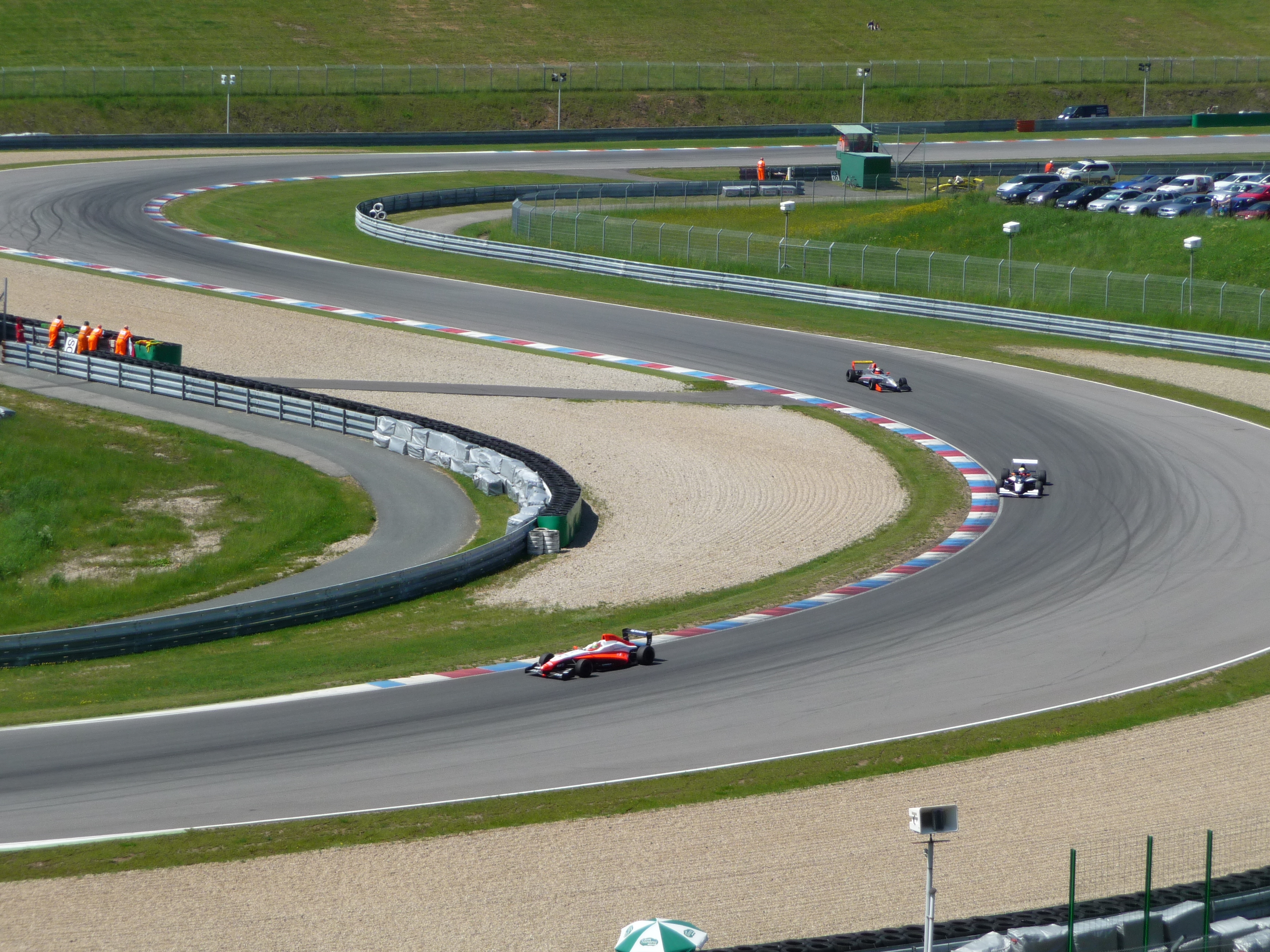
Riberas (2nd car) competing at the Hungaroring in 2010.

Riberas made his debut in the Eurocup Formula Renault 2.0 championship in 2010, where he finished eighth in the championship. Riberas competed in the series in 2011 and 2012 as well, with a best championship finish of sixth in 2011 and earning a race victory in 2011.

Riberas also made one-off appearances in the Formula Renault 2.0 UK series in 2010, the Formula Renault 2.0 NEC championship in 2011 and 2012, and the Formula Renault 2.0 Alps championship in 2011.

==== Formula 3 ====
Riberas made one appearance in the 2012 European F3 Open Championship, finishing on the podium in both races of his lone event.

=== SportsCars ===
==== Porsche Cups ====
Riberas began competing in Porsche Carrera Cup Germany in 2013, and in 2014 began competing in the Porsche Supercup championship as a member of Porsche's junior driver program. Riberas finished fifth in the 2015 Porsche Supercup championship.

==== IMSA SportsCar Championship ====
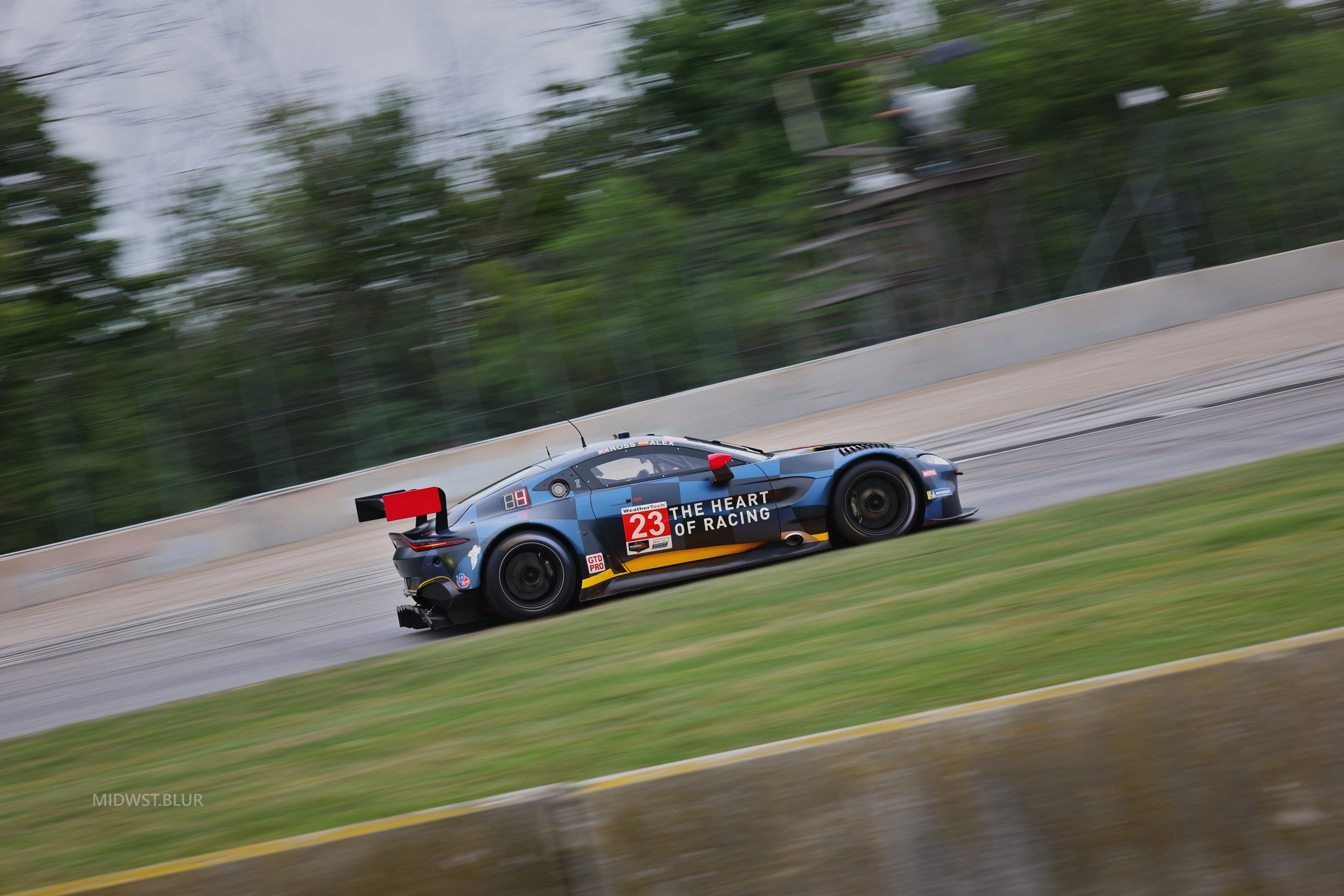
Riberas competing at Road America in 2022.

Riberas began competing in the IMSA SportsCar Championship in 2014, competing in endurance races for the season with Alex Job Racing. In 2015, Riberas won in class in the 12 Hours of Sebring with teammates Ian James and Mario Farnbacher. Riberas earned another win during the 2016 season.

Riberas has competed for Heart of Racing Team since 2020 after becoming an Aston Martin factory driver. He has competed full-time in the series since 2022 in the GTD Pro class.

==== World Endurance Championship ====
Riberas made his debut in the FIA World Endurance Championship in 2023 after Heart of Racing Team took over the entry vacated by Northwest AMR. This included his debut in the 24 Hours of Le Mans, where he finished sixth in class. Riberas continued in the 2024 season’s LMGT3 class before moving to the Hypercar category in 2025.

== Racing record ==
=== Career summary ===
Season	Series	Team	Races	Wins	Poles	F/Laps	Podiums	Points	Position
2010	Eurocup Formula Renault 2.0	Epsilon Euskadi	15	0	0	0	2	55	8th
2010	Formula Renault 2.0 UK Championship	Epsilon Euskadi	2	0	0	1	0	14	26th
2011	Eurocup Formula Renault 2.0	EPIC Racing	14	1	0	1	3	82	6th
2011	Formula Renault 2.0 Northern European Cup	EPIC Racing	2	0	0	0	0	0	NC†
2011	Formula Renault 2.0 Alps Series	EPIC Racing	4	2	0	2	2	88	15th
2012	Eurocup Formula Renault 2.0	Josef Kaufmann Racing	14	0	0	2	0	62	9th
2012	Formula Renault 2.0 Northern European Cup	Josef Kaufmann Racing	7	1	2	0	1	97	16th
2012	European F3 Open Championship	EmiliodeVillota Motorsport	2	0	0	0	2	0	NC†
2013	Porsche Carrera Cup Germany	Attempto Racing powered by Motorvision	15	0	1	1	1	85	11th
2014	United Sports Car Championship - GTD	Alex Job Racing / Team Seattle	3	0	0	0	1	77	32nd
2014	Porsche Supercup	McGregor powered by Attempto Racing	8	0	0	0	0	43	12th
2014	Porsche Carrera Cup Germany	Attempto Racing by Häring	17	0	1	0	2	114	9th
2014	ADAC GT Masters	Farnbacher Racing	2	0	0	0	0	0	NC
2015	United Sports Car Championship - GTD	Alex Job Racing / Team Seattle	3	1	0	0	1	62	24th
2015	Porsche Supercup	The Heart of Racing by Lechner	10	1	0	3	3	122	5th
2015	Porsche Carrera Cup Germany	The Heart of Racing by Lechner	17	0	0	2	3	155	6th
2016	IMSA SportsCar Championship - GTD	Alex Job Racing / Team Seattle	11	1	0	0	2	285	5th
2016-17	Asian Le Mans Series - GT	DH Racing	4	1	1	0	2	54	**2nd**
2017	Pirelli World Challenge - GT	R. Ferri Motorsport	5	0	1	2	1	81	29th
2018	24H GT Series - A6	Attempto Racing							
2018	Blancpain GT Series Endurance Cup	Belgian Audi Club Team WRT	5	1	0	1	1	37	7th
2018	Blancpain GT Series Sprint Cup	Belgian Audi Club Team WRT	10	3	0	1	6	90.5	**2nd**
2018	ADAC GT Masters	Montaplast by Land-Motorsport	2	0	0	0	0	5	38th
2019	IMSA SportsCar Championship - GTD	Moorespeed	4	0	0	0	0	59	38th
2019	Blancpain GT Series Endurance Cup	Belgian Audi Club Team WRT	5	0	0	0	1	15	17th
2020	IMSA SportsCar Championship - GTD	Heart of Racing Team	1	0	0	0	0	13	59th
2021	IMSA SportsCar Championship - GTD	Heart of Racing Team	3	0	0	0	0	669	33rd
2021	24H GT Series - GT4	Heart of Racing Team							
2022	IMSA SportsCar Championship - GTD Pro	Heart of Racing Team	10	2	0	0	4	3103	4th
2022	24H GT Series - GT4	Heart of Racing Team							
2022	GT World Challenge Europe Endurance Cup	Heart of Racing with TF Sport	1	0	0	0	0	0	NC
2023	IMSA SportsCar Championship - GTD Pro	Heart of Racing Team	11	2	0	0	3	3427	5th
2023	FIA World Endurance Championship - LMGTE Am	Northwest AMR	4	0	0	0	1	51	9th
2024	Intercontinental GT Challenge	Heart of Racing by SPS	1	0	0	0	0	2	24th
2024	IMSA SportsCar Championship - GTD Pro	Heart of Racing Team	8	1	0	2	5	2558	9th
2024	FIA World Endurance Championship - LMGT3	Heart of Racing Team	8	1	1	0	3	83	5th
2025	FIA World Endurance Championship - Hypercar	Aston Martin THOR Team	8	0	0	0	0	19	22nd
2025	IMSA SportsCar Championship - GTP	Aston Martin THOR Team	2	0	0	0	1	585	29th
2025	IMSA SportsCar Championship - GTD Pro	Heart of Racing Team	1	0	0	0	0	191	43th
2025	Intercontinental GT Challenge	Heart of Racing by SPS	1	0	0	0	0	0	NC
2026	IMSA SportsCar Championship - GTP	Aston Martin THOR Team	3	0	0	1	0	755	23rd
2026	FIA World Endurance Championship - Hypercar	Aston Martin THOR Team	8	0	0	0	0	6	25th

=== Complete Eurocup Formula Renault 2.0 results ===
(key) (Races in bold indicate pole position; races in italics indicate fastest lap)

Year	Entrant	1	2	3	4	5	6	7	8	9	10	11	12	13	14	15	16	DC	Points
2010	Epsilon Euskadi	ALC; 1; 10	ALC; 2; 5	SPA; 1 Ret	SPA; 2 DNS	BRN; 1; 6	BRN; 2; 2	MAG; 1; 10	MAG; 2 Ret	HUN; 1; 10	HUN; 2; 13	HOC; 1; 11	HOC; 2; 12	SIL; 1; 14	SIL; 2; 9	CAT; 1; 3	CAT; 2; 7	8th	55
2011	EPIC Racing	ALC; 1; 3	ALC; 2 Ret	SPA; 1; 8	SPA; 2; 8	NÜR; 1; 16	NÜR; 2; 8	HUN; 1 Ret	HUN; 2; 4	SIL; 1; 2	SIL; 2; 31	LEC; 1; 31	LEC; 2; 30	CAT; 1; 30	**CAT**; **2**; 1			6th	82
2012	Josef Kaufmann Racing	ALC; 1; 10	ALC; 2; 11	SPA; 1; 5	SPA; 2; 19	NÜR; 1; 6	NÜR; 2 Ret	MSC; 1; 7	MSC; 2 Ret	HUN; 1; 5	HUN; 2; 10	LEC; 1; 17	LEC; 2; 8	CAT; 1; 4	CAT; 2; 5			9th	62

=== Complete Formula Renault 2.0 NEC results ===
(key) (Races in bold indicate pole position) (Races in italics indicate fastest lap)

Year	Entrant	1	2	3	4	5	6	7	8	9	10	11	12	13	14	15	16	17	18	19	20	DC	Points
2011	EPIC Racing	HOC; 1	HOC; 2	HOC; 3	SPA; 1; 8	SPA; 2; 8	NÜR; 1	NÜR; 2	ASS; 1	ASS; 2	ASS; 3	OSC; 1	OSC; 2	ZAN; 1	ZAN; 2	MST; 1	MST; 2	MST; 3	MNZ; 1	MNZ; 2	MNZ; 3	NC†	0
2012	Josef Kaufmann Racing	HOC; 1; 14	HOC; 2; 4	HOC; 3; 4	NÜR; 1; 10	NÜR; 2; 22	OSC; 1	OSC; 2	OSC; 3	ASS; 1	ASS; 2	**RBR**; **1**; 1	**RBR**; **2**; 6	MST; 1	MST; 2	MST; 3	ZAN; 1	ZAN; 2	ZAN; 3	SPA; 1	SPA; 2	16th	97

† As Riberas was a guest driver, he was ineligible for points

=== Complete Formula Renault 2.0 Alps Series results ===
(key) (Races in bold indicate pole position; races in italics indicate fastest lap)

Year	Team	1	2	3	4	5	6	7	8	9	10	11	12	13	14	Pos	Points
2011	EPIC Racing	MNZ; 1	MNZ; 2	IMO; 1	IMO; 2	PAU; 1	PAU; 2	RBR; 1; 5	RBR; 2; 17	HUN; 1	HUN; 2	LEC; 1	LEC; 2	SPA; 1; 1	SPA; 2; 1	15th	88

=== Complete Porsche Supercup results ===
(key) (Races in bold indicate pole position; races in italics indicate fastest lap)

Year	Team	1	2	3	4	5	6	7	8	9	10	11	Pos.	Pts
2014	McGregor powered by Attempto Racing	CAT; 5	MON; 19	RBR; 7	SIL; Ret	HOC; 13	HUN; 4	SPA; 16	MNZ; 14	COA	COA		12th	43
2015	The Heart of Racing by Lechner	CAT; 5	MON; 6	RBR; 3	**SIL**; 2	HUN; 5	SPA; 11	**SPA**; 7	MNZ; 7	MNZ; 6	COA; C	**COA**; 1	5th	122

=== Complete IMSA SportsCar Championship results ===
(key) (Races in bold indicate pole position; results in italics indicate fastest lap)

Year	Team	Class	Make	Engine	1	2	3	4	5	6	7	8	9	10	11	12	Pos.	Points	Ref
2014	Alex Job Racing / Team Seattle	GTD	Porsche 911 GT America	Porsche 4.0 L Flat-6	DAY; 15	SEB; 3	LGA	BEL	WGL	MOS	IMS	ELK	VIR	COA	PET; 5		32nd	77	
2015	Alex Job Racing / Team Seattle	GTD	Porsche 911 GT America	Porsche 4.0 L Flat-6	DAY; 18	SEB; 1	LGA	BEL	WGL	LIM	ELK	VIR	COA	PET; 7			24th	62	
2016	Alex Job Racing / Team Seattle	GTD	Porsche 911 GT3 R	Porsche 4.0 L Flat-6	DAY; 8	SEB; 4	LGA; 1	BEL; 4	WGL; 3	MOS; 12	LIM; 14	ELK; 12	VIR; 4	COA; 7	PET; 8		5th	285	
2019	Moorespeed	GTD	Audi R8 LMS Evo	Audi 5.2 L V10	DAY; 11	SEB; 17	MOH; 6	BEL	WGL; DNS	MOS	LIM	ELK	VIR	LGA	PET		38th	59	
2020	Heart of Racing Team	GTD	Aston Martin Vantage AMR GT3	Mercedes-Benz M177 4.0 L Turbo V8	DAY; 18	DAY	SEB	ELK	VIR	ATL	MOH	CLT	PET	LGA	SEB		59th	13	
2021	Heart of Racing Team	GTD	Aston Martin Vantage AMR GT3	Aston Martin 4.0 L Turbo V8	DAY	SEB	MOH	BEL	WGL	WGL	LIM	ELK	LGA; 12	LBH; 12	VIR; 6	PET	33rd	669	
2022	Heart of Racing Team	GTD Pro	Aston Martin Vantage AMR GT3	Aston Martin 4.0 L Turbo V8	DAY; 13	SEB; 11	LBH; 1	LGA; 5	WGL; 1	MOS; 3	LIM; 2	ELK; 4	VIR; 4	PET; 4			4th	3103	
2023	Heart of Racing Team	GTD Pro	Aston Martin Vantage AMR GT3	Aston Martin 4.0 L Turbo V8	DAY; 7	SEB; 8	LBH; 4	LGA; 5	WGL; 6	MOS; 5	LIM; 1	ELK; 1	VIR; 4	IMS; 2	PET; 4		5th	3427	
2024	Heart of Racing Team	GTD Pro	Aston Martin Vantage AMR GT3 Evo	Aston Martin M177 4.0 L Turbo V8	DAY; 4	SEB; 5	LGA	DET; 3	WGL; 1	MOS	ELK; 3	VIR; 3	IMS; 5	PET; 3			9th	2558	
2025	Heart of Racing Team	GTD Pro	Aston Martin Vantage AMR GT3 Evo	Aston Martin 4.0 L Turbo V8	DAY; 14						MOS		VIR				43rd	191	
2025	Aston Martin THOR Team	GTP	Aston Martin Valkyrie AMR-LMH	Aston Martin RA 6.5 L V12		SEB; 9	LBH	LGA	DET	WGL		ELK		IMS	PET; 2		29th	585	
2026	Aston Martin THOR Team	GTP	Aston Martin Valkyrie AMR-LMH	Aston Martin RA 6.5 L V12	DAY; 10	SEB; 9	LBH	LGA	DET	WGL	ELK	IMS	PET; 5				23rd	755	

* Season still in progress

=== Complete FIA World Endurance Championship results ===
Year	Entrant	Class	Car	Engine	1	2	3	4	5	6	7	8	Rank	Points
2023	Northwest AMR	GTE Am	Aston Martin Vantage AMR	Aston Martin M177 4.0 L Turbo V8	SEB	PRT	SPA; 7	LMS; 6	MNZ	FUJ; 7	BHR; 3		9th	51
2024	Heart of Racing Team	LMGT3	Aston Martin Vantage AMR GT3 Evo	Aston Martin 4.0 L Turbo V8	QAT; 2	IMO; 5	SPA; 11	LMS; Ret	SÃO; 2	**COA**; 1	FUJ; 9	BHR; 11	5th	83
2025	Aston Martin THOR Team	Hypercar	Aston Martin Valkyrie AMR-LMH	Aston Martin RA 6.5 L V12	QAT; 17	IMO; 17	SPA; 14	LMS; 12	SÃO; 13	COA; Ret	FUJ; 5	BHR; 7	22nd	19
2026	Aston Martin THOR Team	Hypercar	Aston Martin Valkyrie	Aston Martin RA 6.5 L V12	IMO; 14	SPA; Ret	LMS; 13	SÃO; 9	COA; 14	FUJ; 9	CAT; 9	MNZ; 14	25th	6

* Season still in progress

=== 24 Hours of Le Mans results ===
Year	Team	Co-Drivers	Car	Class	Laps	Pos.	Class Pos.
2023	(Canada) Northwest AMR	(United Kingdom) Ian James (Italy) Daniel Mancinelli	Aston Martin Vantage AMR	GTE; Am	310	33rd	6th
2024	(United States) Heart of Racing Team	(United Kingdom) Ian James (Italy) Daniel Mancinelli	Aston Martin Vantage AMR GT3 Evo	LMGT3	196	DNF	DNF
2025	(United States) Aston Martin THOR Team	(Canada) Roman De Angelis (Denmark) Marco Sørensen	Aston Martin Valkyrie AMR-LMH	Hypercar	383	12th	12th
2026	(United States) Aston Martin THOR Team	(Canada) Roman De Angelis (Denmark) Marco Sørensen	Aston Martin Valkyrie AMR	Hypercar	372	14th	14th

=== 24 Hours of Daytona results ===
Year	Team	Co-drivers	Car	Class	Laps	Pos.	Class Pos.
2014	(United States) Alex Job Racing / Team Seattle	(Germany) Mario Farnbacher (Germany) Marco Holzer (United Kingdom) Ian James	Porsche 911 GT America	GTD	639	34th	15th
2015	(United States) Alex Job Racing / Team Seattle	(Germany) Mario Farnbacher (United Kingdom) Ian James	Porsche 911 GT America	GTD	233	DNF	DNF
2016	(United States) Alex Job Racing / Team Seattle	(Germany) Mario Farnbacher (United Kingdom) Ian James (Germany) Wolf Henzler	Porsche 911 GT3 R	GTD	700	22nd	8th
2019	(United States) Moorespeed	(United States) Andrew Davis (United States) Will Hardeman (Germany) Marcus Winkelhock	Audi R8 LMS	GTD	555	30th	11th
2020	(United States) Heart of Racing Team	(Canada) Roman De Angelis (United Kingdom) Ian James (Denmark) Nicki Thiim	Aston Martin Vantage AMR GT3	GTD	151	DNF	DNF
2022	(United States) Heart of Racing Team	(United Kingdom) Ross Gunn (Belgium) Maxime Martin	Aston Martin Vantage AMR GT3	GTD Pro	103	DNF	DNF
2023	(United States) Heart of Racing Team	(United Kingdom) David Pittard (United Kingdom) Ross Gunn	Aston Martin Vantage AMR GT3	GTD Pro	716	36th	7th

=== 12 Hours of Sebring results ===
Year	Team	Co-drivers	Car	Class	Laps	Pos.	Class Pos.
2014	(United States) Alex Job Racing / Team Seattle	(Germany) Mario Farnbacher (United Kingdom) Ian James	Porsche 911 GT America	GTD	278	25th	**3rd**
2015	(United States) Alex Job Racing / Team Seattle	(Germany) Mario Farnbacher (United Kingdom) Ian James	Porsche 911 GT America	GTD	318	15th	**1st**
2016	(United States) Alex Job Racing / Team Seattle	(Germany) Mario Farnbacher (United Kingdom) Ian James	Porsche 911 GT3 R	GTD	229	25th	4th
2019	(United States) Moorespeed	(United States) Andrew Davis (United States) Will Hardeman	Audi R8 LMS	GTD	174	DNF	DNF
2022	(United States) Heart of Racing Team	(United Kingdom) Ross Gunn (Belgium) Maxime Martin	Aston Martin Vantage AMR GT3	GTD Pro	230	DNF	DNF
2023	(United States) Heart of Racing Team	(United Kingdom) David Pittard (United Kingdom) Ross Gunn	Aston Martin Vantage AMR GT3	GTD Pro	297	37th	8th
2024	(United States) Heart of Racing Team	(Germany) Mario Farnbacher (United Kingdom) Ross Gunn	Aston Martin Vantage AMR GT3 Evo	GTD Pro	316	24th	5th
2025	(United States) Aston Martin THOR Team	(Canada) Roman De Angelis (United Kingdom) Ross Gunn	Aston Martin Valkyrie AMR-LMH	GTP	351	9th	9th
2026	(United States) Aston Martin THOR Team	(Canada) Roman De Angelis (United Kingdom) Ross Gunn	Aston Martin Valkyrie AMR-LMH	GTP	331	19th	9th

=== 24 Hours of Spa results ===
Year	Team	Co-Drivers	Car	Class	Laps	Pos.	Class Pos.
2018	(Belgium) Audi Sport Team WRT	(Germany) Christopher Mies (Belgium) Dries Vanthoor	Audi R8 LMS	Pro	456	40th	21st
2019	(Belgium) Audi Sport Team WRT	(Germany) Frank Stippler (Belgium) Dries Vanthoor	Audi R8 LMS	Pro	358	25th	21st
2022	(United States) Heart of Racing w/ TF Sport	(Republic of Ireland) Charlie Eastwood (United Kingdom) Ross Gunn	Aston Martin Vantage AMR GT3	Pro	497	38th	17th
