= Oswaldo Negri Jr. =

Brazilian racing driver from São Paulo (born 1964)

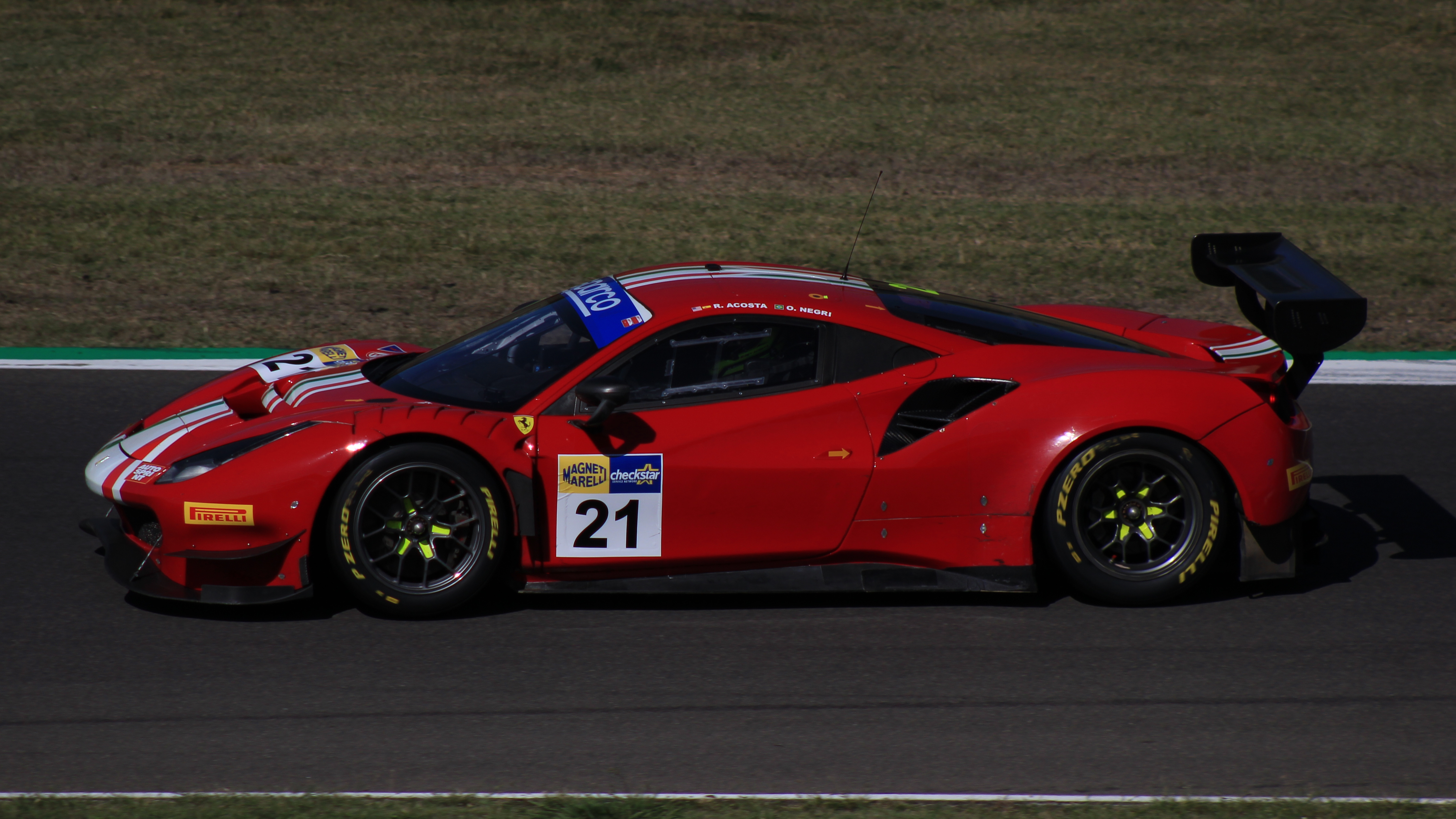
- Nationality: (Brazil) Brazilian
- Born: May 29, 1964 (age 62) São Paulo, Brazil
- Relatives: João Vergara (nephew)

Grand Am Rolex Sports Car Series career
- Debut season: 2003
- Current team: Michael Shank Racing
- Categorisation: FIA Gold (until 2014); FIA Silver (2015–2019); FIA Bronze (2020–)
- Car number: 60
- Former teams: Inline Cunningham Racing; Cegwa Sport
- Starts: 99
- Wins: 3
- Poles: 2

Previous series
- 1998, 2000 1997, 1999 1993–1996 1990 1987–1989, 1992: Indy Lights Panamericana; Indy Lights; Mexican Formula 3 F3 Sudamericana; British Formula 3

Championship titles
- 1998: Indy Lights Panamericana

Oswaldo "Ozz" Negri Jr. (born May 29, 1964) is a Brazilian racing driver from São Paulo.

== Racing career ==
=== Formula Three and Indy Lights ===
Negri raced part-time in the British Formula Three Championship from 1987 to 1989 with few good results. He returned to his native Brazil in 1990 to race in Brazilian Formula Three Championship, where he won the championship, and Formula 3 Sudamericana where he finished ninth. With newfound confidence, he returned to British F3 in 1992 and finished fourth. In 1993, he went to the Mexican Formula Three Championship and raced there until 1996. In 1997, he raced in Indy Lights part-time for Genoa Racing and finished 20th. In 1998, he won the Mexican version of Indy Lights, Indy Lights Panamericana. He made one Indy Lights start in 1999 and finished third in Indy Lights Panamericana in 2000.

=== Grand-Am sports cars ===
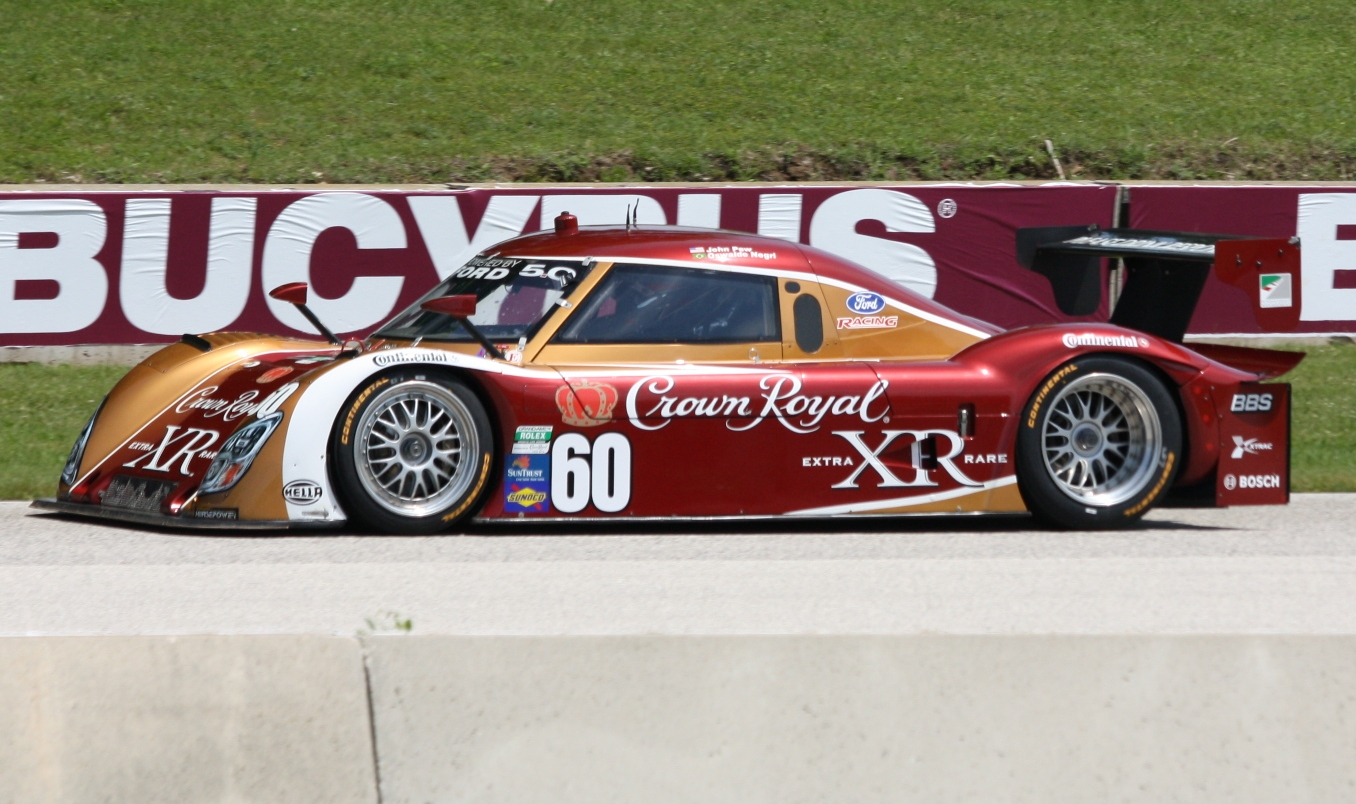
2011 Rolex Sports Car

Negri moved to sports car racing in 2003 racing in the Grand-Am Rolex Sports Car Series. He joined Michael Shank Racing and raced full-time in the series in 2004 and finished 12th in points, winning the league's rising star award which he shared with Max Angelelli. He captured his first victory in 2006 at Miller Motorsports Park and finished second in the 24 Hours of Daytona. He finished eighth in points in both 2006 and 2007. In 2008, he finished tenth, winning in the first race held at the New Jersey Motorsports Park. He stayed with the team in 2009 and finished 8th in points. In 2010, he finished tenth in points and in 2011 improved to a career-best sixth. He won the 24 Hours of Daytona in 2012 for Michael Shank Racing with teammates A. J. Allmendinger, John Pew, and Justin Wilson. It was his first Rolex Sports Car Series win since 2008.

== Racing record ==
=== Complete American Open Wheel racing results ===
(key)

==== Indy Lights ====
Year	Team	1	2	3	4	5	6	7	8	9	10	11	12	13	Rank	Points	Ref
1997	Genoa Racing	MIA	LBH; 27	NAZ	SAV; 7	STL	MIL	DET	POR; 9	TOR; 8	TRO; 21	VAN; 20	LAG; 27	FON	20th	15	
1999	Genoa Racing	MIA	LBH; 7	NAZ	MIL	POR	CLE	TOR	MIS	DET	CHI	LAG	FON		20th	6	

=== IMSA WeatherTech SportsCar Championship series results ===
Year	Team	Class	Make	Engine	1	2	3	4	5	6	7	8	9	10	11	12	Rank	Points
2014	Michael Shank Racing	P	Ford EcoBoost Riley DP	Ford Ecoboost 3.5 L V6 Turbo	DAY; 12	SEB; 9	LBH; 9	LGA; 10	BEL; 4	WGL; 7	MOS; 5	IND; 6	ELK; 2	COA; 5	PET; 6		7th	281
2015	Michael Shank Racing w/ Curb Agajanian	P	Ligier JS P2	Honda HR28TT 2.8 L V6 Turbo	DAY; 5	SEB; 13	LBH; 6	LGA; 3	BEL; 2	WGL; 7	MOS; 3	ELK; 4	AUS; 4	PET; 9			6th	273
2016	Michael Shank Racing w/ Curb Agajanian	P	Ligier JS P2	Honda HR35TT 3.5 L V6 Turbo	DAY; 11	SEB; 7	LBH; 7	LGA; 1	BEL; 5	WGL; 3	MOS; 6	ELK; 4	AUS; 6	PET; 1			4th	282
2017	Michael Shank Racing w/ Curb Agajanian	GTD	Acura NSX GT3	Acura 3.5 L Turbo V6	DAY; 5	SEB; 8	LBH; 10	AUS; 11	DET; 5	WGL; 16	MOS; 10	LIM; 9	ELK; 14	VIR; 14	LGA; 10	PET; 12	13th	248
2018	Squadra Corse Garage Italia	GTD	Ferrari 488 GT3	Ferrari F154CB 3.9 L Turbo V8	DAY	SEB	MOH	BEL	WGL; DNF	MOS	LIM	ELK; 10	VIR	LGA; 6	PET		37th	59

* Season still in progress

=== 24 Hours of Le Mans results ===
Year	Team	Co-Drivers	Car	Class	Laps	Pos.	Class Pos.
2016	(United States) Michael Shank Racing	(United States) John Pew (Belgium) Laurens Vanthoor	Ligier JS P2-Honda	LMP2	345	14th	9th
2020	(Switzerland) Luzich Racing	(France) Côme Ledogar (Puerto Rico) Francesco Piovanetti	Ferrari 488 GTE Evo	GTE; Am	335	32nd	7th

Sporting positions
Preceded by Christian Fittipaldi	Brazilian Formula Three Champion; 1990	Succeeded by Marcos Gueiros
