= Team Seattle =

Racing team

(United States) Team Seattle
- Founded: 1997
- Team principal(s): Don Kitch, Jr.
- Current series: WeatherTech SportsCar Championship (as The Heart of Racing)
- Former series: Rolex Sports Car Series; Le Mans Series; IMSA GT Championship; USRRC

Team Seattle is an endurance auto racing team and charitable organization founded by racing driver Don Kitch Jr. in 1997 to raise funds for the Seattle Children's Hospital. Team Seattle's drivers and other supporting teams who compete in the 24 Hours of Daytona gain pledges from donors based on the number of laps their cars can complete over the event. Since first entering Daytona in 1997, Team Seattle has raised over $3.3 million for Seattle Children's. A new endeavor for 2009 will have Team Seattle participate in another endurance event, the 24 Hours of Le Mans in France, and also raised funds for the Mecenat Chirurgie Cardiaque Enfants du Monde. The team's driving squad included the American actor Patrick Dempsey finishing 9th overall.

== History ==
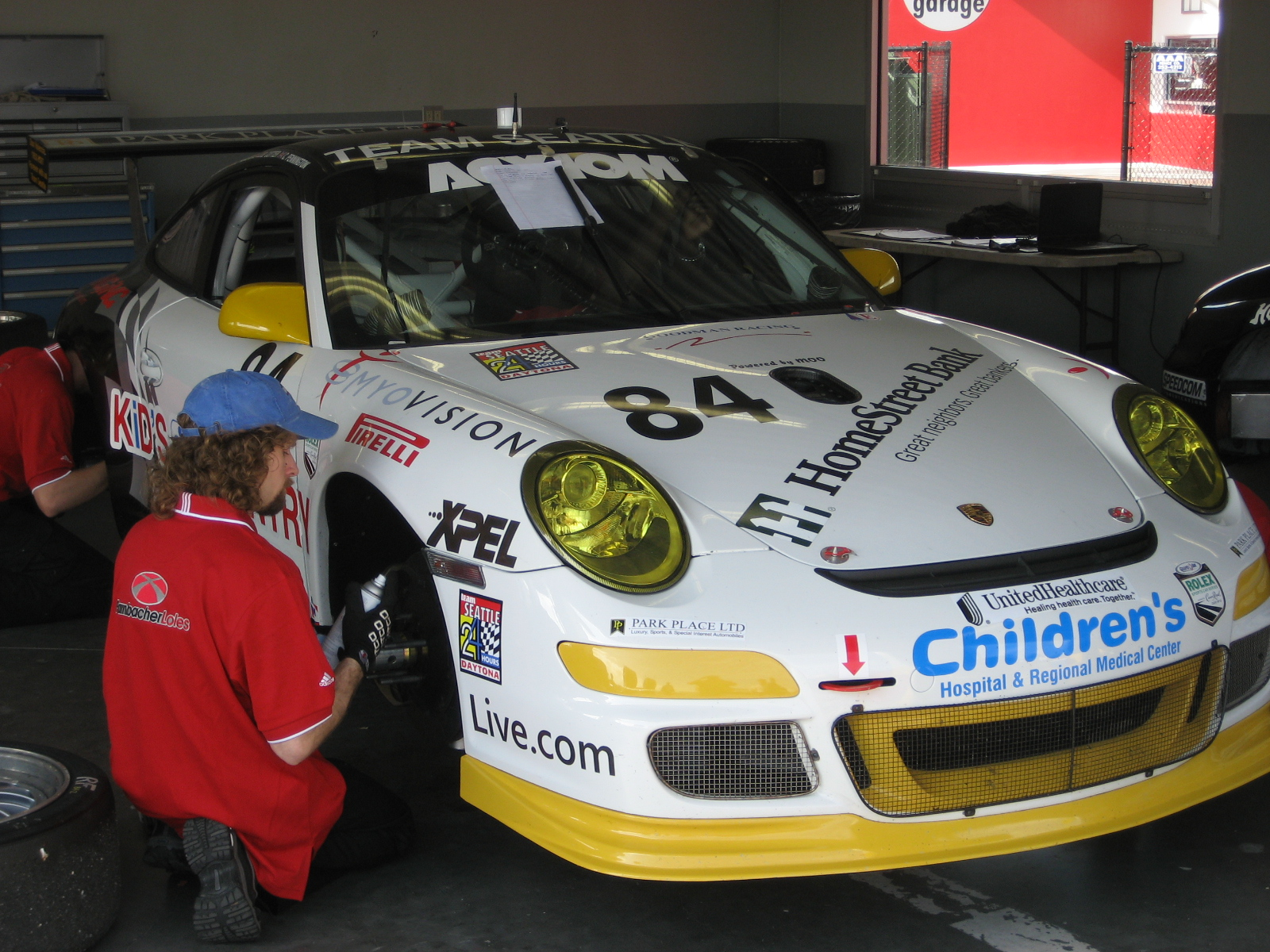
A Team Seattle Porsche at the 2008 24 Hours of Daytona

Team Seattle debuted at the 1997 24 Hours of Daytona, backing a Porsche from the Alex Job Racing team, before expanding to two cars in 1998. The two car effort was boosted in 1999 by the addition of professional drivers Kelly Collins, Anthony Lazzaro, and Cort Wagner who led one of two Team Seattle-backed Alex Job Porsches to victory in their class. In 2000 Team Seattle began a partnership with The Racer's Group, another Porsche squad, before switching to the faster GTS category in 2002 with Park Place Racing's Saleens.

Team Seattle made their first entry into the sports prototype categories by joining with Essex Racing in 2003, where they finished first and second within their class in a Lola-Nissan. Essex Racing switched to Multimatic-Fords in 2004, but were not able to repeat their success in the new Daytona Prototype category. The team returned to Porsches in the lower categories in 2005 with a two-car effort with Synergy Racing, joined by corporate backing from Microsoft in 2006. Team Seattle made another partnership in 2008, joining Farnbacher-Loles Racing.

=== 2009 Le Mans entry ===
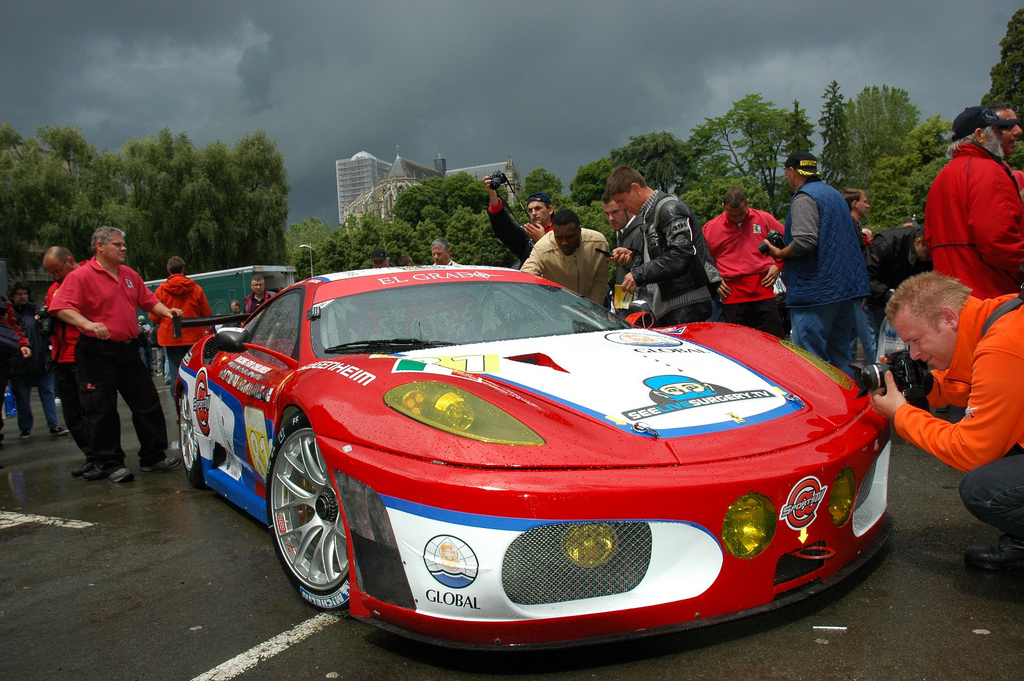
The Advanced Engineering Ferrari F430, supported by Team Seattle at the 2009 24 Hours of Le Mans

Team Seattle announced a partnership with Italian racing team AF Corse to apply for an entry to the 2009 24 Hours of Le Mans, not only to raise funds for Seattle Children's, but also for the French Mecenant Chirurgie Cardiaque. Although initially being granted a reserve entry, Team Seattle was granted a full entry on March 31, 2009, following the withdrawal of another competitor. Team Seattle made use of a Ferrari F430 GT2 from AF Corse's Advanced Engineering squad. Founder Don Kitch Jr. and racing driver Joe Foster were joined by the actor Patrick Dempsey, a regular competitor in the Rolex Sports Car Series.

Pledges to the team were raised not only by the car's lap total, but also by allowing donations in exchange for personal photos to be added to the car's paint scheme. The team expected to raise $1 million at the event.

== Collaboration with Heart of Racing ==
In 2014, former Team Seattle driver, Ian James founded The Heart of Racing, which would become a partner of Team Seattle and Alex Job Racing from 2014 until 2016.

The team returned for the 2020 season, with drivers Roman De Angelis, Alex Riberas, Ian James, Nicki Thiim and Darren Turner. While they didn't win a race in that season, their best result came at the 2020 12 Hours of Sebring where they finished 2nd.

The Team would achieve their first win at the 2021 Detroit SportsCar Classic with Roman De Angelis and Ross Gunn at the wheel, after another team failed to meet the minimum refueling time. They would achieve 2 more wins that season, en route to a 3rd place in GTD Standings.

For 2022 the team would field a second car in GTD Pro for Alex Riberas, Ross Gunn, Maxime Martin and Tom Gamble. They would finish 4th in the standings, while Roman De Angelis won the GTD championship.

2023 wasn't so successful for the team as they finished 5th in GTD Pro and 2nd in GTD.
