= Matt McMurry =

American racing driver

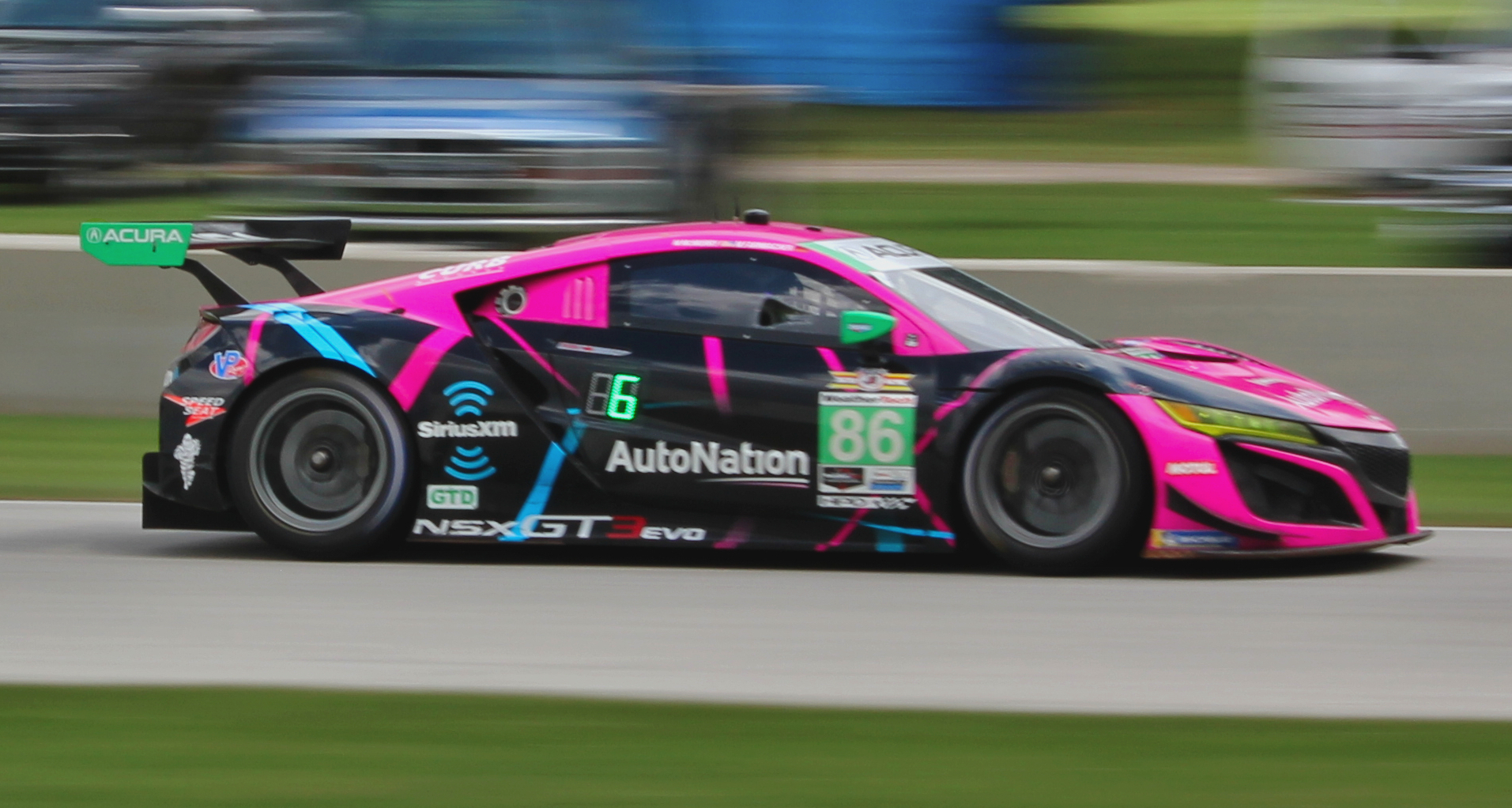
- Nationality: (United States) American
- Born: Matthew Merrill McMurry; 24 November 1997 (age 28) Phoenix, Arizona, USA
- Relatives: Chris McMurry (father)
- Categorisation: FIA Silver

Matthew Merrill McMurry (born November 24, 1997) is an American racing driver.

In 2014, McMurry became the first junior development driver for Dyson Racing and a few months later at the age of 16 years and 202 days old became the youngest driver to participate in and finish the 24 Hours of Le Mans. He is a second generation driver and son of Chris McMurry, LMP2 class winner of the 12 Hours of Sebring in 2005. He is an alumnus of The Henry Samueli School of Engineering at University of California, Irvine.

== Career ==
McMurry has been racing cars since the age of 14, competing in Formula Skip Barber, U.S. F2000 Championship, Formula Bondurant, Prototype Lites and the European Le Mans Series. Through the age of 16, he has total 71 car races with an 8% winning, 21% podium position and 10% fastest lap rate. Prior to racing cars, he raced in karting from the age of five to 12, mostly locally in Arizona.

== 24 Hours of Le Mans ==
After back-to-back fourth-place finishes in the 2014 European Le Mans Series at Silverstone and Imola, McMurry was asked to join American Chris Dyson and Englishman Tom Kimber-Smith for the 82nd 24 Hours of Le Mans in the No. 42 LMP2 class entry by Greaves Motorsport from Peterborough, England.

The entry qualified 19th overall and tenth in class. When McMurry was handed the car by Kimber-Smith at about the 43 minute mark in the race, he became the youngest driver to ever participate in the race, breaking the record held by Mexican Ricardo Rodriguez and set 55 years earlier in 1959. Rodriguez was 17 years and 126 days old at the time.

After a 60+ minute pit stop during the 20th hour, the team finished the race 25th overall and 11th in class, having run over 2,600 miles. McMurry broke the record for youngest to finish the race, a mark previously set by American Gunnar Jeannette in 2000 at the age of 18 years and 44 days old.

== Racing record ==
=== IMSA Cooper Tires Prototype Lites ===
| Year | Team | 1 | 2 | 3 | 4 | 5 | 6 | 7 | 8 | 9 | 10 | 11 | 12 | 13 | 14 | Rank | Points |
|---|---|---|---|---|---|---|---|---|---|---|---|---|---|---|---|---|---|
| 2013 | Performance Tech | SEB | SEB | LGA | LGA | MOH | MOH | MOS | MOS | ROA; 6 | ROA; 5 | COA; 5 | COA; 18 | ATL; 6 | ATL; 12 | 14th | 48 |
| 2014 | JDC MotorSports | SEB; 23 | SEB; 5 | KAN; 13 | KAN; 9 | WGL; 6 | WGL; 13 | MOS; 17 | MOS; 8 | ROA; 19 | ROA; 2 | VIR; 3 | VIR; 2 | ATL; 1 | ATL; 12 | 6th | 121 |
| 2015 | JDC MotorSports | SEB; 11 | SEB; 4 | NOL; 3 | NOL; 2 | WGL; 5 | WGL; 12 | MOS; 10 | MOS; 3 | ROA; 2 | ROA; Ret | VIR; 3 | VIR; 2 | ATL; 2 | ATL; 2 | 3rd | 179 |

=== 24 Hours of Le Mans results ===
| Year | Team | Co-Drivers | Car | Class | Laps | Pos. | Class Pos. |
|---|---|---|---|---|---|---|---|
| 2014 | (Malaysia) Caterham Racing | (United Kingdom) Tom Kimber-Smith (United States) Chris Dyson | Zytek Z11SN-Nissan | LMP2 | 329 | 25th | 11th |
| 2017 | (Portugal) Algarve Pro Racing | (United States) Mark Patterson (France) Vincent Capillaire | Ligier JS P217-Gibson | LMP2 | 330 | 32nd | 15th |
| 2020 | (Portugal) Algarve Pro Racing | (United States) John Falb (Switzerland) Simon Trummer | Oreca 07-Gibson | LMP2 | 365 | 11th | 7th |

=== European Le Mans Series ===
| Year | Team | 1 | 2 | 3 | 4 | 5 | 6 | Rank | Points |
|---|---|---|---|---|---|---|---|---|---|
| 2014 | Greaves Motorsport | SIL; 4 | IMO; 4 | RBR; 6 | LEC; 10 | EST; 7 | | 7th | 38 |
| 2017 | Algarve Pro Racing | SIL; 12 | MNZ; 12 | RBR; 13 | LEC; 8 | SPA; 12 | ALG; 11 | 20th | 4.5 |

=== IMSA WeatherTech Sportscar Championship ===
| Year | Team | Class | Make | Engine | 1 | 2 | 3 | 4 | 5 | 6 | 7 | 8 | 9 | 10 | 11 | 12 | Rank | Points | Ref |
|---|---|---|---|---|---|---|---|---|---|---|---|---|---|---|---|---|---|---|---|
| 2015 | Michael Shank Racing w/ Curb Agajanian | P | Ligier JS P2 | Honda HR28TT 2.8 L V6 Turbo | DAY; 5 | SEB | LBH | LGA | | | | | | | ATL; 9 | | 18th | 50 | |
| 2015 | BAR1 Motorsports | PC | Oreca FLM09 | Chevrolet LS3 6.2 L V8 | | | | | BEL; 3 | | | | ELK; 5 | | | | 11th | 116 | |
| 2015 | JDC-Miller MotorSports | PC | Oreca FLM09 | Chevrolet LS3 6.2 L V8 | | | | | | WGL; 3 | MOS | LIM | | AUS; 5 | | | 11th | 116 | |
| 2016 | Park Place Motorsports | GTD | Porsche 911 GT3 R | Porsche 4.0L Flat-6 | DAY; 17 | SEB; 17 | | | | WGL; 8 | | | | VIR | | PET; 12 | 21st | 74 | |
| 2016 | BAR1 Motorsports | PC | Oreca FLM09 | Chevrolet LS3 6.2 L V8 | | | LBH | LGA; 6 | BEL | WGL; 7 | MOS; 6 | LIM; 4 | ELK; 5 | | AUS; 4 | | 10th | 138 | |
| 2017 | Park Place Motorsports | GTD | Porsche 911 GT3 R | Porsche 4.0L Flat-6 | DAY; 24 | SEB; 6 | LBH | AUS | BEL | WGL; 8 | MOS | LIM | ELK | VIR | LGA | ATL; 3 | 30th | 85 | |
| 2018 | Spirit of Daytona Racing | P | Cadillac DPi-V.R | Cadillac 5.5 L V8 | DAY; 20 | SEB; 12 | LBH | MOH | BEL; 13 | WGL; 11 | MOS | ELK | LGA | PET | | | 30th | 68 | |
| 2019 | PR1/Mathiasen Motorsports | LMP2 | Oreca 07 | Gibson GK428 4.2 L V8 | DAY; 4 | SEB; 2 | MOH; 1 | WGL; 1 | MOS; 1 | ELK; 1 | LGA; 1 | PET; 1 | | | | | 1st | 270 | |
| 2020 | Michael Shank Racing w/ Curb-Agajanian | GTD | Acura NSX GT3 Evo | Acura 3.5 L Turbo V6 | DAY; 10 | DAY; 3 | SEB | ELK; 2 | VIR; 2 | ATL; 1 | MOH; 5 | CLT; 7 | PET; 10 | LGA; 1 | SEB; 3 | | 1st | 288 | |
| 2021 | CORE Autosport | LMP3 | Ligier JS P320 | Nissan VK56DE 5.6L V8 | DAY; 5 | SEB | MOH | WGL | WGL | ELK | ATL | | | | | | NC | 0 | |
| 2021 | Richard Mille - Compass Racing | GTD | Acura NSX GT3 Evo | Acura 3.5 L Turbo V6 | DAY | SEB | MOH | DET | WGL1 | WGL2 | LIM | ELK | LGA | LBH; 11 | VIR | PET | 62nd | 221 | |
| 2023 | CrowdStrike Racing by APR | LMP2 | Oreca 07 | Gibson GK428 V8 | DAY; 2 | SEB | LGA | WGL | ELK | IMS | PET | | | | | | NC | 0 | |

=== Asian Le Mans Series ===
| Year | Entrant | Class | Chassis | Engine | 1 | 2 | 3 | 4 | Rank | Points |
|---|---|---|---|---|---|---|---|---|---|---|
| 2016-17 | Algarve Pro Racing | LMP2 | Ligier JS P2 | Judd HK 3.6 L V8 | ZHU; 2 | FUJ | CHA; 2 | SEP | 9th | 36 |

=== Blancpain GT Series Endurance Cup ===
| Year | Team | Car | Class | 1 | 2 | 3 | 4 | 5 | Rank | Points |
|---|---|---|---|---|---|---|---|---|---|---|
| 2019 | Jenson Team Rocket RJN | Honda NSX GT3 | Silver | MNZ; 5 | SIL; 6 | LEC; 9 | SPA; 4 | CAT; 12 | 8th | 44 |
