= 2015 United SportsCar Championship =

45th season of the racing series organized by IMSA

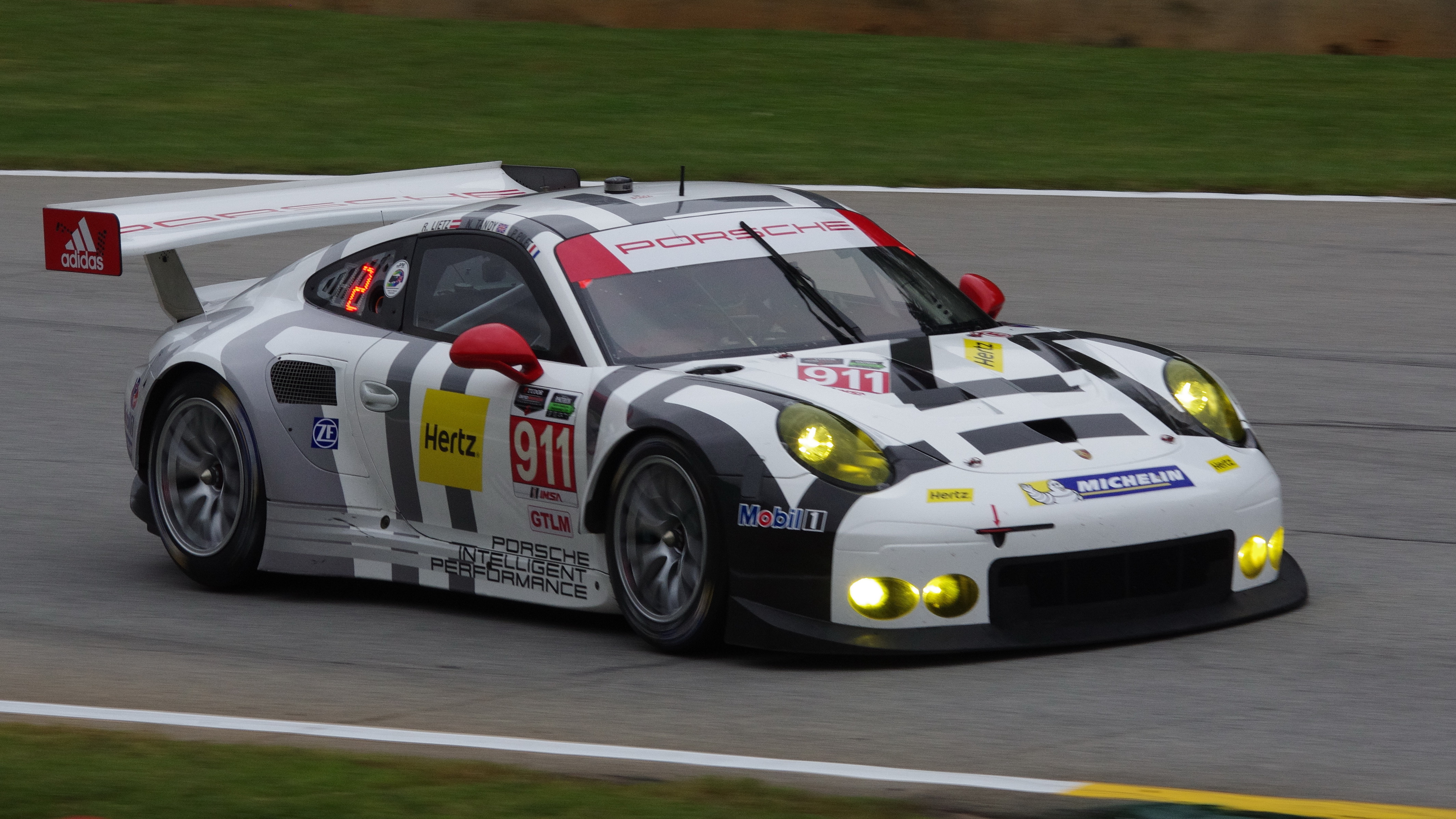
The No. 911 Porsche North America won the GT Le Mans Teams' Championship, with Porsche winning the GT Le Mans Manufacturers' championships; taking the overall victory at Petit Le Mans

The 2015 United SportsCar Championship (known for sponsorship reasons as the 2015 Tudor United SportsCar Championship) was the second season of the International Motor Sports Association's United SportsCar Championship and the last to be held under that name. It was also the 45th overall season of the IMSA GT championship tracing its lineage to the 1971 IMSA season. It began on January 24 with the 24 Hours of Daytona. and ended on October 3 at Petit Le Mans.

== Classes ==
The class structure remained largely unchanged from 2014.

- Prototype (P) (DP and LMP2)
- Prototype Challenge (PC)
- GT Le Mans (GTLM)
- GT Daytona (GTD)

2015 will see the introduction of two awards for the top-finishing Pro-Am drivers in Prototype (P) and GT Le Mans (GTLM). The Jim Trueman Award will be given to the top finishing Pro-Am pairing in Prototype, while the Bob Akin Award will be given to the top GTLM pairing. The top Pro-Am pairings from these classes at the end of the year will be given automatic entries to the 2016 24 Hours of Le Mans, with the Trueman award winner eligible for the LMP2 class, while the Akin Award winner would be for the LM GTE Am class. To be eligible for these awards, the drivers must at a minimum contest the North American Endurance Cup events.

== Schedule ==
=== Race schedule ===
The 2015 schedule was released on August 10, 2014 and featured twelve rounds. One major change to the rules for 2015 was a slight reduction of race time to fit television constraints. Two and three hour races, which were 15 minutes shorter than their times, will have their race times reduced five more minutes, so that they would be 1:40 and 2:40, respectively, instead of 1:45 and 2:45, as was the case in the previous years. The races set for 6, 10, 12, and 24 hours will remain at the respective lengths.

Race is part of the North American Endurance Cup

Rnd	Race	Length	Classes	Circuit	Location	Date
1	Rolex 24 at Daytona	24 hours	All	Daytona International Speedway	Daytona, Florida	January 24–25
2	Mobil 1 Twelve Hours of Sebring	12 hours	All	Sebring International Raceway	Sebring, Florida	March 21
3	Tequila Patrón Sports Car Showcase	1 hour 40 minutes	P, GTLM	Long Beach Street Circuit	Long Beach, California	April 18
4	Continental Tire Monterey Grand Prix	2 hours 40 minutes	All	Mazda Raceway Laguna Seca	Monterey, California	May 3
5	Chevrolet Sports Car Classic	1 hour 40 minutes	P, PC, GTD	The Raceway on Belle Isle	Detroit, Michigan	May 30
6	Sahlen's Six Hours of The Glen	6 hours	All	Watkins Glen International	Watkins Glen, New York	June 28
7	Mobil 1 SportsCar Grand Prix	2 hours 40 minutes	P, PC, GTLM	Canadian Tire Motorsport Park	Bowmanville, Ontario	July 12
8	Northeast Grand Prix	2 hours 40 minutes	PC, GTD	Lime Rock Park	Lakeville, Connecticut	July 25
9	Continental Tire Road Race Showcase	2 hours 40 minutes	All	Road America	Elkhart Lake, Wisconsin	August 9
10	Oak Tree Grand Prix	2 hours 40 minutes	GTLM, GTD	Virginia International Raceway	Alton, Virginia	August 23
11	Lone Star Le Mans	2 hours 40 minutes	All	Circuit of the Americas	Austin, Texas	September 19
12	Petit Le Mans powered by Mazda	10 hours (Note: Race shortened to 7 hours 49 minutes due to heavy rain.)	All	Road Atlanta	Braselton, Georgia	October 3

=== Calendar changes ===
- The events at Kansas Speedway and Indianapolis Motor Speedway have been discontinued.
- A round at Lime Rock Park was added for PC and GTD.
- The round at Canadian Tire Motorsports Park will see PC replace GTD alongside P and GTLM.
- The IMSA Continental Tire Sports Car Challenge support series follows the same schedule as above in 2015 except for the street circuits of Long Beach and Detroit Belle Isle for a ten-round season.
- On October 31, 2014, the calendar was modified removing PC from the Virginia International Raceway round and adding the class to the round at Detroit Belle Isle alongside P and GTD.
- The Monterey round would feature all four classes in a single event.

== Entries ==
=== Prototype ===
Team	Chassis	Engine	No.	Drivers	Rounds
(United States) DeltaWing Racing Cars with Claro/TracFone	DeltaWing DWC13	Élan (Mazda) 1.9 L Turbo I4	0	(United Kingdom) Katherine Legge	1–4, 6–7, 9, 11–12
(United States) DeltaWing Racing Cars with Claro/TracFone	DeltaWing DWC13	Élan (Mazda) 1.9 L Turbo I4	0	(Mexico) Memo Rojas	1–4, 6–7, 9, 11–12
(United States) DeltaWing Racing Cars with Claro/TracFone	DeltaWing DWC13	Élan (Mazda) 1.9 L Turbo I4	0	(United Kingdom) Andy Meyrick	1–2, 12
(United States) DeltaWing Racing Cars with Claro/TracFone	DeltaWing DWC13	Élan (Mazda) 1.9 L Turbo I4	0	(Colombia) Gabby Chaves	1
(United States) Tequila Patrón ESM	HPD ARX-04b 1 HPD ARX-03b 2	Honda HR28TT 2.8 L Turbo V6	1	(United States) Scott Sharp	1–2
(United States) Tequila Patrón ESM	HPD ARX-04b 1 HPD ARX-03b 2	Honda HR28TT 2.8 L Turbo V6	1	(United Kingdom) Ryan Dalziel	1–2
(United States) Tequila Patrón ESM	HPD ARX-04b 1 HPD ARX-03b 2	Honda HR28TT 2.8 L Turbo V6	1	(Denmark) David Heinemeier Hansson	1–2
(United States) Tequila Patrón ESM	HPD ARX-04b 1 HPD ARX-03b 2	Honda HR28TT 2.8 L Turbo V6	2	(United States) Ed Brown	1–2
(United States) Tequila Patrón ESM	HPD ARX-04b 1 HPD ARX-03b 2	Honda HR28TT 2.8 L Turbo V6	2	(United States) Jon Fogarty	1–2
(United States) Tequila Patrón ESM	HPD ARX-04b 1 HPD ARX-03b 2	Honda HR28TT 2.8 L Turbo V6	2	(United States) Johannes van Overbeek	1–2
(United States) Action Express Racing	Coyote Corvette DP	Chevrolet 5.5 L V8	5	(Portugal) João Barbosa	All
(United States) Action Express Racing	Coyote Corvette DP	Chevrolet 5.5 L V8	5	(Brazil) Christian Fittipaldi	All
(United States) Action Express Racing	Coyote Corvette DP	Chevrolet 5.5 L V8	5	(France) Sébastien Bourdais	1–2, 12
(United States) Action Express Racing	Coyote Corvette DP	Chevrolet 5.5 L V8	5	(Italy) Max Papis	6
(United States) Action Express Racing	Coyote Corvette DP	Chevrolet 5.5 L V8	31	(United States) Dane Cameron	All
(United States) Action Express Racing	Coyote Corvette DP	Chevrolet 5.5 L V8	31	(United States) Eric Curran	All
(United States) Action Express Racing	Coyote Corvette DP	Chevrolet 5.5 L V8	31	(Italy) Max Papis	1–2, 6, 12
(United States) Action Express Racing	Coyote Corvette DP	Chevrolet 5.5 L V8	31	(United Kingdom) Phil Keen	1
(United States) Starworks Motorsport	Riley Mk XXVI DP	Dinan (BMW) 5.0 L V8	7	(Brazil) Rubens Barrichello	1
(United States) Starworks Motorsport	Riley Mk XXVI DP	Dinan (BMW) 5.0 L V8	7	(Thailand) Tor Graves	1
(United States) Starworks Motorsport	Riley Mk XXVI DP	Dinan (BMW) 5.0 L V8	7	(New Zealand) Brendon Hartley	1
(United States) Starworks Motorsport	Riley Mk XXVI DP	Dinan (BMW) 5.0 L V8	7	(United States) Ryan Hunter-Reay	1
(United States) Starworks Motorsport	Riley Mk XXVI DP	Dinan (BMW) 5.0 L V8	7	(United States) Scott Mayer	1
(United States) Wayne Taylor Racing	Dallara Corvette DP	Chevrolet 5.5 L V8	10	(United States) Jordan Taylor	All
(United States) Wayne Taylor Racing	Dallara Corvette DP	Chevrolet 5.5 L V8	10	(United States) Ricky Taylor	All
(United States) Wayne Taylor Racing	Dallara Corvette DP	Chevrolet 5.5 L V8	10	(Italy) Max Angelelli	1–2, 6, 12
(United States) Fifty Plus Racing (Highway to Help)	Riley Mk XXVI DP	Dinan (BMW) 5.0 L V8	50	(United States) Byron DeFoor	1–2
(United States) Fifty Plus Racing (Highway to Help)	Riley Mk XXVI DP	Dinan (BMW) 5.0 L V8	50	(United Kingdom) David Hinton	1–2
(United States) Fifty Plus Racing (Highway to Help)	Riley Mk XXVI DP	Dinan (BMW) 5.0 L V8	50	(United States) Jim Pace	1–2
(United States) Fifty Plus Racing (Highway to Help)	Riley Mk XXVI DP	Dinan (BMW) 5.0 L V8	50	(United States) Dorsey Schroeder	1–2
(United States) Fifty Plus Racing (Highway to Help)	Riley Mk XXVI DP	Dinan (BMW) 5.0 L V8	50	(United States) Doug Smith	1
(United States) Krohn Racing	Ligier JS P2	Judd HK 3.6 L V8	57	(United States) Tracy Krohn	1–2
(United States) Krohn Racing	Ligier JS P2	Judd HK 3.6 L V8	57	(Sweden) Niclas Jönsson	1–2
(United States) Krohn Racing	Ligier JS P2	Judd HK 3.6 L V8	57	(France) Olivier Pla	1–2
(United States) Krohn Racing	Ligier JS P2	Judd HK 3.6 L V8	57	(United Kingdom) Alex Brundle	1
(United States) Michael Shank Racing with Curb/Agajanian	Ligier JS P2	Honda HR28TT 2.8 L Turbo V6	60	(Brazil) Oswaldo Negri Jr.	All
(United States) Michael Shank Racing with Curb/Agajanian	Ligier JS P2	Honda HR28TT 2.8 L Turbo V6	60	(United States) John Pew	All
(United States) Michael Shank Racing with Curb/Agajanian	Ligier JS P2	Honda HR28TT 2.8 L Turbo V6	60	(United States) Matt McMurry	1, 12
(United States) Michael Shank Racing with Curb/Agajanian	Ligier JS P2	Honda HR28TT 2.8 L Turbo V6	60	(United States) A. J. Allmendinger	1
(United States) Michael Shank Racing with Curb/Agajanian	Ligier JS P2	Honda HR28TT 2.8 L Turbo V6	60	(United Kingdom) Justin Wilson	2
(United States) RG Racing	Riley Mk XXVI DP	Dinan (BMW) 5.0 L V8	66	(United States) David Cheng	1
(United States) RG Racing	Riley Mk XXVI DP	Dinan (BMW) 5.0 L V8	66	(United States) Robert Gewirtz	1
(United States) RG Racing	Riley Mk XXVI DP	Dinan (BMW) 5.0 L V8	66	(United States) Mark Kvamme	1
(United States) RG Racing	Riley Mk XXVI DP	Dinan (BMW) 5.0 L V8	66	(United States) Shane Lewis	1
(United States) SpeedSource	Lola B12/80 Mazda	Mazda SKYACTIV-D (SH-VPTS) 2.2 L Turbo I4 (diesel)	70	(United States) Jonathan Bomarito	1–4, 11–12
(United States) SpeedSource	Lola B12/80 Mazda	Mazda SKYACTIV-D (SH-VPTS) 2.2 L Turbo I4 (diesel)	70	(United States) Tristan Nunez	1–4, 11–12
(United States) SpeedSource	Lola B12/80 Mazda	Mazda SKYACTIV-D (SH-VPTS) 2.2 L Turbo I4 (diesel)	70	(Canada) Sylvain Tremblay	1–2, 12
(United States) SpeedSource	Lola B12/80 Mazda	Mazda SKYACTIV-D (SH-VPTS) 2.2 L Turbo I4 (diesel)	70	(Canada) James Hinchcliffe	1
(United States) SpeedSource	Lola B12/80 Mazda	Mazda SKYACTIV-D (SH-VPTS) 2.2 L Turbo I4 (diesel)	07	(United States) Tom Long	All
(United States) SpeedSource	Lola B12/80 Mazda	Mazda SKYACTIV-D (SH-VPTS) 2.2 L Turbo I4 (diesel)	07	(United States) Joel Miller	All
(United States) SpeedSource	Lola B12/80 Mazda	Mazda SKYACTIV-D (SH-VPTS) 2.2 L Turbo I4 (diesel)	07	(United Kingdom) Ben Devlin	1–2, 6
(United States) SpeedSource	Lola B12/80 Mazda	Mazda SKYACTIV-D (SH-VPTS) 2.2 L Turbo I4 (diesel)	07	(Canada) Sylvain Tremblay	1–2
(United States) VisitFlorida.com Racing	Coyote Corvette DP	Chevrolet 5.5 L V8	90	(Canada) Michael Valiante	All
(United States) VisitFlorida.com Racing	Coyote Corvette DP	Chevrolet 5.5 L V8	90	(United Kingdom) Richard Westbrook	All
(United States) VisitFlorida.com Racing	Coyote Corvette DP	Chevrolet 5.5 L V8	90	(Germany) Mike Rockenfeller	1–2, 12
(United States) VisitFlorida.com Racing	Coyote Corvette DP	Chevrolet 5.5 L V8	90	(United States) Guy Cosmo	1
(United States) Chip Ganassi Racing	Ford EcoBoost Riley DP	Ford Ecoboost D35 3.5 L Turbo V6	01	(United States) Joey Hand	All
(United States) Chip Ganassi Racing	Ford EcoBoost Riley DP	Ford Ecoboost D35 3.5 L Turbo V6	01	(United States) Scott Pruett	All
(United States) Chip Ganassi Racing	Ford EcoBoost Riley DP	Ford Ecoboost D35 3.5 L Turbo V6	01	(United States) Sage Karam	1
(United States) Chip Ganassi Racing	Ford EcoBoost Riley DP	Ford Ecoboost D35 3.5 L Turbo V6	01	(United States) Charlie Kimball	1
(United States) Chip Ganassi Racing	Ford EcoBoost Riley DP	Ford Ecoboost D35 3.5 L Turbo V6	01	(New Zealand) Scott Dixon	2, 12
(United States) Chip Ganassi Racing	Ford EcoBoost Riley DP	Ford Ecoboost D35 3.5 L Turbo V6	02	(New Zealand) Scott Dixon	1
(United States) Chip Ganassi Racing	Ford EcoBoost Riley DP	Ford Ecoboost D35 3.5 L Turbo V6	02	(Brazil) Tony Kanaan	1
(United States) Chip Ganassi Racing	Ford EcoBoost Riley DP	Ford Ecoboost D35 3.5 L Turbo V6	02	(United States) Kyle Larson	1
(United States) Chip Ganassi Racing	Ford EcoBoost Riley DP	Ford Ecoboost D35 3.5 L Turbo V6	02	(United States) Jamie McMurray	1

=== Prototype Challenge ===
All entries use an Oreca FLM09 chassis powered by a Chevrolet LS3 6.2 L V8.

Team	No.	Drivers	Rounds
(United States) Starworks Motorsport	8	(Netherlands) Renger van der Zande	All
(United States) Starworks Motorsport	8	(Germany) Mirco Schultis	1–2, 4–5, 7–9, 12
(United States) Starworks Motorsport	8	(Venezuela) Alex Popow	1–2, 6, 12
(United States) Starworks Motorsport	8	(United States) Mike Hedlund	1, 6, 11–12
(United States) Starworks Motorsport	8	(Portugal) Filipe Albuquerque	1
(United States) Starworks Motorsport	88	(Venezuela) Alex Popow	11–12
(United States) Starworks Motorsport	88	(United States) Sean Rayhall	11–12
(United States) Starworks Motorsport	88	(United States) John Falb	12
(United States) RSR Racing	11	(Canada) Chris Cumming	All
(United States) RSR Racing	11	(Brazil) Bruno Junqueira	All
(United States) RSR Racing	11	(United States) Gustavo Menezes	1–2, 12
(United States) RSR Racing	11	(United Kingdom) Jack Hawksworth	1, 12
(United States) BAR1 Motorsports	16	(United States) Tomy Drissi	1–2, 12
(United States) BAR1 Motorsports	16	(United Kingdom) Martin Plowman	1–2, 6
(United States) BAR1 Motorsports	16	(United Kingdom) Johnny Mowlem	1, 12
(United States) BAR1 Motorsports	16	(United States) Brian Alder	1
(United States) BAR1 Motorsports	16	(United States) Tom Papadopoulos	1
(United States) BAR1 Motorsports	16	(United States) Marc Drumwright	2, 12
(United States) BAR1 Motorsports	16	(United States) David Cheng	2
(United States) BAR1 Motorsports	16	(United States) John Falb	4, 7, 11
(United States) BAR1 Motorsports	16	(United States) Todd Slusher	4, 8, 11
(United States) BAR1 Motorsports	16	(Canada) Daniel Burkett	6, 9
(United States) BAR1 Motorsports	16	(United States) Matt McMurry	6, 9
(United States) BAR1 Motorsports	16	(United States) Sean Rayhall	7–8
(United States) BAR1 Motorsports	16	(United States) Don Yount	12
(United States) BAR1 Motorsports	61	(United States) Shelby Blackstock	1
(United States) BAR1 Motorsports	61	(Netherlands) Ivo Breukers	1
(United States) BAR1 Motorsports	61	(United States) Marc Drumwright	1
(United States) BAR1 Motorsports	61	(United Kingdom) Martin Plowman	1
(United States) BAR1 Motorsports	61	(Canada) Remo Ruscitti	1
(United States) BAR1 Motorsports	61	(United Kingdom) Ryan Lewis	11
(United States) BAR1 Motorsports	61	(United States) Don Yount	11
(United States) Performance Tech Motorsports	38	(United States) James French	All
(United States) Performance Tech Motorsports	38	(United States) Jerome Mee	1–2, 6, 12
(United States) Performance Tech Motorsports	38	(Canada) James Vance	1, 5
(United States) Performance Tech Motorsports	38	(United States) Sean Johnston	1
(United States) Performance Tech Motorsports	38	(United States) Conor Daly	2, 6–9, 11–12
(United States) Performance Tech Motorsports	38	(United States) Mike Hedlund	4
(United States) PR1/Mathiasen Motorsports	52	(United States) Mike Guasch	All
(United States) PR1/Mathiasen Motorsports	52	(United Kingdom) Tom Kimber-Smith	All
(United States) PR1/Mathiasen Motorsports	52	(United States) Andrew Palmer	1–2, 6, 12
(United States) PR1/Mathiasen Motorsports	52	(United States) Andrew Novich	1
(United States) CORE Autosport	54	(United States) Jon Bennett	All
(United States) CORE Autosport	54	(United States) Colin Braun	All
(United States) CORE Autosport	54	(United States) James Gue	1–2, 6
(United States) CORE Autosport	54	(Canada) Mark Wilkins	1
(United States) CORE Autosport	54	(United States) Anthony Lazzaro	12
(United States) JDC-Miller MotorSports	85	(Canada) Mikhail Goikhberg	All
(United States) JDC-Miller MotorSports	85	(United States) Chris Miller	1–2, 6, 9, 12
(United States) JDC-Miller MotorSports	85	(United States) Rusty Mitchell	1–2, 6, 12
(United States) JDC-Miller MotorSports	85	(South Africa) Stephen Simpson	1, 5, 8
(United States) JDC-Miller MotorSports	85	(France) Tristan Vautier	1
(United States) JDC-Miller MotorSports	85	(United States) Gerry Kraut	2
(United States) JDC-Miller MotorSports	85	(United States) Zach Veach	4
(United States) JDC-Miller MotorSports	85	(United States) Matt McMurry	7, 11

=== GT Le Mans ===
Team	Chassis	Engine	Tyres	No.	Drivers	Rounds
(United States) Corvette Racing	Chevrolet Corvette C7.R	Chevrolet LT5.5R 5.5 L V8	M	3	(Spain) Antonio García	All
(United States) Corvette Racing	Chevrolet Corvette C7.R	Chevrolet LT5.5R 5.5 L V8	M	3	(Denmark) Jan Magnussen	All
(United States) Corvette Racing	Chevrolet Corvette C7.R	Chevrolet LT5.5R 5.5 L V8	M	3	(Australia) Ryan Briscoe	1–2, 12
(United States) Corvette Racing	Chevrolet Corvette C7.R	Chevrolet LT5.5R 5.5 L V8	M	4	(United Kingdom) Oliver Gavin	All
(United States) Corvette Racing	Chevrolet Corvette C7.R	Chevrolet LT5.5R 5.5 L V8	M	4	(United States) Tommy Milner	All
(United States) Corvette Racing	Chevrolet Corvette C7.R	Chevrolet LT5.5R 5.5 L V8	M	4	(France) Simon Pagenaud	1–2
(United States) Corvette Racing	Chevrolet Corvette C7.R	Chevrolet LT5.5R 5.5 L V8	M	4	(Australia) Ryan Briscoe	12
(Germany) Team Falken Tire	Porsche 911 RSR	Porsche 4.0 L Flat-6	F	17	(Germany) Wolf Henzler	All
(Germany) Team Falken Tire	Porsche 911 RSR	Porsche 4.0 L Flat-6	F	17	(United States) Bryan Sellers	All
(Germany) Team Falken Tire	Porsche 911 RSR	Porsche 4.0 L Flat-6	F	17	(United States) Patrick Long	1–2, 12
(United States) BMW Team RLL	BMW Z4 GTE	BMW P65B44 4.4 L V8	M	24	(United States) John Edwards	All
(United States) BMW Team RLL	BMW Z4 GTE	BMW P65B44 4.4 L V8	M	24	(Germany) Lucas Luhr	All
(United States) BMW Team RLL	BMW Z4 GTE	BMW P65B44 4.4 L V8	M	24	(Germany) Jens Klingmann	1–2, 12
(United States) BMW Team RLL	BMW Z4 GTE	BMW P65B44 4.4 L V8	M	24	(United States) Graham Rahal	1
(United States) BMW Team RLL	BMW Z4 GTE	BMW P65B44 4.4 L V8	M	25	(United States) Bill Auberlen	All
(United States) BMW Team RLL	BMW Z4 GTE	BMW P65B44 4.4 L V8	M	25	(Germany) Dirk Werner	All
(United States) BMW Team RLL	BMW Z4 GTE	BMW P65B44 4.4 L V8	M	25	(Brazil) Augusto Farfus	1–2, 12
(United States) BMW Team RLL	BMW Z4 GTE	BMW P65B44 4.4 L V8	M	25	(Canada) Bruno Spengler	1
(Italy) AF Corse	Ferrari 458 Italia GT2	Ferrari F136 4.5 L V8	M	51	(Italy) Gianmaria Bruni	1
(Italy) AF Corse	Ferrari 458 Italia GT2	Ferrari F136 4.5 L V8	M	51	(France) Emmanuel Collard	1
(Italy) AF Corse	Ferrari 458 Italia GT2	Ferrari F136 4.5 L V8	M	51	(France) François Perrodo	1
(Italy) AF Corse	Ferrari 458 Italia GT2	Ferrari F136 4.5 L V8	M	51	(Finland) Toni Vilander	1
(United States) Risi Competizione	Ferrari 458 Italia GT2	Ferrari F136 4.5 L V8	M	62	(Italy) Giancarlo Fisichella	All
(United States) Risi Competizione	Ferrari 458 Italia GT2	Ferrari F136 4.5 L V8	M	62	(Germany) Pierre Kaffer	All
(United States) Risi Competizione	Ferrari 458 Italia GT2	Ferrari F136 4.5 L V8	M	62	(Monaco) Olivier Beretta	1
(United States) Risi Competizione	Ferrari 458 Italia GT2	Ferrari F136 4.5 L V8	M	62	(Italy) Davide Rigon	1
(United States) Risi Competizione	Ferrari 458 Italia GT2	Ferrari F136 4.5 L V8	M	62	(Italy) Andrea Bertolini	2
(United States) Risi Competizione	Ferrari 458 Italia GT2	Ferrari F136 4.5 L V8	M	62	(Finland) Toni Vilander	12
(United Kingdom) Aston Martin Racing	Aston Martin Vantage GTE	Aston Martin AM05 4.5 L V8	M	98	(Canada) Paul Dalla Lana	1–2
(United Kingdom) Aston Martin Racing	Aston Martin Vantage GTE	Aston Martin AM05 4.5 L V8	M	98	(Portugal) Pedro Lamy	1–2
(United Kingdom) Aston Martin Racing	Aston Martin Vantage GTE	Aston Martin AM05 4.5 L V8	M	98	(Austria) Mathias Lauda	1–2
(United Kingdom) Aston Martin Racing	Aston Martin Vantage GTE	Aston Martin AM05 4.5 L V8	M	98	(United Kingdom) Darren Turner	1–2
(United Kingdom) Aston Martin Racing	Aston Martin Vantage GTE	Aston Martin AM05 4.5 L V8	M	98	(Germany) Stefan Mücke	1
(United States) Porsche North America	Porsche 911 RSR	Porsche 4.0 L Flat-6	M	911	(France) Patrick Pilet	All
(United States) Porsche North America	Porsche 911 RSR	Porsche 4.0 L Flat-6	M	911	(United Kingdom) Nick Tandy	1–2, 6–7, 9–12
(United States) Porsche North America	Porsche 911 RSR	Porsche 4.0 L Flat-6	M	911	(Denmark) Michael Christensen	1, 4
(United States) Porsche North America	Porsche 911 RSR	Porsche 4.0 L Flat-6	M	911	(Germany) Marc Lieb	1
(United States) Porsche North America	Porsche 911 RSR	Porsche 4.0 L Flat-6	M	911	(New Zealand) Earl Bamber	2, 6
(United States) Porsche North America	Porsche 911 RSR	Porsche 4.0 L Flat-6	M	911	(Austria) Richard Lietz	2, 12
(United States) Porsche North America	Porsche 911 RSR	Porsche 4.0 L Flat-6	M	911	(France) Frédéric Makowiecki	3
(United States) Porsche North America	Porsche 911 RSR	Porsche 4.0 L Flat-6	M	912	(Germany) Jörg Bergmeister	All
(United States) Porsche North America	Porsche 911 RSR	Porsche 4.0 L Flat-6	M	912	(New Zealand) Earl Bamber	1–2, 6–7, 9–12
(United States) Porsche North America	Porsche 911 RSR	Porsche 4.0 L Flat-6	M	912	(France) Frédéric Makowiecki	1–2, 12
(United States) Porsche North America	Porsche 911 RSR	Porsche 4.0 L Flat-6	M	912	(Denmark) Michael Christensen	1, 4
(United States) Porsche North America	Porsche 911 RSR	Porsche 4.0 L Flat-6	M	912	(United Kingdom) Nick Tandy	2, 6
(United States) Porsche North America	Porsche 911 RSR	Porsche 4.0 L Flat-6	M	912	(Austria) Richard Lietz	3

=== GT Daytona ===
Team	Chassis	Engine	No.	Drivers	Rounds
(Belgium) Mühlner Motorsports America	Porsche 911 GT America	Porsche 4.0 L Flat-6	18	(Germany) Marc Basseng	1
(Belgium) Mühlner Motorsports America	Porsche 911 GT America	Porsche 4.0 L Flat-6	18	(Italy) Matteo Beretta	1
(Belgium) Mühlner Motorsports America	Porsche 911 GT America	Porsche 4.0 L Flat-6	18	(United States) Connor De Phillippi	1
(Belgium) Mühlner Motorsports America	Porsche 911 GT America	Porsche 4.0 L Flat-6	18	(Austria) Nikolaus Mayr-Melnhof	1
(Belgium) Mühlner Motorsports America	Porsche 911 GT America	Porsche 4.0 L Flat-6	18	(Hong Kong) Darryl O'Young	1
(Belgium) Mühlner Motorsports America	Porsche 911 GT America	Porsche 4.0 L Flat-6	19	(United States) Connor De Phillippi	1
(Belgium) Mühlner Motorsports America	Porsche 911 GT America	Porsche 4.0 L Flat-6	19	(Peru) Ricardo Flores Jr.	1
(Belgium) Mühlner Motorsports America	Porsche 911 GT America	Porsche 4.0 L Flat-6	19	(United States) Michael Lira	1
(Belgium) Mühlner Motorsports America	Porsche 911 GT America	Porsche 4.0 L Flat-6	19	(Austria) Nikolaus Mayr-Melnhof	1
(Belgium) Mühlner Motorsports America	Porsche 911 GT America	Porsche 4.0 L Flat-6	19	(United States) Jim Michaelian	1
(United States) / Alex Job Racing (Note: 1. 22 entered as Alex Job Racing and #23 entered as Team Seattle / Alex Job Racing.); (United States) / Team Seattle / Alex Job Racing	Porsche 911 GT America	Porsche 4.0 L Flat-6	22	(United States) Leh Keen	All
(United States) / Alex Job Racing; (United States) / Team Seattle / Alex Job Racing	Porsche 911 GT America	Porsche 4.0 L Flat-6	22	(United States) Cooper MacNeil	All
(United States) / Alex Job Racing; (United States) / Team Seattle / Alex Job Racing	Porsche 911 GT America	Porsche 4.0 L Flat-6	22	(United States) Andrew Davis	1–2, 6, 12
(United States) / Alex Job Racing; (United States) / Team Seattle / Alex Job Racing	Porsche 911 GT America	Porsche 4.0 L Flat-6	22	(New Zealand) Shane van Gisbergen	1
(United States) / Alex Job Racing; (United States) / Team Seattle / Alex Job Racing	Porsche 911 GT America	Porsche 4.0 L Flat-6	23	(Germany) Mario Farnbacher	All
(United States) / Alex Job Racing; (United States) / Team Seattle / Alex Job Racing	Porsche 911 GT America	Porsche 4.0 L Flat-6	23	(United Kingdom) Ian James	All
(United States) / Alex Job Racing; (United States) / Team Seattle / Alex Job Racing	Porsche 911 GT America	Porsche 4.0 L Flat-6	23	(Spain) Alex Riberas	1–2, 12
(Austria) Konrad Motorsport	Porsche 911 GT America	Porsche 4.0 L Flat-6	28	(Austria) Klaus Bachler	1
(Austria) Konrad Motorsport	Porsche 911 GT America	Porsche 4.0 L Flat-6	28	(Germany) Christian Engelhart	1
(Austria) Konrad Motorsport	Porsche 911 GT America	Porsche 4.0 L Flat-6	28	(Switzerland) Rolf Ineichen	1
(Austria) Konrad Motorsport	Porsche 911 GT America	Porsche 4.0 L Flat-6	28	(United States) Lance Willsey	1
(Austria) Konrad Motorsport	Porsche 911 GT America	Porsche 4.0 L Flat-6	28	(Austria) Christopher Zöchling	1
(United States) Riley Motorsports	Dodge Viper GT3-R	Dodge 8.3 L V10	33	(Netherlands) Jeroen Bleekemolen	All
(United States) Riley Motorsports	Dodge Viper GT3-R	Dodge 8.3 L V10	33	(United States) Ben Keating	All
(United States) Riley Motorsports	Dodge Viper GT3-R	Dodge 8.3 L V10	33	(Netherlands) Sebastiaan Bleekemolen	1–2, 12
(United States) Riley Motorsports	Dodge Viper GT3-R	Dodge 8.3 L V10	33	(United States) Al Carter	1
(United States) Riley Motorsports	Dodge Viper GT3-R	Dodge 8.3 L V10	33	(Belgium) Marc Goossens	1
(United States) Riley Motorsports	Dodge Viper GT3-R	Dodge 8.3 L V10	93	(United States) Al Carter	1–2, 6, 12
(United States) Riley Motorsports	Dodge Viper GT3-R	Dodge 8.3 L V10	93	(United States) Cameron Lawrence	1–2, 6, 12
(United States) Riley Motorsports	Dodge Viper GT3-R	Dodge 8.3 L V10	93	(United States) Ben Keating	1–2
(United States) Riley Motorsports	Dodge Viper GT3-R	Dodge 8.3 L V10	93	(Germany) Dominik Farnbacher	1
(United States) Riley Motorsports	Dodge Viper GT3-R	Dodge 8.3 L V10	93	(Canada) Kuno Wittmer	1
(United States) Riley Motorsports	Dodge Viper GT3-R	Dodge 8.3 L V10	93	(Belgium) Marc Goossens	2, 6, 12
(United States) Riley Motorsports	Dodge Viper GT3-R	Dodge 8.3 L V10	93	(United States) Marc Miller	4
(United States) Riley Motorsports	Dodge Viper GT3-R	Dodge 8.3 L V10	93	(United States) Jeff Mosing	4
(United States) Magnus Racing	Porsche 911 GT America	Porsche 4.0 L Flat-6	44	(United States) Andy Lally	All
(United States) Magnus Racing	Porsche 911 GT America	Porsche 4.0 L Flat-6	44	(United States) John Potter	All
(United States) Magnus Racing	Porsche 911 GT America	Porsche 4.0 L Flat-6	44	(Germany) Marco Seefried	1–2, 6
(United States) Magnus Racing	Porsche 911 GT America	Porsche 4.0 L Flat-6	44	(Austria) Martin Ragginger	1
(United States) Magnus Racing	Porsche 911 GT America	Porsche 4.0 L Flat-6	44	(Germany) Robert Renauer	12
(United States) Flying Lizard Motorsports	Audi R8 LMS ultra	Audi 5.2 L V10	45	(United States) Robert Thorne	1–2, 12
(United States) Flying Lizard Motorsports	Audi R8 LMS ultra	Audi 5.2 L V10	45	(Japan) Tomonobu Fujii	1
(United States) Flying Lizard Motorsports	Audi R8 LMS ultra	Audi 5.2 L V10	45	(Japan) Satoshi Hoshino	1
(United States) Flying Lizard Motorsports	Audi R8 LMS ultra	Audi 5.2 L V10	45	(Germany) Markus Winkelhock	1
(United States) Flying Lizard Motorsports	Audi R8 LMS ultra	Audi 5.2 L V10	45	(United States) Colin Thompson	2, 12
(United States) Flying Lizard Motorsports	Audi R8 LMS ultra	Audi 5.2 L V10	45	(Germany) Marco Holzer	2
(United States) Flying Lizard Motorsports	Audi R8 LMS ultra	Audi 5.2 L V10	45	(United States) Guy Cosmo	4, 12
(United States) Flying Lizard Motorsports	Audi R8 LMS ultra	Audi 5.2 L V10	45	(United States) Patrick Byrne	4
(United States) Flying Lizard Motorsports	Audi R8 LMS ultra	Audi 5.2 L V10	45	(United States) Jason Hart	11
(United States) Flying Lizard Motorsports	Audi R8 LMS ultra	Audi 5.2 L V10	45	(United States) Mike Vess	11
(United States) Paul Miller Racing	Audi R8 LMS ultra	Audi 5.2 L V10	48	(Germany) Christopher Haase	All
(United States) Paul Miller Racing	Audi R8 LMS ultra	Audi 5.2 L V10	48	(South Africa) Dion von Moltke	All
(United States) Paul Miller Racing	Audi R8 LMS ultra	Audi 5.2 L V10	48	(United States) Bryce Miller	1–2, 6, 12
(United States) Paul Miller Racing	Audi R8 LMS ultra	Audi 5.2 L V10	48	(Germany) René Rast	1
(Italy) AF Corse	Ferrari 458 Italia GT3	Ferrari F136 4.5 L V8	49	(Portugal) Rui Águas	1–2
(Italy) AF Corse	Ferrari 458 Italia GT3	Ferrari F136 4.5 L V8	49	(Republic of Ireland) Matt Griffin	1
(Italy) AF Corse	Ferrari 458 Italia GT3	Ferrari F136 4.5 L V8	49	(Thailand) Pasin Lathouras	1
(Italy) AF Corse	Ferrari 458 Italia GT3	Ferrari F136 4.5 L V8	49	(Italy) Michele Rugolo	1
(Italy) AF Corse	Ferrari 458 Italia GT3	Ferrari F136 4.5 L V8	49	(Italy) Marco Cioci	2
(Italy) AF Corse	Ferrari 458 Italia GT3	Ferrari F136 4.5 L V8	49	(Italy) Piergiuseppe Perazzini	2
(Italy) AF Corse	Ferrari 458 Italia GT3	Ferrari F136 4.5 L V8	49	(Venezuela) Enzo Potolicchio	2
(United States) Wright Motorsports	Porsche 911 GT America	Porsche 4.0 L Flat-6	58	(Belgium) Jan Heylen	1–2, 5–6
(United States) Wright Motorsports	Porsche 911 GT America	Porsche 4.0 L Flat-6	58	(United States) Madison Snow	1–2, 5–6
(United States) Wright Motorsports	Porsche 911 GT America	Porsche 4.0 L Flat-6	58	(United States) Patrick Dempsey	1
(United States) Wright Motorsports	Porsche 911 GT America	Porsche 4.0 L Flat-6	58	(Austria) Philipp Eng	1
(United States) Wright Motorsports	Porsche 911 GT America	Porsche 4.0 L Flat-6	58	(Costa Rica) Emilio Valverde	2
(United States) Scuderia Corsa	Ferrari 458 Italia GT3	Ferrari F136 4.5 L V8	63	(United States) Townsend Bell	All
(United States) Scuderia Corsa	Ferrari 458 Italia GT3	Ferrari F136 4.5 L V8	63	(United States) Bill Sweedler	All
(United States) Scuderia Corsa	Ferrari 458 Italia GT3	Ferrari F136 4.5 L V8	63	(United States) Anthony Lazzaro	1–2
(United States) Scuderia Corsa	Ferrari 458 Italia GT3	Ferrari F136 4.5 L V8	63	(United States) Jeff Segal	1, 12
(United States) Scuderia Corsa	Ferrari 458 Italia GT3	Ferrari F136 4.5 L V8	63	(United States) Jeff Westphal	1
(United States) Scuderia Corsa	Ferrari 458 Italia GT3	Ferrari F136 4.5 L V8	64	(Brazil) Daniel Serra	1, 12
(United States) Scuderia Corsa	Ferrari 458 Italia GT3	Ferrari F136 4.5 L V8	64	(Italy) Andrea Bertolini	1
(United States) Scuderia Corsa	Ferrari 458 Italia GT3	Ferrari F136 4.5 L V8	64	(Brazil) Marcos Gomes	1
(United States) Scuderia Corsa	Ferrari 458 Italia GT3	Ferrari F136 4.5 L V8	64	(Brazil) Francisco Longo	1
(United States) Scuderia Corsa	Ferrari 458 Italia GT3	Ferrari F136 4.5 L V8	64	(Italy) Matteo Cressoni	12
(United States) Scuderia Corsa	Ferrari 458 Italia GT3	Ferrari F136 4.5 L V8	64	(United States) Jeff Westphal	12
(United States) Park Place Motorsports	Porsche 911 GT America	Porsche 4.0 L Flat-6	73	(United States) Patrick Lindsey	All
(United States) Park Place Motorsports	Porsche 911 GT America	Porsche 4.0 L Flat-6	73	(United States) Spencer Pumpelly	All
(United States) Park Place Motorsports	Porsche 911 GT America	Porsche 4.0 L Flat-6	73	(United States) Jim Norman	1–2
(United States) Park Place Motorsports	Porsche 911 GT America	Porsche 4.0 L Flat-6	73	(Venezuela) Nelson Canache Jr.	1
(United States) Park Place Motorsports	Porsche 911 GT America	Porsche 4.0 L Flat-6	73	(France) Kévin Estre	1
(United States) Park Place Motorsports	Porsche 911 GT America	Porsche 4.0 L Flat-6	73	(United States) Madison Snow	12
(Canada) Compass360 Racing	Audi R8 LMS ultra	Audi 5.2 L V10	76	(Brazil) Pierre Kleinubing	8–11
(Canada) Compass360 Racing	Audi R8 LMS ultra	Audi 5.2 L V10	76	(United States) Ray Mason	8–11
(United States) Lone Star Racing	Dodge Viper GT3-R	Dodge 8.3 L V10	80	(Belgium) Marc Goossens	11
(United States) Lone Star Racing	Dodge Viper GT3-R	Dodge 8.3 L V10	80	(United States) Dan Knox	11
(United States) GB Autosport	Porsche 911 GT America	Porsche 4.0 L Flat-6	81	(United States) Michael Avenatti	1–2
(United States) GB Autosport	Porsche 911 GT America	Porsche 4.0 L Flat-6	81	(Republic of Ireland) Damien Faulkner	1–2
(United States) GB Autosport	Porsche 911 GT America	Porsche 4.0 L Flat-6	81	(Poland) Kuba Giermaziak	1–2
(United States) GB Autosport	Porsche 911 GT America	Porsche 4.0 L Flat-6	81	(United States) Mike Skeen	1–2
(United States) GB Autosport	Porsche 911 GT America	Porsche 4.0 L Flat-6	81	(United Kingdom) Rory Butcher	1
(United States) Turner Motorsport	BMW Z4 GT3	BMW P65B44 4.4 L V8	97	(United States) Michael Marsal	All
(United States) Turner Motorsport	BMW Z4 GT3	BMW P65B44 4.4 L V8	97	(Finland) Markus Palttala	1–2, 4–6, 9–12
(United States) Turner Motorsport	BMW Z4 GT3	BMW P65B44 4.4 L V8	97	(United Kingdom) Andy Priaulx	1–2, 12
(United States) Turner Motorsport	BMW Z4 GT3	BMW P65B44 4.4 L V8	97	(United States) Boris Said	1–2
(United States) Turner Motorsport	BMW Z4 GT3	BMW P65B44 4.4 L V8	97	(United States) Dane Cameron	8
(United States) Turner Motorsport	BMW Z4 GT3	BMW P65B44 4.4 L V8	97	(United States) Billy Johnson	12
(United States) TRG-AMR North America	Aston Martin V12 Vantage GT3	Aston Martin 6.0 L V12	007	(Denmark) Christina Nielsen	All
(United States) TRG-AMR North America	Aston Martin V12 Vantage GT3	Aston Martin 6.0 L V12	007	(Australia) James Davison	1–2, 4–5
(United States) TRG-AMR North America	Aston Martin V12 Vantage GT3	Aston Martin 6.0 L V12	007	(United States) Brandon Davis	1–2, 12
(United States) TRG-AMR North America	Aston Martin V12 Vantage GT3	Aston Martin 6.0 L V12	007	(Denmark) Christoffer Nygaard	1
(United States) TRG-AMR North America	Aston Martin V12 Vantage GT3	Aston Martin 6.0 L V12	007	(Canada) Kuno Wittmer	6, 8–12
(United States) TRG-AMR North America	Aston Martin V12 Vantage GT3	Aston Martin 6.0 L V12	009	(United States) Brandon Davis	1
(United States) TRG-AMR North America	Aston Martin V12 Vantage GT3	Aston Martin 6.0 L V12	009	(United States) Derek DeBoer	1
(United States) TRG-AMR North America	Aston Martin V12 Vantage GT3	Aston Martin 6.0 L V12	009	(Canada) Max Riddle	1
(United States) TRG-AMR North America	Aston Martin V12 Vantage GT3	Aston Martin 6.0 L V12	009	(Chile) Eliseo Salazar	1
(United States) TRG-AMR North America	Aston Martin V12 Vantage GT3	Aston Martin 6.0 L V12	009	(United States) Kris Wilson	1

== Results ==
Bold indicates overall winner.

Rnd	Circuit	Prototype Winning Team	PC Winning Team	GTLM Winning Team	GTD Winning Team	Report
Rnd	Circuit	Prototype Winning Drivers	PC Winning Drivers	GTLM Winning Drivers	GTD Winning Drivers	Report
1	Daytona	(United States) **No. 02 Chip Ganassi Racing**	(United States) No. 52 PR1/Mathiasen Motorsports	(United States) No. 3 Corvette Racing	(United States) No. 93 Riley Motorsports	Report
1	Daytona	(New Zealand) **Scott Dixon** **(Brazil) Tony Kanaan** **(United States) Kyle Larson** **(United States) Jamie McMurray**	(United States) Michael Guasch (United Kingdom) Tom Kimber-Smith (United States) Andrew Novich (United States) Andrew Palmer	(Australia) Ryan Briscoe (Spain) Antonio García (Denmark) Jan Magnussen	(United States) Al Carter (Germany) Dominik Farnbacher (United States) Ben Keating (United States) Cameron Lawrence (Canada) Kuno Wittmer	Report
2	Sebring	(United States) **No. 5 Action Express Racing**	(United States) No. 52 PR1/Mathiasen Motorsports	(United States) No. 3 Corvette Racing	(United States) No. 23 Team Seattle / Alex Job Racing	Report
2	Sebring	(Portugal) **João Barbosa** **(France) Sébastien Bourdais** **(Brazil) Christian Fittipaldi**	(United States) Michael Guasch (United Kingdom) Tom Kimber-Smith (United States) Andrew Palmer	(Australia) Ryan Briscoe (Spain) Antonio García (Denmark) Jan Magnussen	(Germany) Mario Farnbacher (United Kingdom) Ian James (Spain) Alex Riberas	Report
3	Long Beach	(United States) **No. 10 Wayne Taylor Racing**	did not participate	(United States) No. 25 BMW Team RLL	did not participate	Report
3	Long Beach	(United States) **Jordan Taylor** **(United States) Ricky Taylor**	did not participate	(United States) Bill Auberlen (Germany) Dirk Werner	did not participate	Report
4	Laguna Seca	(United States) **No. 90 VisitFlorida.com Racing**	(United States) No. 11 RSR Racing	(United States) No. 24 BMW Team RLL	(United States) No. 73 Park Place Motorsports	Report
4	Laguna Seca	(Canada) **Michael Valiante** **(United Kingdom) Richard Westbrook**	(Canada) Chris Cumming (Brazil) Bruno Junqueira	(United States) John Edwards (Germany) Lucas Luhr	(United States) Patrick Lindsey (United States) Spencer Pumpelly	Report
5	Belle Isle	(United States) **No. 31 Action Express Racing**	(United States) No. 8 Starworks Motorsport	did not participate	(United States) No. 23 Team Seattle / Alex Job Racing	Report
5	Belle Isle	(United States) **Dane Cameron** **(United States) Eric Curran**	(Germany) Mirco Schultis (Netherlands) Renger van der Zande	did not participate	(Germany) Mario Farnbacher (United Kingdom) Ian James	Report
6	Watkins Glen	(United States) **No. 90 VisitFlorida.com Racing**	(United States) No. 8 Starworks Motorsport	(United States) No. 17 Team Falken Racing	(United States) No. 93 Riley Motorsports	Report
6	Watkins Glen	(Canada) **Michael Valiante** **(United Kingdom) Richard Westbrook**	(United States) Mike Hedlund (Venezuela) Alex Popow (Netherlands) Renger van der Zande	(Germany) Wolf Henzler (United States) Bryan Sellers	(United States) Al Carter (Belgium) Marc Goossens (United States) Cameron Lawrence	Report
7	Mosport	(United States) **No. 10 Wayne Taylor Racing**	(United States) No. 54 CORE Autosport	(United States) No. 911 Porsche North America	did not participate	Report
7	Mosport	(United States) **Jordan Taylor** **(United States) Ricky Taylor**	(United States) Jon Bennett (United States) Colin Braun	(France) Patrick Pilet (United Kingdom) Nick Tandy	did not participate	Report
8	Lime Rock	did not participate	(United States) **No. 52 PR1/Mathiasen Motorsports**	did not participate	(United States) No. 97 Turner Motorsport	Report
8	Lime Rock	did not participate	(United States) **Michael Guasch** **(United Kingdom) Tom Kimber-Smith**	did not participate	(United States) Dane Cameron (United States) Michael Marsal	Report
9	Road America	(United States) **No. 31 Action Express Racing**	(United States) No. 11 RSR Racing	(United States) No. 911 Porsche North America	(United States) No. 33 Riley Motorsports	Report
9	Road America	(United States) **Dane Cameron** **(United States) Eric Curran**	(Canada) Chris Cumming (Brazil) Bruno Junqueira	(France) Patrick Pilet (United Kingdom) Nick Tandy	(Netherlands) Jeroen Bleekemolen (United States) Ben Keating	Report
10	Virginia	did not participate	did not participate	(United States) **No. 911 Porsche North America**	(United States) No. 63 Scuderia Corsa	Report
10	Virginia	did not participate	did not participate	(France) **Patrick Pilet** **(United Kingdom) Nick Tandy**	(United States) Townsend Bell (United States) Bill Sweedler	Report
11	Austin	(United States) **No. 01 Chip Ganassi Racing**	(United States) No. 54 CORE Autosport	(United States) No. 25 BMW Team RLL	(United States) No. 33 Riley Motorsports	Report
11	Austin	(United States) **Joey Hand** **(United States) Scott Pruett**	(United States) Jon Bennett (United States) Colin Braun	(United States) Bill Auberlen (Germany) Dirk Werner	(Netherlands) Jeroen Bleekemolen (United States) Ben Keating	Report
12	Road Atlanta	(United States) No. 5 Action Express Racing	(United States) No. 52 PR1/Mathiasen Motorsports	(United States) **No. 911 Porsche North America**	(United States) No. 73 Park Place Motorsports	Report
12	Road Atlanta	(Portugal) João Barbosa (France) Sébastien Bourdais (Brazil) Christian Fittipaldi	(United States) Michael Guasch (United Kingdom) Tom Kimber-Smith (United States) Andrew Palmer	(Austria) **Richard Lietz** **(France) Patrick Pilet** **(United Kingdom) Nick Tandy**	(United States) Patrick Lindsey (United States) Spencer Pumpelly (United States) Madison Snow	Report

== Championship standings ==
=== Points Systems ===
Championship points are awarded in each class at the finish of each event. Points are awarded based on finishing positions as shown in the chart below.

Position	1	2	3	4	5	6	7	8	9	10	11	12	13	14	15	16	17	18	19	20	21	22	23	24	25	26	27	28	29	30
Race	35	32	30	28	26	25	24	23	22	21	20	19	18	17	16	15	14	13	12	11	10	9	8	7	6	5	4	3	2	1

==== Drivers Points ====
Points are awarded in each class at the finish of each event. Drivers must complete a minimum driving time (outlined to teams prior to each event) in order to score points. A driver does not score points if the minimum drive time is not met.

In addition, for each car credited with a race start, each driver nominated in that car also receives one additional “starting point.”

==== Team Points ====
Team points are calculated in exactly the same way as driver points, using the point distribution chart and “starting points.” Each car entered is considered its own “team” regardless if it is a single entry or part of a two-car team.

==== Manufacturer Points ====
There are also a number of manufacturer championships which utilize the same season-long point distribution chart, minus the “starting points” used for the driver and team championships. (The “starting point” is not used in manufacturer championship points.) The manufacturer championships recognized by IMSA are as follows:

Prototype (P): Engine Manufacturer
GT Le Mans (GTLM): Car Manufacturer; Tire Manufacturer
GT Daytona (GTD): Car Manufacturer

Each manufacturer receives finishing points for its highest finishing car in each class. The positions of subsequent finishing cars from the same manufacturer are not taken into consideration, and all other manufacturers move up in the order.

Example: Manufacturer A finishes 1st and 2nd at an event, and Manufacturer B finishes 3rd. Manufacturer A receives 35 first-place points while Manufacturer B would earn 32 second-place points.

The points system from the 2014 season is the same as in 2015.

==== North American Endurance Cup ====
The points system for the North American Endurance Cup is different from the normal points system. Points are awarded on a 5-4-3-2 basis for drivers, teams and manufacturers. The first finishing position at each interval earns five points, four points for second position, three points for third, with two points awarded for fourth and each subsequent finishing position.

Position	1	2	3	Other Classified
Race	5	4	3	2

At Daytona (24 hour race), points are awarded at six hours, 12 hours, 18 hours and at the finish. At the Sebring (12 hour race), points are awarded at four hours, eight hours and at the finish. At Watkins Glen (6 hour race), points are awarded at three hours and at the finish. At Road Atlanta (10-hour race), points are awarded at four hours, eight hours and at the finish.

Like the season-long team championship, North American Endurance Cup team points are awarded for each car and drivers get points in any car that they drive, in which they are entered for points. The manufacturer points go to the highest placed car from that manufacturer (the others from that manufacturer not being counted), just like the season-long manufacturer championship.

For example: in any particular segment manufacturer A finishes 1st and 2nd and manufacturer B finishes 3rd. Manufacturer A only receives first-place points for that segment. Manufacturer B receives the second-place points.

=== Drivers' Championships ===
Race is part of the North American Endurance Cup

==== Prototype ====
Pos.	Driver	**DAY**	**SEB**	LBH	LGA	BEL	**WGL**	MOS	ELK	AUS	**ATL**	Points	NAEC
1	(Portugal) João Barbosa	2	1	5	4	3	3	5	2	6	1	309	**45**
1	(Brazil) Christian Fittipaldi	2	1	5	4	**3**	**3**	5	2	6	1	309	**45**
2	(Canada) Michael Valiante	3	3	3	1	5	1	4	5	3	5	306	31
2	(United Kingdom) Richard Westbrook	3	3	3	1	5	1	4	5	3	**5**	306	31
3	(United States) Dane Cameron	4	5	4	5	1	4	2	1	5	3	304	23
3	(United States) Eric Curran	4	5	4	5	1	4	2	1	5	3	304	23
4	(United States) Joey Hand	6	4	2	7	4	2	6	**3**	1	2	301	**35**
4	(United States) Scott Pruett	6	4	2	7	4	2	6	3	**1**	2	301	**35**
5	(United States) Jordan Taylor	16^{1}	2	1	**2**	6	6	1	8	2	4	292	33
5	(United States) Ricky Taylor	16^{1}	2	**1**	2	6	6	**1**	8	2	4	292	33
6	(Brazil) Oswaldo Negri Jr.	**5**	13	6	3	2	7	3	4	4	9	273	23
6	(United States) John Pew	5	13	6	3	2	7	3	4	4	9	273	23
7	(United States) Tom Long	11	11	7	9	7	5	7	7	9	6	241	22
7	(United States) Joel Miller	11	11	7	9	7	5	7	7	9	6	241	22
8	(United Kingdom) Katherine Legge	15	12	9	8		8	8	6	7	8	207	22
8	(Mexico) Memo Rojas	15	12	9	8		8	8	6	7	8	207	22
9	(United States) Jonathan Bomarito	12	10	8	6					8	7	141	18
9	(United States) Tristan Nunez	12	10	8	6					8	7	141	18
10	(Italy) Max Papis	4	5				4				3	116	23
11	(France) Sébastien Bourdais	2	1								1	105	**37**
12	(Italy) Max Angelelli	16^{1}	2				6				4	104	33
13	(New Zealand) Scott Dixon	1	4								2	98	32
14	(Germany) Mike Rockenfeller	3	3								5	89	24
15	(United Kingdom) Ben Devlin	11	11				5					69	18
16	(Canada) Sylvain Tremblay	12	10								7	67	18
17	(United Kingdom) Andy Meyrick	15	12								8	61	18
18	(United States) Matt McMurry	5									9	50	13
19	(United States) Byron DeFoor	8	7									49	14
19	(United Kingdom) David Hinton	8	7									49	14
19	(United States) Jim Pace	8	7									49	14
19	(United States) Dorsey Schroeder	8	7									49	14
20	(Sweden) Niclas Jönsson	13	6									45	14
20	(United States) Tracy Krohn	13	6									45	14
20	(France) Olivier Pla	13	**6**									45	14
21	(United Kingdom) Ryan Dalziel	10	9									45	14
21	(Denmark) David Heinemeier Hansson	10	9									45	14
21	(United States) Scott Sharp	10	9									45	14
22	(United States) Ed Brown	14	8									42	14
22	(United States) Jon Fogarty	14	8									42	14
22	(United States) Johannes van Overbeek	14	8									42	14
23	(Brazil) Tony Kanaan	1										36	16
23	(United States) Kyle Larson	1										36	16
23	(United States) Jamie McMurray	1										36	16
24	(United States) Guy Cosmo	3										31	9
25	(United Kingdom) Phil Keen	4										29	8
26	(United States) A. J. Allmendinger	5										27	9
27	(United States) Sage Karam	6										26	12
27	(United States) Charlie Kimball	6										26	12
28	(United States) David Cheng	7										25	8
28	(United States) Robert Gewirtz	7										25	8
28	(United States) Mark Kvamme	7										25	8
28	(United States) Shane Lewis	7										25	8
29	(United States) Doug Smith	8										24	8
30	(New Zealand) Brendon Hartley	9	WD^{2}									23	8
30	(United States) Scott Mayer	9	WD^{2}									23	8
30	(Brazil) Rubens Barrichello	9										23	8
30	(Thailand) Tor Graves	9										23	8
30	(United States) Ryan Hunter-Reay	9										23	8
31	(Canada) James Hinchcliffe	12										20	8
32	(United Kingdom) Alex Brundle	13										19	8
33	(United Kingdom) Justin Wilson		13									19	6
34	(Colombia) Gabby Chaves	15										17	8

Colour	Result
Gold	Winner
Silver	Second place
Bronze	Third place
Green	Points classification
Blue	Non-points classification
Blue	Non-classified finish (NC)
Purple	Retired, not classified (Ret)
Red	Did not qualify (DNQ)
Red	Did not pre-qualify (DNPQ)
Black	Disqualified (DSQ)
White	Did not start (DNS)
White	Withdrew (WD)
White	Race cancelled (C)
Blank	Did not practice (DNP)
Blank	Did not arrive (DNA)
Blank	Excluded (EX)

**Bold** - Pole position
Italics - Fastest lap

Notes

- ^{1} – All drivers of car #10 were moved to last in class at Daytona for exceeding maximum drive-time limitation.
- ^{2} – The #7 of Starworks Motorsport withdrew from the 12 Hours of Sebring before Practice with only Scott Mayer and Brendon Hartley confirmed as drivers.

==== Prototype Challenge ====
Pos.	Driver	**DAY**	**SEB**	LGA	BEL	**WGL**	MOS	LIM	ELK	AUS	**ATL**	Points	NAEC
1	(United States) Jon Bennett	2	2	2	4	**4**	1	4	3	1	4	318	**37**
1	(United States) Colin Braun	2	2	2	4	4	1	4	3	1	4	318	**37**
2	(United States) Mike Guasch	1	1	7	6	2	5	1	4	4	1	313	**46**
2	(United Kingdom) Tom Kimber-Smith	1	1	7	6	2	5	1	4	4	**1**	313	**46**
3	(Canada) Chris Cumming	4	6	**1**	5	6	4	2	1	**2**	6	301	24
3	(Brazil) Bruno Junqueira	4	6	1	5	6	4	2	1	2	6	301	24
4	(Canada) Mikhail Goikhberg	3	4	4	2	5	3	6	7	5	5	285	28
5	(Netherlands) Renger van der Zande	6^{1}	5	6	1	1	6	3	6	6	2	268	22
6	(United States) James French	7†	3	3	**3**	7	**7**	7	**2**	3	DNS	233	13
7	(Germany) Mirco Schultis	6^{1}	5	6	1		6	3	6		2	206	12
8	(United States) Conor Daly		3			7	7	7	2	3	DNS	170	13
9	(United States) Andrew Palmer	1	1			2					1	141	**46**
10	(United States) Mike Hedlund	6^{1}		3		1				6	2	127	16
11	(United States) Matt McMurry					3	3		5	5		116	7
12	(Venezuela) Alex Popow	6	5			1				DNS	7	115	30
13	(United States) Rusty Mitchell	3	4			5					5	114	28
14	(United States) Chris Miller	3	4^{4}			5			7		5	111	22
15	(United States) James Gue	2	2			4						95	**33**
16	(South Africa) Stephen Simpson	3			2			**6**				90	12
17	(United States) John Falb			5			2			DNS	7	85	4
18	(United States) Sean Rayhall						2	5		DNS	7	85	4
19	(Canada) Daniel Burkett					3			5			58	7
20	(United States) Jerome Mee	7†	3			7					DNS	57	13
21	(United States) Don Yount									7	3	56	7
22	(United States) Todd Slusher			5				5		DNS		54	-
23	(United States) Gustavo Menezes	4^{2}	6								6	53	12
24	(United States) Andrew Novich	1										36	15
25	(Canada) Mark Wilkins	2										33	19
26	(United States) Tomy Drissi	8^{3}	7†								3	33	7
27	(United Kingdom) Martin Plowman	5†	**7**†			3						33	7
28	(United States) Marc Drumwright	5†	7†								3	33	7
29	(United Kingdom) Johnny Mowlem	**8**^{3}									3	32	7
30	(Canada) James Vance	7†			3							32	0
31	(United States) Zach Veach			4								29	-
32	(United States) Anthony Lazzaro										4	29	4
33	(Portugal) Filipe Albuquerque	6										27	10
34	(United Kingdom) Ryan Lewis									7		25	-
35	(United Kingdom) Jack Hawksworth	4^{2}									6	1	0
36	(France) Tristan Vautier	3†										1	0
37	(United States) Brian Alder	8^{3}										1	0
37	(United States) Tom Papadopoulos	8^{3}										1	0
38	(United States) Shelby Blackstock	5†										1	0
38	(Netherlands) Ivo Breukers	5†										1	0
38	(Canada) Remo Ruscitti	5†										1	0
39	(United States) Sean Johnston	7†										1	0
40	(United States) Gerry Kraut		4^{4}									1	0
41	(United States) David Cheng		7†									1	0

Notes

- ^{1} – Three drivers of car #8, Mirco Schultis, Renger van der Zande and Mike Hedlund, only scored one point at Daytona for exceeding maximum drive-time limitation.
- ^{2} – Two drivers of car #11, Gustavo Menezes and Jack Hawksworth, only scored one point at Daytona for exceeding maximum drive-time limitation.
- ^{3} – All drivers of car #16 were moved to last in class and only scored one point at Daytona for exceeding maximum drive-time limitation.
- ^{4} – Two drivers of car #85, Chris Miller and Gerry Kraut, only scored one point at Sebring for exceeding maximum drive-time limitation.
- Drivers denoted by † did not complete sufficient laps in order to score points.

==== GT Le Mans ====
Pos.	Driver	**DAY**	**SEB**	LBH	LGA	**WGL**	MOS	ELK	VIR	AUS	**ATL**	Points	NAEC
1	(France) Patrick Pilet	5	5	4	3	6	1	1	1	**3**	1	315	**33**
2	(United States) Bill Auberlen	2	8	**1**	2	3	4	5	5	1	4	305	26
2	(Germany) Dirk Werner	2	8	1	**2**	3	4	5	5	1	4	305	26
3	(Spain) Antonio García	1	1	3	7	4	3	4	6	6	6	295	**39**
3	(Denmark) Jan Magnussen	1	1	3	7	**4**	3	4	6	6	6	295	**39**
4	(Italy) Giancarlo Fisichella	9	2	2	4	5	6	3	3	2	5	293	25
4	(Germany) Pierre Kaffer	9	2	2	4	5	6	3	3	2	5	293	25
5	(United States) John Edwards	4	4	5	1	8	2	6	4	7	2	291	25
5	(Germany) Lucas Luhr	4	4	5	1	8	2	6	4	7	2	291	25
6	(Germany) Jörg Bergmeister	7	7	8	5	2	7	2	2	5	8	276	25
7	(Germany) Wolf Henzler	8	3	6	8	1	8	8	7	4	7	268	32
7	(United States) Bryan Sellers	8	3	6	8	1	8	8	7	4	7	268	32
8	(United Kingdom) Oliver Gavin	**3**	9	7	6	7	5	7	8	8	3	261	**37**
8	(United States) Tommy Milner	3	9	7	6	7	5	7	8	8	3	261	**37**
9	(United Kingdom) Nick Tandy	5	5			6	**1**	1	**1**	3	1	255	**33**
10	(New Zealand) Earl Bamber	7	7			2	7	**2**	2	5	**8**	225	25
11	(Australia) Ryan Briscoe	1	1								3	103	**37**
12	(France) Frédéric Makowiecki	7	**7**	4							8	103	19
13	(Germany) Jens Klingmann	4	4								2	91	21
14	(Austria) Richard Lietz		5	8							1	87	18
15	(Brazil) Augusto Farfus	2	8								4	86	21
16	(United States) Patrick Long	8	3								7	80	24
17	(Denmark) Michael Christensen	7			3							56	8
18	(France) Simon Pagenaud	3	9									54	23
19	(Canada) Paul Dalla Lana	6	6									52	14
19	(Portugal) Pedro Lamy	6	6									52	14
19	(Austria) Mathias Lauda	6	6									52	14
19	(United Kingdom) Darren Turner	6	6									52	14
20	(Finland) Toni Vilander	10									5	49	12
21	(Canada) Bruno Spengler	2										33	11
22	(Italy) Andrea Bertolini		2									33	8
23	(United States) Graham Rahal	4										29	8
24	(Germany) Marc Lieb	5										27	8
25	(Germany) Stefan Mücke	6										26	8
26	(Monaco) Olivier Beretta	9										23	9
26	(Italy) Davide Rigon	9										23	9
27	(Italy) Gianmaria Bruni	10										22	8
27	(France) Emmanuel Collard	10										22	8
27	(France) François Perrodo	10										22	8

==== GT Daytona ====
Pos.	Driver	**DAY**	**SEB**	LGA	BEL	**WGL**	LIM	ELK	VIR	AUS	**ATL**	Points	NAEC
1	(United States) Townsend Bell	6	3	4	9	4	9	4	1	6	4	281	**35**
1	(United States) Bill Sweedler	6	3	4	9	4	9	4	1	6	4	281	**35**
2	(Denmark) Christina Nielsen	13	2	5	2	10	3	2	2	8	9	279	27
3	(Germany) Christopher Haase	5	5	2	3	**3**	10	6	5	3	10	277	25
3	(South Africa) Dion von Moltke	5	5	2	**3**	3	**10**	6	**5**	**3**	10	277	25
4	(Germany) Mario Farnbacher	18†	1	3	1	7	4	8	3	4	7	267	17
4	(United Kingdom) Ian James	18†	1	3	1	7	4	8	3	4	7	267	17
5	(United States) Patrick Lindsey	16	12	**1**	5	11	6	**3**	10	5	1	266	26
5	(United States) Spencer Pumpelly	16	12	1	5	11	6	3	10	5	1	266	26
6	(Netherlands) Jeroen Bleekemolen	9	**9**	11	10	6	2	1	7	1	12	265	27
6	(United States) Ben Keating	9	9	11	10	6	2	1	7	1	12	265	27
7	(United States) Leh Keen	2	7	7	4	5	7	7	6	9	8	262	25
7	(United States) Cooper MacNeil	2	7	7	4	5	7	7	6	9	8	262	25
8	(United States) Andy Lally	11	11	6	7	2	5	5	9	12	2	258	28
8	(United States) John Potter	11	11	6	7	2	5	5	9	12	2	258	28
9	(United States) Michael Marsal	12	8	10	6	9	1	10†	4	2	11	236	22
10	(Canada) Kuno Wittmer	1				10	3	2	2	8	9	202	27
11	(Finland) Markus Palttala	12	8	10	6	9		10†	4	2	11	200	22
12	(Belgium) Marc Goossens	9	4			1				7	3	144	**34**
13	(United States) Madison Snow	3	6		8	8					1	141	26
14	(United States) Al Carter	1	4			1					3	132	**45**
14	(United States) Cameron Lawrence	1	4			1					**3**	132	**45**
15	(Australia) James Davison	**13**	2	5	2							113	19
16	(United States) Andrew Davis	2	7			5					8	109	25
17	(United States) Bryce Miller	5	5			3					10	107	25
18	(Belgium) Jan Heylen	3	6		8	8						105	19
19	(Brazil) Pierre Kleinubing						8	9	8	10		93	-
19	(United States) Ray Mason						8	9	8	10		93	-
20	(Germany) Marco Seefried	11	11			2						77	20
21	(United States) Brandon Davis	13	2								9	76	23
22	(United Kingdom) Andy Priaulx	12	8								11	66	18
23	(Netherlands) Sebastiaan Bleekemolen	9	9								12	66	23
24	(Spain) Alex Riberas	18†	1								7	62	13
25	(United States) Anthony Lazzaro	6	3									57	24
26	(United States) Jeff Segal	6									4	55	20
27	(United States) Guy Cosmo			9							5	50	4
28	(United States) Boris Said	12	8									45	14
29	(Germany) Dominik Farnbacher	1										36	19
30	(United States) Dane Cameron						1					36	-
31	(New Zealand) Shane van Gisbergen	2										33	11
32	(Germany) Robert Renauer										2	33	8
33	(United States) Patrick Dempsey	3										31	9
33	(Austria) Philipp Eng	3										31	9
34	(Portugal) Rui Águas	4	10†									30	8
35	(Republic of Ireland) Matt Griffin	4										29	8
35	(Thailand) Pasin Lathouras	4										29	8
35	(Italy) Michele Rugolo	4										29	8
36	(United States) Robert Thorne	10†	14†								5	29	4
37	(United States) Colin Thompson		14†								5	28	4
38	(Germany) René Rast	5										27	10
39	(United States) Jeff Westphal	6†									6	27	4
40	(Brazil) Daniel Serra	14†									6	27	4
41	(Costa Rica) Emilio Valverde		6									26	6
42	(Italy) Matteo Cressoni										6	26	4
43	(Republic of Ireland) Damien Faulkner	7	13†									26	8
43	(Poland) Kuba Giermaziak	7	13†									26	8
43	(United States) Mike Skeen	7	13†									26	8
44	(United Kingdom) Rory Butcher	7										25	8
45	(United States) Dan Knox									7		25	-
46	(United States) Derek DeBoer	8										24	8
46	(Canada) Max Riddle	8										24	8
46	(Chile) Eliseo Salazar	8										24	8
46	(United States) Kris Wilson	8										24	8
47	(United States) Marc Miller			8								24	-
47	(United States) Jeff Mosing			8								24	-
48	(United States) Patrick Byrne			9								23	-
49	(Austria) Martin Ragginger	11										22	8
50	(United States) Jim Norman	16^{1}	12									22	6
51	(United States) Jason Hart									11		21	-
51	(United States) Mike Vess									11		21	-
52	(United States) Billy Johnson										11	21	4
53	(Denmark) Christoffer Nygaard	13										20	8
54	(United States) Michael Lira	17										18	8
55	(United States) Michael Avenatti	7^{2}	13†									2	0
56	(Venezuela) Nelson Canache Jr.	16^{1}										1	0
56	(France) Kévin Estre	16^{1}										1	0
57	(Peru) Ricardo Flores Jr.	17^{3}										1	0
57	(United States) Jim Michaelian	17^{3}										1	0
58	(Japan) Tomonobu Fujii	10†										1	0
58	(Japan) Satoshi Hoshino	10†										1	0
58	(Germany) Markus Winkelhock	10†										1	0
59	(Italy) Andrea Bertolini	14†										1	0
59	(Brazil) Marcos Gomes	14†										1	0
59	(Brazil) Francisco Longo	14†										1	0
60	(United States) Connor De Phillippi	15†	WD^{4}									1	0
60	(Germany) Marc Basseng	15†										1	0
60	(Italy) Matteo Beretta	15†										1	0
60	(Austria) Nikolaus Mayr-Melnhof	15†										1	0
60	(Hong Kong) Darryl O'Young	15†										1	0
61	(Austria) Klaus Bachler	19†										1	0
61	(Germany) Christian Engelhart	19†										1	0
61	(Switzerland) Rolf Ineichen	19†										1	0
61	(United States) Lance Willsey	19†										1	0
61	(Austria) Christopher Zöchling	19†										1	0
62	(Italy) Marco Cioci		10†									1	0
62	(Italy) Piergiuseppe Perazzini		10†									1	0
62	(Venezuela) Enzo Potolicchio		10†									1	0
63	(Germany) Marco Holzer		14†									1	0
	(United States) Dennis Trebing		WD^{4}										

Notes

- ^{1} – Three drivers of car #73, Jim Norman, Nelson Canache Jr. and Kévin Estre, only scored one point at Daytona for exceeding maximum drive-time limitation.
- ^{2} – Michael Avenatti, driving with four other drivers in car #81, only scored one point at Daytona for exceeding maximum drive-time limitation.
- ^{3} – Two drivers of car #19, Ricardo Flores Jr. and Jim Michaelian, only scored one point at Daytona for exceeding maximum drive-time limitation.
- ^{4} – The #18 of Mühlner Motorsport America and the #009 of TRG-AMR North America withdrew from the 12 Hours of Sebring before Practice with only Connor De Phillippi and Dennis Trebing confirmed as drivers respectively.
- Drivers denoted by † did not complete sufficient laps in order to score points.

=== Teams' Championships ===
Race is part of the North American Endurance Cup

==== Prototype ====
Pos.	Team	**DAY**	**SEB**	LBH	LGA	BEL	**WGL**	MOS	ELK	AUS	**ATL**	Points	NAEC
1	No. 5 Action Express Racing	2	1	5	4	**3**	**3**	5	2	6	1	309	**45**
2	No. 90 VisitFlorida.com Racing	3	3	3	1	5	1	4	5	3	**5**	306	31
3	No. 31 Action Express Racing	4	5	4	5	1	4	2	1	5	3	304	23
4	No. 01 Chip Ganassi Racing	6	4	2	7	4	2	6	**3**	**1**	2	301	**35**
5	No. 10 Wayne Taylor Racing	16^{1}	2	**1**	**2**	6	6	**1**	8	2	4	292	**33**
6	No. 60 Michael Shank Racing	**5**	13	6	3	2	7	3	4	4	9	273	23
7	No. 07 SpeedSource	11	11	7	9	7	5	7	7	9	6	241	22
8	No. 0 DeltaWing Racing	15	12	9	8		8	8	6	7	8	207	22
9	No. 70 SpeedSource	12	10	8	6					8	7	141	18
10	No. 50 Highway to Help	8	7									49	14
11	No. 57 Krohn Racing	13	**6**									45	14
12	No. 1 Tequila Patrón ESM	10	9									45	14
13	No. 2 Tequila Patrón ESM	14	8									42	14
14	No. 02 Chip Ganassi Racing	1										36	16
15	No. 66 RG Racing	7										25	8
16	No. 7 Starworks Motorsport	9	WD^{2}									23	8

Notes

- ^{1} – Car #10 was moved to last in class at Daytona for exceeding maximum drive-time limitation.
- ^{2} – The #7 of Starworks Motorsport withdrew from the 12 Hours of Sebring before Practice with only Scott Mayer and Brendon Hartley confirmed as drivers.

==== Prototype Challenge ====
Pos.	Team	**DAY**	**SEB**	LGA	BEL	**WGL**	MOS	LIM	ELK	AUS	**ATL**	Points	NAEC
1	No. 54 CORE Autosport	2	2	2	4	**4**	1	4	3	1	4	318	**37**
2	No. 52 PR1/Mathiasen Motorsports	1	1	7	6	2	5	1	4	4	**1**	313	**46**
3	No. 11 RSR Racing	4	6	**1**	5	6	4	2	1	**2**	6	301	24
4	No. 8 Starworks Motorsport	6	5	6	1	1	6	3	6	6	2	294	**32**
5	No. 85 JDC-Miller MotorSports	3	4	4	2	5	3	**6**	7	5	5	285	28
6	No. 38 Performance Tech Motorsports	7†	3	3	**3**	7	**7**	7	**2**	3	DNS	233	13
7	No. 16 BAR1 Motorsports	**8**^{1}	**7**†	5		3	2	5	5	DNS	3	178	14
8	No. 61 BAR1 Motorsports	5†								7		26	0
9	No. 88 Starworks Motorsport									DNS	7	25	4

Notes

- ^{1} – Car #16 was moved to last in class and only scored one point at Daytona for exceeding maximum drive-time limitation.
- Cars denoted by † did not complete sufficient laps in order to score points.

==== GT Le Mans ====
Pos.	Team	**DAY**	**SEB**	LBH	LGA	**WGL**	MOS	ELK	VIR	AUS	**ATL**	Points	NAEC
1	No. 911 Porsche North America	5	5	4	3	6	**1**	1	**1**	**3**	**1**	315	**33**
2	No. 25 BMW Team RLL	2	8	**1**	**2**	3	4	5	5	1	4	305	26
3	No. 3 Corvette Racing	1	1	3	7	**4**	3	4	6	6	6	295	**39**
4	No. 62 Risi Competizione	9	2	2	4	5	6	3	3	2	5	293	25
5	No. 24 BMW Team RLL	4	4	5	1	8	2	6	4	7	2	291	25
6	No. 912 Porsche North America	7	**7**	8	5	2	7	**2**	2	5	8	276	25
7	No. 17 Team Falken Tire	8	3	6	8	1	8	8	7	4	7	268	32
8	No. 4 Corvette Racing	**3**	9	7	6	7	5	7	8	8	3	261	**37**
9	No. 98 Aston Martin Racing	6	6									52	14
10	No. 51 AF Corse	10										22	8

==== GT Daytona ====
Pos.	Team	**DAY**	**SEB**	LGA	BEL	**WGL**	LIM	ELK	VIR	AUS	**ATL**	Points	NAEC
1	No. 63 Scuderia Corsa	6	3	4	9	4	9	4	1	6	4	281	**35**
2	No. 007 TRG-AMR North America	**13**	2	5	2	10	3	2	2	8	9	279	27
3	No. 48 Paul Miller Racing	5	5	2	**3**	**3**	**10**	6	**5**	**3**	10	277	25
4	No. 23 Team Seattle / Alex Job Racing	18†	1	3	1	7	4	8	3	4	7	267	17
5	No. 73 Park Place Motorsports	16	12	**1**	5	11	6	**3**	10	5	1	266	26
6	No. 33 Riley Motorsports	9	**9**	11	10	6	2	1	7	1	12	265	27
7	No. 22 Alex Job Racing	2	7	7	4	5	7	7	6	9	8	262	25
8	No. 44 Magnus Racing	11	11	6	7	2	5	5	9	12	2	258	**28**
9	No. 97 Turner Motorsport	12	8	10	6	9	1	10†	4	2	11	257	22
10	No. 93 Riley Motorsports	1	4	8		1					**3**	156	**45**
11	No. 58 Wright Motorsports	3	6		8	8						105	19
12	No. 76 Compass360 Racing						8	9	8	10		93	-
13	No. 45 Flying Lizard Motorsports	10†	14†	9						11	5	73	4
14	No. 49 AF Corse	4	10†									30	8
15	No. 64 Scuderia Corsa	14†									6	27	4
16	No. 81 GB Autosport	7	13†									26	8
17	No. 80 Lone Star Racing									7		25	-
18	No. 009 TRG-AMR North America	8	WD^{1}									24	8
19	No. 19 Mühlner Motorsport America	17										18	8
20	No. 18 Mühlner Motorsport America	15†	WD^{1}									1	0
21	No. 28 Konrad Motorsport	19†										1	0

Notes

- ^{1} – The #18 of Mühlner Motorsport America and the #009 of TRG-AMR North America withdrew from the 12 Hours of Sebring before Practice with only Connor De Phillippi and Dennis Trebing confirmed as drivers respectively.
- Cars denoted by † did not complete sufficient laps in order to score points.

=== Manufacturers' Championships ===
Race is part of the North American Endurance Cup

==== Prototype ====
Pos.	Manufacturer	**DAY**	**SEB**	LBH	LGA	BEL	**WGL**	MOS	ELK	AUS	**ATL**	Points	NAEC
1	Chevrolet	2	1	**1**	**1**	**1**	**1**	**1**	1	2	**1**	344	**52**
2	Ford	1	4	2	7	4	2	6	**3**	**1**	2	318	**46**
3	Honda	**5**	8	6	3	2	7	3	4	4	9	300	**30**
4	Mazda	11	10	7	6	7	5	7	6	7	6	282	25
5	BMW	7	7									58	15
Manufacturers ineligible for championship points
	Judd	13	**6**									0	0

==== GT Le Mans ====
Pos.	Manufacturer	**DAY**	**SEB**	LBH	LGA	**WGL**	MOS	ELK	VIR	AUS	**ATL**	Points	NAEC
1	Porsche	5	**3**	4	3	1	**1**	**1**	**1**	**3**	**1**	325	**45**
2	BMW	2	4	**1**	**1**	3	2	5	4	1	2	319	**36**
3	Chevrolet	**1**	1	3	6	**4**	3	4	6	6	3	304	**46**
4	Ferrari	9	2	2	4	5	6	3	3	2	5	302	27
Manufacturers ineligible for championship points
	Aston Martin	6	6									0	0

==== GT Daytona ====
Pos.	Manufacturer	**DAY**	**SEB**	LGA	BEL	**WGL**	LIM	ELK	VIR	AUS	**ATL**	Points	NAEC
1	Ferrari	4	3	4	9	4	9	4	1	6	4	307	**48**
2	Audi	5	5	2	**3**	**3**	**8**	6	**5**	**3**	5	306	**35**
3	Porsche	2	1	**1**^{1}	1	2	4	**3**	3	4	1	304	**48**
4	BMW	12	8	10	6	9	1	10	4	2	11	298	23
Manufacturers ineligible for championship points
	Dodge	1	**4**	11	10	1	2	1	7	1	**3**	0	0
	Aston Martin	**8**	2	5	2	10	3	2	2	8	9	0	0

Notes

- ^{1} – Porsche was unable to score at Laguna Seca due to a technical infraction, so they did not get the 35 points the winner usually gets. Audi finished second in the manufacturers' championship that race, but they did not get the points for first place.

=== Tires' Championship ===
No North American Endurance Cup in the tires' championship

==== GT Le Mans ====
Pos.	Tire	**DAY**	**SEB**	LBH	LGA	**WGL**	MOS	ELK	VIR	AUS	**ATL**	Points
1	Michelin	**1**	**1**	**1**	**1**	**2**	**1**	**1**	**1**	**1**	**1**	347
2	Falken Tire	8	3	6	8	1	8	8	7	4	7	323
