= 2015 Continental Tire Road Race Showcase =

Sports Car race

Track map of Road America

The 2015 Continental Tire Road Race Showcase was a sports car race sanctioned by the International Motor Sports Association (IMSA). The Race was held at Road America in Elkhart Lake, Wisconsin on August 9, 2015. The race was the ninth round of the 2015 United SportsCar Championship.

== Background ==
=== Preview ===
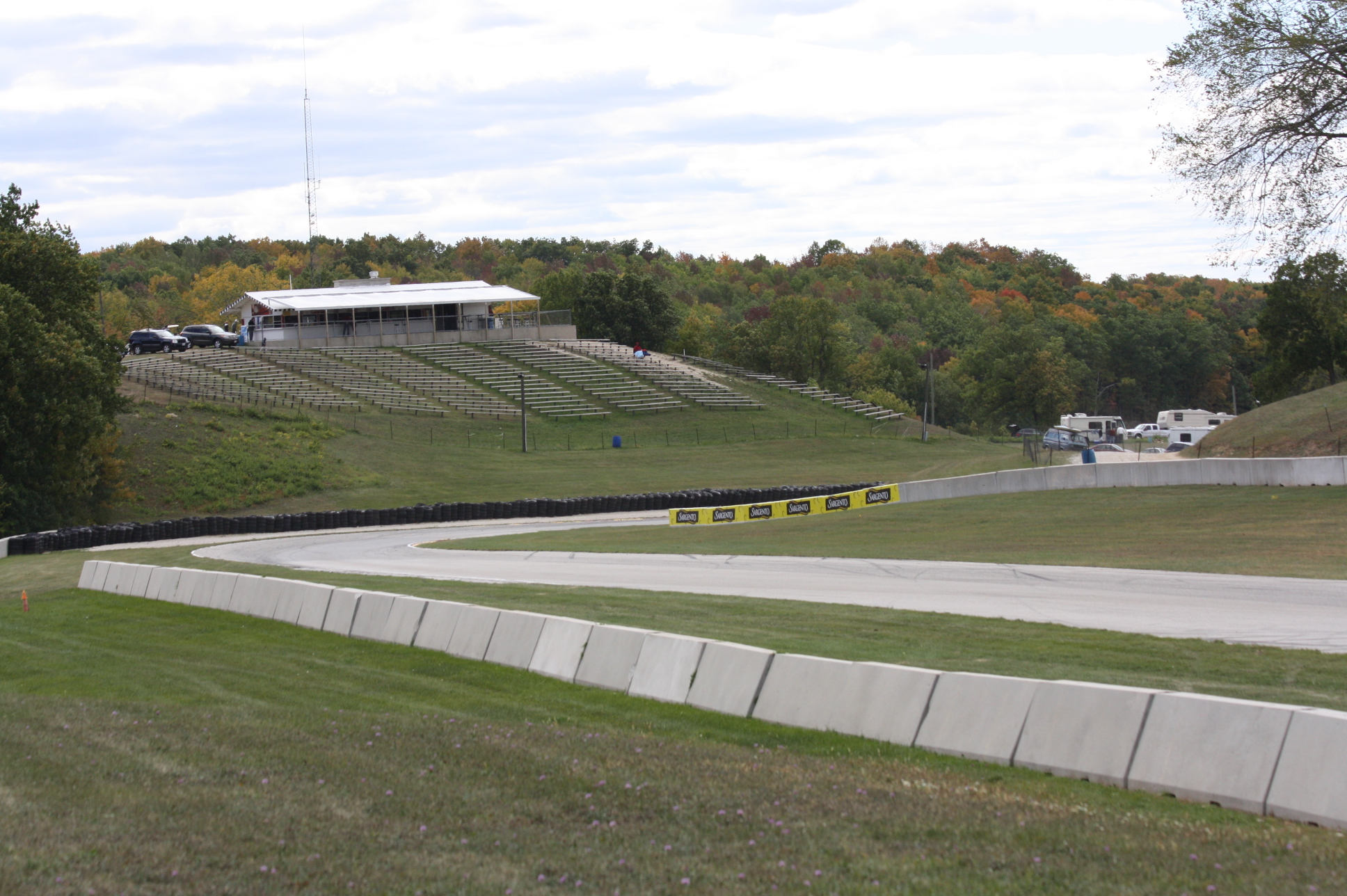
Road America, where the race was held.

International Motor Sports Association (IMSA) president Scott Atherton confirmed the race was part of the schedule for the 2015 IMSA Tudor United SportsCar Championship (IMSA TUSC) in August 2014. It was the second consecutive year the event was held as part of the United SportsCar Championship. The 2015 Continental Tire Road Race Showcase was the ninth of twelve scheduled sports car races of 2015 by IMSA, and was the sixth round not held as part of the North American Endurance Cup. The race was held at the fourteen-turn 4.048 mi (6.515 km) Road America in Elkhart Lake, Wisconsin on August 9, 2015.

=== Entry list ===
Thirty-three cars were officially entered for the Continental Tire Road Race Showcase, with most of the entries in the Prototype, Grand Touring Le Mans (GTLM), and Grand Touring Daytona (GTD) categories. Action Express Racing (AER) fielded two Chevrolet Corvette DP cars while VisitFlorida Racing (VFR) and Wayne Taylor Racing (WTR) fielded one. Chip Ganassi Racing (CGR) entered one Ford-powered Riley MkXXVI. Mazda Motorsports had one Lola B12/80 and Michael Shank Racing (MSR) entered one Ligier JS P2 chassis with Honda HR28TT twin-turbocharged 2.8-liter V6 engine. They were joined by DeltaWing with no major changes in that field. The Prototype Challenge (PC) class was composed of seven Oreca FLM09 cars. BAR1 Motorsports, CORE Autosport, JDC-Miller MotorSports, Performance Tech PR1/Mathiasen Motorsports, RSR Racing, and Starworks Motorsport entered one car each. GTLM was represented by eight entries from four different brands. In the list of GTD entrants, ten GT-specification vehicles were represented by six different manufacturers.

== Qualifying ==
=== Qualifying results ===
Pole positions in each class are indicated in bold and by ‡. P stands for Prototype, PC (Prototype Challenge), GTLM (Grand Touring Le Mans) and GTD (Grand Touring Daytona).

| Pos. | Class | No. | Team | Driver | Time | Gap | Grid |
|---|---|---|---|---|---|---|---|
| 1 | **P** | **01** | **(United States) Chip Ganassi Racing** | **(United States) Joey Hand** | **1:56.452** | **_** | 1‡ |
| 2 | P | 5 | (United States) Action Express Racing | (Brazil) Christian Fittipaldi | 1:57.020 | +0.568 | 2 |
| 3 | P | 90 | (United States) VisitFlorida.com Racing | (Canada) Michael Valiante | 1:57.173 | +0.721 | 3 |
| 4 | P | 10 | (United States) Wayne Taylor Racing | (United States) Ricky Taylor | 1:57.437 | +0.985 | 4 |
| 5 | P | 60 | (United States) Michael Shank Racing with Curb/Agajanian | (United States) John Pew | 1:57.502 | +1.050 | 5 |
| 6 | P | 0 | (United States) DeltaWing Racing Cars with Claro/TracFone | (Mexico) Memo Rojas | 1:57.736 | +1.284 | 6 |
| 7 | P | 31 | (United States) Action Express Racing | (United States) Eric Curran | 1:57.930 | +1.478 | 7 |
| 8 | **PC** | **38** | **(United States) Performance Tech Motorsports** | **(United States) James French** | **1:59.658** | **+3.206** | 8‡ |
| 9 | PC | 11 | (United States) RSR Racing | (Canada) Chris Cumming | 1:59.710 | +3.258 | 9 |
| 10 | PC | 85 | (United States) JDC-Miller MotorSports | (United States) Chris Miller | 2:00.749 | +4.297 | 10 |
| 11 | PC | 52 | (United States) PR1/Mathiasen Motorsports | (United States) Mike Guasch | 2:01.304 | +4.852 | 11 |
| 12 | PC | 54 | (United States) CORE Autosport | (United States) Jon Bennett | 2:01.727 | +5.275 | 12 |
| 13 | P | 07 | (United States) SpeedSource | (United States) Tom Long | 2:01.929 | +5.477 | 13 |
| 14 | PC | 8 | (United States) Starworks Motorsport | (Germany) Mirco Schultis | 2:02.078 | +5.626 | 14 |
| 15 | PC | 16 | (United States) BAR1 Motorsports | (United States) Matt McMurry | 2:02.155 | +5.703 | 15 |
| 16 | **GTLM** | **912** | **(United States) Porsche North America** | **(New Zealand) Earl Bamber** | **2:02.384** | **+5.932** | 16‡ |
| 17 | GTLM | 3 | (United States) Corvette Racing | (Spain) Antonio García | 2:02.608 | +6.156 | 17 |
| 18 | GTLM | 62 | (United States) Risi Competizione | (Italy) Giancarlo Fisichella | 2:02.721 | +6.269 | 18 |
| 19 | GTLM | 24 | (United States) BMW Team RLL | (United States) John Edwards | 2:03.262 | +6.810 | 19 |
| 20 | GTLM | 4 | (United States) Corvette Racing | (United States) Tommy Milner | 2:03.689 | +7.237 | 20 |
| 21 | GTLM | 25 | (United States) BMW Team RLL | (United States) Bill Auberlen | 2:03.772 | +7.320 | 21 |
| 22 | GTLM | 17 | (United States) Team Falken Tire | (Germany) Wolf Henzler | 2:03.890 | +7.438 | 22 |
| 23 | **GTD** | **73** | **(United States) Park Place Motorsports** | **(United States) Patrick Lindsey** | **2:09.370** | **+12.918** | 23‡ |
| 24 | GTD | 33 | (United States) Riley Motorsports | (United States) Ben Keating | 2:09.488 | +13.036 | 24 |
| 25 | GTD | 007 | (United States) TRG-AMR North America | (Denmark) Christina Nielsen | 2:09.947 | +13.495 | 25 |
| 26 | GTD | 48 | (United States) Paul Miller Racing | (South Africa) Dion von Moltke | 2:10.125 | +13.673 | 26 |
| 27 | GTD | 63 | (United States) Scuderia Corsa | (United States) Bill Sweedler | 2:11.116 | +14.664 | 27 |
| 28 | GTD | 23 | (United States) Team Seattle / Alex Job Racing | (United Kingdom) Ian James | 2:11.695 | +15.243 | 28 |
| 29 | GTD | 22 | (United States) Alex Job Racing | (United States) Cooper MacNeil | 2:11.836 | +15.384 | 29 |
| 30 | GTD | 44 | (United States) Magnus Racing | (United States) John Potter | 2:12.016 | +15.564 | 30 |
| 31 | GTLM | 911 | (United States) Porsche North America | (France) Patrick Pilet | 2:12.307 | +15.855 | 31 |
| 32 | GTD | 97 | (United States) Turner Motorsport | (United States) Michael Marsal | 2:12.941 | +16.589 | 32 |
| 33 | GTD | 76 | (Canada) Compass360 Racing | (United States) Ray Mason | 2:14.891 | +18.439 | 33 |

== Race ==
=== Race results ===
Class winners are denoted in bold and ‡. P stands for Prototype, PC (Prototype Challenge), GTLM (Grand Touring Le Mans) and GTD (Grand Touring Daytona).

Final race classification
| Pos | Class | No. | Team | Drivers | Chassis | Tire | Laps | Time/Retired |
| Pos | Class | No. | Team | Drivers | Engine | Tire | Laps | Time/Retired |
|---|---|---|---|---|---|---|---|---|
| 1 | **P** | **31** | **(United States) Action Express Racing** | **(United States) Eric Curran (United States) Dane Cameron** | **Corvette Daytona Prototype** | C | **76** | **2:40:58.639‡** |
| 1 | **P** | **31** | **(United States) Action Express Racing** | **(United States) Eric Curran (United States) Dane Cameron** | **Chevrolet 5.5 L V8** | C | **76** | **2:40:58.639‡** |
| 2 | P | 5 | (United States) Action Express Racing | (Portugal) João Barbosa (Brazil) Christian Fittipaldi | Corvette Daytona Prototype | C | 76 | +14.359 |
| 2 | P | 5 | (United States) Action Express Racing | (Portugal) João Barbosa (Brazil) Christian Fittipaldi | Chevrolet 5.5 L V8 | C | 76 | +14.359 |
| 3 | P | 01 | (United States) Chip Ganassi Racing | (United States) Joey Hand (United States) Scott Pruett | Ford EcoBoost Riley DP | C | 76 | +25.140 |
| 3 | P | 01 | (United States) Chip Ganassi Racing | (United States) Joey Hand (United States) Scott Pruett | Ford EcoBoost 3.5 L V6 Turbo | C | 76 | +25.140 |
| 4 | P | 60 | (United States) Michael Shank Racing with Curb/Agajanian | (United States) John Pew (Brazil) Oswaldo Negri Jr. | Ligier JS P2 | C | 76 | +28.456 |
| 4 | P | 60 | (United States) Michael Shank Racing with Curb/Agajanian | (United States) John Pew (Brazil) Oswaldo Negri Jr. | Honda HR28TT 2.8 L V6 Turbo | C | 76 | +28.456 |
| 5 | P | 90 | (United States) VisitFlorida.com Racing | (United Kingdom) Richard Westbrook (Canada) Michael Valiante | Corvette Daytona Prototype | C | 76 | +52.449 |
| 5 | P | 90 | (United States) VisitFlorida.com Racing | (United Kingdom) Richard Westbrook (Canada) Michael Valiante | Chevrolet 5.5 L V8 | C | 76 | +52.449 |
| 6 | P | 0 | (United States) DeltaWing Racing Cars with Claro/TracFone | (Mexico) Memo Rojas (United Kingdom) Katherine Legge | DeltaWing DWC13 | C | 75 | +1 lap |
| 6 | P | 0 | (United States) DeltaWing Racing Cars with Claro/TracFone | (Mexico) Memo Rojas (United Kingdom) Katherine Legge | Élan (Mazda) 1.9 L I4 Turbo | C | 75 | +1 lap |
| 7 | **PC** | **11** | **(United States) RSR Racing** | **(Canada) Chris Cumming (Brazil) Bruno Junqueira** | **Oreca FLM09** | C | **75** | **+1 lap‡** |
| 7 | **PC** | **11** | **(United States) RSR Racing** | **(Canada) Chris Cumming (Brazil) Bruno Junqueira** | **Chevrolet 6.2 L V8** | C | **75** | **+1 lap‡** |
| 8 | PC | 38 | (United States) Performance Tech Motorsports | (United States) Conor Daly (United States) James French | Oreca FLM09 | C | 75 | +1 lap |
| 8 | PC | 38 | (United States) Performance Tech Motorsports | (United States) Conor Daly (United States) James French | Chevrolet 6.2 L V8 | C | 75 | +1 lap |
| 9 | PC | 54 | (United States) CORE Autosport | (United States) Jon Bennett (United States) Colin Braun | Oreca FLM09 | C | 75 | +1 lap |
| 9 | PC | 54 | (United States) CORE Autosport | (United States) Jon Bennett (United States) Colin Braun | Chevrolet 6.2 L V8 | C | 75 | +1 lap |
| 10 | PC | 52 | (United States) PR1/Mathiasen Motorsports | (United States) Mike Guasch (United Kingdom) Tom Kimber-Smith | Oreca FLM09 | C | 75 | +1 lap |
| 10 | PC | 52 | (United States) PR1/Mathiasen Motorsports | (United States) Mike Guasch (United Kingdom) Tom Kimber-Smith | Chevrolet 6.2 L V8 | C | 75 | +1 lap |
| 11 | P | 07 | (United States) SpeedSource | (United States) Tom Long (United States) Joel Miller | Mazda Prototype | C | 74 | +2 Laps |
| 11 | P | 07 | (United States) SpeedSource | (United States) Tom Long (United States) Joel Miller | Mazda Skyactiv-D 2.2 L Turbo I4 (Diesel) | C | 74 | +2 Laps |
| 12 | PC | 16 | (United States) BAR1 Motorsports | (Canada) Daniel Burkett (United States) Matt McMurry | Oreca FLM09 | C | 74 | +2 Laps |
| 12 | PC | 16 | (United States) BAR1 Motorsports | (Canada) Daniel Burkett (United States) Matt McMurry | Chevrolet 6.2 L V8 | C | 74 | +2 Laps |
| 13 | **GTLM** | **911** | **(United States) Porsche North America** | **(France) Patrick Pilet (United Kingdom) Nick Tandy** | **Porsche 911 RSR** | MI | **74** | **+2 Laps‡** |
| 13 | **GTLM** | **911** | **(United States) Porsche North America** | **(France) Patrick Pilet (United Kingdom) Nick Tandy** | **Porsche 4.0 L Flat-6** | MI | **74** | **+2 Laps‡** |
| 14 | GTLM | 912 | (United States) Porsche North America | (New Zealand) Earl Bamber (Germany) Jörg Bergmeister | Porsche 911 RSR | MI | 74 | +2 Laps |
| 14 | GTLM | 912 | (United States) Porsche North America | (New Zealand) Earl Bamber (Germany) Jörg Bergmeister | Porsche 4.0 L Flat-6 | MI | 74 | +2 Laps |
| 15 | GTLM | 62 | (United States) Risi Competizione | (Germany) Pierre Kaffer (Italy) Giancarlo Fisichella | Ferrari 458 Italia GT2 | MI | 74 | +2 Laps |
| 15 | GTLM | 62 | (United States) Risi Competizione | (Germany) Pierre Kaffer (Italy) Giancarlo Fisichella | Ferrari 4.5 L V8 | MI | 74 | +2 Laps |
| 16 | P | 10 | (United States) Wayne Taylor Racing | (United States) Jordan Taylor (United States) Ricky Taylor | Corvette Daytona Prototype | C | 74 | +2 Laps |
| 16 | P | 10 | (United States) Wayne Taylor Racing | (United States) Jordan Taylor (United States) Ricky Taylor | Chevrolet 5.5 L V8 | C | 74 | +2 Laps |
| 17 | GTLM | 3 | (United States) Corvette Racing | (Spain) Antonio García (Denmark) Jan Magnussen | Chevrolet Corvette C7.R | MI | 73 | +3 Laps |
| 17 | GTLM | 3 | (United States) Corvette Racing | (Spain) Antonio García (Denmark) Jan Magnussen | Chevrolet LT5.5 5.5 L V8 | MI | 73 | +3 Laps |
| 18 | GTLM | 25 | (United States) BMW Team RLL | (United States) Bill Auberlen (Germany) Dirk Werner | BMW Z4 GTE | MI | 73 | +3 Laps |
| 18 | GTLM | 25 | (United States) BMW Team RLL | (United States) Bill Auberlen (Germany) Dirk Werner | BMW 4.4 L V8 | MI | 73 | +3 Laps |
| 19 | GTLM | 24 | (United States) BMW Team RLL | (United States) John Edwards (Germany) Lucas Luhr | BMW Z4 GTE | MI | 73 | +3 Laps |
| 19 | GTLM | 24 | (United States) BMW Team RLL | (United States) John Edwards (Germany) Lucas Luhr | BMW 4.4 L V8 | MI | 73 | +3 Laps |
| 20 | GTLM | 4 | (United States) Corvette Racing | (United Kingdom) Oliver Gavin (United States) Tommy Milner | Chevrolet Corvette C7.R | MI | 73 | +3 Laps |
| 20 | GTLM | 4 | (United States) Corvette Racing | (United Kingdom) Oliver Gavin (United States) Tommy Milner | Chevrolet LT5.5 5.5 L V8 | MI | 73 | +3 Laps |
| 21 | GTLM | 17 | (United States) Team Falken Tire | (United States) Bryan Sellers (Germany) Wolf Henzler | Porsche 911 RSR | FAL | 73 | +3 Laps |
| 21 | GTLM | 17 | (United States) Team Falken Tire | (United States) Bryan Sellers (Germany) Wolf Henzler | Porsche 4.0 L Flat-6 | FAL | 73 | +3 Laps |
| 22 | **GTD** | **33** | **(United States) Riley Motorsports** | **(Netherlands) Jeroen Bleekemolen (United States) Ben Keating** | **Dodge Viper GT3-R** | C | **70** | **+6 Laps‡** |
| 22 | **GTD** | **33** | **(United States) Riley Motorsports** | **(Netherlands) Jeroen Bleekemolen (United States) Ben Keating** | **Dodge 8.3 L V10** | C | **70** | **+6 Laps‡** |
| 23 | GTD | 007 | (United States) TRG-AMR North America | (Denmark) Christina Nielsen (Canada) Kuno Wittmer | Aston Martin V12 Vantage GT3 | C | 70 | +6 Laps |
| 23 | GTD | 007 | (United States) TRG-AMR North America | (Denmark) Christina Nielsen (Canada) Kuno Wittmer | Aston Martin 6.0 L V12 | C | 70 | +6 Laps |
| 24 | GTD | 73 | (United States) Park Place Motorsports | (United States) Patrick Lindsey (United States) Spencer Pumpelly | Porsche 911 GT America | C | 70 | +6 Laps |
| 24 | GTD | 73 | (United States) Park Place Motorsports | (United States) Patrick Lindsey (United States) Spencer Pumpelly | Porsche 4.0 L Flat-6 | C | 70 | +6 Laps |
| 25 | GTD | 63 | (United States) Scuderia Corsa | (United States) Bill Sweedler (United States) Townsend Bell | Ferrari 458 Italia GT3 | C | 70 | +6 Laps |
| 25 | GTD | 63 | (United States) Scuderia Corsa | (United States) Bill Sweedler (United States) Townsend Bell | Ferrari 4.5 L V8 | C | 70 | +6 Laps |
| 26 | GTD | 44 | (United States) Magnus Racing | (United States) John Potter (United States) Andy Lally | Porsche 911 GT America | C | 70 | +6 Laps |
| 26 | GTD | 44 | (United States) Magnus Racing | (United States) John Potter (United States) Andy Lally | Porsche 4.0 L Flat-6 | C | 70 | +6 Laps |
| 27 | GTD | 48 | (United States) Paul Miller Racing | (Germany) Christopher Haase (South Africa) Dion von Moltke | Audi R8 LMS ultra | C | 70 | +6 Laps |
| 27 | GTD | 48 | (United States) Paul Miller Racing | (Germany) Christopher Haase (South Africa) Dion von Moltke | Audi 5.2 L V10 | C | 70 | +6 Laps |
| 28 | GTD | 22 | (United States) Alex Job Racing | (United States) Leh Keen (United States) Cooper MacNeil | Porsche 911 GT America | C | 70 | +6 Laps |
| 28 | GTD | 22 | (United States) Alex Job Racing | (United States) Leh Keen (United States) Cooper MacNeil | Porsche 4.0 L Flat-6 | C | 70 | +6 Laps |
| 29 | GTD | 23 | (United States) Team Seattle / Alex Job Racing | (Germany) Mario Farnbacher (United Kingdom) Ian James | Porsche 911 GT America | C | 69 | +7 Laps |
| 29 | GTD | 23 | (United States) Team Seattle / Alex Job Racing | (Germany) Mario Farnbacher (United Kingdom) Ian James | Porsche 4.0 L Flat-6 | C | 69 | +7 Laps |
| 30 | GTD | 76 | (Canada) Compass360 Racing | (Brazil) Pierre Kleinubing (United States) Ray Mason | Audi R8 LMS ultra | C | 69 | +7 Laps |
| 30 | GTD | 76 | (Canada) Compass360 Racing | (Brazil) Pierre Kleinubing (United States) Ray Mason | Audi 5.2 L V10 | C | 69 | +7 Laps |
| 31 DNF | PC | 8 | (United States) Starworks Motorsport | (Germany) Mirco Schultis (Netherlands) Renger van der Zande | Oreca FLM09 | C | 60 | Engine |
| 31 DNF | PC | 8 | (United States) Starworks Motorsport | (Germany) Mirco Schultis (Netherlands) Renger van der Zande | Chevrolet 6.2 L V8 | C | 60 | Engine |
| 32 DNF | PC | 85 | (United States) JDC-Miller MotorSports | (Canada) Misha Goikhberg (United States) Chris Miller | Oreca FLM09 | C | 43 | Did Not Finish |
| 32 DNF | PC | 85 | (United States) JDC-Miller MotorSports | (Canada) Misha Goikhberg (United States) Chris Miller | Chevrolet 6.2 L V8 | C | 43 | Did Not Finish |
| 33 DNF | GTD | 97 | (United States) Turner Motorsport | (United States) Michael Marsal (Finland) Markus Palttala | BMW Z4 GT3 | C | 9 | Accident |
| 33 DNF | GTD | 97 | (United States) Turner Motorsport | (United States) Michael Marsal (Finland) Markus Palttala | BMW 4.4 L V8 | C | 9 | Accident |

Tyre manufacturers
Key
| Symbol | Tyre manufacturer |
|---|---|
| **C** | Continental |
| **MI** | Michelin |
| **FAL** | Falken Tire |

United SportsCar Championship
| Previous race: Northeast Grand Prix | 2015 season | Next race: Oak Tree Grand Prix |
