= 2015 Oak Tree Grand Prix =

Sports Car race

Track map of VIR

The 2015 Oak Tree Grand Prix was a sports car race sanctioned by the International Motor Sports Association (IMSA). The Race was held at Virginia International Raceway in Alton, Virginia on August 23, 2015. The race was the tenth round of the 2015 United SportsCar Championship.

== Background ==
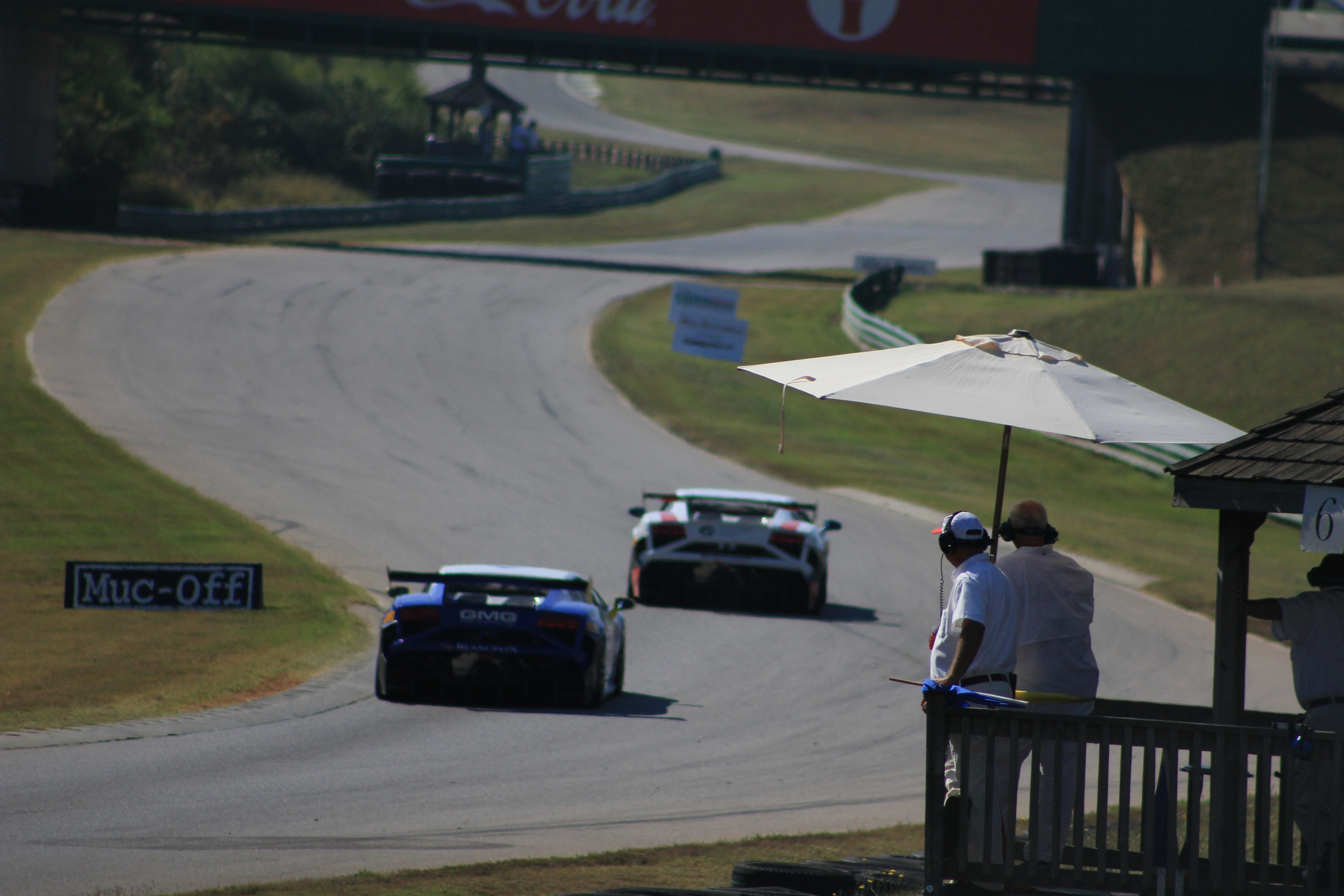
Virginia International Raceway, where the race was held.

=== Preview ===
International Motor Sports Association (IMSA) president Scott Atherton confirmed the race was part of the schedule for the 2015 IMSA Tudor United SportsCar Championship (IMSA TUSC) in August 2014. It was the second consecutive year the event was held as part of the United SportsCar Championship. The 2015 Oak Tree Grand Prix was the tenth of twelve scheduled sports car races of 2015 by IMSA, and was the seventh round not held as part of the North American Endurance Cup. The race was held at the seventeen-turn 3.270 mi (5.263 km) Virginia International Raceway in Alton, Virginia on August 23, 2015. The PC category was dropped from the event.

=== Entry list ===
Eighteen cars were officially entered for the Oak Tree Grand Prix, with most of the entries being in the Grand Touring Daytona (GTD) category. GTLM was represented by eight entries from four different brands. In the list of GTD entrants, ten GT-specification vehicles were represented by six different manufacturers. With the absence of the Prototype (P) and Prototype Challenge (PC) classes from the field, only two racing classes were represented in Virginia International Raceway.

== Qualifying ==
Saturday afternoon's 40-minute two-group qualifying session gave 15-minute sessions to all categories. Cars in GTD were sent out first before those grouped in GTLM had a separate identically timed session. Regulations stipulated teams to nominate one qualifying driver, with the fastest laps determining each class starting order. IMSA would arrange the grid to put all GTLMs ahead of the GTD cars.

=== Qualifying results ===
Pole positions in each class are indicated in bold and by ‡. GTLM stands for Grand Touring Le Mans and GTD (Grand Touring Daytona).

Pos.	Class	No.	Team	Driver	Time	Gap	Grid
1	**GTLM**	**911**	**(United States) Porsche North America**	**(United Kingdom) Nick Tandy**	**1:42.532**	**_**	1‡
2	GTLM	912	(United States) Porsche North America	(Germany) Jörg Bergmeister	1:42.629	+0.097	2
3	GTLM	62	(United States) Risi Competizione	(Germany) Pierre Kaffer	1:43.122	+0.590	3
4	GTLM	24	(United States) BMW Team RLL	(Germany) Lucas Luhr	1:43.324	+0.792	4
5	GTLM	25	(United States) BMW Team RLL	(United States) Bill Auberlen	1:43.356	+0.824	5
6	GTLM	3	(United States) Corvette Racing	(Denmark) Jan Magnussen	1:43.568	+1.036	6
7	GTLM	4	(United States) Corvette Racing	(United Kingdom) Oliver Gavin	1:43.797	+1.265	7
8	GTLM	17	(United States) Team Falken Tire	(United States) Bryan Sellers	1:44.134	+1.602	8
9	**GTD**	**48**	**(United States) Paul Miller Racing**	**(South Africa) Dion von Moltke**	**1:49.255**	**+6.723**	9‡
10	GTD	73	(United States) Park Place Motorsports	(United States) Patrick Lindsey	1:49.265	+6.733	10
11	GTD	63	(United States) Scuderia Corsa	(United States) Bill Sweedler	1:49.512	+6.980	11
12	GTD	33	(United States) Riley Motorsports	(United States) Ben Keating	1:49.837	+7.305	12
13	GTD	007	(United States) TRG-AMR North America	(Denmark) Christina Nielsen	1:50.080	+7.548	13
14	GTD	23	(United States) Team Seattle / Alex Job Racing	(United Kingdom) Ian James	1:50.253	+7.721	14
15	GTD	44	(United States) Magnus Racing	(United States) John Potter	1:50.497	+7.965	15
16	GTD	22	(United States) Alex Job Racing	(United States) Cooper MacNeil	1:50.882	+8.350	16
17	GTD	97	(United States) Turner Motorsport	(United States) Michael Marsal	1:51.330	+8.798	17
18	GTD	76	(Canada) Compass360 Racing	(United States) Ray Mason	1:53.078	+10.546	18

== Race ==
=== Race results ===
Class winners are denoted in bold and ‡. GTLM stands for Grand Touring Le Mans and GTD (Grand Touring Daytona).

Final race classification
Pos	Class	No.	Team	Drivers	Chassis	Tire	Laps	Time/Retired
Pos	Class	No.	Team	Drivers	Engine	Tire	Laps	Time/Retired
1	**GTLM**	**911**	**(United States) Porsche North America**	**(France) Patrick Pilet (United Kingdom) Nick Tandy**	**Porsche 911 RSR**	MI	**92**	**2:40:57.210‡**
1	**GTLM**	**911**	**(United States) Porsche North America**	**(France) Patrick Pilet (United Kingdom) Nick Tandy**	**Porsche 4.0 L Flat-6**	MI	**92**	**2:40:57.210‡**
2	GTLM	912	(United States) Porsche North America	(New Zealand) Earl Bamber (Germany) Jörg Bergmeister	Porsche 911 RSR	MI	92	+27.267
2	GTLM	912	(United States) Porsche North America	(New Zealand) Earl Bamber (Germany) Jörg Bergmeister	Porsche 4.0 L Flat-6	MI	92	+27.267
3	GTLM	62	(United States) Risi Competizione	(Germany) Pierre Kaffer (Italy) Giancarlo Fisichella	Ferrari 458 Italia GT2	MI	92	+27.842
3	GTLM	62	(United States) Risi Competizione	(Germany) Pierre Kaffer (Italy) Giancarlo Fisichella	Ferrari 4.5 L V8	MI	92	+27.842
4	GTLM	24	(United States) BMW Team RLL	(United States) John Edwards (Germany) Lucas Luhr	BMW Z4 GTE	MI	92	+1:01.282
4	GTLM	24	(United States) BMW Team RLL	(United States) John Edwards (Germany) Lucas Luhr	BMW 4.4 L V8	MI	92	+1:01.282
5	GTLM	25	(United States) BMW Team RLL	(United States) Bill Auberlen (Germany) Dirk Werner	BMW Z4 GTE	MI	92	+1:16.723
5	GTLM	25	(United States) BMW Team RLL	(United States) Bill Auberlen (Germany) Dirk Werner	BMW 4.4 L V8	MI	92	+1:16.723
6	GTLM	3	(United States) Corvette Racing	(Spain) Antonio García (Denmark) Jan Magnussen	Chevrolet Corvette C7.R	MI	92	+1:22.358
6	GTLM	3	(United States) Corvette Racing	(Spain) Antonio García (Denmark) Jan Magnussen	Chevrolet LT5.5 5.5 L V8	MI	92	+1:22.358
7	GTLM	17	(United States) Team Falken Tire	(United States) Bryan Sellers (Germany) Wolf Henzler	Porsche 911 RSR	FAL	91	+1 lap
7	GTLM	17	(United States) Team Falken Tire	(United States) Bryan Sellers (Germany) Wolf Henzler	Porsche 4.0 L Flat-6	FAL	91	+1 lap
8	GTLM	4	(United States) Corvette Racing	(United Kingdom) Oliver Gavin (United States) Tommy Milner	Chevrolet Corvette C7.R	MI	91	+1 lap
8	GTLM	4	(United States) Corvette Racing	(United Kingdom) Oliver Gavin (United States) Tommy Milner	Chevrolet LT5.5 5.5 L V8	MI	91	+1 lap
9	**GTD**	**63**	**(United States) Scuderia Corsa**	**(United States) Bill Sweedler (United States) Townsend Bell**	**Ferrari 458 Italia GT3**	C	**88**	**+4 Laps‡**
9	**GTD**	**63**	**(United States) Scuderia Corsa**	**(United States) Bill Sweedler (United States) Townsend Bell**	**Ferrari 4.5 L V8**	C	**88**	**+4 Laps‡**
10	GTD	007	(United States) TRG-AMR North America	(Denmark) Christina Nielsen (Canada) Kuno Wittmer	Aston Martin V12 Vantage GT3	C	87	+5 Laps
10	GTD	007	(United States) TRG-AMR North America	(Denmark) Christina Nielsen (Canada) Kuno Wittmer	Aston Martin 6.0 L V12	C	87	+5 Laps
11	GTD	23	(United States) Team Seattle / Alex Job Racing	(Germany) Mario Farnbacher (United Kingdom) Ian James	Porsche 911 GT America	C	87	+5 Laps
11	GTD	23	(United States) Team Seattle / Alex Job Racing	(Germany) Mario Farnbacher (United Kingdom) Ian James	Porsche 4.0 L Flat-6	C	87	+5 Laps
12	GTD	97	(United States) Turner Motorsport	(United States) Michael Marsal (Finland) Markus Palttala	BMW Z4 GT3	C	87	+5 Laps
12	GTD	97	(United States) Turner Motorsport	(United States) Michael Marsal (Finland) Markus Palttala	BMW 4.4 L V8	C	87	+5 Laps
13	GTD	48	(United States) Paul Miller Racing	(Germany) Christopher Haase (South Africa) Dion von Moltke	Audi R8 LMS ultra	C	87	+5 Laps
13	GTD	48	(United States) Paul Miller Racing	(Germany) Christopher Haase (South Africa) Dion von Moltke	Audi 5.2 L V10	C	87	+5 Laps
14	GTD	22	(United States) Alex Job Racing	(United States) Leh Keen (United States) Cooper MacNeil	Porsche 911 GT America	C	87	+5 Laps
14	GTD	22	(United States) Alex Job Racing	(United States) Leh Keen (United States) Cooper MacNeil	Porsche 4.0 L Flat-6	C	87	+5 Laps
15	GTD	33	(United States) Riley Motorsports	(Netherlands) Jeroen Bleekemolen (United States) Ben Keating	Dodge Viper GT3-R	C	87	+5 Laps
15	GTD	33	(United States) Riley Motorsports	(Netherlands) Jeroen Bleekemolen (United States) Ben Keating	Dodge 8.3 L V10	C	87	+5 Laps
16	GTD	76	(Canada) Compass360 Racing	(Brazil) Pierre Kleinubing (United States) Ray Mason	Audi R8 LMS ultra	C	83	+9 Laps
16	GTD	76	(Canada) Compass360 Racing	(Brazil) Pierre Kleinubing (United States) Ray Mason	Audi 5.2 L V10	C	83	+9 Laps
17 DNF	GTD	44	(United States) Magnus Racing	(United States) John Potter (United States) Andy Lally	Porsche 911 GT America	C	51	Vibration
17 DNF	GTD	44	(United States) Magnus Racing	(United States) John Potter (United States) Andy Lally	Porsche 4.0 L Flat-6	C	51	Vibration
18 DNF	GTD	73	(United States) Park Place Motorsports	(United States) Patrick Lindsey (United States) Spencer Pumpelly	Porsche 911 GT America	C	34	Cooling
18 DNF	GTD	73	(United States) Park Place Motorsports	(United States) Patrick Lindsey (United States) Spencer Pumpelly	Porsche 4.0 L Flat-6	C	34	Cooling

Tyre manufacturers
Key
Symbol	Tyre manufacturer
**C**	Continental
**MI**	Michelin
**FAL**	Falken Tire

United SportsCar Championship
Previous race: Continental Tire Road Race Showcase	2015 season	Next race: Lone Star Le Mans
