= 2015 Northeast Grand Prix =

Sports Car race

Track map of Lime Rock Park

The 2015 Northeast Grand Prix was a sports car race sanctioned by the International Motor Sports Association (IMSA). The race was held at Lime Rock Park in Lakeville, Connecticut on July 25, 2015. The race was the eighth round of the 2015 United SportsCar Championship.

== Background ==
=== Preview ===
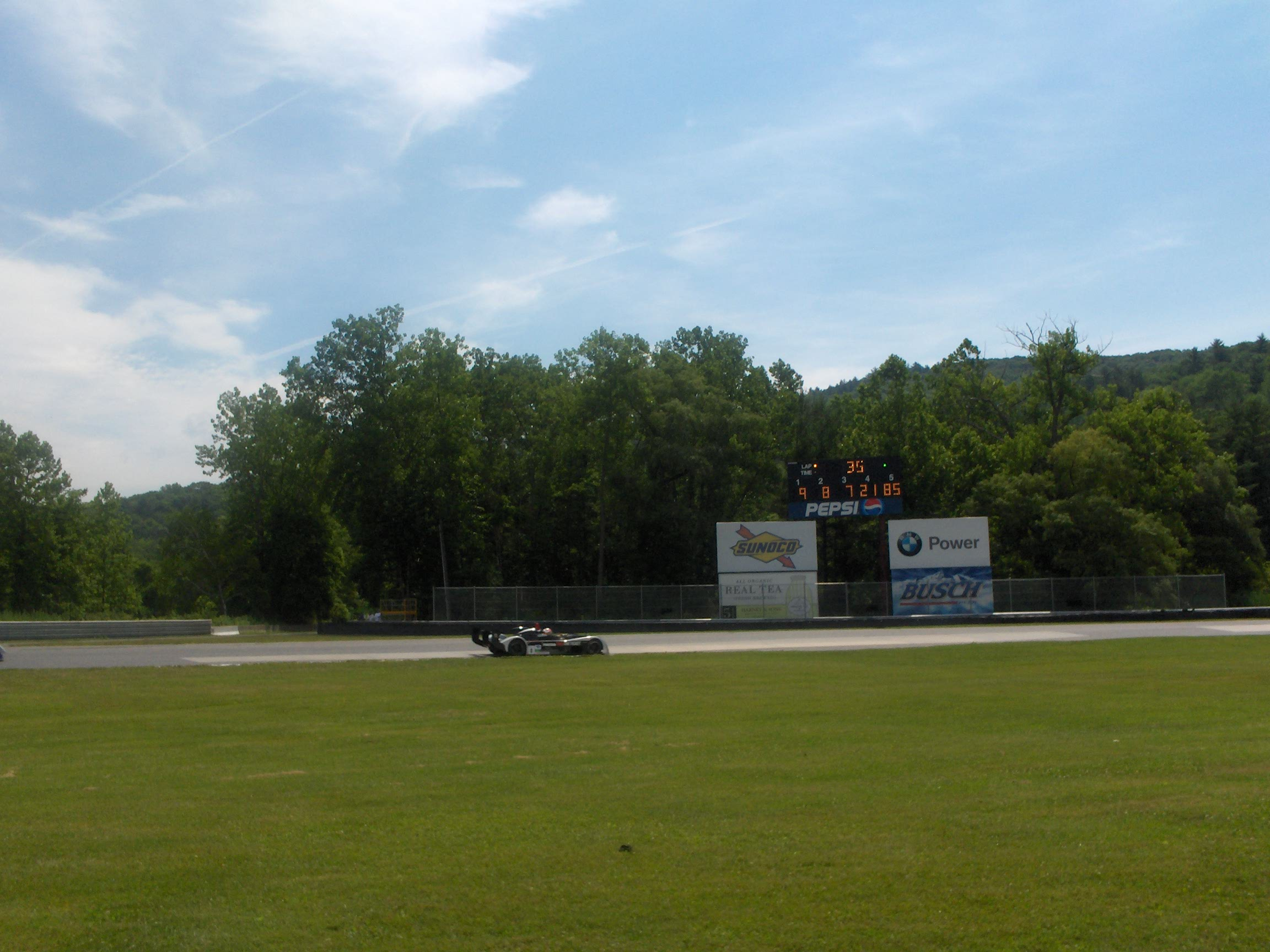
Lime Rock Park, where the race was held.

International Motor Sports Association (IMSA) president Scott Atherton confirmed the race was part of the schedule for the 2015 IMSA Tudor United SportsCar Championship (IMSA TUSC) in August 2014. It was the first year the event was held as part of the United SportsCar Championship and the twenty-fourth annual running of the race. The 2015 Northeast Grand Prix was the eighth of twelve scheduled sports car races of 2015 by IMSA, and was the fifth round not held as part of the North American Endurance Cup. The race was held at the seven-turn 1.530 mi (2.462 km) Lime Rock Park in Lakeville, Connecticut on July 25, 2015.

=== Entry list ===
Seven-teen cars were officially entered for the Northeast Grand Prix, with most of the entries being in the Grand Touring Daytona (GTD) category. The Prototype Challenge (PC) class was composed of seven Oreca FLM09 cars. BAR1 Motorsports, CORE Autosport, JDC-Miller MotorSports, Performance Tech PR1/Mathiasen Motorsports, RSR Racing, and Starworks Motorsport entered one car each. In the list of GTD entrants, ten GT-specification vehicles were represented by six different manufacturers. Compass360 Racing made their season debut. Although it was listed as an entrant, Wright Motorsports No. 58 car withdrew from the event. With the absence of the Prototype (P) and Grand Touring Le Mans (GTLM) categories from the field, only two racing classes were represented at Lime Rock Park.

== Qualifying ==
=== Qualifying results ===
Pole positions in each class are indicated in bold and by ‡. PC stands for (Prototype Challenge) and GTD (Grand Touring Daytona).

Pos.	Class	No.	Team	Time	Gap	Grid
1	**PC**	**85**	**(United States) JDC-Miller MotorSports**	**49.055**	**_**	1‡
2	PC	38	(United States) Performance Tech Motorsports	49.697	+0.642	2
3	PC	11	(United States) RSR Racing	49.966	+0.911	3
4	PC	54	(United States) CORE Autosport	50.111	+1.056	4
5	PC	52	(United States) PR1/Mathiasen Motorsports	50.504	+1.449	5
6	PC	8	(United States) Starworks Motorsport	50.821	+1.766	6
7	PC	16	(United States) BAR1 Motorsports	50.953	+1.898	7
8	**GTD**	**48**	**(United States) Paul Miller Racing**	**54.004**	**+4.949**	8‡
9	GTD	33	(United States) Riley Motorsports	54.013	+4.958	9
10	GTD	73	(United States) Park Place Motorsports	54.251	+5.196	10
11	GTD	23	(United States) Team Seattle / Alex Job Racing	54.532	+5.477	11
12	GTD	007	(United States) TRG-AMR North America	54.547	+5.492	12
13	GTD	63	(United States) Scuderia Corsa	54.761	+5.706	13
14	GTD	44	(United States) Magnus Racing	54.770	+5.715	14
15	GTD	22	(United States) Alex Job Racing	55.151	+6.096	15
16	GTD	76	(Canada) Compass360 Racing	56.775	+7.720	16
17	GTD	97	(United States) Turner Motorsport	No Time Established		17

== Race ==
=== Race results ===
Class winners are denoted in bold and ‡. PC stands for (Prototype Challenge) and GTD (Grand Touring Daytona).

Final race classification
Pos	Class	No.	Team	Drivers	Chassis	Tire	Laps	Time/Retired
Pos	Class	No.	Team	Drivers	Engine	Tire	Laps	Time/Retired
1	**PC**	**52**	**(United States) PR1/Mathiasen Motorsports**	**(United States) Mike Guasch (United Kingdom) Tom Kimber-Smith**	**Oreca FLM09**	C	**173**	**2:40:00.809‡**
1	**PC**	**52**	**(United States) PR1/Mathiasen Motorsports**	**(United States) Mike Guasch (United Kingdom) Tom Kimber-Smith**	**Chevrolet 6.2 L V8**	C	**173**	**2:40:00.809‡**
2	PC	11	(United States) RSR Racing	(Canada) Chris Cumming (Brazil) Bruno Junqueira	Oreca FLM09	C	173	+8.304
2	PC	11	(United States) RSR Racing	(Canada) Chris Cumming (Brazil) Bruno Junqueira	Chevrolet 6.2 L V8	C	173	+8.304
3	PC	8	(United States) Starworks Motorsport	(Germany) Mirco Schultis (Netherlands) Renger van der Zande	Oreca FLM09	C	172	+1 lap
3	PC	8	(United States) Starworks Motorsport	(Germany) Mirco Schultis (Netherlands) Renger van der Zande	Chevrolet 6.2 L V8	C	172	+1 lap
4	PC	54	(United States) CORE Autosport	(United States) Jon Bennett (United States) Colin Braun	Oreca FLM09	C	172	+1 lap
4	PC	54	(United States) CORE Autosport	(United States) Jon Bennett (United States) Colin Braun	Chevrolet 6.2 L V8	C	172	+1 lap
5	PC	16	(United States) BAR1 Motorsports	(United States) Todd Slusher (United States) Sean Rayhall	Oreca FLM09	C	169	+4 Laps
5	PC	16	(United States) BAR1 Motorsports	(United States) Todd Slusher (United States) Sean Rayhall	Chevrolet 6.2 L V8	C	169	+4 Laps
6	PC	85	(United States) JDC-Miller MotorSports	(Canada) Misha Goikhberg (South Africa) Stephen Simpson	Oreca FLM09	C	165	+8 Laps
6	PC	85	(United States) JDC-Miller MotorSports	(Canada) Misha Goikhberg (South Africa) Stephen Simpson	Chevrolet 6.2 L V8	C	165	+8 Laps
7	**GTD**	**97**	**(United States) Turner Motorsport**	**(United States) Dane Cameron (United States) Michael Marsal**	**BMW Z4 GT3**	C	**162**	**+11 Laps‡**
7	**GTD**	**97**	**(United States) Turner Motorsport**	**(United States) Dane Cameron (United States) Michael Marsal**	**BMW 4.4 L V8**	C	**162**	**+11 Laps‡**
8	GTD	33	(United States) Riley Motorsports	(Netherlands) Jeroen Bleekemolen (United States) Ben Keating	Dodge Viper GT3-R	C	162	+11 Laps
8	GTD	33	(United States) Riley Motorsports	(Netherlands) Jeroen Bleekemolen (United States) Ben Keating	Dodge 8.3 L V10	C	162	+11 Laps
9	GTD	007	(United States) TRG-AMR North America	(Denmark) Christina Nielsen (Canada) Kuno Wittmer	Aston Martin V12 Vantage GT3	C	162	+11 Laps
9	GTD	007	(United States) TRG-AMR North America	(Denmark) Christina Nielsen (Canada) Kuno Wittmer	Aston Martin 6.0 L V12	C	162	+11 Laps
10	GTD	23	(United States) Team Seattle / Alex Job Racing	(Germany) Mario Farnbacher (United Kingdom) Ian James	Porsche 911 GT America	C	161	+12 Laps
10	GTD	23	(United States) Team Seattle / Alex Job Racing	(Germany) Mario Farnbacher (United Kingdom) Ian James	Porsche 4.0 L Flat-6	C	161	+12 Laps
11	GTD	44	(United States) Magnus Racing	(United States) John Potter (United States) Andy Lally	Porsche 911 GT America	C	161	+12 Laps
11	GTD	44	(United States) Magnus Racing	(United States) John Potter (United States) Andy Lally	Porsche 4.0 L Flat-6	C	161	+12 Laps
12	GTD	73	(United States) Park Place Motorsports	(United States) Patrick Lindsey (United States) Spencer Pumpelly	Porsche 911 GT America	C	161	+12 Laps
12	GTD	73	(United States) Park Place Motorsports	(United States) Patrick Lindsey (United States) Spencer Pumpelly	Porsche 4.0 L Flat-6	C	161	+12 Laps
13	GTD	22	(United States) Alex Job Racing	(United States) Leh Keen (United States) Cooper MacNeil	Porsche 911 GT America	C	160	+13 Laps
13	GTD	22	(United States) Alex Job Racing	(United States) Leh Keen (United States) Cooper MacNeil	Porsche 4.0 L Flat-6	C	160	+13 Laps
14	GTD	76	(Canada) Compass360 Racing	(Brazil) Pierre Kleinubing (United States) Ray Mason	Audi R8 LMS ultra	C	159	+14 Laps
14	GTD	76	(Canada) Compass360 Racing	(Brazil) Pierre Kleinubing (United States) Ray Mason	Audi 5.2 L V10	C	159	+14 Laps
15	GTD	63	(United States) Scuderia Corsa	(United States) Bill Sweedler (United States) Townsend Bell	Ferrari 458 Italia GT3	C	149	+24 Laps
15	GTD	63	(United States) Scuderia Corsa	(United States) Bill Sweedler (United States) Townsend Bell	Ferrari 4.5 L V8	C	149	+24 Laps
16 DNF	PC	38	(United States) Performance Tech Motorsports	(United States) Conor Daly (United States) James French	Oreca FLM09	C	91	Accident
16 DNF	PC	38	(United States) Performance Tech Motorsports	(United States) Conor Daly (United States) James French	Chevrolet 6.2 L V8	C	91	Accident
17 DNF	GTD	48	(United States) Paul Miller Racing	(Germany) Christopher Haase (South Africa) Dion von Moltke	Audi R8 LMS ultra	C	85	Accident
17 DNF	GTD	48	(United States) Paul Miller Racing	(Germany) Christopher Haase (South Africa) Dion von Moltke	Audi 5.2 L V10	C	85	Accident

Tyre manufacturers
Key
Symbol	Tyre manufacturer
**C**	Continental

United SportsCar Championship
Previous race: SportsCar Grand Prix	2015 season	Next race: Continental Tire Road Race Showcase
