= 2016 24 Hours of Daytona =

Motor race

Previous: 2015	Next: 2017
Index: Races | Winners

Layout of the Daytona International Speedway road course

The 2016 24 Hours of Daytona (formally the 54th Rolex 24 at Daytona) was an International Motor Sports Association (IMSA)-sanctioned 24-hour automobile endurance race for Prototype and Grand Touring sports cars held at the Daytona International Speedway combined road course in Daytona Beach, Florida, from January 30 to 31, 2016. It was the first of twelve 2016 IMSA SportsCar Championship races, the 54th 24 Hours of Daytona, and the first of the four-round North American Endurance Cup. The event was attended by approximately 35,000 people.

SMP Racing began from pole position after Mikhail Aleshin set the fastest lap in the Prototype class. The lead was exchanged several times between the DeltaWing, Extreme Speed Motorsports (ESM), Michael Shank Racing, Wayne Taylor Racing (WTR), Mazda Motorsports and Action Express Racing teams during the race. ESM's Ed Brown, Pipo Derani, Scott Sharp and Johannes van Overbeek recovered from a late race speeding penalty to achieve the team's first win at Daytona and the lead of both the Prototype Drivers' and Teams' Championships. Honda took the lead of the Prototype Manufacturers' Championship with its first overall victory in the event. WTR's Max Angelelli, Rubens Barrichello, Jordan Taylor and Ricky Taylor finished 26 seconds later in second, and Ryan Dalziel, Marc Goossens and Ryan Hunter-Reay of VisitFlorida Racing recovered from a late race change of car component to finish third.

The Prototype Challenge (PC) category was won by JDC–Miller MotorSports' Oreca FLM09 car of Kenton Koch—Chris Miller, Misha Goikhberg and Stephen Simpson—after the team recovered from a significant crash damaging their car in the 15th hour. Robert Alon, Tom Kimber-Smith, Jose Gutiérrez and Nick Boulle finished five laps down in second, while BAR1 Motorsports' Tomy Drissi, Marc Drumwright, Brendan Gaughan, Johnny Mowlem and Ricardo Vera was third. Corvette Racing won the Grand Touring Le Mans (GTLM) class with a Chevrolet Corvette C7.R shared by Oliver Gavin. Tommy Milner and Marcel Fässler beating their teammates Antonio García, Jan Magnussen and Mike Rockenfeller by the race's closest finishing margin of 0.034 seconds. Porsche took third with Earl Bamber, Michael Christensen and Frédéric Makowiecki sharing a 911 RSR. Konrad Motorsport led the final nine minutes in Grand Touring Daytona (GTD) until its lead Lamborghini Huracán made a pit stop for fuel handing the victory to Magnus Racing's Andy Lally, John Potter, René Rast and Marco Seefried. Black Swan Racing were second in class with Nicky Catsburg, Patrick Long, Tim Pappas and Andy Pilgrim, and Damien Faulkner, Eric Foss, Ben Keating, Jeff Mosing and Gar Robinson took third for Riley Motorsports.

== Background ==
Daytona International Speedway in 2015

=== Preview ===
NASCAR founder Bill France Sr., who built the Daytona International Speedway in 1959, conceived the 24 Hours of Daytona as a race to attract European sports car endurance racing to the United States and provide international exposure to Daytona. It is informally considered part of the "Triple Crown of Endurance Racing" with the 12 Hours of Sebring and the 24 Hours of Le Mans.

International Motor Sports Association (IMSA) president Scott Atherton confirmed the race was part of the schedule for the 2016 IMSA SportsCar Championship (IMSA SCC) in August 2015. It was the third consecutive year it was part of the IMSA SCC and the 54th 24 Hours of Daytona. The 24 Hours of Daytona was the first of twelve scheduled automobile endurance races of 2016 by IMSA, and the first in the four round North American Endurance Cup (NAEC). It occurred at the 12-turn 3.56 mi (5.73 km) Daytona International Speedway combined road course in Daytona Beach, Florida, between January 30 and 31.

=== Entry list ===
There were 54 cars officially entered for the race with most of the entries in the Prototype and Grand Touring Daytona (GTD) categories. The 2015 race winners, Chip Ganassi Racing (CGR), returned to defend their title. Action Express Racing (AXR) and VisitFlorida Racing (VFR) fielded two Chevrolet Corvette DP cars and Wayne Taylor Racing (WTR) one. CGR fielded two Ford-powered Riley MkXXVI cars, while a BMW-engined example was entered by Highway to Help. Mazda Motorsports had two Lola B08/80-Mazda cars, and the Extreme Speed Motorsports (ESM) and Michael Shank Racing (MSR) teams each entered a single Ligier JS P2 chassis with Honda HR35TT twin-turbocharged 3.5-liter V6 engines. SMP Racing made its North American endurance debut at Daytona with a Nissan-powered BR Engineering BR01. Panoz brought the DeltaWing car to Daytona for the fifth successive year. The Prototype Challenge (PC) class was composed of eight Oreca FLM09-Chevrolet cars: two from Starworks Motorsports and BAR1 Motorsports. CORE Autosport, JDC–Miller MotorSports, Performance Tech and PR1/Mathiasen Motorsports entered one car each.

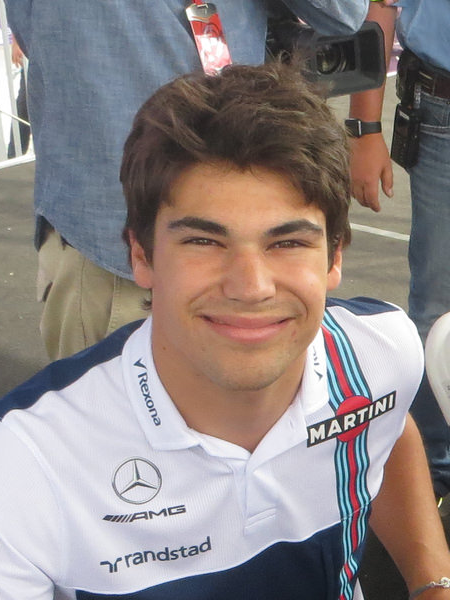
Lance Stroll (pictured in 2017) made a one-off appearance for Chip Ganassi Racing at Daytona.

Grand Touring Le Mans (GTLM) consisted of 11 cars from 5 different brands. Team RLL debuted the BMW M6 GTLM at Daytona. CGR with Felix Sabates partnered with Ford for two debuting Ford GTs. Porsche fielded two 911 RSRs, three 488 GTEs represented Ferrari with one each from Risi Competizione, Scuderia Corsa and SMP Racing, and Corvette Racing entered two C7.Rs. GTD featured 22 cars among seven different GT3 manufacturers. Lamborghini was represented by five Huracáns in its North American endurance debut: two by Konrad Motorsports and one each from Change Racing, O'Gara Motorsport and Paul Miller Racing (PMR). Porsche had five 911 Rs: two for Alex Job Racing (AJR) and one each for Black Swan Racing, Frikadelli Racing and Park Place Motorsports (PPM). A mix of teams and automotive brands made up the rest of the GTD field. These included two Stevenson Motorsports Audi R8 LMS cars: one each from Magnus Racing and Flying Lizard Motorsports (FLM) with Krohn Racing for the revised car's race debut. Turner Motorsport fielded two BMW M6s, Scuderia Corsa and Spirit of Race entered two 458 Italias. There were two Aston Martin V12 Vantages from Aston Martin Racing and TRG-AMR and two Riley Motorsports Dodge Viper Rs.

Two full-time IMSA SCC drivers drove a car, joined by one NAEC racer and one or two extra drivers. These additional participants were recruited from a variety of racing categories, including the FIA World Endurance Championship (such as Marcel Fässler for Corvette and Richie Stanaway for Aston Martin), the IndyCar Series (such as Ryan Hunter-Reay for VFR and Scott Dixon for CGR), and the Deutsche Tourenwagen Masters (such as Augusto Farfus and Bruno Spengler for Team RLL) among others. Some drivers competed at Daytona on a one-off basis in 2016 such as: European Formula Three Championship racers Lance Stroll and Felix Rosenqvist, V8 Supercars driver Shane van Gisbergen, and A. J. Allmendinger, Brendan Gaughan, Jamie McMurray, Justin Marks, and Kyle Larson from NASCAR. Jonny Adam won the 2016 Sunoco Whelen Challenge with the 2015 British GT3 title, earning him a seat with AXR. Four women entered the race: Ashley Freiberg, Katherine Legge, Christina Nielsen, and Sabine Schmitz.

== Testing ==
There were fifty-four entries involved in three days of testing divided into seven sessions held at the circuit from January 8 to 10. Risi missed the test session because it was constructing its 488 in Italy. Oswaldo Negri Jr. set the fastest time early on the first day with a 1:39.655 lap in the No. 60 MSR Ligier-Honda. His co-driver Olivier Pla improved to a 1:39.445 lap in the second session. Pipo Derani lapped second-fastest in ESM's No. 2 Ligier-Honda and Sean Rayhall put the DeltaWing third. The fastest Daytona Prototype was Jordan Taylor's No. 10 WTR Corvette in fourth. Separate crashes by Stroll at turn five soon after he left the pit lane, and João Barbosa of AXR at the Bus Stop chicane due to a possible broken rear suspension, led to stoppages on the first day. Colin Braun's No. 54 CORE Autosport Oreca led in PC with a 1:42.423 lap. BMWs took the first two positions in GTLM with Lucas Luhr's No. 100 car setting a 1:45.088lap with Farfus' No. 25 entry second. Antonio García's No. 3 Corvette and Richard Westbrook's No. 66 Ford were third and fourth in class. A leak in an FIA-mandated fuel vent on Tommy Milner's No. 4 Corvette overheated when fuel hit it and caused the car's right-rear corner to catch fire. Raffaele Giammaria's No. 51 Spirit Ferrari led GTD from Jeroen Bleekemolen's No. 23 Riley Viper.

Heavy morning fog prompted IMSA to revise the second day's schedule. Pla set the day's fastest time, a 1:39.445, ahead of Legge's DeltaWing in second. Ricky Taylor improved the WTR Corvette to third. Spencer Pigot was fourth in Mazda's No. 55 Lola, with Scott Sharp's ESM Ligier-Honda fifth. Maro Engel's No. 88 Starworks Motorsport Oreca led the PC category with a 1:43.175 time from Tom Kimber-Smith's No. 52 PR1 entry. Two crashes by Alex Popow and his teammate Renger van der Zande caused further stoppages to testing. Mike Rockenfeller's No. 3 Corvette led GTLM with a 1:45.256 lap, ahead of Alessandro Pier Guidi's No. 68 Scuderia car, Westbrook's No. 67 Ford and Jan Magnussen's No. 4 Corvette. Mirko Bortolotti's No. 48 PMR Lamborghini led in GTD with Fabio Babini's No. 28 Konrad car second. An accident with the Konrad Lamborghini and Dion von Moltke caused further disruption to testing.

The third and final day of testing held in cloudy and clear weather saw Daytona debutant Derani's ESM Ligier-Honda go fastest with a 1:39.438 time with 15 minutes left. Derani demoted Negri's MSR Ligier-Honda, which was two-tenths of a second slower in second, and Tom Long put the No. 70 Lola-Mazda third. Kirill Ladygin set the fourth-fastest lap in SMP Racing's No. 37 BR01-Nissan, and Jonathan Bomarito's No. 55 Lola-Mazda was fifth. Jack Hawksworth set the PC category's fastest lap for Starworks Motorsport's No. 8 team at 1:42.118, 0.340 seconds faster than his teammate Rosenqvist in second. Oliver Gavin's No. 4 Corvette recorded the day's quickest GTLM lap of 1:45.106. Dirk Müller caused damage to the front of the No. 66 Ford at turn five to stop testing again. The fastest GTD laps were set in the morning session by Leh Keen's No. 22 AJR Porsche and Damien Faulkner's No. 93 Riley Dodge.

== Balance of performance changes ==
After testing, IMSA altered the balance of performance in all four categories in an attempt to achieve parity within them. The BR01, DeltaWing and Ligiers received ballast increases to affect their handling. The Riley-Fords, Ligier-Hondas and Lola-Mazdas had their turbocharger boost pressures lowered to reduce performances. The Corvette Daytona Prototypes had performance changes. The eight PC vehicles had the position of their rear wings adjusted to affect its aerodynamic efficiency. BMW, Ferrari, and Ford had their turbocharger boost pressures cut to lower top speeds. Porsche's and Corvette had fuel tank size increases of 6 L (1.3 imp gal; 1.6 US gal). The GTD, Aston Martin, Audi, Dodge and Ferrari all had 20 kg (44 lb) of weight deducted, as Lamborghini and BMW received ballast increases of the same amount. Porsche received a fuel capacity increase of 1 L (0.22 imp gal; 0.26 US gal).

== Practice and qualifying ==
There were four practice sessions preceding the race's start on Saturday, three on Thursday and one on Friday. The first one-hour session on Thursday morning was followed by a half-hour session later that afternoon. The third held that evening ran for 90 minutes; the fourth on Friday morning lasted an hour.

The track was wet and the sky overcast for the first practice session. The conditions lowered lap times for the GT cars by around 10 to 15 seconds and 15 to 18 seconds for Prototype vehicles. Negri led for MSR with a lap of 1:54.807. The fastest GTLM car was Toni Vilander's No. 62 Risi Ferrari in second overall and Frédéric Makowiecki's No. 912 Porsche third. Fourth was James Calado's No. 72 SMP Ferrari and Dirk Werner's No. 25 BMW came fifth. The fastest PC class car was Ryan Lewis' BAR1 No. 26 car with a 2:00.221 lap, followed by his teammate Johnny Mowlem's sister No. 20 entry. Matt McMurry's No. 73 PPM Porsche led GTD from Bleekemolen's No. 33 Riley Viper and Gimmaria's No. 51 Spirit of Race Ferrari. Spencer Pumpelly damaged the No. 16 Change Racing Lamborghini in an accident against the inside wall leaving NASCAR turn four and stopping the session five minutes early. He was checked and released from the infield care center.

Due to a cold air temperature preventing the track from drying and a forecast for more rain, cars used wet-weather tires for the second practice session. Sébastien Bourdais in the No. 66 GTLM Ford led outright with a 1:56.024 lap. Giancarlo Fisichella's Risi Ferrari was second; third was Calado's No. 72 SMP Ferrari. The two Corvette cars were fourth and fifth. The fastest Prototype car was Mikhail Aleshin's No. 37 SMP BR01-Nissan in sixth overall. Mowlem's No. 20 BAR1 Oreca led the PC class, and Maxime Martin's No. 72 Turner BMW topped GTD. The session was first halted ten minutes in when Van Der Zande's No. 8 Starworks Oreca and the No. 50 Highway Riley-BMW stopped at the Bus Stop chicane. Both cars returned to the pit lane without external assistance. A second stoppage came soon after for track clearing due to right-rear tire tread coming off the wheel on Lars Viljoen's No. 007 Aston Martin on the front stretch. During the stoppage, the No. 97 Turner BMW's right-rear tire was found to be down. The debris damaged the FLM No. 45 Audi's right-front radiator grille.

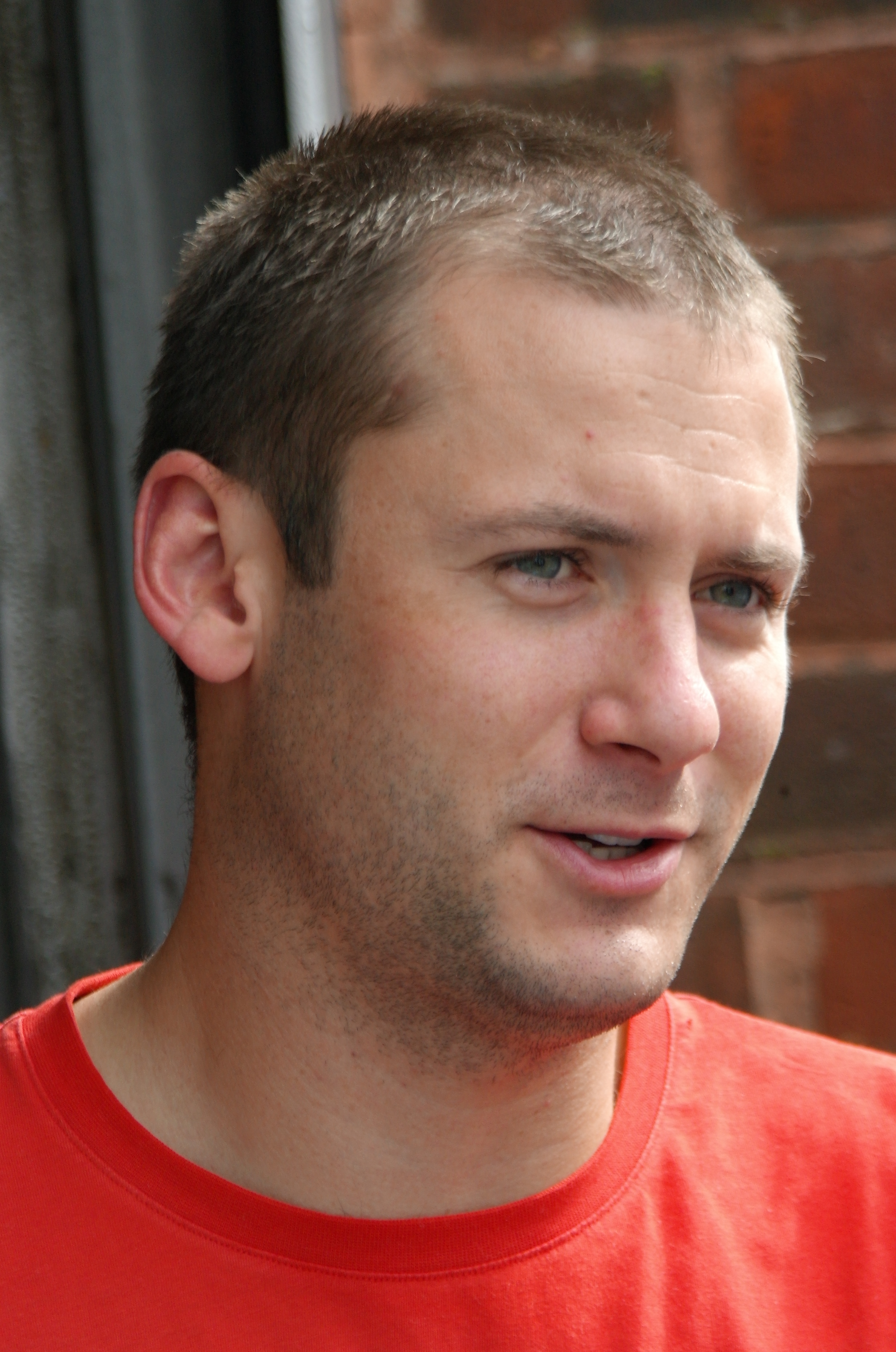
Nick Tandy (pictured in 2014) set the fastest overall lap time in qualifying.

Thursday afternoon's 90-minute four-group qualifying session gave 15-minute sessions to all categories. Regulations stipulated teams to nominate one qualifying driver, with the fastest laps determining each classes starting order. IMSA arranged the grid to put Prototypes ahead of all PC, GTLM and GTD cars. Rain fell and increased in intensity as cars lifted spray from the tarmac surface. Nick Tandy's No. 911 Porsche GTLM was fastest overall, lapping at 2:01.408. His teammate Makowiecki qualified the No. 912 Porsche on the GTLM grid's front row. John Edwards qualified the No. 100 BMW third due to an error at turn six, as Pier Guidi's Scuderia Corsa and Vilander's Risi Ferrari 488 cars took fourth and fifth. Gianmaria Bruni's No. 72 SMP car hydroplaned entering turn one and struck a tire barrier, damaging the vehicle's left-rear corner and removing the rear wing. GTLM qualifying was lengthened to give drivers a minimum of ten minutes of green flag driving.

Mowlem's No. 20 BAR1 Oreca was eighth overall and the fastest PC class car with a 2:05.708 lap. Stephen Simpson's No. 85 JDC/Miller car was second and Ryan Eversley's sister BAR1 car took third. SMP were ninth overall and began from pole position with Aleshin's 2:05.793 lap in the BR01 car's first endurance pole position after avoiding the wall on his fastest lap. He was half a second faster than Derani's ESM Ligier-Honda in second. Negri took third for MSR, and Ricky Taylor in fourth was the fastest Daytona Prototype driver after failing to control the car on the sodden circuit; WTR did not drive the final 3 1/2 minutes. Daytona debutant Alexander Wurz was fifth in CGR's No. 1 Riley-Ford. In GTD, Norbert Siedler took the class pole position in PPM's Porsche with a 2:00.878 time. Marc Basseng put the No. 28 Konrad Lamborghini second, Keen for AJR was third and Falkuner's No. 93 Riley Viper took fourth.

In the third practice session, rain continued to fall; some teams elected not to participate as 34 cars were checked to prepare for the race. Magnussen's No. 4 Corvette set the fastest overall lap of 2:05.881, with Farfus' No. 25 BMW second and Gavin's second Corvette third. Fourth overall was René Rast's GTD-category No. 44 Magnus Audi and Van Gisbergen's AJR Porsche was fifth. The highest-placed Prototype was Dorsey Schroeder's No. 50 Highway to Help Riley-BMW in sixth overall with a lap of 2:14.193. Simpson led the PC class with a 2:19.275 lap in JDC/Miller's Oreca, ahead of John Falb's No. 26 BAR1 car.

The fourth and final practice session was the first time over the weekend drivers could drive on a dry track. Legge in the DeltaWing led by 1:38.590, followed by the Ligier-Honda cars of MSR's Pla and ESM's Johannes van Overbeek in second and third. Mazda were fourth after a lap from Bomarito in its No. 55 Lola. The WTR Corvette of Max Angelelli was the fastest Prototype in fifth. Ladygin's No. 37 SMP BR01's Nissan engine failed leaving the West Horseshoe and the session was stopped briefly to allow for its recovery to the pit lane. Kimber-Smith led in PC for PR1 with a 1:43.283 lap, from JDC-Miller's Kenton Koch and CORE Autosport's Martin Plowman. Team RLL's Bill Auberlen and Luhr had the first two places in GTLM. Pier Guidi of Scuderia Corsa and Earl Bamber's No. 912 Porsche were third and fourth in class. PPM's Jörg Bergmeister led in GTD from the Lamborghinis of PMR's Mirko Bortolotti and O'Gara's Townsend Bell. A second stoppage was necessitated when the No. 60 Turner BMW stopped on the inside before the Bus Stop chicane.

=== Pre-race ===
Due to the No. 72 SMP Ferrari causing a stoppage to qualifying, the car was sent to the back of the GTLM field. Both the No. 96 and 97 Turner BMW cars had their qualifying lap times deleted due to turbocharger boost control problems; the No. 96 was demoted to the rear of the GTD grid and the No. 97 had a one-lap penalty imposed on it.

The No. 37 SMP BR01's Nissan engine was changed and was allowed to start from overall pole position because the team did so after qualifying for an endurance race. Riley Motorsport's No. 33 Viper had its clutch replaced after the team sidelined it from the final practice session.

=== Qualifying results ===
Pole positions in each class are indicated in bold. P stands for Prototype, PC (Prototype Challenge), GTLM (Grand Touring Le Mans) and GTD (Grand Touring Daytona).

Final qualifying classification
Pos.	Class	No.	Team	Driver	Time	Gap	Grid
**1**	**GTLM**	**911**	**Porsche North America**	**Nick Tandy**	**2:01.408**	—	22
2	GTLM	912	Porsche North America	Frédéric Makowiecki	2:02.364	+0.956	23
3	GTLM	100	BMW Team RLL	John Edwards	2:02.497	+1.089	24
4	GTLM	68	Scuderia Corsa	Alessandro Pier Guidi	2:03.309	+1.901	25
5	GTLM	62	Risi Competizione	Toni Vilander	2:03.386	+1.978	26
6	GTLM	4	Corvette Racing	Oliver Gavin	2:03.974	+2.566	27
7	GTLM	25	BMW Team RLL	Dirk Werner	2:03.974	+2.566	28
**8**	**PC**	**20**	**BAR1 Motorsports**	**Johnny Mowlem**	**2:05.708**	**+4.300**	14
**9**	**P**	**37**	**SMP Racing**	**Mikhail Aleshin**	**2:05.793**	**+4.385**	1
**10**	**GTD**	**73**	**Park Place Motorsports**	**Norbert Siedler**	**2:05.798**	**+4.390**	33
11	GTLM	3	Corvette Racing	Jan Magnussen	2:05.979	+4.571	29
12	P	2	Extreme Speed Motorsports	Pipo Derani	2:06.304	+4.896	2
13	GTD	28	Konrad Motorsport	Marc Basseng	2:06.357	+4.949	34
14	GTD	22	Alex Job Racing	Leh Keen	2:06.556	+5.148	35
15	GTLM	66	Ford Chip Ganassi Racing	Joey Hand	2:06.758	+5.350	30
16	GTD	93	Riley Motorsports	Damien Faulkner	2:07.392	+5.984	36
17	PC	85	JDC–Miller MotorSports	Stephen Simpson	2:07.413	+6.005	15
18	P	60	Michael Shank Racing	Oswaldo Negri Jr.	2:07.432	+6.024	3
19	PC	26	BAR1 Motorsports	Ryan Eversley	2:07.485	+6.077	16
20	GTD	30	Frikadelli Racing	Sven Müller	2:07.751	+6.343	37
21	GTD	33	Riley Motorsports	Jeroen Bleekemolen	2:07.759	+6.351	38
22	P	10	Wayne Taylor Racing	Ricky Taylor	2:07.966	+6.558	4
23	GTD	98	Aston Martin Racing	Richie Stanaway	2:07.982	+6.574	39
24	GTD	23	Team Seattle / Alex Job Racing	Mario Farnbacher	2:07.985	+6.577	40
25	GTLM	67	Ford Chip Ganassi Racing	Ryan Briscoe	2:08.440	+7.032	31
26	P	01	Ford Chip Ganassi Racing	Alexander Wurz	2:08.639	+7.231	5
27	GTD	11	O'Gara Motorsport	Townsend Bell	2:08.906	+7.498	41
28	GTD	44	Magnus Racing	Andy Lally	2:09.117	+7.709	42
29	GTD	63	Scuderia Corsa	Jeff Segal	2:09.398	+7.990	43
30	GTD	007	TRG-AMR	James Davison	2:09.477	+8.058	44
31	P	31	Action Express Racing	Dane Cameron	2:10.016	+8.608	6
32	P	02	Ford Chip Ganassi Racing	Scott Dixon	2:10.094	+8.686	7
33	GTD	97	Turner Motorsport	Markus Palttala	2:10.307	+8.899	45^{1}
34	P	90	VisitFlorida Racing	Ryan Dalziel	2:10.610	+9.202	8
35	PC	38	Performance Tech	James French	2:11.110	+9.702	17
36	GTD	51	Spirit of Race	Raffaele Giammaria	2:11.298	+9.890	46
37	GTD	6	Stevenson Motorsports	Andrew Davis	2:11.245	+10.037	47
38	P	50	Highway to Help	Dorsey Schroeder	2:13.116	+11.708	9
39	GTD	96	Turner Motorsport	Jens Klingmann	—	—	54^{2}
40	P	70	Mazda Motorsports	Tom Long	2:13.380	+11.972	10
41	GTD	48	Paul Miller Racing	Bryce Miller	2:13.398	+11.990	48
42	P	5	Action Express Racing	João Barbosa	2:15.707	+14.299	11
43	GTD	45	Flying Lizard Motorsports	Tracy Krohn	2:16.384	+14.976	49
44	P	55	Mazda Motorsports	Tristan Nunez	2:16.429	+15.021	12
45	GTD	21	Konrad Motorsport	Emanuele Busnelli	2:18.716	+17.308	50
46	PC	8	Starworks Motorsport	Alex Popow	2:19.760	+18.352	18
47	GTD	540	Black Swan Racing	Tim Pappas	2:20.513	+19.105	51
48	PC	88	Starworks Motorsport	Sean Johnston	2:28.250	+26.842	19
49	GTD	9	Stevenson Motorsports	did not participate			52
50	P	0	Panoz DeltaWing Racing	did not participate			13
51	GTD	16	Change Racing	did not participate			53
52	PC	52	PR1/Mathiasen Motorsports	did not participate			20
53	PC	54	CORE Autosport	did not participate			21
54	GTLM	72	SMP Racing	Gianmaria Bruni	No Lap Time Set		32^{3}
The starting order was arranged so that Prototype cars began ahead of all PC, GTLM and GTD entries.

Notes:

- **^1** – The No. 97 Turner Motorsport BMW had a one-lap penalty imposed on it due to a turbocharger boost violation.
- **^2** – The No. 96 Turner Motorsport BMW was ordered to begin from the back of GTD for a turbocharger boost transgression.
- **^3** – The No. 72 SMP Racing Ferrari was sent to the rear of the GTLM grid for causing qualifying to be stopped.

== Race ==
=== Start and opening hours ===
The weather at the start were clear and cool with a slight breeze; forecasts four days before the event indicated it would be partially cloudy with a maximum air temperature of 67 °F (19 °C). Approximately 35,000 people attended the event. Double 24 Hours of Daytona overall winner A. J. Foyt waved the green flag at 14:40 Eastern Standard Time (UTC−05:00) to begin proceedings. 54 cars were due to take the start, but the No. 9 Stevenson Audi was in the garage for three laps with a battery problem. Derani and Negri overtook Aleshin on lap one for first and second. Simpson moved the JDC/Miller Oreca and Bryce Miller in the PMR Lamborghini to the front of the PC and GTD categories, respectively, as Bell's O'Gara car progressed to second in GTD. Derani and Negri pulled away from the third-placed DeltaWing of Legge by 20 seconds before the first full course caution came out and the pace car appeared. Long stopped the No. 70 Lola-Mazda at turn four with a loss of oil pressure resulting from a broken flywheel and the car was retired.

Some cars made early pit stops during the caution. Corvette Racing adjusted the angle of the No. 3 C7.R's rear wing to raise its top speed. Several GTD-class vehicles including the category pole sitter Norbert Siedler's No. 73 PPM Porsche incurred stop-and-hold penalties to be taken in the pit lane. Derani maintained the lead from Negri and Legge at the rolling restart on lap 16, moving clear from the rest of the field with slower GT traffic behind his car. The lead of GTLM became a multi-manufacturer battle between Tandy's Porsche, Joey Hand of Ford, the SMP Ferrari of Bruni and Corvette Racing, which saw Tandy emerge in front. Legge overtook Negri for second overall and then the outright lead for DeltaWing before the first hour ended when Derani made a pit stop. She relinquished the lead back to Derani following a pit stop that dropped her to second.

Hand's No. 66 Ford stopped on the apron between NASCAR turns two and three with a dislodged brake line, a faulty gearbox and an intermittent kill switch issue. A caution was required to slow the race for a second time, just as Hand restarted the car and returned to the pit lane. The leaders of the Prototype and GTLM categories made pit stops under caution. Legge stalled as she exited her pit box, and ESM lost time because Van Overbeek took over from Derani. Dixon's CGR Riley-Ford elected not to make a pit stop, and led at the lap 56 restart. As Barbosa was lapping slower GTLM traffic on the outside at the International Horseshoe corner, he ran deep onto sodden grass and hit the tire wall with the right front corner of his car. He continued in the No. 5 AXR Corvette DP with no major problems. John Pew's MSR Ligier-Honda appeared to miss the braking point and struck the rear of Van Overbeek's car at the Bus Stop chicane. Both cars sustained bodywork damage, and Van Overbeek was sent into a spin.

Legge used the DeltaWing's superior aerodynamic performance to retake the lead, making her the first woman to lead a lap of the race outright. She opened up a two-second lead just as the Prototype entries made another sequence of pit stops. The ESM car had its rear wing repaired and diffuser altered, as Andy Meyrick took over from Legge in the DeltaWing. This returned McMurray's No. 2 CGR Riley-Ford to first position. Bell's No. 11 O'Gara Lamborghini was forced to enter the garage with a series of electrical problems that dropped the car down the GTD order. Dane Cameron's No. 5 AXR car and WTR driver Angelelli dueled for the lead and allowed the No. 55 Lola-Mazda and Meyrick to close up to the pair.

=== Night ===
As night fell, the Le Mans Prototype 2 (LMP2) cars struggled to generate tire temperature. Sean Johnston's No. 88 Starworks Oreca spun at the exit to the pit lane. He made contact with the wall and destroyed the car's front left corner. That wheel locked up and forced Johnston to return to the pit lane at a slow pace. Meyrick was later issued a stop-and-go penalty because he spun the DeltaWing's rear tires while it was suspended in the air on its jack for a tire change. Chris Cumming stalled the No. 8 Starworks vehicle on the racing line in the center before the first turn. He attempted to restart the car, and IMSA did not immediately activate the caution procedure. Almost 1 1/2 minutes later, Meyrick could not react in time, braked 150 feet (46 m) after not noticing yellow flags, and the DeltaWing's front struck the rear of Cumming's car with enough force to lift it from the ground. Meyrick and Cumming were evaluated at the infield care center, and Cumming was not cleared to compete. The full course caution was activated for the third time to recover the stricken cars. In the meantime, Angelelli's WTR Corvette DP overtook Cameron's No. 31 AXR car for the outright lead as they negotiated past the No. 8 Starworks Oreca. IMSA officials deemed the pass to have occurred under exceptional circumstances and changed the positions.

When racing resumed, Bomarito's No. 55 Lola-Mazda led overall with the Corvette cars of Milner and García first and second in GTLM. McMurray's No. 2 CGR Riley-Ford took the lead from Bomarito on the inside line before he experienced understeer and Milner made light contact with him. McMurray stalled the Riley-Ford just after the racing line at the International Horseshoe turn; no driver hit his car. Angelelli's WTR Corvette DP incurred a penalty for overtaking under yellow flag conditions, giving Bomarito's No. 55 Lola-Mazda a large lead. Konrad's GTD-leading No. 28 Lamborghini earned a penalty for failing to comply with the wave-around procedure during the caution, falling one lap behind Bryan Sellers' PMR car. Pla returned MSR to the lead shortly after. Before the fourth hour was over, a fourth full course yellow was needed to clear the track: Brandon Gdovic locked the wheels on the No. 38 Performance Tech car into the Bus Stop chicane and spun under braking.

As the safety car was recalled, the PC-class leading No. 54 CORE Oreca was brought into the garage by driver Mark Wilkins to be retired after he reported that a vibration jolted the car on NASCAR turn four due to an engine failure causing oil to leak from the engine bay. The car's retirement elevated the No. 52 PR1/Mathiasen car of José Gutiérrez to the lead of PC by two laps over the class field. A fifth caution came out shortly after when Don Yount spun and stalled the No. 26 BAR1 Oreca following a collision with Tandy's GTLM-class leading No. 911 Porsche. During the caution, the second-placed No. 55 Lola-Mazda of Bomarito and later Pigot had its steering wheel changed in a failed attempt to repair its lighting system. Mazda changed the car's electronic control unit, and it rejoined the race two laps down in ninth. A sixth caution was necessitated for 13 minutes when Mark Kvamme crashed the No. 88 Starworks car at the Bus Stop Chicane. Two further cautions came out within 30 minutes when Ben Keating spun and damaged the No. 93 Riley Viper at the Western Horseshoe turn and the No. 21 Konrad Lamborghini required recovery shortly after.

The cautions brought the first eight cars in GTLM onto the same lap with Bamber's No. 912 Porsche leading Magnussen's No. 3 Corvette and Calado's No. 72 SMP Ferrari. The No. 1 CGR car of Tony Kanaan was required to enter the garage to replace brakes that had lost pressure when applied into the first corner. Repairs took 15 minutes to complete, and the car rejoined the race with Larson driving it 10 laps behind the race leader. A further two cautions came when Koch stopped against a wall leaving the Bus Stop chicane, and Eversley spun and stalled the No. 26 BAR1 Oreca in the infield grass at the Western Horseshoe corner. Nine and a half hours into the race, the race-leading No. 60 MSR Ligier-Honda developed engine problems that caused it to leak oil on the track as Negri stopped on the run-off area at the Western Horseshoe turn. An 11th caution was necessitated for officials to dry the oil laid on the track, and to move Negri's car to the garage to be retired. Its retirement promoted Sharp's ESM Ligier-Honda to the outright lead before he took a stop-and-hold penalty for passing a red light at the exit of the pit lane and handing the position to Scott Pruett's No. 5 AXR car.

The PMR and Change Lamborghini cars of Miller and Justin Marks, who had been dueling for the lead of GTD, collided on the entry to turn one. Both cars spun and the PMR car sustained heavy rear suspension and left-front toe link damage by striking the end of the pit lane barrier. The collision promoted Van Gisbergen's AJR Porsche to the class lead with Alex Riberas' car second. It prompted a 27-minute 12th caution. When racing resumed, Tandy returned the No. 911 Porsche to the top of GTLM and Pruett and Angelelli battled for the outright lead. Sven Müller moved the Frikadelli Porsche to the lead of GTD before the No. 55 Lola-Mazda's retirement from a rear value train problem with Tristan Nunez caused the 13th caution. Following 19 minutes of green flag racing, the No. 50 Highway car of Thomas Gruber stopped with suspected electrical issues requiring a 14th caution to allow the car to be extricated to the pit lane. Scuderia Corsa's Pier Guidi used the caution to take the GTLM class lead, and Derani overtook Pruett's No. 5 AXR car to return ESM to first position before the 12-hour mark.

=== Morning to early afternoon ===
A suspected brake disc failure sent Luhr's No. 100 BMW into the outside barrier at turn one and caused heavy damage to the car and debris littered the area. He was sent across an access road and stopped at turn six. Luhr was uninjured, but the damage sustained to the BMW necessitated its retirement. A 13-minute 15th caution was deployed to clear the debris. After the resumption of racing, Simon Pagenaud's No. 31 AXR Corvette DP took the lead from Ed Brown's ESM Ligier-Honda. The lead of GTLM changed from Scuderia Corsa to Porsche returning to first and second with Kévin Estre's No. 911 car ahead of Bamber's No. 912 entry. The fourth-placed car in GTLM of García was hit by Olivier Beretta's Risi Ferrari. García continued without major damage to the No. 3 car. Pier Guidi separated the two Porsche cars by using a 16th caution for the SMP BR01-Nissan stopping on the circuit to take second in class. The No. 52 PR1/Mathiasen Oreca was forced to enter the garage for repairs to a malfunctioning fuel pump relay, losing the team 20 laps to the PC class-leading No. 85 JDC/Miller entry.

The close of the 14th hour saw the 17th caution: the No. 007 TRG-AMR Aston Martin of Antonio Pérez and Emanuele Busnell's No. 21 Konrad Lamborghini made contact causing the Aston Martin to spin and rest against a tire barrier on the outside of the Bus Stop chicane. Both cars were retired from the event. The two GTLM class-leading Porsche cars had their brake discs changed and promoted Bill Auberlen's No. 25 BMW to the category lead. Marc Goossens led at the restart in the No. 90 VFR Corvette DP before Cameron of AXR overtook him leaving the International Horseshoe corner. Five Prototype cars were within one second of each other as Goossens retook the lead from Cameron not long after. Before the 15th hour ended, the No. 31 AXR Corvette DP had a flash fire when fuel hit the car's cockpit and bodywork. JDC/Miller had an anxious moment when Koch damaged the No. 85 Oreca's front bodywork and suspension against a tire barrier. Koch returned to the pit lane and repairs were fast enough for his team not to relinquish the PC class lead to Yount's No. 26 BAR1 car.

The No. 67 Ford of Stefan Mücke stalled off the circuit in the center of the Bus Stop chicane in the early morning necessitating the 18th caution. Around this time, teams began to decide who would run the rest of the event. Sharp got ESM back onto the same lap as the top five and into second overall. Tracy Krohn's stall prompted the 19th caution since his Audi required recovery to the pit lane. A sequence of pit stops promoted AXR's Christian Fittipaldi to the lead, which he maintained when racing resumed. One lap later, Derani overtook Jordan Taylor for second, as García ceded the No. 3 Corvette's hold on second in GTLM by taking a drive-through penalty for pit lane speeding. Derani overtook Fittipaldi of AXR for the lead at the start of the 19th hour. Corvette Racing returned to first and second in GTLM with Milner and the recovering García bump drafting each other to pass Makowiecki's No. 912 Porsche. The third-placed GTLM No. 911 Porsche entered the garage with a faulty left-rear driveshaft, as the No. 85 JDC/Miller car had a change of front toe link at a pit stop.

Patrick Lindsey's No. 73 PPM car had a front axle failure exiting the fifth corner and slowed en route to the pit lane. He asked a guard to open a gate for access to the infield via an exit road on the circuit to avoid a caution. Lindsey negotiated his way past stationary vehicles, temporary structures and spectators to his garage. Van Gisbergen was faster than Marco Seefried's No. 44 Magnus Audi and used a better corner exit to pass him for the GTD lead. At the front, Derani was relieved by Van Overbeek in the ESM Ligier-Honda. Angelelli for WTR caught and passed Van Overbeek in slower traffic to reclaim first position in the 20th hour. Van Overbeek was able to maintain the pace of Angelelli and prevented the latter from pulling away.

The 20th caution came out when the No. 67 Ford stopped between NASCAR turns one and two with a low voltage. Bodywork from the right rear of the No. 28 Konrad Lamborghini also needed clearing. Several drivers made pit stops during the caution. Fässler in the GTLM class-leading No. 4 Corvette ignored a red light at the exit of the pit lane, earning him a one-minute stop-and-hold penalty, and lost the category lead to his teammate Rockenfeller. AJR's GTD-leading No. 23 Porsche was assessed a three-minute stop-and-hold penalty for non-compliance of the wave-by procedure. Filipe Albuquerque retook the lead for AXR and maintained it until he entered the garage to replace a broken left-rear driveshaft. Repairs took ten minutes to complete, and the team lost five laps and the lead to Angelelli. A drive-through penalty imposed on Van Overbeek's ESM Ligier-Honda for speeding in the pit lane allowed Angelelli to draw further away. That was nullified when braking issues sent Larson's No. 1 CGR Riley-Ford into the tire barrier at the West Horseshoe corner, triggering the 21st and final caution.

=== Finish ===
Derani relieved Van Overbeek in the ESM Ligier-Honda and closed up to WTR's unwell race-leading Jordan Taylor. He overtook Taylor on the outside, leaving NASCAR turn four to reclaim the lead. The Alex Job Porsche of Shane Van Gisbergen was within a second of Rast in the No. 44 Magnus Audi at the front of GTD when the car's rear wing collapsed with 50 minutes left due to a negative camber setting creating stress. He consequently spun into the infield and lost six seconds to Rast. Van Gisbergen made a pit stop for repairs to the rear wing and AJR dropped out of contention for a GTD class podium. Bamber's No. 912 Porsche had moved to the front of GTLM. He maintained the position until Gavin aboard the No. 4 Corvette employed a bump and run passing technique for first in class. IMSA race control took no action over the contact between Gavin and Bamber after deeming it acceptable. Gavin's teammate García overtook Bamber for second in GTLM.

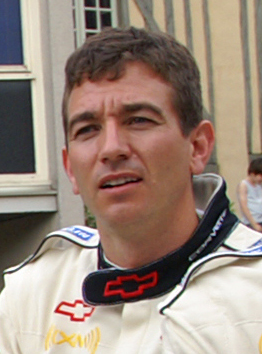
Oliver Gavin (pictured in 2009) held off his Corvette Racing teammate Antonio García to win in the GTLM category for the No. 4 team by 0.034 seconds.

Unchallenged in the final hour of the race after a power steering failure and rising transmission temperatures, Derani achieved victory for the ESM team, who completed 736 laps and finished 26.166 seconds ahead of the WTR Corvette DP of Angelelli in second. VFR followed 1 minute and 27 seconds later with the No. 90 Corvette DP to complete the overall podium in third after recovering from a lap down due to a switch of electronic control unit at a pit stop late on. It was Honda, Ligier and ESM's first Daytona win. The Ligier JS P2 became the first LMP2 car to win outright at Daytona for its first major endurance victory.

Once García moved into second in GTLM, Corvette Racing team manager Doug Fehan assured him there would be no team orders. Fehan wanted to let both cars race for the win, and spoke to Chevrolet United States vice president Jim Campbell, General Motors director of racing Mark Kent, and president of General Motors North America Mark Reuss, who all concurred with Fehan. Gavin his race engineer told him he and García could duel each other with no contact. García lapped faster than Gavin and battled him for the win in the final 20 minutes, losing to the No. 4 team by 0.034 seconds in the closest class finish in race history. Porsche completed the GTLM podium in third with the No. 912 car. It was Gavin and Milner's first American endurance win since the 2013 12 Hours of Sebring.

Rast's No. 44 Magnus Audi continued to lead in GTD by half a minute until Babini in the No. 28 Konrad Lamborghini overtook him into turn one with nine minutes to go. Babini then slowed on the banking of the back straight with a lack of fuel and gave the lead back to Rast after deciding to make a pit stop for fuel, something his team disagreed with. He conserved enough fuel over the final three minutes to win for Magnus Racing by 3.048 seconds over Nicky Catsburg's No. 540 Black Sway Porsche in second. The No. 93 Riley Viper completed the GTD podium in third. It was the Audi R8 LMS' fourth major endurance victory in five starts over the past year and its first American win. JDC/Miller won in PC with Koch ahead of Kimber-Smith's No. 52 PR1/Mathiasen team by four laps in second after PR1/Mathiasen lost time with fuel pump problems. BAR1 completed the class podium in third. There were 56 overall lead changes; ten cars reached the front of the field. The ESM Ligier-Honda led 16 times for a race-high 179 laps.

== Post-race ==
The ESM team appeared in Victory Lane to celebrate their victory in front of the crowd. Derani commented on the final 2 1/2 hours, "I was trying to not make any mistakes and keep the gap. To increase the gap up to the end was amazing. I need to thank my team for the amazing car they gave me." Sharp said the win made up for a poor 2015 season, "It is so good to see this come together so well with our merged team with Onroak." Van Overbeek said of ESM's success, "I was reflecting on this win here. Ed and I were responsible for two of the three P2 wins and it makes me happy. Running the P2 made me feel a bit like a red-haired step child, so to win here with a P2 makes me feel quite proud of all of our efforts." Honda Performance Development's Allen Miller said the manufacturer was "ecstatic" to win, its first in its third attempt, and compared the effort it took to win to its IndyCar program. Jordan Taylor believed his team were satisfied to finish second and his brother Ricky Taylor felt the race was an example of "one of the more treacherous 24-hour races in the night" due to slower PC class cars impeding him.

Doug Fehan said the battle of the two Corvette cars for the win in GTLM in the final hour was "one of those moments in my own personal career that will always stand out as being really what this sport embodies and what Corvette Racing embodies. It was a wonderful moment in time." Gavin recalled before the 2017 race he had celebrated shortly after achieving victory for the team and praised his teammate García's sportsmanship, "All I could think about was my boss, Doug Fehan and what he would say if we did touch. Then on the last lap I was thinking I had just enough on him, but then he towed up behind me. It was like the line was just going away from me. I couldn't get to the line fast enough. I've just seen a picture of it, actually, and it was pretty close." Lindsey's drive to the infield via the track received attention on social media. He said he learnt of this through a sponsor, and the public thought it was humorous.

Angelelli lost lucidity, strength and awareness of events around him because a cracked exhaust header caused the cockpit of the WTR Corvette DP to fill with exhaust fumes. He stopped on the NASCAR turn one run-off area, where track marshals waved yellow flags. WTR requested medical assistance from IMSA after failing to respond to a radio message from fainting with carbon monoxide poisoning. He was hospitalized in Daytona Beach and then Orlando, where he was treated in a hyperbaric chamber. Angelelli was released on February 1 for recuperation. WTR were interviewed by police and provided data and analysis of the incident to IMSA's Safety Field Investigation team. The GTD-class winning No. 44 Magnus Audi team was investigated for a suspected violation of drivers' stints but was cleared after IMSA found no rules violation.

The five Lamborghini Huracán V10 engines were impounded post-race and sent to NASCAR's research and development center in Concord, North Carolina, for dyno testing in February 2016. This came after the GTD manufacturers and IMSA communicated via e-mail about a series of requests to adjust the balance of performance before the race because Lamborghini ran an illegal air restrictor from an outdated Audi R8 LMS. 23 days after the event, Change Racing, Konrad Motorsport, O'Gara Motorsport and PMR incurred a retroactive five-minute stop-and-hold penalty for violating a regulation enacted to stop sandbagging. Lamborghini had its GTD Manufacturers' Championship and NAEC points scored in Daytona invalidated and was fined $25,000. It was the first time since its introduction in 2014 that IMSA imposed the regulation. The No. 28 Konrad car was demoted from fifth to tenth, and the O'Gara car fell from tenth to fifteenth.

Because it was the first race of the season, Brown, Derani, Sharp and Van Overbeek led the Prototype Drivers' Championship with 36 points, with Angelelli, Rubens Barrichello, Jordan Taylor and Ricky Taylor second with 33 points. Misha Goikhberg, Koch, Chris Miller and Simpson led the PC points standings from Robert Alon, Nicholas Boulle, Gutiérrez and Kimber-Smith. Fässler, Gavin and Milner took the lead of the GTLM Drivers' Championship with their teammates García, Magnussen and Rockenfeller in second. In the GTD points standings, Andy Lally, John Potter, Rast and Seefried held sway over Catsburg, Patrick Long, Tim Pappas and Andy Pilgrim. ESM, JDC/Miller, Corvette Racing and Magnus Racing became the leaders of their respective class Teams' Championships. Honda, Chevrolet and Audi assumed the lead of their respective Manufacturers' Championships with 11 races left in the season.

== Race results ==
Class winners are denoted in bold. P stands for Prototype, PC (Prototype Challenge), GTLM (Grand Touring Le Mans) and GTD (Grand Touring Daytona).

Final race classification
Pos	Class	No.	Team	Drivers	Chassis	Tire	Laps	Time/Retired
Pos	Class	No.	Team	Drivers	Engine	Tire	Laps	Time/Retired
1	**P**	**2**	**(United States) Tequila Patrón ESM**	**(United States) Scott Sharp (United States) Ed Brown (United States) Johannes van Overbeek (Brazil) Pipo Derani**	**Ligier JS P2**	C	**736**	**24:00:34.607**
1	**P**	**2**	**(United States) Tequila Patrón ESM**	**(United States) Scott Sharp (United States) Ed Brown (United States) Johannes van Overbeek (Brazil) Pipo Derani**	**Honda HR35TT 3.5 Turbo V6**	C	**736**	**24:00:34.607**
2	P	10	(United States) Wayne Taylor Racing	(United States) Ricky Taylor (United States) Jordan Taylor (Italy) Max Angelelli (Brazil) Rubens Barrichello	Chevrolet Corvette DP	C	736	+ 26.166
2	P	10	(United States) Wayne Taylor Racing	(United States) Ricky Taylor (United States) Jordan Taylor (Italy) Max Angelelli (Brazil) Rubens Barrichello	Chevrolet LS9 5.5 L V8	C	736	+ 26.166
3	P	90	(United States) VisitFlorida Racing	(United Kingdom) Ryan Dalziel (Belgium) Marc Goossens (United States) Ryan Hunter-Reay	Chevrolet Corvette DP	C	736	+ 1:27.276
3	P	90	(United States) VisitFlorida Racing	(United Kingdom) Ryan Dalziel (Belgium) Marc Goossens (United States) Ryan Hunter-Reay	Chevrolet LS9 5.5 L V8	C	736	+ 1:27.276
4	P	5	(United States) Action Express Racing	(Brazil) Christian Fittipaldi (Portugal) João Barbosa (Portugal) Filipe Albuquerque (United States) Scott Pruett	Chevrolet Corvette DP	C	731	+ 5 Laps
4	P	5	(United States) Action Express Racing	(Brazil) Christian Fittipaldi (Portugal) João Barbosa (Portugal) Filipe Albuquerque (United States) Scott Pruett	Chevrolet LS9 5.5 L V8	C	731	+ 5 Laps
5	P	01	(United States) Ford Chip Ganassi Racing	(Canada) Lance Stroll (Austria) Alexander Wurz (New Zealand) Brendon Hartley (United Kingdom) Andy Priaulx	Riley MkXXVI	C	725	+ 11 Laps
5	P	01	(United States) Ford Chip Ganassi Racing	(Canada) Lance Stroll (Austria) Alexander Wurz (New Zealand) Brendon Hartley (United Kingdom) Andy Priaulx	Ford EcoBoost 3.5 L Turbo V6	C	725	+ 11 Laps
6	P	31	(United States) Action Express Racing	(United States) Dane Cameron (United States) Eric Curran (France) Simon Pagenaud (United Kingdom) Jonny Adam	Chevrolet Corvette DP	C	724	+ 12 Laps
6	P	31	(United States) Action Express Racing	(United States) Dane Cameron (United States) Eric Curran (France) Simon Pagenaud (United Kingdom) Jonny Adam	Chevrolet LS9 5.5 L V8	C	724	+ 12 Laps
7	**GTLM**	**4**	**(United States) Corvette Racing**	**(United Kingdom) Oliver Gavin (United States) Tommy Milner (Switzerland) Marcel Fässler**	**Chevrolet Corvette C7.R**	M	**722**	**+ 14 Laps**
7	**GTLM**	**4**	**(United States) Corvette Racing**	**(United Kingdom) Oliver Gavin (United States) Tommy Milner (Switzerland) Marcel Fässler**	**Chevrolet LT5.5 5.5 L V8**	M	**722**	**+ 14 Laps**
8	GTLM	3	(United States) Corvette Racing	(Spain) Antonio García (Denmark) Jan Magnussen (Germany) Mike Rockenfeller	Chevrolet Corvette C7.R	M	722	+ 14 Laps
8	GTLM	3	(United States) Corvette Racing	(Spain) Antonio García (Denmark) Jan Magnussen (Germany) Mike Rockenfeller	Chevrolet LT5.5 5 L V8	M	722	+ 14 Laps
9	GTLM	912	(United States) Porsche North America	(New Zealand) Earl Bamber (France) Frédéric Makowiecki (Denmark) Michael Christensen	Porsche 911 RSR	M	722	+ 14 Laps
9	GTLM	912	(United States) Porsche North America	(New Zealand) Earl Bamber (France) Frédéric Makowiecki (Denmark) Michael Christensen	Porsche 4.0 L Flat-6	M	722	+ 14 Laps
10	GTLM	68	(United States) Scuderia Corsa	(Italy) Alessandro Pier Guidi (France) Alexandre Prémat (Brazil) Daniel Serra (Mexico) Memo Rojas	Ferrari 488 GTE	M	721	+ 15 Laps
10	GTLM	68	(United States) Scuderia Corsa	(Italy) Alessandro Pier Guidi (France) Alexandre Prémat (Brazil) Daniel Serra (Mexico) Memo Rojas	Ferrari F154 CB 3.9 L Turbo V8	M	721	+ 15 Laps
11	GTLM	25	(United States) BMW Team RLL	(United States) Bill Auberlen (Germany) Dirk Werner (Brazil) Augusto Farfus (Canada) Bruno Spengler	BMW M6 GTLM	M	721	+ 15 Laps
11	GTLM	25	(United States) BMW Team RLL	(United States) Bill Auberlen (Germany) Dirk Werner (Brazil) Augusto Farfus (Canada) Bruno Spengler	BMW 4.4 L Turbo V8	M	721	+ 15 Laps
12	GTLM	62	(United States) Risi Competizione	(Italy) Giancarlo Fisichella (Finland) Toni Vilander (Italy) Davide Rigon (Monaco) Olivier Beretta	Ferrari 488 GTE	M	709	+ 27 Laps
12	GTLM	62	(United States) Risi Competizione	(Italy) Giancarlo Fisichella (Finland) Toni Vilander (Italy) Davide Rigon (Monaco) Olivier Beretta	Ferrari F154 CB 3.9 L Turbo V8	M	709	+ 27 Laps
13	P	02	(United States) Ford Chip Ganassi Racing	(New Zealand) Scott Dixon (Brazil) Tony Kanaan (United States) Jamie McMurray (United States) Kyle Larson	Riley MkXXVI	C	708	+ 28 Laps
13	P	02	(United States) Ford Chip Ganassi Racing	(New Zealand) Scott Dixon (Brazil) Tony Kanaan (United States) Jamie McMurray (United States) Kyle Larson	Ford EcoBoost 3.5 L Turbo V6	C	708	+ 28 Laps
14	**GTD**	**44**	**(United States) Magnus Racing**	**(United States) John Potter (United States) Andy Lally (Germany) Marco Seefried (Germany) René Rast**	**Audi R8 LMS GT3**	C	**703**	**+ 33 Laps**
14	**GTD**	**44**	**(United States) Magnus Racing**	**(United States) John Potter (United States) Andy Lally (Germany) Marco Seefried (Germany) René Rast**	**Audi 5.0 L V10**	C	**703**	**+ 33 Laps**
15	GTD	540	(United States) Black Swan Racing	(United States) Tim Pappas (Netherlands) Nicky Catsburg (United States) Patrick Long (United States) Andy Pilgrim	Porsche GT3 R	C	703	+ 33 Laps
15	GTD	540	(United States) Black Swan Racing	(United States) Tim Pappas (Netherlands) Nicky Catsburg (United States) Patrick Long (United States) Andy Pilgrim	Porsche 4.0 L Flat 6	C	703	+ 33 Laps
16	GTD	93	(United States) Riley Motorsports	(United States) Ben Keating (United States) Jeff Mosing (Republic of Ireland) Damien Faulkner (United States) Gar Robinson (United States) Eric Foss	Dodge Viper GT3-R	C	703	+33 Laps
16	GTD	93	(United States) Riley Motorsports	(United States) Ben Keating (United States) Jeff Mosing (Republic of Ireland) Damien Faulkner (United States) Gar Robinson (United States) Eric Foss	Viper 8.4 L V10	C	703	+33 Laps
17	GTD	98	(United States) Aston Martin Racing	(Canada) Paul Dalla Lana (Portugal) Pedro Lamy (Austria) Mathias Lauda (New Zealand) Richie Stanaway	Aston Martin Vantage GT3	C	702	+ 34 Laps
17	GTD	98	(United States) Aston Martin Racing	(Canada) Paul Dalla Lana (Portugal) Pedro Lamy (Austria) Mathias Lauda (New Zealand) Richie Stanaway	Aston Martin 6.0 L V12	C	702	+ 34 Laps
18	**PC**	**85**	**(United States) JDC–Miller MotorSports**	**(United States) Chris Miller (Canada) Misha Goikhberg (South Africa) Stephen Simpson (United States) Kenton Koch**	**Oreca FLM09**	C	**702**	**+ 34 Laps**
18	**PC**	**85**	**(United States) JDC–Miller MotorSports**	**(United States) Chris Miller (Canada) Misha Goikhberg (South Africa) Stephen Simpson (United States) Kenton Koch**	**Chevrolet 6.2 L V8**	C	**702**	**+ 34 Laps**
19	GTD	97	(United States) Turner Motorsport	(United States) Michael Marsal (Finland) Markus Palttala (Belgium) Maxime Martin (Finland) Jesse Krohn	BMW M6 GT3	C	701	+ 35 Laps
19	GTD	97	(United States) Turner Motorsport	(United States) Michael Marsal (Finland) Markus Palttala (Belgium) Maxime Martin (Finland) Jesse Krohn	BMW 4.4 L Turbo V8	C	701	+ 35 Laps
20	GTD	63	(United States) Scuderia Corsa	(Denmark) Christina Nielsen (Italy) Alessandro Balzan (United States) Jeff Segal (Germany) Robert Renauer	Ferrari 458 GT3	C	701	+ 35 Laps
20	GTD	63	(United States) Scuderia Corsa	(Denmark) Christina Nielsen (Italy) Alessandro Balzan (United States) Jeff Segal (Germany) Robert Renauer	Ferrari 4.5 L V8	C	701	+ 35 Laps
21	GTD	9	(United States) Stevenson Motorsports	(Australia) Kenny Habul (United States) Boris Said (United States) Dion von Moltke (France) Tristan Vautier	Audi R8 LMS GT3	C	701	+ 35 Laps
21	GTD	9	(United States) Stevenson Motorsports	(Australia) Kenny Habul (United States) Boris Said (United States) Dion von Moltke (France) Tristan Vautier	Audi 5.0 L V10	C	701	+ 35 Laps
22	GTD	23	(United States) Team Seattle / Alex Job Racing	(United Kingdom) Ian James (Germany) Mario Farnbacher (Spain) Alex Riberas (Germany) Wolf Henzler	Porsche GT3 R	C	700	+ 36 Laps
22	GTD	23	(United States) Team Seattle / Alex Job Racing	(United Kingdom) Ian James (Germany) Mario Farnbacher (Spain) Alex Riberas (Germany) Wolf Henzler	Porsche 4.0 L Flat 6	C	700	+ 36 Laps
23	GTD	33	(United States) Riley Motorsports	(United States) Ben Keating (Netherlands) Jeroen Bleekemolen (Germany) Dominik Farnbacher (United States) Marc Miller	Dodge Viper GT3-R	C	700	+ 36 Laps
23	GTD	33	(United States) Riley Motorsports	(United States) Ben Keating (Netherlands) Jeroen Bleekemolen (Germany) Dominik Farnbacher (United States) Marc Miller	Viper 8.4 L V10	C	700	+ 36 Laps
24	GTD	28	(Austria) Konrad Motorsport	(Switzerland) Rolf Ineichen (Austria) Franz Konrad (Germany) Marc Basseng (United States) Lance Willsey (Italy) Fabio Babini	Lamborghini Huracán GT3	C	699	+ 37 Laps^{4}
24	GTD	28	(Austria) Konrad Motorsport	(Switzerland) Rolf Ineichen (Austria) Franz Konrad (Germany) Marc Basseng (United States) Lance Willsey (Italy) Fabio Babini	Lamborghini 5.2 L V10	C	699	+ 37 Laps^{4}
25	PC	52	(United States) PR1/Mathiasen Motorsports	(United States) Robert Alon (United Kingdom) Tom Kimber-Smith (Mexico) Jose Gutiérrez (United States) Nicholas Boulle	Oreca FLM09	C	698	+ 38 Laps
25	PC	52	(United States) PR1/Mathiasen Motorsports	(United States) Robert Alon (United Kingdom) Tom Kimber-Smith (Mexico) Jose Gutiérrez (United States) Nicholas Boulle	Chevrolet 6.2 L V8	C	698	+ 38 Laps
26	GTD	51	(United States) Spirit of Race	(United States) Peter Mann (Italy) Raffaele Giammaria (Italy) Matteo Cressoni (Italy) Marco Cioci	Ferrari 458 GT3	C	698	+ 38 Laps
26	GTD	51	(United States) Spirit of Race	(United States) Peter Mann (Italy) Raffaele Giammaria (Italy) Matteo Cressoni (Italy) Marco Cioci	Ferrari 4.5 L V8	C	698	+ 38 Laps
27	GTD	30	(Germany) Frikadelli Racing	(Germany) Klaus Abbelen (Netherlands) Patrick Huisman (Germany) Frank Stippler (Germany) Sabine Schmitz (Germany) Sven Müller	Porsche GT3 R	C	698	+ 38 Laps
27	GTD	30	(Germany) Frikadelli Racing	(Germany) Klaus Abbelen (Netherlands) Patrick Huisman (Germany) Frank Stippler (Germany) Sabine Schmitz (Germany) Sven Müller	Porsche 4.0 L Flat 6	C	698	+ 38 Laps
28	GTD	22	(United States) Alex Job Racing	(United States) David MacNeil (United States) Cooper MacNeil (United States) Leh Keen (New Zealand) Shane van Gisbergen (United States) Gunnar Jeannette	Porsche GT3 R	C	695	+ 41 Laps
28	GTD	22	(United States) Alex Job Racing	(United States) David MacNeil (United States) Cooper MacNeil (United States) Leh Keen (New Zealand) Shane van Gisbergen (United States) Gunnar Jeannette	Porsche 4.0 L Flat 6	C	695	+ 41 Laps
29	PC	20	(United States) BAR1 Motorsports	(United States) Marc Drumwright (United Kingdom) Johnny Mowlem (United States) Tomy Drissi (Puerto Rico) Ricardo Vera (United States) Brendan Gaughan	Oreca FLM09	C	693	+43 Laps
29	PC	20	(United States) BAR1 Motorsports	(United States) Marc Drumwright (United Kingdom) Johnny Mowlem (United States) Tomy Drissi (Puerto Rico) Ricardo Vera (United States) Brendan Gaughan	Chevrolet 6.2 L V8	C	693	+43 Laps
30	GTLM	66	(United States) Ford Chip Ganassi Racing	(United States) Joey Hand (Germany) Dirk Müller (France) Sébastien Bourdais	Ford GT	M	690	+ 46 Laps
30	GTLM	66	(United States) Ford Chip Ganassi Racing	(United States) Joey Hand (Germany) Dirk Müller (France) Sébastien Bourdais	Ford EcoBoost 3.5 L Turbo V6	M	690	+ 46 Laps
31	GTD	6	(United States) Stevenson Motorsports	(United Kingdom) Robin Liddell (United States) Andrew Davis (United States) Lawson Aschenbach (United States) Matt Bell	Audi R8 LMS GT3	C	690	+ 46 Laps
31	GTD	6	(United States) Stevenson Motorsports	(United Kingdom) Robin Liddell (United States) Andrew Davis (United States) Lawson Aschenbach (United States) Matt Bell	Audi 5.0 L V10	C	690	+ 46 Laps
32	GTD	11	(United States) O'Gara Motorsport	(United States) Townsend Bell (United States) Bill Sweedler (Italy) Edoardo Piscopo (Italy) Richard Antinucci	Lamborghini Huracán GT3	C	687	+ 49 Laps^{4}
32	GTD	11	(United States) O'Gara Motorsport	(United States) Townsend Bell (United States) Bill Sweedler (Italy) Edoardo Piscopo (Italy) Richard Antinucci	Lamborghini 5.2 L V10	C	687	+ 49 Laps^{4}
33	GTLM	911	(United States) Porsche North America	(France) Patrick Pilet (United Kingdom) Nick Tandy (France) Kévin Estre	Porsche 911 RSR	M	687	+ 49 Laps
33	GTLM	911	(United States) Porsche North America	(France) Patrick Pilet (United Kingdom) Nick Tandy (France) Kévin Estre	Porsche 4.0 L Flat-6	M	687	+ 49 Laps
34	PC	8	(United States) Starworks Motorsport	(Venezuela) Alex Popow (Netherlands) Renger van der Zande (Canada) Chris Cumming (United Kingdom) Jack Hawksworth	Oreca FLM09	C	685	+ 51 Laps
34	PC	8	(United States) Starworks Motorsport	(Venezuela) Alex Popow (Netherlands) Renger van der Zande (Canada) Chris Cumming (United Kingdom) Jack Hawksworth	Chevrolet 6.2 L V8	C	685	+ 51 Laps
35	GTD	48	(United States) Paul Miller Racing	(Italy) Mirko Bortolotti (United States) Bryce Miller (United States) Bryan Sellers (United States) Madison Snow	Lamborghini Huracán GT3	C	652	+ 84 Laps^{4}
35	GTD	48	(United States) Paul Miller Racing	(Italy) Mirko Bortolotti (United States) Bryce Miller (United States) Bryan Sellers (United States) Madison Snow	Lamborghini 5.2 L V10	C	652	+ 84 Laps^{4}
36	P	50	(United States) Highway to Help	(United States) Jim Pace (United States) Byron DeFoor (United Kingdom) David Hinton (United States) Dorsey Schroeder (Austria) Thomas Gruber	Riley MkXXVI	C	650	+ 86 Laps
36	P	50	(United States) Highway to Help	(United States) Jim Pace (United States) Byron DeFoor (United Kingdom) David Hinton (United States) Dorsey Schroeder (Austria) Thomas Gruber	Dinan-BMW 5.0 L V8	C	650	+ 86 Laps
37	P	37	(Russia) SMP Racing	(Italy) Maurizio Mediani (France) Nicolas Minassian (Russia) Mikhail Aleshin (Russia) Kirill Ladygin	BR Engineering BR01	C	617	+ 119 Laps
37	P	37	(Russia) SMP Racing	(Italy) Maurizio Mediani (France) Nicolas Minassian (Russia) Mikhail Aleshin (Russia) Kirill Ladygin	Nissan VK45DE 4.5 L V8	C	617	+ 119 Laps
38	PC	26	(United States) BAR1 Motorsports	(United States) Adam Merzon (United States) Ryan Eversley (United States) Don Yount (United Kingdom) Ryan Lewis (United States) John Falb	Oreca FLM09	C	610	+ 126 Laps
38	PC	26	(United States) BAR1 Motorsports	(United States) Adam Merzon (United States) Ryan Eversley (United States) Don Yount (United Kingdom) Ryan Lewis (United States) John Falb	Chevrolet 6.2 L V8	C	610	+ 126 Laps
39	GTLM	67	(United States) Ford Chip Ganassi Racing	(Australia) Ryan Briscoe (United Kingdom) Richard Westbrook (Germany) Stefan Mücke	Ford GT	M	560	+ 176 Laps
39	GTLM	67	(United States) Ford Chip Ganassi Racing	(Australia) Ryan Briscoe (United Kingdom) Richard Westbrook (Germany) Stefan Mücke	Ford EcoBoost 3.5 L Turbo V6	M	560	+ 176 Laps
40	GTLM	72	(Russia) SMP Racing	(Russia) Viktor Shaytar (Italy) Andrea Bertolini (Italy) Gianmaria Bruni (United Kingdom) James Calado	Ferrari 488 GTE	M	557	Engine
40	GTLM	72	(Russia) SMP Racing	(Russia) Viktor Shaytar (Italy) Andrea Bertolini (Italy) Gianmaria Bruni (United Kingdom) James Calado	Ferrari F154 CB 3.9 L Turbo V8	M	557	Engine
41	GTD	73	(United States) Park Place Motorsports	(United States) Patrick Lindsey (United States) Matt McMurry (Germany) Jörg Bergmeister (Austria) Norbert Siedler	Porsche GT3 R	C	524	+ 212 Laps
41	GTD	73	(United States) Park Place Motorsports	(United States) Patrick Lindsey (United States) Matt McMurry (Germany) Jörg Bergmeister (Austria) Norbert Siedler	Porsche 4.0 L Flat 6	C	524	+ 212 Laps
42	GTD	16	(United States) Change Racing	(United States) Spencer Pumpelly (United States) Corey Lewis (United States) Justin Marks (United States) Kaz Grala	Lamborghini Huracán GT3	C	521	+ 215 Laps^{4}
42	GTD	16	(United States) Change Racing	(United States) Spencer Pumpelly (United States) Corey Lewis (United States) Justin Marks (United States) Kaz Grala	Lamborghini 5.2 L V10	C	521	+ 215 Laps^{4}
43	GTD	45	(United States) Flying Lizard Motorsports	(Sweden) Niclas Jönsson (Germany) Pierre Kaffer (Germany) Christopher Haase (United States) Tracy Krohn	Audi R8 LMS GT3	C	513	Transmission
43	GTD	45	(United States) Flying Lizard Motorsports	(Sweden) Niclas Jönsson (Germany) Pierre Kaffer (Germany) Christopher Haase (United States) Tracy Krohn	Audi 5.0 L V10	C	513	Transmission
44	GTD	007	(United States) TRG-AMR	(Mexico) Santiago Creel (Mexico) Antonio Pérez (Mexico) Ricardo Pérez de Lara (Mexico) Lars Viljoen (Australia) James Davison	Aston Martin Vantage GT3	C	390	Crash
44	GTD	007	(United States) TRG-AMR	(Mexico) Santiago Creel (Mexico) Antonio Pérez (Mexico) Ricardo Pérez de Lara (Mexico) Lars Viljoen (Australia) James Davison	Aston Martin 6.0 L V12	C	390	Crash
45	PC	38	(United States) Performance Tech	(United States) James French (United States) Jim Norman (United States) Josh Norman (United States) Brandon Gdovic	Oreca FLM09	C	385	Electrical
45	PC	38	(United States) Performance Tech	(United States) James French (United States) Jim Norman (United States) Josh Norman (United States) Brandon Gdovic	Chevrolet 6.2 L V8	C	385	Electrical
46	GTLM	100	(United States) BMW Team RLL	(Germany) Lucas Luhr (United States) John Edwards (Canada) Kuno Wittmer (United States) Graham Rahal	BMW M6 GTLM	M	360	Crash
46	GTLM	100	(United States) BMW Team RLL	(Germany) Lucas Luhr (United States) John Edwards (Canada) Kuno Wittmer (United States) Graham Rahal	BMW 4.4 L Turbo V8	M	360	Crash
47	GTD	21	(Austria) Konrad Motorsport	(Italy) Emanuele Busnelli (United States) Jim Michaelian (United States) Joseph Toussaint (United States) Lance Willsey	Lamborghini Huracán GT3	C	356	Crash^{4}
47	GTD	21	(Austria) Konrad Motorsport	(Italy) Emanuele Busnelli (United States) Jim Michaelian (United States) Joseph Toussaint (United States) Lance Willsey	Lamborghini 5.2 L V10	C	356	Crash^{4}
48	GTD	96	(United States) Turner Motorsport	(United States) Bret Curtis (Germany) Jens Klingmann (United States) Ashley Freiberg (Germany) Marco Wittmann	BMW M6 GT3	C	628	+ 108 Laps^{5}
48	GTD	96	(United States) Turner Motorsport	(United States) Bret Curtis (Germany) Jens Klingmann (United States) Ashley Freiberg (Germany) Marco Wittmann	BMW 4.4 L Turbo V8	C	628	+ 108 Laps^{5}
49	P	55	(United States) Mazda Motorsports	(United States) Jonathan Bomarito (United States) Tristan Nunez (United States) Spencer Pigot	Lola B08/80	C	327	Valve
49	P	55	(United States) Mazda Motorsports	(United States) Jonathan Bomarito (United States) Tristan Nunez (United States) Spencer Pigot	Mazda MZ-2.0T 2.0 L I4 Turbo	C	327	Valve
50	P	60	(United States) Michael Shank Racing	(United States) John Pew (Brazil) Oswaldo Negri Jr. (United States) A. J. Allmendinger (France) Olivier Pla	Ligier JS P2	C	285	Engine
50	P	60	(United States) Michael Shank Racing	(United States) John Pew (Brazil) Oswaldo Negri Jr. (United States) A. J. Allmendinger (France) Olivier Pla	Honda HR35TT 3.5 Turbo V6	C	285	Engine
51	PC	88	(United States) Starworks Motorsport	(United States) Mark Kvamme (United States) Sean Johnston (Germany) Maro Engel (Sweden) Felix Rosenqvist	Oreca FLM09	C	179	Crash
51	PC	88	(United States) Starworks Motorsport	(United States) Mark Kvamme (United States) Sean Johnston (Germany) Maro Engel (Sweden) Felix Rosenqvist	Chevrolet 6.2 L V8	C	179	Crash
52	PC	54	(United States) CORE Autosport	(United States) Jon Bennett (United States) Colin Braun (Canada) Mark Wilkins (United Kingdom) Martin Plowman	Oreca FLM09	C	160	Engine
52	PC	54	(United States) CORE Autosport	(United States) Jon Bennett (United States) Colin Braun (Canada) Mark Wilkins (United Kingdom) Martin Plowman	Chevrolet 6.2 L V8	C	160	Engine
53	P	0	(United States) Panoz DeltaWing Racing	(United Kingdom) Katherine Legge (United States) Sean Rayhall (United Kingdom) Andy Meyrick (Germany) Andreas Wirth	DeltaWing DWC 13	C	119	Crash
53	P	0	(United States) Panoz DeltaWing Racing	(United Kingdom) Katherine Legge (United States) Sean Rayhall (United Kingdom) Andy Meyrick (Germany) Andreas Wirth	Élan 1.9 L Turbo I4	C	119	Crash
54	P	70	(United States) Mazda Motorsports	(United States) Joel Miller (United States) Tom Long (United Kingdom) Ben Devlin	Lola B08/80	C	11	Flywheel
54	P	70	(United States) Mazda Motorsports	(United States) Joel Miller (United States) Tom Long (United Kingdom) Ben Devlin	Mazda MZ-2.0T 2.0 L I4 Turbo	C	11	Flywheel

Tire manufacturers
Key
Symbol	Tire manufacturer
**C**	Continental
**M**	Michelin

Notes:

- **^4** – All four teams who entered a Lamborghini car incurred a retroactive five-minute stop-and-hold penalty for an engine performance transgression.
- **^5** – The No. 96 Turner Motorsport BMW was sent to the rear of the GTD finishing order for a maximum driving stint violation.

== Championship standings after the race ==
Prototype Drivers' Championship standings
Pos.	Driver	Points
1	(United States) Ed Brown (Brazil) Pipo Derani (United States) Johannes van Overbeek (United States) Scott Sharp	36
2	(Italy) Max Angelelli (Brazil) Rubens Barrichello (United States) Jordan Taylor (United States) Ricky Taylor	33 (−3)
3	(United Kingdom) Ryan Dalziel (Belgium) Marc Goossens (United States) Ryan Hunter-Reay	31 (−5)
4	(Portugal) Filipe Albuquerque (Portugal) João Barbosa (Brazil) Christian Fittipaldi (United States) Scott Pruett	29 (−7)
5	(New Zealand) Brendon Hartley (United Kingdom) Andy Priaulx (Canada) Lance Stroll (Austria) Alexander Wurz	27 (−9)

PC Drivers' Championship standings
Pos.	Driver	Points
1	(Canada) Misha Goikhberg (United States) Kenton Koch (United States) Chris Miller (South Africa) Stephen Simpson	36
2	(United States) Robert Alon (United States) Nick Boulle (Mexico) José Gutiérrez (United Kingdom) Tom Kimber-Smith	33 (−3)
3	(United States) Tomy Drissi (United States) Marc Wainwright (United Kingdom) Johnny Mowlem (Puerto Rico) Ricardo Vera	31 (−5)
4	(Venezuela) Alex Popow (Netherlands) Renger van der Zande	29 (−7)
5	(United States) John Falb (United Kingdom) Ryan Lewis (United States) Adam Merzon (United States) Don Yount	27 (−6)

GTLM Drivers' Championship standings
Pos.	Driver	Points
1	(Switzerland) Marcel Fässler (United Kingdom) Oliver Gavin (United States) Tommy Milner	36
2	(Spain) Antonio García (Denmark) Jan Magnussen (Germany) Mike Rockenfeller	33 (−3)
3	(New Zealand) Earl Bamber (Germany) Michael Christensen (France) Frédéric Makowiecki	31 (−5)
4	(Italy) Alessandro Pier Guidi (France) Alexandre Prémat (Mexico) Memo Rojas (Brazil) Daniel Serra	29 (−7)
5	(United States) Bill Auberlen (Brazil) Augusto Farfus (Canada) Bruno Spengler (Germany) Dirk Werner	27 (−9)

GTD Drivers' Championship standings
Pos.	Driver	Points
1	(United States) Andy Lally (United States) John Potter (Germany) René Rast (Germany) Marco Seefried	36
2	(Netherlands) Nicky Catsburg (United States) Patrick Long (United States) Tim Pappas (United States) Andy Pilgrim	33 (−3)
3	(Republic of Ireland) Damien Faulkner (United States) Eric Foss (United States) Jeff Mosing (United States) Gar Robinson	31 (−5)
4	(Canada) Paul Dalla Lana (Portugal) Pedro Lamy (Austria) Mathias Lauda (New Zealand) Richie Stanaway	29 (−7)
5	(Finland) Jesse Krohn (United States) Michael Marshal (Belgium) Maxime Martin (France) Markus Palttala	27 (−9)

- Note: Only the top five positions are included for all sets of standings.

Prototype Teams' Championship standings
Pos.	Team	Points
1	(United States) No. 2 Extreme Speed Motorsports	36
2	(United States) No. 10 Wayne Taylor Racing	33 (−3)
3	(United States) No. 90 VisitFlorida Racing	31 (−5)
4	(United States) No. 5 Action Express Racing	29 (−7)
5	(United States) No. 1 Ford Chip Ganassi Racing	27 (−9)

PC Teams' Championship standings
Pos.	Team	Points
1	(United States) No. 85 JDC-Miller MotorSports	36
2	(United States) No. 52 PR1/Mathiasen Motorsports	33 (−3)
3	(United States) No. 20 BAR1 Motorsports	31 (−5)
4	(United States) No. 8 Starworks Motorsport	29 (−7)
5	(United States) No. 28 BAR1 Motorsports	27 (−9)

GTLM Teams' Championship standings
Pos.	Team	Points
1	(United States) No. 4 Corvette Racing	36
2	(United States) No. 3 Corvette Racing	33 (−3)
3	(United States) No. 912 Porsche North America	31 (−5)
4	(United States) No. 68 Scuderia Corsa	29 (−7)
5	(United States) No. 25 BMW Team RLL	27 (−9)

GTD Teams' Championship standings
Pos.	Team	Points
1	(United States) No. 44 Magnus Racing	36
2	(United States) No. 540 Black Swan Racing	33 (−3)
3	(United States) No. 93 Riley Motorsports	31 (−5)
4	(United States) No. 98 Aston Martin Racing	29 (−7)
5	(United States) No. 97 Turner Motorsport	27 (−9)

- Note: Only the top five positions are included for all sets of standings.

Prototype Manufacturers' Championship standings
Pos.	Manufacturer	Points
1	(Japan) Honda	35
2	(United States) Chevrolet	32 (−3)
3	(United States) Ford	30 (−5)
4	(Germany) BMW	28 (−7)
5	(Japan) Mazda	26 (−9)

GTLM Manufacturers' Championship standings
Pos.	Manufacturer	Points
1	(United States) Chevrolet	35
2	(Germany) Porsche	32 (−3)
3	(Italy) Ferrari	30 (−5)
4	(Germany) BMW	28 (−8)
5	(United States) Ford	26 (−9)

GTD Manufacturers' Championship standings
Pos.	Manufacturer	Points
1	(Germany) Audi	35
2	(Germany) Porsche	32 (−3)
3	(United States) Dodge	30 (−5)
4	(United Kingdom) Aston Martin	28 (−7)
5	(Germany) BMW	26 (−9)

- Note: Only the top five positions are included for all sets of standings.

IMSA SportsCar Championship
Previous race: none	2016 season	Next race: 12 Hours of Sebring
