= 2002 Sharpie 500 =

24th race of the 2002 NASCAR Winston Cup Series

Race details
- Race 24 of 36 in the 2002 NASCAR Winston Cup Series
- The 2002 Sharpie 500 program cover.
- Date: August 24, 2002
- Official name: 42nd Annual Sharpie 500
- Location: Bristol, Tennessee, Bristol Motor Speedway
- Course: Permanent racing facility
- Course length: 0.533 miles (0.858 km)
- Distance: 500 laps, 266.5 mi (428.89 km)
- Scheduled distance: 500 laps, 266.5 mi (428.89 km)
- Average speed: 77.097 miles per hour (124.076 km/h)

Pole position
Driver	Jeff Gordon	Hendrick Motorsports
- Time: 15.470

Most laps led
Driver	Jeff Gordon	Hendrick Motorsports
- Laps: 235

Winner
No. 24	Jeff Gordon	Hendrick Motorsports

Television in the United States
- Network: TNT
- Announcers: Allen Bestwick, Benny Parsons, Wally Dallenbach Jr.

Radio in the United States
- Radio: Performance Racing Network

The 2002 Sharpie 500 was the 24th stock car race of the 2002 NASCAR Winston Cup Series and the 42nd iteration of the event. The race was held on Saturday, August 24, 2002, in Bristol, Tennessee at Bristol Motor Speedway, a 0.533 miles (0.858 km) permanent oval-shaped racetrack. The race took the scheduled 500 laps to complete. At race's end, Jeff Gordon, driving for Hendrick Motorsports, would complete a bump-and-run with less than three to go on eventual second-place finisher, Penske Racing driver Rusty Wallace, to win his 59th career NASCAR Winston Cup Series win and his first of the season. To fill out the podium, Dale Earnhardt Jr. of Dale Earnhardt, Inc. would finish third. But the race became notable for it being a night of tempers were there was 4 different instances where drivers showed their tempers to other drivers.

== Background ==
The layout of Bristol Motor Speedway, the venue where the race was held.

The Bristol Motor Speedway, formerly known as Bristol International Raceway and Bristol Raceway, is a NASCAR short track venue located in Bristol, Tennessee. Constructed in 1960, it held its first NASCAR race on July 30, 1961. Despite its short length, Bristol is among the most popular tracks on the NASCAR schedule because of its distinct features, which include extraordinarily steep banking, an all concrete surface, two pit roads, and stadium-like seating. It has also been named one of the loudest NASCAR tracks.

=== Entry list ===
- (R) denotes rookie driver.

#	Driver	Team	Make
1	Steve Park	Dale Earnhardt, Inc.	Chevrolet
2	Rusty Wallace	Penske Racing	Ford
02	Hermie Sadler	SCORE Motorsports	Chevrolet
4	Mike Skinner	Morgan–McClure Motorsports	Chevrolet
5	Terry Labonte	Hendrick Motorsports	Chevrolet
6	Mark Martin	Roush Racing	Ford
7	Casey Atwood	Ultra-Evernham Motorsports	Dodge
8	Dale Earnhardt Jr.	Dale Earnhardt, Inc.	Chevrolet
9	Bill Elliott	Evernham Motorsports	Dodge
10	Johnny Benson Jr.	MBV Motorsports	Pontiac
11	Brett Bodine	Brett Bodine Racing	Ford
12	Ryan Newman (R)	Penske Racing	Ford
14	Mike Wallace	A. J. Foyt Enterprises	Pontiac
15	Michael Waltrip	Dale Earnhardt, Inc.	Chevrolet
17	Matt Kenseth	Roush Racing	Ford
18	Bobby Labonte	Joe Gibbs Racing	Pontiac
19	Jeremy Mayfield	Evernham Motorsports	Dodge
20	Tony Stewart	Joe Gibbs Racing	Pontiac
21	Elliott Sadler	Wood Brothers Racing	Ford
22	Ward Burton	Bill Davis Racing	Dodge
23	Hut Stricklin	Bill Davis Racing	Dodge
24	Jeff Gordon	Hendrick Motorsports	Chevrolet
25	Joe Nemechek	Hendrick Motorsports	Chevrolet
26	Todd Bodine	Haas-Carter Motorsports	Ford
27	Scott Wimmer	Bill Davis Racing	Dodge
28	Ricky Rudd	Robert Yates Racing	Ford
29	Kevin Harvick	Richard Childress Racing	Chevrolet
30	Jeff Green	Richard Childress Racing	Chevrolet
31	Robby Gordon	Richard Childress Racing	Chevrolet
32	Ricky Craven	PPI Motorsports	Ford
36	Ken Schrader	MB2 Motorsports	Pontiac
40	Sterling Marlin	Chip Ganassi Racing	Dodge
41	Jimmy Spencer	Chip Ganassi Racing	Dodge
43	John Andretti	Petty Enterprises	Dodge
44	Jerry Nadeau	Petty Enterprises	Dodge
45	Kyle Petty	Petty Enterprises	Dodge
48	Jimmie Johnson (R)	Hendrick Motorsports	Chevrolet
49	Derrike Cope	BAM Racing	Dodge
51	Carl Long	Ware Racing Enterprises	Dodge
55	Bobby Hamilton	Andy Petree Racing	Chevrolet
71	Tim Sauter	Marcis Auto Racing	Chevrolet
77	Dave Blaney	Jasper Motorsports	Ford
88	Dale Jarrett	Robert Yates Racing	Ford
89	Morgan Shepherd	Shepherd Racing Ventures	Ford
90	Lance Hooper	Donlavey Racing	Ford
97	Kurt Busch	Roush Racing	Ford
99	Jeff Burton	Roush Racing	Ford
Official entry list

== Practice ==
Originally, three practice sessions were going to be held, with all three being held on Friday, August 23. However, due to a long rain delay during qualifying, the second practice session was canceled.

=== First practice ===
The first practice session was held on Friday, August 23, at 11:20 AM EST, and would last for two hours. Jeff Gordon of Hendrick Motorsports would set the fastest time in the session, with a lap of 15.420 and an average speed of 124.436 mph (200.260 km/h).

Pos.	#	Driver	Team	Make	Time	Speed
1	24	Jeff Gordon	Hendrick Motorsports	Chevrolet	15.420	124.436
2	8	Dale Earnhardt Jr.	Dale Earnhardt, Inc.	Chevrolet	15.507	123.738
3	9	Bill Elliott	Evernham Motorsports	Dodge	15.526	123.586
Full first practice results

=== Final practice ===
The final practice session was held on Friday, August 23, at 6:15 PM EST, and would last for 45 minutes. Ryan Newman of Penske Racing would set the fastest time in the session, with a lap of 15.790 and an average speed of 121.520 mph (195.567 km/h).

Pos.	#	Driver	Team	Make	Time	Speed
1	12	Ryan Newman (R)	Penske Racing	Ford	15.790	121.520
2	9	Bill Elliott	Evernham Motorsports	Dodge	15.889	120.763
3	30	Jeff Green	Richard Childress Racing	Chevrolet	15.985	120.037
Full Final practice results

== Qualifying ==
Qualifying was held on Friday, August 23, at 3:05 PM EST. Each driver would have two laps to set a fastest time; the fastest of the two would count as their official qualifying lap. Positions 1-36 would be decided on time, while positions 37-43 would be based on provisionals. Six spots are awarded by the use of provisionals based on owner's points. The seventh is awarded to a past champion who has not otherwise qualified for the race. If no past champion needs the provisional, the next team in the owner points will be awarded a provisional.

Jeff Gordon of Hendrick Motorsports would win the pole, setting a time of 15.470 and an average speed of 124.034 miles per hour (199.613 km/h).

Four drivers would fail to qualify: Hermie Sadler, Carl Long, Morgan Shepherd, and Tim Sauter.

=== Full qualifying results ===
Pos.	#	Driver	Team	Make	Time	Speed
1	24	Jeff Gordon	Hendrick Motorsports	Chevrolet	15.470	124.034
2	8	Dale Earnhardt Jr.	Dale Earnhardt, Inc.	Chevrolet	15.482	123.938
3	15	Michael Waltrip	Dale Earnhardt, Inc.	Chevrolet	15.486	123.906
4	2	Rusty Wallace	Penske Racing	Ford	15.490	123.873
5	9	Bill Elliott	Evernham Motorsports	Dodge	15.492	123.857
6	10	Johnny Benson Jr.	MBV Motorsports	Pontiac	15.505	123.754
7	32	Ricky Craven	PPI Motorsports	Ford	15.516	123.666
8	97	Kurt Busch	Roush Racing	Ford	15.526	123.586
9	22	Ward Burton	Bill Davis Racing	Dodge	15.528	123.570
10	17	Matt Kenseth	Roush Racing	Ford	15.532	123.538
11	41	Jimmy Spencer	Chip Ganassi Racing	Dodge	15.532	123.538
12	18	Bobby Labonte	Joe Gibbs Racing	Pontiac	15.544	123.443
13	19	Jeremy Mayfield	Evernham Motorsports	Dodge	15.545	123.435
14	12	Ryan Newman (R)	Penske Racing	Ford	15.555	123.356
15	28	Ricky Rudd	Robert Yates Racing	Ford	15.560	123.316
16	4	Mike Skinner	Morgan–McClure Motorsports	Chevrolet	15.565	123.277
17	7	Casey Atwood	Ultra-Evernham Motorsports	Dodge	15.575	123.197
18	30	Jeff Green	Richard Childress Racing	Chevrolet	15.582	123.142
19	88	Dale Jarrett	Robert Yates Racing	Ford	15.587	123.103
20	25	Joe Nemechek	Hendrick Motorsports	Chevrolet	15.618	122.858
21	6	Mark Martin	Roush Racing	Ford	15.621	122.835
22	45	Kyle Petty	Petty Enterprises	Dodge	15.624	122.811
23	29	Kevin Harvick	Richard Childress Racing	Chevrolet	15.639	122.693
24	5	Terry Labonte	Hendrick Motorsports	Chevrolet	15.646	122.638
25	26	Todd Bodine	Haas-Carter Motorsports	Ford	15.647	122.631
26	20	Tony Stewart	Joe Gibbs Racing	Pontiac	15.648	122.623
27	40	Sterling Marlin	Chip Ganassi Racing	Dodge	15.660	122.529
28	11	Brett Bodine	Brett Bodine Racing	Ford	15.662	122.513
29	49	Derrike Cope	BAM Racing	Dodge	15.671	122.443
30	31	Robby Gordon	Richard Childress Racing	Chevrolet	15.672	122.435
31	27	Scott Wimmer	Bill Davis Racing	Dodge	15.679	122.380
32	48	Jimmie Johnson (R)	Hendrick Motorsports	Chevrolet	15.684	122.341
33	14	Mike Wallace	A. J. Foyt Enterprises	Pontiac	15.684	122.341
34	55	Bobby Hamilton	Andy Petree Racing	Chevrolet	15.708	122.154
35	44	Jerry Nadeau	Petty Enterprises	Dodge	15.741	121.898
36	99	Jeff Burton	Roush Racing	Ford	15.769	121.682
Provisionals
37	77	Dave Blaney	Jasper Motorsports	Ford	15.891	120.748
38	21	Elliott Sadler	Wood Brothers Racing	Ford	15.787	121.543
39	43	John Andretti	Petty Enterprises	Dodge	15.848	121.075
40	36	Ken Schrader	MB2 Motorsports	Pontiac	—	—
41	23	Hut Stricklin	Bill Davis Racing	Dodge	15.840	121.136
42	1	Steve Park	Dale Earnhardt, Inc.	Chevrolet	15.791	121.512
43	90	Lance Hooper	Donlavey Racing	Ford	16.072	119.388
Failed to qualify
44	02	Hermie Sadler	SCORE Motorsports	Chevrolet	15.831	121.205
45	51	Carl Long	Ware Racing Enterprises	Dodge	15.942	120.361
46	89	Morgan Shepherd	Shepherd Racing Ventures	Ford	16.098	119.195
47	71	Tim Sauter	Marcis Auto Racing	Chevrolet	16.198	118.459
Official qualifying results

== Race ==
Dale Earnhardt Jr. led the first lap of the race from pole sitter Jeff Gordon. The first caution flew on lap 5 when Todd Bodine, Steve Park, and Lance Hooper crashed on the backstretch. Dale Earnhardt Jr. held on to his lead on the restart of the race on lap 12. On lap 17, the second caution flew when Todd Bodine crashed on the backstretch. The race restarted on lap 23 and Dale Jr. held on to his lead. The third caution flew on lap 30 when Robby Gordon spun in turn 4. The race restarted on lap 36 and no one could catch Dale Earnhardt Jr. as Jr. went on to lead the first 130 laps of the race. After only 21 green flag laps, the fourth caution flew on lap 56 when Ricky Craven spun in turn 2 after he got dumped by Robby Gordon. On pit road during the caution, points leader Sterling Marlin was penalized for dragging his jack out of his pit box and had to go to the rear of the field. The race restarted on lap 62. On lap 68, the 5th caution flew when Elliott Sadler crashed on the backstretch after contact with Joe Nemechek. Sadler got out of his car and pointed at his head at Nemechek as Nemechek went by as if Sadler was saying "I will remember that." The race restarted on lap 76. On lap 131, Jeff Gordon took the lead from Dale Earnhardt Jr. and Gordon would go on to lead the next 116 laps of the race. After 75 green flag laps, The 6th caution flew on lap 150 when rookie star Jimmie Johnson spun in turn 4. Jeff Gordon beat out Jimmy Spencer to win the race off of pit road to keep his lead and the race restarted on lap 157. The 7th caution flew on lap 168 when multiple cars like Scott Wimmer, Terry Labonte, and Derrike Cope cut tires after running over debris. The race restarted on lap 175. On lap 247, Dale Earnhardt Jr. took the lead from Jeff Gordon. But 11 laps later on lap 257, Jeff Gordon took the lead back from Dale Jr. and Gordon would lead the next 116 laps. After the longest green flag run of 117 laps, the 8th caution flew on lap 291 when Steve Park spun in turn 2. Jeff Gordon won the race off of pit road to keep his lead. On the restart on lap 298, chaos ensued that collected a total of 9 cars. Jeremy Mayfield got turned by Dale Jarrett and Mayfield spun up and back down and clipped Jarett causing Jarrett to spin in turn 1 and collect more cars. The wreck also collected Jeff Burton, Ryan Newman, Mark Martin, Jerry Nadeau, Bobby Labonte, Michael Waltrip, and Kurt Busch. The race restarted on lap 308. On lap 315, the 10th caution flew when Ricky Craven slowed on the backstretch and was run into from behind by Jeff Green giving Green major front end damage. The race restarted on lap 331 but on lap 333, the 11th caution flew when Ryan Newman crashed in turn 4 after contact with Mark Martin. Terry Labonte also spun trying to avoid the crash. The race restarted on lap 339.

=== More tempers ===
On lap 347, the 12th caution flew when Hut Stricklin crashed in turn 3 after contact by Jeremy Mayfield. Stricklin, making his final Winston Cup start, got out of his car and pointed and clapped at Mayfield as Mayfield went by as a show of displeasure. The race restarted on lap 356. On lap 370, the 13th caution flew when Casey Atwood and Dave Blaney crashed in turn 2. Ward Burton won the race off of pit road but many cars stayed out including Johnny Benson who was the new race leader. During the caution period, things got a little heated in the lap down lane. Rookie Jimmie Johnson, who was third in points coming into the race, was the first car that was 1 lap down and he lined up alongside the second to last car on the lead lap in Mike Wallace. Behind Johnson was Robby Gordon who was the second car one lap down. During the caution period, Gordon bumped into Johnson's rear bumper a few times for what appears to be because Gordon wanted to restart in front of Johnson. As soon as they took the green flag, Gordon continued to run all over the bumper of Johnson and ended up turning him around collecting Mark Martin as well as John Andretti who spun late bringing out the 14th caution of the race. While they were racing back to the line, Gordon went all over the back bumper of race leader Johnny Benson even shoving him up the race track in an attempt to get his lap back which he did. An angry Johnson got out of his car and waited for Robby Gordon to come by. About 3 laps after the wreck, Johnson went to Gordon's car, gave him the finger, and walked to the ambulance. Johnson in his interview said "just like every form of racing he's ever been it's always somebody else's fault. He had me turned before we even took the green I didn't even have a chance to grab a gear. He's beating my bumper cover off coming to the green because he wanted to restart in front of me. I'm trying to get my lap back as well so he's just crying up a river like he always does. It's a shame we got a chance to win the championship and we get spun out before we take the green on a restart it's just wrong." He also said later that he enjoyed flipping off Gordon. Eventually, NASCAR said that Gordon must come down pit road and serve a 2 lap penalty. But both Gordon and his car owner Richard Childress agreed that Johnson missed a gear shift and that there was nothing that Gordon could do about it. Gordon did eventually serve his penalty. The race restarted on lap 388. On lap 389, Kurt Busch took the lead from Benson. But the tempers did not end. On lap 403, the 15th and final caution flew when Dale Earnhardt Jr. bumped Ward Burton turning Burton around. An angry Burton got out of his car, took off his heel pads on his shoes, and went up to the apron of the race track waiting for Jr. As soon as Burton saw Jr's race car, Burton put his arms out as a gesture to Jr. and threw his brake pads at Jr's car as he went by. Burton's pads ricocheted off of Jr's car and hit Burton. NASCAR did tell Burton and his crew chief Tommy Baldwin Jr. to visit the NASCAR hauler. In his interview, Burton quoted "I wish I had something I could've shot through the window." After the tempers that flared throughout the night, TNT, who was broadcasting the event, decided to have a good sense of humor about the tempers that were shown by different drivers throughout the night. They put up a temper statline on TV that said "Mouthing Off – 2, Finger Pointing – 3, Car Bumping – 5, Heel Pads Thrown – 2, Ambulance Abuse – 1."

=== Final laps ===
The race restarted on lap 424 with Kurt Busch still the leader. On lap 434, Matt Kenseth took the lead from his Roush racing teammate. On lap 444, Kevin Harvick took the lead from Kenseth and held on to it for the next 38 laps. With 22 laps to go, Rusty Wallace passed Matt Kenseth for second and began to close in on Kevin Harvick. With 19 laps to go, Rusty Wallace pulled the bump and run on Harvick and took the lead. With 18 to go, Jeff Gordon passed Harvick for 2nd place. With 10 laps to go, Wallace had built a manageable lead over Gordon and it looked like Wallace was gonna win. But with the laps winding down, Jeff Gordon kept getting closer and closer to Wallace. With 4 laps to go, Wallace got loose coming out of turn 2 and Gordon was now all over the back bumper of Wallace. Gordon attempted to bump and run Wallace a couple different times but Wallace held on to his ground. Finally, with 3 laps to go in turn 3, Gordon got to the back bumper of Wallace and moved him up the race track and Gordon sneaked by Wallace and took the lead. Wallace attempted to get Gordon back in the last 2 laps but could not get to his back bumper and the defending Cup Series champion Jeff Gordon took home his first win of the 2002 season and Wallace finished 2nd. This was Gordon's first win since the 2001 Protection One 400 at Kansas. This was also Gordon's 5th and final career win at Bristol. Dale Earnhardt Jr., Matt Kenseth, and Kevin Harvick rounded out the top 5 while Kurt Busch, Sterling Marlin, Jimmy Spencer, Bobby Labonte, and Mike Wallace rounded out the top 10.

== Race results ==
Fin	St	#	Driver	Team	Make	Laps	Led	Status	Pts	Winnings
1	1	24	Jeff Gordon	Hendrick Motorsports	Chevrolet	500	235	running	185	$245,543
2	4	2	Rusty Wallace	Penske Racing	Ford	500	16	running	175	$173,240
3	2	8	Dale Earnhardt Jr.	Dale Earnhardt, Inc.	Chevrolet	500	140	running	170	$131,090
4	23	29	Kevin Harvick	Richard Childress Racing	Chevrolet	500	38	running	165	$137,033
5	10	17	Matt Kenseth	Roush Racing	Ford	500	10	running	160	$98,375
6	8	97	Kurt Busch	Roush Racing	Ford	500	45	running	155	$83,265
7	27	40	Sterling Marlin	Chip Ganassi Racing	Dodge	500	0	running	146	$113,557
8	11	41	Jimmy Spencer	Chip Ganassi Racing	Dodge	500	0	running	142	$89,840
9	12	18	Bobby Labonte	Joe Gibbs Racing	Pontiac	500	0	running	138	$110,868
10	33	14	Mike Wallace	A. J. Foyt Enterprises	Pontiac	500	0	running	134	$71,690
11	34	55	Bobby Hamilton	Andy Petree Racing	Chevrolet	500	0	running	130	$91,290
12	6	10	Johnny Benson Jr.	MBV Motorsports	Pontiac	500	16	running	132	$92,840
13	36	99	Jeff Burton	Roush Racing	Ford	500	0	running	124	$104,607
14	40	36	Ken Schrader	MB2 Motorsports	Pontiac	499	0	running	121	$88,990
15	22	45	Kyle Petty	Petty Enterprises	Dodge	499	0	running	118	$64,360
16	7	32	Ricky Craven	PPI Motorsports	Ford	499	0	running	115	$71,310
17	5	9	Bill Elliott	Evernham Motorsports	Dodge	499	0	running	112	$88,016
18	17	7	Casey Atwood	Ultra-Evernham Motorsports	Dodge	499	0	running	109	$72,200
19	39	43	John Andretti	Petty Enterprises	Dodge	499	0	running	106	$88,533
20	30	31	Robby Gordon	Richard Childress Racing	Chevrolet	498	0	running	103	$90,366
21	35	44	Jerry Nadeau	Petty Enterprises	Dodge	498	0	running	100	$69,624
22	3	15	Michael Waltrip	Dale Earnhardt, Inc.	Chevrolet	498	0	running	97	$68,935
23	21	6	Mark Martin	Roush Racing	Ford	497	0	running	94	$93,818
24	26	20	Tony Stewart	Joe Gibbs Racing	Pontiac	497	0	running	91	$103,788
25	13	19	Jeremy Mayfield	Evernham Motorsports	Dodge	497	0	running	88	$66,515
26	42	1	Steve Park	Dale Earnhardt, Inc.	Chevrolet	496	0	running	85	$88,015
27	20	25	Joe Nemechek	Hendrick Motorsports	Chevrolet	494	0	running	82	$64,730
28	19	88	Dale Jarrett	Robert Yates Racing	Ford	494	0	running	79	$72,720
29	16	4	Mike Skinner	Morgan–McClure Motorsports	Chevrolet	493	0	running	76	$54,710
30	24	5	Terry Labonte	Hendrick Motorsports	Chevrolet	492	0	running	73	$81,283
31	43	90	Lance Hooper	Donlavey Racing	Ford	488	0	running	70	$51,840
32	28	11	Brett Bodine	Brett Bodine Racing	Ford	473	0	running	67	$51,755
33	37	77	Dave Blaney	Jasper Motorsports	Ford	466	0	running	64	$59,720
34	32	48	Jimmie Johnson (R)	Hendrick Motorsports	Chevrolet	462	0	running	61	$52,685
35	18	30	Jeff Green	Richard Childress Racing	Chevrolet	460	0	running	58	$51,640
36	14	12	Ryan Newman (R)	Penske Racing	Ford	454	0	running	55	$59,605
37	9	22	Ward Burton	Bill Davis Racing	Dodge	401	0	crash	52	$94,545
38	41	23	Hut Stricklin	Bill Davis Racing	Dodge	344	0	crash	49	$51,475
39	15	28	Ricky Rudd	Robert Yates Racing	Ford	271	0	overheating	46	$95,842
40	31	27	Scott Wimmer	Bill Davis Racing	Dodge	164	0	crash	43	$51,350
41	29	49	Derrike Cope	BAM Racing	Dodge	162	0	crash	40	$51,300
42	38	21	Elliott Sadler	Wood Brothers Racing	Ford	74	0	crash	37	$59,255
43	25	26	Todd Bodine	Haas-Carter Motorsports	Ford	21	0	crash	34	$76,634
Official race results

Previous race: 2002 Pepsi 400 presented by Farmer Jack	NASCAR Winston Cup Series; 2002 season	Next race: 2002 Mountain Dew Southern 500
