= Bump and run (auto racing) =

Stock racing manoeuvre

Bump and run is a technique for passing mainly used in stock car and touring car racing, which eventually inspired the police PIT maneuver. While the bump and run maneuver is not uncommon in series such as NASCAR, it is dangerous to use in open-wheel racing in general due to the extremely high speeds and relative fragility of open-wheel race cars.

A trailing car intentionally bumps the rear bumper of the car in front of it. The bump sometimes causes the lead car's rear tires to momentarily lose traction. The driver of the lead car is forced to correct his steering, slow down, or at least stop accelerating to regain traction or car attitude. The trailing driver positions to pass the leading car before the next corner. Bump and run is often done after coming off a corner. It is much more dangerous when done in the middle of a corner because both cars are already loose.

A gentle tap is what is required most of the time. A stronger bump might result in the one or both cars spinning out of control, and possibly leading to a multi-car crash.

== Car of Tomorrow ==
Introduced in 2007, NASCAR's Car of Tomorrow was expected to hinder the effect of bump and run. The rear bumpers on the cars were lowered, while the front bumper was raised. With this configuration, when a trailing car hits a car in the back, the contact is square, and the leading car's rear wheels are not lifted off the track.

== Notable bump-and-run occurrences ==
- 1992 The Winston: Referred to by Charlotte Motor Speedway as "One Hot Night", NASCAR's first race under the lights at a big speedway proved to be a memorable one. Heading into turn three on the final lap, Kyle Petty tapped the rear of Dale Earnhardt's car as the raced for the lead. Earnhardt spun out, and the contact enabled third-place runner Davey Allison to catch Petty. Allison passed Petty as they came out of turn 4 and won the race, but Petty attempted a last second bump-and-run, resulting in Allison losing control of his car and slamming the wall nearly head-on. Allison suffered a concussion, bruised rib, and bruised lung in the crash, resulting in no victory lane celebration.
- 1995 Goody's 500 (Bristol): Dale Earnhardt attempted to use the bump-and-run on Terry Labonte coming out of turn 4 on the final lap of the Bristol Motor Speedway night race, but Labonte was able to stand on the gas and cross the finish line first to win the race. After crossing the line, Labonte slammed the wall hard and ended up driving his destroyed vehicle to victory lane.
- 1997 Food City 500: Trailing Rusty Wallace on the final lap of the spring race at Bristol, Jeff Gordon applied the bump-and-run heading into turn 3, moving Wallace up the race track and enabling Gordon to win the race.
- 1999 Goody's Headache Powder 500: Four years after their first battle, Dale Earnhardt and Terry Labonte once again found themselves racing for the win in the Bristol night race. This time, Earnhardt used the bump-and-run on Labonte entering turn one on the last lap, sending him spinning. This race is most remembered for Earnhardt claiming post-race he wasn't trying to wreck Labonte, but rather "just trying to rattle his cage".
- 2000 Pocono 500: Jeremy Mayfield applied the bump-and-run on Dale Earnhardt on the final lap of the June Pocono race. After the event, Mayfield said he was "just trying to rattle Earnhardt's cage", repeating the quote Earnhardt had used after doing the maneuver on Terry Labonte the previous August in Bristol.
- 2001 Chevrolet Monte Carlo 400: Then-rookie Kevin Harvick used the bump-and-run on Ricky Rudd to get the lead with 18 laps remaining in the fall race at Richmond International Raceway. However, Rudd returned the favor with six laps to go, bumping the rookie in turn 4 and passing him for the victory.
- 2002 Food City 500: With 57 laps remaining in the spring race at Bristol, as Jimmy Spencer passed Kurt Busch for the lead, Busch applied a forceful version of the bump-and-run, slamming Spencer's car and nearly causing him to wreck. Post-race, Busch claimed the move was retaliation for an incident the two had the previous fall at Phoenix. This incident led to a further escalation of a rivalry between the two drivers, one which cumulated with Spencer punching Busch after the 2003 GFS Marketplace 400 at Michigan in August.
- 2002 Sharpie 500: Five years after their first run-in, Jeff Gordon and Rusty Wallace were once again involved in a late-race battle for the win, this time at the fall race under the lights at Bristol. Gordon once again applied the bump-and-run on Wallace, this time with five laps left, to steal the win.
- 2005 Nextel Open: Brian Vickers employed a more frowned-upon version of the bump-and-run in 2005 at Charlotte Motor Speedway. While battling with Mike Bliss for the right to transfer in to the All-Star race, Vickers hooked the right rear quarter panel of Bliss' car, sending Bliss spinning and earning a spot in the All-Star race.
- 2008 Sharpie 500: Carl Edwards utilized the bump-and-run on Kyle Busch with 31 laps to go to take the lead, a lead he would never relinquish. This triggered a post-race confrontation which saw Busch bump Edwards' car after the race. Edwards would return the favor, bumping Busch's car and sending it spinning.
- 2012 Pocono 400: With 3 laps remaining in the Pocono Raceway June event, Joey Logano applied the bump-and-run to Mark Martin to earn his second career victory. Martin was not pleased with the move, saying after the race "had my car been fast enough, I would have given him one back".
- 2014 Quicken Loans Race for Heroes 500: Needing to finish in 11th place or better to advance to the final round of The Chase for the Sprint Cup, Ryan Newman utilized the bump-and-run on rookie Kyle Larson at Phoenix, moving him up the track in the final corner of the final lap to finish 11th in the race and earn the fourth and final berth in the Chase Championship.
- 2016 Toyota Owners 400: Eight years after their Bristol battle, Carl Edwards and Kyle Busch engaged in another short-track showdown, this time as teammates in the Spring race at Richmond. In the final corner of the final lap, Edwards moved Busch up the track with the bump-and-run, earning the win. Unlike their Bristol run-in, there was no confrontation following the race.
- 2017 First Data 500: Twice within the closing laps of the fall short-track playoff race, the bump-and-run was applied. With five laps remaining, Chase Elliott applied the bump-and-run to leader Brad Keselowski, forcing him up the race track. One lap later, Denny Hamlin caught Elliott and utilized the more forceful bump-and-run, causing Elliott to spin. This resulted in a post-race confrontation on pit road which saw Hamlin booed at his home track of Martinsville, Virginia, while the young Elliott was cheered wildly.
- 2018 Foxwoods Resort Casino 301: With 6 laps remaining in the summer classic at New Hampshire Motor Speedway, Kevin Harvick caught a much slower Kyle Busch for the lead. Rather than pass Busch, Harvick chose to apply the bump-and-run, sending the 18 up the track. Harvick would go on to win, claiming "he didn't want to wreck him but didn't want to waste time either".
- 2018 First Data 500: After spending nine consecutive laps side-by-side for the racing lead, Martin Truex Jr. finally cleared Joey Logano heading into turn one on the final lap of the fall Martinsville playoff race. However, heading into turn 3, Logano applied the bump-and-run to Truex, causing the 78 to wash up the track. Logano's car also turned sideways but he was able to save it and hold off a hard-charging Denny Hamlin to secure a place in the Final Four at Homestead.
